= 1919–20 Nemzeti Bajnokság II =

Nemzeti Bajnokság II
- Season: 1919–20
- Champions: Erzsébetfalvi TC (Kárpáti group); VII. Kerületi SC (Stobbe group)
- Promoted: VII. Kerületi SC

The 1919–20 Nemzeti Bajnokság II season was the 20th edition of the Nemzeti Bajnokság II. Teams were placed in two groups named after Ferenc Stobbe and Béla Kárpáti.

== League table ==
=== Kárpáti Group ===
Pos	Team	Pld	W	D	L	GF	GA	GD	Pts	Promotion or relegation
1	Erzsébetfalvi TC	30	22	8	0	66	11	+55	52	Promotion to playoff
2	Budapesti Egyetemi AC (Note: Did not participate in the following championship, but played matched for the Hlavay Béla award with teams of NBI.)	30	23	3	4	99	23	+76	49	
3	Kereskedelmi Alkalmazottak OE	30	19	4	7	69	29	+40	42	
4	Budapest SE	30	15	8	7	45	29	+16	38	
5	Újpesti Munkásképző TE	30	15	8	7	54	46	+8	38	
6	MÁV Gépgyári SK	30	14	4	12	57	55	+2	32	
7	Vérhalmi FC	30	10	10	10	54	41	+13	30	
8	Erzsébetvárosi LAC	30	13	4	13	27	40	−13	30	
9	Józsefvárosi SC	30	10	7	13	31	30	+1	27	
10	Budapesti EVV TSE	30	8	9	13	38	55	−17	25	
11	Előre TE (Note: Started as Előre Torna Egylet, later in autumn used their old name; new name Acél Torna Egylet, in February 1921 merger with Előre Testgyakorlók Köre as Acélgyári Előre SC.)	30	9	8	13	35	56	−21	24 (Note: 2 points deducted?)	
12	Óbudai TE	30	9	3	18	47	43	+4	21	
13	Magyar LK (Magyar FC) (Note: Started as Magyar Football Club but in 1920 merged with Magyar Labdarúgók Köre.)	30	7	6	17	25	75	−50	20	Relegation
14	Budapesti TK	30	6	7	17	22	61	−39	19	
15	Nemzeti TC (Note: Merger with Budapesti Atlétikai Klub in October 1920.)	30	6	4	20	23	66	−43	16	Relegation
16	Ferencvárosi SC	30	5	5	20	24	56	−32	15	Relegation

=== Stobbe Group ===
Pos	Team	Pld	W	D	L	GF	GA	GD	Pts	Promotion or relegation
1	VII. Kerületi SC	32	22	5	5	78	26	+52	49	Promotion to Nemzeti Bajnokság I
2	Testvériség SE	32	21	7	4	78	29	+49	49	
3	Vívó AC	32	18	9	5	66	27	+39	45	
4	Húsiparosok SC	32	17	5	10	59	41	+18	39	
5	Előre TK	32	14	9	9	62	44	+18	37	
6	Újpest-Rákospalotai AK	32	15	7	10	50	42	+8	37	
7	V. kerületi Pannónia SC	32	13	10	9	59	42	+17	36 (Note: Established via the fusion of Nyomdászok Testedző Egylete and Pannónia Sport Kör in 1919.)	
8	Wekerletelepi SC	32	15	6	11	52	46	+6	36	
9	Fővárosi TK	32	13	7	12	52	42	+10	33	
10	Munkás TE	32	13	4	15	47	43	+4	30	
11	Zuglói AC	32	11	8	13	53	53	0	30 (Note: Formerly known as Zuglói Munkás Testedző Egyesület.)	
12	Ékszerészek SC	32	10	7	15	36	47	−11	27	
13	Fővárosi Ifjak AK	32	8	8	16	37	65	−28	24	Relegation
14	Józsefvárosi AC	32	8	5	19	39	67	−28	21	Relegation
15	Erzsébetfalvi MTK	32	8	5	19	39	71	−32	21	
16	Megyeri SC (Note: Merger with Jutagyári Torna Egylet.)	32	5	6	21	32	89	−57	16	Relegation
17	Pénzintézeti Alkalmazottak TO	32	3	6	23	25	88	−63	10 (Note: 2 points deducted)	Relegation

== Promotion play-off (final) ==
VII. kerületi Sport Club - Erzsébetfalvai Torna Club 1:0

== Promotion play-off ==
Pos	Team	Pld	W	D	L	GF	GA	GD	Pts
1	33 FC (Note: 33 FC finished last in the 1919–20 Nemzeti Bajnokság I.)	3	2	1	0	3	0	+3	5
2	Újpesti Törekvés SE (Note: Újpesti Törekvés SE finished in the 13th position in the 1919–20 Nemzeti Bajnokság I.)	3	2	0	1	3	2	+1	4
3	Nemzeti SC (Note: Nemzeti SC finished in the 12th position in the 1919–20 Nemzeti Bajnokság I.)	3	1	0	2	3	4	−1	2
4	Erzsébetfalvi TC	3	0	1	2	0	3	−3	1

== See also ==
- 1919–20 Nemzeti Bajnokság I
