= 1923–24 Nemzeti Bajnokság II =

Nemzeti Bajnokság II
- Season: 1923–24
- Champions: Budapesti EAC
- Promoted: Budapesti EAC; Nemzeti SC
- Relegated: Testvériség SE; Műegyetemi AFC

The 1923–24 Nemzeti Bajnokság II season was the 24th edition of the Nemzeti Bajnokság II.

== League table ==
Pos	Team	Pld	W	D	L	GF	GA	GD	Pts	Promotion or relegation
1	Budapesti Egyetemi AC	26	19	5	2	71	16	+55	43	Promotion to Nemzeti Bajnokság I
2	Nemzeti SC	26	18	4	4	64	27	+37	40	Promotion to Nemzeti Bajnokság I
3	Terézvárosi TC	26	17	5	4	44	17	+27	39	
4	Magyar AC	26	13	7	6	37	24	+13	33	
5	Budapesti AK	26	8	10	8	34	30	+4	26	
6	Ékszerészek SC	26	10	6	10	31	28	+3	26	
7	Kereskedők Atlétikai OE	26	8	8	10	33	33	0	24	
8	Postás SE	26	9	6	11	29	31	−2	24	
9	Fővárosi TK	26	4	16	6	25	29	−4	24	
10	Húsiparosok SC	26	9	3	14	32	43	−11	21	
11	Erzsébeti TC (Note: On 1 January 1924, Erzsébetfalva became a town as Pesterzsébet; therefore, Erzsébetfalvi Torna Club adopted a new name Erzsébeti TC.)	26	4	13	9	20	41	−21	21	
12	Erzsébeti MTK (Note: On 1 January 1924, Erzsébetfalva became a town as Pesterzsébet; therefore, Erzsébetfalvi Torna Club adopted a new name Erzsébeti MTK.)	26	7	5	14	30	43	−13	19	
13	Testvériség SE	26	6	7	13	29	44	−15	19	Relegation
14	Műegyetemi AFC	26	0	5	21	19	92	−73	5	Relegation

== Countryside championships ==
=== Western district ===
Pos	Team	Pld	W	D	L	GF	GA	GD	Pts
1	Szombathelyi AK	18	11	5	2	50	8	+42	27
2	Győri ETO	18	11	3	4	36	28	+8	25
3	Szombathelyi SE	18	9	6	3	36	19	+17	24
4	Tatabányai SC	18	8	5	5	42	22	+20	21
5	DAC-Hungária-Vasutas SE (Note: On 18 August 1923, the Dunántúli Atlétikai Club wa formed by the merger of Hungária Sport Egylet and Győri Vasutas Egylet f)	18	8	5	5	32	17	+15	21
6	MÁV Haladás SE	18	6	6	6	33	23	+10	18
7	Székesfehérvári Duna-Száva-Adria Vasúti Előre TK	18	6	5	7	35	35	0	17
8	Soproni FAC	18	3	2	13	18	56	−38	8
9	Győri AC	18	0	2	16	6	85	−79	2
10	Nagykanizsai TE (Note: The team did not show up for the rematch against ETO, so they were disqualified and had their points forfeited. Next year, they will compete in the Southwest Hungary District.)	0	-	-	-	-	-	—	0

== See also ==
- 1923–24 Magyar Kupa
- 1923–24 Nemzeti Bajnokság I
