= 1921–22 Nemzeti Bajnokság II =

Nemzeti Bajnokság II
- Season: 1921–22
- Champions: Műegyetemi AFC
- Promoted: Műegyetemi AFC; Zuglói AC
- Relegated: Erzsébetfalvi TC; Újpest-Rákospalotai AC; MOVE Óbudai TE; Erzsébetfalvai Törekvés SC; Budapest SE

The 1921–22 Nemzeti Bajnokság II season was the 22nd edition of the Nemzeti Bajnokság II.

== League table ==
Pos	Team	Pld	W	D	L	GF	GA	GD	Pts	Promotion or relegation
1	Műegyetemi AFC	28	16	7	5	46	22	+24	39	Promotion to Nemzeti Bajnokság I
2	Zuglói AC	28	14	10	4	40	18	+22	38	Promotion to Nemzeti Bajnokság I
3	Budapesti AK	28	14	7	7	37	22	+15	35	
4	Nemzeti SC	28	13	7	8	37	33	+4	33	
5	Budapesti Egyetemi AC	28	14	4	10	48	27	+21	32	
6	Kereskedelmi Alkalmazottak OE	28	9	12	7	29	24	+5	30	
7	33 FC	28	12	6	10	37	35	+2	30	
8	Újpesti Törekvés SE	28	13	3	12	39	42	−3	29	
9	Rákosszentmihályi TK	28	10	8	10	36	33	+3	28	
10	Ékszerészek SC	28	11	4	13	32	31	+1	26	
11	Erzsébetfalvi TC	28	10	6	12	42	43	−1	26	Relegation
12	Újpest-Rákospalotai AK	28	8	7	13	35	38	−3	23	Relegation
13	MOVE Óbudai TE	28	6	10	12	39	44	−5	22	Relegation
14	Erzsébetfalvai Törekvés SC	28	7	6	15	31	52	−21	20	Relegation
15	Budapest SE	28	3	3	22	15	79	−64	9	Relegation

== See also ==
- 1921–22 Magyar Kupa
- 1921–22 Nemzeti Bajnokság I
