= 1947–48 Nemzeti Bajnokság II =

Nemzeti Bajnokság II
- Season: 1947–48
- Champions: Tatabánya SC (West); Er-So MADISZ (Central); Kistext SE (East); Goldberger SE (South)
- Promoted: Tatabánya SC (West); Er-So MADISZ (Central); Kistext SE (East); Goldberger SE (South)
- Relegated: Hungária SC (West); Herminamezei AC (Central) Testvériség SE (East) Gyulai TE (South)

The 1947–48 Nemzeti Bajnokság II was the 48th season of the Nemzeti Bajnokság II, the second tier of the Hungarian football league.

== League table ==
=== Western group ===
Pos	Team	Pld	W	D	L	GF	GA	GD	Pts	Promotion or relegation
1	Tatabányai SC	26	16	5	5	75	30	+45	37	Promotion to Nemzeti Bajnokság I
2	Dorogi AC	26	16	3	7	86	53	+33	35	
3	MÁV Dunántúli AC	26	15	3	8	66	36	+30	33	
4	Postás SE	26	15	3	8	65	49	+16	33	
5	Soproni Vasutas SE	26	13	5	8	69	49	+20	31	
6	Pécsi VSK	26	13	3	10	47	45	+2	29	
7	Pápai Perutz SC	26	13	2	11	74	50	+24	28	
8	MESzHART Dinamo	26	12	1	13	62	62	0	25	
9	Pécsi Bőrgyári TC	26	9	7	10	39	58	−19	25	
10	Nagykanizsai Vasutas TE	26	8	6	12	55	58	−3	22	
11	Szombathelyi AK	26	9	3	14	43	72	−29	21	
12	Kaposvári MTE	26	6	8	12	45	52	−7	20	
13	Székesfehérvári MÁV Előre	26	7	3	16	34	72	−38	17	
14	Hungária SC	26	1	6	19	25	99	−74	8	Relegation

=== Central group ===
Pos	Team	Pld	W	D	L	GF	GA	GD	Pts	Promotion or relegation
1	Er-So MaDISz	26	19	4	3	71	22	+49	42	Promotion to Nemzeti Bajnokság I
2	Újpesti MTE	26	16	4	6	63	37	+26	36	
3	Ganz TE	26	16	4	6	51	31	+20	36	
4	Gázgyár	26	16	3	7	64	29	+35	35	
5	Hatvani VSE	26	15	4	7	63	50	+13	34	
6	Magyar Acél SE	26	11	7	8	52	44	+8	29	
7	Budafoki MTE	26	12	4	10	64	47	+17	28	
8	Ceglédi VSE	26	13	2	11	51	53	−2	28	
9	Dunakeszi Magyarság	26	12	3	11	73	65	+8	27	
10	III. ker. TVE	26	8	5	13	57	62	−5	21	
11	Váci SE	26	7	3	16	36	66	−30	17	
12	Ferencvárosi SE	26	7	1	18	39	78	−39	15	
13	MÁV Konzum Vasutas Előre	26	3	6	17	37	73	−36	12	
14	Zugló-Herminamezei AC	26	1	2	23	24	88	−64	4	Relegation

=== Eastern group ===
Pos	Team	Pld	W	D	L	GF	GA	GD	Pts	Promotion or relegation
1	Kistext SE	24	19	0	5	71	27	+44	38	Promotion to Nemzeti Bajnokság I
2	Perecesi TK	24	14	5	5	73	33	+40	33	
3	Wolfner SE	24	13	4	7	41	34	+7	30	
4	Ózdi VTK	24	12	3	9	56	40	+16	27	
5	Miskolci MTE	24	11	4	9	45	37	+8	26	
6	Diósgyőri VTK	24	10	5	9	53	47	+6	25	
7	Miskolci Vasutas SC	24	11	1	12	48	45	+3	23	
8	Salgótarjáni SE	24	9	4	11	43	47	−4	22	
9	Nyíregyházi MaDISz	24	8	3	13	32	38	−6	19	
10	Törekvés SE	24	7	5	12	37	51	−14	19	
11	Nyíregyházi MÁV	24	6	7	11	22	36	−14	19	
12	Mátészalkai TK-VSE	24	8	2	14	43	83	−40	18	
13	Testvériség SE	24	4	5	15	27	73	−46	13	Relegation

=== Southern group ===
Pos	Team	Pld	W	D	L	GF	GA	GD	Pts	Promotion or relegation
1	Goldberger SE	26	17	4	5	74	20	+54	38	Promotion to Nemzeti Bajnokság I
2	Magyar Textil SE	26	14	8	4	59	37	+22	36	
3	Előre SE	26	15	3	8	63	34	+29	33	
4	Drasche	26	14	5	7	53	45	+8	33	
5	Kecskeméti MTE	26	11	6	9	61	55	+6	28	
6	Békéscsabai Előre MTE	26	12	4	10	41	51	−10	28	
7	Tisza VSE (Szeged)	26	10	7	9	48	32	+16	27	
8	Szegedi MTE	26	10	4	12	39	49	−10	24	
9	Kecskeméti AC	26	11	0	15	48	73	−25	22	
10	Makói VSE	26	8	5	13	42	49	−7	21	
11	Orosházi MTK	26	7	6	13	31	42	−11	20	
12	Csongrádi MTK	26	9	2	15	43	60	−17	20	
13	Szolnoki MTE	26	9	2	15	32	48	−16	20	
14	Gyulai TE	26	5	4	17	25	64	−39	14	Relegation

== See also ==
- 1947–48 Nemzeti Bajnokság I
