= 1931–32 Nemzeti Bajnokság II =

Nemzeti Bajnokság II
- Season: 1931–32
- Promoted: Soroksári FC; Szeged FC

The 1931–32 Nemzeti Bajnokság II season was the 32nd edition of the Nemzeti Bajnokság II.

== League table ==
Pos	Team	Pld	W	D	L	GF	GA	GD	Pts	Promotion or relegation
1	Soroksári FC	20	16	4	0	70	25	+45	36	Promotion to Nemzeti Bajnokság I
2	Szeged FC	20	15	5	0	52	13	+39	35	Promotion to Nemzeti Bajnokság I
3	BAK TK	20	13	2	5	33	28	+5	28	
4	Erzsébeti TC FC	20	12	2	6	56	30	+26	26	
5	VAC FC	20	10	3	7	39	31	+8	23	
6	Terézváros FC (Note: On 26 August 1931, Józsefváros FC merged with Terézváros FC, but did not start the following year.)	20	5	0	15	21	65	−44	10	Relegation
7	Turul FC (Note: expelled due to bribery charges, dissolved.)	20	12	3	5	50	23	+27	25 (Note: 2 points deducted)	Relegation
8	Maglód „1930” FC (Note: expelled due to non-payment of dues, dissolved.)	20	5	0	15	18	51	−33	8	Relegation
9	Rákospalotai FC (Note: expelled due to non-payment of dues.)	20	1	1	18	14	62	−48	1	
10	Megyer FC (Note: expelled due to non-payment of dues, dissolved.)	20	3	2	15	9	49	−40	6	Relegation
11	Pécs-Baranya FC (Note: expelled due to non-payment of dues, dissolved.)	20	7	0	13	35	20	+15	12	Relegation

== See also ==
- 1931–32 Magyar Kupa
- 1931–32 Nemzeti Bajnokság I
