= 1948–49 Nemzeti Bajnokság II =

Nemzeti Bajnokság II
- Season: 1948–49
- Champions: Nagykanizsai MAORT (West); Dorogi AC (Central); Debreceni Lokomotív (East); Előre SE (South)
- Promoted: Nagykanizsai MAORT (West); Dorogi AC (Central); Debreceni Lokomotív (East); Előre SE (South)

The 1948–49 Nemzeti Bajnokság II was the 49th season of the Nemzeti Bajnokság II, the second tier of the Hungarian football league.

== League table ==
=== Western group ===
Pos	Team	Pld	W	D	L	GF	GA	GD	Pts	Promotion or relegation
1	Nagykanizsai MAORT MSE	30	20	3	7	79	51	+28	43	Promotion to Nemzeti Bajnokság I
2	Bp. Lokomotív (Note: Formerly known as MÁV Konzum Vasutas Előre.)	30	18	4	8	66	46	+20	40	
3	Pécsi BTC	30	16	7	7	70	42	+28	39	
4	MESZHART Dinamó	30	17	0	13	68	56	+12	34	
5	Kaposvári MTE (Note: On 31 August 1949 merger with Kaposvári Vasutas SE and Kaposvári Rákóczi AC as Kaposvári Dolgozók SK.)	30	12	10	8	61	53	+8	34	
6	Soproni Vasutas SE (Note: New name Soproni Lokomotív.)	30	15	4	11	57	60	−3	34	
7	Postás SE	30	14	5	11	57	41	+16	33	
8	Perutz Pápa SC	30	13	4	13	59	46	+13	30	
9	Pécsi Lokomotív (Note: Formerly known as Pécsi Vasutas SK.)	30	13	3	14	50	56	−6	29	
10	Győri Vasutas SE (Note: Formerly known as MÁV Dunántúli AC.)	30	11	5	14	69	48	+21	27	
11	Elektromos Munkás SE	30	10	7	13	50	58	−8	27	
12	Nagykanizsai Vasutas SE	30	10	6	14	56	69	−13	26	
13	Kőbányai Polgári Sör SE (Note: New name Kőbányai Sörgyári Dolgozók SE.)	30	9	8	13	57	75	−18	26	
14	Székesfehérvári Lokomotív (Note: Formerly known as Székesfehérvári MÁV Előre.)	30	9	5	16	53	79	−26	23	Relegation
15	Szombathelyi AK (Note: Merger with Szombathelyi Bőrgyár and Szombathelyi Textil as Szombathelyi SzMTE.)	30	8	4	18	33	63	−30	20	Relegation
16	Komáromi VSE (Note: Formerly known as MÁV Komáromi AC, new name Komáromi DSK.)	30	6	3	21	48	90	−42	15	Relegation

=== Central group ===
Pos	Team	Pld	W	D	L	GF	GA	GD	Pts	Promotion or relegation
1	Dorogi AC	30	19	9	2	88	28	+60	47	Promotion to Nemzeti Bajnokság I
2	Budafoki MTE	30	21	3	6	99	42	+57	45	
3	Gázgyár	30	18	6	6	72	29	+43	42	
4	Péceli SzIT AC (Note: New name Péceli MÁV AC.)	30	16	4	10	61	53	+8	36	
5	Viscosa SE	30	15	4	11	62	54	+8	34	
6	Újpesti MTE (Note: Merger with Wolfner SE and Újpesti Törekvés SE as Bőripari Dolgozók SE.)	30	13	6	11	72	73	−1	32	
7	Erzsébeti MTK (Note: New name Pesterzsébeti Vasas.)	30	12	6	12	55	56	−1	30	
8	Hatvani VSE	30	11	6	13	55	57	−2	28	
9	Magyar Acél SE	30	11	6	13	52	60	−8	28	
10	Ganz TE	30	10	7	13	53	62	−9	27	
11	Váci DTK (Váci SE) (Note: On 12 August 1948 merger with Váci SE, Váci Remény and Váci AC as Váci Dolgozók Testedző Köre.)	30	10	5	15	51	80	−29	25	
12	III. ker. TVE (Note: New name III. ker. Textilmunkás.)	30	10	4	16	50	63	−13	24	
13	Fások SE (Ferencvárosi SE)	30	8	7	15	47	59	−12	23	
14	Ceglédi VSE	30	8	5	17	37	59	−22	21	Relegation
15	Erzsébeti TC (Note: New name Egyenruházati KTSz, later Egyenruházati NV SE.)	30	7	6	17	45	83	−38	20	Relegation
16	Dunakeszi VSE (Note: Formerly known as Dunakeszi Magyarság.)	30	5	8	17	48	89	−41	18	Relegation

=== Eastern group ===
Pos	Team	Pld	W	D	L	GF	GA	GD	Pts	Promotion or relegation
1	Debreceni Lokomotiv (Debreceni VSE)	30	24	1	5	104	33	+71	49	Promotion to Nemzeti Bajnokság I
2	Ózdi VTK	30	19	6	5	62	39	+23	44	
3	Pereces TK	30	16	7	7	93	48	+45	39	
4	Autótaxi SE (MOGÜRT)	30	16	6	8	62	54	+8	38	
5	Diósgyőri VTK (Note: New name Diósgyőri Vasas.)	30	14	5	11	52	47	+5	33	
6	Wolfner SE (Note: Merger with Újpesti MTE and Újpesti Törekvés SE as Bőripari Dolgozók SE.)	30	14	5	11	57	56	+1	33	
7	Miskolci Lokomotiv (Miskolci VSE)	30	14	4	12	87	70	+17	32	
8	MÁVAG SK	30	11	7	12	49	54	−5	29	
9	Sátoraljaújhelyi TK (Note: Merger with Sátoraljaújhelyi Egyetértés SC as Satoraljaújhelyi TK, new name Sátoraljaújhelyi Magasépítő NVTK.)	30	11	5	14	63	76	−13	27	
10	Mátészalkai DTK (MTK-VSE) (Note: Formerly known as Mátészalkai TKVSE, it split into Mátészalkai DTK and Mátészalkai VSK.)	30	10	7	13	46	61	−15	27	
11	Miskolci MNVTE (Miskolci MTE)	30	11	2	17	63	76	−13	24	
12	Nyíregyházi VSE (Nyíregyházi MÁV) (Note: New name Nyíregyházi Lokomotív.)	30	9	5	16	47	62	−15	23	
13	Salgótarjáni Vasas SE (Salgótarjáni SE)	30	9	5	16	48	73	−25	23	
14	Debreceni SzMTE (Debreceni DSE)	30	9	3	18	59	81	−22	21	
15	Nyíregyházi SzDSE (Nyíregyházi SzIT) (Note: Formerly known as Nyíregyházi MADISz, later from January 1949 Nyíregyházi Dolgozók Szabolcs SE, new name Nyíregyházi Elektromos.)	30	6	8	16	38	69	−31	20	Relegation
16	Törekvés SE	30	6	6	18	44	75	−31	18	Relegation

=== Southern group ===
Pos	Team	Pld	W	D	L	GF	GA	GD	Pts	Promotion or relegation
1	Előre SE	30	23	3	4	100	27	+73	49	Promotion to Nemzeti Bajnokság I
2	Szolnoki Lokomotív (Note: Formerly known as Szolnoki MÁV SE.)	30	20	6	4	71	30	+41	46	
3	MéMOSZ Drasche (Note: Merger with MÉMOSz and Drasche SE.)	30	15	6	9	76	47	+29	36	
4	Kecskeméti MTE (Note: Merger with Kecskeméti AC as Kecskeméti SzTE.)	30	13	6	11	73	49	+24	32	
5	Szolnoki MTE	30	13	6	11	53	40	+13	32	
6	Szegedi MTE (Note: Merger with Szeged AK as Szegedi SzMTE.)	30	14	4	12	76	65	+11	32	
7	Békéscsabai SzSE (Note: Merger with Békéscsabai Előre and Csabai AK.)	30	13	6	11	76	68	+8	32	
8	Phőbus SE	30	14	3	13	58	46	+12	31	
9	Makói VSE (Note: New name Makói Vasas.)	30	13	3	14	50	57	−7	29	
10	Orosházi MTK (Note: New name Orosházi SzMTK.)	30	11	6	13	45	45	0	28	
11	Kecskeméti AC (Note: Merger with Kecskeméti TE as Kecskeméti SzTE.)	30	13	2	15	51	59	−8	28	
12	Magyar Textil SE	30	10	7	13	60	67	−7	27	
13	Újszegedi TC (Note: New name Újszegedi Textil, later Szegedi Textil.)	30	10	7	13	51	58	−7	27	
14	Szegedi Lokomotív (Note: Formerly known as Tisza VSE (Szeged).)	30	9	5	16	48	69	−21	23	
15	Csongrádi MTK (Note: Merger with Csongrádi Tiszáa as Csongrádi SzTK.)	30	5	7	18	41	89	−48	17	Relegation
16	Mezőtúri VSE (Note: Formerly known as Mezőtúri MÁV, later dissolved.)	30	5	1	24	41	154	−113	11	Relegation

=== Promotion playoff ===
==== Semi-finals ====
Debreceni Lokomotív - Nagykanizsai MAORT 5–1 (2–0)

Dorogi AC - Előre SC 2–1 (1–1)

==== Third place ====
Előre - Nagykanizsai MAORT 3–2 (1–0)

==== Final ====
Dorogi AC - Debreceni Lokomotív 6–4 (4–0)

== See also ==
- 1948–49 Nemzeti Bajnokság I
