= Budapest SE =

Hungarian football club

- Full name: Budapest Sport Egyesület
- Founded: 2 December 1913
- Ground: Millneáris
Home colours	Away colours

Budapest Sport Egyesület was a football club from the town of Budapest, Hungary.

== History ==
Budapest SE won the 1920–21 Nemzeti Bajnokság II season.

== Name changes ==
- Budapest Sport Egyesület: 1913 – 1933
- Budapesti Millenáris SE: 1933 – 1933
- Millenáris FC: 1933 – 1936
- In January 1936 merger with Soroksár FC and Zugló VII. ker. FC; however, it turned out in March that the fusion was not successful.
- In 1935 merger with Budapesti TC
- reestablished
- Budapest Sport Egyesület Rókus: ? – 1945
- Házinyomda: 1945 – 1948
- Budapest SE: 1948 – 1951
- Petőfi Városi Tanács SK: 1951 – 1955
- Bástya Városi Tanács SK: 1955 – 1956
- Budapest SE: 1956 – 1957
- Városi Tanács SK: 1957 – 1957
- In 1957 merger with Pesterzsébeti Petőfi SC
- Budapesti Petőfi SK: 1957 – ?
- Városi Tanács SK: ? – 1970
- Budapesti SE: 1970 – ?

== Honours ==
=== League ===
- Nemzeti Bajnokság II:
  - Winners (1): 1920–21

== Seasons ==
The table below shows the seasons of Budapest SE.

Season	Tier	Club's name	Position	Pts
1913–14	4	Budapest SE	13 / 23	22
1915	3	Budapest SE	3 / 9	11
1915	3	Budapest SE	4 / 8	7
1916	2	Budapest SE	2 / 6	5
1916–17	2	Budapest SE	3 / 12	17
1917–18	2	Budapest SE	2 / 12	31
1918–19	2	Budapest SE	4 / 12	24
1919–20	2	Budapest SE	4 / 16	38
1920–21	2	Budapest SE	1 / 14	39
1921–22	2	Budapest SE	15 / 15	9
1922–23	3	Budapest SE	11 / 15	20
1923–24	3	Budapest SE	5 / 15	35
1924–25	3	Budapest SE	4 / 14	33
1925–26	2	Budapest SE	7 / 14	25
1926–27	2	Budapest SE	1 / 16	51
1927–28	2	Budapest SE	2 / 14	40
1928–29	2	Budapest SE	2 / 10	28
1929–30	2	Budapest SE	2 / 14	35
1930–31	2	Budapest SE	4 / 14	38
1931–32	2	Budapest SE	5 / 14	29
1932–33	2	Budapest SE	6 / 15	34
1933–34	2	Millenáris FC	12 / 14	14
1934–35	2	Millenáris FC	8 / 13	22
1935–36	2	Millenáris FC	11 / 14	14
1943–44	5	BSE Rókus	11 / 14	18
1944–45	4	BSE Rókus	0 / 13	
1945	2	Házinyomda	12 / 12	-
1945–46	3	Házinyomda	9 / 14	21
1946–47	4	Házinyomda	3 / 16	35
1947–48	3	Házinyomda	9 / 16	26
1948–49	3	Budapest SE	10 / 18	26
1949–50	3	Budapest SE	7 / 16	33
1950	3	Budapest SE	12 / 16	10
1951	3	Petőfi Városi Tanács	8 / 12	17
1952	3	Petőfi Városi Tanács SK	7 / 14	26
1953	3	Petőfi Városi Tanács	4 / 16	36
1954	3	Petőfi Városi Tanács SK	5 / 16	35
1955	3	Bástya VTSK	1 / 16	48
1956	3	Bp. VTSK	10 / 14	20
1957	3	Városi Tanács SK	4 / 8	13
1957–58	2	Budapesti Petőfi SC	19 / 19	25
1957–58	4	Bp. Petőfi SK	20 / 20	
1958–59	3	Budapesti Petőfi	12 / 16	27
1959–60	3	Budapesti Petőfi	14 / 16	24
1960–61	4	Budapesti Petőfi	10 / 16	27
