= 1956 Nemzeti Bajnokság II =

Nemzeti Bajnokság II
- Season: 1956
- Champions: Komlói Bányász SK (West); Diósgyőri VTK (East)
- Promoted: Komlói Bányász SK (West); Diósgyőri VTK (East)
- Relegated: Gödöllői Dózsa

The 1956 Nemzeti Bajnokság II was the 57th season of the Nemzeti Bajnokság II, the second tier of the Hungarian football league.

== League table ==
=== Western group ===
Pos	Team	Pld	W	D	L	GF	GA	GD	Pts	Promotion
1	Komlói Bányász SK	30	20	7	3	68	25	+43	47	Promotion to Nemzeti Bajnokság I
2	Győri ETO	30	19	5	6	80	28	+52	43	
3	Dunapentelei SC (Sztálinvárosi Vasas)	30	18	7	5	69	25	+44	43	
4	Újpesti Tungsram TE (Vasas Izzó)	30	18	5	7	63	32	+31	41	
5	Budafoki Építők MTE	30	12	9	9	48	45	+3	33	
6	Pénzügyőrök SE	30	14	4	12	49	41	+8	32	
7	Nagykanizsai Zrinyi Olajbánybányász SC	30	9	12	9	31	46	−15	30	
8	Kaposvári Rákóczi AC	30	12	3	15	52	60	−8	27	
9	Váci SE	30	10	7	13	42	55	−13	27	
10	VKSE	30	10	7	13	32	45	−13	27	
11	Szállítók SE	30	10	6	14	47	62	−15	26	
12	Kőbányai Lombik TK	30	8	10	12	42	56	−14	26	
13	Pécsi VSK	30	10	6	14	41	60	−19	26	
14	Zalaegerszegi Dózsa	30	8	8	14	36	46	−10	24	
15	Gázgyár	30	5	3	22	34	72	−38	13	
16	Soproni VSE	30	4	5	21	31	67	−36	13	

=== Eastern group ===
Pos	Team	Pld	W	D	L	GF	GA	GD	Pts	Promotion or relegation
1	Diósgyőri VTK	30	21	4	5	85	24	+61	46	Promotion to Nemzeti Bajnokság I
2	Budapesti VSC	30	18	7	5	56	20	+36	43	
3	Kispesti Textiles	30	17	5	8	65	40	+25	39	
4	Budapesti Spartacus	30	14	11	5	59	42	+17	39	
5	Debreceni VSC	30	16	6	8	45	31	+14	38	
6	Kecskeméti Dózsa	30	14	8	8	46	32	+14	36	
7	Szolnoki MÁV	30	13	8	9	67	52	+15	34	
8	Miskolci VSC	30	12	10	8	37	30	+7	32 (Note: 2 points deducted?)	
9	Salgótarjáni SE	30	9	8	13	33	40	−7	26	
10	Ózdi VTK	30	9	8	13	39	49	−10	26	
11	Perecesi TK	30	11	4	15	35	62	−27	26	
12	Békéscsabai Előre	30	9	3	18	39	53	−14	21	
13	Budapesti Vörös Meteor	30	8	5	17	33	59	−26	21	
14	Gödöllői Dózsa	30	6	8	16	29	55	−26	20	Relegation to Nemzeti Bajnokság III
15	Nagybátonyi Bányász	30	5	6	19	38	67	−29	16	
16	Egri Bástya	30	3	9	18	34	84	−50	15	

== See also ==
- 1955–58 Magyar Kupa
- 1956 Nemzeti Bajnokság I
