= 1915 Nemzeti Bajnokság II =

Nemzeti Bajnokság II
- Season: 1915
- Champions: Vas és Fémmunkások SC

The 1915 Nemzeti Bajnokság II season was the 16th edition of the Nemzeti Bajnokság II.

== League table ==
=== Spring ===
Pos	Team	Pld	W	D	L	GF	GA	GD	Pts
1	Vas- és Fémmunkások SC	11	9	1	1	32	11	+21	19
2	Óbudai TE	11	9	1	1	31	14	+17	19
3	Újpest-Rákospalotai AK	11	9	1	1	34	7	+27	17 (Note: 2 points deducted)
4	Előre TK	11	6	3	2	34	22	+12	15
5	Festőmunkások LE	11	5	4	2	19	22	−3	14
6	Testvériség SE	11	5	1	5	18	17	+1	11
7	Nyomdászok TE	11	4	1	6	16	16	0	9
8	Zuglói SC (Note: In the summer of 1915, it merged with Turul Sport Egyesülettel to form Zuglói Turul Sport Club.)	11	4	1	6	18	25	−7	9
9	Vívó AC	11	3	0	8	16	41	−25	6
10	Nemzeti SC	11	2	1	8	18	28	−10	5
11	Droguista IE	11	1	1	9	14	30	−16	3
12	Budapesti KVT	11	1	1	9	17	38	−21	3

Notes:

No promotion or relegation

=== Autumn ===
Pos	Team	Pld	W	D	L	GF	GA	GD	Pts	Promotion
1	Vas- és Fémmunkások SC	11	11	0	0	46	4	+42	22	Promotion to Nemzeti Bajnokság I
2	Újpest-Rákospalotai AK	11	8	2	1	46	11	+35	18	
3	Festőmunkások LE	11	7	1	3	19	20	−1	15	
4	Nyomdászok TE	11	7	0	4	20	15	+5	14	
5	Előre TK	11	5	2	4	34	14	+20	12	
6	Testvériség SE	11	6	0	5	20	14	+6	12	
7	Budapesti KVT	11	5	0	6	17	26	−9	10	
8	Vívó AC	11	4	1	6	7	25	−18	9	
9	Zuglói Turul SC (Note: Established in the summer of 1915 thanks to the merger of Zuglói Sport Club and Turul Sport Egyesület.)	11	4	0	7	13	19	−6	8	
10	Droguista IE	11	3	0	8	13	38	−25	6	
11	Magyar FC	11	1	1	9	10	34	−24	3	
12	Hofherr és Schrantz SC	11	1	1	9	4	29	−25	3	

== See also ==
- 1915 Magyar Kupa
- 1915 Nemzeti Bajnokság I
