= 1934–35 Nemzeti Bajnokság II =

Nemzeti Bajnokság II
- Season: 1934–35
- Champions: Budafok FC
- Promoted: Budafok FC

The 1934–35 Nemzeti Bajnokság II season was the 35th edition of the Nemzeti Bajnokság II.

== League table ==
Pos	Team	Pld	W	D	L	GF	GA	GD	Pts	Promotion
1	Budafok FC	24	20	4	0	90	22	+68	44	Promotion to Nemzeti Bajnokság I
2	Nemzeti FC	24	17	4	3	75	23	+52	38	
3	Szürketaxi FC	24	15	3	6	63	32	+31	33	
4	Droguisták FC	24	12	6	6	52	53	−1	30	
5	Erzsébeti TC FC	24	12	4	8	48	35	+13	28	
6	Vasas FC	24	11	6	7	48	42	+6	28	
7	Budatétény FC	24	9	5	10	39	96	−57	23	
8	Millenáris FC	24	10	2	12	54	51	+3	22	
9	VAC FC	24	9	4	11	46	45	+1	22	
10	Csepel FC	24	8	1	15	36	46	−10	17	
11	Váci Reménység FC	24	7	1	16	28	78	−50	15	
12	Nagytétény FC	24	3	4	17	20	67	−47	10	
13	Szentlőrinci NFC	24	1	0	23	7	18	−11	2	

== See also ==
- 1934–35 Magyar Kupa
- 1934–35 Nemzeti Bajnokság I
