= 1920–21 Nemzeti Bajnokság I =

Nemzeti Bajnokság I
- Season: 1920–21
- Champions: MTK Budapest FC
- Matches played: 156
- Goals scored: 385 (2.47 per match)

Statistics of Nemzeti Bajnokság I for the 1920–21 season.

== Overview ==
It was contested by 13 teams, and MTK Hungária FC won the championship.

== League standings ==
Pos	Team	Pld	W	D	L	GF	GA	GR	Pts
1	MTK Budapest FC	24	21	2	1	82	9	9.111	44
2	Újpest FC	24	14	8	2	39	14	2.786	36
3	Ferencvárosi TC	24	14	2	8	48	23	2.087	30
4	III. Kerületi TUE	24	8	8	8	25	34	0.735	24
5	Törekvés SE	24	8	7	9	23	36	0.639	23
6	VII. Kerületi SC	24	8	6	10	22	33	0.667	22
7	Kispest AC	24	5	11	8	24	28	0.857	21
8	Budapesti TC	24	7	7	10	22	35	0.629	21
9	Terézvárosi TC	24	6	8	10	21	37	0.568	20
10	Magyar AC	24	7	5	12	25	36	0.694	19
11	Vasas SC	24	5	8	11	20	30	0.667	18
12	Budapesti AK	24	6	6	12	17	34	0.500	18
13	33 FC	24	3	10	11	17	36	0.472	16

Source: rsssf.com

== Results ==
Home \ Away	33F	III	VII	BAK	BTC	FTC	KIS	MAC	MTK	TER	TÖR	ÚJP	VAS
33 FC		0–2	0–0	0–1	0–1	0–4	3–5	0–4	1–5	0–0	2–1	0–2	1–1
III. Kerület	2–0		1–1	1–0	3–1	1–3	1–1	1–0	0–5	2–0	1–1	2–8	1–1
VII. Kerület	0–5	2–0		2–3	0–1	1–0	1–0	2–0	0–2	1–2	2–1	0–2	0–2
Budapesti AK	2–2	1–0	0–3		0–0	1–0	2–1	1–2	0–3	0–2	2–2	0–0	1–1
Budapesti TC	0–1	4–3	1–3	1–0		1–0	2–2	2–1	1–4	1–1	0–1	1–1	1–1
Ferencváros	2–0	3–0	0–1	4–1	2–1		2–1	2–0	1–3	2–0	4–1	0–1	2–2
Kispest	0–0	0–1	2–2	1–0	1–1	1–1		1–0	0–2	0–0	1–1	0–0	2–1
Magyar AC	0–0	0–1	2–1	2–0	1–1	0–5	2–2		2–5	0–3	3–0	2–2	0–1
MTK Budapest	0–0	0–0	8–0	4–0	6–0	1–0	2–0	2–0		4–0	3–1	0–1	5–1
Terézváros	1–1	1–1	0–0	1–2	1–0	3–5	0–1	1–2	0–7		0–0	1–0	1–0
Törekvés	2–0	0–0	0–0	1–0	1–0	0–3	2–1	2–0	0–7	1–1		1–2	2–1
Újpest	1–1	1–1	0–0	1–0	2–0	3–1	1–0	0–0	0–2	5–1	3–0		2–1
Vasas	0–0	1–0	1–0	0–0	0–1	0–2	1–1	1–2	1–2	2–1	0–2	0–1	

Source: rsssf.com
Legend: Blue = home team win; Yellow = draw; Red = away team win.
