= 1933–34 Nemzeti Bajnokság II =

Nemzeti Bajnokság II
- Season: 1933–34
- Champions: Soroksár FC
- Promoted: Soroksár FC

The 1933–34 Nemzeti Bajnokság II season was the 34th edition of the Nemzeti Bajnokság II.

== League table ==
Pos	Team	Pld	W	D	L	GF	GA	GD	Pts	Promotion
1	Soroksári FC	26	25	0	1	116	23	+93	50	Promoted to Nemzeti Bajnokság I
2	Erzsébeti TC FC	26	21	0	5	68	25	+43	42	
3	Szürketaxi FC	26	19	2	5	101	35	+66	40	
4	Budafok FC	26	13	6	7	72	50	+22	32	
5	Vasas FC	26	13	5	8	59	46	+13	31	
6	VAC FC	26	12	3	11	47	53	−6	27	
7	Droguisták FC	26	10	4	12	37	60	−23	24	
8	Szentlőrinci NFC	26	9	5	12	53	62	−9	23	
9	Csepel FC	26	8	6	12	37	63	−26	22	
10	Váci Reménység FC	26	8	4	14	41	70	−29	20	
11	Budatétény FC	26	8	2	16	42	52	−10	18	
12	Millenáris FC	26	4	6	16	39	87	−48	14	
13	Nagytétény FC	26	4	4	18	26	85	−59	12	
14	BAK TK (Note: Withdrew)	26	3	3	20	29	50	−21	9	

== See also ==
- 1933–34 Magyar Kupa
- 1933–34 Nemzeti Bajnokság I
