= 1925–26 Nemzeti Bajnokság I =

Nemzeti Bajnokság I
- Season: 1925–26
- Champions: Ferencvárosi TC
- Relegated: Budapesti EAC; Vívó és Atlétikai Club; Erzsébeti TC; Törekvés SE
- Matches played: 110
- Goals scored: 470 (4.27 per match)

Statistics of Nemzeti Bajnokság I for the 1925–26 season.

== Overview ==
It was contested by 10 teams, and Ferencvárosi TC won the championship.

== League standings ==
Pos	Team	Pld	W	D	L	GF	GA	GR	Pts
1	Ferencvárosi TC	22	14	5	3	58	24	2.417	33
2	MTK Budapest FC	22	12	7	3	52	18	2.889	31
3	Vasas SC	22	11	7	4	58	47	1.234	29
4	Újpest FC	22	11	5	6	48	29	1.655	27
5	Nemzeti SC	22	6	12	4	27	27	1.000	24
6	Kispest AC	22	8	5	9	47	51	0.922	21
7	III. Kerületi TUE	22	9	3	10	46	56	0.821	21
8	33 FC	22	5	8	9	25	33	0.758	18
9	Budapesti EAC	22	5	7	10	31	39	0.795	17
10	Vívó és Atlétikai Club	22	3	11	8	24	45	0.533	17
11	Erzsébeti TC	22	4	7	11	23	44	0.523	15
12	Törekvés SE	22	3	5	14	31	57	0.544	11

Source: rsssf.com

== Results ==
Home \ Away	33F	KER	BEAC	ERZ	FTC	KIS	MTK	NEM	TÖR	ÚJP	VAS	VIV
33 FC		1–2	1–1	2–0	0–0	0–2	1–1	1–5	2–0	1–2	3–3	2–0
III. Kerület	3–2		2–1	4–3	5–5	2–3	1–2	5–0	2–1	0–7	1–2	2–1
Budapesti EAC	2–1	1–0		0–0	-:+ (Note: The match between Budapesti EAC and Ferencváros was settled as a goalless win for Ferencváros.)	1–1	0–1	4–0	2–1	2–3	1–3	2–2
Erzsébet	3–1	2–2	1–4		1–3	2–2	2–5	0–0	0–1	1–0	1–1	1–0
Ferencváros	2–0	7–2	2–2	1–0		3–1	0–1	0–0	5–1	2–0	3–1	8–0
Kispest	2–3	2–3	4–2	4–0	1–4		0–6	0–0	2–0	2–0	0–3	2–0
MTK Budapest	0–0	7–2	7–1	0–1	1–1	5–1		0–1	2–0	2–1	0–2	6–0
Nemzeti	0–0	0–0	1–0	2–0	2–3	6–3	1–1		2–2	2–2	1–4	1–1
Törekvés	2–2	0–2	2–2	5–1	0–3	2–7	1–3	0–0		1–4	5–7	2–1
Újpest	1–2	2–1	2–1	3–0	3–1	2–2	1–1	0–0	2–1		2–2	5–2
Vasas	2–0	5–4	4–1	3–3	1–4	5–4	1–1	0–2	4–2	1–5		2–2
Vivó	0–0	2–1	1–1	1–1	2–1	2–2	0–0	1–1	2–2	2–1	2–2	

Source: rsssf.com
Legend: Blue = home team win; Yellow = draw; Red = away team win.
