= Nemzeti Bajnokság II =

Hungarian second-tier association football league

- Organising body: Magyar Labdarúgó Szövetség
- Founded: 1901; 125 years ago
- Country: Hungary
- Confederation: UEFA
- Number of clubs: 16
- Level on pyramid: 2
- Promotion to: Nemzeti Bajnokság I
- Relegation to: Nemzeti Bajnokság III
- Domestic cup: Hungarian Cup
- Current champions: Vasas (5th title) (2025–26)
- Most championships: Szombathelyi Haladás (10 titles)
- Broadcaster: M4 Sport
- Website: mlsz.hu
- Current: 2026–27 Nemzeti Bajnokság II

The Nemzeti Bajnokság II also known as NB II or Merkantil Bank Liga after its title sponsor, OTP Bank's subsidiary, is a professional association football league in Hungary and the second division level of the Hungarian football league system. Since the 2026–27 season, the champion is promoted directly, while the second-placed team has the opportunity to be promoted to the first division in a play-off against the eleventh-placed team from the Nemzeti Bajnokság I, while the two lowest teams in second league are relegated to Nemzeti Bajnokság III.

From the 2024–25 season, only 16 teams will participate in the league.

== History ==
Nemzeti Bajnokság II was founded in 1901, having 8 teams. The first champions were 33FC having won the 1901 Nemzeti Bajnokság II season. The first two teams would participate in a promotion playoff with the last 2 teams from the first league (1901 Nemzeti Bajnokság I). The early decades were characterized by a strong Budapest-centric model; the core of the league consisted of clubs from the capital, while regional football developed independently within separate district championships. A major turning point came in 1926 with the introduction of professionalism and the establishment of the nationwide Professional II Division. This step not only bridged the gap between capital and regional clubs but also sustained the competitiveness of the league through the challenges of the Great Depression and World War II, during which the league's geographical reach temporarily expanded from Upper Hungary to Transylvania due to border shifts also competed in the league such as Ungvári AC and Nagyvárad AC.

The post-WWII nationalization and socialist sports management fundamentally reshaped the landscape. Clubs were reorganized around factories, trade unions, or armed forces, sparking the rise of industrial towns in the countryside. During this era, the structure of the NB II (or occasionally NB B) constantly fluctuated between a single nationwide group and multiple regional groups. This period marked the true golden age of the second division in terms of match attendance. In traditional football bastions like Fehérvár, Szeged, Diósgyőr, Szombathely and Pécs, crowds of tens of thousands regularly gathered to support their teams. Stability was finally achieved in 1978 with the introduction of a unified, 20-team national championship, which guaranteed a high standard of sporting competition.

The economic shock of the regime change in 1989 did not spare football. With the collapse of factory sponsorships, dozens of clubs went bankrupt or merged. The 1990s and 2000s were defined by organizational instability; the name of the championship (NB I/B, NB II) and its format changed frequently, and between 2005 and 2013, the league was split into Eastern and Western groups. While this solution reduced travel costs for clubs, it diluted the quality of the competition and led to frequent licensing issues and mid-season bankruptcies.

The modern era was established by a radical reform initiated by the MLSZ in 2013, which returned the competition to a single, nationwide group. To boost competitiveness and economic stability, the federation gradually streamlined the league, reducing the number of teams to the current 16-club format. Today's NB II is characterized by strict professional infrastructure requirements—including mandatory stadium floodlights and modern pitches—as well as regulations that financially incentivize clubs to field young Hungarian talent. As a result, the second division now offers a competitive environment where historic clubs fight to return to the top flight clash with ambitious, rising teams, all while serving as the most vital talent pipeline for the future of Hungarian football.

== Current clubs ==
Location of teams in 2026–27 Nemzeti Bajnokság II
Location of the teams in Budapest.

Team	Location	Stadium	Capacity
Aqvital FC Csákvár	Csákvár	Tersztyánszky Ödön Sportközpont	2,020
BVSC-Zugló	Budapest (Zugló)	Szőnyi úti Stadion	12,000
Diósgyőri VTK	Miskolc	DVTK Stadion	15,325
FC Ajka	Ajka	Városi Szabadidő- és Sportcentrum	5,000
Gyirmót FC Győr	Győr (Gyirmót)	Ménfői úti Stadion	4,500
HR-Rent Kozármisleny	Kozármisleny	Kozármislenyi Stadion	2,000
Karcagi SE	Karcag	Liget úti Sporttelep	2,500
Kecskeméti TE	Kecskemét	Széktói Stadion	6,300
Kolorcity Kazincbarcikai SC	Kazincbarcika	Kolorcity Aréna	1,080
Mezőkövesd Zsóry FC	Mezőkövesd	Mezőkövesdi Városi Stadion	4,183
Nagykanizsa FC	Nagykanizsa	Olajbányász Sporttelep	7,000
Soroksár SC	Budapest (Soroksár)	Szamosi Mihály Sporttelep	5,000
Szeged-Csanád Grosics Akadémia	Szeged	Szent Gellért Fórum	8,136
Szentlőrinc SE	Szentlőrinc	Szentlőrinc SE Sporttelep	1,020
Tiszakécskei LC	Tiszakécske	Tiszakécske Városi Sportcentrum	4,500
Videoton FC Fehérvár	Székesfehérvár	Sóstói Stadion	14,201

== Format ==
On 2 March 2017, the Hungarian Football Federation announced that the number of the teams in the Nemzeti Bajnokság II will not be reduced to 12.

From 2024 onwards, the league was reduced to 16 teams from 20 and 18 teams in 2022–2024, respectively.

Number of groups	Seasons
1	between 1901 and 1913–14, in 1915, between 1916–17 and 1918–19, between 1921–22 and 1937–38, between 1963 and 1969, between 1970–71 and 1977–78, between 1982–83 and 1987–88, between 1997–98 and 1999–00, between 2002–03 and 2004–05, between 2013–14 and present
2	between 1919–20 and 1920–21, between 1937–38 and 1938–39, between 1955 and 1956, between 1958–59 and 1962–63, in 1970, between 1988–89 and 1996–97, between 2000–01 and 2001–02, between 2005–06 and 2012–13
3	in 1914, in 1939–40, In 1941–42, in 1957–58, between 1978–79 and 1981–82
4	in 1943–44, between 1946–47 and 1954, in 1957
5	in 1940–41, in 1942–43
9	in 1945
16	in 1944–45

== List of champions ==
- 1901: 33 FC
- 1902: Postás
- 1903: Főváros
- 1904: Újpest
- 1905: BAK
- 1906: Tisztviselők
- 1906–07: Törekvés
- 1907–08: 33 FC
- 1908–09: Nemzeti
- 1909–10: 33 FC
- 1910–11: III. Kerület
- 1911–12: Újpest
- 1912–13: III. Kerület
- 1913–14: MAFC
- 1914: Főváros, Újpest-Rákospalotai AK
- 1915: Vasas
- 1916–17: MÁV Gépgyári SK
- 1917–18: Terézváros
- 1918–19: Testvériség
- 1919–20: Erzsébetfalva, VII. Kerület
- 1920–21: BSE, VAC
- 1921–22: MAFC
- 1922–23: Újpesti Törekvés
- 1923–24: BEAC
- 1924–25: 33 FC
- 1925–26: Főváros
- 1926–27: Miskolci AK
- 1927–28: Somogy
- 1928–29: Pécs-Baranya
- 1929–30: Sabaria
- 1930–31: Somogy
- 1931–32: Soroksár
- 1932–33: Phöbus
- 1933–34: Soroksár
- 1934–35: Budafok FC
- 1935–36: Nemzeti
- 1936–37: Szürketaxi
- 1937–38: Zuglói SE, Szolnok
- 1938–39: Szombathely, Törekvés
- 1939–40: Tokod, Csepel, Salgótarján
- 1940–41: Szegedi VSE, Lampart, Nagyvárad, Marosvásárhely, Sepsiszentgyörgyi Textil
- 1941–42: Szombathely, Vasas, Törekvés
- 1942–43: Győr, Szegedi VSE, BSzKRT, BVSC, Debrecen
- 1943–44: MÁVAG SK, Ungvár, Szentlőrinc, Szegedi AK
- 1944–45: suspended due to World War II
- 1945: Békéscsaba, Elektromos, Soproni VSE, Dorog, Diósgyőr, PVSK, Kecskemét, Szeged AK
- 1946–47: MOGÜRT SC, Erzsébeti MTK, MATEOSz, Elektromos
- 1947–48: Tatabánya, Soroksár, Kistext, Goldberger
- 1948–49: Nagykanizsa, Dorog, Debrecen, BKV Előre
- 1949–50: Tatabánya, Bőripari, Diósgyőr, Szegedi AK
- 1950: Tatabányai Építők SK, Soroksár, Sajószentpéteri Tárna, Szegedi Honvéd SE
- 1951: PVSK, Budafok, Postás, Keltex
- 1952: Vörös Lobogó Sor Tex, Sztálin Vasmű Építők, Miskolci Honvéd SE, Vasas Izzó
- 1953: PVSK, Szikra Gázművek, Diósgyőr, Vasas Izzó
- 1954: Kőbányai Dózsa, Budapesti Vörös Meteor, Ózd, Szolnoki Légierő
- 1955: Tatabánya, Szegedi Haladás
- 1956: Komló, Diósgyőr
- 1957: Videoton, Nyíregyháza, Szegedi VSE, Oroszlány
- 1957–58: Győr, BVSC, Miskolc
- 1958–59: Pécs, Szegedi EAC
- 1959–60: Győr, Debrecen
- 1960–61: Komló, Ózd
- 1961–62: Szombathely, Debrecen
- 1962–63: Csepel, Diósgyőr
- 1963: VM Egyetértés
- 1964: Salgótarján
- 1965: Dunaújváros
- 1966: Szegedi EAC
- 1967: Egyetértés
- 1968: Eger
- 1969: Videoton
- 1970: Pécsi Bányász SC
- 1970: FŐSPED Szállítók SE
- 1970–71: Vörös Meteor
- 1971–72: Szegedi EOL
- 1972–73: Szombathely
- 1973–74: Diósgyőr
- 1974–75: Szegedi EOL
- 1975–76: Dunaújváros
- 1976–77: Pécsi MFC
- 1977–78: Salgótarján
- 1978–79: PVSK, Volán, Debrecen
- 1979–80: Kaposvár, Csepel, Nyíregyháza
- 1980–81: Szombathely, Szegedi EOL, Ózd
- 1981–82: Nagykanizsa, MTK, Kazincbarcika
- 1982–83: Volán
- 1983–84: Eger
- 1984–85: Volán
- 1985–86: Dunaújváros
- 1986–87: Kaposvár
- 1987–88: Veszprém
- 1988–89: Csepel
- 1988–89: Debrecen
- 1989–90: Volán, Szeged SC
- 1990–91: Szombathely, BVSC
- 1991–92: Csepel, Békéscsaba
- 1992–93: Szombathely, Debrecen
- 1993–94: Nagykanizsa, Stadler
- 1994–95: Szombathely, MTK
- 1995–96: Siófoki Bányász FC, III. Kerület
- 1996–97: Gázszer, Tiszakécske
- 1997–98: Nyíregyháza
- 1998–09: Tatabánya
- 1999–00: Videoton
- 2000–01: Szombathely, BKV Előre
- 2001–02: Siófok, Békéscsaba
- 2002–03: Pécsi MFC
- 2003–04: Budapest Honvéd
- 2004–05: Tatabánya
- 2005–06: Paks, Vác
- 2006–07: Siófok, Nyíregyháza
- 2007–08: Szombathely, Kecskemét
- 2008–09: Gyirmót, Ferencváros
- 2009–10: Siófok, Szolnok
- 2010–11: Pécs, Diósgyőr
- 2011–12: MTK, Eger
- 2012–13: Puskás Akadémia, Mezőkövesd
- 2013–14: Nyíregyháza
- 2014–15: Vasas
- 2015–16: Gyirmót
- 2016–17: Puskás Akadémia
- 2017–18: MTK
- 2018–19: Zalaegerszeg
- 2019–20: MTK
- 2020–21: Debrecen
- 2021–22: Vasas
- 2022–23: Diósgyőr
- 2023–24: Nyíregyháza
- 2024–25: Kisvárda
- 2025–26: Vasas

=== Note ===
1. winning the Nemzeti Bajnokság II did not mean automatic promotion to Nemzeti Bajnokság I.
2. Between 1963 and 1973–74, the name of the second division was Nemzeti Bajnokság I/B.

== Statistics ==
=== Most titles ===
Below is a ranking of the clubs by most titles won.

Club	Titles	Winning seasons
Szombathelyi Haladás	10	1938–39, 1941–42, 1944–45, 1961–62, 1972–73, 1980–81, 1990–91, 1992–93, 1994–95, 2007–08
Debrecen	8	1942–43 1948–49, 1959–60, 1961–62, 1978–79, 1988–89, 1992–93, 2020–21
Diósgyőr	8	1945, 1949–50, 1953, 1956, 1962–63, 1973–74, 2010–11, 2022–23
Szegedi EAC	6	1958–59, 1966, 1971–72, 1974–75, 1980–81, 1989–90
Csepel	5	1939–40, 1962–63, 1979–80, 1988–89, 1991–92
MTK	5	1981–82, 1994–95, 2011–12, 2017–18, 2019–20
Nyíregyháza	5	1979–80, 1997–98, 2006–07, 2013–14, 2023–24
Vasas	5	1915, 1941–42, 2014–15, 2021–22, 2025–26
33 FC	4	1901, 1907–08, 1909–10, 1924–25
Dunaújváros	4	1952 (as Sztálin Vasmű Építők), 1965, 1975–76, 1985–86
Pécsi MFC	4	1958–59, 1976–77, 2002–03, 2010–11
Pécsi Vasutas	4	1945, 1951, 1953, 1978–79
Siófok	4	1995–96, 2001–02, 2006–07, 2009–10
Soroksár	4	1931–32, 1933–34, 1947–48, 1950
Tatabánya	4	1947–48, 1949–50, 1955, 2004–05
VM Egyetértés	4	1954, 1963, 1967, 1970–71
Volán	4	1978–79, 1982–83, 1984–85, 1989–90
Békéscsaba	3	1945, 1991–92, 2001–02
BKV Előre	3	1942–43, 1948–49, 2000–01
BVSC	3	1942–43, 1957–58, 1990–91
Eger	3	1968, 1983–84, 2011–12
Győr	3	1942–43, 1957–58, 1959–60
Ózd	3	1954, 1960–61, 1980–81
Nagykanizsa	3	1948–49, 1981–82, 1993–94
Salgótarján	3	1939–40, 1964, 1977–78
Szegedi AK	3	1943–44, 1945, 1949–50
Szegedi VSE	3	1940–41, 1942–43, 1957
Törekvés	3	1906–07, 1938–39, 1941–42
Videoton	3	1957, 1969, 1999–2000
Budapesti Postás	2	1902, 1951
Budapesti Vörös Meteor	2	1954, 1967
Dorog	2	1945, 1948–49
Elektromos	2	1945, 1946–47
Kaposvár	2	1979–80, 1986–87
Kecskemét	2	1945, 2007–08
Komló	2	1956, 1960–61
MAFC	2	1913–14, 1921–22
Nemzeti	2	1908–09, 1935–36
Puskás Akadémia	2	2012–13, 2016–17
Somogy	2	1927–28, 1930–31
Szolnok	2	1937–38, 2009–10
Terézváros	2	1903, 1917–18
Újpest	2	1904, 1911–12
Vasas Izzó	2	1952, 1953
Vörös Lobogó Keltex	2	1947–48, 1951
BAK	1	1905
BEAC	1	1923–24
Bőripari Dolgozók	1	1949–50
Budafok FC	1	1934–35
Budapest Honvéd	1	2003–04
BSE	1	1920–21
Erzsébetfalva	1	1919–20
ESMTK	1	1946–47
Ferencváros	1	2008–09
FŐSPED	1	1970
Gázművek	1	1953
Kazincbarcika	1	1981–82
Kiskőrös	1	1993–94
Kisvárda	1	2024–25
Kőbányai Dózsa	1	1954
Mezőkövesd	1	2012–13
Miskolci AK	1	1926–27
Miskolci VSC	1	1957–58
Nagykanizsai MAORT	1	1948–49
Nagyvárad	1	1940–41
Nyíregyházi Építők	1	1957
Oroszlány	1	1957
Paks	1	2005–06
Pécs-Baranya	1	1928–29
Pécsi Bányász	1	1970
Phöbus	1	1932–33
Sabaria	1	1929–30
Sajószentpéteri Tárna	1	1950
Sepsiszentgyörgyi Textil	1	1940–41
Soproni VSE	1	1945
Szentlőrinc	1	1943–44
Szürketaxi	1	1936–37
Testvériség	1	1918–19
Tiszakécske	1	1996–97
Tisztviselők	1	1906
Tokod	1	1939–40
Újpest-Rákospalota	1	1914
Újpesti Törekvés	1	1922–23
Ungvár	1	1943–44
VAC	1	1920–21
Vác FC	1	2005–06
Veszprém	1	1987–88
VII. Kerület	1	1919–20
Zalaegerszeg	1	2018–19
Zuglói SE	1	1937–38

=== Name changes ===
- BKV Előre – BSzKRT, Előre SC
- Budafoki MTE – Budapesti Gyárépítők (in 1951)
- Budafok FC – Gamma FC (Please note that Budafok FC and Budafok MTE are two distinct teams)
- Budapesti Vörös Meteor – Egyetértés
- Csepel – Weisz-Manfréd FC (in 1939–40), Csepel SC (in 1962–63, 1979–80, 1988–89, 1991–92),
- Diósgyőr – Diósgyőri Vasas TK (in 1945), Diósgyőri Vasas (in 1949–50, 1953), Diósgyőri VTK (in 1956, 1962–63, 1973–74, 2010–11, 2022–23)
- Soroksár – Soroksári Textil, Er-So MaDISz
- Szeged EAC – Szegedi EOL
- Szombathely – Szombathelyi Haladás VSE (in 1938–39, 1941–42), Haladás (in 1944–45), Szombathelyi Haladás (in 1961–62), Haladás VSE (in 1972–73), Haladás Vasutas SE (in 1980–81), Haladás VSE (in 1990–91, 1992–93, 1994–95), Haladás (in 2007–08)
- Terézváros – Fővárosi TC
- Vasas Izzó – Tunsgram SC
- Vörös Lobógó Keltex – Kelenföldi Textilgyár

== Sponsorship ==
The title sponsor of the championship is Merkantil Bank, the OTP Bank's subsidiary.

== Media coverage ==
The M4 Sport will broadcast 1–1 matches and big matches.

== See also ==
- Nemzeti Bajnokság I
- Nemzeti Bajnokság III
- Magyar Kupa
- Szuperkupa
