= 1955 Nemzeti Bajnokság II =

Nemzeti Bajnokság II
- Season: 1955
- Champions: Tatabányai Bányász (West); Szegedi Haladás (East)
- Promoted: Tatabányai Bányász (West); Szegedi Haladás (East)
- Relegated: Kinizsi Dohánygyár (West); Várpalotai Bányász SK (West); Győri Törekvés (West); Nyíregyházi Építők (East); Kecskeméti Honvéd (East); Ceglédi Törekvés (East)

The 1955 Nemzeti Bajnokság II was the 56th season of the Nemzeti Bajnokság II, the second tier of the Hungarian football league.

== League table ==
=== Western group ===
| Pos | Team | Pld | W | D | L | GF | GA | GD | Pts | Promotion or relegation |
|---|---|---|---|---|---|---|---|---|---|---|
| 1 | Tatabányai Bányász | 30 | 21 | 5 | 4 | 85 | 22 | +63 | 47 | Promotion to Nemzeti Bajnokság I |
| 2 | Budapesti Spartacus | 30 | 18 | 5 | 7 | 64 | 40 | +24 | 41 | |
| 3 | Sztálinvárosi Vasas | 30 | 15 | 7 | 8 | 78 | 37 | +41 | 37 | |
| 4 | Komlói Bányász | 30 | 14 | 7 | 9 | 58 | 36 | +22 | 35 | |
| 5 | Pénzügyőrök | 30 | 10 | 10 | 10 | 41 | 42 | −1 | 30 | |
| 6 | Budapesti Gyárépítők | 30 | 13 | 4 | 13 | 36 | 43 | −7 | 30 | |
| 7 | Pécsi Törekvés | 30 | 11 | 7 | 12 | 46 | 61 | −15 | 29 | |
| 8 | Vasas Dinamó | 30 | 10 | 7 | 13 | 41 | 46 | −5 | 27 | |
| 9 | Váci Bástya | 30 | 11 | 5 | 14 | 44 | 55 | −11 | 27 | |
| 10 | Nagykanizsai Bányász | 30 | 10 | 7 | 13 | 51 | 64 | −13 | 27 | |
| 11 | Soproni Törekvés | 30 | 10 | 7 | 13 | 54 | 69 | −15 | 27 | |
| 12 | Kaposvári Kinizsi | 30 | 10 | 7 | 13 | 52 | 70 | −18 | 27 | |
| 13 | Törekvés Szállítók SE | 30 | 9 | 9 | 12 | 41 | 59 | −18 | 27 | |
| 14 | Kinizsi Dohánygyár | 30 | 11 | 4 | 15 | 44 | 47 | −3 | 26 | Relegation to Nemzeti Bajnokság III |
| 15 | Várpalotai Bányász SK | 30 | 6 | 10 | 14 | 33 | 58 | −25 | 22 | Relegation to Nemzeti Bajnokság III |
| 16 | Győri Törekvés | 30 | 8 | 5 | 17 | 34 | 53 | −19 | 21 | Relegation to Nemzeti Bajnokság III |

=== Eastern group ===
| Pos | Team | Pld | W | D | L | GF | GA | GD | Pts | Promotion or relegation |
|---|---|---|---|---|---|---|---|---|---|---|
| 1 | Szegedi Haladás | 30 | 18 | 8 | 4 | 72 | 28 | +44 | 44 | Promotion to Nemzeti Bajnokság I |
| 2 | Budapesti Törekvés | 30 | 18 | 5 | 7 | 67 | 33 | +34 | 41 | |
| 3 | Budapesti Vörös Meteor | 30 | 17 | 3 | 10 | 62 | 40 | +22 | 37 | |
| 4 | Gödöllői Dózsa | 30 | 15 | 5 | 10 | 53 | 35 | +18 | 35 | |
| 5 | Kecskeméti Dózsa | 30 | 14 | 7 | 9 | 55 | 42 | +13 | 35 | |
| 6 | Vörös Lobogó KISTEXT | 30 | 12 | 8 | 10 | 44 | 42 | +2 | 32 | |
| 7 | Salgótarjáni Vasas | 30 | 11 | 7 | 12 | 44 | 51 | −7 | 29 | |
| 8 | Békéscsabai Építők | 30 | 12 | 4 | 14 | 35 | 45 | −10 | 28 | |
| 9 | Miskolci Törekvés | 30 | 10 | 8 | 12 | 42 | 57 | −15 | 28 | |
| 10 | Debreceni Törekvés | 30 | 8 | 11 | 11 | 38 | 35 | +3 | 27 | |
| 11 | Budapesti Szikra | 30 | 10 | 7 | 13 | 28 | 36 | −8 | 27 | |
| 12 | Perecesi Bányász | 30 | 9 | 9 | 12 | 35 | 56 | −21 | 27 | |
| 13 | Ózdi Vasas | 30 | 8 | 9 | 13 | 30 | 44 | −14 | 25 | |
| 14 | Nyíregyházi Építők | 30 | 9 | 6 | 15 | 33 | 47 | −14 | 24 | Relegation to Nemzeti Bajnokság III |
| 15 | Kecskeméti Honvéd | 30 | 6 | 9 | 15 | 26 | 54 | −28 | 21 | Relegation to Nemzeti Bajnokság III |
| 16 | Ceglédi Törekvés | 30 | 6 | 6 | 18 | 36 | 55 | −19 | 18 | Relegation to Nemzeti Bajnokság III |

== See also ==
- 1955–58 Magyar Kupa
- 1955 Nemzeti Bajnokság I
