= 1918–19 Nemzeti Bajnokság I =

Nemzeti Bajnokság I
- Season: 1918–19
- Country: Hungary
- Champions: MTK

Statistics of Nemzeti Bajnokság I for the 1918–19 season.

== Overview ==
It was contested by 12 teams, and MTK Hungária FC won the championship.

== League standings ==
Pos	Team	Pld	W	D	L	GF	GA	GR	Pts
1	MTK Budapest FC	22	18	3	1	116	20	5.800	39
2	Ferencvárosi TC	21	15	5	1	43	8	5.375	35
3	Újpest FC	22	12	6	4	39	19	2.053	30
4	Vasas SC	21	9	6	6	20	19	1.053	24
5	Terézvárosi TC	22	9	5	8	29	45	0.644	23
6	III. Kerületi TUE	22	6	8	8	33	35	0.943	20
7	33 FC	22	5	7	10	17	31	0.548	17
8	Kispest AC	22	8	1	13	27	52	0.519	17
9	Budapesti TC	22	6	5	11	22	48	0.458	17
10	Törekvés SE	21	3	8	10	27	32	0.844	14
11	Budapesti AK	22	3	7	12	21	41	0.512	13
12	MÁV Gépgyári SK	20	3	3	14	22	66	0.333	9

Source: rsssf.com

== Results ==
Home \ Away	33F	KER	BAK	BTC	FTC	KIS	MÁV	MTK	TER	TÖR	ÚJP	VAS
33 FC		0–0	0–0	2–1	0–1	1–1	2–2	0–4	0–2	1–0	0–1	2–1
III. Kerület	1–1		1–0	4–0	0–4	3–0	4–0	1–5	1–1	1–1	2–3	0–0
Budapesti AK	0–2	3–3		1–2	0–3	3–2	0–2	1–6	0–2	–	0–2	1–1
Budapesti TC	1–0	1–0	1–3		0–3	4–2	3–2	0–6	0–1	0–0	0–1	1–0
Ferencváros	3–0	2–1	1–1	4–0		4–0	6–1	0–2	2–0	0–0	2–1	2–0
Kispest	2–0	0–2	1–0	3–0	0–2		2–0	1–9	0–4	3–2	0–5	0–1
MÁV Gépgyári	0–1	1–5	1–3	2–2	–	1–4		0–6	1–1	5–1	0–3	–
MTK Budapest	1–1	7–1	6–1	8–2	2–2	6–2	13–0		14–1	5–3	1–2	4–0
Terézváros	3–1	1–0	1–2	1–1	0–1	3–0	2–3	0–7		0–7	1–1	1–3
Törekvés	3–1	2–2	0–0	1–1	0–1	0–2	3–0	1–2	0–2		1–2	0–2
Újpest	4–2	1–1	2–1	2–2	0–0	0–1	3–0	1–2	1–1	1–1		3–0
Vasas	0–0	2–0	2–1	2–0	0–0	2–1	2–1	0–0	0–1	1–1	1–0	

Source: rsssf.com
Legend: Blue = home team win; Yellow = draw; Red = away team win.
