= 1958–59 Nemzeti Bajnokság II =

Nemzeti Bajnokság II
- Season: 1957–59
- Champions: Pécsi Dózsa (West); Szegedi EAC (East)
- Promoted: Pécsi Dózsa (West); Szegedi EAC (East)
- Relegated: Kaposvári Kinizsi (West); Kispesti Textil SE (West); Csepel Autó SE (West); Salgótarjáni Kohász SE (East); Miskolci Munkás TE (East); Ceglédi VSE (East)

The 1958–59 Nemzeti Bajnokság II was the 60th season of the Nemzeti Bajnokság II, the second tier of the Hungarian football league.

== League table ==
=== Western group ===
Pos	Team	Pld	W	D	L	GF	GA	GD	Pts	Promotion or relegation
1	Pécsi Dózsa	30	18	7	5	59	24	+35	43	Promotion to Nemzeti Bajnokság I
2	Komlói Bányász SK	30	18	5	7	54	33	+21	41	
3	Zalaegerszegi TE	30	13	10	7	45	25	+20	36	
4	Budai Spartacus	30	12	10	8	46	32	+14	34	
5	Szállítók SE	30	10	12	8	34	39	−5	32	
6	Váci Petőfi SE	29	11	9	9	40	32	+8	31	
7	Sztálinvárosi Kohász	29	11	7	11	39	32	+7	29	
8	Székesfehérvári Vasas SK	30	9	11	10	38	41	−3	29	
9	Oroszlányi Bányász SC	30	9	10	11	44	41	+3	28	
10	Budafoki MTE Kinizsi	30	11	6	13	35	40	−5	28	
11	Mosonmagyaróvári TE	30	10	8	12	34	43	−9	28	
12	Pécsi VSK	30	9	10	11	34	47	−13	28	
13	Láng Gépgyár SK	30	9	9	12	38	40	−2	27	
14	Kaposvári Kinizsi	30	10	7	13	33	44	−11	27	Relegation to Nemzeti Bajnokság III
15	KISTEXT SK	30	7	10	13	33	42	−9	24	Relegation to Nemzeti Bajnokság III
16	Csepel Autó SE	30	5	3	22	26	77	−51	13	Relegation to Nemzeti Bajnokság III

=== Eastern group ===
Pos	Team	Pld	W	D	L	GF	GA	GD	Pts	Promotion or relegation
1	Szegedi EAC	30	23	4	3	75	17	+58	50	Promotion to Nemzeti Bajnokság I
2	Debreceni VSC	30	16	7	7	49	34	+15	39	
3	Borsodi Bányász SK	30	13	8	9	37	30	+7	34	
4	Budapesti Előre SC	30	13	7	10	57	45	+12	33	
5	Jászberényi Vasas SC	30	12	9	9	44	40	+4	33	
6	Kecskeméti Dózsa	30	10	11	9	44	34	+10	31	
7	Egyetértés SC	30	11	9	10	52	47	+5	31	
8	Ózdi Kohász	30	10	9	11	32	42	−10	29	
9	Szegedi VSE	30	9	11	10	34	47	−13	29	
10	Budapesti Spartacus SC	30	7	13	10	40	47	−7	27	
11	Újpesti Tungsram TE	30	9	9	12	31	39	−8	27	
12	Szolnoki MÁV SE	30	9	8	13	44	41	+3	26	
13	Pénzügyőrök SE	30	8	9	13	34	41	−7	25	
14	Salgótarjáni Kohász SE	30	8	9	13	38	58	−20	25	Relegation to Nemzeti Bajnokság III
15	Miskolci Munkás TE	30	7	8	15	33	50	−17	22	Relegation to Nemzeti Bajnokság III
16	Ceglédi Vasutas SE	30	7	5	18	34	66	−32	19	Relegation to Nemzeti Bajnokság III

== See also ==
- 1958–59 Magyar Kupa
- 1958–59 Nemzeti Bajnokság I
