= 1918–19 Nemzeti Bajnokság II =

Nemzeti Bajnokság II
- Season: 1918–19
- Champions: Testvériség SE
- Promoted: Testvériség SE

The 1918–19 Nemzeti Bajnokság II season was the 19th edition of the Nemzeti Bajnokság II.

== League table ==
Pos	Team	Pld	W	D	L	GF	GA	GD	Pts	Promotion
1	Testvériség SE	22	15	4	3	60	21	+39	34	Not promoted
2	Nemzeti SC	22	14	5	3	41	18	+23	33	Promotion to Nemzeti Bajnokság I
3	Nyomdászok TE (Note: Merger with Pannónia Sport Körrel as V. kerületi Pannónia Sport Club.)	22	13	4	5	47	24	+23	30	
4	Óbudai TE	21	9	7	5	31	22	+9	25	
5	Erzsébetfalvi TC	22	9	6	7	43	35	+8	24	
6	Munkás TE (Note: Formerly known as Famunkások SC.)	22	9	3	10	34	40	−6	21	
7	Fővárosi TK	22	7	6	9	34	25	+9	20	
8	Újpest-Rákospalotai AK	21	8	2	11	31	33	−2	18	
9	VII. Kerületi SC (Note: Formerly known as Festőmunkások LE.)	22	5	6	11	24	34	−10	16	
10	Előre TK	22	5	4	13	39	58	−19	14	
11	Megyeri SC	22	5	4	13	18	49	−31	14	
12	Budapesti EVV TSE (Note: Formerly known as Budapesti Közúti Vaspálya Társaság TSE.)	20	5	1	14	19	62	−43	11	

== Countryside championships ==
=== Western district ===
Pos	Team	Pld	W	D	L	GF	GA	GD	Pts
1	Egyetértés TO	5	4	1	0	10	1	+9	9
2	Szombathelyi SE	5	3	1	1	6	5	+1	7
3	Pozsonyi TE	4	3	0	1	6	3	+3	6
4	Komáromi FC	4	2	0	2	3	7	−4	4
5	Tatabányai SC	5	1	0	4	2	11	−9	2
6	Soproni FAC (Note: withdrew)	5	0	0	5	0	0	0	0

== See also ==
- 1918–19 Nemzeti Bajnokság I
