= 1937–38 Nemzeti Bajnokság II =

Nemzeti Bajnokság II
- Season: 1937–38
- Champions: Zuglói SE; Szolnoki MÁV FC
- Promoted: Zuglói SE; Postás; BSzKRT SE; Vasas SC; Szolnoki MÁV FC

The 1937–38 Nemzeti Bajnokság II season was the 38th edition of the Nemzeti Bajnokság II.

== League table ==
=== Group I Budapest ===
Pos	Team	Pld	W	D	L	GF	GA	GD	Pts	Promotion
1	Zuglói SE	26	18	3	5	68	41	+27	39	Promotion to Nemzeti Bajnokság I
2	Újpesti TE II	26	16	4	6	59	37	+22	36	Promotion to Nemzeti Bajnokság I
3	Postás SE	26	15	5	6	60	36	+24	35	Promotion to Nemzeti Bajnokság I
4	BSzKRT SE	26	13	6	7	74	39	+35	32	Promotion to Nemzeti Bajnokság I
5	Vasas SC	26	11	9	6	46	44	+2	31	Promotion to Nemzeti Bajnokság I
6	Goldberger SE	26	9	9	8	46	41	+5	27	
7	Budapesti Vasutas SC	26	12	2	12	56	50	+6	26	
8	Budapesti LK	26	9	6	11	55	56	−1	24	
9	Herminamezei AC	26	10	3	13	53	65	−12	23	
10	Magyar Pamutipar SC	26	8	6	12	41	49	−8	22	
11	Megyeri SC	26	8	5	13	46	74	−28	21	
12	III. Kerületi TVE	26	9	2	15	48	64	−16	20	
13	Testvériség SE	26	5	4	17	41	66	−25	14	
14	Újpest-Rákospalotai AK	26	5	4	17	36	67	−31	14	

=== Group II ===
Pos	Team	Pld	W	D	L	GF	GA	GD	Pts	Promotion or relegation
1	Szolnoki MÁV	26	20	3	3	113	34	+79	43	Promotion to Nemzeti Bajnokság I
2	Csepel FC	26	20	2	4	104	30	+74	42	
3	Erzsébet FC	26	18	3	5	103	37	+66	39	Relegation
4	Diósgyőri VTK	26	17	4	5	71	38	+33	38	
5	Haladás VSE	26	16	2	8	78	40	+38	34	
6	Tokodi ÜSC	26	13	5	8	73	39	+34	31	
7	Salgótarjáni BTC	26	14	3	9	84	57	+27	31	
8	Alba Regia AK	26	10	3	13	67	55	+12	23	
9	Váci Reménység	26	8	4	14	46	77	−31	20	
10	Váci SE	26	7	6	13	45	76	−31	20	
11	Simontornyai BTC	26	6	3	17	47	88	−41	15	Relegation
12	VAC FC	26	6	3	17	42	89	−47	15	Relegation
13	Droguisták FC	26	2	5	19	22	103	−81	9	Relegation
14	Vasas FC	26	2	0	24	22	154	−132	4	

== See also ==
- 1937–38 Nemzeti Bajnokság I
