= 1957 Nemzeti Bajnokság II =

Nemzeti Bajnokság II
- Season: 1957
- Champions: Székesfehérvári Vasas; Nyíregyházi Építők; Szegedi Vasutas SE; Oroszlányi Bányász SK

The 1957 Nemzeti Bajnokság II was the 58th season of the Nemzeti Bajnokság II, the second tier of the Hungarian football league.

== League table ==
=== Group I ===
Pos	Team	Pld	W	D	L	GF	GA	GD	Pts
1	Székesfehérvári Vasas	14	9	1	4	37	20	+17	19
2	Veszprémi Egyetemi AC	14	9	1	4	40	26	+14	19
3	Mosonmagyaróvári TE	14	7	3	4	32	18	+14	17
4	Kaposvári MTE	14	6	2	6	17	24	−7	14
5	Szombathelyi Pamutipar	14	7	0	7	34	32	+2	14
6	Pécsbányatelepi Bányász	14	5	2	7	32	31	+1	12
7	Zalaegerszegi Ruhagyár	14	3	3	8	24	35	−11	9
8	Szekszárdi SC	14	3	2	9	18	48	−30	8

=== Group II ===
Pos	Team	Pld	W	D	L	GF	GA	GD	Pts
1	Nyíregyházi Építők	10	7	1	2	19	7	+12	15
2	Miskolci MTE	10	6	2	2	12	7	+5	14
3	Bükkaljai Bányász	10	6	1	3	15	13	+2	13
4	Baglyasaljai Bányász	10	2	3	5	15	16	−1	7
5	Hatvani Vasutas SE	10	2	3	5	9	16	−7	7
6	Debreceni Honvéd	10	1	2	7	13	24	−11	4

=== Group III ===
Pos	Team	Pld	W	D	L	GF	GA	GD	Pts
1	Szegedi Vasutas SE	10	5	4	1	24	9	+15	14
2	Makói Vasas	10	4	5	1	16	11	+5	13
3	Ceglédi Vasutas SE	10	4	2	4	19	16	+3	10
4	Gyulai Hunyadi	10	4	1	5	11	18	−7	9
5	Bajai Építők	10	2	4	4	14	20	−6	8
6	MÁVAG SK	10	3	0	7	19	29	−10	6

=== Group IV ===
Pos	Team	Pld	W	D	L	GF	GA	GD	Pts
1	Oroszlányi Bányász SK	10	8	0	2	31	12	+19	16
2	Jászberényi Vasas	10	8	0	2	33	17	+16	16
3	Délbudai Spartacus	10	6	0	4	17	16	+1	12
4	Láng-gépgyár SK	10	5	0	5	19	14	+5	10
5	Egyetértés SC	10	2	1	7	17	32	−15	5
6	Erzsébeti TC	10	0	1	9	10	36	−26	1

== See also ==
- 1955–58 Magyar Kupa
- 1957 Nemzeti Bajnokság I
