= 1923–24 Nemzeti Bajnokság I =

Nemzeti Bajnokság I
- Season: 1923–24
- Country: Hungary
- Champions: MTK Budapest FC
- Matches played: 132
- Goals scored: 317 (2.4 per match)

Statistics of Nemzeti Bajnokság I for the 1923–24 season.

== Overview ==
It was contested by 12 teams, and MTK Hungária FC won the championship.

== League standings ==
Pos	Team	Pld	W	D	L	GF	GA	GR	Pts
1	MTK Budapest FC	22	19	2	1	50	11	4.545	40
2	Ferencvárosi TC	22	11	8	3	36	15	2.400	30
3	Újpest FC	22	12	4	6	39	15	2.600	28
4	Budapesti TC	22	10	5	7	23	21	1.095	25
5	Vívó és Atlétikai Club	22	7	5	10	18	31	0.581	19
6	VII. Kerületi SC	22	7	5	10	16	28	0.571	19
7	Törekvés SE	22	6	6	10	28	29	0.966	18
8	III. Kerületi TUE	22	4	10	8	21	23	0.913	18
9	Vasas SC	22	7	4	11	28	36	0.778	18
10	Kispest AC	22	5	8	9	18	33	0.545	18
11	33 FC	22	5	7	10	14	27	0.519	17
12	Újpesti Törekvés SE	22	5	4	13	26	48	0.542	14

Source: rsssf.com

== Results ==
Home \ Away	33F	III	VII	BTC	FTC	KIS	MTK	TÖR	ÚJP	ÚTÖ	VAS	VIV
33 FC		0–0	1–2	0–2	0–0	0–1	0–2	0–5	0–2	3–0	0–0	0–1
III. Kerület	1–1		1–1	0–1	1–1	1–1	0–2	0–2	0–4	2–0	0–1	1–1
VII. Kerület	0–1	0–0		0–1	2–0	0–1	0–0	2–0	1–0	0–3	2–2	1–1
Budapesti TC	1–0	1–0	4–0		0–0	1–1	0–3	2–2	0–0	1–2	1–0	4–2
Ferencváros	1–1	1–1	3–0	3–0		2–0	0–2	4–1	2–0	4–0	2–2	0–0
Kispest	2–2	0–0	1–0	1–0	0–4		1–3	1–1	1–0	1–1	0–0	1–2
MTK Budapest	4–1	3–1	1–0	2–0	2–1	2–0		2–1	1–1	3–0	1–0	0–1
Törekvés	0–1	0–0	0–1	0–1	1–3	4–0	0–2		0–0	1–2	3–2	0–2
Újpest	2–0	2–1	5–0	1–2	1–2	3–1	0–2	1–1		4–1	4–0	4–0
Újpesti Törekvés	1–2	0–5	0–1	1–1	0–1	1–1	2–3	3–3	0–3		4–3	0–3
Vasas	0–1	0–4	3–0	1–0	1–2	4–3	2–4	0–2	0–1	3–2		3–0
Vivó AC	0–0	1–2	0–3	2–0	0–0	2–0	0–6	0–1	0–1	0–3	0–1	

Source: rsssf.com
Legend: Blue = home team win; Yellow = draw; Red = away team win.
