= 1919–20 Nemzeti Bajnokság I =

Nemzeti Bajnokság I
- Season: 1919–20
- Country: Hungary
- Champions: MTK

Statistics of Nemzeti Bajnokság I for the 1919–20 season.

== Overview ==
It was contested by 15 teams, and MTK Hungária FC won the championship.

== League standings ==
Pos	Team	Pld	W	D	L	GF	GA	GR	Pts
1	MTK Budapest FC	28	26	1	1	113	17	6.647	53
2	Kispest AC	28	19	5	4	52	21	2.476	43
3	Ferencvárosi TC	28	15	10	3	37	15	2.467	40
4	Törekvés SE	28	12	8	8	39	31	1.258	32
5	Budapesti TC	28	12	6	10	37	33	1.121	30
6	Vasas SC	28	10	9	9	31	26	1.192	29
7	Újpest FC	28	11	4	13	39	30	1.300	26
8	Magyar AC	28	10	6	12	35	42	0.833	26
9	III. Kerületi TUE	28	8	8	12	22	30	0.733	24
10	Budapesti AK	28	7	9	12	29	37	0.784	23
11	Terézvárosi TC	28	6	11	11	25	40	0.625	23
12	Nemzeti SC	28	6	8	14	29	56	0.518	20
13	Újpesti Törekvés SE	28	8	3	17	20	60	0.333	19
14	Műegyetemi AFC	28	5	6	17	12	47	0.255	16
15	33 FC	28	5	6	17	10	45	0.222	16

Source: rsssf.com

== Results ==
Home \ Away	33F	KER	BAK	BTC	FTC	KIS	MAC	MTK	MŰE	NEM	TER	TÖR	ÚJP	ÚTÖ	VAS
33 FC		1–1	0–1	3–2	0–3	0–1	1–2	0–6	1–0	1–0	0–0	0–1	0–1	1–1	1–0
III. Kerület	2–0		0–0	0–2	0–4	0–2	0–0	0–2	2–0	1–1	3–1	0–1	0–2	2–0	1–0
Budapesti AK	0–1	3–0		0–0	0–0	0–0	3–0	0–3	0–2	1–5	2–4	2–3	1–0	4–0	1–2
Budapesti TC	4–0	1–1	3–1		0–0	0–1	1–3	1–3	1–1	3–0	1–0	1–3	2–1	3–1	1–0
Ferencváros	0–0	0–0	0–0	0–1		0–2	3–3	1–2	2–0	0–0	1–0	2–1	3–0	1–0	1–0
Kispest	3–0	1–2	7–1	3–2	1–1		1–0	0–2	4–1	2–1	1–0	2–1	2–1	6–0	1–0
Magyar AC	3–0	1–4	1–1	0–2	1–2	1–0		0–3	4–1	1–0	0–1	0–6	1–0	4–0	1–1
MTK Budapest	4–0	2–1	2–0	6–0	0–1	5–2	4–1		9–0	12–2	3–1	3–2	1–1	6–0	3–0
Műegyetem	1–0	0–1	0–0	0–1	0–2	0–1	0–0	1–6		1–1	0–0	0–1	0–1	0–2	+:- (Note: The match between Műegyetem and Vasas was settled as a goalless win for Műegyetem.)
Nemzeti	4–0	1–0	1–6	2–1	0–1	0–0	0–3	0–4	1–0		1–1	1–2	0–2	6–2	1–5
Terézváro	0–0	1–0	0–0	1–0	1–1	0–2	2–2	0–5	0–2	1–1		3–1	1–1	0–2	2–5
Törekvés	1–0	1–1	1–0	0–0	1–1	0–0	0–2	2–4	0–1	0–0	2–2		2–1	3–1	0–1
Újpest	3–0	2–0	1–0	0–2	1–2	1–2	4–1	0–4	5–0	5–0	4–1	1–1		0–1	0–1
Újpesti Törekvés	0–0	0–0	0–1	2–1	1–3	0–3	1–0	1–4	1–0	1–0	0–2	1–2	2–1		0–4
Vasas	1–0	1–0	1–1	1–1	0–2	2–2	1–0	0–5	1–1	0–0	0–0	1–1	0–0	3–0	

Source: rsssf.com
Legend: Blue = home team win; Yellow = draw; Red = away team win.
