= 1917–18 Nemzeti Bajnokság II =

Nemzeti Bajnokság II
- Season: 1917–18
- Champions: Terézvárosi TC
- Promoted: Terézvárosi TC

The 1917–18 Nemzeti Bajnokság II season was the 18th edition of the Nemzeti Bajnokság II.

== League table ==
Pos	Team	Pld	W	D	L	GF	GA	GD	Pts	Promotion
1	Terézvárosi TC	20	15	2	3	38	12	+26	32	Promotion to Nemzeti Bajnokság I
2	Testvériség SE	20	13	4	3	58	23	+35	30	
3	Nemzeti SC	20	11	5	4	34	19	+15	27	
4	Fővárosi TK	20	12	2	6	40	18	+22	26	
5	Erzsébetfalvi TC	20	8	4	8	26	38	−12	20	
6	Óbudai TE	20	6	4	10	26	40	−14	16	
7	Újpest-Rákospalotai AK	20	3	8	9	25	32	−7	14	
8	Megyeri SC	20	4	6	10	20	28	−8	14	
9	Festőmunkások LE (Note: New name VII. kerületi Sport Club.)	20	6	2	12	19	38	−19	14	
10	Nyomdászok TE	20	4	5	11	19	37	−18	13	
11	Előre TK	20	5	4	11	25	42	−17	12 (Note: 2 points deducted)	
12	Budapesti KVT TSE (Note: Withdrew)	0	-	-	-	-	-	—	0	

== See also ==
- 1917–18 Nemzeti Bajnokság I
