= 1922–23 Nemzeti Bajnokság I =

Nemzeti Bajnokság I
- Season: 1922–23
- Country: Hungary
- Champions: MTK Budapest FC

Statistics of Nemzeti Bajnokság I for the 1922–23 season.

== Overview ==
It was contested by 12 teams, and MTK Hungária FC won the championship.

== League standings ==
Pos	Team	Pld	W	D	L	GF	GA	GR	Pts
1	MTK Budapest FC	22	17	3	2	61	15	4.067	37
2	Újpest FC	22	16	2	4	49	11	4.455	34
3	Ferencvárosi TC	22	12	8	2	34	17	2.000	32
4	Vasas SC	22	10	8	4	37	31	1.194	28
5	Törekvés SE	22	9	6	7	41	33	1.242	24
6	Vívó és Atlétikai Club	22	7	7	8	24	28	0.857	21
7	III. Kerületi TUE	22	8	5	9	25	38	0.658	21
8	Zuglói AC	22	7	5	10	20	32	0.625	19
9	Budapesti TC	22	6	5	11	21	36	0.583	17
10	Kispest AC	22	3	9	10	15	28	0.536	15
11	Magyar AC	22	3	2	17	10	37	0.270	8
12	Műegyetemi AFC	22	2	4	16	10	41	0.244	8

Source: rsssf.com

== Results ==
Home \ Away	KER	BTC	FTC	KIS	MAC	MTK	MŰE	TÖR	ÚJP	VAS	VIV	ZUG
III. Kerület		1–0	2–3	1–0	1–0	1–2	0–0	0–3	1–0	2–5	2–1	3–1
Budapesti TC	3–1		3–3	0–1	1–0	0–4	1–1	1–6	1–3	2–1	0–1	0–0
Ferencváros	2–2	2–1		1–0	3–0	2–0	0–0	2–2	0–0	2–0	2–0	2–0
Kispest	1–1	0–0	0–3		0–0	0–1	3–0	1–1	1–4	1–2	1–1	0–3
Magyar AC	5–1	0–1	0–1	1–1		1–3	0–1	1–0	0–1	0–1	0–3	0–2
MTK Budapest	1–0	3–1	3–0	3–0	4–0		1–0	4–2	0–0	2–2	2–2	4–0
Műegyetem	0–1	0–2	0–1	2–3	0–1	0–8		0–3	0–2	1–3	0–3	0–0
Törekvés	1–2	2–1	1–1	1–0	3–1	1–2	4–2		0–3	2–3	1–3	2–1
Újpest	5–1	5–0	2–1	1–0	3–0	2–0	1–0	2–3		3–0	5–0	1–0
Vasas	1–1	1–1	1–1	1–1	2–0	0–5	2–1	1–1	2–1		1–0	1–1
Vivó AC	0–0	0–2	0–0	1–1	2–0	1–5	1–0	2–2	1–0	2–2		0–1
Zugló	4–1	1–0	0–2	0–0	3–0	0–4	1–2	0–0	0–5	1–5	1–0	

Source: rsssf.com
Legend: Blue = home team win; Yellow = draw; Red = away team win.
