= 1981–82 Nemzeti Bajnokság II =

Nemzeti Bajnokság II
- Season: 1981–82
- Champions: Nagykanizsai Olajbányász (West); MTK-VM (Central); Kazincbarcika Vegyész (East)
- Promoted: None
- Relegated: several

The 1981–82 Nemzeti Bajnokság II was the 84th season of the Nemzeti Bajnokság II, the second tier of the Hungarian football league.

== League table ==
=== Western group ===
Pos	Team	Pld	W	D	L	GF	GA	GD	Pts	Relegation
1	Nagykanizsai Olajbányász SE	30	18	10	2	58	33	+25	46	
2	Tapolcai Bauxitbányász SE	30	17	7	6	53	25	+28	41	
3	Szekszárdi Dózsa SC	30	19	3	8	44	29	+15	41	
4	Keszthelyi Haladás SE	30	15	9	6	59	44	+15	39	
5	Sopron SE	30	15	8	7	45	33	+12	38	
6	Dunaújvárosi Kohász	30	15	6	9	49	28	+21	36	Relegation to Nemzeti Bajnokság III
7	Kaposvári Rákóczi SC	30	14	6	10	44	29	+15	34	Relegation to Nemzeti Bajnokság III
8	Sabaria SE	30	12	9	9	34	31	+3	33	Relegation to Nemzeti Bajnokság III
9	Mohács-Véméndi TE	30	12	6	12	43	33	+10	30	Relegation to Nemzeti Bajnokság III
10	Komlói Bányász SK	30	11	6	13	38	38	0	28	Relegation to Nemzeti Bajnokság III
11	Pécsi VSK	30	11	3	16	38	45	−7	25	Relegation to Nemzeti Bajnokság III
12	Ajkai Aluminium SK	30	7	8	15	43	53	−10	22	Relegation to Nemzeti Bajnokság III
13	MÁV Dunántúli AC	30	7	7	16	41	65	−24	21	Relegation to Nemzeti Bajnokság III
14	Bakony Vegyész TC	30	5	8	17	27	54	−27	18	Relegation to Nemzeti Bajnokság III
15	Várpalotai Bányász SK	30	5	5	20	24	48	−24	15	Relegation to Nemzeti Bajnokság III
16	Dombóvári MSC	30	5	3	22	26	78	−52	13	Relegation to Nemzeti Bajnokság III

=== Central group ===
Pos	Team	Pld	W	D	L	GF	GA	GD	Pts	Relegation
1	MTK-VM	30	21	2	7	67	23	+44	44	
2	22.sz Volán SC	30	17	5	8	53	32	+21	39	
3	Dorogi AC	30	16	6	8	45	27	+18	38	
4	Kecskeméti SC	30	13	10	7	47	35	+12	36	
5	Ganz-MÁVAG	30	13	9	8	48	35	+13	35	
6	Váci Izzó MTE	30	13	9	8	39	34	+5	35	Relegation to Nemzeti Bajnokság III
7	Budafoki MTE Kinizsi	30	13	6	11	40	44	−4	32	Relegation to Nemzeti Bajnokság III
8	Székesfehérvári MÁV Előre	30	12	7	11	54	49	+5	31	Relegation to Nemzeti Bajnokság III
9	BVSC	30	12	6	12	46	42	+4	30	Relegation to Nemzeti Bajnokság III
10	Balassagyarmati SE	30	9	9	12	37	38	−1	27	Relegation to Nemzeti Bajnokság III
11	Pénzügyőr SE	30	5	16	9	26	36	−10	26	Relegation to Nemzeti Bajnokság III
12	Kossuth KFSE	30	9	8	13	41	53	−12	26	Relegation to Nemzeti Bajnokság III
13	BKV Előre	30	7	9	14	32	47	−15	23	Relegation to Nemzeti Bajnokság III
14	Szegedi Dózsa	30	7	7	16	37	58	−21	21	Relegation to Nemzeti Bajnokság III
15	Építők SC	30	7	5	18	33	57	−24	19	Relegation to Nemzeti Bajnokság III
16	Bábolnai SE	30	6	6	18	36	71	−35	18	Relegation to Nemzeti Bajnokság III

=== Eastern group ===
Pos	Team	Pld	W	D	L	GF	GA	GD	Pts	Relegation
1	Kazincbarcikai Vegyész	30	18	7	5	51	22	+29	43	
2	Eger SE	30	15	11	4	47	26	+21	41	
3	Hódmezővásárhelyi MSE	30	14	8	8	53	32	+21	36	
4	Debreceni Kinizsi	30	12	12	6	50	37	+13	36	
5	Salgótarjáni TC	30	12	11	7	39	29	+10	35	
6	Honvéd Szabó Lajos SE	30	12	9	9	46	34	+12	33	Relegation to Nemzeti Bajnokság III
7	Gyulai SE	30	12	7	11	46	43	+3	31	Relegation to Nemzeti Bajnokság III
8	Szarvasi Főiskola Spartacus SC	30	12	6	12	42	41	+1	30	Relegation to Nemzeti Bajnokság III
9	Szolnoki MÁV MTE	30	8	12	10	22	27	−5	28	Relegation to Nemzeti Bajnokság III
10	Honvéd Papp József SE	30	10	7	13	41	46	−5	27	Relegation to Nemzeti Bajnokság III
11	Honvéd Bem József SE	30	7	12	11	35	41	−6	26	Relegation to Nemzeti Bajnokság III
12	Lehel SC	30	9	8	13	33	39	−6	26	Relegation to Nemzeti Bajnokság III
13	Debreceni Universitas SE	30	8	9	13	31	39	−8	25	Relegation to Nemzeti Bajnokság III
14	Honvéd Asztalos János SE	30	6	10	14	28	53	−25	22	Relegation to Nemzeti Bajnokság III
15	Miskolci VSC	30	5	11	14	28	55	−27	21	Relegation to Nemzeti Bajnokság III
16	Gyöngyösi SE	30	6	8	16	20	48	−28	20	Relegation to Nemzeti Bajnokság III

== Promotion play-off ==
Leg	Team 1	Result	Team 2	Date and location
1st leg	Kazincbarcikai Vegyész	1–0 (0–0)	MTK VM	30 May 1982, Kazincbarcika 17:00 CET
2nd leg	MTK VM	2–0 (1–0)	Kazincbarcikai Vegyész	unknown

== See also ==
- 1981–82 Magyar Kupa
- 1981–82 Nemzeti Bajnokság I
