= 1945 Nemzeti Bajnokság II =

Nemzeti Bajnokság II
- Season: 1945
- Champions: Békéscsabai Törekvés (Békéscsaba); Elektromos MTE (Budapest); Debreceni VSC (Debrecen); Soproni VSE (Győr); Diósgyőri VTK (Miskolc)
- Promoted: Elektromos FC (Budapest); Debreceni VSC (Debrecen); Dorogi AC (Középmagyar); Diósgyőri VTK (Miskolc); Pécsi Vasutas SK (Pécs); Szeged AK (Szeged)

The 1945 Nemzeti Bajnokság II season was the 46th edition of the Nemzeti Bajnokság II.

== League table ==
=== Békéscsaba group ===
Pos	Team	Pld	W	D	L	GF	GA	GD	Pts
1	Békéscsabai Törekvés	3	3	0	0	9	4	+5	6
2	Csabai AK	3	1	1	1	9	6	+3	3
3	Békéscsabai MÁV-Rokka vegyes	3	0	2	1	4	5	−1	2
4	Alföldi Első Gazdasági Vasút	3	0	1	2	3	10	−7	1

=== Budapest group ===
Pos	Team	Pld	W	D	L	GF	GA	GD	Pts
1	Elektromos MTE	22	18	1	3	106	30	+76	37
2	MÁV Előre	22	15	2	5	72	27	+45	32
3	Budapesti Vasutas SC	22	15	1	6	79	38	+41	31
4	Magyar Acél SE	22	14	1	7	65	52	+13	29
5	Phöbus SE	22	11	4	7	82	37	+45	26
6	VI. ker. Barátság	22	10	3	9	59	37	+22	23
7	Testvériség SE	22	10	3	9	38	49	−11	23
8	Ganz-hajógyár	22	9	4	9	61	53	+8	22
9	Jutagyári Báthori TE	22	7	3	12	30	69	−39	17
10	Barátság TK	22	7	2	13	36	98	−62	16
11	Hirmann SC	22	1	4	17	20	77	−57	6
12	Terézvárosi LK	22	1	0	21	9	97	−88	2

=== Debreceni group ===
Pos	Team	Pld	W	D	L	GF	GA	GD	Pts
1	Debreceni MÁV Bocskai	0	-	-	-	-	-	—	0
-	Debreceni MTE	0	-	-	-	-	-	—	0
-	Debreceni Postás	0	-	-	-	-	-	—	0
-	Debreceni VSC (Note: Promoted without winning the group.)	0	-	-	-	-	-	—	0
-	Debreceni MaDISz	0	-	-	-	-	-	—	0
-	Debreceni KASE	0	-	-	-	-	-	—	0

=== Győri group ===
Pos	Team	Pld	W	D	L	GF	GA	GD	Pts
1	Soproni VSE	7	6	1	0	26	0	+26	13
2	Soproni FAC	7	4	1	2	24	14	+10	9
3	Kapuvári SE	5	4	0	1	16	6	+10	8
4	Soproni Sotex SE	6	3	2	1	14	7	+7	8
5	Soproni MaDISz TE	7	2	0	5	12	42	−30	4
6	Csornai SE	6	1	0	5	4	6	−2	2
7	Soproni Vasárúgyár SK	6	0	0	6	7	26	−19	0

=== Miskolci group ===
Pos	Team	Pld	W	D	L	GF	GA	GD	Pts
1	Diósgyőri Vasas TK	0	-	-	-	71	14	+57	23
2	Perecesi TK	0	-	-	-	77	19	+58	23
3	Miskolci Vasutas SC	0	-	-	-	-	-	—	20
4	MÁV Sátoraljaújhelyi AC	0	-	-	-	-	-	—	12
5	Ózdi VTK	0	-	-	-	-	-	—	12
6	Miskolci MTE	0	-	-	-	-	-	—	11
7	Sátoraljaújhelyi Egyetértés SC	0	-	-	-	-	-	—	9
8	Alberttelepi BTK	14	1	0	13	-	-	—	2

=== Középmagyar (Dunántúl) group ===
Pos	Team	Pld	W	D	L	GF	GA	GD	Pts
1	Dorogi AC	0	-	-	0	-	-	—	0
2	Esztergomi MTE	0	-	-	-	-	-	—	0
3	Pilisszentiváni TE	0	-	-	-	-	-	—	0
4	Pilisvörösvári SE	0	-	-	-	-	-	—	0

=== Középmagyar (Érd) group ===
Pos	Team	Pld	W	D	L	GF	GA	GD	Pts
-	Törökbálinti MaDISz	0	-	-	-	-	-	—	0
-	Érdligeti SC	0	-	-	-	-	-	—	0
-	Sóskúti AC	0	-	-	-	-	-	—	0

=== Középmagyar (Monor) group ===
Pos	Team	Pld	W	D	L	GF	GA	GD	Pts
-	Monori Munkás SE	0	-	-	-	-	-	—	0
-	Vecsési MTK	0	-	-	-	-	-	—	0
-	Gyömrői MaDISz TE	0	-	-	-	-	-	—	0
-	Üllői Iparos	0	-	-	-	-	-	—	0
-	Pilisi MaDISz TE	0	-	-	-	-	-	—	0
-	Üllői MaDISz TE	0	-	-	-	-	-	—	0
-	Pestszentimrei MTK	0	-	-	-	-	-	—	0
-	Maglódi MaDISz TE	0	-	-	-	-	-	—	0

=== Középmagyar (Vác) group ===
Pos	Team	Pld	W	D	L	GF	GA	GD	Pts
1	Váci SE	0	-	-	-	-	-	—	0
2	Váci Reménység FC	0	-	-	-	-	-	—	0
3	Váci MaDISz TE	0	-	-	-	-	-	—	0
4	Váci AC	0	-	-	-	-	-	—	0
5	Váci Gimnázium	0	-	-	-	-	-	—	0
-	Fóti SE	0	-	-	-	-	-	—	0
-	Dunakeszi MÁV Magyarság II.	0	-	-	-	-	-	—	0
-	Alagi SC	0	-	-	-	-	-	—	0
-	Kisalagi SE	0	-	-	-	-	-	—	0
-	Dunakeszi Barátság	0	-	-	-	-	-	—	0

=== Pécsi group ===
Pos	Team	Pld	W	D	L	GF	GA	GD	Pts
1	Pécsi VSK	7	6	1	0	-	-	—	13
2	DVAC	7	5	1	1	-	-	—	11
3	Pécsi BTC	7	5	1	1	-	-	—	11
4	Pécsbányatelepi MSE	7	3	1	3	-	-	—	7
5	Mecsekszabolcsi SE	7	1	2	4	-	-	—	4
6	Zsolnay-gyári SE	7	2	0	5	-	-	—	4
7	Pécsi Postás SE	7	1	0	6	-	-	—	2
8	Pécsi EAC	7	0	0	7	-	-	—	0
9	Pécsi LE	0	-	-	-	-	-	—	0

=== Szegedi (north) group ===
Pos	Team	Pld	W	D	L	GF	GA	GD	Pts
1	Kecskeméti TE	10	7	2	1	33	13	+20	16
2	Kiskunfélegyházi Remény VSE	10	7	1	2	28	16	+12	15
3	Csongrádi TK (Note: formerly known as Csongrádi LE)	10	4	2	4	22	21	+1	10
4	Kiskunfélegyházi TK	10	3	2	5	27	31	−4	8
5	Kecskeméti AC	10	3	1	6	31	32	−1	7
6	Kisteleki TE	10	1	2	7	18	46	−28	4
7	Szentesi TE (Note: withdrew and then dissolved, formerly known as MOVE Szentesi TE)	0	-	-	-	-	-	—	0

=== Szegedi group ===
Pos	Team	Pld	W	D	L	GF	GA	GD	Pts
1	Szeged AK	11	10	0	1	65	10	+55	20
2	Tisza Vasutas SE	11	9	0	2	61	12	+49	18
3	Makói Vasutas SE	11	7	1	3	42	12	+30	15
4	Szegedi MTE	11	7	1	3	54	17	+37	15
5	Hódmezővásárhelyi MTE	11	5	3	3	30	21	+9	13
6	Alsóvárosi TE	11	5	2	4	40	31	+9	12
7	Felsővárosi IE	11	5	1	5	24	31	−7	11
8	Szegedi Postás	11	4	1	6	21	37	−16	9
9	Móravárosi TE	11	3	1	7	28	44	−16	7
10	Szőregi Rákóczi	11	1	3	7	22	49	−27	5
11	Dorozsmai FC	11	2	1	8	21	52	−31	5
12	Szegedi EAC	11	1	0	10	5	97	−92	2

== See also ==
- 1945 Nemzeti Bajnokság I
