= 1924–25 Nemzeti Bajnokság I =

Nemzeti_Bajnokság_I
- Season: 1924–25
- Champions: MTK Hungária FC
- Relegated: VII. Kerületi SC; Budapesti TC
- Matches played: 132
- Goals scored: 348 (2.64 per match)

Statistics of Nemzeti Bajnokság I for the 1924–25 season.

== Overview ==
It was contested by 12 teams, and MTK Hungária FC won the championship.

== League standings ==
Pos	Team	Pld	W	D	L	GF	GA	GR	Pts
1	MTK Budapest FC	22	18	2	2	65	16	4.063	38
2	Ferencvárosi TC	22	11	8	3	37	24	1.542	30
3	Vasas SC	22	10	7	5	38	25	1.520	27
4	III. Kerületi TUE	22	7	9	6	24	25	0.960	23
5	Újpest FC	22	7	8	7	29	18	1.611	22
6	Nemzeti SC	22	8	6	8	29	32	0.906	22
7	Vívó és Atlétikai Club	22	7	8	7	19	23	0.826	22
8	Kispest AC	22	6	7	9	20	28	0.714	19
9	Budapesti EAC	22	7	4	11	21	45	0.467	18
10	Törekvés SE	22	4	8	10	30	34	0.882	16
11	VII. Kerületi SC	22	4	7	11	23	42	0.548	15
12	Budapesti TC	22	3	6	13	13	26	0.500	12

Source: rsssf.com

== Results ==
Home \ Away	III	VII	BEAC	BTC	FTC	KIS	MTK	NEM	TÖR	ÚJP	VAS	VIV
III. Kerület		1–1	1–0	1–1	1–1	0–2	0–3	2–0	1–1	1–0	1–2	0–0
VII. Kerület	1–1		2–3	1–0	3–3	1–1	0–7	0–3	0–1	1–1	0–0	2–2
Budapesti EAC	5–0	0–2		0–0	1–0	3–2	0–2	0–1	0–9	1–0	2–4	1–0
Budapesti TC	0–3	0–3	0–1		1–0	0–1	0–3	1–0	2–2	0–1	0–6	1–0
Ferencváros	3–0	3–0	5–0	2–0		2–0	2–1	2–2	1–1	1–1	1–1	2–0
Kispest	0–3	1–0	2–0	1–1	0–1		0–4	0–2	3–1	0–0	1–1	0–1
MTK Budapest	2–1	5–1	0–0	2–1	11–2	2–0		6–2	5–1	1–0	1–0	1–0
Nemzeti	2–2	2–0	6–2	2–1	0–0	1–1	1–2		1–0	0–6	1–2	0–0
Törekvés	0–1	3–2	1–1	3–1	0–2	1–2	2–2	0–0		1–3	0–2	0–0
Újpest	1–1	0–2	4–0	0–0	1–2	1–1	1–0	1–2	1–1		1–1	0–2
Vasas	0–0	3–0	3–0	3–3	0–2	2–1	1–2	2–1	2–1	0–3		2–2
Vivó	0–3	2–1	1–1	1–0	0–0	1–1	1–3	2–0	2–1	0–3	2–1	

Source: rsssf.com
Legend: Blue = home team win; Yellow = draw; Red = away team win.
