= 1948–49 Nemzeti Bajnokság I =

Annual Hungarian soccer tournament

Nemzeti Bajnokság I
- Season: 1948–49
- Champions: Ferencvárosi TC

Statistics of Nemzeti Bajnokság I in the 1948–49 season. With an average attendance of 22,933, Ferencváros recorded by far the highest average home league attendance.

== Overview ==
It was contested by 16 teams, and Ferencvárosi TC won the championship.

== League standings ==
Pos	Team	Pld	W	D	L	GF	GA	GR	Pts
1	Ferencvárosi TC	30	26	1	3	140	36	3.889	53
2	MTK Budapest FC	30	18	6	6	91	38	2.395	42
3	Kispest AC	30	19	3	8	94	46	2.043	41
4	Újpest FC	30	18	5	7	89	47	1.894	41
5	Csepel SC	30	15	5	10	67	66	1.015	35
6	Szentlőrinci AC	30	13	8	9	39	44	0.886	34
7	Vasas SC	30	15	2	13	68	51	1.333	32
8	MATEOSZ	30	12	5	13	67	53	1.264	29
9	Győri ETO FC	30	12	5	13	56	88	0.636	29
10	Szombathelyi Haladás	30	11	6	13	56	60	0.933	28
11	Salgótarjáni BTC	30	10	6	14	58	69	0.841	26
12	Soroksár FC	30	11	4	15	40	63	0.635	26
13	FC Tatabánya	30	9	3	18	53	87	0.609	21
14	Szegedi Bástya	30	7	5	18	38	80	0.475	19
15	Kispesti Textil SE	30	4	4	22	40	104	0.385	12
16	Goldberger SE	30	4	4	22	24	88	0.273	12

Source: rsssf.com

== Results ==
Home \ Away	CSE	FTC	GOL	GYŐ	KIS	KTX	LOK	MAT	MTK	SAL	SOR	SZE	SZN	TAT	ÚJP	VAS
Csepel		3–1	3–2	7–2	3–2	3–1	1–1	2–1	1–0	4–1	2–0	2–0	1–1	7–4	2–5	2–4
Ferencváros	6–2		2–0	13–0	4–1	8–0	5–1	2–1	1–1	3–1	6–0	7–0	2–1	5–0	5–3	4–2
Goldberger SE	1–2	1–7		1–1	2–1	1–6	0–5	0–7	0–3	0–2	3–2	1–2	0–0	2–3	1–2	0–7
Győr	3–5	0–4	0–1		4–0	1–1	3–2	4–2	0–0	1–0	1–4	2–1	5–0	1–3	3–3	2–1
Kispest AC	6–1	1–2	7–0	11–3		3–1	1–0	5–1	1–2	5–1	6–0	7–0	4–0	3–1	3–1	2–0
Kispesti Textil	1–1	1–5	3–2	0–3	2–6		1–3	0–6	2–10	2–8	0–1	1–2	1–2	2–4	1–9	0–2
Lokomotiv Szombathely	1–3	0–4	1–1	1–1	3–3	1–2		2–2	1–0	0–3	2–3	3–3	2–3	4–3	2–1	2–1
MATEOSZ	2–0	1–5	3–0	3–0	2–3	2–3	6–1		1–3	1–1	3–1	3–1	0–1	4–2	2–2	2–0
MTK Budapest	4–1	4–2	7–0	8–1	0–0	4–2	3–0	3–0		4–2	3–1	6–1	3–3	4–0	2–3	1–2
Salgótarján	2–0	1–7	3–2	3–5	3–3	1–1	1–7	0–3	3–5		2–0	3–1	0–0	6–1	1–2	3–2
Soroksár	2–2	0–3	1–0	1–0	5–2	3–3	0–3	0–0	3–1	2–0		0–2	1–3	1–0	2–2	0–5
Szegedi Bástya	1–3	2–9	1–2	0–3	1–2	1–0	1–3	1–2	1–1	3–3	2–1		1–0	1–1	1–5	2–2
Szentlőrinc	1–0	0–5	1–0	2–3	0–1	2–0	2–0	2–1	0–0	1–1	0–2	2–1		5–3	2–2	1–1
Tatabánya	2–2	2–6	0–0	3–4	2–1	3–2	1–2	3–1	2–5	2–1	1–0	1–2	0–3		1–2	2–1
Újpest	6–1	5–0	4–0	3–0	1–2	3–1	2–1	2–2	2–3	1–0	5–2	2–1	4–0	5–1		1–3
Vasas	3–1	2–7	2–1	5–0	1–2	4–0	0–2	4–3	2–1	1–2	1–2	3–2	0–1	5–2	2–1	

Source: rsssf.com
Legend: Blue = home team win; Yellow = draw; Red = away team win.

== Statistical leaders ==
=== Top goalscorers ===
Rank	Scorer	Club	Goals
1	(Hungarian Republic (1946–49)) Ferenc Deák	Ferencvárosi TC	59
2	(Hungarian Republic (1946–49)) Ferenc Puskás	Kispest AC	46
3	(Hungarian Republic (1946–49)) Ferenc Szusza	Újpesti TE	37
4	(Hungarian Republic (1946–49)) Sándor Kocsis	Ferencvárosi TC	33
5	(Hungarian Republic (1946–49)) Gyula Szilágyi	Vasas SC	28
6	(Hungarian Republic (1946–49)) Nándor Hidegkuti	MTK Budapest	26
7	(Hungarian Republic (1946–49)) Gyula Balla	FC Tatabánya	19
8	(Hungarian Republic (1946–49)) Zoltán Czibor	Ferencvárosi TC	18
8	(Hungarian Republic (1946–49)) Mihály Keszthelyi	Csepel SC	18
10	(Hungarian Republic (1946–49)) István Kovács	Szombathelyi Haladás	17
10	(Hungarian Republic (1946–49)) János Zsolnai	MATEOSZ MSE	17

== See also ==
- 1948–49 Nemzeti Bajnokság II
