= 1949–50 Nemzeti Bajnokság I =

Nemzeti Bajnokság I
- Season: 1949–50
- Champions: Budapest Honvéd FC

Statistics of Nemzeti Bajnokság I in the 1949–50 season. With an average attendance of 22,000, ÉDOSZ recorded the highest average home league attendance.

== Overview ==
It was contested by 16 teams, and Budapest Honvéd FC won the championship.

== League standings ==
Pos	Team	Pld	W	D	L	GF	GA	GR	Pts
1	Budapest Honvéd FC	30	23	4	3	84	29	2.897	50
2	ÉDOSZ	30	21	4	5	86	38	2.263	46
3	Textiles	30	18	8	4	81	33	2.455	44
4	Csepel SC	30	15	8	7	66	45	1.467	38
5	Bp. Dózsa	30	14	9	7	71	52	1.365	37
6	Vasas SC	30	15	5	10	67	44	1.523	35
7	Győri ETO FC	30	13	7	10	63	45	1.400	33
8	Teherfuvar	30	10	11	9	59	51	1.157	31
9	Dorogi Tárna	30	11	6	13	60	58	1.034	28
10	Salgótarjáni BTC	30	10	8	12	51	56	0.911	28
11	Budapesti Postás SE	30	9	10	11	45	59	0.763	28
12	Szombathelyi Haladás	30	10	4	16	52	67	0.776	24
13	Budapesti Előre	30	6	5	19	51	93	0.548	17
14	Nagykanizsa	30	3	9	18	35	85	0.412	15
15	Soroksár FC	30	4	5	21	32	84	0.381	13
16	Debreceni VSC	30	4	5	21	39	103	0.379	13

Source: rsssf.com

== Results ==
Home \ Away	CSE	DEB	DOR	DÓZ	ÉDO	ELŐ	GYŐ	HON	LOK	NAG	POS	SAL	SOR	TEH	TEX	VAS
Csepel SC		4–2	1–2	2–2	0–1	3–3	3–1	2–0	2–0	2–0	5–1	5–1	4–0	2–2	2–2	3–2
Debrecen	1–2		4–2	1–1	1–1	3–3	1–3	0–2	1–0	3–3	1–3	3–2	2–2	2–8	1–7	0–7
Dorogi Tárna	1–1	9–0		1–1	2–1	2–5	3–5	0–2	0–1	3–2	1–0	3–1	2–1	6–2	0–2	0–3
Budapesti Dózsa	2–2	+:- (Note: The match between Budapesti Dózsa and Debrecen was settled with a goalless victory for Budapesti Dózsa.)	1–0		1–4	6–2	3–5	1–4	2–0	6–0	4–1	2–2	5–1	6–1	1–2	1–0
ÉDOSZ	5–1	7–1	2–1	8–1		3–1	1–0	0–2	3–2	2–2	3–0	2–1	5–0	3–1	1–6	5–1
Budapesti Előre	1–2	1–0	2–8	0–5	0–2		4–2	1–4	1–5	1–2	3–4	1–3	2–3	0–6	0–0	3–2
Győri Vasas	4–2	3–0	2–2	1–1	3–1	0–1		0–4	5–0	2–2	1–1	3–1	2–0	2–1	1–1	0–0
Budapest Honvéd	2–0	3–1	7–2	3–0	0–0	5–4	1–0		4–0	4–1	4–1	2–1	4–2	1–1	4–0	0–1
Lokomotiv Szombathely	2–4	4–1	0–2	1–2	2–7	4–1	1–0	0–4		5–1	1–1	5–1	3–1	3–2	2–3	2–4
Nagykanizsa	0–2	2–1	2–1	2–2	1–4	1–1	0–7	1–3	1–3		2–2	1–3	0–0	0–2	1–6	2–2
Postás	0–3	4–1	1–1	1–1	1–3	3–2	1–1	1–1	1–1	1–0		0–0	6–0	2–2	1–2	2–1
Salgótarjáni BTC	1–1	4–2	2–2	3–3	2–2	1–3	2–0	1–2	4–2	5–1	2–0		1–0	1–1	1–0	0–3
Soroksár	2–1	4–2	0–1	0–3	0–4	2–2	0–3	1–6	2–2	3–2	1–2	1–3		1–2	2–8	1–1
Teherfuvar	1–2	0–3	2–2	2–1	1–3	4–2	3–2	1–1	1–1	5–0	2–3	1–1	1–0		1–1	0–0
Textiles	1–1	7–0	3–0	2–3	3–1	3–1	3–2	2–3	4–0	1–1	3–0	4–1	2–1	0–0		1–1
Vasas	3–2	5–1	2–1	1–4	1–2	5–0	2–3	4–2	2–0	3–2	7–1	1–0	3–1	0–3	0–2	

Source: rsssf.com
Legend: Blue = home team win; Yellow = draw; Red = away team win.

== Statistical leaders ==
=== Top goal-scorers ===
Rank	Scorer	Club	Goals
1	(Hungary) Ferenc Puskás	Budapest Honvéd	31
2	(Hungary) Nándor Hidegkuti	Budapesti Textiles	22
2	(Hungary) Gyula Szilágyi	Vasas SC	22
4	(Hungary) Sándor Kocsis	ÉDOSZ SE	21
5	(Hungary) Gusztáv Aspirány	Dorogi Tárna	16
5	(Hungary) Ignác Kertesi	Győri ETO FC	16
5	(Hungary) Lajos Pap	Szombathelyi VSE	16
8	(Hungary) József Molnár	Dorogi Tárna	15
8	(Hungary) János Zsolnai	Budapesti Teherfuvar	15

== See also ==
- 1949–50 Nemzeti Bajnokság II
