= 1938–39 Nemzeti Bajnokság II =

Nemzeti Bajnokság II
- Season: 1938–39
- Champions: Szombathelyi Haladás VSE (West); Törekvés SE (East)
- Promoted: Szombathelyi Haladás VSE (West); Törekvés SE (East)
- Relegated: Pécsi DVAC (West); Váci Reménység (East); Mezőtúri AFC (East); Váci SE (East)

The 1938–39 Nemzeti Bajnokság II season was the 39th edition of the Nemzeti Bajnokság II.

== League table ==
=== Western group ===
Pos	Team	Pld	W	D	L	GF	GA	GD	Pts	Promotion or relegation
1	Szombathelyi Haladás VSE	26	19	4	3	73	26	+47	42	Promotion to Nemzeti Bajnokság I
2	Lampart FC	26	16	6	4	73	28	+45	38	
3	Soproni FAC	26	16	3	7	65	58	+7	35	
4	UTE	26	13	2	11	55	44	+11	28	
5	Tokodi ÜSC	26	9	9	8	48	35	+13	27	
6	Győri Egyetértés TO	26	11	5	10	47	51	−4	27	
7	Alba Regia AK	26	11	4	11	76	52	+24	26	
8	BSzKRT	26	11	3	12	50	57	−7	25	
9	Postás SE	26	10	4	12	50	65	−15	24	
10	Tatabányai SC	26	7	9	10	41	46	−5	23	
11	Vasas	26	9	5	12	37	54	−17	23	
12	Pénzügyi TBSC	26	6	5	15	41	65	−24	17	
13	Rákoskeresztúri TE	26	7	1	18	42	88	−46	15	
14	Pécsi DVAC	26	5	4	17	39	68	−29	14	Relegation

=== Eastern group ===
Pos	Team	Pld	W	D	L	GF	GA	GD	Pts	Promotion or relegation
1	Törekvés SE	26	21	2	3	95	33	+62	44	Promotion to Nemzeti Bajnokság I
2	Weisz Manfréd FC	26	20	3	3	98	30	+68	43	
3	Diósgyőri MÁVAG	26	16	5	5	71	33	+38	37	
4	Ferencvárosi TC II	26	15	6	5	61	31	+30	36	
5	Salgótarjáni BTC	26	16	2	8	83	43	+40	34	
6	Perecesi TK	26	10	4	12	53	60	−7	24	
7	Szegedi AK	26	8	6	12	40	52	−12	22	
8	Csepeli MOVE	26	8	5	13	51	65	−14	21	
9	Szentlőrinci AC	26	10	1	15	41	71	−30	21	
10	MÁVAG	26	8	4	14	43	49	−6	20	
11	Debreceni VSC	26	6	8	12	42	60	−18	20	
12	Váci Reménység	26	8	2	16	40	85	−45	18	Relegation
13	Mezőtúri AFC	26	6	3	17	32	61	−29	15	Relegation
14	Váci SE	26	4	1	21	27	104	−77	9	Relegation

== Relegation playoff ==
=== West ===
Team		Team
Rákoskeresztúri TE	3–0 (0–0)	Lévai TE
Lévai TE	2–0 (0–0)	Rákoskeresztúri TE
Ungvári AC	1–2 (0–2)	Pénzügyőr
Pénzügyőr	5–1 (1–1)	Ungvári AC

=== East ===
Losonci AFC - Mezőtúri AFC 2–0 (0–0), 0–0

Kassai SC - Váci Reménység 0–0, 2–2 (1–2), 2–1 (1–1)

== See also ==
- 1938–39 Magyar Kupa
- 1938–39 Nemzeti Bajnokság I
