= Ungvári AC =

Hungarian football club

- Full name: Ungvári Athletikai Club
- Founded: 1906
Home colours	Away colours

Ungvári Athletikai Club was a football club from the town of Ungvár, Hungary.

== History ==
Ungvári AC competed in the 1943–44 Nemzeti Bajnokság II after Transcarpathia was annexed by Hungary during World War II. Ungvári AC won the season and gained promotion to the Nemzeti Bajnokság I. However, the 1944-45 Nemzeti Bajnokság I season was suspended due to World War II. Ungvári AC lost their three matches in the season.

In 1945, the club dissolved.

== Honours ==
=== League ===
- Nemzeti Bajnokság II:
  - Winners (1): 1943–44
