= Budapesti MÁVAG SK =

Hungarian football club

- Full name: Budapesti MÁVAG Sport Kör
- Founded: 1910
- Dissolved: 1959
| Home colours | Away colours |

Budapesti MÁVAG Sport Kör was a Hungarian football club from the town of Budapest. The club was founded by the workers of MÁVAG.

== History ==
Budapesti MÁVAG Sport Kör debuted in the 1917–18 season of the Hungarian League and finished ninth.

== Name Changes ==
- 1910–1932: MÁV Gépgyári Sport Kör
- 1932–1951: MÁVAG Sport Kör
- 1951–1956: Vasas MÁVAG Sport Kör
- 1956–1959: Budapesti MÁVAG
- 1959: merger with Vasas Ganzvagon

== Seasons ==
The table below shows the seasons of Budapesti MÁVAG.

| Season | Tier | Club's name | Position | Pts |
|---|---|---|---|---|
| 1910–11 | 4 | MÁV Gépgyári SK | 2 / 7 | 17 |
| 1911–12 | 3 | MÁV Gépgyári SK | 9 / 12 | 16 |
| 1912–13 | 3 | MÁV Gépgyári SK | 3 / 12 | 31 |
| 1913–14 | 3 | MÁV Gépgyári SK | 1 / 13 | 45 |
| 1914 | 1 | MÁV Gépgyári SK | 5 / 12 | 14 |
| 1915 | 2 | MÁV Gépgyári SK | 3 / 5 | |
| 1915 | 1 | MÁV Gépgyári SK | 14 / 14 | 3 |
| 1916 | 2 | MÁV Gépgyári SK | 3 / 6 | 2 |
| 1916–17 | 2 | MÁV Gépgyári SK | 1 / 12 | 35 |
| 1917–18 | 1 | MÁV Gépgyári SK | 10 / 12 | 13 |
| 1918–19 | 1 | MÁV Gépgyári SK | 12 / 12 | 9 |
| 1919–20 | 2 | MÁV Gépgyári SK | 6 / 16 | 32 |
| 1920–21 | 2 | MÁV Gépgyári SK | 11 / 14 | 19 |
| 1921–22 | 3 | MÁV Gépgyári SK | 6 / 15 | 35 |
| 1922–23 | 3 | MÁV Gépgyári SK | 9 / 15 | 24 |
| 1923–24 | 3 | MÁV Gépgyári SK | 4 / 15 | 37 |
| 1924–25 | 3 | MÁV Gépgyári SK | 3 / 14 | 38 |
| 1925–26 | 2 | MÁV Gépgyári SK | 6 / 14 | 26 |
| 1926–27 | 2 | MÁV Gépgyári SK | 5 / 16 | 36 |
| 1927–28 | 2 | MÁV Gépgyári SK | 8 / 14 | 25 |
| 1928–29 | 2 | MÁV Gépgyári SK | 10 / 10 | 6 |
| 1929–30 | 3 | MÁV Gépgyár SK | 2 / 15 | 42 |
| 1930–31 | 3 | MÁV Gépgyár SK | 1 / 14 | 44 |
| 1931–32 | 2 | MÁV Gépgyár SK | 6 / 14 | 27 |
| 1932–33 | 2 | MÁVAG SK | 7 / 15 | 31 |
| 1933–34 | 2 | MÁVAG | 4 / 12 | 24 |
| 1934–35 | 2 | MÁVAG | 5 / 12 | 20 |
| 1935–36 | 2 | MÁVAG | 6 / 13 | 27 |
| 1936–37 | 2 | MÁVAG | 3 / 12 | 29 |
| 1937–38 | 2 | MÁVAG SK | 1 / 14 | 36 |
| 1938–39 | 2 | MÁVAG | 10 / 14 | 20 |
| 1939–40 | 2 | MÁVAG SK | 2 / 12 | 33 |
| 1940–41 | 2 | MÁVAG SK | 2 / 14 | 40 |
| 1941–42 | 1 | MÁVAG SK | 16 / 16 | 13 |
| 1942–43 | 2 | MÁVAG | 4 / 12 | 23 |
| 1943–44 | 2 | MÁVAG SK | 1 / 16 | 44 |
| 1944–45 | 1 | MÁVAG SK | 6 / 12 | 11 |
| 1944–45 | 1 | MÁVAG SK | 14 / 16 | 2 |
| 1945 | 1 | Budapesti MÁVAG | 10 / 12 | 9 |
| 1945–46 | 2 | MÁVAG SK | 5 / 14 | 30 |
| 1946–47 | 3 | MÁVAG SK | 4 / 14 | 34 |
| 1947–48 | 3 | MÁVAG SK | 1 / 16 | 50 |
| 1948–49 | 2 | MÁVAG SK | 8 / 16 | 29 |
| 1949–50 | 2 | MÁVAG | 12 / 16 | 23 |
| 1950 | 2 | MÁVAG | 11 / 16 | 12 |
| 1951 | 2 | Vasas MÁVAG | 14 / 14 | 16 |
| 1952 | 2 | Vasas MÁVAG | 8 / 18 | 33 |
| 1953 | 2 | Vasas MÁVAG | 14 / 16 | 23 |
| 1954 | 2 | Vasas-MÁVAG | 11 / 16 | 23 |
| 1955 | 3 | MÁVAG | 7 / 16 | 30 |
| 1956 | 3 | Vasas MÁVAG | 1 / 14 | 42 |
| 1957 | 2 | MÁVAG SK | 6 / 6 | 6 |
| 1957–58 | 2 | MÁVAG SK | 17 / 19 | 25 |
| 1958–59 | 3 | MÁVAG SK | 4 / 16 | 38 |
