= Soroksár FC =

Hungarian football club

- Full name: Soroksár Futball Club
- Founded: 1911
- Dissolved: 2003
Home colours

Soroksár Futball Club was a Hungarian football club from the town of Pesterzsébet.

== History ==
Soroksár Futball Club debuted in the 1932–33 season of the Hungarian League and finished twelfth.

== Name Changes ==
- 1911–1913: Soroksári Athletikai Club
- 1913: dissolved
- 1919: reestablished
- 1919–1920: Soroksári Munkások Testgyakorló Köre
- 1920–1926: Soroksári Atlétikai Club
- 1926–1935: Soroksár FC
- 1935: merger with Erzsébeti TC
- 1935–1936: Erzsébet-Soroksár FC
- 1937–1945: Soroksári AC
- 1945: Soroksári MADISZ
- 1945: merger with Erzsébeti MADISZ
- 1945–1948: ErSo MaDISz
- 1948: merger with Soroksári Textil
- 1948–1949: Soroksári Egység SE
- 1949–1950: Soroksári Textil SK
- 1950–1957: Soroksári Textiles Vörös Lobogó
- 1957–?: Soroksári AC

== Honours ==
=== Domestic ===
- Nemzeti Bajnokság II
  - Winners (4): 1931–32, 1933–34, 1947–48, 1950
- Hungarian Cup:
  - Winners (1): 1933–34
