= Vívó és Atlétikai Club =

Hungarian football club

- Full name: Vívó és Atlétikai Club
- Short name: VAC
- Founded: 1906
- Dissolved: 1957
- Ground: Postás Pálya
Home colours	Away colours

Vívó és Atlétikai Club was a Hungarian football club from Budapest.

== History ==
Vívó és Atlétikai Club debuted in the 1921–22 season of the Hungarian League and finished third.

== Name Changes ==
- 1906–1916: Vívó és Athletikai Club
- 1916: dissolved
- 1917: reestablished
- 1917–1926: Vívó és Atlétikai Club
- 1926–1927: Városi AC
- 1926–1927: merger with III. Kerületi TVE
- 1927–1938: VAC FC
- 1938–1941: Vívó és Athletikai Club
- 1941: dissolved
- 1945: reestablished
- 1945: Barátság Vívó és Atlétikai Club
- 1945–1949: Vívó és Atlétikai Club
- 1949: dissolved
- 1957: reestablished
- 1957: Vívó és Atlétikai Club

== Honours ==
- Nemzeti Bajnokság II:
  - Winners (1): 1920–21

== Seasons ==
The table below shows the seasons of Vívó és Atlétikai Club.

Season	Tier	Club's name	Position	Pts
1908–09	3	Vívó AC	4 / 10	23
1909–10	3	Vívó AC	2 / 10	30
1910–11	2	Vívó AC	7 / 10	13
1911–12	2	Vívó AC	12 / 12	9
1912–13	3	Vívó AC	8 / 12	17
1913–14	3	Vívó AC	9 / 13	19
1915	2	Vívó AC	8 / 12	9
1915	2	Vívó AC	9 / 12	6
1916	2	Vívó AC	4 / 8	6
1916–17	2	Vívó AC	0 / 12	-
1917–18	2	Vívó AC	7 / 12	18
1918–19	2	Vívó AC	5 / 12	20
1919–20	2	Vívó AC	3 / 17	45
1920–21	2	Vívó AC	1 / 14	39
1921–22	1	Vívó AC	6 / 12	20
1922–23	1	Vívó AC	6 / 12	21
1923–24	1	Vívó AC	5 / 12	19
1924–25	1	Vívó AC	7 / 12	22
1925–26	1	Vívó AC	12 / 12	17
1926–27	2	Városi AC	12 / 14	12
1927–28	2	VAC FC	10 / 12	9
1928–29	2	VAC FC	12 / 12	9
1929–30	2	VAC FC	3 / 13	35
1930–31	2	VAC FC	3 / 12	34
1931–32	2	VAC FC	5 / 11	23
1932–33	2	VAC FC	7 / 14	27
1933–34	2	VAC FC	6 / 14	27
1934–35	2	VAC FC	9 / 13	22
1935–36	2	VAC FC	4 / 14	32
1936–37	2	VAC FC	8 / 12	18
1937–38	2	VAC FC	12 / 14	15
1938–39	6	VAC	5 / 13	27
1939–40	5	VAC	6 / 11	18
1940–41	5	VAC	12 / 14	16
1945	2	Barátság VAC	10 / 12	2
1945–46	2	VAC	11 / 14	11
1946–47	3	VAC	11 / 14	17
1947–48	3	VAC	13 / 16	20
1948–49	3	Vívó és Atlétikai Club (VAC)	15 / 18	23
1949–50	4	Vívó és Atlétikai Club	16 / 16	-
