= 1955–58 Magyar Kupa =

Tournament details
- Country: Hungary

Final positions
- Champions: Ferencvárosi TC
- Runners-up: Salgótarjáni BTC

The 1955–58 Magyar Kupa (English: Hungarian Cup) was the 24th season of Hungary's annual knock-out cup football competition. The 1955 Magyar Kupa season was interrupted by the 1956 Hungarian uprising. Therefore, the final was held in 1958.

== Final ==
20 August 1958
17:00 (UTC+2)

Ferencvárosi TC	2–1	Salgótarjáni BTC
Friedmanszky 20', 59'	Report	Csáki 44' (pen.)

Népstadion, Budapest
Attendance: 10,000
Referee: Ferenc Virágh (Hungary)

== See also ==
- 1955 Nemzeti Bajnokság I
