= Kispesti Textil SE =

Hungarian football club

- Full name: Kispesti Textil Sport Egyesület
- Founded: 1929
- Ground: KISTEXT pálya
- Capacity: 1,000
Home colours

Kispesti Textil Sport Egyesület was a Hungarian football club from the town of Kispest, (from 1950 Budapest), Hungary.

== History ==
Kispesti Textil Sport Egyesület debuted in the 1948–49 season of the Hungarian League and finished ninth.

== Honours ==
=== League ===
- Nemzeti Bajnokság III:
  - Winners (2): 1943–44, 1960–61

== Name Changes ==
- 1929–1939: Kispesti Textilgyár
- 1939: merger with Kőbányai FC
- 1940–?: KISTEXT FC
- ?–1951: KISTEXT SE
- 1951–1956: Vörös Lobogó KISTEXT SK
- 1957–: KISTEXT SE

== Seasons ==
The table below shows the seasons of KISTEXT SK.

Season	Tier	Club's name	Position	Pts
1939–40	4	Kistex	12 / 13	14
1940–41	5	KISTEXT FC	1 / 14	43
1941–42	4	KISTEXT FC	2 / 13	35
1942–43	3	Kistext FC	5 / 14	32
1943–44	3	Kistext	1 / 15	41
1944–45	2	Kistext SE	6 / 16	11
1944–45	2	Kistext SE	0 / 12	
1945	2	Kistext SE	5 / 12	25
1945–46	2	Kistext SE	1 / 16	45
1946–47	2	Kistext SE	6 / 14	30
1947–48	2	Kistext SE	1 / 13	38
1948–49	1	KISTEXT SE	15 / 16	12
1949–50	2	Kistext SE	7 / 16	35
1950	2	Kistext SE	13 / 16	12
1951	3	Vörös Lobogó Kistext	1 / 12	41
1952	2	Vörös Lobogó Kistext	17 / 18	20
1953	3	Vörös Lobogó Kistext	1 / 16	53
1954	3	Vörös Lobogó Kistext	1 / 16	51
1955	2	Vörös Lobogó KISTEXT	6 / 16	32
1956	2	Kispesti Textiles	3 / 16	39
1957–58	2	KISTEXT SK	3 / 19	47
1958–59	2	KISTEXT SK	15 / 16	24
1959–60	3	KISTEXT SK	3 / 17	39
1960–61	3	KISTEXT SK	1 / 16	44
1961–62	2	KISTEXT SK	15 / 16	15
1962–63	3	KISTEXT SK	2 / 16	44
1963	3	KISTEXT SK	12 / 18	15
1964	3	KISTEXT SK	14 / 18	29
1965	3	KISTEXT SK	11 / 18	32
1966	3	KISTEXT SK	10 / 18	31
1967	3	KISTEXT SK	6 / 16	32
1968	3	KISTEXT SK	5 / 16	35
1969	3	KISTEXT SK	5 / 16	34
1970	3	KISTEXT SK	8 / 16	15
1970–71	3	KISTEXT SK	5 / 16	32
1971–72	3	KISTEXT SK	4 / 16	34
1972–73	3	KISTEXT SK	15 / 16	23
1973–74	4	KISTEXT SK	5 / 16	36
1974–75	4	KISTEXT SK	10 / 18	33
1975–76	4	KISTEXT SK	14 / 18	25
1976–77	4	KISTEXT SK	16 / 18	24
1977–78	5	KISTEXT SK	2 / 16	44
1978–79	3	KISTEXT SK	14 / 20	35
1979–80	3	KISTEXT SK	19 / 20	26
1980–81	4	KISTEXT SK	4 / 16	41
1981–82	5	KISTEXT SK	4 / 16	39
1982–83	5	KISTEXT SK	9 / 16	29
1983–84	5	KISTEXT SK	13 / 16	23
1984–85	5	KISTEXT SK	7 / 16	29
1985–86	5	KISTEXT SK	16 / 16	9
