= Zuglói AC =

Hungarian football club

Budapesti Gyárépítők SE
- Full name: Budapesti Gyárépítők Sport Egyesülete
- Founded: 1911
- Dissolved: 1950
Home colours

Budapesti Gyárépítők SE was a Hungarian association football club from Budapest. The club was founded as Zuglói Athletikai Club in 1911. In 1950 the club merged to Budafoki MTE.

== History ==
Zuglói Athletikai Club debuted in the 1922–23 season of the Hungarian League and finished ninth. In 1923 the club merged with the Zuglói VII. Kerületi SC and changed its name to Zuglói VII. Kerületi AC. In the next season the club was the sixth. In the 1924–25 season the club finished the penultimate 11th place and dropped to the II league.

== Name Changes ==
- 1911: Zuglói Athletikai Club
- 1911: merger with Zuglói Testvériség Sport Club
- 1911–1915: Zuglói Sport Club
- 1915: merger with Turul Sport Egyesület
- 1915–1919: Zuglói Turul Sport Club
- 1919–1920: Zuglói Munkás Testedző Egyesület
- 1920–1923: Zuglói Atlétikai Club
- 1923: merger with Zuglói VII. Kerületi SC
- 1923–1926: Zuglói VII. Kerületi AC
- 1926: foundation of a mutual club with Fővárosi TK
- 1926–1932: Turul FC
- 1932–1949: Zuglói Atlétikai Club
- 1949: Budapesti Gyárépítő
- 1949–1950: Budapesti Gyárépítők SE
- 1950: merger with Budafoki MTE

== Seasons ==
The table below shows the seasons of Zuglói AC.

Season	Tier	Club's name	Position	Pts
1911–12	4	Zuglói SC	5 / 12	26
1912–13	4	Zuglói SC	10 / 12	14
1913–14	3	Zuglói SC	5 / 13	31
1914	2	Zuglói SC	3 / 8	10
1915	2	Zuglói Turul SC	9 / 12	8
1915	2	Zuglói SC	8 / 12	9
1916	2	Zuglói Turul SC	5 / 8	3
1916–17	2	Zuglói Turul SC	1 / 12	24
1917–18	2	Zuglói Turul SC	4 / 12	26
1918–19	2	Zuglói MTE	10 / 12	16
1919–20	2	Zuglói AC	11 / 17	30
1920–21	2	Zuglói AC	2 / 14	35
1921–22	2	Zuglói AC	2 / 15	38
1922–23	1	Zuglói AC	8 / 12	19
1923–24	1	Zuglói VII. Ker. AC	6 / 12	19
1924–25	1	Zuglói VII. kerületi AC	11 / 12	15
1925–26	2	Zuglói VII. kerületi AC	2 / 14	38
1926–27	2	Turul FC	4 / 14	34
1927–28	2	Turul FC	2 / 12	34
1928–29	2	Turul FC	5 / 12	27
1929–30	2	Turul FC	6 / 13	26
1930–31	2	Turul FC	4 / 12	32
1931–32	2	Turul FC	7 / 11	25
1932–33	4	Zuglói AC	5 / 16	36
1933–34	3	Zuglói AC	13 / 14	15
1934–35	4	Zuglói AC	2 / 13	37
1935–36	3	Zuglói AC	10 / 13	19
1936–37	3	Zuglói AC	14 / 14	7
1937–38	4	Zuglói AC	12 / 14	15
1938–39	5	Zuglói AC	9 / 14	24
1939–40	4	Zuglói AC	8 / 13	22
1940–41	5	Zuglói AC	9 / 14	21
1941–42	6	Zuglói AC	4 / 9	21
1942–43	5	Zuglói AC	10 / 14	18
1943–44	5	Zuglói AC	1 / 14	43
1944–45	3	Zuglói AC	5 / 14	4
1945	2	Zuglói AC	5 / 12	25
1945–46	2	Zuglói AC	11 / 14	15
1946–47	3	Zuglói AC	12 / 14	15
1947–48	3	Zuglói AC	15 / 16	19
1948–49	4	Zuglói AC	11 / 15	22
1949–50	4	Budapesti Gyárépítők SE	12 / 16	23

== Managers ==
- (Hungary) Gábor Obitz (1945–?)
