= Terézvárosi TC =

Hungarian football club

- Full name: Terézvárosi Torna Club
- Founded: 1902
- Dissolved: 1953
- Ground: Hajtsár út
- Capacity: 3,000
Home colours	Away colours

Terézvárosi Torna Club was a Hungarian football club from the town of Terézváros, Budapest. Terézvárosi TC was founded as Fővárosi TC in 1902.

== History ==
Terézvárosi TC debuted as Fővárosi TC in the 1904 season of the Hungarian League and finished ninth.

== Name Changes ==
- 1902–1909: Fővárosi Torna Club
- 1909–1926: Terézvárosi Torna Club
- 1914: merger with Globus Terézvárosi SC
- 1921: merger with VIII. kerületi SC
- 1922: merger with Jutagyári TE
- 1926–1932: Terézvárosi FC
- 1931: merger with Józsefváros FC
- 1932: dissolved and merger with Nemzeti SC as VII. ker. Nemzeti Sportkedvelők Köre
- 1945: re-founded
- 1945-1945: VI. ker. Barátság
- 1945–1949: Terézvárosi Torna Club
- 1949–1951: Szerszámgépgyár
- 1951–?: Vasas Szerszámgépgyár

== Honours ==
- Nemzeti Bajnokság II:
  - Winners (2): 1903, 1917–18

== Seasons ==
The table below shows the seasons of Terézvárosi TC.

Season	Tier	Club's name	Position	Pts
1903	2	Fővárosi TC	1 / 6	17
1904	1	Fővárosi TC	9 / 9	4
1905	1	Fővárosi TC	6 / 9	12
1906	1	Fővárosi TC	9 / 9	0
1906–07	1	Fővárosi TC	7 / 8	7
1907–08	1	Fővárosi TC	7 / 9	10
1908–09	1	Fővárosi TC	5 / 9	18
1909–10	1	Terézvárosi TC	6 / 9	14
1910–11	1	Terézvárosi TC	7 / 10	13
1911–12	1	Terézvárosi TC	5 / 10	17
1912–13	1	Terézvárosi TC	10 / 10	4
1913–14	2	Terézvárosi TC	2 / 10	31
1914	1	Terézvárosi TC	12 / 12	3
1915	1	Terézvárosi TC	12 / 14	8
1916–17	2	Terézvárosi TC	6 / 12	19
1917–18	2	Terézvárosi TC	1 / 12	32
1918–19	1	Terézvárosi TC	4 / 12	23
1919–20	1	Terézvárosi TC	11 / 15	23
1920–21	1	Terézvárosi TC	9 / 15	20
1921–22	1	Terézvárosi TC	11 / 12	13
1922–23	2	Terézvárosi TC	10 / 15	24
1923–24	2	Terézvárosi TC	3 / 14	39
1924–25	2	Terézvárosi TC	13 / 14	38
1925–26	-	-	-	-
1926–27	2	Terézváros FC	14 / 14	11
1927–28	2	Terézváros FC	11 / 12	8
1928–29	2	Terézváros FC	11 / 12	10
1929–30	2	Terézváros FC	11 / 13	15
1930–31	2	Terézváros FC	8 / 12	14
1931–32	2	Terézváros FC	6 / 11	10
1945	2	VI. ker. Barátság	6 / 12	23
1945–46	2	Terézvárosi TC	10 / 14	18
1946–47	3	Terézvárosi TC	3 / 15	41
1947–48	3	Terézvárosi TC	16 / 16	3
1948–49	4	Terézvárosi TC	13 / 15	12
1949–50	4	Szerszámgépgyár	3 / 16	45
1950	4	Szerszámgépgyár	14 / 16	8
1951	4	Vasas Szerszámgépgyár	1 / 12	
1952	3	Vasas Szerszámgépgyár	12 / 14	19
1953	3	Vasas Szerszámgépgyár	16 / 16	-
