= Erzsébeti TC =

Hungarian football club

- Full name: Erzsébeti Torna Club
- Founded: 1907
- Dissolved: 1973
Home colours

Erzsébeti Torna Club was a Hungarian football club from the town of Pesterzsébet, Budapest.

== History ==
Erzsébeti Torna Club debuted in the 1925–26 season of the Hungarian League and finished ninth.

== Name Changes ==
- 1907–1924: Erzsébetfalvi Torna Club
- 1924: Erzsébetfalva becomes a city as Pesterzsébet
- 1924–1926: Erzsébeti Torna Club
- 1926–1927:Pesterzsébet Labdarúgó Szövetség
- 1927–1928: Pesterzsébet Futball Szövetkezet
- 1928: merger with Húsos FC
- 1929–1931: Erzsébeti Torna Club
- 1931–1935: Erzsébeti TC FC
- 1935: merger with Soroksár FC
- 1935–1938: Erzsébet FC
- 1938: takeover by Lampart FC
- 1938–1944: Erzsébeti Torna Club
- 1945-1945: Erzsébeti MaDISz
- 1945: merger with Soroksári MaDISz
- 1945: merger with Erzsébeti Barátság
- 1945–1947: Erzsébeti Barátság
- 1947–1949: Erzsébeti TC
- 1949-1949: Egyenruházati KTSz
- 1949–1951: Egyenruházati NV SE
- 1949: merger with Pesterzsébet-Soroksárújfalu
- 1951–1952: Vörös Meteor Füszért SK
- 1952: football department dissolved and merger with XX. ker. Petőfi
- 1952–1955: XX. ker. Petőfi
- 1955–1957: XX. ker. Bástya
- 1957–?: Erzsébeti TC
- ?-1960: Pesterzsébeti Petőfi SC
- 1960–1973: Erzsébeti Spartacus
- 1973: merger with Erzsébeti Spartacus MTK LE

== Honours ==
=== League ===
- Nemzeti Bajnokság II:
  - Winners (1): 1919–20
