= Törekvés SE =

Hungarian football club

- Full name: Törekvés Sportegyesület
- Founded: 1900
- Ground: Bihari úti Sportpálya
Home colours	Away colours

Törekvés Sportegyesület is a Hungarian football club from the town of Kőbánya, Budapest.

== History ==
Törekvés debuted in the 1903 season of the Hungarian League and finished last.

== Honours ==
- Nemzeti Bajnokság II:
  - Winners (3): 1906–07, 1938–39, 1941–42

== Name changes ==
- 1900–1951: Törekvés SC
- 1951–1955: Kőbányai Lokomotív
- 1955–1957: Kőbányai Törekvés
- 1957–1958: Haladás
- 1958–1995: Törekvés SE
- 1995–2000: Törekvés Szent István SE
- 2000–2001: Törekvés KISE
- 2001–2002: Grund R. Törekvés
