= List of winners of Nemzeti Bajnokság II =

A national second tier of Hungarian league football was established in 1901, as Nemzeti Bajnokság II. The current champions are Kisvárda FC by winning the last edition of the championship.

== Nemzeti Bajnokság II (1901-present) ==
#	Year	Group	Champions	Runners-up	Third place	Ref.
1.	1901	one group	33 FC	Rákosszentmihályi STE	Újpesti TE	
2.	1902	one group	Postások SE	MTK	Törekvés SE	
3.	1903	one group	Fővárosi TC	Újpesti TE	Budapesti SC	
4.	1904	one group	Újpesti TE	III. Kerületi TVE	Budapesti AK	
5.	1905	one group	Budapesti AK	Typographia SC	Tisztviselők SE	
6.	1906	one group	Tisztviselők SE	Törekvés SE	Magyar ÚE	
7.	1906–07	one group	Törekvés SE	Újpest-Rákospalotai AK	Tisztviselők LE	
8.	1907–08	one group	33 FC	Nemzeti SC	Újpest-Rákospalotai AK	
9.	1908–09	one group	Nemzeti SC	33 FC	Postások SE	
10.	1909–10	one group	33 FC	Újpest-Rákospalotai AK	Postások SE	
11.	1910–11	one group	III. Kerületi TVE	Újpest-Rákospalotai AK	Kereskedők AOE	
12.	1911–12	one group	Újpesti TE	Újpest-Rákospalotai AK	Fővárosi TK	
13.	1912–13	one group	III. Kerületi TVE	Erzsébetfalvi TC	Kereskedők AOE	
14.	1913–14	one group	Műegyetemi AFC	Terézvárosi TC	Fővárosi TK	
15.	1914	A	Fővárosi TK	Óbudai TE	Zuglói SC	
15.	1914	B	-	-	-	
15.	1914	C	Újpest-Rákospalotai AK	Újpesti LI	Palotai TK	
16.	1915	autumn	Vas- és Fémmunkások SC	Újpest-Rákospalotai AK	Festőmunkások LE	
17.	1916–17	one group	MÁV Gépgyári SK	Nemzeti SC	Testvériség SE	
18.	1917–18	one group	Terézvárosi TC	Testvériség SE	Nemzeti SC	
19.	1918–19	one group	Testvériség SE	Nemzeti SC	Nyomdászok TE	
20.	1919–20	Kárpáti	Erzsébetfalvi TC	Budapesti Egyetemi AC	Kereskedők AOE	
20.	1919–20	Stobbe	VII. Kerületi SC	Testvériség SE	Vívó és Atlétikai Club	
21.	1920–21	Kárpáti	Budapest SE	Nemzeti SC	Kereskedők AOE	
21.	1920–21	Stobbe	Vívó és Atlétikai Club	Zuglói AC	Újpesti Törekvés SE	
22.	1921–22	one group	Műegyetemi AFC	Zuglói AC	Budapesti AK	
23.	1922–23		Újpesti Törekvés SE	33 FC	Budapesti Egyetemi AC	
24.	1923–24		Budapesti Egyetemi AC	Nemzeti SC	Terézvárosi TC	
25.	1924–25		33 FC	Erzsébeti TC	Erzsébeti MTK	
26.	1925–26		Fővárosi TK	Zuglói AC	Újpesti Törekvés SE	
27.	1926–27		Miskolci AK	Bocskai FC	Budapesti AK	
28.	1927–28		Somogy FC	Turul FC	Pesterzsébet FSz	
29.	1928–29		Pécs-Baranya FC	Miskolci AK	Rákospalotai FC	
30.	1929–30		Sabaria FC	Vasas	Vívó és Atlétikai Club	
31.	1930–31		Somogy FC	Miskolci AK	Vívó és Atlétikai Club	
32.	1931–32		Soroksári FC	Szeged FC	Vívó és Atlétikai Club	
33.	1932–33		Phöbus FC	Vasas FC	Szürketaxi FC	
34.	1933–34		Soroksár FC	Erzsébeti TC FC	Szürketaxi FC	
35.	1934–35		Budafok FC	Nemzeti FC	Szürketaxi FC	
36.	1935–36		Nemzeti SC	Somogy-Baranya FC	Csepel FC	
37.	1936–37		Szürketaxi FC	Csepel FC	Alba-Regia AK	
38.	1937–38	Budapest	Zuglói SE	Újpest TE II	Postás SE	
38.	1937–38		Szolnoki MÁV FC	Csepel FC	Erzsébet FC	
39.	1938–39	West	Szombathely	Lampart FC	Soproni FAC	
39.	1938–39	East	Törekvés SE	Wesz Manfréd FC	Diósgyőri MÁVAG	
40.	1939–40	Dunántúl	Tokodi ÜSC	Soproni FAC	Lampart FC	
40.	1939–40	Alföld	Weisz Manfréd FC	MÁVAG SK	Újpesti TE II	
40.	1939–40	Felvidék	Salgótarjáni BTC	Diósgyőri MÁVAG	BSzKRT	
41.	1940–41	Duna	Szegedi VSE	Pécsi DVAC	Zuglói Danuvia SE	
41.	1940–41	Tisza	Lampart FC	MÁVAG SK	Debreceni VSC	
41.	1940–41	Kolozsvár	Nagyváradi AC	Nagybányai SE	Kolozsvári AC	
41.	1940–41	Székelyföld (north)	Marosvásárhelyi SE	Marosvásárhelyi PMTE	Székelykeresztúri AC	
41.	1940–41	Székelyföld (south)	Sepsiszentgyörgyi Textil	Gyergyószentmiklósi SE	Kézdivásárhelyi SE	
42.	1941–42	Zrínyi	Szombathelyi Haladás VSE	Szombathelyi FC	Soproni VSE	
42.	1941–42	Rákóczi	Vasas SC	BSzKRT SE	Budapesti VSC	
42.	1941–42	Mátyás	Törekvés SE	Debreceni VSC	Kolozsvári MÁV	
43.	1942–43	Széchenyi	Győri ETO	Szombathelyi FC	Érsekújvári SE	
43.	1942–43	Zrínyi	Szegedi VSE	Kaposvári Rákóczi AC	Kábelgyár SC	
43.	1942–43	Wesselényi	BSzKRT	Zuglói Danuvia	Ganz TE	
43.	1942–43	Rákóczi	Budapesti VSC	Ungvári AC	Kassai RAC	
43.	1942–43	Mátyás	Debreceni VSC	Nagybányai SE	Kolozsvári MÁV	
44.	1943–44	West	MÁVAG SK	Győri ETO	Szombathelyi Haladás VSE	
44.	1943–44	North	Ungvári AC	Salgótarjáni SE	Losonci AFC	
44.	1943–44	East	Szentlőrinci AC	Nagybányai SE	Törekvés SE	
44.	1943–44	South	Szegedi AK	Ganz TE	Zuglói Danuvia SE	
45.	1944–45	16 groups	suspended due to World War II			
46.	1945	Békéscsaba	Békéscsabai Törekvés	Csabai AK	Békéscsabai MÁV	
46.	1945	Budapest	Elektromos MTE	MÁV Előre	Budapesti VSC	
46.	1945	Debrecen	Debreceni VSC (promoted but did not win)			
46.	1945	Győr	Soproni VSE	Soproni FAC	Kapuvári SE	
46.	1945	Középmagyar	Dorogi AC	Esztergomi MTE	Pilisszentiváni MTE	
46.	1945	Miskolc	Diósgyőri VTK	Perecesi TK	Miskolci VSC	
46.	1945	Pécs	Pécsi Vasutas SK	Pécsi Bányász SC	Pécsi BTC	
46.	1945	Szeged	Kecskeméti TE	Kiskunfélegyházi Remény VSE	Csongrádi TK	
46.	1945	Szeged (town)	Szeged AK	Tisza Vasutas SE	Makói Vasutas SE	
47.	1946–47	West	MOGÜRT SC	Pécsi DVAC	Kaposvári MTE	
47.	1946–47	Central	Erzsébeti MTK	Salgótarjáni BTC	Salgótarjáni SE	
47.	1946–47	East	MATEOSz Munkás SE	Diósgyőr	Ózd	
47.	1946–47	South	Elektromos Munkás	Békéscsaba	Wolfner SE	
48.	1947–48	West	Tatabánya	Dorog	MÁV-Dunántúli AC	
48.	1947–48	Central	Er-So MaDISz	Újpesti MTE	Ganz TE	
48.	1947–48	East	Kistext SE	Perecesi TK	Wolfner SE	
48.	1947–48	South	Goldberger SE	Magyar Textil SE	Előre SE	
49.	1948–49	West	Nagykanizsai MAORT	Budapesti Lokomotív	Pécsi BTC	
49.	1948–49	Central	Dorogi AC	Budafoki MTE	Gázgyár	
49.	1948–49	East	Debreceni Lokomotív	Ózdi VTK	Pereces	
49.	1948–49	South	Előre SE	Szolnoki Lokomotív	MéMOSz	
50.	1949–50	West	Tatabányai Tárna	Pécsi BTC	Pápai Perutz SC	
50.	1949–50	Central	Bőripari Dolgozók	Budafoki MTE	Pesterzsébeti Vasas	
50.	1949–50	East	Diósgyőri Vasas	Kerámia SE	Ózdi Vasas	
50.	1949–50	South	Szegedi Szakszervezeti	Szolnoki Lokomotív	Budapesti Lokomotív	
51.	1950	West	Tatabányai Építők SK	Pécsi MESzHART	Pápai Textil	
51.	1950	Central	Soroksári Textil	Építők KSE	Magyar Pamut SC	
51.	1950	East	Sajószentpéteri Tárna	Csillaghegyi Textil	Pereces	
51.	1950	South	Szegedi Honvéd SE	Szolnoki Lokomotív	Budapesti Lokomotív	
52.	1951	West	Pécsi Lokomotív	Tatabánya	Csillaghegyi MTE	
52.	1951	Central	Budapesti Gyárépítők	Váci Vörös Lobogó	Budapesti Építők	
52.	1951	East	Budapesti Postás	Ózdi Vasas	Miskolci Honvéd SE	
52.	1951	South	Vörös Lobogó Keltex	Budapesti Előre	Budapesti Szikra	
53.	1952	West	Vörös Lobogó Sor Tex	Tatabánya	Pápai Vörös Lobogó	
53.	1952	Central	Sztálin Vasmű Építők	Szikra Gázművek	Csillaghegyi MTE	
53.	1952	East	Miskolci Honvéd SE	Ózdi Vasas	Budapesti Lokomotív	
53.	1952	South	Vasas Izzó	Szegedi Petőfi	Békéscsabai Építők	
54.	1953	West	Pécsi Lokomotív	Komló	Pápai Vörös Lobogó	
54.	1953	Central	Szikra Gázművek	Tatabánya	Pesterzsébeti Vasas	
54.	1953	East	Diósgyőri Vasas	Miskolci Honvéd SE	Ózdi Vasas	
54.	1953	South	Vasas Izzó	Légierő	Budapesti Előre	
55.	1954	West	Kőbányai Dózsa	Pécsi Lokomotív	Pécsi Bányász SC	
55.	1954	Central	Budapesti Vörös Meteor	Tatabányai Bányász	Budapesti Gyárépítők SK	
55.	1954	East	Ózdi Vasas	Nyíregyházi Építők	Gödöllői Dózsa SC	
55.	1954	South	Légierő	Békéscsabai Építők	Budapesti Szikra	
56.	1955	West	Tatabánya	Budapesti Spartacus	Dunaújváros	
56.	1955	East	Szegedi Haladás SK	Budapesti Törekvés SE	Vörös Meteor	
57.	1956	West	Komló	Győr	Dunapentele	
57.	1956	East	Diósgyőr	Budapesti VSC	Kispesti Textil	
58.	1957	I.	Székesfehérvári Vasas	Veszprém	Mosonmagyaróvár	
58.	1957	II.	Nyíregyházi Építők	Miskolci MTE	Bükkaljai Bányász	
58.	1957	III.	Szegedi VSE	Makó	Cegléd	
58.	1957	IV.	Oroszlányi Bányász SK	Jászberényi Vasas	Délbudai Spartacus	
59.	1957–58	West	Győri Vasas ETO	Sztálinvárosi Vasas	Láng-gépgyár SK	
59.	1957–58	South	Budapesti VSC	Újpesti Tungsram TE	Kispesti Textil	
59.	1957–58	East	Miskolc	Debreceni VSC	Budapesti Spartacus	
60.	1958–59	West	Pécs	Komló	Zalaegerszeg	
60.	1958–59	East	Szegedi EAC	Debrecen	Borsodi Bányász SE	
61.	1959–60	West	Győr	FŐSPED Szállítók SE	Komló	
61.	1959–60	East	Debrecen	Kecskemét	Szegedi VSE	
62.	1960–61	West	Komló	Szombathely	FŐSPED Szállítók SE	
62.	1960–61	East	Ózd	Szolnok	Ganz-MÁVAG	
63.	1961–62	West	Szombathely	Budapesti VSC	Székesfehérvár	
63.	1961–62	East	Debrecen	Láng Vasas	Budapesti Előre	
64.	1962–63	West	Csepel	Székesfehérvár	Dunaújváros	
64.	1962–63	East	Diósgyőr	Ózd	Miskolc	
65.	1963	one group	VM Egyetértés	Oroszlányi Bányász SK	Győri MÁV	
66.	1964	one group	Salgótarján	Ózd	Oroszlányi Bányász SK	
67.	1965	one group	Dunaújváros	Diósgyőr	Szombathely	
68.	1966	one group	Szegedi EAC	Eger	Komló	
69.	1967	one group	Egyetértés	Videoton	BVSC	
70.	1968	one group	Eger	Komló	Kecskemét	
71.	1969	one group	Videoton	Szegedi EOL	Zalaegerszeg	
72.	1970	West	Pécsi Bányász SC	Egyetértés	Oroszlányi Bányász SK	
72.	1970	East	FŐSPED Szállítók SE	Budapesti Spartacus	Kecskemét	
73.	1970–71	one group	Vörös Meteor	Eger	Oroszlányi Bányász SK	
74.	1971–72	one group	Szegedi EOL	Zalaegerszeg	Debrecen	
75.	1972–73	one group	Szombathely	Dorog	MÁV DAC	
76.	1973–74	one group	Diósgyőr	Békéscsaba	Komló	
77.	1974–75	one group	Szegedi EOL	Kaposvári Rákóczi SC	Volán SC	
78.	1975–76	one group	Dunaújváros	Dorog	Budafok	
79.	1976–77	one group	Pécsi MFC	Székesfehérvári MÁV	Budafok	
80.	1977–78	one group	Salgótarján	Budapesti Vasas Izzó	Debrecen	
81.	1978–79	West	Pécsi Vasutas SK	Komló	Kaposvár	
81.	1978–79	Central	Volán	Szegedi Dózsa SC	Budapesti VSC	
81.	1978–79	East	Debrecen	Nyíregyháza	Eger	
82.	1979–80	West	Kaposvár	Szombathely	Nagykanizsa	
82.	1979–80	Central	Csepel	Vasas Izzó	Szegedi EOL	
82.	1979–80	East	Nyíregyháza	Szolnok	Hódmezővásárhely	
83.	1980–81	West	Szombathely	Nagykanizsa	Keszthelyi Haladás SC	
83.	1980–81	Central	Szegedi EOL	Ganz-MÁVAG	Honvéd Bem József	
83.	1980–81	East	Ózd	Gyula	Hódmezővásárhely	
84.	1981–82	West	Nagykanizsai Olajbányász SE	Tapolcai Bauxitbányász SE	Szekszárdi Dózsa SC	
84.	1981–82	Central	MTK	22. sz Volán	Dorog	
84.	1981–82	East	Kazincbarcika	Eger	Hódmezővásárhely	
85.	1982–83	one group	Volán	Szegedi EOL	Salgótarján	
86.	1983–84	one group	Eger	Debrecen	Békéscsaba	
87.	1984–85	one group	Volán	Siófok	Vác	
88.	1985–86	one group	Dunaújváros	Eger	Szegedi EOL	
89.	1986–87	one group	Kaposvár	Vác	Volán	
90.	1987–88	one group	Veszprém	Dunaújváros	Szeged SC	
91.	1988–89	West	Csepel	Oroszlányi Bányász SK	Nagykanizsa	
91.	1988–89	East	Debrecen	Szeged SC	Szarvas	
92.	1989–90	West	Volán	Dunaferr	Oroszlányi Bányász SK	
92.	1989–90	East	Szeged SC	Kazincbarcika	Budapesti VSC	
93.	1990–91	West	Szombathely	Zalaegerszeg	Dunaferr	
93.	1990–91	East	Budapesti VSC	Diósgyőr	Csepel	
94.	1991–92	West	Csepel	BKV Előre	Dorog	
94.	1991–92	East	Békéscsaba	Nyíregyháza	Kaba	
95.	1992–93	West	Szombathely	Sopron	BKV Előre	
95.	1992–93	East	Debrecen	Hatvan	Tiszavasvári	
96.	1993–94	West	Nagykanizsai Olajbányász SE	Zalaegerszegi TE	Dunaferr SE	
96.	1993–94	East	Kiskörös-Stadler FC	FC Hatvan	III. Kerületi TVE	
97.	1994–95	West	Haladás VSE	BKV Előre SC	Siófoki Bányász FC	
97.	1994–95	East	MTK	Salgótarjáni BTC	Kazincbarcikai SC	
98.	1995–96	West	Siófoki Bányász FC	MATÁV SC Sopron	Rákóczi Kaposcukor FC	
98.	1995–96	East	III. Kerületi TVE	Tiszakécske FC	Diósgyőri FC	
99.	1996–97	West	Gázszer FC	Dunaferr SE	Érdi VSE	
99.	1996–97	East	Tiszakécske FC	Diósgyőri FC	Nyíregyházi FC	
100.	1997–98	one group	Nyíregyháza FC	Dunaferr SE	III. Kerületi TVE	
101.	1998–09	one group	Lombard FC Tatabánya	Nagykanizsai Olajbányász FC	Szeged LC	
102.	1999–00	one group	Videoton FC Fehérvár	MATÁV Sopron FC	BKV Előre SC	
103.	2000–01	West	Haladás	Százhalombatta	Pécsi Mecsek FC	
103.	2000–01	East	BKV Előre	Kecskeméti FC	Nyírség-Spartacus FC	
104.	2001–02	West	Siófok FC	Celldömölki VSE	Kaposvári Rákóczi	
104.	2001–02	East	Békéscsabai Előre FC	Diósgyőri VTK	Szolnoki MÁV FC	
105.	2002–03	one group	Pécsi Mecsek FC	Lombard FC Haladás	Büki TK	
106.	2003–04	one group	Budapest Honvéd	Vasas	Kaposvár	
107.	2004–05	one group	Tatabánya	Rákospalota	Vác	
108.	2005–06	West	Paks	Felcsút	Gyirmót	
108.	2005–06	East	Vác	Szolnok	Jászapáti	
109.	2006–07	West	Siófok	Szombathely	Felcsút	
109.	2006–07	East	Nyíregyháza	Ferencváros	Orosháza	
110.	2007–08	West	Szombathely	Felcsút	Gyirmót	
110.	2007–08	East	Kecskemét	Szolnok	Ferencváros	
111.	2008–09	West	Gyirmót	Pápa	Pécs	
111.	2008–09	East	Ferencváros	Debrecen II	Makó	
112.	2009–10	West	Siófok	Pápa	Pécs	
112.	2009–10	East	Szolnok	Debreceni EAC	Makó	
113.	2010–11	West	Pécs	Gyirmót	Puskás Akadémia	
113.	2010–11	East	Diósgyőr	Mezőkövesd	Nyíregyháza	
114.	2011–12	West	MTK	Kozármisleny	Gyirmót	
114.	2011–12	East	Eger	Szolnok	Békéscsaba	
115.	2012–13	West	Puskás Akadémia	Kozármisleny	Gyirmót	
115.	2012–13	East	Mezőkövesd	Vasas Budapest	Békéscsaba	
116.	2013–14	one group	Nyíregyháza	Dunaújváros	Gyirmót	
117.	2014–15	one group	Vasas	Békéscsaba	Gyirmót	
118.	2015–16	one group	Gyirmót	Mezőkövesd	Zalaegerszeg	
119.	2016–17	one group	Puskás Akadémia	Balmazújváros	Kisvárda	
120.	2017–18	one group	MTK	Kisvárda	Békéscsaba	
121.	2018–19	one group	Zalaegerszeg	Kaposvár	Gyirmót	
122.	2019–20	one group	MTK	Budafok	Vasas	
123.	2020–21	one group	Debrecen	Gyirmót	Vasas	
124.	2021–22	one group	Vasas	Kecskemét	Diósgyőr	
125.	2022–23	one group	Diósgyőr	MTK	Ajka	
126.	2023–24	one group	Nyíregyháza	Győr	Vasas	
127.	2024–25	one group	Kisvárda	Kazincbarcika	Vasas	

== See also ==
List of Hungarian football champions
List of winners of Nemzeti Bajnokság III
