= List of Győri ETO FC seasons =

Football Club in Hungary

Győri ETO FC is a professional association football club based in Győr, Hungary.

== Key ==
Nemzeti Bajnokság I

- Pld = Matches played
- W = Matches won
- D = Matches drawn
- L = Matches lost
- GF = Goals for
- GA = Goals against
- Pts = Points
- Pos = Final position

Hungarian football league system

- NBI = Nemzeti Bajnokság I
- NBII = Nemzeti Bajnokság II
- NBIII = Nemzeti Bajnokság III
- MBI = Megyei Bajnokság I

Magyar Kupa

- F = Final
- SF = Semi-finals
- QF = Quarter-finals
- R16 = Round of 16
- R32 = Round of 32
- R64 = Round of 64
- R128 = Round of 128

UEFA

- F = Final
- SF = Semi-finals
- QF = Quarter-finals
- Group = Group stage
- PO = Play-offs
- QR3 = Third qualifying round
- QR2 = Second qualifying round
- QR1 = First qualifying round
- PR = Preliminary round

Winners	Runners-up	Third	Promoted	Relegated

== Seasons ==
As of 13 August 2026.

Season	League										Cup	UEFA		Manager	Ref.
Season	Tier	Div	MP	W	D	L	GF	GA	Pts.	Pos.	Cup	Competition	Result	Manager	Ref.
1907–08	2	NBII	4	4	0	0	10	3	8	1st		Did not qualify			
1908–09	2	NBII	8	7	1	0	43	5	15	1st		Did not qualify			
1909–10	2	NBII	8	8	0	0	41	2	16	1st		Did not qualify			
1910–11	2	NBII	8	5	1	0	24	1	11	1st		Did not qualify			
1911–12	2	NBII	4	2	0	2	7	4	4	2nd		Did not qualify			
1912–13	2	NBII	8	8	0	0			16	1st		Did not qualify			
1913–14	2	NBII	12	10	0	2	?	?	20	2nd		Did not qualify			
1915	2	NBII										Did not qualify			
1916	2	NBII										Did not qualify			
1916–17	2	NBII										Did not qualify			
1917–18	2	NBII										Did not qualify			
1918–19	2	NBII	5	4	1	0	10	1	9	1st		Did not qualify			
1919–20	2	NBII										Did not qualify			
1920–21	2	NBII										Did not qualify			
1921–22	2	NBII										Did not qualify			
1922–23	2	NBII	16	6	3	7	24	27	15	6th		Did not qualify			
1923–24	2	NBII	18	11	3	4	36	28	25	2nd		Did not qualify			
1924–25	2	NBII	20	8	5	7	46	30	21	6th		Did not qualify			
1925–26	2	NBII	18	8	3	7	47	32	19	5th		Did not qualify			
1926–27	2	NBII	18	8	3	7	37	25	19	7th		Did not qualify			
1927–28	2	NBII	18	10	1	7	51	36	21	4th		Did not qualify			
1928–29	2	NBII	18	8	3	7	38	29	19	6th		Did not qualify			
1929–30	2	NBII	20	13	4	3	70	27	30	2nd		Did not qualify			
1930–31	2	NBII	20	14	4	2	66	34	32	2nd		Did not qualify			
1931–32	2	NBII	20	16	2	2	76	26	34	1st		Did not qualify			
1932–33	2	NBII	22	9	5	8	43	45	23	5th		Did not qualify			
1933–34	2	NBII	22	9	4	9	42	43	22	4th		Did not qualify			
1934–35	2	NBII	22	13	4	5	49	31	30	2nd		Did not qualify			
1935–36	2	NBII	26	12	6	8	66	44	30	5th		Did not qualify			
1936–37	2	NBII	24	16	5	3	63	29	37	1st		Did not qualify			
1937–38	1	NB I	26	3	5	18	24	83	11	13th		Did not qualify		(Hungary) Fogl II	
1938–39	2	NBII	26	11	5	10	47	51	27	6th		Did not qualify			
1939–40	2	NBII	26	13	3	21	60	46	29	4th		Did not qualify			
1940–41	2	NBII	26	12	2	12	32	52	26	8th		Did not qualify			
1941–42	2	NBII	26	12	2	7	108	39	36	4th		Did not qualify			
1942–43	2	NBII	26	16	3	3	81	29	35	1st		Did not qualify			
1943–44	2	NBII	30	18	7	5	88	41	43	2nd		Did not qualify			
1944–45	Suspended due to WWII											Did not qualify			
1945–46	1	NB I	18	9	2	7	32	27	20	14th		Did not qualify		(Hungary) Lóránt, (Hungary) Farkas	
1946–47	1	NB I	30	11	5	14	54	49	27	12th		Did not qualify		(Hungary) Remmer	
1947–48	1	NB I	32	11	2	19	47	62	24	9th		Did not qualify		(Hungary) Horváth	
1948–49	1	NB I	30	12	5	13	56	88	29	9th		Did not qualify		(Hungary) Baróti	
1949–50	1	NB I	30	13	7	10	63	45	33	7th		Did not qualify		(Hungary) Baróti	
1950	1	NB I	15	6	1	8	28	28	13	9th		Did not qualify		(Hungary) Baróti	
1951	1	NB I	26	9	8	9	47	43	26	7th		Did not qualify		(Hungary) Baróti	
1952	1	NB I	26	9	5	12	51	57	23	6th		Did not qualify		(Hungary) Baróti, (Hungary) Magyar, (Hungary) Kovács	
1953	1	NB I	26	8	10	8	41	46	26	6th		Did not qualify		(Hungary) Kovács	
1954	1	NB I	26	9	7	10	43	51	25	7th		Did not qualify		(Hungary) Kovács	
1955	1	NB I	26	7	7	12	44	57	21	11th		Did not qualify		(Hungary) Jeny	
1958–59	1	NB I	26	3	7	16	15	36	13	14th		Did not qualify		(Hungary) Kovács	
1959–60	2	NBII	30	24	3	3	69	14	51	1st		Did not qualify			
1960–61	1	NB I	26	9	7	10	43	31	25	8th		Did not qualify		(Hungary) Orczifalvi	
1961–62	1	NB I	26	6	10	10	30	44	22	10th		Did not qualify		(Hungary) Orczifalvi	
1962–63	1	NB I	26	12	5	9	42	37	29	6th		Did not qualify		(Hungary) Szusza	
1963	1	NB I	13	6	5	2	20	7	17	1st		Did not qualify		(Hungary) Hidegkuti	
1964	1	NB I	26	12	9	5	38	25	33	5th	R	European Cup	SF	(Hungary) Hidegkuti	
1965	1	NB I	26	12	9	8	41	30	30	5th	W	Did not qualify		(Hungary) Hidegkuti	
1966	1	NB I	26	11	9	6	38	29	31	5th	W	Cup Winners' Cup	QF	(Hungary) Szusza	
1967	1	NB I	30	14	11	5	68	37	39	3rd	W	Cup Winners' Cup	1R	(Hungary) Szusza	
1968	1	NB I	30	6	11	13	37	48	23	14th		Cup Winners' Cup	2R	(Hungary) Szusza	
1969	1	NB I	30	12	10	8	53	36	34	5th		Inter-Cities Fairs Cup	2R	(Hungary) Mészáros	
1970	1	NB I	14	3	1	10	9	23	7	16th		Did not qualify		(Hungary) Mészáros	
1970–71	1	NB I	30	13	6	11	37	34	33	9th		Did not qualify		(Hungary) Dombos	
1971–72	1	NB I	30	7	12	11	36	51	21	10th		Did not qualify		(Hungary) László Győrfi	
1972–73	1	NB I	30	14	2	14	46	51	30	8th		Did not qualify		(Hungary) Farsang	
1973–74	1	NB I	30	15	8	7	43	35	38	3rd		Did not qualify		(Hungary) Farsang	
1974–75	1	NB I	28	10	5	13	40	44	25	9th		UEFA Cup	2R	(Hungary) Farsang	
1975–76	1	NB I	30	7	11	12	36	49	25	11th		Did not qualify		(Hungary) Pálfy	
1976–77	1	NB I	34	15	5	14	54	46	35	7th		Did not qualify		(Hungary) Palicskó	
1977–78	1	NB I	34	6	13	15	37	52	25	15th		Did not qualify		(Hungary) Palicskó	
1978–79	1	NB I	34	12	11	11	40	33	35	6th	W	Did not qualify		(Hungary) Kovács	
1979–80	1	NB I	34	14	10	16	59	62	32	13th	W	Cup Winners' Cup	1R	(Hungary) Kovács	
1980–81	1	NB I	34	9	13	12	43	43	31	11th		Did not qualify		(Hungary) Kovács	
1981–82	1	NB I	34	21	7	6	102	50	49	1st		Did not qualify		(Hungary) Verebes	
1982–83	1	NB I	30	19	6	5	82	37	44	1st		European Cup	1R	(Hungary) Verebes	
1983–84	1	NB I	30	14	9	7	66	58	37	2nd	R	European Cup	2R	(Hungary) Verebes	
1984–85	1	NB I	30	15	6	9	57	49	36	2nd		UEFA Cup	1R	(Hungary) Verebes	
1985–86	1	NB I	30	13	11	6	60	43	37	3rd		UEFA Cup	1R	(Hungary) Verebes	
1986–87	1	NB I	30	9	11	10	51	45	29	10th		UEFA Cup	2R	(Hungary) Gellei, (Hungary) Győrfi	
1987–88	1	NB I	30	17	7	9	49	43	35	4th		Did not qualify		(Hungary) Győrfi	
1988–89	1	NB I	30	16	3	2	44	31	56	5th		Did not qualify		(Hungary) Haász	
1989–90	1	NB I	30	7	14	9	34	30	35	12th		Did not qualify		(Czechoslovakia) Pecze	
1990–91	1	NB I	30	8	10	12	35	41	26	11th		Did not qualify		(Hungary) Glázer	
1991–92	1	NB I	30	8	10	12	34	43	26	11th		Did not qualify		(Hungary) Glázer, (Hungary) Szentes	
1992–93	1	NB I	30	10	9	11	38	43	29	9th		Did not qualify		(Hungary) Tornyi	
1993–94	1	NB I	30	15	7	8	51	37	37	5th		Did not qualify		(Hungary) Verebes	
1994–95	1	NB I	30	11	5	14	42	40	35	11th		Did not qualify		(Hungary) Verebes, (Hungary) Győrfi	
1995–96	1	NB I	30	6	9	15	34	54	27	15th^{1}		Did not qualify		(Hungary) Póczik, (Hungary) Haász	
1996–97	1	NB I	34	10	12	12	44	51	42	9th		Did not qualify		(Hungary) Haász, (Hungary) Keglovich	
1997–98	1	NB I	34	18	9	7	47	31	63	4th		Did not qualify		(Hungary) Reszeli Soós	
1998–99	1	NB I	34	16	11	7	53	39	59	4th		Did not qualify		(Hungary) Reszeli Soós	
1999–00	1	NB I	32	12	8	12	52	36	44	8th		Did not qualify		(Hungary) Garami, (Hungary) Károly	
2000–01	1	NB I	22	11	5	6	34	32	40	5th		Did not qualify		(Hungary) Varga	
2001–02	1	NB I	38	10	14	14	51	64	44	10th		Did not qualify		(Hungary) Tamási	
2002–03	1	NBI	32	9	9	14	41	50	36	6th		Did not qualify		(Hungary) Csertői, (Hungary) Tamási	
2003–04	1	NB I	32	10	6	16	36	54	36	10th		Did not qualify		(Hungary) Varga, (Hungary) Kiprich, (Hungary) Reszeli Soós	
2004–05	1	NB I	30	16	6	8	44	32	54	5th		Did not qualify		(Hungary) Reszeli Soós	
2005–06	1	NB I	30	9	9	12	47	50	36	9th		Did not qualify		(Hungary) Reszeli Soós, (Hungary) Csank	
2006–07	1	NB I	30	9	8	13	37	43	35	13th		Did not qualify		(Hungary) Pajkos, (Hungary) Reszeli Soós, (Hungary) Klement	
2007–08	1	NB I	30	16	10	4	64	35	58	3rd		Did not qualify		(Hungary) Egervári	
2008–09	1	NB I	30	11	10	9	57	41	43	8th	R	UEFA Cup	2QR	(Hungary) Egervári, (Serbia) Bekvalac	
2009–10	1	NB I	30	15	12	3	38	18	57	3rd	R16	Europa League	PO	(Hungary) Pintér	
2010–11	1	NB I	30	10	11	9	40	35	41	8th	R16	Did not qualify		(Hungary) Pintér	
2011–12	1	NB I	30	20	3	7	56	31	63	3rd	QF	Suspended ^{2}		(Hungary) Csertői, (Hungary) Pintér	
2012–13	1	NB I	30	19	7	4	57	31	64	1st	R	Suspended ^{2}		(Hungary) Pintér	
2013–14	1	NB I	30	18	8	4	58	32	62	2nd	R16	Champions League	2QR	(Hungary) Pintér, (Hungary) Horváth	
2014–15	1	NB I ↓	30	10	8	12	41	44	38	8th ^{3}	?	Europa League	2QR	(Hungary) Horváth ^{4}, (Hungary) (Romania) Miriuță	
2015–16	3	NB III	32	16	9	7	60	33	57	4th	3R	Did not qualify		(Hungary) Preszeller	
2016–17	3	NB III ↑	32	27	0	5	84	22	81	1st	3R	Did not qualify		(Hungary) Bekő	
2017–18	2	NB II	38	17	7	14	55	53	58	7th	L16	Did not qualify		(Hungary) Szentes	
2018–19	2	NB II	38	17	7	4	60	46	58	8th	TBD	Did not qualify		(Hungary) Mészöly	
2019–20^{5}	2	NB II	27	11	8	8	36	32	41	6th	TBD	Did not qualify		(Hungary)	
2020–21	2	NB II	38	12	10	16	53	48	46	12th	R64	Did not qualify		(Hungary) Csató, (Hungary) Dobos	
2021–22	2	NB II	38	16	8	14	57	46	56	7th	SF	Did not qualify		(Hungary) Klausz	
2022–23	2	NB II	38	11	13	14	37	42	46	13th	R16	Did not qualify		(Hungary) Timár, (Spain) Muñoz	
2023–24	2	NB II ↑	38	22	3	9	65	37	69	2nd	R32	Did not qualify		(Spain) Muñoz, (Ukraine) Kuznetsov, (Slovakia) (Hungary) Borbély	
2024–25	1	NB I	33	14	11	8	49	37	53	4th	R16	Did not qualify		(Slovakia) (Hungary) Borbély	
2025–26	1	NB I	33	20	9	4	65	30	69	1st	SF	Conference League	PO	(Slovakia) (Hungary) Borbély	
2026–27	1	NB I	2	1	1	0	6	2	4	4th	R64	Champions League, Conference League	1QR, 3QR	(Mexico) Juárez	

Notes

- Note 1: Since the number of teams of the 1996–97 season of the Hungarian League were expanded by 2 more teams, Győr were not relegated directly even though they finished 15th in the 1995–96 season. Győr had to play relegation play-offs with FC Sopron. The first tie ended in 2–0 victory over Sopron, while the second leg was lost to 2–1.
- Note 2: Győr will finish in the top three of the 2011–12 Hungarian National Championship I, but they will not be eligible to enter either the 2012–13 UEFA Champions League or Europa League due to having been suspended from participating in UEFA competitions for the first season they qualify between the 2011–12 and 2013–14 seasons in relation to club licensing violations. As a result, the fourth-placed team of the league will take one of Hungary's Europa League places in the first qualifying round.
- Note 3: Relegated to the Nemzeti Bajnokság III due to financial reasons.
- Note 4: Zsolt Fórián as caretaker manager.
- Note 5: The season was suspended due to the COVID-19 pandemic.
