= Ferenc Braun =

Hungarian footballer

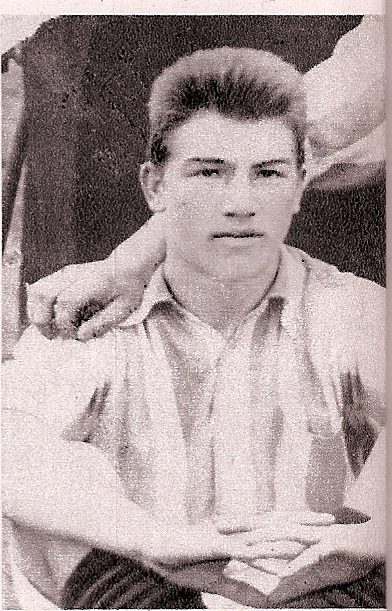
- Braun in 1903

Personal information
- Date of birth: 2 January 1885
- Place of birth: Budapest, Austria-Hungary
- Date of death: 29 September 1933 (aged 48)
- Place of death: Budapest, Kingdom of Hungary
- Position: Forward

Senior career*
Years	Team	Apps	(Gls)
1901–07	Ferencvárosi TC	74	(33)

International career
1903–07	Hungary	4	(0)
- * Club domestic league appearances and goals

Ferenc Braun (2 January 1885 – 29 September 1933) was a Hungarian footballer who played as a forward for Ferencvárosi TC and the Hungarian national team in the early 20th century.

== Early life and education ==
Ferenc Braun was born on 2 January 1885 in Budapest's 8th district, (Note: Some sources wrongly state that he was born on 2 July 1886.) as the son of Ferenc Braun, a stonemason, and Mária Goldschmidt. On 8 February 1914, he married Mária Schilberszky (1891–1962) in Budapest's 1st district.

== Sporting career ==
Braun began his football career in the youth ranks of his hometown club Ferencvárosi TC, where he quickly stood out from the rest due to already having a more advanced technique than most of his peers from the same age. Thus, on 21 April 1901, the 16-year-old Braun made his league debut for the first team in a 3–5 loss to MUE, and playing his last league match six years later, on 17 November 1907, in a 4–1 win over BAK. In total, he scored 32 goals in 74 league matches, helping his side win three Hungarian Championships in 1903, 1905, and 1906–07, and three consecutive Silver Ball tournaments between 1903 and 1905. He played mostly on the right wing, being noted for his fast runs down the line, at the end of which he often delivered precise passes or even threatened the goal himself.

On 5 April 1903, the 18-year-old Braun made his international debut in a friendly match against Bohemia at Budapest, helping his side to a 2–1 win. He went on to earn a further three international caps for Hungary between 1903 and 1907, all in friendlies and all against Austria, retiring from the international scene with a total of three wins and one loss.

His explosiveness on the wings caused not only the end of his career in 1907, aged only 22, but also the start of his career in athletics, specifically in the 400 meters, where he won many awards. Likewise, in 1908, he became the treasurer of the FTC's athletic department, eventually becoming its chairman in 1913. Despite retiring in 1907, Braun kept playing football sporadically, appearing in the Postatakarék football team during the summer of 1909, and in the FTC old-boys team in the autumn of 1911, despite being only 26. In early 1914, he was acting as a coach of MAC athletes, and like so many other athletes, he also served at the front during the First World War, where he was wounded several times. His younger brothers Rezső and Imre were also footballers for the FTC, with the latter dying in the War in 1915.

Once the War was over, Braun returned to the MAC, and after a short stint as a football and athletics coach at the Újpest FC in 1920, he returned to the MAC in 1921.

== Death ==
Braun died in Budapest on 29 September 1933, at the age of 48.

== Honours ==
Ferencvárosi TC

- Nemzeti Bajnokság I:
  - Champions (3): 1903, 1905, 1906–07
  - Runner-up (2): 1902, 1904
- Silver Ball
  - Champions (3): 1903, 1904, 1905
