= 1901 Nemzeti Bajnokság II =

Nemzeti Bajnokság II
- Season: 1901
- Country: Hungary
- Teams: 8
- Champions: 33 FC
- Runner up: Rákosszentmihályi STE
- Promoted: 33 FC

The 1901 Nemzeti Bajnokság II season was the first edition of the Nemzeti Bajnokság II. The following eight clubs were assigned to the II. class: "33" Football Club, Magyar Athletikai Club, Budapesti Egyetemi Athletikai Club, Budapesti Athletikai Klub, Rákosszentmihályi Sporttelep, Magyar Football Club, Újpesti Football Club, Ganz-Waggongyári Tisztviselők Labdarúgó Egylete.

Among the founding clubs, the Posta- és Távirda-Tisztviselők SE and the Budai Ganzgyár Football-csapata did not enter, but we find the Újpesti Football Club among the participants.

The champion and 2nd place finisher of the NBII played a qualifying match with the last and second to last place finishers of the NBI. According to the regulations, a class change only occurs in the event of a NBII team's victory, in all other cases the teams remain in their original class.

== League table ==
Pos	Team	Pld	W	D	L	GF	GA	GD	Pts	Promotion
1	33 FC	14	13	0	1	38	7	+31	26	Promotion to Nemzeti Bajnokság I
2	Rákosszentmihályi STE	14	11	1	2	25	14	+11	23	
3	Újpesti TE (Note: In spring Újpesti Football Club, later merged with Újpesti Athletikai Club and Újpesti Torna Egylet.)	14	7	2	5	16	11	+5	16	
4	Budapesti AK	14	7	1	6	21	28	−7	15	
5	Ganz Tisztviselők LE (Note: Formerly known as Ganz-Waggongyári Tisztviselők Labdarúgó Egylete, did not participate in the following season.)	14	5	0	9	7	47	−40	10	
6	Magyar AC (Note: Withdrew)	14	4	0	10	13	12	+1	8	
7	Budapesti Egyetemi AC (Note: Played only in the spring season, later withdrew, left the Hungarian Football Federation, did not participate in the following two seasons.)	14	2	2	10	13	14	−1	6	
8	Magyar FC (Note: Withdrew after three matches since the three defeats discouraged the players to participate.)	14	0	0	14	1	9	−8	0	

== Promotion playoff ==
The BSC therefore remained in the I. class, but the "33" FC was also promoted to the best, as the Műegyetemi FC did not enter for the next championship.

Following the example of its sister club, the Műegyetemi FC, the BEAC also left the association. The points for the unplayed matches were awarded to the opponents.

Team 1	Result	Team 2
Ferencvárosi TC (1901 NBI 3rd position)	10–2	Rákosszentmihályi Sporttelep (1901 NBII runner-up)
Budapesti SC (1901 NBI 5th position)	0–0	33 FC (1901 NBII winner)

== See also ==
- 1901 Nemzeti Bajnokság I
