= 1905 Nemzeti Bajnokság II =

Nemzeti Bajnokság II
- Season: 1905
- Champions: Budapesti AK
- Promoted: Budapesti AK; Typographia SC

The 1905 Nemzeti Bajnokság II season was the fifth edition of the Nemzeti Bajnokság II.

== League table ==
Pos	Team	Pld	W	D	L	GF	GA	GD	Pts	Promotion
1	Budapesti AK	16	16	0	0	55	7	+48	32	Promotion to Nemzeti Bajnokság I
2	Typographia SC	16	11	0	5	42	24	+18	22	Promotion to Nemzeti Bajnokság I
3	Tisztviselők LE	16	9	2	5	37	30	+7	20	
4	III. ker. TVE	16	9	1	6	27	22	+5	19	
5	Törekvés SE	16	8	3	5	27	25	+2	19	
6	Újpesti Törekvés FC	16	8	2	6	34	30	+4	16 (Note: 2 points deducted?)	
7	Budapesti SC	16	3	0	13	16	43	−27	4 (Note: 2 points deducted?)	
8	Postatakarékpénztári Alkalmazottak SE	16	2	0	14	8	29	−21	4	
9	Budapesti Egyetemi AC	16	1	0	15	3	39	−36	2	

== See also ==
- 1905 Nemzeti Bajnokság I
