= 1903 Nemzeti Bajnokság II =

Nemzeti Bajnokság II
- Season: 1903
- Country: Hungary
- Teams: 6
- Champions: Fővárosi TC
- Runner up: Újpest
- Promoted: Fővárosi TC

The 1903 Nemzeti Bajnokság II season was the third edition of the Nemzeti Bajnokság II.

== League table ==
Pos	Team	Pld	W	D	L	GF	GA	GD	Pts	Promotion
1	Fővárosi TC	10	8	1	1	20	12	+8	17	Promotion to Nemzeti Bajnokság I
2	Újpesti TE	10	7	2	1	21	11	+10	16	
3	Budapesti SC	10	6	1	3	20	12	+8	13	
4	III. ker. TVE	10	4	0	6	13	28	−15	8	
5	Budapesti AK	10	1	0	9	10	12	−2	2	
6	Rákospalotai FC	10	1	0	9	11	20	−9	2	

== See also ==
- 1903 Nemzeti Bajnokság I
