= 2025–26 Nemzeti Bajnokság I/A (women's basketball) =

Women's basketball league in Hungary

Nemzeti Bajnokság I/A
- Season: 2025–26
- Dates: Regular season: September 2025 – March 2026; Play Offs: April 2026
- Games played: 132 (Regular season); TBD (Play offs)
- Teams: 12

Finals
- Champions: NKA Universitas PEAC (1st title)
- Runners-up: DVTK HUN-Therm

The 2025–26 Nemzeti Bajnokság I/A is the 89th season of the top division of women's basketball league in Hungary since its establishment in 1933. It starts in September 2025 with the first round of the regular season and ends in March 2026.

Sopron Basket are the defending champions.

== Format ==
Each team plays each other twice. The top eight teams qualify for the play offs. The quarterfinals and semifinals are played as a best of three series while the final is played as a best of five series. The teams who don't reach the play offs advance to the play outs where one team will be relegated.

== Teams ==
=== Promotion and relegation (pre-season) ===
A total of 12 teams contest the league, including 11 sides from the 2024–25 season and one promoted from the 2024–25 B Division.

▲ Promoted from B Division	▼ Relegated to B Division
Csata TKK	Darazsak Sportakadémia

=== Venues and locations ===
Location of teams in 2025–26 Nemzeti Bajnokság I/A

Team	City	Arena	Capacity
BKG-PRIMA Szigetszentmiklós	Budapest	Szigetszentmiklós Municipal Sports and Event Hall	1,540
Csata TKK	Budapest	E.ON Sports Complex	TBD
Dávid Kornél KA	Székesfehérvár	Alba Regia Sports Hall	1,800
DVTK HUN-Therm	Miskolc	DVTK Aréna	3,550
E.ON ELTE BEAC	Budapest	László Gabányi Sports Hall	1,050
NKA Universitas PEAC	Pécs	Lauber Dezső Sports Hall	2,000
SERCO Uni Győr	Győr	University Hall of Györ	1,370
Sopron Basket	Sopron	Aréna Sopron	1,750
TARR KSC Szekszárd	Szekszárd	Szekszárd Sports Hall	850
TFSE-MTK Budapest	Budapest	Dr. Jenő Koltai Sports Center	1,308
Vasas Academy	Budapest	Pasaréti Sports Centre	299
VBW CEKK Cegléd	Cegléd	Albertirsa Sports Hall	200

== League standings ==
Pos	Team	Pld	W	L	PF	PA	PD	Pts	Qualification
1	NKA Universitas PEAC	22	21	1	1903	1328	+575	43	Play Offs
2	DVTK HUN-Therm	22	21	1	1901	1281	+620	43	Play Offs
3	Sopron Basket	22	17	5	1872	1392	+480	39	Play Offs
4	TARR KSC Szekszárd	22	15	7	1815	1556	+259	37	Play Offs
5	TFSE-MTK Budapest	22	14	8	1618	1536	+82	36	Play Offs
6	Csata TKK	22	11	11	1610	1543	+67	33	Play Offs
7	Vasas Academy	22	9	13	1447	1589	−142	31	Play Offs
8	E.ON ELTE BEAC	22	9	13	1495	1660	−165	31	Play Offs
9	VBW CEKK Cegléd	22	6	16	1384	1701	−317	28	Play Outs
10	Dávid Kornél KA	22	4	18	1598	2003	−405	26	Play Outs
11	SERCO Uni Győr	22	3	19	1491	1926	−435	25	Play Outs
12	BKG-PRIMA Szigetszentmiklós	22	2	20	1363	1982	−619	24	Play Outs

Source: Standings
Rules for classification: 1) Points; 2) Points difference; 3) Points scored.

== Results ==
Home \ Away	SZI	CSA	DAV	DVT	BEA	NKA	GYO	SOP	SZE	MTK	VAS	CEG
BKG-PRIMA Szigetszentmiklós	—	–	–	–	67–71	52–92	–	57–100	–	53–80	50–76	–
Csata TKK	84–51	—	–	62–67	–	–	78–65	–	72–75	–	–	95–57
Dávid Kornél KA	103–86	65–95	—	–	–	65–110	–	–	–	69–92	65–79	–
DVTK HUN-Therm	98–43	–	116–68	—	–	–	99–55	84–54	76–49	–	78–46	93–54
E.ON ELTE BEAC	–	60–58	83–64	61–85	—	–	65–59	–	62–83	–	–	67–64
NKA Universitas PEAC	–	82–52	103–61	62–46	92–51	—	–	–	–	93–66	78–58	78–41
SERCO Uni Győr	78–60	–	112–90	–	57–83	61–97	—	62–89	77–86	75–93	–	85–68
Sopron Basket	–	72–54	115–74	–	92–40	76–77	–	—	–	90–72	103–48	95–52
TARR KSC Szekszárd	99–46	81–70	91–62	–	–	67–78	–	63–75	—	78–66	91–69	–
TFSE-MTK Budapest	96–52	70–66	–	56–72	66–63	–	–	–	–	—	–	76–49
Vasas Academy	–	73–82	–	–	66–63	–	63–41	62–81	–	61–87	—	–
VBW CEKK Cegléd	72–71	–	63–66	51–83	–	–	–	–	51–61	–	51–67	—

Updated to match(es) played on 15 December 2025. Source: [Hungarian Women's Basketball Championship]
Legend: Blue = home team win; Red = away team win.

== Play offs ==
Quarterfinals
1	NKA Universitas PEAC	95	78	2
8	E.ON ELTE BEAC	49	49	0
4	TARR KSC Szekszárd	81	59	69	1
5	TFSE-MTK Budapest	70	65	82	2
2	DVTK HUN-Therm	85	75	2
7	Vasas Academy	43	41	0
3	Sopron Basket	93	85	2
6	Csata TKK	56	66	0

Semifinals
1	NKA Universitas PEAC	82	75	2
5	TFSE-MTK Budapest	51	38	0
2	DVTK HUN-Therm	78	58	85	2
3	Sopron Basket	68	75	66	1

Final
1	NKA Universitas PEAC	61	66	77	3
2	DVTK HUN-Therm	53	60	49	0
Third place
3	Sopron Basket	83	73	2
5	TFSE-MTK Budapest	71	52

=== 5–8 classification bracket ===
Semifinals
4	TARR KSC Szekszárd	70	81	67	1
8	E.ON ELTE BEAC	55	84	73	2
6	Csata TKK	68	73	2
7	Vasas Academy	44	59	0

Fifth place
8	E.ON ELTE BEAC	68	59	1
6	Csata TKK	86	56	1
Seventh place
4	TARR KSC Szekszárd	78	74	2
7	Vasas Academy	56	68	0

Champions of Hungary

NKA Universitas PEAC
First title
