= 1902 Nemzeti Bajnokság II =

Nemzeti Bajnokság II
- Season: 1902
- Country: Hungary
- Teams: 8
- Champions: Postások SE
- Runner up: MTK
- Promoted: Postások SE; MTK; Törekvés SE

The 1902 Nemzeti Bajnokság II season was the second edition of the Nemzeti Bajnokság II.

== League table ==
Pos	Team	Pld	W	D	L	GF	GA	GD	Pts	Promotion
1	Postások SE (Note: Former Posta- és Távirda-Tisztviselők SE)	14	13	0	1	37	11	+26	26	Promotion to Nemzeti Bajnokság I
2	MTK	14	10	2	2	27	14	+13	22	Promotion to Nemzeti Bajnokság I
3	Törekvés SE	14	10	2	2	20	9	+11	22	Promotion to Nemzeti Bajnokság I
4	Budapesti AK	14	7	1	6	16	24	−8	15	
5	III. ker. TVE	14	6	1	7	17	28	−11	13	
6	Magyar FC (Note: Withdrew after 7 matches, then disbanded)	14	2	0	12	12	26	−14	4	
7	Újpesti TE (Note: Withdrew after 11 matches)	14	2	0	12	5	22	−17	4	
8	Rákosszentmihályi STE (Note: Withdrew after 2 unplayed matches, then ceased operations for several years)	14	0	0	14	0	0	0	0	

== Promotion play-offs ==
„33” Football Clubja – Magyar Testgyakorlók Köre 2:2

Postások Sport Egyesület – Budapesti Sport Club 2:0

Magyar Testgyakorlók Köre – Magyar Athletikai Club 5:1

Postások Sport Egyesület – Magyar Athletikai Club 2:0

== See also ==
- 1902 Nemzeti Bajnokság I
