= 1904 Nemzeti Bajnokság II =

Nemzeti Bajnokság II
- Season: 1904
- Champions: Budapesti AK
- Promoted: Budapesti AK; Typographia SC

The 1904 Nemzeti Bajnokság II season was the fourth edition of the Nemzeti Bajnokság II.

== League table ==
Pos	Team	Pld	W	D	L	GF	GA	GD	Pts	Promotion
1	Újpesti TE	12	12	0	0	84	6	+78	24	Promotion to Nemzeti Bajnokság I
2	III. ker. TVE	12	7	3	2	36	24	+12	17	
3	Budapesti AK	12	6	2	4	45	28	+17	14	
4	Typographia SC	12	4	2	6	23	37	−14	10	
5	Budapesti Egyetemi AC	12	3	3	6	16	27	−11	9	
6	Tisztviselők LE	12	3	2	7	26	29	−3	8	
7	Postatakarékpénztári Alkalmazottak SE	12	0	2	10	4	83	−79	2	

== See also ==
- 1904 Nemzeti Bajnokság I
