= 1924–25 Nemzeti Bajnokság II =

Nemzeti Bajnokság II
- Season: 1924–25
- Champions: 33 FC
- Promoted: 33 FC; Erzsébeti TC
- Relegated: Ékszerészek SC; Húsiparosok SC; Terézvárosi TC; Kőbányai TE

The 1924–25 Nemzeti Bajnokság II season was the 25th edition of the Nemzeti Bajnokság II.

== League table ==
Pos	Team	Pld	W	D	L	GF	GA	GD	Pts	Promotion or relegation
1	33 FC	26	11	11	4	32	17	+15	33	Promotion to Nemzeti Bajnokság I
2	Erzsébeti TC	26	9	9	8	29	31	−2	27	Promotion to Nemzeti Bajnokság I
3	Erzsébeti MTK	26	9	8	9	28	31	−3	26	
4	Postás SE	26	10	4	12	40	43	−3	24	
5	Budapesti AK	26	9	5	12	28	28	0	23	
6	Kereskedők Atlétikai OE (Note: New name: Kereskedelmi Alkalmazottak Országos Egyesülete.)	26	9	5	12	33	42	−9	23	
7	Fővárosi TK (Note: On 25 June 1925, its results were annulled due to participation in bribery, it was ranked 10th in the championship without points. Upon the association's appeal, its points were returned on 01.07.)	26	7	8	11	33	41	−8	22	
8	Újpesti Törekvés SE	26	7	7	12	27	38	−11	21	
9	Magyar AC (Note: It will not compete in the II. division the following year, instead it will play for the Iszer Cup organized by the Amateur League.)	26	5	10	11	26	35	−9	20	
10	Újpesti MTE	26	5	7	14	24	39	−15	17	
11	Ékszerészek SC (Note: Results were annulled due to bribery, the team was banned from all leagues for 1 year.)	26	16	7	3	40	15	+25	39	Relegation
12	Húsiparosok SC (Note: Results were annulled due to bribery, the team was banned from all leagues for 1 year.)	26	15	8	3	52	22	+30	38	Relegation
13	Terézvárosi TC (Note: Results were annulled due to bribery, the team was banned from all leagues for 1 year.)	26	16	6	4	39	20	+19	38	Relegation
14	Kőbányai TE (Note: Results were annulled due to bribery, the team was removed from the MLSz membership.)	26	4	5	17	14	44	−30	13	Relegation

== Countryside championships ==
=== Western district ===
Pos	Team	Pld	W	D	L	GF	GA	GD	Pts
1	Szombathelyi AK	20	17	3	0	64	10	+54	37
2	Szombathelyi SE	20	16	2	2	65	19	+46	34
3	DAC-Hungária-Győri Vasutas SE	20	10	4	6	27	24	+3	24
4	Szombathelyi MÁV Haladás (Note: new name from May 1926 Szombathelyi MÁV Haladás Sport Club)	20	8	7	5	33	21	+12	23
5	Tatabányai SC	20	10	3	7	30	29	+1	23
6	Győri ETO	20	8	5	7	46	30	+16	21
7	Székesfehérvári Duna-Száva-Adria Vasúti Előre TK	20	5	6	9	33	39	−6	16
8	Székesfehérvári TC	20	6	4	10	30	40	−10	16
9	Győri AC	20	2	7	11	17	50	−33	11
10	Soproni FAC	20	3	4	13	19	45	−26	10
11	Kőszegi SE	20	2	1	17	11	68	−57	5

== See also ==
- 1924–25 Magyar Kupa
- 1924–25 Nemzeti Bajnokság I
