= 1911–12 Nemzeti Bajnokság II =

Nemzeti Bajnokság II
- Season: 1911–12
- Champions: Újpesti TE
- Promoted: Újpesti TE
- Relegated: Vívó és Atlétikai Club

The 1911–12 Nemzeti Bajnokság II season was the 12th edition of the Nemzeti Bajnokság II.

== League table ==
Pos	Team	Pld	W	D	L	GF	GA	GD	Pts	Promotion or relegation
1	Újpesti TE	22	21	0	1	87	16	+71	42	Promotion to Nemzeti Bajnokság I
2	Újpest-Rákospalotai AK	22	14	2	6	71	29	+42	30	
3	Fővárosi TK	22	11	6	5	32	23	+9	28	
4	Kereskedelmi Alkalmazottak OE	22	11	5	6	45	19	+26	27	
5	Budapesti Egyetemi AC	22	11	5	6	36	32	+4	27	
6	Józsefvárosi AC	22	8	6	8	29	33	−4	22	
7	Ferencvárosi SC	22	8	4	10	30	45	−15	20	
8	Erzsébetvárosi SC (Note: Formerly known as Litográfia Labdarúgó Egyesület, in November 1911 merged with Erzsébetvárosi Sport Club.)	22	7	2	13	19	58	−39	16	
9	Műegyetemi AFC	22	5	5	12	19	45	−26	15	
10	Erzsébetfalvi TC	22	5	4	13	29	47	−18	14	
11	Fővárosi Ifjak AK	22	2	10	10	18	37	−19	14	
12	Vívó és Atlétikai Club	22	2	5	15	18	49	−31	9	Relegation

== See also ==
- 1911–12 Magyar Kupa
- 1911–12 Nemzeti Bajnokság I
