= 1910–11 Nemzeti Bajnokság II =

Nemzeti Bajnokság II
- Season: 1910–11
- Champions: III. Kerületi TVE
- Promoted: III. Kerületi TVE
- Relegated: Lipótvárosi TC

The 1910–11 Nemzeti Bajnokság II season was the 11th edition of the Nemzeti Bajnokság II.

== League table ==
Pos	Team	Pld	W	D	L	GF	GA	GD	Pts	Promotion or relegation
1	III. kerületi TVE	18	13	2	3	55	19	+36	28	Promotion to Nemzeti Bajnokság I
2	Újpest-Rákospalotai AK	18	13	2	3	44	18	+26	28	
3	Kereskedelmi Alkalmazottak OE	18	9	7	2	21	12	+9	25	
4	Ferencvárosi SC	18	8	5	5	28	23	+5	21	
5	Budapesti EAC	18	6	8	4	23	22	+1	17 (Note: 3 points deducted?)	
6	Postások SE (Note: Withdrew in April 1911, dissolved due to the continues military recruitment in Hungary.)	18	8	1	9	23	22	+1	17	
7	Vívó AC	18	4	5	9	16	50	−34	13	
8	Műegyetemi AFC	18	3	5	10	8	32	−24	11	
9	Lytographia LE (Budapesti LIE) (Note: Formerly known as Budapesti Labdarúgó Ifjak Egylete until 23 October 1910, later in 1911 fusion with Erzsébetvárosi Sport Club.)	18	1	7	10	14	37	−23	9	
10	Lipótvárosi TC (Note: Withdrew in December 1910.)	18	3	2	13	15	12	+3	8	Relegation

== See also ==
- 1910–11 Magyar Kupa
- 1910–11 Nemzeti Bajnokság I
