= 1913–14 Nemzeti Bajnokság II =

Nemzeti Bajnokság II
- Season: 1913–14
- Champions: Műegyetemi AFC

The 1913–14 Nemzeti Bajnokság II season was the 14th edition of the Nemzeti Bajnokság II.

== League table ==
Pos	Team	Pld	W	D	L	GF	GA	GD	Pts	Promotion
1	Műegyetemi AFC	18	14	3	1	41	7	+34	31	Promotion to Nemzeti Bajnokság I
2	Terézvárosi TC	18	15	1	2	37	12	+25	31	
3	Fővárosi TK	18	10	2	6	37	14	+23	22	
4	Kereskedelmi Alkalmazottak OE	18	9	3	6	22	17	+5	21	
5	Ferencvárosi SC	18	9	2	7	19	19	0	20	
6	Budapesti Egyetemi AC	18	7	3	8	37	34	+3	17	
7	Budapesti TK	18	5	2	11	20	30	−10	12	
8	Józsefvárosi AC (Note: Dissolved due to the conscription.)	18	3	3	12	13	36	−23	9	
9	Erzsébetvárosi SC (Note: Merger with Erzsébetvárosi Torna Club.)	18	3	3	12	12	35	−23	9	
10	Fővárosi Ifjak AK	18	3	2	13	11	45	−34	8	

== Countryside championships ==
Transdanubia district (Győr sub group)

Pos	Team	Pld	W	D	L	GF	GA	GD	Pts
1	Tatabányai SC	12	10	1	1	-	-	—	21
2	Egyetértés TO	12	10	0	2	-	-	—	20
3	Szombathelyi AK	12	8	1	3	-	-	—	17
4	Soproni IKM TK	12	5	1	6	-	-	—	11
5	Győri Bőrdíszművesek TC	12	4	0	8	-	-	—	8
6	Szombathelyi KK	12	2	1	9	-	-	—	5
7	Győri TE	12	0	2	10	-	-	—	2

== See also ==
- 1913–14 Magyar Kupa
- 1913–14 Nemzeti Bajnokság I
