= 33 FC =

Hungarian football club

- Full name: "33" Football Clubja
- Nickname: Harihárom
- Founded: 1900
- Dissolved: 1958
- Ground: Promontor utca műfüves pálya
- Capacity: 1,750
- Chairman: Kelényi Gábor
- Manager: Ribényi Attila
- League: BLSZ
Home colours	Away colours

"33" Football Club is a Hungarian football club from the town of Óbuda, Budapest.

== History ==
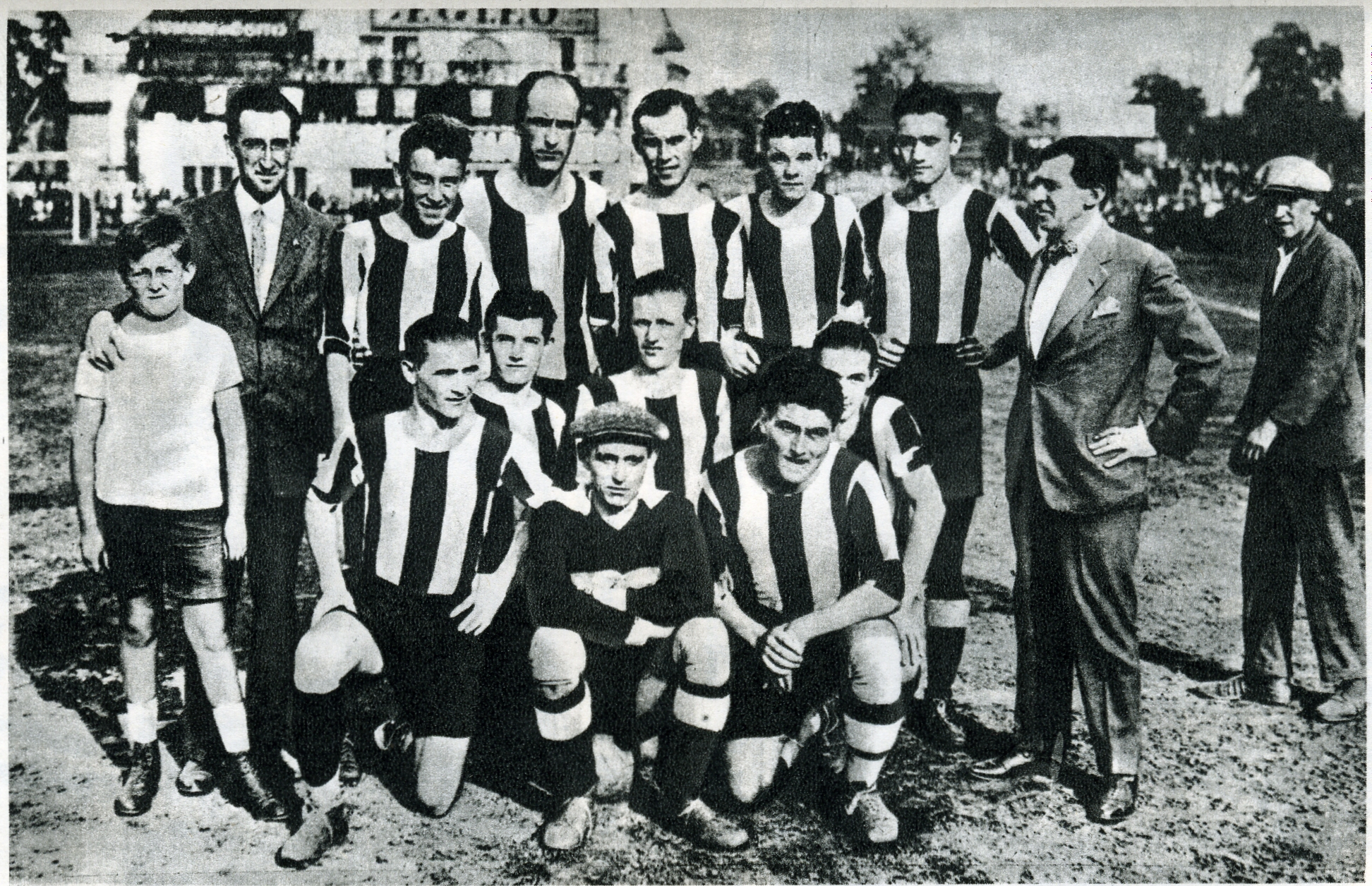
Budai 33 in 1929 after defeating Bástya 7-0

The history of 33 FC began in a private room at a small café in Krisztinaváros: in May 1900, a group of young sports enthusiasts decided to found a club, as they put it: “To play soccer, a ball game imported from England at the time that had quickly become fashionable, and to further unite the group of friends through their shared love of the sport.”

Two students from the Technical University, Rezső Hochstein and Sándor Koch, became the leaders of the group. The reason for the unusual choice of name was that the club was formed by thirty-three sports enthusiasts and good friends dedicated to the honest and enthusiastic cultivation of the sport, whose numbers were just enough to field three soccer teams.

In 1901, the team won the 1901 Nemzeti Bajnokság II, but drew 0–0 with Budapesti Sport Club in the promotion playoff, which meant they would not have been promoted. However, Műegyetemi FC, a top-division team, ultimately did not enter the competition, so 33 FC was able to compete in the top division (Nemzeti Bajnokság I). In fact, 33 FC debuted in the 1902 season of the Hungarian League and finished third. The peculiarity of the competition is illustrated by the fact that they still had to play a playoff to remain in the division, in which they drew 2–2 against MTK, securing their continued membership.

In the years that followed, 33 FC typically competed in the first division and did not suspend operations even during the war. However, the club did not have its own stadium or a permanent home ground; it sometimes hosted its opponents at Millenáris, at other times on Üllői út, or on Hungária út. In the first half of the 1920s, Harihárom moved back and forth between the first and second divisions; it finished the 1925–1926 season in eighth place in the Budapest District Nemzeti Bajnokság I, allowing it to compete among the best as a professional team, now under the name Budai 33 FC.

From 1926 to 1929, while they were named Budai 33, legendary Hungarian footballer Pál Titkos played for the club. It was his first senior team.

In 1925, when the club celebrated its 25th anniversary, a special invitation was published in Nemzeti Sport that summarized the history of the “Thirty-Threes” up to that point: “Not only has membership grown from 33 to 300, but the original spirit has remained unchanged; the club has grown from a small circle of friends into a significant social force. The motto remains the same today: Friendship and Sport!”

The club had no wealthy patrons or permanent sports facility. Following the introduction of professional football, it competed in the top division for 12 seasons. In its first season, playing as Budai Harihárom FC under János Vanicsek, with Sándor Barna as club manager, the team recorded three wins. Károly Zsák was the team’s goalkeeper.

“We deserved the win, which we really needed. The team is good, but it’s going to get even better,” said the goalkeeper after Budai 33 defeated the III. Kerületi TVAC team 6–3 on September 12, 1926, in front of 15,000 spectators at Üllői út.

Despite strengthening its roster, the Buda team finished last in the league, placing tenth overall. Due to the league's expansion, the club qualified for the promotion playoffs against Bocskay from Debrecen. Buda won the first match 2-1, while the second match in Debrecen ended in a goalless draw, allowing he team to remain in the top division.

The team solidified its position in the following years, and among others, such outstanding footballers as 32-time national team player György Orth and Antal Lyka played for the black-and-whites. At the turn of the 1920s and 1930s, the professional and amateur teams parted ways regarding the use of the name, so from February 24, 1930, the top-flight club continued to compete under the name Budai 11.

“If the amateurs say that they’re the only real ‘33s,’ we’ll respond that we, as the ‘Budai 11s,’ consider ourselves just as good as they are. The number 11 is related to 33, since 33 is nothing more than 3x11, the players of three teams. Our name may change, but in our hearts we will continue to feel like the 33s,” said one of the Buda team’s leaders.

Budai 11 consistently finished in the middle of the pack in the first half of the 1930s; the fifth-place finish in the 1932–33 Nemzeti Bajnokság I season under Lajos Faragó remains the best result in the professional team’s history. Moreover, in the fall, they lost only twice, managing a 3–3 draw as the away team against the eventual champions, Újpest. They still did not have their own stadium at the time, so they played their “home” matches on Hungária út, at the neighboring BSzKRT field (now Sport utca), on Üllői út, and at Millenáris. Here is a team named after Buda that played in Pest.

Starting in the fall of 1935, the league expanded to fourteen teams and adopted the prefix “National.” After two ninth-place finishes, we arrived at the 1937–38 season, which was the last top-flight season in the history of Budai 11; the team managed only three wins over twenty-six rounds. For example, they lost 7–6 to Nemzeti SC (!), and according to coach Faragó, the Budai defense “could be issued an official certificate of poverty…” Hungária also thoroughly routed the team, beating the black-and-whites 10–1 in May 1938; one round later, the Buda team played their final top-flight match (a 6–2 loss to Nemzeti SC).

Following their relegation, Budai 11 disbanded.

The name 33 FC, however, has not disappeared; it has been revived several times over the past few decades. Last year, Harihárom competed in Group 2 of the BLSZ IV Division, hosting its opponents at the Gázgyár sports complex

“Building on the traditions of 33 FC and the appeal of amateur soccer, and with a connection to Óbuda, we want to build a club whose matches people enjoy attending even at this level,” said team manager Gergely Apjok to Nemzeti Sport in August 2025; he is assisted in his coaching role by György Fehér, who is also known as a sports journalist. Last weekend, Csabagyöngye was scheduled to visit Óbuda, but that team has since been disqualified from the league. The Black-and-Whites will be playing away in Budatétény this weekend.

The club was dissolved in 1958.

In 2011 a new club with the same name was founded, which hitherto has been playing in the lower amateur leagues.

== Name Changes ==
- 1900–1926: 33 FC
- 1926–1929: Budai 33
- 1929–1949: Budai 11
- 1949–1957: Ganzvillany
- 1957–1958: Dohánygyár

== Honours ==
=== League ===
- Nemzeti Bajnokság II:
  - Winners (4): 1901, 1907–08, 1909–10, 1924–25
- Nemzeti Bajnokság III:
  - Winners (1): 1948–49

== Seasons ==
The table below shows 33 FC's seasons.

Season	Tier	Club's name	Position	Pts
1900	-	-	-	-
1901	2	33 FC	1 / 8	26
1902	1	33 FC	3 / 5	9
1903	1	33 FC	5 / 8	15
1904	1	33 FC	8 / 9	12
1905	1	33 FC	7 / 9	10
1906	1	33 FC	6 / 9	6
1906–07	1	33 FC	8 / 8	6
1907–08	2	33 FC	1 / 8	26
1908–09	2	33 FC	2 / 9	25
1909–10	2	33 FC	1 / 10	31
1910–11	1	33 FC	9 / 10	11
1911–12	1	33 FC	9 / 10	13
1912–13	1	33 FC	5 / 10	19
1913–14	1	33 FC	6 / 10	15
1914	1	33 FC	10 / 12	6
1915	1	33 FC	5 / 12	10
1915	1	33 FC	6 / 14	14
1916	2	33 FC	8 / 8	
1916–17	1	33 FC	10 / 12	15
1917–18	1	33 FC	7 / 12	19
1918–19	1	33 FC	7 / 12	17
1919–20	1	33 FC	15 / 15	16
1920–21	1	33 FC	13 / 15	16
1921–22	2	33 FC	7 / 15	30
1922–23	2	33 FC	2 / 15	43
1923–24	1	33 FC	11 / 12	17
1924–25	2	33 FC	1 / 14	33
1925–26	1	33 FC	8 / 12	18
1926–27	1	Budai 33 FC	10 / 10	10
1927–28	1	Budai 33 FC	8 / 12	16
1928–29	1	Budai 33 FC	10 / 12	15
1929–30	1	Budai 11 FC	7 / 12	18
1930–31	1	Budai 11 FC	9 / 12	17
1931–32	1	Budai 11 FC	6 / 12	19
1932–33	1	Budai 11 FC	5 / 12	25
1933–34	1	Budai 11 FC	7 / 12	19
1934–35	1	Budai 11 FC	8 / 12	20
1935–36	1	Budai 11 FC	9 / 14	22
1936–37	1	Budai 11 FC	9 / 14	23
1937–38	1	Budai 11 FC	14 / 14	9
1938–39	4	33 FC	10 / 14	22
1939–40	4	33 FC	10 / 14	21
1940–41	5	33 FC	2 / 14	42
1941–42	4	33 FC	12 / 14	14
1942–43	4	33 FC	10 / 14	20
1943–44	4	„33” FC	6 / 14	27
1944–45	3	33 FC	10 / 14	5
1945	2	33 FC	9 / 12	16
1945–46	2	33 FC	10 / 14	17
1946–47	3	33 FC	15 / 15	6
1947–48	3	33 FC	15 / 16	10
1948–49	4	33 FC	8 / 15	25
2011–12	8	"33" FC	1 / 14	66
2012–13	6	"33" FC	3 / 14	61
2013–14	6	"33" FC	5 / 14	44
2014–15	6	"33" FC	2 / 14	55
2015–16	6	"33" FC	5 / 14	47
2016–17	6	"33" FC	3 / 14	57
2017–18	6	"33" FC	3 / 14	48
2018–19	6	"33" FC	3 / 14	54
2019–20	6	"33" FC	6 / 14	20
2020–21	6	"33" FC	6 / 13	35
2021–22	6	"33" FC	2 / 14	56
2022–23	5	"33" FC	14 / 14	0
2023–24	6	"33" FC	7 / 16	47
2025–26	7	"33" FC	10 / 14	28
