= 1916–17 Nemzeti Bajnokság II =

Nemzeti Bajnokság II
- Season: 1916–17
- Champions: MÁV Gépgyári SK
- Promoted: MÁV Gépgyári SK

The 1916–17 Nemzeti Bajnokság II season was the 17th edition of the Nemzeti Bajnokság II.

== League table ==
Pos	Team	Pld	W	D	L	GF	GA	GD	Pts	Promotion
1	MÁV Gépgyári SK	20	16	3	1	54	14	+40	35	Promotion to Nemzeti Bajnokság I
2	Nemzeti SC	20	14	4	2	72	19	+53	32	
3	Testvériség SE	20	11	3	6	42	32	+10	25	
4	Óbudai TE	20	9	5	6	44	37	+7	23	
5	Erzsébetfalvi TC	20	9	5	6	37	30	+7	21 (Note: 2 points deducted?)	
6	Terézvárosi TC	20	8	3	9	27	34	−7	19	
7	Előre TK	20	6	5	9	29	41	−12	17	
8	Budapesti KVT TSE	20	6	4	10	22	39	−17	16	
9	Újpest-Rákospalotai AK	20	6	3	11	26	42	−16	15	
10	Festőmunkások LE	20	5	2	13	25	56	−31	12	
11	Nyomdászok TE	20	1	3	16	15	49	−34	5	
12	Kereskedelmi Alkalmazottak OE (Note: Withdrew)	0	-	-	-	-	-	—	0	

== See also ==
- 1916–17 Magyar Kupa
- 1916–17 Nemzeti Bajnokság I
