= 1912–13 Nemzeti Bajnokság II =

Nemzeti Bajnokság II
- Season: 1912–13
- Champions: III. Kerületi TVE
- Promoted: III. Kerületi TVE

The 1912–13 Nemzeti Bajnokság II season was the 13th edition of the Nemzeti Bajnokság II.

== League table ==
Pos	Team	Pld	W	D	L	GF	GA	GD	Pts	Promotion or relegation
1	III. ker. TVE	22	20	2	0	80	6	+74	42	Promotion to Nemzeti Bajnokság I
2	Erzsébetfalvi TC	22	13	5	4	50	20	+30	31	
3	Kereskedelmi Alkalmazottak OE	22	11	7	4	46	16	+30	29	
4	Fővárosi TK	22	10	3	9	39	37	+2	23	
5	Budapesti TK	22	9	5	8	34	34	0	23	
6	Újpest-Rákospalotai AK	22	11	2	9	34	34	0	22 (Note: 2 points deducted?)	
7	Erzsébetvárosi SC	22	9	1	12	26	38	−12	19	
8	Műegyetemi AFC	22	7	5	10	19	33	−14	19	
9	Budapesti Egyetemi AC	22	7	4	11	27	40	−13	18	
10	Józsefvárosi AC	22	6	6	10	25	42	−17	18	
11	Ferencvárosi SC	22	6	5	11	36	47	−11	17	
12	Fővárosi Ifjak AK	22	0	1	21	4	73	−69	1	Relegation

== See also ==
- 1912–13 Magyar Kupa
- 1912–13 Nemzeti Bajnokság I
