= 1914 Nemzeti Bajnokság II =

Nemzeti Bajnokság II
- Season: 1914
- Champions: Fővárosi TK; Újpest-Rákospalotai AK

The 1914 Nemzeti Bajnokság II season was the 15th edition of the Nemzeti Bajnokság II.

== League table ==
=== Group A ===
Pos	Team	Pld	W	D	L	GF	GA	GD	Pts
1	Fővárosi TK	7	6	1	0	29	3	+26	13
2	Óbudai TE	7	6	0	1	11	8	+3	12
3	Zuglói SC	7	5	0	2	13	12	+1	10
4	Újpest-Rákospalotai AK	7	3	1	3	4	17	−13	7
5	Nemzeti SC	7	2	1	4	7	7	0	5
6	Ferencvárosi SC	7	1	1	5	6	5	+1	3
7	Budapesti TK	7	1	1	5	4	15	−11	3
8	Ékszerészek SC	7	0	1	6	0	7	−7	1

=== Group B ===
Pos	Team	Pld	W	D	L	GF	GA	GD	Pts
1	Kelenföldi FC	0	-	-	-	-	-	—	0
2	Budapesti KVT	0	-	-	-	-	-	—	0
3	Attila SE	0	-	-	-	-	-	—	0
4	Vas- és Rézbútorosok SC	0	-	-	-	-	-	—	0
5	Fővárosi TE	0	-	-	-	-	-	—	0
6	Siketnémák SC	0	-	-	-	-	-	—	0
7	Pestújhelyi SC	0	-	-	-	-	-	—	0
8	Budapesti LK	0	-	-	-	-	-	—	0
9	Turul SE	0	-	-	-	-	-	—	0

=== Group C ===
Pos	Team	Pld	W	D	L	GF	GA	GD	Pts
1	Újpest-Rákospalotai AK	6	4	2	0	18	3	+15	10
2	Újpesti LI	6	4	2	0	12	5	+7	10
3	Palotai TK	6	2	3	1	7	10	−3	7
4	Megyeri SC	6	3	0	3	10	7	+3	6
5	Újpesti LK	6	3	0	3	10	14	−4	6
6	Újpesti Munkásképző TE	6	0	2	4	8	16	−8	2
7	Palotai Egyetértés SC	6	0	1	5	4	14	−10	1

== See also ==
- 1913–14 Magyar Kupa
- 1913–14 Nemzeti Bajnokság I
