= 1906–07 Nemzeti Bajnokság II =

Nemzeti Bajnokság II
- Season: 1906–07
- Champions: Törekvés SE
- Promoted: Törekvés SE

The 1906–07 Nemzeti Bajnokság II season was the seventh edition of the Nemzeti Bajnokság II.

== League table ==
Pos	Team	Pld	W	D	L	GF	GA	GD	Pts	Promotion
1	Törekvés SE	14	12	1	1	45	7	+38	25	Promotion to Nemzeti Bajnokság I
2	Újpest-Rákospalotai AK	14	10	1	3	32	30	+2	21	
3	Tisztviselők LE	14	10	0	4	12	15	−3	20	
4	Újpesti Törekvés FC (Note: Merged with Újpesti Torna Egylet at the end of the championship.)	14	8	2	4	19	14	+5	18	
5	III. ker. TVE (Note: Withdrew before the spring.)	14	4	3	7	11	17	−6	11	
6	Kőbányai TE	14	5	0	9	6	37	−31	10	
7	Józsefvárosi SC (Note: Withdrew in autumn, its operation was terminated for a long time.)	14	1	1	12	13	15	−2	3	
8	Magyar ÚE (Note: Withdrew after the first match.)	14	0	0	14	0	3	−3	0	

== See also ==
- 1906–07 Nemzeti Bajnokság I
