= 1909–10 Nemzeti Bajnokság II =

Nemzeti Bajnokság II
- Season: 1909–10
- Champions: 33 FC
- Promoted: 33 FC
- Relegated: Kőbányai TE

The 1909–10 Nemzeti Bajnokság II season was the tenth edition of the Nemzeti Bajnokság II.

== League table ==
Pos	Team	Pld	W	D	L	GF	GA	GD	Pts	Promotion or relegation
1	33 FC	18	15	1	2	49	14	+35	31	Promotion to Nemzeti Bajnokság I
2	Újpest-Rákospalotai AK	18	13	1	4	32	19	+13	27	
3	Postások SE	18	11	2	5	33	17	+16	24	
4	Műegyetemi AFC	18	10	2	6	35	23	+12	22	
5	Ferencvárosi SC	18	7	5	6	32	29	+3	19	
6	III. kerületi TVE	18	9	1	8	27	40	−13	19	
7	Lipótvárosi TC (Note: Participated instead of the dissolved Tisztviselők Labdarúgó Egylete.)	18	5	6	7	28	25	+3	16	
8	Kereskedelmi Alkalmazottak OE	18	5	4	9	25	35	−10	14	
9	Budapesti Egyetemi AC	18	3	2	13	11	46	−35	8	
10	Kőbányai TE (Note: Dissolved on March 1910.)	18	0	0	18	5	25	−20	0	Relegation

== Countryside championships ==
=== Pest district ===
Pos	Team	Pld	W	D	L	GF	GA	GD	Pts
1	Erzsébetfalvi TC	4	4	0	0	6	1	+5	8
2	Kispesti AC	4	2	0	2	3	5	−2	4
3	Monori SE	4	0	0	4	2	5	−3	0

== See also ==
- 1909–10 Magyar Kupa
- 1909–10 Nemzeti Bajnokság I
