= 1907–08 Nemzeti Bajnokság II =

Nemzeti Bajnokság II
- Season: 1907-08
- Champions: Győr, ETO FC; Pre-TVE; Kaposvár AC; Cluj KASK; 33 FC
- All statistics correct as of 27 January 2022.

Thanks to the extensive organizational and supportive work of the MLSz, four of the six rural districts set up in 1904 will finally start the championship struggles in the autumn of 1907. The first district league matches will take place on October 13, 1907, almost simultaneously. In the north, the Košice Athletic Club wins 7: 0 against the Košice Workers' Training Association, while in Győr, the Understanding Tournament Division beats the Bratislava-Újváros Football Association 8: 2 in the fight for the Western District Championship. The autumn round will be completed in these two districts, but they will not start in the southern and eastern (Transylvanian) districts! The MLS left it to the nominating associations to choose the place and time of the meetings, but they could not exercise excessive freedom. Eventually, in the spring, some sort of sequence developed everywhere - sometimes with federal intervention.

In addition to the above teams, there were many well-established associations on the international front (Sopron Football Club, Szeged Athletics Club, Debrecen Gymnastics Association, Zólyom Sports Association, Vác Sports Association, etc.). Their absence from the tournament can be traced back to the travel difficulties of the time and the fear of possible failures.

The MLS - although it made the departure of a minimum of three teams per district a condition - tried not to be aware of the setbacks, sometimes not even the start. He testified to his diplomatic sense that he had turned a blind eye to minor irregularities in order to start rural championships and had not rigidly insisted on a championship announcement. Neither the rural teams played this year for the title of “Best Rural Team” or “Hungary Champion Team”.

== Western District ==
The members of the team that won the championship are: Károly Beleznay, Ferenc Bischoff, Ferenc Brunner, Kálmán Grimm, Gusztáv Holicska, Ignác Jankó, Imre Krausz, Jenő Payer, Jenő Payab, Mihály Szabó.

Pos	Team	Pld	W	D	L	GF	GA	GD	Pts
1	Gyor Agreement TO	4	4	0	0	10	3	+7	8
2	Bratislava New Town LE	4	2	0	2	3	10	−7	4
3	Bratislava TE (Note: Withdrew before the first match.)	4	0	0	4	0	0	0	0

== Northern District ==
For the first time - and last - in this district, the Sóvár Gymnastics Association entered the championship (most likely at the request of the Košice teams). At the same time, the champion of the northern district last year, the Prešov TVE, withdrew their entry before the start due to repeated judging concerns and unfounded protests.

Pos	Team	Pld	W	D	L	GF	GA	GD	Pts
1	Pre-TVE (Note: Only played the fall season.)	5	3	1	1	-	-	—	7
2	Kassai AC	5	3	0	2	-	-	—	6
3	Kassai MTE	5	2	0	3	-	-	—	4
4	Košice Academies SE (Note: They joined the Košice Athletic Club in March 1908, only his autumn results were counted)	3	0	1	2	-	-	—	1

Notes:

The members of the team that won the championship are: Pál Antal, Károly Dalstrom, Áron Gutmann, József Hirschfeld, Károly Kobulszky, József Kontra, Aladár Kriebel, István Kriss, Sándor Párkányi, József Uhlarik, Kálmán Wunsch.

=== Clarification ===
STE, which is behind the team of the Sóvár Gymnastics Association, is mistaken for the 4th place in the Földessy book. In the same book, in the text section, he lists the 4 teams that took part in the tournament, and later indicates that Sóvári TE entered the next season for the first time.

== Southern District ==
Fighting in this district did not begin until April 1908, after the rural management committee, tired of the many tugs, set the dates for the matches. The Bácska SzAC still applied for a postponement, and after this was refused, he withdrew. The tournament consisted of only two matches...

Pos	Team	Pld	W	D	L	GF	GA	GD	Pts
1	Kaposvár AC	4	3	1	0	5	4	+1	7
2	Monori SE (Note: Did not start in the following year's league, citing long distances.)	4	2	1	1	4	5	−1	5
3	Bacska Subotica AC (Note: Withdrew after the draw.)	4	0	0	4	0	0	0	0

Notes:

The members of the team that won the championship: Endre Betnár, Lajos Betnár, József Kálmán, János Krizsovics, Henrik László, Lajos Péter, Jenő Oszmann, Dr. Imre Simon.

== Eastern District ==
The Târgu Mureş Sports Association and the Football Club of Cluj-Napoca were named for the first time in this district. The latter, recognizing his moderate playing power and avoiding heavy defeats, stepped back before the first match, but was soon followed by SE in Târgu Mureş.

Pos	Team	Pld	W	D	L	GF	GA	GD	Pts
1	Cluj KASK	4	3	0	1	38	6	+32	6
2	Cluj AC	4	3	0	1	16	5	+11	6
3	Cluj Railway SC	4	0	0	4	2	45	−43	0

The members of the team that won the championship are: Gyula Brunhuber, Gyula Daumé, József Fejér, Tivadar Gajzágó, Pál Héczey, Ernő Holecsek, Róbert Kuntner, István Nászta, Jenő Strauch, Manó Voith.

== Urban Second League ==
In addition to the “33” FC, who said goodbye to the Class II, the field of the Class II consisted of second-class teams and two new teams - the National Sports Club formed from the players who left the BTC and the National Association of Commercial Employees. Not named by JSC, he disappeared from football fields for years.

Accepted and rejected protests, match cancellations (which had no particular consequences at the time) and setbacks characterized the tournament and gave work to the MLS Disciplinary Committee. After all, with just one defeat and a three-point advantage, the routine Buda team took the lead. His position as a classifier was not in jeopardy for a moment, nor was that of the second NSC. A III. ker. There were also lows in the lives of TVE and MUE. The only difference between the two teams is that the Óbuda crew will soon recover, while the swimmers will first stay away from the championship fights and then in 1914 will finally disband their football team.

After the classifiers, for the first time in the history of the championships, there was no change of place between classes. Typographia Sport Club - ”33” Football Club 0: 0 Budapest Athletics Club - National Sport Club 2: 1 By the way, to the delight of the interested associations, MLSz deleted the qualifiers from its championship competitions for the following years and introduced automatic class changes.

Federal Award - II. Class

1. „33” Football Club II

Pos	Team	Pld	W	D	L	GF	GA	GD	Pts
1	33 FC	14	13	0	1	59	14	+45	26
2	Nemzeti SC	14	11	1	2	41	14	+27	23
3	Újpest-Rákospalotai AK	14	8	2	4	38	32	+6	18
4	Kereskedők AOE	14	7	2	5	15	27	−12	16
5	Kőbánya TE	14	3	4	7	15	39	−24	10
6	Tisztviselők LE	14	3	2	9	13	36	−23	8
7	Magyar ÚE (Note: They withdrew before the spring season, their league performance was finally completed)	14	3	0	11	15	21	−6	6
8	III. ker. TVE (Note: Withdrew after 9 matches.)	14	1	3	10	8	21	−13	8

Notes:

Neither the rural teams played this year for the title of “Best Rural Team” or “Hungary Champion Team”.
