= 1906 Nemzeti Bajnokság II =

Nemzeti Bajnokság II
- Season: 1906
- Champions: Tisztviselők SE

The 1906 Nemzeti Bajnokság II season was the sixth edition of the Nemzeti Bajnokság II.

== League table ==
Pos	Team	Pld	W	D	L	GF	GA	GD	Pts
1	Tisztviselők LE	4	4	0	0	11	4	+7	8
2	Törekvés SE	4	3	0	1	11	5	+6	6
3	Magyar ÚE	4	2	0	2	4	7	−3	4
4	III. ker. TVE	4	1	0	3	1	11	−10	2
5	Újpesti Törekvés FC (Note: withdrew)	4	0	0	4	0	0	0	0

== See also ==
- 1906–07 Nemzeti Bajnokság I
