= Magyar Úszó Egylet =

- Full name: Magyar Úszó Egylet
- Founded: 1893
- Dissolved: 1948
| Home colours | Away colours |

Magyar Úszó Egylet (Hungarian pronunciation: [ˈmɒɟɒr ˈuːsoː ˈɛɟlɛt]) or shortly MÚE was a Hungarian football and sport club from the town of Budapest, Hungary.

== History ==
It was one of the first football clubs opened in Hungary, having opened its football section in 1898. Magyar Úszó Egylet debuted in the 1901 season of the Hungarian League and finished second.

== Name changes ==
- 1893–?: Magyar Úszó Egylet
- ?–1945: Magyar Úszó Egyesület
- 1945–1948: Magyar Munkás Úszó Egyesület

== Honours ==
- Hungarian League
  - Runners-up (1): 1901

== Seasons ==
The table below shows the seasons of Magyar Úszó Egylet.

| Season | Tier | Club's name | Position | Pts |
|---|---|---|---|---|
| 1901 | 1 | Magyar ÚE | 2 / 5 | 10 |
| 1902 | 1 | Magyar ÚE | 5 / 5 | 3 |
| 1903 | 1 | Magyar ÚE | 6 / 8 | 11 |
| 1904 | 1 | Magyar ÚE | 4 / 9 | 16 |
| 1905 | 1 | Magyar ÚE | 8 / 9 | 6 |
| 1906 | 2 | Magyar ÚE | 3 / 5 | 4 |
| 1906–07 | 2 | Magyar ÚE | 8 / 8 | 0 |
| 1907–08 | 2 | Magyar ÚE | 7 / 8 | 6 |
