= Budapesti EAC =

Hungarian football club

- Full name: Budapesti Egyetemi Atlétikai Club
- Short name: BEAC
- Founded: 1898
- Ground: Siketek pálya
- Capacity: 1,000 (168 seated)
- Chairman: Pál Solt
- Website: http://beac.elte.hu/
Home colours	Away colours

Budapesti Egyetemi Atlétikai Club (English: Budapest University Athletic Club) is a Hungarian football club from the city of Budapest. The club was founded by the Eötvös Loránd University.

== History ==
Budapesti EAC debuted in the 1924–25 season of the Hungarian League and finished ninth.

== Name changes ==
- 1898–1948: Budapesti Egyetemi Athletikai Club
- 1948–1949: Természettudományi MEFESz
- 1949: merger with Műegyetemi MEFESz
- 1949–1950: Budapesti MEFESz
- 1950–1951: Disz FSE
- 1951: merger with Műegyetemi AFC
- 1951–1957: Budapesti Haladás SK
- 1957–present: Budapesti Egyetemi AC

== Honours ==
=== League ===
- Nemzeti Bajnokság II:
  - Winners (1): 1923–24
- Hungarian Cup:
  - Runner-up (1): 1925–26

== Seasons ==
The table below shows the seasons of Budapesti Egyetemi AC.

Season	Tier	Club's name	Position	Pts
1901	2	Budapesti Egyetemi AC	7 / 8	6
1904	2	Budapesti Egyetemi AC	5 / 7	9
1905	2	Budapesti Egyetemi AC	9 / 9	2
1909–10	2	Budapesti Egyetemi AC	9 / 10	8
1910–11	2	Budapesti Egyetemi AC	5 / 10	17
1911–12	2	Budapesti Egyetemi AC	5 / 12	27
1912–13	2	Budapesti Egyetemi AC	9 / 12	18
1913–14	2	Budapesti Egyetemi AC	6 / 10	17
1914	1	Budapesti Egyetemi AC	7 / 12	10
1915	2	Budapesti Egyetemi AC	2 / 5	11
1915	1	Budapesti Egyetemi AC	13 / 14	5
1916	2	Budapesti Egyetemi AC	4 / 6	0
1918–19	3	Budapesti Egyetemi AC	0 / 12	-
1919–20	2	Budapesti Egyetemi AC	2 / 16	49
1920–21	1	Budapesti Egyetemi AC	0 / 15	21
1921–22	2	Budapesti Egyetemi AC	5 / 15	32
1922–23	2	Budapesti Egyetemi AC	3 / 15	40
1923–24	2	Budapesti Egyetemi AC	1 / 14	43
1924–25	1	Budapesti Egyetemi AC	9 / 12	18
1925–26	1	Budapesti Egyetemi AC	9 / 12	17
1926–27	2	Budapesti Egyetemi AC	1 / 17	52
1927–28	2	Budapesti Egyetemi AC	13 / 14	14
1928–29	3	Budapesti Egyetemi AC	1 / 16	47
1929–30	2	Budapesti Egyetemi AC	9 / 14	24
1930–31	2	Budapesti Egyetemi AC	9 / 14	20
1931–32	2	Budapesti Egyetemi AC	13 / 14	18
1932–33	2	Budapesti Egyetemi AC	12 / 15	20
1933–34	2	BEAC	11 / 12	13
1934–35	3	BEAC	8 / 15	27
1935–36	3	BEAC	4 / 13	31
1936–37	3	BEAC	7 / 14	27
1937–38	3	Budapesti Egyetemi AC	12 / 14	17
1938–39	4	BEAC	12 / 14	20
1939–40	4	BEAC	4 / 14	33
1940–41	4	BEAC	5 / 13	27
1941–42	4	BEAC	10 / 14	21
1942–43	4	BEAC	5 / 14	32
1943–44	4	Budapesti Egyetemi AC	1 / 14	44
1944–45	2	BEAC	13 / 16	5
1944–45	3	BEAC	0 / 12	
1945–46	3	BEAC	5 / 12	25
1946–47	3	Budapesti Egyetemi AC	5 / 15	33
1947–48	3	BEAC	6 / 16	42
1948–49	3	Tudományegyetemi MEFESz	16 / 18	21
1949–50	3	Budapesti MEFESZ	15 / 16	17
1950	3	Budapesti DISz FSE	16 / 16	5
1951	3	Budapesti Haladás	11 / 12	14
1952	2	Budapesti Haladás	18 / 18	16
1953	2	Budapesti Haladás	10 / 16	26
1954	2	Budapesti Haladás	10 / 16	27
1955	5	DISz Főiskola	0 / 15	
1956	4	BEAC	7 / 16	29
1957–58	5	BEAC	12 / 16	19
1958–59	6	BEAC	6 / 14	11
1959–60	5	BEAC	1 / 16	53
1960–61	4	BEAC	9 / 16	30
1961–62	4	BEAC	11 / 16	28
1962–63	4	BEAC	1 / 16	46
1963	4	BEAC	1 / 16	21
1964	4	BEAC	12 / 16	27
1965	4	BEAC	6 / 16	31
1966	4	BEAC	3 / 16	39
1967	3	BEAC	8 / 16	29
1968	3	BEAC	12 / 16	28
1969	3	BEAC	13 / 16	27
1970	3	BEAC	15 / 16	7
1970–71	3	BEAC	15 / 16	18
1971–72	4	BEAC	2 / 16	37
1972–73	4	BEAC	5 / 16	33
1973–74	4	BEAC	11 / 16	27
1974–75	4	BEAC	16 / 18	24
1975–76	5	BEAC	13 / 16	25
1976–77	5	BEAC	13 / 16	22
1977–78	5	BEAC	4 / 16	38
1978–79	4	BEAC	11 / 16	22
1979–80	4	BEAC	7 / 16	31
1980–81	4	BEAC	9 / 16	28
1981–82	5	BEAC	11 / 16	26
1982–83	5	BEAC	12 / 16	24
1983–84	5	BEAC	12 / 16	23
1984–85	5	BEAC	9 / 16	25
1985–86	5	BEAC	8 / 16	32
1986–87	5	Budapesti Egyetemi AC	7 / 16	32
1988–89	4	BEAC	11 / 16	26
1989–90	4	BEAC	13 / 16	29
1990–91	4	BEAC	6 / 16	30
1991–92	4	BEAC	4 / 16	32
1992–93	4	BEAC	14 / 16	17
1993–94	5	BEAC	3 / 16	40
1994–95	5	BEAC	1 / 16	76
1995–96	4	BEAC	8 / 16	46
1996–97	4	BEAC	11 / 16	32
1997–98	5	BEAC	16 / 16	21
1998–99	6	BEAC	1 / 16	77
1999–00	5	BEAC	6 / 16	52
2000–01	5	BEAC	14 / 16	28
2001–02	6	BEAC	12 / 16	27
2002–03	6	BEAC	10 / 16	34
2003–04	6	BEAC	6 / 16	55
2004–05	6	BEAC	13 / 16	28
2005–06	5	BEAC	11 / 16	35
2006–07	5	BEAC	12 / 16	34
2007–08	5	BEAC	10 / 16	34
2008–09	5	BEAC	10 / 16	37
2009–10	5	Budapesti Egyetemi AC	9 / 16	35
2010–11	5	BEAC	13 / 16	36
2011–12	5	Budapesti Egyetemi AC	12 / 16	35
2012–13	5	Budapesti Egyetemi AC	15 / 16	13
2013–14	6	Budapesti Egyetemi AC	9 / 14	36
2014–15	6	Budapesti Egyetemi AC	3 / 14	45
2015–16	6	Budapesti Egyetemi AC	2 / 14	63
2016–17	6	Budapesti Egyetemi AC	4 / 14	55
2017–18	6	Budapesti Egyetemi AC	8 / 14	34
2018–19	6	Budapesti Egyetemi AC	10 / 14	27
2019–20	6	Budapesti Egyetemi AC	10 / 14	16
2020–21	6	Budapesti Egyetemi AC	6 / 14	44
2021–22	5	Budapesti Egyetemi AC	13 / 14	14
2022–23	6	Budapesti Egyetemi AC	3 / 14	55
2023–24	5	Budapesti Egyetemi AC	12 / 14	18
2024–25	6	Budapesti Egyetemi AC	8 / 14	34
2025–26	6	Budapesti Egyetemi AC	9 / 14	26

== Managers ==
- (Hungary) Pál Várhidi

== Notable members ==
- Peter Bakonyi
