= 1901 Nemzeti Bajnokság I =

Nemzeti Bajnokság I
- Season: 1901
- Country: Hungary
- Champions: Budapesti TC

Final standings of the 1901 Hungarian League season. This was the first football championship held in Hungary, and only Budapest based teams participated.

== Final standings ==
Pos	Team	Pld	W	D	L	GF	GA	GR	Pts	Result
1	Budapesti TC	8	8	0	0	37	5	7.400	16	Champions
2	Magyar Úszó Egylet	8	5	0	3	17	20	0.850	10	
3	Ferencvárosi TC	8	3	1	4	20	28	0.714	7	
4	Műegyetemi AFC	8	2	1	5	11	8	1.375	5	Withdrew after four matches
5	Budapesti SC	8	1	0	7	7	31	0.226	2	

Source: rsssf.com

== Results ==
Home \ Away	BSC	BTC	FTC	MÚE	MGY
Budapesti SC		0–5	4–5	2–4	+:- (Note: The games were each evaluated with 0:0 and wins for the opponents of Műegyetem.)
Budapesti TC	4–0		8–0	7–0	5–2
Ferencváros	5–1	3–5		3–5	2–2
Magyar ÚE	4–0	0–3	3–2		+:-
Műegyetem	4–0	-:+	-:+	3–1	

Source: rsssf.com
Legend: Blue = home team win; Yellow = draw; Red = away team win.
