= Károly Zsák =

Hungarian footballer

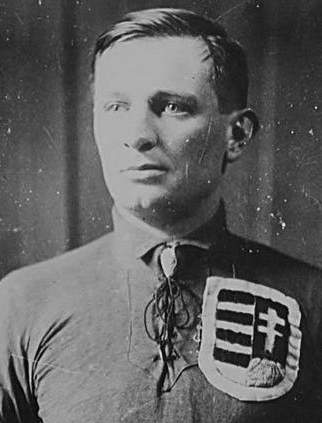
Károly Zsák

Károly Zsák (30 August 1895 in Budapest – 2 November 1944 in Budapest) was a Hungarian amateur association football player.

He was a member of the Hungarian Olympic squad at the 1912 Summer Olympics. He was an unused reserve player for the duration of the games and did not play a match in the 1912 football tournament and 1924 football tournament.

For the Hungary national football team he played 30 games as goalkeeper.
