= 1911–12 Nemzeti Bajnokság I =

Nemzeti Bajnokság I
- Season: 1911–12
- Country: Hungary
- Champions: Ferencvárosi TC

Statistics of Nemzeti Bajnokság I for the 1911–12 season.

== Overview ==
It was contested by 10 teams, and Ferencvárosi TC won the championship.

== League standings ==
Pos	Team	Pld	W	D	L	GF	GA	GR	Pts
1	Ferencvárosi TC	18	14	2	2	74	17	4.353	30
2	MTK Budapest FC	18	9	4	5	38	22	1.727	22
3	Budapesti AK	18	8	4	6	36	36	1.000	20
4	Magyar AC	18	8	3	7	37	39	0.949	19
5	Terézvárosi TC	18	7	3	8	24	43	0.558	17
6	Törekvés SE	18	7	2	9	25	25	1.000	16
7	Nemzeti SC	18	7	2	9	26	39	0.667	16
8	Budapesti TC	18	6	3	9	29	30	0.967	15
9	33 FC	18	5	3	10	16	34	0.471	13
10	III. Kerületi TUE	18	5	2	11	25	45	0.556	12

Source: rsssf.com

== Results ==
Home \ Away	33F	KER	BAK	BTC	FTC	MAC	MTK	NEM	TER	TÖR
33 FC		3–1	0–1	0–0	0–4	1–2	0–4	0–1	0–1	1–0
III. Kerület	0–3		2–1	0–2	3–11	2–2	1–0	4–3	5–1	1–2
Budapesti AK	1–1	2–1		3–2	3–5	1–3	2–5	2–2	5–2	2–2
Budapesti TC	2–3	1–1	1–2		0–2	4–2	1–0	0–1	6–1	0–2
Ferencváros	5–0	5–1	4–1	2–3		6–1	0–0	7–0	6–0	2–1
Magyar AC	3–1	1–0	0–1	1–1	2–9		5–1	1–3	0–1	1–4
MTK Budapest	4–0	4–1	2–2	2–1	1–0	1–1		1–2	2–0	1–0
Nemzeti	3–0	2–0	1–4	5–2	0–1	1–3	0–6		0–3	0–2
Terézváros	2–2	1–0	2–0	2–1	0–0	2–6	4–4	2–1		1–0
Törekvés	0–1	2–1	1–3	1–2	1–5	0–3	2–0	1–1	4–0	

Source: rsssf.com
Legend: Blue = home team win; Yellow = draw; Red = away team win.
