= Újpest-Rákospalotai AK =

Hungarian football club

- Full name: Újpest-Rákospalotai Atlétikai Klub
- Founded: 1902
- Dissolved: 1945
- Ground: Mező utcai pálya (1902–1912); URAK pálya (1912–1945)
| Home colours | Away colours |

Újpest-Rákospalotai Atlétikai Klub was a football club from the town of Újpest and Rákospalota, Hungary.

== History ==
Újpest-Rákospalotai AK won the 1914 Nemzeti Bajnokság II season.

== Grounds ==
Between 1902 and 1912, the club played their home matches at the Mező utca ground. From 1912, the club played their matches at the URAK (Újpest-Rákospalotai AK) pitch, now located in the Rákospalota forest, now belongs to Újpest.

== Name changes ==
- Újpest-Rákospalotai Atlétikai Klub: 1902–1945

== Honours ==
=== League ===
- Nemzeti Bajnokság II:
  - Winners (1): 1914
  - Runners-up (5): 1906–07, 1909–10, 1910–11, 1911–12, 1915
  - Third place (1): 1907–08
- Nemzeti Bajnokság III:
  - Winners (1): 1942–43

== Seasons ==
The table below shows the seasons of Újpest-Rákospalotai AK.

| Season | Tier | Club's name | Position | Pts |
|---|---|---|---|---|
| 1906–07 | 2 | Újpest-Rákospalotai AK | 2 / 8 | 21 |
| 1907–08 | 2 | Újpest-Rákospalotai AK | 3 / 8 | 18 |
| 1908–09 | 2 | Újpest-Rákospalotai AK | 4 / 9 | 18 |
| 1909–10 | 2 | Újpest-Rákospalotai AK | 2 / 10 | 27 |
| 1910–11 | 2 | Újpest-Rákospalotai AK | 2 / 10 | 28 |
| 1911–12 | 2 | Újpest-Rákospalotai AK | 2 / 12 | 30 |
| 1912–13 | 2 | Újpest-Rákospalotai AK | 6 / 12 | 22 |
| 1913–14 | 2 | Újpest-Rákospalotai AK | 3 / 9 | |
| 1914 | 2 | Újpest-Rákospalotai AK | 4 / 8 | 7 |
| 1914 | 2 | Újpest-Rákospalotai AK | 1 / 7 | 10 |
| 1915 | 2 | Újpest-Rákospalotai AK | 2 / 12 | 18 |
| 1915 | 2 | Újpest-Rákospalotai AK | 3 / 12 | 17 |
| 1916 | 2 | Újpest-Rákospalotai AK | 4 / 8 | 5 |
| 1916–17 | 2 | Újpest-Rákospalotai AK | 9 / 12 | 15 |
| 1917–18 | 2 | Újpest-Rákospalotai AK | 7 / 12 | 14 |
| 1918–19 | 2 | Újpest-Rákospalotai AK | 8 / 12 | 18 |
| 1919–20 | 2 | Újpest-Rákospalotai AK | 6 / 17 | 37 |
| 1920–21 | 2 | Újpest-Rákospalotai AK | 5 / 14 | 30 |
| 1921–22 | 2 | Újpest-Rákospalotai AK | 12 / 15 | 23 |
| 1922–23 | 3 | Újpest-Rákospalotai AK | 4 / 15 | 32 |
| 1923–24 | 3 | Újpest-Rákospalotai AK | 5 / 15 | 36 |
| 1924–25 | 3 | Újpest-Rákospalotai AK | 1 / 14 | 38 |
| 1925–26 | 2 | Újpest-Rákospalotai AK | 12 / 14 | 18 |
| 1926–27 | 2 | Újpest-Rákospalotai AK | 5 / 17 | 43 |
| 1927–28 | 2 | Újpest-Rákospalotai AK | 5 / 14 | 32 |
| 1928–29 | 2 | Újpest-Rákospalotai AK | 9 / 10 | 10 |
| 1929–30 | 3 | Újpest-Rákospalotai AK | 1 / 15 | 43 |
| 1930–31 | 2 | Újpest-Rákospalotai AK | 10 / 14 | 18 |
| 1931–32 | 2 | Újpest-Rákospalotai AK | 9 / 14 | 21 |
| 1932–33 | 2 | Újpest-Rákospalotai AK | 11 / 15 | 22 |
| 1933–34 | 2 | URAK | 6 / 12 | 21 |
| 1934–35 | 2 | Újpest-Rákospalotai AK | 7 / 12 | 19 |
| 1935–36 | 2 | Újpest-Rákospalotai AK | 9 / 13 | 19 |
| 1936–37 | 2 | Újpest-Rákospalotai AK | 8 / 13 | 22 |
| 1937–38 | 2 | Újpest-Rákospalotai AK | 14 / 14 | 14 |
| 1938–39 | 3 | URAK | 10 / 15 | 26 |
| 1939–40 | 3 | Újpest-Rákospalotai AK | 7 / 13 | 22 |
| 1940–41 | 4 | Újpest-Rákospalotai AK | 9 / 13 | 20 |
| 1941–42 | 4 | URAK | 1 / 13 | 32 |
| 1942–43 | 3 | URAK | 1 / 14 | 42 |
| 1943–44 | 2 | Újpest-Rákospalotai AK | 9 / 16 | 27 |
| 1944–45 | 2 | URAK | 10 / 16 | 8 |
| 1944–45 | 2 | URAK | 0 / 12 | |
