= 1905 Nemzeti Bajnokság I =

Nemzeti Bajnokság I
- Season: 1905
- Country: Hungary
- Champions: Ferencvárosi TC
- Relegated: Magyar Úszó Egylet; Műegyetemi AFC

Final standings of the Hungarian League 1905 season. The championship title of the unbeaten Postás was withdrawn half year after the last match, due to a bribery scandal.

== Final standings ==
Pos	Team	Pld	W	D	L	GF	GA	GR	Pts	Qualification or relegation
1	Ferencvárosi TC	16	11	4	1	54	12	4.500	26	Champions
2	Budapesti Postás SE	15	11	4	0	33	9	3.667	26	Bribery scandal
3	MTK Budapest FC	16	10	3	3	55	11	5.000	23	
4	Újpest FC	16	8	2	6	35	22	1.591	18	
5	Magyar AC	16	8	1	7	40	19	2.105	17	
6	Fővárosi TC	15	4	4	7	29	30	0.967	12	Bribery scandal
7	33 FC	16	5	2	9	15	42	0.357	12	
8	Magyar Úszó Egylet	16	2	2	12	13	65	0.200	6	Relegated to NB II
9	Műegyetemi AFC	16	1	0	15	6	70	0.086	2	Relegated to NB II

Source: rsssf.com

== Results ==
Home \ Away	33F	FTC	FŐV	MAC	MÚE	MGY	MTK	POS	ÚJP
33 FC		2–1	0–5	0–2	3–2	-:+ (Note: The match was settled with a goalless win.)	1–8	0–7	1–3
Ferencváros	3–0		3–0	2–0	5–2	14–0	2–2	0–0	2–0
Főváros	0–0	3–3		1–0	3–3	7–1	0–5	– (Note: The result of the match between Főváros and Postások (7–0) has been annulled. The encounter was not repeated.)	1–7
Magyar AC	2–1	1–3	1–0		4–0	2–0	1–2	1–2	1–3
Magyar ÚE	2–2	0–12	3–1	0–9		0–3	0–3	0–5	0–5
Műegyetem	1–3	-:+	0–8	0–11	-:+		1–15	-:+	-:+
MTK Budapest	6–0	-:+	+:-	0–1	7–0	2–0		1–2	2–1
Postások	+:-	1–1	0–0	4–3	1–0	3–0	1–1		2–0
Újpest	0–2	1–3	4–0	1–1	2–1	5–0	1–1	2–5	

Source: rsssf.com
Legend: Blue = home team win; Yellow = draw; Red = away team win.
