= 1902 Nemzeti Bajnokság I =

Nemzeti Bajnokság I
- Season: 1902
- Country: Hungary
- Champions: Budapesti TC

Statistics of Nemzeti Bajnokság I for the 1902 season.

== Overview ==
It was contested by 5 teams, and Budapesti TC won the championship.

== League standings ==
Pos	Team	Pld	W	D	L	GF	GA	GR	Pts	Qualification or relegation
1	Budapesti TC	8	7	1	0	31	4	7.750	15	Champions
2	Ferencvárosi TC	8	4	1	3	14	13	1.077	9	
3	33 FC	8	3	3	2	11	12	0.917	9	
4	Budapesti SC	8	2	0	6	4	33	0.121	4	Relegated to NB II
5	Magyar Úszó Egylet	8	1	1	6	7	8	0.875	3	

Source: rsssf.com

== Results ==
Home \ Away	33F	BSC	BTC	FTC	MÚE
33 FC		2–0	2–2	2–1	1–1
Budapesti SC	3–1		1–8	0–4	+:- (Note: The matches were each rated 0:0 and victories for the opponents of Magyar ÚE.)
Budapesti TC	2–0	10–0		5–1	2–0
Ferencváros	3–3	3–0	0–2		+:-
Magyar ÚE	-:+	5–0	-:+	1–2	

Source: rsssf.com
Legend: Blue = home team win; Yellow = draw; Red = away team win.
