= 1903 Nemzeti Bajnokság I =

Nemzeti Bajnokság I
- Season: 1903
- Country: Hungary
- Champions: Ferencvárosi TC

Statistics of Nemzeti Bajnokság I for the 1903 season.

== Overview ==
It was contested by 8 teams, and Ferencvárosi TC won the championship.

== League standings ==
Pos	Team	Pld	W	D	L	GF	GA	GR	Pts
1	Ferencvárosi TC	14	10	1	3	51	11	4.636	21
2	Budapesti TC	14	8	3	3	34	9	3.778	19
3	MTK Budapest FC	14	9	0	5	41	17	2.412	18
4	Budapesti Postás SE	14	7	3	4	28	12	2.333	17
5	33 FC	14	6	3	5	23	32	0.719	15
6	Magyar Úszó Egylet	14	5	1	8	12	25	0.480	11
7	Magyar AC	14	4	1	9	19	40	0.475	9
8	Törekvés SE	14	1	0	13	6	68	0.088	2

Source: rsssf.com

== Results ==
Home \ Away	33F	BTC	FTC	MAC	MÚE	MTK	POS	TÖR
Postások		0–1	1–2	7–0	5–1	3–0	2–2	4–0
Budapesti TC	2–0		3–1	5–0	5–0	1–2	-:+ (Note: The match was settled with a goalless win.)	7–0
Ferencváros	1–1	1–2		5–1	2–0	3–1	-:+	8–1
Magyar AC	0–1	0–0	0–6		5–1	3–2	1–2	5–0
Magyar ÚE	0–2	0–0	-:+	1–0		2–0	3–1	+:-
MTK Budapest	1–0	3–1	0–3	6–0	1–0		9–1	14–0
33 FC	2–2	2–2	1–5	4–1	4–0	0–2		+:-
Törekvés	-:+	0–5	0–14	0–3	0–4	-:+	5–4	

Source: rsssf.com
Legend: Blue = home team win; Yellow = draw; Red = away team win.
