= Műegyetemi AFC =

Hungarian football club

- Full name: Műegyetemi Atlétikai és Football Club
- Nickname: MAFC
- Founded: 1897
- Ground: Promontor utcai Stadion
- Capacity: 4,000
- Chairman: Gyula Bretz
- Website: http://mafc.hu/
Home colours	Away colours

Műegyetemi Atlétikai és Football Club (English: Technical University Athletics and Football Club) or MAFC is a Hungarian football club from the city of Budapest. It is the oldest still active football club in Hungary, and it currently plays in the II. regional Budapest league. It is the football club of Budapest University of Technology and Economics.

== History ==
The club was founded as Műegyetemi Football Csapat (MFC - Technical University Football Club) by the students of the Budapest Technical University, Alfréd Hajós and Ferenc Gillemot, on 1 November 1897. At the time MFC started operating as the second, independent university sports club in the country. Students have considered the club an integral part of the university since its inception, and this fact has been consistently expressed in the name and regulations of the club. The first statute, adopted in 1900, set the goal of spreading and cultivating exercise. It took part in the first official football match between different clubs to be played in Hungary, on 6 February 1898, when it won against Budapesti TC 5–0, despite BTC having trained the MFC players in the prior months. The club soon also became involved in athletics, and in 1903 it became known as the Technical University Athletics and Football Club, Műegyetemi Atlétikai és Football Club. It was one of the founders of the Hungarian football league and played in the first season of the Hungarian League in 1901, and it finished third.

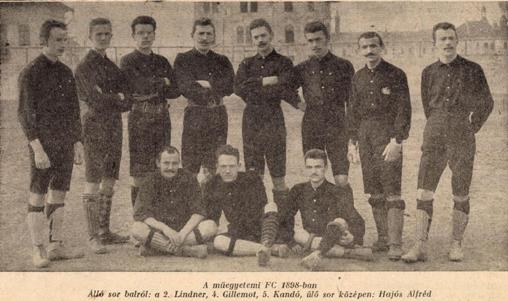
Műegyetemi FC's first eleven in one of its first games in history during year 1898.

As a result of the growing sports interest, teacher president Richard Zielinski built a fencing, wrestling, boxing and target shooting hall in the palace of the new Technical University in Lágymányos, and has contracted a number of coaches: the world boxing champion Bobby Dobbs, the Italian fencing champion Italo Santelli, and the world boxing champion János Weigand. Under their guidance, MAFC boxers, wrestlers and fencers developed and joined the swimming section, which was already active in Europe in the 1910s.

With their interest in football, the former founders could not have imagined laying the foundations for a club that could look back on a rich history even a hundred years later.

The club had a merit in introducing and promoting many sports in Budapest. It took active part in the introduction of football, swimming, athletics, boxing, gymnastics, fencing at the beginning of the century, and also in the thirties it still played a big role in national sports.

The members of the club were initiators and fighters in the formation of independent associations in several sports. In recognition of their successful activities in Hungary, several club members have also been elected to the boards of international sports federations. Dr. Leó Donáth and Artúr Kankovszky have made an outstanding contribution to building the reputation of Hungarian sports and MAFC through his activities as Secretary General of the International Swimming Association.

MAFC has been also at the forefront of the development of university and college sports. It played an important role in establishing the College Sports Association and building international university relationships. The club can also claim the organization of the first National College Championship. In terms of international relations, the club had a permanent relationship with the University of Oxford as early as the early 1900s. It later established contacts with higher education institutions in Prague, Berlin, Sofia, Cluj-Napoca, Moscow, Dresden, Tallinn, Karlsruhe and Trieste.

Looking back on the past, MAFC athletes won medals at several Olympics or World Championships, European Championships. MAFC also organized athletic programs intended to provide some sports education and training for a number of university students.

== Honours ==
- Nemzeti Bajnokság II:
  - Winners (2): 1913–14, 1921–22

== Name Changes ==
- 1897–1903: Műegyetemi FC
- 1903–1951: Műegyetemi AFC
- 1951–1954: Dísz FSE
- 1954–1955: Budapesti Haladás
- 1957–2012: Műegyetemi Atlétikai és Football Club
- 2012–present: Műegyetemi Atlétikai és Football Club EEDA

== Seasons ==
The table below shows the seasons of Műegyetemi FC.

Season	Tier	Club's name	Position	Pts
1901	1	Műegyetemi FC	4 / 5	5
1904	1	Műegyetemi AFC	7 / 9	13
1905	1	Műegyetemi AFC	9 / 9	2
1908–09	2	Műegyetemi AFC	5 / 9	15
1909–10	2	Műegyetemi AFC	4 / 10	22
1910–11	2	Műegyetemi AFC	8 / 10	11
1911–12	2	Műegyetemi AFC	9 / 12	15
1912–13	2	Műegyetemi AFC	8 / 12	19
1913–14	2	Műegyetemi AFC	1 / 10	31
1919–20	1	Műegyetemi AFC	14 / 15	16
1920–21	1	Műegyetemi AFC	0 / 15	27
1921–22	2	Műegyetemi AFC	1 / 15	39
1922–23	1	Műegyetemi AFC	12 / 12	8
1923–24	2	Műegyetemi AFC	14 / 14	5
1924–25	3	Műegyetemi AFC	10 / 14	25
1925–26	2	Műegyetemi AFC	3 / 13	34
1926–27	2	Műegyetemi AFC	11 / 16	25
1927–28	2	Műegyetemi AFC	10 / 14	24
1928–29	3	Műegyetemi AFC	15 / 16	16
1929–30	4	Műegyetemi AFC	5 / 12	24
1930–31	4	Műegyetemi AFC	13 / 15	20
1931–32	4	Műegyetemi AFC	6 / 16	30
1932–33	4	Műegyetemi AFC	1 / 16	46
1933–34	3	MAFC	1 / 14	41
1934–35	2	MAFC	6 / 12	20
1935–36	2	MAFC	9 / 13	24
1936–37	2	MAFC	6 / 12	22
1937–38	2	MAFC	10 / 14	21
1938–39	3	Műegyetemi AFC	14 / 14	16
1939–40	3	MAFC	13 / 14	11
1940–41	4	MAFC	12 / 13	17
1941–42	4	MAFC	1 / 14	43
1942–43	3	MAFC	10 / 14	20
1943–44	3	MAFC	8 / 16	31
1944–45	2	MAFC	14 / 16	4
1944–45	3	MAFC	0 / 12	
1945–46	4	MAFC	11 / 13	0
1946–47	4	Műegyetemi AFC	10 / 13	15
1947–48	4	MAFC	10 / 15	17
1948–49	4	Műegyetemi MEFESz	15 / 15	2
1951	5	Haladás Műszaki Egyetem	0 / 12	
1952	5	Haladás Műszaki Egyetem	0 / 14	
1953	5	Haladás Műszaki Egyetem	8 / 14	22
1955	4	Műszaki Egyetem	11 / 16	25
1956	4	MAFC	8 / 17	31
1957–58	5	Műegyetemi AFC	5 / 16	30
1958–59	5	MAFC	9 / 16	13
1959–60	5	MAFC	8 / 15	29
1960–61	5	MAFC	2 / 16	45
1961–62	4	MAFC	12 / 16	25
1962–63	4	MAFC	6 / 16	37
1963	5	MAFC	5 / 16	17
1964	5	MAFC	4 / 16	35
1965	5	MAFC	7 / 14	30
1966	5	MAFC	1 / 14	36
1967	4	MAFC	10 / 16	28
1968	4	MAFC	14 / 16	27
1969	4	MAFC	4 / 16	35
1970	4	MAFC	12 / 16	12
1970–71	4	MAFC	16 / 16	19
1971–72	5	MAFC	2 / 16	40
1972–73	4	MAFC	4 / 16	33
1973–74	4	MAFC	10 / 16	30
1974–75	4	Műegyetemi AFC	4 / 18	42
1975–76	4	MAFC	11 / 18	34
1976–77	4	MAFC	13 / 18	32
1977–78	4	MAFC	10 / 18	33
1978–79	3	MAFC	13 / 20	35
1979–80	3	MAFC	20 / 20	21
1980–81	4	MAFC	10 / 16	27
1981–82	5	MAFC	3 / 16	41
1982–83	5	Műegyetemi AFC	1 / 16	44
1983–84	4	Műegyetemi AFC	13 / 16	22
1984–85	4	MAFC	14 / 16	23
1985–86	4	MAFC	10 / 16	26
1986–87	4	Műegyetemi AFC	8 / 16	32
1987–88	4	MAFC	11 / 16	28
1988–89	4	MAFC	15 / 16	19
1989–90	4	MAFC	16 / 16	23
1990–91	5	MAFC	3 / 15	38
1992–93	4	Műegyetemi AFC	11 / 16	22
1993–94	4	MAFC	15 / 16	19
1994–95	5	MAFC I.	2 / 16	65
1995–96	4	MAFC	13 / 16	19
1996–97	4	MAFC	15 / 16	21
1997–98	5	MAFC	15 / 16	28
1998–99	5	MAFC	15 / 16	22
1999–00	6	MAFC	5 / 16	45
2000–01	6	MAFC	5 / 16	53
2001–02	6	MAFC	5 / 16	51
2002–03	6	MAFC	3 / 16	48
2003–04	6	MAFC	2 / 16	64
2004–05	6	MAFC	1 / 16	71
2005–06	4	MAFC	3 / 16	54
2006–07	4	MAFC	4 / 18	55
2007–08	4	MAFC	10 / 18	43
2008–09	4	Műegyetemi AFC	9 / 16	39
2009–10	4	Műegyetemi AFC	15 / 16	20
2010–11	5	MAFC	10 / 16	39
2011–12	5	Műegyetemi AFC	11 / 16	37
2012–13	5	Műegyetemi AFC EEDA	11 / 16	38
2013–14	5	Műegyetemi AFC EEDA	6 / 16	47
2014–15	5	Műegyetemi AFC	3 / 16	55
2015–16	4	Műegyetemi AFC	13 / 16	25
2016–17	4	Műegyetemi FC	15 / 16	0
2017–18	5	Műegyetemi AFC	7 / 16	40
2018–19	5	Műegyetemi FC	14 / 16	16
2019–20	6	Műegyetemi FC	4 / 14	28
2020–21	6	Műegyetemi FC	4 / 14	49
2021–22	5	Műegyetemi FC	12 / 14	25
2022–23	5	Műegyetemi FC	13 / 14	18
2023–24	5	Műegyetemi FC	11 / 14	25
2024–25	6	Műegyetemi FC	13 / 14	20
2025–26	7	Műegyetemi FC	5 / 13	43

== See also ==
- Budapest University of Technology and Economics
