= III. Kerületi TVE =

Hungarian football club

- Full name: III. Kerületi Torna és Vívó Egylet
- Founded: 24 January 1887; 139 years ago
- Ground: Hévízi úti Stadion, Budapest
- Capacity: 3,000
- Coach: Tamás Harmati
- League: NB III; Northwest
- 2022–23: NB III; West, 5th of 20
- Website: https://www.tve1887.hu/
Home colours	Away colours

III. kerületi Torna- és Vívóegylet - formerly also known as III. Kerületi TUE or III. Kerületi TTVE - is a Hungarian football club based in Óbuda in the III district (kerületi) of Budapest. It was founded on 24 January 1887. The club colours are blue and white. The club plays in the third division (Nemzeti Bajnokság III) at its home stadium, the Hévízi út.

In the final of the Hungarian Cup of the season 1930/31 the club, then playing as III. Kerületi TVE, they defeated Ferencvárosi TC 4−1.

== History ==
One of the oldest sports associations in Hungary was founded as III. kerületi Torna- és Vívóegylet (III District Gymnastics and Fencing Association) on January 24, 1887, in one of the small restaurants in Óbuda. The choice of the name was made in the spirit of the time, athletics, cycling and the rest feel in the "gymnastics" part of the name, while a special emphasis was put on "fencing", which was a major sport in many parts of the world at the time.

The club did not have a football section, and this was formed late, when football started to become popular in Budapest. The real beginning of football in Óbuda can be traced back to October 31, 1897, when members of the two most important associations in this district of Budapest, the III. Kerületi TVE (founded in and Óbudai Torna Egylet (the Óbuda Gymnastics Association, founded in 1872) decided to create the Budai Football Csapat (Buda Football Club). This "marriage" ended with the founding of III Kerületi TVE's own football team on April 30, 1899. Either the date 1897 or 1899 is considered as official starting date of the football club nowadays.

III. District TVE made its debut in Hungary's first division NB I in 1911, and stayed in the highest division without interruption between 1913 and 1937, reaching its greatest successes in the twenties and thirties. In 1931 it defeated Ferencváros 4–1 in the final of the Hungarian Cup, and in 1914 he finished 3rd in the Augusta Cup. In NB I, it was pushed off the podium four times, and finished fourth in 1921, 1925, 1930 and 1933. It took almost six decades for the club to get back to the NB I: in 1996 it was the champion of the NB II East Group. It immediately dropped out again and it got bak to NB I in 1998, and i t dropped out again 4 years later.

In 2000 III. Kerületi TVE's football section merged with Csepel SC and moved the first team to Csepel Island. For the next two years the club played under the Csepel SC name. The youth teams stayed in Óbuda. The football section of Csepel got dissolved in summer 2002 and in 2003 the senior football team re-formed at the club then called III. Kerületi TUE, back in the III district. The team started in the fourth division which the club won undefeated. Since then the team has been playing in the Hungarian third division until 2021, when it got promoted to the NB II once again.

On 14 September 2024, they were eliminated by Kisvárda FC from the 2024–25 Magyar Kupa season. The match ended with a goalless draw and Kerület lost on penalties.

== Honours ==
- Hungarian Cup
  - Winners (1): 1930–31
- Nemzeti Bajnokság III
  - Winners (4): 1963, 1964, 1986–87, 2020–21

== Seasons ==
The table below shows the seasons of III. Kerületi TVE.

Season	Tier	Club's name	Position	Pts
1902	2	III. ker. TVE	5 / 8	13
1903	2	III. ker. TVE	4 / 6	8
1904	2	III. ker. TVE	2 / 7	17
1905	2	III. ker. TVE	4 / 9	19
1906	2	III. ker. TVE	4 / 5	2
1906–07	2	III. ker. TVE	5 / 8	11
1907–08	2	III. ker. TVE	8 / 8	5
1908–09	2	III. ker. TVE	7 / 9	13
1909–10	2	III. ker. TVE	6 / 10	19
1910–11	2	III. ker. TVE	1 / 10	28
1911–12	1	III. ker. TVE	10 / 10	12
1912–13	2	III. ker. TVE	1 / 12	42
1913–14	1	III. ker. TVE	9 / 10	10
1914	1	III. ker. TVE	3 / 12	14
1915	1	III. ker. TVE	9 / 12	9
1915	1	III. ker. TVE	7 / 14	14
1916–17	1	III. ker. TVE	5 / 12	22
1917–18	1	III. ker. TVE	6 / 12	23
1918–19	1	III. ker. TVE	6 / 12	20
1919–20	1	III. ker. TVE	9 / 15	24
1920–21	1	III. ker. TVE	4 / 15	24
1921–22	1	III. Ker. TVE	5 / 12	21
1922–23	1	III. Ker. TVE	7 / 12	21
1923–24	1	III. Ker. TVE	8 / 12	18
1924–25	1	III. ker. TVE	4 / 12	23
1925–26	1	III. Ker. TVE	7 / 12	21
1926–27	1	III. Kerületi TVAC	5 / 10	18
1927–28	1	III. Kerület FC	5 / 12	19
1928–29	1	III. Kerület FC	6 / 12	20
1929–30	1	III. kerületi FC	4 / 12	25
1930–31	1	III. Kerület FC	6 / 12	21
1931–32	1	III. Kerület FC	5 / 12	24
1932–33	1	III. kerület FC	4 / 12	26
1933–34	1	III. Kerület FC	9 / 12	18
1934–35	1	III. Kerület FC	10 / 12	17
1935–36	1	III. Kerület FC	8 / 14	23
1936–37	1	III. Kerület FC	13 / 14	8
1937–38	2	III. Kerületi TVE	12 / 14	20
1938–39	3	III. ker. TVE	8 / 15	27
1939–40	3	III. ker. TVE	5 / 13	27
1940–41	3	III. ker. Árpád SE	5 / 10	21
1941–42	3	ÁMOTE	6 / 12	26
1942–43	2	ÁMOTE	11 / 14	19
1943–44	2	OTE III. ker. (ÁMOTE)	5 / 15	34
1944–45	2	OTE III. ker.	1 / 16	17
1944–45	2	OTE III. ker.	0 / 11	
1945	2	III. ker. MaDISz	3 / 12	31
1945–46	2	III. ker. TVE MaDISz	1 / 14	41
1946–47	2	III. ker. TVE	6 / 14	27
1947–48	2	III. ker. TVE	10 / 14	21
1948–49	2	III. ker. TVE	12 / 16	24
1949–50	2	III. ker. Textilmunkás	8 / 16	29
1950	2	III. ker. Textilmunkás	6 / 16	16
1951	2	III. kerületi Vörös Lobogó	11 / 14	20
1952	2	Vörös Lobogó Textilfestő	12 / 18	30
1953	3	Vörös Lobogó Textilfestő	4 / 16	35
1954	3	Vörös Lobogó Textilfestő	4 / 16	43
1955	3	Vörös Lobogó Textilfestő	2 / 16	48
1956	3	Vörös Lobogó Textilfestő	7 / 14	26
1957	3	III. ker. TVE	1 / 8	21
1957–58	3	III. ker. TVE	6 / 16	35
1958–59	3	III. ker. TTVE	9 / 16	28
1959–60	3	III. ker. TTVE	10 / 16	31
1960–61	3	III. ker. TTVE	2 / 16	36
1961–62	3	III. ker. TTVE	6 / 16	34
1962–63	3	III. Kerületi TTVE	3 / 16	37
1963	3	III. Kerületi TTVE	1 / 18	27
1964	3	III. Kerületi TTVE	1 / 18	50
1965	2	III. kerületi TTVE	16 / 16	14
1966	3	III: Kerületi TTVE	14 / 18	27
1967	3	III. kerületi TTVE	2 / 16	40
1968	3	III. ker. TTVE	14 / 16	24
1969	4	III. ker. TTVE	3 / 16	37
1970	4	III. ker. TTVE	2 / 16	22
1970–71	4	III. ker. TTVE	5 / 16	34
1971–72	4	III. ker. TTVE	1 / 16	49
1972–73	3	III. ker. TTVE	6 / 16	33
1973–74	3	III. ker. TTVE	8 / 16	27
1974–75	3	III. Kerületi TTVE	19 / 20	25
1975–76	4	III. Kerületi TTVE	3 / 18	46
1976–77	4	III. Kerületi TTVE	3 / 18	47
1977–78	4	III. Kerületi TTVE	9 / 18	33
1978–79	3	III. Kerületi TTVE	9 / 20	39
1979–80	3	III. Kerületi TTVE	4 / 20	47
1980–81	3	III. Kerületi TTVE	2 / 20	51
1981–82	3	III. Kerületi TTVE	4 / 18	42
1982–83	3	III. Kerületi TTVE	15 / 18	26
1983–84	4	III. Kerületi TTVE	1 / 16	43
1984–85	3	III. Kerületi TTVE	14 / 18	28
1985–86	3	III. Kerületi TTVE	5 / 18	41
1986–87	3	III. Kerületi TTVE	1 / 18	51
1987–88	2	III. Kerületi TTVE	15 / 20	34
1988–89	2	III. Kerületi TTVE	12 / 16	38
1989–90	2	III. Kerületi TTVE	8 / 16	42
1990–91	2	III. Kerületi TTVE	4 / 16	40
1991–92	2	III. Kerületi TVE	8 / 16	31
1992–93	2	III. Kerületi TVE	8 / 16	31
1993–94	2	III. Kerületi TVE	3 / 16	34
1994–95	2	III. Kerületi TVE	5 / 16	48
1995–96	2	III. Kerületi TVE	1 / 16	63
1996–97	1	III. Kerületi TVE	15 / 18	35
1997–98	2	III. Kerületi TVE	3 / 20	74
1998–99	1	III. Kerületi FC Autotrader	18 / 18	18
1999–00	2	III. Kerület FC	10 / 20	55
2000–01	-	-	-	-
2001–02	-	-	-	-
2002–03	5	III. Kerületi TUE	1 / 16	76
2003–04	4	III. Kerületi TUE	12 / 16	34
2004–05	4	III. Kerületi TUE	12 / 15	28
2005–06	3	III. Kerületi TUE	8 / 18	53
2006–07	3	III. Kerületi TUE	10 / 14	30
2007–08	3	III. Kerületi TUE	7 / 16	46
2008–09	3	III. Kerületi TUE	13 / 16	30
2009–10	4	III. Kerületi TUE	1 / 16	74
2010–11	4	III. Kerületi TUE	2 / 16	61
2011–12	3	III. Kerületi TUE	12 / 16	28
2012–13	3	III. Kerületi TVE	9 / 15	36
2013–14	4	III. kerületi TVE	1 / 16	78
2014–15	3	III. Kerületi TVE	10 / 16	34
2015–16	3	III. Kerületi TVE	12 / 17	39
2016–17	3	III. Kerületi TVE	8 / 18	45
2017–18	3	III. Kerületi TVE	5 / 16	50
2018–19	3	III. kerületi TVE	5 / 16	49
2019–20	3	III. kerületi TVE	2 / 16	41
2020–21	3	III. kerületi TVE	1 / 20	88
2021–22	2	III. Kerületi TVE	20 / 20	37
2022–23	3	III. kerületi TVE	5 / 20	68
2023–24	3	III. kerületi TVE	4 / 16	61
2024–25	3	III. kerületi TVE	6 / 16	48
2025–26	3	III. kerületi TVE	4 / 16	61
