= Újpesti Törekvés SE =

Hungarian football club

- Full name: Újpesti Törekvés Sport Egylet
- Founded: 1908
- Dissolved: 1950
- Ground: Népszigeti pálya
- Capacity: 2,000
Home colours

Újpesti Törekvés Sport Egylet was a Hungarian football club from the town of Újpest, Hungary.

== History ==
Újpesti Törekvés Sport Egylet debuted in the 1923–24 season of the Hungarian League and finished ninth.

== Name Changes ==
- 1908–1925: Újpesti Törekvés Sport Egylet
- 1924: merger with Újpesti SC
- 1925: merger with Palotai NTE
- 1925: Újpest-Rákospalotai Törekvés SE
- 1925: the two clubs separated
- 1925–1927: Újpesti Törekvés Sport Egylet
- 1927–1928: Újpesti Törekvés Football Club
- 1928–1944: Újpesti Törekvés Sport Egylet
- 1944: Mátyás Újpesti Törekvés SE
- 1945–1948: Mauthner Újpesti Törekvés SE
- 1948: merger with Pannónia
- 1948–1949: Pannónia-UTSE
- 1949–1950: Bőripari Dolgozók SE III.

== Honours ==
- Nemzeti Bajnokság II:
  - Winners (1): 1922–23

== Seasons ==
The table below shows the seasons of Újpesti Törekvés SE.

Season	Tier	Club's name	Position	Pts
1912–13	4	Újpesti Törekvés SE	1 / 12	43
1913–14	2	Újpesti Törekvés SE	4 / 9	
1915	3	Újpesti Törekvés SE	1 / 9	13
1916	2	Újpesti Törekvés SE	2 / 8	10
1916–17	2	Újpesti Törekvés SE	2 / 12	23
1917–18	2	Újpesti Törekvés SE	1 / 12	40
1918–19	2	Újpesti Törekvés SE	1 / 12	37
1919–20	1	Újpesti Törekvés SE	13 / 15	19
1920–21	2	Újpesti Törekvés SE	3 / 14	34
1921–22	2	Újpesti Törekvés SE	8 / 15	29
1922–23	2	Újpesti Törekvés SE	1 / 15	45
1923–24	1	Újpesti Törekvés SE	12 / 12	14
1924–25	2	Újpesti Törekvés SE	8 / 14	21
1925–26	2	Újpesti Törekvés SE	3 / 14	37
1926–27	2	Újpesti Törekvés SE	9 / 16	29
1927–28	3	Újpesti Törekvés FC	4 / 12	24
1928–29	3	Újpesti Törekvés SE	12 / 16	27
1929–30	4	Újpesti Törekvés SE	6 / 12	21
1930–31	4	Újpesti Törekvés SE	4 / 15	35
1931–32	4	Újpesti Törekvés SE	3 / 16	35
1932–33	4	Újpesti Törekvés SE	3 / 16	43
1933–34	3	Újpesti Törekvés SE	6 / 14	31
1934–35	3	UTSE	3 / 14	33
1935–36	3	UTSE	9 / 13	20
1936–37	3	Újpesti Törekvés SE	13 / 14	14
1937–38	4	Újpesti Törekvés SE	13 / 14	15
1938–39	5	Újpesti Törekvés SE	4 / 14	32
1939–40	4	UTSE	8 / 14	21
1940–41	5	UTSE	3 / 14	36
1941–42	5	Újpesti Törekvés SE	2 / 14	41
1942–43	4	Újpesti Törekvés SE	3 / 14	31
1943–44	3	UTSE	10 / 16	27
1944–45	2	Mátyás UTSE	2 / 16	16
1944–45	3	UTSE	0 / 12	
1945	2	Újpesti Törekvés SE	2 / 12	39
1945–46	2	Mauthner Újpesti Törekvés SE	6 / 14	31
1946–47	3	Újpesti Törekvés SE	9 / 15	23
1947–48	3	Újpesti Törekvés SE	15 / 16	10
1948–49	4	Pannonia-UTSE	4 / 15	39
1949–50	4	Bőripari Dolgozók SE III.	4 / 16	40
1950 ősz	4	Bőripari DSE III.	9 / 16	14
