= Budapesti SC =

Hungarian football club

- Full name: Budapesti Sport Club
- Nickname: BSC
- Founded: 1900
- Dissolved: 1905
Home colours	Away colours

Budapesti Sport Club was a Hungarian football club from the town of Budapest. Budapesti SC was one of the founding clubs of the Hungarian League in 1901.

== History ==
Budapesti SC debuted in the 1901 season of the Hungarian League and finished fifth.
