= Fővárosi TK =

Hungarian football club

- Full name: Fővárosi Testedzők Köre
- Founded: 1909
- Dissolved: 1949
Home colours

Fővárosi Testedzők Köre was a Hungarian football club from the town of Budapest.

== History ==
Fővárosi Testedzők Köre debuted in the 1916-17 season of the Hungarian League and finished ninth.

== Name Changes ==
- 1909-1949: Fővárosi Testedzők Köre
- 1922: merger with Acél Torna Egylet
- 1926: foundation of a new club, Zuglói VII. Kerületi AC as Turul FC
- 1949: merger with Magyar Acél SE

== Seasons ==
The table below shows the seasons of Fővárosi TK.

| Season | Tier | Club's name | Position | Pts |
|---|---|---|---|---|
| 1909–10 | 3 | Fővárosi TK | 5 / 10 | 25 |
| 1910–11 | 3 | Fővárosi TK | 1 / 11 | 38 |
| 1911–12 | 2 | Fővárosi TK | 3 / 12 | 28 |
| 1912–13 | 2 | Fővárosi TK | 4 / 12 | 23 |
| 1913–14 | 2 | Fővárosi TK | 3 / 10 | 22 |
| 1914 | 2 | Fővárosi TK | 1 / 8 | 13 |
| 1915 | 1 | Fővárosi TK | 8 / 12 | 9 |
| 1915 | 1 | Fővárosi TK | 5 / 14 | 15 |
| 1916 | 2 | Fővárosi TK | 6 / 8 | 3 |
| 1916–17 | 1 | Fővárosi TK | 12 / 12 | 11 |
| 1917–18 | 2 | Fővárosi TK | 4 / 12 | 26 |
| 1918–19 | 2 | Fővárosi TK | 7 / 12 | 20 |
| 1919–20 | 2 | Fővárosi TK | 9 / 17 | 33 |
| 1920–21 | 2 | Fővárosi TK | 12 / 14 | 13 |
| 1921–22 | 3 | Fővárosi TK | 11 / 15 | 21 |
| 1922–23 | 3 | Fővárosi TK | 1 / 15 | 46 |
| 1923–24 | 2 | Fővárosi TK | 9 / 14 | 24 |
| 1924–25 | 2 | Fővárosi TK | 7 / 14 | 22 |
| 1925–26 | 2 | Fővárosi TK | 1 / 14 | 39 |
| 1926–27 | 2 | Fővárosi TK | 17 / 17 | 0 |
| 1927–28 | 3 | Fővárosi TK | 17 / 17 | 8 |
| 1928–29 | 4 | Fővárosi TK | 11 / 16 | 28 |
| 1929–30 | 5 | Fővárosi TK | 4 / 12 | 28 |
| 1930–31 | 5 | Fővárosi TKör | 1 / 14 | 43 |
| 1931–32 | 4 | Fővárosi TKör | 4 / 16 | 34 |
| 1932–33 | 4 | Fővárosi TKör | 1 / 16 | 50 |
| 1933–34 | 3 | Főv. TKör | 4 / 14 | 31 |
| 1934–35 | 3 | Főv. TKör | 9 / 14 | 24 |
| 1935–36 | 3 | Fővárosi TKör | 4 / 13 | 31 |
| 1936–37 | 3 | Főv. Tkör | 4 / 14 | 34 |
| 1937–38 | 3 | Főv. TKör | 3 / 14 | 33 |
| 1938–39 | 3 | Főv. TKör | 14 / 15 | 21 |
| 1939–40 | 3 | Fővárosi TKör | 12 / 13 | 16 |
| 1940–41 | 4 | Fővárosi TKör | 4 / 13 | 27 |
| 1941–42 | 4 | Főv. TKör | 2 / 13 | 32 |
| 1942–43 | 3 | Főv. TKör | 8 / 14 | 24 |
| 1943–44 | 3 | Fővárosi TK | 13 / 16 | 17 |
| 1944–45 | 2 | Főv. TKör | 16 / 16 | 3 |
| 1944–45 | 3 | Fővárosi TKör | 0 / 12 | |
| 1947–48 | 5 | Fővárosi TKör | 4 / 16 | 41 |
| 1948–49 | 5 | Fővárosi TKör | 13 / 16 | 16 |
