= Lipótvárosi TC =

Hungarian football club

Lipótvárosi Torna Club
- Full name: Lipótvárosi Torna Club
- Founded: 1900
Home colours	Away colours

Lipótvárosi Torna Club was a football club from the town of Lipótváros, Budapest, Hungary.

== History ==
Lipótváros TC won the 1906 Nemzeti Bajnokság II season, as Ganz Tisztviselők Labdarúgó Egylete.

== Name changes ==
- Ganz-Waggongyári Tisztviselők Labdarúgó Egylete: ?–1901
- Ganz Tisztviselők Labdarúgó Egylete: 1901–1909
- Lipótvárosi Torna Club: 1909–1911
- Tisztviselők Labdarúgó Egylete: 1911–1913

== Honours ==
=== League ===
- Nemzeti Bajnokság II:
  - Winners (1): 1906
  - Third place (2): 1905, 1906–07
