= Kereskedők AOE =

Hungarian football club

Kereskedők Atlétikai OE
- Full name: Kereskedők Atlétikai Országos Egyesülete
- Founded: 1896
Home colours	Away colours

Kereskedők Atlétikai Országos Egyesülete was a football club from the city of Budapest, Hungary.

== History ==
Kereskedők Atlétikai Országos Egyesülete finished in the third position four times in the Nemzeti Bajnokság II.

== Name changes ==
- Kereskedelmi Alkalmazottak Országos Egyesülete: 1896 - 1916
- 1916 dissolved
- 1918 reestablished
- Kereskedelmi Alkalmazottak Országos Egyesülete: 1918 - 1922
- Kereskedők Atlétikai Országos Egyesülete: 1922 - 1925
- Kereskedelmi Alkalmazottak Országos Egyesülete: 1925 - 1943
- Kereskedelmi Alkalmazottak Országos Sport Egyesülete: 1945 - 1946
- 1946 merger with Ferencvárosi Barátság
- KAOE Barátság: 1946 - 1947
- 1947 merger with Gyapjúmosó

== Honours ==
=== League ===
- Nemzeti Bajnokság II:
  - Third place (4): 1910–11, 1912–13, 1919–20, 1920–21

== Seasons ==
The table below shows the seasons of Kereskedelmi Alkalmazottak OE.

Season	Tier	Club's name	Position	Pts
1907–08	2	Kereskedelmi Alkalmazottak OE	4 / 8	16
1908–09	2	Kereskedelmi Alkalmazottak OE	6 / 9	13
1909–10	2	Kereskedelmi Alkalmazottak OE	8 / 10	14
1910–11	2	Kereskedelmi Alkalmazottak OE	3 / 10	25
1911–12	2	Kereskedelmi Alkalmazottak OE	4 / 12	27
1912–13	2	Kereskedelmi Alkalmazottak OE	3 / 12	29
1913–14	2	Kereskedelmi Alkalmazottak OE	4 / 10	21
1914	1	Kereskedelmi Alkalmazottak OE	1 / 9	
1915	1	Kereskedelmi Alkalmazottak OE	12 / 12	2
1915	1	Kereskedelmi Alkalmazottak OE	10 / 14	10
1916	2	Kereskedelmi Alkalmazottak OE	5 / 8	4
1916–17	2	Kereskedelmi Alkalmazottak OE	12 / 12	-
1918–19	3	Kereskedelmi Alkalmazottak OE	0 / 12	-
1919–20	2	Kereskedelmi Alkalmazottak OE	3 / 16	42
1920–21	2	Kereskedelmi Alkalmazottak OE	3 / 14	37
1921–22	2	Kereskedelmi Alkalmazottak OE	6 / 15	30
1922–23	2	Kereskedők Atlétikai OE	9 / 15	25
1923–24	2	Kereskedők Atlétikai OE	7 / 14	24
1924–25	2	Kereskedők Atlétikai OE	6 / 14	23
1925–26	2	Kereskedelmi Alkalmazottak OE	10 / 14	20
1926–27	2	Kereskedelmi Alkalmazottak OE	13 / 16	21
1927–28	2	Kereskedelmi Alkalmazottak OE	9 / 14	24
1928–29	2	Kereskedelmi Alkalmazottak OE	9 / 10	9
1929–30	3	KAOE	15 / 15	10
1930–31	4	KAOE	10 / 15	26
1931–32	4	KAOE	9 / 16	26
1932–33	4	KAOE	9 / 16	29
1933–34	4	KAOE	11 / 13	15
1934–35	4	KAOE	10 / 11	12
1935–36	5	KAOE	2 / 11	29
1936–37	4	KAOE	7 / 15	25
1937–38	4	KAOE	12 / 14	16
1938–39	5	KAOE	8 / 14	26
1939–40	4	KAOE	13 / 14	8
1940–41	5	KAOE	9 / 14	19
1941–42	5	KAOE	11 / 14	22
1942–43	5	KAOE	14 / 14	0
1945	2	KAOE	7 / 12	24
1945–46	2	KAOE	10 / 14	15
1946–47	3	KAOE Barátság	14 / 14	8
