= 1943–44 Nemzeti Bajnokság III =

Nemzeti Bajnokság III
- Season: 1943–44
- Champions: Cikta LE Martfű (Alföld), Szabadkai AFC (Bácska); Székesfehérvári MÁV Előre TK (Buda); Dorogi AC (Danube); Kolozsvári AC II (Kolozsvár); Hatvani VSE (Mátra); KISTEXT SK (Pest); Nagykanizsai Vasutas TE (Southwest); Kassai VSC (Subcarpathia); Nagyváradi Törekvés NMK (Szamos); Komáromi FC (Transdanubia) Székelyudvarhelyi Hargita (Transylvania, North); Sepsiszentgyörgyi SE (Transylvania, South)
- Promoted: No promotions
- Relegated: No relegations

The 1943–44 Nemzeti Bajnokság III season was the 4th edition of the Nemzeti Bajnokság III.

== League tables ==
There were no promotions or relegations at the end of the season.

=== Alföld group ===
Pos	Team	Pld	W	D	L	GF	GA	GD	Pts
1	Cikta LE Martfű	26	19	1	6	80	29	+51	39
2	Csabai AK	26	18	2	6	69	26	+43	38
3	Szegedi HASE	26	18	1	7	71	35	+36	37
4	Szegedi TK	26	15	4	7	63	46	+17	34
5	Békéscsabai MÁV	26	14	3	9	52	37	+15	31
6	Makói AK	26	14	3	9	59	48	+11	31
7	Gyulai TE	26	12	3	11	44	53	−9	27
8	Szolnoki MÁV II.	26	11	3	12	48	47	+1	25
9	Csongrádi LE	26	11	2	13	63	58	+5	24
10	Szolnoki LE	25	9	4	12	48	45	+3	22 (Note: The Szolnoki LE vs. Szentesi MÁV match was not played; neither team received any points.)
11	Mezőkovácsházi TE	26	8	0	18	35	70	−35	16
12	Törökszentmiklósi LE	26	7	2	17	33	69	−36	16
13	Szentesi MÁV	25	4	4	17	19	82	−63	12
14	Mezőberényi SE	26	3	4	19	34	99	−65	10

=== Bácska group ===
Pos	Team	Pld	W	D	L	GF	GA	GD	Pts
1	Szabadkai AFC	28	25	1	2	107	34	+73	51
2	Bácska Szabadkai AC	28	23	2	3	104	32	+72	48
3	MOVE Zombori TK	28	16	5	7	71	40	+31	37
4	Zombori MÁV SE	28	15	4	9	65	40	+25	34
5	Zombori SE	28	14	5	9	58	37	+21	33
6	Újvidéki Vasutas AK	28	12	4	12	74	61	+13	28
7	Bezdáni SE	28	12	4	12	50	54	−4	28
8	MOVE Szabadkai SE	28	13	1	14	57	72	−15	27
9	Bajai Türr István SE	28	12	2	14	60	61	−1	26
10	Kulai AFC	28	10	5	13	59	73	−14	25
11	Temerini TC	28	11	2	15	60	66	−6	24
12	Bácsalmási MOVE	28	7	4	17	43	71	−28	18
13	Jánoshalmi SE	28	5	4	19	37	116	−79	14
14	Adai SC	28	3	2	23	22	94	−72	8
15	Újvidéki AC II. 1	0	0	0	0	0	0	0	0

=== Buda group ===
Pos	Team	Pld	W	D	L	GF	GA	GD	Pts
1	Székesfehérvári MÁV Előre TK	30	24	3	3	140	42	+98	51
2	Wesselényi Miklós SE	30	20	3	7	116	37	+79	43
3	Pesterzsébeti Kossuth Munkás SE	30	17	8	5	89	51	+38	42
4	Siófoki SE	30	20	2	8	83	50	+33	42
5	Hajmáskéri SE	30	17	5	8	57	53	+4	39
6	Kelenföldi FC	30	15	2	13	75	72	+3	32
7	Várpalotai Bányász SE	30	13	5	12	73	63	+10	31
8	MAFC	30	13	5	12	57	51	+6	31
9	Magyar Posztógyári SE	30	11	6	13	68	69	−1	28
10	MOVE Csillaghegyi TSE	30	10	3	17	55	78	−23	23
11	MOVE Szent László FC	30	10	3	17	60	99	−39	23
12	Tárnoki KLE	30	7	7	16	55	85	−30	21
13	MOVE Pesterzsébeti Rákóczi	30	9	3	18	46	94	−48	21
14	MOVE Szentendrei TSE	30	7	7	16	45	96	−51	21
15	Oetl SC	30	6	5	19	49	79	−30	17
16	MOVE Ferencvárosi Törekvés SE	30	5	5	20	38	87	−49	15

=== Duna group ===
1	Dorogi AC	30	24	5	1	118 : 29	53
2	MOVE TE	30	24	2	4	99 : 33	50
3	VI. kerületi SC	30	22	3	5	94 : 43	47
4	Magyar Acél SE	30	18	5	7	98 : 50	41
5	Váci Reménység	30	16	7	7	96 : 45	39
6	Budapesti TK	30	14	6	10	66 : 49	34
7	Váci SE	30	16	2	12	63 : 61	34
8	Werbőczy SE	30	16	2	12	73 : 85	34
9	Lévai TE	30	14	3	13	58 : 78	31
10	UTSE	30	10	7	13	59 : 81	27
11	Herminamezei AC	30	11	2	17	65 : 75	24
12	MOVE Rákosszentmihályi TSE	30	7	6	17	36 : 81	20
13	Fővárosi TK	30	8	1	21	49 : 87	17
14	Párkányi TE	30	7	0	23	38 : 80	14
15	PATE	30	4	1	25	42 : 108	9
16	Rézhenger SC (RéSC) 1	30	3	0	27	22 : 91	6

=== Southwestern group ===
Pos	Team	Pld	W	D	L	GF	GA	GD	Pts
1	Nagykanizsai Vasutas TE	24	17	3	4	83	38	+45	37
2	Kaposvári Turul SE	24	16	3	5	67	38	+29	35
3	Nagykanizsai Zrinyi MTE	24	15	4	5	80	31	+49	34
4	Nagymányoki SE	24	12	5	7	99	60	+39	29
5	Pécsi VSK	24	14	1	9	66	49	+17	29
6	Dombóvári Vasutas SE	24	11	5	8	77	51	+26	27
7	Pécsi BTC	24	12	1	11	64	51	+13	25
8	Csáktornyai Zrinyi TE	24	10	2	12	50	67	−17	22
9	Pécsi Zsolnay SE	24	8	4	12	38	53	−15	20
10	Simontornyai Bőrgyári TC	24	7	4	13	35	51	−16	18
11	Pálmonostori CSE	24	7	3	14	51	65	−14	17
12	Barcsi LE	24	6	2	16	44	74	−30	14
13	Bonyhádi Zománc TE	24	2	1	21	27	153	−126	5

=== Subcarpathia ===
1	Kassai VSC	20	19	0	1	108 : 21	38
2	MOVE Szabolcs	20	15	2	3	68 : 24	32
3	MÁV Sátoraljaújhelyi AC	20	12	2	6	52 : 41	26
4	Alberttelepi MÁVAG	20	10	1	9	38 : 43	21
5	Aknaszlatinai BTE	20	10	0	10	30 : 46	20
6	Miskolci MOVE	20	9	1	10	39 : 44	19
7	Királyházi MÁV	20	7	2	11	37 : 63	16
8	Csapi MÁV SE	20	5	2	13	26 : 72	12
9	Nyíregyházi Vasutas SC	20	2	3	15	21 : 69	7
10	Beregszászi FTC 1	20	9	3	8	58 : 42	19
11	Nagyszöllősi LSE 2	20	4	0	16	25 : 37	8

=== Szamos ===
1	Nagyváradi Törekvés NMK	22	12	6	4	75 : 35	30
2	Nagyváradi MÁV	22	12	6	4	47 : 22	30
3	Szatmári Törekvés	22	10	8	4	39 : 33	28
4	Püspökladányi MÁV TK	22	11	5	6	35 : 29	27
5	Debreceni Villanygyár SC	22	9	9	4	45 : 41	27
6	Debreceni VSC II.	22	10	3	9	75 : 38	23
7	Nagybányai Petrozsény SE	22	10	3	9	32 : 33	23
8	Szatmári Vasutas TE	22	8	4	10	28 : 42	20
9	Nagybányai Jószerencse SE	22	7	5	10	36 : 45	19
10	Nagykárolyi AC	22	4	6	12	23 : 58	14
11	Szatmári SE	22	4	5	13	27 : 46	13
12	Érmihályfalvi LE	22	3	4	15	20 : 60	10

=== Transdanubia ===
1	Komáromi FC	26	16	4	6	93 : 50	36
2	Újpesti TE II	26	15	3	8	56 : 50	33
3	II. ker. SC (Győr)	26	13	6	7	70 : 63	32
4	Csepeli GyTK (Csepel II.)	26	12	7	7	86 : 51	31
5	Soproni FAC	26	15	1	10	72 : 56	31
6	Postás SE	26	11	8	7	70 : 44	30
7	Ferencvárosi TC II	26	14	2	10	84 : 57	30
8	Soroksári AC	26	12	5	9	62 : 52	29
9	Gamma SzSE (Gamma II.)	26	10	5	11	54 : 62	25
10	Budafoki MTE	26	8	8	10	55 : 59	24
11	Budafoki LE	26	6	8	12	34 : 58	20
12	Hangya SE	26	6	6	14	40 : 62	18
13	EMERGÉ SC	26	8	2	16	53 : 97	18
14	Soproni Selyem SE	26	2	3	21	36 : 104	7

=== Transylvania (North) ===
1	Székelyudvarhelyi Hargita	14	11	2	1	40 : 14	24
2	Marosvásárhelyi NMTK II.	14	7	3	4	45 : 16	17
3	Székelyföldi MÁV II.	14	8	1	5	40 : 21	17
4	Székelyudvarhelyi Csaba TE	14	6	3	5	21 : 15	15
5	Székelykeresztúri TE	14	6	1	7	41 : 32	13
6	Szászrégeni Turul SE	14	4	4	6	20 : 31	12
7	Marosvásárhelyi Attila II.	14	4	2	8	24 : 61	10
8	Marosvásárhelyi SE II.	14	1	2	11	12 : 53	4

=== Transylvania (South) ===
1	Sepsiszentgyörgyi SE	8	7	1	0	27 : 8	15
2	Sepsiszentgyörgyi Textil SE	8	4	1	3	11 : 19	9
3	Gyergyószentmiklósi SE	8	3	0	5	13 : 19	6
4	Kézdivásárhelyi Gábor Áron SE	8	2	1	5	7 : 4	5
5	Csíkszeredai TE	8	2	1	5	7 : 15	5

== See also ==
- 1943–44 Magyar Kupa
- 1943–44 Nemzeti Bajnokság I
- 1943–44 Nemzeti Bajnokság II
