= 1942–43 Nemzeti Bajnokság III =

Nemzeti Bajnokság III
- Season: 1942–43
- Champions: Újszegedi TC (Alföld); Komáromi AC (Buda); ÚRAK (Duna-Tisza Interfluve); Marosvásárhelyi Attila (Hargita, North); Székelyudvarhelyi Hargita (Hargita, South); Újpesti TE II (Mátra); Felten SC (Transdanubia); Munkácsi LSE (Upper-Tisza)
- Promoted: Újszegedi TC (Alföld); Komáromi AC (Buda); ÚRAK (Duna-Tisza Interfluve); Marosvásárhelyi Attila (Hargita, North); None (Hargita, South); Salgótarjáni SE (Mátra); Felten SC (Transdanubia); Munkácsi LSE (Upper-Tisza)

The 1942–43 Nemzeti Bajnokság III season was the third edition of the Nemzeti Bajnokság III.

== League tables ==
=== Alföld group ===
Pos	Teams	Pld	W	D	L	GF	GA	GD	Pts	Promotion or relegation
1	Újszegedi TC	26	21	1	4	105	30	75	43	Promotion to Nemzeti Bajnokság II
2	Bácska Szabadkai AC	26	15	3	8	52	44	8	33	
3	Békéscsabai MÁV SE	26	12	7	7	80	49	31	31	
4	Zombori SE	26	12	5	9	46	32	14	29	
5	Újvidéki VAK	26	9	9	8	57	34	23	27	
6	Temerini TC	26	12	2	12	51	30	21	26	
7	Bajai TISE	26	10	6	10	41	51	-10	26	
8	Mezőkövácsházi TE	26	10	5	11	63	69	-6	25	
9	Makói AK	26	9	6	11	58	63	-5	24	
10	Bezdáni SE	26	8	8	10	52	65	-13	24	
11	MOVE Zombori TK	26	7	7	12	39	51	-12	21	
12	MOVE Szabadkai SE	26	8	4	14	47	57	-10	20	
13	Bácsalmási MOVE TSE	26	5	9	12	37	83	-46	19	
14	Szentesi MÁV SE	26	6	4	16	25	95	-70	16	

=== Buda group ===
Pos	Teams	Pld	W	D	L	GF	GA	GD	Pts	Promotion or relegation
1	Komáromi AC	26	22	4	0	90	22	68	48	Promotion to Nemzeti Bajnokság II
2	Ferencvárosi TC II	26	19	3	4	113	32	81	41	
3	Székesfehérvári MÁV Előre SC	26	18	2	6	76	43	33	38	
4	Dorogi AC	26	17	3	6	95	38	57	37	
5	Komáromi FC	26	15	2	9	55	49	6	32	
6	Pesterzsébeti MTK	26	11	4	11	41	52	-11	26	
7	Várpalotai Unió	26	10	5	11	44	60	-16	25	
8	Váci SE	26	11	2	13	51	52	-1	24	
9	Lévai TE	26	9	4	13	45	60	-15	22	
10	Műegyetemi AFC	26	8	4	14	60	70	-10	20	
11	Ferencvárosi Törekvés SE	26	8	4	14	39	87	-48	20	
12	Csillaghegyi MOVE	26	7	4	15	42	68	-26	18	
13	Pesterzsébeti Rákóczi	26	4	3	19	23	104	-81	11	
14	Ercsi Eötvös SE 1	26	1	0	25	6	43	-37	2	Relegation to Megyei Bajnokság I

Note:

1. withdrew

=== Danube–Tisza Interfluve group ===
Pos	Teams	Pld	W	D	L	GF	GA	GD	Pts	Promotion or relegation
1	Újpest-Rákospalotai AK	26	19	4	3	99	34	65	42	Promotion to Nemzeti Bajnokság II
2	Ceglédi MOVE	26	17	5	4	99	47	52	39	
3	Jászberényi Lehel SE	26	13	4	9	66	40	26	30	
4	MOVE Rákosszentmihályi TSE	26	12	6	8	60	49	11	30	
5	MOVE PAETE	26	13	3	10	73	64	9	29	
6	Rákoscsabai TK	26	12	4	10	55	59	-4	28	
7	Ceglédi Vasutas SE	26	11	4	11	48	51	-3	26	
8	Fővárosi TK	26	11	2	13	70	65	5	24	
9	Monori MOVE	26	9	6	11	60	68	-8	24	
10	Rákoskeresztúri TE	26	10	3	13	44	60	-16	23	
11	Kecskeméti TE	26	10	1	15	53	80	-27	21	
12	Kecskeméti AC	26	7	5	14	46	75	-29	19	
13	Herminamezei AC	26	6	5	15	54	87	-33	17	
14	Nagykőrösi MOVE	26	3	4	19	45	93	-48	10	

=== Hargita (North) group ===
Pos	Teams	Pld	W	D	L	GF	GA	GD	Pts	Promotion or relegation
1	Marosvásárhelyi Attila	11	6	2	3	16	15	1	14	Promotion to Nemzeti Bajnokság II
2	Szászrégeni Turul	11	6	2	3	12	14	-2	14	
3	Marosvásárhelyi MÁV II.	10	6	1	3	28	14	14	13	
4	Marosvásárhelyi NMKTE II.	12	6	1	5	18	18	0	13	
5	Székelykeresztúri AC	11	5	1	5	14	29	-15	11	
6	Marosvásárhelyi SE II.	11	3	1	7	21	17	4	7	

=== Hargita (South) group ===
Pos	Teams	Pld	W	D	L	GF	GA	GD	Pts	Promotion or relegation
1	Székelyudvarhelyi Hargita	12	8	1	3	28	18	10	17	
2	Sepsiszentgyörgyi Textil SE	9	8	0	1	32	15	17	16	
3	Sepsiszentgyörgyi Korvin	10	5	2	3	17	16	1	12	
4	Csíkszeredai TE	11	4	2	5	12	14	-2	10	
5	Székelyudvarhelyi Csaba	11	3	2	6	15	24	-9	8	
6	Kézdivásárhelyi Gábor Áron SE	11	3	0	8	12	30	-18	6	
7	Komandói SE 1									

Notes:

1. withdrew

=== Mátra group ===
Pos	Teams	Pld	W	D	L	GF	GA	GD	Pts	Promotion or relegation
1	Újpesti TE II	26	22	1	3	128	32	96	43	
2	Weisz Manfréd TK II	26	18	2	6	110	37	73	38	
3	Salgótarjáni SE	26	17	2	7	73	49	24	36	Promotion to Nemzeti Bajnokság II
4	Soroksári AC	26	13	7	6	55	42	13	33	
5	Kistext FC	26	14	4	8	64	37	27	32	
6	Füleki VKSE	26	14	3	9	38	52	-14	31	
7	KamSE	26	11	3	12	57	73	-16	25	
8	Alberttelepi MÁVAG	26	9	6	11	38	55	-17	24	
9	Losoncapátfalva TSE	26	10	3	13	46	76	-30	23	
10	Hatvani VSE	26	9	4	13	32	57	-25	22	
11	MOVE Egri SE	26	8	5	13	46	69	-23	21	
12	Balassagyarmati TSE	26	6	6	14	29	74	-45	18	
13	Gyöngyösi AK	26	4	6	16	29	80	-51	14	
14	OeSC 1	26	1	0	25	8	20	-12	2	

Notes:

1. withdrew

=== Transdanubia group ===
Pos	Teams	Pld	W	D	L	GF	GA	GD	Pts	Promotion or relegation
1	Felten SC	26	17	4	5	80	43	37	38	Promotion to Nemzeti Bajnokság II
2	Dombovári Vasutas SE	26	14	6	6	72	57	15	34	
3	Pécsi BTC	26	13	6	7	68	44	24	32	
4	Csáktornyai Zrínyi SE	26	11	6	9	60	76	-16	28	
5	Wolfner SE	26	11	5	10	78	58	20	27	
6	Kaposvári Turul SE	26	10	7	9	60	55	5	27	
7	Nagymányoki SE	26	11	5	10	74	84	-10	27	
8	Kerámia SC	26	11	4	11	75	73	2	26	
9	Pécsi VSK	26	9	5	12	56	66	-10	23	
10	Magyar Acél SC	26	9	4	13	55	61	-6	22	
11	Magyar Posztógyári SE	26	7	8	11	56	73	-17	22	
12	Budapesti TK	26	9	3	14	58	64	-6	21	
13	Nagykanizsai VTE	26	7	6	13	45	70	-25	20	
14	Simontornyai BTC	26	6	5	15	52	65	-13	17	

=== Upper-Tisza group ===
Pos	Teams	Pld	W	D	L	GF	GA	GD	Pts	Promotion or relegation
1	Munkácsi LSE	26	21	3	2	106	32	74	45	Promotion to Nemzeti Bajnokság II
2	Aknaszlatinai Bányász TE	26	21	1	4	87	30	57	43	
3	MÁV Sátoraljaújhelyi AC	26	18	2	6	73	48	25	38	
4	Szatmári SE	26	14	5	7	61	48	13	33	
5	Nyíregyházi VSC	26	13	6	7	47	43	4	32	
6	Nagybányai Jószerencse SE	26	13	5	8	60	38	22	31	
7	Püspökladányi MÁV SK	26	8	8	10	63	43	20	24	
8	Nagybányai Petrozsény SE	26	8	7	11	45	51	-6	23	
9	Királyházi MÁV SE	26	7	6	13	50	65	-15	20	
10	Szatmári Vasutas SE	26	4	9	13	41	59	-18	17	
11	Beregszászi FTC	26	8	0	18	57	111	-54	16	
12	Szatmári Törekvés SE	26	5	6	16	36	73	-37	16	
13	Nagyszőlősi SE	26	5	4	17	42	80	-38	14	
14	Csapi SE	26	3	7	16	47	94	-47	13	

== See also ==
- 1942–43 Magyar Kupa
- 1942–43 Nemzeti Bajnokság I
- 1942–43 Nemzeti Bajnokság II
