= 1941–42 Nemzeti Bajnokság III =

Nemzeti Bajnokság III
- Season: 1941–42
- Country: Hungary
- Champions: WMTK II (Alföld); Marosvásárhelyi NMKTK (Hargita); Wekerletelepi SC (Mátra); Újpesti TE II (Transdanubia, North); Kaposvári Rákóczi AC (Transdanubia, South); Kassai VSC (Upper Hungary)

The 1941–42 Nemzeti Bajnokság III season was the second edition of the Nemzeti Bajnokság III.

== League tables ==
=== Alföld group ===
Pos	Teams	Pld	W	D	L	GF	GA	GD	Pts	Promotion or relegation
1	WMTK II	30	28	2	0	159	24	135	58	
2	Makói Vasutas SE	30	20	2	8	119	56	63	42	Promotion to Nemzeti Bajnokság II
3	Magyar Pamut SC	30	18	4	8	107	50	57	40	Promotion to Nemzeti Bajnokság II
4	Óbecsei Bocskai	30	15	6	9	73	41	32	36	Promotion to Nemzeti Bajnokság II
5	Békéscsabai Törekvés SE	30	13	5	12	71	70	1	31	Promotion to Nemzeti Bajnokság II
6	Topolyai SC	30	11	8	11	61	64	-3	30	Promotion to Nemzeti Bajnokság II
7	Szegedi TK	30	12	5	13	65	75	-10	29	Promotion to Nemzeti Bajnokság II
8	Szegedi EAC	30	12	3	15	74	87	-13	27	Promotion to Nemzeti Bajnokság II
9	Hódmezővásárhelyi TVE	30	12	3	15	53	93	-40	27	Promotion to Nemzeti Bajnokság II
10	Csabai AK	30	10	6	14	62	85	-23	26	Promotion to Nemzeti Bajnokság II
11	Újvidéki Vasutas AK	30	9	6	15	68	96	-28	24	
12	Kecskeméti AC	30	7	9	14	51	71	-20	23	
13	Bácska Szabadkai AC	30	8	6	16	61	103	-42	22	
14	MOVE Ceglédi TSE	30	10	2	18	44	80	-36	22	
15	Szentesi TE	30	8	5	17	52	103	-51	21	Relegation to Megyei Bajnokság I
16	Kulai AFC 1	30	9	4	17	48	70	-22	22	Relegation to Megyei Bajnokság I

=== Hargita group ===
Pos	Teams	Pld	W	D	L	GF	GA	GD	Pts	Promotion or relegation
1	Marosvásárhelyi NMKTK 1	22	18	2	2	75	20	55	38	Promotion to Nemzeti Bajnokság II
2	Székelyföldi MÁV	22	16	2	4	70	29	41	34	Promotion to Nemzeti Bajnokság II
3	Székelyudvarhelyi Hargita	22	16	2	4	48	22	26	34	
4	Sepsiszentgyörgyi Textil	22	12	2	8	44	48	-4	26	
5	Marosvásárhelyi SE II.	22	12	1	9	41	34	7	25	
6	Gyergyószentmiklósi SE	22	11	2	9	45	35	10	24	
7	Székelykeresztúri AC	22	9	4	9	37	32	5	22	
8	Székelyudvarhelyi Csaba	22	8	3	11	29	49	-20	19	
9	Kézdivásárhelyi Gábor Áron SE	22	6	4	12	35	36	-1	16	
10	Szászrégeni Turul	22	7	1	14	21	51	-30	15	
11	Sepsiszentgyörgyi Corvin SE	22	4	0	18	16	38	-22	8	
12	Csíkszeredai TE	22	1	1	20	25	92	-67	3	

Note:

1. The team started the season under the name PMTE Marosvásárhely, but changed its name during the season

=== Mátra group ===
Pos	Teams	Pld	W	D	L	GF	GA	GD	Pts	Promotion or relegation
1	Wekerletelepi SC	30	26	2	2	126	31	95	54	Promotion to Nemzeti Bajnokság II
2	Szentlőrinci AC	30	21	3	6	104	44	60	45	Promotion to Nemzeti Bajnokság II
3	Kőbányai TK	30	17	5	8	55	37	18	39	Promotion to Nemzeti Bajnokság II
4	Csepeli MOVE	30	17	2	11	79	41	38	36	Promotion to Nemzeti Bajnokság II
5	Hatvani Vasutas SE	30	16	4	10	69	49	20	36	
6	Losoncapátfalvai TSE	30	15	5	10	61	59	2	35	
7	Herminamezei AC	30	15	3	12	71	71	0	33	
8	Rákoskeresztúri TE	30	12	8	10	51	52	-1	32	
9	MOVE Egri SE	30	12	3	15	46	70	-24	27	
10	MOVE Rákosszentmihályi TSE	30	9	8	13	45	72	-27	26	
11	Gyöngyösi AK	30	11	4	15	44	76	-32	26	
12	Csillaghegyi MOVE	30	11	3	16	64	72	-8	25	
13	Jászberényi Lehel TK	30	10	3	17	41	75	-34	23	
14	Balassagyarmati TSE	30	8	5	17	48	91	-43	21	
15	Rákosligeti MOVE	30	6	4	20	46	94	-48	16	Relegation to Megyei Bajnokság I
16	Pálfalvai BÜSE 1	30	2	2	26	24	40	-16	6	Relegation to Megyei Bajnokság I

=== Transdanubia (north) ===
Pos	Teams	Pld	W	D	L	GF	GA	GD	Pts	Promotion or relegation
1	Újpesti TE II	22	14	4	4	80	38	42	32	
2	Pápai Perutz SC	22	15	1	6	69	38	31	31	Promotion to Nemzeti Bajnokság II
3	Alba Regia AK	22	12	5	5	67	57	10	29	Promotion to Nemzeti Bajnokság II
4	FTC (Ferencváros II.)	22	11	4	7	67	43	24	26	
5	Tatabányai SC	22	12	4	6	56	40	16	28	Promotion to Nemzeti Bajnokság II
6	ÁMOTE	22	12	2	8	56	43	13	26	Promotion to Nemzeti Bajnokság II
7	Dorogi AC	22	10	5	7	57	42	15	25	
8	Hubertus SE	22	7	5	10	59	61	-2	19	
9	PAETE	22	6	4	12	32	51	-19	16	Relegation to Megyei Bajnokság I
10	Váci SE	22	6	3	13	27	64	-37	15	
11	Váci Reménység	22	5	4	13	38	80	-42	14	Relegation to Megyei Bajnokság I
12	Budapesti Rákosmenti SC 1	22	1	1	20	22	73	-51	3	

Note:

1. withdrew

=== Transdanubia (south) ===
Pos	Teams	Pld	W	D	L	GF	GA	GD	Pts	Promotion or relegation
1	Kaposvári Rákóczi AC	20	13	5	2	64	27	37	31	Promotion to Nemzeti Bajnokság II
2	Kábelgyári SC	20	13	4	3	61	26	35	30	Promotion to Nemzeti Bajnokság II
3	Hangya SE	20	11	6	3	74	40	34	28	Promotion to Nemzeti Bajnokság II
4	Gázgyár	20	12	3	5	72	36	36	27	Promotion to Nemzeti Bajnokság II
5	Csáktornyai SC	20	8	4	8	36	36	0	20	Relegation to Megyei Bajnokság I
6	Kaposvári Turul SE	20	7	4	9	54	48	6	18	
7	Nagymányoki SE	20	8	2	10	57	63	-6	18	
8	Pesterzsébeti MTK	20	5	6	9	30	46	-16	16	
9	Zombori SE	20	5	6	9	41	61	-20	16	
10	Pécsi VSK	20	5	4	11	45	59	-14	14	
11	Apatini SE	20	0	2	18	12	104	-92	2	Relegation to Megyei Bajnokság I
12	Nemzeti SC 1	-	-	-	-	: -	-			Relegation to Megyei Bajnokság I

=== Upper Hungary ===
Pos	Teams	Pld	W	D	L	GF	GA	GD	Pts	Promotion or relegation
1	Kassai VSC	22	20	1	1	79	21	58	41	Promotion to Nemzeti Bajnokság II
2	Ungvári AC	22	19	0	3	106	18	88	38	Promotion to Nemzeti Bajnokság II
3	Királyházi MÁV	22	11	4	7	58	42	16	26	
4	Munkácsi LSE	22	11	2	9	51	53	-2	24	
5	MÁV Sátoraljaújhelyi AC	22	10	4	8	43	53	-10	24	
6	Aknaszlatinai Bányász TE	22	10	3	9	63	46	17	23	
7	Nyíregyházi Vasutas SC	22	8	4	10	40	66	-26	20	
8	Beregszászi FTC	22	6	7	9	33	57	-24	19	
9	Nagyszőllősi SE	22	8	2	12	23	50	-27	18	
10	Nagykárolyi AC	22	7	4	11	21	57	-36	18	
11	Nyíregyházi KISE	22	4	0	18	18	30	-12	8	Relegation to Megyei Bajnokság I
12	Várpalánkai Turul SE	22	1	3	18	13	55	-42	5	Relegation to Megyei Bajnokság I

== See also ==
- 1941–42 Magyar Kupa
- 1941–42 Nemzeti Bajnokság I
- 1941–42 Nemzeti Bajnokság II
