= 1942–43 OB I bajnoksag season =

Hungarian ice hockey season

The 1942–43 OB I bajnokság season was the seventh season of the OB I bajnokság, the top level of ice hockey in Hungary. Four teams participated in the final round, and BBTE Budapest won the championship.

== First round ==
=== Gruppe Budapest ===
- BBTE Budapest and BKE Budapest qualified for final round, Ferencvárosi TC failed to qualify.

=== Felvidék Group ===
	Club	GP	W	T	L	Goals	Pts
1.	Kassai VSC	2	2	0	0	11:2	4
2.	Kassai RAC	2	1	0	1	5:7	2
3.	Ungvári AC	2	0	0	2	3:10	0

=== Erdély Group ===
- Marosvásárhelyi SE and Kolozsvári KE qualified for final round.

== Final round ==
=== Semifinals ===
- BBTE Budapest - Marosvásárhelyi SE 5:4
- BKE Budapest - Kolozsvári KE 2:0

=== Final ===
- BBTE Budapest - BKE Budapest
