= Sepsiszentgyörgyi SE =

Hungarian football club

- Full name: Sepsiszentgyörgyi Sportegylet
- Founded: 1937
- Dissolved: 1945
Home colours

Sepsiszentgyörgyi Sportegylet is a defunct professional football club based in Sfântu Gheorghe (in Hungarian: Sepsiszentgyörgy), Romania.

== History ==
During World War II, Hungary gained back some of its lost territories due to the Treaty of Trianon. Hungary could also gain back Northern Transylvania; therefore, football clubs in Sfântu Gheorghe could participate in the Hungarian league system.

Sepsiszentgyörgyi SE entered the Hungarian league system in 1940 as Sepsiszentgyörgyi Corvin. The club finished in the fourth position in the Southern Transylvania group of the 1940–41 Nemzeti Bajnokság III season. In the following season, Sepsiszentgyörgyi SE entered the third division. The club finished in the 11th position of the Hargita group of the 1941–42 Nemzeti Bajnokság III season.

== Honours ==
=== League ===
- Nemzeti Bajnokság III:
  - Winners (1): 1943–44

== Seasons ==
The highest league that Sepsiszentgyörgyi SE have ever played was the third division.

Season	Tier	Club's name	Position	Pts
1940–41	2	Sepsiszentgyörgyi Corvin	4 / 5	6
1941–42	3	Sepsiszentgyörgyi Corvin SE	11 / 12	8
1942–43	3	Sepsiszentgyörgyi Korvin	3 / 7	12
1943–44	3	Sepsiszentgyörgyi SE	1 / 5	15
1944–45	2	Sepsiszentgyörgyi SE	0 / 5	
1944–45	2	Sepsiszentgyörgyi SE	0 / 11	
