= 1940–41 Nemzeti Bajnokság III =

Nemzeti Bajnokság III
- Season: 1940–41
- Country: Hungary
- Champions: Újpesti TE II (West); Nyíregyházi TVE (North, Carpathian); Losonci AFC (North, Mátra); Goldberger SE (South); Ferencvárosi TC II (East)

The 1940–41 Nemzeti Bajnokság III season was the first edition of the Nemzeti Bajnokság III.

== League tables ==
=== Western group ===
Pos	Teams	Pld	W	D	L	GF	GA	GD	Pts	Promotion or relegation
1	Újpesti TE II	22	19	2	1	83	26	57	40	
2	Hungária SC	22	15	4	3	70	30	40	34	Promotion to Nemzeti Bajnokság II
3	Érsekújvári SE	22	13	2	7	66	28	38	28	Promotion to Nemzeti Bajnokság II
4	Dorogi AC	22	10	5	7	45	39	6	25	
5	Csepeli MOVE	22	10	4	8	56	48	8	24	
6	Pápai PSC	22	9	4	9	60	48	12	22	
7	Tatabánya SC	22	10	2	10	49	47	2	22	
8	Szentlőrinci AC	22	9	3	10	49	52	-3	21	
9	Alba Regia AK	22	7	4	11	62	81	-19	18	
10	MOVE Csillaghegyi TSE	22	5	3	14	32	83	-51	13	
11	Komáromi FC	22	4	2	16	21	58	-37	10	Relegation to Megyei Bajnokság I
12	MOVE Budakalászi TSE	22	2	3	17	29	82	-53	7	Relegation to Megyei Bajnokság I

=== Northern (Kárpát) group ===
Pos	Teams	Pld	W	D	L	GF	GA	GD	Pts	Promotion or relegation
1	Nyíregyházi TVE	18	16	1	1	55	18	37	33	Promotion to Nemzeti Bajnokság II
2	Munkácsi SE	18	12	2	4	51	30	21	26	
3	Ungvári AC	18	11	2	5	43	21	22	24	
4	Kassai Törekvés	18	10	2	6	42	32	10	22	
5	Beregszászi FTC	18	10	0	8	45	29	16	20	
6	Nyíregyházi KISE	16	8	4	4	31	33	-2	20	
7	Aknaszlatinai BTE	17	6	2	9	19	38	-19	14	
8	Várpalánkai Turul SE	17	4	1	12	10	51	-41	9	
9	Nagyszőllősi Beszkid	18	2	0	16	19	39	-20	4	Relegation to Megyei Bajnokság I
10	Ungvári MTE 1	18	2	0	16	4	28	-24	4	Relegation to Megyei Bajnokság I

=== Northern (Mátra) group ===
Pos	Teams	Pld	W	D	L	GF	GA	GD	Pts	Promotion or relegation
1	Losonci AFC	18	12	4	2	39	20	19	28	Promotion to Nemzeti Bajnokság II
2	Hatvani Vasutas SE	18	12	3	3	45	19	26	27	
3	DiMÁVAG II.	18	11	3	4	77	30	47	25	
4	Pálfalvai BÜSE	18	9	4	5	37	38	-1	22	
5	III. ker. Árpád SE	18	9	3	6	27	26	1	21	
6	Pesterzsébeti MTK	18	5	6	7	40	35	5	16	
7	Salgótarjáni BTC II.	18	6	3	9	28	39	-11	15	
8	MOVE Egri SE	18	4	4	10	25	37	-12	12	
9	Gyöngyösi AK	18	1	6	11	21	66	-45	8	
10	Hálókocsi	18	1	4	13	21	50	-29	6	Relegation to Megyei Bajnokság I

=== Southern group ===
Pos	Teams	Pld	W	D	L	GF	GA	GD	Pts	Promotion or relegation
1	Goldberger SE	22	15	3	4	70	25	45	33	Promotion to Nemzeti Bajnokság II
2	BRSC	22	15	2	5	66	41	25	32	
3	Kőbányai TK	22	14	3	5	43	22	21	31	
4	Törekvés SE II.	22	11	3	8	66	44	22	25	
5	Nemzeti SC	22	10	5	7	42	39	3	25	
6	Pécsi VSK	22	11	1	10	62	42	20	23	
7	Magyar Pamut SC	22	9	5	8	46	41	5	23	
8	Rákoskeresztúri TE	22	7	4	11	55	67	-12	18	
9	Kaposvári Turul SE	22	7	3	12	35	51	-16	17	
10	Nagymányoki SE	22	8	0	14	55	68	-13	16	
11	Bajai Türr István SE	22	6	3	13	38	76	-38	15	Relegation to Megyei Bajnokság I
12	Kiskunhalasi AC	22	1	4	17	16	78	-62	6	Relegation to Megyei Bajnokság I

Notes:

1. Kiskunhalas did not show up for the matches against NSC - Kiskunhalas and BRSC - Kiskunhalas; the opposing teams were awarded the 2 points with a score of 0-0.

=== Eastern group ===
Pos	Teams	Pld	W	D	L	GF	GA	GD	Pts	Promotion or relegation
1	Ferencvárosi TC II	22	19	2	1	126	24	102	40	
2	WMTK II	22	14	4	4	81	27	54	32	
3	Testvériség SE	22	15	1	6	65	34	31	31	Promotion to Nemzeti Bajnokság II
4	Kecskeméti AC	22	8	8	6	58	54	4	24	
5	Csabai AK	22	9	2	11	46	66	-20	20	
6	Szentesi TE	22	7	6	9	49	71	-22	20	
7	Szegedi AK II.	22	7	5	10	57	61	-4	19	
8	Hódmezővásárhelyi TVE	22	9	1	12	61	70	-9	19	
9	Szolnoki MÁV II.	22	6	5	11	32	47	-15	17	
10	Ceglédi MOVE	22	6	5	11	33	81	-48	17	
11	Gyulai AC	22	4	5	13	40	78	-38	13	Relegation to Megyei Bajnokság I
12	Orosházi TK	22	2	8	12	32	67	-35	12	Relegation to Megyei Bajnokság I

Notes:

1. Mezőtúr AFC withdrew after two rounds; its results were voided, and the Cegléd MOVE team was entered in its place. The Mezőtúr matches from the first two rounds were replayed.

== Group final ==
Group final between the winners of North Carpathian and Mátra subgroups
Team	Result	Team
Nyíregyházi TVE	1–3	Losonci AFC
Losonci AFC	3–2	Nyíregyházi TVE

== See also ==
- 1940–40 Magyar Kupa
- 1940–41 Nemzeti Bajnokság I
- 1940–41 Nemzeti Bajnokság II
