= Magyar Kábel SC =

Hungarian football club

- Full name: Magyar Kábel Sport Club
- Founded: 1928
- Dissolved: 1998
- Ground: Hengermalom út (Újbuda)
Home colours

Magyar Kábel Sport Cclub is a defunct professional football club based in Budapest, Hungary.

== History ==
Magyar Kábel SC was funded in 1927 as Felten Sport Club in Budapest.

Magyar Kábel SC won the Transdanubia group of the 1942–43 Nemzeti Bajnokság III season and gained promotion to the second division. In their first season, 1943–44 Nemzeti Bajnokság II, Felten finished in the 13th position. The following season, 1944–45 Nemzeti Bajnokság II, was suspended due to World War II.

Magyar Kábel gained promotion to the third division by winning the 1987–88 Megyei Bajnokság, fourth division, season. In the 1988–89 Nemzeti Bajnokság III, Magyar Kábel finished in the 12th position. However, Magyar Kábel finished in the 14th position and were relegated after the 1989–90 Nemzeti Bajnokság III season.

== Name changes ==
- Felten Sport Club: 1927 – 1951
- Vasas Felten SK: 1951 – 1953
- Vasas Budapesti Kábelgyár: 1953 – 1957
- Budapesti Kábel SC: 1957 – ?
- Magyar Kábel SC: ? – 1998

== Honours ==
=== League ===
- Nemzeti Bajnokság III:
  - Winners (1): 1942–43
- Megyei Bajnokság I:
  - Winners (1): 1987–88

== Seasons ==
The highest league that Magyar Kábel SC have ever played was the third division.

Season	Tier	Club's name	Position	Pts
1997–98	5	Magyar Kábel SC	9 / 16	41
1996–97	4	Magyar Kábel	5 / 16	51
1995–96	4	Magyar Kábel SC	4 / 16	57
1994–95	4	Magyar Kábel SC	10 / 16	39
1993–94	4	Magyar Kábel	12 / 16	23
1992–93	4	Magyar Kábel SC	8 / 16	24
1991–92	4	Magyar Kábel	15 / 16	24
1990–91	4	Magyar Kábel SC	4 / 16	34
1989–90	3	Magyar Kábel SC	15 / 16	17
1988–89	3	Magyar Kábel	12 / 16	38
1987–88	4	Magyar Kábel	1 / 16	51
1986–87	4	Magyar Kábel	7 / 16	32
1985–86	4	Magyar Kábel	8 / 16	29
1983–84	5	Magyar Kábel	2 / 16	46
1982–83	5	Magyar Kábel SC	2 / 16	40
1981–82	5	Magyar Kábel	2 / 16	45
1980–81	5	Magyar Kábel	2 / 16	44
1979–80	4	Magyar Kábelgyár	13 / 16	21
1978–79	5	Magyar Kábel	1 / 16	47
1977–78	6	Magyar Kábel	2 / 16	44
1974–75	6	Magyar Kábel SC	0 / 16	
1973–74	5	Magyar Kábel	14 / 16	20
1972–73	5	Magyar Kábel	7 / 16	26
1971–72	5	Magyar Kábel SC	13 / 16	24
1970–71	4	Magyar Kábelgyár SC	15 / 16	20
1970 tavasz	4	Magyar Kábelgyár SC	16 / 16	7
1969	4	Magyar Kábel SC	6 / 16	31
1968	4	Magyar Kábel SC	7 / 16	33
1967	4	Magyar Kábel SC	10 / 16	28
1966	5	Magyar Kábel	3 / 14	35
1965	4	Magyar Kábel	13 / 16	22
1964	5	Magyar Kábel	1 / 16	45
1963 ősz	5	Magyar Kábel	11 / 16	14
1962–63	4	Budapesti Kábel	9 / 16	28
1961–62	4	Budapesti Kábelgyár	8 / 16	29
1960–61	4	Budapesti Kábelgyár	8 / 16	33
1959–60	5	Budapesti Kábel	1 / 16	48
1958–59	5	Bp. Kábel	12 / 16	10
1957–58	5	Bp. Kábel SC	6 / 16	34
1956	4	Budapesti Kábel SC	12 / 17	26
1955	3	Vasas Budapesti Kábel	14 / 16	14
1954	3	Budapesti Kábelgyár	12 / 16	22
1953	3	Vasas Budapesti Kábelgyár	11 / 16	22
1952	3	Vasas Felten	8 / 14	25
1951	4	Vasas Felten	2 / 12	
1950 ősz	5	Felten SC	1 / 16	26
1949–50	5	Felten SC	8 / 16	34
1948–49	5	Felten SC	7 / 16	35
1947–48	5	Felten SC	3 / 16	43
1946–47	5	Felten SC	12 / 16	25
1944–45	2	Felten SC	7 / 16	10
1944–45	2	Felten SC	0 / 12	
1943–44	2	Felten SC	13 / 16	24
1942–43	3	Felten SC	1 / 14	38
1941–42	4	Felten SC	5 / 14	30
1940–41	4	Felten SC	2 / 13	35
1939–40	3	Felten SC	10 / 14	22
1938–39	3	Felten SC	8 / 14	22
1937–38	3	Felten SC	2 / 14	40
1936–37	4	Felten SC	1 / 16	45
1935–36	4	Felten SC	7 / 12	22
1934–35	3	Felten SC	13 / 15	21
1933–34	3	Felten SC	10 / 14	20
1932–33	3	Felten SC	12 / 14	16
1931–32	4	Felten SC	1 / 16	49
1930–31	4	Felten SC	9 / 15	26
1929–30	4	Felten SC	4 / 12	27
1928–29	5	Felten SC	2 / 12	37

== Notable players ==
- (Hungary) Attila Kovács
- (Hungary) Béla Várady
