= Kassai VSC =

Hungarian football club

- Full name: Kassai Vasutas Sport Club
- Founded: 1940
- Ground: Deák Ferenc körúti pálya
Home colours

Kassai Vasutas Sport Club is a defunct professional football club based in Košice (in Hungarian: Kassa), Slovakia.

== History ==
Thanks to the First Vienna Award, Kassa (in Slovak: Košice) belonged to Hungary again. The club was registered by the Hungarian Football Federation. The club could enter the Hungarian league system at their level, Nemzeti Bajnokság III.

Kassai VSC won the Upper-Hungary group of the 1941–42 Nemzeti Bajnokság III season and gained promotion to the second division. In their first season, they finished in the 11th position in the 1942–43 Nemzeti Bajnokság II season and thus they were relegated back to the third division. After their return to the third division, Kassai VSC won the third division again, by finishing in the first position of the Transcarpathia group of the 1943–44 Nemzeti Bajnokság III season. The following season was suspended due to World War II.

== Honours ==
=== League ===
- Nemzeti Bajnokság III:
  - Winners (2): 1941–42, 1943–44

== Seasons ==
The highest league that Kassai VSC have ever played was the second division.

| Season | Tier | Club's name | Position | Pts |
|---|---|---|---|---|
| 1944–45 | 2 | Kassai Vasutas SC | 1 / 11 | 10 |
| 1944–45 | 2 | Kassai VSC | 0 / 10 | |
| 1943–44 | 3 | Kassai Vasutas SC | 1 / 11 | 38 |
| 1942–43 | 2 | Kassai Vasutas SC | 11 / 12 | 19 |
| 1941–42 | 3 | Kassai Vasutas SC | 1 / 12 | 41 |
