= 1943–44 Nemzeti Bajnokság II =

Nemzeti Bajnokság II
- Season: 1943–44
- Champions: MÁVAG SK (West); Ungvári AC (North); Szentlőrinci AC (East); Szegedi AK (South)
- Promoted: None

The 1943–44 Nemzeti Bajnokság II season was the 44th edition of the Nemzeti Bajnokság II.

== League table ==
=== Western group ===
Pos	Team	Pld	W	D	L	GF	GA	GD	Pts
1	MÁVAG SK	30	19	6	5	79	50	+29	44
2	Győri ETO	30	18	7	5	88	41	+47	43
3	Szombathelyi Haladás VSE	30	17	9	4	85	48	+37	43
4	Kaposvári Rákóczi AC	30	16	6	8	76	51	+25	38
5	Alba Regia AK	30	14	10	6	74	56	+18	38
6	Soproni VSE	30	17	2	11	77	45	+32	36
7	Pápai Perutz SC	30	12	7	11	75	80	−5	31
8	Tatabányai SC	30	11	7	12	54	47	+7	29
9	Újpest-Rákospalotai AK	30	11	5	14	62	76	−14	27
10	MOVE Érsekújvári SE	30	10	6	14	67	72	−5	26
11	Pécsi DVAC	30	10	5	15	59	86	−27	25
12	Komáromi AC	30	11	3	16	50	65	−15	25
13	Felten SC	30	10	4	16	56	76	−20	24
14	Szombathelyi FC	30	10	3	17	56	67	−11	23
15	Magyar Pamut SC	30	7	3	20	46	83	−37	17
16	Tokodi ÜSC	30	5	1	24	43	104	−61	11

=== Northern group ===
Pos	Team	Pld	W	D	L	GF	GA	GD	Pts
1	Ungvári AC	26	18	3	5	58	36	+22	39
2	Salgótarjáni SE	26	13	5	8	57	51	+6	31
3	Losonci AFC	26	13	2	11	60	50	+10	28
4	Rusj SK	26	13	2	11	48	40	+8	28
5	Dunakeszi Magyarság	26	12	4	10	47	41	+6	28
6	Ózdi VTK	26	12	3	11	53	55	−2	27
7	Gázgyár	26	12	2	12	59	55	+4	26
8	Perecesi TK	26	11	4	11	46	57	−11	26
9	Csepeli MOVE	26	11	3	12	51	47	+4	25
10	Testvériség	26	10	4	12	54	61	−7	24
11	Miskolci Vasutas SC	26	9	5	12	49	48	+1	23
12	Munkácsi LSE	26	9	3	14	44	63	−19	21
13	Pénzügyi TSC	26	9	2	15	44	56	−12	20
14	Kassai RAC	26	6	6	14	40	50	−10	18

=== Eastern group ===
Pos	Team	Pld	W	D	L	GF	GA	GD	Pts
1	Szentlőrinci AC	26	17	4	5	64	36	+28	38
2	Nagybányai SE	26	13	7	6	61	28	+33	33
3	Törekvés SE	26	14	5	7	71	36	+35	33
4	Kábelgyári SC (KáSC)	26	14	4	8	43	34	+9	32
5	Székelyföldi MÁV (Marosvásárhely)	26	13	6	7	39	33	+6	32
6	Marosvásárhelyi NMKTE	26	14	4	8	51	47	+4	32
7	Budapesti Vasutas SC	26	14	3	9	65	48	+17	31
8	Marosvásárhelyi SE	26	10	9	7	51	32	+19	29
9	Bethlen Gábor SE (Budapest)	26	13	1	12	39	43	−4	27
10	Hungária SC (Budapest)	26	9	3	14	46	54	−8	21
11	Kolozsvári MÁV	26	7	7	12	39	49	−10	21
12	Kolozsvári Bástya	26	9	3	14	49	68	−19	21
13	Kolozsvári Egyetemi AC (KEAC)	26	5	4	17	45	80	−35	14
14	Marosvásárhelyi Attila	26	0	0	26	6	81	−75	0

=== Southern group ===
Pos	Team	Pld	W	D	L	GF	GA	GD	Pts
1	Szegedi AK	28	23	3	2	137	34	+103	49
2	Ganz TE	28	20	3	5	74	38	+36	43
3	Zuglói Danuvia SE	28	18	4	6	75	34	+41	40
4	Szabadkai VAK	28	18	2	8	87	42	+45	38
5	OTE III. ker. (ÁMOTE)	28	15	4	9	69	44	+25	34
6	Makói VSE	28	15	2	11	60	49	+11	32
7	Lampart FC (Fegyvergyár)	28	12	7	9	56	38	+18	31
8	Wekerletelepi SC	28	10	6	12	38	47	−9	26
9	Zentai AK	28	10	4	14	52	64	−12	24
10	Hódmezővásárhelyi TVE	28	10	2	16	40	76	−36	22
11	Békéscsabai Törekvés SE	28	8	2	18	44	83	−39	18
12	Újszegedi TC	28	7	4	17	35	59	−24	18
13	Óbecsei Bocskai	28	7	4	17	33	65	−32	18
14	Újverbászi CSE	28	4	6	18	28	92	−64	14
15	Topolyai SE	28	5	3	20	26	89	−63	13

== See also ==
- 1943–44 Magyar Kupa
- 1943–44 Nemzeti Bajnokság I
