= 1940–41 OB I bajnoksag season =

Hungarian ice hockey season

The 1940–41 OB I bajnokság season was the fifth season of the OB I bajnokság, the top level of ice hockey in Hungary. Teams first participated in regional groups. Three teams participated in the final round, and BBTE Budapest won the championship.

== First round ==
=== Budapest Group ===
	Club	GP	W	T	L	Goals	Pts
1.	BBTE Budapest	4	2	2	0	8:6	6
2.	Ferencvárosi TC	4	0	4	0	5:5	4
3.	BKE Budapest	4	0	2	2	5:7	2

=== North Group ===
Won by Kassai AC.

=== Székelyföld Group ===
	Club
1.	Marosvásárhelyi SE
2.	Csíkszereda

=== Kolozsvár Group ===
Won by Kolozsvári KE.

== Final round ==
	Club	GP	W	T	L	Goals	Pts
1.	BBTE Budapest	2	2	0	0	13:3	4
2.	Kolozsvári KE	2	1	0	1	3:9	2
3.	Marosvásárhelyi SE	2	0	0	2	3:7	0
