= Losonci AFC =

Hungarian football club

Losonci Atlétikai és Football Club
- Full name: Losonci Atlétikai és Football Club
- Founded: 1902
Home colours

Losonci Atlétikai és Football Club (or FK LAFC Lučenec) is a defunct professional football club based in Lučenec (in Hungarian: Losonc), Slovakia.

== History ==
Thanks to the First Vienna Award, Losonc (in Slovak: Lučenec) belonged to Hungary again. The club was registered by the Hungarian Football Federation. The club could enter the Hungarian league system at their level, Nemzeti Bajnokság III.

On 1 October 1939, Losonci AFC played a friendly match with Ferencvárosi TC in Losonc in front of 600 spectators. The starting lineup included Kósa, Toltnácsi, Bukovszky, Radó, Molnár, Kostyál, Lukács, Hegedűs II, Hegedűs I, Sós, and Trenka. Before the match, Károly Pálos, the notary of Losonc, greeted the players.

Losonci AFC won the Northern group of the 1940–41 Nemzeti Bajnokság III season and gained promotion to the second division. The club spent four consecutive years in the second division. In the 1943–44 Nemzeti Bajnokság II season the club reached its best position a third place. Only Ungvári AC and Salgótarjáni SE could overtake Losonc on the table. The following season was suspended due to World War II.

== Honours ==
=== League ===
- Nemzeti Bajnokság III:
  - Winners (1): 1940–41

== Seasons ==
The table below shows the seasons of Losonci AFC.

Season	Tier	Club's name	Position	Pts
1912–13	2	Losonci AC	2 / 7	19
1913–14	2	Losonci AC	1 / 5	14
1938–39	3	Losonci AFC	1 / 9	
1939–40	2	Losonci AFC	13 / 16	17
1940–41	3	Losonci AFC	1 / 10	28
1941–42	2	Losonci AFC	10 / 14	24
1942–43	2	Losonci AFC	9 / 12	21
1943–44	2	Losonci AFC	3 / 14	28
1944–45	2	Losonci AFC	0 / 15	
1944–45	2	Losonci AFC	0 / 12	

== Notable players ==
Players that played for a national football team.

- Lajos Korányi
