= Kassa =

Kassa may refer to:

== Places ==
- Kassa (Bithynia), a place in ancient Bithynia, Anatolia
- Kassa, Mali, a commune
- Kassa Dam, in Japan
- Kassa Island, in the group of Îles de Los near Guinea
- Košice (Hungarian: Kassa), a city in Slovakia

== People ==
- Kassa (name), a given and surname
- Kassa (mansa), a ruler of the Mali Empire in 1360
- Kassa of Kwara or Tewodros II (c. 1818–1868), Emperor of Ethiopia
- Kassa Overall, an American musician

== Television ==
- Kassa (TV program), a Dutch consumer protection TV program
- "Kassa" (Andor), the series premiere episode of Andor
  - Cassian Andor, the title character whose given name is Kassa

== Other uses ==
- Keeping All Students Safe Act (KASSA), legislative proposals introduced in 2011 in the United States Congress
- Bombing of Kassa, in 1941 Kassa Hungary

== See also ==
- Ylinen Kassa, a village in Sweden
- Kasa (disambiguation)
- Casa (disambiguation)
