= Ylinen =

Ylinen may refer to:

== People ==
- Johanna Ylinen (born 1984), Finnish judoka
- Vesa Ylinen (born 1965), Finnish motorcycle speedway rider

== Other uses ==
- Ylinen Kassa, village in Sweden
