= Désiré Koranyi =

Hungarian-French footballer (1914–1981)

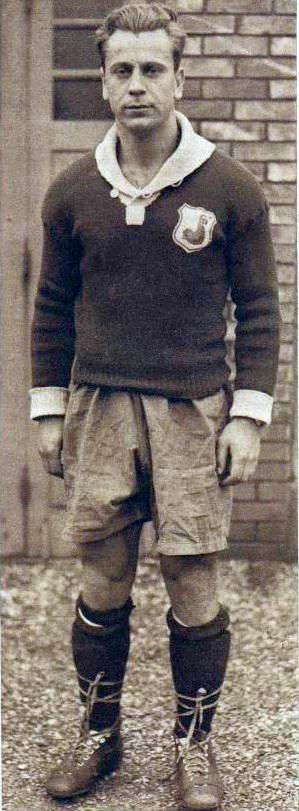

Personal information
- Date of birth: 28 January 1914
- Place of birth: Szeged, Austria-Hungary
- Date of death: 9 January 1981 (aged 66)
- Position: Striker

Senior career*
Years	Team	Apps	(Gls)
1934–1935	Kecskeméti AC		
1935–1950	FC Sète	252	(157)
1950–1951	AC Arles		
1951–1952	Montpellier	20	(6)
1952–1955	ESA Brive		
1955–1956	FC Sète	5	(1)
Total		277	(164)

International career
1939–1942	France	5	(5)

Managerial career
- 1950–1951: AC Arles
- 1952–1955: ESA Brive
- 1955–1956: FC Sète
- 1958–1959: Metz
- 1962–1964: ESA Brive
- * Club domestic league appearances and goals

Désiré Koranyi (28 January 1914 – 9 January 1981), a.k.a. Dezsõ Korányi or Dezsõ Kronenberger, was a Hungarian-French footballer. He played club soccer most notably with FC Sète where he won the Division 1 in 1938-39. He was capped five times for France, scoring five goals. He then enjoyed a coaching career with FC Sète and Metz.

He had two brothers who were also footballers: Lajos Korányi and Mátyás Korányi. Désiré played for FC Sète for 15 years and scored 174 goals in 196 games.
