= Hargita TE =

Hungarian football club

- Full name: Hargita TE
- Founded: 1921
Home colours

Hargita Testedző Egylet is a defunct professional football club based in Odorheiu Secuiesc (in Hungarian: Székelyudvarhely), Romania.

== History ==
Thanks to the First Vienna Award, Szekélyudvarhely (in Romanian: Odorheiu Secuiesc) belonged to Hungary again. The club was registered by the Hungarian Football Federation. The club could enter the Hungarian league system at the second level, Nemzeti Bajnokság II.

Hargita TE finished in the fourth place of the Northern Székelyföld group of the 1940–41 Nemzeti Bajnokság II season. In the following season, Hargita entered the third division and finished in the third place of the Hargita group of the 1941–42 Nemzeti Bajnokság III season. Hargita won the Southern Hargita group of the 1942–43 Nemzeti Bajnokság III season, although the club did not gain promotion to the second division. Hargita repeated their success in the following season by winning the Northern Székelyföld group of the 1943–44 Nemzeti Bajnokság III season. This time Hargita Te also gained promotion to the second division; however, the following season was suspended due to World War II.

== Honours ==
=== League ===
- Nemzeti Bajnokság III:
  - Winners (2): 1942–43, 1943–44

== Seasons ==
The table below shows the seasons of Hargita TE.

Season	Tier	Club's name	Position	Pts
1940–41	2	Székelyudvarhelyi Hargita	4 / 5	6
1941–42	3	Székelyudvarhelyi Hargita	3 / 12	34
1942–43	3	Székelyudvarhelyi Hargita	1 / 7	17
1943–44	3	Székelyudvarhelyi Hargita	1 / 8	24
1944–45	2	Székelyudvarhelyi Hargita	0 / 8	
1944–45	2	Székelyudvarhelyi Hargita	0 / 11	
