= Shadirac Chyreme Say =

Ghanaian footballer (born 2004)

Personal information
- Date of birth: 23 April 2004 (age 22)
- Place of birth: Accra, Ghana
- Height: 1.91 m (6 ft 3 in)
- Position: Centre-back

Team information
- Current team: AC Oulu (on loan from Ferencváros II)
- Number: 75

Youth career
- EurAfrica FC

Senior career*
Years	Team	Apps	(Gls)
2023–	Ferencváros	0	(0)
2023–2025	→ Soroksár (loan)	27	(0)
2025–	→ AC Oulu (loan)	9	(0)
- * Club domestic league appearances and goals as of 20 November 2025

Shadirac Chyreme Say (born 23 April 2004) is a Ghanaian professional footballer who plays as a centre-back for Finnish Veikkausliiga club AC Oulu, on loan from Hungarian Ferencváros II.

== Club career ==
In 2023, Say left his native Ghana when he transferred from EurAfrica Academy to Hungarian club Ferencváros, initially on loan. During 2023–2025, he also played for Soroksár in second-tier Nemzeti Bajnokság II.

On 10 July 2025, he was loaned out to Finnish Veikkausliiga club AC Oulu.
