= Mátyás Korányi =

Hungarian footballer

Personal information
- Date of birth: 1910
- Place of birth: Austria-Hungary

Senior career*
Years	Team	Apps	(Gls)
1937–1939	Olympique Lillois	?	(?)
Total		?	(?)

International career
1932–1935	Hungary	4	(0)
- * Club domestic league appearances and goals

Mátyás Korányi (also known as Mátyás Kronenberger; born 1910) was a Hungarian international footballer who played professionally in France for Olympique Lillois. His two brothers Désiré and Lajos were also footballers.
