= 1941–42 Nemzeti Bajnokság II =

Nemzeti Bajnokság II
- Season: 1941–42
- Champions: Szombathelyi Haladás VSE (Zrínyi); Vasas SC (Rákóczi); Törekvés SE (Mátyás)

The 1941–42 Nemzeti Bajnokság II season was the 42nd edition of the Nemzeti Bajnokság II. In this season, three groups were created and named after Hungarian historical figures: Miklós Zrínyi, Ferenc II Rákóczi, and Mátyás Hunyadi.

== League table ==
=== Zrínyi group ===
Pos	Team	Pld	W	D	L	GF	GA	GD	Pts	Promotion or relegation
1	Szombathelyi Haladás VSE	26	17	5	4	94	42	+52	39	Promotion to Nemzeti Bajnokság I
2	Szombathelyi FC	26	18	3	5	81	45	+36	39	
3	Soproni VSE	26	16	5	5	84	49	+35	37	
4	Egyetértés TO	26	17	2	7	108	39	+69	36	
5	Érsekújvári SE-Cikta	26	15	4	7	68	47	+21	34	
6	Pécsi DVAC	26	12	6	8	71	52	+19	30	
7	Tokodi ÜSC	26	14	1	11	82	58	+24	29	
8	Pénzügyi TSC	26	10	7	9	59	50	+9	27	
9	Soproni FAC	26	10	5	11	66	64	+2	25	
10	Szabadkai Vasutas AK	26	9	5	12	69	56	+13	23	
11	Zentai AK	26	6	4	16	50	97	−47	16	
12	Újverbászi CSE	26	6	3	17	42	86	−44	15	
13	Bezdáni SE	26	3	4	19	38	110	−72	10	Relegation
14	Szabadkai Sport	26	1	2	23	15	132	−117	4	Relegation

=== Rákóczi group ===
Pos	Team	Pld	W	D	L	GF	GA	GD	Pts	Promotion or relegation
1	Vasas SC	26	18	6	2	62	20	+42	42	Promotion to Nemzeti Bajnokság I
2	BSzKRT SE	26	18	5	3	99	32	+67	41	
3	BVSC	26	16	3	7	58	38	+20	35	
4	Miskolci VSC	26	12	6	8	51	43	+8	30	
5	MOVE Ózdi VTK	26	12	4	10	56	55	+1	28	
6	Budapesti LK	26	12	4	10	54	54	0	28	
7	SK Rusj Ungvár	26	12	3	11	51	64	−13	27	
8	Kassai Rákóczi AC (Note: Kassai AC merged with Rákóczi SE.)	26	10	6	10	45	55	−10	26	
9	Testvériség SE	26	11	3	12	48	61	−13	25	
10	Losonci AFC	26	9	6	11	41	46	−5	24	
11	Perecesi TK	26	9	4	13	55	55	0	22	
12	Hungária SC	26	9	3	14	48	64	−16	21	
13	Salgótarjáni SE	26	7	1	18	39	74	−35	15	Relegation
14	Kassai Rákóczi SE (Note: Dissolved due to the merger with Kassai AC. The points were awarded to the opponents; however, the scored goals were not eliminated.)	26	0	0	26	11	57	−46	0	Relegation

=== Mátyás group ===
Pos	Team	Pld	W	D	L	GF	GA	GD	Pts	Promotion or relegation
1	Törekvés SE	26	22	2	2	105	25	+80	46	Promotion to Nemzeti Bajnokság I
2	Debreceni VSC	26	21	0	5	111	34	+77	42	
3	Kolozsvári MÁV	26	15	2	9	77	51	+26	32	
4	Nagybányai SE	26	12	7	7	70	43	+27	31	
5	Dunakeszi Magyarság SE	26	14	3	9	64	54	+10	31	
6	Marosvásárhelyi SE	26	14	2	10	59	44	+15	30	
7	Zuglói Danuvia	26	13	3	10	72	53	+19	29	
8	Goldberger SE	26	13	2	11	57	60	−3	28	
9	Postás SE	26	7	8	11	51	73	−22	22	
10	MOVE Szabolcs TSE	26	7	6	13	46	72	−26	20	
11	Nagyváradi Törekvés	26	9	2	15	37	82	−45	20	
12	Ganz TE	26	6	6	14	42	54	−12	18	
13	Kolozsvári EAC	26	6	3	17	53	85	−32	15	Relegation
14	Szatmári SE (Note: Withdrew during the season.)	26	0	0	26	13	127	−114	0	Relegation

== See also ==
- 1941–42 Magyar Kupa
- 1941–42 Nemzeti Bajnokság I
