= Lajos Korányi =

Hungarian footballer

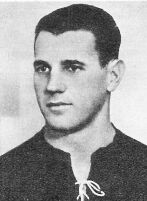

Personal information
- Full name: Lajos Korányi
- Birth name: Lajos Kronenberger
- Date of birth: 15 May 1907
- Place of birth: Szeged, Austria-Hungary
- Date of death: 29 January 1981 (aged 73)
- Place of death: Budapest, Hungary
- Position: Defender

Youth career
- Újszegedi TC

Senior career*
Years	Team	Apps	(Gls)
1927–1930	Bástya FC		
1927	→ Csabai Előre (loan)		
1930–1938	Ferencváros		
1938–1939	Phöbus FC		
1939–1940	Nemzeti SC		
1940–1941	Csepel SC		
1941–1943	Losonci AFC		

International career
1929–1941	Hungary	40	(0)
Medal record
Representing Hungary
FIFA World Cup
Runner-up	1938 France
- * Club domestic league appearances and goals

Lajos Korányi (née Kronenberger; 15 May 1907 – 29 January 1981) was a Hungarian footballer.

== Career ==
Korányi played for Újszegedi TC, Bástya FC, Csabai Előre, Ferencváros, Phöbus FC, Nemzeti SC, Csepel SC, Losonci AFC and for the Hungary national team. He appeared at the 1938 FIFA World Cup.

His brothers Mátyás and Désiré also played international football, the first with Hungary and the second with France.
