= Szabadkai AFC =

Hungarian football club

- Full name: Szabadkai Atlétikai és Futball Club
- Nickname: SzAFC
Home colours

Szabadkai Atlétikai és Futball Club is a defunct professional football club based in Subotica (in Hungarian: Szabadka), Serbia.

== History ==
Thanks to the First Vienna Award, Szabadka (in Serbian: Subotica) belonged to Hungary again. The club was registered by the Hungarian Football Federation. The club could enter the Hungarian league system at the fourth level.

Szabadka won the Bácska group of the 1943–44 Nemzeti Bajnokság III season and gained promotion to the second division. However, the 1944–45 Nemzeti Bajnokság II was suspended due to World War II.

== Honours ==
=== League ===
- Nemzeti Bajnokság III:
  - Winners (1): 1943–44

== Seasons ==
The table below shows the seasons of Szabadkai AFC.

Season	Tier	Club's name	Position	Pts
1940–41	4	Szabadkai AFC	5 / 6	4
1941–42	4	Szabadkai AFC	5 / 14	16
1942–43	4	Szabadkai AFC	1 / 10	33
1943–44	3	Szabadkai AFC	1 / 15	51
1944–45	2	Szabadkai AFC	10 / 16	2
1944–45	2	Szabadkai AFC	0 / 13	
