= Mississauga Eagles P.S.C. =

- Full name: Mississauga Eagles Professional Soccer Club
- Nickname(s): The Eagles
- Founded: 1998
- Dissolved: 1999
- Stadium: Wildwood Park, Malton, Ontario
- Capacity: 750+
- League: Canadian Professional Soccer League
Home colours	Away colours

The Mississauga Eagles P.S.C. were a soccer team that operated in the Canadian Professional Soccer League for only one season. The club came into existence in 1998, and become a founding member of the inaugural CPSL. The franchise achieved little success in the league, and failed to qualify for postseason. At the start of the 1999 CPSL season the club folded, and were replaced by the Oshawa Flames.

== History ==
In 1998, the Mississauga Eagles P.S.C. were founded and became an original member of the newly formed Canadian Professional Soccer League. Their home venue would become Wildwood Park located in Malton, Mississauga. The Mississauga franchise was owned and coached by Josef Komlodi, a former professional player in Hungary, and Germany. Notable players signed by the team were Hungarian import Attila Kovacs, and Vladimir Koval, a veteran from the Canadian National Soccer League. The club debuted on May 31, 1998, in a match against the York Region Shooters, and were defeated by a score of 3–1. Throughout the entire season Mississauga achieved little success within the league, and finished in a tie for seventh place with 10 points. One controversial event occurred on July 26, 1998, in a match against North York Astros, where Mississauga protested the match due to a dispute with team owner Komlodi and North York owner Bruno Ierullo about North York using a reserve team which operated in the Peel-Halton Regional Soccer League which violated Mississauga's territorial rights as the league operated within the boundaries of Mississauga's territory. The outcome of the event resulted in a forfeit for the Eagles, and a 2–0 victory for the Astros. After a disappointing last place finish, in January 1999, the Eagles decided to fold.

== 1998 standings ==
Place	Team	P	W	L	T	GF	GA	Points
1	Toronto Olympians	14	13	0	1	73	6	40
2	St. Catharines Wolves	14	8	3	3	31	26	27
3	Glen Shields	14	6	5	3	26	27	21
4	North York Astros	14	6	7	1	34	30	19
5	York Region Shooters	14	5	7	2	30	44	17
6	London City	14	4	7	3	27	42	15
7 (tie)	Mississauga Eagles P.S.C.	14	3	10	1	29	44	10
7 (tie)	Toronto Croatia	14	2	8	4	20	51	10
