= Attila Kovacs (footballer, born 1956) =

Hungarian footballer

Personal information
- Date of birth: 24 February 1956 (age 70)
- Place of birth: Pécs, Hungarian People's Republic
- Position: Goalkeeper

Senior career*
Years	Team	Apps	(Gls)
1978	Pécsi Vasutas SK		
1978–1979	Pécsi MFC	2	(0)
1979–1984	Csepel SC	156	(0)
1987	Vasas SC	14	(0)
1988	Kaposvári Rákóczi FC		
1989	Magyar Kábel SC		
1989	Valkeakosken Koskenpojat		
1990	Magyar Kábel SC		
1998	Mississauga Eagles		

International career
1983–1984	Hungary	7	(0)
- * Club domestic league appearances and goals

Attila Kovacs (born February 24, 1956) is a former Hungarian footballer who played primarily in Hungary and featured with the Hungary national football team.

== Playing career ==
Kovacs began his professional career in 1978 with Pécsi Vasutas SK. The following year he signed with Pécsi MFC of the Nemzeti Bajnokság I. In 1979, he signed with Csepel SC, where we would appear in 156 matches. He would spend time with Vasas SC, Kaposvári Rákóczi FC, and would conclude his career with lower leagues clubs like Magyar Kábel, and Konskapoet. In 1998, he would come out of retirement to sign with Mississauga Eagles P.S.C. of the Canadian Professional Soccer League. He made his debut for the club on June 17, 1998 in a match against York Region Shooters.

== International career ==
Kovacs played for the Hungary national football team from 1983 to 1984, and featured in seven matches. He made his debut for the national team on October 12, 1983 in a UEFA Euro 1984 qualifying match against England.
