= Székesfehérvári MÁV Előre SC =

Hungarian football club

- Full name: Székesfehérvári MÁV Előre Sport Club
- Nickname: Loki
- Founded: 1909
- Dissolved: 1996
- Ground: MÁV Előre stadion
- Capacity: 4,000
Home colours

Székesfehérvári MÁV Előre Sport Club was a Hungarian football club from the town of Székesfehérvár, Hungary.

== History ==
Székesfehérvári MÁV Előre Sport Club debuted in the 1977–78 season of the Hungarian League and finished 16th.

== Honours ==
- Nemzeti Bajnokság III
  - Winners (2): 1943–44, 1950

== Name changes ==
- 1909–1910: Székesfehérvári Déli Vasúti Testedző Kör
- 1910–1919: Székesfehérvári Déli Vasúti Műhelymunkások Testedző Köre
- 1919: merger with Székesfehérvári Előre Testgyakorló Kör
- 1919–1923: Székesfehérvári Déli Vasúti Testedző Kör
- 1923–1932: Székesfehérvári Duna-Száva-Adria Vasút Előre Testgyakorlók Köre
- 1932–1948: Székesfehérvári MÁV Előre Testedző Kör
- 1948–1949: Székesfehérvári Vasutas SE
- 1949–1955: Székesfehérvári Lokomotív Sport Kör
- 1955–1957: Székesfehérvári Törekvés SC
- 1957–1996:Székesfehérvári MÁV Előre SC

== Seasons ==
The table below shows the seasons of Székesfehérvári MÁV Előre.

Season	Tier	Club's name	Position	Pts
1913–14	2	Székesfehérvári Déli Vasúti MTK	0 / 5	
1919–20	2	Székesfehérvári Déli Vasúti Előre TK	2 / 5	6
1919–20	2	Székesfehérvári Déli Vasúti MTK	2 / 4	5
1920–21	2	Székesfehérvári Déli Vasút Előre TK	2 / 8	22
1921–22	2	Székesfehérvári Déli Vasút Előre TK	4 / 8	12
1922–23	3	Székesfehérvári Déli Vasút Előre TK	1 / 7	4
1923–24	2	Székesfehérvári Duna-Száva-Adria Vasúti Előre TK	7 / 10	17
1924–25	2	Székesfehérvári Duna-Száva-Adria Vasúti Előre TK	7 / 11	16
1925–26	2	Székesfehérvári Duna-Száva-Adria Vasút Előre TK	10 / 10	5
1926–27	3	Székesfehérvári Duna-Száva-Adria Vasút Előre TK	1 / 6	16
1927–28	2	Székesfehérvári Duna-Száva-Adria Vasút Előre TK	7 / 10	14
1928–29	2	Székesfehérvári DVE TK	5 / 10	20
1929–30	2	Déli Vasút Előre TK	6 / 11	20
1930–31	2	Székesfehérvári DVE	4 / 11	26
1931–32	2	Székesfehérvári DVE	4 / 11	21
1932–33	2	Székesfehérvári MÁV Előre	6 / 12	21
1933–34	2	Székesfehérvári MÁV Előre	10 / 12	19
1934–35	2	Székesfehérvári MÁV Előre	7 / 12	20
1935–36	2	Székesfehérvári MÁV Előre	6 / 14	28
1936–37	2	Székesfehérvári Előre	12 / 13	15
1937–38	3	Székesfehérvári MÁV Előre	1 / 13	44
1938–39	3	Székesfehérvári MÁV Előre	11 / 14	21
1939–40	3	Székesfehérvári MÁV Előre TK	12 / 14	19
1940–41	4	Székesfehérvári MÁV Előre TK	11 / 14	23
1941–42	4	Székesfehérvári MÁV Előre	1 / 14	44
1942–43	3	Székesfehérvári MÁV Előre	3 / 14	38
1943–44	3	Székesfehérvári MÁV Előre TK	1 / 16	51
1944–45	2	Székesfehérvári MÁV	10 / 16	6
1944–45	2	Székesfehérvári MÁV Előre	0 / 12	
1945–46	2	MÁV Előre	1 / 10	24
1946–47	2	Székesfehérvári MÁV Előre	10 / 14	21
1947–48	2	Székesfehérvári MÁV Előre	13 / 14	17
1948–49	2	Székesfehérvári Lokomotív	14 / 16	23
1949–50	2	Székesfehérvári Lokomotív	14 / 16	22
1950	3	Székesfehérvári Lokomotív	1 / 16	25
1951	3	Székesfehérvári Lokomotív	1 / 14	48
1952	3	Székesfehérvári Lokomotív	1 / 14	44
1953	3	Székesfehérvári Lokomotív	3 / 16	41
1954	3	Székesfehérvári Lokomotív	3 / 16	36
1955	3	Székesfehérvári Törekvés	7 / 16	32
1956	3	Székesfehérvár Törekvés	3 / 16	38
1957	3	Székesfehérvári MÁV Előre	1 / 10	25
1957–58	3	Székesfehérvári MÁV Előre SC	7 / 18	39
1958–59	3	Székesfehérvári MÁV Előre SC	11 / 16	26
1959–60	3	Székesfehérvári MÁV Előre	9 / 17	30
1960–61	3	Székesfehérvári MÁV Előre	5 / 16	38
1961–62	3	Székesfehérvári MÁV Előre	3 / 16	41
1962–63	3	Székesfehérvári MÁV Előre	4 / 16	42
1963	3	Székesfehérvári MÁV Előre	10 / 18	18
1964	3	Székesfehérvári MÁV Előre SC	13 / 18	30
1965	3	Székesfehérvári MÁV Előre SC	5 / 18	37
1966	3	Székesfehérvári MÁV Előre SC	10 / 18	35
1967	3	Székesfehérvári MÁV Előre SC	9 / 16	29
1968	3	Székesfehérvári MÁV Előre SC	1 / 16	42
1969	2	Székesfehérvári MÁV Előre SC	12 / 18	31
1970	2	Székesfehérvári MÁV Előre SC	8 / 9	10
1970–71	2	Székesfehérvári MÁV Előre SC	17 / 18	28
1971–72	3	Székesfehérvári MÁV Előre SC	11 / 16	27
1972–73	3	Székesfehérvári MÁV Előre SC	9 / 16	26
1973–74	3	Székesfehérvári MÁV Előre SC	11 / 16	29
1974–75	3	Székesfehérvári MÁV Előre	5 / 20	44
1975–76	3	Székesfehérvári MÁV Előre SC	2 / 20	53
1976–77	2	Székesfehérvári MÁV Előre SC	2 / 20	50
1977–78	1	Székesfehérvári MÁV Előre SC	16 / 18	24
1978–79	1	Székesfehérvári MÁV Előre SC	15 / 18	29
1979–80	1	Székesfehérvári MÁV Előre SC	16 / 18	22
1980–81	2	Székesfehérvári MÁV Előre SC	5 / 20	45
1981–82	2	Székesfehérvári MÁV Előre	8 / 16	31
1982–83	3	Székesfehérvári MÁV Előre SC	9 / 18	34
1983–84	3	Székesfehérvári MÁV Előre SC	16 / 18	17
1984–85	4	Székesfehérvári MÁV Előre SC	2 / 16	42
1985–86	4	Székesfehérvári MÁV Előre SC	1 / 16	41
1986–87	4	Székesfehérvári MÁV Előre	1 / 17	54
1987–88	3	Székesfehérvári MÁV Előre SC	17 / 18	7
1988–89	4	Székesfehérvári MÁV Előre SC	9 / 16	39
1989–90	4	MÁV Előre	7 / 18	51
1990–91	-	-	-	-
1991–92	-	-	-	-
1992–93	-	-	-	-
1993–94	-	-	-	-
1994–95	6	MÁV Előre	8 / 11	25
1995–96	5	MÁV Előre	16 / 16	30
