= Marosvásárhelyi Attila =

Hungarian football club

- Full name: Marosvásárhelyi Attila
- Ground: Erzsébetligeti pálya
Home colours

Marosvásárhelyi Attila is a defunct professional football club based in Târgu Mureș (in Hungarian: Marosvásárhely), Romania.

== History ==
Thanks to the First Vienna Award, Marosvásárhely (in Romanian: Târgu Mureș) belonged to Hungary again. The club was registered by the Hungarian Football Federation. The club could enter the Hungarian league system at the third level, Nemzeti Bajnokság III.

Marosvásárhelyi Attila won the Hargita group of the 1942–43 Nemzeti Bajnokság III season. However, in the Eastern group of the 1943–44 Nemzeti Bajnokság II season Marosvásárhelyi Attila finished in the last position and thus were relegated.

== Honours ==
=== League ===
- Nemzeti Bajnokság III:
  - Winners (1): 1942–43

== Seasons ==
The table below shows the seasons of Marosvásárhelyi Attila.

Season	Tier	Club's name	Position	Pts
1942–43	3	Marosvásárhelyi Attila	1 / 7	14
1943–44	2	Marosvásárhelyi Attila	14 / 14	0
1944–45	2	Marosvásárhelyi Attila	0 / 8	
1944–45	3	Marosvásárhelyi Attila SE	0 / 11	
