= Kassa (Bithynia) =

Town in ancient Bithynia

Coordinates: 40°41′26″N 30°15′49″E

Kassa was a town of ancient Bithynia. Its name does not occur in ancient authors but is inferred from epigraphic and other evidence.

Its site is located near Sapanca in Asiatic Turkey.
