= 1942–43 Nemzeti Bajnokság II =

Nemzeti Bajnokság II
- Season: 1942–43
- Champions: Győri ETO (Széchenyi); Szegedi VSE (Zrínyi); BSzKRT (Wesselényi); Budapesti VSC (Rákóczi); Debreceni VSC (Mátyás)
- Promoted: Szegedi VSE (Zrínyi); BSzKRT (Wesselényi); Debreceni VSC (Mátyás)

The 1942–43 Nemzeti Bajnokság II season was the 43rd edition of the Nemzeti Bajnokság II.

== League table ==
=== Széchenyi group ===
Pos	Team	Pld	W	D	L	GF	GA	GD	Pts	Relegation
1	Győri ETO	22	16	3	3	81	29	+52	35	
2	Szombathelyi FC	22	13	3	6	61	38	+23	29	
3	Érsekújvári SE	22	12	3	7	42	47	−5	27	
4	Alba Regia AK	22	9	4	9	48	45	+3	22	
5	Soproni VSE	22	9	4	9	45	47	−2	22	
6	Testvériség SE	22	10	2	10	34	60	−26	22	
7	Pápai PSC	22	8	5	9	49	42	+7	21	
8	Tokodi ÜSC	22	8	5	9	56	48	+8	21	
9	Magyar Pamut SC	22	10	1	11	51	49	+2	21	
10	Tatabányai SC	22	7	4	11	42	53	−11	18	
11	Hangya SE	22	4	6	12	35	67	−32	14	Relegation
12	Soproni FAC	22	4	4	14	40	59	−19	12	Relegation

=== Zrínyi group ===
Pos	Team	Pld	W	D	L	GF	GA	GD	Pts	Promotion or relegation
1	Szegedi Vasutas SE	26	18	7	1	56	21	+35	43	Promotion to Nemzeti Bajnokság I
2	Kaposvári Rákóczi AC	26	15	5	6	61	32	+29	35	
3	Kábelgyári SC	26	14	5	7	61	42	+19	33	
4	Szabadkai VAK	26	13	3	10	67	50	+17	29	
5	Makói VSE	26	13	3	10	53	44	+9	29	
6	Óbecsei Bocskai	26	13	2	11	42	47	−5	28	
7	Topolyai SE	26	13	1	12	38	54	−16	27	
8	Pécsi DVAC	26	9	7	10	46	51	−5	25	
9	Újverbászi CSE	26	10	4	12	49	67	−18	24	
10	Hódmezővásárhelyi TVE	26	8	8	10	42	64	−22	24	
11	Bethlen Gábor SE	26	10	3	13	49	57	−8	23	
12	Zentai AK	26	10	3	13	44	63	−19	23	
13	Szegedi TK	26	10	1	15	47	63	−16	21	Relegation
14	Szegedi Egyetemi AC (Note: Withdrew.)	26	0	0	26	0	0	0	0	Relegation

=== Wesselényi group ===
Pos	Team	Pld	W	D	L	GF	GA	GD	Pts	Promotion or relegation
1	BSZKRT	26	20	4	2	92	19	+73	44	Promotion to Nemzeti Bajnokság I
2	Zuglói Danuvia	26	18	4	4	81	36	+45	40	
3	Ganz TE	26	16	3	7	68	48	+20	35	
4	Gázgyár	26	14	4	8	66	52	+14	32	
5	Wekerletelepi SC	26	11	6	9	46	52	−6	28	
6	Szentlőrinci AC	26	11	4	11	80	66	+14	26	
7	Dunakeszi Magyarság	26	8	7	11	39	58	−19	23	
8	Kőbányai TK	26	8	6	12	33	36	−3	22	
9	Csepeli MOVE	26	9	4	13	51	57	−6	22	
10	Hungária SC	26	10	2	14	49	68	−19	22	
11	ÁMOTE	26	7	5	14	45	71	−26	19	
12	Pénzügyi TSC	26	6	7	13	38	67	−29	19	
13	MOVE Budapesti LK	26	8	2	16	42	59	−17	18	Relegation
14	Postás SE	26	6	2	18	41	82	−41	14	Relegation

=== Rákóczi group ===
Pos	Team	Pld	W	D	L	GF	GA	GD	Pts	Relegation
1	Budapesti VSC	22	13	4	5	50	29	+21	30	
2	Ungvári AC	22	11	3	8	54	41	+13	25	
3	Kassai RAC	22	11	2	9	35	40	−5	24	
4	MÁVAG	22	9	5	8	47	38	+9	23	
5	Fegyvergyári SK	22	9	4	9	51	40	+11	22	
6	Ózdi VTK	22	9	4	9	45	43	+2	22	
7	Rusj SK	22	8	5	9	38	39	−1	21	
8	Perecesi TK	22	8	5	9	38	41	−3	21	
9	Losonci AFC	22	9	3	10	42	48	−6	21	
10	Miskolci VSC	22	8	3	11	37	44	−7	19	
11	Kassai VSC	22	7	5	10	39	58	−19	19	Relegation
12	MOVE Szabolcs	22	7	3	12	38	53	−15	17	Relegation

=== Mátyás group ===
Pos	Team	Pld	W	D	L	GF	GA	GD	Pts	Promotion or relegation
1	Debreceni VSC	18	15	3	0	71	20	+51	33	Promotion to Nemzeti Bajnokság I
2	Nagybányai SE	18	11	1	6	44	40	+4	23	
3	Kolozsvári MÁV	18	9	2	7	32	37	−5	20	
4	Marosvásárhelyi SE	18	9	1	8	40	38	+2	19	
5	Székelyföldi MÁV	18	8	3	7	31	32	−1	19	
6	Kolozsvári Bástya	18	8	3	7	35	41	−6	19	
7	Békéscsabai Törekvés	18	7	3	8	32	52	−20	17	
8	Marosvásárhelyi NMKTE	18	8	0	10	33	37	−4	16	
9	Csabai AK	18	5	4	9	27	48	−21	14	Relegation
10	Nagyváradi Törekvés (Note: Withdrew.)	18	0	0	18	0	0	0	0	Relegation

== Promotion playoff ==
Pos	Team	Pld	W	D	L	GF	GA	GD	Pts	Promotion
1	BSzKRT SE	8	5	1	2	20	13	+7	11	Promotion to Nemzeti Bajnokság I
2	Szegedi VSE	8	4	2	2	16	12	+4	10	Promotion to Nemzeti Bajnokság I
3	Debreceni VSC	8	5	0	3	22	22	0	10	Promotion to Nemzeti Bajnokság I
4	Győri ETO FC	8	4	0	4	18	13	+5	8	
5	Budapesti VSC	8	0	1	7	9	25	−16	1	

== See also ==
- 1942–43 Magyar Kupa
- 1942–43 Nemzeti Bajnokság I
