= Kelenföldi Textilgyár SE =

Hungarian football club

- Full name: Kelenföldi Textilgyár Sport Egyesület
- Founded: 1926
- Dissolved: 1996
- Ground: KELTEX pálya
- Capacity: 1,600
Home colours

Kelenföldi Textilgyár Sport Egyesület was a Hungarian football club from the town of Kelenföld, Budapest, Hungary.

== History ==
Kelenföldi Textilgyár Sport Egyesület debuted in the 1948–49 season of the Hungarian League and finished last.

== Name Changes ==
- 1926–1928: Vespag
- 1928–1942: Goldberger Sport Egyesület
- 1942–1945: Bethlen Gábor SE
- 1945–1950: Goldberger Sport Egyesület
- 1950–1951: Kelenföldi Textil
- 1951–1956: Vörös Lobogó Keltex SK
- 1956–1968: Goldberger Sport Egyesület
- 1968–1988: Kelenföldi Textilgyár Sport Egyesület
- 1988–1996: Kelenföldi Goldberger SE
- 1996: merger with Kelenföldi TE

== Honours ==
=== Domestic ===
- Nemzeti Bajnokság II
  - Winners (2): 1947–48, 1951
- Nemzeti Bajnokság III
  - Winners (1): 1940–41

== Seasons ==
The table below shows the seasons of Kelenföldi Goldberger SE.

Season	Tier	Club's name	Position	Pts
1932–33	6	Goldberger SE	2 / 10	29
1933–34	5	Goldberger SE	1 / 12	43
1934–35	4	Goldberger SE	1 / 11	34
1935–36	3	Goldberger SE	1 / 13	40
1936–37	2	Goldberger SE	6 / 13	23
1937–38	2	Goldberger SE	6 / 14	27
1938–39	3	Goldberger SE	6 / 14	27
1939–40	3	Goldberger SE	3 / 14	36
1940–41	3	Goldberger SE	1 / 12	33
1941–42	2	Goldberger SE	8 / 14	28
1942–43	2	Bethlen Gábor SE	11 / 14	23
1943–44	2	Bethlen Gábor SE (Budapest)	9 / 14	27
1944–45	2	Bethlen Gábor SE	3 / 16	11
1944–45	2	Bethlen Gábor SE	0 / 12	
1945	2	Bethlen Gábor SE	4 / 12	27
1945–46	2	Goldberger SE	3 / 14	32
1946–47	2	Goldberger SE	6 / 14	28
1947–48	2	Goldberger SE	1 / 14	38
1948–49	1	Goldberger SE	16 / 16	12
1949–50	2	Goldberger SE	6 / 16	31
1950	2	Kelenföldi Textil	4 / 16	18
1951	2	Vörös Lobogó Keltex	1 / 14	40
1952	2	Vörös Lobogó Keltex	15 / 18	25
1953	3	Vörös Lobogó Keltex	4 / 16	38
1954	3	Vörös Lobogó KELTEX	4 / 16	40
1955	3	Vörös Lobogó Keltex	3 / 16	40
1956	3	Vörös Lobogó KELTEX	10 / 14	23
1957	3	Goldberger SE	3 / 8	17
1957–58	3	Goldberger SE	6 / 16	31
1958–59	3	Goldberger SE	7 / 16	31
1959–60	3	Goldberger SE	11 / 17	28
1960–61	3	Goldberger SE	14 / 16	26
1961–62	4	Goldberger SE	6 / 16	33
1962–63	4	Goldberger SE	1 / 16	50
1963	4	Goldberger SE	9 / 16	15
1964	4	Kelenföldi Goldberger	12 / 16	25
1965	4	Kelenföldi Goldberger SE	10 / 16	27
1966	4	Kelenföldi Goldberger SE	3 / 16	43
1967	3	Kelenföldi Goldberger SE	12 / 16	27
1968	3	Kelenföldi Goldberger SE	15 / 16	22
1969	4	KELTEX SE	1 / 16	44
1970	3	KELTEX SE	16 / 16	6
1970–71	3	KELTEX SE	14 / 16	23
1971–72	4	KELTEX SE	1 / 16	42
1972–73	3	KELTEX SE	15 / 16	17
1973–74	4	KELTEX	4 / 16	38
1974–75	3	KELTEX	17 / 20	31
1975–76	4	KELTEX	4 / 18	42
1976–77	4	KELTEX SE	6 / 18	39
1977–78	4	KELTEX	5 / 18	41
1978–79	3	KELTEX	5 / 20	45
1979–80	3	KELTEX	5 / 20	44
1980–81	3	KELTEX	13 / 20	35
1981–82	4	KELTEX	2 / 16	42
1982–83	4	KELTEX	8 / 16	29
1983–84	4	KELTEX SE	6 / 16	34
1984–85	4	KELTEX SE	3 / 16	38
1985–86	4	KELTEX SE	4 / 16	33
1986–87	4	Keltex SE	10 / 16	29
1987–88	4	KELTEX SE	8 / 16	30
1988–89	4	Kelenföldi Goldberger	10 / 16	27
1989–90	4	Kelenföldi Goldberger	11 / 16	35
1990–91	4	Kelenföldi Goldberger SE	13 / 16	27
1991–92	4	Kelenföldi Goldberger	12 / 16	26
1992–93	4	Kelenföldi Goldberger	10 / 16	23
1993–94	4	Kelenföldi Goldberger	10 / 16	27
1994–95	4	Kelenföldi Goldberger	12 / 16	33
1995–96	4	Kelenföldi Goldberger SE	12 / 16	33
1996–97	4	Kelenföldi Goldberger	16 / 16	14
