= 1940–41 Nemzeti Bajnokság II =

Nemzeti Bajnokság II
- Season: 1940–41
- Champions: Szegedi VSE (Duna); Lampart FC (Tisza); MÁVAG SK (Tisza); Nagyváradi AC (Kolozsvár) Kolozsvári AC (Kolozsvár); Marosvásárhelyi SE (Székelyföld, north); Sepsiszentgyörgyi Textil SE (Székelyföld south)
- Promoted: Szegedi VSE (Duna); Lampart FC (Tisza); MÁVAG SK (Tisza); Nagyváradi AC (Kolozsvár); Kolozsvári AC (Kolozsvár)

The 1940–41 Nemzeti Bajnokság II season was the 41st edition of the Nemzeti Bajnokság II. In this season, there were three groups and two subgroups. Two groups were named after the two main rivers in Hungary, namely Duna and Tisza, while one groip was named after the new territories gained in the World War II, namely Kolozsvár (Cluj-Napoca) and Székelyföld (Székely Land).

== League table ==
=== Duna group ===
Pos	Team	Pld	W	D	L	GF	GA	GD	Pts	Promotion or relegation
1	Szegedi VSE	26	14	10	2	53	28	+25	38	Promotion to Nemzeti Bajnokság I
2	Pécsi DVAC	26	14	5	7	51	37	+14	33	
3	Zuglói Danuvia SE	26	12	7	7	52	40	+12	31	
4	Vasas SC	26	12	6	8	51	43	+8	30	
5	Szombathelyi FC	26	11	4	11	48	44	+4	26	
6	Budapesti LK	26	10	6	10	56	56	0	26	
6	Dunakeszi Magyarság SE	26	10	6	10	39	39	0	26	
8	ETO	26	12	2	12	32	52	−20	26	
9	Soproni VSE	26	11	3	12	44	53	−9	25	
10	Soproni FAC	26	11	1	14	60	65	−5	23	
11	Pénzügyi TSC	26	10	3	13	42	49	−7	23	
12	Postás SE	26	8	5	13	48	58	−10	21	
13	Szegedi EAC	26	10	1	15	44	55	−11	21	Relegation
14	MTK	26	5	5	16	30	31	−1	15	Relegation

=== Tisza group ===
Pos	Team	Pld	W	D	L	GF	GA	GD	Pts	Promotion or relegation
1	Lampart FC	26	19	4	3	82	35	+47	42	Promotion to Nemzeti Bajnokság I
2	MÁVAG SK	26	19	2	5	88	38	+50	40	Promotion to Nemzeti Bajnokság I
3	Debreceni VSC	26	17	4	5	77	39	+38	38	
4	MOVE Ózdi VTK	26	13	4	9	60	42	+18	30	
5	Perecesi TK	26	13	3	10	80	48	+32	29	
6	Ganz TE	26	12	5	9	58	44	+14	29	
7	Budapesti VSC	26	12	5	9	67	58	+9	29	
8	Miskolci VSC	26	11	4	11	62	45	+17	26	
9	SK Rusj Ungvár	26	11	4	11	57	53	+4	26	
10	Kassai AC	26	9	5	12	48	66	−18	23	
11	Kassai Rákóczi SE	26	8	4	14	43	68	−25	20	
12	Salgótarjáni SE	26	8	2	16	54	81	−27	18	
13	MOVE Terézvárosi Előre	26	4	5	17	24	75	−51	13	Relegation
14	Mátészalkai TK	26	0	1	25	12	120	−108	1	Relegation

=== Kolozsvár group ===
Pos	Team	Pld	W	D	L	GF	GA	GD	Pts	Promotion
1	Nagyváradi AC	10	10	0	0	58	6	+52	20	Promotion to Nemzeti Bajnokság I
2	Nagybányai SE	10	8	0	2	25	16	+9	16	
3	Kolozsvári AC	10	4	1	5	29	27	+2	9	Promotion to Nemzeti Bajnokság I
4	Kolozsvári Bástya SE	10	4	1	5	24	26	−2	9	
5	Szatmárnémeti SE	10	2	1	7	10	50	−40	5	
6	Nagyváradi Törekvés	10	0	1	9	8	29	−21	1	

=== Székelyföld group ===
==== North ====
Pos	Team	Pld	W	D	L	GF	GA	GD	Pts
1	Marosvásárhelyi SE	8	6	1	1	43	10	+33	13
2	Marosvásárhelyi PMTE	8	4	1	3	32	14	+18	9
3	Székelykeresztúri AC	8	1	5	2	15	27	−12	7
4	Székelyudvarhelyi Hargita	8	2	2	4	13	42	−29	6
5	Szászrégeni Turul	8	1	3	4	14	24	−10	5

==== South ====
Pos	Team	Pld	W	D	L	GF	GA	GD	Pts
1	Sepsiszentgyörgyi Textil SE	8	7	1	0	46	11	+35	15
2	Gyergyószentmiklósi SE	8	4	1	3	18	25	−7	9
3	Kézdivásárhelyi SE	8	2	3	3	17	24	−7	7
4	Sepsiszentgyörgyi Corvin	8	3	0	5	20	21	−1	6
5	Csíkszeredai TE	8	1	1	6	10	30	−20	3

== See also ==
- 1940–41 Magyar Kupa
- 1940–41 Nemzeti Bajnokság I
