= 1944–45 Nemzeti Bajnokság II =

Nemzeti Bajnokság II
- Season: 1944–45
- Champions: None (suspended)
- Promoted: None

The 1944–45 Nemzeti Bajnokság II season was the 45th edition of the Nemzeti Bajnokság II. Sixteen groups were created based on the regions of Hungary. The championship was suspended due to World War II in November 1944.

== League table ==
=== Alföld group ===
Pos	Team	Pld	W	D	L	GF	GA	GD	Pts
1	Bácska Szabadkai AC	5	4	0	1	18	6	+12	8
2	Szegedi HASE	4	3	1	0	16	3	+13	7
3	Szabadkai VAK	3	3	0	0	32	1	+31	6
4	Tisza Vasutas SE	3	3	0	0	19	1	+18	6
5	Szegedi TK	3	3	0	0	10	6	+4	6
6	Zentai AK	3	2	1	0	18	3	+15	5
7	Makói AK	1	1	0	0	8	3	+5	2
8	Bajai Türr István SE	3	0	2	1	4	6	−2	2
9	MOVE Szabadkai SE	3	1	0	2	6	10	−4	2
10	Szabadkai AFC	4	1	0	3	8	14	−6	2
11	Kelebiai LE	5	1	0	4	8	23	−15	2
12	Újszegedi TC	1	0	0	1	1	4	−3	0
13	Makói VSE	2	0	0	2	2	10	−8	0
14	Jánoshalmi SE	3	0	0	3	2	24	−22	0
15	Bácsalmási MOVE	3	0	0	3	2	28	−26	0
16	Szabadkai KAC	2	0	0	2	0	12	−12	0

None of the teams were promoted or relegated due to the suspension of the competition

=== Budapest group ===
Pos	Team	Pld	W	D	L	GF	GA	GD	Pts
1	MOVE TE	9	8	1	0	46	9	+37	17
2	Csepeli MOVE	9	7	2	0	34	5	+29	16
3	Csepeli GyTK	9	7	0	2	45	14	+31	14
4	Pesterzsébeti Kossuth	9	6	1	2	25	13	+12	13
5	Hoffher SC	9	6	0	3	38	12	+26	12
6	Kistext SE	7	5	1	1	35	20	+15	11
7	Wekerletelepi SC	8	4	0	4	26	16	+10	8
8	MOVE Monor	8	3	2	3	13	15	−2	8
9	Pestszentimrei MOVE	7	4	0	3	22	26	−4	8
10	Hungária SC	8	3	0	5	11	22	−11	6
11	Erzsébeti TC	7	2	2	3	8	17	−9	6
12	Soroksári AC	9	1	2	6	20	27	−7	4
13	Kispesti AC	8	2	0	6	12	33	−21	4
14	Szent László FC	7	1	0	6	7	48	−41	2
15	Pesterzsébeti Rákóczi	8	0	1	7	14	40	−26	1
16	Szemeretelepi TE	7	0	0	7	4	45	−41	0

None of the teams were promoted or relegated due to the suspension of the competition

=== Budavidéki group ===
Pos	Team	Pld	W	D	L	GF	GA	GD	Pts
1	Kábelgyár SC	10	8	1	1	23	11	+12	17
2	OMTK	10	7	0	3	24	11	+13	14
3	Bethlen Gábor SE	10	4	3	3	21	19	+2	11
4	Veszprémi Danuvia SE	8	5	0	3	25	16	+9	10
5	Alba Regia AK	9	4	1	4	25	17	+8	9
6	Tárnoki KLE	9	4	1	4	28	23	+5	9
7	Székesfehérvári RASE	7	4	0	3	16	10	+6	8
8	Budafoki LE	7	3	2	2	12	8	+4	8
9	Budafoki MTE	6	3	1	2	8	14	−6	7
10	Székesfehérvári MÁV	4	2	2	0	22	8	+14	6
11	Várpalotai BSE	7	2	2	3	12	12	0	6
12	Siófoki SE	7	3	0	4	12	16	−4	6
13	BEAC	8	2	1	5	13	19	−6	5
14	Kelenföldi FC	9	1	3	5	11	26	−15	5
15	Törökbálinti TC	10	2	1	7	14	34	−20	5
16	Érdi PLE	7	1	0	6	9	32	−23	2

None of the teams were promoted or relegated due to the suspension of the competition

=== Déldunántúl group ===
Pos	Team	Pld	W	D	L	GF	GA	GD	Pts
1	Kaposvári Turul SE	8	7	1	0	32	5	+27	15
2	Nagykanizsai VTE	8	7	0	1	36	9	+27	14
3	Pécsi DVAC	8	6	1	1	20	15	+5	13
4	Nagykanizsai Zrínyi Miklós TE	7	4	1	2	17	8	+9	9
5	Kaposvári Rákóczi AC	8	4	0	4	15	18	−3	8
6	Zsolnay SE	8	3	1	4	12	25	−13	7
7	Pécsi BTC	8	2	2	4	8	11	−3	6
8	Pécsi Vasutas SK	9	3	0	6	11	17	−6	6
9	Simontornyai BTC	6	2	1	3	3	4	−1	5
10	Dombóvári VSE	7	1	1	5	6	18	−12	3
11	Nagymányoki SE	6	1	0	5	3	10	−7	2
12	Barcsi LE	7	1	0	6	4	27	−23	2
-	Csáktornyai Zrínyi TE	0	-	-	-	-	-	—	0
-	Pélmonostori CSE	0	-	-	-	-	-	—	0

None of the teams were promoted or relegated due to the suspension of the competition

=== Délvidéki group ===
Pos	Team	Pld	W	D	L	GF	GA	GD	Pts
1	Zombori MÁV	4	3	1	0	13	4	+9	7
2	MOVE Zombori TK	4	3	0	1	14	4	+10	6
3	Topolyai SE	4	2	2	0	14	5	+9	6
4	Temerini TC	4	3	0	1	11	9	+2	6
5	Kulai AFC	3	2	0	1	8	5	+3	4
6	Óbecsei Bocskai	3	2	0	1	11	7	+4	4
7	Újverbászi CSE	4	2	0	2	11	9	+2	4
8	Zombori SE	4	2	0	2	12	10	+2	4
9	Újvidéki AC II.	3	2	0	1	6	5	+1	4
10	Petrőci SC	4	1	1	2	11	14	−3	3
11	Bezdáni SE	3	1	0	2	12	10	+2	2
12	Adai SC	4	1	0	3	7	21	−14	2
13	Szenttamási Csaba	4	0	0	4	4	19	−15	0
14	Újvidéki VAK	4	0	0	4	3	15	−12	0

None of the teams were promoted or relegated due to the suspension of the competition

=== Dunamelléki group ===
Pos	Team	Pld	W	D	L	GF	GA	GD	Pts
1	Budapesti VSC	11	10	1	0	31	7	+24	21
2	Mátyás UTSE	13	8	0	5	41	34	+7	16
3	Dunakeszi Magyarság	9	7	1	1	24	10	+14	15
4	MOVE Érsekújvári SE	6	5	0	1	21	4	+17	10
5	Újpesti TE	8	3	4	1	18	10	+8	10
6	Váci SE	8	4	1	3	19	16	+3	9
7	Váci Reménység	9	4	1	4	14	15	−1	9
8	Werbőczy SE	11	4	1	6	32	31	+1	9
9	Magyar Pamutipari SC	7	3	2	2	24	18	+6	8
10	URAK	11	3	2	6	23	22	+1	8
11	Lévai TE	6	2	0	4	5	12	−7	4
12	MÁV Előre	6	1	2	3	9	25	−16	4
13	Párkányi TE	8	1	1	6	8	15	−7	3
14	UVASC	6	1	0	5	14	18	−4	2
15	MOVE Rákosszentmihályi TSE	6	1	0	5	5	22	−17	2
16	Balassa TSE	7	1	0	6	7	26	−19	2

None of the teams were promoted or relegated due to the suspension of the competition

=== Északdunántúli group ===
Pos	Team	Pld	W	D	L	GF	GA	GD	Pts
1	Haladás	8	6	1	1	28	7	+21	13
2	Tatabányai SC	7	6	1	0	14	5	+9	13
3	Győri ETO	9	6	1	2	22	10	+12	13
4	Soproni VSE	8	5	1	2	36	8	+28	11
5	Szombathelyi FC	8	5	1	2	18	16	+2	11
6	Komáromi AC	9	4	2	3	23	17	+6	10
7	Soproni FAC	8	5	0	3	16	17	−1	10
8	Pápai SC	9	4	0	5	17	20	−3	8
9	Mura SE	8	3	1	4	13	14	−1	7
10	Komáromi FC	8	2	2	4	8	10	−2	6
11	MOVE Zalaegerszegi SE	9	2	1	6	7	27	−20	5
12	Kühne SE	8	1	1	6	13	24	−11	3
13	II. ker. SC	7	0	2	5	5	20	−15	2
14	Győri AC	8	1	0	7	7	32	−25	2

None of the teams were promoted or relegated due to the suspension of the competition

=== Felsőtisza group ===
Pos	Team	Pld	W	D	L	GF	GA	GD	Pts
1	Nagybányai Jószerencse SE	2	1	1	0	1	0	+1	3
2	Nyíregyházi Vasutas SC	2	1	1	0	2	1	+1	3
3	Debreceni Vasutas SC II.	1	1	0	0	7	0	+7	2
4	Szatmári TSE	1	1	0	0	6	0	+6	2
5	Szatmári VSE	2	1	0	1	4	4	0	2
6	Szatmári SE	2	1	0	1	3	7	−4	2
7	Debreceni HASE	0	-	-	-	-	-	—	0
7	Debreceni Postás	0	-	-	-	-	-	—	0
7	Debreceni MTE	0	-	-	-	-	-	—	0
7	MOVE Szabolcs	0	-	-	-	-	-	—	0
12	Püspökladányi MÁV	1	0	0	1	2	3	−1	0
13	Érmihályfalvi LE	1	0	0	1	1	3	−2	0
14	Nagybányai Petrozsény SE	2	0	0	2	0	8	−8	0

None of the teams were promoted or relegated due to the suspension of the competition

=== Felvidéki group (Búkkvidéki) ===
Pos	Team	Pld	W	D	L	GF	GA	GD	Pts
1	Kassai Vasutas SC	7	5	0	2	22	13	+9	10
2	Perecesi TK	5	4	1	0	23	7	+16	9
3	MOVE Ózdi VTK	5	4	1	0	16	8	+8	9
4	Miskolci Vasutas SC	6	3	2	1	22	6	+16	8
5	Kassai Rákóczi AC	6	3	2	1	12	7	+5	8
6	Alberttelepi MÁVAG	7	2	2	3	14	19	−5	6
7	Borsodnádasdi LASE	5	1	1	3	6	10	−4	3
8	MOVE Egri SE	4	1	0	3	11	11	0	2
9	MÁV Sátoraljaújhelyi AC	4	0	2	2	2	12	−10	2
10	Miskolci MOVE	7	1	0	6	10	29	−19	2
11	Farkaslyuki OTE	3	0	0	3	2	18	−16	0

None of the teams were promoted or relegated due to the suspension of the competition

=== Felvidéki group (Mátravidéki) ===
Pos	Team	Pld	W	D	L	GF	GA	GD	Pts
-	Salgótarjáni BTC II.	0	-	-	-	-	-	—	0
-	Füleki VSC	0	-	-	-	-	-	—	0
-	Balassagyarmati MÁV	0	-	-	-	-	-	—	0
-	UVASC	0	-	-	-	-	-	—	0
-	Losoncapátfalvi TSE	0	-	-	-	-	-	—	0
-	Pálfalvai BÜSE	0	-	-	-	-	-	—	0
-	Rózsaszentmártoni BSE	0	-	-	-	-	-	—	0
-	Salgótarjáni BTK	0	-	-	-	-	-	—	0
-	Salgótarjáni SE	0	-	-	-	-	-	—	0
-	Rimaszombati TSE	0	-	-	-	-	-	—	0
-	Baglyasaljai SE	0	-	-	-	-	-	—	0
-	Hangya SE	0	-	-	-	-	-	—	0
-	MOVE Budakalászi TSE	0	-	-	-	-	-	—	0
-	Gyöngyösi AK	0	-	-	-	-	-	—	0
-	Losonci AFC	0	-	-	-	-	-	—	0

None of the teams were promoted or relegated due to the suspension of the competition

=== Kárpátaljai group ===
Pos	Team	Pld	W	D	L	GF	GA	GD	Pts
1	Munkácsi LSE	3	1	1	1	14	5	+9	3
2	Huszti MOVE	2	1	1	0	7	4	+3	3
3	Nagyszőlősi SE	2	1	1	0	5	4	+1	3
3	Rusj SK	2	1	1	0	5	4	+1	3
5	Királyházi MÁV	2	1	0	1	6	3	+3	2
6	Beregszászi FTC	1	1	0	0	3	1	+2	2
7	Aknaszaltinai BTE	1	1	0	0	3	2	+1	2
8	Csapi MÁV SE	0	-	-	-	-	-	—	0
8	Kisvárdai MOVE	0	-	-	-	-	-	—	0
8	Perecsenyi Bantlin SK	0	-	-	-	-	-	—	0
8	Rahói LE	0	-	-	-	-	-	—	0
12	Kőrösmezői LE	1	0	0	1	0	4	−4	0
13	Máramarosszigeti SE	3	0	0	3	4	9	−5	0
14	Munkácsi Árpád SE	1	0	0	1	0	11	−11	0

None of the teams were promoted or relegated due to the suspension of the competition

=== Kolozsvári group ===
Pos	Team	Pld	W	D	L	GF	GA	GD	Pts
-	Kolozsvári MÁV	0	-	-	-	-	-	—	0
-	Kolozsvári Bástya SE	0	-	-	-	-	-	—	0
-	Kolozsvári EAC	0	-	-	-	-	-	—	0
-	Kolozsvári AC II.	0	-	-	-	-	-	—	0
-	Kolozsvári MTE	0	-	-	-	-	-	—	0
-	Dési MÁV Törekvés	0	-	-	-	-	-	—	0
-	Dési Egyetemes SE	0	-	-	-	-	-	—	0
-	Besztercei MSE	0	-	-	-	-	-	—	0
-	Kolozsvári Postás	0	-	-	-	-	-	—	0
-	Kolozsvári KASE	0	-	-	-	-	-	—	0
-	Kolozsvári CSE	0	-	-	-	-	-	—	0
-	Szamosújvári Törekvés	0	-	-	-	-	-	—	0
-	Kolozsvári MFSE	0	-	-	-	-	-	—	0

None of the teams were promoted or relegated due to the suspension of the competition

=== Körösmenti group ===
Pos	Team	Pld	W	D	L	GF	GA	GD	Pts
1	Csabai AK	3	3	0	0	14	5	+9	6
2	Békéscsabai Törekvés	4	2	1	1	14	8	+6	5
3	Nagyváradi Törekvés	2	2	0	0	9	0	+9	4
4	Szarvasi Turul	3	2	0	1	8	2	+6	4
5	Békéscsabai MÁV	2	1	1	0	4	2	+2	3
6	Hódmezővásárhelyi TVE	2	1	0	1	6	3	+3	2
7	MOVE Szentesi TE	2	1	0	1	7	5	+2	2
8	Nagyváradi MÁV	3	1	0	2	5	4	+1	2
9	Csongrádi LE	3	1	0	2	5	11	−6	2
10	Mezőberényi SE	3	1	0	2	4	11	−7	2
11	Mezőkovácsházi TE	3	1	0	2	1	10	−9	2
12	Gyulai AC	1	0	0	1	2	4	−2	0
13	Szentesi MÁV	1	0	0	1	1	8	−7	0
14	Gyulai TE	1	0	0	1	0	4	−4	0

None of the teams were promoted or relegated due to the suspension of the competition

=== Középmagyar group ===
Pos	Team	Pld	W	D	L	GF	GA	GD	Pts
1	Ferencvárosi TC	8	6	0	2	34	22	+12	12
2	Postás SE	8	4	2	2	23	12	+11	10
3	EMERGÉ SC	8	5	0	3	16	17	−1	10
4	Wesselényi Miklós SE	7	3	3	1	23	17	+6	9
5	Nagykőrösi MOVE	3	3	0	0	9	0	+9	6
6	Ceglédi VSE	4	3	0	1	15	8	+7	6
7	Cikta LE	5	3	0	2	15	8	+7	6
8	MOVE Ceglédi TSE	5	2	1	2	16	14	+2	5
9	Hangya SE	4	2	0	2	15	8	+7	4
10	Kecskeméti TE	5	2	0	3	15	15	0	4
11	Szolnoki LE	2	1	0	1	9	6	+3	2
12	Szolnoki MÁV SE	2	1	0	1	8	9	−1	2
13	Gamma SzSE	5	0	2	3	11	16	−5	2
14	Üllői DSK	4	1	0	3	4	21	−17	2
15	Albertirsa	5	0	0	5	9	21	−12	0
16	Kecskeméti AC	5	0	0	5	5	33	−28	0

None of the teams were promoted or relegated due to the suspension of the competition

=== Pilisvidéki group ===
Pos	Team	Pld	W	D	L	GF	GA	GD	Pts
1	OTE III. ker.	10	8	1	1	31	15	+16	17
2	Magyar Acél SE	12	8	0	4	49	23	+26	16
3	VI. ker. SC	11	7	1	3	34	15	+19	15
4	MOVE Esztergomi TSE	11	6	3	2	26	13	+13	15
5	Dorogi AC	9	5	2	2	20	12	+8	12
6	Pénzügyi TSC	7	5	0	2	16	11	+5	10
7	Felten SC	10	4	2	4	32	28	+4	10
8	Budapesti TK	8	3	2	3	15	21	−6	8
9	Tokodi Üveggyári SC	9	3	1	5	30	21	+9	7
10	MOVE Szentendrei TSE	7	3	1	3	12	12	0	7
11	Széchenyi SK	10	2	2	6	13	33	−20	6
12	MOVE Csillaghegyi TSE	10	2	1	7	7	26	−19	5
13	Annavölgyi SE	7	2	0	5	9	18	−9	4
14	Műegyetemi AFC	8	2	0	6	12	32	−20	4
15	Ganzhajó TE	7	0	3	4	15	26	−11	3
16	Főv. TKör	6	1	1	4	8	23	−15	3

None of the teams were promoted or relegated due to the suspension of the competition

=== Rákosvidéki group ===
Pos	Team	Pld	W	D	L	GF	GA	GD	Pts
1	Fegyvergyár	6	5	1	0	27	5	+22	11
2	Törekvés SE	7	5	1	1	25	6	+19	11
3	Rákoscsabai TK	7	5	1	1	31	10	+21	11
4	Görgey Arthur SE	8	4	1	3	20	7	+13	9
5	Testvériség SE	7	3	3	1	20	10	+10	9
6	Hatvani VSE	6	4	0	2	17	3	+14	8
7	Gödöllői ISE	7	4	0	3	12	20	−8	8
8	Jászberényi Lehel	5	3	1	1	5	8	−3	7
9	Péceli AC	6	2	2	2	9	9	0	6
10	Herminamezei AC	6	2	1	3	11	21	−10	5
11	Rákoskeresztúri TE	5	1	2	2	9	12	−3	4
12	MOVE BRSC	6	0	4	2	9	13	−4	4
13	Kerámia SC	6	0	2	4	7	18	−11	2
14	Magyar Textil SE	8	0	1	7	9	30	−21	1
15	Kőbányai TK	4	0	0	4	4	16	−12	0
16	MOVE Budakalász	2	0	0	2	1	28	−27	0

None of the teams were promoted or relegated due to the suspension of the competition

=== Székelyföld (Csiki) group ===
Pos	Team	Pld	W	D	L	GF	GA	GD	Pts
-	Sepsiszentgyörgyi SE	0	-	-	-	-	-	—	0
-	Sepsiszentgyörgyi Textil	0	-	-	-	-	-	—	0
-	Gyergyószentmiklósi SE	0	-	-	-	-	-	—	0
-	Kézdivásárhelyi Gábor Áron SE	0	-	-	-	-	-	—	0
-	Csíkszeredai TE	0	-	-	-	-	-	—	0

None of the teams were promoted or relegated due to the suspension of the competition

=== Székelyföld (Hargitai) group ===
Pos	Team	Pld	W	D	L	GF	GA	GD	Pts
-	Székelyföldi MÁV	0	-	-	-	-	-	—	0
-	Marosvásárhelyi NMKTK	0	-	-	-	-	-	—	0
-	Marosvásárhelyi SE	0	-	-	-	-	-	—	0
-	Marosvásárhelyi Attila	0	-	-	-	-	-	—	0
-	Székelyudvarhelyi Hargita	0	-	-	-	-	-	—	0
-	Székelyudvarhelyi Csaba	0	-	-	-	-	-	—	0
-	Székelykeresztúri SE	0	-	-	-	-	-	—	0
-	Szászrégeni Turul	0	-	-	-	-	-	—	0

None of the teams were promoted or relegated due to the suspension of the competition

== See also ==
- 1945 Nemzeti Bajnokság I
