= Wekerletelepi SC =

Hungarian football club

- Full name: Wekerletelepi Sport Club
- Founded: 1913
- Dissolved: 1970
- Ground: WSC pálya
Home colours

Wekerletelepi Sport Club was professional football club based in Wekerletelep, Kispest, Hungary.

== History ==
In the 1910s, several of the outlying soccer fields in Budapest and its suburbs had a very bad reputation. The Újpest-Rákospalotai AK, or simply URAK, field in Rákospalota was the most notorious, while in the south, referees and visiting teams would have preferred to avoid matches in Wekerletelep. WSC first came into the spotlight in 1917, when one of three controversial matches in a league round was held in Kispest.

When Tibor Gallowich arrived in Wekerletelep in August 1940, the WSC was in the fourth division. The club had high expectations for Gallowich, and he delivered the success they had hoped for. Even then, they were well aware of his magical abilities—few could motivate the players the way he did. By then, he had already served as captain of both ILSZ and MILL, enjoyed the successful patronage of Gyurka Sárosi, and heroically led Tatabánya, Nemzeti SC, Kispest, Csepeli TK, Budafok FC, BSzKRT, WMFC, and Zuglói SE; he was coaching Vasas when he was approached by Wekerletelep. It was no trouble for Gallowich to work for two or even three clubs at once—soccer was his life. He didn’t hesitate this time either.

During the 1940–1941 season, he led the WSC youth team to the district championship title, while the “first” team won the championship in the Eastern Group of the fourth division (Budapest I). He parted ways with Vasas before the end of the season, in mid-April 1941, to take over as head coach of the NB II team BLK in May (while continuing his work at WSC, of course). Although the August 22 issue of *Nemzeti Sport* reported that Gallowich, “the distinguished coach, had parted ways with WSC,” he quickly changed his mind—he did not leave Wekerletelep.

At the start of the new season, the sports paper’s report on the “miracle team” and its “miracle coach” was right on time. “On the field, Coach Tibor Gallowich is working with the goalies, while elsewhere players are heading the ball, kicking, and passing. There are adults, juniors, and kids out there. There are plenty of Eskimos and not enough—balls. The coach dreams of having fifteen balls for a single practice. Wekerletelep, however, has yet to produce even a single true patron. Yet anyone who were to make a modest contribution to the budding soccer players of Wekerletelep would find joy here —wrote Nemzeti Sport in its September 16, 1941, article titled “Soccer Grows Here.” – The rag ball, swept away by this mechanized age, is still thriving in Wekerletelep. Of course, it’s cobbled together from scraps of stockings; it’s soft, doesn’t bounce, and if we add that it’s very dirty, we’ve described it well enough. The children are juggling. That is, they keep lifting the ball with one foot for as long as they can. And they can keep it up. One of them, a skinny, dark-skinned boy, has already surpassed two hundred, and I strongly suspect he only stops at 238 because he’s tired. Otherwise, he could keep going.”

Wekerletelep SC won the Mátra group of the 1941–42 Nemzeti Bajnokság III season and gained promotion to the second division. In their first season of the second division, they played in the Wessleényi group. Weekerletelep finished in the fifth position in the 1942–43 Nemzeti Bajnokság II season.

== Name changes ==
- Wekerletelepi Sport Club: 1913 – 1919
- Kispesti Állami Munkástelepi TE: 1919
- Wekerletelepi Sport Club: 1919 – 1945
- Wekerletelepi Munkás Testedző Egyesület: 1945
- Wekerletelepi SC Barátság: 1945 – 1946
- Wekerletelepi SC: 1946 – 1949
- 1948: merger with Szondi SC
- Férfiruhaipari WSC: 1949 – 1951
- Vörös Lobogó Férfiruhagyár SK: 1951 – 1956
- 1956: reestablished
- Wekerletelepi SC: 1956 – 1957
- 1957: merger with XIX.ker. Tatarozó Építők
- WSC Építők: 1957 – 1958
- Kispest-Wekerletelepi SC: 1958 – 1960
- Postajavító Wekerletelepi SC: 1960 – 1970

== Honours ==
=== League ===
- Nemzeti Bajnokság III:
  - Winners (1): 1941–42

== Seasons ==
The table below shows the seasons of Wekerletelepi SC.

Season	Tier	Club's name	Position	Pts
1913–14	3	Wekerletelepi SC	6 / 9	
1916–17	3	Wekerletelepi SC	5 / 14	15
1917–18	3	Wekerletelepi SC	2 / 8	15
1918–19	2	Wekerletelepi SC	12 / 12	11
1919–20	2	Wekerletelepi SC	8 / 17	36
1920–21	2	Wekerletelepi SC	13 / 14	11
1921–22	4	Wekerletelepi SC	1 / 16	60
1922–23	3	Wekerletelepi SC	6 / 15	26
1923–24	3	Wekerletelepi SC	6 / 15	33
1924–25	3	Wekerletelepi SC	7 / 14	25
1925–26	3	Wekerletelepi SC	7 / 14	27
1926–27	3	Wekerletelepi SC	3 / 14	35
1927–28	3	Wekerletelepi SC	7 / 17	41
1928–29	3	Wekerletelepi SC	14 / 16	13
1929–30	4	Wekerletelepi SC	9 / 12	21
1930–31	5	Wekerletelepi SC	1 / 14	39
1931–32	4	Wekerletelepi SC	2 / 16	43
1932–33	3	Wekerletelepi SC	3 / 14	34
1933–34	2	Wekerletelepi SC	6 / 12	21
1934–35	2	Wekerletelepi SC	3 / 12	28
1935–36	2	Wekerletelepi SC	7 / 13	27
1936–37	2	Wekerletelepi SC	11 / 12	15
1937–38	2	Wekerletelepi SC	11 / 14	20
1938–39	3	Wekerletelepi SC	4 / 14	31
1939–40	3	Wekerletelepi SC	9 / 13	20
1940–41	4	Wekerletelepi SC	1 / 13	36
1941–42	3	Wekerletelepi SC	1 / 16	54
1942–43	2	Wekerletelepi SC	5 / 14	28
1943–44	2	Wekerletelepi SC	8 / 15	26
1944–45	2	Wekerletelepi SC	7 / 16	8
1944–45	2	Wekerletelepi SC	0 / 11	
1945–46	2	Wekerletelepi SC Barátság	10 / 16	19
1945	2	Wekerletelepi MTE	7 / 12	25
1946–47	3	Wekerletelepi SC	5 / 14	30
1947–48	3	Wekerletelepi SC	14 / 16	16
1948–49	4	Wekerletelepi SC	11 / 15	21
1949–50	4	Férfiruhaipari WSC	14 / 16	17
1950	4	Férfiruhaipari WSC	11 / 16	9
1951	4	Vörös Lobogó Férfiruhagyár	11 / 12	
1952	4	Férfiruhaipar	14 / 16	18
1953	4	Vörös Lobogó Férfiruhagyár	15 / 16	7
1954	5	Vörös Lobogó Férfiruhagyár	5 / 11	21
1955	5	Férfiruhagyár	0 / 16	
1956	5	Férfiruhagyár	0 / 16	
1957–58	5	K. Wekerletelepi SC	6 / 16	33
1958–59	5	Kispest-Wekerletelepi SC	12 / 16	14
1959–60	5	Postajavító WSC	5 / 15	34
1960–61	5	Postajavító WSC	9 / 16	30
1961–62	5	Postajavító WSC	8 / 16	31
1962–63	5	Postajavító Wekerletelepi SC	9 / 16	28
1963	6	Postajavító Wekerletelepi SC	4 / 16	20
1964	6	Postajavító WSC	2 / 16	46
1965	5	Postajavító WSC	6 / 14	27
1966	5	Postajavító WSC	13 / 14	20
1967	5	Postajavító Wekerletelepi SC	13 / 16	24
1968	6	Postajavító Wekerletelepi SC	9 / 16	27
1969	6	Postajavító Wekerletelepi SC	14 / 16	16
1970	7	Postajavító	14 / 14	
