= Komáromi AC =

Hungarian football club

- Full name: Komáromi Atlétikai Club
- Founded: 1924
- Dissolved: 1989
Home colours

Komáromi Atlétikai Club is a defunct professional football club based in Komárom, Komárom-Esztergom County, Hungary.

== History ==
Komáromi AC won the Buda group of the 1942–43 Nemzeti Bajnokság III season and gained promotion to the second division.

== Name changes ==
- Újkomáromi FC/Komáromi FC: 1924 – 1940
- Komáromi AC: 1940 – 1945
- MÁV Komáromi AC: 1945 – 1948
- Komáromi Vasutas SE: 1948 – 1949
- Komáromi DSK: 1949 – 1951
- Komáromi Lokomotív SK: 1951 – 1955
- Komáromi Törekvés: 1955 – 1957
- MÁV Komáromi AC: 1957 – 1957
- 1957: merger with Komáromi Vörös Lobogó and Komáromi Mélyépítők
- Komáromi MÁV Textiles: 1957 – 1963
- Komáromi Textiles Sport Club: 1963 – 1967
- 1967: merger with Komáromi Olajmunkás SE
- 1972: reestablsihed
- Komáromi Atlétikai Club: 1972 – 1989

== Honours ==
=== League ===
- Nemzeti Bajnokság III:
  - Winners (1): 1942–43
- Megyei Bajnokság I: (4th level)
  - Winners (1): 1941–42

== Seasons ==
The highest league that Komáromi AC have ever played was the second division.

Season	Tier	Club's name	Position	Pts
1988–89	4	Komáromi AC	12 / 14	17
1987–88	4	Komáromi AC	7 / 16	31
1986–87	5	Komáromi AC	1 / 16	34
1985–86	4	Komáromi AC	14 / 18	28
1984–85	4	Komáromi AC	15 / 16	21
1983–84	4	Komáromi AC	13 / 17	23
1982–83	4	Komáromi AC	9 / 16	24
1981–82	4	Komáromi AC	12 / 16	22
1980–81	3	Komáromi AC	12 / 16	24
1979–80	3	Komáromi AC	10 / 16	23
1978–79	3	Komáromi AC	6 / 16	35
1977–78	4	Komáromi AC	3 / 16	41
1976–77	4	Komáromi AC	3 / 16	40
1975–76	4	Komáromi AC	14 / 16	21
1974–75	4	Komáromi AC	11 / 16	24
1973–74	5	Komáromi AC	9 / 16	28
1972–73	5	Komárom	12 / 16	24
1967	4	Komáromi Textiles	12 / 16	27
1966	4	Komáromi Textiles	7 / 16	29
1965	5	Komáromi Textiles SC	1 / 16	40
1964	4	Komáromi Textiles	13 / 17	22
1963	4	Komáromi Textiles	15 / 16	9
1962–63	3	Komáromi MÁV Textiles	13 / 16	23
1961–62	4	Komáromi Textiles	1 / 17	41
1960–61	4	Komáromi Textiles	2 / 15	39
1959–60	4	Komáromi MÁV Textiles	4 / 16	33
1958–59	4	Komáromi MÁV Textiles	3 / 13	35
1957–58	3	Komáromi MÁV Textiles	12 / 16	29
1957	3	MÁV Komáromi AC	2 / 6	13
1956	3	Komáromi Törekvés	11 / 16	24
1955	3	Komáromi Törekvés	15 / 16	25
1954	3	Komáromi Lokomotív	1 / 16	48
1953	3	Komáromi Lokomotív	5 / 18	34
1952	3	Komáromi Lokomotív	5 / 14	28
1951	3	Komáromi Lokomotív	1 / 10	32
1950	3	Komáromi DSK	10 / 16	14
1949–50	3	Komáromi DSK	14 / 16	26
1948–49	2	Komáromi VSE	16 / 16	15
1947–48	3	MÁV Komáromi AC	1 / 16	50
1946–47	3	MÁV Komáromi AC	2 / 12	36
1945–46	2	MÁV Komáromi AC	7 / 14	23
1944–45	2	Komáromi AC	6 / 14	10
1944–45	2	Komáromi AC	0 / 11	
1943–44	2	Komáromi AC	12 / 16	25
1942–43	3	Komáromi AC	1 / 14	48
1941–42	4	Komáromi AC	1 / 14	44
1940–41	4	Komáromi AC	3 / 14	30
1939–40	3	Újkomáromi FC	3 / 14	32
1938–39	3	Komáromi FC	3 / 14	32
1937–38	2	Komáromi FC	13 / 14	18
1936–37	2	Komáromi FC	10 / 13	21
1935–36	2	Komáromi FC	8 / 14	27
1934–35	3	Komáromi FC	1 / 11	
1933–34	3	Komáromi FC	1 / 9	30
1932–33	3	Komáromi FC	3 / 11	29
1931–32	3	Komáromi FC	8 / 11	17
1930–31	3	Komáromi FC	5 / 10	8
1929–30	3	Komáromi FC	9 / 13	13
1928–29	3	Komáromi FC	11 / 11	4
1927–28	3	Komáromi FC	6 / 11	19
1926–27	3	Komáromi FC	3 / 10	28
1925–26	3	Komáromi FC	2 / 11	31
1924–25	3	Komáromi FC	4 / 8	19
