= Újszegedi TC =

Hungarian football club

- Full name: Újszegedi Torna Club
- Founded: 1913
- Ground: UTC Sporttelep
- Website: https://utc1913.hu/
Home colours

Újszegedi Torna Club is professional football club based in Szeged, Csongrád-Csanád County, Hungary.

== History ==
The team now known as the Újszeged Gymnastics Club (UTC) was founded in 1913 (according to other sources, in 1911 or 1919): “According to my predecessors, the UTC was founded in 1913 out of the friendship and association of rose gardeners from Szőreg and Újszeged,” says Sándor Gidai, the club's current president, recounting its beginnings.

One of the iconic figures of the pre-war UTC era was Ferenc Lakatos, who played as a defender for 14 years, as well as Lajos Korányi, who earned 40 caps for the national team—he learned the basics of soccer on the team from childhood.

The political changes following the war had an impact in many areas. In line with the new spirit of the times and guiding principles, youth military training organizations were established throughout Szeged starting in the mid-1920s; as a result, independent teams and city sports clubs—including the UTC—created their own specialized sections. During their training, the cadets participated in mandatory drill exercises, target shooting, track and field, soccer, wrestling, and boxing.

The war also had an impact on the life of soccer and its structure up to that point. It was not until 1945 that the sport was reorganized and the first official matches were played. The first top-division championship in 1945 was again held exclusively for teams from the capital; in the provinces, local tournaments or regional championships were organized.

The newly formed Szeged Textiles Sports Association represents a major achievement in the development of high-quality sports. The new association was formed through the merger of the Hemp, Flax, and Jute Industry, the Szeged Hemp Spinning Mill, the Anglo-Hungarian Jute Spinning Mill, the Uniform Industry National Company, and the Rope-Making and Manufacturing National Company. The merger was announced with the unanimous approval of the participating companies.

Athletes from factories and companies realized that to develop high-quality sports, they needed to unite under one umbrella, as this is the only way to ensure the athletic development of textile workers in Szeged. The new club's first soccer and table tennis teams will compete in NB II this fall. In addition, they will ensure the development of both mass participation and high-level sports in boxing, track and field, volleyball, bowling, and chess. Szeged's sports community is watching the new sports club's operations with great interest.” (Délmagyarország, August 25, 1949.)

``The Újszeged Gymnastics Club has been reestablished in Szeged. Now that it has been revived, the Újszeged Hemp Factory is providing it with substantial support. However, the club’s leaders are also counting on financial contributions from the Újszeged community, particularly from fruit and flower growers. In the past, many famous soccer players began their careers at the UTC.

For example, the Korányi brothers also started playing sports here. Their soccer team competed in NB II for a long time, mostly with players they had trained themselves. The club’s leaders continue to regard player development as their most important task. They plan to hold a tryout for youth soccer players in the near future.” (Sport, January 20, 1957.)

The UTC, which trained on Temesvári Boulevard—on the site of today's City Sports Hall—until 1970, achieved its greatest successes during this period: In 1944, they triumphed 6–0 over TVE Hódmezővásárhely in the Csongrád County derby, with goals by Csöke (3), Szokoli, Burkus, and an own goal by Antal. The Újszegedi Torna Club was also a two-time first-division champion of Csongrád County, winning titles in both the 1957–1958 and 1962–1963 seasons.

UTC, which competed in Nemzet Bajnokság III, advanced to the final four of the 1964 Magyar Kupa by defeating Újpest, Csepel, and Vasas Izzó. After defeating both Újpesti Dózsa and Csepel, UTC was ultimately defeated by Budapest Honvéd in a hard-fought match.

In the 1970s, city officials decided to build an indoor arena on the site of the former sports field, so the club moved to Kertész Street. The new field was located next to the Kendergyár factory, which quickly took notice of the club—which trained young soccer players and had sections for handball, basketball, and outdoor recreation. The Kendergyár factory became the club's official sponsor and namesake.

In 1991, Sándor Gidai took over as head of the club, which had only 30 athletes. “They approached me in 1991, when it became clear that the UTC’s situation was becoming uncertain, and the factory (Szeged Hemp Factory) announced that it could not or would not continue to operate it. Since 1991, I have been in constant contact with the club and its leaders.

My official inauguration took place on February 22, 1992. When I arrived, the club had fewer than 30 soccer players in total, including both the adult and youth teams. “We built that up, and we first played in County Division II for a few years, then—with one interruption—in County Division I for two years, and now we’ve been playing continuously in the county’s top division for 11 years.” (Sándor Gidai)

Despite difficult financial circumstances, the new president managed to keep the team alive. What was once a single-division association has since grown into a four-division club. The real achievement is that UTC has survived and is still operating today, 30 years later.

== Name changes ==
- Újszegedi Torna Club: 1911 (1913?) – 1946
- Magyar Kender Újszegedi MTE: 1946 – 1948
- Újszegedi Torna Club: 1948 – 1949
- Újszegedi Textiles: 1949 – 1949
- Szegedi Textiles: 1949 – 1951
- Szegedi Vörös Lobogó Kender: 1951 – 1952
- Újszegedi Vörös Lobogó: 1952 – 1957
- Újszegedi Torna Club: 1957 – 1968
- Szegedi Kender Vállalat SC: 1968 – 1973
- Szegedi Kender Szövő Vállalat SE: 1973 – 1987
- Szegedi Magyar Kenderipari Sportegyesület: 1987
- merger with Mártély: 1990s
- Újszegedi TC: 1987 – 1999
- Autó 2000 SE: 1999 – 2001
- Újszegedi TC: 2001 – present

== Honours ==
=== League ===
- Nemzeti Bajnokság III:
  - Winners (1): 1942–43

== Seasons ==
The highest league that Újszegedi TC have ever played was the third tier.

Season	Tier	Club's name	Position	Pts
1919–20	2	Újszegedi TC	3 / 10	22
1920–21	2	Újszegedi TC	6 / 9	8
1922–23	2	Újszegedi TC	7 / 10	3
1923–24	2	Újszegedi TC	7 / 8	6
1924–25	2	Újszegedi TC	5 / 8	12
1925–26	2	Újszegedi TC	7 / 10	16
1926–27	2	Újszegedi TC	7 / 10	14
1927–28	2	Újszegedi TC	9 / 10	14
1928–29	2	Újszegedi TC	6 / 12	23
1929–30	2	Újszegedi TC	7 / 12	21
1930–31	2	Újszegedi TC	3 / 12	29
1931–32	2	Újszegedi TC	9 / 14	24
1932–33	2	Újszegedi TC	10 / 14	22
1933–34	2	Újszegedi TC	14 / 15	17
1934–35	3	Újszegedi TC	2 / 14	42
1935–36	3	Újszegedi TC	1 / 9	29
1936–37	3	Újszegedi TC	3 / 12	17
1937–38	3	Újszegedi TC	2 / 14	46
1938–39	3	Újszegedi TC	4 / 12	25
1939–40	3	Újszegedi TC	7 / 12	22
1940–41	4	Újszegedi TC	2 / 12	28
1941–42	4	Újszegedi TC	2 / 14	19
1942–43	3	Újszegedi TC	1 / 14	43
1943–44	2	Újszegedi TC	12 / 15	18
1944–45	2	Újszegedi TC	12 / 16	0
1944–45	2	Újszegedi TC	0 / 13	
1945–46	2	Újszegedi TC	12 / 14	13
1946–47	3	Újszegedi TC (közben MK UMTE)	3 / 14	34
1947–48	3	MK Újszegedi MTE	1 / 14	44
1948–49	2	Újszegedi TC	13 / 16	27
1949–50	2	Szegedi Textil	11 / 16	26
1950	2	Szegedi Textil	15 / 16	4
1951	3	Szegedi Vörös Lobogó Kender	11 / 15	19
1952	3	Újszegedi Vörös Lobogó Kender	5 / 14	34
1953	3	Újszegedi Vörös Lobogó	3 / 14	38
1954	3	Újszegedi Vörös Lobogó	4 / 16	36
1955	4	Újszegedi Vörös Lobogó	1 / 12	30
1956	3	Újszegedi Vörös Lobogó	4 / 16	40
1957	3	Újszegedi TC	5 / 10	19
1957–58	4	Újszegedi TC	1 / 16	47
1958–59	4	Újszegedi TC	4 / 16	37
1959–60	4	Újszegedi TC	2 / 17	42
1960–61	4	Újszegedi TC	6 / 18	33
1961–62	4	Újszegedi TC	2 / 16	42
1962–63	4	Újszegedi TC	1 / 17	41
1963	4	Újszegedi TC	14 / 16	12
1964	4	Újszegedi TC	3 / 16	37
1965	4	Újszegedi TC	13 / 16	27
1966	5	Újszegedi TC	5 / 16	29
1967	5	Újszegedi TC	2 / 14	40
1968	5	Szegedi Kender	7 / 14	27
1969	5	Szegedi Kender	3 / 14	32
1970	5	Szegedi Kender	2 / 14	17
1970–71	5	Szegedi Kender	7 / 14	29
1971–72	5	Szegedi Kender	3 / 14	29
1972–73	5	Szegedi Kender	4 / 14	31
1973–74	5	Szegedi KSZV SE	9 / 14	22
1974–75	4	Szegedi KSZV SE	11 / 16	21
1975–76	4	Szegedi KSZV SE	15 / 16	17
1976–77	4	Szegedi KSZV SE	9 / 16	26
1977–78	4	Szegedi KSZV SE	15 / 16	18
1978–79	3	Szegedi KSZV SE	14 / 16	21
1979–80	3	Szegedi KSZV SE	14 / 16	19
1980–81	3	Szegedi KSZV SE	4 / 16	41
1981–82	3	Szegedi KSZV SE	16 / 16	11
1982–83	4	Szegedi KSZV SE	14 / 16	22
1983–84	4	Szegedi KSZV SE	12 / 16	26
1984–85	4	Szegedi KSZV SE	11 / 16	25
1985–86	4	Szegedi KSZV SE	14 / 16	20
1986–87	4	Szegedi MKSE	15 / 16	17
1987–88	5	Újszegedi TC	5 / 16	34
1988–89	5	Újszegedi TC	3 / 16	40
1989–90	5	Újszegedi TC	11 / 16	35
1990–91	5	Újszegedi TC	3 / 16	38
1991–92	5	Újszegedi TC	5 / 16	35
1992–93	5	Újszegedi TC	5 / 16	38
1993–94	5	Újszegedi TC	9 / 16	27
1994–95	5	Újszegedi TC	14 / 16	28
1995–96	5	Újszegedi TC	13 / 16	33
1996–97	5	Újszegedi TC	9 / 16	36
1997–98	6	Újszegedi TC	7 / 17	49
1998–99	6	Újszegedi TC	17 / 18	27
1999–2000	7	Autó 2000 SE	2 / 16	63
2000–01	7	Autó 2000 SE	3 / 14	44
2001–02	6	UTC	14 / 15	22
2002–03	6	UTC	14 / 15	14
2003–04	6	Újszegedi TC	9 / 16	36
2004–05	6	Újszegedi TC	12 / 14	17
2005–06	5	Újszegedi TC	12 / 14	24
2006–07	5	Újszegedi TC	8 / 15	40
2007–08	5	Újszegedi TC	5 / 14	39
2008–09	5	Újszegedi TC	8 / 16	47
2009–10	5	Újszegedi TC	1 / 10	58
2010–11	4	Újszegedi TC	14 / 16	24
2011–12	4	Újszegedi TC	17 / 17	22
2012–13	4	Újszegedi TC	11 / 16	30
2013–14	4	Újszegedi TC	2 / 16	73
2014–15	4	Újszegedi TC 1913	6 / 16	47
2015–16	4	Újszegedi TC	11 / 17	33
2016–17	4	Újszegedi TC	12 / 15	24
2017–18	4	Újszegedi TC 1913	13 / 15	21
2018–19	4	Újszegedi TC 1913	11 / 15	30
2019–20	4	Újszegedi TC 1913	10 / 14	14
2020–21	4	Újszegedi TC 1913	14 / 14	7
2021–22	4	Újszegedi TC 1913	11 / 14	24
2022–23	4	Újszegedi TC 1913	12 / 12	15
2023–24	5	Újszegedi TC 1913	7 / 14	33
2024–25	5	Újszegedi TC 1913	9 / 14	34
2025–26	5	Újszegedi TC 1913	2 / 14	55
