= Marosvásárhelyi NMKTK =

Hungarian football club

- Full name: Marosvásárhelyi Nemzeti Munkaközpont TK
- Founded: 1911
- Ground: Erzsébetligeti pálya
Home colours

Marosvásárhelyi Nemzeti Munkaközpont TK is a defunct professional football club based in Târgu Mureș (in Hungarian: Marosvásárhely), Romania.

== History ==
During World War II, Hungary gained back some of its lost territories due to the Treaty of Trianon. Hungary could also gain back Northern Transylvania; therefore, football clubs in Târgu Mureș could participate in the Hungarian league system.

Marosvásárhelyi NMKTK entered the second division. The club finished in the second position of the Transylvania (North) group of the 1940–41 Nemzeti Bajnokság II season, as Marosvásárhelyi PMTE. In the subsequent season, the club entered the third division. Marosvásárhely won the Hargita group of the 1941–42 Nemzeti Bajnokság III season and gained promotion to the second division. Marosvásárhely finished in the eighth position of the Mátyás group of the 1942–43 Nemzeti Bajnokság II season. The group was won by Debreceni VSC. Marosvásárhely finished in the sixth position of the Eastern group of the 1943–44 Nemzeti Bajnokság II season. The following season was suspended to the World War II.

== Honours ==
=== League ===
- Nemzeti Bajnokság III:
  - Winners (1): 1941–42

== Seasons ==
The table below shows the seasons of Marosvásárhelyi NMKTK.

| Season | Tier | Club's name | Position | Pts |
|---|---|---|---|---|
| 1940–41 | 2 | Marosvásárhelyi PMTE | 2 / 5 | 9 |
| 1941–42 | 3 | Marosvásárhelyi NMKTK | 1 / 12 | 38 |
| 1942–43 | 2 | Marosvásárhelyi NMKTE | 8 / 10 | 16 |
| 1943–44 | 2 | Marosvásárhelyi NMKTE | 6 / 14 | 32 |
| 1944–45 | 2 | Marosvásárhelyi NMKTK | 0 / 8 | |
| 1944–45 | 2 | Marosvásárhelyi Nemzeti Munkaközpont TK | 0 / 11 | |
