= Ylinen Kassa =

Village in Norrbotten County, Sweden

- Village
- Location within Sweden
- Coordinates: 67°04′45″N 23°39′38″E
- Time zone: UTC+1

Ylinen Kassa is a village in the county of Norrbotten in Sweden.
