= Ferencvárosi TC II =

Hungarian football club

Faszállítók FC
- Full name: Ferencvárosi Torna Club II
- Nicknames: Fradi, Zöld Sasok (Green Eagles)
- Founded: 1899
- Ground: Groupama Arena; Budapest, Hungary
- Capacity: 23,500
- Chairman: Gábor Kubatov
- Manager: Mihály Tóth
- League: Nemzeti Bajnokság III (Közép)
- 2016–17: 12th
Home colours	Away colours

Ferencvárosi TC II is a Hungarian football club located in Budapest, Hungary. It currently plays in Nemzeti Bajnokság III. The team's colors are white and green.

== Honours ==
- Puskás Cup:
  - Winners (1): 2009
- Nemzeti Bajnokság III:
  - Winners (3): 1940–41, 2009–10, 2015–16

== Current squad ==
As of April 8, 2026

Note: Flags indicate national team as defined under FIFA eligibility rules; some limited exceptions apply. Players may hold more than one non-FIFA nationality.

No.	Pos.	Nation	Player
1	GK	HUN	Balázs Ulviczki
3	DF	HUN	Bálint Komáromi
4	DF	HUN	Marcell Orosz
5	FW	HUN	Gábor Kaszás
6	MF	HUN	Csongor Kokovai
7	DF	HUN	Kristóf Kovács
8	MF	HUN	Gergely Fenyvesi
9	MF	HUN	Zsombor Knáb
10	MF	HUN	Gergely Birkás
11	MF	UKR	Oleksii Serdiukov
12	MF	HUN	Áron Vén
14	DF	HUN	Boldizsár Vén
15	DF	USA	Griffin Garnett
16	MF	HUN	Zoltán Skotner

No.	Pos.	Nation	Player
17	FW	UKR	Daniel Kuznetsov
18	MF	HUN	Szilárd Lestál
19	DF	HUN	Ádám Farkas
20	DF	HUN	Zalán Ledniczky
21	DF	HUN	Bence Horváth
22	DF	HUN	Ádám Takács
23	DF	HUN	Máté Tóth
26	MF	HUN	Áron Vén
27	MF	HUN	Leon Lukács
28	FW	NGR	Ibrahim Alonge
29	DF	HUN	Zoltán Benczik
33	GK	HUN	Zalán Tóth
37	FW	HUN	Erik Berényi
54	FW	HUN	Norbert Kaján
71	DF	HUN	Csondor Lakatos
81	DF	GHA	Shadirac Chyreme Say

=== Out on loan ===
Note: Flags indicate national team as defined under FIFA eligibility rules; some limited exceptions apply. Players may hold more than one non-FIFA nationality.

No.	Pos.	Nation	Player
—	DF	USA	Zyen Jones (at (Slovakia) Spartak Trnava)
