= Sepsiszentgyörgyi Textil SE =

Hungarian football club

- Full name: Sepsiszentgyörgyi Textil Sport Egylet
- Founded: 1934
- Dissolved: 1945
Home colours

Sepsiszentgyörgyi Textil SE is a defunct professional football club based in Sfântu Gheorghe (in Hungarian: Sepsiszentgyörgy), Romania.

== History ==
During World War II, Hungary gained back some of its lost territories due to the Treaty of Trianon. Hungary could also gain back Northern Transylvania; therefore, football clubs in Sfântu Gheorghe could participate in the Hungarian league system.

Sepsiszentgyörgyi Textil SE entered the Hungarian league system in 1940 and they won the Souther Transylvania group of the 1940–41 Nemzeti Bajnokság II season.

== Honours ==
=== League ===
- Nemzeti Bajnokság II:
  - Winners (1): 1940–41

== Seasons ==
The highest league that Sepsiszentgyörgyi Textil SE have ever played was the third division.

1944–45	2	Sepsiszentgyörgyi Textil	0 / 5	
1944–45	3	Sepsiszentgyörgyi Textil SE	0 / 11	
1943–44	3	Sepsiszentgyörgyi Textil SE	2 / 5	9
1942–43	3	Sepsiszentgyörgyi Textil	2 / 7	16
1941–42	3	Sepsiszentgyörgyi Textil	4 / 12	26
1940–41	2	Sepsiszentgyörgyi Textil	1 / 5	15
