= Marosvásárhelyi SE =

Hungarian football club

- Full name: Marosvásárhelyi Sportegyesület
- Founded: 1898
- Ground: Erzsébetligeti pálya
Home colours

Marosvásárhelyi Sportegyesület is a defunct professional football club based in (in Hungarian: Marosvásárhely), Romania.

== History ==
Thanks to the First Vienna Award, Marosvásárhely (in Romanian: Târgu Mureș) belonged to Hungary again. The club was registered by the Hungarian Football Federation. The club could enter the Hungarian league system at the second level, Nemzeti Bajnokság II.

Although Marosvásárhely won the Transylvania group of the 1940–41 Nemzeti Bajnokság II season, the club did not gain promotion to the first division. Marosvásárhely spent four consecutive seasons in the second division. The 1944–45 Nemzeti Bajnokság II was suspended due to World War II.

== Honours ==
=== League ===
- Nemzeti Bajnokság II:
  - Winners (1): 1940–41 (Székelyföld group North)

== Seasons ==
The table below shows the seasons of Marosvásárhelyi SE.

Season	Tier	Club's name	Position	Pts
1908–09	2	Marosvásárhelyi SE	4 / 5	4
1909–10	2	Marosvásárhelyi SE	5 / 5	-
1911–12	2	Marosvásárhelyi SE	2 / 5	8
1912–13	2	Marosvásárhelyi SE	4 / 8	13
1913–14	2	Marosvásárhelyi SE	6 / 11	
1940–41	2	Marosvásárhelyi SE	1 / 5	13
1941–42	2	Marosvásárhelyi SE	6 / 14	30
1942–43	2	Marosvásárhelyi SE	4 / 10	19
1943–44	2	Marosvásárhelyi SE	8 / 14	29
1944–45	2	Marosvásárhelyi SE	0 / 8	
1944–45	2	Marosvásárhelyi SE	0 / 11	
