= List of Vasas SC seasons =

Vasas Sport Club is a professional football club based in Budapest, Hungary.

== Key ==
Nemzeti Bajnokság I

- Pld = Matches played
- W = Matches won
- D = Matches drawn
- L = Matches lost
- GF = Goals for
- GA = Goals against
- Pts = Points
- Pos = Final position

Hungarian football league system

- NBI = Nemzeti Bajnokság I
- NBII = Nemzeti Bajnokság II
- NBIII = Nemzeti Bajnokság III
- MBI = Megyei Bajnokság I

Magyar Kupa

- F = Final
- SF = Semi-finals
- QF = Quarter-finals
- R16 = Round of 16
- R32 = Round of 32
- R64 = Round of 64
- R128 = Round of 128
- 1R = First Round

UEFA

- F = Final
- SF = Semi-finals
- QF = Quarter-finals
- Group = Group stage
- PO = Play-offs
- QR3 = Third qualifying round
- QR2 = Second qualifying round
- QR1 = First qualifying round
- PR = Preliminary round

Winners	Runners-up	Third	Promoted	Relegated

== Seasons ==
As of 18 May 2026

Season	League										Cup	International		Manager	Ref.
Season	Tier	Div.	MP	W	D	L	GF	GA	Pts.	Pos.	Cup	Competition	Result	Manager	Ref.
1911–12	4	MBI	22	10	4	8			24	6th				(Hungary)	
1912–13	4	MBI	22	11	1	10	17	42	23	8th				(Hungary)	
1913–14	3	NBIII	24	8	6	10	20	30	22	7th				(Hungary)	
1915 Spring	2	NBII	11	9	1	1	32	11	19	1st				(Hungary)	
1915 Fall	2	NBII	11	11	0	0	46	4	22	1st				(Hungary)	
1916 Spring	2	NBII	6				12	8	6	3rd				(Hungary)	
1916–17	1	NBI	22	6	9	7	29	30	21	6th				(Hungary)	
1917–18	1	NBI	22	11	5	6	37	26	27	4th				(Hungary)	
1918–19	1	NBI	21	9	6	6	20	19	24	4th				(Hungary)	
1919–20	1	NBI	28	10	9	9	31	26	29	6th				(Hungary)	
1920–21	1	NBI	24	5	8	11	20	30	18	11th				(Hungary)	
1921–22	1	NBI	22	7	6	9	24	33	20	7th				(Hungary)	
1922–23	1	NBI	22	10	8	4	37	31	28	4th				(Hungary)	
1923–24	1	NBI	22	7	4	11	28	36	18	9th				(Hungary)	
1924–25	1	NBI	22	10	7	5	38	25	27	3rd				(Hungary)	
1925–26	1	NBI	22	11	7	4	58	47	29	3rd				(Hungary)	
1926–27	1	NBI	18	7	4	7	27	32	18	6th				(Hungary)	
1927–28	1	NBI	22	6	2	14	37	57	14	10th				(Hungary)	
1928–29	1	NBI	22	5	4	13	26	68	14	11th				(Hungary)	
1929–30	2	NBII ↑	24	17	5	2	71	23	39	2nd				(Hungary)	
1930–31	1	NBI	22	6	5	11	41	52	17	8th				(Hungary)	
1931–32	1	NBI	22	5	3	14	41	69	13	11th				(Hungary)	
1932–33	2	NBII	26	22	2	2	85	19	46	2nd				(Hungary)	
1933–34	2	NBII	26	13	5	8	59	46	31	5th				(Hungary)	
1934–35	2	NBII	24	11	6	7	48	42	28	6th				(Hungary)	
1935–36	2	NBII	26	11	5	10	63	83	27	8th				(Hungary)	
1936–37	2	NBII	22	7	6	9	46	65	20	7th				(Hungary)	
1937–38	2	NBII	26	2	0	24	22	154	4	14th				(Hungary)	
1938–39	2	NBII	26	9	5	12	37	54	23	11th				(Hungary)	
1932–33	2	NBII	26	22	2	2	85	19	46	2nd				(Hungary)	
1939–40	2	NBII	22	12	3	7	39	40	27	4th				(Hungary)	
1940–41	2	NBII	26	12	6	8	51	43	30	4th				(Hungary)	
1941–42	2	NBII ↑	26	18	6	2	62	20	42	1st				(Hungary)	
1942–43	1	NBI	30	14	5	11	64	49	33	6th				(Hungary) Gallowich	
1943–44	1	NBI	30	8	11	11	54	61	27	13th				(Hungary) Gallowich	
1945	1	NBI	22	10	7	5	69	38	27	5th				(Hungary) Guttmann	
1945–46	1	NBI	26	18	2	6	86	49	38	2nd				(Hungary)	
1946–47	1	NBI	30	16	7	7	77	43	39	3rd				(Hungary)	
1947–48	1	NBI	32	22	7	3	76	31	51	2nd				(Hungary) Gallowich	
1948–49	1	NBI	30	15	2	13	68	51	32	7th				(Hungary)	
1949–50	1	NBI	30	15	5	10	67	44	35	6th				(Hungary)	
1950	1	NBI	15	8	1	6	30	23	17	6th				(Hungary)	
1951	1	NBI	26	11	7	8	47	33	29	4th				(Hungary) Jeny	
1952	1	NBI	26	13	7	6	54	40	33	4th				(Hungary) Jeny	
1953	1	NBI	26	14	4	8	62	37	32	3rd				(Hungary) Baróti	
1954	1	NBI	26	11	7	8	49	51	29	4th				(Hungary) Baróti	
1955	1	NBI	26	16	4	6	62	39	36	4th	W			(Hungary) Baróti	
1956	1	NBI	17	5	6	6	28	28	16	8th		Mitropa Cup	W	(Hungary) Baróti	
		1956 Hungarian uprising													
1957	1	NBI	11	7	3	1	36	14	17	1st		Mitropa Cup	W	(Hungary) Baróti	
1957–58	1	NBI	26	9	10	7	38	32	28	5th		European Cup	SF	(Hungary) Illovszky	
1958–59	1	NBI	26	12	9	5	30	22	33	4th		Did not qualify		(Hungary) Illovszky	
1959–60	1	NBI	26	12	7	6	44	29	32	3rd		Did not qualify		(Hungary) Illovszky	
1960–61	1	NBI	26	15	8	3	59	24	38	1st		Did not qualify		(Hungary) Illovszky	
1961–62	1	NBI	26	17	4	5	55	27	38	1st		European Cup	PR	(Hungary) Illovszky	
1962–63	1	NBI	26	8	9	9	37	31	25	9th		European Cup	1R	(Hungary) Illovszky	
1963	1	NBI	13	6	2	5	19	16	14	5th		Did not qualify		(Hungary) Illovszky	
1964	1	NBI	26	12	7	7	44	31	31	6th		Did not qualify		(Hungary) Illovszky	
1965	1	NBI	26	17	5	4	48	19	39	1st		Did not qualify		(Hungary) Illovszky	
1966	1	NBI	26	17	9	0	67	27	43	1st		Did not qualify		(Hungary) Csordás	
1967	1	NBI	30	16	6	8	71	37	38	4th		European Cup	2R	(Hungary) Csordás	
1968	1	NBI	30	18	6	6	66	37	42	3rd		European Cup	QF	(Hungary) Illovszky	
1969	1	NBI	30	18	3	9	72	43	39	4th		Did not qualify		(Hungary) Illovszky	
1970	1	NBI	14	7	4	3	19	13	18	5th		Did not qualify		(Hungary) Illovszky	
1970–71	1	NBI	30	19	3	8	61	25	47	3rd		Did not qualify		(Hungary) Machos	
1971–72	1	NBI	30	12	8	10	51	46	32	6th		UEFA Cup	2R	(Hungary) Machos	
1972–73	1	NBI	30	16	8	6	54	33	40	3rd	W	Did not qualify		(Hungary) Baróti	
1973–74	1	NBI	30	9	14	7	35	31	32	8th		Cup Winners' Cup	1R	(Hungary) Baróti	
1974–75	1	NBI	28	10	7	11	43	46	27	6th		Did not qualify		(Hungary) Illovszky	
1975–76	1	NBI	30	15	4	11	65	41	34	5th		UEFA Cup	3R	(Hungary) Illovszky	
1976–77	1	NBI	34	25	3	6	100	45	53	1st		Did not qualify		(Hungary) Illovszky	
1977–78	1	NBI	34	15	12	7	58	42	42	5th		European Cup	1R	(Hungary) Illovszky	
1978–79	1	NBI	34	16	10	8	62	49	42	4th		Did not qualify		(Hungary) Mészöly	
1979–80	1	NBI	34	17	10	7	75	52	44	3rd	R	Did not qualify		(Hungary) Mészöly	
1980–81	1	NBI	34	18	10	6	68	38	46	3rd	W	UEFA Cup	1R	(Hungary) Bundzsák	
1981–82	1	NBI	34	12	8	14	57	54	32	12th		Cup Winners' Cup	2R	(Hungary) Bundzsák	
1982–83	1	NBI	30	11	6	13	56	52	28	7th		Did not qualify		(Hungary) Bundzsák	
1983–84	1	NBI	30	14	5	11	46	40	33	6th		Did not qualify		(Hungary) Mészöly	
1984–85	1	NBI	30	10	11	9	56	44	31	5th		Did not qualify		(Hungary) Illovszky	
1985–86	1	NBI	30	11	7	12	37	43	29	9th	W	Did not qualify		(Hungary) Illovszky	
1986–87	1	NBI	30	13	6	11	42	40	32	6th		Cup Winners' Cup	1R	(Hungary) Kisteleki	
1987–88	1	NBI	30	9	11	10	33	37	29	9th		Did not qualify		(Hungary) Kisteleki	
1988–89	1	NBI	30	10	7	13	35	56	35	14th^{1}		Did not qualify		(Hungary) Mészöly	
1989–90	1	NBI	30	10	9	11	35	42	39	8th		Did not qualify		(Hungary) Mészöly	
1990–91	1	NBI	30	8	8	14	32	43	24	12th		Did not qualify		(Hungary) Mészöly	
1991–92	1	NBI	30	10	13	7	40	29	33	6th		Did not qualify		(Hungary) Gellei	
1992–93	1	NBI	30	7	13	10	31	33	27	10th		Did not qualify		(Hungary) Gellei	
1993–94	1	NBI	30	8	8	14	36	43	24	10th		Did not qualify		(Hungary) Mészöly	
1994–95	1	NBI	30	10	7	13	38	45	37	10th		Did not qualify		(Hungary) Mészöly, Illovszky	
1995–96	1	NBI	30	12	10	8	44	40	46	7th		Did not qualify		(Hungary) Gellei	
1996–97	1	NBI	34	19	7	8	50	33	64	4th		Did not qualify		(Hungary) Gellei	
1997–98	1	NBI	34	19	7	8	66	41	64	3rd		Did not qualify		(Hungary) Gellei	
1998–99	1	NBI	34	15	10	9	51	44	55	6th		Did not qualify		(Hungary) Gellei	
1999–00	1	NBI	32	19	4	9	58	32	61	3rd	R	Did not qualify		(Hungary) Komjáti	
2000–01	1	NBI	22	10	6	6	42	33	40	3rd		UEFA Cup	1R	(Hungary) Komjáti	
2001–02	1	NBI ↓	38	7	11	20	51	78	32	12th		Did not qualify		(Hungary) Kiss, (Hungary) Tornyi	
2002–03		2002-03 Nemzeti Bajnokság II - results deleted													
2003–04	2	NBII ↑	34	18	8	8	57	36	62	2nd	SF	Did not qualify		(Hungary) Tamási, (Hungary) Egervári	
2004–05	1	NBI	30	10	3	17	34	48	33	13th	R16	Did not qualify		(Hungary) Egervári	
2005–06	1	NBI	30	5	10	15	32	47	25	15th	R	Did not qualify		(Hungary) Pintér	
2006–07	1	NBI	30	13	6	11	43	41	45	5th	SF	Did not qualify		(Hungary) Mészöly	
2007–08	1	NBI	30	12	5	13	42	45	41	10th	QF	Did not qualify		(Hungary) Mészöly	
2008–09	1	NBI	30	11	5	14	42	52	38	10th	R32	Did not qualify		(Hungary) Mészöly	
2009–10	1	NBI	30	8	7	15	39	61	31	13th	3R	Did not qualify		(Italy) Dellacasa	
2010–11	1	NBI	30	11	7	12	34	46	40	11th	R16	Did not qualify		(Hungary) Komjáti	
2011–12	1	NBI ↓	30	5	9	16	29	51	22	15th	R32	Did not qualify		(Croatia) Vlak	
2012–13	2	NBII	30	17	4	9	49	34	55	2nd	SF	Did not qualify		(Portugal) Machado, (Hungary) Szapor	
2013–14	2	NBII	30	16	4	10	59	43	52	4th	1R	Did not qualify		(Germany) Berger, (Hungary) Szanyó	
2014–15	2	NBII ↑	30	21	3	6	68	31	66	1st	R128	Did not qualify		(Hungary) Szanyó	
2015–16	1	NBI	33	9	5	19	32	54	32	10th	R32	Did not qualify		(Hungary) Szanyó, (Germany) Oenning	
2016–17	2	NBI	33	15	7	11	50	40	52	3rd	R	Did not qualify		(Germany) Oenning	
2017–18	2	NBI ↓	33	9	7	17	38	61	34	12th	R64	Europa League	1QR	(Germany) Oenning	
2018–19	2	NBII	38	18	11	9	73	64	65	4th	R16	Did not qualify		(Hungary) Szanyó	
2019–20	2	NBII	27	14	5	8	55	39	47	3rd	R16	Did not qualify		(Hungary) Szanyó, (Hungary) Bene	
2020–21	2	NBII	38	23	9	6	65	35	78	3rd	R16	Did not qualify		(Hungary) Bene, (Hungary) Tóth, (Hungary) Schindler	
2021-22	2	NBII ↑	38	25	10	3	80	22	85	1st	R16	Did not qualify		(Hungary) Kuttor	
2022–23	1	NBI	33	4	14	15	29	43	26	12th	SF	Did not qualify		(Hungary) Kuttor, (Hungary) Kondás, (Hungary) Desits	
2023–24	2	NBII	34	19	10	5	72	33	67	3rd	QF	Did not qualify		(Hungary) Desits, (Hungary) Gera	
2024–25	2	NBII	30	16	4	10	47	35	52	3rd	R64	Did not qualify		(Hungary) Gera, (Hungary) Pintér	
2025–26	2	NBII ↑	30	20	4	6	59	26	64	1st				(Hungary) Erős	

Notes

- Note 1: Relegation play-off in 1988–89 Nemzeti Bajnokság I: Vasas 1-1 Szegedi EAC (Fáy utca, 18.06.1989) and Szegedi EAC 0-1 Vasas (Szeged, 25.06.1989).

== See also ==
- The Invincibles (football)
