= List of Kispest-Honvéd FC seasons =

Budapest Honvéd Football Club is a professional football club based in Budapest, Hungary.

== Key ==
Nemzeti Bajnokság I

- Pld = Matches played
- W = Matches won
- D = Matches drawn
- L = Matches lost
- GF = Goals for
- GA = Goals against
- Pts = Points
- Pos = Final position

Hungarian football league system

- NBI = Nemzeti Bajnokság I
- NBII = Nemzeti Bajnokság II
- NBIII = Nemzeti Bajnokság III
- MBI = Megyei Bajnokság I

Magyar Kupa

- F = Final
- SF = Semi-finals
- QF = Quarter-finals
- R16 = Round of 16
- R32 = Round of 32
- R64 = Round of 64
- R128 = Round of 128

UEFA

- F = Final
- SF = Semi-finals
- QF = Quarter-finals
- Group = Group stage
- PO = Play-offs
- QR3 = Third qualifying round
- QR2 = Second qualifying round
- QR1 = First qualifying round
- PR = Preliminary round

Winners	Runners-up	Third	Promoted	Relegated

== Seasons ==
As of 17 May 2026.

Season	League										Cup	International		Manager	Ref.
Season	Tier	Div.	Pld	W	D	L	GF	GA	Pts.	Pos.	Cup	Competition	Result	Manager	Ref.
1909–10	2	NBII	4	2	0	2	3	5	4	2nd		No competition held			
1910–11	4	IV ↑	12	7	2	3	19	13	16	3rd		No competition held			
1911–12	3	III	22	7	4	11	25	51	18	8th		No competition held			
1912–13	3	III	22	18	1	3	67	20	37	1st		No competition held			
1913–14	2	III	?	?	?	?	?	?	?	2nd		No competition held			
1916–17	1	NBI	22	5	4	13	22	57	14	11th		No competition held		(Hungary)	
1917–18	1	NBI	22	2	8	12	26	48	12	11th		No competition held		(Hungary)	
1918–19	1	NBI	22	8	1	13	27	52	17	8th		No competition held		(Hungary)	
1919–20	1	NBI	28	19	5	4	52	21	43	2nd		No competition held		(Hungary)	
1920–21	1	NBI	24	5	11	8	24	28	21	7th		No competition held		(Hungary)	
1921–22	1	NBI	22	2	10	10	15	36	14	10th		No competition held		(Hungary)	
1922–23	1	NBI	22	3	9	10	15	28	15	10th		No competition held		(Hungary)	
1923–24	1	NBI	22	5	8	9	18	33	18	10th		No competition held		(Hungary)	
1924–25	1	NBI	22	6	7	9	20	28	19	8th		No competition held		(Hungary)	
1925–26	1	NBI	22	8	5	9	47	51	21	6th	W	No competition held		(Hungary)	
1926–27	1	NBI	18	3	7	8	24	37	13	9th		Did not qualify		(Hungary)	
1927–28	1	NBI	22	6	3	13	39	61	15	9th		Did not qualify		(Hungary)	
1928–29	1	NBI	22	5	6	11	27	48	16	9th		Did not qualify		(Hungary)	
1929–30	1	NBI	22	6	7	9	21	39	19	6th		Did not qualify		(Hungary)	
1930–31	1	NBI	22	6	4	12	40	55	16	10th	TBD	Did not qualify		(Hungary)	
1931–32	1	NBI	22	4	6	12	29	54	14	9th		Did not qualify		(Hungary)	
1932–33	1	NBI	22	6	7	9	40	55	19	7th		Did not qualify		(Hungary)	
1933–34	1	NBI	22	7	5	10	43	50	19	6th		Did not qualify		(Hungary)	
1934–35	1	NBI	22	8	7	7	41	50	23	5th		Did not qualify		(Hungary) Stalmach	
1935–36	1	NBI	26	12	5	6	60	56	29	5th		Did not qualify		(Hungary) Stalmach	
1936–37	1	NBI	26	8	5	13	62	78	21	10th		Did not qualify		(Hungary) Stalmach	
1937–38	1	NBI	26	15	1	10	72	59	31	4th		Mitropa Cup	R16	(Hungary) Puskás	
1938–39	1	NBI	26	15	4	7	62	42	34	4th		Did not qualify		(Hungary) Puskás	
1939–40	1	NBI	26	14	5	7	70	41	33	5th		Did not qualify		(Hungary) Puskás	
1940–41	1	NBI	26	9	4	13	56	68	22	10th		Did not qualify		(Hungary) Puskás	
1941–42	1	NBI	30	12	3	15	67	89	27	11th		Did not qualify		(Hungary) Puskás	
1942–43	1	NBI	30	10	6	14	55	63	26	9th		Did not qualify		(Hungary) Titkos	
1943–44	1	NBI	30	11	6	13	66	64	28	10th		Did not qualify		(Hungary) Szokodi	
1945	1	NBI	22	14	2	6	74	55	30	4th		Did not qualify		(Hungary) Puskás	
1945–46	1	NBI	22	12	5	9	66	44	29	4th		Did not qualify		(Hungary) Puskás	
1946–47	1	NBI	30	17	7	6	77	37	41	2nd		Did not qualify		(Hungary) Puskás	
1947–48	1	NBI	32	21	6	5	82	42	48	4th		Did not qualify		(Hungary) Guttmann	
1948–49	1	NBI	30	19	3	8	94	46	41	3rd		Did not qualify		(Hungary) Guttmann, (Hungary) Puskás	
1949–50	1	NBI	30	23	4	3	84	29	50	1st		Did not qualify		(Hungary) Puskás	
1950	1	NBI	15	13	1	1	67	16	27	1st		Did not qualify		(Hungary) Puskás	
1951	1	NBI	26	18	6	2	83	26	42	2nd		Did not qualify		(Hungary) Puskás	
1952	1	NBI	26	21	5	0	88	21	47	1st		Did not qualify		(Hungary) Kalmár	
1953	1	NBI	26	19	5	2	86	27	43	2nd		Did not qualify		(Hungary) Kalmár	
1954	1	NBI	26	19	2	5	100	43	40	1st		Did not qualify		(Hungary) Kalmár	
1955	1	NBI	26	20	5	1	99	47	45	1st	R	Mitropa Cup	SF	(Hungary) Kalmár	
1956	1	NBI	21	13	3	5	52	29	29	^{1}		European Cup	R1	(Hungary) Kalmár	
1957	1	NBI	11	1	3	7	19	27	5	11th		Did not qualify		(Hungary) Kiss	
1957–58	1	NBI	26	14	6	6	53	30	34	2nd		Did not qualify		(Hungary) Sós	
1958–59	1	NBI	26	13	7	6	46	25	33	3rd		Mitropa Cup	W	(Hungary) Sós	
1959–60	1	NBI	26	9	7	10	48	44	25	7th		Did not qualify		(Hungary) Sós	
1960–61	1	NBI	26	7	10	9	41	43	24	9th		Did not qualify		(Hungary) Babolcsay	
1961–62	1	NBI	26	10	6	10	43	39	26	7th		Did not qualify		(Hungary) Babolcsay	
1962–63	1	NBI	26	11	7	8	53	38	29	5th		Did not qualify		(Hungary) Lóránt	
1963	1	NBI	13	7	3	3	30	12	17	2nd		Did not qualify		(Hungary) Bányai	
1964	1	NBI	26	17	4	5	62	31	38	2nd	W	Cup Winners' Cup	R1	(Hungary) Kispéter	
1965	1	NBI	26	12	6	7	47	30	31	4th		Cup Winners' Cup	QF	(Hungary) Kispéter	
1966	1	NBI	26	14	3	9	46	43	31	6th		Mitropa Cup	R16	(Hungary) Bozsik	
1967	1	NBI	30	9	10	11	46	49	28	6th		Did not qualify		(Hungary) Babolcsay	
1968	1	NBI	30	13	12	5	50	30	38	4th	R	Mitropa Cup	R16	(Hungary) Preiner	
1969	1	NBI	30	18	8	4	66	28	44	2nd	R	Mitropa Cup	SF	(Hungary) Preiner	
1970	1	NBI	14	8	2	4	26	9	18	3rd^{2}		Did not qualify		(Hungary) Preiner	
1970–71	1	NBI	30	14	8	8	54	37	43	4th		Cup Winners' Cup	R2	(Hungary) Preiner	
1971–72	1	NBI	30	16	7	7	51	26	39	2nd		Did not qualify		(Hungary)	
1972–73	1	NBI	30	12	11	7	60	37	35	4th	R	UEFA Cup	R2	(Hungary)	
1973–74	1	NBI	30	14	6	10	54	36	34	6th		UEFA Cup	R3	(Hungary)	
1974–75	1	NBI	28	16	10	2	53	21	42	2nd		Did not qualify		(Hungary)	
1975–76	1	NBI	30	14	8	8	47	32	36	4th		UEFA Cup	R2	(Hungary)	
1976–77	1	NBI	34	19	8	7	62	43	46	4th		UEFA Cup	R2	(Hungary)	
1977–78	1	NBI	34	22	6	6	67	22	50	2nd		Did not qualify		(Hungary)	
1978–79	1	NBI	34	16	9	9	57	39	41	5th		UEFA Cup	QF	(Hungary)	
1979–80	1	NBI	34	19	10	5	67	38	48	1st		Did not qualify		(Hungary) Tichy	
1980–81	1	NBI	34	15	12	7	56	36	42	5th		European Cup	R2	(Hungary)	
1981–82	1	NBI	34	15	9	10	54	40	39	6th		Did not qualify		(Hungary)	
1982–83	1	NBI	30	17	8	5	57	33	42	3rd	R	Did not qualify		(Hungary)	
1983–84	1	NBI	30	19	6	5	63	24	42	1st		UEFA Cup	R2	(Hungary) Komora	
1984–85	1	NBI	30	20	6	4	63	25	46	1st	W	European Cup	R1	(Hungary) Komora	
1985–86	1	NBI	30	17	11	2	63	29	45	1st		European Cup	R2	(Hungary) Komora	
1986–87	1	NBI	30	15	5	10	47	39	35	4th		European Cup	R1	(Hungary)	
1987–88	1	NBI	30	15	7	6	48	23	41	1st	R	UEFA Cup	R3	(Hungary) Bicskei	
1988–89	1	NBI	30	16	6	1	44	28	61	1st	W	European Cup	R1	(Hungary) Bicskei, (Hungary) Both	
1989–90	1	NBI	30	9	8	13	31	39	35	13th^{3}	R	European Cup	R2	(Hungary)	
1990–91	1	NBI	30	19	7	4	50	20	45	1st		Did not qualify		(Hungary) Mezey	
1991–92	1	NBI	30	19	4	7	61	27	42	3rd		European Cup	R2	(Hungary)	
1992–93	1	NBI	30	19	5	6	59	28	43	1st		Did not qualify		(Finland) Kuusela	
1993–94	1	NBI	30	18	7	5	66	33	43	2nd	R	Champions League	R1	(Finland) Kuusela	
1994–95	1	NBI	30	14	6	10	60	42	48	4th		UEFA Cup	R2	(Hungary)	
1995–96	1	NBI	30	12	10	8	49	35	46	6th	W	Did not qualify		(Hungary)	
1996–97	1	NBI	34	12	9	13	43	36	49	6th		Cup Winners' Cup	R1	(Hungary) Bicskei, (Hungary) Varga	
1997–98	1	NBI	34	10	6	18	41	57	36	14th		Did not qualify		(Hungary) Komora	
1998–99	1	NBI	34	11	9	14	38	50	42	12th		Did not qualify		(Hungary) Gálhidi, (Hungary) Komora	
1999–00	1	NBI	34	10	9	13	27	39	39	12th		Did not qualify		(Hungary) Reszeli Soós	
2000–01	1	NBI	22	9	6	7	33	31	34	7th		Did not qualify		(Hungary) Tornyi	
2001–02	1	NBI	38	12	11	15	51	70	47	7th		Did not qualify		(Hungary) Glázer, (Hungary) Détári	
2002–03	1	NBI ↓	32	8	5	19	43	66	29	11th		Did not qualify		(Hungary) Szurgent, (Hungary) Őze, (Hungary) Dúró	
2003–04	2	NBII ↑	34	23	6	5	75	24	75	1st		Did not qualify		(Hungary) Gálhidi	
2004–05	1	NBI	30	10	5	15	37	58	35	11th	SF	UEFA Cup	QR2	(Hungary) Bognár, (Hungary) Szurgent, (Hungary) Gergely	
2005–06	1	NBI	30	8	9	13	33	52	33	13th	SF	Did not qualify		(Italy) Dolcetti	
2006–07	1	NBI	30	11	8	11	48	43	41	8th	W	Did not qualify		(Hungary) Supka	
2007–08	1	NBI	30	12	7	11	45	36	43	8th	R	UEFA Cup	QR2	(Hungary) Supka	
2008–09	1	NBI	30	8	8	14	45	36	43	8th	W	Did not qualify		(Hungary) Pölöskei, (Hungary) Sisa	
2009–10	1	NBI	30	9	11	10	38	35	38	9th	SF	Europa League	QR1	(Hungary) Sisa, (Italy) Morales	
2010–11	1	NBI	30	11	7	12	36	39	40	10th	QF	Did not qualify		(Italy) Morales, (Hungary) Supka	
2011–12	1	NBI	30	13	7	10	48	40	46	4th	R3	Did not qualify		(Hungary) Supka	
2012–13	1	NBI	30	15	7	8	50	36	52	3rd	QF	Europa League	QR2	(Italy) Rossi	
2013-14	1	NBI	30	10	6	14	37	39	36	9th	R16	Europa League	QR2	(Italy) Rossi	
2014–15	1	NBI	30	6	10	14	26	36	28	13th	R16	Did not qualify		(Italy) Vierchowod, (Hungary) Csábi, (Italy) Rossi	
2015–16	1	NBI	33	12	7	14	40	39	43	8th	R16	Did not qualify		(Italy) Rossi	
2016–17	1	NBI	33	20	5	8	55	30	65	1st	R16	Did not qualify		(Italy) Rossi	
2017–18	1	NBI	33	13	8	12	50	53	47	4th	QF	Champions League	QR2	(Netherlands) van der Meer, (Hungary) Supka	
2018–19	1	NBI	33	13	10	10	46	38	49	4th	R	Europa League	QR2	(Hungary) Supka	
2019–20	1	NBI	33	12	8	13	36	44	44	5th	W	Did not qualify		(Italy) Sannino, (Hungary) Pisont	
2020–21	1	NBI	33	9	10	14	46	48	37	10th	R16	Europa League	QR2	(Hungary) Bódog, (Hungary) Horváth	
2021–22	1	NBI	33	10	8	15	48	51	38	9th	QF	Did not qualify		(Hungary) Horváth, (Serbia) Vignjević	
2022–23	1	NBI ↓	33	8	9	16	34	51	33	11th	R16	Did not qualify		(Scotland) Courts (Croatia) Klafurić	
2023–24	2	NBII	38	11	11	12	39	36	44	9th	R32	Did not qualify		(Hungary) Pintezits, (Bosnia and Herzegovina) Kamber	
2024–25	2	NBII	30	11	7	12	41	39	40	8th		Did not qualify		(Hungary) Laczkó, (Hungary) Feczkó	
2025–26	2	NBII ↑	30	18	5	7	49	26	59	2nd		Did not qualify		(Hungary) Feczkó	
2026–27	1	NBI												(Switzerland) Maurizio Jacobacci	

†: defunct Italics indicate that the season is still in progress.

Notes

- Note 1: the 1956 Nemzeti Bajnokság I was abandoned due to the 1956 Hungarian uprising
- Note 2: in 1970 Honvéd won the third place play-off against MTK Budapest on 6-2 aggregate
- Note 3: in 1989-90 Nemzeti Bajnokság I Honvéd finished 13th and won the play-offs on 3-2 aggregate against Kazincbarcikai Vegyész

== See also ==
- The Invincibles (football)
