= List of Szombathelyi Haladás seasons =

Hungarian football club

Szombathelyi Haladás is a professional football club based in Szombathely, Hungary.

== Key ==
Nemzeti Bajnokság I

- Pld = Matches played
- W = Matches won
- D = Matches drawn
- L = Matches lost
- GF = Goals for
- GA = Goals against
- Pts = Points
- Pos = Final position

Hungarian football league system

- NBI = Nemzeti Bajnokság I
- NBII = Nemzeti Bajnokság II
- NBIII = Nemzeti Bajnokság III
- MBI = Megyei Bajnokság I

Magyar Kupa

- F = Final
- SF = Semi-finals
- QF = Quarter-finals
- R16 = Round of 16
- R32 = Round of 32
- R64 = Round of 64
- R128 = Round of 128

UEFA

- F = Final
- SF = Semi-finals
- QF = Quarter-finals
- Group = Group stage
- PO = Play-offs
- QR3 = Third qualifying round
- QR2 = Second qualifying round
- QR1 = First qualifying round
- PR = Preliminary round

Winners	Runners-up	Third	Promoted	Relegated

== Seasons ==
As of 12 July 2025

Season	League									Cup	International		Manager	Ref
Season	Div.	MP	W	D	L	GF	GA.	Pts.	Pos.	Cup	Competition	Result	Manager	Ref
1936–37	NBI ↓	26	6	4	16	38	79	16	12th		Did not qualify		(Hungary)	
	Nemzeti Bajnokság II													
1939–40	NBI	26	10	2	14	44	59	22	11th		Did not qualify		(Hungary)	
1940–41	NBI ↓	26	5	5	16	37	68	15	14th		Did not qualify		(Hungary)	
	Nemzeti Bajnokság II													
1942–43	NBI ↓	30	8	7	15	60	92	23	14th		Did not qualify		(Hungary)	
	Nemzeti Bajnokság II													
1945–46	NBI	18	6	1	11	29	27	13	10th		Did not qualify		(Hungary)	
1946–47	NBI	30	11	6	13	49	47	28	11th		Did not qualify		(Hungary)	
1947–48	NBI	32	13	7	12	49	48	33	7th		Did not qualify		(Hungary)	
1948–49	NBI	30	11	6	13	56	60	28	10th		Did not qualify		(Hungary)	
1949–50	NBI	30	10	4	16	52	67	24	12th		Did not qualify		(Hungary)	
1950	NBI	15	3	6	6	16	26	12	11th		Did not qualify		(Hungary)	
1951	NBI	26	8	2	16	29	59	18	12th		Did not qualify		(Hungary)	
1952	NBI	26	8	7	11	34	48	23	7th		Did not qualify		(Hungary)	
1953	NBI	26	11	4	11	38	54	26	7th		Did not qualify		(Hungary)	
1954	NBI	26	8	7	11	32	49	23	10th		Did not qualify		(Hungary)	
1955	NBI	26	9	4	13	41	57	22	10th		Did not qualify		(Hungary)	
1956	NBI ↓	21	6	4	11	24	35	16	10th		Did not qualify		(Hungary)	
	Hungarian Uprising of 1956													
1957	NBI	11	1	2	8	14	32	4	12th		Did not qualify		(Hungary)	
1958–59	NBI	26	8	10	8	35	35	26	8th		Did not qualify		(Hungary)	
1958–59	NBI	26	8	8	10	26	39	22	10th		Did not qualify		(Hungary)	
1959–60	NBI ↓	26	6	7	3	32	47	19	13th		Did not qualify		(Hungary)	
1960–61	NBII	30	16	5	9	53	31	37	2nd		Did not qualify			
1961–62	NBII ↑	30	21	5	4	68	24	47	1st		Did not qualify			
1962–63	NBI ↓	26	4	5	17	23	49	13	14th		Did not qualify		(Hungary)	
1963	NBII	15	7	4	4	23	17	18	5th		Did not qualify			
1964	NBII	30	11	11	8	52	38	33	4th		Did not qualify			
1965	NBII	30	17	4	9	59	30	38	3rd		Did not qualify			
1966	NBII ↑	30	11	12	7	47	33	34	4th		Did not qualify			
1967	NBI	30	10	5	15	42	60	25	12th		Did not qualify		(Hungary) Tátrai	
1968	NBI	30	9	8	13	36	45	26	10th		Did not qualify		(Hungary)	
1969	NBI	30	7	11	12	26	44	25	11th		Did not qualify		(Hungary)	
1970	NBI	14	3	5	6	13	22	11	12th^{1}		Did not qualify		(Hungary)	
1970–71	NBI	30	9	7	14	40	52	28	13th		Did not qualify		(Hungary)	
1971–72	NBI ↓	30	4	5	21	27	63	13	16th		Did not qualify		(Hungary)	
1972–73	NBII ↑	34	18	10	6	67	31	46	1st		Did not qualify			
1973–74	NBI	30	8	7	15	31	47	23	13th		Did not qualify		(Hungary)	
1974–75	NBI	28	8	6	14	28	44	22	13th	R	Did not qualify		(Hungary)	
1975–76	NBI	30	11	7	11	36	43	29	7th		UEFA CWC	2R	(Hungary)	
1976–77	NBI	34	14	8	12	53	49	36	5th		Did not qualify		(Hungary)	
1977–78	NBI	34	9	10	15	43	56	28	14th		Did not qualify		(Hungary)	
1978–79	NBI ↓	34	9	5	20	40	74	23	17th		Did not qualify		(Hungary)	
1979–80	NBII	38	24	7	7	94	38	55	2nd		Did not qualify			
1980–81	NBII ↑	38	20	17	1	92	37	57	1st		Did not qualify			
1981–82	NBI	34	13	9	12	46	42	35	9th		Did not qualify		(Hungary)	
1982–83	NBI	30	10	8	12	33	40	28	8th		Did not qualify		(Hungary)	
1983–84	NBI	30	10	6	14	29	42	26	13th		Did not qualify		(Hungary)	
1984–85	NBI	30	10	9	11	32	34	29	9th		Did not qualify		(Hungary)	
1985–86	NBI	30	9	9	12	34	37	27	10th		Did not qualify		(Hungary)	
1986–87	NBI	30	11	8	11	32	33	30	9th		Did not qualify		(Hungary)	
1987–88	NBI	30	9	13	8	39	37	31	7th		Did not qualify		(Hungary)	
1988–89	NBI	30	12	4	14	31	44	35	13th^{2}		Did not qualify		(Hungary)	
1989–90	NBI ↓	30	9	6	15	33	46	33	15th		Did not qualify		(Hungary)	
1990–91	NBII ↑	30	18	7	5	58	26	43	1st		Did not qualify			
1991–92	NBI ↓	30	7	8	15	27	42	22	13th		Did not qualify		(Hungary)	
1992–93	NBII ↑	30	17	8	5	43	16	42	1st		Did not qualify			
1993–94	NBI ↓	30	5	9	16	28	48	19	15th		Did not qualify		(Hungary)	
1994–95	NBII ↑	30	20	2	8	56	25	62	1st		Did not qualify			
1995–96	NBI	30	8	8	14	30	48	32	12th		Did not qualify		(Hungary)	
1996–97	NBI	34	10	10	14	39	42	40	10th		Did not qualify		(Hungary)	
1997–98	NBI	34	9	9	16	38	47	36	13th		Did not qualify		(Hungary)	
1998–99	NBI	34	10	6	18	39	54	36	14th		Did not qualify		(Hungary)	
1999–00	NBI	32	8	8	16	37	53	32	13th		Did not qualify		(Hungary)	
2000–01	NBI	14	3	4	7	14	24	13	7th		Did not qualify		(Hungary)	
2001–02	NBI ↓	38	9	13	16	48	71	40	11th	R	Did not qualify		(Hungary)	
2002–03	NBII ↑	34	17	11	6	55	28	62	2nd		Did not qualify			
2003–04	NBI ↓	32	4	11	17	19	63	23	12th		Did not qualify		(Hungary) Détári, (Hungary) Gujdár	
2004–05	NBII	26	8	4	14	28	38	28	13th		Did not qualify			
2005–06	NBII	30	12	6	12	38	37	42	6th		Did not qualify			
2006–07	NBII	30	21	5	4	66	25	60	2nd		Did not qualify			
2007–08	NBII ↑	30	21	8	1	68	19	71	1st		Did not qualify			
2008–09	NBI	30	16	5	9	44	29	53	3rd	R16	Did not qualify		(Hungary) Csertői	
2009–10	NBI	30	10	9	11	46	49	39	8th	R16	Europa League	2QR	(Hungary) Róth	
2010–11	NBI	30	11	8	11	42	36	41	8th	R16	Did not qualify		(Hungary) Róth, (Hungary) Csertői	
2011–12	NBI	30	9	11	10	39	37	38	8th	R16	Did not qualify		(Hungary) Aczél, (Hungary) Artner	
2012–13	NBI	30	11	11	8	36	27	44	8th	R32	Did not qualify		(Hungary) Artner	
2013–14	NBI	30	12	10	8	37	31	46	6th	R16	Did not qualify		(Hungary) Artner	
2014–15	NBI	30	7	4	19	26	53	25	14th	R32	Did not qualify		(Hungary) Artner, (Hungary) Szentes ^{3}, (Hungary) Mészöly	
2015–16	NBI	33	13	11	9	33	37	50	5th	R16	Did not qualify		(Hungary) Mészöly	
2016–17	NBI	33	12	7	14	42	46	43	6th	R32	Did not qualify		(Hungary) Mészöly	
2017–18	NBI	33	11	5	17	35	50	38	8th	R64	Did not qualify		(Hungary) Mészöly, (Hungary) Pacsi, (Slovakia) Hipp	
2018–19	NBI ↓	33	8	6	19	31	51	30	12th		Did not qualify		(Hungary) Horváth	
2019–20	NBII	27	7	9	11	32	34	30	17th		Did not qualify		(Hungary) Supka, (Hungary) Desits, (Hungary) Mátyus	
2020–21	NBII	38	14	12	12	50	42	54	11th		Did not qualify		(Hungary) Németh	
2021–22	NBII	38	16	9	13	37	30	57	6th		Did not qualify			
2022–23	NBII	38	14	9	15	54	56	51	9th		Did not qualify		(Hungary) Mészöly, (Slovakia) Hipp	
2023–24	NBII ↓	34	9	11	14	42	52	38	14th		Did not qualify		(Serbia) Jović	
2024–25	NBIII	29	6	11	13	37	54	29	13th		Did not qualify			
2024–25	NBIII	0	0	0	0	0	0	0	TBD	TBD	Did not qualify		(Hungary) Vígh	

Notes

- Note 1: Play-off Videoton FC 7–1 Haladás, and Haladás 3–1 Videoton FC
- Note 2: Relegation play-off: Oroszlányi Bányász 2–0 Haladás on 18 June 1989, Haladás 4–1 Oroszlányi Bányász on 24 June 1989.
- Note 3: Attila Kuttor as interim manager
