= Ferenc Bene jr. =

Hungarian footballer and manager

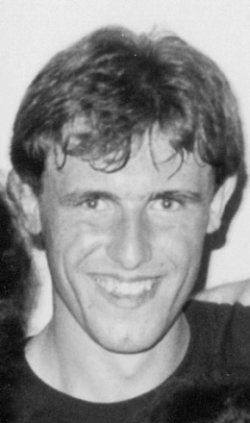
- Bene in 1998

Personal information
- Full name: Ferenc Bene jr.
- Date of birth: 7 September 1978 (age 48)
- Place of birth: Budapest, Hungary
- Position: Forward

Senior career*
Years	Team	Apps	(Gls)
1996–1998	Vasas SC	0	(0)
1998–1999	Dorogi FC	28	(12)
1999–2000	BKV Előre SC	21	(4)
2000	FC Jazz	22	(1)
2001–2003	BKV Előre SC	39	(7)
2002–2003	Soroksári TE	14	(6)

Managerial career
- 2006–2007: Felsőpakony KSE
- 2007–2010: Kozármisleny SE
- 2009–2011: Hungary U-17, U-18
- 2011–2012: Lombard-Pápa TFC
- 2012–2014: Diósgyőri VTK (assistant)
- 2015–2016: Gyirmót FC
- * Club domestic league appearances and goals

Ferenc Bene jr. (born 7 September 1978) is a Hungarian football manager and a former footballer who currently works as an assistant coach for Diósgyőri VTK in the Hungarian premier division OTP Bank Liga. He is the son of legendary Hungarian striker Ferenc Bene.

During his playing career Bene spent several seasons in the Hungarian lower divisions and played one season in the Finnish top division Veikkausliiga for FC Jazz as a forward.
