= Hungarian football clubs in European competitions =

- Points by season (UEFA coefficient)
Season	Points
2009-10	2.750
2010-11	2.750
2011-12	2.250
2012-13	3.000
2013-14	0.875
2014-15	2.125
2015-16	1.625
2016-17	1.875
2017-18	1.625
2018-19	3.250
2019-20	4.500
2020-21	4.250
2021-22	2.750
2022-23	5.875
2023-24	4.500
2024-25	6.625

Hungarian football clubs have participated in European association football competitions (UEFA Champions League/European Cup, Europa League/UEFA Cup/Inter-Cities Fairs Cup, and defunct UEFA Cup Winners Cup) since their inception in 1955, when MTK, Vasas SC and Budapest Honvéd FC played in the inaugural Inter-Cities Fairs Cup.

The only Hungarian club to have won a major European trophy is Ferencváros, having defeated Juventus 1–0 in Turin to lift the Inter-Cities Fairs Cup 1964-65.

Teams representing Hungary's NB I have reached the final of a major European competition on six occasions, with Ferencváros having done so thrice, thus being the only multiple time finalist, and the only team to reach the final in different competitions. Hungarian football clubs appearing in major European finals, in chronological order:

(Hungary) Hungarian European Cup Finalists
Year	Opponent	Score	Cup	Hungarian Club
1963-64	(Portugal) Sporting Lisbon	3-4 (L)	UEFA Cup Winners' Cup	(Hungary) MTK
1964-65	(Italy) Juventus	1-0 (W)	Inter-Cities Fairs Cup	(Hungary) Ferencváros
1967-68	(England) Leeds United	0-1 (L)	Inter-Cities Fairs Cup	(Hungary) Ferencváros
1968-69	(England) Newcastle United	2-6 (L)	Inter-Cities Fairs Cup	(Hungary) Újpesti Dózsa
1974-75	(Soviet Union) Dynamo Kyiv	0-3 (L)	UEFA Cup Winners' Cup	(Hungary) Ferencváros
1984-85	(Spain) Real Madrid	1-3 (L)	UEFA Cup	(Hungary) Videoton Székesfehérvár

During the historical European Cup era, three clubs succeeded in reaching the semi-final stage of the competition, each on one occasion. In the 1957-58 season Vasas Budapest; in the 1964-65 season Győr; and in the 1973-74 season Újpest.

In the modern Champions League era, under the current format, Hungarian clubs have qualified for the group stage on three occasions: Ferencváros twice, in the 1995-96 then 2020-21 seasons, as well as Debrecen in the 2009–10 season.

Ferencváros finished at the top of their group in the 2022–23 UEFA Europa League, resulting in their progress into the knockout phase, marking the first time since Vidi's defeat at the hands of Real Madrid in the 1985 UEFA Cup Final that a Hungarian club has reached the latter portion of a major European tournament. Since then, Ferencváros managed to reach the knockout phase of the 2023–24 UEFA Europa Conference League and 2024–25 UEFA Europa League.

== Statistics ==
- Most European Cup/Champions League competitions appeared in: 14 – Ferencváros
- Most UEFA Cup/Europa League competitions appeared in: 11 –
- Most Cup Winners' Cup competitions appeared in: 2 –
- Most Intertoto Cup competitions appeared in: 5 –
- Most competitions appeared in overall: 22 –
- First match played: Vörös Lobogó SE 6–3 Anderlecht (1955–56 European Cup R1)
- Most matches played: 72 –
- Most match wins: 21 –
- Most match draws: 17 –
- Most match losses: 39 –
- Biggest win (match): ? goals
  - 6–0 (2005–06 UEFA Champions League QR1)
  - 6–0 (2010–11 UEFA Europa League QR1)
  - 6–0 (2017–18 UEFA Europa League QR1)
- Biggest win (aggregate): ? goals
  - 11–0 (2010–11 UEFA Europa League QR1)
- Biggest defeat (match): ? goals
  - 7–0 (1998 UEFA Intertoto Cup R2)
- Biggest defeat (aggregate): ? goals
  - 0–11 (2005–06 UEFA Cup QR2)

As of 8 August 2018.

=== Who qualifies for UEFA competitions ===
Competition	Who qualifies	Notes
UEFA Champions League Second qualifying round	Club finishing 1st in the Nemzeti Bajnokság I	
UEFA Europa League First qualifying round	Club finishing 2nd in the Nemzeti Bajnokság I	
UEFA Europa League First qualifying round	Club finishing 3rd in the Nemzeti Bajnokság I	
UEFA Europa League First qualifying round	Magyar Kupa winners	

== European champions ==
European Cup/ Champions League	UEFA Cup/Europa League	Inter-Cities Fairs Cup	Intertoto Cup	Cup Winners Cup	Super Cup
None	None	1964–65 – Ferencváros	None	None	None

=== UEFA coefficient and ranking ===
For the 2023–24 UEFA competitions, the associations will be allocated places according to their 2022 UEFA country coefficients, which will take into account their performance in European competitions from 2017–18 to 2021–22. In the 2022 rankings that will be used for the 2023–24 European competitions, Hungary's coefficient points total is 16.375. After earning a score of 2.750 during the 2021–22 European campaign, Hungary is ranked by UEFA as the 27th best association in Europe out of 55.

- 25 Romania 17.125
- 26 Azerbaijan 17.000
- 27 Hungary 16.375
- 28 Poland 15.875
- 29 Kazakhstan 15.750
  - Full list

=== UEFA country coefficient history ===
(As of 2 September 2022), Source: Bert Kassies website.

Coefficient ranking (1960-2009)
Accumulated	Valid	Rank	Movement	Coefficient	Change
1955–56 to 1959–60	1961–62	7	Steady	24.500	Steady
1956–57 to 1960–61	1962–63	9	▼ –2	22.500	▼ –2.000
1957–58 to 1961–62	1963–64	4	▲ +5	29.500	▲ +7.000
1958–59 to 1962–63	1964–65	11	▼ –7	23.833	▼ –5.667
1959–60 to 1963–64	1965–66	7	▲ +4	27.833	▲ +4.000
1960–61 to 1964–65	1966–67	5	▲ +2	36.333	▲ +8.500
1961–62 to 1965–66	1967–68	3	▲ +2	39.999	▲ +3.666
1962–63 to 1966–67	1968–69	4	▼ –1	38.332	▼ –1.667
1963–64 to 1967–68	1969–70	2 (top)	▲ +2	43.665	▲ +5.333
1964–65 to 1968–69	1970–71	2	Steady	53.665 (top)	▲ +10.000
1965–66 to 1969–70	1971–72	2	Steady	46.415	▼ –7.250
1966–67 to 1970–71	1972–73	2	Steady	40.999	▼ –5.416
1967–68 to 1971–72	1973–74	2	Steady	41.666	▲ +1.667
1968–69 to 1972–73	1974–75	5	▼ –3	34.500	▼ –7.166
1969–70 to 1973–74	1975–76	14	▼ –9	21.500	▼ –13.000
1970–71 to 1974–75	1975–76	11	▲ +3	24.750	▲ +3.250

Coefficient ranking (2010- )
Accumulated	Valid	Rank	Movement	Coefficient	Change
2005–06 to 2009–10	2011–12	36	Steady	6.750	Steady
2006–07 to 2010–11	2012–13	32	▲ +4	8.500	▲ +1.750
2007–08 to 2011–12	2013–14	29	▲ +3	9.750	▲ +1.250
2008–09 to 2012–13	2014–15	29	Steady	11.750	▲ +2.000
2009–10 to 2013–14	2015–16	28	▲ +1	11.625	▼ –0.125
2010–11 to 2014–15	2016–17	31	▼ –3	11.000	▼ –0.625
2011–12 to 2015–16	2017–18	33	▼ –2	9.875	▼ –1.125
2012–13 to 2016–17	2018–19	33	Steady	9.500	▼ –0.375
2013–14 to 2017–18	2019–20	36	▼ –3	8.125	▼ –1.375
2014–15 to 2018–19	2020–21	33	▲ +3	10.500	▲ +2.375
2015–16 to 2019–20	2021–22	33	Steady	11.375	▲ +0.875
2016–17 to 2020–21	2022–23	28	▲ +5	15.500	▲ +4.125
2017–18 to 2021–22	2023–24	27	▲ +1	16.375	▲ +0.875

== Full European record ==
=== UEFA Champions League/European Cup ===
Year	Team	Progress	Score	Opponents	Venue(s)
1955–56	Vörös Lobogó	QF	6–8	(France) Stade Reims	2–4 at Parc de Princes, 4–4 at Hungária körúti stadion
1956–57	Budapest Honvéd	1R	5–6	(Spain) Athletic Bilbao	2–3 at San Mamés, 3–3 at Heysel Stadium
1957–58	Vasas	SF	2–4	(Spain) Real Madrid	0–4 at Santiago Bernabéu Stadium, 2–0 at Népstadion
1958–59	MTK Budapest	1R	2–6	(Switzerland) Young Boys	1–2 at Népstadion, 1–4 at Wankdorf Stadium
1959–60	Csepel	PR	3–4	(Turkey) Fenerbahçe	1–1 at Mithat Paşa Stadium, 2–3 at Népstadion
1960–61	Újpesti Dózsa	1R	4–7	(Portugal) Benfica	2–6 at Estádio da Luz, 2–1 at Népstadion
1961–62	Vasas	PR	1–5	(Spain) Real Madrid	0–2 at Népstadion, 1–3 at Santiago Bernabéu Stadium
1962–63	Vasas	1R	3–3^{1}	(Netherlands) Feyenoord	1–1 at De Kuip, 2–2 at Népstadion
1963–64	Ferencváros	PR	2–4	(Turkey) Galatasaray	0–4 at Mithat Paşa Stadium, 2–0 at Üllői úti stadion
1964–65	Vasas ETO Győr	SF	0–5	(Portugal) Benfica	0–1 at Népstadion, 0–4 at Estádio da Luz
1965–66	Ferencváros	QF	1–5	(Italy) Internazionale	0–4 at San Siro, 1–1 at Népstadion
1966–67	Vasas	2R	1–4	(Italy) Internazionale	1–2 at San Siro, 0–2 at Népstadion
1967–68	Vasas	QF	0–3	(Portugal) Benfica	0–0 at Népstadion, 0–3 at Estádio da Luz
1968–69	Ferencváros	^{2}			
1969–70	Ferencváros	2R	0–6	(England) Leeds United	0–3 at Elland Road, 0–3 at Népstadion
1970–71	Újpesti Dózsa	1R	2–4	(Socialist Federal Republic of Yugoslavia) Red Star Belgrade	2–0 at Megyeri úti Stadium, 0–4 at Stadion Crvena Zvezda
1971–72	Újpesti Dózsa	QF	2–3	(Scotland) Celtic	1–2 at Megyeri úti Stadium, 1–1 at Celtic Park
1972–73	Újpesti Dózsa	QF	2–2 (a)	(Italy) Juventus	0–0 at Stadio delle Alpi, 2–2 at Megyeri úti Stadium
1973–74	Újpesti Dózsa	SF	1–4	(West Germany) Bayern Munich	1–1 at Népstadion, 0–3 at Olympic Stadium
1974–75	Újpesti Dózsa	2R	1−5	(England) Leeds United	1−2 at Megyeri úti Stadium, 0−3 at Elland Road
1975–76	Újpesti Dózsa	2R	5–6	(Portugal) S.L. Benfica	2–5 at Estádio da Luz, 3–1 at Megyeri úti Stadium
1976–77	Ferencváros	2R	1–4	(East Germany) Dynamo Dresden	1–0 at Üllői úti stadion, 0–4 at Rudolf-Harbig-Stadium
1977–78	Vasas	1R	1–4	(West Germany) Borussia Mönchengladbach	0–3 at Népstadion, 1–1 at Bökelbergstadion
1978–79	Újpesti Dózsa	1R	2–4	(Czechoslovakia) Zbrojovka Brno	2–2 at Městský stadion, 0–2 at Megyeri úti Stadium
1979–80	Újpesti Dózsa	1R	3–4	(Czechoslovakia) Dukla Prague	3–2 at Megyeri úti Stadium, 0–2 at Stadion Letná
1980–81	Budapest Honvéd	2R	0–3	(Spain) Real Madrid	0–1 at Santiago Bernabéu Stadium, 0–2 at Kispest Stadion
1981–82	Ferencváros	1R	3–5	(Czechoslovakia) Baník Ostrava	3–2 at Üllői úti stadion, 0–3 at Bazaly
1982–83	Rába ETO Győr	1R	3–5	(Belgium) Standard Liège	0–5 at Stade Maurice Dufrasne, 3–0 at Stadion ETO
1983–84	Rába ETO Győr	2R	4–9	(Soviet Union) Dinamo Minsk	3–6 at Stadion ETO, 1–3 at Dinamo Stadium
1984–85	Budapest Honvéd	1R	3–4	(Switzerland) Grasshopper Zürich	1–3 at Hardturm, 2–1 at Kispest Stadion
1985–86	Budapest Honvéd	2R	2–4	(Romania) Steaua București	1–0 at Kispest Stadion, 1–4 at Stadionul Steaua
1986–87	Budapest Honvéd	1R	3–6	(Denmark) Brøndby	1–4 at Brøndby Stadium, 2–2 at Bozsik Stadion
1987–88	MTK Hungária	1R	2–4	(Romania) Steaua București	0–4 at Stadionul Steaua, 2–0 at Hungária körúti stadion
1988–89	Budapest Honvéd	1R	1–4	(Scotland) Celtic	1–0 at Bozsik Stadion, 0–4 at Celtic Park
1989–90	Budapest Honvéd	2R	0–9	(Portugal) Benfica	0–2 at Bozsik Stadion, 0–7 at Estádio da Luz
1990–91	Újpesti Dózsa	1R	0–5	(Italy) Napoli	0–3 at Stadio San Paolo, 0–2 at Megyeri úti Stadium
1991–92	Budapest Honvéd	2R	3–4	(Italy) Sampdoria	2–1 at Bozsik Stadion, 1–3 at Stadio Luigi Ferraris
1992–93	Ferencváros	1R	1–4	(Czechoslovakia) Slovan Bratislava	1–4 at Tehelné pole, 0–0 at Üllői úti stadion
1993–94	Kispest Honvéd	1R	3–5	(England) Manchester United	2–3 at Bozsik Stadion, 1–2 at Old Trafford
1994–95	Vác	QR	1−5	(France) Paris Saint-Germain	0−3 at Parc des Princes, 1−2 at Stadion Rudolf Illovszky
1995–96	Ferencváros	3rd in GS	N/A	(Netherlands) Ajax, (Spain) Real Madrid, (Switzerland) Grasshopper	
1996–97	Ferencváros	QR	1–4	(Sweden) Göteborg	0–3 at Norrköpings Idrottspark, 1–1 at Üllői úti stadion
1997–98	MTK Hungária	2QR	1–4	(Norway) Rosenborg	0–1 at Hidegkuti Nándor Stadium, 1–3 at Lerkendal Stadion
1998–99	Újpest	2QR	2–7	(Austria) Sturm Graz	0–4 at Stadion Graz-Liebenau, 2–3 at Ferenc Szusza Stadium
1999–00	MTK Hungária	3QR	0–2	Croatia Zagreb	0–0 at Stadion Maksimir, 0–2 at Hidegkuti Nándor Stadium
2000–01	Dunaferr	3QR	3–4	(Norway) Rosenborg	2–2 at Stadion ETO, 1–2 at Lerkendal Stadion
2001–02	Ferencváros	2QR	0–0 (4–5 p)	(Croatia) Hajduk Split	0–0 at Stadion Albert Flórián, 0–0 at Stadion Poljud
2002–03	Zalaegerszeg	3QR	1–5	(England) Manchester United	1–0 at Ferenc Puskás Stadium, 0–5 at Old Trafford
2003–04	MTK Hungária	3QR	0–5	(Scotland) Celtic	0–4 at Ferenc Puskás Stadium, 0–1 at Celtic Park
2004–05	Ferencváros	3QR	1–2 (aet)	(Czech Republic) Sparta Prague	1–0 at Üllői úti stadion, 0–2 at Letná Stadion
2005–06	Debrecen	3QR	0–6	(England) Manchester United	0–3 at Old Trafford, 0–3 at Ferenc Puskás Stadium
2006–07	Debrecen	2QR	2–5	(North Macedonia) Rabotnički	1–1 at Stadion Oláh Gábor Út, 1–4 at Philip II Arena
2007–08	Debrecen	2QR	0–1	(Sweden) Elfsborg	0–1 at Stadion Oláh Gábor Út, 0–0 at Borås Arena
2008–09	MTK Hungária	2QR	0–7	(Turkey) Fenerbahçe	0–2 at Şükrü Saracoğlu Stadium, 0–5 at Megyeri úti Stadium
2009–10	Debrecen	4th in GS	N/A	(Italy) Fiorentina, (France) Lyon, (England) Liverpool	
2010–11	Debrecen	3QR	1–5	(Switzerland) Basel	0–2 at Szusza Ferenc Stadium, 1–3 at St. Jakob-Park
2011–12	Videoton	2QR	3–4	(Austria) Sturm Graz	0–2 at Hypo-Arena, 3–2 at Sóstói Stadion
2012–13	Debrecen	3QR	1–3	(Belarus) BATE Borisov	1–1 at Haradski Stadium, 0–2 at Városi Stadion
2013–14	Győr	2QR	1–4	(Israel) Maccabi Tel Aviv	0–2 at ETO Park, 1–2 at Bloomfield Stadium
2014–15	Debrecen	3QR	2–3	(Belarus) BATE Borisov	1–0 at Nagyerdei Stadion, 1–3 at Borisov Arena
2015–16	Videoton	3QR	1–2	(Belarus) BATE Borisov	1–1 at Sóstói Stadion, 0–1 at Borisov Arena
2016–17	Ferencváros	2QR	2–2 (1–3 p.)	(Albania) FK Partizani Tirana	1–1 at Elbasan Arena, 1–1 at Groupama Aréna
2017–18	Budapest Honvéd	2QR	3–5	(Israel) Hapoel Be'er Sheva	1–2 at Turner Stadium, 2–3 at Bozsik Stadion
2018–19	Vidi	PO	2−3	(Greece) AEK Athens	1−2 at Groupama Aréna^{3}, 1−1 at Olympic Stadium
2019–20	Ferencváros	3QR	1−5	(Croatia) Dinamo Zagreb	1–1 at Stadion Maksimir, 0−4 at Groupama Aréna
2020–21	Ferencváros	4th in GS	N/A	(Spain) Barcelona, (Ukraine) Dynamo Kyiv, (Italy) Juventus	
2021–22	Ferencváros	PO	4−6	(Switzerland) Young Boys	2–3 at Stadion Wankdorf, 2−3 at Groupama Aréna
2022–23	Ferencváros	3QR	2−4	(Azerbaijan) Qarabağ	1–1 at Tofiq Bahramov Republican Stadium, 1−3 at Groupama Aréna
2023–24	Ferencváros	1QR	0−3	(Faroe Islands) KÍ Klaksvik	0–0 at Við Djúpumýrar, 0−3 at Groupama Aréna
2024–25	Ferencváros	3QR	1−3	(Denmark) Midtjylland	0–2 at MCH Arena, 1−1 at Groupama Aréna
2025–26	Ferencváros	PO	4−5	(Azerbaijan) Qarabağ	2–3 at Tofiq Bahramov Republican Stadium, 1−3 at Groupama Aréna

Notes

- Note 1: Feyenoord beat Vasas 1–0 in a playoff to qualify for the quarter-finals of the 1962-63 European Cup.
- Note 2: A number of Eastern European clubs withdrew from the first two rounds when UEFA paired up all of the Eastern European clubs against one another.
- Note 3: Vidi played their home match at Pancho Aréna and Groupama Arena due to the reconstruction of Sóstói Stadion.
- SF: Semi-final
- QF: Quarter-final
- GS: Group stage
- R: Round
- QR: Qualifying round
- PR: Preliminary round
- PO: Play-off round

=== UEFA Cup/UEFA Europa League ===
Year	Team	Progress	Score	Opponents	Venue(s)
2012–13	Videoton	3rd in GS	N/A	(Belgium) Genk, (Switzerland) Basel, (Portugal) Sporting	
2012–13	Budapest Honvéd	2QR	0–5	(Russia) Anzhi Makhachkala	0–1 Saturn Stadium, 0–4 at Bozsik Stadion
2012–13	MTK Budapest	1QR	2–3	(Slovakia) Senica	1–1 at Hidegkuti Nándor Stadium, 1–2 at Štadión FK Senica
2012–13	Debrecen^{3}	PO	1–7	(Belgium) Club Brugge	0–3 at Városi Stadion, 1–4 at Jan Breydel Stadium
2013–14	Videoton	1QR	2–2 (a)	(Montenegro) Mladost Podgorica	2–1 at Sóstói Stadion, 0–1 at Podgorica City Stadium
2013–14	Debrecen	2QR	2–5	(Norway) Strømsgodset	2–2 at Marienlyst Stadion, 0–3 at Városi Stadion
2013–14	Budapest Honvéd	2QR	1–5	(Serbia) Vojvodina	0–2 at Karađorđe Stadium, 1–3 at Bozsik Stadion
2014–15	Győr	2QR	1–3	(Sweden) IFK Göteborg	0–3 at ETO Park, 1–0 at Gamla Ullevi
2014–15	Ferencváros	2QR	1–3	(Croatia) Rijeka	0–1 at Stadion Kantrida, 1–2 at Ferenc Puskás Stadium
2014–15	Diósgyőr	3QR	1–8	(Russia) Krasnodar	1–5 at Nagyerdei Stadion, 0–3 at Kuban Stadium
2014–15	Debrecen^{3}	PO	1–3	(Switzerland) Young Boys	1–3 at Stade de Suisse, 0–0 at Nagyerdei Stadion
2015–16	Ferencváros	2QR	0–3	(Bosnia and Herzegovina) Željezničar	0–1 at Groupama Arena, 0–2 at Stadion Grbavica
2015–16	MTK Budapest	1QR	1–3	(Serbia) Vojvodina	0–0 at Szusza Ferenc Stadium, 1–3 at Karađorđe Stadium
2015–16	Debrecen	3QR	3–6	(Norway) Rosenborg	2–3 at Nagyerdei Stadion, 1–3 at Lerkendal Stadion
2015–16	Videoton^{4}	PO	0–4	(Poland) Lech Poznań	0–3 at City Stadium, 0–1 at Sóstói Stadion
2016–17	Videoton	3QR	1–2	(Denmark) Midtjylland	0–1 at Pancho Arena^{5}, 1–1 (a.e.t.) at MCH Arena
2016–17	Debrecen	2QR	1–3	(Belarus) Torpedo-BelAZ Zhodino	1–2 at Nagyerdei Stadion, 0–1 at Torpedo Stadium
2016–17	MTK Budapest	2QR	1–4	(Azerbaijan) Gabala	1–2 at Ménfői út^{6}, 1–2 Bakcell Arena
2017–18	Videoton	PO	0–4	(Serbia) Partizan	0–0 at Partizan Stadium, 0–4 at Pancho Aréna
2017–18	Vasas	1QR	3–7	(Israel) Beitar Jerusalem	4–3 at HaMoshava Stadium, 0–3 at Szusza Ferenc Stadion^{7}
2017–18	Ferencváros	2QR	3–7	(Denmark) Midtjylland	2–4 at Groupama Aréna, 1–3 at MCH Arena
2018–19	Ferencváros (2nd)	1QR	1−2	(Israel) Maccabi Tel Aviv	1−1 at Groupama Aréna, 0−1 at Netanya Stadium
2018–19	Budapest Honvéd (4th)	2QR	1−2	(Luxembourg) Progrès Niederkorn	1−0 at Bozsik Stadion, 0−2 at Stade Municipal
2018–19	Újpest (MK)	2QR	1−7	(Spain) Sevilla	0−4 at Ramon Sanchez Pizjuan, 1−3 at Szusza Ferenc Stadion
2018–19	MOL Vidi^{8} (Champion)	3rd in GS	N/A	(Belarus) BATE Borisov, (England) Chelsea, (Greece) PAOK	
2019–20	Fehérvár (2nd)	2QR	1−2	(Liechtenstein) Vaduz	1−0 at Pancho Aréna, 0−2 at Rheinpark Stadion
2019–20	Debrecen (3rd)	2QR	1−7	(Italy) Torino	0−3 at Stadio Giuseppe Moccagatta, 1−4 at Nagyerdei Stadion
2019–20	Budapest Honvéd (MK)	2QR	0−0 (p. 3–1)	(Romania) Universitatea Craiova	0−0 at ETO Park, 0−0 at Stadionul Ion Oblemenco
2019–20	Ferencváros^{9} (Champion)	3rd in GS	N/A	(Russia) CSKA Moscow, (Spain) Espanyol, (Bulgaria) Ludogorets Razgrad	
2020–21	Puskás Akadémia (3rd)	1QR	0-3	(Sweden) Hammarby IF	0−3 at Tele2 Arena
2020–21	Budapest Honvéd (MK)	2QR	0-2	(Sweden) Malmö FF	0-2 at Hidegkuti Nándor Stadion
2020–21	Fehérvár (2nd)	PO	1-3	(Belgium) Standard Liège	1-3 at Stade Maurice Dufrasne
2021–22	Ferencváros ^{10} (Champion)	4th in GS	N/A	(Germany) Bayer Leverkusen, (Spain) Real Betis, (Scotland) Celtic	
2022–23	Ferencváros ^{11} (Champion)	RO16	0–4	(Germany) Bayer Leverkusen	0−2 at BayArena, 0−2 at Puskás Aréna
2024–25	Paks	1QR	2–4	(Romania) Corvinul Hunedoara	0−4 at Fehérvári úti Stadion, 2−0 at Sibiu Municipal Stadium
2025–26	Paks	1QR	0-3	(Romania) CFR Cluj	0−0 at Fehérvári úti Stadion, 0−3 at Dr. Constantin Rădulescu Stadium

Notes

- Note 3: Debrecen was eliminated in the third round of the 2014-15 UEFA Champions League. Therefore, they were eligible for entering the 2014–15 UEFA Europa League play-off round.
- Note 4: Videoton was eliminated in the third round of the 2015-16 UEFA Champions League. Therefore, they were eligible for entering the 2015–16 UEFA Europa League play-off round.
- Note 5: Videoton FC played their home match at Pancho Aréna, Felcsút, due to the reconstruction of their own stadium, Sóstói Stadion.
- Note 6: MTK Budapest FC played their home match at Ménfői úti Stadion, Győr, due to the reconstruction of their own stadium, Hidegkuti Nándor Stadion.
- Note 7: Vasas SC played their home match at Szusza Ferenc Stadion due to the reconstruction of their stadium, Illovszky Rudolf Stadion.
- Note 8: Vidi were eliminated in the play-off round of the 2018-19 UEFA Champions League. Therefore, they were eligible for entering the 2018–19 UEFA Europa League group stage.
- Note 9: Ferencváros were eliminated in the third round of the 2019–20 UEFA Champions League. Therefore, they were eligible for entering the play-off stage of the 2019–20 UEFA Europa League.
- Note 10: Ferencváros were eliminated in the Play-off round of the 2021–22 UEFA Champions League. Therefore, they were eligible for entering the group stage of the 2021–22 UEFA Europa League.
- Note 11: Ferencváros were eliminated in the third round of the 2022–23 UEFA Champions League. Therefore, they were eligible for entering the play-off stage of the 2022–23 UEFA Europa League.

=== UEFA Europa Conference League ===
Year	Team	Progress	Score	Opponents	Venue(s)
2021–22	Fehérvár (3rd)	1QR	1–3	(Armenia) Ararat Yerevan	1–1 MOL Aréna Sóstó, 0–2 at Gyumri City Stadium
2021–22	Puskás Akadémia (2nd)	2QR	0–5	(Latvia) RFS	0–3 Slokas Stadium, 0–2 at Pancho Aréna
2021–22	Újpest (CW)	3QR	1–6	(Switzerland) Basel	1–2 at Szusza Ferenc Stadion, 0–4 at St. Jakob-Park
2022–23	Puskás Akadémia (3rd)	2QR	0–3	(Portugal) Vitória de Guimarães	0–3 Estádio D. Afonso Henriques, 0–0 at Pancho Aréna
2022–23	Kisvárda (2nd)	3QR	2–4	(Norway) Molde	0–3 Aker Stadion, 2–1 at Várkerti Stadion
2022–23	Fehérvár (4th)	PO	2–4	(Germany) 1. FC Köln	2–1 at RheinEnergieStadion, 0–3 at MOL Aréna Sóstó
2023–24	Ferencváros	N/A	N/A	(Italy) Fiorentina, (Belgium) Genk, (Serbia) Čukarički	
2023–24	Kecskemét (2nd)	2QR	3–4	(Latvia) Riga	2–1 at Széktói Stadion, 1–3 at Skonto Stadium
2023–24	Debrecen (3rd)	3QR	0–5	(Austria) Rapid Wien	0–0 at Weststadion, 0–5 at Nagyerdei Stadion
2023–24	Zalaegerszeg (CW)	2QR	1–3	(Croatia) Osijek	0–1 at Opus Arena, 1–2 at ZTE Arena
2024–25	Fehérvár	3QR	0–3	(Cyprus) Omonia	0–1 at GSP Stadium, 2–0 at Sóstói Stadion
2024–25	Paks	PO	2–5	(Czech Republic) Mladá Boleslav	2–2 at Lokotrans Aréna, 0–3 at Fehérvári úti Stadion
2024–25	Puskás Akadémia	PO	4–4 (4–5 p)	(Italy) Fiorentina	3–3 at Stadio Artemio Franchi, 1–1 at Pancho Aréna
2025–26	Puskás Akadémia	2QR	2–5	(Cyprus) Aris	3–2 at Alphamega Stadium, 0–2 at Pancho Aréna
2025–26	Paks	3QR	2–4	(Ukraine) Polissya	0–3 at Tsentralnyi Stadion, 2-1 at Fehérvári úti Stadion
2025–26	Győr	PO	2–3	(Austria) Rapid Wien	2-1 at ETO Park, 0–2 at Weststadion

== Records and statistics ==
European Cup/Champions League

Club	Winners	Runners-up	Semi-finalist	Quarter-finalists	Group stage^{1}
Újpest	0	0	1 (1973–74)	2 (1971–72, 1972–73)	0
Vasas Budapest	0	0	1 (1957–58)	1 (1967–68)	0
Győr	0	0	1 (1964–65)	0	0
MTK Budapest	0	0	0	1 (1955–56)	0
Ferencváros	0	0	0	1 (1965–66)	2 (1995–96, 2020-21)
Debrecen	0	0	0	0	1 (2009–10)

Notes

- Note 1: Group stage exists only in the UEFA Champions League era from 1992-93

Inter-cities Fairs Cup/UEFA Cup/Europa League

Club	Winners	Runners-up	Semi-finalist	Quarter-finalists	Group stage^{1}
Ferencváros	1 (1964–65)	1 (1967–68)	2 (1962–63, 1971–72)	0	6 (2004–05, 2019-20, 2021-22, 2022-23, 2024-25, 2025-26)
Újpest	0	1 (1968–69)	0	2 (1963–64, 1965–66)	0
Videoton	0	1 (1984–85)	0	0	2 (2012–13, 2018-19)
MTK Budapest	0	0	1 (1961–62)	0	0
Budapest Honvéd	0	0	0	1 (1978–79)	0
Debrecen	0	0	0	0	1 (2010–11)

Notes

- Note 1: Group stage existed from the UEFA Cup 2004-05 season and in the Europa League era

UEFA Cup Winners' Cup

Club	Winners	Runners-up	Semi-finalist	Quarter-finalists
MTK Budapest	0	1 (1963–64)	0	0
Ferencváros	0	1 (1974–75)	0	0
Újpest	0	0	1 (1961–62)	0
