= Nemzeti Bajnokság I =

Men's top division football league in Hungary

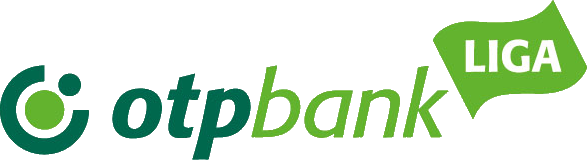
- Founded: 1901; 125 years ago
- Country: Hungary
- Confederation: UEFA
- Number of clubs: 12 (since 2015–16)
- Level on pyramid: 1
- Relegation to: Nemzeti Bajnokság II
- Domestic cup: Magyar Kupa
- International cup(s): UEFA Champions League; UEFA Europa League; UEFA Conference League
- Current champions: ETO FC (5th title) (2025–26)
- Most championships: Ferencváros (36 titles)
- Most appearances: Zoltán Végh (570)
- Top scorer: Ferenc Szusza (393)
- Broadcaster: M4 Sport
- Website: www.mlsz.hu
- Current: 2026–27 Nemzeti Bajnokság I

The Nemzeti Bajnokság (Hungarian pronunciation: [ˈnɛmzɛti ˈbɒjnokʃaːɡ], lit. 'national championship'), also known as NB I or OTP Bank Liga after its title sponsor, OTP Bank, is a professional association football league in Hungary and the highest level of the Hungarian football league system.

Twelve teams compete in the league, playing each other three times, once at home, once away, and the third match is played at the stadium that the last match was not played at. At the end of the season, the top team enters the qualification rounds for the UEFA Champions League, while the runner-up and the third place, enter the UEFA Conference League qualification rounds. and the winner of the Magyar Kupa enter the UEFA Europa League qualification rounds. The last-placed club is relegated to Nemzeti Bajnokság II, the second-level league, to be replaced by the winner of the NB II. The second-to-last team in the first division plays a relegation play-off against the second-placed team in NB II at a neutral venue.

== History ==
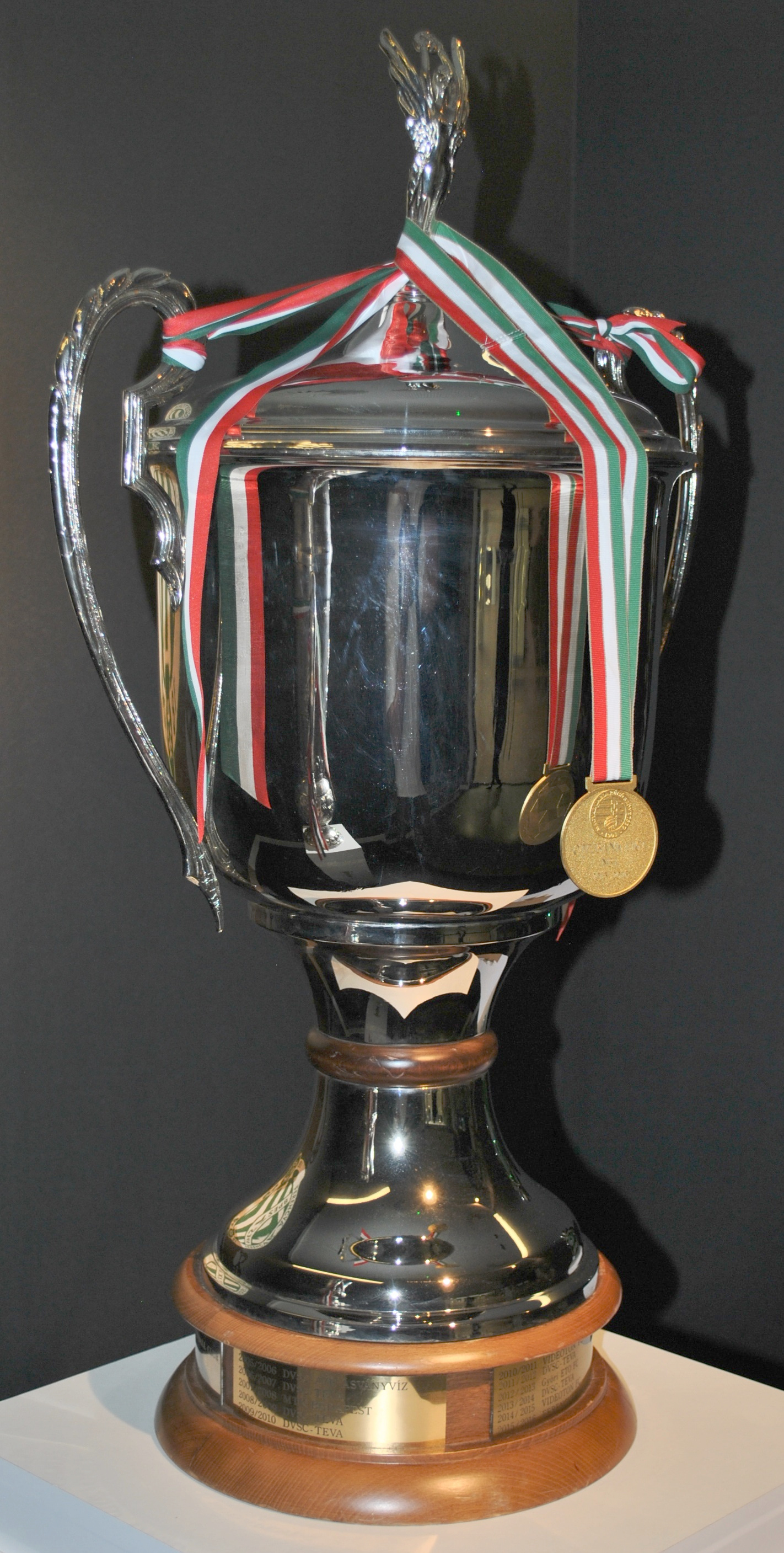
The trophy of the Nemzeti Bajnokság

=== 1901-1930 ===
The first championship in 1901 was contested by BTC, MUE, FTC, Műegyetemi AFC, and Budapesti SC, with the latter winning the championship. Although the two first championships were won by Budapesti TC, the other titles that decade were won by FTC and MTK, with the latter doing so undefeated in 1906 and 1908.

In the 1910s and 1920s, the championship was dominated by Ferencváros and MTK. The green and whites won 7 league titles between 1905 and 1913, while MTK won 9 consecutive national championships, a recording standing to this day.

In 1929 MTK claimed their 13th league title, expanding the gap between their trophy cabinet and that of Ferencváros. With 13 championships at the time, MTK were the record champions.

=== 1930-1950 ===
In the 1930s, the rivalry between Ferencváros and MTK Budapest expanded with another club, Újpest FC (at that time not part of Budapest). Újpest became the first club to break the duopoly of Ferencváros and MTK in the league in 26 years, as they won the 1930 Hungarian 1st Division, for the first time in the club's history. Újpest would defend their title the following season, eventually closing out the decade with 5 titles.

In 1932 Ferencváros won the league with a 100% win rate, winning all 20 of their games.

One of the most iconic figures of the 1930s Hungarian football was Újpest's Zsengellér who managed to top goalscorer three times in a row in the 1930s. Ferencváros's Sárosi and MTK Budapest's Cseh and Újpest's Zsengellér were the embodiment of the rivalry of the three clubs from Budapest, named Budapest derby.

In 1941 Ferencváros won their 16th national championship, to overtake MTK as the record champions.

In the 1940s, Csepel could win its first title which was followed by two other titles in 1942 and 1943. During World War II, there were no interruptions in the Hungarian league. Due to the expansion of the territories of the country, new clubs, from the new cities Hungary had, could re-join the league such as Nagyvárad and Kolozsvár, which are both nowadays in Romania. The second half of the 1940s was dominated by Újpest by winning the championship in 1945, 1946, and 1947. The 1940s also saw Nagyvárad winning the league, marking the only time the Hungarian league was won by a team that nowadays is not from a city located in Hungary (Nagyvárad, also known as Oradea, is nowadays located in Romania.).

=== 1950-1980 ===
In the 1950s, the dominance of Ferencváros and MTK were weakened by the emergence of Honvéd with players such as Puskás, Bozsik, Czibor, and Budai. Later these players played in the final of the 1954 FIFA World Cup. In the 1950s, Honvéd managed to win the championship five times. During the early 1950s, Honvéd players formed the backbone of the legendary Mighty Magyars. In 1956, the Hungarian league was suspended due to the Hungarian Revolution. The league was led by Honvéd after 21 rounds but the championship was never finished. In 1957 Vasas won their first ever national title.

In the first season (1955–56) of the European Cup, MTK Budapest reached the quarter-finals while in the 1957–58 season Vasas Budapest played in the semi-finals of the European Cup.

Vasas won four titles in the 1960s (1960–61, 1961–62, 1965, and 1966).

In 1963 Győr became the first non-Budapest club of the post-war era to win the national championship. The western Hungarian side were champions due to their superior goal difference, as they finished equal on points with both Ferencváros and Honvéd.

During the 1966 season Vasas laid claim to the championship undefeated, becoming the first team since FTC 34 years prior to do so. In 1967 Ferencváros became the first club to win 20 national championships, as the 9th districtian side finished 8 points above arch-rivals Újpest.

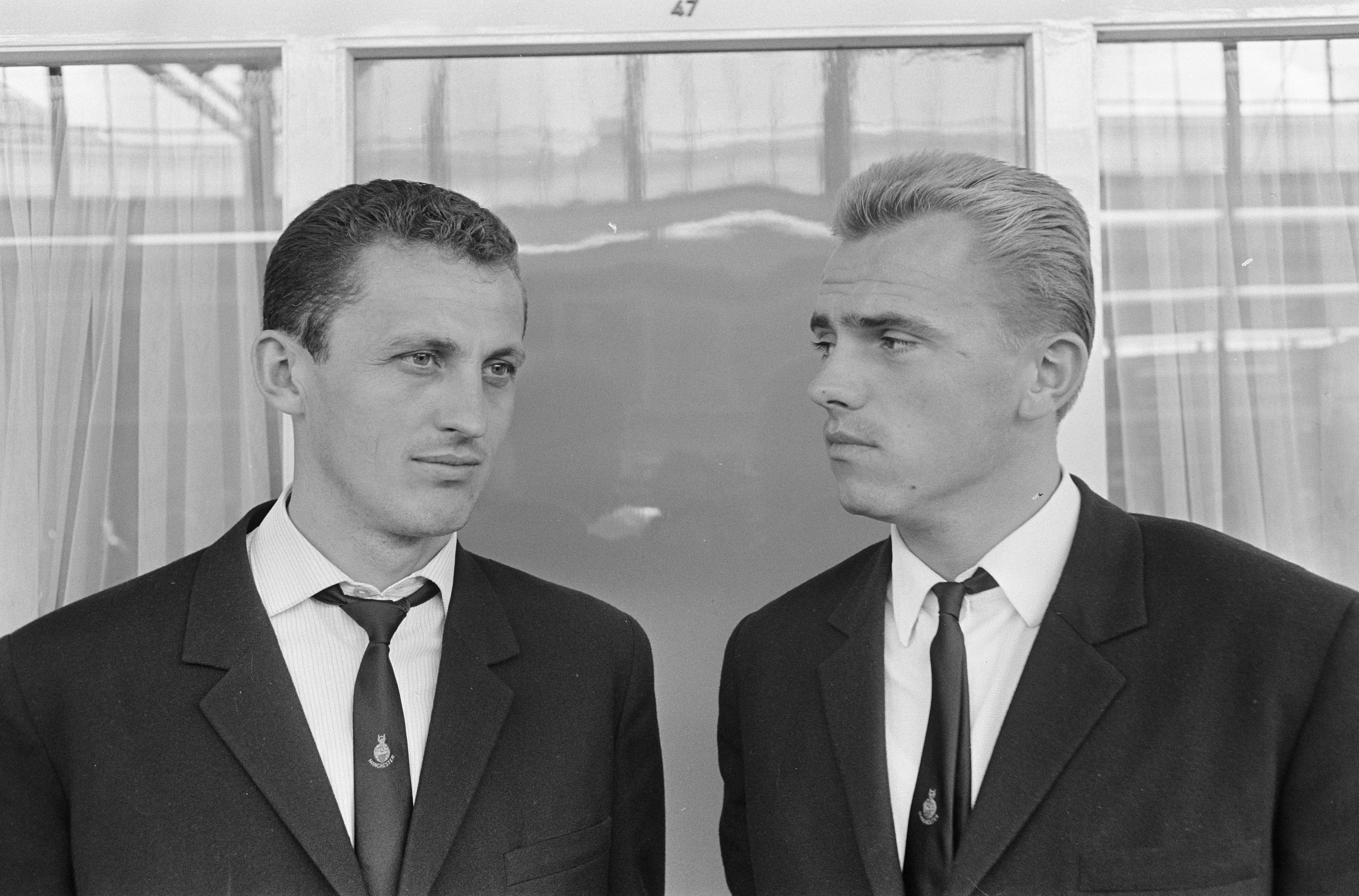
Ferencváros legend Albert with Vasas legend Mészöly in the 1960s

Újpest dominated the 1970s under former legendary headcoach of the national team, Lajos Baróti, winning seven consecutive titles, between 1969 and 1975. Under the guidance of Péter Várhidi, Újpest won the 1978 season, and successfully defended their championship in 1979, closing out the decade with 9 leaguetitles overall.

=== 1980-2000 ===
In 1982, Győr won the championship becoming the first non-Budapest team who could win the Hungarian league numerous times. Győr managed to add another title to their tally, as they went on to repeat the triumph in the following year in 1983. However, the 1980s was dominated by Honvéd who celebrated its second heyday during the 1980s. In 1980 Honvéd ended their 25-year wait for a leaguetitle under headcoach, and former player legend, Lajos Tichy. Between 1984 and 1986, the side from the 19th district completed a three-peat under coach István Komora, also winning the 1988 and 1989 editions of the tournament under Bertalan Bicskei and József Both, respectively. In 1987 MTK won their first league-title in 29 years, the longest championship-drought in the club's history.

Due to the collapse of communism, Hungarian football clubs lost the support of the state. Therefore, many clubs were faced with financial problems the effects of which are still present in Hungarian football. However, the 1990s were still dominated by the 'traditional' clubs of the championships such as Ferencváros, MTK and Újpest. Ferencváros finished in the top three for every season of the decade, except for the 1993–94 season, when they finished 4th. The green and whites added 3 championships to their tally throughout the '90's decade.

In 1994 Vác FC won their first and only leaguetitle in club history, finishing 3 points clear off of Honvéd under coach János Csank.

MTK suffered their first ever relegation in 1994, after finishing 16th during the 1993/94 season, however, the white and blues quickly bounced back, and won their 20th national championship in 1997, and their 21st in 1999. During both seasons, MTK achieved the first and second highest ever point tallies (87 and 85, respectively) in the history of the Hungarian League.

Újpest started off the 1990s decade by winning the league under headcoach Péter Várhidi, after a dramatic titlerace against MTK, which saw both clubs finish on equal points on the last day of the season. The club from the North of Pest saw little success in the ensuing 4 years, finishing as low as 14th in 1993, narrowly avoiding relegation. Off of the back of a bronze-medal, and two runner-up finishes, in 1998 Újpest won their 20th national championship, defeating Budapest Honvéd 2–0 on the last day of the season.

The financial problems affected the performance of the clubs outside the Hungarian League as well. Hungarian clubs could not compete with their European counterparts. Moreover, the Bosman ruling also had a deep impact on the Hungarian League. Since big European clubs could invest loads of money into football, clubs from the Eastern Bloc were restricted to employing only home nationals.

=== 2000- ===
In the 2000s, new clubs became champions, mainly from rural Hungary. In 2002, Bozsik's Zalaegerszeg won the championship for the first time in the club's history.

Debreceni VSC, a team that spent over 5 decades in the 2nd division and had never won a national championship prior to the 21st century, remarkably won the Hungarian league in 2005, 2006, 2007, 2009, and 2010, becoming the first non-Budapest dynasty in the history of the league. In 2009 they also qualified for the Champions League.

In 2008 MTK managed to win their 23rd league title with head coach József Garami.

The dominance of the rural clubs continued in the 2010s. In 2011 and 2015, Székesfehérvár's Videoton won the championship for the first time in the club's history. In 2012 Debreceni VSC won the league under Elemér Kondás undefeated, while spending every single gameweek atop the table. In 2013, Győr won their fourth championship overall, and their first one since 1983, under Attila Pintér.

In 2014, Debreceni VSC won their seventh Hungarian League title.

In 2016 Ferencváros claimed their first league trophy in 12 years, winning the league with 6 games left.

In 2017 it was another team from the capital, Budapest Honvéd, who ended an over decade-long title-drought, as they snatched the trophy on the last day of the season from Videoton, defeating the Fejér-county side 1–0.

The following year Videoton won their third league title, ironically confirming their championship after beating defending champions Honvéd 2–0 on 27 May 2018.

In 2019, Ferencváros won their 30th national title, finishing 13 points ahead of MOL Vidi FC. The green and whites have won every single league title ever since, being champions throughout six successive seasons, a club record, with their 36th national title in 2025, where they finished 3 points ahead of Puskás Akadémia. In 2026, after 7 years of Ferencváros winning, ETO FC won the 5th national title.

After 14 years, the OTP Bank Liga changed its name to Fizz Liga in 2025. Fizz was the title sponsor for only 1 year.

From the 2026–27 season, the championship will once again be called the OTP Bank Liga.

== Sponsorship ==
Period	Sponsor	Brand
1926–1935	No sponsor	PLASZ I. osztály
1935–1997	No sponsor	NB I
1992–1999	Raab–Karcher	Raab–Karcher NB1
1999–2001	No sponsor	PNB
2001–2003	Borsodi	Borsodi Liga
2003–2005	Arany Ászok	Arany Ászok Liga
2005–2007	Borsodi	Borsodi Liga
2007–2010	Soproni	Soproni Liga
2010–2011	Monicomp	Monicomp Liga
2011–2025	OTP Bank	OTP Bank Liga
2025–2026	Fizz	Fizz Liga
2026–present	OTP Bank	OTP Bank Liga

The main sponsors of the championship are MLSZ, OTP Bank, Szerencsejáték Zrt.

== Finances ==
=== Financial regulations ===
The MLSZ Hungarian and youth recommendation operates not as a traditional subsidy, but as a performance-based financial incentive system. The funds distributed through this mechanism are derived primarily from central revenues, including domestic television broadcasting rights (traditionally held by MTVA) and central marketing partnerships.

The financial framework is managed through a dedicated fund, often referred to as the "Productivity and Solidarity Fund" (Produktivitási és Szolidaritási Alap). The distribution of these funds is strictly regulated based on a point system and compliance tiers:

- The 500 Million HUF Threshold: Starting from the 2025–26 financial cycle, the maximum available incentive was raised to 500 million HUF (approx. €1.3 million) per club per season.
- The Payout Criteria: To unlock the full sum, clubs must maintain 100% compliance with both the domestic player ratio and the U21 minutes throughout the 33-round championship.
- Partial Compliance and Base Payouts: If a club fails to meet the strict "4+1" continuous on-pitch criteria but achieves a secondary threshold (averaging a specific number of domestic minutes per match), they are relegated to a lower funding tier, receiving a base amount of 325 million HUF.

=== Financial Penalties and Forfeiture ===
Because the system is legally classified as a "recommendation," there are no direct financial fines or audits levied against non-compliant clubs. Instead, the mechanism relies on voluntary forfeiture:

Note on Revenue Allocation: If a club decides not to comply with the guidelines, the multi-million HUF sum they would have been entitled to is withheld by the MLSZ. These forfeited funds are typically redistributed by the federation into youth academy development funds, grassroots football, or divided among the clubs that fully achieved their domestic minutes quotas.

== Media coverage ==
The matches will be broadcast free of charge on television on M4 Sport, M4 Sport+ (Duna World) and on the internet at m4sport.hu/

== Current clubs ==
As of the 2026–27 season, there are twelve clubs in the division, who play each other three times for a total of 33 games each. The 12th place team is automatically eliminated, but the 11th place team plays a play-off with the 2nd place team from Nemzeti Bajnokság II.

Location of teams in 2026–27 Nemzeti Bajnokság I
Location of Budapest teams

Team	Location	Stadium	Cap.	2025–26	2026–27
Debrecen	Debrecen	Nagyerdei Stadion	20,340	4th	details
ETO	Győr	ETO Park	15,600	1st	details
Ferencváros	Budapest (Ferencváros)	Groupama Aréna	22,043	2nd	details
Kispest Honvéd	Budapest (Kispest)	Bozsik Aréna	8,370	2nd (NB II)	
Kisvárda	Kisvárda	Várkerti Stadion	2,750	8th	
Nyíregyháza	Nyíregyháza	Városi Stadion	8,150	9th	
MTK	Budapest (Józsefváros)	Hidegkuti Nándor Stadion	5,014	10th	
Puskás Akadémia	Felcsút	Pancho Aréna	3,816	6th	
Paks	Paks	Fehérvári úti Stadion	6,150	3rd	details
Újpest	Budapest (Újpest)	Szusza Ferenc Stadion	12,670	7th	
Vasas	Budapest (Angyalföld)	Illovszky Rudolf Stadion	5,054	1st (NB II)	
Zalaegerszeg	Zalaegerszeg	ZTE Aréna	11,200	5th	

== Rivalries and Derbies ==
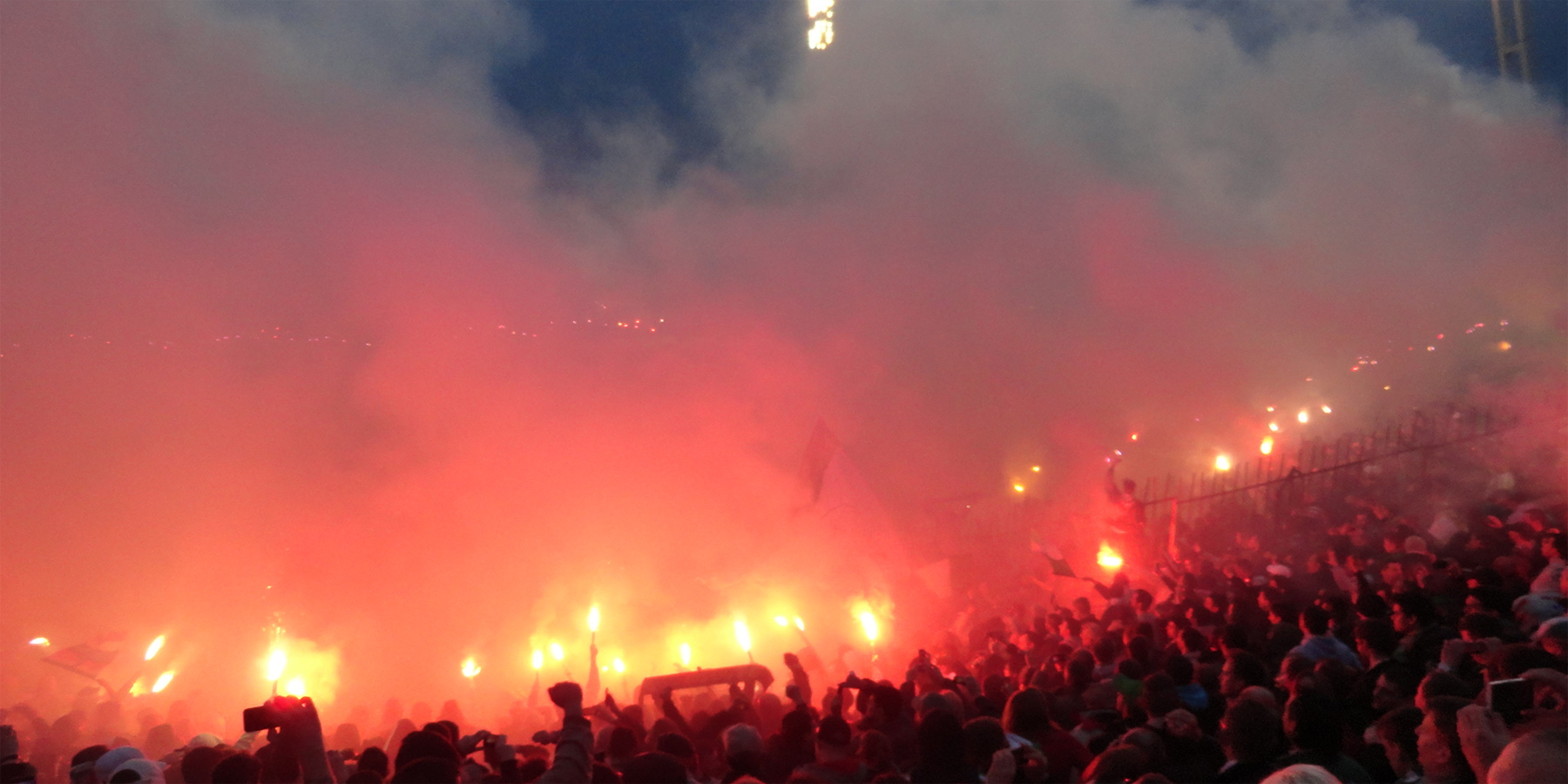
Ferencváros-Újpest derby in the Hungarian league at the Albert Stadion on 10 March 2013

The biggest rivalry is between Ferencváros and Újpest (The Derby). Matches between Ferencváros and Újpest are famous for their intense fan culture, featuring large-scale choreography (tifo), pyrotechnincs, and a heavy police presence to prevent clashes between the ultras.

The oldest rivalry in Hungary is between Ferencváros and MTK (Eternal Derby).

Debreceni VSC and Diósgyőri VTK are the most successful teams in eastern Hungary. Sharing red-and-white colors. Both clubs historically dominated their regions: Debrecen won its regional championship 6 times between 1918 and 1926, while Diósgyőr secured 16 regional and second-division titles between 1912 and 1937.

For more rivalries, see this article Budapest derby.

== Champions ==
- 1901: BTC
- 1902: BTC (2)
- 1903: Ferencváros
- 1904: MTK
- 1905: Ferencváros (2)
- 1906–07: Ferencváros (3)
- 1907–08: MTK (2)
- 1908–09: Ferencváros (4)
- 1909–10: Ferencváros (5)
- 1910–11: Ferencváros (6)
- 1911–12: Ferencváros (7)
- 1912–13: Ferencváros (8)
- 1913–14: MTK (3)
- 1914–16 – Unofficial championships
- 1916–17: MTK (4)
- 1917–18: MTK (5)
- 1918–19: MTK (6)
- 1919–20: MTK (7)
- 1920–21: MTK (8)
- 1921–22: MTK (9)
- 1922–23: MTK (10)
- 1923–24: MTK (11)
- 1924–25: MTK (12)
- 1925–26: Ferencváros (9)
- 1926–27: Ferencváros (10)
- 1927–28: Ferencváros (11)
- 1928–29: MTK (as Hungária) (13)
- 1929–30: Újpest
- 1930–31: Újpest (2)
- 1931–32: Ferencváros (12)
- 1932–33: Újpest (3)
- 1933–34: Ferencváros (13)
- 1934–35: Újpest (4)
- 1935–36: MTK (as Hungária) (14)
- 1936–37: MTK (as Hungária) (15)
- 1937–38: Ferencváros (14)
- 1938–39: Újpest (5)
- 1939–40: Ferencváros (15)
- 1940–41: Ferencváros (16)
- 1941–42: Csepel
- 1942–43: Csepel (2)
- 1943–44: Nagyvárad
- 1944 – unofficial championship
- 1945: Újpest (6)
- 1945–46: Újpest (7)
- 1946–47: Újpest (8)
- 1947–48: Csepel (3)
- 1948–49: Ferencváros (17)
- 1949–50: Honvéd
- 1950: Honvéd (2)
- 1951: MTK (as Bástya) (16)
- 1952: Honvéd (3)
- 1953: MTK (as Vörös Lobogó) (17)
- 1954: Honvéd (4)
- 1955: Honvéd (5)
- 1956 – abandoned due to Revolution The championship would have gone to Honvéd
- 1957: Vasas
- 1957–58: MTK (18)
- 1958–59: Csepel (4)
- 1959–60: Újpest (as Dózsa) (9)
- 1960–61: Vasas (2)
- 1961–62: Vasas (3)
- 1962–63: Ferencváros (18)
- 1963: Győr (as Győri Vasas ETO)
- 1964: Ferencváros (19)
- 1965: Vasas (4)
- 1966: Vasas (5)
- 1967: Ferencváros (20)
- 1968: Ferencváros (21)
- 1969: Újpest (as Dózsa) (10)
- 1970: Újpest (as Dózsa) (11)
- 1970–71: Újpest (as Dózsa) (12)
- 1971–72: Újpest (as Dózsa) (13)
- 1972–73: Újpest (as Dózsa) (14)
- 1973–74: Újpest (as Dózsa) (15)
- 1974–75: Újpest (as Dózsa) (16)
- 1975–76: Ferencváros (22)
- 1976–77: Vasas (6)
- 1977–78: Újpest (as Dózsa) (17)
- 1978–79: Újpest (as Dózsa) (18)
- 1979–80: Honvéd (6)
- 1980–81: Ferencváros (23)
- 1981–82: Győr (as ETO Győr) (2)
- 1982–83: Győr (as ETO Győr) (3)
- 1983–84: Honvéd (7)
- 1984–85: Honvéd (8)
- 1985–86: Honvéd (9)
- 1986–87: MTK (as MTK-VM) (19)
- 1987–88: Honvéd (10)
- 1988–89: Honvéd (11)
- 1989–90: Újpest (as Dózsa) (19)
- 1990–91: Honvéd (12)
- 1991–92: Ferencváros (24)
- 1992–93: Honvéd (as Kispest) (13)
- 1993–94: Vác
- 1994–95: Ferencváros (25)
- 1995–96: Ferencváros (26)
- 1996–97: MTK (20)
- 1997–98: Újpest (20)
- 1998–99: MTK (21)
- 1999–2000: Dunaújváros (as Dunaferr)
- 2000–01: Ferencváros (27)
- 2001–02: Zalaegerszeg
- 2002–03: MTK (as MTK-Hungária) (22)
- 2003–04: Ferencváros (28)
- 2004–05: Debrecen
- 2005–06: Debrecen (2)
- 2006–07: Debrecen (3)
- 2007–08: MTK (23)
- 2008–09: Debrecen (4)
- 2009–10: Debrecen (5)
- 2010–11: Fehérvár (as Videoton)
- 2011–12: Debrecen (6)
- 2012–13: Győr (4)
- 2013–14: Debrecen (7)
- 2014–15: Fehérvár (as Videoton) (2)
- 2015–16: Ferencváros (29)
- 2016–17: Honvéd (14)
- 2017–18: Fehérvár (as Videoton) (3)
- 2018–19: Ferencváros (30)
- 2019–20: Ferencváros (31)
- 2020–21: Ferencváros (32)
- 2021–22: Ferencváros (33)
- 2022–23: Ferencváros (34)
- 2023–24: Ferencváros (35)
- 2024–25: Ferencváros (36)
- 2025–26: Győr (as ETO Győr) (5)

=== Notes ===
- 1901–26: Amateur era
- 1901–08: Teams only from Budapest took part
- 1914–15: Cancelled due to war but from 1916 to 1918–19 war championships operated and are recognized by the FA.
- 1926: The professional league was introduced with 10 participants also from other cities than Budapest, like Szombathely, Szeged etc.
- 1935: The first national championship was held. (Nemzeti Bajnokság, NB) 14 teams.
- 1940: Hungária (MTK) was banned by the fascist government. During the war, teams from the neighboring countries participated, since the territories were adjoined to Hungary, which is how Nagyvarad became champions that year.
- 1944: It was abandoned due to war.
- 1945: New Nemzeti Bajnokság I starts.
- 1956–57: Abandoned due to revolution.

=== Name changes ===
- Honvéd: 1909 Kispesti Athlétikai Club, 1926 Kispest FC, 1944 Kispesti AC, 1949 Honvéd Sport Egyesület, 1950 Budapesti Honvéd Sport Egyesület, 1991 Kispest-Honvéd FC, 2003 Budapest Honvéd Futball Club
- Csepel: 1912 Csepeli Testedzők Köre, 1932 Csepel FC, 1937 Weiss Manfréd FC, 1945 Csepeli Munkás Testedző Kör, 1946 Csepeli Vasas Testedző Kör, 1957, Csepel SC, 1993 Csepel-Kordax, 1995 Csepel Sport Club, 1999 Csepel Sport Club Alapítvány, 2000 Csepel-Auto Trader, 2001 Merland-Csepel-AT, 2006 Láng SK-Csepel FC SE, 2007 Csepel Football Club, 2011 Indotek Csepel Football Club, 2013 Sportbusz Csepel Football Club, 2014 Csepel Football Club, 2022 Csepel-Csep-Gól FC, 2024 Csepel Sport Club)
- Ferencváros: (1899 FTC, 1926 Ferenczváros, 1926 Ferencváros Football Club, 1944 Ferencvárosi Torna Club, 1949 EDOSZ, 1951 Bp. Kinizsi, 1955 Ferencvárosi Torna Club)
- MTK: 1883 Magyar Testgyakorlók Köre, 1926 Hungária Football Club, 1945 MTK, 1950 Budapesti Textiles Sportegyesület, 1951 Budapesti Bástya SK, 1953 Budapesti Vörös Lobogó, 1957 MTK, 1975 MTK-VM Sportklub, 1992 MTK, 1998 MTK Hungária FC, 2013 MTK Budapest)
- Újpest: 1885 Újpesti Torna Egylet, 1926 Újpest FC, 1944 Újpesti Torna Egyesület, 1950 Dózsa Sport Egyesület, 1951 Budapesti Dózsa SK, 1956 Újpesti TE, 1957 Újpesti Dózsa Sport Club, 1991 Újpesti TE, 1994 Újpesti TE-Novabau, 1995 Újpesti Torna Egylet, 1998 Újpest Football Club)
- Fehérvár: 1941 Vadásztölténygyári SK, 1944 Székesfehérvári Vadásztölténygyár, 1948 Fehérvári Dolgozók SE II., 1949 Székesfehérvári Vasas SK, 1949 Székesfehérvári Vasas Vadásztöltény-gyár, 1962 Székesfehérvári VT Vasas, 1968 Videoton Sport Club, 1990 Videoton-Waltham SC, 1992 Videoton-Waltham Futball Club, 1993 Parmalat Futball Club, 1996 Fehérvár '96 FC, 2004 FC Fehérvár, 2018 MOL Vidi FC, 2019 MOL Fehérvár FC, 2023 Fehérvár FC
- Győr: 1904 Győri ETO, 1945 Győri Vasas ETO, 1957 Magyar Vagon és Gépgyár ETO, 1958 Győri Vasas ETO, 1968 Rába Vasas ETO, 1990 Győri Rába ETO SC, 1994 ETO Futballklub Győr, 1995 Győri Egyetértés Torna Osztály Futball Club, 2015 ETO FC Győr, 2017 WKW ETO FC Győr, 2022 ETO FC Győr, 2025 ETO FC

== Format changes ==
- 1901–1903: 5 teams
- 1903–1904: 8 teams
- 1904–1910: 9 teams
- 1910–1914: 10 teams
- 1914: 2 groups of 14 teams
- 1915: 14 teams
- 1916–1919: 12 teams
- 1919–1921: 15 teams
- 1921–1926: 12 teams
- 1926–27: 10 teams
- 1927–1935: 12 teams
- 1935–1941: 14 teams
- 1941–1944: 16 teams
- 1944–45: 12 teams
- 1945–46: 4 groups of 14 teams
- 1946–1947: 16 teams
- 1947–1948: 17 teams
- 1948–1951: 16 teams
- 1951–1955: 14 teams
- 1956–1957: 12 teams
- 1957–1966: 14 teams
- 1967–1976: 16 teams
- 1976–1982: 18 teams
- 1982–1996: 16 teams
- 1996–2000: 18 teams
- 2000–2004: 12 teams
- 2004–2015: 16 teams
- 2015–: 12 teams

== Most titles ==
Below is a ranking of the clubs by most titles won.

Club	Titles	Winning seasons
Ferencváros	36	1903, 1905, 1906–07, 1908–09, 1909–10, 1910–11, 1911–12, 1912–13, 1925–26, 1926–27, 1927–28, 1931–32, 1933–34, 1937–38, 1939–40, 1940–41, 1948–49, 1962–63, 1964, 1967, 1968, 1975–76, 1980–81, 1991–92, 1994–95, 1995–96, 2000–01, 2003–04, 2015–16, 2018–19, 2019–20, 2020–21, 2021–22, 2022–23, 2023–24, 2024–25
MTK	23	1904, 1907–08, 1913–14, 1916–17, 1917–18, 1918–19, 1919–20, 1920–21, 1921–22, 1922–23, 1923–24, 1924–25, 1928–29, 1935–36, 1936–37, 1951, 1953, 1957–58, 1986–87, 1996–97, 1998–99, 2002–03, 2007–08
Újpest	20	1929–30, 1930–31, 1932–33, 1934–35, 1938–39, 1945, 1945–46, 1946–47, 1959–60, 1969, 1970, 1970–71, 1971–72, 1972–73, 1973–74, 1974–75, 1977–78, 1978–79, 1989–90, 1997–98
Honvéd ±	14	1949–50 (I), 1950 (II), 1952, 1954, 1955, 1979–80, 1983–84, 1984–85, 1985–86, 1987–88, 1988–89, 1990–91, 1992–93, 2016–17
Debrecen	7	2004–05, 2005–06, 2006–07, 2008–09, 2009–10, 2011–12, 2013–14
Vasas	6	1957, 1960–61, 1961–62, 1965, 1966, 1976–77
Győr *	5	1963, 1981–82, 1982–83, 2012–13, 2025–26
Csepel	4	1941–42, 1942–43, 1947–48, 1958–59
Fehérvár	3	2010–11, 2014–15, 2017–18
BTC †	2	1901, 1902
Vác	1	1993–94
Nagyvárad ‡	1	1943–44
Dunaferr	1	1999–2000
Zalaegerszeg	1	2001–02

Notes:

- † Dissolved before World War II
- ‡ Team from Oradea, which is now located in Romania
- * Includes Rába Vasas ETO Győr, Győri Vasas ETO, ETO FC
- ± The trophy of the 1956 championship would have gone to Honvéd, but the results of the championship were canceled due to the revolution.

== Most seasons ==
The following clubs have spent 50 or more seasons in the Nemzeti Bajnokság I. Clubs in bold compete in the 2026–27 season.

Seasons	Team
122	**Ferencváros**
119	**Újpest**
113	**MTK**
111	**Honvéd**
90	**Vasas**
72	**Győr**
63	Szombathely
56	Fehérvár
54	Diósgyőr
52	**Debrecen**
51	Csepel, Pécs

For a complete list see: Number of seasons

== Top scorers ==
=== All time top scorers ===
As of July 2021.

#	Name	Period	Clubs	Goals	Matches	Average
1.	Ferenc Szusza	1940–1961	Újpest	393	462	0.85
2.	Gyula Zsengellér	1935–1947	Salgótarjáni BTC, Újpest	387	325	1.22
3.	Imre Schlosser	1906–1928	FTC/MTK	368	284	1.36
4.	József Takács	1920–1940	Vasas, Ferencváros, Erzsébet, Szürketaxi	360	355	1.01
5.	Ferenc Puskás	1943–1956	Honvéd	360	352	1.02
6.	György Sárosi	1931–1948	Ferencváros	351	383	0.92
7.	Gyula Szilágyi	1943–1960	Debrecen, Vasas	313	390	0.80
8.	Ferenc Deák	1944–1954	Szentlőrinc, Ferencváros, Újpest	303	244	1.24
9.	Ferenc Bene	1960–1978	Újpest	303	418	0.72
10.	Géza Toldi	1928–1946	Ferencváros, Gamma-Budafok, Szegedi AK, MADISZ	271	324	0.84
11	Nándor Hidegkuti	1942–1958	MTK	265	381	0.70
12.	Flórián Albert	1959–1974	Ferencváros	256	351	0.73
13.	Sandor Kocsis	1945–1956	Kőbányai TC, Ferencváros, Honvéd	251	253	0.99
14.	László Fazekas	1965–1980	Újpest	251	408	0.62

== Players ==
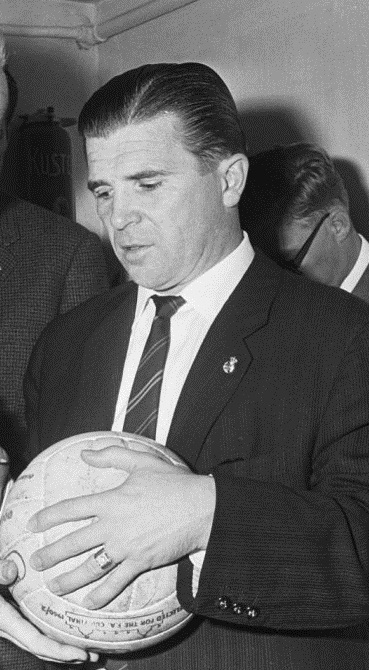
Ferenc Puskás scored 360 goals in 352 matches for Honvéd

One of the most notable players of the Hungarian League was Ferenc Puskás who played for Honvéd. He played for Honvéd from 1943 to 1955 and then for Real Madrid. He made his first senior appearance for Kispest in November 1943 in a match against Nagyváradi AC.

== Statistics ==
=== UEFA coefficients ===
The following data indicates Hungarian coefficient rankings between European football leagues.

Country ranking
As of 4 August 2026.

- 15. (15) (Cyprus) Cypriot First Division (32.818)
- 16. (16) (Switzerland) Swiss Super League (28.200)
- 17. (22) (Hungary) **Nemzeti Bajnokság I** (26.312)
- 18. (19) (Sweden) Allsvenskan (25.500)
- 19. (18) (Scotland) Scottish Premiership (24.750)

Club ranking
As of 4 August 2026.

- 37. Ferencváros (48.250)
- 255. Paks (6.000)
- 264. Puskás Akadémia (5.500)
- 271. ETO FC (5.262)
- 272. Fehérvár (5.262)
- 273. Debrecen (5.262)
- 274. Zalaegerszeg (5.262)
- 275. Kecskemét (5.262)
- 276. Kisvárda (5.262)
- 277. Újpest (5.262)
- 297. Honvéd (4.800)

=== Attendance ===
Attendances reached peaks in 1955 and 1957.

The record for highest average home attendance for a club was set by Budapest Kinizsi in 1955 (49,077 over 13 home matches). 27 March 1955 saw the record for highest attendance at a match, with 100,500 in the game between Honvéd and Budapest Kinizsi at Ferenc Puskás Stadium. The highest ever average attendance for NB I as a whole was set in 1955 with 17,151.

Year	Average	Change
1957	17,083	/
1957–58	14,668	−14.1%
1958–59	14,659	−0.1%
1959–60	16,712	+14.0%
1960–61	15,198	−9.1%
1961–62	12,951	−14.8%
1962–63	14,184	+9.5%
1963	13,649	−3.8%
1964	16,151	+18.1%
1965	14,521	−10.1%
1966	11,951	−17.7%
1967	11,368	−4.9%
1968	9,392	−17.4%
1969	8,343	−11.2%
1970	8,668	+3.9%

Year	Average	Change
1970–71	7,067	−18.5%
1971–72	6,135	−13.2%
1972–73	7,208	+17.5%
1973–74	8,163	+13.2%
1974–75	8,717	+6.8%
1975–76	10,108	+16.0%
1976–77	8,834	−12.6%
1977–78	8,026	−9.1%
1978–79	6,606	−17.7%
1979–80	7,588	+14.9%
1980–81	6,835	−9.9%
1981–82	7,039	+3.0%
1982–83	9,576	+36.0%
1983–84	7,896	−17.5%
1984–85	7,812	−1.1%

Year	Average	Change
1985–86	7,581	−3.0%
1986–87	7,683	+1.3%
1987–88	7,977	+3.8%
1988–89	6,925	−13.2%
1989–90	5,888	−15.0%
1990–91	5,307	−9.9%
1991–92	5,586	+5.2%
1992–93	5,398	−3.4%
1993–94	5,355	−0.8%
1994–95	5,842	+9.1%
1995–96	4,965	−15.0%
1996–97	4,443	−10.5%
1997–98	5,786	+30.2%
1998–99	5,009	−13.4%
1999–00	3,686	−26.4%

Year	Average	Change
2000–01	4,420	+12.0%
2001–02	3,961	−10.4%
2002–03	3,396	−14.3%
2003–04	3,406	+0.3%
2004–05	3,291	−3.4%
2005–06	3,136	−4.7%
2006–07	2,755	−12.1%
2007–08	2,975	+8.0%
2008–09	2,953	−0.7%
2009–10	3,115	+5.5%
2010–11	2,812	−9.7%
2011–12	3,858	+37.2%
2012–13	2,844	−26.3%
2013–14	2,993	+5.2%
2014–15	2,505	−16.3%

Year	Average	Change
2015–16	2,602	+3.9%
2016–17	2,705	+4.0%
2017–18	2,907	+7.5%
2018–19	3,300	+16.0%
2019–20	3,467 *	+5.1%
2020–21	COVID-19	-
2021–22	2,781	-
2022–23	3,539	+27.3%
2023–24	4,181	+18.1%
2024–25	4,553	+8.9%
2025–26	4,301	−5.5%

- In the 2019–20 season 198 games were played, but only 160 were played without COVID-19 limitations.

554,741 tickets were sold for 160 games without crowd limitations – season's average 3,467 per game. 599,676 tickets were sold for all 198 games – season's average 3,029 per game, not including 8 games behind close doors, 190 games – season's average 3,156 per game.

== See also ==
- Football in Hungary
- List of international football players playing in Hungary
- List of Nemzeti Bajnokság I clubs
- List of Nemzeti Bajnokság I managers
- List of Nemzeti Bajnokság I stadiums
- Hungarian football clubs in European competitions
- Nemzeti Bajnokság II
- Nemzeti Bajnokság III
