= 1945 Nemzeti Bajnokság I =

Nemzeti Bajnokság I
- Season: 1945
- Champions: Újpest FC

Final standings of the Hungarian League 1945 Spring season. With an average attendance of 9,636, Ferencváros recorded the highest average home league attendance.

== Final standings ==
Pos	Team	Pld	W	D	L	GF	GA	GR	Pts	Qualification or relegation
1	Újpesti TE	22	18	1	3	125	27	4.630	37	Champions
2	FTC	22	16	2	4	87	18	4.833	34	
3	Csepel	22	15	2	5	91	41	2.220	32	
4	Kispest	22	14	2	6	74	55	1.345	30	
5	Vasas SC	22	10	7	5	69	38	1.816	27	
6	MTK	22	11	3	8	53	51	1.039	25	
7	Erzsébeti MTK	22	10	1	11	54	48	1.125	21	
8	Budai Barátság	22	9	2	11	47	58	0.810	20	
9	Zuglói MADISZ	22	7	4	11	55	64	0.859	18	
10	Budapesti MÁVAG SK	22	4	1	17	29	82	0.354	9	Relegated to NB II
11	Ganz-MÁVAG SE	22	2	2	18	26	123	0.211	6	Relegated to NB II
12	Nemzeti	22	2	1	19	16	121	0.132	5	Relegated to NB II

Source: rsssf.com

== Results ==
Home \ Away	BUD	CSE	ERZ	FTC	GAN	KIS	MÁV	MTK	NEM	ÚJP	VAS	ZUG
Budai Barátság		0–4	0–7	0–1	2–2	2–6	5–0	3–4	+:- (Note: The match was settled with a goalless win.)	3–4	2–4	1–3
Csepel	4–2		6–2	2–2	3–1	1–5	8–0	0–2	2–0	2–3	3–1	6–2
Erzsébeti	5–1	3–6		0–2	4–2	+:-	3–0	2–7	3–0	0–7	4–2	3–0
Ferencváros	5–1	2–1	2–0		11–0	1–3	3–0	4–0	9–0	1–0	2–2	8–1
Ganz-MÁVAG	2–5	1–10	1–6	0–3		0–9	1–7	1–3	3–5	0–9	1–7	1–5
Kispest	3–3	0–13	2–0	0–7	3–0		5–0	6–0	2–2	0–8	2–3	5–4
Budapesti MÁVAG	0–1	0–2	2–1	0–5	0–1	1–4		0–5	1–2	0–7	1–8	2–1
MTK Budapest	2–4	2–3	3–1	1–0	1–1	1–3	4–3		2–1	1–3	2–5	1–1
Nemzeti	0–5	0–10	1–9	0–10	2–6	1–7	0–7	0–5		0–7	0–2	2–5
Újpest	1–2	10–1	1–0	3–2	13–2	1–3	12–3	4–0	16–0		3–2	7–1
Vasas	0–1	2–2	3–1	2–1	9–0	2–4	1–1	3–3	6–0	1–1		2–2
Zuglói MaDISz	1–4	1–2	0–0	2–6	6–0	5–2	3–1	3–4	4–0	3–5	2–2	

Source: rsssf.com
Legend: Blue = home team win; Yellow = draw; Red = away team win.

== Statistical leaders ==
=== Top goalscorers ===
Rank	Scorer	Club	Goals
1	(Kingdom of Hungary) Gyula Zsengellér	Újpesti TE	36
2	(Kingdom of Hungary) Mihály Keszthelyi	Csepel SC	35
2	(Kingdom of Hungary) Ferenc Szusza	Újpesti TE	35
4	(Kingdom of Hungary) István Mike	Ferencvárosi TC	28
5	(Kingdom of Hungary) József Mészáros	Kispest AC	23
6	(Kingdom of Hungary) Rudolf Illovszky	Vasas SC	19
6	(Kingdom of Hungary) László Kubala	Ferencvárosi TC	19
8	(Kingdom of Hungary) Lajos Várnai	Újpesti TE	17
9	(Kingdom of Hungary) György Sárosi	Ferencvárosi TC	16
10	(Kingdom of Hungary) Jenő Bosánszky	MTK Budapest	14
