= 1965 Nemzeti Bajnokság I =

Season from national Hungarian championship

Nemzeti Bajnokság I
- Season: 1965
- Country: Hungary
- Teams: 14
- Champions: Vasas SC
- Runner up: Ferencvárosi TC
- Relegated: Komlói Bányász SK; Szegedi EAC
- Top goalscorer: Flórián Albert (27)
- All statistics correct as of 19 August 2026.

The 1965 season was the 63rd completed season of Nemzeti Bajnokság I.

== Overview ==
It was contested by 14 teams, and Vasas SC won the championship.

== League standings ==
Pos	Team	Pld	W	D	L	GF	GA	GR	Pts
1	Vasas SC	26	17	5	4	48	19	2.526	39
2	Ferencvárosi TC	26	14	8	4	66	31	2.129	36
3	Újpesti Dózsa	26	14	5	7	52	30	1.733	33
4	Budapest Honvéd FC	26	12	7	7	47	30	1.567	31
5	Győri ETO FC	26	12	6	8	41	30	1.367	30
6	FC Tatabánya	26	9	9	8	30	32	0.938	27
7	Pécsi Dózsa	26	10	6	10	30	30	1.000	26
8	MTK Budapest FC	26	7	10	9	30	42	0.714	24
9	Salgótarjáni BTC	26	5	13	8	25	37	0.676	23
10	Csepel SC	26	9	4	13	33	37	0.892	22
11	Ózdi Kohász SE	26	9	4	13	29	57	0.509	22
12	Dorogi Bányasz	26	6	9	11	26	40	0.650	21
13	Komlói Bányász SK	26	6	6	14	29	47	0.617	18
14	Szegedi EAC	26	2	8	16	18	42	0.429	12

Source: rsssf.com

== Results ==
Home \ Away	CSE	DOR	FTC	HON	KOM	MTK	ÓZD	PÉC	GYŐ	SAL	SZE	TAT	ÚJP	VAS
Csepel		4–1	2–6	2–0	2–0	1–1	5–0	0–1	0–2	0–1	1–0	1–1	2–1	1–0
Dorogi Bányász	0–0		2–2	2–1	1–0	1–1	5–2	1–2	0–2	1–1	0–0	0–2	0–4	1–0
Ferencváros	2–0	4–0		0–3	4–1	2–4	5–0	1–1	6–2	5–0	1–1	1–1	0–2	0–1
Budapest Honvéd	3–0	3–2	2–2		3–2	0–0	3–0	3–1	1–1	1–0	2–0	3–1	1–3	0–3
Komlói Bányász	3–1	2–2	1–1	0–3		0–2	2–0	1–1	4–1	0–2	1–0	2–0	1–2	1–5
MTK Budapest	0–1	2–1	1–6	1–7	1–3		4–0	0–0	1–1	1–1	2–1	1–1	1–1	0–2
Ózdi Kohász	3–2	2–0	1–3	1–0	2–0	1–1		2–1	3–1	0–1	2–1	2–2	0–1	2–2
Pécsi Dózsa	1–0	1–1	2–5	0–0	1–0	3–1	1–0		1–2	4–0	3–0	2–1	1–0	1–2
Rába ETO Győr	2–0	0–1	0–2	1–1	1–1	4–0	6–0	1–0		4–2	1–0	4–0	1–1	1–2
Salgótarján	1–1	1–1	1–1	3–2	1–1	0–0	0–1	2–1	0–1		1–1	2–2	1–1	1–1
Szegedi EAC	0–3	0–1	0–1	3–4	2–2	2–3	1–2	1–0	0–0	0–0		0–0	2–1	1–1
Tatabányai Bányász	3–2	1–0	1–1	1–0	2–0	1–0	1–1	1–0	0–2	1–1	3–0		2–0	1–2
Újpesti Dózsa	4–2	2–2	1–3	1–1	4–0	1–2	5–1	4–0	2–0	2–1	3–2	3–1		2–3
Vasas	1–0	1–0	1–2	0–0	3–1	1–0	4–1	1–1	2–0	4–1	4–0	2–0	0–1	

Source: rsssf.com
Legend: Blue = home team win; Yellow = draw; Red = away team win.

== Statistical leaders ==
=== Top goalscorers ===
Rank	Scorer	Club	Goals
1	(Hungary) Flórián Albert	Ferencvárosi TC	27
2	(Hungary) Ferenc Bene	Újpesti Dózsa SC	20
2	(Hungary) Lajos Tichy	Budapest Honvéd	20
4	(Hungary) János Farkas	Vasas SC	18
5	(Hungary) Lajos Puskás	Vasas SC	12
5	(Hungary) Béla Szendrei	Ózdi Kohász SE	12
7	(Hungary) László Kalmár	Csepel SC	11
8	(Hungary) István Korsós	Győri Vasas ETO	10
8	(Hungary) István Rottenbiller	Csepel SC	10
10	(Hungary) Lajos Kocsis	Salgótarjáni BTC	9

== Attendances ==
#	Club	Average
1	Ferencváros	38,077
2	MTK	28,077
3	Vasas	24,000
4	Újpest	20,385
5	Budapest Honvéd	17,923
6	Csepel	12,154
7	Pécs	12,000
8	Győr	8,462
9	Ózd	8,385
10	Salgótarján	8,077
11	Tatabánya	7,923
12	Szeged	6,992
13	Dorog	6,000
14	Komlói Bányász	4,769
