= 1957–58 Nemzeti Bajnokság I =

Edition of the hungarian football tournament

Nemzeti Bajnokság I
- Season: 1957–58

Statistics of Nemzeti Bajnokság I in the 1957–58 season.

== Overview ==
It was contested by 14 teams, and MTK Hungária FC won the championship.

== League standings ==
Pos	Team	Pld	W	D	L	GF	GA	GR	Pts
1	MTK Budapest FC	26	15	5	6	51	30	1.700	35
2	Budapest Honvéd FC	26	14	6	6	53	30	1.767	34
3	Ferencvárosi TC	26	14	5	7	53	37	1.432	33
4	FC Tatabánya	26	13	5	8	36	29	1.241	31
5	Vasas SC	26	9	10	7	38	32	1.188	28
6	Salgótarjáni BTC	26	11	5	10	35	39	0.897	27
7	Újpesti Dózsa	26	11	4	11	45	37	1.216	26
8	Szombathelyi Haladás	26	8	10	8	35	35	1.000	26
9	Diósgyőri VTK	26	10	6	10	32	35	0.914	26
10	Csepel SC	26	8	9	9	31	28	1.107	25
11	Dorog	26	9	4	13	32	46	0.696	22
12	Pécsi Dózsa	26	7	5	14	24	50	0.480	19
13	Komlói Bányász SK	26	4	9	13	25	43	0.581	17
14	Szegedi EAC	26	4	7	15	26	45	0.578	15

Source: rsssf.com

== Results ==
Home \ Away	CSE	DIÓ	DOR	FTC	HAL	HON	KOM	MTK	PÉC	SAL	SZE	TAT	ÚJP	VAS
Csepel		2–0	1–2	0–2	2–0	1–3	1–1	1–1	3–0	1–1	4–0	4–0	2–1	1–2
Diósgyőr	0–1		2–0	1–2	2–2	0–1	3–1	2–1	2–1	1–1	3–3	3–1	0–2	3–1
Dorogi Bányász	1–0	2–0		1–5	3–2	0–1	3–3	3–2	0–1	0–1	1–0	0–1	1–1	0–1
Ferencváros	0–0	3–1	6–2		1–3	0–2	3–1	1–2	4–0	5–2	1–1	2–2	1–4	3–2
Haladás	1–1	2–1	1–0	1–4		2–2	0–0	0–1	5–0	4–1	1–1	1–1	2–1	0–0
Budapest Honvéd	1–2	0–1	5–1	0–1	3–1		1–1	3–0	5–0	2–1	5–3	1–2	4–3	0–0
Komlói Bányász	1–1	1–2	1–1	0–1	0–1	3–2		2–2	1–0	4–0	0–1	0–2	1–1	0–1
MTK Budapest	2–1	2–0	0–1	4–1	1–1	2–2	5–1		5–1	2–0	3–1	1–0	2–0	2–2
Pécsi Dózsa	1–1	0–1	3–1	0–1	1–0	1–1	1–0	1–4		1–1	1–0	1–2	2–1	1–1
Salgótarján	0–0	3–0	1–2	1–0	1–3	2–4	2–1	2–1	3–1		2–1	2–0	1–0	1–2
Szegedi EAC	0–0	1–1	1–0	1–2	3–0	0–0	1–1	1–2	2–3	1–2		0–1	1–4	0–4
Tatabányai Bányász	4–0	0–0	2–3	2–0	1–1	1–2	3–0	1–0	3–1	1–0	1–0		1–3	1–0
Újpesti Dózsa	3–1	2–2	3–2	1–1	3–0	0–2	0–1	1–2	3–2	1–3	0–1	2–1		3–0
Vasas	1–0	0–1	2–2	3–3	1–1	2–1	5–0	1–2	0–0	1–1	3–2	2–2	1–2	

Source: rsssf.com
Legend: Blue = home team win; Yellow = draw; Red = away team win.

== Statistical leaders ==
=== Top goalscorers ===
Rank	Scorer	Club	Goals
1	(Hungary) Zoltán Friedmanszky	Ferencvárosi TC	16
1	(Hungary) János Molnár	MTK Budapest	16
3	(Hungary) Béla Csáki	Salgótarjáni BTC	14
3	(Hungary) István Halápi	Újpesti Dózsa	14
3	(Hungary) Lajos Tichy	Budapest Honvéd	14
6	(Hungary) László Lahos	Tatabánya Bányász	13
6	(Hungary) Gyula Szilágyi	Vasas SC	13
8	(Hungary) István Szovják	Tatabánya Bányász	12
9	(Hungary) Tivadar Monostori	Dorogi Bányász	11
10	(Hungary) Oszkár Vilezsál	Ferencvárosi TC	10

== Attendances ==
#	Club	Average
1	Ferencváros	39,308
2	Újpest	24,000
3	Budapest Honvéd	23,308
4	MTK	21,231
5	Diósgyőr	16,077
6	Vasas	16,000
7	Pécs	12,385
8	Csepel	9,923
9	Tatabánya	9,385
10	Haladás	9,308
11	Szeged	8,269
12	Salgótarján	6,423
13	Dorog	4,692
14	Komlói Bányász	4,269
