= 1917–18 Nemzeti Bajnokság I =

Nemzeti Bajnokság I
- Season: 1917–18
- Country: Hungary
- Champions: MTK

Statistics of Nemzeti Bajnokság I for the 1917–18 season.

== Overview ==
It was contested by 12 teams, and MTK Hungária FC won the championship.

== League standings ==
| Pos | Team | Pld | W | D | L | GF | GA | GR | Pts |
|---|---|---|---|---|---|---|---|---|---|
| 1 | MTK Budapest FC | 22 | 21 | 1 | 0 | 147 | 10 | 14.700 | 43 |
| 2 | Ferencvárosi TC | 22 | 14 | 3 | 5 | 42 | 22 | 1.909 | 31 |
| 3 | Törekvés SE | 22 | 12 | 6 | 4 | 45 | 25 | 1.800 | 30 |
| 4 | Vasas SC | 22 | 11 | 5 | 6 | 37 | 26 | 1.423 | 27 |
| 5 | Újpest FC | 22 | 9 | 6 | 7 | 39 | 41 | 0.951 | 24 |
| 6 | III. Kerületi TUE | 22 | 9 | 5 | 8 | 25 | 38 | 0.658 | 23 |
| 7 | 33 FC | 22 | 8 | 3 | 11 | 35 | 35 | 1.000 | 19 |
| 8 | Budapesti AK | 22 | 5 | 6 | 11 | 24 | 42 | 0.571 | 16 |
| 9 | Budapesti TC | 22 | 5 | 4 | 13 | 20 | 58 | 0.345 | 14 |
| 10 | MÁV Gépgyári SK | 22 | 4 | 5 | 13 | 25 | 77 | 0.325 | 13 |
| 11 | Kispest AC | 22 | 2 | 8 | 12 | 26 | 48 | 0.542 | 12 |
| 12 | Magyar AC | 22 | 3 | 6 | 13 | 26 | 69 | 0.377 | 12 |

Source: rsssf.com

== Results ==
| Home \ Away | 33F | KER | BAK | BTC | FTC | KIS | MAC | MÁV | MTK | TÖR | ÚJP | VAS |
|---|---|---|---|---|---|---|---|---|---|---|---|---|
| 33 FC | | 1–1 | 1–2 | 2–0 | 2–1 | 1–2 | 1–1 | 0–1 | 0–4 | 0–3 | 2–2 | 1–2 |
| III. Kerület | 0–2 | | 3–2 | 2–1 | 0–2 | 1–0 | 2–1 | 1–0 | 1–8 | 2–0 | 0–1 | 1–1 |
| Budapesti AK | 2–1 | 0–0 | | 1–2 | 0–2 | 0–0 | 1–5 | 0–2 | 0–6 | 0–3 | 1–1 | 1–2 |
| Budapesti TC | 1–2 | 1–3 | 0–5 | | 1–0 | 0–0 | 2–0 | 1–1 | 1–6 | 2–5 | 3–2 | 0–6 |
| Ferencváros | 3–1 | 2–1 | 2–1 | 1–0 | | 2–2 | 2–0 | 6–1 | 0–3 | 0–0 | 6–0 | 0–2 |
| Kispest | 1–2 | 2–3 | 1–1 | 1–1 | 0–3 | | 2–2 | 7–1 | 0–2 | 0–3 | 0–3 | 0–1 |
| Magyar AC | 0–4 | 0–2 | 1–3 | 2–0 | 1–3 | 3–3 | | 1–2 | 0–10 | 1–2 | 1–1 | 0–0 |
| MÁV Gépgyári | 0–8 | 2–2 | 1–2 | 1–1 | 1–3 | 1–1 | 7–3 | | 0–6 | 0–4 | 1–4 | 1–4 |
| MTK Budapest | 5–0 | 8–0 | 6–1 | 6–0 | 5–0 | 8–0 | 18–1 | 17–0 | | 7–1 | 6–1 | 2–0 |
| Törekvés | 1–0 | 1–0 | 0–0 | 6–0 | 0–1 | 4–2 | 3–1 | 2–2 | 2–2 | | 2–2 | 1–1 |
| Újpest | 2–4 | 0–0 | 2–0 | 6–1 | 1–1 | 3–1 | 0–1 | 1–0 | 1–5 | 2–1 | | 2–1 |
| Vasas | 1–0 | 3–0 | 1–1 | 0–2 | 0–2 | 3–1 | 1–1 | 3–0 | 1–7 | 0–1 | 4–2 | |

Source: rsssf.com
Legend: Blue = home team win; Yellow = draw; Red = away team win.
