= 1942–43 Nemzeti Bajnokság I =

Season of the Hungarian National Championship

Nemzeti Bajnokság I
- Season: 1942–43
- Champions: Csepel SC
- Relegated: Szombathelyi Haladás VSE; Szegedi AK; Törekvés SE

Statistics of Nemzeti Bajnokság I in the 1942–43 season.

== Overview ==
It was contested by 16 teams, and Csepel SC won the championship.

== League standings ==
Pos	Team	Pld	W	D	L	GF	GA	GR	Pts
1	Csepel SC	30	21	3	6	90	51	1.765	45
2	Nagyváradi AC	30	19	4	7	85	49	1.735	42
3	Ferencvárosi TC	30	15	6	9	84	51	1.647	36
4	Gamma FC	30	12	12	6	67	49	1.367	36
5	Salgótarjáni BTC	30	13	8	9	75	66	1.136	34
6	Vasas SC	30	14	5	11	64	49	1.306	33
7	Újpest FC	30	13	7	10	77	70	1.100	33
8	Szolnoki MÁV FC	30	13	6	11	71	53	1.340	32
9	Kispest AC	30	10	6	14	55	63	0.873	26
10	Kolozsvár AC	30	11	4	15	60	70	0.857	26
11	Újvidéki AC	30	10	6	14	52	63	0.825	26
12	DiMÁVAG	30	9	8	13	54	78	0.692	26
13	Elektromos FC	30	10	5	15	63	54	1.167	25
14	Szombathelyi Haladás	30	8	7	15	60	92	0.652	23
15	Szegedi AK	30	8	3	19	60	115	0.522	19
16	Törekvés SE	30	6	6	18	42	86	0.488	18

Source: rsssf.com

== Results ==
Home \ Away	CSE	DIM	ELE	FTC	GAM	HAL	KIS	KOL	NAG	SAL	SZE	SZO	TÖR	ÚJP	ÚJV	VAS
Csepel		9–1	3–2	4–2	6–0	1–2	0–2	3–1	2–8	5–2	4–2	2–2	7–2	3–2	1–1	2–5
DiMÁVAG	2–2		2–1	2–1	0–1	4–1	0–3	0–4	3–3	3–3	2–5	2–5	2–0	2–2	0–1	1–5
Elektromos	2–3	3–0		0–3	1–1	7–0	0–1	1–2	1–2	2–1	4–0	8–2	1–2	4–4	4–0	1–1
Ferencváros	3–1	5–2	2–3		4–0	2–2	3–2	0–1	5–0	3–3	9–2	2–2	4–0	5–4	2–1	3–1
Gamma	0–4	4–0	3–1	1–1		9–1	0–0	7–2	1–1	4–4	0–1	1–1	2–2	3–0	2–2	1–1
Haladás	0–3	1–1	2–4	1–1	4–4		2–2	1–3	3–6	4–2	1–1	3–2	2–3	1–2	2–0	1–7
Kispest	1–3	1–1	1–3	0–5	1–3	1–5		0–4	1–3	0–4	3–4	0–0	1–1	2–1	0–0	0–1
Kolozsvár	1–3	1–1	3–3	2–8	2–3	0–1	2–3		2–3	3–1	5–1	3–2	2–2	2–2	2–6	0–5
Nagyvárad	4–3	3–1	2–0	3–0	3–0	3–1	2–6	2–0		0–1	8–0	3–5	0–0	1–1	7–2	0–1
Salgótarján	0–2	6–1	2–1	2–1	2–2	4–2	3–6	3–2	4–2		2–2	1–1	2–1	3–3	3–3	1–2
Szegedi AK	2–3	1–3	0–4	3–0	1–3	6–1	1–9	1–2	1–8	2–7		4–3	1–6	2–2	1–5	1–3
Szolnok	1–3	0–3	1–0	3–0	0–0	5–2	2–1	3–1	0–1	2–0	8–1		8–1	1–4	2–3	2–1
Törekvés	0–1	2–4	1–1	0–4	1–5	1–6	0–3	0–2	3–1	1–3	4–7	1–0		1–6	2–3	1–1
Újpest	4–0	2–5	3–1	2–2	2–1	6–3	4–3	2–0	1–2	5–2	3–1	1–4	4–1		3–4	3–1
Újvidéki AC	1–2	1–1	1–0	1–2	1–3	0–3	5–0	0–4	1–2	0–2	3–2	0–4	1–2	0–1		4–2
Vasas	0–1	2–5	4–0	3–2	0–3	2–2	1–2	3–2	0–2	1–2	0–2	1–0	2–1	6–2	2–2	

Source: rsssf.com
Legend: Blue = home team win; Yellow = draw; Red = away team win.

== See also ==
- 1942–43 Nemzeti Bajnokság II
- 1942–43 Nemzeti Bajnokság III
