= 1957 Nemzeti Bajnokság I =

Nemzeti Bajnokság I
- Season: 1957

Statistics of Nemzeti Bajnokság I in the 1957 season.

== Overview ==
It was contested by 12 teams, and Vasas SC won the championship.

== League standings ==
Pos	Team	Pld	W	D	L	GF	GA	GR	Pts
1	Vasas SC	11	7	3	1	36	14	2.571	17
2	MTK Budapest FC	11	8	0	3	31	16	1.938	16
3	Újpest FC	11	6	2	3	18	12	1.500	14
4	Ferencvárosi TC	11	5	3	3	16	11	1.455	13
5	Csepel SC	11	5	3	3	18	18	1.000	13
6	Salgótarjáni BTC	11	4	4	3	28	23	1.217	12
7	Pécs Baranya	11	5	2	4	7	12	0.583	12
8	FC Tatabánya	11	3	4	4	13	16	0.813	10
9	Dorogi AC	11	4	2	5	14	21	0.667	10
10	Szegedi EAC	11	1	4	6	13	25	0.520	6
11	Budapest Honvéd FC	11	1	3	7	19	27	0.704	5
12	Szombathelyi Haladás	11	1	2	8	14	32	0.438	4

Source: rsssf.com

== Results ==
Home \ Away	CSE	DOR	FTC	HAL	HON	MTK	PÉC	SAL	SZE	TAT	ÚJP	VAS
Csepel			2–2		4–2		0–0	2–4	1–1			
Dorog	2–3		0–1		3–1		3–0		2–0			
Ferencváros					2–1		3–0	3–2	3–0		1–2	1–1
Haladás	0–1	0–2	2–0			1–8	0–1				1–1	
Budapest Honvéd				2–1				3–3	2–2	2–2		4–5
MTK Budapest	3–2	7–1	1–0		2–1		2–0					
Pécs Baranya					1–0			2–0		1–0	1–1	0–3
Salgótarján		0–0		5–4		5–0				2–2		2–2
Szegedi EAC				2–2		1–4	0–1	2–4		0–2		3–3
Tatabányai Bányász	1–2	1–1	0–0	4–3		1–0					0–1	
Újpesti Dózsa	0–1	4–0			2–1	2–1		3–1	1–2			
Vasas	3–0	4–0		6–0		2–3				4–0	3–1	

Source: rsssf.com
Legend: Blue = home team win; Yellow = draw; Red = away team win.

== Statistical leaders ==
=== Top goalscorers ===
Rank	Scorer	Club	Goals
1	(Hungary) Gyula Szilágyi	Vasas SC	17
2	(Hungary) Nándor Hidegkuti	MTK Budapest	10
3	(Hungary) Béla Csáki	Salgótarjáni BTC	8
3	(Hungary) Lajos Csordás	Vasas	8
3	(Hungary) Mihály Vasas	Salgótarjáni BTC	8
6	(Hungary) Lajos Tichy	Budapest Honvéd	6
7	(Hungary) József Bencsics	Újpesti Dózsa	5
7	(Hungary) Dezső Bundzsák	Vasas SC	5
7	(Hungary) László Jagodics	Salgótarjáni BTC	5
7	(Hungary) Ferenc Machos	Budapest Honvéd	5
7	(Hungary) János Molnár	MTK Budapest	5
7	(Hungary) Ferenc Szusza	Újpesti Dózsa	5

== Attendances ==
No.	Club	Average
1	Ferencváros	48,333
2	Vasas	30,833
3	MTK	20,600
4	Újpest	18,500
5	Csepel	16,200
6	Budapest Honvéd	13,400
7	Pécs	12,167
8	Tatabánya	10,500
9	Szeged	9,200
10	Haladás	7,500
11	Salgótarján	7,200
12	Dorog	5,500
