= 1956 Nemzeti Bajnokság I =

Nemzeti Bajnokság I
- Season: 1956
- Champions: Budapesti Honvéd SE

Statistics of Nemzeti Bajnokság I in the 1956 season.

== Overview ==
It was performed by 12 teams. Season did not finish due to the Hungarian Revolution of 1956.

== League standings ==
| Pos | Team | Pld | W | D | L | GF | GA | GR | Pts | |
|---|---|---|---|---|---|---|---|---|---|---|
| 1 | Budapesti Honvéd SE | 21 | 13 | 3 | 5 | 52 | 29 | 1.793 | 29 | Qualification for the European Cup first round |
| 2 | Budapesti Dózsa | 22 | 11 | 4 | 7 | 30 | 26 | 1.154 | 26 | |
| 3 | Budapesti Vörös Lobogó | 18 | 10 | 5 | 3 | 41 | 24 | 1.708 | 25 | |
| 4 | Budapesti Kinizsi | 22 | 8 | 8 | 6 | 38 | 29 | 1.310 | 24 | |
| 5 | Salgótarjáni BTC | 21 | 9 | 6 | 6 | 32 | 28 | 1.143 | 24 | |
| 6 | Csepel SC | 22 | 7 | 9 | 6 | 30 | 27 | 1.111 | 23 | |
| 7 | FC Tatabánya | 22 | 7 | 8 | 7 | 26 | 28 | 0.929 | 22 | |
| 8 | Vasas SC | 17 | 5 | 6 | 6 | 28 | 28 | 1.000 | 16 | |
| 9 | Dorogi Bányász | 21 | 5 | 6 | 10 | 25 | 35 | 0.714 | 16 | |
| 10 | Szombathelyi Törekvés | 21 | 6 | 4 | 11 | 24 | 35 | 0.686 | 16 | |
| 11 | Pécsi Dózsa | 21 | 5 | 4 | 12 | 21 | 37 | 0.568 | 14 | |
| 12 | Szegedi EAC | 20 | 4 | 5 | 11 | 21 | 42 | 0.500 | 13 | |

Source: rsssf.com

== Results ==
| Home \ Away | CSE | DOR | DÓZ | HON | KIN | PÉC | SAL | SZE | TAT | TÖR | VAS | VÖR |
|---|---|---|---|---|---|---|---|---|---|---|---|---|
| Csepel | | 3–1 | 2–3 | 1–7 | 2–2 | 1–0 | 0–1 | 4–1 | 0–0 | 1–1 | 4–1 | 0–0 |
| Dorogi Bányász | 0–1 | | 3–1 | 1–0 | 2–2 | 0–2 | 0–0 | 1–1 | 3–2 | 3–1 | 0–4 | |
| Budapesti Dózsa | 2–1 | 1–3 | | 0–1 | 0–0 | 1–0 | 1–0 | 5–4 | 0–2 | 3–0 | 4–3 | 1–1 |
| Budapest Honvéd | 2–1 | 3–0 | 1–0 | | 3–2 | 2–3 | 2–1 | 4–0 | 0–1 | 6–1 | 2–1 | 2–3 |
| Budapesti Kinizsi | 1–1 | 3–1 | 1–1 | 1–2 | | 1–0 | 1–1 | 3–0 | 3–2 | 1–0 | 0–1 | 6–2 |
| Pécsi Dózsa | 0–2 | 1–1 | 0–1 | | 1–3 | | 2–2 | 2–1 | 3–1 | 1–1 | 0–0 | 1–3 |
| Salgótarjáni | 0–2 | 1–0 | 1–0 | 4–2 | 1–1 | 6–0 | | 2–1 | 1–1 | 2–0 | 3–1 | 3–2 |
| Szegedi EAC | 1–1 | 2–1 | 0–1 | 2–5 | 2–1 | 2–0 | 0–0 | | 0–2 | 2–1 | | 0–6 |
| Tatabányai Bányász | 0–0 | 1–1 | 0–0 | 2–2 | 1–1 | 3–2 | 2–1 | 1–0 | | 3–2 | 1–1 | 0–3 |
| Törekvés | 1–0 | 2–1 | 1–2 | 1–2 | 2–1 | 0–1 | 4–2 | 1–1 | 1–0 | | 3–1 | |
| Vasas | 3–3 | 3–3 | 1–0 | 2–2 | 1–2 | 2–0 | | | 3–1 | 0–0 | | |
| Vörös Lobogó | 0–0 | 1–0 | 1–3 | 2–2 | 3–2 | 4–2 | 6–0 | 1–1 | 1–0 | 2–1 | | |

Source: rsssf.com
Legend: Blue = home team win; Yellow = draw; Red = away team win.
