= List of Újpest FC seasons =

List of seasons

Újpest Football Club is a professional football club based in Budapest, Hungary.

== Key ==
Nemzeti Bajnokság I

- Pld = Matches played
- W = Matches won
- D = Matches drawn
- L = Matches lost
- GF = Goals for
- GA = Goals against
- Pts = Points
- Pos = Final position

Hungarian football league system

- NBI = Nemzeti Bajnokság I
- NBII = Nemzeti Bajnokság II
- NBIII = Nemzeti Bajnokság III
- MBI = Megyei Bajnokság I

Magyar Kupa

- F = Final
- SF = Semi-finals
- QF = Quarter-finals
- R16 = Round of 16
- R32 = Round of 32
- R64 = Round of 64
- R128 = Round of 128

UEFA

- F = Final
- SF = Semi-finals
- QF = Quarter-finals
- Group = Group stage
- PO = Play-offs
- QR3 = Third qualifying round
- QR2 = Second qualifying round
- QR1 = First qualifying round
- PR = Preliminary round

Winners	Runners-up	Third	Promoted	Relegated

== Seasons ==
As of 17 May 2026.

Season	League										Cup	International		Manager	Ref.
Season	Tier	Div	MP	W	D	L	GF	GA	Pts.	Pos.	Cup	Competition	Result	Manager	Ref.
1901	2	NBII	14	7	2	5	16	11	16	3rd		No competitions held			
1902	2	NBII	14	2	0	12	5	22	4	7th		No competitions held			
1903	2	NBII	10	7	2	1	21	11	16	2nd		No competitions held			
1904	2	NBII ↑	12	12	0	0	84	6	24	1st		No competitions held			
1905	1	NB I	16	8	2	6	35	22	18	4th	NH	No competitions held			
1906–07	1	NB I	14	2	4	8	8	38	8	6th	NH	No competitions held			
1907–08	1	NB I	16	8	2	6	20	27	18	4th	NH	No competitions held			
1908–09	1	NB I	16	3	2	11	19	41	8	8th	NH	No competitions held			
1909–10	1	NB I	16	6	1	9	27	33	13	7th	?	No competitions held			
1910–11	1	NB I ↓	18	2	4	12	23	51	8	10th	?	No competitions held			
1911–12	2	NBII ↑	22	21	0	1	87	16	42	1st	?	No competitions held			
1912–13	1	NB I	18	4	4	10	24	30	12	8th	?	No competitions held			
1913–14	1	NB I	18	4	4	10	28	52	12	7th	?	No competitions held			
1916–17	1	NB I	22	11	5	6	28	28	27	3rd	NH	No competitions held			
1917–18	1	NB I	22	9	6	7	39	41	24	5th	NH	No competitions held			
1918–19	1	NB I	22	12	6	4	39	19	30	3rd	NH	No competitions held			
1919–20	1	NB I	28	11	4	13	39	30	26	7th	NH	No competitions held			
1920–21	1	NB I	24	14	8	2	39	14	36	2nd	NH	No competitions held		(Hungary) Weisz	
1921–22	1	NB I	22	13	6	3	52	19	32	3rd	R	No competitions held		(Hungary) Weisz	
1922–23	1	NB I	22	16	2	4	49	11	34	2nd	R	No competitions held		(Hungary) Holits	
1923–24	1	NB I	22	12	4	6	39	15	28	3rd	NH	No competitions held		(Hungary) Holits	
1924–25	1	NB I	22	7	8	7	29	18	22	5th	R	No competitions held		(Hungary) Hlavay	
1925–26	1	NB I	22	11	5	6	48	29	27	4th	?	No competitions held		(Hungary) Holits	
1926–27	1	NB I	18	10	3	5	33	20	23	2nd	?	No competitions held		(Hungary) Pozsonyi	
1927–28	1	NB I	22	15	4	3	62	25	34	3rd	?	No competitions held		(Hungary) Pozsonyi	
1928–29	1	NB I	22	13	4	5	64	35	30	3rd	NH	Mitropa Cup	W	(Hungary) Bányai	
1929–30	1	NB I	22	18	2	2	74	30	38	1st	?	Did not qualify		(Hungary) Bányai	
1930–31	1	NB I	22	16	3	3	71	33	35	1st	?	Coupe Des Nations	W	(Hungary) Bányai	
1931–32	1	NB I	22	16	4	2	67	32	36	2nd	?	Did not qualify		(Hungary) Bányai	
1932–33	1	NB I	22	17	3	2	89	30	37	1st	R	Did not qualify		(Hungary) Tóth Potya	
1933–34	1	NB I	22	16	5	1	68	25	37	2nd	?	Did not qualify		(Hungary) Tóth Potya	
1934–35	1	NB I	22	15	5	2	66	17	35	1st	?	Did not qualify		(Hungary) Jánossy	
1935–36	1	NB I	26	19	5	2	86	29	43	2nd	TBD	Did not qualify		(Hungary) Jánossy	
1936–37	1	NB I	26	17	3	6	101	39	37	3rd	TBD	Did not qualify		(Hungary) Jánossy	
1937–38	1	NB I	26	21	2	3	90	32	44	2nd	TBD	Did not qualify		(Hungary) Sternberg	
1938–39	1	NB I	26	20	4	2	107	26	44	1st	TBD	Mitropa Cup	W	(Hungary) Guttmann	
1939–40	1	NB I	26	15	8	3	60	34	38	3rd	TBD	Did not qualify		(Hungary) Mészáros	
1940–41	1	NB I	26	15	4	7	79	57	34	2nd	TBD	Did not qualify		(Hungary) Takács	
1941–42	1	NB I	30	18	8	4	95	42	44	2nd	TBD	Did not qualify		(Hungary) Takács	
1942–43	1	NB I	30	13	7	10	77	70	33	7th	TBD	Did not qualify		(Hungary) Takács, (Hungary) Lutz	
1943–44	1	NB I	30	13	7	10	92	59	33	5th	TBD	Did not qualify		(Hungary) Kertész	
1945	1	NB I	22	18	1	3	125	27	37	1st	TBD	Did not qualify		(Hungary) Takács	
1945–46	1	NB I	44	40	3	1	218	52	83	1st	TBD	Did not qualify		(Hungary) Jávor	
1946–47	1	NB I	30	21	5	4	106	43	47	1st	TBD	Did not qualify		(Hungary) Jávor, (Hungary) Guttmann	
1947–48	1	NB I	32	18	8	6	83	43	44	5th	TBD	Did not qualify		(Hungary) Vincze, (Hungary) Sós	
1948–49	1	NB I	30	18	5	7	89	47	41	4th	TBD	Did not qualify		(Hungary) Balogh, (Hungary) Ember	
1949–50	1	NB I	30	14	9	7	71	52	37	5th	TBD	Did not qualify		(Hungary) Kemény	
1950	1	NB I	15	9	3	3	37	23	21	3rd	TBD	Did not qualify		(Hungary) Opata	
1951	1	NB I	26	12	7	7	64	44	31	3rd	TBD	Did not qualify		(Hungary) Opata, (Hungary) Jávor	
1952	1	NB I	26	14	8	4	67	43	36	3rd	TBD	Did not qualify		(Hungary) Jávor	
1953	1	NB I	26	11	8	7	54	42	30	4th	TBD	Did not qualify		(Hungary) Jávor	
1954	1	NB I	26	11	4	11	54	49	26	5th	TBD	Did not qualify		(Hungary) Jávor, (Hungary) Kolozsvári	
1955	1	NB I	26	7	8	11	45	44	22	8th	TBD	Did not qualify		(Hungary) Bukovi	
1957	1	NB I	11	6	2	3	18	12	14	3rd	TBD	Did not qualify		(Hungary) Balogh	
1957–58	1	NB I	26	11	4	11	45	37	26	7th	TBD	Did not qualify		(Hungary) Balogh	
1958–59	1	NB I	26	12	7	7	50	38	31	5th	TBD	Inter-Cities Fairs Cup	1R	(Hungary) Balogh	
1959–60	1	NB I	26	17	6	3	52	26	40	1st	TBD	Did not qualify		(Hungary) Szűcs	
1960–61	1	NB I	26	14	6	6	51	30	34	2nd	TBD	European Cup/Inter-Cities Fairs Cup	1R/1R	(Hungary) Fenyvesi	
1961–62	1	NB I	26	15	6	5	57	30	36	2nd	TBD	Cup Winners' Cup	SF	(Hungary) Kalocsay	
1962–63	1	NB I	26	11	8	7	50	31	30	3rd	TBD	Cup Winners' Cup	1R	(Hungary) Szűcs	
1963	1	NB I	13	6	2	5	20	19	14	6th	TBD	Did not qualify		(Hungary) Szusza	
1964	1	NB I	26	14	5	7	53	38	33	5th	TBD	Inter-Cities Fairs Cup	QF	(Hungary) Szusza	
1965	1	NB I	26	14	5	7	52	30	33	3rd	TBD	Did not qualify		(Hungary) Szusza, (Hungary) Balogh	
1966	1	NB I	26	13	6	7	67	39	32	4th	TBD	Inter-Cities Fairs Cup	QF	(Hungary) Balogh	
1967	1	NB I	30	18	8	4	89	36	44	2nd	TBD	Did not qualify		(Hungary) Baróti	
1968	1	NB I	30	20	8	2	102	27	48	2nd	TBD	Did not qualify		(Hungary) Baróti	
1969	1	NB I	30	20	8	2	83	27	48	1st	W	Inter-Cities Fairs Cup	R	(Hungary) Baróti	
1970	1	NB I	14	11	1	2	37	13	23	1st	W	Inter-Cities Fairs Cup	3R	(Hungary) Baróti	
1970–71	1	NB I	30	18	7	5	71	29	51	1st	TBD	European Cup	1R	(Hungary) Baróti	
1971–72	1	NB I	30	20	6	4	78	30	46	1st	TBD	European Cup	QF	(Hungary) Kovács	
1972–73	1	NB I	30	21	4	5	81	21	46	1st	TBD	European Cup	QF	(Hungary) Kovács	
1973–74	1	NB I	30	18	6	6	75	33	42	1st	TBD	European Cup	SF	(Hungary) Szűcs	
1974–75	1	NB I	28	20	5	3	71	33	45	1st	W	European Cup	2R	(Hungary) Várhidi	
1975–76	1	NB I	30	18	6	6	79	51	42	3rd	TBD	European Cup	2R	(Hungary) Várhidi	
1976–77	1	NB I	34	22	6	6	88	47	50	2nd	TBD	UEFA Cup	1R	(Hungary) Várhidi	
1977–78	1	NB I	34	19	13	2	95	46	51	1st	TBD	UEFA Cup	2R	(Hungary) Várhidi	
1978–79	1	NB I	34	21	10	3	84	38	52	1st	TBD	European Cup	1R	(Hungary) Várhidi	
1979–80	1	NB I	34	19	7	8	86	64	45	2nd	TBD	European Cup	1R	(Hungary) Várhidi	
1980–81	1	NB I	34	10	16	8	53	49	36	8th	TBD	UEFA Cup	1R	(Hungary) Szusza	
1981–82	1	NB I	34	14	12	8	49	37	40	5th	W	Did not qualify		(Hungary) Temesvári	
1982–83	1	NB I	30	12	8	10	45	47	32	5th	W	Cup Winners' Cup	2R	(Hungary) Temesvári	
1983–84	1	NB I	30	12	11	7	49	33	35	4th	TBD	Cup Winners' Cup	QF	(Hungary) Temesvári	
1984–85	1	NB I	30	10	8	12	37	35	28	10th	TBD	Did not qualify		(Hungary) Temesvári	
1985–86	1	NB I	30	8	9	13	32	44	25	11th	TBD	Did not qualify		(Hungary) Göröcs	
1986–87	1	NB I	30	16	8	6	47	23	40	2nd	W	Did not qualify		(Hungary) Göröcs	
1987–88	1	NB I	30	12	13	5	48	29	37	3rd	TBD	Cup Winners' Cup	1R	(Hungary) Göröcs	
1988–89	1	NB I	30	11	2/4	13	37	35	41	9th	TBD	UEFA Cup	2R	(Hungary) Göröcs	
1989–90	1	NB I	30	18	4	8	43	20	58	1st	TBD	Did not qualify		(Hungary) Varga	
1990–91	1	NB I	30	13	4	13	36	39	30	9th	TBD	European Cup	1R	(Hungary) Kovács	
1991–92	1	NB I	30	8	13	9	41	38	29	8th	W	Did not qualify		(Hungary) Kovács	
1992–93	1	NB I	30	4	12	14	29	45	20	14th	TBD	Cup Winners' Cup	1R	(Hungary) Bene	
1993–94	1	NB I	30	13	8	9	44	35	34	6th	TBD	Did not qualify		(Hungary) Garami	
1994–95	1	NB I	30	15	7	8	57	34	52	2nd	TBD	Did not qualify		(Hungary) Garami	
1995–96	1	NB I	30	12	12	6	43	31	48	3rd	TBD	UEFA Cup	1R	(Hungary) Garami	
1996–97	1	NB I	34	23	7	4	75	35	76	2nd	TBD	Did not qualify		(Hungary) Nagy	
1997–98	1	NB I	34	21	10	3	62	26	73	1st	R	UEFA Cup	2QR	(Hungary) Várhidi	
1998–99	1	NB I	34	20	3	11	58	40	63	3rd	TBD	Champions League	2QR	(Hungary) Várhidi	
1999–2000	1	NB I	32	10	11	11	46	42	41 ^{1}	10th	TBD	UEFA Cup	QR	(Hungary) Glázer, (Hungary) Várhidi	
2000–01	1	NB I	36	17	9	10	73	56	65 ^{2}	5th	TBD	Did not qualify		(Hungary) Kisteleki	
2001–02	1	NB I	38	14	8	16	65	69	50	6th	W	Did not qualify		(Hungary) Glázer, (Hungary) Molnár	
2002–03	1	NB I	32	15	7	10	54	41	52	4th	TBD	UEFA Cup	1R	(Hungary) Szabó, (Hungary) Sarlós, (Hungary) Mezey	
2003–04	1	NB I	32	15	11	6	48	29	56	2nd	TBD	Did not qualify		(Hungary) Mészöly	
2004–05	1	NB I	30	15	10	5	60	34	55	4th	TBD	UEFA Cup	1R	(Hungary) Mészöly	
2005–06	1	NB I	30	20	5	5	74	37	65	2nd	TBD	Did not qualify		(Hungary) Mészöly, (Hungary) Bicskei	
2006–07	1	NB I	30	15	4	11	39	32	46 ^{3}	4th	TBD	UEFA Cup	1QR	(Belgium) Billen, (Hungary) Urbányi	
2007–08	1	NB I	30	16	7	7	58	40	55	4th	TBD	Did not qualify		(Hungary) Urbányi, (Hungary) Szentes	
2008–09	1	NB I	30	17	8	5	61	38	59	2nd	TBD	Did not qualify		(Hungary) Szentes	
2009–10	1	NB I	30	17	4	9	49	39	55	4th	TBD	Europa League	2QR	(Scotland) McStay	
2010–11	1	NB I	30	13	6	11	50	38	45	6th	TBD	Did not qualify		(Hungary) Mészöly	
2011–12	1	NB I	30	8	8	14	34	46	32	13th	TBD	Did not qualify		(Hungary) Mészöly, (Serbia) Spisljak	
2012–13	1	NB I	30	11	8	11	40	42	41	9th	TBD	Did not qualify		(Belgium) Leliévre, (Belgium) Daerden	
2013–14	1	NB I	30	8	8	14	46	51	32	13th	W	Did not qualify		(Hungary) Kozma, (Belgium) Leliévre	
2014–15	1	NB I	30	14	9	7	40	28	51	6th	SF	Did not qualify		(Serbia) Vignjević	
2015–16	1	NB I	33	11	13	9	42	37	46	6th	R	Did not qualify		(Serbia) Vignjević	
2016–17	1	NB I	33	10	12	11	47	51	42	7th	QF	Did not qualify		(Serbia) Vignjević	
2017–18	1	NB I	33	12	13	8	41	38	49	3rd	W	Did not qualify		(Serbia) Vignjević	
2018–19	1	NB I	33	12	12	9	38	28	48	5th	R32	Europa League	2QR	(Serbia) Vignjević	
2019–20	1	NB I	33	12	7	14	45–	45	43	6th	R16	Did not qualify		(Serbia) Vignjević, (Serbia) Rogan	
2020–21	1	NB I	33	12	6	15	46	67	42	6th	W	Did not qualify		(Serbia) Rogan, (Germany) Oenning	
2021–22	1	NB I	33	12	8	13	50	48	44	5th	SF	Conference League	3QR	(Germany) Oenning, (Serbia) Kruščić, Vignjević	
2022–23	1	NB I	33	11	8	14	42	55	41	8th	R16	Did not qualify		(Serbia) Vignjević	
2023–24	1	NB I	33	11	4	18	45	67	37	10th	R16	Did not qualify		(Serbia) Vignjević, (Hungary) Mészöly	
2024–25	1	NB I	33	9	14	10	38	44	41	7th	QF	Did not qualify		(Sweden) Grzelak, (Croatia) Krznar	
2025–26	1	NB I	33	11	7	15	48	57	40	7th	R64	Did not qualify		(Croatia) Krznar, (Hungary) Bodor, (Hungary) Szélesi	
2026–27	1	NB I	0	0	0	0	0	0	0		R64	Did not qualify		(Hungary) Szélesi	

Notes

- Note 1: 3 points deducted due to the illegal appearance of a player
- Note 2: Újpest finished 2nd in the first part of the season
- Note 3: 3 points deducted due to racist comments against the Debrecen Hungarian League match on 4 May 2007
- Note 4: Defunct
