= History of Újpest FC =

The history of Újpest FC begins with its founding in 1885. The club have won the Hungarian League 20 times and the Hungarian Cup 8 times.

== Early years ==
The club was founded on 16 June 1885 by school teacher János Goll in Újpest, a separate city in those times, just next to the borders of Budapest under the name Újpesti Torna Egylet. It was formed first as a general athletic club, performing gymnastics and fencing, and its motto was "Soundness, Strength, Harmony" (Hungarian: Épség, Erő, Egyetértés). In 1899, a football club was formed in the city of Újpest under the name Újpesti FC and with the same colours, purple and white. The first official match of Újpesti FC was a 1:1 draw on 29 April 1900 against III. Kerületi TVE. In 1901 the two clubs (UTE and Újpesti FC) merged and formed the football division of Újpesti TE and the club joined the second division of the newly formed Hungarian League. Újpest is ever since one of two teams in Hungary that have never missed a season since the beginnings of league games in the country.

Újpest were promoted to the first division in 1904 and they have managed to play on top flight ever since except for the season of 1911–12 when they finished as champions of the second division after a one-year relegation.

== The first golden era ==
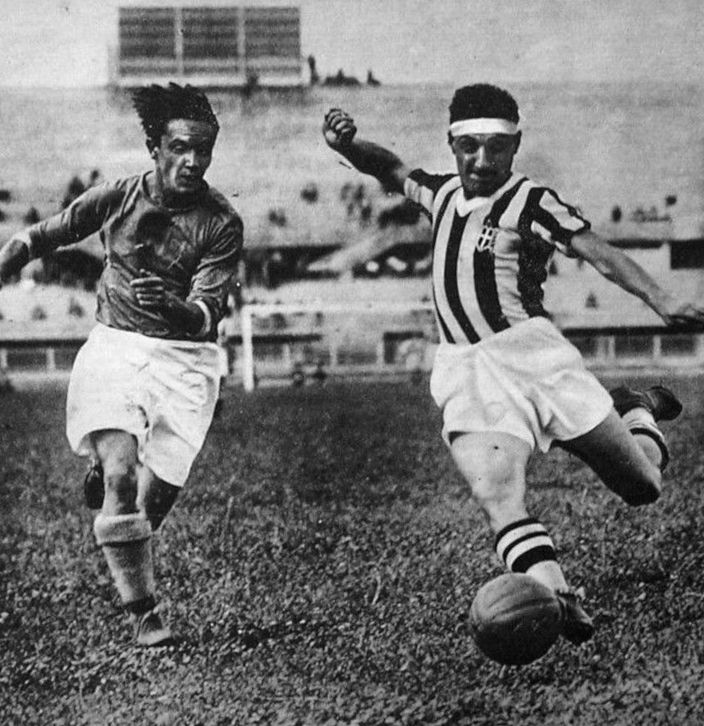
Újpest in the away tie versus Juventus, 1934 Central European Cup quarter-finals.

The club built the new Megyeri úti stadion in 1922, which marked the opening of a new era of medal collection. The legendary "Fogl-gate" (Fogl-gát in Hungarian), a massive defending formation of brothers Károly Fogl II and József Fogl III for both the national team and Újpest was the key point for the club's successes. From 1926, after the introduction of professional football in Hungary, the football team was playing under the name Újpest FC. The late 1920s and 30s brought the first golden age of the club, marked by finishing on top of the Hungarian first division 5 times and international cup success, including two Mitropa Cup titles in 1929 and 1939, and also the Cup of Nations title in 1930. In the 1938–39 season, Béla Guttmann coached the team to wins of the Hungarian League and the Mitropa Cup (the precursor to the European Cup). The team finished on one of the first three positions in every season between 1926 and 1942, and played in five cup finals during the 1920s and 30s.

Újpest gave 5 players for the World Cup of 1938 to silver medalist Hungary including György Szűcs, Antal Szalay, István Balogh I, Jenő Vincze, and the rising star of Hungarian football, Gyula Zsengellér.

== After World War II ==
The first years after World War II saw the second golden era of Újpest, and saw the club on the top of the championship three times in a row, once even giving 9 players to the Hungary national team. Players like Ferenc Szusza, Béla Egresi, Sándor Balogh II, István Nyers or Mihály Nagymarosi were setting records of winning 30 consecutive games, or scoring 187 goals in one single season. Béla Guttmann in early 1947 rejoined Újpest FC, then known as Újpesti TE, and won another Hungarian League title.

In 1950 the communist government chose Újpest as official club of the police and renamed them Budapesti Dózsa (after György Dózsa), a fairly common practice in Eastern Bloc countries (except that in other places "police clubs" were typically named Dinamo/Dynamo) and two decades of moderate league and cup success followed. In 1951, defender Sándor Szűcs, after being executed by the communist government for high treason during a secret pre-arranged trial, became a martyr of the club. As a result of the less successful years, Mihály Tóth was just one of two Újpest players in 1954 World Cup squad, and the only one to play in the final. During the 1956 revolution, the club renamed itself Újpesti TE; however, after the revolution was pulled down by the Soviets, the Hungarian government – unlike for FTC or MTK – didn't let the club use their old name. This resulted the name Újpesti Dózsa, which was referring both to the district and to the police. After 13 years without a league title, Újpest became champions of Hungary in 1959–60, and reached the Cup Winners' Cup semi-final in 1962 with the help of the new star, János Göröcs.

== 1960s ==
Újpest won the 1959–60 season of the Hungarian League. Therefore, Újpest were eligible to enter the European Cup 1960-61 season. On 28 September 1960, Újpest beat Red Star Belgrade 2–1 at the Jugoslavenska Narodna Armija in Belgrade. On 12 October 1960, Újpest beat Crvena Zvezda 3–0 at the Megyeri úti Stadium. In the first round, on 6 November 1960, Újpest were beaten 6–2 by Benfica at the Estádio da Luz in Lisbon. On 30 November 1960, Újpest beat Benfica 2–1 at the Népstadion.

In the same season, Újpest entered the 1960–61 Inter-Cities Fairs Cup. In the first round, on 16 October 1960, Újpest lost 3–2 to Birmingham City at the St Andrew's, in Birmingham, while in the second leg, played on 26 October 1960, Újpest lost 2–1 at the Megyeri úti Stadium.

Újpest entered the 1961–62 European Cup Winners' Cup. In the first round Újpest beat Floriana F.C. 5–2 at the Independence Ground, Floriana, Malta. In the second leg, Újpest beat Floriana F.C. 10–2 at the Megyeri úti Stadium. In the second round, Újpest lost to Ajax Amsterdam 2–1 at the Olympic Stadium. In the second leg, Újpest beat Ajax Amsterdam 3–1 at the Megyeri úti Stadium. In the quarter-finals, Újpest beat 4–3 Dunfermline Athletic F.C. at the Megyeri úti Stadium. In the second leg, Újpest beat Dunfermline Athletic F.C. 1–0 at the East End Park, in Dunfermline, Scotland. In the semi-finals, Újpest lost 2–0 to ACF Fiorentina at the Stadio Artemio Franchi, Florence, Italy. In the second leg, Újpest were beaten by ACF Fiorentina 1–0 at the Megyeri úti Stadium. Reaching the semi-finals of the 1961–62 European Cup Winners' Cup has been the biggest international achievement of Újpest until now.

21 March 1962

Fiorentina (Italy)	2–0	(Hungary) Újpest Dózsa
Hamrin 6', 47'	Report; Report 2

Stadio Artemio Franchi, Florence
Referee: John Kelly (England)
11 April 1962

Újpest Dózsa (Hungary)	0–1	(Italy) Fiorentina
	Report; Report 2	Bartu 56'

Megyeri úti stadion, Budapest
Referee: Referee: Friedrich Mayer (Austria)

Újpest entered the Inter-Cities Fairs Cup 1968-69 season. In the first round, Újpest walkovered US Luxembourg. In the second round, Újpest beat Aris 2–1 at the Kleanthis Vikelidis Stadium, Thessaloniki, Greece. In the second leg, Újpest won 9–1 at the Megyeri úti Stadium and qualified for the third round. In the third round Újpest beat Legia Warsaw 1–0 at the Polish Army Stadium, Warsaw, Poland. In the second leg, Újpest drew with Legia Warsaw (2–2). In the quarter-finals, Újpest beat Leeds United F.C. 1–0 at the Elland Road, Leeds, England. In the second leg, Újpest won 2–0 and qualified for the semi-finals on 3–0 aggregate. In the semi-finals, Újpest beat Göztepe A.Ş. 4–1 at the İzmir Atatürk Stadium, İzmir, Turkey.

1969-05-29

Newcastle United (England)	3–0	(Hungary) Újpesti Dózsa
Moncur 63' 72'; Scott 83'

St James' Park, Newcastle upon Tyne
Attendance: 60,000
1969-06-11

Újpesti Dózsa (Hungary)	2–3	(England) Newcastle United
Bene 31'; János Göröcs 44'		Moncur 46'; Arentoft 50'; Foggon 74'

Megyeri úti stadion, Budapest
Attendance: 37,000

Újpest won the 1969 season of the Hungarian Cup by beating Budapest Honvéd FC 3–2 in the final. Therefore, Újpest were eligible to enter the Inter-Cities Fairs Cup 1969-70 season. In the first leg Újpest lost 2–1 to FK Partizan in Belgrade, Yugoslavia. The second leg was won by Újpest 2–0 at the Megyeri úti Stadium. In the second round, Újpest lost 5–2 to Club Brugge KV in Bruges, Belgium. The second leg was won by Újpest 3–0 which meant the qualification for the third round on away goals rule. In the third round, Újpest lost 1–0 to FC Carl Zeiss Jena at the Ernst-Abbe-Sportfeld, in Jena, East Germany. The second leg was also won by FC Carl Zeiss Jena (3–0) which resulted the farewell of Újpest.

== 1970s ==
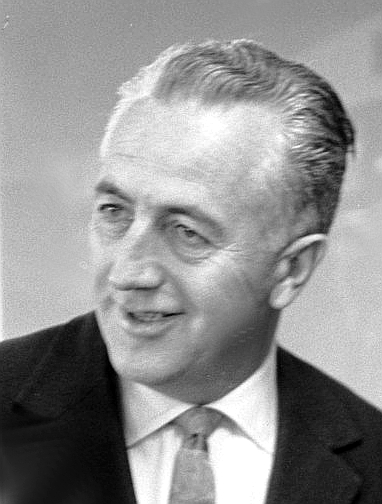
Lajos Baróti managed Újpest between 1967–71

The year 1967, when manager Lajos Baróti was signed by the club leaders, marked the start of a new golden era. After two silver medals, Újpest won the league in 1969 and played in the Inter-Cities Fairs Cup final in the same year (and lost with a result of 2–6 on aggregate against Newcastle United). The team started seven wins in a row in the league, Újpest won all the seasons from 1969 to 1975, setting incredible post-war records like scoring exactly 500 goals in the seven seasons or losing only 4 home matches in 10 seasons. The club enjoyed success in the other domestic competition, winning the Hungarian Cup for the first time in 1969, and also in 1970 & 1975. On international level besides the Inter-Cities Faris Cup final, Újpesti Dózsa reached the European Cup quarter-finals in three consecutive year after 1972 and once even played in the semi-final in 1974, where only the later winners Bayern Munich could put a stop to the campaign. The club was considered one of the best teams in Europe beating such teams like English champions Leeds United in 1969, Spanish champion Valencia CF in 1971, Scottish champion Celtic Glasgow in 1972, or Portuguese top team Benfica in 1973.

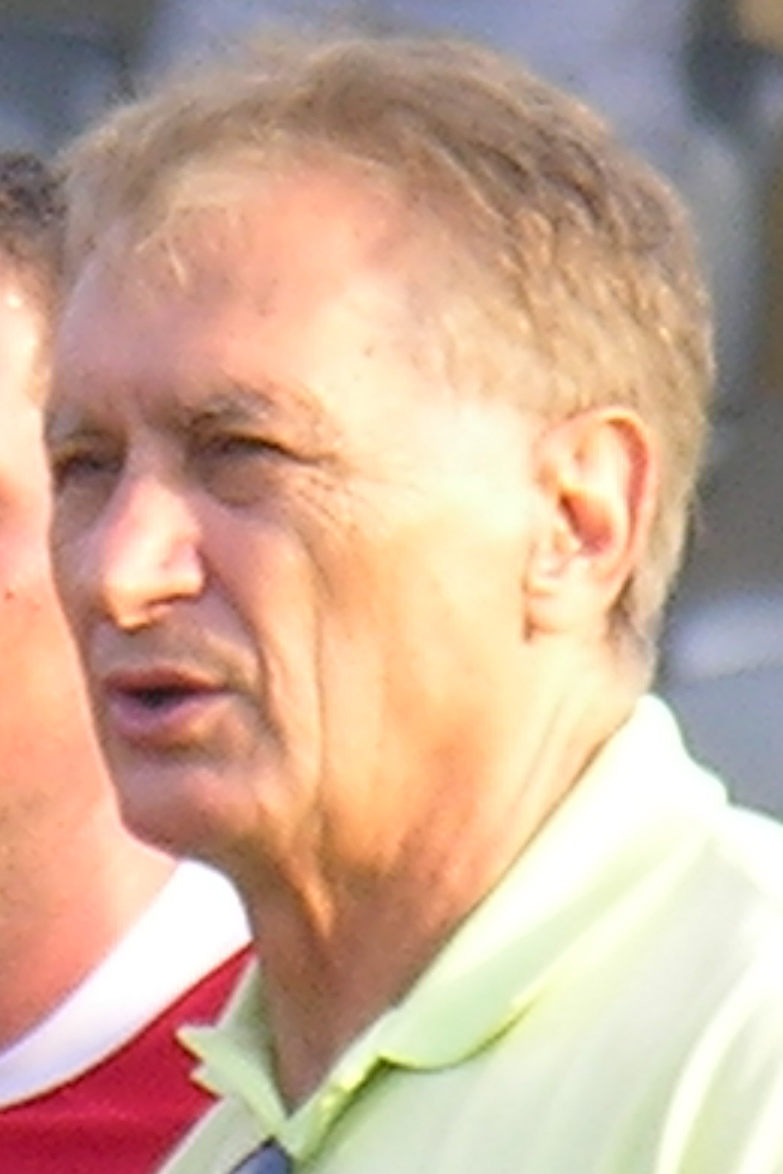
Antal Dunai (photographed in Telki) scored 202 goals in 326 matches between 1965 and 1976

The 'landmark' of the team – as always for Újpest – was goal scoring. The Fazekas – Göröcs – Bene – Dunai II – Zámbó attacking formation, invented and led by manager Lajos Baróti, scored dozens of goals, attracted thousands of football fans both in Hungary and outside the country. Bene became the top scorer of Hungary 5 times, and Dunai II and Fazekas won the Silver boot award for scoring the second most goals in the continent.

After Göröcs, Bene and Dunai left the team, András Törőcsik and László Fekete joined Újpest to reach two more league titles in 1978 and 1979 with former player Pál Várhidi as the head coach. Törőcsik was considered a "magician" by the fans of the club, making unbelievable dribbles, scoring amazing goals and getting unexpected assists to teammates, while Fekete also won the European Silver boot.

Újpest won the 1970 season of the Hungarian Cup by beating Komlói Bányász SK 3–2 in the final.

Újpest won the 1970 season of the Hungarian League. As a consequence, Újpest were eligible for entering the European Cup 1970-71 season. In the first round, Újpest beat Crvena Zvezda 2–0 at the Megyeri úti Stadium on 16 September 1970. On 30 September 1970, Crvena Zvezda beat Újpest 4–0 at the Crvena Zvezda Stadium, Belgrade, Yugoslavia.

Újpest won the 1970–71 season of the Hungarian League. Therefore, Újpest entered the European Cup 1971-72 season. On 15 September 1971, Újpest beat Malmö FF 4–0 at the Megyeri úti Stadium. On 29 September 1971, Újpest lost to Malmö FF 1–0 at the Malmö Stadion, Malmö, Sweden. In the second round, Újpest faced with the La Liga 1970-71 champion, Valencia CF. On 20 October 1971, Újpest beat Valencia CF at the Estadi de Mestalla, Valencia, Spain. On 3 November 1971, Újpest beat Valencia CF 2–1 at the Megyeri úti Stadium. In the knockout phase, Újpest lost 1–0 to the 1970–71 Scottish Division One-winner Celtic F.C. at the Megyeri úti Stadium on 8 March 1972. On 22 March 1971, Újpest drew with Celtic F.C. (1–1) at the Celtic Park, Glasgow, Scotland, which resulted the farewell of Újpest.

Újpest won the 1971–72 season of the Hungarian League. As a consequence, Újpest could enter the European Cup 1972-73 season. On 13 September 1972, Újpest beat FC Basel 2–0 at the Megyeri úti Stadium in the first leg of the first round. On 27 September 1972, Basel beat Újpest 3–2 at the St. Jakob-Park, Basel, Switzerland. However, Újpest qualified for the second round on 4–3 aggregate. On 25 October 1972, Újpest lost 2–1 to the 1971–72 Scottish Division One-winner Celtic F.C. at the Celtic Park, Glasgow, Scotland. On 8 November 1972, Újpest beat Celtic F.C. 3–0 at the Megyeri úti Stadium, Budapest. In the knockout phase, Újpest drew (0–0) with Juventus FC at the Stadio Olimpico di Torino, Turin, Italy on 7 March 1973. On 21 March 1973, Újpest drew (2–2) with the Serie A 1971-72-champions and were eliminated from the European Cup 1972-73.

Újpest won the 1972–73 season of the Hungarian League. Therefore, Újpest were eligible to participate in the European Cup 1973-74 season. On 19 September 1973, Újpest beat 1972–73 League of Ireland-champions Waterford F.C. at Lansdowne Road in Dublin, Republic of Ireland. On 3 October 1973, Újpest beat Waterford F.C. 3–0 at the Megyeri úti Stadium. On 24 October 1973, Újpest drew with Benfica at the Estádio da Luz (1954) in Lisbon, Portugal. The only Portuguese goalscorer was Eusébio. On 7 November 1973, Újpest beat the two-times European Cup-champions Benfica 2–0 at the Megyeri úti Stadium. In the knockout phase, Újpest drew (1–1) with 1972–73 Czechoslovak First League-champions FC Spartak Trnava at the Štadión Antona Malatinského in Trnava, Czechoslovakia on 6 March 1974. On 20 March 1974, Újpest drew (1–1) with FC Spartak Trnava at the Megyeri úti Stadium. However, Újpest qualified for the semi-finals on penalty shootout (4–3). On 10 April, Újpest drew with 1972–73 Bundesliga-champions FC Bayern Munich at the Népstadion. On 24 April 1974, FC Bayern Munich beat Újpest 3–0 at the Olympiastadion, in Munich, West Germany.

10 April 1974
18:00

Újpesti Dózsa (Hungary)	1–1	(West Germany) Bayern Munich
Fazekas 18'	Report	Torstensson 38'

Népstadion
Referee: Sergio Gonella (Italy)
24 April 1974
20:00

Bayern Munich (West Germany)	3–0	(Hungary) Újpesti Dózsa
Torstensson 33'; Horváth 70' (o.g.); Müller 81'	Report

Olympiastadion
Referee: Pavel Kazakov (Soviet Union)

Újpest won the 1973–74 season of the Hungarian League. Consequently, Újpest were eligible to enter the European Cup 1974-75 season. On 18 September 1974, Újpest beat A PFG 1973-74-champions PFC Levski Sofia 3–0 at the Georgi Asparuhov Stadium, in Sofia, Bulgaria. On 2 October 1974, Újpest beat PFC Levski Sofia 4–1 at the Megyeri úti Stadium. On 23 October 1974, Újpest lost to Leeds United F.C. 2–1 at the Megyeri úti Stadium. On 6 November 1974, Leeds United F.C. beat Újpest 3–0 at the Elland Road, Beeston, Leeds, England, which the end of the European Cup season.

Újpest won the 1974–75 season of the Hungarian League. As a consequence, Újpest were eligible to enter the European Cup 1975-76. On 17 September 1975, Újpest beat 1974–75 Nationalliga A-champions FC Zürich 4–0 at the Megyeri úti Stadium. On 1 October 1975, Újpest lost to FC Zürich 5–1, but Újpest qualified for the second round on away goals rule. On 22 October 1975, Újpest were beaten by 1974–75 Primeira Divisão-champions Benfica 5–2 at the Estádio da Luz (1954), Lisbon, Portugal. On 5 November 1975, Újpest beat Benfica 3–1 at the Megyeri úti Stadium.

Újpest won the 1974–75 season of the Hungarian Cup by beating Szombathelyi Haladás 3–2 in the final.

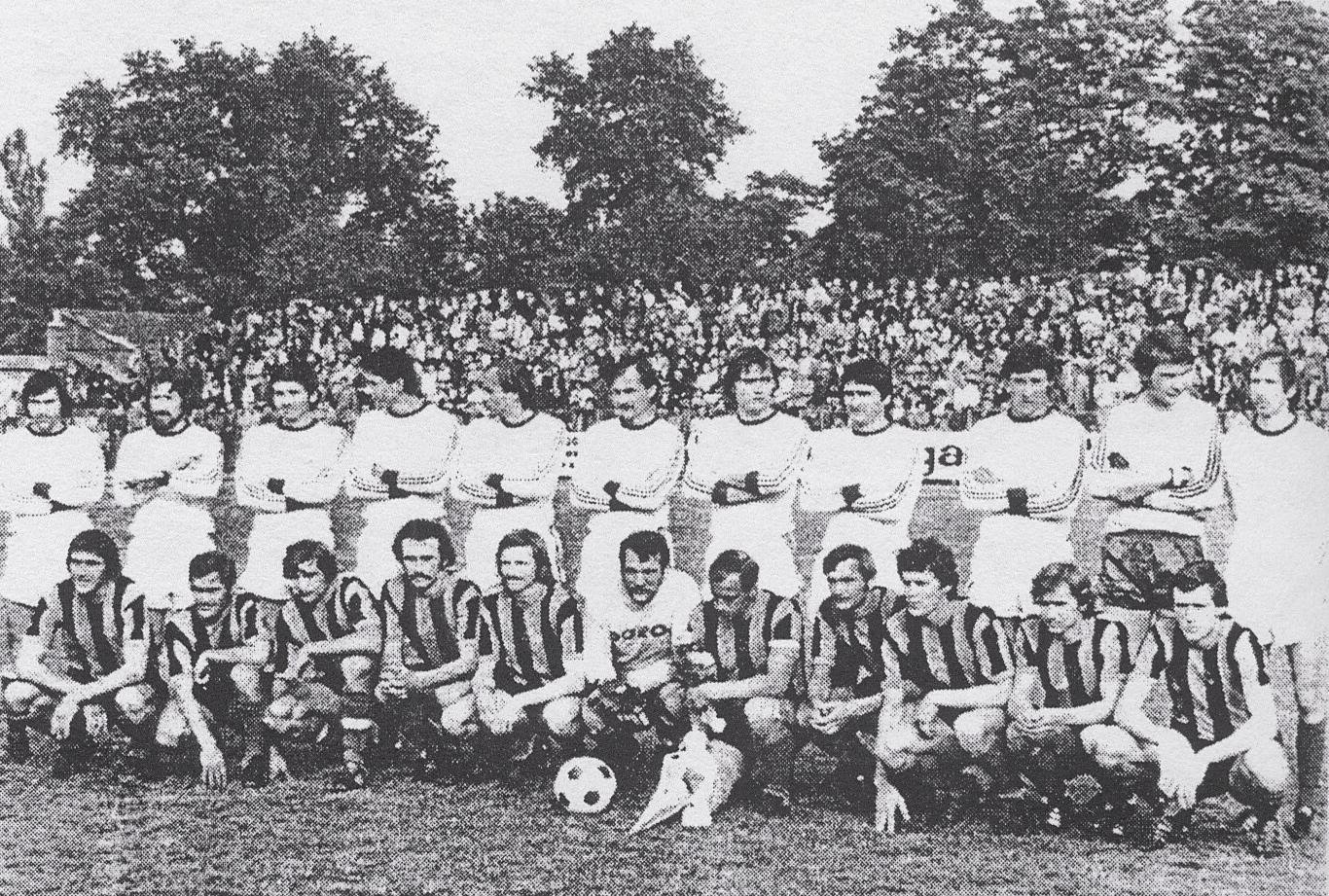
Dorog-Újpest in the Hungarian League (1977)

Újpest won the 1977–78 season of the Hungarian League. As a consequence, Újpest could take part in the European Cup 1978-79 season. On 13 September 1978, Újpest drew with FC Zbrojovka Brno at the Stadion Za Lužánkami in Brno, Czechoslovakia. On 27 September 1978, Újpest lost to FC Zbrojovka Brno 2–0 at the Megyeri úti Stadium.

Újpest won the 1978–79 season of the Hungarian League. As a consequence, Újpest were eligible to enter the European Cup 1979-80 season. On 19 September 1979, Újpest beat Dukla Prague 3–2 at the Megyeri úti Stadium. On 3 October 1979, Dukla Prague beat Újpest 2–0 at the Stadion Letná, in Prague, Czechoslovakia.

== 1980s ==
The general decline of Hungarian football reached the club in the early '80s, and league results worsened, winning only one silver and one bronze medal during the decade. However, the team was more successful in the cups, winning the Hungarian Cup in 1982, 1983 and 1987. Some good results were also reached by Újpest on International level, beating UEFA Cup title-holder IFK Göteborg, German top team 1. FC Köln and Cup Winners' Cup title holder Aberdeen, which also meant reaching the Cup Winners' Cup quarter-final in 1984.

Újpest won the Hungarian Cup in 1982 by beating Videoton 2–0 in the final. As a consequence, Újpest were eligible to enter the UEFA Cup Winners' Cup 1982-83 season. In the first leg of the first round Újpest drew with IFK Göteborg (1–1) in Gothenburg, Sweden, and won the home match by 3–1. In the second round, Újpest lost to Real Madrid C.F. 3–1 at the Santiago Bernabéu Stadium. The return match was also won by the Spanish club by 1–0.

Újpest won the Hungarian Cup in 1983 by beating Budapest Honvéd 3–2 in the final. Therefore, Újpest entered the UEFA Cup Winners' Cup 1983-84 season. In the first leg of the first round on 14 September 1983, Újpest lost 2–0 to AEK Athens F.C. in Athens, Greece. On 28 September 1983, the return match was won by Újpest by 4–1 which resulted their qualification for the second round. In the second round, on 19 October 1983 Újpest beat 1. FC Köln by 3–1 at home. Although Újpest lost the second leg by 4–2 on 2 November 1983, they qualified for the third round on away goals rule. Although Újpest beat the Scottish FC Aberdeen by 2–0 in Budapest in the quarter-finals on 7 March 1984, the second leg was won by Aberdeen 3–0 which resulted the farewell from the UEFA Cup Winners' Cup 1983-84 season for Újpest on 21 March 1984.

Újpest won the Hungarian Cup in 1987 by beating Pécs 3–2 in Székesfehérvár, Fejér County. Therefore, Újpest could enter the UEFA Cup Winners' Cup 1987-88 season. In the first round Újpest beat FC Den Haag by 1–0 in Budapest. The return match was won by the Dutch Cup holder by 3–1 which resulted the exit of Újpest.

Újpest won the 1989–90 season of the Hungarian League. Therefore, Újpest entered the European Cup 1991-92 season. In the first leg of the first round on 19 September 1990, Újpest lost 3–0 to Serie A 1988-89-champions SSC Napoli at the Stadio San Paolo in Naples, Italy. The goals were scored by Baroni and Maradona. The second leg was also won by the Italian champions by 2–0 at the Megyeri úti Stadium on 3 October 1990.

== 1990s ==
After the fall of communism, the club changed their name back to Újpesti TE. The club started the new decade with a championship title in 1989–90, and with cup success in 1992. The team also won the first ever edition of the Hungarian Super Cup in 1992. However, the league results were again poor, with a 14th position and relegation/promotion playoff games bottom in 1993. After securing their first league position, better results started to come. The team, including players György Véber and Zoltán Szlezák, reached the 2nd and 3rd positions in the middle of the decade, and finally won the Hungarian league in 1997–98, after Zoltán Kovács and Miklós Herczeg joined the squad.

On 20 May 1992, Újpest won the 1991–92 season of the Hungarian Cup by beating Vác 1–0 in the final in Békéscsaba, Békés County. Therefore, Újpest could participate in the UEFA Cup Winners' Cup 1992-93. In the first round, Újpest lost to Parma F.C. 1–0 at the Stadio Ennio Tardini in Parma, Italy. The second leg finished with a 1–1 draw at the Megyeri úti stadion in Budapest. Parma F.C. went on to win the UEFA Cup Winners' Cup 1992-93 season.

Újpest won the 1997–98 season. As a consequence, Újpest were eligible to enter the 1998–99 UEFA Champions League qualifying rounds. On 22 July 1998, Újpest lost to F.C. Zimbru Chişinău 1–0 at the Chisinau's Zimbru Stadium in Chișinău, Moldova. The second leg was won by Újpest 3–1 at the Megyeri úti stadion on 29 July 1998. In the second qualifying round, on 12 August 1998, Újpest was beaten by S.K. Sturm Graz 4–0 at the Stadium Graz-Liebenau, Graz, Austria. The second leg was also won by the Austrian club by 3–2 at the Megyeri úti stadion, in Budapest. Újpest were eliminated on 7–2 aggregate.

== 2000s ==
2006/07.

With the fall of the communist government and the termination of state sponsorship there came financial problems as well, just like for all other Hungarian football teams. Professionalism was once again introduced in Hungarian football in 1998, thus the club changed their name again, but this time to the well known Újpest FC. However, hard times reached the club soon, and the key players left Újpest due to the lack of money. The situation became better after 2001, when the Szusza Ferenc Stadion went over a complete renovation, and the club's new owners invested more money in football. In December 2001 Róbert Glázer was appointed as the new coach of the club. Their efforts resulted in a new Cup beating Szombathelyi Haladás in the final with a last-minute goal in and Supercup title in 2002, but the team finished in the middle of the league table for years.

In the qualifying round of the 2002-03 UEFA Cup season Újpest beat KÍ Klaksvík 3–2 on aggregate. In the first round Újpest faced with the French Paris Saint-Germain F.C. and lost to them 4–0 on aggregate.

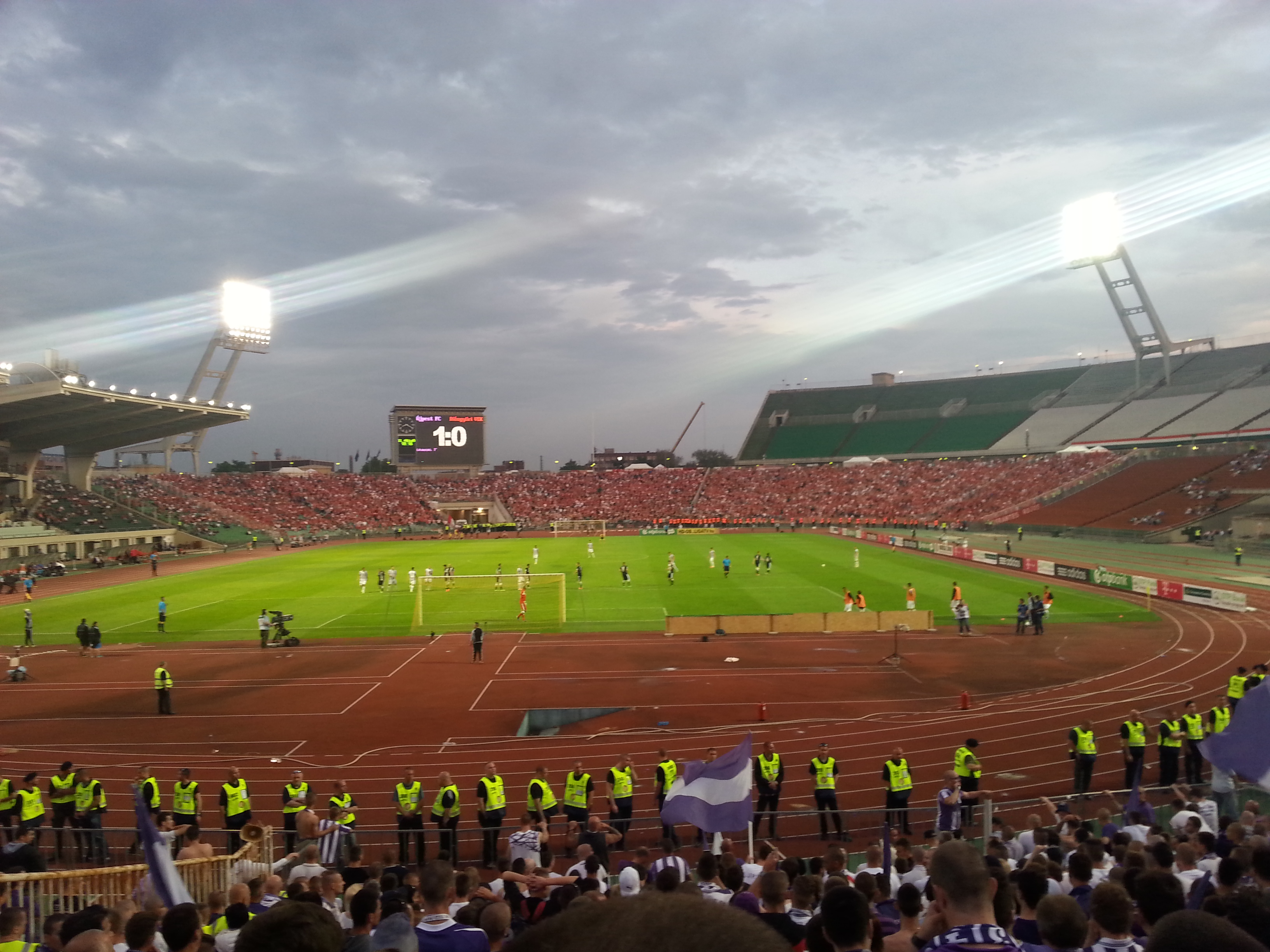
Újpest in the 2014 Magyar Kupa Final against Diósgyőri VTK at the Puskás Ferenc Stadion

With three silver medals won in 2004, 2006 & 2009, Újpest is once again back to the top teams of Hungary. Today the club's financial situation is relatively stable, with one of the largest budgets in the country. They are currently strong contenders in the domestic league, but international appearances are still few and far between.

In August 2006 former Újpest legend Ferenc Szusza died at the age of 82. He is still considered as one of the best players ever of the club. Szusza scored 393 goals in 463 matches. The club named their stadium Szusza Ferenc Stadion in order to honour the feat of their former player.

In 2006 the club appointed the former Hungary and Malaysia national football team coach Bertalan Bicskei as the new manager of the club.

== 2010s ==
In April 2010, Willie McStay resigned from his coaching position after six defeats in a row.

In July 2011, the former Real Madrid and Netherlands coach Leo Beenhakker was appointed as the new sporting director of the club.

On 5 March 2013 Jos Daerden was removed from his position after a 6–0 defeat from Paks in the 2012–13 season of the Hungarian League. Ujpest finished in the 9th position in the 2012–13 Nemzeti Bajnokság I.

In the 2013–14 Nemzeti Bajnokság I Újpest finished 13th. Despite the bad results in the league, Újpest won their 9th Hungarian Cup on 25 May 2014 against DVTK in Budapest. The game remains memorable due to the tense penalty shootout after a 1–1 draw. This success has been achieved after twelve trophyless years in the club's history.

In the 2014–15 Nemzeti Bajnokság I, Újpest finished in the 6th position. In the subsequent year, Újpest finished in the 6th position in the 2015–16 Nemzeti Bajnokság I.

In the 2016–17 Nemzeti Bajnokság I season, Újpest finished in the 7th position. In the 2017–18 Nemzeti Bajnokság I, Újpest finished third. In addition, Újpest won the 2017–18 Magyar Kupa season. In the 2018 Magyar Kupa final, Újpest drew (2-2) with Puskás Akadémia FC. In the penalty shoot-out Újpest won 5-4. Újpest were eligible to enter the 2018–19 UEFA Europa League qualifying phase. In the first qualifying round, Újpest lost to Neftçi PFK 3-1 at the Dalga Arena, Baku, Azerbaijan on 12 July 2018. Despite the 3-1 defeat in Azerbaijan, Újpest won 4-0 at the Szusza Ferenc Stadion and won on 5-3 aggregate. In the second qualifying round, Újpest faced with the Spanish giant club Sevilla FC. On 26 July 2018, Újpest lost 4-0 to Sevilla at the Ramón Sánchez Pizjuán Stadium, Seville, Spain. On 2 August 2018, Újpest lost 3-1 at home and were eliminated from the Europa League. The only Újpest goal was scored by Zsótér in the 77th minute.

In the 2018–19 Nemzeti Bajnokság I, Újpest finished in the 5th position. In the 2019–20 Nemzeti Bajnokság I, Újpest collected 43 points and finished in the 6th position.

== 2020s ==
On 1 June 2020, Nebojša Vignjević was sacked after a defeat against Kisvárda FC at the Várkerti Stadion. He was the longest serving manager in the modern era of the club. He managed the club in 258 matches (107 wins, 75 draws and 76 defeats). He was replaced by Predrag Rogan.

On 8 February 2024, Nebojša Vignjević was replaced by Géza Mészöly. On 29 February 2024, Mészöly was banned for one and half month due to racist comments after the match against Diósgyőr.

On 21 March 2024, the Hungarian oil company, MOL, became the owner of the club after purchasing 100% of the shares from the former owner Roderick Duchâtelet. Balázs Benczédi was elected as the new managing director of the club.

Újpest finished 10th in the 2023–24 Nemzeti Bajnokság I avoiding relegation to the second division. On 27 May 2024, it was announced that Mészöly would leave the club.

On 14 June 2024, former Fehérvár manager Bartosz Grzelak was appointed as the new manager of the club. He debuted with a 2-1 defeat against Puskás Akadémia FC in the first round of the 2024–25 Nemzeti Bajnokság I.

On 17 December 2025, it was announced that former Hungarian national team coach and Hertha BSC manager, Pál Dárdai, is going to take over the role of sports director at the club. On 30 December 2025, Zoltán Szélesi was appointed as the manager of the club, replacing Boldizsár Bodor. On 24 Januar 2026, Szélei debuted with a 1-1 draw against Nyíregyháza Spartacus FC at the Városi Stadion in the 2025–26 Nemzeti Bajnokság I season. After suffering defeats from Puskás Akadémia and arch-rivals Ferencváros, Újpest won their first match with the new management against Debrecen at home on 13 February 2026.

== See also ==
- Újpest FC seasons
- Újpest FC in Europe
- Szusza Ferenc Stadium
- Újpesti TE (men's water polo)
- Újpesti TE (ice hockey)
- Ferencváros TC and Újpest FC rivalry
- Derby of Budapest
