= List of Újpest FC managers =

Újpest Football Club is a professional football club based in Újpest district of Budapest, Hungary.

== Managers ==
As of 3 May 2025.

Manager	Nationality	From	To	P	W	D	L	GF	GA	Win	Honours	Notes
Ferenc Weisz †	Hungary	1920	1922									
Ödön Holits †	Hungary	1922	1924									
György Hlavay †	Hungary	1924	1925									
Ödön Holits †	Hungary	1925	1926									
Imre Pozsonyi †	Hungary	1926	1928									
Lajos Bányai †	Hungary	1928	1932									
István Tóth Potya †	Hungary	1932	1934									
Béla Jánossy †	Hungary	1934	1937									
László Sternberg †	Hungary	1937	1938									
Béla Guttmann †	Hungary	1938	1939									
István Mészáros †	Hungary	1939	1940									
Géza Takács †	Hungary	1940	1943									
Lajos Lutz †	Hungary	1943										
Géza Kertész †	Hungary	1943	1944									
Géza Takács	Hungary	1945										
Pál Jávor	Hungary	1945	1947									
Béla Guttmann † (2nd spell)	Hungary	1947										
Jenő Vincze †	Hungary	1947	1948									
Károly Sós †	Hungary	1948										
István Balogh †	Hungary	1948	1949									
József Ember †	Hungary	1949	1950									
Tibor Kemény †	Hungary											
Zoltán Opata †	Hungary	1950	1951									
Pál Jávor †	Hungary	1951	1954									
Gyula Kolozsvári †	Hungary	1954										
Márton Bukovi †	Hungary	1 July 1955	1 July 1956	25	11	6	8	40	32			
Sándor Balogh †	Hungary	1957	1958									
István Balogh †	Hungary	1958	1959									
Gyula Szűcs †	Hungary	1959	1960									
László Fenyvesi †	Hungary	1960	1961									
Géza Kalocsay †	Hungary	1 July 1961	1 July 1962	34	20	6	8	81	43			
Gyula Szűcs †	Hungary	1962	1963									
Ferenc Szusza †	Hungary	1 January 1964	1 July 1965	40	22	5	13					
Sándor Balogh †	Hungary	1965	1966									
Lajos Baróti †	Hungary	1 July 1967	1 July 1971	139	88	32	19	383	145			
Imre Kovács †	Hungary	1971	1973									
Gyula Szűcs †	Hungary	1973										
Pál Várhidi †	Hungary	1 January 1974	1 July 1980	231	136	55	40	580	332			
Ferenc Szusza †	Hungary	1 July 1980	1 July 1981	36	10	17	9					
Miklós Temesvári †	Hungary	1 July 1981	30 June 1985									
János Göröcs †	Hungary	1985	1988									
István Varga †	Hungary	17 September 1988	31 May 1990									
Ferenc Kovács †	Hungary	1 July 1990	30 June 1992	49	13	15	21	60	71	26.53		
Ferenc Bene †	Hungary	1 July 1992	2 March 1993	19	2	9	8	18	25	10.53		
József Garami †	Hungary	3 March 1993	30 June 1996	107	44	31	32	159	128	41.12		
László Nagy	Hungary	1 July 1996	20 August 1997	41	27	9	5	93	43			
Péter Várhidi	Hungary	9 September 1997	28 July 1999	68	38	12	18	113	75	55.88	1997–98 NBI	
Róbert Glázer	Hungary	29 July 1999	1 February 2000	40	19	10	11	73	59			
Péter Várhidi	Hungary	2 February 2000	30 June 2000	16	4	5	7	16	17	25		
István Kisteleki	Hungary	1 July 2000	12 December 2001	28	13	5	10	55	49			
Róbert Glázer (2nd spell)	Hungary	16 December 2001	13 June 2002	19	9	3	7	36	34			
Ladislav Molnár	Slovakia	1 July 2002	29 August 2002	5	2	1	2	11	10			
András Szabó	Hungary	30 August 2002	27 April 2003	2	0	0	2	0	4	0		
András Sarlós (interim)	Hungary	28 April 2003	4 June 2003	6	3	1	2	8	7			
György Mezey	Hungary	5 June 2003	17 February 2004	16	4	8	4	20	19	25		
Géza Mészöly	Hungary	18 February 2004	30 June 2006	69	42	15	12	152	81	60.87		
Bertalan Bicskei †	Hungary	1 July 2006	13 July 2006	1	0	0	1	0	4	0		
Valère Billen	Belgium	14 July 2006	22 December	18	10	2	6	24	15	55.56		
István Urbányi	Hungary	12 December 2006	22 April 2008	37	20	8	9	66	47	54.05		
Lázár Szentes	Hungary	22 April 2008	28 May 2009	37	18	11	8	73	50	48.65		
Willie McStay	Scotland	1 July 2009	4 April 2010	29	15	2	12	48	36	51.72		
Géza Mészöly	Hungary	4 April 2010	10 August 2011	49	23	10	16	84	64	46.94		
Zoran Spisljak	Serbia England	10 August 2011	11 April 2012	26	11	4	11	49	47	42.31		
Marc Lelièvre (interim)	Belgium	11 April 2012	1 June 2012	8	2	4	2	8	8	25		
Jos Daerden	Belgium	1 July 2012	5 March 2013	19	5	7	7	26	30	26.32		
Marc Lelièvre (interim)	Belgium	5 March 2013	3 June 2013	12	6	1	5	15	14	50		
István Kozma	Hungary	3 June 2013	23 October 2013	11	2	4	5	16	19	18.18		
Nebojša Vignjević	Serbia	23 October 2013	1 June 2020	258	107	75	76	403	306	41.47	2013–14 MK 2017–18 MK	
Predrag Rogan	Serbia	1 June 2020	23 December 2020	25	11	6	8	44	38	44		
Michael Oenning	Germany	23 December 2020	31 December 2021	45	20	7	18	73	80	44.44	2020–21 MK	
Miloš Kruščić	Serbia	13 January 2022	23 March 2023	46	19	9	18	73	74	41.30		
Nebojša Vignjević	Serbia	23 March 2023	8 February 2024	29	11	5	13	40	51	37.93		
Géza Mészöly	Hungary	8 February 2024	30 June 2024	14	4	1	9	19	29	28.57		
Bartosz Grzelak	Sweden Poland	14 June 2024	3 May 2025	34	11	12	11	43	44			
Damir Krznar	Croatia	5 May 2025	10 November 2025	17	4	6	7	25	28			
Boldizsár Bodor (caretaker)	Hungary	21 November 2025	30 December 2025	5	3	0	2	9	10			
Zoltán Szélesi	Hungary	30 December 2025										
