= Róbert Glázer =

Hungarian footballer and manager (born 1950)

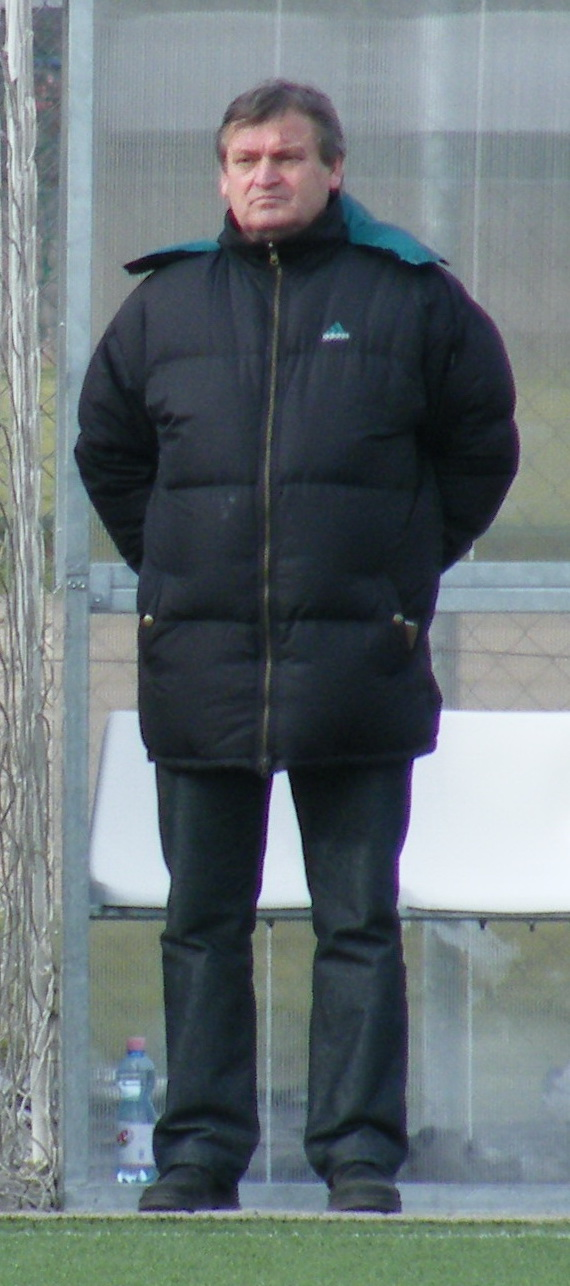
- Glázer in 2009

Personal information
- Date of birth: January 21, 1950 (age 76)
- Place of birth: Győr, Győr–Moson–Sopron, Hungary
- Positions: Forward; midfielder

Youth career
- 1962–1968: Rába ETO

Senior career*
Years	Team	Apps	(Gls)
1969–1982	Rába ETO	296	(65)
1982–1983	Eendracht Aalst		
1982–1983	Tapolcai Bauxitbányász		

Managerial career
- 1985–1986: Ajkai Hungalu
- 1986–1987: Győr-Ménfőcsanak
- 1987–1990: Veszprémi SE
- 1990: Hungary (track coach)
- 1991: Rába ETO
- 1991: Hungary
- 1992–1994: Szombathelyi Haladás
- 1992–1993: Hungary (talent scout)
- 1994: Veszprém
- 1994–1995: Hungary (track coach)
- 1996: EMDSZ-Soproni
- 1996–1997: Jutas-Veszprém
- 1998: Pécsi Mecsek
- 1998–1999: Dunakeszi Máv-Adtranz
- 1999: Újpest
- 2000–2001: Zalaegerszegi TE
- 2001: Veszprém
- 2001: Budapest Honvéd
- 2001–2002: Újpest
- 2002–2003: Szombathelyi Haladás
- 2004: Kecskeméti TE
- 2004–2005: Veszprém
- 2005–2009: Hévíz
- 2010–2011: Vecsési
- 2012: Balatonfüredi
- * Club domestic league appearances and goals

Róbert Glázer (born January 21, 1950) is a Hungarian retired footballer and manager. As a footballer, he played as both a forward and a midfielder throughout his active career, primarily being associated with Rába ETO throughout the 1970s, being the top scorer of the club during the 1974–75 Nemzeti Bajnokság I. As a manager, he briefly managed the Hungary national football team in 1991, overseeing four matches.

== Club career ==
Glázer would begin his career by playing in the youth sector of Rába ETO beginning in 1962 with his main role models growing up being István Korsós, Albert Flóri and Pelé. Within the club, he would oversee the club winning several titles in 1963, 1965, 1966 and 1967 but would play as a reserve beginning in 1965. He would make his debut as a senior member in 1968 in a 3–2 loss against Csepel. Throughout his career with the club, he would often make goals from passes by József Somogyi who he attributes to his great success on field. He would play for the club from 1969 to 1982, nearly becoming champions of the 1973–74 Nemzeti Bajnokság I and be part of the winning squad of the 1978–79 Magyar Kupa, to which Glázer would attribute the club's victory to the club's coaches, Imre Kovács and József Verebes. By the time of his final season of the 1981–82 Nemzeti Bajnokság I where the club would become champions, he would make 296 appearances with 65 goals scored during his tenure, a time he would recall with fondness in a retrospective.

Due to the club winning the 1981–82 season, Glázer was sought out by Belgian club Eendracht Aalst where his contract was initially planned for several years. Despite playing in every position in the club and being elected captain, it was ultimately a knee injury that saw him only play partially in the 1982–83 Belgian Second Division. Following that, he would return to Hungary to play for Tapolcai Bauxitbányász as part of his final season despite being sought after by Szombathely Dobó SE and Zalaegerszegi TE where the club would be promoted for the 1983–84 Nemzeti Bajnokság I.

== Managerial career ==
He would begin his career as a manager shortly after his retirement as a player, first managing Ajkai Hungalu from the 1985 to 1986 season before later transferring to play for Győr-Ménfőcsanak in the following season. His first major career would be with Veszprémi SE, beginning in 1987 until 1990, during which the club would be promoted following their success in the 1987–88 Nemzeti Bajnokság II. After assuming minor roles as a track coach for the Hungary national football team and Rába ETO in 1990 and 1991 respectively, he became a caretaker manager of Hungary for the rest of 1991, directing four matches where they would result in two draws and two losses. Following that, he'd briefly manage Szombathelyi Haladás VSE throughout the 1992–93 Nemzeti Bajnokság II, winning the tournament. Despite initially starting strong in his first season with the club, his second season would produce mediocre results, resulting in him and the rest of the club mutually agreeing to terminate the contract.

During the autumn of 1994, he would manage Veszprém once again, leading the club in 15 matches before returning to Hungary as a track coach under Kálmán Mészöly, with Glázer describing his working relationship as being strong and effective. Throughout the spring of 1996, he would briefly manage EMDSZ-Soproni with poor results and would result in him managing Jutas-Veszprém for the rest of the season and would then briefly manage Pécsi Mecsek in the beginning in 1998. Following disagreements with the club's owners regarding how to set up goals, he would manage Dunakeszi Máv-Adtranz where the club would be champions of the 1998–99 Nemzeti Bajnokság II. He would then manage Újpest in the beginning of 1999 but following the club's position of professional director and Péter Várhidi being appointed in his place where, despite the club being ranked 4th by the time of Glázer's departure, would end up in 10th by the conclusion of the 1999–2000 Nemzeti Bajnokság I.

In the new millennium, Glázer would briefly serve as manager of Zalaegerszegi TE in the 2000–01 Nemzeti Bajnokság I before returning to Veszprém for some matches of 2001. Following this, he would then briefly be manager of Budapest Honvéd for a few matches before later becoming manager of Újpest for the remainder of 2001 until leaving in June 2002. He would then return to coach recently relegated club Szombathelyi Haladás for the 2002–03 Nemzeti Bajnokság II where despite Glázer's best efforts to promote the club back to the top flight, would ultimately yield average results. He would then become manager of Kecskeméti TE at the beginning of the 2004–05 Nemzeti Bajnokság II. Despite this however, he would later return to Veszprém for the final time for the remainder of the season, holding the record for being inaugurated within the club five times and being dismissed six times.

Following this, he would become manager of Hévíz for the following few seasons with his only notable absence being in 2009 due to him attracting a fever. During his tenure with the club, he would lead the club in their victory in the 2008–09 Nemzeti Bajnokság III, ensuring the club's promotion to the second tier of Hungarian football. In 2010, he would become the track coach of Vecsési. After departing from the club in 2011, his final club would be with Balatonfüredi in 2012 before his retirement as a football manager.
