= List of Újpest FC records and statistics =

Újpest Football Club is a professional football club based in Újpest district of Budapest, Hungary.

== Team ==
- Record League victory — 16–0 vs. Nemzeti SC, (22 May 1945)
- Record 2nd League victory — 22–0 vs. Postatakarékpénztár, (20 November 1904)
- Record away victory — 10–0 vs. Salgótarjáni SE, (21 May 1939) and vs. Budai Barátság, (1 April 1946)
- Record League Defeat — 0–9 vs. Törekvés SE, (17 May 1914)

== Player ==
- Most League Appearances — 462, Ferenc Szusza (1941–60)
- Most League Goals scored — 392, Ferenc Szusza
- Most League Goals in a Season — 56, Gyula Zsengellér (1938–39)
- Most Goals scored in a Match — 6
  - Gyula Zsengellér v. Salgótarjáni SE, (11 November 1938)
  - Gyula Zsengellér v. Salgótarjáni SE (21 May 1939)
  - Gyula Zsengellér v. Budafoki FC, (27 May 1939)
  - Lajos Várnai v. Testvériség SE, (22 June 1947)
  - Ferenc Bene v. Haladás, (21 October 1962)
- Most Capped Player — 92, László Fazekas (1968–83)

== Attendance ==
- Record League Attendance (Megyeri úti stadion) — 40,000 vs. Ferencvárosi TC (September 18, 1949)
- Record League Attendance (Népstadion) — 90,000 vs. Budapest Honvéd (September 10, 1956)
- Record League Average Attendance - 27 923 in 1964 season.
- Longest unbeaten Run — 31 (League), (30 July 1945 – 17 June 1946)
- Most League Goals in a season: — 184 (1945–46)
- Most points in a season — 76 (34 games, 1996–97)
