= Roderick Duchâtelet =

Belgian businessman (born 1972)

- Born: 1972 (age 53–54)
- Occupation: Businessman
- Spouse: Anna Duchatelet
- Parent: Roland Duchâtelet

Roderick Duchâtelet (born 1972) is a Belgian businessman, the previous president of Újpest FC. His father, Roland Duchâtelet, is the seventh richest man in Belgium.

== Business activities ==
On 19 October 2011, Roderick purchased the 95% of stakes of the Hungarian association football club Újpest FC. Roderick was the director and stakeholder of Germinal Beerschot until 2010.

== Family ==
Duchâtelet's wife, Anna Duchatelet, His father, Roland Duchâtelet was the stakeholder of Standard de Liège.

== Sale of Újpest FC ==
On 30 January 2022, Duchâtelet and the former Újpest striker and sports director Zoltán Kovács signed a sale and purchase contract for the club's ownership companies, with the change of ownership dependent on payment deadlines being met. Duchâtelet said at the time that he hoped to complete the deal, and the Hungarian sports daily Nemzeti Sport reported that if the sale went through, the club would have exclusively Hungarian owners. Duchâtelet nevertheless remained the club's owner for another two years.

On 6 February 2024, the Hungarian oil and gas company MOL agreed to buy Újpest FC from Duchâtelet, with the parties declining to disclose the purchase price. The news site Telex described MOL as taking on the role of owner, unlike its earlier role as main sponsor of Fehérvár FC, and noted that Duchâtelet and his father Roland Duchâtelet had previously been involved in running Germinal Beerschot, Standard Liège, Sint-Truidense, FC Carl Zeiss Jena, AD Alcorcón and Charlton Athletic, but had since withdrawn from all of them. The Belgian newspaper Het Belang van Limburg reported that both Roderick and Roland Duchâtelet were selling the club.

== Current clubs owned by the Duchâtelet family ==
- (Germany) Carl Zeiss Jena (since 2013)

=== Former clubs ===
- (Belgium) Sint-Truidense V.V. (2002–2017)
- (Belgium) Standard Liège (2011–2015)
- (Spain) AD Alcorcón (2014–2019)
- (England) Charlton Athletic (2014–2020)
- (Hungary) Újpest (2011–2024)
