= 1939 Mitropa Cup =

Tournament details
- Dates: 26 June – 11 September 1939
- Teams: 8

Final positions
- Champions: (Hungary) Újpest (2nd title)
- Runners-up: (Hungary) Ferencváros

Tournament statistics
- Top scorer(s): (Hungary) Gyula Zsengellér (9 goals)

The 1939 season of the Mitropa Cup football club tournament was won by Újpest who defeated fellow Hungarian side Ferencváros 6–3 on aggregate in the final. It was the third consecutive final appearance for Ferencváros and it was Újpest's second and final victory in the competition.

This was the 13th edition of the tournament. Last season's winners Slavia Prague were eliminated in the quarter-finals by Yugoslavian side Beogradski SK.

== Quarterfinals ==
Team 1	Agg.	Team 2	1st leg	2nd leg
Venus București (Romania)	1–5	(Italy) AGC Bologna	1–0	0–5
Ferencváros (Hungary)	4–3	(Protectorate of Bohemia and Moravia) Sparta Prague	2–3	2–0
Beogradski SK (Kingdom of Yugoslavia)	4–2	(Protectorate of Bohemia and Moravia) Slavia Prague	3–0	1–2
Ambrosiana Inter (Italy)	2–4	(Hungary) Újpest	2–1	0–3

== Semifinals ==
Team 1	Agg.	Team 2	1st leg	2nd leg
AGC Bologna (Italy)	4–5	(Hungary) Ferencváros	3–1	1–4
Beogradski SK (Kingdom of Yugoslavia)	5–9	(Hungary) Újpest	4–2	1–7

== Finals ==
Team 1	Agg.	Team 2	1st leg	2nd leg
Újpest (Hungary)	6–3	(Hungary) Ferencváros	4–1	2–2

23 July 1939

Ferencváros (Hungary)	1–4	(Hungary) Újpest
Sárosi 73'		Zsengellér 9', 74'; Kocsis 10', 53'

Üllői úti, Budapest
Attendance: 12,000
Referee: Gustav Krist (Bohemia)

30 July 1939

Újpest (Hungary)	2–2	(Hungary) Ferencváros
Ádám 54'; Balogh 82'		Kiszely 15' (pen.), 29'

Megyeri úti, Budapest
Attendance: 15,000
Referee: Generoso Dattilo (Italy)

== Top goalscorers ==
Rank	Player	Team	Goals
1	(Hungary) Gyula Zsengellér	(Hungary) Újpest	9
2	(Hungary) István Kiszely	(Hungary) Ferencváros	5
3	(Italy) Ettore Puricelli	(Italy) AGC Bologna	4
3	(Hungary) Géza Kocsis	(Hungary) Újpest	4
3	(Hungary) Géza Toldi	(Hungary) Ferencváros	4
