= György Hlavay =

Hungarian footballer (1888–1958)

Personal information
- Date of birth: 4 January 1888
- Place of birth: Budapest, Austria-Hungary
- Date of death: 18 July 1958 (aged 70)

Senior career*
Years	Team	Apps	(Gls)
1904–1909	Budapesti TC		
1909–1913	Nemzeti SC		
1913–1920	MTK Budapest		

International career
1909–1914	Hungary	8	(1)

Managerial career
- 1924–1925: Újpest
- 1925: Udinese
- 1926: Juventus București
- 1928: Bástya
- 1930: Juventus București
- 1930–1931: SPAL
- 1932–1935: Brescia
- 1935–1936: SPAL
- 1938–1939: Ferencváros
- 1945: Nemzeti SC
- * Club domestic league appearances and goals

György Hlavay (4 January 1888 – 18 July 1958) was a Hungarian footballer. He played in eight matches for the Hungary national football team from 1909 to 1914. He was also part of Hungary's squad for the football tournament at the 1912 Summer Olympics, but he did not play in any matches.

== Honours ==
=== Player ===
MTK Budapest

- Nemzeti Bajnokság I: 1913–14, 1916–17, 1917–18, 1918–19, 1919–20
- Magyar Kupa: 1913–14

=== Manager ===
Juventus București

- Divizia A: 1929–30
