= Újpest FC in European football =

Újpest Football Club is a professional football club based in Újpest district of Budapest, Hungary.

== Matches ==
Season	Competition	Round	Club	Home	Away	Aggregate
1958–60	Inter-Cities Fairs Cup	1. Round	(Socialist Federal Republic of Yugoslavia) Zagreb XI	1–0	2–4	3–4
1960–61	European Cup	Preliminary Round	(Serbia) Red Star Belgrade	3–0	2–1	5–1
		1. Round	(Portugal) S.L. Benfica	2–1	2–6	4–7
1960–61	Inter-Cities Fairs Cup	1. Round	(England) Birmingham City	1–2	2–3	3–5
1961–62	UEFA Cup Winners' Cup	Preliminary Round	(Malta) Floriana FC	10–2	5–2	15–4
		1. Round	(Netherlands) Ajax Amsterdam	3–1	1–2	4–3
		Quarter-finals	(Scotland) Dunfermline FC	4–3	1–0	5–3
		Semi-finals	(Italy) ACF Fiorentina	0–1	0–2	0–3
1962–63	UEFA Cup Winners' Cup	Preliminary Round	(Poland) Zagłębie Sosnowiec	5–0	0–0	5–0
		1. Round	(Italy) SSC Napoli	1–1	1–1	2–2 (playoff 1–3)
1963	UEFA Intertoto Cup	Group 2	(France) Stade Français	0–0	1–0	
		Group 2	(Italy) AC Mantova	4–0	4–1	
		Group 2	(Czechoslovakia) CKD Praha	2–2	3–2	
		Quarter-finals	(Czechoslovakia) RH Slovnaft Bratislava	1–0	1–4	2–4
1963–64	Inter-Cities Fairs Cup	1. Round	(East Germany) SC Leipzig	3–2	0–0	3–2
		2. Round	(Bulgaria) PFC Lokomotiv Plovdiv	0–0	3–1	3–1
		Quarter-finals	(Spain) Valencia CF	3–1	2–5	5–6
1965–66	Inter-Cities Fairs Cup	2. Round	(England) Everton FC	3–0	1–2	4–2
		3. Round	(West Germany) 1. FC Köln	4–0	2–3	6–3
		Quarter-finals	(England) Leeds United	1–1	1–4	2–5
1968–69	Inter-Cities Fairs Cup	1. Round	US Luxembourg	x–x	x–x	w/o
		2. Round	(Greece) Aris Thessaloniki F.C.	9–1	2–1	11–2
		3. Round	(Poland) Legia Warszawa	2–2	1–0	3–2
		Quarter-finals	(England) Leeds United	2–0	1–0	3–0
		Semi-finals	(Turkey) Göztepe AS	4–0	4–1	8–1
		Final	(England) Newcastle United	2–3	0–3	2–6
1969–70	Inter-Cities Fairs Cup	1. Round	(Serbia) FK Partizan	2–0	1–2	3–2
		2. Round	(Belgium) Club Brugge	3–0	2–5	5–5 (a)
		3. Round	(East Germany) FC Carl Zeiss Jena	0–3	0–1	0–4
1970–71	European Cup	1. Round	(Serbia) Red Star Belgrade	2–0	0–4	2–4
1971–72	European Cup	1. Round	(Sweden) Malmö FF	4–0	0–1	4–1
		2. Round	(Spain) Valencia CF	2–1	1–0	3–1
		Quarter-finals	(Scotland) Glasgow Celtic	1–2	1–1	2–3
1972–73	European Cup	1. Round	(Switzerland) FC Basel	2–0	2–3	4–3
		2. Round	(Scotland) Glasgow Celtic	3–0	1–2	4–2
		Quarter-finals	(Italy) Juventus FC	2–2	0–0	2–2 (a)
1973–74	European Cup	1. Round	(Republic of Ireland) Waterford United	3–0	3–2	6–2
		2. Round	(Portugal) S.L. Benfica	2–0	1–1	3–1
		Quarter-finals	(Czechoslovakia) FC Spartak Trnava	1–1	1–1	2–2 (p4-3)
		Semi-finals	(Germany) FC Bayern Munich	1–1	0–3	1–4
1974–75	European Cup	1. Round	(Bulgaria) PFC Levski Sofia	4–1	3–0	7–1
		2. Round	(England) Leeds United	1–2	0–3	1–5
1975–76	European Cup	1. Round	(Switzerland) FC Zürich	4–0	1–5	5–5 (a)
		2. Round	(Portugal) S.L. Benfica	3–1	2–5	5–6
1976–77	UEFA Cup	1. Round	(Spain) Athletic Bilbao	1–0	0–5	1–5
1977–78	UEFA Cup	1. Round	(Austria) LASK Linz	7–0	2–3	9–3
		2. Round	(Spain) Athletic Bilbao	2–0	0–3	2–3 (aet)
1978–79	European Cup	1. Round	(Czechoslovakia) 1. FC Brno	0–2	2–2	2–4
1979–80	European Cup	1. Round	(Czechoslovakia) Dukla Prague	3–2	0–2	3–4
1980–81	UEFA Cup	1. Round	(Spain) Real Sociedad	1–1	0–1	1–2
1982–83	UEFA Cup Winners' Cup	1. Round	(Sweden) IFK Göteborg	3–1	1–1	4–2
		2. Round	(Spain) Real Madrid CF	0–1	1–3	1–4
1983–84	UEFA Cup Winners' Cup	1. Round	(Greece) AEK Athens	4–1	0–2	4–3
		2. Round	(West Germany) 1. FC Köln	3–1	2–4	5–5 (a)
		Quarter-finals	(Scotland) Aberdeen F.C.	2–0	0–3	2–3 (aet)
1985	UEFA Intertoto Cup	Group 10	(Norway) Valerenga IF	3–0	0–2	
		Group 10	(Sweden) Hammarby IF	2–1	2–2	
		Group 10	(Austria) SC Eisenstadt	3–0	1–0	
1986	UEFA Intertoto Cup	Group 6	(Denmark) Aarhus GF	1–0	3–2	
		Group 6	(Switzerland) Grasshoppers FC	3–1	1–0	
		Group 6	(Austria) VfB Admira Wacker	2–0	2–3	
1987	UEFA Intertoto Cup	Group 3	(East Germany) FC Erzgebirge Aue	3–3	0–3	
		Group 3	(Bulgaria) PFC Spartak Varna	5–1	0–2	
		Group 3	(Sweden) Halmstads BK	4–2	0–2	
1987–88	UEFA Cup Winners' Cup	1. Round	(Netherlands) FC Den Haag	1–0	1–3	2–3
1988–89	UEFA Cup	1. Round	(Iceland) ÍA Akranes	2–1	0–0	2–1
		2. Round	(France) Girondins Bordeaux	0–1	0–1	0–2
1990–91	European Cup	1. Round	(Italy) SSC Napoli	0–2	0–3	0–5
1992–93	UEFA Cup Winners' Cup	1. Round	(Italy) Parma FC	1–1	0–1	1–2
1995–96	UEFA Cup	Preliminary Round	(Slovakia) FC Košice	2–1	1–0	3–1
		1. Round	(France) RC Strasbourg	0–2	0–3	0–5
1997–98	UEFA Cup	1. Qualifying Round	(Faroe Islands) KÍ Klaksvík	6–0	3–2	9–2
		2. Qualifying Round	(Denmark) AGF Aarhus	0–0	2–3	2–3
1998–99	UEFA Champions League	1. Qualifying Round	(Moldova) FC Zimbru Chisinau	3–1	0–1	3–2
		2. Qualifying Round	(Austria) SK Sturm Graz	2–3	0–4	2–7
1998–99	UEFA Cup	1. Round	(Belgium) Club Brugge	0–5	2–2	2–7
1999–00	UEFA Cup	Qualifying Round	(Serbia) FK Vojvodina	1–1	0–4	1–5
2002–03	UEFA Cup	Qualifying Round	(Faroe Islands) KÍ Klaksvík	1–0	2–2	3–2
		1. Round	(France) Paris Saint-Germain	0–1	0–3	0–4
2004–05	UEFA Cup	2. Qualifying Round	(Switzerland) Servette FC	3–1	2–0	5–1
		1. Round	(Germany) VfB Stuttgart	1–3	0–4	1–7
2006–07	UEFA Cup	1. Qualifying Round	(Liechtenstein) FC Vaduz	0–4	1–0	1–4
2009–10	UEFA Europa League	2. Qualifying Round	(Romania) FC Steaua București	1–2	0–2	1–4
2018–19	UEFA Europa League	1. Qualifying Round	(Azerbaijan) Neftçi Baku	4−0	1−3	5−3
		2. Qualifying Round	(Spain) Sevilla FC	1−3	0−4	1−7
2021–22	UEFA Europa Conference League	2. Qualifying Round	(Liechtenstein) FC Vaduz	2–1	3–1	5–2
		3. Qualifying Round	(Switzerland) FC Basel	1–2	0−4	1−6

== European record ==
As of 30 March 2008:

Competition	Seasons	From	To	Record					
Competition	Seasons	From	To	P	W	D	L	GF	GA
UEFA Champions League	11	1960	1998	44	18	8	18	70	72
UEFA Cup	17	1958	2006	66	27	10	29	106	107
UEFA Cup Winners' Cup	6	1961	1992	27	11	5	11	51	40
	34 seasons			137	56	23	58	227	219

P = matches played, W = won, D = drawn, L = lost, GF = goals for, GA = goals against

In the above table the UEFA Cup row includes 6 appearances in the Inter-Cities Fairs Cup

== Club record ==
As of 3 August 2018

- Biggest win: 27/09/1961, Újpest 10-2 (Malta) Floriana, Budapest
- Biggest defeat: 15/09/1998, Újpest 0-5 (Belgium) Club Brugge, Budapest and 29/09/1976, Athletic Bilbao (Spain) 5-0 Újpest, Bilbao
- Appearances in UEFA Champions League: 11
- Appearances in UEFA Cup Winners' Cup: 6
- Appearances in UEFA Europa League: 13
- Player with most UEFA appearances: 41 (Hungary) Ferenc Bene, (Hungary) Ede Dunai, (Hungary) András Tóth
- Top scorers in UEFA club competitions: 20 (Hungary) Ferenc Bene
