= Miklós Temesvári =

Hungarian football manager (born 1938)

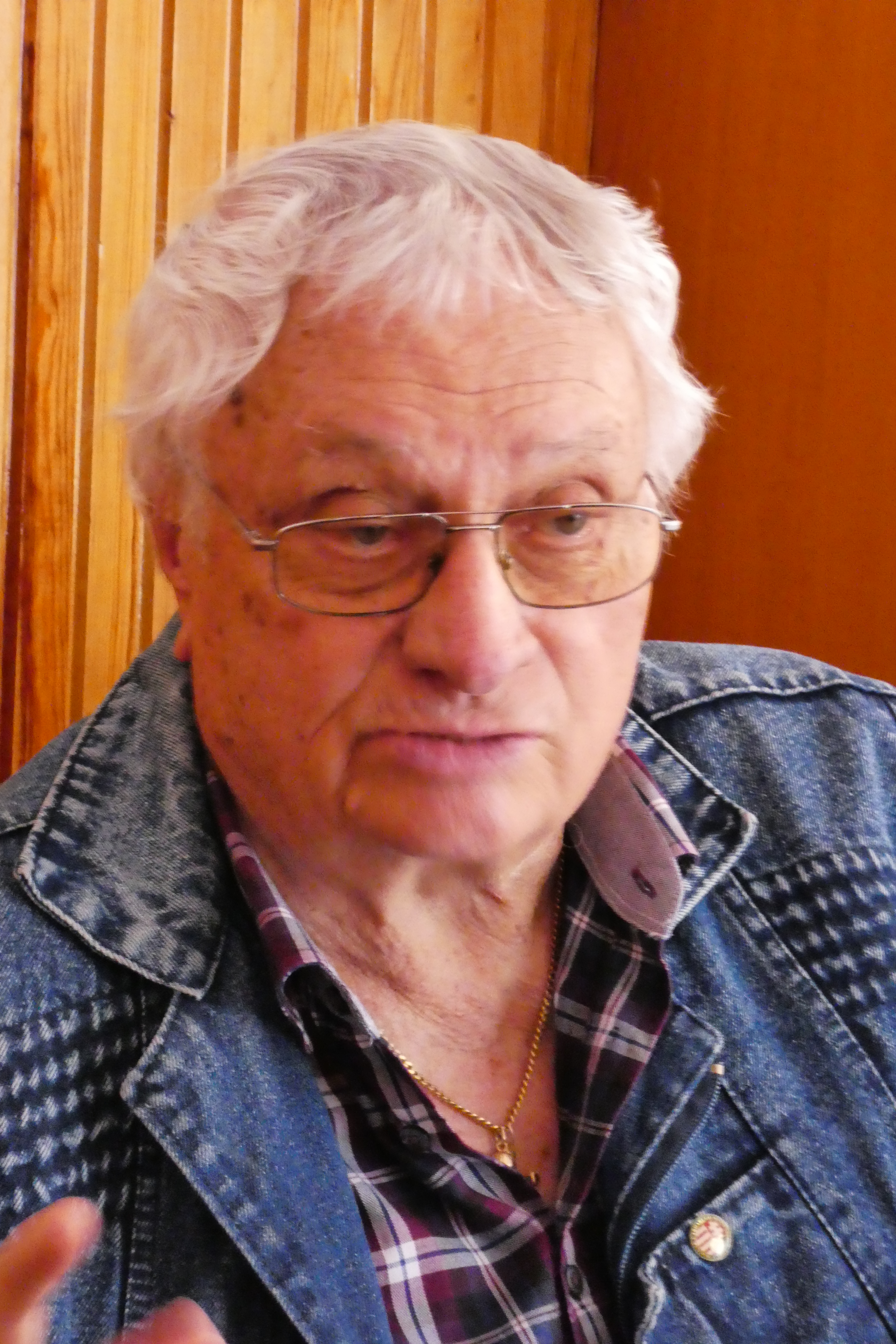

Personal information
- Date of birth: 27 July 1938 (age 88)
- Place of birth: Miskolc, Hungary
- Position: Midfielder

Managerial career
- Years: Team
- 1978–1981: Nyíregyháza
- 1981–1985: Újpest
- 1985–1988: Tatabánya
- 1988–1990: Debrecen
- 1990–1993: Maldives
- 1993–1996: VB Addu
- 1999–2000: Diósgyőr
- 2000–2001: Tirana

Miklós Temesvári (born 27 July 1938) is a Hungarian former professional football manager and player.

== Personal life ==
His son, Miklós Temesvári, is a former professional footballer. His grandson, Attila Temesvári, won promotion to the Hungarian top flight as a player with Nyíregyháza in 2024, echoing Temesvári's earlier achievement as a manager with the same club.
