= Roland Duchâtelet =

Belgian businessman and politician (born 1946)

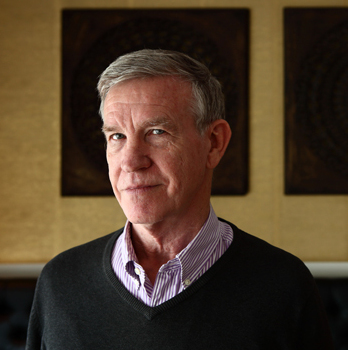

Senator
- In office 28 June 2007 – June 2010

Personal details
- Born: 14 November 1946 (age 79) Merksem, Antwerp, Belgium
- Party: Open VLD
- Education: Katholieke Universiteit Leuven

Roland Duchâtelet (French: [dyʃɑtlɛ]; born 14 November 1946) is a Belgian businessman and politician. He has been the owner of various football clubs. He is the founder of the social-liberal political party Vivant in Belgium.

== Business ==
In 1990, he became involved in micro-electronics. He founded several multinational corporations, of which semi-conductor producer Melexis is the best known. Other corporations include X-Fab, which also produces semi-conductors, Epiq, which produces electronic systems, the online-television channel TVLokaal.com, and the holding company Elex. Through his businesses, Duchâtelet became a multimillionaire.

Duchâtelet used to own a group of football clubs, but remains as the main shareholder of only one presently: Carl Zeiss Jena (Germany, D4). He previously owned Standard Liège which he sold in early 2015, Sint-Truidense, which he sold in 2017, Alcorcón, which he sold in 2019, Charlton Athletic, which he sold in 2020, and Újpest, sold in 2024. He retained ownership of Charlton Athletic's stadium, The Valley, and their training ground, Sparrows Lane.

In March 2016, Duchâtelet made headlines after a statement appeared on the Charlton Athletic website in which some of the club's fans were accused of wanting the club to fail. In the aftermath of this statement, Charlton's newly appointed head of communications resigned from her position. The Championship side was then relegated to League One on 19 April 2016. His ownership was met with widespread protests from Charlton supporters, who formed the Coalition Against Roland Duchâtelet (CARD) and Women Against the Regime (WAR). Similar protests from supporters of Standard Liège resulted in Duchâtelet selling the Belgian side.

== Politics ==
In 1993, Duchâtelet wrote a book NV België, verslag aan de aandeelhouders (Joint stock company Belgium, a report to the shareholders), published in early 1994. In his book, he pleaded for economic and political transparency. He emphasized the necessity of sustainable development in a globalized world economy. He also proposed to lower Belgium's public expenditure by 30%. A new political party BANAAN ("Beter Alternatieven Nastreven Als Apathisch Nietsdoen", or "Better seeking for alternatives than doing nothing in apathy") used this book as its political program. This party was committed to a basic income and a green tax shift. After the 1995 elections, in which BANAAN obtained 1% of the votes, Duchâtelet founded the Vivant party/political movement which then entered in federal, regional and communal elections. In 1999, Vivant obtained 2,1% of the national votes. Duchâtelet is party chair and has been a candidate in several elections.

In the movie La vie politique des Belges (2002) by Jan Bucquoy, Duchâtelet is depicted in Vivant's 1999 election campaign.

In 2004, Vivant entered a political alliance with the Flemish Liberals and Democrats (VLD) and Duchâtelet published his second book De weg naar meer netto binnenlands geluk (The road to more net domestic happiness).

In 2007, his party merged with the VLD, which entered in the next elections as Open VLD. He was elected as a member of the Belgian Senate in 2007.

== Bibliography ==
- R. Duchâtelet, NV België, verslag aan de aandeelhouders (Joint stock company Belgium, a report to the shareholders), 1994
- R. Duchâtelet, De weg naar meer netto binnenlands geluk (The road to more net domestic happiness), 2004

== See also ==
- The Political Life of the Belgians: Tart/Vivant
