= 1986–87 Magyar Kupa =

Tournament details
- Country: Hungary

Final positions
- Champions: Újpesti Dózsa
- Runners-up: Pécs

The 1986–87 Magyar Kupa (English: Hungarian Cup) was the 47th season of Hungary's annual knock-out cup football competition.

== Quarter-finals ==
Games were played on April 1 and April 15, 1987.

Team 1	Agg.	Team 2	1st leg	2nd leg
MTK-VM	5–3	Debreceni MVSC	1–2	4–1
Újpesti Dózsa	5–1	Szombathelyi Haladás	2–1	3–0
Ferencváros	1–2	Vasas	1–1	0–1
Pécs	2–1	Videoton	1–0	1–1

== Semi-finals ==
Games were played on May 27 and June 10, 1987.

Team 1	Agg.	Team 2	1st leg	2nd leg
Vasas	1–2	Újpesti Dózsa	1–0	0–2 (a.e.t.)
Pécs	4–3	MTK-VM	2–2	2–1

== Final ==
17 June 1987
18:00 (UTC+2)

Újpesti Dózsa	3–2	Pécs
Rostás 10'; Kardos 50'; Kollár 70' (o.g.)	Report	Lutz 42', 62'

Sóstói Stadion, Székesfehérvár
Attendance: 3,000
Referee: Lajos Németh (Hungary)

== See also ==
- 1986–87 Nemzeti Bajnokság I
