= Géza Mészöly (footballer) =

Hungarian football manager and player (born 1967)

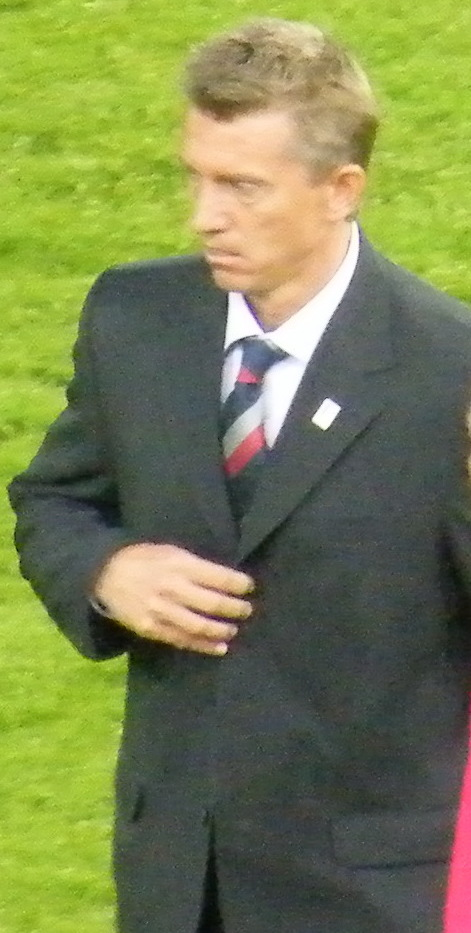

Personal information
- Date of birth: 25 February 1967 (age 59)
- Place of birth: Budapest, Hungary
- Height: 1.89 m (6 ft 2 in)
- Position: Defender

Team information
- Current team: Budafok (coach)

Senior career*
Years	Team	Apps	(Gls)
1984–1990	Vasas		
1990–1991	POSCO Atoms	16	(2)
1991–1993	Vasas	65	(2)
1993–1995	Le Havre	23	(0)
1995–1997	Lille	24	(0)
1997–1998	AEL Limassol	28	(0)
1998–1999	Ironi Ashdod	32	(1)
1999–2001	FC Tatabánya		

International career
1988–1995	Hungary	18	(0)

Managerial career
- 2001–2002: Fóti SE
- 2002–2004: Rákospalota
- 2004–2006: Újpest
- 2006–2009: Vasas
- 2010–2011: Újpest
- 2012–2013: Hungary U18
- 2013–2014: Hungary U19
- 2015–2017: Haladás
- 2018: Győr
- 2020–2022: Fővárosi Vízművek
- 2022–2024: Haladás (sporting director)
- 2022: Haladás (caretaker)
- 2024: Újpest
- 2025: Budafok
- * Club domestic league appearances and goals

Géza Mészöly (born 25 February 1967) is a Hungarian professional football manager and player who last managed Budafok.

== Coaching career ==
As a manager, Mészöly won two silver medals in the Hungarian Championship with Újpest FC in 2004 and 2006.

=== Győr ===
On 22 June 2018, he was appointed the manager of Nemzeti Bajnokság II club, Győri ETO FC.

=== Budafok ===
On 10 November 2025, Nemzeti Bajnokság II club Budafok terminated Mészöly's contract by mutual consent following a string of poor results, culminating in a home defeat against Vasas.

== Personal life ==
His father was Kálmán Mészöly, former football player and coach of the Hungary national team.

== Honours ==
- Manager of the Year in Hungary: 2004
