= Bertalan Bicskei =

Hungarian footballer (1944–2011)

Personal information
- Date of birth: 17 September 1944
- Place of birth: Budapest, Hungary
- Date of death: 16 July 2011 (aged 66)
- Place of death: Budapest, Hungary
- Position: Goalkeeper

Senior career*
| Years | Team | Apps | (Gls) |
| 1962–1964 | Veszprémi Haladás Petőfi | | |
| 1964–1974 | Budapest Honvéd | 240 | (1) |
| 1974–1976 | MTK | | |

International career
| 1973 | Hungary | 1 | (0) |

Managerial career
- 1987–1988: Budapest Honvéd
- 1989: Hungary
- 1991: Daewoo Royals
- 1993–1993: FC Luzern
- 1994: El-Masry
- 1995: MTK
- 1995–1996: Al Raed FC
- 1996–1997: Kispest Honvéd FC
- 1998–2001: Hungary
- 2002: Senjang
- 2003: Videoton FCF
- 2003–2004: El-Masry
- 2004–2005: Malaysia
- 2006: Újpest FC
- 2009: El-Masry
- 2010–2011: Liberia
Medal record
Men's football
Representing Malaysia (as manager)
AFF Championship
| Bronze medal – third place | 2004 |
- * Club domestic league appearances and goals

Bertalan Bicskei (17 September 1944 – 16 July 2011) was a Hungarian football goalkeeper and manager.

== Playing career ==
As a youth player, he played for the Hungarian club Ferencváros, and also for Budapest Honvéd and MTK Budapest, both Premier Division Hungarian sides. As a goalkeeper, he played many games for the Hungary youth national as well as the 13 and Hungary senior national team. After retiring as a player, he devoted time to coaching and teaching young football players at the highest level.

== Managerial career ==
From 1977 to 1982, Bicskei worked as the coaching director for the MTK Budapest's youth programme, and from 1982 to 1986 he was the Youth Coach Director for the Hungary national team. As one of his greatest achievements on that level, under his coaching and guidance, the Under-18 National Team of Hungary, captured the European Youth Championship in Moscow, in 1984.

Before moving on to the senior level, Bicskei successfully completed the work, and graduated at the football academy in Cologne, Germany in 1986. He is one few Hungarian-born coaches who was has earned a coaching degree at this level. While in Germany, he also studied philosophy, and learned to speak German.

In 1987–88 Bicskei become head coach of Honvéd Budapest, (that year, Honvéd won the National title and the Hungarian cup) and his professional career was off to a flying start. In 1989, he, was selected to coach the senior national team of Hungary. In 1991, he could not refuse a challenging offer from South Korea and he became a head coach of Daewoo Royals. Under his direction, the club won the 1991 national title and he was voted Manager of the Year in South Korea. From 1992 to 1994 he coached club FC Luzern in Switzerland. In the 1995–96 he returned home briefly to coach MTK Budapest.

Bicskei packed his suitcase again in 1995, this time to Saudi Arabia where he coached Al Raed FC in the 1995–96 seasons. During his stay in Saudi Arabia, he started working on his book, "Preparation of Young Footballs", a football achievement that not only complements, but also challenges everything that was written thus far on teaching young football players to achieve the highest level. After returning home, he coached Honvéd Budapest once again, 1996–97 seasons, and he was technical director at RABA ETO Győr in the 1998–99 seasons.

Between 1998 and 2001 he served his second stint as the national coach of Hungary, later becoming the technical director of the Hungarian Football Federation between 2006 and mid-2008.

In the second half of 2004, the Football Association of Malaysia selected Bertalan Bicskei, to succeed Allan Harris. Bicskei led the national side to third place at the regional Tiger Cup competition, but was demoted to youth development duties by FAM for his actions during a friendly against Singapore in Penang on 8 June 2005. Bicskei, disgusted by the standard of officiating, threw a bottle onto the pitch before confronting a Singapore player. In September 2005 the contract was terminated after mutual agreement.

Bicskei was given the job of Liberia national team coach in July 2010 on a four-year contract, but had to take a leave of absence in February 2011 after being poisoned in Liberia.

== Death ==
On 16 July 2011, Bicskei died in Budapest after a long battle with illness. He was 67 years old. The death of Bicskei was described as a loss to "a very important part of Hungarian football".
