= Pál Várhidi =

Hungarian football player and manager (1931–2015)

Personal information
- Full name: Pál Várhidi
- Date of birth: 6 November 1931
- Place of birth: Újpest, Hungary
- Date of death: 12 November 2015 (aged 84)
- Place of death: Budapest, Hungary
- Height: 1.79 m (5 ft 10 in)
- Position: Defender

Youth career
- 1942–1946: Újpesti Törekvés SE
- 1946–1949: Wolfner SE

Senior career*
Years	Team	Apps	(Gls)
1949–1965	Újpesti Dózsa		

International career
1954–1957	Hungary	10	(0)

Managerial career
- 1966–1967: Vác
- 1968–1969: BEAC
- 1970–1974: Újpesti Dózsa (reserve team)
- 1974–1980: Újpesti Dózsa
Medal record
Representing Hungary
FIFA World Cup
Runner-up	1954 Switzerland
Olympic Games
Third place	1960 Rome
- * Club domestic league appearances and goals

Pál Várhidi (born Pál Vinkovics; 6 November 1931 – 12 November 2015) was a Hungarian football player and a manager.

== Playing career ==
=== Club ===
He played for Újpesti Dózsa as a defender and helped the club win the Hungarian League in 1959/60. He was born in Újpest.

=== International ===
Between 1954 and 1957 Várhidi played 10 times for Hungary and he represented his country in 1 FIFA World Cup qualification match. The fringe member of the Mighty Magyars also took part in the 1954 World Cup but didn't play any games. He is most famous for his participation in the bronze medal-winning Hungarian team on the 1960 Summer Olympic Games.

== Managerial career ==
After his playing career, Várhidi became a successful coach, leading Újpest to 4 championship titles between 1974 and 1980, and the European Cup semi-final in 1974. As a professional player and first division coach he only played and worked for Újpest. He died in 2015 at the age of 84.

His son, Péter Várhidi was the coach of the Hungary national team from 2006 to 2008.
