= 1929 Mitropa Cup =

Tournament details
- Dates: 22 June – 17 November 1929
- Teams: 8

Final positions
- Champions: (Hungary) Újpest (1st title)
- Runners-up: (Czechoslovakia) Slavia Prague

Tournament statistics
- Matches played: 15
- Goals scored: 60 (4 per match)
- Top scorer: (Hungary) Stefan Auer (10 goals)

The 1929 season of the Mitropa Cup football club tournament was won by Újpest FC in a two-legged final against Slavia Prague. This was the third edition of the tournament, and the first edition in which Italian clubs competed and Yugoslavian clubs did not compete. Clubs from Yugoslavia were barred from the competition after King Alexander declared a royal dictatorship on January 6 of that year, so Italy entered.

== FIGC Qualifications ==
Italy was invited to join, but when the Mitropa began, the Final of the Italian Championship between Torino and Bologna was to play, so the FIGC decided for a playoff between their runners-up Milan and Juventus against two out of the three remaining most successful clubs of the country, Genoa and Inter. The runners-up had the home advantage.

Team 1	Score	Team 2
Juventus	1–0	Ambrosiana
Milan	2–2	Genova 1893

Replay

Played in Genoa

Team 1	Score	Team 2
Genova 1893	1–1	Milan

Genova 1893 was drawn to participate in the Mitropa Cup together with Juventus.

== Quarter-finals ==
Team 1	Agg.	Team 2	1st leg	2nd leg
Újpest (Hungary)	6–3	(Czechoslovakia) Sparta Prague	6–1	0–2
MTK (Hungary)	2–6	(Austria) First Vienna	1–4	1–2
Rapid Wien (Austria)	5–1	(Italy) Genova 1893	5–1	0–0
Juventus (Italy)	1–3	(Czechoslovakia) Slavia Prague	1–0	0–3

== Semi-finals ==
Team 1	Agg.	Team 2	1st leg	2nd leg
First Vienna (Austria)	5–6	(Czechoslovakia) Slavia Prague	3–2	2–4
Újpest (Hungary)	4–4	(Austria) Rapid Wien	2–1	2–3

Playoff between Újpest FC and SK Rapid Wien resulted in 3-1 victory for Újpest FC.

== Finals ==
Team 1	Agg.	Team 2	1st leg	2nd leg
Újpest (Hungary)	7–3	(Czechoslovakia) Slavia Prague	5–1	2–2

3 November 1929

Újpest (Hungary)	5–1	(Czechoslovakia) Slavia Prague
Spitz 42', 69'; Auer 60'; Ströck 67'; Szabó 80'		Puč 44'

Hungária körgyűrű, Budapest
Attendance: 18,000
Referee: Eugen Braun (Austria)

17 November 1929

Slavia Prague (Czechoslovakia)	2–2	(Hungary) Újpest
Junek 28'; Kratochvíl 57' (pen.)		Szabó 84'; Auer 86'

Letná Stadium, Prague
Attendance: 22,000
Referee: Eugen Braun (Austria)

1929 Mitropa Cup Champions

Újpest
1st title

== Top goalscorers ==
Rank	Player	Team	Goals
1	(Hungary) Stefan Auer	(Hungary) Újpest	10
2	(Czechoslovakia) Antonín Puč	(Czechoslovakia) Slavia Prague	5
3	(Czechoslovakia) František Junek	(Czechoslovakia) Slavia Prague	4
3	(Austria) Karl Gerhold	(Austria) First Vienna	4
3	(Austria) Franz Weselik	(Austria) Rapid Wien	4
3	(Hungary) Gábor P. Szabó	(Hungary) Újpest	4
