= Péter Várhidi =

Hungarian footballer (born 1958)

Personal information
- Date of birth: 8 May 1958 (age 68)
- Place of birth: Budapest, Hungary
- Position: Defender

Team information
- Current team: Szigetszentmiklósi TK (Sport Director)

Youth career
- 1968–1979: Újpesti Dózsa

Senior career*
Years	Team	Apps	(Gls)
1979–1980	Újpesti Dózsa		
1980–1986	Ganz-MÁVAG SE		
1986–1992	BVSC Budapest		

Managerial career
- 1995–1996: MTK Hungária FC (assistant coach)
- 1996–1997: Újpest FC (assistant coach)
- 1997–1999: Újpest FC
- 1999–2000: Újpest FC (chairman, manager)
- 2000–2002: FC Fehérvár
- 2003–2004: Nyíregyháza Spartacus (technical manager)
- 2006–2007: Hungary U19
- 2006–2008: Hungary
- 2008: Hungary (Olympic Team)
- 2008: Hungary U21
- 2009: Budapesti EAC
- 2009: Szigetszentmiklósi TK
- 2009–2010: Pécsi Mecsek FC
- 2010–2011: Szigetszentmiklós TK
- 2011–2015: Szigetszentmiklós TK (sporting director)
- 2015–2016: Tatabánya FC (sporting director)
- 2016: Tatabánya FC
- * Club domestic league appearances and goals

Péter Várhidi (born 8 May 1958) is a Hungarian football coach and former player who played as a defender. He served as the head coach of the national team.

== Playing career ==
Várhidi was born in Budapest, Hungary. As a player, he spent most of his career at Újpesti Dózsa as a defender, but never played in the Nemzeti Bajnokság I. Over the age 20 he moved to BVSC, where he played a few 1st division matches.

== Coaching career ==
Várhidi became the head coach of Újpest FC in 1997 and became Hungarian champion with the team in his first season. He worked with the team until 2000. Later he was a coach at FC Fehérvár.

From 2006 to 2008 he was the coach of the Hungary national team and was on 26 November 2009 named as head coach of Pécsi Mecsek FC.

== Personal life ==
His father, Pál Várhidi was also a successful player and coach.

== Honours ==
- Manager of the Year in Hungary: 2007
