= 1974–75 Nemzeti Bajnokság I =

Nemzeti Bajnokság I
- Season: 1974–75

Final standings of the 1974–75 Hungarian League season.

== Final standings ==
Pos	Team	Pld	W	D	L	GF	GA	GD	Pts	Qualification or relegation
1	Újpesti Dózsa (C)	28	20	5	3	71	33	+38	45	Qualification for European Cup first round
2	Budapest Honvéd	28	16	10	2	53	21	+32	42	Qualification for UEFA Cup first round
3	Ferencváros	28	10	13	5	45	29	+16	33	
4	Csepel	28	12	7	9	34	28	+6	31	
5	Videoton	28	9	10	9	35	40	−5	28	
6	Vasas	28	10	7	11	43	46	−3	27	Qualification for UEFA Cup first round
7	Zalaegerszeg	28	11	5	12	32	35	−3	27	
8	Salgótarján	28	10	6	12	33	42	−9	26	
9	Rába ETO Győr	28	10	5	13	40	44	−4	25	
10	MTK-VM	28	9	7	12	33	39	−6	25	Merged with Egyetértés after first half of season; Egyetértés results annulled
11	Diósgyőr	28	7	11	10	26	37	−11	25	
12	Tatabányai Bányász	28	9	5	14	28	40	−12	23	
13	Haladás	28	8	6	14	28	44	−16	22	Qualification for Cup Winners' Cup first round
14	Békéscsaba	28	6	9	13	24	33	−9	21	
15	Pécsi MSC (R)	28	6	8	14	26	40	−14	20	Relegation to Nemzeti Bajnokság II

Source: rsssf.com
(C) Champions; (R) Relegated

== Results ==
Home \ Away	BÉK	CSE	DIÓ	FTC	HAL	HON	MTK	PÉC	GYŐ	SAL	VAS	VID	TAT	ÚJP	ZTE
Békéscsaba		0–0	0–1	1–0	0–0	1–3	3–1	3–3	1–2	0–1	0–0	0–0	2–1	0–2	0–0
Csepel	4–3		1–1	0–0	2–1	1–1	0–0	2–1	1–0	0–0	4–0	3–1	0–1	0–1	2–0
Diósgyőr	0–3	2–1		1–1	6–2	1–1	0–0	0–1	0–0	0–0	3–1	1–1	2–1	0–0	2–0
Ferencváros	0–0	3–1	2–1		1–0	1–1	4–2	1–0	6–1	4–1	4–0	2–3	1–1	2–2	1–1
Haladás	3–2	1–2	3–0	0–1		0–2	0–0	1–2	3–0	0–0	1–1	2–1	1–0	1–2	2–1
Budapest Honvéd	2–0	1–1	5–1	1–1	3–0		3–1	5–1	2–0	3–0	1–0	4–1	2–1	1–1	1–0
MTK-VM	2–0	1–0	4–1	0–0	4–1	0–1		1–1	1–0	2–1	2–0	1–1	1–0	1–3	4–1
Pécsi MSC	1–1	0–2	0–1	1–1	0–2	0–0	3–1		2–1	1–2	2–0	0–1	0–0	4–2	0–0
Rába ETO Győr	1–1	0–1	4–2	2–1	1–0	3–3	2–0	1–0		3–1	1–2	5–0	0–0	3–1	2–2
Salgótarján	2–0	3–1	2–0	0–0	1–1	2–3	1–0	1–0	0–2		0–2	1–2	1–0	1–1	2–0
Vasas	1–2	3–2	2–0	3–3	1–1	1–1	4–2	1–1	1–0	2–4		3–0	3–1	3–0	3–1
Videoton	0–1	0–1	0–0	1–1	1–0	1–1	1–1	1–0	3–2	3–1	3–3		6–1	1–1	1–0
Tatabányai Bányász	1–0	1–0	0–0	2–0	0–1	0–2	2–0	2–1	4–0	3–1	2–1	1–1		0–2	0–3
Újpesti Dózsa	1–0	3–1	2–0	3–1	8–0	1–0	4–1	5–1	5–4	5–3	3–1	2–0	5–2		4–2
Zalaegerszeg	1–0	0–1	0–0	0–3	2–1	1–0	2–0	2–0	1–0	4–1	2–1	2–1	4–1	0–2	

Source: rsssf.com
Legend: Blue = home team win; Yellow = draw; Red = away team win.

== Statistical leaders ==
=== Top goalscorers ===
Rank	Scorer	Club	Goals
1	(Hungary) Ferenc Bene	Újpesti Dózsa	20
1	(Hungary) Mihály Kozma	Budapest Honvéd	20
3	(Hungary) István Gass	Vasas SC	14
4	(Hungary) László Fazekas	Újpesti Dózsa	12
5	(Hungary) László Farkas	Haladás VSE	11
6	(Hungary) Pál Dárdai	Pécsi MSC	10
6	(Hungary) Róbert Glázer	Rába Vasas ETO	10
6	(Hungary) István Weimper	Budapest Honvéd	10
9	(Hungary) László Bálint	Ferencvárosi TC	9
9	(Hungary) Ferenc Szabó	Ferencvárosi TC	9

== Attendances ==
#	Club	Average
1	Ferencváros	19,467
2	Békéscsaba	15,600
3	Újpest	11,821
4	Vasas	11,433
5	Budapest Honvéd	11,429
6	Zalaegerszeg	8,357
7	Haladás	8,333
8	Diósgyör	7,733
9	Fehérvár	6,900
10	Salgótarján	6,464
11	Pécs	6,286
12	Tatabánya Bányász	5,667
13	Győr	5,200
14	Csepel	4,429
15	MTK	4,143
