= Ödön Holits =

Hungarian athlete (1886–1970)

Personal information
- Nationality: Hungarian
- Born: 7 December 1886
- Died: 2 April 1970 (aged 83)

Sport
- Sport: Athletics
- Event: Long jump

Ödön Holits (7 December 1886 – 2 April 1970) was a Hungarian athlete. He competed in the men's long jump at the 1908 Summer Olympics. He also played football, and appeared for the Hungary national team as a goalkeeper. Holits also served as Hungary national football team manager in 1924.
