= Predrag Rogan =

Serbian football manager and player (born 1974)

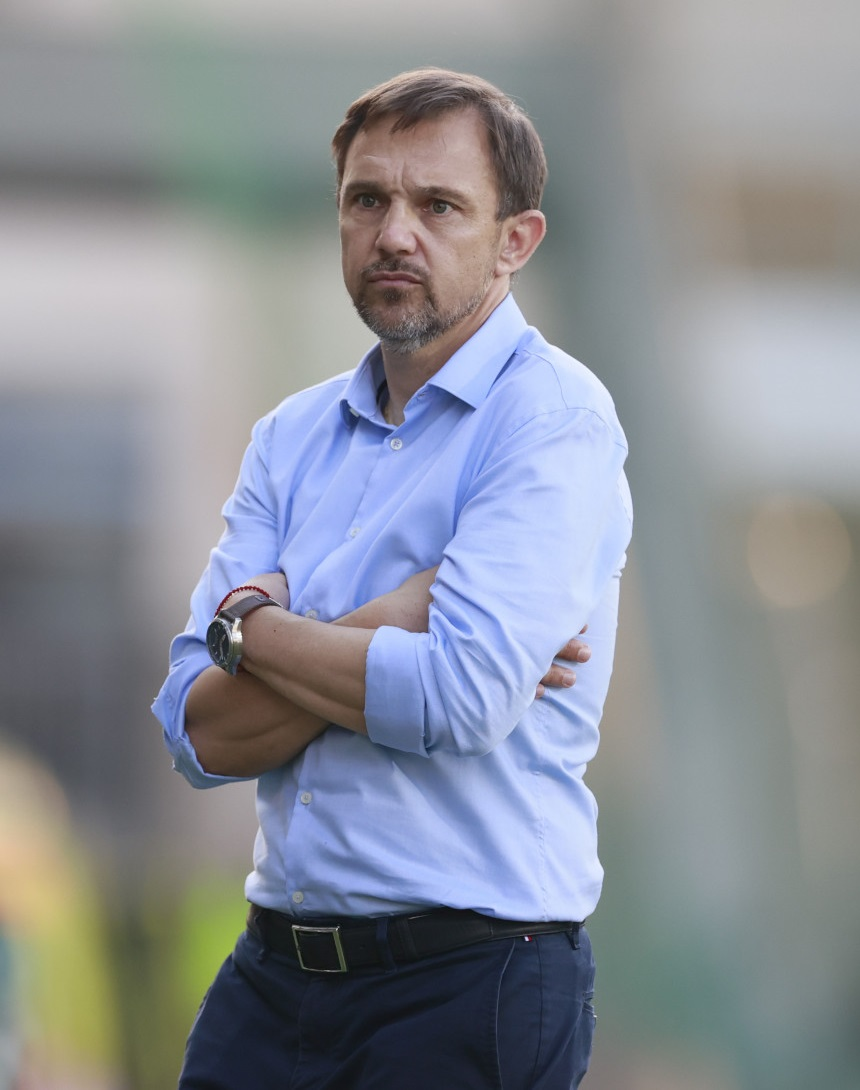
- Rogan managing Újpest in 2020

Personal information
- Date of birth: 2 August 1974 (age 52)
- Place of birth: Loznica, SR Serbia, SFR Yugoslavia
- Position: Midfielder

Youth career
- Partizan

Senior career*
Years	Team	Apps	(Gls)
1995–1997	Loznica	33	(2)

Managerial career
- 2003–2006: Rad (youth)
- 2006–2007: Rad (assistant)
- 2007–2008: Smederevo (assistant)
- 2011: Rad (caretaker)
- 2013: Qadsia (youth)
- 2013–2014: Palić
- 2014–2015: Zemun
- 2015–2017: Mačva Šabac
- 2017–2018: Újpest (assistant)
- 2018: TSC
- 2018–2019: Spartak Subotica
- 2019: Napredak Kruševac
- 2020: Újpest
- 2021: Voždovac
- 2021–2022: Dinamo Samarqand
- 2023: Železničar Pančevo
- * Club domestic league appearances and goals

Predrag Rogan (Serbian Cyrillic: Предраг Роган; born 2 August 1974) is a Serbian football manager and former player.

== Playing career ==
After coming through the youth system of Partizan, Rogan played for Loznica in the First League of FR Yugoslavia between 1995 and 1997.

== Managerial career ==
In July 2015, Rogan took charge of Serbian League West side Mačva Šabac. He led them to promotion to the Serbian First League in the 2015–16 season. In January 2017, it was reported that Rogan parted ways with the club. He moved to Hungary the same month and joined Nebojša Vignjević as his assistant at Újpest. In January 2018, Rogan terminated his contract with the club by mutual consent. He subsequently returned to Serbia and became manager of Serbian First League side TSC.

In October 2018, Rogan was appointed manager of Serbian SuperLiga club Spartak Subotica. He left the position by mutual agreement in June 2019. The same month, Rogan took over at fellow SuperLiga side Napredak Kruševac.

In June 2020, Rogan returned to Újpest as manager, replacing Nebojša Vignjević. He left the club in December of the same year.
