= Sándor Balogh =

Hungarian footballer and coach

Personal information
- Full name: Sándor Balogh
- Date of birth: 18 March 1920
- Place of birth: Gyón, Hungary
- Date of death: 6 February 2000 (aged 79)
- Place of death: Budapest, Hungary
- Height: 1.78 m (5 ft 10 in)
- Position: Defender

Youth career
- 1933–1938: Erzsébeti Spartacus MTK

Senior career*
| Years | Team | Apps | (Gls) |
| 1936–40 | Erzsébeti Spartacus MTK | | |
| 1940–53 | Újpest FC | 337 | (16) |

International career
| 1942–50 | Hungary | 24 | (0) |
- * Club domestic league appearances and goals

Sándor Balogh, also known as Balogh II (Gyón, 18 March 1920 – Budapest, 6 February 2000) was a Hungarian football defender, who played for Újpest FC, as well as for the Hungary national football team, winning 24 caps between 1942 and 1950. He was a member of the Hungarian Mighty Magyars. Balogh later went on to coach Újpest FC, Tatabányai Bányász, Miskolci VSC and Pécsi Dózsa.

== Honours ==
=== Club ===
- Újpest FC
  - Hungarian League: 1945 Spring, 1945–46, 1946–47

=== International ===
- Hungary
  - Balkan Cup Champions: 1947

=== Individual ===
- Hungarian Football Federation Player of the Year: 1945
