= 1973–74 Nemzeti Bajnokság I =

Nemzeti Bajnokság I
- Season: 1973–74

Final standings of the 1973–74 Hungarian League season.

== Final standings ==
Pos	Team	Pld	W	D	L	GF	GA	GD	Pts	Qualification or relegation
1	Újpesti Dózsa (C)	30	18	6	6	75	33	+42	42	Qualification for European Cup first round
2	Ferencváros	30	15	9	6	54	29	+25	39	Qualification for Cup Winners' Cup first round
3	Rába ETO Győr	30	15	8	7	43	35	+8	38	Qualification for UEFA Cup first round
4	Videoton	30	15	7	8	39	31	+8	37	Qualification for UEFA Cup first round
5	Tatabányai Bányász	30	14	9	7	40	37	+3	37	
6	Budapest Honvéd	30	14	6	10	54	36	+18	34	
7	Pécsi MSC	30	12	10	8	29	26	+3	34	
8	Vasas	30	9	14	7	35	31	+4	32	
9	Salgótarján	30	10	12	8	25	28	−3	32	
10	MTK Budapest	30	11	6	13	44	41	+3	28	
11	Csepel	30	10	7	13	35	43	−8	27	
12	Zalaegerszeg	30	10	4	16	28	44	−16	24	
13	Haladás	30	8	7	15	31	47	−16	23	
14	Egyetértés VM	30	4	15	11	25	48	−23	23	
15	SZEOL (R)	30	5	10	15	28	45	−17	20	Relegation to Nemzeti Bajnokság II
16	Dorogi AC (R)	30	2	6	22	23	54	−31	10	Relegation to Nemzeti Bajnokság II

Source: rsssf.com
(C) Champions; (R) Relegated

== Results ==
Home \ Away	CSE	DOR	EGY	FTC	HAL	HON	MTK	PÉC	GYŐ	SAL	SZE	TAT	VAS	VID	ÚJP	ZTE
Csepel		1–1	4–2	1–2	0–1	2–0	3–2	1–1	1–1	0–0	2–0	0–1	2–0	2–1	0–7	3–1
Dorogi AC	1–2		1–1	1–0	0–1	0–1	2–4	1–1	1–3	0–0	3–0	1–1	1–3	0–2	0–3	1–2
Egyetértés VM	0–0	2–0		1–1	0–0	0–2	1–1	0–0	1–2	0–0	1–1	0–0	1–1	2–0	1–1	2–1
Ferencváros	4–1	2–0	5–1		6–1	2–1	2–0	0–0	1–2	2–2	1–2	5–0	2–1	1–1	2–1	3–0
Haladás	1–2	3–0	5–1	1–1		0–5	2–1	1–1	1–1	0–1	2–0	1–1	1–3	1–2	0–3	2–0
Budapest Honvéd	1–2	2–0	3–0	2–2	2–0		1–1	3–0	1–2	2–1	4–1	3–1	1–0	1–2	3–1	4–0
MTK Budapest	1–0	2–0	3–0	1–2	0–2	2–0		0–2	2–0	1–1	2–1	1–1	3–1	3–0	0–2	0–0
Pécsi MSC	3–2	2–1	2–0	0–1	1–0	2–0	3–1		2–0	1–0	1–0	1–0	0–0	0–1	0–0	3–1
Rába ETO Győr	1–1	2–1	1–1	1–1	4–1	2–2	3–1	2–0		2–1	1–0	2–1	1–0	2–0	1–1	2–1
Salgótarján	1–1	1–0	0–0	1–2	1–0	0–3	0–2	1–1	3–1		1–0	1–0	0–0	2–0	2–1	1–0
SZEOL	3–0	0–0	1–3	0–0	0–0	2–2	1–6	4–0	0–1	1–1		1–1	1–1	3–1	0–1	2–0
Tatabányai Bányász	1–0	3–2	2–1	2–0	4–1	1–1	1–0	2–1	3–2	1–1	2–1		3–0	2–2	1–0	2–1
Vasas	2–1	3–2	1–1	1–0	1–1	3–1	1–1	2–0	1–1	0–1	1–1	0–0		0–0	4–2	1–1
Videoton	1–0	1–0	3–0	2–3	1–0	3–1	2–1	1–1	3–0	0–0	1–1	3–1	0–0		3–2	1–0
Újpesti Dózsa	2–1	5–3	6–1	1–1	3–2	4–2	4–1	0–0	2–0	5–0	4–0	4–0	2–2	1–0		4–1
Zalaegerszeg	1–0	1–0	1–1	1–0	2–0	0–0	3–1	1–0	1–0	2–1	2–1	1–2	0–2	1–2	2–3	

Source: rsssf.com
Legend: Blue = home team win; Yellow = draw; Red = away team win.

== Statistical leaders ==
=== Top goalscorers ===
Rank	Scorer	Club	Goals
1	(Hungary) Mihály Kozma	Budapest Honvéd	27
2	(Hungary) Mihály Kőműves	Tatabányai Bányász	15
3	(Hungary) Ferenc Bene	Újpesti Dózsa	14
3	(Hungary) Lajos Koritár	MTK Budapest	14
5	(Hungary) László Branikovits	Ferencvárosi TC	12
5	(Hungary) László Fazekas	Újpesti Dózsa	12
5	(Hungary) András Tóth	Újpesti Dózsa	12
5	(Hungary) Béla Várady	Vasas SC	12
9	(Hungary) Ferenc Király	Haladás VSE	11
9	(Hungary) István Kovács	Salgótarjáni BTC	11
9	(Hungary) János Stolcz	Rába Vasas ETO	11

== Attendances ==
#	Club	Average
1	Ferencváros	19,468
2	Újpest	12,000
3	Zalaegerszeg	10,800
4	Haladás	10,462
5	Fehérvár	8,333
6	Pécs	8,133
7	Győr	7,833
8	SZEOL	7,300
9	Tatabánya Bányász	7,067
10	Vasas	6,867
11	Salgótarján	6,733
12	Dorog	6,200
13	Budapest Honvéd	6,133
14	MTK	4,967
15	Csepel	4,500
16	Egyetértés	4,113
