= István Balogh (footballer) =

Hungarian footballer (1912–1992)

Personal information
- Date of birth: 21 September 1912
- Place of birth: Budapest, Hungary
- Date of death: 27 October 1992 (aged 80)
- Place of death: Budapest, Hungary
- Position: Midfielder

Senior career*
Years	Team	Apps	(Gls)
- Újpest

International career
1938	Hungary	13	(0)

Managerial career
- 1948–1949: Újpest
- 1958–1959: Újpest
Medal record
Men's football
Representing Hungary
FIFA World Cup
Runner-up	1938 France
- * Club domestic league appearances and goals

István Balogh (21 September 1912 – 27 October 1992) was a Hungarian footballer who played as a midfielder for Újpest FC, as well as on the Hungary national team at the 1938 FIFA World Cup.

While Hungary got to the final of the tournament Balogh featured in their opening game, a 6–0 win against the Dutch East Indies. He went on to coach Újpest FC from 1948 to 1949 and again from 1958 to 1959.
