= Újpest FC =

Hungarian football club

Újpest
- Full name: Újpest Football Club
- Nicknames: Újpest, Lilák
- Short name: UTE
- Founded: 16 June 1885; 141 years ago as Újpesti Torna Egylet
- Ground: Szusza Ferenc stadion, Budapest
- Capacity: 12,670
- Owner: MOL
- Chairman: Balázs Benczédi
- Manager: Zoltán Szélesi
- League: NB I
- 2025–26: NB I, 7th of 12
- Website: ujpestfc.hu
Home colours	Away colours	Third colours

Chart showing Újpest's finishing positions since the first ever Hungarian league season of 1901

Újpest Football Club (Hungarian pronunciation: [ˈuːjpɛʃt]), also known by its old name Újpesti Dózsa, is a Hungarian professional football club based in Budapest, that competes in Nemzeti Bajnokság I.

Formed in 1885, Újpest reached the first division of the Hungarian League in 1905 and has been relegated only once since then. The club has been a member of the first division for 108 consecutive years. Újpest have been Hungarian champions twenty times, in addition to winning the Magyar Kupa eleven times and the Szuperkupa three times. In international competitions, Újpest are two-times winners of the Mitropa Cup and winners of the 1930 Coupe des Nations. They also reached the semi-finals of the European Cup 1973–74 and the UEFA Cup Winners' Cup 1961–62, and were runners-up in the Inter-Cities Fairs Cup 1968–69.

Since 1922, their home ground has been the Szusza Ferenc Stadion in Újpest. Their biggest rivalry is with fellow Budapest-based club Ferencváros, with whom they contest a local derby.

Újpest is part of the Újpesti TE family. The club includes other sports sections that represent the club at ice hockey and waterpolo.

== History ==
Újpest was founded in 1885. At that time, Újpest did not belong to Budapest. Újpest played their first Nemzeti Bajnokság I match in the 1905 Nemzeti Bajnokság I season. In the 1910–11 season, they were relegated. Újpest won their first Hungarian league title in the 1929–30 season.

At international level, Újpest's most successful period was in the late 1960s and early 1970s. In the 1968–69 Inter-Cities Fairs Cup, they were beaten in the final by Newcastle United. In the 1973–74 European Cup, they reached the semi-finals and were eliminated by Bayern Munich.

== Crest and colours ==
On 3 July 2017, Újpest announced that they changed their crest. After a years of protests by supporters, and legal actions by UTE, the parent club, the management has decided to restore the traditional crest on 4 July 2022.

=== Naming history ===
- 1885: Újpesti TE (Újpesti Torna Egylet)
- 1926: Újpest FC (Újpest Football Club) (due to the introduction of professional football)
- 1945: Újpesti TE
- 1950: Bp. Dózsa SE (Budapesti Dózsa Sport Egyesület)
- 1956: Újpesti TE (during the Hungarian revolution)
- 1957: Ú. Dózsa SC (Újpesti Dózsa Sport Club)
- 1991: Újpesti TE
- 1998: Újpest FC

=== Manufacturers and shirt sponsors ===
The following table shows in detail Újpest FC kit manufacturers and shirt sponsors by year:

Period	Kit manufacturer	Shirt sponsor
	adidas	–
	adidas	Budapest Bank
	Umbro	ConCorde telecom
	Umbro	Havasi Kft.
2003–2006	Puma	Walton
2006–2007	Puma	–
2007–2009	Puma	DHL
2009–2010	Puma	Radisson Blu
2010–2011	Puma	Birdland Golf & SPA Resort
2011–2012	Puma	GDF Suez
2012–2016	Puma	–
2016–2017	Joma	–
2017–2018	Joma	Gallica

Current sponsorships: Joma, Coca-Cola, Microsoft, Acquaworld Budapest, Ramada Resort Budapest, Puebla ticket, Karzol Trans, Szókép Nyomdaipari Kft., Lamborghini

== Stadium ==
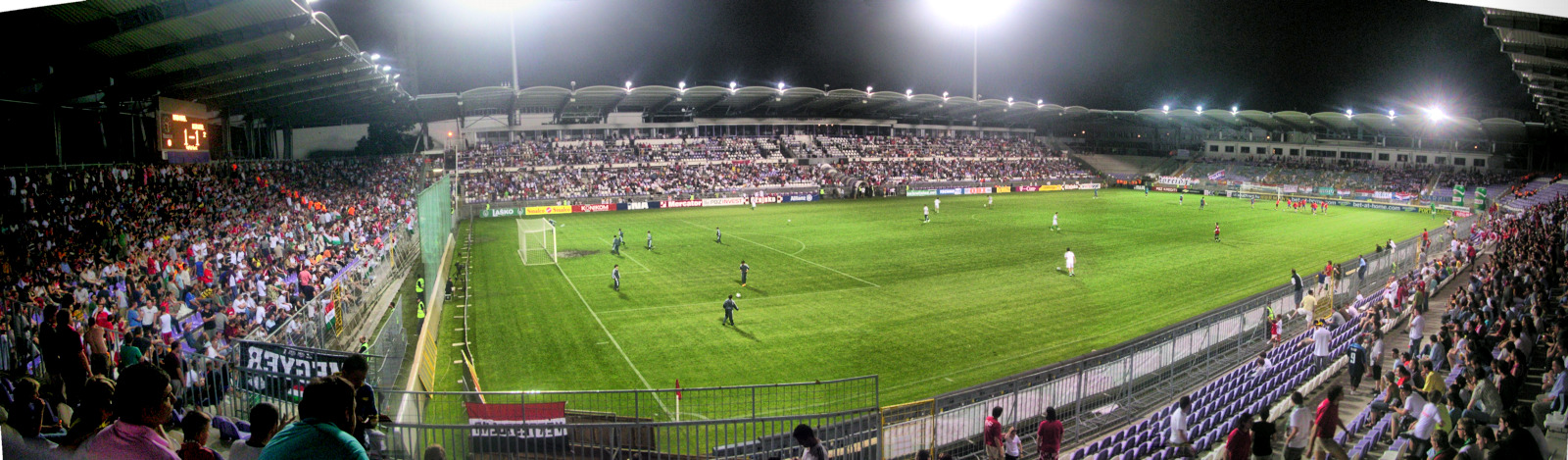
Szusza Ferenc Stadion panorama

Újpest's home stadium is Szusza Ferenc Stadion, which has been their home since the opening on 17 September 1922. It was known as Megyeri úti stadium until it was named after the club's legendary player, Ferenc Szusza in October 2003. After the renovations, which took place in 2000 and 2001, the ground can hold 13,501 spectators.

== Ownership ==
On 3 December 2008, it was revealed by BBC Sport that the Premier League club Wolverhampton Wanderers were considering an alliance with Újpest. Jez Moxey, the Chief executive officer of the club said: "We have had some initial discussions in Budapest with the officials of Ujpest. We touched on the issues of loaning players, academies and sharing of best practice on and off the field."

Újpest approached Roland Duchâtelet to become the owner of the club. Although Duchâtelet refused the club's offer, he suggested his son to be the proprietor of Újpest. Roland Duchâtelet is the owner of the Carl Zeiss Jena and former owner of the Standard Liège, AD Alcorcón and Charlton Athletic

On 19 October 2011, Roderick Duchâtelet, former director of Germinal Beerschot, bought 95% of the shares of the City Budapest Zrt.

Roderick Duchâtelet said that he intends to bring back the glory of the 1970s.

On 27 October 2011, Csaba Bartha, managing director of Újpest, confirmed that the club received 150 million Hungarian forint from Roderick Duchâtelet.

In January 2022, Duchatelet was about to sell Újpest and found possible buyers. An agreement was also signed in January 2022 in which it was stated that the buyers should pay the remaining sum by the end of June. However, due to the financial unpredictability caused by the Russo-Ukrainian War, the buyers could not transfer the remaining sum. Therefore, Újpest is still owned by the Belgian entrepreneur.

On 27 April 2023, it was announced on Nemzeti Sport that Interactive Brokers Group, owned by Thomas Peterffy, is interested in purchasing the club.

On 3 February 2024, it was revealed that Duchatelet would like to sell the club to Hungarian investors. On 6 February 2024, Duchâtelet sold the club to MOL.

On 21 March 2024, the club was officially purchased by the MOL Group. Balázs Benczédi was elected as the managing director of the club. The price of the acquisition was around 15 million euros.

== Supporters ==
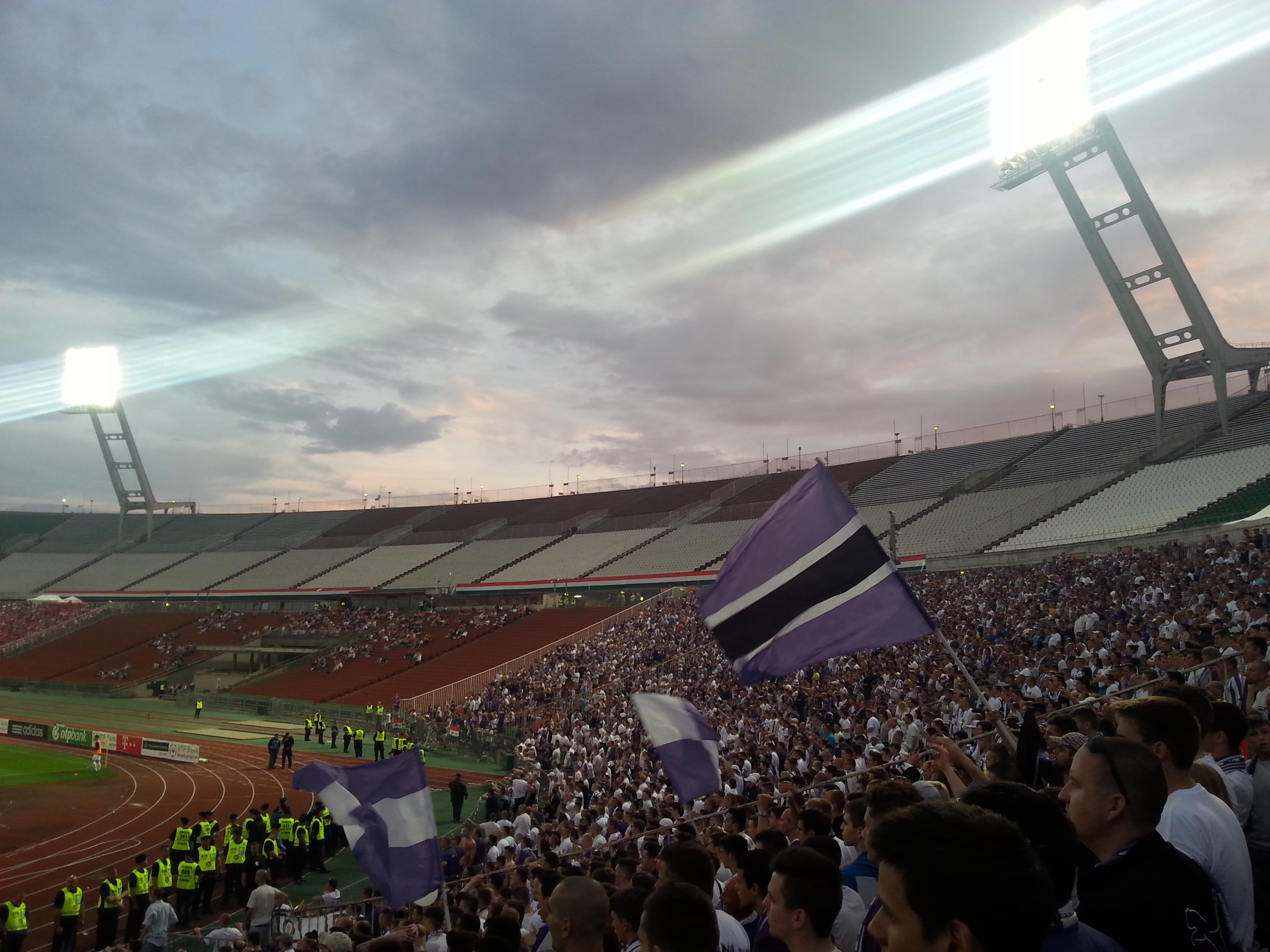
Újpest supporters in the Ferenc Puskás Stadium on 25 May 2014

Supporters of Újpest are mainly from the fourth district of Budapest, the eponymous Újpest. Due to their success in the 1970s, the club gained supporters from all over Budapest and the country.

Famous supporters

- (Hungary) Zoltán Zana (Ganxta Zolee) (rapper, actor)
- (Hungary) Henrik Havas (journalist, television personality)
- (Hungary) György Gyula Zagyva (politician)
- (Hungary) András Stohl (actor, television personality)
- (Hungary) Zsolt Wintermantel (politician & former mayor of Újpest)
- (Hungary) Attila Széki (Curtis) (rapper, former footballer)
- (Hungary) Péter Majoros (Majka) (rapper, television personality)

== Rivalries ==
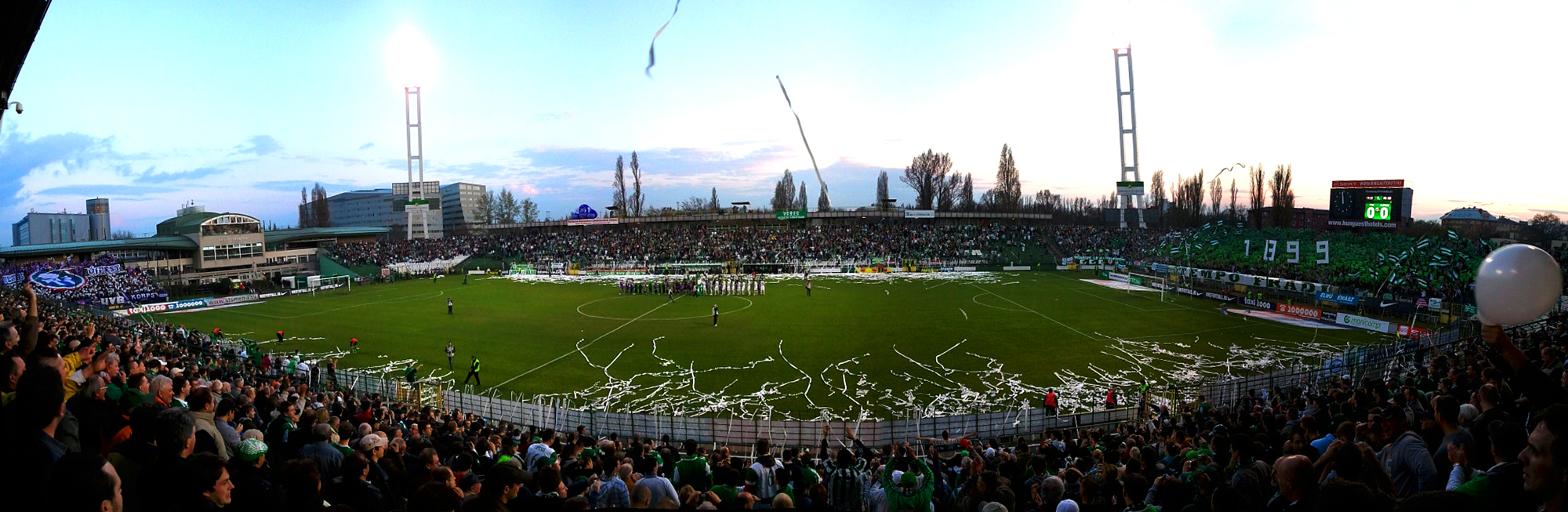
Ferencváros-Újpest derby at the Albert Stadion on 1 April 2011

Újpest are in rivalry with several teams from Budapest including Ferencváros, MTK Budapest, Budapest Honvéd and several provincial clubs such as Debrecen and Diósgyőr. Since Újpest have been the third most successful club of the Hungarian Football history by winning 20 Hungarian League titles and nine Hungarian Cup titles, and the most successful Hungarian club in the European football competitions in the 1970s, every club in the Hungarian League wants to defeat them.

The rivalry with Ferencváros dates back to the 1930s when Újpest won their first Hungarian League title. Since then the fixture between the two teams attracts the most spectators in the domestic league. The matches between the two teams often ends in violence which can cause big trouble for the HFF and Hungarian football in general. The proposal of personal registration was refused by both clubs.

== Honours ==
=== Domestic ===
- Nemzeti Bajnokság I:
  - Winners (20): 1929–30, 1930–31, 1932–33, 1934–35, 1938–39, 1945 Spring, 1945–46, 1946–47, 1959–60, 1969, 1970 Spring, 1970–71, 1971–72, 1972–73, 1973–74, 1974–75, 1977–78, 1978–79, 1989–90, 1997–98
- Nemzeti Bajnokság II:
  - Winners (2): 1904, 1911–12
- Magyar Kupa:
  - Winners (11): 1969, 1970, 1974–75, 1981–82, 1982–83, 1986–87, 1991–92, 2001–02, 2013–14, 2017–18, 2020–21
- Szuperkupa:
  - Winners (3): 1992, 2002, 2014

=== International ===
- Mitropa Cup:
  - Winners (2): 1929, 1939
  - Runners-up (1): 1966–67
- Coupe des Nations 1930 (Predecessor of Champions League):
  - Winners (1): v Slavia Praha 3–0
- Inter-Cities Fairs Cup:
  - Runners-up (1): 1968–69 v Newcastle United 0–3 and 2–3
- European Cup (Champions League):
  - Semi-finalists (1): 1973–74 v Bayern Munich 1–1 and 0–3
- UEFA Cup Winners' Cup:
  - Semi-finalists (1): 1961–62 v AC Fiorentina 0–1 and 0–2

=== Friendly ===
- Joan Gamper Trophy:
  - Winners (1): 1970
- Trofeo Colombino:
  - Winners (1): 1971

== First team squad ==
As of 25 August 2026

Note: Flags indicate national team as defined under FIFA eligibility rules; some limited exceptions apply. Players may hold more than one non-FIFA nationality.

No.	Pos.	Nation	Player
1	GK	HUN	Péter Szappanos
2	DF	HUN	Gergő Bodnár
3	DF	BRA	Heitor (on loan from Maccabi Tel Aviv)
4	DF	HUN	Csanád Fehér
5	DF	HUN	Attila Fiola
8	MF	HUN	Norbert Szendrei
10	MF	GER	Arne Maier
11	MF	HUN	Krisztofer Horváth
14	FW	TOG	Etienne Amenyido
15	MF	HUN	Miron Mucsányi
17	FW	SLO	Aljoša Matko
19	FW	TOG	Prince Balladom
20	DF	AUT	Márió Zeke
21	MF	AUT	Tizian Scharmer

No.	Pos.	Nation	Player
22	GK	HUN	Ádám Szentmihályi
23	GK	HUN	Dávid Banai (captain)
26	FW	NGR	Muhamed Tijani
27	FW	HUN	Ábel Krajcsovics
30	DF	POR	João Nunes
32	GK	HUN	Dávid Dombó
33	DF	HUN	Barnabás Bese
36	DF	HUN	Ferenc Ujváry
38	MF	HUN	Kristóf Sarkadi
39	FW	SUR	Gleofilo Vlijter
45	MF	MKD	Arijan Ademi
77	MF	HUN	Noah Fenyő
88	MF	SRB	Matija Ljujić
94	DF	CZE	Patrizio Stronati

=== Out on loan ===
Note: Flags indicate national team as defined under FIFA eligibility rules; some limited exceptions apply. Players may hold more than one non-FIFA nationality.

No.	Pos.	Nation	Player
—	MF	POL	Damian Rasak (at Katowice)
—	GK	HUN	Bence Juhász (at Mérida)

No.	Pos.	Nation	Player
—	MF	HUN	Bálint Geiger (at NK Karlovac 1919)
—	DF	HUN	Levente Babós (at Budapesti VSC)

== Club officials ==
=== Board of directors ===
As of 5 May 2025

Position	Name
President	(Hungary) Péter Ratatics
Sports director	(Hungary) Pál Dárdai
Managing director	(Hungary) Áron Páll

=== Management ===
As of 8 May 2025

Position	Name
Manager	(Croatia) Damir Krznar
Assistant manager Video analyst	(Croatia) Vedran Attias
Assistant manager	(Serbia) Nikola Mitrović
Assistant manager	(Slovenia) Ales Mertelj
Assistant manager	(Hungary) Boldizsár Bodor
Goalkeeping coach	(Hungary) András Elbert
Body performance coach	(Croatia) Luka Krklješ
Fitness coach	(Hungary) Ádám Száraz
Video analyst	(Hungary) Samu Varga
Video analyst	(Hungary) Balázs Benczés
Club doctor	(Hungary) Iván Kollár Dr.
Club doctor	(Hungary) Péter Lestár Dr.
Physiotherapist	(Serbia) Žarko Milovanović
Physiotherapist	(Serbia) Aleksandar Jovetić
Physiotherapist	(Hungary) Dorottya Varga
Technical manager	(Hungary) Babett Zsitva
Data analyst	(Hungary) Kornélia Tuza
Kit manager	(Hungary) Tamás Nagy
Masseur	(Hungary) József Kádár
Masseur	(Hungary) Kálmán Hénap

== Notable former players ==
- (Belgium) Jonathan Heris
- (Belgium) Kylian Hazard
- (Belgium) Pierre-Yves Ngawa
- (Brazil) Túlio Maravilha
- (Ivory Coast) Lacina Traoré
- (Colombia) Darwin Andrade
- (Central African Republic) Foxi Kéthévoama
- (Czech Republic) Lubos Kozel
- (Czech Republic) Radek Slončík
- (Czech Republic) Robert Vágner
- (England) Scott Malone
- (Finland) Paulus Roiha
- (Georgia (country)) Budu Zivzivadze
- (Mali) Falaye Sacko
- (Mali) Souleymane Diarra
- (Montenegro) Nebojsa Kosovic
- (Nigeria) Kim Ojo
- (Nigeria) Obinna Nwobodo
- (North Macedonia) Enis Bardhi
- (Senegal) Mbaye Diagne
- (Serbia) Marko Dmitrovic
- (Spain) Juanan
- (Sweden) Anton Salétros
- (Trinidad and Tobago) Densill Theobald

== See also ==
- History of Újpest FC
- List of Újpest FC seasons
- Újpest FC in European football
- List of Újpest FC managers
- List of Újpest FC records and statistics
