= List of Hungarian football champions =

The Hungarian football champions are the winners of the highest league in Hungarian football, which is currently the Nemzeti Bajnokság I.

== Nemzeti Bajnokság (1901–present) ==
No.	Season	Champions	Runners-up	Third place	Leading Goalscorer	G.
1.	1901	Budapesti Torna Club	Magyar Úszó Egylet	Ferencváros	Manno (Budapesti Torna Club)	17
2.	1902	Budapesti Torna Club (2)	Ferencváros	33 FC	Manno (2) (Budapesti Torna Club)	10
3.	1903	Ferencváros	Budapesti Torna Club	MTK Budapest	Károly (MTK Budapest)	15
4.	1904	MTK Budapest	Ferencváros	Budapesti Torna Club	Pokorny (Ferencváros)	12
5.	1905	Ferencváros (2)	Postás	MTK Budapest	Károly (2) (MTK Budapest)	13
6.	1906–07	Ferencváros (3)	Magyar Atlétikai Club	MTK Budapest	Kelemen (Magyar Atlétikai Club)	21
7.	1907–08	MTK Budapest (2)	Ferencváros	Magyar Atlétikai Club	Vangel (Magyar Atlétikai Club)	21
8.	1908–09	Ferencváros (4)	Magyar Atlétikai Club	Budapesti Torna Club	Schlosser (Ferencváros)	30
9.	1909–10	Ferencváros (5)	MTK Budapest	Nemzeti Sport Club	Schlosser (2) (Ferencváros)	18
10.	1910–11	Ferencváros (6)	MTK Budapest	Törekvés	Schlosser (3) (Ferencváros)	38
11.	1911–12	Ferencváros (7)	MTK Budapest	Budapesti Atlétikai Klub	Schlosser (4) (Ferencváros)	34
12.	1912–13	Ferencváros (8)	MTK Budapest	Budapesti Torna Club	Schlosser (5) (Ferencváros)	33
13.	1913–14	MTK Budapest (3)	Ferencváros	Törekvés	Schlosser (6) (Ferencváros)	21
—	1915	League Suspended due to World War I.				
—	1916	League Suspended due to World War I.				
14.	1916–17	MTK Budapest (4)	Törekvés	Újpest	Schlosser (7) (MTK Budapest)	38
15.	1917–18	MTK Budapest (5)	Ferencváros	Törekvés	Schaffer (MTK Budapest)	46
16.	1918–19	MTK Budapest (6)	Ferencváros	Újpest	Schaffer (2) (MTK Budapest)	41
17.	1919–20	MTK Budapest (7)	Budapest Honvéd	Ferencváros	Orth (MTK Budapest)	28
18.	1920–21	MTK Budapest (8)	Újpest	Ferencváros	Orth (2) (MTK Budapest)	21
19.	1921–22	MTK Budapest (9)	Ferencváros	Újpest	Orth (3) (MTK Budapest)	26
20.	1922–23	MTK Budapest (10)	Újpest	Ferencváros	Priboj (Újpest)	25
21.	1923–24	MTK Budapest (11)	Ferencváros	Újpest	Jeszmás (Újpest)	15
22.	1924–25	MTK Budapest (12)	Ferencváros	Vasas	Molnár (MTK Budapest)	21
23.	1925–26	Ferencváros (9)	MTK Budapest	Vasas	Takács (Vasas)	29
24.	1926–27	Ferencváros (10)	Újpest	MTK Budapest	Horváth (Ferencváros)	14
25.	1927–28	Ferencváros (11)	MTK Budapest	Újpest	Takács (2) (Ferencváros)	31
26.	1928–29	MTK Budapest (13)	Ferencváros	Újpest	Takács (3) (Ferencváros)	41
27.	1929–30	Újpest	Ferencváros	MTK Budapest	Takács (4) (Ferencváros)	40
28.	1930–31	Újpest (2)	MTK Budapest	Ferencváros	Vincze (Bocskai)	20
29.	1931–32	Ferencváros (12)	Újpest	MTK Budapest	Takács (5) (Ferencváros)	42
30.	1932–33	Újpest (3)	MTK Budapest	Ferencváros	Jávor (Újpest)	31
31.	1933–34	Ferencváros (13)	Újpest	Bocskai	Toldi (Ferencváros)	27
32.	1934–35	Újpest (4)	Ferencváros	MTK Budapest	Cseh (MTK Budapest)	23
33.	1935–36	MTK Budapest (14)	Újpest	Ferencváros	Sárosi (Ferencváros)	36
34.	1936–37	MTK Budapest (15)	Ferencváros	Újpest	Cseh (2) (MTK Budapest)	36
35.	1937–38	Ferencváros (14)	Újpest	MTK Budapest	Zsengellér (Újpest)	31
36.	1938–39	Újpest (5)	Ferencváros	MTK Budapest	Zsengellér (2) (Újpest)	56
37.	1939–40	Ferencváros (15)	MTK Budapest	Újpest	Sárosi (2) (Ferencváros)	23
38.	1940–41	Ferencváros (16)	Újpest	Szeged	Sárosi (3) (Ferencváros)	29
39.	1941–42	Csepel	Újpest	Szolnok	Kalmár (Szeged)	35
40.	1942–43	Csepel (2)	Nagyvárad	Ferencváros	Zsengellér (3) (Újpest) / Jenőfi (Vasas)	26
41.	1943–44	Nagyvárad	Ferencváros	Kolozsvár	Zsengellér (4) (Újpest)	33
42.	1945	Újpest (6)	Ferencváros	Csepel	Zsengellér (5) (Újpest)	36
43.	1945–46	Újpest (7)	Vasas	Csepel	Deák (Szentlőrinc)	66
44.	1946–47	Újpest (8)	Budapest Honvéd	Vasas	Deák (2) (Szentlőrinc)	48
45.	1947–48	Csepel (3)	Vasas	MTK Budapest	Puskás (Budapest Honvéd)	50
46.	1948–49	Ferencváros (17)	MTK Budapest	Budapest Honvéd	Deák (3) (Ferencváros)	59
47.	1949–50	Budapest Honvéd	Ferencváros	MTK Budapest	Puskás (2) (Budapest Honvéd)	31
48.	1950	Budapest Honvéd (2)	MTK Budapest	Újpest	Puskás (3) (Budapest Honvéd)	25
49.	1951	MTK Budapest (16)	Budapest Honvéd	Újpest	Kocsis (Budapest Honvéd)	30
50.	1952	Budapest Honvéd (3)	MTK Budapest	Újpest	Kocsis (2) (Budapest Honvéd)	36
51.	1953	MTK Budapest (17)	Budapest Honvéd	Vasas	Puskás (4) (Budapest Honvéd)	27
52.	1954	Budapest Honvéd (4)	MTK Budapest	Ferencváros	Kocsis (3) (Budapest Honvéd)	33
53.	1955	Budapest Honvéd (5)	MTK Budapest	Ferencváros	Czibor (Budapest Honvéd) / Machos (Budapest Honvéd)	20
—	1956	League Suspended due to the Hungarian Revolution of 1956.				
54.	1957	Vasas	MTK Budapest	Újpest	Szilágyi (Vasas)	17
55.	1957–58	MTK Budapest (18)	Budapest Honvéd	Ferencváros	Friedmanszky (Ferencváros) / Molnár (MTK Budapest)	16
56.	1958–59	Csepel (4)	MTK Budapest	Budapest Honvéd	Kisuczky (Csepel) / Monostori (Dorog) / Tichy (Honvéd)	15
57.	1959–60	Újpest (9)	Ferencváros	Vasas	Albert (Ferencváros)	27
58.	1960–61	Vasas (2)	Újpest	MTK Budapest	Albert (2) (Ferencváros) / Tichy (2) (Budapest Honvéd)	21
59.	1961–62	Vasas (3)	Újpest	Ferencváros	Tichy (3) (Budapest Honvéd)	23
60.	1962–63	Ferencváros (18)	MTK Budapest	Újpest	Bene (Újpest)	23
61.	1963	Győr	Budapest Honvéd	Ferencváros	Tichy (4) (Budapest Honvéd)	13
62.	1964	Ferencváros (19)	Budapest Honvéd	Tatabánya	Tichy (5) (Budapest Honvéd)	28
63.	1965	Vasas (4)	Ferencváros	Újpest	Albert (3) (Ferencváros)	27
64.	1966	Vasas (5)	Ferencváros	Tatabánya	Farkas (Vasas)	25
65.	1967	Ferencváros (20)	Újpest	Győr	Dunai (Újpest)	36
66.	1968	Ferencváros (21)	Újpest	Vasas	Dunai (2) (Újpest)	31
67.	1969	Újpest (10)	Budapest Honvéd	Ferencváros	Bene (2) (Újpest)	27
68.	1970	Újpest (11)	Ferencváros	Budapest Honvéd	Dunai (3) (Újpest)	14
69.	1970–71	Újpest (12)	Ferencváros	Vasas	Kozma (Budapest Honvéd)	25
70.	1971–72	Újpest (13)	Budapest Honvéd	Salgótarján	Bene (3) (Újpest)	29
71.	1972–73	Újpest (14)	Ferencváros	Vasas	Bene (4) (Újpest)	23
72.	1973–74	Újpest (15)	Ferencváros	Győr	Kozma (2) (Budapest Honvéd)	27
73.	1974–75	Újpest (16)	Budapest Honvéd	Ferencváros	Kozma (3) (Budapest Honvéd) / Bene (5) (Újpest)	20
74.	1975–76	Ferencváros (22)	Videoton	Újpest	Farkas (Újpest)	19
75.	1976–77	Vasas (6)	Újpest	Ferencváros	Várady (Vasas)	36
76.	1977–78	Újpest (17)	Budapest Honvéd	MTK Budapest	Farkas (2) (Újpest)	24
77.	1978–79	Újpest (18)	Ferencváros	Diósgyőr	Fekete (Újpest)	31
78.	1979–80	Budapest Honvéd (6)	Újpest	Vasas	Fekete (2) (Újpest)	36
79.	1980–81	Ferencváros (23)	Tatabánya	Vasas	Nyilasi (Ferencváros)	30
80.	1981–82	Győr (2)	Ferencváros	Tatabánya	Hannich (Győr)	22
81.	1982–83	Győr (3)	Ferencváros	Budapest Honvéd	Dobány (Pécs / Szombathely)	23
82.	1983–84	Budapest Honvéd (7)	Győr	Videoton	Szabó (Videoton)	19
83.	1984–85	Budapest Honvéd (8)	Győr	Videoton	Détári (Budapest Honvéd) / Kiprich (Tatabánya)	18
84.	1985–86	Budapest Honvéd (9)	Pécs	Győr	Détári (2) (Budapest Honvéd)	27
85.	1986–87	MTK Budapest (19)	Újpest	Tatabánya	Détári (3) (Budapest Honvéd)	19
86.	1987–88	Budapest Honvéd (10)	Tatabánya	Újpest	Melis (Debrecen)	19
87.	1988–89	Budapest Honvéd (11)	Ferencváros	MTK Budapest	Petres (Videoton)	19
88.	1989–90	Újpest (19)	MTK Budapest	Ferencváros	Dzurják (Ferencváros)	18
89.	1990–91	Budapest Honvéd (12)	Ferencváros	Pécs	Gregor (Budapest Honvéd)	19
90.	1991–92	Ferencváros (24)	Vác	Budapest Honvéd	Fischer (Siófok) / Orosz (Vác)	16
91.	1992–93	Budapest Honvéd (13)	Vác	Ferencváros	Répási (Vác)	16
92.	1993–94	Vác	Budapest Honvéd	Békéscsaba	Illés ( Budapest Honvéd)	17
93.	1994–95	Ferencváros (25)	Újpest	Debrecen	Preisinger (Zalaegerszeg)	21
94.	1995–96	Ferencváros (26)	Budapesti Vasutas	Újpest	(Ukraine) Nichenko (Stadler FC / Ferencváros)	18
95.	1996–97	MTK Budapest (20)	Újpest	Ferencváros	Illés (2) (MTK Budapest)	23
96.	1997–98	Újpest (20)	Ferencváros	Vasas	Tiber (Gázszer)	20
97.	1998–99	MTK Budapest (21)	Ferencváros	Újpest	Illés (3) (MTK Budapest)	22
98.	1999–00	Dunaújváros	MTK Budapest	Vasas	Tököli (Dunaújváros)	22
99.	2000–01	Ferencváros (27)	Dunaújváros	Vasas	Kabát (Vasas)	24
100.	2001–02	Zalaegerszeg	Ferencváros	MTK Budapest	Tököli (2) (Dunaújváros)	28
101.	2002–03	MTK Budapest (22)	Ferencváros	Debrecen	Kenesei (Zalaegerszeg)	23
102.	2003–04	Ferencváros (28)	Újpest	Debrecen	Tóth (Sopron)	17
103.	2004–05	Debrecen	Ferencváros	MTK Budapest	(Slovakia) Medved (Pápa)	18
104.	2005–06	Debrecen (2)	Újpest	Videoton	Rajczi (Újpest)	23
105.	2006–07	Debrecen (3)	MTK Budapest	Zalaegerszeg	(Senegal) Sidibe (Debrecen) / Bajzát (Győr)	18
106.	2007–08	MTK Budapest (23)	Debrecen	Győr	Waltner (Zalaegerszeg)	18
107.	2008–09	Debrecen (4)	Újpest	Szombathely	Bajzát (2) (Győr)	20
108.	2009–10	Debrecen (5)	Videoton	Győr	(Serbia) Nikolić (Videoton)	18
109.	2010–11	Videoton	Paks	Ferencváros	(Brazil) Alves (Videoton)	24
110.	2011–12	Debrecen (6)	Videoton	Győr^{1}	(France) Coulibaly (Debrecen)	20
111.	2012–13	Győr (4)	Videoton	Budapest Honvéd	(France) Coulibaly (2) (Debrecen)	18
112.	2013–14	Debrecen (7)	Győr	Ferencváros	Nikolić^{2} (2) (Videoton) / Simon (Paks)	21
113.	2014–15	Videoton (2)	Ferencváros	MTK Budapest	Nikolić^{2} (3) (Videoton)	21
114.	2015–16	Ferencváros (29)	Videoton	Debrecen	Böde (Ferencváros)	17
115.	2016–17	Budapest Honvéd (14)	Videoton	Vasas	Eppel (Budapest Honvéd)	16
116.	2017–18	Videoton (3)	Ferencváros	Újpest	(Italy) Lanzafame (Budapest Honvéd)	17
117.	2018–19	Ferencváros (30)	Vidi	Debrecen	(Italy) Lanzafame (Ferencváros) / Holender (Budapest Honvéd)	16
118.	2019–20	Ferencváros (31)	Fehérvár	Puskás Akadémia	Radó (Zalaegerszeg)	13
119.	2020–21	Ferencváros (32)	Puskás Akadémia	Fehérvár	Hahn (Paks)	22
120.	2021–22	Ferencváros (33)	Kisvárda	Puskás Akadémia	Ádám (Paks)	31
121.	2022–23	Ferencváros (34)	Kecskemét	Debrecen	Varga (Paks)	26
122.	2023–24	Ferencváros (35)	Paks	Puskás Akadémia	Varga (Ferencváros)	20
123.	2024–25	Ferencváros (36)	Puskás Akadémia	Paks	Böde (Paks)	15
124.	2025–26	Győr (5)	Ferencváros	Paks	Lukács (Puskás Akadémia) / (Slovenia) Matko (Újpest)	17

Notes:

- In the brackets are shown the number of titles won.
- Note 1: Győr finished in the top three of the 2011–12 Hungarian National Championship I, but they will not be eligible to enter either the 2012–13 UEFA Champions League or Europa League due to having been suspended from participating in UEFA competitions for the first season they qualify between the 2011–12 and 2013–14 seasons in relation to club licensing violations. As a result, the fourth-placed team of the league will take one of Hungary's Europa League places in the first qualifying round.
- Note 2: On 28 January 2011, Nikolić obtained Hungarian citizenship. András Palkovics, mayor of Székesfehérvár said that "We know about him that he knows the country, speaks the language since he has big plans with Videoton this year". Nikolić said that "I knew that it is not easy to obtain Hungarian citizenship but I hoped that due to the fact that my mother is Hungarian it would be easier but it turned out to be a bit more difficult".

== Performances ==
=== Performances by club ===
Titles won by club (%)
1. Ferencváros – 36 (29.0%)
2. MTK – 23 (18.5%)
3. Újpest – 20 (16.1%)
4. Honvéd – 14 (11.3%)
5. Debrecen – 7 (5.65%)
6. Vasas – 6 (4.84%)
7. Győr – 5 (4.03%)
8. Csepel – 4 (3.23%)
9. Videoton – 3 (2.42%)
10. BTC – 2 (1.61%)
11. Vác – 1 (0.81%)
12. Nagyvárad – 1 (0.81%)
13. Dunaújváros – 1 (0.81%)
14. Zalaegerszeg – 1 (0.81%)
- Fourteen clubs have been champions among which Nagyvárad have no longer been member of the Hungarian League since the end of World War II.

Club	Winners	Runners-up	Winning Years
Ferencváros	36	37	1903, 1905, 1907, 1909, 1910, 1911, 1912, 1913, 1926, 1927, 1928, 1932, 1934, 1938, 1940, 1941, 1949, 1963, 1964, 1967, 1968, 1976, 1981, 1992, 1995, 1996, 2001, 2004, 2016, 2019, 2020, 2021, 2022, 2023, 2024, 2025
MTK Budapest	23	20	1904, 1908, 1914, 1917, 1918, 1919, 1920, 1921, 1922, 1923, 1924, 1925, 1929, 1936, 1937, 1951, 1953, 1958, 1987, 1997, 1999, 2003, 2008
Újpest *	20	21	1930, 1931, 1933, 1935, 1939, 1945, 1946, 1947, 1960, 1969, 1970, 1971, 1972, 1973, 1974, 1975, 1978, 1979, 1990, 1998
Budapest Honvéd	14	12	1950 (I), 1950 (II), 1952, 1954, 1955, 1980, 1984, 1985, 1986, 1988, 1989, 1991, 1993, 2017
Debrecen	7	1	2005, 2006, 2007, 2009, 2010, 2012, 2014
Vasas	6	2	1957, 1961, 1962, 1965, 1966, 1977
Győr	5	3	1963, 1982, 1983, 2013, 2026
Csepel *	4	–	1942, 1943, 1948, 1959
Videoton	3	7	2011, 2015, 2018
Budapesti Torna Club †	2	1	1901, 1902
Vác	1	2	1994
Nagyvárad ‡	1	1	1944
Dunaújváros †	1	1	2000
Zalaegerszeg	1	–	2002
Magyar Atlétikai Club	–	2	–
Tatabánya	–	2	–
Paks	–	2	–
Puskás Akadémia	–	2	–
Magyar Úszó Egylet	–	1	–
Postás	–	1	–
Törekvés	–	1	–
Pécs	–	1	–
BVSC-Zugló	–	1	–
Kisvárda	–	1	
Kecskemét	–	1	–

Location of Hungarian football champions

Notes:

- † Teams dissolved.
- ‡ After 1946 played in the Romanian Liga I, but was dissolved in 1963.
- * Újpest and Csepel became a district of Budapest on 1 January 1950.
- The Bold teams are currently playing in the 2026–27 season of the Hungarian League.

== See also ==
- Nemzeti Bajnokság I
- Nemzeti Bajnokság II
- Nemzeti Bajnokság III
