= Nemzeti Bajnokság I top scorers =

This is the list of Nemzeti Bajnokság I top scorers season by season.

Season	Player	Club	Goals
1964	(Hungary) Lajos Tichy	Budapest Honvéd	28
1965	(Hungary) Flórián Albert	Ferencváros	27
1966	(Hungary) János Farkas	Vasas	25
1967	(Hungary) Antal Dunai	Újpest	36
1968	(Hungary) Antal Dunai	Újpest	32
1969	(Hungary) Ferenc Bene	Újpest	27
1970	(Hungary) Antal Dunai	Újpest	14
1970–71	(Hungary) Mihály Kozma	Budapest Honvéd	25
1971–72	(Hungary) Ferenc Bene	Újpest	29
1972–73	(Hungary) Ferenc Bene	Újpest	23
1973–74	(Hungary) Mihály Kozma	Budapest Honvéd	27
1974–75	(Hungary) Mihály Kozma (Hungary) Ferenc Bene	Budapest Honvéd; Újpest	20
1975–76	(Hungary) László Fazekas	Újpest	19
1976–77	(Hungary) Béla Váradi	Vasas	36
1977–78	(Hungary) László Fazekas	Újpest	24
1978–79	(Hungary) László Fekete	Újpest	31
1979–80	(Hungary) László Fazekas	Újpest	36
1980–81	(Hungary) Tibor Nyilasi	Ferencváros	29
1981–82	(Hungary) Péter Hannich	Győr	22
1982–83	(Hungary) Lajos Dobány	Pécsi Mecsek; Szombathelyi Haladás	23
1983–84	(Hungary) József Szabó	Videoton	19
1984–85	(Hungary) Lajos Détári (Hungary) József Kiprich	Budapest Honvéd; Tatabánya	18
1985–86	(Hungary) Lajos Détári	Budapest Honvéd	27
1986–87	(Hungary) Lajos Détári	Budapest Honvéd	19
1987–88	(Hungary) Béla Melis	Debrecen	19
1988–89	(Hungary) Tamás Petres	Videoton	19
1989–90	(Hungary) József Dzurják	Ferencváros	18
1990–91	(Hungary) József Gergor	Budapest Honvéd	15
1991–92	(Hungary) Pál Fischer (Hungary) Ferenc Orosz	BFC Siófok; Dunakanyar-Vác	16
1992–93	(Hungary) László Répási	Dunakanyar-Vác	16
1993–94	(Hungary) Béla Illés	Budapest Honvéd	17
1994–95	(Hungary) Sándor Preisinger	Zalaegerszeg	21
1995–96	(Ukraine) Ihor Nichenko	Stadler FC; Ferencváros	18
1996–97	(Hungary) Béla Illés	MTK Budapest	23
1997–98	(Hungary) Krisztián Tiber	Gázszer	20
1998–99	(Hungary) Béla Illés	MTK Budapest	22
1999–2000	(Hungary) Attila Tököli	Dunaújváros	25
2000–01	(Hungary) Péter Kabát	Vasas	24
2001–02	(Hungary) Attila Tököli	Dunaújváros	28
2002–03	(Hungary) Krisztián Kenesei	Zalaegerszeg	22
2003–04	(Hungary) Mihály Tóth	Sopron	17
2004–05	(Slovakia) Tomáš Medveď	Lombard-Pápa	18
2005–06	(Hungary) Péter Rajczi	Újpest	23
2006–07	(Hungary) Péter Bajzát	Győr	18
2007–08	(Hungary) Róbert Waltner	Zalaegerszeg	18
2008–09	(Hungary) Péter Bajzát	Győr	20
2009–10	(Hungary) Nemanja Nikolić	Kaposvári Rákóczi; Videoton	18
2010–11	(Brazil) Andre Alves	Videoton	24
2011–12	(France) Adamo Coulibaly	Debrecen	20
2012–13	(France) Adamo Coulibaly	Debrecen	18
2013–14	(Hungary) Nemanja Nikolić (Hungary) Attila Simon	Videoton; Paks	18
2014–15	(Hungary) Nemanja Nikolić	Videoton	21
2015–16	(Hungary) Dániel Böde	Ferencváros	17
2016–17	(Hungary) Márton Eppel	Budapest Honvéd	16
2017–18	(Italy) Davide Lanzafame	Budapest Honvéd	18
2018–19	(Italy) Davide Lanzafame (Hungary) Filip Holender	Ferencváros; Budapest Honvéd	16
2019–20	(Hungary) András Radó	Zalaegerszeg	13
2020–21	(Hungary) János Hahn	Paks	22
2021–22	(Hungary) Martin Ádám	Paks	31
2022–23	(Hungary) Barnabás Varga	Paks	26
2023–24	(Hungary) Barnabás Varga	Ferencváros	20
2024–25	(Hungary) Dániel Böde	Paks	15
2025–26	(Hungary) Dániel Lukács (Slovenia) Aljoša Matko	Puskás Akadémia; Újpest	17
