= List of Nyíregyháza Spartacus FC seasons =

Nyíregyháza Spartacus FC is a Hungarian professional football club based in Nyíregyháza, Szabolcs-Szatmár-Bereg County.

== Key ==
Nemzeti Bajnokság I

- Pld = Matches played
- W = Matches won
- D = Matches drawn
- L = Matches lost
- GF = Goals for
- GA = Goals against
- Pts = Points
- Pos = Final position

Hungarian football league system

- NBI = Nemzeti Bajnokság I
- NBII = Nemzeti Bajnokság II
- NBIII = Nemzeti Bajnokság III
- MBI = Megyei Bajnokság I

Magyar Kupa

- F = Final
- SF = Semi-finals
- QF = Quarter-finals
- R16 = Round of 16
- R32 = Round of 32
- R64 = Round of 64
- R128 = Round of 128

UEFA

- F = Final
- SF = Semi-finals
- QF = Quarter-finals
- Group = Group stage
- PO = Play-offs
- QR3 = Third qualifying round
- QR2 = Second qualifying round
- QR1 = First qualifying round
- PR = Preliminary round

Winners	Runners-up	Third	Promoted	Relegated

== Seasons ==
As of 13 September 2025.

Season	League										Cup	UEFA		Manager	Ref.
Season	Tier	Div.	Pld	W	D	L	GF	GA	Pts.	Pos.	Cup	Competition	Result	Manager	Ref.
1977–78	3	NBIII ↑	38	14	15	9	48	33	43	7th		Did not qualify			
1978–79	2	NBII	38	24	8	6	57	19	56	2nd		Did not qualify			
1979–80	2	NBII ↑	38	22	9	7	85	33	53	1st		Did not qualify			
1980–81	1	NBI	34	11	16	7	30	25	38	7th	?	Did not qualify		(Hungary) Temesvári	
1981–82	1	NBI	34	8	12	14	35	51	28	15th	?	Did not qualify		(Hungary) Papp	
1982–83	1	NBI	30	9	8	13	29	37	26	10th	?	Did not qualify		(Hungary) Magyar	
1983–84	1	NBI	30	7	8	15	28	47	22	15th	?	Did not qualify		(Hungary) Kovács	
1992–93	1	NBI ↓	30	3	12	15	17	39	18	15th	?	Did not qualify		(Hungary) Sándor, Burcsa	
1993–94	2	NBII	30	12	8	10	33	24	32	8th	?	Did not qualify			
1994–95	2	NBII	30	14	6	10	40	34	48	6th	?	Did not qualify			
1995–96	2	NBII	30	13	4	13	47	42	43	8th	?	Did not qualify			
1996–97	2	NBII	28	14	9	5	39	19	51	3rd	?	Did not qualify			
1997–98	2	NBII ↑	38	24	10	4	66	24	82	1st	?	Did not qualify			
1998–99	1	NBI	34	10	9	15	46	52	39	13th	?	Did not qualify		(Hungary) Őze	
1999–00	1	NBI	32	12	8	12	32	42	44	9th	?	Did not qualify		(Hungary) Őze	
2000–01*	1	NBI ↓	14	3	0	11	10	24	9	8th	?	Did not qualify		(Hungary) Garamvölgyi	
2001–02	2	NBII	32	15	6	11	60	50	51	7th	?	Did not qualify			
2002–03	2	NBII	34	15	10	9	63	44	55	5th	?	Did not qualify			
2003–04	2	NBII ↑	34	16	8	10	40	36	56	5th	?	Did not qualify			
2004–05	1	NBI ↓	30	5	11	14	38	63	26	15th	?	Did not qualify		(Hungary) Détári	
2005–06	2	NBII	28	12	9	7	48	30	45	5th	?	Did not qualify			
2006-07	2	NBII ↑	30	20	9	1	67	24	69	1st	?	Did not qualify			
2007–08	1	NBI	30	11	7	12	34	37	40	10th	?	Did not qualify		(Hungary) Tajti	
2008–09	1	NBI	30	7	11	12	32	41	38	14th	3R	Did not qualify		(Hungary) Tajti, (Hungary) Révész	
2009–10	1	NBI ↓	30	6	9	15	42	60	27	15th	3R	Did not qualify		(Hungary) Szentes	
2010–11	2	NBII	30	18	6	6	66	23	60	3rd	?	Did not qualify			
2011–12	2	NBII	30	10	13	7	50	47	43	7th	?	Did not qualify			
2012–13	2	NBII	30	15	4	11	44	33	49	5th	?	Did not qualify			
2013–14	2	NBII ↑	30	20	6	4	57	23	66	1st	?	Did not qualify			
2014–15	1	NBI ↓	30	8	6	16	33	49	30	12th^{1}	3R	Did not qualify		(Hungary) Csábi, (Hungary) Mátyus	
2015–16	3	NBIII ↑	32	27	2	3	74	19	83	1st	?	Did not qualify		(Hungary) Mátyus	
2016–17	2	NBII	38	14	8	16	48	50	50	12th	?	Did not qualify		(Hungary) Véber	
2017–18	2	NBII	38	16	12	10	54	40	60	5th	?	Did not qualify		(Hungary) Lucsánszky	
2018–19	2	NBII	38	15	11	12	53	49	56	10th	?	Did not qualify		(Serbia) Spišljak	
2019–20^{2}	2	NBII	27	11	2	14	45	45	35	8th	?	Did not qualify		(Hungary) Lengyel	
2020–21	2	NBII	38	16	9	13	40	31	57	7th	?	Did not qualify		(Hungary) Gálhidi, (Kazakhstan) Patsay	
2021–22	2	NBII	38	13	11	14	45	51	50	10th	R64	Did not qualify		(Hungary) Feczkó	
2022–23	2	NBII	38	9	11	18	46	55	38	18th	R32	Did not qualify			
2023–24	2	NBII ↑	34	24	7	3	69	27	79	1st		Did not qualify			
2025–26	1	NB I	6	1	1	4	7	14	4	10th	R64	Did not qualify		(Hungary) Szabó, (Hungary) Bódog	

Notes

- Note 1: Although Nyíregyháza finished 12th in the 2014-15 Nemzeti Bajnokság I season, they were relegated due to license problems.
- Note 2: The 2019–20 Nemzeti Bajnokság II was suspended due to the COVID-19 pandemic.

* The 2000–01 featured a new format involving 2 groups of 8 who played each other twice for 14 games. The top 6 teams in each group went on to form a new group of 12, whereas the bottom 4 teams were relegated.
