= Béla Hegedűs =

Hungarian footballer (born 1958)

Personal information
- Date of birth: 12 April 1958 (age 68)
- Place of birth: Kisvárda, Hungary
- Height: 1.83 m (6 ft 0 in)
- Position: Centre-back

Youth career
- 1972–1975: Tuzsér

Senior career*
Years	Team	Apps	(Gls)
1975–1983	Vasas	140	(2)
1983–1989	Volán	52	(1)
Total		192	(3)

Managerial career
- 1989–1991: Volán (assistant)
- 1992–1995: Százhalombatta
- 1995–1996: Gyöngyös
- 1996: Rákospalota
- 2013–2015: Puskás Akadémia II
- * Club domestic league appearances and goals

Béla Hegedűs (born 12 April 1958) is a Hungarian former football manager and professional player who played as a centre-back.

== Career ==
Hegedűs was born in Kisvárda. In 1975, he moved from Tuzsér to Budapest to join Vasas. During the 1976–77 season, he was a member of Vasas' championship-winning team and made 31 league appearances. Four years later, he won the Magyar Kupa with the club and played the entire final, a 1–0 victory over Diósgyőr. In his final season with Vasas, in 1983, he won the Mitropa Cup. He then joined Volán in Budapest, where he finished his playing career in 1989 before beginning his managerial career. Since the founding of the , Since the founding of Puskás Akadémia, he has worked at the academy. He was the first manager of Puskás Akadémia II and later served as the club's technical director in Nemzeti Bajnokság III.

== Career statistics ==
Appearances and goals by club, season and league
Club	Season	League		
Club	Season	Division	Apps	Goals
Vasas	1975–76	Nemzeti Bajnokság I	8	0
Vasas	1976–77	Nemzeti Bajnokság I	31	0
Vasas	1977–78	Nemzeti Bajnokság I	18	1
Vasas	1978–79	Nemzeti Bajnokság I	22	0
Vasas	1979–80	Nemzeti Bajnokság I	22	0
Vasas	1980–81	Nemzeti Bajnokság I	5	0
Vasas	1981–82	Nemzeti Bajnokság I	20	1
Vasas	1982–83	Nemzeti Bajnokság I	14	0
Vasas	Total		140	2
Volán	1983–84	Nemzeti Bajnokság I	23	1
Volán	1985–86	Nemzeti Bajnokság I	29	0
Volán	Total		52	1
Career total			192	3

== Managerial statistics ==
Managerial record by team and tenure
Team	From	To	Record								Ref
Team	From	To	P	W	D	L	GF	GA	GD	Win %	Ref
Százhalombatta	1992	1995	93	48	19	26	173	112	+61	51.61	
Gyöngyös	1995	1996	30	11	7	12	41	49	−8	36.67	
Rákospalota	1996	September 1996	9	5	0	4	10	8	+2	55.56	
Puskás Akadémia II	2013	2015	60	16	11	33	112	164	−52	26.67	
Total			192	80	37	75	336	333	+3	41.67	

== Honours ==
=== Player ===
Vasas

- Nemzeti Bajnokság I: 1976–77
- Magyar Kupa: 1980–81; runner-up: 1979–80
- Mitropa Cup: 1982–83

Volán

- Nemzeti Bajnokság II: 1984–85

=== Manager ===
Százhalombatta

- Nemzeti Bajnokság III – Duna: 1992–93
