= Attila Gróf =

Hungarian footballer (born 1964)

Personal information
- Date of birth: 16 September 1964 (age 62)
- Place of birth: Tapolca, Hungary
- Height: 1.93 m (6 ft 4 in)
- Position: Goalkeeper

Youth career
- –1982: Tapolca

Senior career*
Years	Team	Apps	(Gls)
1982–1985	Tatabánya	11	(0)
1985–1986	Honvéd	0	(0)
1986–1990	Újpesti Dózsa	23	(0)
1990–1991	Videoton	6	(0)
1991	Volán	7	(0)
1991–1992	Ganz Danubius		
1992–1993	Újpest	13	(0)
1993	Bag	3	(0)
1993–2000	Vasas	4	(0)
2000–2002	Felcsút		
Total		67	(0)
- * Club domestic league appearances and goals

Attila Gróf (born 16 September 1964) is a Hungarian former professional footballer who played as a goalkeeper. He is currently a goalkeeping coach for Megyei Bajnokság I club Rákospalota and Grosics Kapusiskola.

== Career ==
Gróf was born in Tapolca. In July 1982, he transferred from Tapolcai Bauxitbányász to Nemzeti Bajnokság I club Tatabánya, having previously been a Hungary youth international goalkeeper.

Gróf won the 1985–86 Nemzeti Bajnokság I title with Honvéd.

On 12 August 1992, he started in goal for Újpest as they defeated Ferencváros 3–1 in the inaugural Szuperkupa.

On 10 March 1998, Gróf was appointed goalkeeping coach of Vasas while remaining the club's second-choice goalkeeper. His tenure ended on 12 September 2002, when he was dismissed alongside manager József Csábi and the rest of the coaching staff following Vasas's defeat to Tápiószecső in the Magyar Kupa.

== Personal life ==
His son, Dávid Gróf, is also a professional footballer who plays as a goalkeeper, the same position as his father. Both won the Nemzeti Bajnokság I with Honvéd, with Attila Gróf winning the title in 1985–86 and Dávid Gróf doing so 31 years later in 2016–17.

== Career statistics ==
Appearances and goals by club, season and competition
Club	Season	League			Magyar Kupa		Europe		Other		Total	
Club	Season	Division	Apps	Goals	Apps	Goals	Apps	Goals	Apps	Goals	Apps	Goals
Tatabánya	1983–84	Nemzeti Bajnokság I	1	0			—		—		1	0
Tatabánya	1984–85	Nemzeti Bajnokság I	10	0			—		—		10	0
Tatabánya	Total		11	0			—		—		11	0
Újpesti Dózsa	1987–88	Nemzeti Bajnokság I	18	0			—		—		18	0
Újpesti Dózsa	1988–89	Nemzeti Bajnokság I	5	0			—		—		5	0
Újpesti Dózsa	Total		23	0			—		—		23	0
Videoton	1990–91	Nemzeti Bajnokság I	6	0			—		—		6	0
Volán	1990–91	Nemzeti Bajnokság I	7	0			—		—		7	0
Újpest	1992–93	Nemzeti Bajnokság I	13	0	1	0	2 (Note: Appearances in European Cup Winners' Cup)	0	1 (Note: Appearance in Szuperkupa)	0	17	0
Bag	1992–93	Nemzeti Bajnokság II	3	0	—		—		—		3	0
Vasas	1996–97	Nemzeti Bajnokság I	—		1	0	—		—		1	0
Vasas	1997–98	Nemzeti Bajnokság I	1	0	—		3 (Note: Appearances in UEFA Intertoto Cup)	0	—		4	0
Vasas	1998–99	Nemzeti Bajnokság I	3	0	—		—		—		3	0
Vasas	Total		4	0	1	0	3	0	—		8	0
Felcsút	2001–02	Megyei Bajnokság II			1	0	—		—		1	0
Career total			67	0	3	0	5	0	1	0	76	0

== Honours ==
Honvéd

- Nemzeti Bajnokság I: 1985–86

Újpest

- Szuperkupa: 1992
