= FC Eger =

Hungarian football club

- Full name: FC Eger Tengely-Közmű
- Founded: 1977
- Dissolved: 2003
- Ground: Szentmarjay Tibor Városi Stadion, Eger
- Capacity: 6,000
Home colours	Away colours

FC Eger Tengely-Közmű is a defunct professional football club, based in Eger.

== History ==
FC Eger was founded in 1977 through the merger of four local clubs: Egri Dózsa, Egri Kinizsi, Egri Vasas and Egri Volán.

FC Eger won the 1983–84 Nemzeti Bajnokság II season and gained promotion to the first division.

FC Eger finished in the second position of the 1985–86 Nemzeti Bajnokság II season and were promoted to the first division a second time. However, in the 1986–87 Nemzeti Bajnokság I season Eger finished in the last position (16th) and were relegated.

In the 1993–94 Nemzeti Bajnokság II season, Eger finished in the penultimate position and were relegated to the third division.

In 2003, Eger FC was dissolved. However, two years later Egri FC was established; however, as Egri FC is not the legal successor of FC Eger.

== Name changes ==
- 1977: merger of Egri Dózsa, Egri Kinizsi, Egri Vasas and Egri Volán
- Eger Sportegyesület: 1977 - 1994
- Futball Club Eger: 1994 - 1996
- Futball Club Eger-Egertej: 1996 - 1998
- Futball Club Eger Tengely-Közmű: 1998 - ?
- Futball Club Eger: ? - 2003

== Honours ==
- Nemzeti Bajnokság II:
  - Winners (1): 1983–84
- Nemzeti Bajnokság III:
  - Winners (1): 1994–95, 2000–01

== Seasons ==
The table below shows the seasons of FC Eger.

Season	Tier	Club's name	Position	Pts
1976–77	2	Eger SE	9 / 20	40
1977–78	2	Eger SE	5 / 20	46
1978–79	2	Eger SE	3 / 20	51
1979–80	2	Eger SE	5 / 20	40
1980–81	2	Eger SE	12 / 20	40
1981–82	2	Eger SE	2 / 16	41
1982–83	2	Eger SE	7 / 20	39
1983–84	2	Eger SE	1 / 20	55
1984–85	1	Eger SE	15 / 16	25
1985–86	2	Eger SE	2 / 20	53
1986–87	1	Eger SE	16 / 16	17
1987–88	2	Eger SE	13 / 20	37
1988–89	2	Eger SE	6 / 16	47
1989–90	2	Eger SE	4 / 16	47
1990–91	2	Eger SE	8 / 16	29
1991–92	2	Eger SE	9 / 16	28
1992–93	2	Eger SE	14 / 16	26
1993–94	2	FC Eger	15 / 16	21
1994–95	3	FC Eger	1 / 16	75
1995–96	2	FC Eger-Egertej	11 / 16	32
1996–97	2	FC Eger-Egertej	15 / 16	13
1997–98	3	FC Eger-Egertej	10 / 16	36
1998–99	3	FC Eger-Tengely Közmű	9 / 16	35
1999–00	3	FC Eger Tengely-Közmű	3 / 16	56
2000	2	Eger FC	7 / 7	9
2000–01	3	Eger FC	1 / 12	38
2001–02	2	Eger	9 / 12	41
2001–02	2	FC Eger	7 / 12	30
2002–03	4	Agria FC Eger	14 / 16	26
