= 1979–80 Nemzeti Bajnokság II =

Nemzeti Bajnokság II
- Season: 1979–80
- Champions: Kaposvári Rákóczi FC (West); Csepel SC (Central); Nyíregyháza Spartacus FC (East)
- Promoted: Kaposvári Rákóczi FC (West); Csepel SC (Central); Nyíregyháza Spartacus FC (East)
- Relegated: MÁV Nagykanizsa (West); Győri Dózsa SC; Körmendi Dózsa MTE (West); Dunakeszi VSE (Central); Esztergomi Vasas (Central); Jánoshalmi Spartacus (Central); Orosházi MTK (East); Olefin SC (Central); Békécsabai TASK (East)

The 1979–80 Nemzeti Bajnokság II was the 82nd season of the Nemzeti Bajnokság II, the second tier of the Hungarian football league.

== League table ==
=== Western group ===
Pos	Team	Pld	W	D	L	GF	GA	GD	Pts	Promotion or relegation
1	Kaposvári Rákóczi SC	38	26	9	3	91	28	+63	61	Promotion to Nemzeti Bajnokság I
2	Haladás Vasutas SE	38	24	7	7	94	38	+56	55	
3	Nagykanizsai Olajbányász SE	38	18	10	10	63	45	+18	46	
4	Ajkai Aluminium SK	38	16	13	9	51	40	+11	45	
5	Sopron SE	38	17	10	11	48	38	+10	44	
6	Szekszárdi Dózsa SC	38	14	14	10	44	29	+15	42	
7	Sabaria SE	38	15	12	11	47	43	+4	42	
8	Komlói Bányász SK	38	14	13	11	45	42	+3	41	
9	Mohács-Véméndi TE	38	15	8	15	47	40	+7	38	
10	MÁV Dunántúli AC	38	14	9	15	46	46	0	37	
11	KOMÉP SC	38	13	8	17	41	57	−16	34	
12	Bauxitbányász SE	38	12	9	17	47	57	−10	33	
13	Bakony Vegyész TC	38	13	7	18	44	54	−10	33	
14	Bábolnai SE	38	11	11	16	44	56	−12	33	
15	Várpalotai Bányász SK	38	11	11	16	40	53	−13	33	
16	Péti Munkás TE	38	10	13	15	34	60	−26	33	
17	Dorogi AC	38	13	5	20	48	61	−13	31	
18	MÁV Nagykanizsa TE	38	8	14	16	35	57	−22	30	Relegation to Nemzeti Bajnoság III
19	Győri Dózsa SC	38	7	15	16	44	57	−13	29	Relegation to Nemzeti Bajnoság III
20	Körmendi Dózsa MTE	38	8	4	26	38	90	−52	20	Relegation to Nemzeti Bajnoság III

=== Central group ===
Pos	Team	Pld	W	D	L	GF	GA	GD	Pts	Promotion or relegation
1	Csepel SC	38	29	4	5	82	22	+60	62	Promotion to Nemzeti Bajnokság I
2	Bp. Vasas Izzó	38	23	10	5	89	50	+39	56	
3	Szegedi EOL AK	38	19	10	9	60	40	+20	48	
4	Honvéd Bem József SE	38	17	12	9	57	38	+19	46	
5	Váci Híradás	38	14	14	10	53	43	+10	42	
6	Kecskeméti SC	38	14	11	13	66	50	+16	39	
7	22.sz Volán SE	38	11	16	11	58	56	+2	38	
8	Kossuth KFSE	38	16	6	16	56	58	−2	38	
9	Budapesti Spartacus SC	38	14	10	14	50	57	−7	38	
10	BKV Előre	38	10	17	11	47	50	−3	37	
11	Dunaújvárosi Építők	38	12	12	14	46	58	−12	36	
12	Szegedi Dózsa	38	13	9	16	53	50	+3	35	
13	Építők SC	38	11	12	15	44	52	−8	34	
14	Ganz-MÁVAG	38	12	10	16	48	59	−11	34	
15	Budafoki MTE Kinizsi	38	12	14	12	59	55	+4	33 (Note: 5 points deducted)	
16	BVSC	38	10	13	15	39	40	−1	33	
17	Pénzügyőr SE	38	11	9	18	49	62	−13	31	
18	Dunakeszi VSE	38	12	7	19	32	50	−18	31	Relegation to Nemzeti Bajnoság III
19	Esztergomi MIM Vasas	38	8	12	18	37	56	−19	28	Relegation to Nemzeti Bajnoság III
20	Jánoshalmi Spartacus	38	5	6	27	29	108	−79	16	Relegation to Nemzeti Bajnoság III

=== Eastern group ===
Pos	Team	Pld	W	D	L	GF	GA	GD	Pts	Promotion or relegation
1	Nyíregyházi VSSC	38	22	9	7	85	33	+52	53	Promotion to Nemzeti Bajnokság I
2	Szolnoki MÁV MTE	38	17	9	12	63	44	+19	43	
3	HÓDGÉP Metripond SE	38	14	14	10	46	30	+16	42	
4	Debreceni Universitas SE	38	16	10	12	50	44	+6	42	
5	Eger SE	38	13	14	11	46	45	+1	40	
6	Gyöngyösi SE	38	14	12	12	44	51	−7	40	
7	Miskolci VSC	38	14	11	13	61	57	+4	39	
8	Honvéd Szabó Lajos SE	38	13	13	12	45	42	+3	39	
9	Ózdi Kohász SE	38	13	13	12	50	56	−6	39	
10	Kazincbarcikai Vegyész	38	15	8	15	55	48	+7	38	
11	Gyulai SE	38	16	5	17	51	53	−2	37	
12	Honvéd Papp József SE	38	14	9	15	58	61	−3	37	
13	Szarvasi Főiskola Spartacus	38	13	11	14	40	45	−5	37	
14	Lehel SC	38	11	15	12	40	48	−8	37	
15	Debreceni Kinizsi SK	38	13	10	15	49	57	−8	36	
16	Balassagyarmati SE	38	14	6	18	41	52	−11	34	
17	Honvéd Asztalos János SE	38	14	5	19	52	62	−10	33	
18	Orosházi MTK	38	11	11	16	45	57	−12	33	Relegation to Nemzeti Bajnoság III
19	Olefin SC	38	12	7	19	36	55	−19	31	Relegation to Nemzeti Bajnoság III
20	Békéscsabai TASK	38	11	8	19	33	50	−17	30	Relegation to Nemzeti Bajnoság III

== See also ==
- 1979–80 Magyar Kupa
- 1979–80 Nemzeti Bajnokság I
