= 1981–82 Magyar Kupa =

Tournament details
- Country: Hungary

Final positions
- Champions: Újpesti Dózsa
- Runners-up: Videoton

The 1981–82 Magyar Kupa (English: Hungarian Cup) was the 42nd season of Hungary's annual knock-out cup football competition.

== Quarter-finals ==
Team 1	Score	Team 2
Diósgyőr	1–1; 3–5 (pen.)	Békéscsaba Előre Spartacus
Újpesti Dózsa	2–1	Volán
MTK-VM	1–0	Komlói Bányász
Videoton	3–0	Mosonmagyaróvár

== Semi-finals ==
Team 1	Score	Team 2
Videoton	1–0	MTK-VM
Újpesti Dózsa	1–0	Békéscsaba Előre Spartacus

== Final ==
4 April 1982
15:00 (UTC+2)

Újpesti Dózsa	2–0	Videoton
Birkás 45', 78'	Report

Városi Stadion, Szekszárd
Attendance: 18,000
Referee: Miklós Nagy (Hungary)

== See also ==
- 1981–82 Nemzeti Bajnokság I
