= 1985–86 Magyar Kupa =

Tournament details
- Country: Hungary

Final positions
- Champions: Vasas
- Runners-up: Ferencváros

The 1985–86 Magyar Kupa (English: Hungarian Cup) was the 46th season of Hungary's annual knock-out cup football competition.

== Quarter-finals ==
Games were played on February 15, 1986.

Team 1	Score	Team 2
Dunaújvárosi Kohász	2–3	Vasas
Egri	1–0	Budapest Honvéd
Nyiregyhaza	1–3	Ferencváros
Győri MÁV DAC	1–2	Szegedi EOL

== Semi-finals ==
Games were played on February 22, 1986.

Team 1	Score	Team 2
Szeged EOL AK	0–3	Vasas
Egri	1–4	Ferencváros

== Final ==
30 April 1986
18:00 (UTC+2)

Vasas	0–0	Ferencváros
	Report
Penalties
Teodoru (penalty scored); Borostyán (penalty scored); Birinyi (penalty scored); Kovács (penalty scored); Csorba (penalty scored)	5–4	(penalty scored) Pintér; (penalty scored) Strausz; (penalty missed) Szántó; (penalty scored) Kincses; (penalty scored) Takács

Népstadion, Budapest
Attendance: 20,000
Referee: Antal Huták (Hungary)

== See also ==
- 1985–86 Nemzeti Bajnokság I
