= László Budavári =

Football player

Personal information
- Full name: László Budavári
- Date of birth: 3 August 1953 (age 73)
- Place of birth: Budapest, Hungary
- Positions: Forward; left winger

Youth career
- Budapest Honvéd FC

Senior career*
Years	Team	Apps	(Gls)
1972-1974	Budapest Honvéd FC	2	(0)
1974-1975	MTK Budapest FC	2	(0)
1975-1976	Bp. Spartacus	0	(0)
1976-1977	Szolnoki MÁV FC	0	(0)
1977-1981	Békéscsaba	122	(27)
1981-1986	Csepel SC	86	(13)

International career
1982	Hungary	1	(1)
- * Club domestic league appearances and goals

László Budavári (3 August 1953) is a former Hungarian professional footballer who played as forward and left winger. He was a member of the Hungary national team.

== Career ==
He started his football career at Budapest Honvéd FC. In the summer of 1974, he was transferred to VM Egyetértés. After that he played for Bp. Spartacus and Szolnoki MÁV FC. From 1977 to 1981 he played football for Békéscsaba. From there he transferred to Csepel SC, where he finished fourth with the team in the 1982–83 season. Between 1981 and 1986 he played 86 league games for Csepel FC and scored 13 goals.

=== National team ===
In 1982 he made one appearance for the national team and scored one goal.

== Honours ==
- Nemzeti Bajnokság I (NB I)
  - Fourth: 1982-83
