= Dunaújváros FC =

Dunaújváros FC may refer to:

- Dunaújváros FC (1952), former football club founded in 1952 and folded in 2009
- Dunaújváros FC (1998), current football club founded in 1998
