= 1985–86 Nemzeti Bajnokság II =

Nemzeti Bajnokság II
- Season: 1985–86
- Champions: Dunaújváros FC (1952)
- Promoted: Dunaújváros FC (1952) (winners); Eger SE (runners-up)
- Relegated: Honvéd Szabó Lajos SE; Soproni SE; Debreceni Kinizsi; Kazincbarcikai Vegyész

The 1985–86 Nemzeti Bajnokság II was the 88th season of the Nemzeti Bajnokság II, the second tier of the Hungarian football league.

== League table ==
Pos	Team	Pld	W	D	L	GF	GA	GD	Pts	Promotion or relegation
1	Dunaújvárosi Kohász SE	38	22	10	6	67	34	+33	54	Promotion to Nemzeti Bajnokság I
2	Eger SE	38	19	15	4	68	33	+35	53	Promotion to Nemzeti Bajnokság I
3	Szegedi EOL Délép SE	38	21	9	8	75	42	+33	51	
4	Diósgyőri VTK	38	17	11	10	64	47	+17	45	
5	Nyíregyházi VSSC	38	13	14	11	44	39	+5	40	
6	Keszthelyi Haladás SC	38	13	13	12	44	43	+1	39	
7	Salgótarjáni BTC	38	13	11	14	48	45	+3	37	
8	METRIPOND SE	38	12	13	13	54	53	+1	37	
9	Komlói Bányász SK	38	15	7	16	63	72	−9	37	
10	Váci Izzó MTE	38	12	12	14	49	52	−3	36	
11	Nagykanizsai Olajbányász	38	12	12	14	47	52	−5	36	
12	Szolnoki MÁV MTE	38	14	8	16	43	51	−8	36	
13	Bajai SK	38	13	10	15	55	69	−14	36	
14	Szekszárdi Dózsa	38	11	14	13	39	58	−19	36	
15	Ganz-MÁVAG SE	38	11	13	14	57	63	−6	35	
16	Veszprémi SE	38	12	11	15	49	55	−6	35	
17	Honvéd Szabó Lajos SE	38	14	6	18	46	51	−5	34	Relegation to Nemzeti Bajnokság III
18	Soproni SE	38	10	12	16	42	52	−10	32	Relegation to Nemzeti Bajnokság III
19	Debreceni Kinizsi	38	8	12	18	42	58	−16	28	Relegation to Nemzeti Bajnokság III
20	Kazincbarcikai Vegyész SE	38	8	7	23	44	71	−27	23	Relegation to Nemzeti Bajnokság III

== See also ==
- 1985–86 Magyar Kupa
- 1985–86 Nemzeti Bajnokság I
