= 1984–85 Nemzeti Bajnokság II =

Nemzeti Bajnokság II
- Season: 1984–85
- Champions: Volán FC
- Promoted: Volán FC (winners); Siófoki Bányász (runners-up)
- Relegated: Ózdi Kohász SE; 22.sz Volán SC; Tapolcai Bauxitbányász SE

The 1984–85 Nemzeti Bajnokság II was the 87th season of the Nemzeti Bajnokság II, the second tier of the Hungarian football league.

== League table ==
Pos	Team	Pld	W	D	L	GF	GA	GD	Pts	Promotion or relegation
1	Volán SC	38	23	9	6	85	49	+36	55	Promotion to Nemzeti Bajnokság I
2	Siófoki Bányász	38	20	12	6	66	40	+26	52	Promotion to Nemzeti Bajnokság I
3	Váci Izzó MTE	38	18	13	7	59	32	+27	49	
4	Diósgyőri VTK	38	19	10	9	78	50	+28	44 (Note: 4 points deducted)	
5	Salgótarjáni BTC	38	17	9	12	50	36	+14	43	
6	Debreceni Kinizsi	38	16	11	11	63	54	+9	43	
7	Soproni SE	38	15	12	11	49	45	+4	42	
8	Szolnoki MÁV MTE	38	16	9	13	58	43	+15	41	
9	Nyíregyházi VSSC	38	18	9	11	52	34	+18	41 (Note: 4 points deducted)	
10	Kazincbarcikai Vegyész	38	13	13	12	49	43	+6	39	
11	Dunaújvárosi Kohász	38	12	15	11	46	51	−5	39	
12	Metripond SE	38	13	11	14	43	40	+3	37	
13	Bajai SK	38	11	12	15	45	53	−8	34	
14	Szekszárdi Dózsa	38	11	11	16	46	60	−14	33	
15	Keszthelyi Haladás SC	38	11	10	17	38	45	−7	32	
16	Nagykanizsai Olajbányász	38	11	10	17	51	64	−13	32	
17	Bakony Vegyész	38	11	9	18	44	57	−13	31	
18	Ózdi Kohász	38	10	11	17	36	49	−13	31	Relegation to Nemzeti Bajnoság III
19	22. sz. Volán SC	38	5	7	26	36	83	−47	17	Relegation to Nemzeti Bajnoság III
20	Tapolcai Bauxitbányász SE	38	4	9	25	31	97	−66	17	Relegation to Nemzeti Bajnoság III

== See also ==
- 1984–85 Magyar Kupa
- 1984–85 Nemzeti Bajnokság I
