= 1979–80 Nemzeti Bajnokság I =

Annual Hungarian soccer tournament

Nemzeti Bajnokság I
- Season: 1979–80

Statistics of Nemzeti Bajnokság I in the 1979–80 season.

== Overview ==
It was contested by 18 teams, and Budapest Honvéd FC won the championship.

== League standings ==
Pos	Team	Pld	W	D	L	GF	GA	GD	Pts	Qualification or relegation
1	Budapest Honvéd (C)	34	19	10	5	67	38	+29	48	Qualification for European Cup first round
2	Újpesti Dózsa	34	19	7	8	86	64	+22	45	Qualification for UEFA Cup first round
3	Vasas	34	17	10	7	75	52	+23	44	
4	Videoton	34	18	7	9	65	45	+20	43	Qualification for UEFA Cup first round
5	Tatabányai Bányász	34	14	12	8	55	40	+15	40	
6	Ferencváros	34	14	11	9	70	51	+19	39	
7	Pécsi MSC	34	13	10	11	57	40	+17	36	
8	MTK-VM	34	12	10	12	48	50	−2	34	
9	Zalaegerszeg	34	11	12	11	52	56	−4	34	
10	Dunaújvárosi Kohász	34	11	11	12	60	59	+1	33	
11	Volán	34	12	9	13	43	57	−14	33	
12	Diósgyőr	34	12	8	14	47	42	+5	32	Qualification for Cup Winners' Cup first round
13	Rába ETO Győr	34	14	4	16	59	62	−3	32	
14	Békéscsaba	34	10	12	12	54	67	−13	32	
15	Debreceni MVSC	34	8	14	12	39	45	−6	30	
16	Székesfehérvári MÁV Előre (R)	34	6	10	18	28	60	−32	22	Relegation to Nemzeti Bajnokság II
17	Salgótarján (R)	34	5	10	19	35	59	−24	20	Relegation to Nemzeti Bajnokság II
18	Pécsi VSK (R)	34	4	7	23	25	78	−53	15	Relegation to Nemzeti Bajnokság II

Source: rsssf.com
(C) Champions; (R) Relegated

== Results ==
Home \ Away	BÉK	DEB	DIÓ	DUN	FTC	HON	MTK	PMS	PVS	GYŐ	SAL	SME	TAT	ÚJP	VAS	VID	VOL	ZTE
Békéscsaba		2–2	2–2	1–1	2–2	3–3	1–0	2–0	2–0	3–1	3–1	5–1	2–0	1–1	2–2	2–1	1–1	3–1
Debreceni MVSC	2–2		2–1	0–0	0–0	0–1	0–2	1–1	2–2	3–0	1–0	2–0	0–0	2–3	4–1	1–1	1–2	0–0
Diósgyőr	2–1	2–0		2–1	3–0	2–1	2–0	2–0	2–0	0–0	1–2	2–0	1–2	1–2	4–0	1–1	0–2	1–0
Dunaújvárosi Kohász	3–0	1–1	3–2		2–4	0–1	5–2	1–1	4–1	3–0	2–0	3–0	2–2	1–1	3–1	0–3	3–0	1–1
Ferencváros	3–0	3–1	3–1	4–2		2–2	2–2	3–1	6–1	5–2	1–0	1–0	2–1	7–1	0–1	2–5	0–1	3–0
Budapest Honvéd	5–3	1–0	0–0	2–2	1–1		3–2	1–1	1–0	3–0	3–2	2–0	4–0	5–0	3–2	2–0	5–2	1–1
MTK-VM	2–0	0–1	1–4	1–1	1–1	2–1		1–1	3–2	0–0	4–0	0–0	1–0	1–3	2–1	2–0	3–1	2–2
Pécsi MSC	4–2	1–2	2–0	3–0	2–1	0–0	0–1		5–0	1–2	1–0	2–0	1–1	1–1	1–1	7–1	2–2	7–2
Pécsi VSK	0–0	1–1	1–1	2–2	3–1	2–1	0–4	0–1		1–0	0–2	1–0	1–3	1–1	1–2	0–4	0–0	1–2
Rába ETO Győr	4–1	3–1	3–1	2–3	3–1	1–2	3–2	1–0	2–1		1–1	4–1	2–3	2–1	1–1	2–5	4–1	1–3
Salgótarján	1–1	0–0	1–1	0–1	0–0	0–2	1–3	1–1	4–0	1–4		3–3	0–1	3–4	3–4	0–1	2–1	1–0
Székesfehérvári MÁV Előre	1–2	1–0	1–0	1–1	1–1	0–0	0–0	0–2	3–0	1–2	2–2		0–0	1–4	2–2	3–0	3–1	1–0
Tatabányai Bányász	2–0	2–1	1–0	2–0	1–1	2–3	1–1	2–0	5–0	0–2	3–0	4–1		2–0	3–3	1–1	1–1	1–1
Újpesti Dózsa	9–2	6–2	3–2	4–3	4–1	1–2	4–0	3–2	3–1	2–1	2–2	6–1	2–1		4–3	2–4	2–0	3–2
Vasas	5–0	2–1	2–1	4–1	1–1	3–3	3–0	2–1	2–1	3–2	2–0	5–0	2–2	4–2		5–1	2–0	3–1
Videoton	1–0	1–1	3–1	4–1	2–2	1–0	4–2	1–2	6–0	2–0	2–0	0–0	2–1	0–0	1–0		2–1	3–0
Volán	2–1	2–3	0–0	3–2	1–6	2–1	2–0	1–2	1–0	3–2	2–2	1–0	1–3	1–1	0–0	1–0		3–2
Zalaegerszeg	2–2	1–1	2–2	4–2	3–0	1–2	1–1	2–1	2–1	3–2	2–0	2–0	2–2	2–1	1–1	3–2	1–1	

Source: rsssf.com
Legend: Blue = home team win; Yellow = draw; Red = away team win.

== Statistical leaders ==
=== Top goalscorers ===
Rank	Scorer	Club	Goals
1	(Hungary) László Fazekas	Újpesti Dózsa	36
2	(Hungary) Győző Burcsa	Videoton SC	20
2	(Hungary) László Fekete	Újpesti Dózsa	20
4	(Hungary) László Pogány	Ferencvárosi TC	18
4	(Hungary) Béla Várady	Vasas SC	18
6	(Hungary) László Kuti	Dunaújvárosi Kohász	17
7	(Hungary) László Kiss	Vasas SC	16
7	(Hungary) Károly Csapó	Tatabányai Bányász	16
9	(Hungary) Mihály Kozma	Budapest Honvéd	14
10	(Hungary) Péter Hannich	Rába ETO	13
10	(Hungary) József Szabó	Videoton SC	13
10	(Hungary) György Tatár	Diósgyőri VTK	13

== Attendances ==
#	Club	Average
1	Ferencváros	16,647
2	Debrecen	13,647
3	Vasas	12,380
4	Újpest	11,968
5	Budapest Honvéd	10,794
6	Békéscsaba	9,059
7	Diósgyör	7,941
8	Zalaegerszeg	7,147
9	Videoton	6,625
10	Pécs	5,676
11	Dunaújváros	5,471
12	Sálgotarján	5,265
13	Tatabánya Bányász	5,000
14	Volán	4,618
15	Székesfehérvár	3,750
16	Győr	3,735
17	Pécs	3,735
18	MTK	3,294
