= 1982–83 Nemzeti Bajnokság II =

Nemzeti Bajnokság II
- Season: 1982–83
- Champions: Volán FC
- Promoted: Volán FC (winners); Szegedi EOL (runners-up)
- Relegated: Dorogi FC; Tapolcai Bauxitbányász SE; Nagybátonyi Bányász SC

The 1982–83 Nemzeti Bajnokság II was the 85th season of the Nemzeti Bajnokság II, the second tier of the Hungarian football league.

== League table ==
Pos	Team	Pld	W	D	L	GF	GA	GD	Pts	Promotion or relegation
1	Volán SC	38	18	13	7	84	44	+40	49	Promotion to Nemzeti Bajnokság I
2	Szegedi EOL AK	38	19	10	9	70	44	+26	48	
3	Salgótarjáni TC	38	20	7	11	64	43	+21	47	
4	Siófoki Bányász	38	14	15	9	64	49	+15	43	
5	Kecskeméti SC	38	15	12	11	53	44	+9	42	
6	Hódgép-Metripond SE	38	18	5	15	54	54	0	41	
7	Eger SE	38	17	5	16	70	57	+13	39	
8	Bajai SK	38	13	13	12	58	48	+10	39	
9	22. sz. Volán SE	38	14	10	14	67	67	0	38	
10	Ózdi Kohász SE	38	14	10	14	61	63	−2	38	
11	Keszthelyi Haladás SC	38	15	7	16	64	60	+4	37	
12	Kazincbarcikai Vegyész SE	38	15	7	16	58	58	0	37	
13	Soproni SE	38	12	13	13	43	45	−2	37	
14	Debreceni Kinizsi SK	38	11	14	13	47	50	−3	36	
15	Szekszárdi Dózsa SE	38	14	8	16	45	64	−19	36	
16	Nagykanizsai Olajbányász SE	38	15	5	18	59	67	−8	35	
17	Ganz-MÁVAG Vasas SE	38	13	9	16	60	88	−28	35	
18	Dorogi AC	38	11	12	15	52	59	−7	34	Relegation to Nemzeti Bajnoság III
19	Tapolcai Bauxitbányász SE	38	11	7	20	47	64	−17	29	Relegation to Nemzeti Bajnoság III
20	Nagybátonyi Bányász SC	38	8	4	26	48	100	−52	20	Relegation to Nemzeti Bajnoság III

== See also ==
- 1982–83 Magyar Kupa
- 1982–83 Nemzeti Bajnokság I
