= 1983–84 Nemzeti Bajnokság II =

Nemzeti Bajnokság II
- Season: 1983–84
- Champions: Eger SE
- Promoted: Eger SE (winners); Debreceni VSC (runners-up); Békéscsaba 1912 Előre (third place)
- Relegated: Kecskeméti SC; Honvéd Szabó Lajos SE; Ganz-MÁVAG SE

The 1983–84 Nemzeti Bajnokság II was the 86th season of the Nemzeti Bajnokság II, the second tier of the Hungarian football league.

== League table ==
Pos	Team	Pld	W	D	L	GF	GA	GD	Pts	Promotion or relegation
1	Eger SE	38	23	9	6	72	40	+32	55	Promotion to Nemzeti Bajnokság I
2	Debreceni MVSC	38	22	9	7	71	37	+34	53	Promotion to Nemzeti Bajnokság I
3	Békéscsabai Előre Spartacus	38	21	9	8	92	49	+43	51	Promotion to Nemzeti Bajnokság I
4	Siófoki Bányász	38	17	13	8	62	45	+17	43 (Note: 4 points deducted)	
5	Hódgép Metripond SE	38	17	9	12	57	42	+15	43	
6	Bakony Vegyész TC	38	16	8	14	56	56	0	40	
7	Szolnoki MÁV MTE	38	14	11	13	71	58	+13	39	
8	Nagykanizsai Olajbányász SE	38	12	14	12	68	71	−3	38	
9	22. sz. Volán SE	38	13	11	14	50	57	−7	37	
10	Debreceni Kinizsi SK	38	13	11	14	56	59	−3	37	
11	Ózdi Kohász SE	38	14	9	15	56	63	−7	37	
12	Kazincbarcikai Vegyész SE	38	15	6	17	57	66	−9	36	
13	Keszthelyi Haladás SC	38	11	13	14	50	45	+5	35	
14	Soproni SE	38	12	10	16	39	55	−16	34	
15	Bajai SK	38	11	11	16	57	65	−8	33	
16	Salgótarjáni TC	38	10	13	15	51	53	−2	33	
17	Szekszárdi Dózsa SE	38	11	11	16	46	60	−14	33	
18	Kecskeméti SC	38	10	12	16	51	71	−20	32	Relegation to Nemzeti Bajnoság III
19	Honvéd Szabó Lajos SE	38	9	10	19	44	60	−16	28	Relegation to Nemzeti Bajnoság III
20	Ganz-MÁVAG Vasas SE	38	4	11	23	39	93	−54	19	Relegation to Nemzeti Bajnoság III

== See also ==
- 1983–84 Magyar Kupa
- 1983–84 Nemzeti Bajnokság I
