= 1978–79 Nemzeti Bajnokság II =

Nemzeti Bajnokság II
- Season: 1978–79
- Champions: Pécsi VSK (West); Volán FC (Central); Debreceni VSC (East)
- Promoted: Pécsi VSK (West); Volán FC (Central); Debreceni VSC (East)
- Relegated: Oroszlány Bányász SK (West); NIKE Fűzfői AK (West); Répcelaki Bányász SE (West); Honvéd Rákóczi SE (West); Vasas Ikarus SK (Central); Borsodi Bányász (East); Kisvárdai SE (East)

The 1978–79 Nemzeti Bajnokság II was the 81st season of the Nemzeti Bajnokság II, the second tier of the Hungarian football league.

== League table ==
=== Western group ===
Pos	Team	Pld	W	D	L	GF	GA	GD	Pts	Promotion or relegation
1	Pécsi Vasutas SK	38	22	10	6	65	29	+36	54	Promotion to Nemzeti Bajnokság I
2	Komlói Bányász SK	38	20	10	8	46	24	+22	50	
3	Kaposvári Rákóczi	38	14	19	5	48	34	+14	47	
4	MÁV DAC	38	15	11	12	51	50	+1	41	
5	Tapolcai Bauxitbányász SE	38	15	10	13	47	41	+6	40	
6	Sabaria SE	38	14	12	12	33	32	+1	40	
7	Szekszárdi Dózsa	38	16	8	14	41	41	0	40	
8	Nagykanizsai Olajbányász	38	14	11	13	49	42	+7	39	
9	Dorogi AC	38	12	15	11	33	29	+4	39	
10	Bábolnai SE	38	13	13	12	40	42	−2	39	
11	MÁV Nagykanizsai TE	38	13	12	13	41	45	−4	38	
12	KOMÉP Tatabánya	38	13	10	15	36	40	−4	36	
13	Ajkai Alumínium	38	11	13	14	50	50	0	35	
14	Soproni SE	38	13	9	16	35	42	−7	35	
15	Péti MTE	38	10	15	13	51	60	−9	35	
16	Bakony Vegyész	38	10	14	14	42	44	−2	34	
17	Oroszlányi Bányász	38	10	12	16	41	51	−10	32	Relegation to Nemzeti Bajnokság III
18	NIKE Fűzfői AK	38	9	12	17	24	42	−18	30	Relegation to Nemzeti Bajnokság III
19	Répcelaki Bányász SE	38	11	8	19	38	57	−19	30	Relegation to Nemzeti Bajnokság III
20	Honvéd Rákóczi SE	38	8	10	20	33	49	−16	26	Relegation to Nemzeti Bajnokság III

=== Central group ===
Pos	Team	Pld	W	D	L	GF	GA	GD	Pts	Promotion or relegation
1	Volán SC	36	20	11	5	57	28	+29	51	Promotion to Nemzeti Bajnokság I
2	Szegedi Dózsa	36	15	16	5	54	37	+17	46	
3	BVSC	36	15	14	7	52	44	+8	44	
4	22. sz. Volán SE	36	16	11	9	61	42	+19	43	
5	Kossuth KFSE	36	17	8	11	59	49	+10	42	
6	Szegedi EOL AK	36	13	14	9	48	39	+9	40	
7	Váci Híradás	36	14	12	10	43	40	+3	40	
8	Honvéd Bem József SE	36	12	15	9	41	31	+10	39	
9	Budafoki MTE Kinizsi	36	14	11	11	57	48	+9	39	
10	Kecskeméti SC	36	15	9	12	45	42	+3	39	
11	Balassagyarmati SE	36	15	6	15	39	38	+1	36	
12	Építők SC	36	9	16	11	45	45	0	34	
13	BKV Előre	36	13	7	16	43	36	+7	33	
14	Pénzügyőr SE	36	12	8	16	42	61	−19	32	
15	Budapesti Spartacus	36	8	14	14	44	50	−6	30	
16	Ganz-MÁVAG	36	7	16	13	36	43	−7	30	
17	Dunakeszi VSE	36	6	14	16	18	40	−22	26	
18	Dunaújvárosi Építők	36	5	12	19	40	73	−33	22	
19	Vasas Ikarus SK	36	4	10	22	24	62	−38	18	Relegation to Nemzeti Bajnokság III

=== Eastern group ===
Pos	Team	Pld	W	D	L	GF	GA	GD	Pts	Promotion or relegation
1	Debreceni VSC	38	28	7	3	86	23	+63	63	Promotion to Nemzeti Bajnokság I
2	Nyíregyházi VSSC	38	24	8	6	57	19	+38	56	
3	Eger SE	38	20	11	7	62	37	+25	51	
4	Honvéd Papp József SE	38	19	12	7	71	37	+34	50	
5	Kazincbarcikai Vegyész	38	18	9	11	61	41	+20	45	
6	Szolnoki MTE	38	18	9	11	54	48	+6	45	
7	Debreceni MTE	38	16	11	11	61	43	+18	43	
8	Ózdi Kohász	38	17	7	14	55	49	+6	41	
9	Szarvasi Főiskola Spartacus	38	15	10	13	50	40	+10	40	
10	Leninvárosi MTK	38	12	14	12	49	50	−1	38	
11	Lehel SC	38	13	10	15	47	52	−5	36	
12	HÓDGÉP Metripond SE	38	12	10	16	53	65	−12	34	
13	Honvéd Szabó Lajos SE	38	11	11	16	31	42	−11	33	
14	Miskolci VSC	38	10	11	17	46	58	−12	31	
15	Békéscsabai TASK	38	12	7	19	42	56	−14	31	
16	Szolnoki MÁV	38	10	11	17	43	61	−18	31	
17	Gyulai SE	38	11	6	21	34	73	−39	28	
18	Gyöngyösi Spartacus	38	9	8	21	31	51	−20	26	
19	Borsodi Bányász	38	7	8	23	39	72	−33	22	Relegation to Nemzeti Bajnokság III
20	Kisvárdai SE	38	3	10	25	30	85	−55	16	Relegation to Nemzeti Bajnokság III

== Promotion play-offs ==
=== Western ===
Várpalotai Bányász SK - Oroszlányi Bányász SK 2–0 (1–0)

Mohács-Véméndi TE - NIKE Fűzfői AK 1–0 (0–0)

=== Central ===
Dunaújvárosi Építők SK - DÉLÉP SC (Szeged) 4–1 (1–0)

Dunakeszi Vasutas SE - Honvéd Szondi SE (Székesfehérvár) 2–0 (1–0)

=== Eastern ===
Debreceni Kinizsi - Gyöngyösi Spartacus 3–1 (0–1)

== See also ==
- 1978–79 Magyar Kupa
- 1978–79 Nemzeti Bajnokság I
