= Tibor Őze =

Hungarian footballer

Őze Tibor
Personal information
- Date of birth: 8 October 1951 (age 75)
- Place of birth: Budapest, Hungary

Senior career*
Years	Team	Apps	(Gls)
1973–1974	Csepel SC	7	

Managerial career
- 1997-2000: Nyíregyháza
- 2001: Kaposvár
- 2003: Honvéd
- 2004: Diósgyőr
- 2005: Putnok
- 2016: Gyula
- 2018: Szeged
- * Club domestic league appearances and goals

Tibor Őze (born 8 October 1951) is a Hungarian professional football manager and former player.

== Managerial career ==
=== Honvéd ===
On 6 January 2003, he was appointed as the manager of Budapest Honvéd FC. On 13 April 2003, he was dismissed.

=== Diósgyőr ===
On 7 January 2004, he was appointed as the manager of Nemzeti Bajnokság II club Diósgyőri VTK. He replaced Károly Gergely.

=== Gyula ===
On 21 June 2016, he managed Gyulai FC.
