= Miltiades Manno =

Hungarian sportsman

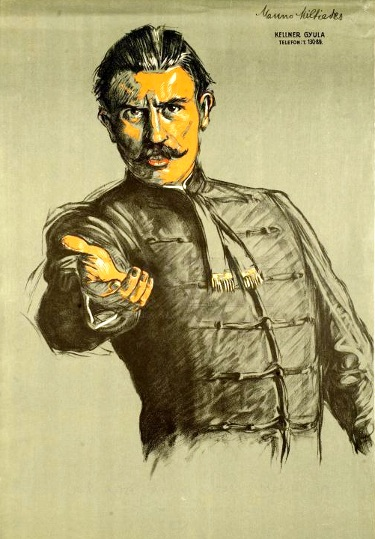

Personal information
- Born: 19 February 1879 Pancsova, Austria-Hungary
- Died: 16 February 1935 (aged 55) Budapest, Hungary
- Weight: 76 kg (168 lb)

Sport
- Sport: Rowing
Medal record
Art competitions
Representing Hungary
Olympic Games
Silver medal – second place	1932 Los Angeles	Sculpture: Statues

Miltiades Manno (19 February 1879 – 16 February 1935) was a Greek-born Hungarian rower and artist. Manno was born in Pancsova, Austria-Hungary and died in Budapest.

In 1912 Manno was a member of the Hungarian boat which was eliminated in the first round of the men's eight event.

At the 1932 Olympic Games Manno won a silver medal in the art competitions of the Olympics for his "Wrestling".

== Sources ==
- The Games of the Xth Olympiad Los Angeles 1932 (PDF). Xth Olympiade Committee of the Games of Los Angeles, U.S.A. 1932. 1933. pp. 748–765. Archived from the original (PDF) on 10 April 2008.
- Wagner, Juergen. "Olympic Art Competition 1932". Olympic Games Museum. Archived from the original on 1 May 2008.
- Kramer, Bernhard (May 2004). "In Search of the Lost Champions of the Olympic Art Contests" (PDF). Journal of Olympic History. 12 (2): 29–34. Archived (PDF) from the original on 10 April 2008.
- Evans, Hilary; Gjerde, Arild; Heijmans, Jeroen; Mallon, Bill; et al. "Miltiades Manno". Olympics at Sports-Reference.com. Sports Reference LLC. Archived from the original on 17 April 2020.
