= Lajos Détári =

Hungarian footballer and manager

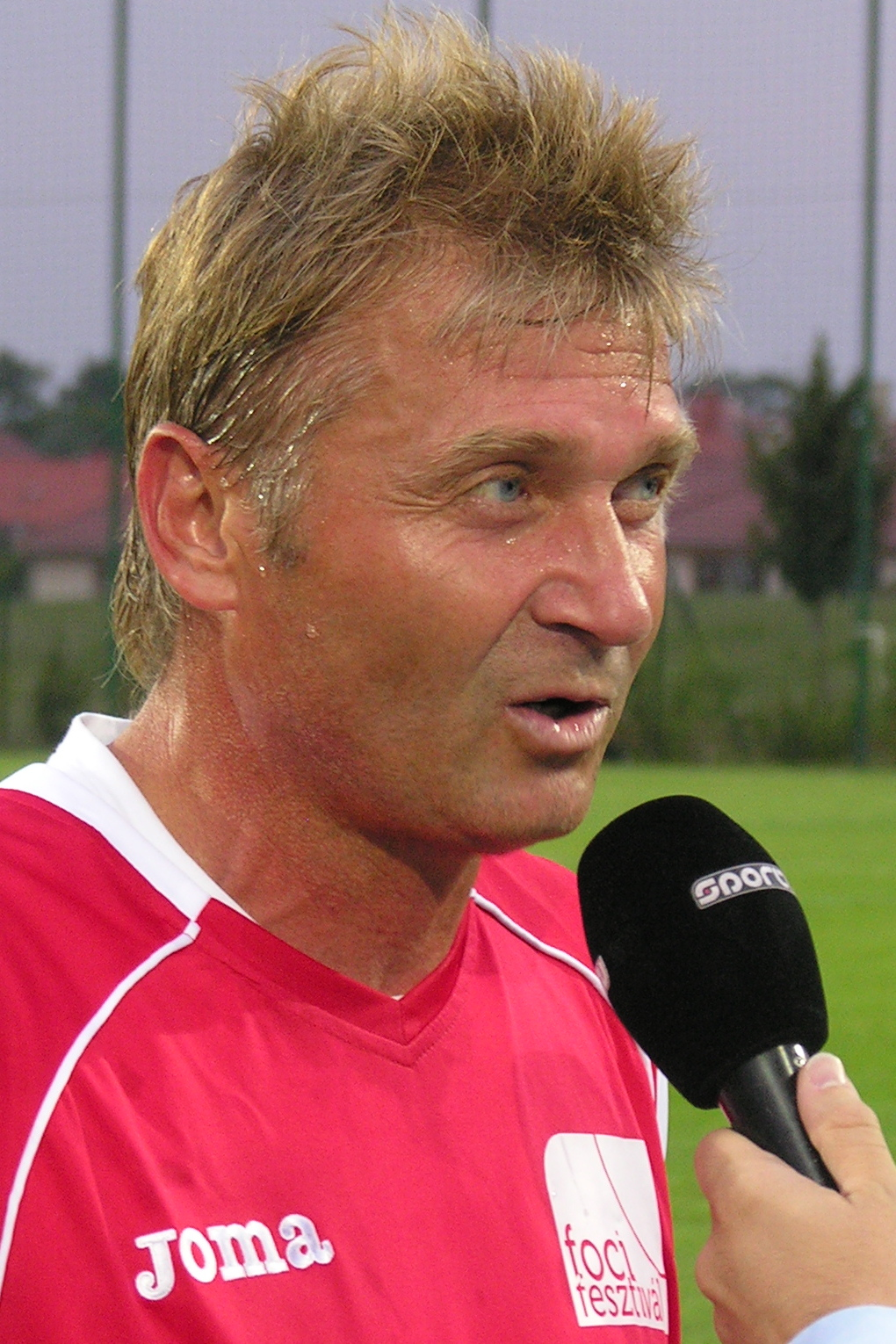
- Détári in 2011

Personal information
- Full name: Lajos László Détári
- Date of birth: 24 April 1963 (age 63)
- Place of birth: Budapest, Hungary
- Height: 1.78 m (5 ft 10 in)
- Position: Midfielder

Youth career
- 1972–1973: FC Aszfaltútépitő Budapest
- 1973–1980: Budapest Honvéd

Senior career*
| Years | Team | Apps | (Gls) |
| 1980–1987 | Budapest Honvéd | 134 | (72) |
| 1987–1988 | Eintracht Frankfurt | 33 | (11) |
| 1988–1990 | Olympiacos | 55 | (33) |
| 1990–1992 | Bologna | 42 | (14) |
| 1992–1993 | Ancona | 32 | (9) |
| 1993 | Ferencváros | 13 | (1) |
| 1993–1994 | Genoa | 8 | (1) |
| 1994–1995 | Neuchâtel Xamax | 38 | (12) |
| 1996–1998 | VSE St. Pölten | 13 | (8) |
| 1999 | BVSC Budapest | 17 | (8) |
| 1999–2000 | Dunakeszi VSE | 17 | (4) |
| Total | | 402 | (173) |

International career
| 1984–1994 | Hungary | 61 | (13) |

Managerial career
- 2001: FC Bihor
- 2001–2002: Csepel SC
- 2002: Budapest Honvéd
- 2002–2003: LG-ACB Ha Noi
- 2003: Szombathelyi Haladás
- 2004: FC Tatabánya
- 2004: Diósgyőri VTK
- 2005: Nyíregyháza Spartacus
- 2005: Panserraikos
- 2005–2006: Unione FC Budapest
- 2006: Hungary (assistant coach)
- 2007: Felsőpakony FC
- 2007: MFC Sopron
- 2008: BFC Siófok
- 2009: BFC Siófok (youth team)
- 2009: Vecsési FC
- 2009–2010: FK Tornala
- 2011–2012: Ferencváros
- * Club domestic league appearances and goals

Lajos László Détári (born 24 April 1963) is a Hungarian football manager and former player who played as a midfielder. At the height of his career (1984–1994), he was a well-respected player throughout Europe, winning "Player of the Year" titles in Hungary, Greece and Switzerland.

== Playing career ==
Détári was born in Budapest. In 1984 he made his debut for the Hungarian national team against Switzerland. He scored 13 goals in 61 caps for his country until 1994. He was a participant at the 1986 FIFA World Cup in Mexico, where Hungary failed to progress from the group stage. Détári scored one goal in the 2–0 victory against Canada. To this day, this remains the last scored goal by Hungary in the World Cup finals.

In 1987 Détári was transferred from Honvéd Budapest to Eintracht Frankfurt in the Bundesliga for DM 3.6 millions (equivalent to €1.73 million in 2021). In the 1987–88 season he scored 11 goals in 33 games. On 28 May 1988, Détári scored the goal in the 1–0 victory against VfL Bochum at the German Cup final. It was a direct free kick just outside the box, leading Eintracht to their fourth German Cup win. Détári had played in all six cup games that season.

At the beginning of the following season Détári was on the move for a world record fee of £6 million. He arrived in Greece to a tumultuous reception by the Piraeus club's supporters. Unfortunately, he did not justify the expectations of Olympiacos or the money spent in his acquisition, leaving after only two years in the midst of the scandal involving the owner of Olympiacos, George Koskotas. Still, in those two years he managed 35 goals in 60 league games, many of them from set plays which was his specialty.

After leaving Greece, Détári played for many clubs. Further clubs that Détári played for were Bologna F.C. 1909, Ancona Calcio, Neuchâtel Xamax and VSE St. Pölten.

== Managerial career ==
After his playing days were over, Détári tried his hand at coaching in Hungary with Honved, in Vietnam for three months and in Greece with Panserraikos. He also coached Hungarian team Nyíregyháza and Haladás Szombathely. From March to October 2006, he was also co-trainer of the Hungarian national team active under Péter Bozsik. He started the 2007–08 season as MFC Sopron boss, but was sacked in October following a number of poor results in the league. In January 2008, he was hired as a coach by F.C. Poros, the local team of the Greek island of Poros.

=== Honvéd ===
On 2 January 2002, Détári was appointed as the manager of Budapest Honvéd. He replaced Róbert Glázer who left for Újpest. Détári's team surprisingly beat the Hungarian champions Zalaegerszeg by 1–0 in the Bozsik Stadion. On 20 August 2004, he returned to Honvéd as an assistant coach with György Bognár. The pair replaced György Gálhidi who was sacked by Honvéd after an unsuccessful start in the Hungarian League.

=== Haladás ===
Détári achieved promotion with Szombathelyi Haladás in 2003. On 27 August 2003, Détári resigned from his position even after his team made a good start.

=== Ferencváros ===
On 30 August 2011, Détári was appointed as the head coach of the Hungarian club Ferencváros due to the resignation of László Prukner after several defeats in the Hungarian League and the early farewell from the Europa League. Ferencváros won the first match with Détári by 2–0 against Zalaegerszeg which was coached by Ferencváros's former coach László Prukner.

== Personal life ==
On 15 February 2024, he watched the UEFA Europa Conference League match between Olympiacos F.C. and Ferencvárosi TC at the Karaiskakis Stadium in Athens. He has his own seat at the stadium with his name on it.

== Honours ==
Budapest Honvéd

- Hungarian League: 1983–84, 1984–85, 1985–86
- Hungarian Cup: 1984–85

Eintracht Frankfurt

- DFB-Pokal: 1987–88

Olympiacos

- Greek Cup: 1989–90

Individual

- Hungarian top scorer: 1985, 1986, 1987
