= 1980–81 Magyar Kupa =

Tournament details
- Country: Hungary

Final positions
- Champions: Vasas
- Runners-up: Diósgyőr

The 1980–81 Magyar Kupa (English: Hungarian Cup) was the 41st season of Hungary's annual knock-out cup football competition.

== Quarter-finals ==
Games were played on March 18, 1981.

Team 1	Score	Team 2
Diósgyőr	1–0	Ferencváros
Nyíregyházi VSSC	1–2	Vasas
Győri MÁV DAC	0–5	Budapest Honvéd
Újpesti Dózsa	2–1	MTK-VM

== Semi-finals ==
Games were played on April 20, 1981.

Team 1	Score	Team 2
Diósgyőr	2–1	Újpesti Dózsa
Vasas	2–1	Budapest Honvéd

== Third place match ==
Game was played on June 21, 1981.

Team 1	Score	Team 2
Újpesti Dózsa	2–0	Budapest Honvéd

== Final ==
21 June 1981
20:00 (UTC+2)

Vasas	1–0	Diósgyőr
Izsó 72'	Report

Szeol stadion, Szeged
Attendance: 18,000
Referee: Sándor Kuti (Hungary)

== See also ==
- 1980–81 Nemzeti Bajnokság I
