= 1980–81 Nemzeti Bajnokság I =

Nemzeti Bajnokság I
- Season: 1980–81

Statistics of Nemzeti Bajnokság I in the 1980–81 season.

== Overview ==
It was contested by 18 teams, and Ferencvárosi TC won the championship.

== League standings ==
Pos	Team	Pld	W	D	L	GF	GA	GD	Pts	Qualification or relegation
1	Ferencváros (C)	34	21	9	4	75	33	+42	51	Qualification for European Cup first round
2	Tatabányai Bányász	34	19	10	5	50	25	+25	48	Qualification for UEFA Cup first round
3	Vasas	34	18	10	6	68	38	+30	46	Qualification for Cup Winners' Cup first round
4	Videoton	34	19	6	9	60	38	+22	44	Qualification for UEFA Cup first round
5	Budapest Honvéd	34	15	12	7	56	36	+20	42	
6	Debreceni MVSC	34	14	10	10	37	29	+8	38	
7	Nyíregyházi VSSC	34	11	16	7	30	25	+5	38	
8	Újpesti Dózsa	34	10	16	8	53	49	+4	36	
9	Békéscsaba	34	13	10	11	51	48	+3	36	
10	Pécs	34	9	13	12	43	43	0	31	
11	Rába ETO Győr	34	9	13	12	43	43	0	31	
12	Csepel	34	6	15	13	34	38	−4	27	
13	Zalaegerszeg	34	10	7	17	52	70	−18	27	
14	Volán	34	8	11	15	39	57	−18	27	
15	Diósgyőr	34	5	15	14	28	50	−22	25	
16	Kaposvár (R)	34	6	12	16	34	67	−33	24	Relegation to Nemzeti Bajnokság II
17	MTK-VM (R)	34	4	14	16	34	60	−26	22	Relegation to Nemzeti Bajnokság II
18	Dunaújvárosi Kohász (R)	34	4	11	19	34	72	−38	19	Relegation to Nemzeti Bajnokság II

Source: rsssf.com
(C) Champions; (R) Relegated

== Results ==
Home \ Away	BÉK	CSE	DEB	DIÓ	DUN	FTC	HON	KAP	MTK	NYÍ	PÉC	GYŐ	TAT	VAS	VID	VOL	ÚJP	ZTE
Békéscsaba		4–2	2–0	3–0	2–1	1–1	1–1	3–0	1–0	0–2	3–2	1–0	0–1	0–1	2–0	2–1	1–1	1–0
Csepel	1–1		1–1	3–0	1–0	0–0	0–2	3–1	1–1	0–0	1–1	1–2	0–1	1–1	4–0	2–0	1–1	2–0
Debreceni MVSC	1–1	1–1		0–0	3–0	1–0	0–0	2–0	2–0	2–0	0–0	1–1	0–1	1–3	1–0	2–0	3–2	3–1
Diósgyőr	2–4	0–0	0–0		2–1	0–0	0–2	1–1	3–1	1–0	0–0	2–2	1–2	0–2	0–1	1–1	2–2	3–2
Dunaújvárosi Kohász	2–2	1–1	0–2	0–0		1–1	1–1	1–1	2–2	1–2	2–1	1–1	1–1	1–4	4–1	2–1	0–0	0–1
Ferencváros	3–1	1–0	4–1	2–1	8–0		4–2	6–2	4–2	3–1	4–0	2–1	3–0	1–0	3–1	1–0	0–3	4–1
Budapest Honvéd	1–0	3–1	2–0	1–1	5–1	0–1		2–1	3–3	2–0	4–1	4–2	1–1	3–3	1–0	1–0	0–0	3–1
Kaposvár	2–1	1–1	0–2	1–1	3–0	1–1	1–1		1–0	0–1	2–1	0–3	0–3	2–0	1–4	0–0	1–1	1–1
MTK-VM	1–2	1–1	2–2	0–0	1–2	1–3	1–0	2–4		1–2	1–0	1–0	0–3	1–4	0–3	2–2	1–1	0–0
Nyíregyházi VSSC	3–1	1–0	1–0	2–0	0–0	0–1	0–0	0–0	1–1		0–0	0–0	0–0	1–0	0–0	1–1	1–1	1–1
Pécs	1–0	1–0	2–1	2–2	2–0	1–1	1–1	3–0	0–0	2–2		1–0	3–0	3–3	1–1	5–1	0–1	5–1
Rába ETO Győr	2–2	1–1	1–0	2–0	3–1	2–2	1–2	0–0	1–1	0–0	1–1		2–0	1–1	3–0	0–0	2–3	1–0
Tatabányai Bányász	1–0	1–0	2–0	0–1	1–0	1–1	2–2	2–0	2–0	1–1	1–0	3–2		1–1	2–0	2–0	5–0	3–0
Vasas	4–0	3–2	0–1	2–1	4–2	2–1	1–0	5–2	3–0	0–2	0–0	5–1	1–1		1–1	2–1	1–1	3–1
Videoton	3–1	2–0	0–1	5–0	2–0	1–0	1–0	4–1	4–2	2–1	2–1	3–1	2–2	1–0		7–2	0–0	3–2
Volán	4–4	0–0	1–0	1–0	3–0	1–3	1–3	5–1	1–1	1–1	2–1	1–0	0–2	1–1	0–3		3–1	0–0
Újpesti Dózsa	2–2	3–2	0–0	2–0	5–2	0–2	2–1	3–3	2–2	1–2	5–1	2–1	1–1	1–3	0–0	2–3		3–0
Zalaegerszeg	2–2	2–0	1–3	3–3	5–4	4–4	3–2	4–0	0–2	2–1	1–0	1–3	2–1	2–4	1–3	4–1	3–1	

Source: rsssf.com
Legend: Blue = home team win; Yellow = draw; Red = away team win.

== Statistical leaders ==
=== Top goalscorers ===
Rank	Scorer	Club	Goals
1	(Hungary) Tibor Nyilasi	Ferencvárosi TC	30
2	(Hungary) László Kiss	Vasas SC	25
3	(Hungary) György Kerekes	Debreceni MVSC	19
4	(Hungary) István Gass	Zalaegerszegi TE	17
5	(Hungary) Ignác Izsó	Vasas SC	15
5	(Hungary) József Szabó	Videoton SC	15
7	(Hungary) Márton Esterházy	Budapest Honvéd	13
7	(Hungary) István Kovács	Tatabányai Bányász	13
7	(Hungary) Mihály Kozma	Budapest Honvéd	13
7	(Hungary) Ádám Kurucz	Békéscsabai Előre Spartacus	13
7	(Hungary) Pogány László	Ferencvárosi TC	13

== Attendances ==
No.	Club	Average	Change	Highest
1	Ferencváros	15,526	-6,7%	32,000
2	Nyíregyházi VSSC	14,176	39,6%	25,000
3	Debreceni MVSC	9,647	-29,3%	22,000
4	Békéscsaba	8,294	-8,4%	15,000
5	Kaposvár	8,000	51,3%	16,000
6	Diósgyőr	7,235	-8,9%	13,000
7	Budapest Honvéd	6,971	-35,4%	30,000
8	Vasas	6,794	-45,1%	15,000
9	Újpesti Dózsa	6,059	-49,4%	18,000
10	Videoton	5,471	-17,4%	15,000
11	Pécs	5,441	-4,1%	12,000
12	Tatabányai Bányász	5,206	4,1%	15,000
13	Zalaegerszeg	5,000	-30,0%	15,000
14	Volán	4,471	-3,2%	15,000
15	MTK-VM	4,324	31,3%	15,000
16	Csepel	3,618	154,6%	12,000
17	Rába ETO Győr	3,500	-6,3%	14,000
18	Dunaújvárosi Kohász	3,294	-39,8%	6,000
