= 1981–82 Nemzeti Bajnokság I =

Nemzeti Bajnokság I
- Season: 1981–82

Statistics of Nemzeti Bajnokság I in the 1981–82 season.

== Overview ==
It was contested by 18 teams, and Győri ETO FC won the championship.

== League standings ==
Pos	Team	Pld	W	D	L	GF	GA	GD	Pts	Qualification or relegation
1	Rába ETO Győr (C)	34	21	7	6	102	50	+52	49	Qualification for European Cup first round
2	Ferencváros	34	20	4	10	76	46	+30	44	Qualification for UEFA Cup first round
3	Tatabányai Bányász	34	15	13	6	58	43	+15	43	Qualification for UEFA Cup first round
4	Videoton	34	18	5	11	49	44	+5	41	
5	Újpesti Dózsa	34	14	12	8	49	37	+12	40	Qualification for Cup Winners' Cup first round
6	Budapest Honvéd	34	15	9	10	54	40	+14	39	
7	Csepel	34	11	14	9	37	34	+3	36	
8	Pécs	34	15	5	14	51	45	+6	35	
9	Haladás	34	13	9	12	46	42	+4	35	
10	Békéscsaba	34	11	13	10	44	44	0	35	
11	Debreceni MVSC	34	13	8	13	46	55	−9	34	
12	Vasas	34	12	8	14	57	54	+3	32	
13	Zalaegerszeg	34	9	14	11	33	47	−14	32	
14	Diósgyőr	34	9	11	14	48	62	−14	29	
15	Nyíregyházi VSSC	34	8	12	14	35	51	−16	28	
16	Volán (R)	34	5	11	18	43	61	−18	21	Relegation to Nemzeti Bajnokság II
17	SZEOL (R)	34	8	4	22	35	74	−39	20	Relegation to Nemzeti Bajnokság II
18	Ózdi Kohasz (R)	34	7	5	22	41	75	−34	19	Relegation to Nemzeti Bajnokság II

Source: rsssf.com
(C) Champions; (R) Relegated

== Results ==
Home \ Away	BÉK	CSE	DEB	DIÓ	FTC	HAL	HON	NYÍ	ÓZD	PÉC	GYŐ	SZE	TAT	VAS	VID	VOL	ÚJP	ZTE
Békéscsaba		0–0	2–1	4–1	3–1	2–1	0–0	3–3	1–0	1–2	0–1	1–0	0–2	0–0	1–1	2–1	1–1	1–1
Csepel	0–0		5–0	2–2	0–1	0–0	2–1	0–0	2–1	1–0	3–4	2–0	0–0	3–0	3–1	2–0	1–1	0–0
Debreceni MVSC	2–4	1–0		2–1	0–1	3–1	1–1	2–0	2–1	0–2	3–2	3–1	3–2	2–1	2–0	0–0	1–1	0–0
Diósgyőr	2–2	0–2	2–1		2–0	1–0	0–0	1–1	5–1	2–0	4–4	1–0	1–1	3–5	0–1	2–0	0–0	0–1
Ferencváros	3–1	4–0	3–2	1–1		0–1	2–4	3–0	5–1	2–1	3–4	3–2	5–1	1–3	3–0	1–0	5–0	4–0
Haladás	1–0	0–0	0–0	3–2	1–2		1–0	3–1	6–1	1–2	5–1	3–1	1–1	2–0	1–1	3–0	1–1	1–1
Budapest Honvéd	3–3	0–1	2–1	2–1	0–2	3–0		3–2	3–2	2–0	1–1	1–0	1–3	3–1	1–2	1–1	3–0	1–0
Nyíregyházi VSSC	1–1	1–0	0–1	3–0	1–1	1–0	1–1		1–0	1–0	1–1	2–1	1–1	1–4	2–1	1–1	2–1	1–1
Ózdi Kohasz	2–0	2–3	0–2	5–0	4–4	0–0	0–2	3–1		0–2	4–3	1–0	0–2	3–1	2–0	2–2	0–0	0–1
Pécs	2–0	2–1	1–1	1–3	1–0	4–1	1–1	2–1	2–0		1–2	4–1	0–0	3–2	1–2	4–2	2–2	3–1
Rába ETO Győr	1–1	5–0	8–1	7–1	2–0	3–0	1–0	3–1	9–2	2–1		8–0	5–3	3–1	5–1	4–2	2–0	3–1
SZEOL	1–3	2–2	3–2	0–2	2–1	4–3	0–3	2–1	2–1	2–1	1–4		0–2	2–1	1–2	2–0	0–1	1–1
Tatabányai Bányász	2–1	2–2	3–1	3–3	1–4	0–1	4–0	1–1	1–1	4–1	0–0	2–1		1–0	3–2	1–1	1–0	3–1
Vasas	2–0	0–0	3–2	2–1	2–4	4–1	0–1	2–0	3–1	2–1	1–1	0–0	1–1		2–2	3–1	0–2	5–0
Videoton	1–4	1–0	2–0	3–0	0–1	0–2	2–1	1–0	2–0	1–0	2–2	5–0	0–2	3–1		2–1	1–0	2–1
Volán	0–1	3–0	0–0	2–2	3–4	1–1	1–6	4–1	5–0	1–2	2–0	2–2	1–3	1–1	1–1		1–3	2–1
Újpesti Dózsa	4–0	0–0	2–3	1–1	2–1	2–0	3–2	3–1	1–0	1–1	3–1	4–0	2–0	2–2	0–1	2–1		2–0
Zalaegerszeg	1–1	0–0	1–1	2–1	1–1	0–1	1–1	0–0	2–1	2–1	1–0	2–1	2–2	3–2	1–3	1–0	2–2	

Source: rsssf.com
Legend: Blue = home team win; Yellow = draw; Red = away team win.

== Statistical leaders ==
=== Top goalscorers ===
Rank	Scorer	Club	Goals
1	(Hungary) Péter Hannich	Rába ETO	22
2	(Hungary) Lázár Szentes	Rába ETO	21
3	(Hungary) György Kerekes	Debreceni MVSC	19
4	(Hungary) István Weimper	Tatabányai Bányász	17
4	(Hungary) Sándor Kiss	Újpesti Dózsa	17
6	(Hungary) László Szokolai	Ferencvárosi TC	16
7	(Hungary) Gyula Hajszán	Rába ETO	15
7	(Hungary) Ferenc Szabó	Szombathelyi Haladás	15
9	(Hungary) Lajos Dobány	Pécsi MSC	14

== Attendances ==
Average home league attendance top 3:

#	Club	Average
1	Ferencváros	19,941
2	Győr	10,559
3	Nyíregyháza	10,147
