= László Fekete (footballer) =

Hungarian footballer

Personal information
- Date of birth: 14 April 1954
- Place of birth: Budapest, Hungary
- Date of death: 4 March 2014 (aged 59)
- Place of death: Budapest, Hungary
- Position: Striker

Senior career*
| Years | Team | Apps | (Gls) |
| 1973–1982 | Újpest Dózsa | 202 | (126) |
| 1982–1983 | Volán Budapest | | |
| 1983–1984 | Újpest Dózsa | 31 | (10) |
| 1985 | Sturm Graz | 11 | (2) |
| 1985–1986 | Komlói Bányász | | |

International career^{‡}
| 1974–1979 | Hungary | 21 | (5) |
- * Club domestic league appearances and goals as of 8 March 2014 ‡ National team caps and goals as of 8 March 2014

László Fekete (14 April 1954 – 4 March 2014) was a Hungarian footballer of the 1970s and 1980s.

From 1974 to 1979 he made 21 appearances and scored 5 goals for the Hungary national football team. He was the top scorer of the Hungarian league in 1978/79 with 31 goals, which meant that he received the Silver boot for being the second highest scoring player in Europe. He played as a striker.

== Club career ==
He played for Újpesti Dózsa, Sturm Graz, Volán FC and Komlói Bányász. He was born in Budapest.

== International career ==
Fekete made his debut for Hungary in a March 1974 friendly match against Bulgaria and had earned a total of 21 caps, scoring 5 goals. His final international was an October 1979 friendly match against the United States.

== Death ==
He died on 4 March 2014 of natural causes, aged 59.
