= László Kiss (footballer) =

Hungarian football manager and player (born 1956)

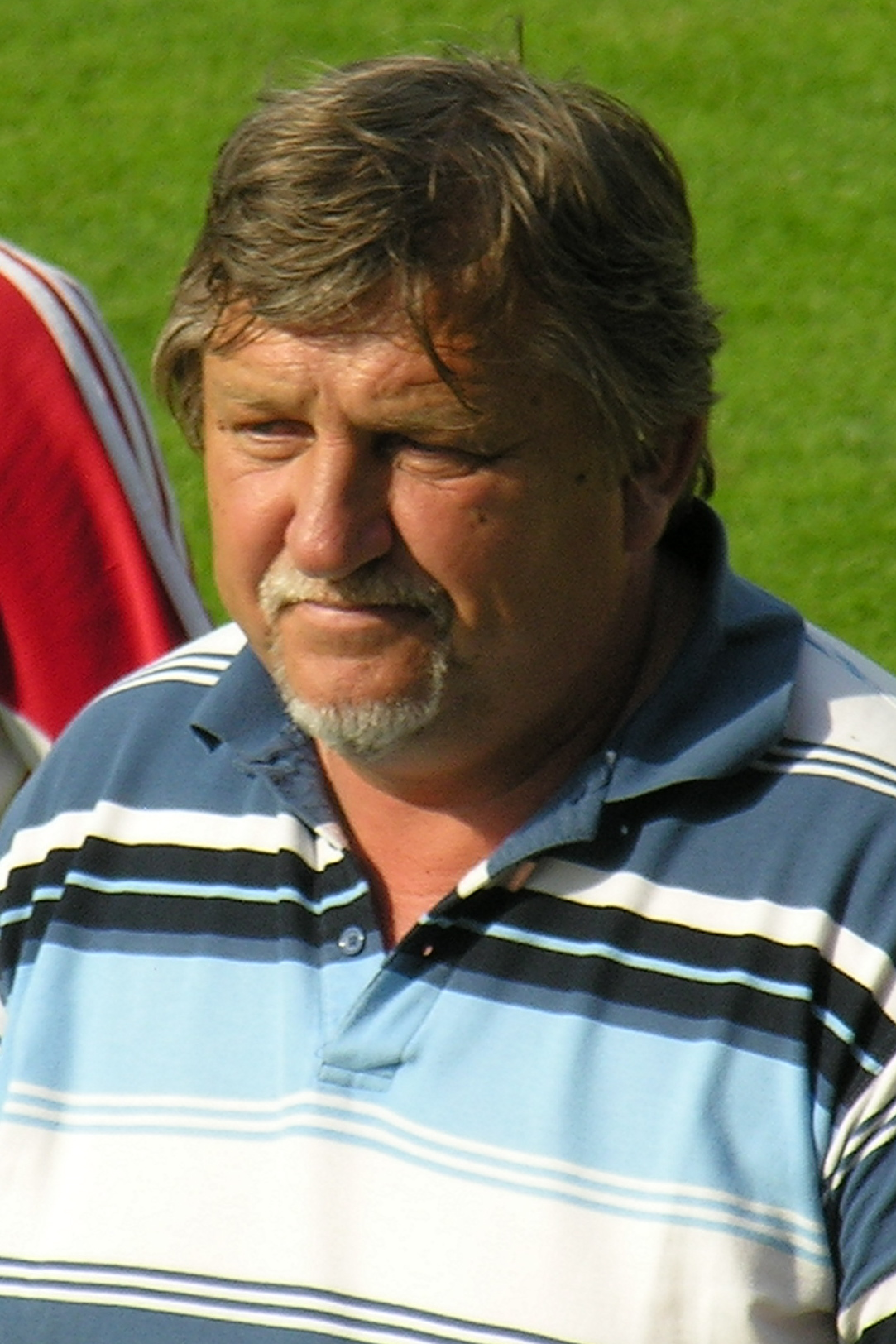

Personal information
- Full name: László Kiss
- Date of birth: 12 March 1956 (age 70)
- Place of birth: Taszár, Hungary
- Height: 1.83 m (6 ft 0 in)
- Position: Striker

Senior career*
Years	Team	Apps	(Gls)
1974–1976	Pécsi Mecsek		
1976–1978	Kaposvári Rákóczi		
1978–1985	Vasas		
1985–1987	Montpellier	38	(12)
1987–1988	MTK Budapest		
1988–1989	Erzsébeti Spartacus MTK LE		
1989	Veszprém		
1989–1991	BVSC Budapest		

International career
1979–1984	Hungary	33	(11)

Managerial career
- 1993–1994: Lajosmizse
- 1994–xxxx: Beremend
- 1996–1999: Rákospalota
- 2000–2011: 1. FC Femina
- 2010–2012: Hungary (women)
- * Club domestic league appearances and goals

László Kiss (born 12 March 1956) is a Hungarian retired football manager and former professional player who played as a striker.

Kiss was born at Taszár. He played for the Hungary national team in the 1982 FIFA World Cup. During a match against El Salvador that ended 10–1 in Hungary's favor, Kiss became the only substitute player in FIFA World Cup history to score a hat-trick. It was also the fastest hat-trick in the tournament's history, being completed in seven minutes.
