= Béla Melis =

Hungarian footballer (1959–2024)

Personal information
- Date of birth: 25 September 1959
- Place of birth: Békéscsaba, Hungary
- Date of death: 19 July 2024 (aged 64)
- Position: Forward

Senior career*
Years	Team	Apps	(Gls)
1978–1980	Budapest Honvéd		
1980–1985	Békéscsabai Előre		
1985–1987	Rába ETO		
1987–1988	Debreceni MVSC		
1989	Vasas SC		

International career
- Hungary U20
- * Club domestic league appearances and goals

Béla Melis (25 September 1959 – 19 July 2024) was a Hungarian footballer who played as a forward. He was a squad member for the 1979 FIFA World Youth Championship and became Nemzeti Bajnokság I top goalscorer in 1987–88. Melis died on 19 July 2024, at the age of 64.
