= 1983–84 Nemzeti Bajnokság I =

Annual Hungarian soccer tournament

Nemzeti Bajnokság I
- Season: 1983–84

Statistics of Nemzeti Bajnokság I in the 1983–84 season.

== Overview ==
It was contested by 16 teams, and Budapest Honvéd FC won the championship, for the seventh time in their history.

In the first half of the season Honvéd, Újpest, Tatabánya and Videoton all spent several weeks atop the table. The Fehérvár side were leading the title race going into the winter break (although they were joint on points with Budapest Honvéd). This all changed however, in March 1984 when Honvéd obliterated MTK 8-0, and overtook Videoton due to their superior goal difference. Imre Komora's side would stay first place until the end of the season, winning their second title of the decade. Kisoest confirmed their status as champions on Matchday 27, defeating Csepeli SC 2–0 at Béke Téri Stadion.

== League standings ==
Pos	Team	Pld	W	D	L	GF	GA	GD	Pts	Qualification or relegation
1	Budapest Honvéd (C)	30	19	6	5	63	24	+39	44	Qualification for European Cup first round
2	Rába ETO Győr	30	14	9	7	66	58	+8	37	Qualification for UEFA Cup first round
3	Videoton	30	16	5	9	47	31	+16	37	Qualification for UEFA Cup first round
4	Újpesti Dózsa	30	12	11	7	49	33	+16	35	
5	Tatabányai Bányász	30	13	9	8	40	37	+3	35	
6	Vasas	30	14	5	11	46	40	+6	33	
7	Zalaegerszeg	30	11	8	11	38	37	+1	30	
8	MTK-VM	30	10	9	11	39	44	−5	29	
9	Szeged	30	10	9	11	42	44	−2	29	
10	Pécs	30	8	12	10	36	38	−2	28	
11	Csepel	30	9	9	12	36	43	−7	27	
12	Ferencváros	30	9	9	12	43	44	−1	27	
13	Haladás	30	10	6	14	29	42	−13	26	
14	Volán (R)	30	7	10	13	42	54	−12	24	Relegation to Nemzeti Bajnokság II
15	Nyíregyházi VSSC (R)	30	7	8	15	28	47	−19	22	Relegation to Nemzeti Bajnokság II
16	Diósgyőr (R)	30	2	9	19	25	53	−28	13	Relegation to Nemzeti Bajnokság II

Source: rsssf.com
(C) Champions; (R) Relegated

== Results ==
Home \ Away	CSE	DIÓ	FTC	HAL	HON	MTK	NYÍ	PÉC	GYŐ	SZE	VAS	VID	VOL	ÚJP	TAT	ZTE
Csepel		2–1	1–0	2–0	0–2	2–1	0–3	3–0	2–1	1–1	1–3	2–1	0–4	0–0	1–1	1–2
Diósgyőr	1–1		1–3	0–1	1–1	2–0	– (Note: The match between Diósgyőr and Volán declared void, no points for both teams.)	2–2	2–3	1–2	2–1	3–4	0–3	0–0	0–0	1–2
Ferencváros	1–2	3–0		2–2	0–1	2–0	2–1	1–0	2–2	3–2	1–1	0–0	2–2	1–1	1–1	0–2
Haladás	0–0	1–0	1–0		2–1	1–1	1–2	2–0	1–5	1–1	1–2	3–0	2–2	1–0	1–2	2–1
Budapest Honvéd	0–0	4–0	3–0	2–0		8–0	3–0	2–1	1–1	3–1	4–1	0–1	2–0	1–1	3–1	1–0
MTK-VM	2–1	3–1	4–0	3–2	0–2		2–0	0–0	0–0	2–0	2–2	1–3	3–1	3–4	1–1	0–0
Nyíregyházi VSSC	2–1	1–0	0–4	3–0	0–2	0–1		0–0	2–2	1–0	0–1	1–1	1–1	1–3	1–1	1–1
Pécs	1–1	5–2	1–1	1–0	1–1	1–2	2–1		3–1	5–2	1–0	0–1	1–0	1–1	0–1	1–1
Rába ETO Győr	1–1	3–2	3–2	1–0	1–3	4–3	7–2	3–1		1–1	2–6	2–1	5–3	2–1	2–2	3–2
Szeged	2–2	0–0	3–3	3–0	4–3	0–0	2–0	0–0	4–2		1–0	1–0	3–0	4–1	0–2	0–0
Vasas	3–1	3–0	4–2	0–1	0–1	1–0	1–0	0–0	3–1	3–2		2–1	2–1	1–4	2–0	0–0
Videoton	1–0	2–1	1–0	1–0	3–2	0–1	4–0	1–1	1–2	3–0	3–1		5–0	2–1	3–0	1–0
Volán	2–5	0–0	0–3	3–0	– (Note: The match between Vólan and Honvéd declared void, no points for both teams.)	2–2	1–1	2–2	1–1	0–1	3–1	3–0		1–1	2–1	1–1
Újpesti Dózsa	4–2	0–0	0–1	3–1	2–2	1–1	3–0	2–1	2–0	1–0	1–1	2–2	1–2		3–0	4–0
Tatabányai Bányász	2–1	2–1	4–3	0–0	1–2	1–0	1–4	4–1	1–1	2–0	2–0	1–1	4–1	1–0		1–0
Zalaegerszeg	1–0	1–1	1–0	1–2	2–3	2–1	0–0	1–3	3–4	4–2	2–1	1–0	4–1	1–2	2–0	

Source: rsssf.com
Legend: Blue = home team win; Yellow = draw; Red = away team win.

== Statistical leaders ==
=== Top goalscorers ===
Rank	Scorer	Club	Goals
1	(Hungary) József Szabó	Videoton SC	19
2	(Hungary) Márton Esterházy	Budapest Honvéd	17
3	(Hungary) László Kiss	Vasas SC	16
4	(Hungary) Péter Hannich	Rába ETO	15
5	(Hungary) Béla Bodonyi	Budapest Honvéd	14
5	(Hungary) Gyula Plotár	Tatabányai Bányász	14
7	(Hungary) Sándor Kiss	Újpesti Dózsa	13
8	(Hungary) Lajos Dobány	Szombathelyi Haladás / Pécsi MSC	11
8	(Hungary) István Gass	Zalaegerszegi TE	11
8	(Hungary) György Szeibert	Volán FC	11

== Attendances ==
Average home league attendance top 3:

#	Club	Average
1	Ferencváros	17,048
2	Győr	15,933
3	Budapest Honvéd	10,048
