= Mihály Kozma =

Hungarian footballer

Personal information
- Date of birth: 1 November 1949 (age 76)
- Place of birth: Tápé, Hungary
- Position: Midfielder

Senior career*
Years	Team	Apps	(Gls)
1969–1981	Budapest Honvéd FC		
1981–1983	Thor Waterschei		
1982–1984	Budapest Honvéd FC		

International career
1969–1975	Hungary	17	(3)

Managerial career
- 1995: Budapest Honvéd FC
Medal record
Representing Hungary
Men's football
Silver medal – second place	1972 Munich	Team competition
- * Club domestic league appearances and goals

Mihály Kozma (born 1 November 1949) is a Hungarian former footballer who played as a midfielder. He played for Budapest Honvéd FC and Belgium's Thor Waterschei.

He won a silver medal in football at the 1972 Summer Olympics, and also participated in UEFA Euro 1972 for the Hungary national football team. He was part of Honvéd's team winning the Hungarian Championship in 1980 and 1984, respectively, and has several times been the Hungarian First Division's top scorer. His brothers György and Zoltán also played in the Hungarian First Division with Szeged, Mihály's team also prior to his move to Honvéd in early 1969.

He was prevented from making a more spectacular career due to a serious injury he suffered in the summer of 1975 during a preparatory tournament, which almost cut his career short. Having been three-times Hungarian top goal scorer in the 1970s, he spent a short period with Belgium's Thor Waterschei in the early 1980s, before returning to Honvéd in 1982. Although hardly a titular anymore, he still managed to score a number of important goals as a substitute, which proved particularly instrumental in ensuring Honvéd's 1984 championship win, following which he ended his active career.

He later also served Honvéd as team manager.
