= 1985–86 Nemzeti Bajnokság I =

Nemzeti Bajnokság I
- Season: 1985–86
- Champions: Budapest Honvéd
- Relegated: Csepel; Volán
- European Cup: Budapest Honvéd
- UEFA Cup: Pécs; Győr
- Cup Winners' Cup: Vasas
- Matches: 240
- Goals: 606 (2.53 per match)
- Top goalscorer: Lajos Détári (27)

Statistics of Nemzeti Bajnokság I in the 1985–86 season.

== Overview ==
It was contested by 16 teams, and Budapest Honvéd FC won the championship under coach Imre Komora, for the third consecutive time, and for the 9th time in the club's history. Kispest went unbeaten at home for the entire season, and would only suffer two losses throughout the campaign. Honvéd were leading the table by the winter-break, 4 points above Pécsi-MFC. Pécs kept applying pressure on Honvéd throughout the spring, but a 2–4 loss to the defending champions on the penultimate day of the season sealed the Baranya-county club's fate, as Honvéd extended their lead to seven points, with one game to go. Regardless, József Garami took Pécs to their highest ever NB1 finish.

== League standings ==
| Pos | Team | Pld | W | D | L | GF | GA | GD | Pts | Qualification or relegation |
|---|---|---|---|---|---|---|---|---|---|---|
| 1 | Budapest Honvéd (C) | 30 | 17 | 11 | 2 | 63 | 29 | +34 | 45 | Qualification for European Cup first round |
| 2 | Pécs | 30 | 15 | 9 | 6 | 48 | 26 | +22 | 39 | Qualification for UEFA Cup first round |
| 3 | Győr | 30 | 13 | 11 | 6 | 60 | 43 | +17 | 37 | Qualification for UEFA Cup first round |
| 4 | Zalaegerszeg | 30 | 12 | 12 | 6 | 48 | 34 | +14 | 36 | |
| 5 | Ferencváros | 30 | 12 | 10 | 8 | 35 | 29 | +6 | 34 | |
| 6 | Videoton | 30 | 10 | 12 | 8 | 25 | 24 | +1 | 32 | |
| 7 | MTK-VM | 30 | 11 | 7 | 12 | 45 | 39 | +6 | 29 | |
| 8 | Tatabányai Bányász | 30 | 9 | 11 | 10 | 34 | 30 | +4 | 29 | |
| 9 | Vasas | 30 | 11 | 7 | 12 | 37 | 43 | −6 | 29 | Qualification for Cup Winners' Cup first round |
| 10 | Haladás | 30 | 9 | 9 | 12 | 34 | 37 | −3 | 27 | |
| 11 | Újpesti Dózsa | 30 | 8 | 9 | 13 | 32 | 44 | −12 | 25 | |
| 12 | Békéscsaba | 30 | 8 | 9 | 13 | 35 | 48 | −13 | 25 | |
| 13 | Debreceni MVSC | 30 | 7 | 11 | 12 | 24 | 46 | −22 | 25 | |
| 14 | Siofoki Bányász | 30 | 8 | 8 | 14 | 28 | 46 | −18 | 24 | |
| 15 | Csepel (R) | 30 | 8 | 6 | 16 | 28 | 41 | −13 | 22 | Relegation to Nemzeti Bajnokság II |
| 16 | Volán (R) | 30 | 5 | 12 | 13 | 30 | 47 | −17 | 22 | Relegation to Nemzeti Bajnokság II |

Source: rsssf.com
(C) Champions; (R) Relegated

== Results ==
| Home \ Away | BÉK | CSE | DEB | FTC | GYŐ | HAL | HON | MTK | PÉC | SIÓ | TAT | ÚJP | VAS | VOL | VID | ZTE |
|---|---|---|---|---|---|---|---|---|---|---|---|---|---|---|---|---|
| Békéscsaba | | 1–1 | 0–0 | 1–1 | 2–2 | 2–0 | 1–3 | 1–0 | 0–1 | 3–0 | 3–1 | 0–1 | 1–1 | 2–2 | 1–2 | 3–2 |
| Csepel | 0–3 | | 2–0 | 2–1 | 2–0 | 0–1 | 1–2 | 3–1 | 0–0 | 1–2 | 0–3 | 2–1 | 1–0 | 3–0 | 0–1 | 0–0 |
| Debreceni MVSC | 1–1 | 2–1 | | 0–0 | 1–1 | 1–0 | 1–1 | 1–2 | 0–0 | 2–1 | 1–2 | 0–3 | 1–0 | 0–0 | 0–0 | 0–0 |
| Ferencváros | 1–1 | 1–0 | 2–0 | | 1–1 | 2–1 | 1–1 | 1–1 | 1–0 | 0–0 | 2–0 | 3–1 | 1–0 | 3–1 | 0–1 | 2–1 |
| Győr | 4–1 | 3–1 | 4–2 | 4–5 | | 3–2 | 0–1 | 1–1 | 2–0 | 3–1 | 2–1 | 2–2 | 5–1 | 2–0 | 1–0 | 1–1 |
| Haladás | 0–1 | 2–0 | 4–2 | 2–0 | 2–1 | | 0–0 | 2–1 | 1–2 | 1–0 | 1–1 | 1–1 | 2–3 | 1–1 | 3–2 | 2–2 |
| Budapest Honvéd | 3–2 | 2–2 | 7–0 | 2–0 | 1–1 | 2–1 | | 5–5 | 0–0 | 2–1 | 0–0 | 6–0 | 2–1 | 4–1 | 3–0 | 0–0 |
| MTK-VM | 2–0 | 3–2 | 2–0 | 0–1 | 2–2 | 2–0 | 0–2 | | 1–1 | 6–0 | 1–0 | 3–1 | 1–2 | 3–0 | 2–0 | 2–3 |
| Pécs | 4–1 | 2–1 | 3–0 | 1–1 | 1–1 | 2–1 | 2–4 | 2–0 | | 6–0 | 3–1 | 2–2 | 1–0 | 4–0 | 2–0 | 2–4 |
| Siofoki Bányász | 1–2 | 3–0 | 2–0 | 2–0 | 0–0 | 0–0 | 0–1 | 0–0 | 0–3 | | 2–2 | 1–0 | 2–0 | 1–0 | 1–1 | 0–0 |
| Tatabányai Bányász | 6–1 | 2–0 | 2–0 | 0–0 | 2–0 | 1–1 | 2–2 | 0–1 | 1–2 | 3–2 | | 1–0 | 0–0 | 2–0 | 0–0 | 1–1 |
| Újpesti Dózsa | 0–0 | 0–0 | 0–0 | 1–0 | 2–3 | 0–1 | 2–3 | 2–1 | 1–0 | 0–1 | 1–0 | | 0–1 | 1–1 | 2–0 | 1–1 |
| Vasas | 2–1 | 1–0 | 2–3 | 0–2 | 3–5 | 0–0 | 1–0 | 2–1 | 0–0 | 4–2 | 0–0 | 6–3 | | 2–2 | 0–0 | 3–2 |
| Volán | 2–0 | 2–3 | 1–2 | 2–1 | 0–1 | 2–2 | 0–2 | 2–0 | 0–0 | 2–2 | 2–0 | 2–3 | 3–1 | | 0–0 | 2–2 |
| Videoton | 2–0 | 2–0 | 1–1 | 0–0 | 2–2 | 1–0 | 0–0 | 2–0 | 2–0 | 2–1 | 0–0 | 2–2 | 0–1 | 0–0 | | 2–1 |
| Zalaegerszeg | 3–0 | 0–0 | 2–3 | 3–2 | 4–3 | 2–0 | 4–2 | 1–1 | 1–2 | 2–0 | 2–0 | 1–0 | 2–0 | 0–0 | 1–0 | |

Source: rsssf.com
Legend: Blue = home team win; Yellow = draw; Red = away team win.

== Statistical leaders ==
=== Top goalscorers ===
| Rank | Scorer | Club | Goals |
|---|---|---|---|
| 1 | (Hungary) Lajos Détári | Budapest Honvéd | 27 |
| 2 | (Hungary) Péter Hannich | Győri ETO FC | 17 |
| 2 | (Hungary) Béla Melis | Győri ETO FC | 17 |
| 4 | (Hungary) Imre Nagy | Zalaegerszegi TE | 14 |
| 5 | (Hungary) Imre Boda | MTK-VM | 13 |
| 5 | (Hungary) György Szeibert | MTK-VM | 13 |
| 5 | (Hungary) József Kiprich | Tatabányai Bányász | 13 |
| 8 | (Hungary) Mihály Borostyán | Vasas SC | 12 |
| 8 | (Hungary) Ferenc Kovács | Csepel SC | 12 |
| 8 | (Hungary) Zsolt Turi | Pécsi MSC | 12 |

== Attendances ==
Average home league attendance top 3:

| # | Club | Average |
|---|---|---|
| 1 | Ferencváros | 18,867 |
| 2 | Győr | 12,667 |
| 3 | Pécs | 10,400 |
