= Volán FC =

Hungarian football club

Volán
- Full name: Volán Football Club
- Founded: 19 December 1966; 59 years ago (as Volán SC); 5 January 1991; 35 years ago (as Volán FC)
- Dissolved: 16 August 1991; 35 years ago
- Ground: Czabán Samu tér
- Capacity: 7,500
- 1990–91: NB I, 16th of 16 (relegated)
Home colours

Volán Football Club was a Hungarian football team from the Rákospalota neighborhood of Budapest, named after one of the main bus companies in the country, Borsod Volán. It played six seasons in the first tier of Hungarian football league system, the Nemzeti Bajnokság I, mostly during the 1980s. During this period, it was relegated four times and never finished higher than 11th place, which it achieved in its first season. After the last relegation in 1991, the club folded.

== History ==
=== Rise through the lower divisions ===
On 19 December 1966, Volán Sport Club was officially founded. The club first competed in the fourth tier of Hungarian football in 1967, finishing first in the North-Central Group of the Nemzeti Bajnokság III that season. The club subsequently progressed through the divisions, winning the North Group of the Nemzeti Bajnokság III unbeaten in spring 1970, and again in the 1970–71 season, securing promotion to the second tier after the latter title. From 1969 to 1976, the club was led by Gyula Grosics, a Hungarian Olympic footballer and member of the "Golden Team", who served as its president.

=== First promotion to the top flight ===
Volán achieved a major milestone in the 1978–79 season by winning the Central Group of the Nemzeti Bajnokság II, securing promotion to the Nemzeti Bajnokság I for the first time in its history. On 29 August 1979, the club achieved its first win in the Hungarian first tier by defeating Békéscsaba 2–1 at home. The club established itself in the top division over the following seasons, finishing 11th in 1979–80, and 14th in 1980–81. However, it was relegated at the end of the 1981–82 season after finishing 16th in the 18-team competition.

=== Repeated promotions and relegations ===
The club demonstrated its ability to move between the top two divisions during the 1980s. It won the NB II in 1982–83 to return to the top flight, finishing 14th in the NB I in 1983–84. After another relegation, Volán won the NB II again in 1984–85 and secured a further promotion. Its return to the top division proved short-lived, as it finished last in 1985–86 and was relegated. The club subsequently spent several seasons in the second tier before winning the Western Group of the NB II in 1989–90, earning promotion to the NB I for the 1990–91 season.

=== Final season and transfer of league participation rights ===
On 5 January 1991, the club was reorganized under the new name Volán Football Club, with Gyula Grosics serving as its honorary president. The newly formed club became the second professional football club in Hungary. Volán's final season in the NB I ended in relegation, with the club finishing 16th and last in the 1990–91 standings. On 16 August 1991, the club's leadership decided to transfer its football department to Ganz Danubius amidst financial difficulties, which would take over the club's place in the NB II, which marked the end of Volán's participation in the football league system under its own football department. Newly refounded Rákospalotai EAC received Ganz Danubius's place in the Budapest MB I. On 7 January 1992, it was announced that Ganz Danubius would no longer continue in the league, instead competing under the name REAC and playing their matches at the Czabán Samu tér.

== Honours ==
=== League ===
- Nemzeti Bajnokság II (level 2)
  - Winners (4): 1978–79, 1982–83, 1984–85, 1989–90
- Nemzeti Bajnokság II (level 3)
  - Winners (2): 1970, 1970–71
- Nemzeti Bajnokság III (level 4)
  - Winners (1): 1967

== Seasons ==
The table below shows the seasons of Volán FC.

Season	Tier	Club's name	Position	Pts
1967	4	Volán SC	1 / 16	43
1968	3	Volán SC	9 / 16	29
1969	3	Volán SC	2 / 16	39
1970	3	Volán SC	1 / 16	29
1970–71	3	Volán SC	1 / 16	45
1971–72	2	Volán SC	9 / 18	33
1972–73	2	Volán SC	16 / 18	27
1973–74	3	Volán SC	2 / 16	49
1974–75	2	Volán SC	3 / 20	46
1975–76	2	Volán SC	6 / 20	45
1976–77	2	Volán SC	5 / 20	44
1977–78	2	Volán SC	7 / 20	40
1978–79	2	Volán SC	1 / 19	51
1979–80	1	Volán SC	11 / 18	33
1980–81	1	Volán SC	14 / 18	27
1981–82	1	Volán SC	16 / 18	21
1982–83	2	Volán SC	1 / 20	49
1983–84	1	Volán SC	14 / 16	24
1984–85	2	Volán SC	1 / 20	55
1985–86	1	Volán SC	16 / 16	22
1986–87	2	Volán SC	3 / 20	46
1987–88	2	Volán SC	7 / 20	41
1988–89	2	Volán SC	4 / 16	52
1989–90	2	Volán SC	1 / 16	65
1990–91	1	Volán SC	16 / 16	21
