= Dunaújváros FC (1952) =

Hungarian football club

- Full name: Dunaújváros Football Club
- Founded: 1952; 74 years ago
- Dissolved: 2009; 17 years ago
- Ground: Dunaferr Arena, Dunaújváros
- Capacity: 12,000
| Home colours | Away colours |

Dunaújváros FC (previously known as Dunaferr SE) was a Hungarian football team from Dunaújváros. Though they won the Hungarian NB I in 1999–2000, recently they played in the second league, until the team withdrew in March 2009, ceasing its operations.

== History ==
The team was founded in 1952 and one year later they were promoted to the Hungarian first division under the name Sztálinvárosi Vasmű Építők. In 1954 they were relegated to the second division and from then on they bounced back and forth between the two. From 1961 the team was known as Dunaújvárosi Kohász SE. Whilst holding this name their best finish was in 1978, 7th in the NB I.

In 1998 they entered the NB I. under the name Dunaferr SE and won their first and only Hungarian championship in 2000. In 2001 they finished 2nd behind Ferencváros . In 2003 they were relegated from the NB I. At this point they had played 20 seasons in the top division. Unfortunately the Dunaferr company ended their support of the men's football team, and in 2004 when the NB I. returned from a 12-team format to a 16-team format they were unable to return and all football operations ended.

Following their championship in 2000, the team qualified for the Second Qualifying Round of the UEFA Champions League 2000-01 where they defeated Hajduk Split 2–0 and 2–2. In the 3rd round, they tied against Rosenborg 2–2 in Hungary, but lost in Norway 1–2, ending their only Champions League run.

The team was resurrected by local Hungarian businessmen József Andics and József Héger and football operations returned. With the league's permission the team began play in the NB I/B (now called NB II). In 2004 they finished 16th, in 2005 5th, and in 2006 13th. The team withdrew from the second league in March 2009, and ceased operations.

== Name changes ==
- Dunapentelei Vasas: August 1951 - = November 1951
- Sztálinvárosi Vasas: 7 November 1951 - October 1956
- Dunapentelei Vasas SK: 1956 - 1957
- Dunapentelei SC: 8 February 1957 - 26 April 1957
- Sztálinvárosi Vasas SC: 26 April 1957 - 19 January 1959
- Sztálinvárosi Kohász: 19 January 1959 - 24 November 1961
- Dunaújvárosi Kohász SE: 24 November 1961 - 20 December 1989
- Dunaferr SE: 20 December 1989 - 2003
- 2003: Dunaferr SE dissolved, the new club purschased the rights of Fóti SE
- Dunaújvárosi FC: 2003 - 2005
- Dunaújvárosi Kohász SE: 2005 - ?
- Dunaújváros FC Prelasti: ? - 2009

== Honours ==
- Nemzeti Bajnokság I
  - Winners (1): 1999–2000
- Nemzeti Bajnokság II
  - Winners (4): 1952 (as Sztálin Vasmű Építők), 1965, 1975–76, 1985–86
  - Runners-up (1): 1987–88
- Nemzeti Bajnokság III:
  - Winners (2): 1982–83, 1983–84

== Seasons ==
The table below shows the seasons of Dunaújváros.

| Season | Tier | Club's name | Position | Pts |
|---|---|---|---|---|
| 1951 | 4 | Dunai Vasmű Gépgyári Vasas | 2 / 6 | |
| 1952 | 3 | Sztálinvárosi Vasas SK | 11 / 14 | 18 |
| 1953 | 3 | Sztálinvárosi Vasas | 10 / 16 | 19 |
| 1954 | 1 | Sztálinvárosi Vasas SK | 14 / 14 | 16 |
| 1954 | 3 | Sztálinvárosi Vasas | 12 / 16 | 14 |
| 1955 | 2 | Sztálinvárosi Vasas | 3 / 16 | 37 |
| 1956 | 2 | Dunapentelei SC (Sztálinvárosi Vasas) | 3 / 16 | 43 |
| 1957–58 | 2 | Sztálinvárosi Vasas | 2 / 19 | 55 |
| 1958–59 | 2 | Sztálinvárosi Kohász | 7 / 16 | 29 |
| 1959–60 | 2 | Sztálinvárosi Kohász SE | 12 / 16 | 26 |
| 1960–61 | 2 | Sztálinvárosi Kohász SE | 6 / 16 | 31 |
| 1961–62 | 2 | Dunaújvárosi Kohász SE | 5 / 16 | 36 |
| 1962–63 | 2 | Dunaújvárosi Kohász SE | 3 / 16 | 39 |
| 1963 | 2 | Dunaújvárosi Kohász SE | 4 / 16 | 19 |
| 1964 | 2 | Dunaújvárosi Kohász SE | 5 / 16 | 32 |
| 1965 | 2 | Dunaújvárosi Kohász SE | 1 / 16 | 42 |
| 1966 | 1 | Dunaújvárosi Kohász SE | 12 / 14 | 17 |
| 1967 | 1 | Dunaújvárosi Kohász SE | 14 / 16 | 25 |
| 1968 | 1 | Dunaújvárosi Kohász SE | 8 / 16 | 27 |
| 1969 | 1 | Dunaújvárosi Kohász SE | 14 / 16 | 23 |
| 1970 | 1 | Dunaújvárosi Kohász SE | 5 / 8 | 12 |
| 1970–71 | 1 | Dunaújvárosi Kohász SE | 15 / 16 | 13+4=17 |
| 1971–72 | 2 | Dunaújvárosi Kohász SE | 6 / 18 | 38 |
| 1972–73 | 2 | Dunaújvárosi Kohász SE | 6 / 18 | 37 |
| 1973–74 | 2 | Dunaújvárosi Kohász SE | 6 / 18 | 36 |
| 1974–75 | 2 | Dunaújvárosi Kohász SE | 7 / 20 | 42 |
| 1975–76 | 2 | Dunaújvárosi Kohász SE | 1 / 20 | 58 |
| 1976–77 | 1 | Dunaújvárosi Kohász SE | 15 / 18 | 27 |
| 1977–78 | 1 | Dunaújvárosi Kohász SE | 7 / 18 | 36 |
| 1978–79 | 1 | Dunaújvárosi Kozász SE | 11 / 18 | 32 |
| 1979–80 | 1 | Dunaújvárosi Kohász SE | 10 / 18 | 33 |
| 1980–81 | 1 | Dunaújvárosi Kohász SE | 18 / 18 | 19 |
| 1981–82 | 2 | Dunaújvárosi Kohász | 6 / 16 | 36 |
| 1982–83 | 3 | Dunaújváros Kohász SE | 1 / 18 | 51 |
| 1983–84 | 3 | Dunaújvárosi Kohász SE | 1 / 18 | 53 |
| 1984–85 | 2 | Dunaújvárosi Kohász | 11 / 20 | 39 |
| 1985–86 | 2 | Dunaújvárosi Kohász | 1 / 20 | 54 |
| 1986–87 | 1 | Dunaújvárosi Kohász SE | 15 / 16 | 17 |
| 1987–88 | 2 | Dunaújvárosi Kohász | 2 / 20 | 48 |
| 1988–89 | 1 | Dunaújvárosi Kohász SE | 16 / 16 | 26 |
| 1989–90 | 2 | Dunaferr SE | 2 / 16 | 57 |
| 1990–91 | 2 | Dunaferr SE | 3 / 16 | 41 |
| 1991–92 | 2 | Dunaferr SE | 4 / 16 | 35 |
| 1992–93 | 2 | Dunaferr SE | 5 / 16 | 34 |
| 1993–94 | 2 | Dunaferr SE | 3 / 16 | 42 |
| 1994–95 | 2 | Dunaferr SE | 8 / 16 | 43 |
| 1995–96 | 2 | Dunaferr SE | 5 / 16 | 51 |
| 1996–97 | 2 | Dunaferr SE | 2 / 16 | 61 |
| 1997–98 | 2 | Dunaferr SE | 2 / 20 | 80 |
| 1998–99 | 1 | Dunaferr SE | 5 / 18 | 57 |
| 1999–00 | 1 | Dunaferr SE | 1 / 18 | 79 |
| 2000 | 1 | Dunaferr SE | 2 / 8 | 29 |
| 2000–01 | 1 | Dunaferr SE | 2 / 12 | 46 |
| 2001–02 | 1 | Dunaferr SE | 4 / 12 | 59 |
| 2001–02 | 1 | Dunaferr SE | 4 / 12 | 53 |
| 2002–03 | 1 | Dunaferr SE | 10 / 12 | 18 |
| 2002–03 | 1 | Dunaferr SE | 12 / 12 | 20 |
| 2003–04 | 2 | Dunaújváros FC | 16 / 18 | 37 |
| 2004–05 | 2 | Dunaújváros FC | 5 / 14 | 36 |
| 2005–06 | 2 | Dunaújvárosi Kohász | 13 / 16 | 31 |
| 2006–07 | 2 | Dunaújváros FC | 6 / 16 | 46 |
| 2007–08 | 2 | Dunaújvárosi Kohász SE | 9 / 16 | 38 |
| 2008–09 | 2 | Dunaújváros FC Prelasti | 16 / 16 | 13 |

== UEFA Cup ==
| Season | Competition | Round | Country | Club | Home | Away | Aggregate |
|---|---|---|---|---|---|---|---|
| 2000–01 | UEFA Cup | 1. Round | (Netherlands) | Feyenoord Rotterdam | 0–1 | 1–3 | 1–4 |
| 2001–02 | UEFA Cup | Qualifying Round | (Cyprus) | Olympiakos Nicosia | 2–4 | 2–2 | 4–6 |

== UEFA Champions League ==
| Season | Competition | Round | Country | Club | Home | Away | Aggregate |
|---|---|---|---|---|---|---|---|
| 2000–01 | UEFA Champions League | 2. Qualifying Round | (Croatia) | HNK Hajduk Split | 2–2 | 2–0 | 4–2 |
| | | 3. Qualifying Round | (Norway) | Rosenborg | 2–2 | 1–2 | 3–4 |
