= Péter Hannich =

Hungarian footballer

Personal information
- Date of birth: 30 March 1957 (age 69)
- Place of birth: Győr, Hungary
- Height: 1.77 m (5 ft 10 in)
- Position: Attacking midfielder

Senior career*
Years	Team	Apps	(Gls)
1975–1977	Győri MÁV DAC		
1977–1986	Győri ETO FC	231	(116)
1986–1987	Nancy	14	(1)
1987–1988	Győri ETO FC	10	(2)
1988–1991	MTK Budapest	61	(9)
1991–1992	SV Mattersburg		

International career
1982–1987	Hungary	25	(2)

Managerial career
- 1992–1994: SV Mattersburg
- 1994–1995: Győri ETO FC (assistant)
- 1997–1998: Motim TE
- 1999–2000: Pápai ELC
- 2001: Győri ETO FC (assistant)
- 2001–2002: Eger SE
- 2002–2003: Veszprém LC
- 2004–2005: Ácsi Kinizsi
- 2005–2008: Gyirmót FC
- 2008–2010: Mosonmagyaróvári TE
- 2010–2015: Rába ETO Futsal Club (sport director)
- 2015–2016: Csornai SE
- 2017–2018: Gyirmót FC
- 2019: Gyirmót FC
- * Club domestic league appearances and goals

Péter Hannich (born 30 March 1957) is a Hungarian football manager and former international footballer who played as an attacking midfielder.

== Club career ==
Born in Győr, Hannich played for Győri ETO FC in the 1980s, winning two Hungarian championships in 1982 and 1983. He was the league's top scorer with 22 goals in the 1981–82 season. He later moved to AS Nancy, playing 14 matches and scoring 1 goal in the 1986–87 season.

== International career ==
Hannich debuted for the Hungary national team on 18 April 1982 against Peru, and earned a total of 27 caps and scored 2 goals, and took part in the 1986 FIFA World Cup.
