= Csepel SC =

Hungarian sports club

- Founded: 1912; 114 years ago
- Ground: Béke téri Stadion, Csepel
- Capacity: 10,000
- Manager: Krisztián Gabala
- League: Nemzeti Bajnokság III
- 2025–26: NB III (Dél-Kelet), 6th of 16
Home colours	Away colours

Csepel SC (Hungarian: [ˈt͡ʃɛpɛl]) is a Hungarian sports club based in Csepel, the XXI district of Budapest, which is on an island in the Danube in the south of the city. The club was formed in 1912 as Csepeli Torna Klub ("gymnastics club").

== The Csepel SC football department ==
Csepel SC have won the Hungarian football championship four times. They became champions of the following seasons; 1941–42, 1942–43, 1947–48 and 1958–59.

The football department of the club was dissolved after the 2001–02 season. The team then played in the second division. Its homeground is the Béke téri Stadion, which has a capacity of 12.000.

Until its relegation at the end of the 1996–97 season Csepel SC spent 51 seasons in the first division and remains to-date (2007), eighth in the all-time table of the first division.

=== History of Csepel SC ===
In its only participation in European Champions' Cup (in 1960) Csepel SC was eliminated in the qualification round by Fenerbahçe SK of Istanbul. In 1981 Csepel was runner-up in the Mitropa Cup behind Tatran Presov. The last notable success was fourth place in the national league in 1982–83.

In 2000 the football department of the club was merged with the first team of the second division club III. Kerületi TVE from Óbuda in the III. district in the north of Budapest. The joint team played for the next two seasons under the name of Csepel SC in Csepel. The junior teams remained separated.

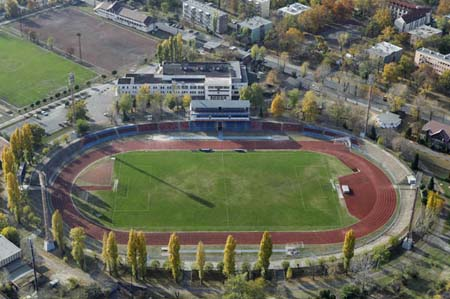
Béke téri Stadion

At the end of the 2001/02 season the football department of Csepel SC was dissolved. Beginning with the season 2003/04 the former partners from Óbuda resumed senior football under the name of III. Kerületi TUE and commenced activities with many players from former teams and its own youth in the fourth division. In that year the team remained undefeated and was promoted to the third division (NBIII), where it is still playing today (2007–08).

Of importance, currently, are the volleyball, wrestling, and cycling departments of the club. Also the handball and boxing sections are of historic significance.

=== UEFA Champions League ===
Season	Competition	Round	Country	Club	Home	Away	Aggregate
1959–60	European Cup	Preliminary Round	(Turkey)	Fenerbahçe SK	2–3	1–1	3–4

=== Record by country of opposition ===
- Correct as of 5 July 2010

Country	Pld	W	D	L	GF	GA	GD	Win%
Turkey	2	0	1	1	3	4	−1	0.00
Totals	2	0	1	1	3	4	–1	0.00

P – Played; W – Won; D – Drawn; L – Lost

=== Naming history ===
- 1912 – Csepeli TK
- 1932 – Csepel FC
- 1937 – Weisz-Manfréd FC Csepel
- 1944 – Csepel SC
- 1947 – Csepeli Mukás TE
- 1950 – Csepeli Vasas
- 1958 – Csepeli SC
- 1993 – Csepel SC-Kordax
- 1996 – Csepel SC
- 2004 – Csepel FC

== Honours ==
- Nemzeti Bajnokság II:
  - Winners (5): 1939–40, 1962–63, 1979–80, 1988–89, 1991–92

== The Csepel SC basketball department ==
The basketball department of Csepel SC had its glory days at the decades of '70s and '80s where it won all its domestic titles and participated almost every year in the European competitions.

=== Honours ===
Total Titles: 8

==== Domestic competitions ====
- Hungarian Championship
  - Winners (3): 1972, 1973, 1989
- Hungarian Cup
  - Winners (5): 1971, 1974, 1976, 1984, 1985

== Seasons ==
The table below shows the seasons of Csepel SC.

As of 20 October 2026.

Season	Tier	Club's name	Position	Pts
1912–13	4	Csepeli TK	4 / 12	28
1913–14	2	Csepeli TK	7 / 9	
1917–18	3	Csepeli TK	5 / 8	5
1923–24	3	Csepeli TK	2 / 8	22
1924–25	3	Csepeli TK	3 / 9	11
1925–26	3	Csepeli TK	2 / 10	21
1926–27	4	Csepeli TK	3 / 13	36
1927–28	4	Csepeli TK	2 / 17	54
1928–29	4	Csepeli TK	1 / 16	47
1929–30	3	Csepeli TK	13 / 15	23
1930–31	4	Csepeli TK	5 / 15	32
1931–32	4	Csepeli TK	3 / 16	46
1932–33	2	Csepel FC	8 / 14	25
1933–34	2	Csepel FC	9 / 14	22
1934–35	2	Csepel FC	10 / 13	17
1935–36	2	Csepel FC	3 / 14	36
1936–37	2	Csepel FC	2 / 12	34
1937–38	2	Csepel FC	2 / 14	42
1938–39	2	Weisz Manfréd FC	2 / 14	43
1939–40	2	Weisz Manfréd FC	1 / 12	37
1940–41	1	Weisz Manfréd FC	5 / 14	30
1941–42	1	Weisz Manfréd FC Csepel	1 / 16	48
1942–43	1	Weisz Manfréd FC Csepel	1 / 16	45
1943–44	1	Csepel FC	9 / 16	29
1944–45	1	Csepel FC	3 / 12	14
1944–45	1	Csepel FC	11 / 16	3
1945	1	Csepeli MTK	3 / 12	32
1945–46	1	Csepeli MTK	2 / 14	37
1945–46	1	Csepeli MTK	3 / 10	20
1946–47	1	Csepeli MTK	6 / 16	31
1947–48	1	Csepeli MTK	1 / 17	52
1948–49	1	Csepeli MTK	5 / 16	35
1949–50	1	Csepeli Vasas TK	4 / 16	38
1950	1	Csepeli Vasas TK	4 / 16	18
1951	1	Csepeli Vasas	5 / 14	29
1952	1	Csepeli Vasas	5 / 14	25
1953	1	Csepeli Vasas SK	11 / 14	20
1954	1	Csepeli Vasas SK	12 / 14	22
1955	1	Csepeli Vasas SK	9 / 14	22
1956	1	Csepeli Vasas	6 / 12	23
1957	1	Csepel SC	5 / 12	13
1957–58	1	Csepel SC	10 / 14	25
1958–59	1	Csepel SC	1 / 14	34
1959–60	1	Csepel SC	12 / 14	20
1960–61	1	Csepel SC	10 / 14	22
1961–62	1	Csepel SC	14 / 14	16
1962–63	2	Csepel SC	1 / 16	51
1963	1	Csepel SC	8 / 14	13
1964	1	Csepel SC	9 / 14	20
1965	1	Csepel SC	10 / 14	22
1966	1	Csepel SC	8 / 14	27
1967	1	Csepel SC	8 / 16	28
1968	1	Csepel SC	5 / 16	34
1969	1	Csepel SC	7 / 16	32
1970	1	Csepel SC	3 / 8	17
1970–71	1	Csepel SC	6 / 16	32+6=38
1971–72	1	Csepel SC	9 / 16	30
1972–73	1	Csepel SC	7 / 16	31
1973–74	1	Csepel SC	11 / 16	27
1974–75	1	Csepel SC	4 / 16	31
1975–76	1	Csepel SC	12 / 16	25
1976–77	1	Csepel SC	16 / 18	26
1977–78	1	Csepel SC	11 / 18	30
1978–79	1	Csepel SC	16 / 18	25
1979–80	2	Csepel SC	1 / 20	62
1980–81	1	Csepel SC	12 / 18	27
1981–82	1	Csepel SC	7 / 18	36
1982–83	1	Csepel SC	4 / 16	37
1983–84	1	Csepel SC	11 / 16	27
1984–85	1	Csepel SC	7 / 16	30
1985–86	1	Csepel SC	15 / 16	22
1986–87	2	Csepel SC	4 / 20	46
1987–88	2	Csepel SC	8 / 20	41
1988–89	2	Csepel SC	1 / 16	62
1989–90	1	Csepel SC	16 / 16	25
1990–91	2	Csepel SC	3 / 16	41
1991–92	2	Csepel SC	1 / 16	42
1992–93	1	Csepel-Kordax	7 / 16	30
1993–94	1	Csepel-Kordax	8 / 16	32
1994–95	1	Csepel-Kordax	12 / 16	35
1995–96	1	Csepel SC	8 / 16	42
1996–97	1	Csepel SC	18 / 18	25
1997–98	2	Csepel SC	20 / 20	27
1998–99	3	Csepel Austromobilar FC	2 / 16	44
1999–00	2	Csepel SC	20 / 20	14
2000	2	Csepel-Auto Trader	3 / 7	21
2000–01	2	Csepel-Auto Trader	7 / 12	28
2001–02	2	Csepel-AT.	4 / 12	51
2001–02	2	Csepel SC	5 / 12	34
2006–07	4	Láng SK-Csepel	1 / 18	86
2007–08	3	Csepel FC	8 / 16	43
2008–09	3	Csepel FC	9 / 16	37
2009–10	3	Csepel FC	7 / 14	35
2010–11	3	Csepel FC	6 / 15	47
2011–12	3	Indotek Csepel FC	8 / 16	43
2012–13	3	Indotek Csepel FC	6 / 15	46
2013–14	3	Sportbusz Csepel FC	6 / 16	48
2014–15	3	Csepel FC	13 / 16	26
2015–16	3	Csepel FC	14 / 17	26
2016–17	3	Csepel FC	9 / 18	44
2017–18	3	Csepel FC	9 / 16	42
2018–19	3	Csepel FC	15 / 16	30
2019–20	4	Csepel FC	2 / 16	45
2020–21	4	Csepel FC	2 / 16	74
2021–22	4	Csepel FC	2 / 16	76
2022–23	4	Csepel-Csep-Gól FC	3 / 16	67
2023–24	4	Csepel TC	1 / 16	83
2024–25	3	Csepel SC	10 / 16	29
2025–26	3	Csepel SC	6 / 16	49

== Important athletes ==
The club has bred Olympic champions including András Balczó, Tibor Berczelly, Aladár Gerevich, Károly Fatér, and Bertalan Papp.

- Laszlo Klauz, Wrestling, 1980s, runner-up at the 1989 world championship (Greco-Roman, super-heavyweight), eight national championships.
- György Kolonics, Canoe racing, 1991 – 2007, Two Olympic gold and two bronze in C2 and C1 with György Kozmann and Csaba Horváth, fifteen gold medals at World Championships.
- Ferenc Németh, Pentathlon, 1954-1960s, Two gold medals (individual and team) at the 1960 Olympics.
- György Pásztor, ice hockey player and Officer of the Order of Merit of the Republic of Hungary
