= Ferencvárosi TC–Újpest FC rivalry =

Association football rivalry in Budapest, Hungary

A Derbi
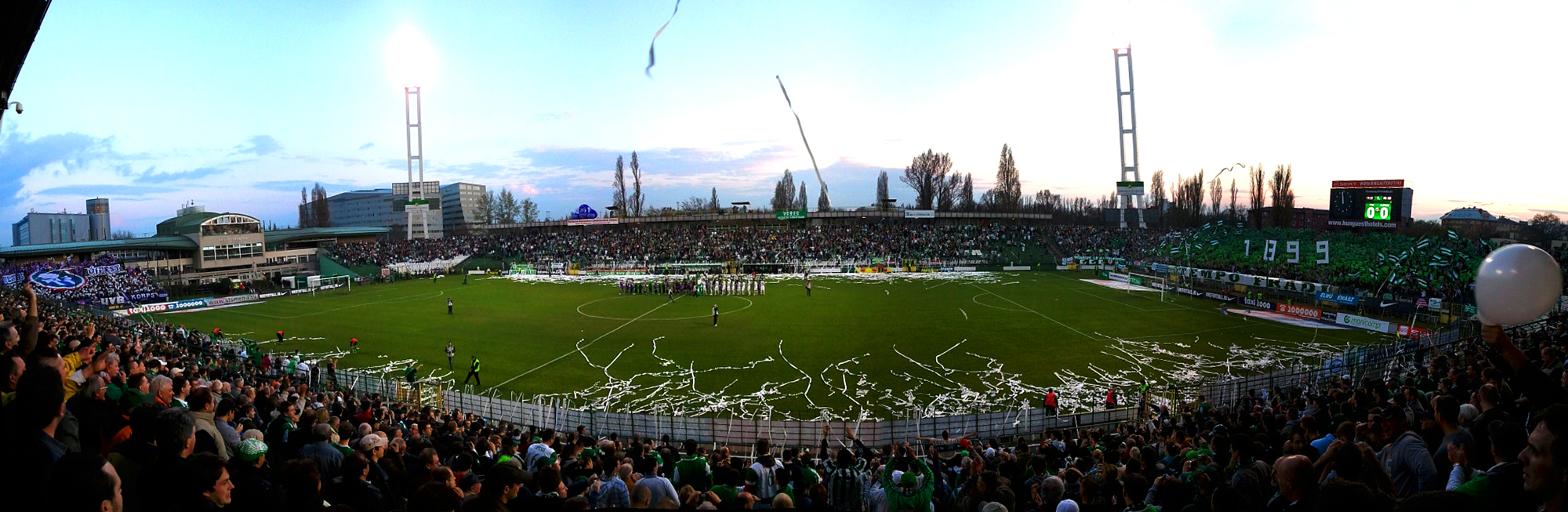
- 206th Ferencváros–Újpest derby on 1 April 2011 in Albert Stadion
- Native name: Ferencváros vs. Újpest
- Other names: Fradi–Újpest derbi
- Sport: Association football
- Location: Budapest, Hungary
- Teams: Ferencvárosi Torna Club; Újpest Football Club
- First meeting: 19 February 1905 (Ferencváros 2–0 Újpest)
- Latest meeting: 3 May 2026 (Újpest 0–5 Ferencváros)
- Next meeting: 5 September 2026
- Broadcasters: Magyar Televízió and M4 Sport
- Stadiums: Újpest: Szusza Ferenc Stadion; Ferencváros: Groupama Aréna (Most attendances: 85,000 at 17 July 1964, Népstadion)

Statistics
- Total meetings: Total: 303; League: 248
- All-time record: 11 goals, Ferencváros 3–8 Újpest (15 May 1976)
- All-time series (Nemzeti Bajnokság I only): League: Ferencváros (123); Újpest (61)
- Largest victory: Ferencváros 8–1 Újpest (21 May 1950)
- Longest win streak: 17, Ferencváros (4 May 2019–17 August 2024)

The fixture between Ferencvárosi TC and Újpest FC is a local derby in Budapest, Hungary. It is arguably the most fierce rivalry in the country, and one of the most fierce in Eastern Europe. It is usually referred to as The Derbi, deriving from the English word derby. It was first contested in 1905, and was given its current name in March 1930, after the clash of Ferencváros and Újpest was referred to as "Derbi", reflecting the ferocity of the match-up, which ended 1-1.

Initially less important than the Örökrangadó, the Derbi surpassed the prominence of Ferencváros and MTK's clash during the 1940s and 1950s, due to MTK disbanding for a brief period of time, and Újpest becoming a worthy challenger of Ferencváros, as they won eight national titles between 1930 and 1947.

These clubs are among the most popular and successful clubs in the country. Ferencváros are the most decorated club in Hungary, having won a record 36 national championships and every single league title since the 2018/19 season. Újpest are 20-time champions of Hungary, coming in third behind MTK and Ferencváros in terms of all-time league titles won, but have been unable to claim a national championship since 1998.

The clubs have met 243 times in the top-flight; Ferencváros have won 119 games while Újpest have won 61.

Both clubs are named after the areas in the city they play in: Ferencváros play in the 9th district, Ferencváros, just south of the city centre and Újpest play in the 4th district of Újpest, to the north of the city. Ferencváros is also known as Fradi and FTC, while Újpest is also known as Dózsa and UTE.

Traditionally, MTK were Ferencváros' main rival, with both clubs dominating early Hungarian football. Once Újpest turned professional in the mid-1920s they became a successful side, totally dominating the league in the 1930s and 1970s.

On match days, police are often present to defend the public from the aggressive supporters of the two clubs. Therefore, Line 3 of the Budapest Metro is controlled by the police and special carriages are provided before and after the match. The purple-white supporters of Újpest FC get on at the Újpest–Központ metro station, which is the closest metro station to the Szusza Ferenc Stadium. They get off at the Népliget metro station which is next to the Albert Stadion. The journey usually ends in fights and vandalism, with clashes between fans of Újpest and fans of Ferencváros, and/or the police.

== History and rivalry ==
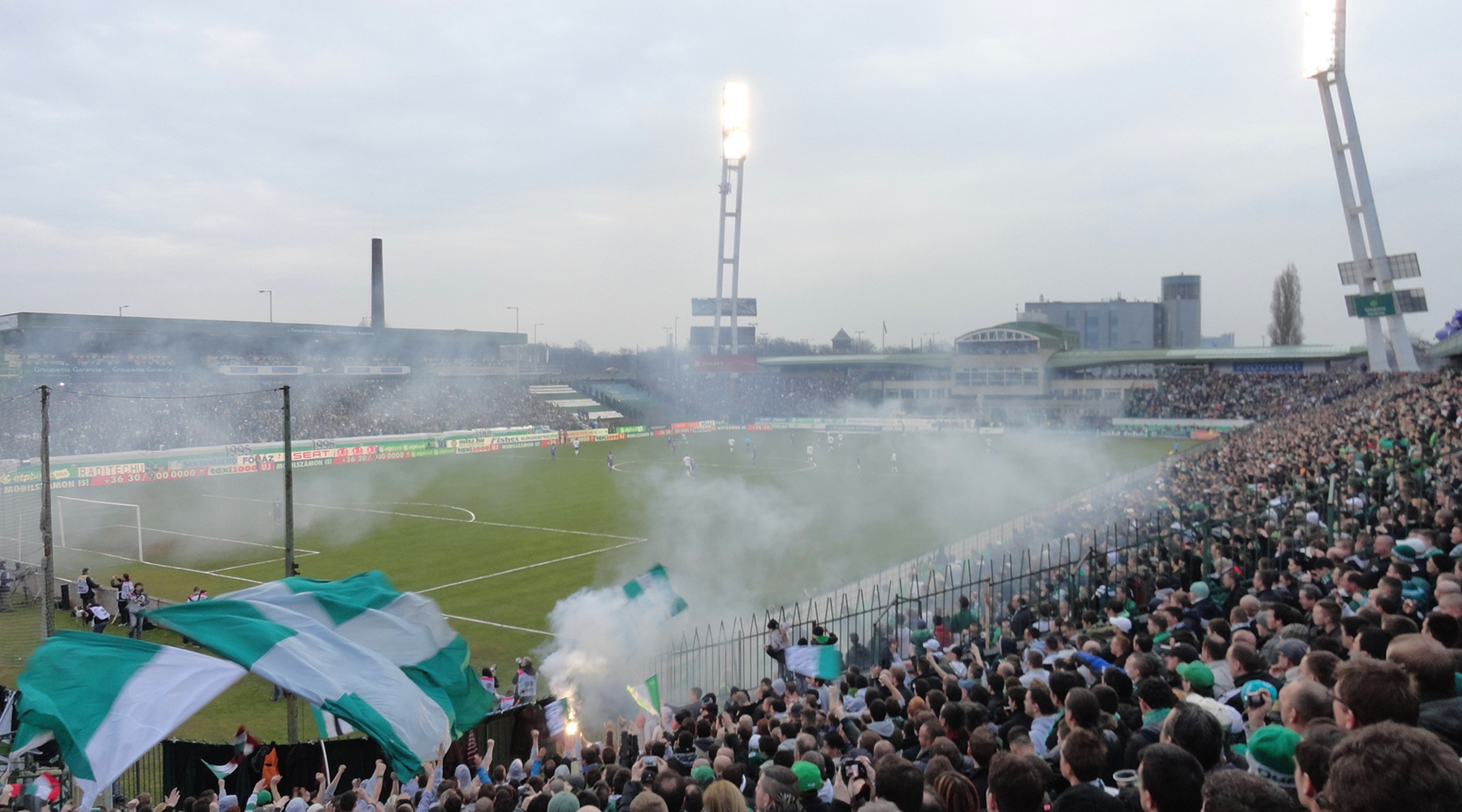
Ferencváros–Újpest at the demolished Albert Stadion

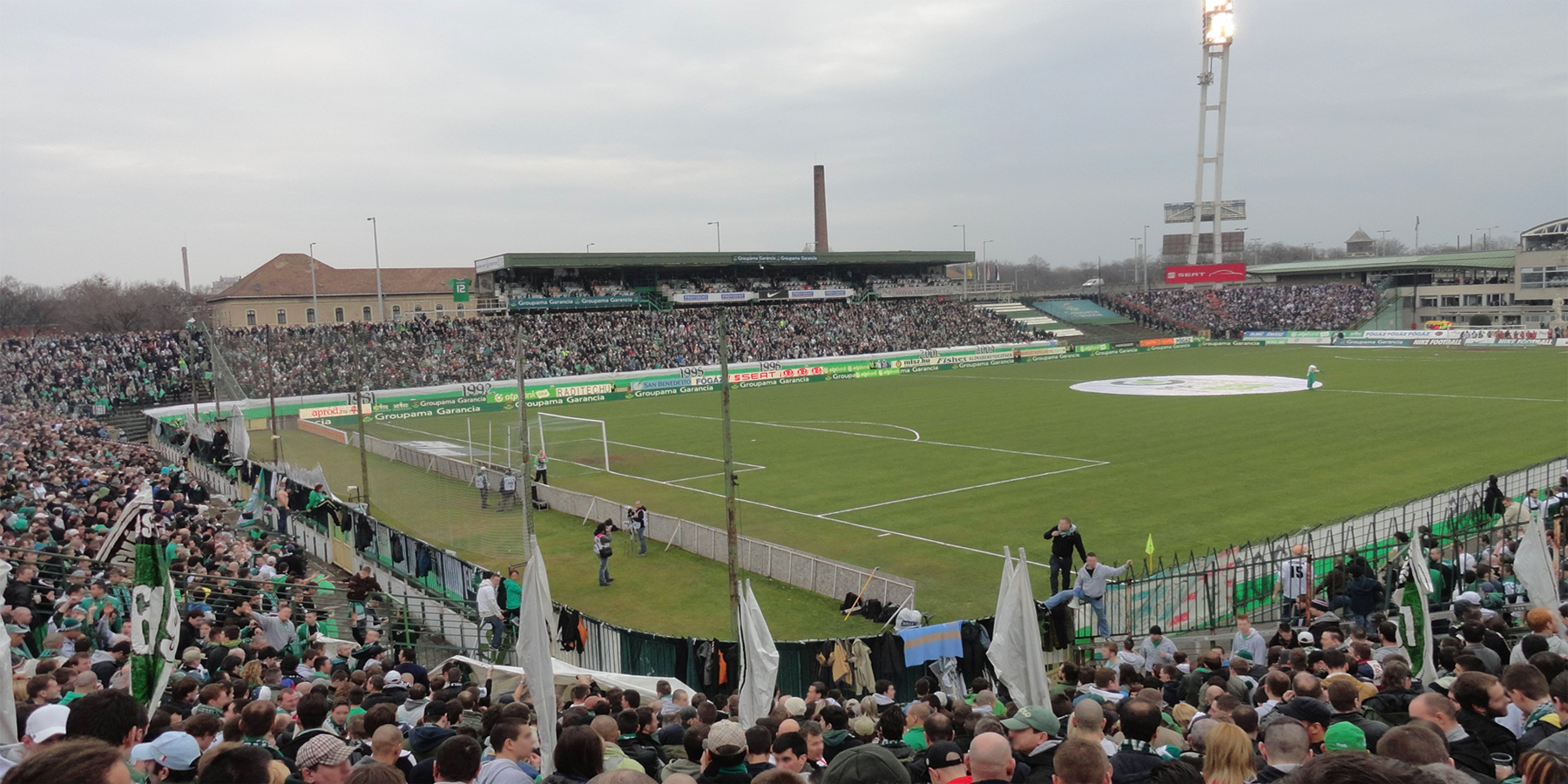
Ferencváros–Újpest in 2013

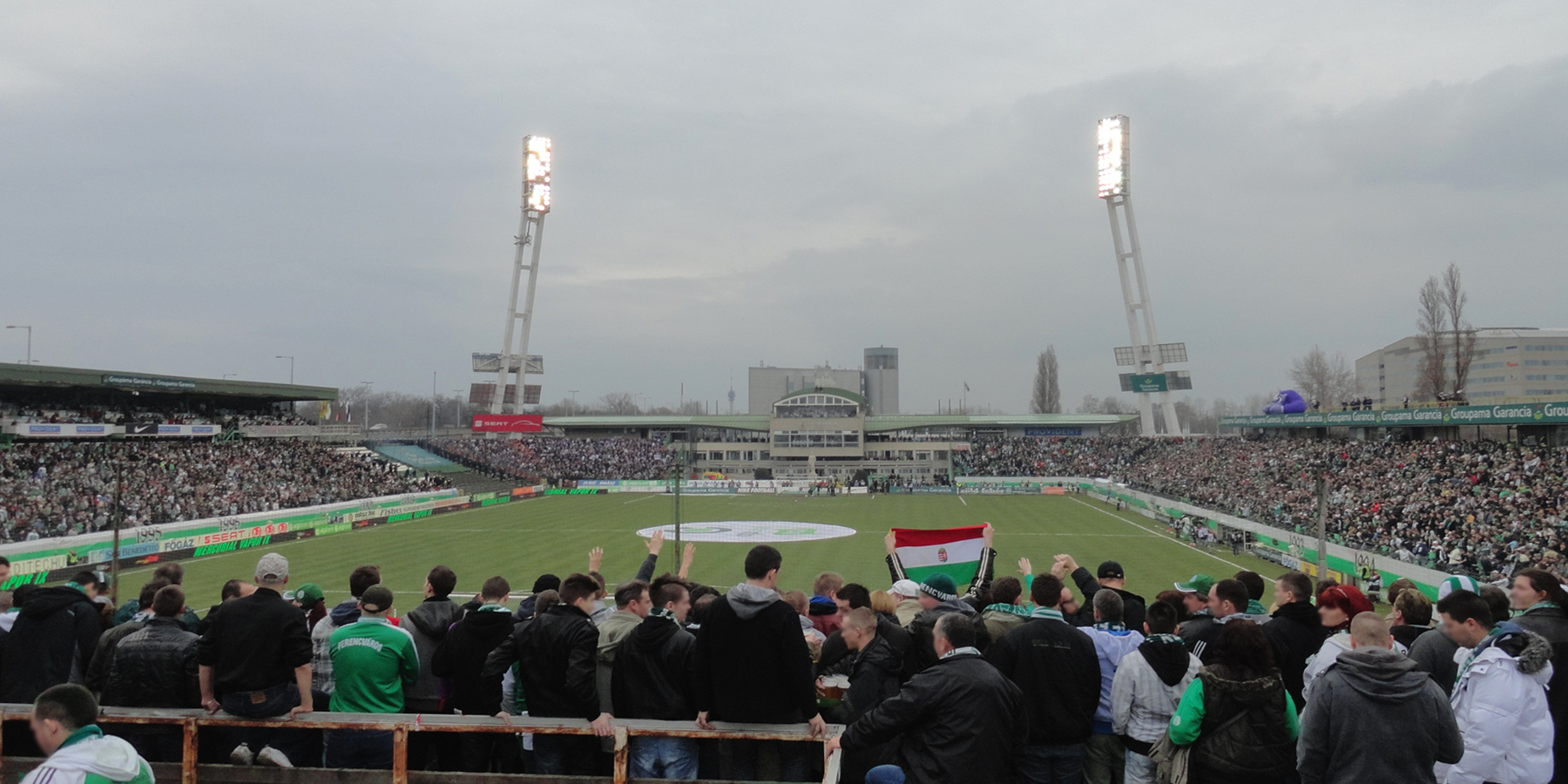
Ferencváros–Újpest in 2013

=== 1905-1930: Early years ===
The first match between Ferencváros and Újpest was played on 19 February 1905, at the Sorkosári Úti Stadion in the 1905 Hungarian League season. The match ended with a 2–0 victory for Ferencváros. The two goals were scored by Ferenc Weisz. The return match was also won by Ferencváros 3–1. The first and only Újpest goal was scored by Béla Petz. Ferencváros won their second league title at the end of the season, and would go on to dominate the league for the following 25 years. Ferencváros also won the 1907, 1909, 1910, 1911, 1912 and 1913 campaigns.

Until 1917, Ferencváros had won all 15 Derbies, often with heavy blow-out victories, such as 5-0 and 6-0 in 1907, and had won consecutive 6-2 victories in 1909, consecutive 7-1 victories in the 1910/11 season, and successive 5-1 victories in 1912 and 1913. Újpest's first victory over Ferencváros happened in June 1917, as UTE defeated Ferenczvárosi TC (they used a Z in their name until 1926) 4-1 at Amerika-Út, in the 14th District. Both of the Fogl brothers, who each spent 20 years playing for Újpest, scored during the game.

In 1927, Ferencváros clinched the title, finishing 7 points above Újpest. The campaign's second derby, played at Üllői Út, was an especially violent affair, as the game featured four red cards. Ferencváros won the Derbi 2-1, with a brace from Miklós Dán, who himself did not remain on the pitch until the final whistle. Dán was given a red card in the 86th minute of the game.

In 1928 Ferencváros won their 11th title.

=== 1930-1945: Emergence of Újpest, development of the rivalry ===
The rivalry can be traced back to the 1930s, when Újpest won their first Hungarian League title, under head coach Lajos Bányai, two points above Ferencváros. Ferencváros was the only team to get a win at Újpesti Stadion that season, as they defeated UTE 2-1, with an 88 minute winner from Szedlacsik.

Újpest managed to successfully defend their title the following season. In April 1931, Újpest recorded their first win over Ferencváros in five years, as they defeated Ferencváros 3-1, with István Avar scoring a brace. 25,000 people attended the game at UTE-Stadion.

In 1932, Ferencváros achieved a 100% win record with coach Zoltán Blum, winning all 22 of their games and outscoring their opponents 105 to 18. Újpest finished runners-up. In game 19 of the 1931/32 season, Ferencváros shut out Újpest 5-0 at Megyeri Út, becoming the first team to score five goals at Megyeri Út in a league game since MTK in April 1918. József Takács and Géza Toldi both scored a brace.

In 1933, Újpest won their third national championship, finishing two points above their 9th district rivals, and 1 point above MTK. FTC, UTE and MTK were embroiled in a 3-way title race for almost the entire season. Ferencváros' title hopes blew up, when Újpest defeated them 1-0 on May 14, with a goal from Pál Jávor.

In January 1938, Újpest defeated Ferencváros 4-2, and handed Ferencváros their first league defeat since March 1937. The result also meant that Ferencváros' 14 consecutive game winning streak came to an end. FTC ended up winning the league, finishing three points above Újpest.

In October 1938, Ferencváros defeated Újpest 3–1 in a tense derby at Üllői Út. The game featured three red cards, as Újpest finished the game with nine men. This was Újpest's only away defeat of the season, as they won another league title in 1939. In April, the Megyeri Úti Stadion's crowd witnessed an exciting derby, containing six goals. Újpest's Sándor Ádám and Ferencváros' István Kiszely both scored a brace and the Derbi ended 3-3.

In December 1939, Újpest beat FTC 1-0 in the 9th district, while also overcoming them 4-1 in March 1940. Ultimately, however, Ferencváros claimed another league title, finishing one point above third place Újpest. The 4th district team was the only team to beat FTC twice.

The following season, Ferencváros defended their championship, overtaking MTK in the number of league titles with their 13th win. Ferencváros finished 12 points above runners-up Újpest. FTC won a "double" over their rivals in the derby, winning 5-0 at Megyeri Út in November 1949, and 5-2 in March 1941. György Sárosi scored a hat-trick in the first game, while Károly Finta found the net three times during the latter encounter.

In November 1941, Újpest defeated Ferencváros 6-2 at Megyeri Út. Újpest legend Ferenc Szusza scored a brace.

In December 1942, the clubs played a 9-goal thriller at Megyeri Út. Although FTC took the lead within 120 seconds, Újpest were ahead by the 19th minute thanks to a quick brace from Mihály Nagymarosi. Before half-time, the visitors scored two unanswered goals, making the score 2-3. Ten minutes into the second half, Ferencváros extended their lead to two goals, thanks to Béla Sárosi's second goal of the day. The 10-man FTC eventually won the game 4-5.

The October 1944 clash was interrupted due to an air raid alert. The score was 1-1 at the time of the interruption.

=== 1945-1962: Political division ===
In July 1945, Újpest defeated Ferencváros in the first Derbi of post-WW2 Hungary. Újpest won the game 3-2, with Gyula Zsengellér scoring a brace within 13 minutes.

In 1947, Újpest won the first full season of the post-war era, finishing five points above Kispest, and nine points above Ferencváros, who finished fourth. Újpest scored 106 goals in 30 games.

In October 1947, Újpest hammered Ferencváros 5-1. Károly Bódis scored a hat-trick.

In December 1948, Ferencváros overcame Újpest 5-3 at Megyeri Road. Ferenc Deák scored a hat-trick in what was UTE's second defeat in the past 12 months in the 4th district.

In May 1949, Újpest managed to seek revenge, beating Ferencváros 5-0 at Üllői Út. This was Ferencváros' first home defeat since August 1947, bringing almost two years of invincibility to an end.

At the end of the 1948/49 season, Ferencváros claimed their first national title in eight years, finishing 11 points above MTK. Ferencváros won 26 fixtures, and scored 140 goals through 30 games.

In September 1949, Ferencváros defeated Újpest 4-1 at Megyeri Út. Sándor Kocsis scored a brace.

In May 1950, FTC hammered Újpest 8-1, their highest scoring victory in the history of the Derby. Zoltán Czibor and Sándor Kocsis both scored a hat-trick. At the end of the season, Ferencváros finished second, four points off first-time champions Honvéd, while Újpest finished fifth.

In the summer of 1950, Ferenc Deák, 3-time NB1 top scorer, was forced to sign for Újpesti Dózsa directly from Ferencváros. He was overheard singing the Ferencváros anthem (which was banned at the time) at a pub, resulting in a physical altercation between him and an ÁVH officer. Deák had to choose between a prison sentence, or signing for Újpest. The first derby to feature him playing for Újpest took place in December 1950, and Deák was the sole goal scorer of the match, as Újpest won 1-0 in front of 20,000 people.

The city of Újpest became part of Budapest in 1950. Therefore, the rivalry was partially based on a city-rural contrast. The supporters of Ferencváros were Germans in Hungary and city-dwellers, while the supporters of Újpest were Hungarians, Germans, and Jews in Hungary. In the 1950s, Ferencváros became the team of the opposition, while Újpest were forced to become the team of the Ministry of Interior. Therefore, Ferencváros fans considered Újpest to be Soviet invaders.

In April 1951, Ferencváros beat Újpest 2-1, thanks to a brace from Tibor Csoknai. 32,000 people attended the game at Üllői Sporttelep. At the end of the season Újpest finished third, while FTC finished sixth.

In April 1952, Ferencváros and Újpest played a memorable 3-3 draw in front of 37,000 spectators. Ferenc Szusza and Tibor Csoknai both scored a brace. At the end of the campaign, Dózsa retained their bronze medal, while Ferencváros slipped to a ninth place finish.

In November 1952, Újpest scored their first victory against FTC in over two years, defeating Ferencváros 1-0 in the 4th district.

In April 1953, the Derby featured eight goals, as Újpest defeated Ferencváros 5-3, achieving their first victory in the 9th district in four years.

At the end of the 1953 season, Újpest and Ferencváros finished on an equal amount of points, both collecting 30 points. Due to their better goal difference, UTE finished first position above the fifth placed FTC.

In May 1954, the two teams contested the first Derby held at the Népstadion, in front of 55,000 spectators. The game ended 1-1.

In September 1954, Újpest defeated Ferencváros 4-1. Gusztáv Aspirány scored a brace. At the end of the season, Ferencváros finished third, seven points above UTE, who achieved a fifth place finish.

In June 1955, Újpest defeated Ferencváros 4-0 in front of a 70,000 crowd at Népstadion. Ferenc Szusza scored a hat-trick.

In the return fixture in November, Ferencváros managed to avenge their earlier loss, defeating Újpest 3-2. Pál Orosz scored a brace within 20 minutes. At the end of the season, Ferencváros retained their third place, while Újpest slipped to their lowest league finish since 1914, achieving eighth place.

In July 1956, Ferencváros contested their last Derbi under the name of Budapest Kinizsi. The game ended 1-1. Due to the events of the 1956 Hungarian Revolution, the league campaign was discontinued, and no champion was declared. Újpest were second place at the time of the season's suspension, 3 points behind Honvéd, while Ferenvváros were placed fourth, two points below Ferencváros.

In May 1957, the first Derbi of the Kádár-era was held. Újpest defeated Ferencváros 2-1 at the Népstadion, with a brace from Gusztáv Aspirány.

In the 1957 spring season, Újpest finished third, one point above fourth place Ferencváros.

In June 1958, Újpest thrashed Ferencváros 4-1 at the Népstadion, with Szusza, Göröcs, Borsányi and Nagy all getting on the scoresheet.

At the end of the 1957/58 season, FTC finished third, while Újpesti Dózsa finished seventh.

In September 1958, Ferencváros avenged their previous Derbi loss, demolishing Újpest 4-2. Miklós Borsos scored a brace in 26 minutes in front of 30,000 spectators at the Népstadion.

In July 1959, the teams played a 7-goal thriller on the penultimate day of the season. Újpest bested Ferencváros 4-3, with János Göröcs and Flórián Albert both scoring braces. At the end of the 1958/59 campaign, Újpest finished fifth, three points above Ferencváros.

In 1960, Újpest ended their 13-year long league title drought, finishing five points above runners up Ferencváros. Ferencváros won the first Derbi of the season 1-0, with Pál Orosz being the sole goal scorer. Újpest took revenge and defeated their biggest rivals on the penultimate day of the season, in front of 75,000 people at the Népstadion. Újpest won 1–0 with a goal from Ferenc Szusza.

In 1961, Újpest came close to retaining their title, but ended up four points short off of Vasas, while Ferencváros finished fourth. Despite finishing lower in the league than their 4th district counter-parts, this was the first season since 1950 that Ferencváros defeated Újpest twice. Fradi defeated Újpest 2–0 in September 1960 and April 1961. The following season Újpest sought revenge, as they recorded two victories over FTC in a single season, defeating their biggest rivals 2–1 in September 1961 and February 1962. Újpest finished second, while FTC achieved a third-place finish.

=== 1962-1969: 20-star Ferencváros ===
In August 1962, the clubs played an exciting 2–2 draw, where Flórián Albert scored a brace in 26 minutes.

In 1963, FTC who won their first league title since 1949, finishing six points above MTK, and seven points above Újpest.

In July 1964, Újpest beat Ferencváros 4‐2 in the highest ever attended game between the two, with 85,000 people cramming into the Népstadion. Regardless, Ferencváros won the league, and retained their title, while Újpest had to be satisfied with a fifth-place finish.

By 1965, the gap between the two clubs was greatly reduced, as Ferencváros finished runners up only three points above UTE, and suffered a 2–0 loss in October, thanks to a brace from Béla Kuharszki. Ferencváros became the first Hungarian team to win a continental cup, winning the 1965 cup of fair-trade cities. Újpest would attempt to recreate this feat in 1969, but ultimately lost in the final against Newcastle United.

In 1966, the two teams' flare was put on full display, as the two games they played against each other during the season featured a combined 15 goals. In May, FTC decimated UTE 5–2 at the Népstadion, in front of 65,000 people. The second game ended 5–3 to Ferencváros. The two games featured 9 different goal scorers. Ferencváros finished second, five points above fourth placed Újpest.

In 1967, Ferencváros won their 20th national title, finishing eight points above Újpest. In the 28th round, the two teams met in a crucial derby for the title, at Népstadion. The game ended 3-3. 1967-es magyar labdarúgó-bajnokság (első osztály)

In 1968, the two clubs were separated by a single point, as Ferencváros retained their title, and Újpest finished second. The clubs drew with each other twice that season.

=== 1969-1980: The Magical Újpest era ===
1969 would be the start of the Magical Újpest era, with Újpest winning the national championship seven consecutive times. In 1969, Újpest won both the league and the Hungarian cup. In May 1969, Újpest defeated FTC for the first time in 4 years, with Antal Dunai and Ferenc Bene both scoring in front of the 45,000 Népstadion spectators.

In 1970, Újpest retained their title, with Ferencváros finishing second in the regular season. The two teams played each other over a two-legged tie to decide the champions. Újpest won the first game at Megyeri Road 3-2, with Antal Dunai scoring the decisive goal in the 89th minute. The second leg ended 1–1 at the Népstadion, and Újpest defended their title for the first time since 1947.

In 1971, Újpest completed their second three-peat of the post-war era, finishing two points above Ferencváros. In May 1971, Ferencváros defeated Újpest in the league for the first time in nearly 5 years, after an 88 minute goal from István Szőke. This was Ferencváros' first ever victory at Megyeri Road, and was also Újpest's only home defeat throughout the season.

In 1972, Újpest won their fourth straight national title, after winning the league by eight points. Ferencváros, despite having an underwhelming season and finishing sixth, handed Újpest their only home loss of the campaign for the second consecutive season. FTC beat UTE 0–2 at Megyeri Road in April with goals from Szőke and Branikovits.

In 1973 the league trophy returned to Megyeri Road for the fifth consecutive season. Ferencváros finished second, being five points away from their arch rivals. In game 27, Ferencváros defeated Újpest 2-1, with a late goal from Branikovits. However, earlier losses acquired by Ferencváros to Zalaegerszeg, Győr and Vasas eventually cost them the title.

In October 1973, Branikovits became the first FTC player to score a brace at Megyeri Road, as Ferencváros overcame Újpest 1-2. In 1974, the two teams again finished in the top two spots, with Újpest winning the league, three points above Ferencváros.

In 1975, Újpest won their seventh consecutive league title after winning 20 games, finishing 12 points above Ferencváros, who achieved a third-place finish.

In 1976, FTC finally managed to finish above Újpest, who achieved a bronze medal, and won their first league title since 1968, with the guidance of coach Jenő Dalnoki. In spite of this, Újpest beat Ferencváros 3-8 that season at the Népstadion, which was their largest margin of victory in the history of the derby up to that point. László Fazekas scored a hat-trick in 24 minutes, and eventually hit the next 5 times.

In 1977, both teams were within reach of another league title, but had to watch as it was another club from the capital, Vasas, who ended up champions, three points above the second place Újpest and six points above third place Ferencváros. Also in 1977, the teams met in the final four of the Hungarian Cup Final, with Ferencváros beating Újpest 3‐2, with goals from Pogány and Nyilasi. This was the first time in 43 years that Ferencváros and Újpest encountered each other in a cup final.

In 1978, Újpest won the league on the last day of the season. Funnily enough, it was Ferencváros who gave Újpest the one point they needed to win the league, after the teams drew 1–1 at Népstadion on the last day of the season. Újpest finished one point above Honvéd, while Ferencváros finished ninth, 17 points off Újpest.

In 1979, Újpest won their ninth national championship of the decade, finishing three points above Ferencváros. In September 1979, Ferencváros sought revenge for the 3–8 loss they had suffered 3 years prior, and beat Újpest 7‐1.

In October 1980, Újpest defeated FTC 0‐3 in the 9th district. This was the highest ever attended game at Üllői Út, with 35,000 people being present.

In 1981, Ferencváros won their 23rd first division title, while Újpest finished eighth, their worst since 1955. One of FTC's two home losses that season came against Újpest, as the Dózsa defeated them 0-3.

=== 1982-1990: Title-droughts, last encounter at Népstadion ===
In 1982, Ferencváros defeated Újpest 5‐0, after a hat-trick from László Szokolai. Ferencváros would finish runners up in two consecutive seasons, both times finishing behind Győri-ETO. At the end of the 1983 season, Ferencváros were leading the table, two points clear of Győr. While Fradi played Csepel in the last round, they also had to rely on Újpest defeating Győr. FTC failed to beat Csepel, after drawing 1-1, while Győri-ETO demolished Újpest 6-1, with Gyula Hajszán scoring a hat-trick. ETO claimed their third title.

In 1984, Ferencváros were fighting against relegation throughout much of the campaign. Six games away from the end of the season, the derby was held at Népstadion. Ferencváros ended up pulling off a shock victory, earning their first win in five weeks and won 1–0 with György Kerekes' goal in the 88th minute. Had FTC lost that game, they may very well have been relegated, as they finished three points above safety. Újpest achieved a fourth-place finish.

In the mid-80's, both teams experienced a regression, and would achieve their worst-ever league positions up to that point. In 1985, FTC finished 13th, while Újpest finished 11th in 1986. Ferencváros spent five consecutive seasons outside the top three, but Újpest achieved a bronze and a silver medal, and came within three points of winning the championship in 1987. 1987 also marked the last time the two teams faced each other in the Népstadion at a league game. Újpest won the last Derbi at Hungary's most famous stadium 1-0, thanks to Kozma's goal. In 1989, Ferencváros were close to winning the first division, but came two points short off of Budapest Honvéd.

=== 1990-2001: Chasing glory again ===
In 1990, Újpest and MTK finished on equal points, with Ferencváros finishing third. Due to their better head-to-head record in the season, Újpest claimed their first league title in 10 years. Újpest went unbeaten at home for the duration of the season, and the only team they failed to score against on home soil was Ferencváros, with whom they drew 0–0 in April 1990.

In August 1990, the teams met in the first game week of the season, and Ferencváros ended Újpest's unbeaten home streak, after a 0–5 shutout at Megyeri Road. This was the first game with Tibor Nyilasi, who had been a former legendary player, as Ferencváros' coach. Újpest had not been beaten in the 4th district since May 1989.

In 1992, Ferencváros finished one point above Vác, and won their first championship since 1981. The two sides met in the 1992 Hungarian Supercup, where Újpest got the best of their rivals, defeating them 3–1, in no small part thanks to Dénes Eszenyi, who scored a brace in 15 minutes. This was the first, and only time, that Újpest defeated Ferencváros in a final.

In October 1993, Újpest recorded their first victory over Ferencváros in 6 years, defeating them 1–0 with a goal from Attila Belvon. In May 1994, Újpest overcame FTC 1‐0 after István Kozma converted a penalty to give Újpest their first win at Üllői Út in 10 years.

In August 1994, Ferencváros suffered their first home loss of the season, after Újpest defeated them 0-3, with goals from Belvon and Bukovits. In 1995, Ferencváros won the league, finishing seven points above Újpest, and retained their title in the following season.

In 1997, Újpest finished runners up, while Ferencváros achieved the bronze medal. Despite achieving a lower league finish, FTC beat Újpest twice that season, 3–1 at home, and 1–2 away, with a 90 minute winner from Ferenc Horváth, in May 1997.

In 1998, Újpest won the first Division, under the guidance of Péter Várhidi, while Ferencváros finished second place, six points behind Újpest. The sides played two violent encounters over the season.

In November 1997, Ferencváros recorded another victory at Megyeri Road, with yet another late penalty goal from Péter Lipcsei.

In May 1998, Ferencváros hosted Újpest in front of a packed Üllő Út, in a game which ended 1-1, and featured 4 players being sent off. This has been Újpest's last national championship, as they have been unable to reclaim it ever since.

In September 1998, Újpest defeated FTC 2–1, with goals from Tamási and Herczeg at Megyeri Road, for the first time in five years. In April, Ferencváros sought revenge, winning 1–0 at Üllői Út, with Dragóner's goal. Ferencváros finished runners up, one point above the third placed Újpest at the end of the 1998/99 season.

=== 2001-2015: Ferencváros' relegation, 60th Újpest victory ===
In 2001, Ferencváros won the league in a now reduced first division of 12 teams. The following season, they looked on course to defend their title but, after losing 3–2 to Újpest (who themselves finished sixth) with a 90 minute goal at Megyeri Road in game 36, FTC's performance was only enough for a silver medal.

In 2003, FTC's aspirations of the title were indirectly ruined by Újpest again. Újpest suffered a 0–1 loss to MTK (with whom Ferencváros were level on points) on the last day of the season. Ferencváros failed to beat Debreceni VSC, and had to settle for the runners up spot for the second year running, two points off of MTK. Fans of both clubs invaded their respective fields, for different reasons. Even before the final whistle was blown, fans of Újpest erupted with joy upon learning of the FTC-DVSC score, and invaded the pitch in celebration of MTK's title, ahead of Ferencváros. Ferencváros' fans decided to invade the pitch of Flórián Albert stadium out of fury that the trophy had slipped from their hands despite finishing 1st in the regular season, to their (arguably) second biggest rivals, MTK. FTC were later given a fine by the MLSZ for their fans' actions. Újpest achieved a fourth place finish.

The Derbi took place four times that season, with Ferencváros winning two of them, and Újpest winning one. FTC snatched both victories with late goals; in March they defeated Újpest 1-0, with an 89 minute goal scored by Attila Tököli, while in April they came from behind to beat UTE 2-1, with Aleksandr Jovic scoring the winning goal in the 86th minute.

In May 2004, Újpest defeated Ferencváros twice (both 1-0) within a 3-week period, one of which was their first away victory over FTC in 10 years. They were leading the table, one point above their biggest rivals with one game to go. However, Újpest failed to beat MTK, while Ferencváros defeated Debreceni VSC 3-1. The 9th district's Ferencváros snatched the league title, finishing 1 point above Újpest.

In the 2004/05 season, Ferencváros finished runners up, six points behind DVSC, while Újpest achieved a fourth-place finish, two points above FTC. Újpest were one of only 6 teams to come away with a point from Üllői Út, drawing 1–1 in the centenarian derby in April 2005.

In October 2005, Ferencváros led 1–0 against Újpest for 50 minutes, but Újpest equalized in the 78th minute, and Zoltán Kovács eventually won the game for Újpest, scoring a 91st minute winning goal. In April 2006, the two teams contested one of the most violent Budapest derbies on Easter Day. The game featured 7 yellow cards and 3 red cards, two of which were instant. Ferencváros took the lead early on through a Lipcsei penalty, and held on to their lead until the 93rd minute. Zoltán Kovács equalised for 10-man Újpest before Péter Rajczi converted a penalty, winning the game for Újpest in shocking fashion in the 96th minute. After the game ended, a brawl ensued between the two sets of players.

In spite of winning both derbies of the season, Újpest "bottled" the title on the last day of the season, losing 1–3 to Fehérvár, despite leading 1-0 until the 69th minute. Újpest finished second at the end of the season, three points off champions Debrecen. Meanwhile, Ferencváros were relegated to the second division, due to not being given a first division license for the first time in their history. After a 3-year hiatus, the Derbi was held again in October 2009, with Újpest defeating Ferencváros 2–1 yet again with a late goal, due to an 88 minute strike from Rajczi.

In September 2010, Újpest defeated Ferencváros 6–0, their highest ever win against Ferencváros. In April 2011, Ferencváros ended their 7-year winless run against Újpest, by defeating them 1–0 at the Üllői Út.

In August 2012, the teams played one of the most dramatic Budapest derbies at Megyeri Road. Újpest took the lead early on through Kabát, and held on to their lead until the end of regular time. Orosz Márk equalised for FTC in the 90th minute, however, Újpest scored the winning goal of the game in the 94th minute, courtesy of Tshibouabua. In March 2013, Ferencváros bid farewell to their long-time home, Albert Flórián stadium, with a 2–1 win over Újpest. Ferencváros won the game with the last kick of the ball, as Çukić found the back of the net in the 93rd minute.

In September 2013, the derby returned to the Népstadion (now Ferenc Puskás Stadium), as Ferencváros' new stadium was under construction. Ferencváros defeated UTE 3-1. In April 2014, Ferencváros recorded their first derby win at Megyeri Road in the 21st century, as Ferencváros overcame Újpest's lead for Leandro's goal to win the game in the 88th minute.

In September 2014, Újpest recorded what remains their most recent home win over Ferencváros, thanks to a goal from Simon in the 72nd minute, making it 2–1.

in December 2015, Újpest defeated Ferencváros away 0–1. This was the first home loss FTC incurred in the league since the inauguration of their new stadium, Groupama Arena, in August 2014. This would also be the only home game Ferencváros lost throughout the entire campaign, as they won their first league title in 12 years. Újpest have not recorded a single victory over FTC ever since.

=== 2015- : Magyar Kupa-Final, Record-winning Ferencváros, winless Újpest ===
On 7 May 2016, Ferencváros beat Újpest 1‐0 in the Hungarian cup final at the Groupama Aréna, with a goal by Zoltán Gera. The referee was Zoltán Iványi.

In May 2017, Ferencváros defeated Újpest 2-0 at Üllői Út, with goals from Hajnal and Varga. The victory meant Ferencváros recorded their 100th victory over Újpest in the league.

In 2018, both teams finished within the top three for the first time since 2004, as FTC finished second, while Újpest finished third.

In 2021, Ferencváros won their 32nd championship. They confirmed their status as champions in game 30 against Újpest, defeating Újpest 3-0.

In 2022, FTC won their fourth consecutive, and 33rd overall, national title, after defeating Újpest 2–1 in game 29.

On 19 May 2024, Ferencváros beat Újpest 2-0 and set a record of winning 16 consecutive derbies.

In the 2025–26 Nemzeti Bajnokság I, Ferencváros were competing for the league title with Győr. In the penultimate round of the season, Ferencváros were hosted by Újpest, while Győr hosted Diósgyőri VTK. If Ferencváros draws or loses and Győr wins, the league title would be in Győr's hands. Three days before the match, all the tickets were sold for the derby.

The two sides have met in 243 1st Division games, with Ferencváros winning 119, and Újpest winning 61 of them. Ferencváros have handed Újpest the most league losses out of all Hungarian teams by a wide margin. MTK, who have the second most league victories over UTE, have got exactly 20 fewer wins against the 4th district team, than Ferencváros.

On 3 May 2026, Ferencváros beat Újpest 5-0 at the Szusza Ferenc Stadion. The match was interrupted for 10 minutes. Due to hooliganism, both clubs were fined by Hungarian Football Federation.

== Hooliganism ==
In May 1998, Ferencváros hosted Újpest for a derby. There was violence and fights both preceding and after the game. Before the match, fans of Ferencváros, who had been waiting for Újpest, threw a rain of rocks at the arriving purple and white fanatics. After the game, fans of both teams threw beer cans and rocks at the policemen present. 11 fans were detained afterwards.

Prior to the April 1999 meeting of the two clubs, fans of Ferencváros clashed with the police at Népliget, hurling rocks and steel chairs at them. The police were forced to resort to using horses and teargas to disperse the crowd. The arriving Újpest fans received a similar treatment, and althrew rocks at eacttradi ultras.

In September 2010, Újpest shut Ferencváros out 6–0 at Megyeri Road, their highest ever margin of victory against Ferencváros. Fans of Ferencváros, angered by their team's performance, ripped seats out and started throwing them onto the field. After Ferencváros conceded the fifth goal, all hell broke loose in the away sector. The riot police were called in, and had to form a wall in order to prevent any Ferencváros ultras from entering the pitch; regardless, a large number of them still attempted to do so. Referee Solymosi made the decision to interrupt the game, which was stopped for ten minutes, while the police were handling the situation.

In the 2012–13 season, Ferencváros hosted Újpest. Before the match there was a big fight between the Újpest supporters and the police at the Újpest–Központ. The catalyst of the fight was fans of Újpest hurling beer cans and road signs at the police. Újpest fans were taken by a tram selected for this specific occasion. Upon their arrival at Üllői Road, which was led by then mayor Zsolt Wintermantel, they exchanged sets of rocks with Ferencváros fans. Two Újpest fans were taken to the 9th district police station, one of them for attempting to enter the Flórián Albert Stadium with a knife.

In the 2013–14 season, after the derby, the police had to use tear gas to dissipate the Újpest fans at the Szusza Derenc Stadium.

On 4 April 2015, the ultras of both sides announced their boycott of the 2014–15 Hungarian League derby at the Groupama Arena.

Before the 2014–15 Hungarian League Ferencváros-Újpest match, the mayor of Újpest, Zsolt Wintermantel, said that "without spectators there is no derby". Wintermantel also signed the letter announcing that Újpest fans would not attend the derby due to the regulations at the entrance of the newly built Groupama Arena.

== Similar rivalries ==
The rivalry between Ferencváros and Újpest is very similar to the rivalry between SK Rapid Wien and FK Austria Wien. Both Ferencváros and Rapid Wien use green-white colors, while both Újpest and Austria Wien use purple-white colors.

== Fans ==
Besides the district of Ferencváros, Ferencvárosi TC has a large fan base in the countryside, while the fans of Újpest FC are mainly based in the fourth district of Budapest (Újpest) and other parts of Budapest as well. Ferencváros have the most fans in the country, with an estimated 2 million people supporting them, scattered all over the country. This includes areas outside of Hungary with a large Hungarian population, such as Felvidék, Délvidék, and Erdély. Naturally, a lot of Ferencváros fans come from the eponymous district of Budapest, but FTC tends to be the most popular team in other districts as well, even surpassing the popularity of the local teams of the districts. This is the case in Csepel, Rákosfalva, and Zugló. They are also the most popular team in almost all cities in Hungary, (even in cities which have local teams) with the exception of Miskolc, Debrecen, Fehérvár, and Győr. Their ultra group, known as Green Monsters, were founded in 1995, and have gained notoriety for their violence and willingness to cause chaos. They were especially feared in the early 2000s, when away fans rarely turned up in big numbers at Üllői Út. The club's image is extremely political, as it was founded by Christian swabians living in Hungary, and is associated with the Hungarian far-right.

Újpest are the second most supported team in the country, and have the majority of their fanbase in the 4th district. A lot of Újpest fans can be found in the neighbouring districts, such as Óbuda, and Újpalota. As is the case with their green counterparts, Újpest have a lot of fans outside of Budapest, and in provincial cities, such as Szombathely and Karczag. Their ultra group is known as Viola Fidelity, which came into existence in 2002. Fidelity was preceded by (and as such, built upon the foundations of) Újpest Ultras, founded in 1992. Since the 1990s, Újpest fans have gained a reputation for being far-right as well.

== All-time league results ==
=== Nemzeti Bajnokság I (1905–present) ===
Ferencváros won Újpest won Draw

	Ferencváros – Újpest				Újpest – Ferencváros			
Season	Date	Venue	Score	Attendance	Date	Venue	Score	Attendance
1905	19–02–1905	Soroksári úti	2 – 0	?	17–09–1905	Népsziget	1 – 3	?
1906–07	30–09–1906	Népsziget	2 – 0	6,500	24–03–1907	Népsziget	0 – 5	?
1907–08	10–03–1908	Népsziget	2 – 0	?	29–09–1907	Népsziget	0 – 6	?
1909–10	26–09–1909	Népsziget	6 – 2	?	13–02–1910	Népsziget	1 – 3	800
1910–11	30–10–1910	Soroksári úti stadion	7 – 1	1,130	30–04–1911	Ferenczvárosi versenypálya	1 – 7	4,000
1912–13	08–12–1912	Ferenczvárosi versenypálya	5 – 1	5,000				
1913–14	16–11–1913	Ferenczvárosi versenypálya	5 – 1	3,000	14–06–1914	Népsziget	2 – 3	?
1916–17	10–12–1916	Ferenczvárosi versenypálya	1 – 0	800	24–06–1917	Amerikai úti stadion	4 – 1	1,800
1917–18	07–07–1918	Ferenczvárosi versenypálya	6 – 0	7,000	23–06–1918	Népsziget	1 – 1	1,500
1918–19	08–09–1918	Ferenczvárosi versenypálya	2 – 1	?	23–02–1919	Népsziget	0 – 0	?
1919–20	15–02–1920	Ferenczvárosi versenypálya	2 – 1	7,000	21–12–1919	Népsziget	0 – 3	?
1920–21	28–11–1920	Ferenczvárosi versenypálya	1 – 3	4,500	08–05–1921	Népsziget	1 – 0	7,000
1921–22	18–09–1921	Ferenczvárosi versenypálya	3 – 2	16,000	26–03–1922	Népsziget	2 – 2	6,000
1922–23	27–05–1923	Ferenczvárosi versenypálya	0 – 0	25,000	17–09–1922	Megyeri úti stadion	2 – 1	15,000
1923–24	09–03–1924	Üllői úti stadion	2 – 1	11,000	26–08–1923	Megyeri úti stadion	0 – 2	14,000
1924-25	15–03–1925	Üllői úti stadion	2 – 1	?	01–11–1924	Megyeri úti stadion	1 – 1	?
1925-26	20–12–1925	Üllői úti stadion	2 – 0	?	30–05–1926	Megyeri úti stadion	3 – 1	?
1926-27	20–03–1927	Üllői úti stadion	2 – 1	?	03–10–1926	Megyeri úti stadion	0 – 0	?
1927-28	02–10–1927	Üllői úti stadion	1 – 0	?	04–03–1928	Megyeri úti stadion	1 – 1	?
1928-29	24–03–1929	Üllői úti stadion	3 – 1	?	02–09–1928	Megyeri úti stadion	1 – 1	?
1929-30	23–03–1930	Üllői úti stadion	1 – 1	?	10–10–1929	Megyeri úti stadion	1 – 2	?
1930-31	09–11–1930	Üllői úti stadion	1 – 1	?	15–04–1931	Megyeri úti stadion	3 – 1	?
1931-32	22–11–1931	Üllői úti stadion	1 – 0	?	10–04–1932	Megyeri úti stadion	0 – 5	?
1932-33	20–10–1932	Üllői úti stadion	3 – 3	?	14–05–1933	Megyeri úti stadion	1 – 0	?
1933-34	15–10–1933	Üllői úti stadion	4 – 2	?	22–04–1934	Megyeri úti stadion	2 – 2	?
1934-35	28–10–1934	Üllői úti stadion	1 – 1	?	02–06–1935	Megyeri úti stadion	0 – 0	?
1935-36	01–09–1935	Üllői úti stadion	2 – 3	?	22–05–1936	Megyeri úti stadion	4 – 1	?
1936-37	02–03–1937	Üllői úti stadion	4 – 2	?	22–11–1936	Megyeri úti stadion	2 – 0	?
1937-38	03–10–1937	Üllői úti stadion	3 – 1	?	30–01–1938	Megyeri úti stadion	4 – 2	?
1938-39	06–10–1938	Üllői úti stadion	3 – 1	?	23–04–1939	Megyeri úti stadion	3 – 3	?
1939-40	17–12–1939	Üllői úti stadion	0 – 1	?	17–03–1940	Megyeri úti stadion	4 – 1	?
1940-41	18–03–1941	Üllői úti stadion	5 – 2	?	03–11–1940	Megyeri úti stadion	0 – 5	?
1941-42	10–05–1942	Üllői úti stadion	3 – 3	?	30–11–1941	Megyeri úti stadion	6 – 2	?
1942-43	14–06–1943	Üllői úti stadion	2 – 2	?	06–12–1943	Megyeri úti stadion	4 – 5	?
1943-44	26–03–1944	Üllői úti stadion	2 – 1	?	14–11–1943	Megyeri úti stadion	2 – 1	?
1945	13–05–1945	Üllői úti stadion	1 – 0	?	22–06–1945	Megyeri úti stadion	3 – 2	?
1945-46	09–06–1946	Üllői úti stadion	1 – 1	?	14–07–1946	Megyeri úti stadion	2 – 2	?
1946-47	09–03–1947	Üllői úti stadion	1 – 0	?	13–10–1946	Megyeri úti stadion	1 – 1	?
1947-48	15–10–1947	Üllői úti stadion	2 – 0	?	19–09–1949	Megyeri úti stadion	5 – 1	40,000
1948-49	14–05–1949	Üllői úti stadion	0 – 5	34,000	26–12–1948	Megyeri úti stadion	3 – 5	22,000
1949-50	21–05–1950	Üllői úti stadion	8 – 1	38,000	18–09–1949	Megyeri úti stadion	1 – 4	40,000
1950	Transitional season, no second fixture played				03–12–1950	Megyeri úti stadion	1 – 0	20,000
1951	30–04–1951	Népstadion	2 – 1	32,000	07–11–1951	Megyeri úti stadion	3 – 3	35,000
1952	20–04–1952	Népstadion	3 – 3	37,000	30–11–1952	Megyeri úti stadion	1 – 0	15,000
1953	12–04–1953	Népstadion	3 – 5	35,000	14–11–1953	Megyeri úti stadion	1 – 1	30,000
1954	02–05–1954	Népstadion	3 – 2	55,000	05–09–1954	Megyeri úti stadion	4 – 1	50,000
1955	06–11–1955	Népstadion	3 – 2	50,000	05–06–1955	Megyeri úti stadion	4 – 0	70,000
1956	07–06–1956	Népstadion	1 – 1	?	02–03–1956	Megyeri úti stadion	0 – 0	?
1957	Transitional season, no second fixture played				12–05–1957	Megyeri úti stadion	2 – 1	55,000
1958-59	14–06–1959	Népstadion	3 – 4	30,000	03–09–1958	Megyeri úti stadion	2 – 4	30,000
1959-60	22–08–1959	Népstadion	1 – 0	40,000	23–09–1961	Megyeri úti stadion	2 – 1	40,000
1960-61	25–09–1960	Népstadion	1 – 2	55,000	02–04–1961	Megyeri úti stadion	2 – 1	35,000
1961-62	25–02–1962	Népstadion	1 – 2	25,000	23–09–1961	Megyeri úti stadion	2 – 1	40,000
1962-63	12–08–1962	Népstadion	2 – 2	60,000	07–04–1963	Megyeri úti stadion	0 – 2	40,000
1963	10–11–1963	Népstadion	1 – 0	30,000	Transitional season, no second fixture played			
1964	27–05–1964	Népstadion	4 – 1	60,000	19–07–1964	Népstadion	4 – 2	85,000
1965	01–08–1965	Népstadion	3 – 1	60,000	13–10–1965	Megyeri úti stadion	2 – 0	40,000
1966	22–03–1966	Népstadion	5 – 2	?	16–10–1966	Megyeri úti stadion	3 – 5	?
1967	12–11–1967	Népstadion	3 – 3	?	16–04–1967	Megyeri úti stadion	0 – 3	?
1968	17–08–1968	Népstadion	1 – 1	?	19–05–1968	Megyeri úti stadion	1 – 1	?
1969	15–05–1969	Népstadion	0 – 2	?	26–10–1969	Megyeri úti stadion	1 – 1	?
1970	27–06–1970	Népstadion	1 – 1	?	08–06–1970	Megyeri úti stadion	3 – 2	?
1970–71	08–11–1970	Népstadion	2 – 2	?	29–05–1971	Megyeri úti stadion	0 – 1	?
1971–72	07–10–1971	Népstadion	1 – 2	20,000	15–04–1972	Megyeri úti stadion	0 – 2	18,000
1972–73	26–03–1973	Népstadion	2 – 1	?	27–10–1973	Megyeri úti stadion	2 – 0	13,000
1973–74	06–04–1974	Népstadion	1 – 1	?	27–10–1973	Megyeri úti stadion	1 – 2	?
1974–75	09–10–1974	Népstadion	1 – 3	?	17–05–1975	Megyeri úti stadion	2 – 2	?
1975–76	15–05–1976	Népstadion	3 – 8	50,000	06–09–1975	Megyeri úti stadion	1 – 4	?
1976–77	02–10–1976	Népstadion	3 – 0	?	21–05–1977	Megyeri úti stadion	2 – 1	?
1977–78	21–09–1977	Üllői úti stadion	1 – 1	?	22–04–1978	Megyeri úti stadion	1 – 1	?
1978–79	23–05–1979	Üllői úti stadion	1 – 1	30,000	04–10–1980	Megyeri úti stadion	2 – 2	?
1979–80	22–09–1979	Népstadion	7 – 1	40,000	29–03–1980	Megyeri úti stadion	4 – 1	?
1980–81	18–10–1980	Üllői úti stadion	0 – 3	29,777	18–04–1981	Megyeri úti stadion	0 – 2	16,000
1981–82	21–04–1982	Üllői úti stadion	5 – 0	25,000	11–11–1981	Megyeri úti stadion	2 – 1	12,000
1982–83	07–05–1982	Üllői úti stadion	2 – 1	45,000	24–10–1982	Megyeri úti stadion	3 – 0	45,000
1983–84	05–10–1983	Üllői úti stadion	1 – 1	25,000	28–04–1984	Megyeri úti stadion	0 – 1	25,000
1984–85	18–05–1985	Üllői úti stadion	0 – 2	25,000	27–10–1984	Megyeri úti stadion	0 – 1	22,000
1985–86	29–03–1986	Üllői úti stadion	3 – 1	25,000	14–09–1985	Megyeri úti stadion	1 – 0	25,000
1986–87	20–09–1986	Üllői úti stadion	0 – 0	35,000	11–04–1987	Megyeri úti stadion	1 – 0	15,000
1987–88	28–05–1988	Üllői úti stadion	0 – 0	25,000	31–10–1987	Megyeri úti stadion	1 – 4	18,000
1988–89	03–09–1988	Üllői úti stadion	3 – 0	27,000	18–03–1989	Megyeri úti stadion	0 – 2	25,000
1989–90	30–09–1989	Üllői úti stadion	2 – 0	?	14–04–1990	Megyeri úti stadion	0 – 0	18,000
1990–91	09–03–1991	Üllői úti stadion	1 – 0		18–08–1990	Megyeri úti stadion	0 – 5	12,000
1991–92	02–05–1992	Üllői úti stadion	3 – 2		19–10–1991	Megyeri úti stadion	1 – 1	
1992–93	24–03–1993	Üllői úti stadion	3 – 0		02–09–1993	Megyeri úti stadion	0 – 0	
1993–94	14–03–1994	Üllői úti stadion	0 – 3		22–10–1993	Megyeri úti stadion	1 – 0	
1994–95	29–08–1994	Üllői úti stadion	0 – 3	16,000	03–04–1995	Megyeri úti stadion	1 – 3	22,000
1995–96	13–08–1995	Üllői úti stadion	2 – 0		19–03–1996	Megyeri úti stadion	1 – 1	
1996–97	01–11–1997	Üllői úti stadion	2 – 1		10–05–1997	Megyeri úti stadion	1 – 2	
1997–98	16–05–1998	Üllői úti stadion	1 – 1		02–11–1997	Megyeri úti stadion	1 – 2	
1998–99	16–04–1999	Üllői úti stadion	1 – 0		18–09–1998	Megyeri úti stadion	2 – 1	
1999–2000	14–04–2000	Üllői úti stadion	0 – 0		24–10–1999	Megyeri úti stadion	2 – 2	
2000–01	11–05–2001	Üllői úti stadion	2 – 2		29–11–2000	Megyeri úti stadion	0 – 1	
2001–02	27–07–2001	Üllői úti stadion	2 – 1	13,000	23–10–2001	Megyeri úti stadion	2 – 2	4,000
2001–02	15–03–2002	Üllői úti stadion	2 – 0	15,627	17–05–2002	Megyeri úti stadion	3 – 2	5,000
2002–03	07–03–2003	Üllői úti stadion	1 – 0	14,000	13–09–2002	Megyeri úti stadion	3 – 0	5,019
2002–03	22–04–2003	Üllői úti stadion	2 – 1	8,600	16–05–2003	Megyeri úti stadion	0 – 0	?
2003–04	29–11–2003	Üllői úti stadion	2 – 1	11,000	31–08–2003	Megyeri úti stadion	1 – 1	4,000
2003–04	30–04–2004	Üllői úti stadion	0 – 1	8,000	22–05–2004	Ferenc Szusza Stadium	1 – 0	10,000
2004–05	26–04–2005	Üllői úti stadion	1 – 1	8,308	16–10–2004	Ferenc Szusza Stadium	1 – 1	7,000
2005–06	15–04–2006	Üllői úti stadion	1 – 2	9,369	15–10–2005	Ferenc Szusza Stadium	2 – 1	7,500
2009–10	30–04–2010	Stadion Albert Flórián	0 – 1	10,000	03–10–2009	Ferenc Szusza Stadium	2 – 1	11,763
2010–11	01–04–2011	Stadion Albert Flórián	1 – 0	10,000	11–09–2010	Ferenc Szusza Stadium	6 – 0	10,500
2011–12	22–10–2011	Stadion Albert Flórián	3 – 0	12,000	12–05–2012	Ferenc Szusza Stadium	1 – 1	10,000
2012–13	10–03–2013	Stadion Albert Flórián	2 – 1	16,000	19–08–2012	Ferenc Szusza Stadium	2 – 1	9,827
2013–14	22–09–2013	Ferenc Puskás Stadium	3 – 1	22,094	04–04–2014	Ferenc Szusza Stadium	1 – 2	9,517
2014–15	12–04–2015	Groupama Arena	2 – 0	21,217	21–09–2014	Ferenc Szusza Stadium	2 – 1	8,500
2015–16	13–12–2015	Groupama Arena	0 – 1	17,489	12–09–2015	Ferenc Szusza Stadium	1 – 2	8,445
2015–16	23-04-2016	Groupama Arena	2 – 2	11,267				
2016–17	24–09–2016	Groupama Arena	3 – 3	11,760	04–03–2017	Ferenc Szusza Stadium	0 – 1	8,005
2016–17	27–05–2017	Groupama Arena	2 – 0	10,341				
2017–18	21–10–2017	Groupama Arena	1 – 0	14,752	23–07–2017	Ferenc Szusza Stadium	2 – 2	6,567
2017–18					31–03–2018	Ferenc Szusza Stadium	0 – 0	9,596
2018–19	29–09–2018	Groupama Arena	1 – 0		09–02–2019	Ferenc Szusza Stadium	1 – 1	
2018–19	04–05–2019	Groupama Arena	2 – 1					
2019–20	19–10–2019	Groupama Arena	1 – 0		27–05–2020	Ferenc Szusza Stadium	0 – 1	
2019–20	20–06–2020	Groupama Arena	1 – 0					
2020–21	24–10–2020	Groupama Arena	2 – 0		03–02–2021	Ferenc Szusza Stadium	0 – 4	
2020–21	24–04–2021	Groupama Arena	3 – 0					
2021–22	26–09–2021	Groupama Arena	3 – 1		30–01–2022	Ferenc Szusza Stadium	0 – 1	
2021–22	24–04–2022	Groupama Arena	2 – 1					
2022–23	05–02–2023	Groupama Arena	3 – 1	18,197	04–09–2022	Ferenc Szusza Stadium	0 – 6	6,981
2022–23					01–05–2023	Ferenc Szusza Stadium	2 – 3	11,109
2023–24	29–10–2023	Groupama Arena	3 – 0	20,357	25–02–2024	Ferenc Szusza Stadium	0 – 5	11,202
2023–24	18–05–2024	Groupama Arena	2 – 0	18,767				
2024–25	17–08–2024	Groupama Arena	1 – 0	18,751	01–12–2024	Ferenc Szusza Stadion	0 – 0	10,273
2024–25	06–04–2025	Groupama Arena	2 – 0	18,557				
2025–26	07–02–2026	Groupama Arena	3 – 0	18,779	19–10–2025	Ferenc Szusza Stadion	1 – 1	10,569
2025–26					03–05–2026	Ferenc Szusza Stadion	0 – 5	10,930
2026–27	05–09–2026	Groupama Arena			19–12–2026	Ferenc Szusza Stadion		
2026–27	17–04–2027	Groupama Arena						

=== Statistics ===
As of 3 May 2026:

- Most goals in the history of the Derbi: Imre Schlosser, Ferencváros, 26 goals
- Most goals in a single Derbi: Imre Schlosser, 6, Ferencváros 7–1 Újpest, 30th April, 1911.
- Highest scoring Derbi: League: Ferencváros 3–8 Újpest, 15th of May, 1976. Cup: Ferencváros 11–1 Újpest, 25th of May, 1933.
- Ferencváros' largest victories: Home: Ferencváros 8–1 Újpest, 21st of May, 1950. Away: Újpest 0–6 Ferencváros, 4th of September, 2022
- Újpest's largest victories: Home: Újpest 6–0 Ferencváros, 11th September, 2010. Away: Ferencváros 3–8 Újpest, 15th of May, 1976
- Ferencváros' longest unbeaten streak: 31 matches*, 12th of December, 2015 – present
- Újpest's longest unbeaten streak: 9 matches, 29th of November, 2003- 1st of April, 2011.
- Most consecutive victories: Ferencváros, 17 successive Derbi wins (4th of May, 2019 – 1st of December, 2024)
- Highest ever attended Derbi: 85,000 – 19th of July, 1964 – Újpest 4–2 Ferencváros

Competition	Ferencváros wins	Draws	Újpest wins
Hungarian League (Nemzeti Bajnokság I)	123	64	61
Hungarian Cup (Magyar Kupa)	13	4	5
Hungarian Super Cup (Magyar szuperkupa)	0	0	1
Hungarian League Cup (Magyar ligakupa)	2	2	0
Other competitions (Egyéb kiírások)	16	2	10
Total	154	72	77

== Head-to-head ranking in Nemzeti Bajnokság I ==
P.	60	61	62	63	63*	64	65	66	67	68	69	70	71	72	73	74	75	76	77	78	79	80	81	82	83	84	85	86	87	88	89	90	91	92	93	94	95	96	97	98	99	00	01	02	03	04	05	06	07	08	09	10	11	12	13	14	15	16	17	18	19	20	21	22	23	24	25	26
1	1			1		1			1	1	1	1	1	1	1	1	1	1		1	1		1									1		1			1	1		1			1			1												1			1	1	1	1	1	1	1	
2	2	2	2				2	2	2	2		2	2		2	2			2		2	2		2	2				2		2		2				2		2	2	2			2	2	2	2	2			2						2			2								2
3			3	3	3		3				3						3	3	3											3		3			3			3	3		3												3			3				3								
4		4						4																		4										4							4		4		4		4	4		4							4									
5						5								5										5	5			5	5	5												5													5						5			5				
6					6																	6														6								6				6					6				6	6				6	6					
7																																																				7							7								7	7
8																							8											8																															8			
9																				9											9		9																						9													
10																											10															10																								10		
11																												11																										11														
12																										12																																										
13																											13																											13		13												
14																																			14																																	
15																																																																				
16																																																																				
17																																																																				
18																																																																				
Nemzeti Bajnokság II (NB II)
1																																																			1																	
2																																																	2																			
3																																																		3																		

Key
Újpest
Ferencváros

•Total: Ferencváros 42 times higher, Újpest 26 times higher.

== Title-races ==
Titleraces
Year	Champions 🏆	Runners-up 🥈
1927	Ferencváros	Újpest
1930	Újpest	Ferencváros
1932	Ferencváros	Újpest
1934	Ferencváros	Újpest
1935	Újpest	Ferencváros
1938	Ferencváros	Újpest
1939	Újpest	Ferencváros
1941	Ferencváros	Újpest
1945	Újpest	Ferencváros
1960	Újpest	Ferencváros
1967	Ferencváros	Újpest
1968	Ferencváros	Újpest
1970	Újpest	Ferencváros
1971	Újpest	Ferencváros
1973	Újpest	Ferencváros
1974	Újpest	Ferencváros
1979	Újpest	Ferencváros
1995	Ferencváros	Újpest
2004	Ferencváros	Újpest

Ferencváros and Újpest have finished in the top 2 of the Hungarian League simultaneously 19 times. Újpest have won the championship over Ferencváros 10 times, while Ferencváros won the league with Újpest as runners-up on 9 occasions.

In 1927, Ferencváros finished 7 points above runners up Újpest, in the first ever title-race between the two clubs. In 1930, Újpest won their first ever National Title, as they beat out Ferencváros by 2 points.

In 1934, Ferencváros finished 2 points above Újpest to win their 13th national championship. The following year, Újpest sough revenge, as they too finished two points above their biggest rivals. In 1938, Ferencváros finished three points above UTE to win the league. The following season, the clubs were separated by just one point, as Újpest won their fifth national title. In 1941, Ferencváros won the league 12 points clear off of Újpest, officially overtaking MTK in the amount of national titles.

In 1960 Újpest finished five points above Ferencváros in the first post-WW2 title-race between the two. In 1967, Ferencváros won their 20th league title, after finishing eight points above Újpest. The following season, Ferencváros repeated this feat, this time finishing one point above Újpest.

Throughout the 1970s, Újpest won the league seven consecutive times, and won nine national titles altogether. Ferencváros came the closest to challenging Újpest. Other than breaking their hegemony in 1976, and being the only team to defeat Újpest in back-to-back seasons in 1972 and 1973, Ferencváros finished second to UTE in 1970, 1973, 1974 and 1979.

In 1995 Ferencváros finished seven points above Újpest, winning their 25th national title.

== Magyar Kupa & Szuperkupa Finals ==
Ferencváros and Újpest met in four finals of the Magyar Kupa. The first encounter took place in the 1922 Magyar Kupa Final, with FTC defeating Újpest 1-0 with a goal by Károly Wágner. In 1927, Ferencváros defeated Újpest again in the Final of the Hungarian Cup, winning 3-0. József Turay scored a brace in 10 minutes. The sides also met in the 1932-33 Magyar Kupa Final. Ferencváros beat Újpest by a record of 11–1 at the Hungária körúti stadion.

In 1977, both teams made it to the final four of the Hungarian Cup, where Fradi triumphed 3-2 over Újpest.

In 1992, Újpest defeated Ferencváros 3-1 in the Supercup Final. Dénes Eszenyi scored a brace in 15 minutes.

In 2016, Ferencváros defeated Újpest in the 2016 Magyar Kupa Final. The encounter took place at the Groupama Arena, and was attended by 9,000 people.

25 May 1933
17:30 (UTC+2)

Ferencváros FC	11–1	Újpest FC
Táncos 6' 50'; Sárosi 13' 21' 35'; Takács 15' 17' 72' 83'; Toldi 70'; Kohut 74'	Report	Szabó 78'

Hungária körúti stadion, Budapest
Attendance: 10,000
Referee: Árpád Klein (Hungary)
7 May 2016
(CEST)

Újpest (I)	0–1	Ferencváros (I)
		Gera 79'

Groupama Aréna, Budapest (Ferencváros)
Attendance: 19,000
Referee: Zoltán Iványi

== Players who played for both clubs ==
Players from Ferencváros to Újpest

- (Hungary) Ferenc Deák (1950)
- Zoltán Ebedli (1953)
- (Romania) Vasile Miriuță (1998)
- (Hungary) József Mogyorósi (1998)
- (Socialist Federal Republic of Yugoslavia) Goran Kopunović (1997), not directly

Players from Újpest to Ferencváros

- Zoltán Ebedli (1953)
- (Hungary) Lajos Szűcs (1999)
- (Hungary) Dénes Rósa (2003)
- (Hungary) Imre Deme (2006); not directly

Managers for both teams

== Players under 20 who scored goals ==
Krisztián Lisztes has been the youngest player to score a goal at the derby.

Player	Age	Date	Score
Krisztián Lisztes Jr. (FTC)	17	2023.05.01.	Újpest–FTC 2–3
Krisztián Simon (Újpest)	19	2010.09.11.	Újpest–FTC 6–0
Lajos Terjék (Újpest)	18	1999.10.25.	Újpest–FTC 2–2
Krisztián Lisztes Sr. (FTC)	18	1995.04.03.	Újpest–FTC 1–3
Péter Lipcsei (FTC)	19	1992.03.11.	FTC–Újpest 1–1 (MK*)
Ferenc Szabó (FTC)	19	1975.09.06.	Újpest–FTC 1–4
Ferenc Szabó (FTC)	19	1975.05.27.	FTC–Újpest 2–2
Tibor Nyilasi (FTC)	19	1974.10.09.	Újpest–FTC 3–1
Németh Miklós (FTC)	19	1965.08.01.	Újpest–FTC 1:3
Zoltán Varga (FTC)	19	1964.07.19.	Újpest–FTC 4:2
Zoltán Varga (FTC)	19	1964.05.27.	FTC–Újpest 4:1
Ferenc Bene (Újpest)	18	1962.08.12.	FTC–Újpest 2:2
Flórián Albert (FTC – 2 goals)	18	1959.06.14.	FTC–Újpest 3:4
Béla Kuharszki (Újpest)	19	1959.06.14.	FTC–Újpest 3:4
János Göröcs (Újpest)	19	1958.06.28.	FTC–Újpest 1:4
János Göröcs (Újpest)	19	1957.12.15.	Újpest–FTC 1:1
Zoltán Czibor (FTC)	19	1948.12.26.	Újpest–FTC 3:5
Sándor Kocsis (FTC)	19	1948.12.26.	Újpest–FTC 3:5
László Kubala (FTC)	18	1945.07.22.	Újpest–FTC 3:2
Mihály Győrvári (Újpest)	19	1941.11.30.	Újpest–FTC 6:2
Ferenc Szusza (Újpest – 2 goals)	17	1941.11.30.	Újpest–FTC 6:2
Gyula Kiss (FTC)	19	1935.09.01.	FTC–Újpest 2:3
Vilmos Kohut (FTC)	19	1925.03.15.	FTC–Újpest 2:1
Ernő Schwarz (FTC)	18	1922.03.26.	Újpest–FTC 2:2
Ferenc Héger (FTC)	18	1920.02.15.	FTC–Újpest 2:1

== See also ==
- Derby of Budapest
- Ferencvárosi TC
- Újpest FC
- Örökrangadó
