= History of Vasas SC =

Hungarian football club history

Vasas Sport Club is a professional football club based in Budapest, Hungary.

== 1910s ==
Vasas were promoted to the Nemzeti Bajnokság I in 1916 for the first time. In their first season (1916–17 Nemzeti Bajnokság I) the club finished 6th.

== 1920s ==
Vasas finished third in the 1924–25 Nemzeti Bajnokság I season. Only MTK Budapest and Ferencváros could overtake the club in the championship. In the following (1925–26 Nemzeti Bajnokság I) season the club could repeat their success. Vasas collected 29 points and won 11 out of 22 matches in the season.

Vilmos Kertész coached the team from 1926 to 1930.

In the 1928–29 Nemzeti Bajnokság I season Vasas finished 11th and they were relegated. Vasas won only 5 out of the 22 matches and gained only 14 points.

== 1930s ==
Vasas returned to the top flight of the Hungarian League in the 1930–31 Nemzeti Bajnokság I season and the club finished 8th securing their membership in the top league. However, in the next season (1931–32 Nemzeti Bajnokság I) Vasas were relegated again for the second time in the club's history. Vasas finished 11th and collected only 13 points by winning only 5 out of 22 matches.

== 1940s ==
After World War II, Béla Guttmann coached Vasas SC from July 1945 – 1946.

== 1950s ==

Vasas's line-up in the 1957–58 European Cup semi-final against Real Madrid C.F. at the Népstadion.

Vasas won their first Hungarian League title in 1957 and they entered the 1957–58 European Cup. On 4 September 1957 PFC CSKA Sofia beat Vasas 2–1 at the Vasil Levski National Stadium in the first leg of the preliminary round. On 3 October 1957 Vasas beat 6-1 PFC CSKA Sofia at Népstadion in the second leg of the preliminary round.

On 20 November 1957 BSC Young Boys drew (1-1) with Vasas at the Charmilles Stadium in the first leg of the first round. On 30 November 1957 Vasas beat BSC Young Boys at Népstadion. On 5 February 1958 Ajax Amsterdam drew (2-2) with Vasas at the Olympisch Stadion in the first leg of the quarter-finals.

On 26 February 1958 Vasas beat 4-0 Ajax Amsterdam at Népstadion. The goals were scored by Szilágyi (9th and 39th minute), Csordás (29th minute), and Bundzsák (7th minute). On 2 April 1958 Real Madrid C.F. beat 4-0 Vasas at the Santiago Bernabéu Stadium in the first leg of the semi-final. Although Vasas beat Real Madrid 2–0 at the Népstadion on 16 April 1958, they were eliminated from the 1957–58 European Cup. Vasas have been the most successful Hungarian club in the European Cup and UEFA Champions League history along with Győri ETO FC.

== 1960s ==
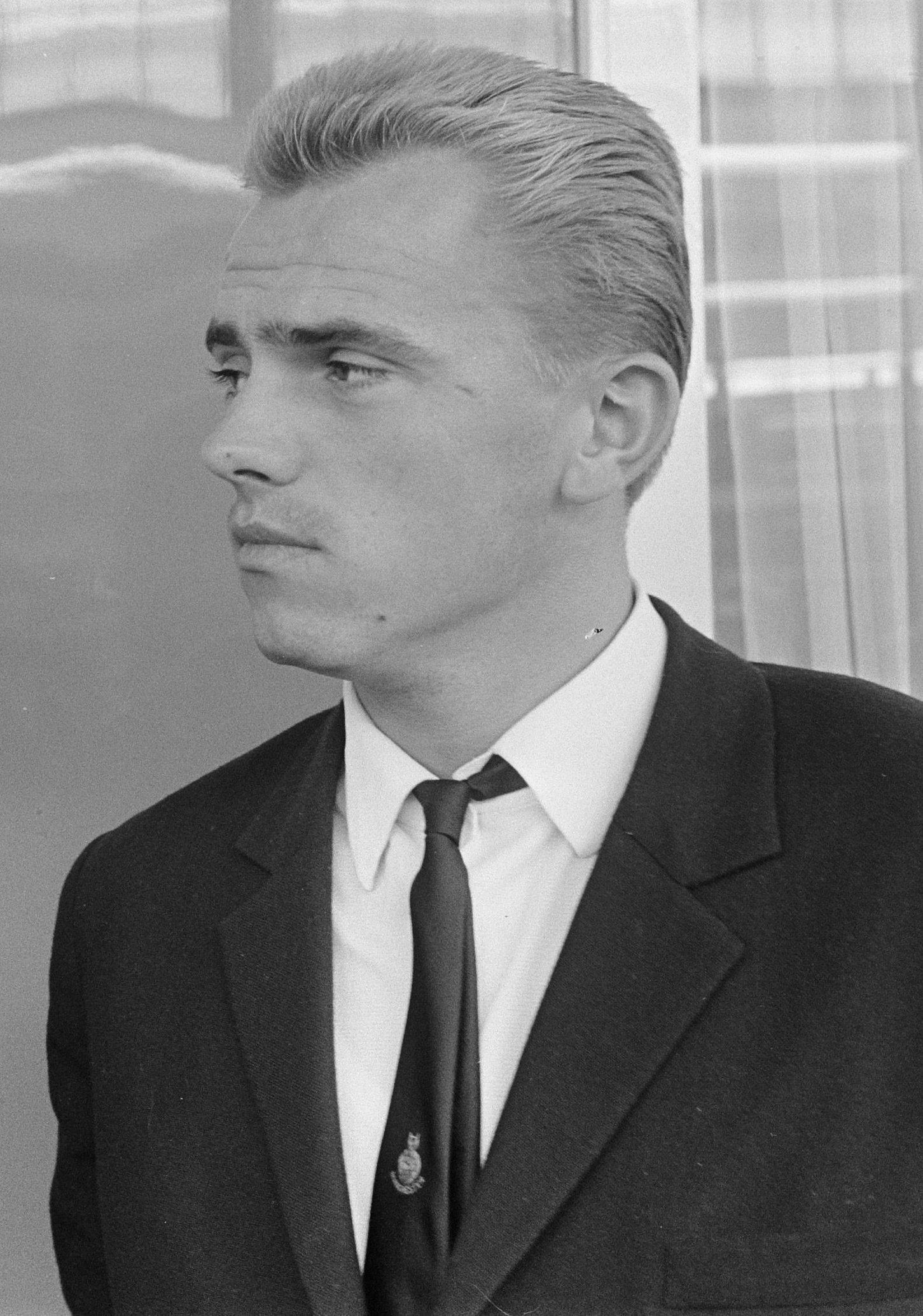
Club legend Kálmán Mészöly, who played for Vasas between 1952 and 1979

Vasas won the 1960–61 Nemzeti Bajnokság I season. As a consequence, Vasas were eligible to enter the 1961–62 European Cup. In the preliminary round, Vasas hosted Real Madrid C.F. and lost to 2–0 on 6 September in 1961 at Népstadion, Budapest. In the second leg of the preliminary round on 20 September 1961 Vasas lost to 3–1 at the Santiago Bernabéu Stadium, Madrid, Spain.

The following year Vasas could repeat the success by winning the 1961–62 Nemzeti Bajnokság I season. Vasas competed in the 1962–63 European Cup. In the preliminary round on 5 September 1962, Vasas beat Fredrikstad FK 4–1 at the Fredrikstad Stadion, Fredrikstad, Norway. In the second leg Vasas won 7–0 at the Népstadion, Budapest. Farkas scored a hat-trick in front of 6,648 spectators. On 14 November 1962, the 1961–62 Eredivisie champions Feyenoord hosted Vasas at the De Kuip in Rotterdam, the Netherlands. The match ended with a 1–1 draw in front of 53,700 spectators. On 18 November 1962 Vasas hosted Feyenoord at Népstadion in the second leg of the first round. The match ended with a 2–2 draw which resulted the farewell of the club from the 1962–63 European Cup.

The club third title arrived by winning the 1965 Nemzeti Bajnokság I season

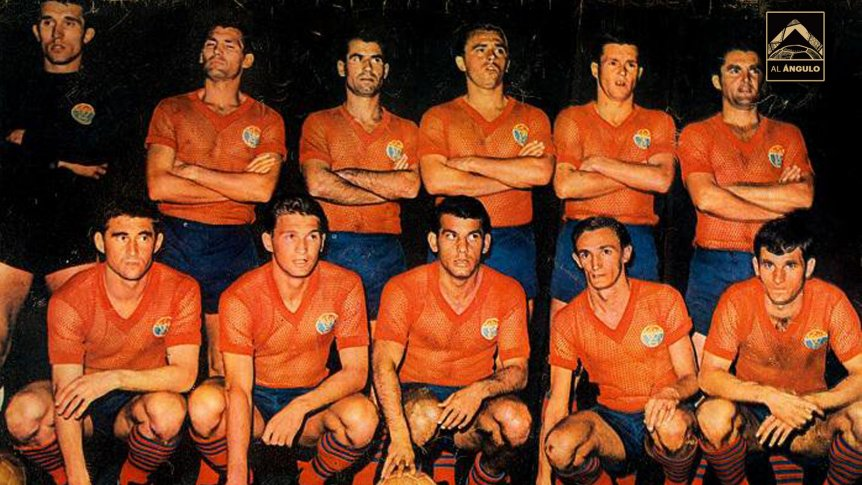
Vasas team that played in Argentina in 1968

In 1966 Vasas set a record by winning the 1966 Nemzeti Bajnokság I season without any defeats. Vasas competed in the 1966–67 European Cup. On 5 October 1966 Vasas beat Sporting 5–0 at the Népstadion in front of 65,218 spectators in the first round. On 12 October 1966, Vasas beat Sporting 2–0 at the José Alvalade Stadium, Lisbon, Portugal. Vasas qualified for the second round on 7–0 aggregate. On 16 November 1966, Vasas were hosted by 1965–66 Serie A champions Internazionale. The match was won by the Italian club 2–1 at the San Siro in front of 29,207 spectators. On 8 December 1966, Vasas were beaten by Internazionale 2–0 at the Népstadion in front of 67,013 spectators. Vasas were eliminated from the 1966–67 European Cup on 4–1 aggregate.

== 1970s ==
Vasas won the 1976–77 Nemzeti Bajnokság I season.

Vasas' football team belongs to the highest Hungarian football league and was the dominating force in Hungarian football during the 1960s. In the 2006–07 season Vasas finished 5th.

== 2000s ==
In 2006 the club would have been relegated as penultimate, but could retain its place as rivals Ferencváros were ousted instead due to financial irregularities. This would have been Vasas' second relegation in this decade.

== 2010s ==
On 3 August 2011, the club celebrated the 100th anniversary of their foundation with a match against Serie A club A.S. Roma at the Ferenc Puskás Stadium. The match ended with a 1–0 win for the Italian side. The only goal was scored by Viviani.

In the 2015–16 Nemzeti Bajnokság I season Vasas secured their Nemzeti Bajnokság I membership on the last match day (33rd) by beating MTK Budapest FC 2–0 at Dunaferr Arena resulting the farewell of Puskás Akadémia FC from the top league.

In the 2016–17 Nemzeti Bajnokság I season, Vasas finished third, although they were on the top of the league table during the winter break. As a consequence, Vasas qualified for the 2017–18 UEFA Europa League qualifying phase and play-off round season. In the first round Vasas SC were defeated by Beitar Jerusalem F.C. 4–3 at the HaMoshava Stadium on 29 June 2017.

== 2020s ==
In the 2020–21 Nemzeti Bajnokság II season, Vasas finished third and did not get promoted to the first division. Vasas were preceded by Debrecen and Gyirmót.

In the 2021–22 Nemzeti Bajnokság II, Vasas were promoted to the first division.

On 13 May 2023, Vasas was relegated from Nemzeti Bajnokság I after a 1-1 draw against Zalaegerszeg in the 2022–23 Nemzeti Bajnokság I season. On 13 May 2023, Miklós Nagy, sport director of Vasas, announced that on 15 May 2023 painful announcements would be expected. Right after the relegation to the second division, it was announced that the salaries would be reduced by 30%.

On 24 February 2024, Zoltán Gera was appointed as the coach of the club. His assistant coach became Csaba Csizmadia.

In the 2023–24 Magyar Kupa season, Vasas were eliminated by Paks in the quarter-finals in a 5-2 defeat at Illovszky Rudolf Stadion on 3 April 2024.

On 5 September 2024, Attila Pintér was appointed as the manager of the club.

On 20 October 2024, Pintér-led Vasas won their first match in the 2024–25 Nemzeti Bajnokság II season. Vasas beat Budapesti VSC 2-1 at home.

On 26 April 2026, Vasas secured their promotion to the first division after beating Videoton FC Fehérvár 2-0 at the Sóstói Stadion. Three days later, Gábor Erős, manager of Vasas, said that they would not build a new team for the first division.
