= 1953 Nemzeti Bajnokság I =

Nemzeti Bajnokság I
- Season: 1953
- Champions: Vörös Lobogó

Statistics of Nemzeti Bajnokság I in the 1953 season. With an average attendance of 31,000, Kinizsi recorded by far the highest average home league attendance.

== Overview ==
It was contested by 14 teams, and MTK Budapest won the championship.

== League standings ==
Pos	Team	Pld	W	D	L	GF	GA	GR	Pts
1	Vörös Lobogó	26	22	2	2	92	28	3.286	46
2	Budapest Honvéd FC	26	19	5	2	86	27	3.185	43
3	Vasas SC	26	14	4	8	62	37	1.676	32
4	Budapesti Dózsa	26	11	8	7	54	42	1.286	30
5	Budapesti Kinizsi	26	11	8	7	37	32	1.156	30
6	Győri Vasas	26	8	10	8	41	46	0.891	26
7	Szombathely Lokomotív	26	11	4	11	38	54	0.704	26
8	Szegedi Honvéd SE	26	8	7	11	31	42	0.738	23
9	Salgótarjáni BTC	26	8	7	11	32	46	0.696	23
10	Dorogi Bányász	26	7	7	12	36	48	0.750	21
11	Csepel SC	26	6	8	12	50	54	0.926	20
12	Sztálin Vasmű Épitok	26	5	9	12	32	49	0.653	19
13	Budapesti Postás SE	26	3	8	15	18	60	0.300	14
14	SORTEX	26	1	9	16	20	64	0.313	11

Source: rsssf.com

== Results ==
Home \ Away	CSE	DOR	DÓZ	GYŐ	HON	KIN	LOK	POS	SAL	SOR	SZE	SVÉ	VAS	VÖR
Csepel		0–2	2–3	4–2	1–5	3–3	3–2	2–2	0–1	1–1	1–1	3–1	1–2	4–5
Dorogi Bányász	2–2		0–0	1–1	0–2	0–1	2–0	1–0	0–0	1–1	0–1	1–2	2–4	0–10
Budapesti Dózsa	2–2	5–1		2–1	2–3	5–3	1–1	2–0	0–3	1–1	1–4	3–0	0–1	1–2
Győri Vasas	3–1	1–3	2–2		0–0	0–0	2–1	0–1	0–0	0–0	1–1	2–1	1–0	2–6
Budapest Honvéd	4–1	5–2	2–5	3–3		5–1	7–0	2–0	7–1	3–0	4–1	3–2	2–1	1–2
Budapesti Kinizsi	0–0	1–0	1–1	1–3	0–0		5–2	1–1	0–0	1–0	1–0	2–0	0–1	0–2
Lokomotiv Szombathely	0–0	1–0	0–1	3–1	0–6	1–0		1–0	1–4	3–2	1–4	2–2	1–7	2–4
Postás SE	1–0	1–8	1–6	1–2	0–7	3–4	0–2		1–1	1–1	0–0	1–1	0–4	1–2
Salgótarján	2–6	1–1	0–2	2–4	0–0	1–1	1–5	0–1		2–0	0–2	3–0	3–0	2–6
SORTEX	1–5	2–3	3–4	1–3	0–4	1–3	1–3	0–0	0–1		1–2	1–1	1–7	0–7
Szegedi Honvéd	1–4	1–3	4–1	2–2	0–4	0–4	0–2	0–0	2–0	0–0		1–1	1–2	0–5
Sztálin Vasmű Építők	4–2	1–1	2–2	2–2	0–1	0–1	0–0	1–0	3–1	1–2	2–1		1–1	2–4
Vasas	2–1	3–1	2–1	5–2	4–4	1–2	0–2	8–2	1–2	0–0	0–1	5–1		1–1
Vörös Lobogó	2–1	2–1	1–1	3–1	1–2	2–1	1–2	4–0	3–1	7–0	2–1	4–1	4–0	

Source: rsssf.com
Legend: Blue = home team win; Yellow = draw; Red = away team win.

== Statistical leaders ==
=== Top goalscorers ===
Rank	Scorer	Club	Goals
1	(Hungary) Ferenc Puskás	Budapest Honvéd	27
2	(Hungary) Sándor Kocsis	Budapest Honvéd	24
3	(Hungary) Nándor Hidegkuti	Vörös Lobogó	23
4	(Hungary) Lajos Csordás	Vasas SC	20
4	(Hungary) Károly Sándor	Vörös Lobogó	20
6	(Hungary) Lovász Béla	Csepel SC	18
6	(Hungary) Sándor Mátrai	Budapesti Kinizsi	18
6	(Hungary) Péter Palotás	Vörös Lobogó	18
9	(Hungary) Zoltán Czibor	Budapest Honvéd	16
10	(Hungary) Gyula Szilágyi	Vasas SC	15

== See also ==
- 1953 Nemzeti Bajnokság II
