= 1952 Nemzeti Bajnokság I =

Nemzeti Bajnokság I
- Season: 1952
- Champions: Budapest Honvéd FC

Statistics of Nemzeti Bajnokság I in the 1952 season. With an average attendance of 23,808, Kinizsi recorded the highest average home league attendance.

== Overview ==
It was contested by 14 teams, and Budapest Honvéd FC won the championship.

== League standings ==
Pos	Team	Pld	W	D	L	GF	GA	GR	Pts
1	Budapest Honvéd FC	26	21	5	0	88	21	4.190	47
2	Bp Bástya	26	20	5	1	96	33	2.909	45
3	Bp. Dózsa	26	14	8	4	67	43	1.558	36
4	Vasas SC	26	13	7	6	54	40	1.350	33
5	Csepel SC	26	11	3	12	52	53	0.981	25
6	Győri Vasas	26	9	5	12	51	57	0.895	23
7	Szombathely Lokomotív	26	8	7	11	34	48	0.708	23
8	Dorog	26	8	5	13	39	44	0.886	21
9	Bp Kinizsi	26	8	5	13	27	54	0.500	21
10	Salgótarjáni BTC	26	8	4	14	44	59	0.746	20
11	Szegedi Honvéd SE	26	7	5	14	37	52	0.712	19
12	Budapesti Postás SE	26	7	5	14	34	55	0.618	19
13	Diósgyőri VTK	26	6	4	16	31	64	0.484	16
14	SK Pécsi Lokomotív	26	4	8	14	24	55	0.436	16

Source: rsssf.com

== Results ==
Home \ Away	BÁS	CSE	DIÓ	DOR	DÓZ	GYŐ	HON	KIN	LSZ	POS	PRÉ	SAL	SZE	VAS
Budapesti Bástya		4–1	8–2	3–0	1–1	4–3	3–3	4–0	2–1	5–1	4–0	1–1	4–1	0–2
Csepel	2–5		0–0	1–4	1–2	3–2	2–5	1–3	3–0	0–0	1–2	4–0	1–0	2–4
Diósgyőr	1–5	1–0		0–0	0–7	2–3	0–3	3–0	0–3	3–2	0–2	2–5	0–1	1–5
Dorogi Bányász	3–5	0–2	0–0		1–3	4–0	0–2	5–0	2–2	1–0	0–0	1–1	0–3	0–2
Budapesti Dózsa	2–5	2–3	2–1	1–0		3–2	2–2	3–3	0–0	2–2	2–1	4–2	2–2	5–3
Győri Vasas	1–1	4–2	3–4	3–2	0–5		2–2	3–0	1–2	2–1	2–0	1–3	2–3	2–4
Budapest Honvéd	1–1	4–1	1–0	4–1	4–0	4–1		2–0	8–1	3–1	2–0	5–0	5–0	4–1
Budapesti Kinizsi	0–5	1–5	4–0	0–1	0–1	0–4	1–9		1–1	2–1	1–0	1–0	1–1	0–0
Lokomotiv Szombathely	3–5	0–2	2–0	2–4	4–4	1–0	0–0	0–3		2–1	4–1	3–1	1–0	0–2
Postás SE	1–4	3–1	3–2	3–0	0–6	1–1	1–4	2–4	1–0		0–2	0–4	1–1	0–2
Précis Lokomotív	0–5	3–4	1–1	3–2	1–3	2–2	0–3	0–2	0–0	2–2		0–6	0–4	1–1
Salgótarján	1–5	3–7	0–4	0–2	2–2	0–1	0–2	2–0	5–1	0–1	2–2		2–1	3–1
Szegedi Honvéd	2–5	0–2	0–3	1–4	1–2	1–3	2–3	1–0	1–0	0–3	1–1	5–1		2–4
Vasas	0–2	1–1	4–1	3–2	2–1	3–3	1–3	0–0	1–1	2–3	1–0	3–0	2–2	

Source: rsssf.com
Legend: Blue = home team win; Yellow = draw; Red = away team win.

== Statistical leaders ==
=== Top goalscorers ===
Rank	Scorer	Club	Goals
1	(Hungary) Sándor Kocsis	Budapest Honvéd	36
2	(Hungary) Nándor Hidegkuti	Budapesti Bástya	28
3	(Hungary) Péter Palotás	Budapesti Bástya	26
4	(Hungary) Ferenc Puskás	Budapest Honvéd	22
5	(Hungary) Ferenc Szusza	Budapesti Dózsa	19
6	(Hungary) Gyula Szilágyi	Budapesti Vasas	16
7	(Hungary) Ferenc Deák	Budapesti Dózsa	15
8	(Hungary) László Budai	Budapest Honvéd	14
8	(Hungary) Béla Csáki	Szegedi Honvéd	14
10	(Hungary) Ignác Kertesi	Győri Vasas	13
10	(Hungary) Béla Lovász	Csepel SC	13
10	(Hungary) József Molnár	Dorogi Bányász	13
10	(Hungary) József Opova	Salgótarjáni BTC	13
10	(Hungary) Károly Sándor	Budapesti Bástya	13

== Attendances ==
No.	Club	Average
1	Kinizsi	23,808
2	Dózsa	20,615
3	Bástya	20,077
4	Postás	14,846
5	Pécs	8,846
6	Szeged	8,308
7	Vasas	7,885
8	Honvéd	7,154
9	DVTK	7,000
10	Győr	6,462
11	Szombathely	5,500
12	Dorog	3,462
13	Sálgotarján	3,462
14	Csepel	3,385

== See also ==
- 1952 Nemzeti Bajnokság II
