= 1951 Nemzeti Bajnokság I =

Annual Hungarian soccer tournament

Nemzeti Bajnokság I
- Season: 1951
- Champions: Budapesti Bástya

Statistics of Nemzeti Bajnokság I in the 1951 season. With an average attendance of 20,000, Kinizsi recorded the highest average home league attendance.

== Overview ==
It was contested by 14 teams, and Bp Bástya won the championship.

== League standings ==
Pos	Team	Pld	W	D	L	GF	GA	GR	Pts
1	Budapesti Bástya	26	22	2	2	96	27	3.556	46
2	Budapest Honvéd FC	26	18	6	2	83	26	3.192	42
3	Budapesti Dózsa	26	12	7	7	64	44	1.455	31
4	Vasas SC	26	11	7	8	47	33	1.424	29
5	Csepel SC	26	12	5	9	45	38	1.184	29
6	Bp Kinizsi	26	13	3	10	43	42	1.024	29
7	Győri Vasas	26	9	8	9	47	43	1.093	26
8	Dorogi Bányász	26	10	6	10	44	45	0.978	26
9	Salgótarjáni BTC	26	7	7	12	33	47	0.702	21
10	Szegedi Honvéd SE	26	6	8	12	29	55	0.527	20
11	Diósgyőri VTK	26	6	7	13	31	52	0.596	19
12	Szombathelyi Haladás	26	8	2	16	29	59	0.492	18
13	SORTEX	26	7	4	15	19	48	0.396	18
14	Szegedi Petőfi	26	2	6	18	27	78	0.346	10

Source: rsssf.com

== Results ==
Home \ Away	BÁS	CSE	DIÓ	DOR	DÓZ	GYŐ	HON	KIN	LOK	SAL	SOR	SZH	SZP	VAS
Budapesti Bástya		3–1	5–2	2–2	1–2	3–2	1–0	6–1	1–0	5–2	5–0	5–0	6–2	3–0
Csepel	1–3		3–1	1–1	1–1	3–2	1–1	1–2	3–0	4–2	3–2	2–1	4–1	2–1
Diósgyőr	0–7	0–1		0–2	2–2	1–1	3–3	3–2	2–1	0–0	0–1	1–2	2–1	0–2
Dorogi Bányász	1–4	3–1	1–4		3–2	2–2	3–6	1–0	4–0	1–1	0–1	1–0	3–3	2–1
Budapesti Dózsa	2–4	3–0	3–1	0–2		2–2	2–3	1–2	5–3	1–0	1–0	2–2	9–1	1–2
Győri Vasas	+:- (Note: The match was settled by a goalless win for Győri Vasas.)	2–0	4–1	2–1	2–4		1–1	2–3	7–0	1–2	1–1	2–2	6–1	2–4
Budapest Honvéd	1–1	2–1	3–1	3–0	2–2	7–0		8–2	2–0	3–0	3–0	5–1	3–1	1–1
Budapesti Kinizsi	1–4	1–0	1–0	4–1	1–1	1–1	1–2		0–1	0–3	2–0	1–2	2–1	0–2
Lokomotiv Szombathely	1–4	0–2	3–1	2–1	2–3	2–0	0–7	1–2		1–3	0–1	1–1	1–1	2–1
Salgótarján	1–4	2–5	0–0	1–1	3–4	0–1	1–0	1–5	0–1		1–0	2–2	2–0	2–4
SORTEX	0–6	1–1	0–1	1–0	1–2	0–2	0–1	0–4	0–3	1–0		2–3	1–0	0–0
Szegedi Honvéd	1–3	1–1	1–1	1–3	2–1	0–1	1–8	0–3	2–0	1–1	0–3		2–2	0–2
Szegedi Petőfi	2–7	1–3	2–2	1–4	0–6	1–0	1–4	0–2	0–4	1–2	1–1	2–0		0–0
Vasas	2–3	1–0	1–2	2–1	2–2	1–1	1–4	0–0	6–0	1–1	8–2	0–1	2–1	

Source: rsssf.com
Legend: Blue = home team win; Yellow = draw; Red = away team win.

== Statistical leaders ==
=== Top goalscorers ===
Rank	Scorer	Club	Goals
1	(Hungary) Sándor Kocsis	Budapest Honvéd	30
2	(Hungary) Péter Palotás	Budapesti Bástya	25
3	(Hungary) Ferenc Szusza	Budapesti Dózsa	22
4	(Hungary) Nándor Hidegkuti	Budapesti Bástya	21
4	(Hungary) Ferenc Puskás	Budapest Honvéd	21
6	(Hungary) Gyula Szilágyi	Vasas SC	18
7	(Hungary) Károly Sándor	Budapesti Bástya	17
8	(Hungary) Ferenc Csuberda	Salgótarjáni BTC	14
9	(Hungary) Gusztáv Aspirány	Dorogi Bányász	13
9	(Hungary) János Csorba	Diósgyőri VTK	13
9	(Hungary) Ferenc Pális	Győri Vasas	13

== See also ==
- 1951 Nemzeti Bajnokság II
