= 1954 Nemzeti Bajnokság I =

Nemzeti Bajnokság I
- Season: 1954
- Champions: Budapest Honvéd FC

Statistics of Nemzeti Bajnokság I in the 1954 season. With an average attendance of 35,692, Kinizsi recorded by far the highest average home league attendance.

== Overview ==
It was contested by 14 teams, and Budapest Honvéd FC won the championship.

== League standings ==
Pos	Team	Pld	W	D	L	GF	GA	GR	Pts
1	Budapest Honvéd FC (C)	26	19	2	5	100	43	2.326	40
2	Vörös Lobogó	26	16	3	7	82	34	2.412	35
3	Bp Kinizsi	26	16	1	9	54	31	1.742	33
4	Vasas SC	26	11	7	8	49	51	0.961	29
5	Bp. Dózsa	26	11	4	11	54	49	1.102	26
6	Dorogi Bányász	26	7	11	8	39	42	0.929	25
7	Győri Vasas	26	9	7	10	43	51	0.843	25
8	ÚTE Izzó	26	7	11	8	30	41	0.732	25
9	Diósgyőri VTK	26	10	3	13	49	61	0.803	23
10	Szombathely Lokomotív	26	8	7	11	32	49	0.653	23
11	Salgótarjáni BTC	26	9	4	13	30	46	0.652	22
12	Csepel SC	26	6	10	10	33	51	0.647	22
13	Szegedi Haladás	26	7	6	13	37	63	0.587	20
14	Sztálin Vasmű Épitok	26	6	4	16	37	57	0.649	16

Source: rsssf.com
(C) Champions

== Results ==
Home \ Away	CSE	DIÓ	DOR	DÓZ	GYŐ	HON	KIN	LOK	SAL	SZE	SVÉ	ÚTE	VAS	VÖR
Csepel		3–4	2–2	2–4	2–4	3–5	1–0	0–0	0–0	2–4	3–2	0–0	4–3	0–5
Diósgyőr	5–1		1–4	3–2	1–2	1–6	0–2	1–2	2–0	0–3	3–2	6–0	2–2	1–2
Dorogi Bányász	0–0	1–1		2–0	3–3	2–1	1–2	3–0	2–4	2–2	4–1	1–2	1–2	0–1
Budapesti Dózsa	0–0	1–1	4–1		2–3	5–4	4–1	2–1	1–1	2–6	1–3	1–1	1–3	1–2
Győri Vasas	0–0	0–3	1–1	0–2		3–1	1–2	4–2	2–2	0–1	3–4	3–1	0–4	0–3
Budapest Honvéd	4–3	4–0	8–0	2–1	1–2		2–0	4–1	3–1	5–1	3–0	4–0	6–1	1–1
Budapesti Kinizsi	3–0	2–0	1–2	3–2	2–3	1–3		1–2	4–0	0–1	4–2	1–1	2–0	2–0
Lokomotiv Szombathely	0–1	0–3	1–1	4–3	2–1	2–1	0–2		0–0	0–1	1–1	1–1	1–1	2–1
Salgótarján	0–1	3–0	0–3	0–4	0–2	1–6	2–1	1–2		2–1	0–1	0–2	3–1	1–0
Szegedi Haladás	0–0	1–2	0–0	1–3	0–0	2–7	2–3	4–2	2–4		0–3	0–0	0–0	0–14
Sztálin Vasmű Építők	0–2	2–4	1–1	0–2	2–2	0–2	0–4	2–4	0–1	4–0		3–0	1–1	3–5
ÚTE Izzó	0–0	5–2	1–1	1–3	3–3	2–2	0–3	3–0	0–1	3–2	1–0		1–3	1–0
Vasas	2–2	4–2	0–0	4–2	2–1	3–6	1–5	6–1	3–1	1–0	1–0	1–1		0–5
Vörös Lobogó	4–1	7–1	3–1	0–1	5–0	7–9	1–3	1–1	3–2	4–3	5–0	0–0	3–0	

Source: rsssf.com
Legend: Blue = home team win; Yellow = draw; Red = away team win.

== Statistical leaders ==
=== Top goalscorers ===
Rank	Scorer	Club	Goals
1	(Hungary) Sándor Kocsis	Budapest Honvéd	33
2	(Hungary) Ferenc Puskás	Budapest Honvéd	21
3	(Hungary) Péter Palotás	Vörös Lobogó	19
4	(Hungary) Nándor Hidegkuti	Vörös Lobogó	18
4	(Hungary) Károly Sándor	Vörös Lobogó	18
6	(Hungary) Lajos Csordás	Vasas SC	16
6	(Hungary) Zoltán Dobó	Diósgyőri VTK	16
6	(Hungary) Ferenc Szusza	Budapesti Dózsa	16
9	(Hungary) László Fejes	Sztálin Vasmű Építők	14
10	(Hungary) Lajos Rózsavölgyi	Szegedi Haladás	13
10	(Hungary) Gyula Szilágyi	Vasas SC	13

== See also ==
- 1954 Nemzeti Bajnokság II
