= 1959–60 Nemzeti Bajnokság I =

Nemzeti Bajnokság I
- Season: 1959–60

Final standings of the Hungarian League 1959/1960 season

== Final standings ==
Pos	Team	Pld	W	D	L	GF	GA	GR	Pts	Qualification or relegation
1	Újpesti Dózsa	26	17	6	3	52	26	2.000	40	Champions
2	FTC	26	14	7	5	56	31	1.806	35	
3	Vasas SC	26	12	8	6	44	29	1.517	32	
4	MTK	26	10	9	7	47	35	1.343	29	
5	Diósgyőri VTK	26	10	7	9	35	30	1.167	27	
6	Tatabányai Bányász	26	10	7	9	33	32	1.031	27	
7	Bp. Honvéd	26	9	7	10	48	44	1.091	25	
8	Szegedi EAC	26	9	7	10	33	37	0.892	25	
9	Salgótarjáni BTC	26	7	9	10	31	34	0.912	23	
10	Dorogi Bányász	26	6	11	9	32	43	0.744	23	
11	Pécsi Dózsa	26	8	7	11	35	52	0.673	23	
12	Csepel	26	8	4	14	23	40	0.575	20	
13	Haladás	26	6	7	13	32	47	0.681	19	Relegated to NB II
14	BVSC	26	3	10	13	27	48	0.563	16	Relegated to NB II

Source: rsssf.com

== Results ==
Home \ Away	BVS	CSE	DIÓ	DOR	FTC	HAL	HON	MTK	PÉC	SAL	SZE	TAT	ÚJP	VAS
BVSC		0–1	0–0	0–2	1–4	2–1	2–2	2–2	1–2	1–1	4–1	1–1	0–3	1–3
Csepel	0–0		0–2	1–0	1–2	2–0	1–3	1–1	2–1	0–2	0–1	2–1	0–5	1–0
Diósgyőr	1–1	2–1		2–0	2–1	1–0	0–2	1–0	5–0	1–1	3–1	0–2	0–0	0–0
Dorogi Bányász	2–2	5–1	2–0		1–7	2–0	1–4	1–3	1–1	3–1	1–1	0–0	0–0	2–1
Ferencváros	5–1	1–0	2–1	5–3		2–0	3–2	0–2	4–0	3–1	0–0	1–1	0–1	2–2
Haladás	3–2	2–0	3–2	1–1	1–1		1–1	1–1	2–0	2–2	0–1	2–0	1–3	2–4
Budapest Honvéd	1–1	0–0	3–2	5–1	2–2	2–2		3–2	4–3	3–2	0–1	3–5	1–2	0–1
MTK Budapest	3–1	1–2	1–0	1–1	1–0	5–2	3–0		3–0	4–3	1–1	0–1	0–0	1–0
Pécsi Dózsa	0–1	1–1	2–1	1–1	3–2	2–1	1–1	3–3		3–1	3–2	1–0	3–2	1–2
Salgótarján	2–1	0–1	1–2	0–0	1–1	1–1	1–0	2–1	1–1		2–0	3–2	0–1	0–0
Szegedi EAC	3–0	1–0	2–3	1–1	0–1	4–1	1–0	2–2	4–1	0–3		1–0	1–2	1–1
Tatabányai Bányász	1–1	2–1	2–1	2–0	2–4	2–0	1–0	1–0	2–0	0–0	2–2		1–2	0–3
Újpesti Dózsa	2–0	4–2	2–2	0–0	0–1	3–1	3–2	5–4	4–1	1–0	3–1	2–2		2–0
Vasas	2–1	3–2	1–1	3–1	2–2	1–2	2–4	2–2	1–1	2–0	3–0	2–0	3–0	

Source: rsssf.com
Legend: Blue = home team win; Yellow = draw; Red = away team win.

== Statistical leaders ==
=== Top goalscorers ===
Rank	Scorer	Club	Goals
1	(Hungary) Flórián Albert	Ferencvárosi TC	27
2	(Hungary) Lajos Tichy	Budapest Honvéd	26
3	(Hungary) János Dunai	Pécsi Dózsa	15
3	(Hungary) Ferenc Szusza	Újpesti Dózsa	15
5	(Hungary) János Göröcs	Újpesti Dózsa	14
6	(Hungary) Pál Orosz	Ferencvárosi TC	13
6	(Hungary) Károly Sándor	MTK Budapest	13
8	(Hungary) Gyula Szilágyi	Vasas SC	11
9	(Hungary) László Bödör	MTK Budapest	10
9	(Hungary) László Pál	Diósgyőri Vasas	10
9	(Hungary) László Lahos	Tatabányai Bányász	10
9	(Hungary) Imre Sátori	Csepel SC	10

== Attendances ==
No.	Club	Average
1	Ferencváros	49,308
2	Vasas	23,000
3	Újpest	20,615
4	Honvéd	20,154
5	MTK	19,692
6	DVTK	15,385
7	Pécs	15,385
8	Szeged	13,846
9	BVSC	12,769
10	Tatabánya	12,308
11	Haladás	10,154
12	Csepel	9,769
13	Dorog	6,038
14	Salgótarján	5,923
