= List of sports rivalries in Hungary =

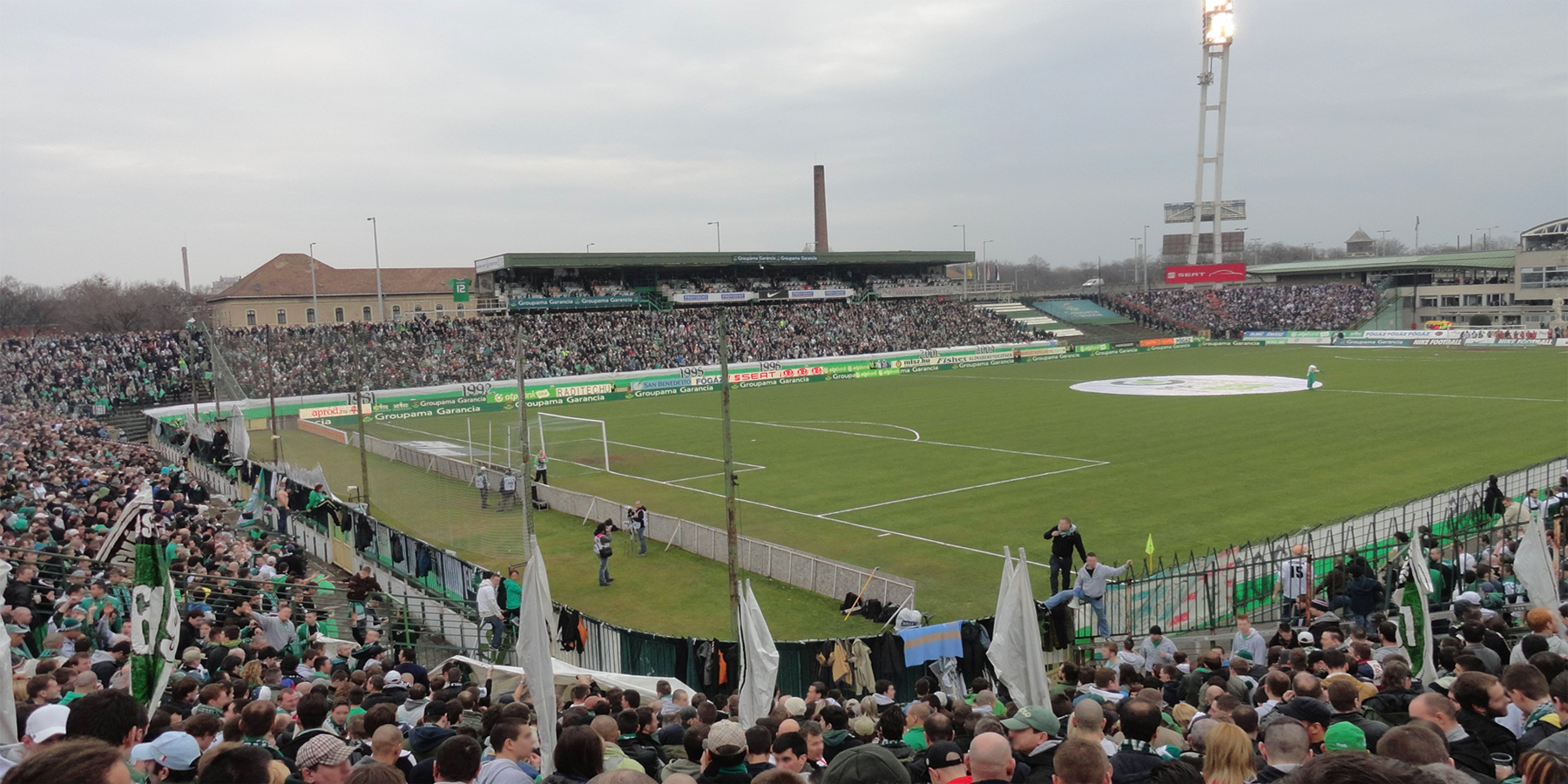
The derby between Ferencváros and Újpest is widely considered the greatest in Hungarian sports.

This is a list of the main sporting local derbies and other sports rivalries in Hungary.

== Association football ==
This is a list of the main association football rivalries in Hungary:

== Budapest derbies ==
=== Ferencváros Vs. Újpest ===
  - ''Ferencvárosi TC–Újpest FC rivalry''
  - (The derby): Ferencváros vs. Újpest

=== Örökrangadó ===
''Örökrangadó'': Ferencváros vs. MTK Budapest The Örökrangadó, meaning "Eternal derby" is a fixture played between Ferencváros, and MTK.

== Western derbies ==
=== Szombathelyi Haladás–Zalaegerszegi TE rivalry ===
Szombathelyi Haladás vs. Zalaegerszeg Two of the biggest teams in the Western part of the country, Haladás and Zalaegerszeg consider each other their biggest rivals.

  - Fejér County derby: Fehérvár vs. Puskás Akadémia

== Eastern derbies ==
=== Debreceni VSC vs. Diósgyőri VTK ===
Debreceni VSC and Diósgyőri VTK are the two most decorated teams in eastern Hungary. Due to the teams' matching colours, red and white, and their shared hatred of Ferencváros, Újpest and Nyíregyháza, the fans of the respective clubs maintain an amicable and friendly relationship. DVSC were founded in 1902, while DVTK were born in 1910. Both teams dominated their respective divisions of the county championship, with Debrecen winning the Eastern division of the county championship 6 times between 1918 and 1926. Likewise, Diósgyőr were champions of the Northern division, and later of the eastern Hungarian 1st division (which counts as a 2nd division trophy) 16 times between 1912 and 1937.

=== Borsod–Abaúj–Zemplén County derby ===
Diósgyőr vs. Mezőkövesd

Diósgyőr are the most successful club of Borsod county (and the entire North-East of Hungary), having won 12 second division titles, 2 Hungarian cups and a leaguecup. Mezőkövesd were founded in 1979, and reached the first division for the first time in 2013. A widespread chant which can be heard during any DVTK fixture, especially during the Borsod-county derby, which goes:"Borsod-county is red and white", referring to the colours of the team.

- Debrecen derby: Debreceni VSC vs. Debreceni EAC

== Inter-regional rivalries ==
=== Ferencvárosi TC–Debreceni VSC rivalry ===
Ferencváros vs. Debrecen

Despite being located over 230 kilometres apart, Ferencváros and Debreceni VSC contest a fierce rivalry. They have played each other in over 100 top-flight games, with the side from the capital winning 50 of them, while Debrecen won 28 of them.

== Handball ==
Men's handball

- Handball Derby of Hungary: Veszprém vs. Szeged: the two most successful teams in Hungary.

Women's handball

- Handball Derby of Hungary: Ferencváros vs. Győr
- Ferencvárosi TC–Debreceni VSC rivalry: Ferencváros vs. Debrecen

== Basketball ==
Men's basketball

- Western derbies:
  - Vas County derby (Vasi El Clásico): Falco Szombathely vs. Körmend
  - Zalaegerszeg vs. Falco Szombathely
- Szolnoki Olajbányász–Falco KC Szombathely rivalry: Szolnoki Olajbányász vs. Falco Szombathely

Women's basketball

  - Győr-Moson-Sopron County derby: Győr vs. Sopron

== Water polo ==
- Budapest derbies: Any match between Ferencváros or Vasas vs. Honvéd or BVSC–Zugló or OSC
- Csongrád-Csanád County derby: Szeged vs. Szentes

== Ice hockey ==
- Ferencvárosi TC–Újpest FC rivalry (The derby): Ferencváros vs. Újpest
