= Szegedi Honvéd SE =

Association football club in Hungary

- Full name: Szegedi Honvéd Sport Egyesület
- Founded: 1939
- Dissolved: 1972
| Home colours | Away colours |

Szegedi Honvéd SE was a Hungarian football club from the town of Szeged.

== History ==
Szegedi Honvéd SE debuted in the 1951 season of the Hungarian League and finished tenth. They were dissolved in 1953 and replaced in the Hungarian League by Szegedi EAC.

== Names ==
- 1939–1945: Szegedi Honvédtiszthelyettes Altiszti Sportegyesület
- 1945–1946: Szegedi Toldi
- 1946: merger with Szegedi TK
- 1946–1949: Szegedi Honvéd TK
- 1949–1953: Szegedi Honvéd SE
- 1953: dissolved
- 1955: refounded
- 1955–1959: Szegedi Honvéd SE
- 1959–1972: Honvéd Kossuth Lajos SE

== Honours ==
=== Domestic ===
- Nemzeti Bajnokság II
  - Winners (1): 1950
- Nemzeti Bajnokság III:
  - Winners (1): 1949–50

== Seasons ==
The table below shows the seasons of Szegedi Honvéd SE.

| Season | Tier | Club's name | Position | Pts |
|---|---|---|---|---|
| 1931–32 | 3 | Szegedi Honvéd TKSE | 8 / 8 | 2 |
| 1932–33 | 3 | Szegedi Honvéd TKSE | 9 / 9 | |
| 1933–34 | 3 | Honvéd TKSE | 0 / 13 | |
| 1938–39 | 4 | Szegedi Honvéd TK | 10 / 10 | 10 |
| 1939–40 | 4 | Szegedi HASE | 0 / 8 | |
| 1940–41 | 5 | Szegedi HASE | 2 / 9 | 22 |
| 1941–42 | 5 | Szegedi HASE | 2 / 10 | 14 |
| 1942–43 | 4 | Szegedi HASE | 1 / 12 | 40 |
| 1943–44 | 3 | Szegedi HASE | 3 / 14 | 37 |
| 1944–45 | 2 | Szegedi HASE | 2 / 16 | 7 |
| 1944–45 | 2 | Szegedi HASE | 0 / 13 | |
| 1945–46 | 2 | Szegedi Toldi | 5 / 14 | 35 |
| 1946–47 | 3 | Honvéd TK (Szeged) | 5 / 14 | 31 |
| 1947–48 | 3 | Szegedi Honvéd TK | 3 / 14 | 38 |
| 1948–49 | 3 | Szegedi Honvéd TK | 7 / 16 | 33 |
| 1949–50 | 3 | Szegedi Honvéd SE | 1 / 16 | 45 |
| 1950 | 2 | Szegedi Honvéd SE | 1 / 16 | 22 |
| 1951 | 1 | Szegedi Honvéd | 10 / 14 | 20 |
| 1952 | 1 | Szegedi Honvéd | 11 / 14 | 19 |
| 1953 | 1 | Szegedi Honvéd SE | 8 / 14 | 23 |
