= 1962–63 Nemzeti Bajnokság I =

Nemzeti Bajnokság I
- Season: 1962–63

Statistics of Nemzeti Bajnokság I in the 1962–63 season.

== Overview ==
It was contested by 14 teams, and Ferencvárosi TC won the championship.

== League standings ==
Pos	Team	Pld	W	D	L	GF	GA	GR	Pts
1	Ferencvárosi TC	26	15	7	4	49	28	1.750	37
2	MTK Budapest FC	26	11	9	6	41	32	1.281	31
3	Újpesti Dózsa	26	11	8	7	50	31	1.613	30
4	Dorogi Bányasz	26	10	10	6	37	27	1.370	30
5	Budapest Honvéd FC	26	11	7	8	53	38	1.395	29
6	Győri ETO FC	26	12	5	9	42	37	1.135	29
7	Pécsi Dózsa	26	8	11	7	34	31	1.097	27
8	FC Tatabánya	26	10	7	9	30	30	1.000	27
9	Vasas SC	26	8	9	9	37	31	1.194	25
10	Komlói Bányász SK	26	7	10	9	30	41	0.732	24
11	Szegedi EAC	26	8	7	11	18	41	0.439	23
12	Debreceni VSC	26	6	9	11	31	50	0.620	21
13	Salgótarjáni BTC	26	6	6	14	29	38	0.763	18
14	Szombathelyi Haladás	26	4	5	17	23	49	0.469	13

Source: rsssf.com

== Results ==
Home \ Away	DEB	DOR	FTC	GYŐ	HAL	HON	KOM	MTK	PÉC	SAL	SZE	TAT	ÚJP	VAS
Debrecen		2–1	2–2	1–1	4–3	0–2	1–3	2–2	2–4	1–1	0–2	1–1	4–1	1–1
Dorogi Bányász	5–1		0–1	1–0	0–0	2–0	0–0	4–1	1–2	0–0	0–0	1–1	2–0	3–2
Ferencváros	2–0	1–1		5–3	3–0	2–3	3–1	0–1	3–3	3–2	3–1	1–0	2–2	2–2
Győr	1–1	0–1	2–2		2–1	2–1	1–0	0–3	1–0	6–1	3–1	1–0	3–0	2–1
Haladás	0–1	1–4	0–2	3–4		1–1	1–0	0–2	1–0	2–0	0–1	1–1	0–6	0–0
Budapest Honvéd	2–0	4–1	0–1	1–2	3–2		2–2	1–1	6–0	1–0	4–1	3–0	2–3	1–2
Komlói Bányász	3–0	1–1	0–2	1–0	3–3	2–5		2–1	3–2	1–1	3–1	0–0	0–0	1–0
MTK Budapest	2–3	0–0	1–1	2–1	1–2	2–2	2–2		0–0	2–0	7–0	2–1	2–1	3–2
Pécsi Dózsa	0–0	2–1	0–1	2–2	2–0	2–2	2–0	0–0		4–0	0–1	1–1	0–0	0–0
Salgótarján	4–0	1–2	1–2	4–2	1–0	1–3	1–1	0–1	0–1		5–0	3–0	0–0	1–0
Szegedi EAC	2–0	0–2	1–0	0–0	1–0	0–0	0–0	0–0	2–2	2–0		0–2	0–0	2–1
Tatabányai Bányász	2–0	0–0	0–3	1–2	3–0	4–2	3–0	2–1	3–1	1–0	1–0		2–0	1–1
Újpesti Dózsa	2–2	2–2	0–2	2–0	2–1	4–1	7–1	5–0	0–3	2–1	4–0	4–0		2–0
Vasas	1–2	5–2	2–0	2–1	2–1	1–1	2–0	1–2	1–1	1–1	4–0	2–0	1–1	

Source: rsssf.com
Legend: Blue = home team win; Yellow = draw; Red = away team win.

== Statistical leaders ==
=== Top goalscorers ===
Rank	Scorer	Club	Goals
1	(Hungary) Ferenc Bene	Újpesti Dózsa	23
2	(Hungary) Lajos Tichy	Budapest Honvéd	20
3	(Hungary) László Povázsai	Győri Vasas ETO	16
4	(Hungary) Ferenc Machos	Vasas SC	14
5	(Hungary) Flórián Albert	Ferencvárosi TC	11
5	(Hungary) László Bödör	MTK Budapest	11
5	(Hungary) Antal Dunai	Pécsi Dózsa	11
5	(Hungary) Tivadar Monostori	Dorogi Bányász	11
9	(Hungary) Lajos Puskás	Debreceni VSC	10

== Attendances ==
#	Club	Average
1	Ferencváros	34,308
2	Vasas	21,846
3	MTK	18,538
4	Újpest	17,615
5	Budapest Honvéd	15,846
6	Pécs	14,538
7	Debrecen	14,538
8	Szeged	11,615
9	Haladás	11,154
10	Győr	9,692
11	Tatabánya	9,462
12	Dorog	7,038
13	Salgótarján	6,538
14	Komlói Bányász	5,000
