= 1961–62 Nemzeti Bajnokság I =

Nemzeti Bajnokság I
- Season: 1961–62

Statistics of Nemzeti Bajnokság I in the 1961–62 season.

== Overview ==
It was contested by 14 teams, and Vasas SC won the championship.

== League standings ==
Pos	Team	Pld	W	D	L	GF	GA	GR	Pts
1	Vasas SC	26	17	4	5	55	27	2.037	38
2	Újpesti Dózsa	26	15	6	5	57	30	1.900	36
3	Ferencvárosi TC	26	13	7	6	45	26	1.731	33
4	FC Tatabánya	26	12	7	7	39	28	1.393	31
5	MTK Budapest FC	26	11	6	9	55	44	1.250	28
6	Dorog	26	10	7	9	32	34	0.941	27
7	Budapest Honvéd FC	26	10	6	10	43	39	1.103	26
8	Pécsi Dózsa	26	9	4	13	34	40	0.850	22
9	Szegedi EAC	26	6	10	10	30	38	0.789	22
10	Győri ETO FC	26	6	10	10	30	44	0.682	22
11	Salgótarjáni BTC	26	6	9	11	33	40	0.825	21
12	Komlói Bányász SK	26	7	7	12	31	44	0.705	21
13	Ózdi Kohász SE	26	9	3	14	37	62	0.597	21
14	Csepel SC	26	5	6	15	30	55	0.545	16

Source: rsssf.com

== Results ==
Home \ Away	CSE	DOR	FTC	GYŐ	HON	KOM	MTK	ÓZD	PÉC	SAL	SZE	TAT	ÚJP	VAS
Csepel		1–2	1–1	1–1	1–2	3–2	3–1	2–3	4–2	0–4	1–1	0–0	0–0	0–2
Dorogi Bányász	2–0		1–1	1–2	1–3	0–1	2–1	0–0	2–0	3–2	1–2	3–2	0–1	4–2
Ferencváros	4–0	2–0		1–0	3–0	3–0	3–2	4–1	2–2	2–0	2–1	0–2	1–2	2–3
Győr	1–4	1–1	0–0		2–2	4–0	2–2	2–0	1–1	2–1	1–0	0–0	2–5	1–1
Budapest Honvéd	4–1	0–0	1–2	3–0		5–0	0–1	3–2	1–0	4–2	1–2	2–1	3–0	0–1
Komlói Bányász	3–1	0–1	2–2	1–1	0–0		0–2	5–0	1–0	0–0	2–2	1–0	2–2	0–1
MTK Budapest	1–2	0–1	3–2	4–2	4–1	4–0		3–0	2–0	5–1	2–2	2–1	4–3	2–2
Ózdi Kohász	5–0	2–1	0–1	3–2	3–1	4–3	3–2		2–5	1–1	2–1	1–1	0–4	2–1
Pécsi Dózsa	1–0	3–0	2–1	1–0	0–0	0–1	2–0	4–0		0–2	1–0	1–2	1–1	3–2
Salgótarján	1–0	1–1	0–0	2–0	3–3	1–1	2–2	3–1	3–1		0–0	0–0	2–3	0–1
Szegedi EAC	1–1	1–2	1–2	1–1	1–1	1–2	2–2	2–0	3–1	3–1		1–1	1–0	0–0
Tatabányai Bányász	4–1	2–2	0–0	2–0	2–1	3–2	3–0	5–1	3–1	1–0	3–0		0–2	1–0
Újpesti Dózsa	4–2	1–1	2–1	0–2	4–0	2–1	3–3	2–1	3–0	4–1	4–0	4–0		0–0
Vasas	3–1	3–0	0–3	7–0	3–2	2–1	2–1	4–0	4–2	2–0	4–1	3–0	2–1	

Source: rsssf.com
Legend: Blue = home team win; Yellow = draw; Red = away team win.

== Statistical leaders ==
=== Top goalscorers ===
Rank	Scorer	Club	Goals
1	(Hungary) Lajos Tichy	Budapest Honvéd	23
2	(Hungary) Tibor Csernai	Ózdi Kohász SE	19
3	(Hungary) Flórián Albert	Ferencvárosi TC	17
3	(Hungary) Károly Sándor	MTK Budapest	17
5	(Hungary) János Göröcs	Újpesti Dózsa	14
6	(Hungary) László Kalmár	Csepel SC	13
6	(Hungary) László Lahos	Tatabányai Bányász	13
6	(Hungary) Károly Palotai	Győri Vasas ETO	13
6	(Hungary) Ernő Solymosi	Újpesti Dózsa	13
6	(Hungary) Antal Dunai	Pécsi Dózsa	13
6	(Hungary) Béla Kuharszki	Újpesti Dózsa	13

== Attendances ==
#	Club	Average
1	Ferencváros	30,000
2	Budapest Honvéd	17,231
3	Vasas	16,769
4	Újpest	16,154
5	MTK	14,692
6	Pécs	14,462
7	Szeged	12,462
8	Tatabánya	11,538
9	Ózd	10,692
10	Győr	9,654
11	Csepel	7,615
12	Dorog	6,385
13	Salgótarján	6,308
14	Komlói Bányász	6,038
