= 1960–61 Nemzeti Bajnokság I =

Nemzeti Bajnokság I
- Season: 1960–61

Statistics of Nemzeti Bajnokság I in the 1960–61 season.

== Overview ==
It was contested by 14 teams, and Vasas SC won the championship.

== League standings ==
| Pos | Team | Pld | W | D | L | GF | GA | GR | Pts |
|---|---|---|---|---|---|---|---|---|---|
| 1 | Vasas SC | 26 | 15 | 8 | 3 | 59 | 24 | 2.458 | 38 |
| 2 | Újpesti Dózsa | 26 | 14 | 6 | 6 | 51 | 30 | 1.700 | 34 |
| 3 | MTK Budapest FC | 26 | 13 | 6 | 7 | 53 | 42 | 1.262 | 32 |
| 4 | Ferencvárosi TC | 26 | 13 | 5 | 8 | 56 | 34 | 1.647 | 31 |
| 5 | Salgótarjáni BTC | 26 | 13 | 5 | 8 | 44 | 33 | 1.333 | 31 |
| 6 | Szegedi EAC | 26 | 9 | 11 | 6 | 39 | 44 | 0.886 | 29 |
| 7 | FC Tatabánya | 26 | 9 | 9 | 8 | 33 | 33 | 1.000 | 27 |
| 8 | Győri ETO FC | 26 | 9 | 7 | 10 | 43 | 31 | 1.387 | 25 |
| 9 | Budapest Honvéd FC | 26 | 7 | 10 | 9 | 41 | 43 | 0.953 | 24 |
| 10 | Csepel SC | 26 | 6 | 10 | 10 | 24 | 39 | 0.615 | 22 |
| 11 | Pécsi Dózsa | 26 | 6 | 9 | 11 | 34 | 42 | 0.810 | 21 |
| 12 | Dorog | 26 | 6 | 7 | 13 | 36 | 50 | 0.720 | 19 |
| 13 | Debreceni VSC | 26 | 7 | 5 | 14 | 33 | 61 | 0.541 | 19 |
| 14 | Diósgyőri VTK | 26 | 3 | 6 | 17 | 25 | 65 | 0.385 | 12 |

Source: rsssf.com

== Results ==
| Home \ Away | CSE | DEB | DIÓ | DOR | FTC | GYŐ | HON | MTK | PÉC | SAL | SZE | TAT | ÚJP | VAS |
|---|---|---|---|---|---|---|---|---|---|---|---|---|---|---|
| Csepel | | 0–0 | 1–1 | 2–2 | 1–1 | 1–0 | 3–2 | 1–2 | 2–2 | 1–3 | 2–2 | 1–0 | 1–2 | 1–1 |
| Debrecen | 2–0 | | 3–0 | 1–3 | 2–1 | 2–7 | 2–1 | 0–3 | 0–1 | 2–4 | 2–2 | 1–0 | 0–1 | 1–1 |
| Diósgyőr | 0–1 | 4–7 | | 1–0 | 2–0 | 0–2 | 2–2 | 0–4 | 1–3 | 1–1 | 0–1 | 1–2 | 1–1 | 1–4 |
| Dorogi Bányász | 2–2 | 5–2 | 2–1 | | 2–5 | 1–1 | 2–1 | 1–2 | 3–1 | 0–3 | 1–1 | 1–1 | 0–4 | 1–2 |
| Ferencváros | 2–0 | 7–0 | 5–0 | 3–1 | | 3–2 | 0–0 | 4–1 | 3–2 | 4–1 | 4–0 | 2–2 | 2–0 | 0–0 |
| Győr | 1–0 | 0–0 | 1–1 | 2–3 | 2–0 | | 2–1 | 5–2 | 1–1 | 1–0 | 5–0 | 0–0 | 2–0 | 0–1 |
| Budapest Honvéd | 0–0 | 3–4 | 2–1 | 3–2 | 4–2 | 1–0 | | 1–1 | 4–2 | 3–1 | 3–3 | 3–2 | 1–1 | 1–2 |
| MTK Budapest | 2–3 | 2–1 | 4–2 | 2–0 | 4–2 | 1–0 | 4–1 | | 2–2 | 3–1 | 1–1 | 0–2 | 0–0 | 1–1 |
| Pécsi Dózsa | 0–1 | 3–1 | 5–2 | 0–0 | 2–0 | 1–1 | 0–0 | 1–2 | | 1–4 | 0–0 | 2–1 | 0–3 | 2–3 |
| Salgótarján | 0–0 | 0–0 | 3–0 | 2–0 | 2–1 | 2–1 | 3–1 | 2–0 | 0–0 | | 4–0 | 3–0 | 2–1 | 2–3 |
| Szegedi EAC | 1–0 | 3–0 | 1–1 | 2–1 | 2–0 | 4–3 | 1–1 | 2–4 | 2–0 | 1–1 | | 3–1 | 4–2 | 1–1 |
| Tatabányai Bányász | 2–0 | 2–0 | 1–2 | 1–1 | 2–2 | 1–0 | 1–1 | 2–1 | 2–2 | 2–0 | 0–0 | | 1–0 | 4–2 |
| Újpesti Dózsa | 3–0 | 3–0 | 5–0 | 3–2 | 0–2 | 3–2 | 2–1 | 3–3 | 3–1 | 1–0 | 5–2 | 1–1 | | 0–0 |
| Vasas | 6–0 | 5–0 | 4–0 | 2–0 | 0–1 | 2–2 | 0–0 | 4–2 | 1–0 | 6–0 | 2–0 | 4–0 | 2–4 | |

Source: rsssf.com
Legend: Blue = home team win; Yellow = draw; Red = away team win.

== Statistical leaders ==
=== Top goalscorers ===
| Rank | Scorer | Club | Goals |
|---|---|---|---|
| 1 | (Hungary) Flórián Albert | Ferencvárosi TC | 21 |
| 1 | (Hungary) Lajos Tichy | Budapest Honvéd | 21 |
| 3 | (Hungary) Ferenc Machos | Vasas SC | 17 |
| 4 | (Hungary) János Molnár | MTK Budapest | 16 |
| 5 | (Hungary) Imre Hajós | Szegedi EAC | 15 |
| 5 | (Hungary) László Lahos | Tatabányai Bányász | 15 |
| 5 | (Hungary) György Vári | Győri Vasas ETO | 15 |
| 8 | (Hungary) Mihály Vasas | Salgótarjáni BTC | 14 |
| 9 | (Hungary) János Göröcs | Újpesti Dózsa | 12 |
| 9 | (Hungary) János Farkas | Vasas SC | 12 |
| 9 | (Hungary) Tivadar Monostori | Dorogi AC | 12 |
| 9 | (Hungary) Károly Palotai | Győri Vasas ETO | 12 |

== Attendances ==
| # | Club | Average |
|---|---|---|
| 1 | Ferencváros | 34,077 |
| 2 | Vasas | 22,308 |
| 3 | Újpest | 19,692 |
| 4 | Debrecen | 17,154 |
| 5 | Pécs | 16,538 |
| 6 | Szeged | 15,692 |
| 7 | MTK | 15,308 |
| 8 | Budapest Honvéd | 15,154 |
| 9 | Diósgyőr | 13,538 |
| 10 | Győr | 12,231 |
| 11 | Tatabánya | 10,769 |
| 12 | Csepel | 8,423 |
| 13 | Salgótarján | 6,885 |
| 14 | Dorog | 6,308 |
