= Dorogi FC =

Hungarian football club

- Full name: Dorogi Futball Club
- Founded: 1914; 112 years ago
- Ground: Buzánszky Jenő Stadion
- Capacity: 4,000
- Chairman: Tamás Szauter
- Manager: András Tóth
- League: NB III; Northwest
- 2025–26: NB III; Northwest, 3rd of 16
- Website: www.dorogifc.hu
Home colours	Away colours

Dorogi Futball Club is a Hungarian football club from Dorog, Komárom-Esztergom County. The team competes in Nemzeti Bajnokság III – Northwest, the third level of the Hungarian football league system.

== History ==
Dorogcwon the Középmagyar (Dunántúl) group of the 1945 Nemzeti Bajnokság II season, as Dorogi AC.

Dorog won the Central group of the 1948–49 Nemzeti Bajnokság II season and gained promotion to the first division. Following their promotion to the first tier, the club spent almost two deades in the top division.

On 5 July 2023, Balázs Bekő was appointed as the head coach of the club.

In 2025, former Hungary international, Vladimir Koman, was signed.

== Honours ==
- Nemzeti Bajnokság II
  - Winners (2): 1945, 1948–49
- Nemzeti Bajnokság III:
  - Winners (4): 1943–44, 1970–71, 1996–97, 2012–13
- Magyar Kupa
  - Runner-up (1): 1951–52

== Stadium ==
Dorog play their home matches at the Buzánszky Jenő Stadion in Dorog.

== Current squad ==
As of 14 January 2026. Note: Flags indicate national team as defined under FIFA eligibility rules; some limited exceptions apply. Players may hold more than one non-FIFA nationality.

No.	Pos.	Nation	Player
1	GK	HUN	Bálint Tímár
2	MF	HUN	Dávid Barczi
4	DF	HUN	Tamás Szamosi
5	DF	HUN	Gergő Forgó
6	MF	HUN	Dániel Nagy-Kolozsvári
7	MF	HUN	Olivér Horváth
8	MF	HUN	András Erdei
10	MF	HUN	Vladimir Koman
11	FW	HUN	Balázs Erdey
17	DF	HUN	Dániel Pusztai
18	DF	HUN	Martin Dulló
20	MF	HUN	Ádám Klausz

No.	Pos.	Nation	Player
21	DF	HUN	Bence Hoszpodár
22	DF	HUN	Ervin Székely
23	FW	HUN	Gábor Farkas
27	FW	HUN	Patrik Tischler
28	MF	HUN	Mátyás Balla
29	MF	HUN	Zoltán Alarishi
33	GK	HUN	Gábor Tóth
66	MF	HUN	Zsombor Erdey
70	FW	HUN	Boldizsár Gula
76	MF	HUN	Marcell Nagy
71	DF	HUN	Dániel Vadnai
88	FW	HUN	Péter Benkő

== Seasons ==
The table below shows Dorogi FC's seasons.

As of 23 October 2026.

Season	Tier	Club's name	Position	Pts
1919–20	2	Dorogi AC	6 / 9	
1920–21	2	Dorogi AC	4 / 5	
1921–22	2	Dorogi AC	0 / 10	
1922–23	3	Dorogi AC	1 / 10	
1923–24	2	Dorogi AC	7 / 9	12
1924–25	2	Dorogi AC	7 / 10	15
1925–26	2	Dorogi AC	3 / 8	13
1926–27	2	Dorogi AC	1 / 7	22
1927–28	2	Dorogi AC	1 / 11	31
1928–29	2	Dorogi AC	1 / 12	36
1929–30	2	Dorogi AC	4 / 10	16
1930–31	2	Dorogi AC	4 / 10	24
1931–32	2	Dorogi AC	1 / 11	34
1932–33	2	Dorogi AC	4 / 14	33
1933–34	2	Dorogi AC	3 / 12	25
1934–35	2	Dorogi AC	3 / 12	32
1935–36	2	Dorogi AC	3 / 12	28
1936–37	2	Dorogi AC	5 / 12	28
1937–38	2	Dorogi AC	5 / 12	26
1938–39	3	Dorogi AC	1 / 12	37
1939–40	2	Dorogi AC	9 / 14	24
1940–41	3	Dorogi AC	4 / 12	25
1941–42	3	Dorogi AC	7 / 12	25
1942–43	3	Dorogi AC	4 / 14	37
1943–44	3	Dorogi AC	1 / 16	53
1944–45	2	Dorogi AC	5 / 16	12
1944–45	2	Dorogi AC	0 / 11	
1945	2	Dorogi AC	1 / 4	
1945–46	1	Dorogi AC	9 / 14	25
1945–46	1	Dorogi AC	12 / 10	21
1946–47	1	Dorogi AC	13 / 16	27
1947–48	2	Dorogi AC	2 / 14	35
1948–49	2	Dorogi AC	1 / 16	47
1949–50	1	Dorogi Tárna	9 / 16	28
1950	1	Dorogi Tárna	5 / 16	18
1951	1	Dorogi Bányász	8 / 14	26
1952	1	Dorogi Bányász	8 / 14	21
1953	1	Dorogi Bányász SK	10 / 14	21
1954	1	Dorogi Bányász SK	6 / 14	25
1955	1	Dorogi Bányász SK	5 / 14	29
1956	1	Dorogi Bányász	9 / 12	16
1957	1	Dorogi Bányász	9 / 12	10
1957–58	1	Dorogi Bányász	11 / 14	22
1958–59	1	Dorogi Bányász	11 / 14	21
1959–60	1	Dorogi Bányász	10 / 14	23
1960–61	1	Dorogi Bányász SC	12 / 14	19
1961–62	1	Dorogi Bányász	6 / 14	27
1962–63	1	Dorogi Bányász	4 / 14	30
1963	1	Dorogi Bányász SC	10 / 14	13
1964	1	Dorogi Bányász SC	8 / 14	23
1965	1	Dorogi Bányász	12 / 14	21
1966	1	Dorogi Bányász	14 / 14	11
1967	2	Dorogi Bányász SC	16 / 18	30
1968	3	Dorogi Bányász SC	3 / 16	39
1969	3	Dorogi Bányász	3 / 16	36
1970	3	Dorogi Bányász SC	8 / 16	14
1970–71	3	Dorogi Bányász SC	1 / 16	44
1971–72	2	Dorogi AC	12 / 18	31
1972–73	2	Dorogi AC	2 / 18	44
1973–74	1	Dorogi AC	16 / 16	10
1974–75	2	Dorogi AC	9 / 20	39
1975–76	2	Dorogi AC	2 / 20	54
1976–77	1	Dorogi AC	18 / 18	16
1977–78	2	Dorogi AC	12 / 20	36
1978–79	2	Dorogi AC	9 / 20	39
1979–80	2	Dorogi AC	17 / 20	31
1980–81	2	Dorogi AC	11 / 20	36
1981–82	2	Dorogi AC	3 / 16	38
1982–83	2	Dorogi AC	18 / 20	34
1983–84	3	Dorogi AC	4 / 18	41
1984–85	3	Dorogi AC	9 / 18	37
1985–86	3	Dorogi Bányász SC	3 / 18	46
1986–87	3	Dorogi Bányász SC	3 / 18	45
1987–88	3	Dorogi Bányász SC	2 / 18	51
1988–89	2	Dorogi Bányász	10 / 16	41
1989–90	2	Dorogi Bányász SC	9 / 16	41
1990–91	2	Dorogi Bányász SC	7 / 16	28
1991–92	2	Dorogi Bányász SC	3 / 16	36
1992–93	2	Dorogi Bányász SC	4 / 16	35
1993–94	2	Dorogi Bányász SC	14 / 16	25
1994–95	3	Dorogi Bányász SC	13 / 16	34
1995–96	3	Dorogi SE	4 / 16	55
1996–97	3	Dorogi SE	1 / 16	70
1997–98	2	Budalakk Konzorcium FC Dorog	19 / 20	34
1998–99	3	Dorogi FC	3 / 16	50
1999–00	3	Dorogi FC	5 / 16	43
2000	2	Dorogi FC	6 / 7	16
2000–01	2	Dorogi FC	12 / 12	16
2001–02	2	Dorogi FC	11 / 12	14
2001–02	2	Dorogi FC	12 / 12	4
2002–03	3	Dorogi FC	6 / 12	34
2002–03	3	Dorogi FC	4 / 12	51
2003–04	4	Dorogi FC	7 / 16	44
2004–05	4	Dorogi FC	8 / 15	45
2005–06	3	Dorogi FC	15 / 18	28
2006–07	3	Dorogi FC	6 / 14	37
2007–08	3	Dorogi FC	14 / 16	25
2008–09	3	Dorogi FC	11 / 16	34
2009–10	3	Dorogi FC	10 / 14	28
2010–11	3	Dorogi FC	15 / 16	24
2011–12	3	Dorogi FC	2 / 16	68
2012–13	3	Dorogi FC	1 / 14	58
2013–14	3	Dorogi FC	11 / 16	37
2014–15	3	Dorogi FC	8 / 16	35
2015–16	3	Dorogi FC	3 / 17	68
2016–17	2	Dorogi FC	8 / 20	54
2017–18	2	Dorogi FC	12 / 20	46
2018–19	2	Dorogi FC	14 / 20	43
2019–20	2	Dorogi FC	13 / 20	33
2020–21	2	Dorogi FC	14 / 20	44
2021–22	2	Dorogi FC	17 / 20	41
2022–23	2	Dorogi FC	20 / 20	31
2023–24	3	Dorogi FC	7 / 16	41
2024–25	3	Dorogi FC	12 / 16	29
2025–26	3	Dorogi FC	3 / 16	58
