= Károly Sándor =

Hungarian footballer (1928–2014)

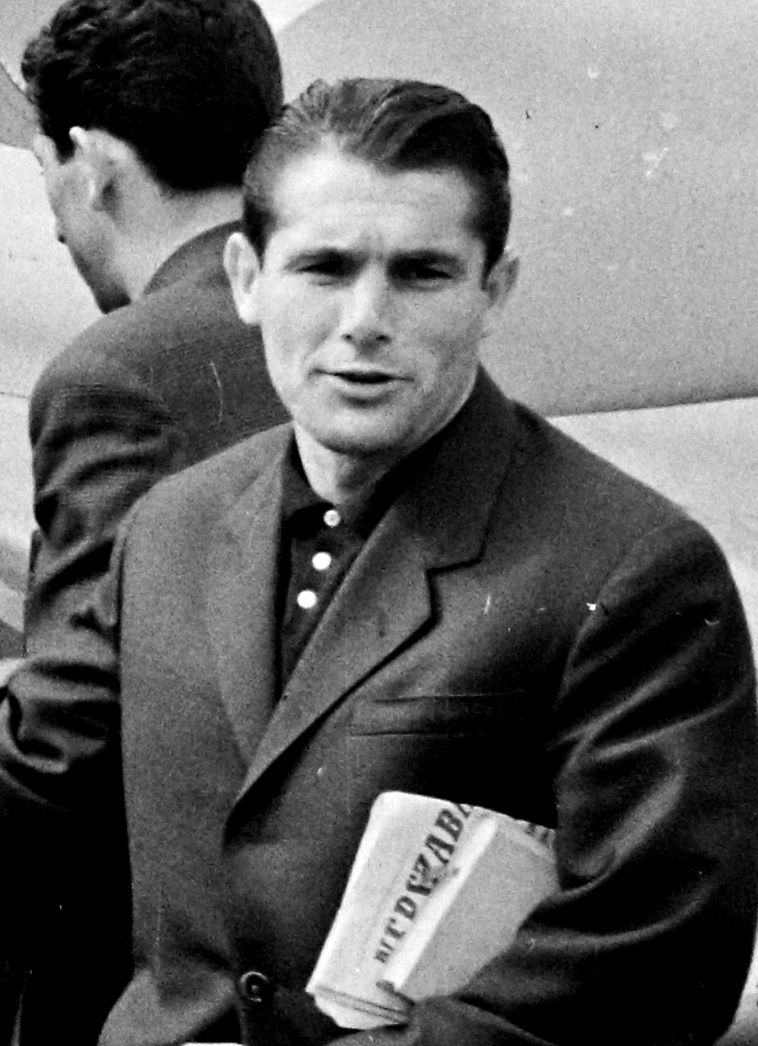
- Sándor in 1961

Personal information
- Date of birth: 26 November 1928
- Place of birth: Szeged, Kingdom of Hungary
- Date of death: 10 September 2014 (aged 85)
- Position: Right winger

Senior career*
Years	Team	Apps	(Gls)
1947–1964	MTK	379	(182)

International career
1949–1964	Hungary	75	(27)
- * Club domestic league appearances and goals

Károly Sándor (26 November 1928 – 10 September 2014) was a Hungarian international footballer who earned 75 caps between 1949 and 1964, scoring 27 goals. Sándor also participated in the World Cups in 1958 and 1962. Sándor, who played as a right winger, played club football for MTK.
