= Gyula Szilágyi (footballer) =

Hungarian footballer

Personal information
- Full name: Gyula Szilágyi
- Date of birth: 18 January 1923
- Place of birth: Debrecen, Hungary
- Date of death: 17 October 2001 (aged 78)
- Place of death: Budapest, Hungary
- Position: Forward

Senior career*
| Years | Team | Apps | (Gls) |
| 1939–1945 | Debrecen | 29 | (18) |
| 1945–1960 | Vasas | 361 | (295) |
| Total | | 390 | (313) |

International career
| 1947–1950 | Hungary | 12 | (9) |
- * Club domestic league appearances and goals

Gyula Szilágyi (18 January 1923 – 17 October 2001) was a Hungarian footballer who played as a forward. He was the top scorer of the Hungarian league in 1957.

== Honours ==
Vasas SC

- Nemzeti Bajnokság I: 1957
- Hungarian Cup: 1955
- Mitropa Cup: 1956, 1957, 1960
