= 1970 Nemzeti Bajnokság I =

Nemzeti Bajnokság I
- Season: 1970

Final standings of the Hungarian League 1970 Spring season

== Group stage ==
=== Group A ===
Pos	Team	Pld	W	D	L	GF	GA	GR	Pts	Qualification
1	Újpesti Dózsa	14	11	1	2	37	13	2.846	23	Qualification for championship final
2	MTK Budapest	14	8	2	4	19	12	1.583	18	
3	Vasas	14	7	4	3	19	13	1.462	18	
4	Diósgyőr	14	7	4	3	16	13	1.231	18	
5	Tatabányai Bányász	14	4	4	6	15	17	0.882	12	
6	Videoton	14	3	2	9	16	28	0.571	8	
7	Komlói Bányász	14	3	2	9	14	26	0.538	8	
8	Rába ETO Győr	14	3	1	10	9	23	0.391	7	

Source: rsssf.com

==== Results ====
Home \ Away	DIÓ	KOM	MTK	GYŐ	TAT	ÚJP	VAS	VID
Diósgyőr		1–0	1–0	1–0	1–1	1–1	0–0	2–0
Komlói Bányász	2–1		1–3	2–2	2–0	0–3	0–1	3–0
MTK Budapest	3–1	2–1		2–0	0–0	2–0	0–1	0–3
Rába ETO Győr	0–1	2–1	0–2		0–1	2–0	0–3	2–1
Tatabányai Bányász	2–5	3–1	0–0	2–1		0–1	1–1	2–0
Újpesti Dózsa	3–0	5–0	3–2	3–0	2–1		3–1	5–1
Vasas	1–1	2–0	1–2	1–0	1–0	1–3		3–1
Videoton	2–1	1–1	0–1	3–0	0–1	2–5	2–2	

Source: rsssf.com
Legend: Blue = home team win; Yellow = draw; Red = away team win.

=== Group B ===
Pos	Team	Pld	W	D	L	GF	GA	GR	Pts	Qualification
1	Ferencváros	14	8	4	2	17	8	2.125	20	Qualification for championship final
2	Budapest Honvéd	14	8	2	4	26	9	2.889	18	
3	Csepel	14	6	5	3	18	6	3.000	17	
4	Pécsi Dózsa	14	6	4	4	18	11	1.636	16	
5	Dunaújvárosi Kohász	14	4	4	6	15	22	0.682	12	
6	Haladás	14	3	5	6	13	22	0.591	11	
7	Salgótarján	14	3	4	7	14	25	0.560	10	
8	SZEOL	14	3	2	9	15	33	0.455	8	

Source: rsssf.com

==== Results ====
Home \ Away	CSE	DUN	FTC	HAL	HON	PÉC	SAL	SZE
Csepel		5–0	0–0	0–0	0–0	0–0	4–1	3–0
Dunaújvárosi Kohász	1–1		1–1	1–1	2–1	0–2	4–1	1–0
Ferencváros	1–0	2–0		2–1	1–0	1–0	2–0	4–0
Haladás	1–0	2–1	1–1		0–2	3–1	2–2	1–1
Budapest Honvéd	0–2	1–0	3–0	3–0		1–1	4–1	7–0
Pécsi Dózsa	0–1	4–0	0–0	2–0	0–1		2–0	1–0
Salgótarján	0–1	0–0	1–2	2–1	1–0	1–1		2–0
SZEOL	2–1	1–4	1–0	4–0	1–3	3–4	2–2	

Source: rsssf.com
Legend: Blue = home team win; Yellow = draw; Red = away team win.

== Play-off matches ==
The teams that finished on the same place played against each other and the results determined their final position.

=== Final ===
Position	Team #1	Agg.	Team #2	1st leg	2nd leg
1st place	Újpesti Dózsa	4–3	Ferencváros	3–2	1–1

Teams	Újpesti Dózsa - Ferencváros
Score	3 - 2
Date	6 June 1970
Stadium	Megyeri út, Újpest, Budapest; 25 000 spectators
Referee	Almási
Goals	0:1 (16.) Szőke, 1:1 (20.) Dunai II, 1:2 (68.) Füsi, 2:2 (86.) Göröcs, 3:2 (89.) Dunai II
Újpesti Dózsa	Szentmihályi; Noskó, Solymosi, Dunai III, P. Juhász; Zámbó (Káposzta, 72.), Göröcs; Fazekas, Dunai II, Bene, L. Nagy (A. Tóth, 72.); Trainer: Lajos Baróti
Ferencváros	Géczi; Páncsics; Bálint, Havasi, Vépi, Megyesi; I. Juhász, Mucha; Szőke, Albert, Füsi (Branikovits, 72.); Trainer: Géza Kalocsay

Teams	Ferencváros - Újpesti Dózsa
Score	1 - 1
Date	27 June 1970
Stadium	Népstadion, Budapest; 60 000 spectators
Referee	Zsolt
Goals	1:0 (58.) Branikovits, 1:1 (72.) Vépi (own goal)
Ferencváros	Géczi; Novák, Bálint, Páncsics, Vépi, Megyesi; I. Juhász (Kü, 46.), Mucha; Szőke, Branikovits, Füsi; Trainer: Géza Kalocsay
Újpesti Dózsa	Borbély; Káposzta, Solymosi, Dunai III, P. Juhász; Göröcs, Noskó; Fazekas, Bene, Dunai II, Zámbó; Trainer: Lajos Baróti

=== Other results ===
Position	Team #1	Agg.	Team #2	1st leg	2nd leg
3rd place	MTK Budapest	2–6	Budapest Honvéd	1–3	1–3
5th place	Vasas	5–2	Csepel	4–0	1–2
7th place	Diósgyőr	4–9	Pécsi Dózsa	1–4	3–5
9th place	Tatabányai Bányász	2–1	Dunaújvárosi Kohász	0–0	2–1
11th place	Videoton	8–4	Haladás	7–1	1–3
13th place	Komlói Bányász	4–3	Salgótarján	3–1	1–2
15th place	Rába ETO Győr	3–3 (a)	SZEOL	2–0	1–3

== Final standings ==
The final standings of the 1970 Spring Championship, after the play-off matches:

Pos	Team
1	Újpesti Dózsa (C)
2	Ferencváros
3	Budapest Honvéd
4	MTK Budapest
5	Vasas
6	Csepel
7	Pécsi Dózsa
8	Diósgyőr
9	Tatabányai Bányász
10	Dunaújvárosi Kohász
11	Videoton
12	Haladás
13	Komlói Bányász
14	Salgótarján
15	SZEOL
16	Rába ETO Győr

Source: rsssf.com
(C) Champions

No teams were relegated

The winner of each group received 8 points, whilst the remaining teams got 7-1 points according to their standing. These points were added to the final table of 1970-1971 championship.

== Statistical leaders ==
=== Top goalscorers ===
Rank	Scorer	Club	Goals
1	(Hungary) Antal Dunai	Újpesti Dózsa	14
2	(Hungary) Ferenc Bene	Újpesti Dózsa	10
3	(Hungary) János Farkas	Vasas SC	9
4	(Hungary) Horváth András	Diósgyőri VTK	8
4	(Hungary) János Máté	Pécsi Dózsa	8
4	(Hungary) Lajos Puskás	Vasas SC	8
4	(Hungary) István Rottenbiller	Csepel SC	8

== Attendances ==
No.	Club	Average	Highest
1	Újpesti Dózsa	27,500	60,000
2	Ferencváros	14,375	50,000
3	Budapest Honvéd	13,000	25,000
4	MTK Budapest	11,500	25,000
5	Vasas	9,125	10,000
6	Csepel	8,625	12,000
7	Pécsi Dózsa	7,875	16,000
8	Diósgyőr	6,875	15,000
9	Tatabányai Bányász	6,250	8,000
10	Dunaújvárosi Kohász	6,250	12,000
11	Videoton	5,313	12,000
12	Haladás	4,938	8,000
13	Komlói Bányász	4,625	6,000
14	Salgótarján	4,438	15,000
15	SZEOL	4,375	6,000
16	Rába ETO Győr	3,625	7,000
