= 1968 Inter-Cities Fairs Cup final =

- Event: 1967–68 Inter-Cities Fairs Cup
Leeds United	Ferencváros
(England)	(Hungary)
1	0
- on aggregate

First leg
Leeds United	Ferencváros
1	0
- Date: 7 August 1968
- Venue: Elland Road, Leeds
- Referee: Rudolf Scheurer (Switzerland)
- Attendance: 25,268

Second leg
Ferencváros	Leeds United
0	0
- Date: 11 September 1968
- Venue: Népstadion, Budapest
- Referee: Gerhard Schulenburg (West Germany)
- Attendance: 76,000

The 1968 Inter-Cities Fairs Cup final was the final of the tenth season of the Inter-Cities Fairs Cup. It was played on 7 August and 11 September 1968 between Leeds United A.F.C. of England and Ferencváros of Hungary. Leeds United won the tie 1–0 on aggregate, having won the first leg 1–0 at home prior to a 0–0 draw in the second leg. It was both clubs' second appearance in the final, with Leeds United having been defeated finalists to Dinamo Zagreb in the previous season's final, whilst Ferencváros won the tournament in 1965 having beat Juventus in the final.

== Route to the final ==
The Inter-Cities Fairs Cup was created in 1955 as a tournament between cities that hosted international trade fairs. It originally had an irregular format with the competition taking place over multiple seasons, before the format was changed such that it took place over a single season. The 1967–68 Inter-Cities Fairs Cup was the 10th season of the competition.

Both teams took part in five rounds prior to reaching the final. The first leg saw Leeds beat Luxembourgish side Spora Luxembourg 16–0 over two legs before victories over FK Partizan, Hibernian and Rangers saw Leeds set up a semi-final against Scottish side Dundee. The first leg saw Leeds draw 1–1, before an Eddie Gray goal late in the second leg saw Leeds seal their place in the final. Despite losing 3–1 to Romanian side Argeș Pitești in the first leg of their first round tie, Ferencváros won the second leg 4–0 to advance to the next round. The second round saw Ferencváros come from behind to beat Zaragoza, before victories over Liverpool, Athletic Bilbao and Bologna saw the Hungarian side reach the final.

Leeds United				Round	Ferencváros			
Opponent	Agg.	1st leg	2nd leg		Opponent	Agg.	1st leg	2nd leg
Spora Luxembourg	16–0	9–0 (A)	7–0 (H)	First round	(Romania) Argeș Pitești	5–3	1–3 (A)	4–0 (H)
(Socialist Federal Republic of Yugoslavia) Partizan	3–2	2–1 (A)	1–1 (H)	Second round	(Spain) Zaragoza	4–2	1–2 (A)	3–0 (H)
(Scotland) Hibernian	2–1	1–0 (H)	1–1 (A)	Third round	(England) Liverpool	2–0	1–0 (H)	1–0 (A)
(Scotland) Rangers	2–0	0–0 (A)	2–0 (H)	Quarter-finals	(Spain) Athletic Club	4–2	2–1 (H)	2–1 (A)
(Scotland) Dundee	2–1	1–1 (A)	1–0 (H)	Semi-finals	(Italy) Bologna	5–4	3–2 (H)	2–2 (A)

== Match ==
=== First leg ===
The attendance for the first leg, hosted at Leeds United's Elland Road, was just 25,268, with the match being televised live on BBC One cited as the reason for the surprisingly low figure. The referee for the first leg was Swiss referee Rudolf Scheurer. Both sides had early chances, with Ferencváros midfielder István Szőke failing to capitalise on a mistake made at the back by Leeds' Jack Charlton, before Leeds' Peter Lorimer had a shot well saved after goalkeeper István Géczi's free kick fell straight to Mick Jones. Leeds scored the first and only goal of the game in the 41st minute as Lorimer's corner fell first to Jack Charlton before Mick Jones bundled the ball over the line, despite complaints from the Hungarian side that Charlton fouled goalkeeper István Géczi in the build-up. The second half saw both teams have chances to score, though the away side had the best chances, with István Szőke putting a good chance wide before Gyula Rákosi failed to beat Leeds goalkeeper Gary Sprake.

7 August 1968

Leeds United (England)	1–0	(Hungary) Ferencváros
Jones 41'	Report

Elland Road, Leeds
Attendance: 25,368
Referee: Rudolf Scheurer (Switzerland)

Leeds United

Ferencváros

Leeds United
GK	1	(Wales) Gary Sprake
DF	2	(England) Paul Reaney
DF	3	(England) Terry Cooper
MF	4	(Scotland) Billy Bremner (c)
DF	5	(England) Jack Charlton
DF	6	(England) Norman Hunter
FW	7	(Scotland) Peter Lorimer
MF	8	(England) Paul Madeley
FW	9	(England) Mick Jones	(substituted off) 70'
MF	10	(Republic of Ireland) Johnny Giles	(substituted off) 65'
FW	11	(Scotland) Eddie Gray
Substitutes:
FW		(England) Rod Belfitt	(substituted on) 70'
FW		(England) Jimmy Greenhoff	(substituted on) 65'
Manager:
(England) Don Revie

Ferencváros
GK	1	(Hungary) István Géczi
DF	2	(Hungary) Dezső Novák (c)
DF	3	(Hungary) Miklós Páncsics
DF	6	(Hungary) Sándor Havasi
MF	4	(Hungary) István Juhász
FW	5	(Hungary) Lajos Szűcs
MF	8	(Hungary) István Szőke
MF	7	(Hungary) Zoltán Varga
FW	9	(Hungary) Flórián Albert
MF	10	(Hungary) Gyula Rákosi
FW	11	(Hungary) Máté Fenyvesi	(substituted off) 65'
Substitutes:
MF	13	(Hungary) László Bálint	(substituted on) 65'
Manager:
(Hungary) Károly Lakat

=== Second leg ===
The second leg, hosted in front of a crowd of 76,000 at Ferencváros' Népstadion, was under threat of not taking place due to growing tensions between the east and west as a result of the Warsaw Pact invasion of Czechoslovakia. The second leg saw Leeds play much more defensively than in the first, with Leeds described as having a 'ten-man defence'. Ferencváros dominated, with strong first-half chances falling to Gyula Rákosi and István Szőke, and their dominance continued throughout the match but they failed to score. Following the match, Leeds manager Don Revie stated, "As the final whistle drew nearer every minute seemed like an hour." Victory over Ferencváros marked Leeds' first major European honour.

11 September 1968

Ferencváros (Hungary)	0–0	(England) Leeds United
	Report

Népstadion, Budapest
Attendance: 70,000
Referee: Gerhard Schulenburg (West Germany)

Ferencváros

Leeds United

GK	1	(Hungary) István Géczi
DF	2	(Hungary) Dezső Novák (c)
DF	3	(Hungary) Miklós Páncsics
DF	6	(Hungary) Sándor Havasi
MF	4	(Hungary) István Juhász
FW	5	(Hungary) Lajos Szűcs
MF	8	(Hungary) István Szőke	(substituted off) 60'
MF	7	(Hungary) Zoltán Varga
FW	9	(Hungary) Flórián Albert
MF	10	(Hungary) Gyula Rákosi
FW	18	(Hungary) Sándor Katona
Substitutes:
	17	(Hungary) János Karába	(substituted on) 60'
Manager:
(Hungary) Károly Lakat

GK	1	(Wales) Gary Sprake
DF	2	(England) Paul Reaney
DF	3	(England) Terry Cooper
MF	4	(Scotland) Billy Bremner (c)
DF	5	(England) Jack Charlton
DF	6	(England) Norman Hunter
MF	7	(England) Michael O'Grady
MF	8	(England) Paul Madeley
FW	9	(Scotland) Peter Lorimer
FW	10	(England) Mick Jones
FW	11	(England) Terry Hibbitt	(substituted off) 62'
Substitutes:
MF		(England) Mick Bates	(substituted on) 62'
Manager:
(England) Don Revie

Leeds United win 1–0 on aggregate

== See also ==
- 1967–68 Inter-Cities Fairs Cup
- Ferencvárosi TC in European football
- Leeds United F.C. in European football
