= 1967 Nemzeti Bajnokság I =

Nemzeti Bajnokság I
- Season: 1967

Statistics of Nemzeti Bajnokság I in the 1967 season.

== Overview ==
It was contested by 16 teams, and Ferencvárosi TC won the championship.

== League standings ==
Pos	Team	Pld	W	D	L	GF	GA	GR	Pts
1	Ferencvárosi TC	30	24	4	2	85	24	3.542	52
2	Újpesti Dózsa	30	18	8	4	89	36	2.472	44
3	Győri ETO FC	30	14	11	5	68	37	1.838	39
4	Vasas SC	30	16	6	8	71	37	1.919	38
5	FC Tatabánya	30	9	11	10	39	36	1.083	29
6	Budapest Honvéd FC	30	9	10	11	46	49	0.939	28
7	Diósgyőri VTK	30	10	8	12	48	54	0.889	28
8	Csepel SC	30	7	14	9	38	47	0.809	28
9	Szegedi EAC	30	9	8	13	34	65	0.523	26
10	MTK Budapest FC	30	7	11	12	38	45	0.844	25
11	Pécsi Dózsa	30	8	9	13	31	40	0.775	25
12	Szombathelyi Haladás	30	10	5	15	42	60	0.700	25
13	Salgótarjáni BTC	30	9	7	14	39	58	0.672	25
14	Dunaújváros FC	30	9	7	14	35	56	0.625	25
15	Komlói Bányász SK	30	8	8	14	36	63	0.571	24
16	Egri Dózsa	30	6	7	17	35	67	0.522	19

Source: rsssf.com

== Results ==
Home \ Away	CSE	DIÓ	DUN	EGR	FTC	HAL	HON	KOM	MTK	PÉC	GYŐ	SAL	SZE	TAT	VAS	ÚJP
Csepel		1–1	1–1	0–0	3–2	3–2	2–2	2–1	2–1	0–0	1–3	2–2	4–1	1–0	0–0	0–3
Diósgyőr	2–2		1–0	1–0	1–2	3–2	0–0	4–0	2–2	2–0	1–1	1–1	4–0	1–1	2–4	2–2
Dunaújvárosi Kohász	3–3	3–1		3–0	1–1	0–1	2–1	1–0	3–1	1–0	2–2	4–0	1–2	2–0	1–0	1–4
Egri Dózsa	2–0	2–1	4–2		2–4	1–2	4–3	1–1	0–2	1–1	2–1	2–2	1–0	1–4	0–1	1–1
Ferencváros	2–0	3–1	5–0	1–0		2–0	2–0	4–2	5–0	2–1	2–0	4–0	5–0	2–1	2–2	3–3
Haladás	1–0	1–2	2–0	3–2	2–1		1–3	4–0	1–0	1–3	2–2	2–4	3–1	3–1	1–2	1–3
Budapest Honvéd	1–1	1–4	4–0	3–2	1–7	5–0		1–1	2–2	1–0	2–2	1–0	4–1	3–1	2–1	2–2
Komlói Bányász	2–1	2–3	4–1	1–1	0–4	3–0	2–0		1–0	1–1	3–2	2–1	0–2	1–1	1–0	3–3
MTK Budapest	2–2	2–0	0–0	4–0	0–2	4–0	2–1	0–0		1–0	2–2	0–0	1–1	3–0	1–1	3–4
Pécsi Dózsa	0–1	3–0	1–0	3–1	0–2	2–2	0–0	2–1	1–1		1–1	2–1	0–0	2–1	3–1	1–1
Rába ETO Győr	2–2	3–0	2–1	4–0	1–2	2–2	2–1	9–0	2–1	2–1		4–0	5–0	2–1	2–1	1–0
Salgótarján	1–0	4–3	4–2	1–0	0–3	1–1	1–0	2–0	0–0	4–1	1–1		3–0	1–1	2–4	0–2
Szegedi EAC	2–0	2–2	0–0	2–1	1–5	0–0	1–1	3–2	2–0	2–1	1–1	6–3		1–0	1–4	2–2
Tatabányai Bányász	4–0	3–0	0–0	1–1	1–1	1–0	0–0	0–0	2–1	4–1	2–2	2–1	4–0		1–1	1–0
Vasas	2–2	6–2	8–0	7–1	1–2	3–1	1–0	5–2	3–0	1–0	0–4	6–0	3–0	1–1		1–0
Újpesti Dózsa	2–2	2–1	4–0	8–2	0–3	6–1	5–1	5–0	6–2	4–0	3–1	2–0	5–0	4–0	3–1	

Source: rsssf.com
Legend: Blue = home team win; Yellow = draw; Red = away team win.

== Statistical leaders ==
=== Top goalscorers ===
Rank	Scorer	Club	Goals
1	(Hungary) Antal Dunai	Újpesti Dózsa	36
2	(Hungary) Flórián Albert	Ferencvárosi TC	28
3	(Hungary) Ferenc Bene	Újpesti Dózsa	22
4	(Hungary) Lajos Puskás	Vasas SC	20
5	(Hungary) János Farkas	Vasas SC	19
6	(Hungary) Tibor Varsányi	Győri Vasas ETO	16
7	(Hungary) László Kalmár	Csepel SC	15
7	(Hungary) István Szőke	Ferencvárosi TC	15
7	(Hungary) László Takács	MTK Budapest	15
7	(Hungary) Zoltán Varga	Ferencvárosi TC	15

== Attendances ==
#	Club	Average
1	Ferencváros	26,200
2	Vasas	20,200
3	Újpest	18,133
4	MTK	15,357
5	Diósgyör	14,867
6	Haladás	10,933
7	Budapest Honvéd	10,133
8	Egri Dózsa	8,700
9	Szeged	8,533
10	Pécsi Dósza	7,633
11	Csepel	7,333
12	Dunaújváros	7,333
13	Tatabánya	7,333
14	Győr	7,167
15	Salgótarján	7,133
16	Komlói Bányász	5,167
