= 1972–73 Nemzeti Bajnokság I =

Nemzeti Bajnokság I
- Season: 1972–73

Final standings of the 1972–73 Hungarian League season.

== Final standings ==
Pos	Team	Pld	W	D	L	GF	GA	GD	Pts	Qualification or relegation
1	Újpesti Dózsa (C)	30	21	4	5	81	21	+60	46	Qualification for European Cup first round
2	Ferencváros	30	17	7	6	60	31	+29	41	Qualification for UEFA Cup first round
3	Vasas	30	16	8	6	54	33	+21	40	Qualification for Cup Winners' Cup first round
4	Budapest Honvéd	30	12	11	7	60	37	+23	35	Qualification for UEFA Cup first round
5	Videoton	30	15	5	10	46	39	+7	35	
6	Zalaegerszeg	30	13	7	10	42	37	+5	33	
7	Csepel	30	9	13	8	45	38	+7	31	
8	Rába ETO Győr	30	14	2	14	46	51	−5	30	
9	MTK Budapest	30	8	11	11	36	49	−13	27	
10	Salgótarján	30	9	7	14	40	50	−10	25	
11	Tatabányai Bányász	30	8	9	13	28	39	−11	25	
12	Pécsi Dózsa	30	7	11	12	27	41	−14	25	
13	Egyetértés VM	30	7	10	13	28	48	−20	24	
14	SZEOL	30	7	10	13	31	52	−21	24	
15	Diósgyőr (R)	30	5	10	15	20	50	−30	20	Relegation to Nemzeti Bajnokság II
16	Komlói Bányász (R)	30	5	9	16	24	52	−28	19	Relegation to Nemzeti Bajnokság II

(C) Champions; (R) Relegated

== Results ==
Home \ Away	CSE	DIÓ	EGY	FTC	HON	MTK	KOM	PÉC	GYŐ	SAL	SZE	TAT	ÚJP	VAS	VID	ZTE
Csepel		2–0	2–1	0–1	1–1	5–1	2–0	3–1	3–1	0–0	3–3	1–0	0–0	3–1	2–2	2–2
Diósgyőr	1–0		2–1	1–4	0–0	0–0	1–0	0–0	1–3	1–1	1–1	2–0	0–4	0–1	0–2	1–0
Egyetértés VM	1–1	2–1		2–4	1–1	0–1	0–0	0–1	1–0	2–1	2–0	1–1	2–1	1–1	1–0	0–1
Ferencváros	3–2	4–0	3–1		4–4	0–0	1–0	4–1	4–1	6–0	1–1	3–1	2–1	0–0	3–0	2–0
Budapest Honvéd	2–1	3–1	0–0	2–0		0–0	7–0	1–0	6–1	4–2	1–1	2–0	0–1	2–2	4–1	6–0
MTK Budapest	2–2	1–1	1–1	0–1	3–2		0–0	1–0	4–3	4–1	1–2	3–1	0–2	2–2	2–3	1–1
Komlói Bányász	0–0	2–2	2–2	1–3	0–0	0–0		0–2	1–0	1–0	4–2	1–1	0–3	0–2	1–0	1–0
Pécsi Dózsa	0–0	0–0	0–1	1–2	1–1	3–0	3–1		1–0	1–1	2–0	1–0	1–4	1–1	1–1	3–3
Rába ETO Győr	3–5	1–0	3–0	1–0	1–1	1–2	2–1	3–1		2–1	4–1	2–0	1–0	2–1	2–0	2–1
Salgótarján	2–1	1–0	5–2	1–1	0–2	2–0	3–1	2–0	2–1		5–0	2–1	1–2	2–3	2–0	1–1
SZEOL	3–1	2–1	1–1	0–0	2–1	2–1	1–1	0–0	2–2	2–0		0–2	0–1	1–1	2–1	0–1
Tatabányai Bányász	0–0	0–0	2–0	2–2	1–4	2–2	3–2	0–0	1–0	2–1	2–1		1–1	2–0	0–2	1–2
Újpesti Dózsa	2–2	7–0	5–0	2–0	4–0	4–1	4–1	5–1	7–0	4–0	2–0	3–1		1–1	3–1	3–0
Vasas	1–0	4–1	3–0	2–1	2–1	2–3	2–1	5–0	0–2	3–1	3–1	0–0	3–0		3–0	3–1
Videoton	1–1	3–1	3–0	3–1	3–1	2–0	3–1	3–1	2–1	1–1	3–0	1–0	1–5	3–0		1–0
Zalaegerszeg	3–0	1–1	2–2	1–0	4–1	4–0	3–1	1–0	2–1	2–1	4–0	0–1	1–0	1–2	0–0	

Legend: Blue = home team win; Yellow = draw; Red = away team win.

== Statistical leaders ==
=== Top goalscorers ===
Rank	Scorer	Club	Goals
1	(Hungary) Ferenc Bene	Újpesti Dózsa	23
2	(Hungary) Mihály Kozma	Budapest Honvéd	19
3	(Hungary) László Fazekas	Újpesti Dózsa	17
4	(Hungary) Béla Várady	Vasas SC	15
5	(Hungary) József Mucha	Ferencvárosi TC	13
5	(Hungary) László Pusztai	Budapest Honvéd	13
5	(Hungary) Lajos Szurgent	Csepel SC	13
8	(Hungary) Ferenc Vass	Szegedi EOL	12
9	(Hungary) Antal Dunai	Újpesti Dózsa	11
9	(Hungary) István Szőke	Ferencvárosi TC	11

== Attendances ==
Average home league attendance top 3:

#	Club	Average
1	Ferencváros	15,800
2	Zalaegerszeg	15,533
3	Újpest	10,000
