= Károly Lakat =

Hungarian footballer and coach (1920–1988)

Personal information
- Full name: Dr. Károly Lakat
- Date of birth: 27 November 1920
- Place of birth: Győr, Hungary
- Date of death: 3 December 1988 (aged 68)
- Place of death: Budapest, Hungary
- Position: Midfielder

Senior career*
Years	Team	Apps	(Gls)
1938–1941	Győri AC		
1941–1943	Szegedi AK		
1943–1952	Ferencvárosi TC		

International career
1945–1950	Hungary	13	(0)

Managerial career
- 1954–19XX: Gödöllői Dózsa
- –: Vörös Meteor Egyetértés SK
- 1956–1957: Szegedi Haladás
- 1957–1959: Tatabányai Bányász
- 1957: Hungary
- 1959–1960: Hungary (Olympic)
- 1963–1972: Hungary (Olympic)
- 1965–1966: MTK
- 1967–1969: Ferencvárosi TC
- 1970–1974: Tatabányai Bányász
- 1974–1976: Budapest Honvéd
- 1977–1978: Salgótarjáni BTC
- 1979–1980: Hungary
- 1980–1982: Tatabányai Bányász
- 1982–1983: Volán SC
- 1983: Debreceni VSC
- 1985: Tatabányai Bányász
- * Club domestic league appearances and goals

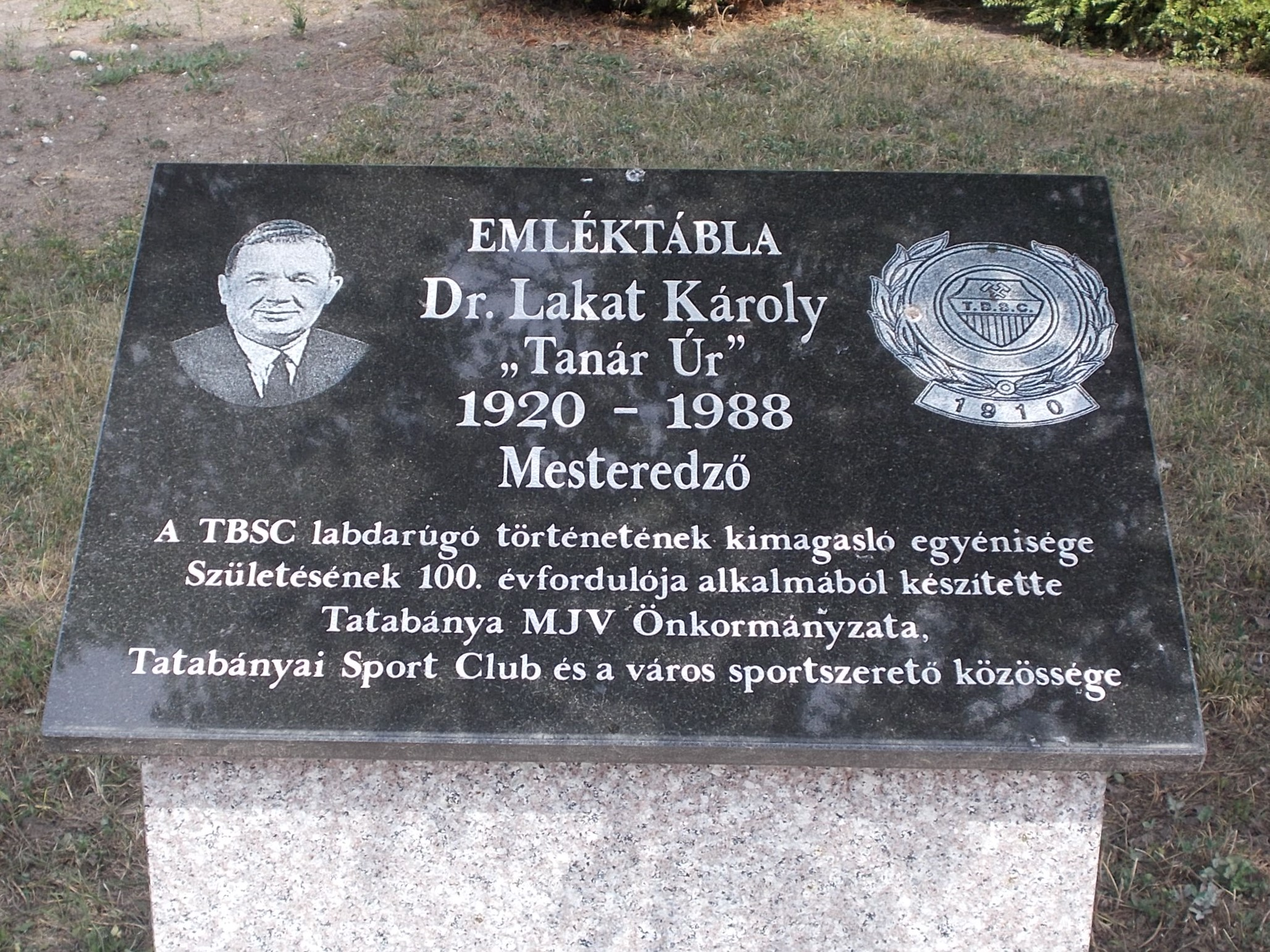
Plaque to Károly Lakat (installed in 2020, for the centennial of his birth). TBSC Tatabánya Sport Club (Est. 1910) trainer in a small Park - next to #2 Szent Borbála Street, Óváros neighborhood, Tatabánya, Komárom-Esztergom County, Hungary.

Károly Lakat (27 November 1920 – 3 December 1988) was a Hungarian footballer, who played as a midfielder. He later became a coach to numerous clubs as well as the Hungary national team.

Lakat played for Győri AC, Szegedi AK and Ferencvárosi TC and was capped 13 times for Hungary.

Lakat coached Gödöllői Dózsa, Vörös Meteor, Szegedi Haladás, Tatabányai Bányász, Hungary, Hungary (Olympic), MTK, Ferencvárosi TC, Budapest Honvéd, Salgótarjáni BTC, Volán SC and Debreceni VSC.

== Managerial honours ==
Honour	Team	Year(s)
Football at the Summer Olympics	Hungary (Olympic)	1964, 1968
Inter-Cities Fairs Cup	Ferencvárosi TC	1968 (finalist)
Hungarian league	Ferencvárosi TC	1967, 1968
