= 1969 Nemzeti Bajnokság I =

Nemzeti Bajnokság I
- Season: 1969

Final standings of the Hungarian League 1969 season

== Final standings ==
Pos	Team	Pld	W	D	L	GF	GA	GR	Pts	Qualification or relegation
1	Újpesti Dózsa	30	20	8	2	83	27	3.074	48	Champions
2	Bp. Honvéd	30	18	8	4	66	28	2.357	44	
3	FTC	30	15	9	6	56	33	1.697	39	
4	Vasas SC	30	18	3	9	72	43	1.674	39	
5	Győri ETO	30	12	10	8	53	36	1.472	34	
6	Pécsi Dózsa	30	13	6	11	41	38	1.079	32	
7	Csepel	30	11	10	9	37	36	1.028	32	
8	Tatabányai Bányász	30	10	8	12	33	41	0.805	28	
9	MTK	30	9	8	13	43	53	0.811	26	
10	Salgótarjáni BTC	30	10	5	15	29	39	0.744	25	
11	Haladás	30	7	11	12	26	44	0.591	25	
12	Komlói Bányász SK	30	5	14	11	21	37	0.568	24	
13	Diósgyőri VTK	30	7	9	14	31	51	0.608	23	
14	Dunaújváros	30	9	5	16	26	48	0.542	23	
15	Vörös Meteor Egyetértés SK	30	6	9	15	30	52	0.577	21	Relegated to NB II
16	Egri Dózsa SC	30	5	7	18	23	64	0.359	17	Relegated to NB II

Source: rsssf.com

== Results ==
Home \ Away	CSE	DIÓ	DUN	EGR	FTC	HAL	HON	KOM	MTK	PÉC	GYŐ	SAL	TAT	ÚJP	VAS	VME
Csepel		1–0	3–0	0–0	1–1	1–0	2–1	4–1	1–1	2–1	4–2	2–2	0–0	0–2	4–1	2–0
Diósgyőr	2–0		2–1	2–0	0–0	0–0	1–3	1–0	1–3	3–3	1–1	2–1	2–1	1–4	0–3	1–1
Dunaújvárosi Kohász	2–1	3–0		4–1	0–1	2–0	0–3	2–1	0–1	1–1	2–0	0–0	0–2	0–4	2–1	1–0
Egri Dózsa	2–0	3–3	2–0		0–0	1–2	0–3	0–0	2–4	0–1	0–2	1–0	0–4	1–4	2–1	1–1
Ferencváros	4–1	2–0	1–2	6–2		6–1	2–5	1–1	2–1	2–0	2–1	3–1	3–0	0–2	2–0	2–0
Haladás	1–0	1–1	2–0	3–0	0–2		1–1	1–1	2–2	1–1	1–1	2–1	2–1	1–4	2–2	1–0
Budapest Honvéd	2–2	1–0	5–0	4–0	2–3	3–0		3–0	0–0	3–0	3–2	3–1	0–0	1–1	1–3	4–1
Komlói Bányász	1–0	2–0	0–0	1–1	0–0	1–1	0–0		0–0	3–0	0–0	1–0	1–1	1–1	1–3	0–0
MTK Budapest	1–2	1–1	0–0	5–1	3–4	0–0	1–3	0–1		3–0	0–0	3–1	3–0	0–6	1–5	2–1
Pécsi Dózsa	0–0	1–0	2–0	1–1	1–0	3–1	1–2	3–0	4–1		2–1	6–1	1–0	1–0	2–3	3–0
Rába ETO Győr	4–0	4–0	4–1	2–0	2–2	3–0	0–1	2–2	2–1	1–1		2–0	2–1	1–1	3–0	1–1
Salgótarján	1–1	2–0	1–0	0–1	2–1	1–0	2–1	4–0	1–0	1–0	0–0		1–0	0–2	0–1	2–0
Tatabányai Bányász	1–1	1–1	4–2	4–1	1–1	2–0	0–2	1–0	1–0	0–1	0–2	2–1		0–0	0–7	2–2
Újpesti Dózsa	1–1	2–1	3–1	2–0	1–1	3–0	3–3	2–0	6–1	2–1	5–1	3–1	1–2		4–2	4–4
Vasas	2–0	4–2	3–0	2–0	2–2	0–0	1–2	4–1	2–3	3–0	5–1	1–0	4–1	1–6		2–1
VM Egyetértés	0–1	2–3	0–0	3–0	1–0	1–0	1–1	2–1	4–2	3–0	0–6	1–1	0–1	0–4	0–4	

Source: rsssf.com
Legend: Blue = home team win; Yellow = draw; Red = away team win.

== Statistical leaders ==
=== Top goalscorers ===
Rank	Scorer	Club	Goals
1	(Hungary) Ferenc Bene	Újpesti Dózsa	27
2	(Hungary) Lajos Puskás	Vasas SC	25
3	(Hungary) János Farkas	Vasas SC	21
3	(Hungary) Mihály Kozma	Budapest Honvéd	21
5	(Hungary) Antal Dunai	Újpesti Dózsa	16
6	(Hungary) János Máté	Pécsi Dózsa	14
7	(Hungary) István Korsós	Rába ETO	13
8	(Hungary) László Pusztai	Budapest Honvéd	12
8	(Hungary) László Takács	MTK Budapest	12
10	(Hungary) Flórián Albert	Ferencvárosi TC	11
10	(Hungary) József Somogyi	Rába ETO	11

== Attendances ==
#	Club	Average
1	Ferencváros	14,940
2	Újpest	13,533
3	Diósgyör	10,687
4	Budapest Honvéd	10,467
5	Haladás	10,067
6	Vasas	10,000
7	Egri Dózsa	8,200
8	MTK	7,333
9	Győr	6,920
10	Pécs	6,533
11	Csepel	6,467
12	Komlói Bányász	6,240
13	Tatabánya Bányász	6,200
14	Dunaújváros	5,533
15	Salgótarján	5,467
16	Egyetértés	4,900
