= 1968 Nemzeti Bajnokság I =

Nemzeti Bajnokság I
- Season: 1968

Statistics of Nemzeti Bajnokság I in the 1968 season.

== Overview ==
It was contested by 16 teams, and Ferencvárosi TC won the championship.

== League standings ==
Pos	Team	Pld	W	D	L	GF	GA	GR	Pts
1	Ferencvárosi TC	30	21	7	2	65	26	2.500	49
2	Újpesti Dózsa	30	20	8	2	102	27	3.778	48
3	Vasas SC	30	18	6	6	66	37	1.784	42
4	Budapest Honvéd FC	30	13	12	5	50	30	1.667	38
5	Csepel SC	30	13	8	9	35	29	1.207	34
6	Pécsi Dózsa	30	10	8	12	34	40	0.850	28
7	Tatabányai Bányász	30	9	10	11	31	38	0.816	28
8	Dunaújvárosi Kohász	30	10	7	13	34	45	0.756	27
9	Vörös Meteor Egyetértés SK	30	7	12	11	34	42	0.810	26
10	Szombathelyi Haladás	30	9	8	13	36	45	0.800	26
11	MTK Budapest FC	30	7	11	12	35	40	0.875	25
12	Salgótarjáni BTC	30	8	9	13	41	55	0.745	25
13	Diósgyőri VTK	30	8	8	14	36	56	0.643	24
14	Győri ETO FC	30	6	11	13	37	48	0.771	23
15	Videoton SC	30	9	3	18	28	57	0.491	21
16	Szegedi EAC	30	5	6	19	26	75	0.347	16

Source: rsssf.com

== Results ==
Home \ Away	CSE	DIÓ	DUN	FTC	HAL	HON	MTK	PÉC	GYŐ	SAL	SZE	TAT	ÚJP	VAS	VID	VME
Csepel		2–0	1–0	0–2	2–0	1–1	2–1	2–1	1–1	3–0	0–1	1–1	1–1	0–1	0–1	2–1
Diósgyőri	1–1		1–2	1–2	1–0	0–1	3–1	2–1	1–1	1–1	3–2	0–0	1–1	2–2	2–0	3–1
Dunaújvárosi Kohász	1–0	2–1		2–1	0–0	1–1	0–0	0–0	4–1	2–1	1–0	1–2	0–2	0–1	3–0	1–1
Ferencváros	4–0	1–0	3–0		2–1	1–0	0–0	4–1	1–1	2–2	4–0	4–1	1–1	2–1	1–0	1–1
Haladás	2–2	2–1	4–0	2–3		2–1	0–0	2–2	2–0	1–0	6–0	1–1	0–6	3–1	2–1	2–1
Budapest Honvéd	1–1	3–0	3–0	4–1	1–0		2–0	3–0	2–2	2–0	3–1	6–1	1–5	2–2	1–2	3–2
MTK Budapest	1–3	4–2	1–2	0–0	1–1	1–1		1–1	3–1	4–2	1–0	1–3	4–2	4–2	3–1	0–0
Pécsi Dózsa	0–1	4–1	1–0	0–1	2–0	0–0	1–0		1–0	4–0	4–2	1–0	0–0	2–2	2–0	0–0
Rába ETO Győr	0–1	4–2	3–1	2–3	1–1	0–0	1–1	3–1		4–1	2–1	1–2	1–1	0–1	2–1	0–0
Salgótarján	1–0	1–2	2–2	1–3	2–1	1–2	0–0	2–0	2–2		4–1	0–0	1–2	4–3	2–2	3–1
Szegedi EAC	0–3	3–3	1–3	1–6	2–0	0–0	2–1	1–1	1–1	0–0		2–1	2–4	0–1	2–1	0–1
Tatabányai Bányász	0–0	0–1	2–2	2–4	1–0	0–0	1–0	3–2	3–0	1–4	0–0		1–1	1–2	3–0	1–0
Újpesti Dózsa	1–2	9–0	4–1	2–2	5–0	2–1	2–1	5–0	5–1	5–0	11–0	1–0		3–0	6–1	5–0
Vasas	3–0	3–0	4–2	0–1	2–0	2–2	2–0	4–0	2–1	3–1	6–1	2–0	1–1		6–1	2–1
Videoton	1–3	1–0	1–0	0–3	3–0	1–2	2–0	0–2	1–0	0–1	1–0	1–0	2–6	1–1		2–2
VM Egyetértés	1–0	1–1	3–1	0–2	1–1	1–1	1–1	1–0	2–1	2–2	3–0	0–0	2–3	2–4	2–0	

Source: rsssf.com
Legend: Blue = home team win; Yellow = draw; Red = away team win.

== Statistical leaders ==
=== Top goalscorers ===
Rank	Scorer	Club	Goals
1	(Hungary) Antal Dunai	Újpesti Dózsa	31
2	(Hungary) Ferenc Bene	Újpesti Dózsa	22
3	(Hungary) Flórián Albert	Ferencvárosi TC	19
3	(Hungary) János Farkas	Vasas SC	19
3	(Hungary) László Fazekas	Újpesti Dózsa	19
6	(Hungary) Lajos Kocsis	Budapest Honvéd	17
7	(Hungary) István Korsós	Vasas SC	16
8	(Hungary) Sándor Iszak	Szombathelyi Haladás	14
9	(Hungary) László Kalmár	Csepel SC	13
9	(Hungary) Lajos Kriskó	Salgótarjáni BTC	13

== Attendances ==
Average home league attendance top 16:

#	Club	Average
1	Ferencváros	18,200
2	Diósgyör	17,333
3	Újpest	15,533
4	Fehérvár	11,333
5	Szombathelyi Haladás	10,800
6	Vasas	9,880
7	MTK	8,633
8	Budapest Honvéd	8,633
9	Tatabánya Bányász	7,500
10	Dunaújváros	6,733
11	Szeged	6,707
12	Egyetértés	6,600
13	Pécs	6,267
14	Csepel	5,887
15	Salgótarján	5,133
16	Győr	5,100
