= Albert Florian =

Albert Florian may refer to:

- Lord Charles Albert Florian Wellesley, 1833 pseudonym of Charlotte Brontë, English writer
- Albert Flórián, Hungarian footballer
