= Ferenc Bene =

Hungarian footballer (1944–2006)

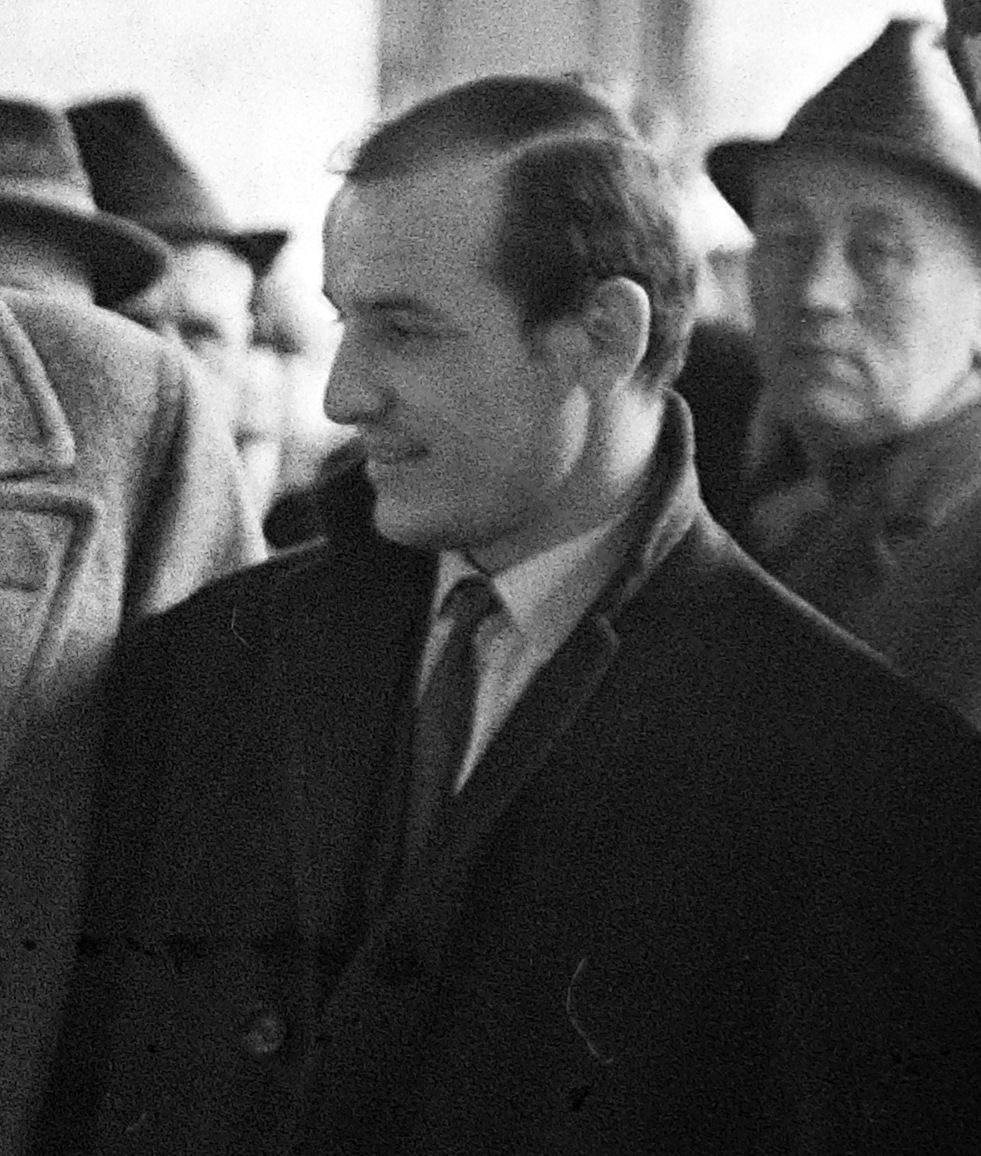
- Bene in 1969

Personal information
- Date of birth: 17 December 1944
- Place of birth: Balatonújlak, Hungary
- Date of death: 27 February 2006 (aged 61)
- Place of death: Budapest, Hungary
- Height: 1.71 m (5 ft 7 in)
- Position: Striker

Youth career
- 1958–1960: MEDOSZ Marcali

Senior career*
Years	Team	Apps	(Gls)
1959	MEDOSZ Marcali	7	(5)
1960–1961	Kaposvár Kinizsi	16	(16)
1961–1978	Újpest	417	(303)
1978–1979	Volán SC		
1981–82	Sepsi-78	55	(17)
1982–83	Volán SC		
1983–84	Soroksári VOSE	12	(5)
1984–85	Kecskeméti SC	15	(1)
Total		522	(347)

International career
1962–1979	Hungary	76	(36)
1963–1964	Hungary Olympic team	13	(24)
1972–1973	Europe XI	2	(1)

Managerial career
- 1992–1993: Újpesti TE
Medal record
Men's football
Representing Hungary
Olympic Games
Gold medal – first place	1964 Tokyo	Team
UEFA European Championship
Bronze medal – third place	1964 Spain
- * Club domestic league appearances and goals

Ferenc Bene (17 December 1944 – 27 February 2006) was a Hungarian footballer who played as a striker for Újpest and Hungary.

He was a member of the team that won the gold medal at the 1964 Summer Olympics, in which he was the top scorer of the tournament with 12 goals in just 5 matches. He is the sixth most prolific goalscorer in total matches in recorded history according to RSSSF with over 1424 goals scored in over 1481 matches, which results in a goal-per-match ratio of almost one. Bene was a successful striker for Újpesti Dózsa (303 goals in 418 matches) and the Hungary national team (36 goals in 76 matches). He was named Hungarian player of the year twice, in 1964 and in 1969.

== Club career ==
=== Early career ===
Ferenc Bene was born on 17 December 1944 in Balatonújlak. He began to play football in 1958 in the youth ranks of MEDOSZ Marcali. Bene made his senior league debut for Dózsa in a fixture against Somogyszob in June 1959 at 14, scoring once. Just two months later, in August 1959, he scored a hat-trick in a league game against Siofok.

In September 1959, Bene scored the only goal for Somogy regional team in a youth tournament match against Baranya. After protests from opponents, the result was annulled on the basis that the then-14-year-old Bene was too young to play for a U-16 selection U16. He was later allowed to play for the county's junior team, but banned from playing for the senior club until his 16th birthday. For this reason, he played only for youth teams for the next 12 months, from September 1959 to September 1960.

Bene was then recruited by Kaposvár Kinizsi, a team from the third division, where he scored 16 goals in 16 matches, including 4 against Mazai Banyasz (4–0) and 6 against Szekszardi Petöfi (7–1).

=== Újpesti Dózsa ===
In 1961 the 17-year-old Bene was discovered by former Hungarian international István Avar, who recommended him to Újpest Dózsa. He then played with Újpest Dózsa for the next 17 years, from 1961 until 1978. In total, he scored 303 goals in 418 matches, thus being one of the main architects behind the team's dominance in the 1970s, as Dózsa won 8 Nemzeti Bajnokság I between 1969 and 1977-78, and also three Magyar Kupa in 1969, 1970, and 1974-75.

Bene was also crucial in helping Dózsa reach the semi-finals of the 1973–74 European Cup, which they lost to Gerd Müller's Bayern Munich. In the following year, in the round of 16 of the 1974–75 European Cup against Benfica, he scored a sensational goal: He kicked the ball out of the goalkeeper's hand and then held the ball in front of him for a long time before flicking to an open net with brilliant situational awareness. This was chosen as the most beautiful goal of the Cup round in Western Europe at the time.

For his efforts at Dózsa, Bene was named Hungarian Footballer of the Year in 1964 and 1969.

=== Later years ===
Leaving the club after the 1978 season, he continued to play for smaller Hungarian teams such as Volán SC (1978–79 and 1983–84) and he even enjoyed a brief spell in Finland playing for Sepsi-78 in 1981–82. He then played for Soroksári VOSE in 1983–84, at the age of 40, scoring 5 goals in 12 matches, and finally ended his career with Kecskeméti SC at the end of the 1984–85 season, having scored only 1 goal in 15 matches.

== International career ==
Bene made his debut for the Hungary national team against Yugoslavia on 14 October 1962, at the age of 17 years 9 months 27 days. He scored his first international goal two caps later, on 19 October 1963, which was the opening goal of a 2–1 victory over East Germany in the round of 16 of the 1964 European Nations' Cup qualifying. He also scored in the quarter-finals against France, and in the tournament, Bene scored in the semi-finals against Spain, which was not enough to prevent a 1–2 defeat. However, Bene scored one more goal at the tournament in the third place play-off against Denmark, thus finishing as the tournament's joint-top scorer alongside teammate Dezső Novák and Chus Pereda of Spain.

In 1963 and 1964, Bene played with both the Hungarian main team and the Hungarian Olympic team simultaneously, overlapping between the two sides and scoring at a prolific rate for both of them. In fact, he scored a brace in each of his first three appearances with the Olympic side, two in friendlies and the other in a 4–0 win over Sweden in the first leg of the 1964 Olympic semifinal round of qualifying, thus helping his side reach the final round of qualifying against Spain in which he scored a brace in both legs as Hungary qualified for the 1964 Olympics. In the Olympic tournament, Bene played a crucial role in helping Hungary winning the gold medal, scoring twelve goals in five matches, including all six in the 6–0 thrashing of Morocco in the group stage, a four-goal haul against United Arab Republic in the semifinals, and the winner against Czechoslovakia in the final. He is one of only four players who have scored two hat-tricks in Olympic football matches, the others being Vilhelm Wolfhagen, Antonín Janda, and Domingo Tarasconi.

He was considered a versatile, offensive player, playing as a center forward in Dózsa. In the national team, he held the position of right winger because of Albert Flórián. He was a player with a strong, muscular build, fast starting speed, and a goal-scoring instinct.

In the 1966 World Cup, Bene scored one goal in each of Hungary's three group stage matches against Portugal, Brazil, and Bulgaria, and then also scored in the quarterfinals, which Hungary lost 1–2 to the Soviet Union. With four goals, Bene was Hungary's top scorer in the World Cup.

On 1 May 1972, he was invited to play a match for a Europe XI against Hamburger SV, organized as a farewell game for Uwe Seeler, and Bene scored once in a 7–3 win.

Bene played his last international match against Czechoslovakia on 12 September 1979. In total, he obtained 76 caps and scored 36 goals.

== Death ==
He died on 27 February 2006 in Budapest, after a lengthy treatment following a fall at the end of 2005. His son Ferenc Bene jr. is also a former player, currently working as a manager.

The football academy of Kaposvári Rákóczi FC bears his name. He also received Officer's Cross of the Order of Merit of the Republic of Hungary in 1994.

== Career statistics ==
=== Club ===
Club performance			League		Cup		League Cup		Continental		Total	
Season	Club	League	Apps	Goals	Apps	Goals	Apps	Goals	Apps	Goals	Apps	Goals
Hungary			League		Hungarian Cup		League Cup		Europe		Total	
1961–62	Újpesti Dózsa	National Championship I	22	6								
1962–63	Újpesti Dózsa	National Championship I	26	23								
1963	Újpesti Dózsa	National Championship I	13	6								
1964	Újpesti Dózsa	National Championship I	26	20								
1965	Újpesti Dózsa	National Championship I	25	20								
1966	Újpesti Dózsa	National Championship I	26	24								
1967	Újpesti Dózsa	National Championship I	30	22								
1968	Újpesti Dózsa	National Championship I	26	22								
1969	Újpesti Dózsa	National Championship I	29	27								
1970	Újpesti Dózsa	National Championship I	14	10								
1970–71	Újpesti Dózsa	National Championship I	30	24								
1971–72	Újpesti Dózsa	National Championship I	30	29								
1972–73	Újpesti Dózsa	National Championship I	30	23								
1973–74	Újpesti Dózsa	National Championship I	29	14								
1974–75	Újpesti Dózsa	National Championship I	28	20								
1975–76	Újpesti Dózsa	National Championship I	18	7								
1976–77	Újpesti Dózsa	National Championship I	12	4								
1977–78	Újpesti Dózsa	National Championship I	3	2								
Total	Hungary		417	303								
Career total			417	303								

=== International goals ===
==== Goals for Hungary Olympic team ====
Hungary score listed first, score column indicates score after each Bene goal.

List of international goals scored by Ferenc Bene
No.	Date	Venue	Opponent	Score	Result	Competition	Source
1	4 May 1963	Népstadion, Budapest, Hungary	Sweden	2–0	4–0	First leg of the 1964 Olympic semifinal round of qualifying	
2	4 May 1963	Népstadion, Budapest, Hungary	Sweden	3–0	4–0	First leg of the 1964 Olympic semifinal round of qualifying	
3	4 December 1963	Dakar, Senegal	Senegal	?	8–3	Olympic Friendly	
4	4 December 1963	Dakar, Senegal	Senegal	?	8–3	Olympic Friendly	
5	6 December 1963	Ivory Coast	Ivory Coast	?	4–1	Olympic Friendly	
6	6 December 1963	Ivory Coast	Ivory Coast	?	4–1	Olympic Friendly	
7	28 December 1963	Stade du 5 Juillet, Algiers, Algeria	Algeria	2–0	3–0	Olympic Friendly	
8	28 December 1963	Stade du 5 Juillet, Algiers, Algeria	Algeria	3–0	3–0	Olympic Friendly	
9	29 April 1964	Palma	Spain	1–1	2–1	First leg of the 1964 Olympic final round of qualifying	
10	29 April 1964	Palma	Spain	2–1	2–1	First leg of the 1964 Olympic final round of qualifying	
11	6 May 1964	Népstadion, Budapest, Hungary	Spain	1–0	3–0	Second leg of the 1964 Olympic final round of qualifying	
12	6 May 1964	Népstadion, Budapest, Hungary	Spain	2–0	3–0	Second leg of the 1964 Olympic final round of qualifying	
13	11 October 1964	National Olympic Stadium, Tokyo, Japan	Morocco	1–0	6–0	1964 Olympic group stages	
14	11 October 1964	National Olympic Stadium, Tokyo, Japan	Morocco	2–0	6–0	1964 Olympic group stages	
15	11 October 1964	National Olympic Stadium, Tokyo, Japan	Morocco	3–0	6–0	1964 Olympic group stages	
16	11 October 1964	National Olympic Stadium, Tokyo, Japan	Morocco	4–0	6–0	1964 Olympic group stages	
17	11 October 1964	National Olympic Stadium, Tokyo, Japan	Morocco	5–0	6–0	1964 Olympic group stages	
18	11 October 1964	National Olympic Stadium, Tokyo, Japan	Morocco	6–0	6–0	1964 Olympic group stages	
19	15 October 1964	Komazawa Olympic Park Stadium, Tokyo, Japan	Yugoslavia	4–2	6–5	1964 Olympic group stages	
20	20 October 1964	Chichibunomiya Rugby Stadium, Tokyo, Japan	United Arab Republic	1–0	6–0	1964 Olympic semifinals	
21	20 October 1964	Chichibunomiya Rugby Stadium, Tokyo, Japan	United Arab Republic	2–0	6–0	1964 Olympic semifinals	
22	20 October 1964	Chichibunomiya Rugby Stadium, Tokyo, Japan	United Arab Republic	5–0	6–0	1964 Olympic semifinals	
23	20 October 1964	Chichibunomiya Rugby Stadium, Tokyo, Japan	United Arab Republic	6–0	6–0	1964 Olympic semifinals	
24	23 October 1964	National Olympic Stadium, Tokyo, Japan	Czechoslovakia	2–0	2–1	1964 Olympic final	

==== Goals for Hungary main team ====
Hungary score listed first, score column indicates score after each Bene goal.

List of international goals scored by Ferenc Bene
No.	Date	Venue	Opponent	Score	Result	Competition
1	19 October 1963	Stadion der Weltjugend, Berlin, Germany	East Germany	1–0	2–1	1964 Euros qualifying round of 16
2	3 November 1963	Népstadion, Budapest, Hungary	East Germany	1–0	3–3	1964 Euros qualifying round of 16
3	23 May 1964	Népstadion, Budapest, Hungary	France	2–1	2–1	1964 Euros qualifying quarter-finals
4	17 June 1964	Santiago Bernabéu, Madrid, Spain	Spain	1–1	1–2	1964 Euros semi-finals
5	20 June 1964	Camp Nou, Barcelona, Spain	Denmark	1–0	3–1	1964 Euros third place play-off
6	23 May 1965	Zentralstadion, Leipzig, Germany	East Germany	1–1	1–1	1966 FIFA World Cup qualification
7	27 June 1965	Népstadion, Budapest, Hungary	Italy	2–1	2–1	Friendly
8	3 May 1966	Stadion Śląski, Chorzów, Poland	Poland	1–0	1–1	Friendly
9	5 June 1966	Népstadion, Budapest, Hungary	Switzerland	2–0	3–1	Friendly
10	5 June 1966	Népstadion, Budapest, Hungary	Switzerland	3–0	3–1	Friendly
11	13 July 1966	Old Trafford, Manchester, England	Portugal	1–1	1–3	1966 World Cup group stages
12	15 July 1966	Goodison Park, Liverpool, England	Brazil	1–0	3–1	1966 World Cup group stages
13	20 July 1966	Old Trafford, Manchester, England	Bulgaria	3–1	3–1	1966 World Cup group stages
14	23 July 1966	Roker Park, Sunderland, England	Soviet Union	1–2	1–2	1966 World Cup quarter-finals
15	21 September 1966	Népstadion, Budapest, Hungary	Denmark	3–0	6–0	UEFA Euro 1968 qualifying
16	23 April 1967	Népstadion, Budapest, Hungary	Yugoslavia	1–0	1–0	Friendly
17	24 May 1967	Københavns Idrætspark, Copenhagen, Denmark	Denmark	2–0	2–0	UEFA Euro 1968 qualifying
18	6 September 1967	Ernst-Happel-Stadion, Vienna, Austria	Australia	1–0	3–1	Friendly
19	8 June 1969	Dalymount Park, Dublin, Ireland	Ireland	2–1	2–1	1970 FIFA World Cup qualification
20	15 June 1969	Københavns Idrætspark, Copenhagen, Denmark	Denmark	1–1	2–3	1970 FIFA World Cup qualification
21	14 September 1969	Stadion Letná, Prague, Czech Republic	Czech Republic	1–0	3–3	1970 FIFA World Cup qualification
22	22 October 1969	Népstadion, Budapest, Hungary	Denmark	1–0	3–0	1970 FIFA World Cup qualification
23	22 October 1969	Népstadion, Budapest, Hungary	Denmark	3–0	3–0	1970 FIFA World Cup qualification
24	5 November 1969	Népstadion, Budapest, Hungary	Ireland	2–0	4–0	1970 FIFA World Cup qualification
25	12 April 1970	Partizan Stadium, Belgrade, Yugoslavia	Yugoslavia	2–2	2–2	Friendly
26	7 October 1970	Ullevaal Stadion, Oslo, Norway	Norway	1–0	3–1	UEFA Euro 1972 qualifying
27	4 April 1971	Ernst-Happel-Stadion, Vienna, Austria	Australia	1–0	2–0	Friendly
28	4 April 1971	Ernst-Happel-Stadion, Vienna, Austria	Australia	2–0	2–0	Friendly
29	9 October 1971	Stade Yves-du-Manoir, Colombes, France	France	1–0	2–0	UEFA Euro 1972 qualifying
30	27 October 1971	Népstadion, Budapest, Hungary	Norway	1–0	4–0	UEFA Euro 1972 qualifying
31	27 October 1971	Népstadion, Budapest, Hungary	Norway	3–0	4–0	UEFA Euro 1972 qualifying
32	14 November 1971	Empire Stadium, Gżira, Malta	Malta	1–0	2–0	1974 FIFA World Cup qualification
33	14 November 1971	Empire Stadium, Gżira, Malta	Malta	2–0	2–0	1974 FIFA World Cup qualification
34	6 May 1972	Szusza Ferenc Stadion, Budapest, Hungary	Malta	2–0	3–0	1974 FIFA World Cup qualification
35	26 September 1973	Partizan Stadium, Belgrade, Yugoslavia	Yugoslavia	1–1	1–1	Friendly
36	31 March 1974	ZTE stadium, Zalaegerszeg, Hungary	Bulgaria	3–0	4–0	Friendly

== Honours ==
Újpest

- Nemzeti Bajnokság I (8): 1969, 1970, 1970-71, 1971-72, 1972-73, 1973-74, 1974-75, 1977-78
- Magyar Kupa: 1969, 1970, 1974-75

Hungary

- Olympic Games: 1964

Individual

- UEFA European Championship Team of the Tournament: 1964
- Hungarian Footballer of the Year: 1964 and 1969
- World XI: 1966, 1967, 1968, 1969
- FUWO European Team of the Season: 1966
- ADN Eastern European Footballer of the Season: 1966

== See also ==
- List of men's footballers with 500 or more goals
- List of footballers who achieved hat-trick records
