= György Szűcs =

Hungarian footballer

Personal information
- Full name: György Szűcs
- Date of birth: 23 April 1912
- Place of birth: Szombathely, Austria-Hungary
- Date of death: 10 December 1991 (aged 79)
- Place of death: Budapest, Hungary
- Height: 1.81 m (5 ft 11 in)
- Position: Midfielder

Senior career*
Years	Team	Apps	(Gls)
1932–1940	Újpest FC	365	(23)

International career
1934–1939	Hungary	25	(0)

Managerial career
- 1955–1958: Salgótarjáni BTC
- 1958–1960: Dorogi Bányász
- 1960–1962: Szegedi EAC
- 1964–1965: Debreceni VSC
- 1965: Salgótarjáni BTC
- 1966–1967: Iran
- 1968–1969: FC Tatabánya
- 1971–1972: Szegedi AK
Medal record
Representing Hungary
FIFA World Cup
Runner-up	1938 France
- * Club domestic league appearances and goals

György Szűcs (23 April 1912, in Szombathely – 10 December 1991, in Budapest) was a Hungarian footballer who played as a midfielder for Újpest FC, as well as on the Hungary national football team at the 1934 and the 1938 FIFA World Cup. He went on to coach Salgótarjáni BTC, SZEAC and Tatabányai Bányász.
