= Leeds United F.C. in European football =

English club in European football

- Club: Leeds United
- Seasons played: 18
- First entry: 1965–66 Inter-Cities Fairs Cup
- Latest entry: 2002–03 UEFA Cup

Titles
- Inter-Cities Fairs Cup: 2 (1968, 1971)

Leeds United first played European football with their appearance in the 1965–66 Inter-Cities Fairs Cup, a competition which they have won twice. Their first European Cup/Champions League appearance came in 1969–70. Leeds' first and last appearance in the Cup Winners' Cup came in 1972–73. Their last appearance in Europe came in the UEFA Cup in 2002–03.

== Summary ==
The club's debut in European competitions came in the 1965–66 season in the Inter-Cities Fairs Cup, which they competed in for three consecutive seasons before winning the trophy in the 1967–68 season. They had been on the losing side in the same competition a year previously, and won it again in 1970–71, the final season of its existence before it was effectively replaced by the new UEFA Cup.

The club reached a further two European finals during the 1970s; the European Cup Winners' Cup final in 1973 and the European Cup final in 1975. However, they were beaten on both occasions. Their venture into the 1979–80 UEFA Cup would be their last in European competitions for more than a decade; it ended in the second round.

European competitions then became effectively out of the question for Leeds, who were relegated to the Second Division in 1982 and did not win promotion until 1990. League title glory in 1992 sealed their return to Europe after more than a decade as England's representatives in the European Cup, where they were eliminated in the second round by Scottish champions Rangers.

In 1999–2000, the club enjoyed its best run in European competitions for 25 years, reaching the semi-finals of the UEFA Cup. They reached the semi-finals of the Champions League in the 2000–2001 season losing to Valencia (changes in qualification requirements meant that they could now qualify as the third placed team in their domestic league) a year later. Their most recent European campaign to date was in the 2002–03 season, where they competed in the UEFA Cup and reached the third round. By this stage, however, the club was deep in financial trouble and was starting to sell most of its key players, which contributed to relegation from the Premier League at the end of the 2003–04.

== Matches ==
Season	Competition	Round	Opposition	Score
1965–66	Inter-Cities Fairs Cup	First Round	(Italy) Torino	2–1 Elland Road; 0–0 (A)
1965–66	Inter-Cities Fairs Cup	Second Round	(East Germany) Leipzig	2–1 (A); 0–0 Elland Road
1965–66	Inter-Cities Fairs Cup	Third Round	(Spain) Valencia	1–1 Elland Road; 1–0 (A)
1965–66	Inter-Cities Fairs Cup	Quarter-Final	(Hungary) Újpest	4–1 Elland Road; 1–1 (A)
1965–66	Inter-Cities Fairs Cup	Semi-Final	(Spain) Real Zaragoza	0–1 (A); 2–1 Elland Road; 1–3 Elland Road
1966–67	Inter-Cities Fairs Cup	First Round	Bye	
1966–67	Inter-Cities Fairs Cup	Second Round	(Netherlands) DWS	3–1 (A); 5–1 Elland Road
1966–67	Inter-Cities Fairs Cup	Third Round	(Spain) Valencia	1–1 Elland Road; 2–0 (A)
1966–67	Inter-Cities Fairs Cup	Quarter-Final	(Italy) Bologna	0–1 (A); 1–0 Elland Road
1966–67	Inter-Cities Fairs Cup	Semi-Final	(Scotland) Kilmarnock	4–2 Elland Road; 0–0 (A)
1966–67	Inter-Cities Fairs Cup	Final	(Socialist Federal Republic of Yugoslavia) Dinamo Zagreb	0–2 Maksimir Stadium, Zagreb; 0–0 Elland Road
1967–68	Inter-Cities Fairs Cup	First Round	Spora Luxembourg	9–0 (A); 7–0 Elland Road
1967–68	Inter-Cities Fairs Cup	Second Round	(Socialist Federal Republic of Yugoslavia) Partizan Belgrade	2–1 (A); 1–1 Elland Road
1967–68	Inter-Cities Fairs Cup	Third Round	(Scotland) Hibernian	1–0 Elland Road; 1–1 (A)
1967–68	Inter-Cities Fairs Cup	Quarter-Final	(Scotland) Rangers	0–0 (A); 2–0 Elland Road
1967–68	Inter-Cities Fairs Cup	Semi-Final	(Scotland) Dundee	1–1 (A); 1–0 Elland Road
1967–68	Inter-Cities Fairs Cup	Final	(Hungary) Ferencváros	1–0 Elland Road; 0–0 Népstadion, Budapest
1968–69	Inter-Cities Fairs Cup	First Round	(Belgium) Standard Liège	0–0 (A); 3–2 Elland Road
1968–69	Inter-Cities Fairs Cup	Second Round	(Italy) Napoli	2–0 Elland Road; 0–2 (A)
1968–69	Inter-Cities Fairs Cup	Third Round	(West Germany) Hannover	5–1 Elland Road; 2–1 (A)
1968–69	Inter-Cities Fairs Cup	Quarter-Final	(Hungary) Újpest	0–1 Elland Road; 0–2 (A)
1969–70	European Cup	First Round	(Norway) Lyn	10–0 Elland Road; 6–0 (A)
1969–70	European Cup	Second Round	(Hungary) Ferencváros	3–0 Elland Road; 3–0 (A)
1969–70	European Cup	Quarter-Final	(Belgium) Standard Liège	1–0 (A); 1–0 Elland Road
1969–70	European Cup	Semi-Final	(Scotland) Celtic	0–1 Elland Road; 1–2 (A)
1970–71	Inter-Cities Fairs Cup	First Round	(Norway) Sarpsborg	1–0 (A); 5–0 Elland Road
1970–71	Inter-Cities Fairs Cup	Second Round	(East Germany) Dynamo Dresden	1–0 Elland Road; 1–2 (A)
1970–71	Inter-Cities Fairs Cup	Third Round	(Czechoslovakia) Sparta Prague	6–0 Elland Road; 3–2 (A)
1970–71	Inter-Cities Fairs Cup	Quarter-Final	(Portugal) Vitória Setúbal	2–1 Elland Road; 1–1 (A)
1970–71	Inter-Cities Fairs Cup	Semi-Final	(England) Liverpool	1–0 (A); 0–0 Elland Road
1970–71	Inter-Cities Fairs Cup	Final	(Italy) Juventus	2–2 Stadio Comunale, Turin; 1–1 Elland Road
1970–71	Inter-Cities Fairs Cup	Fairs Cup Play-off Final	(Spain) Barcelona	1–2 Nou Camp
1971–72	UEFA Cup	First Round	(Belgium) Lierse	0–4 Elland Road; 2–0 (A)
1972–73	European Cup Winners' Cup	First Round	(Turkey) Ankaragücü	1–1 (A); 1–0 Elland Road
1972–73	European Cup Winners' Cup	Second Round	(East Germany) Carl Zeiss Jena	0–0 (A); 2–0 Elland Road
1972–73	European Cup Winners' Cup	Quarter-Final	(Romania) Rapid București	5–0 Elland Road; 3–1 (A)
1972–73	European Cup Winners' Cup	Semi-Final	(Socialist Federal Republic of Yugoslavia) Hajduk Split	1–0 Elland Road; 0–0 (A)
1972–73	European Cup Winners' Cup	Final	(Italy) Milan	0–1 Kaftanzoglio Stadium, Thessaloniki
1973–74	UEFA Cup	First Round	(Norway) Strømsgodset	1–1 (A); 6–1 Elland Road
1973–74	UEFA Cup	Second Round	(Scotland) Hibernian	0–0 Elland Road; 0–0 (A)
1973–74	UEFA Cup	Third Round	(Portugal) Vitória Setúbal	1–0 Elland Road; 1–3 (A)
1974–75	European Cup	First Round	(Switzerland) Zürich	4–1 Elland Road; 1–2 (A)
1974–75	European Cup	Second Round	(Hungary) Újpest	2–1 (A); 3–0 Elland Road
1974–75	European Cup	Quarter-Final	(Belgium) Anderlecht	3–0 Elland Road; 1–0 (A)
1974–75	European Cup	Semi-Final	(Spain) Barcelona	2–1 Elland Road; 1–1 (A)
1974–75	European Cup	Final	(West Germany) Bayern Munich	0–2 Parc des Princes, Paris
1979–80	UEFA Cup	First Round	(Malta) Valletta	4–0 (A); 3–0 Elland Road
1979–80	UEFA Cup	Second Round	(Romania) Universitatea Craiova	0–2 (A); 0–2 Elland Road
1992–93	Champions League	First Round	(Germany) Stuttgart	0–3 (A); 4–1 Elland Round
1992–93	Champions League	Second Round	(Scotland) Rangers	1–2 (A); 1–2 Elland Road
1995–96	UEFA Cup	First Round	(France) AS Monaco	3–0 (A); 0–1 Elland Road
1995–96	UEFA Cup	Second Round	(Netherlands) PSV Eindhoven	3–5 Elland Road; 0–3
1998–99	UEFA Cup	First Round	(Portugal) Marítimo	1–0 Elland Road; 0–1 (A)
1998–99	UEFA Cup	Second Round	(Italy) Roma	0–1 (A); 0–0 Elland Road
1999–2000	UEFA Cup	First Round	(Federal Republic of Yugoslavia) Partizan Belgrade	3–1 (A); 1–0 Elland Road
1999–2000	UEFA Cup	Second Round	(Russia) Lokomotiv Moscow	4–1 Elland Road; 3–0 (A)
1999–2000	UEFA Cup	Third Round	(Russia) Spartak Moscow	1–2 (A); 1–0 Elland Road
1999–2000	UEFA Cup	Fourth Round	(Italy) Roma	0–0 (A); 1–0 Elland Road
1999–2000	UEFA Cup	Quarter-Final	(Czech Republic) Slavia Prague	3–0 Elland Road; 1–2 (A)
1999–2000	UEFA Cup	Semi-Final	(Turkey) Galatasaray	0–2 (A); 2–2 (H)
2000–01	Champions League	Third Qualifying Round	(Germany) 1860 Munich	2–1 Elland Road; 1–0 (A)
2000–01	Champions League	Group H	(Spain) Barcelona	0–4 (A); 1–1 Elland Road
2000–01	Champions League	Group H	(Italy) Milan	1–0 Elland Road; 1–1 (A)
2000–01	Champions League	Group H	(Turkey) Beşiktaş	6–0 Elland Road; 0–0 (A)
2000–01	Champions League	Second Group D	(Spain) Real Madrid	0–2 Elland Road; 2–3 (A)
2000–01	Champions League	Second Group D	(Italy) Lazio	1–0 (A); 3–3 Elland Road
2000–01	Champions League	Second Group D	(Belgium) Anderlecht	2–1 Elland Road; 4–1 (A)
2000–01	Champions League	Quarter-Final	(Spain) Deportivo La Coruña	3–0 Elland Road; 0–2 (A)
2000–01	Champions League	Semi-Final	(Spain) Valencia	0–0 Elland Road; 0–3 (A)
2001–02	UEFA Cup	First Round	(Portugal) Marítimo	0–1 (A); 3–0 Elland Road
2001–02	UEFA Cup	Second Round	(France) Troyes	4–2 Elland Road; 2–3 (A)
2001–02	UEFA Cup	Third Round	(Switzerland) Grasshopper	2–1 (A); 2–2 Elland Road
2001–02	UEFA Cup	Fourth Round	(Netherlands) PSV Eindhoven	0–0 (A); 0–1 Elland Road
2002–03	UEFA Cup	First Round	(Ukraine) Metalurh Zaporizhya	1–0 Elland Road; 1–1 (A)
2002–03	UEFA Cup	Second Round	(Israel) Hapoel Tel Aviv	1–0 Elland Road; 4–1 (A)
2002–03	UEFA Cup	Third Round	(Spain) Málaga	0–0 (A); 1–2 Elland Road
