= Antal Dunai =

Hungarian footballer (born 1943)

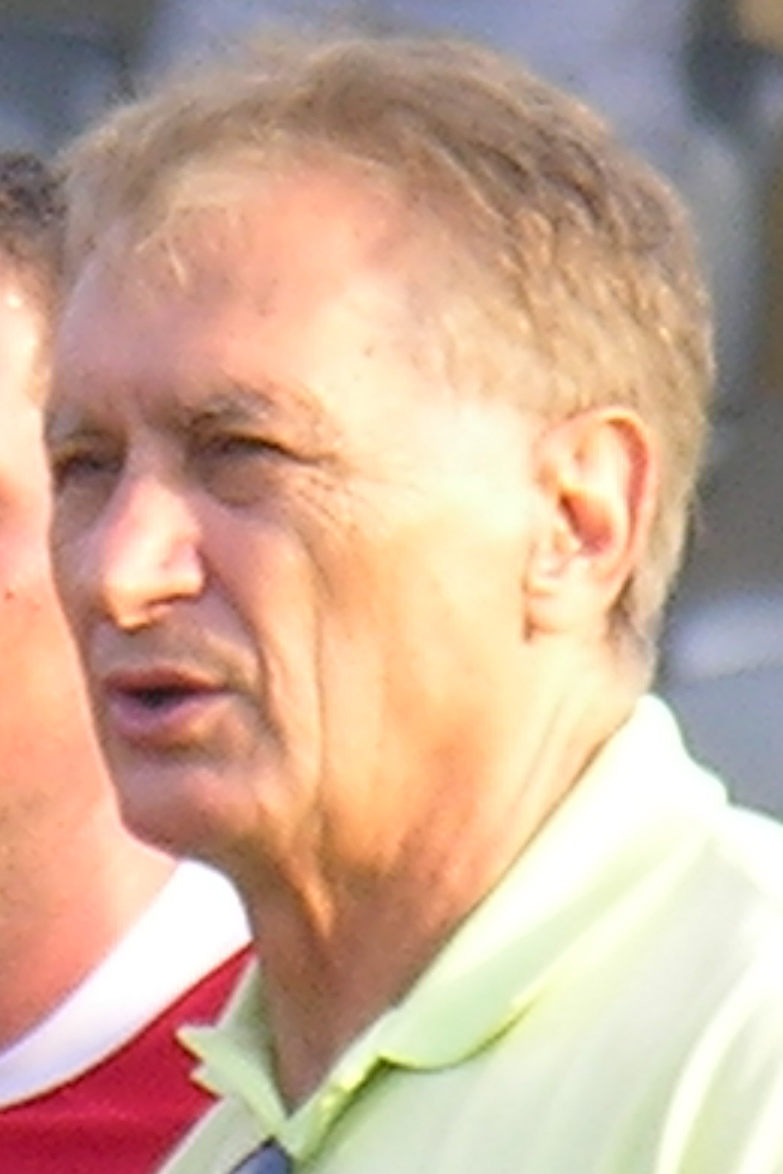
- Dunai in 2011

Personal information
- Birth name: Antal Dujmov
- Date of birth: 21 March 1943 (age 83)
- Place of birth: Gara, Hungary
- Position: Striker

Senior career*
Years	Team	Apps	(Gls)
1961–1964	Pécsi Dózsa		
1965–1976	Újpesti Dózsa	326	(202)
1976–1978	Debrecen	26	(11)
1979–1980	Chinoin		
1981	Simmering		

International career
1969–1973	Hungary	31	(9)

Managerial career
- 1981–1982: Xerez
- 1982: Betis
- 1983–1984: Xerez
- 1985–1986: Castellón
- 1986: Zalaegerszeg
- 1986–1987: Murcia
- 1987–1988: Murcia
- 1990: Levante
- 1991: Veszprém
- 1993–1996: Hungary (Olympic)
- 1996–1997: Debrecen
Medal record
Men's football
Representing Hungary
Men's football
Gold medal – first place	1964 Tokyo	Team competition
Gold medal – first place	1968 Mexico	Team competition
Silver medal – second place	1972 Munich	Team competition
- * Club domestic league appearances and goals

Antal Dunai, also known as Dunai II (né Dujmov, 21 March 1943) is a Hungarian former footballer with Yugoslav origins. He became a first division player at Pécsi Dózsa, but he spent the majority of his career at Újpesti Dózsa from 1965 to 1977, when he moved to Debreceni VSC. He played 31 games and scored 9 goals for the Hungary national team. He is most famous for his participation in the gold medal winning Hungarian team on the 1968, and silver medal winning national team on the 1972 Olympics.

== Career statistics ==
Appearances and goals by club, season and competition
Club	Season	League			Hungarian Cup		League cup		Continental		Total	
Club	Season	Division	Apps	Goals	Apps	Goals	Apps	Goals	Apps	Goals	Apps	Goals
Pécsi Dózsa SC	1961–62	National Championship I	24	12								
Pécsi Dózsa SC	1962–63	National Championship I	18	10								
Pécsi Dózsa SC	1963	National Championship I	13	7								
Pécsi Dózsa SC	1964	National Championship I	22	7								
Pécsi Dózsa SC	Total		77	36								
Újpesti Dózsa	1965	National Championship I	24	12								
Újpesti Dózsa	1966	National Championship I	23	15								
Újpesti Dózsa	1967	National Championship I	30	36								
Újpesti Dózsa	1968	National Championship I	30	32								
Újpesti Dózsa	1969	National Championship I	26	16								
Újpesti Dózsa	1970	National Championship I	0	0								
Újpesti Dózsa	1970–71	National Championship I	46	29								
Újpesti Dózsa	1971–72	National Championship I	29	16								
Újpesti Dózsa	1972–73	National Championship I	22	11								
Újpesti Dózsa	1973–74	National Championship I	6	2								
Újpesti Dózsa	1974–75	National Championship I	14	2								
Újpesti Dózsa	1975–76	National Championship I	18	5								
Újpesti Dózsa	Total		268	176								
Debrecen	1976–77	National Championship I	3	1								
Debrecen	1977–78	National Championship I	23	10								
Debrecen	Total		26	11								
Career total			371	223								

== Sources ==
- MTI Ki Kicsoda 2006, Magyar Távirati Iroda, Budapest, 2005, p. 432.
- Ki kicsoda a magyar sportéletben?, I. kötet (A–H). Szekszárd, Babits Kiadó, 1994, p. 278., ISBN 963-495-008-6
- Bio on nssz.hu
- MLSZ-felköszöntés Dunai Antal 65. születésnapja alkalmából (in Hungarian)
- Profile on mob.hu p. 3.
