= Flórián Albert =

Hungarian footballer

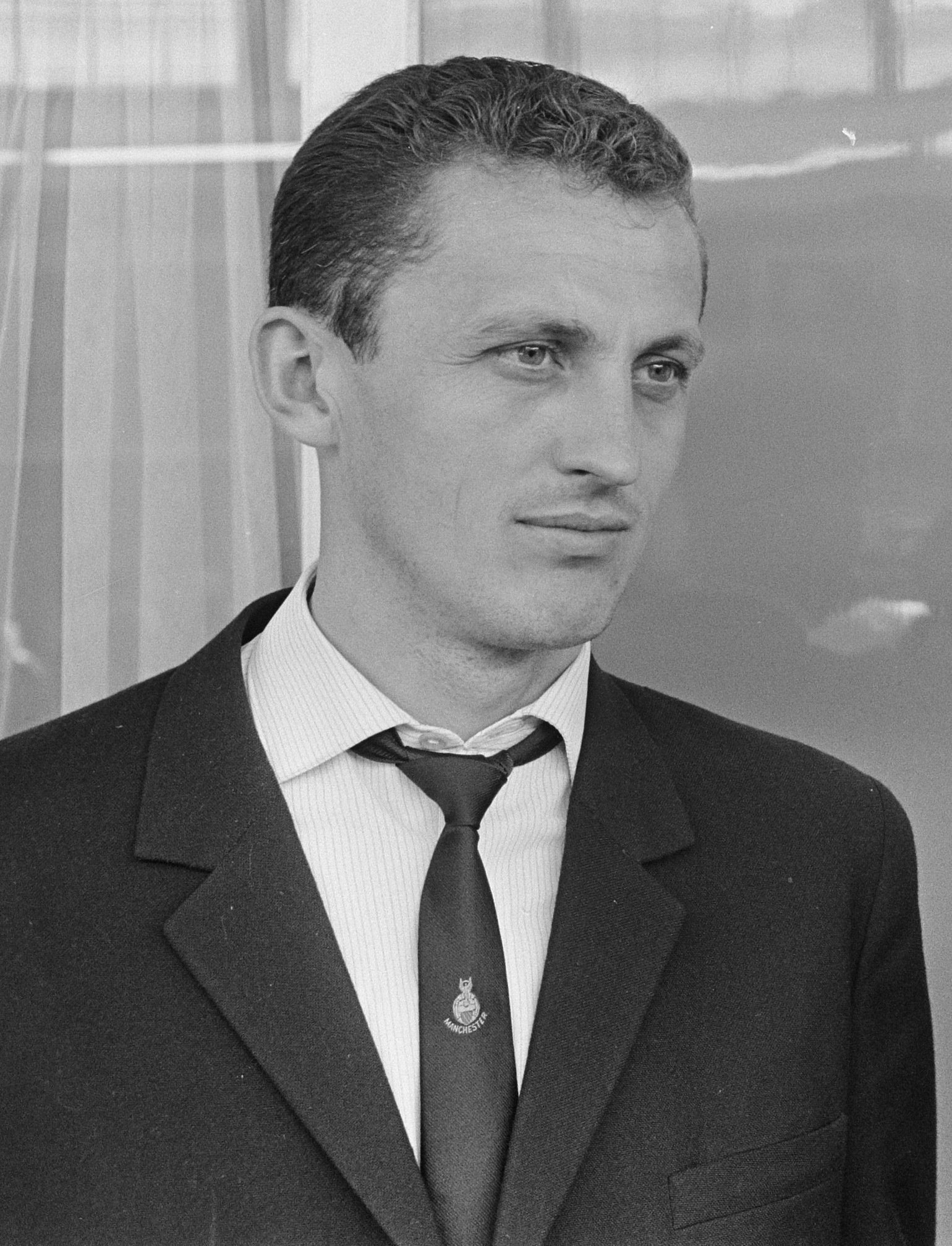
- Albert in 1966

Personal information
- Full name: Flórián György Albert
- Date of birth: 15 September 1941
- Place of birth: Hercegszántó, Hungary
- Date of death: 31 October 2011 (aged 70)
- Place of death: Budapest, Hungary
- Height: 1.81 m (5 ft 11 in)
- Position: Forward

Youth career
- 1952–1958: Ferencváros

Senior career*
Years	Team	Apps	(Gls)
1958–1974	Ferencváros	351	(256)

International career
1959–1974	Hungary	75	(31)

Managerial career
- 1978–1982: Al Ahly Benghazi
- 1985: Al Ahly Benghazi
Medal record
Representing Hungary
UEFA European Championship
Bronze medal – third place	1964 Spain
Olympic Games
Bronze medal – third place	1960 Rome	Team competition
- * Club domestic league appearances and goals

Flórián György Albert (15 September 1941 – 31 October 2011) was a Hungarian professional football player, manager and sports official, who was named European Footballer of the Year in 1967. Nicknamed "The Emperor", he played as a forward, and has been described as one of the most elegant footballers of all time.

A club legend of Ferencvárosi TC, Albert joined the team as a schoolboy and spent his whole playing career at Fradi. He also starred for Hungary, winning 75 international caps and scoring 31 goals. He was joint top-scorer at the 1962 World Cup with four goals and played a key role in Hungary's third-place finish at the European Championship in 1964.

He stayed loyal to Ferencváros after his retirement as well, actively participated in the club's life and also held administrative positions. From 2007 the stadium of Ferencváros bore his name, until 2014 when the new stadium of the team was constructed, named “Groupama Arena”. A statue was erected in his honour in front of the stadium in 2014.

Albert died in October 2011, aged 70, in a hospital in Budapest after complications following heart surgery carried out a few days earlier.

== Early life ==
The son of a blacksmith, Albert was born and brought up in the little town of Hercegszántó near the border with the former Yugoslavia, where he got his first taste of the game playing with his two brothers. His mother was of Šokci origin. She died when he was two. When the family later moved to Budapest, Albert participated on a talent day held by Ferencváros. He impressed the coaches and was selected by the club. Albert was 11 years old at the time.

== Career ==
Albert spent his entire club career with Ferencvárosi TC, where he played from 1952 to 1974. He came through the ranks quickly and made his debut in the senior team on 2 November 1958 against Diósgyőr, in a match in which he hit the back of the net two times. The forward was also spotted by Hungarian national team manager Lajos Baróti in a youth match between Hungary and Yugoslavia, and not much later Albert already received his first call-up. His first appearance in the national selection came on 28 June 1959 against Sweden, who finished runners-up in the World Cup a year earlier. Albert contributed with two assist to Hungary's 3–2 win over the Scandinavians. He scored 31 goals in 75 caps for the Hungarian team, with them he has collected the bronze medal on both of the Olympic Games in 1960 and the European Championship in 1964. At the 1962 World Cup, despite Hungary being knocked out in the quarter-finals, Albert, tied with five others, managed to win the Golden Boot Award with four goals.

On club level, his biggest success came in 1965, when in the Inter-Cities Fairs Cup, Ferencváros, that knocked-out among others AS Roma and Manchester United F.C. en route to the final, triumphed over Juventus FC 1–0 in the decisive match and obtained the cup title.

Florian was an extremely elegant footballer with extraordinary skill and ball control. These qualities ensured that he was highly respected by his opponents. I remember his sensational performance in the game against Brazil at the FIFA World Cup in 1966 in England, which cemented his standing as one of the world's top players.

— FIFA president Sepp Blatter about Albert

Albert appeared in his next World event in 1966 in England, where he produced an excellent display against Brazil in a duel that is regarded as one of the greatest matches in the history of the World Cup. The Magyars, after losing to Portugal in their first round encounter, entered a must-win match against Brazil. Hungary eventually beat the South Americans 3–1, to keep their hopes alive, and Albert, who received a standing ovation from the supporters, made the fans forget the absence of Pelé with his performance. By winning their final group match, Hungary made it to the quarter-finals, just to fall short against the Soviet Union.

The year 1967 was a special one for Albert, who not only won the Hungarian Championship with Ferencváros and collected the Hungarian Player of the Year title, but in December first celebrated the birth of his son, and later he was awarded the Ballon d'Or in recognition of his outstanding attributes. Albert topped the voting with 68 points, twenty-eight ahead of Bobby Charlton, who came second.

In 1968 Albert appeared in the Inter-Cities Fairs Cup final again, this time against Leeds United, but lost by a one-goal margin (0–1). On 15 June 1969, in a World Cup qualifier against Denmark, Albert collided with Knud Engedal, goalkeeper of the Scandinavians, and suffered a serious fractured leg injury. Following that he was sidelined for almost a year and could never win back his form any more. Albert returned into action in the Hungarian Championship on 27 April 1970 against Salgótarján and on 4 April 1971 he played his first international match after the injury, a friendly match against Austria. His final major event was the 1972 European Championship, where he captured fourth place with Hungary, recording two appearances in the tournament. In the same year he captured the Hungarian Cup title for the first time, thus making his collection of domestic silverware complete.

Albert played his final league match on 17 March 1974 against Zalaegerszeg. He came on as a substitute in the second half and contributed to the 3–0 victory with a goal, the last one in his career. Albert, after receiving greetings and gifts from the old boys, the opponents and his son, ran to the stands, bowed for the fans and left the field on the shoulders of his teammates.

Following his retirement, he had two short spells as a manager in Libya with Al-Ahly Benghazi, however, with only limited success. After returning from North Africa, Albert worked for Ferencváros in several positions, such as technical director, department leader and later honorary chairman. In 2007, Ferencváros' stadium was named after him. In the same year, he received a prize in his village of birth, Hercegszántó, becoming an honorable citizen. In 2010 Budapest, a year later, Ferencváros awarded him honorary citizenship.

== Personal life ==
Albert married Irén Bársony, an actress, on 30 November 1963. The couple had two children, a girl, Magdolna, and a son, Flórián Albert Jr., who, like his father, became a football player with Ferencváros, and later had spells in Israel and France and also played for the Hungarian national team. Albert's grandchild, Flórián Patrik, aims to become a professional footballer as well.

== Death ==
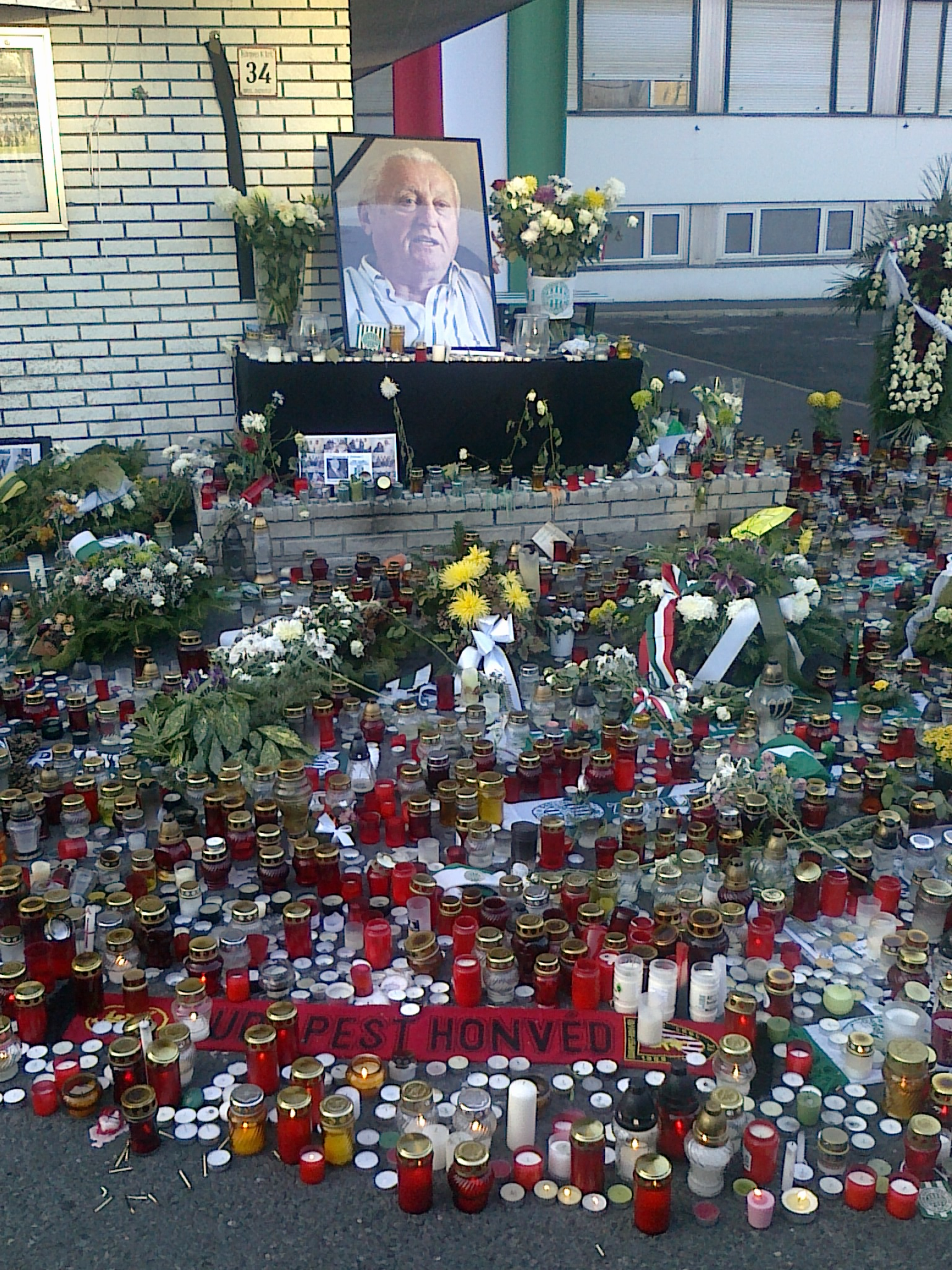
Farewell from Flórián Albert in front of the stadium named after him

On 27 October 2011, Flórián, after suffering a vasoconstriction, underwent coronary artery bypass surgery. Although a press release the following day by his former club Ferencváros stated that the operation had been successful, he subsequently suffered a heart attack and died in the early hours of 31 October 2011.

His funeral took place on 6 November 2011 in the Cemetery of Óbuda. Hundreds of mourners accompanied Albert to his final rest, including Viktor Orbán, Prime Minister of Hungary; Pál Schmitt, President of Hungary; Sándor Csányi, president of the Hungarian Football Federation; Gábor Kubatov, president of Ferencvárosi TC; and former teammates Kálmán Mészöly, Gyula Rákosi, Lajos Szűcs and Tibor Nyilasi. The event was also live broadcast by Hungarian public television Magyar Televízió.

In the afternoon same day, Ferencváros played a league clash against Paksi SE. Before the match the floodlights were switched off and the stadium turned into dark, with candles lit by the fans are being the only lights in the arena. Ferencváros players wore a special all-black kit in the occasion and fans paid tribute to Albert with a banner saying "God shall be with you Emperor". Supporters of SK Rapid Wien, who have close ties with Ferencváros, also shown honor to Albert with a transparent in their game against SV Ried.

The friendly match against Liechtenstein played on 11 November was declared a memorial game for Albert by the Hungarian Football Federation. The clash was originally scheduled to take place at the Sóstói Stadion, but later was moved to the Ferenc Puskás Stadium to give more people the opportunity to attend the event. In the four corners of the arena memorial places were erected, where the supporters could pay their tribute to the Golden Ball winner. A five-minute-long compilation of the best moments of Albert was also projected before the kick-off.

Hungary eventually won the match 5–0 in front of a sold-out crowd with two goals by Balázs Dzsudzsák, and further strikes from Tamás Priskin, Vladimir Koman and Róbert Feczesin. Dzsudzsák commented after the match that he is sure that Flórián would have been happy if he could have seen the match, and added that he hopes they rejoiced him in Heaven.

== Career statistics ==
=== Club ===
Appearances and goals by club, season and competition
Club	Season	League			Hungarian Cup		Europe		Total	
Club	Season	Division	Apps	Goals	Apps	Goals	Apps	Goals	Apps	Goals
Ferencváros	1958–59	National Championship I	15	6	0	0	0	0	15	6
Ferencváros	1959–60	National Championship I	26	27	0	0	0	0	26	27
Ferencváros	1960–61	National Championship I	26	21	0	0	3	2	29	23
Ferencváros	1961–62	National Championship I	22	17	0	0	0	0	22	17
Ferencváros	1962–63	National Championship I	21	11	0	0	6	3	27	14
Ferencváros	1963	National Championship I	12	11	0	0	2	2	14	13
Ferencváros	1964	National Championship I	16	19	2	5	5	3	23	27
Ferencváros	1965	National Championship I	24	27	0	0	9	1	33	28
Ferencváros	1966	National Championship I	25	24	6	7	0	0	31	31
Ferencváros	1967	National Championship I	27	28	7	6	6	4	40	38
Ferencváros	1968	National Championship I	27	19	4	0	5	1	36	20
Ferencváros	1969	National Championship I	13	11	0	0	0	0	13	11
Ferencváros	1970	National Championship I	8	4	0	0	0	0	8	4
Ferencváros	1970–71	National Championship I	24	7	0	0	2	0	26	7
Ferencváros	1971–72	National Championship I	30	15	0	0	8	5	38	20
Ferencváros	1972–73	National Championship I	26	6	0	0	3	0	29	6
Ferencváros	1973–74	National Championship I	9	2	0	0	0	0	0	0
Career total			351	255	19	18	39	21	409	294

=== International ===
Appearances and goals by national team and year
National team	Year	Apps	Goals
Hungary	1959	6	5
Hungary	1960	6	2
Hungary	1961	9	4
Hungary	1962	9	5
Hungary	1963	9	4
Hungary	1964	6	6
Hungary	1965	5	1
Hungary	1966	9	2
Hungary	1967	6	1
Hungary	1968	1	0
Hungary	1969	3	1
Hungary	1970	0	0
Hungary	1971	3	0
Hungary	1972	2	0
Hungary	1973	0	0
Hungary	1974	1	0
Total		75	31

Scores and results list Hungary's goal tally first, score column indicates score after each Albert goal.

List of international goals scored by Flórián Albert
No.	Date	Venue	Opponent	Score	Result	Competition	Ref.
1	11 October 1959	JNA Stadium, Belgrade, Serbia	Yugoslavia	1–0	4–2	Friendly	
2	11 October 1959	JNA Stadium, Belgrade, Serbia	Yugoslavia	2–2	4–2	Friendly	
3	11 October 1959	JNA Stadium, Belgrade, Serbia	Yugoslavia	3–2	4–2	Friendly	
4	25 October 1959	Népstadion, Budapest, Hungary	Switzerland	4–0	8–0	Friendly	
5	8 November 1959	Népstadion, Budapest, Hungary	West Germany	2–0	4–3	Friendly	
6	22 May 1960	Népstadion, Budapest, Hungary	England	1–0	2–0	Friendly	
7	22 May 1960	Népstadion, Budapest, Hungary	England	2–0	2–0	Friendly	
8	17 February 1961	Cairo International Stadium, Cairo, Egypt	Egypt	1–0	2–0	Friendly	
9	17 February 1961	Cairo International Stadium, Cairo, Egypt	Egypt	2–0	2–0	Friendly	
10	16 April 1961	Megyeri úti Stadion, Budapest, Hungary	East Germany	1–0	2–0	1962 FIFA World Cup qualification	
11	7 May 1961	JNA Stadium, Belgrade, Serbia	Yugoslavia	1–0	4–2	Friendly	
12	31 May 1962	Estadio Braden Copper Co, Rancagua, Chile	England	2–1	2–1	1962 FIFA World Cup	
13	3 June 1962	Estadio Braden Copper Co, Rancagua, Chile	Bulgaria	1–0	6–1	1962 FIFA World Cup	
14	3 June 1962	Estadio Braden Copper Co, Rancagua, Chile	Bulgaria	2–0	6–1	1962 FIFA World Cup	
15	3 June 1962	Estadio Braden Copper Co, Rancagua, Chile	Bulgaria	5–0	6–1	1962 FIFA World Cup	
16	7 November 1962	Népstadion, Budapest, Hungary	Wales	1–0	3–1	1964 European Nations' Cup qualification	
17	5 May 1963	Råsunda Stadium, Stockholm, Sweden	Sweden	—	1–2	Friendly	
18	19 May 1963	Népstadion, Budapest, Hungary	Denmark	4–0	6–0	Friendly	
19	27 October 1963	Népstadion, Budapest, Hungary	Austria	1–0	2–1	Friendly	
20	25 April 1964	Stade olympique, Colombes, France	France	1–0	3–1	1964 European Nations' Cup qualification	
21	4 October 1964	Wankdorf Stadium, Bern, Switzerland	Switzerland	1–0	2–0	Friendly	
22	4 October 1964	Wankdorf Stadium, Bern, Switzerland	Switzerland	2–0	2–0	Friendly	
23	11 October 1964	Népstadion, Budapest, Hungary	Czechoslovakia	1–0	2–2	Friendly	
24	11 October 1964	Népstadion, Budapest, Hungary	Czechoslovakia	2–1	2–2	Friendly	
25	25 October 1964	Népstadion, Budapest, Hungary	Yugoslavia	1–0	2–1	Friendly	
26	25 October 1964	Népstadion, Budapest, Hungary	Yugoslavia	2–0	2–1	Friendly	
27	27 June 1965	Népstadion, Budapest, Hungary	Italy	1–0	2–1	Friendly	
28	21 September 1966	Népstadion, Budapest, Hungary	Denmark	1–0	6–0	UEFA Euro 1968 qualification	
29	21 September 1966	Népstadion, Budapest, Hungary	Denmark	4–0	6–0	UEFA Euro 1968 qualification	
30	24 May 1967	Idrætspark, Copenhagen, Denmark	Denmark	1–0	2–0	UEFA Euro 1968 qualification	
31	25 May 1969	Népstadion, Budapest, Hungary	Czechoslovakia	2–0	2–0	1970 FIFA World Cup qualification	

== Honours ==
Ferencváros

- Inter-Cities Fairs Cup: 1964–65
- Hungarian League: 1963, 1964, 1967 and 1968
- Hungarian Cup: 1972

Individual

- Ballon d'Or: 1967
- World Cup Best Young Player Award: 1962
- World Cup top scorer: 1962 (shared with five other players at 4 goals)
- World Cup All-Star Team: 1966
- UEFA European Championship Team of the Tournament: 1964
- FUWO European Team of the Season: 1966, 1967, 1968
- ADN Eastern European Footballer of the Season: 1967
- European Cup top scorer: 1965–66
- Inter-Cities Fairs Cup top scorer: 1966–67
- Hungarian Championship top scorer: 1960, 1961, 1965
- Hungarian Footballer of the Year: 1966, 1967
- Officier's Cross of Order of Merit of the Republic of Hungary: 1994
- Middle Cross of the Order Merit of the Republic of Hungary: 2011
- Sportsperson of the Nation (A Nemzet Sportolója): 2004
- Honorable Citizen of Hercegszántó: 2007
- Honorable Citizen of Budapest: 2010
- Honorable Citizen of Ferencváros: 2011
