= Gyula Rákosi =

Hungarian footballer (born 1938)

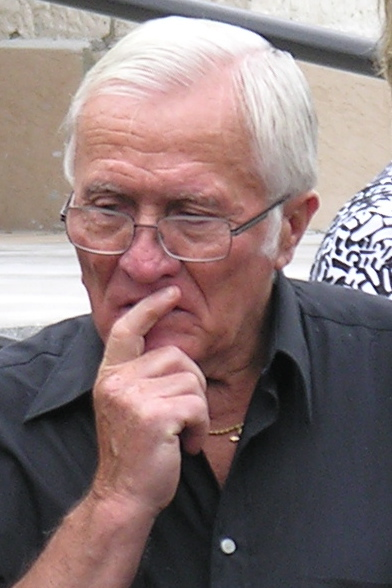

Personal information
- Full name: Gyula Rákosi
- Date of birth: 9 October 1938 (age 88)
- Place of birth: Budapest, Hungary
- Height: 1.74 m (5 ft 8 1/2 in)
- Position: Midfielder

Senior career*
Years	Team	Apps	(Gls)
1957–1972	Ferencvárosi TC	322	(63)
Total		322	(63)

International career
	Hungary	41	(4)

Managerial career
- 1988–1990: Ferencvárosi TC
- 1991–1992: Tatabányai Bányász SC
- * Club domestic league appearances and goals

Olympic medal record

Representing Hungary

Men's football
Bronze medal – third place	1960 Rome	Team competition

Gyula Rákosi (born 9 October 1938) is a Hungarian former footballer.

During his club career he played for Ferencvárosi TC. He earned 41 caps and scored 4 goals for the Hungary national football team from 1960 to 1968, and participated in the 1962 FIFA World Cup, the 1964 European Nations' Cup, and the 1966 FIFA World Cup. He was in the squad of Ferencvárosi TC that has won the 1964–65 Inter-Cities Fairs Cup. He also won a bronze medal in football at the 1960 Summer Olympics. He finished his career in 1972. Later he worked as a coach, inter alia in the Middle East (Kuwait).
