= István Géczi =

Hungarian footballer (1944–2018)

Personal information
- Full name: István Géczi
- Date of birth: 16 March 1944
- Place of birth: Sajóörös, Hungary
- Date of death: 10 September 2018 (aged 74)
- Height: 1.83 m (6 ft 0 in)
- Position: Goalkeeper

Senior career*
Years	Team	Apps	(Gls)
1958–1974	Ferencvárosi TC	309	(0)

International career
1964–1974	Hungary	23	(0)
Medal record
Men's football
Representing Hungary
Olympic Games
Silver medal – second place	1972 Munich	Team competition
- * Club domestic league appearances and goals

István Géczi (Hungarian pronunciation: [ˈiʃtvaːn ˈɡeːt͡si], 16 March 1944 – 10 September 2018) was a Hungarian football goalkeeper, who played for Ferencvárosi TC.

He won a silver medal in football at the 1972 Summer Olympics, and also participated in the 1966 FIFA World Cup and UEFA Euro 1972 for the Hungary national football team.

Following the end of his career, he worked as a teacher and was a member of the Hungarian Parliament in the late 1980s.

== Sources ==
- Ki kicsoda a magyar sportéletben?, I. kötet (A–H). Szekszárd, Babits Kiadó, 1994, 377. o., ISBN 963-495-008-6 (in Hungarian)
- Rejtő László–Lukács László–Szepesi György: Felejthetetlen 90 percek (Sportkiadó, 1977) ISBN 963-253-501-4 (in Hungarian)
- Nagy Béla: Fradisták (Sportpropaganda, 1981) ISBN 963-7542-44-2 (in Hungarian)
- Nagy Béla: Fradi futballkönyv (Sportpropaganda, 1985) ISBN 963-7543-04-X (in Hungarian)
- Dénes Tamás – Rochy Zoltán: A Kupagyőztesek Európa-kupája története (Budapest, 2000) ISBN 963-85967-3-2 (in Hungarian)
