= Miklós Páncsics =

Hungarian footballer

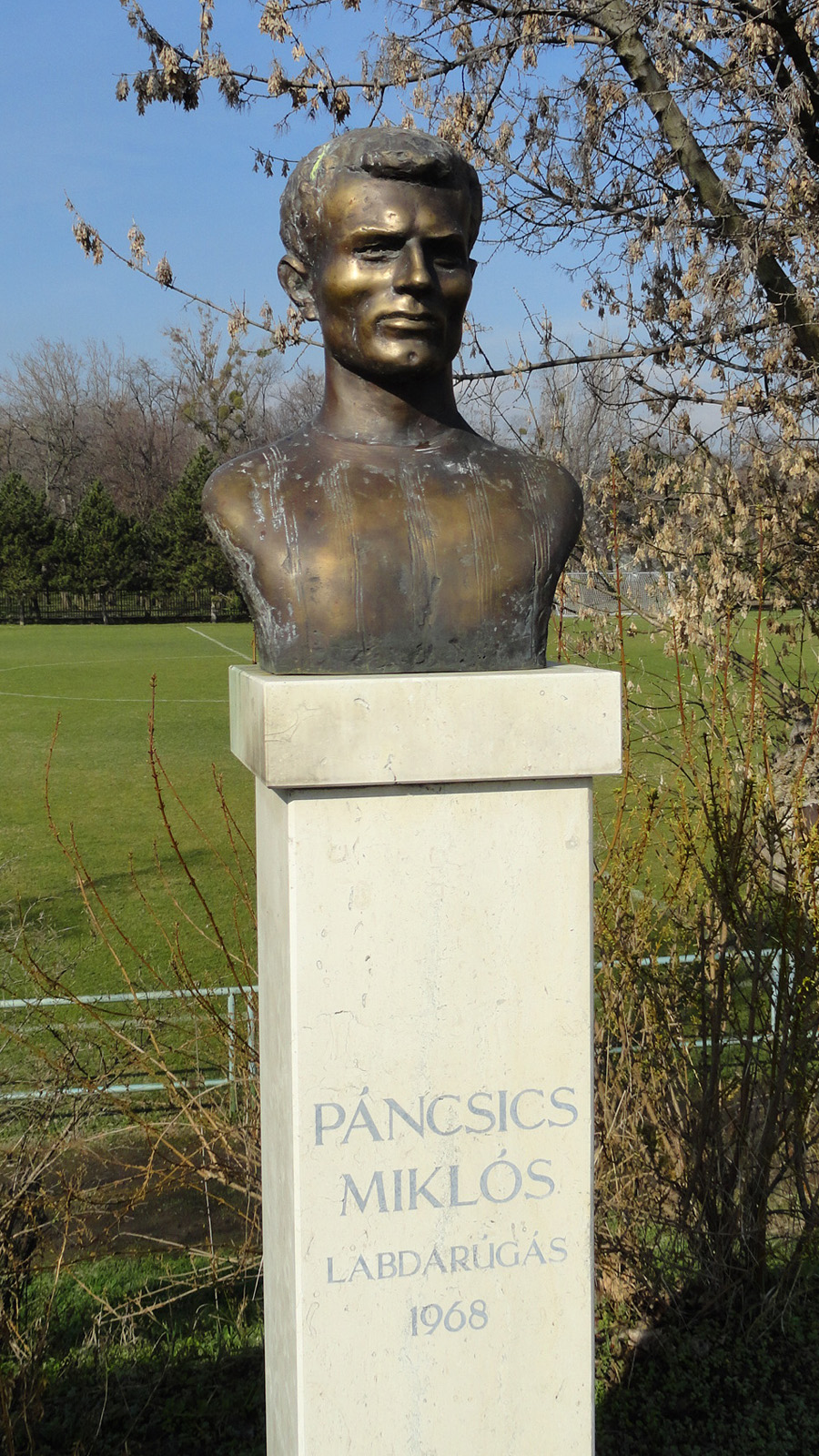
- Bust of Páncsics

Personal information
- Date of birth: 4 February 1944
- Place of birth: Hungary
- Date of death: 6 August 2007 (aged 63)
- Place of death: Hungary
- Position: Defender

Youth career
- Ferencvárosi TC

Senior career*
Years	Team	Apps	(Gls)
1963–1974	Ferencvárosi TC	211	(1)
1974–1976	Budapest Honvéd FC	26	(0)
Total		237	(1)

International career
1962–1974	Hungary	37	(0)
Medal record
Olympic medal record
Representing Hungary
Men's football
Gold medal – first place	1968 Mexico City	Team competition
Silver medal – second place	1972 Munich	Team competition
- * Club domestic league appearances and goals

Miklós Páncsics (4 February 1944 – 6 August 2007) was a Hungarian football defender who played for Ferencvárosi TC and Budapest Honvéd FC. He was of Croat origin.

He won a gold medal in football at the 1968 Summer Olympics and a silver medal in football at the 1972 Summer Olympics, and also participated in UEFA Euro 1972. He earned 37 caps for the Hungary national football team. He later became General Secretary of the Hungarian Football Federation (MLSZ) and held a doctor's degree in law.
