= István Szőke =

Hungarian footballer (1947–2022)

István Szőke (13 February 1947 – 1 June 2022) was a Hungarian footballer who played as a midfielder for Ferencvárosi TC.

He participated in UEFA Euro 1972 for the Hungary national team.
