= Szegedi EAC =

Association football club in Hungary

- Full name: Szegedi Egyetemi Atlétikai Club
- Short name: SZEAC
- Founded: 1921
- Dissolved: 1999
Home colours

Szegedi EAC (Szegedi Egyetemi Atlétikai Club, also known as SZEAC) was a Hungarian football club from the town of Szeged.

== History ==
The club was founded in 1921 as Kitartás Egyetemi Atlétikai Klub. In 1954 the club took the place of Szegedi Honvéd SE in the Hungarian League, but were relegated at the end of the season. They managed to come back in 1956, only to be relegated again two years later. The next season they started their longest spell in the top tier, which lasted six years. They were promoted to and relegated from the top tier another seven times after that. In 1976 the club merged with Szegedi AK and continued under the name Szegedi Egyetemi és Olajipari Atlétikai Klub.

In total the club played 21 seasons in the Hungarian top tier before being dissolved in 1999, eight years after their last appearance in the aforementioned league. A successor club, Szeged LC, was formed that managed to once again reach the highest division in the 1999–00 season. They, however, were immediately relegated and disbanded the same year.

== Honours ==
- Nemzeti Bajnokság II:
  - Winners (6): 1958–59, 1966, 1971–72, 1974–75, 1980–81, 1989–90

== Names ==
- 1921 – 1940 : Kitartás Egyetemi Athlétikai Club (KEAC)
- 1940 – 1948 : Szegedi Egyetemi Athlétikai Club (SZEAC)
- 1949 – 1956 : Szegedi Haladás
- 1956 – 1969 : Szegedi Egyetemi Athlétikai Club (SZEAC)
- 1969 – 1976 : Szegedi Egyetemi és Olajipari Sport Club (SZEOL)
- 1977 – 1985 : Szegedi Egyetemi és Olajipari Atlétikai Klub (SZEOL AK)
- 1985 – 1987 : Szegedi Egyetemi és Olajipari – Délép Sportegyesület (SZEOL-Délép SE)
- 1987 – 1993 : Szeged Sport Club
- 1993 : Szeged Torna Egylet
- 1993 – 1995 : Szeged Football Club
- 1995 – 1999 : Szegedi Egyetemi Athlétikai Club (SZEAC)

== Managers ==
- (Hungary) Károly Lakat (1956–57)
- (Hungary) György Szűcs
