= Tatabányai SC =

Hungarian football club

Tatabánya
- Full name: Tatabányai Sport Club
- Founded: 1910; 116 years ago
- Ground: Stadion Gyula Grosics, Tatabánya
- Capacity: 5,021
- Chairman: Krisztián Bolla
- Manager: Gergely Gyürki
- League: NB III
- 2024–25: NB II, 16th of 16 (relegated)
- Website: www.tatabanyaisc.hu
Home colours	Away colours

Tatabányai Sport Club is a Hungarian football club based in Tatabánya, Komárom-Esztergom, Hungary. The team set to play in Nemzeti Bajnokság II from 2024 to 2025, the second tier of Hungarian football after promotion from Nemzeti Bajnokság III in 2023–24. They play their home games at Stadion Gyula Grosics.

== History ==
The club was founded on February 6, 1910, by Ferenc Frei, a mining engineer. At this time several Hungarian towns outside of Budapest had formed football teams – Debrecen, Miskolc, Győr.

The First World War weakened the team, but in the 1920s the club was still without a doubt the most popular in Tatabánya. Professionalism was introduced into the Hungarian League, but the team could not afford this, and stuck with amateur players. After the end of the Second World War in 1947 the team reached the first division.

After the disqualification from the 2016–17 Nemzeti Bajnokság III season, the club merged with Tatabánya FCE which won the second tier of Komárom-Esztergom division in 2017–18. The new formation failed to rebound back to NB III after close 1–0 defeat against Bicske.

During the outbreak of COVID-19 pandemic in Hungary with Tatabánya being the first in the first tier of Komárom-Esztergom they got promoted for 2020–21 season.

On 9 June 2024, Tatabánya secure promotion to NB II from 2024 to 2025 after defeat Békéscsaba 1-2 and win aggregate 3–4 in 2023–24 NB III promotion play-off, the club return to second tier after 10-year absence.

== Name changes ==
- Tatabányai Sport Club: 1910 – 1949
- in 1947 merger with Tatabányai SC MaDISz andTatabányai SC Barátság
- Tatabányai Tárna: 1949 – 1951
- Tatabányai Bányász SK: 1951 – 1956
- Tatabányai Sport Club: 1956 autumn – 1957 August
- Tatabányai Bányász SC: 1957 – 1992
- Tatabányai Sport Club: 9 March 1992 – 1995
- Tatabányai FC: 1995 – 1996
- Lombard FC Tatabánya: 1996 – 2002
- In 2002 the company that managed the club moved to Szombathely and launched Lombard FC Haladás
- Instead, the company that managed Csepel-Auto Trader moved to Tatabánya and launched its team
- Auto Trader-FC Tatabánya: 2002 – September 2005
- Csőszer FC Tatabánya: September 2005 – 20 September 2005
- Csőszer FC Tatabánya-Auto Trader: 20 September 2005 – 2006
- Football Club Tatabánya: 2006 – March 2007
- Football Club Tatabánya-Vértes Center: March 2007 – June 2007
- Football Club Tatabánya: 2007 – 2010
- Enternet-Football Club Tatabánya: 2010 – June 2011
- Duna Football Club Tatabánya: June 2011 – 2013
- Football Club Tatabánya: 2013 – 2018
- on 20 June 2018, merger with Tatabányai FCE
- Tatabányai Sport Club: 20 June 2018 – 2023
- OPUS TIGÁZ Tatabánya: 2023 –

== Honours ==
- Nemzeti Bajnokság II:
  - Winners (4): 1947–48, 1949–50, 1955, 2004–05
- Nemzeti Bajnokság III:
  - Winners (1): 1993–94

== European cup history ==
=== UEFA Cup Winners' Cup ===
Season	Competition	Round	Country	Club	Home	Away	Aggregate
1985–86	UEFA Cup Winners' Cup	1. Round	(Austria)	SK Rapid Wien	1–1	0–5	1–6

=== UEFA Intertoto Cup ===
Season	Competition	Round	Country	Club	Home	Away	Aggregate
1962–63	UEFA Intertoto Cup	Group 5	(Netherlands)	Ajax Amsterdam	2–1	2–1	
		Group 5	(France)	AS Nancy	4–0	2–1	
		Group 5	(Germany)	1. FC Kaiserslautern	6–2	2–2	
		Quarter-finals	(Switzerland)	FC Servette	6–0	0–1	6–1
		Semi-finals	(Czechoslovakia)	RH Slovnaft Bratislava	1–2	1–1	2–3
1987	UEFA Intertoto Cup	Group 4	(Denmark)	Naestved BK	3–1	4–0	
		Group 4	(Switzerland)	AC Bellinzona	2–0	0–1	
		Group 4	(Czechoslovakia)	DAC Dunajská Streda	6–1	1–0	
1988	UEFA Intertoto Cup	Group 4	(Austria)	First Vienna FC	2–2	1–2	
		Group 4	(Czechoslovakia)	FK Union Cheb	3–2	0–1	
		Group 4	(Denmark)	Vejle BK	0–0	1–1	
1989	UEFA Intertoto Cup	Group 5	(Germany)	Lokomotive Leipzig	0–0	0–0	
		Group 5	(Sweden)	IFK Göteborg	5–3	3–3	
		Group 5	(Denmark)	Lyngby BK	3–1	0–0	
1990	UEFA Intertoto Cup	Group 7	(Switzerland)	FC Luzern	3–4	2–3	
		Group 7	(Slovakia)	FC Nitra	0–0	0–4	
		Group 7	(Sweden)	Örebro SK	1–1	1–5	
1991	UEFA Intertoto Cup	Group 1	(Switzerland)	Neuchâtel Xamax	0–3	0–5	
		Group 1	(Slovakia)	SK Slovan Bratislava	2–1	2–4	
		Group 1	(Sweden)	Malmö FF	1–1	0–0	
2000	UEFA Intertoto Cup	1. Round	(Faroe Islands)	HB Tórshavn	3–0	4–0	7–0
		2. Round	(Croatia)	HNK Cibalia	3–2	0–0	3–2
		3. Round	(Russia)	FC Zenit Saint Petersburg	1–2	1–2	2–4
2001	UEFA Intertoto Cup	1. Round	(Armenia)	FC Shirak	2–3	3–1	5–4
		2. Round	(Moldova)	Tiligul Tiraspol	4–1	1–1	5–2
		3. Round	(Italy)	Brescia Calcio	1–1	1–2	2–3

=== UEFA Cup ===
Season	Competition	Round	Country	Club	Home	Away	Aggregate
1981–82	UEFA Cup	1. Round	(Spain)	Real Madrid CF	2–1	0–1	2–2(a)
1982–83	UEFA Cup	1. Round	(France)	AS Saint-Étienne	0–0	1–4	1–4
1987–88	UEFA Cup	1. Round	(Portugal)	Vitória SC	1–1	0–1	1–2
1988–89	UEFA Cup	1. Round	(West Germany)	VfB Stuttgart	2–1	0–2	2–3

== Seasons ==
The table below shows the seasons of Tatabányai SC.

Season	Tier	Club's name	Position	Pts
1911–12	2	Tatabányai SC	1 / 3	8
1912–13	2	Tatabányai SC	2 / 5	12
1913–14	2	Tatabányai SC	1 / 7	21
1914	-	-	-	-
1915	-	-	-	-
1915	-	-	-	-
1916	-	-	-	-
1916–17	-	-	-	-
1917–18	-	-	-	-
1918–19	2	Tatabányai SC	5 / 6	2
1919–20	2	Tatabányai SC	1 / 6	9
1920–21	2	Tatabányai SC	3 / 8	
1921–22	2	Tatabányai SC	1 / 8	
1922–23	2	Tatabányai SC	10 / 10	-
1923–24	2	Tatabányai SC	4 / 10	21
1924–25	2	Tatabányai SC	5 / 11	23
1925–26	2	Tatabányai SC	2 / 10	26
1926–27	2	Tatabányai SC	3 / 10	24
1927–28	2	Tatabányai SC	2 / 10	24
1928–29	2	Tatabányai SC	1 / 10	32
1929–30	2	Tatabányai SC	1 / 11	34
1930–31	2	Tatabányai SC	1 / 11	32
1931–32	2	Tatabányai SC	2 / 11	34
1932–33	2	Tatabányai SC	2 / 12	33
1933–34	2	Tatabányai SC	2 / 12	29
1934–35	2	Tatabányai SC	3 / 12	29
1935–36	2	Tatabányai SC	3 / 14	37
1936–37	2	Tatabányai SC	6 / 13	25
1937–38	2	Tatabányai SC	1 / 14	41
1938–39	2	Tatabányai SC	10 / 14	23
1939–40	2	Tatabányai SC	10 / 14	23
1940–41	3	Tatabánya SC	7 / 12	22
1941–42	3	Tatabányai SC	5 / 12	28
1942–43	2	Tatabányai SC	10 / 12	18
1943–44	2	Tatabányai SC	8 / 16	29
1944–45	2	Tatabányai SC	2 / 14	13
1944–45	2	Tatabányai SC	0 / 11	
1945–46	2	Tatabányai SC	2 / 14	43
1946–47	2	Tatabányai SC	8 / 14	24
1947–48	2	Tatabányai SC	1 / 14	37
1948–49	1	Tatabányai Tárna	13 / 16	21
1949–50	2	Tatabányai Tárna	1 / 16	48
1950	1	Tatabányai Tárna	16 / 16	6
1951	2	Tatabányai Bányász	2 / 14	42
1952	2	Tatabányai Bányász	2 / 18	51
1953	2	Tatabányai Bányász	2 / 16	44
1954	2	Tatabányai Bányász	2 / 16	48
1955	2	Tatabányai Bányász	1 / 16	47
1956	1	Tatabányai Bányász	7 / 12	22
1957	1	Tatabányai SC	8 / 12	10
1957–58	1	Tatabányai Bányász SC	4 / 14	31
1958–59	1	Tatabányai Bányász SC	6 / 14	31
1959–60	1	Tatabányai Bányász SC	6 / 14	27
1960–61	1	Tatabányai Bányász SC	7 / 14	27
1961–62	1	Tatabányai Bányász SC	4 / 14	31
1962–63	1	Tatabányai Bányász SC	8 / 14	27
1963	1	Tatabányai Bányász SC	9 / 14	13
1964	1	Tatabányai Bányász SC	3 / 14	34
1965	1	Tatabányai Bányász SC	6 / 14	27
1966	1	Tatabányai Bányász SC	3 / 14	32
1967	1	Tatabányai Bányász SC	5 / 16	29
1968	1	Tatabányai Bányász SC	7 / 16	28
1969	1	Tatabányai Bányász SC	8 / 16	28
1970	1	Tatabányai Bányász SC	5 / 8	12
1970–71	1	Tatabányai Bányász SC	8 / 16	30+4=34
1971–72	1	Tatabányai Bányász SC	4 / 16	37
1972–73	1	Tatabányai Bányász SC	11 / 16	25
1973–74	1	Tatabányai Bányász SC	5 / 16	37
1974–75	1	Tatabányai Bányász SC	12 / 16	23
1975–76	1	Tatabányai Bányász SC	9 / 16	28
1976–77	1	Tatabányai Bányász SC	9 / 18	33
1977–78	1	Tatabányai Bányász SC	8 / 18	35
1978–79	1	Tatabányai Bányász SC	7 / 18	35
1979–80	1	Tatabányai Bányász SC	5 / 18	40
1980–81	1	Tatabányai Bányász SC	2 / 18	48
1981–82	1	Tatabányai Bányász SC	3 / 18	43
1982–83	1	Tatabányai Bányász SC	6 / 16	29
1983–84	1	Tatabányai Bányász SC	5 / 16	35
1984–85	1	Tatabányai Bányász SC	12 / 16	28
1985–86	1	Tatabányai Bányász SC	8 / 16	29
1986–87	1	Tatabányai Bányász SC	3 / 16	35
1987–88	1	Tatabányai Bányász SC	2 / 16	37
1988–89	1	Tatabányai Bányász SC	6 / 16	48
1989–90	1	Tatabányai Bányász SC	5 / 16	43
1990–91	1	Tatabányai Bányász SC	6 / 16	33
1991–92	1	Tatabányai SC	15 / 16	20
1992–93	2	Tatabányai SC	14 / 16	24
1993–94	3	Tatabányai SC	1 / 16	39
1994–95	2	Tatabányai SC	12 / 16	32
1995–96	2	Tatabányai FC	14 / 16	22
1996–97	2	Lombard FC Tatabánya	16 / 16	15
1997–98	3	Lombard FC Tatabánya	2 / 16	58
1998–99	2	Lombard FC Tatabánya	1 / 20	83
1999–00	1	Lombard FC Tatabánya	4 / 18	55
2000	1	Lombard FC Tatabánya	1 / 8	29
2000–01	1	Lombard FC Tatabánya	12 / 12	12
2001–02	2	Lombard FC Tatabánya	6 / 12	40
2001–02	2	Lombard FC Tatabánya	6 / 12	37
2002–03	2	FC Tatabánya-Auto Trader	16 / 20	33
2003–04	2	FC Tatabánya-Auto Trader	9 / 18	46
2004–05	2	FC Tatabánya-Auto Trader	1 / 14	62
2005–06	1	Csőszer FC Tatabánya Auto-Trader	5 / 16	41
2006–07	1	FC Tatabánya	12 / 16	36
2007–08	1	FC Tatabánya	15 / 16	10
2008–09	2	FC Tatabánya	4 / 16	51
2009–10	2	FC Tatabánya	5 / 15	45
2010–11	2	Enternet-FC Tatabánya	7 / 16	46
2011–12	2	Duna FC Tatabánya	5 / 16	49
2012–13	2	Duna FC Tatabánya	6 / 16	50
2013–14	2	FC Tatabánya	16 / 16	18
2014–15	3	Tatabánya FC	5 / 16	45
2015–16	3	Tatabánya FC	5 / 17	55
2016–17	3	FC Tatabánya	0 / 18	
2017–18	-	-	-	-
2018–19	4	Tatabányai SC	1 / 14	73
2019–20	4	Tatabányai SC	1 / 13	54
2020–21	3	Tatabányai SC	5 / 20	61
2021–22	3	Tatabányai SC	8 / 20	57
2022–23	3	OPUS TIGÁZ Tatabánya	2 / 20	90
2023–24	3	OPUS TIGÁZ Tatabánya	1 / 16	66
2024–25	2	OPUS TIGÁZ Tatabánya	16 / 16	24
2025–26	3	OPUS TIGÁZ Tatabánya	2 / 16	62

== Selected former managers ==
- (Hungary) Emil Rauchmaul 1937
- (Hungary) Károly Lakat 1957–1962
- (Hungary) Gyula Grosics 1963
- (Hungary) Gábor Kléber 1964–1965
- (Hungary) Nándor Hidegkuti 1966
- (Hungary) László Hári 1967–1968
- (Hungary) György Szűcs 1968–1969
- (Hungary) Károly Lakat 1970–1974
- (Hungary) József Gelei 1974–1975
- (Hungary) Tivadar Monostori 1975
- (Hungary) Ede Moór 1975–1976
- (Hungary) Tivadar Monostori 1977–1979
- (Hungary) Antal Szentmihályi 1979–1980
- (Hungary) Károly Lakat 1980–1982
- (Hungary) Jenő Dalnoki 1982–1984
- (Hungary) István Bacsó 1984–1985
- (Hungary) Károly Lakat 1985
- (Hungary) Miklós Temesvári 1985–1988
- (Hungary) Antal Szentmihályi 1988–1990
- (Hungary) Barnabás Tornyi 1990–1991
- (Hungary) Gyula Rákosi 1991–1992
- (Hungary) Károly Csapó 1992
- (Hungary) Ferenc Ebedli 1997–1998
- (Hungary) Bálint Tóth −1999
- (Hungary) József Kiprich 1999–2001
- (Hungary) Ferenc Ebedli 2001
- (Hungary) László Kovács 2001–
- (Hungary) József Török −2003
- (Hungary) Lajos Détári 2004
- (Hungary) Tibor Sisa 2004–2007
- (Hungary) Barnabás Tornyi 2007
- (Hungary) Ferenc Mészáros 2007
- (Slovakia) László Borbély 2007
- (Ecuador) Octavio Zambrano and László Dajka 2008–2009
- (Hungary) P. László Nagy 2009–2011
- (Hungary) József Kiprich 2011–2012
- (Hungary) Aurél Csertői 2012–2013
- (Hungary) P. László Nagy 2013
- (Hungary) Péter Bozsik 2013–2014
- (Hungary) Gyula Plotár 2014 (caretaker)
- (Hungary) Attila Miskei 2014–
