= Salgótarjáni BTC =

Hungarian football club

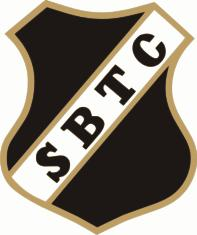
- Full name: Salgótarjáni Barátok Torna Club
- Nickname: Stécé
- Short name: SBTC
- Founded: 1920; 106 years ago
- Ground: Szojka Ferenc Stadion
- Capacity: 7,000 (2,500 seated)
- Manager: Szilárd Sebestyén
- League: NB III; Northeast
- 2023–24: NB III; Northeast, 14th of 16
- Website: sbtc.hu
| Home colours | Away colours |

Salgótarjáni Barátok Torna Club is a Hungarian football club from the town of Salgótarján, that competes in the Nemzeti Bajnokság III – Northeast, the third tier of Hungarian football.

== History ==
Salgótarjáni Barátok Torna Club debuted in the 1935–36 season of the Hungarian League and finished third.

In 2020, the club celebrated their 100th years anniversary of their establishment.

On 28 September 2021, Béla Lakatos, manager of the club, resigned.

In the 2022–23 Megyei Bajnokság I season, Salgótarján did not play their home matches at the Szojka Ferenc Stadion due to the increases in the expenses.

== Name Changes ==
- 1920–1922: Salgótarjáni Torna Club
- 1922–1949: Salgótarjáni Bányatelepi Torna Club
- 1949–1951: Salgótarjáni Tárna Sport Egyesület
- 1951–?: Salgótarjáni Bányász Sport Kör
- ?-1977: Salgótarjáni Bányász Torna Club
- 1977: merger with Egyesült a Salgótarjáni Kohász SE
- 1977–1984: Salgótarjáni Torna Club
- 1984: exit as Salgótarjáni Kohász SE
- 1984–1988: Salgótarjáni Bányász Torna Club
- 1988–1992: Salgótarjáni Barátság Torna Club
- 1992: Salgótarjáni Síküveg SE joined
- 1992–1993: Salgótarjáni Barátság Torna Club-Salgglas Sport Egyesület
- 1993: Salgótarjáni Síküveg SE exit
- 1993–2001: Salgótarjáni Barátság Torna Club
- 2001–2012: Salgótarjáni Barátok Torna Club
- 2003: Salgó Öblös-Faipari SC joined
- 2012–?: Salgótarjáni Barátok Torna Club-Puebla
- ?-: Salgótarjáni Barátok Torna Club

== Honours ==
- Nemzeti Bajnokság II:
  - Winners (3): 1939–40, 1964, 1977–78
- Nemzeti Bajnokság III:
  - Winners (3): 1961–62, 1988–89, 1993–94
- Magyar Kupa:
  - Runner-up (2): 1940–41, 1955–58

== Seasons ==
The table below shows the seasons of Salgótarjáni BTC.

| Season | Tier | Club's name | Position | Pts |
|---|---|---|---|---|
| 1920–21 | 2 | Salgótarjáni TC | 5 / 6 | 5 |
| 1921–22 | 2 | Salgótarjáni TC | 3 / 8 | |
| 1922–23 | 2 | Salgótarjáni BTC | 1 / 8 | |
| 1923–24 | 2 | Salgótarjáni BTC | 1 / 8 | 18 |
| 1924–25 | 2 | Salgótarjáni BTC | 1 / 8 | 25 |
| 1925–26 | 2 | Salgótarjáni Bányatelepi TC | 4 / 10 | 21 |
| 1926–27 | 2 | Salgótarjáni Bányatelepi TC | 2 / 9 | 15 |
| 1927–28 | 2 | Salgótarjáni BTC | 4 / 11 | 20 |
| 1928–29 | 2 | Salgótarjáni Bányatelepi TC | 10 / 10 | - |
| 1929–30 | 3 | Salgótarjáni BTC | 4 / 8 | 17 |
| 1930–31 | 3 | Salgótarjáni BTC | 2 / 10 | 27 |
| 1931–32 | 3 | Salgótarjáni BTC | 1 / 11 | 34 |
| 1932–33 | 2 | Salgótarjáni BTC | 1 / 11 | 28 |
| 1933–34 | 2 | Salgótarjáni BTC | 1 / 10 | 30 |
| 1934–35 | 2 | Salgótarjáni BTC | 1 / 10 | 34 |
| 1935–36 | 1 | Salgótarjáni BTC | 13 / 14 | 13 |
| 1936–37 | 2 | Salgótarjáni BTC | 4 / 12 | 33 |
| 1937–38 | 2 | Salgótarjáni BTC | 7 / 14 | 31 |
| 1938–39 | 2 | Salgótarjáni BTC | 5 / 14 | 34 |
| 1939–40 | 2 | Salgótarjáni BTC | 1 / 16 | 57 |
| 1940–41 | 1 | Salgótarjáni BTC | 8 / 14 | 24 |
| 1941–42 | 1 | Salgótarjáni BTC | 9 / 16 | 29 |
| 1942–43 | 1 | Salgótarjáni BTC | 5 / 16 | 34 |
| 1943–44 | 1 | Salgótarjáni BTC | 7 / 16 | 30 |
| 1944–45 | 1 | Salgótarjáni BTC | 6 / 16 | 5 |
| 1945–46 | 1 | Salgótarjáni BTC | 17 / 10 | 18 |
| 1945–46 | 1 | Salgótarjáni BTC | 8 / 14 | 23 |
| 1946–47 | 2 | Salgótarjáni BTC | 2 / 14 | 45 |
| 1947–48 | 1 | Salgótarjáni BTC | 9 / 17 | 26 |
| 1948–49 | 1 | Salgótarjáni Tárna | 11 / 16 | 26 |
| 1949–50 | 1 | Salgótarjáni Tárna | 10 / 16 | 28 |
| 1950 | 1 | Salgótarjáni Tárna | 7 / 16 | 16 |
| 1951 | 1 | Salgótarjáni Bányász | 9 / 14 | 21 |
| 1952 | 1 | Salgótarjáni Bányász | 10 / 14 | 20 |
| 1953 | 1 | Salgótarjáni Bányász SK | 9 / 14 | 23 |
| 1954 | 1 | Salgótarjáni Bányász SK | 11 / 14 | 22 |
| 1955 | 1 | Salgótarjáni Bányász SK | 6 / 14 | 24 |
| 1956 | 1 | Salgótarjáni Bányász | 5 / 12 | 24 |
| 1957 | 1 | Salgótarjáni Bányász TC | 6 / 12 | 12 |
| 1957–58 | 1 | Salgótarjáni Bányász TC | 6 / 14 | 27 |
| 1958–59 | 1 | Salgótarjáni Bányász TC | 8 / 14 | 25 |
| 1959–60 | 1 | Salgótarjáni Bányász TC | 9 / 14 | 23 |
| 1960–61 | 1 | Salgótarjáni Bányász TC | 5 / 14 | 31 |
| 1961–62 | 1 | Salgótarjáni Bányász TC | 11 / 14 | 21 |
| 1962–63 | 1 | Salgótarjáni Bányász TC | 13 / 14 | 18 |
| 1963 | 2 | Salgótarjáni BTC | 6 / 16 | 17 |
| 1964 | 2 | Salgótarjáni BTC | 1 / 16 | 38 |
| 1965 | 1 | Salgótarjáni Bányász TC | 9 / 14 | 23 |
| 1966 | 1 | Salgótarjáni Bányász TC | 11 / 14 | 18 |
| 1967 | 1 | Salgótarjáni Bányász TC | 13 / 16 | 25 |
| 1968 | 1 | Salgótarjáni Bányász TC | 12 / 16 | 25 |
| 1969 | 1 | Salgótarjáni Bányász TC | 10 / 16 | 25 |
| 1970 | 1 | Salgótarjáni BTC | 7 / 8 | 10 |
| 1970–71 | 1 | Salgótarjáni BTC | 7 / 16 | 34+2=36 |
| 1971–72 | 1 | Salgótarjáni Bányász TC | 3 / 16 | 39 |
| 1972–73 | 1 | Salgótarjáni Bányász TC | 10 / 16 | 25 |
| 1973–74 | 1 | Salgótarjáni Bányász TC | 9 / 16 | 32 |
| 1974–75 | 1 | Salgótarjáni Bányász TC | 8 / 16 | 26 |
| 1975–76 | 1 | Salgótarjáni Bányász TC | 8 / 16 | 28 |
| 1976–77 | 1 | Salgótarjáni Bányász TC | 17 / 18 | 25 |
| 1977–78 | 2 | Salgótarjáni TC | 1 / 20 | 56 |
| 1978–79 | 1 | Salgótarjáni TC | 13 / 18 | 31 |
| 1979–80 | 1 | Salgótarjáni TC | 17 / 18 | 20 |
| 1980–81 | 2 | Salgótarjáni TC | 5 / 20 | 44 |
| 1981–82 | 2 | Salgótarjáni TC | 5 / 16 | 35 |
| 1982–83 | 2 | Salgótarjáni TC | 3 / 20 | 47 |
| 1983–84 | 2 | Salgótarjáni TC | 16 / 20 | 33 |
| 1984–85 | 2 | Salgótarjáni BTC | 5 / 20 | 43 |
| 1985–86 | 2 | Salgótarjáni BTC | 7 / 20 | 37 |
| 1986–87 | 2 | Salgótarjáni BTC | 10 / 20 | 36 |
| 1987–88 | 2 | Salgótarjáni BTC | 19 / 20 | 29 |
| 1988–89 | 3 | Salgótarjáni BTC | 3 / 16 | 63 |
| 1989–90 | 3 | Salgótarjáni BTC | 5 / 16 | 47 |
| 1990–91 | 3 | SBTC | 5 / 16 | 34 |
| 1991–92 | 3 | Salgótarjáni BTC | 4 / 16 | 39 |
| 1992–93 | 2 | SBTC-Salgglas | 15 / 16 | 20 |
| 1993–94 | 3 | Salgótarjáni BTC | 1 / 16 | 52 |
| 1994–95 | 2 | Salgótarjáni BTC | 2 / 16 | 53 |
| 1995–96 | 2 | Salgótarjáni Barátság TC | 7 / 16 | 46 |
| 1996–97 | 2 | Salgótarjáni BTC | 8 / 16 | 40 |
| 1997–98 | 2 | Salgótarjáni BTC | 9 / 20 | 52 |
| 1998–99 | 2 | Salgótarjáni BTC | 4 / 20 | 67 |
| 1999–00 | 4 | Salgótarjáni BTC | 11 / 16 | 38 |
| 2000–01 | 5 | Salgótarjáni BTC | 8 / 16 | 41 |
| 2001–02 | 5 | Salgótarjáni BTC | 10 / 17 | 41 |
| 2002–03 | 5 | Salgótarjáni BTC | 8 / 16 | 42 |
| 2003–04 | 3 | Salgótarjáni BTC | 12 / 16 | 33 |
| 2004–05 | 3 | Salgótarjáni BTC | 15 / 16 | 23 |
| 2005–06 | 3 | Salgótarjáni BTC | 15 / 16 | 17 |
| 2006–07 | 4 | Salgótarjáni BTC | 2 / 24 | 8 |
| 2006–07 | 4 | Salgótarjáni BTC | 1 / 12 | 56 |
| 2007–08 | 4 | Salgótarjáni BTC | 2 / 12 | 47 |
| 2007–08 | 4 | Salgótarjáni BTC | 3 / 23 | 2 |
| 2008–09 | 4 | Salgótarjáni BTC | 13 / 18 | 34 |
| 2009–10 | 4 | Salgótarjáni BTC | 1 / 16 | 65 |
| 2010–11 | 3 | Salgótarjáni BTC | 7 / 16 | 40 |
| 2011–12 | 3 | Salgótarjáni BTC | 10 / 15 | 36 |
| 2012–13 | 3 | Salgótarjáni BTC-Puebla | 7 / 14 | 37 |
| 2013–14 | 4 | Salgótarjáni BTC-Puebla | 1 / 16 | 76 |
| 2014–15 | 3 | Salgótarjáni BTC | 14 / 16 | 19 |
| 2015–16 | 4 | Salgótarjáni BTC | 10 / 14 | 27 |
| 2016–17 | 4 | Salgótarjáni BTC | 3 / 14 | 54 |
| 2017–18 | 4 | Salgótarjáni BTC | 1 / 12 | 64 |
| 2018–19 | 3 | Salgótarjáni BTC | 14 / 16 | 29 |
| 2019–20 | 4 | Salgótarjáni BTC | 1 / 16 | 50 |
| 2020–21 | 3 | Salgótarjáni BTC | 16 / 20 | 41 |
| 2021–22 | 3 | Salgótarjáni BTC | 17 / 20 | 31 |
| 2022–23 | 4 | Salgótarjáni BTC | 1 / 15 | 77 |
| 2023–24 | 3 | Salgótarjáni BTC | 14 / 16 | 34 |
| 2024–25 | 3 | Salgótarjáni BTC | 15 / 16 | 29 |
| 2025–26 | 4 | Salgótarjáni BTC | 1 / 14 | 67 |
