= List of Zalaegerszegi TE managers =

Zalaegerszegi TE is a professional football club based in Zalaegerszeg, Hungary.

== Managers ==
As of 24 June 2025.

| Manager | Nationality | From | To | P | W | D | L | GF | GA | Win | Honours | Notes |
|---|---|---|---|---|---|---|---|---|---|---|---|---|
| Imre Koszta † | Hungary | 1936 | | | | | | | | | | |
| István Szeder † | Hungary | 1957 | | | | | | | | | | |
| Miklós Vadas † | Hungary | 1957 | | | | | | | | | | |
| Pál Csengei † | Hungary | 1958 | | | | | | | | | | |
| Rudolf Jeny † | Hungary | 1958 | 1959 | | | | | | | | | |
| István Szeder † | Hungary | 1960 | | | | | | | | | | |
| András Mátsay † | Hungary | 1961 | | | | | | | | | | |
| István Nádas † | Hungary | 1961 | | | | | | | | | | |
| Nándor Bányai † | Hungary | 1961 | 1963 | | | | | | | | | |
| Pál Titkos † | Hungary | 1963 | | | | | | | | | | |
| István Göncz † | Hungary | 1964 | | | | | | | | | | |
| István Pyber | Hungary | 1965 | 1967 | | | | | | | | | |
| János Szőcs † | Hungary | 1968 | 1978 | | | | | | | | | |
| Béla Kárpáti | Hungary | 1978 | | | | | | | | | | |
| Tibor Palicskó † | Hungary | 1978 | 1980 | | | | | | | | | |
| Mihály Lantos † | Hungary | 1980 | 1981 | | | | | | | | | |
| János Szőcs | Hungary | 1981 | 1982 | | | | | | | | | |
| István Rónai | Hungary | 1982 | 1983 | | | | | | | | | |
| Imre Gellei | Hungary | 1 July 1983 | 30 June 1986 | | | | | | | | | |
| Antal Dunai | Hungary | 1 July 1986 | 30 November 1986 | | | | | | | | | |
| Rezső Szabó | Hungary | 1986 | 1988 | | | | | | | | | |
| Kálmán Mészöly † (caretaker) | Hungary | 11 May 1988 | 30 June 1988 | | | | | | | | | |
| István Rónai | Hungary | 1988 | 1989 | | | | | | | | | |
| Zoltán Kereki | Hungary | 1989 | 1990 | | | | | | | | | |
| Gábor Madár | Hungary | 1 July 1990 | 14 October 1991 | | | | | | | | | |
| Sir István Mihalecz | Hungary | 15 October 1991 | 20 August 1993 | 22 | 3 | 5 | 14 | 15 | 41 | | | |
| József Bita | Hungary | 1993 | | | | | | | | | | |
| Gábor Madár | Hungary | 13 July 1993 | 30 April 1996 | 52 | 18 | 13 | 21 | 80 | 93 | | | |
| János Szőcs | Hungary | 1 May 1996 | 30 June 1996 | 8 | 2 | 3 | 3 | 13 | 11 | | | |
| László Pusztai | Hungary | 1 July 1996 | 17 March 1997 | 20 | 7 | 1 | 12 | 18 | 34 | | | |
| Lajos Garamvölgyi | Hungary | 17 March 1997 | 30 June 1998 | 48 | 19 | 11 | 18 | 74 | 59 | | | |
| László Strausz | Hungary | 10 June 1998 | 16 June 1999 | 34 | 15 | 8 | 11 | 43 | 37 | | | |
| Barnabás Tornyi | Hungary | 1 July 1999 | 13 September 1999 | 5 | 2 | 2 | 1 | 7 | 2 | | | |
| Zoltán Leskó | Hungary | | | | | | | | | | | |
| László Disztl | Hungary | | | | | | | | | | | |
| Róbert Glázer | Hungary | 1 July 2000 | 30 June 2001 | | | | | | | | | |
| Gábor Madár (caretaker) | Hungary | 26 January 2001 | 18 March 2001 | | | | | | | | | |
| Péter Bozsik | Hungary | 1 July 2001 | 1 September 2003 | 43 | 19 | 6 | 18 | 71 | 71 | | 2001–02 Nemzeti Bajnokság I | |
| Sir István Mihalecz (2nd spell) | Hungary | 2 September 2003 | 14 February 2004 | 11 | 3 | 1 | 7 | 15 | 17 | | | |
| Imre Gellei | Hungary | 15 February 2004 | 31 May 2005 | 36 | 15 | 9 | 12 | 54 | 48 | | | |
| László Dajka | Hungary | 8 July 2005 | 10 December 2005 | 16 | 5 | 1 | 10 | 25 | 33 | | | |
| Lázár Szentes | Hungary | 19 December 2005 | 8 May 2006 | 11 | 2 | 5 | 4 | 13 | 19 | | | |
| Antal Simon | Hungary | 9 May 2006 | 12 April 2007 | 27 | 15 | 5 | 7 | 44 | 31 | | | |
| Tamás Nagy | Hungary | 12 April 2007 | 30 June 2007 | 7 | 4 | 1 | 2 | 15 | 7 | | | |
| Slavko Petrović | Serbia | 1 July 2007 | 30 April 2008 | 27 | 11 | 5 | 11 | 46 | 38 | | | |
| Attila Supka | Hungary | 1 July 2008 | 5 October 2008 | 10 | 3 | 2 | 5 | 13 | 16 | | | |
| János Csank | Hungary | 10 October 2008 | 27 August 2011 | 104 | 50 | 25 | 29 | 180 | 152 | | | |
| László Prukner | Hungary | 5 September 2011 | 1 June 2012 | 24 | 1 | 9 | 14 | 21 | 47 | | | |
| Sándor Preisinger | Hungary | 25 June 2012 | 25 March 2013 | 20 | 8 | 3 | 9 | 30 | 34 | 40 | | |
| Antal Simon | Hungary | 25 March 2013 | 17 September 2013 | 17 | 8 | 5 | 4 | 28 | 19 | 47.06 | | |
| Miklós Lendvai † | Hungary | 17 September 2013 | 30 June 2014 | 24 | 8 | 10 | 6 | 37 | 36 | 33.34 | | |
| Emil Lőrincz | Hungary | 20 June 2014 | 8 November 2014 | 13 | 4 | 4 | 5 | 18 | 20 | 30.77 | | |
| Miklós Lendvai † (2nd spell) | Hungary | 9 November 2014 | 3 June 2015 | 17 | 6 | 4 | 7 | 24 | 27 | 35.29 | | |
| János Csank (2nd spell) | Hungary | 11 June 2015 | 25 April 2016 | 27 | 14 | 4 | 9 | 44 | 31 | 51.85 | | |
| Jr. István Mihalecz | Hungary | 25 August 2016 | 30 June 2016 | 6 | 4 | 1 | 1 | 13 | 5 | 66.67 | | |
| Tamás Artner | Hungary | 20 December 2017 | 20 June 2018 | 19 | 7 | 3 | 9 | 23 | 27 | 36.84 | | |
| Tamás Nagy (2nd spell) | Hungary | 1 July 2018 | 4 September 2018 | 7 | 4 | 2 | 1 | 12 | 8 | 57.14 | | |
| Barna Dobos | Hungary | 6 September 2018 | 10 February 2020 | 55 | 28 | 11 | 16 | 104 | 69 | 50.91 | 2018–19 Nemzeti Bajnokság II | |
| Gábor Márton | Hungary | 10 February 2020 | 30 June 2020 | 17 | 9 | 4 | 4 | 34 | 23 | 52.94 | | |
| Gábor Boér | Hungary | 12 July 2020 | 15 March 2021 | 31 | 11 | 5 | 15 | 61 | 59 | 35.48 | | |
| Róbert Waltner | Hungary | 15 March 2021 | 27 March 2022 | 34 | 13 | 10 | 11 | 53 | 48 | 38.24 | | |
| Balázs Molnár (interim) | Hungary | | | | | | | | | | | |
| Ricardo Moniz | Netherlands | 1 July 2022 | 24 April 2023 | 33 | 13 | 7 | 13 | 43 | 37 | 39.4 | | |
| Gábor Boér (2nd spell) | Hungary | 24 April 2023 | 12 November 2023 | 23 | 8 | 4 | 11 | 31 | 41 | 34.78 | 2022–23 Magyar Kupa | |
| Gábor Márton (2nd spell) | Hungary | 13 November 2023 | 23 April 2025 | 54 | 20 | 13 | 21 | 85 | 79 | 37.04 | | |
| Jr. István Mihalecz (2nd spell) | Hungary | 23 April 2025 | 16 June 2025 | 5 | 0 | 5 | 0 | 1 | 1 | | | |
| Nuno Campos | Portugal | 24 June 2025 | 6 June 2026 | 39 | 18 | 9 | 12 | 75 | 52 | | | |
| Filipe Çelikkaya | Portugal | 22 June 2026 | | | | | | | | | | |
