= List of Zalaegerszegi TE seasons =

Zalaegerszegi Torna Egylet is a professional Hungarian football club based in Zalaegerszeg, Hungary.

== Key ==
Nemzeti Bajnokság I

- Pld = Matches played
- W = Matches won
- D = Matches drawn
- L = Matches lost
- GF = Goals for
- GA = Goals against
- Pts = Points
- Pos = Final position

Hungarian football league system

- NB I = Nemzeti Bajnokság I
- NB II = Nemzeti Bajnokság II
- NB III = Nemzeti Bajnokság III
- MB I = Megyei Bajnokság I

Magyar Kupa

- F = Final
- SF = Semi-finals
- QF = Quarter-finals
- R16 = Round of 16
- R32 = Round of 32
- R64 = Round of 64
- R128 = Round of 128

UEFA

- F = Final
- SF = Semi-finals
- QF = Quarter-finals
- Group = Group stage
- PO = Play-offs
- QR3 = Third qualifying round
- QR2 = Second qualifying round
- QR1 = First qualifying round
- PR = Preliminary round

Winners	Runners-up	Third	Promoted	Relegated

== Seasons ==
As of 13 September 2025.

Season	League										Cup	UEFA		Manager	Ref.
Season	Tier	Div.	Pld	W	D	L	GF	GA	Pts.	Pos.	Cup	Competition	Result	Manager	Ref.
2001–02	1	NB I	38	21	8	9	76	47	71	1st	?	Did not qualify		(Hungary) Bozsik	
2002–03	1	NB I	32	15	8	9	62	49	53	7th	?	Champions League	3QR	(Hungary) Bozsik	
2003–04	1	NB I	32	11	6	15	25	47	39	7th	?	Did not qualify		(Hungary) Bozsik, (Hungary) Mihalecz Sr., (Hungary) Gellei	
2004–05	1	NB I	30	13	5	12	48	45	44	6th	?	Did not qualify		(Hungary) Gellei	
2005–06	1	NB I	30	9	8	13	42	47	35	11th	?	Did not qualify		(Hungary) Dajka, (Hungary) Szentes, (Hungary) Simon	
2006–07	1	NB I	30	17	4	9	54	38	55	3rd	?	Did not qualify		(Hungary) Simon, (Hungary) Nagy	
2007–08	1	NB I	30	13	7	10	55	39	46	7th	?	Did not qualify		(Hungary) Petrović, (Hungary) M. Nagy	
2008–09	1	NB I	30	15	7	8	52	44	52	4th	?	Did not qualify		(Hungary) Supka, (Hungary) Csank	
2009–10	1	NB I	30	15	8	7	59	45	53	5th	?	Did not qualify		(Hungary) Csank	
2010–11	1	NB I	30	14	6	10	51	47	48	4th	?	Did not qualify		(Hungary) Csank	
2011–12	1	NB I ↓	30	1	10	19	25	65	13	16th	?	Did not qualify		(Hungary) Prukner	
2012–13	2	NB II	30	15	6	9	50	35	51	4th	?	Did not qualify		(Hungary) Preisinger, (Hungary) Simon	
2013–14	2	NB II	30	9	12	9	43	48	39	9th	?	Did not qualify		(Hungary) Lendvai, (Hungary) Lőrincz	
2014–15	2	NB II	30	10	8	2	42	47	38	8th	?	Did not qualify		(Hungary) Lendvai	
2015–16	2	NB II	30	17	4	9	55	30	55	3rd	?	Did not qualify		(Hungary) Csank, (Hungary) Mihalecz Jr.	
2016–17	2	NB II	38	14	13	11	56	49	55	7th	R16	Did not qualify		(Hungary) Csató, (Serbia) Spišljak	
2017–18	2	NB II	38	12	8	18	45	58	44	16th	R16	Did not qualify		(Hungary) Artner	
2018–19	2	NB II ↑	37	24	7	6	72	41	79	1st	R64	Did not qualify		(Hungary) Dobos	
2019–20	1	NB I	33	11	10	12	51	44	43	7th	QF	Did not qualify		(Hungary) Dobos	
2020–21	1	NB I	33	10	7	16	58	58	37	9th	QF	Did not qualify		(Hungary) Márton, (Hungary) Boér, (Hungary) Waltner	
2021–22	1	NB I	33	10	9	14	44	58	39	8th	R32	Did not qualify		(Hungary) Waltner, (Hungary) Molnár (interim)	
2022–23	1	NB I	33	10	9	14	37	43	39	9th	W	Did not qualify		(Netherlands) Moniz, (Hungary) Boér	
2023–24	1	NB I	33	12	7	14	54	60	43	9th	R16	Conference League	2QR	(Hungary) Boér, (Hungary) Márton	
2024–25	1	NB I	33	7	13	13	35	42	34	10th	SF	Did not qualify		(Hungary) Márton, (Hungary) Mihalecz Jr.	
2025–26	1	NB I	6	0	4	2	10	14	4	11th	R32	Did not qualify		(Portugal) Campos	

Notes

- Note 1:
