= 2011–12 Nemzeti Bajnokság I =

Nemzeti Bajnokság I
- Season: 2011–12
- Dates: 15 July 2011 – 27 May 2012
- Country: Hungary
- Champions: Debrecen
- Relegated: Vasas; ZTE
- Champions League: Debrecen
- Europa League: Videoton; Honvéd; MTK (via cup)
- Matches: 240
- Goals: 648 (2.7 per match)
- Top goalscorer: Adamo Coulibaly (20)
- Biggest home win: Videoton 7–0 Siófok
- Biggest away win: ZTE 0–4 Honvéd; Újpest 1–5 Debrecen
- Highest scoring: Kaposvár 4–4 Paks; Paks 4–4 Pécs
- Longest winning run: Debrecen, Győr (7 games each)
- Longest unbeaten run: Debrecen (30 games)
- Longest winless run: ZTE (25 games)
- Longest losing run: Pécs (7 games)

The 2011–12 Nemzeti Bajnokság I, also known as NB I for short, was the 110th season of top-tier football in Hungary. The league was officially named OTP Bank Liga for sponsorship reasons. The season began on 15 July 2011 and ended on 27 May 2012. Videoton were the defending champions, having won their first Hungarian championship at the end of the 2010–11 season.

== Overview ==
The tournament was contested by 16 teams, and Debreceni VSC won the title under headcoach Elemér Kondás, claiming their sixth national title. The team from Hajdú-Bihar county went undefeated throughout the entire season, becoming the first Hungarian team since Vasas to win the championship undefeated in 1966, and the first ever club outside of Budapest to complete an invincible season.

DVSC started off the campaign by winning 7 consecutive games, and were leading the table by 9 points by the winter break. The red and whites' championship was confirmed on the 12th of May, after Debrecen thrashed Pécsi-MFC 4–0 at the Nagyerdei Stadium in front of 10,500 fanatics.

Videoton FC, the defending champions, won 9 of their last 10 fixtures, but could not repeat the leaugetitle glory of the previous season, and had to settle for a 2nd-place finish.

== Teams ==
Szolnok and MTK finished the 2010–11 season in the bottom two places of the table and thus were relegated to their respective NB II divisions. MTK ended a 16-year stay in the top league, while Szolnok were relegated after just one year in the league.

The two relegated teams were replaced with the champions of the two 2010–11 NB II groups, Diósgyőr of the East Group and Pécs of the West Group. Diósgyőr made their immediate comeback to the league, while Pécs returned to the competition after an absence of four seasons.

=== Stadia and locations ===
Location of teams in 2011–12 Nemzeti Bajnokság I

Club	Short name	City	Stadium	Capacity
Debreceni VSC	Debrecen	Debrecen	Oláh Gábor utcai stadion	9,640
Diósgyőri VTK	Diósgyőr	Miskolc	DVTK Stadion	11,300
Ferencvárosi TC	Ferencváros	Budapest	Albert Flórián Stadion	18,100
Győri ETO FC	Győr	Győr	ETO Park	16,000
Szombathelyi Haladás	Haladás	Szombathely	Rohonci úti stadion	12,000
Budapest Honvéd FC	Honvéd	Budapest	Bozsik József Stadion	10,000
Kaposvári Rákóczi FC	Kaposvár	Kaposvár	Rákóczi Stadion	7,000
Kecskeméti TE	Kecskemét	Kecskemét	Széktói Stadion	6,300
Paksi SE	Paks	Paks	Fehérvári úti stadion	4,950
Lombard-Pápa TFC	Pápa	Pápa	Perutz Stadion	4,500
Pécsi MFC	Pécs	Pécs	PMFC Stadion	7,000
BFC Siófok	Siófok	Siófok	Révész Géza utcai stadion	10,500
Újpest FC	Újpest	Budapest	Szusza Ferenc Stadion	13,500
Vasas SC	Vasas	Budapest	Illovszky Rudolf Stadion	12,000
Videoton FC	Videoton	Székesfehérvár	Sóstói Stadion	15,000
Zalaegerszegi TE	ZTE	Zalaegerszeg	ZTE Aréna	9,000

=== Personnel and kits ===
Note: Flags indicate national team as has been defined under FIFA eligibility rules. Players may hold more than one non-FIFA nationality.

Team	Manager	Captain	Kit manufacturer	Shirt sponsor
Debrecen	(Hungary) Elemér Kondás	(Hungary) Péter Szakály	Adidas	TEVA
Diósgyőr	(Hungary) Lázár Szentes	(Hungary) Péter Takács	Nike	
Ferencváros	(Hungary) Tamás Nagy ^{1}	(Hungary) Dénes Rósa	Nike	Groupama
Győr	(Hungary) Attila Pintér	(Georgia (country)) Rati Aleksidze	Puma	Audi
Haladás	(Hungary) Tamás Artner	(Hungary) Péter Halmosi	Legea	Sopron Bank Burgenland
Honvéd	(Hungary) Attila Supka	(Hungary) András Debreceni	Nike	Opel
Kaposvár	(Hungary) Tibor Sisa	(Hungary) Kornél Kulcsár	Kappa	FxPro
Kecskemét	(Hungary) István László Szabó	(Hungary) Attila Tököli	Jako	Bertrant
Paks	(Hungary) Károly Kis	(Hungary) Dániel Böde	Jako	mvm
Pápa	(Hungary) Ferenc Bene, Jr.	(Hungary) Norbert Tóth	Jako	Lombard
Pécs	(Hungary) Olivér Mink	(Hungary) Levente Lantos	Puma	
Siófok	(Hungary) István Mihalecz, Jr. ^{2}	(Hungary) Thomas Sowunmi	Puma	AVE
Újpest	TBD ^{3}	(Hungary) Péter Kabát	Puma	GDF Suez
Vasas	(Croatia) Marijan Vlak	(Slovakia) Jozef Gašpar	Lancast	
Videoton	(Portugal) Paulo Sousa	(Hungary) Zoltán Lipták	Nike	MOL
ZTE	(Hungary) László Prukner	(Hungary) András Horváth	Mass	

Notes

^{1} Lajos Détári was the leader of the coaching staff, but he didn't have the necessary licence.
^{2} Károly Horváth was the leader of the coaching staff, but he didn't have the necessary licence.
^{3} From 11 April Marc Leliévre was the caretaker manager of Újpest.

==== Managerial changes ====
Team	Outgoing manager	Manner of departure	Date of vacancy	Position in table	Replaced by	Date of appointment
Videoton	(Hungary) György Mezey	Contract expired	Summer 2011	Pre-season	(Portugal) Paulo Sousa	1 June 2011
Újpest	(Hungary) Géza Mészöly	Sacked	10 August 2011	15th	(Serbia) Zoran Spisljak	10 August 2011
Vasas	(Hungary) András Komjáti	Sacked	15 August 2011	15th	(Croatia) Marijan Vlak	15 August 2011
Ferencváros	(Hungary) László Prukner	Resigned	15 August 2011	13th	(Hungary) Tamás Nagy ^{1}	30 August 2011
ZTE	(Hungary) János Csank	Sacked	27 August 2011	16th	(Hungary) László Prukner	5 September 2011
Pápa	(Hungary) György Véber	Sacked	24 October 2011	9th	(Hungary) Ferenc Bene Jr.	26 October 2011
Kecskemét	(Serbia) Tomislav Sivić	Mutual agreement	23 November 2011	6th	(Hungary) István László Szabó ^{2}	13 December 2011
Haladás	(Hungary) Zoltán Aczél	Sacked	14 December 2011	11th	(Hungary) Tamás Artner	19 December 2011
Vasas	(Croatia) Marijan Vlak	Sacked	16 January 2012	12th	(Hungary) Flórián Urbán	16 January 2012
Győr	(Hungary) Aurél Csertői	Mutual agreement	5 March 2012	2nd	(Hungary) Attila Pintér	6 March 2012
Diósgyőr	(Hungary) Miklós Benczés	Mutual agreement	2 April 2012	5th	(Hungary) Lázár Szentes	2 April 2012
Pécs	(Hungary) Ferenc Mészáros	Sacked	2 April 2012	6th	(Hungary) Olivér Mink	4 April 2012
Vasas	(Hungary) Flórián Urbán	Sacked	10 April 2012	15th	(Croatia) Marijan Vlak	12 April 2012
Újpest	(Serbia) Zoran Spisljak	Mutual agreement	11 April 2012	12th	TBD ^{3}	

Notes

^{1} Between 15 and 30 August Tamás Nagy was the caretaker manager of Ferencváros.
^{2} Between 23 November and 13 December István László Szabó was the caretaker manager of Kecskemét.
^{3} From 11 April Marc Leliévre was the caretaker manager of Újpest.

== League table ==
Pos	Team	Pld	W	D	L	GF	GA	GD	Pts	Qualification or relegation
1	Debrecen (C)	30	22	8	0	64	18	+46	74	Qualification for Champions League second qualifying round
2	Videoton	30	21	3	6	58	19	+39	66	Qualification for Europa League second qualifying round (Note: Since Debrecen won both the league and the 2011–12 Hungarian Cup competition, the second qualifying round berth transferred to the second-placed team of the league, and cup runners-up MTK (playing in the 2011–12 Nemzeti Bajnokság II) inherited the respective spot in the first qualifying round.)
3	Győr	30	20	3	7	56	31	+25	63	Ineligible for 2012–13 European competitions (Note: Győr have been suspended from participating in UEFA competitions for the first season they qualify between the 2011–12 and 2013–14 seasons in relation to club licensing violations. As a consequence, since they finish in any of the top three positions, the respective qualifying spots have been allocated to the team(s) immediately below.)
4	Honvéd	30	13	7	10	48	40	+8	46	Qualification for Europa League first qualifying round
5	Kecskemét	30	13	6	11	48	38	+10	45	
6	Paks	30	12	9	9	47	51	−4	45	
7	Diósgyőr	30	13	4	13	42	43	−1	43	
8	Haladás	30	9	11	10	39	37	+2	38	
9	Siófok	30	9	9	12	30	41	−11	36	
10	Kaposvár	30	7	14	9	35	42	−7	35	
11	Ferencváros	30	9	7	14	32	35	−3	34	
12	Pécs	30	8	10	12	36	50	−14	34	
13	Újpest	30	8	8	14	34	46	−12	32	
14	Pápa	30	8	6	16	26	40	−14	30	
15	Vasas (Note: Vasas were deducted 2 points due unauthorized play of Haris Mehmedagić.) (R)	30	5	9	16	29	51	−22	22	Relegation to Nemzeti Bajnokság II
16	ZTE (R)	30	1	10	19	25	65	−40	13	Relegation to Nemzeti Bajnokság II

Source: MLSZ (in Hungarian)
Rules for classification: 1st points; 2nd overall wins; 3rd goal difference; 4th goals scored
(C) Champions; (R) Relegated

=== Positions by round ===
Team ╲ Round	1	2	3	4	5	6	7	8	9	10	11	12	13	14	15	16	17	18	19	20	21	22	23	24	25	26	27	28	29	30
Debrecen	1	1	1	1	1	1	1	1	1	1	1	1	1	1	1	1	1	1	1	1	1	1	1	1	1	1	1	1	1	1
Videoton	9	5	8	6	8	5	7	5	6	6	3	5	6	5	4	3	3	3	3	3	3	3	3	3	3	3	2	2	2	2
Győr (Note: Győr have been suspended from participating in UEFA competitions between the 2011–12 and 2013–14 seasons in relation to club licensing violations. As a consequence, should they finish in any of the top three positions, the respective qualifying spots have been allocated to the team(s) immediately below.)	4	3	3	3	2	2	2	2	2	2	2	2	2	2	2	2	2	2	2	2	2	2	2	2	2	2	3	3	3	3
Honvéd	12	8	5	5	4	4	4	4	3	3	4	4	3	3	5	4	4	4	4	4	4	4	4	4	4	4	4	4	4	4
Kecskemét	11	7	6	8	7	6	5	7	8	7	7	6	4	7	6	6	7	6	6	7	7	7	5	5	5	5	5	5	5	5
Paks	3	9	11	7	6	10	9	9	11	11	10	8	8	8	8	8	8	8	8	8	8	8	8	8	6	6	6	6	6	6
Diósgyőr	2	6	7	9	9	8	6	8	5	4	6	3	5	4	3	5	5	7	7	6	5	5	6	6	7	7	7	7	7	7
Haladás	14	14	13	13	12	11	11	11	9	9	9	10	10	11	12	11	11	12	10	10	9	10	10	11	11	10	8	8	8	8
Siófok	10	11	9	10	10	9	10	10	10	10	11	11	12	14	14	15	14	14	14	12	11	11	11	10	10	11	12	11	9	9
Kaposvár	8	12	10	11	11	12	12	12	12	13	13	14	15	15	15	14	13	15	11	13	14	13	13	13	14	13	13	14	13	10
Ferencváros	7	10	12	12	13	13	14	15	15	15	15	15	13	12	10	12	9	9	9	9	10	9	9	9	9	9	10	9	10	11
Pécs	6	4	2	2	3	3	3	3	4	5	5	7	7	6	7	7	6	5	5	5	6	6	7	7	8	8	9	10	11	12
Újpest	13	13	14	15	14	14	15	14	14	12	14	13	14	13	13	10	10	11	13	11	12	12	12	12	12	12	11	12	12	13
Pápa	5	2	4	4	5	7	8	6	7	8	8	9	9	10	11	13	15	10	12	14	15	14	14	14	13	14	14	13	14	14
Vasas	15	15	16	14	15	15	13	13	13	14	12	12	11	9	9	9	12	13	15	15	13	15	15	15	15	15	15	15	15	15
ZTE	16	16	15	16	16	16	16	16	16	16	16	16	16	16	16	16	16	16	16	16	16	16	16	16	16	16	16	16	16	16

Leader
2012–13 UEFA Europa League Second qualifying round
2012–13 UEFA Europa League First qualifying round
Relegation to 2012–13 Nemzeti Bajnokság II

Updated to match(es) played on 20 May 2012. Source: MLSZ (in Hungarian)

== Results ==
Home \ Away	DEB	DIÓ	FTC	GYŐ	HAL	HON	KAP	KEC	PAK	PÁP	PÉC	SIÓ	UTE	VAS	VID	ZTE
Debrecen		5–0	1–0	2–0	2–0	1–1	3–0	2–1	4–2	2–2	4–0	1–1	3–2	5–2	2–1	5–2
Diósgyőr	0–2		2–3	2–0	1–0	2–1	2–1	1–2	1–2	2–0	4–0	2–1	1–0	3–2	0–2	4–1
Ferencváros	1–2	1–1		2–2	1–2	0–0	0–0	3–0 (Note: Originally Ferencváros won the game to 2–1, but it was forfeited.)	0–0	0–2	0–1	0–1	3–0	1–0	0–1	2–0
Győr	1–2	2–0	2–0		1–0	1–3	2–1	4–0	4–1	3–2	3–0	4–1	1–0	3–2	1–0	5–1
Haladás	0–1	2–1	2–1	1–1		2–4	1–1	2–2	5–0	2–1	1–1	2–1	1–1	3–0	2–2	1–0
Honvéd	0–3	2–1	1–0	1–2	2–2		0–0	1–4	2–3	2–0	1–1	3–1	2–0	4–0	1–0	2–0
Kaposvár	1–1	3–2	2–2	0–0	1–1	2–2		2–1	4–4	2–0	1–0	2–3	2–2	0–0	2–0	3–1
Kecskemét	0–1	1–0	1–0	2–0	2–2	3–1	4–0		0–1	3–0	1–2	3–2	0–0	1–1	0–2	2–0
Paks	0–0	1–1	4–2	1–2	3–2	2–1	0–0	3–2		1–1	4–4	1–1	2–0	2–1	1–2	4–2
Pápa	0–2	1–2	1–2	0–2	1–0	3–1	1–0	1–0	1–0		0–0	2–0	0–1	0–0	2–3	0–1
Pécs	0–0	1–2	0–2	3–1	1–0	3–4	1–1	2–2	1–2	2–1		1–1	0–0	5–1	1–3	2–1
Siófok	0–0	1–0	0–2	0–1	0–2	0–0	3–1	0–2	2–0	3–1	2–1		2–0	0–0	0–0	2–0
Újpest	1–5	1–1	1–1	1–3	4–1	2–0	3–1	3–1	0–2	0–1	4–1	1–1		2–0	0–2	4–2
Vasas	0–0	2–3	2–0	1–2	0–0	1–2	0–1	2–4	1–0	1–1	1–2	1–0	3–0		0–0	3–2
Videoton	0–1	2–0	2–0	2–1	1–0	1–0	2–0	0–2	4–0	2–0	4–1	7–0	3–0	4–1		4–1
ZTE	0–2	1–1	2–3	0–2	1–1	0–4	1–1	1–1	1–1	1–1	0–0	1–1	1–1	1–1	0–2	

Updated to match(es) played on 20 May 2012. Source: soccerway.com
Legend: Blue = home team win; Yellow = draw; Red = away team win.

== Top goalscorers ==
Including matches played on 27 May 2012; Source: MLSZ (Click on "Góllövő lista")

Rank	Scorer	Club	Goals
1	(France) Adamo Coulibaly	Debrecen	20
2	(Hungary) Nemanja Nikolić	Videoton	19
3	(Hungary) László Lencse	Kecskemét	15
4	(Brazil) Danilo de Oliveira	Honvéd	14
5	(Serbia) Milan Perić	Kaposvár	13
6	(Brazil) André Alves	Videoton	12
7	(Hungary) Péter Bajzát	Pécs	11
8	(Hungary) Dániel Böde	Paks	10
9	(Estonia) Jarmo Ahjupera	Győr	9
9	(Spain) José Juan Luque Jiménez	Diósgyőr	9

=== Hat-tricks ===
Player	For	Against	Result	Date
(France) Adamo Coulibaly	Debreceni VSC	Vasas SC	5-2	15 July 2011
(Hungary) Vilmos Melczer	BFC Siófok	Kaposvár	3-1	20 August 2011
(Hungary) Dániel Böde	Paksi SE	Pécsi MFC	4-4	24 September 2011
(Brazil) André Alves	Videoton FC	BFC Siófok	7-0	19 November 2011
(Bosnia and Herzegovina) Stevo Nikolić	Debreceni VSC	ZTE	5-2	26 November 2011
(Hungary) Máté Pátkai	Győri ETO FC	BFC Siófok	4-1	9 March 2012
(Hungary) László Lencse	Kecskemét	Bp. Honvéd	4-1	23 March 2012

=== Five goals in a match ===
Player	For	Against	Result	Date
(Hungary) Péter Bajzát	Pécsi MFC	Vasas SC	5-1	26 November 2011

== Attendances ==
No.	Club	Average
1	Diósgyör	7,800
2	Debrecen	7,040
3	Ferencváros	5,973
4	Haladás	5,140
5	Győr	4,660
6	Videoton	4,101
7	Újpest	3,915
8	Pécs	3,387
9	ZTE	3,038
10	Kecskemét	2,933
11	Kaposvár	2,900
12	Vasas	2,199
13	Honvéd	2,193
14	Paks	2,050
15	Siófok	2,012
16	Pápa	1,905
