= List of Pécsi MFC managers =

Pécsi MFC is a professional football club based in Pécs, Hungary.

== Managers ==
Manager	Nationality	From	To	P	W	D	L	GF	GA	Win	Honours	Notes
Iuliu Bodola	Romania	1953	1954									
István Orczifalvy	Hungary	1955	1956									
Géza Kalocsay	Hungary	1956										
Béla Volentik	Hungary	1957	1958									
Mihály Czibulka	Hungary	1958	1961									
Lipót Kállay	Hungary	1961	1963									
Sándor II. Balogh	Hungary	1963	1964									
István Orczifalvy	Hungary	1964	1966									
Gyula Teleki	Hungary	1966	1968									
Imre Kovács	Hungary	1968	1970									
Sándor Kapocsi	Hungary	1970										
Mihály Czibulka	Hungary	1970	1971									
Kálmán Preiner	Hungary	1971	1972									
Mihály Czibulka	Hungary	1973										
János Dunai	Hungary	1973	1977									
Imre Kovács	Hungary	1977										
János Szőcs	Hungary	1978	1981									
Imre Kovács	Hungary	1981	1982									
László Szarvas	Hungary	1982	1983									
Imre Kovács	Hungary	1983										
István Rónai	Hungary	1983	1985									
József Garami	Hungary	1 July 1985	1992									
Nándor Koller	Hungary	1992	1993									
Antal Róth	Hungary	1993	1994									
László Eich	Hungary											
Pál Dárdai	Hungary		1996									
Imre Herke	Hungary	1996										
József Gelei	Hungary	1996	1997									
László Kiss	Hungary	1997										
Róbert Glázer	Hungary	1997	1998									
Gábor Réfi	Hungary	1998										
Gyula Bozai	Hungary	1999	2000									
Gábor Szapor	Hungary	2000										
Árpád Toma	Hungary	2000										
Antal Róth	Hungary	2001	2002									
Tamás Nagy	Hungary	1 July 2003	24 April 2005									
Ferenc Keszei	Hungary	10 June 2005	22 May 2007									
Károly Kis	Hungary	15 June 2007	18 September 2007									
Tamás Nagy	Hungary	20 September 2007	25 Aug 2008									
Antal Róth	Hungary	26 Aug 2008	4 May 2009									
Antal Botos	Hungary	5 May 2009	2 Nov 2009									
Péter Várhidi	Hungary	18 Nov 2009	13 June 2010									
László Kiss	Hungary	15 June 2010	14 March 2011									
Ferenc Mészáros	Hungary	15 March 2011	2 April 2012									
Olivér Mink	Hungary	4 April 2012	1 June 2012									
Attila Supka	Hungary	1 July 2012	5 Jan 2013									
Emil Lőrincz and Gábor Márton	Hungary	5 Jan 2013	30 June 2013									
György Véber	Hungary	16 June 2014	November 2014									
Robert Jarni	Croatia	24 November 2014	1 June 2015	17	6	3	8	19	26			
Gábor Márton	Hungary	1 January 2015	30 June 2018									
György Sárai	Hungary	August 2018	October 2018									
László Vas	Hungary	March 2019	June 2022									
Ádám Weitner	Hungary	June 2022										
János Mátyus	Hungary	21 February 2024	29 May 2024									
Zoltán Aczél	Hungary	28 June 2024	7 May 2025									
