= List of Hungary national football team managers =

This article contains the list of the national football team managers of the "Hungarian national football team". The list only contains data for matches officially recognized by the Hungarian Football Association.

So far, the national football team has had 55 different managers, and the selection committee managed the national football team on two occasions, in a total of 8 matches. Lajos Baróti was the national football team manager in the most matches, a total of 117 times.

== Current manager and most matches ==
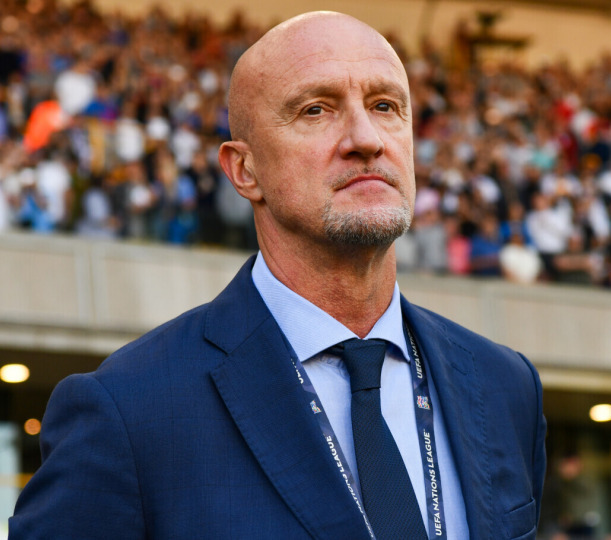
The Italian Marco Rossi, the current national football team manager

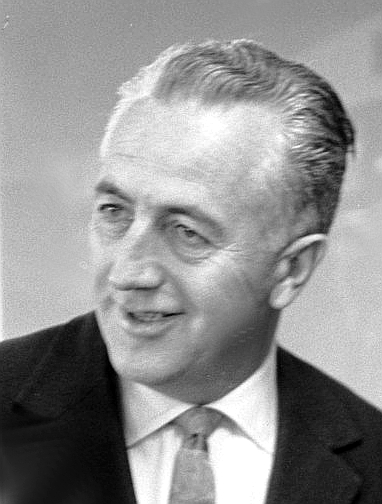
Lajos Baróti led the national football team in the most matches (117)

== National football team managers ==
- Updated as of: 17 November 2026 (Hungary–Northern Ireland, UEFA Nations League)

No.	Name	Years	Matches	Won	Drawn	Lost	Win%	Tournaments	
1.	(Hungary) Ferenc Gillemot	1902–04	5	3	0	2	60.0	None	
2.	(Hungary) Ferenc Stobbe	1904–06, 1907–08	9	3	1	5	33.3	None	
3.	(Hungary) Alfréd Hajós	1906	3	1	2	0	33.3	None	
4.	(Hungary) Frigyes Minder	1908–11, 1914–15, 1919, 1930	24	13	3	8	54.2	None	
5.	(Hungary) Ede Herczog	1911–14, 1916–17	31	19	7	5	61.3	1912 Summer Olympics	Round 2
6.	(Hungary) Ákos Fehéry	1918–19	5	5	0	0	100.0	None	
7.	(Hungary) József Harsády	1920	1	0	1	0	0.0	None	
8.	(Hungary) Lajos Tibor	1920	2	0	0	2	0.0	None	
9.	(Hungary) Gyula Kiss	1921–24, 1926–28	41	20	9	12	48.8	1924 Summer Olympics	Round 2
10.	(Hungary) Ödön Holits	1924	1	1	0	0	100.0	None	
11.	(Hungary) Lajos Máriássy	1924–26, 1930–32	31	12	8	11	38.7	None	
12.	(Hungary) Tivadar Kiss	1928	1	0	0	1	0.0	None	
13.	(Hungary) János Földessy	1928–29	6	3	2	1	50.0	None	
14.	(Hungary) Mihály Pataki	1930	3	0	2	1	0.0	None	
15.	(Hungary) Ödön Nádas	1932–34	17	7	3	7	41.2	1934 FIFA World Cup	Quarter-finals
16.	(Hungary) Károly Dietz	1934–39	41	19	9	13	46.3	1938 FIFA World Cup	Runners-up
–	(Hungary) Zoltán Opata	1936	1	0	0	1	0.0	1936 Summer Olympics	Round 1
17.	(Hungary) Dénes Ginzery	1939–41	13	6	6	1	46.2	None	
18.	(Hungary) József Fábián	1941–42	4	0	2	2	0.0	None	
19.	(Hungary) Kálmán Vághy	1942–43	6	5	0	1	83.3	None	
20.	(Hungary) Tibor Gallowich	1945–48	18	13	1	4	72.2	None	
–	Selection committee (Hungary) Gusztáv Sebes, (Hungary) Gábor Kléber, (Hungary) Béla Mandik	1948	4	3	0	1	75.0	None	
21.	(Hungary) Gusztáv Sebes	1949–56	69	50	12	7	72.5	1952 Summer Olympics	Champions
21.	(Hungary) Gusztáv Sebes	1949–56	69	50	12	7	72.5	1954 FIFA World Cup	Runners-up
22.	(Hungary) Márton Bukovi	1956–57	8	6	1	1	75.0	None	
–	Selection committee (Hungary) Lajos Baróti, (Hungary) Károly Lakat, (Hungary) Károly Sós	1957	4	3	0	1	75.0	None	
23.	(Hungary) Lajos Baróti	1957–66, 1975–78	117	62	27	28	52.9	1958 FIFA World Cup	Group stage
23.	(Hungary) Lajos Baróti	1957–66, 1975–78	117	62	27	28	52.9	1962 FIFA World Cup	Quarter-finals
23.	(Hungary) Lajos Baróti	1957–66, 1975–78	117	62	27	28	52.9	UEFA Euro 1964	Third place
23.	(Hungary) Lajos Baróti	1957–66, 1975–78	117	62	27	28	52.9	1966 FIFA World Cup	Quarter-finals
23.	(Hungary) Lajos Baróti	1957–66, 1975–78	117	62	27	28	52.9	1978 FIFA World Cup	Group stage
–	(Hungary) Béla Volentik	1960	5	4	0	1	80.0	1960 Summer Olympics	Third place
24.	(Hungary) Rudolf Illovszky	1966–67, 1971–74	39	20	10	9	51.3	UEFA Euro 1972	Fourth place
24.	(Hungary) Rudolf Illovszky	1966–67, 1971–74	39	20	10	9	51.3	1972 Summer Olympics	Runners-up
25.	(Hungary) Károly Sós	1968–69	10	5	1	4	50.0	None	
26.	(Hungary) József Hoffer	1970–71	10	4	3	3	40.0	None	
27.	(Hungary) József Bozsik	1974	1	0	0	1	0.0	None	
28.	(Hungary) Ede Moór	1974–75	6	2	2	2	33.3	None	
29.	(Hungary) János Szőcs (caretaker)	1975	1	0	0	1	0.0	None	
30.	(Hungary) Ferenc Kovács	1978–79	8	2	4	2	25.0	None	
31.	(Hungary) Károly Lakat	1979–80	6	3	0	3	50.0	1964 Summer Olympics	Champions
31.	(Hungary) Károly Lakat	1979–80	6	3	0	3	50.0	1968 Summer Olympics	Champions
32.	(Hungary) Kálmán Mészöly	1980–83, 1990–91, 1994–95	61	24	12	25	39.3	1982 FIFA World Cup	Group stage
33.	(Hungary) György Mezey	1983–86, 1988	35	20	7	8	57.1	1986 FIFA World Cup	Group stage
34.	(Hungary) Imre Komora	1986	3	0	1	2	0.0	None	
35.	(Hungary) József Verebes	1987, 1993–94	14	3	3	8	21.4	None	
36.	(Hungary) József Garami	1987	5	2	1	2	40.0	None	
37.	(Hungary) László Bálint (technical director)	1988	6	2	2	2	33.3	None	
38.	(Hungary) Bertalan Bicskei	1989, 1998–2001	45	15	19	11	33.3	None	
39.	(Hungary) Róbert Glázer (caretaker)	1991	4	0	2	2	0.0	None	
40.	(Romania) Emerich Jenei	1992–93	14	6	4	4	42.9	None	
41.	(Hungary) Ferenc Puskás	1993	4	1	0	3	25.0	None	
42.	(Hungary) János Csank	1996–97	19	6	3	10	31.6	None	
43.	(Hungary) Imre Gellei	2001–03	23	7	4	12	30.4	None	
44.	(Germany) Lothar Matthäus	2004–06	28	11	3	14	39.3	None	
45.	(Hungary) Péter Bozsik	2006	7	3	0	4	42.9	None	
46.	(Hungary) Péter Várhidi	2006–08	16	7	1	8	43.8	None	
47.	(Netherlands) Erwin Koeman	2008–10	20	7	4	9	35.0	None	
48.	(Hungary) Sándor Egervári	2010–13	34	17	8	9	50.0	None	
49.	(Hungary) József Csábi (caretaker)	2013	1	1	0	0	100.0	None	
50.	(Hungary) Attila Pintér	2013–14	5	2	1	2	40.0	None	
51.	(Hungary) Pál Dárdai	2014–15	7	4	2	1	57.1	None	
52.	(Germany) Bernd Storck	2015–17	25	8	7	10	32.0	UEFA Euro 2016	Round of 16
53.	(Hungary) Zoltán Szélesi (caretaker)	2017	2	1	0	1	50.0	None	
54.	(Belgium) Georges Leekens	2017–18	4	0	1	3	0.0	None	
55.	(Italy) Marco Rossi	2018–present	92	43	22	27	46.7	UEFA Euro 2020	Group stage
55.	(Italy) Marco Rossi	2018–present	92	43	22	27	46.7	UEFA Euro 2024	Group stage

== Sources ==
- "A Magyar Labdarúgó Válogatott szövetségi kapitányai". magyarfutball.hu.
- "A szövetségi kapitányok név szerint". magyarvalogatott.hu.
