= List of Pécsi MFC seasons =

Pécsi Mecsek Football Club is a professional Hungarian football club based in Pécs, Hungary.

== Key ==
Nemzeti Bajnokság I

- Pld = Matches played
- W = Matches won
- D = Matches drawn
- L = Matches lost
- GF = Goals for
- GA = Goals against
- Pts = Points
- Pos = Final position

Hungarian football league system

- NBI = Nemzeti Bajnokság I
- NBII = Nemzeti Bajnokság II
- NBIII = Nemzeti Bajnokság III
- MBI = Megyei Bajnokság I

Magyar Kupa

- F = Final
- SF = Semi-finals
- QF = Quarter-finals
- R16 = Round of 16
- R32 = Round of 32
- R64 = Round of 64
- R128 = Round of 128

UEFA

- F = Final
- SF = Semi-finals
- QF = Quarter-finals
- Group = Group stage
- PO = Play-offs
- QR3 = Third qualifying round
- QR2 = Second qualifying round
- QR1 = First qualifying round
- PR = Preliminary round

Winners	Runners-up	Third	Promoted	Relegated

== Seasons ==
Season	League									Cup	International		Manager	Ref.
Season	Div	MP	W	D	L	GF	GA	Pts.	Pos.	Cup	Competition	Result	Manager	Ref.
1970–71	NBI	30	8	12	10	28	34	33	11th		Did not qualify			
1971–72	NBI	30	6	13	11	22	28	25	11th		Did not qualify			
1972–73	NBI	30	7	11	12	27	41	25	12th		Did not qualify			
1973–74	NBI	30	12	10	8	29	26	34	7th		Did not qualify			
1974–75	NBI ↓	28	6	8	14	26	40	20	15th		Did not qualify			
1977–78	NBI	34	10	8	16	42	48	28	13th		Did not qualify			
1978–79	NBI	34	10	15	9	38	42	35	8th		Did not qualify			
1979–80	NBI	34	13	10	11	57	40	36	7th		Did not qualify			
1980–81	NBI	34	9	13	12	43	43	31	10th		Did not qualify			
1981–82	NBI	34	15	5	14	51	45	35	8th		Did not qualify			
1982–83	NBI	30	9	7	14	45	52	25	14th		Did not qualify			
1983–84	NBI	30	8	12	10	36	38	28	10th		Did not qualify			
1984–85	NBI	30	9	10	11	33	35	28	11th		Did not qualify			
1985–86	NBI	30	15	9	6	48	26	39	2nd		Did not qualify			
1986–87	NBI	30	12	7	11	30	25	31	7th	R	Did not qualify			
1987–88	NBI	30	11	9	10	31	34	31	8th		Did not qualify			
1988–89	NBI	30	9	10	11	35	37	40	11th		Did not qualify			
1989–90	NBI	30	13	9	8	37	23	48	4th	W	Did not qualify			
1990–91	NBI	30	15	7	8	32	20	37	3rd		Cup Winners' Cup	1R		
1991–92	NBI	30	10	9	11	27	34	29	9th		UEFA Cup	1R		
1992–93	NBI	30	10	7	13	35	39	27	11th		Did not qualify			
1993–94	NBI	30	7	10	13	23	39	24	11th		Did not qualify			
1994–95	NBI	30	12	6	12	38	43	42	7th		Did not qualify			
1995–96	NBI	30	7	5	18	32	53	23	16th ^{1}		Did not qualify			
1996–97	NBI	34	6	8	20	31	68	26	17th		Did not qualify			
1999-00	NBI	32	11	12	9	41	47	45	7th		Did not qualify			
2000–01	NBI	14	2	3	9	13	24	9	15th		Did not qualify			
2003–04	NBI	32	9	13	10	36	37	40	7th		Did not qualify			
2004–05	NBI	30	9	9	12	33	35	36	10th		Did not qualify			
2005–06	NBI	30	8	9	13	37	41	33	12th		Did not qualify			
2006–07	NBI	30	7	12	11	31	41	33	15th		Did not qualify			
2011–12	NBI	30	8	10	12	36	50	34	12th	R16	Did not qualify		(Hungary) Mészáros, (Hungary) Mink	
2012–13	NBI	30	10	7	13	33	44	37	12th	R16	Did not qualify		(Hungary) Mink, (Hungary) Supka, (Hungary) Márton	
2013–14	NBI	30	12	9	9	41	38	45	7th	R16	Did not qualify		(Hungary) Márton	
2014–15	NBI ↓	30	8	7	15	32	51	31	11th		Did not qualify		(Hungary) Véber, (Croatia) Jarni	
2015-16	MBI ↑	30	28	1	1	143	9	85	1st		Did not qualify			
2016–17	NBIII	34	24	4	6	92	22	76	2nd		Did not qualify			
2017–18	NBIII	30	21	5	4	75	23	68	2nd		Did not qualify			
2018–19	NBIII	30	9	11	10	32	34	38	11th		Did not qualify			
2019–20	NBIII ↑	19	15	3	1	65	9	48	1st		Did not qualify			
2020–21	NBII	38	17	13	8	51	33	64	4th		Did not qualify			
2021–22	NBII	38	12	12	14	38	39	48	11th		Did not qualify			
2022–23	NBII	38	14	16	8	38	31	58	7th		Did not qualify			
2023–24	NBII ↓	38	8	12	14	20	39	36	15th		Did not qualify		(Hungary) Mátyus	

Notes

- Note 1: Relegation play-off: Tiszakécske FC 0–0 Pécs, Pécs 0–0 Tiszakécske FC 0–0 (5–3p. )
