= 2010–11 Nemzeti Bajnokság I =

Nemzeti Bajnokság I
- Season: 2010–11
- Dates: 30 July 2010 – 22 May 2011
- Champions: Videoton (1st title)
- Relegated: MTK; Szolnok
- Champions League: Videoton
- Europa League: Paks; Ferencváros; Kecskemét (via Cup)
- Matches: 240
- Goals: 690 (2.88 per match)
- Top goalscorer: Andre Alves (24)
- Biggest home win: Újpest 6–0 Ferencváros
- Biggest away win: Pápa 0–5 Ferencváros; Ferencváros 0-5 Videoton
- Highest scoring: Debrecen 6–2 Kecskemét; ZTE 3–5 Kaposvár; Ferencváros 4–4 ZTE
- Longest winning run: Videoton (6 games)
- Longest unbeaten run: Videoton (10 games)
- Longest winless run: Haladás (10 games)
- Longest losing run: Szolnok (6 games)

The 2010–11 Nemzeti Bajnokság I, also known as NB I, was the 109th season of top-tier football in Hungary. The league is officially named Monicomp Liga for sponsorship reasons. The season began on 30 July 2010 and ended on 27 May 2011. Debrecen are the defending champions having won their fifth Hungarian championship and second in a row last season.

== Overview ==
Videoton won their first ever national championship under headcoach György Mezey.

The season saw a title-race between two western hungarian teams, Videoton and Paks, both vying for their first ever national title. Videoton were 9 points ahead of Paks by Matchday 10, and were comfortably leading the table by the winter break. Videoton went on to win 8 of their remaining 15 games, and confirmed their status as champions on May 11th, after defeating Kaposvár 3-1. The Western Hungarian side's only home defeat was against Kispest in October.

Paks was one of only four teams who managed to defeat champions Videoton throughout the season, and won 7 of their last 10 fixtures, but Károly Kis' men's performance was still only enough for a silver-medal, 5 points below their counterparts from Fehérvár. This was Paks' highest ever finish in the league up to that point.

== Teams ==
Nyíregyháza and Diósgyőr finished the 2009–10 season in the last two places and thus were relegated to their respective NB II divisions. Nyíregyháza ended a three-year stint in Hungary's highest football league while Diósgyőr were relegated after six years.

Promotion to the league was achieved by the champions of the 2009–10 NB II Eastern Division, Szolnok and by the champions of the Western Division, Siófok. Siófok return to the top league after a one-year absence while Szolnok return to the league for the first time since 1948, ending a 62-year absence.

=== Stadia and locations ===
Location of teams in 2010–11 Nemzeti Bajnokság I

Club	Short name	City	Stadium	Capacity
Debreceni VSC	Debrecen	Debrecen	Stadion Oláh Gábor Út	9,640
Ferencvárosi TC	Ferencváros	Budapest	Stadion Albert Flórián	18,100
Győri ETO FC	Győr	Győr	ETO Park	16,000
Szombathelyi Haladás	Haladás	Szombathely	Rohonci út	12,000
Budapest Honvéd FC	Honvéd	Budapest	Bozsik József Stadion	10,000
Kaposvári Rákóczi FC	Kaposvár	Kaposvár	Stadion Rákóczi	7,000
Kecskeméti TE	Kecskemét	Kecskemét	Széktói Stadion	6,300
MTK Budapest FC	MTK	Budapest	Hidegkuti Nándor Stadium	7,700
Paksi SE	Paks	Paks	Stadion PSE	4,950
Lombard-Pápa TFC	Pápa	Pápa	Stadion Várkerti	4,500
BFC Siófok	Siófok	Siófok	Bányász Stadion	10,500
Szolnoki MÁV FC	Szolnok	Szolnok	Tiszaligeti Stadion	10,000
Újpest FC	Újpest	Budapest	Szusza Ferenc Stadium	13,501
Vasas SC	Vasas	Budapest	Stadion Rudolf Illovszky	12,000
Videoton FC	Videoton	Székesfehérvár	Stadion Sóstói	15,000
Zalaegerszegi TE	ZTE	Zalaegerszeg	ZTE Arena	9,000

=== Personnel and sponsoring ===
Team	Chairman	Head Coach	Kitmaker	Shirt sponsor
Debrecen	(Hungary) Sándor Szilágyi	(Hungary) Elemér Kondás	adidas	Teva
Ferencváros	(England) Kevin McCabe	(Hungary) László Prukner	Nike	Fantastic League
Győr	(Hungary) Csaba Tarsoly	(Hungary) Aurél Csertői	Puma	Quaestor
Haladás	(Hungary) Béla Illés	(Hungary) Zoltán Aczél	Legea	Contact Zrt.
Honvéd	(United States) George F. Hemingway	(Hungary) Attila Supka	Nike	none
Kaposvár	(Hungary) Kálmán Torma	(Hungary) Tibor Sisa	Givova	Regale Klíma
Kecskemét	(Hungary) Pál Rózsa, János Versegi	(Serbia) Tomislav Sivić	Jako	Bertrans; Ereco
MTK	(Hungary) László Domonyai	(Hungary) József Garami	Nike	Duna Takarék
Paks	(Hungary) János Süli	(Hungary) Károly Kis	Jako	MvM Paksi Atomerőmű
Pápa	(Hungary) Péter Bíró	(Hungary) György Véber	Jako	Lombard
Siófok	(Hungary) ifj. György Gruber	(Hungary) István Mihalecz	Puma	AVE
Szolnok	(Hungary) Gábor Ferencz	(Hungary) Antal Simon	Hummel	AC-DC Logisztikai Park
Újpest	(Hungary) István Csehi	(Hungary) Géza Mészöly	Puma	Birdland Golf & SPA Resort
Vasas	(Hungary) Vancsa Miklós	(Hungary) András Komjáti	Lancast	none
Videoton	(Hungary) Sándor Berzi	(Hungary) György Mezey	Nike	Máltai Szeretetszolgálat
ZTE	(Hungary) Ferenc Nagy	(Hungary) János Csank	mass	St. Graal

=== Managerial changes ===
Team	Outgoing manager	Manner of departure	Date of vacancy	Replaced by	Date of appointment
Ferencváros	(England) Craig Short	Contract expired	Summer 2010	(Hungary) László Prukner	4 June 2010
Kaposvár	(Hungary) László Prukner	Resigned	2 June 2010	(Hungary) Tibor Sisa	12 June 2010
Siófok	(Hungary) Károly Horváth	Missing Pro Licence	Summer 2010	(Hungary) István Mihalecz	13 July 2010
Haladás	(Hungary) Antal Róth	Mutual agreement	23 July 2010	(Hungary) Aurél Csertői	23 July 2010
Kecskemét	(Hungary) István Urbányi	Mutual agreement	27 September 2010	(Serbia) Tomislav Sivić	14 October 2010
Szolnok	(Hungary) Attila Vágó	Mutual agreement	4 October 2010	(Hungary) Antal Simon	18 October 2010
Vasas	(Italy) Giovanni Dellacasa	Mutual agreement	6 October 2010	(Hungary) András Komjáti	7 October 2010
Haladás	(Hungary) Aurél Csertői	Sacked	16 October 2010	(Hungary) Zoltán Aczél	17 October 2010
Honvéd	(Italy) Massimo Morales	Resigned	13 November 2010	(Hungary) Attila Supka	1 January 2011
Debrecen	(Hungary) András Herczeg	Contract expired	20 December 2010	(Czech Republic) Zdeněk Ščasný	30 December 2010
Győr	(Hungary) Attila Pintér	Mutual agreement	6 March 2011	(Hungary) Aurél Csertői	7 March 2011
Debrecen	(Czech Republic) Zdeněk Ščasný	Resigned	16 April 2011	(Hungary) Elemér Kondás	20 April 2011

== League table ==
Pos	Team	Pld	W	D	L	GF	GA	GD	Pts	Qualification or relegation
1	Videoton (C)	30	18	7	5	59	29	+30	61	Qualification for Champions League second qualifying round
2	Paks	30	17	5	8	54	37	+17	56	Qualification for Europa League first qualifying round
3	Ferencváros	30	15	5	10	50	43	+7	50	Qualification for Europa League first qualifying round
4	ZTE	30	14	6	10	51	47	+4	48	
5	Debrecen	30	12	10	8	53	43	+10	46	
6	Újpest	30	13	6	11	50	38	+12	45	
7	Kaposvár	30	13	4	13	41	42	−1	43	
8	Haladás	30	11	8	11	42	36	+6	41	
9	Győr	30	10	11	9	40	35	+5	41	
10	Honvéd	30	11	7	12	36	39	−3	40	
11	Vasas	30	11	7	12	34	46	−12	40	
12	Kecskemét	30	11	3	16	51	56	−5	36	Qualification for Europa League second qualifying round (Note: Kecskemét have qualified for the second qualifying round of the 2011–12 UEFA Europa League after winning the 2010–11 Hungarian Cup.)
13	Pápa	30	10	5	15	39	52	−13	35	
14	Siófok	30	8	10	12	29	41	−12	34	
15	MTK (R)	30	8	6	16	35	49	−14	30	Relegation to Nemzeti Bajnokság II
16	Szolnok (R)	30	5	6	19	26	56	−30	21	Relegation to Nemzeti Bajnokság II

Source: soccerway.com
Rules for classification: 1st points; 2nd overall wins; 3rd goal difference; 4th goals scored
(C) Champions; (R) Relegated

=== Positions by round ===
Team ╲ Round	1	2	3	4	5	6	7	8	9	10	11	12	13	14	15	16	17	18	19	20	21	22	23	24	25	26	27	28	29	30
Videoton	6	3	2	1	7	3	1	1	1	1	1	1	1	1	1	1	1	1	1	1	1	1	1	1	1	1	1	1	1	1
Paks	13	11	14	15	10	9	6	3	6	9	6	5	6	5	6	6	6	3	6	3	3	3	2	3	2	2	2	2	2	2
Ferencváros	5	2	5	5	3	7	9	6	4	3	4	3	5	4	3	4	2	2	2	2	2	2	4	2	4	4	3	3	3	3
ZTE	14	13	9	9	8	10	11	10	7	4	2	2	2	3	2	2	4	5	3	4	4	5	5	5	5	6	5	5	5	4
Debrecen	3	4	1	2	1	5	5	9	5	7	5	4	3	2	4	5	3	4	5	6	6	6	6	6	6	5	6	4	4	5
Újpest	11	6	8	8	9	8	10	7	9	6	9	10	10	9	9	11	9	9	11	10	11	11	13	12	10	8	9	7	7	6
Kaposvár	1	7	3	3	2	1	3	2	2	2	3	6	8	6	5	3	5	6	4	5	5	4	3	4	3	3	4	6	6	7
Haladás	8	9	13	16	16	16	16	16	16	16	16	16	15	15	15	15	14	14	12	13	12	13	11	13	13	13	13	10	9	8
Győr	10	5	10	11	12	11	7	8	11	13	13	11	11	11	12	10	8	10	10	9	9	8	8	8	12	12	11	9	10	9
Honvéd	12	15	11	7	6	2	4	5	3	5	7	7	7	8	8	8	10	11	13	12	13	12	10	7	11	9	8	11	11	10
Vasas	4	8	6	6	4	6	8	12	13	11	11	9	9	12	14	13	13	13	9	11	8	9	7	9	7	7	7	8	8	11
Kecskemét	15	16	16	13	14	12	14	14	14	14	14	14	14	13	11	9	12	8	8	8	10	10	12	11	9	10	10	12	12	12^{A}
Pápa	16	14	15	12	13	14	12	11	12	10	8	8	4	7	7	7	7	7	7	7	7	7	9	10	8	11	12	13	13	13
Siófok	7	12	12	14	15	15	13	13	10	12	12	13	13	14	13	14	15	15	15	15	15	15	14	14	14	14	14	14	14	14
MTK	2	1	4	4	5	4	2	4	8	8	10	12	12	10	10	12	11	12	14	14	14	14	15	15	15	15	15	15	15	15
Szolnok	9	10	7	10	11	13	15	15	15	15	15	15	16	16	16	16	16	16	16	16	16	16	16	16	16	16	16	16	16	16

Leader
2011–12 UEFA Europa League First qualifying round
Relegation to 2011–12 Nemzeti Bajnokság II
2011–12 UEFA Europa League Second qualifying round

Updated to match(es) played on 22 May 2011. Source: MLSZ (in Hungarian)
Notes: ^{A} Kecskemét have qualified for the second qualifying round of the 2011–12 UEFA Europa League after winning the 2010–11 Hungarian Cup on 17 May 2011 between the 29th and 30th round.

== Results ==
Home \ Away	DEB	FTC	GYŐ	HAL	HON	KAP	KEC	MTK	PAK	PÁP	SIÓ	SZL	UTE	VAS	VID	ZTE
Debrecen		2–1	1–1	1–2	2–2	3–1	6–2	3–1	2–1	2–0	2–3	4–0	1–1	3–1	3–1	2–1
Ferencváros	1–1		3–0	2–1	1–3	1–0	2–1	3–0	2–1	3–0	1–2	1–0	1–0	0–1	0–5	4–4
Győr	3–0	1–0		2–2	3–0	2–0	2–1	1–1	1–1	0–1	1–0	4–2	2–1	0–1	1–1	0–1
Haladás	3–0	1–1	3–3		1–1	2–0	1–0	2–0	1–2	1–0	4–0	3–1	0–2	3–0	2–0	0–0
Honvéd	1–0	0–1	1–1	3–1		1–0	1–2	1–2	1–0	2–4	0–1	0–0	1–4	0–0	2–2	1–0
Kaposvár	0–0	2–1	3–0	1–0	0–0		2–1	2–1	1–2	3–2	3–0	0–1	0–1	0–1	1–4	2–1
Kecskemét	3–0	1–2	3–3	1–0	2–1	4–1		3–0	0–1	0–1	2–3	4–2	4–3	3–1	2–4	1–0
MTK	0–0	1–3	0–0	0–3	3–1	0–2	4–2		3–4	2–1	1–2	1–0	1–0	4–0	0–3	3–4
Paks	2–2	3–2	2–1	2–1	0–1	2–3	2–0	1–1		4–0	0–0	3–1	2–1	3–0	1–0	2–2
Pápa	1–1	0–5	2–1	5–1	0–1	1–1	4–1	0–2	1–2		0–1	0–0	3–1	2–1	1–2	4–3
Siófok	4–1	1–1	0–1	0–0	1–3	0–0	1–2	0–0	1–3	0–1		1–1	1–1	0–0	1–1	0–4
Szolnok	1–2	2–3	0–3	0–0	0–2	1–2	2–1	2–1	3–1	2–2	0–4		1–0	0–1	1–1	1–3
Újpest	2–2	6–0	0–0	3–1	3–1	3–2	2–1	2–1	2–3	2–1	1–1	1–0		2–2	1–0	4–2
Vasas	1–5	1–3	2–1	2–1	3–2	1–3	1–1	1–1	2–3	1–1	3–0	3–0	1–0		0–0	2–0
Videoton	2–1	1–1	2–1	3–1	0–2	3–1	2–2	2–1	2–1	4–0	2–0	3–1	1–0	3–0		3–0
ZTE	1–1	2–1	1–1	1–1	2–1	3–5	2–1	1–0	1–0	3–1	2–1	2–1	2–1	2–1	1–2	

Source: soccerway.com
Legend: Blue = home team win; Yellow = draw; Red = away team win.

== Top goalscorers ==
Including matches played on 22 May 2011; Source: MLSZ (Click on "Góllövő lista")

Rank	Scorer	Club	Goals
1	(Brazil) Andre Alves	Videoton	24
2	(Malta) André Schembri	Ferencváros	16
3	(Hungary) Dániel Böde	Paks	15
4	(France) Adamo Coulibaly	Debrecen	14
5	(Hungary) Lóránt Oláh	Kaposvár	13
5	(Hungary) Attila Tököli	Kecskemét	13
7	(Hungary) Patrik Tischler	MTK	12
8	(Hungary) Krisztián Kenesei	Haladás	11
8	(Hungary) István Ferenczi	Vasas	11
8	(Serbia) Goran Marić	Pápa	11

== Attendances ==
#	Club	Average
1	Ferencváros	5,773
2	Debrecen	4,220
3	Videoton	4,155
4	Újpest	3,962
5	Szombathelyi Haladás	3,713
6	Zalaegerszeg	3,063
7	Kecskemét	2,847
8	Győr	2,580
9	Kaposvár	2,220
10	Lombard Pápa	2,040
11	Budapest Honvéd	1,793
12	Szolnok	1,720
13	Siófok	1,717
14	Vasas	1,667
15	Paks	1,660
16	MTK	1,073

== See also ==
- List of Hungarian football transfer summer 2010
