= 2018–19 Nemzeti Bajnokság II =

Nemzeti Bajnokság II
- Season: 2018–19
- Champions: Zalaegerszeg
- Promoted: Zalaegerszeg; Kaposvár
- Relegated: Cegléd; Mosonmagyaróvár; Monor
- Top goalscorer: Ádám Balajti (32)
- All statistics correct as of 19 August 2018.

The 2018–19 Nemzeti Bajnokság II (also known as 2018–19 Merkantil Bank Liga) was Hungary's 68th season of the Nemzeti Bajnokság II, the second tier of the Hungarian football league system.

== Team changes ==
Promoted from 2017–18 Nemzeti Bajnokság III	Relegated from 2017–18 Nemzeti Bajnokság I
Kaposvár (West)	Vasas
Tiszakécske (Center)	Balmazújváros
Monor (East)	
Promoted to 2018–19 Nemzeti Bajnokság I	Relegated to 2018–19 Nemzeti Bajnokság III
MTK Budapest	Szolnok
Kisvárda	Szeged
	Sopron

== Stadiums by capacity ==
Team	Location	Stadium	Capacity
Balmazújváros	Balmazújváros	Városi Sportpálya	2,435
Békéscsaba	Békéscsaba	Kórház utcai	4,963
Budafok	Budapest, Budafok	Promontor utcai	4,000
Budaörs	Budaörs	Árok utcai	1,204
Cegléd	Cegléd	Malomtó széli	4,000
Aqvital	Csákvár	Tersztyánszky Ödön	2,500
Dorog	Dorog	Buzánszky Jenő	12,000
Gyirmót	Győr	Ménfői úti	4,500
Győr	Győr	ETO Park	16,000
Kaposvár	Kaposvár	Kaposvár Rákóczi	7,000
Kazincbarcika	Kazincbarcika	Pete András	8,000
Monor	Monor	Balassi Bálint utcai	2,250
Mosonmagyaróvár	Mosonmagyaróvár	Wittmann Antal park	4,000
Nyíregyháza Spartacus	Nyíregyháza	Városi	10,500
Siófok	Siófok	Révész Géza utcai	6,500
Soroksár	Budapest, Soroksár	Szamosi Mihály	5,000
Tiszakécske	Tiszakécske	Városi Stadion	4,500
Vác	Vác	Ligeti	9,000
Vasas	Budapest	Illovszky Rudolf	5,054
Zalaegerszeg	Zalaegerszeg	ZTE Arena	8,990

== Stadiums by locations ==
Location of teams in 2018–19 Nemzeti Bajnokság II
Location of Budapest teams.

== Personnel and kits ==
Team	Manager	Captain	Kit manufacturer	Shirt sponsor
Balmazújváros	(Croatia) Toni Golem	(Hungary) Gergő Szécsi	Adidas	Kamilla Gyógyfürdő
Békéscsaba	(Hungary) Gábor Boér	(Hungary)	Saller	Békés Drén
Budafok	(Hungary) Csaba Csizmadia	(Hungary)	Mitre	Care Park
Budaörs	(Hungary) György Bognár	(Hungary) Ádám Csobánki	Ziccer	Volkswagen
Cegléd	(Hungary) Tibor Nagy	(Hungary)	Joma	Balogh Tészta
Csákvár	(Hungary) István Szíjjártó	(Hungary)	2Rule	Euroaszfalt
Dorog	(Hungary) Pál Balogh	(Hungary) Illés Sitku	Adidas	Pannon Falap-Lemez
Gyirmót	(Hungary) László Szepessy	(Hungary)	Jako	Alcufer
Győr	(Hungary) József Király	(Hungary)	Adidas	WKW
Kaposvár	(Hungary) Róbert Waltner	(Hungary)	Nike	Szuperagro
Kazincbarcika	(Hungary) György Gálhidi	(Hungary)	Adidas	KolorCity
Monor	(Hungary) Dávid Horváth	(Hungary)	Joma	
Mosonmagyaróvár	(Hungary) András Tóth	(Hungary) Balázs Laki	Jako	Credobus
Nyíregyháza	(Serbia) Zoran Spisljak	(Hungary) -	Jako	Révész
Siófok	(Hungary) István Mihalecz	(Hungary) -	Nike	HunGast
Soroksár	(Hungary) Péter Lipcsei	(Hungary)	Nike	
Tiszakécske	(Hungary) István Szabó	(Hungary)	2Rule	Duna Aszfalt
Vác	(Hungary) Károly Horváth	(Hungary) Csaba Hegedűs	Nike	Sláger FM
Vasas	(Hungary) Károly Szanyó	(Hungary)	Adidas	Alprosys
Zalaegerszeg	(Hungary) Barna Dobos	(Hungary) -	Puma	Pharos

== Managerial changes ==
Team	Outgoing manager	Manner of departure	Date of vacancy	Position is table	Replaced by	Date of appointment
Zalaegerszeg	(Hungary) Tamás Artner	Mutual agreement	4 June 2018	pre-season	(Hungary) Tamás Nagy	20 June 2018
Dorog	(Hungary) Szabolcs Schindler	End of contract	12 June 2018	pre-season	(Hungary) Attila Miskei	18 June 2018
Győri ETO	(Hungary) Lázár Szentes		21 June 2018	pre-season	(Hungary) Géza Mészöly	22 June 2018
Vasas	(Germany) Michael Oenning	End of contract	30 June 2018	pre-season	(Hungary) Károly Kis	27 June 2018
Vác	(Hungary) Tibor Nagy	End of contract	30 June 2018	pre-season	(Serbia) Zoran Spišljak	12 June 2018
Budafok	(Hungary) Bálint Tóth	End of contract	6 June 2018	pre-season	(Hungary) Zoltán Vitelki	19 June 2018
Mosonmagyaróvár	(Hungary) Péter Várhidi	Mutual agreement	10 October 2018	18th	(Hungary) András Tóth	

== League table ==
Pos	Team	Pld	W	D	L	GF	GA	GD	Pts	Promotion or relegation
1	Zalaegerszeg (C, P)	38	25	7	6	77	41	+36	82	Promotion to Nemzeti Bajnokság I
2	Kaposvár (P)	38	21	11	6	62	41	+21	74	Promotion to Nemzeti Bajnokság I
3	Gyirmót	38	20	5	13	75	50	+25	65	
4	Vasas	38	18	11	9	73	64	+9	65	
5	Budaörs	38	20	4	14	65	46	+19	64	
6	Békéscsaba	38	17	9	12	56	49	+7	60	
7	Soroksár	38	18	5	15	68	61	+7	59	
8	Győr	38	17	7	14	60	46	+14	58	
9	Kazincbarcika	38	16	8	14	59	50	+9	56	
10	Nyíregyháza	38	15	11	12	53	49	+4	56	
11	Aqvital Csákvár	38	12	16	10	57	59	−2	52	
12	Siófok	38	12	11	15	49	53	−4	47	
13	Vác	38	11	13	14	44	51	−7	46	
14	Dorog	38	10	13	15	54	59	−5	43	
15	Tiszakécske	38	9	16	13	34	52	−18	43	
16	Budafok	38	12	5	21	46	66	−20	41	
17	Balmazújváros	38	10	10	18	33	48	−15	40	
18	Cegléd (R)	38	8	8	22	35	68	−33	32	Relegation to Nemzeti Bajnokság III
19	Mosonmagyaróvár (R)	38	6	13	19	35	61	−26	31	Relegation to Nemzeti Bajnokság III
20	Monor (R)	38	7	9	22	49	70	−21	30	Relegation to Nemzeti Bajnokság III

Source: Soccerway
Rules for classification: 1st points; 2nd overall wins; 3rd goal difference; 4th head-to-head points; 5th head-to-head goal difference; 6th head-to-head away goals scored; 7th fair-play points; 8th drawing of lots
(C) Champions; (P) Promoted; (R) Relegated

== See also ==
- 2018–19 Magyar Kupa
- 2018–19 Nemzeti Bajnokság I
- 2018–19 Nemzeti Bajnokság III
- 2018–19 Megyei Bajnokság I
