= István Mihalecz (footballer, born 1947) =

Hungarian football player and manager (1947–2026)

Personal information
- Date of birth: 17 June 1947
- Place of birth: Zalaegerszeg, Hungary
- Date of death: 7 June 2026 (aged 78)
- Place of death: Zalaegerszeg, Hungary
- Position: Midfielder

Senior career*
Years	Team	Apps	(Gls)
1972–1983	Zalaegerszeg	280	(46)

Managerial career
- 1991-1993: Zalaegerszegi TE
- 1994-1995: Paksi FC
- 1995–1998: Szombathelyi Haladás
- 2000: Nagykanizsa FC
- 2003: Zalaegerszegi TE
- 2004–2005: Szombathelyi Haladás
- * Club domestic league appearances and goals

István Mihalecz (16 June 1947 – 7 June 2026) was a Hungarian football manager and a player. His son is also a football manager, named István Mihalecz.

== Career ==
On 1 September 2003, Mihalecz was appointed the manager of Nemzeti Bajnokság I club Zalaegerszegi TE.

In the 2004–05 Nemzeti Bajnokság II, Haladás finished in the 13th position. However, they were not relegated thanks to changes in the number of teams participating in the Nemzeti Bajnokság II.

On 24 June 2005, he resigned as a manager of Szombathelyi Haladás.

== Death ==
Mihalecz died on 7 June 2026, at the age of 78.
