= János Szőcs =

Hungarian footballer (born 1933)

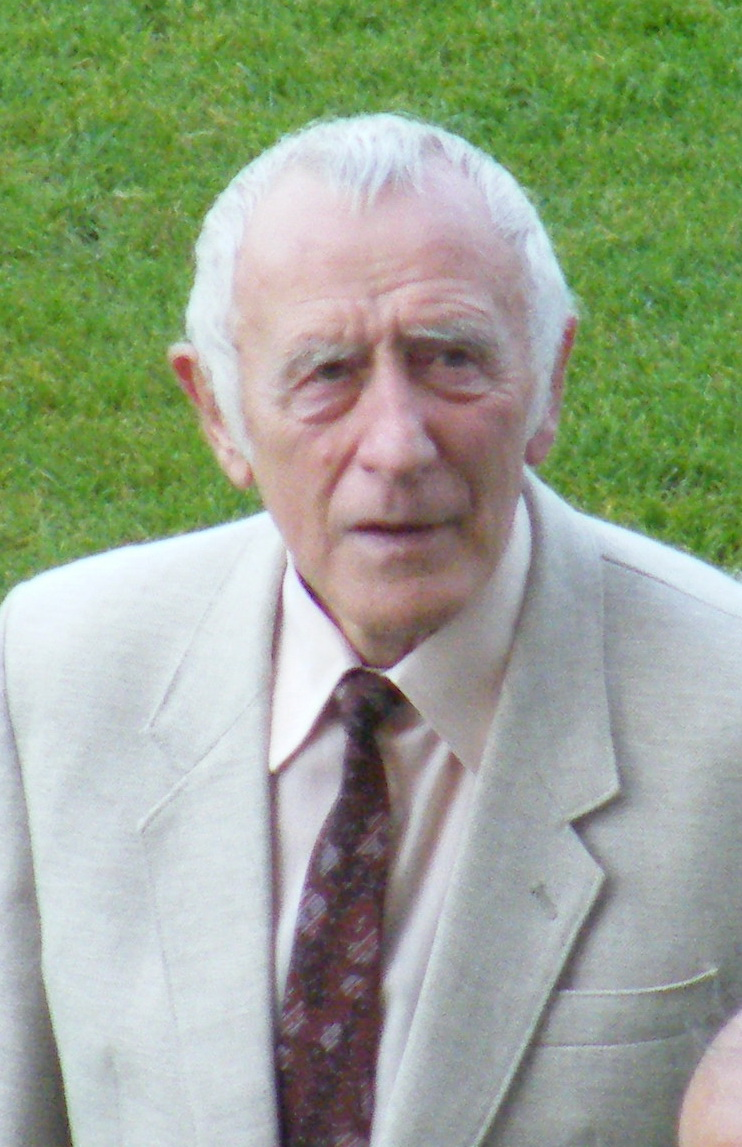
- Szőcs In 2009

Personal information
- Date of birth: 18 February 1933 (age 93)
- Place of birth: Ikervár, Hungary
- Position: Right-back

Youth career
- Years: Team
- 1949–1956: Zalaegerszegi Zrinyi SE
?–1955	Pécsi VM		
1955–1957	Pécsi Dózsa		
1958–1962	Budapest Honvéd	56	(2)
1962–1965	Komlói Bányász	55	(4)

Managerial career
- 1965–1967: Komlói Bányász
- 1968–1978: Zalaegerszeg
- 1975: Hungary
- 1978–1981: Pécsi MSC
- 1981–1982: Zalaegerszeg
- 1983–1985: Nagykanizsa
- 1985–1987: Keszthelyi Haladás
- 1996: Zalaegerszeg

János Szőcs (born 18 February 1933) is a Hungarian former football player and coach. He played as a right-back and later managed several Hungarian teams. In 1975, he was the acting head coach of the Hungary national team for one match.

== Playing career ==
Szőcs was born Ikervár. He began his football career at Zrínyi SE, although he also excelled in other sports. In 1948–49, he participated in the national high school basketball championship final four as a student from Zalaegerszeg.

After graduating from high school in 1951, he played for Zalai Építők, and then for Vörös Meteor, the Nemzeti Bajnokság II predecessor of ZTE. Between 1952 and 1953, he played there before moving to Pécsi EAC, a regional-level team, while studying in the teacher training college in Pécs. When Pécs gained top-tier rights in 1955, he joined Pécsi Dózsa and became one of the team's key players until 1958.

His performance drew the attention of Budapest Honvéd, who signed him in 1958. He played with them until 1962. By then, most members of the "Golden Team" had already transferred abroad, but Bozsik, Budai, Kotász, and Szőcs remained. One of the highlights of this era was winning the 1959 Mitropa Cup.

== Coaching career ==
While at Honvéd, Szőcs earned the highest coaching qualification available at the time. In 1962, he joined the NB I team Komlói Bányász as a player, staying until 1965. He then became their head coach (1965–1967).

In 1968, he joined Zalaegerszegi TE as both a PE teacher and city sports inspector, with the additional responsibility of coaching the football team. He accepted the role at half his previous salary due to his commitment to Zala football. He led the club to great success during his decade-long tenure.

Under his leadership, ZTE reached NB I in 3.5 years. In 1975, he managed the Hungary national team for one match – a European Championship qualifier against Wales on 16 April. He later coached Pécsi MSC (1978–1981), returned to ZTE (1981–1982), then managed Nagykanizsai Olajbányász SE, Keszthelyi Haladás, and had a brief final stint at ZTE in 1996.

== Honours ==
Budapest Honvéd

- Hungarian First Division (as player)
  - Third place: 1958–59

Zalaegerszeg

- Lifetime Achievement Award, ZTE Blue-White Gala (2002)
- Pro Urbe Zalaegerszeg award (2003) for outstanding contribution to the city's sports life
- MLSZ Gold Medal of Merit (2009), awarded by UEFA and FIFA leaders for his dedication to Hungarian football

== Sources ==
- Ki kicsoda a magyar sportéletben?: III. kötet (S–Z). Szekszárd: Babits. 1995. 171. o. ISBN 963-495-014-0
- Tősér Norbert: Szőcs János, a Zala megyei futball-legenda; ZTE FC, Zalaegerszeg, 2021
