= Filipe Çelikkaya =

Portuguese football manager (born 1985)

Personal information
- Full name: Filipe Engin Neves Çelikkaya
- Date of birth: 19 January 1985 (age 41)
- Place of birth: Lisbon, Portugal
- Height: 1.76 m (5 ft 9 in)
- Position: Midfielder

Team information
- Current team: Zalaegerszeg (manager)

Youth career
- 1995–1999: Cova Piedade
- 1999–2004: Belenenses

College career
Years	Team	Apps	(Gls)
2008	Sacred Heart Pioneers		

Senior career*
Years	Team	Apps	(Gls)
2004–2005	Fazendense		
2005–2006	Atlético Cacém		
2006–2007	Oeiras		
2008	Sintrense		

Managerial career
- 2009–2010: Almada U17
- 2010–2012: Benfica U15
- 2014–2015: Almada
- 2020–2024: Sporting CP B
- 2026–: Zalaegerszeg
- * Club domestic league appearances and goals

Filipe Engin Neves Çelikkaya (born 19 January 1985) is a Portuguese football manager. He is the current manager of Hungarian club Zalaegerszegi TE. He spent four years as manager of Sporting CP B, while Ruben Amorim was manager of the first team.

== Early life and playing career ==
Çelikkaya was born in Lisbon. His father, from Eskişehir, Turkey, was on a European tour of over two years when he met his mother in Portugal. An only child, both of his parents were unemployed when he was born, though his father later obtained work in industry. He grew up mostly in Almada, apart from a brief spell in Estarreja through his father's work.

Çelikkaya was a youth player at C.F. Os Belenenses, alongside Ruben Amorim, but began studying to become a coach at an early age after realising that he would not become a professional player. He played college soccer for the Sacred Heart Pioneers in Connecticut.

== Managerial career ==
Çelikkaya's father once gave him a book called The Theory of Collective Sport, which shaped his coaching philosophy. One of his early roles was in S.L. Benfica's academy. He left alongside Bruno Lage to become his assistant at Al Ahli SC in the Qatar Stars League. He assisted Luís Castro at G.D. Chaves, Vitória de Guimarães and FC Shakhtar Donetsk.

In 2020, Amorim became manager of Sporting CP and appointed Çelikkaya to the reserve team. During his four years at the club, 25 players graduated from the reserves to the first team, including Eduardo Quaresma and Geny Catamo. In May 2024, Çelikkaya left to pursue first-team opportunities.

In December 2024, Çelikkaya rejected an offer from Beşiktaş J.K. of the Turkish Süper Lig, who had sacked Giovanni van Bronckhorst. On 8 January 2025, he was hired as an assistant to Gregg Berhalter at Chicago Fire FC in Major League Soccer.

On 22 June 2026, Çelikkaya was confirmed as manager of Zalaegerszegi TE in Hungary on a one-year deal. He replaced compatriot Nuno Campos.
