= Antal Simon =

Hungarian footballer

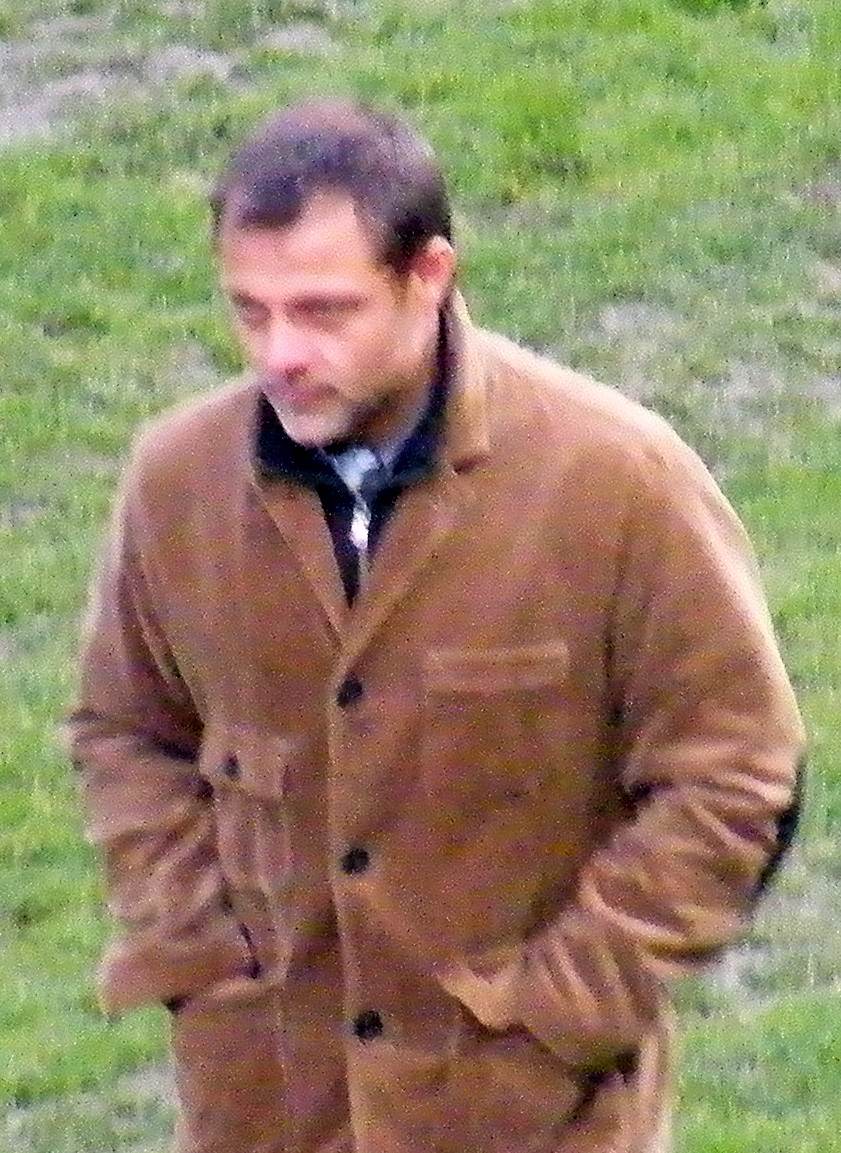

Personal information
- Full name: Antal Simon in 2010.
- Date of birth: 27 September 1965 (age 61)
- Place of birth: Hajdúnánás
- Position: Midfielder

Senior career*
Years	Team	Apps	(Gls)
1984–1986	Egri FC		
1988–1990	Egri FC		
1991–1994	Vác FC		
1994–1997	Vasas SC		
1998	TPV Tampere		
1999	FC Lahti		
1999	TPV Tampere		
2000	FC Winterthur		

Managerial career
- 2011–2013: Egri FC
- 2013: Zalaegerszegi TE
- * Club domestic league appearances and goals

Antal Simon (born 27 September 1965) is a retired Hungarian football midfielder.
