= Barna Dobos =

Hungarian football manager

Personal information
- Date of birth: 12 May 1970 (age 56)
- Place of birth: Mór, Hungary

Managerial career
- Years: Team
- 2012–2015: Dunaújváros
- 2016–2018: Dunaújváros
- 2018–2020: Zalaegerszeg
- 2020: Szeged-Csanád GA
- 2021: Győri ETO

Barna Dobos (born 12 May 1970) is a Hungarian football manager.

== Career ==
He started his career as a youth coach. From 2005 to 2012 he has worked at Dunaújváros FC, Videoton FC and Puskás Akadémia FC. In 2012, he took over the Dunaújváros third division team as main coach, winning the championship in 2012-13 Nemzeti Bajnokság III and immediately qualifying for Nemzeti Bajnokság II.

In the 2013–2014 season, he once again performed with his team, finishing second with the Dunaújváros PASE in the second division.

In September 2018 he became the head coach of the Zalaegerszeg TE.
