= Imre Gellei =

Hungarian football manager (born 1950)

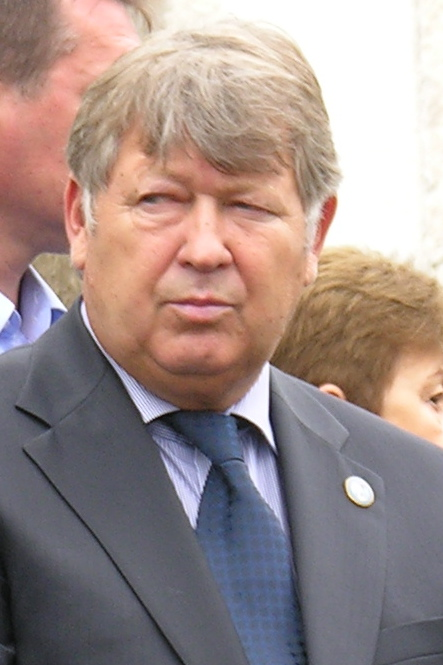

Personal information
- Date of birth: 29 March 1950 (age 76)
- Place of birth: Badacsonytomaj, Hungary

Youth career
- 1964–1968: Vasútépítő Törekvés

Senior career*
Years	Team	Apps	(Gls)
1968–1969	MÁV TIAC		
1969–1970	H. Szamuely SE		
1970–1974	TFSE		
1974–1977	NIKE Fűzfői AK		

Managerial career
- 1977–1983: Keszthelyi Haladás
- 1983–1986: Zalaegerszegi TE
- 1986: Győri ETO FC
- 1987–1988: Keszthelyi Haladás
- 1988–1990: BFC Siófok
- 1991–1992: Vasas SC
- 1992–1994: MTK Hungaria FC
- 1995–1998: Vasas SC
- 2001–2003: Hungary
- 2004–2005: Zalaegerszegi TE
- 2005–2007: Ferencvaros
- 2007–2010: Paksi SE
- 2010–2013: Puskás Akadémia FC (sporting director)
- * Club domestic league appearances and goals

Imre Gellei (born 29 March 1950) is a Hungarian football manager and former player. He served as manager of Hungary national team between 2001 and 2003.
