= Tibor Sisa =

Hungarian football manager

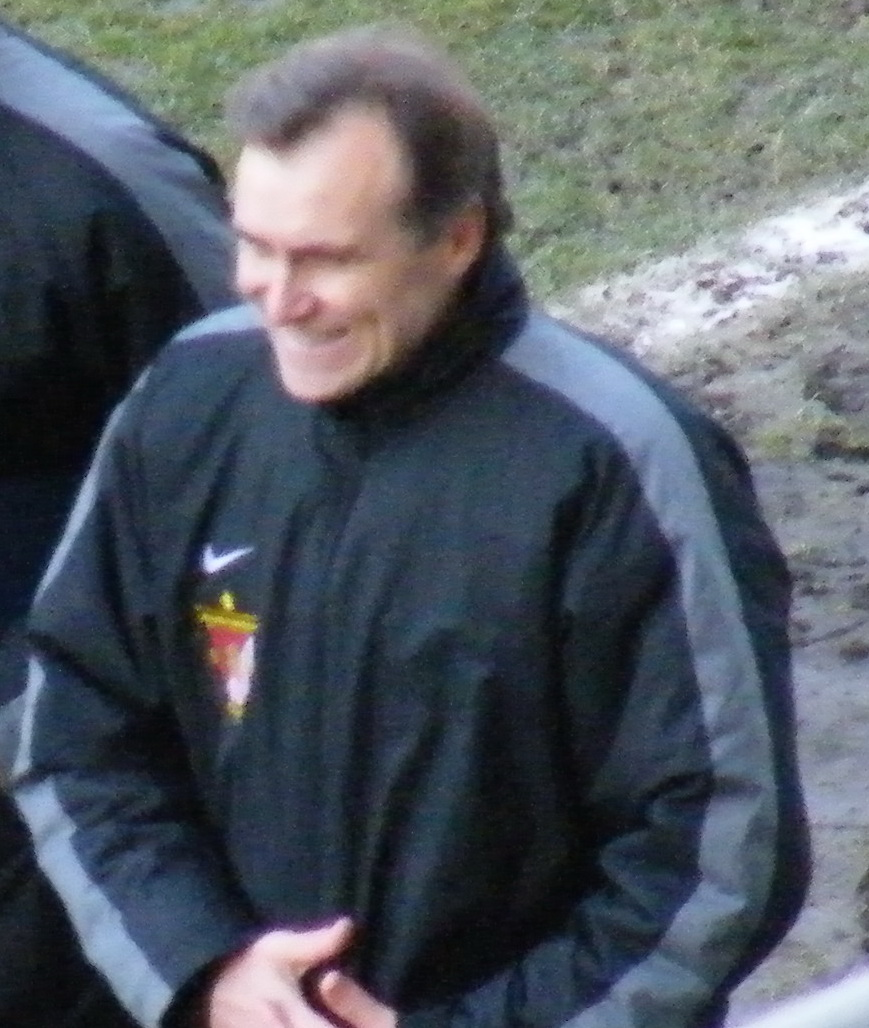

Personal information
- Date of birth: 1 December 1960 (age 65)
- Place of birth: Salgótarján, Hungary

Senior career*
Years	Team	Apps	(Gls)
1985–1986	Salgótarjáni BTC		

Managerial career
- 2003–2004: Budapest Honvéd FC
- 2004: Tatabányai SC
- 2008–2009: Diósgyőri VTK
- 2009: Budapest Honvéd FC
- 2010–2012: Kaposvári Rákóczi FC
- 2012: Diósgyőri VTK
- 2013–2015: Gyirmót FC Győr
- * Club domestic league appearances and goals

Tibor Sisa (born 1 December 1960) is a Hungarian professional football manager and former player.

== Managerial career ==
=== Honvéd ===
On 25 February 2009, he was appointed as the manager of Budapest Honvéd FC. On 24 October 2009, he was sacked.

=== Kaposvár ===
On 9 June 2009, he was appointed as the manager of Kaposvári Rákóczi FC.

=== Diósgyőr ===
On 22 November 2012, he resigned as the manager of Diósgyőr.

=== Gyirmót ===
On 13 June 2013, he was appointed as the Nemzeti Bajnokság II club Gyirmót FC Győr.

=== Vác ===
On 18 June 2015, he was appointed as the manager of Vác FC.

== Personal ==
He teaches at the Eszterházy Károly Catholic University.

In an interview published on Telex.hu, he said that in 2010 he was offered a position at Puskás Akadémia FC. However, he did not accept the offer immediately. He said to the owners of the club that he needed a couple of days to think it over. Interestingly, a couple of days later, a new manager was announced at Puskás. Sisa learned it from a newspaper. Sisa said that after this event he did not receive any offers from Nemzeti Bajnokság I clubs and his football manager career was over.
