= Olivér Mink =

Hungarian footballer and coach

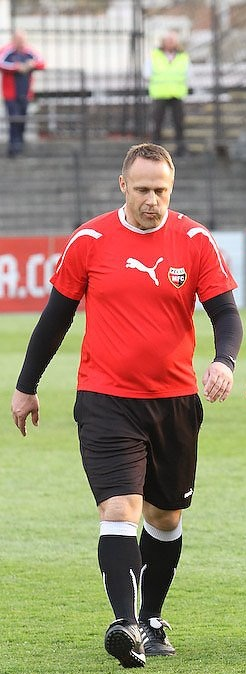

Personal information
- Date of birth: 11 April 1970 (age 56)
- Place of birth: Pécs, Hungary

Managerial career
- Years: Team
- Szent Pál Akadémia FC (Head coach)
- –2010: Pécsi VSK (Head coach)
- 2010–2011: Kozármisleny SE (U-19 team coach)
- 2011–2012: Pécsi MFC (Assistant coach)
- 2012–: Pécsi MFC (Head coach)

Olivér Mink (born 11 April 1970) is a Hungarian football coach and former player who was the head coach of Hungarian first division club Pécsi MFC. He was one of the youngest head coaches in the league and he has not worked as head coach in the first division before. He is married with three children. He is now the head coach of Pécsi VSK

== Playing career ==
Born in Pécs, Hungary, Mink started football in Pécs-Vasas, in the suburbs of Pécs, where he spent his childhood, thus his first team was Vasasi Bányász Torna Club. Later, as his talent was noticed by local scouts and coaches, he played for the youth team of Pécsi VSK and other clubs in town, such as Pécsi Kesztyűgyár SE. At the age of 17, he joined the junior team of Komlói Bányász SK, where he played in the junior championship and the Hungarian Second Division also. After playing in Komló, Mink moved to Budapest, where he played in the youth team of Újpest FC and became national youth champion with the club two times. Even though he had a fair career as a youth player, Mink never played in the Hungarian First Division, he spent a few seasons in lower levels instead. At the age of 21, in 1991, he went to Austria to play for a third division team. Later he returned to Hungary for personal reasons and continued to play football at regional level before finally retiring.

== Coaching career ==
Mink started his coaching career already, when he was a player, as he worked as a player-coach for the Szent Pál Akadémia FC (Saint Paul Academy FC), a club in the first division of the Budapest-championship. After working in Budapest, Mink got appointed as head coach for Pécsi VSK, where they competed in the third division. Later he worked with the under-19 team of Kozármisleny SE in the Second Division. Meanwhile, Mink received his UEFA Pro Licence diploma, after finishing successfully a coaching course of the Hungarian FA. The next significant step in his coaching career was, when he got appointed as assistant coach for Pécsi MFC under head coach Ferenc Mészáros on 15 March 2011. When Mészáros and Mink took over the managing, Pécsi MFC was on the first place of the second league, and after a few disappointing games initially, the team gained promotion to the OTP Bank Liga after four years spent in the second division. Mink continued to work as assistant coach with Ferenc Mészáros in the 2011–12 season, and the team performed surprisingly well, standing at the sixth place at the winter-break and being unbeaten at home. In the second half of the championship, Pécsi MFC performed quite poorly, which lead to the sacking of head coach Mészáros. The next day the management of the club appointed Mink as the new head coach of the team until the end of the current season. Mink made his debut on 7 April 2012 against Újpest FC.
