= Péter Bozsik =

Hungarian football manager (born 1961)

Personal information
- Date of birth: 30 October 1961 (age 64)
- Place of birth: Budapest, Hungary

Youth career
- 1977–1978: Vasas SC
- 1978–1980: Budapest Honvéd

Senior career*
| Years | Team | Apps | (Gls) |
| 1980–1994 | Pénzügyőr SE | | |

Managerial career
- 1994–2000: Pénzügyőr SE
- 2001: Vasas SC
- 2001–2003: Zalaegerszegi TE
- 2003–2004: Szombathelyi Haladás
- 2006: Hungary
- 2013–2014: Tatabánya FC
- 2016–: Komárom VSE
- * Club domestic league appearances and goals

Péter Bozsik (born 30 October 1961) is a football manager and son of the international player József Bozsik, who was part of the Golden Team of the 1950s and managed the Hungarian team in 1974.

After an unremarkable career as a football player, Péter Bozsik turned manager and was so far employed by Vasas SC, Zalaegerszegi TE and Szombathelyi Haladás. Bozsik achieved his first success a third position in the Hungarian Championship with Vasas SC. The team from Zalaegerszeg, where he was from 2001 to 2003, he led to its greatest success, their first Hungarian Championship in 2002. During the 2002–03 UEFA Champions League, ZTE defeated Croatian champions NK Zagreb and caused an upset with their surprise 1–0 victory against Manchester United in the first leg of their qualifier. The decisive goal was scored by the 20-year-old substitute Koplárovics Béla who instantly became a celebrity and a household name with Hungarian football fans.

In May 2006 he became as successor to Lothar Matthäus manager of the Hungary national team. However his tenure ended already in October the same year, after a defeat against Malta. He was followed by Péter Várhidi.

== Honours ==
- Hungarian Championship: 2002 (with Zalaegerszegi TE)
