= Gábor Boér =

Hungarian football player and manager (born 1982)

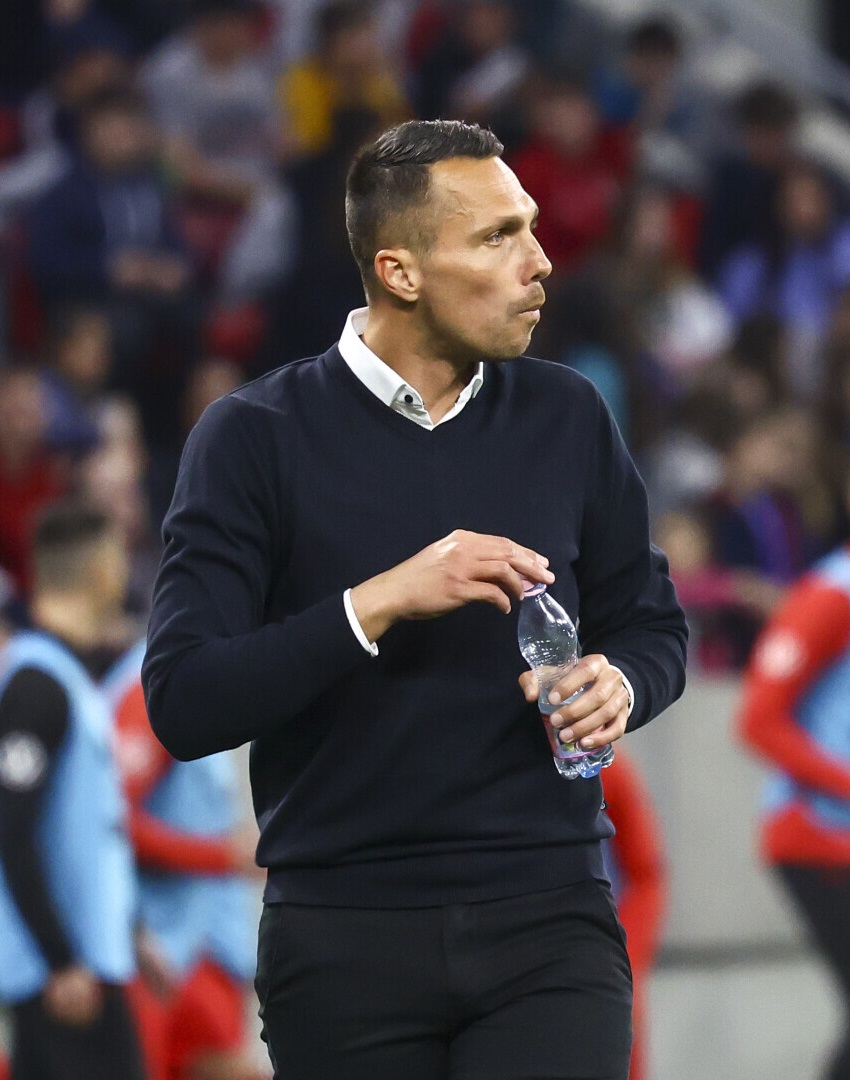
- Boér managing Zalaegerszeg at the 2023 Magyar Kupa final

Personal information
- Date of birth: 19 December 1982 (age 43)
- Place of birth: Orosháza, Hungary
- Height: 1.85 m (6 ft 1 in)
- Position: Midfielder

Youth career
- –2001: Újpest

Senior career*
Years	Team	Apps	(Gls)
2001–2002	Újpest	3	(0)
2002–2003	Ashdod	7	(0)
2003–2004	Dabas		
2004–2005	Rákospalota		
2006	Lion City Sailors		
2006–2007	Soroksár		
2007	Dabas		
2007–2009	Unione FC		
2009	Kondoros		
2009–2010	Törtel KSK		
2010	Theresienfeld		
2010–2011	Kondoros		
2011–2013	Nagyszénás		

International career
2001	Hungary U21	1	(0)

Managerial career
- 2017–2019: Békéscsaba
- 2019: Győr
- 2020: Kazincbarcika
- 2020–2021: Zalaegerszeg
- 2021: Budafok
- 2022–2023: Nafta 1903
- 2023: Zalaegerszeg
- 2025: Videoton
- * Club domestic league appearances and goals

Gábor Boér (born 19 December 1982) is a Hungarian professional football manager and former player who was most recently the manager of Nemzeti Bajnokság II club Videoton.

== Early life and education ==
Boér started playing football at a young age. Boér attended the University of Szeged.

== Playing career ==
In 2006, Boér signed for Singaporean side Lion City Sailors but left due to failing to adapt to the country.

Boér mainly operated as a midfielder.

== Managerial career ==
Boér has obtained the UEFA A managerial license. In 2021, he was appointed as the manager of Hungarian side Budafoki MTE and in 2022, he was appointed as the manager of Slovenian side NK Nafta 1903. In 2023, he returned to Hungarian side Zalaegerszegi TE, helping the club win the 2023 Magyar Kupa and that was the first time they won the competition.

On 11 June 2024, Békéscsaba announced the appointment of Boér as technical director of the club's academy on a three-year contract.

On 23 June 2025, Boér was appointed as the manager of newly relegated Nemzeti Bajnokság II club Fehérvár. On 10 November 2025, it was announced that he had left the club by mutual consent, having managed the team in 14 competitive matches, including 12 in the NB II and two in the Magyar Kupa.

== Honours ==
=== Manager ===
Zalaegerszeg

- Magyar Kupa: 2022–23
