= Tamás Artner =

Hungarian manager

Personal information
- Date of birth: 25 April 1970 (age 56)
- Place of birth: Szombathely, Hungary

Managerial career
- Years: Team
- 2005–2007: Szombathelyi Haladás
- 2008–2011: Ajka
- 2012–2014: Szombathelyi Haladás
- 2015: Dunaújváros
- 2016: Ajka (director of sports)
- 2017: Kaposvári Rákóczi
- 2017–2018: Zalaegerszeg

Tamás Artner (born 25 April 1970) is a Hungarian football manager.

== Career ==
On 8 July 2005, Artner was appointed as the manager of the Hungarian League club Szombathelyi Haladás.

In December 2011, he was reappointed as manager of Szombathelyi Haladás, initially on a one-and-a-half year contract. He was sacked in October 2014.

He was appointed as manager of Dunaújváros in March 2015. He resigned in December 2015.

On 1 January 2016, he was announced as sporting director of FC Ajka. His contract was terminated in April and the club were relegated at the end of the season.

He worked as sporting director of the Fehér Miklós Football Academy at Győri ETO FC from September 2019 for a year and a half, and later led the academy at Veszprémi Foci Centrum Utánpótlás Sportegyesület. He became academy director at Győri ETO FC in summer 2022.
