= László Prukner =

Hungarian footballer and manager

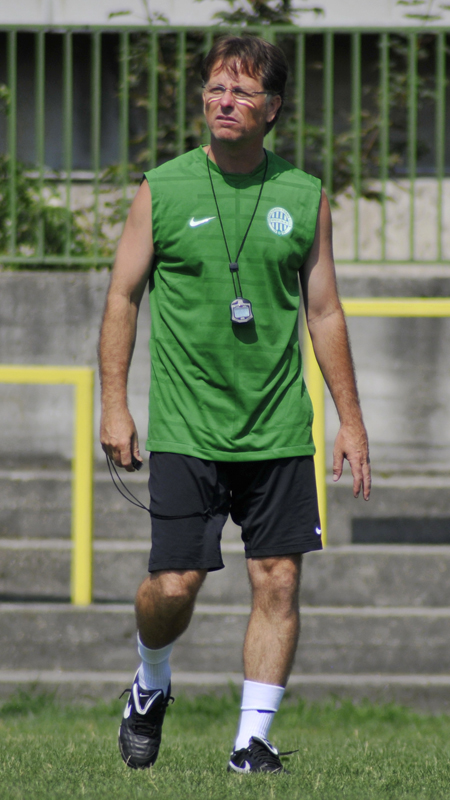

Personal information
- Date of birth: 14 November 1960 (age 65)
- Place of birth: Dunaújváros

Team information
- Current team: Budafoki MTE (manager)

Youth career
- 1972–1978: Dunaújvárosi Kohász

Senior career*
Years	Team	Apps	(Gls)
1978–1981	Dunaújvárosi Kohász		
1981–1983	Pécsi EAC		
1983–1984	Szegedi EOL		
1984–1989	Kaposvári Rákóczi FC		
1989–1991	SK Altheim		
1991–1994	Kaposvári Rákóczi FC		

Managerial career
- 1990–1991: SK Altheim (youth)
- 1991–2001: Kaposvári Rákóczi FC (youth)
- 2001–2003: Kaposvári Rákóczi FC (assistant)
- 2001: Kaposvári Rákóczi FC (caretaker)
- 2003–2010: Kaposvári Rákóczi FC
- 2010–2011: Ferencvárosi TC
- 2011–2012: Zalaegerszegi TE
- 2012–2014: Kaposvári Rákóczi FC
- 2015: Kaposvári Rákóczi FC
- 2016–2017: Budafoki MTE
- * Club domestic league appearances and goals

László Prukner (born 14 November 1960) is a Hungarian football manager and former player, formerly managing Ferencvárosi TC, where he was in charge from 2010 to 2011. Prukner previously managed Kaposvári Rákóczi FC.

== Playing career ==
Prukner was born in Dunaújváros. He started his career in the Dunaújvárosi Kohász and he played for three years in the Hungarian First Division. He spent two years at Pécsi EAC, then five years at Kaposvári Rákóczi FC. He spent two years in Austria with SK Altheim and he finished his career in Hungary.

== Coaching career ==
=== Kaposvári Rákoczi FC ===
Prukner started his coaching career in Kaposvár, where he managed the local team Kaposvári Rákóczi FC in 2003. He managed to spend six years at the club which was quite unusual that time.

=== Ferencvárosi ===
In 2010, Prukner became the manager of the Budapest team Ferencvárosi TC. In the last round Ferencváros were competing with Zalaegerszegi TE and Debreceni VSC for the third position of the Hungarian Championship. Ferencváros beat Lombard-Pápa TFC 3–0 in the Albert Stadion, therefore Ferencváros finished third. Ferencváros beat Armenian Ulisses in the first round of the UEFA Europa League 2011–12 season. In the second round of the Europa League Ferencvaros beat 2–1 the Norwegian Aalesunds FK at the Albert Stadion but lost 2–1 in Ålesund, Norway. In the extra time Aalesunds scored a goal in the 109th minute and Ferencváros said farewell to the Europa League. In August 2011 he resigned from his position after an unsuccessful start in the Hungarian League and the early farewell from the Europa League.

=== Zalaegerszeg ===
In September 2011 Prukner was appointed the manager of Zalaegerszeg after János Csank resigned from his position due to an unsuccessful start in the Hungarian League. Prukner had to debut at the Albert Stadion against his former team Ferencváros. Prukner lost his first match by 2–0.

== Managerial statistics ==
As of 1 June 2011

Team	Nat	From	To	Record							
Team	Nat	From	To	P	W	D	L	GF	GA	GD	W%
Ferencváros	(Hungary)	2010	present	30	15	5	10	50	43	+7	50.0
Total				30	15	5	10	50	43	+7	50.0
