= Gábor Márton =

Hungarian footballer and manager

Personal information
- Date of birth: 15 October 1966 (age 60)
- Place of birth: Pécs, Hungary
- Height: 1.82 m (5 ft 11 1/2 in)
- Position: Midfielder

Senior career*
Years	Team	Apps	(Gls)
1985–1990	Pécs	90	(4)
1990–1992	Genk	42	(0)
1992–1993	Kispest–Honvéd	41	(5)
1993–1994	Cannes	17	(0)
1994–1995	Pécs	25	(1)
1995–1997	Hapoel Kfar Saba	38	(5)
1997–1999	Hapoel Petah Tikva	56	(5)
1999	Hapoel Tel Aviv	12	(1)
1999–2000	Hapoel Ironi	13	(3)
2000–2004	Pécs	85	(24)
2004–2005	Güssing	38	(43)
2005–2007	Barcs	36	(6)

International career
1990–1995	Hungary	21	(1)

Managerial career
- 2009: Pécs
- 2010–2013: Kozármisleny
- 2013–2014: Pécs
- 2014: Kaposvár
- 2015–2018: Pécs
- 2019: Siófok
- 2020: Zalaegerszeg
- 2020–2021: Fehérvár
- 2021–2022: MTK Budapest
- 2023: Kozármisleny
- 2023–2025: Zalaegerszeg
- * Club domestic league appearances and goals

Gábor Márton (born 15 September 1966) is a Hungarian football manager and former player.

== Managerial career ==
=== Zalaegerszeg ===
On 10 February 2020, he was appointed as the manager of Zalaegerszegi TE. He managed to keep the team in the Nemzeti Bajnokság I. At the end of the 2019-20 Nemzeti Bajnokság I season, he was approached by Fehérvár FC.

=== Fehérvár ===
On 8 July 2020, he was appointed as the manager of Fehérvár FC. On 17 February 2021, he was sacked from Fehérvár after 4 defeats in five matches in the 2020–21 Nemzeti Bajnokság I season.

=== MTK Budapest ===
Márton was hired by MTK Budapest in November 2021. He was fired by MTK on 23 April 2022, with MTK winning 3 out of 17 league games under his management.

=== Kozármisleny ===
On 2 March 2023, Márton returned to Kozármisleny, with the club in last place in the second-tier NB II.

=== Zalaegerszeg ===
On 12 November 2023, he was appointed as the manager of Zalaegerszegi TE.

On 23 April 2025, he was sacked after losing to Paks 2-1 in the 2024–25 Magyar Kupa semi-finals.
