= István Mihalecz (footballer, born 1973) =

Hungarian footballer and manager

Personal information
- Date of birth: 6 September 1973 (age 53)
- Place of birth: Zalaegerszeg, Hungary

Team information
- Current team: Zalaegerszegi TE (manager)

Managerial career
- Years: Team
- 2009: Kozármisleny SE
- 2010: Hévíz SK
- 2013–2014: FC Ajka
- 2016: Zalaegerszegi TE
- 2018–2019: BFC Siófok
- 2025: Zalaegerszegi TE

István Mihalecz (born 6 September 1973) is a Hungarian football manager and a former player. His father is also a football manager, named István Mihalecz.

== Managerial career ==
=== Kozármisleny ===
Mihalecz was the manager of Nemzeti Bajnokság II club Kozármisleny SE in the 2008–09 Nemzeti Bajnokság II season.

=== Zalaegerszeg ===
On 23 April 2025, he was appointed as the manager of Nemzeti Bajnokság I club Zalaegerszegi TE, after the club sacked Gábor Márton.
