= Attila Supka =

Hungarian footballer and manager

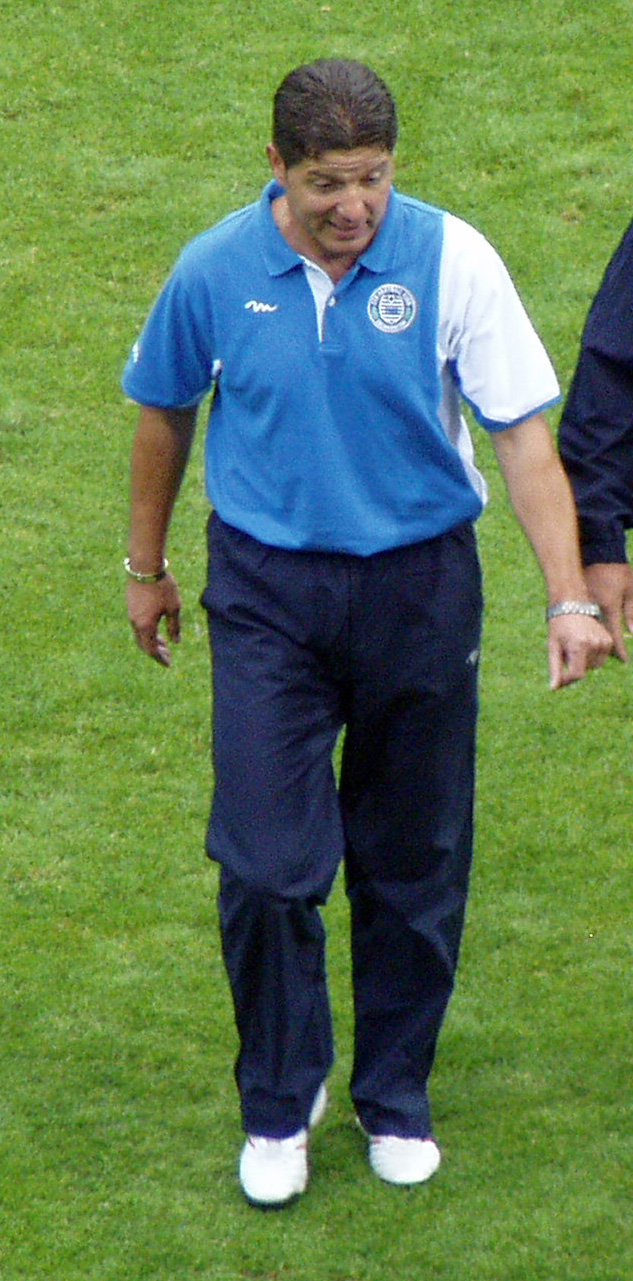

Personal information
- Date of birth: 19 September 1962 (age 64)
- Place of birth: Hatvan, Hungary
- Position: Forward

Senior career*
Years	Team	Apps	(Gls)
1974–1982	Budapest Honvéd		
1982–1984	Kecskemeti TE		
1984	Újpest FC		
1984–1987	Debreceni VSC		
1987–1988	Videoton FC		
1988–1992	SC Eisenstadt		
1992	FC Sopron		

Managerial career
- 1996: Soproni FAC
- 1997–1998: Soproni FAC
- 1999–2000: AC Petõháza
- 2000–2002: Artheim
- 2003–2004: Békéscsaba 1912 Előre SE
- 2004–2006: Debreceni VSC
- 2006–2008: Budapest Honvéd
- 2008–2009: Zalaegerszegi TE
- 2009: Nea Salamis Famagusta FC
- 2011–2012: Budapest Honvéd
- 2012: Pécsi MFC
- 2013–2017: Soproni VSE
- 2017: Szegedi AK
- 2017–2019: Budapest Honvéd
- 2019: Haladás
- 2020–2021: Kisvárda
- 2021–2022: Mezőkövesd
- * Club domestic league appearances and goals

Attila Supka (born 19 September 1962) is a Hungarian football manager and former player. He was one of the most successful Hungarian coaches in the 2000s.

== Honours ==
=== As a manager ===
Debreceni VSC

- Hungarian National Championship I: 2004–05, 2005–06

Budapest Honvéd FC

- Hungarian Cup: 2006–07 runner-up 2007–08
