= Pécsi MFC =

Hungarian football club

- Full name: Pécsi Mecsek Football Club
- Nicknames: Pamacs, Munkás (Worker)
- Short name: PMFC
- Founded: 1950; 76 years ago (as Pécsi Dózsa)
- Ground: Stadion PMFC
- Capacity: 7,000
- Chairman: János Győri
- Manager: László Vas
- League: NB III; Southwest
- 2023–24: NB II, 15th of 18 (relegated)
- Website: pmfc.hu
Home colours	Away colours

Pécsi Mecsek Football Club, commonly referred to as Pécsi MFC or simply PMFC, is a professional Hungarian football club based in Pécs, Baranya, that currently competes in the Hungarian third division. The club was established on 16 February 1973 by the merger of five other clubs from the city, Pécsi Dózsa, Pécsi Ércbányász SC, Pécsi Helyiipari SK, Pécsi Bányász SC and Pécsi Építők.

Pécsi MFC's home ground is the Stadium of PMFC, also known as Stadium of Újmecsekalja, a football stadium in Uránváros. The stadium's current capacity is 7,000 and was opened in 1955.

Pécsi MFC holds long-standing rivalries with other football clubs, most notably Szentlőrinc SE from Szentlőrinc, Komlói Bányász SK, a club based in Komló, a city near Pécs, and Kaposvári Rákóczi FC from Kaposvár.

Since its foundation in 1973, the club played most of their seasons in the first division, with twelve seasons spent in the second division. After finishing first place in the Western Group of the second division in 2011, the club was promoted to the highest level professional league.

Despite finishing 11th in the 2014–15 season, the club lost its professional licence due to financial difficulties and gained admittance to the fourth tier of the Hungarian league system in time for the start of the following season. The relegation saw owner Dezső Matyi leaving the club after 8 years, when he sold his share to the city of Pécs.

Pécsi are best known for becoming the first European opponents of Universitatea Craiova when they played against the White-Blues in the 1970–71 Fairs Cup.

== History ==
=== Early years (1950–1972) ===
Although association football had been present in Pécs since the early 20th century, the predecessor of Pécsi MFC was founded later, in 1950 with the name Pécsi Dózsa. The new club started to compete in the third division and eventually won promotion to the second division in 1953. After spending only two years in the NB II with moderate success, Pécsi Dózsa started the 1950 season in the top flight of the Hungarian football pyramid, after a fusion with Budapest-based club Kőbányai Dózsa SE. Pécsi Dózsa made its debut in the first division on 27 February 1955, with a 3–0 win against Szombathely. With only one year of hiatus, Pécsi Dózsa was a member of the NB I until 1972, when the club underwent another, more complex fusion with four other local clubs.

=== From Pécsi Dózsa to Pécsi MSC ===
Pécs played in second division in the 1975–76 season. They finished as champions of the second division in the 1976–77season. They then played in the first division for 20 years between 1977 and 1997. They also won the Hungarian Cup in 1990.

In the then European Cup Winners Cup they were drawn against Manchester United, and became the first team to play against English opposition in Europe since English teams were banned five years previously. They lost the game 3–0 on aggregate, and Manchester United went on to win the competition, beating Barcelona in the final.

In 2003 Pécs rejoined the first division after two years of exile. They drew with Szombathelyi Haladás and finished first eleven points clear. Tamás Nagy's team lost only three games out of 34 matches.

The club won the 2019–20 Nemzeti Bajnokság III season which was interrupted and finally terminated in May 2020 due to the COVID-19 pandemic. Pécs was then eligible to play in the 2020-21 Nemzeti Bajnokság II.

On 29 June 2022, Ádám Weitner was appointed as the coach of the club.

On 21 February 2024, János Mátyus was appointed as the coach of the club.

In March 2025, the club asked a loan from the city of Pécs to be able to finish the 2024–25 Nemzeti Bajnokság III season.

On 24 April 2025, the club paid their tribute to József Garami who was a formal manager of the club and also a native from Pécs.

On 7 May 2025, Zoltán Aczél was sacked.

== Ownership ==
On 13 September 2024, it was announced that Csaba Rabi purchased 80% of the shares of the club becoming the biggest stakeholder.

== Current squad ==
Note: Flags indicate national team as defined under FIFA eligibility rules; some limited exceptions apply. Players may hold more than one non-FIFA nationality.

No.	Pos.	Nation	Player
2	MF	HUN	Péter Beke
4	DF	HUN	Márk Németh
5	DF	HUN	Csaba Preklet
7	FW	HUN	Zoltán Tóth
9	MF	HUN	Tamás Hleba
10	FW	HUN	Márk Hegedüs
11	FW	HUN	András Bukovics
13	GK	HUN	Donát Helesfay
15	FW	HUN	Mátyás Ócsai
17	FW	HUN	Bence Vas
18	MF	HUN	Áron Morvai
19	MF	HUN	Richárd Rabatin

No.	Pos.	Nation	Player
20	DF	HUN	Szabolcs Füredi
24	DF	HUN	Konstantinos Ikonomou
29	FW	HUN	Bence Daru
31	MF	HUN	Gergő Szalánszki
41	GK	HUN	Péter Ipacs
55	DF	HUN	Noel Lengyel
77	MF	HUN	Edvin Bachesz
79	FW	HUN	Roland Vajda
81	GK	HUN	Dániel Varasdi
99	FW	HUN	Áron Fejős
—	DF	HUN	Nagy
—	DF	HUN	Milán Sági

=== Out on loan ===
Note: Flags indicate national team as defined under FIFA eligibility rules; some limited exceptions apply. Players may hold more than one non-FIFA nationality.

No.	Pos.	Nation	Player
—	GK	HUN	Szilveszter Nagy (at Szentlőrinc until 30 June 2024)
—	DF	HUN	Péter Miklós (at Szentlőrinc until 30 June 2024)

No.	Pos.	Nation	Player
—	DF	HUN	Kolos Orbán (at Pécsi EAC until 30 June 2024)
—	DF	UKR	Oleksiy Shvedyuk (at Siófok until 30 June 2024)

== Stadium ==
Stadion PMFC is a UEFA Category 1 football stadium in Pécs, Hungary. It is currently used for football matches and is the home stadium of Pécsi MFC. The stadium is able to hold 7,000 people and was opened in 1955. The stadium used to be referred to as "PMSC stadion" due to the old name of the local team, and sometimes referred to as "Újmecsekaljai stadion", which is derived from the name of the district, where the stadium is located.

== Name changes ==
- 1950: Dózsa (Pécsi Dózsa Sport Club)
- 1973: PMSC (Pécsi Munkás Sport Club) amalgamation with Pécsi Bányász SC (founded in 1921 as DVAC), Pécsi Ércbányász SC (founded in 1957), Pécsi Helyiipar SK (founded in 1957) and Pécsi Építők (founded in 1949)
- 1995: PMFC (Pécsi Mecsek Futball Club)

== Honours ==
- Nemzeti Bajnokság I:
  - Runners-up (1): 1985–86
  - Third Place (1): 1990–91
- Nemzeti Bajnokság II:
  - Winners (4): 1958–59, 1976–77, 2002–03, 2010–11
- Nemzeti Bajnokság III:
  - Winners (1): 2019–20
- Hungarian Cup:
  - Winners (1): 1989–90
  - Runners-up (2): 1977–78, 1986–87
- Hungarian League Cup:
  - Runners-up (1): 2008–09

== European cup history ==
=== UEFA Cup Winners' Cup ===
Season	Competition	Round	Country	Club	Home	Away	Aggregate
1990–91	UEFA Cup Winners' Cup	1. Round	(England)	Manchester United	0–2	0–1	0–3

=== UEFA Intertoto Cup ===
Season	Competition	Round	Country	Club	Home	Away	Aggregate
1962–63	UEFA Intertoto Cup	Group 8	(Netherlands)	Blauw-Wit Amsterdam	5–2	0–0	
		Group 8	(Socialist Federal Republic of Yugoslavia)	FK Velež Mostar	4–1	2–1	
		Group 8	(West Germany)	VfV Hildesheim	5–3	1–0	
		Quarter-finals	(Socialist Federal Republic of Yugoslavia)	NK Rijeka	2–1	2–2	4–3
		Semi-finals	(Italy)	Calcio Padova	0–3	3–4	3–7
1988	UEFA Intertoto Cup	Group 9	(Switzerland)	Grasshopper FC	0–1	0–1	
		Group 9	(Poland)	Pogoń Szczecin	3–1	0–0	
		Group 9	(Sweden)	Östers IF	2–0	1–3	

=== UEFA Cup ===
Season	Competition	Round	Country	Club	Home	Away	Aggregate
1970–71	Inter-Cities Fairs Cup	1. Round	(Romania)	Universitatea Craiova	3–0	1–2	4–2
		2. Round	(England)	Newcastle United	2–0 (aet)	0–2	2–2 (p)
		3. Round	(Italy)	Juventus FC	0–2	0–1	0–3
1986–87	UEFA Cup	1. Round	(Netherlands)	Feyenoord Rotterdam	1–0	0–2	1–2
1991–92	UEFA Cup	1. Round	(Germany)	VfB Stuttgart	2–2	1–4	3–6

== See also ==
- List of Pécsi MFC managers
- List of Pécsi MFC seasons

=== Other clubs from Pécs ===
- Pécsi Vasutas SK
- Pécs-Baranya FC
