= János Csank =

Association footballer, coach

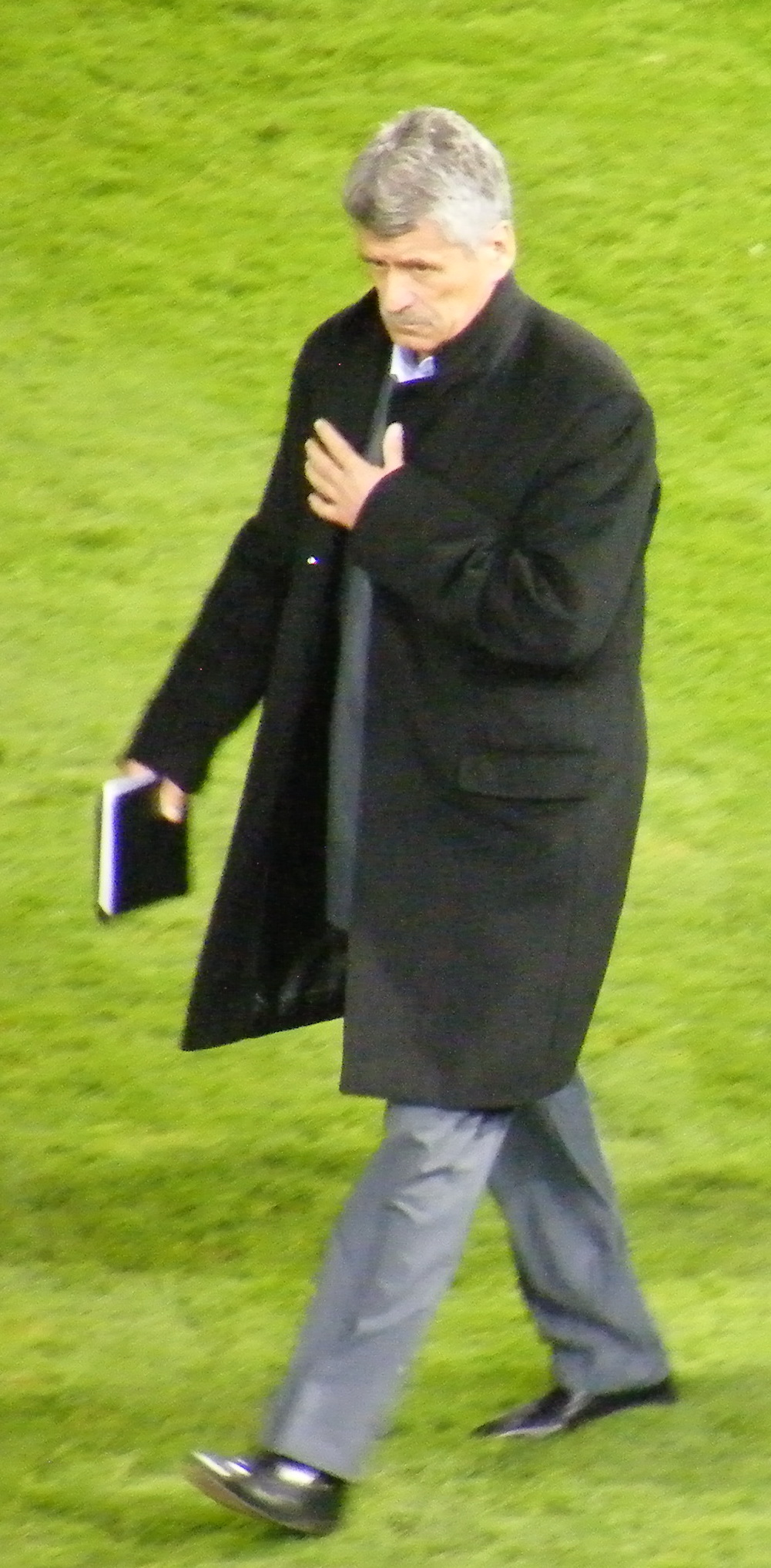

Personal information
- Date of birth: 27 October 1946 (age 80)
- Place of birth: Ózd, Hungary
- Position: Goalkeeper

Managerial career
- Years: Team
- 1984–1985: Egri FC
- 1986–1989: Békéscsabai Előre
- 1989–1995: Vác
- 1995–1996: Proodeftiki F.C.
- 1996–1997: Hungary
- 1998–1999: Vác
- 2000–2002: Ferencváros
- 2002–2003: Siófok
- 2003–2004: Videoton
- 2005–2006: Sopron
- 2006: Győri ETO
- 2006–2007: Diósgyőr
- 2007–2008: Ferencváros
- 2008–2011: Zalaegerszegi TE
- 2012–2013: Gyirmót SE
- 2013–2015: Vác FC
- 2015–2016: Zalaegerszegi TE
- 2017–: Kárpátalja

János Csank (born 27 October 1946, in Ózd, Hungary) is a Hungarian former goalkeeper and football manager.

== Club coaching career ==
Csank won the National-Championship twice, first in 1994 with Vác FC-Samsung and in 2001 in charge of Ferencváros.

He resigned from Ferencváros in April 2008 after a 2–2 draw against Makó left Fradi in third place, eight points behind Nemzeti Bajnokság II (Eastern Group) leaders Kecskeméti TE.

== International coaching career ==
Csank was manager of the Hungary national football team between April 1996 and November 1997. During this time, Hungary advanced from the World Cup qualification group but suffered a devastating 1–7, 5–0 defeat against FR Yugoslavia.

After the losses against Yugoslavia, Csank resigned from his position and was followed by Bertalan Bicskei.

== Personal ==
Csank is recognizable for his dark humor. At half-time in the losing match against the Yugoslavian team, when a reporter asked him what he was going to say to the players, he replied: "Surely not to keep it up!". At the end of this match, at the interview he said that the major cause of the loss was, "I didn't know that some of my players were so lame."
