= Zalaegerszegi TE =

Hungarian football club

Zalaegerszeg
- Full name: Zalaegerszegi Torna Egylet Football Club
- Nickname: Zete
- Short name: ZTE
- Founded: 1920; 106 years ago
- Ground: ZTE Arena
- Capacity: 11,200
- Chairman: Andrés Jornet and Damián Pedrosa
- Head coach: Filipe Çelikkaya
- League: Nemzeti Bajnokság I
- 2025–26: NB I, 5th of 12
- Website: www.ztefc.hu
Home colours	Away colours

Zalaegerszegi Torna Egylet Football Club ([ˈzɒlɒɛɡɛrsɛɡi ˈtornɒ ˈɛɟlɛt]), commonly known as Zalaegerszegi TE, Zalaegerszeg or ZTE, is a Hungarian professional football club based in Zalaegerszeg. Zalaegerszeg has won one Hungarian League title in 2002 and one Magyar Kupa title in 2023.

== History ==
ZTE traces its roots back to 1912, at the time of the Austro-Hungarian Empire. Its first match was a 4–2 defeat to a team from Vasvár. The team was first composed of members of a literary and debating society. ZTE flourished under coach József Vadász, but World War I halted its progress. In 1920, Zalaegerszegi TE, or "Gymanistics Club of Zalaegerszeg," was born. They were defeated in their debut match, losing 2–1 to AK Szombathely on August 21, 1920, but were motivated by a crowd of over 2,000 fans.

ZTE's league history began in 1924, when they joined the Hungarian second division. The club won the title a decade later and entered the top flight in 1934. However, the start of World War II under the regime of Admiral Miklós Horthy saw ZTE's field and equipment confiscated. After the war, in 1957, ZTE merged with two other local teams, signalling the rebirth of the club.

=== 1990s ===
From then on to the 1990s, however, ZTE did not really challenge the Hungarian title much. The league was dominated by Budapest club Ferencvárosi TC. In 1994, ZTE managed to gain a solid foothold on the Hungarian first division.

=== 2000s ===
In the 2000s, the club reached their zenith by winning the Hungarian League for the first time in the club history. In the 2001–02 season, Zalaegrszeg finished second in the first stage of the championship gaining 61 points while Budapest rivals MTK Budapest FC 64 points. In the championship play-off Zalaegerszeg secured their first ever league title and finished on 71 points and Péter Bozsik's team overtook Budapest rivals Ferencváros and MTK Budapest along the way. Krisztián Kenesei and Gábor Egressy were the key figures of the title-winning team by scoring 37 goals. In the 2002–03 season, Zalaegerszeg finished in the bottom half of the table and competed in the relegation play-offs. In the following seasons, ZTE would consolidate in the lower half of the table, finishing in 9th, 6th and 11th place respectively.

In the 2002–03 UEFA Champions League qualifying phase Zalaegerszeg faced Croatian champions NK Zagreb. The first match was played in Zalaegerszeg and the club won it 1–0. The only goal was scored by Darko Ljubojević. In the second leg Zagreb was winning by 2–0 when in the 87th minute Zalaegerszeg was awarded a penalty which was converted by Flórián Urbán. ZTE beat Zagreb on away goals. In the third qualifying round Zalaegerszeg faced English giants Manchester United. In the first leg, ZTE provided a stunning shock by winning 1–0 with a last minute goal from Béla Koplárovics. However, in the return leg at Old Trafford, Man United secured a convincing 5–0 victory. Ruud van Nistelrooy scored in the 5th and 75th minute then David Beckham, Paul Scholes, Ole Gunnar Solskjær scored. The English side progressed to the first group stage with a 5–1 aggregate victory. They dropped down to the UEFA Cup where they were crushed 9-1 on aggregate in the first round by Dinamo Zagreb, with a 3–1 loss at home and 6–0 loss away. In the 2006–07 season after nine rounds Zalaegerszeg was on the top of the league table. At the end of the season the club finished third securing a place in the European competitions of the Intertoto Cup 2007. In the spring of 2009 János Csank was appointed as the coach of the club. The success coach has already won two Hungarian League titles. In 1994 with Vác and in 2001 with Ferencváros.

=== 2010s ===
In the 2010–11 season Zalaegerszeg was competing for the Europa League position with Budapest rivals Ferencváros but ZTE finished fourth and could not secure a place for the qualifiers. In the 2011–12 season Zalaegerszeg started the season with five consecutive defeats which resulted the dismissal of János Csank. He was replaced by former Ferencváros coach László Prukner. The first half of the 2011–12 Hungarian League season was a nightmare for the club since they finished last gaining only 6 points without any victories. On April 21, 2012, Zalaegerszeg were relegated to the second division of the Hungarian League after the defeat against titleholders Videoton.

On 15 May 2014, former Zalaegerszeg player Gergely Kocsárdi was elected as director of the club. It was also announced that the company called Pharos '95 gained more than 50% of the shares of the club for about 16 million HUF.

By winning the 2018–19 Nemzeti Bajnokság II season, Zalaegerszeg were promoted to the 2019–20 Nemzeti Bajnokság I season. Zalaegerszeg could win 25 matches, drew seven times and lost only 6 matches in the season. The most prolific goal scorer of the season was Gergely Bobál by scoring 17 goals.

=== 2020s ===
Before the 2020-21 Nemzeti Bajnokság I season it was rumoured that former PSV Eindhoven and Hungary national football team star Balázs Dzsudzsák would be signed by the club. However, Gábor Végh, the owner of the club, claimed that the club had not started any negotiations with Dzsudzsák.

In the 2021–22 Nemzeti Bajnokság I season, Zalaegerszeg finished 8th. One of the most spectacular victories of the season was when Zalaegerszeg beat Ferencváros 2–1 at the Groupama Aréna on 16 October 2021. However, on the negative side, Zalaegerszeg lost to Gyirmót 2–1 at home on 8 May 2022.

On 24 April 2023, Ricardo Moniz was sacked after losing to Debrecen. Moniz was replaced by Gábor Boér. The club also appointed István Sallói as the new sports director.

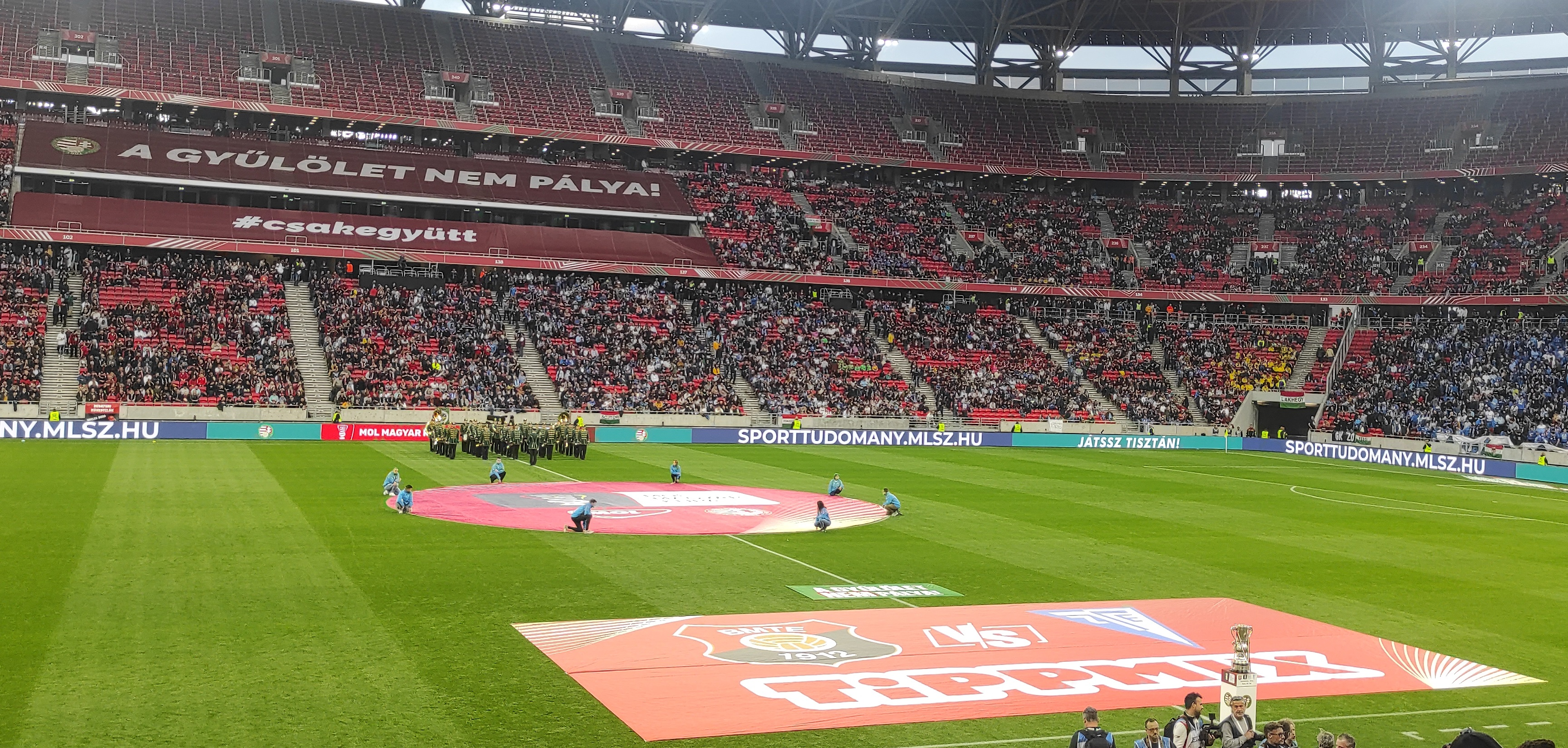
Zalaegerszeg at the Puskás Aréna

Zalaegerzseg entered the 2022–23 Magyar Kupa season on 17 September 2022 in a 2–0 away victory against Kaposvári Rákóczi FC at the Rákóczi Stadion. On 19 October 2022, Zalaegerszeg beat Kazincbarcikai SC 2–0 at the Kolorcity Aréna in the round of 32 of the Magyar Kupa. On 8 February 2023, Zalaegerszeg beat Békéscsaba 1912 Előre 2–0 at the Kórház utcai Stadion in the round of 16 of the Magyar Kupa. Zalaegerszeg beat Mezőkövesdi SE 4–1 in the quarter finals of the Magyar Kupa at the Mezőkövesdi Városi Stadion on 28 February 2023. On 4 April Zalaegerszeg beat Puskás Akadémia 1–0 after extra time in the 2022–23 Magyar Kupa season and qualified for the Magyar Kupa final for the second time in the club's history. On 3 May 2023, Zalaegerszeg beat Budafok in the 2023 Magyar Kupa final at the Puskás Aréna.

On 15 July 2023, Zalaegerszeg beat 1. FC Union Berlin 3–2 in a friendly match at home.

Since Zalaegerszeg won the Magyar Kupa they were eligible to enter the second qualifying round of the 2023–24 UEFA Europa Conference League season. On 27 July 2023, Zalaegerszeg lost 1–0 to NK Osijek at the Opus Arena. The only goal was scored by Ramón Miérez in the 91st minute. In the second tie, Osijek also beat Zalaegerszeg 2–1 at the ZTE Aréna on 3 August 2023. The only Hungarian goal was scored by Eduvie Ikoba in the 82nd minute.

On 13 November 2023, Gábor Márton was appointed as the new coach of the club. Former Honvéd legend, István Pisont, was appointed as the assistant coach. In an interview with Nemzeti Sport, he said that he is optimistic, but he is not expecting an easy ride to keep the club in the first league. The debut ended with a 2–1 defeat against Debrecen on 25 November 2023.

On 23 April 2025, Gábor Márton was sacked after losing to Paksi FC in the 2024–25 Magyar Kupa semi-final at the Fehérvári úti Stadion in Paks. Márton was replaced by István Mihalecz.

On 20 June 2025, the Andrés Jornet and Damián Pedrosa were appointed as the directors of the club. A couple of days later, Nuno Campos was appointed as the manager of the club.

On 19 July 2025, Zalaegerszeg played their last pre-season friendly match against the Premier League club Leicester City F.C.. The match ended with a 1–0 victory for the English side, thanks to Jordan Ayew's goal in the 70th minute.

After the 2025-26 season, Nuno Campos left the club and joined FC Dinamo București. In June 2026, Filipe Çelikkaya was appointed as the coach of the club.

== Crest and colours ==
Former logo, used in the 1990s.

The colours of the club are blue and white.

=== Manufacturers and shirt sponsors ===
The following table shows in detail Zalaegerszegi TE kit manufacturers and shirt sponsors by year:

Period	Kit manufacturer	Shirt sponsor
−2002	adidas	Zalahús
2002–2003	adidas	e·on
2003–2006	Joma	e·on
2006–2008	mass	e·on
2008–2010	mass	–
2010–2012	mass	St.Graal
2012–2013	mass	–
2013–2017	mass	Pharos '95 Kft.
2017–2019	Puma	Pharos '95 Kft.
2019–	2Rule	Pharos '95 Kft.

== Stadiums and facilities ==
Zalaegerszeg play their matches in the ZTE Arena. The stadium is able to host 11200 people. Due to the increased attention Zalaegerszeg played their 2002–03 UEFA Champions League match against Manchester United at the Ferenc Puskás Stadium.

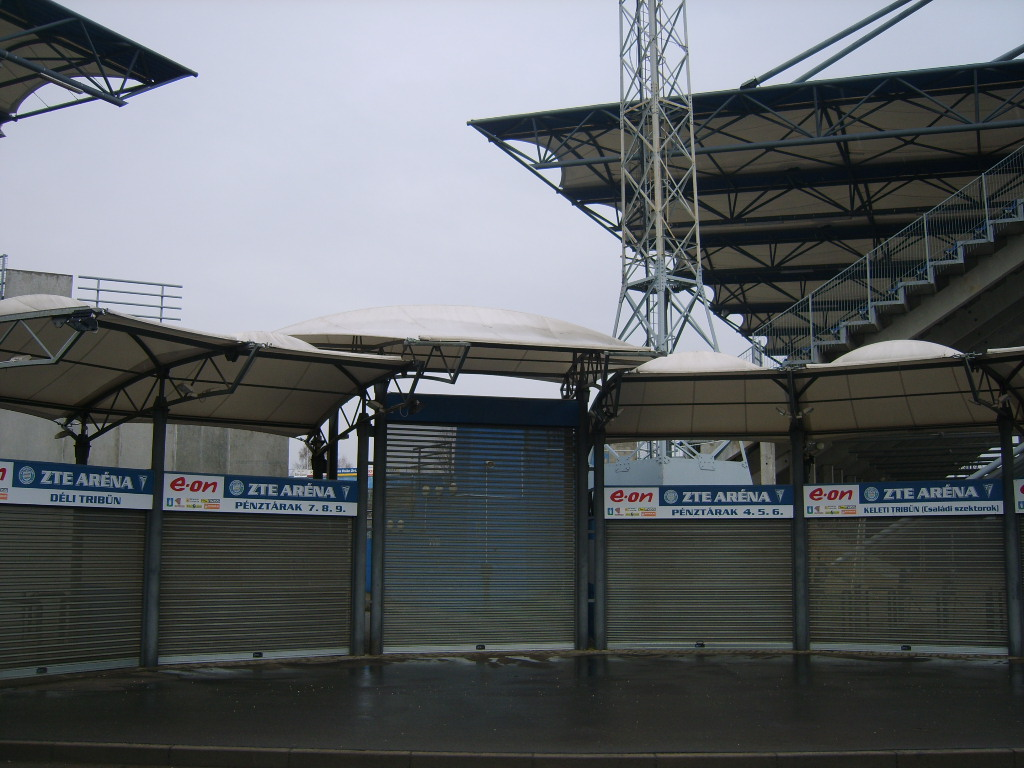
Arena Entry

== Honours ==
- Nemzeti Bajnokság I
  - Winners: 2001–02
- Nemzeti Bajnokság II
  - Winners: 2018–19
- Magyar Kupa
  - Winners: 2022–23

== Seasons ==
=== League positions ===
As of 12 July 2025

- Between 1970–71 and 1971–72 the second tier league called NB I/B.

== Players ==
=== Current squad ===
As of 28 August 2026

Note: Flags indicate national team as defined under FIFA eligibility rules; some limited exceptions apply. Players may hold more than one non-FIFA nationality.

No.	Pos.	Nation	Player
1	GK	HUN	Bence Gundel-Takács
2	DF	USA	Aiden Harangi
3	DF	PAR	Fernando Vera
4	DF	CRC	Joseth Peraza
6	MF	BIH	Emin Kujovic
7	MF	UKR	Danylo Krevsun
8	MF	HUN	András Csonka
9	FW	BRA	Matheus Machado
10	MF	HUN	Bence Kiss
12	DF	MEX	David López
13	DF	ARG	Tiago Peñalba
14	MF	NGR	Jude Madaki
15	MF	ARG	Nicolás Elosú
17	FW	BRA	Guilherme Teixeira
18	DF	ESP	José Calderón

No.	Pos.	Nation	Player
20	FW	PAN	Moisés Richards
21	FW	NGR	Tahir Maigana
23	FW	BRA	Maxsuell Alegria
30	MF	ARG	Fabricio Amato (captain)
31	GK	SLO	Žan Mauricio
32	FW	ARG	Lucas Alfonso
33	DF	BRA	Diogo Silva
47	MF	FRA	Queyrell Tchicamboud
66	DF	HUN	Máté Rózsa
74	FW	HUN	Bence Babos
75	FW	HUN	Máté Kiss
77	FW	BRA	Arthur Henrique (on loan from (Brazil) Fluminense)
80	FW	BRA	Marlon Santos
99	DF	HUN	Zétény Garai

=== Out on loan ===
Note: Flags indicate national team as defined under FIFA eligibility rules; some limited exceptions apply. Players may hold more than one non-FIFA nationality.

No. / Pos. / Nation / Player; — / MF / NED / Divaio Bobson (at Nafta 1903 until 30 June 2027)	No. / Pos. / Nation / Player

== Non-playing staff ==
- Head coach: Filipe Çelikkaya
- 2nd coach: Gonçalo Gil da Silva Cruz
- Assistant coach: João Pedro Pereira Machado Bagão
- Goalkeeper coach: Safet Jahič
- Head of performance: Brian van der Steen
- U-12 U17 coach: William Gallas

== European cup history ==
Season	Competition	Round	Country	Club	Home	Away	Aggregate
1985	UEFA Intertoto Cup	Group 7	(Poland)	Górnik Zabrze	0–1	1–1	
1985	UEFA Intertoto Cup	Group 7	(Switzerland)	Young Boys	4–0	1–4	
1985	UEFA Intertoto Cup	Group 7	(Denmark)	Aarhus GF	1–0	4–4	
2002–03	UEFA Champions League	2nd Qualifying Round	(Croatia)	Zagreb	1–0	1–2	2–2(a)
2002–03	UEFA Champions League	3rd Qualifying Round	(England)	Manchester United	1–0	0–5	1–5
2002–03	UEFA Cup	1st round	(Croatia)	Dinamo Zagreb	1–3	0–6	1–9
2007	UEFA Intertoto Cup	1st round	(Russia)	Rubin Kazan	0–3	0–2	0–5
2010–11	Europa League	Q1	(Albania)	Tirana	0–1	0–0	0–1
2023–24	Europa Conference League	Q2	(Croatia)	Osijek	1−2	0–1	1−3

== European record ==
As of August 14, 2010

Competition	App	Pld	Won	Drn	Lst	GF	GA
UEFA Champions League	1	4	2	0	2	3	7
UEFA Cup/Europa League	2	4	0	1	3	1	10
Intertoto Cup	1	2	0	0	2	0	5

== See also ==
- List of Zalaegerszegi TE managers
- List of Zalaegerszegi TE seasons
