= List of MTK Budapest FC seasons =

Magyar Testgyakorlók Köre Budapest Futball Club is a professional football club based in Budapest, Hungary.

== Key ==
Nemzeti Bajnokság I

- Pld = Matches played
- W = Matches won
- D = Matches drawn
- L = Matches lost
- GF = Goals for
- GA = Goals against
- Pts = Points
- Pos = Final position

Hungarian football league system

- NBI = Nemzeti Bajnokság I
- NBII = Nemzeti Bajnokság II
- NBIII = Nemzeti Bajnokság III
- MBI = Megyei Bajnokság I

Magyar Kupa

- F = Final
- SF = Semi-finals
- QF = Quarter-finals
- R16 = Round of 16
- R32 = Round of 32
- R64 = Round of 64
- R128 = Round of 128

UEFA

- F = Final
- SF = Semi-finals
- QF = Quarter-finals
- Group = Group stage
- PO = Play-offs
- QR3 = Third qualifying round
- QR2 = Second qualifying round
- QR1 = First qualifying round
- PR = Preliminary round

Winners	Runners-up	Third	Promoted	Relegated

== Seasons ==
As of 13 September 2025.

Season	League										Cup	International		Manager	Ref.
Season	Tier	Div.	Pld	W	D	L	GF	GA	Pts.	Pos.	Cup	Competition	Result	Manager	Ref.
1903	1	NBI	14	9	0	5	41	17	18	3rd	TBD	No competition held		(Hungary) Kertész	
1904	1	NBI	16	11	3	2	28	13	25	1st	TBD	No competition held		(Hungary) Kertész	
1905	1	NBI	16	10	3	3	55	11	23	3rd	TBD	No competition held		(Hungary) Kertész	
1906–07	1	NBI	14	10	2	2	67	18	22	3rd	TBD	No competition held		(Hungary) Kertész	
1907–08	1	NBI	16	12	4	0	45	15	28	1st	TBD	No competition held		(Hungary) Szüsz	
1908–09	1	NBI	16	9	2	5	43	19	20	4th	TBD	No competition held		(Hungary) Szüsz	
1909–10	1	NBI	16	11	3	2	42	24	25	2nd	W	No competition held		(Hungary) Szüsz	
1910–11	1	NBI	18	10	4	4	37	18	24	2nd	W	No competition held		(Hungary) Szüsz	
1911–12	1	NBI	18	9	4	5	38	22	22	2nd	W	No competition held		(Scotland) Robertson	
1912–13	1	NBI	18	12	2	4	50	18	26	2nd	TBD	No competition held		(Scotland) Robertson	
1913–14	1	NBI	18	15	3	0	56	12	33	1st	W	No competition held		(England) Holmes	
1916–17	1	NBI	22	21	0	1	113	16	42	1st	TBD	No competition held		(England) Hogan	
1917–18	1	NBI	22	21	1	0	150	10	43	1st	TBD	No competition held		(England) Hogan	
1918–19	1	NBI	22	18	3	1	116	20	39	1st	TBD	No competition held		(England) Hogan	
1919–20	1	NBI	28	26	1	1	113	17	53	1st	TBD	No competition held		(England) Hogan	
1920–21	1	NBI	24	21	2	1	82	9	44	1st	TBD	No competition held		(England) Hogan	
1921–22	1	NBI	22	16	5	1	60	11	37	1st	TBD	No competition held		(England) Burgess	
1922–23	1	NBI	22	17	3	2	61	15	37	1st	W	No competition held		(Hungary) Frontz	
1923–24	1	NBI	22	19	2	1	50	11	40	1st	TBD	No competition held		(Hungary) Frontz	
1924–25	1	NBI	22	18	2	2	65	16	38	1st	W	No competition held		(Hungary) Frontz	
1925–26	1	NBI	22	12	7	3	52	18	31	2nd	TBD	No competition held		(England) Hogan	
1926–27	1	NBI	18	8	3	7	30	24	19	3rd	TBD	No competition held		(England) Hogan	
1927–28	1	NBI	22	16	3	3	68	26	35	2nd	TBD	Mitropa Cup	SF	(Hungary) Feldmann	
1928–29	1	NBI	22	16	5	1	76	24	37	1st	TBD	Mitropa Cup	QF	(England) Hogan	
1929–30	1	NBI	22	10	7	5	54	36	27	3rd	TBD	Mitropa Cup	QF	(Hungary) Révész	
1930–31	1	NBI	22	12	6	4	67	33	30	2nd	TBD	Did not qualify		(England) Hibbert	
1931–32	1	NBI	22	16	3	3	62	24	35	3rd	TBD	Mitropa Cup	QF	(Hungary) Senkey	
1932–33	1	NBI	22	16	4	2	74	28	36	2nd	TBD	Did not qualify		(Hungary) Senkey	
1933–34	1	NBI	22	12	2	8	62	42	26	4th	TBD	Mitropa Cup	QF	(Hungary) Senkey	
1934–35	1	NBI	22	13	3	6	63	32	29	3rd	R	Mitropa Cup	QF	(Hungary) Senkey	
1935–36	1	NBI	26	22	4	0	87	21	48	1st	TBD	Mitropa Cup	QF	(Hungary) Schaffer	
1936–37	1	NBI	26	20	3	3	95	34	43	1st	TBD	Mitropa Cup	R16	(Hungary) Schaffer	
1937–38	1	NBI	26	18	4	4	86	32	40	3rd	TBD	Mitropa Cup	R16	(Hungary) Braun	
1938–39	1	NBI	26	18	5	3	74	32	41	3rd	TBD	Mitropa Cup	R16	(Hungary) Braun	
1939–40	1	NBI	26	17	5	4	66	32	39	2nd	TBD	Mitropa Cup	QF	(Hungary) Feldmann	
1940–41	1	NBI	The Hungarian Football Federation suspended the right to play for the club due to the Second Jewish law ^{1}												
1941–42	1	NBI	The Hungarian Football Federation suspended the right to play for the club due to the Second Jewish law ^{1}												
1942–43	1	NBI	The Hungarian Football Federation suspended the right to play for the club due to the Second Jewish law ^{1}												
1943–44	1	NBI	The Hungarian Football Federation suspended the right to play for the club due to the Second Jewish law ^{1}												
1945	1	NBI	22	11	3	8	53	51	25	6th	TBD	Did not qualify		(Hungary) Vágó	
1945–46	1	NBI	18	6	3	9	45	46	15	6th	TBD	Did not qualify		(Hungary) Csapkay, (Hungary) Vágó	
1946–47	1	NBI	30	14	3	13	52	43	31	5th	TBD	Did not qualify		(Hungary) Titkos	
1947–48	1	NBI	32	19	4	9	75	36	42	6th	TBD	Did not qualify		(Hungary) Bukovi	
1948–49	1	NBI	30	18	6	6	91	38	42	2nd	TBD	Did not qualify		(Hungary) Bukovi	
1949–50	1	NBI	30	18	8	4	81	33	44	3rd	TBD	Did not qualify		(Hungary) Bukovi	
1950	1	NBI	15	11	3	2	54	25	24	2nd	TBD	Did not qualify		(Hungary) Bukovi	
1951	1	NBI	26	22	2	2	96	27	46	1st	TBD	Did not qualify		(Hungary) Bukovi	
1952	1	NBI	26	20	5	1	96	33	45	2nd	W	No competition held		(Hungary) Bukovi	
1953	1	NBI	26	22	2	2	92	28	46	1st	TBD	No competition held		(Hungary) Bukovi	
1954	1	NBI	26	16	3	7	82	34	35	2nd	TBD	No competition held		(Hungary) Bukovi	
1955	1	NBI	26	18	5	3	71	29	41	2nd	TBD	European Cup/Mitropa Cup	QF/W	(Hungary) Kemény	
1956	1	NBI	18	10	5	3	41	24	25		TBD	Mitropa Cup	SF	(Hungary) Volentik	
1957	1	NBI	11	8	0	3	31	16	16	2nd	TBD	Mitropa Cup	QF	(Hungary) Volentik	
1957–58	1	NBI	26	15	5	6	51	30	35	1st	TBD	Danube Cup	SF	(Hungary) Bukovi	
1958–59	1	NBI	26	15	4	7	45	26	29	2nd	TBD	Mitropa Cup	F	(Hungary) Bukovi	
1959–60	1	NBI	26	10	9	7	47	35	29	4th	TBD	Mitropa Cup		(Hungary) Hidegkuti	
1960–61	1	NBI	26	13	4	7	53	42	32	3rd	TBD			(Hungary) Szűcs	
1961–62	1	NBI	26	11	6	9	55	44	28	5th	TBD	Inter-Cities Fairs Cup	SF	(Hungary) Szűcs	
1962–63	1	NBI	26	11	9	6	41	32	31	2nd	TBD	Did not qualify		(Hungary) Kovács	
1963	1	NBI	13	4	6	3	16	16	14	7th	TBD	Cup Winners' Cup/Mitropa Cup	F/W	(Hungary) Kovács	
1964	1	NBI	26	11	5	10	42	47	27	7th	TBD	Did not qualify		(Hungary) Kovács, (Hungary) Volentik	
1965	1	NBI	26	7	10	9	30	42	24	8th	TBD	Did not qualify		(Hungary) Lakat	
1966	1	NBI	26	7	6	13	28	49	20	10th	TBD	Did not qualify		(Hungary) Lakat	
1967	1	NBI	26	7	6	13	28	49	20	10th	TBD	Did not qualify		(Hungary) Hidegkuti	
1968	1	NBI	30	7	11	12	35	40	25	11th	W	Did not qualify		(Hungary) Hidegkuti, (Hungary) Kovács	
1969	1	NBI	30	9	8	13	43	53	26	9th	TBD	Cup Winners' Cup	R1	(Hungary) Kovács	
1970	1	NBI	14	8	2	4	19	12	18	4th	TBD	Did not qualify		(Hungary) Palicskó	
1970–71	1	NBI	30	10	13	7	46	35	40	5th	TBD	Did not qualify		(Hungary) Palicskó	
1971–72	1	NBI	30	8	8	14	37	41	22	13th	TBD	Did not qualify		(Hungary) Palicskó	
1972–73	1	NBI	30	8	11	11	36	49	27	9th	TBD	Did not qualify		(Hungary) Bencsik, (Hungary) Kalocsay	
1973–74	1	NBI	30	11	6	13	44	41	28	10th	TBD	Did not qualify		(Hungary) Kalocsay	
1974–75	1	NBI	28	9	7	12	33	39	25	10th	TBD	Did not qualify		(Hungary) Kovács	
1975–76	1	NBI	30	13	3	14	53	41	29	6th	R	Did not qualify		(Hungary) Keszthelyi	
1976–77	1	NBI	34	15	5	14	56	53	35	8th	TBD	Cup Winners' Cup	QF	(Hungary) Keszthelyi	
1977–78	1	NBI	34	18	11	5	57	29	47	3rd	TBD	Did not qualify		(Hungary) Mezey	
1978–79	1	NBI	34	11	8	15	42	50	30	14th	TBD	UEFA Cup	R1	(Hungary) Mezey	
1979–80	1	NBI	34	12	10	12	48	50	34	8th	TBD	Did not qualify		(Hungary) Mezey	
1980–81	1	NBI	34	4	14	16	34	60	22	17th	TBD	Did not qualify		(Hungary) Szentmihályi, (Hungary) Szarvas	
1981–82	2	NBII	?	?	?	?	?	?	44	1st	TBD	Did not qualify		(Hungary)	
1982–83	1	NBI	30	9	8	13	40	58	26	12th	TBD	Did not qualify		(Hungary) Sárosi	
1983–84	1	NBI	30	10	9	11	39	44	29	8th	TBD	Did not qualify		(Hungary) Palicskó	
1984–85	1	NBI	30	11	5	14	44	45	27	14th	TBD	Did not qualify		(Hungary) Palicskó, (Hungary) Makay	
1985–86	1	NBI	30	11	7	12	45	39	29	7th	TBD	Did not qualify		(Hungary) Both	
1986–87	1	NBI	30	17	9	4	52	24	43	1st	TBD	Did not qualify		(Hungary) Verebes	
1987–88	1	NBI	30	14	4	12	53	50	32	6th	TBD	European Cup	R1	(Hungary) Verebes	
1988–89	1	NBI	30	13	11	3	41	34	58	3rd	TBD	Intertoto Cup		(Hungary) Verebes	
1989–90	1	NBI	30	18	4	14	48	26	58	2nd	TBD	UEFA Cup	R1	(Hungary) Verebes	
1990–91	1	NBI	30	10	6	14	38	39	26	10th	TBD	UEFA Cup	R1	(Hungary) Verebes	
1991–92	1	NBI	30	14	7	9	44	34	35	5th	TBD	Did not qualify		(Hungary) Verebes	
1992–93	1	NBI	30	14	8	8	59	37	36	4th	TBD	Did not qualify		(Hungary) Gellei	
1993–94	1	NBI	30	4	9	17	30	58	17	16th	TBD	UEFA Cup	R2	(Hungary) Gellei, (Hungary) Popovics	
1994–95	2	NBII	?	?	?	?	?	?	75	1st	TBD	Did not qualify		(Hungary)	
1995–96	1	NBI	30	13	7	10	58	13	46	5th	TBD	Did not qualify		(Hungary) Bicskei, (Hungary) Kisteleki	
1996–97	1	NBI	34	26	7	1	87	25	85	1st	W	Did not qualify		(Hungary) Garaba, (Hungary) Garami	
1997–98	1	NBI	34	17	7	10	60	35	58	5th	W	Champions League/UEFA Cup	QR2/R2	(Hungary) Garami	
1998–99	1	NBI	34	27	2	5	77	26	83	1st	TBD	Cup Winners' Cup	R1	(Hungary) Egervári	
1999–00	1	NBI	32	18	9	5	64	28	63	2nd	W	Champions League/UEFA Cup	QR2/R2	(Netherlands) Ten Cate	
2000–01	1	NBI	22	8	5	9	31	22	35	6th	TBD	UEFA Cup	R2	(Hungary) Pölöskei	
2001–02	1	NBI	38	21	4	13	62	47	67	3rd	TBD	Did not qualify		(Hungary) Bognár	
2002–03	1	NBI	32	20	6	6	59	34	66	1st	TBD	Did not qualify		(Hungary) Egervári	
2003–04	1	NBI	32	11	10	10	42	40	44	6th	TBD	Champions League/UEFA Cup	QR3/R1	(Hungary) Egervári	
2004–05	1	NBI	30	16	9	5	47	26	56	3rd	TBD	Did not qualify		(Hungary) Garami	
2005–06	1	NBI	30	18	6	6	65	33	60	4th	R16	Did not qualify		(Hungary) Garami	
2006–07	1	NBI	30	19	4	7	61	33	61	2nd	QF	Did not qualify		(Hungary) Garami	
2007–08	1	NBI	30	20	6	4	67	23	66	1st	R32	UEFA Cup	1QR	(Hungary) Garami	
2008–09	1	NBI	30	13	6	11	43	41	45	7th	SF	Champions League	2QR	(Hungary) Garami	
2009–10	1	NBI	30	12	7	11	52	41	43	6th	QF	Did not qualify		(Hungary) Garami	
2010–11	1	NBI	30	8	6	16	35	49	30	15th	QF	Did not qualify		(Hungary) Garami	
2011–12	2	NBII	30	21	6	3	67	20	69	1st	R	Did not qualify		(Hungary) Garami	
2012–13	1	NBI	30	15	6	9	43	30	51	4th	R1	Europa League	1QR	(Hungary) Garami	
2013–14	1	NBI	30	11	7	12	42	36	40	8th	SF	Did not qualify		(Hungary) Garami	
2014–15	1	NBI	30	18	3	9	39	25	57	3rd	R16	Did not qualify		(Hungary) Garami	
2015–16	1	NBI	33	14	9	10	39	37	51	4th	QF	Europa League	1QR	(Hungary) László, (Hungary) Teodoru	
2016–17	1	NBI	33	8	13	12	26	36	37	11th	R32	Europa League	2QR	(Hungary) Teodoru, (Hungary) Tamási	
2017–18	2	NBII ↑	38	26	4	8	88	44	82	1st	QF	Did not qualify		(Hungary) Feczkó	
2018–19	1	NBI	33	10	4	19	42	56	34	11th	R32	Did not qualify		(Hungary) Feczkó, (Hungary) Lucsánszky	
2019–20^{2}	2	NBII ↑	27	18	5	4	60	33	59	1st	SF	Did not qualify		(Germany) Boris	
2020–21	1	NBI	33	11	9	13	44	49	42	7th	SF	Did not qualify		(Germany) Boris	
2021–22	2	NBI ↓	33	9	9	15	28	50	36	11th	R32	Did not qualify		(Germany) Boris, (Italy) Costantino, (Hungary) Theoduro, (Hungary) Márton	
2022–23	2	NBII ↑	38	22	8	8	86	48	74	2nd		Did not qualify		(Hungary) Horváth	
2023–24	1	NBI	33	12	8	13	43	62	44	8th	QF	Did not qualify		(Hungary) Horváth	
2025–26	1	NB I	6	2	1	3	12	13	7	8th	R32	Did not qualify		(Hungary) Horváth, (Hungary) Pinezits	

Notes

- Note 1: In the 1940–41 season the far-right salutations appeared at the stadiums. On 26 June 1940, Brüll, Preiszman, and Fodor retired after a press conference claiming that they cannot do anything for the club after the 1939–40 season due to the cheating of the referees. The MTK declared their dissolution. The Hungarian Football Federation suspended the right to play for the club due to the fact that Burko, a Polish Jew player is still present at the club.
- Note 2: The season was suspended due to the COVID-19 pandemic.

== See also ==
- List of unbeaten football club seasons
