= List of MTK Budapest FC managers =

Magyar Testgyakorlók Köre Budapest Futball Club is a professional football club based in Budapest, Hungary.

== Managers ==
| Manager | Nationality | From | To | P | W | D | L | GF | GA | Win% | Honours | Notes |
|---|---|---|---|---|---|---|---|---|---|---|---|---|
| Sándor Kertész † | Austrian Empire | 1903 | 1907 | | | | | | | | | |
| Hugó Szüsz † | Austrian Empire | 1907 | 1911 | | | | | | | | | |
| John Tait Robertson † | Scotland | 1911 | 1913 | | | | | | | | | |
| William Holmes † | England | 1913 | 1914 | | | | | | | | | |
| Jimmy Hogan † | England | 1 July 1914 | 30 June 1921 | | | | | | | | | |
| Herbert Burgess † | England | 1921 | 1922 | | | | | | | | | |
| Antal Frontz | Hungary | 1922 | 1925 | | | | | | | | | |
| Jimmy Hogan † (2nd spell) | England | 1 December 1925 | 30 June 1927 | | | | | | | | | |
| Gyula Feldmann † | Hungary | 1926 | 1928 | | | | | | | | | |
| Béla Révész † | Hungary | 1928 | 1929 | | | | | | | | | |
| Billy Hibbert † | England | 1930 | 1931 | | | | | | | | | |
| Imre Senkey † | Hungary | 1931 | 1935 | | | | | | | | | |
| Alfréd Schaffer † | Hungary | 1 July 1933 | 30 June 1934 | | | | | | | | | |
| Alfréd Schaffer † (2nd spell) | Hungary | 1 July 1935 | 30 June 1937 | | | | | | | | | |
| József Braun † | Hungary | 1937 | 1939 | | | | | | | | | |
| Gyula Feldmann † | Hungary | 1939 | 1940 | | | | | | | | | |
| Zoltán Vágó | Hungary | 1945 | | | | | | | | | | |
| Károly Csapkay † | Hungary | 1946 | | | | | | | | | | |
| Zoltán Vágó (2nd spell) | Hungary | 1946 | | | | | | | | | | |
| Pál Titkos † | Hungary | 1946 | 1947 | | | | | | | | | |
| Márton Bukovi † | Hungary | 1947 | 1954 | | | | | | | | | |
| Tibor Kemeny † | Hungary | 1 January 1955 | 31 December 1955 | | | | | | | | | |
| Béla Volentik † | Hungary | 1956 | 1957 | | | | | | | | | |
| Márton Bukovi † (2nd spell) | Hungary | 1957 | 1959 | | | | | | | | | |
| Nándor Hidegkuti † | Hungary | 1959 | 1960 | | | | | | | | | |
| Gyula Szűcs † | Hungary | 1 January 1960 | 30 June 1962 | | | | | | | | | |
| Imre Kovács † | Hungary | 1962 | 1964 | | | | | | | | | |
| Béla Volentik † | Hungary | 1964 | | | | | | | | | | |
| Károly Lakat | Hungary | 1965 | 1966 | | | | | | | | | |
| Nándor Hidegkuti † (2nd spell) | Hungary | 1967 | 1968 | | | | | | | | | |
| Ferenc Kovács † | Hungary | 1968 | 1969 | | | | | | | | | |
| Tibor Palicskó † | Hungary | 1970 | 1972 | | | | | | | | | |
| János Bencsik † | Hungary | 1972 | | | | | | | | | | |
| Géza Kalocsay † | Hungary | 1 July 1972 | 30 June 1974 | | | | | | | | | |
| Imre Kovács † | Hungary | 1974 | 1975 | | | | | | | | | |
| Mihály Keszthelyi † | Hungary | 1975 | 1977 | | | | | | | | | |
| György Mezey | Hungary | 1 July 1977 | 30 June 1980 | 9 | 5 | 3 | 1 | | | | | |
| Antal Szentmihályi | Hungary | 1980 | | | | | | | | | | |
| László Szarvas † | Hungary | 1980 | 1981 | | | | | | | | | |
| László Sárosi † | Hungary | 1982 | 1983 | | | | | | | | | |
| Tibor Palicskó † | Hungary | 1983 | 1984 | | | | | | | | | |
| György Makay † | Hungary | 1984 | 1985 | | | | | | | | | |
| József Both | Hungary | 1985 | 1986 | | | | | | | | | |
| József Verebes † | Hungary | 26 August 1986 | 30 June 1992 | 22 | 6 | 3 | 13 | | | | | |
| Imre Gellei | Hungary | 1992 | 1993 | | | | | | | | | |
| Sándor Popovics | Hungary | 1993 | 1994 | | | | | | | | | |
| Bertalan Bicskei † | Hungary | 1995 | 1996 | | | | | | | | | |
| István Kisteleki | Hungary | 1995 | 1996 | | | | | | | | | |
| Imre Garaba | Hungary | 1996 | | | | | | | | | | |
| József Garami † | Hungary | 1 July 1996 | 30 June 1998 | 63 | 41 | 13 | 9 | | | | | |
| Sándor Egervári | Hungary | 1 July 1998 | 30 June 1999 | 51 | 35 | 4 | 12 | | | | | |
| Henk ten Cate | Netherlands | 1 July 1999 | 30 June 2000 | 42 | 24 | 11 | 7 | | | | | |
| Gábor Pölöskei | Hungary | 1 July 2000 | 30 June 2001 | | | | | | | | | |
| György Bognár | Hungary | 2 May 2001 | 24 April 2002 | 34 | 21 | 4 | 9 | 66 | 38 | | | |
| Sándor Egervári (2nd spell) | Hungary | 1 July 2002 | 30 June 2004 | 20 | 6 | 7 | 7 | | | | | |
| József Garami † (2nd spell) | Hungary | 1 July 2004 | 2015 | 366 | 187 | 73 | 106 | | | 51.09 | 2003–04 Nemzeti Bajnokság I, 2007–08 Nemzeti Bajnokság I | |
| Csaba László | Hungary | 3 June 2015 | 3 February 2016 | 24 | 9 | 7 | 8 | 31 | 24 | | | |
| Vaszilisz Teodoru | Hungary | 3 February 2016 | 20 December 2016 | 40 | 13 | 14 | 14 | 38 | 45 | | | |
| Zsolt Tamási | Hungary | 20 December 2016 | 30 May 2017 | 14 | 4 | 5 | 5 | 14 | 15 | | | |
| Tamás Feczkó | Hungary | 9 June 2017 | 10 March 2019 | 24 | 9 | 4 | 11 | 34 | 37 | 37.5 | | |
| Tamás Lucsánszky | Hungary | 11 March 2019 | 30 May 2019 | 9 | 1 | 0 | 8 | 8 | 19 | 11.12 | | |
| Michael Boris | Germany | 30 May 2019 | 18 May 2021 | 75 | 41 | 15 | 19 | 148 | 93 | 54.05 | | |
| Giovanni Costantino | Italy | 18 May 2021 | 4 October 2021 | 9 | 4 | 1 | 4 | 16 | 11 | 44.45 | | |
| Vaszilisz Teodoru (2nd spell) | Hungary | 4 October 2021 | 12 November 2021 | 5 | 0 | 2 | 3 | 2 | 9 | 0 | | |
| Gábor Márton | Hungary | 12 November 2021 | 23 April 2022 | 17 | 3 | 5 | 9 | 9 | 32 | | | |
| György Bognár (2nd spell) | Hungary | 17 May 2022 | 23 October 2022 | 15 | 8 | 3 | 4 | 49 | 23 | | | |
| Dávid Horváth | Hungary | 24 October 2022 | 19 December 2025 | 30 | 17 | 7 | 6 | | | | | |
| Máté Pinezits | Hungary | 1 January 2026 | 3 November 2026 | | | | | | | | | |
| Imre Szabics | | 16 November 2026 | present | | | | | | | | | |
