= MTK Budapest =

Sports club in Budapest, Hungary

- Full name: Magyar Testgyakorlók Köre Budapest
- Short name: MTK
- Founded: 16 November 1888; 137 years ago
- Colours: Blue and white
- Chairman: Tamás Deutsch
- Website: www.mtk.hu

Magyar Testgyakorlók Köre (Hungarian for "Hungarian Circle of Physical Practitioners") is a multi-sports club from Budapest, founded in 1888. It has sections for football, handball, basketball, volleyball, futsal, ice hockey, water polo, cycling, gymnastics, athletics, fencing, canoeing, boxing, wrestling, swimming, rowing, karate, taekwondo, sailing, speed skating, skiing, table tennis, tennis and chess.

== Departments ==
=== Team sports ===
- Football:
  - men's football (since 1888)
  - women's football (since 2004)
- Handball:
  - women's handball (1946–1975, 1993–2000, since 2013)
- Basketball:
  - women's handball (1945–1997, since 2011)
- Volleyball:
  - women's volleyball (since 1947)

=== Individual sports ===
- Athletics (since 1888)
- Boxing (1893–1914, 1922– , since 1951)
- Bridge (since 1933)
- Canoeing (since 1951)
- Chess
- Gymnastics
- Fencing (since 1908)
- Judo (since 2019)
- Karate (since 2010)
- Rowing (1895–1942, since 1947)
- Rhythmic gymnastics (since 2011)
- Swimming (1892–1958, since 1962)
- Skating
- Taekwondo (since 1989)
- Tennis (1930–, 1947–, since 1991)
- E-sports

=== Dissolved departments ===
- Auto-motor (1926–1953)
- Bandy
- Basketball
  - men's basketball
- Button football
- Cycling
- Field hockey
- Futsal
- Handball
  - men's handball (1924–1958)
- Ice hockey
- Sailing
- Skiing
- Water polo
- Weightlifting (1934–?, 195?–?, 196?–1966)
- Wrestling

== Supporters and rivalries ==
=== Supporters ===
==== Notable supporters ====
- Sándor Demján, businessman and entrepreneur
- Károly Gesztesi, actor
- Zoltán Zelk, poet
- Gábor Várszegi, musician and businessman

=== Rivalry ===
The fixture between MTK Budapest FC and Ferencvárosi TC is called the Örökrangadó or Eternal derby. The first fixture was played in the 1903 Nemzeti Bajnokság I season. It is the oldest football rivalry in Hungary.

== Honours ==
=== Active departments ===
==== Football (men's) ====
- Hungarian Championship
  - Winners (23): 1904, 1907–08, 1913–14, 1916–17, 1917–18, 1918–19, 1919–20, 1920–21, 1921–22, 1922–23, 1923–24, 1924–25, 1928–29, 1935–36, 1936–37, 1950, 1953, 1957–58, 1986–87, 1996–97, 1998–99, 2002–03, 2007–08
- Hungarian Second League
  - Winners (4): 1994–95, 2011–12, 2017–18, 2019–20
- Hungarian Cup
  - Winners (12): 1909–10, 1910–11, 1911–12, 1913–14, 1922–23, 1924–25, 1931–32, 1951–52, 1968, 1996–97, 1997–98, 1999–00
- Hungarian Super Cup (defunct)
  - Winners (2): 2003, 2008
- Hungarian League Cup (defunct)
  - Winners (2): 2012–13, 2014–15
- Mitropa Cup (defunct)
  - Winners (2): 1955, 1963
- Štefánik Tournament (defunct)
  - Winner (1): 1933

==== Basketball (women's) ====
- Hungarian Championship
  - Winners (10): 1953, 1956, 1961–62, 1962–63, 1964, 1965, 1966, 1968, 1969, 1972, 1988–89, 1990–91
- Hungarian Cup
  - Winners (8): 1955, 1961–62, 1964, 1965, 1967, 1968, 1969, 1972

==== Football (women's) ====
- Hungarian Championship
  - Winners (8): 2004–05, 2009–10, 2010–11, 2011–12, 2012–13, 2013–14, 2016–17, 2017–18
- Hungarian Cup
  - Winners (4): 2005, 2010, 2013, 2014

=== International honours ===
season	men's football	women's basketball
1955	Mitropa Cup Winners	
1959	Mitropa Cup Final	
1961–62	Inter-Cities Fairs Cup Semi-finals	
1962–63	Mitropa Cup Winners	European Cup Semi-finals
1963–64	Cup Winners' Cup Final	

== Notable former players ==
=== Olympic champions ===
Az MTK olimpiai bajnokainak listája

- Zoltán Halmay, swimming
- Richárd Weisz, wrestling (Greco-Roman)
- Márton Homonnai, water polo
- Ferenc Keserű, water polo
- Jenő Brandi, water polo
- Kálmán Hazai, water polo
- László Papp, boxing
- Imre Hódos, wrestling (Greco-Roman)
- Róbert Antal, water polo
- Nándor Hidegkuti, football
- Imre Kovács, football
- Mihály Lantos, football
- Péter Palotás, football
- József Zakariás, football
- Gyula Török, boxing
- Lajos Dunai, football
- István Sárközi, football
- Ildikó Tordasi, fencing (foil)
- Botond Storcz, canoe sprint
- Katalin Kovács, canoe sprint

== Presidents ==
List of the presidents of the MTK Budapest:

- 1889–1891: Lajos Vermes
- 1892–1898: Gyula Porzsolt
- 1899–1903: Antal Heteés
- 1905–1944: Alfréd Brüll
- 1945–1949: Zoltán Vass
- 1951–1953: János Somogyi
- 1953–1954: Lajos Kovács
- 1954–1956: István Tóth
- 1959–1963: István Dénes
- 1963–1969: Ferenc Bánhalmi
- 1969–1971: György Krekács
- 1971–2000: János Fekete
- 2001–2002: István Harcsár
- 2002–2003: Csaba Szecső
- 2004–2010: György Hunvald
- since 2010: Tamás Deutsch
