= 2015–16 Nemzeti Bajnokság I =

NB I
- Season: 2015–16
- Dates: 18 July 2015 – 30 April 2016
- Champions: Ferencváros
- Relegated: Puskás Akadémia; Békéscsaba
- Champions League: Ferencváros
- Europa League: Videoton; Debrecen; MTK Budapest
- Matches: 198
- Goals: 483 (2.44 per match)
- Top goalscorer: Dániel Böde (17 goals)
- Biggest home win: Debrecen 7–0 Békéscsaba (17 October 2015)
- Biggest away win: Paks 0–5 Ferencváros (5 December 2015)
- Highest scoring: Debrecen 7–0 Békéscsaba (17 October 2015); Ferencváros 5–2 Paks (6 April 2016)
- Longest winning run: 9 games Ferencváros
- Longest unbeaten run: 14 games Ferencváros
- Longest winless run: 9 games Újpest; Puskás Akadémia
- Longest losing run: 5 games Vasas
- Highest attendance: 17,489; Ferencváros 0-1 Újpest (12 December 2015)
- Lowest attendance: 316; MTK 1–0 Békéscsaba (27 February 2016)
- Total attendance: 515,281
- Average attendance: 2,602
- All statistics correct as of 30 April 2016.

The 2015–16 Nemzeti Bajnokság I, also known as NB I, is the 117th season of top-tier football in Hungary. The league is officially named OTP Bank Liga for sponsorship reasons. The season began 17 July 2015 and will conclude on 8 May 2016. Videoton are the defending champions having won their second Hungarian championship last season.

Last season an extra four teams were relegated to the Nemzeti Bajnokság III. Győr had financial and licensing issues. Kecskemét, Pécs and Nyíregyháza all had licensing issues. Therefore, from this season twelve teams compete for the championship title, playing 33 rounds. This season was played with 12 teams after reduced from 16 in 2014–15.

== Teams ==
Dunaújváros and Pápa finished the 2014–15 season in the last two places and thus were relegated to NB II division.

The two relegated teams were replaced with the champions and the runners-up 2014–15 NB II Vasas and Békéscsaba. Each of the first two teams in the first division.

=== Stadium and locations ===
Location of teams in 2015–16 Nemzeti Bajnokság I
Location of Budapest teams

Following is the list of clubs competing in 2015–16 Nemzeti Bajnokság I, with their location, stadium and stadium capacity.

Team	Location	Stadium	Capacity	Ref
Békéscsaba	Békéscsaba	Kórház utcai Stadion	4,965	
Debrecen	Debrecen	Nagyerdei Stadion	20,340	
Diósgyőr	Miskolc	Diósgyőri Stadion	9,345	
Ferencváros	Budapest (Ferencváros)	Groupama Aréna	23,700	
Haladás	Szombathely	Rohonci úti Stadion	12,500	
Honvéd	Budapest (Kispest)	Bozsik József Stadion	10,000	
MTK	Budapest (Józsefváros)	Illovszky Rudokf Stadion	9,000	
Paks	Paks	Fehérvári úti Stadion	6,150	
Puskás Akadémia	Felcsút	Pancho Aréna	3,816	
Újpest	Budapest (Újpest)	Szusza Ferenc Stadion	13,501	
Vasas	Budapest (Angyalföld)	Illovszky Rudokf Stadion	9,000	
Videoton	Székesfehérvár	Sóstói Stadion	14,135	

Békéscsaba	Debrecen	Diósgyőr	Ferencváros
Kórház utcai Stadion	Nagyerdei Stadion; UEFA Elite Stadium	Diósgyőri Stadion	Groupama Aréna; UEFA Elite Stadium
Capacity: 4,965	Capacity: 20,340	Capacity: 9,345	Capacity: 23,700
Haladás	Honvéd	MTK	Paks
Rohonci úti Stadion	Bozsik József Stadion	Illovszky Rudolf Stadion	Fehérvári úti Stadion
Capacity: 12,500	Capacity: 10,000	Capacity: 9,000	Capacity: 6,150
Puskás Akadémia	Újpest	Vasas	Videoton
Pancho Aréna; UEFA Elite Stadium	Szusza Ferenc Stadion	Illovszky Rudolf Stadion	Sóstói Stadion
Capacity: 3,816	Capacity: 13,501	Capacity: 9,000	Capacity: 14,135

=== Personnel and kits ===
Following is the list of clubs competing in 2015–16 Nemzeti Bajnokság I, with their manager, captain, kit manufacturer and shirt sponsor.
Note: Flags indicate national team as has been defined under FIFA eligibility rules. Players and Managers may hold more than one non-FIFA nationality.

Team	Manager		Captain		Kit manufacturer	Shirt sponsor
Team		Name		Name	Kit manufacturer	Shirt sponsor
Békéscsaba	(Serbia)	Zoran Spisljak	(Hungary)	Zsolt Balog	adidas	Békés Drén
Debrecen	(Hungary)	Elemér Kondás	(Hungary)	Péter Szakály	adidas	TEVA
Diósgyőr	(Hungary)	Sándor Egervári	(Hungary)	Vladimir Koman	Nike	Borsodi
Ferencváros	(Germany)	Thomas Doll	(Hungary)	Gábor Gyömbér	Nike	T-Mobile
Haladás	(Hungary)	Géza Mészöly	(Hungary)	Péter Halmosi	adidas	Swietelsky
Honvéd	(Italy)	Marco Rossi	(Hungary)	Szabolcs Kemenes	Macron	–
MTK	(Hungary)	Vaszilisz Teodoru	(Hungary)	József Kanta	Nike	Panzi Pet
Paks	(Hungary)	Aurél Csertői	(Hungary)	Tamás Báló	Jako	–
Puskás Akadémia	(Croatia)	Robert Jarni	(Hungary)	Attila Polonkai	Jako	Mészáros és Mészáros Kft.
Újpest	(Serbia)	Nebojša Vignjević	(Hungary)	Szabolcs Balajcza	Puma	–
Vasas	(Germany)	Michael Oenning	(Hungary)	Mohamed Remili	adidas	Alprosys
Videoton	(Hungary)	Ferenc Horváth	(Hungary)	Roland Juhász	adidas	Máltai Szeretetszolgálat

==== Managerial changes ====
Team	Outgoing manager	Manner of departure	Date of vacancy	Position in table	Replaced by	Date of appointment
Diósgyőr	(Hungary) Zoltán Vitelki	Caretaker	End of 2014–15 season	Pre-season	(Hungary) Balázs Bekő	14 May 2015
Puskás Akadémia	(Hungary) Miklós Benczés	End of contract	1 June 2015	Pre-season	(Croatia) Robert Jarni	8 June 2015
MTK	(Hungary) József Garami	End of term and he will be technical director.	3 June 2015	Pre-season	(Hungary) Csaba László	3 June 2015
Videoton	(Spain) Joan Carrillo	Contract terminated	3 June 2015	Pre-season	(France) Bernard Casoni	11 June 2015
Videoton	(France) Bernard Casoni	Sacked	19 August 2015	10th	(Hungary) Tamás Pető (caretaker)	19 August 2015
Videoton	(Hungary) Tamás Pető	End of caretaker appointment	19 August 2015	7th	(Hungary) Ferenc Horváth	6 October 2015
Vasas	(Hungary) Károly Szanyó	Sacked	19 October 2015	11th	(Hungary) Antal Simon	19 October 2015
Diósgyőr	(Hungary) Balázs Bekő	Sacked	14 December 2015	9th	(Hungary) Sándor Egervári	29 December 2015
Vasas	(Hungary) Antal Simon	End of contract	31 December 2015	10th	(Germany) Michael Oenning	1 January 2016
MTK	(Hungary) Csaba László	Contract terminated	3 February 2016	5th	(Hungary) Vaszilisz Teodoru	3 February 2016
Puskás Akadémia	(Croatia) Robert Jarni	Contract terminated	16 April 2016	12th	(Hungary) István Szijjártó	16 April 2016

== League table ==
Pos	Team	Pld	W	D	L	GF	GA	GD	Pts	Qualification or relegation
1	Ferencváros (C)	33	24	4	5	69	23	+46	76	Qualification for the Champions League second qualifying round
2	Videoton	33	17	4	12	42	29	+13	55	Qualification for the Europa League first qualifying round (Note: Since the winners of the 2015–16 Magyar Kupa, Ferencváros, qualified for European competition based on league position, the spot awarded to the cup winners (Europa League first qualifying round) was passed to the fourth-placed team.)
3	Debrecen	33	14	11	8	48	34	+14	53	Qualification for the Europa League first qualifying round
4	MTK Budapest	33	14	9	10	39	37	+2	51	Qualification for the Europa League first qualifying round
5	Haladás	33	13	11	9	33	37	−4	50	
6	Újpest	33	11	13	9	42	37	+5	46	
7	Paks	33	12	7	14	41	40	+1	43	
8	Honvéd	33	12	7	14	40	39	+1	43	
9	Diósgyőr	33	10	8	15	37	47	−10	38	
10	Vasas	33	9	5	19	32	54	−22	32	
11	Puskás Akadémia (R)	33	7	10	16	35	51	−16	31	Relegation to the Nemzeti Bajnokság II
12	Békéscsaba (R)	33	6	9	18	25	55	−30	27	Relegation to the Nemzeti Bajnokság II

Source: Soccerway
Rules for classification: 1) Points; 2) Matches won; 3) Goal difference; 4) Goals scored; 5) Head-to-head points; 6) Head-to-head goal difference; 7) Head-to-head away goals scored; 8) Fairplay; 9) Draw.
(C) Champions; (R) Relegated

=== Positions by round ===
Team ╲ Round	1	2	3	4	5	6	7	8	9	10	11	12	13	14	15	16	17	18	19	20	21	22	23	24	25	26	27	28	29	30	31	32	33
Ferencváros	1	1	1	1	1	1	1	1	1	1	1	1	1	1	1	1	1	1	1	1	1	1	1	1	1	1	1	1	1	1	1	1	1
Videoton	10	10	9	10	10	11	11	11	10	11	7	7	7	6	6	4	7	5	3	5	5	5	3	3	5	4	5	4	5	4	3	2	2
Debrecen	2	5	4	7	4	8	8	6	4	5	6	2	5	5	4	6	5	7	7	4	3	3	2	2	4	5	3	5	3	3	4	3	3
MTK	5	6	6	3	7	4	3	3	3	4	4	4	3	4	3	3	3	3	5	7	6	7	6	4	2	2	2	2	2	2	2	4	4
Haladás	12	8	8	6	2	3	2	2	2	2	2	5	4	3	5	7	6	6	6	3	4	4	5	6	7	7	8	6	6	5	5	5	5
Újpest	7	4	2	2	3	5	5	7	8	8	9	9	9	7	7	5	4	4	2	2	2	2	4	5	3	3	4	3	4	6	6	6	6
Paks	6	3	5	4	6	6	7	5	6	6	3	3	2	2	2	2	2	2	4	6	7	6	7	7	6	6	6	7	7	7	8	8	7
Honvéd	4	2	3	5	5	2	4	4	5	3	5	6	6	8	8	8	8	8	8	8	8	8	8	8	8	8	7	8	8	9	7	7	8
Diósgyőr	3	7	10	11	12	10	9	10	7	7	8	8	8	9	9	9	9	9	9	9	9	9	9	9	9	9	9	9	9	8	9	9	9
Vasas	9	11	11	9	8	9	10	9	11	10	11	11	11	11	12	12	11	11	10	11	10	10	10	11	11	11	10	10	10	10	11	10	10
Puskás Akadémia	11	9	7	8	9	7	6	8	9	9	10	10	10	10	10	10	10	10	11	10	11	11	11	10	10	10	11	11	11	12	10	11	11
Békéscsaba	8	12	12	12	11	12	12	12	12	12	12	12	12	12	11	11	12	12	12	12	12	12	12	12	12	12	12	12	12	11	12	12	12

Updated to match(es) played on 20 April 2016. Source: mlsz.hu (in Hungarian)
= Leader; = 2016–17 UEFA Europa League First qualifying round; = Relegation to 2016–17 Nemzeti Bajnokság II

== Results ==
In the first 22 rounds every team plays against each other home-and-away in a round-robin format. In the remaining 11 rounds, the first six placed team from the previous season will play six matches at home and five matches away, and the other six teams will play five matches at home and six matches away.

=== Rounds 1–22 ===
Home \ Away	BÉK	DEB	DIÓ	FTC	HAL	HON	MTK	PAK	PUS	UTE	VAS	VID
Békéscsaba	—	2–3	1–1	0–1	0–1	1–4	1–1	2–3	2–1	1–3	0–2	2–0
Debrecen	7–0	—	1–0	0–3	0–1	0–0	3–1	2–0	1–1	1–1	4–0	1–2
Diósgyőr	2–0	0–2	—	0–2	1–1	2–1	1–1	1–1	3–2	2–1	2–1	1–2
Ferencváros	1–0	3–0	3–1	—	3–1	2–1	2–0	2–0	2–0	0–1	5–1	1–0
Haladás	1–1	2–2	2–1	0–2	—	0–0	2–2	1–0	2–1	0–3	1–1	1–0
Honvéd	3–2	3–3	2–1	2–1	0–1	—	2–1	0–0	0–0	1–2	0–1	1–0
MTK	0–0	1–0 (Note: This match played in the 26th round (20 March 2016))	5–0	1–0	0–1	2–1	—	1–0	1–0	2–1 (Note: This match played in the 23rd round (5 March 2016))	2–1	1–0
Paks	4–0	1–1	1–1	0–5	2–0	3–1	0–0	—	4–2	1–0	3–0	2–0
Puskás Akadémia	1–2	1–1	1–0	0–0	1–1	0–3	2–3	1–0	—	1–1	1–0	0–1
Újpest	2–0	1–1	2–1	1–2	0–0	1–1	2–2	0–0	2–2	—	2–0	1–0
Vasas	4–0	0–1	0–1	0–2	1–0	2–1	0–1	1–2	2–4	1–3	—	2–1
Videoton	1–1	1–0	2–1	1–3	0–1	3–0	1–0	1–0	3–2	3–0	2–0	—

Source: mlsz.hu (in Hungarian)
Legend: Blue = home team win; Yellow = draw; Red = away team win.

=== Rounds 23–33 ===
Home \ Away	BÉK	DEB	DIÓ	FTC	HAL	HON	MTK	PAK	PUS	UTE	VAS	VID
Békéscsaba	—	0–0	0–0	0–1	—	—	—	—	—	1–0	1–1	—
Debrecen	—	—	3–1	2–1	—	0–3	3–1 (Note: This match played in the 19th round (12 December 2015))	—	4–2	1–0	—	—
Diósgyőr	—	—	—	—	3–0	1–2	—	0–2	2–1	—	—	2–1
Ferencváros	—	—	2–2	—	—	2–1	2–2	5–2	4–0	2–2	—	—
Haladás	1–0	2–2	—	0–1	—	—	—	—	—	1–1	2–1	—
Honvéd	2–1	—	—	—	0–1	—	—	2–0	—	—	0–0	2–1
MTK	3–0	—	0–0	—	3–1	1–0	—	—	0–1	—	0–2	—
Paks	0–2	0–1	—	—	2–3	—	4–1	—	—	—	2–0	0–1
Puskás Akadémia	0–1	—	—	—	1–1	2–1	—	2–1	—	—	—	0–0
Újpest	—	—	1–0	—	—	2–0	1–1 (Note: This match played in the 21st round (20 February 2016))	1–1	2–2	—	—	0–3
Vasas	—	0–0	1–3	1–4	—	—	—	—	1–0	3–2	—	—
Videoton	1–1	1–0	—	1–0	2–1	—	5–0	—	—	—	2–2	—

Source: mlsz.hu (in Hungarian)
Legend: Blue = home team win; Yellow = draw; Red = away team win.

== Season statistics ==
=== Top goalscorers ===
Rank	Player	Club	Goals
1	(Hungary) Dániel Böde	Ferencváros	17
2	(Senegal) Mbaye Diagne	Újpest	11
2	(Hungary) Sándor Torghelle	MTK	11
4	(Bosnia and Herzegovina) Đorđe Kamber	Honvéd	9
4	(Slovakia) Stanislav Šesták	Ferencváros	9
6	(Hungary) Soma Novothny	Diósgyőr	8
7	(Hungary) Bálint Gaál	Haladás	7
7	(Hungary) Ádám Gyurcsó	Videoton	7
7	(Hungary) János Hahn	Paks	7
7	(Hungary) József Kanta	MTK	7
7	(Belgium) Roland Lamah	Ferencváros	7
7	(Hungary) Márió Németh	Haladás	7
7	(Hungary) László Pekár	Puskás Akadémia	7
7	(Hungary) Roland Varga	Ferencváros	7
13	(North Macedonia) Enis Bardhi	Újpest	6
13	(Hungary) Zsolt Horváth	Debrecen	6
13	(France) Loïc Nego	Videoton	6
13	(Hungary) András Radó	Ferencváros	6
13	(Hungary) Mohamed Remili	Vasas	6
13	(Hungary) Tibor Tisza	Debrecen	6

Updated to games played on 30 April 2016

=== Hat-tricks ===
Name	For	Against	Round	Result	Date
(Hungary) Zsolt Horváth	Debrecen	MTK	19th	3–1	12 December 2015

== Attendances ==
Pos	Team	Total	High	Low	Average	Change
1	Ferencváros	120,270	17,489	4,858	7,517	−10.3%
2	Diósgyőr	52,818	8,165	1,911	3,521	−18.8%
3	Debrecen	47,884	6,241	1,285	2,993	−21.6%
4	Újpest	46,073	8,445	1,048	2,880	+21.6%
5	Haladás	40,618	4,395	1,117	2,708	+25.4%
6	Videoton	31,879	5,020	1,006	1,992	−41.1%
7	Békéscsaba	28,252	3,754	632	1,883	+21.7%^{1}
8	Vasas	27,481	3,452	900	1,832	+2.5%^{1}
9	Honvéd	26,086	2,820	500	1,739	+78.0%
10	Puskás Akadémia	23,572	3,798	708	1,571	−4.7%
11	Paks	21,030	4,113	624	1,314	−9.3%
12	MTK	12,227	2,114	316	764	+9.3%^{2}
	League total	478,190	17,489	316	2,571	+2.7%

Updated to games played on 20 April 2016
Source: League matches: NB I 2015/2016, NB I 2015/2016: attendances, NB II 2014/2015: attendances
Notes:
1: Team played last season in NB II
2: MTK play their home matches in Illovszky Rudolf Stadion, because Hidegkuti Nándor stadion is under reconstruction

== Number of teams by counties ==
	County	No. teams	Teams
1	Budapest (capital)	5	Ferencváros, Honvéd, MTK, Újpest and Vasas
2	Fejér	2	Puskás Akadémia and Videoton
3	Békés	1	Békéscsaba
3	Borsod-Abaúj-Zemplén	1	Diósgyőr
3	Hajdú-Bihar	1	Debrecen
3	Tolna	1	Paks
3	Vas	1	Haladás

== Best players ==
After the season Magyar Labdarúgó Szövetség chose the best players of this season.

- The best player: Zoltán Gera (Ferencváros)
- The best discovered player of this season: Ádám Nagy (Ferencváros)
- The best manager: Thomas Doll (Ferencváros)
- The best referee: Viktor Kassai
- Fair Play: Debreceni VSC
- The most aesthetically significant, or "most beautiful", goal of NB1 (Audience Award): Dániel Böde (Ferencváros)

== See also ==
- 2015–16 Magyar Kupa
- 2015–16 Nemzeti Bajnokság II
- 2015–16 Nemzeti Bajnokság III
