= Tamás Hajnal =

Hungarian footballer (born 1981)

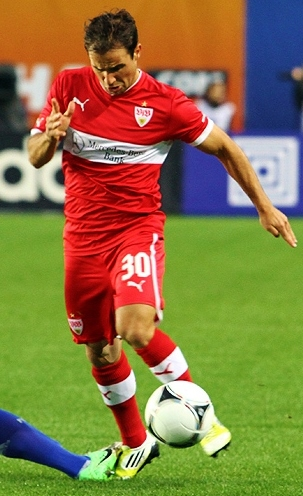
- Hajnal playing for Stuttgart

Personal information
- Date of birth: 15 March 1981 (age 45)
- Place of birth: Esztergom, Hungary
- Height: 1.68 m (5 ft 6 in)
- Position: Attacking midfielder

Youth career
- 1985–1990: Zoltek SE Nyergesujfalu
- 1990–1997: Ferencváros

Senior career*
Years	Team	Apps	(Gls)
1997	Ferencváros	2	(0)
1997	Dunakanyar-Vác FC	0	(0)
1998–2004	Schalke 04	8	(0)
1999–2002	→ Schalke 04 II	72	(28)
2004–2006	Sint-Truiden	50	(11)
2006–2007	1. FC Kaiserslautern	32	(7)
2007–2008	Karlsruher SC	32	(8)
2008–2010	Borussia Dortmund	51	(5)
2009–2010	→ Borussia Dortmund II	2	(0)
2011–2013	VfB Stuttgart	58	(4)
2013–2014	FC Ingolstadt 04	9	(1)
2015–2018	Ferencváros	50	(7)
Total		366	(71)

International career
1996–1997	Hungary U16	18	(4)
1998–1999	Hungary U17	2	(1)
1998–2000	Hungary U18	6	(1)
1999–2000	Hungary U21	4	(0)
2004–2013	Hungary	59	(7)
- * Club domestic league appearances and goals

Tamás Hajnal (Hungarian pronunciation: [ˈtɒmaːʃ ˈhɒjnɒl]; born 15 March 1981) is a Hungarian former professional footballer who played as an attacking midfielder.

== Club career ==
Born in Esztergom, Hungary, Hajnal started playing football at the local Zoltek SE in his hometown Nyergesújfalu.

=== Ferencváros and Dunakanyar Vác FC ===
At the age of nine, Hajnal joined Ferencváros. He played two matches in the Hungarian National Championship I for Ferencváros. In the same year, he moved to Dunakanyar-Vác FC as part of an exchange deal. He did not play any matches in the Dunakanyar-Vác FC. Next year he headed for the German Bundesliga.

=== Schalke 04 ===
Dunakanyar-Vác FC made a lot of money by quickly selling him to Schalke 04. He found it hard to make the breakthrough with the Royal Blues, and after a mere seven Bundesliga appearances he moved to Belgium in 2004.

=== Sint-Truiden ===
He joined Sint-Truidense V.V. in 2004. In the 2004–05 Belgian First Division season he scored six goals in 29 matches. In the next season he played 20 matches and scored five goals.

=== 1. FC Kaiserslautern ===
In 2006, Hajnal moved to the Bundesliga to join 1. FC Kaiserslautern. He played 32 matches and scored seven goals in the 2006–07 2. Bundesliga season.

=== Karlsruher SC ===
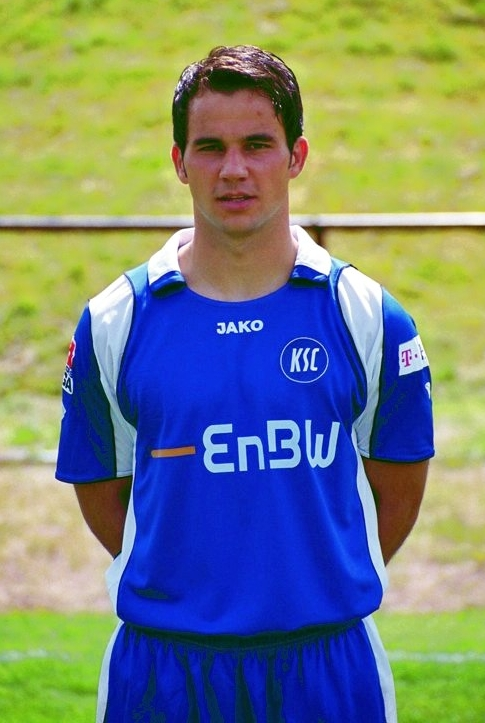
Hajnal Tamás wearing the Karlsruher SC's shirt

In 2007, Hajnal transferred to Karlsruher SC. He played 32 matches and scored eight goals in the 2007–08 Bundesliga season.

=== Borussia Dortmund ===
In July 2008, he moved to Borussia Dortmund for a fixed transfer fee of €1.3 million.

His performance in Dortmund's 4–0 win against Frankfurt on 15 November 2008—scoring once and assists for three goals—earned him a place in the Bundesliga Team of the Week and made Hajnal Man of The Match. In the next round, Hajnal was again in the Team of the Week. He played 30 matches and scored five goals during the 2008–09 Bundesliga season. In the 2009–10 Bundesliga season he played 21 matches. He was injured in 2010, therefore he could not play in the 2010–11 Bundesliga season for Borussia Dortmund.

=== VfB Stuttgart ===
On 31 January 2011, Hajnal was loaned out to VfB Stuttgart. He scored his first goal against Eintracht Frankfurt on 27 February 2011. The final result was 2–0 for Stuttgart. On 7 May 2011, Hajnal moved permanently to VfB Stuttgart because the club avoided relegation.

Hajnal extended his contract with VfB Stuttgart on 7 January 2013 until June 2014 with an option for a further year.

=== FC Ingolstadt 04 ===
On 1 August 2013, he moved to FC Ingolstadt 04. He made his debut in the 2. Bundesliga against Karlsruher SC. In September 2014 he announced he would be leaving the club, and likely returning to his native Hungary.

=== Ferencváros ===
On 12 December 2014, Hajnal returned to his former club Ferencváros after 17 years. Current manager of Ferencváros, Thomas Doll had been interested in signing Hajnal previously. However, Hajnal was unaware that Ferencváros intended to sign him a couple of weeks before the offer was made. When Hajnal was a free agent, he was training with Ferencváros. Therefore, it was obvious that he would join the club if he would return to Hungary.

On 7 March 2015, Hajnal scored his first goal in the 57th minute in the 2014–15 season of the Hungarian League against Győr at the Groupama Arena in Budapest.

== International career ==
On 9 October 2004, Hajnal played his first match for Hungary in Solna against Sweden and on 17 October 2007, he scored his first international goal in a friendly match against Poland. The final result was 1–0 to Hungary. Hungary finished a disappointing sixth in their qualifying group for UEFA Euro 2008 and have been out of the running for a place in Austria and Switzerland next year since the beginning of the qualification period. The competition from Greece, Norway and Turkey was simply too strong for Hajnal and his teammates, who nevertheless beat Bosnia-Herzegovina home and away during the campaign. Hajnal scored twice against Montenegro in the Puskás Ferenc Stadium in a friendly match. The final result was 3–3. During the FIFA World Cup 2010 qualifying he scored against Malta in Budapest. The final result was 3–0. This goal was the first goal scored in a qualifier. During the management of Sándor Egervári (2010–present), Hajnal played his first match in the Wembley Stadium against England. Hajnal scored a goal against Azerbaijan on 9 February 2011. Hungary defeated Azerbaijan 2–0 in a friendly match.

== Career statistics ==
=== Club ===
Appearances and goals by club, season and competition
Club	Season	League			Cup		Europe		Total	
Club	Season	Division	Apps	Goals	Apps	Goals	Apps	Goals	Apps	Goals
Ferencváros	1996–97	Nemzeti Bajnokság I	2	0	0	0	0	0	2	0
Vác	1997–98	Nemzeti Bajnokság I	0	0	0	0	0	0	0	0
Schalke 04	1997–98	Bundesliga	0	0	0	0	0	0	0	0
Schalke 04	1998–99	Bundesliga	0	0	0	0	0	0	0	0
Schalke 04	1999–00	Bundesliga	8	0	0	0	0	0	8	0
Schalke 04	Total		8	0	0	0	0	0	8	0
Schalke 04 ll	2000–01	Regionalliga	28	9	0	0	0	0	28	9
Schalke 04 ll	2001–02	Regionalliga	29	11	1	0	0	0	30	11
Schalke 04 ll	2002–03	Regionalliga	32	13	0	0	0	0	32	13
Schalke 04 ll	2003–04	Regionalliga	15	8	0	0	0	0	15	8
Schalke 04 ll	Total		104	41	1	0	0	0	105	41
Sint Truiden	2004–05	Belgian First Division	30	6	0	0	0	0	30	6
Sint Truiden	2005–06	Belgian First Division	20	5	0	0	0	0	20	5
Sint Truiden	Total		50	11	0	0	0	0	50	11
1. FC Kaiserslautern	2006–07	2. Bundesliga	32	7	2	1	0	0	34	8
Karlsruher SC	2007–08	Bundesliga	32	8	2	0	0	0	34	8
Borussia Dortmund	2008–09	Bundesliga	30	5	3	1	2	2	35	8
Borussia Dortmund	2009–10	Bundesliga	21	0	2	0	0	0	23	0
Borussia Dortmund	2010–11	Bundesliga	0	0	0	0	0	0	0	0
Borussia Dortmund	Total		51	5	5	1	2	2	58	8
VfB Stuttgart	2010–11	Bundesliga	12	3	0	0	2	0	14	3
VfB Stuttgart	2011–12	Bundesliga	33	1	3	0	0	0	36	1
VfB Stuttgart	2012–13	Bundesliga	13	0	2	1	9	1	24	2
VfB Stuttgart	Total		58	4	5	1	11	1	74	6
FC Ingolstadt 04	2013–14	2. Bundesliga	9	1	3	2	0	0	12	3
Ferencváros	2014–15	Nemzeti Bajnokság I	6	2	1	0	0	0	7	2
Ferencváros	2015–16	Nemzeti Bajnokság I	21	2	4	1	3	0	28	3
Ferencváros	2016–17	Nemzeti Bajnokság I	19	2	6	1	3	0	25	3
Ferencváros	2017–18	Nemzeti Bajnokság I	4	1	0	0	1	0	5	1
Ferencváros	Total		50	7	11	2	4	0	65	9
Career total			396	84	29	7	21	3	442	94

== Honours ==
Schalke 04

- DFB-Ligapokal runner-up: 2001, 2002

Ferencváros

- Nemzeti Bajnokság I: 2015–16
- Hungarian Cup: 2014–15, 2015–16, 2016–17
- Hungarian League Cup: 2014–15
- Szuperkupa: 2015

Individual

- Hungarian Footballer of the Year: 2007, 2008
- Named in the 2007–08 Bundesliga all-star team (bundesliga.de)
- Pro Urbe Prize: 2008
