= List of Mezőkövesdi SE seasons =

Mezőkövesdi Sport Egyesület is a professional Hungarian football club based in Mezőkövesd, Hungary.

== Key ==
Nemzeti Bajnokság I

- Pld = Matches played
- W = Matches won
- D = Matches drawn
- L = Matches lost
- GF = Goals for
- GA = Goals against
- Pts = Points
- Pos = Final position

Hungarian football league system

- NBI = Nemzeti Bajnokság I
- NBII = Nemzeti Bajnokság II
- NBIII = Nemzeti Bajnokság III
- MBI = Megyei Bajnokság I

Magyar Kupa

- F = Final
- SF = Semi-finals
- QF = Quarter-finals
- R16 = Round of 16
- R32 = Round of 32
- R64 = Round of 64
- R128 = Round of 128

UEFA

- F = Final
- SF = Semi-finals
- QF = Quarter-finals
- Group = Group stage
- PO = Play-offs
- QR3 = Third qualifying round
- QR2 = Second qualifying round
- QR1 = First qualifying round
- PR = Preliminary round

Winners	Runners-up	Third	Promoted	Relegated

== Seasons ==
As of 18 May 2024

Season	League									Cup	UEFA		Manager	Ref.
Season	Div.	Pld	W	D	L	GF	GA	Pts.	Pos.	Cup	Competition	Result	Manager	Ref.
2000–01	MBI ↑	38	24	8	6	94	42	80	3rd		Did not qualify			
2001–02	NBIII	26	12	7	7	40	30	43	4th		Did not qualify			
2002–03	NBIII	30	14	7	9	36	34	49	5th		Did not qualify			
2003–04	NBIII	30	16	6	8	44	34	54	3rd	?	Did not qualify			
2004–05	NBIII	26	13	9	4	42	25	48	2nd	?	Did not qualify			
2005–06	NBIII	30	15	7	8	58	37	52	5th	?	Did not qualify			
2006–07	NBIII ↑	26	14	9	3	53	28	51	3rd	?	Did not qualify			
2007–08	NBII ↓	30	4	7	19	26	51	19	16th	?	Did not qualify			
2008–09	NBIII ↑	30	22	4	4	78	21	70	1st	R64	Did not qualify			
2009–10	NBII	28	11	9	8	37	35	42	5th	R16	Did not qualify			
2010–11	NBII	30	19	5	6	47	20	62	2nd	R64	Did not qualify			
2011–12	NBII	30	12	8	10	43	40	44	5th	R32	Did not qualify			
2012–13	NBII ↑	30	18	4	8	60	36	58	1st	R64	Did not qualify			
2013–14	NBI ↓	30	6	6	18	27	52	24	15th	4R	Did not qualify		(Hungary) Véber, (Hungary) Tóth	
2014–15	NBII	30	13	9	8	53	37	48	4th	R32	Did not qualify		(Hungary) Tóth, (Hungary) Lucsánszky	
2015–16	NBII ↑	30	17	6	7	45	25	57	2nd	R64	Did not qualify		(Hungary) Lucsánszky, (Hungary) Pintér	
2016–17	NBI	33	10	10	13	39	54	40	9th	SF	Did not qualify		(Hungary) Pintér, (Serbia) Sivić, (Slovakia) Radványi	
2017–18	NBI	33	9	10	14	35	52	37	9th	R64	Did not qualify		(Slovakia) Radványi, (Hungary) Kuttor	
2018–19	NBI	33	12	8	13	45	40	44	6th	QF	Did not qualify		(Hungary) Kuttor	
2019–20	NBI	33	14	8	11	42	31	50	4th	R	Did not qualify		(Hungary) Kuttor	
2020–21	NBI	33	11	9	13	40	46	42	8th	QF	Did not qualify		(Hungary) Kuttor, (Hungary) Pintér	
2021–22	NBI	33	10	8	15	37	49	38	10th	R32	Did not qualify		(Hungary) Pintér, (Hungary) Supka	
2022–23	NBI	33	11	9	13	40	43	42	7th	QF	Did not qualify		(Hungary) Kuttor	
2023–24	NBI ↓	33	5	6	22	31	63	21	12th	R64	Did not qualify		(Hungary) Kuttor, (Serbia) Milanović	
