= 1909–10 Magyar Kupa =

Tournament details
- Country: Hungary

Final positions
- Champions: MTK Budapest
- Runners-up: Budapesti TC

The 1909–10 Magyar Kupa (English: Hungarian Cup) was the 1st season of Hungary's annual knock-out cup football competition.

== Final ==
8 September 1910
16:00 (UTC+2)

MTK Budapest FC	1–1	Budapesti TC
?	Report	?

Millenáris Sporttelep, Budapest
Attendance: 5,000
Referee: Gyula Kiss (Hungary)

=== Replay ===
2 October 1910
17:30 (UTC+2)

MTK Budapest FC	3–1	Budapesti TC
Kertész (2x); Révész	Report	Szendrő

Millenáris Sporttelep, Budapest
Attendance: 5,000
Referee: ? (Hungary)

== See also ==
- 1909–10 Nemzeti Bajnokság I
