= Vaszilisz Teodoru =

Hungarian football manager (born 1962)

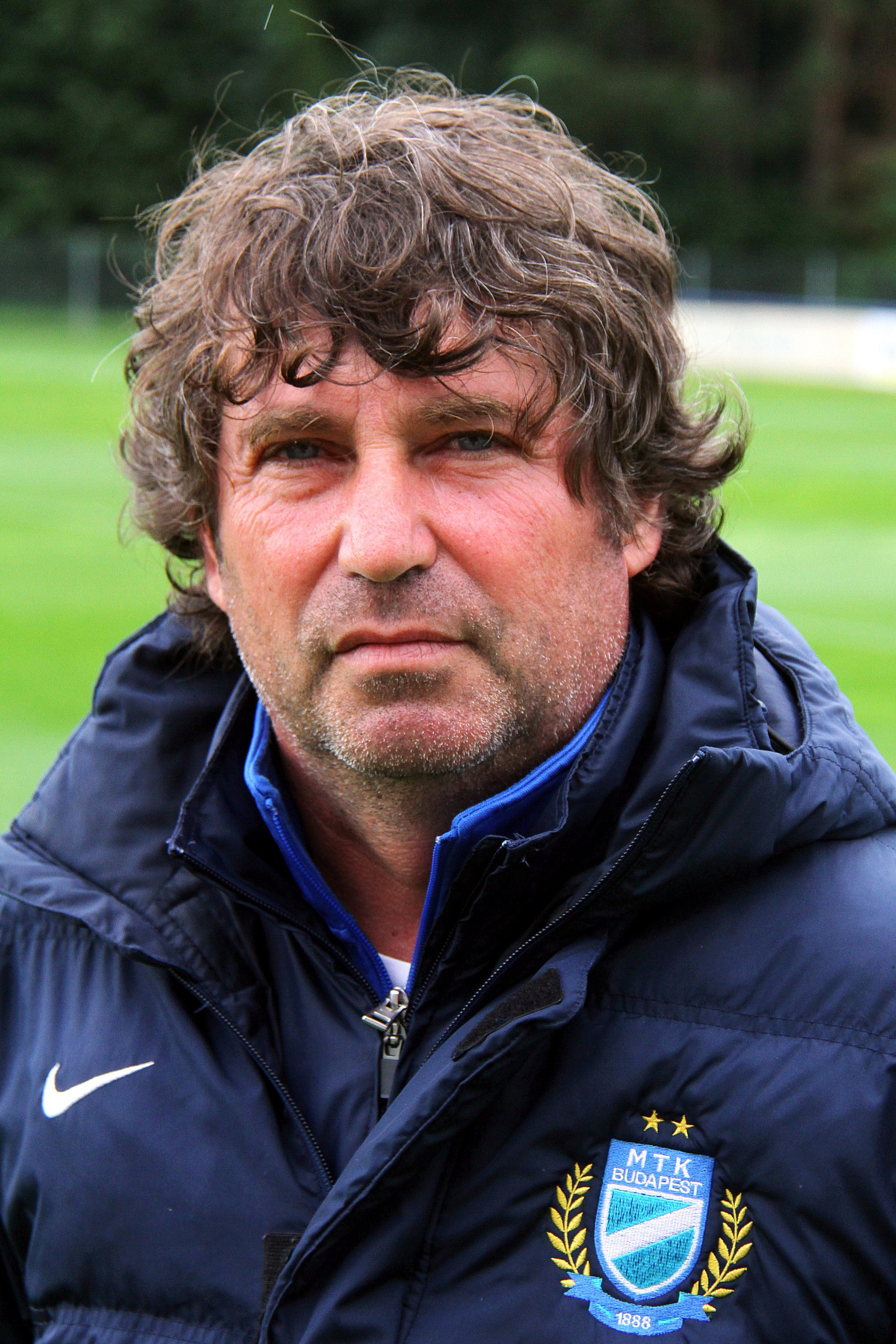
- Teodoru with MTK in 2016

Personal information
- Date of birth: 22 August 1962 (age 64)
- Place of birth: Miskolc, Hungary
- Height: 1.73 m (5 ft 8 in)
- Position: Striker

Team information
- Current team: MTK (assistant)

Senior career*
Years	Team	Apps	(Gls)
1978–1984	Diósgyőr	78	(9)
1984–1990	Vasas	83	(12)
1990–1991	BVSC		
1991–1992	EPA Larnaca		
1992–1993	Vasas	12	(1)
1993	Budafok	7	(0)
1993–1994	Rákospalota	5	(0)
- St. Pölten
Total		185	(23)

Managerial career
- 2004–2016: MTK (assistant)
- 2016: MTK
- 2017–: MTK (assistant)
- 2021: MTK (caretaker)
- * Club domestic league appearances and goals

Vaszilisz Teodoru (born 22 August 1962) is a Hungarian professional football manager and former player of Greek descent, who is an assistant coach of MTK.

== Managerial career ==
On 3 February 2016, Teodoru was appointed as the manager of the Nemzeti Bajnokság I club MTK.

== Career statistics ==
Appearances and goals by club, season and league
Club	Season	League		
Club	Season	Division	Apps	Goals
Diósgyőr	1978–79	Nemzeti Bajnokság I	4	1
Diósgyőr	1979–80	Nemzeti Bajnokság I	11	2
Diósgyőr	1980–81	Nemzeti Bajnokság I	16	1
Diósgyőr	1981–82	Nemzeti Bajnokság I	18	2
Diósgyőr	1982–83	Nemzeti Bajnokság I	26	3
Diósgyőr	1983–84	Nemzeti Bajnokság I	3	0
Diósgyőr	Total		78	9
Vasas	1984–85	Nemzeti Bajnokság I	7	1
Vasas	1985–86	Nemzeti Bajnokság I	21	3
Vasas	1986–87	Nemzeti Bajnokság I	28	4
Vasas	1987–88	Nemzeti Bajnokság I	14	3
Vasas	1988–89	Nemzeti Bajnokság I	7	1
Vasas	1989–90	Nemzeti Bajnokság I	6	0
Vasas	1992–93	Nemzeti Bajnokság I	12	1
Vasas	Total		95	13
Budafok	1992–93	Nemzeti Bajnokság II	7	0
Rákospalota	1993–94	Nemzeti Bajnokság II	5	0
Career total			185	23

== Managerial statistics ==
As of 25 July 2016

Team	Nat	From	To	Record							
Team	Nat	From	To	P	W	D	L	GF	GA	GD	W%
MTK	Hungary	3 February 2016		26	9	8	9	22	31	−9	34.6
Total				26	9	8	9	22	31	−9	34.6
