= 2017–18 Nemzeti Bajnokság II =

Nemzeti Bajnokság II
- Season: 2017–18
- Champions: MTK Budapest (2nd title)
- Promoted: MTK Budapest; Kisvárda
- Relegated: Szolnok; Szeged; Sopron
- Matches: 380
- Goals: 990 (2.61 per match)
- Top goalscorer: Botond Birtalan (22) (Békéscsaba)
- All statistics correct as of 3 June 2018.

The 2017–18 Nemzeti Bajnokság II (also known as 2017–18 Merkantil Bank Liga) was Hungary's 67th season of the Nemzeti Bajnokság II, the second tier of the Hungarian football league system.

On 19 June 2017, it was announced that the Hungarian Football Federation accepted all of the licenses of the 2017–18 Nemzeti Bajnokság II clubs.

== Team changes ==
Promoted from 2016–17 Nemzeti Bajnokság III	Relegated from 2016–17 Nemzeti Bajnokság I
Győr (West)	MTK Budapest
Budafok (Center)	Gyírmót
Kazincbarcika (East)	
Promoted to 2017–18 Nemzeti Bajnokság I	Relegated to 2017–18 Nemzeti Bajnokság III
Puskás Akadémia	Kozármisleny
Balmazújváros	Cigánd
	Szegedi EOL

== Stadiums by capacity ==
Team	Location	Stadium	Capacity
Békéscsaba	Békéscsaba	Kórház utcai	13,000
Budafok	Budapest, Budafok	Promontor utcai	3,000
Budaörs	Budaörs	Árok utcai	1,200
Cegléd	Cegléd	Malomtószéli	4,000
Aqvital	Csákvár	Tersztyánszky Ödön	2,020
Dorog	Dorog	Buzánszky Jenő	5,000
Gyirmót	Győr	Ménfői úti	4,000
Győr	Győr	ETO Park	14,000
Kazincbarcika	Kazincbarcika	Pete András	3,000
Kisvárda	Kisvárda	Várkert	2,124
Mosonmagyaróvár	Mosonmagyaróvár	Wittmann Antal	4,000
MTK	Budapest, Józsefváros	Hidegkuti Nándor	5,322
Nyíregyháza Spartacus	Nyíregyháza	Városi	10,500
Siófok	Siófok	Révész Géza	6,500
Sopron	Sopron	Városi	4,500
Soroksár	Budapest, Soroksár	Szamosi Mihály	5,000
Szeged	Gyula	Grosics Akadémia	1,500
Szolnok	Szolnok	Tiszaligeti	4,000
Vác	Vác	Ligeti	12,000
Zalaegerszeg	Zalaegerszeg	ZTE Arena	9,300

== Stadiums by locations ==
Location of teams in 2017–18 Nemzeti Bajnokság II
Location of Budapest teams.

== Personnel and kits ==
Team	Manager	Captain	Kit manufacturer	Shirt sponsor
Békéscsaba	(Hungary) Gábor Boér	(Hungary)	Adidas	Békés Drén
Budafok	(Hungary) György Gálhidi	(Hungary) Csaba Csizmadia		
Budaörs	(Hungary) György Bognár	(Hungary) Ádám Csobánki	Ziccer	Volkswagen
Cegléd	(Hungary) László Klausz	(Hungary)	Joma	
Csákvár	(Hungary) István Szíjjártó	(Hungary)	adidas	Aqvital
Dorog	(Hungary) Szabolcs Schindler	(Hungary) Illés Sitku	Adidas	Pannon Falap-Lemez
Gyirmót	(Hungary) Péter Hannich	(Hungary)		
Győr	(Hungary) Lázár Szentes	(Hungary)		
Kazincbarcika	(Hungary) Zoltán Vitelki	(Hungary)		
Kisvárda	(Hungary) Elemér Kondás	(Hungary) Lucas	Adidas	Master Good
Mosonmagyaróvár	(Hungary) Péter Várhidi	(Hungary) Balázs Laki	Legea	Credobus
MTK Budapest	(Hungary) Tamás Feczkó	(Hungary) József Kanta		
Nyíregyháza	(Hungary) Tamás Lucsánszky	(Hungary) -	Jako	Révész
Siófok	(Hungary) Attila Varga	(Hungary) -	Nike	HunGast
Sopron	(Hungary) Szabolcs Németh	(Hungary) Tamás Sifter	Nike	Swietelsky
Soroksár	(Hungary) Péter Lipcsei	(Hungary) Gábor Gyepes	Jako	Banetti
Szeged	(Serbia) Goran Kopunović	(Hungary) Levente Szántai	Lotto	Rádio 88
Szolnok	(Hungary) Pál Balogh	(Hungary) Zoltán Kenderes	hummel	Szolnok
Vác		(Hungary) Csaba Hegedűs	Joma	
Zalaegerszeg	(Hungary) Tamás Artner	(Hungary) -	mass	Pharos

== Managerial changes ==
Team	Outgoing manager	Manner of departure	Date of vacancy	Position is table	Replaced by	Date of appointment
Csákvár	(Hungary) Károly Szanyó	Mutual agreement	12 September 2017	20th	(Hungary) István Szíjjártó	12 September 2017
Siófok	(Hungary) László Disztl	Mutual agreement	26 September 2017	18th	(Hungary) Attila Varga	28 September 2017
Győr	(Hungary) Balázs Bekő	Sacked	27 September 2017		(Hungary) Lázár Szentes	28 September 2017
Budafok	(Hungary) László Prukner	Mutual agreement	17 October 2017		(Hungary) Bálint Tóth	17 October 2017
Gyirmót	(Slovakia) Ladislav Molnár	Sacked	7 November 2017		(Hungary) Péter Hannich	8 November 2017
Sopron	(Hungary) Szabolcs Németh	Mutual agreement	13 November 2017	20th	(Hungary) Balázs Bekő	3 January 2018
Zalaegerszeg	(Serbia) Zoran Spisjak	Sacked	27 November 2017	13th	(Hungary) Géza Vlaszák and (Brazil) Felipe Matos (caretakers)	27 November 2017
Szeged	(Hungary) Attila Supka	Mutual agreement, contract with Honvéd	10 December 2017	17th	(Serbia) Goran Kopunović	22 December 2017
Budafok	(Hungary) Bálint Tóth	End of term	12 December 2017	18th	(Hungary) György Gálhidi	12 December 2017
Vác	(Hungary) Károly Horváth	Mutual agreement, technical director of ZTE	19 December 2017	5th		
Zalaegerszeg	(Hungary) Géza Vlaszák and (Brazil) Felipe Matos (caretakers)	Caretakers replaced	19 December 2017	14th	(Hungary) Tamás Artner	19 December 2017
Budafok	(Hungary) György Gálhidi	Mutual agreement	24 April 2018	19th	(Hungary) Bálint Tóth	24 April 2018

== League table ==
Pos	Team	Pld	W	D	L	GF	GA	GD	Pts	Promotion or relegation
1	MTK Budapest (C, P)	38	26	4	8	88	44	+44	82	Promotion to Nemzeti Bajnokság I
2	Kisvárda (P)	38	22	9	7	70	40	+30	75	Promotion to Nemzeti Bajnokság I
3	Békéscsaba	38	19	8	11	64	43	+21	65	
4	Budaörs	38	17	12	9	70	52	+18	63	
5	Nyíregyháza	38	16	12	10	54	40	+14	60	
6	Gyirmót	38	16	11	11	58	46	+12	59	
7	Győr	38	17	7	14	55	53	+2	58	
8	Soroksár	38	15	11	12	48	41	+7	56	
9	Cegléd	38	14	10	14	42	49	−7	52	
10	Vác	38	13	12	13	42	38	+4	51	
11	Aqvital Csákvár	38	13	8	17	50	66	−16	47	
12	Dorog	38	11	13	14	45	47	−2	46	
13	Siófok	38	12	9	17	40	45	−5	45	
14	Budafok	38	12	9	17	42	56	−14	45	
15	Mosonmagyaróvár	38	10	15	13	38	45	−7	45	
16	Zalaegerszeg	38	12	8	18	45	58	−13	44	
17	Kazincbarcika	38	12	8	18	39	56	−17	44	
18	Szolnok (R)	38	12	6	20	38	58	−20	42	Relegation to Nemzeti Bajnokság III
19	Szeged (R)	38	8	17	13	31	40	−9	41	Relegation to Nemzeti Bajnokság III
20	Sopron (R)	38	3	11	24	31	73	−42	20	Relegation to Nemzeti Bajnokság III

Source: Soccerway
Rules for classification: 1st points; 2nd overall wins; 3rd goal difference; 4th head-to-head points; 5th head-to-head goal difference; 6th head-to-head away goals scored; 7th fair-play points; 8th drawing of lots
(C) Champions; (P) Promoted; (R) Relegated

== Number of teams by counties ==
	County	No. teams	Teams
1	Győr-Moson-Sopron	4	Gyirmót, Győr, Mosonmagyaróvár and Sopron
2	Budapest	3	Budafok, MTK Budapest, and Soroksár
2	Pest	3	Budaörs, Cegléd, and Vác
4	Szabolcs-Szatmár-Bereg	2	Kisvárda and Nyíregyháza
5	Békés	1	Békéscsaba
5	Borsod-Abaúj-Zemplén	1	Kazincbarcika
5	Csongrád	2	Szeged
5	Fejér	1	Csákvár
5	Jász-Nagykun-Szolnok	1	Szolnok
5	Komárom-Esztergom	1	Dorog
5	Somogy	1	Siófok
5	Zala	1	Zalaegerszeg

== See also ==
- 2017–18 Magyar Kupa
- 2017–18 Nemzeti Bajnokság I
- 2017–18 Nemzeti Bajnokság III
- 2017–18 Megyei Bajnokság I
