= Béla Volentik =

Hungarian footballer and manager (1907–1990)

Personal information
- Date of birth: 5 December 1907
- Place of birth: Szolnok, Austria-Hungary
- Date of death: 27 October 1990 (aged 82)
- Place of death: Budapest, Hungary
- Position: Midfielder

Senior career*
Years	Team	Apps	(Gls)
1927–1929	Nemzeti SC		
1929–1932	Újpest		
1932–	FC Lugano		

International career
1927	Hungary	1	(0)

Managerial career
- 1936–1938: FC Aarau
- 1938–1942: FC St. Gallen
- 1942–1946: BSC Young Boys
- 1947–1950: FC Lugano
- 1950–1951: Lausanne Sport
- 1952–1953: FC Lugano
- 1953–1955: Luxembourg
- 1955: Bp. Haladás
- 1956–1957: MTK
- 1957–1958: Pécsi Dózsa
- 1959–1960: Hungary Olympic
- 1962–1963: Bulgaria
- 1964: MTK
- 1966–1967: BFC Dynamo
- * Club domestic league appearances and goals

Béla Volentik (5 December 1907 – 27 October 1990) was a Hungarian footballer and football manager. He played for Nemzeti SC, Újpest, FC Lugano and with the bronze medal winning Hungary national team at the 1960 Summer Olympics at Rome, Italy. He capped once.

He started his coaching career in Switzerland with FC Aarau and went on to coach FC St. Gallen, BSC Young Boys, FC Lugano and Lausanne Sport. He then had a stint with the Luxembourg national football team before coming back to Hungary where he coached Bp. Haladás, MTK twice, leading them to the 1964 European Cup Winners' Cup Final and Pécsi Dózsa. He also coached Bulgaria and BFC Dynamo.
