= Oszkár Szendrő =

Hungarian footballer (1889–1947)

Szendrő Oszkár
Personal information
- Date of birth: 11 April 1889
- Place of birth: Budapest, Hungary
- Date of death: 1 August 1947 (aged 58)
- Place of death: Budapest, Hungary
- Position: Half back

Youth career
- 1905–1907: Budapesti TC

Senior career*
Years	Team	Apps	(Gls)
1907–1914	Budapesti TC		

International career
1908–1913	Hungary	13	(0)
- * Club domestic league appearances and goals

Szendrő Oszkár (11 April 1889 – 1 August 1947) was a Hungarian international footballer who played as a half back. Szendrő, who was Jewish, played club football for Budapesti TC, also represented Hungary national team at international level, earning 13 caps between 1908 and 1913, and appearing at the 1912 Summer Olympics.

== Club career ==
Szendrő began his football career when he signed with Budapest TC in 1905. He was 15 at the time.

== International career ==
Szendrő earned 13 caps with the Hungary national team between 1908 and 1913. In 1912, he was a member of the Hungarian Olympic Team.
