= Štefánik Tournament in Bratislava =

Turnaj M. R. Štefánika v Bratislave
- Founded: 1932
- Abolished: 1933
- Region: Czechoslovakia (UEFA)
- Teams: 4
- Last champions: (Hungary) MTK Budapest FC
- Most championships: (Austria) Wiener AC (Hungary) MTK Budapest FC (1 title each)

Štefánik Tournament in Bratislava (Slovak: Turnaj M. R. Štefánika v Bratislave) was an annual summer international football tournament in honor of the Slovak politician, diplomat, and astronomer Milan Rastislav Štefánik held in Bratislava, Czechoslovakia, from 1932 to 1933. The tournament was held in the month of June.

The teams played 3 round-robin 90-minute matches in the tournament.

== Finals ==
Year	Champion	Runners-up	Third place	Fourth place
1932	(Austria) Wiener Athletic Club	(Czechoslovakia) SK Viktoria Žižkov	(Hungary) MTK Budapest FC	(Hungary) Bocskay Debrecen
1933	(Hungary) MTK Budapest FC	(Czechoslovakia) 1. ČsŠK Bratislava	(Czechoslovakia) AC Sparta Praha	(France) Racing Club Paris
