= 1982–83 Nemzeti Bajnokság I =

Nemzeti Bajnokság I
- Season: 1982–83

Statistics of Nemzeti Bajnokság I in the 1982–83 season.

== Overview ==
It was contested by 16 teams, and Győri ETO FC won the championship for the third time in their history, successfully defending their championship from the previous season under coach József Verebes. Győr went undefeated at home throughout the entire campaign, and were top of the table for 23 out of the 30 matchweeks. The Rába-Coast team contested a close title-race with Csepel FC for the first half of the season. The club from the 23rd district of Budapest occupied the top spot from matchday 14 until matchday 17. After drawing 0–0 against Tatabánya, the club's dreams of a 5th national title fell apart, as they lost 5 of their 9 subsequent league games. Meanwhile, Győr won 6 of their last 10 match-ups, and were top of the table from Matchday 18 until the end of the campaign. Despite pressure from Ferencváros, Csepel and Honvéd, nobody could knock Győr off their perch, confirming their championship on the last day of the season with a 6–1 win over Újpest in front of 28,000 spectators at Rába ETO Stadion. Gyula Hajszán scored a hat-trick.

== League standings ==
Pos	Team	Pld	W	D	L	GF	GA	GD	Pts	Qualification or relegation
1	Rába ETO Győr (C)	30	19	6	5	82	37	+45	44	Qualification for European Cup first round
2	Ferencváros	30	19	5	6	73	46	+27	43	Qualification for UEFA Cup first round
3	Budapest Honvéd	30	17	8	5	57	33	+24	42	Qualification for UEFA Cup first round
4	Csepel	30	13	11	6	52	46	+6	37	
5	Újpesti Dózsa	30	12	8	10	45	47	−2	32	Qualification for Cup Winners' Cup first round
6	Tatabányai Bányász	30	9	11	10	42	40	+2	29	
7	Vasas	30	11	6	13	56	52	+4	28	
8	Haladás	30	10	8	12	33	40	−7	28	
9	Diósgyőr	30	8	11	11	36	44	−8	27	
10	Nyíregyházi VSSC	30	9	8	13	29	37	−8	26	
11	Zalaegerszeg	30	8	10	12	37	46	−9	26	
12	MTK-VM	30	9	8	13	40	58	−18	26	
13	Videoton	30	11	3	16	48	47	+1	25	
14	Pécs	30	9	7	14	45	52	−7	25	
15	Debreceni MVSC (R)	30	8	9	13	35	51	−16	25	Relegation to Nemzeti Bajnokság II
16	Békéscsaba (R)	30	5	7	18	41	75	−34	17	Relegation to Nemzeti Bajnokság II

Source: rsssf.com
(C) Champions; (R) Relegated

== Results ==
Home \ Away	BÉK	CSE	DEB	DIÓ	FTC	HAL	HON	MTK	NYÍ	PÉC	GYŐ	TAT	ÚJP	VAS	VID	ZTE
Békéscsaba		0–0	3–1	1–1	0–1	1–1	2–3	2–2	1–2	3–2	3–2	0–3	1–1	1–2	2–1	3–1
Csepel	4–3		1–1	2–1	1–1	4–1	3–5	3–0	3–1	1–0	2–2	2–1	1–2	2–5	2–1	2–0
Debreceni MVSC	2–1	2–4		3–0	1–2	0–1	1–1	1–2	0–0	2–1	3–0	1–1	2–1	2–1	0–1	1–0
Diósgyőr	4–2	0–0	1–0		2–2	0–0	0–1	2–1	2–0	3–0	3–7	0–0	1–1	3–2	1–0	3–1
Ferencváros	8–3	1–3	4–0	4–0		4–0	2–1	2–1	2–1	5–2	0–3	2–1	0–3	5–3	3–1	2–2
Haladás	3–0	2–2	0–0	3–2	0–2		1–2	7–1	1–0	1–0	2–1	0–2	3–0	1–0	1–3	1–1
Budapest Honvéd	2–1	3–3	2–0	1–0	2–3	2–0		1–0	3–0	2–1	2–2	1–1	1–3	2–0	3–0	3–1
MTK-VM	3–0	1–3	2–2	1–1	0–2	1–0	1–1		1–1	5–3	0–1	2–1	1–1	0–2	2–1	3–1
Nyíregyházi VSSC	3–1	3–0	1–1	0–0	1–1	0–0	1–0	0–1		2–1	0–2	2–2	1–0	2–0	1–0	2–1
Pécs	4–2	3–0	2–3	2–1	4–2	1–1	1–3	1–1	1–0		1–1	2–0	2–2	1–1	3–0	1–1
Rába ETO Győr	5–1	4–0	5–1	2–0	3–3	2–0	1–0	6–0	2–1	3–1		3–2	6–1	2–2	5–2	1–1
Tatabányai Bányász	2–2	0–0	1–1	1–1	3–2	0–1	1–1	2–1	2–1	1–1	2–1		4–1	3–2	4–2	1–1
Újpesti Dózsa	4–1	1–2	1–1	1–1	1–2	3–2	2–2	1–1	2–1	2–0	1–0	2–1		2–3	1–0	1–0
Vasas	3–0	1–1	4–2	2–1	3–4	3–0	1–3	3–2	1–1	0–1	2–3	3–0	1–2		2–1	2–3
Videoton	4–0	1–1	4–0	1–1	0–2	3–0	0–3	6–2	4–0	3–1	1–5	1–0	2–0	0–0		5–1
Zalaegerszeg	1–1	0–0	4–1	3–1	1–0	0–0	1–1	1–2	2–1	1–2	0–2	1–0	4–2	2–2	1–0	

Source: rsssf.com
Legend: Blue = home team win; Yellow = draw; Red = away team win.

== Statistical leaders ==
=== Top goalscorers ===
Rank	Scorer	Club	Goals
1	(Hungary) Lajos Dobány	Pécsi MSC; Szombathelyi Haladás	23
2	(Hungary) Péter Hannich	Rába ETO	20
3	(Hungary) László Kiss	Vasas SC	17
3	(Hungary) Tibor Nyilasi	Ferencvárosi TC	17
5	(Hungary) György Kerekes	Debreceni MVSC	16
5	(Hungary) Sándor Kiss	Újpesti Dózsa	16
7	(Hungary) Márton Esterházy	Budapest Honvéd	14
7	(Hungary) József Szabó	Videoton SC	14
7	(Hungary) László Szokolai	Ferencvárosi TC	14
7	(Hungary) Béla Várady	Vasas SC	14

== Attendances ==
#	Club	Average
1	Ferencváros	18,877
2	Győr	16,933
3	Nyíregyháza	13,400
4	Vasas	12,977
5	Debrecen	12,067
6	Budapest Honvéd	11,220
7	Újpest	9,567
8	Haladás	8,429
9	Diósgyör	8,100
10	Békéscsaba	7,400
11	Pécs	7,300
12	Zalaegerszeg	6,633
13	Csepel	5,667
14	Videoton	5,467
15	MTK	5,033
16	Tatabánya Bányász	4,067
