= Imre Senkey =

Hungarian football manager (1898–1984)

Personal information
- Date of birth: 21 June 1898
- Place of birth: Budapest, Hungary
- Date of death: 10 October 1984 (aged 86)
- Position: Defender

International career
Years	Team	Apps	(Gls)
1924–1928	Hungary	6	(0)

Managerial career
- 1931–1935: MTK
- 1947: Fiorentina
- 1947–1948: Roma
- 1948–1950: Brescia
- 1951–1952: Genoa
- 1959–1960: Torino

Imre Senkey (21 June 1898 – 10 October 1984) was a Hungarian football player and manager, who spent the majority of his managerial time in Italy. Senkey managed some of the top clubs in Italian football such as Roma, Torino, Fiorentina and Genoa. A defender, he made six appearances for the Hungary national team.

== Honours ==
Torino

- Serie B: 1959–60
