= Michael Boris =

German footballer and manager (born 1975)

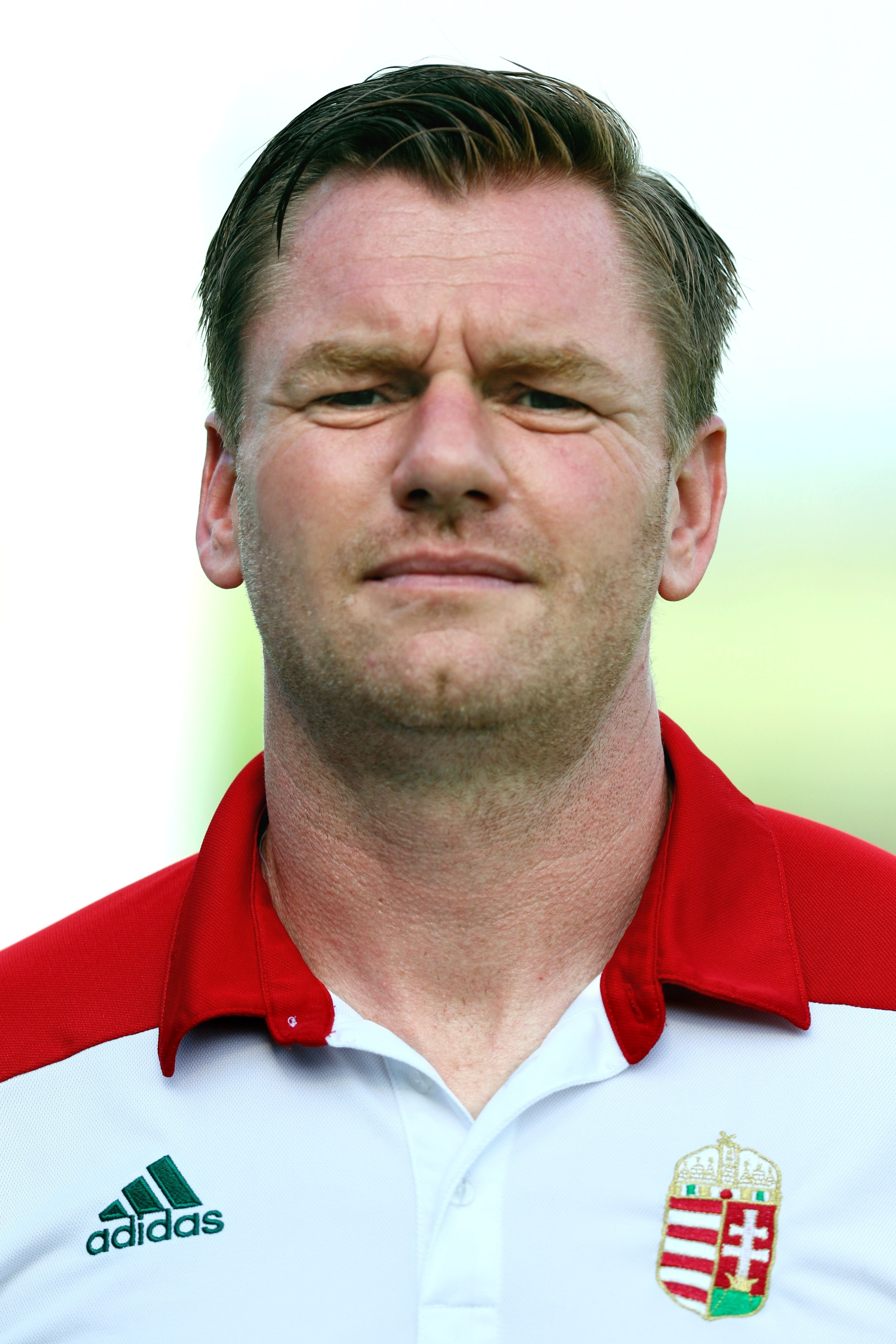
- Boris in 2017 as coach of the Hungary U21

Personal information
- Date of birth: 3 June 1975 (age 51)
- Place of birth: Kirchhellen, West Germany
- Height: 1.82 m (6 ft 0 in)
- Position: Goalkeeper

Youth career
- SG Wattenscheid 09

Senior career*
Years	Team	Apps	(Gls)
–1997	SG Wattenscheid 09 II		
1997–1998	KSV Hessen Kassel		
1998	VfB Speldorf		
1998–2004	Kickers Emden		

Managerial career
- 2004–2007: Kickers Emden (Assistant coach)
- 2007–2008: VfB Homberg
- 2008–2010: TSV Germania Windeck
- 2010–2011: Schalke 04 II
- 2011–2014: Sportfreunde Siegen
- 2014: Sportfreunde Lotte
- 2014–2015: Sportfreunde Siegen
- 2015–2016: KFC Uerdingen 05
- 2016–2017: Hungary U19
- 2016–2019: Hungary U21
- 2019: Hong Kong U21
- 2019: Tokyo Verdy (Assistant coach)
- 2019–2021: MTK Budapest FC
- 2021: SønderjyskE
- 2022: Fehérvár FC
- 2024: SV Waldhof Mannheim (Assistant coach)
- 2024: Szeged
- * Club domestic league appearances and goals

Michael Boris (born 3 June 1975) is a German professional football manager and former player.

== Playing career ==
As a player he played in lower class German clubs: Wattenscheid II, Hessen Kassel, VfB Speldorf and Kickers Emden.

== Managerial career ==
He began his coaching career at Kickers Emden in 2004, where he was an assistant coach for three years. After several teams in the lower classes he became the coach of Uerdingen, where he managed the team in 19 matches and won 11 of it.

In August 2016, he was appointed as the federal coach of the Hungarian U19 national team. His first match in Telki was against the Slovenian national team, and in the second half, György Kamarás scored the only goal of the match. For the first time, the U21 team was led by him at a qualifier against Liechtenstein. For two and a half years, he worked for the MLSZ, and in January 2019 he became assistant coach in Japan for the second-class Tokyo Verdy team. On 30 May 2019, he was appointed as the head coach of the Hungarian second-class team MTK.

In June 2021, Boris was named new manager of Danish Superliga club SønderjyskE. Following a poor start to the season he was sacked on 1 November 2021.

On 15 February 2022, he was announced as the new manager of Hungarian team Fehérvár FC.

In March 2024, Boris became assistant manager of Marco Antwerpen at SV Waldhof Mannheim on a sort term contract running for the rest of the season.

In June 2024, he became manager of Szeged in Hungary.

== Honours ==
Sportfreunde Siegen

- NRW-Liga runner up: 2011–12
