= Gyula Feldmann =

Hungarian footballer and coach

Personal information
- Date of birth: 16 November 1880
- Place of birth: Szeged, Austria-Hungary
- Date of death: 31 October 1955 (aged 74)
- Position: Defender

Senior career*
Years	Team	Apps	(Gls)
1909–1914	Nemzeti SC	44	(0)
1916–1917	Ferencváros	9	(0)
1917–1922	MTK Budapest	75	(0)
- Makkabi Brno

International career
1910–1920	Hungary	10	(0)

Managerial career
- 1924–1926: Bremer SV
- 1927: MTK Budapest
- 1927–1929: Juventus București
- 1928–1931: Fiorentina
- 1931–1934: Palermo
- 1934–1936: Ambrosiana-Inter
- 1936–1938: Torino
- 1938–1939: SK Jugoslavija
- 1939–1940: MTK Budapest
- * Club domestic league appearances and goals

Gyula Feldmann (16 November 1880 – 31 October 1955) was a Hungarian football player and coach.

== Playing career ==
During his playing career Feldmann played with Nemzeti SC and MTK Budapest in the Nemzeti Bajnokság I.

== Coaching career ==
After a playing career with several Hungarian teams, Feldmann became a coach and coached MTK Budapest from 1927 to 1928. In 1928 he became Fiorentina boss, and in 1931 he replaced Tony Cargnelli at the helm of Palermo, leading the rosanero to a Serie A promotion. In 1934–1935 he obtained a Serie A runners-up position with Ambrosiana-Inter. He was sacked during the 1935–1936 season, and later became head coach of Torino.

In 1938 he took charge of SK Jugoslavija in the Yugoslav First League. He took charge of SK Jugoslavia in July that year replacing Károly Nemes who took charge of SK Bata Borovo after the departure of Bilek.
