= Imre Kovács =

Hungarian footballer

Personal information
- Date of birth: 26 November 1921
- Place of birth: Budapest, Hungary
- Date of death: 9 March 1996 (aged 74)
- Place of death: Budapest, Hungary
- Position: Midfielder

Senior career*
Years	Team	Apps	(Gls)
1945–1959	MTK Budapest FC	363	(37)

International career
1948–1952	Hungary	8	(0)
Medal record
Representing Hungary
Olympic Games
Gold medal – first place	1952 Helsinki
FIFA World Cup
Runner-up	1954 Switzerland
- * Club domestic league appearances and goals

Imre Kovács (26 November 1921 – 9 March 1996) was a Hungarian footballer who played as a midfielder for Hungary in the 1954 FIFA World Cup. He also played for MTK Budapest FC. He won a gold medal in football at the 1952 Summer Olympics.

His brother, József, was also a footballer.
