= József Verebes =

Hungarian footballer and manager

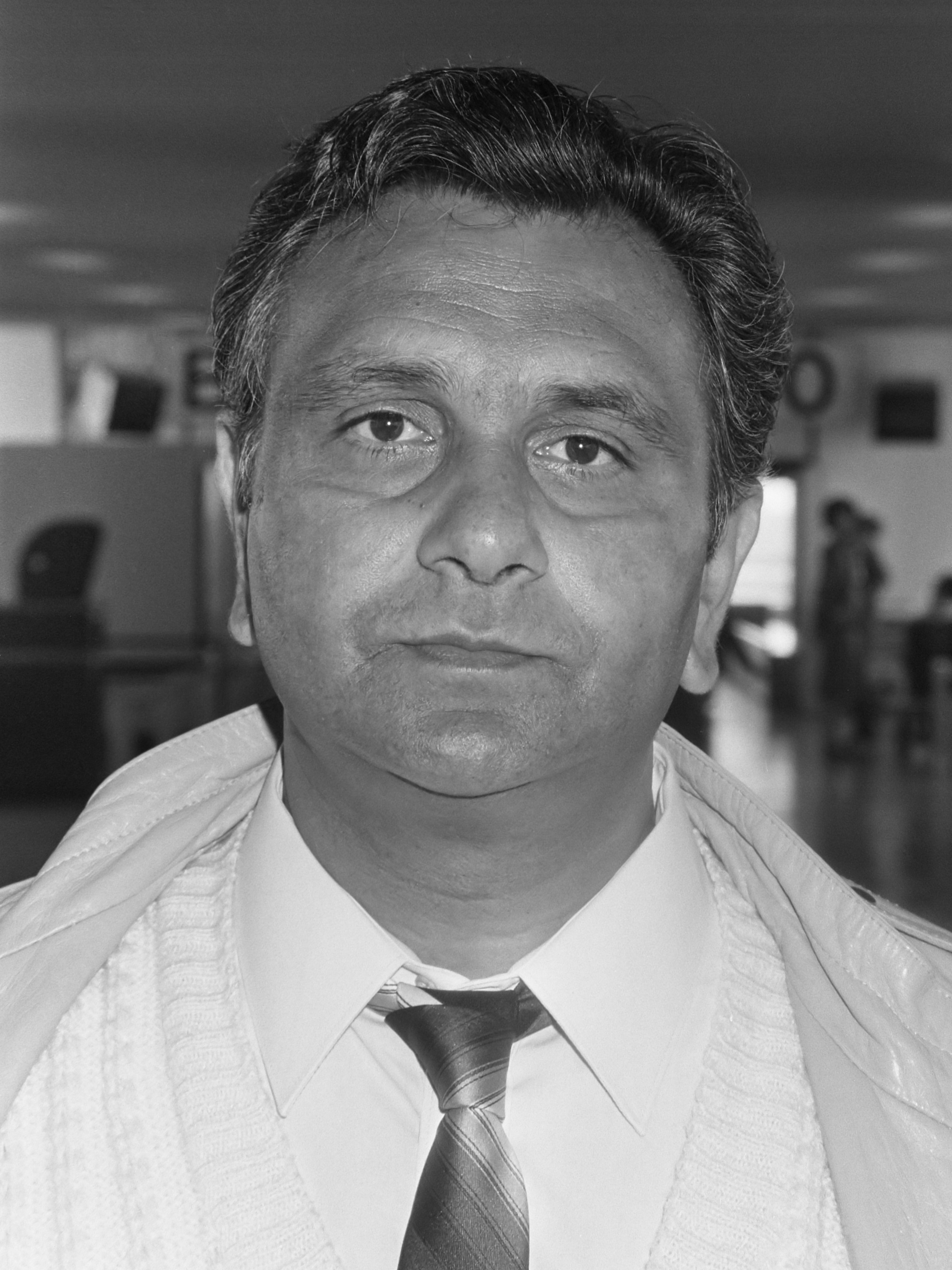
- Verebes in 1987

Personal information
- Date of birth: 23 March 1941
- Place of birth: Budapest, Hungary
- Date of death: 13 March 2016 (aged 74)
- Place of death: Budapest, Hungary
- Position: Forward

Senior career*
Years	Team	Apps	(Gls)
1961–1962	Ferencváros	3	(0)

Managerial career
- 1978: Kecskeméti SC
- 1979: Sülysáp
- 1979–1980: Videoton (assistant)
- 1980–1981: Videoton
- 1981–1986: Rába ETO
- 1986–1992: MTK-VM
- 1987: Hungary
- 1992: Kispest-Honvéd
- 1993–1994: Rába ETO
- 1993–1994: Hungary
- 1994–1995: Vasas SC
- 1996: Diósgyőr
- 1998–1999: Videoton
- 2000: Gödöllő
- 2007–2008: Vác
- 2009: Nagytétény
- 2010: Nagytétény
- * Club domestic league appearances and goals

József Verebes (23 March 1941 – 13 March 2016) was a Hungarian football manager and player. He played as a forward.

== Managerial career ==
=== Győr ===
Verebes became the advisor to his former club Győri ETO in 2011.

=== Nagytétény SE ===
On 15 October 2010, Verebes became the coach of Nagytétény SE, competing in the Budapest championship.

== Sources ==
- Verebes at Magyarfutball (in Hungarian)
