= Sándor Egervári =

Hungarian footballer and manager

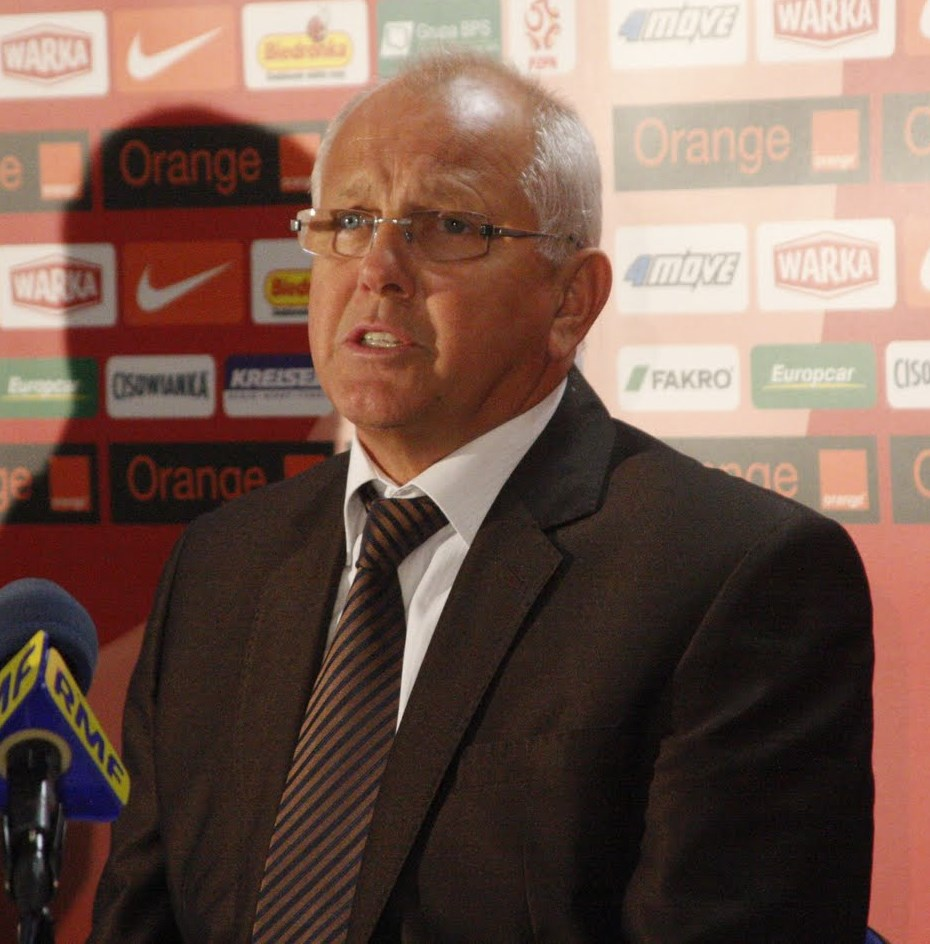

Personal information
- Date of birth: 15 July 1950 (age 76)
- Place of birth: Pomáz, Hungary

Senior career*
Years	Team	Apps	(Gls)
1968–1970	Kossuth KFSE		
1971–1972	Budapesti Spartacus SC		
1972–1976	Budapest Honvéd		
1976–1977	Szegedi EOL AK		
1977–1981	MTK		

International career
1974	Hungary (olympic)		

Managerial career
- 1993–1996: BVSC Budapest
- 1997: Érdi VSE
- 1997: Al-Ittihad
- 1998–1999: MTK
- 1999–2002: Dunaújváros
- 2002–2004: MTK
- 2004–2005: Vasas SC
- 2006–2007: Al Salmiya Club
- 2007–2009: Győri ETO
- 2009–2010: Hungary (youth)
- 2010–2013: Hungary
- 2016: Diósgyőr
Medal record
Men's football
Representing Hungary (as manager)
FIFA U-20 World Cup
Third place	2009 Egypt	Team
- * Club domestic league appearances and goals

Sándor Egervári (born 15 July 1950) is a Hungarian football manager and former player.

He attended the University of Physical Education in Budapest and qualified as a football coach in 1983. He has completed the UEFA A and B course and as well as the pro license course. He has managed clubs to the domestic title and cup success.

== Playing career ==
1971–1972 Hungarian First Division – Spartacus S.E

1972–1981 Hungarian First Division – Budapest Honvéd and MTK VM

1974 Member of the national Olympic team

== Management career ==
Egervári's coaching career began as an assistant coach in Hungary's last appearance at a world cup. This was in the Mexico 1986 tournament, when Hungary were one of the best European sides in the world. He was assistant coach for the national team for three years in total.

He then had a two-year spell, as assistant coach, to the Kuwaiti national team from 1986–88. Egervári then returned home to Hungary, with a growing reputation as a top coach. He assisted József Both, for a season and then helped György Mezey, over the next two years at Honvéd, during the years 1988–91, where he helped the Budapest club to two titles among other successes. This was achieved with both managers, in the capacity of assistant manager. Honvéd also fared well in European competition during his time there.

With domestic success behind him, Egervári moved to the now extinct club, BVSC Budapest. He took over when they were bottom, but worked his magic with them. BVSC were league and cup runners-up in his successful time there. Egervári then spent a short time in Saudi Arabia, coaching Al-Ittihad, before the lure of further success in Hungary followed. In 1998, he took over at MTK and guided them to the title and Hungarian Cup success.

=== Dunaújváros ===
One of his most notable successes followed when he moved to Dunaújváros in 1999. Once again his good coaching skills worked wonders and they were champions in his second season there. Dunaferr also enjoyed success in the European Cup, when they beat Hajduk Split on their journeys. The following season saw Egervári guide Dunaújváros to a runner-up spot.

=== MTK Hungária ===
He then returned to Budapest to once again manage MTK. He brought them the championship in his first year there. MTK also won that year's Super Cup trophy.

=== Vasas ===
A short stint in charge of Vasas SC then followed, before he packed his bags once more and headed back to Kuwait.

=== Al-Salmiya ===
He took the Al Salmiya Club to third spot and also managed to help them finish in the top 4 of the GCC cup.

=== Győr ===
In 2007, Egervári headed to Győr, in Hungary, and took this club from close to bottom of the league to third spot, and qualification into the UEFA Cup. This was made even more special as it was the first time in 22 years that Győri ETO FC made it into Europe. He helped Győr beat Zestaponi of Georgia, over two legs, before meeting German giants VfB Stuttgart in the next round. His young Győr side suffered numerous injuries, with key captain Peter Stark, breaking his ribs, which resulted in him missing most of the season. Győr also suffered from fatigue after their involvement in the UEFA Cup, and the management of the club decided to do without his services in December 2008.

=== Hungary U-20 ===
Egervári spent a short period of six months out of the game, deciding to focus on improving his English language skills during that time. He did receive offers from clubs for his services, but felt that he needed to properly recharge his batteries. He then received an offer that he simply could not refuse. The then President of the Hungarian FA, Istvan Kisteleki, offered him the U20 national team manager's job, with little over a month before the 2009 FIFA U-20 World Cup finals in Egypt. He accepted, and began to work on his young squad with very little time allowed. Egervári once again proved his worth by guiding the little fancied Hungarians to a bronze medal position in the finals, which included big wins over the Italy national under-20 football team and Czech Republic national under-20 football team.He took on the additional role of U21 team manager and defeated the Italian U21 side in Hungary with a 2–0 win.

=== Hungary ===
The departure of Dutchman Erwin Koeman resulted in Egervári being the obvious choice to manage the full Hungary national side for the first time. He was officially appointed on 23 July 2010, with his first task being to take the Hungary national side to England for a friendly at Wembley Stadium on 11 August 2010. Once again he had been given the challenge of preparing his side with very little time, but as his success in Egypt with the U-20 side showed, he was more than up to the challenge.

In the Euro 2012 qualifying, Egervári debuted against Sweden by losing 2–0 in Stockholm on 3 September 2010. On home turf his debut was a 2–1 win against Moldova. In their third match the team crushed San Marino 8–0 at Puskás Ferenc Stadium. Their second away match was in Helsinki Olympic Stadium, where Ádám Szalai scored the opening goal. Mikael Forssell equalized the result in the 88th minute, but Hungary won the match on a late goal by Balázs Dzsudzsák in the 94th minute. In 2011 Hungary played their first match against Azerbaijan in Maktoum bin Rashid Al Maktoum, Dubai. In the 37th minute, Gergely Rudolf scored a goal. The second goal was scored by Tamás Hajnal in the 81st minute. Hungary beat Azerbaijan 2–0 in a friendly match. The first match in the Euro 2012 Qualifiers was against the Netherlands at home in the Puskás Ferenc Stadium on 25 March 2011. Hungary was beaten by 4–1 in front of 23,817 supporters. The second match was four days later on 29 March 2011. Hungary was beaten by 5–3 in a thrilling match. Gergely Rudolf scored the equalizer (1–1), Gera Zoltán scored the second Hungarian goal (1–2) and the third goal (3–3). Finally, the Netherlands beat Hungary 5–3 in the Amsterdam Arena. In March 2011, Hungary was third in their group. One of the most important success of Egervári's coaching career was the Euro 2012 qualifying between Hungary and Sweden. Due to the injuries of key people like Balázs Dzsudzsák, Roland Juhász, and Zoltán Gera, nobody expected a victory against Sweden. On 2 September 2011, Szabics scored against Sweden at the Puskás Ferenc Stadium in the last minutes of the first half. However, Sweden equalized in the second half. A late goal by Szabics's fellow striker Gergely Rudolf resulted the celebration of 25,000 spectators after beating Sweden in the Euro 2012 qualifying by 2–1.

On 11 October 2013, Egervári resigned immediately after an 8–1 defeat against the Netherlands in Amsterdam in a penultimate game in the FIFA World Cup 2014 qualifying round, in which Hungary had the chance of securing a second place in Group D that could have entitled it to play-off games. He was remembered for the renaissance of modern Hungarian football, and contributed for Hungary's later success in UEFA Euro 2016.

=== Diósgyőr ===
On 29 December 2015, he was appointed as the manager of Nemzeti Bajnokság I club Diósgyőri VTK.

== Filmography ==
- Escape to Victory (1981) - German Team Player (uncredited)

== Management award ==
Egervári has picked up many awards over his years as a top coach in both Hungary and the Middle East. He was manager of the year in 1996, 1999, 2000, 2001, 2003 and 2009.
