= 1986–87 Nemzeti Bajnokság I =

Nemzeti Bajnokság I
- Season: 1986–87
- Champions: MTK-VM
- Relegated: Dunaújvárosi Kohász; Eger
- European Cup: MTK-VM
- Cup Winners' Cup: Újpesti Dózsa
- UEFA Cup: Tatabányai Bányász; Budapest Honvéd
- Matches: 240
- Goals: 585 (2.44 per match)
- Top goalscorer: Lajos Détári (19)

Statistics of Nemzeti Bajnokság I in the 1986–87 season.

== Overview ==
It was contested by 16 teams, and MTK Hungária FC won the championship, breaking their 29-year long drought, under headcoach József Verebes. Although MTK started off the season with back-'to-back losses to Békéscsaba and Szombathelyi Haladás, and had to wait for their first win until round 4, the blue and whites went on a 5-; then a 6-game winning streak, only suffering 2 losses in the remainder of the campaign.

In April Tatabánya ended MTK's 11-game unbeaten streak in the league, defeating them 1-0. MTK's goalless draw against Fehérvár the following week allowed Újpest to take the first spot of the table. However, the purple and whites suffered two surprise defeats to Békéscsaba and Siófok, and eventually finished runners-up. MTK's status as champions was confirmed on the 7th of June, after they held Újpest to a 0-0 draw. This was MTK's 19th championship.

== League standings ==
Pos	Team	Pld	W	D	L	GF	GA	GD	Pts	Qualification or relegation
1	MTK-VM (C)	30	17	9	4	52	24	+28	43	Qualification for European Cup first round
2	Újpesti Dózsa	30	16	8	6	47	23	+24	40	Qualification for Cup Winners' Cup first round
3	Tatabányai Bányász	30	15	5	10	44	31	+13	35	Qualification for UEFA Cup first round
4	Budapest Honvéd	30	15	5	10	47	39	+8	35	Qualification for UEFA Cup first round
5	Ferencváros	30	10	13	7	33	27	+6	33	
6	Vasas	30	13	6	11	42	40	+2	32	
7	Pécs	30	12	7	11	30	25	+5	31	
8	Békéscsaba	30	10	11	9	32	34	−2	31	
9	Haladás	30	11	8	11	32	33	−1	30	
10	Győr	30	9	11	10	51	45	+6	29	
11	Zalaegerszeg	30	9	11	10	33	34	−1	29	
12	Debreceni MVSC	30	8	12	10	31	37	−6	28	
13	Siofoki Bányász	30	9	9	12	36	41	−5	27	
14	Videoton	30	7	9	14	26	37	−11	23	
15	Dunaújvárosi Kohász (R)	30	4	9	17	26	57	−31	17	Relegation to Nemzeti Bajnokság II
16	Eger (R)	30	4	9	17	23	58	−35	17	Relegation to Nemzeti Bajnokság II

Source: rsssf.com
(C) Champions; (R) Relegated

== Results ==
Home \ Away	BÉK	DEB	DUN	EGE	FTC	GYŐ	HAL	HON	MTK	PÉC	SIÓ	TAT	ÚJP	VAS	VID	ZTE
Békéscsaba		2–1	4–0	3–1	1–0	1–1	1–0	2–1	2–0	0–0	2–1	0–4	3–1	4–1	1–1	0–0
Debreceni MVSC	0–0		0–2	3–1	2–2	1–1	2–0	0–2	0–2	2–1	2–1	0–2	0–0	1–1	4–1	2–1
Dunaújvárosi Kohász	2–2	0–3		0–0	1–1	1–1	0–2	2–3	2–3	0–0	0–0	0–2	2–0	3–2	2–0	2–2
Eger	0–0	0–1	2–1		1–1	4–3	0–0	0–1	2–2	1–3	0–1	2–1	1–1	1–3	0–0	1–1
Ferencváros	1–0	0–0	2–1	3–1		1–1	1–1	2–3	0–0	1–0	3–2	2–0	0–0	3–1	1–0	3–0
Győr	6–1	1–1	1–1	2–1	4–1		3–0	1–2	2–3	4–1	2–1	3–0	1–1	2–2	1–1	1–1
Haladás	2–0	0–0	2–0	4–0	1–0	1–0		3–3	0–2	1–0	0–0	0–0	1–0	4–1	2–2	3–1
Budapest Honvéd	2–1	1–1	3–1	0–0	0–0	1–0	1–0		2–0	1–0	1–0	0–2	2–5	0–1	5–0	1–2
MTK-VM	3–0	1–1	3–1	6–1	0–0	3–3	1–2	2–0		2–0	2–0	3–1	0–0	2–0	2–0	1–0
Pécs	1–1	1–0	4–0	3–0	2–2	2–1	1–0	1–0	0–0		2–1	0–1	1–2	0–0	2–0	2–1
Siofoki Bányász	1–1	0–0	1–0	3–1	1–0	3–1	3–1	2–4	2–2	0–2		2–2	1–2	0–2	0–2	2–2
Tatabányai Bányász	2–0	2–0	3–1	2–1	1–2	2–0	1–0	3–3	1–0	0–1	2–2		2–3	3–1	1–0	0–0
Újpesti Dózsa	0–0	4–0	2–0	5–0	1–0	2–1	4–0	2–1	0–1	1–0	0–1	0–2		2–0	2–1	4–0
Vasas	1–0	1–1	5–0	4–0	1–0	0–1	2–1	2–1	1–4	0–0	1–2	3–2	1–1		2–0	2–0
Videoton	0–0	4–2	1–1	0–1	1–1	2–3	3–0	2–0	0–0	1–0	1–2	1–0	0–1	2–0		0–0
Zalaegerszeg	1–0	3–1	3–0	1–0	0–0	4–0	1–1	2–3	1–2	2–0	1–1	1–0	1–1	0–1	1–0	

Source: rsssf.com
Legend: Blue = home team win; Yellow = draw; Red = away team win.

== Statistical leaders ==
=== Top goalscorers ===
Rank	Scorer	Club	Goals
1	(Hungary) Lajos Détári	Budapest Honvéd	19
2	(Hungary) György Szeibert	MTK-VM	17
2	(Hungary) István Vincze	Tatabányai Bányász	17
4	(Hungary) Sándor Rostás	Újpesti Dózsa	16
5	(Hungary) Lázár Szentes	Győri ETO FC	15
6	(Hungary) József Dzurják	Ferencvárosi TC	13
7	(Hungary) József Kiprich	Tatabányai Bányász	10
7	(Hungary) Zoltán Péter	Zalaegerszegi TE	10
9	(Hungary) Zsolt Bücs	Debreceni MVSC	9
9	(Hungary) Béla Mörtel	Debreceni MVSC	9

== Attendances ==
No.	Club	Average
1	Ferencváros	19,420
2	Békéscsaba	9,667
3	Haladás	8,733
4	Győr	8,500
5	Pécs	8,500
6	Vasas	8,187
7	Újpest	8,100
8	MTK	7,467
9	Honvéd	7,028
10	Zalaegerszeg	6,880
11	Debrecen	5,600
12	Tatabánya Bányász	5,533
13	Videoton	5,267
14	Siófok	5,100
15	Dunaújváros	4,536
16	Eger	4,200
