= Tamás Lucsánszky =

Football team manager (b. 1966)

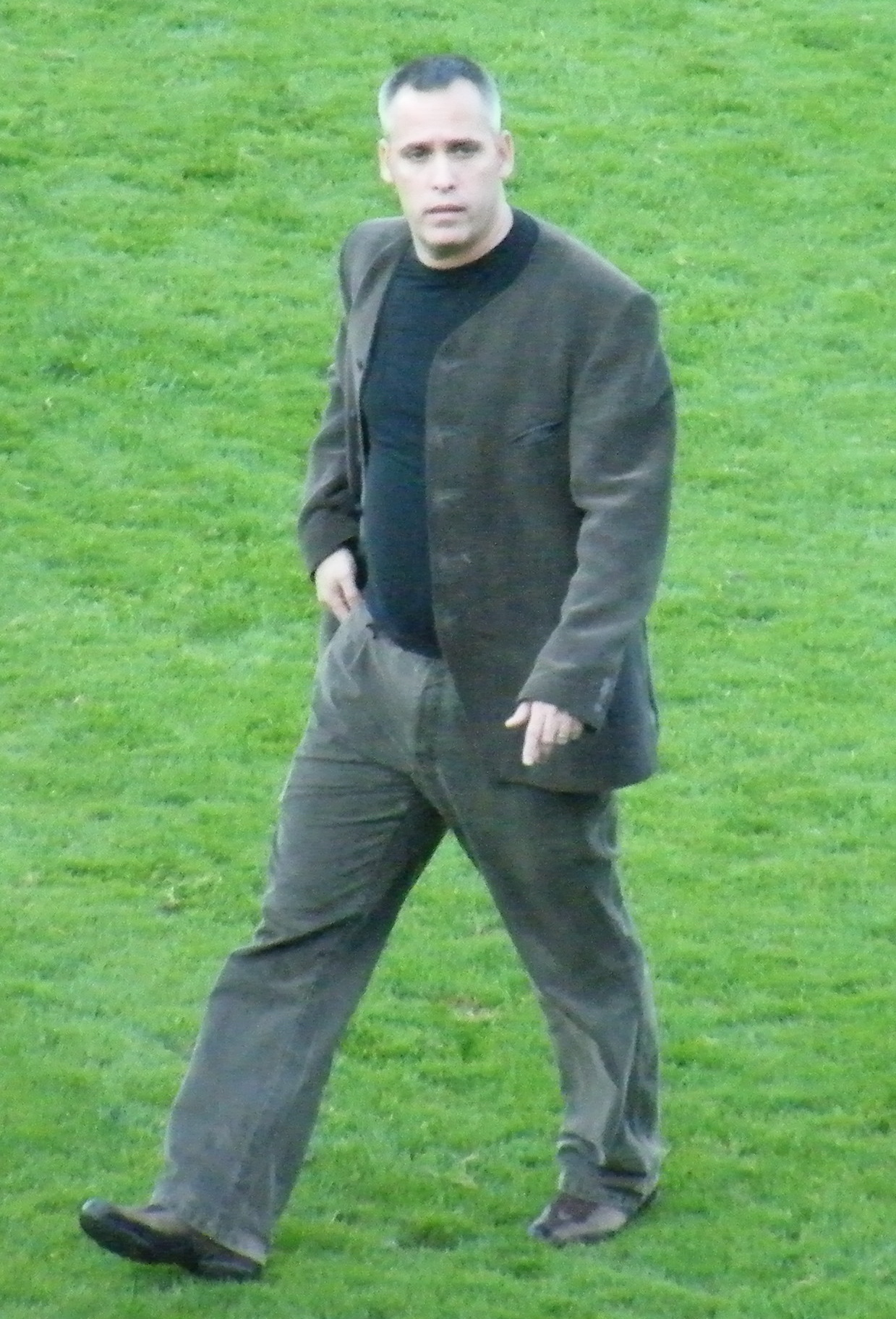

Personal information
- Full name: Tamás Lucsánszky
- Date of birth: May 1, 1966 (age 60)
- Place of birth: Hungary

Team information
- Current team: MTK Budapest

Managerial career
- Years: Team
- 2005–12: Budaörs
- 2013–14: Nyíregyháza
- 2015: Mezőkövesd
- 2015–17: Soroksár
- 2017–18: Nyíregyháza
- 2019: Ferencváros, youth team
- 2019: MTK Budapest

Tamás Lucsánszky is a Hungarian football manager. He is currently the manager of MTK Budapest FC in the Nemzeti Bajnokság I.

== Managerial career ==
=== Nyíregyháza ===
On 16 June 2017, it was announced that Lucsánszky is going to be the manager of Nyíregyháza.

=== MTK Budapest ===
On 12 March 2019 he was appointed as the manager of the Nemzeti Bajnokság I club MTK Budapest after Tamás Feczkó's removal. In an interview with the club, Lucsánszky said that he had been working for 20 years to get this opportunity. He also admitted that he is an MTK supporter. His first ever Nemzeti Bajnokság I match ended with a 3–2 defeat against Puskás Akadémia FC at the Pancho Aréna on the 25th match day of the 2018–19 Nemzeti Bajnokság I. On 24 May 2019, he was sacked after MTK were relegated to Nemzeti Bajnokság II.

== Managerial record ==
As of 12 March 2019

Team	From	To	Record								
Team	From	To	P	W	D	L	GF	GA	GD	Win %	Ref
MTK Budapest	12 March 2019	23 May 2019	9	1	0	8	8	19	−11	11.11	
Total			0	0	0	0	0	0	+0	—	—
