= 1959 Mitropa Cup =

Tournament details
- Dates: 4 July – 9 September 1959
- Teams: 8

Final positions
- Champions: (Hungary) Honvéd (1st title)
- Runners-up: (Hungary) MTK

Tournament statistics
- Matches played: 14
- Goals scored: 59 (4.21 per match)

The 1959 Mitropa Cup was the 19th season of the Mitropa Cup and was held from 4 July to 9 September. Honvéd won their first title after beating MTK in the two-legged final 6–5 on aggregate.

== Quarter-finals ==
Team 1	Agg.	Team 2	1st leg	2nd leg
Wiener (Austria)	2–8	(Hungary) Honvéd	2–1	0–7
MTK (Hungary)	7–4	(Czechoslovakia) Dynamo Prague	5–0	2–4
Vojvodina (Socialist Federal Republic of Yugoslavia)	4–3	(Austria) First Vienna	1–0	3–3
Baník Ostrava (Czechoslovakia)	3–4	(Socialist Federal Republic of Yugoslavia) Partizan	1–1	2–3

== Semi-finals ==
Team 1	Agg.	Team 2	1st leg	2nd leg
MTK (Hungary)	2–1	(Socialist Federal Republic of Yugoslavia) Vojvodina	2–1	0–0
Partizan (Socialist Federal Republic of Yugoslavia)	5–5	(Hungary) Honvéd	3–3	2–2

== Finals ==
Team 1	Agg.	Team 2	1st leg	2nd leg
Honvéd (Hungary)	6–5	(Hungary) MTK	4–3	2–2

1959 Mitropa Cup Champions

Honvéd
1st Title
