= József Garami =

Hungarian footballer and manager (1939–2025)

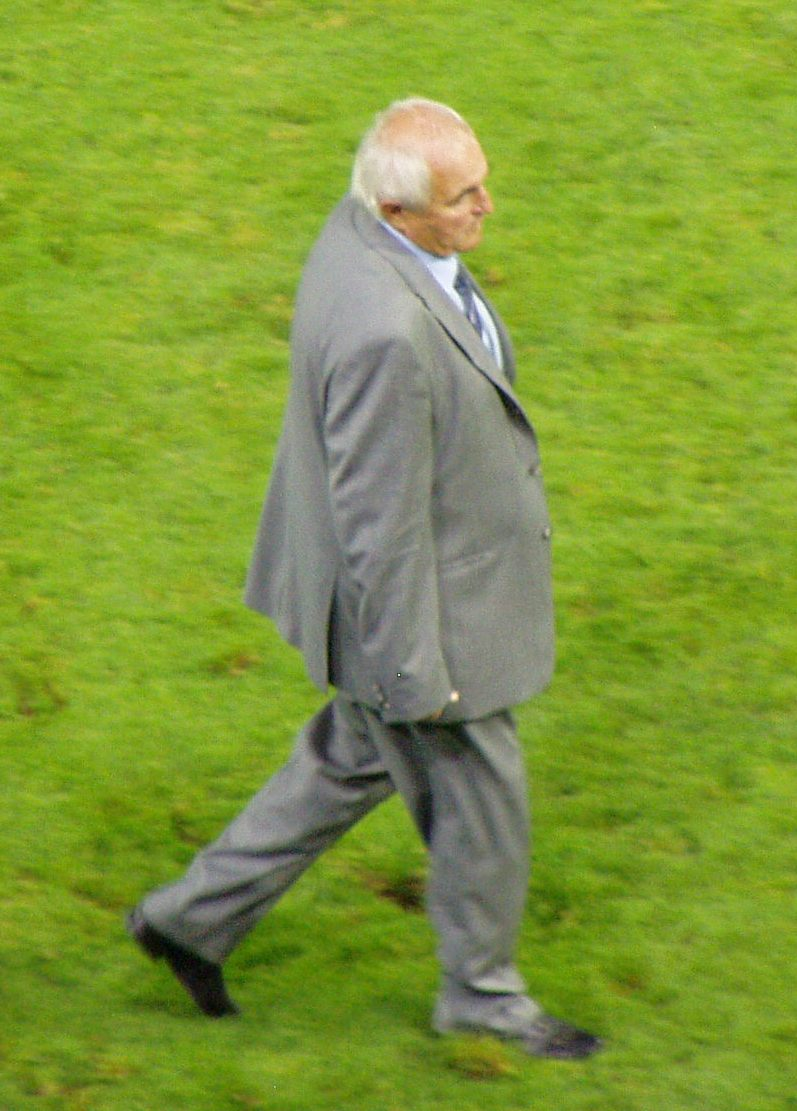

Personal information
- Date of birth: 9 August 1939
- Place of birth: Pécs, Hungary
- Date of death: 19 April 2025 (aged 85)
- Place of death: Pécs, Hungary
- Position: Forward

Senior career*
Years	Team	Apps	(Gls)
1953–1963	Pécsi Dózsa	38	(9)
1964	Pécsi Vasutas SK		
1965	Komlói Bányász SK	1	(0)
1966–67	Pécsi Vasutas SK		

Managerial career
- 1973–1985: Pécsi MSC, youth
- 1985–1992: Pécsi MFC
- 1987: Hungary
- 1993–1996: Újpest
- 1996–1998: MTK Budapest
- 1999–2001: Győri ETO FC
- 2002–2003: Ferencváros
- 2004–2015: MTK Budapest
- 2015–2019: MTK Budapest (professional director)
- 2020–: Pécsi MFC (professional coordinator)
- * Club domestic league appearances and goals

József Garami (née Glück; 9 August 1939 – 19 April 2025) was a Hungarian football player and manager who played as a forward.

== Managerial career ==
=== Hungary ===
On 9 September 1987, Garami coached the Hungary national team in a 2–0 loss against Scotland in Glasgow. He led the team for four more matches, including two victories over Greece and Cyprus in the Euro 1988 qualifiers.

=== MTK Budapest ===
Garami won the 1996–97 Nemzeti Bajnokság I with MTK Budapest. He repeated his success with the MTK Budapest by winning 2007-08 season.

== Personal life and death ==
The youth academy of Pécsi MFC was named after him in 2019.

Garami died in Pécs, Hungary on 19 April 2025, at the age of 85.
