= Béla Révész =

Hungarian footballer

Personal information
- Date of birth: 9 February 1886
- Place of birth: Budapest, Austria-Hungary
- Date of death: 19 July 1939 (aged 53)
- Place of death: Tarcea, Romania

International career
Years	Team	Apps	(Gls)
- Hungary

Béla Révész (9 February 1886 – 19 July 1939) was a Hungarian footballer. He played in seven matches for the Hungary national football team between 1909 and 1915.
