= Tamás Feczkó =

Hungarian football manager

Personal information
- Date of birth: 8 September 1977 (age 49)
- Place of birth: Nyíregyháza, Hungary

Managerial career
- Years: Team
- 2015–2017: Balmazújváros
- 2017–2019: MTK Budapest
- 2019–2020: Diósgyőri VTK
- 2021–2022: Nyíregyháza
- 2023–2024: Kisvárda
- 2024–2026: Honvéd

Tamás Feczkó (born 8 September 1977) is a Hungarian football manager. He is the manager of Diósgyőri VTK in the Nemzeti Bajnokság II.

== Managerial career ==
=== Diósgyőr ===
On 4 September 2019, he was appointed as the manager of the Nemzeti Bajnokság I club Diósgyőri VTK replacing the Spanish manager Fernando Fernández.

=== Kisvárda ===
On 8 November 2023, he was appointed as the manager of Kisvárda FC. On 6 August 2024, he resigned.

He was appointed as the director of international relations on 25 October 2024.

=== Honvéd ===
On 19 December 2024, he was appointed as the manager of Budapest Honvéd FC. Although he got promoted with Honvéd, he was sacked at the end of the 2025–26 Nemzeti Bajnokság II season.
