= MTK Budapest FC =

Hungarian football club

MTK Budapest
- Full name: Magyar Testgyakorlók Köre Budapest Futball Club
- Short name: MTK
- Founded: 16 November 1888; 137 years ago
- Ground: Hidegkuti Nándor Stadion
- Capacity: 5,322
- Chairman: Tamás Deutsch
- Manager: Máté Pinezits
- League: NB I
- 2025–26: NB I, 10th of 12
- Website: mtkbudapest.hu
Home colours	Away colours

Magyar Testgyakorlók Köre Budapest Futball Club, often abbreviated to MTK, is a professional football club based in Budapest, Hungary. The club currently plays in the Nemzeti Bajnokság I. The club's colours are blue and white. As one of the most successful Hungarian football clubs, MTK has won the Hungarian League 23 times and the Hungarian Cup 12 times. The club has also won the Hungarian Super Cup twice. In 1955, as Vörös Lobogó SE, they became the first Hungarian team to play in the European Cup and in 1964 they finished as runners-up in the European Cup Winners' Cup after losing to Sporting Clube de Portugal in the final.

The club founded the Sándor Károly Football Academy in 2001. The Academy also has a partnership agreement with English club Liverpool. MTK was established by the Hungarian Jewish community.

== History ==
MTK Budapest first entered the Nemzeti Bajnokság in the 1903 season. In the subsequent season, MTK won their first domestic title. Between 1913 and 1914 and 1924–25, MTK dominated Hungarian football by winning ten titles in a row.

== Club identity and supporters ==
MTK Budapest was founded on 16 November 1888 by members of Budapest’s assimilated Jewish middle class as Magyar Testgyakorlók Köre (“Circle of Hungarian Body‐Trainers”). Right from its foundation, MTK Budapest sought to promote “universal Hungarianhood” and modern athletics free from local or conservative constraints, and deliberately cast itself as a modern, cosmopolitan alternative to local, parochial clubs in Hungary. From its earliest years, the club drew support from Budapest’s downtown bourgeoisie and assimilated Jewish community, positioning itself in cultural opposition to local rivals like Ferencváros, whose fan identity emerged more from working- and lower-middle-class districts. From the 1890s through the 1930s, MTK emerged as one of Hungary’s dominant teams, winning multiple national titles. Its historic rivalry with Ferencváros (whose supporters had increasingly embraced right-wing, nationalist and antisemitic sentiments) accentuated MTK’s reputation as the “Jewish” or liberal club in Budapest.

Immediately after World War 2 in 1949, under Hungary’s new Communist regime, MTK was forcibly taken over by the ÁVH state security service and underwent a series of name changes; from Textiles SE (1950) to Bástya SE (1951) and Vörös Lobogó SE (1952), that aligned it with Stalinist state institutions. Although the club achieved on-field success during this era, winning multiple league titles and becoming the first Hungarian side to play in the European Cup (1955), its links to the secret police alienated most of its traditional fan base and massively disrupted the emotional bonds between club and supporters, a situation which lasted well beyond the Stalinist period.

Since the early 2000s however, MTK’s supporter culture has remained notably free of any far-right influence, standing in sharp contrast to several other Hungarian clubs. A 2021 study confirmed that, among major Hungarian teams, MTK’s fanbase is one of the few without significant extremist elements, reinforcing its longstanding image as the city’s liberal, most cosmopolitan side.

== Crest and colours ==
=== Manufacturers and shirt sponsors ===
The following table shows in detail MTK Budapest FC kit manufacturers and shirt sponsors by year:

Period	Kit manufacturer	Shirt sponsor
−2007	Nike	Fotex
2007–2008	Nike	Fotex / Sándor Károly Akadémia
2008–2009	Nike	Sándor Károly Akadémia
2009–2010	Nike	Duna Takarék / Sándor Károly Akadémia
2010–2011	Nike	Duna Takarék
2011–2012	Nike	Duna Takarék / Sándor Károly Akadémia
2012–2013	Nike	Országos Kéktúra
2013–2017	Nike	panzi pet
2017–2018	Nike	Work Service
2018–present	Nike	Prohuman

== Stadia and facilities ==
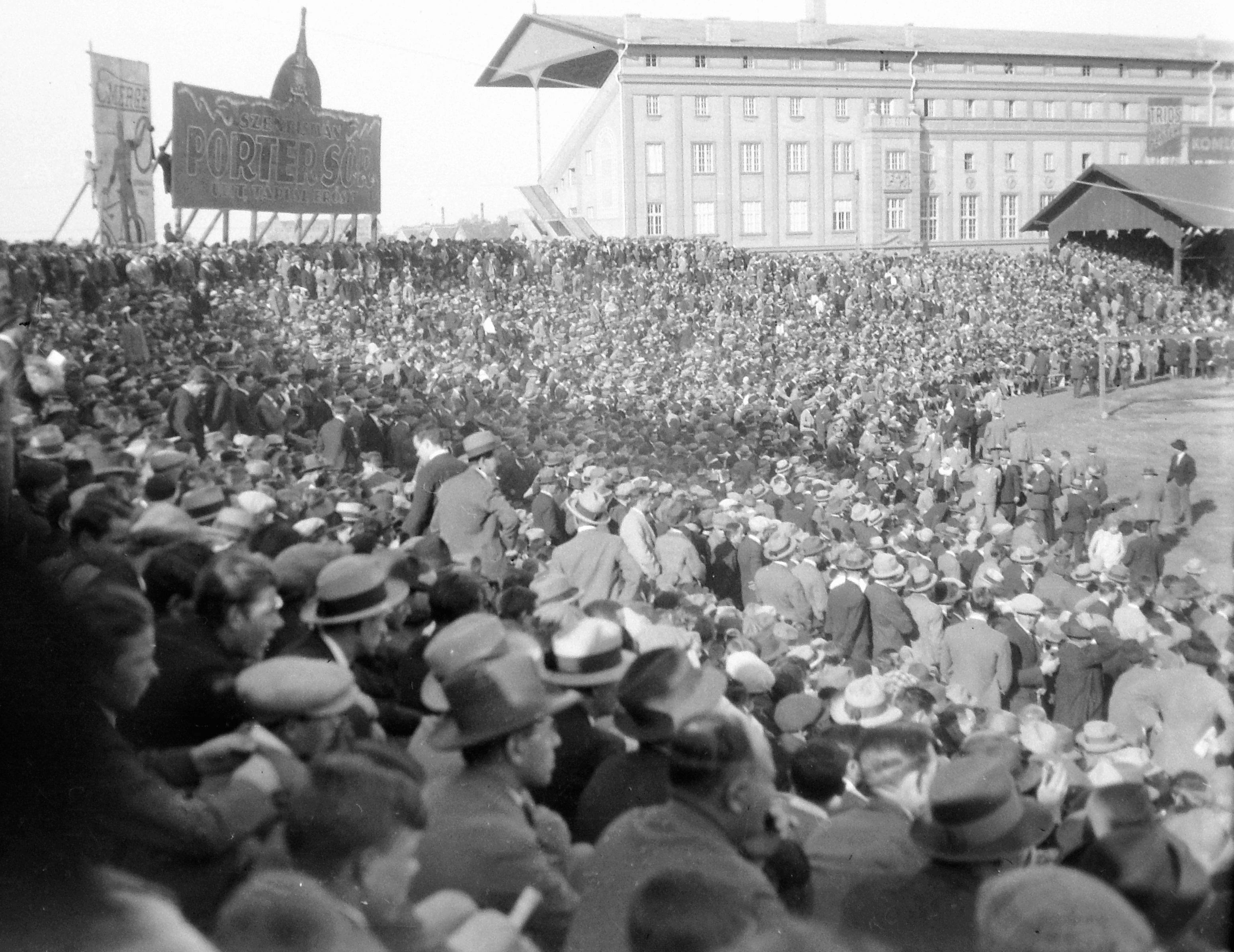
Hidegkuti Nándor Stadion (1947)

MTK Budapest's first stadium was opened in 1912. The first match it hosted was against MTK Budapest's main rival Ferencváros on 31 March 1912. The final result was 1–0 to MTK.

MTK Budapest's second stadium was built in 1947 shortly after the end of the World War II. The club remained there until 2014, when it was demolished in order to construct a brand new stadium on its place.

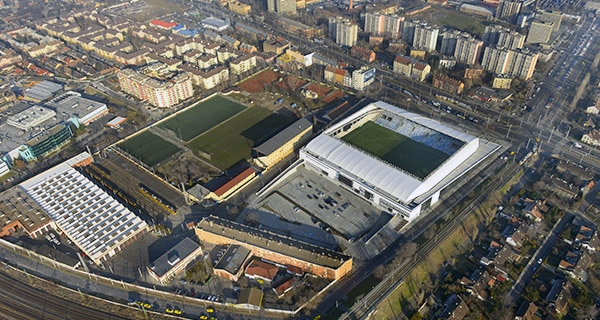
The newly built stadium

Hidegkuti Nándor Stadion is a multi-purpose stadium in Budapest, Hungary. It was renamed after the famous MTK Budapest and Hungary footballer Nándor Hidegkuti.

Lantos Mihály Sportközpont is a multi sport centre located in Zugló, Budapest. It was built in 1896. It has a capacity of 3,500 (2,500 seated).It was home to Budapest Micro Club, MTK Maccabi, Rower-Veled Érted Se, Vörös Meteor Egyetértés SK, Zuglói Kinizsi SE.

== Rivalry ==
The fixture between MTK Budapest FC and Ferencvárosi TC is called the Örökrangadó or Eternal derby. The first fixture was played in the 1903 Nemzeti Bajnokság I season. It is the oldest football rivalry in Hungary.

== Honours ==
=== Domestic ===
- Nemzeti Bajnokság I
  - Winners (23): 1904, 1907–08, 1913–14, 1916–17, 1917–18, 1918–19, 1919–20, 1920–21, 1921–22, 1922–23, 1923–24, 1924–25, 1928–29, 1935–36, 1936–37, 1951, 1953, 1957–58, 1986–87, 1996–97, 1998–99, 2002–03, 2007–08
  - Runners-up (20): 1909–10, 1910–11, 1911–12, 1912–13, 1925–26, 1927–28, 1930–31, 1932–33, 1939–40, 1948–49, 1950, 1952, 1954, 1955, 1957, 1958–59, 1962–63, 1989–90, 1999–2000, 2006–07
- Nemzeti Bajnokság II
  - Winners (5): 1981–82, 1994–95, 2011–12, 2017–18, 2019–20
- Magyar Kupa
  - Winners (12): 1909–10, 1910–11, 1911–12, 1913–14, 1922–23, 1924–25, 1931–32, 1951–52, 1968, 1996–97, 1997–98, 1999–2000
  - Runners-up (3): 1934–35, 1975–76, 2011–12
- Szuperkupa
  - Winners (3): 1997, 2003, 2008

=== International ===
- Mitropa Cup
  - Winners (2): 1955, 1963
  - Runners-up (1): 1959
- European Cup Winners' Cup
  - Runner-up (1): 1963–64
- Inter-Cities Fairs Cup
  - Semi-finalist (1): 1961–62

=== Friendly ===
- Štefánik Tournament in Bratislava
  - Winners (1): 1933
- Teide Trophy
  - Winners (1): 1975

== Seasons ==
=== League positions ===
As of 12 July 2025

== Players ==
=== Current squad ===
As of 10 October 2026

Note: Flags indicate national team as defined under FIFA eligibility rules; some limited exceptions apply. Players may hold more than one non-FIFA nationality.

No.	Pos.	Nation	Player
1	GK	HUN	Patrik Demjén
2	DF	HUN	Benedek Varju
4	DF	GEO	Ilia Beriashvili
5	DF	HUN	Dániel Horváth
6	MF	HUN	Mihály Kata (captain)
7	FW	HUN	Dániel Zsóri
8	MF	HUN	Ádám Zubor
9	FW	HUN	Milán Klausz
10	MF	HUN	István Bognár
11	FW	HUN	Gábor Jurek
12	GK	HUN	Marcell Mácsik
13	DF	HUN	Timóteus Mikolay
16	MF	HUN	Krisztián László

No.	Pos.	Nation	Player
17	MF	HUN	Kristóf Hinora
20	FW	HUN	Zalán Kerezsi
22	GK	HUN	József Balázs
24	GK	HUN	Tamás Fadgyas
26	DF	LTU	Vilius Armalas
27	DF	HUN	Patrik Kovács
29	MF	HUN	Soma Szuhodovszki
30	MF	HUN	Sámuel Bakó
37	FW	HUN	Ádám Nyers
43	GK	HUN	Bence Varga
55	DF	CRO	Stipe Radić
77	FW	HUN	György Komáromi (on loan from (Slovenia) Maribor)
80	MF	SLO	Adrian Zeljković (on loan from (Czech Republic) Viktoria Plzeň)

=== Out on loan ===
Note: Flags indicate national team as defined under FIFA eligibility rules; some limited exceptions apply. Players may hold more than one non-FIFA nationality.

No.	Pos.	Nation	Player
18	DF	HUN	Csaba Belényesi (at Paksi FC until 30 June 2027)
—	MF	HUN	Sámuel Major (at Spartak Varna until 30 June 2027)
—	FW	HUN	Patrik Szűcs (at Kozármisleny until 30 June 2027)

== Non-playing staff ==
=== Board of directors ===
Position	Name
President	(Hungary) Tamás Deutsch
Club director	(Hungary) (Denmark) József Jakobsen
President of committee	(Hungary) Iván Serényi
Member of the presidency	(Hungary) Péter Deutsch
Member of the presidency	(Hungary) János Somogyi
Member of the presidency	(Hungary) László Domonyai
Member of the supervising committee	(Hungary) István Molnár
Member of the supervising committee	(Hungary) Péter Stern
Member of the supervising committee	(Hungary) István Putics

=== Management ===
Position	Name
Head coach	(Hungary) Máté Pinezits
Assistant coach	(Hungary) Tamás Petres
Goalkeeper coach	(Hungary) József Andrusch
Fitness coach	(Hungary) András Szabó
Masseur	(Hungary) János Kiss
Masseur	(Hungary) István Dömök
Club doctor	(Hungary) Imre Dreissiger
Club doctor	(Hungary) Dániel Kincses
Technical manager	(Hungary) Mihály Horváth
Physiotherapist	(Hungary) Péter Sipos
Kit Manager	(Hungary) Gábor Máté

== See also ==
- List of MTK Budapest FC managers
- List of MTK Budapest FC seasons
- MTK Budapest FC in European football
- Örökrangadó
- Vörös Meteor Egyetértés SK

== Sources ==
- Behind The Curtain – Travels in Eastern European Football: Jonathan Wilson (2006) Behind the Curtain: Travels in Football in Eastern Europe: Amazon.co.uk: Wilson, Jonathan: 9780752869070: Books
