= 2013 Magyar Kupa final =

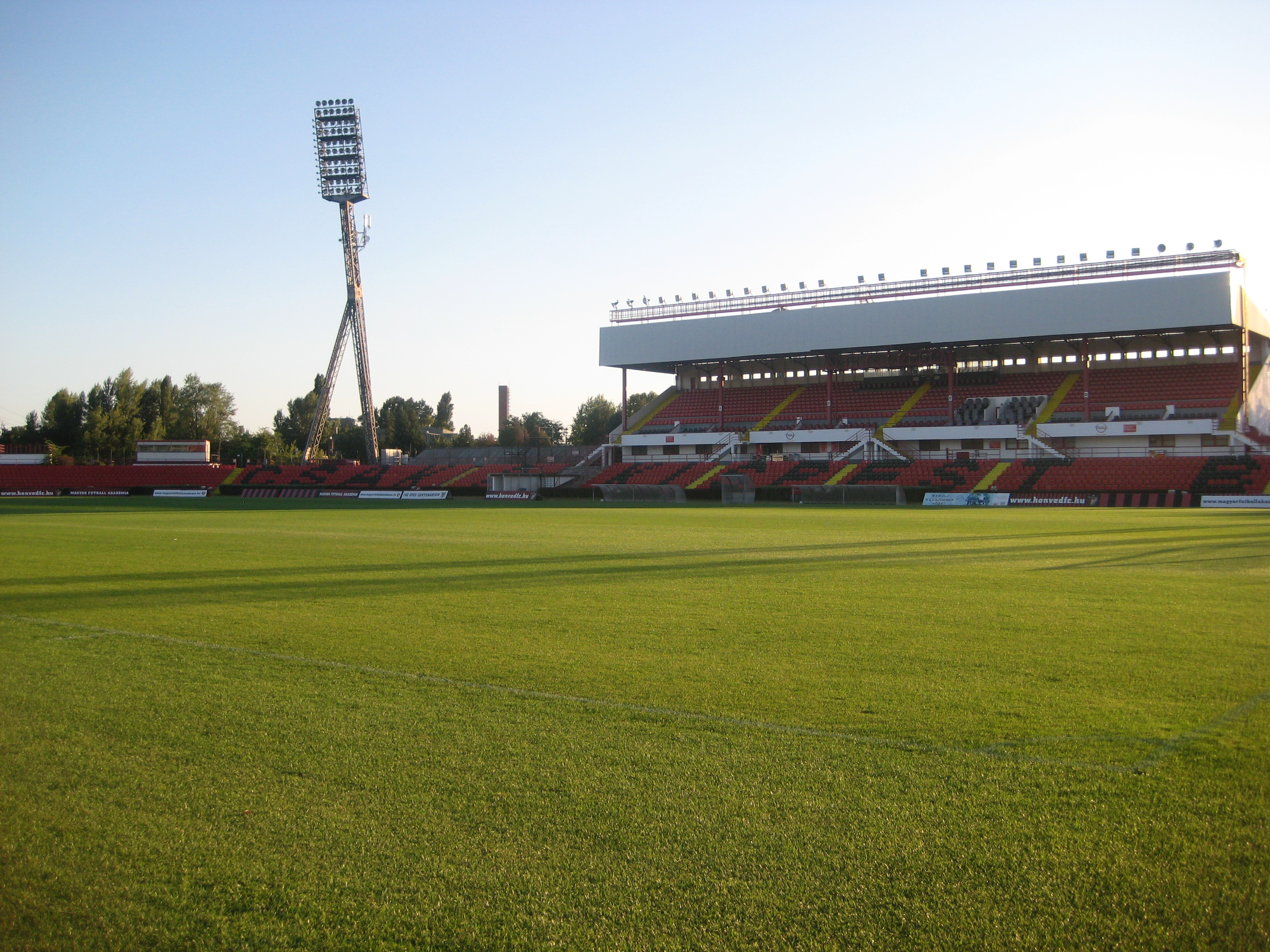
- Bozsik Stadion hosted the final
- Event: 2012–13 Magyar Kupa
Debrecen	Győr
2	1
- Date: 22 May 2013
- Venue: Bozsik Stadion, Budapest
- Referee: Viktor Kassai
- Attendance: 4,500

The Magyar Kupa final was the final match of the 2012–13 Magyar Kupa, played between Debrecen and Győr.

== Teams ==
Team	Previous finals appearances (bold indicates winners)
Debrecen	7 (**1999**, **2001**, 2003, 2007, **2008**, **2010**, **2012**)
Győr	7 (1964, **1965**, **1966**, **1967**, **1979**, 1984, 2009)

== Route to the final ==
Debrecen			Round	Győr
Opponent	Result	Legs		Opponent	Result	Legs
			Round 2	Babóti	12–0
Szentlőrinc	3–1		Round 3	Bölcskei	5–2
Nyíregyháza Spartacus	5–4	2–3 away; 3–1 home	Round of 16	Paks	7–2	4–0 home; 3–2 away
Létavértes	10–0	2–0 away; 8–0 home	Quarterfinals	Honvéd	3–0	1–0 away; 2–0 home
Vasas	6–1	3–0 away; 3–1 home	Semifinals	Videoton	3–2	2–0 away; 1–2 home

== Match ==
22 May 2013
20:00 CEST

Debrecen	2–1	Győr
Coulibaly 51', 86'	Report	Andrić

Bozsik Stadion, Budapest
Attendance: 4,500
Referee: Viktor Kassai

**Debrecen**	**Győr**

GK	(Hungary) István Verpecz
DF	(Hungary) Péter Máté
DF	(Hungary) Csaba Bernáth
DF	(Hungary) Norbert Mészáros
DF	(Hungary) Mihály Korhut
MF	(Hungary) Péter Czvitkovics (substituted off) 81'
MF	(Honduras) Luis Ramos (yellow card) 19'
MF	(Hungary) Ádám Bódi
MF	(Hungary) János Ferenczi (substituted off) 68'
FW	(France) Adamo Coulibaly
FW	(Hungary) Tamás Kulcsár (substituted off) 40'
Substitutes:
GK	(Hungary) Gergő Szécsi
DF	(Hungary) István Szűcs
MF	(France) Selim Bouadla (substituted on) 81'
MF	(Hungary) István Spitzmüller
MF	(Hungary) Tibor Dombi
FW	(Senegal) Ibrahima Sidibe (substituted on) 40'
FW	(Hungary) Márk Szécsi (substituted on) 68'
Manager:
(Hungary) Elemér Kondás

GK	(Slovakia) Péter Molnár
DF	(Hungary) Ákos Takács (yellow card) 90+3'
DF	(Hungary) Zoltán Lipták (substituted off) 81'
MF	(Czech Republic) Michal Švec
MF	(Serbia) Nikola Trajković (yellow card) 47' (substituted off) 62'
MF	(Hungary) Máté Pátkai
MF	(Hungary) Dániel Völgyi
MF	(Bosnia and Herzegovina) Đorđe Kamber
MF	(Serbia) Nemanja Andrić
FW	(Estonia) Tarmo Kink
FW	(Hungary) Roland Varga (substituted off) 32'
Substitutes:
GK	(Slovakia) Ľuboš Kamenár
DF	(Serbia) Vladimir Đorđević (substituted on) 81'
MF	(Slovenia) Rok Kronaveter (substituted on) 32'
MF	(Hungary) Ádám Dudás (substituted on) 62'
MF	(Lithuania) Linas Pilibaitis
MF	(Croatia) Marko Dinjar
FW	(Georgia (country)) Giorgi Kvilitaia
Manager:
(Hungary) Attila Pintér
