= 2020 Magyar Kupa final =

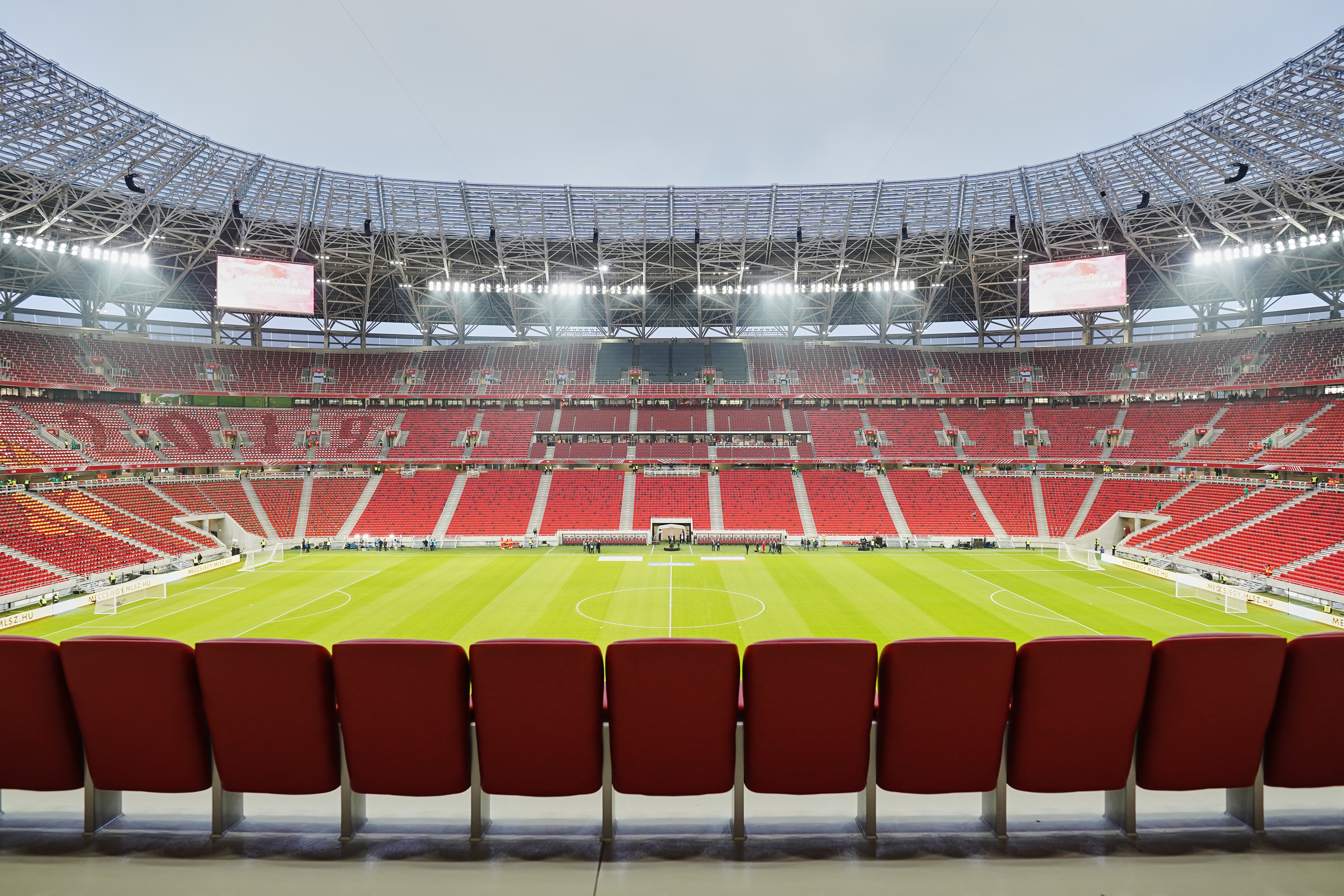
- The Puskás Aréna in Budapest hosted the final.
- Event: 2019–20 Magyar Kupa
Honvéd	Mezőkövesd
2	1
- Date: 3 June 2020
- Venue: Puskás Aréna, Budapest
- Referee: Tamás Bognár
- Attendance: 10,000 (Note: The total capacity of the stadium was 10,000 spectators were seated following strict regulations after COVID-19 pandemic.)

The 2020 Magyar Kupa final was the final match of the 2019–20 Magyar Kupa, played between Budapesti Honvéd and Mezőkövesd on 3 June 2020 at the Puskás Aréna in Budapest, Hungary.

== Teams ==
Team	Previous finals appearances (bold indicates winners)
Honvéd	17 (**1926**, 1955, **1964**, 1968, 1969, 1973, 1983, **1985**, 1988, **1989**, 1994, **1996**, 2004, **2007**, 2008, **2009**, 2019)
Mezőkövesd	None

== Match ==
=== Details ===
3 June 2020
20:00 CEST

Honvéd	2–1	Mezőkövesd
Kamber 33', 56'	Report	Pekár 37'

Puskás Aréna, Budapest
Attendance: 10,000
Referee: Tamás Bognár

**Honvéd**	**Mezőkövesd**
