= 2012 Magyar Kupa final =

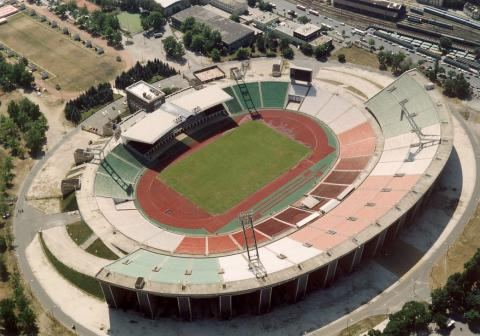
- Puskás Ferenc Stadion hosted the final
- Event: 2011–12 Magyar Kupa
MTK Budapest	Debrecen
3	3
- Debrecen won 8–7 on penalties
- Date: 1 May 2012
- Venue: Puskás Ferenc Stadion, Budapest
- Referee: Zsolt Szabó
- Attendance: 3,500

The Magyar Kupa final was the final match of the 2011–12 Magyar Kupa, played between MTK Budapest and Debrecen.

== Teams ==
Team	Previous finals appearances (bold indicates winners)
MTK Budapest	14 (**1910**, **1911**, **1912**, **1914**, **1923**, **1925**, **1932**, 1935, **1952**, **1968**, 1976, **1997**, **1998**, **2000**)
Debrecen	6 (**1999**, **2001**, 2003, 2007, **2008**, **2010**)

== Route to the final ==
MTK Budapest			Round	Debrecen
Opponent	Result	Legs		Opponent	Result	Legs
Rákospalota	4–0		Round 3	Kazincbarcika	5–1
Balmazújváros	2–1		Round 4	Cegléd	2–0
Pécsi MFC	2–2 (a)	0–1 home; 2–1 away	Round of 16	Kecskemét	3–2	2–1 away; 1–1 home
Békéscsaba	6–0	3–0 away; 3–0 home	Quarterfinals	Kaposvár	1–0	1–0 away; 0–0 home
Videoton	4–3	2–3 home; 2–0 away	Semifinals	Újpest	5–2	2–1 home; 3–1 away

== Match ==
1 May 2012
18:00 CEST

MTK Budapest	3–3 (a.e.t.)	Debrecen
Könyves 45'; Ladányi 62'; Zsidai 87'	Report	Bouadla 51'; Szakály 55', 89'
Penalties
Vukmir (penalty scored); Zsidai (penalty scored); Vass (penalty scored); Wolfe (penalty missed); Kanta (penalty scored); Szekeres (penalty scored); Pál (penalty scored); Könyves (penalty scored); Kálnoki-Kis (penalty missed)	7–8	(penalty scored) Szakály; (penalty scored) Nagy; (penalty scored) Bouadla; (penalty scored) Lucas; (penalty missed) Coulibaly; (penalty scored) Korhut; (penalty scored) Šimac; (penalty scored) Varga; (penalty scored) Mészáros

Puskás Ferenc Stadion, Budapest
Attendance: 3,500
Referee: Zsolt Szabó

**MTK Budapest**	**Debrecen**

GK	(Hungary) Lajos Hegedűs
DF	(Hungary) Adrián Szekeres
DF	(Serbia) Dragan Vukmir (yellow card) 12'
DF	(Jamaica) Rafe Wolfe (yellow card) 71'
DF	(Hungary) Dávid Kálnoki-Kis
MF	(Hungary) Dániel Vadnai
MF	(Hungary) József Kanta (c)
MF	(Hungary) László Zsidai
MF	(Hungary) Tibor Ladányi (substituted off) 90+1'
FW	(Hungary) Ádám Balajti (substituted off) 55'
FW	(Hungary) Norbert Könyves
Substitutes:
GK	(Italy) Federico Groppioni
DF	(Hungary) András Gál
DF	(Hungary) Dávid Kelemen
MF	(Hungary) Patrik Vass (substituted on) 55'
MF	(Hungary) Sándor Hajdú
MF	(Australia) Sasa Macura
FW	(Hungary) András Pál (substituted on) 90+1'
Manager:
(Hungary) József Garami

GK	(Hungary) István Verpecz
DF	(Croatia) Dajan Šimac
DF	(Hungary) Norbert Mészáros
DF	(Hungary) Balázs Nikolov (red card) 60'
DF	(Hungary) Mihály Korhut (yellow card) 90+4'
MF	(Hungary) László Rezes (substituted off) 46'
MF	(Hungary) Péter Szakály (c)
MF	(Hungary) József Varga
MF	(Honduras) Luis Ramos (substituted off) 46'
FW	(Hungary) Tamás Kulcsár (substituted off) 62'
FW	(Brazil) Lucas
Substitutes:
GK	(Hungary) Miklós Erdélyi
DF	(Hungary) Zoltán Nagy (substituted on) 62' (yellow card) 80'
DF	(Hungary) Péter Máté
MF	(France) Selim Bouadla (substituted on) 46'
MF	(Hungary) Ádám Bódi
FW	(France) Adamo Coulibaly (substituted on) 46'
FW	(Gabon) Roguy Méyé
Manager:
(Hungary) Elemér Kondás
