= List of Győri ETO FC managers =

Győri ETO FC is a professional football club based in Győr, Hungary.

== Managers ==
Updated: 30 July 2026

Manager	Nationality	From	To	P	W	D	L	GF	GA	Win	Honours	Notes
Károly Fogl II †	Hungary	1 July 1937	30 June 1938									
József Lóránt †		1945	1946									
Béla Farkas †		1945	1946									
Lajos Remmer †												
Pál Horváth †		1947	1948									
Lajos Baróti †		1 July 1948	30 June 1952									
Ferenc Magyar †	Hungary	1952										
Imre Pál Kovács †	Hungary	1 July 1952	30 June 1954									
Rudolf Jeny †	Hungary	1955										
Imre Pál Kovács †	Hungary	1958	1959									
István Orczifalvi †	Hungary	1960	1962									
Ferenc Szusza †	Hungary	15 May 1962	30 July 1963								1963 Nemzeti Bajnokság I	
Nándor Hidegkuti †	Hungary	1963	1965								1965 Magyar Kupa	
Ferenc Szusza †	Hungary	30 October 1965	31 December 1968								1966 Magyar Kupa 1967 Magyar Kupa	
József Mészáros †	Hungary	1969	1971									
Ágoston Dombos †	Hungary	1970	1971									
László Győrfi †		1971	1972									
Ferenc Farsang †		1972	1975									
Antal Pálfy †		1975	1976									
Tibor Palicskó		1976	1978									
Imre Kovács		1 July 1978	30 June 1981								1978–79 Magyar Kupa	
József Verebes †		1981	1986								1981–82 NBI 1982–83 NBI	
Imre Gellei		1 July 1986	17 March 1987									
László Győrfi		1986	1988									
Sándor Haász		1988	1989									
Karol Pecze	(Czech Republic) Czechoslovakia	1 July 1989	2 December 1990	21	8	4	9	32	29			
Róbert Glázer	Hungary	13 December 1990	31 December 1991	30	7	12	11	30	39			
Lázár Szentes	Hungary	1 January 1992	15 July 1992	15	4	5	6	18	24			
Barnabás Tornyi	Hungary	15 July 1992	9 February 1993	15	3	6	6	13	19			
József Verebes †	Hungary	11 February 1993	1 December 1994	60	27	12	21	93	81			
László Győrfi	Hungary	17 February 1995	16 October 1995	25	8	7	10	38	35			
József Póczik	Hungary	18 October 1995	1 April 1996	8	1	1	6	6	18			
Sándor Haász	Hungary	3 April 1996	9 March 1997	31	10	8	13	38	50			
László Keglovich	Hungary	11 March 1997	30 June 1997	15	3	8	4	21	22			
István Reszeli Soós †	Hungary	1 June 1997	30 June 1999	68	34	20	14	100	70			
Károly Gergely	Hungary	1 July 1999	24 October 1999	10	3	4	3	13	8			
József Garami †	Hungary	25 October 1999	30 June 2001	23	9	5	9	40	29			
Zoltán Varga †	Hungary	21 April 2001	2 October 2001	12	2	4	6	14	20			
Zsolt Tamási	Hungary	2 October 2001	9 January 2003	50	21	13	16	84	81			
Zoltán Varga †	Hungary	22 January 2003	5 September 2003	8	2	3	3	7	12			
József Kiprich	Hungary	11 September 2003	4 December 2003	11	3	3	5	15	13			
István Reszeli Soós †	Hungary	17 December 2003	31 December 2005	52	22	10	20	73	79			
János Csank	Hungary	1 January 2006	10 July 2006	15	4	6	5	24	24			
János Pajkos	Hungary	11 July 2006	5 December 2006	16	5	5	6	22	22			
István Reszeli Soós (interim) †	Hungary	5 December 2006	11 December 2006									
István Klement		21 December 2006	15 June 2007	13	4	3	6	15	18			
Sándor Egervári		1 July 2007	8 December 2008	50	22	14	14	95	65			
Dragoljub Bekvalac	Serbia	1 January 2009	30 June 2009									
Attila Pintér		1 July 2009	6 March 2011	64	28	22	14	91	56			
Aurél Csertői	Hungary	7 March 2011	5 March 2012	35	19	9	7	69	42			
Attila Pintér	Hungary	6 March 2012	19 December 2013	72	43	14	15	131	77		2012–13 NBI	
Ferenc Horváth	Hungary	9 January 2014	31 October 2014	31	16	6	9	54	41			
Vasile Miriuță	Hungary Romania	24 November 2014	15 June 2015	14	5	4	5	20	20			
Zoltán Németh	Hungary	4 June 2015	2 November 2015									
Tamás Preszeller (caretaker)	Hungary	1 January 2016	1 April 2016									
Balázs Bekő	Hungary	11 April 2016	26 September 2017	13	5	2	6	18	19			
Lázár Szentes	Hungary	28 September 2017	22 June 2018	32	16	6	10	54	47			
Géza Mészöly	Hungary	22 June 2018	3 September 2018	7	2	2	3	11	10			
József Király	Hungary	11 September 2018	19 March 2019									
Miklós Herczeg	Hungary	20 March 2019	19 May 2019	9	6	1	2	15	9			
Gábor Boér	Hungary											
Elemér Kondás	Hungary	3 December 2019	29 March 2020	10	3	2	5	13	16			
Péter Tuifel	Hungary	1 July 2020	24 August 2020	5	0	3	2	5	8			
József Király		25 August 2020	1 September 2020	2								
Sándor Csató	Hungary	2 September 2020	21 March 2021	24	11	4	9	41	25			
Barna Dobos	Hungary	22 March 2021	1 June 2021	9	1	3	5	12	17			
László Klausz	Hungary	2 June 2021	20 June 2022	43	20	8	15	67	53			
Krisztián Timár	Hungary	30 June 2022	21 March 2023	31	12	9	10	36	28			
Antonio Muñoz	Spain	22 March 2023	24 February 2024	33	15	7	11	48	41			
Serhiy Kuznetsov	Ukraine Hungary	24 February 2024	24 April 2024	8	4	0	4	11	8			
Balázs Borbély	Hungary Slovakia	25 April 2024	23 May 2026	81	46	19	16	161	86		2025–26 NBI	
Efraín Juárez	Mexico	17 June 2026	present	5	1	3	1	11	8	20.00		
