= Lajos Baróti =

Hungarian footballer and coach

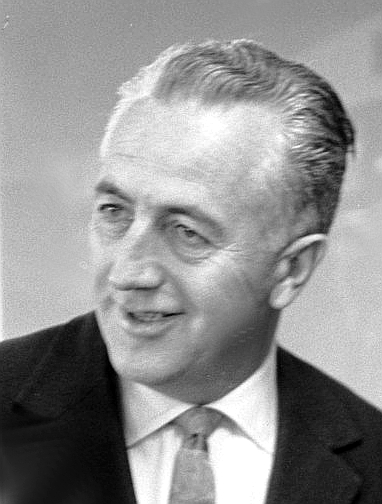
- Baróti in 1961

Personal information
- Full name: Lajos Baróti-Kratochfill
- Date of birth: 19 August 1914
- Place of birth: Szeged, Hungary
- Date of death: 23 December 2005 (aged 91)
- Position: Defender

Senior career*
Years	Team	Apps	(Gls)
1935–1946	Szegedi AK	170	(7)
1946–1948	Győri ETO	58	(2)
Total		228	(9)

International career
1939–1941	Hungary	2	(0)

Managerial career
- 1948–1952: Györi Vasas ETO
- 1952–1953: Budapesti Postás SE
- 1953–1957: Budapesti Vasas SC
- 1957–1966: Hungary
- 1967–1971: Újpesti Dózsa
- 1971–1972: Peru
- 1972–1974: Budapesti Vasas SC
- 1975–1978: Hungary
- 1979: SSW Innsbruck
- 1980–1982: Benfica
- * Club domestic league appearances and goals

Lajos Baróti (Hungarian pronunciation: [ˈlɒjoʃ ˈbɒroːti]; 19 August 1914 – 23 December 2005) was a Hungarian football player and manager. With eleven major titles he is one of the most outstanding coaches of his time.

== Career ==
Baróti played from 1928 until 1946 for Szegedi AK and from 1946 to 1948 Győri ETO. Between 1939 and 1941 he also played twice for the national team.

1957 he was appointed head coach of the national team. Until 1966 and between 1975 and 1978 he led the side through 117 matches. He led Hungary to the World Cups of 1958, 1962, 1966 and 1978, the Olympics of 1960 in Rome and the 1964 European Nations' Cup where the team finished third. The greatest success was winning the gold medal at the 1964 Olympics in Tokyo.

Between 1971 and 1972 he had a stint as coach of the Peruvian national team: in 1971 he led the Peru olympic team during the Pre-Olympic Tournament.

His most successful time as club coach was from 1967 and 1971 with Újpesti Dózsa in Budapest, where he laid the beginnings of the club's golden era. The front row consisting of Fazekas – Göröcs – Bene – Dunai II – Zámbó was one of the finest of the 1970s. He took the club to doubles of cup and championship in 1969 and 1970 as well as to a third consecutive championship in 1971, the first titles for the club in a decade. He also took the club to the finals of the Inter-Cities Fairs Cup of 1968–69 against Newcastle United, however losing there 0–3 and 2–3.

Baróti enjoyed further successes with Vasas SC, SSW Innsbruck in Austria and S.L. Benfica, there winning a Portuguese Supercup in 1980 and a double in 1981.

== Honours ==
=== Club ===
Vasas SC

- Nemzeti Bajnokság I: 1957
- Magyar Kupa: 1973

Újpesti Dózsa

- Nemzeti Bajnokság I: 1969, 1970, 1971
- Magyar Kupa: 1969, 1970

Innsbruck

- Austrian Cup: 1978–79

Benfica

- Primeira Liga: 1980–81
- Taça de Portugal: 1980–81

=== International ===
Hungary

- 1964 Summer Olympics gold medal: 1964

== See also ==
- National team managers with 100 or more matches

Preceded by (Portugal) Mário Wilson	Cup of Portugal Winning Coach; 1980–81	Succeeded by (England) Malcolm Allison
