= Magyar Kupa =

Hungarian cup competition for football clubs

MOL Magyar Kupa
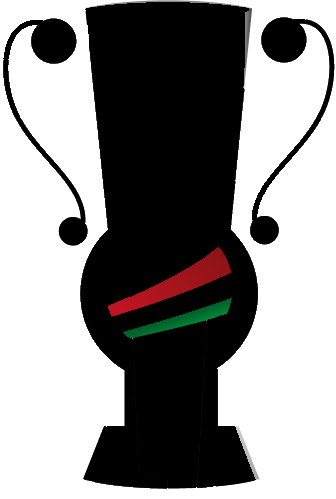
- Organiser(s): MLSZ
- Founded: 1909; 117 years ago
- Region: Hungary
- Teams: 128 (Main round)
- Qualifier for: UEFA Europa League
- Current champions: Ferencváros (25th title)
- Most championships: Ferencváros (25 titles)
- Broadcaster: M4 Sport
- Website: Official website
- 2026–27 Magyar Kupa

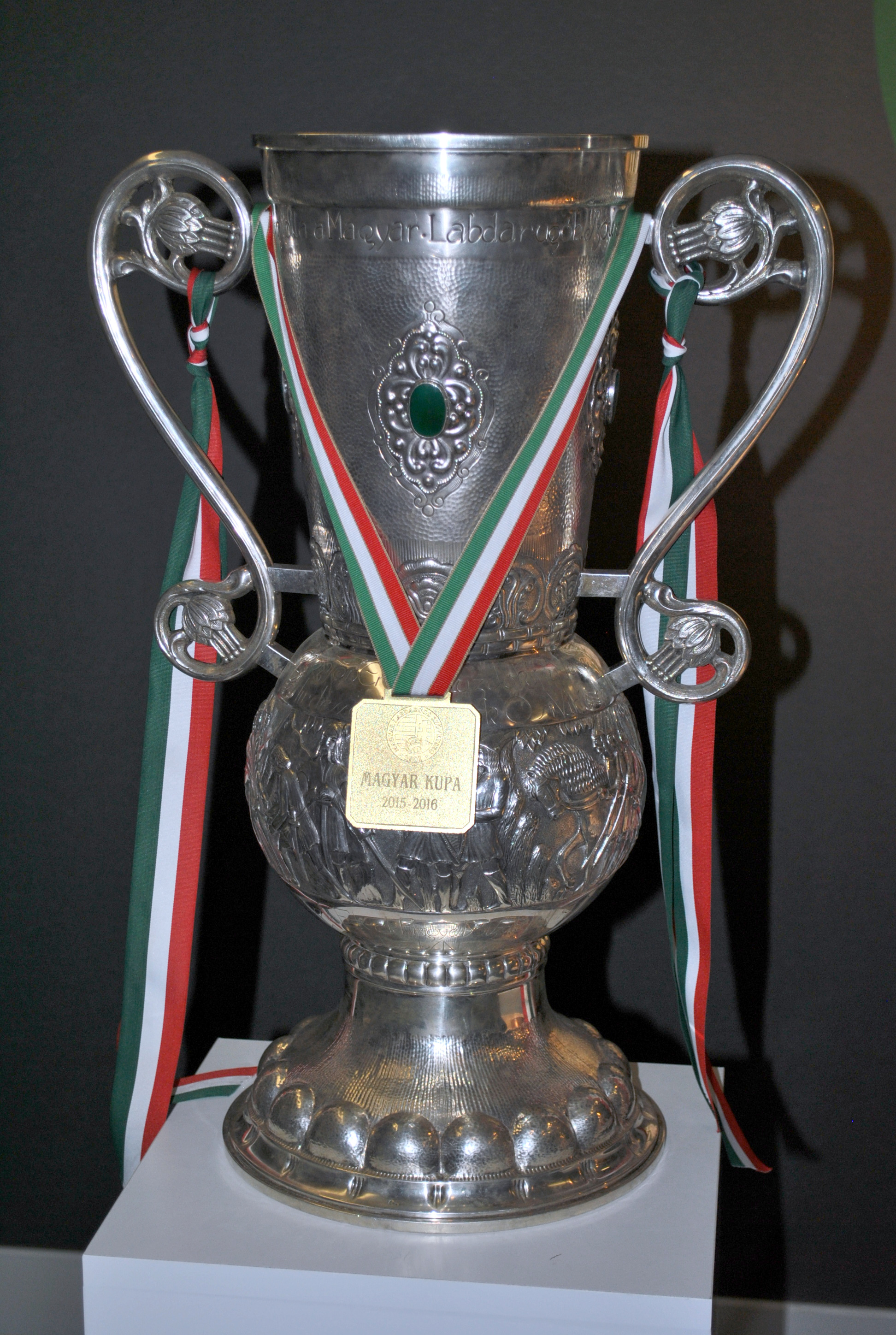
Magyar labdarúgókupa-2016

The Magyar Kupa (Hungarian: [ˈmɒɟɒr ˈkupɒ]), also known as the Hungarian Cup in English, officially known as MOL Magyar Kupa for sponsorship reasons, is a Hungarian knockout football cup competition held annually by the Hungarian Football Federation (MLSZ). It was started in 1909, eight years after the commencement of the Hungarian League.

Besides all of the professional clubs of Hungary numerous amateur sides take part every year. These have to qualify through local cup competitions.

The most successful participant and current titleholder in the Magyar Kupa has been Ferencváros with 25 wins, followed by local rivals MTK with 12 cups.

== History ==
Although the first Hungarian League match was played in 1901, the first Hungarian Cup match was played eight years later in 1910 between MTK Budapest FC and Budapesti TC. The first era of the Magyar Kupa was dominated by the same clubs as in the Hungarian League: MTK Budapest FC and Ferencvárosi TC. In the 1910s MTK won four trophies, while Ferencváros only one. However, in the 1920s Ferencváros won three other titles, whereas MTK two cups. The only club able to interrupt the Ferencvárosi TC–MTK Budapest FC rivalry was Kispesti AC in 1926.

In the 1930s, new clubs finally broke through to win the Hungarian Cup, and two of them were from outside Budapest. In 1930 Bocskai FC and in 1934 Soroksár FC. The traditional clubs (MTK and Ferencváros) won three trophies: Ferencváros in 1933 and 1935, and MTK in 1932.

The 1940s were dominated by Ferencváros by winning the cup in a three consecutive seasons: 1941–42, 1942–43, and 1943–44. Ferencváros's dominance was interrupted by Szolnoki MÁV FC by winning the 1940–41 season.

Due to the Hungarian Revolution of 1956, the Magyar Kupa was held only three times in the 1950s. Three Budapest clubs could win in the 1950s: Budapesti Bástya, Budapesti Vasas SC, and Ferencvárosi TC. The 1960s were dominated by Rába ETO Győr by winning the cup in three consecutive seasons: 1965, 1966, and 1967. In 1969 Újpesti Dózsa SC became cup winners for the first time after losing five finals.

The 1970s were dominated by Budapest clubs. Ferencváros won four times, Újpest won twice, and Vasas SC won once. However, the 1976–77 season was won by Diósgyőri VTK. This was the first time when the cup finals was in a round-robin tournament.

In the 1980s, Újpesti Dózsa SC won three trophies, while Budapest Honvéd SE could lift the cup twice. In the 1990s Ferencvárosi TC won the cup four times. In 1999 Debreceni VSC won their first cup trophy.

In the early 2000s, the Magyar Kupa was dominated by Debrecen by winning three trophies in 2001, 2008, 2010. Debrecen's dominance was interrupted by Újpest in 2002, and Ferencváros in 2003, and 2004 while Honvéd could win the cup in 2007 and in 2009 Other non-Budapest cup winners were Videoton in 2006 and Sopron in 2005.

In the 2010s, the dominance of the non-Budapest clubs continued. Debrecen managed to clinch the cup twice in the 2011–12 and in the 2012–13 seasons while Kecskemét could lift the trophy in the 2010–11 season. However, Újpest surprisingly won the 2013–14 season while the rebuilt Ferencváros in 2014–15 season.

== Format ==
The Magyar Kupa is contested as a traditional single-elimination knockout tournament.

- Early Rounds: Lower-league teams enter the competition first, playing through regional and national qualifying stages.
- Later Rounds: Top-flight clubs from the Nemzeti Bajnokság I (NB I) enter in the later stages.
- The Final: Historically played at various venues in Budapest, the final is traditionally hosted at the Puskás Aréna, the country's national stadium.

== Significance ==
The winner of the Magyar Kupa earns a prestigious piece of domestic silverware and secures a qualification spot in the preliminary rounds of the UEFA Europa League for the following season.

== Magyar Kupa Finals ==
Key
(R)	Replay
*	Match went to extra time
†	Match decided by a penalty shootout after extra time
‡	Winning team won the Double
Italics	Team from outside the Nemzeti Bajnokság I

#	Season	Winner	Score	Runner-up	Venue	Attendance	Notes
1.	1909–10	MTK Budapest	1–1 *	BTC	Millenáris Sporttelep, Budapest	3,000	
1.	1909–10	MTK Budapest	3–1 (R)	BTC	Millenáris Sporttelep, Budapest	4,000	
2.	1910–11	MTK Budapest	1–0	MAC	Üllői út, Budapest	15,000	
3.	1911–12	MTK Budapest	w/o	Ferencváros	None	0	
4.	1912–13	Ferencváros	2–1	BAK	Üllői út, Budapest	6,000	
5.	1913–14	MTK Budapest	4–0	MAC	Üllői út, Budapest	8,000	
No Competitions Held
6.	1921–22	Ferencváros	2–2 *	Újpest	Hungária körút, Budapest	8,000	
6.	1921–22	Ferencváros	1–0 (R)	Újpest	Hungária körút, Budapest	8,000	
7.	1922–23	MTK Budapest	4–1	Újpest	Üllői út, Budapest	5,000	
No Competitions Held
8.	1924–25	MTK Budapest	4–0	Újpest	Hungária körút, Budapest	12,000	
9.	1925–26	Kispest	1–1 *	BEAC	Hungária körút, Budapest	300	
9.	1925–26	Kispest	3–2 (R)	BEAC	Postás Sport Egyesület, Budapest	150	
10.	1926–27	Ferencváros	3–0	Újpest	Hungária körút, Budapest	9,000	
11.	1927–28	Ferencváros	5–1	Attila FC	Üllői út, Budapest	8,000	
No Competitions Held
12.	1929–30	Bocskai	5–1	Szegedi Bástya	Hungária körút, Budapest	1,200	
13.	1930–31	III. Kerület	4–1	Ferencváros	Üllői út, Budapest	3,000	
14.	1931–32	Hungária	1–1 *	Ferencváros	Üllői út, Budapest	9,000	
14.	1931–32	Hungária	4–3 (R)	Ferencváros	Hungária körút, Budapest	8,000	
15.	1932–33	Ferencváros	11–1	Újpest	Hungária körút, Budapest	10,000	
16.	1933–34	Soroksár	2–2 *	BSZKRT	Üllői út, Budapest	1,000	
16.	1933–34	Soroksár	1–1 * (R)	BSZKRT	Üllői út, Budapest	15,000	
16.	1933–34	Soroksár	2–0 (R)	BSZKRT	Millenáris Sporttelep, Budapest	1,600	
17.	1934–35	Ferencváros	2–1	MTK Budapest	Hungária körút, Budapest	8,000	
No Competitions Held							
18.	1940–41	Szolnok	3–0	Salgótarján	Üllői út, Budapest	7,000	
19.	1941–42	Ferencváros	6–2	Diósgyőr	Hungária körút, Budapest	18,000	
20.	1942–43	Ferencváros	3–0	Salgótarján	Hungária körút, Budapest	20,000	
21.	1943–44	Ferencváros	2–2 *	Kolozsvár	Hungária körút, Budapest	28,000	
21.	1943–44	Ferencváros	3–1 (R)	Kolozsvár	Hungária körút, Budapest	10,000	
No Competitions Held
22.	1951–52	Budapesti Bástya	3–2	Dorog	Építők stadion, Budapest	14,000	
Suspended							
No Competitions Held							
23.	1954–55	Vasas Budapest	3–2	Budapest Honvéd	Népstadion, Budapest	40,000	
24.	1955–58	Ferencváros	2–1	Salgótarján	Népstadion, Budapest	10,000	
No Competitions Held							
25.	1964	Budapest Honvéd	1–0	Győr	Népstadion, Budapest	8,000	
26.	1965	Győr	4–0	Diósgyőr	Népstadion, Budapest	3,000	
27.	1966	Győr	1–1 *	Ferencváros	Népstadion, Budapest	10,000	
27.	1966	Győr	3–2 (R)	Ferencváros	Népstadion, Budapest	17,000	
28.	1967	Győr	1–0	Salgótarján	Népstadion, Budapest	3,000	
29.	1968	MTK Budapest	2–1	Budapest Honvéd	Népstadion, Budapest	8,000	
30.	1969	Újpest	3–1	Budapest Honvéd	Népstadion, Budapest	15,000	
31.	1970	Újpest	3–2	Komló	Népstadion, Budapest	5,000	
32.	1971–72	Ferencváros	2–1	Tatabánya	Megyeri út, Budapest	4,000	
33.	1972–73	Vasas Budapest	4–3 *	Budapest Honvéd	Népstadion, Budapest	10,000	
34.	1973–74	Ferencváros	3–1	Komló	Népstadion, Budapest	10,000	
35.	1974–75	Újpest	3–2	Szombathely	Népstadion, Budapest	3,000	
36.	1975–76	Ferencváros	1–0	MTK Budapest	Népstadion, Budapest	15,000	
37.	1976–77	Diósgyőr	RR	Ferencváros	Home and Away matches	—	
38.	1977–78	Ferencváros	4–2 *	Pécs	Népstadion, Budapest	20,000	
39.	1978–79	Győr	1–0	Ferencváros	Népstadion, Budapest	10,000	
40.	1979–80	Diósgyőr	3–1	Vasas Budapest	Veszprémi stadion, Veszprém	15,000	
41.	1980–81	Vasas Budapest	1–0	Diósgyőr	Szegedi stadion, Szeged	10,000	
42.	1981–82	Újpest	2–0	Videoton	Szekszárdi stadion, Szekszárd	18,000	
43.	1982–83	Újpest	3–2	Budapest Honvéd	Népstadion, Budapest	5,000	
44.	1983–84	Siófok	2–1	Győr	Sóstói Stadion, Székesfehérvár	17,000	
45.	1984–85	Budapest Honvéd	5–0	Tatabánya	Népstadion, Budapest	3,000	
46.	1985–86	Vasas Budapest	0–0 †	Ferencváros	Népstadion, Budapest	20,000	
47.	1986–87	Újpest	3–2	Pécs	Népstadion, Budapest	3,000	
48.	1987–88	Békéscsaba	3–2	Budapest Honvéd	Tiszaligeti Stadion, Szolnok	7,000	
49.	1988–89	Budapest Honvéd	1–0	Ferencváros	Népstadion, Budapest	20,000	
50.	1989–90	Pécs	2–0	Budapest Honvéd	Bányász Stadion, Tatabánya	3,000	
51.	1990–91	Ferencváros	1–0	Vác	Diósgyőri Stadion, Miskolc	8,000	
52.	1991–92	Újpest	1–0 *	Vác	Kórház utca, Békéscsaba	10,000	
53.	1992–93	Ferencváros	1–1	Szombathely	Rohonci úti Stadion, Szombathely	18,000	
53.	1992–93	Ferencváros	1–1 †	Szombathely	Üllői út, Budapest	18,000	
54.	1993–94	Ferencváros	3–0	Budapest Honvéd	Üllői út, Budapest	15,000	
54.	1993–94	Ferencváros	2–1	Budapest Honvéd	Bozsik József Stadion, Budapest	12,000	
55.	1994–95	Ferencváros	2–0	Vác	Üllői út, Budapest	8,000	
55.	1994–95	Ferencváros	4–3	Vác	Stadion Városi, Vác	10,000	
56.	1995–96	Budapest Honvéd	0–1	BVSC	Szőnyi út, Budapest	3,000	
56.	1995–96	Budapest Honvéd	2–0	BVSC	Bozsik József Stadion, Budapest	6,000	
57.	1996–97	MTK Budapest	6–0	BVSC	Hungária körút, Budapest	2,000	
57.	1996–97	MTK Budapest	2–0	BVSC	Szőnyi út, Budapest	1,000	
58.	1997–98	MTK Budapest	1–0	Újpest	Fáy utca, Budapest	13,000	
59.	1998–99	Debrecen	2–1	Tatabánya	Stadion Városi, Vác	12,000	
60.	1999–2000	MTK Budapest	3–1	Vasas Budapest	Népstadion, Budapest	4,000	
61.	2000–01	Debrecen	5–2	Videoton	Üllői út, Budapest	11,000	
62.	2001–02	Újpest	2–1 *	Szombathely	Stadion ETO, Győr	8,000	
63.	2002–03	Ferencváros	2–1	Debrecen	Puskás Ferenc Stadion, Budapest	10,000	
64.	2003–04	Ferencváros	3–1	Budapest Honvéd	Puskás Ferenc Stadion, Budapest	4,000	
65.	2004–05	Sopron	5–1	Ferencváros	Sóstói Stadion, Székesfehérvár	4,000	
66.	2005–06	Videoton	2–2 †	Vasas Budapest	Üllői út, Budapest	5,000	
67.	2006–07	Budapest Honvéd	2–2 †	Debrecen	Szusza Ferenc Stadion, Budapest	6,880	
68.	2007–08	Debrecen	7–0	Budapest Honvéd	Bozsik József Stadion, Budapest	2,000	
68.	2007–08	Debrecen	2–1	Budapest Honvéd	Oláh Gábor utcai Stadion, Debrecen	7,500	
69.	2008–09	Budapest Honvéd	1–0	Győr	ETO Park, Győr	14,000	
69.	2008–09	Budapest Honvéd	0–0	Győr	Bozsik József Stadion, Budapest	8,000	
70.	2009–10	Debrecen	3–2	Zalaegerszeg	Puskás Ferenc Stadion, Budapest	5,000	
71.	2010–11	Kecskemét	3–2	Videoton	Puskás Ferenc Stadion, Budapest	5,000	
72.	2011–12	Debrecen	3–3 †	MTK Budapest	Puskás Ferenc Stadion, Budapest	4,000	
73.	2012–13	Debrecen	2–1	Győr	Bozsik József Stadion, Budapest	5,000	
74.	2013–14	Újpest	1–1 †	Diósgyőr	Puskás Ferenc Stadion, Budapest	22,000	
75.	2014–15	Ferencváros	4–0	Videoton	Groupama Arena, Budapest	15,000	
76.	2015–16	Ferencváros	1–0	Újpest	Groupama Arena, Budapest	19,000	
77.	2016–17	Ferencváros	1–1 †	Vasas Budapest	Groupama Arena, Budapest	14,970	
78.	2017–18	Újpest	2–2 †	Puskás Akadémia	Groupama Arena, Budapest	11,270	
79.	2018–19	Vidi	2–1	Budapest Honvéd	Groupama Arena, Budapest	12,777	
80.	2019–20	Budapest Honvéd	2–1	Mezőkövesd	Puskás Aréna, Budapest	10,000	
81.	2020–21	Újpest	1–0 *	Fehérvár	Puskás Aréna, Budapest	4,500	
82.	2021–22	Ferencváros	3–0	Paks	Puskás Aréna, Budapest	38,979	
83.	2022–23	Zalaegerszeg	2–0 *	Budafok	Puskás Aréna, Budapest	24,152	
84.	2023–24	Paks	2–0 *	Ferencváros	Puskás Aréna, Budapest	51,900	
85.	2024–25	Paks	1–1 (4–3 p)	Ferencváros	Puskás Aréna, Budapest	54,762	
86.	2025–26	Ferencváros	1–0 *	Zalaegerszeg	Puskás Aréna, Budapest	49,858	

Notes:

- Note 1: In 1912, Ferencvárosi TC did not play and lost by Walkover.
- Note 2: Final from 1956 held in 1958.
- Note 3: Final from 1977 played in Group-Format.

== Statistics ==
=== Performances by club ===
Club	Winners	Runners-up	Winning Years
Ferencváros ^{4}	25	10	1912–13, 1921–22, 1926–27, 1927–28, 1932–33, 1934–35, 1941–42, 1942–43, 1943–44, 1955–58, 1971–72, 1973–74, 1975–76, 1977–78, 1990–91, 1992–93, 1993–94, 1994–95, 2002–03, 2003–04, 2014–15, 2015–16, 2016–17, 2021–22, 2025–26
MTK Budapest ^{5}	12	3	1909–10, 1910–11, 1911–12, 1913–14, 1922–23, 1924–25, 1931–32, 1951–52, 1968, 1996–97, 1997–98, 1999–00
Újpest ^{6}	11	7	1969, 1970, 1974–75, 1981–82, 1982–83, 1986–87, 1991–92, 2001–02, 2013–14, 2017–18, 2020–21
Kispest-Honvéd ^{7}	8	11	1925–26, 1964, 1984–85, 1988–89, 1995–96, 2006–07, 2008–09, 2019–20
Debrecen	6	2	1998–99, 2000–01, 2007–08, 2009–10, 2011–12, 2012–13
Győr ^{8}	4	4	1965, 1966, 1967, 1978–79
Vasas ^{9}	4	4	1954–55, 1972–73, 1980–81, 1985–86
Fehérvár ^{11}	2	5	2005–06, 2018–19
Diósgyőr ^{10}	2	4	1976–77, 1979–80
Paks	2	1	2023–24, 2024–25
Pécs ^{12}	1	2	1989–90
Zalaegerszeg	1	2	2022–23
Kecskemét	1	–	2010–11
Sopron	1	–	2004–05
Békéscsaba	1	–	1987–88
Siófok	1	–	1983–84
Szolnok ^{13}	1	–	1940–41
Soroksár	1	–	1933–34
III. Kerület	1	–	1930–31
Bocskai	1	–	1929–30
Salgótarján	–	4	–
Szombathely	–	3	–
Tatabánya	–	3	–
Vác	–	3	–
BVSC	–	2	–
Komló	–	2	–
MAC	–	2	–
Miskolc	–	1	–
BAK	–	1	–
Szeged	–	1	–
BEAC	–	1	–
BSZKRT	–	1	–
BTC	–	1	–
Dorog	–	1	–
Mezőkövesd	–	1	–
Puskás Akadémia	–	1	–
Kolozsvár ^{14}	–	1	–
Budafok	–	1	–

Notes:

- Note 4: Includes Ferencváros FC
- Note 5: Includes MTK, MTK-VM, Hungária and Bástya.
- Note 6: Includes Újpesti Dózsa and Újpesti TE.
- Note 7: Includes Kispesti AC and Kispest-Honvéd.
- Note 8: Includes Vasas ETO Gyõr and Rába Vasas ETO Gyõr.
- Note 9: Includes Vasas SC, Budapesti Vasas SC
- Note 10: Includes Diósgyőri MÁVAG SC
- Note 11: Includes FC Fehérvár and Videoton FC.
- Note 12: Includes Pécsi MFC.
- Note 13: Includes Szolnoki MÁV SE
- Note 14: A team from Cluj-Napoca, Romania.

=== Performances by county ===
As of 9 May 2026

County	Titles	Winning clubs
Budapest	62	Ferencváros (25); MTK (12); Újpest (11); Honvéd (8); Vasas (4); Soroksár (1); III. Kerület (1)
Hajdú-Bihar	7	Debrecen (6); Bocskai (1)
Győr-Moson-Sopron	5	Győr (4); Sopron (1)
Borsod-Abaúj-Zemplén	2	Diósgyőr (2)
Fejér	2	Fehérvár (2)
Tolna	2	Paks (2)
Bács-Kiskun	1	Kecskemét (1)
Baranya	1	Pécs (1)
Békés	1	Békéscsaba (1)
Jász-Nagykun-Szolnok	1	Szolnok (1)
Somogy	1	Siófok (1)
Zala	1	Zalaegerszeg (1)

=== Top scorers in the Final ===
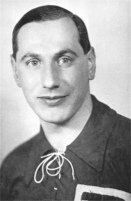
József Takács scored four times in the 1932–33 Final

The following football players scored at least three goals in the Magyar Kupa final. There have been only one player who scored four goals in one single match in the final of 1932–33, József Takács.

==== Four goals ====
- (Hungary) József Takács (Ferencváros FC) (1932–33)

==== Hat-trick ====
- (Hungary) Vilmos Kohut (Ferencváros FC) (1927–28)
- (Hungary) Pál Teleki (Bocskai FC) (1929–30)
- (Hungary) Pál Zilahi (III. Kerületi TVE) (1930–31)
- (Hungary) György Sárosi (Ferencvárosi TC) (1932–33)
- (Hungary) Béla Várady (Vasas SC) (1972–73)
- (Hungary) József Horváth (Újpesti Dózsa) (1974–75)
- (Hungary) János Görgei (Diósgyőri VTK) (1976–77)
- (Hungary) Péter Lipcsei (Ferencvárosi TC) (1994–95)
- (Cameroon) Dorge Kouemaha (Debreceni VSC) (2007–08)
- (Central African Republic) Foxi Kethevoama (Kecskeméti TE) (2010–11)

== Venues ==
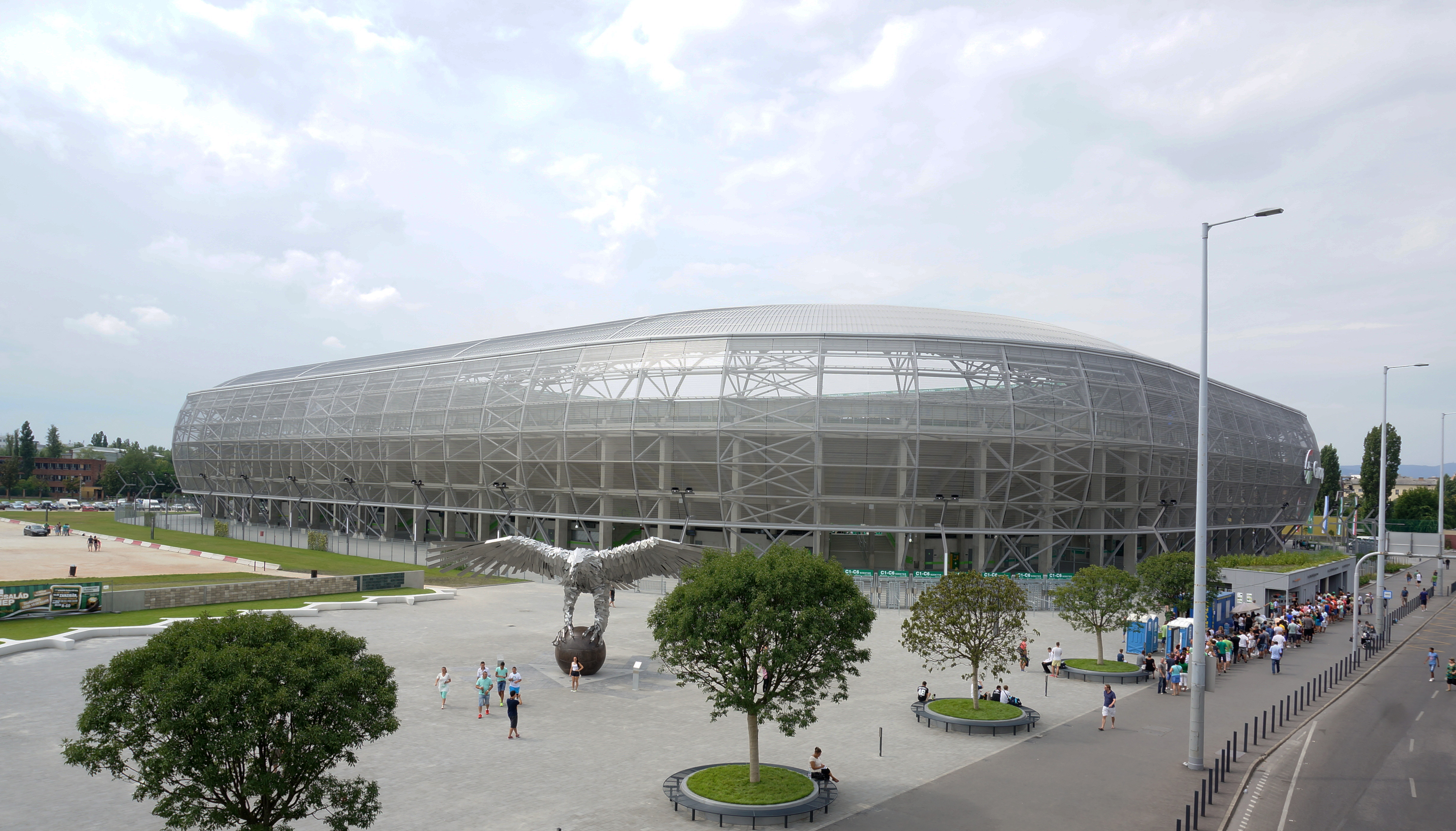
Groupama Aréna was the home of the 2017 Magyar Kupa Final

- In the list below are included all the stadiums, inclusive the stadiums from finals with 2 or 3 legs.

Matches played	City	Stadium	Last match played
28	Budapest	Népstadion/Puskás Ferenc Stadion	2013–14
18	Budapest	Üllői út/Groupama Aréna	2017–18
14	Budapest	Hungária körút/Hidegkuti Nándor Stadion	1996–97
7	Budapest	Puskás Aréna	2026
5	Budapest	Bozsik József Stadion	2012–13
3	Budapest	Millenáris Sporttelep	1933–34
2	Budapest	Megyeri út/Szusza Ferenc Stadion	2006–07
2	Székesfehérvár	Sóstói Stadion	2004–05
2	Vác	Stadion Városi	1998–99
2	Budapest	Szőnyi úti Stadion	1996–97
1	Győr	Stadion ETO/ETO Park	2008–09
1	Debrecen	Oláh Gábor utcai Stadion	2007–08
1	Budapest	Illovszky Rudolf Stadion	1997–98
1	Szombathely	Rohonci úti Stadion	1992–93
1	Békéscsaba	Kórház utca	1991–92
1	Miskolc	Diósgyőri Stadion	1990–91
1	Tatabánya	Stadium Bányász	1989–90
1	Szolnok	Tiszaligeti Stadion	1987–88
1	Szekszárd	Szekszárdi stadion	1981–82
1	Szeged	Szegedi stadion	1980–81
1	Veszprém	Veszprémi stadion	1979–80
1	Budapest	Építők stadion	1951–52
1	Budapest	Postás pálya	1925–26

== Referees in the Final ==
As of 23 May 2026.

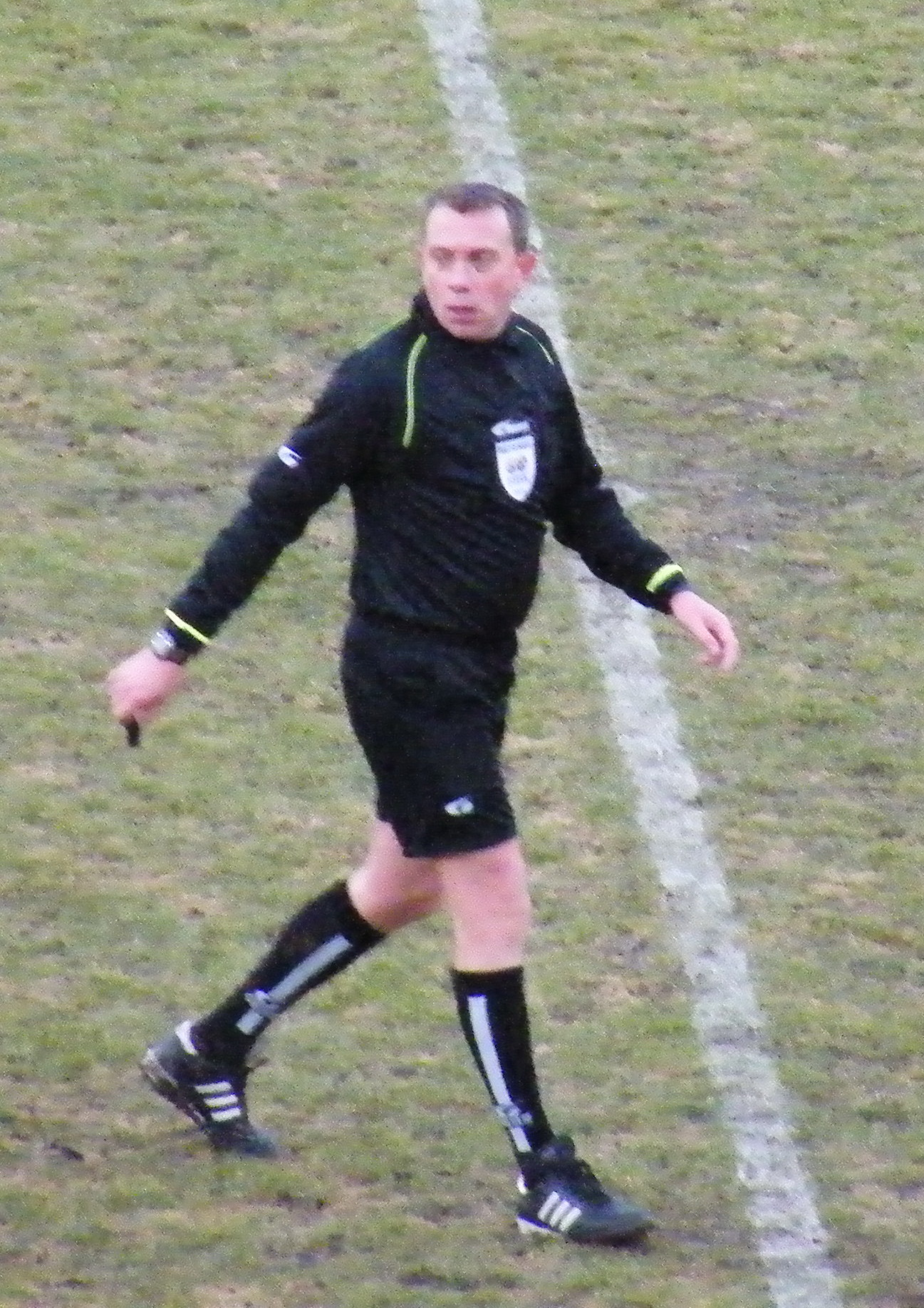
Zsolt Szabó

Referee	Year	No
(Hungary) Zoltán Iványi	2011, 2015, 2016, 2019	4
(Hungary) Péter Solymosi	2008–09, 2014, 2017	3
(Hungary) István Vad	2007–08, 2009–10, 2023	3
(Hungary) Attila Ábrahám	2000–01, 2001–02	2
(Hungary) János Megyebíró	2005–06, 2002–03	2
(Hungary) Viktor Kassai	2007–08, 2013	2
(Hungary) Zsolt Szabó	2008–09, 2011–12	2
(Hungary) Tamás Bognár	2020, 2022	2
(Hungary) Attila Hanacsek	2004–05	1
(Croatia) Edo Trivković	2004–05	1
(Hungary) Ferenc Bede	2006–07	1
(Hungary) Sándor Andó-Szabó	2018	1
(Hungary) Gergő Bogár	2021	1
(Hungary) Balázs Berke	2024	1
(Hungary) Csaba Pintér	2025	1
(Hungary) Márton Rúsz	2026	1

== See also ==
- Nemzeti Bajnokság I
