= József Takács =

Hungarian footballer (1904–1983)

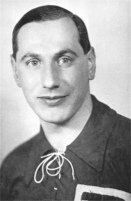

Personal information
- Date of birth: 30 June 1904
- Place of birth: Budapest, Austria-Hungary
- Date of death: 3 September 1983 (aged 79)
- Place of death: Budapest, Hungary
- Height: 1.77 m (5 ft 10 in)
- Position: Striker

Youth career
- 1917–1921: Vasas

Senior career*
| Years | Team | Apps | (Gls) |
| 1921–1927 | Vasas | 118 | (90) |
| 1927–1934 | Ferencváros | 139 | (215) |
| 1934–1935 | Szürketaxi | | |
| 1935–1936 | Soroksár | 25 | (23) |
| 1936–1940 | Szürketaxi | 73+ | (66+) |
| 1940–1942 | Vasas | | |

International career
| 1923–1933 | Hungary | 32 | (26) |
- * Club domestic league appearances and goals

József Takács (30 June 1904 – 3 September 1983) was a Hungarian international footballer who played as a striker for Vasas, Ferencváros, and the Hungarian national team between 1917 and 1934. He was also selected in Hungary's squad for the football tournament of the 1924 Summer Olympics, but he did not play in any matches.

== Club career ==
Born in Budapest on 30 June 1904, Takács began his footballing career as a goalkeeper, only making his debut as a striker due to an injury to a teammate. He joined the ranks of Vasas in 1917, aged 13, making his debut with the first team on 10 April 1921, in a league fixture against MTK, scoring in a 1–2 loss. In total, he scored 90 goals in 118 league matches with Vasas until 1927, when he joined Ferencvárosi, which signed him because he had been the league top scorer in the 1925–26 season with 29 goals.

In his first two seasons with Ferencváros, Takács was once again the league's top scorer with 31 and 42 goals, respectively, helping his side win the national league in 1927–28 and 1931–32, claiming the latter title with 22 wins out of 22. On 25 May 1933, he scored 4 goals in the final of the 1932–33 Magyar Kupa to help his side to a 11–1 victory over Újpest. During his seven-year stint at Ferencváros, he scored five goals or more in a single match on eleven occasions, which is a club record (five goals on eight occasions, six twice, and seven once), and netted 30 goals in only 18 Magyar Kupa matches, another club record. During his spell in Ferencvaros he netted a total of 254 goals among which 209 championship goals.

After leaving Ferencváros in 1934, he played one season at Soroksár (1935–36) – in between two spells at Szürketaxi, with whom he played for five seasons and scored 87 goals in 119 official games. Then, in 1940, he returned to Vasas, now in the second division. His tally, 360 top division goals, is the fourth highest in Hungarian championship.

After retiring in 1942, Takács became a trainer, taking over Zuglói SE during the 1945–46 season, and working with several lower division teams. The IFFHS ranked him 19th among the most successful top-flight goal scorers.

== International career ==
On 6 May 1923, the 18-year-old Takács made his international debut for Hungary in a friendly match against Austria in Vienna, which ended in a 1–0 loss. He was a member of the Hungarian squad that participated in the football tournament of the 1924 Summer Olympics in Paris, but did not play in any games. On 12 June 1927, Takács scored a six-goal haul to help his side to a resounding 13–1 victory over France.

In total, Takács scored 26 goals in 32 caps between 1923 and 1933.

== Playing style ==
Takács was one of the most successful Hungarian goalscorers in history, not because of his versatility, as he could only shoot with his right foot, but because of his off-ball movement and instinctive positioning, almost foreseeing the path of the ball, which meant that many of his goals were scored from close range, but his efforts from long-range shots were also dangerous. Furthermore, he always counted on possible mistakes from the defenders and the goalkeeper, constantly finding himself ready to pounce on them. He was also noted for being resourceful, possessing a sharp eye, and for his dribbling.

Takács was one of the most popular Hungarian players of his time, not only for his goals, but also for his modesty and exemplary human behavior.

== Career statistics ==
=== International goals ===
Hungary score listed first, score column indicates score after each Takács goal.

List of international goals scored by József Takács
| No. | Date | Venue | Opponent | Score | Result | Competition |
|---|---|---|---|---|---|---|
| 1 | 31 August 1924 | Üllői úti stadion, Budapest, Hungary | Poland | 2–0 | 4–0 | Friendly |
| 2 | 31 August 1924 | Üllői úti stadion, Budapest, Hungary | Poland | 3–0 | 4–0 | Friendly |
| 3 | 21 September 1924 | Ferencváros-Stadion, Budapest, Hungary | Germany | 3–0 | 4–1 | Friendly |
| 4 | 21 September 1924 | Ferencváros-Stadion, Budapest, Hungary | Germany | 4–1 | 4–1 | Friendly |
| 5 | 18 January 1925 | Campo di viale Lombardia, Milan, Italy | Italy | 2–1 | 2–1 | Friendly |
| 6 | 25 March 1925 | Hungária körúti stadion, Budapest, Hungary | Switzerland | 1–0 | 5–0 | Friendly |
| 7 | 5 May 1925 | Hohe Warte Stadium, Vienna, Austria | Austria | 1–0 | 1–3 | Friendly |
| 8 | 12 July 1925 | Olympic Stadium, Stockholm, Sweden | Sweden | 1–4 | 2–6 | Friendly |
| 9 | 12 July 1925 | Olympic Stadium, Stockholm, Sweden | Sweden | 2–4 | 2–6 | Friendly |
| 10 | 6 June 1926 | Üllői úti stadion, Budapest, Hungary | Czechoslovakia | 1–0 | 2–1 | Friendly |
| 11 | 12 June 1927 | Üllői úti stadion, Budapest, Hungary | France | 1–0 | 13–1 | Friendly |
| 12 | 12 June 1927 | Üllői úti stadion, Budapest, Hungary | France | 6–0 | 13–1 | Friendly |
| 13 | 12 June 1927 | Üllői úti stadion, Budapest, Hungary | France | 7–0 | 13–1 | Friendly |
| 14 | 12 June 1927 | Üllői úti stadion, Budapest, Hungary | France | 8–0 | 13–1 | Friendly |
| 15 | 12 June 1927 | Üllői úti stadion, Budapest, Hungary | France | 11–1 | 13–1 | Friendly |
| 16 | 12 June 1927 | Üllői úti stadion, Budapest, Hungary | France | 12–1 | 13–1 | Friendly |
| 17 | 25 September 1927 | Üllői úti stadion, Budapest, Hungary | Austria | 1–1 | 5–3 | 1927–30 Central European Cup |
| 18 | 25 March 1928 | Stadio Nazionale PNF, Rome, Italy | Italy | 3–3 | 3–4 | 1927–30 Central European Cup |
| 19 | 14 April 1929 | Wankdorf Stadium, Bern, Switzerland | Switzerland | 1–2 | 5–4 | 1927–30 Central European Cup |
| 20 | 14 April 1929 | Wankdorf Stadium, Bern, Switzerland | Switzerland | 5–3 | 5–4 | 1927–30 Central European Cup |
| 21 | 5 May 1929 | Hohe Warte Stadium, Vienna, Austria | Austria | 1–0 | 2–2 | Friendly |
| 22 | 5 May 1929 | Hohe Warte Stadium, Vienna, Austria | Austria | 2–2 | 2–2 | Friendly |
| 23 | 6 October 1929 | Hungária körúti stadion, Budapest, Hungary | Austria | 1–0 | 2–1 | Friendly |
| 24 | 28 September 1930 | Dresden, Germany | Germany | 1–0 | 3–5 | Friendly |
| 25 | 28 September 1930 | Dresden, Germany | Germany | 2–0 | 3–5 | Friendly |
| 26 | 28 September 1930 | Dresden, Germany | Germany | 3–0 | 3–5 | Friendly |

== Honours ==
Ferencvárosi

- Nemzeti Bajnokság I
  - Champions (3): 1927–28, 1931–32, and 1933–34
- Magyar Kupa
  - Champions: 1932–33

=== Individual ===
Vasas

- Top goalscorer of the Nemzeti Bajnokság I in 1925–26 (29 goals)

Ferencvárosi

- Top goalscorer of the Nemzeti Bajnokság I in 1927–28 (31 goals), 1928–29 (41 goals), 1929–30 (40 goals), and 1931–32 (42 goals)

== See also ==
- List of men's footballers with 500 or more goals
