= 1932–33 Magyar Kupa =

Tournament details
- Country: Hungary

Final positions
- Champions: Ferencváros FC
- Runners-up: Újpest FC

The 1932–33 Magyar Kupa (English: Hungarian Cup) was the 15th season of Hungary's annual knock-out cup football competition.

== Final ==
25 May 1933
17:30 (UTC+2)

Ferencváros FC	11–1	Újpest FC
Táncos 6', 50'; Sárosi 13', 21', 35'; Takács 15', 17', 72', 83'; Toldi 70'; Kohut 74'	Report	Szabó 78'

Hungária körúti stadion, Budapest
Attendance: 10,000
Referee: Árpád Klein (Hungary)

== See also ==
- 1932–33 Nemzeti Bajnokság I
