= 1926–27 Magyar Kupa =

Tournament details
- Country: Hungary

Final positions
- Champions: Ferencváros FC
- Runners-up: Újpest FC

The 1926–27 Magyar Kupa (English: Hungarian Cup) was the 10th season of Hungary's annual knock-out cup football competition.

== Final ==
16 June 1927
17:30 (UTC+2)

Ferencváros FC	3–0	Újpest FC
Turay 77', 81'; Bukovi 89'	Report

Hungária körúti stadion, Budapest
Attendance: 9,000
Referee: Frigyes Klug (Hungary)

== See also ==
- 1926–27 Nemzeti Bajnokság I
