= Ottó Szabó (footballer, born 1955) =

Hungarian footballer and coach

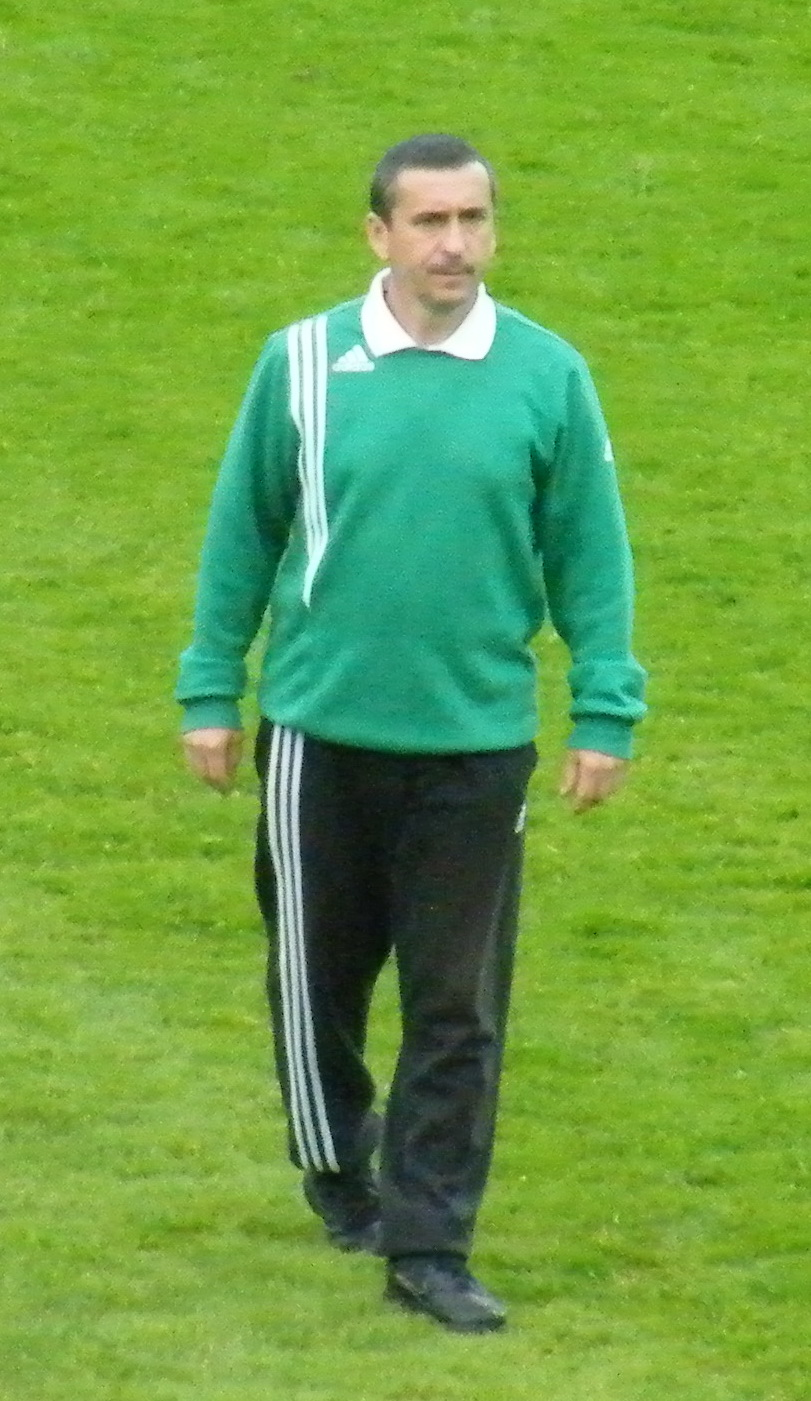
- Szabó in 2009

Personal information
- Date of birth: 16 December 1955 (age 70)
- Place of birth: Győr, Hungary
- Position: Forward

Youth career
- 1973–1974: Győri Dózsa

Senior career*
Years	Team	Apps	(Gls)
1974–1990	Győri ETO FC	350	(69)
1990–1993	SVg Wiener Neudorf		

International career
1984	Hungary	1	(0)

Managerial career
- 1990: Győri ETO FC
- 2003: Győri ETO FC
- * Club domestic league appearances and goals

Ottó Szabó (born 16 December 1955) is a Hungarian former professional footballer who played as a forward, later became a football coach. He was a member of the Hungary national team.

== Career ==
Szabó played for Győri Dózsa until 1974. Between 1974 and 1990 he scored 69 goals in 350 league matches for Győri ETO FC. He was a member of the team that won two championships, two silver and one bronze medal between 1982 and 1986. In the early 1990s he retired from active football with SVg Wiener Neudorf in Austria.

In 1984 he made one appearance for the Hungary national team.

== Honours ==
Győri ETO FC

- Nemzeti Bajnokság I: 1981–82, 1982–83; runner-up 1983–84, 1984–85
- Magyar Kupa: 1979; runner-up 1985
