= 1989–90 Magyar Kupa =

Tournament details
- Country: Hungary

Final positions
- Champions: Pécs
- Runners-up: Budapest Honvéd

The 1989–90 Magyar Kupa (English: Hungarian Cup) was the 50th season of Hungary's annual knock-out cup football competition.

== Quarterfinals ==
Games were played on April 18 and April 25, 1990.

Team 1	Agg.	Team 2	1st leg	2nd leg
Budapest Honvéd	3–2	Siófoki Bányász	2–1	1–1
Győri ETO	5–1	MTK-VM	1–0	4–1
Pécs	8–2	Dunaferr	5–1	3–1
Váci Izzó	6–1	Újpesti Dózsa	4–0	2–1

== Semi-finals ==
Games were played on May 9 and May 23, 1990.

Team 1	Agg.	Team 2	1st leg	2nd leg
Budapest Honvéd	3–0	Váci Izzó	2–0	1–0
Pécs	3–0	Győri ETO	2–0	1–0

== Final ==
6 June 1990
17:00 (UTC+2)

Pécs	2–0	Budapest Honvéd
Bérczy 71'; Lehota 89'	Report

Városi Stadion, Tatabánya
Attendance: 3,000
Referee: László Molnár (Hungary)

== See also ==
- 1989–90 Nemzeti Bajnokság I
