= 1921–22 Magyar Kupa =

Tournament details
- Country: Hungary

Final positions
- Champions: Ferencvárosi TC
- Runners-up: Újpest FC

The 1921–22 Magyar Kupa (English: Hungarian Cup) was the 6th season of Hungary's annual knock-out cup football competition.

== Final ==
18 June 1922
17:30 (UTC+2)

Ferencvárosi TC	2–2	Újpest FC
Pataki 14'; Schwarz 52'	Report	Schaller 1'; Kósa 73'

Hungária körúti stadion, Budapest
Attendance: 5,000
Referee: Mire Vértes (Hungary)

=== Replay ===
20 August 1922
17:30 (UTC+2)

Ferencvárosi TC	1–0	Újpest FC
Wágner 48'	Report

Hungária körúti stadion, Budapest
Attendance: 8,000
Referee: László Nagy (Hungary)

== See also ==
- 1921–22 Nemzeti Bajnokság I
