= 1942–43 Magyar Kupa =

Tournament details
- Country: Hungary

Final positions
- Champions: Ferencváros FC
- Runners-up: Salgótarjáni BTC

The 1942–43 Magyar Kupa (English: Hungarian Cup) was the 20th season of Hungary's annual knock-out cup football competition.

== Final ==
27 June 1943
17:30 (UTC+2)

Ferencváros FC	3–0	Salgótarjáni BTC
Sárosi 11', 50'; Ónodi 82'	Report

MOVE-pálya, Budapest
Attendance: 18,000
Referee: Ernő Kiss (Hungary)

== See also ==
- 1942–43 Nemzeti Bajnokság I
