= 1933–34 Magyar Kupa =

Tournament details
- Country: Hungary

Final positions
- Champions: Soroksár FC
- Runners-up: BSZKRT

The 1933–34 Magyar Kupa (English: Hungarian Cup) was the 16th season of Hungary's annual knock-out cup football competition.

== Final ==
31 May 1934
17:30 (UTC+2)

Soroksár FC	2–2	BSZKRT
Szeder; Vadász	Report	Szaller; Király

Üllői úti stadion, Budapest
Attendance: 1,000
Referee: György Gellért (Hungary)

=== First replay ===
30 June 1934
17:30 (UTC+2)

Soroksár FC	1–1	BSZKRT
Báder	Report	Páli

Üllői úti stadion, Budapest
Attendance: 15,000
Referee: Károly Égner (Hungary)

=== Second replay ===
26 August 1934
17:30 (UTC+2)

Soroksár FC	2–0	BSZKRT
Kelemen 69'; Vadász 73'	Report

Millenáris Sporttelep, Budapest
Attendance: 1,600
Referee: Kálmán Tihaméri (Hungary)

== See also ==
- 1933–34 Nemzeti Bajnokság I
