= 2010 Magyar Kupa final =

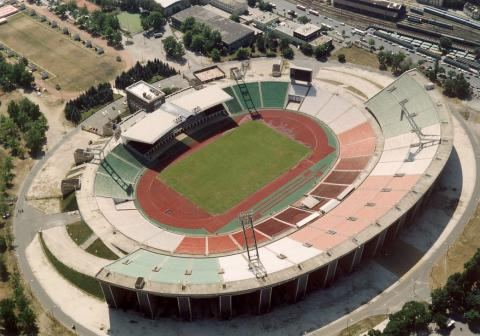
- Puskás Ferenc Stadion hosted the final
- Event: 2009–10 Magyar Kupa
Debrecen	Zalaegerszeg
3	2
- Date: 26 May 2010
- Venue: Puskás Ferenc Stadion, Budapest
- Referee: István Vad
- Attendance: 5,000

The Magyar Kupa final was the final match of the 2009–10 Magyar Kupa, played between Debrecen and Zalaegerszeg.

== Teams ==
Team	Previous finals appearances (bold indicates winners)
Debrecen	5 (**1999**, **2001**, 2003, 2007, **2008**)
Zalaegerszeg	None

== Route to the final ==
Debrecen			Round	Zalaegerszeg
Opponent	Result	Legs		Opponent	Result	Legs
			Round 3	Hévíz FC	3–0
Nyírmadai ISE	8–2		Round 4	Pécsi MFC	1–0
Mezőkövesdi SE	8–4	4–1 away; 4–3 home	Round 5	Haladás	3–1	2–0 away; 1–1 home;
MTK Budapest	2–2 (5–4 (p))	2–0 home; 0–2 away	Quarterfinals	Szigetszentmiklósi TK	6–1	3–0 away; 3–1 home
Budapest Honvéd	3–2	1–1 away; 2–1 home	Semifinals	Újpest	1–0	1–0 away; 0–0 home

== Match ==
26 May 2010
20:00 CEST

Debrecen	3–2	Zalaegerszeg
Coulibaly 24', 67'; Yannick 30'	Report	Pavićević 41'; Rudņevs 70'

Puskás Ferenc Stadion, Budapest
Attendance: 5,000
Referee: István Vad

**Debrecen**	**Zalaegerszeg**

GK	87	(Hungary) István Verpecz
DF	22	(Hungary) Csaba Bernáth (c)
DF	16	(Hungary) Ádám Komlósi (yellow card) 12'
DF	24	(North Macedonia) Mirsad Mijadinoski
DF	86	(Hungary) Zsolt Laczkó (yellow card) 32'
MF	55	(Hungary) Péter Szakály
MF	27	(Hungary) Ádám Bódi (substituted off) 90'
MF	25	(Hungary) Zoltán Szélesi
MF	77	(Hungary) Péter Czvitkovics (substituted off) 82'
FW	20	(Cameroon) Mbengono Yannick (substituted off) 44'
FW	39	(France) Adamo Coulibaly
Substitutes:
GK	1	(Montenegro) Vukašin Poleksić
DF	21	(Hungary) Marcell Fodor
MF	30	(Hungary) Zoltán Kiss (substituted on) 82'
MF	7	(Hungary) Tibor Dombi
MF	33	(Hungary) József Varga (substituted on) 90'
FW	23	(Hungary) Péter Szilágyi
FW	15	(Hungary) László Rezes (substituted on) 44' (yellow card) 71'
Manager:
(Hungary) András Herczeg

GK	1	(Hungary) Géza Vlaszák
DF	2	(Hungary) Gergely Kocsárdi (c) (substituted off) 77'
DF	22	(Slovenia) Matej Miljatovič
DF	3	(Serbia) Milan Bogunović
DF	16	(Hungary) Péter Máté (yellow card) 63'
MF	20	(Slovakia) Marián Sluka (substituted off) 61'
MF	21	(Hungary) András Horváth
MF	19	(Bosnia and Herzegovina) Đorđe Kamber
MF	7	(Hungary) Gyula Illés
FW	11	(Latvia) Artjoms Rudņevs
FW	6	(Montenegro) Darko Pavićević
Substitutes:
GK	23	(Hungary) Gábor Sipos
DF	8	(Slovenia) Leon Panikvar
DF	4	(Serbia) Nenad Todorović
MF	15	(Hungary) Márk Petneházi
MF	13	(Hungary) Zsolt Barna
FW	25	(Curaçao) Prince Rajcomar (substituted on) 77'
FW	17	(Hungary) Zsolt Balázs (substituted on) 61'
Manager:
(Hungary) János Csank
