= 1954–55 Magyar Kupa =

Tournament details
- Country: Hungary

Final positions
- Champions: Budapesti Vasas SC
- Runners-up: Budapesti Honvéd SE

The 1954–55 Magyar Kupa (English: Hungarian Cup) was the 23rd season of Hungary's annual knock-out cup football competition.

== Round 1 ==
In the event of a tie, the away team advanced.

- The Hunyai SK - Szegedi Haladás match was canceled because the number of the home team was not enough at the beginning.
- The Hungarian Cotton Weaver - Szolnok Kinizsi missed, the Nyírád Miner - Ercsi Kinizsi 4 - 2 results were canceled because Szolnok and Nyírád did not have valid sports doctor licenses.
- The results of the Pécs Locomotive - Dombóvár Locomotive 6 - 3 were canceled because Pécs included two unlicensed players.

Team 1	Score	Team 2
12. February 1955.
I. sz. Autójavító	0 – 1	Kecskeméti Honvéd
13. February 1955.
Bp. Honvéd	11 – 2	Nagybátonyi Bányász
Miskolci Lokomotív	3 – 1	Vörös Lobogó Dunacipőgyár
Salgótarjáni Vasas	2 – 3	Bp. Lokomotív
Diósgyőri Vasas	10 – 0	Gyöngyösi Bányász
Egri Petőfi	1 – 3	Salgótarjáni BTC
Debreceni Honvéd	0 – 0	Nyíregyházi Építők
Tiszalöki Építők	1 – 2	Somsályi Bányász
Vasas Izzó	4 – 2	Csepel Autó
Csepeli Vasas	23 – 0	Berettyóújfalusi VM
Hunyai SK		Szegedi Haladás
Mezőtúri Traktor	3 – 2	Gyulai Traktor
Hazai Pamutszövő		Szolnoki Kinizsi
Szegedi Dózsa	1 – 2	Légierő
Soltvadkert	1 – 2	Petőfi VTSK
Bp. Dózsa	10 – 1	Sortex
Bp. Kinizsi	11 – 0	Vasas Turbó
Vasas Kaliber	1 – 4	Gödöllői Dózsa
Polgárdi Honvéd	1 – 1	Józsefvárosi Szállítók
Mosoni Vasas	1 – 8	Szombathelyi Lokomotív
Veszprémi Haladás	2 – 7	Bp. Vasas
Pécsi Lokomotív		Dombóvári Lokomotív
Komlói Bányász	4 – 2	Somogyi Kinizsi
Tolnai Vörös Lobogó	3 – 6	Pécsi Dózsa
Nyírádi Bányász		Ercsi Kinizsi
Celdömölki Lokomotív	2 – 9	Győri Vasas
Szőnyi Szikra	0 – 12	Dorogi Bányász
Szentgotthárdi Vörös Lobogó	10 – 2	Hegyeshalmi Lokomotív
Tatabányai Bányász	19 – 0	Vasas Gamma
Vízművek	2 – 2	Bázakerettyei Bányász
Nagykanizsai Bányász	4 – 0	Kaposvári Dózsa
Csepeli Szikra	0 – 16	Bp. Vörös Lobogó

== Round 2. ==
Team 1	Score	Team 2
1955. február 20.
Miskolci Lokomotív	2 – 5	Bp. Honvéd
Bp. Lokomotív	0 – 5	Diósgyőri Vasas
Nyíregyházi Építők	3 – 2	Vasas Izzó
Somsályi Bányász	2 – 6	Salgótarjáni BTC
Szegedi Haladás	2 – 2	Csepeli Vasas
Mezőtúri Traktor	6 – 1	Hazai Pamutszövő
Légierő	3 – 0	Petőfi VTSK
Gödöllői Dózsa	2 – 8	Bp. Kinizsi
Szombathelyi Lokomotív	9 – 0	Szentgotthárdi Vörös Lobogó
Bp. Vasas	20 – 0	Dombóvári Lokomotív
Pécsi Dózsa	5 – 0	Komlói Bányász
Győri Vasas	9 – 0	Ercsi Kinizsi
Dorogi Bányász	3 – 1	Józsefvárosi Szállítók
Tatabányai Bányász	3 – 0	Bázakerettyei Bányász
Bp. Vörös Lobogó	4 – 0	Nagykanizsai Bányász
Kecskeméti Honvéd	0 – 5	Bp. Dózsa

== Round 3. ==
Team 1	Score	Team 2
10. April 1955.
Salgótarjáni Bányász	4 – 1	Nyíregyházi Építők
Dorogi Bányász	3 – 1	Győri Vasas
Tatabányai Bányász	1 – 4	Bp. Vörös Lobogó
Bp. Vasas	2 – 0	Pécsi Dózsa
Bp. Dózsa	1 – 2	Légierő
8. May 1955.
Mezőtúri Traktor	1 – 3	Csepeli Vasas
26. May 1955.
Bp. Kinizsi	2 – 4	Szombathelyi Törekvés
22. Jun 1955.
Bp. Honvéd	3 – 1	Diósgyőri Vasas

== Quarterfinals ==
Team 1	Score	Team 2
22. Jun 1955.
Csepeli Vasas	2 – 2	Légierő
Bp. Vörös Lobogó	5 – 0	Dorogi Bányász
30. July 1955.
Bp. Vasas	7 – 1	Szombathelyi Törekvés
13. August 1955.
Bp. Honvéd	9 – 2	Salgótarjáni Bányász

== Semifinals ==
Team 1	Score	Team 2
13. August 1955
Bp. Vörös Lobogó	2 – 5	Bp. Vasas
17. August 1955
Légierő	2 – 3	Bp. Honvéd

== Final ==
20 August 1955
17:00 (UTC+2)

Budapesti Vasas SC	3–2	Budapesti Honvéd SE
Teleki 8'; Raduly 29'; Bundzsák 74'	Report	Kocsis 23'; Budai 77'

Népstadion, Budapest
Attendance: 40,000
Referee: Árpád Kamarás-Klein (Hungary)

== See also ==
- 1954 Nemzeti Bajnokság I
