= 1941–42 Magyar Kupa =

Tournament details
- Country: Hungary

Final positions
- Champions: Ferencváros FC
- Runners-up: Diósgyőri MÁVAG SC

The 1941–42 Magyar Kupa (English: Hungarian Cup) was the 19th season of Hungary's annual knock-out cup football competition.

== Final ==
29 June 1942
17:30 (UTC+2)

Ferencváros FC	6–2	Diósgyőri MÁVAG SC
Kiszely 5'; Jakab 8', 81'; Lukács 65'; Kiss 75'; Füstös 84'	Report	Turbéki 51'; Fazekas 60'

MOVE-pálya, Budapest
Attendance: 18,000
Referee: Károly Égner (Hungary)

== See also ==
- 1941–42 Nemzeti Bajnokság I
