= 1990–91 Magyar Kupa =

Tournament details
- Country: Hungary

Final positions
- Champions: Ferencváros
- Runners-up: Váci Izzó

The 1989–90 Magyar Kupa (English: Hungarian Cup) was the 51st season of Hungary's annual knock-out cup football competition.

== Quarter-finals ==
Team 1	Agg.	Team 2	1st leg	2nd leg
Váci Izzó	3–3 (a)	Dorogi Bányász	1–1	2–2
Paks	1–0	Diósgyőr	0–0	1–0
Volán	1–5	Ferencváros	0–3	1–2
Tatabányai Bányász	2–4	Kazincbarcika	1–2	1–2

== Semi-finals ==
Team 1	Agg.	Team 2	1st leg	2nd leg
Ferencváros	5–3	Paks	4–1	1–2
Kazincbarcika	0–1	Váci Izzó	0–1	0–0

== Final ==
18 June 1991
17:00 (UTC+2)

Ferencváros	1–0	Váci Izzó
Bouiche 27'	Report

Diósgyőri Stadion, Miskolc
Attendance: 8,000
Referee: László Vágner (Hungary)

== See also ==
- 1990–91 Nemzeti Bajnokság I
