= 1934–35 Magyar Kupa =

Tournament details
- Country: Hungary

Final positions
- Champions: Ferencváros FC
- Runners-up: Hungária FC

The 1934–35 Magyar Kupa (English: Hungarian Cup) was the 17th season of Hungary's annual knock-out cup football competition.

== Final ==
10 June 1935
17:30 (UTC+2)

Ferencváros FC	2–1	Hungária FC
Toldi 26'; Sárosi 26' (pen.)	Report	Cseh 54'

Hungária körúti stadion, Budapest
Attendance: 8,000
Referee: Mihály Iváncsics (Hungary)

== See also ==
- 1934–35 Nemzeti Bajnokság I
