= 1987–88 Magyar Kupa =

Tournament details
- Country: Hungary

Final positions
- Champions: Békéscsaba
- Runners-up: Budapest Honvéd

The 1987–88 Magyar Kupa (English: Hungarian Cup) was the 48th season of Hungary's annual knock-out cup football competition.

== Quarter-finals ==
Games were played on March 9 and March 23, 1988.

Team 1	Agg.	Team 2	1st leg	2nd leg
Békéscsaba	3–2	Volán	2–0	1–2 (a.e.t.)
Videoton	2–4	Győri ETO	1–1	1–3
Szolnoki MÁV	2–1	Szombathelyi Haladás	1–1	1–0
Budapest Honvéd	1–1 (a)	Vasas	0–0	1–1

== Semi-finals ==
Games were played on April 13, May 24, 25 and June 10, 1988.

Team 1	Agg.	Team 2	1st leg	2nd leg
Szolnoki MÁV	2–4	Békéscsaba	1–2	1–2
Budapest Honvéd	3–1	Győri ETO	2–1	1–0

== Final ==
13 June 1988
17:30 (UTC+2)

Békéscsaba	3–2	Budapest Honvéd
Csernus 60'; Gruborovics 69'; Csató 80'	Report	Gulyás 8' (o.g.); Gyimesi 74' (pen.)

Tiszaligeti Stadion, Szolnok
Attendance: 8,000
Referee: Gábor Plasek (Hungary)

== See also ==
- 1987–88 Nemzeti Bajnokság I
