= Mezőkövesdi SE =

Association football club in Hungary

- Full name: Mezőkövesdi Sport Egyesület
- Founded: 31 January 1975; 51 years ago
- Ground: Mezőkövesdi Városi Stadion; Mezőkövesd, Hungary
- Capacity: 5,000
- Chairman: András Tállai
- Manager: Aurél Csertői
- League: NB II
- 2025–26: NB II, 5th of 16
- Website: mezokovesdzsory.hu
Home colours	Away colours

Mezőkövesdi Sport Egyesület (Hungarian: [ˈmɛzøːkøvɛʒd]) is a professional football club located in Mezőkövesd, Hungary. The team's colors are yellow and blue. The team name comes from the Zsóry family who founded the thermal baths that brought wealth to the town.

== History ==
The club was founded in 1975.

On 5 June 2016, Mezőkövesdi SE hosted Dunaújváros PASE on the 30th match day in the 2015–16 Nemzeti Bajnokság II season at the newly built Mezőkövesdi Városi Stadion. The match was won by the home team which also resulted the club's promotion to the 2016–17 Nemzeti Bajnokság I.

On 16 July 2016, Mezőkövesd played their first match in the 2016–17 Nemzeti Bajnokság I season at the Mezőkövesdi Városi Stadion against Gyirmót FC Győr. The match ended with a 2–2 draw.

In the 2016–17 Magyar Kupa season, Mezőkövesd were eliminated in the semi-finals by Vasas SC on 7–0 aggregate. By reaching the semi-finals Mezőkövesd set a record in the Magyar Kupa. In the first leg, Mezőkövesd lost 2–0 at the Szusza Ferenc Stadion, while in the second leg, Mezőkövesd lost 5–0 at the Városi Stadion on 17 May 2017.

In the 2016–17 Nemzeti Bajnokság I season, Mezőkövesd were escaping from relegation along with Debreceni VSC, Diósgyőri VTK, and MTK Budapest. On the 32nd matchday, Mezőkövesd hosted Paksi FC and won the match with a late goal by Gohér at the Városi Stadion on 20 May 2017.

The club was featured in the Worldsoccer.com.

In the 2019-20 Magyar Kupa, the club reached the final by defeating Hévíz in the round of 128, Sényő in the round of 64, Győr in the round of 32, Kaposvár in the round of 16, Puskás Akadémia in the quarter-finals, Fehérvár in the semi-finals. In the 2020 Magyar Kupa Final, Mezőkövesd was beaten by Budapest Honvéd FC 2–1 at the Puskás Aréna.

On 14 September 2022, Attila Kuttor was appointed as the head coach of the club. On 13 February 2024, Kuttor was sacked due to weak performance.

In the 2023–24 Magyar Kupa season Mezőkövesd entered the round of 64 and they lost to FC Ajka 1–0 on 16 September 2023. The only goal was cored by Filip Borsos in the 18th minute.

In the 2023–24 Nemzeti Bajnokság I season, Mezőkövesd finished 12th and were relegated to the second division. During the season, Mezőkövesd could beat Debrecen twice, and beat Kecskemét away. At home they beat Újpest and MTK Budapest. Mezőkövesd drew six times in the season and the most surprising draw was at Groupama Aréna against Ferencváros on 3 December 2023. On 14 February 2024, Milan Milanović was appointed as the coach. The day after in an interview Milanovic said that he wants to form a winning team. On 10 March 2024, Milanovic said that the club will fight until they have mathematical chances to remain in the top flight. Mezőkövesd lost 22 matches in the season and on 6 April 2024, they suffered their biggest defeat in the season against Fehérvár at the Sóstói Stadion. On 17 April 2024, Milanovic resigned; however, the management did not accept his resignation and convinced him to stay until the end of the season. On the last match day, they drew with MTK Budapest at home.

In the 2024–25 Magyar Kupa season Mezőkövesd defeated 1-0 Nemzeti Bajnokság I club Debreceni VSC on 29 October 2024. Mezőkövesd qualified for the 16th finals.

== Stadium ==
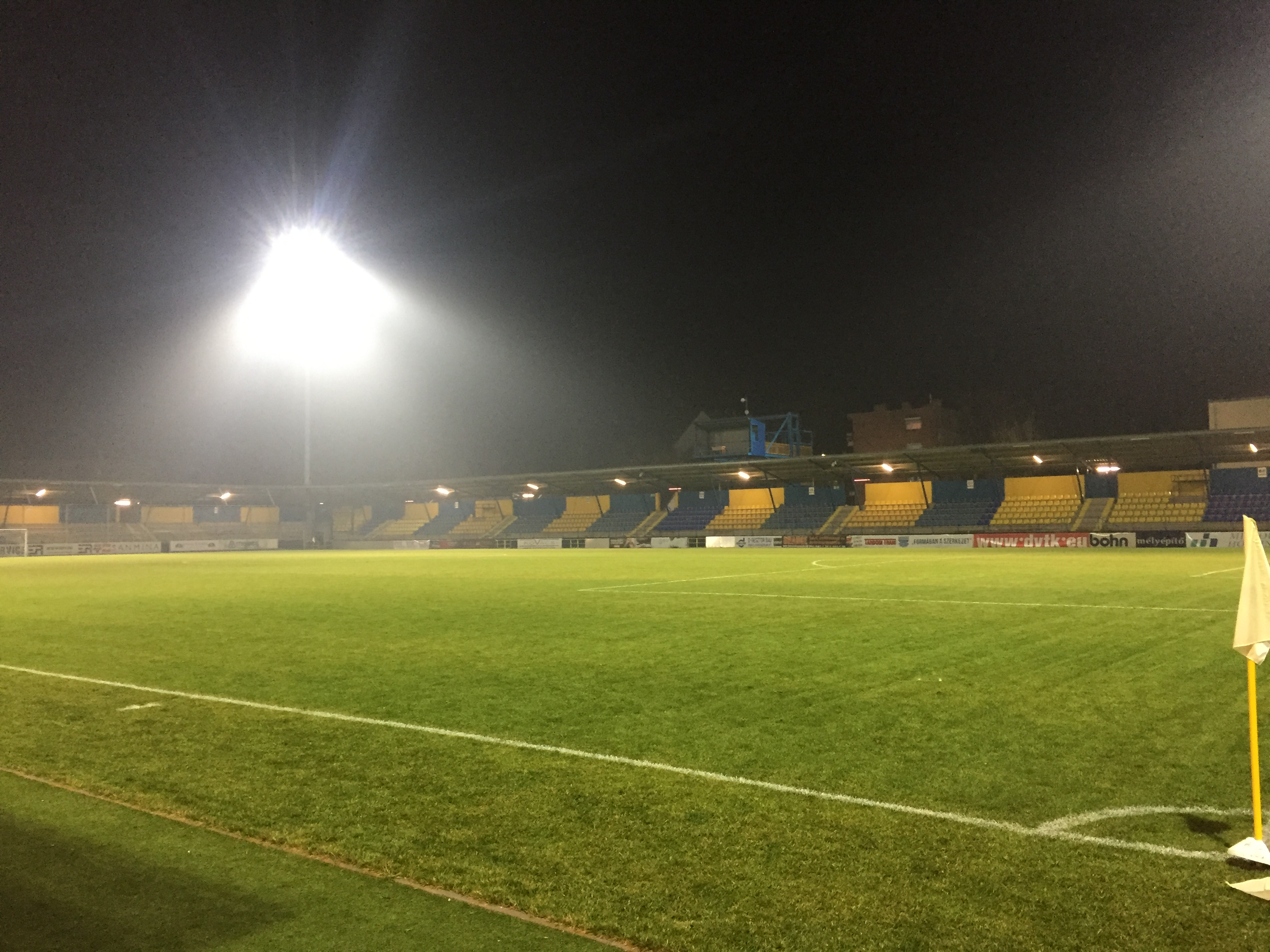
Városi Stadion

Mezőkövesd play their home matches at the Városi Stadion, located in Mezőkövesd. On 5 June 2016, the first match was played in the stadium. Mezőkövesd hosted Dunaújváros PASE on the 30th match day in the 2015–16 Nemzeti Bajnokság II season. The match was won by the home team which also resulted the club's promotion to the 2016–17 Nemzeti Bajnokság I.

In the 2016–17 Nemzeti Bajnokság I season, Diósgyőri VTK played some of their home matches due to the demolition of their home stadium Diósgyőri Stadion. Nevertheless, when Diósgyőr hosted Mezőkövesd on the 31st match day the match was played at Debrecen's home stadium, Nagyerdei Stadion.

== Honours ==
- Nemzeti Bajnokság II:
  - Winners (1): 2012–13
  - Runners-up (1): 2015–16
- Magyar Kupa:
  - Runners-up (1): 2019–20

== Players ==
=== Current squad ===
As of 20 January, 2026

Note: Flags indicate national team as defined under FIFA eligibility rules; some limited exceptions apply. Players may hold more than one non-FIFA nationality.

No.	Pos.	Nation	Player
1	GK	HUN	Máté Deczki
3	DF	HUN	Csaba Hornyák (on loan from Debreceni)
7	DF	HUN	István Csirmaz
8	MF	HUN	András Saja
9	FW	HUN	József Szalai (on loan from Paksi)
10	MF	HUN	Attila Lőrinczy
11	FW	HUN	Szabolcs Sáreczki
16	MF	HUN	Ádám Pintér
18	MF	HUN	Mátyás Vidnyánszky (on loan from Debreceni)
19	MF	HUN	Mátyás Gresó
20	DF	HUN	Péter Zachán
21	DF	HUN	Patrik Ternován

No.	Pos.	Nation	Player
26	MF	HUN	Lajos Bertus
41	DF	HUN	Bence Keresztes
42	GK	HUN	Bence Dojcsák (on loan from Diósgyőri)
46	MF	HUN	Ádám Merényi (on loan from Kecskemét)
67	DF	HUN	Viktor Csörgő
69	FW	UKR	Nazar Kovalenko
70	MF	HUN	Gergő Csatári
75	GK	HUN	Dániel Winter
77	MF	HUN	Shandor Vayda
81	MF	HUN	Zoltán Varjas
97	FW	UKR	Bogdan Furdetskyi (on loan from Diósgyőri)

=== Out on loan ===
Note: Flags indicate national team as defined under FIFA eligibility rules; some limited exceptions apply. Players may hold more than one non-FIFA nationality.

No.	Pos.	Nation	Player

=== Players with multiple nationalities ===
- (Ukraine) (Hungary) Shandor Vayda

== Managers ==
- (Hungary) Géza Huszák (2 April 2008 – 3 October 2011)
- (Hungary) György Szabados (7 October 2011 – 21 March 2012)
- (Hungary) György Véber (21 March 2012 – 5 May 2014)
- (Hungary) László Tóth (6 May 2014 – 21 March 21, 2015)
- (Hungary) Tamás Lucsánszky (25 March 2015 – December 2015)
- (Hungary) Miklós Benczés (4 June 2015-9 November 2015)
- (Hungary) Attila Pintér (30 December 2015 – 22 December 2016)
- (Serbia) Tomislav Sivić (27 December 2016 – 2 May 2017)
- (Slovakia) Mikuláš Radványi (2 May 2017 – 16 October 2017)
- (Hungary) Attila Kuttor (17 October 2017 – 10 November 2020)
- (Hungary) Attila Pintér (11 November 2015 – 6 October 2021)
- (Hungary) Attila Supka (6 October 2021 – 6 September 2022)
- (Hungary) Attila Kuttor (14 September 2022 – 13 February 2024)
- (Serbia) Milan Milanović (14 February 2024-28 May 2024)
- (Hungary) Mihály Tóth (29 May 2024- 4 September 2024)
- (Hungary) Aurél Csertői (9 September 2024 - present)
