= 1984–85 Magyar Kupa =

Tournament details
- Country: Hungary

Final positions
- Champions: Budapest Honvéd
- Runners-up: Tatabánya

The 1984–85 Magyar Kupa (English: Hungarian Cup) was the 45th season of Hungary's annual knock-out cup football competition.

== Quarter-finals ==
Games were played on April 10, 1985.

Team 1	Score	Team 2
Budapest Honvéd	2–1	Ferencváros
Diósgyőr	2–1	Rába ETO Győr
Szegedi Dózsa SC	1–5	Tatabánya
Zalaegerszeg	0–1	MTK-VM

== Semi-finals ==
Games were played on May 1, 1985.

Team 1	Score	Team 2
Diósgyőr	0–1	Budapest Honvéd
Tatabánya	1–0	MTK-VM

== Final ==
5 June 1985
17:30 (UTC+2)

Budapest Honvéd	5–0	Tatabánya FC
Dajka 12'; Kovács 17', 90'; Détári 20', 71'	Report

Népstadion, Budapest
Attendance: 3,000
Referee: Róbert Jaczina (Hungary)

== See also ==
- 1984–85 Nemzeti Bajnokság I
