= 1988–89 Magyar Kupa =

Tournament details
- Country: Hungary

Final positions
- Champions: Budapest Honvéd
- Runners-up: Ferencváros

The 1988–89 Magyar Kupa (English: Hungarian Cup) was the 49th season of Hungary's annual knock-out cup football competition.

== Quarter-finals ==
Games were played on April 19 and May 3, 1989.

Team 1	Agg.	Team 2	1st leg	2nd leg
Répcelaki Bányász	1–7	Ferencváros	0–3	1–4
Budapesti Honvéd	4–3	Győri ETO	3–1	1–2
Dömsöd	1–6	Siófoki Bányász	0–1	1–5
Váci Izzó	3–3 (a)	Zalaegerszeg	2–2	1–1

== Semi-finals ==
Games were played on May 10 and May 17, 1989.

Team 1	Agg.	Team 2	1st leg	2nd leg
Budapesti Honvéd	3–2	Zalaegerszeg	1–1	2–1
Siófoki Bányász	2–4	Ferencváros	2–1	0–3

== Final ==
14 June 1989
19:00 (UTC+2)

Budapest Honvéd	1–0	Ferencváros
Fodor 63'	Report

Népstadion, Budapest
Attendance: 20,000
Referee: László Győri (Hungary)

== See also ==
- 1988–89 Nemzeti Bajnokság I
