= 1931–32 Magyar Kupa =

Tournament details
- Country: Hungary

Final positions
- Champions: Hungária FC
- Runners-up: Ferencváros FC

The 1931–32 Magyar Kupa (English: Hungarian Cup) was the 14th season of Hungary's annual knock-out cup football competition.

== Final ==
5 June 1932
17:30 (UTC+2)

Hungária FC	1–1	Ferencváros FC
Titkos 89'	Report	Kohut 13'

Üllői úti stadion, Budapest
Attendance: 8,000
Referee: Attila Juhász (Hungary)

=== Replay ===
7 September 1932
17:30 (UTC+2)

Hungária FC	4–3	Ferencváros FC
Szabó 27'; Titkos 31', 80'; Barátky 32'	Report	Toldi 7'; Turay 15'; Táncos 75'

Hungária körúti stadion, Budapest
Attendance: 8,000
Referee: Géza Gombos (Hungary)

== See also ==
- 1931–32 Nemzeti Bajnokság I
