= 1940–41 Magyar Kupa =

Tournament details
- Country: Hungary

Final positions
- Champions: Szolnoki MÁV SE
- Runners-up: Salgótarjáni BTC

The 1940–41 Magyar Kupa (English: Hungarian Cup) was the 18th season of Hungary's annual knock-out cup football competition.

== Final ==
29 June 1941
17:30 (UTC+2)

Szolnoki MÁV SE	3–0	Salgótarjáni BTC
Kolláth 23'; Szántó 37', 81'; Nagy 42'	Report

Üllői úti stadion, Budapest
Attendance: 7,000
Referee: Lajos Nagy (Hungary)

== See also ==
- 1940–41 Nemzeti Bajnokság I
