= 1924–25 Magyar Kupa =

Tournament details
- Country: Hungary

Final positions
- Champions: MTK Budapest FC
- Runners-up: Újpest FC

The 1924–25 Magyar Kupa (English: Hungarian Cup) was the 8th season of Hungary's annual knock-out cup football competition.

== Final ==
28 March 1926
17:30 (UTC+2)

MTK Budapest FC	4–0	Újpest FC
Opata (2x); Senkey; Fogl	Report

Hungária körúti stadion, Budapest
Attendance: 12,000
Referee: ? (Hungary)

== See also ==
- 1924–25 Nemzeti Bajnokság I
