= 1974–75 Magyar Kupa =

Tournament details
- Country: Hungary

Final positions
- Champions: Újpesti Dózsa
- Runners-up: Szombathelyi Haladás VSE

The 1974–75 Magyar Kupa (English: Hungarian Cup) was the 35th season of Hungary's annual knock-out cup football competition.

== Final ==
1 May 1975
17:00 (UTC+2)

Újpesti Dózsa	3–2	Szombathelyi Haladás VSE
Horváth 62', 68', 70'	Report	Farkas 35'; Kereki 58'

Népstadion, Budapest
Attendance: 3,000
Referee: Károly Palotai (Hungary)

== See also ==
- 1974–75 Nemzeti Bajnokság I
