= 1913–14 Magyar Kupa =

Tournament details
- Country: Hungary

Final positions
- Champions: MTK Budapest FC
- Runners-up: Magyar AC

The 1913–14 Magyar Kupa (English: Hungarian Cup) was the 5th season of Hungary's annual knock-out cup football competition.

== Final ==
7 June 1914
17:30 (UTC+2)

MTK Budapest FC	4–0	Magyar AC
Konrád 10', 65'; Taussig 15'; Rácz 30'	Report

Üllői úti stadion, Budapest
Attendance: 8,000
Referee: Mátyás Palócz (Hungary)

== See also ==
- 1913–14 Nemzeti Bajnokság I
