= 1970 Magyar Kupa =

Tournament details
- Country: Hungary

Final positions
- Champions: Újpesti Dózsa SC
- Runners-up: Komlói Bányász SK

The 1970 Magyar Kupa (English: Hungarian Cup) was the 31st season of Hungary's annual knock-out cup football competition.

== Final ==
20 August 1970
17:00 (UTC+2)

Újpesti Dózsa SC	3–2	Komlói Bányász SK
Dunai 7'; Fazekas 35', 64'	Report	Juhász 38'; Horváth 90'

Népstadion, Budapest
Attendance: 5,000
Referee: Gusztáv Bircsák (Hungary)

== See also ==
- 1970 Nemzeti Bajnokság I
