= 1922–23 Magyar Kupa =

Tournament details
- Country: Hungary

Final positions
- Champions: MTK Budapest FC
- Runners-up: Újpest FC

The 1922–23 Magyar Kupa (English: Hungarian Cup) was the 7th season of Hungary's annual knock-out cup football competition.

== Final ==
17 June 1923
17:30 (UTC+2)

MTK Budapest FC	4–1	Újpest FC
Opata 14'; Siklósi 30', 38'; Orth 74'	Report	Palausz 81'

Üllői úti stadion, Budapest
Attendance: 7,000
Referee: József Hajós (Hungary)

== See also ==
- 1922–23 Nemzeti Bajnokság I
