= 1951–52 Magyar Kupa =

Tournament details
- Country: Hungary

Final positions
- Champions: Budapesti Bástya
- Runners-up: Dorogi Bányász

The 1951–52 Magyar Kupa (English: Hungarian Cup) was the 22nd season of Hungary's annual knock-out cup football competition.

== Final ==
1 June 1952
17:00 (UTC+2)

Budapesti Bástya	3–2	Dorogi Bányász
Zakariás 16'; Molnár 28'; Palotás 41'	Report	Aspirány 8'; Pozsonyi 57'

Latorca utca, Budapest
Attendance: 14,000
Referee: György Siklósi (Hungary)

== See also ==
- 1952 Nemzeti Bajnokság I
