= 1983–84 Magyar Kupa =

Tournament details
- Country: Hungary

Final positions
- Champions: Siófoki Bányász
- Runners-up: Rába ETO Győr

The 1983–84 Magyar Kupa (English: Hungarian Cup) was the 44th season of Hungary's annual knock-out cup football competition.

== Quarter-finals ==
Games were played on May 2, 1984.

Team 1	Score	Team 2
Békéscsaba Előre Spartacus	2–1	Budapest Honvéd
Siófoki Bányász	4–2	Ferencváros
Olefin	2–5	Rába ETO Győr
MTK-VM	0–0; 3–4 (pen.)	Tatabányai Bányász

== Semi-finals ==
Games were played on May 9, 1984.

Team 1	Score	Team 2
Siófoki Bányász	1–0	Tatabányai Bányász
Békéscsaba Előre Spartacus	3–3; 3–4 (pen.)	Rába ETO Győr

== Final ==
9 June 1984
19:00 (UTC+2)

Siófoki Bányász	2–1	Rába ETO Győr
Szabó 55'; Horváth 88'	Report	Szentes 20'

Sóstói Stadion, Székesfehérvár
Attendance: 17,000
Referee: Lajos Hartmann (Hungary)

== See also ==
- 1983–84 Nemzeti Bajnokság I
