= 1978–79 Magyar Kupa =

Tournament details
- Country: Hungary

Final positions
- Champions: Rába ETO Győr
- Runners-up: Ferencvárosi TC

The 1978–79 Magyar Kupa (English: Hungarian Cup) was the 39th season of Hungary's annual knock-out cup football competition.

== Final ==
21 May 1979
20:00 (UTC+2)

Rába ETO Győr	1–0	Ferencvárosi TC
Szabó 17'	Report

Népstadion, Budapest
Attendance: 6,000
Referee: László Pádár (Hungary)

== See also ==
- 1978–79 Nemzeti Bajnokság I
