= 1910–11 Magyar Kupa =

Tournament details
- Country: Hungary

Final positions
- Champions: MTK Budapest
- Runners-up: Magyar AC

The 1910–11 Magyar Kupa (English: Hungarian Cup) was the 2nd season of Hungary's annual knock-out cup football competition.

== Final ==
2 October 1912
17:30 (UTC+2)

MTK Budapest FC	1–0	Magyar AC
Kertész 44'	Report

Üllői úti stadion, Budapest
Attendance: 15,000
Referee: Ferenc Schubert (Hungary)

== See also ==
- 1910–11 Nemzeti Bajnokság I
