= 1925–26 Magyar Kupa =

Tournament details
- Country: Hungary

Final positions
- Champions: Kispesti AC
- Runners-up: Budapesti EAC

The 1925–26 Magyar Kupa (English: Hungarian Cup) was the 9th season of Hungary's annual knock-out cup football competition.

== Final ==
8 December 1926
17:30 (UTC+2)

Kispesti AC	1–1 (a.e.t.)	Budapesti EAC
Jurácska	Report	Pótz

Postás pálya, Budapest
Attendance: 500
Referee: Vilmos Baron (Hungary)

=== Replay ===
19 December 1926
17:30 (UTC+2)

Kispesti AC	3–2 (a.e.t.)	Budapesti EAC
Juhász 5'; Mátéffy 100'; Gregor 157'	Report	Grolmusz 12' (o.g.); Kertész 113'

Postás pálya, Budapest
Attendance: 150
Referee: László Szél (Hungary)

== See also ==
- 1925–26 Nemzeti Bajnokság I
