= 1968 Magyar Kupa =

Tournament details
- Country: Hungary

Final positions
- Champions: MTK Budapest FC
- Runners-up: Budapest Honvéd SE

The 1968 Magyar Kupa (English: Hungarian Cup) was the 29th season of Hungary's annual knock-out cup football competition.

== Final ==
20 August 1968
17:00 (UTC+2)

MTK Budapest FC	2–1	Budapest Honvéd SE
Szuromi 8'; Oborzil 60' (pen.)	Report	Fekete 28'

Népstadion, Budapest
Attendance: 10,000
Referee: Gábor Soós (Hungary)

== See also ==
- 1968 Nemzeti Bajnokság I
