= 1982–83 Magyar Kupa =

Tournament details
- Country: Hungary

Final positions
- Champions: Újpesti Dózsa
- Runners-up: Budapest Honvéd

The 1982–83 Magyar Kupa (English: Hungarian Cup) was the 43rd season of Hungary's annual knock-out cup football competition.

== Quarter-finals ==
Games were played on April 6, 1983.

Team 1	Score	Team 2
Újpesti Dózsa	2–2; 2–1 (pen.)	Tatabányai Bányász
Csepel	3–1	Pécs
Budapest Honvéd	2–2; 12–11 (pen.)	Ferencváros
Békéscsaba Előre Spartacus	1–0	Vasas

== Semi-finals ==
Games were played on May 1, 1983.

Team 1	Score	Team 2
Csepel	0–4	Budapest Honvéd
Újpesti Dózsa	6–3	Békéscsaba Előre Spartacus

== Final ==
4 May 1983
17:00 (UTC+2)

Újpesti Dózsa	3–2	Budapest Honvéd
Törőcsik 5'; Kisznyér 35' (pen.); Kiss 78'	Report	Gere 48'; Kozma 76'

Népstadion, Budapest
Attendance: 5,000
Referee: Károly Palotai (Hungary)

== See also ==
- 1982–83 Nemzeti Bajnokság I
