= 1964 Magyar Kupa =

Tournament details
- Country: Hungary

Final positions
- Champions: Budapest Honvéd SE
- Runners-up: Győri Vasas ETO

The 1964 Magyar Kupa (English: Hungarian Cup) was the 25th season of Hungary's annual knock-out cup football competition.

== Final ==
7 November 1964
17:00 (UTC+2)

| Budapest Honvéd SE | 1–0 | Győri Vasas ETO |
|---|---|---|
| Komora 15' | Report |

Népstadion, Budapest
Attendance: 8,000
Referee: Gyula Balla (Hungary)

== See also ==
- 1964 Nemzeti Bajnokság I
