= 1967 Magyar Kupa =

Tournament details
- Country: Hungary

Final positions
- Champions: Rába ETO Győr
- Runners-up: Salgótarjáni BTC

The 1967 Magyar Kupa (English: Hungarian Cup) was the 28th season of Hungary's annual knock-out cup football competition.

== Final ==
7 November 1967
17:00 (UTC+2)

Raba ETO Győr	1–0	Salgótarjáni BTC
Nell 14'	Report

Népstadion, Budapest
Attendance: 3,000
Referee: Gyula Hegyes (Hungary)

== See also ==
- 1967 Nemzeti Bajnokság I
