= 1965 Magyar Kupa =

Tournament details
- Country: Hungary

Final positions
- Champions: Győri Vasas ETO
- Runners-up: Diósgyőri VTK

The 1965 Magyar Kupa (English: Hungarian Cup) was the 26th season of Hungary's annual knock-out cup football competition.

== Final ==
14 November 1965
17:00 (UTC+2)

Győri Vasas ETO	4–0	Diósgyőri VTK
Keglovich 19', 30'; Soproni 32' (pen.); Varsányi 42'	Report

Népstadion, Budapest
Attendance: 3,000
Referee: János Radó (Hungary)

== See also ==
- 1965 Nemzeti Bajnokság I
