= 1969 Magyar Kupa =

Tournament details
- Country: Hungary

Final positions
- Champions: Újpesti Dózsa SC
- Runners-up: Budapest Honvéd SE

The 1969 Magyar Kupa (English: Hungarian Cup) was the 30th season of Hungary's annual knock-out cup football competition.

== Final ==
20 August 1969
17:00 (UTC+2)

Újpesti Dózsa SC	3–1	Budapest Honvéd SE
Dunai 40'; Bene 43'; Nagy 47'	Report	Tussinger 83'

Népstadion, Budapest
Attendance: 15,000
Referee: János Biróczky (Hungary)

== See also ==
- 1969 Nemzeti Bajnokság I
