= 1998–99 Magyar Kupa =

Tournament details
- Country: Hungary

Final positions
- Champions: Debrecen (1st title)
- Runners-up: Tatabánya

The 1998–99 Magyar Kupa (English: Hungarian Cup) was the 60th season of Hungary's annual knock-out cup football competition.

== Quarter-finals ==
Games were played on March 16 and March 17, 1999.

Team 1	Score	Team 2
Győri ETO	1–0	Nyíregyháza Spartacus
Vác	3–1	Szombathelyi Haladás
Tatabánya	3–1	Újpest
Debrecen	3–1	Diósgyőr

== Semi-finals ==
Games were played on April 14 and April 15, 1999.

Team 1	Score	Team 2
Debrecen	2–1	Győri ETO
Tatabánya	3–0	Vác

== Final ==
20 May 1999
20:00 (UTC+2)

Debrecen	2–1	Tatabánya
Bagoly 21'; Gelei 80' (o.g.)	Report	Kiprich 50'

Ligeti stadion, Vác
Attendance: 12,000
Referee: Sándor Puhl (Hungary)

== See also ==
- 1998–99 Nemzeti Bajnokság I
