= 1972–73 Magyar Kupa =

Tournament details
- Country: Hungary

Final positions
- Champions: Vasas SC
- Runners-up: Budapest Honvéd SE

The 1972–73 Magyar Kupa (English: Hungarian Cup) was the 33rd season of Hungary's annual knock-out cup football competition.

== Final ==
1 May 1973
17:00 (UTC+2)

Vasas SC	4–3 (a.e.t.)	Budapest Honvéd SE
Várady 7', 40', 98'; Kovács 77'	Report	Pál 14'; Kozma 55', 83'

Népstadion, Budapest
Attendance: 10,000
Referee: Lajos Somlai (Hungary)

== See also ==
- 1972–73 Nemzeti Bajnokság I
