= Magyar AC =

Hungarian football club

- Full name: Magyar Atlétikai Club
- Short name: MAC
- Founded: 1875
- Ground: Margitszigeti Atlétikai Centrum
- Capacity: 1,637
Home colours	Away colours

Magyar Atlétikai Club (English: Hungarian Athletic Club) is a Hungarian football club from the city of Budapest.

== History ==
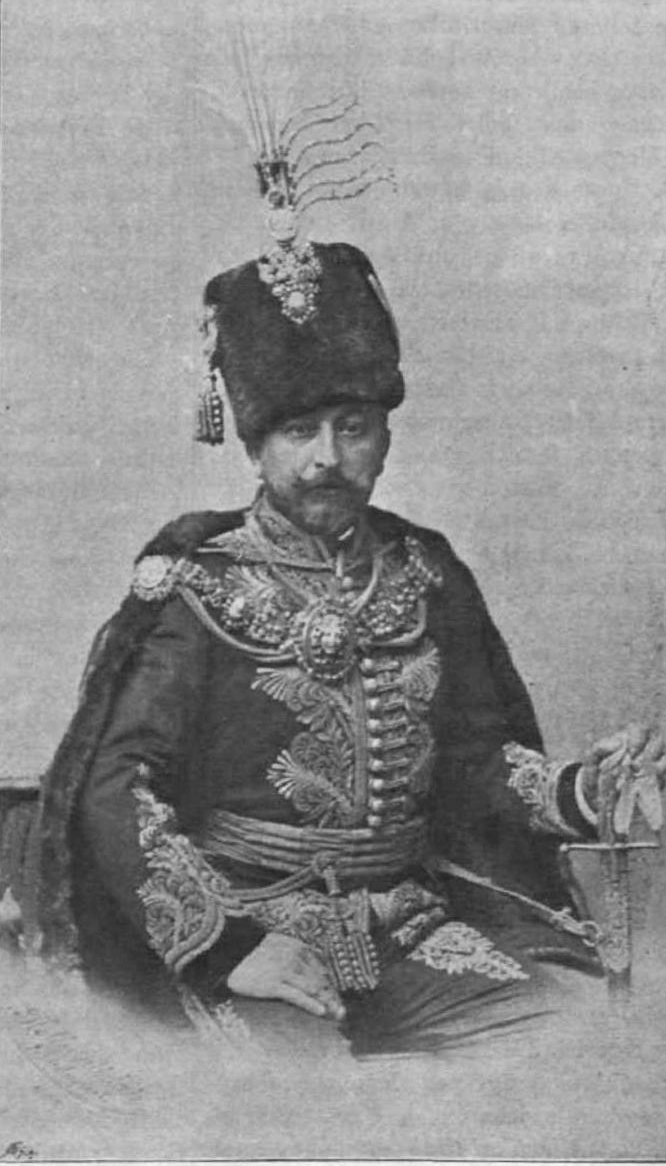
Géza Andrássy, president of the club

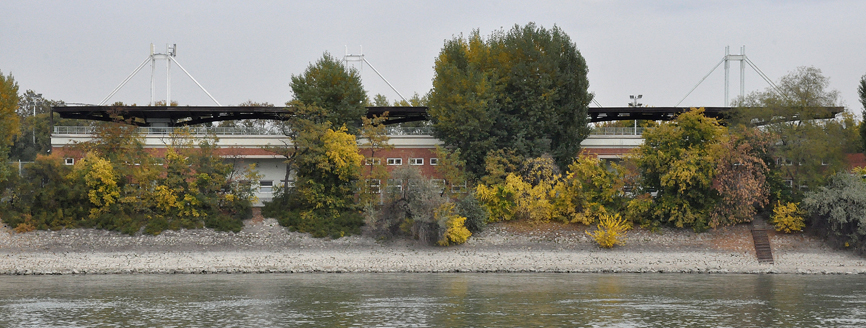
The Magyar AC stadium in Budapest, Margitsziget

Magyar AC debuted in the 1903 season of the Hungarian League and finished seventh.

== Name Changes ==
- 1875–1945: Magyar Athletikai Club
- 1928: the football department was dissolved
- 1988–1993: Magyar Athletikai Club
- 1993: merger with Népstadion Szabadidő Egyesület
- 1993–2011: MAC Népstadion SE
- 2011–2013: Magyar Athletikai Club
- 2013: merger with Grund 1986 FC

== Honours ==
- Hungarian Cup:
  - Runner-up (1): 1910–11
- Challenge Cup:
  - Runner-up (1): 1904–05
