= 2000–01 Magyar Kupa =

Tournament details
- Country: Hungary

Final positions
- Champions: Debrecen (2nd title)
- Runners-up: Videoton

The 2000–01 Magyar Kupa (English: Hungarian Cup) was the 61st season of Hungary's annual knock-out cup football competition.

== Quarter-finals ==
Games were played on March 28, 2001.

Team 1	Score	Team 2
BKV Előre	2–1	Szolnoki MÁV
Vasas	0–2	Videoton
Tatabánya	1–0	MTK Hungária
Debrecen	2–2 (a.e.t.); 4–2 (pen.)	Újpest

== Semi-finals ==
Games were played on May 2 and 8, 2001.

Team 1	Score	Team 2
Debrecen	2–0	Tatabánya
Videoton	1–0	BKV Előre

== Final ==
13 June 2001
19:00 (UTC+2)

Debrecen	5–2	Videoton
Szatmári 39'; Kerekes 47'; Bajzát 65', 84'; Ulveczki 79'	Report	Julinho 78'; Zombori 92'

Üllői úti stadion, Budapest
Attendance: 11,000
Referee: Attila Ábrahám (Hungary)

== See also ==
- 2000–01 Nemzeti Bajnokság I
- 2000–01 Nemzeti Bajnokság II
