= 1966 Magyar Kupa =

Tournament details
- Country: Hungary

Final positions
- Champions: Rába ETO Győr
- Runners-up: Ferencvárosi TC

The 1966 Magyar Kupa (English: Hungarian Cup) was the 27th season of Hungary's annual knock-out cup football competition.

== Final ==
4 April 1967
17:00 (UTC+2)

Rába ETO Győr	1–1	Ferencvárosi TC
Szaló 9'	Report	Karába 85'

Népstadion, Budapest
Attendance: 10,000
Referee: Gyula Gere (Hungary)

=== Replay ===
26 April 1967
17:00 (UTC+2)

Rába ETO Győr	3–2	Ferencvárosi TC
Győrfi 20'; Izsáki 67'; Vajda 75' (o.g.)	Report	Rátkai 10'; Novák 59'

Népstadion, Budapest
Attendance: 17,000
Referee: Gyula Emsberger (Hungary)

== See also ==
- 1966 Nemzeti Bajnokság I
