= Hungária körúti stadion =

Stadium in Budapest, Hungary

- Interactive map of Hungária körúti stadion
- Full name: Hungária körúti stadion
- Location: Józsefváros, Budapest, Hungary
- Coordinates: 47°29′27.31″N 19°6′24.21″E
- Owner: MTK Budapest
- Operator: MTK Budapest
- Capacity: 40,000
- Surface: Grass; Field
- Field size: 100 m × 60 m (330 ft × 200 ft)

Construction
- Opened: 1912
- Closed: 1945
- Architects: Elemér Goll; Frigyes Verner; Károly Markovits (club house)

Tenants
- MTK Budapest (1912–45); Hungary (1913–-39); Szürketaxi FC (1939–40)

Hungária körúti stadion was a stadium in Józsefváros, Budapest, Hungary. The stadium opened in 1912 and served as the home for the MTK Budapest FC until 1945. The stadium was demolished during World War II, and a new stadium built in its place from 1946 to 1947.

== History ==
MTK Budapest's arch rival Ferencváros opened its new stadium in 1911 which prompted MTK Budapest to start the construction of its new stadium. The growing number of spectators of MTK Budapest could not be accommodated at the Millenáris Sporttelep or at the MAC pitch. In the spring of 1911, the MTK received a parcel of land at the corner of Hungária kőrút and Temető dűlő for the nominal rent of one gold coin annually. By summer, the stadium company had raised 400,000 arany korona allowing it to begin construction. The field consisted of a 100 by 60 metres (330 ft × 200 ft) pitch surrounded by an athletic track to host international athletic competitions. The long sides of the field held the two stands connected by stone stairs with locker rooms and support facilities under the main stand. the changing rooms were built. The stadium opened on 31 March 1912 with the MTK Budapest–Ferencváros 1911–12 Nemzeti Bajnokság I match which ended with a 1–0 victory for the hosts. In the autumn of 1912 the construction of the club house, designed by Károly Markovits, began and it opened in December 1913. The club house held a hall for wrestling, fencing, offices and a restaurant.

The stadium suffered damage during World War II and was completely rebuilt after 1945.

== Milestone matches ==
31 March 1912	MTK Budapest FC (Hungary)	1–0	(Hungary) Ferencváros	1911–12 Nemzeti Bajnokság I First match
	Bese 34', 43'	[ (Report)]
