= Győri ETO FC =

ETO FC
- Full name: Egyetértés Torna Osztály Futball Club
- Founded: 1904; 122 years ago
- Ground: ETO Park
- Capacity: 15,600
- Owner: Bálint Világi
- Manager: Efraín Juárez
- League: NB I
- 2025–26: NB I, 1st of 12 (champions)
- Website: www.eto.hu
Home colours	Away colours	colours

Egyetértés Torna Osztály Futball Club (ETO FC; lit. 'Concordance Gymnastics Department Football Club'), called Győri ETO FC ([ˈɟøːri], DYURR-ee) or just ETO, is a Hungarian professional football club from the city of Győr.

The club has won the Hungarian League five times. Their best European performance was when they reached the semi-finals of the 1964–65 European Cup. In 1904 the club was founded as Győri Vagongyár ETO and has undergone many name changes since. The colours of the club are green and white.

== History ==
Győri ETO FC, a Hungarian professional football club, has a rich history that includes periods of great success and financial struggles. The club first reached the top Hungarian league in 1937. Their golden age was in the 1960s and early 1980s, when they won the Hungarian National Championship in 1963 and again in 1982 and 1983. During this time, they also competed in various European tournaments against notable teams like Benfica, Juventus, and Manchester United. After a less successful period in the 1990s, the club faced financial difficulties, leading to their relegation to the third division in 2015. However, they were promoted back to the second division in 2017 and recently returned to the top division in 2024. In 2026, the club won their fifth league title.

== Crest and colours ==
The colours of the club are green and white. This combination of colours is very common in Hungary, as it is also used by clubs such as Ferencváros, Szombathelyi Haladás, Paks.

=== Naming history ===
- 1904: Győri Vagongyár ETO
- 1950: Győri Vasas SC ETO
- 1952: Győri Vasas
- 1953: Vasas SE Győr
- 1954: Wilhelm Pieck Vasas ETO SK Győr
- 1957: Magyar Wilhelm Pieck Vagon- és Gépgyár ETO Győr
- 1957: Győri Vasas ETO
- 1965: Rába ETO Győr
- 1985: Győri ETO FC
- 1992: Rába ETO FC Győr
- 1994: Győri ETO FC
- 2015: ETO FC Győr
- 2017: WKW ETO FC Győr
- 2022: ETO FC Győr
- 2025: ETO FC

=== Manufacturers and shirt sponsors ===
The following table shows in detail Győri ETO FC kit manufacturers and shirt sponsors by year:

Period	Kit manufacturer	Shirt sponsor
−2001	adidas	Rába
2001–2003	Nike	Rába
2003–2004	Jako	Quaestor
2004–2010	adidas	Quaestor
2010–2011	Puma	Quaestor
2011–2014	Puma	Quaestor / Audi
2014–2015	adidas	Quaestor / Audi
2015–2016	Erima	–
2017–2024	adidas	WKW automative
2025–	macron	Kukkonia

== Stadium ==
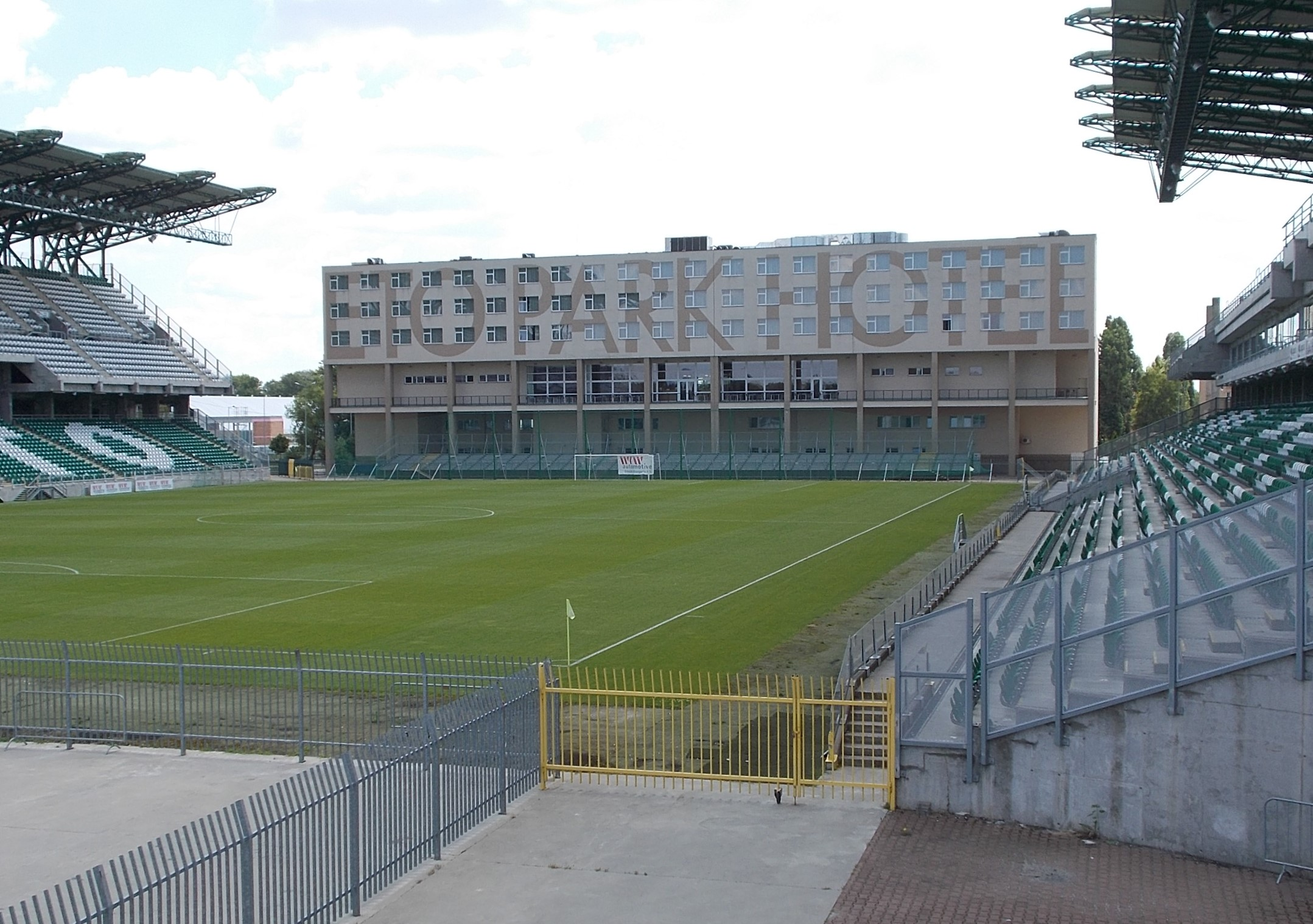
ETO Park

The home of the club is the multi-purpose stadium ETO Park. It was opened in 2008 as a replacement for Stadion ETO. Its capacity is 16,000 but if necessary the stadium can be expanded in order to host 30,000 spectators. The stadium complex also includes three grass practice pitches and one synthetic practice pitch, as well as two indoor pitches. A hotel can be found next to the pitch. The stadium can also host cultural events such as concerts and exhibitions. The style of the stadium is 'a la English' that is open at the corners.

The stadium is also home to the national team of Hungary. On 3 March 2010 Hungary drew with Russia in a friendly match. 16,000 spectators attended the match.

On 29 February 2012, Hungary hosted Bulgaria in a friendly match. Although Szalai scored in the 42nd minute, a late equalizer was delivered by Bozhinov.

On 7 June 2013, Csaba Tarsoly said that the ETO Park is unique in Hungary that it was built without any governmental support. The facility corresponds to the UEFA stadium criteria, except for the fact that a UEFA Champions League or UEFA Europa League final cannot be played at the stadium since it is not able to host 30,000 spectators.

== Ownership ==
On 14 June 2001, the Quaestor Financial Hungaria Kft bought the club and the stadium from the Rába Rt.

On 12 May 2013, Csaba Tarsoly, the president of the club, said that he had been waiting for this winning of the Hungarian League for 12 years.

On 9 March 2015, the Quaestor Financial Hungaria Kft. went bankrupt.

On 14 March 2015, the Audi finished supporting the club due to the unpredictability caused by the bankruptcy of the Quaestor Financial Hungaria Kft.

On 22 April 2015, the mayor of Győr, Zsolt Borkai said that the club will compete either in the Nemzeti Bajnokság III or in the county championship from the 2015–16 season due to the fact that the club will not be able to receive license from the Hungarian Football Federation since the club has amassed a 200 million HUF of debt.

On 23 April 2015, it was revealed that an English investor is interested in the club.

The promotion to the 2017–18 Nemzeti Bajnokság II aroused the interest of different investor. Among the investors there is a Belgian group who showed interest in purchasing the club and their estates.

In February 2022, Oszkár Világi became the owner of the club.

== Supporters and rivalries ==
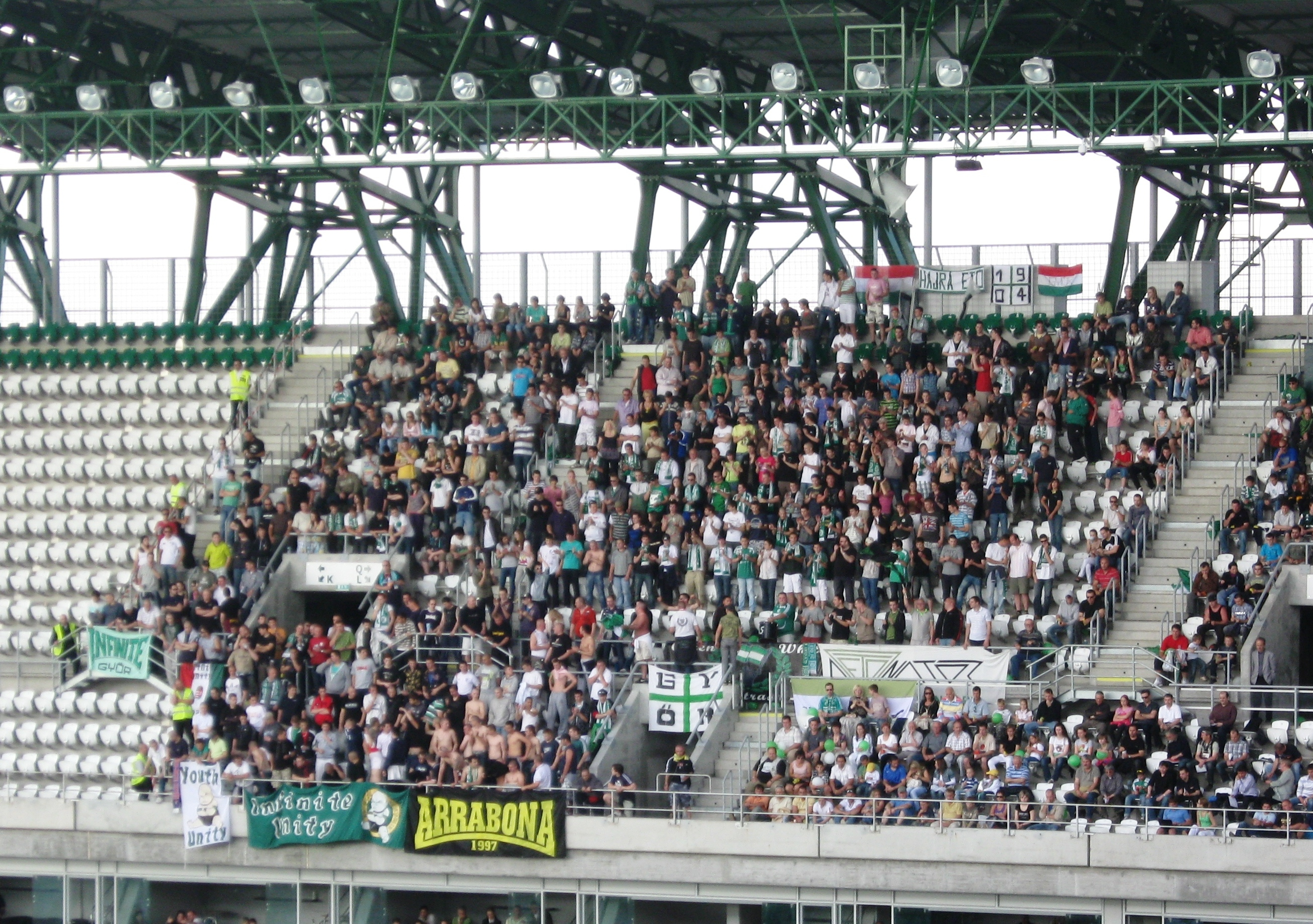
The ultras of Győr in Hungarian League match against Videoton (2010).

The supporters of the club are mainly from the city of Győr and the neighbouring area. However, the club have supporters from all over the country. Győr have a strong local rivalry with neighbouring clubs such as Szombathelyi Haladás and Zalaegerszeg. However, the club's historic rivals come from Budapest, due to the fierce competition between Győr, Ferencváros and Budapest Honvéd in the early 1980s. Currently the club are in rivalry with the most successful clubs of the country such as Debrecen and Videoton.

=== Notable supporter groups ===
- Green Lions (1993– )
- Wild West (1996– )
- Ultrá Arrabona (1997– )
- U.Cs.K. (1999–2013 )
- Infinite Unity (2002– )
- Detonator (2003– )
- Zöld Stílus (2006– )
- UBAS (2008– )
- G.W.U. (2009– )
- Youth Unity (2009– )
- ETO Fanatics (2017- )
- Green Legion (? - )
- Westside Veterans (2025 - )

== Honours ==
Győr being crowned Nemzeti Bajnokság I champions on 17 May 2026.

=== Domestic ===
- Nemzeti Bajnokság I
  - Winners (5): 1963, 1981–82, 1982–83, 2012–13, 2025–26
  - Runners-up (3): 1983–84, 1984–85, 2013–14
  - Third place (6): 1967, 1973–74, 1985–86, 2007–08, 2009–10, 2011–12
- Nemzeti Bajnokság II
  - Winners (3): 1942–43, 1957–58, 1959–60
  - Runners-up (1): 2023–24
- Nemzeti Bajnokság III
  - Winners (1): 2016–17
- Magyar Kupa
  - Winners (4): 1965, 1966, 1967, 1978–79
  - Runners-up (4): 1964, 1983–84, 2008–09, 2012–13
- Szuperkupa
  - Winners (1): 2013

=== European ===
- European Cup
  - Semi-finals: 1964–65

== Seasons ==
=== League positions ===
As of 12 July 2025

== Current squad ==
As of 14 September 2026
Injured player

Note: Flags indicate national team as defined under FIFA eligibility rules; some limited exceptions apply. Players may hold more than one non-FIFA nationality.

No.	Pos.	Nation	Player
2	DF	ROU	Ștefan Vlădoiu
5	MF	ROU	Paul Anton
7	MF	NGR	Peter Agba (on loan from (Israel) Maccabi Haifa)
9	FW	BIH	Luka Kulenović (on loan from (Netherlands) Heracles)
10	MF	ROU	Claudiu Bumba
11	FW	GAM	Nfansu Njie
14	FW	HUN	Márton Szép
16	GK	HUN	Balázs Megyeri
17	FW	HUN	Szabolcs Schön
19	MF	CRC	Jewison Bennette (on loan from (Ukraine) LNZ Cherkasy)
20	DF	HUN	Barnabás Bíró
21	MF	ROU	Efraim Bödő
23	DF	CRO	Daniel Štefulj
24	DF	SRB	Miljan Krpić (captain)
26	DF	HUN	Ádám Umathum
27	DF	NGR	Leon Balogun

No.	Pos.	Nation	Player
29	FW	MDA	Nicolae Rotaru
31	FW	GAM	Modou Lamin Marong
34	FW	MNE	Viktor Đukanović (on loan from (Sweden) Hammarby)
37	DF	SVK	Norbert Urblík
47	MF	HUN	Ádám Décsy
53	DF	HUN	Bálint Selyem
64	GK	HUN	Dániel Brecska
75	DF	HUN	Noel Csorba
76	FW	AUT	Jovan Živković
77	MF	COL	Élan Ricardo (on loan from (Turkey) Beşiktaş)
80	FW	SRB	Željko Gavrić (vice-captain)
90	MF	HUN	Kevin Bánáti
96	FW	HUN	Marcell Huszár
99	GK	SVK	Samuel Petráš
88	FW	SUI	Marc Giger

== Non-playing staff ==
=== Board of directors ===
Position	Name
Owner	(Slovakia) Bálint Világi
Technical Director	(Hungary) Ádám Nagy
Sporting Director	(Netherlands) Sander Van Praet
Operations and Academy Director	(Hungary) Máté Havas

=== Management ===
Position	Name
Head coach	(Mexico) Efraín Juárez
Assistant coach	(Belgium) Bernd Thijs
Assistant coach	(Hungary) Zoltán Lipták
Goalkeepers Coach	(Hungary) Zsolt Sebők
Fitness Trainer	(Hungary) Áron Kertész
Video Analyst	(Hungary) Zoltán Bartos
Video Analyst	(Hungary) Péter Pernyész
Technical Manager	(Hungary) Ádám Nagy
Masseur	(Hungary) Patrik Takács
Masseur	(Hungary) Milán Tóth

== Women's team ==
Győri ETO also have a women's team. They compete in the Női NB I and have won the Hungarian Women's Cup on two occasions (2022 and 2023).

== Other departments ==
Győri ETO has several successful departments, e.g., the handball teams won many national championships. The men's team also won the EHF Cup in 1986 as Rába Vasas ETO Győr. Particularly well known these days are the handball ladies, playing as Győri ETO Kézilabda Club (en. handball club), which is a five-time Champions League winner team.

== See also ==
- List of Győri ETO FC managers
- List of Győri ETO FC seasons
- Győri ETO FC in European football
