= 1998–99 Ferencvárosi TC season =

Ferencvárosi TC
1998–99 season
- Chairman: József Torgyán
- Manager: Tibor Nyilasi (until 17 December) (Croatia) Marijan Vlak
- Stadium: Üllői úti stadion
- NB 1: Runners-up
- Hungarian Cup: Round of 16
- UEFA Cup: Second qualifying round
- Top goalscorer: League: Imre Szabics (12); All: Imre Szabics (13)
- Highest home attendance: 10,246 vs Diósgyőr (24 October 1998)
- Lowest home attendance: 6,277 vs Kispest (16 June 1999)

== First team squad ==
Note: Flags indicate national team as defined under FIFA eligibility rules; some limited exceptions apply. Players may hold more than one non-FIFA nationality.

No.	Pos.	Nation	Player
1	GK	HUN	Milán Udvarácz
2	MF	HUN	Tibor Simon
3	DF	HUN	András Telek
4	MF	HUN	Norbert Nagy
5	DF	HUN	Mihály Szűcs
6	DF	HUN	Pál Lilik
7	MF	HUN	Attila Kriston
8	MF	HUN	Elek Nyilas
9	FW	ALB	Zenun Selimi
10	MF	HUN	Levente Schultz
11	FW	HUN	Zoltán Fülöp
12	MF	HUN	Miklós Lendvai
13	DF	HUN	Csaba Vámosi

No.	Pos.	Nation	Player
14	MF	HUN	Ákos Füzi
15	FW	HUN	Sándor Kulcsár
16	FW	HUN	Dénes Eszenyi
17	DF	HUN	János Mátyus
18	DF	HUN	Zoltán Jagodics
19	MF	CRO	Alen Bjelić
20	MF	HUN	Béla Kovács
21	MF	HUN	Ottó Vincze
22	GK	HUN	János Vámos
23	MF	HUN	Zoltán Bükszegi
24	MF	HUN	Tamás Bócz
25	FW	HUN	Tibor Fodor
—	FW	HUN	Imre Szabics

== Transfers ==
=== Summer ===
In: Note: Flags indicate national team as defined under FIFA eligibility rules; some limited exceptions apply. Players may hold more than one non-FIFA nationality.

No.	Pos.	Nation	Player
—	MF	HUN	Zoltán Bükszegi (from BVSC Budapest)
—	MF	HUN	Ákos Füzi (from BVSC Budapest)
—	FW	HUN	Zoltán Fülöp (from Békéscsaba)
—	GK	HUN	János Vámos (from Békéscsaba)
—	MF	HUN	Béla Kovács (from Kispest Honvéd)
—	DF	HUN	János Mátyus (from Kispest Honvéd)
—	MF	HUN	Attila Kriston (from Siófok)
—	MF	HUN	Miklós Lendvai (from (Switzerland) Lugano)
—	MF	HUN	Elek Nyilas (from (Israel) Maccabi Tel Aviv)
—	DF	HUN	András Telek (from (Slovakia) Košice)
—	FW	ALB	Zenun Selimi (from (Switzerland) Zug '94)

Out: Note: Flags indicate national team as defined under FIFA eligibility rules; some limited exceptions apply. Players may hold more than one non-FIFA nationality.

No.	Pos.	Nation	Player
—	FW	HUN	Flórián Albert (to (France) Red Star Paris)
—	DF	HUN	Attila Dragóner (to (Germany) Fortuna Köln)
—	MF	HUN	Csaba Felföldi (to Siófok)
—	GK	HUN	Attila Hajdu (to (Germany) Fortuna Köln)
—	FW	HUN	Ferenc Horváth (to (Belgium) Genk)
—	MF	HUN	Péter Lipcsei (to (Portugal) Porto)
—	FW	HUN	Tibor Márkus (to Siófok)
—	DF	YUG	Dejan Milovanović (to Dunaferr)
—	FW	HUN	Vasile Miriuță (to (Germany) Energie Cottbus)
—	MF	HUN	László Mlinkovics (to Matáv Sopron)
—	DF	HUN	József Mogyorósi (to Újpest)
—	FW	UKR	Ihor Nichenko (to Dunaferr)
—	DF	HUN	Tibor Pomper (to BVSC Budapest)
—	MF	HUN	Attila Sági (to Budafok)
—	FW	HUN	Illés Sitku (to Budafok)
—	GK	HUN	József Szeiler (Retired)
—	GK	HUN	János Tímár (to Haladás)
—	MF	HUN	Gábor Zavadszky (to Dunaferr)

=== Winter ===
In: Note: Flags indicate national team as defined under FIFA eligibility rules; some limited exceptions apply. Players may hold more than one non-FIFA nationality.

No.	Pos.	Nation	Player
15	FW	HUN	Sándor Kulcsár (from Diósgyőr)
16	FW	HUN	Dénes Eszenyi (from Újpest)
19	MF	CRO	Alen Bjelić (from (Croatia) NK Zagreb)
25	FW	HUN	Tibor Fodor (loan from Győr)

Out: Note: Flags indicate national team as defined under FIFA eligibility rules; some limited exceptions apply. Players may hold more than one non-FIFA nationality.

No.	Pos.	Nation	Player
15	DF	HUN	Tibor Baranyai (to Érd)
24	MF	YUG	Srđan Kostić (to Haladás)
—	MF	HUN	Gyula Hegedűs (loan to Kecskemét)
—	MF	HUN	Zsolt Limperger (to Érd)
—	FW	HUN	Károly Potemkin (to BVSC Budapest)

=== Nemzeti Bajnokság I ===
==== League table ====
Pos	Team	Pld	W	D	L	GF	GA	GD	Pts	Qualification or relegation
1	MTK Hungária (C)	34	27	2	5	77	26	+51	83	Qualification for Champions League first qualifying round
2	Ferencváros	34	19	7	8	61	40	+21	64	Qualification for UEFA Cup qualifying round
3	Újpest	34	20	3	11	58	40	+18	63	Qualification for UEFA Cup qualifying round
4	Győr	34	16	11	7	53	39	+14	59	
5	Dunaferr	34	17	6	11	54	46	+8	57	

Source: soccerway.com
Rules for classification: 1st points; 2nd goal difference; 3rd goals scored; 4th overall wins.
(C) Champions

==== Results summary ====
Overall								Home						Away					
Pld	W	D	L	GF	GA	GD	Pts	W	D	L	GF	GA	GD	W	D	L	GF	GA	GD
34	19	7	8	61	40	+21	64	11	3	3	36	16	+20	8	4	5	25	24	+1

Last updated: 16 June 1999.
Source: NB1

==== Results by round ====
Round	1	2	3	4	5	6	7	8	9	10	11	12	13	14	15	16	17	18	19	20	21	22	23	24	25	26	27	28	29	30	31	32	33	34
Ground	H	A	H	A	H	A	H	A	H	A	H	H	A	H	A	H	A	A	H	A	H	A	H	A	H	A	H	A	A	H	A	H	A	H
Result	W	W	D	D	W	W	W	L	D	D	D	L	W	W	L	W	D	W	W	L	W	W	W	L	W	W	W	D	W	W	W	L	L	L
Position	5	5	4	5	4	3	2	2	2	4	6	5	5	4	6	4	7	6	3	6	5	3	3	3	3	2	2	2	2	2	2	2	2	2

Updated to match(es) played on 16 June 1999. Source: Matches
A = Away; H = Home; W = Win; D = Draw; L = Loss

==== Matches ====
25 July 1998 1	Ferencváros	1 – 0	Haladás	Budapest
19:00 CEST	Mátyus 31'	Report		Stadium: Üllői úti stadion Attendance: 9,000; Referee: Attila Hanacsek

1 August 1998 2	III. Kerület	1 – 2	Ferencváros	Budapest
17:00 CEST	Gáspár 39'	Report	Selimi 26'; Vámosi 70'	Stadium: Hévízi úti stadion Attendance: 12,000; Referee: Sándor Piller

7 August 1998 3	Ferencváros	2 – 2	MTK Budapest	Budapest
20:30 CEST	Nyilas 74' (pen.); Bükszegi 88'	Report	Kenesei 5'; Halmai 24'	Stadium: Üllői úti stadion Attendance: 9,000; Referee: László Vágner

15 August 1998 4	Gázszer	1 – 1	Ferencváros	Akasztó
19:00 CEST	Szalai 90+1'	Report	Bükszegi 61'	Stadium: Stadler Stadion; Attendance: 10,000; Referee: Sándor Varga

22 August 1998 5	Ferencváros	2 – 0	Siófok	Budapest
17:00 CEST	Vincze 77'; Selimi 88'	Report		Stadium: Üllői úti stadion Attendance: 8,000; Referee: Sándor Piller

29 August 1998 6	BVSC Budapest	0 – 1	Ferencváros	Budapest
19:00 CEST		Report	Bükszegi 56'	Stadium: Szőnyi úti Stadion; Attendance: 5,000; Referee: Ferenc Bede

12 September 1998 7	Ferencváros	2 – 0	Debrecen	Budapest
19:00 CEST	Bükszegi 26'; Schultz 51'	Report		Stadium: Üllői úti stadion Attendance: 9,000; Referee: Géza Kiss

19 September 1998 8	Újpest	2 – 1	Ferencváros	Budapest
19:00 CEST	Tamási 8'; Herczeg 29'	Report	Vincze 59'	Stadium: Megyeri uti Stadium; Attendance: 5,000; Referee: Sándor Puhl

26 September 1998 9	Ferencváros	1 – 1	Győr	Budapest
19:00 CEST	Szabics 55'	Report	Vayer 35'	Stadium: Üllői úti stadion Attendance: no spectators Referee: Sándor Varga

3 October 1998 10	Zalaegerszeg	1 – 1	Ferencváros	Zalaegerszeg
18:00 CEST	Ferenczi 49'	Report	Kovács 14'	Stadium: ZTE Arena; Attendance: 18,000; Referee: László Vágner

17 October 1998 11	Ferencváros	2 – 2	Vác	Budapest
18:00 CEST	Mátyus 52'; Szabics 73'	Report	Horváth 28'; Nagy 63' (pen.)	Stadium: Üllői úti stadion Attendance: 7,500; Referee: Béla Kiss

24 October 1998 12	Ferencváros	3 – 4	Diósgyőr	Budapest
18:00 CEST	Szabics 20', 69'; Bükszegi 74'	Report	Kulcsár 9', 18'; Egressy 73'; Szabó 84'	Stadium: Üllői úti stadion Attendance: 10,246; Referee: Attila Ábrahám

31 October 1998 13	Videoton	1 – 3	Ferencváros	Székesfehérvár
17:00 CET	Đurišić 75'	Report	Fülöp 14', 67'; Füzi 85'	Stadium: Sóstói stadion Attendance: 8,000; Referee: János Makai

7 November 1998 14	Ferencváros	2 – 1	Nyíregyháza	Budapest
17:00 CET	Szabics 10', 59'	Report	Szatke 41'	Stadium: Üllői úti stadion Attendance: 8,000; Referee: Zsolt Szabó

14 November 1998 15	Dunaferr	2 – 1	Ferencváros	Dunaújváros
13:00 CET	Nichenko 58', 89'	Report	Mátyus 90+1'	Stadium: Dunaferr Arena; Attendance: 13,000; Referee: Sándor Puhl

21 November 1998 16	Ferencváros	3 – 1	Vasas	Budapest
17:00 CET	Selimi 26', 58'; Vincze 51'	Report	Pál	Stadium: Üllői úti stadion Attendance: 7,000; Referee: Ferenc Bede

28 November 1998 17	Kispest	2 – 2	Ferencváros	Budapest
13:00 CET	Borgulya 16', 60'	Report	Vincze 45'; Selimi 57'	Stadium: Bozsik Stadion; Attendance: 5,000; Referee: Zsolt Szabó

21 April 1999 18	Haladás	1 – 2	Ferencváros	Szombathely
19:00 CEST	Jovanović 75'	Report	Lendvai 68'; P. Tóth 86' (o.g.)	Stadium: Rohonci úti stadion Attendance: 8,000; Referee: Attila Ábrahám

6 March 1999 19	Ferencváros	7 – 1	III. Kerület	Budapest
16:30 CET	Szabics 2', 51', 79', 84'; Nyilas 32' (pen.); Vincze 60'; Schultz 90+1'	Report	Lendvai 70'	Stadium: Üllői úti stadion Attendance: 7,300; Referee: Attila Hajdó

13 March 1999 20	MTK Budapest	2 – 0	Ferencváros	Budapest
16:30 CET	Kenesei 41'; Madar 82'	Report		Stadium: Hungária körúti stadion Attendance: 5,000; Referee: Attila Hanacsek

20 March 1999 21	Ferencváros	2 – 0	Gázszer	Budapest
19:00 CET	Bócz 66'; Szabics 76'	Report		Stadium: Üllői úti stadion Attendance: 7,000; Referee: Sándor Piller

3 April 1999 22	Siófok	0 – 2	Ferencváros	Siófok
16:30 CEST		Report	Nyilas 69' (pen.); Füzi 88'	Stadium: Révész Géza utcai Stadion; Attendance: 8,000; Referee: Attila Juhos

7 April 1999 23	Ferencváros	1 – 0	BVSC Budapest	Budapest
19:00 CEST	Vámosi 40'	Report		Stadium: Üllői úti stadion Attendance: 6,493; Referee: Tamás Arany

10 April 1999 24	Debrecen	6 – 1	Ferencváros	Debrecen
16:30 CEST	Sabo 7', 44', 47'; Ilea 68', 83' (pen.); Bodnár 90+2'	Report	Nagy 64'	Stadium: Oláh Gábor utcai Stadion; Attendance: 7,500; Referee: Ferenc Bede

17 April 1999 25	Ferencváros	1 – 0	Újpest	Budapest
16:30 CEST	Mátyus 65'	Report		Stadium: Üllői úti stadion Attendance: 9,868; Referee: Sándor Piller

24 April 1999 26	Győr	1 – 2	Ferencváros	Győr
19:00 CEST	Somogyi 85'	Report	Bükszegi 5'; Jagodics 90+2'	Stadium: ETO Park; Attendance: 20,000; Referee: Zoltán Szarka

1 May 1999 27	Ferencváros	4 – 0	Zalaegerszeg	Budapest
16:30 CEST	Mátyus 42'; Bükszegi 65'; Vincze 80'; Kulcsár 86'	Report		Stadium: Üllői úti stadion Attendance: 6,000; Referee: Attila Juhos

5 May 1999 28	Vác	1 – 1	Ferencváros	Vác
19:00 CEST	Schwarcz 17'	Report	Kulcsár 38'	Stadium: Városi Stadion; Attendance: 6,000; Referee: Géza Kiss

8 May 1999 29	Diósgyőr	1 – 3	Ferencváros	Miskolc
16:30 CEST	Egressy 89'	Report	Bükszegi 9', 72'; Szabics 87'	Stadium: Diósgyőri Stadion; Attendance: 12,000; Referee: Sándor Puhl

16 May 1999 30	Ferencváros	2 – 0	Videoton	Budapest
15:00 CEST	Mátyus 74'; Füzi 86'	Report		Stadium: Üllői úti stadion Attendance: 6,387; Referee: Attila Hajdó

23 May 1999 31	Nyíregyháza	0 – 1	Ferencváros	Nyíregyháza
16:00 CEST		Report	Vincze 14'	Stadium: Városi Stadion; Attendance: 15,000; Referee: Zsolt Szabó

29 May 1999 32	Ferencváros	1 – 3	Dunaferr	Budapest
16:30 CEST	Salamon 16' (o.g.)	Report	Lengyel 7', 47'; Tököli 80'	Stadium: Üllői úti stadion Attendance: 7,000; Referee: Attila Ábrahám

12 June 1999 33	Vasas	2 – 1	Ferencváros	Budapest
17:00 CEST	Mónos 47'; Sowunmi 67'	Report	Kovács 34'	Stadium: Illovszky Rudolf Stadion; Attendance: 6,000; Referee: Tamás Arany

16 June 1999 34	Ferencváros	0 – 1	Kispest	Budapest
17:00 CEST		Report	Borgulya 84'	Stadium: Üllői úti stadion Attendance: 6,277; Referee: Attila Juhos

=== Hungarian Cup ===
28 October 1998 Round of 32	III. Kerület	0 – 1	Ferencváros	Budapest
CEST		[ Report]	Szabics 49'	Stadium: Hévízi úti stadion Attendance: 4,000; Referee: Ferenc Hosszú

25 November 1998 Round of 16	Újpest	3 – 1	Ferencváros	Budapest
CET	Sebők 27' (pen.); Tamási 66'; Kovács 71'	[ Report]	Selimi 3'	Stadium: Megyeri uti Stadium; Attendance: 5,000; Referee: Sándor Piller

=== UEFA Cup ===
==== First qualifying round ====
22 July 1998 Q1 Leg 1	Ferencváros	6 – 0	(Andorra) Principat	Budapest, Hungary
CEST	Fülöp 25'; Selimi 42'; Schultz 48', 75' (pen.); Vámosi 63'; Mátyus 90'	Report		Stadium: Üllői úti stadion Attendance: 6,000; Referee: (Estonia) Sten Kaldma

29 July 1998 Q1 Leg 2	(Andorra) Principat	1 – 8 (1 – 14 agg.)	Ferencváros	Andorra la Vella, Andorra
CEST	Pasqui 24'	Report	Selimi 18', 74'; Kovács 23', 83'; Kriston 51'; Nagy 52'; Jagodics 58'; Schultz 84'	Attendance: 1,200; Referee: (San Marino) Busugnani

==== Second qualifying round ====
11 August 1998 Q2 Leg 1	Ferencváros	4 – 2	(Greece) AEK Athens	Budapest, Hungary
CEST	Selimi 11'; Lendvai 28'; Nyilas 54' (pen.); Vincze 83'	Report	Nikolaidis 86'; Sebwe 88'	Stadium: Üllői úti stadion Attendance: 10,000; Referee: (England) David Elleray

25 August 1998 Q2 Leg 2	(Greece) AEK Athens	4 – 0 (6 – 4 agg.)	Ferencváros	Athens, Greece
CEST	Nikolaidis 8', 13' (pen.), 26' (pen.); Donis 63'	Report		Stadium: Nikos Goumas Stadium; Attendance: 32,000; Referee: (Russia) Nikolai Levnikov

== Statistics ==
=== Appearances and goals ===
Last updated on 16 June 1999.

No.	Pos	Nat	Player	Total		PNB		Hungarian Cup		UEFA Cup	
No.	Pos	Nat	Player	Apps	Goals	Apps	Goals	Apps	Goals	Apps	Goals
1	GK	(Hungary) HUN	Milán Udvarácz	26	-33	22	-27	1	0	3	-6
2	DF	(Hungary) HUN	Tibor Simon	5	0	4	0	0	0	1	0
3	DF	(Hungary) HUN	András Telek	39	0	33	0	2	0	4	0
4	MF	(Hungary) HUN	Norbert Nagy	21	2	17	1	1	0	3	1
5	DF	(Hungary) HUN	Mihály Szűcs	26	0	21	0	1	0	4	0
6	DF	(Hungary) HUN	Pál Lilik	4	0	3	0	0	0	1	0
7	MF	(Hungary) HUN	Attila Kriston	18	1	16	0	0	0	2	1
8	MF	(Hungary) HUN	Elek Nyilas	38	4	33	3	2	0	3	1
9	FW	(Albania) ALB	Zenun Selimi	23	10	18	5	1	1	4	4
10	MF	(Hungary) HUN	Levente Schultz	23	5	19	2	2	0	2	3
11	FW	(Hungary) HUN	Zoltán Fülöp	12	3	8	2	1	0	3	1
12	MF	(Hungary) HUN	Miklós Lendvai	34	2	29	1	2	0	3	1
13	DF	(Hungary) HUN	Csaba Vámosi	33	3	27	2	2	0	4	1
14	MF	(Hungary) HUN	Ákos Füzi	31	3	28	3	1	0	2	0
15	FW	(Hungary) HUN	Sándor Kulcsár	17	2	17	2	0	0	0	0
16	FW	(Hungary) HUN	Dénes Eszenyi	9	0	9	0	0	0	0	0
17	DF	(Hungary) HUN	János Mátyus	33	7	28	6	2	0	3	1
18	DF	(Hungary) HUN	Zoltán Jagodics	19	2	16	1	0	0	3	1
19	MF	(Croatia) CRO	Alen Bjelić	3	0	3	0	0	0	0	0
20	DF	(Hungary) HUN	Béla Kovács	30	4	24	2	2	0	4	2
21	MF	(Hungary) HUN	Ottó Vincze	32	8	28	7	2	0	2	1
22	GK	(Hungary) HUN	János Vámos	14	-16	12	-12	1	-3	1	-1
23	MF	(Hungary) HUN	Zoltán Bükszegi	22	9	19	9	1	0	2	0
24	FW	(Hungary) HUN	Imre Szabics	26	13	24	12	2	1	0	0
25	FW	(Hungary) HUN	Tibor Fodor	3	0	3	0	0	0	0	0
26	MF	(Hungary) HUN	Tamás Bócz	6	1	6	1	0	0	0	0
Players no longer at the club:
15	DF	(Hungary) HUN	Tibor Baranyai	1	0	0	0	0	0	1	0

=== Top scorers ===
Includes all competitive matches. The list is sorted by shirt number when total goals are equal.

Last updated on 16 June 1999.

Position	Nation	Number	Name	PNB	Hungarian Cup	UEFA Cup	Total
1	(Hungary)	24	Imre Szabics	12	1	0	13
2	(Albania)	11	Zenun Selimi	5	1	4	10
3	(Hungary)	23	Zoltán Bükszegi	9	0	0	9
4	(Hungary)	21	Ottó Vincze	7	0	1	8
5	(Hungary)	17	János Mátyus	6	0	1	7
6	(Hungary)	10	Levente Schultz	2	0	3	5
7	(Hungary)	20	Béla Kovács	2	0	2	4
8	(Hungary)	8	Elek Nyilas	3	0	1	4
9	(Hungary)	11	Zoltán Fülöp	2	0	1	3
10	(Hungary)	13	Csaba Vámosi	2	0	1	3
11	(Hungary)	14	Ákos Füzi	3	0	0	3
12	(Hungary)	12	Miklós Lendvai	1	0	1	2
13	(Hungary)	4	Norbert Nagy	1	0	1	2
14	(Hungary)	18	Zoltán Jagodics	1	0	1	2
15	(Hungary)	15	Sándor Kulcsár	2	0	0	2
16	(Hungary)	7	Attila Kriston	0	0	1	1
17	(Hungary)	26	Tamás Bócz	1	0	0	1
/	/	/	Own Goals	2	0	0	2
			TOTALS	61	2	18	81

=== Disciplinary record ===
Includes all competitive matches. Players with 1 card or more included only.

Last updated on 16 June 1999.

Position	Nation	Number	Name	PNB		Hungarian Cup		UEFA Cup		Total (Hu Total)	
Position	Nation	Number	Name	Booked	Sent off (straight red)	Booked	Sent off (straight red)	Booked	Sent off (straight red)	Booked	Sent off (straight red)
GK	(Hungary)	1	Milán Udvarácz	2	0	0	0	2	0	4 (2)	0 (0)
DF	(Hungary)	2	Tibor Simon	2	0	0	0	0	0	2 (2)	0 (0)
DF	(Hungary)	3	András Telek	0	0	1	0	2	0	3 (0)	0 (0)
MF	(Hungary)	4	Norbert Nagy	5	0	0	0	0	0	5 (5)	0 (0)
DF	(Hungary)	5	Mihály Szűcs	3	0	0	0	1	0	4 (3)	0 (0)
MF	(Hungary)	7	Attila Kriston	2	0	0	0	0	0	2 (2)	0 (0)
MF	(Hungary)	8	Elek Nyilas	2	0	1	0	1	0	4 (2)	0 (0)
FW	(Albania)	9	Zenun Selimi	1	0	0	0	0	0	1 (1)	0 (0)
MF	(Hungary)	10	Levente Schultz	2	0	0	0	0	0	2 (2)	0 (0)
FW	(Hungary)	11	Zoltán Fülöp	1	0	0	0	0	0	1 (1)	0 (0)
MF	(Hungary)	12	Miklós Lendvai	10	0	0	0	0	0	10 (10)	0 (0)
DF	(Hungary)	13	Csaba Vámosi	7	1	0	0	2	0	9 (7)	1 (1)
DF	(Hungary)	17	János Mátyus	5	1	1	0	0	0	6 (5)	1 (1)
DF	(Hungary)	18	Zoltán Jagodics	2	2	0	0	0	0	2 (2)	2 (2)
MF	(Hungary)	20	Béla Kovács	1	0	0	0	0	0	1 (1)	0 (0)
MF	(Hungary)	21	Ottó Vincze	4	2	0	0	0	0	4 (4)	2 (2)
MF	(Hungary)	23	Zoltán Bükszegi	3	0	0	0	0	0	3 (3)	0 (0)
FW	(Hungary)	24	Imre Szabics	1	0	1	0	0	0	2 (1)	0 (0)
			TOTALS	53	6	4	0	8	0	65 (53)	6 (6)

=== Overall ===
Games played	40 (34 PNB, 2 Hungarian Cup and 4 UEFA Cup)
Games won	23 (19 PNB, 1 Hungarian Cup and 3 UEFA Cup)
Games drawn	7 (7 PNB, 0 Hungarian Cup and 0 UEFA Cup)
Games lost	10 (8 PNB, 1 Hungarian Cup and 1 UEFA Cup)
Goals scored	81
Goals conceded	50
Goal difference	+31
Yellow cards	65
Red cards	6
Worst discipline	(Hungary) Csaba Vámosi (9 (yellow card) , 1 (red card) )
Best result	8–1 (H) v CE Principat - (UEFA Cup) - 29-7-1998
Worst result	1–6 (A) v Debrecen - (PNB) - 10-4-1999
Most appearances	(Hungary) András Telek (40 appearances)
Top scorer	(Hungary) Imre Szabics (13 goals)
Points	76/120 (63.33%)

Last updated: 16 June 1999
