= List of Ferencvárosi TC records and statistics =

Ferencvárosi Torna Club is a Hungarian professional association football club, based in Budapest, Hungary.

== Honours ==
- Hungarian League
  - Winners (31) ^{12}: 1903, 1905, 1906–07, 1908–09, 1909–10, 1910–11, 1911–12, 1912–13, 1925–26, 1926–27, 1927–28, 1931–32, 1933–34, 1937–38, 1939–40, 1940–41, 1948–49, 1962–63, 1964, 1967, 1968, 1975–76, 1980–81, 1991–92, 1994–95, 1995–96, 2000–01, 2003–04, 2015–16, 2018–19, 2019–20
- Hungarian Cup
  - Winners (23) ^{13}: 1912–13, 1921–22, 1926–27, 1927–28, 1932–33, 1934–35, 1941–42, 1942–43, 1943–44, 1955–58, 1971–72, 1973–74, 1975–76, 1977–78, 1990–91, 1992–93, 1993–94, 1994–95, 2002–03, 2003–04, 2014–15, 2015–16, 2016–17
- Hungarian Super Cup
  - Winners (6): 1993, 1994, 1995, 2004, 2015, 2016
- Hungarian League Cup
  - Winners (2): 2012–13, 2014–15
- Inter-Cities Fairs Cup
  - Winners (1): 1964–65
  - Runners-up (1): 1967–68
- UEFA Cup Winners' Cup
  - Runners-up (1): 1974–75
- Mitropa Cup
  - Winners (2): 1928, 1937
  - Runners-up (4): 1935, 1938, 1939, 1940
- Challenge Cup
  - Winner (1): 1909
  - Runners-up (1): 1911

UEFA Champions League winners 1984–1985

Notes

- Note 12: more than any other Hungarian football club.
- Note 13: more than any other Hungarian football club.

== Players ==
=== Most appearances ===
No.	Name	Years	Total
1.	(Hungary) Péter Lipcsei	1990–13	555
2.	(Hungary) György Sárosi	1931–48	450
3.	(Hungary) Flórián Albert	1958–75	433

=== Top scorers ===
Season	Player	Goals
1904	(Hungary) József Pokornyi	16
1907–08	(Hungary) Imre Schlosser	21
1908–09	(Hungary) Imre Schlosser	30
1909–10	(Hungary) Imre Schlosser	18
1910–11	(Hungary) Imre Schlosser	38
1911–12	(Hungary) Imre Schlosser	34
1912–13	(Hungary) Imre Schlosser	33
1913–14	(Hungary) Imre Schlosser	21
1927–28	(Hungary) József Takács	31
1928–29	(Hungary) József Takács	41
1929–30	(Hungary) József Takács	40
1931–32	(Hungary) József Takács	42
1933–34	(Hungary) Géza Toldi	27
1935–36	(Hungary) György Sárosi	37
1939–40	(Hungary) György Sárosi	23
1940–41	(Hungary) György Sárosi	29
1944	(Hungary) György Sárosi	13
1948–49	(Hungary) Ferenc Deák	59
1957–58	(Hungary) Zoltán Friedmanszky ^{22}	16
1959–60	(Hungary) Flórián Albert	27
1960–61	(Hungary) Flórián Albert ^{22}	21
1965	(Hungary) Flórián Albert	27
1980–81	(Hungary) Tibor Nyilasi	30
1989–90	(Hungary) József Dzurják	18
1995–96	(Ukraine) Ihor Nichenko ^{23}	18
2008–09	(Hungary) István Ferenczi ^{24}	39
2015–16	(Hungary) Dániel Böde	17
2018–19	(Italy) Davide Lanzafame	16
2023–24	(Hungary) Barnabás Varga	20

Notes

- Note 22: co-top scorer of the Hungarian League.
- Note 23: also played for Stadler FC.
- Note 24: in the Hungarian League 2.

=== Award winners ===
Ballon d'Or

The following players have won the Ballon d'Or while playing for Ferencvárosi TC:

- (Hungary) Flórián Albert – 1967

== Transfer records ==
=== Record departures ===
	Player	To	Fee	Year
1.	(Hungary) Alex Tóth	(England) AFC Bournemouth	€ 10,400,000	2025-26
2.	(Hungary) Krisztián Lisztes	(Germany) Eintracht Frankfurt	€6,000,000	2024-25
3.	(Albania) Myrto Uzuni	(Spain) Granada CF	€5,100,000	2021-22
4.	(Bosnia and Herzegovina) Muhamed Bešić	(England) Everton	€5,050,000	2014
5.	(Brazil) Somália	(France) Toulouse	€2,400,000	2015
6.	(Hungary) Zoltán Gera	(England) West Bromwich Albion	€2,250,000	2004

=== Record arrivals ===
	Player	From	Fee	Year
1.	(Brazil) Marquinhos	(Brazil) Atlético Mineiro	€1.500,000	2022
2.	(Ecuador) Cristian Ramírez	(Germany) Fortuna Düsseldorf	€360,000	2015
3.	(Hungary) Predrag Bošnjak	(Hungary) Szombathelyi Haladás	€300,000	2014

== Managerial records ==
- Longest-serving manager: Tibor Nyilasi 4 years

== Team records ==
=== First Matches ===
- First Nemzeti Bajnokság I match: Ferencvárosi TC 3-5 Műegyetemi AFC, 1901 Nemzeti Bajnokság I, 21 April 1901

=== Biggest wins ===
==== Magyar Kupa ====
- Biggest win: Szekszárdi UFC 0-10 Ferencváros (29 October 2013) (2013–14 Magyar Kupa)
- Biggest win: Nagyecsed 0–10 Ferencváros (14 October 2014) (2015–16 Magyar Kupa)

==== European Cup ====
- Biggest win: Ferencváros 9–0 Keflavík ÍF (Iceland) (8 September 1965) (1965–66 European Cup)

==== Cup Winners' Cup ====
- Biggest win: Ferencváros 6–0 Floriana F.C. (Malta) (27 September 1972) (1972–73 UEFA Cup Winners' Cup)

==== UEFA Cup ====
- Biggest win: Ferencváros 6–0 Panionios F.C. (Greece) (20 October 1971) (1971–72 UEFA Cup)

=== Goals ===
- Most league goals scored in a season: 140 – 1940–41 Nemzeti Bajnokság I

=== Attendances ===
- highest league average attendance - 48 846 in 1959/60 season
- highest league home game attendance - 85 000 20 July 1958 against MTK on Népstadion.
