= Ferenc Szabó (footballer, born 1921) =

Association football player (b. 1921)

Ferenc Szabó (28 February 1921 in Alsóújlak, Hungary – 12 March 2009 in Budapest) was a Hungarian football player who played as a defender and striker for Ferencváros TC.

== Football career ==
=== Club career ===
Between 1946 and 1952, he played a total of 199 games for Ferencváros TC (144 league games, 37 international, 18 domestic matches) and scored 49 goals (25 league, 24 other). In the 1948-49 season, he was a member of the championship team.

=== International career ===
In 1948, he once was featured on the Hungary national team.

== Honours ==
- Magyar bajnokság
  - bajnok: 1948–49
  - 2.: 1949–50
  - 3.: 1947–48

== Statistics ==
=== Matches for the national team ===
- Albania 0–0 Hungary, 23 May 1948
