= András Telek =

Hungarian footballer

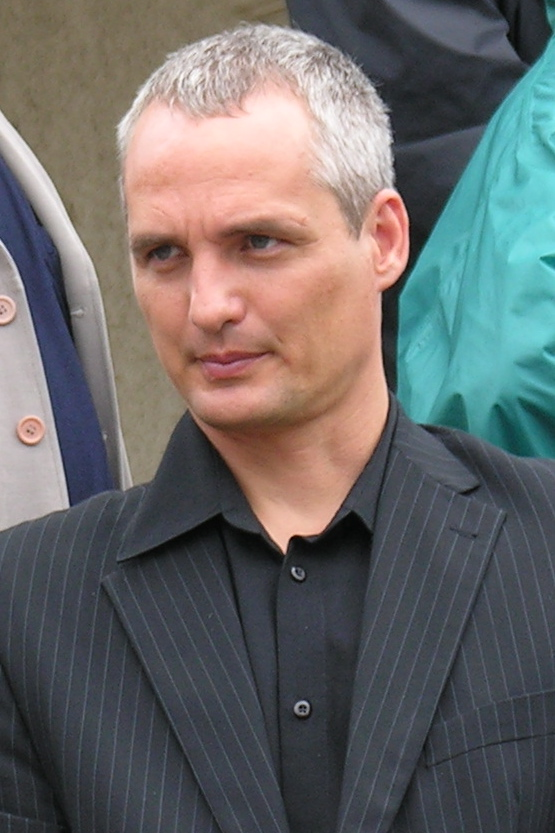
- Telek András in 2011.

Personal information
- Date of birth: 10 December 1970 (age 55)
- Place of birth: Budapest
- Position: Defender

Youth career
- –1989: Ferencvárosi TC

Senior career*
Years	Team	Apps	(Gls)
1989–1996	Ferencvárosi TC		
1997–1998	1. FC Košice		
1998–1999	Ferencvárosi TC		
1999	Dunakeszi VSE		
2000	Jilin Aodong		
2001–2002	Zalaegerszegi TE		

International career
1992–1996	Hungary	24	(0)

Managerial career
- 2005–2006: Hungary (women)
- * Club domestic league appearances and goals

András Telek (born 10 December 1970) is a retired Hungarian football defender. Besides Hungary, he has played in China.
