= Miklós Lendvai =

Hungarian footballer (1975–2023)

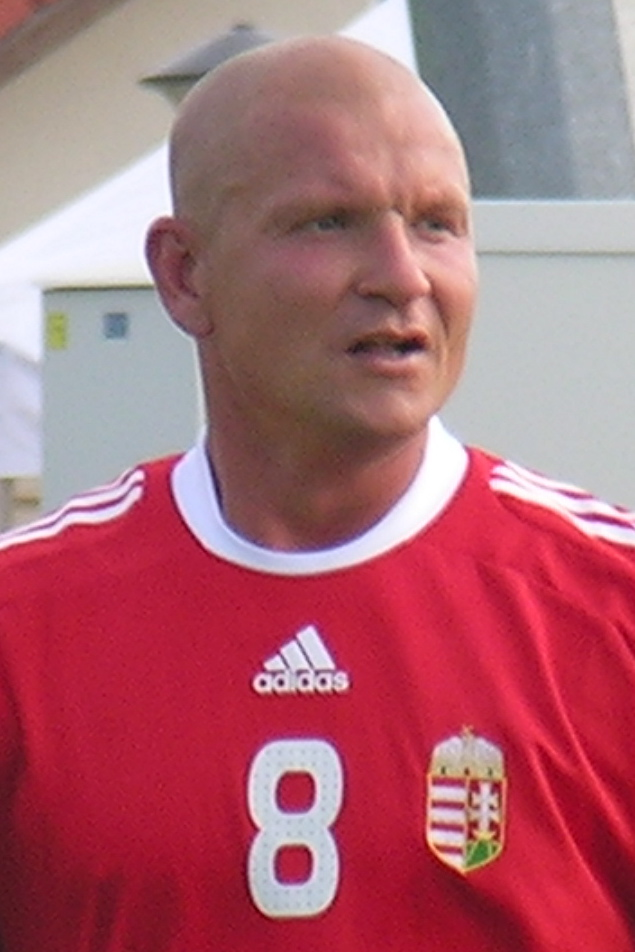
- Lendvai in 2011

Personal information
- Date of birth: 7 April 1975
- Place of birth: Zalaegerszeg, Hungary
- Date of death: 20 February 2023 (aged 47)
- Height: 1.79 m (5 ft 10 in)
- Position: Defensive midfielder

Senior career*
Years	Team	Apps	(Gls)
1991–1996	Zalaegerszeg	54	(3)
1996–1997	Bordeaux	4	(0)
1997–1998	Lugano	0	(0)
1998–1999	Ferencváros	29	(1)
1999–2000	Geel	30	(1)
2000	K.F.C. Germinal Beerschot	31	(0)
2001	Videoton FC Fehérvár	2	(0)
2001–2004	Charleroi	34	(0)
2004	Aris Limassol	7	(2)
2005	Győri ETO FC	26	(0)
2006–2007	Zalaegerszeg	20	(0)
Total		237	(7)

International career
1996–2004	Hungary	23	(0)

Managerial career
- 2007–2008: Andráshida SC
- 2013–2014: Zalaegerszeg
- 2014–2015: Zalaegerszeg
- 2015–2016: Hévíz FC
- * Club domestic league appearances and goals

Miklós Lendvai (7 April 1975 – 20 February 2023) was a Hungarian professional footballer who played as a defensive midfielder.

== Playing career ==
Lendvai played for several Nemzeti Bajnokság I clubs such as Zalaegerszegi, Ferencváros, and Győri ETO FC. He also played for the French side Bordeaux and the Swiss side FC Lugano. He spent several years in Belgium playing for K.F.C. Verbroedering Geel, K.F.C. Germinal Beerschot and R. Charleroi S.C. He also played in Cyprus for Aris Limassol. Finally, he returned to Hungary and played for clubs in lower divisions.

== Managerial career ==
Lendvai managed Andráshida SC, Zalaegerszegi TE, and Hévíz FC.

In 2014, he was appointed as the manager of Zalaegerszeg, after the resignation of Emil Lőrincz. On 5 April 2015, he criticized heavily his own players after losing a Nemzeti Bajnokság II match against Siófok.

In 2016, he resigned as the manager of Hévíz, although he won the Megyei Bajnokság I with the club.

== Personal life and death ==
Lendvai was married and had five children.

In 2018, it was revealed that he ended his managerial career and that he was working as a construction worker. In 2021, it was reported by Nemzeti Sport that Lendvai was not interested in football anymore.

Lendvai died on 20 February 2023, at the age of 47. The cause of his death has not been confirmed by the police, but according to press reports, he committed suicide. His former teammate at Ferencváros, Ottó Vincze, said goodbye on his Instagram profile by saying "Why did he do it?" On 24 February 2023, it was revealed that he committed suicide.

On 25 February 2023, Ricardo Moniz, manager of Zalaegerszeg, paid tribute to Lendvai by beating Fehérvár in the 2022-23 Nemzeti Bajnokság I season.

On 26 February 2023, fans of R. Charleroi S.C. paid tribute to Lendvai with a huge drapery on the 27 matchday of the 2022–23 Belgian Pro League match against Sint-Truidense V.V.
