= Gábor Kubatov =

Hungarian politician (born 1966)

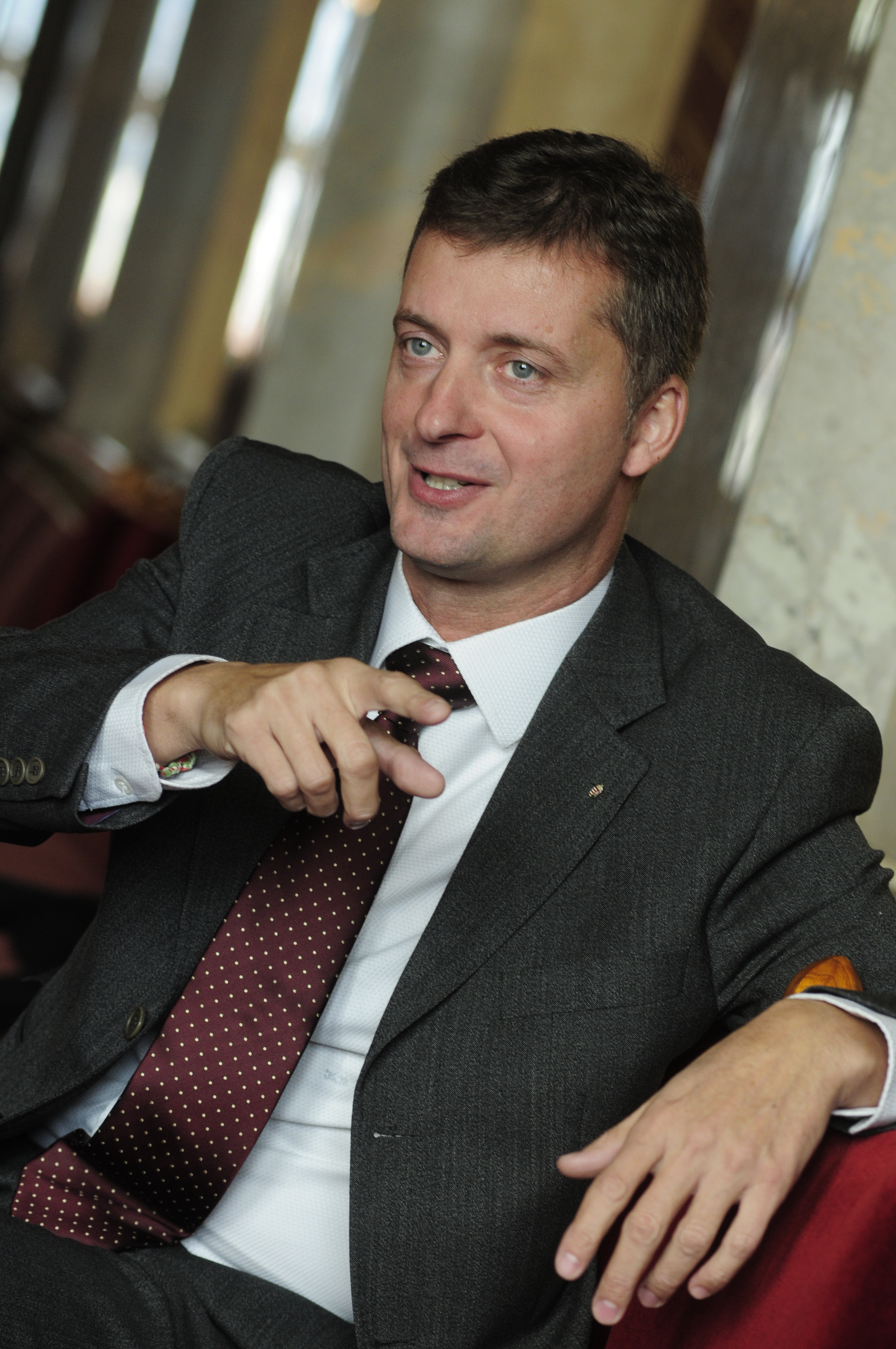

Member of the National Assembly
- In office 16 May 2006 – 8 May 2026

Personal details
- Born: 17 February 1966 (age 60) Budapest, Hungary
- Party: Fidesz (since 2002)
- Spouse: Ágnes Kubatov
- Children: Emma; Marcell; Olívia
- Profession: entrepreneur, politician

Gábor Kubatov (born 17 February 1966) is a Hungarian politician, member of the National Assembly (MP) from Fidesz Budapest Regional List from 2006 to 2014, and his party's national list from 2014 to 2026.

== Career ==
He attended to secondary school in Pesterzsébet. He started studies at the Gödöllő University of Agricultural Sciences, but never finished it. From the 1990s he worked as an entrepreneur. He worked in the fields of hospitality, commerce and inhabitants service. He moved to Soroksár with his family in 1997.

He has been chairman of the District XXIII of Budapest Fidesz branch since 2002. He has been party director of Fidesz since 1 July 2006. In the parliamentary elections held in 2006, he was elected from the Budapest Regional List. He was member of the Committee on Culture and the Media since 9 October 2006 to 13 May 2010. He also secured a mandate from the party's Budapest Regional List during the 2010 parliamentary election. He was a member of the Committee on Human Rights, Minority, Civic and Religious Affairs from 30 May 2006 to 5 May 2014.

Kubatov served as campaign executive of the party during the Hungarian fees abolishment referendum in 2008 and the 2009 European Parliament election in Hungary. He is the current President of the Ferencvárosi TC. He was elected one of the four vice-presidents of the Fidesz on 13 December 2015.

== Controversies ==
- Kubatov was one of the most passive MPs in the National Assembly since 2006. During his parliamentary career, he gave a speech only once, on 3 April 2007.
- In two audio recordings (disclosed in 2010) and in a video (disclosed in 2012) Kubatov speaks about creating and managing a list containing data on the party preference of voters. Fidesz allegedly uses this list to activate its voters. Additionally, in the video Kubatov instructs Fidesz-activists to break the campaign silence period to send lazy sympathizers to vote.
