= Levente Schultz =

Hungarian footballer

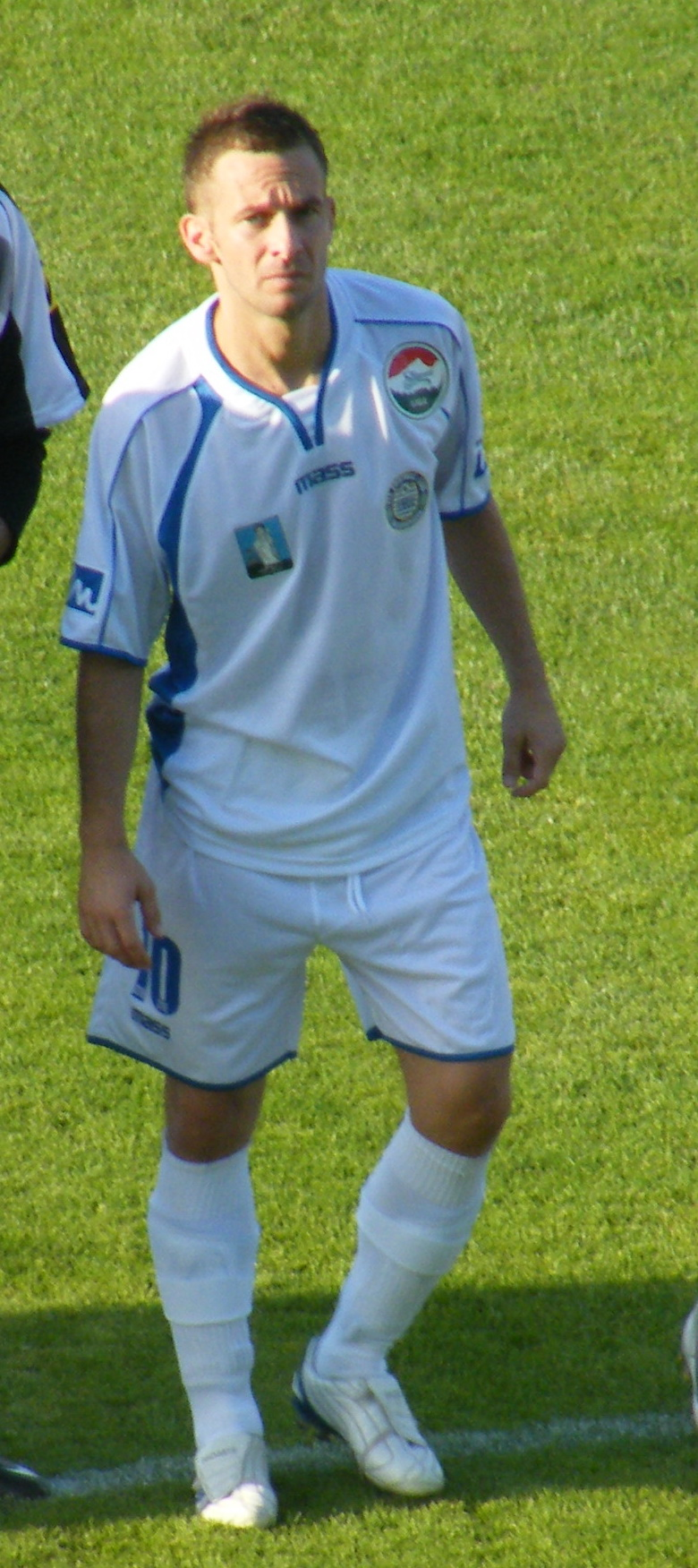

Personal information
- Date of birth: 22 March 1977 (age 49)
- Place of birth: Szeged, Hungary
- Height: 1.74 m (5 ft 9 in)
- Position: Midfielder

Team information
- Current team: SV Rohrbach

Youth career
- Ferencvárosi TC

Senior career*
Years	Team	Apps	(Gls)
1995–2001	Ferencvárosi TC	74	(4)
1996	→ Békéscsaba (loan)	5	(1)
2000	→ Lombard-Pápa TFC (loan)	?	(?)
2001–2003	BFC Siófok	27	(4)
2003–2005	Vasas SC	21	(1)
2005	Budapest Honvéd FC	3	(0)
2005–2006	Budakalász MSE	12	(1)
2006–2007	SV St. Margarethen	31	(3)
2007–2009	SV Wacker Burghausen	50	(3)
2009–2010	Zalaegerszegi TE	13	(0)
2010–2011	Pécsi MFC	14	(0)
2012–	SV Rohrbach	?	(?)

International career
1995–1996	Hungary U-17	3	(0)
1996–2000	Hungary U-21	7	(0)
- * Club domestic league appearances and goals as of 13 August 2011

Levente Schultz (born 22 March 1977) is a Hungarian footballer. He was born in Szeged.
