= Zenun Selimi =

Kosovan football manager

Personal information
- Date of birth: 21 November 1971 (age 54)
- Place of birth: Kosovo
- Height: 1.85 m (6 ft 1 in)
- Position: Winger

Senior career*
Years	Team	Apps	(Gls)
1997–1998	FC Zug	3	(0)
1998–1999	Ferencváros	24	(10)
1999–2000	Young Boys	13	(6)
2000–2001	FC Luzern	28	(4)
2001–2002	Lokomotiv Sofia	23	(5)
2002–2003	Delémont	30	(8)
2003–2005	Tuggen	6	(5)
2007–2008	Schötz	34	(21)
2009–2010	Emmenbrücke	29	(13)

International career
2002	Kosovo	1	(0)

Managerial career
- 2010-2011: FC Wangen bei Olten
- 2011–2012: Schattdorf
- 2013–2016: Kickers Luzern
- 2020-: SC Buochs
- * Club domestic league appearances and goals

Zenun Selimi (born 21 November 1971) is a Kosovan football manager and former player who played as a winger.

== Career ==
In 1998, Selimi signed for Ferencváros, Hungary's most successful club, before joining Young Boys in the Swiss second division.

In 2001, he signed for Bulgarian side Lokomotiv Sofia.

In 2002, he signed for Delémont in the Swiss top flight, before joining Swiss lower league team Tuggen.

== International career ==
He played on 7 September 2002 for Kosovo, the first time after the Kosovo War that the team played a friendly match against Albania and the match ended with a 0–1.
