= Attila Hajdu =

Hungarian footballer

Personal information
- Date of birth: 13 April 1971 (age 55)
- Place of birth: Budapest, Hungary
- Height: 1.86 m (6 ft 1 in)
- Position: Goalkeeper

Youth career
- 1979–1991: Ferencvárosi TC

Senior career*
Years	Team	Apps	(Gls)
1991–1993	Váci FC	1	(0)
1993	Szegedi LC	0	(0)
1993–1995	SC Csepel	55	(0)
1995–1998	Ferencvárosi TC	47	(0)
1998–2000	SC Fortuna Köln	11	(0)
2000–2001	Vasas SC	16	(0)
2001–2003	MTK Hungária	63	(0)
2003–2004	FC Sopron	8	(0)

International career
1994–1998	Hungary	10	(0)
- * Club domestic league appearances and goals

Attila Hajdu (born 13 April 1971) is a Hungarian football player.

He spent most of his career playing for clubs in Hungary, but also had a spell with SC Fortuna Köln in the German 2. Bundesliga.

== Honours ==
Ferencvárosi TC

- Nemzeti Bajnokság I: 1995–96; runners-up: 1997–98

MTK Hungária FC

- Nemzeti Bajnokság I: 2002–03
- Szuperkupa: 2003

Individual

- Goalkeeper of the Year: 1995–96
