= Ákos Füzi =

Hungarian footballer

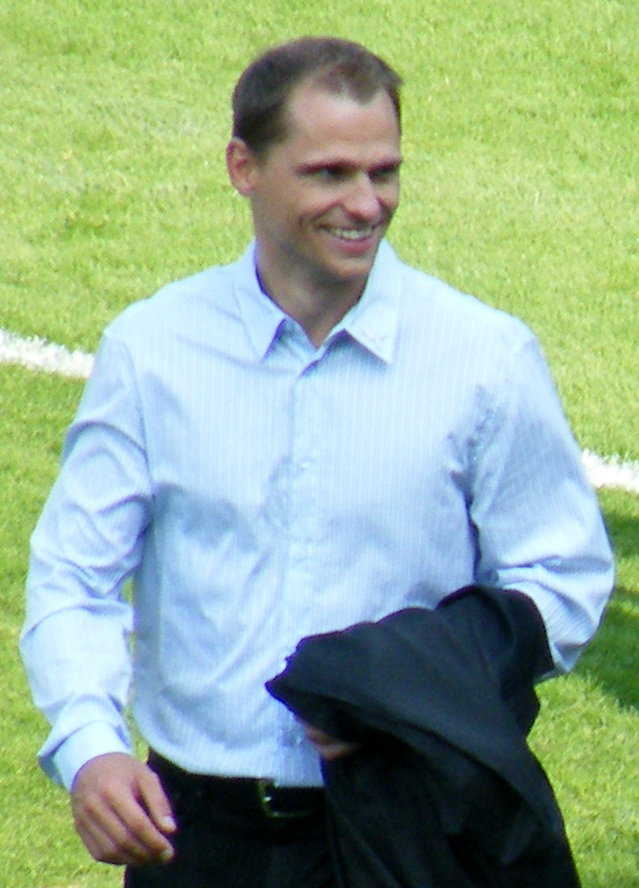
- Füzi in 2009

Personal information
- Date of birth: 24 March 1978 (age 48)
- Place of birth: Hungary
- Height: 1.85 m (6 ft 1 in)
- Position: Left back

Senior career*
Years	Team	Apps	(Gls)
1995–1996	Győri ETO FC	20	(1)
1996–1998	BVSC Budapest	59	(4)
1998–2000	Ferencvárosi TC	54	(3)
2000–2005	MTK Hungária FC	145	(13)
2005	Admira Wacker	4	(0)
2006–2007	Újpest FC	25	(1)
2008	Vasas SC	3	(0)

International career
1996–1997	Hungary U-19	7	(0)
1998–1999	Hungary U-21	5	(0)
1999–2004	Hungary	11	(0)
- * Club domestic league appearances and goals

Ákos Füzi dr. (born 24 March 1978) is a retired Hungarian football player who currently works as a club manager for Újpest FC. He spent most of his career playing for MTK Hungária FC. He made a guest appearance (bending the rules to their fullest extent) to appear for the Budapest team in the 2004 Lawyers World Cup (Mundiavocat) held in Balaton region, Hungary. His involvement proved key, as it was his penalty kick (scored from rebound after initial shot saved) that enabled Budapest to overcome London 1–0 to progress to the tournament final, which they won.

Füzi retired from playing in April 2008.

== Honors ==
- Hungarian League: 2003
- Hungarian Super Cup: 2003
