= Zoltán Bükszegi =

Hungarian footballer

Personal information
- Full name: Zoltán Bükszegi
- Date of birth: 16 December 1975 (age 50)
- Place of birth: Budapest, Hungary
- Height: 1.83 m (6 ft 0 in)
- Position: Striker

Senior career*
Years	Team	Apps	(Gls)
1991–1998	BVSC Budapest	138	(35)
1998–2000	Ferencvárosi TC	26	(9)
2000–2002	MTK Hungaria FC	34	(4)
2002	Vasas SC	12	(5)
2002–2003	Dunaferr FC	25	(2)
2003–2005	Újpest FC	44	(12)
2005–2006	Nea Salamis Famagusta FC	23	(3)
2006–2007	Alki Larnaca	12	(4)
2007–2008	Vasas SC	3	(0)
2008–2010	Víkingur Gøta	24	(5)

International career
1996–1997	Hungary U-21	9	(0)
1996	Hungary U23	2	(0)
1995	Hungary	2	(0)
- * Club domestic league appearances and goals

Zoltán Bükszegi (born 16 December 1975) is a Hungarian football player who last played for Víkingur Gøta.
