= Tibor Simon =

Hungarian player and manager (1965–2002)

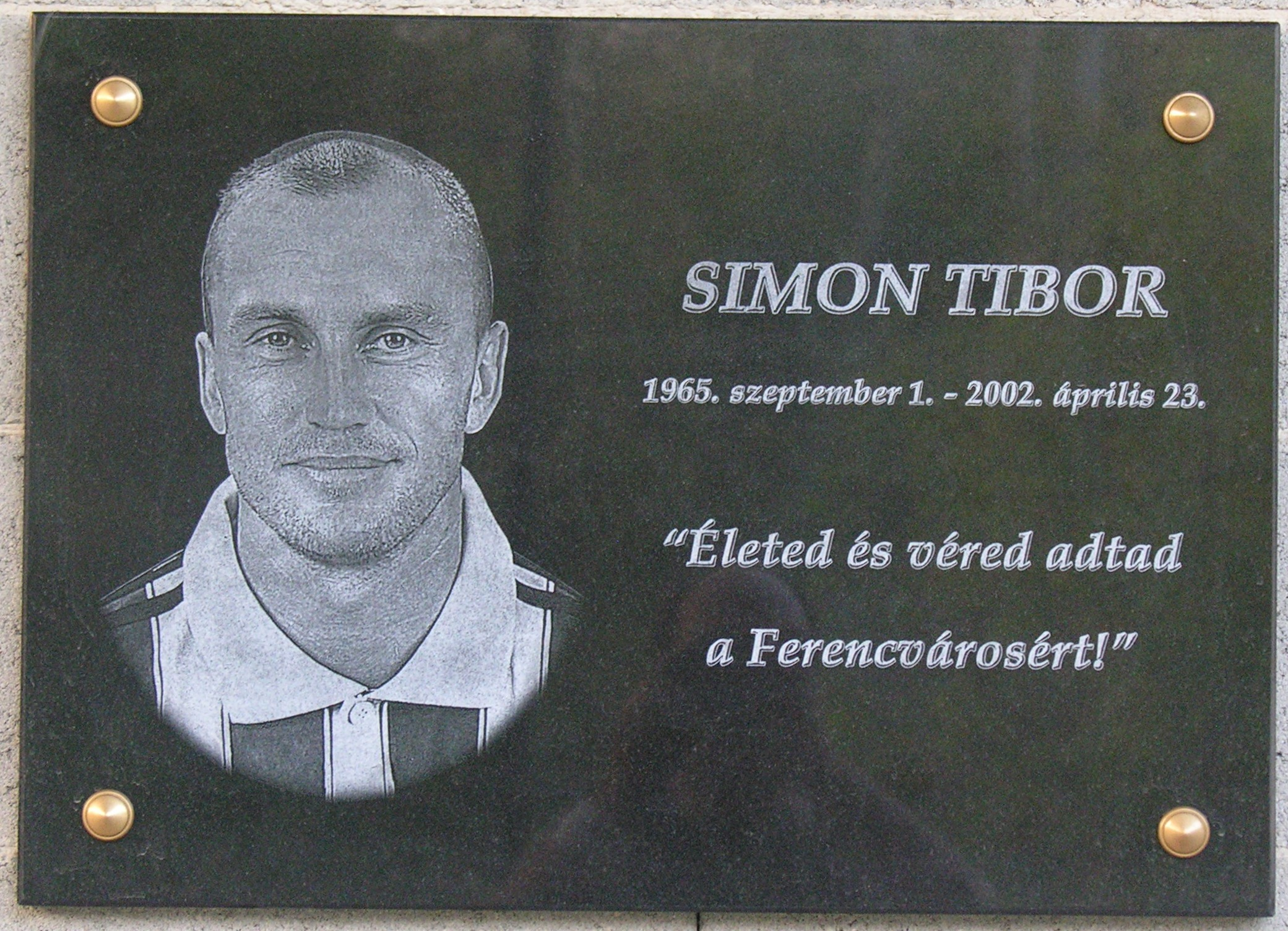
- Commemorative plaque of Tibor Simon in Budapest District IX, Üllői street No 129 (FTC Stadium).

Personal information
- Date of birth: 1 September 1965
- Place of birth: Budapest, Hungary
- Date of death: 23 April 2002 (aged 36)
- Place of death: Budapest, Hungary
- Position: Defender

Senior career*
Years	Team	Apps	(Gls)
1985–1999	Ferencváros	194	(2)
1996–1997	→ BVSC (loan)	10	(0)
1999–2001	BVSC	23	(0)
2001	Rákospalota	2	(0)
Total		229	(2)

International career
1989–1995	Hungary	16	(0)

Managerial career
- 1999–2001: BVSC (player-manager)
- 2001: Rákospalota (player-manager)
- 2001–2002: Sopron
- * Club domestic league appearances and goals

Tibor Simon (1 September 1965 – 23 April 2002) was a Hungarian football player and football manager.

== Career ==
Simon, who played as a defender, spent most of his professional club career with Ferencváros, and also earned 16 caps at international level for Hungary, including three FIFA World Cup qualifying matches.

His managerial career started with managing Nemzeti Bajnokság II side BVSC and Rákospalota as a player-manager. In December 2001, Simon joined Nemzeti Bajnokság I club Sopron.

== Death ==
On 21 April 2002, Simon was beaten by security personnel outside a pub in Budapest, dying two days later. Three of the four men arrested for his murder were later freed.
