= 1904 Nemzeti Bajnokság I =

Annual Hungarian soccer tournament

Nemzeti Bajnokság I
- Season: 1904
- Country: Hungary
- Champions: MTK Budapest FC

Statistics of Nemzeti Bajnokság I for the 1904 season.

== Overview ==
It was contested by 9 teams, and MTK Hungária FC won the championship.

== League standings ==
| Pos | Team | Pld | W | D | L | GF | GA | GR | Pts |
|---|---|---|---|---|---|---|---|---|---|
| 1 | MTK Budapest FC | 16 | 11 | 3 | 2 | 28 | 13 | 2.154 | 25 |
| 2 | Ferencvárosi TC | 16 | 11 | 2 | 3 | 48 | 16 | 3.000 | 24 |
| 3 | Budapesti TC | 16 | 9 | 4 | 3 | 28 | 13 | 2.154 | 22 |
| 4 | Magyar Úszó Egylet | 16 | 6 | 4 | 6 | 21 | 30 | 0.700 | 16 |
| 5 | Budapesti Postás SE | 16 | 6 | 2 | 8 | 17 | 17 | 1.000 | 14 |
| 6 | Magyar AC | 16 | 6 | 2 | 8 | 25 | 27 | 0.926 | 14 |
| 7 | Műegyetemi AFC | 16 | 4 | 5 | 7 | 22 | 23 | 0.957 | 13 |
| 8 | 33 FC | 16 | 4 | 4 | 8 | 20 | 31 | 0.645 | 12 |
| 9 | Fővárosi TC | 16 | 0 | 4 | 12 | 16 | 55 | 0.291 | 4 |

Source: rsssf.com

== Results ==
| Home \ Away | 33F | BTC | FTC | FŐV | MAC | MÚE | MGY | MTK | POS |
|---|---|---|---|---|---|---|---|---|---|
| 33 FC | | 1–3 | 2–1 | 3–1 | 2–2 | 1–1 | 0–1 | 3–5 | 1–0 |
| Budapesti TC | 3–1 | | 2–0 | 3–0 | 2–1 | 6–0 | 1–1 | 1–1 | 1–0 |
| Ferencváros | 5–2 | 2–0 | | 13–0 | 4–1 | 1–0 | 2–0 | 1–1 | 0–2 |
| Fővárosi | 1–1 | 1–1 | 2–5 | | 1–1 | 1–2 | 1–1 | 1–5 | 2–3 |
| Magyar AC | 4–0 | 0–1 | -:+ (Note: The match was settled with a goalless win.) | 3–2 | | 3–1 | 1–8 | 0–1 | 3–1 |
| Magyar ÚE | 2–2 | 1–0 | 1–7 | 5–0 | 2–0 | | 0–0 | 0–6 | 1–1 |
| Műegyetem | 0–1 | 1–1 | 2–2 | 6–3 | 0–3 | 1–4 | | -:+ | 0–3 |
| MTK Budapest | 1–0 | 2–1 | 0–3 | 2–0 | 2–0 | 1–0 | 1–0 | | 0–0 |
| Postások | 1–0 | 1–2 | 1–2 | 1–0 | 0–3 | 0–1 | 0–1 | 3–0 | |

Source: rsssf.com
Legend: Blue = home team win; Yellow = draw; Red = away team win.
