= 1908–09 Nemzeti Bajnokság I =

Nemzeti Bajnokság I
- Season: 1908–09
- Country: Hungary
- Champions: Ferencvárosi TC

Statistics of Nemzeti Bajnokság I for the 1908–09 season.

== Overview ==
It was contested by 9 teams, and Ferencvárosi TC won the championship.

== League standings ==
| Pos | Team | Pld | W | D | L | GF | GA | GR | Pts |
|---|---|---|---|---|---|---|---|---|---|
| 1 | Ferencvárosi TC | 16 | 14 | 0 | 2 | 69 | 21 | 3.286 | 28 |
| 2 | Magyar AC | 16 | 8 | 6 | 2 | 33 | 25 | 1.320 | 22 |
| 3 | Budapesti TC | 16 | 9 | 3 | 4 | 27 | 16 | 1.688 | 21 |
| 4 | MTK Budapest FC | 16 | 9 | 2 | 5 | 43 | 19 | 2.263 | 20 |
| 5 | Fővárosi TC | 16 | 8 | 2 | 6 | 36 | 36 | 1.000 | 18 |
| 6 | Budapesti AK | 16 | 6 | 2 | 8 | 24 | 28 | 0.857 | 14 |
| 7 | Törekvés SE | 16 | 4 | 3 | 9 | 30 | 49 | 0.612 | 11 |
| 8 | Újpest FC | 16 | 3 | 2 | 11 | 19 | 41 | 0.463 | 8 |
| 9 | Typographia | 16 | 0 | 2 | 14 | 13 | 59 | 0.220 | 2 |

Source: rsssf.com

== Results ==
| Home \ Away | BAK | BTC | FTC | FŐV | MAC | MTK | TÖR | TYP | ÚJP |
|---|---|---|---|---|---|---|---|---|---|
| Budapesti AK | | 0–1 | 0–4 | 2–1 | 1–3 | 1–3 | 2–2 | 2–1 | 5–0 |
| Budapesti TC | 2–0 | | 0–3 | 0–3 | 0–0 | 0–1 | 2–2 | 3–0 | 2–1 |
| Ferencváros | 2–1 | 2–4 | | 3–1 | 3–5 | 4–2 | 6–1 | 12–2 | +:- (Note: The match between Ferencváros and Újpest was settled as a goalless win for Ferencváros.) |
| Főváros | 2–1 | 1–2 | 1–11 | | 3–3 | 1–0 | 5–2 | 2–1 | 3–1 |
| Magyar AC | 1–1 | 2–1 | 1–5 | 2–2 | | 1–0 | 2–2 | 4–0 | 1–0 |
| MTK Budapest | 1–2 | 1–1 | 0–1 | 4–3 | 4–0 | | 2–0 | 8–1 | 1–1 |
| Törekvés | 4–3 | 0–6 | 0–5 | 2–3 | 1–2 | 2–3 | | 4–1 | 1–4 |
| Typographia | 1–2 | 0–2 | 1–2 | 0–4 | 1–1 | 0–5 | 2–3 | | 0–3 |
| Újpest | 0–1 | 0–1 | 2–6 | 2–1 | 1–5 | 1–8 | 1–4 | 2–2 | |

Source: rsssf.com
Legend: Blue = home team win; Yellow = draw; Red = away team win.
