= Elek Nyilas =

Hungarian footballer

Personal information
- Full name: Elek Nyilas
- Date of birth: 3 May 1969 (age 57)
- Place of birth: Budapest, Hungary
- Position: Midfielder

Senior career*
Years	Team	Apps	(Gls)
1991–1995	Dunakanyar-Vác FC	101	(13)
1995–1999	Ferencvárosi TC	93	(16)
1998	→ Maccabi Tel Aviv F.C. (loan)	20	(2)
1999–2003	F.C. Ashdod	102	(21)
2003–2004	Győri ETO FC	22	(1)

International career^{‡}
1995–1997	Hungary	14	(2)

Managerial career
- 2013-2015: Szeged FC
- 2015-2017: Tiszakécske FC
- 2017-2023: Tiszakécske FC (Director of football)
- 2023-: Tiszakécske FC (Advisor of Management)
- * Club domestic league appearances and goals ‡ National team caps and goals as of 16 March 2012

Elek Nyilas (born 3 May 1969) is a retired Hungarian football player.

== International career ==
He was member of the Hungary national football team from 1995 to 1997.

=== International goals ===
#	Date	Venue	Opponent	Score	Result	Competition
1.	10 November 1996	Tofiq Bahramov Stadium, Baku, Azerbaijan	Azerbaijan	1–0	3–0	1998 FIFA World Cup qualification
2.	10 November 1996	Tofiq Bahramov Stadium, Baku, Azerbaijan	Azerbaijan	2–0	3–0	1998 FIFA World Cup qualification
