= Zoltán Friedmanszky =

Hungarian footballer (1934–2022)

Personal information
- Date of birth: 22 October 1934
- Place of birth: Ormosbánya, Hungary
- Date of death: 31 March 2022 (aged 87)
- Height: 1.71 m (5 ft 7 in)
- Position: Forward

Senior career*
Years	Team	Apps	(Gls)
1957–1965	Ferencváros	91	(36)

Managerial career
- 1971–1975: FC Matanzas
- 1977–1978: Szolnok
- 1978–1980: Ferencváros
- * Club domestic league appearances and goals

Zoltán Friedmanszky (22 October 1934 – 31 March 2022) was a Hungarian footballer who played as a forward. He was a member of the Hungary national team at the 1958 FIFA World Cup. However, he was never capped for the national team. He also played for Ferencváros.
