= Ottó Vincze =

Hungarian footballer (born 1974)

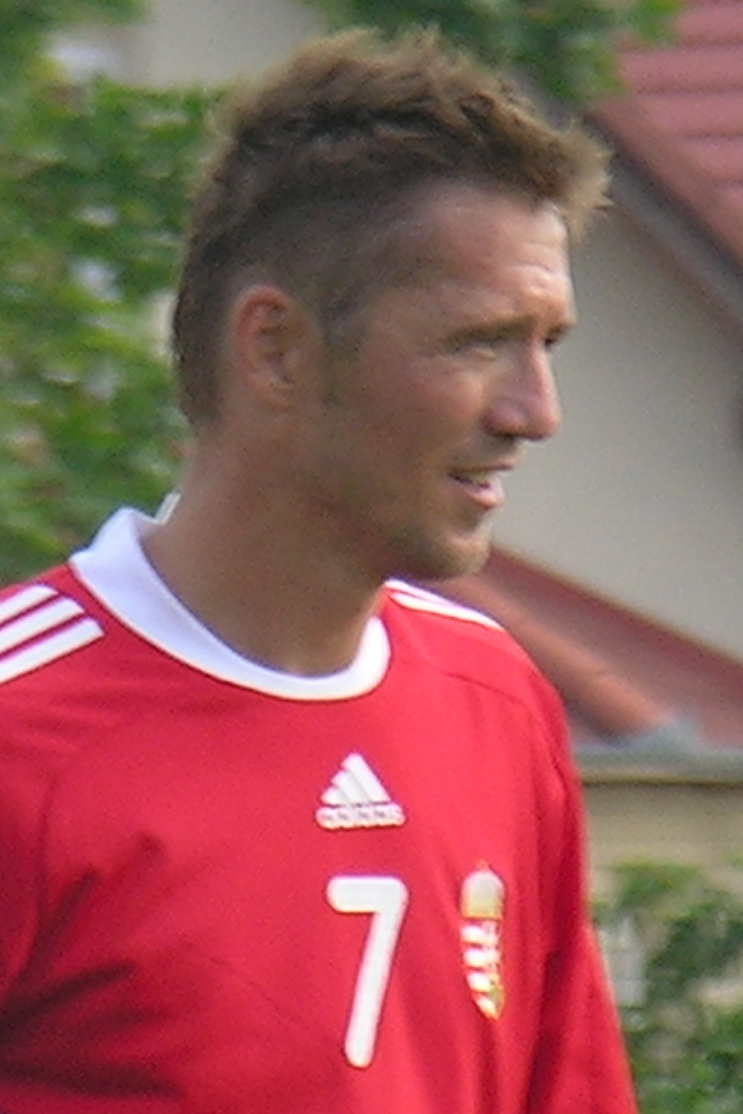
- Vincze in 2011

Personal information
- Date of birth: 29 August 1974 (age 52)
- Place of birth: Ózd, Hungary
- Height: 1.85 m (6 ft 1 in)
- Position: Midfielder

Senior career*
Years	Team	Apps	(Gls)
1992–1993	Sion	1	(0)
1993–1995	Vasas	37	(11)
1995–1996	Ferencváros	17	(2)
1996	Sion	9	(1)
1997	→ Barcelona B (loan)	2	(0)
1997–1999	Ferencváros	60	(19)
1999–2001	Waldhof Mannheim	47	(9)
2001–2002	Energie Cottbus	9	(0)
2002–2004	Zalaegerszeg	45	(6)
2004–2007	Győri	58	(18)
2007–2008	Ferencváros	18	(2)
2008–2009	SV St. Margarethen	40	(11)
Total		343	(79)

International career
1998–2005	Hungary	11	(0)
- * Club domestic league appearances and goals

Ottó Vincze (born 29 August 1974) is a Hungarian former professional footballer who played as a midfielder.

He played abroad in Spain, Switzerland and Germany.

His wife is handball player Anita Görbicz. Their son, Boldizsár, was born in 2015.
