= Ihor Nychenko =

Ukrainian footballer and coach

Personal information
- Full name: Ihor Hryhorovych Nychenko
- Date of birth: 18 April 1971 (age 55)
- Place of birth: Kherson, Ukrainian SSR, Soviet Union
- Height: 1.77 m (5 ft 10 in)
- Position: Forward

Senior career*
Years	Team	Apps	(Gls)
1989	Podillia Khmelnytsky	35	(11)
1990–1992	Metalist Kharkiv	27	(0)
1992	Krystal Kherson	15	(9)
1992–1995	Kryvbas Kryvyi Rih	79	(24)
1995–1996	Stadler FC	22	(16)
1996–1998	Ferencvaros Budapest	66	(32)
1998–2001	Dunaferr Dunaujvaros	84	(25)
2001–2005	Raba ETO Győr	83	(24)
2005	Zakarpattia Uzhhorod	-	
2005–2006	Krystal Kherson	-	

Managerial career
- 2006–2007: Krystal Kherson (assistant)
- 2011–2014: Győri ETO FC (assistant)
- 2015–2016: Jászberényi FC
- * Club domestic league appearances and goals

Ihor Hryhorovych Nychenko (Ukrainian: Ігор Григорович Ниченко; 18 April 1971) is a Ukrainian former professional football coach and former player who played as a forward.

== Playing career ==
Nichenko was born on 18 April 1971 in Kherson. He studied at the Kherson Children-Youth Sport school No. 1 with instructor Vasyl Kravchenko. Nichenko started his career in the early 1990s in Khmelnytsky at its team in the 1989 Soviet Second League. Next year he was drafted to the top league's Metalist Kharkiv where he could not find his touch. In 1992, he returned to his hometown Kherson, joining Krystal. After an impressive start at the club in the Ukrainian First League, Nichenko was signed by the Kryvbas club at the end of 1992. In Kryvbas he set a record for the goals scored in a game and the goals scored in a season (12), finishing third amongst the best scorers. At the top level of Soviet and Ukrainian competitions, he played over 100 matches with 87 in the Ukrainian Premier League.

Since 1995 and for the next 10 years, Nichenko played in various Hungarian clubs such as Ferencvaros, Dunaferr, and others. There he became the two-time champion with those teams. He was also the top scorer of the Hungarian championship in 1996–97 for Ferencvaros, scoring 18 goals, and becoming the first foreign player ever to score the most goals in a season in Hungary. He played more than 250 games in Hungary scoring almost 100 goals. Since 2005, he has been signed with Ukrainian clubs, but has not played any games officially.

== Coaching career ==
Upon retiring, Nichenko stayed in FC Krystal Kherson working together with Yuriy Martynov as the head coach. In 2007, he joined the local amateur club, Sigma Kherson, as a staff coach and since 2008 has been its head coach.

== Sources ==
- Реєстр матчів гравця на офіційному сайті ФФУ
- Прoфиль на сайте "Футболфан" (in Russian)
- Статистика на сайті КЛИСФ (in Russian)
- Ігор Ніченко хоче грати на Батьківщині (in Russian)
- Український легіонер Ігор Ніченко завершив виступи в елітних клубах Угорщини
- Херсонська "Сигма" – чемпіон області-2008
- "Кривбас" для вас
