= Ferencvárosi TC =

Hungarian football club

Ferencváros
- Full name: Ferencvárosi Torna Club
- Nicknames: Ferencváros, FTC and Fradi, zöldek (The greens)
- Short name: FTC
- Founded: 3 May 1899; 127 years ago
- Ground: Ferencváros Stadion
- Capacity: 23,700
- President: Gábor Kubatov
- Head coach: Balázs Borbély
- League: NB I
- 2025–26: NB I, 2nd of 12
- Website: fradi.hu
Home colours	Away colours	Third colours

Ferencvárosi Torna Club, commonly known as Ferencváros (Hungarian: [ˈfɛrɛnt͡svaːroʃ]), Fradi, FTC is a Hungarian professional football club based in Budapest, that competes in the Nemzeti Bajnokság I, the top flight of Hungarian football. Ferencváros was founded in 1899 by Ferenc Springer and a group of local residents of Budapest's ninth district, Ferencváros. Domestically, the club has won the Nemzeti Bajnokság I 36 times, Magyar Kupa 24 times and Szuperkupa 6 times—all competition records. Internationally, they won the 1964–65 edition of the Inter-Cities Fairs Cup after defeating Juventus 1–0 in Turin in the final. Ferencváros also reached the final in the same competition in 1968, when they lost to Leeds United, as well as the final in the 1974–75 season of the European Cup Winners' Cup, losing to Dynamo Kyiv.

The best-known part of the club is the well-supported men's football team. The parent multisport club Ferencvárosi TC divisions include women's football, women's handball, men's futsal, men's ice hockey, men's handball, men's water polo, cycling, gymnastics, athletics, wrestling, curling and swimming teams.

The club colours are green and white, and the club's mascot is a green eagle, hence another of the club's nicknames, The Green Eagles.

== History ==
On 3 May 1899, Ferencvárosi TC was founded by citizens of the 9th district of Budapest. With the exception of three seasons between 2006 and 2009, Ferencváros have played in the Nemzeti Bajnokság I since its inception in 1901. The club's financial problems in 2006 resulted in the Hungarian Football Federation (MLSZ) withdrawing the club's licence; a withdrawal that was eventually deemed unauthorized. Following this, Fradi were promoted back to the first division in 2009.

Ferencváros are the most successful Hungarian team both domestically and internationally. They won the 1964–65 Inter-Cities Fairs Cup and have also won the Nemzeti Bajnokság I 36 times and the Magyar Kupa 24 times.

They qualified for the renewed Champions League, the first Hungarian club to do so, in the 1995–1996 season. Since then, the club have also taken part in the 2004–05 UEFA Cup, 2019–20 Europa League, 2020–21 Champions League, and 2021–22 Europa League group stages.

On 3 December 1900 the football section of the club was established. Two months later, on 10 February, the first Hungarian championship match took place between Ferencváros and Budapesti TC, though it was not officially recognized by the Hungarian Football Federation. The first official championship match was played on 21 April 1901, when Ferencváros suffered a 5–3 defeat against MUE. Borbás Gáspár, then 17 years old, scored Ferencváros' first official championship goal. The first point was earned in a 2–2 draw against Műegyetem, and the first victory came on 16 June 1901 (FTC-Budapesti SC 5–1).

Interestingly, Ferencváros made its international debut earlier than in domestic competitions. On 25 March 1901, the Viennese Cricketer defeated the Hungarian team 9–0. On 5 May, against the Old Cricketer (5–0, the first Ferencváros victory in international competition), the players wore the first badge with five green and four white stripes and three inverted E's in a green shield at the bottom – a design that still references the club's motto: morals, strength, unity.

In 1902, Ferencváros suffered its heaviest defeat, losing 16–0 against the English team Oxford FC. The club secured its first championship title in 1903 and the second in 1905, followed by three more in the 1900s (1906/07, 1908/09, 1909/10). On 6 June 1909 FTC permanently won the first Hungarian football challenge trophy, capturing the silver ball for the fifth time.

On 12 February 1911 Ferencváros inaugurated its new stadium on Üllői Road, Ferencváros Stadion, where it still plays today. Schlosser Imre scored the first green-and-white goal in the new facility. In 1911, the club won its third consecutive championship title, remaining unbeaten in 21 matches that season. In 1912, Ferencváros defeated Working FC, winning against an English team in England for the first time. In the same year, they beat the III. district team 11–3, with Schlosser scoring eight goals in one match, a record that still stands for goals scored in a single match. The 1911/12 championship brought another Ferencváros title, marking the club's seventh.

In 1913, Ferencváros achieved not only the championship title but also won the Hungarian Cup for the first time in its history.

In 1914, World War I broke out, bringing a somber year for Ferencváros football players. Almost every member of the team received military service call-ups, and many of them never returned home.

== Crest and colours ==
The colours of the club are green and white. The nine stripes on the club badge, five green and four white, symbolise the district of Ferencváros, Budapest's ninth district. The three E's on Ferencváros' badge represent the club's motto of Erkölcs, Erő, Egyetértés (English: Morality, Strength, Understanding).

=== Naming history ===
Ferencvárosi TC has changed names various times throughout their history:

- 1899–1950: Ferencvárosi Torna Club
- 1950–1951: ÉDOSZ SE
- 1951–1956: Kinizsi
- 1956–present: Ferencvárosi Torna Club

=== Kit suppliers and shirt sponsors ===
The following table shows in detail Ferencvárosi TC kit manufacturers and shirt sponsors by year:

Period	Kit manufacturer	Shirt sponsor
1979−1987	Adidas	Márka
1987–1990	Adidas	Pepsi
1990–1991	Adidas	Hargita Kft.
1991–1992	Adidas	Postabank RT
1992–1993	Umbro	Postabank RT
1993–1995	Umbro	West
1995–1996	Adidas	West
1996–1999	Adidas	Symphonia
1999–2000	Adidas	AVIS
2000–2001	Adidas	Dunapack
2002	Adidas	Arany Ászok
2002–2003	Adidas	Westel
2003–2004	Nike	Westel
2004–2007	Nike	T-Mobile
2007–2008	Nike	Orangeways / Interwetten
2008–2009	Nike	Orangeways
2009–2010	Nike	Unibet
2010–2011	Nike	FantasticLeague.com
2011–2014	Nike	Groupama Garancia
2015	Nike	Fő Taxi
2015–2024	Nike	T-Mobile
2024–	Macron	T-Mobile

Current sponsorships:

- Official Sport Clothing Manufacturer: Macron
- Main Sponsor: T-Mobile
- Naming Right Partner: Groupama
- Exclusive Partners: Group MvM, Penny Market, Tippmix, Groupama, Hsa Group

== Stadium ==
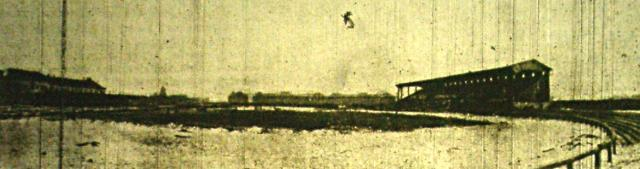
Üllői út (1911–1974)

The first stadium of the club started being built in the autumn of 1910. On 12 February 1911, Ferencváros played their first match against Budapest rival MTK Budapest which was won by the club. The starting line-up consisted of Fritz, Rumbold, Magnlitz, Weinber, Bródy, Payer, Szeitler, Weisz, Koródy, Schlosser, Borbás. The first stadium could host 40,000 spectators.

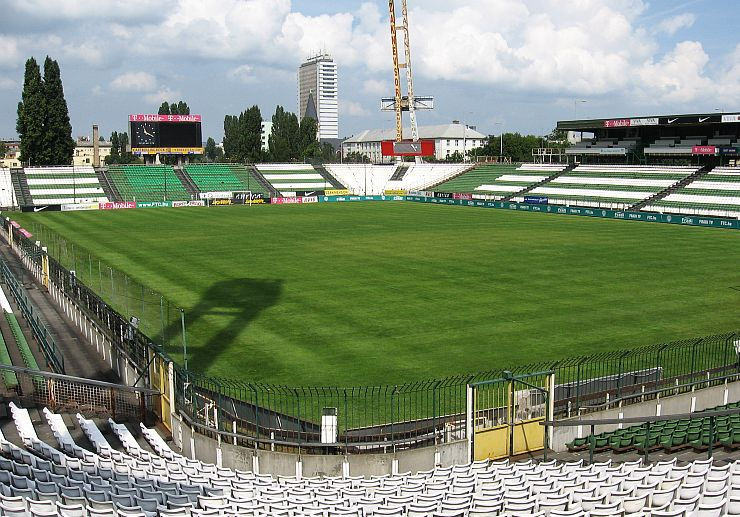
Albert Stadion (1974–2014)

In 1971 the stands were demolished and a new stadium began to be built. The new stadium was inaugurated on the 75th anniversary of the club. On 19 May 1974, the first match was played against Vasas. The new stadium could host 29,505 spectators (including 10,771 seats and 18,734 standing). In the 1990s the stadium was redesigned to meet the UEFA requirements therefore its capacity was reduced to 18,100. When Ferencváros qualified for the 1995–96 UEFA Champions League group stage, a new journalist stand was built over the main stand.

On 21 December 2007, the stadium's name was changed from Üllői úti Stadion to Stadion Albert Flórián. Flórián Albert, the former Ferencváros icon, was present at the inauguration ceremony. There were many plans on how to increase the capacity of the stadium in case the Hungarian Football Federation won the bid for the UEFA Euro 2008 or the Euro 2012. However, the Federation did not win any bids therefore the reconstruction of the stadium was delayed.

When Kevin McCabe became the owner of the club the reconstruction was on schedule again. Later, McCabe sold his team to the Hungarian state and the reconstruction did not take place.

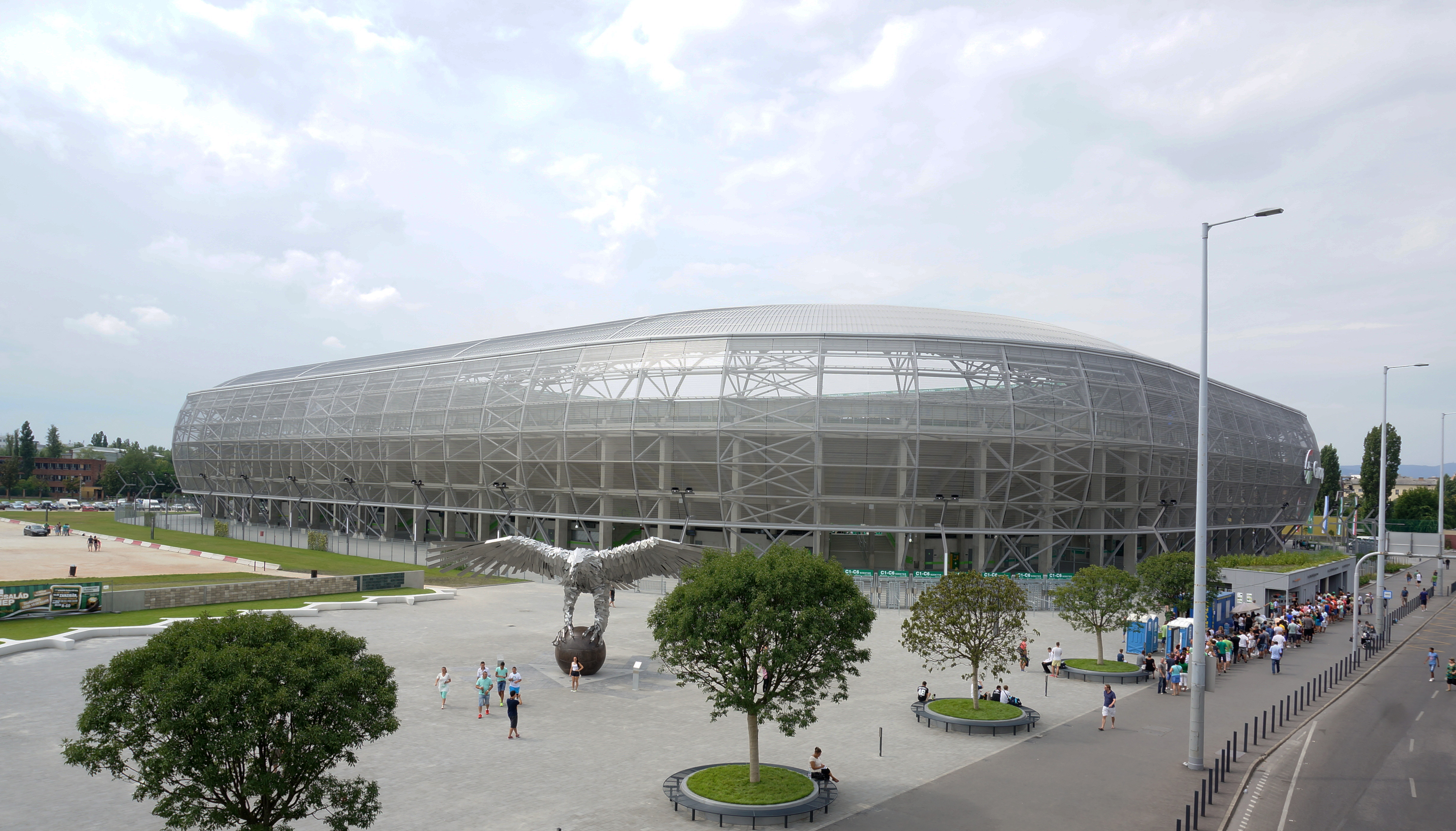
Ferencváros Stadion (2014–present)

Groupama Aréna, multi-purpose stadium, is the third home of the club. It has a capacity of 20,000 spectators in UEFA matches and 23,700 in Hungarian League matches.

When Gábor Kubatov was elected as president of the club, he and Pál Orosz managed to raise enough funds for the construction of a new stadium. The new stadium was rotated by 90 degrees in order to meet UEFA requirements. Therefore, the main stand which was parallel to the Üllői út became parallel to the Hungária körút. As part of the national stadium reconstruction programme the new stadium was built between 2013 and 2014.

The stadium was designed by Ágnes Streit and Szabolcs Kormos and was built by Market Építő Zrt from 2013 to 2014. In the arena there can be found the Ferencváros Museum and a fan shop too. The stadium is cutting edge in its vein matching entrance system. On 10 August 2014, Ferencváros played the opening match against Chelsea.

After the demolition of the Puskás Ferenc Stadion, Hungary played their home matches at the new arena until the new Puskás Ferenc Stadion was opened in late 2019. The national team celebrated the victory against Norway after a 2–1 win at the UEFA Euro 2016 qualifying play-off.

== Ownership ==
On 14 February 2008, Sheffield United public limited company chairman Kevin McCabe successfully acquired a tender to purchase Ferencváros. McCabe's Hungarian company, Esplanade Limited liability company bought Ferencváros' real estate for £8.45 million with a view to start paying off the £5 million debt. In April 2008, Ferencváros Torna Club officially agreed to sell the football club, Ferencváros Labdarúgó ZRt. to Esplanade Kft., McCabe's company in Hungary.

In 2011, McCabe relinquished his ownership of the club after describing a "strained relationship" with some minority shareholders.

On 25 February 2011, Gábor Kubatov, Hungarian MP, was appointed as the president of Ferencváros.

On 28 October 2014, Gábor Kubatov was re-elected to serve another four-year term as the president of the club.

== Club identity, supporters and rivalries ==
Supporters of Ferencváros are mainly from the capital city of Hungary, Budapest. However, the club is popular all over Hungary. Ferencváros' nickname of Fradi is derived from Franzstadt, the German name for the area of Ferencváros, with the club carrying a "vague sense of German ethnicity", according to British sports journalist Jonathan Wilson.

=== 20th century ===
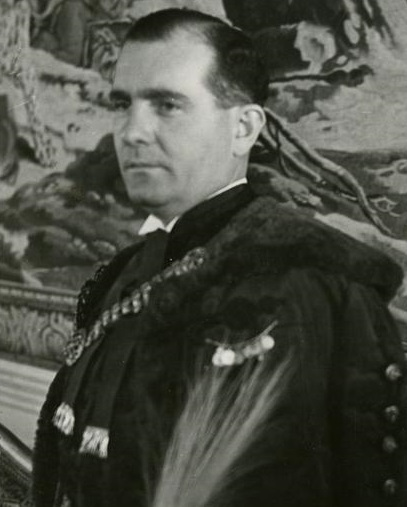
Andor Jaross took control of Ferencváros in 1944.

Ferencváros has long been associated with right-wing nationalist sentiment. The roots of this alignment stretch back to the early 20th century, but intensified notably in the interwar period, particularly during Hungary’s drift toward fascism in the 1930s. As the country embraced authoritarian nationalism under Prime Minister Gyula Gömbös and later aligned with the Axis powers during the Second World War, Ferencváros supporters increasingly adopted an anti-cosmopolitan, often antisemitic outlook. In 1944, the club was taken over by Andor Jaross, a leading figure in Hungary’s fascist regime and organiser of the deportation of Hungarian Jews. This period cemented the club’s associations with far-right ideology.

After the war, under Communist rule, Ferencváros was regarded with suspicion by the Hungarian People's Republic government. The regime, aware of the symbolic power of football, attempted to suppress dissent by altering club identities: Ferencváros’ colours were changed, and the club was marginalised in favour of establishment-aligned teams such as Honvéd (army), MTK Budapest FC (state security), and Újpest (police). From 1949 to 1963, Ferencváros won no league titles, and state surveillance was frequently deployed at matches. Despite these efforts, the club’s identity as an outsider and nationalist bastion was preserved and even strengthened. Fans continued to voice right-wing slogans, and anti-Communist sentiment was rife on the terraces. Following the 1956 Hungarian Revolution, the regime relaxed its grip, allowing Ferencváros to reclaim its green and white colours and resume its traditional identity.

This liberalisation coincided with a resurgence of nationalism and antisemitism in Hungarian football culture. Ferencváros fans were again central: in the early 1960s, they chanted “we defeated Israel” after beating MTK, burned newspapers in front of a rabbinical college, and used chants referencing gas chambers. These actions were part of a broader trend in which far-right sentiment became a means of expressing group identity and defiance against both rival fans and the state. In the 1980s, as state control weakened, Ferencváros' ultra groups, especially the Green Monsters, helped normalise neo-fascist chants and physical violence. By the 1990s, after the collapse of Communism, this orientation was fully visible, with far-right symbolism and aggression spreading from Ferencváros to ultras across the country.

=== 21st century ===
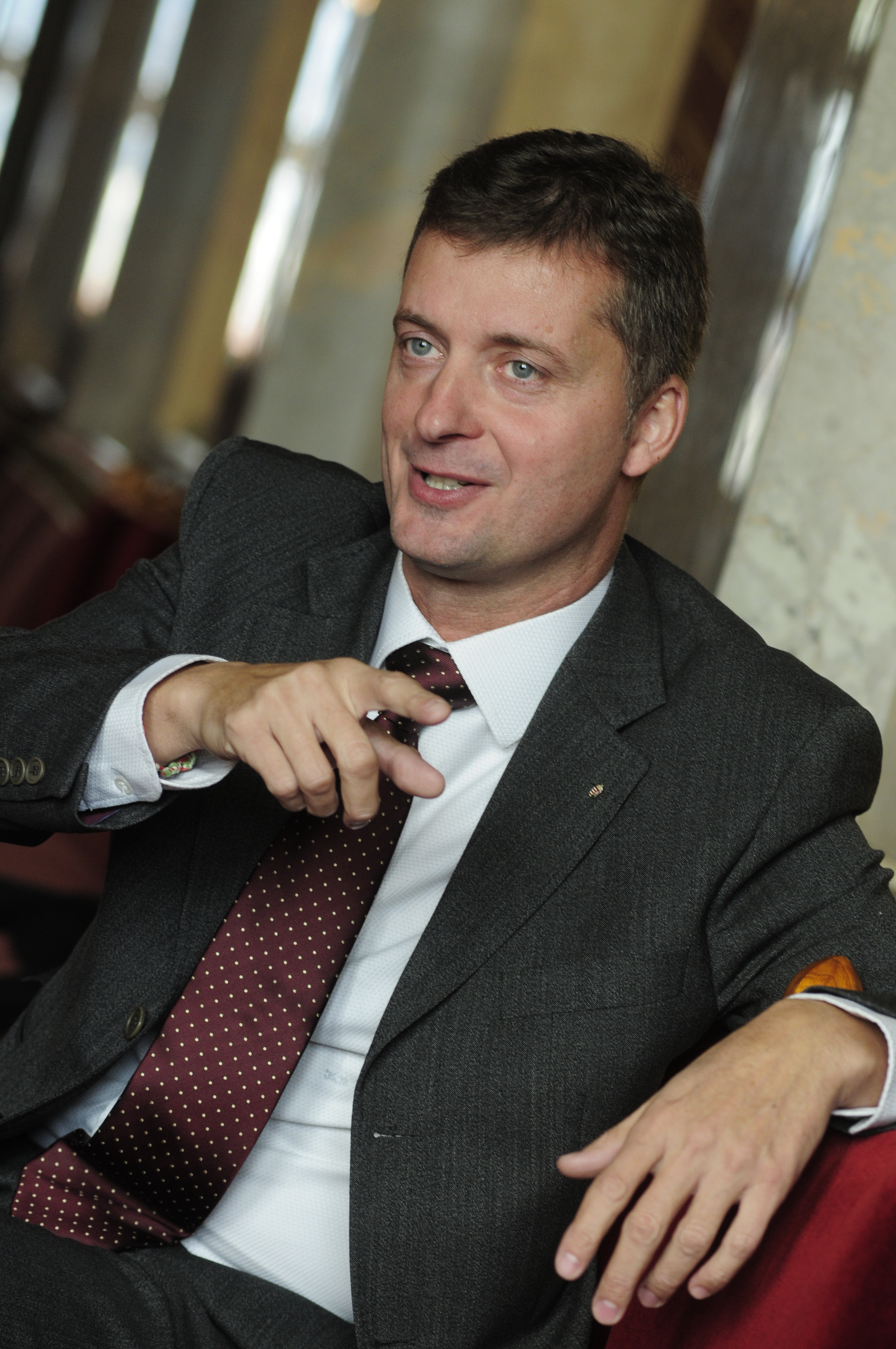
Ferencváros club president Gábor Kubatov is a member of the Fidesz political party, and the two organisations have been linked together.

Since the 2010s, Ferencváros has become associated with Fidesz, Hungary’s ruling party. One of the party's central figures, Gábor Kubatov, is both the director of Fidesz and a prominent figure in Ferencváros’s management. His close ties with the club's ultra groups, especially the Green Monsters, allowed the party to co-opt a powerful subcultural identity. This alliance was notably visible during the 2006 protests against the Socialist government, when football ultras (including many Ferencváros supporters) took part in the siege of Magyar Televízió's headquarters, a pivotal moment that helped destabilise the opposition and laid the groundwork for Fidesz's return to power.

The club has also been used more directly in the party’s political operations. In 2016, a group of men linked to Ferencváros's private security blocked opposition MP István Nyakó from filing a referendum initiative at the National Election Office. The incident caused a national outcry and suggested that forces connected to the club were being used to physically suppress political dissent. This added to the perception of Ferencváros being associated with Fidesz.

Since the opening of the newly built Groupama Aréna, the spectators are scanned at the entrance. As a consequence, the main supporter group of the club, called B-közép, announced a boycott in 2014. Club chairman Kubatov said that he had wanted peace in the new stadium and the club had already paid a lot of fines and punishments due to the unacceptable behaviour of the B-közép. Kubatov had expected that the spectators could have been changed due to the new regulations. However, the number of spectators had not increased in the 2014–15 and 2015–16 seasons.

On 13 March 2016, 10,125 spectators watched the match between Ferencváros' second team against Csepel SC in the 2015–16 Nemzeti Bajnokság III season. The attendance was a protest by the B-közép to show how many spectators were missing from the Groupama Aréna.

On 24 March 2016, the representatives of the B-közép started negotiations with club leader, Gabor Kubatov. As a results of the negotiations they were allowed back to the stadium.

In the 2020s, tensions have also emerged between Ferencváros supporters and the party’s geopolitical leanings. In July 2023, following the club’s early elimination from the UEFA Champions League qualifiers, fans loudly chanted "Russians go home!", a message aimed at the club’s Russian manager Stanislav Cherchesov. While partly a reaction to the sporting failure, the chant also tapped into historic anti-Soviet sentiment embedded in Ferencváros's identity and was interpreted as a veiled criticism of the Hungarian government’s perceived closeness to Russia.

=== Friendships ===
The fans have friendships with fans of Rapid Wien and since both play in Green the alliance is nicknamed the "Green Brothers". They also have friendly relations in Hungary with fans of Zalaegerszeg, in Poland with Śląsk Wrocław and Lechia Gdańsk, and in England with Cambridge United.

=== Rivalries ===
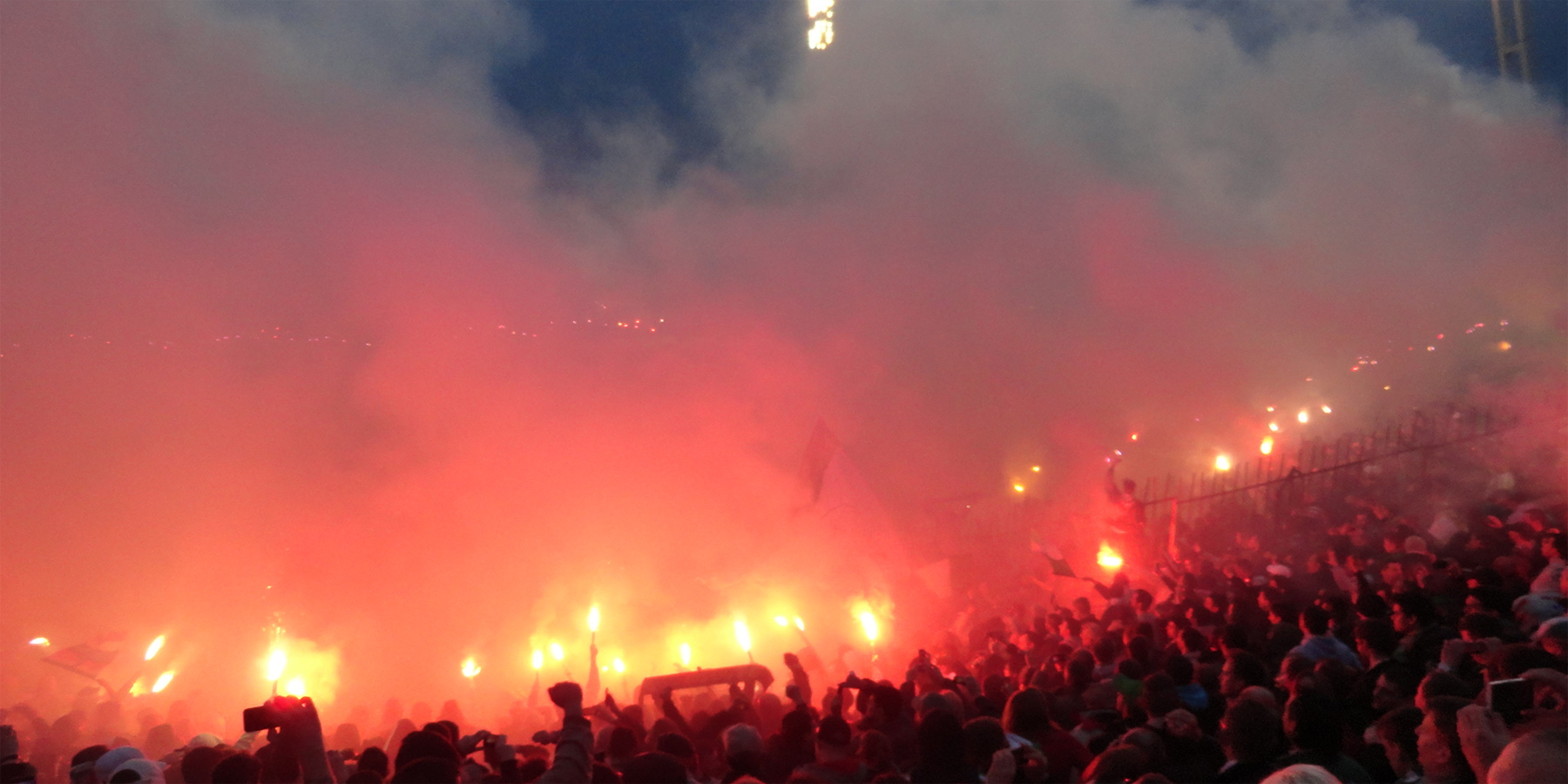
Ferencváros-Újpest derby in the Hungarian league at the Albert Stadion on 10 March 2013

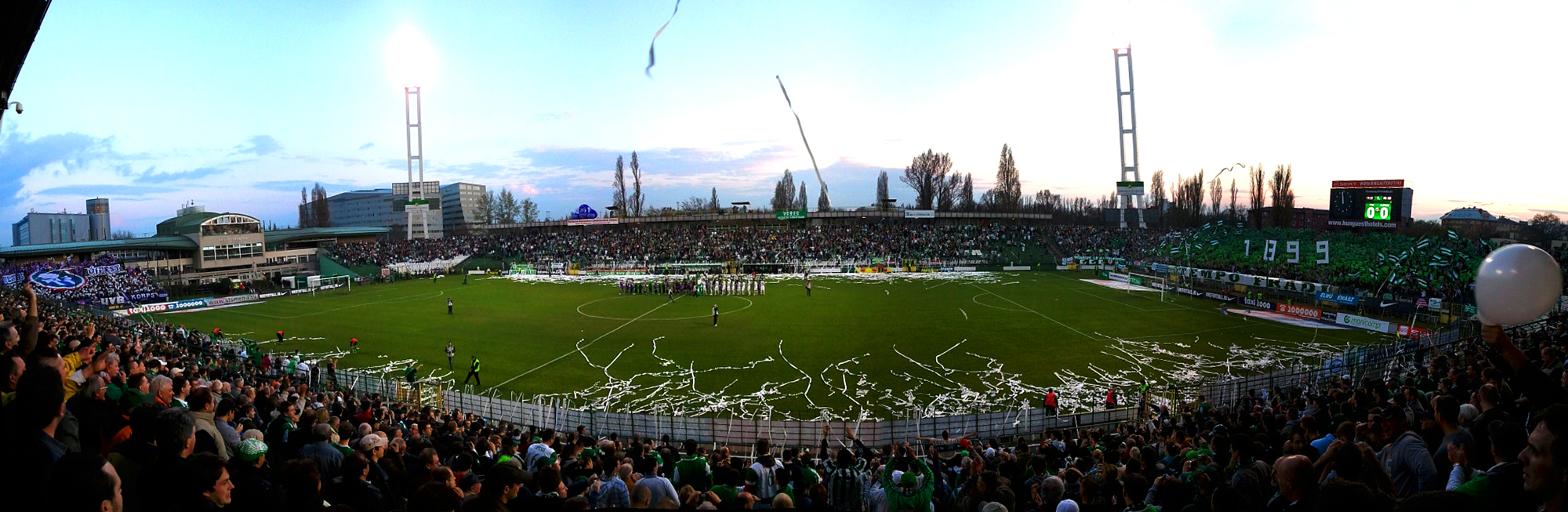
Ferencváros-Újpest derby on 1 April 2011

Ferencváros have rivalry with several teams from Budapest including MTK Budapest, Újpest, Honvéd, Vasas SC, and several provincial clubs such as Debrecen and Diósgyőr. Since Ferencváros has been the most successful club in Hungarian Football history by winning 33 Hungarian League titles, 21 Hungarian Cup titles and 2 Hungarian League Cup titles and the most successful Hungarian club in the European football competitions by winning the Inter-Cities Fairs Cup 1964–65 season, every club in the Hungarian League wants to defeat them.

The biggest rivalry is with Újpest, which dates back to the 1930s when Újpest won their first Hungarian League title. Since then, the fixture between the two teams attracts the most spectators in the domestic league. The matches between the two teams often end in violence which causes big trouble for the Hungarian football. The proposal of personal registration was refused by both clubs.

The fixture between Ferencváros and MTK Budapest FC is called the Örökrangadó or Eternal derby. It is the oldest football rivalry in Hungary, which dates back as early as the 1903 season when Ferencváros first won the Hungarian League. In the following three decades either Ferencváros or MTK Budapest won the domestic league.

Honvéd are also considered fierce rivals as the clubs are in very close proximity to each other and in the past frequently competed for honours.

=== Hooliganism ===
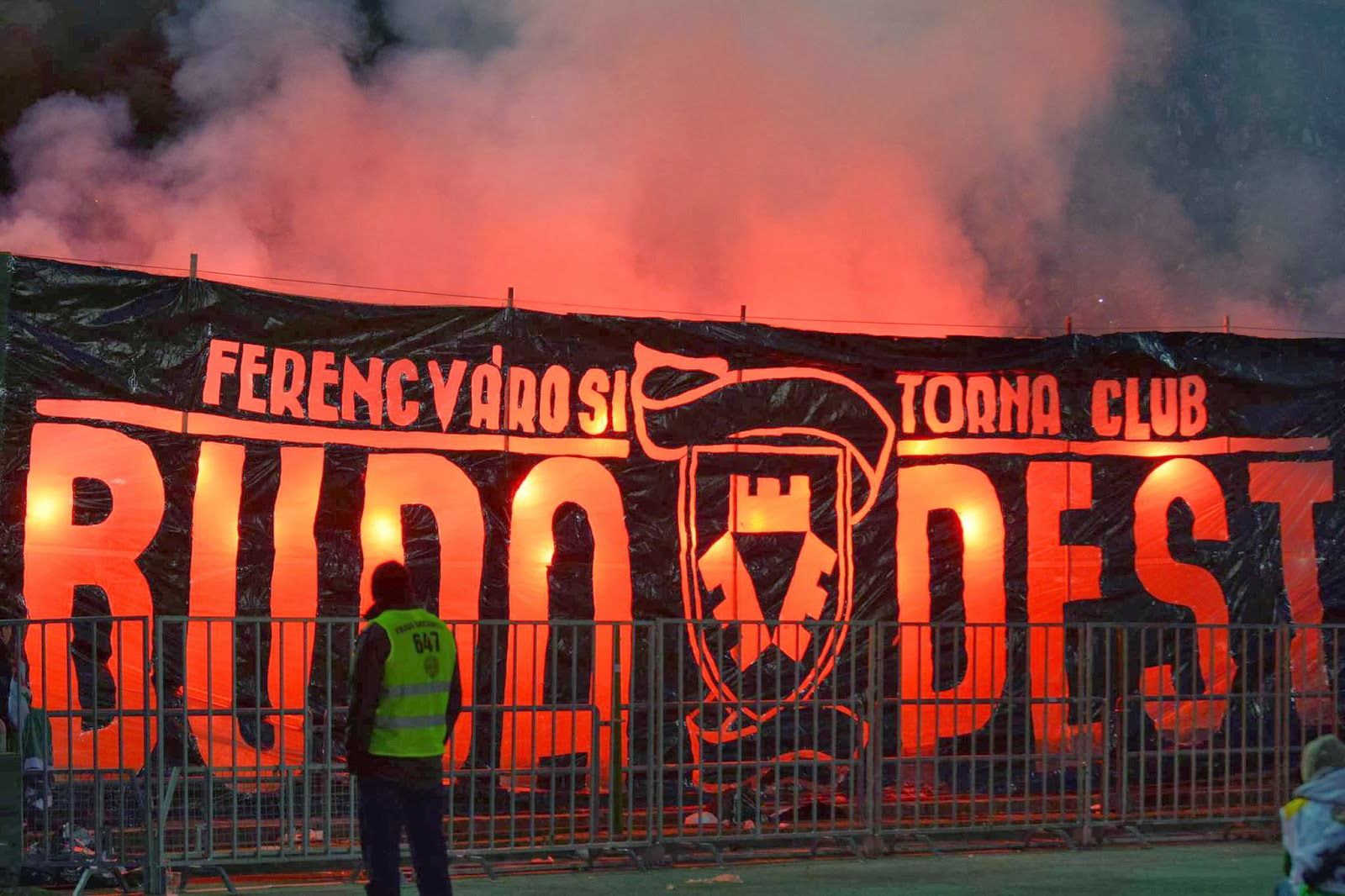
Ferencváros supporters

On 26 November 2002, the UEFA Control and Disciplinary Committee fined Ferencváros €18,300 for fireworks and hooliganism-related offences committed by the fans of Ferencváros before and after the 2002-03 UEFA Cup second tie against VfB Stuttgart on 12 November 2002.

In 2004, Ferencváros were charged by UEFA with crowd trouble and racist abuse after playing Millwall in the 2004-05 UEFA Cup tie in Budapest, Hungary. Four fans of Millwall suffered stab wounds. The racist abuse was directed at Millwall's players of African origin, including Paul Ifill.

On 17 July 2013, Ferencváros fans fought with police after a friendly match against Leeds United, which ended in a 1–0 victory over the Championship club, in Murska Sobota, Slovenia.

On 19 July 2014, UEFA issued sanctions against Ferencváros and Diósgyőr and Slovakia's Spartak Trnava, following racist behaviour by their fans during 2014–15 UEFA Europa League qualifying matches against Maltese sides Sliema Wanderers, Birkirkara and Hibernians respectively. Ferencváros were the hardest hit by the UEFA measures as club were fined by €20,000 and the partial closure of their stadium following monkey chants and racist banners displayed in both legs in Malta and Hungary.

On 27 January 2015, Gábor Kubatov, president of the club, said that he would have the fines paid by the supporters. Kubatov aims to cease the racism and violence at the stadium.

On 9 February 2015, UEFA refused the appeal of Ferencváros in connection with the incidents before and after the 2014–15 UEFA Europa League qualifying match between NK Rijeka and Ferencváros. According to the verdict, Ferencváros supporters were not allowed to attend the following UEFA match at home.

== Honours ==
Ferencvárosi TC honours
Type	Competition	Titles	Seasons
Domestic	Nemzeti Bajnokság I	36	1903, 1905, 1906–07, 1908–09, 1909–10, 1910–11, 1911–12, 1912–13, 1925–26, 1926–27, 1927–28, 1931–32, 1933–34, 1937–38, 1939–40, 1940–41, 1948–49, 1962–63, 1964, 1967, 1968, 1975–76, 1980–81, 1991–92, 1994–95, 1995–96, 2000–01, 2003–04, 2015–16, 2018–19, 2019–20, 2020–21, 2021–22, 2022–23, 2023–24, 2024–25
Domestic	Nemzeti Bajnokság II	1	2008–09
Domestic	Magyar Kupa	25	1912–13, 1921–22, 1926–27, 1927–28, 1932–33, 1934–35, 1941–42, 1942–43, 1943–44, 1955–58, 1971–72, 1973–74, 1975–76, 1977–78, 1990–91, 1992–93, 1993–94, 1994–95, 2002–03, 2003–04, 2014–15, 2015–16, 2016–17, 2021–22, 2025–26
Domestic	Ligakupa	2	2012–13, 2014–15
Domestic	Szuperkupa	6	1993, 1994, 1995, 2004, 2015, 2016
International	Inter-Cities Fairs Cup	1	1964–65
International	Mitropa Cup	2	1928, 1937
International	Challenge Cup	1	1908–09

- record

=== Individual awards ===
==== Domestic ====
Hungarian First League top scorers

Season	Name	Goals
1904	(Hungary) József Pokorny	12
1908–09	(Hungary) Imre Schlosser	30
1909–10	(Hungary) Imre Schlosser	18
1910–11	(Hungary) Imre Schlosser	38
1911–12	(Hungary) Imre Schlosser	34
1912–13	(Hungary) Imre Schlosser	33
1913–14	(Hungary) Imre Schlosser	21
1925–26	(Hungary) József Takács	29
1927–28	(Hungary) József Takács	31
1928–29	(Hungary) József Takács	41
1929–30	(Hungary) József Takács	40
1931–32	(Hungary) József Takács	42
1933–34	(Hungary) Géza Toldi	27
1935–36	(Hungary) György Sárosi	36
1939–40	(Hungary) György Sárosi	23
1940–41	(Hungary) György Sárosi	29
1948–49	(Hungary) Ferenc Deák	59
1957–58	(Hungary) Zoltán Friedmanszky	16
1959–60	(Hungary) Flórián Albert	27
1960–61	(Hungary) Flórián Albert	21
1965	(Hungary) Flórián Albert	27
1980–81	(Hungary) Tibor Nyilasi	30
1989–90	(Hungary) József Dzurják	18
1995–96	(Ukraine) Ihor Nichenko	18
2015–16	(Hungary) Dániel Böde	17
2018–19	(Italy) Davide Lanzafame	16
2023–24	(Hungary) Barnabás Varga	20

Hungarian Second League top scorers

Season	Name	Goals
2008–09 NB II - Eastern group	(Hungary) István Ferenczi	39

=== International ===
Ballon d'Or

- (Hungary) Flórián Albert (1967)

FIFA World Cup Golden Shoe

- (Hungary) Flórián Albert (1962)

FIFA World Cup All-star Team

- (Hungary) Flórián Albert (1966)

FIFA World Cup Best Young Player Award

- (Hungary) Flórián Albert (1962)

European Championship Golden Boot

- (Hungary) Dezső Novák (1964)

European Championship Team of the Tournament

- (Hungary) Flórián Albert (1964)
- (Hungary) Dezső Novák (1964)

== Seasons ==
=== League positions ===
As of 13 July 2026

== Club records ==
=== Top 10 most appearances of all-time ===
As of match played 5 October 2025

Bold: active player

Rank.	Player	Period	Apps
1	(Hungary) Péter Lipcsei	1990–1995; 1997–1998; 2000–2010	428
2	(Hungary) György Sárosi	1931–1948	384
3	(Hungary) Sándor Mátrai	1953–1967	356
4	(Hungary) Flórián Albert	1959–1974	351
5	(Hungary) Máté Fenyvesi	1953–1969	345
6	(Hungary) **Dénes Dibusz**	2014–present	337
7	(Hungary) József Keller	1984–1995; 1996; 2000–2003; 2005	325
8	(Hungary) Gyula Rákosi	1957–1972	322
9	(Hungary) László Bálint	1968–1979	316
10	(Hungary) Zoltán Ebedli	1973–1984; 1985–1986	313

=== Top 10 scorers of all-time ===
Rank.	Player	Period	Goals
1	(Hungary) György Sárosi	1931–1948	351
2	(Hungary) Imre Schlosser	1906–1915; 1926–1927	269
3	(Hungary) Flórián Albert	1959–1974	256
4	(Hungary) Géza Toldi	1928–1939; 1942–1943	213
5	(Hungary) József Takács	1927–1934	209
6	(Hungary) Tibor Nyilasi	1973–1983	132
7	(Hungary) Ferenc Deák	1947–1950	121
8	(Hungary) Mihály Pataki	1910–1927	113
9	(Hungary) Ferenc Weisz	1902–1920	105
10	(Hungary) Péter Lipcsei	1990–1995; 1997–1998; 2000–2010	101

=== Record departures ===
Rank	Player	To	Fee	Year	Ref.
1.	(Hungary) Alex Tóth	(England) Bournemouth	€12 million (Note: Fee may eventually rise above €12 million.)	2026	
2.	(Hungary) Krisztián Lisztes	(Germany) Eintracht Frankfurt	€6 million (Note: Fee may eventually rise above €6 million.)	2025	
3.	(Albania) Myrto Uzuni	(Spain) Granada	€5.1 million (Note: Fee may eventually rise above €5.1 million.)	2022	
4.	(Brazil) Matheus Saldanha	(United Arab Emirates) Al-Wasl	€5 million (Note: Fee may eventually rise above €5 million.)	2026	
5.	(Brazil) Marquinhos	(Russia) Spartak Moscow	€5 million (Note: Fee may eventually rise above €5 million.)	2025	
6.	(Bosnia and Herzegovina) Muhamed Besic	(England) Everton	€4.8 million (Note: Fee may eventually rise above €4.8 million.)	2014	
7.	(Hungary) Barnabás Varga	(Greece) AEK Athens	€4.5 million (Note: Fee may eventually rise above €4.5 million.)	2025	
8.	(Morocco) Ryan Mmaee	(England) Stoke City	€4 million (Note: Fee may eventually rise above €4 million.)	2023	
9.	(Tunisia) Aissa Laidouni	(Germany) Union Berlin	€2.6 million (Note: Fee may eventually rise above €2.6 million.)	2022	
10.	(Uruguay) Fernando Gorriarán	(Mexico) Santos Laguna	€2.5 million (Note: Fee may eventually rise above €2.5 million.)	2019	

== Players ==
=== Current squad ===
As of 1 September 2026

Note: Flags indicate national team as defined under FIFA eligibility rules; some limited exceptions apply. Players may hold more than one non-FIFA nationality.

No.	Pos.	Nation	Player
1	GK	HUN	Ádám Varga
4	DF	ARG	Mariano Gómez
5	DF	FRA	Nathan Zohoré
6	MF	HUN	Ádám Nagy
7	MF	SRB	Veljko Birmančević
8	MF	GUI	Naby Keïta
10	FW	SWE	Jonathan Levi
11	FW	NGR	Bamidele Yusuf
14	DF	HUN	Attila Osváth
15	FW	AUS	Daniel Arzani
16	FW	NOR	Kristoffer Zachariassen
17	MF	ROU	Marius Corbu
18	MF	HUN	Ádám Bagi
19	FW	CRO	Franko Kovačević
20	MF	BRA	Cadu
21	DF	HUN	Endre Botka
22	MF	SVK	Matúš Bero

No.	Pos.	Nation	Player
23	MF	HUN	Bence Ötvös
28	DF	BEL	Toon Raemaekers
29	GK	HUN	Gergő Szécsi
33	GK	HUN	Levente Őri
47	MF	IRL	Callum O'Dowda
54	DF	HUN	Olivér Nagy
63	GK	HUN	Dániel Radnóti
68	FW	HUN	Zétény Varga
71	DF	HUN	Csongor Lakatos
72	MF	HUN	Ádám Madarász
74	FW	HUN	Szilárd Szabó
75	FW	HAI	Lenny Joseph
76	MF	HUN	Krisztián Lisztes (on loan from Eintracht Frankfurt)
77	DF	HUN	Barnabás Nagy
80	MF	CIV	Habib Maïga
88	MF	BEL	Philippe Rommens
90	GK	HUN	Dénes Dibusz (captain)

=== Other players under contract ===
Note: Flags indicate national team as defined under FIFA eligibility rules; some limited exceptions apply. Players may hold more than one non-FIFA nationality.

No.	Pos.	Nation	Player
—	MF	GHA	Isaac Pappoe

=== Out on loan ===
Note: Flags indicate national team as defined under FIFA eligibility rules; some limited exceptions apply. Players may hold more than one non-FIFA nationality.

No.	Pos.	Nation	Player
22	DF	HUN	Gábor Szalai (on loan at Marítimo)
24	FW	BIH	Kenan Kodro (on loan at OFI Crete)
32	FW	SRB	Aleksandar Ćirković (on loan at Jagiellonia Białystok)
70	MF	ARM	Edgar Sevikyan (on loan at Ceuta)

=== Feeder club ===
- (Hungary) Soroksár (NB II)

=== Retired numbers ===
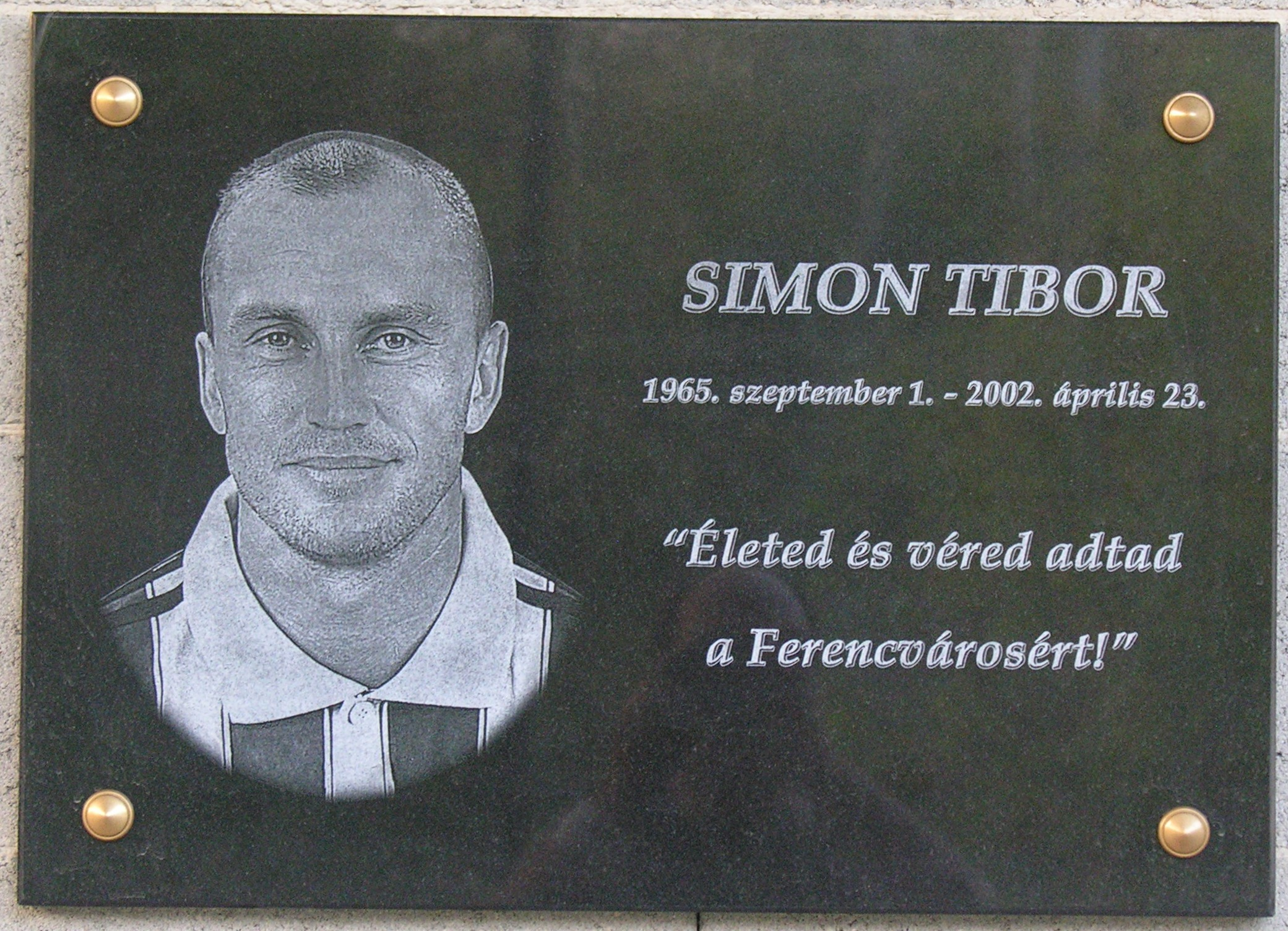
Tibor Simon's memorial

- **2** – (Hungary) Tibor Simon, Defender (1985–99) – posthumous honour.
- **12** – (Hungary) "The 12th man", reserved for club supporters. Number retired in 2007.

=== Notable former players ===
Had senior international caps for their respective countries. Players whose name is listed in bold represented their countries while playing for Ferencváros.

- (Trinidad and Tobago) Akeem Adams ^{12}
- (Hungary) **Flórián Albert** ^{4} ^{5}
- (Hungary) **Flórián Albert Jr.**
- (North Macedonia) Aleksandar Bajevski
- (Hungary) **László Bálint** ^{6}
- (Hungary) **Zoltán Balogh**
- (Hungary) **Zsolt Bárányos**
- (Trinidad and Tobago) Matthew Bartholomew
- (Bosnia and Herzegovina) **Muhamed Bešić** ^{10}
- (Hungary) **Mihály Bíró** ^{2}
- (Hungary) **Dániel Böde**
- (Hungary) **Elemér Berkessy**
- (Slovenia) **Miha Blažič**
- (Hungary) **Zoltán Blum**
- (Hungary) **Gáspár Borbás**
- (Hungary) **Predrag Bošnjak**
- (Hungary) **Sándor Bródy**
- (Hungary) **László Budai**
- (Hungary) **Márton Bukovi**
- (Hungary) **Ákos Buzsáky**
- (Hungary) **Zoltán Bükszegi**
- (Bosnia and Herzegovina) **Eldar Ćivić**
- (Hungary) **Csaba Csizmadia**
- (Hungary) **László Czéh**
- (Hungary) **Zoltán Czibor**
- (Hungary) **Jenő Dalnoki**
- (Hungary) **Ferenc Deák**
- (Hungary) **Lajos Détári**
- (Northern Ireland) Tommy Doherty
- (Hungary) **Attila Dragóner**
- (Hungary) József Eisenhoffer
- (Hungary) Márton Esterházy
- (Hungary) Tibor Fábián
- (Nigeria) Teslim Fatusi
- (Hungary) Gyula Feldmann
- (Hungary) **Máté Fenyvesi** ^{3} ^{4} ^{5}
- (Hungary) **István Ferenczi**
- (Hungary) Pál Fischer
- (Hungary) Zoltán Friedmanszky ^{3}
- (Hungary) Ákos Füzi
- (Hungary) Emil Gabrovitz
- (Hungary) **Zoltán Gera**
- (Hungary) **Ádám Nagy**
- (Hungary) István Géczi ^{5}
- (Hungary) József Gregor
- (Hungary) Gyula Grosics
- (Hungary) Gábor Gyepes
- (Hungary) László Gyetvai
- (Hungary) Gábor Gyömbér
- (Malta) **Justin Haber**
- (Hungary) **József Háda** ^{1} ^{2}
- (Hungary) **Attila Hajdu**
- (Hungary) Tamás Hajnal
- (Finland) **Juha Hakola**
- (Hungary) **Ferenc Hámori**
- (Czech Republic) Marek Heinz
- (Hungary) **Ferenc Horváth**
- (Hungary) **György Horváth**
- (Hungary) **János Hrutka**
- (Hungary) Szabolcs Huszti
- (Serbia) Aleksandar Jović
- (Hungary) **István Juhász**
- (Hungary) **Géza Kalocsay**
- (Slovenia) Adem Kapič
- (Hungary) **Tibor Kemény** ^{1}
- (Hungary) András Keresztúri
- (Hungary) **Géza Kertész**
- (Ukraine) **Ihor Kharatin**
- (Hungary) **Béla Kiss**
- (Czech Republic) Martin Klein
- (Hungary) **Sándor Kocsis**
- (Hungary) **Lajos Korányi** ^{2}
- (Hungary) Béla Kovács
- (Hungary) János Kovács
- (Hungary) Attila Kriston
- (Hungary) (Czechoslovakia) (Spain) **László Kubala**
- (Hungary) Lajos Kű
- (Hungary) **Zsolt Laczkó**
- (Tunisia) **Aïssa Laïdouni** ^{11}
- (Hungary) **Károly Lakat**
- (Germany) Benjamin Lauth
- (Hungary) **Gyula Lázár** ^{1} ^{2}
- (Hungary) **Leandro**
- (Hungary) **Miklós Lendvai**
- (Hungary) **Zsolt Limperger**
- (Hungary) **Péter Lipcsei**
- (Hungary) **Krisztián Lisztes**
- (Hungary) **Antal Lyka**
- (Hungary) **István Magyar**
- (Slovakia) **Róbert Mak**
- (Hungary) **Gyula Mándi**
- (Hungary) **Sándor Mátrai** ^{3} ^{4} ^{5}
- (Hungary) **Győző Martos** ^{6}
- (Hungary) **János Máté**
- (Hungary) János Mátyus
- (Hungary) **József Mészáros**
- (Hungary) (Romania) Vasile Miriuță
- (Jamaica) Jason Morrison
- (Hungary) Sándor Nemes
- (Hungary) **Dezső Novák**
- (Hungary) Elek Nyilas
- (Hungary) **Tibor Nyilasi** ^{6} ^{7}
- (Hungary) Gábor Obitz
- (Hungary) **József Pálinkás**
- (Hungary) **Miklós Páncsics**
- (Hungary) Mihály Pataki
- (Slovakia) (Hungary) **Attila Pinte**
- (Hungary) Attila Pintér
- (Hungary) **Gyula Polgár** ^{1} ^{2}
- (Hungary) **Gábor Pölöskei** ^{7}
- (Hungary) **László Pusztai** ^{6}
- (Hungary) (Soviet Union) Vasyl Rats ^{8} ^{9}
- (Hungary) **Tibor Rab** ^{6} ^{7}
- (Hungary) **Gyula Rákosi** ^{4} ^{5}
- (Hungary) László Répási
- (Hungary) **István Rodenbücher**
- (Hungary) Dénes Rósa
- (Hungary) Gyula Rumbold
- (Hungary) József Sándor
- (Hungary) **Béla Sárosi** ^{2}
- (Hungary) **György Sárosi** ^{1} ^{2}
- (Malta) **André Schembri**
- (Switzerland) (Kosovo) Zenun Selimi
- (Hungary) **Imre Schlosser**
- (Hungary) Ernő Schwarz
- (Hungary) **Geza Šifliš**
- (Hungary) **Tibor Simon**
- (Hungary) **Vilmos Sipos**
- (Hungary) Illés Zsolt Sitku
- (Hungary) (Nigeria) **Thomas Sowunmi**
- (North Macedonia) **Stefan Spirovski**
- (Hungary) **Imre Szabics**
- (Hungary) **Ferenc Szabó**
- (Hungary) József Szabó
- (Hungary) **László Szabó**
- (Hungary) Ferenc Szedlacsek
- (Hungary) Tamás Szekeres
- (Hungary) **István Szőke**
- (Hungary) **Lajos Szűcs**
- (Hungary) Lajos Szűcs
- (Hungary) Ákos Takács
- (Hungary) József Takács
- (Hungary) **Krisztián Timár**
- (Hungary) Mihály Tóth
- (Hungary) István Tóth Potya
- (Hungary) Attila Tököli
- (Hungary) Géza Toldi ^{1} ^{2}
- (Hungary) Dániel Tőzsér
- (Hungary) József Turay
- (Serbia) Đorđe Tutorić
- (Czech Republic) Robert Vágner
- (Hungary) **Zoltán Varga** ^{5}
- (Hungary) **Zoltán Végh**
- (Hungary) Gábor Vincze
- (Hungary) Ottó Vincze
- (Serbia) Dragan Vukmir
- (Hungary) Ferenc Weisz
- (Trinidad and Tobago) Jan-Michael Williams
- (Jamaica) Rafe Wolfe
- (Jamaica) Wolry Wolfe
- (Hungary) László Wukovics
- (Hungary) **Gábor Zavadszky**
- (Hungary) **Zalán Zombori**
- (Ukraine) **Oleksandr Zubkov**

Notes

- Note 1: played at the 1934 FIFA World Cup.
- Note 2: played at the 1938 FIFA World Cup.
- Note 3: played at the 1958 FIFA World Cup.
- Note 4: played at the 1962 FIFA World Cup.
- Note 5: played at the 1966 FIFA World Cup.
- Note 6: played at the 1978 FIFA World Cup.
- Note 7: played at the 1982 FIFA World Cup.
- Note 8: played at the 1986 FIFA World Cup.
- Note 9: played at the 1990 FIFA World Cup.
- Note 10: played at the 2014 FIFA World Cup.
- Note 11: played at the 2022 FIFA World Cup.
- Note 12: suffered heart attack after Ferencvárosi TC–Újpest FC derby on 27 September 2013 and died 30 December 2013. m

== Non-playing staff ==
=== Board of directors ===
Position	Name
President	(Hungary) Gábor Kubatov
Vice-president	(Hungary) Máté Kocsis
Member of the Presidium	(Hungary) András Sike
Member of the Presidium	(Hungary) József Farkas
Member of the Presidium	(Hungary) Miklós Kovács
Member of the Presidium	(Hungary) Beatrix Kökény
Member of the Presidium	(Hungary) György Rieb
Member of the Presidium	(Hungary) Miklós Dr. Springer
Financial Manager	(Hungary) Miklós Szalai

=== Board of Supervision ===
Position	Name
President	(Hungary) György Kassai
Member of the Board of Supervision	(Hungary) Péter Császár
Member of the Board of Supervision	(Hungary) Péter Burg
Member of the Board of Supervision	(Hungary) Gábor Dr. Balczó
Member of the Board of Supervision	(Hungary) Botond Kerényi

=== Coaches ===
==== First team ====
Position	Name
Head coach	(Slovakia) Balázs Borbély
Assistant coach	(Hungary) Leandro
Assistant coach	(Serbia) Áron Szalai
Fitness coach	(Hungary) Bence Kovács
Fitness coach	(Hungary) Márton Bognár
Goalkeeper coach	(Hungary) Tamás Balogh
Video analyst	(Hungary) Ákos Balogh
Performance analyst	(Hungary) András Áder
Doctor	(Hungary) Dr. Gergely Pánics
Doctor	(Hungary) Dr. Gábor Reha
Sports psychiatrist	(Hungary) Dr. Róbert Kárpáti
Medical director physiotherapy	(England) Peter Friar
Physiotherapist	(Hungary) Richárd Nagy
Physiotherapist	(Hungary) Csaba Szabó
Physiotherapist	(Hungary) László Demény
Dietitian	(Hungary) Márton Matyasovszky
Masseur	(Hungary) Gábor Lipcsei
Masseur	(Hungary) Ádám Makkai
Masseur	(Hungary) Péter Czakó
Technical coach	(Brazil) Jeferson
Team manager	(Hungary) Antal Kökény
Kit manager	(Hungary) Péter Csima

==== Second team ====
Position	Name
Head coach	(Hungary) Mihály Tóth
Advisor	(Germany) Theo Schneider

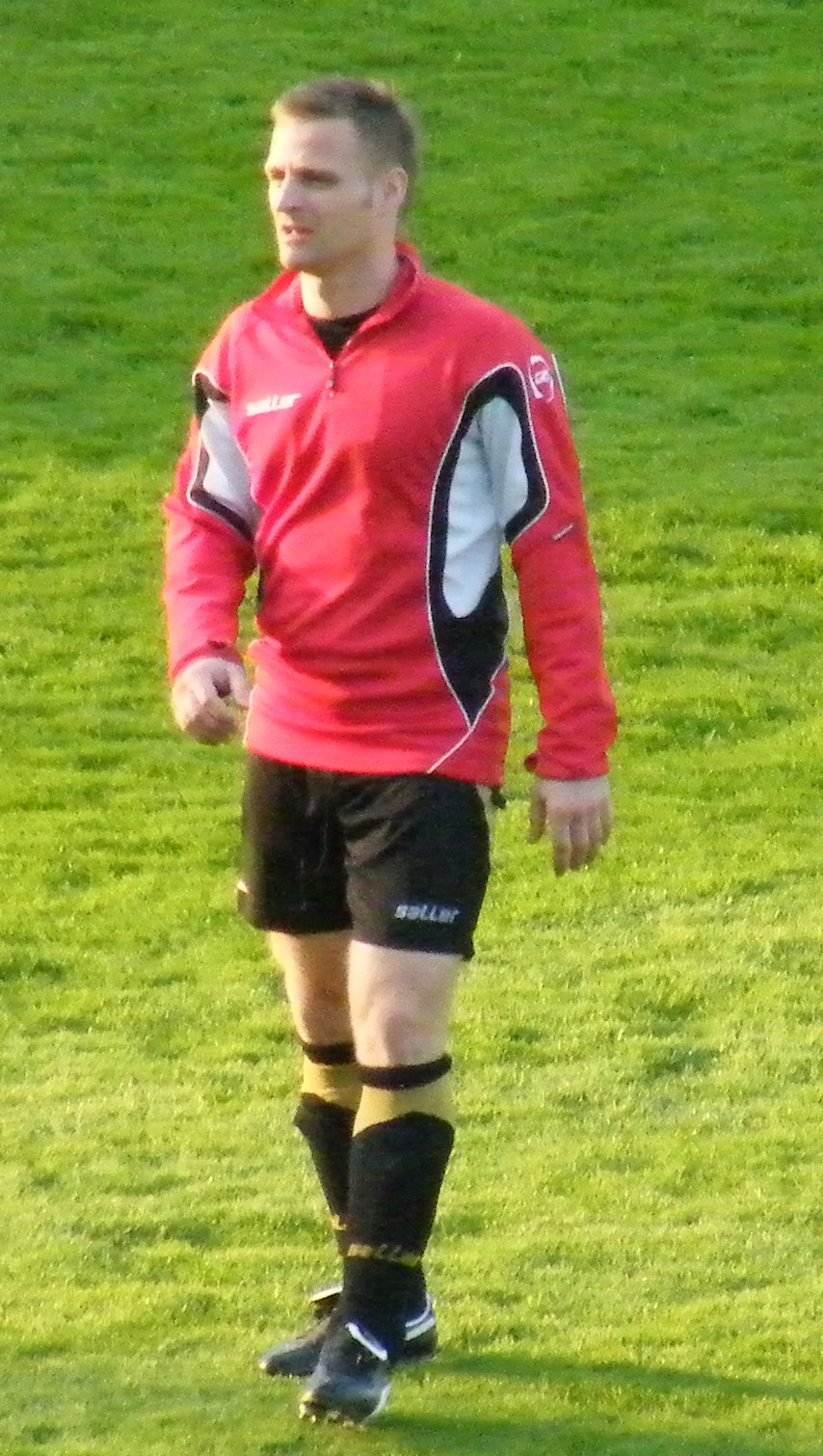
Mihály Tóth is the manager of the second team

=== Former managers ===
Managers from 2010:

	Year
(Hungary) László Prukner	2010–11
(Hungary) Tamás Nagy	2011
(Hungary) Lajos Détári	2011–12
(Netherlands) Ricardo Moniz	2012–13
(Germany) Thomas Doll	2013–18
(Ukraine) Serhii Rebrov	2018–21
(Austria) Peter Stöger	2021
(Russia) Stanislav Cherchesov	2021–23
(Serbia) Dejan Stanković	2023–24
(Netherlands) Pascal Jansen	2024
(Republic of Ireland) Robbie Keane	2025-26

=== Former president ===
	Year
(Hungary) Ferenc Springer	1899–20
(Hungary) Aladár Mattyók	1920–23
(Hungary) Ernő Gschwindt	1923–31
(Hungary) Béla Mailinger	1931–44
(Hungary) Béla Usetty	1937–44
(Hungary) Andor Jaross	1944
(Hungary) Adolf Nádas	1944–50
(Hungary) Ferenc Münnich	1948–50
(Hungary) Árpád Nöhrer	1950–51
(Hungary) István Száraz	1951–52
(Hungary) Béla Komoretto	1953–55
(Hungary) Károly Weidemann	1956–58
(Hungary) János Bédi	1958–62
(Hungary) Aladár Végh	1962–65
(Hungary) István Kalmár	1966–70
(Hungary) János Harót	1970–71
(Hungary) Lajos Lénárt	1971–81

	Year
(Hungary) Tibor Losonci	1980–85
(Hungary) Imre Kovács	1981–88
(Hungary) Károly Hargitai	1985–90
(Hungary) Ferenc Szabó	1988–89
(Hungary) István Debreczeny	1989–90
(Hungary) Lajos Harza	1990–94
(Hungary) István Szívós	1991–98
(Hungary) Péter Szerdahelyi	1994–96
(Hungary) Benedek Fülöp	1996–98
(Hungary) József Torgyán	1999–01
(Hungary) János Furulyás	2001–06
(Hungary) Miklós Inácsy	2006
(Hungary) Zsolt Dámosy	2006–07
(Hungary) György Rieb	2007–10
(Hungary) Miklós Kovács	2010–11
(Hungary) Gábor Kubatov	2011–

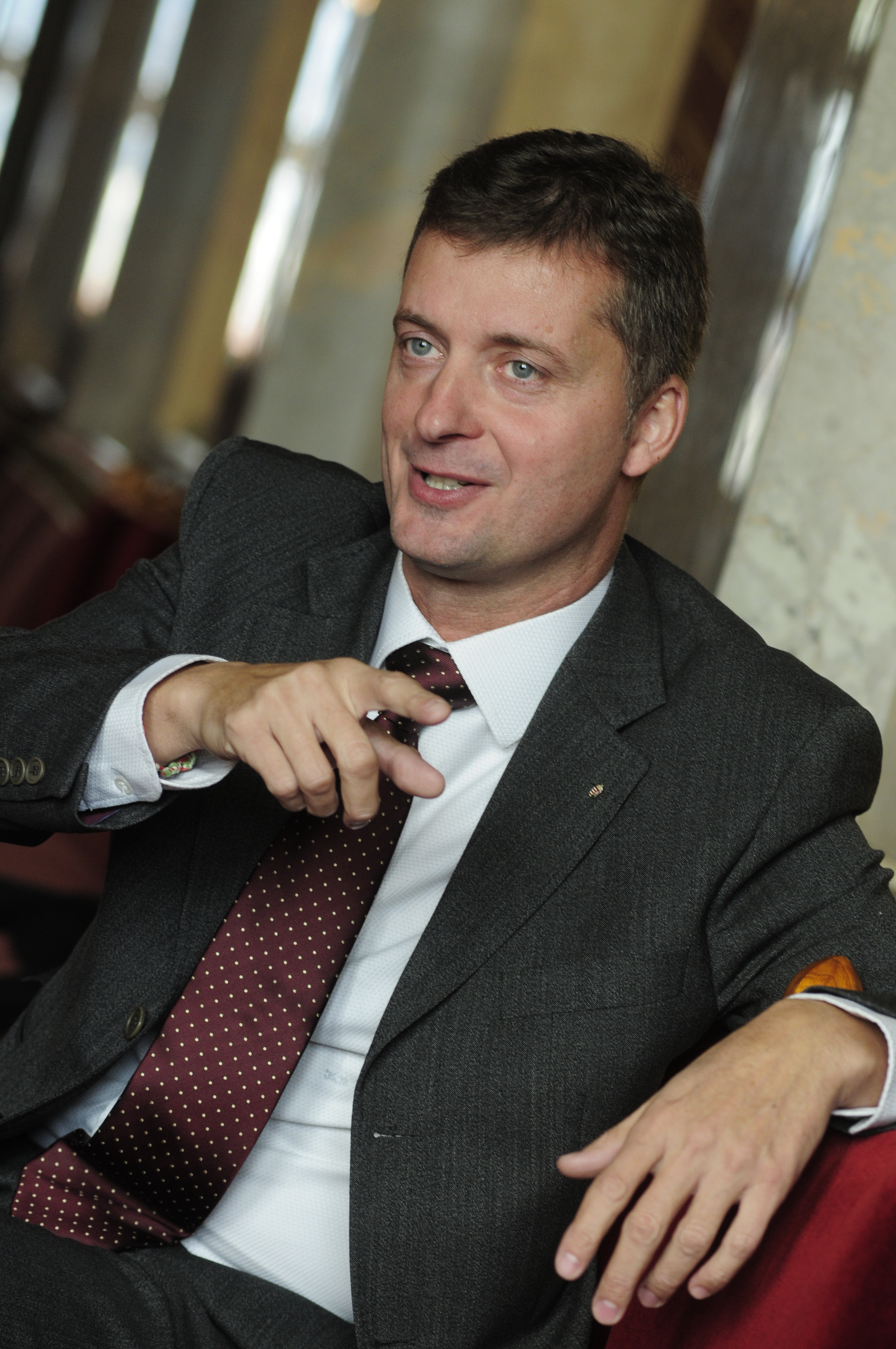
Gábor Kubatov is the current president of the club

== See also ==
- History of Ferencvárosi TC
- List of Ferencvárosi TC seasons
- Ferencvárosi TC in European football
- List of Ferencvárosi TC managers
- List of Ferencvárosi TC records and statistics
