= List of Nemzeti Bajnokság I clubs =

The following is a list of clubs who have played in the Nemzeti Bajnokság I football league at any time since its formation in 1901.

== Key ==
=== Columns ===
| Team | It contains the current, or the last name of the club, or in some cases the most well-known names are given. |
| Operation | The year of foundation, dissolution and reestablishment. |
| First season | It displays they year when the club played for the first time in the Nemzeti Bajnokság I |
| Seasons | The number of seasons played in the Nemzeti Bajnokság I. |
| Name changes | It shows the name changes of the club. The sponsors of the clubs are not displayed. |
| Note | It displays the mergers, abbreviations of the clubs. |

=== Rows ===
| Playing in the 2026–27 Nemzeti Bajnokság I |
| Playing in lower levels |
| Dissolved |

The chart contains the 2026–27 season, too.

== List of clubs ==
| # | Team | City | Operation | First season | Seasons |
|---|---|---|---|---|---|
| 1. | Budapesti TC | Budapest | 1885–1926/2000–2002 | 1901 | 20 |
| 2. | Magyar Úszó Egylet | Budapest | 1893–1948 | 1901 | 5 |
| 3. | Ferencvárosi TC | Budapest (Ferencváros) | 1899 | 1901 | 122 |
| 4. | Budapesti SC | Budapest | 1900–1906 | 1901 | 2 |
| 5. | Műegyetemi AFC | Budapest | 1897 | 1901 | 5 |
| 6. | 33 FC | Budapest (Óbuda) | 1900–1958 | 1902 | 28 |
| 7. | MTK Budapest FC | Budapest | 1888 | 1903 | 113 |
| 8. | Budapesti Postás SE | Budapest (Zugló) | 1899 | 1903 | 7 |
| 9. | Magyar AC | Budapest | 1875–1946 | 1903 | 17 |
| 10. | Törekvés SE | Budapest (Kőbánya) | 1900 | 1903 | 24 |
| 11. | Terézvárosi TC | Budapest (Terézváros) | 1902–1949 | 1904 | 13 |
| 12. | Újpest FC | Budapest (from 1950)^{1} | 1885 | 1905 | 119 |
| 13. | Budapesti AK | Budapest | 1900–1947 | 1906–07 | 13 |
| 14. | Typographia TE | Budapest | 1903 | 1906–07 | 3 |
| 15. | Nemzeti SC | Budapest | 1906–1950 | 1909–10 | 21 |
| 16. | III. Kerületi TVE | Budapest (Óbuda) | 1887–2002/2003 | 1911–12 | 25 |
| 17. | Vasas SC | Budapest (Angyalföld) | 1911 | 1916–17 | 92 |
| 18. | Kispest Honvéd FC | Budapest (from 1950)^{2} | 1909 | 1916–17 | 108 |
| 19. | Fővárosi TK | Budapest | 1906–1926 | 1916–17 | 1 |
| 20. | Budapesti MÁVAG SK | Budapest | 1910–? | 1918–19 | 4 |
| 21. | Újpesti Törekvés SE | Budapest (from 1950)^{1} | 1908–1957 | 1919–20 | 2 |
| 22. | VII. Kerületi SC | Budapest | 1913–1923 | 1920–21 | 2 |
| 23. | Vívó és Atlétikai Club | Budapest | 1906–1949 | 1921–22 | 5 |
| 24. | Zuglói AC | Budapest (Zugló) | 1911–1950 | 1922–23 | 3 |
| 25. | Budapesti EAC | Budapest | 1898 | 1924–25 | 2 |
| 26. | Erzsébeti TC | Budapest (from 1950)^{3} | 1909–1935 | 1925–26 | 1 |
| 27. | Sabaria FC | Szombathely | 1919–1932 | 1926–27 | 5 |
| 28. | Szegedi AK | Szeged | 1899–1976 | 1926–27 | 22 |
| 29. | Bocskai FC | Debrecen | 1926–1940 | 1927–28 | 13 |
| 30. | Attila FC | Miskolc | 1926–1936 | 1927–28 | 7 |
| 31. | Somogy FC | Kaposvár | 1926–1936 | 1928–29 | 6 |
| 32. | Pécs-Baranya FC | Pécs | 1927–1932 | 1929–30 | 2 |
| 33. | Soroksár FC | Budapest (from 1950)^{4} | 1911–1958 | 1932–33 | 10 |
| 34. | Phöbus FC | Budapest | 1932–1957 | 1933–34 | 6 |
| 35. | Gamma FC | Budapest | 1918–1950 | 1935-36 | 14 |
| 36. | Salgótarjáni BTC | Salgótarján | 1920–1984 | 1935–36 | 38 |
| 37. | Elektromos SE | Budapest | 1922 | 1936–37 | 10 |
| 38. | Szombathelyi Haladás | Szombathely | 1919 | 1936–37 | 58 |
| 39. | Szürketaxi FC | Budapest | 1932 | 1937–38 | 3 |
| 40. | ETO FC | Győr | 1904 | 1937–38 | 71 |
| 41. | Szolnoki MÁV FC | Szolnok | 1910 | 1938–39 | 10 |
| 42. | Zuglói SE | Budapest (Zugló) | 1921 | 1938–39 | 4 |
| 43. | Kassai AC | Kassa | 1901 | 1939–40 | 1 |
| 44. | Csepel SC | Budapest (from 1950)^{5} | 1912–2001/2006 | 1940–41 | 51 |
| 45. | Diósgyőri VTK | Miskolc (from 1950)^{6} | 1910 | 1940–41 | 58 |
| 46. | BKV Előre SC | Budapest | 1912 | 1940–41 | 4 |
| 47. | Tokodi Üveggyári SC | Tokod | 1926 | 1940–41 | 1 |
| 48. | Nagyváradi AC | Nagyvárad | 1910–1963 | 1941–42 | 3 |
| 49. | Újvidéki AC | Újvidék | 1897 | 1941–42 | 3 |
| 50. | Kolozsvári AC | Kolozsvár | 1880–1948/1907 | 1941–42 | 3 |
| 51. | Lampart FC | Budapest | 1937–1966 | 1941–42 | 1 |
| 52. | Szegedi VSE | Szeged | 1919 | 1941–42 | 2 |
| 53. | Debreceni VSC | Debrecen | 1902 | 1943–44 | 52 |
| 54. | Erzsébeti Spartacus MTK LE | Budapest (from 1950)^{3} | 1907 | 1945 | 3 |
| 55. | Ganz-MÁVAG SE | Budapest | 1903 | 1945 | 1 |
| 56. | Szentlőrinci AC | Budapest (from 1950)^{7} | 1908 | 1945–46 | 4 |
| 57. | Dorog FC | Dorog | 1914 | 1945–46 | 22 |
| 58. | Pécsi Vasutas SK | Pécs | 1919 | 1945–46 | 3 |
| 59. | Kőbányai Barátság | Budapest (Kőbánya) | ? | 1945–46 | 1 |
| 60. | Herminamezei AC | Budapest (Zugló) | ?–? | 1945–46 | 1 |
| 61. | Újpesti MTE | Budapest (from 1950)^{1} | ?–1951 | 1945–46 | 2 |
| 62. | Budafoki MTE | Budapest (from 1950)^{8} | 1912 | 1945–46 | 2 |
| 63. | Békéscsaba 1912 Előre SE | Békéscsaba | 1912 | 1945–46 | 26 |
| 64. | Debreceni Dózsa MaDISz TE | Debrecen | ? | 1945–46 | 1 |
| 65. | Perecesi TK | Miskolc (from 1950)^{9} | 1920–1975 | 1946–47 | 1 |
| 66. | Testvériség SE | Budapest (from 1950)^{10} | 1909 | 1946–47 | 1 |
| 67. | FC Tatabánya | Tatabánya | 1910 | 1948–49 | 44 |
| 68. | Kispesti Textil SE | Budapest (from 1950)^{2} | 1927 | 1948–49 | 1 |
| 69. | Goldberger SE | Budapest (Kelenföld) | 1928 | 1948–49 | 1 |
| 70. | Nagykanizsai Olajbányász SE | Nagykanizsa | 1945–? | 1949–50 | 4 |
| 71. | Szegedi EAC | Szeged | 1921 | 1951 | 26 |
| 72. | Dunaújváros FC | Dunaújváros (from 1961)^{11} | 1951 | 1953 | 20 |
| 73. | Vasas Izzó MTE | Budapest (Újpest) | 1951–1987 | 1954 | 3 |
| 74. | Pécsi Mecsek FC | Pécs | 1950 | 1955 | 50 |
| 75. | Szolnoki Légierő SK | Szolnok | 1951–1957 | 1955 | 1 |
| 76. | Komlói Bányász SK | Komló | 1922 | 1957–58 | 12 |
| 77. | Budapesti VSC | Budapest (Zugló) | 1911 | 1958–59 | 10 |
| 78. | Miskolci VSC | Miskolc | 1911 | 1958–59 | 1 |
| 79. | Ózdi Kohász SE | Ózd | 1909–1995/1995 | 1961–62 | 4 |
| 80. | Egri FC | Eger | 1950 | 1967 | 6 |
| 81. | Vörös Meteor Egyetértés SK | Budapest | 1907–1975 | 1968 | 5 |
| 82. | Videoton FC | Székesfehérvár | 1941 | 1968 | 56 |
| 83. | Zalaegerszegi TE | Zalaegerszeg | 1920 | 1972–73 | 36 |
| 84. | Kaposvári Rákóczi FC | Kaposvár | 1923 | 1975–76 | 15 |
| 85. | Székesfehérvári MÁV Előre SC | Székesfehérvár | 1909 | 1977–78 | 3 |
| 86. | Volán FC | Budapest (Rákospalota) | 1966 | 1979–80 | 6 |
| 87. | Nyíregyháza Spartacus FC | Nyíregyháza | 1928 | 1980–81 | 13 |
| 88. | BFC Siófok | Siófok | 1921 | 1985–86 | 20 |
| 89. | Dunakanyar-Vác FC | Vác | 1899 | 1987–88 | 14 |
| 90. | Veszprém FC | Veszprém | 1912 | 1988–89 | 5 |
| 91. | Soproni FAC | Sopron | 1900 | 1993–94 | 2 |
| 92. | Stadler FC | Akasztó | 1994–1998 | 1994–95 | 4 |
| 93. | Gázszer FC | Gárdony | 1994–1999 | 1997–98 | 2 |
| 94. | Tiszakécske FC | Tiszakécske | 1993–1999 | 1997–98 | 1 |
| 95. | Szeged LC | Szeged | 1998–2000 | 1999–00 | 1 |
| 96. | FC Sopron | Sopron | 1923–2008 | 2000–01 | 8 |
| 97. | Lombard-Pápa TFC | Pápa | 2004 | 2004–05 | 7 |
| 98. | Rákospalotai EAC | Budapest (from 1950)^{10} | 1912 | 2005–06 | 4 |
| 99. | Paksi FC | Paks | 1952 | 2006–07 | 21 |
| 100. | Kecskeméti TE | Kecskemét | 1911 | 2008–09 | 7 |
| 101. | Mezőkövesd Zsóry SE | Mezőkövesd | 1975 | 2013–14 | 8 |
| 102. | Puskás Akadémia FC | Felcsút | 2005 | 2013–14 | 13 |
| 103. | Dunaújváros PASE | Dunaújváros | 1998 | 2014–15 | 1 |
| 104. | Gyirmót FC | Győr | 1993 | 2016–17 | 2 |
| 105. | Balmazújvárosi FC | Balmazújváros | 2011 | 2017–18 | 1 |
| 106. | Kisvárda FC | Kisvárda | 2003 | 2018–19 | 8 |
| 107. | Kazincbarcikai SC | Kazincbarcika | 1957 | 2025–26 | 1 |

Notes

- Note 1: until 1950 Újpest
- Note 2: until 1950 Kispest
- Note 3: until 1924 Erzsébetfalva, between 1924 and 1932 Pesterzsébet
- Note 4: until 1950 Soroksár
- Note 5: until 1950 Csepel
- Note 6: until 1950 Diósgyőr
- Note 7: until 1950 Pestszentlőrinc
- Note 8: until 1950 Budafok
- Note 9: until 1950 Pereces
- Note 10: until 1950 Rákospalota
- Note 11: until 1961 Sztálinváros

Notes 2

- Ungvári AC played in the 1944–45 Nemzeti Bajnokság I season but the championship was interrupted due to the World War II.

== Number of seasons ==
The following clubs, 110 in total, have participated in the Hungarian League since its inception in 1901 until the 2026–27 season.

As of 30 June 2024.

- **122** seasons: **Ferencváros**
- **119** seasons: **Újpest**
- **113** seasons: **MTK Budapest**
- **108** seasons: **Kispest Honvéd**
- **92** seasons: **Vasas Budapest**
- **71** seasons: **ETO**
- **62** seasons: Haladás
- **57** seasons: Diósgyőr
- **56** seasons: Fehérvár
- **52** seasons: **Debrecen**
- **51** seasons: Csepel, Pécs
- **45** seasons: **Zalaegerszeg**
- **44** seasons: Tatabánya
- **38** seasons: Salgótarjáni BTC
- **28** seasons: 33 FC
- **27** seasons: Békéscsaba Előre
- **25** seasons: III. Kerületi TVE
- **24** seasons: Szeged SC, Törekvés SE
- **22** seasons: Dorogi FC, Szegedi Petőfi
- **21** seasons: Nemzeti SC, **Paksi FC**
- **20** seasons: BFC Siófok, Budapesti TC, Dunaferr SE
- **17** seasons: Magyar AC
- **16** seasons: Kaposvári Rákóczi FC, **Nyíregyháza Spartacus FC**
- **14** seasons: Gamma FC, Vác FC
- **13** seasons: Bocskai FC, Budapesti AK, Terézvárosi TC, **Puskás Akadémia FC**
- **12** seasons: Komlói Bányász SK
- **10** seasons: Budapesti VSC, Elektromos SE, Szolnoki MÁV FC, Vörös Lobogó SorTex, Kecskeméti TE
- **9** seasons: Mezőkövesdi SE
- **8** seasons: FC Sopron, Lombard Pápa Termál FC, **Kisvárda FC**
- **7** seasons: Attila FC, Budapesti Postás SE
- **6** seasons: Egri FC, Phöbus FC, Somogy FC, Volán FC
- **5** seasons: Magyar Úszó Egyesület, Műegyetemi AFC, Sabaria FC, Veszprém FC, VAC, VM Egyetértés SK^{1}
- **4** seasons: BKV Előre SC, Budapesti MÁVAG SK, Nagykanizsai Olajbányász SE, Ózdi Kohász SE, Rákospalotai EAC, Stadler FC, Szentlőrinci AC
- **3** seasons: Erzsébeti Spartacus MTK LE, MOGÜRT, Kolozsvári AC (now (Romania) ), Nagyváradi AC (now (Romania) ), Pécsi VSK, Székesfehérvári MÁV Előre SC, Taxisok, Tipográfia TE, Újvidéki AC (now (Serbia) ), Vasas Izzó MTE, Zuglói AC
- **2** seasons: VII. Kerületi SC, Budapesti EAC, Budapesti SC, Gázszer FC^{2}, Gyirmót FC, Pécs-Baranya FC, Soproni LC, Szegedi Honvéd SE, Szegedi VSE, Újpesti Törekvés SE, Zuglói SE, Budafoki MTE
- **1** season: Balmazújvárosi FC, Dózsa MaDISz, Bőripari DSE, Dunaújváros PASE, Erzsébetfalvi TC, Fővárosi TK, Ganz-MÁVAG SE, Goldberger SE, Herminamezei AC, Kassai AC (now (Slovakia) ), Kistext, Kőbányai Barátság, Lampart FC, Miskolci VSC, Perecesi TK, Szeged LC, Szolnoki Légierő SK, Testvériség SE, Tiszakécske FC, Tokodi Üveggyári SC, Újpesti MTE, Kazincbarcikai SC
- **0** season: Ungvári AC^{3} (now (Ukraine) )

Notes: The teams in bold are competing in the 2026–27 season of the Hungarian League.

^{1} VM Egyetértés SK in the 1974–75 season after the merger with MTK Budapest FC played as MTK-VM.
^{2} Gázszer FC sold the license for the spring round in the 1999–2000 season for PMFC.
^{3} Ungvári AC made his debut in the 1944–45 season, after 3 matches with 0 point club occupied the last 16th place, after which the championships were discontinued due to Second World War.

== By city ==
Correct as of 5 June 2016.

| # | City | No. | Clubs |
|---|---|---|---|
| 1. | Budapest | 50 | Budapesti TC, Magyar Úszó Egylet, Ferencvárosi TC, Budapesti SC, Műegyetemi AFC, 33 FC, MTK Budapest FC, Budapesti Postás SE, Magyar AC, Törekvés SE, Terézvárosi TC, Újpest FC, Budapesti AK, Typographia SC, Nemzeti SC, III. Kerületi TUE, Vasas SC, Budapest Honvéd FC, Fővárosi TK, Budapesti MÁVAG SK, Újpesti Törekvés SE, Turul FC, Vívó és Atlétikai Club, Zuglói AC, Budapesti EAC, Erzsébeti TC, Soroksár FC, Phöbus FC, Gamma FC, Elektromos FC, Szürketaxi FC, Zuglói SE, Csepel SC, BKV Előre SC, Lampart FC, Erzsébeti Spartacus MTK LE, Ganz-MÁVAG SE, Szentlőrinci AC, Kőbányai Barátság, Herminamezei AC, Újpesti MTE, Budafoki LC, Testvériség SE, Kispesti Textil SE, Goldberger SE, Tungsram SC, Budapesti VSC, Vörös Meteor Egyetértés SK, Volán FC, Rákospalotai EAC |
| 2. | Szeged | 4 | Szegedi AK, Szegedi VSE, Szegedi EAC, Szeged LC |
| 2. | Miskolc | 4 | Miskolci AK, Diósgyőri VTK, Perecesi TK, Miskolci VSC |
| 4. | Debrecen | 3 | Bocskai FC, Debreceni VSC, Debreceni Dózsa MaDISz TE |
| 4. | Pécs | 3 | Pécs-Baranya FC, Pécsi Vasutas SK, Pécsi MFC |
| 6. | Szombathely | 2 | Sabaria FC, Szombathelyi Haladás |
| 6. | Kaposvár | 2 | Somogy FC, Kaposvári Rákóczi FC |
| 6. | Szolnok | 2 | Szolnoki MÁV FC, Szolnoki Légierő SK |
| 6. | Dunaújváros | 2 | Dunaújváros FC, Dunaújváros PASE |
| 6. | Győr | 2 | Győri ETO FC, Gyirmót SE |
| 6. | Székesfehérvár | 2 | Fehérvár, Székesfehérvári MÁV Előre SC |
| 6. | Sopron | 2 | Soproni FAC, FC Sopron |
| 12. | Salgótarján | 1 | Salgótarjáni BTC |
| 12. | Kassa | 1 | Kassai FC |
| 12. | Tokod | 1 | Tokodi Üveggyári SC |
| 12. | Nagyvárad | 1 | Nagyváradi AC |
| 12. | Újvidék | 1 | Újvidéki AC |
| 12. | Kolozsvár | 1 | Kolozsvári AC |
| 12. | Dorog | 1 | Dorogi FC |
| 12. | Békéscsaba | 1 | Békéscsaba 1912 Előre SE |
| 12. | Tatabánya | 1 | FC Tatabánya |
| 12. | Nagykanizsa | 1 | Nagykanizsa FC |
| 12. | Komló | 1 | Komlói Bányász SK |
| 12. | Ózd | 1 | Ózdi Kohász SE |
| 12. | Eger | 1 | Egri FC |
| 12. | Zalaegerszeg | 1 | Zalaegerszegi TE |
| 12. | Nyíregyháza | 1 | Nyíregyháza Spartacus FC |
| 12. | Siófok | 1 | BFC Siófok |
| 12. | Vác | 1 | Vác FC |
| 12. | Veszprém | 1 | Veszprém FC |
| 12. | Kiskőrös | 1 | Stadler FC |
| 12. | Gárdony | 1 | Gázszer FC |
| 12. | Tiszakécske | 1 | Tiszakécske FC |
| 12. | Pápa | 1 | Lombard-Pápa TFC |
| 12. | Paks | 1 | Paksi FC |
| 12. | Kecskemét | 1 | Kecskeméti TE |
| 12. | Mezőkövesd | 1 | Mezőkövesd Zsóry SE |
| 12. | Felcsút | 1 | Puskás Akadémia FC |
| 12. | Kazincbarcika | 1 | Kazincbarcikai SC |

== See also ==
- Nemzeti Bajnokság I
- List of Nemzeti Bajnokság I managers
- List of Nemzeti Bajnoksag I stadiums
