= György Sárosi =

Hungarian footballer (1912–1993)

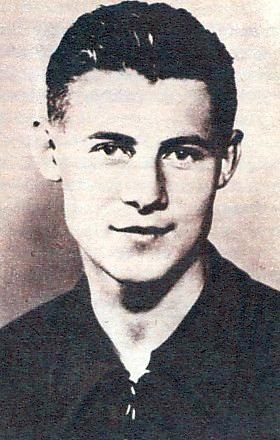
- Sárosi in 1931

Personal information
- Full name: György Sárosi
- Date of birth: 5 August 1912
- Place of birth: Budapest, Austria-Hungary
- Date of death: 20 June 1993 (aged 80)
- Place of death: Genoa, Italy
- Height: 1.86 m (6 ft 1 in)
- Position: Second striker

Senior career*
Years	Team	Apps	(Gls)
1930–1948	Ferencváros	383	(351)

International career
1931–1943	Hungary	62	(42)

Managerial career
- 1948–1950: Bari
- 1950–1951: Lucchese
- 1951–1953: Juventus
- 1953–1955: Genoa
- 1955–1956: Roma
- 1957–1958: Bologna
- 1959: Roma
- 1960: Brescia
- 1962–1963: Lugano
Medal record
Men's football
Representing Hungary
FIFA World Cup
Silver medal – second place	1938 France
Central European International Cup
Bronze medal – third place	1931–32 Europe
Bronze medal – third place	1933–35 Europe
- * Club domestic league appearances and goals

György Sárosi (Hungarian: [ˈʃaːroʃi ˈɟørɟ]; 5 August 1912 – 20 June 1993) was a Hungarian footballer. Sárosi was a complete footballer renowned for his versatility and technique among other things, and he played in several positions for Ferencváros and the Hungary national team. Essentially a second striker, he could also operate in midfield or central defence, and he helped Ferencváros win five Hungarian league titles between 1932 and 1941. He is considered one of the greatest players of the pre-war era.

He scored a goal in the 1934 FIFA World Cup, but his finest hour came when he captained Hungary to the 1938 FIFA World Cup finals, where he scored five goals in the tournament, including one in the final to reduce Italy's lead to 3–2, although a Silvio Piola goal eventually finished off the Hungarians. He finished with the bronze boot for being the third-highest goalscorer of the tournament.

He was named the 60th European Player of the Century in the IFFHS Century Elections. He is also fifth in the all-time top-goalscorers list for the Hungary national team, with 42 goals from 62 appearances.

After his retirement he moved to Italy, where he managed a number of clubs, including Genoa, Juventus, Bari and Roma. He was also manager of Lugano. He died in 1993 aged 80.

== Early life ==
Born György Stefancsics in Budapest on 5 August 1912, the family name was later changed to Sárosi to make them sound more Hungarian. His father was a tailor and raised three children (György, László and Béla); All three became national team athletes – Béla Sárosi also became a footballer, while László Sárosi played water polo (as did his son of the same name, not to be confused with a namesake footballer of that generation, who is no relation). During his school years, in addition to football, György played tennis, table tennis, water polo and athletics. In addition to his perfect technical skills, he stood out from the field in terms of tactics and game intelligence.

He completed his schooling at the Eötvös High School in Reáltanoda Street. The school's football team was in the KISOK league. He was already playing here, with two of his later teammates, Háda and Lázár. The coach of the Ferencváros youth team Károly "Zsazsa" Izsák saw him play several times in the school team.

He joined Ferencvaros's youth ranks as a 15-year-old. When the capital giants wanted to tie him to a professional deal a couple of years later, though, the youngster had other ideas. "I wanted to become a lawyer," Sárosi recalled. "I saw football as something to play for fun, not a career. However, my father (who was struggling for work as a tailor) convinced me that too many people were losing jobs in the depression, and that I was good enough to make a real go of being a footballer."

== Club career ==
=== 1930-1932 : Rise to the first team ===
Aged 18 years old, on 15 March 1931, he made his debut in the first team, in the Ferencváros-Bástya (7:0) championship match. This is how the newspapers evaluated their performance after the match: "Sárosi turned out to be what we expected. Equivalent to a good Bukov, he is in a great location, has a great fit, has a high level of game intelligence, and is the main working judge, a developing centerhalf. He played a definite national team form." "He was only a boy, but on the pitch it seemed like he was the man playing against kids in the park," said Zoltán Blum, who handed Sárosi his bow. "It was just so easy to him. He was big, really strong, quick, never lost a header. He was impossible to bully. Moreover, he played with such confidence – even at that age he played with the confidence of a captain. He would stride out of the defence with the ball, taking on opponents and launching attacks."

His first league goal was in 1930-31 against Pécs-Baranya FC on 17 and 24 May 1931.

Winning the 1931-32 championship was an unforgettable experience for Sárosi. He played in 19 out of 22 matches due to injury or illness. On 8 September 1932, the Hungarian Cup final was played on Hungária út. Hungária-Ferencváros 4-3. A game that Ferencváros lost.

=== 1933-1938 His best years ===
==== Magyar Kupa final ====
At the age of 20, György Sárosi was already one of the best players in the world, and had one of the best performances ever against Újpest in the 1933 Magyar Kupa Final in which Ferencváros won 11-1; Ujpest won the league that season. György Sárosi scored 3 goals and 4 assists, the newspapers gave him the best rating (1) as he was named the MVP of the game.

Anyone who has watched this match will never forget Sárosi's game. Not any Hungarian center has never played better than him [...] When Sárosi passed the defenders of Újpest for the first time, everyone noticed. Because he walked away as if he had no opponent and moved the ball as confidently as if it was the most natural thing in the world. Later, he also proved that he plays with excellent sense, he always knows where to give the ball. And since he was able to do what his situation wanted, the center that Hungarian football so desperately needs developed for us. Many experts in the auditorium sighed: If another Sárosi behind center Sárosi could play center half in the national team, no opponent would cause a headache! He played well the balls he had to play and excelled in the line of struggles he had to control. At Sárosi we could finally see again that he could outwit the opponent easily and without wasting time and we could see that he always plays forward, towards the opponent's goal [...] This great game had an electrifying effect on the others as well.

— Nemzeti Sport

==== The evolution of Sárosi ====
Because of his class with the ball, Sárosi was gradually deployed further forward in the FTC formation – first as an attacking midfielder, and then as a striker. It was in the former position that he headlined their inconceivable 11-1 thrashing of Újpest, who had just won the league title, in the 1933 Hungarian Cup final, scoring a hat-trick and setting up another four goals. But it was in attack that he most often appeared during his 17 years in the green and white. There, he averaged at least a goal per game for eight successive seasons from 1935/36, and twice finished as top scorer in the Hungarian top flight.

From 15 December 1935 (Ferencváros - III. Ker. 5:1) he was already featured as dr. György Sárosi. In addition to sports, he also cared about his future, studying in his spare time because he wanted to graduate at law. Sárosi also remains the most prolific marksman in the history of the Mitropa Cup, a prestigious competition for clubs from, among other countries, Austria, Czechoslovakia, Hungary and Italy – then all leading powers in European football. "Gyurka", as he was nicknamed, helped Ferencváros finish second in 1935 and 1938, and played the leading role in their 1937 triumph.

During the Mitropa Cup battles of 1935, Ferencváros was beaten by AS Roma 3:1 on June 16 in Rome. In the victorious rebound on Üllői út on June 22, Ferencváros - AS Róma 8:0 (3:0), Sárosi scored 4 goals.

In 1937, Ferencváros was the winner of Mitropa Cup. In the semi-finals, they got Austria Vienna who had beaten Újpest. 18 July 1937 first semi-final in Vienna: Austria - Ferencváros 4:1. Fradi played poorly, the Viennese were confident in going to the next round. Sárosi did a good job containing iconic striker Matthias Sindelar, but he couldn't prevent injury-stricken FTC losing 4-1. On 25 July on Üllői út: Ferencváros - Austria 6:1 (2:1), 7:5 on aggregate. It was a miracle that eleven Fradi players had accomplished. One must bow before this miracle, it cannot be explained professionally. Austria, the defending champion, was considered one of the best Mitropa Cup teams of all time. The main force of Ferencváros was in the offensive line, in which dr. György Sárosi provided one of the greatest achievements of his playing career with an electrifying two-goal display, having returned to the strike force. Sárosi was taken on the fans' shoulders at the end of the match. The power of Fradi's amazing heart, which permeated the entire team, was further enhanced by the audience's sometimes ecstatic encouragement. In addition to the 11 players from Ferencváros, this enthusiastic audience was also part of the victory. Dr. Sárosi said: "The most beautiful match of my life. It feels great to have such sincere and great joy for so many people." when Mihály Pataki added : "Defeating this Austria is a colossal achievement that Europe as a whole is noticing."

==== Mitropa Cup final ====
In 1937, Ferencváros had to play with Lazio in the Mitropa Cup final. The first match was on Üllői út on 12 September 1937: Ferencváros - Lazio 4:2 (1:1). The rematch on 24 October 1937 in Rome: Lazio - Ferencváros 4:5 (4:3). Piola scored a hat-trick in 17 minutes. They played in the pouring rain in the second half. The decisive turn was when Háda defended Piola's penalty with a 4:3 lead to Lazio. Ten minutes later, Kiss leveled out. In the 80th minute, Táncos ran away and curved the ball between the six-yard box and the penalty point. Sárosi dr. ran towards the ball, his back to the goal, and suddenly pulled the ball to the goal with his right foot, which cut halfway into the net of Lazio. Dr. Sárosi said it was perhaps the most beautiful goal of his life. Ferencváros won the cup. In the ornament, the Italian president handed over the cup to dr. Sárosi. Led by the "B-Közép" fan club, the Hungarian camp chanted the Hungarian anthem. The team also sang, dr. Sárosi sang with tears flowing from his eyes. After the end of the national anthem, the "Gyurka, Gyurka" calls from the handful of Hungarian fan camps roared through the Eternal City as well. The top scorer of the 1937 Mitropa Cup: dr. Sárosi with 12 goals and 2 assists. In the two legs, Sárosi scored 6 goals and distributed 1 assist. In the second leg, he was given a rating of 1 by the newspapers which makes him the MVP.

Quotes:

"I had never seen a game like this in my life, I just learned what football is. — Giovanni Riccardi

"I considered Sárosi to be the greatest artist, but now I also consider him the best strategist. The smartest football player in the world!" — Referee Wüttrich

"The Ferencváros striker line is a magnificent instrument on which the unsurpassed leader, Sárosi, played the most beautiful melodies. Ferencváros deserved the victory perfectly." — II Piccolo

=== 1939-1948 : Final years and retirement ===
Ferencváros won the 1939/40 championship only by goal difference and luck. In the last round Újpest - Hungária 3:3 (1. FTC 39, 2. Hungária 39, 3. UTE 38). The following 1940/41 championship was won under the leadership dr. Sárosi by 11 points. Player of the year: dr. György Sárosi.

18 April 1948 Üllői út, Ferencváros - Vasas 2:0. He played in this match for the last time in green and white on Üllői út. He said goodbye with brilliant play to his beloved audience, who did the "Gyurka, Gyurka" roar and took him on the shoulders at the end of the match. No one knew it would be his last match. The next day, Monday, 19 April, he left the country with a regular passport. He left for Italy and lived here until his death.

During his Ferencváros career, he played a total of 450 matches, in which he scored 421 goals and distributed 190 assists.

== International career ==
=== Start as a defender ===
Sárosi's international career began as an 18-year-old in a 3–2 loss to Yugoslavia in May 1931. In just his second Hungary appearance, the teenager shackled Czechoslovakia goal machine Antonín Puč, as his country recorded a 3-0 win. Because of his infallible performances in defence, it was not until his 15th outing that Hungary experimented with Sárosi in attack. Predictably, he scored that day against Sweden.

=== World Cup 1934 ===
In 1934, Sárosi played his first World Cup. Despite being injured in the first game against Egypt, he was fit to play in the quarter-final against Austria. Despite scoring a penalty at the 60th minute, Sárosi didn't play well because of his injury that still had an effect on his game. Hungary ended up losing the game 1-2. Nemzeti Sport was very harsh with Sárosi and criticized him for not being at his usual level:

Sárosi, who finally entered the game after his injury, is the one who was believed to be the sure column of the Hungarian world championship, this is the weakest man in the former strike line of Sárosi. The big Gyuri of Hungarian football was soft, weak, pale. Not a single movement evoked the "Easter" times^{[1]}, nor did the real Sárosi give anything. His passes failed, he was the culprit of all success in the crucial situations of the pass. He was not hurt, he was not pushed, and even if it seems like a paradox, Sesta was almost sympathetic. About a bodyguard or a small escort, only one person could turn Sárosi out of the game. That's the axis of the striker line! And yet, this line of strikers could lead a lot of nice action, real football beauties could be deceived, they were. His laziness was up, there was no mention of Sárosi.

Sárosi only played one game in that World Cup in which he managed to score a goal.

=== Hungary 8-3 Czechoslovakia ===
Sárosi most notable performance for Hungary occurred during a 1937 Central European International Cup match against Czechoslovakia. With Hungary trailing 2-1 after the first half-hour, Sárosi scored seven goals against goalkeeper Frantisek Planicka, leading Hungary to an 8-3 victory.

The gates of the Czechoslovakians were defended by the legendary Planicska. One of the heroes of the World Cup in 1934, who no one even managed to score two goals in ninety minutes. The result was 2:2 in the first half. During the break, the federal captain changed the inner trio (Czech II - Dr. Sárosi - Zsengellér). By the second half, almost all Hungarian players had improved. The constantly moving Sárosi dr. he just attracted the balls, despite the fact that 2-3 defenders were constantly hanging on him. Dr. Sárosi could not be kept. The audience was dissatisfied in the first half. In the second half, seeing the improved game, the voice of the audience also came. The encouragement resounded "Huj, huj, hajrá"??, "Gyurka, Gyurka"??. At the end of the match, Sárosi had scored 7 goals, the audience flooded the pitch and, regardless of affiliation, Dr. Sárosi was taken on the shoulders. The next day, the press was full of words of praise. Gyurka! He is an artist of Hungarian football. Hundreds of thousands, millions of eyes. He is one of the most famous and well-known players in Europe and the world.

— Nemzeti Sport

"Scoring seven goals in an international is almost impossible, yet alone past the great Planička," commented his coach that day, Károly Dietz. "But 'Gyurka' was the greatest goalscorer of his era – just look at his statistics." In the evening at the banquet, Planicska was the first to congratulate Dr. Sárosi. With tears in his eyes, he rolled his neck and said: "For a player like you, it's not a shame, and I'll never deny it."

After the game, the newspapers gave him the rating of -1 to credit his amazing performance. Normally the system works like that: "1 = World class. 2 = Good. 3 = Average. 4 = Bad. 5 = Awful." But Képes Sport made an exception for Sárosi who scored 7 goals against the best goalkeeper in the world.

This 7-goal haul helped him to be the top goal scorer of the 1936–38 Central European Cup with a then-record of 10 goals (which was equalled in the next edition by fellow compatriot Ferenc Puskás). With a total of 17 goals in the Central European Cup, he is the competition's all-time top goalscorer.

=== World Cup 1938 ===
In the 1938 World Cup hosted in France. Sárosi's and Hungary's first game was against the Dutch East Indies, the final score was 6-0 and Sárosi scored twice, in the 25th and in the 89th minute. After the match, the Hungarian captain said: "They were stronger than we thought, but also rougher". Despite scoring twice, Sárosi wasn't much involved in the game. In the second game (Hungary - Switzerland 2:0), Sárosi scored again and Hungary went through the next round. This time Sárosi stepped up and was rated highly by the newspapers, yet he was expected to do even better in the next game considering his reputation. Against Sweden in the third game, Hungary won 5-1 and Sárosi delivered a brilliant performance scoring once and assisting 3 times against the Swedes, here is the description of his performance by Nemzeti Sport: "He (Sárosi) had almost reached the top of his form, and this was the mark of the shape-shifting he predicted [...] We had a lot of wonderful stunts from the Hungarian midfielder, who is starting to match his level in Paris [...] He released great long balls to the wind. All in all, he is a midfielder with a generous, phenomenal intelligence."

The 1938 World Cup final (Hungary - Italy) took place in the Stade Olympique de Colombes in Paris, an attendance of 55,000 people was registered. The stadium was not quite filled to capacity for the third World Cup final. After France's exit, interest in the tournament dwindled and this was reflected in the attendances for the later matches. However, the crowd was eager to see whether the Hungarians, with their flowing style of football and their captain György Sárosi, could halt Vittorio Pozzo's Italian side which boasted the outstanding center-forward Silvio Piola. The score was already 3-1 in favour of Italians when Sárosi scored a well placed shot close to the 6 yard box in the 70th minute. Unfortunately for him and his teammates, Italy were known for their good defensive ability and managed to stop the Hungarians from attacking, the Golden Ball winner Silvio Piola scored the final goal of the 1938 World Cup at the 77th minute. Italy were crowned world champions for a second time in a row. Individually, Sárosi was showing a good vision and had a decent game but the Italian defence blocked most of his passes as the Nemzeti Sport described: "He (Sárosi) produced a few great things, bestowing his peers in front of him with beautiful passes. His ideas are great. they were. But the design is already inferior to this fast and hard, all-down protection. His clever draws on this suffered a shipwreck. His passes were annoying because the Italian defenders could reach them sooner than the destinator." He was given a rating of 3 by newspapers which is equivalent to an "average" performance.

During the 1938 World Cup, Sárosi scored a total of 5 goals and delivered 3 assists in 4 games. He managed to score in every game of the knockout stage, an achievement matched only 84 years later, at the 2022 FIFA World Cup by Lionel Messi. His World Cup campaign is considered to be one of the greatest displays in Hungary's history.

== Later life and death ==
He first became the coach of Bari in 1948/49. His greatest success was winning a championship with the Juventus guard in 1952. Until 1977, he worked for ten clubs. He later only coached youth teams.

In July 1976, he visited home for the first time. On 20 July, he was greeted by the FTC Circle of Friends. It was an unforgettable experience. After his football career, Sárosi travelled a lot in Europe, when a journalist asked him what was the most beautiful city in the world, his answer was always one: "Ferencváros in Budapest. It was the narrower scene of my dream-like twenty years – the time of my football career – that I have spent on the Üllői Úti field […] The story of Fradi, and my life is completely intertwined, intertwined within me."

He died on 19 June 1993 in Genoa and was buried there.

== Style of play ==
One match he'd be at the back, and the next he'd be in midfield or up front – that was impressive enough in itself. But what was more impressive was that he was probably the best defender in the world, the best midfielder and the best striker.

— Silvio Piola

Sárosi is regarded as one of the most complete footballers ever. In the mid-1930s, he was nominated in All-European teams published by La Gazzetta dello Sport, Kicker and L'Auto.

Despite being an inside-forward and center-forward, Sárosi could also operate in midfield as a center-half or even a central defender, and played these role in his early and late career. Sárosi was known for his abilities as a dribbler and scorer with aggressive character, and became a physical force with his leadership and teamwork ability.

== Career statistics ==
=== Club ===
Season	Club	Division	Nemzeti Bajnokság I		Magyar Kupa		Mitropa Cup		Total	
Season	Club	Division	Apps	Goals	Apps	Goals	Apps	Goals	Apps	Goals
1930–31	Ferencváros	Nemzeti Bajnokság I	7	2	4	0	—		11	2
1931–32	Ferencváros	Nemzeti Bajnokság I	19	4	2	0	2	3	23	7
1932–33	Ferencváros	Nemzeti Bajnokság I	22	8	3	5	—		25	13
1933–34	Ferencváros	Nemzeti Bajnokság I	20	24	—		5	7	25	31
1934–35	Ferencváros	Nemzeti Bajnokság I	20	22	4	6	8	9	32	37
1935–36	Ferencváros	Nemzeti Bajnokság I	21	37	—		2	4	23	41
1936–37	Ferencváros	Nemzeti Bajnokság I	19	29	—		9	12	28	41
1937–38	Ferencváros	Nemzeti Bajnokság I	20	29	—		8	7	28	36
1938–39	Ferencváros	Nemzeti Bajnokság I	20	26	—		6	2	26	28
1939–40	Ferencváros	Nemzeti Bajnokság I	23	23	—		2	6	25	29
1940–41	Ferencváros	Nemzeti Bajnokság I	22	29	1	0	—		23	29
1941–42	Ferencváros	Nemzeti Bajnokság I	19	19	2	4	—		21	23
1942–43	Ferencváros	Nemzeti Bajnokság I	15	6	2	3	—		17	9
1943–44	Ferencváros	Nemzeti Bajnokság I	28	11	6	3	—		34	14
1944	Ferencváros	Nemzeti Bajnokság I	13	14	—		—		13	14
1945	Ferencváros	Nemzeti Bajnokság I	18	16	—		—		18	16
1945–46	Ferencváros	Nemzeti Bajnokság I	31	31	—		—		31	31
1946–47	Ferencváros	Nemzeti Bajnokság I	29	15	—		—		29	15
1947–48	Ferencváros	Nemzeti Bajnokság I	18	5	—		—		18	5
Total			384	350	24	21	42	50	450	421

=== International ===
Year	Caps	Goals
1931	5	0
1932	5	0
1933	8	1
1934	7	10
1935	6	8
1936	5	3
1937	6	10
1938	5	6
1939	7	1
1940	7	3
1941	0	0
1942	0	0
1943	1	0
Total	62	42

== International goals ==
Hungary score listed first, score column indicates score after each Sárosi goal.

List of international goals scored by György Sárosi
No.	Cap	Date	Venue	Opponent	Score	Result	Competition
1	15	2 July 1933	Råsunda Stadium, Solna, Sweden	Sweden	1–0	2–5	Friendly
2	19	25 March 1934	Stadion Balgarska Armia, Sofia, Bulgaria	Bulgaria	1–1	4–1	1934 FIFA World Cup qualifying
3	20	15 April 1934	Hohe Warte Stadium, Vienna, Austria	Austria	1–0	5–2	Friendly
4	20	15 April 1934	Hohe Warte Stadium, Vienna, Austria	Austria	2–2	5–2	Friendly
5	21	29 April 1934	Stadion Letná, Prague, Czechoslovakia	Czechoslovakia	1–1	2–2	1933-35 Central European Cup
6	21	29 April 1934	Stadion Letná, Prague, Czechoslovakia	Czechoslovakia	2–2	2–2	1933-35 Central European Cup
7	22	10 May 1934	Üllői úti stadion, Budapest, Hungary	England	2–0	2–1	Friendly
8	23	31 May 1934	Stadio Littoriale, Bologna, Italy	Austria	1–2	1–2	1934 FIFA World Cup quarter-finals
9	24	7 October 1934	Hungária körúti stadion, Budapest, Hungary	Austria	1–1	3–1	1933-35 Central European Cup
10	24	7 October 1934	Hungária körúti stadion, Budapest, Hungary	Austria	2–1	3–1	1933-35 Central European Cup
11	25	9 December 1934	San Siro, Milan, Italy	Italy	1–0	2–4	Friendly
12	27	12 May 1935	Üllői úti stadion, Budapest, Hungary	Austria	2–0	6–3	Friendly
13	27	12 May 1935	Üllői úti stadion, Budapest, Hungary	Austria	4–3	6–3	Friendly
14	27	12 May 1935	Üllői úti stadion, Budapest, Hungary	Austria	5–3	6–3	Friendly
15	29	6 October 1935	Praterstadion, Vienna, Austria	Austria	3–2	4–4	1933-35 Central European Cup
16	30	10 November 1935	Üllői úti stadion, Budapest, Hungary	Switzerland	4–0	6–1	Friendly
17	30	10 November 1935	Üllői úti stadion, Budapest, Hungary	Switzerland	5–1	6–1	Friendly
18	31	24 November 1935	Arena Civica, Milan, Italy	Italy	1–0	2–2	1933–35 Central European Cup
19	31	24 November 1935	Arena Civica, Milan, Italy	Italy	2–2	2–2	1933–35 Central European Cup
20	32	15 March 1936	Hungária körúti stadion, Budapest, Hungary	Germany	3–2	3–2	Friendly
21	33	3 May 1936	Hungária körúti stadion, Budapest, Hungary	Irish Free State	1–0	3–3	Friendly
22	33	3 May 1936	Hungária körúti stadion, Budapest, Hungary	Irish Free State	2–2	3–3	Friendly
23	37	11 April 1937	Stadion Rankhof, Basel, Switzerland	Switzerland	1–0	5–1	1936–38 Central European Cup
24	40	19 September 1937	Hungária körúti stadion, Budapest, Hungary	Czechoslovakia	2–2	8–3	1936–38 Central European Cup
25	40	19 September 1937	Hungária körúti stadion, Budapest, Hungary	Czechoslovakia	3–2	8–3	1936–38 Central European Cup
26	40	19 September 1937	Hungária körúti stadion, Budapest, Hungary	Czechoslovakia	4–2	8–3	1936–38 Central European Cup
27	40	19 September 1937	Hungária körúti stadion, Budapest, Hungary	Czechoslovakia	5–2	8–3	1936–38 Central European Cup
28	40	19 September 1937	Hungária körúti stadion, Budapest, Hungary	Czechoslovakia	6–3	8–3	1936–38 Central European Cup
29	40	19 September 1937	Hungária körúti stadion, Budapest, Hungary	Czechoslovakia	7–3	8–3	1936–38 Central European Cup
30	40	19 September 1937	Hungária körúti stadion, Budapest, Hungary	Czechoslovakia	8–3	8–3	1936–38 Central European Cup
31	41	10 October 1937	Praterstadion, Vienna, Austria	Austria	1–0	2–1	1936–38 Central European Cup
32	42	14 November 1937	Üllői úti stadion, Budapest, Hungary	Switzerland	1–0	2–0	1936–38 Central European Cup
33	43	5 June 1938	Stade Municipal Velodrome, Reims, France	Dutch East Indies	3–0	6–0	1938 FIFA World Cup round of 16
34	43	5 June 1938	Stade Municipal Velodrome, Reims, France	Dutch East Indies	6–0	6–0	1938 FIFA World Cup round of 16
35	44	12 June 1938	Stade Victor Boucquey, Lille, France	Switzerland	1–0	2–0	1938 FIFA World Cup quarter-finals
36	45	16 June 1938	Parc des Princes, Paris, France	Sweden	4–1	5–1	1938 FIFA World Cup semi-finals
37	46	19 June 1938	Stade Olympique de Colombes, Paris, France	Italy	2–3	2–4	1938 FIFA World Cup Final
38	47	7 December 1938	Ibrox Stadium, Glasgow, Scotland	Scotland	1–3	1–3	Friendly
39	54	12 November 1939	Beogradski SK Stadium, Belgrade, Yugoslavia	Yugoslavia	1–0	2–0	Friendly
40	55	31 March 1940	Üllői úti stadion, Budapest, Hungary	Switzerland	1–0	3–0	Friendly
41	55	31 March 1940	Üllői úti stadion, Budapest, Hungary	Switzerland	3–0	3–0	Friendly
42	57	19 May 1940	Üllői úti stadion, Budapest, Hungary	Romania	1–0	2–0	1940-41 Danube Cup

== Honours ==
=== Player ===
==== Club ====
Ferencváros

- Hungarian National Championship (5): 1932, 1934, 1938, 1940, 1941
- Hungarian Cup (4): 1933, 1942, 1943, 1944
- Mitropa Cup (1): 1937

==== International ====
Hungary

- FIFA World Cup runner-up: 1938
- Central European International Cup third place: 1931–32, 1933–35

=== Manager ===
==== Club ====
Juventus

- Serie A: 1951–52

==== Individual ====
- FIFA World Cup Bronze Ball: 1938
- FIFA World Cup Bronze Boot: 1938
- FIFA World Cup All-Star Team: 1938
- Central European International Cup: Top scorer 1933–35
- World Soccer: The 100 Greatest Footballers of All Time
- Mitropa Cup top scorer: 1935, 1937, 1940
- Nemzeti Bajnokság I top scorer: 1935–36, 1939–40, 1940–41
- Nemzeti Bajnokság I unofficial top scorer: 1944

== See also ==
- List of men's footballers with 500 or more goals
- The 100 Greatest Players of the 20th Century
- List of one-club men in association football
- List of FIFA World Cup top goalscorers
