= Gyula Zsengellér =

Hungarian footballer and manager (1915–1999)

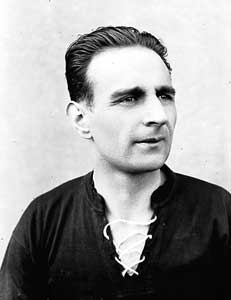
- Gyula Zsengellér

Personal information
- Full name: Gyula Zsengellér
- Date of birth: 27 December 1915
- Place of birth: Cegléd, Kingdom of Hungary, Austria-Hungary
- Date of death: 29 March 1999 (aged 83)
- Place of death: Nicosia, Cyprus
- Height: 1.77 m (5 ft 9 1/2 in)
- Position: Striker

Senior career*
Years	Team	Apps	(Gls)
1935–1936	Salgótarjáni TC	24	(19)
1936–1947	Újpest FC	301	(368)
1947–1949	A.S. Roma	34	(6)
1949–1950	AC Ancona	30	(18)
1951–1953	Deportivo Samarios	37	(23)
Total		426	(434)

International career
1936–1947	Hungary	39	(32)

Managerial career
- 1950: Cosenza
- 1951–1953: Deportivo Samarios (player-manager)
- 1953–1954: Pezoporikos Larnaca
- 1955–1957: Pezoporikos Larnaca
- 1957–1959: Nea Salamis FC
- 1959–1960: Cosenza
- 1960–1961: Pezoporikos Larnaca
- 1961–1962: Salernitana
- 1962–1964: US Sarom Ravenna
- 1964–1965: Apollon Kalamarias
- 1965–1966: APOEL FC
- 1966–1968: Pezoporikos Larnaca
- 1968–1969: Niki Volos
- 1969–1970: Anorthosis Famagusta
- 1970: Pezoporikos Larnaca
- 1970–1971: Cosenza (assistant)
- 1971–1972: Niki Volos
- 1972–1974: Olympiacos Volos
- 1974–1976: APOEL FC
- 1976–1979: APOP Paphos
Medal record
Representing Hungary
FIFA World Cup
Runner-up	1938 France
- * Club domestic league appearances and goals

Gyula Zsengellér (27 December 1915 – 29 March 1999) was a Hungarian footballer who played as a striker. A historic player of Újpest FC, he scored 387 goals in the Hungarian league between 1935 and 1947, making him the league's third-highest goalscorer of all-time. He was also a member of the Hungary national team that reached the final of the 1938 FIFA World Cup, being the tournament's second-highest scorer. Zsengellér also was the last surviving player of the Hungarian side that played the 1938 World Cup final.

After finishing his playing career, he worked as a coach for several clubs in Italy and Cyprus, guiding Pezoporikos Larnaca to a championship title and APOEL FC to a cup.

== Club career ==
He was a world-class striker. He was an outstanding player technically, tactically, in terms of game intelligence and goal-scoring ability. He was not a physically strong player, he avoided body-to-body play, but he always put his teammates in good positions. A two-footed player.

— Zsengellér as described in the 1968 book Alberttől Zsákig, written by Zoltán Antal and József Hoffer.

Born in Cegléd on 27 December 1915, Zsengellér began his career at Salgótarjáni TC, before joining Újpest FC in 1936, with whom he played for 11 years, until 1947. During his time there, he was the Hungarian league's top-scorer in five seasons (1938, 1939, 1943, 1944 and in the spring season of 1945), Europe's top goalscorer in 1939 and 1945 (56 and 36 goals, respectively), and also the top scorer of the Mitropa Cup in 1939 with 9 goals, including a brace in the first leg of the finals against Ferencvárosi, helping his side to a 6–3 aggregate victory. In total, he scored 368 goals in 302 league matches.

In 1947, Zsengellér left both Újpest and the country, becoming the last player that the Hungarian Football Federation allowed to sign a contract abroad, joining Italian side A.S. Roma, where he stayed for two years. In the 1949–50 season, he played for Ancona, before finishing his career playing for Colombian Deportivo Samarios, where he worked as a player-coach between 1951 and 1953. According to IFFHS, he is the fifth highest goalscorer in the history of top-tier national leagues with 415 such goals (386 in Hungary, 6 in Italy, and 23 in Colombia), only behind Lionel Messi, Josef Bican, Ferenc Puskás, and Cristiano Ronaldo.

== International career ==
On 2 December 1936, the 20-year-old Zsengellér made his international debut for Hungary in a friendly against England at Arsenal Stadium in London, which ended in a 6–2 loss. In his second appearance, on 11 April 1937, he scored a hat-trick in a 1936–38 Central European Cup match against Switzerland in Basel. The following year, on 25 March, he scored a 5-goal haul in a 1938 World Cup qualifier against Greece (11–1). In total, he earned 39 caps, scoring 33 goals, making him the eighth-highest goalscorer in the history of the Hungarian national team.

== Managerial career ==
After his retirement, Zsengellér started a long and successful managerial career, working mainly in Italy and Cyprus, winning the Cypriot First Division with Pezoporikos Larnaca in 1954 and the Cypriot Cup with APOEL FC in 1976. In 1958, he was appointed as the manager of the Cypriot national team, a position he held for two years.

== Death and legacy ==
Zsengellér died on 29 March 1999, at the age of 83. He was initially buried in Cyprus, where his grave stood until October 2013, when his family brought his remains to Hungary and reburied them in his hometown of Cegléd. His son Zsolt was a sports journalist and former employee of Képes Sport.

A Turkish newspaper described him as the Paganini of football.

== Career statistics ==
=== Club statistics ===
Club performance			League		Cup		League Cup		Continental		Total	
Season	Club	League	Apps	Goals	Apps	Goals	Apps	Goals	Apps	Goals	Apps	Goals
Hungary			League		Hungarian Cup		League Cup		Europe		Total	
1935–36	Salgótarjáni BTC	National Championship I	24	19								
1936–37	Újpest Budapest	National Championship I	24	35								
1937–38	Újpest Budapest	National Championship I	25	31								
1938–39	Újpest Budapest	National Championship I	26	56								
1939–40	Újpest Budapest	National Championship I	12	11								
1940–41	Újpest Budapest	National Championship I	26	28								
1941–42	Újpest Budapest	National Championship I	28	27								
1942–43	Újpest Budapest	National Championship I	30	26								
1943–44	Újpest Budapest	National Championship I	29	33								
1944	Újpest Budapest	National Championship I	9	12								
1945	Újpest Budapest	National Championship I	21	36								
1945–46	Újpest Budapest	National Championship I	35	51								
1946–47	Újpest Budapest	National Championship I	29	18								
1947–48	Újpest Budapest	National Championship I	7	4								
Total	Hungary		325	387								
1948–49	AS Roma	Serie A	28	5								
1949–50	AS Roma	Serie A	6	1								
Total	Italy		34	6								
1951	Deportivo Samarios	Categoría Primera A	19	13								
1952	Deportivo Samarios	Categoría Primera A	18	10								
Total	Colombia		37	23								
Career total			396	416								

=== International goals ===
Hungary score listed first, score column indicates score after each Zsengellér goal.

List of international goals scored by Gyula Zsengellér
No.	Date	Venue	Opponent	Score	Result	Competition
1	11 April 1937	Stadion Rankhof, Basel, Switzerland	Switzerland	2–0	5–1	1936–38 Central European Cup
2	11 April 1937	Stadion Rankhof, Basel, Switzerland	Switzerland	3–1	5–1	1936–38 Central European Cup
3	11 April 1937	Stadion Rankhof, Basel, Switzerland	Switzerland	4–1	5–1	1936–38 Central European Cup
4	19 September 1937	Hungaria uti, Budapest, Hungary	Czech Republic	1–0	8–3	1936–38 Central European Cup
5	16 January 1938	Stade Municipal, Luxembourg City, Luxembourg	Luxembourg	4–0	6–0	Friendly
6	25 March 1938	Hungária körúti stadion, Budapest, Hungary	Greece	1–0	11–1	1938 FIFA World Cup qualification
7	25 March 1938	Hungária körúti stadion, Budapest, Hungary	Greece	3–0	11–1	1938 FIFA World Cup qualification
8	25 March 1938	Hungária körúti stadion, Budapest, Hungary	Greece	4–0	11–1	1938 FIFA World Cup qualification
9	25 March 1938	Hungária körúti stadion, Budapest, Hungary	Greece	10–0	11–1	1938 FIFA World Cup qualification
10	25 March 1938	Hungária körúti stadion, Budapest, Hungary	Greece	11–0	11–1	1938 FIFA World Cup qualification
11	5 June 1938	Vélodrome Municipal, Reims, France	Dutch East Indies	4–0	6–0	1938 World Cup Round of 16
12	5 June 1938	Vélodrome Municipal, Reims, France	Dutch East Indies	5–0	6–0	1938 World Cup Round of 16
13	12 June 1938	Stade Victor Boucquey, Lille, France	Switzerland	2–0	2–0	1938 World Cup quarter-finals
14	16 June 1938	Parc des Princes, Paris, France	Sweden	3–1	5–1	1938 World Cup Semi-finals
15	16 June 1938	Parc des Princes, Paris, France	Sweden	5–1	5–1	1938 World Cup Semi-finals
16	26 February 1939	Rotterdam, Netherlands	Netherlands	1–0	2–3	Friendly
17	19 March 1939	Cork, Ireland	(Republic of Ireland) Ireland	1–1	2–2	Friendly
18	27 August 1939	Polish Army Stadium, Warsaw, Poland	Poland	1–0	2–4	Friendly
19	24 September 1939	Üllői úti stadion, Budapest, Hungary	Germany	2–0	5–1	Friendly
20	24 September 1939	Üllői úti stadion, Budapest, Hungary	Germany	3–1	5–1	Friendly
21	24 September 1939	Üllői úti stadion, Budapest, Hungary	Germany	4–1	5–1	Friendly
22	3 May 1942	Üllői úti stadion, Budapest, Hungary	Germany	2–1	5–3	Friendly
23	16 May 1943	Geneva, Hungary	Switzerland	2–1	3–1	Friendly
24	6 June 1943	Yunak Stadium, Sofia, Bulgaria	Bulgaria	1–0	4–2	Friendly
25	6 June 1943	Yunak Stadium, Sofia, Bulgaria	Bulgaria	2–0	4–2	Friendly
26	6 June 1943	Yunak Stadium, Sofia, Bulgaria	Bulgaria	3–0	4–2	Friendly
27	6 June 1943	Yunak Stadium, Sofia, Bulgaria	Bulgaria	4–1	4–2	Friendly
28	12 September 1943	Solna, Sweden	Sweden	1–1	3–2	Friendly
29	19 August 1945	Üllői úti stadion, Budapest, Hungary	Austria	2–0	2–0	Friendly
30	20 August 1945	Üllői úti stadion, Budapest, Hungary	Austria	3–0	5–2	Friendly
31	30 September 1945	Üllői úti stadion, Budapest, Hungary	Romania	3–1	7–2	Friendly
32	14 April 1946	Vienna, Austria	Austria	2–1	2–3	Friendly

== Honours ==
=== As a player ===
Újpest

- Nemzeti Bajnokság I
  - Champions (4): 1938–39, 1945, 1945–46, 1946–47
  - Runner-up (3): 1937–38, 1940–41, 1941–42
- Mitropa Cup
  - Champions: 1939

Hungary

- Balkan Cup
  - Champions: 1947
- Central European International Cup
  - Champions: 1936–38
- FIFA World Cup
  - Runner-up: 1938

=== As a manager ===
- Cypriot First Division
  - Champions: 1953–54
- Cypriot Cup
  - Champions: 1975–76
- Cypriot Second Division
  - Champions: 1976–77

== See also ==
- List of men's footballers with 500 or more goals
- List of FIFA World Cup top goalscorers
