= List of Nemzeti Bajnokság I managers =

Hungarian football league managers

Managers in the Nemzeti Bajnokság are involved in the day-to-day running of the team, including the training, team selection, and player acquisition. Their influence varies from club-to-club and is related to the ownership of the club and the relationship of the manager with fans. Managers are required to have a UEFA Pro Licence which is the final coaching qualification available, and follows the completion of the UEFA 'B' and 'A' Licences.The UEFA Pro Licence is required by every person who wishes to manage a club in the Nemzeti Bajnokság on a permanent basis.

== Current managers ==
As of 16 November 2026

Name	Nat.	Date of birth	Club	Appointed	Time as manager	Source
György Bognár	(Hungary)	5 November 1961	Paks	14 February 2023	3 years, 275 days	
Gábor Erős	(Hungary)	1 July 1980	Vasas	5 June 2025	1 year, 164 days	
Tamás Bódog	(Hungary)	27 September 1970	Nyíregyháza	29 October 2025	1 year, 18 days	
Zoltán Szélesi	(Hungary)	22 November 1981	Újpest	30 December 2025	321 days	
Balázs Borbély	(Slovakia)	2 October 1979	Ferencváros	1 June 2026	168 days	
Levente Babó	(Hungary)	18 November 1980	Puskás Akadémia	3 June 2026	166 days	
Gert Remmel	(Estonia)	31 December 1975	Debrecen	3 June 2026	166 days	
Maurizio Jacobacci	(Switzerland)	11 January 1963	Kispest Honvéd	6 June 2026	163 days	
Efraín Juárez	(Mexico)	22 February 1988	Győr	17 June 2026	152 days	
Filipe Çelikkaya	(Portugal)	19 January 1985	Zalaegerszeg	22 June 2026	147 days	
Attila Kuttor	(Hungary)	29 May 1970	Kisvárda	9 November 2026	7 days	
Imre Szabics	(Hungary)	22 March 1981	MTK Budapest	16 November 2026	0 days	

== Winning managers ==
As of 16 May 2026

Rank	Manager	Won	Season^{1}
1	(England) Jimmy Hogan	5	1916–17, 1917–18, 1918–19, 1919–20, 1920–21 (MTK)
1	(Hungary) Pál Jávor	5	1942, 1943, 1959 (Csepel), 1945, 1946 (Újpest)
3	(Hungary) Jenő Kalmár	4	1948 (Csepel), 1952, 1954, 1955 (Honvéd)
3	(Hungary) Lajos Baróti	4	1957 (spring) (Vasas), 1969, 1970 (spring), 1970–71 (Újpest)
3	(Hungary) Rudolf Illovszky	4	1960–61, 1961–62, 1965, 1976–77 (Vasas)
3	(Hungary) Pál Várhidi	4	1974, 1975, 1978, 1979 (Újpest)
7	(Hungary) Döme Fronz	3	1923, 1924, 1925 (MTK)
7	(Hungary) István Tóth Potya	3	1927, 1928 (Ferencváros), 1933 (Újpest)
7	(Hungary) Márton Bukovi	3	1951, 1953, 1957–58 (MTK)
7	(Hungary) Dezső Novák	3	1980–81, 1994–95, 1995–96 (Ferencváros)
7	(Hungary) József Verebes	3	1981–82, 1982–83 (Győr), 1986–87 (MTK)
7	(Hungary) Imre Komora	3	1983–84, 1984–85, 1985–86 (Honvéd)
7	(Hungary) Sándor Egervári	3	1998–99, 2002–03 (MTK), 1999–00 (Dunaújváros)
7	(Ukraine) Serhii Rebrov	3	2018–19, 2019–20, 2020–21 (Ferencváros)
15	(Hungary) Attila Supka	2	2004–05, 2005–06, (Debrecen)
15	(Hungary) Sándor Kertész	2	1904 (MTK Budapest), 1905 (Ferencváros)
15	(Hungary) Lajos Bányai	2	1929–30, 1930–31 (Újpest)
15	(Hungary) Zoltán Blum	2	1931–32, 1933–34 (Ferencváros)
15	(Hungary) Béla Guttmann	2	1938–39, 1946–47 (Újpest)
15	(Hungary) Lajos Dimény	2	1940, 1941 (Ferencváros)
15	(Hungary) Ferenc Puskás Sr.	2	1949–50, 1950 (Honvéd)
15	(Hungary) József Mészáros	2	1962–63, 1964 (Ferencváros)
15	(Hungary) Károly Lakat	2	1967, 1968 (Ferencváros)
15	(Hungary) Imre Kovács	2	1972, 1973 (Újpest)
15	(Hungary) György Mezey	2	1991 (Honvéd), 2011 (Fehérvár as Videoton)
15	(Hungary) János Csank	2	1994 (Vác), 2001 (Ferencváros)
15	(Hungary) József Garami	2	1997, 2008 (MTK Budapest)
15	(Hungary) András Herczeg	2	2009, 2010 (Debrecen)
15	(Hungary) Alfréd Schaffer	2	1936, 1937 (MTK Budapest)
15	(Hungary) Attila Pintér	2	2004 (Ferencváros), 2013 (Győr)
15	(Hungary) Elemér Kondás	2	2012, 2014 (Debrecen)
15	(Russia) Stanislav Cherchesov	2	2021–22, 2022–23 (Ferencváros)
33	(Hungary) Hugó Szüsz	1	1908 (MTK Budapest)
33	(England) Holmes W	1	1914 (MTK Budapest)
33	(England) Herbert Burgess	1	1921–22 (MTK Budapest)
33	(Hungary) Sándor Bródy	1	1926 (Ferencváros)
33	(Hungary) Béla Révész	1	1929 (MTK Budapest)
33	(Hungary) Béla Jánosi	1	1934–35 (Újpest)
33	(Hungary) Emil Rauchmaul	1	1938 (Ferencváros)
33	(Hungary) Ferenc Rónay	1	1943–44 (Nagyvárad)
33	(Hungary) Antal Lyka	1	1948–49 (Ferencváros)
33	(Hungary) Gyula Szűcs	1	1959–60 (Újpest)
33	(Hungary) Nándor Hidegkuti	1	1963 (Győr)
33	(Hungary) Lajos Csordás	1	1966 (Vasas Budapest)
33	(Hungary) Jenő Dalnoki	1	1975–76 (Ferencváros)
33	(Hungary) Lajos Tichy	1	1979–80 (Budapest Honvéd)
33	(Hungary) Bertalan Bicskei	1	1987–88 (Budapest Honvéd)
33	(Hungary) József Both	1	1988–89 (Budapest Honvéd)
33	(Hungary) István Varga	1	1989–90 (Újpest)
33	(Hungary) Tibor Nyilasi	1	1991–92 (Ferencváros)
33	(Finland) Martti Kuusela	1	1992–93 (Budapest Honvéd)
33	(Hungary) Péter Várhidi	1	1997–98 (Újpest)
33	(Hungary) Péter Bozsik	1	2001–02 (Zalaegerszeg)
33	(Czech Republic) Miroslav Beránek	1	2006–07 (Debrecen)
33	(Spain) Joan Carrillo Milán	1	2014–15 (Videoton)
33	(Germany) Thomas Doll	1	2015–16 (Ferencváros)
33	(Italy) Marco Rossi	1	2016–17 (Honvéd)
33	(Serbia) Marko Nikolić	1	2017–18 (Fehérvár as Videoton)
33	(Serbia) Dejan Stanković	1	2023–24 (Ferencváros)
33	(Republic of Ireland) Robbie Keane	1	2024–25 (Ferencváros)
33	(Slovakia) Balázs Borbély	1	2025–26 (Győr)

Notes

- Note 1: For the seasons 1901, 1902 (won by Budapesti TC) 1903, 1906–07, 1908–09, 1909–10, 1910–11, 1911–12, 1912–13 (won by Ferencváros) managers are not included in the ranking since they are unknown.
