= Sándor Pázmándy =

Hungarian footballer

Personal information
- Date of birth: 16 March 1912
- Place of birth: Vecsés, Austria-Hungary
- Date of death: 17 February 1989 (aged 76)
- Position: Midfielder

Senior career*
Years	Team	Apps	(Gls)
1928–1935	Budapest SE		
1935–1936	Budapesti TC		
1936–1944	Elektromos FC		
1944–1947	Herminamezei AC		
1947–1948	Elektromos FC		

International career
1938–1942	Hungary	3	(0)

Managerial career
- 1960–1965: AS Marsa
- 1966–1968: Espérance
- * Club domestic league appearances and goals

Sándor Pázmándy (16 March 1912 – 17 February 1989) was a Hungarian football midfielder.
