= Ferenc Szusza =

Hungarian footballer

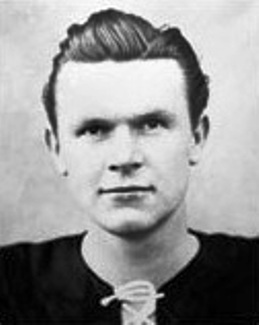
- Szusza in 1952

Personal information
- Full name: Ferenc Szusza
- Date of birth: 1 December 1923
- Place of birth: Budapest, Kingdom of Hungary
- Date of death: 1 August 2006 (aged 82)
- Place of death: Budapest, Hungary
- Height: 1.78 m (5 ft 10 in)
- Position: Forward

Senior career*
Years	Team	Apps	(Gls)
1941–1960	Újpesti Dózsa	462	(393)

International career
1942–1956	Hungary	24	(18)

Managerial career
- 1962–1964: Győri ETO
- 1963–1965: Újpest
- 1966–1968: Győri ETO
- 1970–1971: Gornik Zabrze
- 1971–1976: Real Betis
- 1978–1979: Atlético Madrid
- 1980–1981: Újpest
- * Club domestic league appearances and goals

Ferenc Szusza (1 December 1923 – 1 August 2006) was a Hungarian footballer who played as a forward. He was a top division player for Újpest from 1941 to 1960. He made 24 appearances for the Hungary national team and was a four-time champion with Újpest.

== Career ==
As of 2021, Szusza was the all-time second-top scorer in Hungary's top division, and the 11th highest among all top division players in the world.

Szusza played for Hungary, but was a surprise omission from the side that won gold at the 1952 Summer Olympics. He was disciplined by then manager Gusztáv Sebes after an incident following a match against the Soviet Union in Moscow in May 1952. Szusza would only make one further appearance for Hungary, in 1956.

After his football career, Szusza became a manager. He coached Győri ETO, Újpesti Dózsa, Górnik Zabrze, Real Betis and Atlético Madrid.

== Career statistics ==
Club	Season	League			National Cup		Total	
Club	Season	Division	Apps	Goals	Apps	Goals	Apps	Goals
Újpest FC	1940–41	Nemzeti Bajnokság I	12	14			12	14
Újpest FC	1941–42	Nemzeti Bajnokság I	29	21			29	21
Újpest FC	1942–43	Nemzeti Bajnokság I	29	20		3	29	23
Újpest FC	1943–44	Nemzeti Bajnokság I	30	23			30	23
Újpest FC	1944	Nemzeti Bajnokság I	12	6			12	6
Újpest FC	1945	Nemzeti Bajnokság I	21	35			21	35
Újpest FC	1945–46	Nemzeti Bajnokság I	33	45			33	45
Újpest FC	1946–47	Nemzeti Bajnokság I	28	19		1	28	20
Újpest FC	1947–48	Nemzeti Bajnokság I	24	27			24	27
Újpest FC	1948–49	Nemzeti Bajnokság I	28	36			28	36
Újpest FC	1949–50	Nemzeti Bajnokság I	18	12			18	12
Újpest FC	1950	Nemzeti Bajnokság I	8	4		1	8	5
Újpest FC	1951	Nemzeti Bajnokság I	26	22			26	22
Újpest FC	1952	Nemzeti Bajnokság I	26	19			26	19
Újpest FC	1953	Nemzeti Bajnokság I	14	17			14	17
Újpest FC	1954	Nemzeti Bajnokság I	20	16			20	16
Újpest FC	1955	Nemzeti Bajnokság I	21	17			21	17
Újpest FC	1956	Nemzeti Bajnokság I	22	14			22	14
Újpest FC	1957	Nemzeti Bajnokság I	5	5			5	5
Újpest FC	1957–58	Nemzeti Bajnokság I	14	4			14	4
Újpest FC	1958–59	Nemzeti Bajnokság I	13	9			13	9
Újpest FC	1959–60	Nemzeti Bajnokság I	22	15			22	15
Újpest FC	1960–61	Nemzeti Bajnokság I	6	3			6	3
Total			462	393		5		398

== Legacy ==
Újpest FC's stadium, Szusza Ferenc Stadium, is named after Szusza.

== Honours ==
=== Player ===
Újpest

- Nemzeti Bajnokság I: 1945 Spring, 1945–46, 1946–47, 1959–60

Hungary

- Balkan Cup: 1947

Individual

- Hungarian Football Federation Player of the Year: 1947

=== Manager ===
Raba ETO Gyor

- Nemzeti Bajnokság I: 1963
- Magyar Kupa: 1966, 1967

Górnik Zabrze

- Ekstraklasa: 1970–71
- Polish Cup: 1970–71

== See also ==
- List of men's footballers with 500 or more goals
