= 1946–47 Nemzeti Bajnokság II =

Nemzeti Bajnokság II
- Season: 1946–47
- Champions: MOGÜRT SC (West); Erzsébeti MTK (Central); MATEOSz Munkás SE (East); Elektromos Munkás SE (South)
- Promoted: MOGÜRT SC (West); Erzsébeti MTK (Central); Salgótarjáni BTC (Central); MATEOSz Munkás SE (East); Elektromos Munkás SE (South)
- Relegated: (West); (Central) (East) (South)

The 1946–47 Nemzeti Bajnokság II was the 47th season of the Nemzeti Bajnokság II, the second tier of the Hungarian football league.

== League table ==
=== Western group ===
Pos	Team	Pld	W	D	L	GF	GA	GD	Pts	Promotion or relegation
1	MOGÜRT SC (Note: Formerly known as Zuglói MaDISz.)	26	19	4	3	81	29	+52	42	Promotion to Nemzeti Bajnokság I
2	Pécsi Dinamó Villamostelepi AC (Note: Formerly known as Dunagőzhajózási Villamostelepi Atlétikai Club.)	26	16	5	5	85	41	+44	37	
3	Kaposvári MTE	26	15	3	8	53	46	+7	33	
4	MÁV DAC	26	14	4	8	68	37	+31	32	
5	Pécsi Vasutas SK	26	13	5	8	70	41	+29	31	
6	Kistext SE	26	13	4	9	49	31	+18	30	
7	Soproni VSE	26	11	6	9	45	51	−6	28	
8	Tatabányai SC	26	9	6	11	48	42	+6	24	
9	Szombathelyi AK Barátság	26	9	4	13	39	57	−18	22	
10	Székesfehérvári MÁV Előre	26	9	3	14	46	64	−18	21	
11	Nagykanizsai VTE	26	7	6	13	47	53	−6	20	
12	Dombóvári VSE	26	7	3	16	33	60	−27	17	Relegation
13	Budapesti Partizán SC (Note: Formerly known as IX. ker. Dózsa MaDISz.)	26	6	2	18	29	85	−56	14	Relegation
14	Székesfehérvári TC	26	5	3	18	40	96	−56	13	Relegation

=== Central group ===
Pos	Team	Pld	W	D	L	GF	GA	GD	Pts	Promotion or relegation
1	Erzsébeti MTK	26	20	5	1	112	28	+84	45	Promotion to Nemzeti Bajnokság I
2	Salgótarjáni BTC	26	21	3	2	90	24	+66	45	Promotion to Nemzeti Bajnokság I
3	Salgótarjáni SE	26	17	4	5	76	27	+49	38	
4	Budafoki MTE	26	14	4	8	68	45	+23	32	
5	Ceglédi VSE	26	13	5	8	48	46	+2	31	
6	III. ker. TVE (Note: Formerly known as III. ker. MaDISz TVE.)	26	12	3	11	46	51	−5	27	
7	Szolnoki MTE	26	11	4	11	44	60	−16	26	
8	Újpesti MTE	26	9	7	10	54	43	+11	25	
9	Váci SE	26	11	2	13	51	64	−13	24	
10	Zugló-Herminamezei AC (Note: Formerly known as Herminamezei AC.)	26	8	6	12	53	61	−8	22	
11	Ferencvárosi SE	26	8	2	16	46	71	−25	18	
12	Salgóbányai FC	26	6	3	17	28	72	−44	15	Relegation
13	Kőbányai Barátság (Note: On 9 April 1947, withdrew, merger with SzAC Barátságba.)	26	2	5	19	25	56	−31	9	Relegation
14	Érdi MÁV (Note: Deleted.)	0	0	0	0	0	0	0	0	Relegation

=== Eastern group ===
Pos	Team	Pld	W	D	L	GF	GA	GD	Pts	Promotion or relegation
1	MATEOSz Munkás SE (Note: Formerly known as Budai Munkás SE.)	26	22	2	2	113	20	+93	46	Promotion to Nemzeti Bajnokság I
2	Diósgyőri VTK	26	20	4	2	88	23	+65	44	
3	Ózdi VTK	26	15	3	8	50	34	+16	33	
4	Miskolci MTE	26	13	5	8	44	39	+5	31	
5	Magyar Textil SE	26	12	4	10	47	43	+4	28	
6	Goldberger SE	26	12	4	10	50	54	−4	28	
7	Előre SE	26	11	5	10	38	49	−11	27	
8	Vasutas Előre SC	26	12	2	12	37	44	−7	26	
9	Nyíregyházi MADISz	26	9	8	9	30	48	−18	26	
10	Törekvés SE	26	11	3	12	54	42	+12	25	
11	Nyíregyházi MÁV SE	26	10	3	13	37	64	−27	23	
12	Kisterenyei Bányatelepi SE	26	9	2	15	34	84	−50	20	Relegation
13	Debreceni MÁV Bocskai (Note: Withdrew, merger with Debreceni KaSE, new name Debreceni MÁV KaSE.)	26	1	2	23	10	66	−56	4	Relegation
14	Debreceni MTE (Note: Withdrew.)	26	1	1	24	1	23	−22	3	Relegation

=== Southern group ===
Pos	Team	Pld	W	D	L	GF	GA	GD	Pts	Promotion or relegation
1	Elektromos Munkás SE	26	22	1	3	105	26	+79	45	Promotion to Nemzeti Bajnokság I
2	Békéscsabai Előre MTE (Note: Formerly known as Békéscsabai Törekvés MTE.)	26	21	3	2	81	23	+58	45	
3	Wolfner SE	26	13	3	10	48	38	+10	29	
4	Makói Vasutas SE	26	13	3	10	47	39	+8	29	
5	Postás SE	26	12	5	9	49	44	+5	29	
6	Tisza Vasutas SE (Szeged)	26	12	4	10	50	33	+17	28	
7	Ganz TE	26	13	2	11	54	48	+6	28	
8	Gyulai TE	26	11	3	12	43	55	−12	25	
9	Szegedi MTE	26	11	1	14	47	58	−11	23	
10	Kecskeméti AC	26	7	7	12	50	64	−14	21	
11	Kecskeméti MTE	26	9	3	14	48	64	−16	21	
12	Kőbányai Polgári Serfőző SE	26	7	4	15	38	66	−28	18	Relegation
13	Békéscsabai MÁV SE	26	5	3	18	28	64	−36	13	Relegation
14	Kondorosi TE	26	4	2	20	29	95	−66	10	Relegation

== See also ==
- 1946–47 Nemzeti Bajnokság I
