= 1945–46 Nemzeti Bajnokság I =

Nemzeti Bajnokság I
- Season: 1945–46
- Champions: Újpest FC

Final standings of the 1945–46 Hungarian League season. With an average attendance of 11,333, Ferencváros recorded the highest average home league attendance.

== Preliminary round ==
=== Eastern Group ===
==== Table ====
Pos	Team	Pld	W	D	L	GF	GA	GR	Pts	Qualification or relegation
1	Újpesti TE	26	26	0	0	147	29	5.069	52	Play-off
2	Vasas SC	26	18	2	6	86	49	1.755	38	Play-off
3	Szegedi AK	26	16	5	5	69	46	1.500	37	Play-off
4	Kispest	26	12	5	9	66	44	1.500	29	Play-off
5	Debreceni VSC	26	12	5	9	62	48	1.292	29	Play-off
6	Diósgyőri VTK	26	9	11	6	43	50	0.860	29	Relegation round
7	Soroksár FC	26	13	3	10	59	69	0.855	29	Relegation round
8	Salgótarjáni BTC	26	9	5	12	56	61	0.918	23	Relegation round
9	Elektromos FC	26	9	4	13	54	62	0.871	22	Relegation round
10	Zuglói MADISZ	26	8	5	13	59	63	0.937	21	Relegation round
11	Herminamezei AC	26	9	3	14	53	66	0.803	21	Relegated to NB II
12	Békéscsabai Előre	26	5	5	16	41	80	0.513	15	Relegated to NB II
13	Budai Barátság	26	5	4	17	39	72	0.542	14	Relegated to NB II
14	Törekvés SE	26	1	3	22	12	104	0.115	5	Relegated to NB II

Source: rsssf.com

==== Results ====
Home \ Away	BÉK	BUD	DEB	DIÓ	ELE	HER	KIS	SAL	SOR	SZE	TÖR	ÚJP	VAS	ZUG
Békéscsabai Előre		+:- (Note: The match was settled with a goalless win.)	1–6	1–1	1–5	1–1	0–2	6–2	2–2	2–4	5–1	0–11	2–6	4–0
Budai Barátság	3–2		1–3	1–3	2–4	1–3	0–3	2–1	2–2	4–7	1–1	2–7	2–3	3–2
Debrecen	6–3	2–1		4–0	2–1	1–0	0–1	0–0	2–3	1–4	0–0	1–4	1–2	1–0
Diósgyőr	1–1	3–1	3–2		1–1	3–2	1–1	1–0	0–5	1–1	3–0	3–4	3–2	2–2
Elektromos	1–1	4–2	2–3	3–4		3–2	4–3	1–4	1–6	1–4	4–0	2–4	0–1	2–3
Herminamezei	4–1	3–2	4–4	0–0	2–3		2–3	4–3	4–0	2–4	2–0	1–9	2–5	2–0
Kispest	5–1	2–2	1–2	1–1	4–0	4–0		0–1	3–2	6–0	7–0	1–5	3–3	2–3
Salgótarján	3–2	2–3	2–4	4–0	0–0	6–1	2–3		2–2	1–1	1–0	2–3	2–6	5–4
Soroksár	3–1	1–0	2–1	1–5	1–0	2–1	5–3	4–2		0–1	4–1	0–6	3–8	4–5
Szegedi AK	2–1	0–0	4–1	1–1	2–1	2–5	2–0	2–2	3–1		3–1	2–4	1–3	2–1
Törekvés	0–1	0–3	1–8	1–1	0–8	0–2	0–5	2–1	1–2	2–9		0–7	0–6	1–3
Újpest	5–0	10–0	4–3	4–0	10–0	3–2	2–0	9–1	9–2	5–0	5–0		3–1	3–2
Vasas	3–1	1–0	3–3	5–0	0–3	4–2	3–0	0–2	6–1	0–5	2–0	2–7		6–1
Zuglói MADISZ	3–1	3–1	1–1	2–2	0–0	2–0	3–3	4–5	0–1	0–3	11–0	2–4	2–5	

Source: rsssf.com
Legend: Blue = home team win; Yellow = draw; Red = away team win.

=== Western Group ===
==== Table ====
Pos	Team	Pld	W	D	L	GF	GA	GR	Pts	Qualification or relegation
1	FTC	26	22	1	3	99	31	3.194	45	Play-off
2	Csepel	26	16	5	5	82	43	1.907	37	Play-off
3	MTK	26	14	6	6	74	47	1.574	34	Play-off
4	Szentlőrinci AC	26	13	4	9	96	72	1.333	30	Play-off
5	Haladás	26	12	5	9	67	42	1.595	29	Play-off
6	Győri ETO	26	12	5	9	55	47	1.170	29	Relegation round
7	Pécsi Vasutas SK	26	12	4	10	75	55	1.364	28	Relegation round
8	Kőbányai Barátság	26	11	3	12	73	75	0.973	25	Relegation round
9	Dorogi Bányász	26	10	5	11	66	79	0.835	25	Relegation round
10	Szolnoki MÁV	26	7	10	9	49	46	1.065	24	Relegation round
11	Újpesti MTE	26	8	4	14	36	52	0.692	20	Relegated to NB II
12	Erzsébeti MTK	26	8	4	14	48	71	0.676	20	Relegated to NB II
13	Budafoki LC	26	5	5	16	41	97	0.423	15	Relegated to NB II
14	Dózsa MaDISz TE	26	1	1	24	30	134	0.224	3	Relegated to NB II

Source: rsssf.com

==== Results ====
Home \ Away	BUD	CSE	DOR	DÓZ	ERZ	FTC	GYŐ	HAL	KŐB	MTK	PÉC	SZT	SZO	ÚMT
Budafok		3–10	2–3	3–1	3–2	2–5	2–2	0–5	+:- (Note: The match was settled with a goalless win.)	3–3	1–6	4–2	0–4	3–3
Csepel	5–1		2–0	4–0	5–1	1–0	4–4	5–0	2–3	3–2	1–2	4–4	0–0	4–0
Dorogi Bányász	2–2	5–8		4–2	1–4	1–3	3–1	3–3	3–7	0–5	1–3	4–4	4–2	1–0
Dózsa MaDISz	5–1	1–2	0–9		1–6	0–11	1–1	0–5	2–8	1–5	2–12	2–6	1–2	1–7
Erzsébet	2–1	1–3	2–4	7–4		2–7	0–0	0–6	3–4	4–5	0–5	1–4	0–3	2–0
Ferencváros	6–2	2–4	8–2	6–0	+:-		2–0	2–2	6–1	3–0	4–1	3–7	2–1	1–0
Győr	4–0	4–1	1–2	+:-	1–1	0–6		2–1	2–4	1–3	5–2	1–2	4–1	0–3
Haladás	6–0	2–1	3–1	4–1	4–1	1–2	0–2		2–0	2–0	3–1	2–3	1–1	0–0
Kőbányai Barátság	3–3	1–2	4–5	7–0	5–1	1–2	0–6	2–1		-:+	2–5	0–13	1–1	8–1
MTK Budapest	5–1	2–2	0–0	3–2	1–1	0–1	1–5	6–4	5–2		3–0	2–2	4–4	4–0
Pécsi Vasutas	5–2	0–3	0–2	13–2	0–0	0–3	4–1	2–1	1–3	2–5		4–2	1–1	2–0
Szentlőrinc	5–0	2–4	5–3	3–1	1–2	2–7	1–3	2–7	3–4	4–2	6–2		6–4	5–2
Szolnoki	1–2	2–2	6–1	2–0	3–4	0–2	1–2	1–1	3–3	0–1	2–2	2–2		1–0
Újpesti MTE	2–0	1–0	2–2	3–0	0–1	1–5	2–3	4–1	3–0	0–7	0–0	2–0	0–1	

Source: rsssf.com
Legend: Blue = home team win; Yellow = draw; Red = away team win.

== Final round ==
=== Play-off ===
1945–46 play-off competition of places 1–5 of both competitions (matches against teams in "own" class not played anymore, results of these matches copied from original competition).

==== Table ====
Pos	Team	Pld	W	D	L	GF	GA	GR	Pts	
1	Újpesti TE	18	14	3	1	71	23	3.087	31	Champions
2	Vasas SC	18	11	2	5	41	37	1.108	24	
3	Csepel SC	18	9	2	7	60	59	1.017	20	
4	Szegedi AK	18	8	1	9	47	47	1.000	17	
5	Ferencvárosi TC	18	6	4	8	39	41	0.951	16	
6	MTK Budapest FC	18	6	3	9	45	46	0.978	15	
7	Debreceni VSC	18	7	1	10	39	55	0.709	15	
8	Szentlőrinci AC	18	6	3	9	50	75	0.667	15	
9	Kispest	18	6	2	10	39	50	0.780	14	
10	Haladás	18	6	1	11	29	27	1.074	13	

Source: rsssf.com

==== Results ====
Home \ Away	CSE	DEB	FTC	HAL	KIS	MTK	SZE	SZT	ÚJP	VAS
Csepel		5–7			4–5		6–4		1–4	1–4
Debrecen	1–4		0–1	+:- (Note: The match was settled with a goalless win.)		5–4		5–9		
Ferencváros		1–2			2–2		2–3		1–1	2–4
Haladás		-:+			-:+		-:+		1–5	-:+
Kispest	3–7		1–4	0–4		6–5		2–3		
MTK Budapest		6–1			2–1		3–1		1–3	3–1
Szegedi AK	5–2		6–3	1–4		1–2		6–3		
Szentlőrinc		2–6			2–7		2–2		1–0	1–4
Újpest	9–2		2–2	+:-		4–4		9–0		
Vasas	3–4		3–1	+:-		2–1		3–1		

Legend: Blue = home team win; Yellow = draw; Red = away team win.

=== Relegation round ===
1945–46 relegation competition of places 6–10 of both competitions (matches against teams in "own" class not played anymore, results of these matches copied from original competition).

==== Table ====
Pos	Team	Pld	W	D	L	GF	GA	GR	Pts	Relegation
11	Soroksár FC	18	10	2	6	42	29	1.448	22	
12	Dorogi Bányász	18	8	5	5	36	38	0.947	21	
13	Szolnoki MÁV	18	6	8	4	34	27	1.259	20	
14	Győri ETO	18	9	2	7	32	27	1.185	20	
15	Pécsi Vasutas SK	18	8	4	6	41	41	1.000	20	Relegated to NB II
16	Zuglói MADISZ	18	7	5	6	40	39	1.026	19	Relegated to NB II
17	Salgótarjáni BTC	18	7	4	7	41	36	1.139	18	Relegated to NB II
18	Diósgyőri VTK	18	6	6	6	26	33	0.788	18	Relegated to NB II
19	Kőbányai Barátság	18	5	3	10	45	53	0.849	13	Relegated to NB II
20	Elektromos FC	18	2	5	11	24	38	0.632	9	Relegated to NB II

Source: rsssf.com

==== Results ====
Home \ Away	DIÓ	DOR	ELE	GYŐ	KŐB	PÉC	SAL	SOR	SZO	ZUG
Diósgyőr		1–1		1–2	2–1	1–1			1–0	
Dorogi Bányász	1–1		2–1				3–2	2–2		0–2
Elektromos		1–3		2–0	2–2	1–4			1–1	
Győri	3–1		2–1				1–0	1–0		0–2
Kőbányai Barátság	5–0		0–4				2–4	3–4		3–4
Pécsi Vasutas	0–3		4–3				1–7	1–1		4–1
Salgótarján		2–1		0–0	0–5	3–4			0–2	
Soroksár		1–0		3–1	4–0	1–2			1–3	
Szolnok	1–0		1–0				1–1	1–1		2–2
Zuglói MADISZ		1–2		0–0	3–0	3–2			2–5	

Legend: Blue = home team win; Yellow = draw; Red = away team win.

== Statistical leaders ==
=== Top goalscorers ===
Rank	Scorer	Club	Goals
1	(Hungary) Ferenc Deák	Szentlőrinci AC	66
2	(Hungary) Gyula Zsengellér	Újpesti TE	51
3	(Hungary) Ferenc Szusza	Újpesti TE	45
4	(Hungary) Gyula Szilágyi	Vasas SC	44
5	(Hungary) István Mike	Ferencvárosi TC	43
6	(Hungary) Ferenc Puskás	Kispest AC	35
7	(Hungary) Mihály Vörös	Szegedi AK	35
8	(Hungary) György Sárosi	Ferencvárosi TC	31
8	(Hungary) Gyula Schubert	Kőbányai Barátság	31
10	(Hungary) Mihály Keszthelyi	Csepel SC	30
10	(Hungary) Ede Moór	Zuglói MADISZ	30
