= Adalbert Marksteiner =

Association football player (1919–1976)

Adalbert Marksteiner / Béla Marosvári
Personal information
- Date of birth: 7 April 1919
- Place of birth: Covăsânț, Hungary (now Romania)
- Date of death: 4 January 1976
- Place of death: Budapest, Hungary
- Position: Forward

Senior career*
Years	Team	Apps	(Gls)
1937–1940	Ripensia Timişoara	63	(62)
1941–1951	Csepel SC	284	(157)
Total		347	(219)

International career
1939	Romania	2	(0)
1943	Hungary	1	(0)

Managerial career
- 1953–1954: Csepel SC
- 1958: Dynamo Žilina
- 1960–1963: Budafoki MTE
- 1966–1967: Dunaújváros
- 1968–1970: Salgótarjáni
- 1970–1973: Budapesti VSC
- 1973–1974: Debrecen
- 1975: Erzsébeti Spartacus
- * Club domestic league appearances and goals

Adalbert Marksteiner (Hungarian: Béla Marosvári) was a football player and coach. A forward, he played for Ripensia Timişoara and Csepel SC. At international level, represented the Hungary and Romania national teams.

== Honours ==
Ripensia Timişoara

- Liga I: 1937–38

Csepel SC

- Nemzeti Bajnokság I: 1941–42, 1942–43, 1947–48

Individual

- Liga I top scorer: 1938–39
- Hungarian Football Federation Player of the Year: 1948
