= Kőbányai Barátság =

Hungarian football club

- Full name: Kőbányai Barátság
- Founded: ?
- Dissolved: 1947
Home colours

Kőbányai Barátság was a Hungarian football club from the town of Kőbánya, Budapest, Hungary.

== History ==
Kőbányai Barátság debuted in the 1945–46 season of the Hungarian League and finished nineteenth.

== Name changes ==
- ??–1947: Kőbányai Barátság
- 1946: merger with Kőbányai MTE
- 1947: merger with Szentlőrinci AC Barátság

== Seasons ==
The table below shows the seasons of Kőbányai Barátság.

Season	Tier	Club's name	Position	Pts
1945	2	Kőbányai Barátság	2 / 12	40
1945–46	1	Kőbányai Barátság	8 / 14	25
1945–46	1	Kőbányai Barátság	19 / 10	13
1946–47	2	Kőbányai Barátság	13 / 14	9
