= 1947–48 Nemzeti Bajnokság I =

Nemzeti Bajnokság I
- Season: 1947–48
- Champions: Csepel SC

Statistics of the Hungarian football league Nemzeti Bajnokság I in the 1947–48 season. With an average attendance of 19,500, Ferencváros recorded the highest average home league attendance.

== Overview ==
It was contested by 17 teams, and Csepel SC won the championship.

== League standings ==
Pos	Team	Pld	W	D	L	GF	GA	GR	Pts
1	Csepel SC	32	24	4	4	73	32	2.281	52
2	Vasas SC	32	22	7	3	76	31	2.452	51
3	Ferencvárosi TC	32	23	4	5	77	39	1.974	50
4	Kispest AC	32	21	6	5	82	42	1.952	48
5	Újpest FC	32	18	8	6	83	43	1.930	44
6	MTK Budapest FC	32	19	4	9	75	36	2.083	42
7	Szombathelyi Haladás	32	13	7	12	49	48	1.021	33
8	MATEOSZ	32	11	9	12	42	42	1.000	31
9	Salgótarjáni BTC	32	10	6	16	32	55	0.582	26
10	Szentlőrinci AC	32	8	9	15	38	63	0.603	25
11	Győri ETO FC	32	11	2	19	47	62	0.758	24
12	Szegedi Bástya	32	9	6	17	30	55	0.545	24
13	Elektromos FC	32	7	8	17	30	61	0.492	22
14	Erzsébeti Spartacus MTK LE	32	9	4	19	33	72	0.458	22
15	Szolnoki MÁV FC	32	8	5	19	33	69	0.478	21
16	Debreceni VSC	32	8	3	21	37	76	0.487	19
17	MOGÜRT SC	32	4	2	26	23	34	0.676	10

Source: rsssf.com

== Results ==
Home \ Away	CSE	DEB	ELE	ERZ	FTC	GYŐ	HAL	KIS	MAT	MTK	MOG	SAL	SZE	SZT	SZO	ÚJP	VAS
Csepel		6–0	4–2	1–0	1–1	3–2	0–2	1–3	1–0	3–2	5–0	5–0	2–1	3–1	2–1	3–0	2–1
Debrecen	1–2		2–0	2–1	1–2	4–0	0–1	0–4	1–3	2–4	1–7	0–0	0–1	0–2	1–3	1–4	1–5
Elektromos	0–6	2–1		0–1	2–4	0–2	0–3	1–4	0–0	3–2	5–1	0–1	2–1	0–0	0–1	0–1	0–1
Erzsébeti	0–1	3–0	0–0		2–2	0–2	1–0	0–2	2–1	1–6	0–2	0–5	0–3	0–3	0–2	2–1	0–9
Ferencváros	3–4	4–2	2–0	5–3		1–3	1–1	4–1	1–0	1–0	4–1	1–0	0–3	5–1	3–1	1–5	2–0
Győr	0–1	2–1	0–3	1–0	1–4		0–1	0–4	3–1	0–2	3–0	1–2	6–1	1–2	1–2	1–2	2–2
Haladás	1–2	6–4	4–2	1–1	0–5	0–0		1–2	2–0	1–3	1–1	0–1	2–0	3–3	2–1	2–3	3–1
Kispest	0–0	3–0	3–3	3–3	1–3	2–1	4–2		1–2	3–2	4–3	3–0	3–1	4–0	2–1	0–1	3–3
MATEOSZ	1–2	1–0	0–0	4–0	0–2	4–1	0–1	4–4		3–2	0–1	1–0	2–0	3–4	1–1	1–1	1–5
MTK Budapest	1–0	3–1	5–0	1–0	2–1	3–1	2–1	2–0	2–2		3–2	0–2	8–0	1–1	1–0	2–2	0–2
MOGÜRT	-:+ (Note: MOGÜRT SC Budapest withdrew after 14 games. Of the remaining 18 matches, 17 games were scored with a goalless win for the opponents.)	-:+	-:+	-:+	-:+	-:+	-:+	-:+	-:+	-:+		-:+	-:+	-:+	-:+	-:+	-:+
Salgótarján	2–0	2–2	1–1	2–6	1–2	1–4	3–1	0–4	0–2	1–6	2–1		1–1	1–1	1–0	1–3	0–1
Szegedi Bástya	0–1	0–1	-:+ (Note: The two games of Szegedi AK against Elektromos and against MOGÜRT were counted as goalless victories for the opponents.)	2–1	0–2	2–0	2–1	0–5	1–1	0–1	-:+	1–0		0–0	1–1	2–5	1–3
Szentlőrinc	2–3	0–1	2–3	1–2	1–3	3–2	1–1	1–4	1–1	1–0	+:-	1–1	1–3		0–0	3–10	0–1
Szolnok	2–6	2–3	0–0	1–2	1–5	1–4	2–5	1–3	1–2	0–9	1–0	1–0	1–1	1–0		0–2	1–5
Újpest	1–1	1–2	4–0	7–1	0–2	6–1	0–0	1–2	0–0	2–0	2–2	4–1	2–2	4–2	6–3		0–2
Vasas	2–2	2–1	4–1	2–1	1–1	4–2	3–0	1–1	2–1	0–0	3–2	2–0	3–0	2–0	1–0	3–3	

Source: rsssf.com
Legend: Blue = home team win; Yellow = draw; Red = away team win.

== Statistical leaders ==
=== Top goalscorers ===
Rank	Scorer	Club	Goals
1	(Hungarian Republic (1946–49)) Ferenc Puskás	Kispest AC	50
2	(Hungarian Republic (1946–49)) Ferenc Deák	Ferencvárosi TC	41
3	(Hungarian Republic (1946–49)) Gyula Szilágyi	Vasas SC	40
4	(Hungarian Republic (1946–49)) Ferenc Szusza	Újpesti TE	27
5	(Hungarian Republic (1946–49)) Nándor Hidegkuti	MTK Budapest	21
5	(Hungarian Republic (1946–49)) Béla Marosvári	Csepel SC	21
7	(Hungarian Republic (1946–49)) Gyula Bodola	MTK Budapest	17
8	(Hungarian Republic (1946–49)) Károly Bihari	Erzsébeti MTK	15
8	(Hungarian Republic (1946–49)) Béla Egresi	Újpesti TE	15
10	(Hungarian Republic (1946–49)) Lajos Várnai	Újpesti TE	14

== See also ==
- 1947–48 Nemzeti Bajnokság II
