= 1925–26 Nemzeti Bajnokság II =

Nemzeti Bajnokság II
- Season: 1925–26
- Champions: Fővárosi TK

The 1925–26 Nemzeti Bajnokság II season was the 26th edition of the Nemzeti Bajnokság II.

== League table ==
Pos	Team	Pld	W	D	L	GF	GA	GD	Pts
1	Fővárosi TK	26	15	9	2	54	34	+20	39
2	Zuglói VII. kerületi AC	26	15	8	3	48	24	+24	38
3	Újpesti Törekvés SE	26	16	5	5	74	32	+42	37
4	Budapesti AK	26	14	6	6	48	38	+10	34
5	Testvériség SE	26	11	7	8	56	53	+3	29
6	MÁV Gépgyári SK	25	9	8	8	47	44	+3	26
7	Budapest SE	25	11	3	11	44	44	0	25
8	Erzsébetfalvai Törekvés SC	26	9	6	11	38	44	−6	24
9	Újpesti MTE	25	9	4	12	46	43	+3	22
10	Kereskedelmi Alkalmazottak OE	25	7	6	12	36	45	−9	20
11	Rákospalotai AC	26	6	7	13	45	65	−20	19
12	Újpest-Rákospalotai AK	26	6	6	14	41	52	−11	18
13	Erzsébeti MTK	26	4	8	14	28	55	−27	16
14	Világosság SC	26	4	5	17	33	65	−32	13

== Countryside chamionships ==
=== Western district ===
Pos	Team	Pld	W	D	L	GF	GA	GD	Pts
1	Szombathelyi AK	18	15	2	1	73	13	+60	32
2	Tatabányai SC	18	11	4	3	58	18	+40	26
3	Szombathelyi SE	18	9	4	5	50	29	+21	22
4	Szombathelyi MÁV Haladás SC (Note: former Szombathelyi Haladás Vasutas Sport Egyesület)	17	10	1	6	32	33	−1	21
5	Győri ETO	18	8	3	7	47	32	+15	19
6	DAC-Hungária-Győri Vasutas SE (Note: new name: Dunántúli Atlétikai Club, Győr)	17	6	6	5	38	39	−1	18
7	Soproni Vasutas SE	18	6	4	8	29	41	−12	16
8	Székesfehérvári TC	17	3	3	11	21	52	−31	9
9	Győri AC	18	3	2	13	16	69	−53	8
10	Székesfehérvári Duna-Száva-Adria Vasút Előre TK	17	1	3	13	19	52	−33	5

== See also ==
- 1925–26 Magyar Kupa
- 1925–26 Nemzeti Bajnokság I
