= 1946–47 Nemzeti Bajnokság I =

Nemzeti Bajnokság I
- Season: 1946–47
- Champions: Újpest FC

In the 1946–47 Hungarian League, Újpesti TE won the championship. With an average attendance of 12,667, Ferencváros recorded the highest average home league attendance.

== Final standings ==
Pos	Team	Pld	W	D	L	GF	GA	GR	Pts	Qualification or relegation
1	Újpesti TE	30	21	5	4	106	43	2.465	47	Champions
2	Kispest	30	17	7	6	77	37	2.081	41	
3	Vasas SC	30	16	7	7	77	43	1.791	39	
4	FTC	30	16	6	8	70	39	1.795	38	
5	MTK	30	14	3	13	52	43	1.209	31	
6	Csepel	30	13	5	12	57	48	1.188	31	
7	Szentlőrinci AC	30	11	8	11	70	64	1.094	30	
8	Debreceni VSC	30	13	4	13	57	70	0.814	30	
9	Szeged	30	12	5	13	57	64	0.891	29	
10	Szolnok	30	12	5	13	46	55	0.836	29	
11	Haladás	30	11	6	13	49	47	1.043	28	
12	Győri ETO FC	30	11	5	14	54	49	1.102	27	
13	Dorogi Bányász	30	11	5	14	58	60	0.967	27	
14	Soroksár FC	30	11	5	14	35	56	0.625	27	
15	Perecesi TK	30	11	1	18	47	75	0.627	23	Relegated to NB II
16	Testvériség SE	30	1	1	28	26	145	0.179	3	Relegated to NB II

== Results ==
Home \ Away	CSE	DEB	DOR	FTC	GYŐ	HAL	KIS	MTK	PER	SOR	SZE	SZT	SZO	TES	ÚJP	VAS
Csepel		2–0	6–1	1–1	1–2	0–3	1–1	2–2	6–1	3–0	1–2	3–1	0–1	3–2	2–1	1–4
Debrecen	3–2		3–2	2–3	2–1	3–2	0–4	1–0	0–3	3–3	3–5	1–3	3–1	3–1	1–7	4–5
Dorogi Bányász	4–1	1–1		1–2	2–1	2–1	4–0	4–0	5–0	1–2	1–1	1–1	3–1	2–2	0–5	2–1
Ferencváros	1–0	2–0	6–1		2–1	0–0	0–3	1–2	3–1	3–0	5–0	10–0	4–1	2–0	1–0	0–4
Győr	1–4	2–0	2–1	3–0		0–2	0–3	2–0	3–1	3–0	2–3	2–2	1–2	4–0	1–3	0–2
Haladás	1–0	1–2	1–0	1–0	1–1		2–2	1–4	2–3	0–1	1–1	5–1	0–1	4–1	1–2	1–5
Kispest	2–2	-:+ (Note: The match was settled with a goalless win.)	5–0	2–1	2–2	4–2		1–2	3–0	2–0	1–0	1–1	6–1	10–0	3–0	3–4
MTK Budapest	1–2	3–1	0–1	3–3	1–2	0–2	2–3		2–1	4–1	-:+	2–1	1–0	2–0	2–1	2–2
Perecesi	1–0	4–7	3–3	3–0	3–0	0–1	3–0	2–1		3–0	0–2	0–1	2–1	0–3	2–3	1–8
Soroksár	0–3	0–2	1–0	1–5	2–1	2–0	0–1	2–0	3–1		0–0	2–0	0–0	6–0	0–2	0–0
Szeged	2–3	1–3	3–1	2–2	0–5	1–1	1–3	0–2	5–0	7–0		0–6	2–1	7–2	1–2	1–5
Szentlőrinc	5–2	5–0	1–3	1–5	2–2	6–0	2–1	1–3	5–1	2–2	2–3		1–3	3–1	1–3	2–1
Szolnok	1–1	3–1	1–0	1–0	0–0	0–2	2–2	1–3	4–1	1–3	1–0	1–1		7–1	1–3	3–1
Testvériség	0–1	0–4	0–9	2–5	0–8	0–7	1–3	1–6	1–4	2–3	1–4	0–7	2–5		2–12	0–1
Újpest	3–2	3–3	5–2	1–1	5–1	4–3	3–3	2–1	1–0	4–1	5–1	4–4	10–1	8–1		1–1
Vasas	1–2	1–1	4–1	2–2	3–1	1–1	1–3	2–1	2–3	3–0	5–2	2–2	1–0	5–0	0–3	

Source: rsssf.com
Legend: Blue = home team win; Yellow = draw; Red = away team win.

== Statistical leaders ==
=== Top goalscorers ===
Rank	Scorer	Club	Goals
1	(Hungarian Republic (1946–49)) Ferenc Deák	Szentlőrinci AC	48
2	(Hungarian Republic (1946–49)) Ferenc Puskás	Kispest AC	32
3	(Hungarian Republic (1946–49)) Gyula Szilágyi	Vasas SC	27
4	(Hungarian Republic (1946–49)) István Mike	Ferencvárosi TC	22
4	(Hungarian Republic (1946–49)) Lajos Várnai	Újpesti TE	22
6	(Hungarian Republic (1946–49)) Béla Egresi	Újpesti TE	21
7	(Hungarian Republic (1946–49)) Ignác Kertesi	Perecesi TK	19
7	(Hungarian Republic (1946–49)) Ferenc Szusza	Újpesti TE	19
9	(Hungarian Republic (1946–49)) Béla Marosvári	Csepel SC	18
9	(Hungarian Republic (1946–49)) József Molnár	Dorogi AC	18
9	(Hungarian Republic (1946–49)) Gyula Zsengellér	Újpesti TE	18

== See also ==
- 1946–47 Nemzeti Bajnokság II
