= Dózsa MaDISz TE =

Hungarian football club

- Full name: Dózsa MaDISz Torna Egylet
- Founded: 1945
- Dissolved: 1948
Home colours

Dózsa MaDISz Torna Egylet was a Hungarian football club from Budapest, Hungary.

== History ==
Dózsa MaDISz TE debuted in the 1945–46 season of the Hungarian League and finished fourteenth .

== Name Changes ==
- 1945–1946: IX. ker. Dózsa MaDISz
- 1946–1948: Budapesti Partizán Sport Club
- 1948: dissolved
