= Újpesti MTE =

Hungarian football club

- Full name: Újpesti Munkásképző Torna Egyesület
- Founded: 1912
- Dissolved: ?
- Ground: Tungsram pálya
Home colours

Újpesti Munkásképző Torna Egyesület was a Hungarian football club from the town of Újpest, Budapest, Hungary.

== History ==
Újpesti Munkásképző Torna Egyesület debuted in the 1945–46 season of the Hungarian League and finished eleventh.

== Name Changes ==
- 1912–1939: Újpesti Munkásképző Torna Egyesület
- 1939–1944: Újpesti MSE
- 1944: dissolved due to political reasons
- 1945–1949: Újpesti Munkásképző Torna Egyesület
- 1949: merger with Wolfner SE as Bőripari Dolgozók SE
- 1957: reestablished
- 1957–?: Újpesti MTE
