= 1944 Nemzeti Bajnokság I =

Nemzeti Bajnokság I
- Season: 1944

Statistics of Nemzeti Bajnokság I in the 1944 season.

== Overview ==
It was contested by 12 teams, and the championship was unfinished, no winner was announced.

== League standings ==
Pos	Team	Pld	W	D	L	GF	GA	GR	Pts
1	Ferencvárosi TC	11	9	1	1	44	11	4.000	19
2	Újpest FC	11	9	1	1	39	17	2.294	19
3	Csepel SC	11	7	0	4	32	28	1.143	14
4	Gamma FC	11	5	2	4	24	18	1.333	12
5	Vasas SC	11	5	1	5	21	20	1.050	11
6	MÁVAG	11	5	1	5	24	30	0.800	11
7	Zuglói SE	11	5	1	5	28	36	0.778	11
8	Elektromos FC	11	5	0	6	28	24	1.167	10
9	Kiniszi Vasas	11	4	2	5	26	25	1.040	10
10	Kispest AC	11	3	0	8	27	33	0.818	6
11	BSZKRT	11	3	0	8	14	31	0.452	6
12	SZAC	11	1	1	9	9	43	0.209	3

Source: rsssf.com

== Results ==
Home \ Away	FTC	ÚJP	CSE	GAM	VAS	MÁV	ZUG	ELE	KIN	KIS	BSZ	SZA
Ferencváros		1–1	4–1	5–0	6–2	1–2	5–1	3–1	5–0	4–3	4–0	6–0
Újpest			3–5	3–2	4–0	4–3	7–3	4–0	3–1	2–0	5–1	3–1
Csepel				0–7	2–5	5–0	7–0	1–0	0–5	3–2	5–1	3–1
Gamma					1–0	1–1	1–4	3–1	2–1	6–1	0–1	1–1
Vasas						1–2	4–0	0–1	2–2	3–2	2–0	2–0
MÁVAG							1–4	5–4	2–4	2–5	3–1	3–0
Zugló								2–4	1–1	5–4	2–1	6–1
Elektromos									3–1	2–1	2–3	10–1
Kiniszi Vasas										1–4	5–3	5–0
Kispest											3–1	2–4
BSZKRT												2–0
SZAC												

Source: rsssf.com
