= Perecesi TK =

Hungarian football club

- Full name: Perecesi Torna Klub
- Founded: 1923
- Dissolved: 1975
Home colours

Perecesi Torna Klub was a Hungarian football club from Pereces, district of Miskolc that continued in existence for a little over five decades.

== History ==
Perecesi TK was established in 1923. The first director was Gábor Plesek.

Perecesi Torna Klub debuted in the 1946–47 season of the Hungarian League and finished fifteenth.

== Name Changes ==
- 1923–1949: Perecesi TK
- 1949–1951: Perecesi Tárna TK
- 1951–1957: Perecesi Bányász SK
- 1957–1958: Perecesi TK
- 1958–1959: Perecesi Bányász
- 1959–1975: Miskolci Bányász

== Honours ==
- Nemzeti Bajnokság III:
  - Winners (1): 1962–63

== Seasons ==
The table below shows the seasons of Perecesi TK.

Season	Tier	Club's name	Position	Pts
1922–23	3	Perecesi TK	7 / 9	
1923–24	3	Perecesi TK	4 / 7	16
1924–25	3	Perecesi TK	2 / 8	20
1925–26	2	Perecesi TK	8 / 10	9
1926–27	2	Perecesi TK	6 / 8	9
1927–28	2	Perecesi TK	5 / 8	15
1928–29	2	Perecesi TK	7 / 10	11
1929–30	2	Perecesi TK	10 / 10	10
1930–31	3	Perecesi TK	1 / 9	31
1931–32	2	Perecesi TK	8 / 10	15
1932–33	2	Perecesi TK	4 / 11	
1933–34	2	Perecesi TK	7 / 10	16
1934–35	2	Perecesi TK	4 / 10	20
1935–36	2	Perecesi TK	3 / 10	21
1936–37	2	Perecesi TK	4 / 12	26
1937–38	2	Perecesi TK	2 / 12	28
1938–39	2	Perecesi TK	6 / 14	24
1939–40	2	Perecesi TK	9 / 16	27
1940–41	2	Perecesi TK	5 / 14	29
1941–42	2	Perecesi TK	11 / 14	22
1942–43	2	Perecesi TK	8 / 12	21
1943–44	2	Perecesi TK	8 / 14	26
1944–45	2	Perecesi TK	2 / 11	9
1944–45	2	Perecesi TK	0 / 10	
1945	2	Perecesi TK	2 / 8	23
1945–46	2	Perecesi TK	1 / 12	39
1946–47	1	Pereces TK	15 / 16	23
1947–48	2	Perecesi TK	2 / 13	33
1948–49	2	Pereces TK	3 / 16	39
1949–50	2	Perecesi Tárna TK	8 / 16	34
1950	2	Perecesi Tárna	3 / 16	21
1951	2	Perecesi Bányász	12 / 14	21
1952	2	Perecesi Bányász	9 / 18	34
1953	2	Perecesi Bányász	4 / 16	37
1954	2	Perecesi Bányász	7 / 16	34
1955	2	Perecesi Bányász	12 / 16	27
1956	2	Perecesi TK	11 / 16	26
1957–58	2	Perecesi TK	19 / 19	14
1958–59	3	Perecesi Bányász	6 / 16	32
1959–60	3	Miskolci Bányász SK	7 / 17	32
1960–61	3	Miskolci Bányász	3 / 16	39
1961–62	3	Miskolci Bányász	2 / 16	44
1962–63	3	Miskolci Bányász	1 / 16	47
1963	3	Miskolci Bányász	11 / 18	16
1964	3	Miskolci Bányász	15 / 18	29
1965	3	Miskolci Bányász	14 / 18	29
1966	3	Miskolci Bányász	18 / 18	23
1967	4	Miskolci Bányász	3 / 16	39
1968	4	Miskolci Bányász	14 / 16	26
1969	4	Miskolci Bányász	3 / 16	34
1970	4	Miskolci Bányász	8 / 16	15
1970–71	4	Miskolci Bányász	4 / 16	34
1971–72	4	Miskolci Bányász	6 / 16	32
1972–73	4	Miskolci Bányász	10 / 16	27
1973–74	4	Miskolci Bányász	15 / 16	16
