= Ferenc Deák (footballer) =

Hungarian footballer

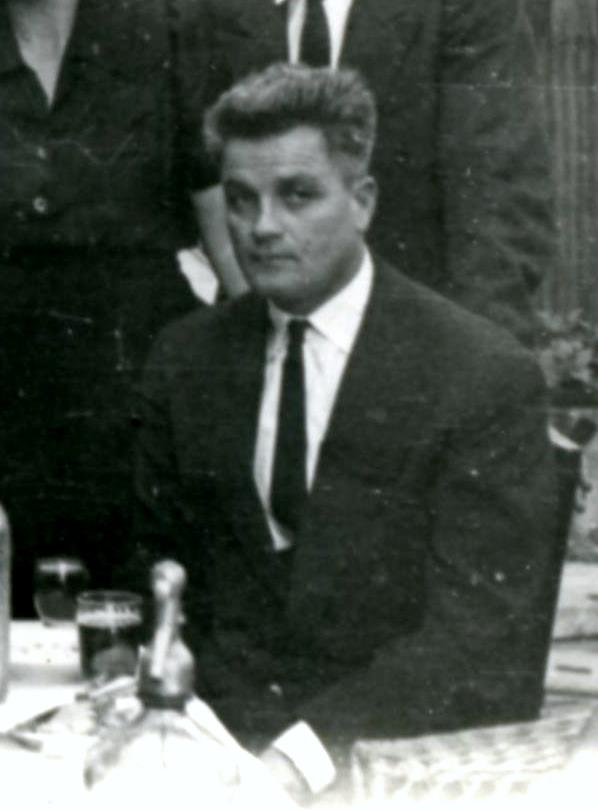

Personal information
- Date of birth: 16 January 1922
- Place of birth: Budapest, Hungary
- Date of death: 18 April 1998 (aged 76)
- Place of death: Budapest, Hungary
- Position: Striker

Senior career*
Years	Team	Apps	(Gls)
1940–1947	Szentlőrinci AC	186	(358)
1947–1950	Ferencvárosi TC	83	(121)
1950–1954	Újpesti Dózsa	107	(109)
1955–1957	Spartacus Budapest	48	(52)
1957	Vörös Meteor	10	(6)
1959	BFC Siófok	2	(2)
Total		436	(648 (Note: This figure includes reserve leagues.))

International career
1946–1949	Hungary	20	(29)
- * Club domestic league appearances and goals

Ferenc Deák (16 January 1922 – 18 April 1998) was a Hungarian footballer who played as a striker for clubs such as Szentlőrinci AC, Ferencváros and Budapesti Dózsa, and who played internationally for Hungary, scoring 29 goals in just 20 caps. His nickname was Bamba. He holds the European record for most goals scored in a single season in top division championships with 66 since 1946. With over 795 goals in official matches scored during his career, he is the eighth top goalscorer of all time. Including friendly and unofficial matches, he is also the seventh top goalscorer of all time with over 1374 goals in just 839 matches.

== Early life ==
He was born on 16 January 1922 in Ferencváros, Budapest. Deák, who also worked in his family's bakery, began his career as a goalkeeper at the age of thirteen, but his parents banned him from football when a shot hit him in the head and he lost consciousness. However, outside the field, his talent to strike a ball skilfully, powerfully and accurately was quickly noticed by a coach who was searching for talent, and that coach subsequently managed to convince his parents that the boy could continue playing, but they made a condition: he could no longer stand in between the posts.

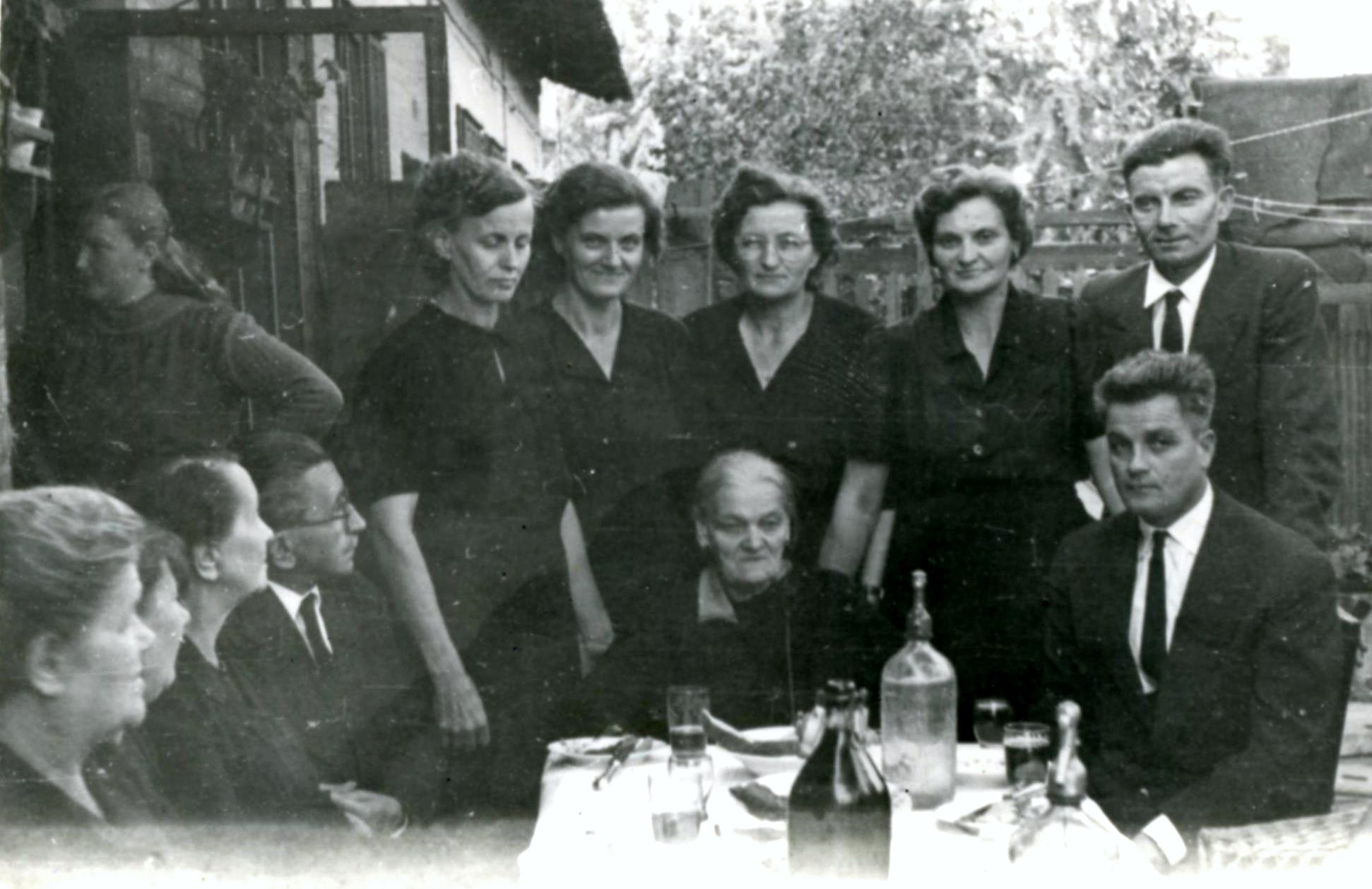
Ferenc Deák and his family

== Club career ==
Deák continued his footballing career now as a striker, and he got off to a very good start as he scored six goals in his senior debut in 1940 in his place of residence, Pestszentlőrinc, playing for one of the local teams, Szentlőrinci AC, in the third division, and he was pivotal in helping the club to reach the top-flight in 1944. He then topped the European top scoring list three times, in the 1945–46 (66), 1946–47 (48) and 1948–49 (59) seasons. His best season was the 1945–46 league season, when he scored 66 goals in 34 matches, and because of it, he was voted the Hungarian Player of the Year. He still holds the record for the most goals scored in a single European league season with 66. In absolute terms, only American Archibald Stark did better with 67 goals in the 1924–25 season, but he needed 44 matches to reach that figure.

Because of these impressive numbers, Deák was eventually signed by Ferencváros in 1947, and he played for them as a center-forward for three years, from 1947 to 1950, winning the Hungarian championship at the end of the 1948–49 season. In this league season, the attackers of the team celebrated the half-century anniversary of the club's formation (Ferencváros was founded in 1899) with 140 goals in just 30 matches, of which Deák himself contributed with 59 hits. He scored 155 goals in 111 matches (121 in 83 matches in the league only) over three years in green and white.

Deák got the nickname "Bamba" from the fans because, as he later recalled in a report,

“I was named that way even in Lőrinc, because, as is my good habit, I am always in the middle of the pitch, at the halfway line, apparently having nothing to do there, but when the ball cames, I bamboo, I always move quickly and unexpectedly and I would often go on to score, and this is the most beautiful way to play football! Even so...”

— Ferenc Deák

After three years (1947–50) at Ferencváros, he then moved to rival's Újpest (politics played a role in the move), and during his four years with the purple-whites, he did not stop scoring there either, scoring 53 goals in 77 matches. He spent the last years of his playing career at Spartacus Budapest, VM Egyetértés and Siófok. The "goalkeeper" Deák has a total of 303 league goals, winning three Hungarian League titles, and in 1997 he was awarded the title of goal king of the century in Munich.

In 1999 (posthumously) he received the Hungarian Heritage Award and became an honorary citizen of Pestszentimre-Pestszentlőrinc. Ferenc Deák is remembered for the goblet, which is handed over to the top scorer of the top championship every year, and a wandering cup has also been named after him. In 2007 he took his name in an XVIII. district primary and sports school youth football base. His legacy has been preserved by the Puskás Academy since 2015. His life novel was published in 1992 as The Bamba, with the subtitle The Greatest Goal King of All Time.

== International career ==
Deák Bamba was also excellent in the national team, playing in 20 matches for the Hungary national team from 1946 to 1949, scoring 29 goals, thus having a ratio of 1.45, which is a world record, being just ahead of Just Fontaine, who scored 30 goals in 21 matches for France for a ratio of 1.43.

He scored 3 hat-tricks for Hungary, including a poker against Bulgaria in the 1947 Balkan Cup, where the Hungarian team beat the Bulgarians 9-0. This 4-goal haul helped him to be the top goal scorer of the 1947 Balkan Cup with 5 goals as Hungary won the tournament in its first attempt. With 9 goals in the Balkan Cup, he is among the all-time top goal scorers in the competition's history. Then, in 1949, the newly appointed coach, Gusztáv Sebes, judged the excellent center to be politically unreliable (the same politic issues that forced him to leave Ferencváros in 1950), so he expelled him from the team and replaced him with Hidegkuti. Bamba was very worn out, as he missed Hungary's Olympic victory at the 1952 Summer Olympics, the match of the century in 1953, the 1954 World Cup which Hungary nearly won and all the successes that made the Hungarian national team the best team in the world for many years.

== International goals ==
Hungary score listed first, score column indicates score after each Deák goal.

List of international goals scored by Ferenc Deák
No.	Cap	Date	Venue	Opponent	Score	Result	Competition
1	1	6 October 1946	Üllői úti stadion, Budapest, Hungary	Austria	1–0	2–0	Friendly
2	1	6 October 1946	Üllői úti stadion, Budapest, Hungary	Austria	2–0	2–0	Friendly
3	2	30 October 1946	Stade Émile Mayrisch, Esch-sur-Alzette, Luxembourg	Luxembourg	2–1	7–2	Friendly
4	2	30 October 1946	Stade Émile Mayrisch, Esch-sur-Alzette, Luxembourg	Luxembourg	5–2	7–2	Friendly
5	2	30 October 1946	Stade Émile Mayrisch, Esch-sur-Alzette, Luxembourg	Luxembourg	6–2	7–2	Friendly
6	3	17 August 1947	Üllői úti stadion, Budapest, Hungary	Bulgaria	1–0	9–0	1947 Balkan Cup
7	3	17 August 1947	Üllői úti stadion, Budapest, Hungary	Bulgaria	3–0	9–0	1947 Balkan Cup
8	3	17 August 1947	Üllői úti stadion, Budapest, Hungary	Bulgaria	7–0	9–0	1947 Balkan Cup
9	3	17 August 1947	Üllői úti stadion, Budapest, Hungary	Bulgaria	8–0	9–0	1947 Balkan Cup
10	4	20 August 1947	Üllői úti stadion, Budapest, Hungary	Albania	3–0	3–0	1947 Balkan Cup
11	6	21 April 1948	Üllői úti stadion, Budapest, Hungary	Switzerland	2–3	7–4	1948–53 Central European Cup
12	6	21 April 1948	Üllői úti stadion, Budapest, Hungary	Switzerland	5–3	7–4	1948–53 Central European Cup
13	7	2 May 1948	Praterstadion, Vienna, Austria	Austria	2–1	2–3	1948–53 Central European Cup
14	8	23 May 1948	Üllői úti stadion, Budapest, Hungary	Czechoslovakia	2–0	2–1	1948–53 Central European Cup and 1948 Balkan Cup
15	9	19 September 1948	Stadion Wojska Polskiego, Warsaw, Poland	Poland	4–2	6–2	1948 Balkan Cup
16	10	3 October 1948	Megyeri úti Stadion, Újpest, Hungary	Austria	1–0	2–0	Friendly
17	11	24 October 1948	Stadionul ONEF, Bucharest, Romania	Romania	2–0	5–1	1948 Balkan Cup
18	11	24 October 1948	Stadionul ONEF, Bucharest, Romania	Romania	4–0	5–1	1948 Balkan Cup
19	14	8 May 1949	Megyeri úti Stadion, Újpest, Hungary	Austria	1–0	6–1	1948–53 Central European Cup
20	14	8 May 1949	Megyeri úti Stadion, Újpest, Hungary	Austria	4–0	6–1	1948–53 Central European Cup
21	15	12 June 1949	Megyeri úti Stadion, Újpest, Hungary	Italy	1–1	1–1	1948–53 Central European Cup
22	17	10 July 1949	Oláh Gábor utcai Stadion, Debrecen, Poland	Poland	1–0	8–2	Friendly
23	17	10 July 1949	Oláh Gábor utcai Stadion, Debrecen, Poland	Poland	4–0	8–2	Friendly
24	17	10 July 1949	Oláh Gábor utcai Stadion, Debrecen, Poland	Poland	6–0	8–2	Friendly
25	17	10 July 1949	Oláh Gábor utcai Stadion, Debrecen, Poland	Poland	7–0	8–2	Friendly
26	18	16 October 1949	Praterstadion, Vienna, Austria	Austria	2–1	4–3	Friendly
27	18	16 October 1949	Praterstadion, Vienna, Austria	Austria	3–1	4–3	Friendly
28	19	30 October 1949	Megyeri úti Stadion, Újpest, Hungary	Bulgaria	1–0	5–0	Friendly
29	20	20 November 1949	Megyeri úti Stadion, Újpest, Hungary	Sweden	5–0	5–0	Friendly

== Honours ==
=== Club ===
Ferencváros

Nemzeti Bajnokság I:

- Champions (1): 1948–49

=== International ===
Hungary

Balkan Cup:

- Champions (1): 1947

=== Individual ===
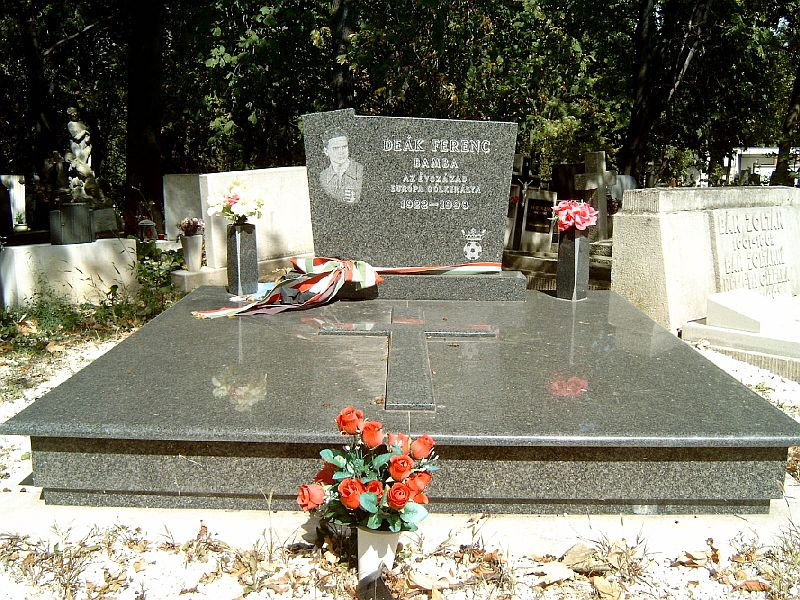
Ferenc Deák's tombstone

- Hungarian Football Federation Player of the Year: 1946
- Seasonwise World Top Scorer (3): 1945–46, 1946–47, 1948–49
- Hungarian League Top Scorer (3): 1945–46, 1946–47 and 1948–49
- Top goalscorer of the 1947 Balkan Cup with 5 goals.

== See also ==
- List of men's footballers with 500 or more goals
- List of footballers who achieved hat-trick records
