= Lampart FC =

Hungarian football club

- Full name: Lampart Futball Club
- Founded: 1910
- Dissolved: ?
- Ground: Gergely utca
- Capacity: 1,000
Home colours

Lampart Futball Club is a Hungarian football club from the town of Budapest.

== History ==
Lampart FC debuted in the 1941–42 season of the Hungarian League and finished fourteenth.

== Name Changes ==
- 1937–1938: FÉG-Lampart
- 1938: merger with Erzsébet FC
- 1938–1943: Lampart FC
- 1943–1945: Fegyvergyári SK
- 1945–1948: Lampart SE
- 1948: merger with Pasaréti SE
- 1948–1951: Lampart MSK
- 1951–1952: Vasas Lampart SK
- 1952–1957: Vasas Kőbányai Zománc
- 1957–?:Lampart SE
