= Herminamezei AC =

Hungarian football club

- Full name: Herminamezei Atlétikai Club
- Founded: 1926
- Dissolved: 1948
Home colours

Herminamezei Atlétikai Club was a Hungarian football club from the town of Zugló, Budapest, Hungary.

== History ==
Herminamezei Atlétikai Club was founded in 1926.

Herminamező debuted in the 1945–46 season of the Hungarian League and finished eleventh.

== Name Changes ==
- 1920–1929: Világosság Sport Club
- 1929–1946: Herminamezei AC
- 1946–1948: Zugló Herminamezei AC
- 1948: merger with Budapesti Meteor SzTK

== Seasons ==
The table below shows the seasons of Herminamezei AC.

Season	Tier	Club's name	Position	Pts
1921–22	5	Világosság SC	3 / 12	25
1922–23	4	Világosság SC	6 / 16	36
1923–24	3	Világosság SC	8 / 15	28
1924–25	3	Világosság SC	2 / 14	34
1925–26	2	Világosság SC	14 / 14	13
1926–27	3	Világosság SC	1 / 16	49
1927–28	2	Világosság SC	6 / 14	30
1928–29	2	Világosság SC	7 / 10	12
1929–30	3	Herminamezői AC	3 / 15	34
1930–31	3	Herminamezei AC	3 / 14	37
1931–32	3	Herminamezei AC	4 / 14	33
1932–33	3	Herminamezei AC	3 / 14	35
1933–34	2	Herminamezei AC	5 / 12	24
1934–35	2	Herminamezei AC	2 / 12	31
1935–36	2	Herminamezei AC	6 / 13	23
1936–37	2	Herminamezei AC	11 / 13	18
1937–38	2	Herminamezei AC	9 / 14	23
1938–39	3	Herminamezei AC	3 / 15	36
1939–40	3	Herminamezei AC	8 / 13	20
1940–41	4	Herminamezei AC	2 / 13	34
1941–42	3	Herminamezei AC	7 / 16	33
1942–43	3	Herminamezei AC	13 / 14	17
1943–44	3	Herminamezei AC	11 / 16	24
1944–45	2	Herminamezei AC	10 / 16	5
1944–45	3	Herminamezei AC	0 / 12	
1945	2	Herminamezei AC	1 / 12	38
1945–46	1	Herminamezei AC	11 / 14	21
1946–47	2	Zugló-Herminamezei AC	10 / 14	22
1947–48	2	Zugló-Herminamezei AC	14 / 14	4
