= 1916–17 Nemzeti Bajnokság I =

Nemzeti Bajnokság I
- Season: 1916–17
- Country: Hungary
- Champions: MTK

Statistics of Nemzeti Bajnokság I for the 1916–17 season.

== Overview ==
It was contested by 12 teams, and MTK Hungária FC won the championship.

== League standings ==
Pos	Team	Pld	W	D	L	GF	GA	GR	Pts
1	MTK Budapest FC	22	21	0	1	113	16	7.063	42
2	Törekvés SE	22	16	2	4	71	20	3.550	34
3	Újpest FC	22	11	5	6	28	28	1.000	27
4	Ferencvárosi TC	22	11	4	7	29	23	1.261	26
5	III. Kerületi TUE	22	9	4	9	32	30	1.067	22
6	Vasas SC	22	6	9	7	29	30	0.967	21
7	Budapesti AK	22	8	2	12	31	52	0.596	18
8	Magyar AC	22	7	4	11	47	53	0.887	18
9	Budapesti TC	22	6	4	12	25	52	0.481	16
10	33 FC	22	6	3	13	25	51	0.490	15
11	Kispest AC	22	5	4	13	22	57	0.386	14
12	Fővárosi TK	22	3	5	14	19	59	0.322	11

Source: rsssf.com

== Results ==
Home \ Away	33F	KER	BAK	BTC	FTC	FŐV	KIS	MAC	MTK	TÖR	ÚJP	VAS
33 FC		2–1	5–4	0–1	2–4	2–2	4–1	3–1	0–5	0–9	0–1	0–2
III. Kerületi	-:+ (Note: The match was settled with a goalless win.)		2–0	0–2	0–0	1–3	3–0	2–1	2–5	4–2	4–1	2–2
Budapesti AK	2–1	-:+		4–0	1–2	12–1	3–3	1–1	-:+	4–2	-:+	1–1
Budapesti TC	1–0	0–1	4–2		2–2	1–2	1–1	2–5	1–7	0–2	1–1	0–0
Ferencváros	2–0	0–2	2–0	0–1		4–1	1–0	3–0	-:+	1–1	1–4	0–0
Főváros	1–1	2–1	0–2	1–3	0–2		1–1	1–2	0–8	0–4	0–2	0–4
Kispest	1–3	0–2	2–3	4–2	1–0	2–1		2–1	0–2	0–4	2–1	1–2
Magyar AC	2–1	2–1	3–3	3–1	0–1	1–0	1–0		1–8	1–3	1–2	2–3
MTK Budapest	5–0	4–2	18–0	11–1	4–1	3–0	10–0	7–1		1–0	+:-	4–0
Törekvés	3–0	2–0	3–1	2–1	3–0	+:-	9–0	7–1	4–2		5–0	4–1
Újpest	1–1	1–1	1–0	1–0	0–1	1–1	2–0	1–0	2–7	3–2		3–1
Vasas	2–0	1–1	2–4	3–0	1–2	2–2	1–1	0–1	1–2	0–0	0–0	

Source: rsssf.com
Legend: Blue = home team win; Yellow = draw; Red = away team win.
