= Szentlőrinci AC =

Hungarian football club

- Full name: 1908 Szentlőrinci AC KSE
- Founded: 1908
- Ground: SZAC Pálya
- Capacity: 1,000
- League: BLSZI
- Website: http://www.1908szac.hu/
Home colours	Away colours

1908 Szentlőrinci AC KSE is a Hungarian football club from the town of Pestszentlőrinc, Budapest.

== History ==
Szentlőrinci Atlétikai Club debuted in the 1945–46 season of the Hungarian League and finished eighth.

On 14 September 2024, they were eliminated by Erzsébeti Spartacus MTK LE from the 2024–25 Magyar Kupa season. The match ended with a 2-1 defeat.

== Name Changes ==
- 1908–1919: Pestszentlőrinci Athletikai Club
- 1919–1945: Szentlőrinci Atlétikai Club
- 1945–1947: Szentlőrinci AC Barátság
- 1947: merger with Kőbányai Barátság
- 1947–1949: Szentlőrinci Atlétikai Club
- 1949: merger with Budapesti Postás SE
- 1956: reestablished
- 1957–1959: Petőfi Szentlőrinci Atlétikai Club

== Honours ==
- Nemzeti Bajnokság II:
  - Winners (1): 1943–44

== Famous footballers ==
- (Hungary) Ferenc Deák: the 8th top goalscorer of all time in football history.

== Managers ==
- (Hungary) László Fenyvesi (1945–46)
- (Hungary) Vilmos Kohut (1948)

== See also ==
List of footballers with 500 or more goals
