= 1941–42 Nemzeti Bajnokság I =

Nemzeti Bajnokság I
- Season: 1941–42
- Champions: Csepel SC
- Relegated: Lampart FC; Szegedi VSE; MÁVAG SK

Statistics of Nemzeti Bajnokság I in the 1941–42 season.

== Overview ==
It was contested by 16 teams, and Csepel SC won the championship.

== League standings ==
Pos	Team	Pld	W	D	L	GF	GA	GR	Pts
1	Csepel SC	30	21	6	3	92	49	1.878	48
2	Újpest FC	30	18	8	4	95	42	2.262	44
3	Szolnoki MÁV FC	30	18	5	7	89	49	1.816	41
4	Szegedi AK	30	15	10	5	95	51	1.863	40
5	Nagyváradi AC	30	14	8	8	81	52	1.558	36
6	Ferencvárosi TC	30	15	5	10	124	69	1.797	35
7	Gamma FC	30	15	2	13	72	67	1.075	32
8	DiMÁVAG	30	10	9	11	72	68	1.059	29
9	Salgótarjáni BTC	30	10	9	11	67	77	0.870	29
10	Elektromos FC	30	10	7	13	63	60	1.050	27
11	Kispest AC	30	12	3	15	67	89	0.753	27
12	Újvidéki AC	30	10	5	15	47	86	0.547	25
13	Kolozsvár AC	30	8	6	16	51	78	0.654	22
14	Lampart FC	30	8	3	19	48	93	0.516	19
15	Szegedi VSE	30	5	3	22	42	113	0.372	13
16	MÁVAG	30	4	5	21	35	97	0.361	13

Source: rsssf.com

== Results ==
Home \ Away	CSE	DIM	ELE	FTC	GAM	KIS	KOL	LAM	MÁV	NAG	SAL	SZA	SZV	SZO	ÚJP	ÚJV
Csepel		1–0	2–1	3–2	0–3	7–3	3–2	2–1	4–1	2–1	1–1	3–0	3–0	3–2	1–4	5–1
DiMÁVAG	3–6		2–3	3–2	5–2	3–5	0–3	1–0	3–1	0–4	4–2	4–6	7–2	2–3	1–0	3–3
Elektromos	0–0	3–3		1–1	0–6	1–0	7–1	6–1	0–2	1–2	2–2	0–1	6–0	1–2	2–3	4–2
Ferencváros	0–0	2–2	1–3		5–3	11–5	4–2	9–2	9–0	3–1	6–0	0–5	10–2	4–2	3–3	13–2
Gamma	4–8	1–1	3–1	2–5		3–2	1–0	2–4	3–0	0–3	1–1	2–4	4–2	1–3	0–3	4–0
Kispest	3–4	3–3	2–1	1–5	0–2		2–1	1–3	6–2	2–4	2–3	2–2	2–2	2–7	1–5	3–1
Kolozsvár	3–3	0–2	3–3	1–5	2–1	2–3		2–1	1–1	2–5	1–3	2–2	2–1	1–6	1–1	0–0
Lampart	2–5	1–2	0–3	1–9	1–4	3–2	3–1		1–0	3–2	1–2	0–3	1–3	3–3	0–2	1–2
MÁVAG	2–6	0–7	1–2	1–2	0–6	1–2	1–2	2–2		1–7	2–0	2–6	2–0	2–1	0–2	0–3
Nagyvárad	1–3	2–2	7–0	4–1	3–2	0–1	3–5	6–2	1–1		1–1	2–2	7–0	2–1	0–7	5–2
Salgótarján	3–3	2–1	1–1	4–4	4–1	3–1	1–5	1–3	7–3	1–5		2–2	5–2	2–4	1–4	3–1
Szegedi AK	0–4	3–1	1–1	3–2	1–2	1–3	8–1	8–0	1–1	0–0	3–2		8–1	4–2	1–2	9–2
Szegedi VSE	1–4	2–2	4–3	2–1	3–4	1–4	0–3	2–1	4–3	2–2	1–4	1–4		1–5	1–4	1–3
Szolnok	1–0	3–2	2–1	2–1	4–0	1–2	2–0	5–1	4–0	1–1	4–4	2–2	2–0		2–1	8–0
Újpest	3–3	2–2	5–4	6–2	1–2	6–0	5–2	3–3	2–2	4–0	3–1	2–2	4–0	4–4		4–0
Újvidéki AC	1–3	1–1	0–2	3–2	1–3	1–2	1–0	0–3	3–1	0–0	5–1	3–3	3–1	2–1	1–0	

Source: rsssf.com
Legend: Blue = home team win; Yellow = draw; Red = away team win.

== See also ==
- 1941–42 Nemzeti Bajnokság II
- 1941–42 Nemzeti Bajnokság III
