= Gamma FC =

Hungarian football club

- Full name: Gamma Football Club
- Founded: 1929
- Dissolved: 1950
- Ground: Siketek pálya
- Capacity: 1,000 (168 seated)
Home colours	Away colours

Gamma FC was a Hungarian football club from the town of Budafok. It was dissolved when Budafok was incorporated into the city of Budapest in 1950.

== History ==
The club was financed by the Gamma Finommechanikai és Optikai Művek Részvénytársaság. Key people were the Juhász brothers István and Zoltán Juhász.

Tibor Nyilasi spent his childhood next to the Gamma stadium.

== Name changes ==
- 1929–1938: Gammagyár
- 1938–1939: Szentimrevárosi SE (SZISE)
- 1939–1944: Gamma FC
- 1945–1946: Budai Barátság SE
- 1946: Budai Munkás SE
- 1947–1949: MATEOSZ Munkás SE
- 1949–1950: Budapesti Teherfuvar SE

== Honours ==
=== League ===
- Nemzeti Bajnokság II:
  - Winners (1): 1946–47

== Seasons ==
The table below shows the seasons of Gamma FC.

Season	Tier	Club's name	Position	Pts
1932–33	2	Budafok FC	9 / 14	24
1933–34	2	Budafok FC	4 / 14	32
1934–35	2	Budafok FC	1 / 13	44
1935–36	1	Budafok FC	10 / 14	21
1936–37	1	Budafok FC	11 / 14	21
1937–38	1	Budafok FC	10 / 14	22
1938–39	1	Budafok FC	7 / 14	25
1939–40	1	Gamma FC	8 / 14	26
1940–41	1	Gamma FC	9 / 14	23
1941–42	1	Gamma FC	7 / 16	32
1942–43	1	Gamma FC	4 / 16	36
1943–44	1	Gamma FC	4 / 16	35
1944–45	1	Gamma FC	4 / 12	12
1944–45	1	Gamma FC	12 / 16	3
1945	1	Budai Barátság	8 / 12	20
1945–46	1	Budai Barátság	13 / 14	14
1946–47	2	MATEOSz Munkás SE	1 / 14	46
1947–48	1	MATEOSZ MSE	8 / 17	31
1948–49	1	MATEOSZ MSE	8 / 16	29
1949–50	1	Teherfuvar MSE	8 / 16	31

== Managers ==
- (Hungary) József Ember (1945–46)
- (Hungary) Tivadar Király (1946–47)
- (Hungary) Péter Szabó (1948–49)
- (Hungary) Imre Hermann (1949–50)
