= Elektromos FC =

Hungarian football club

- Full name: Elektromos Futball Club
- Founded: 1921
- Dissolved: 1999
- Ground: Elektromos pálya
- Capacity: 2,122 (1,000 seated)
Home colours	Away colours

Elektromos Futball Club was a Hungarian football club from the town of Budapest.

== History ==
Elektromos FC debuted in the 1936–37 season of the Hungarian League and finished ninth.

== Name Changes ==
- 1921–1936: Budapest Székesfőváros Elektromos Műveinek Testedző Egyesülete
- 1936–1944: Elektromos FC
- 1944–1945: Elektromos MTE
- 1945–1951: Elektromos Munkás Sportegyesület
- 1948: merger with Kelenföldi Elektromos
- 1950: merger with Phöbus FC
- 1951–1957: Vasas Elektromos SK
- 1957–1999: Elektromos SE

== Honours ==
- Nemzeti Bajnokság II
  - Winners (2): 1945, 1946–47

== Seasons ==
The table below shows the seasons of Elektromos FC.

Season	Tier	Club's name	Position	Pts
1928–29	5	Elektromos Művek TE	1 / 12	43
1929–30	4	Elektromos MTE	1 / 12	40
1930–31	3	Elektromos MTE	1 / 14	46
1931–32	2	Elektromos MTE	8 / 14	23
1932–33	2	Elektromos MTE	3 / 15	40
1933–34	2	Elektromos MTE	1 / 12	36
1934–35	2	Elektromos MTE	2 / 12	38
1935–36	2	Elektromos MTE	1 / 13	35
1936–37	1	Elektromos MTE	7 / 14	28
1937–38	1	Elektromos MTE	5 / 14	28
1938–39	1	Elektromos MTE	10 / 14	21
1939–40	1	Budapesti Elektromos TE	7 / 14	27
1940–41	1	Budapesti Elektromos TE	7 / 14	27
1941–42	1	Budapesti Elektromos TE	10 / 16	27
1942–43	1	Budapesti Elektromos TE	13 / 16	25
1943–44	1	Budapesti Elektromos TE	15 / 16	20
1944–45	2	Budapesti Elektromos TE	0 / 12	
1944–45	1	Budapesti Elektromos TE	8 / 12	10
1945	2	Elektromos MTE	1 / 12	37
1945–46	1	Elektromos Munkás SE	20 / 10	9
1945–46	1	Elektromos Munkás SE	9 / 14	22
1946–47	2	Elektromos Munkás SE	1 / 14	45
1947–48	1	Elektromos MSE	13 / 17	22
1948–49	2	Elektromos Munkás SE	11 / 16	27
1949–50	2	Elektromos MSE	10 / 16	28
1950	2	Elektromos Munkás SE	7 / 16	16
1951	2	Vasas Elektromos	6 / 14	28
1952	2	Vasas Elektromos	15 / 18	28
1953	3	Vasas Elektromos	7 / 16	29
1954	3	Vasas Elektromos	4 / 16	38
1955	3	Vasas Elektromos	4 / 16	42
1956	3	Vasas Elektromos SK	2 / 14	35
1957	3	Elektromos	1 / 8	24
1957–58	3	Elektromos Művek TE	1 / 16	46
1958–59	3	Elektromos	2 / 16	41
1959–60	3	Elektromos SE	1 / 16	45
1960–61	2	Elektromos SE	15 / 16	24
1961–62	3	Elektromos SE	9 / 16	32
1962–63	3	Elektromos	6 / 16	32
1963	4	Elektromos SE	8 / 16	15
1964	4	Elektromos	10 / 16	27
1965	4	Elektromos SE	3 / 16	38
1966	4	Budapesti Elektromos SE	4 / 16	40
1967	4	Elektromos SE	5 / 16	33
1968	4	Elektromos SE	8 / 16	28
1969	4	Elektromos SE	12 / 16	28
1970	4	Elektromos SE	3 / 16	21
1970–71	4	Elektromos SE	6 / 16	29
1971–72	4	Elektromos SE	15 / 16	19
1972–73	5	Elektromos	9 / 16	27
1973–74	5	Elektromos SE	8 / 16	30
1974–75	5	Elektromos	11 / 16	28
1975–76	5	Elektromos	5 / 16	37
1976–77	5	Elektromos SE	5 / 16	36
1977–78	5	Elektromos SE	2 / 16	45
1978–79	4	Elektromos SE	3 / 16	42
1979–80	4	Elektromos SE	5 / 16	34
1980–81	4	Elektromos SE	8 / 16	32
1981–82	5	Elektromos SE	7 / 16	29
1982–83	5	Elektromos SE	11 / 16	26
1983–84	5	Elektromos SE	8 / 16	31
1984–85	5	Elektromos SE	2 / 16	46
1985–86	5	Elektromos SE	1 / 16	46
1986–87	4	Elektromos SE	12 / 16	25
1987–88	4	Elektromos SE	9 / 16	29
1988–89	4	Elektromos	14 / 16	21
1989–90	4	Elektromos	9 / 16	37
1990–91	4	Elektromos SE	14 / 16	24
1991–92	4	Elektromos	10 / 16	27
1992–93	4	Elektromos	2 / 16	45
1993–94	4	Elektromos SE	1 / 16	51
1994–95	3	Elektromos SE	5 / 16	43
1995–96	3	Elektromos SE	2 / 16	64
1996–97	3	Elektromos	4 / 16	57
1997–98	4	Elektromos	7 / 16	46
1998–99	4	Elektromos SE	16 / 16	11
