= Ferencvárosi TC (sports club) =

Sports club in Budapest, Hungary

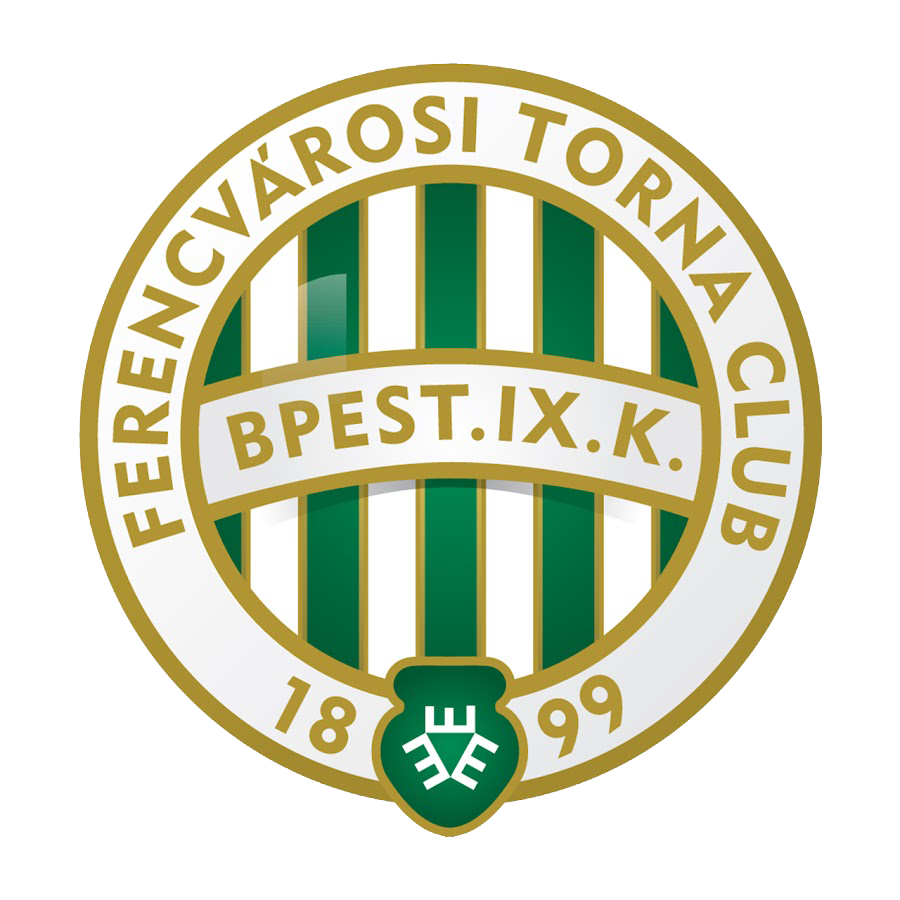
- Full name: Ferencvárosi Torna Club
- Nickname: Ferencváros, FTC and Fradi, Zöld Sasok (Green Eagles) zöld-fehérek (The green and whites)
- Short name: FTC
- Founded: 3 May 1899; 126 years ago
- Colours: Green and white
- Chairman: Gábor Kubatov
- Website: fradi.hu

Ferencvárosi Torna Club founded in 1899, is a major Hungarian multi-sport club based in Ferencváros district of Budapest, Hungary. The well-supported men's football team is the most popular team in the country. The parent multisport club Ferencvárosi TC divisions include a women's football club, a women's handball club, a men's futsal club, a men's ice hockey club, a men's handball club, a men's water polo club, and clubs for cycling, gymnastics, athletics, wrestling, curling and swimming, some of which are highly successful.

== Departments ==
As of 14 February 2023

=== Team sports ===
- Football:
  - Ferencvárosi TC men's football (since 1899)
  - Ferencvárosi TC (women's football) (since 2004)
- Handball:
  - Ferencvárosi TC (men's handball) (since 1950)
  - Ferencvárosi TC (women's handball) (since 1950)
- Water polo:
  - Ferencvárosi TC (men's water polo) (since 1904)
  - women's water polo
- Ice hockey:
  - Ferencvárosi TC (ice hockey) (since 1928)
  - women's ice hockey
- Nine-pin bowling (since 1948)
- Curling (since 2008)
- Synchronized swimming (since 2015)

=== Individual sports ===
- Ferencvárosi TC (athletics) (since 1903)
- Boxing (since 1910)
- Canoeing (since 1955)
- Cycling (since 1910)
- Gymnastics (since 1904)
- Fencing (1904–1915, 1922–1945, since 2017)
- Swimming (since 1904)
- Skating (since 2019)
- Triathlon (since 2015)
- Wrestling (since 1912)

=== Dissolved departments ===
- Basketball
  - Ferencvárosi TC (women's basketball) (1993–2000, 2010–2012)

== Sport facilities ==
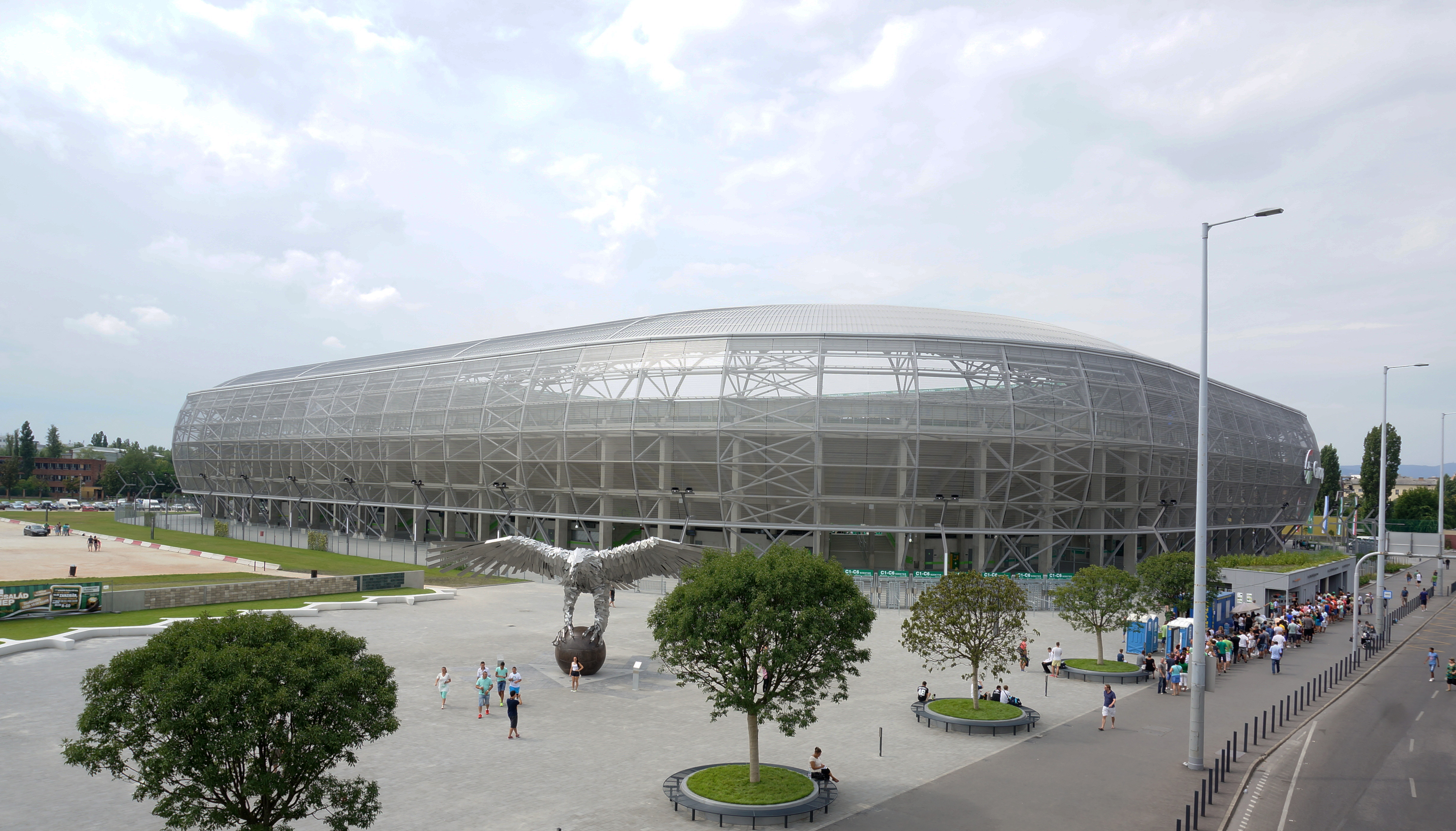
Ferencváros Stadion (2014–present)

The football team plays in Groupama Aréna in Ferencváros, Budapest. The handball teams play in the Elek Gyula Aréna. The boxing, cycling, fencing and wrestling departments play in the FTC-MVM Népligeti Sportközpont. The ice hockey team play in the Tüskecsarnok, the water polo team play at Komjádi Béla Sportuszoda, the women's football team play at Kocsis Sándor Sportközpont, the short track speed skating department play at Gyakorló Jégcsarnok, the curling team play at Kamaraerdei Curling Club, the canoeing department using facilities at ELTE Vízisporttelep.

== Supporters and rivalries ==
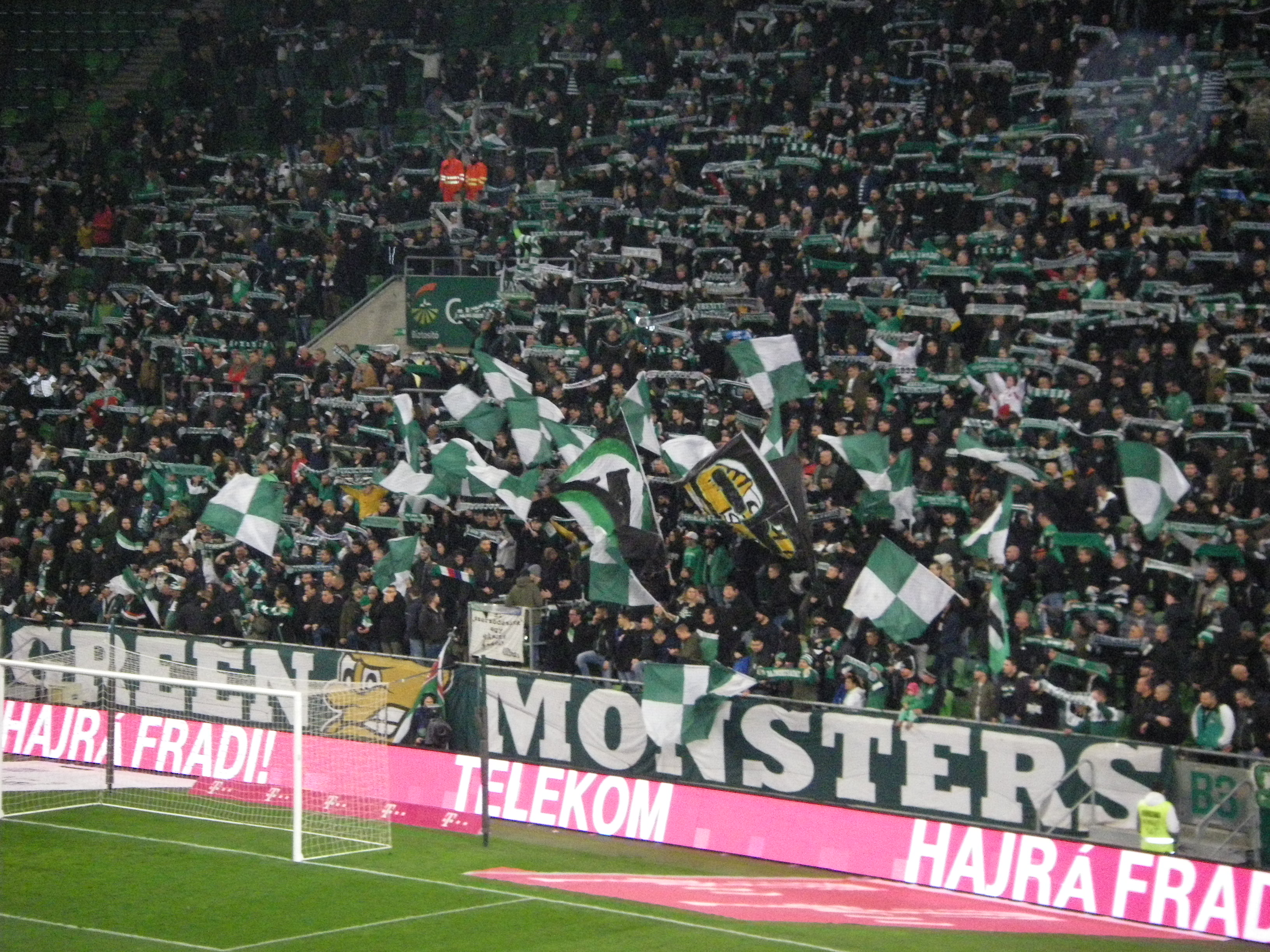
One of the supporter group of Ferencváros.

=== Supporters ===
Supporters of Ferencváros are mainly from the capital city of Hungary, Budapest. However, the club is popular all over Hungary.

==== Notable supporters ====
- László Aradszky, singer
- Fecó Balázs, singer and songwriter
- Imre Bajor, actor
- Zsolt Baumgartner, racing driver
- Gyula Bodrogi, actor
- István Bujtor, actor, director, producer and screenplay writer
- Zsuzsa Csala, actress
- Károly Eperjes, actor
- Bertalan Farkas, cosmonaut
- Tivadar Farkasházy, humorist, author, and journalist
- Károly Frenreisz, singer and songwriter
- Gyula Grosics, footballer
- László Helyey, actor
- Ferenc Karinthy, novelist, playwright, journalist, editor and translator
- Zoltán Kocsis, pianist, conductor and composer
- László Komár, singer
- János Koós, singer
- István Kovács, boxer
- Kati Kovács, singer, performer, lyricist and actress
- András Kozák, actor
- Peter Leko, chess player
- Péter Máté, singer, composer, and pianist
- Erika Miklósa, coloratura soprano
- Zoltán Mucsi, actor
- Feró Nagy, singer and musician
- Gyula Ortutay, ethnographer and politician
- András Rédli, fencer
- Imre Sinkovits, actor
- Gyula Szabó, actor
- István Tarlós, politician
- Gábor Wéber, racing driver and commentator

==== Friendships ====
The fans have friendships with fans of Rapid Wien and Panathinaikos, and as all three play in Green the alliance is nicknamed the "Green Brothers". They also have friendly relations in Hungary with fans of Zalaegerszeg and in Poland with Śląsk Wrocław and Bałtyk Gdynia.

=== Rivalries ===
Ferencváros have rivalry with several teams from Budapest including MTK Budapest, Újpest, Honvéd, Vasas SC, and several provincial clubs such as Debrecen and Diósgyőr.

The biggest rivalry is with Újpest, which dates back to the 1930s when Újpest won their first Hungarian Football League title. Since then, the fixture between the two teams attracts the most spectators in the domestic league. The matches between the two teams often end in violence which causes big trouble for the Hungarian football. The proposal of personal registration was refused by both clubs.

The fixture between Ferencváros and MTK Budapest FC is called the Örökrangadó or Eternal derby. It is the oldest football rivalry in Hungary, which dates back as early as the 1903 football season when Ferencváros first won the Hungarian League. In the following three decades either Ferencváros or MTK Budapest won the domestic league.

Bp. Honvéd are also considered fierce rivals as the clubs are in very close proximity to each other and in the past frequently competed for honours.

== Honours ==
=== Active departments ===
==== Football (men's) ====
- Hungarian Championship
  - Winners (35) (record): 1903, 1905, 1906–07, 1908–09, 1909–10, 1910–11, 1911–12, 1912–13, 1925–26, 1926–27, 1927–28, 1931–32, 1933–34, 1937–38, 1939–40, 1940–41, 1948–49, 1962–63, 1964, 1967, 1968, 1975–76, 1980–81, 1991–92, 1994–95, 1995–96, 2000–01, 2003–04, 2015–16, 2018–19, 2019–20, 2020–21, 2021–22, 2022–23, 2023–24
- Hungarian Second League
  - Winners (1): 2008–09
- Hungarian Cup
  - Winners (24) (record): 1912–13, 1921–22, 1926–27, 1927–28, 1932–33, 1934–35, 1941–42, 1942–43, 1943–44, 1955–58, 1971–72, 1973–74, 1975–76, 1977–78, 1990–91, 1992–93, 1993–94, 1994–95, 2002–03, 2003–04, 2014–15, 2015–16, 2016–17, 2021–22
- Hungarian Super Cup (defunct)
  - Winners (6) (record): 1993, 1994, 1995, 2004, 2015, 2016
- Hungarian League Cup (defunct)
  - Winners (2): 2012–13, 2014–15
- Inter-Cities Fairs Cup (defunct, predecessor of UEFA Cup)
  - Winners (1): 1964–65
- Mitropa Cup (defunct)
  - Winners (2): 1928, 1937
- Challenge Cup (defunct)
  - Winners (1): 1908–09

==== Water polo (men's) ====
- Hungarian Championship
  - Winners (26) (share record): 1910, 1911, 1912, 1913, 1918, 1919, 1920, 1921, 1922, 1925, 1926, 1927, 1944, 1956, 1962, 1963, 1965, 1968, 1987–88, 1989–90, 1999–00, 2017–18, 2018–19, 2021–22, 2022–23, 2023–24
- Hungarian Cup
  - Winners (23) (record): 1923, 1924, 1926, 1949, 1957, 1962, 1964, 1965, 1967, 1969, 1973, 1976, 1977, 1978, 1988–89, 1989–90, 1996, 2018, 2019, 2020, 2021, 2022, 2023
- LEN Champions League
  - Winners (1): 2018–19
- LEN Cup Winners' Cup (defunct)
  - Winners (4) (record): 1974–75, 1977–78, 1979–80, 1997–98
- LEN Super Cup
  - Winners (4): 1978, 1980, 2018, 2019
- LEN Euro Cup
  - Winners (2): 2016–17, 2017–18

==== Ice hockey (men's) ====
- Hungarian Championship:
  - Winners (31) (record): 1950–51, 1954–55, 1955–56, 1960–61, 1961–62, 1963–64, 1966–67, 1970–71, 1971–72, 1972–73, 1973–74, 1974–75, 1975–76, 1976–77, 1977–78, 1978–79, 1979–80, 1983–84, 1988–89, 1990–91, 1991–92, 1992–93, 1993–94, 1994–95, 1996–97, 2018–19, 2019–20, 2020–21, 2021–22, 2022–23, 2023–24
- Hungarian Cup:
  - Winners (15) (record): 1967–68, 1968–69, 1972–73, 1973–74, 1974–75, 1975–76, 1976–77, 1978–79, 1979–80, 1982–83, 1989–90, 1990–91, 1991–92, 1994–95, 2019–20
- Hungarian Super Cup:
  - Winners (3): 1993–94, 2020–21, 2022–23
- Panonian League:
  - Winners (1): 2002–03
- Erste Liga:
  - Winners (2): 2018–19, 2019–20

==== Handball (women's) ====
- Hungarian Championship
  - Winners (13): 1966, 1968, 1969, 1971, 1993–94, 1994–95, 1995–96, 1996–97, 1999–00, 2001–02, 2006–07, 2014–15, 2020–21
- Hungarian Cup
  - Winners (15): 1967, 1970, 1972, 1977, 1992–93, 1993–94, 1994–95, 1995–96, 1996–97, 2000–01, 2002–03, 2016–17, 2021–22, 2022–23, 2023–24
- EHF Cup Winners' Cup (defunct)
  - Winners (3) (record): 1977–78, 2010–11, 2011–12
- EHF Cup
  - Winner (1): 2005–06

==== Football (women's) ====
- Hungarian Championship
  - Winners (5): 2014–15, 2015–16, 2018–19, 2020–21, 2021–22
- Hungarian Cup
  - Winners (6) (record): 2015, 2016, 2017, 2018, 2019, 2021

==== Handball (men's) ====
- Hungarian Second League
  - Winners (3): 1970, 2008–09, 2016–17
- Hungarian Cup
  - Winner (1): 1963

=== Inactive departments ===
==== Basketball (women's) ====
- Hungarian Championship
  - Winner (1): 1996–97
- Hungarian Cup
  - Winner (1): 1995–96

=== International honours ===
| season | men's football | women's handball | men's water polo | men's handball |
|---|---|---|---|---|
| 1928 | Mitropa Cup Winners | | | |
| 1930 | Mitropa Cup Semi-finals | | | |
| 1934 | Mitropa Cup Semi-finals | | | |
| 1935 | Mitropa Cup Final | | | |
| 1937 | Mitropa Cup Winners | | | |
| 1938 | Mitropa Cup Final | | | |
| 1939 | Mitropa Cup Final | | | |
| 1940 | Mitropa Cup Final | | | |
| 1962–63 | Inter-Cities Fairs Cup Semi-finals | | | |
| 1964–65 | Inter-Cities Fairs Cup Winners | | | |
| 1967–68 | Inter-Cities Fairs Cup Final | | | |
| 1970–71 | | European Cup Final | | |
| 1971–72 | UEFA Cup Semi-finals | | | |
| 1974–75 | Cup Winners' Cup Final | | Cup Winners' Cup Winners | |
| 1977–78 | | Cup Winners' Cup Winners | Cup Winners' Cup Winners | |
| 1978–79 | | Cup Winners' Cup Final | Cup Winners' Cup Final | |
| 1979–80 | | | Cup Winners' Cup Winners | |
| 1988–89 | Mitropa Cup Semi-finals | | European Cup Semi-finals | |
| 1993–94 | | Cup Winners' Cup Final | | |
| 1994–95 | | | LEN Cup Final | |
| 1995–96 | | Champions League Group stage (4th) | | |
| 1996–97 | | Champions League Semi-finals | LEN Cup Final | |
| 1997–98 | | | Cup Winners' Cup Winners | |
| 2000–01 | | Champions League Semi-finals | | |
| 2001–02 | | Champions League Final | | |
| 2004–05 | | EHF Cup Semi-finals | | |
| 2005–06 | | EHF Cup Winners | LEN Cup Semi-finals | |
| 2006–07 | | Cup Winners' Cup Semi-finals | | |
| 2010–11 | | Cup Winners' Cup Winners | | |
| 2011–12 | | Cup Winners' Cup Winners | | |
| 2014–15 | | Cup Winners' Cup Semi-finals | | |
| 2016–17 | | | Euro Cup Winners | |
| 2017–18 | | | Euro Cup Winners | |
| 2018–19 | | | Champions League Winners | |
| 2020–21 | | | Champions League Final | |
| 2021–22 | | | Champions League Third place | |
| 2022–23 | | Champions League Final | | |
| 2023–24 | | | | European Cup Semi-finals |

== Notable former players ==
=== Olympic champions ===
A Ferencvárosi Torna Club olimpiai bajnokainak listája

- Antal Kocsis, boxing
- István Molnár, water polo
- Jenő Dalnoki, football
- Dezső Fábián, water polo
- György Kárpáti, water polo
- Éva Novák, swimming
- Ilona Novák, swimming
- Miklós Szilvási, wrestling (Greco-Roman)
- Károly Szittya, water polo
- Katalin Szőke, swimming
- Miklós Ambrus, water polo
- László Felkai, water polo
- Dezső Gyarmati, water polo
- Dezső Novák, football
- Zoltán Varga, football
- Mihály Hesz, canoe sprint
- István Juhász, football
- Miklós Páncsics, football
- Lajos Szűcs, football
- Zoltán Magyar, gymnastics
- György Gerendás, water polo
- András Sike, wrestling (Greco-Roman)
- (Nigeria) Teslim Fatusi, football
- Zoltán Kósz, water polo
- Bulcsú Székely, water polo
- Danuta Kozák, canoe sprint
- Shaoang Liu, short track speed skating

== Presidents ==
List of the presidents of the Ferencvárosi TC:

- 1899–1920: Ferenc Springer
- 1920–1923: Aladár Mattyók
- 1923–1931: Ernő Gschwindt
- 1931–1944: Béla Mailinger (executive president)
- 1937–1944: Béla Usetty
- 1944: Andor Jaross
- 1945–1950: Adolf Nádas (executive president)
- 1948–1950: Ferenc Münnich
- 1950–1951: Árpád Nöhrer
- 1951–1952: István Száraz
- 1953–1955: Béla Komoretto
- 1956–1958: Károly Weidemann
- 1958–1962: János Bédi
- 1962–1965: Aladár Végh
- 1966–1971: István Kalmár
- 1971–1981: János Harót (executive president)
- 1971–1980: Lajos Lénárt
- 1980–1985: Tibor Losonci (executive president)
- 1981–1988: Imre Kovács
- 1985–1990: Károly Hargitai (executive president)
- 1988–1989: Ferenc Szabó
- 1989–1990: István Debreczeny
- 1990–1994: Lajos Harza
- 1991–1998: István Szívós (executive president)
- 1994–1997: Péter Szerdahelyi
- 1997–1998: Benedek Fülöp
- 1998–2001: József Torgyán
- 1999: Máté Fenyvesi (executive president)
- 2001–2006: János Furulyás
- 2006: Miklós Inácsy
- 2006–2007: Zsolt Dámosy
- 2007–2010: György Rieb
- 2010–2011: Miklós Kovács
- since 2011: Gábor Kubatov
