= History of MTK Budapest FC =

Magyar Testgyakorlók Köre Budapest Futball Club is a professional football club based in Budapest, Hungary.

== Foundation ==
About a dozen sport-loving citizens decided on 16 November 1888 in a cafe in Budapest to form the Magyar Testgyakorlók Köre (Circle of Hungarian Fitness Activists). A number of its founding members were aristocrats and members of the capital's Jewish community. The colours of the club became blue and white, and it had 31 members by the end of its inaugural year. The club's first divisions offered sporting possibilities only for fencing and gymnastics. As football was spreading far and wide in Hungary also the club established its football division on 12 March 1901. The first public football match of the Blues was a 0–0 draw against Budapesti TC, which later became Hungarian champions in 1901 and 1902. MTK started to play football in the 2nd league in 1902, but a year later the club got the chance to play in the first league. The first year brought the club a 3rd place and it did not take long for the Blues to win the first championship, which happened a year later in 1904.

== 1900s ==
MTK won their first Hungarian League title in the 1904 Nemzeti Bajnokság I season. They won 11 matches and drew three times and lost only twice.

MTK's second Hungarian League title was won in the 1907–08 Nemzeti Bajnokság I season. MTK won the league without losing any matches.

== 1910s ==
The 1910s was a successful period for the club since they won the Hungarian League five times. MTK Budapest finished first in the 1913–14 Nemzeti Bajnokság I season. Out of the 18 matches MTK managed to win 15 and drew only three times.

In the 1916–17 Nemzeti Bajnokság I season MTK finished first. MTK won 21 out of 22 matches and lost to Törekvés SE.

In the 1917–18 Nemzeti Bajnokság I season MTK finished first again. In this season MTK could win 21 out of 22 matches and overtook their arch-rival Ferencvárosi TC.

In the 1918–19 Nemzeti Bajnokság I season MTK finished first. MTK could overtake Ferencvárosi TC and Újpest FC.

Vilmos Kertész played for MTK at the inside right and midfield positions from 1908 to 1924. He played alongside his two brothers, Gyula and Adolf.

Adolf Kertész played left midfielder for MTK between 1909 and 1920, scoring 19 goals in 148 league matches, and winning the Hungarian League championship with MTK four times (1913–14, 1916–17, 1917–18, and 1919–20), and the 1909–10 Hungarian Cup.

== Amateur era ==
The first president of the club became a well-to-do entrepreneur, his vice a close friend of his who turned out to be an excellent sport-oriented organiser. His name was Alfréd Brüll, and he became the club's legendary and respected president from 1905 until the 1940s. Before the introduction of professional football, MTK was the most successful Hungarian team. Prior to the Second World War the team won 15 Hungarian League titles and gained 7 Hungarian Cup victories. During the professional era the team could not repeat the same performance but still won two championships. Béla Guttmann was a prominent member of the team in the early 1920s. Playing halfback or center half alongside Gyula Mándi, he helped MTK win Hungarian League titles in 1920 and 1921. Due to the participation of many Jewish figures in the club, it had the reputation of being a "Jewish" team beginning in the 1930s and 1940s, a phenomenon that continues to the present.

== Professional era ==
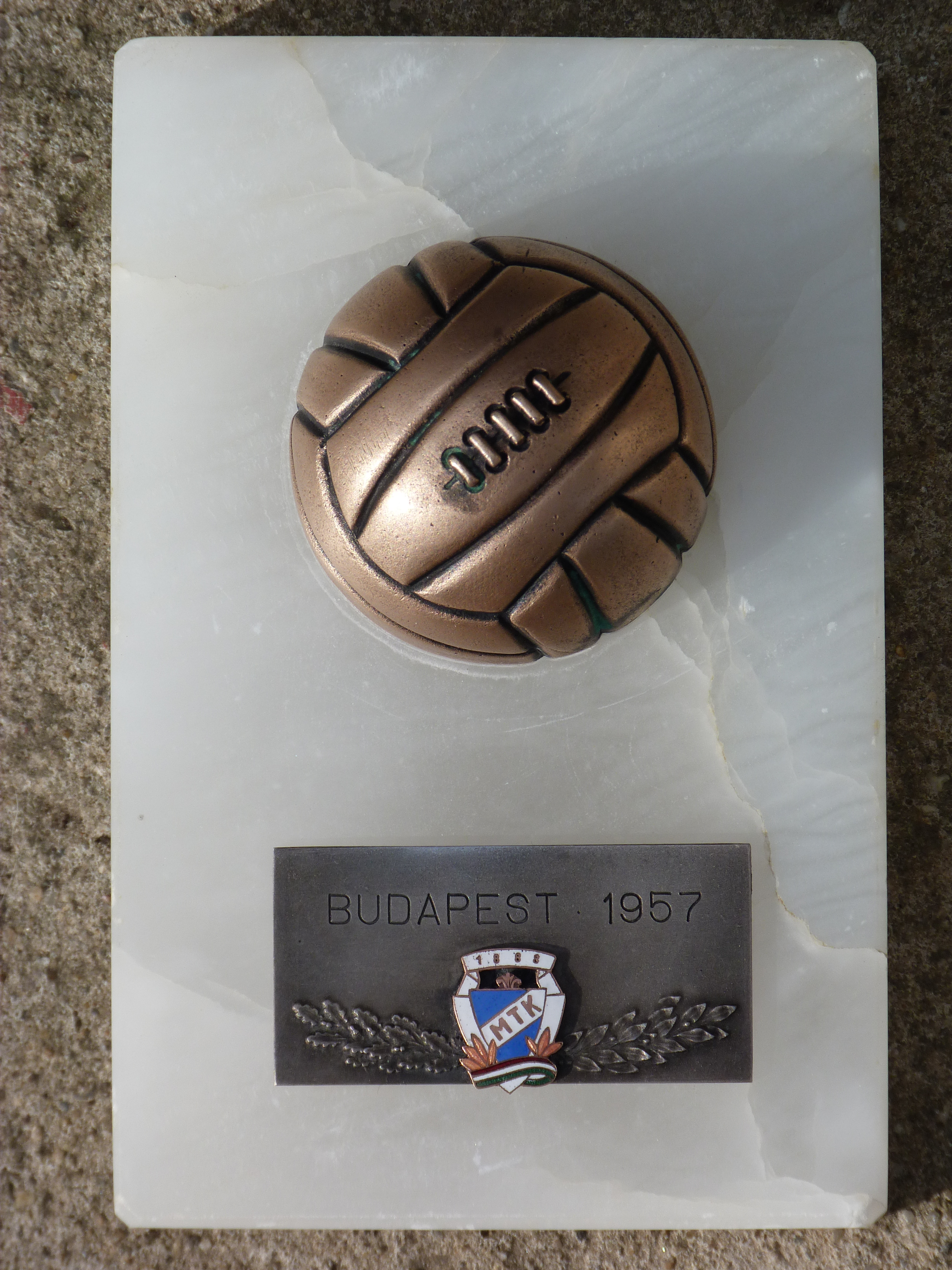
The memory board of the 1957-season Hungarian League

The Mighty Magyar Era

In 1949 when Hungary became a communist state, MTK were taken over by the secret police, the ÁVH, and subsequently the club became known as Textiles SE. They then became Bástya SE, then Vörös Lobogó SE, which means Red Banner or Red Flag, and then finally back to MTK. Despite this turmoil, the 1950s proved a successful era for the club and with a team coached by Márton Bukovi and including Péter Palotás, Nándor Hidegkuti, Mihály Lantos and József Zakariás, they won three Hungarian League titles, a Hungarian Cup and a Mitropa Cup. In 1955, as Vörös Lobogó SE, they also became the first ever Hungarian team to play in a European Cup. On 7 September 1955 at the Népstadion, Palotás scored a hat-trick as they beat Anderlecht 6–3 in the first leg of the first round and thus became the first player to score a hat-trick in a European Cup game.

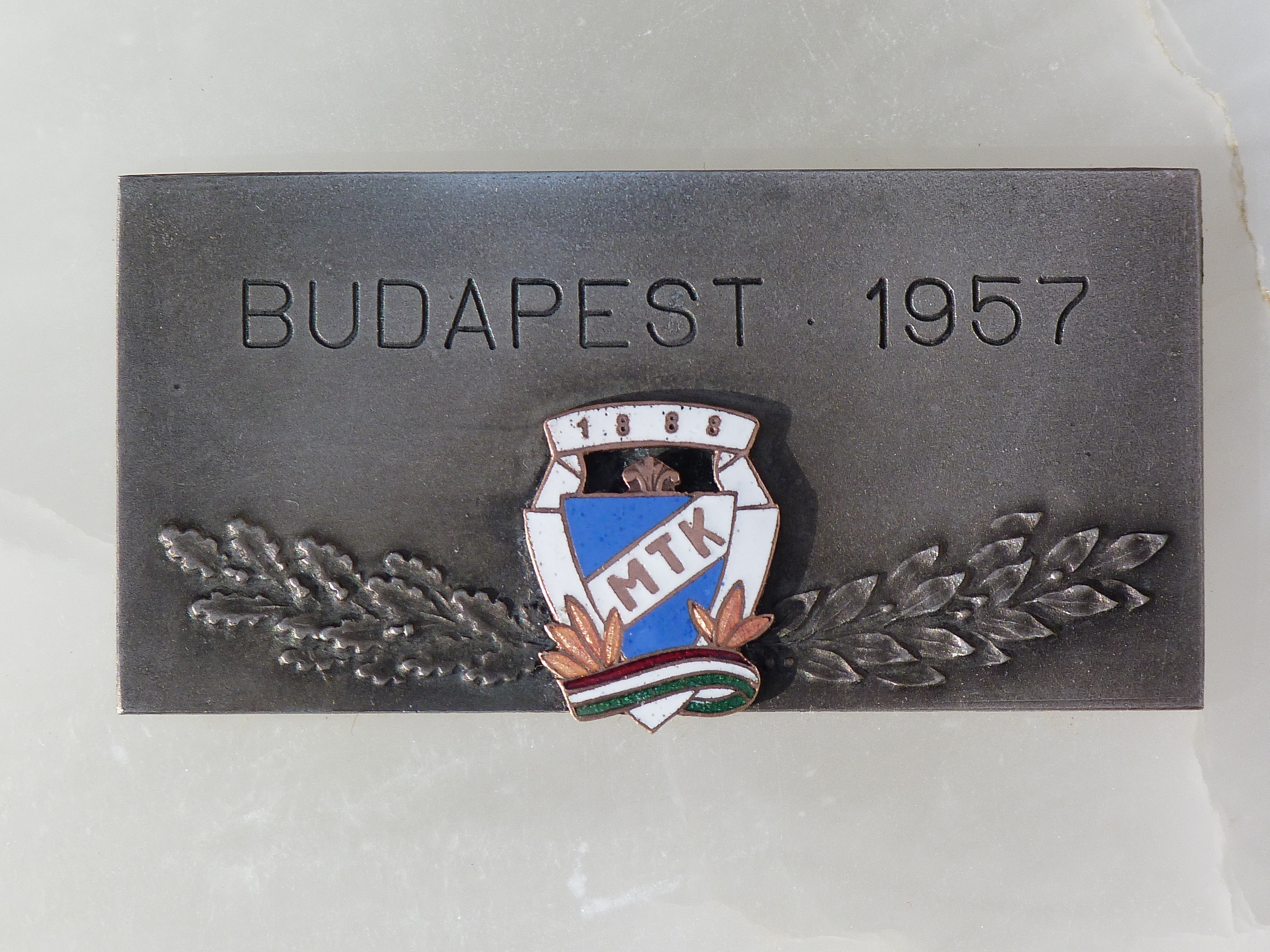
Spring Cup 1957

MTK also played a major role in the success of the legendary Hungary team known as the Mighty Magyars. While Budapest Honvéd provided the team with a nucleus of players, it was Márton Bukovi at MTK who developed the vital 4–2–4 formation, later adopted by national coach Gusztáv Sebes, himself a former MTK player. It was also at MTK that Bukovi together with, Péter Palotás and Nándor Hidegkuti, also pioneered the crucial deep lying centre-forward position. In 1953 Hidegkuti would exploit this position to great effect as he scored a hat-trick for Hungary when they beat England 6–3 at Wembley Stadium. In addition Mihály Lantos and József Zakariás provided the Mighty Magyars with a solid defence. During the early 1950s these MTK players helped Hungary become Olympic Champions in 1952, Central European Champions in 1953, they defeated England at Wembley 6-3, and won the return leg in Budapest 7-1 a year later. They also reached the 1954 World Cup final. They absorbed Vörös Meteor Egyetértés SK after the first half of 1974–75 season. They were relegated to the Second League twice in 1980–81 season after finishing 17th or second from last and in 1993–94 season after finishing 16th or last.

== 1960s and the European Cup Winners' Final ==
In the 1960s MTK Budapest did not win Hungarian League titles only the Hungarian Cup in 1968. In the 1962–63 season of the Hungarian League MTK finished second which resulted the participation in the European Cup Winners Cup in the following year. In the 1963–64 season of the European Cup Winners' Cup MTK Budapest reached the final. MTK Budapest beat Slavia Sofia in the preliminary round, FSV Zwickau in the first round, Fenerbahçe in the quarter-finals, the Scottish Celtic in the semi-finals and lost to Sporting CP in the final after extra time. After this success MTK Budapest were not able to finish in the best three of the Hungarian League in the 1960s.

== The 2000s ==
MTK Budapest won the Nemzeti Bajnokság I 2002-03 season. Therefore, they were eligible to enter the 2003–04 UEFA Champions League. In the second qualifying round MTK Budapest beat HJK Helsinki 3–2 on aggregate. The first match was won by MTK 3–1 at home. The second leg was won by Helsinki 1–0. However, in the third qualifying round the Scottish Celtic demolished them by beating MTK 5–0 on aggregate. The first match was played in the Puskás Ferenc Stadium and MTK lost to 4–0. In Glasgow Celtic beat MTK 1–0. On 2 July 2003 it was announced that István Pisont would join the club on free transfer. On the same week MTK signed star Sándor Torghelle from relegated Budapest Honvéd. MTK Budapest won the Hungarian Super Cup trophy after beating 2–0 archrivals Ferencváros in the final.

MTK Budapest won the 2007–08 season of the Hungarian League.

== The 2010s ==
In the 2010–11 season of the Hungarian League, MTK Budapest finished 15th, which resulted in its relegation from the first league. In the 2011–12 season, MTK Budapest finished first in the second division and was promoted back to the first division of the Hungarian League. Moreover, in the 2011–12 Hungarian Cup, MTK Budapest made the final, where they lost to Debrecen in a penalty shoot-out. As a consequence of reaching the final, MTK Budapest qualified for the UEFA Europa League 2012–13.

In the 2014–15 Nemzeti Bajnokság I MTK Budapest finished third and qualified for the 2015–16 UEFA Europa League. In the first qualifying round MTK Budapest drew (0–0) with FK Vojvodina at the Szusza Ferenc Stadium, Budapest on 2 July 2015. In the second leg MTK was beaten by Vojvodina 3–1 at the Karađorđe Stadium, in Novi Sad, Serbia on 9 July 2015.

In the 2015–16 Nemzeti Bajnokság I MTK Budapest finished fourth and qualified for the 2016–17 UEFA Europa League. In the first round of the Europa League MTK Budapest drew with Kazakh FC Aktobe at the Central Stadium in Aktobe, Kazakhstan on 30 June 2016. In the second leg MTK Budapest beat Aktobe 2–0 at the Ménfői út, Győr on 7 July 2016.

On 12 March 2019 Tamás Lucsánszky was appointed as the manager of the [MTK Budapest after Tamás Feczkó's removal. In an interview with the club, Lucsánszky said that he had been working for 20 years to get this opportunity. He also admitted that he is an MTK supporter. His debut match ended with a 3–2 defeat against Puskás Akadémia FC at the Pancho Aréna on the 25th match day of the 2018–19 Nemzeti Bajnokság I.

In the 2018–19 Nemzeti Bajnokság I season MTK Budapest finished 11th and they were relegated to the Nemzeti Bajnokság II.

== 2020s ==
On 14 May 2023, MTK beat Kazincbarcika 1–0 and were promoted to the first division after securing a second place in the 2022–23 Nemzeti Bajnokság II season. On 24 January 2026, Máté Pinezits debuted with a 3–2 victory over Kisvárda FC at the Várkerti Stadion in the 2025–26 Nemzeti Bajnokság I season.

On 3 November 2026, Máté Pinezits resigned from his position as manager of the club.

On 16 November 2026, Imre Szabics was appointed as the manager of the club. On 21 November 2026, Szabics debuted with a 2–1 victory over Puskás Akadémia FC at the Pancho Aréna in the 2026–27 Nemzeti Bajnokság I.
