= Jenő Medgyessy =

Hungarian football manager

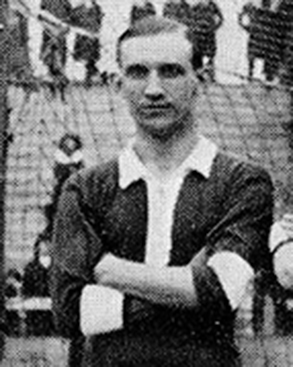

Personal information
- Full name: Jenő Medgyessy (Eugênio Marinetti in Brazil)
- Date of birth: 23 December 1889
- Place of birth: Géderlak, Austro-Hungarian Empire
- Date of death: 17 November 1973 (aged 83)
- Place of death: Monaco
- Position: Midfielder

Senior career*
Years	Team	Apps	(Gls)
1909–1917	Ferencváros	47	(0)

Managerial career
- 1926: Botafogo
- 1927: Botafogo
- 1927–1928: Fluminense
- 1928: Atlético Mineiro
- 1929: Palmeiras
- 1930–1931: Atlético Mineiro
- 1932: Palmeiras
- 1932–1933: São Paulo
- 1933: San Lorenzo
- 1933–1934: Racing
- 1935: River Plate
- * Club domestic league appearances and goals as of 6 February 2024

Jenő Medgyessy (13 December 1889 – 17 November 1973), also known in Brazil as Eugênio Marinetti or Eugenio Medgyessy, was a Hungarian footballer and manager.

== Playing career ==
As a player, Medgyessy spent his entire professional career at Fenecváros TC, playing from 1909 to 1917, making 47 appearances and winning the Hungarian national championship four times.

== Managerial career ==
Disciple of Jimmy Hogan, an Englishman of Irish descent who introduced the Scottish style based on the pass to Hungary, he emigrated to Brazil due to the presence of several childhood friends who had moved to the country. He arrived in Rio de Janeiro, where he worked at the two main clubs at the time, Botafogo and Fluminense. After this, Megdyessy also became the first foreign coach in the history of Atlético Mineiro. At Palestra Itália, he was to beat his former club Fenencváros in the team's trip to Brazil.

His last job was coaching Arthur Friedenreich São Paulo FC, where he stayed for just 13 matches. He ended up moving to Argentina, after gaining a reputation in Brazilian sports media as a coach who demanded too much from his players in training. There Medgyessy trained San Lorenzo, Racing and River Plate.

== Honours ==
=== Player ===
Ferencváros

- Nemzeti Bajnokság I: 1909–10, 1910–11, 1911–12, 1912–13
- Magyar Kupa: 1912–13
