= Imre Schlosser =

Hungarian footballer (1889–1959)

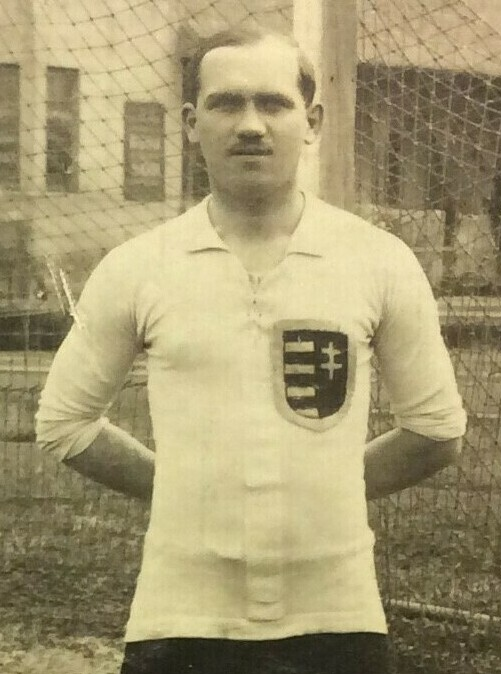
- Schlosser in 1923

Personal information
- Full name: Imre Schlosser-Lakatos
- Date of birth: 11 October 1889
- Place of birth: Budapest, Kingdom of Hungary
- Date of death: 18 July 1959 (aged 69)
- Place of death: Budapest, Hungary
- Position: Forward

Senior career*
Years	Team	Apps	(Gls)
1905–1916	Ferencvárosi TC	155	(258)
1916–1922	MTK Hungária FC	125	(141)
1925–1926	Wiener AC	17	(6)
1926–1927	Ferencvárosi TC	14	(11)
1927–1928	Budai 33	9	(1)
Total		320	(417)

International career
1906–1927	Hungary	68	(59)

Managerial career
- 1922–1923: Vívó és Atlétikai Club
- 1923–1924: IFK Norrköping
- 1924–1925: Wisła Kraków
- 1925–1926: Wiener AC
- 1925–1926: Brigittenauer AC
- * Club domestic league appearances and goals

Imre Schlosser (also known as Imre Lakatos; 11 October 1889 – 18 July 1959) was a Hungarian footballer of Danube Swabian ancestry who played as a forward. He still holds the record as the highest goalscorer in the history of the Hungarian National Championship. He was also the first player from outside the British Isles to break the record of most association football international caps.

== Club career ==
The son of János Schlosser and Mária Kettner, he had two elder brothers, János and József, who were both members of Ferencvárosi TC. Following in his brothers' footsteps, he made his debut at the age of 17, on 25 February 1906, against Postás (0-1). His game was not yet appropriate, so he returned to the second team to strengthen for 3 months. He was on the first team again in the fall, and this time, he showed his potential and soon became a regular member of the team. Schlosser played eight seasons in green and white (1906 - 1915), of which he was champion six times and the top goal scorer of the league six times in a row, scoring a total of 258 league goals in 155 league matches. He also won one Hungarian Cup in 1912-13, in which he scored the winning goal in the final.

Remarkably, he also topped the European top scoring list four times in a row, in the 1910-11 (42), 1911-12 (40) and 1912-13 (42) and 1913-14 (36) seasons, making him the first-ever player to be Europe's top scorer four times, a record that was later equalled only by the great Josef Bican and Lionel Messi. After an argument with the FTC management team, he signed with the club's biggest rival MTK, and with them, he was the champion of Hungary a further 6 times. He then spent a season at Wiener AC in Austria before returning to Ferencvárosi to help them to a double, winning both the league and cup.

In his club career, Schlosser reportedly scored 417 league goals, a number believed to be the sixth highest of all-time in European top leagues. He managed IFK Norrköping.

== International career ==
Schlosser made his debut for Hungary on 7 October 1906, aged 16 years and 361 days, in a 4–4 draw with Bohemia. In a national team career that would last more than 20 years, Schlosser played 68 times for Hungary (the team won 70% of the games in which they fielded Schlosser) and scored 59 goals, a ratio of 0.87 goals per match. The first of which came on 4 November 1906, aged 17 years and 24 days, in a 3–1 win over Austria. He scored 5 hat-tricks for Hungary against the likes of Austria, France, Switzerland, Germany and Russia, the most notable of which being the one against Germany, because it handed his nation a 3–1 win in the 1912 Summer Olympics – Consolation tournament semi-finals, and Hungary went on to beat Austria in the final, where Schlosser scored the opening goal in a 3–0 win.

Schlosser was the first footballer to score 50 international goals, achieving the feat when he scored a brace (two goals) in a 6–2 victory against Austria on 3 June 1917.

=== International ===
Hungary national team
Year	Apps	Goals
1906	2	1
1907	4	0
1908	4	3
1909	5	7
1910	3	2
1911	7	12
1912	10	16
1913	3	1
1914	5	3
1915	4	2
1916	3	2
1917	5	4
1918	4	3
1919	1	0
1920	1	0
1921	4	2
1926	2	0
1927	1	0
Total	68	58

== Honours ==
Ferencvárosi TC

- Hungarian League: 1906–07, 1908–09, 1909–10, 1910–11, 1911–12, 1912–13, 1926–27
- Hungarian Cup: 1912–13, 1926–27
- Challenge Cup: 1908–09

MTK Hungária FC

- Hungarian League: 1916–17, 1917–18, 1918–19, 1919–20, 1920–21, 1921–22

=== Individual ===
- Hungarian Top Scorer: 1909, 1910, 1911, 1912, 1913, 1914, 1917
- European Top Scorer: 1911, 1912, 1913, 1914

== See also ==
- List of men's footballers with 50 or more international goals
- List of footballers with 500 or more goals
