= 1922–23 Nemzeti Bajnokság II =

Nemzeti Bajnokság II
- Season: 1922–23
- Champions: Újpesti Törekvés SE
- Promoted: Újpesti Törekvés SE; 33 FC

The 1922–23 Nemzeti Bajnokság II season was the 23rd edition of the Nemzeti Bajnokság II.

== League table ==
| Pos | Team | Pld | W | D | L | GF | GA | GD | Pts | Promotion or relegation |
|---|---|---|---|---|---|---|---|---|---|---|
| 1 | Újpesti Törekvés SE | 28 | 20 | 5 | 3 | 54 | 21 | +33 | 45 | Promotion to Nemzeti Bajnokság I |
| 2 | 33 FC | 28 | 19 | 5 | 4 | 53 | 15 | +38 | 43 | Promotion to Nemzeti Bajnokság I |
| 3 | Budapesti Egyetemi AC | 28 | 17 | 6 | 5 | 66 | 23 | +43 | 40 | |
| 4 | Budapesti AK | 28 | 12 | 7 | 9 | 29 | 32 | −3 | 31 | |
| 5 | Nemzeti SC | 28 | 14 | 2 | 12 | 51 | 39 | +12 | 30 | |
| 6 | Ékszerészek SC | 28 | 12 | 6 | 10 | 30 | 28 | +2 | 30 | |
| 7 | Húsiparosok SC | 28 | 9 | 10 | 9 | 43 | 49 | −6 | 28 | |
| 8 | Erzsébetfalvi MTK (Note: 1924. 01.01-n Erzsébetfalvát Pesterzsébet néven várossá nyilvánították, ezért új neve Erzsébeti Munkás Testedző Kör) | 28 | 11 | 4 | 13 | 29 | 34 | −5 | 26 | |
| 9 | Kereskedők Atlétikai OE (Note: 1923.02.15. előtt Kereskedelmi Alkalmazottak Országos Egyesülete) | 28 | 10 | 5 | 13 | 33 | 37 | −4 | 25 | |
| 10 | Terézvárosi TC | 28 | 9 | 6 | 13 | 38 | 46 | −8 | 24 | |
| 11 | Testvériség SE | 28 | 10 | 4 | 14 | 33 | 43 | −10 | 24 | |
| 12 | Postás SE | 28 | 8 | 7 | 13 | 24 | 38 | −14 | 23 | |
| 13 | Budapesti TK | 28 | 6 | 10 | 12 | 31 | 43 | −12 | 22 | Relegation |
| 14 | VII. kerületi SC (Note: 1923.07.21-én fúzionál a Zuglói Atlétikai Clubbal Zuglói VII. kerületi Atlétikai Club néven) | 28 | 7 | 4 | 17 | 31 | 51 | −20 | 18 | Relegation |
| 15 | Rákosszentmihályi TK (Note: MLSz-döntés alapján átkerült a Középmagyarországi kerület Pestkörnyéki alosztály I. osztályába) | 28 | 4 | 3 | 21 | 21 | 67 | −46 | 11 | Relegation |

== Countryside championships ==
=== Western district ===
| Pos | Team | Pld | W | D | L | GF | GA | GD | Pts |
|---|---|---|---|---|---|---|---|---|---|
| 1 | Szombathelyi AK | 16 | 11 | 2 | 3 | 42 | 14 | +28 | 24 |
| 2 | Szombathelyi SE | 16 | 11 | 1 | 4 | 35 | 15 | +20 | 23 |
| 3 | Nagykanizsai TE | 16 | 7 | 6 | 3 | 36 | 23 | +13 | 20 |
| 4 | MÁV Haladás Vasutas SE | 16 | 7 | 5 | 4 | 30 | 23 | +7 | 19 |
| 5 | Dunántúli AC | 16 | 6 | 7 | 3 | 24 | 20 | +4 | 19 |
| 6 | Győri Egyetértés TO | 16 | 6 | 3 | 7 | 24 | 27 | −3 | 15 |
| 7 | Soproni FAC | 16 | 6 | 3 | 7 | 22 | 33 | −11 | 15 |
| 8 | Hungária SE | 16 | 2 | 1 | 13 | 8 | 42 | −34 | 5 |
| 9 | Székesfehérvári TC | 16 | 1 | 2 | 13 | 22 | 47 | −25 | 2 (Note: 2 points deducted?) |
| 10 | Tatabányai SC (Note: Withdrew?) | 0 | - | - | - | - | - | — | 0 |

== See also ==
- 1922–23 Magyar Kupa
- 1922–23 Nemzeti Bajnokság I
