= List of international goals scored by Imre Schlosser =

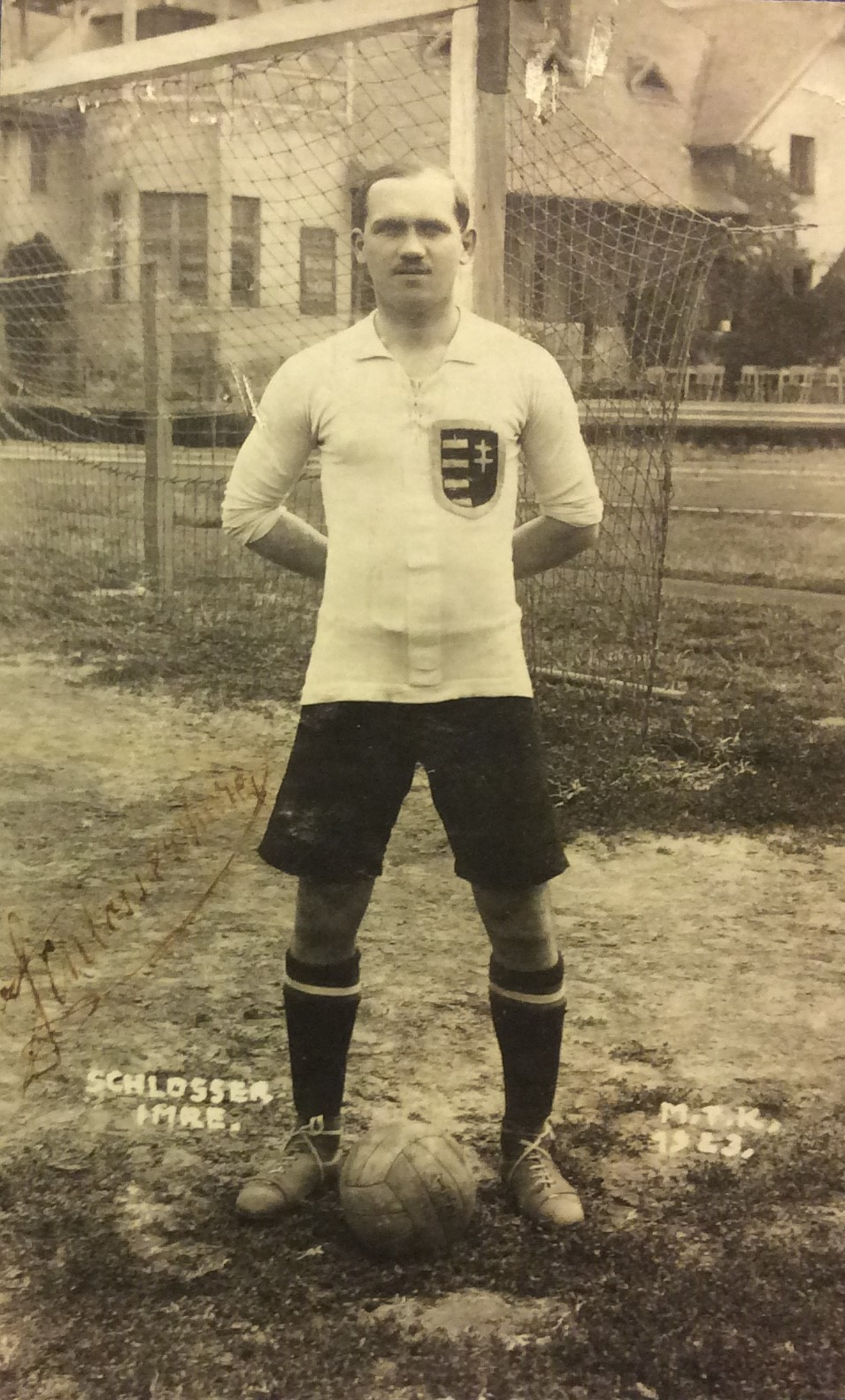
Schlosser in 1923

Imre Schlosser was a footballer who represented the Hungary national football team as a striker between 1906 and 1921, and again in 1926 and 1927. He scored his first international goal on 4 November 1906, aged 17 years and 24 days, in a 3–1 win over Austria. From there, he become both his country's and Europe's all-time top scorer in international football, scoring 59 goals in 68 times for Hungary (the team won 70% of the games in which they fielded Schlosser), resulting in a ratio of 0.87 goals per match. He held that position for 40 years, until being overtaken by Ferenc Puskás (84) and Sándor Kocsis (75) in the 50s, both members of the nation's Golden Team.

Schlosser was the first footballer to score 50 international goals, achieving the feat when he scored a brace (two goals) in a 6–2 victory against Austria on 3 June 1917. Schlosser scored 5 hat-tricks for Hungary, including a 5-goal haul in a 12–0 win over Russia and a 6-goal haul against Switzerland in a 9–0 win, but the most important came on 3 July 1912, when he netted his side's three goals in a 3–1 win over Germany in the 1912 Summer Olympics consolation tournament semi-finals, and Schlosser also scored in the final against Austria.

== International goals ==
Scores and results list Hungary's goal tally first and score column indicates the score after each Schlosser goal.

List of international goals scored by Imre Schlosser
No.	Cap	Date	Venue	Opponent	Score	Result	Competition	Ref
1	2	4 November 1906	Millenáris Sporttelep, Budapest, Hungary	Austria	2–0	3–1	Friendly	
2	7	5 April 1908	Millenáris Sporttelep, Budapest, Hungary	Bohemia	1–0	5–2	Friendly	
3	7	5 April 1908	Millenáris Sporttelep, Budapest, Hungary	Bohemia	2–1	5–2	Friendly	
4	10	1 November 1908 (*)	Millenáris Sporttelep, Budapest, Hungary	Austria	3–2	5–3	Friendly	
5	11	4 April 1909	Millenáris Sporttelep, Budapest, Hungary	Germany	2–1	3–3	Friendly	
6	12	2 May 1909	Cricketer Platz, Vienna, Austria	Austria	1–2	4–2	Friendly	
7	12	2 May 1909	Cricketer Platz, Vienna, Austria	Austria	3–2	4–2	Friendly	
8	12	2 May 1909	Cricketer Platz, Vienna, Austria	Austria	4–3	4–2	Friendly	
9	14	31 May 1909	Millenáris Sporttelep, Budapest, Hungary	England	1–5	2–8	Friendly	
10	15	7 November 1909	Millenáris Sporttelep, Budapest, Hungary	Austria	1–1	2–2	Friendly	
11	15	7 November 1909	Millenáris Sporttelep, Budapest, Hungary	Austria	2–1	2–2	Friendly	
12	17	26 May 1910	Millenáris Sporttelep, Budapest, Hungary	Italy	1–0	6–1	Friendly	
13	17	26 May 1910	Millenáris Sporttelep, Budapest, Hungary	Italy	3–0	6–1	Friendly	
14	19	1 January 1911	Stade Charentonneau, Maisons-Alfort, France	France	1–0	3–0	Friendly	
15	19	1 January 1911	Stade Charentonneau, Maisons-Alfort, France	France	2–0	3–0	Friendly	
16	19	1 January 1911	Stade Charentonneau, Maisons-Alfort, France	France	3–0	3–0	Friendly	
17	20	6 January 1911	Arena Civica, Milan, Italy	Italy	1–0	1–0	Friendly	
18	23	29 October 1911	Millenáris Sporttelep, Budapest, Hungary	Switzerland	3–0	9–0	Friendly	
19	23	29 October 1911	Millenáris Sporttelep, Budapest, Hungary	Switzerland	5–0	9–0	Friendly	
20	23	29 October 1911	Millenáris Sporttelep, Budapest, Hungary	Switzerland	6–0	9–0	Friendly	
21	23	29 October 1911	Millenáris Sporttelep, Budapest, Hungary	Switzerland	7–0	9–0	Friendly	
22	23	29 October 1911	Millenáris Sporttelep, Budapest, Hungary	Switzerland	8–0	9–0	Friendly	
23	23	29 October 1911	Millenáris Sporttelep, Budapest, Hungary	Switzerland	9–0	9–0	Friendly	
24	25	17 December 1911	Männer-Turn-Verein, Munich, Germany	Germany	2–0	4–1	Friendly	
25	25	17 December 1911	Männer-Turn-Verein, Munich, Germany	Germany	4–1	4–1	Friendly	
26	26	14 April 1912	Üllői úti stadion, Budapest, Hungary	Germany	1–0	4–4	Friendly	
27	29	23 June 1912	Kristiania, Oslo, Norway	Norway	1–0	6–0	Friendly	
28	29	23 June 1912	Kristiania, Oslo, Norway	Norway	6–0	6–0	Friendly	
29	31	3 July 1912	Råsunda IP, Stockholm, Sweden	Germany	1–0	3–1	1912 Summer Olympics – Consolation tournament	
30	31	3 July 1912	Råsunda IP, Stockholm, Sweden	Germany	2–0	3–1	1912 Summer Olympics – Consolation tournament	
31	31	3 July 1912	Råsunda IP, Stockholm, Sweden	Germany	3–1	3–1	1912 Summer Olympics – Consolation tournament	
32	32	5 July 1912	Råsunda IP, Stockholm, Sweden	Austria	1–0	3–0	1912 Summer Olympics – Consolation tournament	
33	33	12 July 1912	Sokolniki Pitch, Moscow, Russia	Russia	2–0	9–0	Friendly	
34	33	12 July 1912	Sokolniki Pitch, Moscow, Russia	Russia	7–0	9–0	Friendly	
35	34	14 July 1912	Sokolniki Pitch, Moscow, Russia	Russia	3–0	12–0	Friendly	
36	34	14 July 1912	Sokolniki Pitch, Moscow, Russia	Russia	4–0	12–0	Friendly	
37	34	14 July 1912	Sokolniki Pitch, Moscow, Russia	Russia	7–0	12–0	Friendly	
38	34	14 July 1912	Sokolniki Pitch, Moscow, Russia	Russia	8–0	12–0	Friendly	
39	34	14 July 1912	Sokolniki Pitch, Moscow, Russia	Russia	12–0	12–0	Friendly	
40	35	3 November 1912	Üllői úti stadion, Budapest, Hungary	Austria	1–0	4–0	Wagner Trophy	
41	35	3 November 1912	Üllői úti stadion, Budapest, Hungary	Austria	4–0	4–0	Wagner Trophy	
42	37	18 May 1913	Üllői úti stadion, Budapest, Hungary	Sweden	2–0	2–0	Friendly	
43	40	19 June 1914	Råsunda IP, Stockholm, Sweden	Sweden	5–1	5–1	Friendly	
44	41	21 June 1914	Råsunda IP, Stockholm, Sweden	Sweden	1–0	1–1	Friendly	
45	42	4 October 1914	Üllői úti stadion, Budapest, Hungary	Austria	2–2	2–2	Friendly	
46	45	30 May 1915	Prater Sportplatz, Vienna, Austria	Austria	1–0	2–1	Friendly	
47	46	3 October 1915	Prater Sportplatz, Vienna, Austria	Austria	1–0	2–4	Friendly	
48	48	4 June 1916	Üllői úti stadion, Budapest, Hungary	Austria	2–0	2–1	Friendly	
49	50	5 November 1916	Prater Sportplatz, Vienna, Austria	Austria	2–1	3–3	Friendly	
50	51	6 May 1917	Prater Sportplatz, Vienna, Austria	Austria	1–0	1–1	Friendly	
51	52	3 June 1917	Hungária körúti stadion, Budapest, Hungary	Austria	3–1	6–2	Friendly	
52	52	3 June 1917	Hungária körúti stadion, Budapest, Hungary	Austria	5–1	6–2	Friendly	
53	53	15 July 1917	Prater Sportplatz, Vienna, Austria	Austria	2–1	4–1	Friendly	
54	56	14 April 1918	Hungária körúti stadion, Budapest, Hungary	Austria	1–0	2–0	Friendly	
55	57	12 May 1918	Hungária körúti stadion, Budapest, Hungary	Switzerland	2–1	2–1	Friendly	
56	58	2 June 1918	Prater Sportplatz, Vienna, Austria	Austria	1–0	2–0	Friendly	
57	63	5 June 1921	Hungária körúti stadion, Budapest, Hungary	Germany	1–0	3–0	Friendly	
58	64	6 November 1921	Üllői úti stadion, Budapest, Hungary	Sweden	4–1	4–2	Friendly	

- Note, according to Austrian sources Schlosser scored both the goals for 3–2 and 4–2; one Hungarian source credits the 4–2 to Béla Krempels.

== Hat-tricks ==
No.	Date	Venue	Opponent	Goals	Result	Competition	Ref.
1	2 May 1909	Vienna Cricket and Football-Club, Vienna, Austria	Austria	3 – (35', 54'(pen.), 73'(pen.))	4–3	Friendly	
2	1 January 1911	Stade Charentonneau, Maisons-Alfort, Finland	France	3 – (10', 30', 49')	6–1	Friendly	
3	29 October 1911	Millenáris Sporttelep, Budapest Hungary	Switzerland	6 – (18', 56', 62', 79', 83', 85')	9–0	Friendly	
4	3 July 1912	Råsunda IP, Solna, Sweden	Germany	3 – (4', 40', 82')	3–1	1912 SO – Consolation tournament semi-finals	
5	14 July 1912	Sokolniki Pitch, Moscow, Russia	Russia	5 – (39', 50', 69', 71', 90')	12–0	Friendly	

== Statistics ==
Hungary national team
Year	Apps	Goals
1906	2	1
1907	4	0
1908	4	3
1909	5	7
1910	3	2
1911	7	12
1912	10	16
1913	3	1
1914	5	3
1915	4	2
1916	3	2
1917	5	4
1918	4	3
1919	1	0
1920	1	0
1921	4	2
1926	2	0
1927	1	0
Total	68	58

Goals by competition
Competition	Goals
Friendlies	53
1912 Summer Olympics	4
Wagner Trophy	2
Total	59

== See also ==
- List of men's footballers with 50 or more international goals
- List of footballers with 500 or more goals
