= Ferencváros (disambiguation) =

Ferencváros is a district in Budapest.

Ferencváros may also refer to:

- Ferencvárosi TC (sports club), a sports club located in Ferencváros, Budapest
- Ferencvárosi TC (football)
