= Adolf Kertész =

Hungarian footballer

Personal information
- Full name: Adolf Kertész
- Date of birth: 15 March 1892
- Place of birth: Barskisfalud, Austria-Hungary
- Date of death: November 1920 (aged 28)
- Place of death: Saarbrücken, Territory of the Saar Basin
- Position: Half back

Senior career*
Years	Team	Apps	(Gls)
1909–1920	MTK Budapest	148	(19)

International career
1911–1920	Hungary	11	(0)
- * Club domestic league appearances and goals

Adolf Kertész (15 March 1892 – November 1920; nicknamed "Kertész III") was a Hungarian footballer who played as a half back at both the professional level for MTK Budapest (winning the Hungarian League championship four times and the Hungarian Cup once) and the international level for the Hungary national football team. He was Jewish.

== Career ==
Kertész played left midfielder in club football for MTK between 1909 and 1920. He scored 19 goals in 148 league matches. He won the Hungarian League championship with MTK four times (1913–14, 1916–17, 1917–18, and 1919–20). He was a member of the side that won the 1909–10 Hungarian Cup.

Kertész also represented Hungary at international level, earning 11 caps between 1911 and 1920.

== Personal life ==
Kertész, who was Jewish, was born in Kisfalud, Austria-Hungary. He had two older brothers who were also footballers - Vilmos and Gyula.

Kertész died in a car accident in Saarbrücken, Germany, where he had settled, in November 1920, aged 28.

== See also ==
- List of Jewish footballers
