= János "Kisalagi" Wohlram =

Hungarian footballer

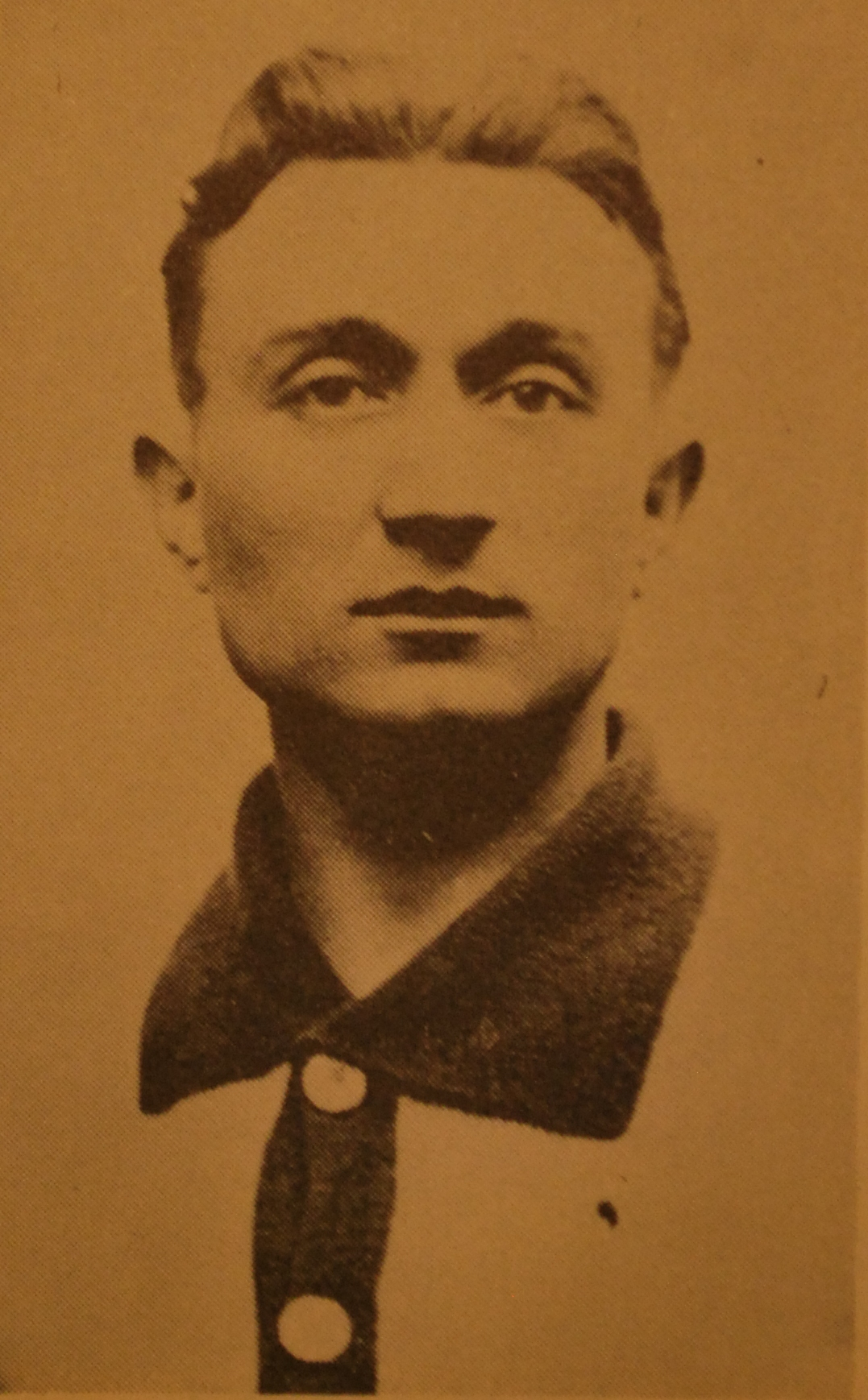
János "Kisalagi" Wohlram in the 1930s

János "Kisalagi" Wohlram (28 August 1912 – 6 July 1977) was a Hungarian professional footballer, a center-forward and coach.

A native of Budapest, he began his sporting career in athletics with Megyeri TC in 1925, before switching to football. He began his football career as a youth player for Megyeri TC in 1926. At the height of his career, he played for Nemzeti FC in the Hungarian National Championship I and II. In 1936, János Wohlram received the nickname "Kisalagi" after his living place. He played with the Hungarian national A-team once in 1938.

He was enlisted and mobilized to take additional military training several times. During World War II, he accomplished two missions. These military engagements negatively impacted his progress as a footballer. After World War II, he played in the Hungarian National Championship II and III until 1950, when he became a head coach. János "Kisalagi" Wohlram died in Budapest on 6 July 1977.

== Career ==
=== Club career ===
János "Kisalagi" Wohlram started as a goalkeeper, but played at the position of center-forward during most of his 24-year football career. As a youth player, he represented Megyeri TC between 1926 and 1933. He played as an amateur player parallel for Kisalagi SE and Vincze Ernő SE between 1933 and 1935. In the autumn of 1935, he moved to Nemzeti FC and started his professional career. He played for Nemzeti FC in the Hungarian National Championship I for three and a half seasons until the end of 1939. Kisalagi then transferred to Lampart FC in the Hungarian National Championship I and II where he played for two seasons between 1940 and 1942. He joined Dunakeszi Magyarság in 1942 that competed in the Hungarian National Championship II and III. He completed his career as a player for Fóti SE in 1950.

=== Career highlights ===
János "Kisalagi" Wohlram's career highlights included one appearance for the Hungarian national A-team, six appearances with the Hungarian national B-team, three appearances for U-teams, four appearances for the Factory Clubs' Championship team and one appearance for the Football Sub-Federation team. (Note: See) His only selection for the Hungarian national A-team was for the friendly match against Germany in Nürnberg on 20 March 1938 (1:1) when he played center-forward. His international experience with Nemzeti FC included international matches against three national teams and one city team. During these 19 appearances he scored a total of 11 (9) goals. (Note: Different numbers are due to conflicting counting of different sources.)

=== Honours, awards and statistics ===
János "Kisalagi" Wohlram's honours and awards included top scorer (50 goals) and two times champion of the Hungarian National Championship II with Nemzeti FC and Lampart FC; third place of the Hungarian National Championship II with Dunakeszi Magyarság; and fair trophy of the Factory Clubs’ Championship with Vincze Ernő SE. With Nemzeti FC, he appeared in 36 international matches and played against local clubs in Algeria, Austria, Czechoslovakia, Denmark, Germany, Gibraltar, Italy, Morocco, the Netherlands, Poland, Romania and Yugoslavia during which he scored a total of 44 (45) goals. After Béla Bihámy III (58 goals), he is the second best scorer, with 44 goals, in the history of the Nemzeti FC in the Hungarian National Championship I. He appeared altogether 77 times in the Hungarian National Championship I and scored 44 goals while playing for Nemzeti FC and Lampart FC, which made an average of 0.571 goals per match which ranked 57th all-time in the Hungarian National Championship I.

=== Coaching career ===
In 1942, he completed the football coach course in Budapest and began to serve as an assistant coach in 1943. He went on to become a head coach after retiring as a player in 1950. He managed local teams nearby of his living place in the IV-VI. Leagues. As a player and a coach, János "Kisalagi" Wohlram dedicated his life to football.

== Personal life ==
János Wohlram has had three sisters and two brothers who were amateur footballers. Besides playing football, he worked as a machine technician throughout his life. The Wohlram family moved to Kisalag, a small place close to the capital in 1932. János Wohlram was nicknamed "Kisalagi" after his living place. He married in 1939 and had three sons. He joined the revolution against the Soviet-backed government in 1956. After the revolt was overthrown, the State Security Police arrested him, but he was finally released after being sentenced for a couple of months. As a consequence of his involvement in the 1956 revolution, he was fired and remained jobless for years. Later, he was pardoned. He died in Budapest on 6 July 1977. The tomb of János Wohlram is located in Kisalag (Fót), his former living place.
