= VII. Kerületi SC =

Hungarian football club

- Full name: Zuglói VII. Kerületi Sport Club
- Founded: 1913
- Dissolved: 1923

VII. Kerületi Sport Club was a Hungarian association football club from the town of Budapest. The club was founded as Festőmunkások Labdarúgó Egylete in 1913. In 1923 the club merged to Zuglói AC.

== History ==
Zuglói VII. Kerületi Sport Club debuted in the 1920–21 season of the Hungarian League and finished sixth. In the 1921–22 season the club finished the 12th place and dropped to the II league.

== Name Changes ==
- 1913–1918: Festőmunkások Labdarúgó Egylete
- 1918–1923: VII. Kerületi Sport Club
- 1923: merger with Zuglói Atlétikai Club

== Honours ==
- Nemzeti Bajnokság II:
  - Winners (1): 1919–20

== Seasons ==
The table below shows the seasons of VII. Kerületi SC.

Season	Tier	Club's name	Position	Pts
1913–14	4	Festőmunkások LE	3 / 23	36
1914	1	Festőmunkások LE	0 / 9	
1915	2	Festőmunkások LE	3 / 12	15
1915	2	Festőmunkások LE	5 / 12	14
1916	2	Festőmunkások LE	1 / 8	10
1916–17	2	Festőmunkások LE	10 / 12	12
1917–18	2	Festőmunkások LE	9 / 12	14
1918–19	2	VII. Kerületi SC	9 / 12	16
1919–20	2	VII. Kerületi SC	1 / 17	49
1920–21	1	VII. Kerületi SC	6 / 15	22
1921–22	1	VII. Kerületi SC	12 / 12	13
1922–23	2	VII. kerületi SC	14 / 15	18

== Managers ==
The is a list of managers.

- Imre Schlosser (1921-1922)
- Károly Terezsák (1922)
- Ferenc Weisz (1922)
