= Vilmos Kertész =

Hungarian footballer (1890–1962)

Personal information
- Full name: Vilmos Kertész II
- Date of birth: 21 March 1890
- Place of birth: Vieska nad Žitavou, Austria-Hungary
- Date of death: 15 September 1962 (aged 72)
- Place of death: Melbourne, Australia
- Position: Winger

Senior career*
Years	Team	Apps	(Gls)
1908–1924	MTK	239	(39)
1925–1926	Nemzeti SC	21	(0)

International career
1909–1924	Hungary	47	(11)

Managerial career
- 1926–1930: Vasas
- 1931–1932: Ripensia Timişoara
- * Club domestic league appearances and goals

Vilmos Kertész II (21 March 1890 – 15 September 1962) was a Hungarian international Olympian footballer. He played alongside his two brothers, Gyula and Adolf.

== Early life ==
Kertész was born in Vieska nad Žitavou, Austria-Hungary, and was Jewish.

== Career ==
Kertész played club football at the inside right and midfield positions for MTK Budapest from 1908 to 1924. He played alongside his two brothers, Gyula and Adolf. He was a midfielder for NSC Budapest from 1924 to 1926.

He played international football for the Hungary national football team, where he earned a total of 47 caps, scoring 11 goals. Kertész also participated at the 1912 Summer Olympics and the 1924 Summer Olympics.

Kertész coached Ékszerész SC, Budapesti Vasas SC (1926–30), and Ripensia Timişoara (1931-32).

== See also ==
- List of Jewish footballers
