= Foundation for Africa =

Hungarian public benefit organization

- Company type: Charity
- Industry: Environmentalism
- Founded: 2002, Hungary & 2004, Democratic Republic of the Congo
- Headquarters: Budapest, Hungary
- Key people: France Mutombo Tshimuanga; Bálint Hamvas; Nsosso Espérance
- Website: http://afrikaert.hu/en/

Foundation for Africa is a Hungarian public benefit organization for development and aid created by a civil initiative. It was first registered in Hungary in 2002 and later in the Democratic Republic of the Congo in 2004. The main aims of the Foundation for Africa is to help development, aid and the forming of civil society through providing help in the fields of education, society and health care in Africa and organizing cultural programs and lectures to introduce the continent to Hungary.

== History ==
The Foundation for Africa was established by France Mutombo Tshimuanga. One of the main aims was to facilitate education in the Democratic Republic of the Congo.

== Mission ==
Most countries in Africa are torn by an irrational level of poverty, numerous diseases and incessant violence, which has moved us to act and provide assistance in an organized way. The primary objective and guiding principle is to provide the African people with theoretical and practical knowledge in the fields of education, health and social services, something they can apply in their everyday life and activities and employ alone in the future without external help. The temporary and ad hoc relief activities can increase a country's dependence on external assistance and strengthen the people's belief that they are unable to find their own footing. Therefore, the projects of the Foundation for Africa aim at a deep and sustainable process of change where the recipients are active participants, not only passive actors or "objects". This approach is based on the principle of mutuality and ownership.

== Programs ==
=== Adoption program ===
The orphan and student support program is successfully running. Within the framework of these programs the supporters with a regular monthly financial support provide the children's daily lives and studies. The foundation has two schools and two orphanage's houses in Congo and Tanzania.

==== Student support program ====
Currently the foundation has 800 students enrolled. Most of them has already arranged a Hungarian supporter. Also secured the regular salary of the school's 45 teachers. The support system is based on a personal contact. A supporter with 2900 HUF/month (around $10) can provide one student's schooling fees. In Congo the Othniel Primary and Secondary School is continuously growing, this is the first and largest institute of the organisation. The foundation has been operating another school In Tanzania too since 2013. There are 60 students and 3 teachers participate in the student adoption program. In 2014, the construction of a new building at the site of College Othinel was completed. At the opening ceremony, Francis Mutombo Tshimuanga was present.

==== Orphan adoption program ====
In Congo 4 million orphaned children live, about 200 000 of them on the street. La Providence orphanage house in Congo is intended to provide a stable basis for their future. The foundation takes care of the children's social, catering, and accommodation supply. Currently 11 small children live in the La Providence Orphanage. Like the student support system - in regular monthly basis - to improve the living conditions of orphans the supporters can contribute with a symbolic adoption. Within this framework, the contributors symbolically adopt an orphan. The adoptives can contact, regularly to correspond with them and they are informed about the results of study. The future plan is to expand the La Providence orphanage, increasing the number of staff. In 2013, Hungarian volunteers helped constructing the fences around La Providence, an orphanage in the Democratic Republic of the Congo.

=== Missionary roads ===
The staff of the Foundation regularly visit the Congo to observe the institutions, as well as to look for new development opportunities. The bestowal is the inseparable part of the trips. The association every time provide pharmaceutical and food donations for hospitals. The foundation has connection with the SDA Clinic Foundation, the Hospital Kimpese, the Hospital Kibandai, Hospital Bangu, the Clinique Mondial, and other institutes, in Kinshasa and in the countryside, rural villages and smaller towns too of course measure the local needs.

=== Humanitarian tourism ===
Since 2007, the foundation organizes tourist trips for those who are interested in helping, humanitarian assistance and tourist's attractions too. The humanitarian tourism is a new type of holiday, which combines elements of exotic holidays and humanitarian assistance. The main goal of these travels not just the resting but also to introduce the black continent's beauties and the daily life of Africa. Participants meet, with local people, participate in the daily life and realize a simple development project, which serves a humanitarian purpose. (For example: paint the orphanage house, other renovations, participation in simple construction works and buy and give donations. The travelers visit the foundation's institutes and communities.

=== Rural presence ===
The African health care system gets to grips with a huge need. The high rate of mortality caused not only wars, but in many cases rather a lack of medical care, which increases the spread of diseases. The foundation places particular emphasis to ensure modern equipment and medicines especially for the own institutes. The foundation deals also with the rural area, in Matonge, Kimpoko, and Ngamanzo. In smaller towns the foundation organizes meetings, health days, surgery hours, and other condition surveys with any topic, e.g.: agricultural education. The foundation considers it important to manage the water supply problems.

=== Relief supplies ===
The food, cloth, medicine and present division is the permanent program of the foundation. With key partners the foundation is able to place particular emphasis to special problems. In 2005, Richter Gedeon PLC. provided 2.5 tonnes of contraceptive (Postiner). The foundation with UNDP could to forward to the hundreds thousands of women who have been sexually abused and who wants to prevent the unwanted pregnancy. In recent years, many tasks have been carried out by the Foundation staff. These include: ad hoc humanitarian projects, opening advocacy offices, AIDS prevention.

In 2008-2009, the foundation sent to eastern Congo 1,000 tons of food, clothing, medical supplies, and started a catering program in Muganga's refugee camps where 1200 children live. The foundation donated medicines, drugs, emergency equipment for more than five health centers and hospitals, which are located in rural areas and in the capital.

== Activities in Hungary ==
From 12 to 14 September 2014, the 4th African Days program was held in the Millenáris Sporttelep in Budapest, attracting more than 1000 visitors.

On 17 and 18 June 2015, the Hungarian-African Innovation and Business conference was held at MOM Park in Budapest.

In 2015, Vízibility, a one-day event, was held to raise awareness of the water problems of the African continent. At the event, Sena Dagadu, the Hungarian pop band Irie Maffia's lead singer, gave a concert.
