= Lőrinc Barabás =

Hungarian trumpeter and composer (born 1983)

- Born: Lőrinc Ellison Barabás; March 10, 1983 (age 42); Budapest, Hungary
- Genres: Jazz, electronic, neoclassical music
- Occupation(s): Trumpeter, composer
- Instrument(s): Trumpet, keyboards, piano
- Years active: 2005–present
- Website: barabaslorinc.com

Lőrinc Barabás (born March 10, 1983) is a Hungarian trumpeter and composer who works in jazz, electronic, and neoclassical music. His father is the painter Márton Barabás.

== Education ==
At age 12, Barabás began playing the trumpet. He studied jazz trumpet at the Kőbányai Music Studio from 1999 to 2001, and later attended the Franz Liszt Academy of Music, where he earned a diploma as a jazz trumpet teacher and performer in 2006. In 2011, he completed the SAE Institute Electronic Music Production Course in New York City.

== Career ==
During his university years, Barabás played with several bands, including Soulwhat in Hong Kong and the Uptown Felaz band at the Noosa Jazz Festival in Australia. With Uptown Felaz, he co-produced the soundtrack for the film Kész Cirkusz, which won the Best Original Soundtrack award at the Hungarian Film Festival in 2005. He was also a member of Irie Maffia from 2005 to 2009.

Between 2005 and 2010, Barabás organized a weekly improvisational music series in Budapest called Random Szerda, which led to the release of a compilation album, Small Talk, in 2008. In 2005, he formed his own band, Barabás Lőrinc Eklektric, which blended jazz-funk and pop. The band released two albums, Ladal (2007) and Trick (2009), before disbanding in 2010.

After moving to London from 2009 to 2010, Barabás shifted his focus to electronic music. He began using loop stations to layer his trumpet sound, a technique featured on his 2013 solo album Sastra. Material from this album was used in the documentary Élet a Dunán. His 2015 album, Elevator Dance Music, explored the combination of instrumental and electronic music.

The Barabás Lőrinc Quartet was formed in 2015, featuring Zoltán Cséry on keyboards, Attila Herr on bass, and Zsolt Nagy on drums. The group's music combines jazz with electronic elements.

Barabás has collaborated with artists including Erik Truffaz, Nicola Conte, Takuya Kuroda, Niklas Paschburg, and Valerie June.

== Discography ==
=== With bands ===
- Ladal (2007) (with Eklektric)
- Small Talk (2008) (with Random Szerda)
- Trick (2009) (with Eklektric)
- Beardance (2016) (with Quartet)
- Maps (2018) (with Random Szerda)
- Other Than Unusual (2018) (with Quartet)
- Keys (2018) (with Random Szerda)
- Open (2021) (with Quartet)

=== Solo albums ===
- Sastra (2013)
- Elevator Dance Music (2015)
- Algorhythms (2019)
- 22 (2023)

== Awards ==
- 2005: Best Original Soundtrack award at the Hungarian Film Festival for the film Kész Cirkusz
- 2010: Márciusi Ifjak Prize for outstanding artistic performance

== Sources ==
- Barabás Lőrinc Quartet (in Hungarian)
- Port.hu (in Hungarian)
- Búcsúzik a Barabás Lőrinc Eklektric (in Hungarian)
- Sastra - Album review (in Hungarian)
