= 1921–22 Nemzeti Bajnokság I =

Nemzeti Bajnokság I
- Season: 1921–22
- Country: Hungary
- Champions: MTK Budapest FC

Statistics of Nemzeti Bajnokság I for the 1921–22 season.

== Overview ==
It was contested by 12 teams, and MTK Hungária FC won the championship.

== League standings ==
Pos	Team	Pld	W	D	L	GF	GA	GR	Pts
1	MTK Budapest FC	22	16	5	1	60	11	5.455	37
2	Ferencvárosi TC	22	16	4	2	41	13	3.154	36
3	Újpest FC	22	13	6	3	52	19	2.737	32
4	Törekvés SE	22	8	6	8	27	33	0.818	22
5	III. Kerületi TUE	22	8	5	9	27	37	0.730	21
6	Vívó és Atlétikai Club	22	5	10	7	18	23	0.783	20
7	Vasas SC	22	7	6	9	24	33	0.727	20
8	Budapesti TC	22	8	3	11	18	23	0.783	19
9	Magyar AC	22	5	7	10	14	17	0.824	17
10	Kispest AC	22	2	10	10	15	36	0.417	14
11	Terézvárosi TC	22	3	7	12	19	37	0.514	13
12	VII. Kerületi SC	22	2	9	11	9	42	0.214	13

Source: rsssf.com

== Results ==
Home \ Away	III	VII	BTC	FTC	KIS	MAC	MTK	TER	TÖR	ÚJP	VAS	VIV
III. Kerület		1–0	0–2	1–4	2–0	1–0	1–2	4–1	1–1	1–6	2–2	2–0
VII. Kerület	0–3		0–1	0–2	0–0	0–0	0–11	0–0	1–5	0–3	0–2	1–1
Budapesti TC	0–1	0–0		1–2	0–1	0–2	0–2	1–0	2–1	0–1	0–4	2–0
Ferencváros	1–1	1–0	2–0		0–0	2–0	-:+ (Note: The match between Ferencváros and MTK Budapest was settled as a goalless win for MTK.)	4–1	3–0	3–2	3–1	1–0
Kispesti AC	0–0	1–1	0–1	2–4		1–1	0–2	2–0	1–3	0–8	1–4	0–1
Magyar AC	0–1	0–1	0–0	0–1	0–0		1–2	3–0	1–2	0–2	0–1	1–0
MTK Budapest	6–1	5–0	4–2	2–0	1–1	1–0		1–1	5–0	4–2	5–0	0–1
Terézváros	1–1	1–2	0–1	0–1	1–1	1–1	0–2		3–2	1–1	2–3	1–1
Törekvés	3–0	3–1	2–1	0–0	2–2	0–1	0–0	0–2		0–3	1–0	1–0
Újpest	3–1	1–1	1–0	2–2	2–0	0–0	0–0	3–0	5–0		1–0	2–2
Vasas	1–0	1–1	0–0	0–4	1–0	0–2	1–5	1–3	0–0	2–3		0–0
Vivó AC	4–2	0–0	0–4	0–1	2–2	1–1	0–0	2–0	1–1	2–1	0–0	

Source: rsssf.com
Legend: Blue = home team win; Yellow = draw; Red = away team win.
