= Irie Maffia =

Hungarian pop band

- Origin: Hungary
- Genres: Reggae, Dancehall, Hip-hop, Funk, Rock
- Years active: 2005 – present
- Label: unsigned
- Members: Ákos Baranyai; István Busa; Sena Dagadu; Tamás Dési; Márton Élő; Péter Matus; Gáspár Horváth; András Kéri; Ádám Meggyes; Antal Oláh; Ádám Szekér; Kemon W. Thomas
- Past members: Lőrinc Barabás; Miklós Havas; Zoltán Demeter
- Website: http://www.iriemaffia.hu

Irie Maffia is a Hungarian pop band formed in 2005. Their music is based on reggae and dancehall, which they blend with hip hop, funk and rock. The band also has a sound system formation (Irie Maffia Soundsystem), where András Kéri (a.k.a. MC Columbo) sings ragga lyrics on the reggae/dancehall riddims played by band leader Márton Élő (a.k.a. Dermot) and Gáspár Horváth (a.k.a. Jumo Daddy) from vinyl records.

== History and present ==
Their first recording in 2006 made use of a dancehall riddim, the Rodeo riddim (formerly made popular by the mighty Seeed), which was released by Germaica Records, Europe's leading reggae/dancehall record company.

The full house release party of the Mafia's first LP, Fel a kezekkel! (Hands In The Air), took place on A38, a party boat in Budapest, in December, 2007.

To make the most of the success, the Maffia went on tour to several European destinations, amongst which was the Italian Rototom Sunsplash in 2007, probably the greatest reggae competition of the continent. They came in second.

Irie Maffia's first video clip, shot for their most popular song, "Hands In The Air", came out by the spring of 2008.

In autumn 2008 the Irie Maffia is one of the 5 nominees for MTV European Music Awards Local Hero, the voting is now on.

Until February 2013, the band's sound system formation held weekly club nights in Corvintető, offering reggae music to the Tuesday night audience of the venue.

Having fulfilled the requirements of Dutch/foreign trustees, the Maffia took part in Amsterdam's My City Budapest Festival, an event featuring the most important Hungarian bands. They were also asked to participate in a festival in Rovereto, Italy, celebrating the 90th anniversary of the end of World War I, to which each European country's national radio station contributed one band.

In 2015, Vízibility, a one-day event organised by Foundation for Africa, was held to raise awareness to the water problems of the African continent. At the event, Sena Dagadu gave a concert.

== Members ==
- Sena Dagadu a.k.a. MC Sena - vocals, rap, spoken word
- András Kéri a.k.a. MC Columbo - vocals, rap
- Kemon W. Thomas a.k.a. MC Kemon - vocals, rap
- István Busa a.k.a. Papa Diamont - rap
- Ákos Baranyai a.k.a. DJ Future - turntable
- Tamás Dési a.k.a. Monsieur Büdoá - drums
- Ádám Meggyes a.k.a. Mézeságyas - trumpet
- Márton Élő a.k.a. Dermot - trombone
- Gáspár Horváth a.k.a. Jumo Daddy - keyboards
- Péter Matus a.k.a. Kölyök - bass
- Ádám Szekér - guitar
- Antal Oláh a.k.a. Monsieur Zsömoá - percussion

== Discography ==
- Fel a Kezekkel! / Hands In The Air! - 2008
- What's my name? - 2009
- Nagyon jó lesz - 2013
- 10 - 2015

== Videos ==
- Hands In The Air - 2008
- Slow Down Chale - 2009

== Appearances ==
- Rototom Sunsplash (Udine, Italy) - 2007, 2008
- My City Budapest (Amsterdam, the Netherlands) - 2008
- Sziget Festival Budapest
- Sentiero Di Pace (Path Of Peace) Festival (Rovereto, Italy) - 2008
- Red Bull Music Clash: Irie Maffia vs. Magna Cum Laude (Miskolc, Hungary) - 2008

== See also ==
- Hungarian pop
