= Kisfalud =

- District
- Location of Kisfalud
- Coordinates: 47.20408°N 18.49458°E
- Country: Hungary
- County: Fejér
- City: Székesfehérvár

Area
  - Total: 15.11 km^{2} (5.83 sq mi)

Population
  - Total: 800
  - Density: 54.66/km^{2} (141.6/sq mi)
- Time zone: UTC+1 (CET)
  - Summer (DST): UTC+2 (CEST)
- Postal code: 9341
- Area code: 96

Kisfalud is a district on the east side of Székesfehérvár in Fejér county, Hungary. It has a population of 800 (2022 census). It is connected to the city centre by bus line 22, and had a railway station on the now extinct Székesfehérvár–Bicske train line. Road 8116 and the Budapest–Balaton bikeway pass through the district, and it lies close to main road 7 and the M7 motorway.

== Notable residents ==
- Adolf Kertész (1892–1920), footballer
