= 2022 Magyar Kupa (men's water polo) =

Men's water polo tournament

2022 BENU Magyar Kupa
Tournament details
- Country: Hungary
- Venue(s): Császár-Komjádi Swimming Stadium; Budapest
- Dates: 9–10 December 2022
- Teams: 16
- Defending champions: FTC-Telekom

Final positions
- Champions: FTC-Telekom (22nd title)
- Runner-up: Genesys OSC-Újbuda
- Semifinalists: Endo Plus Service-Honvéd; A-Híd VasasPlaket

Tournament statistics
- Scoring leader(s): Stylianos Argyropoulos (18 goals)
- Sponsored name, referring to BENU.

The 2022 Magyar Kupa (English: Hungarian Cup) is the 96th season of Hungary's annual knock-out cup water polo competition. The title holders were FTC-Telekom by winning the 2021 Magyar Kupa Final.

== Quarterfinals ==
The quarter-final matches were played between 23 and 26 November 2022.

Team 1	Agg.	Team 2	1st leg	2nd leg
A-Híd VasasPlaket	26–15	Szeged	13–6	13–9
Genesys OSC-Újbuda	26–18	Szolnoki Dózsa	15–10	11–8
Endo Plus Service-Honvéd	25–17	Tigra-ZF-Eger	16–7	9–10
BVSC-Zugló	18–27	FTC-Telekom	6–11	12–16

== Final four ==
The final four was held on 9–10 December 2022 at the Császár-Komjádi Swimming Stadium in Budapest.

Semifinals
9 December, 18:00
Genesys OSC-Újbuda	12
Endo Plus Service-Honvéd	10
9 December, 20:00
A-Híd VasasPlaket	9
FTC-Telekom	13

Final
10 December, 18:45
Genesys OSC-Újbuda	15
FTC-Telekom	16

=== Semifinals ===
9 December 2022; 18:00	Report	Genesys OSC-Újbuda	12–10	Endo Plus Service-Honvéd	Császár-Komjádi Swimming Stadium, Budapest; Referees: Petik, Fodor
9 December 2022; 18:00	Report	Score by quarters: 3–4, 1–3, 4–0, 4–3			Császár-Komjádi Swimming Stadium, Budapest; Referees: Petik, Fodor
9 December 2022; 18:00	Report	Manhercz 3	Goals	Hosnyánszky 3	Császár-Komjádi Swimming Stadium, Budapest; Referees: Petik, Fodor

9 December 2022; 20:00	Report	A-Híd VasasPlaket	9–13	FTC-Telekom	Császár-Komjádi Swimming Stadium, Budapest; Referees: Tóth, Rubos
9 December 2022; 20:00	Report	Score by quarters: 2–4, 2–5, 3–2, 2–2			Császár-Komjádi Swimming Stadium, Budapest; Referees: Tóth, Rubos
9 December 2022; 20:00	Report	Bátori 3	Goals	Argyropoulos, Varga 3	Császár-Komjádi Swimming Stadium, Budapest; Referees: Tóth, Rubos

=== Final ===
10 December 2022; 18:30	Report	Genesys OSC-Újbuda	15–16	FTC-Telekom	Császár-Komjádi Swimming Stadium, Budapest; Referees: Kovács Cs., Csanádi
10 December 2022; 18:30	Report	Score by quarters: 3–3, 4–5, 5–2, 3–6			Császár-Komjádi Swimming Stadium, Budapest; Referees: Kovács Cs., Csanádi
10 December 2022; 18:30	Report	Manhercz 3	Goals	Argyropoulos 6	Császár-Komjádi Swimming Stadium, Budapest; Referees: Kovács Cs., Csanádi

==== Final standings ====
	Team
	FTC-Telekom
Silver medal	Genesys OSC-Újbuda
Bronze medal	Endo Plus Service-Honvéd
Bronze medal	A-Híd VasasPlaket

2022 Magyar Kupa champions
FTC-Telekom
22nd title

== See also ==
- 2022–23 Országos Bajnokság I
