= Nemzeti SC =

Hungarian football club

- Full name: Nemzeti Sport Club
- Founded: 1906
- Dissolved: 1957
- Ground: Millenáris Sporttelep
- Capacity: 8,130
Home colours	Away colours

Nemzeti Sport Club or simply Nemzeti SC was a Hungarian football club from the town of, Terézváros, Budapest.

== History ==
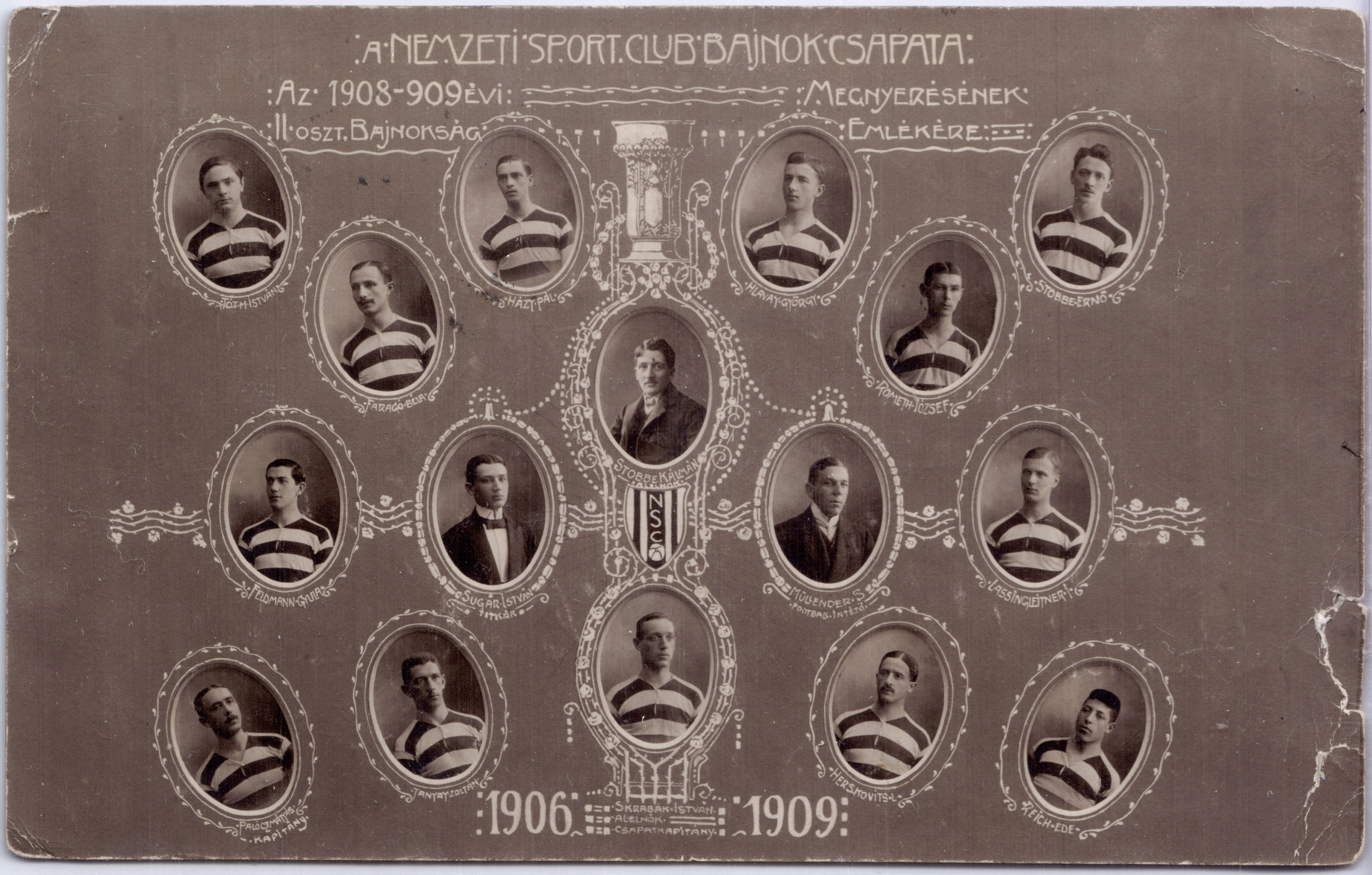
The winning team of 1908–09 Nemzeti Bajnokság II

The Nemzeti Sport Club was founded on June 3, 1906 by outstanding athletes from the Budapesti TC. The team competed in the Nemzeti Bajnokság II, and by the end of the following season, it had won the championship and been promoted to the top division. "The newly formed National Sports Club was spending only its second year in the second division, but with its mature play and consistent performance, it secured the championship title," wrote János Földessy about the team in his book *Hungarian Football and the Hungarian Footballers' Association. 1897, 1901, 1925*.

The first match of the Nemzeti Sport Club soccer team was against Budapesti Postás and it ended with a 1–1. The National SC held its first public match on St. Peter and Paul's Day, which took place in Rákossztentmihály due to the ban on games in the capital. The debut went quite well. The lineups were as follows: Postatakarék: Salamon–Weinber, Buőcz – Biró, Fischer, Kukorelli – Braun, Korodi, Faragó, Kovács G., Czakó. National SC: Tanyay – Stobbe I., Müllender – Lassingleitner, Skrabák, Palócz – Stobbe II, Herschaft, Drégely, Sztrakos, Tóth I. In the 12th minute of the game, NSC took the lead through Sztrakos, but Postatakarék quickly equalized through Faragó. At the start of the second half, Postatakarék did most of the attacking, while Nemzeti dominated the final 10 minutes of the match. Postatakarék's attacks were led by Faragó, and it is to goalkeeper Tanyay's credit that no further goals were scored. The fair and lively play was disrupted only by Weinber's rough play, for which the referee sent him off. Referee: Nagy F. (MTK)

Nemzeti SC debuted in the 1909–10 season of the Hungarian League and finished third.

This sudden success came at a price: the team's star players were poached by bigger clubs, but NSC managed to retain its top-flight status until the end of the 1913–1914 season. After the war, the club started in the Nemzeti Bajnokság I but was immediately relegated, and did not return until 1924. In the final match of the last "amateur championship," Nemzeti defeated 33 FC 5–1, though our newspaper's reporter was not impressed by the game. "A poor performance not seen in a long time, a lopsided victory not deserved," the report stated. Tibor Gallowich defended the NSC goal in that match; he later worked as a journalist, published in Képes Sport, and served as editor-in-chief of Népsport; between 1945 and 1948, he also held the position of head coach of the Hungarian national team. He laid the foundation for the Golden Team; among others, Ferenc Puskás made his debut under him. However, he did not live to see the Olympic championship title won in Helsinki or the 6-3 victory in London; he died in Gyula on July 13, 1952.

NSC played its first professional match in club history against the eventual champions, Ferencváros; on September 5, 1926, the two teams played to a 3–3 draw in a thrilling match at Üllői út. "The unexpectedly dangerous forward line nearly won the match for the National Team," Nemzeti Sport noted, while head coach Lajos Faragó said the National Team played better soccer and deserved the victory. The team finished the season in eighth place, winning only one of its nine home matches. The team still did not have its own stadium; this season, it hosted its opponents at Hungária út and Üllői út. They fared better on the road, winning in Újpest and Szombathely.

Nemzeti SC, sometimes referred to in Nemzeti Sport as the "Black Devils," typically performed as a mid-table team in the years that followed, finishing fifth in 1931. That summer, Terézvárosi TC merged with the team, even though nine years earlier, following a rowdy match, representatives of the two teams had come to blows, and a revolver had even been drawn—incidentally, merger talks were already underway between the parties at that time.

The "Nemzetiek" saw their performance decline in the following years; after two tenth-place finishes, the team was relegated from the top division at the end of the 1933–34 Nemzeti Bajnokság I season. Although they scored a brilliant victory against Hungária in the fall and defeated the III. Kerület 3–0 in front of 600 spectators at Millenáris, the black-and-white squad failed to win a single match in the spring. No wonder that after suffering a 3-0 defeat in Miskolc in the final round, Nemzeti Sport wrote, "the leaders of Nemzeti are shying away from making statements."

The return to the top flight only came on the second attempt; in 1935, Budafoki FC finished ahead of NSC. However, when Nemzeti was once again able to compete among the best, it finished fifth as a newcomer, followed by a seventh- and a sixth-place finish. In the fall of 1939, teams from the newly annexed territories of the country, which had since expanded its borders, joined the league. Although the team lost to Szombathelyi Haladás in the opening round, it went on to defeat Kassa and Szürketaxi FC.

It later turned out that this was NSC's last top-flight victory. After six consecutive losses, the club's management decided to withdraw. "The club considered many of the measures taken against them to be unfair, believing they had been unjustly targeted. Contributing to the frustration and discouragement was that signing new players had greatly increased the club's expenses—and the expected success had not materialized," wrote Nemzeti Sport on November 26, 1939. The club's general meeting unanimously declared that Nemzeti SC would be dissolved.

However, the club's history did not end there; after the war, in May 1945, it entered the twelve-team Budapest league. "The NSC—just like MTK—had recently begun to rebuild its team, which had been torn apart by senseless fascist measures. Given the expertise and agility of the black-and-whites' leadership, we have no doubt that the reorganization was a success," Népsport wrote before the start. However, the black-and-white team failed to deliver good results on the field, finishing last.

NSC could have still improved its standing in a playoff match, but after a 3-0 win in the first leg, it lost 7-0 to Újpesti TSE. The club's management wanted to compete in the BLASz Championship, which serves as the second division, but the players were unwilling to do so. "Under these circumstances, despite our best efforts, we are unable to participate in the championship; we promise that as soon as the opportunity arises again, we will serve Hungarian soccer with our former enthusiasm," the statement read.

On February 12, 1957, Nemzeti Sport reported that the NSC had been reestablished at the club's former headquarters, the Park Hotel on Baross Square. "Who could forget—just the soccer players—the names of Gallowich, Gallina, Vágó, Volentik, Bartos, the Rémay brothers, Bihámi, Fenyvesi, and Spitz, or even the legendary defensive trio of the 1930s, Túri, Balogh, and Szalay? All of them were NSC players. – On Sunday, the National Sports Club was launched on a new path, and the mood of the meeting indicated that the NSC would once again be a strong bastion of our sporting life. – We, too, wish them success in their endeavors," wrote Sport.

However, the football club's golden age never returned.

== Honours ==
- Nemzeti Bajnokság II:
  - Winners (2): 1908–09, 1935–36

== Name changes ==
- 1906–1926: Nemzeti Sport Club
- 1926–1931: Nemzeti Sportkedvelők Clubja
- 1931–1940: VII. ker. Nemzeti Sportkedvelők Köre
- 1931: merger with Terézvárosi TC
- 1940–1942: Nemzeti Sport Club
- 1942–1945: did not operate
- 1945–1945: Nemzeti Sport Club
- 1945–1957: did not operate
- 1957: re-established
- 1957–present: Nemzeti Sport Club

== Seasons ==
The table below shows the seasons of Nemzeti SC.

Season	Tier	Club's name	Position	Pts
1907–08	2	Nemzeti SC	2 / 8	23
1908–09	2	Nemzeti SC	1 / 9	30
1909–10	1	Nemzeti SC	3 / 9	18
1910–11	1	Nemzeti SC	8 / 10	12
1911–12	1	Nemzeti SC	7 / 10	16
1912–13	1	Nemzeti SC	9 / 10	6
1913–14	1	Nemzeti SC	10 / 10	9
1914	1	Nemzeti SC	4 / 9	
1914	2	Nemzeti SC	5 / 8	5
1915	2	Nemzeti SC	1 / 5	12
1915	2	Nemzeti SC	10 / 12	5
1916	2	Nemzeti SC	2 / 3	2
1916–17	2	Nemzeti SC	2 / 12	32
1917–18	2	Nemzeti SC	3 / 12	27
1918–19	2	Nemzeti SC	2 / 12	33
1919–20	1	Nemzeti SC	12 / 15	20
1920–21	2	Nemzeti SC	2 / 14	38
1921–22	2	Nemzeti SC	4 / 15	33
1922–23	2	Nemzeti SC	5 / 15	30
1923–24	2	Nemzeti SC	2 / 14	40
1924–25	1	Nemzeti SC	6 / 12	22
1925–26	1	Nemzeti SC	5 / 12	24
1926–27	1	Nemzeti SC	8 / 10	14
1927–28	1	Nemzeti SC	6 / 12	18
1928–29	1	Nemzeti SC	7 / 12	19
1929–30	1	Nemzeti SC	10 / 12	16
1930–31	1	Nemzeti SC	5 / 12	24
1931–32	1	VII. ker. Nemzeti SK	10 / 12	14
1932–33	1	Nemzeti SC	10 / 12	13
1933–34	1	Nemzeti SC	12 / 12	12
1934–35	2	Nemzeti FC	2 / 13	38
1935–36	2	Nemzeti SC	1 / 14	49
1936–37	1	Nemzeti SC	5 / 14	32
1937–38	1	Nemzeti SC	7 / 14	24
1938–39	1	Nemzeti SC	6 / 14	28
1939–40	1	Nemzeti SC	14 / 14	4
1940–41	3	Nemzeti SC	5 / 12	25
1941–42	3	Nemzeti SC	12 / 12	-
1945	1	Nemzeti SC	12 / 12	3
1945–46	2	Nemzeti SC	14 / 14	-
