= Budapesti AK =

Hungarian football club

- Full name: Budapesti Atlétikai Klub
- Nickname: BAK
- Short name: BAK
- Founded: 1900 & 2018
- Ground: Angyalföldi Sportközpont
- Capacity: 1,500
- Chairman: Bertalan Molnar
- Manager: Péter Bernau
- League: BLSZ III
- Website: http://budapesti-atletikai-klub.hu/
Home colours	Away colours

Budapesti Atlétikai Klub, also known as BAK, is a Hungarian football club from the town of Budapest that competes in the BLSZ III.

== History ==
Budapesti Atlétikai Klub was founded in 1900 by a group of athletes who had decided to leave their previous sports club MTK Budapest because, at that time, there was no football section at MTK. It debuted in the 1906–07 season of the Hungarian League and finished fourth. The club remained in the top flight for 15 years, before being relegated in 1921. BAK eventually folded in 1947.

=== Reforming of the club ===
The club was reformed for the first time in more than 70 years ahead of the 2018/19 season by a group of local enthusiasts inspired by the story of one of BAK's most famous former players, Ernő Egri Erbstein, who played for the original club from 1916 to 1924. Led by club president Bertalan Molnar, BAK merged with an existing team called Respect and took that club's place in BLSZ III, the sixth tier of Hungarian football. The club is commonly referred to by the acronym BAK, and as the word 'bak' means 'ram' in Hungarian, a ram's head appears on the club's new logo.

=== Friendships ===
In November 2018, the newly re-established BAK announced the rekindling of a friendship with the English amateur club Corinthian-Casuals FC, based on shared values and a history that goes back to the days when the original Corinthian Football Club visited Budapest to play a series of games in 1904. They established a trophy called the Corinthian Cup, in which the original incarnation of BAK competed several times, and a visit of Corinthian-Casuals supporters and officials in November 2018 sparked the renewal of the friendship between the two clubs.

BAK's friendship with Corinthian-Casuals led to the inauguration of a new international competition, called the Egri Erbstein Tournament, and designed to be an invitational event for like-minded, grass-roots football clubs from all over the world. The club announced that the first edition of the tournament would be held at the Szőnyi úti Stadion, in the Zugló district of Budapest, where BAK were originally based, in June 2019. The four competing clubs were announced as BAK, Corinthian-Casuals, Budapesti EAC and Testvériség SE and it was confirmed that the winner would be awarded the Corinthian Cup, a new trophy named after that which was originally presented to the amateur football clubs of Budapest by Corinthian FC in 1905.

== Name changes ==
- 1900–1910: Budapesti Athletikai Klub
- 1910: merger with Csepeli Athletikai Club
- 1910–1911: Budapest-Csepeli Athletikai Klub
- 1911–1926: Budapesti Atlétikai Klub
- 1920: merger with Nemzeti Torna Club
- 1926–1928: Budapesti Atlétikai Klub FC
- 1928 -: Budapesti Atlétikai Klub Testgyakorlók Köre
- 2018: re-established as Budapesti Atlétikai Klub

== Honours ==
=== League ===
- Nemzeti Bajnokság II:
  - Winners (1): 1905
- Hungarian Cup:
  - Runner-up (1): 1912–13

== Seasons ==
The table below shows the seasons of Budapesti AK.

Season	Tier	Club's name	Position	Pts
1901	2	Budapesti AK	4 / 8	15
1902	2	Budapesti AK	4 / 8	15
1903	2	Budapesti AK	5 / 6	2
1904	2	Budapesti AK	3 / 7	14
1905	2	Budapesti AK	1 / 9	32
1906	1	Budapesti AK	7 / 9	4
1906–07	1	Budapesti AK	4 / 8	14
1907–08	1	Budapesti AK	8 / 9	10
1908–09	1	Budapesti AK	6 / 9	14
1909–10	1	Budapesti AK	4 / 9	16
1910–11	1	Budapesti-Csepeli AK (BAK)	4 / 10	21
1911–12	1	Budapesti-Csepeli AK (BAK)	3 / 10	20
1912–13	1	Budapesti-Csepeli AK (BAK)	6 / 10	18
1913–14	1	Budapesti-Csepeli AK (BAK)	8 / 10	11
1914	1	Budapesti-Csepeli AK (BAK)	8 / 12	9
1915	1	Budapesti AK	11 / 12	6
1915	1	Budapesti-Csepeli AK (BAK)	8 / 14	14
1916	2	Budapesti AK	1 / 3	4
1916–17	1	Budapesti AK	7 / 12	18
1917–18	1	Budapesti AK	8 / 12	16
1918–19	1	Budapesti AK	11 / 12	13
1919–20	1	Budapesti AK	10 / 15	23
1920–21	1	Budapesti AK	12 / 15	18
1921–22	2	Budapesti AK	3 / 15	35
1922–23	2	Budapesti AK	4 / 15	31
1923–24	2	Budapesti AK	5 / 14	26
1924–25	2	Budapesti AK	5 / 14	23
1925–26	2	Budapesti AK	4 / 14	34
1926–27	2	BAK FC	3 / 14	37
1927–28	2	BAK FC	7 / 12	23
1928–29	2	BAK TK	10 / 12	12
1929–30	2	BAK TK	5 / 13	28
1930–31	2	BAK TK	6 / 12	22
1931–32	2	BAK TK	3 / 11	28
1932–33	2	BAK TK	4 / 14	34
1933–34	2	BAK TK	14 / 14	9
2018–19	6	Budapesti AK Respect	6 / 14	45
2019–20	6	Budapesti AK Respect	7 / 14	25
2020–21	6	Budapesti AK	7 / 14	42
2021–22	6	Budapesti AK	1 / 14	57
2022–23	5	Budapesti AK	12 / 14	18
2023–24	5	BAK FC	13 / 14	15
2024–25	6	BAK FC	3 / 13	50
2025–26	6	BAK FC	2 / 14	65
