= 1912–13 Magyar Kupa =

Tournament details
- Country: Hungary

Final positions
- Champions: Ferencvárosi TC
- Runners-up: Budapesti AK

The 1912–13 Magyar Kupa (English: Hungarian Cup) was the 4th season of Hungary's annual knock-out cup football competition.

== Final ==
1 June 1913
17:30 (UTC+2)

Ferencvárosi TC	2–1	Budapesti AK
Tóth Potya 18'; Schlosser 23'	Report	Schaffer 58'

Üllői úti stadion, Budapest
Attendance: 6,000
Referee: László Izsó (Hungary)

== See also ==
- 1912–13 Nemzeti Bajnokság I
