= Vieska nad Žitavou =

Vieska nad Žitavou Barskisfalud
- Municipality
- Flag

- Location of Vieska nad Žitavou in the Nitra Region Location of Vieska nad Žitavou in Slovakia
- Coordinates: 48.32°N 18.37°E
- Country: Slovakia
- Region: Nitra Region
- District: Zlaté Moravce District
- First mentioned: 1406

Area
  - Total: 5.46 km^{2} (2.11 sq mi)
- Elevation: 181 m (594 ft)

Population (2025)
  - Total: 427
- Time zone: UTC+1 (CET)
  - Summer (DST): UTC+2 (CEST)
- Postal code: 951 52
- Area code: +421 37
- Vehicle registration plate (until 2022): ZM
- Website: www.obec-vieskanadzitavou.sk

Vieska nad Žitavou (Hungarian: Barskisfalud) is a village and municipality in Zlaté Moravce District of the Nitra Region, in western-central Slovakia.

== History ==
In historical records the village was first mentioned in 1406.

== Geography ==
The municipality lies at an altitude of 181 metres (594 ft) and covers an area of 5.46 km^{2} (2.11 sq mi) (2025).

== Population ==
Population statistic (10 years)
Year	1995	2005	2015	2025
Count	501	440	463	427
Difference		−12.17%	+5.22%	−7.77%

Population statistic
Year	2024	2025
Count	436	427
Difference		−2.06%

It has a population of 427 people (31 December 2025).

=== Ethnicity ===
Census 2021 (1+ %)
Ethnicity	Number	Fraction
Slovak	457	98.7%
Czech	5	1.07%
Hungarian	5	1.07%
Total	463	

In year 2021 was 463 people by ethnicity 457 as Slovak, 5 as Czech, 5 as Hungarian, 2 as Other and 1 as Silesian.

Note on population: The difference values of population numbers in the table "Population statistic" and in the sections "Ethnicity" & "Religion" is caused by the use of various statistical methods.

=== Religion ===
Census 2021 (1+ %)
Religion	Number	Fraction
Roman Catholic Church	394	85.1%
None	54	11.66%
Total	463	

In year 2021 was 463 people by religion 394 from Roman Catholic Church, 54 from None, 4 from Not found out, 2 from Other and not ascertained christian church, 2 from Other, 2 from Seventh-day Adventist Church, 1 from Calvinist Church, 1 from Paganism and natural spirituality, 1 from Christian Congregations in Slovakia, 1 from Greek Catholic Church and 1 from Buddhism.
