= Budapesti TC =

Hungarian sports club

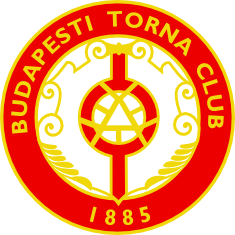
- Full name: Budapesti Torna Club
- Short name: BTC
- Founded: 1885 (Gymnastics); 1897 (Football section)
- Dissolved: 1946
- Ground: Millenáris Sporttelep
- Capacity: 8,130
Home colours

Budapesti Torna Club was a Hungarian sports club in Budapest and the first football club in the country. Its football team were the winners of the first two seasons of Nemzeti Bajnokság I, in 1901 and 1902.

== History ==
The club was founded on 21 January 1897. It was the first official football club to be founded in Hungary, and would soon be followed by many others. On 18 September that year it played the first official match in Hungarian history, between two internal teams, the blue-white one and the red-white one, with the former winning 5–0.

On 31 October it played the first international match of a Hungarian club, when it played against Austria's Vienna Cricket and Football Club in Vienna, losing 2–0.

It was one of the founders of the Hungarian football leagues, the Nemzeti Najnokság, and the winner of its first two editions.

After 1925 the club played only in the amateur leagues and it was dissolved during season 1945–46.

== Honours ==
- Nemzeti Bajnokság I
  - Winners (2): 1901, 1902
- Hungarian Cup
  - Runner-up (1): 1909–10

== Name changes ==
- 1885–1945: Budapesti Torna Club
- 1935: merger with Budapest SE
- ?: exit from Budapest SE

== Seasons ==
The table below shows the seasons of Budapesti TC.

Season	Tier	Club's name	Position	Pts
1901	1	Budapesti TC	1 / 5	16
1902	1	Budapesti TC	1 / 5	15
1903	1	Budapesti TC	2 / 8	19
1904	1	Budapesti TC	3 / 9	22
1907–08	1	Budapesti TC	6 / 9	13
1908–09	1	Budapesti TC	3 / 9	21
1909–10	1	Budapesti TC	5 / 9	14
1910–11	1	Budapesti TC	5 / 10	18
1911–12	1	Budapesti TC	8 / 10	15
1912–13	1	Budapesti TC	3 / 10	24
1913–14	1	Budapesti TC	4 / 10	22
1914	1	Budapesti TC	2 / 12	16
1915	1	Budapesti TC	10 / 12	9
1915	1	Budapesti TC	3 / 14	17
1916	2	Budapesti TC	7 / 8	2
1916–17	1	Budapesti TC	9 / 12	16
1917–18	1	Budapesti TC	9 / 12	14
1918–19	1	Budapesti TC	9 / 12	17
1919–20	1	Budapesti TC	5 / 15	30
1920–21	1	Budapesti TC	8 / 15	21
1921–22	1	Budapesti TC	8 / 12	19
1922–23	1	Budapesti TC	9 / 12	17
1923–24	1	Budapesti TC	4 / 12	25
1924–25	1	Budapesti TC	12 / 12	12
1925–26	2	Budapesti TC	9 / 13	15
1926–27	2	Budapesti TC	7 / 17	39
1927–28	2	Budapesti TC	8 / 14	25
1928–29	2	Budapesti TC	6 / 10	17
1929–30	2	Budapesti TC	12 / 14	22
1930–31	2	Budapesti TC	13 / 14	16
1931–32	3	Budapesti TC	11 / 14	22
1932–33	3	Budapesti TC	11 / 14	17
1933–34	3	Budapesti TC	3 / 14	38
1934–35	3	Budapesti TC	11 / 15	23
1935–36	2	Budapesti TC	3 / 13	31
1936–37	2	Budapesti TC	12 / 12	1
1937–38	3	Budapesti TC	13 / 14	14
1938–39	4	Budapesti TC	14 / 14	3
1939–40	4	Budapesti TC	11 / 13	14
1940–41	5	Budapesti TC	11 / 14	18
1941–42	5	Budapesti TC	3 / 14	36
1942–43	4	Budapesti TC	10 / 14	22
1943–44	4	Budapesti TC	8 / 13	19
1944–45	3	Budapesti TC	11 / 14	2
1945–46	3	Budapesti TC	12 / 12	-

== Managers ==
- Emil Rauchmaul (1930–1931)
