= 1913–14 Nemzeti Bajnokság I =

Nemzeti Bajnokság I
- Season: 1913–14
- Country: Hungary
- Champions: MTK

Statistics of Nemzeti Bajnokság I for the 1913–14 season.

== Overview ==
It was contested by 10 teams, and MTK Hungária FC won the championship.

== League standings ==
Pos	Team	Pld	W	D	L	GF	GA	GR	Pts
1	MTK Budapest FC	18	15	3	0	56	12	4.667	33
2	Ferencvárosi TC	18	13	1	4	61	28	2.179	27
3	Törekvés SE	18	9	5	4	41	24	1.708	23
4	Budapesti TC	18	9	4	5	45	19	2.368	22
5	Magyar AC	18	7	4	7	27	38	0.711	18
6	33 FC	18	6	3	9	15	36	0.417	15
7	Újpest FC	18	4	4	10	28	52	0.538	12
8	Budapesti AK	18	5	1	12	19	32	0.594	11
9	III. Kerületi TUE	18	3	4	11	22	37	0.595	10
10	Nemzeti SC	18	3	3	12	17	53	0.321	9

Source: rsssf.com

== Results ==
Home \ Away	33F	KER	BAK	BTC	FTC	MAC	MTK	NEM	TÖR	ÚJP
33 FC		1–0	1–0	0–3	0–3	0–0	0–1	2–1	1–2	2–0
III. Kerület	2–0		1–2	1–6	2–4	0–3	2–2	3–0	2–0	1–1
Budapesti AK	0–1	2–2		2–0	1–3	0–1	0–1	1–2	1–3	1–3
Budapesti TC	3–0	3–2	0–1		0–1	2–2	1–3	2–2	0–0	3–0
Ferencváros	8–0	5–0	3–2	1–3		4–3	1–4	8–0	3–2	5–1
Magyar AC	2–3	2–1	1–0	0–6	3–2		0–7	2–1	2–2	3–1
MTK Budapest	1–1	2–1	7–1	1–0	3–2	3–0		4–1	3–0	5–0
Nemzeti	2–2	2–1	0–1	0–6	1–4	2–1	0–3		0–5	1–5
Törekvés	2–1	1–0	3–1	2–2	1–1	3–1	2–2	1–0		3–4
Újpest	6–0	1–1	0–3	1–5	2–3	1–1	0–4	2–2	0–9	

Source: rsssf.com
Legend: Blue = home team win; Yellow = draw; Red = away team win.
