= 1910–11 Nemzeti Bajnokság I =

Nemzeti Bajnokság I
- Season: 1910–11
- Country: Hungary
- Champions: Ferencvárosi TC

Statistics of Nemzeti Bajnokság I for the 1910–11 season.

== Overview ==
It was contested by 10 teams, and Ferencvárosi TC won the championship.

== League standings ==
Pos	Team	Pld	W	D	L	GF	GA	GR	Pts
1	Ferencvárosi TC	18	16	0	2	77	19	4.053	32
2	MTK Budapest FC	18	10	4	4	37	18	2.056	24
3	Törekvés SE	18	9	4	5	44	33	1.333	22
4	Budapesti AK	18	9	3	6	38	28	1.357	21
5	Budapesti TC	18	7	4	7	29	33	0.879	18
6	Magyar AC	18	8	1	9	32	35	0.914	17
7	Terézvárosi TC	18	5	3	10	18	48	0.375	13
8	Nemzeti SC	18	4	4	10	26	40	0.650	12
9	33 FC	18	4	5	9	18	37	0.486	11 (Note: 2 points deducted.)
10	Újpest FC	18	2	4	12	23	51	0.451	8

Source: rsssf.com

== Results ==
Home \ Away	33F	BAK	BTC	FTC	MAC	MTK	NEM	TER	TÖR	ÚJP
33 FC		1–5	1–2	1–7	1–2	0–0	4–2	5–0	1–1	0–2
Budapesti AK	4–2		2–2	0–3	2–1	2–0	2–1	4–0	2–3	0–1
Budapesti TC	3–0	1–4		0–5	0–3	0–0	2–3	2–0	5–4	0–0
Ferencváros	7–1	4–2	3–2		0–3	1–2	8–3	4–0	4–1	7–0
Magyar AC	3–1	1–0	3–1	1–5		1–4	2–3	5–1	1–2	1–2
MTK Budapest	6–1	2–1	1–3	1–2	3–0		0–1	3–1	2–0	3–1
Nemzeti	2–1	2–2	0–1	1–3	2–2	0–0		2–3	1–3	2–3
Terézváros	1–1	2–2	2–1	0–7	3–0	0–2	1–0		0–1	2–2
Törekvés	2–0	2–3	1–1	1–5	4–1	3–3	3–1	7–0		1–1
Újpest	2–2	0–1	1–2	0–2	0–2	1–5	0–0	0–2	2–5	

Source: rsssf.com
Legend: Blue = home team win; Yellow = draw; Red = away team win.
