= Millenáris Sporttelep =

Velodrome in Budapest, Hungary

Coordinates: 47°30′22″N 19°5′41″E

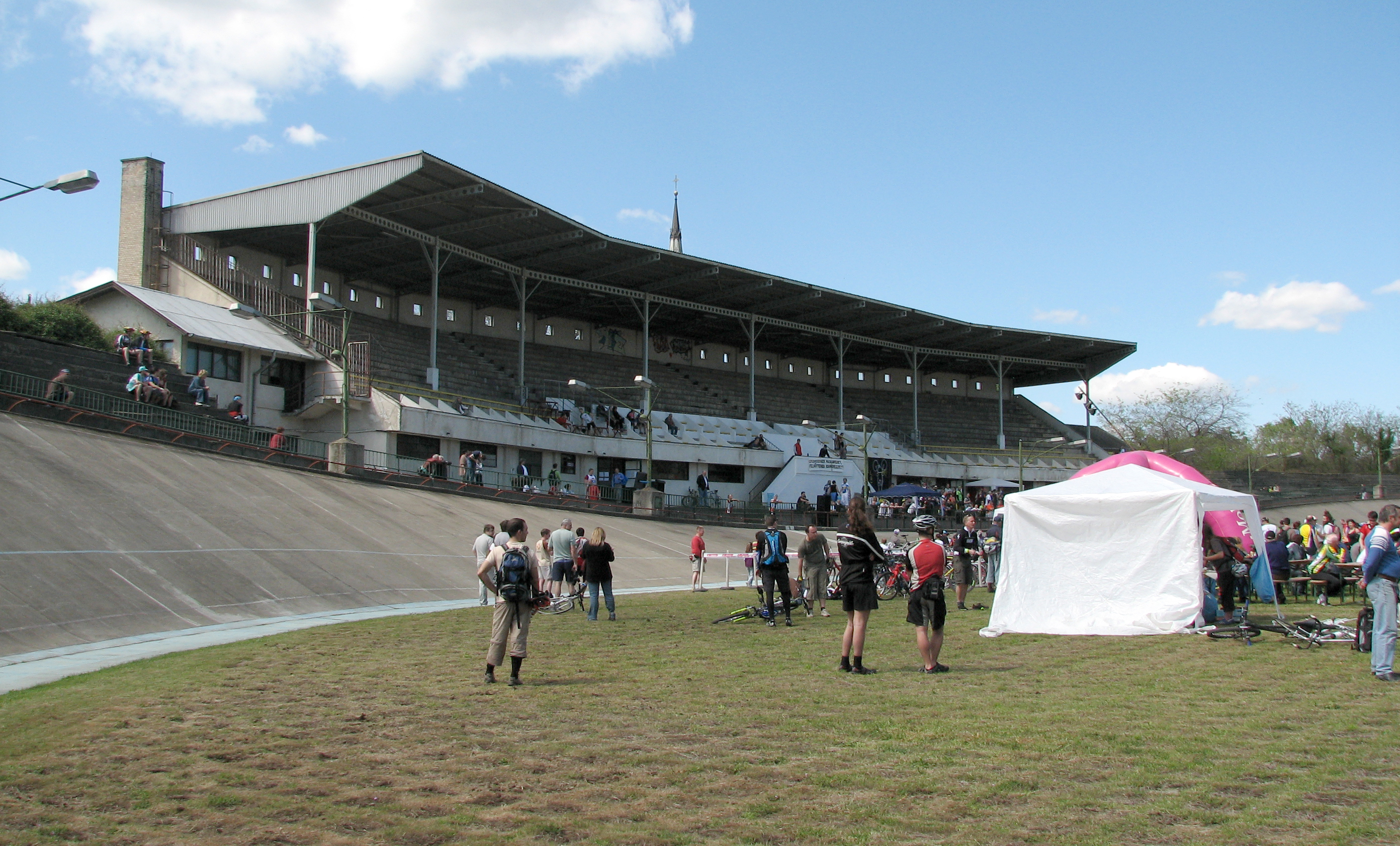
- Grandstand of the velodrome
- Interactive map of Millenáris Sporttelep
- Full name: Millenáris Sporttelep
- Location: Budapest, Hungary
- Capacity: 8,130

Construction
- Opened: May 14, 1896
- Architect: Alfréd Hajós

Millenáris Sporttelep is a multi-use velodrome in Budapest, Hungary. It is currently used mostly for cycling events but has also been used for football matches. The venue has a capacity of 8,130 spectators and it opened in 1896. The track is 412 m (451 yd) and made of concrete.

== Other events ==
- Budapest Fringe Festival
- Africa Days and Vízibility, organised by Foundation for Africa

== Image gallery ==
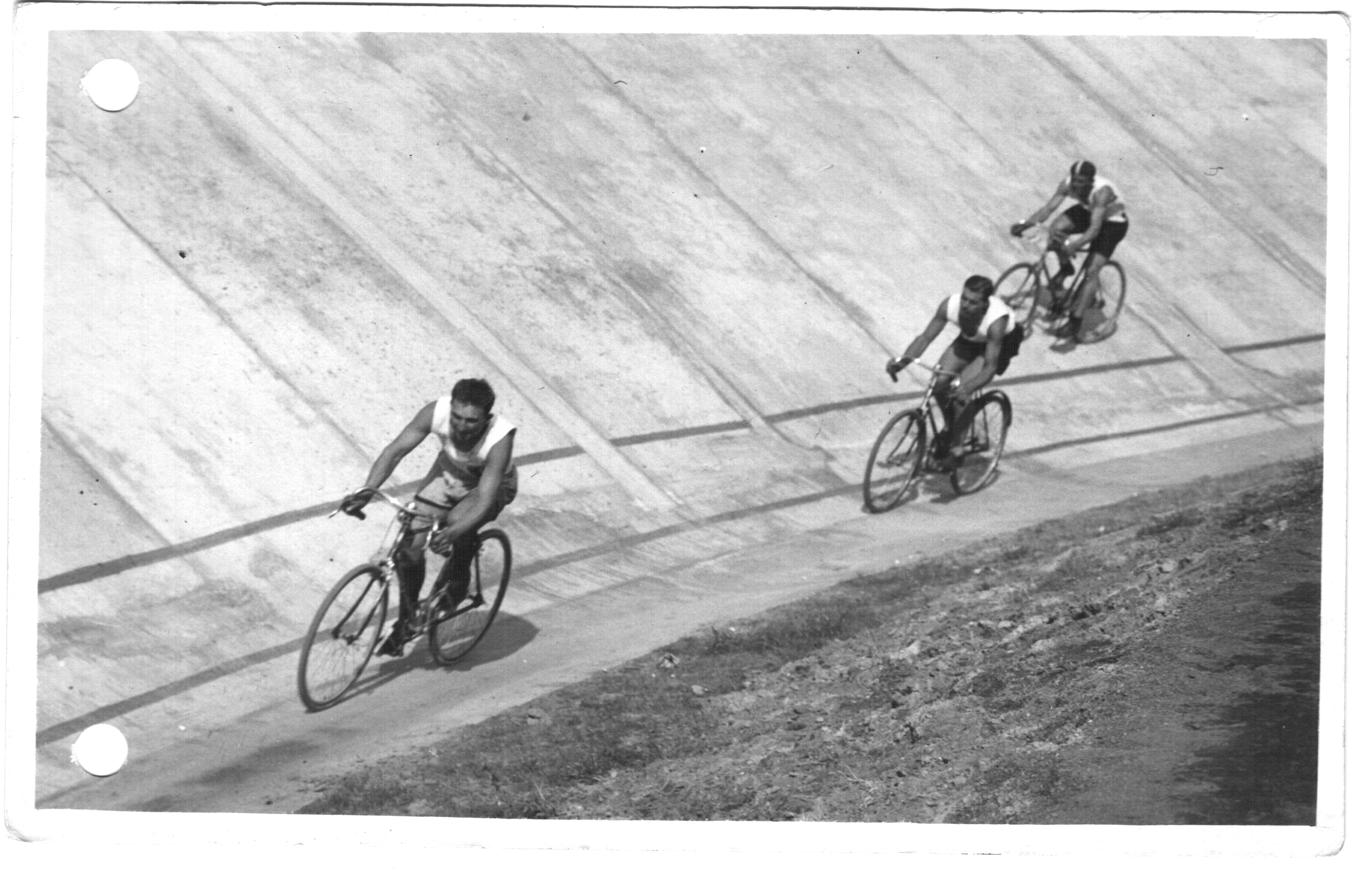
Sport festival in 1928

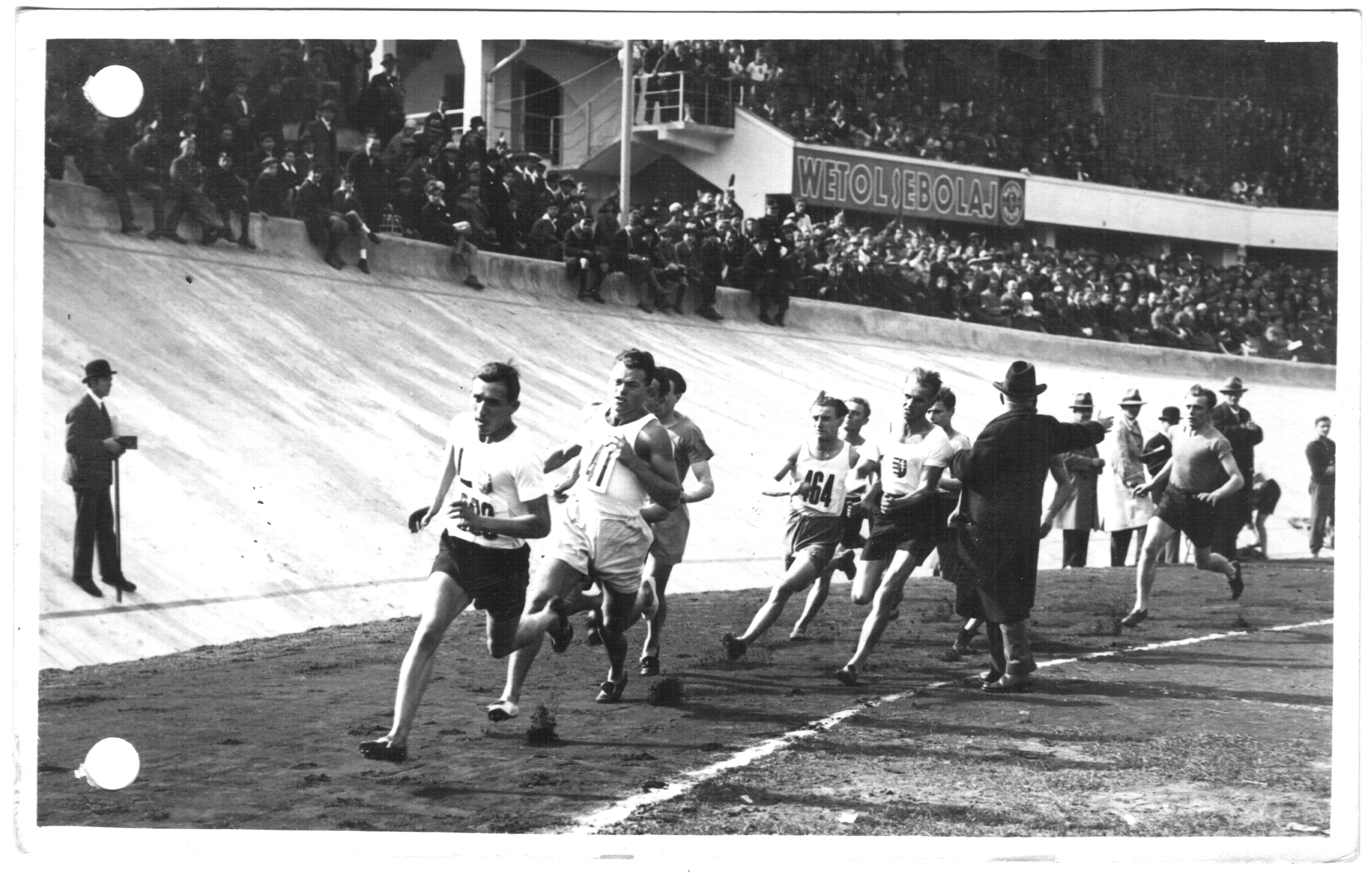
Running event at a sport festival in 1928

== See also ==
- List of cycling tracks and velodromes

| Preceded by Unknown velodrome Cologne | UCI Track Cycling World Championships; Venue; 1928 | Succeeded by Unknown velodrome Zürich |
