= 1909–10 Nemzeti Bajnokság I =

Nemzeti Bajnokság I
- Season: 1909–10
- Country: Hungary
- Champions: Ferencvárosi TC

Statistics of Nemzeti Bajnokság I for the 1909–10 season.

== Overview ==
It was contested by 9 teams, and Ferencvárosi TC won the championship.

== League standings ==
Pos	Team	Pld	W	D	L	GF	GA	GR	Pts
1	Ferencvárosi TC	16	13	1	2	52	17	3.059	27
2	MTK Budapest FC	16	11	3	2	42	24	1.750	25
3	Nemzeti SC	16	9	0	7	33	30	1.100	18
4	Budapesti AK	16	8	0	8	23	28	0.821	16
5	Budapesti TC	16	6	2	8	32	34	0.941	14
6	Terézvárosi TC	16	6	2	8	22	30	0.733	14
7	Újpest FC	16	6	1	9	27	33	0.818	13
8	Törekvés SE	16	4	2	10	19	31	0.613	10
9	Magyar AC	16	3	1	12	26	49	0.531	7

Source: rsssf.com

== Results ==
Home \ Away	BAK	BTC	FTC	MAC	MTK	NEM	TER	TÖR	ÚJP
Budapesti AK		2–1	1–5	1–3	0–2	4–1	1–2	2–1	1–0
Budapesti TC	0–1		3–5	2–1	2–4	3–1	0–0	2–1	2–1
Ferencváros	3–0	4–2		4–0	3–3	0–1	6–0	1–2	6–2
Magyar AC	1–3	2–5	1–2		2–4	2–8	1–2	2–1	2–3
MTK Budapest	2–0	2–1	0–2	5–2		4–2	4–1	1–1	3–1
Nemzeti	2–1	0–4	0–2	4–2	2–3		1–0	3–2	3–0
Terézváros	3–2	3–3	1–2	1–2	0–2	2–1		2–1	0–2
Törekvés SE	0–1	2–1	0–4	1–0	3–3	1–3	2–1		1–3
Újpest	2–3	5–1	1–3	3–3	2–0	0–1	0–4	2–0	

Source: rsssf.com
Legend: Blue = home team win; Yellow = draw; Red = away team win.
