= 1912–13 Nemzeti Bajnokság I =

Nemzeti Bajnokság I
- Season: 1912–13
- Country: Hungary
- Champions: Ferencvárosi TC

Statistics of Nemzeti Bajnokság I for the 1912–13 season.

== Overview ==
It was contested by 10 teams, and Ferencvárosi TC won the championship.

== League standings ==
Pos	Team	Pld	W	D	L	GF	GA	GR	Pts
1	Ferencvárosi TC	18	16	1	1	77	13	5.923	33
2	MTK Budapest FC	18	12	2	4	50	18	2.778	26
3	Budapesti TC	18	10	4	4	27	13	2.077	24
4	Magyar AC	18	12	0	6	39	24	1.625	24
5	33 FC	18	8	3	7	35	33	1.061	19
6	Budapesti AK	18	7	4	7	32	39	0.821	18
7	Törekvés SE	18	5	4	9	25	45	0.556	14
8	Újpest FC	18	4	4	10	24	40	0.600	12
9	Nemzeti SC	18	2	2	14	19	68	0.279	6
10	Terézvárosi TC	18	1	2	15	22	57	0.386	4

Source: rsssf.com

== Results ==
Home \ Away	33F	BAK	BTC	FTC	MAC	MTK	NEM	TER	TÖR	ÚJP
33 FC		2–2	2–4	1–2	0–1	1–4	3–1	3–2	2–1	4–1
Budapesti AK	1–2		0–0	0–7	0–3	3–2	3–2	6–1	2–5	3–3
Budapesti TC	0–0	2–0		1–0	4–2	3–1	2–0	2–1	0–0	0–1
Ferencváros	3–1	4–1	3–1		7–0	2–2	13–1	3–1	6–0	5–1
Magyar AC	4–1	0–1	1–0	-:+ (Note: The match was settled with a goalless victory for Ferencváros.)		0–2	4–2	3–1	4–0	3–0
MTK Budapest	2–1	0–1	1–1	1–3	1–0		2–0	8–0	4–1	3–0
Nemzeti	0–3	3–1	0–3	0–8	3–5	0–6		2–1	0–1	0–5
Terézváros	1–2	1–4	0–3	1–4	1–4	0–4	2–2		1–3	2–2
Törekvés	3–3	0–2	1–0	1–7	1–4	2–3	2–2	2–1		2–4
Újpest	1–4	2–2	0–1	-:+	0–1	0–4	4–1	0–5	0–0	

Source: rsssf.com
Legend: Blue = home team win; Yellow = draw; Red = away team win.
