= Elemér Berkessy =

Hungarian footballer and coach (1905–1993)

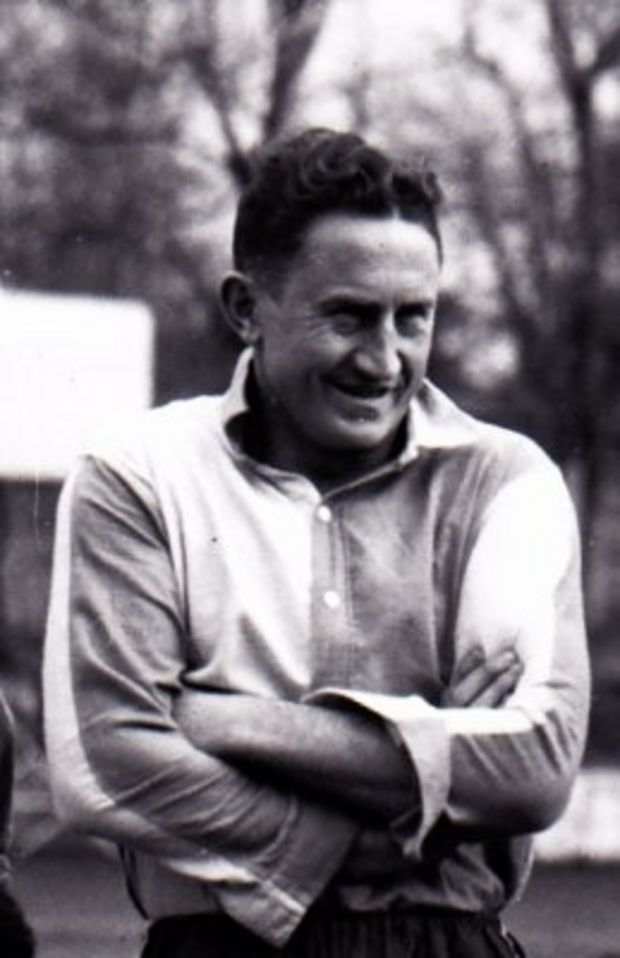

Personal information
- Full name: Elemér Berkessy Cöji
- Date of birth: 20 June 1905
- Place of birth: Nagyvárad,Oradea Austria-Hungary
- Date of death: 7 July 1993 (aged 88)
- Place of death: Barcelona, Spain
- Position: Midfielder

Senior career*
Years	Team	Apps	(Gls)
1921–1923	CA Oradea		
1923–1930	CAM Petroşani		
1930–1932	Ferencvárosi TC	25	(0)
1932–1934	RC Paris		
1934–1936	FC Barcelona	52	(8)
1936–1937	Le Havre AC		

International career
1928–1930	Hungary	7	(0)

Managerial career
- 1939-40: Tatabánya Miner
- 1941-42: Salgótarján Miner
- 1942-44: Szegedi VSE
- 1944: Ferencváros
- 1946-47: Szegedi AK
- 1948–1949: Vicenza Calcio
- A.S. Biellese 1902
- Pro Patria
- Rosignano Calcio
- 1951–1952: Real Zaragoza
- 1954: Grimsby Town F.C.
- 1955–1957: K. Beerschot V.A.C.
- 1957–1958: RCD Espanyol
- 1958: Sabadell
- * Club domestic league appearances and goals

Elemér Berkessy (20 June 1905 – 7 July 1993), also referred to as Emilio Berkessy or Emil Berkessy, was a Hungarian footballer and coach.

== Playing career ==
Berkessy joined Ferencváros in 1928, and with them he was the champion of Hungary twice, in 1927-28 and in 1931-32, helping his team winning the championship with a 100 percent result in the 1931-32 season. He was also part of the team that won the 1927-28 Hungarian Cup and the 1928 Mitropa Cup. He was also capped 7 times for Hungary.

He then moved to Western Europe, first in the newly founded Division 1 with RC Paris, before moving to FC Barcelona. He won the Catalonia Cup with FC Barcelona both in the 1934–35 and in the 1935-36 season. Berkessy finished his player career in France with Le Havre AC of Division 2.

== Coach career ==
After his playing career, he became a coach, starting off as the head coach of Tatabánya Miner in 1939. Between 1941 and 1947 he coached four other Hungarian teams (Salgótarján Miner, Szegedi VSE, Ferencváros, Szegedi AK), but the highlight of his coaching career came in Italy with Vicenza Calcio, A.S. Biellese 1902, Rosignano Calcio and Spain with Real Zaragoza, RCD Espanyol and Sabadell. He also became the first foreign manager in the Football League in 1954 with Grimsby Town F.C.

== Honours ==
Ferencvárosi TC

- Hungarian Championship League
- Champions (2): 1927-28 and 1931-32
- Runner-up (3): 1928-29 and 1929-30

- Hungarian Cup
- Champions (1): 1927–28
- Runner-up (1): 1931–32

- Mitropa Cup
- Champions (1): 1928 Mitropa Cup
