= History of Ferencvárosi TC =

Ferencvárosi Torna Club is a Hungarian professional football club based in Budapest, Hungary. They are the most decorated club in Hungary, in which they won a record of 31 national titles and 23 national cups.

== 1900s ==
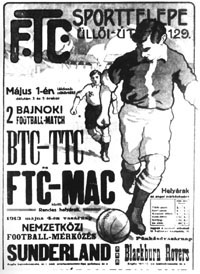
A billboard from 1913 including the advertisement of international matches against Sunderland and Blackburn Rovers, and NB I matches BTC-TTC and FTC-MAC

On 3 May 1899, Ferencvárosi TC was founded by citizens of the ninth district of Budapest. Ferenc Springer, a lawyer from the same district, was nominated as the first chairman of the club. The club's budget was raised by a ball held in order to celebrate the establishment of the club. The club's first pitch was built on Soroksári avenue in the ninth district.

On 3 December 1900, the football department of Ferencváros was officially founded. Two months later, in February, the first match of the Hungarian League was played between Ferencváros and Budapesti TC. Since the match was not announced to the Hungarian Football Federation, it is not considered as the club's first official match.

On 21 April 1900, the team played their first official match against Műegyetemi AFC and Ferencváros lost their first match 5–3. The first goal for the club was scored by Gáspár Borbás. The first point in the championship was gained against Műegyetemi AFC with a draw. The first victory came on 16 June 1901, when Ferencváros beat Budapesti SC 5–1.

In 1902, Ferencváros suffered the heaviest defeat in their history when they were beaten by 16–0 by Oxford United.

Ferencváros played their first match in an international competition against Budapesti TC in the 1901–02 Challenge Cup on 27 April 1902. Ferencváros lost to 5–1 against their home rival in the Hungarian Final of the Challenge Cup.

Ferencváros entered the 1902–03 Challenge Cup and won the Hungarian Final against 33 FC 1–0. In the semi-finals, Ferencváros played their first official international match against Wiener Athletiksport Club and lost to 5–1 on 3 May 1903.

The 1903 season of the Hungarian League was won by Ferencváros. Two years later, in 1905, Ferencváros became Hungarian champions for the second time.

The 1906–07 season was won by Ferencváros.

Ferencváros participated in the 1908–09 Challenge Cup. On 10 April 1909, Ferencváros beat VfB Leipzig 4–1. On 11 April 1909, Ferencváros drew with Budapesti TC and on 12 April 1909 Ferencváros beat MTK Budapest 2–1. As a consequence, Ferencváros finished first in the main tournament and qualified for the final of the 1908–09 Challenge Cup. On 13 June 1909, Ferencváros beat Wiener Sport-Club 2–1 at the Hohe Warte Stadium.

Ferencváros won the 1908–09 and 1909–10 seasons of the Hungarian League.

== 1910s ==
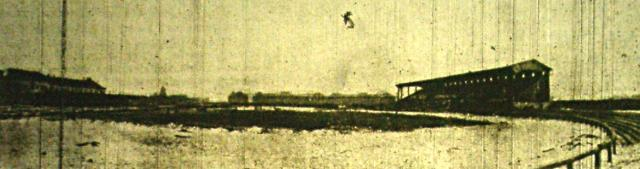
The first stadium of the club was inaugurated on 12 February 1911

The 1910–11, 1911–12, and 1912–13 seasons of the Hungarian League were won by Ferencváros. In the 1911–12 season, Ferencváros beat III. Kerületi TUE 11–3. Imre Schlosser scored 8 goals which is still a club record for a single match.

On 12 February 1911, the club's current stadium was inaugurated. The first goal in the new stadium was scored by Imre Schlosser.

In 1911, December Ferencváros went on a European tour. On 24 December 1911, the first match was won by Ferencváros 5–3 against Viktoria Hamburg in Hamburg, Kingdom of Prussia. On 25 December 1911, Ferencváros beat Bremen SC 5–0 and on 30 December 1911 Ferencváros beat Hertha BSC 4–2 in Berlin, Kingdom of Prussia. On 1 January 1912, Ferencváros beat BFC Preussen 7–2 in Berlin. On 8 January 1912, won for the first time in England by beating Woking 3–2 in London, The United Kingdom. On 10 January 1929, Ferencváros lost their last match 4–1 against English Wanderers in London, The United Kingdom.

In 1914, the First World War broke out which affected Ferencváros since many of the club's players were enlisted and many of them have never returned. The Hungarian Football Federation did not organise any competitions between the 1913–14 and the 1916–17 seasons.

== 1920s ==
The 1920s did not start good for Ferencváros since their rivals MTK Budapest won five consecutive Hungarian League titles. Furthermore, in the 1924–25 season, Ferencváros lost 14–2 to MTK Hungária FC which has been the biggest defeat in the Hungarian League. However, in 1926, Ferencváros became Hungarian champion again after 13 years. Ferencváros won the 1926–27 and the 1927–28 seasons of the Hungarian League.

Ferencváros entered the Mitropa Cup 1928 and won the first tie against BSK Beograd 7–0 in Belgrade, Yugoslavia on 19 August. The return match was won by Ferencváros 6–1 on 26 August. In the semi-finals, Ferencváros beat SK Admira Wien 2–1 at the Hohe Warte Stadium on 9 September 1928. The second tie was also won by Ferencváros 1–0 at the Üllői úti Stadion. In the final Ferencváros beat Rapid Wien 7–1 at the Üllői úti Stadion on 28 October 1928. The return match was won by SK Rapid Wien by 5–3 on 11 November 1928.

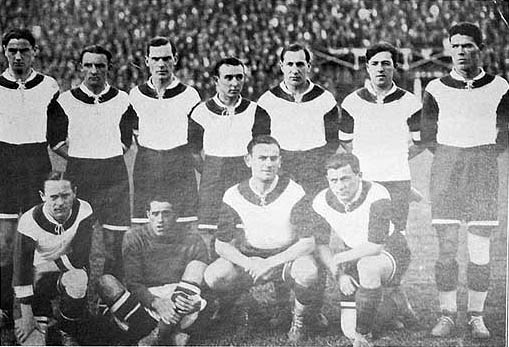
Team that toured South America in 1929

Ferencváros participated in a South American tour in Brazil, Uruguay, and Argentina playing in four different cities: São Paulo, Rio de Janeiro, Montevideo and Buenos Aires. On 30 June 1929, Ferencváros beat a São Paulo combined team 2–1 at Parque Antarctica Stadium of São Paulo. On 4 July 1929, Ferencváros drew with Fluminense (1–1) and the Rio de Janeiro Select 3–3 in Rio de Janeiro. On 11 July 1929, Ferencváros lost to Brazil at Estádio das Laranjeiras, Rio de Janeiro. On 14 July 1929, Ferencváros lost to Palestra Itália 5–2 and on 21 July 1929 Ferencváros beat Uruguay in Montevideo. On 25 July 1929, Ferencváros beat 4–1 a Montevideo combined and lost to Uruguay 3–0, both played at Estadio Gran Parque Central. The next series of matches were played in Argentina, where Ferencváros beat River Plate 4–3 in Buenos Aires on 1 August 1929. On 3 August 1929, Ferencváros flew back to Montevideo where they lost to Peñarol 2–0. On 5 August 1929, Ferencváros played in Avellaneda against Racing and won 2–1. On 10 August 1929, Ferencváros lost 2–0 to Argentina national team at River Plate Stadium. On 13 August 1929, Ferencváros repeatedly beat Racing 2–1 also in River Plate. The last match was played on 17 August 1929 against São Paulo. Ferencváros lost to 2–1 in Parque Antarctica, SP.

Ferencváros entered the Mitropa Cup 1930 and drew (2–2) with Slavia Prague in Prague, Czechoslovakia. The home match was won by Ferencváros by 1–0 in the quarter-finals. In the semi-finals, Ferencváros lost the away match 5–0 against Rapid Wien. The home match was won by 1–0 by Ferencváros but Rapid Wien qualified for the finals on 5–1 aggregate.

== 1930s ==
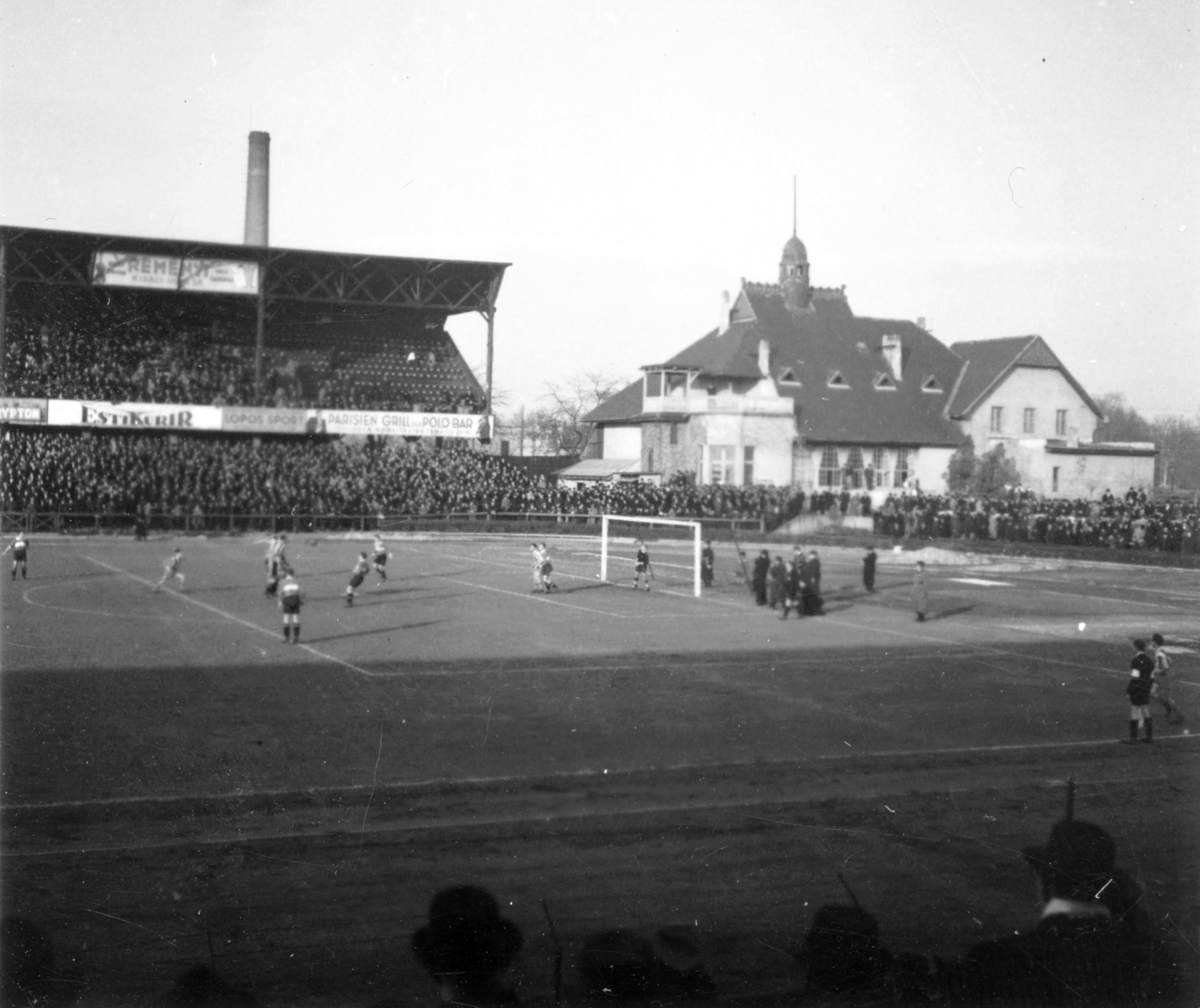
The B stand with the club's house next to it.

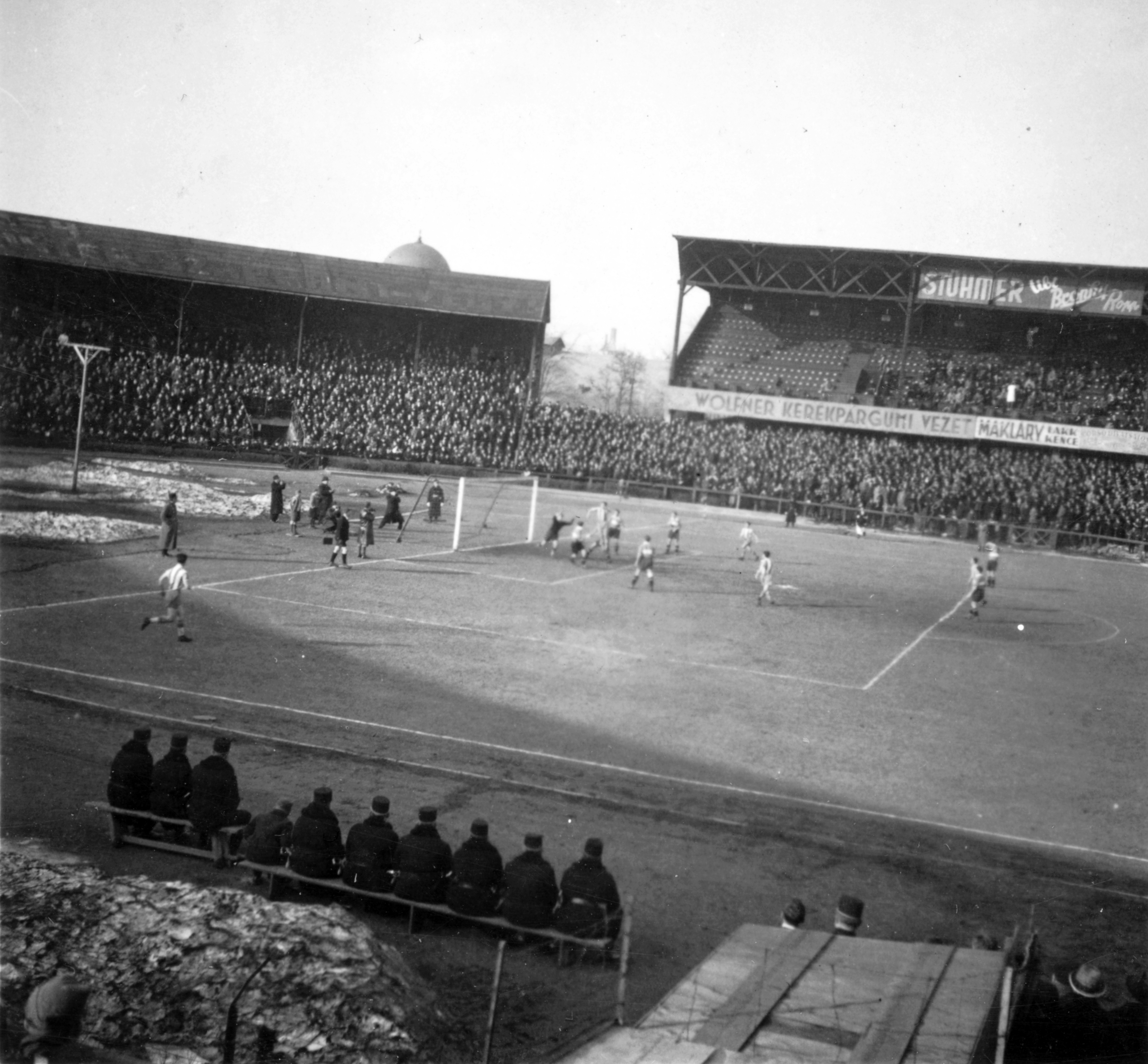
The B stand at Üllői úti stadion

In the 1930s, Ferencváros won the Hungarian League four times in 1932, 1934, 1938, and 1940.

In the 1931–32 season of the Hungarian League, Ferencváros won all 22 matches, which is still a record in the Hungarian League and during this season the team scored their 400th goal in the championship.

Ferencváros entered the Mitropa Cup 1932 season and lost 4–0 to Juventus in Turin, Italy. The home match was a 3–3 draw which resulted the elimination of the club from the Mitropa Cup 1932.

According to the French magazine, L'Auto, Ferencváros was the seventh best team in Europe in 1933.

Ferencváros played in the Mitropa Cup 1934 season. In the first round, Ferencváros beat Floridsdorfer AC 8–0 at home and 2–1 away. In the quarter-finals, Ferencváros beat SK Kladno 6–0 at home and lost to 4–1 away. In the semi-finals, Ferencváros drew (1–1) with AC Bologna and lost the away match 5–1 which resulted the farewell for the club from the Mitropa Cup 1934.

Ferencváros participated in the Mitropa Cup 1935 season. Ferencváros played their first match of the season against Roma in Rome, Italy in the first round. The first leg of the tie was won by Roma by 3–1, but the second leg was won by Ferencváros 8–0. In the quarter-finals, Ferencváros lost 4–2 to SK Židenice in Brno, Czechoslovakia, but the second leg was won by Ferencváros 6–1. In the semi-finals, Ferencváros beat Austria Wien 4–2 and lost the away match 3–2. In the final, Ferencváros beat Sparta Prague 2–1 at home on 8 September, but lost to 3–0 in Prague, Czechoslovakia.

Ferencváros participated in the Mitropa Cup 1936 season. Ferencváros entered the first round and won the first tie 5–2 against Slavia Prague, but the away match was lost to 4–0. Therefore, Ferencváros was eliminated from the Mitropa Cup 1936.

In 1937, Ferencváros participated in the Mitropa Cup. In the first round, Ferencváros played in Prague, Czechoslovakia and drew (2–2) with Slavia Prague. At home, Ferencváros beat Slavia Prague 3–1 and qualified for the next round. In the quarter-finals, Ferencváros hosted First Vienna FC and beat them 2–1, while the away match was lost to 1–0. The tie was decided on a play-off which was won by Ferencváros 2–1. In the semi-finals, Ferencváros lost to Austria Wien 4–1 in Wien, Austria while won the home match was won by Ferencváros 6–1 and qualified for the finals. In the final of the Mitrop Cup 1937, Ferencváros beat Lazio 4–2 at home on 12 September and 5–4 in Rome, Italy on 24 October.

== 1940s ==
In the 1940s, Ferencváros celebrated two Hungarian League titles in 1941 and in 1949. In the 1940–41 season, the team scored more than one hundred goals. In the 1940s, Ferencváros were the first team to fly to the United States. On 31 October 1948, Ferencváros played their 1000th match in the Hungarian National Championship I. In the 1948–49 season, the team celebrated their 50th anniversary with a gold medal. During this season, the team scored 140 goals in 30 matches (Ferenc Deák scored 59 goals). The team won the Hungarian Cup three times in 1942, 1943, and 1944.

== 1950s ==
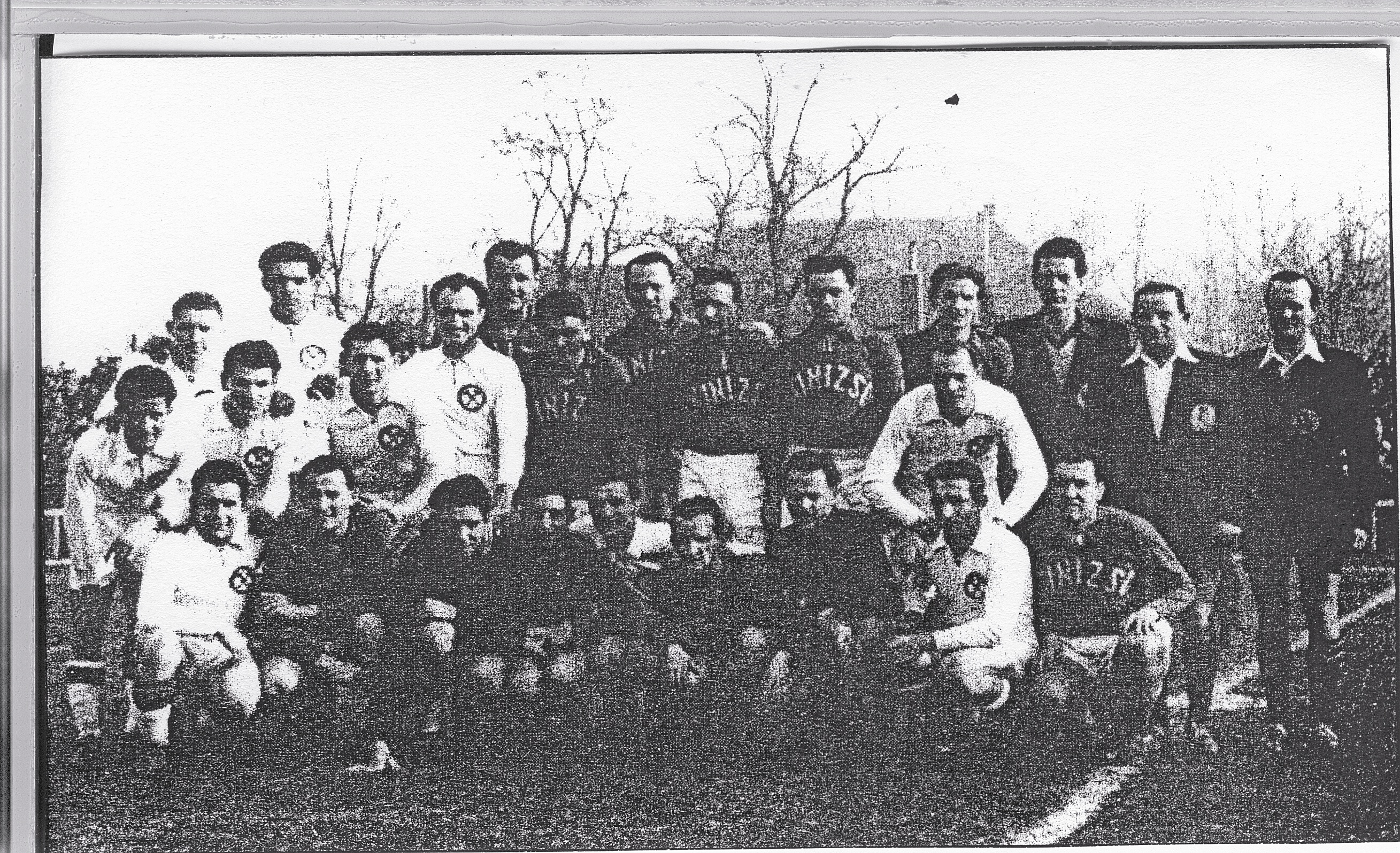
After a Dorog-Ferencváros match in the Hungarian League from the 1950s. From 1951 to 1956 Ferencváros were called Kinizsi due to political reasons

The 1950s was dominated by Budapest Honvéd and Ferencváros failed to win any Hungarian League titles. However, Ferencváros won the Hungarian Cup title in 1958. In 1951, the team changed their name to Kinizsi.

== 1960s ==
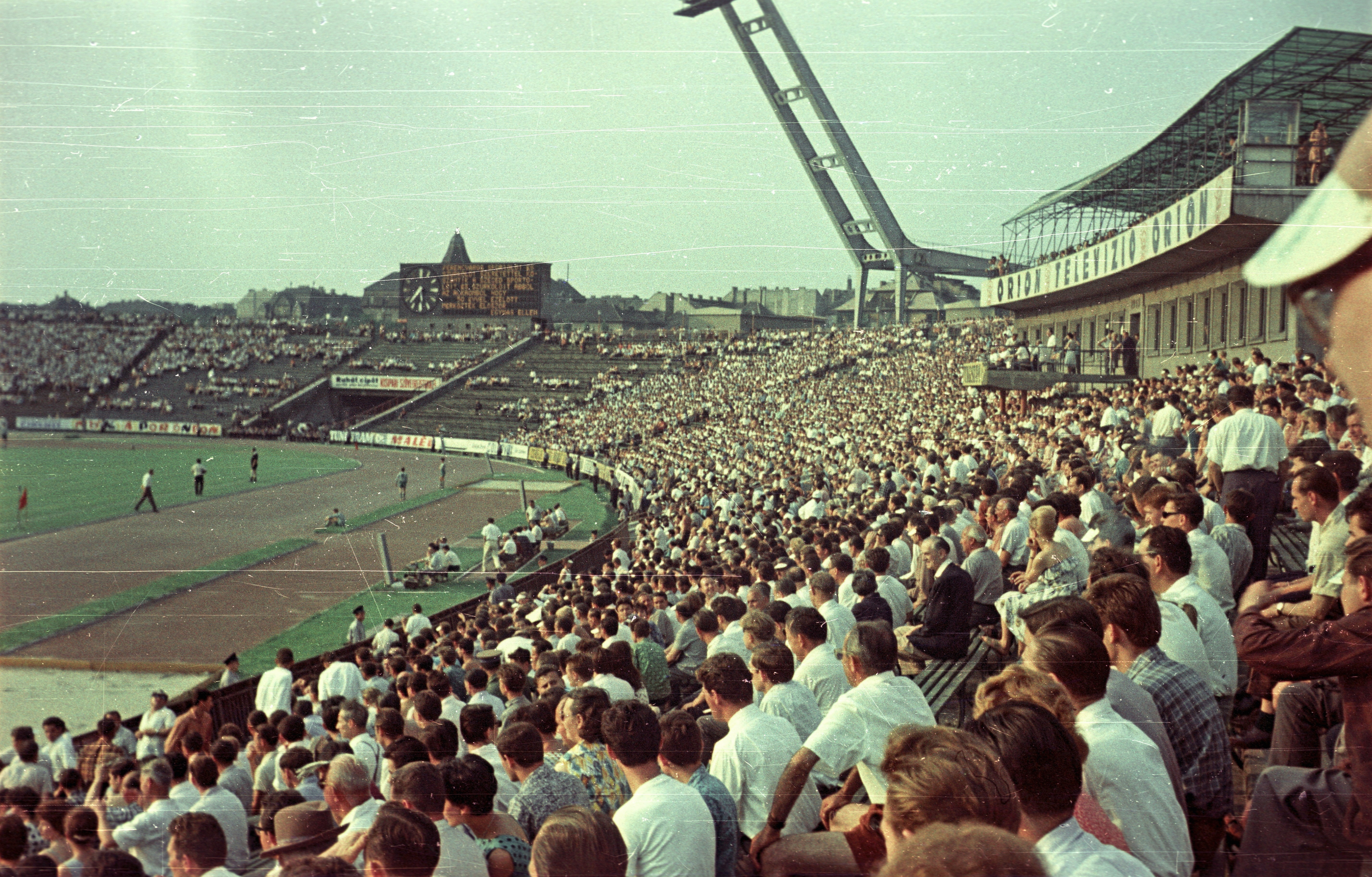
Ferencváros-Szegedi EAC on 30 June 1963

In the 1960s, Ferencváros won the Hungarian League four times (1963, 1964, 1967, and 1968). Ferencváros played in three European finals, the 1964–65 Inter-Cities Fairs Cup against Juventus, the 1967–68 Inter-Cities Fairs Cup against Leeds United and the 1974–75 UEFA Cup Winners' Cup against Dynamo Kyiv. Although Ferencváros only won the 1964–65 Inter-Cities Fairs Cup, they are the only Hungarian team to win a European trophy.

Ferencváros entered the first season of the UEFA Cup Winners' Cup, the 1960–61 UEFA Cup Winners' Cup. In the first round, Ferencváros lost 4–2 to Rangers in Glasgow, Scotland on 1 August 1960. The second round was won by Ferencváros 2–1 at home on 11 August 1960.

Ferencváros entered the 1962–63 Inter-Cities Fairs Cup season. In the first round Ferencváros lost 4–3 the first leg to Viktoria Köln, in Köln, Germany, while the second leg was won by Ferencváros 4–1. In the second round, on 1 December 1962 Ferencváros lost 1–0 to Sampdoria in Genoa, Italy. On 12 December 1962, Ferencváros beat Sampdoria 6–0 at home. In the quarter-finals Ferencváros beat Petrolul Ploiești 2–0 at home, while lost the away match 1–0 in Ploiești, Romania. In the semi-finals, Ferencváros lost to NK Dinamo Zagreb 1–0 at home and Ferencváros lost the away match 2–1 in Zagreb, Yugoslavia.

Ferencváros won the 1962–63 season of the Hungarian League. Therefore, Ferencváros entered the 1963–64 European Cup season. On 11 September 1963, Ferencváros lost to Galatasaray 4–0 at the BJK İnönü Stadium in Istanbul, Turkey. On 12 October 1963, the second leg was won by Ferencváros 2–0 but the Turkish club qualified for the next round on 4–2 aggregate.

Ferencváros won the 1964 season of the Hungarian League.

Ferencváros entered the 1964–65 Inter-Cities Fairs Cup. Ferencváros beat Spartak Brno 2–0 at home and lost to 1–0 away. In the second round Ferencváros lost 1–0 to Wiener Sport-Club in Wien, Austria, but won their home match 2–1. In the play-off match Ferencváros won 2–0 in Budapest and qualified for the next round. In the third round, Ferencváros beat Roma 2–1 at the Stadio Olimpico, Rome, Italy. The home match was also won by Ferencváros by beating AS Roma 1–0. In the quarter-finals, Ferencváros beat Athletic Bilbao 1–0 at home. However, Ferencváros lost 2–1 to Athletic in Bilbao, Spain. The play-off match was won by Ferencváros 3–0 in Budapest. In the semi-finals, Ferencváros lost 3–2 to Manchester United at the Old Trafford, Manchester, England. The home match was won by Ferencváros 1–0. The play-off match was also won by Ferencváros by 2–1 in Budapest. The 1965 Inter-Cities Fairs Cup Final was played on 23 June 1965 in Turin at the Stadio Comunale di Torino in front of the home crowd of Juventus, 40,000 spectators. The only goal of the match was scored in the 74th minute by Máté Fenyvesi and Ferencváros won the Inter-Cities Fairs Cup.

23 June 1965

Juventus (Italy)	0–1	(Hungary) Ferencváros
		Fenyvesi 74'

Stadio Comunale, Turin
Attendance: 30,000
Referee: Gottfried Dienst (Switzerland)

Ferencváros entered 1965–66 European Cup. In the preliminary round, Ferencváros beat Keflavík 4–1 in Reykjavík, Iceland on 29 August 1965. The second leg was won by Ferencváros 9–1 at the Népstadion on 8 September 1965. In the first round, Ferencváros drew (0–0) with Panathinaikos at the Népstadion on 10 November 1965. The second leg was won by Ferencváros 3–1 at the Leoforos Alexandras Stadium in Athens, Greece on 17 November 1965. In the quarter-finals, on 13 February 1966 Ferencváros lost 4–0 to FC Internazionale at the Stadio Giuseppe Meazza, in Milan, Italy. The second leg was a 1–1 draw at the Népstadion on 2 March 1966.

Ferencváros participated in the 1966–67 Inter-Cities Fairs Cup season. Ferencváros drew (3–3) with NK Olimpija Ljubljana in Ljubljana, Yugoslavia, while Ferencváros won their home match 3–0 in Budapest. In the second round, Ferencváros drew with Örgryte IS (0–0) in Örgryte, Sweden, but Ferencváros could win their home match 7–1. In the third round, Ferencváros lost 4–1 to Eintracht Frankfurt in Frankfurt, West Germany, but Ferencváros could win their home match 2–1 in Budapest. However, Ferencváros were eliminated from the Inter-Cities Fairs Cup.

Ferencváros won the 1967 season of the Hungarian League.

Flórián Albert was named European Footballer of the Year in 1967. He is the most successful Ferencváros since the formation of the club, scoring 255 goals in 351 matches from 1958 to 1974.

In the 1967–68 Inter-Cities Fairs Cup, Ferencváros lost 3–1 to FC Argeș in Pitești, Romania. However, Ferencváros won their home match by 4–0 and advanced to the next round. In the second round, Ferencváros lost 2–1 to Real Zaragoza in Zaragoza, Spain. At home, Ferencváros won the tie 3–0. In the third round, Ferencváros beat Liverpool 1–0 at home, and repeated the same scoreline at Anfield in England. In the quarter-finals, Ferencváros beat Athletic Bilbao 2–1 at home and again achieved the same result away to qualify for the next round on 4–2 aggregate. In the semi-finals, Ferencváros beat Bologna 3–2 at home and drew (2–2) in Bologna, Italy. In the first leg of the final, Ferencváros lost 1–0 to Leeds United at Elland Road, and drew 0–0 in the second match at the Népstadion in front of 76,000 spectators, which meant that Ferencváros failed to claim their second Inter-Cities Fairs Cup title.

Ferencváros won the 1968 season of the Hungarian League. Therefore, Ferencváros could have entered the 1968–69 European Cup season, but the club withdrew in protest to a redraw by UEFA of the first round keeping clubs from Eastern Europe and Western Europe separate, after western countries had threatened a boycott due to the Soviet invasion of Czechoslovakia.

Ferencváros entered the 1969–70 European Cup season. In the first round, Ferencváros lost 2–1 to CSKA Sofia in Sofia, Bulgaria on 17 September 1969. The home match was won by Ferencváros 4–1 on 1 October 1969. In the second round, Ferencváros lost 3–0 to Leeds United at Elland Road in Leeds, England on 12 November 1969. At home, Ferencváros were also beaten 3–0 on 26 November 1969 which resulted the farewell of the club from the European Cup.

== 1970s ==
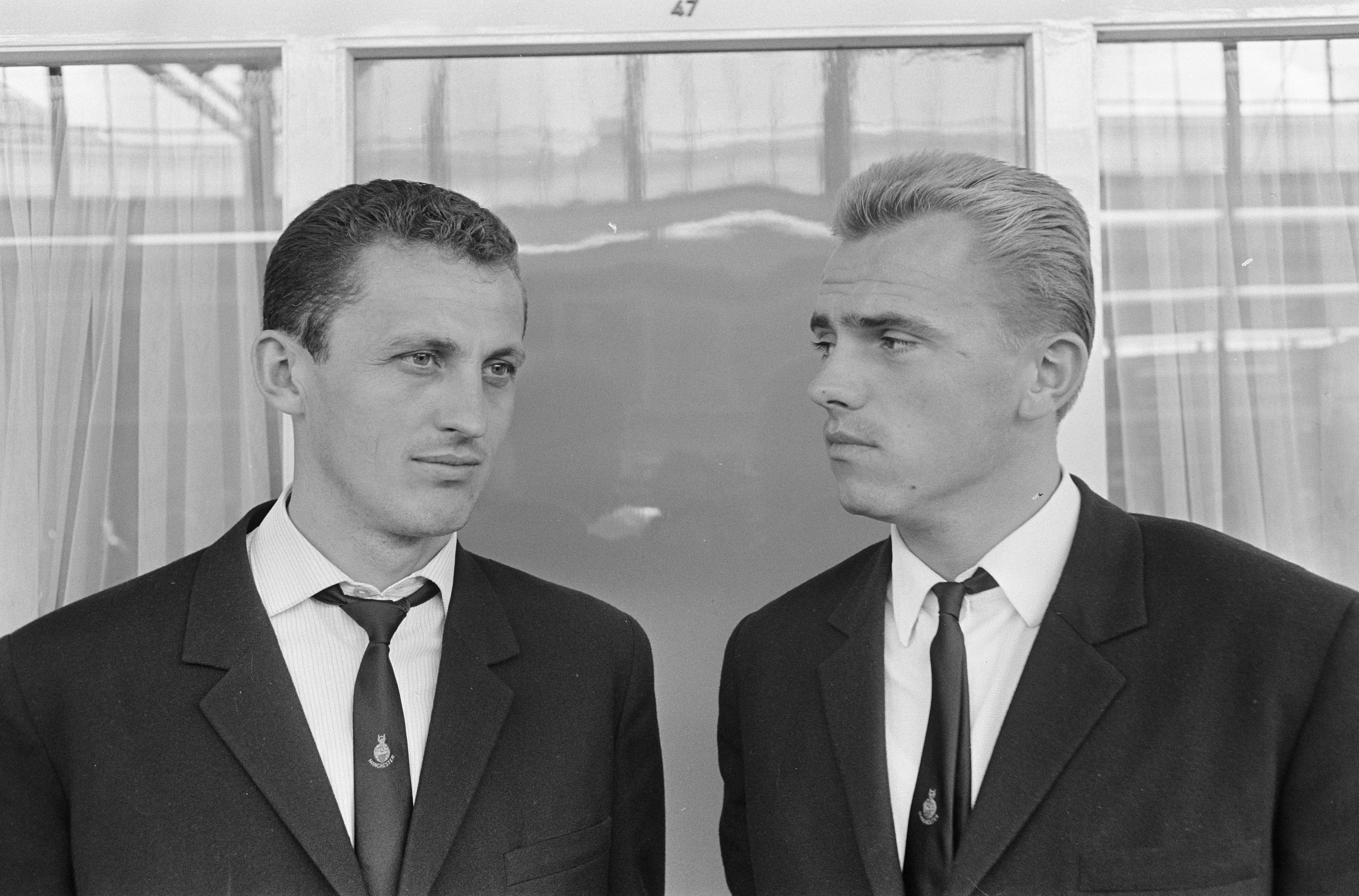
Ferencváros legend Albert with Vasas legend Mészöly in the 1970s

In the 1970s, Ferencváros won the Hungarian League only once, in 1976, but were more successful in the Hungarian Cup, which they won four times (1972, 1974, 1976, and 1978).

Ferencváros entered the 1970–71 Inter-Cities Fairs Cup. In the first round, Ferencváros lost 1–0 to Liverpool in Liverpool, England. At home, Ferencváros drew (1–1) with Liverpool which resulted their farewell from the Inter-Cities Fairs Cup.

Ferencváros participated in the first edition of the UEFA Cup, the 1971–72 UEFA Cup. In the first round, Ferencváros drew (1–1) with Fenerbahçe at the Şükrü Saracoğlu Stadium, in Istanbul, Turkey on 14 September 1971. At home, Ferencváros beat Fenerbahçe 3–1 on 29 September 1971. In the second round, on 20 October 1971 Ferencváros beat Panionios 6–0 at home. The return match was cancelled, scheduled 4 November 1971. In the third round, Ferencváros drew with Eintracht Braunschweig in Braunschweig, West Germany on 24 November 1971. At home, Ferencváros won the return match by 5–2 on 8 December 1971. On 9 March 1972, Ferencváros lost 2–1 to Željezničar at home. 3–3 On 22 March 1972, Ferencváros won 2–1 in Sarajevo, Yugoslavia. On penalty shoot-out Ferencváros won 5–4. In the semi-finals, Ferencváros drew (2–2) with Wolverhampton Wanderers F.C. at home, and lost 2–1 in Wolverhampton, England.

Ferencváros entered the 1972–73 UEFA Cup Winners' Cup season. In the first round, Ferencváros lost Floriana 0–1, in Malta. On the return match Ferencváros won 6–0 and qualified for the next round. In the second round, Ferencváros beat Sparta Prague 2–0 at home, but Ferencváros lost 4–1 on the return match and were eliminated from the UEFA Cup Winners' Cup.

Ferencváros entered the 1973–74 UEFA Cup. On 19 September 1973, Ferencváros lost 1–0 to Gwardia Warszawa at home. On 3 October 1973, Ferencváros were beaten 2–1 in Warsaw, Poland.

Ferencváros participated in the 1974–75 UEFA Cup Winners' Cup season. In the first round, Ferencváros beat Cardiff City 2–0 at home. The return match was won by Ferencváros 4–1 in Cardiff, Wales. In the second round, Ferencváros drew (1–1) with Liverpool at Anfield, in Liverpool, England. On the return match, the result was a goalless draw which resulted the qualification of Ferencváros for the next round. In the quarter-finals, Ferencváros beat Malmö FF 3–1 in Malmö, Sweden. On the return match, Ferencváros drew with Malmö (1–1). In the semi-finals, Ferencváros beat Red Star Belgrade 2–1 at home. On the return match, Ferencváros drew with Red Star Belgrade (2–2) in Belgrade, Yugoslavia. In the final, Ferencváros lost 3–0 to Dynamo Kyiv.

14 May 1975

Dynamo Kyiv (Soviet Union)	3–0	(Hungary) Ferencváros
Onyshchenko 18', 39'; Blokhin 67'	Report Report 2

St. Jakob Stadium, Basel
Attendance: 13,000

Ferencváros won the 1975–76 season of the Hungarian League. Therefore, Ferencváros could enter the 1976–77 European Cup. Ferencváros beat Jeunesse Esch 5–1 at home on 15 September 1976. On 29 September 1976, Ferencváros also won the return match by 6–2. In the second round, Ferencváros beat Dynamo Dresden 1–0 at home on 20 October 1976. However, on 3 November 1976, Ferencváros were beaten by Dresden 4–0 in Dresden, East Germany which resulted the farewell for the club.

Ferencváros entered the 1977–78 UEFA Cup. On 17 September 1977, Ferencváros were beaten 3–0 by Marek Dupnitsa at the Bonchuk Stadium in Dupnitsa, Bulgaria. On the return match, on 28 September 1977, Ferencváros won 2–0 but failed to qualify for the next round.

Ferencváros entered the 1978–79 UEFA Cup Winners' Cup season. In the first round Ferencváros beat Kalmar FF 2–0 at home. On the return match, Ferencváros drew with Kalmar (2–2) and qualified for the next round. In the second round, Ferencváros lost the first leg of the tie against 1. FC Magdeburg by 1–0 in Magdeburg, East Germany. At home, Ferencváros won 2–1 but the East German team won on away goals.

Ferencváros participated in the 1979–80 UEFA Cup. On 18 September 1979, Ferencváros were beaten 3–0 by Lokomotiv Sofia at the Lokomotiv Stadium, in Sofia, Bulgaria. On 3 October 1979, Ferencváros won 2–0 but they were unable to qualify for the next round.

On 17 March 1974, Flórián Albert played his last match, finishing it off with a goal.

== 1980s ==
Ferencváros won the 1980–81 season of the Hungarian League. As a consequence, Ferencváros entered the 1981–82 European Cup season. In the first round Ferencváros beat Baník Ostrava 3–2 at home on 16 September 1981. However, Ferencváros lost 3–0 in Bazaly Stadium in Ostrava, Czechoslovakia on 30 September 1981.

Ferencváros entered the 1982–83 UEFA Cup. In the first round, Ferencváros beat Athletic Bilbao 2–1 at home. On the return match, Ferencváros drew (1–1) with Athletic in Bilbao, Spain. In the second round, Ferencváros drew with FC Zürich (1–1) at home. On the return match, Ferencváros lost to 1–0 in Zürich, Switzerland and they were eliminated from the UEFA Cup.

Ferencváros participated in the 1983–84 UEFA Cup. On 14 September, Ferencváros lost 4–2 to PSV Eindhoven in Eindhoven, Netherlands. On 28 September 1983, Ferencváros were beaten 2–0 at home by PSV Eindhoven and were eliminated from the UEFA Cup.

Ferencváros entered the 1989–90 UEFA Cup Winners' Cup season. In the first round, Ferencváros beat Haka 5–1 at home. On the return match, the final result was a 1–1 draw. In the second round, Ferencváros lost 1–0 to VfB Admira Wacker Mödling in Mödling, Austria. At home Ferencváros were also beaten by Admira Wacker 1–0.

Tibor Nyilasi was awarded the Silver Shoes by scoring 30 goals in one season.

== 1990s ==

The 1995–96 UEFA Champions League lineup that qualified for the group stages against Anderlecht 1–1 at home.

In the 1990s, Ferencváros won the Hungarian League three times, in 1992, 1995, and 1996. As far as the Hungarian Cup is concerned, Ferencváros won four titles in 1991, 1993, 1994, 1995.

Ferencváros entered the 1990–91 UEFA Cup season.

Ferencváros won the 1990–91 Magyar Kupa. Therefore, Ferencváros entered the 1991–92 UEFA Cup Winners' Cup season. In the first round, Ferencváros beat Levski Sofia 3–2 in Sofia, Bulgaria. At home, Ferencváros beat 4–1 Levski Sofia and qualified for the next round. In the second round, Ferencváros lost 3–2 to Werder Bremen, in Bremen, Germany. At home, Ferencváros lost 1–0 and they were eliminated from the UEFA Cup Winners' Cup.

Ferencváros won the 1992–93 Magyar Kupa. Consequently, Ferencváros were eligible for entering the 1993–94 European Cup Winners' Cup. In the first round, Ferencváros were beaten 3–0 by Wacker Innsbruck in Innsbruck, Austria. On the return match, Wacker defeated Ferencváros 2–1 in Budapest.

Ferencváros won the 1993–94 Magyar Kupa, qualifying the club for the 1994–95 UEFA Cup Winners' Cup. In the preliminary round, Ferencváros defeated F91 Dudelange 6–1 at home, while in the return match, Ferencváros scored another six goals to again win 6–1 in Dudelange, Luxembourg. In the first round, Ferencváros lost 2–1 to CSKA Moscow in Moscow, and at home, Ferencváros defeated CSKA 2–1, then won the ensuing penalty shoot-out 7–6. In the second round, Ferencváros lost 6–0 to Porto away at Porto. However, the return match was won by Ferencváros 2–0 at home.

=== Novák era (1994–1996) ===
On 1 July 1994, Dezső Novák was appointed as the coach for the third time.

Ferencváros won the 1994–95 season of the Hungarian League. Therefore, Ferencváros were eligible for entering the 1995–96 UEFA Champions League. On 9 August 1995, Ferencváros defeated Anderlecht 1–0 in Brussels in the qualifying round. In the return match, on 23 August, Ferencváros drew 1–1 which resulted in qualification to the tournament group stage. On 13 September 1995, Ferencváros defeated Grasshopper 3–0 in Stadion Hardturm, Zürich. On the second matchday, Ferencváros were beaten by Ajax 5–1 at home. On 18 October, Ferencváros were beaten 6–1 at the Santiago Bernabéu Stadium by Real Madrid. On 1 November, Ferencváros drew with Real Madrid at home. On the fifth matchday, Ferencváros drew with Grasshopper 3–3 at home. On the final matchday, Ferencváros were beaten 4–0 at the Olympisch Stadion by Ajax in Amsterdam.

Pos	Team	Pld	W	D	L	GF	GA	GD	Pts	Qualification	AJX	RMA	FER	GRA
1	(Netherlands) Ajax	6	5	1	0	15	1	+14	16	Advance to knockout stage	—	1–0	4–0	3–0
2	(Spain) Real Madrid	6	3	1	2	11	5	+6	10	Advance to knockout stage	0–2	—	6–1	2–0
3	(Hungary) Ferencváros	6	1	2	3	9	19	−10	5		1–5	1–1	—	3–3
4	(Switzerland) Grasshopper	6	0	2	4	3	13	−10	2		0–0	0–2	0–3	—

Source: UEFA

Ferencváros won the 1995–96 season of the Hungarian League. As a consequence, Ferencváros entered the UEFA Champions League 1996–97 season. On 7 August 1996, Ferencváros lost 3–0 to IFK Göteborg in Gothenburg, Sweden. On 21 August 1996, Ferencváros drew with IFK Göteborg and they were eliminated from the UEFA Champions League.

=== Varga era (1996–1997) ===
Former Ferencváros legend Zoltán Varga was appointed as the manager in 1996.

Ferencváros entered the 1996–97 UEFA Cup. Ferencváros beat Olympiacos 3–1 at home in the first round on 10 September 1996 Ferencváros beat Olympiacos 3–0 in Pireus, Greece on 24 September 1996. On 15 October 1996, Ferencváros beat Newcastle United 3–2 at home, but on the return match Newcastle beat Ferencváros 4–0 at the St James' Park on 29 October 1996.

Ferencváros entered the 1997–98 UEFA Cup. In the first qualifying round, Ferencváros beat Bohemian 1–0 in Dublin, Ireland. On the return match, Ferencváros won 5–0 on 29 July 1997. In the second qualifying round, Ferencváros beat Helsingborgs IF 1–0 in Helsingborg, Sweden on 12 August 1997. On the return match, Ferencváros lost 1–0 to Helsingborg, but won on penalty shoot-out 4–3. In the first round, Ferencváros lost 3–0 to OFI in Heraklion, Greece. On the return match, Ferencváros won 2–1 but they were unable to qualify for the next round.

Ferencváros participated in the 1998–99 UEFA Cup. Ferencváros beat CE Principat 6–0 at home on 22 July 1998. On the return match, Ferencváros won 8–1 at the DEVK-Arena in Andorra la Vella, Andorra. In the second qualifying round, Ferencváros beat AEK Athens 4–2 at home. However, on 25 August 1998 Ferencváros were beaten 4–0 in Athens, Greece.

Ferencváros entered the 1999–2000 UEFA Cup. In the qualifying round, Ferencváros beat FC Tiraspol 3–1 at home. On 26 August 1999, Ferencváros drew with Tiraspol (1–1) in Chișinău, Moldavia. In the first round, Ferencváros lost 3–1 to FK Teplice in Teplice, Czech Republic. On the return match, Ferencváros drew (1–1) with Teplice at home on 30 September 1999.

== 2000s ==
Csank-led Ferencváros won the 2000–01 season of the Hungarian League. As a consequence, Ferencváros were eligible for entering the 2001-02 UEFA Champions League. On 25 July 2001, Ferencváros drew (0–0) with Hajduk Split at home. On 1 August 2001, Ferencváros drew (0–0) with Hajduk Split at the Stadion Poljud in Split, Croatia. Ferencváros lost on penalty shoot-out (5–4) and they were eliminated from the UEFA Champions League.

In 2003, Ferencváros were listed on the Budapest Stock Exchange, the first Hungarian club to become a public limited company.

=== Pintér era (2003–2004) ===
On 23 December 2003, Attila Pintér was appointed as the manager of the club.

Pintér-lead Ferencváros to win the 2002–03 season. Therefore, Ferencváros could enter the 2004-05 UEFA Champions League season. On 27 July 2004, Ferencváros beat KF Tirana 3–2 in Tirana, Albania. On the return match, on 4 August 2004, Ferencváros lost 1–0 to Tirana, but qualified for the next round on away goals rule. In the third-qualifying round Ferencváros beat Sparta Prague 1–0 at home on 11 August 2004. On 25 August 2004, Ferencváros lost 1–0 at the Stadion Letná, Prague, Czech Republic. After extra time Sparta Prague scored one goal and eliminated Ferencváros from the UEFA Champions League. However, Ferencváros were eligible for entering the first round of the 2004-05 UEFA Cup. On 16 September 2004, Ferencváros drew with Millwall (1–1) at The Den, South Bermondsey, London. On 30 September 2004, Ferencváros beat Millwall 3–1 at home and qualified for the 2004-05 UEFA Cup group stage. On 4 November 2004, Ferencváros drew with Feyenoord (1–1) at home. On 25 November 2004, Ferencváros lost 2–0 to Schalke 04 at the Veltins-Arena, Gelsenkirchen, Germany. On 1 December 2004, Ferencváros lost 2–1 to FC Basel at home. On 15 December 2004, Ferencváros defeated Hearts 1–0 at the Tynecastle Stadium, Edinburgh, Scotland.

On 16 November 2004, Ferencváros launched a wide-ranging anti-racism campaign in order to eliminate intolerance and discrimination in football. Four club players, including half Nigerian/half Hungarian Sowunmi and half Brazilian/half-Hungarian Leandro, Lipcsei, Rósa and head coach, Csaba László, featured on a campaign poster carrying the slogan Silence Racism. The club asked their supporters to show the poster in the second minute of the 2004-05 UEFA Cup group stage match against Feyenoord on 4 November 2004. After the match, Feyenoord coach Gullit said: "it was a great idea by Ferencváros".

In the 2004–05 season of the Hungarian League, Ferencváros finished second and therefore qualified for the 2005-06 UEFA Cup. On 14 July 2005, Ferencváros lost 0–2 to Partizan Minsk at home. On 28 July 2005, Ferencváros beat Partizan Minsk 2–1 in Minsk, Belarus, but Ferencváros were eliminated from the UEFA Cup.

In the 2005–06 season, Ferencváros finished sixth in the Hungarian League. However, in July 2006, the club was relegated from the Hungarian League to the Hungarian League 2 as a punishment for continued financial difficulties. The club challenged the legality of this move in court. Ferencváros won the case as the verdict declared that the move of the Hungarian Football Federation was against the law. An out-of-court agreement between the club and the Hungarian Football Federation was reached.

In the season 2006–07 of the Hungarian League 2, Nyiregyhaza Spartacus beat Ferencváros to promotion in a tight contest, ensuring that Ferencváros stayed in the second division. Despite investments in players, including former Ferencváros stars, the season 2007–08 brought further trouble. This time Kecskemét and Szolnok both outran Ferencváros in the Eastern Group of the Hungarian League 2 title race. In 2009, Craig Short was nominated as the new manager of the club. In the 2008–09 season, however, Ferencváros finally secured its return to the Hungarian League on 22 May 2009.

== 2010s ==
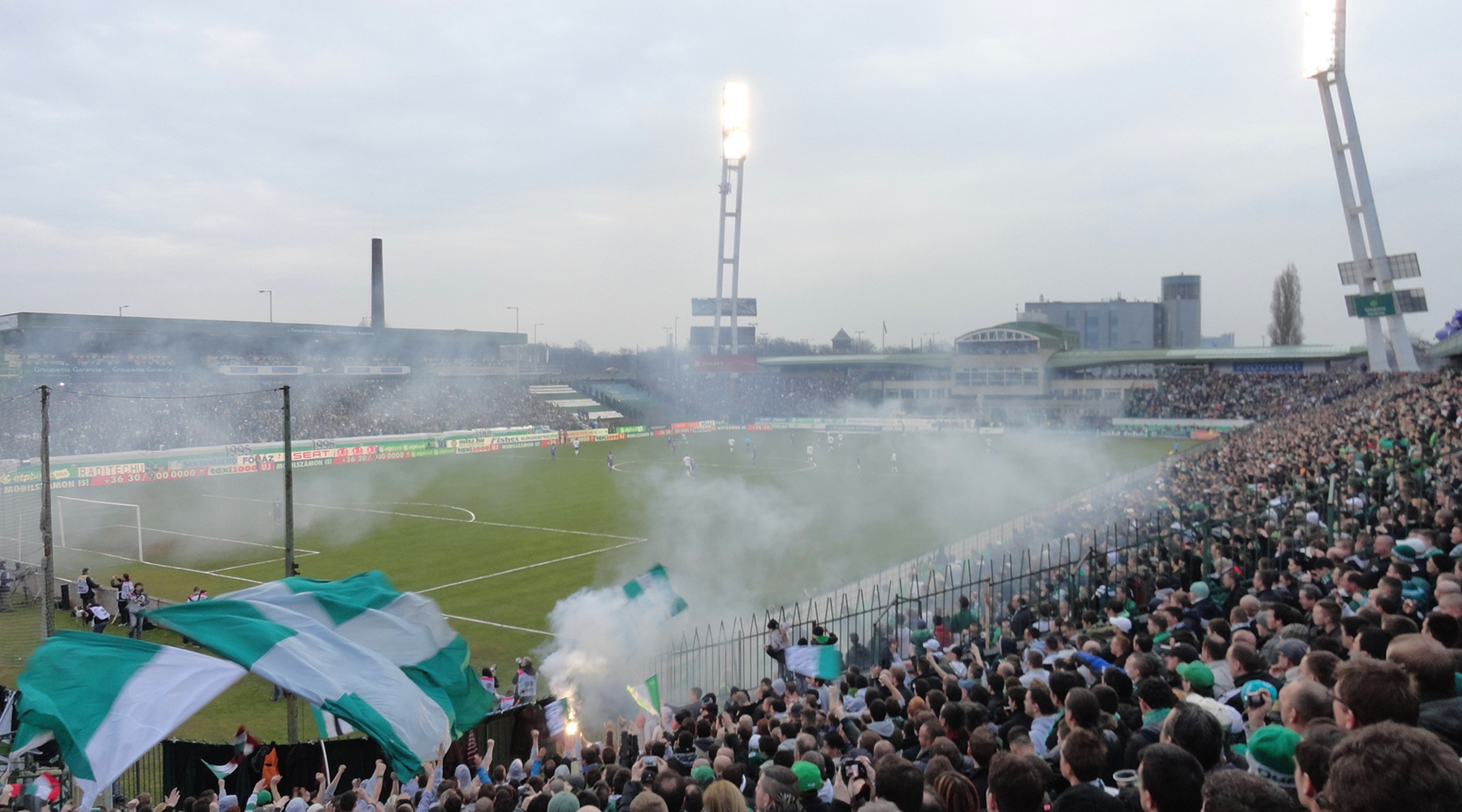
Ferencvárosi TC–Újpest FC match on 10 March 2013 in the 2012–13 Nemzeti Bajnokság I season

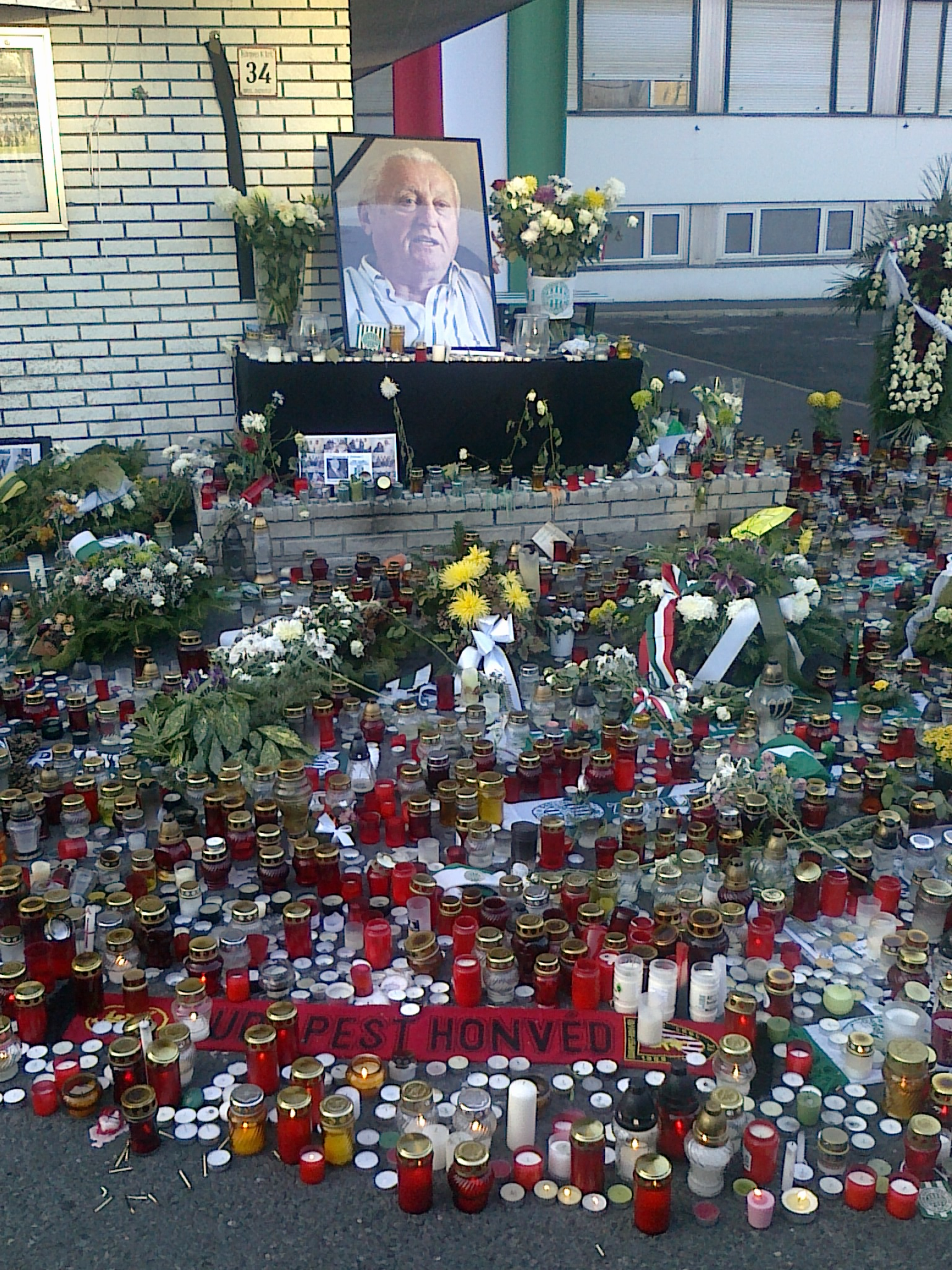
Farewell from Flórián Albert in front of the stadium named after him

In the 2010–11 season of the Hungarian League, Ferencváros finished third. As a consequence, Ferencváros entered the 2011–12 UEFA Europa League season. On 30 June 2011, Ferencváros beat 2010 Armenian Premier League third Ulisses 3–0 at home in the first qualifying round. On 7 July 2011, Ferencváros beat Ulisses 2–0 at the Hrazdan Stadium, Yerevan, Armenia. On 14 July, Ferencváros beat 2010 Tippeligaen fourth Aalesunds FK 2–1 at home. On 21 July 2011, Ferencváros lost 2–1 to Aalesund in Norway. Aalesund won 3–1 after extra time and eliminated Ferencváros from the UEFA Europa League.

On 31 October 2011, club legend Flórián Albert died at the age of 70 after complications following heart surgery.

=== Doll era (2013–2018) ===
On 18 December 2013, Thomas Doll was appointed as the manager of the club.

Ferencváros finished third in the 2013–14 season. Therefore, Ferencváros entered the 2014–15 UEFA Europa League season. In the first leg of the first qualifying round, the 2013–14 Maltese FA Trophy runner-up Sliema Wanderers F.C. drew with Ferencváros (1–1) at the Ta Quali Stadium in Ta'Qali on Malta on 1 July 2014. In the second leg, Ferencváros beat Sliema Wanderers F.C. 2–1 at the Puskás Ferenc Stadion on 10 July 2014. On 17 July 2014, the 2013–14 Croatian First Football League runner-up HNK Rijeka beat Ferencváros 1–0 at the Stadion Kantrida in Rijeka, Croatia in the first leg of the second qualifying round. On the return match, Ferencváros were also beaten by HNK Rijeka (2–1) at the Puskás Ferenc Stadion on 24 July 2014. The Croatian club eliminated Ferencváros from the 2014–15 UEFA Europa League on 3–1 aggregate.

On 20 May 2015, Ferencváros beat Videoton 4–0 at the Groupama Aréna in the 2014–15 Magyar Kupa Final.

In the 2014–15 season of the Hungarian League, Ferencváros finished second and qualified for the first qualifying round of the 2015–16 UEFA Europa League season.

On 2 April 2016, Ferencváros won their 29th Hungarian League title after losing to Debreceni VSC 2–1 at the Nagyerdei Stadion in the 2015–16 Nemzeti Bajnokság I season.

In the 2016–17 Nemzeti Bajnokság I, Ferencváros finished fourth and they were preceded by champions Budapest Honvéd, Videoton FC and Vasas SC. Nevertheless, Ferencváros won the 2017 Magyar Kupa Final against Vasas SC at the Groupama Aréna on 31 May 2017. The match ended with a 1–1 draw but Ferencváros won on penalty shoot-out. As a consequence, Ferencváros were eligible to enter the 2017–18 UEFA Europa League. In the first round, Ferencváros beat 2016 Latvian Higher League runner-up FK Jelgava at the Groupama Aréna on 29 June 2017. The goals were scored by Varga in the 11th and 69th minutes. In the second leg of the first round, Ferencváros managed to beat Jelgava 1–0 at the Zemgale Olympic Center, Jelgava, Latvia. The only goal of the match was scored by Priskin in the 37th minute. Ferencváros won 3–0 on aggregate and qualified for the second round.

=== Rebrov era (2018–2021) ===
On 22 August 2018, Serhiy Rebrov was appointed as the manager of the club.

Ferencváros won their 30th Nemzeti Bajnokság I title by winning the 2018–19 Nemzeti Bajnokság I season. Therefore, they were eligible to enter the 2019–20 UEFA Champions League qualifiers. In the first round of the 2019–20 UEFA Champions League qualifiers Ferencváros beat PFC Ludogorets Razgrad 2–1 at the Groupama Arena on 10 July 2019. In the second leg, Ferencváros also could beat the Bulgarian champions by 3–2 at the Ludogorets Arena on 17 July 2019.

== 2020s ==
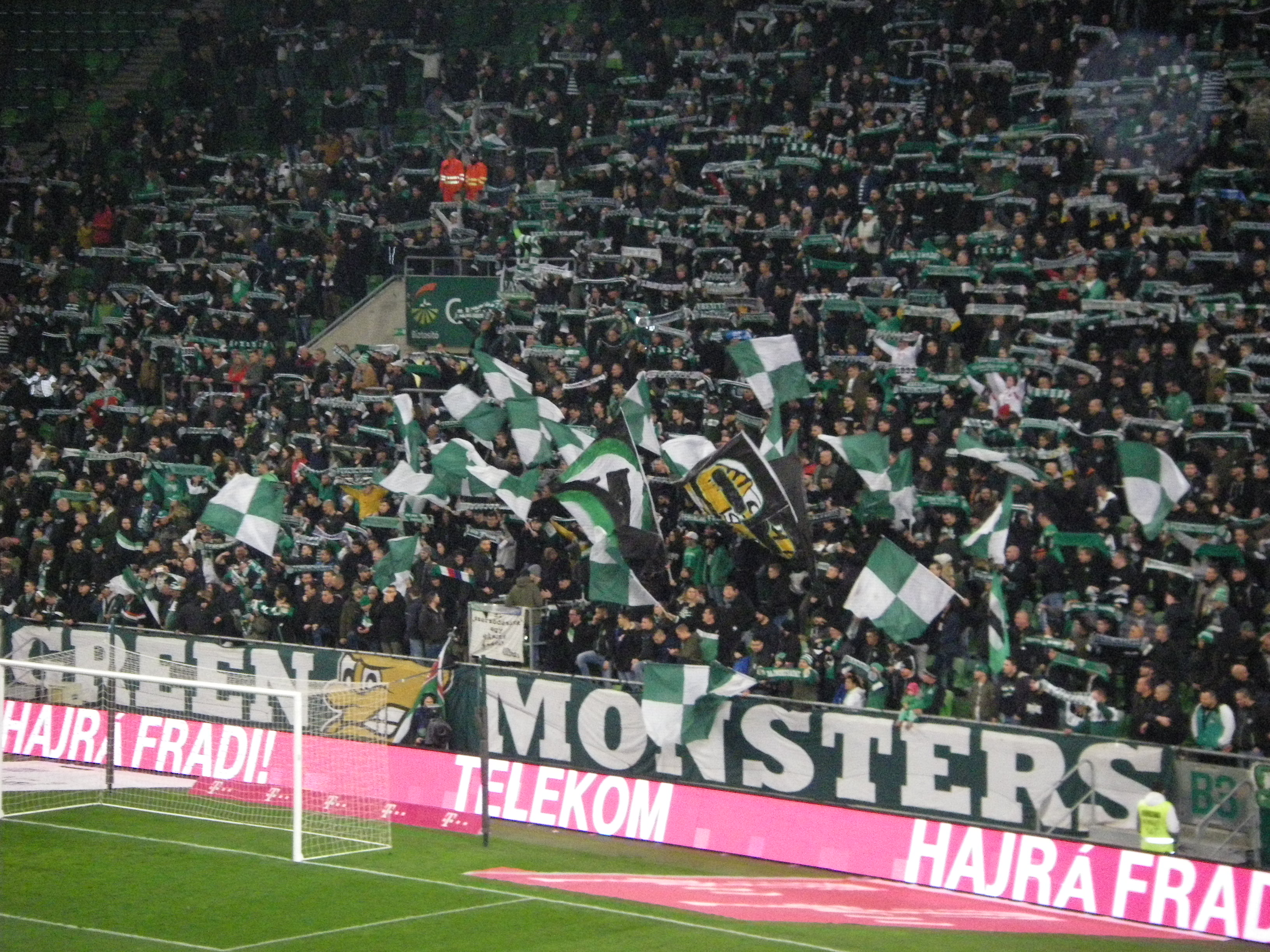
Green monster fans

On 16 June 2020, Ferencváros secured their 31st trophy by beating Budapest Honvéd FC at the Hidegkuti Nándor Stadion on the 30th matchday of the 2019–20 Nemzeti Bajnokság I season.

The 2020-21 UEFA Champions League qualifying phase and play-off round lineup that qualified for the group stage against Molde FK at home.

In the first round of the 2020–21 UEFA Champions League, Ferencváros beat 2–0, both goals scored by South Sudanese Tokmac Nguen, 2019 Allsvenskan-winner Djurgårdens IF Fotboll at Groupama Aréna on 19 August 2020. Due to the COVID-19 pandemic, only one leg was played. Ferencvaros then humbled Celtic by winning 2–1 away from home. They went on to beat Molde 3–3 on away goals to advance to their first UEFA Champions League since 1995–96. In the group stage Ferencváros was drawn into Group G along with FC Barcelona, Juventus FC and Dynamo Kyiv. On 20 October 2020, Barcelona hosted Ferencváros and the Catalan giant beat the Hungarian team 5-1. The only Hungarian goal was scored by Ihor Kharatin in the 70th minute at the Camp Nou in Barcelona. There was no attendance due to the restrictions of the pandemic. On 28 October 2020, Ferencváros hosted Dynamo Kyiv at the Groupama Arena. The referee of the match was Ivan Kružliak and the match ended with a 2-2 draw. Tokmac Nguen and Franck Boli scored the two Hungarian goals. The attendance was 6,171 due to the restrictions. On 4 November 2020 Ferencváros hosted Juventus FC at the newly-built Puskás Aréna. The match ended with a 4-1 victory for the Italian club. The only Hungarian goal was scored by Franck Boli. On 24 November 2020, Ferencváros was hosted by Juventus FC at the Juventus Stadium. The match ended with a 2-1 victory for the Italian club. The winning goal came in the 90+2nd minute by Álvaro Morata. The only Hungarian goal was scored by Myrto Uzuni. On 2 December 2020, Ferencváros hosted F.C. Barcelona at the Puskás Aréna. The match ended with a 3-0 victory for the Catalan club. The referee of the match was Aleksei Kulbakov from the Belarus. On 8 December 2020, Dynamo Kyiv hosted Ferencváros at the Olympiyskiy National Sports Complex in Kyiv. The match ended with a 1-0 defeat for the Hungarian club which meant their farewell from the European cups.

Pos	Team	Pld	W	D	L	GF	GA	GD	Pts	Qualification	JUV	BAR	DKV	FER
1	(Italy) Juventus	6	5	0	1	14	4	+10	15 (Note: Tied on head-to-head points (3). Head-to-head goal difference: Juventus +1, Barcelona –1.)	Advance to knockout phase	—	0–2	3–0	2–1
2	(Spain) Barcelona	6	5	0	1	16	5	+11	15	Advance to knockout phase	0–3	—	2–1	5–1
3	(Ukraine) Dynamo Kyiv	6	1	1	4	4	13	−9	4	Transfer to Europa League	0–2	0–4	—	1–0
4	(Hungary) Ferencváros	6	0	1	5	5	17	−12	1		1–4	0–3	2–2	—

Source: UEFA
Notes:

On 20 April 2021, Ferencváros won the 2020-21 Nemzeti Bajnokság I season by beating archrival Újpest FC 3–0 at the Groupama Arena. The goals were scored by Myrto Uzuni (3rd and 77th minute) and Tokmac Nguen (30th minute).

On 4 June 2021, Serhii Rebrov officially resigned. Four key players, Lovrencsics, Isael, Heister, and Škvarka were sold in the summer of 2021.

=== Stöger era (2021) ===
On 5 June 2021, Peter Stöger was appointed as the new coach of the club. Stöger previously managed FK Austria Wien, 1. FC Köln, and Borussia Dortmund.

Stöger debuted in the first round of the 2020–21 UEFA Champions League qualifying phase against FC Prishtina at the Groupama Aréna on 6 July 2021. The match was won by Ferencváros 3–0. In the second leg, Ferencváros beat Prishtina 3–1 at the Fadil Vokrri Stadium, Pristina, Kosovo on 13 July 2021. In the second round, Ferencváros beat FK Žalgiris 2–0 at the Groupama Aréna on 20 July 2021. In the second leg, Ferencváros could also win (3–1) at the LFF Stadium in Vilnius, Lithuania on 27 July 2021. In the third round, Ferencváros beat SK Slavia Prague 2–0 at the Groupama Aréna on 4 August 2021. In the 44th minute, Taras Kacharaba scored an own goal, while Ihor Kharatin scored in the 50th minute. In the second leg, Ferencváros lost 1–0 at the Fortuna Arena in Prague, Czech Republic on 10 August 2021. Ferencváros won 2–1 on aggregate. In the play-off, Ferencváros was beaten by BSC Young Boys 3–2 at the Stadion Wankdorf in Bern, Switzerland on 18 August 2021. In the second leg, Ferencváros was also beaten by 3–2 by Young Boys resulting in the exit of Ferencváros from the UEFA Champions League. Consequently, Ferencváros entered the 2021-22 UEFA Europa League group stage. Ferencváros were drawn in Group G along with Bayer 04 Leverkusen, Real Betis, and Celtic F.C. Ferencváros lost their first five matches. However, they could beat Bayer 04 Leverkusen 1–0 at the Groupama Aréna on 9 December 2021.

On 13 December 2021, Peter Stöger was sacked.after losing 2–0 to Debreceni VSC at the Nagyerdei Stadion

=== Cherchesov era (2021–2023) ===
On 20 December 2021, Stanislav Cherchesov was appointed as the new manager of the club.

On 24 April 2022, Ferencváros beat Újpest FC in the 29th round of the 2021–22 Nemzeti Bajnokság I and won their 33rd title.

Ferencváros entered the first round of the 2022–23 UEFA Champions League qualifying phase. They drew (0-0) with FC Tobol at the Kostanay Central Stadium, Kostanay, Kazakhstan on 6 July 2022. In the second leg, Ferencváros beat 5–1 Tobol at the Groupama Aréna on 13 July 2022. In the second round, Ferencváros lost 2–1 to ŠK Slovan Bratislava at the Groupama Aréna on 20 July 2022. In the second leg, Ferencváros beat 4–1 the Slovak champion at the Tehelné pole, Bratislava, Slovakia on 27 July 2022. Franck Boli took the lead in the 20th minute. Furthermore, Kristoffer Zachariassen could score one more goal in the 31st minute (0–2). However, ŠK Slovan Bratislava could score a goal in the 70 minute (1–2), equalizing the result on aggregate (3–3). In the remaining half an hour, Ferencváros could continue to dominate the match and score a goal in the 89th minute by Adama Traoré and in the 95th minute by Aïssa Laïdouni. In the third round, Ferencváros faced with the Azeri champions, Qarabağ FK. On 3 August 2022, Ferencváros drew (1–1) with Qarabağ FK at the Tofiq Bahramov Republican Stadium, in Baku, Azerbaijan. However, in the second leg, on 9 August 2022, Ferencváros lost 3–1 to the Azeri champions at home. The farewell from the 2022–23 UEFA Champions League meant that the club could continue in the 2022–23 UEFA Europa League group stage. Ferencváros won their first group match (3–2) against Trabzonspor on 8 September 2022. On 15 September 2022, Ferencváros could beat 1–0 AS Monaco FC at the Stade Louis II in Monaco. On 6 October 2022, Ferecváros were defeated 4–1 by Red Star Belgrade at the Red Star Stadium. On 13 October 2022, Ferencváros took revenge and beat Red Star 2–1 at home. On 27 October 2022, Ferencvátos drew with Monaco at the Groupama Aréna. Although Ferencváros lost 1–0 to Trabzonspor on 3 November 2022 at the Şenol Güneş Sports Complex in Trabzon, Ferencváros finished first in the group and qualified for the knock-out stage.

Pos	Team	Pld	W	D	L	GF	GA	GD	Pts	Qualification
1	(Hungary) Ferencváros	6	3	1	2	8	9	−1	10 (Note: Head to head points: Ferencváros 4, Monaco 1.)	Advance to round of 16
2	(France) Monaco	6	3	1	2	9	8	+1	10	Advance to knockout round play-offs
3	(Turkey) Trabzonspor	6	3	0	3	11	9	+2	9	Transfer to Europa Conference League
4	(Serbia) Red Star Belgrade	6	2	0	4	9	11	−2	6	

Source: UEFA
Rules for classification: Group stage tiebreakers
Notes:

On 9 March 2023, Ferencváros were beaten 2–0 by Bayer 04 Leverkusen in the round of 16 of the 2022–23 UEFA Europa League knockout phase. On 16 March 2023, Ferencváros lost to Bayer at the Puskás Aréna in front of more than 50,000 spectators and were knocked out from the Europa League.

On 5 May 2023, Ferencváros won the 2022–23 Nemzeti Bajnokság I season, after Kecskemét lost 1–0 to Honvéd at the Bozsik Aréna. After winning the season, Pál Orosz said that it is quite unusual for a club to win the championship title for five consecutive seasons.

Ferencváros would then lose 3–0 on aggregate to Faroese side Klaksvíkar Ítróttarfelag, more commonly known as KÍ, in the 2023–24 UEFA Champions League first qualifying round, including a 3–0 loss at home in the second leg on 7 July 2023. After the match Stanislav Cherchesov was sacked. Csaba Máté was appointed as the interim manager. After the early farewell from the Champions League, Ferencváros could continue in the 2023–24 UEFA Europa Conference League. On 27 July 2023, Ferencváros beat Shamrock Rovers F.C. 4–0, while on 3 August Ferencváros won 2–0 at the Tallaght Stadium, in Tallaght. In the third qualifying round, Ferencváros beat Ħamrun Spartans F.C. 6–1 at the National Stadium, Ta' Qali, in Ta' Qali, Malta. In the second leg, Ferencváros also beat Hamrun 2–1 at home. In the play-off round, Ferencváros beat 4–0 FK Žalgiris at the LFF Stadium, in Vilnius on 24 August 2023. In the second leg, Ferencváros also won 3–0 at home on 31 August 2023. The draw of the 2023–24 UEFA Europa Conference League group stage was held on 1 September 2023 in Monaco, and Ferencváros were seeded in Pot 1. Ferencváros were drawn into Group F along with ACF Fiorentina, K.R.C. Genk, and FK Čukarički.

=== Stanković era (2023–2024) ===
Although Ferencváros played really well with their interim manager, Csaba Máté, former Inter Milan player, Dejan Stanković was appointed as the head coach on 4 September 2023.

Pos	Team	Pld	W	D	L	GF	GA	GD	Pts	Qualification
1	(Italy) Fiorentina	6	3	3	0	14	6	+8	12	Advance to round of 16
2	(Hungary) Ferencváros	6	2	4	0	9	6	+3	10	Advance to knockout round play-offs
3	(Belgium) Genk	6	2	3	1	8	5	+3	9	
4	(Serbia) Čukarički	6	0	0	6	2	16	−14	0	

Source: UEFA
Rules for classification: Group stage tiebreakers

The first group match was won by Ferencváros against FK Čukarički on 21 September 2023 at the Groupama Aréna. On 5 October 2023, Ferencváros drew (2–2) with ACF Fiorentina. Ferencváros were leading 2–0, and the Italian club could score the equalizer only in the added time at the Stadio Artemio Franchi, Florence, Italy. The third group match was played against K.R.C. Genk at the Cegeka Arena in Genk, Belgium on 26 October 2023. The match ended with a goalless draw. On 9 November 2023, Ferencváros drew with K.R.C. Genk (1–1) at the Groupama Aréna. On 30 November 2023, Ferencváros beat FK Čukarički at the Dubočica Stadium. Ferrncváros could win the match by a late goal by Aleksandar Pešić. Ferencváros needed one point against Fiorentina to advance to the knockout stage.On 14 December 2023, Ferencváros drew with Fiorentina at the Groupama Aréna (1–1). The only Hungarian goal was scored by Kristoffer Zachariassen.

Although Stanković's Ferencváros were successful in the UEFA matches, the club struggled in the Nemzeti Bajnokság I. Therefore, Paksi FC resided on the top of the 2023–24 Nemzeti Bajnokság I season in the winter break, followed by Ferencváros and Fehérvár FC.

In January 2024, the club decided to terminate the contract with three players Tokmac Nguen, Owusu Kwabena, and Anderson Esiti. The club also signed Kenan Kodro from Fehérvár FC. However, Tamás Hajnal also said that they would like to sign more forwards in the winter break.

On 20 April 2024, the Ferencváros–Kisvárda tie ended with a goalless draw at the Groupama Aréna on the 29th match day of the 2023–24 Nemzeti Bajnokság I season which meant that Ferencváros won their 35th championship.

On 16 May 2024, Stanković resigned and left the club for FC Spartak Moscow. On 19 May 2024, Ferencváros Újpest 2–0 and set a new record of 16 consecutive wins in the Ferencvárosi TC–Újpest FC rivalry.

=== Jansen era (2024) ===
On 13 June 2024, Pascal Jansen was appointed as the manager of the club. On 15 July 2024, Ferencváros played a pre-season friendly with 2023–24 Premier League club West Ham United F.C. in Kitzbühel, Austria. The match ended with a 2–2 draw. Jansen debuted with a 5–0 victory over The New Saints F.C. in the 2024–25 UEFA Champions League qualifying phase on 23 July 2024. On 30 July 2024, Ferencváros beat The New Saints 2–1 at the Park Hall . On 3 August 2024, Ferencváros started the 2024–25 Nemzeti Bajnokság I season with a 1–0 victory over Kecskeméti TE. On 3 September 2024, Ferencváros signed Matheus Saldanha, top scorer of the 2023–24 Serbian SuperLiga, from FK Partizan. In the third qualifying round, Ferencváros lost 2–0 to FC Midtjylland at the MCH Arena on 6 August 2024. The second leg, ended with a 1–1 draw in Budapest which meant the farewell from the Champions League of Ferencváros on 13 August 2024. Ferencváros could continue its European season in the 2024–25 UEFA Europa League play-off round. On 22 August 2024, Ferencváros drew with FK Borac Banja Luka in Budapest. The second leg also ended with a draw 1–1. The first goal was scored by Meijers in the 104th minute, while Varga could score the equalizer in the 111th minute. Ferencváros won the penalty shoot-out 3–2 since Herrera, Cavic, and Grahovac missed their penalties. Ferencváros qualified for the league phase of the Europa League.

In the 2024–25 UEFA Europa League league phase, Ferencváros played their first match against R.S.C. Anderlecht and lost to 2–1 on 25 September 2024. On 3 October 2024, Ferencváros lost 2–1 to Tottenham Hotspur F.C. in Budapest.

Ferencváros were fined by UEFA due to the behavior of the supporters during the 2024–25 UEFA Europa League match against Anderlecht. Ferencváros had to pay 24 million HUF and supporters are banned from one UEFA match.

In the third round of the League Phase of the Europa League, Ferencváros beat OGC Nice 1–0 at home. The only goal, an own goal, was scored by Moïse Bombito Lumpungu in the 15th minute. On 7 November 2024, Ferencváros were hosted by FC Dynamo Kyiv in Hamburg due to the Russo-Ukrainian War in the fourth round of the league phase. It was reported by Nemzeti Sport that former Ferencváros and Kyiv coach Serhiy Rebrov was also attending the match as the manager of Ukraine national football team. The match ended with a 4–0 victory for Ferencváros. The goals were scored by Varga, followed by Zachariassen and Saldanha. In an interview after the victory against Dynamo, Pascal said that it is a big thing to beat Dynamo 4–0 away. The other day, he Ukrainian press described the match as a "match to forget quickly".

=== Keane era (2025–present) ===
On 31 December 2024, Pascal Jansen resigned and left the club for New York City FC. On 6 January 2025, Robbie Keane was appointed as the manager of the club. Keane's assistant coaches included Phil Hudson and Rory Delap. On 23 January 2025, Keane debuted with a 2–0 defeat from Eintracht Frankfurt at the Waldstadion in the league phase of the Europa League. Keane's home debut ended with a 4–3 victory over AZ Alkmaar. Finally, Ferencváros finished in the 17th position in the league phase and qualified for the knock-out stage. On 2 February 2025, Keane's first league match ended with a goalless draw against MTK Budapest FC in the Örökrangadó. After a 2–2 draw against Zalaegerszegi TE at the ZTE Arena, Keane's Ferencváros suffered their first defeat in the Nemzeti Bajnokság I on 9 February 2025, when Ferencváros were defeated 1–0 by Puskás Akadémia FC at the Pancho Aréna. Kubatov met former Ferencváros manager, Cherchesov, at the Pancho Aréna. Puskás Akadémia also overtook Ferencváros on the table of the 2024–25 Nemzeti Bajnokság I season. Finally, Ferencváros won the season on the last game day by beating Győr 2-1 away. During the 2025 summer transfer window, Ferencváros sold Adama Traoré to Gençlerbirliği S.K., while Matheus Saldanha to Al Wasl F.C.. The purchases included Bence Ötvös from Paksi FC, Jonathan Levi from Puskás Akadémia, Callum O'Dowda from Cardiff City, Gabi Kanichowsky from Maccabi Tel Aviv, and Toon Raemaekers from Mechelen.

Ferencváros entered the second round of the 2025–26 UEFA Champions League qualifying. On 22 July 2025, Ferencváros beat FC Noah 2–1 at the Abovyan City Stadium, in Abovyan, Armenia. In the second leg, Ferencváros beat Noah 4–3 at home on 30 July 2025. In the third round, Ferencváros drew (0–0)with PFC Ludogorets Razgrad at the Huvepharma Arena, in Razgrad, Bulgaria on 6 August 2025. On 12 August 2025, Ferencváros beat Ludogorets 3–0 at the Groupama Aréna. The goals were score by Varga and Szalai. On 26 February 2026, Ferencváros beat PFC Ludogorets Razgrad 2-1 at home and qualified for the quarter finals of the Europa League. On 12 March 2026, Ferencváros beat S.C. Braga 2-0 at home in the first leg of the quarter-finals. However, Braga beat Ferencváros 4-0 in Portugal resulting in the farewell from the Europa League.

In the 2025–26 Nemzeti Bajnokság I season, Ferencváros finished in the second place. Before the last round, Győr was on the top of the league table, while Ferencváros was placed second. The difference was only one point. On the last match day, although Ferencváros beat Zalaegerszeg 3–0 at home, Ferencváros' rival Győr beat Kisvárda 1–0 at the Várkerti Stadion. These results meant that Győr became the champions.

On 9 May 2026, Ferencváros beat Zalaegerszeg 1–0 in the 2026 Magyar Kupa final. On 23 May 2026, Keane resigned. Keane won two trophies with the club: 2024–25 Nemzeti Bajnokság I and the 2025–26 Magyar Kupa.

=== Borbély era (2026–present) ===
On 29 May 2026, Balázs Borbély was appointed as the manager of the club. Borbély led Győr to win the 2025–26 Nemzeti Bajnokság I title the previous season. Borbély debuted with a 2–1 victory over FK Vojvodina in the first round of the 2026–27 UEFA Europa League qualifying at the Karađorđe Stadium in Novi Sad. In the second tie, Ferencváros beat Vojvodina 3–0 at the Groupama Aréna on 16 July 2026. In the second round, Ferencváros were hosted by fourth placed team of the 2025–26 Eredivisie, FC Twente at the De Grolsch Veste in Enschede, Netherlands. The match ended with a 2–1 away victory for Ferencváros thanks to two goals scored by Haitian international Lenny Joseph. After the match, Borbély said that he was satisfied with the result. The second tie ended with a 2–2 draw in Hungary. After Toon Raemaekers' penalty, Philippe Rommens was sent off. However, Lenny Joseph could extended the lead by two goals in the 50th minute. Twente could equalize the result thanks to Weghorst and Vennegoor of Hesselink in the 82nd and 86th minutes, respectively. In the third round, Ferencváros beat Górnik Zabrze at home. On 8 August 2026, Ferencváros hosted Real Madrid CF for a friendly tie. The match ended with a 2–1 victory for the Spanish giant, Real Madrid. After the match, Real Madrid's coach José Mourinho said that "First, I’d like to thank Ferencvaros for this very good training session. They have played five Europa League games, plus a couple more in their league, and you can see they have a high level of intensity in their play. I liked the first half more than the second. It doesn’t surprise me; the first half was played by a team we’ve been working with and that has played a couple of games before, so there is more connection between the players on the pitch. We had very good control of the game.” On 13 August 2026, Górnik Zabrze drew (1–1) with Ferencváros at the Arena Zabrze in Zabrze, Poland. Ferencváros advanced to the play-offs on 2–1 aggregate. On 20 August 2026, Ferencváros beat Trabzonspor with newly signed Mohamed Salah 1–0 at the Şenol Güneş Sports Complex in Trabzon. Kristoffer Zachariassen scored the only goal in the 17th minute. The second leg was won by Ferencváros 4–0 at their home stadium. O'Dowda scored the first goal in the 19th minute, followed by Corbu in the 54th minute, Dele in the 59th minute, and Lisztes in the 86th minute. Ferencváros qualified for the league phase. On the first match of the league phase, Ferencváros beat Celtic F.C. 3–1 at Celtic Park, Glasgow, Scotland on 17 September 2026. On 5 November 2026, Ferencváros beat AC Milan at the San Siro on the fourth match day of the league phase. Lenny Joseph scored twice.

== See also ==
- Ferencvárosi TC
