= 1929–30 Nemzeti Bajnokság II =

Nemzeti Bajnokság II
- Season: 1929–30
- Champions: Sabaria FC
- Promoted: Sabaria FC; Vasas FC

The 1929–30 Nemzeti Bajnokság II season was the 30th edition of the Nemzeti Bajnokság II.

== League table ==
Pos	Team	Pld	W	D	L	GF	GA	GD	Pts	Promotion
1	Sabaria FC (Note: Before 7 September 1929, its name was Sabaria Labdarúgók Szövetkezete.)	24	21	2	1	82	18	+64	44	Promotion to Nemzeti Bajnokság I
2	Vasas FC	24	17	5	2	71	23	+48	39	Promotion to Nemzeti Bajnokság I
3	VAC FC	24	16	3	5	50	19	+31	35	
4	Soroksár FC	24	11	7	6	51	36	+15	29	
5	BAK TK	24	13	2	9	35	31	+4	28	
6	Turul FC	24	10	6	8	61	36	+25	26	
7	Zala-Kanizsa FC (Note: Ceased to exist after the championship.)	24	10	4	10	38	38	0	24	
8	Megyer FC (Note: Before 31 August 1928, Erzsébetvárosi Sportkedvelők Köre.)	24	9	3	12	42	59	−17	21	
9	Kossuth FC (Pesterzsébet)	24	7	4	13	35	60	−25	18	
10	Rákospalotai FC	24	4	8	12	37	72	−35	16	
11	Terézváros FC	24	7	1	16	29	65	−36	15	
12	Merkur FC (Note: Before 1 September 1929, Pesterzsébeti Husos Football Club; it withdrew during the championship, then played again.)	24	6	3	15	22	64	−42	15	
13	Józsefváros FC (Note: Withdrew on 17 March 1930, its remaining matches were awarded to the opponents; it disbanded, then on 29 May 1930, it was re-formed as Józsefvárosi Viktória FC, then on 16 August, it entered the II.liga.)	24	1	0	23	12	44	−32	2	

== See also ==
- 1929–30 Magyar Kupa
- 1929–30 Nemzeti Bajnokság I
