= 1928–29 Nemzeti Bajnokság I =

Nemzeti Bajnokság I
- Season: 1928–29
- Champions: MTK Hungária

Statistics of Nemzeti Bajnokság I for the 1928–29 season.

== Overview ==
It was contested by 12 teams, and MTK Hungária FC won the championship.

== League standings ==
Pos	Team	Pld	W	D	L	GF	GA	GR	Pts
1	MTK Hungária FC	22	16	5	1	76	24	3.167	37
2	Ferencvárosi TC	22	16	4	2	79	20	3.950	36
3	Újpest FC	22	13	4	5	64	35	1.829	30
4	Bocskai FC	22	11	3	8	41	40	1.025	25
5	Bástya FC	22	10	3	9	40	35	1.143	23
6	III. Kerületi TUE	22	7	6	9	27	37	0.730	20
7	Nemzeti SC	22	7	5	10	33	39	0.846	19
8	Somogy FC	22	7	3	12	33	48	0.688	17
9	Kispest AC	22	5	6	11	27	48	0.563	16
10	Budai 33	22	5	5	12	32	60	0.533	15
11	Vasas SC	22	5	4	13	26	68	0.382	14
12	Sabaria FC	22	4	4	14	28	52	0.538	12

Source: rsssf.com

== Results ==
Home \ Away	KER	BÁS	BOC	B33	FTC	HUN	KIS	NEM	SAB	SOM	ÚJP	VAS
III. Kerület		2–3	0–2	4–1	1–2	0–3	1–1	1–1	2–1	0–0	0–3	3–1
Bástya	0–2		6–1	6–1	0–6	0–2	2–1	1–3	1–2	1–2	0–1	4–0
Bocskai	1–1	2–1		4–2	1–3	3–3	0–2	2–1	3–2	2–1	3–1	2–2
Budai 33	2–2	0–1	1–4		2–6	0–4	3–1	2–0	0–0	4–1	1–7	2–4
Ferencváros	3–0	0–1	5–1	4–0		2–2	5–0	1–1	6–0	5–0	2–2	9–0
Hungária	4–0	1–1	0–2	4–1	3–1		2–1	4–0	3–2	9–2	3–3	8–0
Kispest	0–2	0–3	3–0	2–4	1–6	1–1		4–1	0–0	1–1	0–3	2–1
Nemzeti	1–3	4–0	2–1	2–2	1–2	1–4	2–2		2–1	0–0	1–3	1–0
Sabaria	1–1	0–3	3–1	0–1	0–1	2–3	2–2	0–6		2–1	0–4	3–2
Somogy	2–0	0–1	0–1	1–0	1–5	2–5	0–1	4–1	2–1		3–5	2–1
Újpest	5–0	2–2	1–0	2–2	1–3	0–1	7–1	1–2	6–5	3–2		0–3
Vasas	0–2	3–3	0–5	1–1	2–2	0–7	2–1	1–0	2–1	0–6	1–4	

Source: rsssf.com
Legend: Blue = home team win; Yellow = draw; Red = away team win.
