= 1939–40 Nemzeti Bajnokság I =

Nemzeti Bajnokság I
- Season: 1939–40
- Champions: Ferencvárosi TC
- Relegated: Bocskai FC; Szürketaxi FC; Kassai AC; Nemzeti SC

The 1939–40 Nemzeti Bajnokság I was contested by 14 teams, and Ferencvárosi TC won the championship.

== League standings ==
Pos	Team	Pld	W	D	L	GF	GA	GR	Pts
1	Ferencvárosi TC	26	19	1	6	77	31	2.484	39
2	MTK Hungária FC	26	17	5	4	66	32	2.063	39
3	Újpest FC	26	15	8	3	60	34	1.765	38
4	Szeged FC	26	15	5	6	56	42	1.333	35
5	Kispest AC	26	14	5	7	70	41	1.707	33
6	Törekvés SE	26	11	6	9	37	41	0.902	28
7	Elektromos FC	26	11	5	10	48	48	1.000	27
8	Gamma FC	26	11	4	11	48	49	0.980	26
9	Szolnoki MÁV FC	26	9	5	12	37	46	0.804	23
10	Bocskai FC	26	10	3	13	38	60	0.633	23
11	Szombathelyi Haladás	26	10	2	14	44	59	0.746	22
12	Szürketaxi FC	26	5	4	17	36	75	0.480	14
13	Kassai AC	26	5	3	18	29	79	0.367	13
14	Nemzeti SC	26	2	0	24	15	24	0.625	4

Source: rsssf.com

== Results ==
Home \ Away	BOC	ELE	FTC	GAM	HAL	HUN	KAS	KIS	NEM	SZE	SZO	SZÜ	TÖR	ÚJP
Bocskai		2–4	0–5	1–4	0–8	1–2	3–3	0–3	+:- (Note: The match was settled with a goalless win for opponent because withdrawal of Nemzeti.)	1–2	1–1	2–1	1–0	1–0
Elektromos	2–2		0–0	0–0	3–1	0–2	4–2	5–3	3–1	0–1	0–2	3–2	0–1	1–1
Ferencváros	3–4	3–1		3–1	4–1	0–3	8–1	1–2	1–0	5–1	3–2	3–4	4–2	0–1
Gamma	2–3	2–1	0–3		0–1	1–2	4–0	3–4	+:-	3–3	4–1	0–3	2–2	3–4
Haladás	0–5	2–1	1–4	1–2		1–2	3–1	1–6	2–0	2–0	2–3	1–4	1–3	1–1
Hungária	0–1	5–0	0–2	2–2	7–2		4–1	3–3	+:-	1–3	2–1	3–3	3–0	4–2
Kassai	4–1	0–2	0–1	0–6	0–2	0–6		0–4	+:-	2–3	1–5	5–0	0–0	1–6
Kispest	3–1	2–4	1–5	4–0	2–0	1–3	8–1		3–1	1–1	4–2	6–0	1–3	0–0
Nemzeti	2–4	-:+	-:+	-:+	-:+	-:+	2–1	-:+		4–5	-:+	3–2	2–3	-:+
Szeged FC	2–0	4–1	1–4	4–0	5–2	3–2	3–0	1–5	+:-		1–2	2–0	0–0	2–3
Szolnok	2–1	4–3	0–1	1–2	1–2	1–1	0–1	1–1	+:-	0–4		3–1	1–1	1–3
Szürketaxi	0–2	2–4	1–7	1–4	1–4	1–5	0–2	2–1	+:-	2–2	1–1		1–1	1–3
Törekvés	3–1	1–3	0–6	1–2	2–1	0–1	2–2	1–0	+:-	2–3	4–1	2–1		2–1
Újpest	4–0	3–3	4–1	4–1	2–2	3–3	2–1	2–2	+:-	0–0	2–1	6–2	3–1	

Source: rsssf.com
Legend: Blue = home team win; Yellow = draw; Red = away team win.
