= 1930–31 Nemzeti Bajnokság I =

Nemzeti Bajnokság I
- Season: 1930–31
- Champions: Újpest FC
- Relegated: Bástya Szegedi AK; Pécs-Baranya FC

Final standings of the Hungarian League 1930–31 season

== Final standings ==
Pos	Team	Pld	W	D	L	GF	GA	GR	Pts	Qualification or relegation
1	Újpest FC	22	16	3	3	71	33	2.152	35	Champions
2	Hungária	22	12	6	4	67	33	2.030	30	
3	Ferencváros	22	12	5	5	60	28	2.143	29	
4	Bocskai FC	22	12	4	6	56	48	1.167	28	
5	Nemzeti SC	22	8	8	6	38	38	1.000	24	
6	III. Kerület	22	8	5	9	40	41	0.976	21	
7	Sabaria FC	22	8	4	10	32	40	0.800	20	
8	Vasas	22	6	5	11	41	52	0.788	17	
9	Budai 33	22	6	5	11	28	51	0.549	17	
10	Kispest	22	6	4	12	40	55	0.727	16	
11	Bástya FC	22	4	6	12	35	61	0.574	14	Relegated to NB II
12	Pécs-Baranya FC	22	5	3	14	27	55	0.491	13	Relegated to NB II

Source: rsssf.com

== Results ==
Home \ Away	KER	BÁS	BOC	B11	FTC	HUN	KIS	NEM	PÉC	SAB	ÚJP	VAS
III. Kerületi		3–1	4–0	1–0	1–0	0–6	3–3	1–2	3–2	2–0	1–2	4–1
Bástya	2–2		1–5	1–1	0–7	1–5	0–2	2–2	1–3	2–4	1–5	2–2
Bocskai	3–1	4–3		3–2	2–6	1–2	5–1	1–1	3–2	3–3	4–2	1–1
Budai 11	3–1	2–2	0–3		0–4	0–0	1–0	1–2	0–1	3–2	1–7	2–0
Ferencváros	4–2	2–0	2–3	5–0		4–1	5–2	0–0	4–0	1–1	1–3	2–5
Hungária	1–1	3–3	5–1	8–3	1–1		3–1	3–0	7–0	3–1	0–2	6–3
Kispest	3–3	2–4	3–1	0–4	1–2	2–1		1–1	4–0	1–1	2–6	5–3
Nemzeti	1–4	1–2	3–1	1–1	2–2	2–1	5–3		2–3	2–1	3–5	0–0
Pécs-Baranya	0–0	1–4	3–6	1–2	0–4	2–2	0–3	2–1		4–0	0–2	0–0
Sabaria	3–2	1–0	0–2	1–0	0–1	2–3	1–0	0–0	3–1		1–3	3–1
Újpest	2–1	3–0	2–2	6–0	1–1	2–2	3–1	1–2	3–2	2–4		4–1
Vasas	2–0	1–3	1–2	2–2	3–2	1–4	3–0	3–5	1–0	4–0	3–5	

Source: rsssf.com
Legend: Blue = home team win; Yellow = draw; Red = away team win.
