= 1929–30 Magyar Kupa =

Tournament details
- Country: Hungary

Final positions
- Champions: Bocskai FC
- Runners-up: Szegedi Bástya

The 1929–30 Magyar Kupa (English: Hungarian Cup) was the 12th season of Hungary's annual knock-out cup football competition.

== Final ==
26 June 1930
17:30 (UTC+2)

Bocskai FC	5–1	Szegedi Bástya
Teleki 5', 12', 23'; Markos 10'; Sághi 25'	Report	Kitl 13'

Hungária körúti stadion, Budapest
Attendance: 1,200
Referee: Árpád Klein (Hungary)

== See also ==
- 1929–30 Nemzeti Bajnokság I
