= Pál Teleki (footballer) =

Hungarian footballer

Personal information
- Full name: Teleki Pál
- Date of birth: 5 March 1906
- Place of birth: Arad, Austria-Hungary
- Date of death: 14 October 1985 (aged 79)
- Place of death: Debrecen, Hungary
- Position: Forward

Senior career*
Years	Team	Apps	(Gls)
1924–1926	AMEF Arad	34	(16)
1926–1927	Chinezul Timişoara	20	(12)
1927–1937	Bocskai FC	214	(90)
Total		268	(118)

International career
1927	Romania	1	(0)
1933–1937	Hungary	8	(2)

Managerial career
- 1957–1958: Diósgyőri
- * Club domestic league appearances and goals

Pál Teleki (5 March 1906 – 14 October 1985) was a Hungarian footballer who played for Hungary in the 1934 FIFA World Cup and a manager. He also played for Romanian clubs AMEF Arad and Chinezul Timişoara, and once turned out for the Romanian national side. He later played for Hungarian outfit Bocskai FC.

== Honours ==
Chinezul Timişoara

- Liga I: 1926–27

Bocskai FC

- Hungarian Cup: 1929–30
