= 1927–28 Nemzeti Bajnokság I =

Nemzeti Bajnokság I
- Season: 1927–28
- Champions: Ferencvárosi TC

Statistics of Nemzeti Bajnokság I for the 1927–28 season.

== Overview ==
It was contested by 12 teams, and Ferencvárosi TC won the championship.

== League standings ==
Pos	Team	Pld	W	D	L	GF	GA	GR	Pts
1	Ferencvárosi TC	22	19	1	2	77	23	3.348	39
2	MTK Hungária FC	22	16	3	3	68	26	2.615	35
3	Újpest FC	22	15	4	3	62	25	2.480	34
4	Sabaria FC	22	15	3	4	49	29	1.690	33
5	III. Kerületi TUE	22	8	3	11	41	51	0.804	19
6	Nemzeti SC	22	7	4	11	41	47	0.872	18
7	Bástya FC	22	5	6	11	26	44	0.591	16
8	Budai 33	22	5	6	11	23	64	0.359	16
9	Kispest AC	22	6	3	13	39	61	0.639	15
10	Vasas SC	22	6	2	14	37	57	0.649	14
11	Bocskai FC	22	4	5	13	31	50	0.620	13
12	Miskolci Attila	22	4	4	14	27	44	0.614	12

Source: rsssf.com

== Results ==
Home \ Away	KER	BÁS	BOC	B33	FTC	HUN	KIS	MIS	NEM	SAB	ÚJP	VAS
III. Kerület		1–3	0–2	0–2	1–2	2–7	3–2	4–1	3–2	2–3	0–4	4–0
Bástya	0–2		1–0	0–0	1–2	0–3	4–3	0–0	3–2	1–2	0–4	2–5
Bocskai	2–2	0–0		0–1	2–3	2–5	2–3	0–2	1–2	2–2	4–2	2–0
Budai 33	1–1	2–2	1–4		1–8	1–6	0–2	3–2	1–1	1–3	2–2	2–1
Ferencváros	6–1	5–0	3–0	8–0		3–2	4–2	3–0	4–2	1–3	1–0	2–1
Hungária	3–1	2–1	4–1	7–0	2–1		6–0	1–0	2–3	1–5	1–0	6–0
Kispest	2–3	1–2	1–1	2–2	1–5	0–1		3–1	2–2	3–0	2–4	3–2
Miskolci Attila	0–3	1–1	1–1	5–1	1–5	1–2	5–3		1–2	0–1	0–3	1–1
Nemzeti	2–2	1–0	4–1	0–1	1–4	1–3	8–0	1–4		0–3	1–3	4–3
Sabaria	4–2	2–1	2–0	3–0	0–3	1–1	1–0	3–1	0–0		1–2	5–2
Újpest	2–1	1–1	9–3	4–0	1–1	0–0	5–2	2–0	4–1	4–2		3–0
Vasas	1–3	5–3	2–1	3–1	1–3	3–3	0–2	1–0	2–1	2–3	2–3	

Source: rsssf.com
Legend: Blue = home team win; Yellow = draw; Red = away team win.
