= 1926–27 Nemzeti Bajnokság I =

Nemzeti Bajnokság I
- Season: 1926–27
- Champions: Ferencvárosi TC
- Matches played: 90
- Goals scored: 315 (3.5 per match)

Statistics of Nemzeti Bajnokság I for the 1926–27 season.

== Overview ==
It was contested by 10 teams, and Ferencvárosi TC won the championship.

== League standings ==
Pos	Team	Pld	W	D	L	GF	GA	GR	Pts
1	Ferencvárosi TC	18	13	4	1	51	18	2.833	30
2	Újpest FC	18	10	3	5	33	20	1.650	23
3	MTK Hungária FC	18	8	3	7	30	24	1.250	19
4	Sabaria FC	18	8	3	7	30	33	0.909	19
5	III. Kerületi TUE	18	8	2	8	35	39	0.897	18
6	Vasas SC	18	7	4	7	27	32	0.844	18
7	Bástya FC	18	6	4	8	26	27	0.963	16
8	Nemzeti SC	18	5	4	9	34	38	0.895	14
9	Kispest AC	18	3	7	8	24	37	0.649	13
10	Budai 33	18	3	4	11	25	47	0.532	10

Source: rsssf.com

== Results ==
Home \ Away	KER	BÁS	B33	FTC	HUN	KIS	NEM	SAB	ÚJP	VAS
III. Kerület		3–1	3–6	0–5	2–4	2–2	2–0	3–1	1–0	2–3
Bástya	1–2		1–1	0–0	1–2	2–4	4–2	0–4	0–1	3–0
Budai 33	0–3	1–3		0–3	0–2	1–1	3–2	0–1	2–7	2–4
Ferencváros	5–0	1–3	6–2		2–2	1–0	3–3	2–0	0–0	2–0
Hungária	0–2	0–1	4–1	1–4		2–2	2–0	0–1	0–1	3–1
Kispest	4–2	1–1	0–0	2–6	0–1		2–1	2–2	2–5	1–2
Nemzeti	2–5	0–0	4–2	2–3	1–0	0–0		3–4	4–1	1–1
Sabaria	2–1	0–4	2–4	2–3	2–1	4–1	2–5		0–2	0–0
Újpest	2–2	3–0	1–0	1–2	1–1	2–0	1–2	0–1		2–1
Vasas	1–0	2–1	0–0	0–3	2–5	3–0	3–2	2–2	2–3	

Source: rsssf.com
Legend: Blue = home team win; Yellow = draw; Red = away team win.
