= 1929–30 Nemzeti Bajnokság I =

Nemzeti Bajnokság I
- Season: 1929–30
- Champions: Újpest FC
- Relegated: Miskolci Attila Kör; Somogy FC

Final standings of the Hungarian League 1929–30 season.

== Final standings ==
Pos	Team	Pld	W	D	L	GF	GA	GR	Pts	Qualification or relegation
1	Újpest FC	22	18	2	2	74	30	2.467	38	Champions
2	Ferencváros	22	15	6	1	80	27	2.963	36	
3	Hungária	22	10	7	5	54	36	1.500	27	
4	III. Kerület	22	9	7	6	36	35	1.029	25	
5	Bocskai FC	22	7	6	9	43	48	0.896	20	
6	Kispest	22	6	7	9	21	39	0.538	19	
7	Budai 11	22	5	8	9	28	31	0.903	18	
8	Bástya FC	22	7	3	12	41	53	0.774	17	
9	Pécs-Baranya FC	22	5	7	10	31	50	0.620	17	
10	Nemzeti SC	22	6	4	12	26	44	0.591	16	
11	Miskolci Attila	22	5	6	11	22	40	0.550	16	Relegated to NB II
12	Somogy FC	22	3	9	10	31	54	0.574	15	Relegated to NB II

Source: rsssf.com

== Results ==
Home \ Away	KER	BÁS	BOC	B11	FTC	HUN	KIS	MIS	NEM	PÉC	SOM	ÚJP
III. Kerület		1–0	0–0	2–1	1–2	1–3	5–1	2–0	2–1	1–1	2–2	2–3
Bástya	2–3		1–4	2–3	0–4	2–5	3–1	5–2	1–2	5–1	1–1	3–1
Bocskai	0–1	0–5		1–1	2–3	2–2	0–1	3–1	2–2	2–1	2–2	2–6
Budai 11	1–1	7–0	3–2		1–1	0–1	0–0	0–0	0–1	3–0	2–0	1–2
Ferencváros	8–0	0–3	1–1	2–1		4–0	4–0	3–1	7–2	2–2	5–0	1–1
Hungária	1–0	6–1	5–2	5–1	3–3		1–1	1–1	2–0	1–1	6–1	2–5
Kispest	1–2	0–0	0–2	2–2	1–9	2–1		2–1	1–0	0–0	0–0	1–2
Miskolci Attila	1–1	1–1	2–3	1–0	0–6	1–0	1–1		2–0	0–1	0–1	1–4
Nemzeti SC	3–3	1–5	0–2	5–1	1–3	0–3	1–0	1–1		4–0	1–0	0–1
Pécs-Baranya	0–3	2–0	0–4	3–0	4–4	2–2	2–3	0–3	3–0		2–2	0–6
Somogy	1–1	2–0	7–4	0–0	2–6	2–2	1–3	1–2	1–1	1–3		1–4
Újpest	3–2	6–1	4–3	0–0	1–2	4–2	2–0	4–0	4–0	4–3	7–3	

Source: rsssf.com
Legend: Blue = home team win; Yellow = draw; Red = away team win.
