= 1931–32 Nemzeti Bajnokság I =

Nemzeti Bajnokság I
- Season: 1931–32
- Champions: Ferencvárosi TC
- Relegated: Vasas FC; Sabaria FC

Statistics of Nemzeti Bajnokság I in the 1931–32 season.

== Overview ==
It was contested by 12 teams, and Ferencvárosi TC won the championship, winning all 22 of their matches. Sabaria FC were expelled with seven matches left to play; these matches were awarded to their opponents by default, with no goals recorded.

== League standings ==
Pos	Team	Pld	W	D	L	GF	GA	GR	Pts
1	Ferencvárosi TC	22	22	0	0	105	18	5.833	44
2	Újpest FC	22	16	4	2	67	32	2.094	36
3	MTK Hungária FC	22	16	3	3	62	24	2.583	35
4	Bocskai FC	22	11	4	7	43	46	0.935	26
5	III. Kerületi TUE	22	11	2	9	37	44	0.841	24
6	Budai 11	22	8	3	11	31	43	0.721	19
7	Somogy FC	22	7	2	13	23	52	0.442	16
8	Miskolci Attila	22	5	5	12	23	40	0.575	15
9	Kispest AC	22	4	6	12	29	54	0.537	14
10	Nemzeti SC	22	5	4	13	27	52	0.519	14
11	Vasas SC	22	5	3	14	41	69	0.594	13
12	Sabaria FC	22	3	2	17	17	31	0.548	8

Source: rsssf.com

== Results ==
Home \ Away	KER	BOC	B11	FTC	HUN	KIS	MIS	NEM	SAB	SOM	VAS	ÚJP
III. Kerület		0–2	2–1	1–3	0–5	1–3	0–1	3–1	0–1	2–0	4–2	1–4
Bocskai	2–3		4–1	1–4	3–5	1–1	3–1	3–1	2–1	1–0	2–2	6–6
Budai 11	0–2	3–1		1–3	0–0	5–1	0–3	1–1	2–1	2–3	4–1	1–4
Ferencváros	7–2	6–1	7–1		4–2	5–2	4–0	7–0	3–1	6–1	5–1	1–0
Hungária	0–0	3–1	2–1	1–5		6–0	5–0	4–0	1–0	2–0	4–2	1–1
Kispest	1–3	0–1	1–1	0–2	1–5		1–1	0–4	1–3	1–1	5–0	2–5
Miskolci Attila	1–2	1–2	3–1	0–3	0–1	0–0		2–3	1–1	0–0	2–1	0–1
Nemzeti	2–3	2–3	0–1	1–5	0–2	0–3	0–0		1–0	1–0	2–5	1–1
Sabaria	-:+ (Note: The match was settled with a goalless win.)	-:+	-:+	1–5	-:+	0–0	0–4	-:+		-:+	1–2	-:+
Somogy	0–2	3–0	0–1	1–10	1–8	2–1	3–0	3–2	1–3		3–2	1–5
Vasas	2–2	2–3	1–3	0–5	0–5	2–4	5–3	4–4	3–1	2–0		1–4
Újpest	6–4	1–1	3–1	0–5	5–0	6–1	4–0	2–1	5–3	1–0	3–1	

Source: rsssf.com
Legend: Blue = home team win; Yellow = draw; Red = away team win.
