= Sabaria FC =

Hungarian football club

- Full name: Sabaria Football Club
- Founded: 1912
- Dissolved: 1949
Home colours	Away colours

Sabaria FC was a Hungarian association football club from the town of Szombathely, Hungary.

== History ==
Football was played in Szombathely by the late 19th century. The football section of the Szombathely Sports Association was established in 1910. In 1912, the Szombathely Craftsmen and Merchants' Hungarian Athletic Club (SzAK) was formed after separating from the association. During the early 1920s, the club won the district championship seven consecutive times and reached the national championship final in 1923 and 1924.

In the summer of 1926, building on the SzAK roster, the Szombathely team entered the professional league under the name Sabaria. “The team is practically ready to go; most of the players have already signed contracts. With one or two exceptions, they are not counting on players from the capital or other regions; they are relying on local talent. From the old SzAK, Weinhardt, Prém, Nagy, Vámos, Holzbauer, and Németh will be joining Sabaria, but SzSE is also contributing players—specifically its three best: Sladovics, Bass, and Horváth,” a newspaper wrote about the yellow-and-blues in August 1926.

Sabaria FC debuted in the 1926–27 season of the Hungarian League and finished third.

The team secured a 4–1 victory in Szombathely against Kispest on September 5, 1926. The following week, Sabaria defeated Újpest at home. István Pluhár, writing in a local newspaper, described the occasion: "The entire community of Szombathely turned out to watch Sabaria's big match. Sabaria was rewarded with great interest by defeating Újpest's fearsome team in a hard-fought battle, both confidently and deservedly."[citation needed]

In its first professional season, Sabaria missed the podium because of a worse goal difference, having defeated Hungária 2–1 in the final round. The team from the capital soon got their revenge, winning 3–2 in the Central European Cup qualifier, thus securing their spot in the international competition.

Sabaria finished fourth again the following season, suffering four losses. They defeated Ferencváros 3–1 in front of 28,000 spectators at Üllői út. Newsreels covered this match, and fans can still watch Ferenc Weinhardt’s saves to this day, while the local newspaper devoted two and a half pages to the game. After the 5-1 victory over Hungária, the Budapest crowd carried the Vas County footballers off the field on their shoulders…

However, maintaining a successful team was expensive; in addition to player salaries, the club had to cover travel expenses and the costs of hosting referees, among other costs. Moreover, Sabaria didn’t even have its own stadium; initially, it hosted its opponents at the SzAK stadium, and later at Városliget, unless it ceded home-field advantage. On the revenue side, in addition to ticket sales, there were advertisements, as well as so-called “tours” or “butter-and-bread tours,” during which the teams played matches against foreign opponents.

In December 1928, following a disappointing fall season, Sabaria pulled off a surprise: as the first Hungarian club, it traveled overseas, hoping to generate some revenue while also bringing its squad together. “Sabaria is otherwise traveling fully prepared. They’re taking several balls with them, in case they play with a different kind of ball there—one that’s unfamiliar to Sabaria’s players. They’ve packed a whole suitcase full of flags. Among them is our national flag, adorned with the large angelic coat of arms, which they’ll hang at the hotel and possibly hoist on the ship’s mast. “They are bringing flags for every club and every association; they will display flags on their cars and on the train cars—both the national colors and the Sabaria flag,” our newspaper reported on the preparations. The team even brought blank contracts with them, in case they could lure a few Hungarian players back home.

Well, the tour—which took in Cuba, Mexico, and the United States—ended up lasting four months, with a flu epidemic and an uprising, among other things, making life difficult for the band. Although the players received 3,000 pengő in addition to the experience of a lifetime, the club’s revenues fell short of expectations. Moreover, their results in the league did not improve, and Sabaria was relegated.

They returned after one season, but were unable to replicate their previous outstanding performance. The ripple effects of the Great Depression also played a role in Sabaria being unable to play its last seven matches in the spring of 1932; due to severe financial problems, the club was expelled in April because it could not even pay the 800 pengő owed to its opponents.

“Sabaria can no longer participate in the league; its results are considered null and void, the team has been placed last, and five of its players have been ‘seized’ by the association,” reported Nemzeti Sport on its front page on April 27, 1932. The club did not even live to see its sixth birthday, essentially becoming the first shooting star of Hungarian professional soccer. It shone briefly, then quickly faded away…

A new club was formed from the ruins under the name Szombathelyi FC, but from then on, the railway workers’ Haladás played a dominant role in the city. MÁV’s team, which remained amateur throughout, earned its place in the national championship as national champions in the summer of 1936. No other Szombathely club has reached the top division since then, although in 1942, SzFC—which included Gyula Lóránt among its players—missed out by only a narrow goal difference.

The name Sabaria next came to prominence around the turn of the 1970s and 1980s, but this team—which wore red, white, and blue—had essentially nothing to do with the Sabaria of fifty years earlier. That is to say, it was, in a way: Sabaria SE was formed in 1975 through the merger of Szombathelyi SE Dózsa (from which the later SzAK split off even before World War I) and Savaria Cipőgyár SE, and it hosted its opponents partly at the Városligeti Sports Complex until its dissolution in 1993.

Financial difficulties during the early years of the Great Depression affected the club's operations. In April 1932, Sabaria was expelled from the league after failing to fulfil its financial obligations and complete its remaining fixtures. The club subsequently ceased operations, and a successor club, Szombathelyi FC, was formed. In later decades, football in Szombathely became primarily associated with Szombathelyi Haladás.

== Name Changes ==
- 1912-1912: Szombathelyi Acél
- 1912–1913: Szombathelyi Iparosok Kereskedők és Munkások TK
- 1913–1926: Szombathelyi Athletikai Klub
- 1926–1929: Sabaria Labdarúgók Szövetkezete
- 1929–1932: Sabaria Football Club
- 1932–1945: Szombathelyi FC
- 1945–1946: Barátság Szombathelyi AK
- 1946–1949: Szombathelyi AK
- 1949: merger with Szombathelyi Bőrgyár and Szombathelyi Textil

== Honours ==
- Nemzeti Bajnokság II:
  - Winners (1): 1929–30

== Seasons ==
The table below shows the seasons of Sabaria FC.

Season	Tier	Club's name	Position	Pts
1926–27	1	Sabaria LSZ	4 / 10	19
1927–28	1	Sabaria LSZ	4 / 12	33
1928–29	1	Sabaria LSZ	12 / 12	12
1929–30	2	Sabaria FC	1 / 13	44
1930–31	1	Sabaria FC	7 / 12	20
1931–32	1	Sabaria FC	12 / 12	8
