= Bocskai FC =

Hungarian football club

- Full name: Bocskai Football Club
- Founded: 1926
- Dissolved: 1940
Home colours	Away colours

Bocskai Football Club was a Hungarian football club from the town of Debrecen.

== History ==
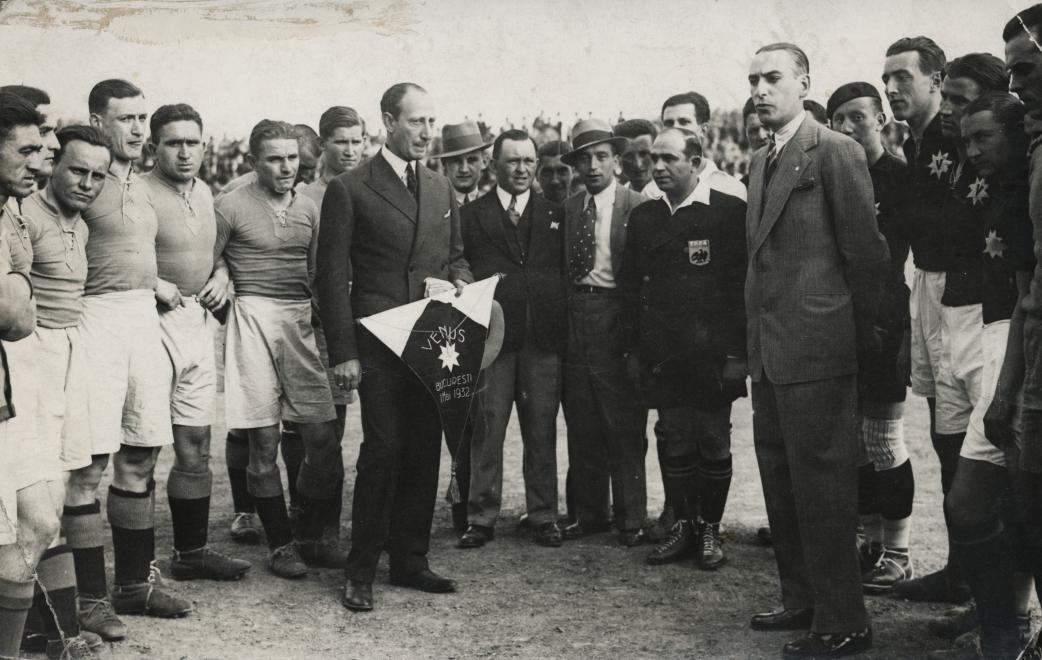
Bocskai FC after losing to Venus Bucharest in 1932

On August 1, 1926, Nemzeti Sport reported that Bocskay FC had been founded in Debrecen. The newly formed professional team—whose name was initially written with a ypsilon—entered the then-forming professional league by redeeming the deposit posted by DVSC, and began operations independently of the railway club but with the involvement of its leaders. Two weeks later, as part of their preparations, the team hosted the two star clubs, Ferencváros and Hungária, at the Vasutas Stadium on Diószegi Road (later Vágóhíd Street).

At Bocskay, which wore yellow and blue colors and initially operated as a cooperative, the roster was built primarily around local players, many of whom had previously played for the amateur DVSC. The team started in the professional Second Division, finishing four points behind the champion, Miskolci Attila Kör, but ultimately won the promotion playoff against Budapesti AK FC, so by the summer of 1927, they were already preparing for the top-flight competition in the city of Cívis.

In the opening round, defending champions Ferencváros visited the Diószegi út stadium. “A record crowd turned out, with 6,000 people gathering for the big match, and despite the management’s extensive preparations, seating the large number of spectators proved extremely difficult; many could not find their seats. “Well, maybe next time,” wrote our newspaper’s correspondent about the match, which ended in a 3-0 victory for Ferencváros. Bocskay also struggled to find its footing in the top division; the team had to wait until October 30 for its first win, but then “the Debrecen team crushed the Buda side with magnificent momentum.”

The 4-1 victory over Budai Harihárom in 1927 was not followed by another win; the team had to wait eleven rounds (!) for their next victory. By the end of the season, Bocskay had pulled itself together as best it could, and on top of that, it was finally able to field the excellent striker Pál Teleki, who had been signed from Temesvár. The team ultimately finished in 11th place, ahead of Miskolc, and thus played a relegation playoff to stay in the top division. After a 1-1 draw in the first leg against Turul FC, the yellow-and-blues won 4-0 in Debrecen, thereby retaining their place in the top flight.

This match can certainly be called a turning point, as from that point on, the team from Hajdúság went from strength to strength, eventually becoming the best team in the region after Sabaria and Bástya had fallen on hard times. At the end of the 1928–1929 season, the Debrecen team finished fourth, with only clubs from the capital and those near Budapest—remember, Újpest was still an independent town—finishing ahead of them. An even greater success was when Bocskai FC won the 1929-30 Magyar Kupa season by beating Szegedi Bástya 5–1 in the final at Üllői úti stadion in Budapest.

The team, featuring Farkas – Dr. Fejér, Molnár – Villányi, Sághy, Keviczky – Markos, Vincze, Teleki, Moóré, and Marosi, had already decided the outcome of the cup within the first half-hour; Teleki’s team led 4–0 in the 24th minute on Hungária Road in the sweltering heat. The organizing MLSZ did not pay much attention to the final; the organizers did not even bring the trophy to the event, which drew only 1,200 spectators and, according to Sporthírlap, had the atmosphere of a “provincial garden party.”

“Toward the end of the match, when it was already clear that Bocskay would win the Cup, the Debrecen fans in the stands began asking louder and louder, ‘Where is the Cup?’ Of course, if Budapest teams had played in the final, the beautiful trophy would be standing here on the sidelines. The Debrecen fans were right…” – reported Nemzeti Sport on the awkward situation.

The cohesive team—which had played 53 matches with the same lineup, including the cup final—headed from Budapest to Zagreb, where it played two friendly (but lucrative) matches, defeating Gradjanski (3–2) and HASK (4–1). No wonder the footballers returning home at the end of June were greeted with great joy in Debrecen.

“At exactly six o’clock, almost to the minute, the train pulled in, and before it had even come to a stop, a thunderous cheer erupted from the throats of the crowd of over a thousand people. When the train’s wheels came to a stop, the railway factory band struck up the tune: ‘You can’t go corn-picking with Bocskay, you can’t go corn-picking with Bocskay…’ The players stepping off the cars were nearly torn apart by the crowd of relatives and fans. “The players have probably never received as many kisses in their entire lives from the beautiful women and girls of Debrecen as they did right there at the train station,” Nemzeti Sport reported.

Bocskai’s (spelled with an “i” from the mid-1930s onward) success story continued; four years later, the team secured a podium finish in the league as well, with the yellow-and-blues winning the bronze medal at the end of the 1933–1934 season. Moreover, by the summer of 1934, the team’s new home in Nagyerdő was completed, designed by the club’s co-chairman, István Sajó.

The Nemzeti Sport newspaper also featured the renderings of the arena, which was to be built using an earth-wall construction method, and even called it the cheapest stadium in Europe. “The acoustics of the new stadium are such that if just two people shout, the sky echoes—imagine what it will be like when thousands upon thousands of Debrecen fans cheer on Bocskai. Maybe they’ll even hear it in Budapest…”

The team was able to step onto the international stage in the Mitropa Cup, where Teleki’s team faced the Italian Bologna FC. Following a 2-0 defeat in the away leg in Italy, a 2-1 home victory in front of 12,000 spectators at Nagyerdő was not enough to advance.

By the second half of the 1930s, the team’s performance had declined, while the club’s debt continued to grow. In 1935, it finished only ninth; after two sixth-place finishes, it ended the season in 11th and then 12th place in a league that had expanded to fourteen teams. “The Debrecen club has been struggling with a severe crisis for years. By last fall, it could no longer even assemble a leadership team, so Dr. József Zöld, Debrecen’s deputy mayor, was appointed as an official commissioner to head the club. At first, it seemed that the government commissioner would succeed in putting Bocskai on a new footing. Dr. József Zöld did everything in his power to get the stuck wagon moving again, but his efforts also proved fruitless. “Even the government commissioner had to admit that Bocskai was so ailing that it was impossible to save it,” Nemzeti Sport concluded sadly in July 1940. Although the team from Hajdúság finished the season in a position to stay up, the dire financial situation was beyond repair.

On July 31, 1940—exactly 14 years after its founding—the decree dissolving Bocskai was signed at the Ministry of the Interior. Many of the team’s players continued their careers with the amateur DVSC, then wearing purple and white colors; the railway workers later moved to Nagyerdő.

It took seventy years for Debrecen football to reach its second golden age; in the second half of the 2000s, Debreceni VSC won league titles one after another and became the most successful team outside Budapest. Eighty years later, the new stadium, called Nagyerdei Stadion, was inaugurated in Nagyerdő, on the site of the old arena, a place that preserves the memories of the past.

== Honours ==
- Hungarian Cup:
  - Winners (1): 1929–30

== Seasons ==
The table below shows the seasons of Bocskai FC.

Season	Tier	Club's name	Position	Pts
1926–27	2	Bocskai LSz	2 / 14	39
1927–28	1	Bocskay FC	11 / 12	13
1928–29	1	Bocskai FC	4 / 12	25
1929–30	1	Bocskay FC	5 / 12	20
1930–31	1	Bocskay FC	4 / 12	28
1931–32	1	Bocskay FC	4 / 12	26
1932–33	1	Bocskay FC	6 / 12	23
1933–34	1	Bocskay FC	3 / 12	27
1934–35	1	Bocskay FC	9 / 12	17
1935–36	1	Bocskay FC	6 / 14	24
1936–37	1	Bocskay FC	6 / 14	29
1937–38	1	Bocskay FC	11 / 14	20
1938–39	1	Bocskay FC	12 / 14	13
1939–40	1	Bocskay FC	10 / 14	23
