= Szegedi AK =

Association football club in Hungary

- Full name: Szegedi Atlétikai Klub
- Founded: 1899
- Dissolved: 1976
Home colours	Away colours

Szegedi Atlétikai Klub, known simply as Szegedi AK, was a Hungarian football club from the town of Szeged, Hungary.

== Names ==
- 1899–1926: Szegedi Atlétikai Klub (SZAK)
- 1926–1931: Bástya FC
- 1931–1944: Szeged FC
- 1945–1949: Szegedi Atlétikai Klub (SZAK)
- 1949–1950: Szegedi MTE
- 1950–1957: Szegedi Petőfi
- 1957–1976: Szegedi Atlétikai Klub (SZAK)

== History ==
This little joke appeared in an issue of Nemzeti Sport a hundred years ago, and it perfectly illustrated the state of soccer in Szeged, as the city’s soccer program had risen to the highest level thanks to the professional expertise and immense financial support of club president Tivadar Holzer. In 1911, the merchant family was granted a noble title by Franz Joseph for their work in boosting the Hungarian economy and adopted the prefix “Bástyai.” Holzer founded the Szeged Athletic Club in 1899, and fourteen years later, thanks to his significant financial contribution, the grandstand at the Újszeged sports complex—which he donated to the club—was inaugurated.

After World War I, the Szeged team, like the one in Szombathely, became the best in the region; in the first half of the 1920s, it won the Southern District Championship four times and became the provincial champion in 1922. As our photo shows, in keeping with the mood of the times, a map of historic Hungary and an inscription were placed on the wooden grandstand of the Újszeged sports complex: “A truncated Hungary is not a country; a whole Hungary is heaven.”

SzAK also made a name for Hungarian soccer abroad, defeating the Rome national team 5–2 in the Italian capital in early 1923.

Newspaper correspondent Dezső Gyovai wrote of the match in Rome: “The boys threw themselves into the match with a vehemence never before seen at home, and we secured a three-goal victory with a performance that would have earned the highest praise even in Budapest.”

Three years later, among the provincial soccer teams, in addition to the Szombathely team described in the previous section, the Szeged team also tested its mettle in the newly organized professional league. The financial resources necessary to get started were provided by President Tivadar Holzer of Bástya, and the roster was significantly strengthened; among others, national team midfielder Lajos Wéber arrived from Bologna, Italy, and Austrian players also joined the team. Out of respect for its patron, the club adopted its president’s noble prefix, making Bástya Szegedi AK the first Hungarian professional team to include its main sponsor in its name. Lajos Bányai was appointed head coach; he had previously earned the nickname “Wundertrainer” in Germany and later won two championships with Újpest.

During their preparations, the team faced off against Ferencváros, among others; four thousand spectators turned out for the friendly match on August 20, 1926.

Szegedi AK debuted in the 1926–27 season of the Hungarian League and finished in seventh place.

“All things considered, Bástya’s performance was satisfactory, and once the team gels, they will be a formidable force. The talent is there; now it’s up to Coach Bányai to see what comes next,” summarized the Délmagyarország reporter. About two months later, the teams met in the league as well, and thanks to Bástya’s effective attacking play, they defeated defending champions Ferencváros 3–1.

“The boys fought with heart and soul, scoring three undeniable goals. The field and the home crowd may have contributed to the victory, but every victory has its reasons,” the club president said in assessing the success. Regarding the field, Holzer noted that the playing surface had become quite narrow, which opponents found difficult to adjust to. This is evidenced by the fact that the team remained undefeated at home until March 1927 and did not concede more than one goal in any subsequent match.

Nine years ago, Péter Csillag wrote in *Képes Sport* that Gyula Juhász, a poet and journalist from Szeged with an interest in soccer, Gyula Juhász, a poet and journalist from Szeged with an interest in soccer, was also a “permanent” season ticket holder for the team during the 1927–1928 season; in March 1928, his rousing poem titled “Olympic Ode” was published in Délmagyarország ahead of the match against Szombathely.

“Bástya, my mother with the golden shield, / Nothing is more important to me than your cause / And the Sunday contest, / In which we will face off against Sabária. / We have reaped many victories in the competitions / (Though sometimes failure struck us like a blow, / But I speak of this only in parentheses, / So that the uninitiated may not hear) / And we would adorn our home with trophies / And silver goblets, and certificates. / Fragrant wreaths / We would win many. Our merits are brilliant / In silent kicks on the field. / (Though sometimes we were shut out.)…” – so began the piece, into which the poet even wove the names of the regular starters. However, it did not bring good luck; Sabaria won 2–1 in Újszeged.

Bástya typically finished in the middle of the pack, placing seventh in both its first and second seasons. The 1928–1929 season was its most successful; the Szeged club finished fifth that year and reached the Hungarian Cup final a year later. In the final on Hungária Boulevard—where the MLSZ didn’t even bring the trophy—Debrecen’s Bocskay easily won 5–1 in the sweltering heat, in front of 1,200 spectators.

“We’re not even in end-of-season form anymore; we’re in post-season form. Bocskay played a match as recently as Sunday, while we haven’t seen a ball in three weeks, so we couldn’t get going in the first half, and Bocskay soon took a two-goal lead,” complained Rezső Emődi, Bástya’s defender, in the locker room. “They played soccer, that’s why they won,” added his teammate, Ferenc Szedlacsik.

The Szeged team failed to deliver good football the following season. At the end of that season, a win in the final round would have secured them tenth place and guaranteed their survival, but since they lost 2–0 to Kispest, they had to play in a relegation playoff. To make matters worse, the president later resigned, salaries were delayed, and the date for the relegation playoff was only set with great difficulty, months after the end of the season.

Finally, at the end of July, they played the promotion playoff against Attila Miskolci, who had previously been accused of bribery. Szeged’s 3–1 lead from the first leg proved insufficient; the Borsod team won 4–1 at home and secured promotion to the top division. For a time, there was hope that the Nemzeti Bajnokság I would be expanded; even Minister of Culture Kuno Klebelsberg supported the idea, but the league was not expanded to fourteen teams after all. The Bástya general assembly thus voted to dissolve the club, bringing its five-year history to an end.

However, football life on the banks of the Tisza did not come to a halt; several former Bástya players appeared in the colors of the newly formed Szeged FC. “I’m staying here, even if it means living on dry bread, and together with my teammates, I’ll fight with all my strength to ensure that Szeged’s team is once again among the best. Bástya went down with us, and Szeged FC will rise with us,” one of them told Nemzeti Sport in September 1931.

He was right: Szeged FC advanced to the top division undefeated, where it competed without interruption for more than a decade, celebrating a bronze medal in 1941—the city’s highest-ever finish in soccer history. Today’s team on the banks of the Tisza, the Szeged-Csanád Grosics Academy, is currently in seventh place in the second-division league, awaiting the resumption of play.

The team played 22 seasons in the top flight until 1951.

In 1976 the club was merged into Szegedi EAC which was also dissolved in 1999.

== Honours ==
- Nemzeti Bajnokság II:
  - Winners (3): 1943–44, 1945, 1949–50
- Nemzeti Bajnokság III:
  - Winners (1): 1960–61
- Hungarian Cup:
  - Runners-up (1): 1929–30

== Seasons ==
The table below shows the seasons of Szegedi AK.

Season	Tier	Club's name	Position	Pts
1908–09	2	Szegedi AK	2 / 5	12
1909–10	2	Szegedi AK	3 / 4	4
1910–11	2	Szegedi AK	4 / 5	7
1911–12	2	Szegedi AK	2 / 10	25
1912–13	2	Szegedi AK	2 / 8	23
1913–14	2	Szegedi AK	1 / 11	33
1916–17	2	Szegedi AK	3 / 6	10
1917–18	2	Szegedi AK	2 / 6	13
1918–19	2	Szegedi AK	3 / 4	2
1919–20	2	Szegedi AK	1 / 10	34
1920–21	2	Szegedi AK	1 / 9	28
1921–22	2	Szegedi AK	1 / 8	25
1922–23	2	Szegedi AK	1 / 10	25
1923–24	2	Szegedi AK	2 / 8	20
1924–25	2	Szegedi AK	1 / 8	26
1925–26	2	Szegedi AK	1 / 10	32
1926–27	1	Bástya Szegedi AK	7 / 10	16
1927–28	1	Bástya Szegedi AK	7 / 12	16
1928–29	1	Bástya Szegedi AK	5 / 12	23
1929–30	1	Bástya Szegedi AK	8 / 12	17
1930–31	1	Bástya Szegedi AK	11 / 12	14
1931–32	2	Szeged FC	2 / 11	35
1932–33	1	Szeged FC	8 / 12	19
1933–34	1	Szeged FC	5 / 12	20
1934–35	1	Szeged FC	4 / 12	27
1935–36	1	Szeged FC	7 / 14	23
1936–37	1	Szeged FC	8 / 14	26
1937–38	1	Szeged FC	8 / 14	23
1938–39	1	Szeged FC	5 / 14	31
1939–40	1	Szeged FC	4 / 14	35
1940–41	1	Szegedi AK	3 / 14	32
1941–42	1	Szegedi AK	4 / 16	40
1942–43	1	Szegedi AK	15 / 16	19
1943–44	2	Szegedi AK	1 / 15	49
1944–45	1	Szegedi AK	10 / 16	3
1945	2	Szeged AK	1 / 12	20
1945–46	1	Szeged AK	4 / 10	17
1945–46	1	Szeged AK	3 / 14	37
1946–47	1	Szeged AK	9 / 16	29
1947–48	1	Szeged AK	12 / 17	24
1948–49	1	Szeged AK	14 / 16	19
1949–50	2	Szegedi Szakszervezeti MTE	1 / 16	47
1950	1	Szegedi SzMTE	12 / 16	12
1951	1	Szegedi Petőfi	14 / 14	10
1952	2	Szegedi Petőfi	2 / 18	49
1953	2	Szegedi Petőfi	6 / 16	30
1954	2	Szegedi Petőfi	16 / 16	17
1957	3	Szegedi AK	9 / 10	9
1957–58	4	Szegedi AK	3 / 16	45
1958–59	4	Szegedi AK	5 / 16	36
1959–60	4	Szegedi AK	11 / 17	25
1960–61	4	Szegedi AK	5 / 18	33
1961–62	4	Szegedi AK	13 / 16	24
1962–63	4	Szegedi AK	4 / 17	36
1963	5	Szegedi AK	8 / 18	19
1964	5	Szegedi AK	4 / 18	37
1965	5	Szegedi AK	4 / 17	39
1966	5	Szegedi AK	3 / 16	35
1967	4	Szegedi AK	5 / 16	31
1968	4	Szegedi AK	12 / 16	27
1969	4	Szegedi AK	12 / 16	26
1970	4	Szegedi AK	6 / 16	17
1970–71	4	Szegedi AK	3 / 16	37
1971–72	4	Szegedi AK	13 / 16	27
1972–73	4	Szegedi AK	10 / 16	28
1973–74	4	Szegedi AK	11 / 16	24
1974–75	4	Szegedi AK	3 / 16	41
1975–76	4	Szegedi AK	7 / 16	30
1976–77	1	Szegedi EOL AK	12 / 18	30
1977–78	1	Szegedi EOL AK	18 / 18	18
1978–79	2	Szegedi EOL AK	6 / 19	40
1979–80	2	Szegedi EOL AK	3 / 20	48
1980–81	2	Szegedi EOL AK	1 / 20	57
1981–82	1	Szegedi EOL AK	17 / 18	20
1982–83	2	Szegedi EOL AK	2 / 20	48
1983–84	1	Szegedi EOL AK	9 / 16	29
1984–85	1	Szegedi EOL AK	16 / 16	14
1985–86	2	Szegedi EOL Délép SE	3 / 20	51
1986–87	2	Szegedi EOL Délép SE	6 / 20	40
1987–88	2	Szeged SC	3 / 20	45
1988–89	2	Szeged SC	2 / 16	62
1989–90	2	Szeged SC	1 / 16	61
1990–91	1	Szeged SC	13 / 16	24
1991–92	2	Szeged SC	4 / 16	37
1992–93	2	Szeged SC	13 / 16	28
1993–94	2	Szeged FC	14 / 16	22
1994–95	3	Szeged FC	9 / 16	46
1995–96	3	Szegedi EAC	10 / 16	38
1996–97	3	Szegedi EAC	4 / 16	48
1997–98	3	Szegedi EAC	13 / 16	30
1998–99	2	Szeged LC	3 / 20	70
1998–99	3	Szegedi EAC	0 / 16	
1999–2000	1	Szeged LC	18 / 18	0
2000	3	FC Szeged	4 / 8	23
2000–01	4	FC Szeged	3 / 11	44
2001–02	3	FC Szeged	9 / 13	30
2002–03	3	FC Szeged	2 / 12	58
2002–03	3	FC Szeged	5 / 12	37
2003–04	2	FC Szeged	13 / 18	38
2004–05	2	FC Szeged	7 / 14	34
2005–06	-	-	-	-
2006–07	-	-	-	-
2007–08	-	-	-	-
2008–09	-	-	-	-
2009–10	-	-	-	-
2010–11	3	KITE-Szeged	2 / 15	55

== Notable players ==
- (Hungary) Géza Toldi

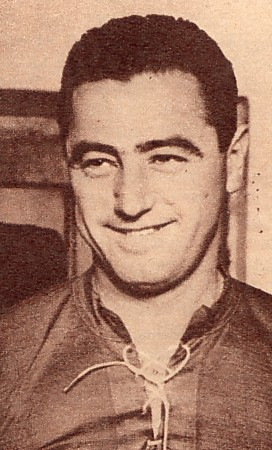
Géza Toldi played for the club between 1941 and 1942
