= List of Ferencvárosi TC seasons =

Ferencvárosi Torna Club is a Hungarian professional football club based in Ferencváros, Budapest. The club was formed in 1899 and played their first competitive match in the 1901 Nemzeti Bajnokság I.

== Key ==
Nemzeti Bajnokság I

- Pld = Matches played
- W = Matches won
- D = Matches drawn
- L = Matches lost
- GF = Goals for
- GA = Goals against
- Pts = Points
- Pos = Final position

Hungarian football league system

- NB I = Nemzeti Bajnokság I
- NB II = Nemzeti Bajnokság II
- NB III = Nemzeti Bajnokság III
- MB I = Megyei Bajnokság I

Magyar Kupa

- F = Final
- SF = Semi-finals
- QF = Quarter-finals
- R16 = Round of 16
- R32 = Round of 32
- R64 = Round of 64
- R128 = Round of 128

UEFA

- F = Final
- SF = Semi-finals
- QF = Quarter-finals
- Group = Group stage
- PO = Play-offs
- QR3 = Third qualifying round
- QR2 = Second qualifying round
- QR1 = First qualifying round
- PR = Preliminary round

Winners	Runners-up	Third	Promoted	Relegated

== Seasons ==
As of 27 August 2026.

Season	League										Cup	International		Manager	Ref.
Season	Tier	Div.	Pld	W	D	L	GF	GA	Pts.	Pos.	Cup	Competition	Result	Manager	Ref.
1901	1	NB I	8	3	1	4	20	28	7	3rd					
1902	1	NB I	8	4	1	3	14	13	9	2nd		Challenge Cup	R		
1903	1	NB I	14	10	1	3	51	11	21	1st		Challenge Cup	SF		
1904	1	NB I	16	11	2	3	48	16	24	2nd		No competitions held			
1905	1	NB I	16	11	4	1	54	12	26	1st		No competitions held		(Hungary) Kertész	
1906–07	1	NB I	14	11	2	1	70	20	24	1st		No competitions held			
1907–08	1	NB I	16	11	3	2	62	27	25	2nd		No competitions held			
1908–09	1	NB I	16	14	0	2	69	21	28	1st		Challenge Cup	W		
1909–10	1	NB I	16	13	1	2	57	17	27	1st	?				
1910–11	1	NB I	18	16	0	2	77	19	32	1st	?	Challenge Cup	R		
1911–12	1	NB I	18	14	2	2	74	17	30	1st	R	No competitions held			
1912–13	1	NB I	18	16	1	1	77	13	33	1st	W	No competitions held			
1913–14	1	NB I	18	13	1	4	61	28	27	2nd	?	No competitions held			
1916–17	1	NB I	22	11	4	7	29	23	26	4th		No competitions held			
1917–18	1	NB I	22	14	3	5	42	22	31	2nd		No competitions held			
1918–19	1	NB I	21	15	5	1	43	8	35	2nd		No competitions held			
1919–20	1	NB I	28	15	10	3	37	15	40	3rd		No competitions held			
1920–21	1	NB I	24	14	2	8	48	23	30	3rd		No competitions held			
1921–22	1	NB I	22	16	4	2	41	13	36	2nd	W	No competitions held			
1922–23	1	NB I	22	12	8	2	34	17	32	3rd	?	No competitions held			
1923–24	1	NB I	22	11	8	3	36	15	30	2nd		No competitions held			
1924–25	1	NB I	22	14	5	3	58	24	33	2nd	TBA	No competitions held			
1925–26	1	NB I	22	14	5	3	58	24	33	1st	TBA	No competitions held			
1926–27	1	NB I	18	13	4	1	51	18	30	1st	W	No competitions held		(Hungary) Tóth Potya	
1927–28	1	NB I	22	19	1	2	77	23	39	1st	W	No competitions held		(Hungary) Tóth Potya	
1928–29	1	NB I	22	16	4	2	79	20	36	2nd		Mitropa Cup	W	(Hungary) Tóth Potya	
1929–30	1	NB I	22	15	6	1	80	27	36	2nd	TBA	Did not qualify		(Hungary) Tóth Potya	
1930–31	1	NB I	22	12	5	5	60	28	29	3rd	R	Mitropa Cup	SF	(Hungary) Blum	
1931–32	1	NB I	22	22	0	0	105	18	44	1st	R	Did not qualify		(Hungary) Blum	
1932–33	1	NB I	22	16	3	3	80	22	35	3rd	W	Mitropa Cup	QF	(Hungary) Blum	
1933–34	1	NB I	22	19	1	2	89	31	39	1st	TBA	Did not qualify		(Hungary) Blum	
1934–35	1	NB I	22	14	5	3	72	32	33	2nd	W	Mitropa Cup	SF	(Hungary) Blum	
1935–36	1	NB I	26	19	1	6	103	46	39	3rd		Mitropa Cup	R	(Hungary) Blum	
1936–37	1	NB I	26	20	2	4	102	32	42	2nd		Mitropa Cup	W	(Hungary) Blum, (Hungary) Bródy	
1937–38	1	NB I	26	23	1	2	95	38	47	1st		Mitropa Cup	W	(Hungary) Sándor, (Hungary) Rauchmaul	
1938–39	1	NB I	26	19	5	2	121	44	43	2nd		Did not qualify		(Hungary) Dimény	
1939–40	1	NB I	26	19	1	6	77	31	39	1st		Mitropa Cup	R	(Hungary) Dimény	
1940–41	1	NB I	26	21	3	2	113	47	45	1st	TBA	Mitropa Cup	^{1}	(Hungary) Dimény	
1941–42	1	NB I	30	15	5	10	124	69	35	6th	W	Did not qualify		(Hungary) Dimény	
1942–43	1	NB I	30	15	6	9	84	51	36	3rd	W	Did not qualify		(Hungary) Dimény, (Hungary) Tóth Potya	
1943–44	1	NB I	30	16	4	10	71	46	36	2nd	W	Did not qualify		(Hungary) Schaffer	
1945	1	NB I	22	16	2	4	87	18	34	2nd		Did not qualify		(Hungary) Szabó, (Hungary) Urbancsik	
1945–46	1	NB I	18	6	4	8	39	41	16	5th^{2}		Did not qualify		(Hungary) Urbancsik	
1946–47	1	NB I	30	16	6	8	70	39	38	4th		Did not qualify		(Hungary) Dimény, (Hungary) Opata	
1947–48	1	NB I	32	23	4	5	77	39	50	3rd		Did not qualify		(Hungary) Lyka	
1948–49	1	NB I	30	26	1	3	140	36	53	1st		Did not qualify		(Hungary) Lyka	
1949–50	1	NB I	30	21	4	5	86	38	46	2nd		Did not qualify		(Hungary) Lyka	
1950	1	NB I	15	5	2	8	25	30	12	10th		Did not qualify		(Hungary) Vadas	
1951	1	NB I	26	13	3	10	43	42	29	6th	TBA	Did not qualify		(Hungary) Urbancsik	
1952	1	NB I	26	8	5	13	27	54	21	9th		Did not qualify		(Hungary) Deák	
1953	1	NB I	26	11	8	7	37	32	30	5th		Did not qualify		(Hungary) Sós	
1954	1	NB I	26	16	1	9	54	31	33	3rd		Did not qualify		(Hungary) Sós	
1955	1	NB I	26	15	7	4	64	27	37	3rd		Did not qualify		(Hungary) Sós	
1956	1	NB I	22	8	8	6	38	29	24	4th		Did not qualify		(Hungary) Sós	
1957	1	NB I	11	5	3	3	16	11	13	4th		Did not qualify		(Hungary) Csanádi	
1957–58	1	NB I	26	14	5	7	53	37	33	3rd	W	Did not qualify		(Hungary) Tátrai	
1958–59	1	NB I	26	10	8	8	37	37	28	7th		Did not qualify		(Hungary) Tátrai	
1959–60	1	NB I	26	14	4	5	56	31	35	2nd		Did not qualify		(Hungary) Tátrai	
1960–61	1	NB I	26	13	5	8	56	34	31	4th		Cup Winners' Cup	PR	(Hungary) Tátrai	
1961–62	1	NB I	26	13	7	6	45	26	33	3rd		Did not qualify		(Hungary) Mészáros	
1962–63	1	NB I	26	15	7	4	49	28	37	1st		Inter-Cities Fairs Cup	SF	(Hungary) Mészáros	
1963	1	NB I	13	7	3	3	15	9	17	3rd		European Cup	PR	(Hungary) Mészáros	
1964	1	NB I	26	19	3	4	58	27	41	1st		Inter-Cities Fairs Cup	W	(Hungary) Mészáros	
1965	1	NB I	26	14	8	4	66	31	36	2nd		European Cup	QF	(Hungary) Vilezsál	
1966	1	NB I	26	16	5	5	71	33	37	2nd	R	Inter-Cities Fairs Cup	3R	(Hungary) Tátrai	
1967	1	NB I	30	24	4	2	85	24	52	1st		Inter-Cities Fairs Cup	R	(Hungary) Lakat	
1968	1	NB I	30	21	7	2	65	26	49	1st		European Cup	1R	(Hungary) Lakat	
1969	1	NB I	30	15	9	6	56	33	39	3rd		European Cup	2R	(Hungary) Lakat	
1970	1	NB I	14	8	4	2	17	8	20	2nd^{3}		Inter-Cities Fairs Cup	1R	(Hungary) (Czechoslovakia) Kalocsay, (Hungary) Dalnoki	
1970–71	1	NB I	30	16	9	5	52	26	49	2nd		Did not qualify		(Hungary) Csanádi	
1971–72	1	NB I	30	14	8	8	59	36	36	5th^{4}	W	UEFA Cup	SF	(Hungary) Csanádi	
1972–73	1	NB I	30	17	7	6	60	31	41	2nd		Cup Winners' Cup	2R	(Hungary) Csanádi	
1973–74	1	NB I	30	15	9	6	54	29	39	2nd	W	UEFA Cup	1R	(Hungary) Novák, (Hungary) Dalnoki	
1974–75	1	NB I	28	10	13	5	45	29	33	3rd		Cup Winners' Cup	R	(Hungary) Dalnoki	
1975–76	1	NB I	30	20	6	4	65	38	46	1st	W	Did not qualify		(Hungary) Dalnoki	
1976–77	1	NB I	34	18	11	5	78	42	47	3rd	R	European Cup	2R	(Hungary) Dalnoki	
1977–78	1	NB I	34	11	12	11	54	51	34	9th	W	UEFA Cup	2R	(Hungary) Dalnoki	
1978–79	1	NB I	34	18	11	5	75	44	47	2nd	R	Cup Winners' Cup	2R	(Hungary) Friedmanszky	
1979–80	1	NB I	34	14	11	9	70	51	39	6th		UEFA Cup	1R	(Hungary) Friedmanszky	
1980–81	1	NB I	34	21	9	4	75	33	51	1st		Did not qualify		(Hungary) Novák	
1981–82	1	NB I	34	20	4	10	76	46	49	2nd		European Cup	1R	(Hungary) Novák	
1982–83	1	NB I	30	19	5	6	73	46	43	2nd		UEFA Cup	2R	(Hungary) Novák	
1983–84	1	NB I	30	9	9	12	43	44	27	12th		UEFA Cup	1R	(Hungary) Novák	
1984–85	1	NB I	30	11	6	13	34	38	28	13th		Intertoto Cup	G9	(Hungary) Vincze	
1985–86	1	NB I	30	12	10	8	35	29	34	5th	R	Did not qualify		(Hungary) Dalnoki	
1986–87	1	NB I	30	10	13	7	33	27	35	5th		Intertoto Cup	G11	(Hungary) Dalnoki	
1987–88	1	NB I	30	12	9	9	47	32	33	5th	R16	Did not qualify		(Hungary) Rákosi	
1988–89	1	NB I	30	16	7	7	49	29	59	2nd	R	Did not qualify		(Hungary) Rákosi	
1989–90	1	NB I	30	13	9	8	48	34	48	3rd	R16	Cup Winners' Cup	2R	(Hungary) Rákosi	
1990–91	1	NB I	30	15	10	5	47	22	40	2nd	W	UEFA Cup	2R	(Hungary) Nyilasi	
1991–92	1	NB I	30	18	10	2	61	19	46	1st	R16	Cup Winners' Cup	2R	(Hungary) Nyilasi	
1992–93	1	NB I	30	19	3	8	49	28	41	3rd	W	Champions League	1R	(Hungary) Nyilasi	
1993–94	1	NB I	30	16	5	9	50	32	37	4th	W	Cup Winners' Cup	1R	(Hungary) Nyilasi	
1994–95	1	NB I	30	17	8	5	62	41	59	1st	W	Cup Winners' Cup	2R	(Hungary) Novák	
1995–96	1	NB I	30	21	3	6	56	25	66	1st	QF	Champions League	GS	(Hungary) Novák	
1996–97	1	NB I	34	22	8	4	69	37	74	3rd	QF	Champions League	QR	(Hungary) Varga	
1997–98	1	NB I	34	20	7	7	63	43	67	2nd	R32	UEFA Cup	1R	(Hungary) Nyilasi	
1998–99	1	NB I	34	19	7	8	61	40	64	2nd	R16	UEFA Cup	2R	(Hungary) Nyilasi	
1999–00	1	NB I	32	14	8	10	61	39	50	5th	R16	UEFA Cup	1R	(Croatia) Vlak, (Croatia) Poklepovic	
2000–01	1	NB I	36	18	11	7	59	35	69	1st	R32	Did not qualify		(Hungary) Csank	
2001–02	1	NB I	38	21	6	11	66	39	69	2nd	R32	Champions League	2R	(Hungary) Garami	
2002–03	1	NB I	32	19	7	6	50	24	64	2nd	W	UEFA Cup	2R	(Hungary) Garami	
2003–04	1	NB I	32	16	9	7	44	30	57	1st	W	UEFA Cup	1R	(Hungary) Pintér	
2004–05	1	NB I	30	17	5	8	56	31	56	2nd	R	Champions League/UEFA Cup	3R, GS	(Romania) László	
2005–06	1	NB I ↓	30	10	11	9	48	38	41	6th	^{5}	UEFA Cup	1R	(Hungary) Gellei	
2006–07	2	NB II	30	18	11	1	70	21	65	2nd	QF	Did not qualify		(Hungary) Gellei, (Serbia) Kuntić	
2007–08	2	NB II	30	18	8	4	63	35	62	3rd	R16	Did not qualify		(Hungary) Csank	
2008–09	2	NB II ↑	30	25	3	2	94	22	78	1st	R16	Did not qualify		(England) Davison	
2009–10	1	NB I	30	10	11	9	34	35	41	7th	R16	Did not qualify		(England) Davison, (England) Short	
2010–11	1	NB I	30	15	5	10	50	43	50	3rd	R16	Did not qualify		(Hungary) Prukner	
2011–12	1	NB I	30	9	7	14	31	36	34	11th	R16	Europa League	2QR	(Hungary) Prukner, (Hungary) Détári	
2012–13	1	NB I	30	13	10	7	51	36	49	5th	R64	Did not qualify		(Hungary) Détári, (Netherlands) Moniz	
2013–14	1	NB I	30	17	6	7	47	33	57	3rd	R16	Did not qualify		(Netherlands) Moniz, ^{7} (Germany) Doll	
2014–15	1	NB I	30	19	7	4	49	19	64	2nd	W	Europa League	2QR	(Germany) Doll	
2015–16	1	NB I	33	24	4	5	69	23	76	1st	W	Europa League	2QR	(Germany) Doll	
2016–17	1	NB I	33	14	10	9	54	44	52	4th	W	Champions League	2QR	(Germany) Doll	
2017–18	1	NB I	33	18	12	3	69	31	66	2nd	R64	Europa League	2QR	(Germany) Doll	
2018–19	1	NB I	33	23	5	5	72	27	74	1st	QF	Europa League	1QR	(Germany) Doll, (Ukraine) Rebrov	
2019–20	1	NB I	33	23	7	3	58	24	76	1st	R64	Champions League/Europa League	3QR/GS	(Ukraine) Rebrov	
2020–21	1	NB I	33	23	9	1	69	22	78	1st	R16	Champions League	GS	(Ukraine) Rebrov	
2021–22	1	NB I	33	22	5	6	60	31	71	1st	W	Champions League/Europa League	4QR/GS	(Austria) Stöger, (Russia) Cherchesov	
2022–23	1	NB I	33	19	6	8	62	33	63	1st	R32	Champions League/Europa League	3QR/R16	(Russia) Cherchesov	
2023–24	1	NB I	33	23	5	5	80	30	74	1st	R	Champions League/Europa Conference League	1QR/R32	(Russia) Cherchesov, (Hungary) Máté (int.), (Serbia) Stanković, (Brazil) (Hungary) Leandro (int.)	
2024–25	1	NB I	33	20	9	4	64	31	69	1st	R	Champions League/Europa League	3QR/PO	(Netherlands) Jansen, (Republic of Ireland) Keane	
2025–26	1	NB I	33	21	5	7	67	31	68	2nd	W	Champions League/Europa League	PO/R16	(Republic of Ireland) Keane	
2026–27	1	NB I	3	1	1	1	3	4	4	10th	R64	Europa League	LP	(Slovakia) (Hungary) Borbély	

Notes

- Note 1: Ferencváros won the Western group of the 1945–46 season by having played 26 matches (22 won, 1 draw, 3 lost) gaining 45 points and was promoted to the best 10 teams where it finished 5th.
- Note 2: Ferencváros won the Group B of the 1970 spring season and lost to 4–3 on aggregate against Újpest
- Note 3: 2 points deducted.
- Note 4: Ferencváros did not receive license from the Hungarian Football Federation governed by István Kisteleki, therefore the club was relegated to the Hungarian League 2.
- Note 5: Ferencváros was banned from the Magyar Cup following incidents in 2004–05 Magyar Kupa Final.
- Note 6: Csaba Máté as interim coach for two 2013–14 Nemzeti Bajnokság I matches (Ferencváros 1–2 Pécs & Videoton 2–3 Ferencváros) and one 2013–14 Magyar Kupa match (Újpest 1–0 Ferencváros).
- Note 7: Ferencváros qualified for the final of the 1940 Mitropa Cup, but it was suspended due to the events of the World War II.
