= List of Ferencvárosi TC managers =

Ferencvárosi Torna Club is a Hungarian professional football club based in Ferencváros, Budapest.

== Managers ==
As of 5 November 2026.

Manager	Nationality	From	To	P	W	D	L	GF	GA	Win	Honours	Ref
Barney Gannon †	England	15 February 1914	14 June 1914	9								
Sándor Bródy †	Hungary	13 October 1920	10 July 1921	12	6	1	5	24	12			
János Kovács		1921		1	1	0	0	1	0			
Ottó Misángyi		1921		10	7	2	1	20	6			
Mihály Pataki † Zoltán Blum †	Hungary	16 July 1921	2 September 1922	11	8	2	1	20	7	79		
János Weibner †	Hungary	3 September 1922	14 November 1923	22	12	8	2	34	17			
Sándor Bródy				11	5	4	2	13	8			
János Kovács				11	6	4	1	23	7			
Sándor Bródy				18	10	6	2	35	22			
István Tóth-Potya †	Hungary	1 July 1925	30 June 1930	117	82	24	11	360	121			
Zoltán Blum †	Hungary	1 July 1930	30 June 1937	192	138	20	34	709	275	75		
Sándor Bródy †	Hungary	1 July 1937	30 September 1937	2	2	0	0	18	1			
József Sándor †	Hungary	1 October 1937	30 November 1937	7	6	1	0	32	9			
Emil Rauchmaul †	Hungary	1937	1938	26	23	1	2	95	38	70		
Ignác Amsel †	Hungary	1938										
György Hlavay †	Hungary	1938	1939	45	29	7	9	168	81	70		
Lajos Dimény †	Hungary	1939	1940	20	14	1	5	61	22		1939–40 NB I	
György Hlavay		1940		5	4	0	1	16	9			
István Tóth-Potya †	Hungary	1943										
Alfréd Schaffer †	Hungary	1 July 1943	30 June 1944	40	24	6	10	104	59	65		
Pál Szabó †	Hungary	1945		22	16	2	4	87	18	76		
István Mike †	Hungary	1945										
Gábor Urbancsik †	Hungary	1945	1946									
Lajos Dimény †	Hungary	1946	1947									
Zoltán Opata †	Hungary	1947		9	3	2	4	20	18	41		
Antal Lyka †	Hungary	1 July 1948	1 July 1950	60	47	5	8	226	74			
Miklós Vadas †	Hungary	1950		15	5	2	8	25	30	38		
Gábor Urbancsik †	Hungary	1951										
Ferenc Deák †	Hungary	1 January 1952	31 December 1952	28	8	6	14	29	57	36		
Károly Sós †	Hungary	1953	1956	106	55	24	27	233	125	59		
Árpád Csanádi †	Hungary	1957		26	14	5	7	50	32	60		
Sándor Tátrai †	Hungary	2 March 1958	1961									
József Mészáros †	Hungary	1 July 1961	31 December 1965	150	87	27	36	329	169	64		
Oszkár Vilezsál †	Hungary	1965		10	5	3	2	24	11	60		
Sándor Tátrai †	Hungary	1966										
Károly Lakat †	Hungary	1 January 1967	31 December 1969	122	77	24	21	277	127	70		
Géza Kalocsay †	Hungary (Czech Republic) Czechoslovakia	1 January 1970	31 December 1970	23	11	5	7	29	21	55		
Jenő Dalnoki †	Hungary	1970										
Ferenc Csanádi †	Hungary	1970	1973	112	58	28	26	223	123	60		
Dezső Novák †	Hungary	1 January 1973	30 June 1973									
Jenő Dalnoki †	Hungary	1973	1978									
Zoltán Friedmanszky †	Hungary	1978	1980	93	45	28	20	205	128	58		
Dezső Novák †	Hungary	1 July 1980	1 December 1983	8	2	2	4			25		
Géza Vincze †	Hungary	1984	1985	41	17	7	17	70	49	47		
Jenő Dalnoki †	Hungary	1985	1987									
Gyula Rákosi †	Hungary	1 January 1988	30 June 1990	98	47	24	27	164	105	56		
Tibor Nyilasi	Hungary	6 June 1990	30 June 1994	95	55	15	25			57.89		
Dezső Novák †	Hungary	1 July 1994	9 September 1996	78	47	14	17			60.25		
József Mucha (interim)	Hungary	6 September 1996	16 September 1996	2	1	1	0			50		
Zoltán Varga †	Hungary	13 September 1996	9 June 1997	30	20	7	3			66.67		
Tibor Nyilasi	Hungary	10 June 1997	17 December 1998	61	31	13	12			50.81		
Marijan Vlak	Croatia	1 January 1999	30 June 1999	16	11	1	4			68.75		
József Mucha (interim)	Hungary	14 June 1999	31 August 1999	7	2	2	3			28.57		
Stanko Poklepović	Croatia	1 September 1999	30 June 2000	30	14	8	9			46.67		
János Csank	Hungary	1 July 2000	11 December 2001	76	39	19	18			0	2000–01 NB I	
József Garami †	Hungary	1 July 2002	30 June 2003	59	33	15	11	91	47			
Attila Pintér	Hungary	23 December 2003	2 July 2004	7	4	3	0			57.14	2003–04 NB I 2003–04 MK	
Csaba László	Hungary Romania	1 July 2004	10 November 2005	72	32	18	22	112	84			
Imre Gellei	Hungary	10 November 2005	14 April 2007	19	8	7	4			42.1		
Zoran Kuntić	Serbia	16 April 2007	4 July 2007	9	4	5	0	21	7			
János Csank	Hungary	4 July 2007	17 April 2008	30	18	8	4					
Bobby Davison	England	17 April 2008	30 October 2009	11	2	4	5			18.18		
Craig Short	England	29 October 2009	25 May 2010	19	8	7	4			42.1		
László Prukner	Hungary	1 July 2010	16 August 2011	43	21	7	15			48.84		
Tamás Nagy (interim)	Hungary	16 August 2011	30 August 2011	4	0	0	4	3	10	0		
Lajos Détári	Hungary	30 August 2011	20 August 2012	34	11	10	13	45	41	42		
Ricardo Moniz	Netherlands	21 August 2012	2 December 2013	45	20	12	13			44.45		
Thomas Doll	Germany	19 December 2013	21 August 2018	190	113	44	33			59.47	1 Nemzeti Bajnokság I3 Magyar Kupa	
Serhii Rebrov	Ukraine	22 August 2018	4 June 2021	133	82	31	20	252	122	61.65	3 Nemzeti Bajnokság I	
Peter Stöger	Austria	1 July 2021	13 December 2021	31	18	2	11	69	33	58.06		
Stanislav Cherchesov	Russia	20 December 2021	19 July 2023	74	41	13	20	128	81	55.41	2021–22 NBI, 2021–22 MK, 2022–23 NBI	
Csaba Máté	Hungary	19 July 2023	1 September 2023	8	7	0	1	39	10	87.5	2023–24 NBI	
Dejan Stanković	Serbia	4 September 2023	16 May 2024	42	25	10	7	86	37	59.52	2023–24 NBI	
Leandro (caretaker)	Brazil; Hungary	17 May 2024	17 May 2024	1	1	0	0	2	0	100	2023–24 NBI	
Pascal Jansen	Netherlands	13 June 2024	31 December 2024	30	18	6	6	56	34	60	2024–25 NB I	
Robbie Keane	Republic of Ireland	6 January 2025	23 May 2026	82	52	14	16	186	94	63.41	2024–25 NB I, 2026 Magyar Kupa	
Balázs Borbély	Slovakia; Hungary	1 June 2026	present	25	17	7	1	58	19	68		
