= Sándor =

- Gender: masculine
- Language: Hungarian
- Name day: March 18

Other gender
- Feminine: Alexandra, Szandra

Origin
- Language: Greek
- Meaning: "Defender, protector of man"

Other names
- Variant form: Alex
- Nickname: Sanyi
- Cognate: Alexander
- Anglicisation: Alexander

Sándor (Hungarian pronunciation: [ˈʃaːndor]) is a Hungarian given name and surname. It is the Hungarian form of Alexander.

It may refer to:

== People ==
=== Given name ===
- Sándor Apponyi (1844–1925), Hungarian diplomat, bibliophile, bibliographer and book collector
- Sándor Boldogfai Farkas (1907–1970), Hungarian nobleman, sculptor, medalist
- Sándor Bródy (footballer) (1884–1944), Jewish-Hungarian soccer player
- Sándor Bródy (writer) (1863–1924)
- Sándor Csányi (banker) (born 1953), CEO of OTP Bank Group
- Sándor Csányi (actor) (born 1975), Hungarian actor
- Sandor Earl (born 1989), New Zealand born rugby league player
- Sándor Erdős (born 1947), Hungarian Olympic champion épée fencer
- Sándor Fábry (born 1953), Hungarian comedian, talk show host, and writer
- Sándor Farkas de Boldogfa (1880–1946), Hungarian nobleman and colonel
- Sándor Fazekas (born 1963), Hungarian jurist and politician
- Sándor Ferenczi (1873–1933), Hungarian psychoanalyst
- Sándor Garbai (1879–1947), Hungarian socialist politician
- Sándor Gáspár (politician) (1917–2002), Hungarian communist politician and trade unionist
- Sándor Gáspár (actor) (born 1956), Hungarian actor
- Sándor Gellér (1925–1996), Hungarian Olympic champion soccer goalkeeper
- Sándor Gombos (1895–1968), Hungarian Olympic champion saber fencer
- Sándor Károlyi (1668–1743), Hungarian aristocrat, statesman and Imperial Feldmarschall
- Sándor Keresztes (1919–2013), Hungarian diplomat and jurist
- Sándor Kocsis (1929–1979), Hungarian footballer
- Sándor Kónya (1923–2002), Hungarian operatic tenor
- Shaolin Sándor Liu (born 1995), Hungarian Olympic champion short track speed skater
- Sandor Martin (born 1993), Spanish boxer
- Sándor Márai (1900–1989), Hungarian poet, novelist, and journalist
- Sándor Mogyorós (1911–1969), Romanian Communist politician and activist of Hungarian ethnicity (also known as Alexandru Moghioroș)
- Sándor Noszály (born 1972), Hungarian tennis player
- Sándor Petőfi (1823–1849), Hungarian poet and liberal revolutionary
- Sándor Puhl (1955–2021), Hungarian football referee
- Sándor Radó (1899–1981), Hungarian cartographer and a Soviet military intelligence agent
- Sándor Radó (actor) (1891–1944), Hungarian actor
- Sándor Rott (1868–1942), Hungarian actor
- Sándor Simonyi-Semadam (1864–1946), Hungarian politician
- Sándor Tátrai (1914–1970), Hungarian footballer and manager
- Sándor Tarics (1913–2016), Hungarian water polo player who won a gold medal in the 1936 Summer Olympics
- Sándor Végh (1912–1997), Hungarian/French violinist
- Sándor Weöres (1913–1989), Hungarian poet and author

=== Surname ===
- Sándor (surname)

== Fictional characters ==
- Sandor Clegane, nicknamed The Hound, in the fantasy series A Song of Ice and Fire and its television adaptation, Game of Thrones
- Emperor Sandor, a recurring character of the Tara Duncan book series
- Sandor, in the book series Lorien Legacies by Pittacus Lore
- Sandor, in the animated TV series Star Blazers
