= 1935–36 Nemzeti Bajnokság II =

Nemzeti Bajnokság II
- Season: 1935–36
- Champions: Nemzeti SC
- Promoted: Nemzeti SC

The 1935–36 Nemzeti Bajnokság II season was the 36th edition of the Nemzeti Bajnokság II.

== League table ==
Pos	Team	Pld	W	D	L	GF	GA	GD	Pts	Promotion or relegation
1	Nemzeti SC	26	24	1	1	142	22	+120	49	Promotion to Nemzeti Bajnokság I
2	Somogy-Baranya FC	26	18	1	7	66	48	+18	37	Relegation
3	Csepel FC	26	16	4	6	83	49	+34	36	
4	VAC FC	26	14	4	8	60	45	+15	32	
5	Alba Regia AK	26	13	5	8	82	71	+11	31	
6	Szürketaxi FC	26	12	4	10	67	55	+12	28	
7	Droguisták FC	26	9	9	8	58	69	−11	27	
8	Vasas FC	26	11	5	10	63	83	−20	27	
9	Erzsébet FC	26	7	9	10	52	54	−2	23	
10	Nagytétény FC	26	8	4	14	44	80	−36	20	
11	Millenáris FC	26	6	2	18	40	102	−62	14	Relegation
12	Lóden FC (Note: Started as Budatétény FC, in February 1936 merged with Lóden Posztógyár.)	26	5	3	18	37	93	−56	13	
13	Váci Reménység FC	26	3	6	17	37	85	−48	12	
14	Zugló FC (Note: Withdrew)	26	6	3	17	52	27	+25	15	

== See also ==
- 1935–36 Nemzeti Bajnokság I
