= List of Szombathelyi Haladás managers =

Szombathelyi Haladás is a professional football club based in Szombathely, Hungary.

== Managers ==
As of 15 May 2025.

Manager	Nationality	From	To	P	W	D	L	GF	GA	Win	Honours	Notes
Miklós Dobóczky †	Hungary	1936										
Ágoston Morvay †	Hungary	1937										
József Dénes †	Hungary	1937	1938									
József Marth †	Hungary	1938										
Rezső Lyka†	Hungary	1939	1941									
József Marth †	Hungary	1941	1947									
Károly Sós †	Hungary	1947	1948									
Mihály Bencsik †	Hungary	1948										
Károly Sós †	Hungary	1948	1950									
Imre Hermann †	Hungary	1950										
Jenő Kiss †	Hungary	0951										
Iuliu Bodola †	Romania	1951	1953									
Gábor Urbancsik †	Hungary	1954										
Gyula Körmendi †	Hungary	1954	1955									
Béla Volentik †	Hungary	1955	1956									
Péter Szabó †	Hungary	1956										
Gyula Szűcs †	Hungary	1957										
Gábor Kiss	Hungary	1957	1958									
Imre Szabó	Hungary	1959										
András Turay	Hungary	1959	1960									
Gyuka Gazdag	Hungary	1961										
József Tölgyesi	Hungary	1961	1962									
Pál Jávor	Hungary	1963	1964									
Tibor Kemény	Hungary	1965										
Emil Szőllősi	Hungary	1965	1966									
Ferenc Veleckei	Hungary	1966										
József Albert	Hungary	1966										
Sándor Tátrai	Hungary	1967	1968									
József Albert	Hungary	1969										
Alfréd Fehérvári	Hungary	1970	1972									
Tibor Palicskó	Hungary	1972	1973									
Antal Thomann	Hungary	1973	1974									
László Sárosi	Hungary	1974	1979									
László Rátkai	Hungary	1979	1980									
Tibor Palicskó	Hungary	1980	1981									
Péter Török	Hungary	1981	1984									
László Rátkai	Hungary	1984	1987									
Dezső Novák	Hungary	1 July 1987	30 June 1988									
Ferenc Gunyhó	Hungary	1989	1990									
László Sárosi	Hungary	1990	1991									
Péter Török	Hungary	1991	1992									
Róbert Glázer	Hungary	1992	1994									
Sándor Fedor	Hungary	1994										
Mihály Nagy	Hungary	1995										
István Mihalecz	Hungary	1995	1998									
István Varga	Hungary	1998										
László Dajka	Hungary	1998										
István Mihalecz (2nd spell)	Hungary	1998	1999									
Géza Vincze	Hungary	1999	2000									
Ferenc Keszei	Hungary	2000	2001									
Lázár Szentes	Hungary	3 January 2002	11 June 2002									
Róbert Glázer	Hungary	20 June 2002	24 April 2003									
Lajos Détári	Hungary	29 March 2003	26 June 2003									
Sándor Gujdár	Hungary	2003										
Péter Bozsik	Hungary	2003	2004									
Bálint Tóth	Hungary	2004										
István Mihalecz (3rd spell)	Hungary	2004	2005									
Tamás Artner	Hungary	8 July 2005	21 June 2007									
Aurél Csertői	Hungary	21 June 2007	15 September 2009									
Antal Róth	Hungary	16 September 2009	23 July 2010									
Aurél Csertői (2nd spell)	Hungary	23 July 2010	16 October 2010									
Zoltán Aczél	Hungary	16 October 2010	14 December 2011									
Tamás Artner	Hungary	19 December 2011	17 October 2014									
Lázár Szentes	Hungary	17 October 2014	20 April 2015									
Attila Kuttor	Hungary	21 April 2015	5 May 2015									
Géza Mészöly	Hungary	9 May 2015	29 August 2017	83	32	19	32	103	115			
Bálint Pacsi	Hungary	30 August 2017	12 November 2017									
Michal Hipp	Slovakia	13 November 2017	19 September 2018	26	9	5	12	33	38			
Ferenc Horváth	Hungary	27 September 2018	30 June 2019	29	9	5	15	28	38			
Attila Supka	Hungary	11 July 2019	29 October 2019	14	3	6	5	19	20			
Szilárd Desits (caretaker)	Hungary	30 October 2019	29 December 2019	9	3	0	6	8	12			
János Mátyus	Hungary	30 December 2019	31 May 2021	51	22	15	14	71	48			
Szabolcs Németh	Hungary	4 June 2021										
Géza Mészöly (caretaker)		10 September 2022	19 September 2022	2	1	1	0	4	2			
Michal Hipp	Slovakia	20 September 2022	30 June 2023	31	12	6	13	49	50			
Aleksandar Jović	Serbia	12 June 2023	6 May 2024	33	10	11	12	44	49			
Ferenc Vígh	Hungary	11 January 2025										
