= 1936–37 Nemzeti Bajnokság II =

Nemzeti Bajnokság II
- Season: 1936–37
- Champions: Szürketaxi FC
- Promoted: Szürketaxi FC

The 1936–37 Nemzeti Bajnokság II season was the 37th edition of the Nemzeti Bajnokság II.

== League table ==
Pos	Team	Pld	W	D	L	GF	GA	GD	Pts	Promotion or relegation
1	Szürketaxi FC	22	21	0	1	105	25	+80	42	Promotion to Nemzeti Bajnokság I
2	Csepel FC	22	15	4	3	88	33	+55	34	
3	Alba Regia AK	22	16	1	5	76	33	+43	33	
4	Salgótarjáni BTC	22	15	3	4	57	32	+25	33	
5	Lóden FC	22	11	2	9	52	49	+3	24	Relegation
6	Erzsébet FC	22	8	6	8	47	53	−6	22	
7	Vasas FC	22	7	6	9	46	65	−19	20	
8	VAC FC	22	8	2	12	41	54	−13	18	
9	Váci Reménység	22	4	4	14	41	84	−43	12	
10	Droguisták FC	22	4	4	14	30	74	−44	12	
11	Nagytétény FC	22	3	4	15	26	77	−51	10	Relegation
12	Zugló FC (Note: Withdrew)	22	1	2	19	17	47	−30	4	Relegation

== See also ==
- 1936–37 Nemzeti Bajnokság I
