= 1932–33 Nemzeti Bajnokság II =

Nemzeti Bajnokság II
- Season: 1932–33
- Champions: Phöbus FC
- Promoted: Phöbus FC

The 1932–33 Nemzeti Bajnokság II season was the 33rd edition of the Nemzeti Bajnokság II.

== League table ==
Pos	Team	Pld	W	D	L	GF	GA	GD	Pts	Promotion
1	Phőbus FC	26	21	5	0	84	15	+69	47	Promotion to Nemzeti Bajnokság I
2	Vasas FC	26	22	2	2	85	19	+66	46	
3	Szürketaxi FC	26	17	5	4	62	17	+45	39	
4	BAK TK	26	16	2	8	61	41	+20	34	
5	Erzsébeti TC FC	26	14	4	8	47	41	+6	32	
6	Szentlőrinci NFC	26	13	5	8	75	38	+37	29 (Note: 2 points deducted?)	
7	VAC FC	26	11	5	10	44	59	−15	27	
8	Csepel FC	26	11	3	12	40	64	−24	25	
9	Budafok FC	26	12	0	14	46	69	−23	24	
10	Drasche FC	26	9	5	12	35	53	−18	23	
11	Droguisták FC	26	8	2	16	30	75	−45	18	
12	Shell FC	26	4	2	20	13	37	−24	10	
13	Rákospalotai FC	26	1	0	25	1	89	−88	2	
14	Bőrösök FC	26	0	0	26	2	8	−6	0	

== See also ==
- 1932–33 Magyar Kupa
- 1932–33 Nemzeti Bajnokság I
