= 1930–31 Nemzeti Bajnokság II =

Nemzeti Bajnokság II
- Season: 1930–31
- Champions: Somogy FC
- Promoted: Somogy FC; Miskolci AK

The 1930–31 Nemzeti Bajnokság II season was the 31st edition of the Nemzeti Bajnokság II.

== League table ==
Pos	Team	Pld	W	D	L	GF	GA	GD	Pts	Promotion
1	Somogy FC	22	18	2	2	108	20	+88	38	Promotion to Nemzeti Bajnokság I
2	Attila FC	22	18	1	3	79	12	+67	37	Promotion to Nemzeti Bajnokság I
3	VAC FC	22	16	2	4	66	32	+34	34	
4	Turul FC	22	15	2	5	85	32	+53	32	
5	Soroksári FC	22	14	1	7	49	30	+19	29	
6	BAK TK	22	10	2	10	57	50	+7	22	
7	Maglód „1930” FC	22	8	5	9	40	51	−11	21	
8	Terézváros FC	22	6	2	14	35	84	−49	14	
9	Kossuth FC (Pesterzsébet) (Note: Permanently disbanded after the championship.)	22	5	2	15	25	48	−23	12	
10	Megyer FC	22	5	1	16	33	86	−53	11	
11	Józsefváros FC (Note: Merged with Terézváros FC on 26 August 1931.)	22	4	1	17	27	101	−74	9	
12	Rákospalotai FC (Note: Did not play in the last 3 matches after the 12:0 defeat to Turul FC.)	22	2	1	19	17	75	−58	5	

== See also ==
- 1930–31 Magyar Kupa
- 1930–31 Nemzeti Bajnokság I
