= 1926–27 Nemzeti Bajnokság II =

Nemzeti Bajnokság II
- Season: 1926–27
- Champions: Miskolci AK
- Promoted: Miskolci AK; Bocskai FC

The 1926–27 Nemzeti Bajnokság II season was the 27th edition of the Nemzeti Bajnokság II.

== League table ==
Pos	Team	Pld	W	D	L	GF	GA	GD	Pts	Promotion
1	Miskolci AK	26	18	7	1	64	28	+36	43	Promotion to Nemzeti Bajnokság I
2	Bocskai LSz (Note: On 16 October 1927, the football department was established.)	26	17	5	4	83	44	+39	39	Promotion to Nemzeti Bajnokság I
3	Budapesti AK FC	26	15	7	4	76	45	+31	37	
4	Turul FC	26	14	6	6	53	29	+24	34	
5	Somogy FC	26	12	9	5	56	26	+30	33	
6	Rákospalotai FC	26	14	3	9	51	40	+11	31	
7	Soroksári FC	26	13	3	10	68	49	+19	29	
8	Pesterzsébet LSZ (Note: New name: Pesterzsébet Football Club.)	26	8	9	9	38	35	+3	25	
9	Húsos FC	26	9	7	10	43	55	−12	25	
10	Erzsébetvárosi SK	26	4	12	10	38	60	−22	20	
11	Kossuth FC	26	5	4	17	39	70	−31	14	
12	Városi AC (Note: New name: VAC Football Club.)	26	3	6	17	32	72	−40	12	
13	Órások FC	26	3	5	18	36	62	−26	11	
14	Terézváros FC	26	5	1	20	28	90	−62	11	

== Promotion playoff ==
Semi-finals
	First leg	Second leg	
Budai 33 FC	2–1 (1–1)	0–0	Bocskay FC
Budapesti AK	3–1 (2–0)	2–2 (0–0)	Turul FC
Final
Bocskay FC	5–0		Budapesti AK

== See also ==
- 1926–27 Magyar Kupa
- 1926–27 Nemzeti Bajnokság I
