= 1928–29 Nemzeti Bajnokság II =

Nemzeti Bajnokság II
- Season: 1928–29
- Champions: Pécs-Baranya FC
- Promoted: Pécs-Baranya FC; Miskolci AK

The 1928–29 Nemzeti Bajnokság II season was the 29th edition of the Nemzeti Bajnokság II.

== League table ==
Pos	Team	Pld	W	D	L	GF	GA	GD	Pts	Promotion
1	Pécs-Baranya FC	22	19	1	2	66	29	+37	39	Promotion to Nemzeti Bajnokság I
2	Miskolci Attila Kör	22	18	1	3	78	13	+65	37	
3	Rákospalotai FC	22	13	4	5	61	46	+15	30	
4	Zala-Kanizsa FC	22	12	4	6	50	38	+12	28	
5	Turul FC	22	11	5	6	49	34	+15	27	
6	Pesterzsébeti Húsos FC	22	9	4	9	47	46	+1	22	
7	Józsefváros FC	22	9	4	9	46	49	−3	22	
8	Soroksári FC	22	5	4	13	41	55	−14	14	
9	Erzsébetvárosi SK	22	5	4	13	29	48	−19	14	
10	Budapesti AK TK	22	3	6	13	26	51	−25	12	
11	Terézváros FC	22	3	4	15	30	62	−32	10	
12	VAC FC	22	3	3	16	23	75	−52	9	

== See also ==
- 1928–29 Nemzeti Bajnokság I
