= 1908–09 Nemzeti Bajnokság II =

Nemzeti Bajnokság II
- Season: 1908–09
- Champions: Ferencváros Gymnastics Club
- All statistics correct as of 26 January 2022.

The 1908–09 Nemzeti Bajnokság II season was the 9th edition of the Nemzeti Bajnokság II, the second tier of the Hungarian football league system.

== Rural districts ==
=== Western District ===
Pos	Team	Pld	W	D	L	GF	GA	GD	Pts
1	Egyetértés TO	8	7	1	0	43	5	+38	15
2	Pozsonyi TE	7	5	1	1	38	7	+31	11
3	Pozsonyi Újvárosi LE	7	2	1	4	3	20	−17	5
4	Soproni FAC	8	2	0	6	20	10	+10	4
5	Pozsonyi Terézvárosi FC	8	1	1	6	1	63	−62	3

=== Northern District ===
Pos	Team	Pld	W	D	L	GF	GA	GD	Pts
1	Kassai AC	4	4	0	0	24	0	+24	8
2	Kassai MTE	4	2	0	2	0	24	−24	4
3	Sóvári TE (Note: Withdrew before the first match)	4	0	0	4	0	0	0	0

=== Southern District ===
Pos	Team	Pld	W	D	L	GF	GA	GD	Pts
1	Bacska Subotica AC	8	8	0	0	13	6	+7	16
2	Szegedi AK	8	6	0	2	9	7	+2	12
3	Aradi AC	8	3	0	5	6	3	+3	6
4	Aradi Postások SE	8	3	0	5	2	14	−12	6
5	Kaposvár AC (Note: Withdrew before the first match)	0	0	0	0	0	0	0	0

=== Eastern District ===
Pos	Team	Pld	W	D	L	GF	GA	GD	Pts
1	Kolozsvári KASK	8	7	1	0	13	6	+7	15
2	Kolozsvári AC	8	5	1	2	16	12	+4	11
3	Kolozsvári Vasutas SC	8	4	1	3	4	11	−7	9
4	Marosvásárhelyi SE (Note: Withdrew)	8	2	0	6	1	5	−4	4
5	Cluj FC (Note: Withdrew before the first match)	8	0	0	8	0	0	0	0

== Urban Second League ==
Pos	Team	Pld	W	D	L	GF	GA	GD	Pts
1	Nemzeti SC	16	15	0	1	38	9	+29	30
2	33 FC	16	12	1	3	36	16	+20	25
3	Postások SE	16	10	2	4	23	11	+12	22
4	Újpest-Rákospalotai AK	16	8	2	6	39	22	+17	18
5	Műegyetemi AFC	16	7	1	8	20	32	−12	15
6	Kereskedelmi Alkalmazottak OE	16	5	3	8	15	29	−14	13
7	III. Kerületi TVE	16	6	1	9	12	35	−23	13
8	Kőbánya TE (Note: Withdrew after the autumn rounds)	16	4	0	12	19	43	−24	8
9	Tisztviselők LE (Note: Withdrew, Lipótváros Tournament Club considered successor.)	0	0	0	0	0	0	0	0

== For the title of "best rural team" ==
This year, for the first time, the championship team of the four rural districts took part in the tournament for the title of "Best Rural Team" at the MAC Margaret Island course in Budapest.

Semi-final:

Košice Athletic Club – Cluj-Napoca Commercial Academy Sports Circle 7–0

Bácska Subotica AC – Győr Understanding Gymnastics Division(Gyor ETO) 0–0, 0–5

Final:

Košice Athletics Club – Győr Understanding Tournament Division 3–2

== National championship final ==
Due to the summer football ban, the first national championship final between the Kassai AC and the Budapest championship team took place on October 3.

Ferencváros Gymnastics Club - Kassai Athletics Club 11–0

The match showed a very unequal balance of power and showed the gap between capital and rural football at the time.
