= 1927–28 Nemzeti Bajnokság II =

Nemzeti Bajnokság II
- Season: 1927–28
- Champions: Somogy FC
- Promoted: Somogy FC

The 1927–28 Nemzeti Bajnokság II season was the 28th edition of the Nemzeti Bajnokság II.

== League table ==
Pos	Team	Pld	W	D	L	GF	GA	GD	Pts	Promotion
1	Somogy FC	22	15	5	2	59	21	+38	35	Promotion to Nemzeti Bajnokság I
2	Turul FC	22	15	4	3	53	13	+40	34	
3	Pesterzsébeti FSz	22	16	2	4	77	23	+54	34	
4	Soroksári FC	22	12	2	8	41	31	+10	26	
5	Rákospalotai FC	22	11	2	9	54	26	+28	24	
6	Húsos FC	22	11	2	9	30	29	+1	24	
7	Budapesti AK FC	22	10	3	9	37	40	−3	23	
8	Kossuth FC (Pesterzsébet)	22	8	5	9	40	51	−11	21	
9	Erzsébetvárosi SK	22	7	5	10	29	56	−27	19	
10	VAC FC	22	4	1	17	30	66	−36	9	
11	Terézváros FC	22	4	0	18	29	79	−50	8	
12	Órás FC	22	3	1	18	26	70	−44	7	

== See also ==
- 1927–28 Magyar Kupa
- 1927–28 Nemzeti Bajnokság I
