= Pécs-Baranya FC =

Hungarian football club

- Full name: Pécs-Baranya Futball Club
- Founded: 1926
- Ground: Tüzér utcai stadion
- Capacity: 3,000
Home colours

Pécs-Baranya Futball Club was a Hungarian football club from the town of Pécs, Hungary.

== History ==
Although Pécs had a vibrant soccer scene a century ago, the local professional team was not immediately formed in this major city of Transdanubia when professional soccer was introduced. “The main reason was the belief that professional sports would kill amateur sports, which were already struggling with heavy debts,” wrote Nemzeti Sport in its March 30, 1927, issue, which also reported that Pécsi SC (the workers’ team) and Pécsi AC had finally decided to make the leap after a long series of negotiations. The professional movement was led by Károly Kristóf and Gyula Déri. Shares were slowly being acquired, and in the meantime, the possibility arose that another professional team might be formed under the name Pannónia FC.

In the end, only one team was organized, and the new club held its inaugural general meeting on July 3, 1927, at the Pannónia Hotel. The team’s name sparked the most debate; in the end, they decided on Pécs-Baranya FC. Choosing the colors was easier; the county’s blue and red were accepted unanimously. An interesting addition to the bylaws was that the new club would not abandon the two amateur teams; at least 1,500 pengő had to be allocated annually to the PSC and the PAC. (This would play an important role later on.)

With the administrative hurdles out of the way, all that remained was to assemble the team. On August 16, Pécs-Baranya FC made its debut at the modern sports complex on Tüzér Street, playing to a 2–2 draw against Buda II. District FC. “Even if it did not fully satisfy the audience, it nevertheless dispelled all the skeptics’ concerns regarding its future performance,” summarized Dunántúl.

Since by the summer of 1927, numerous teams from the capital and the provinces had decided to turn professional, the organizing Professional Footballers’ Association (PLASZ) announced the II. B. Division league championship, which constituted the third tier. However, the necessary financial backing was not always available, and several clubs withdrew during the season. The Pécs team really came together by spring, but heading into the final round, the Kanizsa team still led on goal difference. In the final round, Józsefváros earned a point in Nagykanizsa, while Pécs-Baranya defeated Csaba FC, thus securing the championship title for Baranya.

“Seeing the collapse of certain professional teams, the leaders of the Pécs professional club are striving to establish a sound foundation by cutting overhead costs. Consequently, they are restructuring the team with local players wherever possible, while offering positions to players from the capital who have already settled in Pécs, thereby partially relieving the cooperative of its financial burden. “A new generation of young players has developed in Pécs,” explained Sporthírlap, highlighting the reason for the team’s strong performance.

A year later, they had even more reason to celebrate in Baranya, as the team battled Miskolc’s Attila for the championship title, with the fate of the gold medal decided in Pécs. There was enormous interest in the match; tickets could even be purchased from the conductors on the Pécs tram. In the pouring rain, seven to eight thousand people crowded into Tüzér Street.

Before kickoff, City Councilman Lajos Sebestyén addressed the players. He stated that 70,000 people in Pécs were watching the match, and that the team represented the city's sporting tradition against representatives from Miskolc. He called on the players to conclude their season, which had included a series of successes, with a victory and the championship title.

A reporter from Dunántúl described the atmosphere of the match: “A life-and-death struggle raged on the field. As a result of the unparalleled intensity and determination of the play, players fell like soldiers on a battlefield. After the clashes, sometimes a Miskolc player, sometimes a Pécs player collapsed lifelessly to the ground; these injuries were accompanied by the screams of the more faint-hearted spectators—especially the women—and the booing of the men.” In the dramatic match, the decisive goal came in the final minutes: Pécs won 3–2, and the crowd rushed onto the field to celebrate the championship title and promotion.

Pécs-Baranya FC debuted in the 1929–30 season of the Hungarian League and finished ninth.

Attila’s team refused to accept the defeat and filed a complaint against István Dóra, claiming that the Pécs player had deliberately kicked Müller, who was left staggering on the field and thus allowed the opposing team to score the final goal. Attila informed Nemzeti Sport that the goalkeeper had to be taken to the hospital after the match, where it was determined that he had heart valve problems and likely also had a broken rib. The Pécs team claimed this was slander and filed a complaint against Attila’s vice president, József Róth.

By the summer of 1929, Pécs was already preparing to take on the top-tier teams and the leading Hungarian clubs. They had to wait until November 10 for their first victory, when Nemzeti SC lost 3–0 at Tüzér Street. Two weeks later, Pécs snatched a point from Ferencváros’s home ground (Fradi equalized in the 87th minute to make it 2–2), but the team really came together by spring. At home, they beat Bástya and Attila; on the road, they defeated Somogy FC; and after a draw away against Ferencváros, they finished 4-4 at home.

FTC had a 3-0 lead during the game up until the 22nd minute; however, Pécs-Baranya managed to level things at half-time. After the game, the manager and playing member, József Kautzky, stated that he was happy with the results, but he was concerned about the possible effects it would have on their chances of winning the championship for Ferencváros. In the end, Ferencváros came second, just two points behind Újpest, who were the champions.

As a newcomer, Pécs-Baranya finished in 9th place and began the following 1930–1931 season with a victory, while Nemzeti SC lost 3–2 at Mecsekalja. The team, fighting to stay in the league, failed to win several key matches in the spring; they needed to collect three more points to extend their top-flight membership, but they were unable to do so.

The blue-and-reds were broken, and from there they went into a rapid decline. As early as the fall of 1931, the team’s financial situation collapsed, a situation further complicated by a transfer dispute and an incident involving stone-throwing. During the Pécs–Szeged match, one of the visiting players was hit by a stone, prompting the Hungarian Football Association (PLSZ) to ban the team from playing four home games in another city and deduct points from their record. The club tried to do everything it could; in April 1932, for example, it reduced ticket prices by twenty percent, and children under 120 centimeters tall didn’t even have to buy a ticket.

On May 5, 1932, however, the *Dunántúl* reported that the PLASZ executive committee had recommended the expulsion of Pécs-Baranya because the team had played several matches while its eligibility was suspended. The team’s management informed the newspaper that Baranya’s suspension was unlawful, as an agreement had been reached regarding how the club would settle its debt to Pécsi SC with the involvement of the deputy mayor; however, the amateur team denied this. “Pécs SC denied the agreement it had reached with Mayor István Makay, in his capacity as chairman of the Pécs-Baranya board—an agreement that had already been implemented—because he openly declared: ‘Pécs-Baranya must be shut down!’” —the newspaper quoted the statement.

By that point, Pécs-Baranya had already paid the amateur team more than five thousand pengő. The professional club tried in vain to appeal; on May 22, 1932, Dunántúl reported that “the appeals committee had definitively disqualified the Pécs professional team due to its ‘debt’ to PSC.”

Professional soccer in Pécs was thus brought down by internal strife. Three years later, the city was given a lifeline: Somogy FC moved to Baranya in April 1936 and finished the season there. The club, renamed Mecsek FC, planned to start the next season under that name; for example, that summer it played a match under floodlights against Phöbus FC—a first in the history of rural soccer, but this arrangement proved unviable.

It’s an interesting coincidence, but today the “workers’ team,” Pécsi Mecsek FC, is battling the team from Nagykanizsa for promotion from the third division. Currently, the team from Nagykanizsa is ahead by two points, but there is still one round left to play.

== Name Changes ==
- 1926–1935: Pécs-Baranya FC
- 1935: merger with Somogy FC

== Honours ==
- Nemzeti Bajnokság II:
  - Winners (1): 1928–29
