= Sándor (surname) =

Sándor is a surname, and may refer to:

- Béla Sándor (1919–1978), Hungarian chess International Master
- György Sándor (1912–2005), Hungarian pianist and writer
- György Sándor (footballer) (born 1984), Hungarian footballer
- István Sándor (disambiguation)
- János Sándor (1860–1922), Hungarian politician
- Judit Sándor lawyer, bioethicist and author
- Károly Sándor (1928–2014), Hungarian footballer
- Pál Sándor (born 1939), Hungarian film director, producer and screenwriter
- Renáta Sándor (born 1990), Hungarian volleyball player
- Tamás Sándor (born 1974), Hungarian footballer and manager
