= 1933–34 Nemzeti Bajnokság I =

Annual Hungarian soccer tournament

Nemzeti Bajnokság I
- Season: 1933–34
- Champions: Ferencvárosi TC
- Relegated: Nemzeti SC

Statistics of Nemzeti Bajnokság I in the 1933–34 season.

== Overview ==
It was contested by 12 teams, and Ferencvárosi TC won the championship.

== League standings ==
Pos	Team	Pld	W	D	L	GF	GA	GR	Pts
1	Ferencvárosi TC	22	19	1	2	89	31	2.871	39
2	Újpest FC	22	16	5	1	68	25	2.720	37
3	Bocskai FC	22	12	3	7	52	32	1.625	27
4	MTK Hungária FC	22	12	2	8	62	41	1.512	26
5	Szeged FC	22	9	2	11	40	45	0.889	20
6	Kispest AC	22	7	5	10	43	50	0.860	19
7	Budai 11	22	6	7	9	37	54	0.685	19
8	Phöbus FC	22	6	6	10	42	50	0.840	18
9	III. Kerületi TUE	22	7	4	11	41	57	0.719	18
10	Miskolci Attila	22	6	3	13	32	47	0.681	15
11	Somogy FC	22	6	2	14	30	77	0.390	14
12	Nemzeti SC	22	2	8	12	31	58	0.534	12

Source: rsssf.com

== Results ==
Home \ Away	KER	BOC	B11	FTC	HUN	KIS	MIS	NEM	PHÖ	SOM	SZE	ÚJP
III. Kerület		2–4	1–2	0–4	2–6	3–1	4–3	0–3	3–2	7–0	1–2	1–4
Bocskai	2–2		3–0	1–2	1–3	2–1	2–1	6–1	2–1	1–2	1–1	0–1
Budai 11	3–3	0–7		0–4	2–5	2–1	1–1	1–1	3–1	2–3	3–1	0–0
Ferencváros	4–0	1–2	7–3		0–1	4–0	2–0	5–1	4–3	6–1	2–1	4–2
Hungária	1–2	1–2	4–1	1–4		1–2	5–1	1–2	0–3	1–3	3–2	1–1
Kispest	5–0	1–3	3–1	4–7	3–3		4–3	3–3	2–2	3–0	1–2	1–6
Miskolci Attila	2–3	3–0	1–1	1–3	0–2	0–0		1–0	2–6	5–1	0–1	1–3
Nemzeti	3–3	1–1	3–3	1–5	1–6	1–2	0–1		1–1	1–1	1–1	1–2
Phöbus	2–1	3–4	1–1	0–6	4–7	1–1	1–4	2–1		2–0	2–0	1–3
Somogy	0–1	0–6	0–2	4–9	1–7	2–0	0–1	3–2	2–2		1–3	2–8
Szeged FC	3–1	3–2	1–5	3–4	1–3	0–4	2–1	8–2	1–0	1–2		1–3
Újpest	1–1	2–0	3–1	2–2	3–0	4–1	6–0	2–1	2–2	7–2	3–2	

Source: rsssf.com
Legend: Blue = home team win; Yellow = draw; Red = away team win.

== See also ==
- 1933–34 Magyar Kupa
