= József Albert =

Hungarian footballer (1912–1994)

Personal information
- Date of birth: 7 May 1912
- Place of birth: Nyustya, Kingdom of Hungary
- Date of death: 16 April 1994 (aged 81)
- Place of death: Budapest, Hungary

Senior career*
Years	Team	Apps	(Gls)
1930–1941	Szegedi AK		

Managerial career
- 1941: FK Sport Bezdan
- 1945–1951: Szegedi AK
- 1956–1959: Syria
- 1961–1963: Komlói Bányász SK
- 1964–1965: Videoton FC
- 1966: Szombathelyi Haladás VSE
- 1967: Lebanon
- 1969: Szombathelyi Haladás VSE
- 1970: Vasas SC
- * Club domestic league appearances and goals

József Albert (7 May 1912 – 16 April 1994) was a Hungarian football player and coach. He played his entire career for Szegedi AK (1930–1941). Following his retirement as a player, he coached several Hungarian teams (1941–1970), in addition to the Syria (1956–1959) and Lebanon (1967) national teams.

== Playing career ==
Albert played for Szegedi AK from 1930 until 1941.

== Managerial career ==
Albert mainly coached Hungarian teams such as FK Sport Bezdan, Szegedi AK, Komlói Bányász SK, Videoton FC, Szombathelyi Haladás VSE, and Vasas SC. He won the Mitropa Cup with Vasas SC in 1970.

Albert went to the Middle East in the 1950s to coach the Syria national team, with whom he won the 1957 Pan Arab Games, and the Lebanon national team in 1967. During Lebanon's participation in the 1968 Summer Olympics qualifiers, held in Tokyo, Japan, from September to October 1967, Albert was unable to obtain a visa for Japan and was replaced by Joseph Nalbandian.

== Honours ==
=== Coach ===
Syria

- Pan Arab Games: 1957

Vasas

- Mitropa Cup: 1960–70
