= Zuglói SE =

Hungarian football club

- Full name: Zuglói Sport Egyesület
- Founded: 1921
- Dissolved: 1978
- Ground: Lantos Mihály sportközpont
- Capacity: 2,750
Home colours

Zuglói Sport Egyesület was a Hungarian football club from Zugló, Budapest.

== History ==
Zuglói Sport Egyesület debuted in the 1938–39 season of the Hungarian League and finished ninth.

== Name Changes ==
- 1921–1923: Zuglói Nemzeti Torna Egylet
- 1923: merger with Zuglói Testvériség Futball Club
- 1923–1939: Zuglói Sport Egyesület
- 1939: merger with Danuvia SE
- 1939–1945: Zuglói Danuvia SE
- 1945: merger with Budapesti VSC, creating Zuglói MADISZ
- 1947: reestablished
- 1947–1952: Zuglói Danuvia SE
- 1948: merger with XIV. ker. MaDISz
- 1952–1953: Vasas Torpedo
- 1953–1956: Vasas Danuvia
- 1956–?: Zuglói Danuvia SE
- 1978: merger with BVG Zuglói SC

== Honours ==
- Nemzeti Bajnokság II:
  - Winners (1): 1937–38
