= Ignác Amsel =

Hungarian footballer (1899–1974)

Personal information
- Date of birth: 17 January 1899
- Place of birth: Budapest, Austro-Hungarian Empire
- Date of death: 15 July 1974 (aged 75)
- Place of death: Rio de Janeiro, Brazil
- Height: 1.87 m (6 ft 2 in)
- Position: Goalkeeper

Youth career
- Kispesti AC

Senior career*
Years	Team	Apps	(Gls)
1920–1922	Békéscsaba		
1922–1925	Ferencváros		
1925–1926	Ancona		
1927–1933	Ferencváros		
1934	Honvéd		
1935–1937	Ancona		

International career
1921–1931	Hungary	9	(0)

Managerial career
- 1938: Ferencváros
- 1939: São Paulo
- 1945: Atlético Mineiro
- 1947: São Paulo (youth)
- * Club domestic league appearances and goals

Ignác Amsel (17 January 1899 – 15 July 1974), was a Hungarian football player and manager, who played as a goalkeeper.

== Club career ==
Amsel began his professional career at Békéscsaba 1912 Előre, and after standing out, he arrived at Ferencváros in 1922, where he played most of his career and was Hungarian champion three times, especially in 1931–32 when Ferencváros won all 22 matches of the competition. He also had two spells at Ancona and Honvéd.

In 1931 he was the starting goalkeeper on Ferencváros' tour of South America.

== International career ==
Amsel played in nine matches for the Hungary national team, from 1920 to 1931, being noted for being the first goalkeeper to save a penalty for the national team, against Austria in 1922.

== Managerial career ==
Amsel began his career as a coach after retiring as an athlete in 1938 at his most identified club, Ferencváros. He remained in office shortly after the persecution of Jews in Europe intensified, and he then emigrated to Brazil. In 1939 he had his first experience as a coach on Brazilian soil, with São Paulo FC, but according to the newspapers at the time, he did not adapt and was eventually replaced by Amilcar Barbuy. In 1945 he had another experience, this time at Atlético Mineiro, and in 1947 he was hired again by São Paulo to train the youth and reserves teams, where he remained until 1949.

== Honours ==
=== Player ===
Ferencváros

- Nemzeti Bajnokság I: 1926–27, 1927–28, 1931–32
- Magyar Kupa: 1926–27, 1927–28, 1932–33
- Mitropa Cup: 1928
