= 1934–35 Nemzeti Bajnokság I =

Nemzeti Bajnokság I
- Season: 1934–35
- Champions: Újpest FC
- Relegated: Somogy FC

Final standings of the Hungarian League 1934–35 season

== Final standings ==
Pos	Team	Pld	W	D	L	GF	GA	GR	Pts	Qualification or relegation
1	Újpest FC	22	15	5	2	66	17	3.882	35	Champions
2	Ferencváros	22	14	5	3	72	32	2.250	33	
3	Hungária	22	13	3	6	63	32	1.969	29	
4	Szeged FC	22	11	5	6	44	44	1.000	27	
5	Kispest	22	8	7	7	41	50	0.820	23	
6	Phöbus	22	8	5	9	48	46	1.043	21	
7	Soroksár FC	22	7	7	8	35	47	0.745	21	
8	Budai 11	22	7	6	9	36	36	1.000	20	
9	Bocskai FC	22	6	5	11	35	39	0.897	17	
10	III. Kerület	22	6	5	11	35	44	0.795	17	
11	Miskolci Attila	22	6	3	13	24	57	0.421	15	
12	Somogy FC	22	1	4	17	24	79	0.304	6	Relegated to NB II

Source: rsssf.com

== Results ==
Home \ Away	KER	BOC	B11	FTC	HUN	KIS	MIS	PHÖ	SOM	SOR	SZE	ÚJP
III. Kerület		2–0	4–1	2–6	1–2	1–1	0–0	4–0	2–2	1–1	1–2	1–1
Bocskai	0–2		0–1	0–1	2–4	1–2	8–0	2–0	4–1	1–1	2–4	0–5
Budai 11	3–1	3–3		1–0	0–1	2–2	5–1	1–1	6–0	2–3	0–4	0–1
Ferencváros	3–1	5–1	0–2		3–2	3–1	1–3	6–1	7–3	2–0	4–4	0–0
Hungária	6–3	0–2	1–1	1–3		1–1	2–0	5–2	7–1	7–1	2–0	2–3
Kispest	1–3	2–2	3–2	0–4	0–5		5–1	3–3	2–1	1–0	2–2	0–4
Miskolci Attila	3–0	1–0	1–3	0–5	1–3	1–2		0–5	2–0	1–3	0–1	2–4
Phöbus	2–1	1–2	3–1	3–3	2–0	4–3	2–2		1–1	2–3	0–1	0–2
Somogy	2–1	0–3	1–1	1–5	2–6	2–3	1–2	0–5		1–2	2–3	1–4
Soroksár	3–1	1–1	2–0	4–4	2–1	2–4	1–1	0–3	1–1		3–3	0–3
Szeged FC	0–2	3–1	1–1	1–6	1–4	2–2	1–2	1–5	2–1	4–2		2–1
Újpest	5–1	0–0	3–0	1–1	1–1	4–1	5–0	5–3	10–0	3–0	1–2	

Source: rsssf.com
Legend: Blue = home team win; Yellow = draw; Red = away team win.
