= Johann Hoffmann (footballer) =

Austrian footballer

Personal information
- Date of birth: 6 January 1908
- Place of birth: Vienna, Austria
- Date of death: 30 November 1974
- Place of death: Vienna, Austria
- Position: Forward

Senior career*
Years	Team	Apps	(Gls)
1925–1931	Rapid	72	(23)
1931	SC Weiße Elf Wien		
1932–1935	DSV Saaz		
1935–1937	RC Strasbourg		
1937–1938	FC Sochaux		
1939	SC Weiße Elf Wien		

International career
1929	Austria	1	(0)
- * Club domestic league appearances and goals

Johann Hoffmann (6 January 1908 – 30 November 1974) was an Austrian footballer. In the 1920s Hoffmann won 2 national Austrian titles with SK Rapid Wien. In 1929 Hoffmann had his sole start for the Austrian national selection. In the 1930s Hoffmann won both the German-bohemian champions title and also the French champions title with different clubs.

== Career ==
In November 1925, at the age of 17 Hoffmann had his first cap for the starting 11 of SK Rapid Wien in the position of center forward. He replaced legendary Richard Kuthan and racked up 9 goals in his first season. In 1927 Hoffmann garnered his first title with a 3:0 win over FK Austria Wien in the Austrian's Soccer Associations cup final. In the same year SK Rapid Wien participated in the Mitropa Cup where Hoffmann scored 4 goals in the first round against Hajduk Split but didn't start in the final against AC Sparta Prague. In the following years Hoffmann played mostly the right mid-fielder for SK Rapid Wien but was not a guaranteed starter in that position. Up to 1931 he won two Austrian national championships with SK Rapid Wien. In 1932 after losing his starting position he transferred to DSV Saaz in Bohemia (Czechoslovakia) with whom he won 2 league titles.

In 1936, Hoffmann transferred to French first division team RC Strasbourg with whom in his first season they finished 3rd and in the following year 6th in the French premier division. In the same season RC Strasbourg lost 1:2 in the French Cup final against FC Sochaux. The following season Hoffmann transferred to FC Sochaux and won the French championship title.

After his playing career came to an end Hoffmann returned to Vienna and briefly coached the SC Weiße Elf Wien.

== Achievements ==
- 2 × Mitropacup finalist: 1927, 1928
- 2 × Austrian Champion: 1929, 1930
- 1 × French Champion: 1938
- 2 × German-Bohemian Champion: 1934, 1935
- 1 × Austrian-Cup winner: 1927
- 1 × German-Bohemian Cup winner: 1934
- 1 start for Austria's National team: 1929
