= Sándor Tátrai =

Hungarian football manager

Personal information
- Date of birth: 8 July 1914
- Place of birth: Tuzla, Bosnia and Herzegovina
- Date of death: 5 September 1970
- Place of death: Múcsony, Hungary
- Position: Defender

Senior career*
Years	Team	Apps	(Gls)
1936-1944	Ferencváros	166	(10)

Managerial career
- 1958-1961: Ferencváros
- 1966: Ferencváros
- 1967-1968: Szombathely
- 1969-1970: Diósgyőr
- * Club domestic league appearances and goals

Sándor Tátrai (8 July 1914 – 5 September 1970) was a Hungarian professional football manager and former player.

== Career ==
He started playing football in Rákosszentmihályi AFC and later in Salgótarjáni BTC. In 1936, he was signed by Ferencvárosi TC. He scored his first goal in a 2-0 victory over Phöbus FC.

== Managerial career ==
=== Ferencváros ===
Between 1958 and 1961, he managed Ferencvárosi TC. He replaced Árpád Csanád. His debuted with a goalless draw against Csepel SC at the Népstadion on 2 March 1958. In the 1957–58 Nemzeti Bajnokság I, Ferencváros finished in the third position. In the 1958–59 Nemzeti Bajnokság I season, Ferencváros finished in the seventh position. In the 1959–60 Nemzeti Bajnokság I, Ferencváros finished in the second position. Ferencváros also qualified for the 1960–61 European Cup Winners' Cup. In the 1960–61 Nemzeti Bajnokság I, Ferencváros finished in the fourth position and Tátrai was replaced by József Mészáros.

During his management, Flórián Albert debuted in Ferencváros.

In 1966, he managed Ferencváros a second time.

=== Szombathely ===
In the 1967 Nemzeti Bajnokság I season, he managed Szombathelyi Haladás. Haladás finished in the 12th position winning 10 matches.

=== Diósgyór ===
In the 1969 Nemzeti Bajnokság I season, he managed Diósgyőri VTK. Diósgyőr finished in the 13th position winning seven matches.

== Death ==
He died in a training match during his spell at Diósgyőri VTK.
