= 1938–39 Nemzeti Bajnokság I =

Nemzeti Bajnokság I
- Season: 1938–39
- Champions: Újpest FC
- Relegated: Zuglói SE; Salgótarjáni SE
- Matches: 181
- Goals: 827 (4.57 per match)

Final standings of the Hungarian League 1938–39 season

== Final standings ==
Pos	Team	Pld	W	D	L	GF	GA	GR	Pts	Qualification or relegation
1	Újpest FC	26	20	4	2	107	26	4.115	44	Champions
2	Ferencváros	26	19	5	2	121	44	2.750	43	
3	Hungária	26	18	5	3	74	32	2.313	41	
4	Kispest	26	15	4	7	62	42	1.476	34	
5	Szeged FC	26	12	7	7	58	42	1.381	31	
6	Nemzeti SC	26	10	8	8	57	53	1.075	28	
7	Budafok	26	9	7	10	44	52	0.846	25	
8	Phöbus	26	9	6	11	61	63	0.968	24	
9	Szolnoki MÁV	26	10	3	13	44	59	0.746	23	
10	Elektromos FC	26	7	7	12	45	51	0.882	21	
11	Szürketaxi FC	26	7	6	13	62	70	0.886	20	
12	Bocskai FC	26	4	5	17	33	80	0.413	13	
13	Zuglói SE	26	2	5	19	31	97	0.320	9	Relegated to NB II
14	Salgótarjáni SE	26	3	2	21	28	116	0.241	8	Relegated to NB II

Source: rsssf.com

== Results ==
Home \ Away	BOC	BFC	ELE	FTC	HUN	KIS	NEM	PHÖ	SAL	SZE	SZO	SZÜ	ÚJP	ZUG
Bocskai		1–4	1–7	3–12	0–3	0–3	3–3	0–3	8–0	0–6	3–1	1–3	0–3	3–2
Budafok	1–0		1–0	2–2	1–2	1–2	2–4	1–2	2–1	1–3	1–2	1–2	0–9	3–1
Elektromos	1–1	2–2		0–3	2–1	0–1	1–1	1–2	4–0	0–3	2–1	1–5	2–3	3–3
Ferencváros	5–1	2–1	2–1		0–3	4–1	3–2	4–4	8–1	3–2	5–3	6–3	3–3	8–1
Hungária	4–2	0–3	2–1	0–1		3–3	1–1	3–2	3–2	1–1	4–2	2–1	1–1	2–1
Kispest	3–1	0–0	4–0	2–3	2–4		1–2	3–3	6–1	0–2	2–1	3–2	1–1	3–2
Nemzeti	3–0	1–1	1–1	3–3	0–1	1–6		0–0	8–1	5–5	2–4	4–3	0–4	1–2
Phöbus	3–1	1–1	0–2	1–9	2–6	0–4	1–2		4–3	2–3	1–2	3–3	1–4	1–0
Salgótarjáni SE	0–1	0–3	0–4	0–13	0–5	2–3	1–3	1–5		0–4	3–0	2–2	0–10	2–2
Szeged FC	1–1	1–1	2–3	4–2	1–5	2–0	2–4	2–2	1–3		3–0	2–2	1–3	2–0
Szolnoki	1–0	1–3	4–1	1–1	2–2	0–2	2–1	3–5	1–2	2–1		3–2	0–6	2–2
Szürketaxi	2–2	4–4	2–2	1–6	0–6	2–3	-:+ (Note: The match between Szürketaxi and Nemzeti was settled with a goalless win for Nemzeti.)	3–2	3–2	1–2	1–2		0–5	9–1
Újpest	6–1	8–1	4–2	1–3	1–6	3–0	4–0	2–0	11–0	0–0	3–0	4–2		4–0
Zugló	0–0	1–3	2–2	0–10	1–4	2–4	1–5	0–11	2–1	1–2	1–4	1–4	2–4	

Source: rsssf.com
Legend: Blue = home team win; Yellow = draw; Red = away team win.
