= 1932–33 Nemzeti Bajnokság I =

Nemzeti Bajnokság I
- Season: 1932–33
- Champions: Újpest FC
- Relegated: Soroksár FC

Final standings of the Hungarian League 1932/1933 season

== Final standings ==
Pos	Team	Pld	W	D	L	GF	GA	GR	Pts	Qualification or relegation
1	Újpest FC	22	17	3	2	89	30	2.967	37	Champions
2	Hungária	22	16	4	2	74	28	2.643	36	
3	Ferencváros	22	16	3	3	80	22	3.636	35	
4	III. Kerület	22	11	4	7	49	39	1.256	26	
5	Budai 11	22	10	5	7	41	43	0.953	25	
6	Bocskai FC	22	9	5	8	40	35	1.143	23	
7	Kispest	22	6	7	9	40	55	0.727	19	
8	Szeged FC	22	7	5	10	32	47	0.681	19	
9	Miskolci Attila	22	6	1	15	30	50	0.600	13	
10	Nemzeti SC	22	4	5	13	32	62	0.516	13	
11	Somogy FC	22	3	3	16	25	63	0.397	9	
12	Soroksár FC	22	3	3	16	27	85	0.318	9	Relegated to NB II

Source: rsssf.com

== Results ==
Home \ Away	KER	BOC	B11	FTC	HUN	KIS	MIS	NEM	SOM	SOR	SZE	ÚJP
III. Kerület		1–1	1–2	2–5	1–2	4–2	1–0	1–2	3–1	2–1	2–4	1–2
Bocskai	3–1		0–2	0–1	2–1	3–2	0–1	6–1	0–1	5–0	2–2	4–2
Budai 11	1–6	3–0		1–6	0–3	2–2	3–2	2–2	3–0	3–1	4–1	0–6
Ferencváros	2–3	1–1	3–0		1–2	8–0	1–0	2–0	7–2	8–2	7–1	0–1
Hungária	2–2	4–0	1–0	0–0		3–3	9–0	5–1	6–0	6–3	4–2	3–4
Kispest	2–2	1–0	1–0	2–3	1–3		3–1	1–2	1–1	7–2	1–0	1–9
Miskolci Attila	1–2	1–3	1–3	1–4	2–3	0–1		2–0	3–2	2–2	1–2	1–2
Nemzeti	1–4	0–0	0–3	0–5	1–4	4–4	1–3		4–4	8–1	0–0	1–7
Somogy	2–5	1–5	1–1	0–2	1–2	0–3	1–2	1–2		2–1	2–1	0–4
Soroksár	1–2	2–2	2–4	0–7	1–4	2–2	0–3	1–0	1–0		1–2	2–7
Szeged FC	0–0	2–3	1–1	1–4	0–4	2–0	3–2	3–1	3–1	0–1		1–5
Újpest	2–3	5–0	3–3	3–3	3–3	3–0	4–1	3–1	4–2	9–0	1–0	

Source: rsssf.com
Legend: Blue = home team win; Yellow = draw; Red = away team win.
