= József Mucha =

Football player and manager

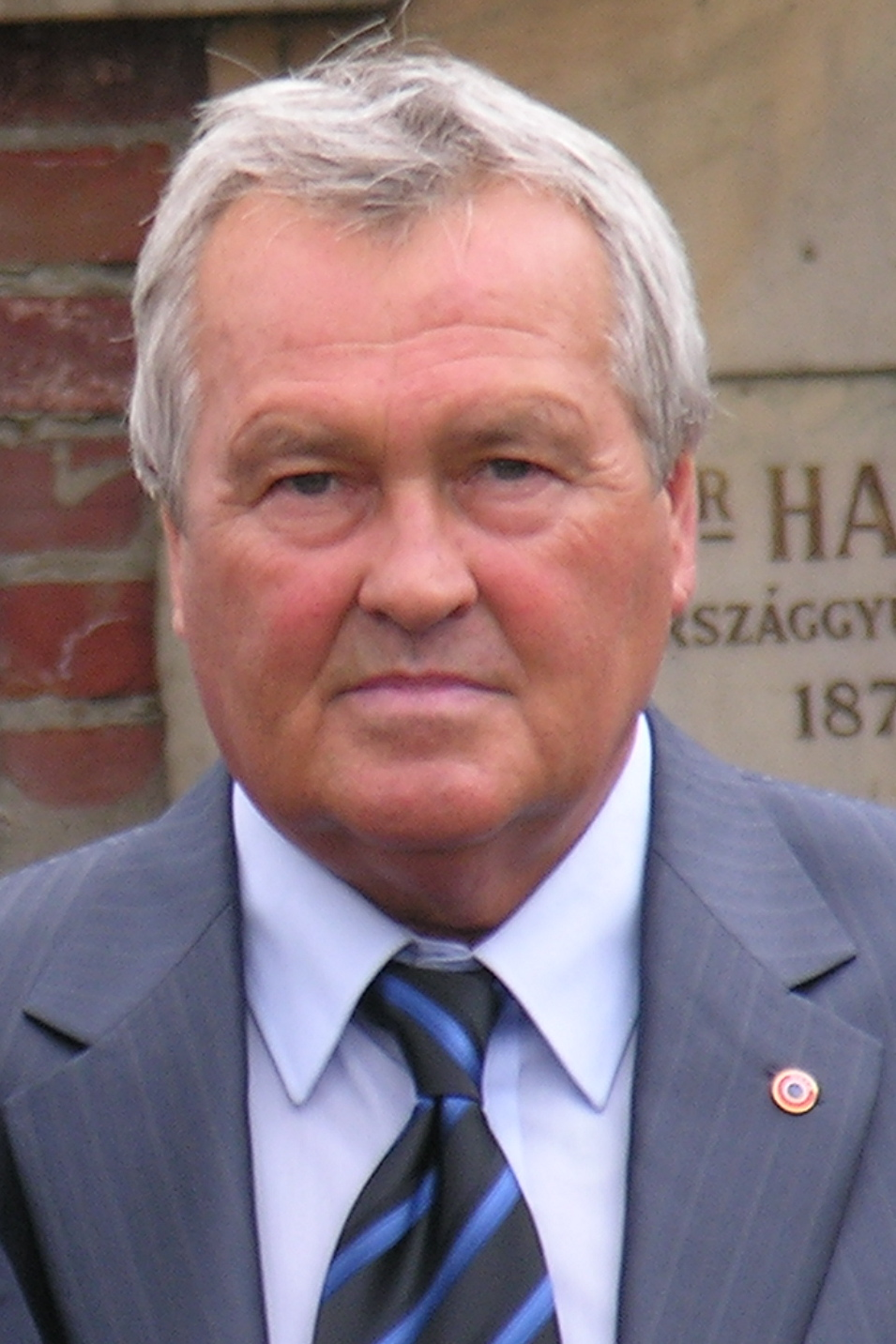
- Mucha in 2011

Personal information
- Date of birth: 25 October 1951 (age 75)
- Place of birth: Máza, Hungary
- Position: Midfielder

Youth career
- 1964–1966: Mázaszászvári Bányász
- 1966–1968: Dorogi FC

Senior career*
Years	Team	Apps	(Gls)
1968–1970	Dorogi FC	32	(7)
1970–1981	Ferencváros	251	(35)
1981–1983	K.S.V. Waregem		

International career
1974–1981	Hungary	6	(0)

Managerial career
- 1996: Ferencváros
- 1998: FC Tiszaújváros
- 1999: Ferencváros
- 2001: BFC Siófok
- 2001: Kistarcsa
- 2002–2005: Rubeola FC Csömör (futsal)
- 2007-: Kerepes
- * Club domestic league appearances and goals

József Mucha (born 25 October 1951) is a former Hungarian professional footballer who played as a midfielder, later became a football coach. He was a member of the Hungary national team.

== Playing career ==
Mucha started playing football in his hometown and moved to Dorogi FC, where he continued his career with the local youth team. His talent was quickly noticed by the then coach of the adult team, János Varga, who gave him a chance to play in the senior team at the age of 17, where he played with such renowned teammates as István Ilku, László Csóri, József Bartalos and István Fellegi. He was soon invited to the youth national team when he was discovered by Ferencváros and remained loyal to the Green and White for 11 years. Two-time Hungarian champion and four-time Magyar Kupa (MNK) winner. Member of the Ferencváros team that reached the final of the 1974–75 European Cup Winners' Cup. In 1981, he turned professional for two years with K.S.V. Waregem in Belgium.

He played six times for the Hungary national team between 1974 and 1981.

== Coaching career ==
Mucha graduated as a football coach from the University of Physical Education in Budapest. From 1983 he worked as a coach at Ferencváros. He first worked with the junior team and then as a coach for Tibor Nyilasi. In 1996 and 1999 he was temporarily head coach of the first team on two occasions. Later, his name was mentioned as a possible head coach of Dorogi FC, which did not materialize. He led FC Tiszaújváros and then BFC Siófok for one season each, both in Nemzeti Bajnokság I. On two occasions he led his players against the team from Dorogi FC and both times came out victorious. Firstly, as coach of FC Tiszaújváros in 1998 and then as coach of BFC Siófok in 2001. A special attraction of this match was that Dorogi FC was managed by the same László Strausz, who had been head coach of BFC Siófok a few weeks earlier. He is the appointed national coach of the Hungary national team and also the coach of the futsal team of the NB I champion Rubeola FC Csömör.

== Honours ==
- Nemzeti Bajnokság I (NB I)
  - Champion: 1975-76, 1980-81
- Magyar Kupa (MNK)
  - Winner: 1972, 1974, 1976, 1978
