= Szürketaxi FC =

Hungarian football club

- Full name: Szürketaxi Futball Club
- Founded: 1932
- Dissolved: 1947
Home colours

Szürketaxi Futball Club was a Hungarian football club from the town of Budapest.

== History ==
Szürketaxi Futball Club debuted in the 1937–38 season of the Hungarian League and finished ninth.

== Name Changes ==
- 1932–1937: Szürketaxi FC
- 1937–1940: Taxisok
- 1940–1946: did not operate
- 1946–1947: Szürketaxi FC
- 1947: merger with MOGÜRT SC
- 1948: exit from MOGÜRT SC

== Honours ==
- Nemzeti Bajnokság II:
  - Winners (1): 1936–37

== Seasons ==
The highest league that Szürketaxi FC have ever played was the first division.

Season	Tier	Club's name	Position	Pts
1946–47	5	Szürketaxi	5 / 15	32
1939–40	1	Szürketaxi FC	12 / 14	14
1938–39	1	Szürketaxi FC	11 / 14	20
1937–38	1	Szürketaxi FC	9 / 14	22
1936–37	2	Szürketaxi FC	1 / 12	42
1935–36	2	Szürketaxi FC	6 / 14	28
1934–35	2	Szürketaxi FC	3 / 13	33
1933–34	2	Szürketaxi FC	3 / 14	40
1932–33	2	Szürketaxi FC	3 / 14	39
