= István Sándor =

István Sándor may refer to:

- István Sándor (martyr), Hungarian anti-communist and Roman Catholic martyr
- István Sándor (rower), Hungarian rower
- István Sándor (footballer, born 1986), Hungarian football central midfielder
- Ishtvan Sandor, Ukrainian footballer of Hungarian origin

== See also ==
- István Sándorfi
