= Phöbus FC =

Hungarian football club

- Full name: Phöbus Futball Club
- Founded: 1932
- Dissolved: 1950
- Ground: Phöbus Pálya
Home colours	Away colours

Phöbus Futball Club was a Hungarian football club from the town of Budapest.

== History ==
Phöbus FC debuted in the 1936–37 season of the Hungarian League and finished fourth.

== Name Changes ==
- 1932–1939: Phöbus FC
- 1939–1950: Phöbus Sportegyesület
- 1950: merger with Elektromos FC

== Honours ==
- Nemzeti Bajnokság II:
  - Winners (1): 1932–33

== Seasons ==
The table table below shows the seasons of Phöbus FC.

Season	Tier	Club's name	Position	Pts
1932–33	2	Phőbus FC	1 / 14	47
1933–34	1	Phöbus FC	8 / 12	18
1934–35	1	Phöbus FC	6 / 12	21
1935–36	1	Phöbus FC	4 / 14	35
1936–37	1	Phöbus FC	4 / 14	36
1937–38	1	Phöbus FC	6 / 14	25
1938–39	1	Phöbus FC	8 / 14	24
1945	2	Phöbus SE	5 / 12	26
1945–46	2	Phöbus SE	7 / 14	26
1946–47	3	Phöbus SE	6 / 15	32
1947–48	3	Phöbus SE	1 / 16	48
1948–49	2	Phőbus SE	8 / 16	31
1949–50	2	Phöbus SE	13 / 16	23
1950	2	Phöbus SE	16 / 16	-
