= 1935–36 Nemzeti Bajnokság I =

Football competition

Nemzeti Bajnokság I
- Season: 1935–36
- Champions: MTK Hungária FC
- Relegated: Törekvés SE; Salgótarjáni BTC; Attila FC

Statistics of Nemzeti Bajnokság I in the 1935–36 season.

== Overview ==
It was contested by 14 teams, and MTK Hungária FC won the championship.

== League standings ==
Pos	Team	Pld	W	D	L	GF	GA	GR	Pts
1	MTK Hungária FC	26	22	4	0	87	21	4.143	48
2	Újpest FC	26	19	5	2	86	29	2.966	43
3	Ferencvárosi TC	26	19	1	6	103	46	2.239	39
4	Phöbus FC	26	16	3	7	76	50	1.520	35
5	Kispest AC	26	12	5	9	60	56	1.071	29
6	Bocskai FC	26	9	6	11	55	51	1.078	24
7	Szeged FC	26	9	5	12	35	52	0.673	23
8	III. Kerületi TUE	26	10	3	13	38	57	0.667	23
9	Budai 11	26	9	4	13	43	53	0.811	22
10	Budafok FC	26	8	5	13	57	73	0.781	21
11	Soroksár FC	26	7	6	13	52	71	0.732	20
12	Törekvés SE	26	6	3	17	40	86	0.465	15
13	Salgótarjáni BTC	26	4	5	17	39	84	0.464	13
14	Miskolci Attila	26	1	7	18	31	73	0.425	7 (Note: 2 points deducted.)

Source: rsssf.com

== Results ==
Home \ Away	KER	BOC	B11	BFC	FTC	HUN	KIS	MIS	PHÖ	SAL	SOR	SZE	TÖR	ÚJP
III. Kerület		2–0	2–1	1–1	1–5	0–6	0–2	6–1	2–5	2–0	0–2	1–4	0–2	0–2
Bocskai	2–3		6–0	0–0	0–2	1–2	4–1	2–0	1–2	3–3	2–2	0–1	2–3	0–7
Budai 11	0–1	1–0		0–1	1–3	2–2	4–2	5–1	1–7	4–3	0–1	3–0	4–2	3–0
Budafok	4–3	2–4	0–2		1–6	3–3	4–6	2–1	3–2	4–1	2–4	1–2	8–0	1–2
Ferencváros	0–2	6–3	4–0	10–3		2–3	4–1	1–1	3–1	5–3	10–3	3–2	2–0	1–4
Hungária	0–0	7–0	2–1	2–1	3–2		8–0	4–0	2–0	4–0	5–0	1–0	1–0	2–2
Kispest	0–1	1–1	3–1	4–1	3–6	0–1		2–2	0–1	1–1	2–1	3–1	5–2	2–4
Miskolci Attila	2–3	0–5	3–3	3–3	1–5	0–4	1–3		0–4	2–3	2–2	1–2	3–2	-:+ (Note: Újpest's two matches against Miskolci Attila are ended in a goalless win for Újpest.)
Phöbus	3–2	3–4	1–2	5–1	2–0	2–6	3–3	2–1		2–1	4–5	2–0	3–2	1–1
Salgótarján	3–1	1–3	2–2	1–2	2–6	2–3	1–6	0–0	2–3		1–5	0–0	2–4	0–5
Soroksár	2–2	1–3	2–1	0–2	2–5	2–3	2–3	3–3	4–6	3–4		0–1	3–0	1–2
Szeged FC	1–0	1–1	1–0	2–2	0–2	0–5	1–2	4–2	2–3	3–1	1–1		1–1	2–7
Törekvés	0–2	0–8	2–2	5–4	1–8	0–3	0–4	3–1	0–7	1–2	1–1	7–1		1–3
Újpest	9–1	0–0	2–0	4–1	3–2	1–5	1–1	+:-	2–2	10–0	6–0	3–2	6–1	

Source: rsssf.com
Legend: Blue = home team win; Yellow = draw; Red = away team win.
