= Jenő Dalnoki =

Hungarian footballer and coach

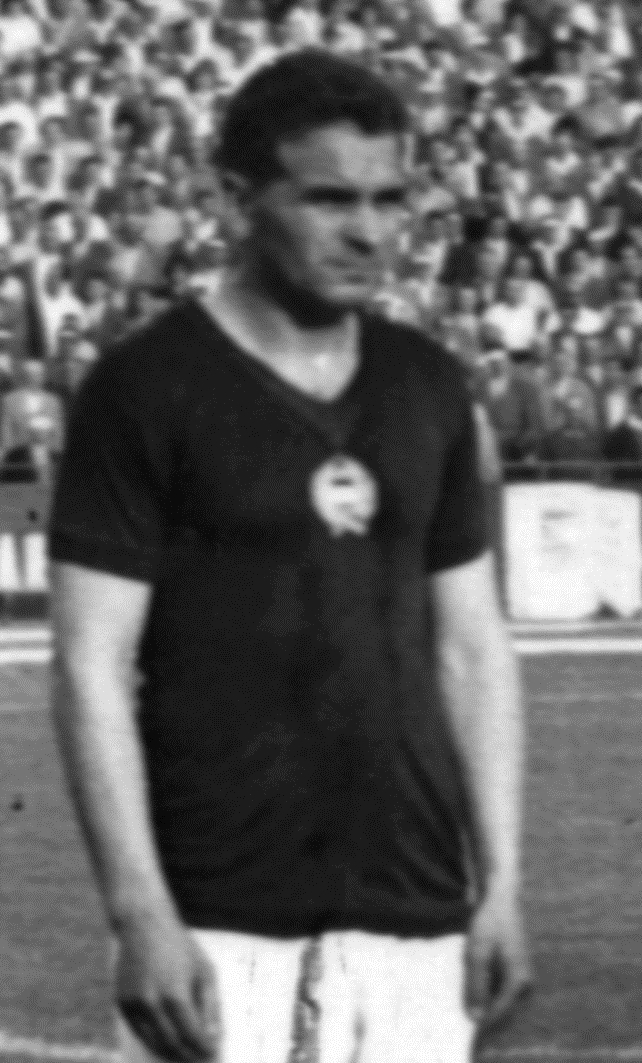

Personal information
- Date of birth: 12 December 1932
- Place of birth: Budapest, Hungary
- Date of death: 4 February 2006 (aged 73)
- Place of death: Budapest, Hungary
- Position: Defender

Senior career*
Years	Team	Apps	(Gls)
1950–1966	Ferencvárosi TC		

International career
1952–1961	Hungary	14	(0)

Managerial career
- 1970: Ferencvárosi TC
- 1973–1978: Ferencvárosi TC
- 1982–1984: Tatabányai Bányász
- 1985–1987: Ferencvárosi TC
- * Club domestic league appearances and goals

Olympic medal record

Representing Hungary

Men's football
Gold medal – first place	1952 Helsinki	Team competition
Bronze medal – third place	1960 Rome	Team competition

Jenő Dalnoki (12 December 1932 – 4 February 2006) was a Hungarian footballer. As a player Dalnoki played for both Ferencvárosi TC and Hungary. He had the reputation as a tough defender as well as a tough coach. He won a gold medal in football at the 1952 Summer Olympics and a bronze medal in football at the 1960 Summer Olympics.
