= Gábor Urbancsik =

Hungarian football manager

Personal information
- Date of birth: 1907
- Place of birth: Budapest, Hungary
- Date of death: 21 December 1971
- Place of death: Budapest, Hungary

Managerial career
- Years: Team
- 1945-1946: Ferencvárosi TC
- 1948-1949: Szentlőrinci AC
- 1949-1950: Budapesti Postás SE
- 1951: Budapesti Kinizsi
- 1954: Szombathelyi Lokomotív
- 1954-1955: Budapesti Spartacus

Gábor Urbancsik (born 1907, died 21 December 1971) was a Hungarian professional football manager and former player.

== Managerial career ==
=== Ferencváros ===
On 8 August 1945, he was appointed as the manager of Ferencváros.

He managed Ferencvárosi TC in the 1945–46 Nemzeti Bajnokság I season. On 23 September 1945, he debuted with a 5-1 victory over Újpest FC.

=== Spartacus ===
He managed Budapesti Spartacus.

=== Szombathely ===
In the 1954, he managed Szombathelyi Haladás, called Szombathelyi Lokomotív at that time. On 9 May 1954, he managed Szombathely for the first time in the 1954 Nemzeti Bajnokság I season.
