= Szombathelyi Haladás =

Hungarian football club

Haladás
- Full name: Szombathelyi Haladás
- Nickname: Hali
- Founded: 1919; 107 years ago
- Ground: Haladás Sportkomplexum
- Capacity: 8,903
- Chairman: Béla Illés
- Manager: Aleksandar Jović
- League: NB II
- 2022–23: NB II, 9th of 20
- Website: www.haladas.hu/kezdolap
Home colours	Away colours

Szombathelyi Haladás (Hungarian: [ˈsombɒthɛji ˈhɒlɒdaːʃ]), is a Hungarian football club based in Szombathely. Haladás is the Hungarian word for progress. The club, which was founded in 1919, plays its home games at the Haladás Sportkomplexum which has a capacity of 8,903. The club colours are green and white.

Haladás reached the Hungarian Cup final in the years 1975, 1993 and 2002. Since its first promotion in 1936 the club has spent 51 seasons in the first division of the Hungarian league, the Nemzeti Bajnokság I (NB I).

== History ==
=== The yoyo years ===
Since 1919 the club have been famous for their yoyo between the Hungarian First Division and the Hungarian Second Division. The club were unable to strengthen their stay in the first league which resulted a continuous yoyo effect.

=== 1930s ===
Szombathely won the 1935-36 Nyugatmagyarországi LASz and were promoted for the first time to the first division. Although Soproni FAC also collected 41 points, Haladás had better goal difference and finished on the first place.

In the 1936–37 Nemzeti Bajnokság I season, Haladás finished in the 12th position and were relegated to the second division.

Haladás won 1938-39 Nemzeti Bajnokság B season and were promoted to the top flight a second time. In the 1939–40 Nemzeti Bajnokság I season, Haladás finished in the 11th position and remained in the top flight for the first time. Haladás could precede Szürketaxi FC, Kassai AC, and Nemzeti SC.

=== 1940s ===
In the 1940–41 Nemzeti Bajnokság I season, Haladás finished in the 14th position and were relegated to the second division along with Törekvés SE, Tokodi Üveggyár, and BSzKRT SE. However, in the 1941-41 Nemzeti Banokság II (Zrínyi group) Haladás finished on the top position.

In the 1942–43 Nemzeti Bajnokság I season, Haladás finished in the 14th position and were relegated again. Haladás could precede only Szegedi AK and Törekvés.

=== The 2000s ===
In the 2001–02 season of the Hungarian Cup Haladás played in the final against Újpest. The club lost 2–1 after extra time. In January 2002 Haladás appointed Lázár Szentes as the new coach of the club. In the 2001–02 season Haladás was facing relegation problems. In August 2003 Lajos Détári resigned as coach of the club. In October 2003 former Zalaegerszeg championship-winner coach Péter Bozsik was appointed as the coach of the club. In the 2006–07 season of the Hungarian Second Division the club missed out on promotion to the first division because of an 11 points deduction for the use of ineligible players. BFC Siófok was promoted in the place of Haladás.

In the 2008 Haladás won the Hungarian Second Division which resulted the promotion of the club to the first division. In 2008, Haladás played with Arsenal a pre-season friendly match in Szombathely. The match finished 1–1.

In the 2008–09 season Haladás reached the best rank ever in the history of the team. The club won the bronze medal and got the right to start the qualification rounds in the Europa League.

In the Europa League 2009–10 season Haladás played against Irtysh Pavlodar in the first round. The first leg finished 1–0 thanks to Krisztián Kenesei's goal in the 79th minute. In the second leg the result was 2–1 to Irtysh, which meant that Haladás could play in the second round. In the second round Haladás played the Swedish club Elfsborg. In the first leg Haladás lost 3–0, while at home. During the second leg, Haladás drew with Elfsborg which caused them to be knocked out of the tournament.

=== 2010s ===
Szombathely were eliminated from the round of 16 of the 2018–19 Magyar Kupa by Mezőkövesd SE on 0–1 aggregate.

In the 2018–19 Nemzeti Bajnokság I season Haladás finished 12th and they were relegated to the Nemzeti Bajnokság II to compete in the 2019–20 Nemzeti Bajnokság II season.

=== 2020s ===
The 2019–20 Nemzeti Bajnokság II was abandoned due to the COVID-19 pandemic. Haladás finished the season on the 17th place thus avoiding relegation to the Nemzeti Bajnokság III.

On 25 November 2023, it was revealed that the club was close to bankruptcy. In November, the player had not received their September salary. On 29 December 2023, it was revealed that the debt of the club was substantially reduced.

In the 2023–24 Nemzeti Bajnokság II season, Haladás finished in the 14th position and were not relegated to the third division. However, the Hungarian Football Federation did not give a license to play in the second division.

On 20 February 2024, Bálint Bajner was signed. On 8 March 2024, he was taken to hospital after he fell ill due to high pulse rate. However, later that day he was released frrm the hospital. On 6 May 2024, Bajner revealed that he had signed a contract on which the badge of the club was not displayed.

On 7 May 2024, Aleksandar Jović resigned.

On 9 July 2024, Erzsébet Szántó, managing director, resigned and nobody was appointed as the official representative of the club.

On 16 July 2024, the Hungarian Football Federation excluded Haladás from the Nemzeti Bajnokság III and Magyar Kupa. Tibor Homlok, the representative of Haladás Marketing Kft., and Richárd Unger, the delegate of the local government, resigned. The Szombathelyi Haladás Kft did not have any football players; therefore, did not intend to apply for a license to play in the Nemzeti Bajnokság and Magyar Kupa. The license can be transferred to Illés Akadémia or Haladás VSE.

On 19 July 2024, the Hungarian Football Federation accepted the license of Haladás. The club changed its name to Szombathelyi MÁV Haladás VSE. By the end of 2024, the club had a lot of debts and it was close to bankruptcy. Former player of Haladás, András Schäfer, donated 15 million Hungarian Forints to the club to avoid bankruptcy. Later, it was announced that Schäfer purchased shares of the club, thus becoming one of the owners of his former club.

On 4 January 2025, former Haladás player and legend, Zoltán Halmosi, (father of Péter Halmosi) died. He played 306 Nemzeti Bajnokság I matches and scored 19 goals for Haladás. On 10 January 2025, Ferenc Vígh was appointed as the manager of the club. A couple of days later, it was revealed that Ferenc Vígh had been sentences before and he was also under investigation by the police at the time of his appointment.

On 15 August 2026, more than 2000 spectators attended a local derby between Haladás and Gábor Király's Király SZE match in the 2026–27 Nemzeti Bajnokság III match.

== Colours, badge, and nicknames ==
The colours of the club are green and white. This combination is very common in Hungarian League since Ferencváros, Győr, Kaposvár, Paks have the same colour combination.

=== Manufacturers and shirt sponsors ===
The following table shows in detail Szombathelyi Haladás kit manufacturers and shirt sponsors by year:

Period	Kit manufacturer	Shirt sponsor
−2008	Legea	Strabag
2008–11	Legea	Contact Zrt.
2011–12	Legea	Contact Marketing Zrt. / Sopron Bank
2012–13	Legea	Contact Marketing Zrt.
2013–14	Legea	—
2014–15	Legea	AGS sport 23
2015–18	Adidas	Swietelsky
2018–2021	2Rule	
2021–present	Adidas	Vasútvill Kft.

== Stadium ==
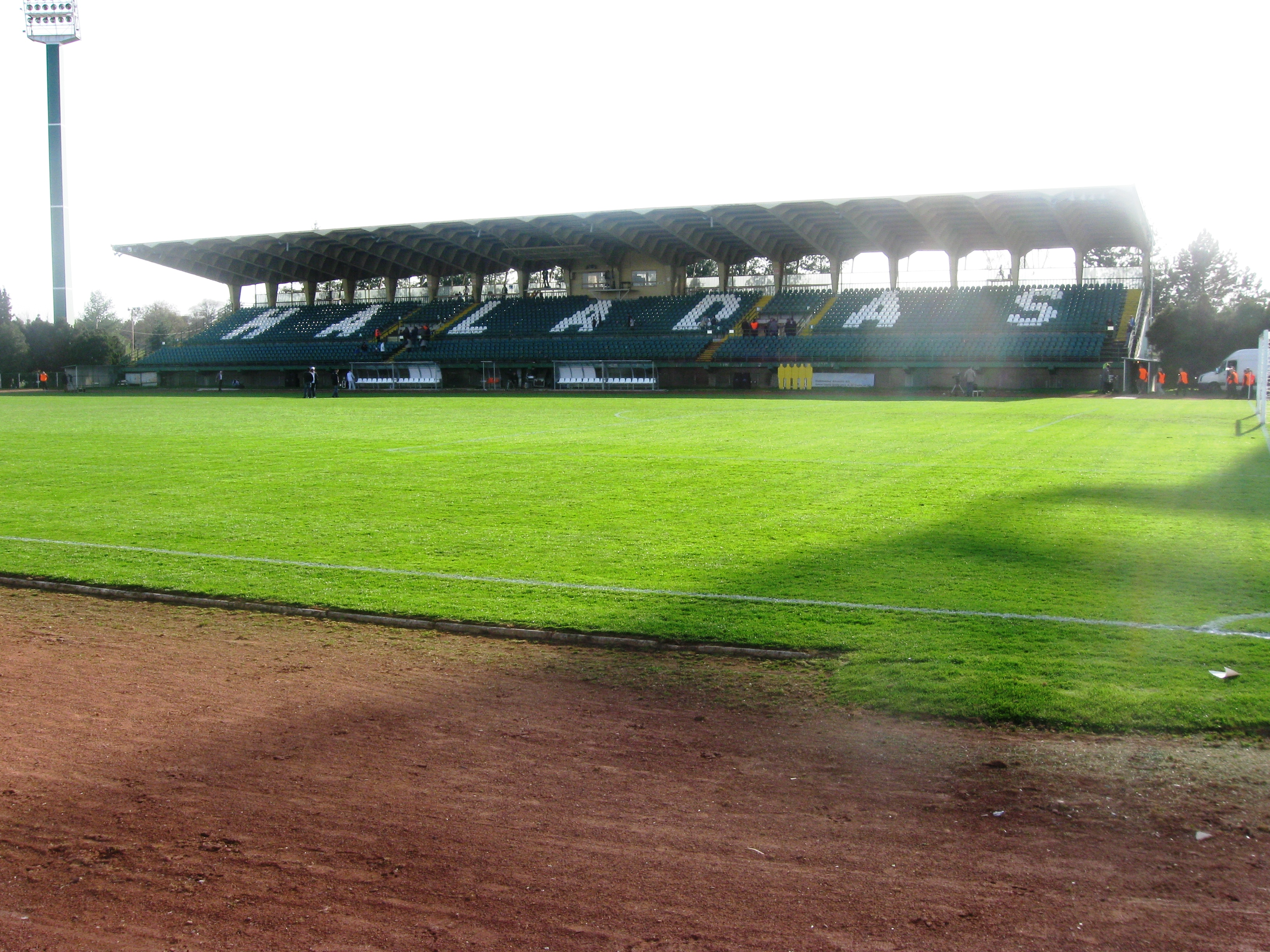
The demolished old stadium located in Rohonci úti Stadion

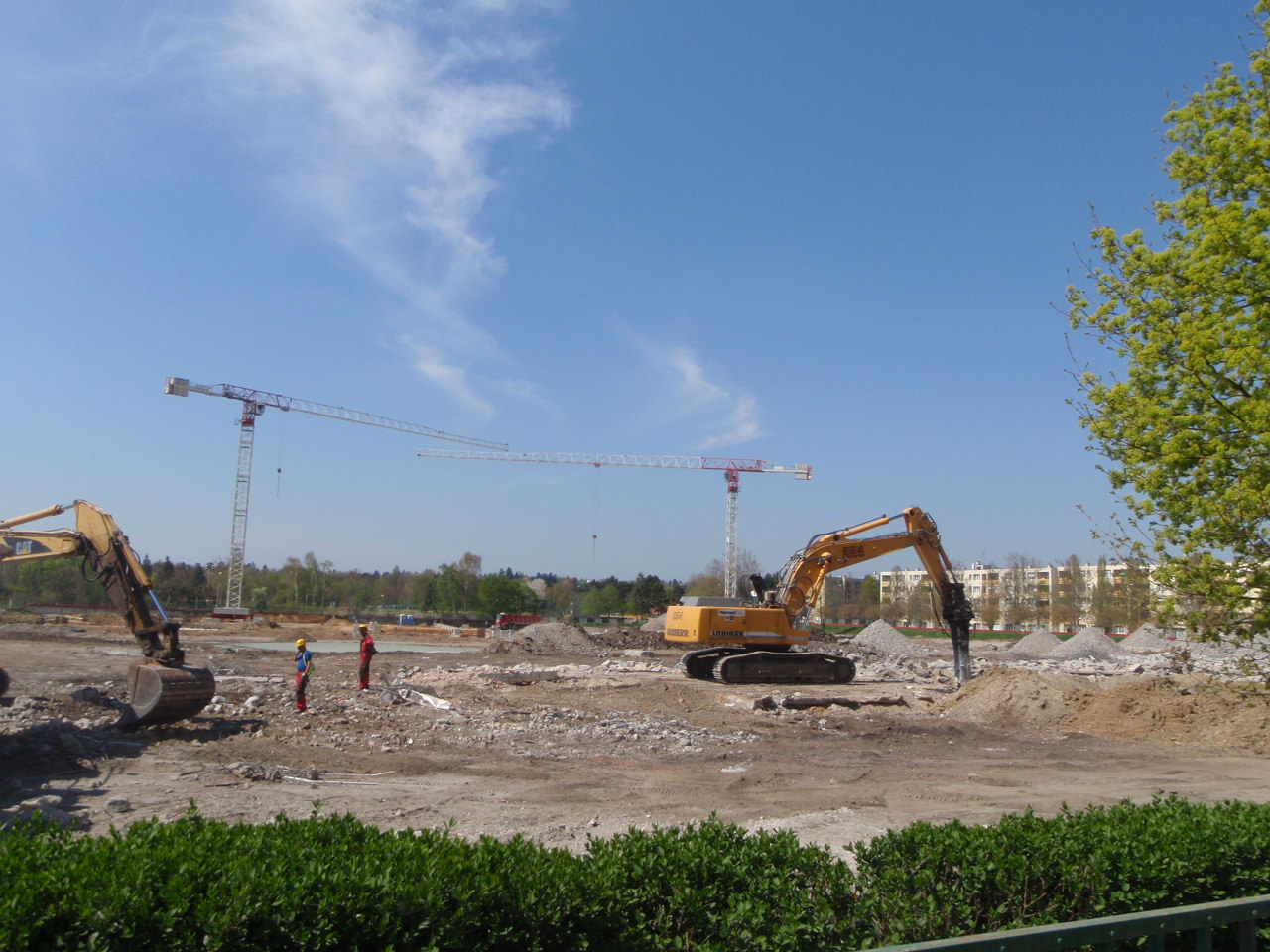
The area of the demolished stadium in April 2016

Szombathelyi Haladás play their home matches at the Rohonci úti Stadion situated in Szombathely, Hungary. The capacity of the old stadium was 9,500. It was built in 1923 and it was demolished in 2015. It hosted the hammer throw events for the IAAF World Athletics Final as the Stade Louis II in Monaco is too small. Currently Haladás play their home matches in Sopron.

On 8 November 2017, the Haladás Sportkomplexum was opened. The first official match was played between Haladás and Ferencvárosi TC in the 2017-18 Nemzeti Bajnokság I season.

== Honours ==
- Nemzeti Bajnokság II
  - Winners (10): 1938–39, 1941–42, 1944–45, 1961–62, 1972–73, 1980–81, 1990–91, 1992–93, 1994–95, 2007–08
  - Runners-up (1): 2002–03
- Magyar Kupa
  - Runners-up (3): 1974–75, 1992–93, 2001–02

== Players ==
As of 16 February 2024. Note: Flags indicate national team as defined under FIFA eligibility rules; some limited exceptions apply. Players may hold more than one non-FIFA nationality.

No.	Pos.	Nation	Player
4	MF	SRB	Vanja Zvekanov
5	MF	HUN	György Hursán
6	MF	HUN	Attila Szakály
7	MF	HUN	Barnabás Mohos
8	DF	HUN	Marcell Frák
10	MF	ROU	Carlo Erdei
15	DF	HUN	Bonifác Csonka
17	MF	HUN	Kornél Csernik
19	FW	HUN	István Katona
21	FW	HUN	Rajmund Horváth
22	DF	HUN	Gergő Bolla
26	DF	HUN	Márk Jagodics

No.	Pos.	Nation	Player
27	DF	HUN	Vince Nyíri
33	MF	HUN	Arnold Horváth
45	FW	SVK	Marko Kelemen (on loan from Ružomberok)
70	MF	HUN	András Jancsó
73	DF	SRB	Zoran Beronja (on loan from Szeged)
77	FW	HUN	Dániel Szvoboda
78	MF	HUN	Barnabás Rácz
86	GK	HUN	Donát Pálfi
87	GK	HUN	István Verpecz
88	FW	HUN	Ármin Szijjártó
95	FW	HUN	Attila Pintér
99	DF	HUN	Patrik Tarján

=== Out on loan ===
Note: Flags indicate national team as defined under FIFA eligibility rules; some limited exceptions apply. Players may hold more than one non-FIFA nationality.

No.	Pos.	Nation	Player
—	FW	HUN	Rajmund Molnár (at MTK Budapest until 30 June 2024)

== In European football ==
Season	Competition	Round	Country	Club	Home	Away	Aggregate
1975–76	UEFA Cup Winners' Cup	1. Round	(Malta)	Valletta	7–0	1–1	8–1
1975–76	UEFA Cup Winners' Cup	2. Round	(Austria)	Sturm Graz	1–1	0–2	1–3
1981–82	Mitropa Cup		(Socialist Federal Republic of Yugoslavia)	Osijek	4–2	0–3	4–5
1981–82	Mitropa Cup		(Italy)	AC Milan	0–1	0–2	0–3
1981–82	Mitropa Cup		(Czechoslovakia)	TJ Vítkovice	2–2	1–6	3–8
1988	UEFA Intertoto Cup	Group 5	(Switzerland)	Young Boys	3–1	0–4	3–5
1988	UEFA Intertoto Cup	Group 5	(Czechoslovakia)	DAC Dunajská Streda	0–0	0–3	0–3
1988	UEFA Intertoto Cup	Group 5	(Sweden)	IFK Norrköping	0–1	0–0	0–1
2009–10	UEFA Europa League	1. Round	(Kazakhstan)	Irtysh Pavlodar	1–0	1–2	2–2(a)
2009–10	UEFA Europa League	2. Round	(Sweden)	Elfsborg	0–0	0–3	0–3

== See also ==
- List of Szombathelyi Haladás managers
- List of Szombathelyi Haladás seasons
