= Lajos Dimény =

Hungarian football manager

Personal information
- Date of birth: 22 February 1898
- Place of birth: Budapest, Hungary
- Date of death: 25 June 1983

Managerial career
- Years: Team
- 1923-1928: Savona
- 1930-1931: Ravenna
- 1935-1936: Ravenna
- 1939-1942: Ferencváros
- 1946-1947: Ferencváros
- 1947: Mogürt

Lajos Dimény (born 22 February 1898, died 25 June 1983) was a Hungarian professional football manager and former player.

== Managerial career ==
=== Savona ===
Between 1923 and 1928 he managed Savona FBC.

=== L'Aquilla ===
Between 1923 and 1933, he was the coach of L'Aquila 1927.

=== Ravenna ===
Between 1930 and 1932 he managed Ravenna FC in the third division. He returned to Ravenna and he managed the club between 1935 and 1936.

=== Ferencváros ===
In October 1939, he was appointed as the manager of Ferencvárosi TC.

He won two Hungarian league titles with Ferencváros. He won the 1939–40 Nemzeti Bajnokság I season with Ferencváros. Both Ferencváros and MTK Budapest FC collected 39 points; however, Ferencváros' goal difference was superior to MTK; therefore, Ferencváros won the league title.
