= 1937–38 Nemzeti Bajnokság I =

Nemzeti Bajnokság I
- Season: 1937–38
- Champions: Ferencvárosi TC
- Relegated: Törekvés SE; Győri ETO; Budai 11 FC

Statistics of Nemzeti Bajnokság I in the 1937–38 season.

== Overview ==
It was contested by 14 teams, and Ferencvárosi TC won the championship.

== League standings ==
Pos	Team	Pld	W	D	L	GF	GA	GR	Pts
1	Ferencvárosi TC	26	23	1	2	95	38	2.500	47
2	Újpest FC	26	21	2	3	90	32	2.813	44
3	MTK Hungária FC	26	18	4	4	86	32	2.688	40
4	Kispest AC	26	15	1	10	72	59	1.220	31
5	Elektromos FC	26	11	6	9	51	49	1.041	28
6	Phöbus FC	26	11	3	12	57	56	1.018	25
7	Nemzeti SC	26	9	6	11	61	71	0.859	24
8	Szeged FC	26	10	3	13	42	49	0.857	23
9	Szürketaxi FC	26	8	6	12	56	63	0.889	22
10	Budafok FC	26	10	2	14	43	49	0.878	22
11	Bocskai FC	26	9	2	15	43	57	0.754	20
12	Törekvés SE	26	7	4	15	49	80	0.613	18
13	Győri ETO FC	26	3	5	18	24	83	0.289	11
14	Budai 11	26	3	3	20	28	79	0.354	9

Source: rsssf.com
Rules for classification: 1) points; 2) goal ratio.

== Results ==
Home \ Away	BOC	BFC	B11	ELE	FTC	GYŐ	HUN	KIS	NEM	PHÖ	SZE	SZÜ	TÖR	ÚJP
Bocskai		4–1	1–0	6–6	0–5	1–0	2–0	0–3	1–4	4–1	2–0	0–1	5–0	0–1
Budafok	3–1		2–2	5–1	1–2	0–2	0–1	3–1	3–2	4–1	0–1	2–0	5–1	0–1
Budai 11	0–2	1–0		2–2	0–3	1–2	1–10	1–3	2–6	0–5	0–3	3–2	0–3	0–4
Elektromos	5–2	3–0	1–1		1–5	5–2	1–1	1–2	4–0	2–1	2–1	1–1	4–1	1–2
Ferencváros	3–2	5–2	3–1	2–1		5–1	3–3	4–3	5–4	5–0	1–0	4–3	12–1	3–1
Győr	1–4	0–3	0–3	1–1	0–1		1–0	2–4	1–1	2–2	0–1	0–0	0–0	0–7
Hungária	4–0	3–0	2–0	4–1	0–1	12–3		2–0	2–2	2–2	4–1	7–0	5–1	3–2
Kispest	5–1	2–3	4–2	1–0	1–2	5–2	3–1		1–1	2–0	7–2	5–4	3–2	1–5
Nemzeti	1–0	2–2	7–6	2–1	3–6	3–1	1–2	2–1		3–2	3–3	3–2	0–0	2–3
Phöbus	4–1	2–0	3–0	1–2	1–3	4–0	1–5	3–2	4–2		3–2	2–2	3–1	1–2
Szeged FC	2–0	1–2	2–0	0–2	3–1	4–1	1–3	3–1	4–1	0–2		2–0	1–5	1–3
Szürketaxi	2–2	3–2	2–1	0–1	2–3	6–1	2–3	3–6	3–2	4–3	2–0		6–1	0–3
Törekvés	3–2	2–0	6–1	1–2	0–6	3–0	2–4	2–5	5–1	2–3	2–2	3–3		2–5
Újpest	2–0	5–0	1–0	5–0	4–2	7–1	1–3	8–1	7–3	4–3	2–2	3–3	2–0	

Source: rsssf.com
Legend: Blue = home team win; Yellow = draw; Red = away team win.
