= József Mészáros =

Hungarian footballer and manager

Personal information
- Full name: József Mészáros
- Date of birth: 16 January 1923
- Place of birth: Pesterzsébet, Kingdom of Hungary
- Date of death: 21 April 1997 (aged 74)
- Place of death: Hungary
- Position: Striker

Youth career
- 1938–1940: Erzsébeti Spartacus MTK LE

Senior career*
| Years | Team | Apps | (Gls) |
| 1940–1948 | Kispest | | |
| 1948–1954 | Ferencvárosi TC | | |

International career
| 1948 | Hungary | 1 | (2) |

Managerial career
- 1956–1957: Beşiktaş J.K.
- 1957–1959: Iran
- 1961–1965: Ferencvárosi TC
- 1966–1967: Salgótarjáni BTC
- 1969–1971: Győri ETO FC
- 1971–1973: Budapest Honvéd
- * Club domestic league appearances and goals

József Mészáros (16 January 1923 – 21 April 1997) was a Hungarian footballer and football manager.
