= Sándor Bródy (footballer) =

Hungarian footballer

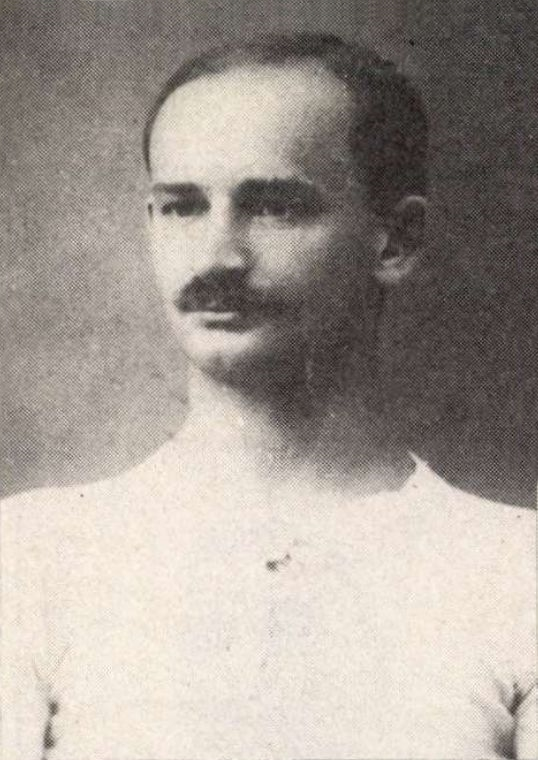
- Bródy in 1910

Personal information
- Date of birth: 15 August 1884
- Place of birth: Székelyfalva, Austria-Hungary
- Date of death: 19 April 1944 (aged 59)
- Position: Midfielder

Senior career*
Years	Team	Apps	(Gls)
1902-1914	Ferencváros	151	(17)

International career
1906–1913	Hungary	17	(1)

Managerial career
- 1921–23: IFK Göteborg
- 1937: Ferencváros
- * Club domestic league appearances and goals

Sándor Bródy (15 August 1884 – 19 April 1944) was a Jewish-Hungarian football (soccer) player. He competed for Hungary at the 1912 Olympics and was a star in the national side. His first appearance in Ferencvaros was in 1902 and he played in the starting lineup until 1914.

He took part in the First World War in the Austro-Hungarian army, and in March 1915 he was captured by the Russian Army in the Polish city of Przemyśl and spent the rest of the war in the Russian prison camp at Berezovka on the river Ob in Siberia.

He played in 17 matches for the Hungary national side and scored once (1906–1913). Later he worked as a coach for Swedish side IFK Goteborg (1921–1923) and for his former club, Ferencváros (1937). During the Second World War, he was arrested along with other Jews during the Nazi occupation of Hungary and subsequently murdered.
