= Zoltán Blum =

Hungarian footballer

Personal information
- Date of birth: 3 January 1892
- Place of birth: Pápa, Austria-Hungary
- Date of death: 25 December 1959 (aged 67)
- Place of death: Budapest, Hungary
- Position: Midfielder

Youth career
- 1905–1911: Ferencvárosi TC

Senior career*
Years	Team	Apps	(Gls)
1911–1927	Ferencvárosi TC	222	(2)

International career
1912–1925	Hungary	38	(1)

Managerial career
- 1930–1937: Ferencváros
- 1937: CA Oradea
- 1947: UTA Arad
- * Club domestic league appearances and goals

Zoltán Blum (also known as Zoltán Virág; 3 January 1892 – 25 December 1959) was a Hungarian amateur football (soccer) player who competed in the 1912 Summer Olympics.

== Life ==
Blum was born in Pápa. He was a member of the Hungarian Olympic squad and played two matches in the consolation tournament. He was also part of the team at the 1924 Summer Olympics but did not play. He died in Budapest, aged 67.
