= 1936–37 Nemzeti Bajnokság I =

Nemzeti Bajnokság I
- Season: 1936–37
- Champions: MTK Hungária FC
- Relegated: Szombathelyi Haladás VSE; III. Kerület FC; Erzsébet-Soroksár FC

Statistics of Nemzeti Bajnokság I in the 1936–37 season.

== Overview ==
It was contested by 14 teams, and MTK Hungária FC won the championship.

== League standings ==
Pos	Team	Pld	W	D	L	GF	GA	GR	Pts
1	MTK Hungária FC	26	20	3	3	95	34	2.794	43
2	Ferencvárosi TC	26	20	2	4	102	32	3.188	42
3	Újpest FC	26	17	3	6	101	39	2.590	37
4	Phöbus FC	26	17	2	7	54	31	1.742	36
5	Nemzeti SC	26	14	4	8	48	42	1.143	32
6	Bocskai FC	26	13	3	10	57	49	1.163	29
7	Elektromos FC	26	11	6	9	52	48	1.083	28
8	Szeged FC	26	8	10	8	40	51	0.784	26
9	Budai 11	26	8	7	11	44	59	0.746	23
10	Kispest AC	26	8	5	13	62	78	0.795	21
11	Budafok FC	26	8	5	13	47	87	0.540	21
12	Szombathelyi Haladás	26	6	4	16	38	79	0.481	16
13	III. Kerületi TUE	26	3	2	21	16	90	0.178	8
14	Soroksár FC	26	0	2	24	14	51	0.275	2

Source: rsssf.com

== Results ==
Home \ Away	KER	BOC	BFC	B11	ELE	FTC	HAL	HUN	KIS	NEM	PHÖ	SOR	SZE	ÚJP
III. Kerület		0–5	1–2	0–1	-:+ (Note: The match was settled with a goalless win.)	1–2	1–0	2–8	0–2	1–2	1–5	2–0	0–3	0–15
Bocskai	5–1		6–0	3–1	1–2	1–5	1–2	2–4	3–3	2–0	2–0	4–2	0–0	2–6
Budafok	2–2	2–2		2–0	5–2	0–8	2–3	2–3	2–3	0–4	2–3	4–4	1–7	0–7
Budai 11	1–0	2–1	2–7		5–1	1–6	1–3	2–7	5–1	3–3	0–0	2–2	0–0	1–3
Elektromos	7–0	4–1	1–1	1–1		2–1	0–0	1–1	3–0	1–3	1–2	3–2	4–1	1–1
Ferencváros	5–0	4–1	4–1	7–1	3–1		3–2	3–3	7–2	2–1	2–0	5–1	1–1	0–2
Haladás	4–0	1–3	0–0	2–5	0–2	2–7		3–5	1–5	1–2	1–4	2–1	2–2	1–6
Hungária	4–0	4–1	0–1	1–1	5–1	3–0	5–0		7–3	4–2	4–1	0–0	1–2	3–4
Kispest	3–1	1–2	7–2	2–2	2–2	0–10	9–4	1–3		1–4	2–3	6–1	1–1	2–4
Nemzeti	1–1	1–3	2–3	3–2	2–1	0–3	5–1	0–3	4–2		1–0	+:-	3–3	0–2
Phöbus	7–0	2–0	4–1	2–1	5–3	3–2	1–0	0–1	3–2	0–1		4–1	0–1	2–2
Soroksár	-:+	-:+	-:+	-:+	-:+	-:+	-:+	-:+	-:+	-:+	-:+		-:+	-:+
Szeged FC	3–1	0–2	2–3	2–1	0–6	1–8	2–2	1–3	1–1	1–1	0–2	4–0		1–7
Újpest	3–1	2–4	10–2	0–3	6–2	2–4	7–1	1–3	3–1	2–3	0–1	5–0	1–1	

Source: rsssf.com
Legend: Blue = home team win; Yellow = draw; Red = away team win.
