= 1927–28 Magyar Kupa =

Tournament details
- Country: Hungary

Final positions
- Champions: Ferencváros FC
- Runners-up: Attila FC

The 1927–28 Magyar Kupa (English: Hungarian Cup) was the 11th season of Hungary's annual knock-out cup football competition.

== Final ==
24 June 1928
17:30 (UTC+2)

Ferencváros FC	5–1	Attila FC
Kohut 22', 60', 66'; Szedlacsek 80'; Turay 89'	Report	Riff 51'

Üllői úti stadion, Budapest
Attendance: 8,000
Referee: László Szél (Hungary)

== See also ==
- 1927–28 Nemzeti Bajnokság I
