= Somogy FC =

Hungarian football club (1926–1936)

- Full name: Somogy Football Club
- Founded: 1926
- Dissolved: 1936
- Ground: Dózsa-pálya, Kaposvár
| Home colours | Away colours |

Somogy FC was a Hungarian professional association football club from Kaposvár, the seat of Somogy County. Formed in 1926, when professional football was introduced in Hungary, it spent six seasons in the Hungarian top division between 1928 and 1935 and twice won the second division. In 1935 the club merged with Pécs-Baranya FC to form Somogy-Baranya FC, which folded a year later.

== History ==
=== Origins and foundation ===
Football in Kaposvár began with Kaposvári AC (KAC), Somogy County's first club, which laid out its ground at the start of the 20th century in the courtyard of what is now the Táncsics Mihály High School and played in the Pécs subdivision of the Transdanubian district before the First World War.

When the professional game reached Hungary in 1926, two struggling local clubs, Kaposvári MÁV TE and the Donnervárosi Levente club, merged to revive KAC; the local paper Új-Somogy announced the revival on 25 July 1926, and the new club was placed in the professional second division. At a board meeting in the Korona Hotel the professional team took the name Somogy FC and the colours red and black, and it financed itself by inviting the public to subscribe to cooperative shares of 72 pengő. Somogy drew its first league match 1–1 at home to Erzsébetváros on 29 August 1926.

=== Top-division years ===
Somogy finished fifth in its first second-division season and won the division a year later, taking promotion to the top flight. Led by the former Ferencváros international Zoltán Blum as player-coach, the club won its first top-division match 2–1 away to Bástya in Szeged and finished its debut 1928–29 season eighth of the twelve clubs.

Somogy finished last in 1929–30 and was relegated, but returned at the first attempt as 1930–31 second-division champion, with Pál Jávor, signed from Újpest, scoring 54 goals. Back in the top flight, the club finished seventh in 1931–32, a season that also brought a 10–1 defeat by Ferencváros.

The 1932–33 season ended in a legal battle. Somogy had refused to start a match in Soroksár because no police were present; the dispute over the fixture went from the mayor of Budapest, who found for Soroksár, to the Ministry of the Interior, which ruled for Somogy. Somogy therefore contested the promotion–relegation play-off as the second-from-bottom club, and stayed up by beating Vasas 3–0 away and 5–2 at home, while Soroksár went down. A year later the club again survived through the relegation round, beating Erzsébeti TC 2–0 in both legs.

In 1934–35 Somogy won only one match, 2–1 against III. Kerület, and finished last with six points. Its final top-division match, a 1–1 draw with Budai 11 on Üllői út on 30 May 1935, drew only 250 spectators; Ferenc Kollár scored the club's last top-flight goal.

=== Merger and dissolution ===
The city could no longer carry the club's financial burden, and in 1935 Somogy merged with Pécs-Baranya FC to form Somogy-Baranya FC, which played in Pécs. The merged club finished second in the 1935–36 second division and was dissolved in 1936 for financial reasons.

Kaposvár waited four decades for its next top-division club, Rákóczi. The two clubs are connected: alongside its professional team, KAC had launched an amateur side in 1926, and that team merged into Rákóczi eight years later.

== Name changes ==
- 1926: formed from the merger of Kaposvári MÁV TE and Donnervárosi Levente as Kaposvári AC, entering the league as Somogy FC
- 1926–1935: Somogy FC
- 1935: merged with Pécs-Baranya FC
- 1935–1936: Somogy-Baranya FC
- 1936: dissolved

== Honours ==
- Nemzeti Bajnokság II:
  - Winners (2): 1927–28, 1930–31
