= Miskolci AK =

Hungarian football club

- Full name: Miskolci Atléta Kör
- Founded: 1926
- Ground: Borsod Volán Stadion
- Capacity: 4,800
Home colours	Away colours

Miskolci Atléta Kör or Miskolci Attila Futball Club was a Hungarian football club from the town of Miskolc.

== History ==
A hundred years ago, the city of Miskolc—and, more broadly, the region of northeastern Hungary—did not want to be left out of the newly emerging professional soccer scene. At first, it seemed that the new team could be formed from the local railway team—the Miskolci VSC was the best in the region at the time—but the Magyar Állam Vasutak (Hungarian State Railways) executive board did not allow the amateur club to turn professional. The Miskolc Athletic Club eventually took on the task; in July 1926, at a board meeting of the association, the new, now professional-level team was founded under the name Attila.

“We are striving to put together as strong a team as possible; however, since revenue prospects will not be very promising at first, the real team will only come together later. It is also very important that we receive adequate support from the city. By this I do not mean financial support, but rather understanding and goodwill, with which they will address our formation and, later, the issue of the stadium,” said one of the MAK officials to the Miskolci Napló.

Attila was placed in the professional second division, leaving just over a month to assemble the roster before the start of the season. In January, the Borsod-based team added the outstanding forward Antal Siklóssy, who had returned from Vienna. The red-and-blues performed brilliantly in their first season; a veritable soccer fever broke out in the city, and at times the Népkerti field proved too small. On May 16, 1927, a last-minute goal against Somogy FC secured a victory and, at the same time, the championship title, as their lead had by then become insurmountable.

Before their final league match against Terézváros, the team members organized a lantern parade accompanied by a band in Miskolc, followed by a serenade for the city’s mayor, Dr. Sándor Hodobay. After the match, which ended in a 4-1 home victory, the Siklóssy team celebrated with a banquet for two hundred guests, during which they read aloud the congratulatory telegram from Nemzeti Sport and even sent a reply. “Today, our editorial office received a very kind and warm thank-you letter from the championship club, in which they promise to continue working with the same dedication for Hungarian sports as they have until now, if only to demonstrate that even in an oppressed region there is strength and will,” our newspaper reported on the reaction.

In the mid-1920s, the municipal government and local community of Miskolc facilitated the construction of a sports complex with a 10,000-spectator capacity, funded at a cost of one billion crowns. The project was accompanied by a surge in local support for the Attila Football Club. Contemporary reports in Nemzeti Sport documented the team's significant influence on local culture, noting the widespread adoption of the club's red-and-blue colors in fashion and the popularity of the team's anthem among residents.

The song in question went like this (to the tune of “Fel, fel vitézek”): “Up, up goes Attila into battle, / To the pinnacle of the professional league. / The ball is already bouncing out on the field, / ‘Go, Attila!’—the crowd chants.”

The team, which had made it to the top flight, was joined in the summer by the Italian league’s top scorer, the Austrian Anton Powolny; however, the striker, signed from Inter, managed only five goals in the professional First Division, and Attila was the last to be let go. Some consolation came from the fact that they became the first provincial team to reach the cup final, eliminating Hungária, III. Kerület, and Bocskai along the way! In the final, the red-and-blue squad faced Ferencváros, on Üllői út.

Attila fought with everything they had, but not only Ferencváros FC, but also the refereeing made things difficult for the Miskolc team. However, “the refereeing triumvirate, whose offside calls were scandalous,” stopped numerous attacks—incorrectly, in our opinion. Early in the second half, Attila equalized off a corner kick, but Ferencváros regained the lead shortly thereafter, also following a corner kick.

However, the Miskolc players believed the referee had incorrectly awarded a corner kick, so Antal Pruha and Powolny first protested and then walked off the field. The visitors’ coach, József Nagy, tried to get them to return to the field, but a member of Attila’s board of directors in the stands ordered them to walk off, whereupon the referee sent off both players. With a two-man advantage, Ferencváros scored three more goals.

After the match, which ended with a 5-1 final score, referee László Széll was also interviewed by Nemzeti Sport: “When the Miskolc players surrounded me and tried to intimidate me, Powolny came over to them and said, ‘Come on, leave him alone! What are you talking to him for?’ And he made a dismissive hand gesture. That’s why I had to send him off. Then Pruha ran up to me and said, ‘He’s right! Why don’t you send me off too?’ Of course, I granted his request as well.”

In the late 1920s, the Miskolc team fluctuated between the first and second divisions from season to season, but by the first half of the 1930s, it had solidified its position in the top flight, although it finished in the top ten only twice—eighth in 1932 and ninth a year later. In the spring of 1934, the team managed to stay up after a heroic fight, which required a draw in a rematch at Kispest’s home stadium due to a fire and a 1-0 victory over Nemzeti SC.

In the summer of 1935, the team’s goalkeeper, Ferenc Buzássy, left to continue his career at Real Madrid; moreover, he was reunited with a former teammate, Gyula Alberti—who had played for Attila between 1932 and 1933—at the Royal Club.

Miskolci AK debuted in the 1931–32 season of the Hungarian League when it finished eighth.

By that point, Attila could only retain its first-division status through a playoff, but for a time it seemed that, due to outstanding debts, Nemzeti FC might still be allowed to compete in the league, which had since been renamed the National Championship. However, even though they had already played two rounds of the championship, the Minister of the Interior decided that Attila could compete in the NB, while Nemzeti was relegated. Two points were deducted from Miskolc’s total, but they would have finished last regardless, as they won only once all season, against Törekvés. Only eight hundred spectators turned out for that match…

Although the struggling club began the following season in the second division, and for a time it seemed that a new team might be formed in its place under the name Miskolc FC, the dissolution of the professional team was announced on August 28, 1936. “The dissolution of Attila means that professional soccer has also died in Miskolc, since there can now be no question of Miskolc FC continuing to play,” concluded the Felsőmagyarországi Reggeli Hírlap, drawing the sad conclusion. “After Attila’s promising start, the team’s performance declined steadily, the main reason being that its players lost all connection to the city, and the team was Miskolc only in name, but not in substance. The fans—who, incidentally, lost their direct connection to the team in Miskolc as well, coinciding with the collapse of professional soccer across the board—saw this interest and attendance suffer. Attila ran into financial trouble and was unable to recover from it until very recently,” the paper summarized.

However, the region did not remain without top-tier soccer for long; in 1940, in Diósgyőr—which was still an independent municipality at the time—the combined team of the steelworkers, DiMÁVAG (Diósgyőri VTK), also sporting red-and-blue colors, competed in the top division.

== Name Changes ==
- 1926: Miskolci Atléta Kör
- 1926–1936: Miskolci Attila Kör/Attila FC
- 1936: dissolved
- 1936–1939: Miskolci Attila FC
- 1939–1940: Miskolci LESOK

== Honours ==
- Nemzeti Bajnokság II:
  - Winners (1): 1926–27
- Hungarian Cup:
  - Runner-up (1): 1927–28
