= List of winners of Nemzeti Bajnokság III =

601 A national third tier of Hungarian league football was established in 1981, as Nemzeti Bajnokság III. The current champions are Mosonmagyaróvár, Nagykanizsa, Karcag, and Tiszakécske by winning the last edition (2024–25) of the championship.

== Nemzeti Bajnokság III (1940–present) ==
	Year		Winner	Runner-up	Third place	Ref
1.	1940–41	West	Újpesti TE II	Hungária SC	Érsekújvári SE	
1.	1940–41	North (Carpathian)	Nyíregyházi TVE	Munkácsi SE	Ungvári AC	
1.	1940–41	North (Mátra)	Losonci AFC	Hatvani VSE	DiMÁVAG II	
1.	1940–41	South	Goldberger SE	Budapesti Rákosmenti SC	Kőbányai TK	
1.	1940–41	East	Ferencvárosi TC II	WMTK II	Testvériség SE	
2.	1941–42	Alföld	WMTK II	Makói VSE	Magyar Pamut SC	
2.	1941–42	Hargita	Marosvásárhelyi NMKTK	Székelyföldi MÁV	Székelyudvarhelyi Hargita	
2.	1941–42	Mátra	Wekerletelepi SC	Szentlőrinci AC	Kőbányai TK	
2.	1941–42	Transdanubia (North)	Újpesti TE II	Pápai Perutz SC	Alba Regia AK	
2.	1941–42	Transdanubia (South)	Kaposvári Rákóczi AC	Kábelgyári SC	Hangya SE	
2.	1941–42	Upper Hungary	Kassai VSC	Ungvári AC	Királyházi MÁV	
3.	1942–43	Alföld	Újszegedi TC	Bácska Szabadkai AC	Békéscsabai MÁV SE	
3.	1942–43	Buda	Komáromi AC	Ferencvárosi TC II	Székesfehérvári MÁV Előre TK	
3.	1942–43	Danube-Tisza Interfluve	Újpest-Rákospalotai AK (URAK)	Ceglédi MOVE SE	Jászberényi Lehel AC	
3.	1942–43	Hargita (North)	Marosvásárhelyi Attila	Szászrégeni Turul SE	Marosvásárhelyi MÁV II	
3.	1942–43	Hargita (South)	Székelyudvarhelyi Hargita	Sepsiszentgyörgyi Textil SE	Sepsiszentgyörgyi Korvin SE	
3.	1942–43	Mátra	Újpesti TE II	Weisz Manfréd TK	Salgótarjáni SE	
3.	1942–43	Transdanubia	Felten SC	Dombovári Vasutas SE	Pécsi BTC	
3.	1942–43	Upper Tisza	Munkácsi LSE	Aknaszlatinai Bányász TE	MÁV Sátoraljaújhelyi AC	
4.	1943–44	Alföld	Cikta LE Martfű	Csabai AK	Szegedi HASE	
4.	1943–44	Bácska	Szabadkai AFC	Bácska Szabadkai AC	MOVE Zombori TK	
4.	1943–44	Buda	Székesfehérvári MÁV Előre TK	Wesselényi Miklós SE	Pesterzsébeti Kossuth Munkás SE	
4.	1943–44	Danube	Dorogi AC	MOVE TE	VI. kerületi SC	
4.	1943–44	Kolzsvár	Kolozsvári AC II	Kolozsvári MTE	Dési MÁV TSE	
4.	1943–44	Mátra	Hatvani VSE	Losoncapátfalvai TSE	Salgótarjáni BTC II	
4.	1943–44	Pest	KISTEXT SK	Ceglédi MOVE TSE	Kispesti AC	
4.	1943–44	Southwest	Nagykanizsai Vasutas TE	Kaposvári Turul SE	Nagykanizsai Zrinyi MTE	
4.	1943–44	Subcarpathia	Kassai VSC	MOVE Szabolcs	MÁV Sátoraljaújhelyi AC	
4.	1943–44	Szamos	Nagyváradi Törekvés NMK	Nagyváradi MÁV TK	Szatmári Törekvés SE	
4.	1943–44	Transdanubia	Komáromi FC	Újpest FC II	II. kerületi SC (Győr)	
4.	1943–44	Transylvania (North)	Székelyudvarhelyi Hargita	Marosvásárhelyi NMTK II	Székelyföldi MÁV II	
4.	1943–44	Transylvania (South)	Sepsiszentgyörgyi SE	Sepsiszentgyörgyi Textil SE	Gyergyószentmiklósi SE	
5.	1948–49	Bírő Dezső	Dohánygyári Lendület	Húsos SC	Szentlőrinci Tégla FC	
5.	1948–49	Debrecen-Nyíregyháza	Kisvárdai ÖSE	Nyírbátori SzIT SE	Debreceni Postás SE	
5.	1948–49	Győr-Szombathely	Soproni FAC	Veszprémi Vasas TC	Kapuvári SzSE	
5.	1948–49	Lénárt	Magyar Pamut SC	Kerámia SE	Magyar Posztógyári SE	
5.	1948–49	Miskolc-Salgótarján	Sajószentpéteri BTK	Zagyvapálfalvai SE	Borsodnádasdi Lemezgyári Vasas SK	
5.	1948–49	Pécs-Kaposvár	Kaposvári Rákóczi AC	Dombóvári VSE	Komlói SE	
5.	1948–49	Pestvidék-Székesfehérvár	Várpalotai MTE	Tokodi Üveggyári SC	Fehérvári DSE	
5.	1948–49	Szeged-Kiskunhalas	Kiskunhalasi VSE	Kiskunfélegyházi MTK	Móravárosi ÉDOSz	
5.	1948–49	Szolnok-Békéscsaba	Ceglédi VAOSZ	Martfűi Cikta	Sarkadi MSE	
6.	1949–50	Bíró Dezső	Magyar Posztógyári SE	Dunakeszi Vasutas SK	Láng Gépgyár SK	
6.	1949–50	Debrecen-Nyíregyháza	Nyíregyházi Elektromos	Püspökladányi VSK	Nagykállói DSE	
6.	1949–50	Győr-Szombathely	Szombathelyi Szakszervezeti MTE	Kőszegi Nemez Posztógyári SE	Szombathelyi Postás SK	
6.	1949–50	Lénárt	Csepeli Papír SC	Újlaki FC	Törekvés SE	
6.	1949–50	Miskolc-Salgótarján	Egri Erdőgazdasági SzTK	Selypi ÉDOSZ	Szerencsi ÉDOSz	
6.	1949–50	Pécs-Kaposvár	Komlói Tárna SE	Dombóvári Vasutas SK	Pécsbányatelepi Tárna	
6.	1949–50	Pestvidék-Székesfehérvár	Ceglédi VSK	Tatabányai ISE MÉMOSZ	Fűzfői Lombik	
6.	1949–50	Szeged-Kiskunhalas	Szegedi Honvéd SE	Móravárosi ÉDOSz	Bajai SzAK	
6.	1949–50	Szolnok-Békéscsaba	Gyulai SzSE	Sarkadi SzMSE	Mezőtúri SzSE	
7.	1950	Bíró	Magyar Textil SE	Rákospalotai Növényolaj	Zsolnay MSE	
7.	1950	Debrecen-Nyíregyháza	Debreceni Honvéd	Berettyóújfalui Határőr	Nagykállói SzDSE	
7.	1950	Győr-Szombathely	Győri SzMTE	Kőszegi Nemez Posztógyári SE	Soproni Sotex SE	
7.	1950	Lénárt	ÉDOSz Húsos	Autótaxi MSC	Hungária SC	
7.	1950	Miskolc-Salgótarján	Miskolci Honvéd SE	Borsodnádasdi Vasas SK	Gyöngyösi SzSE	
7.	1950	Pécs-Kaposvár	Pécsbányatelepi Tárna	Dombóvári VSK	Szászvári Tárna	
7.	1950	Pestvidék-Székesfehérvár	Székesfehérvári Lokomotív	Siófoki Építők	Várpalotai Tárna	
7.	1950	Szeged-Kiskunhalas	Kiskunfélegyházi SzTK	Szegedi Dózsa SC	Makói VSK	
7.	1950	Szolnok-Békéscsaba	Tótkomlósi DISz MTK	Orosházi SzMTK	Martfűi BDSE	
8.	1957–58	West	Pápai Textiles SE	Szombathelyi Vasas SC	Kapuvári SE	
8.	1957–58	Southwest	Bajai Bácska Posztó SE	Pécsi BTC	Pécsi VSK	
8.	1957–58	North	Diósgyőri Bányász	Ormosbányai Bányász SK	Petőfibányai Bányász SK	
8.	1957–58	Central Danubia	Nyergesújfalui Viscosa SE	Esztergomi Vasas SC	Péceli MÁV AC	
8.	1957–58	South	Kecskeméti TE	Bácsalmás Petőfi VSE	Kiskunfélegyházi Építők	
8.	1957–58	Northern Budapest	Elektromos Művek TE	Budapest-Rákosfalvi EMERGÉ SC	TRANSVILL SK	
8.	1957–58	Southern Budapest	Erzsébeti Munkás TK	Törekvés SE	Vörös Csillag Traktorgyár SK	
8.	1957–58	East	Debreceni GÖCS Vasas	Nyíregyházi SZSE	Kisvárdai SE	
8.	1957–58	Southeast	Szolnoki Munkás TE	Martfűi MSE	Orosházi Kinizsi SK	
9.	1958–59	Northwest	Pápai Textiles SE	Kapuvári SE	Soproni VSE	
9.	1958–59	Southwest	Kaposvári MTE	Pécsi Bányász SC	Bajai Építők SK	
9.	1958–59	North	Nagybátonyi Bányász SC	Vasas Dinamó	Baglyasaljai Bányász	
9.	1958–59	North-centre	Erzsébeti Vasas TK	Elektromos SE	Vörös Csillag Traktorgyár SK	
9.	1958–59	Northeast	Diósgyőri Bányász SK	Martfűi MSE	Debreceni EAC	
9.	1958–59	Southeast	Orosházi Kinizsi SK	Kecskeméti TE	Makói Vasas SK	
10.	1959–60	Northwest	Ganz-MÁVAG Vasas SE	Soproni VSE	KISTEXT SK	
10.	1959–60	Southwest	Pécsi BTC	Kaposvári Kinizsi SK	Csepel Autó SE	
10.	1959–60	North	Kőbányai Lombik TK	Salgótarjáni Kohász SE	Vasas Ikarus SK	
10.	1959–60	Northcentre	Elektromos SE	Vörös Csillag Traktorgyár SK	Nyergesújfalui Viscosa SE	
10.	1959–60	Northeast	Nyíregyházi Spartacus SK	Egri Vasas	Debreceni EAC	
10.	1959–60	Southeast	Ceglédi VSE	Szegedi Spartacus-Vasas SC	Gyulai MEDOSZ	
11.	1960–61	Northwest	Soproni VSE	MÁV DAC Győr	Pápai Textiles SE	
11.	1960–61	Southwest	Kaposvári Kinizsi SK	Kaposvári MTE	Bajai Bácska Posztó SE	
11.	1960–61	North	KISTEXT SK	Salgótarjáni Kohász SE	Nagybátonyi Bányász SC	
11.	1960–61	North-centre	Traktorgyári SE	III. kerületi TTVE	Szentendrei Honvéd SE	
11.	1960–61	Northeast	Debreceni EAC	Debreceni Gördülőcsapágygyár	Miskolci Bányász	
11.	1960–61	Southeast	Szegedi Építők SK	Gyulai MEDOSZ	Szolnoki MTE	
12.	1961–62	Northwest	MÁV-DAC	Pápai Textiles SE	Győri Dózsa SE	
12.	1961–62	Southwest	Pécsi VSK	Pécsi BTC	Székesfehérvári MÁV Előre SC	
12.	1961–62	North	Salgótarjáni Kohász SE	Nagybátonyi Bányász SC	Baglyasaljai Bányász	
12.	1961–62	North-centre	Csepel Autó SE	Szentendrei Honvéd SE	Esztergomi Vasas	
12.	1961–62	Northeast	Egri Dózsa SE	Miskolci Bányász	Nyíregyházi MTE	
12.	1961–62	Southeast	Szegedi VSE	Békéscsabai Építők SK	Szolnoki MTE	
13.	1962–63	Northwest	Győri Dózsa SE	Veszprémi Haladás-Petőfi	Pápai Textiles SE	
13.	1962–63	Southwest	Pécsi BTC	Kaposvári Honvéd SE	Pécsi Bányász SC	
13.	1962–63	North	Nagybátonyi Bányász SC	KISTEXT SK	Kisterenyei Bányász SE	
13.	1962–63	North-centre	Vörös Csillag Traktorgyár	Budapesti Vasas Izzó SK	III. Kerületi TTVE	
13.	1962–63	Northeast	Miskolci Bányász	Nyíregyházi MTE	Fővárosi Autóbusz SK	
13.	1962–63	Southeast	Szolnoki MTE	Gyulai MEDOSZ	Jászberényi Lehel SC	
14.	1963	West	III. Kerületi TTVE	Pécsi BTC	Pécsi VSK	
14.	1963	East	Egri Dózsa SE	Kecskeméti Dózsa	Szegedi VSE	
15.	1964	West	III. Kerületi TTVE	Pécsi Bányász SC	Kaposvári Honvéd SE	
15.	1964	East	Jászberényi Lehel SC	Egri Dózsa SC	Kecskeméti Dózsa SC	
16.	1965	West	Kaposvári Honvéd SE	Várpalotai Bányász SK	Budai Spartacus SC	
16.	1965	East	Egri Dózsa SC	Kecskeméti Dózsa SC	Budapesti Előre SC	
17.	1966	West	Várpalotai Bányász SK	Fővárosi Autóbusz SK	Pécsi Bányász SE	
17.	1966	East	Budapesti Spartacus SC	Kecskeméti Dózsa SC	Budapesti Előre SC	
18.	1967	West	Győri Dózsa SK	Zalaegerszegi TE	Veszprémi Vegyész SC	
18.	1967	Centre	Nagybátonyi Bányász SC	III. kerületi TTVE	Esztergomi Vasas	
18.	1967	East	Szolnoki MTE	Szegedi VSE	Budai Spartacus SC	
19.	1968	West	Zalaegerszegi TE	MÁV DAC	Dorogi Bányász SC	
19.	1968	Centre	Székesfehérvári MÁV Előre SC	Salgótarjáni Kohász SE	Borsodi Bányász SK	
19.	1968	East	Békéscsabai Előre SC	Szolnoki MÁV SE	Ceglédi VSE	
20.	1969	West	MÁV DAC	Savaria Cipőgyár	Dorogi Bányász SC	
20.	1969	North	Budapesti VSC	Volán SC	Kossuth KFSE	
20.	1969	East	Debreceni VSC	Jászberényi Lehel SC	Budafoki MTE Kinizsi	
21.	1970	West	Pécsi Ércbányász SC	Szekszárdi Dózsa SE	Bakony Vegyész TC	
21.	1970	North	Volán SC	Kazincbarcikai Vegyész SE	Salgótarjáni Kohász SE	
21.	1970	East	Szolnoki MÁV SE	Pénzügyőr SE	Ceglédi VSE	
22.	1970–71	West	Dorogi Bányász SC	Szekszárdi Dózsa SE	Pécsi Ércbányász SC	
22.	1970–71	North	Volán SC	Nagybátonyi Bányász SC	Vasas Izzó SK	
22.	1970–71	East	Pénzügyőr SE	Ceglédi VSE	Szegedi Dózsa SC	
23.	1971–72	West	Szekszárdi Dózsa SE	NIKE Fűzfői AK	Győri Dózsa SE	
23.	1971–72	North	Miskolci VSC	Nagybátonyi Bányász SC	Budapesti VSC	
23.	1971–72	East	BKV Előre SC	Budafoki MTE Kinizsi	Kiskunhalasi MEDOSZ	
24.	1972–73	West	Olajbányász SE	Győri Dózsa SE	Pécsi VSK	
24.	1972–73	North	Kossuth KFSE	Kazincbarcikai Vegyész SE	Budapesti VSC	
24.	1972–73	East	Budafoki MTE Kinizsi	Fősped Szállítók	Szegedi Dózsa SE	
25.	1973–74	West	Kaposvári Rákóczi SC	NIKE Fűzfői AK	BKV Előre SC	
25.	1973–74	North	Ózdi Kohász SE	Budapesti VSC	Kazincbarcikai Vegyész SE	
25.	1973–74	East	FŐSPED Szállítók SE	Volán SC	Honvéd Szabó Lajos SE	
26.	1974–75	Northwest	KOMÉP SC Tatabánya	Bábolnai SE	Váci Híradás SE	
26.	1974–75	Southwest	Budapesti VSC	Pécsi VSK	BKV Előre SC	
26.	1974–75	Northeast	Nagybátonyi Bányász SC	Debreceni MTE	Nyíregyházi Spartacus Petőfi SC	
26.	1974–75	Southeast	Vasas Izzó	Kecskeméti SC	Szolnoki MÁV SE	
27.	1975–76	Northwest	NIKE Fűzfői AK	Váci Híradás SE	Ajkai Alumínium SK	
27.	1975–76	Southwest	Ganz-MÁVAG SE	Székesfehérvári MÁV Előre SC	BKV Előre SC	
27.	1975–76	Northeast	Egri Dózsa SE	Ózdi Kohász SE	Debreceni MTE	
27.	1975–76	Southeast	Szolnoki MÁV SE	Szarvasi Főiskola Spartacus	Szegedi Dózsa SE	
28.	1976–77	Northwest	Váci Híradás SE	Bábolnai SE	Dunakeszi VSE	
28.	1976–77	Southwest	BKV Előre SC	Pécsi VSK	Perbáli TSZ SK	
28.	1976–77	Northeast	Kazincbarcikai Vegyész SE	Debreceni MTE	Honvéd Papp József SE	
28.	1976–77	Southeast	Békéscsabai TASK	Szegedi Dózsa	Szarvasi Főiskola Spartacus SC	
29.	1977–78	West	Pécsi VSK	Ajkai Alumínium SK	Bauxitbányász SE	
29.	1977–78	Center	Ganz-MÁVAG SE	Építők SC	Kecskeméti SC	
29.	1977–78	East	Ózdi Kohász SE	Miskolci VSC	Szarvasi Főiskola Spartacus	
	1978–1981	Megyei Bajnokság I functioned as the third league in Hungary.				
30.	1981–82	Bakony	NIKE Fűzfői AK	MOTIM TE	Győri Dózsa SE	
30.	1981–82	Dráva	Siófoki Bányász SK	Sellyei SE	Siklósi SE	
30.	1981–82	Duna	Érdi VSE	Honvéd Rákóczi SE	ÉGSZÖV-MEDOSZ SE	
30.	1981–82	Kőrös	Bajai SK	Lajosmizse FC	Délép SC	
30.	1981–82	Mátra	Nagybátonyi Bányász SC	Hatvani KVSC	Borsod Volán SE	
30.	1981–82	Tisza	Balmazújvárosi Lenin TSZ SE	Hajdúböszörményi Bocskai SE	Hajdúszoboszlói Bocskai SE	
31.	1982–83	Bakony	Bakony Vegyész TC	Honvéd Katona József SE	Répcelaki Bányász SE	
31.	1982–83	Dráva	Kaposvári Rákóczi SC	Sellyei SK	Siklósi SE	
31.	1982–83	Duna	Dunaújváros Kohász SE	Budafoki MTE	Budapesti VSC	
31.	1982–83	Kőrös	Honvéd Szabó Lajos SE	Békési SE	Délép SC	
31.	1982–83	Mátra	Honvéd Papp József SE	Lehel SC	Hatvani KVSC	
31.	1982–83	Tisza	Szolnoki MÁV MTE	Debreceni Universitas SE	Honvéd Bem József SE	
32.	1983–84	Bakony	Tapolcai Bauxitbányász SE	Sabaria SE	Ajkai Bányász SK	
32.	1983–84	Dráva	Kaposvári Rákóczi SC	Mohácsi TE	Siklósi SE	
32.	1983–84	Duna	Dunaújvárosi Kohász SE	Oroszlányi Bányász SK	Ráckevei Aranykalász TSZ SK	
32.	1983–84	Kőrös	Délép SC Szeged	BKV Előre SC	Gyulai SE	
32.	1983–84	Mátra	Váci Izzó MTE	Honvéd Papp József SE	Salgótarjáni Síküveg SE	
32.	1983–84	Tisza	Jászberényi Lehel SE	Olefin SC	Hajdúböszörményi Bocskai SE	
33.	1984–85	Bakony	MOTIM TE	Sabaria SE	Péti MTE	
33.	1984–85	Dráva	Komlói Bányász SK	Kaposvári Rákóczi SC	Mohácsi TE	
33.	1984–85	Duna	Oroszlányi Bányász SK	Építők SC	Dömsödi Dózsa TSz SK	
33.	1984–85	Kőrös	Délép SC Szeged	Kecskeméti TE	Miske TSZ SK	
33.	1984–85	Mátra	Ganz-MÁVAG SE	Hatvani KVSC	Gyöngyösi SE	
33.	1984–85	Tisza	Honvéd Szabó Lajos SE	Debreceni Universitas SE	Olefin SC	
34.	1985–86	Bakony	MÁV DAC	Péti MTE	Ajkai Bányász SK	
34.	1985–86	Dráva	Kaposvári Rákóczi SC	Mohácsi TSZ SE	Pécsi VSK	
34.	1985–86	Duna	Budafoki MTE	Építők SC	Dorogi Bányász SC	
34.	1985–86	Kőrös	Szarvasi Vasas SE	Kecskeméti SC	Orosházi MTK	
34.	1985–86	Mátra	Ózdi Kohász SE	Budapesti VSC	Honvéd Köteles Jenő SE	
34.	1985–86	Tisza	Debreceni Universitas SE	Olefin SC	Balmazújvárosi Lenin TSz SE	
35.	1986–87	Bakony	Ajkai Hungalu SK	Ajkai Bányász	Soproni SE	
35.	1986–87	Dráva	Mohácsi TSz SE	Marcali VSE	Paksi SE	
35.	1986–87	Duna	III. Kerületi TTVE	ESMTK	Dorogi Bányász SC	
35.	1986–87	Kőrös	Kecskeméti SC	Építők SC	Miskei TSZ SK	
35.	1986–87	Mátra	Kazincbarcikai Vegyész SE	Honvéd Papp József SE	Salgótarjáni Síküveg	
35.	1986–87	Tisza	Debreceni Kinizsi SE	Honvéd Szabó Lajos SE	Jászberényi Lehel SE	
36.	1987–88	Bakony	Soproni SE	Tapolca Bauxitbányász SE	Keszthelyi Haladás SC	
36.	1987–88	Dráva	Mohácsi Új Barázda TSZ SE	Csurgói Spartacus	Paksi SE	
36.	1987–88	Duna	Oroszlányi Bányász SK	Dorogi Bányász SC	Esztergomi Vasas SC	
36.	1987–88	Kőrös	Szarvasi Vasas SE	Bajai SK	Miskei TSZ SK	
36.	1987–88	Mátra	Hatvan KVSC	Budapesti VSC	Gyöngyösi SE	
36.	1987–88	Tisza	Jászberényi Lehel SE	Debreceni Universitas SE	Debreceni Kinizsi SE	
37.	1988–89	Alföld	Szegedi Dózsa SC	Gyulai SE	Pénzügyőr SE	
37.	1988–89	Bakony	Ajkai Hungalu	Ajkai Bányász	Sabaria SE	
37.	1988–89	Dráva	Paksi SE	Paksi Atomerőmű SE	Bólyi Medosz SE	
37.	1988–89	Duna	Budafoki MTE-Törley	Dömsödi Dózsa TSz SK	Péti MTE	
37.	1988–89	Mátra	Salgótarjáni Síküveggyár	Honvéd Köteles Jenő SE	Salgótarjáni BTC	
37.	1988–89	Tisza	Mezőtúri Honvéd SE	Rakamazi Spartacus SE	Tiszavasvári Lombik SE	
38.	1989–90	Alföld	Kecskeméti TE	Honvéd Bem József SE	Miskei TSZ SK	
38.	1989–90	Bakony	Sabaria SE	Ajkai Bányász SK	Győri Dózsa SE	
38.	1989–90	Dráva	Paksi Atomerőmű SE	Kaposvári Rákóczi FC	Kaposvári Honvéd SE	
38.	1989–90	Duna	BKV Előre SC	Erzsébeti SMTK	Dömsödi SE	
38.	1989–90	Mátra	Hatvani KVSC-Deko	Gödöllői SC	Salgótarjáni Kohász SE	
38.	1989–90	Tisza	Kabai Egyetértés SE	Ózdi Kohász SE	Tiszavasvári Lombik SE	
39.	1990–91	Alföld	Miskei TSZ SK	Kiskőrösi Petőfi LC	Szegedi Dózsa SC	
39.	1990–91	Bakony	Ajkai Bányász SK	Keszthelyi Haladás SC	Betka-MÁV DAC	
39.	1990–91	Dráva	Paksi SE	Kaposvári Rákóczi FC	Pécsi VSK	
39.	1990–91	Duna	Erzsébeti SMTK	Pénzügyőr SE	Esztergomi Vasas SC	
39.	1990–91	Mátra	Bagi SE	Salgótarjáni Kohász SE	Gyöngyösi AK	
39.	1990–91	Tisza	Hajdúnánási Bocskai SE	Mátészalkai MTK	Ózdi Kohász SE	
40.	1991–92	Alföld	Kiskőrösi Petőfi LC	Kecskeméti TE	Hódmezővásárhelyi Metripond SE	
40.	1991–92	Bakony	Ajkai Hungalu SK	Keszthelyi Haladás SC	Győri Dózsa	
40.	1991–92	Dráva	Kaposvári Rákóczi	Pécsi VSK	Bolyi Medosz SE	
40.	1991–92	Duna	Pénzügyőr SE	Érdi VSE	Honvéd Hargita SE	
40.	1991–92	Mátra	Gödöllői SK	Jászberényi SE-Vasas	Gyöngyösi AK	
40.	1991–92	Tisza	Tiszavasvári Lombik SE	Hajdúszoboszlói VSE	Ózdi Kohász SE	
41.	1992–93	Alföld	Tiszakécske LC	Kecskeméti SC	Hódmezővásárhelyi LC	
41.	1992–93	Bakony	Keszthelyi Haladás SE	Linde SE Répcelak	Soproni Távközlési SE	
41.	1992–93	Dráva	Beremendi Építők SK	Komlói Bányász SK	Pécsi VSK	
41.	1992–93	Duna	Százhalombatta FC	Érdi VSE	Dunavarsány KSK	
41.	1992–93	Mátra	Rákospalotai EAC	Gyöngyösi SE	Jászberényi SE	
41.	1992–93	Tisza	Balmazújvárosi SC	Rakamazi Spartacus SE	Kisvárdai SE	
42.	1993–94	Alföld	Hódmezővásárhelyi LC	Kecskeméti SC	Kalocsai FC	
42.	1993–94	Bakony	Soproni Távközlési SE	MOTIM TE	Linde SE Répcelak	
42.	1993–94	Dráva	Pécsi VSK	DD Gáz Pécs	Kaposvári Rákóczi FC	
42.	1993–94	Duna	Tatabányai SC	Érdi VSE	Szigetszentmiklósi TK	
42.	1993–94	Mátra	Salgótarjáni BTC	Jászberényi SE	Szolnoki MÁV MTE	
42.	1993–94	Tisza	Stop-Miskolci VFC	Kisvárdai SE	Szerencs-Balox VSE	
43.	1994–95	Alföld	Kecskeméti TE	Kiskörös FC	Gyula FC	
43.	1994–95	Bakony	Balatonfüredi SC	Csorna-Riegler SE	Püspökmolnári KSK	
43.	1994–95	Dráva	Rákóczi-Kaposcukor FC	DD Gáz SC	Komlói Bányász SK	
43.	1994–95	Duna	Érdi VSE	Pilisvörösvári SC	Pénzügyőr SE	
43.	1994–95	Mátra	FC Eger	Dunakeszi VSE	Rákospalotai EAC	
43.	1994–95	Tisza	FC Sényő	Mátészalkai MTK	Tiszaújvárosi SE	
44.	1995–96	Alföld	Kiskundorozsmai ESK	Kiskunfélegyházi TK	Makói FC	
44.	1995–96	Bakony	Körmendi FC	Csornai SE	Répcelak	
44.	1995–96	Dráva	DD Gáz SC	Pécsi VSK	Beremend	
44.	1995–96	Duna	Gázszer	Elektromos SE	Csákvári TK	
44.	1995–96	Mátra	Szolnoki MÁV FC	Rákospalotai EAC	Jászberényi SE	
44.	1995–96	Tisza	Tiszafüred VSE	FC Tiszaújváros	Nagykálló SE	
45.	1996–97	Alföld	Kiskőrös FC	Kiskunfélegyházai TK	Kalocsai FC	
45.	1996–97	Bakony	Büki TK	MOTIM TE	Hévíz SK	
45.	1996–97	Dráva	Komlói Bányász SK	Györkönyi SE	Dunaszentgyörgy SE	
45.	1996–97	Duna	Dorogi SE	Komáromi FC	Csákvár FC	
45.	1996–97	Mátra	Dunakeszi VSE	Rákospalotai EAC	Füzesabony	
45.	1996–97	Tisza	Tiszaújvárosi SC	Demecseri Kinizsi	Nyírbátori FC	
46.	1997–98	West	Komáromi FC	Lombard FC Tataványa	Beremend	
46.	1997–98	East	Demecseri Kinizsi SE	Soroksári TE	Dunakeszi VSE	
47.	1998–99	West	Százhalombattai FC	BKV Előre SC	Dorogi FC	
47.	1998–99	East	Dunakeszi MÁV	Csepel FC	Nyírbátori FC	
48.	1999–2000	West (Note: Although Dorogi FC finished in the fifth place, they were also promoted to 2000–01 Nemzeti Bajnokság II)	Hévíz SK	Veszprém FC	Marcali VSE	
48.	1999–2000	East (Note: Although Fóti SE finished in the fourth place, they were also promoted to 2000–01 Nemzeti Bajnokság II)	Kiskőrösi FC	Kunszentmártoni TE	FC Eger	
49.	2000–01	West	Büki TK	Pécsi VSK	Mosonmagyaróvári TE	
49.	2000–01	Central	Erzsébeti Spartacus MTK LE	FC Dabas	Balassagyarmati SE	
49.	2000–01	East	Eger FC	Diósgyőri VTK	Orosháza-Csorvás	
50.	2001–02	West	Bodajk SE	Tatai HAC	Petőházi SE	
50.	2001–02	Central	Balassagyarmati SE	Kistarcsai VSC	Soroksár-Csepel	
50.	2001–02	East	Demecser FC	Kazincbarcikai SC	Makó FC	
51.	2002–03	West	Bodajk FC	Szekszárdi UFC	Balatonlelle SE	
51.	2002–03	Central	FC Dabas	Vác VLSE	Szigetszentmiklósi TK	
51.	2002–03	East	Kertvárosi FC	FC Szeged	Kazincbarcikai SC	
52.	2003–04	West	Mosonmagyaróvári TE	Komlói Bányász SK	Paksi SE	
52.	2003–04	East	Makói FC	Orosháza FC	Gyulai TFC	
53.	2004–05	West	Felcsút	Paks SE	Integrál DAC	
53.	2004–05	East	Baktalórántháza VSE	Vecsési FC	Szentes	
54.	2005–06	Alföld	Békéscsaba 1912 Előre SE	Algyő SK	Szolnoki Spartacus SE	
54.	2005–06	Bakony	Elekthermax Vasas SE	Sárvári FC	Csesztreg KSE	
54.	2005–06	Dráva	Szentlőrinci SE	Komlói Bányász SK	Tamási SE	
54.	2005–06	Duna	Budaörsi SC	Százhalombattai LK	Móri SE	
54.	2005–06	Mátra	Jászberényi SE	Magyargéc SE	Tura VSK	
54.	2005–06	Tisza	Tuzsér Erdért SE	Létavértes SC '97	Rakmazi Spartacus SE	
55.	2006–07	Alföld	Ceglédi VSE	Hódmezővásárhelyi FC	Örkény SE	
55.	2006–07	Bakony	FC Ajka	Andráshida SC	Sárvári FC	
55.	2006–07	Dráva	Kozármisleny SE	Komlói Bányász SK	Szentlőrinci SE	
55.	2006–07	Duna	Tököli VSK	Pénzügyőr SE	Százhalombattai LK	
55.	2006–07	Mátra	Erzsébeti Spartacus MTK LE	Putnok VSE	Mezőkövesdi SE	
55.	2006–07	Tisza	Balkányi SE	Nyírmadai ISE	Ibrány VSE	
56.	2007–08	Alföld	Békéscsaba 1912 Előre SE	Bajai LSE	Szigetszentmiklósi TK	
56.	2007–08	Bakony	Zalaegerszegi TE FC II	Győri ETO FC II	Hévíz FC	
56.	2007–08	Dráva	Szentlőrinci SE	Balatonlelle SE	Bogád SE	
56.	2007–08	Duna	Százhalombattai LK	Törökbálinti TC	FC Fehérvár II	
56.	2007–08	Mátra	MTK Budapest FC II	Tura VSK	Putnok VSE	
56.	2007–08	Tisza	Debreceni VSC-DEAC	Várda SE	Nyírmadai ISE	
57.	2008–09	Alföld	Budapest Honvéd FC II	Szolnoki Spartacus SK	Kecskeméti TE II	
57.	2008–09	Bakony	Hévíz FC	Veszprém FC	Lipót SK	
57.	2008–09	Dráva	Szentlőrinci SE	Paksi FC II	Nagykanizsai TE 1866	
57.	2008–09	Duna	Szigetszentmiklósi TK	Velence SE	Soroksár SC	
57.	2008–09	Mátra	Mezőkövesdi-Zsóry SE	Újpest FC II	Tura VSK	
57.	2008–09	Tisza	Hajdúböszörményi TE	Nagyecsed RSE	Nyírmadai ISE	
58.	2009–10	Alföld	Orosháza FC	Szolnoki Spartacus SK	Erzsébeti SMTK LE	
58.	2009–10	Bakony	Veszprém FC	Lipót SK	Soproni VSE-GYSEV	
58.	2009–10	Dráva	Bajai LSE	Nagyatádi FC	Szentlőrinc-PVSK SE	
58.	2009–10	Duna	Újpest FC II	Dunaharszti MTK	Érdi VSE	
58.	2009–10	Mátra	Ferencvárosi TC II	Maglódi TC	Putnok VSE	
58.	2009–10	Tisza	Kemecse SE	Tiszakanyár SE	Létavértes SC '97	
59.	2010–11	Alföld	Tököl VSK	KITE Szeged	Újbuda TC	
59.	2010–11	Bakony	Soproni VSE	Lombard Pápa TFC II	Hévíz FC	
59.	2010–11	Dráva	Paksi FC II	Szentlőrinc SE	Kaposvári Rákóczi FC II	
59.	2010–11	Duna	Dunaújváros PASE	Maglódi TC	Dunaharszti MTK	
59.	2010–11	Mátra	Egri FC	Balmazújvárosi FC	Vasas SC II	
59.	2010–11	Tisza	Nagyecsed Rákóczi SE	Cigánd SE	Tiszakanyár SE	
60.	2011–12	Alföld	Dunaharaszti MTK	FC Dabas	Várfürdő-Gyulai Termál FC	
60.	2011–12	Bakony	Aqvital-Publo Csákvári TK	Szombathelyi Haladás II	Csornai SE	
60.	2011–12	Dráva	Kaposvári Rákóczi FC II	Pécsi MFC II	Nagyatádi FC	
60.	2011–12	Duna	Érdi VSE	Dorogi FC	Erzsébeti Spartacus MTK LE	
60.	2011–12	Mátra	Putnok VSE	Maglódi TC	Vasas SC II	
60.	2011–12	Tisza	Várda SE	Nyírbátori FC	Cigánd SE	
61.	2012–13	Alföld	Soroksár SC	Monori SE	Várfürdő-Gyulai Termál FC	
61.	2012–13	Bakony	Dorogi FC	Andráshida SC	Mosonmagyaróvári TE	
61.	2012–13	Dráva	Dunaújváros PASE	UFC Szekszárd	Nagyatádi FC	
61.	2012–13	Duna	Budaörsi SC	Erzsébeti Spartacus MTK LE	Diósdi TC	
61.	2012–13	Mátra	Felsőtárkány	FC Hatvan	Rákospalotai EAC	
61.	2012–13	Tisza	Várda	Nyírbátori FC	FC Tiszaújváros	
62.	2013–14	West	Aqvital-Publo Csákvári TK	Budaörsi SC	BKV Előre	
62.	2013–14	Centre	Soroksár SC	Szeged 2011-Grosics Akadémia	Budapest Honvéd FC II	
62.	2013–14	East	Létavértes SC '97	Kazincbarcikai SC	Debreceni VSC-DEAC	
63.	2014–15	West	Budaörsi SC	Győri ETO FC II	Diósdi TC	
63.	2014–15	Centre	Vác FC	Kozármisleny FC	Rákospalotai EAC	
63.	2014–15	East	Kisvárda FC	Putnok FC	FC Hatvan	
64.	2015–16 (Note: In the 2015-16 Nemzeti Bajnokság III season Ferencvárosi TC II won the championship (West). However, they were not promoted, instead Mosonmagyaróvár and Dorog were promoted. SZEOL SC (Centre) were also promoted along with the champions Kozármisleny. Cegléd and Cigánd were also promoted from the East group along with the champions Nyíregyháza.)	West	Ferencvárosi TC II	Mosonmagyaróvári TE	Dorogi FC	
64.	2015–16	Centre	Kozármisleny FC	Szegedi EOL SC	FC Dabas	
64.	2015–16	East	Nyíregyháza Spartacus FC	Ceglédi VSE	Cigánd SE	
65.	2016–17	West	ETO FC Győr	Érdi VSE	Kaposvári Rákóczi FC	
65.	2016–17	Centre	Budafoki MTE	Pécsi MFC	Szigetszentmiklósi TK	
65.	2016–17	East	Kazincbarcikai SC	Monori SE	Jászberényi FC	
66.	2017–18	West	Kaposvári Rákóczi FC	FC Ajka	Érdi VSE	
66.	2017–18	Centre	Tiszakécskei VSE	Pécsi MFC	Iváncsa KSE	
66.	2017–18	East	Monori SE	Erzsébeti Spartacus MTK LE	Putnok FC	
67.	2018–19	West	FC Ajka	Érdi VSE	Puskás Akadémia FC II	
67.	2018–19	Centre	Szeged-Grosics Akadémia	Szentlőrinci SE	Szegedi EOL SC	
67.	2018–19	East	Szolnoki MÁV FC	Jászberényi FC	Erzsébeti Spartacus MTK LE	
68.	2019–20 (Note: The champiosnhip was abandoned due to the COVID-19 pandemic)	West	Érdi VSE (Note: Although Érdi VSE finished first, they did not have the financial background to participate in the 2020-21 Nemzeti Bajnokság II season. Therefore, Szentlőrinci SE from the centre group were promoted.)	III. Kerületi TVE	Lipót SE	
68.	2019–20	Centre	Pécsi MFC	Szentlőrinci SE	Monori SE	
68.	2019–20	East	Debreceni EAC	Füzesgyarmati SK	Ceglédi VSE	
69.	2020–21	West	III. Kerületi TVE	Mosonmagyaróvári TE	VLS Veszprém	
69.	2020–21	Centre	KSE Iváncsa (Note: Although Iváncsa KSE won the 2020-21 season, Kecskeméti TE were promoted.)	Kecskeméti TE	FC Dabas	
69.	2020–21	East	Tiszakécskei LC	Budapesti VSC-Zugló	Jászberényi FC	
70.	2021–22	West	Mosonmagyaróvári TE	Budapesti VSC-Zugló	VLS Veszprém	
70.	2021–22	Centre	Kozármisleny FC	Balassagyarmati VSE	Dunaujvaros PASE	
70.	2021–22	East	Kazincbarcikai SC	Debreceni EAC	BKV Előre SC	
71.	2022–23	West	VLS Veszprém	Tatabányai SC	Nagykanizsa FC	
71.	2022–23	Centre	KSE Iváncsa	Hódmezővásárhelyi FC	Erzsébeti Spartacus MTK LE	
71.	2022–23	East	Budapesti VSC-Zugló	Putnok FC	Debreceni EAC	
72.	2023–24	Northwest	Tatabányai SC	Bicskei TC	Veszprémi SC	
72.	2023–24	Southwest	Szentlőrinc SE	KSE Iváncsa	Nagykanizsa FC	
72.	2023–24	Northeast	Putnok FC	Cigánd SE	Kisvárda FC II	
72.	2023–24	Southeast	Békéscsaba 1912 Előre	Erzsébeti Spartacus MTK LE	Hódmezővásárhelyi FC	
73.	2024–25	Northwest	Mosonmagyaróvári TE	Bicskei TC	VSC Veszprém	
73.	2024–25	Southwest	FC Nagykanizsa	KSE Iváncsa	Ferencvárosi TC II	
73.	2024–25	Northeast	Karcagi SE	Debreceni EAC	Putnok FC	
73.	2024–25	Southeast	Tiszakécskei LC	Gyulai Termál FC	Monori SE	6

== Name changes ==
- Kaposvári Rákóczi FC - Kapocvári Kinizsi
- Szentendrei Honvéd - Honvéd Kossuth Lajos Főiskolai SE
- Miskolci Bányász - Perecesi TK
- Debreceni MTE - MGM Debrecen, Debreceni Gördülőcsapágygyár
- Gyulai Termál FC - Gyulai MEDOSZ
- Traktorgyári SE - RÁBA KÖG SK
- Szegedi Építők SK - DÉLÉP SC

== See also ==
- List of Hungarian football champions
- List of winners of Nemzeti Bajnokság II
