= 1950 Nemzeti Bajnokság III =

Nemzeti Bajnokság III
- Season: 1950
- Champions: Magyar Textil SE (Bíró); Debreceni Honvéd (Debrecen-Nyíregyháza); Győri SzMTE (Győr-Szombathely); ÉDOSz Húsos (Lénárt); Miskolci Honvéd SE (Miskolc-Salgótarján); Pécsbányatelepi Tárna (Pécs-Kaposvár); Székesfehérvári Lokomotív (Pestvidék-Székesfehérvár); Kiskunfélegyházi SzTK (Szeged-Kiskunhalas); Tótkomlósi DISz MTK (Szolnok-Békéscsaba)
- Promoted: Debreceni Honvéd (Debrecen-Nyíregyháza); Győri SzMTE (Győr-Szombathely); Miskolci Honvéd SE (Miskolc-Salgótarján); Pécsbányatelepi Tárna (Pécs-Kaposvár); Kiskunfélegyházi SzTK (Szeged-Kiskunhalas)

The 1950 Nemzeti Bajnokság III season was the 7th edition of the Nemzeti Bajnokság III. The group winner was unable to secure promotion to NB II in the qualifying round. The National Sports Office, established to oversee physical education and sports, abolished the NB III division by a resolution dated January 3, 1951. With the exception of the teams that earned promotion to NB II through the qualifying tournament, all teams were eligible to compete in the county and Budapest championships to be established the following year. Teams relegated from NB II also competed in these leagues.

== League tables ==
=== Bíró group ===
| Pos | Teams | Pld | W | D | L | GF | GA | GD | Pts | Promotion or relegation |
|---|---|---|---|---|---|---|---|---|---|---|
| 1 | Magyar Textil SE 1 | 15 | 11 | 2 | 2 | 49 | 22 | 27 | 24 | Advance to promotion play-offs |
| 2 | Rákospalotai Növényolaj 2 | 15 | 10 | 4 | 1 | 53 | 27 | 26 | 24 | |
| 3 | Zsolnay MSE (Budapest) 3 | 15 | 9 | 3 | 3 | 31 | 14 | 17 | 21 | |
| 4 | Standard SE 4 | 15 | 9 | 2 | 4 | 37 | 20 | 17 | 20 | |
| 5 | Vasas Ganzhajó 5 | 15 | 9 | 2 | 4 | 46 | 31 | 15 | 20 | |
| 6 | Hofherr-gyári SC 6 | 15 | 8 | 1 | 6 | 42 | 34 | 8 | 17 | |
| 7 | Láng-gépgyár SK 7 | 15 | 7 | 3 | 5 | 33 | 29 | 4 | 17 | |
| 8 | Fésűsfonó 8 | 15 | 5 | 6 | 4 | 34 | 34 | 0 | 16 | |
| 9 | Budakalászi Textilgyári SE 9 | 15 | 6 | 2 | 7 | 19 | 26 | -7 | 14 | |
| 10 | Hungária Jacquard 10 | 15 | 4 | 4 | 7 | 27 | 28 | -1 | 12 | |
| 11 | Szabadkikötő SE | 15 | 4 | 3 | 8 | 24 | 24 | 0 | 11 | |
| 12 | Budapest SE 11 | 15 | 3 | 4 | 8 | 27 | 35 | -8 | 10 | |
| 13 | Egyenruházati NV SE 12 | 15 | 3 | 4 | 8 | 25 | 48 | -23 | 10 | |
| 14 | OKISz 13 | 15 | 4 | 2 | 9 | 17 | 34 | -17 | 10 | |
| 15 | Lampart MSK 14 | 15 | 3 | 3 | 9 | 15 | 41 | -26 | 9 | |
| 16 | Rákospalotai VSK 15 | 15 | 1 | 3 | 11 | 14 | 46 | -32 | 5 | |

Notes:

1. New name: Kőbányai Vörös Lobogó
2. Formerly Hutter Olaj SC
3. New name: Zsolnay Porcelain Factory
4. Following a bilateral agreement, the team played at the home stadium of Kelenvölgyi PaSeNV BLC; new name: Vasas Standard
5. Formerly Ganzhajó
6. New name: Vörös Csillag Tractor Factory
7. New name: Vasas Láng Machine Factory
8. New name: Hazai Combing Mill
9. New name: Budakalászi Vörös Lobogó
10. New name: Vörös Lobogó Jacquard
11. New name: Petőfi City Council SK
12. New name: Vörös Meteor Füszért
13. Formerly EKISz; after July 25, 1950, OKISz; assigned to NB III as the top body of cooperative sports
14. New name: Vasas Lampart
15. New name: Rákospalotai Lokomotív

=== Debrecen-Nyíregyháza group ===
| Pos | Teams | Pld | W | D | L | GF | GA | GD | Pts | Promotion or relegation |
|---|---|---|---|---|---|---|---|---|---|---|
| 1 | Debreceni Honvéd | 15 | 14 | 0 | 1 | 69 | 14 | 55 | 28 | Advance to promotion play-offs |
| 2 | Berettyóújfalui Határőr 1 | 15 | 9 | 5 | 1 | 37 | 14 | 23 | 23 | |
| 3 | Nagykállói SzDSE 2 | 15 | 9 | 4 | 2 | 29 | 17 | 12 | 22 | |
| 4 | Nyírmadai ÁGDSE 3 | 15 | 9 | 1 | 5 | 40 | 25 | 15 | 19 | |
| 5 | Mátészalkai DTK 4 | 15 | 8 | 2 | 5 | 45 | 21 | 24 | 18 | |
| 6 | Balkányi ÁGDSE 5 | 15 | 6 | 3 | 6 | 32 | 29 | 3 | 15 | |
| 7 | Demecseri Lombik 6 | 15 | 6 | 3 | 6 | 32 | 35 | -3 | 15 | |
| 8 | Debreceni ÉDOSz 7 | 15 | 7 | 1 | 7 | 34 | 43 | -9 | 15 | |
| 9 | Kisvárdai Vasas | 15 | 7 | 1 | 7 | 33 | 45 | -12 | 15 | |
| 10 | Biharnagybajomi MASzOLAJ 8 | 15 | 6 | 2 | 7 | 30 | 33 | -3 | 14 | |
| 11 | Nyírbátori ÉDOSz 9 | 15 | 5 | 2 | 8 | 24 | 29 | -5 | 12 | |
| 12 | Fehérgyarmati ÁGSE 10 | 15 | 5 | 2 | 8 | 24 | 45 | -21 | 12 | |
| 13 | Debreceni Postás SE 11 | 15 | 3 | 5 | 7 | 27 | 38 | -11 | 11 | |
| 14 | Tiszamenti Vízműépítő (Tiszalök) 12 | 15 | 3 | 3 | 9 | 22 | 35 | -13 | 9 | |
| 15 | Debreceni Előre 13 | 15 | 4 | 1 | 10 | 24 | 41 | -17 | 9 | |
| 16 | Hajdúnánási ÉDOSz 14 | 15 | 1 | 1 | 13 | 11 | 49 | -38 | 3 | |
| 17 | Mándoki DISz 15 | 0 | 0 | 0 | 0 | 0 | 0 | 0 | 0 | |

Notes

1. 1) Its new name is Berettyóújfalusi Vörös Meteor; it has been relegated to the Hajdú-Bihar County Championship
2. 2) Formerly Nagykállói DSE, its new name is Nagykállói Kinizsi; it has been relegated to the Szabolcs-Szatmár County Championship
3. 3) Its new name is Nyírmadai ÁGSK, and it has been placed in the Szabolcs-Szatmár County Championship
4. 4) Its new name is Mátészalkai Építők, and it has been placed in the Szabolcs-Szatmár County Championship
5. 5) Its new name is Balkányi ÁGSK, and it has been placed in the Szabolcs-Szatmár County Championship
6. 6) Formerly Demecseri Ipartelepek SzSE; new name: Demecseri Szikra; has been relegated to the Szabolcs-Szatmár County Championship
7. 7) Formerly Debreceni Lendület SE; new name: Debreceni Kinizsi; has been relegated to the Hajdú-Bihar County Championship
8. 8) New name: Biharnagybajomi Szikra; moved to the Hajdú-Bihar County Championship
9. 9) Formerly Nyírbátori SzIT SE, now Nyírbátori Kinizsi; moved to the Szabolcs-Szatmár County Championship
10. 10) Until the 5th round, it was Fehérgyarmati SzDSE; it has been moved to the Szabolcs-Szatmár County Championship; its new name is Fehérgyarmati ÁGSK
11. 11) has been relegated to the Hajdú-Bihar County Championship
12. 12) formerly Tiszalöki ÖMTE, now renamed Tiszalöki Vasas, has been relegated to the Szabolcs-Szatmár County Championship
13. 13) has been relegated to the Hajdú-Bihar County Championship
14. 14) Its new name is Hajdúnánási Kinizsi; it was placed in the Hajdú-Bihar County Championship
15. 15) Formerly Mándoki EPOSz; it withdrew on September 26, 1950, and was placed in the Kisvárda District Championship of Szabolcs-Szatmár County

=== Győr-Szombathely group ===
| Pos | Teams | Pld | W | D | L | GF | GA | GD | Pts | Promotion or relegation |
|---|---|---|---|---|---|---|---|---|---|---|
| 1 | Győri SzMTE 1 | 16 | 11 | 5 | 0 | 35 | 8 | 27 | 27 | Advance to promotion play-offs |
| 2 | Kőszegi Nemez Posztó SE 2 | 16 | 10 | 2 | 4 | 30 | 15 | 15 | 22 | |
| 3 | Soproni Sotex SE 3 | 16 | 10 | 1 | 5 | 43 | 24 | 19 | 21 | |
| 4 | Zalaegerszegi MTE 4 | 16 | 9 | 2 | 5 | 38 | 22 | 16 | 20 | |
| 5 | Soproni DSE 5 | 16 | 9 | 2 | 5 | 29 | 19 | 10 | 20 | |
| 6 | Győri Vörös Fonál 6 | 16 | 8 | 4 | 4 | 28 | 24 | 4 | 20 | |
| 7 | Pápai SzMTE 7 | 16 | 7 | 4 | 5 | 28 | 24 | 4 | 18 | |
| 8 | Szombathelyi Postás | 16 | 7 | 3 | 6 | 34 | 28 | 6 | 17 | |
| 9 | Mosoni Vasas Kühne 8 | 16 | 6 | 5 | 5 | 25 | 25 | 0 | 17 | |
| 10 | Vasas Hubertus 9 | 16 | 6 | 3 | 7 | 30 | 27 | 3 | 15 | |
| 11 | Veszprémi Fémmunkások SE 10 | 16 | 5 | 5 | 6 | 30 | 33 | -3 | 15 | |
| 12 | Kapuvári SzSE 11 | 16 | 6 | 2 | 8 | 20 | 23 | -3 | 14 | |
| 13 | Mosonmagyaróvári SzMTE 12 | 16 | 5 | 2 | 9 | 29 | 40 | -11 | 12 | |
| 14 | Celldömölki VSK 13 | 16 | 4 | 4 | 8 | 17 | 28 | -11 | 12 | |
| 15 | Sárvári ÉDOSz 14 | 16 | 5 | 1 | 10 | 18 | 43 | -25 | 11 | |
| 16 | Ajkai DSE 15 | 16 | 3 | 1 | 12 | 17 | 32 | -15 | 7 | |
| 17 | Bánhidai Erőmű 16 | 16 | 2 | 0 | 14 | 13 | 49 | -36 | 4 | |

Notes:

1. 1) February 15, 1951: Győri Vörös Meteor was formed through the merger of Győri SzMTE and Győri Meteor
2. 2) Its new name was Kőszegi Vörös Lobogó, and it joined the Vas County Championship
3. 3) Its new name was Soproni VL Sotex, and it joined the Győr-Sopron County Championship
4. 4) It was renamed Zalaegerszegi Vörös Meteor and joined the Zala County Championship.
5. 5) Formerly Soproni SzFAC; on August 9, 1950, it merged with Soproni Selyemipar to form Soproni DSE; it was renamed Soproni VL Selyemipar and joined the Győr-Sopron County Championship.
6. 6) New name: Győri Vörös Lobogó; moved to the Győr-Sopron County Championship
7. 7) New name: Pápai Petőfi; moved to the Győr-Sopron County Championship
8. 8) Formerly Mosoni Kühne SE; moved to the Veszprém County Championship
9. 9) Formerly Mosonmagyaróvári Hubertus SE; moved to the Győr-Sopron County Championship
10. 10) On October 29, 1950, Veszprémi Dolgozók SE was renamed Veszprémi Fémmunkások SE and moved to the Veszprém County Championship
11. 11) Renamed Kapuvár ÁMGSK; moved to the Győr-Sopron County Championship
12. 12) Formerly Mosonmagyaróvár IMTE; renamed Mosonmagyaróvár Timföld Vasas; moved to the Győr-Sopron County Championship
13. 13) Renamed Celldömölk Lokomotív; moved to the Vas County Championship
14. 14) New name: Sárvári Kinizsi; moved to the Vas County Championship
15. 15) Merged with Ajkai Vasas in early 1951; moved to the Veszprém County Championship
16. 16) New name: Tatabányai Vasas; moved to the Tatabánya group of the Komárom County Championship

=== Lénárt group ===
| Pos | Teams | Pld | W | D | L | GF | GA | GD | Pts | Promotion or relegation |
|---|---|---|---|---|---|---|---|---|---|---|
| 1 | ÉDOSz Húsos 1 | 15 | 10 | 4 | 1 | 39 | 17 | 22 | 24 | Advance to promotion play-offs |
| 2 | Autótaxi MSC 2 | 15 | 11 | 1 | 3 | 52 | 19 | 33 | 23 | |
| 3 | Hungária SC 3 | 15 | 8 | 4 | 3 | 47 | 28 | 19 | 20 | |
| 4 | Pénzügyőri SE 4 | 15 | 8 | 3 | 4 | 35 | 22 | 13 | 19 | |
| 5 | Meteor SzTK 5 | 15 | 8 | 3 | 4 | 36 | 29 | 7 | 19 | |
| 6 | Vasas Ganzvillany 6 | 15 | 7 | 5 | 3 | 36 | 33 | 3 | 19 | |
| 7 | Emergé SC | 15 | 4 | 8 | 3 | 41 | 29 | 12 | 16 | |
| 8 | Vecsési SzMTK 7 | 15 | 8 | 0 | 7 | 30 | 26 | 4 | 16 | |
| 9 | Vasas Generátor 8 | 15 | 7 | 2 | 6 | 35 | 35 | 0 | 16 | |
| 10 | Meteor Nemzeti Bank 9 | 15 | 5 | 3 | 7 | 27 | 35 | -8 | 13 | |
| 11 | Törekvés SE 10 | 15 | 5 | 2 | 8 | 17 | 27 | -10 | 12 | |
| 12 | Budapest-Rákosfalvi Lombik 11 | 15 | 4 | 3 | 8 | 27 | 39 | -12 | 11 | |
| 13 | Nagytétényi Lombik 12 | 15 | 5 | 1 | 9 | 25 | 41 | -16 | 11 | |
| 14 | Tipográfia Állami Nyomda 13 | 15 | 3 | 3 | 9 | 20 | 31 | -11 | 9 | |
| 15 | Szentlőrinci Téglagyári FC | 15 | 1 | 5 | 9 | 21 | 37 | -16 | 7 | |
| 16 | Budapesti DISz FSE 14 | 15 | 2 | 1 | 12 | 27 | 67 | -40 | 5 | |

Notes:

1. 1) New name: Kinizsi Húsos
2. 2) New name: Előre Autótaxi
3. 3) New name: Szikra Hungária
4. 4) formerly Pénzügyi DSE
5. 5) formerly Meteor OTI
6. 6) formerly
7. 7) new name: Vecsési Lokomotív; moved to the Southern Group of the Pest County Championship
8. 8) formerly Generátor SE
9. 9) merged with NB II club Vörös Meteor to form VM Nemzeti Bank
10. 10) new name: Kőbányai Lokomotív
11. 11) formerly Budapest-Rákosfalvai MTE, now known as Bp-Rákosfalvi Szikra
12. 12) formerly Nagytétényi TE, now known as Nagytétényi Szikra
13. 13) formerly Typográfia NyTE, now known as Állami Nyomda
14. 14) formerly Bp. MEFESz, now known as Bp. Haladás

=== Miskolc-Salgótarján group ===
| Pos | Teams | Pld | W | D | L | GF | GA | GD | Pts | Promotion or relegation |
|---|---|---|---|---|---|---|---|---|---|---|
| 1 | Miskolci Honvéd 1 | 15 | 13 | 0 | 2 | 67 | 12 | 55 | 26 | Advance to promotion play-offs |
| 2 | Borsodnádasdi Vasas 2 | 15 | 11 | 1 | 3 | 64 | 20 | 44 | 23 | |
| 3 | Gyöngyösi SzSE 3 | 15 | 9 | 4 | 2 | 34 | 18 | 16 | 22 | |
| 4 | Szerencsi ÉDOSz 4 | 15 | 9 | 2 | 4 | 29 | 29 | 0 | 20 | |
| 5 | Putnoki Tárna 5 | 15 | 7 | 2 | 6 | 32 | 26 | 6 | 16 | |
| 6 | Miskolci Erdész SE 6 | 15 | 7 | 1 | 7 | 33 | 23 | 10 | 15 | |
| 7 | Mátravidéki Erőművek Lőrinci SE 7 | 15 | 6 | 3 | 6 | 33 | 32 | 1 | 15 | |
| 8 | Balassagyarmati SzSE 8 | 15 | 6 | 3 | 6 | 31 | 35 | -4 | 15 | |
| 9 | Zagyvapálfalvai Építők 9 | 15 | 7 | 0 | 8 | 31 | 40 | -9 | 14 | |
| 10 | Bánszállási Tárna 10 | 15 | 7 | 0 | 8 | 18 | 28 | -10 | 14 | |
| 11 | Mezőkövesdi SzTK 11 | 15 | 7 | 0 | 8 | 32 | 53 | -21 | 14 | |
| 12 | Petőfibányai Tárna 12 | 15 | 5 | 2 | 8 | 30 | 64 | -34 | 12 | |
| 13 | Kisterenyei Tárna 13 | 15 | 4 | 3 | 8 | 17 | 36 | -19 | 11 | |
| 14 | Nagybátonyi Tárna 14 | 15 | 3 | 4 | 8 | 26 | 44 | -18 | 10 | |
| 15 | Selypi ÉDOSZ 15 | 15 | 4 | 0 | 11 | 16 | 33 | -17 | 8 | |
| 16 | Salgóbányai Tárna 16 | 15 | 2 | 1 | 12 | 12 | 42 | -30 | 5 | |

Notes:

1. 1) The team, founded on June 8, 1950, was directly assigned by the Hungarian Football Association (MLSz) to NB III
2. 2) Formerly known as Borsodnádasdi Lemezgyári Vasas, it was placed in the Puskin Group of the Borsod-Abaúj-Zemplén County Championship
3. 3) Its new name is Gyöngyösi Építők, and it was placed in the Heves County Championship
4. 4) Its new name is Szerencsi Kinizsi, and it was placed in the Gorkij Group of the Borsod-Abaúj-Zemplén County Championship
5. 5) New name: Putnoki Bányász; placed in the Pushkin Group of the Borsod-Abaúj-Zemplén County Championship
6. 6) Formerly Diósgyőri Lombik; new name: Miskolci Erdészeti SK; placed in the Gorky Group of the Borsod-Abaúj-Zemplén County Championship
7. 7) Its new name is Lőrinci Vasas; it has been placed in the Heves County Championship
8. 8) Its new name is Balassagyarmati Lokomotív; it has been placed in the Nógrád County Championship
9. 9) Formerly Zagyvapálfalvi MÉMOSz; it has been placed in the Nógrád County Championship
10. 10) New name: Bánszállási Bányász; placed in the Pushkin Group of the Borsod-Abaúj-Zemplén County Championship
11. 11) New name: Mezőkövesdi Petőfi; placed in the Gorky Group of the Borsod-Abaúj-Zemplén County Championship
12. 12) Formerly Pernyebányai Tárna, which absorbed Rózsaszentmártoni BSE and adopted the town’s new name
13. 13) New name: Kisterenyei Bányász; moved to the Nógrád County League
14. 14) New name: Nagybátonyi Bányász; moved to the Nógrád County League
15. 15) Its new name is Selypi Kinizsi, and it joined the Heves County League
16. 16) Its new name is Salgóbányai Bányász, and it joined the Nógrád County League

=== Pécs-Kaposvár group ===
| Pos | Teams | Pld | W | D | L | GF | GA | GD | Pts | Promotion or relegation |
|---|---|---|---|---|---|---|---|---|---|---|
| 1 | Pécsbányatelepi Tárna 1 | 14 | 10 | 2 | 2 | 45 | 12 | 33 | 22 | Advance to promotion play-offs |
| 2 | Dombóvári VSK 2 | 14 | 10 | 1 | 3 | 35 | 20 | 15 | 21 | |
| 3 | Szászvári Tárna 3 | 14 | 9 | 2 | 3 | 40 | 18 | 22 | 20 | |
| 4 | Nagykanizsai Építők 4 | 14 | 8 | 3 | 3 | 30 | 21 | 9 | 19 | |
| 5 | Nagymányoki Tárna 5 | 14 | 8 | 2 | 4 | 42 | 21 | 21 | 18 | |
| 6 | Barcsi SzMTE 6 | 14 | 5 | 5 | 4 | 31 | 18 | 13 | 15 | |
| 7 | Mecsekszabolcsi Tárna 7 | 14 | 5 | 3 | 6 | 30 | 16 | 14 | 13 | |
| 8 | Nagyatádi MTE 8 | 14 | 6 | 1 | 7 | 20 | 32 | -12 | 13 | |
| 9 | Pécsi Postás | 14 | 5 | 2 | 7 | 32 | 38 | -6 | 12 | |
| 10 | Pécsi Dózsa 9 | 14 | 4 | 3 | 7 | 19 | 28 | -9 | 11 | |
| 11 | Szigetvári Zrinyi Miklós AK 10 | 14 | 4 | 3 | 7 | 18 | 34 | -16 | 11 | |
| 12 | Simontornyai BTC 11 | 14 | 3 | 4 | 7 | 19 | 19 | 0 | 10 | |
| 13 | Marcali DSK 12 | 14 | 3 | 3 | 8 | 19 | 37 | -18 | 9 | |
| 14 | Bátaszéki VSK 13 | 14 | 3 | 2 | 9 | 18 | 53 | -35 | 8 | |
| 15 | Pécsi Erdőgazdaság NVSE 14 | 14 | 3 | 2 | 9 | 12 | 43 | -31 | 8 | |

Notes

1. 1) Its new name is Pécsbányatelepi Bányász
2. 2) New name: Dombóvári Lokomotív; moved to the Tolna County Championship
3. 3) New name: Szászvári Bányász; moved to the Baranya County Championship
4. 4) Formerly Nagykanizsai MTE; moved to the Zala County Championship
5. 5) New name: Nagymányoki Bányász; moved to the Tolna County Championship
6. 6) Formerly Barcsi SzMSE, now Barcsi Lokomotív, has been placed in the Somogy County Championship
7. 7) Now known as Mecsekszabolcsi Bányász, has been placed in the Baranya County Championship
8. 8) Now known as Nagyatádi Vörös Lobogó, has been placed in the Somogy County Championship
9. 9) Started in place of Pécsi KaSE; moved to the Baranya County Championship
10. 10) New name: Szigetvári Vörös Lobogó; moved to the Baranya County Championship
11. 11) New name: Simontornyai Vörös Lobogó; moved to the Tolna County Championship
12. 12) Its new name is Marcali Petőfi; it has been placed in the Somogy County Championship
13. 13) Its new name is Bátaszéki Lokomotív; it has been placed in the Tolna County Championship
14. 14) Its new name is Pécsi Erdőgazdasági SK; it has been placed in the Baranya County Championship

=== Pestvidék-Székesfehérvár group ===
| Pos | Teams | Pld | W | D | L | GF | GA | GD | Pts | Promotion or relegation |
|---|---|---|---|---|---|---|---|---|---|---|
| 1 | Székesfehérvári Lokomotív 1 | 15 | 12 | 1 | 2 | 57 | 17 | 40 | 25 | Advance to promotion play-offs |
| 2 | Siófoki Építők 2 | 15 | 12 | 1 | 2 | 47 | 20 | 27 | 25 | |
| 3 | Várpalotai Tárna 3 | 15 | 11 | 1 | 3 | 46 | 19 | 27 | 23 | |
| 4 | Péti Lombik 4 | 15 | 10 | 2 | 3 | 43 | 21 | 22 | 22 | |
| 5 | Rákosmenti Lombik 5 | 15 | 9 | 1 | 5 | 42 | 32 | 10 | 19 | |
| 6 | Balatonfüredi Vasas HSK 6 | 15 | 7 | 3 | 5 | 37 | 39 | -2 | 17 | |
| 7 | Pilisi Tárna (Pilisvörösvár) 7 | 15 | 7 | 2 | 6 | 34 | 24 | 10 | 16 | |
| 8 | Kisgyóni Tárna 8 | 15 | 8 | 0 | 7 | 37 | 33 | 4 | 16 | |
| 9 | Esztergomi DSE 9 | 15 | 6 | 2 | 7 | 23 | 29 | -6 | 14 | |
| 10 | Komáromi DSK 10 | 15 | 6 | 2 | 7 | 25 | 34 | -9 | 14 | |
| 11 | Rákoscsabai Postás 11 | 15 | 5 | 2 | 8 | 26 | 36 | -10 | 12 | |
| 12 | Tokodi ÜMSE 12 | 15 | 5 | 1 | 9 | 30 | 30 | 0 | 11 | |
| 13 | Albertirsai DISz 13 | 15 | 3 | 4 | 8 | 27 | 46 | -19 | 10 | |
| 14 | Monori SzSE 14 | 15 | 4 | 1 | 10 | 29 | 50 | -21 | 9 | |
| 15 | Gödöllői SzTK 15 | 15 | 0 | 4 | 11 | 16 | 36 | -20 | 4 | |
| 16 | Péceli SzSE 16 | 15 | 1 | 1 | 13 | 24 | 77 | -53 | 3 | |

Notes:

1. 1) was promoted to the Fejér County Championship
2. 2) formerly Siófoki DSE, was promoted to the Somogy County Championship
3. 3) renamed Várpalotai Bányász, was promoted to the Veszprém County Championship
4. 4) renamed Péti Szikra, was promoted to the Veszprém County Championship
5. 5) New name: Rákosmenti Szikra; moved to Division I of the Budapest Championship
6. 6) New name: Balatonfüredi Vasas; moved to the Veszprém County Championship
7. 7) New name: Pilisi Bányász; moved to the Northern Group of the Pest County Championship
8. 8) New name: Kisgyóni Bányász; moved to the Fejér County Championship
9. 9) Formerly Esztergomi SzDSE; new name: Esztergomi Vasas; moved to the Tokod Group of the Komárom County Championship
10. 10) New name: Komáromi Lokomotív; moved to the Tatabánya Group of the Komárom County Championship
11. 11) has been placed in Division I of the Budapest Championship
12. 12) has been renamed Tokodi Üveggyári Építők and has been placed in the Tokod group of the Komárom County Championship
13. 13) formerly Alberti-Irsai DSE, now named Albertirsai Lokomotív, has been placed in the Southern group of the Pest County Championship
14. 14) Its new name is Monori Építők; it was placed in the Southern Group of the Pest County Championship
15. 15) Its new name is Gödöllői Petőfi; it was placed in the Northern Group of the Pest County Championship
16. 16) Its new name is Péceli Postás; it was placed in the Northern Group of the Pest County Championship

Tokod canceled the Tokodi ÜMSE vs. Péti Lombik match; Pét was awarded the 2 points with a 0-0 result.

=== Szeged-Kiskunhalas group ===
| Pos | Teams | Pld | W | D | L | GF | GA | GD | Pts | Promotion or relegation |
|---|---|---|---|---|---|---|---|---|---|---|
| 1 | Kiskunfélegyházi SzTK 1 | 15 | 12 | 3 | 0 | 48 | 15 | 33 | 27 | Advance to promotion play-offs |
| 2 | Szegedi Dózsa | 15 | 12 | 2 | 1 | 38 | 11 | 27 | 26 | |
| 3 | Makói VSK 2 | 15 | 9 | 2 | 4 | 49 | 11 | 38 | 20 | |
| 4 | Bácsalmási Szakszervezeti SE 3 | 15 | 8 | 3 | 4 | 46 | 27 | 19 | 19 | |
| 5 | Hódmezővásárhelyi SzMTE 4 | 15 | 7 | 4 | 4 | 37 | 19 | 18 | 18 | |
| 6 | Szegedi Postás 5 | 15 | 7 | 2 | 6 | 37 | 29 | 8 | 16 | |
| 7 | Kisteleki SzTE 6 | 15 | 6 | 3 | 6 | 21 | 32 | -11 | 15 | |
| 8 | Csongrádi SzTK 7 | 15 | 5 | 4 | 6 | 23 | 26 | -3 | 14 | |
| 9 | Szegedi ÉDOSz 8 | 15 | 6 | 2 | 7 | 25 | 32 | -7 | 14 | |
| 10 | Bajai SzAK 9 | 15 | 5 | 3 | 7 | 38 | 30 | 8 | 13 | |
| 11 | Dorozsmai KMTE 10 | 15 | 3 | 6 | 6 | 26 | 35 | -9 | 12 | |
| 12 | Kalocsai SzSE 11 | 15 | 4 | 3 | 8 | 24 | 42 | -18 | 11 | |
| 13 | Szentesi SzTE 12 | 15 | 4 | 2 | 9 | 26 | 40 | -14 | 10 | |
| 14 | Kiskőrösi Petőfi 13 | 15 | 3 | 4 | 8 | 23 | 41 | -18 | 10 | |
| 15 | Jánoshalmi SzSE 14 | 15 | 4 | 1 | 10 | 14 | 61 | -47 | 9 | |
| 16 | Szőregi Rákóczi DISz 15 | 15 | 1 | 4 | 10 | 17 | 41 | -24 | 6 | |

Notes:

1. 1) Formerly Kiskunfélegyházi MTK; new name: Kiskunfélegyházi Vasas
2. 2) New name: Makói Lokomotív; moved to the Csongrád County Championship
3. 3) New name: Bácsalmási Petőfi; has moved to the Bács-Kiskun County Championship
4. 4) New name: Hódmezővásárhelyi Dózsa; has moved to the Csongrád County Championship
5. 5) Has moved to the Csongrád County Championship
6. 6) New name: Kisteleki Vörös Meteor; has moved to the Csongrád County Championship
7. 7) New name: Csongrádi Petőfi; moved to the Csongrád County Championship
8. 8) Formerly Móravárosi ÉDOSz; new name: Szegedi Kinizsi; moved to the Csongrád County Championship
9. 9) New name: Bajai Építők; moved to the Bács-Kiskun County Championship
10. 10) New name: Dorozsmai Vörös Lobogó; moved to the Csongrád County Championship
11. 11) New name: Kalocsai Kinizsi; moved to the Bács-Kiskun County Championship
12. 12) New name: Szentesi Kinizsi; moved to the Csongrád County Championship
13. 13) has been relegated to the Bács-Kiskun County League
14. 14) its new name is Jánoshalmi Kinizsi; it has been relegated to the Bács-Kiskun County League
15. 15) formerly Szőregi EPOSz; its new name is Szőregi TSz SK; it has been relegated to the Csongrád County League

=== Szolnok-Békéscsaba group ===
| Pos | Teams | Pld | W | D | L | GF | GA | GD | Pts | Promotion or relegation |
|---|---|---|---|---|---|---|---|---|---|---|
| 1 | Tótkomlósi DISz MTK 1 | 16 | 13 | 0 | 3 | 39 | 17 | 22 | 26 | Advance to promotion play-offs |
| 2 | Orosházi SzMTK 2 | 16 | 12 | 1 | 3 | 60 | 19 | 41 | 25 | |
| 3 | Martfűi BDSE 3 | 16 | 11 | 2 | 3 | 30 | 8 | 22 | 24 | |
| 4 | Mezőtúri SzSE 4 | 16 | 9 | 2 | 5 | 46 | 24 | 22 | 20 | |
| 5 | Sarkadi SzMSE 5 | 16 | 9 | 2 | 5 | 34 | 23 | 11 | 20 | |
| 6 | Mezőberényi DISz 6 | 16 | 9 | 2 | 5 | 30 | 28 | 2 | 20 | |
| 7 | Jászberényi SzSE 7 | 16 | 8 | 1 | 7 | 40 | 28 | 12 | 17 | |
| 8 | Békéscsabai VSK 8 | 16 | 6 | 3 | 7 | 27 | 25 | 2 | 15 | |
| 9 | Szarvasi SzSE 9 | 16 | 6 | 3 | 7 | 36 | 38 | -2 | 15 | |
| 10 | Gyomai DISz 10 | 16 | 6 | 3 | 7 | 16 | 20 | -4 | 15 | |
| 11 | Püspökladányi VSK 11 | 16 | 5 | 4 | 7 | 26 | 31 | -5 | 14 | |
| 12 | Nagykőrösi SzMSE 12 | 16 | 6 | 2 | 8 | 31 | 43 | -12 | 14 | |
| 13 | Törökszentmiklósi SzMTE 13 | 16 | 6 | 1 | 9 | 34 | 38 | -4 | 13 | |
| 14 | Mezőkovácsházi ÉDOSz 14 | 16 | 5 | 1 | 10 | 23 | 33 | -10 | 11 | |
| 15 | Abonyi MTE 15 | 16 | 3 | 4 | 9 | 12 | 46 | -34 | 10 | |
| 16 | Békési SzMSE 16 | 16 | 3 | 1 | 12 | 11 | 48 | -37 | 7 | |
| 17 | Karcagi SzTE 17 | 16 | 2 | 2 | 12 | 15 | 41 | -26 | 6 | |

Notes:

1. 1) Formerly Tótkomlósi SzMTK, then Tótkomlósi ÉDOSz; its new name is Tótkomlósi Építők, and it has been promoted to the Békés County Championship
2. 2) Its new name is Orosházi Kinizsi, and it has been promoted to the Békés County Championship
3. 3) Its new name is Martfúi Vörös Lobogó, and it has been promoted to the Szolnok County Championship
4. 4) New name: Mezőtúri Építők; has been placed in the Szolnok County Championship
5. 5) New name: Sarkadi Kinizsi; has been placed in the Békés County Championship
6. 6) Formerly Mezőberényi EPOSz; new name: Mezőberényi ÁGSK; has been placed in the Békés County Championship
7. 7) New name: Jászberényi Építők; moved to the Szolnok County League
8. 8) New name: Békéscsabai Lokomotív; moved to the Békés County League
9. 9) Formerly, and now once again, Szarvasi Vasas; moved to the Békés County League
10. 10) Formerly Gyomai MTK; new name: Gyomai Kinizsi; moved to the Békés County Championship
11. 11) Its new name is Püspökladányi Lokomotív; it has been relegated to the Hajdú-Bihar County Championship
12. 12) Formerly Nagykőrösi MSE; its new name is Nagykőrösi Kinizsi; it has been relegated to the Southern Group of the Pest County Championship
13. 13) Formerly Törökszentmiklósi MTE, now known as Törökszentmiklósi Vasas, has been placed in the Szolnok County League
14. 14) Formerly Mezőkovácsházi EPOSz TE, now known as Mezőkovácsházi Kinizsi, has been placed in the Békés County League
15. 15) Now known as Abonyi Petőfi, it has been placed in the Southern Division of the Pest County Championship
16. 16) Now known as Békési ??, it has been placed in the Békés County Championship
17. 17) Now known as Karcagi Petőfi, it has been placed in the Szolnok County Championship

== Promotion play-offs ==
=== Group 1 ===
| | | Pld | W | D | L | GF | GA | Pts | Promotion |
|---|---|---|---|---|---|---|---|---|---|
| 1 | Kiskunfélegyházi SzTK | 5 | 3 | 1 | 1 | 8 | 3 | 7 | Promoted to Nemzeti Bajnokság II |
| 2 | Győri SzMTE | 5 | 3 | 1 | 1 | 8 | 6 | 7 | Promoted to Nemzeti Bajnokság II |
| 3 | Autótaxi MSC | 5 | 2 | 2 | 1 | 10 | 8 | 6 | Promoted to Nemzeti Bajnokság II |
| 4 | Tótkomlósi DISz MTK | 5 | 2 | 1 | 2 | 12 | 13 | 5 | |
| 5 | Székesfehérvári Lokomotív | 5 | 1 | 3 | 1 | 7 | 8 | 5 | |
| 6 | Magyar Textil | 5 | 0 | 0 | 5 | 6 | 13 | 0 | |

=== Group 2 ===
| | | Pld | W | D | L | GF | GA | Pts | Promotion |
|---|---|---|---|---|---|---|---|---|---|
| 1 | Miskolci Honvéd SE | 5 | 2 | 3 | 0 | 12 | 7 | 7 | Promoted to Nemzeti Bajnokság II |
| 2 | Pécsbányatelepi Tárna | 5 | 2 | 2 | 1 | 9 | 10 | 6 | Promoted to Nemzeti Bajnokság II |
| 3 | Debreceni Honvéd | 5 | 2 | 1 | 2 | 11 | 7 | 5 | Promoted to Nemzeti Bajnokság II |
| 4 | Siófoki Építők | 5 | 1 | 3 | 1 | 9 | 10 | 5 | |
| 5 | ÉDOSz Húsos | 5 | 1 | 2 | 2 | 5 | 9 | 4 | |
| 6 | Rákospalotai Növényolaj | 5 | 1 | 1 | 3 | 9 | 12 | 3 | |

== See also ==
- 1950 Nemzeti Bajnokság I
- 1950 Nemzeti Bajnokság II
