= 1982–83 Nemzeti Bajnokság III =

Nemzeti Bajnokság III
- Season: 1982–83
- Champions: Bakony Vegyész TC (Bakony); Kaposvári Rákóczi SC (Dráva); Dunaújváros Kohász SE (Duna); Honvéd Szabó Lajos SE (Kőrös); Honvéd Papp József SE (Mátra); Szolnoki MÁV MTE (Tisza)
- Promoted: Bakony Vegyész TC (Bakony); Honvéd Szabó Lajos SE (Kőrös); Szolnoki MÁV MTE (Tisza)

The 1982–83 Nemzeti Bajnokság III season was the 2nd edition of the Nemzeti Bajnokság III.

== League tables ==
=== Bakony group ===
| Pos | Teams | Pld | W | D | L | GF | GA | GD | Pts | Promotion or relegation |
|---|---|---|---|---|---|---|---|---|---|---|
| 1 | Bakony Vegyész TC | 34 | 26 | 6 | 2 | 75 | 25 | 50 | 58 | Advance to play-offs |
| 2 | Honvéd Katona József SE | 34 | 17 | 7 | 10 | 63 | 34 | 29 | 41 | |
| 3 | Répcelaki Bányász SE | 34 | 13 | 14 | 7 | 50 | 44 | 6 | 40 | |
| 4 | Sabaria SE | 34 | 15 | 7 | 12 | 53 | 41 | 12 | 37 | |
| 5 | NIKE Fűzfői AK | 34 | 16 | 5 | 13 | 50 | 49 | 1 | 37 | |
| 6 | Soproni Postás SK | 34 | 14 | 8 | 12 | 49 | 44 | 5 | 36 | |
| 7 | Mosonmagyaróvári TE | 34 | 13 | 9 | 12 | 41 | 30 | 11 | 35 | |
| 8 | Ajkai Alumínium SK | 34 | 13 | 9 | 12 | 47 | 50 | -3 | 35 | |
| 9 | Székesfehérvári MÁV Előre SC | 34 | 14 | 6 | 14 | 45 | 44 | 1 | 34 | |
| 10 | Várpalotai Bányász SK | 34 | 13 | 7 | 14 | 43 | 51 | -8 | 33 | |
| 11 | Győri Dózsa SE | 34 | 13 | 7 | 14 | 51 | 65 | -14 | 33 | |
| 12 | Sárvári Kinizsi | 34 | 11 | 10 | 13 | 48 | 44 | 4 | 32 | |
| 13 | MÁV Dunántúli AC | 34 | 11 | 10 | 13 | 50 | 48 | 2 | 32 | |
| 14 | Zirc-Dudari Bányász | 34 | 14 | 4 | 16 | 47 | 48 | -1 | 32 | |
| 15 | Péti MTE | 34 | 10 | 10 | 14 | 38 | 44 | -6 | 30 | |
| 16 | Győrszentiváni TSZ SK | 34 | 9 | 5 | 20 | 35 | 62 | -27 | 23 | Relegation to Megyei Bajnokság I |
| 17 | Hévízi SK | 34 | 7 | 8 | 19 | 41 | 66 | -25 | 22 | Relegation to Megyei Bajnokság I |
| 18 | Körmendi Dózsa MTE | 34 | 8 | 6 | 20 | 38 | 75 | -37 | 22 | Relegation to Megyei Bajnokság I |

=== Dráva group ===
| Pos | Teams | Pld | W | D | L | GF | GA | GD | Pts | Promotion or relegation |
|---|---|---|---|---|---|---|---|---|---|---|
| 1 | Kaposvári Rákóczi SC | 30 | 18 | 5 | 7 | 64 | 26 | 38 | 41 | Advance to play-offs |
| 2 | Sellyei SK | 30 | 16 | 8 | 6 | 48 | 26 | 22 | 40 | |
| 3 | Siklósi SE | 30 | 15 | 10 | 5 | 35 | 18 | 17 | 40 | |
| 4 | Mohácsi TE | 30 | 16 | 5 | 9 | 41 | 26 | 15 | 37 | |
| 5 | Komlói Bányász SK | 30 | 15 | 4 | 11 | 59 | 36 | 23 | 34 | |
| 6 | Bólyi MEDOSZ | 30 | 13 | 7 | 10 | 53 | 49 | 4 | 33 | |
| 7 | Kisdorogi MEDOSZ | 30 | 15 | 2 | 13 | 47 | 41 | 6 | 32 | |
| 8 | Nagyatádi Városi SE | 30 | 11 | 10 | 9 | 43 | 38 | 5 | 32 | |
| 9 | Honvéd Táncsics SE | 30 | 11 | 8 | 11 | 56 | 51 | 5 | 30 | |
| 10 | Bonyhádi MSC | 30 | 10 | 9 | 11 | 40 | 46 | -6 | 29 | |
| 11 | Pécsi VSK | 30 | 9 | 8 | 13 | 43 | 51 | -8 | 26 | |
| 12 | Pécsi BTC | 30 | 9 | 7 | 14 | 28 | 42 | -14 | 25 | |
| 13 | Mázaszászvári Bányász | 30 | 8 | 8 | 14 | 38 | 46 | -8 | 24 | |
| 14 | Dombóvári MSC | 30 | 9 | 6 | 15 | 34 | 48 | -14 | 24 | Relegation to Megyei Bajnokság I |
| 15 | Paksi SE | 30 | 8 | 4 | 18 | 37 | 70 | -33 | 20 | Relegation to Megyei Bajnokság I |
| 16 | Enyingi MEDOSZ SE | 30 | 3 | 7 | 20 | 31 | 83 | -52 | 13 | Relegation to Megyei Bajnokság I |

=== Duna group ===
| Pos | Teams | Pld | W | D | L | GF | GA | GD | Pts | Promotion or relegation |
|---|---|---|---|---|---|---|---|---|---|---|
| 1 | Dunaújváros Kohász SE | 32 | 23 | 5 | 4 | 80 | 20 | 60 | 51 | Advance to play-offs |
| 2 | Budafoki MTE | 32 | 15 | 12 | 5 | 59 | 39 | 20 | 42 | |
| 3 | Budapesti VSC | 32 | 16 | 9 | 7 | 62 | 51 | 11 | 41 | |
| 4 | Esztergomi MIM Vasas SE | 32 | 13 | 11 | 8 | 50 | 40 | 10 | 37 | |
| 5 | Ráckevei Aranykalász TSz SE | 32 | 13 | 8 | 11 | 52 | 40 | 12 | 34 | |
| 6 | Kossuth KFSE | 32 | 11 | 12 | 9 | 58 | 52 | 6 | 34 | |
| 7 | BKV Előre SC | 32 | 11 | 11 | 10 | 45 | 40 | 5 | 33 | |
| 8 | Érdi VSE | 32 | 13 | 6 | 13 | 57 | 57 | 0 | 32 | |
| 9 | Oroszlányi Bányász SK | 32 | 9 | 13 | 10 | 45 | 47 | -2 | 31 | |
| 10 | Vasas Ikarus SK | 32 | 9 | 11 | 12 | 46 | 40 | 6 | 29 | |
| 11 | Pénzügyőr SE | 32 | 8 | 13 | 11 | 29 | 38 | -9 | 29 | |
| 12 | Bábolnai SE | 32 | 11 | 6 | 15 | 44 | 67 | -23 | 28 | Relegation to Megyei Bajnokság I |
| 13 | Építők SC | 32 | 8 | 10 | 14 | 27 | 38 | -11 | 26 | |
| 14 | Honvéd Rákóczi SE | 32 | 8 | 10 | 14 | 41 | 59 | -18 | 26 | |
| 15 | III. Kerületi TTVE | 32 | 10 | 6 | 16 | 38 | 56 | -18 | 26 | Relegation to Megyei Bajnokság I |
| 16 | Dunakeszi VSE | 32 | 8 | 7 | 17 | 39 | 58 | -19 | 23 | Relegation to Megyei Bajnokság I |
| 17 | ÉGSZÖV-MEDOSZ SE | 32 | 8 | 6 | 18 | 50 | 80 | -30 | 22 | Relegation to Megyei Bajnokság I |
| 18 | Mezőfalvai SE 1 | 0 | 0 | 0 | 0 | 0 | 0 | 0 | 0 | Relegation to Megyei Bajnokság I |

Notes

1. deleted

=== Kőrös group ===
| Pos | Teams | Pld | W | D | L | GF | GA | GD | Pts | Promotion or relegation |
|---|---|---|---|---|---|---|---|---|---|---|
| 1 | Honvéd Szabó Lajos SE | 28 | 16 | 9 | 3 | 64 | 23 | 41 | 41 | Advance to play-offs |
| 2 | Békési SE | 28 | 15 | 9 | 4 | 47 | 22 | 25 | 39 | |
| 3 | Délép SC | 28 | 12 | 13 | 3 | 44 | 29 | 15 | 37 | |
| 4 | Gyulai SE | 28 | 15 | 7 | 6 | 60 | 46 | 14 | 37 | |
| 5 | Kecskeméti TE | 28 | 13 | 10 | 5 | 55 | 41 | 14 | 36 | |
| 6 | Orosházi MTK | 28 | 13 | 9 | 6 | 40 | 27 | 13 | 35 | |
| 7 | Szarvasi Főiskola Spartacus SC | 28 | 12 | 6 | 10 | 56 | 40 | 16 | 30 | |
| 8 | Szegedi VSE | 28 | 8 | 10 | 10 | 34 | 38 | -4 | 26 | |
| 9 | Honvéd Kun Béla SE | 28 | 8 | 9 | 11 | 44 | 45 | -1 | 25 | |
| 10 | Dömsödi Dózsa TSz SE | 28 | 7 | 11 | 10 | 33 | 43 | -10 | 25 | |
| 11 | Szegedi Dózsa | 28 | 8 | 8 | 12 | 55 | 51 | 4 | 24 | |
| 12 | Lajosmizse | 28 | 6 | 9 | 13 | 34 | 39 | -5 | 21 | |
| 13 | Nagyszénási TSz SK | 28 | 5 | 8 | 15 | 30 | 56 | -26 | 18 | |
| 14 | Mindszent | 28 | 6 | 4 | 18 | 27 | 68 | -41 | 16 | Relegation to Megyei Bajnokság I |
| 15 | Füzesgyarmat | 28 | 2 | 6 | 20 | 25 | 80 | -55 | 10 | Relegation to Megyei Bajnokság I |
| 16 | Hódmezővásárhelyi Porcelán SE 1 | 0 | 0 | 0 | 0 | 0 | 0 | 0 | 0 | Relegation to Megyei Bajnokság I |

Notes

1. withdrew

=== Mátra group ===
| Pos | Teams | Pld | W | D | L | GF | GA | GD | Pts | Promotion or relegation |
|---|---|---|---|---|---|---|---|---|---|---|
| 1 | Honvéd Papp József SE | 30 | 19 | 7 | 4 | 70 | 30 | 40 | 45 | Advance to play-offs |
| 2 | Lehel SC | 30 | 18 | 8 | 4 | 80 | 40 | 40 | 44 | |
| 3 | Hatvani KVSC | 30 | 16 | 8 | 6 | 67 | 34 | 33 | 40 | |
| 4 | Váci Izzó MTE | 30 | 16 | 8 | 6 | 54 | 26 | 28 | 40 | |
| 5 | Olefin SC | 30 | 14 | 7 | 9 | 63 | 29 | 34 | 35 | |
| 6 | Gyöngyösi SE | 30 | 13 | 5 | 12 | 51 | 45 | 6 | 31 | |
| 7 | Borsodi Bányász SE | 30 | 13 | 5 | 12 | 49 | 46 | 3 | 31 | |
| 8 | Balassagyarmati SE | 30 | 12 | 6 | 12 | 53 | 48 | 5 | 29 | |
| 9 | Bélapátfalvi Építők | 30 | 12 | 5 | 13 | 39 | 48 | -9 | 29 | |
| 10 | Recski Ércbányász | 30 | 12 | 4 | 14 | 53 | 65 | -12 | 28 | |
| 11 | Edelényi Bányász | 30 | 9 | 8 | 13 | 35 | 50 | -15 | 26 | |
| 12 | Borsodnádasd | 30 | 9 | 8 | 13 | 42 | 62 | -20 | 26 | |
| 13 | Salgótarjáni Síküveggyár | 30 | 7 | 6 | 17 | 48 | 64 | -16 | 20 | |
| 14 | Miskolci VSC | 30 | 7 | 6 | 17 | 22 | 60 | -38 | 20 | Relegation to Megyei Bajnokság I |
| 15 | Borsodi Volán 1 | 30 | 10 | 6 | 14 | 48 | 49 | -1 | 18 | |
| 16 | Pásztó | 30 | 2 | 5 | 23 | 18 | 96 | -78 | 9 | Relegation to Megyei Bajnokság I |

Notes

1. 8 points deducted

=== Tisza group ===
| Pos | Teams | Pld | W | D | L | GF | GA | GD | Pts | Promotion or relegation |
|---|---|---|---|---|---|---|---|---|---|---|
| 1 | Szolnoki MÁV MTE | 30 | 20 | 4 | 6 | 74 | 26 | 48 | 44 | Advance to play-offs |
| 2 | Debreceni Universitas SE | 30 | 17 | 6 | 7 | 56 | 29 | 27 | 40 | |
| 3 | Honvéd Bem József SE | 30 | 17 | 6 | 7 | 60 | 37 | 23 | 40 | |
| 4 | Hajdúböszörményi Bocskai SE | 30 | 14 | 5 | 11 | 49 | 34 | 15 | 33 | |
| 5 | Rakamazi Spartacus SE | 30 | 13 | 5 | 12 | 39 | 31 | 8 | 31 | |
| 6 | Hajdúszoboszlói Bocskai SE | 30 | 12 | 7 | 11 | 46 | 45 | 1 | 31 | |
| 7 | Tiszavasvári Lombik SE | 30 | 10 | 11 | 9 | 42 | 44 | -2 | 31 | |
| 8 | Balmazújvárosi Lenin TSZ SE | 30 | 12 | 7 | 11 | 50 | 68 | -18 | 31 | |
| 9 | Rákóczifalvai TSZ SE | 30 | 10 | 10 | 10 | 47 | 47 | 0 | 30 | |
| 10 | Kisvárdai SE | 30 | 11 | 8 | 11 | 55 | 57 | -2 | 30 | |
| 11 | Mátészalkai MTK | 30 | 12 | 5 | 13 | 51 | 44 | 7 | 29 | |
| 12 | Jászkiséri TSz SE | 30 | 8 | 13 | 9 | 34 | 46 | -12 | 29 | |
| 13 | Püspökladányi MÁV Egyetértés SE | 30 | 11 | 6 | 13 | 34 | 43 | -9 | 28 | |
| 14 | Honvéd Asztalos János SE | 30 | 7 | 9 | 14 | 31 | 50 | -19 | 23 | Relegation to Megyei Bajnokság I |
| 15 | Hajdú Vasas SE | 30 | 6 | 7 | 17 | 33 | 54 | -21 | 19 | Relegation to Megyei Bajnokság I |
| 16 | Csengeri TSz SE | 30 | 2 | 7 | 21 | 23 | 69 | -46 | 11 | Relegation to Megyei Bajnokság I |

== Promotion play-offs ==
Playoff 1
| Home | Result | Away |
|---|---|---|
| Bakony Vegyész TC | 2–0 (0–0) | Dunaújvárosi Kohász SE |
| Dunaújvárosi Kohász SE | 2–0 (0–0) | Bakony Vegyész TC |

Bakony won on penalty shoot-out

Playoff 2
| Home | | Away |
|---|---|---|
| Szolnoki MÁV MTE | 1–1 (1–0) | Kaposvári Rákóczi SC |
| Kaposvári Rákóczi SC | 2–4 (1–3) | Szolnoki MÁV MTE |

Playoff 3
| Home | Result | Away |
|---|---|---|
| Honvéd Szabó Lajos SE | 1–0 (0–0) | Honvéd Papp József SE |
| Honvéd Papp József SE | 1–1 (0–0) | Honvéd Szabó Lajos SE |

== See also ==
- 1982–83 Magyar Kupa
- 1982–83 Nemzeti Bajnokság I
- 1982–83 Nemzeti Bajnokság II
