= Győri Vörös Meteor =

Hungarian football club

- Full name: Győri Vörös Meteor
- Founded: 1923
- Ground: Győri Dózsa Sporttelep
Home colours

Győri Vörös Meteor is a defunct professional football club based in Győr, Győr–Moson–Sopron County, Hungary.

== History ==
Győri Vörös Meteor won the 1950 Nemzeti Bajnokság III season, as Győri SzMTE. However, they finished in the last position in the 1951 Nemzeti Bajnokság II season and were relegated.

== Name changes ==
- II. ker. SC: ? - 1945
- Győri II. ker. MTE: 1945 - 30 August 1948
- 30 August 1948: merger with textile teams
- Győri Kerületi Textiles SE: 30 August 1948 - 20 December 1948
- 20 December 1948: the fusion terminated with textile teams
- Győri II. kerületi MTE: 1948 - 1949
- 1949: merger with Hutter Újtelepi TE
- Győri Szakmaközi MTE: 1949 - 1951
- 1951: merger with Győri Meteor
- Győri Vörös Meteor: 1951 - 1957

== Honours ==
- Nemzeti Bajnokság III:
  - Winners (1): 1950

== Seasons ==
The highest league that Győri Vörös Meteor have ever played was the second division.

Season	Tier	Club's name	Position	Pts
1956	5	Győri Vörös Meteor Áruház	10 / 14	18
1954	3	Győri Vörös Meteor	5 / 14	34
1953	3	Győri Vörös Meteor	1 / 12	33
1952	3	Győri Vörös Meteor	2 / 14	37
1951	2	Győri Vörös Meteor	14 / 14	18
1950 ősz	3	Győri SzMTE	1 / 17	27
1949/1950	3	Győri Szakmaközi MTE	4 / 16	34
1948/1949	3	Győri II. ker. MTE	13 / 16	25
1947/1948	3	II. ker. MTE (Győr)	6 / 16	33
1946/1947	3	II.ker. MTE (Győr)	3 / 12	27
1945/1946	2	II. ker. MTE	5 / 14	32
1944/1945	2	II. ker. SC	13 / 14	2
1944/1945	2	II. ker. SC	0 / 11	
1943/1944	3	II. ker. SC (Győr)	3 / 14	32
1942/1943	4	II. ker. SC	3 / 12	20
1941/1942	4	II. ker. SC	8 / 14	23
1940/1941	4	II. kerület SC (Győr)	5 / 14	27
1939/1940	3	Győri II. ker. SC	9 / 14	24
1938/1939	3	II. kerületi SC	12 / 14	20
1937/1938	2	II. ker. SC	11 / 14	23
1936/1937	2	II. ker. SC (Győr)	9 / 13	22
1935/1936	3	II. ker. SC (Győr)	1 / 12	
1934/1935	3	II. ker. SC	0 / 11	
1933/1934	2	II. ker. SC	12 / 12	13
1932/1933	2	II. ker. SC	10 / 12	19
1931/1932	2	II. ker. SC	8 / 11	17
1930/1931	3	II. kerületi SC	1 / 10	24
1929/1930	3	II. kerületi SC	2 / 13	35
1928/1929	3	II. ker. SC (Győr)	3 / 11	26
1927/1928	3	Győri II. kerületi SC	3 / 11	26
1926/1927	3	II. kerületi SC	1 / 10	30
1925/1926	3	II. kerületi SC	5 / 11	25
1924/1925	3	II. kerületi SC	6 / 8	12
1923/1924	3	II. kerületi SC	3 / 7	16
