= Pécsbányai Bányász =

Hungarian football club

- Full name: Pécsbányai Bányász
- Founded: 1921
- Ground: Pécsbányatelepi-pálya
Home colours

Pécsbányai Bányász is a defunct professional football club based in Pécs, Baranya County, Hungary.

== History ==
Pécsbányai Bányász won the 1950 Nemzeti Bajnokság III season, as Pécsbányatelepi Tárna, and gained promotion to the second division. In the 1951 Nemzeti Bajnokság II, the club finished in the 13th position and remained in the second division.

== Name changes ==
- Pécsbányatelepi Turul Sport Egyesület: 1921 - 1931
- DGT Pécsbányatelepi AC: 1931 - 1945
- Pécsbányatelepi Munkás Sport Egylet: 1945 - 1949
- Pécsbányatelepi Tárna: 1949 - 1950
- Pécsbányai Bányász: 1950 - 1951
- Pécsbányatelepi Bányász: 1951 - 1958
- 1958: merger with Pécsújhegyi Bányász

== Honours ==
- Nemzeti Bajnokság III:
  - Winners (1): 1950

== Seasons ==
The table below shows the seasons of Pécsbányai Bányász.

Season	Tier	Club's name	Position	Pts
1928–29	3	Pécsbányatelepi Turul SE	0 / 7	-
1930–31	2	DGT Pécsbányatelepi AC	12 / 12	9
1931–32	2	Pécsi DGHT Pécsbányatelepi AC	7 / 12	23
1932–33	2	DPAC	5 / 11	
1933–34	2	DPAC	6 / 12	24
1934–35	2	DGT Pécsbányatelepi AC	12 / 12	12
1935–36	3	DGT Pécsbányatelepi AC	0 / 8	
1936–37	3	DPAC	3 / 10	23
1937–38	3	DPAC	1 / 14	47
1938–39	3	DPAC	10 / 12	15
1939–40	3	DPAC	6 / 12	23
1940–41	4	DPAC	5 / 14	29
1941–42	4	DGT Pécsbányatelepi AC	8 / 12	17
1942–43	4	DPAC	1 / 10	14
1943–44	4	Pécsbányatelepi TSE	1 / 11	34
1944–45	3	Pécs-Bányatelepi Turul SE	0 / 12	
1945	2	Pécsbányatelepi MSE	4 / 9	7
1945–46	2	Pécsbányatelepi MSE	10 / 12	15
1947–48	4	Pécsbányatelepi Munkás SE	1 / 8	24
1948–49	3	Pécsbányatelepi Munkás SE	5 / 16	39
1949–50	3	Pécsbányatelepi Tárna	3 / 16	40
1950	3	Pécsbányatelepi Tárna	1 / 15	22
1951	2	Pécsbányatelepi Bányász	13 / 14	19
1952	2	Pécsbányatelepi Bányász	12 / 18	30
1953	2	Pécsbányatelepi Bányász	16 / 16	19
1954	3	Pécsbányatelepi Bányász	7 / 16	31
1955	3	Pécsbányatelepi Bányász	1 / 16	46
1956	3	Pécsbányatelepi Bányász	1 / 16	49
1957	2	Pécsbányatelepi Bányász	6 / 8	12
1957–58	2	Pécsbányatelepi Bányász SC	12 / 19	
