= 1920–21 Nemzeti Bajnokság II =

Nemzeti Bajnokság II
- Season: 1920–21
- Champions: Budapest SE (Kárpáti group); Vívó és Atlétikai Club (Stobbe group)
- Promoted: Vívó és Atlétikai Club
- Relegated: VIII. Kerületi SC (Kárpáti); Erzsébetvárosi LAC (Kárpáti); Wekerletelepi SC (Stobbe); Előre TK (Stobbe)

The 1920–21 Nemzeti Bajnokság II season was the 21st edition of the Nemzeti Bajnokság II.

== League table ==
=== Group 1 (Kárpáti) ===
Pos	Team	Pld	W	D	L	GF	GA	GD	Pts	Relegation
1	Budapest SE	25	17	5	3	40	16	+24	39	
2	Nemzeti SC	25	16	6	3	50	19	+31	38	
3	Kereskedelmi Alkalmazottak OE	25	17	3	5	58	15	+43	37	
4	Rákosszentmihályi TK (Note: Established on 30 August 1920 through the fusion of Rákosszentmihályi AFC and Rákosszentmihályi SC.)	25	14	3	8	47	24	+23	31	
5	Erzsébetfalvi TC	25	10	10	5	35	20	+15	30	
6	Óbudai TE (Note: New name after 11 August 1921: MOVE Óbudai Torna Egylet.)	25	8	10	7	35	30	+5	26	
7	Acélgyári Előre SC (Note: Established in February 1921. The successor of Globus Torna Egylet through the fusion of Acél Torna Egylet and Előre Testgyakorlók Köre. After the championship, the fusion split up, Acél TE remained in the second tier, while Előre TK were relegated to the third tier.)	25	7	7	11	26	38	−12	21	
8	Budapesti TK	25	6	8	11	24	33	−9	20	
9	Újpesti Munkásképző TE	25	7	6	12	24	36	−12	20	
10	Budapesti EVV TSE	25	6	7	12	18	27	−9	19	
11	MÁV Gépgyári SK	25	5	9	11	24	46	−22	19	
12	Vérhalmi FC	25	7	4	14	30	43	−13	18	
13	VIII. kerületi SC (Note: Formerly known as Józsefvárosi Sport Club, in July 1921 mergere with Terézvárosi Torna Club.)	25	6	5	14	13	41	−28	17	Relegation
14	Erzsébetvárosi LAC (Note: Dissolved in February 1921 and withdrew.)	13	1	1	11	8	43	−35	3	Relegation

=== Group 2 (Stobbe) ===
Pos	Team	Pld	W	D	L	GF	GA	GD	Pts	Promotion or relegation
1	Vívó AC	25	17	5	3	51	15	+36	39	Promotion to Nemzeti Bajnokság I
2	Zuglói AC	25	14	7	4	39	17	+22	35	
3	Újpesti Törekvés SE	25	16	2	7	47	26	+21	34	
4	Ékszerészek SC	25	12	6	7	46	25	+21	30	
5	Újpest-Rákospalotai AK	25	9	12	4	41	24	+17	30	
6	Erzsébetfalvai Törekvés SC	25	11	8	6	37	25	+12	30	
7	Testvériség SE	25	12	4	9	46	30	+16	28	
8	Húsiparosok SC	25	10	6	9	51	38	+13	26	
9	V. kerületi Pannónia SC	25	9	7	9	32	32	0	25	
10	Munkás TE	25	8	3	14	26	34	−8	19	
11	Erzsébetfalvi MTK	25	6	6	13	19	47	−28	18	
12	Fővárosi TK	25	3	7	15	17	36	−19	13	
13	Wekerletelepi SC	25	4	3	18	17	73	−56	11	Relegation
14	Előre TK (Note: In 1921 merger with Acél Torna Egylet as Acélgyári Előre Torna Egylet. Withdrew from this group. After the championship, the fusion split up, Acél TE remained in the second tier, while Előre TK were relegated to the third tier.)	13	0	0	13	2	49	−47	0	Relegation

== Promotion playoff final ==
Vívó és Atlétikai Club 3–1 Budapest Sport Egyesület

== Promotion playoff ==
Pos	Team	Pld	W	D	L	GF	GA	GD	Pts
1	Vasasok Sport Clubja	3	2	1	0	7	3	+4	5
2	Budapest Sport Egyesület	3	1	2	0	4	2	+2	4
3	Budapesti Atlétikai Klub	3	1	1	1	3	3	0	3
4	Műegyetemi Athletikai és Football Club	3	0	0	3	2	8	−6	0

== See also ==
- 1920–21 Nemzeti Bajnokság I
