= Miskolci Honvéd SE =

Hungarian football club

- Full name: Miskolci Honvéd Sportegyesület
- Founded: 1950
- Dissolved: 1990
- Ground: DVTK Stadion
Home colours	Away colours

Miskolci Honvéd Sportegyesület was a football club from the town of Miskolc, Hungary.

== History ==
On 5 June 1950, the club was established as Miskolci Honvéd Sportegyesület.

The club won the 1952 Nemzeti Bajnokság II season. Despite the club's victory, Miskolci Honvéd were not promoted to the Nemzeti Bajnokság I since they could not get promotion through the promotion playoff matches against Sztálin Vasmű Építők, Vörös Lobogó Sortex, and Vasas Izzó.

== Name changes ==
- Miskolci Honvéd SE: 1950 – 1962
- Honvéd Papp József SE: 1962 – 1988
- Miskolci Honvéd SE: 1989 – 1990

== Honours ==
=== League ===
- Nemzeti Bajnokság II:
  - Winners (1): 1952
  - Runners-up (1): 1953
  - Third place (1): 1951
- Nemzeti Bajnokság III:
  - Winners (2): 1950, 1982–83
