= Kinizsi Húsos SK =

Hungarian football club

- Full name: Kinizsi Húsos SK
- Founded: 1913
- Dissolved: 1982
- Ground: Húsos-pálya (Ferencváros)
Home colours

Kinizsi Húsos Sport Klub is a defunct professional football club based in Budapest, Hungary.

== History ==
Kinizsi Húsos SK was established as Húsiparosok SC in 1913.

Kinizsi Húsos SK won the 1950 Nemzeti Bajnokság III season, as ÉDOSz Húsos.

On 21 January 1968, Kinizsi played a friendly match with Ferencvárosi TC in front of 5,000 spectators in Vágóhíd utca. Kinizsi Húsos included players such as Dankaházi, Takács, Róth, Projkó, Szabó, Saller, Horváth, Engelmann, Csorba, Czére, and Robodka.

== Name changes ==
- Terézvárosi Sport Kör: ? - 1919
- Húsiparosok Sport Clubja: 1919 - 1926
- Húsos FC: 1926 - 26 November 1928
- 26 November 1928: merger with Pesterzsébeti FSz
- Pesterzsébeti Húsos Football Club: 26 November 1928 - 1 September 1929
- Merkur Football Club: 1 September 1929 - 1930
- Húsiparosok Sport Clubja: 1930 - ?
- Húsipari Munkás Testedző Egyesület: ? - ?
- Húsipari Munkások Sport Clubja: ? - ?
- Húsos Sport Club: ? - 1949
- ÉDOSz Húsos: 1949 - 1951
- Kinizsi Húsos SK: 1951 - 1957
- Húsos SC: 1957 - 1958
- Kinizsi Húsos SK: 1958 - ?

== Honours ==
- Nemzeti Bajnokság III:
  - Winners (1): 1950

== Seasons ==
The table below shows the seasons of Kinizsi Húsos SK.

Season	Tier	Club's name	Position	Pts
1915	4	Terézvárosi SK	5 / 7	3
1916	2	Terézvárosi SK	7 / 10	3
1916–17	3	Terézvárosi SK	9 / 14	4
1917–18	3	Terézvárosi SK	3 / 8	11
1918–19	3	Húsiparosok SC	1 / 12	29
1919–20	2	Húsiparosok SC	4 / 17	39
1920–21	2	Húsiparosok SC	8 / 14	26
1921–22	3	Húsiparosok SC	1 / 15	42
1922–23	2	Húsiparosok SC	7 / 15	28
1923–24	2	Húsiparosok SC	10 / 14	21
1924–25	2	Húsiparosok SC	12 / 14	38
1925–26	-	-	-	-
1926–27	2	Húsos FC	9 / 14	25
1927–28	2	Húsos FC	6 / 12	24
1928–29	2	Pesterzsébeti Húsos FC	6 / 12	22
1929–30	2	Merkur FC	12 / 13	15
1930–31	5	Húsos SC	7 / 14	24
1931–32	5	Húsiparosok SC	7 / 12	19
1932–33	5	Húsos SC	2 / 12	33
1933–34	4	Húsos SC	9 / 13	22
1934–35	4	Húsos SC	11 / 11	10
1935–36	5	Húsos	9 / 10	7
1945–46	4	Húsos SC	4 / 12	27
1946–47	4	Húsos SC	1 / 13	38
1947–48	3	Húsos SC	2 / 16	51
1948–49	3	Húsos SC	2 / 18	50
1949–50	2	ÉDOSz Húsos	14 / 16	21
1950	3	ÉDOSz Húsos	1 / 16	24
1951	3	Kinizsi Húsos	5 / 12	23
1952	3	Kinizsi Húsos	4 / 14	39
1953	3	Kinizsi Húsos	2 / 16	53
1954	3	Kinizsi Húsos	1 / 16	48
1955	3	Kinizsi Húsos	9 / 16	27
1956	3	Kinizsi Husos	5 / 14	33
1957	3	Húsos SC	2 / 8	20
1957–58	3	Húsos SC	15 / 16	13
1958–59	4	Kinizsi Húsos	4 / 16	34
1959–60	4	Húsos	2 / 16	42
1960–61	4	Húsos	5 / 16	35
1961–62	4	Kinizsi Húsos	2 / 16	42
1962–63	4	Húsos	8 / 16	31
1963	5	Húsos SC	7 / 16	17
1964	5	Kinizsi Húsos	5 / 16	34
1965	5	Kinizsi Húsos SC	1 / 14	42
1966	4	Kinizsi Húsos	9 / 16	30
1967	4	Kinizsi Húsos SK	7 / 16	30
1968	4	Kinizsi Húsos SK	8 / 16	28
1969	4	Kinizsi Húsos	8 / 16	29
1970	4	Kinizsi Húsos	9 / 16	13
1970–71	4	Kinizsi Húsos SK	5 / 16	34
1971–72	4	Kinizsi Húsos	15 / 16	23
1972–73	5	Kinizsi Húsos	13 / 16	23
1973–74	5	Kinizsi Húsos	9 / 16	30
1974–75	5	Kinizsi Húsos SK	12 / 16	28
1976–77	5	Kinizsi Húsos	10 / 16	23
1977–78	5	Kinizsi Húsos	13 / 16	24
1978–79	4	Kinizsi Húsos	15 / 16	13
1979–80	5	Kinizsi Húsos	12 / 16	28
1980–81	5	Kinizsi Húsos	15 / 16	11
1981–82	6	Kinizsi Húsos	5 / 16	36

== Notable players ==
- Ernő Egri Erbstein (1926–1928)
