= Kőbányai Textil SC =

Hungarian football club

- Full name: Kőbányai Textilművek Sport Club
- Founded: 1932
- Dissolved: 1981
Home colours

Kőbányai Textil SC is a defunct professional football club based in Kőbánya, Budapest, Hungary.

== History ==
Between 1946 and 1949, the club competed in the second division as Magyar Textil SE.

Although Kőbányai Textilművek Sport Club won the 1950 Nemzeti Bajnokság III season, they did not gain promotion to the second division.

== Name changes ==
- Magyar Textil Sport Egyesület (Győr): 1932 – 1942
- 1942: merger with Kammer SC
- Kammer SE: 1942 – 1943
- Magyar Textil Sport Egyesület: 1943 – 1951
- Kőbányai Vörös Lobogó SK: 1951 – 1957
- Kőbányai Textil SC: 1957 – 1981

== Honours ==
=== League ===
- Nemzeti Bajnokság III:
  - Winners (1): 1950

== Seasons ==
The highest league that Kőbányai Textil SC have ever played was the third division.

Season	Tier	Club's name	Position	Pts
1980–81	5	Kőbányai Textil	16 / 16	
1979–80	5	Kőbányai Textil	9 / 16	30
1978–79	5	Kőbányai Textil	4 / 16	29
1977–78	6	Kőbányai Textil	10 / 16	29
1974–75	6	Kőbányai Textil	0 / 16	
1973–74	6	Kőbányai Textil	4 / 16	36
1972–73	6	Kőbányai Textil	8 / 16	29
1971–72	6	Kőbányai Textil	4 / 16	36
1970–71	5	Kőbányai Textil SK	14 / 16	21
1970	5	Kőbányai Textil	14 / 16	11
1969	6	Kőbányai Textil	2 / 16	43
1968	6	Kőbányai Textil	3 / 16	42
1967	6	Kőbányai Textil SK	8 / 14	26
1966	5	Kőbányai Textil	14 / 14	12
1965	5	Kőbányai Textilművek	10 / 14	23
1964	5	Kőbányai Textil	6 / 16	41
1963	5	Kőbányai Textil	9 / 16	13
1962–63	4	Kőbányai Textil	9 / 16	31
1961–62	4	Kőbányai Textil	9 / 16	27
1960–61	4	Kőbányai Textil	4 / 16	33
1959–60	4	Kőbányai Textil	9 / 16	30
1958–59	4	Kőbányai Textil	10 / 16	27
1957–58	4	Kőbányai Textil SC	4 / 20	52
1957	3	Kőbányai Textiles	7 / 8	8
1956	3	Kőbányai Vörös Lobogó	12 / 16	25
1955	3	Kőbányai Vörös Lobogó	8 / 16	31
1954	3	Kőbányai Vörös Lobogó	5 / 16	36
1953	3	Kőbányai Vörös Lobogó	6 / 16	33
1952	3	Kőbányai Vörös Lobogó	7 / 14	26
1951	3	Kőbányai Vörös Lobogó	6 / 12	23
1950	3	Magyar Textil SE	1 / 16	24
1949–50	2	Magyar Textil SE	15 / 16	20
1948–49	2	Magyar Textil SE	12 / 16	27
1947–48	2	Magyar Textil SE	2 / 14	36
1946–47	2	Magyar Textil SE	5 / 14	28
1945–46	2	Magyar Textil SE	2 / 14	38
1945	2	Magyar Textil SE	5 / 12	28
1944–45	2	Magyar Textil SE	14 / 16	1
1944–45	3	Magyar Textil SE	0 / 14	
1943–44	3	Magyar Textil SE	7 / 15	29
1942–43	3	KamSE	7 / 14	25
