= Tótkomlósi TC =

Hungarian football club

- Full name: Tótkomlósi Torna Club
- Founded: 1 July 1927
- Ground: Karasz János Sporttelep
- Website: totkomlositc.5mp.eu
Home colours

Tótkomlósi Torna Club is a professional football club based in Tótkomlós, Békés County, Hungary.

== History ==
Tótkomlósi TC was established on 1 July 1927.

Tótkomlósi TC won the 1950 Nemzeti Bajnokság III season, as Tótkomlósi DISz MTK.

== Name changes ==
- Tótkomlósi Munkás Testedző Kör: 1920 - 1926
- Tótkomlósi Torna Club: 1926 - 1940
- Tótkomlósi Levente Egyesület: 1940 - 1945
- Tótkomlósi MADISZ: 1945 - 1945
- Tótkomlósi Munkás Testedző Kör: 1945 - 1949
- Tótkomlósi SzMTK: 1949 - 1950
- Tótkomlósi ÉDOSz: 1950 - 1950
- Tótkomlósi DISz MTK: 1950 - 1951
- Tótkomlósi Építők SK: 1951 - 1952
- Tótkomlósi SK/Tótkomlósi FSK: 1952 - ?
- Tótkomlósi TSZ SK: ? - ?
- Tótkomlósi Munkás Testedző Kör: ? - 1962
- Tótkomlósi SZSK: 1962 - ?
- Tótkomlósi Torna Club: ? -

== Honours ==
- Nemzeti Bajnokság III:
  - Winners (1): 1950

== Non-playing staff ==
=== Management ===
As of 8 October 2026

Position	Name
Proprietor	(Hungary) Dávid László
Managing Director	
Director of Sports	
Director of Facility	
Director of Finance	
Director of Communications	

== Seasons ==
The table below shows the seasons of Tótkomlósi TC.

Season	Tier	Club's name	Position	Pts
1927–28	3	Tótkomlósi TC	3 / 7	10
1928–29	3	Tótkomlósi TC	4 / 10	17
1929–30	3	Tótkomlósi TC	1 / 9	30
1930–31	2	Tótkomlósi TC	12 / 12	12
1931–32	2	Tótkomlósi TC	12 / 14	19
1932–33	2	Tótkomlósi TC	6 / 14	29
1933–34	2	Tótkomlósi TC	11 / 14	21
1934–35	2	Tótkomlósi TC	12 / 14	20
1935–36	2	Tótkomlósi TC	8 / 14	24
1936–37	2	Tótkomlósi TC	13 / 13	6
1937–38	2	Tótkomlósi TC	12 / 12	4
1941–42	5	Tótkomlósi LE	2 / 7	19
1942–43	4	Tótkomlósi LE	4 / 14	30
1943–44	4	Tótkomlósi LE	5 / 12	24
1945	2	Tótkomlósi MTK	1 / 7	19
1945–46	2	Tótkomlósi MTK	6 / 17	37
1946–47	3	Tótkomlósi MTK	5 / 14	30
1947–48	3	Tótkomlósi MTK	4 / 16	37
1948–49	3	Tótkomlósi MTK	10 / 16	27
1949–50	3	Tótkomlósi SzMTK	8 / 16	31
1950	3	Tótkomlósi DISz MTK	1 / 17	26
1951	3	Tótkomlósi Építők	9 / 12	16
1952	3	Tótkomlósi SK	7 / 14	24
1953	3	Tótkomlósi SK	8 / 12	18
1954	3	Tótkomlósi FSK	5 / 14	29
1955	3	Tótkomlósi SK	5 / 16	32
1956	3	Tótkomlósi FSK	15 / 16	21
1957	3	Tótkomlósi TC	4 / 7	14
1957–58	3	Tótkomlósi MTK	16 / 16	14
1958–59	4	Tótkomlósi MTK	12 / 16	24
1959–60	4	Tótkomlós	13 / 16	25
1960–61	5	Tótkomlós	1 / 17	50
1961–62	4	Tótkomlósi TSZ SK	12 / 16	24
1962–63	4	Tótkomlós	4 / 16	40
1963	5	Tótkomlós	5 / 18	21
1964	5	Tótkomlós	8 / 18	30+2
1965	5	Tótkomlós	14 / 18	20
1966	5	Tótkomlós	11 / 16	25
1967	5	Tótkomlós	15 / 16	19
1968	6	Tótkomlós	2 / 12	34
1969	6	Tótkomlósi TSZ SK	1 / 12	37
1970	5	Tótkomlósi TSZ	7 / 9	12
1970–71	5	Tótkomlós	17 / 18	19
1971–72	6	Tótkomlós	8 / 15	27
1972–73	6	Tótkomlós	13 / 16	25
1973–74	6	Tótkomlós	3 / 16	38
1974–75	5	Tótkomlós	4 / 14	31
1975–76	5	Tótkomlós	1 / 14	39
1976–77	4	Tótkomlós	13 / 16	24
1977–78	4	Tótkomlós	6 / 17	31
1978–79	3	Tótkomlós	16 / 18	26
1979–80	3	Tótkomlós	14 / 18	28
1980–81	3	Tótkomlósi TC	15 / 18	24
1981–82	4	Tótkomlósi TC	5 / 16	35
1982–83	4	Tótkomlós	13 / 16	25
1983–84	4	Tótkomlósi TK	16 / 16	14
1984–85	5	Tótkomlós	3 / 14	42
1985–86	5	Tótkomlós	3 / 16	39
1986–87	5	Tótkomlós	4 / 16	39
1987–88	5	Tótkomlós	2 / 15	43
1988–89	5	Tótkomlós	2 / 14	44
1989–90	5	Tótkomlós	1 / 14	43
1990–91	4	Tótkomlós	7 / 16	30
1991–92	4	Tótkomlós	6 / 16	31
1992–93	4	Tótkomlósi TC	4 / 16	32
1993–94	4	Tótkomlós	2 / 16	43
1994–95	4	Tótkomlósi TC	1 / 16	56
1995–96	3	Tótkomlósi TC	11 / 16	38
1996–97	3	Tótkomlósi TC	11 / 16	24
1997–98	4	Tótkomlós	14 / 16	25
1998–99	5	Tótkomlós	9 / 16	42
1999–00	5	Tótkomlós	2 / 16	62
2000–01	5	Tótkomlós	10 / 16	34
2001–02	5	Tótkomlósi TC	5 / 16	48
2002–03	5	Tótkomlósi TC	10 / 16	39
2003–04	5	Tótkomlós	10 / 16	41
2004–05	5	Tótkomlós	14 / 16	23
2005–06	4	Gyé-Mobil-Tótkomlósi TC	17 / 18	11
2006–07	5	Tótkomlósi TC	9 / 16	35
2007–08	5	Tótkomlósi TC	4 / 16	58
2008–09	5	Tótkomlósi TC	4 / 16	57
2009–10	5	Tótkomlósi TC	2 / 16	70
2010–11	4	Tótkomlósi TC	7 / 15	42
2011–12	4	Tótkomlósi TC	7 / 16	49
2012–13	4	Tótkomlósi TC	11 / 16	34
2013–14	4	Tótkomlósi TC	14 / 16	19
2014–15	4	Tótkomlósi TE	13 / 16	29
2015–16	4	Tótkomlósi TC	12 / 15	20
2016–17	4	Tótkomlósi TC	13 / 13	8
2018–19	5	Tótkomlósi TC	5 / 12	45
2019–20	5	Tótkomlósi TC	12 / 16	15
2020–21	4	Tótkomlósi TC	6 / 8	13
2020–21	5	Tótkomlósi TC	6 / 11	27
2021–22	5	Tótkomlósi TC	11 / 14	20
2022–23	6	Tótkomlósi TC	5 / 14	42
2023–24	6	Tótkomlósi TC	3 / 12	46
2024–25	5	Tótkomlósi TC	7 / 8	13
2024–25	5	Tótkomlósi TC	3 / 9	34
2025–26	5	Tótkomlósi TC	9 / 15	35
