= FőTAXI SC =

Hungarian football club

- Full name: FőTAXI Sport Club
- Founded: 1932
- Ground: Stefánia út
Home colours

FőTAXI Sport Club is a defunct professional football club based in Zugló, Budapest, Hungary.

== History ==
FŐTAXI SC won the Western group of the 1946–47 Nemzeti Bajnokság II season and gained promotion to the first division.

== Name changes ==
- Autótaxi Sport Club: 1932 - 1940
- did not operate: between 1940 and 1945
- 1945: reestablished through the merger of Zuglói Danuvia SE and Budapesti VSC (later BVSC started their own team in the championship)
- Zuglói MaDISz TE: 1945 - 1946
- 1946. 09.01-én beolvadt a Magyar Országos Gépkocsi Üzemi RT (MOGÜRT)-be
- MOGÜRT SC: 1946 - 1948
- Nagy-Zugló SE: 1948 February
- MOGÜRT SC: 1948 - 1949
- 1947: Szürketaxi merged with MOGÜRT
- Autótaxi SE: 1949 - April 1950
- 18 April 1950: merger with Pestújhelyi MSC
- Autótaxi Munkás Sport Club: 1950 - 1951
- Előre Autótaxi SK: 1951 - 1957
- Autótaxi Munkás Sport Club: 1957 - 1978
- FőTAXI SC: 1978 -

== Honours ==
=== League ===
- Nemzeti Bajnokság III:
  - Winners (1): 1949–50

== Seasons ==
The table below shows FőTAXI SC's seasons.

Season	Tier	Club's name	Position	Pts
1932–33	6	Autótaxi SC	1 / 11	30
1933–34	5	Autótaxi	2 / 13	42
1934–35	4	Autótaxi	1 / 13	37
1935–36	3	Autótaxi SC	6 / 13	24
1936–37	3	Autótaxi	6 / 14	29
1937–38	3	Autótaxi SC	14 / 14	11
1938–39	4	Autótaxi SC	11 / 14	21
1939–40	4	Autótaxi (Taxisok amatőr)	10 / 13	15
1940–41	5	Autótaxi	14 / 14	7
1945	1	Zuglói MADISZ	9 / 12	18
1945–46	1	Zuglói MADISZ	16 / 10	19
1945–46	1	Zuglói MADISZ	10 / 14	21
1946–47	2	MOGÜRT SC	1 / 14	42
1947–48	1	MOGÜRT SC	17 / 17	10
1948–49	2	Autótaxi SE (MOGÜRT)	4 / 16	38
1949–50	2	Autótaxi MSC	16 / 16	19
1950	3	Autótaxi MSC	2 / 16	23
1951	2	Előre Autótaxi	8 / 14	24
1952	2	Előre Autótaxi	16 / 18	27
1953	3	Előre Autótaxi	2 / 16	38
1954	3	Autótaxi	4 / 16	35
1955	3	Autótaxi	3 / 16	39
1956	3	Törekvés Autótaxi	5 / 14	28
1957	3	Autótaxi MSC	5 / 8	15
1957–58	3	Autótaxi Munkás SC	8 / 16	30
1958–59	3	Autótaxi	10 / 16	28
1959–60	3	Autótaxi	9 / 17	29
1960–61	3	Autótaxi	14 / 16	22
1961–62	4	Autótaxi	1 / 16	47
1962–63	3	Autótaxi	10 / 16	25
1963	4	Autótaxi	11 / 16	13
1964	4	Autótaxi SK	14 / 16	23
1965	5	Autótaxi	10 / 14	23
1966	5	Autótaxi	8 / 14	24
1967	5	Autótaxi SC	3 / 16	40
1968	5	Autótaxi	2 / 18	44
1969	4	Autótaxi	10 / 16	29
1970	4	Autótaxi	5 / 16	17
1970–71	4	Autótaxi SC	7 / 16	31
1971–72	4	Autótaxi	6 / 16	32
1972–73	4	Autótaxi	16 / 16	16
1973–74	5	Autótaxi	13 / 16	24
1974–75	5	Autótaxi	1 / 16	45
1975–76	4	Autótaxi SK	13 / 18	27
1976–77	4	Autótaxi MSC	15 / 18	28
1977–78	5	Autótaxi MSC	1 / 16	45
1978–79	3	FŐTAXI	20 / 20	13
1979–80	4	FŐTAXI	4 / 16	34
1980–81	4	FŐTAXI SC	9 / 16	30
1981–82	5	FŐTAXI	11 / 16	23
1982–83	5	Főtaxi	5 / 16	34
1983–84	5	Főtaxi SC	14 / 16	24
1984–85	5	Főtaxi SC	11 / 16	23
1985–86	5	Főtaxi SC	13 / 16	23
1986–87	5	Főtaxi SK	16 / 16	13
