= Pécsi Vasutas SK =

Hungarian football club

Pécsi VSK
- Full name: Pécsi Vasutas Sportkör
- Short name: PVSK
- Founded: 1919
- Ground: PVSK Stadium
- Capacity: 12,000
- Website: http://www.pvsk.hu/Labdarugas
Home colours

Pécsi Vasutas Sportkör is a Hungarian football club from the city of Pécs, Hungary.

== History ==
They took the field for the first time on September 26, 1919, against PMSC-Bőrgyár, and immediately made their debut with a hard-fought 2-2 draw.

Their first golden age was undoubtedly the early 1930s, when PVSK not only won the Hungarian Railway Workers’ Championship but also introduced a local legend to the sport: Very little is known about András Bendekovics, but we do know that he was a member of the Hungarian national team that competed in the 1936 Olympics under the name Bérczes.

However, the undisputed first golden age—one that would satisfy any connoisseur—began in the mid-1940s, even if it did not last long. With the end of World War II, the Hungarian Football Federation (MLSZ) fundamentally reorganized the league, and PVSK from the South Transdanubia region was promoted to NBI/B—where the letter “B” in no way implies that this was not the true first division, but merely a classification.

Pécsi Vasutas Sport Klub debuted in the 1945–46 season of the Hungarian League and finished fifteenth.[1]

On September 25, 1945, in front of 6,000 spectators, the team made its debut against Pestszentlőrinc, securing a 4–2 victory. Although they were unable to avoid relegation, the memories remain no less fond—especially since Hungarian soccer once again gained a local hero: Antal Werner, whose name was Hungarianized to “Vezér,” made his debut on the national team alongside Puskás and Szusza, and on June 29, 1947, in Belgrade, the national team—with him in its ranks—won 3–2.

1952 was another great year; PVSK was promoted once again and played a competitive match against what was then the best team in the world—Honvéd, of course—losing 2–0 to a squad that included Grosics, Lóránt, Bozsik, Budai II, Kocsist, and Puskás. Another season’s end, another relegation.

In the first match of the 1979 season, the Pécs team faced Honvéd and won 2–0. The bad news is that they were relegated at the end of the season. From that point on, PVSK’s path led straight downhill—to NB II, NB III, and then to the county leagues. Last year—2009/2010—they managed to win the county second division championship.

== Name Changes ==
- 1919–1948: Pécsi Vasutas Sport Klub
- 1948–1949: Pécsi Vasutas Sport Egyesület
- 1949–1955: Pécsi Lokomotív Sportkör
- 1955–1956: Pécsi Törekvés Sport Egyesület
- 1956–?: Pécsi Vasutas Sport Klub
- ?-1997: Pécsi Vasutas Sportkör
- 1997: merger with Pécs'96 FC (also known as DD Gáz SC)
- 1997–2000: Pécsi Vasutas Sportkör-Pécs'96
- 2000–2007: Pécsi Vasutas Sportkör
- 2007–?: Pécsi Vasutas Sportkör-Fürge Nyuszi
- 2009: merger with Szentlőrinc SE
- 2010–: Pécsi Vasutas Sportkör

== Honours ==
=== Domestic ===
- Nemzeti Bajnokság II
  - Winners (4): 1945, 1951, 1953, 1978–79
- Nemzeti Bajnokság III:
  - Winners (3): 1961–62, 1977–78, 1993–94

== Seasons ==
The table below shows the seasons of Pécsi VSK.

Season	Tier	Club's name	Position	Pts
1920–21	2	Pécsi Vasutas SK	2 / 8	14
1921–22	2	Pécsi Vasutas SK	4 / 7	7
1922–23	2	Pécsi Vasutas SK	5 / 7	
1923–24	2	Pécsi Vasutas SK	2 / 5	9
1924–25	2	Pécsi Vasutas SK	4 / 6	8
1925–26	2	Pécsi Vasutas SK	3 / 9	20
1926–27	2	Pécsi Vasutas SK	1 / 12	38
1927–28	2	Pécsi Vasutas SK	2 / 9	20
1928–29	2	Pécsi Vasutas SK	1 / 10	29
1929–30	2	Pécsi Vasutas SK	1 / 12	37
1930–31	2	Pécsi Vasutas SK	1 / 12	34
1931–32	2	Pécsi Vasutas SK	1 / 12	35
1932–33	2	Pécsi VSK	1 / 11	
1933–34	2	Pécsi Vasutas SK	2 / 12	35
1934–35	2	Pécsi Vasutas SK	4 / 12	27
1935–36	2	Pécsi VSK	2 / 12	30
1936–37	2	Pécsi VSK	1 / 12	36
1937–38	2	Pécsi VSK	2 / 12	28
1938–39	3	Pécsi VSK	1 / 12	35
1939–40	2	Pécsi Vasutas SK	12 / 14	17
1940–41	3	Pécsi VSK	6 / 12	23
1941–42	3	Pécsi VSK	10 / 12	14
1942–43	3	Pécsi VSK	9 / 14	23
1943–44	3	Pécsi VSK	5 / 13	29
1944–45	2	Pécsi VSK	8 / 14	6
1944–45	3	Pécsi VSK	0 / 12	
1945	2	Pécsi VSK	1 / 9	13
1945–46	1	Pécsi VSK	7 / 14	28
1945–46	1	Pécsi VSK	15 / 10	20
1946–47	2	Pécsi VSK	5 / 14	31
1947–48	2	Pécsi VSK	6 / 14	29
1948–49	2	Pécsi Lokomotív	9 / 16	29
1949–50	2	Pécsi Lokomotív	9 / 16	28
1950	2	Pécsi Lokomotív	9 / 16	14
1951	2	Pécsi Lokomotív	1 / 14	43
1952	1	Pécsi Lokomotív	14 / 14	16
1953	2	Pécsi Lokomotív	1 / 16	39
1954	2	Pécsi Lokomotív	2 / 16	46
1955	2	Pécsi Törekvés	7 / 16	29
1956	2	Pécsi VSK	13 / 16	26
1957–58	2	Pécsi VSK	4 / 19	44
1958–59	2	Pécsi VSK	12 / 16	28
1959–60	2	Pécsi VSK	14 / 16	26
1960–61	3	Pécsi VSK	4 / 16	39
1961–62	3	Pécsi VSK	1 / 16	44
1962–63	2	Pécsi VSK	9 / 16	31
1963	3	Pécsi VSK	3 / 18	22
1964	3	Pécsi VSK	4 / 18	39
1965	3	Pécsi VSK	9 / 18	34
1966	3	Pécsi VSK	4 / 18	45
1967	3	Pécsi VSK	13 / 16	27
1968	3	Pécsi VSK	8 / 16	30
1969	3	Pécsi VSK	14 / 16	27
1970	4	Pécsi VSK	1 / 16	24
1970–71	4	Pécsi VSK	1 / 16	47
1971–72	3	Pécsi VSK	9 / 16	28
1972–73	3	Pécsi VSK	3 / 16	35
1973–74	3	Pécsi VSK	4 / 16	35
1974–75	3	Pécsi VSK	2 / 20	53
1975–76	3	Pécsi VSK	8 / 20	37
1976–77	3	Pécsi VSK	2 / 20	50
1977–78	3	Pécsi VSK	1 / 20	51
1978–79	2	Pécsi VSK	1 / 20	54
1979–80	1	Pécsi VSK	18 / 18	15
1980–81	2	Pécsi VSK	5 / 20	44
1981–82	2	Pécsi VSK	11 / 16	25
1982–83	3	Pécsi VSK	11 / 16	26
1983–84	3	Pécsi VSK	12 / 16	27
1984–85	3	Pécsi VSK	8 / 16	31
1985–86	3	Pécsi VSK	3 / 16	41
1986–87	3	Pécsi VSK	5 / 16	32
1987–88	3	Pécsi VSK	16 / 16	20
1988–89	4	Pécsi VSK	5 / 16	39
1989–90	4	Pécsi VSK	1 / 16	62
1990–91	3	Pécsi VSK	3 / 16	38
1991–92	3	Pécsi VSK	2 / 16	41
1992–93	3	Pécsi VSK	3 / 16	37
1993–94	3	Pécsi VSK	1 / 16	48
1994–95	2	Pécsi VSK	15 / 16	13
1995–96	3	Pécsi VSK	2 / 16	62
1996–97	3	Pécsi VSK	9 / 16	39
1997–98	4	Pécsi VSK-Pécs '96 FC	1 / 16	69
1998–99	3	Pécsi VSK-Pécs '96 FC	7 / 16	41
1999–2000	3	Pécsi VSK-Pécs '96 FC	13 / 16	20
2000	3	Pécsi VSK	1 / 8	31
2000–01	3	Pécsi VSK	2 / 12	46
2001–02	3	Pécsi VSK	9 / 13	25
2002–03	3	Pécsi VSK	12 / 12	2
2002–03	3	Pécsi VSK	12 / 12	2
2003–04	4	Pécsi VSK	14 / 16	25
2004–05	4	Pécsi VSK	12 / 15	33
2005–06	3	Pécsi VSK	13 / 16	31
2006–07	3	Pécsi VSK	11 / 14	27
2007–08	3	Pécsi VSK Fürge Nyuszi	15 / 18	32
2008–09	3	Pécsi VSK - Fürge Nyuszi	8 / 16	45
2009–10	5	Pécsi VSK	1 / 17	67
2010–11	4	Pécsi VSK	5 / 16	55
2011–12	4	Pécsi VSK	13 / 16	29
2012–13	4	Pécsi VSK	9 / 16	41
2013–14	4	Pécsi VSK Labdarúgó Kft	13 / 16	24
2014–15	4	Pécsi VSK	7 / 16	37
2015–16	4	Pécsi VSK	12 / 16	23
2016–17	4	Pécsi Vasutas SK	8 / 14	38
2017–18	4	Pécsi VSK	6 / 15	49
2018–19	4	Pécsi VSK	8 / 15	38
2019–20	4	Pécsi VSK	5 / 14	23
2020–21	4	Pécsi VSK	4 / 15	56
2021–22	4	Pécsi VSK	5 / 15	55
2022–23	4	Pécsi VSK	4 / 15	46
2023–24	4	Pécsi VSK	7 / 8	20
2024–25	4	Pécsi VSK	9 / 9	16
2025–26	4	Pécsi VSK	7 / 10	27
