= Kiskunfélegyházi TK =

Hungarian football club

- Full name: Kiskunfélegyházi Testedzők Köre
- Founded: 1923
- Dissolved: 2003
- Ground: Kiskunfélegyházi Városi ifjúsági sporttelep
Home colours

Kiskunfélegyházi Testedzők Köre is a defunct professional football club based in Kiskunfélegyháza, Bács-Kiskun County, Hungary.

== History ==
Kiskunfélegyházi TK won the 1950 Nemzeti Bajnokság III season, as Kiskunfélegyházi SzTK.

== Name changes ==
- Kiskunfélegyházi Testedzők Köre: 1923 - 1948
- 1948: merger with Kiskunfélegyházi Vasutas SE
- Kiskunfélegyházi MTK: 1948 - 1949
- Kiskunfélegyházi SzTK: 1949 - 1951
- Kiskunfélegyházi Vasas SK: 1951 - 1957
- 1957: merger with Kiskunfélegyházi Spartacus
- Kiskunfélegyházi Vasas-Építők: 1957 - 1957
- Kiskunfélegyházi Építők: 1957 - 1961
- 1961: merger with Kiskunfélegyházi Bányászati Vasas
- Kiskunfélegyházi Bányászati Vasas: 1961 - 1962
- Kiskunfélegyházi Vegyipar: 1962 - 1965
- Kiskunfélegyházi Vasas: 1965 - 1974
- 1974: the football department dissolved
- 1985: merger with Kiskunfélegyházi Szövetkezeti SE and Kiskunfélegyházi Húsos SK as Kiskunfélegyházi TK
- Kiskunfélegyházi Testedzők Köre: August 1985 - 2003
- 2003: merger with Kiskunfélegyházi Honvéd

== Honours ==
- Nemzeti Bajnokság III:
  - Winners (1): 1950

== Seasons ==
The table below shows the seasons of Kiskunfélegyházi TK.

Season	Tier	Club's name	Position	Pts
1924–25	3	Kiskunfélegyházi TK	1 / 9	26
1925–26	2	Kiskunfélegyházi TK	10 / 10	6
1926–27	3	Kiskunfélegyházi TK	1 / 6	20
1927–28	2	Kiskunfélegyházi TK	6 / 10	15
1928–29	2	Kiskunfélegyházi TK	3 / 12	29
1929–30	2	Kiskunfélegyházi TK	3 / 12	29
1930–31	2	Kiskunfélegyházi TK	5 / 12	22
1931–32	2	Kiskunfélegyházi TK	4 / 14	36
1932–33	2	Kiskunfélegyházi TK	4 / 14	30
1933–34	2	Kiskunfélegyházi TK	10 / 15	24
1934–35	2	Kiskunfélegyházi TK	9 / 14	23
1935–36	2	Kiskunfélegyházi TK	9 / 14	23
1936–37	2	Kiskunfélegyházi TK	13 / 13	14
1937–38	3	Kiskunfélegyházi TK	1 / 10	32
1938–39	3	Kiskunfélegyházi TK	12 / 12	4
1939–40	4	Kiskunfélegyházi TK	2 / 10	26
1940–41	4	Kiskunfélegyházi TK	11 / 12	19
1941–42	5	Kiskunfélegyházi TK	3 / 10	13
1942–43	5	Kiskunfélegyházi TK	2 / 10	29
1943–44	5	Kiskunfélegyházi TK	1 / 10	34
1945	2	Kiskunfélegyházi TK	4 / 7	8
1945–46	2	Kiskunfélegyházi TK	3 / 11	27
1946–47	3	Kiskunfélegyházi TK	2 / 14	42
1947–48	3	Kiskunfélegyházi TK	2 / 14	38
1948–49	3	Kiskunfélegyházi MTK	2 / 16	41
1949–50	3	Kiskunfélegyházi SzTK (Kiskunfélegyházi MTK)	4 / 16	38
1950	3	Kiskunfélegyházi SzTK	1 / 16	27
1951	2	Kiskunfélegyházi Vasas	12 / 14	21
1952	2	Kiskunfélegyházi Vasas	13 / 18	28
1953	2	Kiskunfélegyházi Vasas	15 / 16	22
1954	3	Kiskunfélegyházi Vasas	5 / 14	31
1955	3	Kiskunfélegyházi Vasas	4 / 14	35
1956	3	Kiskunfélegyházi Vasas	11 / 16	23
1957	3	Kiskunfélegyházi Vasas-Építők	4 / 10	19
1957–58	3	Kiskunfélegyházi Építők	3 / 16	40
1958–59	3	Kiskunfélegyházi Építők	13 / 16	26
1959–60	4	Kiskunfélegyházi Építők	1 / 16	48
1960–61	3	Kiskunfélegyházai Építők	16 / 16	8
1961–62	4	Kiskunfélegyházi Bányászati Vasas	3 / 17	39
1962–63	4	Kiskunfélegyházi Vegyipar	4 / 16	37
1963	5	Kiskunfélegyházi Vegyipar	1 / 14	26
1964	5	Kiskunfélegyházi Vasas	1 / 16	43
1965	4	Kiskunfélegyházi Vasas	1 / 16	42
1966	3	Kiskunfélegyházi Vasas	16 / 18	27
1967	3	Kiskunfélegyházi Vasas TK	14 / 16	27
1968	3	Kiskunfélegyházi Vasas TK	9 / 16	27
1969	3	Kiskunfélegyházi Vasas	6 / 16	33
1970	3	Kiskunfélegyházi Vasas	12 / 16	13
1970–71	3	Kiskunfélegyházi Vasas	16 / 16	17
1971–72	4	Kiskunfélegyházi Vasas	6 / 16	32
1972–73	4	Kiskunfélegyházi Vasas	8 / 16	29
1973–74	4	Kiskunfélegyházi Vasas	6 / 16	36
1974–75	-	-	-	-
1975–76	-	-	-	-
1976–77	-	-	-	-
1977–78	-	-	-	-
1978–79	-	-	-	-
1979–80	-	-	-	-
1980–81	-	-	-	-
1981–82	-	-	-	-
1982–83	-	-	-	-
1983–84	-	-	-	-
1984–85	-	-	-	-
1985–86	4	Kiskunfélegyházi TK	5 / 16	31
1986–87	4	Kiskunfélegyházi TK	13 / 17	28
1987–88	4	Kiskunfélegyházi TK	12 / 16	25
1988–89	4	Kiskunfélegyházi TK	13 / 16	22
1989–90	4	Kiskunfélegyházi TK	11 / 16	36
1990–91	4	Kiskunfélegyházi TK	15 / 16	21
1991–92	5	Kiskunfélegyházi TK	8 / 16	32
1992–93	5	Kiskunfélegyházi TK	2 / 16	45
1993–94	3	Kiskunfélegyházi TK	9 / 16	30
1994–95	3	Kiskunfélegyházi TK	7 / 16	48
1995–96	3	Kiskunfélegyházi TK	2 / 16	59
1996–97	3	Kiskunfélegyházai TK	2 / 16	52
1997–98	3	Kiskunfélegyházi TK	11 / 16	35
1998–99	3	Kiskunfélegyházi TK-Hungary MEAT	4 / 16	41
1999–00	3	Kiskunfélegyháza	13 / 16	21
2000	3	Kiskunfélegyházi TK	4 / 8	26
2000–01	4	Kiskunfélegyházai TK	1 / 11	50
2001–02	3	Kiskunfélegyházi TK	13 / 13	
2002–03	5	Kiskunfélegyháza	15 / 16	29
