= 1951 Nemzeti Bajnokság II =

Nemzeti Bajnokság II
- Season: 1951
- Champions: Pécsi Lokomotív (West); Budapesti Gyárépítők (Central); Budapesti Postás SE (East); Vörös Lobogó Keltex (South)
- Promoted: Pécsi Lokomotív (West); Budapesti Postás SE (East)
- Relegated: Győri Vörös Meteor (West); Óbudai Építők (Central); Vörös Lobogó Magyar Pamut (Central); Vasas Kerámia (South)

The 1951 Nemzeti Bajnokság II was the 52nd season of the Nemzeti Bajnokság II, the second tier of the Hungarian football league.

== League table ==
=== Western group ===
Pos	Team	Pld	W	D	L	GF	GA	GD	Pts	Promotion or relegation
1	Pécsi Lokomotív	26	21	1	4	67	23	+44	43	Promoted to Nemzeti Bajnokság I
2	Tatabányai Bányász (Note: Formerly known as Tatabányai Tárna.)	26	18	6	2	58	25	+33	42	
3	Csillaghegyi Vörös Lobogó (Note: Formerly known as Csillaghegyi Textil.)	26	12	7	7	53	38	+15	31	
4	Pápai Vörös Lobogó (Note: Formerly known as Pápai Textil.)	26	9	10	7	55	37	+18	28	
5	Pécsújhegyi Bányász (Note: Formerly known as Pécsi MESzHART Dinamó.)	26	8	11	7	50	43	+7	27	
6	Pécsi Vörös Lobogó (Note: Formerly known as Pécsi Bőripari Dolgozók SE.)	26	10	6	10	41	44	−3	26	
7	Nagykanizsai Bányász (Note: Formerly known as Olajmunkás SE (Nagykanizsa).)	26	8	8	10	37	38	−1	24	
8	Komlói Bányász (Note: Formerly known as Komlói SzSE.)	26	9	5	12	51	58	−7	23	
9	Soproni Lokomotív	26	8	7	11	51	65	−14	23	
10	Tatabányai Építők	26	7	7	12	30	44	−14	21	
11	Nagykanizsai Lokomotív (Note: Formerly known asNagykanizsai VSK.)	26	10	0	16	44	64	−20	20	
12	Szombathelyi Vörös Lobogó	26	7	5	14	50	68	−18	19	
13	Pécsbányatelepi Bányász	26	6	7	13	35	53	−18	19	
14	Győri Vörös Meteor (Note: On 15 February 1951, Győri SzMTE was established after the merger with Győri Meteor.)	26	6	6	14	41	63	−22	18	Relegation

=== Central group ===
Pos	Team	Pld	W	D	L	GF	GA	GD	Pts	Relegation
1	Budapesti Gyárépítők (Note: Formerly known as Bp. Gyárépítők MTE.)	26	18	5	3	59	31	+28	41	
2	Váci Vörös Lobogó (Note: Formerly known as Váci DTK.)	26	17	4	5	65	37	+28	38	
3	Budapesti Építők (Note: Formerly known as Építők KSE.)	26	13	7	6	46	33	+13	33	
4	IV. kerületi Vörös Lobogó (Note: Formerly known as Bőripari Dolgozók SE, new name: VL Duna-cipőgyár.)	26	12	5	9	47	39	+8	29	
5	Szikra Gázművek (Note: Formerly known as Főv. Gázművek Lombik SE.)	26	11	6	9	44	37	+7	28	
6	Vasas Elektromos (Note: Formerly known as Elektromos MSE.)	26	11	6	9	41	45	−4	28	
7	Kinizsi Dohánygyár (Note: Formerly known as ÉDOSz Lendület.)	26	10	7	9	46	44	+2	27	
8	Előre Autótaxi (Note: Formerly known as Autótaxi MSC.)	26	10	4	12	41	48	−7	24	
9	Vasas Ganzvagon (Note: Formerly known as Ganz Vasas.)	26	6	10	10	41	42	−1	22	
10	Csepeli Szikra (Note: Formerly known as Csepeli Papírgyári Lombik.)	26	7	6	13	28	34	−6	20	
11	III. kerületi Vörös Lobogó (Note: Formerly known as III.ker. Textilmunkás, new name: VL Textilfestő.)	26	6	8	12	33	46	−13	20	
12	Vörös Meteor Nemzeti Bank (Note: Formerly known as Vörös Meteor, fusion with VM Egyetértés as VM Egyetértés MNB, from 20 September 1952 as Bp. Vörös Meteor.)	26	7	6	13	34	50	−16	20	
13	Óbudai Építők	26	6	6	14	24	41	−17	18	Relegation
14	Vörös Lobogó Magyar Pamut (Note: Formerly known as Magyar Pamut SC.)	26	7	2	17	40	62	−22	16	Relegation

=== Eastern group ===
Pos	Team	Pld	W	D	L	GF	GA	GD	Pts	Promotion
1	Budapesti Postás (Note: Formerly known as Postás SE.)	26	18	5	3	86	32	+54	41	Promotion to Nemzeti Bajnokság I
2	Ózdi Vasas	26	17	2	7	54	31	+23	36	
3	Miskolci Honvéd SE	26	13	6	7	50	39	+11	32	
4	Budapesti Lokomotív	26	9	13	4	37	20	+17	31	
5	Debreceni Lokomotív	26	13	3	10	53	37	+16	29	
6	Salgótarjáni Vasas	26	11	6	9	61	51	+10	28	
7	Miskolci Lokomotív	26	10	6	10	56	59	−3	26	
8	Debreceni Honvéd SE	26	9	6	11	53	52	+1	24	
9	Hatvani Lokomotív (Note: Formerly known as Hatvani VSK.)	26	8	7	11	44	53	−9	23	
10	Sajószentpéteri Bányász (Note: Formerly known as Sajószentpéteri Tárna.)	26	7	7	12	41	45	−4	21	
11	Egri Fáklya (Note: Formerly known as Egri Erdészeti SzTK, majd Egri Pedagógus SE 1951.05.25-ig.)	26	6	9	11	43	61	−18	21	
12	Perecesi Bányász (Note: Formerly known as Perecesi Tárna.)	26	9	3	14	30	47	−17	21	
13	Miskolci Építők	26	7	7	12	31	55	−24	21	
14	Nyíregyházi Vasas Elektromos (Note: Formerly known as Nyíregyházi Elektromos, merger with Nyíregyházi Építőkkel.)	26	4	2	20	26	83	−57	10	

=== Southern group ===
Pos	Team	Pld	W	D	L	GF	GA	GD	Pts	Relegation
1	Vörös Lobogó Keltex (Note: Formerly known as Kelenföldi Textil.)	26	18	4	4	53	29	+24	40	
2	Budapesti Előre (Note: Formerly known as Előre SE.)	26	15	6	5	79	37	+42	36	
3	Budapesti Szikra (Note: Formerly known as Központi Lombik TK.)	26	10	9	7	41	39	+2	29	
4	Szolnoki Lokomotív	26	10	8	8	42	31	+11	28	
5	Békéscsabai Építők (Note: Formerly known as Békéscsabai SzSE.)	26	11	6	9	53	45	+8	28	
6	Kinizsi Sörgyár (Note: Formerly known as X.ker. ÉDOSz, placed to the central group.)	26	11	4	11	45	43	+2	26	
7	Gyulai Építők (Note: Formerly known as Gyulai SzSE.)	26	10	6	10	48	46	+2	26	
8	Kecskeméti Kinizsi (Note: Formerly known as Kecskeméti SzTE.)	26	8	9	9	43	45	−2	25	
9	Szolnoki Papírgyári Szikra (Note: In June 1948, the fusion terminated, Szolnoki Papirgyári Szikra played in the Nemzeti Bajnokság II.)	26	10	5	11	34	40	−6	25	
10	Szegedi Lokomotív	26	8	7	11	30	46	−16	23	
11	Ceglédi Lokomotív (Note: Formerly known as Ceglédi VSK.)	26	8	6	12	41	51	−10	22	
12	Kiskunfélegyházi Vasas (Note: Formerly known as Kiskunfélegyházi SzTK.)	26	7	7	12	25	46	−21	21	
13	Vasas Kerámia (Note: Formerly known as Kerámia SE.)	26	8	3	15	36	50	−14	19	Relegation
14	Vasas MÁVAG (Note: Formerly known as MÁVAG, based on the decision of OTSB were not relegated.)	26	6	4	16	29	51	−22	16	

=== Promotion playoff ===
Pos	Team	Pld	W	D	L	GF	GA	GD	Pts
1	Budapesti Postás	3	2	1	0	8	1	+7	5
2	Pécsi Lokomotív	3	2	1	0	9	3	+6	5
3	Vörös Lobogó Keltex	3	0	1	2	1	6	−5	1
4	Budapesti Gyárépítők	3	0	1	2	1	9	−8	1

== See also ==
- 1951 Nemzeti Bajnokság I
