= 1980–81 Nemzeti Bajnokság II =

Nemzeti Bajnokság II
- Season: 1980–81
- Champions: Haladás Vasutas SE (West); Szegedi EOL AK (Central); Ózdi Kohász SE (East)
- Promoted: Haladás Vasutas SE (West); Szegedi EOL AK (Central); Ózdi Kohász SE (East)
- Relegated: several

The 1980–81 Nemzeti Bajnokság II was the 83rd season of the Nemzeti Bajnokság II, the second tier of the Hungarian football league.

== League table ==
=== Western group ===
Pos	Team	Pld	W	D	L	GF	GA	GD	Pts	Promotion or relegation
1	Haladás Vasutas SE	38	20	17	1	92	37	+55	57	Promotion to Nemzeti Bajnokság I
2	Nagykanizsai Olajbányász SE	38	19	12	7	80	50	+30	50	
3	Keszthelyi Haladás SC	38	20	9	9	65	48	+17	49	
4	Sabaria SE	38	18	11	9	46	37	+9	47	
5	Pécsi Vasutas SK	38	16	12	10	57	35	+22	44	
6	Tapolcai Bauxitbányász SE	38	18	8	12	58	54	+4	44	
7	Mohács-Véméndi TE	38	15	13	10	47	33	+14	43	
8	Komlói Bányász SK	38	15	10	13	44	39	+5	40	
9	Bábolnai SE	38	13	13	12	38	52	−14	39	
10	MÁV Dunántúli AC	38	13	12	13	63	57	+6	38	
11	Sopron SE	38	13	10	15	51	44	+7	36	
12	Szekszárdi Dózsa SC	38	12	12	14	38	36	+2	36	
13	Bakony Vegyész TC	38	10	16	12	46	51	−5	36	
14	Ajkai Aluminium SK	38	13	9	16	52	54	−2	35	
15	Várpalotai Bányász SK	38	11	12	15	49	59	−10	34	
16	Dombóvári MSC	38	9	14	15	40	68	−28	32	
17	Sellyei SK	38	11	8	19	53	69	−16	30	Relegation to Nemzeti Bajnokság III
18	Honvéd Rákóczi SE	38	9	10	19	40	56	−16	28	Relegation to Nemzeti Bajnokság III
19	NIKE Fűzfői SE	38	8	7	23	38	67	−29	23	Relegation to Nemzeti Bajnokság III
20	Péti Munkás TE	38	8	3	27	43	94	−51	19	Relegation to Nemzeti Bajnokság III

=== Central group ===
Pos	Team	Pld	W	D	L	GF	GA	GD	Pts	Promotion or relegation
1	Szegedi EOL AK	38	24	9	5	68	30	+38	57	Promotion to Nemzeti Bajnokság I
2	Ganz-MÁVAG SE	38	16	15	7	74	52	+22	47	
3	Honvéd Bem József SE	38	16	13	9	61	47	+14	45	
4	Balassagyarmati SE	38	17	11	10	60	47	+13	45	
5	Székesfehérvári MÁV Előre SC	38	16	13	9	58	54	+4	45	
6	Budafoki MTE Kinizsi	38	18	8	12	58	42	+16	44	
7	Kecskeméti SC	38	16	12	10	49	36	+13	44	
8	Pénzügyőr SE	38	14	13	11	46	45	+1	41	
9	Kossuth Katonai FSE	38	11	17	10	54	47	+7	39	
10	Szegedi Dózsa	38	14	8	16	67	55	+12	36	
11	Dorogi AC	38	13	10	15	52	52	0	36	
12	Építők SC	38	13	10	15	44	54	−10	36	
13	Váci Izzó MTE	38	11	13	14	55	56	−1	35	
14	22.sz Volán SE	38	11	12	15	43	58	−15	34	
15	BKV Előre SC	38	10	14	14	32	50	−18	34	
16	Budapesti VSC	38	12	9	17	39	52	−13	33	
17	DÉLÉP SC Szeged	38	12	9	17	50	64	−14	33	Relegation to Nemzeti Bajnokság III
18	Budapesti Spartacus	38	12	8	18	43	58	−15	32	Relegation to Nemzeti Bajnokság III
19	Dunaújvárosi Építők	38	8	7	23	43	71	−28	23	Relegation to Nemzeti Bajnokság III
20	Oroszlányi Bányász	38	5	11	22	31	57	−26	21	Relegation to Nemzeti Bajnokság III

=== Eastern group ===
Pos	Team	Pld	W	D	L	GF	GA	GD	Pts	Promotion or relegation
1	Ózdi Kohász SE	38	21	10	7	61	34	+27	52	Promotion to Nemzeti Bajnokság I
2	Gyulai SE	38	18	13	7	59	36	+23	49	
3	Hódmezővásárhelyi MSE	38	16	13	9	59	41	+18	45	
4	Debreceni Universitas SE	38	17	10	11	48	31	+17	44	
5	Salgótarjáni TC	38	17	10	11	53	39	+14	44	
6	Honvéd Szabó Lajos SE	38	15	12	11	50	35	+15	42	
7	Honvéd Papp József SE	38	14	14	10	59	49	+10	42	
8	Gyöngyösi SE	38	15	11	12	42	37	+5	41	
9	Debreceni Kinizsi	38	14	12	12	56	50	+6	40	
10	Kazincbarcikai Vegyész	38	14	12	12	50	49	+1	40	
11	Miskolci VSC	38	15	10	13	66	67	−1	40	
12	Eger SE	38	14	12	12	45	46	−1	40	
13	Szolnoki MÁV-MTE	38	12	14	12	56	55	+1	38	
14	Honvéd Asztalos János SE	38	14	9	15	48	50	−2	37	
15	Lehel SC	38	11	12	15	42	51	−9	34	
16	Szarvasi Főiskola Spartacus	38	12	9	17	42	45	−3	33	
17	Nagybátonyi Bányász SC	38	11	8	19	54	68	−14	30	Relegation to Nemzeti Bajnokság III
18	Borsod Volán	38	9	11	18	45	70	−25	29	Relegation to Nemzeti Bajnokság III
19	Karcagi SE	38	8	7	23	37	78	−41	23	Relegation to Nemzeti Bajnokság III
20	Hajdúböszörményi Bocskai	38	4	9	25	32	73	−41	17	Relegation to Nemzeti Bajnokság III

== See also ==
- 1980–81 Magyar Kupa
- 1980–81 Nemzeti Bajnokság I
