= 1974–75 Nemzeti Bajnokság II =

Nemzeti Bajnokság II
- Season: 1974–75
- Champions: Szegedi EOL
- Promoted: Szegedi EOL (winners); Kaposvári Rákóczi FC (runners-up)
- Relegated: Ganz-MÁVAG SE; Egri Dózsa; Ózdi Kohász SE

The 1974–75 Nemzeti Bajnokság II was the 77th season of the Nemzeti Bajnokság II, the second tier of the Hungarian football league.

== League table ==
Pos	Team	Pld	W	D	L	GF	GA	GD	Pts	Promotion or relegation
1	Szegedi EOL	38	20	8	10	67	42	+25	48	Promotion to Nemzeti Bajnokság I
2	Kaposvári Rákóczi SC	38	20	7	11	59	34	+25	47	Promotion to Nemzeti Bajnokság I
3	Volán SC	38	20	6	12	58	41	+17	46	
4	Komlói Bányász SK	38	14	18	6	49	38	+11	46	
5	Debreceni VSC	38	16	11	11	52	43	+9	43	
6	Győri MÁV DAC	38	14	14	10	53	43	+10	42	
7	Dunaújvárosi Kohász SE	38	14	14	10	51	44	+7	42	
8	Oroszlányi Bányász SK	38	12	16	10	39	46	−7	40	
9	Dorogi AC	38	12	15	11	36	38	−2	39	
10	Szekszárdi Dózsa	38	14	11	13	50	61	−11	39	
11	Várpalotai Bányász SK	38	13	11	14	49	45	+4	37	
12	Szolnoki MTE	38	12	13	13	39	39	0	37	
13	Nagykanizsai Olajbányász	38	12	11	15	56	58	−2	35	
14	Kossuth KFSE	38	13	9	16	42	50	−8	35	
15	Budafoki MTE Kinizsi	38	11	12	15	43	48	−5	34	
16	Budapesti Spartacus SC	38	10	13	15	57	62	−5	33	
17	FŐSPED Szállítók SE	38	11	11	16	44	56	−12	33	
18	Ganz-MÁVAG SE	38	8	13	17	37	46	−9	29	Relegated to Nemzeti Bajnokság III
19	Egri Dózsa	38	11	7	20	41	63	−22	29	Relegated to Nemzeti Bajnokság III
20	Ózdi Kohász	38	9	8	21	35	60	−25	26	Relegated to Nemzeti Bajnokság III

== See also ==
- 1974–75 Magyar Kupa
- 1974–75 Nemzeti Bajnokság I
