= 1976–77 Nemzeti Bajnokság III =

Nemzeti Bajnokság III
- Season: 1976–77
- Champions: Váci Híradás SE (Northwest); BKV Előre SC (Southwest); Kazincbarcikai Vegyész SE (Northeast); Békéscsabai TASK (Southeast)
- Promoted: Váci Híradás SE (Northwest); BKV Előre SC (Southwest); Kazincbarcikai Vegyész SE (Northeast); Békéscsabai TASK (Southeast)

The 1976–77 Nemzeti Bajnokság III season was the 1st edition of the Nemzeti Bajnokság III.

== League tables ==
=== Northwestern group ===
Pos	Teams	Pld	W	D	L	GF	GA	GD	Pts	Promotion or relegation
1	Váci Híradás SE	38	22	12	4	67	24	43	56	Promotion to Nemzeti Bajnokság II
2	Bábolnai SE	38	20	7	11	65	46	19	47	
3	Dunakeszi VSE	38	21	5	12	68	51	17	47	
4	Sabaria SE	38	19	9	10	56	40	16	47	
5	Honvéd Rákóczi SE	38	20	6	12	67	44	23	46	
6	Soproni Közlekedési SE	38	19	6	13	73	58	15	44	
7	Répcelaki Bányász SK	38	16	11	11	49	44	5	43	
8	Bauxitbányász SE	38	17	8	13	75	62	13	42	
9	Ajkai Alumínium SK	38	16	10	12	60	48	12	42	
10	Péti MTE	38	18	6	14	58	51	7	42	
11	Győri Dózsa SK	38	17	7	14	56	50	6	41	Relegation to Megyei Bajnokság I
12	Motim TE	38	15	9	14	70	61	9	39	Relegation to Megyei Bajnokság I
13	Körmendi Dózsa FMTE	38	12	10	16	64	70	-6	34	Relegation to Megyei Bajnokság I
14	AURAS SE	38	14	6	18	45	57	-12	34	
15	Bakony Vegyész TC	38	11	11	16	45	54	-9	33	
16	Ajkai Bányász	38	12	7	19	49	76	-27	31	Relegation to Megyei Bajnokság I
17	Latex Kőszegi SE	38	10	7	21	40	63	-23	27	
18	Honvéd Thury György SE	38	7	11	20	49	73	-24	25	Relegation to Megyei Bajnokság I
19	Honvéd Schönherz SE	38	7	8	23	41	68	-27	22	Relegation to Megyei Bajnokság I
20	Zalaszentgróti Spartacus	38	6	6	26	45	102	-57	18	Relegation to Megyei Bajnokság I

=== Southwestern group ===
Pos	Teams	Pld	W	D	L	GF	GA	GD	Pts	Promotion or relegation
1	BKV Előre SC	38	28	6	4	86	23	63	62	Promotion to Nemzeti Bajnokság II
2	Pécsi VSK	38	21	8	9	82	39	43	50	
3	Perbáli TSZ SK	38	18	13	7	72	44	28	49	
4	Véméndi TSZ SK	38	17	13	8	70	47	23	47	
5	Dunaújvárosi Építők SK	38	16	14	8	62	33	29	46	
6	Siófoki Bányász SE	38	16	13	9	57	39	18	45	
7	Pénzügyőr SE	38	16	12	10	72	52	20	44	
8	Budapesti Spartacus SC	38	15	14	9	66	47	19	44	
9	Budapesti Építők SC	38	16	10	12	57	36	21	42	
10	Honvéd Kiss János SE	38	16	10	12	66	62	4	42	
11	EMG SK Sashalom	38	15	12	11	43	39	4	42	Relegation to Megyei Bajnokság I
12	22. sz. Volán Szállítók	38	14	13	11	48	43	5	41	
13	Enyingi Medosz	38	15	10	13	56	58	-2	40	
14	Szigetvári VSZ SE	38	12	12	14	48	61	-13	36	Relegation to Megyei Bajnokság I
15	Paksi SE	38	11	8	19	56	78	-22	30	
16	Ikarus Alba Regia	38	8	12	18	47	77	-30	28	
17	Lőrinci Fonó	38	6	11	21	37	69	-32	23	
18	Mázaszászvári Bányász	38	5	12	21	49	74	-25	22	
19	Sárisápi Bányász	38	5	8	25	35	92	-57	18	
20	Barcsi SC	38	3	3	32	21	117	-96	9	

=== Norhteastern group ===
Pos	Teams	Pld	W	D	L	GF	GA	GD	Pts	Promotion or relegation
1	Kazincbarcikai Vegyész SE	36	25	6	5	100	38	62	56	Promotion to Nemzeti Bajnokság II
2	Debreceni MTE	36	22	9	5	89	38	51	53	
3	Honvéd Papp József SE	36	17	10	9	56	40	16	44	
4	Nyíregyházi Spartacus Petőfi	36	14	16	6	40	31	9	44	
5	Leninvárosi MTK	36	15	10	11	47	40	7	40	
6	Miskolci VSC	36	14	10	12	65	49	16	38	
7	Vasas Ikarus SK	36	12	14	10	44	33	11	38	
8	Gyöngyösi Spartacus	36	14	9	13	51	51	0	37	
9	Balassagyarmati SE	36	15	6	15	45	43	2	36	
10	Hajdúszoboszlói Bocskai	36	13	10	13	43	52	-9	36	
11	Salgótarjáni Kohász SE 1	36	12	11	13	44	52	-8	35	Relegation to Megyei Bajnokság I
12	Nagybátonyi Bányász SC	36	11	11	14	46	51	-5	33	Relegation to Megyei Bajnokság I
13	Borsodi Bányász	36	11	10	15	36	48	-12	32	
14	Záhonyi VSC	36	11	10	15	36	55	-19	32	Relegation to Megyei Bajnokság I
15	Rudabányai Ércbányász	36	10	10	16	42	51	-9	30	Relegation to Megyei Bajnokság I
16	Salgótarjáni Síküveggyár	36	12	5	19	55	69	-14	29	
17	Sátoraljaújhelyi Spartacus Medosz MÁV	36	10	6	20	36	68	-32	26	
18	Hatvani Kinizsi	36	7	11	18	29	57	-28	25	Relegation to Megyei Bajnokság I
19	Kisvárdai SE	36	7	6	23	35	73	-38	20	
20	Egri Vasas 2	0	0	0	0	0	0	0	0	Relegation to Megyei Bajnokság I

=== Southeastern group ===
Pos	Teams	Pld	W	D	L	GF	GA	GD	Pts	Promotion or relegation
1	Békéscsabai TASK	38	24	8	6	71	35	36	56	Promotion to Nemzeti Bajnokság II
2	Szegedi Dózsa	38	21	9	8	76	46	30	51	
3	Szarvasi Főiskola Spartacus SC	38	22	6	10	98	47	51	50	
4	Lehel SC	38	16	14	8	47	37	10	46	
5	ESMTK	38	17	11	10	86	67	19	45	
6	ÉGSZÖV MEDOSZ SE	38	15	14	9	64	38	26	44	
7	Gyulai SE	38	16	11	11	61	44	17	43	
8	Honvéd Szabó Lajos SE	38	17	9	12	41	34	7	43	
9	Kecskeméti SC	38	17	8	13	68	59	9	42	
10	Honvéd Bem József SE	38	18	5	15	59	49	10	41	
11	Jánoshalmi Spartacus	38	17	7	14	49	56	-7	41	Relegation to Megyei Bajnokság I
12	Kecskeméti TE	38	15	9	14	61	59	2	39	
13	Kiskunhalasi Medosz	38	10	14	14	55	67	-12	34	Relegation to Megyei Bajnokság I
14	Láng Vasas	38	10	9	19	43	72	-29	29	
15	Nagyszénási TSZ SK	38	10	9	19	40	72	-32	29	Relegation to Megyei Bajnokság I
16	ÉPGÉP	38	9	9	20	45	54	-9	27	Relegation to Megyei Bajnokság I
17	Szegedi VSE	38	10	7	21	41	74	-33	27	
18	Törökszentmiklósi Vasas SK	38	10	6	22	38	63	-25	26	Relegation to Megyei Bajnokság I
19	Ceglédi VSE	38	10	4	24	44	80	-36	24	
20	Szentesi Vízmű	38	8	7	23	42	76	-34	23	Relegation to Megyei Bajnokság I

== See also ==
- 1976–77 Magyar Kupa
- 1976–77 Nemzeti Bajnokság I
- 1976–77 Nemzeti Bajnokság II
