= 1973–74 Nemzeti Bajnokság III =

Nemzeti Bajnokság III
- Season: 1973–74
- Champions: Kaposvári Rákóczi SC (West); Ózdi Kohász SE (North); FŐSPED Szállítók SE (East)
- Promoted: Kaposvári Rákóczi SC (West); Ózdi Kohász SE (North); Budapesti VSC (North); FŐSPED Szállítók SE (East); Volán SC (East)

The 1973–74 Nemzeti Bajnokság III season was the 1st edition of the Nemzeti Bajnokság III.

== League tables ==
=== Western group ===
Pos	Teams	Pld	W	D	L	GF	GA	GD	Pts	Promotion or relegation
1	Kaposvári Rákóczi SC	30	20	4	6	72	28	44	44	Promotion to Nemzeti Bajnokság II
2	NIKE Fűzfői AK	30	19	5	6	74	39	35	43	Advance to play-offs
3	BKV Előre SC	30	13	9	8	49	36	13	35	
4	Pécsi VSK	30	11	13	6	35	27	8	35	
5	Soproni Textiles SE	30	12	10	8	43	30	13	34	
6	KOMÉP SC	30	13	6	11	49	35	14	32	
7	Honvéd Táncsics SE	30	10	10	10	40	35	5	30	
8	Dunaújvárosi Építők	30	12	6	12	35	41	-6	30	
9	Bakony Vegyész TC	30	10	9	11	35	36	-1	29	
10	Győri Dózsa SK	30	11	7	12	40	45	-5	29	
11	Székesfehérvári MÁV Előre SC	30	12	5	13	34	40	-6	29	
12	Sabaria Cipőgyár SE	30	9	10	11	31	37	-6	28	
13	Körmendi Főiskola MTE	30	10	4	16	33	50	-17	24	
14	Győri Elektromos	30	9	5	16	45	62	-17	23	
15	Máza-Szászvári Bányász	30	8	6	16	31	51	-20	22	
16	Szombathelyi SE Dózsa	30	4	5	21	36	90	-54	13	

=== Northern group ===
Pos	Teams	Pld	W	D	L	GF	GA	GD	Pts	Promotion or relegation
1	Ózdi Kohász SE	30	18	9	3	46	19	27	45	Promotion to Nemzeti Bajnokság II
2	Budapesti VSC	30	18	6	6	71	30	41	42	Advance to play-offs
3	Kazincbarcikai Vegyész SE	30	16	9	5	52	30	22	41	
4	Miskolci VSC	30	16	7	7	57	29	28	39	
5	Gyöngyösi Spartacus	30	14	8	8	48	27	21	36	
6	Vasas Izzó SC	30	15	6	9	49	30	19	36	
7	Rudabányai Ércbányász	30	15	5	10	56	45	11	35	
8	Dunakeszi VSE	30	13	4	13	40	41	-1	30	
9	Váci Híradás	30	9	11	10	29	41	-12	29	
10	Salgótarjáni Kohász SE	30	10	8	12	46	51	-5	28	
11	Nagybátonyi Bányász SC	30	9	7	14	31	43	-12	25	
12	Sátoraljaújhelyi Spartacus Medosz MÁV	30	7	8	15	27	57	-30	22	
13	Nyíregyházi Spartacus Petőfi	30	6	8	16	20	46	-26	20	
14	ÉPGÉP	30	8	3	19	27	51	-24	19	
15	Leninvárosi MTK	30	6	5	19	32	51	-19	17	
16	Kisterenyei Bányász Építők	30	6	4	20	18	58	-40	16	

=== Eastern group ===
Pos	Teams	Pld	W	D	L	GF	GA	GD	Pts	Promotion or relegation
1	FŐSPED Szállítók SE	30	24	3	3	86	29	57	51	Promotion to Nemzeti Bajnokság II
2	Volán SC	30	22	5	3	72	24	48	49	Advance to play-offs
3	Honvéd Szabó Lajos SE	30	14	9	7	41	28	13	37	
4	Szegedi Dózsa	30	15	6	9	46	36	10	36	
5	Debreceni EAC	30	14	5	11	59	53	6	33	
6	Szegedi VSE	30	9	12	9	37	34	3	30	
7	Békéscsabai VTSK	30	11	8	11	54	59	-5	30	Relegation to Megyei Bajnokság I
8	III. kerületi TTVE	30	10	7	13	53	51	2	27	
9	Ceglédi VSE	30	8	11	11	42	48	-6	27	
10	Budapesti Építők SC	30	9	9	12	53	65	-12	27	
11	Debreceni MTE	30	11	4	15	43	46	-3	26	
12	Láng Vasas SK	30	10	6	14	39	45	-6	26	
13	Hajdúböszörményi Bocskai	30	8	7	15	37	51	-14	23	
14	Kecskeméti TE	30	7	7	16	32	54	-22	21	
15	Szolnoki MÁV SE	30	7	6	17	35	68	-33	20	
16	Kiskunhalasi Medosz	30	5	7	18	34	72	-38	17	

== Promotion play-offs ==
II. csoport:

1. Volán SC 2 2 – – 5-2 4

2. Budapesti Vasutas SC 2 1 – 1 3-3 2

------------------------------------------------------------------

3. NIKE Fűzfői AK 2 – – 2 2-5 –

== See also ==
- 1973–74 Magyar Kupa
- 1973–74 Nemzeti Bajnokság I
- 1973–74 Nemzeti Bajnokság II
