= 1963 Nemzeti Bajnokság II =

Nemzeti Bajnokság II
- Season: 1963
- Champions: VM Egyetértés
- Promoted: None
- Relegated: None

The 1963 Nemzeti Bajnokság II was the 65th season of the Nemzeti Bajnokság II, the second tier of the Hungarian football league.

== League table ==
Pos	Team	Pld	W	D	L	GF	GA	GD	Pts
1	VM Egyetértés	15	10	3	2	18	7	+11	23
2	Oroszlányi Bányász SK	15	6	7	2	22	11	+11	19
3	Győri MÁV DAC	15	7	5	3	23	13	+10	19
4	Dunaújvárosi Kohász SE	15	6	7	2	28	21	+7	19
5	Szombathelyi Haladás	15	7	4	4	23	17	+6	18
6	Salgótarjáni BTC	15	4	9	2	18	10	+8	17
7	Borsodi Bányász SE	15	4	7	4	18	16	+2	15
8	FŐSPED Szállítók SE	15	6	3	6	18	17	+1	15
9	Nyíregyházi Spartacus	15	6	3	6	13	23	−10	15
10	BVSC	15	5	4	6	19	22	−3	14
11	Székesfehérvári VT Vasas	15	4	5	6	26	28	−2	13
12	Budafoki MTE	15	3	6	6	14	20	−6	12
13	Miskolci Vasutas SC	15	3	6	6	14	23	−9	12
14	Ózdi Kohász SE	15	4	2	9	23	32	−9	10
15	Ganz-MÁVAG SE	15	3	4	8	17	24	−7	10
16	Láng Vasas SK	15	3	3	9	10	20	−10	9

== See also ==
- 1963 Magyar Kupa
- 1963 Nemzeti Bajnokság I
