= 1976–77 Nemzeti Bajnokság II =

Nemzeti Bajnokság II
- Season: 1976–77
- Champions: Pécsi MFC
- Promoted: Pécsi MFC (winners); Székesfehérvári MÁV Előre SC (runners-up)
- Relegated: Ózdi Kohász SE; Ganz-MÁVAG SE; Oroszlányi Bányász SK; Szolnoki MÁV FC

The 1976–77 Nemzeti Bajnokság II was the 79th season of the Nemzeti Bajnokság II, the second tier of the Hungarian football league.

== League table ==
Pos	Team	Pld	W	D	L	GF	GA	GD	Pts	Promotion or relegation
1	Pécsi Munkás SC (Note: Due to match fixing, neither Pécs nor Vasas collected points after the match against each other.)	38	24	10	4	86	29	+57	58	Promotion to Nemzeti Bajnokság I
2	Székesfehérvári MÁV Előre SC	38	21	8	9	70	54	+16	50	Promotion to Nemzeti Bajnokság I
3	Budafoki MTE Kinizsi	38	19	9	10	85	61	+24	47	
4	Szolnoki MTE	38	20	6	12	75	57	+18	46	
5	Volán SC	38	17	10	11	67	41	+26	44	
6	BVSC	38	16	12	10	65	55	+10	44	
7	Vasas Izzó SC	38	17	8	13	64	44	+20	42	
8	Debreceni Vasutas SC	38	15	12	11	50	39	+11	42	
9	Eger SE (Note: Started as Egri Dózsa and merged during the season with Egri Vasas and Egri Kinizsi.)	38	16	8	14	63	66	−3	40	
10	Nagykanizsai Olajbányász	38	14	10	14	56	60	−4	38	
11	Szekszárdi Dózsa SE	38	12	12	14	43	53	−10	36	
12	Komlói Bányász SK	38	13	8	17	44	51	−7	34	
13	Kossuth KFSE	38	13	7	18	52	57	−5	33	
14	Várpalotai Bányász SK	38	10	13	15	46	54	−8	33	
15	MÁV DAC	38	14	5	19	52	70	−18	33	
16	NIKE Fűzfői AK	38	10	12	16	46	64	−18	32	
17	Ózdi Kohász	38	12	6	20	50	63	−13	30	Relegation to Nemzeti Bajnokság III
18	Ganz-Mávag	38	9	12	17	50	66	−16	30	Relegation to Nemzeti Bajnokság III
19	Oroszlányi Bányász SK	38	7	10	21	49	98	−49	24	Relegation to Nemzeti Bajnokság III
20	Szolnoki MÁV	38	7	8	23	30	61	−31	22	Relegation to Nemzeti Bajnokság III

== See also ==
- 1976–77 Magyar Kupa
- 1976–77 Nemzeti Bajnokság I
