= 1985–86 Nemzeti Bajnokság III =

Nemzeti Bajnokság III
- Season: 1985–86
- Champions: MÁV DAC (Bakony); Kaposvári Rákóczi SC (Dráva); Budafoki MTE (Duna); Szarvasi Vasas (Kőrös); Ózdi Kohász SE (Mátra); Debreceni Universitas SE (Tisza)
- Promoted: Kaposvári Rákóczi SC (Dráva); Budafoki MTE (Duna); Szarvasi Vasas (Kőrös); Ózdi Kohász SE (Mátra)

The 1985–86 Nemzeti Bajnokság III season was the 4th edition of the Nemzeti Bajnokság III.

== League tables ==
=== Bakony group ===
Pos	Teams	Pld	W	D	L	GF	GA	GD	Pts	Promotion or relegation
1	MÁV DAC	34	20	10	4	62	29	33	50	Advance to play-offs
2	Péti MTE	34	20	8	6	60	25	35	48	
3	Ajkai Bányász	34	17	10	7	70	31	39	44	
4	Ajkai Alumínium SK	34	18	8	8	62	35	27	44	
5	Sárvári Kinizsi	34	17	7	10	62	45	17	41	
6	Tapolcai Bauxitbányász SE	34	16	8	10	47	40	7	40	
7	MOTIM TE	34	15	7	12	37	30	7	37	
8	Sabaria SE	34	11	12	11	49	40	9	34	
9	Várpalotai Bányász SK	34	11	11	12	43	32	11	33	
10	MÁV Nagykanizsai TE	34	11	11	12	34	36	-2	33	
11	Szentgotthárdi MSE	34	12	9	13	44	62	-18	33	
12	Honvéd Katona József SE	34	10	11	13	30	41	-11	31	
13	Répcelaki Bányász SE	34	9	13	12	34	46	-12	31	
14	Soproni Postás SK	34	12	7	15	36	49	-13	31	
15	Kapuvári SE	34	8	14	12	37	53	-16	30	
16	Bábolnai SE	34	9	6	19	39	58	-19	24	Relegation to Megyei Bajnokság I
17	NIKE Fűzfői AK	34	6	5	23	27	66	-39	17	Relegation to Megyei Bajnokság I
18	Győrszentiván SE	34	3	5	26	20	75	-55	11	Relegation to Megyei Bajnokság I

=== Dráva group ===
Pos	Teams	Pld	W	D	L	GF	GA	GD	Pts	Promotion or relegation
1	Kaposvári Rákóczi SC	30	22	4	4	80	23	57	48	Advance to play-offs
2	Mohácsi TSZ SE	30	20	5	5	58	20	38	45	
3	Pécsi VSK	30	18	5	7	71	25	46	41	
4	Siklósi Tenkes SE	30	11	12	7	39	30	9	34	
5	Bonyhádi MSC	30	14	5	11	37	47	-10	33	
6	Paksi SE	30	10	9	11	34	41	-7	29	
7	Mázaszászvári Bányász	30	10	8	12	44	41	3	28	
8	Honvéd Táncsics SE	30	10	8	12	35	36	-1	28	
9	Bólyi MEDOSZ SE	30	11	6	13	28	44	-16	28	
10	Dombóvári VMSE	30	8	11	11	50	51	-1	27	
11	Szigetvári VSz SE	30	7	13	10	29	40	-11	27	
12	Nagyatádi VSE	30	9	8	13	37	48	-11	26	
13	Kisdorogi MEDOSZ SE	30	8	9	13	22	38	-16	25	
14	Nagykanizsai Volán Dózsa	30	8	8	14	34	42	-8	24	Relegation to Megyei Bajnokság I
15	Boglárlellei SE	30	8	6	16	25	57	-32	22	Relegation to Megyei Bajnokság I
16	Somberek	30	4	7	19	18	58	-40	15	Relegation to Megyei Bajnokság I

=== Duna group ===
Pos	Teams	Pld	W	D	L	GF	GA	GD	Pts	Promotion or relegation
1	Budafoki MTE	34	23	9	2	77	22	55	55	Advance to play-offs
2	Építők SC	34	16	15	3	71	31	40	47	
3	Dorogi Bányász SC	34	18	10	6	48	25	23	46	
4	Esztergomi Vasas	34	19	6	9	74	44	30	44	
5	III. Kerületi TTVE	34	16	9	9	75	49	26	41	
6	Oroszlányi Bányász SK	34	13	14	7	52	31	21	40	
7	BKV Előre SC	34	12	13	9	48	37	11	37	
8	Vasas Ikarus SK	34	13	11	10	57	51	6	37	
9	Érdi VSE	34	13	8	13	63	47	16	34	
10	Dömsödi Dózsa TSZ SE	34	11	12	11	50	47	3	34	
11	Ráckevei Aranykalász TSZ SK	34	11	10	13	49	47	2	32	
12	ESMTK	34	12	8	14	46	71	-25	32	
13	Pénzügyőr SE	34	10	11	13	35	38	-3	31	
14	Nyergesújfalui Viscosa SE	34	8	15	11	47	58	-11	31	
15	Dunai Kőolaj SK	34	10	8	16	35	56	-21	28	
16	Ácsi Kinizsi	34	7	5	22	37	83	-46	19	
17	Honvéd Toldi SE	34	3	11	20	27	77	-50	17	Relegation to Megyei Bajnokság I
18	Rákosmenti TK	34	1	5	28	26	103	-77	7	Relegation to Megyei Bajnokság I

=== Kőrös group ===
Pos	Teams	Pld	W	D	L	GF	GA	GD	Pts	Promotion or relegation
1	Szarvasi Vasas	30	23	5	2	68	18	50	51	Advance to play-offs
2	Kecskeméti SC	30	18	8	4	56	25	31	44	
3	Orosházi MTK	30	15	9	6	45	18	27	39	
4	Gyulai TE	30	15	5	10	46	39	7	35	
5	Békési SE	30	11	10	9	53	46	7	32	
6	Kecskeméti TE	30	10	9	11	48	45	3	29	
7	Miskei TSZ SK	30	9	11	10	38	37	1	29	
8	Szentesi Vízmű SK	30	11	6	13	32	54	-22	28	
9	Lajosmizse	30	10	7	13	47	57	-10	27	
10	Makói SVSE	30	10	7	13	40	53	-13	27	
11	Szegedi VSE	30	10	6	14	36	51	-15	26	
12	Honvéd Kun Béla SE	30	8	9	13	49	51	-2	25	
13	Soltvadkerti TE	30	10	5	15	53	58	-5	25	
14	Szegedi Dózsa SC	30	8	8	14	35	47	-12	24	Relegation to Megyei Bajnokság I
15	Tápéi TSZ SK	30	7	6	17	26	46	-20	20	Relegation to Megyei Bajnokság I
16	Határőr Dózsa SE	30	8	3	19	35	62	-27	19	Relegation to Megyei Bajnokság I

=== Mátra group ===
Pos	Teams	Pld	W	D	L	GF	GA	GD	Pts	Promotion or relegation
1	Ózdi Kohász SE	32	24	6	2	86	23	63	54	Advance to play-offs
2	Budapesti VSC	32	18	5	9	57	36	21	41	
3	Honvéd Köteles Jenő SE	32	14	11	7	54	30	24	39	
4	Sajóbábonyi Vegyész SE	32	15	8	9	47	36	11	38	
5	Salgótarjáni Síküveggyár	32	14	9	9	50	42	8	37	
6	Gyöngyösi SE	32	14	8	10	45	34	11	36	
7	Hatvani KVSC	32	12	9	11	53	48	5	33	
8	Recski Ércbányász	32	12	9	11	52	49	3	33	
9	Nagybátonyi Bányász SC	32	13	7	12	36	37	-1	33	
10	Edelényi Bányász	32	11	9	12	40	43	-3	31	
11	Borsodi Bányász SE	32	10	10	12	34	36	-2	30	
12	Bélapátfalvai Építők	32	8	14	10	37	42	-5	30	
13	Romhányi Kerámia SE	32	10	10	12	43	51	-8	30	
14	Siroki Vasas	32	8	6	18	28	56	-28	22	Relegation to Megyei Bajnokság I
15	Balassagyarmati SE	32	7	7	18	25	55	-30	21	Relegation to Megyei Bajnokság I
16	Gödi SE	32	6	8	18	42	60	-18	20	Relegation to Megyei Bajnokság I
17	Borsodnádasd	32	5	6	21	35	86	-51	16	Relegation to Megyei Bajnokság I

=== Tisza group ===
Pos	Teams	Pld	W	D	L	GF	GA	GD	Pts	Promotion or relegation
1	Debreceni Universitas SE	30	20	8	2	76	24	52	48	Advance to play-offs
2	Olefin SC	30	16	8	6	46	26	20	40	
3	Balmazújvárosi Lenin TSz SE	30	15	8	7	60	35	25	38	
4	Hajdúböszörményi Bocskai SE	30	13	12	5	51	32	19	38	
5	Rakamazi Spartacus SE	30	14	9	7	57	36	21	37	
6	Volán-Rákóczi SE	30	13	8	9	42	32	10	34	
7	Jászberényi Lehel SC	30	13	7	10	47	32	15	33	
8	Honvéd Papp József SE	30	12	9	9	44	33	11	33	
9	Mátészalkai MTK	30	11	8	11	42	49	-7	30	
10	Karcagi SE	30	11	6	13	37	44	-7	28	
11	Hajdúszoboszlói Bocskai-Vasas SE	30	7	12	11	39	43	-4	26	
12	Püspökladányi MÁV Egyetértés SE	30	9	8	13	36	50	-14	26	
13	Honvéd Asztalos János SE	30	8	7	15	31	45	-14	23	
14	Kisvárdai SE	30	8	5	17	37	50	-13	20	Relegation to Megyei Bajnokság I
15	Tiszavasvári Lombik SE	30	6	8	16	25	50	-25	20	Relegation to Megyei Bajnokság I
16	Szolnoki Vegyiművek SE	30	1	3	26	16	105	-89	5	Relegation to Megyei Bajnokság I

== Promotion play-offs ==
Group 1
		Pld	W	D	L	GA	GF	Pts	Promotion
1	Budafoki MTE	4	2	1	1	7	6	5	Promotion to Nemzeti Bajnokság II
2	Kaposvári Rákóczi SC	4	1	2	1	7	6	4	Promotion to Nemzeti Bajnokság II
3	MÁV DAC	4	0	3	1	5	7	3	

Group 2
		Pld	W	D	L	GA	GF	Pts	Promotion
1	Ózdi Kohász SE	4	2	1	1	7	5	5	Promotion to Nemzeti Bajnokság II
2	Szarvasi Vasas	4	2	0	2	5	5	4	Promotion to Nemzeti Bajnokság II
3	Debreceni USE	4	1	1	2	3	5	3	

== See also ==
- 1985–86 Magyar Kupa
- 1985–86 Nemzeti Bajnokság I
- 1985–86 Nemzeti Bajnokság II
