= 1984–85 Nemzeti Bajnokság III =

Nemzeti Bajnokság III
- Season: 1984–85
- Champions: MOTIM TE (Bakony); Komlói Bányász SK (Dráva); Oroszlányi Bányász SK (Duna); Délép SC Szeged (Kőrös); Ganz-MÁVAG SE (Mátra); Honvéd Szabó Lajos SE (Tisza)
- Promoted: Komlói Bányász SK (Dráva); Ganz-MÁVAG SE (Mátra); Honvéd Szabó Lajos SE (Tisza)

The 1984–85 Nemzeti Bajnokság III season was the 4th edition of the Nemzeti Bajnokság III.

== League tables ==
=== Bakony group ===
Pos	Teams	Pld	W	D	L	GF	GA	GD	Pts	Promotion or relegation
1	MOTIM TE	34	22	10	2	74	21	53	54	Advance to play-offs
2	Sabaria SE	34	24	5	5	73	21	52	53	
3	Péti MTE	34	20	11	3	59	22	37	51	
4	Ajkai Bányász SK	34	19	7	8	46	23	23	45	
5	Győri MÁV DAC	34	18	8	8	75	36	39	44	
6	Sárvári Kinizsi SE	34	17	9	8	57	41	16	43	
7	Nagykanizsai Volán Dózsa	34	14	8	12	38	41	-3	36	
8	Ajkai Aluminium SK	34	12	10	12	32	41	-9	34	
9	NIKE Fűzfői AK	34	9	13	12	45	48	-3	31	
10	Soproni Postás Sportkör	34	8	15	11	42	45	-3	31	
11	Honvéd Katona József SE	34	8	13	13	42	55	-13	29	
12	Kapuvári SE	34	11	7	16	31	48	-17	29	
13	Bábolnai SE	34	9	9	16	41	48	-7	27	
14	Szentgotthárdi MSE	34	9	9	16	35	47	-12	27	
15	Zirc-Dudari Bányász	34	8	9	17	23	51	-28	25	Relegation to Megyei Bajnokság I
16	Pápai Vasas SE	34	6	9	19	28	65	-37	21	Relegation to Megyei Bajnokság I
17	Győri Dózsa SK	34	6	6	22	36	75	-39	18	Relegation to Megyei Bajnokság I
18	Győri Elektromos	34	5	4	25	28	77	-49	14	Relegation to Megyei Bajnokság I

=== Dráva group ===
Pos	Teams	Pld	W	D	L	GF	GA	GD	Pts	Promotion or relegation
1	Komlói Bányász SK	30	19	9	2	78	26	52	47	Advance to play-offs
2	Kaposvári Rákóczi SC	30	21	2	7	82	37	45	44	
3	Mohácsi TE	30	13	13	4	50	29	21	39	
4	Mázaszászvári Bányász	30	12	10	8	51	36	15	34	
5	Bonyhádi MSC	30	11	11	8	42	31	11	33	
6	Siklósi Tenkes SE	30	14	4	12	40	59	-19	32	
7	Paksi SE	30	13	5	12	48	43	5	31	
8	Pécsi VSK	30	11	9	10	39	33	6	31	
9	Szigetvári VSZ SE	30	11	7	12	51	58	-7	29	
10	Honvéd Táncsics SE	30	11	7	12	41	38	3	29	
11	Kisdorogi SE	30	12	4	14	37	46	-9	28	
12	Bólyi MEDOSZ	30	11	5	14	49	47	2	27	
13	Nagyatádi Városi SE	30	8	9	13	44	53	-9	25	
14	Sellyei SK	30	8	4	18	26	64	-38	20	Relegation to Megyei Bajnokság I
15	Csurgói Spartacus	30	5	8	17	39	70	-31	18	Relegation to Megyei Bajnokság I
16	Újpetrei SE	30	5	3	22	31	78	-47	13	Relegation to Megyei Bajnokság I

=== Duna group ===
Pos	Teams	Pld	W	D	L	GF	GA	GD	Pts	Promotion or relegation
1	Oroszlányi Bányász SK	34	20	12	2	80	24	56	52	Advance to play-offs
2	Építők SC	34	21	10	3	74	29	45	52	
3	Dömsödi Dózsa TSz SK	34	19	12	3	57	30	27	50	
4	Budafoki MTE Kinizsi SE	34	17	10	7	61	36	25	44	
5	Vasas Ikarus SK	34	16	8	10	52	40	12	40	
6	Esztergomi Vasas	34	12	14	8	59	44	15	38	
7	Nyergesújfalusi Viscosa	34	13	11	10	48	40	8	37	
8	Pénzügyőr SE	34	15	7	12	47	46	1	37	
9	Dorogi AC	34	15	7	12	47	40	7	37	
10	Érdi VSE	34	15	7	12	65	55	10	37	
11	Gödi Dunamenti TSz SK	34	8	14	12	36	39	-3	30	
12	Budapesti VSC	34	11	8	15	39	49	-10	30	
13	Ráckevei TSz SK	34	10	9	15	39	58	-19	29	
14	III. Kerületi TTVE	34	8	12	14	42	50	-8	28	
15	Honvéd Rákóczi SE	34	7	14	13	37	47	-10	28	Relegation to Megyei Bajnokság I
16	Kossuth KFSE	34	9	8	17	35	58	-23	26	Relegation to Megyei Bajnokság I
17	Honvéd Bem József SE	34	2	11	21	22	55	-33	15	Relegation to Megyei Bajnokság I
18	Honvéd Szondi SE	34	0	2	32	20	120	-100	2	Relegation to Megyei Bajnokság I

=== Kőrös group ===
Pos	Teams	Pld	W	D	L	GF	GA	GD	Pts	Promotion or relegation
1	Délép SC Szeged	30	19	6	5	61	24	37	44	Advance to play-offs
2	Kecskeméti TE	30	19	4	7	71	48	23	42	
3	Miskei TSZ SK	30	15	7	8	54	38	16	37	
4	Kecskeméti SC	30	14	8	8	51	30	21	36	
5	Szarvasi Főiskola Spartacus SC	30	10	13	7	29	20	9	33	
6	Szegedi Dózsa SC	30	12	9	9	51	39	12	33	
7	Békési SE	30	10	11	9	50	41	9	31	
8	Honvéd Kun Béla SE	30	12	6	12	43	50	-7	30	
9	Lajosmizsei SE	30	10	9	11	38	35	3	29	
10	Gyulai SE	30	9	11	10	45	50	-5	29	
11	Makói Spartacus-Vasas SE	30	8	11	11	44	51	-7	27	
12	Orosházi MTK	30	9	9	12	29	30	-1	27	
13	Szegedi VSE	30	9	8	13	36	55	-19	26	
14	Nagyszénási SE	30	9	6	15	33	53	-20	24	Relegation to Megyei Bajnokság I
15	Tisza Cipő SE	30	7	9	14	35	56	-21	23	
16	Békéscsabai Agyagipar	30	3	3	24	20	70	-50	9	

=== Mátra group ===
Pos	Teams	Pld	W	D	L	GF	GA	GD	Pts	Promotion or relegation
1	Ganz-MÁVAG SE	30	20	5	5	76	24	52	45	Advance to play-offs
2	Hatvani KVSC	30	16	6	8	57	29	28	38	
3	Gyöngyösi SE	30	13	10	7	50	30	20	36	
4	BKV Előre SC	30	12	10	8	43	37	6	34	
5	Nagybátonyi Bányász SC	30	12	10	8	34	27	7	34	
6	Honvéd Papp József SE	30	13	5	12	38	36	2	31	
7	Salgótarjáni Síküveg	30	10	11	9	40	41	-1	41	
8	Sajóbábony	30	11	8	11	33	32	1	31	
9	Recski Ércbányász	30	10	9	11	31	37	-6	29	
10	Edelényi Bányász	30	9	10	11	39	61	-22	28	
11	Romhányi Kerámia	30	10	6	14	41	65	-24	26	
12	Bélapátfalvai Építők	30	5	15	10	25	40	-15	25	
13	Borsodnádasd	30	9	6	15	39	44	-5	24	
14	Borsodi Építők Volán	30	6	12	12	26	38	-12	24	Relegation to Megyei Bajnokság I
15	Füzesabony	30	8	7	15	32	41	-9	23	Relegation to Megyei Bajnokság I
16	Miskolci VSC	30	7	8	15	28	50	-22	22	Relegation to Megyei Bajnokság I

=== Tisza group ===
Pos	Teams	Pld	W	D	L	GF	GA	GD	Pts	Promotion or relegation
1	Honvéd Szabó Lajos SE	30	20	7	3	51	9	42	47	Advance to play-offs
2	Debreceni Universitas SE	30	20	6	4	63	23	40	46	
3	Olefin SC	30	15	10	5	40	21	19	40	
4	Jászberényi Lehel SC	30	14	11	5	55	29	26	39	
5	Hajdúböszörményi Bocskai SE	30	13	9	8	46	32	14	35	
6	Balmazújvárosi Lenin TSz SE	30	13	8	9	52	41	11	34	
7	Volán-Rákóczi SE	30	12	9	9	41	37	4	33	
8	Honvéd Asztalos János SE	30	10	10	10	36	33	3	30	
9	Püspökladányi MÁV Egyetértés SE	30	12	6	12	48	45	3	30	
10	Karcagi SE	30	12	4	14	50	52	-2	28	
11	Rakamazi Spartacus SE	30	10	5	15	40	44	-4	25	
12	Kisvárdai SE	30	8	9	13	39	58	-19	25	
13	Mátészalkai MTK	30	9	5	16	31	49	-18	23	
14	Hajdú Vasas SE	30	5	10	15	36	55	-19	20	
15	Baktalórántházi TSz SE	30	5	6	19	24	69	-45	16	
16	Jászkiséri TSz SE	30	3	3	24	13	68	-55	9	Relegation to Megyei Bajnokság I

== Promotion play-offs ==
Playoff 1
Home	Result	Away
Komlói Bányász SK	1–0 (1–0)	Sabaria SE
Sabaria SE	1–1 (0–1)	Komlói Bányász SK

Playoff 1
Home	Result	Away
Honvéd Szabó Lajos SE	2–0 (1–0)	Oroszlányi Bányász SK
Oroszlányi Bányász SK	2–1 (1–0)	Honvéd Szabó Lajos SE

Playoff 1
Home	Result	Away
Ganz-MÁVAG SE	0–0	Délép SC
Délép SC	1–3 (1–1)	Ganz-MÁVAG SE

== See also ==
- 1984–85 Magyar Kupa
- 1984–85 Nemzeti Bajnokság I
- 1984–85 Nemzeti Bajnokság II
