= 1977–78 Nemzeti Bajnokság II =

Nemzeti Bajnokság II
- Season: 1977–78
- Champions: Salgótarjáni BTC
- Promoted: Salgótarjáni BTC; Budapesti Vasas Izzó
- Relegated: Várpalotai Bányász SK

The 1977–78 Nemzeti Bajnokság II was the 80th season of the Nemzeti Bajnokság II, the second tier of the Hungarian football league.

== League table ==
Pos	Team	Pld	W	D	L	GF	GA	GD	Pts	Promotion or relegation
1	Salgótarjáni TC	38	23	10	5	75	33	+42	56	Promotion to Nemzeti Bajnokság I
2	Budapesti Vasas Izzó	38	22	10	6	63	26	+37	54	Promotion to Nemzeti Bajnokság I
3	Debreceni Vasutas SC	38	23	7	8	51	36	+15	53	
4	Kazincbarcikai VSE	38	20	9	9	66	35	+31	49	
5	Eger SE	38	16	14	8	55	39	+16	46	
6	Szolnoki MTE	38	17	9	12	59	41	+18	43	
7	Volán SC	38	12	16	10	55	50	+5	40	
8	Budafoki MTE Kinizsi	38	14	11	13	64	48	+16	39	
9	Nagykanizsai Olajbányász SE	38	14	9	15	49	48	+1	37	
10	Váci Híradás Vasas	38	14	9	15	39	42	−3	37	
11	Békéscsabai TASK	38	12	12	14	38	42	−4	36	
12	Dorogi AC	38	13	10	15	37	44	−7	36	
13	Komlói Bányász SK	38	13	8	17	39	46	−7	34	
14	BVSC	38	10	13	15	50	57	−7	33	
15	NIKE Fűzfői AK	38	11	11	16	46	68	−22	33	
16	BKV Előre SC	38	9	13	16	34	48	−14	31	
17	Kossuth Katonai FSE	38	6	18	14	50	67	−17	30	
18	Szekszárdi Dózsa SC	38	9	9	20	38	73	−35	27	
19	Várpalotai Bányász SK	38	7	10	21	44	73	−29	24	Relegation to Nemzeti Bajnokság III
20	MÁV DAC	38	7	8	23	41	77	−36	22	

== Relegation play-offs ==
=== Round 1 ===
- MÁV Dunántúli AC bye
- Várpalotai Bányász bye

=== Round 2 ===
	First match	Second match	
MÁV Dunántúli AC	2–0 (2–0)	2–0 (1–0)	Keszthelyi Haladás
Vasas Ikarus	4–0 (2–0)	0–3 (0–2)	Várpalotai Bányász SK

== See also ==
- 1977–78 Magyar Kupa
- 1977–78 Nemzeti Bajnokság I
