= 1963 Nemzeti Bajnokság III =

Nemzeti Bajnokság III
- Season: 1963
- Champions: III. Kerületi TTVE (West); Egri Dózsa SC (East)
- Promoted: No promotion

The 1963 Nemzeti Bajnokság III season was the 13th edition of the Nemzeti Bajnokság III.

== League tables ==
=== Western group ===
Pos	Teams	Pld	W	D	L	GF	GA	GD	Pts	Promotion or relegation
1	III. Kerületi TTVE	17	13	1	3	41	17	24	27	No promotion or relegation
2	Pécsi BTC	17	10	3	4	40	17	23	23	No promotion or relegation
3	Pécsi VSK	17	10	2	5	34	19	15	22	No promotion or relegation
4	Pécsi Bányász SC	17	8	6	3	33	29	4	22	No promotion or relegation
5	Kaposvári Honvéd SE	17	8	4	5	26	18	8	20	No promotion or relegation
6	Erzsébeti VTK	17	7	6	4	33	30	3	20	No promotion or relegation
7	Budai Spartacus SC	17	8	3	6	33	24	9	19	No promotion or relegation
8	Pápai Textiles SE	17	9	0	8	20	16	4	18	No promotion or relegation
9	Esztergomi Vasas	17	7	4	6	29	26	3	18	No promotion or relegation
10	Székesfehérvári MÁV Előre SC	17	8	2	7	26	28	-2	18	No promotion or relegation
11	Győri Dózsa SE	17	6	3	8	26	25	1	15	No promotion or relegation
12	Vörös Csillag Traktorgyár	17	5	4	8	21	29	-8	14	No promotion or relegation
13	Kőbányai Lombik TK	17	6	1	10	25	32	-7	13	No promotion or relegation
14	Zalaegerszegi Dózsa	17	3	7	7	14	24	-10	13	No promotion or relegation
15	Zalaegerszegi TE	17	5	2	10	26	37	-11	12	No promotion or relegation
16	Mosonmagyaróvári TE	17	4	4	9	12	29	-17	12	No promotion or relegation
17	Veszprémi Haladás-Petőfi	17	4	3	10	17	36	-19	11	No promotion or relegation
18	Fővárosi Autóbusz SK	17	1	7	9	13	33	-20	9	No promotion or relegation

=== Eastern group ===
Pos	Teams	Pld	W	D	L	GF	GA	GD	Pts	Promotion or relegation
1	Egri Dózsa SC	17	12	3	2	39	15	24	27	No promotion or relegation
2	Kecskeméti Dózsa	17	11	4	2	39	12	27	26	No promotion or relegation
3	Szegedi VSE	17	10	3	4	32	19	13	23	No promotion or relegation
4	Nyíregyházi MSE	17	9	3	5	34	31	3	21	No promotion or relegation
5	Szolnoki MTE	17	8	4	5	37	26	11	20	No promotion or relegation
6	Budapesti Spartacus SC	17	7	5	5	28	28	0	19	No promotion or relegation
7	Jászberényi Lehel SC	17	8	2	7	29	26	3	18	No promotion or relegation
8	Gyulai MEDOSZ	17	7	4	6	35	30	5	18	No promotion or relegation
9	Kisterenyei Bányász	17	7	4	6	27	26	1	18	No promotion or relegation
10	Nagybátonyi Bányász SC	17	6	4	7	20	18	2	16	No promotion or relegation
11	Miskolci Bányász	17	6	4	7	25	36	-11	16	No promotion or relegation
12	KISTEXT SK	17	4	7	6	22	20	2	15	No promotion or relegation
13	Vasas Izzó SK	17	5	5	7	25	28	-3	15	No promotion or relegation
14	Budapesti Előre SC	17	6	2	9	23	22	1	14	No promotion or relegation
15	Szolnoki MÁV SE	17	3	6	8	32	35	-3	12	No promotion or relegation
16	Debreceni Dózsa	17	4	4	9	22	43	-21	12	No promotion or relegation
17	Baglyasaljai Bányász	17	4	2	11	20	48	-28	10	No promotion or relegation
18	Békéscsabai Előre	17	1	4	12	15	41	-26	6	No promotion or relegation

== See also ==
- 1963 Magyar Kupa
- 1963 Nemzeti Bajnokság I
- 1963 Nemzeti Bajnokság II
