= 1963 Nemzeti Bajnokság I =

Nemzeti Bajnokság I
- Season: 1963
- Country: Hungary
- Teams: 14
- Champions: Győri Vasas ETO
- Runner up: Budapest Honvéd SE
- Relegated: None
- Top goalscorer: Lajos Tichy
- All statistics correct as of 16 August 2026.

The 1963 season was the 61st completed season of Nemzeti Bajnokság I. Nemzeti Bajnokság I was divided into NBI and NBI/B, the latter functioned as the second division.

== Overview ==
It was contested by 14 teams and Győri Vasas ETO won the first division.

== League standings ==
Pos	Team	Pld	W	D	L	GF	GA	GR	Pts
1	Győri Vasas ETO	13	6	5	2	20	7	2.857	17
2	Budapest Honvéd SE	13	7	3	3	30	12	2.500	17
3	Ferencvárosi TC	13	7	3	3	15	9	1.667	17
4	Komlói Bányász SK	13	6	4	3	16	16	1.000	16
5	Vasas SC	13	6	2	5	19	16	1.188	14
6	Újpesti Dózsa SC	13	6	2	5	20	19	1.053	14
7	MTK	13	4	6	3	16	16	1.000	14
8	Csepel SC	13	6	1	6	17	19	0.895	13
9	Tatabányai Bányász SC	13	5	3	5	12	14	0.857	13
10	Dorogi Bányász SC	13	5	3	5	15	22	0.682	13
11	Diósgyőri VTK	13	4	3	6	12	19	0.632	11
12	Szegedi EAC	13	4	3	6	9	15	0.600	11
13	Pécsi Dózsa SC	13	3	0	10	21	31	0.677	6
14	Debreceni VSC	13	2	2	9	15	31	0.484	6

Source: rsssf.com

== Results ==
Home \ Away	CSE	DEB	DIÓ	DOR	FTC	GYŐ	HON	KOM	MTK	PÉC	SZE	TAT	ÚJP	VAS
Csepel		2–1		3–0					2–1	3–2	0–1		3–1	
Debrecen			1–1	1–1	1–5				1–2		1–0	3–2		1–2
Diósgyőr	2–1					1–0	1–1	0–1		1–4				3–2
Dorogi Bányász			1–0		2–1	0–0			1–1		1–0	2–0		1–0
Ferencváros	4–0		3–0				2–7		0–0	5–1		1–1	1–0	
Győr	2–0	4–0			2–4		2–0	3–1		3–1			0–0	
Budapest Honvéd	1–1	3–0		5–1						3–1	4–0		2–1	
Komlói Bányász	0–2	3–2		3–1	0–4		0–0			3–1			1–0	
MTK Budapest			0–0			0–0	0–4	1–1				4–0		2–1
Pécsi Dózsa		2–1		6–3					2–3		1–2	0–1	0–1	
Szegedi EAC			0–2		2–1	0–0		2–2	2–0			0–0		0–1
Tatabányai Bányász	1–0		2–0			0–0	1–0	0–1						2–0
Újpesti Dózsa		4–2	3–1	2–1					2–2		2–0	3–2		
Vasas	3–0				2–2	0–4	2–0	0–0		2–0			4–1	

Source: rsssf.com
Legend: Blue = home team win; Yellow = draw; Red = away team win.

=== Statistics ===
==== Top goalscorers ====
Rank	Scorer	Club	Goals
1	(Hungary) Lajos Tichy	Budapest Honvéd	13
2	(Hungary) Flórián Albert	Ferencvárosi TC	11
3	(Hungary) Antal Dunai	Pécsi Dózsa	7
4	(Hungary) Ferenc Bene	Újpesti Dózsa SC	6
4	(Hungary) László Kalmár	Csepel SC	6
4	(Hungary) Imre Komora	Budapest Honvéd	6
4	(Hungary) Mihály Laczkó	MTK Budapest	6
4	(Hungary) György Lutz	Komlói Bányász	6
4	(Hungary) Ferenc Machos	Vasas SC	6
4	(Hungary) György Vári	Pécsi Dózsa	6

== See also ==
- 1963 Nemzeti Bajnokság II
- 1963 Nemzeti Bajnokság III
