= Wittmann Antal park =

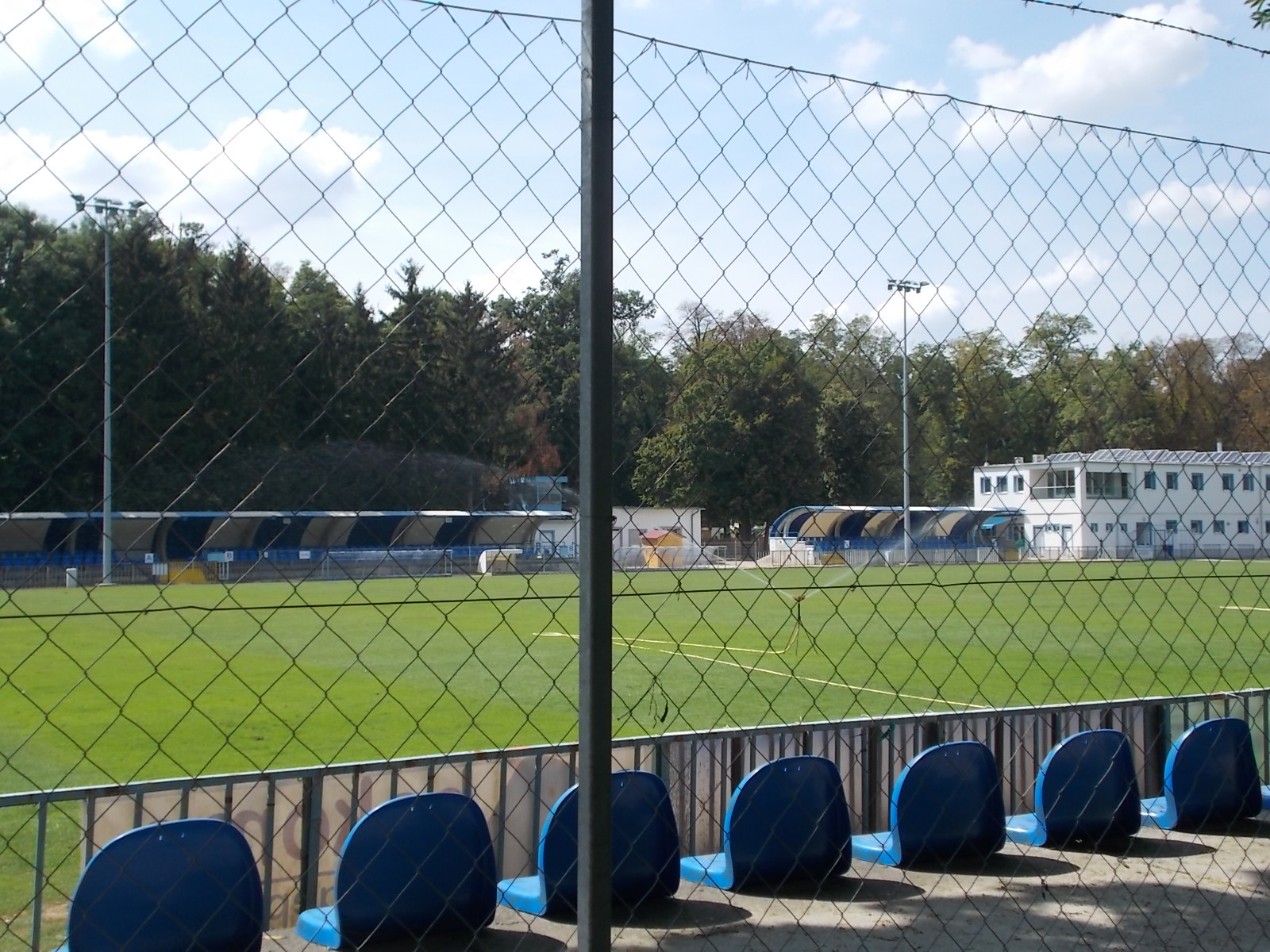
- Interactive map of Wittmann Antal park
- Address: Gazdász u. 10
- Location: Mosonmagyaróvár, Hungary
- Coordinates: 47°53′04.9″N 17°16′36.5″E
- Operator: Mosonmagyaróvári TE
- Capacity: 4,000 seated
- Surface: Grass

Tenant
- Mosonmagyaróvári TE

Wittmann Antal park is a multi-purpose stadium in Mosonmagyaróvár, Hungary. It is currently used mostly for football matches, is the home ground of Mosonmagyaróvári TE and holds 4,000 people.
