= Nemzeti Bajnokság III =

Hungarian third-tier association football league

- Founded: 1940
- Country: Hungary
- Number of clubs: 64 (16 teams in 4 groups)
- Level on pyramid: 3
- Promotion to: Nemzeti Bajnokság II
- Relegation to: Megyei Bajnokság I
- Domestic cup: Magyar Kupa
- Current champions: Gyirmót (Northwest group); Cigánd (Northeast group); Nagykanizsa (Southwest group); Monor (Southeast group); (2025–26)
- Website: mlsz.hu
- Current: 2025–26 Nemzeti Bajnokság III

Nemzeti Bajnokság III (NB III or National Championship III) is the third tier of Hungarian football (from the autumn of 1997 till the spring of 2005, NB III was the fourth tier, the third was NB II). It was contested the first time in the 1940–41 season. It was interrupted between 1944 and 1948, 1951 and 1957, and 1978 and 1981. The tier contains 4 groups (northeast, northwest, southeast and southwest) of 16 teams. From NB III, the champions of each group will battle promotion play-off, two teams winning play-off are promoted to the NB II. The three lowest teams of each group and two worst 13th place teams are relegated to the first tier of local divisions (MB I). From NB II, the two lowest teams are relegated to NB III from 2024–25 season onwards.

== History ==
Nemzeti Bajnokság III was established in the 1940 by the Hungarian Football Federation (HFF). The first champions were the reserved teams of Újpest and Ferencváros along with Nyíregyházi TVE, Goldberger SE, and Losonci AFC. The first edition of the championship included five groups. In the following season, there were six groups. Thanks to the territorial changes of Hungary in the World War II, teams from the annexed territories were added to the championship such as Ungvári AC and Marosvásárhely. Between 1944 and 1948, the championship was terminated. In 1948, the third tier was reorganized by the Hungarian Football Federation. Between 1950 and 1957, the championship was ceased once again. However, the NBIII was relaunched in 1957 for the third time, followed by a short pause between 1978 and 1981. Since 1981, the third tier is continuously organized by the HFF.

== Tier ==
Nemzeti Bajnokság III was either the third or the fourth tier in the Hungarian football league system.

Tier	Seasons
3	1940–41 and 1962–63
4	1963 and 1973–74
3	1974–75

== Format ==
Number of groups	Seasons
2	between 1963 and 1966, between 1997–98 and 1999–2000, between 2003–04 and 2004–05
3	between 1967 and 1973–74, in 1977–78, between 2000–01 and 2002–03, between 2013–14 and 2022–23
4	between 1974–75 and 1976–77, between 2023–24 and present
5	in 1940–41
6	in 1941–42, between 1958–59 and 1962–63, between 1981–82 and 1996–97, between 2005–06 and 2012–13
8	in 1942–43
9	between 1948–49 and 1957–58
13	in 1943–44

From 2023 onwards, the league divided into 4 groups of 16 teams:

- Northeast group
- Northwest group
- Southeast group
- Southwest group

== List of champions (1940–present) ==
- 1940–41: Újpest II, **Nyíregyházi TVE**, **Losonc**, **Goldberger**, Ferencváros II
- 1941–42: WMTK II, **Marosvásárhelyi NMKTK**, **Wekerletelep**, Újpest II, **Kaposvár**, **Kassa**
- 1942–43: **Újszeged**, **Komáromi AC**, **Újpest-Rákospalota**, **Marosvásárhelyi Attila**, Székelyudvarhely, Újpest II, **Felten**, **Munkács**
- 1943–44: Martfű, Szabadka, Székesfehérvár, Dorog, Kolozsvár II, KISTEXT, Nagykanizsai Olajbányász, Kassa, Nagyvárad, Komárom, Székelyudvarhely, Sepsiszentgyörgy
- Between 1944 and 1948, Megyei Bajnokság I functioned as the third league.
- 1948–49: **Dohánygyári Lendület**, **Kisvárda**, **Soproni FAC**, **Magyar Pamut**, **Sajószentpéter**, **Kaposvár**, **Várpalota**, **Kiskunhalas**, **Cegléd**
- 1949–50: **Magyar Posztógyár**, **Nyíregyházi Elektromos**, **Szombathelyi SzMTE**, **Csepeli Papír**, **Egri ESzTK**, **Komló**, **Cegléd**, **Szegedi Honvéd**, **Gyula**
- 1950: Magyar Textil, Debreceni Honvéd, Győri SzMTE, Húsos, Miskolci Honvéd, Pécsbánya, Székesfehérvár, Kiskunfélegyháza, Tótkomlós
- Between 1951 and 1957, Megyei Bajnokság I functioned as the third league.
- 1957–58: Pápai SE, Baja, Diósgyőri Bányász, Nyergesújfalu, Kecskemét, Elektromos, Erzsébet, MGM Debrecen, Szolnoki MTE
- 1958–59: Pápai SE, **Kaposvári MTE**, **Nagybátony**, **Erzsébet**, **Diósgyőri Bányász**, **Orosháza**
- 1959–60: **Ganz-MÁVAG**, **Pécsi BTC**, **Kőbánya**, **Elektromos**, **Nyíregyháza**, **Cegléd**
- 1960–61: **Soproni VSE**, **Kaposvár**, **KISTEXT**, **Traktorgyár**, **DEAC**, **Szegedi Építők**
- 1961–62: **MÁV-DAC**, **PVSK**, **Salgótarján**, **Csepel Autó**, **Egri Dózsa**, **Szegedi VSE**
- 1962–63: Győri Dózsa, Pécsi BTC, Nagybátony, Vörös Csillag, Miskolci Bányász, **Szolnoki MTE**
- 1963: III. Kerület, Egri Dózsa
- 1964: **III. Kerület**, **Jászberény**
- 1965: **Kaposvári Honvéd**, **Egri Dózsa**
- 1966: **Várpalota**, **Budapesti Spartacus**
- 1967: **Győri Dózsa**, **Nagybátony**, **Szolnok**
- 1968: **Zalaegerszeg**, **Székesfehérvár**, **Békéscsaba**
- 1969: **MÁV DAC**, **BVSC**, **Debreceni VSC**
- 1970: Pécsi Ércbányász, Volán SC, Szolnoki MÁV
- 1970–71: **Dorog**, **Volán**, **Pénzügyőr**
- 1971–72: **Szekszárd**, **Miskolc**, **BKV**
- 1972–73: **Nagykanizsai Olajbányász**, Kossuth KFSE, **Budafok**
- 1973–74: **Kaposvár**, **Ózd**, **FŐSPED**
- 1974–75: KOMÉP SC Tatabánya, **BVSC**, **Nagybátony**, **Vasas Izzó**
- 1975–76: **Fűzfő**, **Ganz-MÁVAG**, **Egri Dózsa SE**, **Szolnok**
- 1976–77: **Vác**, **BKV**, **Kazincbarcika**, **Békéscsabai TASK**
- 1977–78: **Pécsi VSK**, **GANZ MÁVAG**, **Ózd**
- Between 1978 and 1981, Megyei Bajnokság I functioned as the third league.
- 1981–82: Fűzfő, **Siófok**, Érd, **Baja**, **Nagybátony**, Balmazújváros
- 1982–83: Veszprém, Kaposvár, Dunaújváros, Mezőtúr, Miskolci Honvéd, Szolnok
- 1983–84: **Tapolca**, Kaposvár, **Dunaújváros**, DÉLÉP, **Vác**, Jászberény
- 1984–85: Mosonmagyaróvár, **Komló**, Oroszlány, DÉLÉP, **Ganz-MÁVAG**, **Mezőtúr**
- 1985–86: MÁV DAC, **Kaposvár**, **Budafok**, **Szarvas**, **Ózd**, Debreceni EAC
- 1986–87: **Ajka**, Mohács, **III. Kerület**, **Kecskeméti SC**, **Kazincbarcika**, Debreceni Kinizsi
- 1987–88: Sopron, Mohács, Oroszlány, Szarvas, Hatvan, Jászberény
- 1988–89: Szegedi Dózsa, Ajka, Paks, Budafok, Salgótarjáni Síküveggyár, Mezőtúr
- 1989–90: Kecskeméti TE, Sabaria, Paksi ASE, BKV Előre, Hatvan, Kaba
- 1990–91: Miske, Ajka, Paks, ESMTK, Bag, Hajdúnánás
- 1991–92: Kiskőrös, Ajka, Kaposvár, Pénzügyőr, Gödöllő, Tiszavasvári
- 1992–93: Tiszakécske, Keszthely, Beremend, Százhalombatta, Rákospalota, Balmazújváros
- 1993–94: Hódmezővásárhely, Sopron, Pécsi VSK, Tatabánya, Salgótarján, Miskolc
- 1994–95: Kecskeméti TE, Balatonfüred, Kaposvár, Érd, Eger, Sényő
- 1995–96: Kiskundorozsma, Körmend, DD Gáz, Gázszer, Szolnok, Tiszafüred
- 1996–97: Kiskőrös, Bük, **Komló**, **Dorog**, Dunakeszi, **Tiszaújváros**
- 1997–98: **Komárom**, **Demecser**
- 1998–99: **Százhalombatta**, **Dunakeszi**
- 1999–2000: **Hévíz**, **Kiskőrös**
- 2000–01: **Bük**, **ESMTK**, Eger
- 2001–02: Bodajk, Balassagyarmat, Demecser
- 2002–03: Bodajk, Dabas, Kertváros
- 2003–04: Mosonmagyaróvár, Makó
- 2004–05: Felcsút, Baktalórántháza
- 2005–06: Békéscsaba, Elekthermax, Szentlőrinc, Budaörs, Jászberény, Tuzsér
- 2006–07: Cegléd, Ajka, Kozármisleny, Tököl, ESMTK, Balkány
- 2007–08: Békéscsaba, Zalaegerszeg II, Szentlőrinc, Százhalombatta, MTK II, Debreceni VSC-DEAC
- 2008–09: Honvéd II, Hévíz, Szentlőrinc, Szigetszentmiklós, Mezőkövesd, Hajdúböszörmény
- 2009–10: Orosháza, Veszprém, Baja, Újpest II, Ferencváros II, Kemecse
- 2010–11: Tököl, Soproni VSE, Paks II, Dunaújváros, Eger, Nagyecsed
- 2011–12: Dunaharaszti, **Csákvár**, **Kaposvár**, Érd, **Putnok**, Kisvárda
- 2012–13: Soroksár, Dorog, **Dunaújváros**, Budaörs, Felsőtárkány, **Kisvárda**
- 2013–14: **Csákvár**, **Soroksár**, Létavértes
- 2014–15: **Budaörs**, **Vác**, **Kisvárda**
- 2015–16: Ferencváros II, **Kozármisleny**, **Nyíregyháza**
- 2016–17: **Győr**, **Budafok**, **Kazincbarcika**
- 2017–18: **Kaposvár**, **Tiszakécske**, **Monor**
- 2018–19: **Ajka**, **Szeged-Grosics Akadémia**, **Szolnok**
- 2019–20: **Érd**, **Pécs**, **DEAC**
- 2020–21: **III. Kerület**, **Iváncsa**, **Tiszakécske**
- 2021–22: **Mosonmagyaróvár**, **Kozármisleny**, **Kazincbarcika**
- 2022–23: Veszprém, Iváncsa, **BVSC**
- 2023–24: **Tatabánya**, **Szentlőrinc**, Putnok, **Békéscsaba**
- 2024–25: Mosonmagyaróvár, Nagykanizsa FC, **Karcag**, **Tiszakécske**
- 2025–26: **Gyirmót**, **Nagykanizsa FC**, Monor, Cigánd

=== Note ===
1. Winning the Nemzeti Bajnokság III did not mean automatic promotion to Nemzeti Bajnokság II. Teams in bold were promoted to the Nemzeti Bajnokság II.
2. The Roman II stands for the reserves teams such as Ferencvárosi TC II and Újpest FC II. However, these clubs could not gain promotion to the second division.
3. Between 1963 and 1973–74, the name of the third division was Nemzeti Bajnokság II.
4. Although the 1974–75 Nemzeti Bajnokság III season was won by KOMÉP SC Tatabánya, Bábolnai SE were promoted and Tatabánya were suspended due to bribery.

=== Name changes ===
- Ajka — Ajkai Hungalu SK, Ajkai Alumínium SK
- Balmazújváros — Balmazújvárosi Lenin TSZ SE
- DAC Nádorváros — MÁV DAC
- Debreceni EAC — Debreceni Universitas SE
- Fűzfő — NIKE Fűzfői AK
- Hatvan — Hatvani KVSC
- Jászberényi Lehel SC — Lehel SC
- Kaposvári Honvéd SE — Honvéd Táncsics SE
- Kaposvári Rákóczi FC — Kaposvári Kinizsi
- Kossuth KFSE — Szentendrei Honvéd SE
- Mezőtúr — Honvéd Szabó Lajos SE
- MGM Debrecen — Debreceni GÖCS Vasas
- Miskolci Honvéd SE — Honvéd Papp József SE
- Mosonmagyaróvár — MOTIM
- Sabaria SE — Szombathelyi Cipőgyàr
- Salgótarjáni BTC — Salgótarján Kohász SE
- Szarvas — Szarvasi Vasas
- Tiszaújváros — Olefin
- Veszprém — Bakony Vegyész TC
- WMTK — Csepel SC

=== Notes ===
DÉLÉP SC: DÉLÉP SC merged with Szegedi AK in 1985

Mezőtúr: Mezőtúri AFC merged with Mezőtúri Honvéd SE (formerly as Honvéd Szabó Lajos SE) in 1977

== Statistics ==
=== Most titles ===
Club	Titles	Winning seasons
Kaposvári Rákóczi FC (including Kaposvári MTE)	11	1941–42, 1948–49, 1958–59, 1960–61, 1973–74, 1982–83, 1985–86, 1991–92, 1994–95, 2011–12, 2017–18
Szolnoki MÁV FC (including Szolnoki MTE)	7	1957–58, 1962–63, 1967, 1975–76, 1982–83, 1995–96, 2018–19
FC Ajka	6	1986–87, 1988–89, 1990–91, 1991–92, 2006–07, 2018–19
Erzsébeti Spartacus MTK LE	5	1957–58, 1958–59, 1990–91, 2000–01, 2006–07
Nagybátonyi Bányász SC	5	1958–59, 1962–63, 1967, 1974–75, 1981–82
Békéscsaba Előre 1912	4	1968, 2005–06, 2007–08, 2023–24
Budafoki MTE	4	1972–73,1985–86, 1988–89, 2016–17
Ceglédi VSE	4	1948–49, 1949–50, 1959–60, 2006–07
Debreceni EAC	4	1960–61, 1985–86, 2007–08, 2019–20
Dorogi FC	4	1943–44, 1970–71, 1996–97, 2012–13
Érdi VSE	4	1981–82, 1994–95, 2011–12, 2019–20
Ganz-MÁVAG SE	4	1959–60, 1975–76, 1977–78, 1984–85
Jászberényi Lehel SE	4	1964, 1983–84, 1987–88, 2005–06
Kazincbarcikai SC	4	1976–77, 1986–87, 2016–17, 2021–22
Kecskeméti TE (including Kecskeméti SC)	4	1957–58, 1986–87, 1989–90, 1994–95
III. kerületi TVE	4	1963, 1964, 1986–87, 2020–21
Kisvárda FC	4	1948–49, 2011–12, 2012–13, 2014–15
Mosonmagyaróvári TE	4	1984–85, 2003–04, 2021–22, 2024–25
Nyíregyháza (including Nyíregyházi Elektromos SK)	4	1940–41, 1949–50, 1959–60, 2015–16
Paksi FC (including Paksi ASE)	4	1988–89, 1989–90, 1990–91, 2010–11
Szentlőrinci SE	4	2005–06, 2007–08, 2008–09, 2023–24
Tiszakécske FC	4	1992–93, 2017–18, 2020–21, 2024–25
Újpesti TE II	4	1940–41, 1941–42, 1942–43, 2009–10
Baja	3	1957–58, 1981–82, 2009–10
Budaörsi SC	3	2005–06, 2012–13, 2014–15
Budapesti VSC	3	1969, 1974–75, 2022–23
BKV Előre SC	3	1971–72, 1976–77, 1989–90
Egri Dózsa SE	3	1961–62, 1963, 1965
Ferencvárosi TC II	3	1940–41, 2009–10, 2015–16
Kiskörösi FC	3	1991–92, 1996–97, 1999–2000
Komlói Bányász SK	3	1949–50, 1984–85, 1996–97
Kozármisleny SE	3	2006–07, 2015–16, 2021–22
Mezőtúr	3	1982–83, 1984–85, 1988–89
Ózdi Kohász SE	3	1973–74, 1977–78, 1985–86
Pécsi VSK	3	1961–62, 1977–78, 1993–94
Salgótarjáni BTC	3	1961–62, 1988–89, 1993–94
Százhalombattai LK	3	1992–93, 1998–99, 2007–08
Vác FC	3	1976–77, 1983–84, 2014–15
FC Veszprém	3	1982–83, 2009–10, 2022–23
Bodajk SE	2	2001–02, 2002–03
Csákvár	2	2011–12, 2013–14
Debreceni VSC	2	1969, 2007–08
Dunaújváros FC (1952)	2	1982–83, 1983–84
Dunaújváros FC (1998)	2	2010–11, 2012–13
FC Eger	2	1994–95, 2000–01
FC Hatvan	2	1987–88, 1989–90
Kassai VSC	2	1941–42, 1943–44
Kispesti Textil SE	2	1943–44, 1960–61
Miskolci Honvéd SE (including Honvéd Papp József SE)	2	1950, 1982–83
Mohácsi FC	2	1986–87, 1987–88
Nagykanizsa	2	2024–25, 2025–26
Nagykanizsai Olajbányász	2	1943–44, 1972–73
Pénzügyőr SE	2	1970–71, 1991–92
Putnok VSE	2	2011–12, 2023–24
RÁBA KÖG SK (as Traktorgyár & Vörös Csillag)	2	1960–61, 1962–63
Székelyudvarhely	2	1942–43, 1943–44
Székesfehérvári	2	1943–44, 1950
VSK Tököl	2	2006–07, 2010–11

== See also ==
- Nemzeti Bajnokság I
- Nemzeti Bajnokság II
- Hungarian Cup
