= Mezőtúri AFC =

Hungarian football club

- Full name: Mezőtúri AFC
- Founded: 11 February 1923
- Ground: Mezőtúri Városi Sportcentrum
- Website: https://www.mezoturiafc.hu/labdarugo-szakosztaly/
Home colours

Mezőtúri Atlétikai Football Club is a professional football club based in Mezőtúr, Jász–Nagykun–Szolnok County Hungary.

== Name changes ==
- 1923 – 1948: Mezőtúri Atlétikai Football Club
- 1937: merger with Mezőtúri Szövőgyári SC
- 1946: merger with Mezőtúri Rákóczi
- 1946: merger with Mezőtúri MaDISz TE
- 1948 – 1948: Mezőtúri Munkás Atlétikai Football Club
- 1948 – 1949: Mezőtúri Atlétikai Football Club
- 1949 – 1951: Mezőtúri SzSE
- 1951 – 1952: Mezőtúri Építők
- 1952 – 1955: Mezőtúri Lokomotív SK
- 1955 – 1957: Mezőtúri Traktor
- 1957 – 1963: Mezőtúri MAFC
- 1963: take-over Mezőtúri Spartacus
- 1963 – 1967: Mezőtúri Spartacus SK
- 1967 – 1977: Mezőtúri Szövetkezeti AFC
- 1977: fusion with Honvéd Szabó Lajos SE
- 1991: merger with Mezőtúri Honvéd SE
- 1991 – ?: Mezőtúri Spartacus AFC
- ? – 2023: Mezőtúri AFC
- 2023 –present: Mezőtúri AFC-RAFI

== Honors ==
- Nemzeti Bajnokság III:
  - Winners (3): 1982–83, 1984–85, 1988–89

== Seasons ==
The highest league that Mezőtúr have ever played was the third tier.

Season	Tier	Club's name	Position	Pts
2025–26	4	Mezőtúri AFC-RAFI	9 / 16	41
2024–25	4	Mezőtúri AFC-RAFI	2 / 16	73
2023–24	4	Mezőtúri AFC-RAFI	3 / 16	70
2022–23	4	Mezőtúri AFC	5 / 16	47
2021–22	4	Mezőtúri AFC	7 / 15	40
2020–21	4	Mezőtúri AFC	7 / 15	46
2019–20	4	Mezőtúri AFC	5 / 15	35
2018–19	4	Mezőtúri AFC	3 / 16	63
2017–18	4	Mezőtúri AFC	7 / 16	51
2016–17	5	Mezőtúri AFC	1 / 16	72
2015–16	5	Mezőtúri AFC	6 / 16	52
2014–15	5	Mezőtúri AFC	7 / 16	47
2013–14	4	Mezőtúri AFC	16 / 16	11
2012–13	4	Mezőtúri AFC	15 / 16	23
2011–12	5	Mezőtúri AFC	1 / 12	51
2010–11	5	Mezőtúri AFC	3 / 14	51
2009–10	4	Mezőtúri AFC	18 / 18	24
2008–09	4	Mezőtúr	9 / 18	44
2007–08	4	Mezőtúri AFC	7 / 18	57
2006–07	3	MAFC Mezőtúr	9 / 14	38
2005–06	3	MAFC Mezőtúr	11 / 15	34
2004–05	4	Mezőtúr	5 / 14	41
2003–04	5	Mezőtúr	1 / 16	74
2002–03	5	Mezőtúri AFC	3 / 16	56
2001–02	5	Mezőtúr	12 / 16	34
2000–01	5	Mezőtúr	11 / 16	33
1999–2000	5	Mezőtúr	9 / 16	42
1998–99	5	Mezőtúr	2 / 16	56
1997–98	5	Mezőtúr	3 / 16	48
1996–97	4	Mezőtúr	10 / 16	32
1995–96	4	Mezőtúri AFC	6 / 18	49
1994–95	4	Mezőtúri AFC	3 / 18	64
1993–94	4	Mezőtúr	9 / 18	38
1992–93	4	Mezőtúr	8 / 16	30
1991–92	3	Mezőtúri Spartacus AFC	14 / 16	20
1976–77	4	Mezőtúri AFC	11 / 18	30
1975–76	4	Mezőtúr	11 / 16	25
1974–75	4	Mezőtúr	2 / 16	43
1973–74	5	Szövetkezeti Mezőtúri AFC	6 / 16	33
1972–73	5	Mezőtúr	2 / 16	40
1971–72	5	Mezőtúr	9 / 16	30
1970–71	5	Mezőtúri AFC	5 / 18	38
1970 tavasz	5	Mezőtúri AFC	2 / 10	24
1969	5	Mezőtúri AFC	12 / 16	25
1968	5	Mezőtúri AFC	5 / 16	37
1967	5	Mezőtúri AFC	7 / 16	30
1966	5	Mezőtúri Spartacus	11 / 16	25
1965	5	Mezőtúri Spartacus SK	9 / 16	29
1964	5	Mezőtúr	8 / 18	28
1963 ősz	5	Mezőtúri Spartacus	7 / 9	11
1962–63	4	MEDOSZ Mezőtúri AFC	5 / 16	34
1961–62	4	Mezőtúri AFC	3 / 16	34
1960–61	4	Mezőtúri AFC	3 / 16	35
1959–60	4	Mezőtúri AFC	4 / 16	37
1958–59	4	Mezőtúri AFC	7 / 16	34
1957–58	4	Mezőtúri AFC	1 / 18	53
1957 tavasz	3	Mezőtúri AFC	6 / 7	10
1956	3	Mezőtúri Traktor	3 / 16	37
1955	3	Mezőtúri Traktor	7 / 17	34
1954	3	Mezőtúri Lokomotív	3 / 16	40
1953	3	Mezőtúri Lokomotív	11 / 16	26
1952	3	Mezőtúri Lokomotív	7 / 14	29
1951	3	Mezőtúri Építők	5 / 14	28
1950 ősz	3	Mezőtúri SzSE	4 / 17	20
1949–50	3	Mezőtúri SzSE	3 / 16	36
1948–49	3	Mezőtúri AFC	12 / 16	27
1947–48	3	Mezőtúri AFC	11 / 16	27
1946–47	3	Mezőtúri AFC	10 / 14	20
1945–46	2	Mezőtúri AFC	14 / 17	20
1943–44	5	Mezőtúri AFC	3 / 11	29
1939–40	3	Mezőtúri AFC	4 / 13	32
1938–39	2	Mezőtúri AFC	13 / 14	15
1937–38	2	Mezőtúri AFC	1 / 12	40
1936–37	2	Mezőtúri AFC	1 / 13	40
1935–36	2	Mezőtúri AFC	3 / 14	36
1934–35	2	Mezőtúri AFC	5 / 14	26
1933–34	2	Mezőtúri AFC	7 / 14	27
1932–33	2	Mezőtúri AFC	4 / 14	32
1931–32	2	Mezőtúri AFC	7 / 14	26
1930–31	2	Mezőtúri AFC	6 / 12	22
1929–30	2	Mezőtúri AFC	10 / 12	14
1928–29	2	Mezőtúri AFC	8 / 10	13
1927–28	2	Mezőtúri AFC	4 / 11	20
1926–27	3	Mezőtúri AFC	1 / 6	17
1925–26	3	Mezőtúri AFC	3 / 9	19
1924–25	2	Mezőtúri AFC	12 / 13	-
1923–24	2	Mezőtúri AFC	7 / 7	6
1922–23	3	Mezőtúri AFC	5 / 8	
