= Sport utcai stadium =

Multi-use stadium in Budapest

Sport utcai stadion
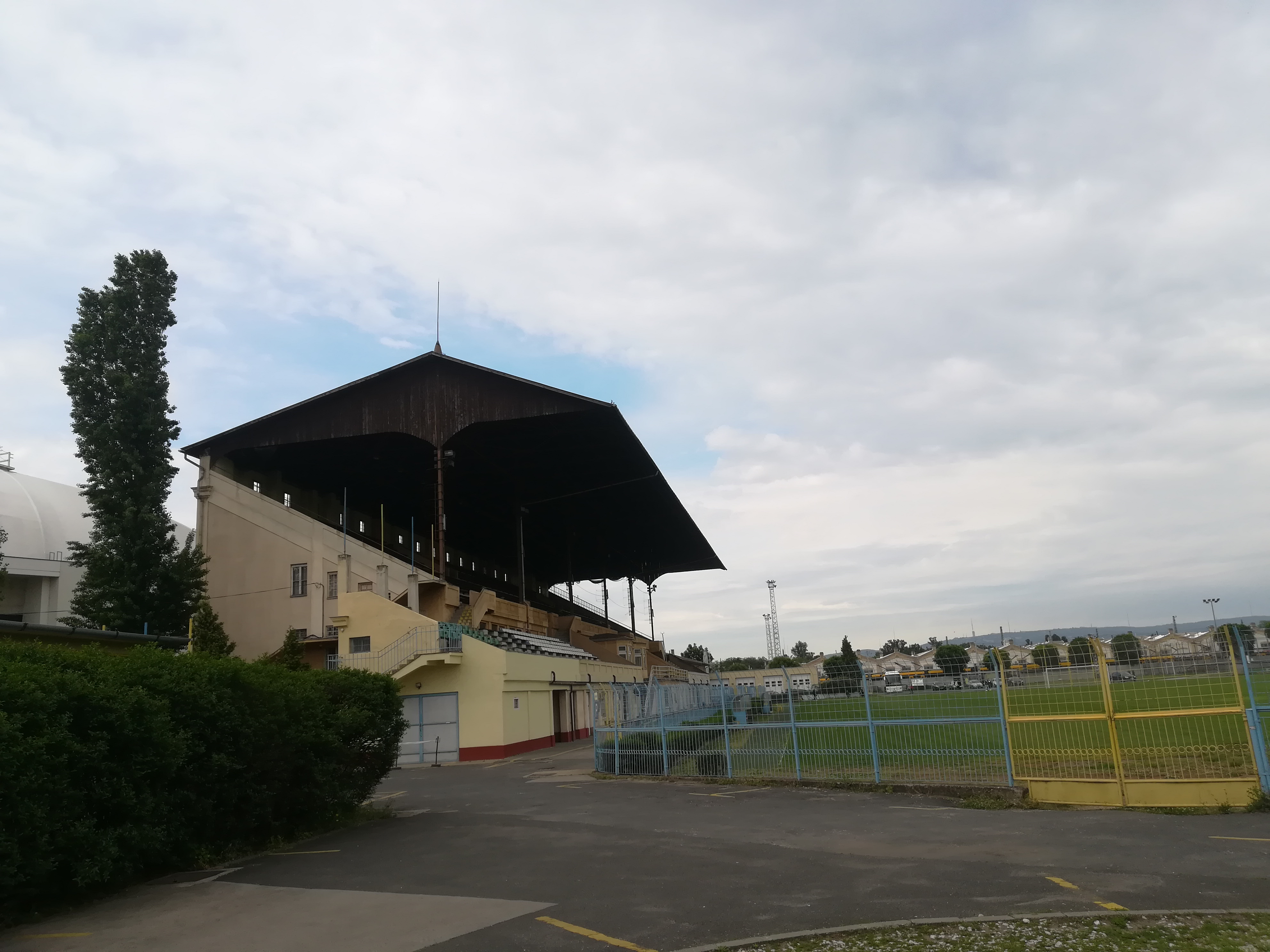
- Sport utcai stadium in 2019.
- Interactive map of Sport utcai stadion
- Former names: Knopp Imre utca (1967–1991)
- Address: Sport u. 2.
- Location: Budapest, Hungary
- Coordinates: 47°29′31.5″N 19°06′22.2″E
- Operator: BKV Előre
- Capacity: 2,500 on seats
- Surface: grass

Construction
- Opened: 1929
- Renovated: 1935, 2002, 2005
- Expanded: 1935

Tenant
- BKV Előre (1935–present)

Sport utcai stadium is a multi-use stadium in Budapest, Hungary. It is used mostly for football matches and is the home ground of BKV Előre. Sport utcai stadion is one of the historical stadiums in Hungary, it was built in 1929, but almost enitre remodeled in 1935 and renovated several times, last times during the 2000s.
