= Ganz-MÁVAG SE =

Hungarian football club

- Full name: Ganz-MÁVAG Sport Egyesület
- Founded: 1910
- Dissolved: 1988
- Ground: Vajda Péter utcai pálya
Home colours

Ganz-MÁVAG Sport Egyesület was a Hungarian football club from the city of Budapest, Hungary.

== History ==
Ganz-MÁVAG Sport Egyesület debuted in the 1945 season of the Hungarian League and finished eleventh.

== Honours ==
=== League ===
- Nemzeti Bajnokság III:
  - Winners (4): 1959–60, 1975–76, 1977–78, 1984–85

== Name Changes ==
- 1910–1921: Ganzgyári SE (Ganz-gyári Labdarúgó Kör)
- 1921–1945: Ganz-gyári Torna Egyesület
- 1945–1945: Ganz VTSE
- 1945–1950: Ganz-gyári Torna Egyesület
- 1950–1951: Ganz Vasas
- 1951–1956: Vasas Ganzvagon SK
- 1956–1957: Ganz TE
- 1957–1958: Ganzvagon TE
- 1958–1959: Vasas Ganzvagon
- 1959: merger with Budapesti MÁVAG SK
- 1959-?: Ganz MÁVAG Vasas SE
- ?-1988: Ganz MÁVAG SE
- 1988: merger with Építők SC

== Seasons ==
The table below shows the seasons of Ganz MÁVAG SE.

Season	Tier	Club's name	Position	Pts
1922–23	5	Ganzgyári TE	2 / 10	29
1923–24	4	Ganzgyári TE	2 / 12	37
1924–25	3	Ganzgyári TE	10 / 14	21
1925–26	3	Ganzgyári TE	5 / 14	32
1926–27	3	Ganzgyári TE	9 / 14	25
1927–28	3	Ganzgyári TE	9 / 17	38
1928–29	3	Ganzgyári TE	6 / 16	36
1929–30	3	Ganzgyári TE	11 / 15	24
1930–31	3	Ganzgyári TE	8 / 14	29
1931–32	3	Ganzgyári TE	7 / 14	26
1932–33	3	Ganz TE	6 / 14	30
1933–34	3	Ganz TE	13 / 14	12
1934–35	4	Ganz TE	4 / 11	27
1935–36	4	Ganz TE	1 / 12	38
1936–37	3	Ganz TE	2 / 14	35
1937–38	2	Ganz TE	6 / 14	27
1938–39	3	Ganz TE	2 / 14	41
1939–40	3	Ganz TE	1 / 13	44
1940–41	2	Ganz TE	6 / 14	29
1941–42	2	Ganz TE	12 / 14	18
1942–43	2	Ganz TE	3 / 14	35
1943–44	2	Ganz TE	2 / 15	43
1944–45	2	Ganz TE	0 / 12	
1944–45	1	Ganz TE	9 / 12	10
1945	1	Ganz VTSE	11 / 12	6
1945–46	2	Ganz TE	2 / 16	44
1946–47	2	Ganz TE	7 / 14	28
1947–48	2	Ganz TE	3 / 14	36
1948–49	2	Ganz TE	10 / 16	27
1949–50	2	Ganz TE	7 / 16	31
1950	2	Ganz Vasas	5 / 16	17
1951	2	Vasas Ganzvagon	9 / 14	22
1952	2	Vasas Ganzvagon	7 / 18	35
1953	2	Vasas Ganzvagon	12 / 16	25
1954	2	Vasas Ganzvagon	8 / 16	31
1955	3	Ganzvagon	3 / 16	43
1956	3	Vasas Ganzvagon	2 / 16	46
1957	3	Ganz TE	1 / 8	20
1957–58	3	Ganzvagon TE	4 / 16	38
1958–59	3	Ganzvagon	10 / 16	29
1959–60	3	Ganz-MÁVAG Vasas SE	1 / 17	52
1960–61	2	Ganz-MÁVAG SE	3 / 16	39
1961–62	2	Ganz-MÁVAG SE	5 / 16	35
1962–63	2	Ganz-MÁVAG SE	8 / 16	29
1963	2	Ganz-MÁVAG SE	15 / 16	10
1964	2	Ganz-MÁVAG SE	10 / 16	28
1965	2	Ganz-MÁVAG SE	7 / 16	32
1966	2	Ganz-MÁVAG SE	6 / 16	33
1967	2	Ganz-MÁVAG SE	8 / 18	34
1968	2	Ganz-MÁVAG SE	8 / 18	35
1969	2	Ganz-MÁVAG SE	13 / 18	31
1970	2	Ganz-MÁVAG SE	6 / 9	15
1970–71	2	Ganz-MÁVAG SE	14 / 18	34
1971–72	2	Ganz-MÁVAG SE	14 / 18	29
1972–73	2	Ganz-MÁVAG SE	10 / 18	32
1973–74	2	Ganz Mávag	12 / 18	31
1974–75	2	Ganz-MÁVAG SE	18 / 20	29
1975–76	3	Ganz-MÁVAG SE	1 / 20	55
1976–77	2	Ganz-Mávag	18 / 20	30
1977–78	3	Ganz-MÁVAG	1 / 20	50
1978–79	2	Ganz-MÁVAG	16 / 19	30
1979–80	2	Ganz-MÁVAG	14 / 20	34
1980–81	2	Ganz-MÁVAG SE	2 / 20	47
1981–82	2	Ganz-MÁVAG	5 / 16	35
1982–83	2	Ganz-MÁVAG Vasas SE	17 / 20	35
1983–84	2	Ganz-MÁVAG Vasas SE	20 / 20	19
1984–85	3	Ganz-MÁVAG	1 / 16	45
1985–86	2	Ganz-MÁVAG	15 / 20	35
1986–87	2	Ganz Mávag	11 / 20	36
