= Tungsram SC =

Hungarian football club

- Full name: Tungsram Sport Club
- Founded: 1911
- Ground: Vízművek pálya
- Capacity: 1,718
- Website: http://www.tungsramsc.hu/
Home colours

Tungsram Sport Club was a Hungarian football club from the town of Budapest, Hungary. The club was affiliated with the Hungarian electronics company Tungsram.

== History ==
Tunsgram SC was established in 1911.

Tungsram Sport Club debuted in the 1954 season of the Hungarian League and finished ninth.

== Name Changes ==
- 1911–?: Ampére SE
- 1951–1957: ÚTE Izzó
- 1957–1959: Újpesti Tungsram TE
- 1959–?: Budapesti Vasas Izzó SK
- ?–1980: Vasas Izzó Sportkör
- 1980: merger with Váci Híradás Vasas SE
- 1980–?: Tungsram SC
- ?–?: Tungsram-Pulzus SC
- ?–1999: Tungsram SC

== Managers ==
- (Hungary) Géza Kalocsay (1954–1955)

== Honours ==
- Nemzeti Bajnokság II
  - Winners (2): 1952, 1953
- Nemzeti Bajnokság III
  - Winners (1): 1974–75

== Seasons ==
The table below shows the seasons of Tunsgram SC.

Season	Tier	Club's name	Position	Pts
1952	2	Vasas Izzó	1 / 18	56
1953	2	Vasas Izzó	1 / 16	48
1954	1	Vasas Izzó SK	8 / 14	25
1955	1	Vasas Izzó SK	13 / 14	13
1956	2	Újpesti Tungsram TE (Vasas Izzó)	4 / 16	41
1957–58	2	Ujpesti Tungsram TE	2 / 19	49
1958–59	2	Újpesti Tungsram TE	11 / 16	27
1959–60	2	Vasas Izzó SC	15 / 16	19
1960–61	3	Vasas Izzó	12 / 16	27
1961–62	3	Vasas Izzó	11 / 16	27
1962–63	3	Izzó	2 / 16	37
1963	3	Vasas Izzó SK	13 / 18	15
1964	3	Vasas Izzó SK	13 / 18	29
1965	3	Vasas Izzó SK	15 / 18	29
1966	3	Vasas Izzó SK	9 / 18	36
1967	3	Vasas Izzó SK	14 / 16	27
1968	4	Vasas Izzó SK	1 / 16	45
1969	3	Vasas Izzó SK	6 / 16	34
1970	3	Vasas Izzó SK	8 / 16	15
1970–71	3	Vasas Izzó SK	3 / 16	37
1971–72	3	Vasas Izzó	6 / 16	31
1972–73	3	Vasas Izzó	9 / 16	31
1973–74	3	Vasas Izzó SC	6 / 16	36
1974–75	3	Vasas Izzó	1 / 20	60
1975–76	2	Bp. Vasas Izzó SK	10 / 20	37
1976–77	2	Vasas Izzó SC	7 / 20	42
1977–78	2	Budapesti Vasas Izzó	2 / 20	54
1978–79	1	Budapesti Vasas Izzó SK	18 / 18	14
1979–80	2	Bp. Vasas Izzó	2 / 20	56
1980–81	3	Vasas Izzó SK	12 / 20	36
1981–82	4	Bp. Vasas Izzó	1 / 16	45
1982–83	4	Tungsram SC	12 / 16	24
1983–84	4	Tungsram SC	16 / 16	17
1984–85	5	Tungsram SC	14 / 16	19
1985–86	5	Tungsram SC	7 / 16	33
1986–87	5	Tungsram SC	6 / 16	34
1988–89	5	Tungsram SC	11 / 16	25
1989–90	5	Tungsram	8 / 16	42
1990–91	5	Tungsram SC	9 / 16	28
1991–92	5	Tungsram SC	12 / 16	23
1992–93	5	Tungsram Pulzus	4 / 16	37
1993–94	5	Tungsram-Pulzus SC	4 / 16	36
1994–95	5	Tungsram SC	9 / 16	37
1995–96	5	Tungsram SC	1 / 16	72
1996–97	4	Tungsram SC	9 / 16	36
1997–98	5	Tungsram SC	14 / 16	29
1998–99	5	Tungsram SC	14 / 16	23
