= Ózdi Kohász SE =

Hungarian football club

- Full name: Ózdi Kohász Sport Egyesület
- Founded: 1909
- Dissolved: 2003
Home colours

Ózdi Kohász Sport Egyesület was a Hungarian football club from the town of Ózd. It remained in existence for nearly a century, before being dissolved in 2003.

== History ==
Ózdi Kohász SE debuted in the 1961–62 season of the Hungarian League and finished thirteenth.

== Name Changes ==
- 1909–1912: Ózdi Vasgyári Sport Egylet
- 1912–1926: Ózdi Vasgyári Alkalmazottak Sport Egyesülete
- 1926–1927: Ózdi Vasgyári Testgyakorlók Köre
- 1926: merger with ÓvTK and Ózdi Törekvés SC
- 1927: merger with ÓvTK and MOVE Ózdi SE
- 1927–1945: MOVE Ózdi Vasgyári Testgyakorló Köre
- 1945–1949: Ózdi Vasas Testgyakorlók Köre
- 1949–1951: Ózdi Vasas SzIT Testgyakorlók Köre
- 1951–1959: Ózdi Vasas Sport Kör
- 1959–1994: Ózdi Kohász Sport Egyesület
- 1994: dissolved
- 2002: BTC Rákosmente moved to Ózd
- 2002–2003: Ózdi Kohász Sport Egyesület
- 2003: dissolved

== Honours ==
- Nemzeti Bajnokság II:
  - Winners (3): 1954, 1960–61, 1980–81
- Nemzeti Bajnokság III:
  - Winners (3): 1973–74, 1977–78, 1985–86

== Seasons ==
The table below shows the seasons of Ózdi Kohász SE.

Season	Tier	Club's name	Position	Pts
1924–25	3	Ózdi Vasgyári Alkalmazottak SE	6 / 8	9
1925–26	3	Ózdi Vasgyári Alkalmazottak SE	1 / 4	10
1926–27	3	Ózdi Vasgyári TK	1 / 5	14
1927–28	2	Ózdi Vasgyári TK	4 / 8	16
1928–29	2	Ózdi Vasgyári TK	2 / 10	21
1929–30	2	Ózdi VTK	4 / 10	19
1930–31	2	Ózdi VTK	5 / 10	16
1931–32	2	Ózdi VTK	4 / 10	20
1932–33	2	Ózdi VTK	9 / 11	
1933–34	3	MOVE Ózdi VTK	1 / 12	38
1934–35	3	Ózdi VTK	2 / 11	32
1935–36	3	Ózdi VTK	1 / 11	33
1936–37	2	Ózdi VTK	3 / 12	28
1937–38	2	Ózdi VTK	4 / 12	28
1938–39	3	Ózdi VTK	1 / 12	36
1939–40	2	MOVE Ózdi VTK	4 / 16	38
1940–41	2	MOVE Ózdi VTK	4 / 14	30
1941–42	2	MOVE Ózdi VTK	5 / 14	28
1942–43	2	Ózdi VTK	6 / 12	22
1943–44	2	Ózdi VTK	6 / 14	27
1944–45	2	MOVE Ózdi VTK	3 / 11	9
1944–45	2	MOVE Ózdi VTK	0 / 12	
1945	2	Ózdi VTK	5 / 8	12
1945–46	2	Ózdi VTK	2 / 12	29
1946–47	2	Ózdi VTK	3 / 14	33
1947–48	2	Ózdi VTK	4 / 13	27
1948–49	2	Ózdi VTK	2 / 16	44
1949–50	2	Ózdi Vasas SzIT TK	3 / 16	41
1950	2	Ózdi Vasas	5 / 16	17
1951	2	Ózdi Vasas	2 / 14	36
1952	2	Ózdi Vasas	2 / 18	51
1953	2	Ózdi Vasas	3 / 16	38
1954	2	Ózdi Vasas	1 / 16	51
1955	2	Ózdi Vasas	13 / 16	25
1956	2	Ózdi VTK	10 / 16	26
1957–58	2	Ózd Vasas TK	11 / 19	36
1958–59	2	Ózdi Kohász	8 / 16	29
1959–60	2	Ózdi Kohász SE	5 / 16	34
1960–61	2	Ózdi Kohász SE	1 / 16	42
1961–62	1	Ózdi Kohász SE	13 / 14	21
1962–63	2	Ózdi Kohász SE	2 / 16	45
1963	2	Ózdi Kohász SE	14 / 16	10
1964	2	Ózdi Kohász SE	2 / 16	37
1965	1	Ózdi Kohász SE	11 / 14	22
1966	1	Ózdi Kohász SE	13 / 14	12
1967	2	Ózdi Kohász SE	15 / 18	31
1968	2	Ózdi Kohász SE	15 / 18	28
1969	2	Ózdi Kohász SE	14 / 18	30
1970	2	Ózdi Kohász SE	7 / 9	15
1970–71	2	Ózdi Kohász SE	15 / 18	32
1971–72	2	Ózdi Kohász SE	17 / 18	23
1972–73	3	Ózdi Kohász SE	11 / 16	30
1973–74	3	Ózdi Kohász	1 / 16	45
1974–75	2	Ózdi Kohász	20 / 20	26
1975–76	3	Ózdi Kohász SE	2 / 20	51
1976–77	2	Ózdi Kohász	17 / 20	30
1977–78	3	Ózdi Kohász	1 / 20	53
1978–79	2	Ózdi Kohász	8 / 20	41
1979–80	2	Ózdi Kohász SE	9 / 20	39
1980–81	2	Ózdi Kohász SE	1 / 20	52
1981–82	1	Ózdi Kohász SE	18 / 18	19
1982–83	2	Ózdi Kohász SE	10 / 20	38
1983–84	2	Ózdi Kohász SE	11 / 20	37
1984–85	2	Ózdi Kohász	18 / 20	31
1985–86	3	Ózdi Kohász SE	1 / 17	54
1986–87	2	Ózdi Kohász SE	16 / 20	33
1987–88	2	Ózdi Kohász	5 / 20	43
1988–89	2	Ózdi Kohász SE	14 / 16	33
1989–90	3	Ózdi Kohász SE	2 / 16	59
1990–91	3	Ózdi Kohász SE	3 / 16	40
1991–92	3	Ózdi Kohász SE	3 / 16	42
1992–93	3	Ózdi Kohász SE	10 / 16	29
1993–94	3	Ózdi Kohász SE	8 / 16	31
2002–03	3	Ózdi Kohász	4 / 12	37
2002–03	3	Ózdi Kohász	5 / 12	51

== Managers ==
- Miklós Benczés (2024–)
