= Mosonmagyaróvári TE =

Hungarian football club

- Full name: Mosonmagyaróvári Torna Egylet
- Short name: MTE
- Founded: 1904; 122 years ago
- Ground: Wittmann Antal park
- Capacity: 4,000
- Manager: Ádám Weitner
- League: NB III
- 2023–24: NB II, 18th of 18 (relegated)
- Website: https://mte1904.hu/
| Home colours | Away colours |

Mosonmagyaróvári Torna Egylet are a Hungarian association football club from the town of Mosonmagyaróvár, who play in the Hungarian Nemzeti Bajnokság III (third tier).

== History ==
Mosonmagyaróvári TE debuted in the 2016–17 Nemzeti Bajnokság II season of the Hungarian League.

On 7 March 2023, Csaba Horváth was sacked.

On 27 March 2023, Attila Supka was appointed as the new coach of the club.

On 13 April 2023, Attila Supka was sacked.

Mosonmagyaróvár won the 2024–25 Nemzeti Bajnokság III season; therefore, they were eligible to play in the promotion play-offs. On 1 June 2025, Mosonmagyaróvár were defeated 3-0 by Tiszakécske FC at home. On 9 June 2025, Mosonmagyaróvár beat Tiszakécske 2-0 away. Since Tiszakécske won 3-2 on aggregate, they were promoted to the second tier, Nemzeti Bajnokság II.

== Honours ==
=== League ===
- Nemzeti Bajnokság III:
  - Winners (4): 1984–85, 2003–04, 2021–22, 2024–25

== Players ==
=== First team squad ===
As of 20 December 2025.

Note: Flags indicate national team as defined under FIFA eligibility rules; some limited exceptions apply. Players may hold more than one non-FIFA nationality.

| No. | Pos. | Nation | Player |
|---|---|---|---|
| 2 | DF | HUN | Gergő Simita |
| 4 | DF | HUN | Máté Czingráber |
| 5 | DF | HUN | Attila Ocskay |
| 7 | FW | HUN | Márton Pap |
| 10 | MF | HUN | Péter Kövesdi |
| 14 | DF | HUN | Gábor Vágó |
| 15 | MF | HUN | Áron Gönye |
| 16 | DF | HUN | Bence Sipos |
| 17 | MF | HUN | Dávid Illés |
| 18 | MF | HUN | Botond Buglyó |
| 20 | FW | HUN | Zalán Gera |
| 21 | MF | HUN | Kristóf Méhes |
| 23 | DF | HUN | Botond Gáncs |

| No. | Pos. | Nation | Player |
|---|---|---|---|
| 26 | MF | HUN | Péter Tullner |
| 31 | MF | HUN | Máté Menyhárt |
| 32 | MF | HUN | Máté Járeb |
| 37 | MF | HUN | Miklós Kitl |
| 44 | GK | HUN | Márk Molnár |
| 57 | GK | HUN | Benedek Kovács |
| 66 | MF | HUN | Viktor Pongrácz |
| 91 | FW | HUN | Benedek Baróti |
| 92 | FW | HUN | Milán Erdei |
| — | DF | HUN | Noel Monda |
| — | FW | HUN | Ákos Herczeg |
| — | MF | HUN | Levente Kovács |

== Managers ==
(Hungary) József Király

== Seasons ==
The table below shows the seasons of Mosonmagyaróvári TE.

| Season | Tier | Club's name | Position | Pts |
|---|---|---|---|---|
| 1922–23 | 3 | Magyaróvári TE | 3 / 7 | 3 |
| 1923–24 | 3 | Magyaróvári TE | 4 / 7 | 12 |
| 1924–25 | 3 | Magyaróvári TE | 2 / 8 | 20 |
| 1925–26 | 3 | Magyaróvári TE | 4 / 11 | 29 |
| 1926–27 | 3 | Magyaróvári TE | 2 / 10 | 28 |
| 1927–28 | 3 | Magyaróvári TE | 2 / 11 | 32 |
| 1928–29 | 3 | Magyaróvári TE | 2 / 11 | 28 |
| 1929–30 | 3 | Magyaróvári TE | 3 / 13 | 35 |
| 1930–31 | 3 | Magyaróvári TE | 2 / 10 | 19 |
| 1932–33 | 3 | Magyaróvári TE | 6 / 11 | 20 |
| 1933–34 | 3 | Magyaróvári TE | 0 / 8 | |
| 1934–35 | 3 | Magyaróvári SE | 0 / 11 | 7 |
| 1935–36 | 3 | Magyaróvári SE | 0 / 7 | 8 |
| 1942–43 | 5 | Magyaróvári LE | 1 / 11 | 33 |
| 1943–44 | 4 | Magyaróvári LE | 8 / 12 | 20 |
| 1944–45 | 3 | Mosonmagyaróvári LE | 0 / 10 | |
| 1946–47 | 5 | Műselyemgyári TE | 1 / 7 | 23 |
| 1947–48 | 4 | Műselyemgyári TE | 9 / 14 | 23 |
| 1948–49 | 4 | Mosonmagyaróvári Ipartelepi MTE | 3 / 16 | 37 |
| 1949–50 | 4 | Mosonmagyaróvári IMTE | 1 / 15 | 43 |
| 1950 | 3 | Mosonmagyaróvári SzMTE | 13 / 17 | 12 |
| 1951 | 3 | Mosonmagyaróvári Timföldgyári Vasas | 10 / 12 | 15 |
| 1952 | 3 | Mosonmagyaróvári Timföld | 13 / 14 | 19 |
| 1953 | 3 | Mosonmagyaróvári Timföld | 7 / 12 | 25 |
| 1954 | 3 | Mosonmagyaróvári Timföld | 6 / 14 | 30 |
| 1955 | 3 | Mosonmagyaróvári Timföld | 2 / 14 | 35 |
| 1956 | 3 | Mosonmagyaróvári Timföld | 1 / 16 | 39 |
| 1957 | 2 | Mosonmagyaróvári TE | 3 / 8 | 17 |
| 1957–58 | 2 | Mosonmagyaróvári TE | 10 / 19 | 36 |
| 1958–59 | 2 | Mosonmagyaróvári TE | 11 / 16 | 28 |
| 1959–60 | 2 | Mosonmagyaróvári TE | 6 / 16 | 31 |
| 1960–61 | 2 | Mosonmagyaróvár TE | 7 / 16 | 31 |
| 1961–62 | 2 | Mosonmagyaróvári TE | 10 / 16 | 25 |
| 1962–63 | 2 | Mosonmagyaróvári TE | 12 / 16 | 24 |
| 1963 | 3 | Mosonmagyaróvári TE | 16 / 18 | 12 |
| 1964 | 3 | Mosonmagyaróvári TE | 12 / 18 | 30 |
| 1965 | 3 | Mosonmagyaróvári TE | 15 / 18 | 30 |
| 1966 | 3 | Mosonmagyaróvári TE | 18 / 18 | 7 |
| 1967 | 4 | Mosonmagyaróvári TE | 11 / 16 | 27 |
| 1968 | 4 | Mosonmagyaróvári TE | 3 / 16 | 33 |
| 1969 | 4 | Mosonmagyaróvári Timföld TE | 7 / 16 | 32 |
| 1970 | 4 | Motim TE | 5 / 16 | 18 |
| 1970–71 | 4 | Mosonmagyaróvári Timföld TE | 2 / 16 | 45 |
| 1971–72 | 4 | Motim TE | 3 / 16 | 36 |
| 1972–73 | 4 | Mosonmagyaróvári Timföld TE | 3 / 16 | 39 |
| 1973–74 | 4 | Motim TE | 2 / 16 | 42 |
| 1974–75 | 3 | Motim TE | 5 / 20 | 39 |
| 1975–76 | 3 | Motim TE | 8 / 19 | 36 |
| 1976–77 | 3 | Motim TE | 12 / 20 | 39 |
| 1977–78 | 4 | Motim TE | 1 / 18 | 55 |
| 1978–79 | 3 | MOTIM TE | 2 / 18 | 47 |
| 1979–80 | 3 | MOTIM TE | 2 / 18 | 59 |
| 1980–81 | 3 | MOTIM TE | 1 / 18 | 54 |
| 1981–82 | 3 | MOTIM TE | 2 / 18 | 48 |
| 1982–83 | 3 | Mosonmagyaróvári TE | 7 / 18 | 35 |
| 1983–84 | 3 | MOTIM TE | 7 / 18 | 36 |
| 1984–85 | 3 | MOTIM TE | 1 / 18 | 54 |
| 1985–86 | 3 | MOTIM TE | 7 / 18 | 37 |
| 1986–87 | 3 | MOTIM TE | 9 / 18 | 37 |
| 1987–88 | 3 | MOTIM TE | 7 / 18 | 38 |
| 1988–89 | 3 | Motim TE | 5 / 16 | 48 |
| 1989–90 | 3 | Motim TE | 4 / 16 | 49 |
| 1990–91 | 3 | Motim TE | 4 / 16 | 36 |
| 1991–92 | 3 | Motim TE | 8 / 16 | 35 |
| 1992–93 | 3 | MOTIM TE | 5 / 16 | 34 |
| 1993–94 | 3 | MOTIM TE | 2 / 16 | 41 |
| 1994–95 | 3 | MOTIM TE | 8 / 16 | 43 |
| 1995–96 | 3 | Motim TE | 8 / 16 | 41 |
| 1996–97 | 3 | MOTIM TE | 2 / 16 | 61 |
| 1997–98 | 3 | MTE-MOTIM | 6 / 16 | 46 |
| 1998–99 | 3 | MTE-MOTIM | 8 / 16 | 34 |
| 1999–00 | 3 | MTE Motim | 6 / 16 | 42 |
| 2000 | 2 | MTE-MOTIM | 6 / 7 | 9 |
| 2000–01 | 3 | MTE-Motim | 3 / 12 | 39 |
| 2001–02 | 3 | Mosonmagyaróvári TE | 7 / 13 | 34 |
| 2002–03 | 3 | Mosonmagyaróvári TE | 9 / 12 | 48 |
| 2002–03 | 3 | Mosonmagyaróvári TE | 9 / 12 | 25 |
| 2003–04 | 3 | Mosonmagyaróvár | 1 / 16 | 65 |
| 2004–05 | 2 | Mosonmagyaróvári TE 1904 | 10 / 14 | 31 |
| 2005–06 | 2 | Mosonmagyaróvári TE | 14 / 16 | 30 |
| 2006–07 | 2 | Mosonmagyaróvári TE | 8 / 16 | 40 |
| 2007–08 | 2 | Mosonmagyaróvári TE | 16 / 16 | 13 |
| 2008–09 | 3 | MTE Mosonmagyaróvár | 10 / 16 | 38 |
| 2009–10 | 3 | Első Mosonmagyaróvári TE 1904 | 5 / 14 | 44 |
| 2010–11 | 3 | Mosonmagyaróvári TE 1904 | 4 / 16 | 53 |
| 2011–12 | 3 | Mosonmagyaróvári TE 1904 | 10 / 15 | 37 |
| 2012–13 | 3 | Futura Mosonmagyaróvári TE 1904 | 3 / 14 | 54 |
| 2013–14 | 3 | Futura Mosonmagyaróvári TE 1904 | 8 / 16 | 43 |
| 2014–15 | 3 | Futura Mosonmagyaróvári TE 1904 | 12 / 16 | 29 |
| 2015–16 | 3 | Mosonmagyaróvári TE 1904 | 2 / 17 | 69 |
| 2016–17 | 2 | CREDOBUS Mosonmagyaróvár | 9 / 20 | 54 |
| 2017–18 | 2 | CREDOBUS Mosonmagyaróvár | 15 / 20 | 45 |
| 2018–19 | 2 | CREDOBUS Mosonmagyaróvár | 19 / 20 | 31 |
| 2019–20 | 3 | CREDOBUS Mosonmagyaróvár | 8 / 16 | 25 |
| 2020–21 | 3 | CREDOBUS Mosonmagyaróvár | 2 / 20 | 74 |
| 2021–22 | 3 | CREDOBUS Mosonmagyaróvár | 1 / 20 | 100 |
| 2022–23 | 2 | CREDOBUS Mosonmagyaróvár | 12 / 20 | 46 |
| 2023–24 | 2 | CREDOBUS Mosonmagyaróvár | 18 / 18 | 21 |
| 2024–25 | 3 | CREDOBUS Mosonmagyaróvár | 1 / 16 | 69 |
| 2025–26 | 3 | CREDOBUS Mosonmagyaróvár | 7 / 16 | 47 |
