= FŐSPED Szállítók SE =

Hungarian football club

- Full name: FŐSPED Szállítók SE
- Founded: 1948
- Dissolved: 1985
- Ground: Péceli út
Home colours

FŐSPED Szállítók SE is a defunct professional football club based in Budapest, Hungary.

== Name changes ==
- Nagyvásártelepi MSE: 1948.08. – 1948.11.17.
- Szállítómunkások SE: 1948.11.17. – 1951
- 1951: merger with Belsped Szállítók
- Előre Belsped: 1951 – 1954
- Budapesti Szállítók SE: 1954 – 1955
- Törekvés Szállítók SE: 1955 – 1957
- Szállítómunkások Sport Clubja: 1957 – 1957
- Szállítók SE: 1957 – 1959
- FŐSPED Szállítók SE: 1959 – 1976
- 22.sz.Volán: 1976 – 1985
- 1985: dissolved, rights were transferred to Rákosmenti TK

== Honours ==
- Nemzeti Bajnokság II:
  - Winners (1): 1970
- Nemzeti Bajnokság III:
  - Winners (1): 1973–74

== Seasons ==
The table below shows FŐSPED Szállítók SE's seasons.

Season	Tier	Club's name	Position	Pts
1948–49	6	Szállítók	3 / 15	39
1949–50	5	Szállítómunkások SE	2 / 16	46
1950	4	Szállítómunkások SE	2 / 16	21
1951	3	Belsped	6 / 12	21
1952	3	Előre Belsped	1 / 14	43
1953	3	Előre Belsped	1 / 16	53
1954	3	Budapesti Szállítók	1 / 16	52
1955	2	Törekvés Szállítók SE	13 / 16	27
1956	2	Szállítók SE	11 / 16	26
1957–58	2	Szállítók SE	6 / 19	40
1958–59	2	Szállítók SE	5 / 16	32
1959–60	2	FŐSPED Szállítók SE	2 / 16	40
1960–61	2	FŐSPED Szállítók SE	3 / 16	35
1961–62	2	FŐSPED Szállítók SE	8 / 16	27
1962–63	2	FŐSPED Szállítók SE	6 / 16	32
1963	2	FŐSPED Szállítók	8 / 16	15
1964	2	FŐSPED Szállítók SE	13 / 16	27
1965	2	FŐSPED Szállítók SE	5 / 16	33
1966	2	FÖSPED Szállítok	9 / 16	30
1967	2	FŐSPED Szállítók SE	5 / 18	40
1968	2	Szállítók SE	9 / 18	34
1969	2	FŐSPED Szállítók SE	11 / 18	32
1970	2	FŐSPED Szállítók SE	1 / 9	19
1970–71	2	FŐSPED Szállítók SE	10 / 18	37
1971–72	2	FŐSPED Szállítók SE	18 / 18	19
1972–73	3	Fősped Szállítók	2 / 16	40
1973–74	3	FŐSPED Szállítók SE	1 / 16	51
1974–75	2	FŐSPED Szállítók SE	17 / 20	33
1975–76	2	FŐSPED Szállítók SE	17 / 20	26
1976–77	3	22. sz. Volán Szállítók	12 / 20	41
1977–78	3	22. sz. Volán SE	6 / 20	47
1978–79	2	22. sz. Volán SE	4 / 19	43
1979–80	2	22.sz Volán SE	7 / 20	38
1980–81	2	22.sz Volán SE	14 / 20	34
1981–82	2	22.sz Volán SC	2 / 16	39
1982–83	2	22. sz. Volán SE	9 / 20	38
1983–84	2	22. sz. Volán SE	9 / 20	37
1984–85	2	22. sz. Volán SC	19 / 20	17
