= Oroszlányi Bányász SC =

Hungarian football club

- Full name: Oroszlányi Bányász Sport Club
- Founded: 1946
- Dissolved: 1995
- Ground: Chudik Lajos Városi Sporttelep
Home colours	Away colours

Oroszlányi Bányász Sport Club was a football club from the town of Oroszlány, Hungary.

== History ==
Oroszlány won the 1957 Nemzeti Bajnokság II season.

== Grounds ==
- Chudik Lajos Városi Sporttelep

== Name changes ==
- Oroszlányi MTE: 1946 – 1949
- Oroszlányi Tárna: 1949 – 1951
- Oroszlányi Bányász SK: 1951 – 1992
- Oroszlányi Bányász SC: 1992 – 1995
- dissolved in 1995

== Honours ==
=== League ===
- Nemzeti Bajnokság II:
  - Winners (1): 1957
  - Runners-up (2): 1963, 1988–89
  - Third place (4): 1964, 1970, 1970–71, 1989–90
- Nemzeti Bajnokság III:
  - Winners (2): 1984–85, 1987–88

== Seasons ==
The table below shows the seasons of Oroszlányi Bányász SC.

Season	Tier	Club's name	Position	Pts
1946–47	5	Oroszlány	3 / 12	33
1947–48	5	Oroszlányi MTE	1 / 13	39
1948–49	5	Oroszlányi MTE	1 / 12	37
1949–50	4	Oroszlányi Tárna	7 / 16	32
1950	4	Oroszlányi Tárna	7 / 14	16
1951	3	Oroszlányi Bányász	3 / 10	24
1952	3	Oroszlányi Bányász	6 / 14	28
1953	3	Oroszlányi Bányász	4 / 18	35
1954	3	Oroszlányi Bányász	4 / 16	40
1955	3	Oroszlányi Bányász	14 / 16	25
1956	3	Oroszlányi Bányász	1 / 16	41
1957	2	Oroszlányi Bányász SK	1 / 6	16
1957–58	2	Oroszlányi Bányász SK	8 / 19	39
1958–59	2	Oroszlányi Bányász	9 / 16	28
1959–60	2	Oroszlányi Bányász SK	9 / 16	28
1960–61	2	Oroszlányi Bányász SK	10 / 16	29
1961–62	2	Oroszlányi Bányász SK	6 / 16	35
1962–63	2	Oroszlányi Bányász SK	7 / 16	32
1963	2	Oroszlányi Bányász SK	2 / 16	19
1964	2	Oroszlányi Bányász SK	3 / 16	34
1965	2	Oroszlányi Bányász SK	13 / 16	27
1966	2	Oroszlányi Bányász SK	7 / 16	32
1967	2	Oroszlányi Bányász SK	4 / 18	41
1968	2	Oroszlányi Bányász	6 / 18	36
1969	2	Oroszlányi Bányász SK	8 / 18	35
1970	2	Oroszlányi Bányász SK	3 / 9	20
1970–71	2	Oroszlányi Bányász SK	3 / 18	49
1971–72	2	Oroszlányi Bányász SK	15 / 18	29
1972–73	2	Oroszlányi Bányász SK	9 / 18	33
1973–74	2	Oroszlányi Bányász SK	13 / 18	30
1974–75	2	Oroszlányi Bányász SK	8 / 20	40
1975–76	2	Oroszlányi Bányász SK	14 / 20	33
1976–77	2	Oroszlányi Bányász	19 / 20	24
1977–78	3	Oroszlányi Bányász	4 / 20	46
1978–79	2	Oroszlányi Bányász	17 / 20	32
1979–80	3	Oroszlányi Bányász SK	2 / 16	50
1980–81	2	Oroszlányi Bányász	20 / 20	21
1981–82	3	Oroszlányi Bányász SK	6 / 18	41
1982–83	3	Oroszlányi Bányász SK	9 / 18	31
1983–84	3	Oroszlányi Bányász SK	2 / 18	49
1984–85	3	Oroszlányi Bányász	1 / 18	52
1985–86	3	Oroszlányi Bányász SK	6 / 18	40
1986–87	3	Oroszlányi Bányász SK	4 / 18	43
1987–88	3	Oroszlányi Bányász SK	1 / 18	57
1988–89	2	Oroszlányi Bányász SK	2 / 16	62
1989–90	2	Oroszlányi Bányász SK	3 / 16	55
1990–91	2	Oroszlányi Bányász SE	6 / 16	30
1991–92	2	Oroszlányi Bányász SE	16 / 16	19
1992–93	5	Oroszlányi Bányász	1 / 15	56
1993–94	4	Oroszlányi Bányász SC	2 / 16	48
1994–95	4	Oroszlányi Bányász SC	2 / 16	57
