= BKV Előre SC =

Hungarian football club

- Full name: BKV Előre Sport Club
- Founded: 1912; 114 years ago
- Ground: Sport utcai stadium, Budapest, Hungary
- Capacity: 2,500
- Chairman: Péter Takács
- Manager: Béla Balogh
- League: NB III; Southeast
- 2023–24: NB III; Southeast, 7th of 16
- Website: https://bkvelore.hu/
Home colours	Away colours

BKV Előre SC is a Hungarian football club located in Budapest, Hungary. It currently plays in the Nemzeti Bajnokság III – Southeast, the third tier of Hungarian football. The team's colors are yellow and blue.

== History ==
BKV won the 1942–43 Nemzeti Bajnokság II season and gained promotion to the first division. However, BKV finished in the last position in the 1943–44 Nemzeti Bajnokság I season and were relegated to the second tier.

BKV won the 1948–49 Nemzeti Bajnokság II and gained promotion to the top tier once again. The club spent two consecutive seasons in the top division. In the 1950 Nemzeti Bajnokság I season, the club finished in the 14th position and were relagated.

== Honours ==
=== League ===
- Nemzeti Bajnokság II:
  - Winners (3): 1942–43, 1948–49, 2000–01
- Nemzeti Bajnokság III:
  - Winners (3): 1971–72, 1976–77, 1989–90
- Magyar Kupa
  - Runners-up (1): 1933–34

== Seasons ==
As of 18 October 2026.

Season	Tier	Club's name	Position	Pts
1913–14	4	Budapesti KVT	9 / 23	28
1914	2	Budapesti KVT	0 / 9	
1915	2	Budapesti KVT	7 / 12	10
1915	2	Budapesti KVT	12 / 12	3
1916	2	Budapesti KVT TSE	2 / 8	7
1916–17	2	Budapesti KVT TSE	8 / 12	16
1917–18	2	Budapesti KVT TSE	12 / 12	-
1918–19	2	Budapesti EVV TSE	12 / 12	11
1919–20	2	Budapesti EVV TSE	10 / 16	25
1920–21	2	Budapesti EVV TSE	10 / 14	19
1921–22	3	Budapesti EVV TSE	15 / 15	6
1922–23	3	Budapesti EVV TSE	15 / 15	6
1926–27	3	BSzKRT SE	5 / 16	36
1927–28	3	BSzKRT SE	1 / 17	53
1928–29	2	BSzKRT SE	5 / 10	21
1929–30	2	BSzKRT SE	3 / 14	29
1930–31	2	BSzKRT SE	2 / 14	40
1931–32	2	BSzKRT SE	3 / 14	37
1932–33	2	BSzKRT SE	4 / 15	38
1933–34	2	BSzKRT SE	3 / 12	31
1934–35	2	BSzKRT SE	3 / 12	28
1935–36	2	BSzKRT	2 / 13	33
1936–37	2	BSzKRT SE	1 / 13	38
1937–38	2	BSzKRT SE	4 / 14	32
1938–39	2	BSzKRT	8 / 14	25
1939–40	2	BSzKRT	3 / 16	43
1940–41	1	BSzKRT SE	11 / 14	19
1941–42	2	BSzKRT SE	2 / 14	41
1942–43	2	BSZKRT	1 / 14	44
1943–44	1	BSzKRT SE	16 / 16	16
1944–45	2	BSzKRT SE	0 / 12	
1944–45	1	BSzKRT SE	11 / 12	6
1945	2	Előre SE	4 / 12	28
1945–46	2	Előre SE	4 / 14	32
1946–47	2	Előre SE	7 / 14	27
1947–48	2	Előre SE	3 / 14	33
1948–49	2	Előre SE	1 / 16	49
1949–50	1	Előre SE	13 / 16	17
1950	1	Előre SE	14 / 16	10
1951	2	Budapesti Előre	2 / 14	36
1952	2	Budapesti Előre	4 / 18	44
1953	2	Budapesti Előre	3 / 16	37
1954	2	Budapesti Előre	5 / 16	36
1955	3	Fővárosi Villamosvasút	8 / 16	28
1956	3	Fővárosi Villamosvasút	9 / 14	21
1957	3	Budapesti Előre SC	2 / 8	17
1957–58	2	Budapesti Előre SC	4 / 19	43
1958–59	2	Budapesti Előre SC	4 / 16	33
1959–60	2	Budapesti Előre	12 / 16	28
1960–61	2	Budapesti Előre SC	7 / 16	30
1961–62	2	Budapesti Előre SC	3 / 16	35
1962–63	2	Budapesti Előre	14 / 16	24
1963	3	Budapesti Előre SC	14 / 18	14
1964	3	Budapesti Előre SC	6 / 18	38
1965	3	Budapesti Előre SC	3 / 18	41
1966	3	Budapesti Előre SC	3 / 18	46
1967	2	Budapesti Előre SC	6 / 18	36
1968	2	Budapesti Előre SC	4 / 18	39
1969	2	BKV Előre SC	15 / 18	30
1970	2	BKV Előre SC	7 / 9	14
1970–71	2	BKV Előre SC	18 / 18	27
1971–72	3	BKV Előre SC	1 / 16	45
1972–73	2	BKV Előre SC	17 / 18	26
1973–74	3	BKV Előre SC	3 / 16	35
1974–75	3	BKV Előre	3 / 20	50
1975–76	3	BKV Előre SC	3 / 20	47
1976–77	3	BKV Előre SC	1 / 20	62
1977–78	2	BKV Előre SC	16 / 20	31
1978–79	2	BKV Előre	13 / 19	33
1979–80	2	BKV Előre	10 / 20	37
1980–81	2	BKV Előre SC	15 / 20	34
1981–82	2	BKV Előre	13 / 16	23
1982–83	3	BKV Előre SC	7 / 18	33
1983–84	3	BKV Előre SC	2 / 16	42
1984–85	3	BKV Előre	4 / 16	34
1985–86	3	BKV Előre SC	7 / 18	37
1986–87	3	BKV Előre SC	6 / 18	39
1987–88	3	BKV Előre SC	10 / 18	28
1988–89	3	BKV Előre	11 / 16	42
1989–90	3	BKV Előre SC	1 / 16	67
1990–91	2	BKV Előre SC	11 / 16	26
1991–92	2	BKV Előre SC	2 / 16	37
1992–93	2	BKV Előre SC	3 / 16	36
1993–94	2	BKV Előre SC	6 / 16	33
1994–95	2	BKV Előre SC	2 / 16	60
1995–96	2	BKV Előre SC	6 / 16	48
1996–97	2	BKV Előre SC	11 / 16	41
1997–98	3	BKV Előre SC	4 / 16	50
1998–99	3	BKV Előre SC	2 / 16	55
1999–00	2	BKV Előre SC	3 / 20	66
2000	2	BKV Előre SC	1 / 7	34
2000–01	2	BKV Előre SC	1 / 12	39
2001–02	2	BKV Előre	6 / 12	38
2001–02	2	BKV Előre SC	6 / 12	31
2002–03	2	BKV Előre SC	12 / 20	43
2003–04	2	BKV Előre	7 / 18	51
2004–05	2	BKV Előre SC	8 / 14	33
2005–06	2	BKV Előre	12 / 16	31
2006–07	2	BKV Előre	12 / 16	38
2007–08	2	BKV Előre SC	13 / 16	29
2008–09	2	BKV Előre SC	8 / 16	40
2009–10	2	BKV Előre SC	8 / 15	38
2010–11	2	BKV Előre SC	5 / 16	48
2011–12	2	BKV Előre SC	11 / 16	35
2012–13	2	BKV Előre	12 / 16	33
2013–14	3	BKV Előre	3 / 16	55
2014–15	3	BKV Előre	7 / 16	40
2015–16	3	BKV Előre	8 / 17	47
2016–17	3	BKV Előre	12 / 18	45
2017–18	3	BKV Előre	8 / 16	45
2018–19	3	BKV Előre	9 / 16	38
2019–20	3	BKV Előre	12 / 16	20
2020–21	3	BKV Előre	17 / 20	44
2021–22	3	BKV Előre	3 / 20	74
2022–23	3	BKV Előre	9 / 20	51
2023–24	3	BKV Előre	7 / 16	46
2024–25	3	BKV Előre	14 / 16	27
2025–26	3	BKV Előre	12 / 16	32
