= Komlói Bányász SK =

Hungarian football club

- Full name: Komlói Bányász Sport Klub
- Founded: 1922
- Ground: Bányász Stadion
- Capacity: 10,000
- League: Baranya megyei I. osztály
- Website: https://www.komloibanyasz.hu/
Home colours	Away colours

Komlói Bányász Sport Klub is a professional association football club based in Baranya County, Komló, Hungary.

== History ==
Komlói Bányász SK first played in the 1957–58 season of the Hungarian League and finished thirteenth.

== Name changes ==
- 1922: Komló SC
- 1931–1949: Komlói SE
- 1949–1950: Komlói Tárna Sport Egyesület
- 1950–1951: Komlói Szakszervezeti Sport Egyesület
- 1951–2016: Komlói Bányász SK
- 2016–present: Sport 36-Komlói Bányász Sport Klub

== Honours ==
- Nemzeti Bajnokság II:
  - Winners (2): 1956, 1960–61
- Nemzeti Bajnokság III:
  - Winners (3): 1949–50, 1984–85, 1996–97
- Magyar Kupa:
  - Runners-up (2): 1970, 1973–74

== European cup history ==
Season	Competition	Round	Club	Home	Away	Aggregate
1971–72	European Cup Winners' Cup	First round	(Socialist Federal Republic of Yugoslavia) Red Star Belgrade	2–7	2–1	4–8

== Seasons ==
The table below shows the seasons of Komlói Bányász.

Season	Tier	Club's name	Position	Pts
1932–33	2	Komlói SE	9 / 11	
1933–34	2	Komlóbányatalepi SE	12 / 12	8
1934–35	3	Komlói SE	5 / 13	27
1935–36	3	Komlói SE	0 / 8	
1936–37	3	Komlói SE	1 / 10	26
1937–38	2	Komlói SE	12 / 12	11
1938–39	4	Komlói SE	2 / 14	41
1939–40	4	Komlói SE	1 / 11	32
1940–41	4	Komlói SE	11 / 14	18
1941–42	4	Komlói SE	6 / 12	19
1942–43	4	Komlói SE	7 / 10	6
1943–44	4	Komlóbányatelepi SE	4 / 11	24
1945–46	2	Komlói SE	9 / 12	17
1947–48	3	Komlói SE	8 / 14	22
1948–49	3	Komlói SE	3 / 16	43
1949–50	3	Komlói Tárna SE	1 / 16	51
1950	2	Komlói SzSE	12 / 16	14
1951	2	Komlói Bányász	8 / 14	23
1952	2	Komlói Bányász	6 / 18	38
1953	2	Komlói Bányász	2 / 16	39
1954	2	Komlói Bányász	5 / 16	33
1955	2	Komlói Bányász	4 / 16	35
1956	2	Komlói Bányász SK	1 / 16	47
1957–58	1	Komlói Bányász SK	13 / 14	17
1958–59	2	Komlói Bányász SK	2 / 16	41
1959–60	2	Komlói Bányász SK	3 / 16	38
1960–61	2	Komlói Bányász SK	1 / 16	47
1961–62	1	Komlói Bányász SK	12 / 14	21
1962–63	1	Komlói Bányász SK	10 / 14	24
1963	1	Komlói Bányász SK	4 / 14	16
1964	1	Komlói Bányász SK	12 / 14	18
1965	1	Komlói Bányász SK	13 / 14	18
1966	2	Komlói Bányász SK	3 / 16	34
1967	1	Komlói Bányász SK	15 / 16	24
1968	2	Komlói Bányász SK	2 / 18	46
1969	1	Komlói Bányász SK	12 / 16	24
1970	1	Komlói Bányász SK	7 / 8	8
1970–71	1	Komlói Bányász SK	14 / 16	24+2=26
1971–72	1	Komlói Bányász SK	8 / 16	31
1972–73	1	Komlói Bányász SK	16 / 16	19
1973–74	2	Komlói Bányász SK	3 / 18	43
1974–75	2	Komlói Bányász SK	4 / 20	46
1975–76	2	Komlói Bányász SK	11 / 20	37
1976–77	2	Komlói Bányász SK	12 / 20	34
1977–78	2	Komlói Bányász SK	13 / 20	34
1978–79	2	Komlói Bányász SK	2 / 20	50
1979–80	2	Komlói Bányász SK	8 / 20	41
1980–81	2	Komlói Bányász SK	8 / 20	40
1981–82	2	Komlói Bányász SK	10 / 16	28
1982–83	3	Komlói Bányász SK	5 / 16	34
1983–84	3	Komlói Bányász SK	5 / 16	35
1984–85	3	Komlói Bányász SK	1 / 16	47
1985–86	2	Komlói Bányász SK	9 / 20	37
1986–87	2	Komlói Bányász SK	5 / 20	41
1987–88	2	Komlói Bányász SK	6 / 20	42
1988–89	2	Komlói Bányász SK	5 / 16	50
1989–90	2	Komlói Bányász SK	6 / 16	44
1990–91	2	Komlói Bányász Sk	14 / 16	23
1991–92	3	Komlói Bányász SK	4 / 16	36
1992–93	3	Komlói Bányász SK	2 / 16	40
1993–94	3	Komlói Bányász SK	4 / 16	36
1994–95	3	Komlói Bányász SK	3 / 16	62
1995–96	3	Komlói Bányász SK	6 / 16	48
1996–97	3	Komlói Bányász SK	1 / 16	65
1997–98	2	Komlói Bányász SK	16 / 20	43
1998–99	2	Komlói Bányász SK	10 / 20	53
1999–00	2	Komlói Bányász SK	14 / 20	49
2000	2	Komlói Bányász SK	7 / 7	0
2000–01	3	Komlói Bányász SK	6 / 12	29
2001–02	3	Komlói Bányász SK	10 / 13	25
2002–03	3	Komlói Bányász SK	4 / 12	46
2002–03	3	Komlói Bányász SK	6 / 12	35
2003–04	3	Komlói Bányász SK	2 / 16	62
2004–05	3	Komlói Bányász SK	13 / 16	38
2005–06	3	Komlói Bányász SK	2 / 16	62
2006–07	3	Komlói Bányász SK	2 / 14	56
2007–08	2	Komlói Bányász SK	14 / 16	26
2008–09	3	Komlói Bányász SK	9 / 16	42
2009–10	3	Komlói Bányász SK	13 / 14	20
2010–11	3	Komlói Bányász SK	16 / 16	22
2011–12	3	Komlói Bányász SK	6 / 15	46
2012–13	3	Komlói Bányász SK	7 / 14	40
2013–14	3	Komlói Bányász SK	16 / 16	12
2014–15	4	Komlói Bányász SK	1 / 16	79
2015–16	3	Komlói Bányász SK	6 / 17	45
2016–17	3	Sport 36-Komlói Bányász SK	18 / 18	9
2017–18	4	Sport 36-Komlói Bányász SK	4 / 15	54
2018–19	4	Sport 36-Komlói Bányász SK	7 / 15	38
2019–20	4	Sport 36-Komlói Bányász SK	2 / 14	34
2020–21	4	Sport 36-Komlói Bányász SK	11 / 15	33
2021–22	4	Sport 36-Komlói Bányász SK	11 / 15	29
2022–23	4	Sport 36-Komlói Bányász SK	6 / 15	45
2023–24	4	Sport 36-Komlói Bányász SK	6 / 8	27
2024–25	4	Sport 36-Komlói Bányász SK	2 / 9	46
2025–26	4	Sport 36-Komlói Bányász SK	3 / 10	55
