= DAC Nádorváros 1912 SE =

DAC Nádorváros
- Full name: Dunántúli Atlétikai Club Nádorváros 1912
- Founded: 1912
- Stadium: Nádorvárosi Stadion
- Capacity: 6,000
- Chairman: Ferenc Lengyel
- Manager: Tivadar Birkás
- League: Megyei Bajnokság I
- 2010–2011: 11th
- Website: https://www.dac1912.com/
Home colours	Away colours

DAC Nádorváros 1912 Sportegyesület is a Hungarian football club based in Győr. The club, known as Integrál-DAC at the time, was declared bankrupt in 2009, but was re-founded as DAC Nádorváros.

== History ==
Although DAC Nádorváros won the Bakony group of the 1985–86 Nemzeti Bajnokság III season, they lost the promotion play-offs and; therefore, did not qualify for the second league.

== Honours ==
- Nemzeti Bajnokság III:
  - Winners (1): 1985–86

== Seasons ==
As of 20 October 2026.

Season	Tier	Club's name	Position	Pts
1918–19	3	Dunántúli AC	3 / 5	4
1919–20	2	Dunántúli AC	4 / 8	8
1920–21	2	Dunántúli AC	1 / 8	
1921–22	2	Dunántúli AC	0 / 8	
1922–23	2	Dunántúli AC	5 / 10	19
1923–24	2	DAC-Hungária-Vasutas SE	5 / 10	21
1924–25	2	DAC-Hungária-Győri Vasutas SE	3 / 11	24
1925–26	2	DAC-Hungária-Győri Vasutas SE	6 / 10	18
1926–27	2	DAC-Hungária-Győri Vasutas SE	5 / 10	20
1927–28	2	DAC-Hungária-Győri Vasutas SE	5 / 10	18
1928–29	2	DAC-Hungária-Győri Vasutas SE	2 / 10	26
1929–30	2	Dunántúli AC	3 / 11	29
1930–31	2	Dunántúli AC	6 / 11	19
1931–32	2	Dunántúli AC	9 / 11	15
1932–33	2	Dunántúli AC	3 / 12	26
1933–34	2	Dunántúli AC	5 / 12	22
1934–35	2	Dunántúli AC	6 / 12	20
1935–36	2	Dunántúli AC	10 / 14	23
1936–37	2	TEDAC	8 / 13	22
1937–38	2	Dunántúli AC	12 / 14	19
1938–39	3	Dunántúli AC	8 / 14	23
1939–40	3	Dunántúli AC	8 / 14	24
1940–41	4	DAC (Győr)	7 / 14	26
1941–42	4	Dunántúli AC	7 / 14	27
1942–43	4	Dunántúli AC	5 / 12	19
1943–44	4	Dunántúli AC	10 / 12	19
1944–45	3	Dunántúli AC	0 / 10	
1945–46	2	MÁV Dunántúli AC	3 / 14	40
1946–47	2	MÁV DAC	4 / 14	32
1947–48	2	MÁV Dunántúli AC	3 / 14	33
1948–49	2	Győri Vasutas SE	10 / 16	27
1949–50	2	Győri Vasutas SK	8 / 16	29
1950	2	Győri VSK	14 / 16	13
1951	3	Győri Lokomotív	1 / 12	40
1952	2	Győri Lokomotív	9 / 18	34
1953	2	Győri Lokomotív	9 / 16	28
1954	2	Győri Lokomotív	7 / 16	31
1955	2	Győri Törekvés	16 / 16	21
1956	3	Győri Törekvés	8 / 16	31
1957	3	MÁV Dunántúli AC	6 / 6	5
1957–58	4	MÁV Dunántúli AC	2 / 16	46
1958–59	4	MÁV Dunántúli AC	4 / 16	37
1959–60	4	MÁV-Dunántúli AC	1 / 17	46
1960–61	3	MÁV DAC Győr	2 / 16	40
1961–62	3	MÁV-DAC	1 / 16	44
1962–63	2	Győri MÁV DAC	5 / 16	32
1963	2	Győri MÁV DAC	3 / 16	19
1964	2	Győri MÁV DAC	7 / 16	30
1965	2	Győri MÁV DAC	10 / 16	28
1966	2	Győri MÁV DAC	16 / 16	22
1967	3	MÁV DAC	7 / 16	31
1968	3	MÁV DAC	2 / 16	44
1969	3	MÁV DAC	1 / 16	42
1970	2	Győri MÁV DAC	4 / 9	18
1970–71	2	Győri MÁV Dunántúli AC	5 / 18	44
1971–72	2	MÁV DAC	4 / 18	42
1972–73	2	MÁV DAC	3 / 18	43
1973–74	2	MÁV DAC	5 / 18	37
1974–75	2	Győri MÁV DAC	6 / 20	42
1975–76	2	MÁV DAC	12 / 20	34
1976–77	2	MÁV DAC	15 / 20	33
1977–78	2	MÁV DAC	20 / 20	22
1978–79	2	MÁV DAC	4 / 20	41
1979–80	2	MÁV Dunántúli AC	10 / 20	37
1980–81	2	MÁV Dunántúli AC	10 / 20	38
1981–82	2	MÁV Dunántúli AC	13 / 16	21
1982–83	3	MÁV Dunántúli AC	13 / 18	32
1983–84	3	MÁV DAC	14 / 18	29
1984–85	3	Győri MÁV DAC	5 / 18	44
1985–86	3	MÁV DAC	1 / 18	50
1986–87	3	MÁV DAC	5 / 18	39
1987–88	3	MÁV DAC	5 / 18	40
1988–89	3	MÁV DAC (Győr)	12 / 16	40
1989–90	3	Betka-MÁV DAC	5 / 16	48
1990–91	3	Betka-MÁV DAC	3 / 16	38
1991–92	3	Betka-MÁV DAC	5 / 16	37
1992–93	3	Betka-MÁV DAC	7 / 16	28
1993–94	3	Botka-MÁV DAC	11 / 16	26
1994–95	3	Betka-MÁV DAC	7 / 16	44
1995–96	3	Betka-MÁV DAC	13 / 16	34
1996–97	3	Betka- MÁV DAC	16 / 16	8
1997–98	4	Betka- MÁV DAC	15 / 16	14
1998–99	5	Betka-MÁV DAC	4 / 18	61
1999–00	5	MÁV-DAC	6 / 18	53
2000–01	5	Győri MÁV DAC	8 / 18	47
2001–02	5	Integrál-DAC	5 / 16	41
2002–03	5	Integrál-DAC	1 / 16	81
2003–04	4	Integrál DAC	2 / 16	65
2004–05	3	Integrál DAC	3 / 16	52
2005–06	2	Integrál-DAC	4 / 16	51
2006–07	2	Integrál-DAC	11 / 16	39
2007–08	2	Integrál DAC	5 / 16	49
2008–09	2	Dunántúli AC 1912 FC	11 / 16	34
2009–10	6	Sasfészek FC Győr Egyesület	13 / 16	31
2010–11	6	DAC 1912 FC	6 / 13	35
2011–12	6	DAC 1912 SE	1 / 16	73
2012–13	5	DAC 1912 SE	2 / 16	69
2013–14	4	DAC 1912 SE	14 / 16	26
2014–15	4	DAC Foci 24	6 / 16	45
2015–16	4	DAC-Foci24 1912 SE	12 / 15	32
2016–17	6	DAC Utánpótlás FC	2 / 12	54
2017–18	5	DAC Utánpótlás FC	9 / 16	36
2018–19	5	DAC Utánpótlás FC	5 / 16	61
2019–20	5	DAC Utánpótlás FC	1 / 16	50
2020–21	4	DAC Nádorváros 1912 SE	3 / 16	57
2021–22	4	DAC Nádorváros 1912 SE	12 / 16	24
2022–23	4	DAC Nádorváros 1912 SE	11 / 15	29
2023–24	4	DAC Nádorváros 1912 SE	13 / 13	4
2024–25	4	DAC Nádorváros 1912 SE	10 / 16	36
2025–26	6	DAC Nádorváros 1912 SE	1 / 15	78
