= 1960–61 Nemzeti Bajnokság III =

Nemzeti Bajnokság III
- Season: 1960–61
- Champions: Soproni VSE (Northwest); Kaposvári Kinizsi SK (Southwest); KISTEXT SK (North); Traktorgyári SE (North-centre); Debreceni EAC (Northeast); Szegedi Építők SK (Southeast)
- Promoted: Soproni VSE (Northwest); Kaposvári Kinizsi SK (Southwest); KISTEXT SK (North); Traktorgyári SE (North-centre); Debreceni EAC (Northeast); Szegedi Építők SK (Southeast)

The 1960–61 Nemzeti Bajnokság III season was the 11th edition of the Nemzeti Bajnokság III.

== League tables ==
=== Northwestern group ===
Pos	Teams	Pld	W	D	L	GF	GA	GD	Pts	Promotion or relegation
1	Soproni VSE	30	20	3	7	83	26	57	43	Promotion to Nemzeti Bajnokság II
2	MÁV DAC Győr	30	17	6	7	58	31	27	40	
3	Pápai Textiles	30	16	5	9	51	29	22	37	
4	Nagykanizsai Bányász	30	14	9	7	45	30	15	37	
5	Győri Dózsa SE	30	14	6	10	61	44	17	34	
6	Várpalotai Bányász SK	30	12	10	8	49	45	4	34	
7	Szombathelyi Vasas	30	11	11	8	54	46	8	33	
8	Keszthelyi Előre Petőfi SK	30	11	9	10	35	41	-6	31	
9	Balinkai Bányász	30	12	5	13	49	80	-31	29	
10	Soproni SOTEX SE	30	10	7	13	41	45	-4	27	
11	Szombathelyi Pamutipar	30	9	8	13	46	58	-12	26	
12	Szombathelyi Cipőgyár SE	30	8	9	13	33	46	-13	25	
13	Szombathelyi Dózsa	30	10	4	16	38	49	-11	24	Relegation to Megyei Bajnokság I
14	Kapuvári SE	30	9	4	17	44	56	-12	22	Relegation to Megyei Bajnokság I
15	Almásfüzitői Olajmunkás	30	8	4	18	32	63	-31	20	Relegation to Megyei Bajnokság I
16	Nagykanizsai VTE	30	6	6	18	33	63	-30	18	Relegation to Megyei Bajnokság I

=== Southwestern group ===
Pos	Teams	Pld	W	D	L	GF	GA	GD	Pts	Promotion or relegation
1	Kaposvári Kinizsi	30	19	5	6	77	31	46	43	Promotion to Nemzeti Bajnokság II
2	Kaposvári MTE	30	19	4	7	75	34	41	42	
3	Bajai Bácska Posztó	30	16	8	6	64	35	29	40	
4	Pécsi VSK	30	16	7	7	53	28	25	39	
5	Székesfehérvári MÁV Előre SC	30	16	6	8	71	46	25	38	
6	Csepel Autó SE	30	15	5	10	54	51	3	35	
7	Kaposvári Dózsa	30	13	6	11	56	50	6	32	
8	Szekszárdi Petőfi	30	12	6	12	55	63	-8	30	
9	Pécsi Vasas	30	11	6	13	42	54	-12	28	
10	Pécsi Bányász	30	10	7	13	40	40	0	27	
11	Bajai Építők	30	10	7	13	31	40	-9	27	
12	Kiskunhalasi Dózsa 1	30	9	7	14	32	53	-21	25	
13	Pécsi EAC	30	8	7	15	56	64	-8	23	Relegation to Megyei Bajnokság I
14	Mázai Bányász	30	7	6	17	40	68	-28	20	Relegation to Megyei Bajnokság I
15	Kaposvári Honvéd SE	30	5	6	19	36	73	-37	16	Relegation to Megyei Bajnokság I
16	Bonyhádi Vasas	30	5	5	20	29	81	-52	15	Relegation to Megyei Bajnokság I

=== Northern group ===
Pos	Teams	Pld	W	D	L	GF	GA	GD	Pts	Promotion or relegation
1	KISTEXT SK	30	18	8	4	70	26	44	44	Promotion to Nemzeti Bajnokság II
2	Salgótarjáni Kohász SE	30	16	6	8	57	31	26	38	
3	Nagybátonyi Bányász SC	30	15	6	9	53	34	19	36	
4	Vasas Ikarus SK	30	10	13	7	45	28	17	33	
5	Gázművek MTE	30	12	8	10	43	42	1	32	
6	Baglyasaljai Bányász	30	11	8	11	48	36	12	30	
7	Georghiu Dej Hajógyár	30	13	4	13	44	62	-18	30	
8	Vasas Dinamó	30	11	7	12	34	35	-1	29	
9	Kisterenyei Bányász	30	11	6	13	33	37	-4	28	
10	Sashalmi Elektronikus SE	30	11	6	13	36	41	-5	28	
11	Salgótarjáni Tűzhelygyár	30	11	6	13	44	51	-7	28	
12	Vasas Kábelgyár	30	12	4	14	38	48	-10	28	
13	Budapest-Rákosfalvai ESC	30	9	9	12	45	51	-6	27	Relegation to Megyei Bajnokság I
14	Goldberger SE	30	10	6	14	39	67	-28	26	Relegation to Megyei Bajnokság I
15	Zagyvapálfalvai Építők	30	7	8	15	34	55	-21	22	Relegation to Megyei Bajnokság I
16	Vasas Generátor SK	30	8	5	17	31	50	-19	21	Relegation to Megyei Bajnokság I

=== Northcentral group ===
Pos	Teams	Pld	W	D	L	GF	GA	GD	Pts	Promotion or relegation
1	Traktorgyári SE	30	20	4	6	72	39	33	44	Promotion to Nemzeti Bajnokság II
2	III. kerületi TTVE	30	13	10	7	49	32	17	36	
3	Szentendrei Honvéd	30	13	10	7	49	36	13	36	
4	Annavölgyi Bányász	30	15	6	9	55	53	2	36	
5	Esztergomi Vasas	30	15	4	11	56	42	14	34	
6	Újlaki FC	30	13	8	9	53	48	5	34	
7	Tokodi Bányász	30	12	7	11	38	37	1	31	
8	Nyergesújfalui Viscosa	30	12	6	12	50	48	2	30	
9	Sárisápi Bányász	30	12	6	12	44	53	-9	30	
10	Törekvés SE	30	10	8	12	40	46	-6	28	
11	Pilisi Bányász	30	10	8	12	39	45	-6	28	
12	Vasas Izzó	30	11	5	14	49	49	0	27	
13	Kerámia SC	30	10	6	14	40	46	-6	26	Relegation to Megyei Bajnokság I
14	Autótaxi	30	8	6	16	47	64	-17	22	Relegation to Megyei Bajnokság I
15	Budapesti Helyiipari SC	30	9	4	17	30	48	-18	22	Relegation to Megyei Bajnokság I
16	Testnevelési Főiskola SE	30	5	6	19	45	70	-25	16	Relegation to Megyei Bajnokság I

=== Northeastern group ===
Pos	Teams	Pld	W	D	L	GF	GA	GD	Pts	Promotion or relegation
1	Debreceni EAC	30	19	9	2	68	19	49	47	Promotion to Nemzeti Bajnokság II
2	Debreceni Gördülőcsapágygyár	30	14	12	4	61	28	33	40	
3	Miskolci Bányász	30	17	5	8	58	49	9	39	
4	Egri Vasas 1	30	18	1	11	74	45	29	37	
5	Egercsehi Bányász	30	13	7	10	41	32	9	33	
6	Debreceni Kinizsi	30	14	4	12	39	42	-3	32	
7	Rudabányai Bányász	30	12	7	11	52	48	4	31	
8	Debreceni Honvéd	30	10	10	10	39	42	-3	30	
9	Miskolci MTE	30	11	7	12	37	43	-6	29	
10	Gyöngyösi Spartacus	30	11	6	13	37	49	-12	28	
11	Kisvárdai Vasas	30	11	5	14	47	47	0	27	
12	Somsályi Bányász	30	10	6	14	41	46	-5	26	
13	Tiszalöki Vörös Meteor Építők	30	9	6	15	46	53	-7	24	
14	Debreceni Építők	30	7	7	16	26	52	-26	21	Relegation to Megyei Bajnokság I
15	Rózsaszentmártoni Bányász	30	9	2	19	41	72	-31	20	Relegation to Megyei Bajnokság I
16	Püspökladányi MÁV	30	6	4	20	32	72	-40	16	Relegation to Megyei Bajnokság I

=== Southeastern group ===
Pos	Teams	Pld	W	D	L	GF	GA	GD	Pts	Promotion or relegation
1	Szegedi Építők	30	18	5	7	63	29	34	41	Promotion to Nemzeti Bajnokság II
2	Gyulai MEDOSZ	30	16	7	7	73	40	33	39	
3	Szolnoki MTE	30	15	7	8	60	33	27	37	
4	Kecskeméti TE	30	14	7	9	43	31	12	35	
5	Csongrád Petőfi	30	14	6	10	67	55	12	34	
6	Szegedi Spartacus	30	13	8	9	56	43	13	34	
7	Orosházi Kinizsi SE	30	10	13	7	35	35	0	33	
8	MEDOSZ Hódmezővásárhelyi MTE	30	13	6	11	67	68	-1	32	
9	Jászberényi Lehel SC	30	12	6	12	70	54	16	30	
10	Békéscsabai Építők	30	12	6	12	55	50	5	30	
11	Martfűi MSE	30	12	6	12	53	54	-1	30	
12	Szarvasi SC	30	12	4	14	45	51	-6	28	
13	Makói Vasas	30	8	12	10	31	39	-8	28	Relegation to Megyei Bajnokság I
14	Törökszentmiklósi Fáklya	30	7	10	13	33	54	-21	24	Relegation to Megyei Bajnokság I
15	Békéscsabai Agyagipar	30	5	7	18	27	72	-45	17	Relegation to Megyei Bajnokság I
16	Kiskunfélegyházai Építők	30	2	4	24	17	87	-70	8	Relegation to Megyei Bajnokság I

== See also ==
- 1960–61 Magyar Kupa
- 1960–61 Nemzeti Bajnokság I
- 1960–61 Nemzeti Bajnokság II
