= 1965 Nemzeti Bajnokság III =

Nemzeti Bajnokság III
- Season: 1965
- Champions: Kaposvári Honvéd SE (West); Egri Dózsa SC (East)
- Promoted: Kaposvári Honvéd SE (West); Egri Dózsa SC (East)

The 1965 Nemzeti Bajnokság III season was the 1st edition of the Nemzeti Bajnokság III.

== League tables ==
=== Western group ===
Pos	Teams	Pld	W	D	L	GF	GA	GD	Pts	Promotion or relegation
1	Kaposvári Honvéd SE	34	19	8	7	56	25	31	46	Promotion to Nemzeti Bajnokság II
2	Várpalotai Bányász SK	34	18	7	9	67	39	28	43	
3	Budai Spartacus SC	34	14	11	9	42	27	15	39	
4	Zalaegerszegi TE	34	15	9	10	59	44	15	39	
5	Székesfehérvári MÁV Előre SC	34	13	11	10	37	48	-11	37	
6	Fővárosi Autóbusz SK	34	13	8	13	51	52	-1	34	
7	Esztergomi Vasas	34	10	14	10	41	42	-1	34	
8	Pécsi Bányász SE	34	13	8	13	47	54	-7	34	
9	Pécsi VSK	34	13	8	13	42	51	-9	34	
10	Zalaegerszegi Dózsa	34	13	7	14	43	43	0	33	
11	Kaposvári Kinizsi	34	13	6	15	49	45	4	32	
12	Veszprémi Haladás	34	11	9	14	45	47	-2	31	
13	Pápai Textiles SE	34	11	8	15	44	48	-4	30	
14	Győri Dózsa SE	34	10	10	14	44	49	-5	30	
15	Mosonmagyaróvári TE	34	13	4	17	54	61	-7	30	
16	Vasas Ikarus SK	34	11	8	15	48	56	-8	30	Relegation to Megyei Bajnokság I
17	Láng Vasas SK	34	9	12	13	40	49	-9	30	Relegation to Megyei Bajnokság I
18	Pécsi BTC	34	8	10	16	37	66	-29	20	Relegation to Megyei Bajnokság I

=== Eastern group ===
Pos	Teams	Pld	W	D	L	GF	GA	GD	Pts	Promotion or relegation
1	Egri Dózsa SC	34	20	8	6	66	26	40	48	Promotion to Nemzeti Bajnokság II
2	Kecskeméti Dózsa	34	18	6	10	57	33	24	42	
3	Budapesti Előre SC	34	16	9	9	51	30	21	41	
4	Pénzügyőr SE	34	14	13	7	48	36	12	41	
5	Borsodi Bányász SE	34	16	8	10	50	34	16	40	
6	Szolnoki MÁV SE	34	16	7	11	45	38	7	39	
7	Budapesti Spartacus SC	34	15	8	11	52	38	14	38	
8	Gyulai MEDOSZ	34	11	12	11	38	38	0	34	
9	Nagybátonyi Bányász SC	34	12	10	12	31	40	-9	34	
10	Szolnoki MTE	34	13	7	14	37	55	-18	83	
11	KISTEXT SK	34	11	10	13	36	49	-13	32	
12	Szegedi VSE	34	9	13	12	56	47	9	31	
13	Békéscsabai Előre SC	34	11	9	14	38	45	-7	31	
14	Miskolci Bányász	34	12	5	17	45	58	-13	29	
15	Vasas Izzó SK	34	10	9	15	31	47	-16	29	
16	Debreceni Honvéd	34	8	9	17	36	55	-19	25	Relegation to Megyei Bajnokság I
17	Kisterenyei Bányász	34	8	8	18	33	53	-20	24	Relegation to Megyei Bajnokság I
18	Martfűi MSE	34	7	7	20	33	61	-28	21	Relegation to Megyei Bajnokság I

== See also ==
- 1965 Magyar Kupa
- 1965 Nemzeti Bajnokság I
- 1965 Nemzeti Bajnokság II
