= József Dálnoki =

Hungarian footballer (born 1935)

Personal information
- Date of birth: 21 November 1935 (age 90)
- Place of birth: Pesterzsébet, Kingdom of Hungary
- Position: Striker

Senior career*
| Years | Team | Apps | (Gls) |
| 1954–1957 | Pesterzsébeti Vasas | 24 | (0) |
| 1957–1961 | Ferencváros | 31 | (3) |
| 1961–1969 | Budapesti Spartacus | 191 | (26) |
| Total | | 246 | (29) |

Managerial career
- 1985–1986: Göd
- 1986–1987: Dunai Kőolaj
- 1987–1990: Dömsöd
- 1990–1992: ESMTK
- 1992–1993: Rákospalota
- 1995–1998: Íris
- 1998: Kistarcsa
- 1998: Budakalász
- 1999–2000: ESMTK
- * Club domestic league appearances and goals

József Dálnoki (born 21 November 1935) is a Hungarian former football manager and professional player who played as a striker.

== Club career ==
Dálnoki was a striker who played for Ferencváros between 1957 and 1960, making 62 appearances and scoring 11 goals in all competitions for the club.

He later played for Budapesti Spartacus and helped the club win the 1966 third-tier Eastern Group title, earning promotion to the second division.

== Managerial career ==
=== Göd ===
Dálnoki was appointed manager of Területi Bajnokság Duna Group side Göd ahead of the second half of the 1984–85 season. After the club avoided relegation in its debut season in the Duna Group, he remained in charge as preparations for the following campaign began on 12 July 1985 in the Mátra Group.

=== Dunai Kőolaj ===
In August 1986, Dálnoki was appointed manager of Területi Bajnokság Duna Group club Dunai Kőolaj, replacing Róbert Pallagi, who had left the position.

=== Dömsöd ===
Dálnoki was appointed manager of recently relegated club Dömsöd in October 1987. At the end of the 1987–88 season, he led the club to the Pest Megyei Bajnokság I title after a 4–1 victory over Fót on 12 June 1988. He then guided Dömsöd to the quarter-finals of the 1988–89 Magyar Kupa, eliminating Nemzeti Bajnokság I autumn champions MTK in the fourth round and Békéscsaba in the round of 16 before the club was eliminated by Siófok.

=== ESMTK ===
Following his successful spell at Dömsöd, Dálnoki was appointed manager of Nemzeti Bajnokság III Duna Group club ESMTK on 5 July 1990. He led the club to the 1990–91 championship, as ESMTK won the title and finished as the highest-scoring team across all Hungarian league divisions.

=== Rákospalota ===
Dálnoki guided Nemzeti Bajnokság III Mátra Group club Rákospalota to the 1992–93 league title, which was secured with a victory over Törökszentmiklós on 20 June 1993. He left the club on 23 December during the first half of the following season in the Nemzeti Bajnokság II East Group, after which Imre Garaba was appointed as his successor.

=== Íris ===
Dálnoki was appointed manager of women's Nemzeti Bajnokság I club Íris for the 1995–96 season, replacing Pál Vass. He left the club after the first half of the 1997–98 season and was succeeded by Nikandish Hossein.

=== Kistarcsa ===
Dálnoki was appointed manager of Nemzeti Bajnokság III Duna Group club Kistarcsa in 1998, replacing Sándor Gujdár, who left to join Tiszakécske. It marked his second spell in charge of the club. He was dismissed later that year after the club fell short of its promotion ambitions.

=== Budakalász ===
On 3 July 1998, Dálnoki was appointed manager of Nemzeti Bajnokság III club Budakalász. Although the club exceeded its pre-season objective of avoiding relegation by remaining among the league's leading teams, he was dismissed in November.

== Career statistics ==
=== Club ===
Appearances and goals by club, season and league
| Club | Season | League | | |
| Club | Season | Division | Apps | Goals |
|---|---|---|---|---|
| Pesterzsébeti Vasas | 1954 | Nemzeti Bajnokság II | 24 | 0 |
| Ferencváros | 1957–58 | Nemzeti Bajnokság I | 16 | 3 |
| Ferencváros | 1958–59 | Nemzeti Bajnokság I | 9 | 0 |
| Ferencváros | 1959–60 | Nemzeti Bajnokság I | 6 | 0 |
| Ferencváros | Total | | 31 | 3 |
| Budapesti Spartacus | 1961–62 | Nemzeti Bajnokság II | 26 | 8 |
| Budapesti Spartacus | 1962–63 | Nemzeti Bajnokság II | 26 | 8 |
| Budapesti Spartacus | 1963 | Nemzeti Bajnokság III | 5 | 0 |
| Budapesti Spartacus | 1964 | Nemzeti Bajnokság III | 8 | 1 |
| Budapesti Spartacus | 1965 | Nemzeti Bajnokság III | 33 | 6 |
| Budapesti Spartacus | 1966 | Nemzeti Bajnokság III | 33 | 2 |
| Budapesti Spartacus | 1967 | Nemzeti Bajnokság II | 31 | 0 |
| Budapesti Spartacus | 1968 | Nemzeti Bajnokság II | 27 | 1 |
| Budapesti Spartacus | 1969 | Nemzeti Bajnokság II | 2 | 0 |
| Budapesti Spartacus | Total | | 191 | 26 |
| Career total | | | 246 | 29 |

=== Managerial ===
Managerial record by team and tenure
| Team | From | To | Record | | | | | | | | Ref |
| Team | From | To | P | W | D | L | GF | GA | GD | Win % | Ref |
|---|---|---|---|---|---|---|---|---|---|---|---|
| Rákospalota | 1992 | 23 December 1993 | 47 | 21 | 9 | 17 | 75 | 59 | +16 | 44.68 | |
| Íris | 1995 | 1998 | 42 | 27 | 4 | 11 | 115 | 46 | +69 | 64.29 | |
| Budakalász | 3 July 1998 | November 1998 | 14 | 7 | 3 | 4 | 25 | 15 | +10 | 50.00 | |
| ESMTK | 1999 | 2000 | 30 | 15 | 7 | 8 | 59 | 47 | +12 | 50.00 | |
| Total | | | 119 | 63 | 20 | 36 | 249 | 152 | +97 | 52.94 | |

== Honours ==
=== Player ===
Budapesti Spartacus

- Nemzeti Bajnokság III – East: 1966

=== Manager ===
Dömsöd

- Megyei Bajnokság I – Pest: 1987–88

ESMTK

- Nemzeti Bajnokság III – Duna: 1990–91

Rákospalota

- Nemzeti Bajnokság III – Mátra: 1992–93
