= 1967 Nemzeti Bajnokság III =

Nemzeti Bajnokság III
- Season: 1967
- Champions: Győri Dózsa SK (West); Nagybátonyi Bányász SC (Centre); Szolnoki MTE (East)
- Promoted: Győri Dózsa SK (West); Nagybátonyi Bányász SC (Centre); Szolnoki MTE (East)

The 1967 Nemzeti Bajnokság III season was the 1st edition of the Nemzeti Bajnokság III.

== League tables ==
=== Western group ===
Pos	Teams	Pld	W	D	L	GF	GA	GD	Pts	Promotion or relegation
1	Győri Dózsa SK	30	16	9	5	44	23	21	41	Promotion to Nemzeti Bajnokság II
2	Zalaegerszegi TE	30	16	4	10	56	48	8	36	
3	Veszprémi Vegyész SC	30	13	9	8	52	46	6	35	
4	Kaposvári Táncsis SE	30	14	6	10	58	48	10	34	
5	Szombathelyi Cipőgyár SE	30	14	5	11	57	35	22	33	
6	Nagykanizsai Bányász SK	30	13	7	10	51	48	3	33	
7	MÁV DAC	30	11	9	10	50	45	5	31	
8	Zalaegerszegi Dózsa SE	30	13	5	12	51	52	-1	31	
9	Pápai Textiles SE	30	12	6	12	41	44	-3	30	
10	Kaposvári Kinizsi	30	11	7	12	42	52	-10	29	
11	Pécsi Ércbányász SC	30	11	6	13	41	42	-1	28	
12	Máza-Szászvári Bányász	30	11	6	13	39	40	-1	28	
13	Pécsi VSK	30	11	5	14	49	51	-2	27	
14	Fűzfői AK	30	10	7	13	35	46	-11	27	Relegation to Megyei Bajnokság I
15	Dombóvári VSE	30	8	3	19	34	53	-19	19	Relegation to Megyei Bajnokság I
16	Soproni Textiles Club	30	8	2	20	36	63	-27	18	Relegation to Megyei Bajnokság I

=== Central group ===
Pos	Teams	Pld	W	D	L	GF	GA	GD	Pts	Promotion or relegation
1	Nagybátonyi Bányász SC	30	18	8	4	55	27	28	44	Promotion to Nemzeti Bajnokság II
2	III. kerületi TTVE	30	19	2	9	70	32	38	40	
3	Esztergomi Vasas SC	30	14	5	11	49	43	6	33	
4	Honvéd ETI SE	30	13	6	11	60	43	17	32	
5	Erzsébeti Vasas TK	30	10	12	8	43	35	8	32	
6	Almásfüzitői Timföldgyár SC	30	11	9	10	43	42	1	31	
7	Borsodi Bányász SK	30	10	10	10	36	42	-6	30	
8	Budapesti EAC	30	12	5	13	50	51	-1	29	
9	Székesfehérvári MÁV Előre SC	30	10	9	11	32	39	-7	29	
10	Salgótarjáni Kohász SE	30	9	10	11	34	36	-2	28	
11	Kisterenyei Bányász SE	30	12	4	14	39	43	-4	28	
12	Kazincbarcikai MTK	30	9	10	11	39	50	-11	28	
13	Ormósbányai Bányász SK	30	10	8	12	35	49	-14	28	
14	Vasas Izzó SK	30	9	9	12	45	43	2	27	Relegation to Megyei Bajnokság I
15	Sárisápi Bányász SE	30	8	5	17	38	62	-24	21	Relegation to Megyei Bajnokság I
16	Rudabányai Ércbányász SK	30	6	8	16	30	61	-31	20	Relegation to Megyei Bajnokság I

=== Eastern group ===
Pos	Teams	Pld	W	D	L	GF	GA	GD	Pts	Promotion or relegation
1	Szolnoki MTE	30	20	6	4	65	26	39	46	Promotion to Nemzeti Bajnokság II
2	Szegedi VSE	30	15	9	6	59	43	16	39	
3	Budai Spartacus SC	30	16	5	9	53	33	20	37	
4	Jászberényi Lehel SC	30	13	8	9	47	43	4	34	
5	Ceglédi VSE	30	13	7	10	63	40	23	33	
6	KISTEXT SK	30	13	6	11	55	36	19	32	
7	Szolnoki MÁV SE	30	10	10	10	52	38	14	30	
8	Kecskeméti TE	30	10	10	10	27	32	-5	30	
9	Pénzügyőr SE	30	13	3	14	57	54	3	29	
10	MGM Debrecen	30	10	9	11	39	45	-6	29	
11	Gyulai MEDOSZ	30	11	6	13	43	58	-15	28	
12	Kelenföldi Goldberger SE	30	11	5	14	44	56	-12	27	
13	Békéscsabai Előre SC	30	10	7	13	29	40	-11	27	
14	Kiskunfélegyházi Vasas TK	30	11	5	14	38	55	-17	27	
15	Mezőkovácsházi Petőfi SK	30	7	3	20	24	60	-36	17	Relegation to Megyei Bajnokság I
16	Martfűi MSE	30	6	3	21	28	64	-36	15	Relegation to Megyei Bajnokság I

== See also ==
- 1967 Magyar Kupa
- 1967 Nemzeti Bajnokság I
- 1967 Nemzeti Bajnokság II
