= 1975–76 Nemzeti Bajnokság III =

Nemzeti Bajnokság III
- Season: 1975–76
- Champions: NIKE Fűzfői AK (Northwest); Ganz-MÁVAG SE (Southwest); Egri Dózsa SE (Northeast); Szolnoki MÁV SE (Southeast)
- Promoted: NIKE Fűzfői AK (Northwest); Ganz-MÁVAG SE (Southwest); Székesfehérvári MÁV Előre SC (Southwest); Egri Dózsa SE (Northeast); Ózdi Kohász SE (Northeast); Szolnoki MÁV SE (Southeast)

The 1975–76 Nemzeti Bajnokság III season was the 1st edition of the Nemzeti Bajnokság III.

== League tables ==
=== Northwestern group ===
Pos	Teams	Pld	W	D	L	GF	GA	GD	Pts	Promotion or relegation
1	NIKE Fűzfői AK	36	26	6	4	68	17	51	58	Promotion to Nemzeti Bajnokság II
2	Váci Híradás SE	36	21	6	9	66	37	29	48	
3	Ajkai Alumínium SK	36	17	10	9	59	36	23	44	
4	Ajkai Bányász SK	36	20	4	12	63	51	12	44	
5	Körmendi Főiskola MTE	36	17	8	11	61	44	17	42	
6	Honvéd Rákóczi SE	36	15	8	13	56	42	14	38	
7	Bakony Vegyész TC	36	14	10	12	53	40	13	38	
8	Motim TE	36	12	12	12	61	50	11	36	
9	Dunakeszi VSE	36	14	8	14	41	47	-6	36	
10	Bauxitbányász SE	36	15	5	16	57	48	9	35	
11	AURAS SE	36	15	4	17	53	52	1	34	
12	Péti MTE	36	15	4	17	41	57	-16	34	
13	Soproni Közlekedési SE	36	12	10	14	34	41	-7	34	
14	Sabaria SE	36	13	7	16	58	58	0	33	
15	Répcelaki Bányász SK	36	14	5	17	49	52	-3	33	
16	Győri Textiles	36	10	13	13	39	54	-15	33	Relegation to Megyei Bajnokság I
17	Pápai Textiles	36	9	8	19	40	64	-24	26	Relegation to Megyei Bajnokság I
18	Soproni Textiles	36	8	8	20	33	66	-33	24	Relegation to Megyei Bajnokság I
19	Zalaegerszegi Dózsa	36	4	6	26	29	105	-76	14	Relegation to Megyei Bajnokság I

=== Southwestern group ===
Pos	Teams	Pld	W	D	L	GF	GA	GD	Pts	Promotion or relegation
1	Ganz-MÁVAG SE	36	24	7	5	87	34	53	55	Promotion to Nemzeti Bajnokság II
2	Székesfehérvári MÁV Előre SC	36	24	5	7	76	40	36	53	Promotion to Nemzeti Bajnokság II
3	BKV Előre SC	36	21	5	10	81	47	34	47	
4	Pénzügyőr SE	36	18	8	10	78	68	10	44	
5	Véméndi TSZ SK	36	18	7	11	85	63	22	43	
6	Siófoki Bányász SE	36	18	7	11	53	44	9	43	
7	Lőrinci Fonó	36	16	7	13	60	46	14	39	
8	Pécsi VSK	36	15	7	14	48	40	8	37	
9	EMG SK Sashalom	36	14	9	13	50	48	2	37	
10	Enyingi Medosz	36	13	8	15	46	62	-16	34	
11	Barcsi SC	36	14	5	17	38	62	-24	33	
12	Mázaszászvári Bányász	36	10	12	14	47	52	-5	32	
13	Bp. Építők	36	13	5	18	54	57	-3	31	
14	Perbáli TSZ SK	36	10	11	15	47	57	-10	31	
15	Dunaújvárosi Építők	36	8	12	16	42	56	-14	28	
16	Honvéd Táncsics SE	36	9	9	18	38	46	-8	27	Relegation to Megyei Bajnokság I
17	Dombóvári Spartacus	36	9	7	20	37	66	-29	25	Relegation to Megyei Bajnokság I
18	Pécsi BTC	36	9	6	21	41	80	-39	24	Relegation to Megyei Bajnokság I
19	MEDOSZ ERDÉRT SE	36	8	5	23	41	81	-40	21	Relegation to Megyei Bajnokság I
20	XV. ker. Növényolaj 1	0	0	0	0	0	0	0	0	Relegation to Megyei Bajnokság I

Notes:

1. withdrew

=== Northeastern group ===
Pos	Teams	Pld	W	D	L	GF	GA	GD	Pts	Promotion or relegation
1	Egri Dózsa SE	38	25	8	5	105	42	63	58	Promotion to Nemzeti Bajnokság II
2	Ózdi Kohász SE	38	20	11	7	61	23	38	51	Promotion to Nemzeti Bajnokság II
3	Debreceni MTE	38	17	14	7	80	41	39	48	
4	Gyöngyösi Spartacus	38	18	10	10	71	44	27	46	
5	Leninvárosi MTK	38	17	12	9	64	53	11	46	
6	Kazincbarcikai Vegyész SE	38	17	8	13	86	54	32	42	
7	Miskolci VSC	38	15	11	12	55	40	15	41	
8	Salgótarjáni Kohász SE	38	12	16	10	68	55	13	40	
9	Egri Vasas SC	38	17	6	15	66	60	6	40	
10	Sátoraljaújhelyi Spartacus Medosz MÁV	38	16	8	14	50	59	-9	40	
11	Nyíregyházi Spartacus Petőfi	38	15	9	14	63	48	15	39	
12	Balassagyarmati SE	38	15	9	14	63	58	5	39	
13	Borsodi Bányász	38	15	8	15	49	60	-11	38	
14	Rudabányai Ércbányász	38	11	13	14	54	68	-14	35	
15	Záhonyi VSC	38	14	7	17	49	76	-27	35	
16	Rakamazi Spartacus	38	10	11	17	42	55	-13	31	Relegation to Megyei Bajnokság I
17	Hejőcsabai Cement SE	38	10	7	21	49	79	-30	27	Relegation to Megyei Bajnokság I
18	Borsodi Volán	38	8	10	20	40	80	-40	26	Relegation to Megyei Bajnokság I
19	Hajdú Vasas	38	9	7	22	46	73	-27	25	Relegation to Megyei Bajnokság I
20	Balmazújvárosi TSZ SE	38	3	7	28	36	129	-93	13	Relegation to Megyei Bajnokság I

=== Southeastern group ===
Pos	Teams	Pld	W	D	L	GF	GA	GD	Pts	Promotion or relegation
1	Szolnoki MÁV SE	38	26	8	4	96	44	52	60	Promotion to Nemzeti Bajnokság II
2	Szarvasi Főiskola Spartacus	38	23	13	2	97	40	57	59	
3	Szegedi Dózsa	38	20	7	11	78	46	32	47	
4	Békéscsabai TASK	38	18	10	10	68	52	16	46	
5	Erzsébeti SMTK	38	18	7	13	91	59	32	43	
6	Kecskeméti TE	38	16	10	12	52	52	0	42	
7	Lehel SC	38	14	13	11	57	39	18	41	
8	Gyulai SE	38	15	11	12	55	48	7	41	
9	Jánoshalmai Spartacus	38	17	6	15	48	46	2	40	
10	Szegedi VSE	38	14	11	13	50	44	6	39	
11	ÉGSZÖV MEDOSZ SE	38	12	14	12	46	41	5	38	
12	Láng Vasas	38	14	8	16	46	52	-6	36	
13	Kecskeméti SC	38	12	10	16	59	61	-2	34	
14	ÉPGÉP SE	38	12	9	17	54	75	-21	33	
15	Honvéd Szabó Lajos SE	38	8	16	14	39	45	-6	32	
16	Kalocsai SE	38	10	9	19	54	83	-29	29	
17	HÓDGÉP Metripond SE	38	9	10	19	39	63	-24	28	Relegation to Megyei Bajnokság I
18	Orosházi MTK	38	10	7	21	38	69	-31	27	Relegation to Megyei Bajnokság I
19	Fővárosi Sütőipar	38	8	7	23	26	78	-52	23	Relegation to Megyei Bajnokság I
20	Tisza Cipő SE	38	10	2	26	37	93	-56	22	Relegation to Megyei Bajnokság I

== Promotion play-offs ==
Székesfehérvári MÁV Előre SC - Váci Híradás SE 5:2 (2:1)

Ózdi Kohász SE - Szarvasi Főiskola Spartacus 2:1 (1:1)

== Relegation play-offs ==
Participated only the 14th, 15th, and 16th placed teams from the Northwestern group.

Pos	Teams	W			L	GA	GF	Pts	
1.	Sabaria SE	2	2	0	0	4	1	4	Remained in the Nemzeti Bajnokság III
2.	Répcelaki Bányász SK	2	1	0	1	6	3	2	Remained in the Nemzeti Bajnokság III
3.	Győri Textiles	2	0	0	2	0	6	0	

== See also ==
- 1975–76 Magyar Kupa
- 1975–76 Nemzeti Bajnokság I
- 1975–76 Nemzeti Bajnokság II
