= 1974–75 Nemzeti Bajnokság III =

Nemzeti Bajnokság III
- Season: 1974–75
- Champions: KOMÉP SC Tatabánya (Northwest); Budapesti VSC (Southwest); Nagybátonyi Bányász SC (Northeast); Vasas Izzó (Southeast)
- Promoted: Bábolnai SE (Northwest); Budapesti VSC (Southwest); Nagybátonyi Bányász SC (Northeast); Vasas Izzó (Southeast)

The 1974–75 Nemzeti Bajnokság III season was the 1st edition of the Nemzeti Bajnokság III.

== League tables ==
=== Northwestern group ===
Pos	Teams	Pld	W	D	L	GF	GA	GD	Pts	Promotion or relegation
1	KOMÉP SC 1	36	21	9	6	68	41	27	51	Relegation to Megyei Bajnokság I
2	Bábolnai SE	36	20	10	6	72	37	35	50	Promotion to Nemzeti Bajnokság II
3	Váci Híradás SE	36	14	14	8	61	43	18	42	
4	Sabaria SE	36	18	5	13	57	47	10	41	
5	Motim TE	36	15	9	12	61	58	3	39	
6	NIKE Fűzfői AK	36	15	8	13	60	53	7	38	
7	Dunakeszi VSE	36	13	11	12	45	45	0	37	
8	Bauxitbányász SE	36	14	9	13	38	45	-7	37	
9	Soproni VSE	36	13	10	13	45	46	-1	36	
10	Körmendi FMTE	36	14	7	15	50	43	7	35	
11	Ajkai Alumínium SK	36	11	13	12	50	49	1	35	
12	Pápai Textiles SE	36	14	7	15	50	58	-8	35	
13	Bakony Vegyész TC	36	13	8	15	39	40	-1	34	
14	AURAS SE	36	11	11	14	54	67	-13	33	
15	Péti MTE	36	10	12	14	51	49	2	32	
16	Soproni Textiles SE	36	12	8	16	49	57	-8	32	
17	Esztergomi MIM Vasas	36	8	14	14	34	45	-11	30	Relegation to Megyei Bajnokság I
18	Győri Dózsa SE	36	11	8	17	48	61	-13	30	Relegation to Megyei Bajnokság I
19	Győri Elektromos	36	5	7	24	42	90	-48	17	Relegation to Megyei Bajnokság I
20	Szombathelyi SE Dózsa 2	0	0	0	0	0	0	0	0	Relegation to Megyei Bajnokság I

=== Southwestern group ===
Pos	Teams	Pld	W	D	L	GF	GA	GD	Pts	Promotion or relegation
1	Budapesti VSC	38	24	8	6	86	30	56	56	Promotion to Nemzeti Bajnokság II
2	Pécsi VSK	38	21	11	6	72	36	36	53	
3	BKV Előre SC	38	19	12	7	65	37	28	50	
4	Dunaújvárosi Építők	38	19	7	12	63	49	14	45	
5	Székesfehérvári MÁV Előre SC	38	15	14	9	59	49	10	44	
6	Véméndi TSZ SK	38	16	11	11	54	51	3	42	
7	Pénzügyőr SE	38	17	8	13	72	44	28	42	
8	Budapesti Építők	38	13	14	11	50	46	4	40	
9	Honvéd Táncsics SE	38	16	7	15	55	61	-6	39	
10	Siófoki Bányász	38	12	13	13	46	50	-4	37	
11	Mázaszászvár Bányász	38	13	10	15	68	61	7	36	
12	EMG SK Sashalom	38	14	7	17	51	68	-17	35	
13	Növényolaj Kinizsi	38	12	10	16	52	64	-12	34	
14	Lőrinci Fonó	38	14	6	18	50	71	-21	34	
15	ERDÉRT MEDOSZ SE	38	11	11	16	74	84	-10	33	
16	Április 4. Vasas	38	13	7	18	47	60	-13	33	Relegation to Megyei Bajnokság I
17	Szigetvári VSZ SE	38	11	7	20	47	66	-19	29	Relegation to Megyei Bajnokság I
18	Törekvés SE	38	10	8	20	37	60	-23	28	Relegation to Megyei Bajnokság I
19	III. Kerületi TTVE	38	11	3	24	50	81	-31	25	Relegation to Megyei Bajnokság I
20	Kaposvári Vasas	38	7	10	21	45	75	-30	24	Relegation to Megyei Bajnokság I

=== Northeastern group ===
Pos	Teams	Pld	W	D	L	GF	GA	GD	Pts	Promotion or relegation
1	Nagybátonyi Bányász SC	38	21	11	6	76	35	41	53	Promotion to Nemzeti Bajnokság II
2	Debreceni MTE	38	20	9	9	72	53	19	49	
3	Nyíregyházi Spartacus Petőfi	38	20	8	10	76	44	32	48	
4	Gyöngyösi Spartacus	38	20	7	11	67	41	26	47	
5	Miskolci VSC	38	19	8	11	82	49	33	46	
6	Kazincbarcikai Vegyész SE	38	18	9	11	75	51	24	45	
7	Lehel SC	38	19	6	13	60	48	12	44	
8	Rudabányai Ércbányász	38	13	16	9	52	45	7	42	
9	Hajdú Vasas	38	16	8	14	55	64	-9	40	
10	Leninvárosi MTK	38	13	13	12	49	37	12	39	
11	Salgótarjáni Kohász SE	38	13	11	14	65	65	0	37	
12	Sátoraljaújhelyi Spartacus Medosz MÁV	38	14	9	15	39	46	-7	37	
13	Záhonyi VSC	38	16	5	17	58	66	-8	37	
14	Borsodi Bányász	38	14	8	16	60	63	-3	36	
15	Borsodi Volán	38	9	16	13	50	67	-17	34	
16	Kisvárdai SE	38	12	8	18	66	66	0	32	Relegation to Megyei Bajnokság I
17	Kisterenyei Bányász Építők	38	10	10	18	49	68	-19	30	Relegation to Megyei Bajnokság I
18	Hajdúböszörményi Bocskai	38	10	7	21	41	70	-29	27	Relegation to Megyei Bajnokság I
19	Tuzséri Medosz Erdért	38	8	4	26	46	94	-48	20	Relegation to Megyei Bajnokság I
20	Debreceni EAC	38	5	7	26	47	113	-66	17	Relegation to Megyei Bajnokság I

=== Southeastern group ===
Pos	Teams	Pld	W	D	L	GF	GA	GD	Pts	Promotion or relegation
1	Vasas Izzó	38	25	10	3	83	22	61	60	Promotion to Nemzeti Bajnokság II
2	Kecskeméti SC	38	23	9	6	63	29	34	55	
3	Szolnoki MÁV	38	24	5	9	99	43	56	53	
4	Szarvasi Főiskola Spartacus	38	18	13	7	60	42	18	49	
5	Békéscsabai TASK	38	22	4	12	71	60	11	48	
6	Szegedi VSE	38	16	9	13	50	42	8	41	
7	Szegedi Dózsa	38	18	4	16	67	49	18	40	
8	ÉGSZÖV MEDOSZ	38	12	15	11	54	42	12	39	
9	Honvéd Szabó Lajos SE	38	13	12	13	44	43	1	38	
10	ÉPGÉP SE	38	11	14	13	52	57	-5	36	
11	Kecskeméti TE	38	13	9	16	53	55	-2	35	
12	Láng Vasas SK	38	13	8	17	53	60	-7	34	
13	Jánoshalmi Spartacus	38	13	8	17	45	55	-10	34	
14	Gyulai SE	38	13	8	17	50	69	-19	34	
15	ESMTK	38	13	7	18	62	70	-8	33	
16	Ceglédi VSE	38	9	14	15	51	67	-16	32	Relegation to Megyei Bajnokság I
17	KELTEX	38	9	13	16	44	63	-19	31	Relegation to Megyei Bajnokság I
18	Honvéd Mezőfi István SE	38	9	10	19	28	58	-30	28	Relegation to Megyei Bajnokság I
19	Kiskunhalasi Medosz	38	8	8	22	36	78	-42	24	Relegation to Megyei Bajnokság I
20	Honvéd Kilián György Főiskola SE	38	5	6	27	32	93	-61	16	Relegation to Megyei Bajnokság I

== See also ==
- 1974–75 Magyar Kupa
- 1974–75 Nemzeti Bajnokság I
- 1974–75 Nemzeti Bajnokság II
