= 1966 Nemzeti Bajnokság III =

Nemzeti Bajnokság III
- Season: 1966
- Champions: Várpalotai Bányász SK (West); Budapesti Spartacus SC (East)
- Promoted: Várpalotai Bányász SK (West); Fővárosi Autóbusz SK (West); Pécsi Bányász SE (West); Budapesti Spartacus SC (East); Kecskeméti Dózsa SC (East); Budapesti Előre SC (East)

The 1966 Nemzeti Bajnokság III season was the 1st edition of the Nemzeti Bajnokság III.

== League tables ==
=== Western group ===
Pos	Teams	Pld	W	D	L	GF	GA	GD	Pts	Promotion or relegation
1	Várpalotai Bányász SK	34	23	5	6	79	34	45	51	Promotion to Nemzeti Bajnokság II
2	Fővárosi Autóbusz SK	34	20	7	7	65	29	36	47	Promotion to Nemzeti Bajnokság II
3	Pécsi Bányász SE	34	18	10	6	61	37	24	46	Promotion to Nemzeti Bajnokság II
4	Pécsi VSK	34	20	5	9	68	37	31	45	
5	Zalaegerszegi TE	34	19	5	10	71	35	36	43	
6	Esztergomi MIM Vasas	34	14	12	8	56	30	26	40	
7	Budai Spartacus SC	34	11	16	7	54	42	12	38	
8	Győri Dózsa SK	34	14	8	12	50	42	8	36	
9	Vasas Izzó SK	34	15	6	13	48	49	-1	36	
10	Székesfehérvári MÁV Előre SC	34	11	13	10	36	42	-6	35	
11	Dombóvári VSE	34	12	9	13	40	51	-11	33	
12	Zalaegerszegi Dózsa SE	34	11	9	14	42	51	-9	31	
13	Soproni Textiles Club	34	11	7	16	48	52	-4	29	
14	III. Kerületi TTVE	34	10	7	17	49	65	-16	27	
15	Veszprémi Haladás-Petőfi SC	34	10	4	20	43	68	-25	24	
16	Kaposvári Kinizsi	34	7	10	17	35	60	-25	24	
17	Pápai Textiles SE	34	6	8	20	35	68	-33	20	
18	Mosonmagyaróvári TE	34	1	5	28	30	118	-88	7	Relegation to Megyei Bajnokság I

=== Eastern group ===
Pos	Teams	Pld	W	D	L	GF	GA	GD	Pts	Promotion or relegation
1	Budapesti Spartacus SC	34	20	7	7	48	29	19	47	Promotion to Nemzeti Bajnokság II
2	Kecskeméti Dózsa	34	18	10	6	70	29	41	46	Promotion to Nemzeti Bajnokság II
3	Budapesti Előre SC	34	17	12	5	67	32	35	46	Promotion to Nemzeti Bajnokság II
4	Szolnoki MÁV SE	34	19	8	7	68	42	26	46	
5	Nagybátonyi Bányász SC	34	16	7	11	49	42	7	39	
6	Békéscsabai Előre SC	34	14	9	11	49	45	4	37	
7	Borsodi Bányász SK	34	11	12	11	49	39	10	34	
8	Pénzügyőr SE	34	13	8	13	59	51	8	34	
9	Szegedi VSE	34	13	6	15	49	58	-9	32	
10	KISTEXT SK	34	10	11	13	47	59	-12	31	
11	Salgótarjáni Kohász SE	34	11	8	15	40	49	-9	30	
12	Szolnoki MTE	34	10	9	15	45	54	-9	29	
13	Gyulai MEDOSZ SE	34	12	5	17	50	68	-18	29	
14	Ceglédi VSE	34	11	6	17	63	65	-2	28	
15	MGM Debrecen	34	9	10	15	48	60	-12	28	
16	Kiskunfélegyházi Vasas	34	10	7	17	44	79	-35	27	
17	Jászberényi Lehel SC	34	10	6	18	35	54	-19	26	
18	Miskolci Bányász	34	7	9	18	44	69	-25	23	Relegation to Megyei Bajnokság I

== See also ==
- 1966 Magyar Kupa
- 1966 Nemzeti Bajnokság I
- 1966 Nemzeti Bajnokság II
