= 1961–62 Nemzeti Bajnokság III =

Nemzeti Bajnokság III
- Season: 1961–62
- Champions: MÁV-DAC (Northwest); Pécsi VSK (Southwest); Salgótarjáni Kohász SE (North); Csepel Autó SE (North-centre); Egri Dózsa SE (Northeast); Szegedi VSE (Southeast)
- Promoted: MÁV-DAC (Northwest); Pécsi VSK (Southwest); Salgótarjáni Kohász SE (North); Csepel Autó SE (North-centre); Szegedi VSE (Southeast)

The 1961–62 Nemzeti Bajnokság III season was the 12th edition of the Nemzeti Bajnokság III.

== League tables ==
=== Northwestern group ===
Pos	Teams	Pld	W	D	L	GF	GA	GD	Pts	Promotion or relegation
1	MÁV-DAC	30	18	8	4	79	27	52	44	Promotion to Nemzeti Bajnokság II
2	Pápai Textiles SE	30	18	7	5	56	16	40	43	
3	Győri Dózsa SE	30	18	6	6	64	29	35	42	
4	Keszthelyi Előre Petőfi	30	16	8	6	48	34	14	40	
5	Veszprémi Vasas TC	30	17	5	8	69	33	36	39	
6	Nagykanizsai Dózsa	30	15	7	8	44	37	7	37	
7	Mosoni Vasas	30	14	2	14	37	42	-5	30	
8	Szombathelyi Vasas	30	9	11	10	40	34	6	29	
9	Szombathelyi Cipőgyár SE	30	9	11	10	40	38	2	29	
10	Várpalotai Bányász SK	30	9	9	12	38	37	1	27	
11	Nagykanizsai Bányász	30	8	10	12	43	56	-13	26	
12	Szombathelyi Pamutipar	30	7	9	14	42	54	-12	23	
13	Balinkai Bányász	30	7	9	14	31	54	-23	23	Relegation to Megyei Bajnokság I
14	Soproni SOTEX	30	9	3	18	25	60	-35	21	Relegation to Megyei Bajnokság I
15	Ácsi Kinizsi	30	3	8	19	27	80	-53	14	Relegation to Megyei Bajnokság I
16	Celldömölki Vasutas SE	30	4	5	21	29	81	-52	13	Relegation to Megyei Bajnokság I

=== Southwestern group ===
Pos	Teams	Pld	W	D	L	GF	GA	GD	Pts	Promotion or relegation
1	Pécsi VSK	30	19	6	5	68	25	43	44	Promotion to Nemzeti Bajnokság II
2	Pécsi BTC	30	18	6	6	66	32	34	42	
3	Székesfehérvári MÁV Előre SC	30	17	7	6	65	39	26	41	
4	Bajai Építők	30	12	10	8	40	29	11	34	
5	Pécsi Bányász	30	13	7	10	61	40	21	33	
6	Mohácsi TE	30	11	11	8	47	43	4	33	
7	Kiskunhalasi MEDOSZ	30	13	7	10	40	38	2	33	
8	Szekszárdi Dózsa SE	30	9	11	10	44	45	-1	29	
9	Siófoki MÁV Olajbányász	30	9	10	11	45	49	-4	28	
10	Dombóvári Vasutas SE	30	11	5	14	49	60	-11	27	
11	Szekszárdi Petőfi	30	9	9	12	37	52	-15	27	
12	Ercsi Kinizsi	30	9	8	13	36	48	-12	26	
13	Kaposvári MTE	30	10	6	14	35	56	-21	26	Relegation to Megyei Bajnokság I
14	Bajai Bácska Posztó	30	10	2	18	30	56	-26	22	Relegation to Megyei Bajnokság I
15	Kaposvári Dózsa	30	5	8	17	35	59	-24	18	Relegation to Megyei Bajnokság I
16	Pécsi Vasas	30	5	7	18	27	54	-27	17	Relegation to Megyei Bajnokság I

=== Northern group ===
Pos	Teams	Pld	W	D	L	GF	GA	GD	Pts	Promotion or relegation
1	Salgótarjáni Kohász SE	30	22	4	4	68	34	34	48	Promotion to Nemzeti Bajnokság II
2	Nagybátonyi Bányász SC	30	17	8	5	58	35	23	42	
3	Baglyasaljai Bányász	30	17	6	7	55	26	29	40	
4	Vasas Ikarus SK	30	15	8	7	55	41	14	38	
5	Sashalmi Elektronikus	30	13	7	10	43	34	9	33	
6	Chinoin SC	30	11	7	12	56	47	9	29	
7	Petőfibányai Bányász	30	13	3	14	58	49	9	29	
8	Kartali MEDOSZ	30	10	9	11	47	47	0	29	
9	Hajógyár	30	11	7	12	50	54	-4	29	
10	Kisterenyei Bányász	30	8	10	12	37	61	-24	26	
11	Váci Vasas	30	9	7	14	44	52	-8	25	
12	Vasas Dinamó	30	9	7	14	33	42	-9	25	
13	Kazári Bányász	30	8	9	13	36	50	-14	25	Relegation to Megyei Bajnokság I
14	Gázművek MTE	30	7	10	13	43	57	-14	24	Relegation to Megyei Bajnokság I
15	Salgótarjáni Zománc	30	6	8	16	48	68	-20	20	Relegation to Megyei Bajnokság I
16	Vasas Kábel	30	6	6	18	31	65	-34	18	Relegation to Megyei Bajnokság I

=== Northcentral group ===
Pos	Teams	Pld	W	D	L	GF	GA	GD	Pts	Promotion or relegation
1	Csepel Autó SE	30	18	8	4	55	27	28	44	Promotion to Nemzeti Bajnokság II
2	Szentendrei Honvéd	30	16	5	9	58	35	23	37	
3	Esztergomi Vasas	30	15	6	9	56	37	19	36	
4	Tokodi Bányász	30	11	13	6	46	36	10	35	
5	Nyergesújfalui Viscosa	30	14	7	9	42	33	9	35	
6	III. kerület TTVE	30	12	10	8	70	42	28	34	
7	Sárisápi Bányász	30	15	4	11	52	41	11	34	
8	Pilisi Bányász	30	12	9	9	42	33	9	33	
9	Elektromos SE	30	12	8	10	51	45	6	32	
10	Újlaki FC	30	9	12	9	39	46	-7	30	
11	Vasas Izzó	30	11	5	14	42	50	-8	27	
12	Annavölgyi Bányász	30	10	6	14	47	57	-10	26	
13	Törekvés SE	30	9	6	15	39	61	-22	24	Relegation to Megyei Bajnokság I
14	Nagytétényi Kohász SE	30	6	7	17	37	60	-23	19	Relegation to Megyei Bajnokság I
15	Olimposz Petőfi	30	5	8	17	33	61	-28	18	Relegation to Megyei Bajnokság I
16	Csillaghegyi MTE	30	6	4	20	24	69	-45	16	Relegation to Megyei Bajnokság I

=== Northeastern group ===
Pos	Teams	Pld	W	D	L	GF	GA	GD	Pts	Promotion or relegation
1	Egri Dózsa SE	30	22	5	3	74	34	40	49	
2	Miskolci Bányász	30	20	4	6	68	29	39	44	
3	Nyíregyházi MTE	30	12	9	9	49	35	14	33	
4	Egercsehi Bányász	30	13	6	11	50	46	4	32	
5	Somsályi Bányász	30	12	7	11	49	42	7	31	
6	Rudabányai Bányász	30	12	6	12	52	42	10	30	
7	Miskolci MTE	30	13	4	13	43	45	-2	30	
8	Debreceni Gördülőcsapágy-gyár	30	12	5	13	48	41	7	29	
9	Kazincbarcikai MTK	30	11	7	12	37	45	-8	29	
10	Gyöngyösi Spartacus	30	9	11	10	37	46	-9	29	
11	Kisvárdai Vasas	30	12	4	14	32	48	-16	28	
12	Hajdúszoboszlói Spartacus	30	11	5	14	45	54	-9	27	
13	Budapesti Tűzoltók	30	9	8	13	44	42	2	26	Relegation to Megyei Bajnokság I
14	Debreceni Kinizsi	30	11	4	15	43	54	-11	26	Relegation to Megyei Bajnokság I
15	Debreceni Honvéd	30	9	5	16	31	49	-18	23	Relegation to Megyei Bajnokság I
16	Tiszalöki Vörös Meteor	30	5	4	21	25	75	-50	14	Relegation to Megyei Bajnokság I

=== Southeastern group ===
Pos	Teams	Pld	W	D	L	GF	GA	GD	Pts	Promotion or relegation
1	Szegedi VSE	30	22	1	7	77	36	41	45	Promotion to Nemzeti Bajnokság II
2	Békéscsabai Építők	30	16	9	5	63	26	37	41	
3	Szolnoki MTE	30	16	8	6	62	32	30	40	
4	Gyulai MEDOSZ	30	16	6	8	62	33	29	38	
5	Jászberényi Vasas	30	16	5	9	58	32	26	37	
6	Jászberényi Lehel	30	14	7	9	58	40	18	35	
7	Hódmezővásárhelyi MEDOSZ	30	13	6	11	52	43	9	32	
8	Csongrádi Petőfi SC	30	11	9	10	56	52	4	31	
9	Martfűi MSE	30	10	9	11	55	47	8	29	
10	Kecskeméti TE	30	10	8	12	51	49	2	28	
11	Szarvasi SC	30	11	4	15	45	65	-20	26	
12	Orosházi Kinizsi SE	30	9	7	14	47	60	-13	25	
13	Békéscsabai MÁV Bocskai	30	8	7	15	38	67	-29	23	Relegation to Megyei Bajnokság I
14	Szolnoki Kinizsi	30	6	6	18	41	80	-39	18	Relegation to Megyei Bajnokság I
15	Szentesi Kinizsi	30	7	4	19	32	74	-42	18	Relegation to Megyei Bajnokság I
16	Szegedi Spartacus	30	6	2	22	28	89	-61	14	Relegation to Megyei Bajnokság I

== See also ==
- 1961–62 Nemzeti Bajnokság I
- 1961–62 Nemzeti Bajnokság II
