= 1962–63 Nemzeti Bajnokság III =

Nemzeti Bajnokság III
- Season: 1962–63
- Champions: Győri Dózsa SE (Northwest); Pécsi BTC (Southwest); Nagybátonyi Bányász SC (North); Vörös Csillag Traktorgyár (North-centre); Miskolci Bányász (Northeast); Szolnoki MTE (Southeast)
- Promoted: Szolnoki MTE (Southeast); Gyulai MEDOSZ (Southeast); Jászberényi Lehel SC (Southeast); Békéscsabai Előre SC (Southeast)

The 1962–63 Nemzeti Bajnokság III season was the 1st edition of the Nemzeti Bajnokság III.

== League tables ==
=== Northwestern group ===
Pos	Teams	Pld	W	D	L	GF	GA	GD	Pts	Promotion or relegation
1	Győri Dózsa SE	30	21	4	5	54	23	31	46	No promotion or relegation
2	Veszprémi Haladás-Petőfi	30	19	6	5	65	34	31	44	No promotion or relegation
3	Pápai Textiles SE	30	19	3	8	57	28	29	41	No promotion or relegation
4	Zalaegerszegi Dózsa	30	17	6	7	78	33	45	40	No promotion or relegation
5	Várpalotai Bányász SK	30	14	10	6	62	37	25	38	No promotion or relegation
6	Veszprémi Vasas	30	16	5	9	52	36	16	37	No promotion or relegation
7	Szombathelyi Cipőgyár	30	12	4	14	50	46	4	28	No promotion or relegation
8	Mosoni Vasas	30	9	10	11	50	47	3	28	No promotion or relegation
9	Keszthelyi Haladás Petőfi	30	11	6	13	36	42	-6	28	No promotion or relegation
10	Soproni VSE	30	11	4	15	34	55	-21	26	No promotion or relegation
11	Szombathelyi Vasas	30	9	6	15	43	52	-9	24	No promotion or relegation
12	Székesfehérvári Honvéd	30	7	10	13	31	53	-22	24	No promotion or relegation
13	Komáromi MÁV Textiles	30	9	5	16	25	47	-22	23	No promotion or relegation
14	Győri Szerszámgépgyár	30	8	6	16	39	56	-17	22	No promotion or relegation
15	Szombathelyi Pamutipar	30	8	1	21	29	70	-41	17	No promotion or relegation
16	Szombathelyi Dózsa	30	2	10	18	28	74	-46	14	No promotion or relegation

=== Southwestern group ===
Pos	Teams	Pld	W	D	L	GF	GA	GD	Pts	Promotion or relegation
1	Pécsi BTC	30	21	5	4	87	43	44	47	No promotion or relegation
2	Kaposvári Honvéd SE	30	18	7	5	80	27	53	43	No promotion or relegation
3	Pécsi Bányász	30	16	11	3	59	31	28	48	No promotion or relegation
4	Székesfehérvári MÁV Előre SC	30	17	8	5	46	28	18	42	No promotion or relegation
5	Szekszárdi Dózsa SE	30	13	5	12	62	52	10	31	No promotion or relegation
6	Nagykanizsai Bányász	30	12	6	12	49	43	6	30	No promotion or relegation
7	Bajai Építők	30	10	8	12	36	43	-7	28	No promotion or relegation
8	Mohácsi Petőfi	30	11	5	14	37	49	-12	27	No promotion or relegation
9	Nagymányoki Bányász	30	12	3	15	43	61	-18	27	No promotion or relegation
10	Kalocsai Kinizsi	30	10	6	14	56	73	-17	26	No promotion or relegation
11	Pécsszabolcsi Bányász	30	8	9	13	42	48	-6	25	No promotion or relegation
12	Siófoki Bányász FC	30	9	6	15	43	58	-15	24	No promotion or relegation
13	Szekszárdi Petőfi	30	9	6	15	32	55	-23	24	No promotion or relegation
14	Kiskunhalasi Medosz	30	8	7	15	34	54	-20	23	No promotion or relegation
15	Nagykanizsai Dózsa	30	7	8	15	47	56	-9	22	No promotion or relegation
16	Dombóvári VSE	30	8	2	20	32	64	-32	18	No promotion or relegation

=== Northern group ===
Pos	Teams	Pld	W	D	L	GF	GA	GD	Pts	Promotion or relegation
1	Nagybátonyi Bányász	30	21	4	5	63	22	41	46	No promotion or relegation
2	KISTEXT SK	30	17	9	4	51	26	25	44	No promotion or relegation
3	Kisterenyei Bányász	30	15	11	4	57	32	25	41	No promotion or relegation
4	Baglyasaljai Bányász	30	16	8	6	47	23	24	40	No promotion or relegation
5	Vasas Ikarus SK	30	16	7	7	58	35	23	39	No promotion or relegation
6	Tehertaxi Szállítók	30	15	8	7	57	32	25	38	No promotion or relegation
7	Váci Vasas	30	9	12	9	41	43	-2	32	No promotion or relegation
8	Petőfibányai Bányász	30	9	10	11	39	45	-6	28	No promotion or relegation
9	Statisztika Petőfi	30	12	4	14	47	56	-9	28	No promotion or relegation
10	Autótaxi	30	9	7	14	57	73	-16	25	No promotion or relegation
11	Sashalmi Elektronikus	30	9	5	16	41	50	-9	23	No promotion or relegation
12	Hajógyár	30	5	12	13	41	55	-14	22	No promotion or relegation
13	Zagyvapálfalvi Építők	30	10	2	18	29	58	-29	22	No promotion or relegation
14	Chinoin	30	5	10	15	41	53	-12	20	No promotion or relegation
15	Kartali Medosz	30	6	8	16	30	50	-20	20	No promotion or relegation
16	Vasas Dinamó	30	4	7	19	23	69	-46	15	No promotion or relegation

=== Northcentral group ===
Pos	Teams	Pld	W	D	L	GF	GA	GD	Pts	Promotion or relegation
1	Vörös Csillag Traktorgyár	30	18	8	4	70	31	39	44	No promotion or relegation
2	Izzó	30	15	7	8	48	31	17	37	No promotion or relegation
3	III. Kerületi TTVE	30	15	7	8	44	33	11	37	No promotion or relegation
4	Esztergomi Vasas	30	12	11	7	51	31	20	35	No promotion or relegation
5	Pénzügyőrök	30	14	5	11	50	37	13	33	No promotion or relegation
6	Elektromos	30	9	14	7	48	45	3	32	No promotion or relegation
7	Ercsi Kinizsi	30	11	7	12	46	41	5	29	No promotion or relegation
8	Tokodi Bányász	30	9	11	10	30	33	-3	29	No promotion or relegation
9	Szigetszentmiklósi TK	30	9	9	12	37	51	-14	27	No promotion or relegation
10	Újlaki FC	30	8	10	12	40	53	-13	26	No promotion or relegation
11	Annavölgyi Bányász	30	11	4	15	45	72	-27	26	No promotion or relegation
12	Pilisi Bányász	30	9	8	13	31	51	-20	26	No promotion or relegation
13	Szentendrei Honvéd	30	12	1	17	50	55	-5	25	No promotion or relegation
14	Sárisápi Bányász	30	10	5	15	36	43	-7	25	No promotion or relegation
15	Kerámia	30	7	10	13	35	41	-6	24	No promotion or relegation
16	Nyergesújfalui Viscosa 1	30	9	7	14	30	43	-13	23	No promotion or relegation

Note:

1. 2 points deducted

=== Northeastern group ===
Pos	Teams	Pld	W	D	L	GF	GA	GD	Pts	Promotion or relegation
1	Miskolci Bányász	30	22	8	5	70	36	34	47	No promotion or relegation
2	Nyíregyházi MTE	30	15	9	6	46	28	18	39	No promotion or relegation
3	Fővárosi Autóbusz	30	13	11	6	51	36	15	37	No promotion or relegation
4	Debreceni Dózsa	30	13	10	7	48	33	15	36	No promotion or relegation
5	Egercsehi Bányász	30	14	4	12	65	45	20	32	No promotion or relegation
6	Kazincbarcikai MTK	30	10	11	9	44	34	10	31	No promotion or relegation
7	Debreceni Gördülőcsapágygyár	30	8	14	8	47	33	14	30	No promotion or relegation
8	Rudabányai Bányász	30	10	10	10	42	42	0	30	No promotion or relegation
9	Egri Honvéd	30	9	10	11	44	50	-6	28	No promotion or relegation
10	Nagykállói Medosz	30	10	6	14	40	53	-13	26	No promotion or relegation
11	Hajdúszoboszlói Spartacus	30	9	7	14	42	58	-16	25	No promotion or relegation
12	Kisvárdai Vasas	30	11	3	16	31	54	-23	25	No promotion or relegation
13	Szuhavölgyi Bányász	30	9	6	15	38	48	-10	24	No promotion or relegation
14	Somsályi Bányász	30	9	6	15	38	58	-20	24	No promotion or relegation
15	Miskolci MTE	30	9	5	16	45	61	-16	23	No promotion or relegation
16	Gyöngyösi Spartacus	30	8	7	15	41	63	-22	23	No promotion or relegation

=== Southeastern group ===
Pos	Teams	Pld	W	D	L	GF	GA	GD	Pts	Promotion or relegation
1	Szolnoki MTE	30	20	6	4	55	19	36	46	Promotion to Nemzeti Bajnokság II
2	Gyulai Medosz	30	20	5	5	79	32	47	45	Promotion to Nemzeti Bajnokság II
3	Jászberényi Lehel	30	13	8	9	52	36	16	34	Promotion to Nemzeti Bajnokság II
4	Békéscsabai Előre	30	13	8	9	53	48	5	34	Promotion to Nemzeti Bajnokság II
5	Martfűi MSE	30	15	2	13	65	54	11	32	
6	Jászberényi Vasas	30	11	10	9	34	31	3	32	
7	Kecskeméti TE	30	13	3	14	35	34	1	29	
8	Mezőhegyesi Medosz	30	11	7	12	43	45	-2	29	
9	Szegedi Építők	30	8	12	10	38	38	0	28	
10	Hódmezővásárhelyi Medosz	30	11	6	13	50	56	-6	28	
11	Törökszentmiklósi Vasas	30	12	4	14	30	56	-26	28	
12	Csongrádi Petőfi	30	11	5	14	43	47	-4	27	
13	Orosházi Kinizsi	30	9	9	12	26	40	-14	27	
14	Makói Vasas	30	6	12	12	35	49	-14	24	
15	Ceglédi VSE	30	8	7	15	37	48	-11	23	Relegation to Megyei Bajnokság I
16	Szarvasi Spartacus	30	3	8	19	19	61	-42	14	Relegation to Megyei Bajnokság I

== Relegation play-offs ==
=== Group 1 ===
Pos	Team	Pld	W	D	L	GF	GA	Pts
1	Gyöngyösi Spartacus	2	1	1	0	4	1	3
2	Vasas Dinamó	2	0	2	0	4	4	2
3	Szarvasi Spartacus	2	0	1	1	3	6	1

=== Group 2 ===
Pos	Team	Pld	W	D	L	GF	GA	Pts
1	Dombóvári Vasutas SE	2	1	1	0	9	3	3
2	Nyergesújfalusi Viscosa	2	1	1	0	6	3	3
3	Szombathelyi Dózsa	2	0	0	2	0	9	0

== See also ==
- 1962–63 Magyar Kupa
- 1962–63 Nemzeti Bajnokság I
- 1962–63 Nemzeti Bajnokság II
