= 1967–68 OB I bajnoksag season =

Hungarian ice hockey season

The 1967–68 OB I bajnokság season was the 31st season of the OB I bajnokság, the top level of ice hockey in Hungary. Eight teams participated in the league, and Ujpesti Dozsa SC won the championship.

== Regular season ==
	Club	GP	W	T	L	Goals	Pts
1.	Újpesti Dózsa SC	14	12	1	1	123:33	25
2.	Ferencvárosi TC	14	11	1	2	106:35	23
3.	BVSC Budapest	14	10	2	2	97:35	22
4.	Vörös Meteor Budapest	14	8	1	5	63:47	17
5.	Elõre Budapest	14	5	0	9	43:87	10
6.	Építõk Budapest	14	2	3	9	36:75	7
7.	Postás Budapest	14	3	1	10	32:96	7
8.	Spartacus Budapest	14	0	1	13	34:126	1
