= Tatabányai Építők SK =

Hungarian football club

- Full name: Tatabányai Építők Sport Klub
- Founded: 1937
- Dissolved: 1991
Home colours

Tatabányai Építők SK or KOMÉP SC Tatabánya is a defunct professional football club based in Tatabánya, Hungary.

== History ==
Tatabányai Építők SK won the 1974–75 Nemzeti Bajnokság III, as KOMÉP SC, although the club did not gain promotion to the second division. The club was suspended from the national championship due to bribery. Therefore, the second placed team, Bábolnai SE, were promoted to the 1975–76 Nemzeti Bajnokság II season.

== Name changes ==
- Felsőgallai Levente Egyesület: ? – 1945
- Felsőgallai Ipartelepek MÁV (FIMÁV): 1945 – 1948
- Tatabányai Ipartelepek SE (TISE): 1948 – 1949
- Tatabányai MÉMOSZ: 1949 – 1950
- Tatabányai Építők SK: 1950 – 1969
- Tatabányai MÁV Építők: 1957 – 1960
- Tatabányai Építők SK: 1960 – 1969
- KOMÉP SC Tatabánya: 1969 – 1989
- 1989: merger with Vértesszőlősi Sprtacus
- Vértes-KOMÉP Spartacus: 1989 – 1991
- 1991: dissolved, riths were trasnferred to Vértesszőlős

== Honours ==
=== League ===
- Nemzeti Bajnokság II:
  - Winners (1): 1950
- Nemzeti Bajnokság III:
  - Winners (1): 1974–75

== Seasons ==
The table below shows the seasons of Tatabányai Építők SK.

Season	Tier	Club's name	Position	Pts
1942–43	5	Felsőgallai LE	2 / 8	21
1943–44	5	Felsőgallai LE	1 / 9	29
1945–46	2	Felsőgallai Ipartelepi MÁV	10 / 14	20
1946–47	3	Felsőgallai MÁV SC	11 / 12	12
1947–48	3	Felsőgallai MÁV SC	12 / 16	27
1948–49	3	Tatabányai ISE (Felsőgallai IMÁV)	7 / 16	31
1949–50	3	Tatabányai ISE MÉMOSZ	2 / 16	38
1950	2	Tatabányai Építők	1 / 16	23
1951	2	Tatabányai Építők	10 / 14	21
1952	2	Tatabányai Építők	14 / 18	28
1953	2	Tatabányai Építők	13 / 16	24
1954	2	Tatabányai Építők	15 / 16	20
1955	3	Tatabányai Építők	5 / 16	33
1956	3	Tatabányai Építők	13 / 16	21
1957	3	Tatabányai MÁV Építők	5 / 6	6
1957–58	4	Tatabányai MÁV Építők	4 / 14	33
1958–59	4	Tatabányai MÁV Építők	6 / 13	27
1959–60	4	Tatabányai MÁV Építők	7 / 16	25
1960–61	4	Tatabányai Építők	14 / 15	19
1961–62	4	Tatabányai Építők	7 / 17	30
1962–63	4	Tatabányai Építők	5 / 18	38
1963	5	Tatabányai Építők	2 / 8	15
1964	5	Tatabányai Építők	5 / 14	34
1965	5	Tatabányai Építők	3 / 16	34
1966	5	Tatabányai Építők	8 / 16	27
1967	5	Tatabányai Építők	1 / 14	43
1968	4	Tatabányai Építők	6 / 16	29
1969	4	Tatabányai Építők	3 / 16	33
1970	4	KOMÉP SC	4 / 16	18
1970–71	4	KOMÉP SC Tatabánya	1 / 16	48
1971–72	3	KOMÉP SC	10 / 16	28
1972–73	3	Komép Tatabánya	11 / 16	24
1973–74	3	KOMÉP SC	6 / 16	32
1974–75	3	KOMÉP SC	1 / 20	51
1975–76	4	KOMÉP SC	1 / 16	54
1976–77	4	KOMÉP SC	1 / 16	57
1977–78	3	KOMÉP SC	9 / 20	42
1978–79	2	KOMÉP Tatabánya	12 / 20	36
1979–80	2	KOMÉP SC	11 / 20	34
1987–88	5	KOMÉP	3 / 12	22
1988–89	5	KOMÉP	1 / 14	32
1989–90	4	Vértes-Komép	1 / 14	41
1990–91	4	Vértes Komép	3 / 15	37
