= 1963–64 OB I bajnoksag season =

Hungarian hockey league season

The 1963–64 OB I bajnokság season was the 27th season of the OB I bajnokság, the top level of ice hockey in Hungary. Eight teams participated in the league, and Ferencvarosi TC won the championship.

== First round ==
	Club	GP	W	T	L	Goals	Pts
1.	Vörös Meteor Budapest	7	5	2	0	61:17	12
2.	BVSC Budapest	7	4	3	0	53:11	11
3.	Ferencvárosi TC	7	5	1	1	53:21	11
4.	Újpesti Dózsa SC	7	4	2	1	83:17	10
5.	Postás Budapest	7	2	1	4	31:62	5
6.	Építõk Budapest	7	2	0	5	30:36	4
7.	Spartacus Budapest	7	1	0	6	21:59	2
8.	Elõre Budapest	7	0	1	6	9:118	1

== Second round ==
=== Final round ===
	Club	GP	W	T	L	Goals	Pts
1.	Ferencvárosi TC	12	7	4	1	55:39	18
2.	BVSC Budapest	12	5	4	3	31:34	14
3.	Újpesti Dózsa SC	12	6	1	5	51:40	13
4.	Vörös Meteor Budapest	12	1	1	10	32:56	3

=== Placing round ===
	Club	GP	W	T	L	Goals	Pts
5.	Építõk Budapest	12	11	0	1	63:17	22
6.	Spartacus Budapest	12	7	0	5	36:42	14
7.	Postás Budapest	12	4	0	8	44:51	8
8.	Elõre Budapest	12	2	0	10	34:67	4
