= Martfűi LSE =

Hungarian football club

- Full name: Martfűi Labdarúgó Sportegyesület
- Founded: 1942
- League: Nemzeti Bajnokság III
- Website: https://www.martfu.hu/index.php?module=news&action=show&nid=175000
Home colours

Martfűi Labdarúgó Sportegyesület is a professional football club based in Martfű, Jász–Nagykun–Szolnok County, Hungary, that competes in the Megyei Bajnokság I, the fourth tier of Hungarian football.

== History ==
Martfű won the Alföld group of the 1943–44 Nemzeti Bajnokság III season. However, the club were not promoted to the second division. In 1964, Martfű won the third division once again. In the 1964 Megyei Bajnokság I season, the club finished in the first place in the southeastern group. Nevertheless, in the 1965 Nemzeti Bajnokság III season, Martfű finished in the last position and thus were releagted to the fourth tier. In the 1966 Nemzeti Bajnokság III, they finished in the third position and gained promotion to the third tier. However, in the 1967 Nemzeti Bajnokság II, Martfű finished in the last position and thus were releagted to the third tier. Between 1968 and 1972, the club spent five consecutive years in the third division, followed by three years in the Megyei Bajnokság I. Martfű were promoted to the third league; however, they finished in the last position in the 1975–76 Nemzeti Bajnokság III season, as Tisza Cipő, and were relegated back to the county league.

== Name changes ==
- Cikta Levente SE: 1942 - 1945
- Martfűi Cikta MTE: 1945 - 1949
- Martfűi BDSE: 1949 - 1951
- Martfűi Vörös Lobogó: 1951 - 1957
- Martfűi Tisza Cipő: 1957 - 1957
- Martfűi MSE: 1957 - 1970
- Tisza Cipő Sportegyesület: 1970 - 1991
- Martfűi Városi Sportegyesület: 1991. április 8. - 2001?
- Martfűi Labdarúgó Sportegyesület: 2001? - 2013
- Martfűi Városi Sportegyesület: 2013 - 2015
- Martfűi Labdarúgó Sportegyesület: 2016 -

== Seasons ==
As of 12 October 2026.

Season	Division	Club's name	Position	Pts
1943–44	3	Cikta LE Martfű	1 / 14	39
1944–45	2	Cikta LE	7 / 16	6
1944–45	2	Cikta Martfű	0 / 12	
1945–46	2	Martfűi Cikta	5 / 14	
1946–47	4	Martfűi Cikta MTE	0 / 14	
1947–48	4	Cikta SE (Martfű)	1 / 16	
1948–49	3	Martfűi Cikta	2 / 16	48
1949–50	3	Martfúi BDSE	6 / 16	32
1950	3	Martfűi BDSE	3 / 17	24
1951	3	Martfűi Vörös Lobogó	2 / 14	35
1952	3	Martfűi Vörös Lobogó	4 / 14	34
1953	3	Martfűi Vörös Lobogó	5 / 16	33
1954	3	Martfűi Vörös Lobogó	7 / 16	31
1955	3	Martfűi Vörös Lobogó	9 / 17	32
1956	3	Martfűi Vörös Lobogó	11 / 16	25
1957	3	Martfűi Tisza Cipő	2 / 7	15
1957–58	3	Martfűi MSE	2 / 16	41
1958–59	3	Martfűi MSE	2 / 16	40
1959–60	3	Martfűi Tisza Cipőgyári MSE	8 / 17	30
1960–61	3	Martfűi MSE	11 / 16	30
1961–62	3	Martfűi MSE	9 / 16	29
1962–63	3	Martfűi MSE	5 / 16	32
1963	4	Martfűi MSE	4 / 16	17
1964	4	Martfűi MSE	1 / 16	41
1965	3	Martfűi MSE	18 / 18	21
1966	4	Martfűi MSE	3 / 16	42
1967	3	Martfűi MSE	16 / 16	15
1968	4	Martfűi MSE	5 / 16	34
1969	4	Martfűi MSE	11 / 16	28
1970	4	Tisza Cipőgyár SE	1 / 16	24
1970–71	4	Tisza Cipő SE	13 / 16	24
1971–72	4	Tisza Cipő SE	15 / 16	20
1972–73	5	Tisza Cipő SE	4 / 16	36
1973–74	5	Tisza Cipő SE	3 / 16	38
1974–75	4	Tisza Cipő SE	1 / 16	44
1975–76	3	Tisza Cipő SE	20 / 20	22
1976–77	4	Tisza Cipő SE	12 / 18	29
1977–78	4	Tisza Cipő SE	6 / 18	39
1978–79	3	Tisza Cipő SE	2 / 18	55
1979–80	3	Tisza Cipő SE	6 / 18	40
1980–81	3	Tisza Cipő SE	5 / 18	36
1981–82	4	Tisza Cipő SE	1 / 18	48
1982–83	4	Tisza Cipő SE	1 / 18	52
1983–84	3	Tisza Cipő SE	13 / 16	22
1984–85	3	Tisza Cipő SE	15 / 16	23
1985–86	4	Tisza Cipő SE	1 / 18	49
1986–87	3	Tisza Cipő SE	13 / 16	25
1987–88	3	Tisza Cipő SE	16 / 16	9
1988–89	4	Tisza Cipő SE	5 / 16	36
1989–90	4	Tisza Cipő SE	6 / 16	42
1990–91	4	Martfűi VSE	4 / 16	35
1991–92	4	Martfűi VSE	9 / 16	29
1992–93	4	Martfűi VSE	3 / 16	37
1993–94	4	Martfűi VSE	8 / 18	39
1994–95	4	Martfűi VSE	13 / 18	34
1995–96	4	Martfűi Városi SE	11 / 18	39
1996–97	4	Martfűi VSE	14 / 16	28
1997–98	5	Martfűi VSE	9 / 16	35
1998–99	5	Martfű	1 / 16	61
1999–00	4	Martfűi VSE	10 / 16	37
2000	3	Martfűi VSE	7 / 8	4
2000–01	4	Martfűi VSE	11 / 11	12
2001–02	6	Martfű	10 / 14	28
2002–03	7	Martfűi VSE	1 / 6	73
2003–04	6	Martfű	2 / 16	69
2004–05	5	Martfű	2 / 15	58
2005–06	4	Martfű	2 / 16	61
2006–07	4	Martfűi LSE	3 / 16	62
2007–08	5	Martfűi LSE	2 / 18	75
2008–09	5	Martfűi LSE	2 / 18	70
2009–10	5	Martfű LSE	3 / 18	72
2010–11	5	Martfűi LSE	1 / 14	62
2011–12	4	Martfűi LSE	11 / 16	36
2012–13	4	Martfűi LSE	16 / 16	22
2013–14	4	Martfűi VSE	13 / 16	26
2014–15	4	Martfűi VSE	16 / 16	24
2016–17	6	Martfűi LSE	1 / 15	76
2017–18	5	Martfűi LSE	3 / 15	63
2018–19	5	Martfűi LSE	5 / 16	52
2019–20	5	Martfűi LSE	1 / 15	38
2020–21	4	Martfűi LSE	5 / 15	49
2021–22	4	Martfűi LSE	3 / 15	66
2022–23	4	Martfűi LSE	1 / 16	79
2023–24	3	Martfűi LSE	10 / 16	34
2024–25	3	Martfűi LSE	12 / 16	29
2025–26	3	Martfűi LSE	15 / 16	20
