= 1965–66 OB I bajnoksag season =

Hungarian ice hockey season

The 1965–66 OB I bajnokság season was the 29th season of the OB I bajnokság, the top level of ice hockey in Hungary. Eight teams participated in the league, and Ujpesti Dozsa SC won the championship.

== First round ==
	Club	GP	W	T	L	Goals	Pts
1.	BVSC Budapest	14	12	1	1	93:19	25
2.	Újpesti Dózsa SC	14	11	1	2	129:39	23
3.	Ferencvárosi TC	14	10	2	2	119:32	22
4.	Vörös Meteor Budapest	14	7	0	7	82:42	14
5.	Elõre Budapest	14	5	1	8	41:88	11
6.	Postás Budapest	14	5	0	9	55:122	10
7.	Építõk Budapest	14	2	1	11	29:81	5
8.	Spartacus Budapest	14	1	0	13	28:153	2

== Second round ==
=== Final round ===
	Club	GP	W	T	L	Goals	Pts
1.	Újpesti Dózsa SC	20	16	2	2	165:61	34
2.	Ferencvárosi TC	20	14	3	3	142:43	31
3.	BVSC Budapest	20	12	2	6	116:50	26
4.	Vörös Meteor Budapest	20	8	1	11	95:73	17

=== Placing round ===
	Club	GP	W	T	L	Goals	Pts
5.	Postás Budapest	20	9	0	11	96:149	18
6.	Elõre Budapest	20	7	3	10	68:109	17
7.	Építõk Budapest	20	5	3	12	57:99	13
8.	Spartacus Budapest	20	2	0	18	45:200	4
