= 1964–65 OB I bajnoksag season =

Hungarian ice hockey season

The 1964–65 OB I bajnokság season was the 28th season of the OB I bajnokság, the top level of ice hockey in Hungary. Eight teams participated in the league, and Ujpesti Dozsa SC won the championship.

== Regular season ==
	Club	GP	W	T	L	Goals	Pts
1.	Újpesti Dózsa SC	14	13	0	1	137:22	26
2.	BVSC Budapest	14	13	0	1	96:28	26
3.	Ferencvárosi TC	14	9	0	5	98:39	18
4.	Vörös Meteor Budapest	14	9	0	5	92:47	18
5.	Építõk Budapest	14	6	0	8	48:77	12
6.	Elõre Budapest	14	3	0	11	36:89	6
7.	Postás Budapest	14	3	0	11	45:101	6
8.	Spartacus Budapest	14	0	0	14	21:170	0

== Final ==
- Újpesti Dózsa SC - BVSC Budapest 3:2/3:3
