= 1966–67 OB I bajnoksag season =

Hungarian ice hockey season

The 1966–67 OB I bajnokság season was the 30th season of the OB I bajnokság, the top level of ice hockey in Hungary. Eight teams participated in the league, and Ferencvarosi TC won the championship.

== First round ==
	Club	GP	W	T	L	Goals	Pts
1.	Ferencvárosi TC	14	12	1	1	115:23	25
2.	BVSC Budapest	14	11	3	0	88:22	25
3.	Újpesti Dózsa SC	14	10	2	2	141:34	22
4.	Vörös Meteor Budapest	14	6	2	6	48:66	14
5.	Építõk Budapest	14	4	1	9	27:83	9
6.	Spartacus Budapest	14	2	2	10	34:89	6
7.	Elõre Budapest	14	2	2	10	37:93	6
8.	Postás Budapest	14	1	3	10	40:120	5

== Second round ==
=== Final round ===
	Club	GP	W	T	L	Goals	Pts
1.	Ferencvárosi TC	20	16	1	3	140:39	33
2.	BVSC Budapest	20	15	3	2	114:44	33
3.	Újpesti Dózsa SC	20	14	2	4	175:52	28
4.	Vörös Meteor Budapest	20	6	2	12	56:103	14

=== Placing round ===
	Club	GP	W	T	L	Goals	Pts
5.	Építõk Budapest	20	8	1	11	54:103	17
6.	Postás Budapest	20	5	3	12	77:145	13
7.	Elõre Budapest	20	4	2	14	54:116	10
8.	Spartacus Budapest	20	4	2	14	57:125	10
