= RÁBA KÖG SK =

Hungarian football club

- Full name: Rába–Kispesti Öntöde és Gépgyár Sport Klub
- Founded: 1913
Home colours

RÁBA KÖG SK (Rába–Kispesti Öntöde és Gépgyár Sport Klub) or Vörös Csillag Traktorgyári SK is a defunct professional football club based in Kispest, (from 1950 Budapest), Hungary.

== Background ==
In 1948, the Kispest factory of Hofherr-Schrantz-Clayton-Shuttleworth Magyar Gépgyári Művek Rt. was transformed into a state-owned enterprise under the name Hofherr Schrantz Traktorgyár N.V. K.F. Mihály Zsofinyecz, who was later appointed Minister of Industry, took the helm of the state-owned company; he served as the factory's workers’ director from 1948 to 1949 and then as its CEO. The company's name was first changed to Hofherr Schrantz Tractor Factory, and then, on November 21, 1951, to Red Star Tractor Factory. Production resumed at the factory in 1950 after the damage from World War II had been repaired. Agricultural tractors bearing the Dutra brand name were the factory's sought-after export items.

Effective June 30, 1973, the Vörös Csillag Traktorgyár was merged with the Rába Hungarian Carriage and Machine Factory in Győr. Starting in 1975, the Rába Hungarian Carriage and Machine Factory took over tractor production. Until 2001, another legendary Hungarian tractor model following the Dutra was manufactured here: the Rába-Steiger and the Rába 320. Afterward, it operated first as a subsidiary and then, starting in 1992, as a Budapest branch of Rába Hungarian Wagon and Machine Works, Inc. On September 12, 2006, liquidation proceedings began against the company, which were concluded in 2010.

== Club ==
RÁBA KÖG SK won the North-central group of the 1960–61 Nemzeti Bajnokság III season and gained promotion to the second division, as Traktorgyári SE. However, RÁBA KÖG SK finished in the 15h position in the 1961–62 Nemzeti Bajnokság II season and were relegated. RÁBA KÖG SK won the following season as Vörös Csillag Traktorgyár, 1962–63 Nemzeti Bajnokság III, and gained promotion to the second tier.

== Name changes ==
- Hofherr és Schrantz Sport Club: 1913 – 1918
- Between 1918 and 1940 did not function
- Hofherr-gyári SC: 1940 – 1951
- Vasas Vörös Csillag Traktorgyári SK: 1951 – ?
- Vörös Csillag Dutra: ? – ?
- Vörös Csillag Gépgyár: ? – 1973
- RÁBA KÖG SK: 1973 – ?

== Honours ==
=== League ===
- Nemzeti Bajnokság III:
  - Winners (2): 1960–61, 1962–63

== Seasons ==
The table below shows the seasons of RÁBA KÖG SK.

Season	Tier	Club's name	Position	Pts
1915	2	Hofherr és Schrantz SC	12 / 12	3
1915	3	Hofherr és Schrantz SC	3 / 8	9
1916	2	Hofherr és Schrantz SC	5 / 8	3
1916–17	2	Hofherr és Schrantz SC	8 / 12	5
1917–18	2	Hofherr és Schrantz SC	12 / 12	8
1943–44	3	HoSC	5 / 15	34
1944–45	2	Hoffher SC	5 / 16	12
1944–45	3	Hofherr SC	0 / 14	
1945–46	3	Hofherr SC	8 / 14	22
1946–47	4	Hofherr SC	4 / 16	33
1947–48	4	Hofherr SC	3 / 16	45
1948–49	4	Hofherr SC	2 / 15	39
1949–50	3	Hofherr SC	13 / 16	22
1950	3	Hofherr-gyári SC	6 / 16	17
1951	3	Vörös Csillag Traktorgyár	6 / 12	23
1952	3	Vörös Csillag Traktorgyár	3 / 14	40
1953	3	Vasas Vörös Csillag Traktorgyár	7 / 16	29
1954	3	Traktorgyár	6 / 16	35
1955	3	Vörös Csillag Traktorgyár	7 / 16	30
1956	3	Traktorgyári Vasas	6 / 14	32
1957	3	Traktorgyár	1 / 8	23
1957–58	3	Vörös Csillag Traktorgyár SK	3 / 16	43
1958–59	3	Vörös Csillag Traktorgyár SK	3 / 16	39
1959–60	3	Vörös Csillag Traktorgyár SK	2 / 16	43
1960–61	3	Traktorgyári SE	1 / 16	44
1961–62	2	VCS Traktorgyár	15 / 16	21
1962–63	3	Vörös Csillag Traktorgyár	1 / 16	44
1963	3	Vörös Csillag Traktorgyár	12 / 18	14
1964	3	Vörös Csillag Traktorgyár	17 / 18	25
1965	4	VCS Traktorgyár	2 / 16	41
1966	4	VCS Traktorgyári SE	6 / 16	35
1967	4	VCS Traktorgyár	3 / 16	38
1968	4	VCS Traktorgyár	5 / 16	38
1969	4	Vörös Csillag Dutra	2 / 16	41
1970	4	VCS Dutra	2 / 16	22
1970–71	4	Vörös Csillag DUTRA SK	2 / 16	37
1971–72	4	VCS DUTRA	2 / 16	38
1972–73	4	VCS Dutra	7 / 16	32
1973–74	4	VCS Gépgyár	6 / 16	32
1974–75	4	VCS Gépgyár	3 / 18	44
1975–76	4	VCS Gépgyár	7 / 18	40
1976–77	4	VCS Gépgyár	4 / 18	44
1977–78	4	VCS Gépgyár	6 / 18	36
1978–79	3	VCS Gépgyár	12 / 20	36
1979–80	3	Vörös Csillag Gépgyár	7 / 20	42
1980–81	3	VCS Gépgyár	17 / 20	29
1981–82	4	VCS Gépgyár	6 / 16	33
1982–83	4	VCS Gépgyár	15 / 16	16
1983–84	5	VCS Gépgyár	10 / 16	26
1984–85	5	MVG Vörös Csillag Gépgyár	11 / 16	24
1985–86	5	MVG Vörös Csillag Gépgyár	1 / 16	48
1986–87	4	Vörös Csillag Gépgyár	16 / 16	11
1987–88	5	VCS Gépgyár	0 / 14	
1988–89	5	VCS Gépgyár	11 / 15	25
1989–90	5	VCS Gépgyár	13 / 16	14
1990–91	5	VCS Gépgyár Rába SK	8 / 15	26
1992–93	5	Rába KÖG SK	7 / 16	30
1993–94	5	RÁBA KÖG SK	2 / 16	42
1994–95	4	Rába KÖG SK	7 / 16	45
1995–96	4	Rába KÖG-SZAC	11 / 16	33
