= 1968 Nemzeti Bajnokság II =

Nemzeti Bajnokság II
- Season: 1968
- Champions: Egri Dózsa SC
- Promoted: Egri Dózsa SC (winners); Komlói Bányász SK (runners-up)
- Relegated: Budapesti VSC; Nyíregyháza Spartacus FC; Budafoki MTE

The 1968 Nemzeti Bajnokság II was the 70th season of the Nemzeti Bajnokság II, the second tier of the Hungarian football league.

== League table ==
Pos	Team	Pld	W	D	L	GF	GA	GD	Pts	Promotion or relegation
1	Egri Dózsa SC	34	18	11	5	51	30	+21	47	Promotion to Nemzeti Bajnokság I
2	Komlói Bányász SK	34	18	10	6	45	21	+24	46	Promotion to Nemzeti Bajnokság I
3	Kecskeméti Dózsa	34	15	10	9	42	35	+7	40	
4	Budapesti Előre SC	34	13	13	8	37	25	+12	39	
5	Nagybátonyi Bányász SC	34	16	6	12	49	41	+8	38	
6	Oroszlányi Bányász	34	13	10	11	54	46	+8	36	
7	Pécsi Bányász	34	14	7	13	36	39	−3	35	
8	Ganz-MÁVAG SE	34	13	9	12	34	37	−3	35	
9	Szállítók SE	34	14	6	14	50	42	+8	34	
10	Budapesti Spartacus SC	34	10	14	10	41	45	−4	34	
11	Várpalotai Bányász SK	34	12	9	13	38	35	+3	33	
12	Győri Dózsa SK	34	12	9	13	45	46	−1	33	
13	Szolnoki MTE	34	12	8	14	40	49	−9	32	
14	Miskolci VSC	34	10	11	13	31	41	−10	31	
15	Ózdi Kohász SE	34	8	12	14	30	37	−7	28	
16	Budapesti VSC	34	10	7	17	40	46	−6	27	Relegation to Nemzeti Bajnokság III
17	Nyíregyházi Spartacus SC	34	7	8	19	29	49	−20	22	Relegation to Nemzeti Bajnokság III
18	Budafoki MTE Kinizsi	34	7	8	19	33	61	−28	22	Relegation to Nemzeti Bajnokság III

== See also ==
- 1968 Magyar Kupa
- 1968 Nemzeti Bajnokság I
- 1968 Nemzeti Bajnokság III
