= 1961–62 Nemzeti Bajnokság II =

Nemzeti Bajnokság II
- Season: 1961–62
- Champions: Szombathelyi Haladás (West); Debreceni VSC (East)
- Promoted: Szombathelyi Haladás (West); Debreceni VSC (East)
- Relegated: Soproni VSE (West); VCS Traktorgyár (West); Pénzügyőr SE (West) Ceglédi VSE (East); KISTEXT SK (East); Szegedi Építők (East)

The 1961–62 Nemzeti Bajnokság II was the 63rd season of the Nemzeti Bajnokság II, the second tier of the Hungarian football league.

== League table ==
=== Western group ===
Pos	Team	Pld	W	D	L	GF	GA	GD	Pts	Promotion or relegation
1	Szombathelyi Haladás	30	21	5	4	68	24	+44	47	Promotion to Nemzeti Bajnokság I
2	Budapesti VSC	30	15	11	4	50	25	+25	41	
3	Székesfehérvári VT Vasas	30	17	5	8	47	22	+25	39	
4	Budafoki MTE Kinizsi	30	11	14	5	33	22	+11	36	
5	Dunaújvárosi Kohász SE	30	14	8	8	51	38	+13	36	
6	Oroszlányi Bányász SK	30	11	13	6	35	28	+7	35	
7	Budai Spartacus SC	30	12	11	7	36	29	+7	35	
8	FŐSPED Szállítók SE	30	8	11	11	40	37	+3	27	
9	Erzsébeti Vasas TK	30	8	10	12	31	35	−4	26	
10	Mosonmagyaróvári TE	30	7	11	12	25	43	−18	25	
11	Kaposvári Kinizsi	30	7	10	13	28	40	−12	24	
12	Zalaegerszegi TE	30	8	7	15	41	58	−17	23	
13	Kőbányai Lombik TK	30	6	11	13	30	45	−15	23	
14	Soproni VSE	30	5	11	14	37	59	−22	21	Relegation to Nemzeti Bajnokság III
15	VCS Traktorgyár	30	7	7	16	32	55	−23	21	Relegation to Nemzeti Bajnokság III
16	Pénzügyőrök SE	30	9	3	18	29	53	−24	21	Relegation to Nemzeti Bajnokság III

=== Eastern group ===
Pos	Team	Pld	W	D	L	GF	GA	GD	Pts	Promotion or relegation
1	Debreceni VSC	30	17	7	6	64	34	+30	41	Promotion to Nemzeti Bajnokság I
2	Láng Vasas SK	30	16	6	8	51	36	+15	38	
3	Budapesti Előre SC	30	13	9	8	55	40	+15	35	
4	Diósgyőri VTK	30	14	7	9	41	30	+11	35	
5	Ganz-MÁVAG SE	30	15	5	10	46	39	+7	35	
6	VM Egyetértés	30	13	8	9	35	22	+13	34	
7	Miskolci VSC	30	11	8	11	39	37	+2	30	
8	Debreceni EAC	30	12	6	12	31	36	−5	30	
9	Szolnoki MÁV SE	30	10	9	11	34	26	+8	29	
10	Kecskeméti Dózsa	30	9	11	10	48	45	+3	29	
11	Borsodi Bányász SK	30	11	7	12	38	38	0	29	
12	Nyíregyházi Spartacus	30	9	11	10	28	33	−5	29	
13	Budapesti Spartacus SC	30	11	7	12	36	49	−13	29	
14	Ceglédi VSE	30	10	8	12	36	34	+2	28	Relegation to Nemzeti Bajnokság III
15	KISTEXT SK	30	3	9	18	25	71	−46	15	Relegation to Nemzeti Bajnokság III
16	Szegedi Építők	30	3	8	19	21	58	−37	14	Relegation to Nemzeti Bajnokság III

== See also ==
- 1961–62 Magyar Kupa
- 1961–62 Nemzeti Bajnokság I
- 1961–62 Nemzeti Bajnokság III
