= 1962–63 Nemzeti Bajnokság II =

Nemzeti Bajnokság II
- Season: 1962–63
- Champions: Csepel SC (West); Diósgyőri VTK (East)
- Promoted: Csepel SC (West); Diósgyőri VTK (East)
- Relegated: Pécsi VSK (West); Budai Spartacus SC (West); Zalaegerszegi TE (West); Mosonmagyaróvári TE (West); Erzsébeti Vasas TK (West); Kőbányai Lombik TK (West); Kaposvári Kinizsi (West); Csepel Autó SE (West); Egri Dózsa (East); Kecskeméti Dózsa (East); Szolnoki MÁV FC (East); Budai Spartacus SC (East); Szegedi VSE (East); Budapesti Előre SC (East); Salgótarjáni Kohász SE (East) Debreceni EAC (football) (East)

The 1962–63 Nemzeti Bajnokság II was the 64th season of the Nemzeti Bajnokság II, the second tier of the Hungarian football league.

== League table ==
=== Western group ===
Pos	Team	Pld	W	D	L	GF	GA	GD	Pts	Promotion or relegation
1	Csepel SC	30	23	5	2	82	21	+61	51	Promotion to Nemzeti Bajnokság I
2	Székesfehérvári VT Vasas	30	13	13	4	50	23	+27	39	
3	Dunaújvárosi Kohász SE	30	14	11	5	57	32	+25	39	
4	Budapesti VSC	30	15	6	9	42	42	0	36	
5	Győri MÁV DAC	30	9	14	7	44	37	+7	32	
6	FŐSPED Szállítók SE	30	12	8	10	34	30	+4	32	
7	Oroszlányi Bányász SK	30	10	12	8	48	43	+5	32	
8	Budafoki MTE-Kinizsi	30	11	10	9	35	36	−1	32	
9	Pécsi VSK	30	12	7	11	43	38	+5	31	Relegation to Nemzeti Bajnokság III
10	Budai Spartacus SC	30	10	11	9	36	37	−1	31	Relegation to Nemzeti Bajnokság III
11	Zalaegerszegi TE	30	9	8	13	36	53	−17	26	Relegation to Nemzeti Bajnokság III
12	Mosonmagyaróvári TE	30	6	12	12	35	55	−20	24	Relegation to Nemzeti Bajnokság III
13	Erzsébeti Vasas TK	30	5	11	14	27	39	−12	21	Relegation to Nemzeti Bajnokság III
14	Kőbányai Lombik TK	30	7	6	17	26	59	−33	20	Relegation to Nemzeti Bajnokság III
15	Kaposvári Kinizsi	30	6	7	17	36	63	−27	19	Relegation to Nemzeti Bajnokság III
16	Csepel Autó SE	30	7	1	22	29	52	−23	15	Relegation to Nemzeti Bajnokság III

=== Eastern group ===
Pos	Team	Pld	W	D	L	GF	GA	GD	Pts	Promotion or relegation
1	Diósgyőri VTK	30	19	8	3	54	18	+36	46	Promotion to Nemzeti Bajnokság I
2	Ózdi Kohász SE	30	19	7	4	57	19	+38	45	
3	Miskolci VSC	30	14	8	8	40	27	+13	36	
4	Nyíregyháza Spartacus	30	12	9	9	47	48	−1	33	
5	VM Egyetértés	30	12	7	11	41	37	+4	31	
6	Borsodi Bányász SK	30	11	9	10	36	37	−1	31	
7	Láng Vasas SK	30	10	10	10	38	41	−3	30	
8	Ganz-MÁVAG SE	30	10	9	11	42	43	−1	29	
9	Egri Dózsa	30	12	3	15	35	42	−7	26	Relegation to Nemzeti Bajnokság III
10	Kecskeméti Dózsa	30	8	10	12	35	32	+3	26	Relegation to Nemzeti Bajnokság III
11	Szolnoki MÁV	30	10	6	14	30	39	−9	26	Relegation to Nemzeti Bajnokság III
12	Budapesti Spartacus SC	30	10	6	14	39	52	−13	26	Relegation to Nemzeti Bajnokság III
13	Szegedi VSE	30	9	7	14	35	52	−17	25	Relegation to Nemzeti Bajnokság III
14	Budapesti Előre SC	30	11	2	17	37	47	−10	24	Relegation to Nemzeti Bajnokság III
15	Salgótarjáni Kohász SE	30	8	7	15	30	46	−16	23	Relegation to Nemzeti Bajnokság III
16	Debreceni EAC	30	8	6	16	28	44	−16	22	Relegation to Nemzeti Bajnokság III

== See also ==
- 1962–63 Magyar Kupa
- 1962–63 Nemzeti Bajnokság I
