= Egri Dózsa SE =

Hungarian football club

- Full name: Egri Dózsa Sportegyesület
- Founded: 1950
- Dissolved: 1976
Home colours

Egri Dózsa SE is a defunct professional football club based in Eger, Heves county, Hungary.

== History ==
Egri Dózsa SE was established in 1950. It was known as Egri Dózsa from 1950 to 1957. From 1957-61 the club didn't play any matches. In 1961 it was taken over by the football department of Egri Vasas. It was known as Egri Dózsa from 1961 - 1977, and in 1977 the club merged with Egri Vasas, Egri Kinizsi and Egri Volán, with the merged club named Eger SE.

In 2019, Géza Winkler, former player of the club, died at the age of 81.

In 2026, the club celebrated their former goalkeeper János Csank, who later became the head coach of the national team of Hungary.

== Name changes ==
- Egri Dózsa: 1950 - 1957
- 1957-61: did not function
- 1961: take over of the department of Egri Vasas
- Egri Dózsa: 1961 - 1977
- 1977: merger with Egri Vasas, Egri Kinizsi and Egri Volán as Eger SE

== Honours ==
=== League ===
- Nemzeti Bajnokság II:
  - Winners (1): 1968
- Nemzeti Bajnokság III:
  - Winners (3): 1961–62, 1963, 1965

== Seasons ==
The table shows the seasons of Egri Dózsa SE.

Season	Tier	Club's name	Position	Pts
1951	4	Egri Dózsa	6 / 9	8
1952	4	Egri Dózsa	5 / 10	14
1954	3	Egri Dózsa	11 / 16	25
1955	3	Egri Dózsa	12 / 14	16
1956	3	Egri Dózsa	14 / 14	12
1959–60	5	Egri Dózsa	0 / 8	1
1961–62	3	Egri Dózsa	1 / 16	49
1962–63	2	Egri Dózsa	9 / 16	26
1963	3	Egri Dózsa	1 / 18	27
1964	3	Egri Dózsa SC	2 / 18	48
1965	3	Egri Dózsa SC	1 / 18	48
1966	2	Egri Dózsa SC	2 / 16	35
1967	1	Egri Dózsa SE	16 / 16	19
1968	2	Egri Dózsa SC	1 / 18	47
1969	1	Egri Dózsa SE	16 / 16	17
1970	2	Egri Dózsa	5 / 9	18
1970–71	2	Egri Dózsa SC	2 / 18	51
1971–72	1	Egri Dózsa SE	15 / 16	20
1972–73	2	Egri Dózsa	13 / 18	30
1973–74	2	Egri Dózsa	11 / 18	31
1974–75	2	Egri Dózsa	19 / 20	29
1975–76	3	Egri Dózsa	1 / 20	58

== Managers ==
- Ferenc Szusza (1969)

== Notable players ==
- János Csank (1972-1979)
