= 1966 Nemzeti Bajnokság II =

Nemzeti Bajnokság II
- Season: 1966
- Champions: Szegedi EAC
- Promoted: Szegedi EAC (winners); Egri Dózsa SC (runners-up); Komlói Bányász SK; Szombathelyi Haladás
- Relegated: Kaposvári Honvéd SE; Győri MÁV DAC

The 1966 Nemzeti Bajnokság II was the 68th season of the Nemzeti Bajnokság II, the second tier of the Hungarian football league.

== League table ==
Pos	Team	Pld	W	D	L	GF	GA	GD	Pts	Promotion or relegation
1	Szegedi EAC	30	16	3	11	54	43	+11	35	Promotion to Nemzeti Bajnokság I
2	Egri Dózsa SC	30	14	7	9	42	45	−3	35	Promotion to Nemzeti Bajnokság I
3	Komlói Bányász SK	30	13	8	9	56	39	+17	34	Promotion to Nemzeti Bajnokság I
4	Szombathelyi Haladás	30	11	12	7	47	33	+14	34	Promotion to Nemzeti Bajnokság I
5	BVSC	30	13	8	9	41	39	+2	34	
6	Ganz-MÁVAG SE	30	13	7	10	42	33	+9	33	
7	Oroszlányi Bányász SK	30	10	12	8	30	25	+5	32	
8	Debreceni VSC	30	12	8	10	45	42	+3	32	
9	FŐSPED Szállítók SE	30	10	10	10	31	35	−4	30	
10	Budafoki MTE Kinizsi	30	10	7	13	43	41	+2	27	
11	Székesfehérvári VT Vasas	30	10	7	13	38	37	+1	27	
12	VM Egyetértés	30	9	9	12	32	32	0	27	
13	Nyíregyházi Spartacus	30	11	5	14	35	43	−8	27	
14	Miskolci Vasutas SC	30	6	14	10	29	44	−15	26	
15	Kaposvári Honvéd SE	30	9	7	14	40	55	−15	25	Relegation to Nemzeti Bajnokság III
16	Győri MÁV DAC	30	5	12	13	32	51	−19	22	Relegation to Nemzeti Bajnokság III

== See also ==
- 1966 Magyar Kupa
- 1966 Nemzeti Bajnokság I
- 1966 Nemzeti Bajnokság III
