= Csepel Autó SE =

Hungarian football club

- Full name: Csepel Autó SE
- Founded: 1949
- Dissolved: 1975
- Ground: Dunaharaszti Sportpálya
Home colours

Csepel Autó SE is a defunct professional football club based in Szigethalom, Pest County, Hungary. The club was sports team of the Csepel Automobile Factory.

== History ==
Csepel Autó SE won the 1961–62 Nemzeti Bajnokság III season and gained promotion to the second division.

== Name changes ==
- 1949 – 1951: Csepel Autógyár
- 1951: merger with Szilágyi-telepi MTK
- 1951 – 1952: Csepel Autó (Szigethalom)
- 1952 – ?: Csepel Autógyári Vasas
- 1952: merger with Dunaharaszti MTK
- 1959: split
- 1959 – 1964: Csepel Autó SE
- 1963: merger with Szigetszentmiklósi TK
- 1964 – ?: Szigetszentmiklósi Csepel Autó Vasas
- split with Szigetszentmiklósi TK
- 1964 – 1975: Csepel Autó SE

== Honours ==
=== League ===
- Nemzeti Bajnokság III:
  - Winners (1): 1961–62

== Seasons ==
The table below shows Csepel Autó SE's seasons.

Season	Tier	Club's name	Position	Pts
1951	3	Csepel Autó (Szigethalom)	10 / 14	23
1952	3	Csepel Autógyári Vasas	1 / 14	38
1953	3	Csepel Autó	1 / 16	48
1954	3	Csepel Autó	1 / 16	55
1955	3	Csepel Autó	1 / 14	38
1956	3	Csepel Autó	6 / 14	30
1957	3	Csepel Autó	11 / 11	-
1957–58	2	Csepel Autó SK	9 / 19	37
1958–59	2	Csepel Autó	16 / 16	13
1959–60	3	Csepel Autó	3 / 17	38
1960–61	3	Csepel Autó	6 / 16	35
1961–62	3	Csepel Autó	1 / 16	44
1962–63	2	Csepel Autó	16 / 16	15
1963	4	Csepel Autó	11 / 16	14
1964	4	Csepel Autó	14 / 16	25
1965	5	Csepel Autó SK	2 / 16	39
1966	5	Csepel Autó SK	12 / 16	26
1967	5	Csepel Autó SK	9 / 16	30
1968	5	Csepel Autó SK	5 / 16	34
1969	5	Csepel Autó SK	15 / 16	22
1970	6	Csepel Autó	3 / 8	17
1970–71	6	Csepel Autó	1 / 13	34
1971–72	5	Csepel Autó SK	14 / 16	23
1972–73	5	Csepel Autó SK	13 / 16	22
1973–74	5	Csepel Autó Vasas	12 / 16	26
1974–75	5	Csepel Autó	0 / 14	
1975–76	5	Csepel Autó	0 / 14	
