= 1975–76 Nemzeti Bajnokság II =

Nemzeti Bajnokság II
- Season: 1975–76
- Champions: Dunaújváros FC (1952)
- Promoted: Dunaújváros FC (1952) (winners); Dorogi AC (runners-up)
- Relegated: FŐSPED Szállítók SE; Budapesti Spartacus SC; Bábolnai SE; Nagybátonyi Bányász SC

The 1975–76 Nemzeti Bajnokság II was the 78th season of the Nemzeti Bajnokság II, the second tier of the Hungarian football league.

== League table ==
Pos	Team	Pld	W	D	L	GF	GA	GD	Pts	Promotion or relegation
1	Dunaújvárosi Kohász SE	38	23	12	3	78	29	+49	58	Promotion to Nemzeti Bajnokság I
2	Dorogi AC	38	22	10	6	75	40	+35	54	Promotion to Nemzeti Bajnokság I
3	Budafoki MTE Kinizsi	38	22	7	9	87	54	+33	51	
4	Debreceni VSC	38	20	9	9	70	43	+27	49	
5	Budapesti VSC	38	18	11	9	69	44	+25	47	
6	Volán SC	38	17	11	10	54	44	+10	45	
7	Pécsi Munkás SC	38	18	8	12	59	36	+23	44	
8	Kossuth KFSE	38	17	8	13	67	46	+21	42	
9	Szolnoki MTE	38	14	11	13	52	45	+7	39	
10	Bp. Vasas Izzó SK	38	13	11	14	49	55	−6	37	
11	Komlói Bányász SK	38	12	13	13	43	53	−10	37	
12	MÁV DAC	38	13	8	17	48	57	−9	34	
13	Szekszárdi Dózsa SC	38	10	13	15	47	60	−13	33	
14	Oroszlányi Bányász SK	38	12	9	17	46	59	−13	33	
15	Várpalotai Bányász SK	38	11	11	16	45	63	−18	33	
16	Nagykanizsai Olajbányász SE	38	11	11	16	39	57	−18	33	
17	FŐSPED Szállítók SE	38	9	8	21	47	69	−22	26	Relegation to Nemzeti Bajnokság III
18	Budapesti Spartacus SC	38	7	9	22	42	84	−42	23	Relegation to Nemzeti Bajnokság III
19	Bábolnai SE	38	8	5	25	47	81	−34	21	Relegation to Nemzeti Bajnokság III
20	Nagybátonyi Bányász SC	38	8	5	25	31	76	−45	21	Relegation to Nemzeti Bajnokság III

== See also ==
- 1975–76 Magyar Kupa
- 1975–76 Nemzeti Bajnokság I
