= 1967 Nemzeti Bajnokság II =

Nemzeti Bajnokság II
- Season: 1967
- Champions: Egyetértés SC
- Promoted: Egyetértés SC (winners); Székesfehérvári VT Vasas (runners-up)
- Relegated: Dorogi Bányász SC; Fővárosi Autóbusz SK; Debreceni VSC

The 1967 Nemzeti Bajnokság II was the 69th season of the Nemzeti Bajnokság II, the second tier of the Hungarian football league.

== League table ==
Pos	Team	Pld	W	D	L	GF	GA	GD	Pts	Promotion or relegation
1	Egyetértés SC	34	18	10	6	62	29	+33	46	Promotion to Nemzeti Bajnokság I
2	Székesfehérvári VT Vasas	34	20	6	8	60	31	+29	46	Promotion to Nemzeti Bajnokság I
3	Budapesti VSC	34	16	9	9	57	31	+26	41	
4	Oroszlányi Bányász SK	34	16	9	9	58	38	+20	41	
5	FŐSPED Szállítók SE	34	16	8	10	53	34	+19	40	
6	Budapesti Előre SC	34	13	10	11	35	37	−2	36	
7	Budapesti Spartacus SC	34	14	7	13	45	43	+2	35	
8	Ganz-MÁVAG SE	34	11	12	11	43	41	+2	34	
9	Várpalotai Bányász SK	34	11	11	12	35	48	−13	33	
10	Pécsi Bányász SE	34	12	8	14	38	37	+1	32	
11	Kecskeméti Dózsa	34	12	8	14	39	41	−2	32	
12	Miskolci VSC	34	11	10	13	29	50	−21	32	
13	Budafoki MTE Kinizsi	34	8	15	11	40	46	−6	31	
14	Nyíregyházi Spartacus	34	11	9	14	36	45	−9	31	
15	Ózdi Kohász SE	34	9	13	12	36	50	−14	31	
16	Dorogi Bányász SC	34	11	8	15	46	46	0	30	Relegation to Nemzeti Bajnokság III
17	Fővárosi Autóbusz SK	34	7	7	20	25	55	−30	21	Relegation to Nemzeti Bajnokság III
18	Debreceni VSC	34	7	6	21	34	69	−35	20	Relegation to Nemzeti Bajnokság III

== See also ==
- 1967 Magyar Kupa
- 1967 Nemzeti Bajnokság I
- 1967 Nemzeti Bajnokság III
