= Nagybátonyi SC =

Hungarian football club

- Full name: Nagybátonyi Sport Club
- Founded: 17 March 1925
- Ground: Nagybátonyi Sporttelep
- League: Megyei Bajnokság I
- Website: https://www.nbsc.hu/
Home colours

Nagybátonyi Sport Club is a football club based in Bátonyterenye, Nógrád County, Hungary, that competes in the Megyei Bajnokság I, the fourth tier of Hungarian football.

== History ==
The inaugural general meeting held on March 17, 1925, established one of Nógrád County’s oldest sports clubs, the Nagybátony-Bányatelepi Olvasó és Sportegyletet. The newly formed club was backed by the Nagybátony Újlak egyesült Iparművek Rt. (in English: Nagybátony Újlak United Industrial Works, Ltd). The green-and-reds (as those were the team’s colors in the early days) elected Sándor Sallai as their first president, and membership was granted only after meeting strict criteria. It was only natural that soccer became the favorite pastime of the miners, who performed such hard labor.

After World War II, the Nagybátonyi Bányász Sport Club was founded. However, the beloved name “NOSE” remained inextricably linked to soccer in Bátony. The team’s colors also changed to black and white at this time. Financed by the Nógrád Mining Trust, the team—often referred to as the “little brother” of “Stécé”—typically competed in the Nemzeti Bajnokság leagues. The 1967 squad, led by coach Róbert Dávid, even stood on the threshold of Nemzeti Bajnokság I, but at the end of the season, it slipped out of the spots that would have secured promotion to NB I/B. According to “small-town legend,” this was because the Nógrád Coal Mines could not afford to support two Nemzeti Bajnokság I teams, since their “big brother,” Salgótarjáni Kohász SE, was already competing there.

Starting in the 1990s, as the coal mining industry declined, the team also fell on hard times. In 1990, it was relegated from Nemzeti Bajnokság III; in 1992, it dropped the “Bányász” (Miner) from its name, and since then has competed as Nagybátonyi SC in the county’s first division with mixed success. In the early 2000s, the team was on the brink of relegation, but a draw against its city rival, Kisterenye, in the final round ultimately saved it from being relegated to Megyei Bajnokság II. Since then, the team has been fighting to return to a higher division, coming closest to promotion in 2008. Nagybátony has always been considered a great youth development club (national team players such as József Kardos of Újpest FC and István Kovács of Vasas came from here), and its current team is built largely around homegrown players.

== Name changes ==
- 1925–1949 Nagybátony-Bányatelepi Olvasó és Sportegylet
- 1947: merger with Nagybátonyi OSE Barátság
- 1949–1951: Nagybátonyi Tárna
- 1951–1992: Nagybátonyi Bányász Sport Club
- 1970: meger with Szorospataki Bányász
- 1992–present: Nagybátonyi SC

== Honours ==
- Nemzeti Bajnokság III:
  - Winners (5): 1958–59, 1962–63, 1967, 1974–75, 1981–82

== Seasons ==
The table below shows the seasons of Nagybátonyi SC.

Season	Tier	Club's name	Position	Pts
1938–39	4	Nagybátonyi OSE	4 / 9	21
1939–40	4	Nagybátonyi OSE	3 / 10	26
1940–41	5	Nagybátonyi OSE	4 / 8	15
1941–42	5	Nagybátonyi OSE	0 / 12	
1942–43	5	Nagybátonyi OSE	3 / 9	11
1943–44	4	Nagybátonyi OSE	9 / 10	14
1945–46	2	Nagybátonyi OSE	0 / 15	
1946–47	3	Nagybátonyi OSE	12 / 13	15
1947–48	4	Nagybátonyi OSE	0 / 14	
1948–49	4	Nagybátonyi OSE	2 / 16	
1949–50	3	Nagybátonyi Tárna	9 / 16	30
1950	3	Nagybátonyi Tárna	14 / 16	10
1951	3	Nagybátonyi Bányász	4 / 16	39
1952	3	Nagybátonyi Bányász	1 / 14	38
1953	2	Nagybátonyi Bányász	14 / 16	19
1954	2	Nagybátonyi Bányász	8 / 16	34
1955	3	Nagybátonyi Bányász	1 / 16	53
1956	2	Nagybátonyi Bányász	15 / 16	16
1957–58	2	Nagybátonyi Bányász	12 / 19	35
1958–59	3	Nagybátonyi Bányász	1 / 16	44
1959–60	2	Nagybátonyi Bányász SC	14 / 16	22
1960–61	3	Nagybátonyi Bányász	3 / 16	36
1961–62	3	Nagybátonyi Bányász	2 / 16	42
1962–63	3	Nagybátonyi Bányász	1 / 16	46
1963	3	Nagybátonyi Bányász	10 / 18	16
1964	3	Nagybátonyi Bányász	10 / 18	31
1965	3	Nagybátonyi Bányász	9 / 18	34
1966	3	Nagybátonyi Bányász	5 / 18	39
1967	3	Nagybátonyi Bányász	1 / 16	44
1968	2	Nagybátonyi Bányász	5 / 18	38
1969	2	Nagybátonyi Bányász	18 / 18	20
1970	3	Nagybátonyi Bányász	11 / 16	13
1970–71	3	Nagybátonyi Bányász	2 / 16	39
1971–72	3	Nagybátonyi Bányász	2 / 16	39
1972–73	3	Nagybátonyi Bányász	10 / 16	30
1973–74	3	Nagybátonyi Bányász	11 / 16	25
1974–75	3	Nagybátonyi Bányász	1 / 20	53
1975–76	2	Nagybátonyi Bányász	20 / 20	21
1976–77	3	Nagybátonyi Bányász	12 / 20	33
1977–78	4	Nagybátonyi Bányász	1 / 16	47
1978–79	3	Nagybátonyi Bányász	2 / 18	55
1979–80	3	Nagybátonyi Bányász	1 / 18	64
1980–81	2	Nagybátonyi Bányász	17 / 20	30
1981–82	3	Nagybátonyi Bányász	1 / 16	43
1982–83	2	Nagybátonyi Bányász	20 / 20	20
1983–84	3	Nagybátonyi Bányász	11 / 16	28
1984–85	3	Nagybátonyi Bányász	5 / 16	34
1985–86	3	Nagybátonyi Bányász	9 / 17	33
1986–87	3	Nagybátonyi Bányász	9 / 16	31
1987–88	3	Nagybátonyi Bányász	12 / 16	26
1988–89	3	Nagybátonyi Bányász	13 / 16	38
1989–90	3	Nagybátony	16 / 16	9
1990–91	4	Nagybátony	10 / 16	24
1991–92	4	Nagybátony	5 / 12	23
1992–93	4	Nagybátony	7 / 12	20
1993–94	4	Nagybátony	6 / 12	25
1993–94	4	Nagybátony	11 / 23	
1994–95	4	Nagybátony SC	7 / 18	51
1995–96	4	Nagybátony SC	4 / 16	43
1996–97	4	Nagybátony	12 / 16	29
1997–98	5	Nagybátony	5 / 16	50
1998–99	5	Nagybátony	11 / 16	33
1999–00	5	Nagybátony	10 / 16	38
2000–01	5	Nagybátony	11 / 16	37
2001–02	5	Nagybátony	11 / 17	39
2002–03	5	Nagybátony	12 / 16	31
2003–04	5	Nagybátony	8 / 16	48
2004–05	5	Nagybátony	7 / 16	46
2005–06	4	Nagybátony	2 / 18	76
2006–07	4	Nagybátony	3 / 12	42
2006–07	4	Nagybátony	7 / 24	7
2007–08	4	Nagybátony SC	2 / 23	3
2007–08	4	Nagybátonyi SC	1 / 12	57
2008–09	4	Nagybátonyi SC	8 / 18	50
2009–10	4	Nagybátony SC	4 / 16	52
2010–11	4	Nagybátonyi SC	8 / 14	38
2011–12	4	Nagybátonyi SC	1 / 14	61
2012–13	3	Nagybátonyi SC	13 / 14	16
2013–14	4	Nagybátonyi SC	10 / 16	33
2014–15	4	Nagybátony SC	11 / 14	27
2015–16	4	Nagybátony SC	14 / 14	9
2016–17	4	Nagybátony SC	0 / 14	
2017–18	6	Nagybátonyi SC	5 / 11	19
2018–19	6	Nagybátonyi SC	12 / 13	
