= Szolnoki MÁV FC =

Hungarian football club

Szolnok
- Full name: Szolnoki Magyar Államvasutak Futball Club
- Founded: 11 May 1910; 116 years ago
- Ground: Tiszaligeti Stadion, Szolnok
- Capacity: 4,000
- Chairman: Sándor Földi
- Manager: Csaba Horváth
- League: NB III; Southeast
- 2023–24: NB III; Southeast, 5th of 16
- Website: szolnokimavfc.hu
| Home colours | Away colours |

Szolnoki MÁV FC is a Hungarian football club, from the city of Szolnok. In 2010 it gained promotion to the National Championship.

== Crest and colours ==
The colours of the club are blue and white.

=== Manufacturers and shirt sponsors ===
The following table shows in detail Szolnoki MÁV FC kit manufacturers and shirt sponsors by year:

| Period | Kit manufacturer | Shirt sponsor |
|---|---|---|
| 2010–2011 | hummel | AC-DC |
| 2011–2012 | hummel | Juvenal Kft. |
| 2012–2013 | hummel | – |
| 2014 | hummel | Stadler |
| 2015– | hummel | Szolnok |

== Current squad ==
As of 14 February 2022.

Note: Flags indicate national team as defined under FIFA eligibility rules; some limited exceptions apply. Players may hold more than one non-FIFA nationality.

| No. | Pos. | Nation | Player |
|---|---|---|---|
| 2 | DF | HUN | Ádám Rokszin |
| 3 | DF | HUN | Gergő Gohér |
| 4 | DF | HUN | Alex Szabó (on loan from Honvéd II) |
| 5 | MF | HUN | Zoltán Sipos |
| 6 | DF | HUN | Kálmán Tisza |
| 7 | DF | HUN | Csaba Lakatos |
| 8 | MF | HUN | Patrik Pelles |
| 9 | MF | HUN | László Tóth |
| 11 | FW | HUN | Bence Busa |
| 12 | GK | HUN | Péter Kovács (on loan from Debrecen) |
| 13 | FW | HUN | Levente Kurdics |
| 14 | FW | HUN | István Lakatos |
| 15 | MF | HUN | Olivér Kovács |

| No. | Pos. | Nation | Player |
|---|---|---|---|
| 16 | FW | HUN | Bálint Tömösvári |
| 17 | MF | HUN | Márk Kónya |
| 18 | MF | HUN | Tamás Hleba |
| 19 | FW | HUN | Raul Csörgő (on loan from Nyíregyháza) |
| 21 | FW | HUN | Gábor Antal |
| 22 | FW | HUN | Dávid Irmes |
| 23 | DF | HUN | Tamás Szekszárdi |
| 24 | DF | HUN | Szilárd Papp |
| 25 | DF | HUN | László Sitku |
| 26 | DF | HUN | Bence Tóth (on loan from Vasas) |
| 27 | MF | HUN | Marcell Földi |
| 28 | GK | HUN | Lajos Hegedűs |

=== Out on loan ===
Note: Flags indicate national team as defined under FIFA eligibility rules; some limited exceptions apply. Players may hold more than one non-FIFA nationality.

| No. / Pos. / Nation / Player; — / GK / HUN / Kálmán Csáki (at Törökszentmiklós) | No. / Pos. / Nation / Player; — / MF / HUN / Milán Iván (at Dabas–Gyón) |

== Honours ==
- Nemzeti Bajnokság II:
  - Winners (2): 1937–38, 2009–10
- Nemzeti Bajnokság III:
  - Winners (7): 1957–58, 1962–63, 1967, 1975–76, 1982–83, 1995–96, 2018–19
- Hungarian Cup:
  - Winners (1): 1940–41

== Seasons ==
The table below shows the seasons of Szolnoki MÁV FC.

| Season | Tier | Club's name | Position | Pts |
|---|---|---|---|---|
| 1911–12 | 2 | Szolnoki MÁV SE | 4 / 5 | 2 |
| 1912–13 | 2 | Szolnoki MÁV SE | 3 / 6 | |
| 1913–14 | 2 | Szolnoki MÁV SE | 1 / 7 | 17 |
| 1917–18 | 2 | Szolnoki MÁV SE | 1 / 10 | |
| 1918–19 | 2 | Szolnoki MÁV SE | 1 / 4 | |
| 1919–20 | 2 | Szolnoki MÁV SE | 1 / 6 | |
| 1919–20 | 2 | Szolnoki MÁV SE | 2 / 6 | 7 |
| 1920–21 | 2 | Szolnoki MÁV SE | 10 / 10 | - |
| 1921–22 | 2 | Szolnoki MÁV SE | 2 / 10 | 17 |
| 1922–23 | 2 | Szolnoki MÁV SE | 2 / 10 | 22 |
| 1923–24 | 2 | Szolnoki MÁV SE | 2 / 8 | 22 |
| 1924–25 | 2 | Szolnoki MÁV SE | 1 / 8 | 18 |
| 1925–26 | 2 | Szolnoki MÁV SE | 1 / 8 | 23 |
| 1926–27 | 2 | Szolnoki MÁV SE | 1 / 9 | 27 |
| 1927–28 | 2 | Szolnoki MÁV SE | 2 / 12 | 33 |
| 1928–29 | 2 | Szolnoki MÁV SE | 1 / 12 | 40 |
| 1929–30 | 2 | Szolnoki MÁV SE | 1 / 8 | 26 |
| 1930–31 | 2 | Szolnoki MÁV SE | 1 / 8 | 21 |
| 1931–32 | 2 | Szolnoki MÁV SE | 2 / 10 | 28 |
| 1932–33 | 2 | Szolnoki MÁV | 2 / 14 | |
| 1933–34 | 2 | Szolnoki MÁV SE | 2 / 12 | 32 |
| 1934–35 | 2 | Szolnoki MÁV SE | 2 / 12 | 33 |
| 1935–36 | 2 | Szolnoki MÁV SE | 1 / 12 | 39 |
| 1936–37 | 2 | Szolnoki MÁV SE | 3 / 12 | 33 |
| 1937–38 | 2 | Szolnoki MÁV | 1 / 14 | 43 |
| 1938–39 | 1 | Szolnoki MÁV SE | 9 / 14 | 23 |
| 1939–40 | 1 | Szolnoki MÁV SE | 9 / 14 | 23 |
| 1940–41 | 1 | Szolnoki MÁV SE | 4 / 14 | 31 |
| 1941–42 | 1 | Szolnoki MÁV SE | 3 / 16 | 41 |
| 1942–43 | 1 | Szolnoki MÁV SE | 8 / 16 | 32 |
| 1943–44 | 1 | Szolnoki MÁV SE | 8 / 16 | 30 |
| 1944–45 | 2 | Szolnoki MÁV SE | 12 / 16 | 2 |
| 1944–45 | 1 | Szolnoki MÁV SE | 15 / 16 | 0 |
| 1945–46 | 1 | Szolnoki MÁV SE | 13 / 10 | 20 |
| 1945–46 | 1 | Szolnoki MÁV SE | 10 / 14 | 24 |
| 1946–47 | 1 | Szolnoki MÁV SE | 10 / 16 | 29 |
| 1947–48 | 1 | Szolnoki MÁV SE | 15 / 17 | 21 |
| 1948–49 | 2 | Szolnoki Lokomotív | 2 / 16 | 46 |
| 1949–50 | 2 | Szolnoki Lokomotív | 2 / 16 | 46 |
| 1950 | 2 | Szolnoki Lokomotív | 2 / 16 | 21 |
| 1951 | 2 | Szolnoki Lokomotív | 4 / 14 | 28 |
| 1952 | 2 | Szolnoki Lokomotív | 6 / 18 | 36 |
| 1953 | 2 | Szolnoki Lokomotív | 8 / 16 | 28 |
| 1954 | 2 | Szolnoki Lokomotív | 8 / 16 | 32 |
| 1955 | 3 | Szolnoki Törekvés | 1 / 17 | 57 |
| 1956 | 2 | Szolnoki MÁV | 7 / 16 | 34 |
| 1957–58 | 2 | Szolnoki MÁV SE | 5 / 19 | 40 |
| 1958–59 | 2 | Szolnoki MÁV SE | 12 / 16 | 26 |
| 1959–60 | 2 | Szolnoki MÁV SE | 8 / 16 | 31 |
| 1960–61 | 2 | Szolnoki MÁV SE | 2 / 16 | 40 |
| 1961–62 | 2 | Szolnoki MÁV SE | 9 / 16 | 29 |
| 1962–63 | 2 | Szolnoki MÁV | 11 / 16 | 26 |
| 1963 | 3 | Szolnoki MÁV SE | 15 / 18 | 12 |
| 1964 | 3 | Szolnoki MÁV SE | 7 / 18 | 36 |
| 1965 | 3 | Szolnoki MÁV SE | 6 / 18 | 39 |
| 1966 | 3 | Szolnoki MÁV SE | 4 / 18 | 46 |
| 1967 | 3 | Szolnoki MÁV SE | 7 / 16 | 30 |
| 1968 | 3 | Szolnoki MÁV SE | 2 / 16 | 39 |
| 1969 | 3 | Szolnoki MÁV SE | 7 / 16 | 33 |
| 1970 | 3 | Szolnoki MÁV SE | 1 / 16 | 24 |
| 1970–71 | 3 | Szolnoki MÁV SE | 9 / 16 | 29 |
| 1971–72 | 3 | Szolnoki MÁV SE | 9 / 16 | 28 |
| 1972–73 | 3 | Szolnoki MÁV SE | 14 / 16 | 24 |
| 1973–74 | 3 | Szolnoki MÁV SE | 15 / 16 | 20 |
| 1974–75 | 3 | Szolnoki MÁV | 3 / 20 | 53 |
| 1975–76 | 3 | Szolnoki MÁV | 1 / 20 | 60 |
| 1976–77 | 2 | Szolnoki MÁV | 20 / 20 | 22 |
| 1977–78 | 3 | Szolnoki MÁV | 14 / 20 | 33 |
| 1978–79 | 2 | Szolnoki MÁV | 16 / 20 | 31 |
| 1979–80 | 2 | Szolnoki MÁV MTE | 2 / 20 | 43 |
| 1980–81 | 2 | Szolnoki MÁV-MTE | 13 / 20 | 38 |
| 1981–82 | 2 | Szolnoki MÁV MTE | 9 / 16 | 28 |
| 1982–83 | 3 | Szolnoki MÁV MTE | 1 / 16 | 44 |
| 1983–84 | 2 | Szolnoki MÁV MTE | 7 / 20 | 39 |
| 1984–85 | 2 | Szolnoki MÁV MTE | 8 / 20 | 41 |
| 1985–86 | 2 | Szolnoki MÁV MTE | 12 / 20 | 36 |
| 1986–87 | 2 | Szolnoki MÁV MTE | 7 / 20 | 39 |
| 1987–88 | 2 | Szolnoki MÁV MTE | 4 / 20 | 44 |
| 1988–89 | 2 | Szolnoki MÁV MTE | 7 / 16 | 44 |
| 1989–90 | 2 | Szolnoki MÁV MTE | 11 / 16 | 39 |
| 1990–91 | 2 | Szolnoki MÁV MTE | 14 / 16 | 23 |
| 1991–92 | 2 | Szolnoki MÁV MTE | 16 / 16 | 15 |
| 1992–93 | 3 | Szolnoki MÁV MTE | 5 / 16 | 38 |
| 1993–94 | 3 | Szolnoki MÁV MTE | 3 / 16 | 37 |
| 1994–95 | 3 | Szolnoki MÁV MTE | 5 / 16 | 53 |
| 1995–96 | 3 | Szolnoki MÁV SE | 1 / 16 | 73 |
| 1996–97 | 2 | Szolnoki MÁV-Neusiedler | 6 / 16 | 45 |
| 1997–98 | 2 | Szolnoki MÁV - Neusiedler | 17 / 20 | 42 |
| 1998–99 | 2 | Szolnoki MÁV - Neusiedler | 9 / 20 | 53 |
| 1999–00 | 2 | Szolnoki MÁV - Neusiedler | 8 / 20 | 59 |
| 2000 | 2 | Szolnoki MÁV FC | 1 / 7 | 29 |
| 2000–01 | 2 | Szolnoki MÁV FC | 4 / 12 | 29 |
| 2001–02 | 2 | Szolnoki MÁV FC | 3 / 12 | 54 |
| 2001–02 | 2 | Szolnoki MÁV FC | 3 / 12 | 36 |
| 2002–03 | 2 | Szolnoki MÁV FC | 9 / 20 | 48 |
| 2003–04 | 2 | Szolnoki MÁV FC | 15 / 18 | 37 |
| 2004–05 | 2 | Szolnoki MÁV FC | 6 / 14 | 36 |
| 2005–06 | 2 | Szolnoki MÁV FC | 2 / 16 | 49 |
| 2006–07 | 2 | Szolnoki MÁV FC | 4 / 16 | 49 |
| 2007–08 | 2 | Szolnoki MÁV FC - Mondi | 2 / 16 | 63 |
| 2008–09 | 2 | Szolnoki MÁV FC - Mondi | 6 / 16 | 47 |
| 2009–10 | 2 | Szolnoki MÁV FC | 1 / 15 | 60 |
| 2010–11 | 1 | Szolnoki MÁV FC | 16 / 16 | 21 |
| 2011–12 | 2 | Szolnoki MÁV FC | 2 / 16 | 55 |
| 2012–13 | 2 | Szolnoki MÁV FC | 6 / 16 | 48 |
| 2013–14 | 2 | Szolnoki MÁV-Stadler Rail FC | 12 / 16 | 36 |
| 2014–15 | 2 | Szolnoki MÁV FC | 6 / 16 | 46 |
| 2015–16 | 2 | Szolnoki MÁV FC | 13 / 16 | 31 |
| 2016–17 | 2 | Szolnoki MÁV FC | 10 / 20 | 52 |
| 2017–18 | 2 | Szolnoki MÁV FC | 18 / 20 | 42 |
| 2018–19 | 3 | Szolnoki MÁV FC | 1 / 16 | 65 |
| 2019–20 | 2 | Szolnoki MÁV FC | 16 / 20 | 31 |
| 2020–21 | 2 | Szolnoki MÁV FC | 9 / 20 | 57 |
| 2021–22 | 2 | Szolnoki MÁV FC | 18 / 20 | 38 |
| 2022–23 | 3 | Szolnoki MÁV FC | 12 / 20 | 41 |
| 2023–24 | 3 | Szolnoki MÁV FC | 6 / 16 | 49 |
| 2024–25 | 3 | Szolnoki MÁV FC | 15 / 16 | 25 |
| 2025–26 | 4 | Szolnoki MÁV FC | 1 / 16 | 83 |

== Manager history ==
- (Hungary) Károly Kis (Dec 11, 2012 – Oct 26, 2015)
- (Hungary) József Csábi (Oct 26, 2015 –)
