= Győri Dózsa SE =

Hungarian football club

- Full name: Győri Dózsa SE
- Founded: 1945
- Dissolved: 2012
Home colours

Győri Dózsa SE is a defunct professional football club based in Győr, Győr–Moson–Sopron County, Hungary.

== History ==
Győri Dózsa SE won the Northwestern group of the 1962–63 Nemzeti Bajnokság III season. However, the club did not gain promotion to the second division. Győri Dózsa could repeat their success in the 1967 by winning the 1967 Nemzeti Bajnokság III season. This time, the club spent two consecutive seasons in the second tier, followed by a relegation in the 1969 Nemzeti Bajnokság II season.

== Name changes ==
- 1951 - 1957: Győri Dózsa SK
- 1957 - 1959: Győri II. kerületi Dózsa SK
- 1959 - 1994: Győri Dózsa SK
- 1994 - 1997: Győri Dózsa-Horváth Gumi SE
- 1997? - 2012: Győri Dózsa SE

== Honours ==
=== League ===
- Nemzeti Bajnokság III:
  - Winners (1): 1962–63

== Seasons ==
The table below shows the seasons of Győri Dózsa SE.

| Season | Tier | Club's name | Position | Pts |
|---|---|---|---|---|
| 1951 | 4 | Győri Dózsa | 0 / 8 | |
| 1952 | 4 | Győri Dózsa | 2 / 12 | 36 |
| 1955 | 3 | Győri Dózsa | 13 / 14 | 17 |
| 1956 | 4 | Győri Dózsa SK | 0 / 14 | |
| 1957 | 4 | II. kerületi Dózsa | 2 / 7 | |
| 1957–58 | 4 | II. kerületi Dózsa SK | 3 / 16 | 44 |
| 1958–59 | 4 | II. ker. Dózsa | 1 / 16 | 42 |
| 1959–60 | 3 | Győri Dózsa SK | 6 / 17 | 34 |
| 1960–61 | 3 | Győri Dózsa | 5 / 16 | 34 |
| 1961–62 | 3 | Győri Dózsa | 3 / 16 | 42 |
| 1962–63 | 3 | Győri Dózsa | 1 / 16 | 46 |
| 1963 | 3 | Győri Dózsa | 11 / 18 | 15 |
| 1964 | 3 | Győri Dózsa | 7 / 18 | 36 |
| 1965 | 3 | Győri Dózsa | 14 / 18 | 30 |
| 1966 | 3 | Győri Dózsa | 8 / 18 | 36 |
| 1967 | 3 | Győri Dózsa SK | 1 / 16 | 41 |
| 1968 | 2 | Győri Dózsa SK | 12 / 18 | 33 |
| 1969 | 2 | Győri Dózsa | 16 / 18 | 28 |
| 1970 | 3 | Győri Dózsa SK | 4 / 16 | 17 |
| 1970–71 | 3 | Győri Dózsa SK | 4 / 16 | 37 |
| 1971–72 | 3 | Győri Dózsa | 3 / 16 | 34 |
| 1972–73 | 3 | Győri Dózsa | 2 / 16 | 36 |
| 1973–74 | 3 | Győri Dózsa | 10 / 16 | 29 |
| 1974–75 | 3 | Győri Dózsa | 18 / 20 | 30 |
| 1975–76 | 4 | Győri Dózsa | 1 / 16 | 48 |
| 1976–77 | 3 | Győri Dózsa | 11 / 20 | 41 |
| 1977–78 | 4 | Győri Dózsa | 2 / 18 | 49 |
| 1978–79 | 3 | Győri Dózsa | 1 / 18 | 65 |
| 1979–80 | 2 | Győri Dózsa SC | 19 / 20 | 29 |
| 1980–81 | 3 | Győri Dózsa SK | 2 / 18 | 49 |
| 1981–82 | 3 | Győri Dózsa | 3 / 18 | 44 |
| 1982–83 | 3 | Győri Dózsa | 11 / 18 | 33 |
| 1983–84 | 3 | Győri Dózsa SK | 8 / 18 | 35 |
| 1984–85 | 3 | Győri Dózsa | 17 / 18 | 18 |
| 1985–86 | 4 | Győri Dózsa | 1 / 16 | 46 |
| 1986–87 | 3 | Győri Dózsa | 15 / 18 | 29 |
| 1987–88 | 4 | Győri Dózsa | 1 / 16 | 54 |
| 1988–89 | 3 | Győri Dózsa | 9 / 16 | 42 |
| 1989–90 | 3 | Győri Dózsa | 3 / 16 | 61 |
| 1990–91 | 3 | Győri Dózsa | 6 / 16 | 33 |
| 1991–92 | 3 | Győri Dózsa | 3 / 16 | 38 |
| 1992–93 | 3 | Győri Dózsa SE | 8 / 16 | 27 |
| 1993–94 | 3 | Győri Dózsa SE | 9 / 16 | 29 |
| 1994–95 | 3 | Győri Dózsa Horváth Gumi SE | 13 / 16 | 32 |
| 1995–96 | 3 | Győri Dózsa-Horváth Gumi SE | 11 / 16 | 36 |
| 1996–97 | 3 | Győri Dózsa-Horváth Gumi | 5 / 16 | 54 |
| 1997–98 | 3 | Győri Dózsa | 5 / 16 | 48 |
| 1998–99 | 5 | Győri Dózsa | 14 / 18 | 38 |
| 1999–00 | 5 | Győri Dózsa | 2 / 18 | 76 |
| 2000–01 | 5 | Győri Dózsa | 4 / 18 | 70 |
| 2001–02 | 5 | Győri Dózsa | 2 / 16 | 63 |
| 2002–03 | 5 | Győri Dózsa | 4 / 16 | 56 |
| 2003–04 | 5 | Győri Dózsa | 5 / 16 | 47 |
| 2004–05 | 5 | Győri Dózsa | 2 / 16 | 63 |
| 2005–06 | 4 | Győri Dózsa SE | 5 / 16 | 49 |
| 2006–07 | 4 | Győri Dózsa SE | 9 / 16 | 42 |
| 2007–08 | 4 | Győri Dózsa SE | 15 / 16 | 26 |
| 2008–09 | 5 | Győri Dózsa SE | 16 / 16 | - |
| 2010–11 | 6 | Győri Dózsa SE | 4 / 13 | 49 |
| 2011–12 | 6 | Győri Dózsa SE | 8 / 16 | 42 |
