= Kaposvári Honvéd SE =

Hungarian football club

- Full name: Kaposvári Honvéd SE
- Founded: 1957
- Ground: Pécsi utcai stadion
- Website: https://kaposvarihonved.hu/
Home colours

Kaposvári Honvéd SE is a defunct professional football club based in Kaposvár, Somogy County, Hungary.

== History ==
Kaposvári Honvéd won the 1965 Nemzeti Bajnokság III season and were promoted to the second division. However, they finished in the 15th position in the 1966 Nemzeti Bajnokság II season and thus they were relegated.

== Name changes ==
- Kaposvári Honvéd SE: 1952 – 1968
- Honvéd Táncsics SE: 1968 – 1988
- Kaposvári Honvéd SE: 1988 – 1994

== Seasons ==
The table below shows the seasons of Kaposvári Honvéd SE.

Season	Tier	Club's name	Position	Pts
1952	4	Kaposvári Honvéd	12 / 12	-
1954	4	Kaposvári Honvéd	2 / 12	28
1956	4	Kaposvári Honvéd	5 / 8	11
1957–58	5	Kaposvári Honvéd	0 / 14	26
1958–59	5	Kaposvári Honvéd	1 / 9	17
1959–60	4	Kaposvári Honvéd	1 / 16	44
1960–61	3	Kaposvári Honvéd	15 / 16	16
1961–62	4	Kaposvári Honvéd	1 / 18	52
1962–63	3	Kaposvári Honvéd	2 / 16	43
1963	3	Kaposvári Honvéd	5 / 18	20
1964	3	Kaposvári Honvéd	3 / 18	43
1965	3	Kaposvári Honvéd SE	1 / 18	46
1966	2	Kaposvári Honvéd	15 / 16	25
1967	3	Kaposvári Táncsis SE	4 / 16	34
1968	3	Honvéd Táncsics SE	7 / 16	30
1969	3	Honvéd Táncsics SE	13 / 16	27
1970	3	Honvéd Táncsics SE	5 / 16	16
1970–71	3	Honvéd Táncsics SE	8 / 16	32
1971–72	3	Honvéd Táncsics SE	8 / 16	29
1972–73	3	Honvéd Táncsics SE	7 / 16	30
1973–74	3	Honvéd Táncsics SE	7 / 16	30
1974–75	3	Honvéd Táncsics SE	9 / 20	39
1975–76	3	Honvéd Táncsics SE	16 / 20	27
1976–77	4	Honvéd Táncsics SE	1 / 16	55
1977–78	4	Honvéd Táncsics SE	1 / 18	55
1978–79	3	Honvéd Táncsics SE	1 / 18	56
1979–80	3	Honvéd Táncsics SE	3 / 16	44
1980–81	3	Honvéd Táncsics SE	2 / 16	46
1981–82	3	Honvéd Táncsics SE	9 / 16	29
1982–83	3	Honvéd Táncsics SE	9 / 16	30
1983–84	3	Honvéd Táncsics SE	13 / 16	26
1984–85	3	Honvéd Táncsics SE	10 / 16	29
1985–86	3	Honvéd Táncsics SE	8 / 16	28
1986–87	3	Honvéd Táncsics SE	13 / 16	28
1987–88	3	Honvéd Táncsics SE	4 / 16	34
1988–89	3	Kaposvári Honvéd	4 / 16	57
1989–90	3	Kaposvári Honvéd SE	3 / 16	48
1990–91	3	Kaposvári Honvéd	4 / 16	32
1991–92	3	Kaposvári Honvéd SE	12 / 16	25
1992–93	3	Kaposvári Honvéd SE	5 / 16	31
1993–94	3	Kaposvári Honvéd SE	11 / 16	27
