= Budapesti Spartacus SC =

Hungarian football club

- Full name: Budapesti Spartacus Sport Club
- Founded: 1952
- Ground: Kőér utca
Home colours	Away colours

Budapesti Spartacus Sport Club was a football club from the town of Kőbánya, Budapest, Hungary.

== History ==
The club's biggest achievement was a second place in the 1955 Nemzeti Bajnokság II and the 1970 Nemzeti Bajnokság II seasons.

== Grounds ==
Budapesti Spartacus played their home matches in Kőér utca, located in Kőbánya, Budapest.

- Kőér utca: (? – 1981)
- Kőér utca, Földes Edzőpálya: (? – ?)
- Kőér utca, Salakos Edzőpálya: (? – ?)

== Name changes ==
- EKISz: ? – 1950.07.25.
- OKISz: 1950.07.25. – 1952
- Budapesti Spartacus Sport Club: 1952 – 1981.július 31.
- in 1968 merger with Budai Spartacus

== Honours ==
=== League ===
- Nemzeti Bajnokság II:
  - Runners-up (2): 1955, 1970
  - Third place (2): 1957, 1957–58
- Nemzeti Bajnokság III:
  - Winners (1): 1966

== Famous footballers ==
- (Hungary) Ferenc Deák: the 8th top goalscorer of all time in football history.

== See also ==
List of footballers with 500 or more goals
