= 1971–72 Nemzeti Bajnokság III =

Nemzeti Bajnokság III
- Season: 1971–72
- Champions: Szekszárdi Dózsa SE (West); Miskolci VSC (North); BKV Előre SC (East)
- Promoted: Szekszárdi Dózsa SE (West); Miskolci VSC (North); BKV Előre SC (East)

The 1971–72 Nemzeti Bajnokság III season was the 1st edition of the Nemzeti Bajnokság III.

== League tables ==
=== Western group ===
Pos	Teams	Pld	W	D	L	GF	GA	GD	Pts	Promotion or relegation
1	Szekszárdi Dózsa SE	30	19	8	3	50	20	30	46	Promotion to Nemzeti Bajnokság II
2	NIKE Fűzfői AK	30	12	12	6	44	32	12	36	
3	Győri Dózsa SK	30	14	6	10	49	42	7	34	
4	Savaria Cipőgyár SE	30	14	6	10	48	43	5	34	
5	Pécsi Ércbányász SC	30	12	8	10	35	27	8	32	
6	Pápai Textiles	30	11	10	9	42	40	2	32	
7	Bakony Vegyész TC	30	11	8	11	40	42	-2	30	
8	Honvéd Táncsics SE	30	12	5	13	44	40	4	29	
9	Pécsi VSK	30	11	6	13	44	36	8	28	
10	KOMÉP SC	30	10	8	12	28	34	-6	28	
11	Székesfehérvári MÁV Előre SC	30	11	5	14	47	45	2	27	
12	Nagykanizsai Olajbányász SE	30	10	7	13	34	45	-11	27	
13	Zalaegerszegi Dózsa	30	8	11	11	35	51	-16	27	
14	Ajkai Bányász SK	30	7	12	11	21	36	-15	26	Relegation to Megyei Bajnokság I
15	Tapolcai Bauxitbányász SE	30	9	7	14	42	45	-3	25	Relegation to Megyei Bajnokság I
16	Almásfüzítői Timföld	30	7	5	18	22	47	-25	19	Relegation to Megyei Bajnokság I

=== Northern group ===
Pos	Teams	Pld	W	D	L	GF	GA	GD	Pts	Promotion or relegation
1	Miskolci VSC	30	17	11	2	55	22	33	45	Promotion to Nemzeti Bajnokság II
2	Nagybátonyi Bányász SC	30	14	11	5	47	25	22	39	
3	Budapesti VSC	30	18	2	10	70	42	28	38	
4	Kazincbarcikai Vegyész SE	30	11	12	7	43	38	5	34	
5	Leninvárosi MTK	30	10	11	9	37	40	-3	31	
6	Vasas Izzó	30	11	9	10	37	41	-4	31	
7	Kossuth KFSE	30	10	10	10	34	33	1	30	
8	Kisterenyei Bányász Építők	30	10	8	12	42	45	-3	28	
9	Esztergomi Vasas	30	9	10	11	41	51	-10	28	
10	Váci Híradás SE	30	6	15	9	36	41	-5	27	
11	Sátoraljaújhelyi Spartacus	30	9	9	12	29	37	-8	27	
12	Nyíregyházi Spartacus	30	9	8	13	24	26	-2	26	
13	Gyöngyösi Spartacus	30	9	7	14	31	42	-11	25	
14	Rakamazi Spartacus	30	9	6	15	44	59	-15	24	Relegation to Megyei Bajnokság I
15	Vasas Ikarus SK	30	7	10	13	31	46	-15	24	Relegation to Megyei Bajnokság I
16	Salgótarjáni Kohász SE	30	5	13	12	42	55	-13	23	Relegation to Megyei Bajnokság I

=== Eastern group ===
Pos	Teams	Pld	W	D	L	GF	GA	GD	Pts	Promotion or relegation
1	BKV Előre SC	30	18	9	3	46	16	30	45	Promotion to Nemzeti Bajnokság II
2	Budafoki MTE Kinizsi	30	17	8	5	60	25	35	42	
3	Kiskunhalasi MEDOSZ	30	15	5	10	38	32	6	35	
4	KISTEXT SK	30	14	6	10	45	33	12	34	
5	Gyulai MEDOSZ	30	12	7	11	48	47	1	31	
6	Debreceni EAC	30	11	7	12	47	37	10	29	
7	Szegedi Dózsa	30	9	11	10	29	29	0	29	
8	Láng Vasas SK	30	9	10	11	41	39	2	28	
9	Szolnoki MÁV SE	30	10	8	12	43	45	-2	28	
10	Szegedi VSE	30	11	6	13	35	39	-4	28	
11	Ceglédi VSE	30	10	7	13	42	49	-7	27	
12	Budapesti Építők SC	30	9	9	12	26	36	-10	27	
13	MGM Debrecen	30	11	5	14	31	43	-12	27	
14	Budapesti Postás SE	30	9	6	15	31	51	-20	24	Relegation to Megyei Bajnokság I
15	Lehel SC	30	9	5	16	27	36	-9	23	Relegation to Megyei Bajnokság I
16	Szarvasi Főiskola Spartacus	30	9	5	16	30	62	-32	23	Relegation to Megyei Bajnokság I

== See also ==
- 1971–72 Magyar Kupa
- 1971–72 Nemzeti Bajnokság I
- 1971–72 Nemzeti Bajnokság II
