= 1969 Nemzeti Bajnokság III =

Nemzeti Bajnokság III
- Season: 1969
- Champions: MÁV DAC (West); Budapesti VSC (North); Debreceni VSC (East)
- Promoted: MÁV DAC (West); Budapesti VSC (North); Debreceni VSC (East)

The 1969 Nemzeti Bajnokság III season was the 1st edition of the Nemzeti Bajnokság III.

== League tables ==
=== Western group ===
Pos	Teams	Pld	W	D	L	GF	GA	GD	Pts	Promotion or relegation
1	MÁV DAC	30	17	8	5	49	21	28	42	Promotion to Nemzeti Bajnokság II
2	Savaria Cipőgyár SE	30	18	5	7	54	26	28	41	
3	Dorogi Bányász SC	30	13	10	7	50	31	19	36	
4	Pécsi Ércbányász SC	30	13	7	10	47	38	9	33	
5	Pápai Textiles SE	30	10	11	9	43	36	7	31	
6	Szekszárdi Dózsa SE	30	10	10	10	44	34	10	30	
7	Kaposvári Kinizsi	30	10	10	10	31	31	0	30	
8	Bauxitbányász SE	30	11	6	13	42	45	-3	28	
9	NIKE Fűzfői AK	30	7	14	9	25	32	-7	28	
10	Máza-Szászvári Bányász	30	11	6	13	42	65	-23	28	
11	Veszprémi Vegyész SC	30	9	9	12	42	45	-3	27	
12	Almásfüzítői Timföld SC	30	10	7	13	43	47	-4	27	
13	Honvéd Táncsics SE	30	8	11	11	32	36	-4	27	
14	Pécsi VSK	30	10	7	13	35	46	-11	27	Relegation to Megyei Bajnokság I
15	Siófoki Bányász SE	30	10	7	13	34	52	-18	27	Relegation to Megyei Bajnokság I
16	Nagykanizsai Olajbányász SE	30	5	8	17	25	53	-28	18	Relegation to Megyei Bajnokság I

=== Northern group ===
Pos	Teams	Pld	W	D	L	GF	GA	GD	Pts	Promotion or relegation
1	Budapesti VSC	30	16	9	5	61	26	35	41	Promotion to Nemzeti Bajnokság II
2	Volán SC	30	17	5	8	58	29	29	39	
3	Kossuth KFSE	30	16	6	8	52	37	15	38	
4	Kazincbarcikai Vegyész SE	30	15	7	8	59	38	21	37	
5	Esztergomi Vasas	30	13	10	7	57	36	21	36	
6	Vasas Izzó SK	30	12	10	8	44	27	17	34	
7	Nyíregyházi Spartacus SC	30	14	4	12	38	42	-4	32	
8	Sátoraljaújhelyi Spartacus	30	11	8	11	37	28	9	30	
9	Vasas Ikarus SK	30	12	6	12	43	50	-7	30	
10	Salgótarjáni Kohász SE	30	10	8	12	45	49	-4	28	
11	Kisterenyei Bányász	30	12	4	14	43	50	-7	28	
12	Borsodi Bányász	30	11	5	14	42	45	-3	27	
13	BEAC	30	9	9	12	46	52	-6	27	
14	Honvéd Papp József SE	30	8	6	16	42	59	-17	22	Relegation to Megyei Bajnokság I
15	Erzsébeti Vasas TK	30	7	8	15	42	62	-20	22	Relegation to Megyei Bajnokság I
16	Ormosbányai Bányász	30	2	5	23	31	110	-79	9	Relegation to Megyei Bajnokság I

=== Eastern group ===
Pos	Teams	Pld	W	D	L	GF	GA	GD	Pts	Promotion or relegation
1	Debreceni VSC	30	16	10	4	42	17	25	42	Promotion to Nemzeti Bajnokság II
2	Jászberényi Lehel SC	30	17	6	7	47	35	12	40	
3	Budafoki MTE Kinizsi	30	16	7	7	59	29	30	39	
4	Pénzügyőr SE	30	13	10	7	42	29	13	36	
5	KISTEXT SK	30	13	8	9	44	36	8	34	
6	Kiskunfélegyházi Vasas TK	30	13	7	10	48	46	2	33	
7	Szolnoki MÁV SE	30	13	7	10	44	44	0	33	
8	Gyulai MEDOSZ SE	30	10	11	9	39	30	9	31	
9	MGM Debrecen	30	10	10	10	42	33	9	30	
10	Szegedi VSE	30	11	8	11	36	37	-1	30	
11	Ceglédi VSE	30	11	6	13	51	44	7	28	
12	Szegedi Dózsa SK	30	10	7	13	43	41	2	27	
13	Honvéd Bocskai SE	30	8	9	13	48	58	-10	25	
14	Kecskeméti TE	30	8	7	15	38	51	-13	23	Relegation to Megyei Bajnokság I
15	Kőbányai Tűzálló	30	5	7	18	27	65	-38	17	Relegation to Megyei Bajnokság I
16	Mezőkovácsházi Petőfi	30	4	4	22	22	77	-55	12	Relegation to Megyei Bajnokság I

== See also ==
- 1969 Magyar Kupa
- 1969 Nemzeti Bajnokság I
- 1969 Nemzeti Bajnokság II
