= 1970–71 Nemzeti Bajnokság III =

Nemzeti Bajnokság III
- Season: 1970–71
- Champions: Dorogi Bányász SC (West); Volán SC (North); Pénzügyőr SE (East)
- Promoted: Dorogi Bányász SC (West); Volán SC (North); Pénzügyőr SE (East)

The 1970–71 Nemzeti Bajnokság III season was the 1st edition of the Nemzeti Bajnokság III.

== League tables ==
=== Western group ===
| Pos | Teams | Pld | W | D | L | GF | GA | GD | Pts | Promotion or relegation |
|---|---|---|---|---|---|---|---|---|---|---|
| 1 | Dorogi Bányász SC | 30 | 20 | 4 | 6 | 61 | 21 | 40 | 44 | Promotion to Nemzeti Bajnokság II |
| 2 | Szekszárdi Dózsa SE | 30 | 19 | 3 | 8 | 41 | 19 | 22 | 41 | |
| 3 | Pécsi Ércbányász SC | 30 | 17 | 5 | 8 | 68 | 25 | 43 | 39 | |
| 4 | Győri Dózsa SK | 30 | 14 | 9 | 7 | 49 | 30 | 19 | 37 | |
| 5 | Bauxitbányász SE | 30 | 14 | 6 | 10 | 53 | 46 | 7 | 34 | |
| 6 | Pápai Textiles | 30 | 14 | 6 | 10 | 33 | 31 | 2 | 34 | |
| 7 | Savaria Cipőgyár SE | 30 | 13 | 6 | 11 | 59 | 45 | 14 | 32 | |
| 8 | Honvéd Táncsics SE | 30 | 14 | 4 | 12 | 35 | 35 | 0 | 32 | |
| 9 | Bakony Vegyész TC | 30 | 12 | 7 | 11 | 38 | 34 | 4 | 31 | |
| 10 | Zalaegerszegi Dózsa | 30 | 12 | 3 | 15 | 46 | 53 | -7 | 27 | |
| 11 | NIKE Fűzfői AK | 30 | 10 | 7 | 13 | 30 | 41 | -11 | 27 | |
| 12 | Ajkai Bányász SK | 30 | 9 | 7 | 14 | 28 | 41 | -13 | 25 | |
| 13 | Almásfüzitői Timföldgyári SC | 30 | 9 | 7 | 14 | 32 | 50 | -18 | 25 | |
| 14 | Pécsi BTC | 30 | 9 | 6 | 15 | 44 | 52 | -8 | 24 | Relegation to Megyei Bajnokság I |
| 15 | Máza-Szászvári Bányász | 30 | 5 | 5 | 20 | 21 | 67 | -46 | 15 | Relegation to Megyei Bajnokság I |
| 16 | Kaposvári Rákóczi SC | 30 | 5 | 3 | 22 | 22 | 70 | -48 | 13 | Relegation to Megyei Bajnokság I |

=== Northern group ===
| Pos | Teams | Pld | W | D | L | GF | GA | GD | Pts | Promotion or relegation |
|---|---|---|---|---|---|---|---|---|---|---|
| 1 | Volán SC | 30 | 17 | 11 | 2 | 68 | 27 | 41 | 45 | Promotion to Nemzeti Bajnokság II |
| 2 | Nagybátonyi Bányász SC | 30 | 14 | 11 | 5 | 48 | 28 | 20 | 39 | |
| 3 | Vasas Izzó SK | 30 | 15 | 7 | 8 | 46 | 36 | 10 | 37 | |
| 4 | Kazincbarcikai Vegyész SE | 30 | 13 | 10 | 7 | 50 | 32 | 18 | 36 | |
| 5 | Vasas Ikarus SK | 30 | 16 | 3 | 11 | 52 | 37 | 15 | 35 | |
| 6 | Miskolci VSC | 30 | 13 | 6 | 11 | 46 | 28 | 18 | 32 | |
| 7 | Sátoraljaújhelyi Spartacus | 30 | 13 | 6 | 11 | 35 | 37 | -2 | 32 | |
| 8 | Esztergomi Vasas | 30 | 12 | 7 | 11 | 31 | 34 | -3 | 31 | |
| 9 | Nyíregyházi Spartacus Petőfi SC | 30 | 11 | 9 | 10 | 26 | 31 | -5 | 31 | |
| 10 | Kossuth KFSE | 30 | 10 | 10 | 10 | 27 | 34 | -7 | 30 | |
| 11 | Kisterenyei Bányász | 30 | 11 | 7 | 12 | 32 | 30 | 2 | 29 | |
| 12 | Leninvárosi MTK | 30 | 9 | 7 | 14 | 39 | 47 | -8 | 24 | |
| 13 | Salgótarjáni Kohász SE | 30 | 7 | 10 | 13 | 37 | 47 | -10 | 25 | |
| 14 | KELTEX SE | 30 | 8 | 7 | 15 | 30 | 54 | -24 | 23 | Relegation to Megyei Bajnokság I |
| 15 | BEAC | 30 | 7 | 4 | 19 | 28 | 53 | -25 | 18 | Relegation to Megyei Bajnokság I |
| 16 | Borsodi Bányász | 30 | 3 | 7 | 20 | 27 | 67 | -40 | 13 | Relegation to Megyei Bajnokság I |

=== Eastern group ===
| Pos | Teams | Pld | W | D | L | GF | GA | GD | Pts | Promotion or relegation |
|---|---|---|---|---|---|---|---|---|---|---|
| 1 | Pénzügyőr SE | 30 | 18 | 6 | 6 | 57 | 23 | 34 | 42 | Promotion to Nemzeti Bajnokság II |
| 2 | Ceglédi VSE | 30 | 16 | 9 | 5 | 54 | 30 | 24 | 41 | |
| 3 | Szegedi Dózsa | 30 | 14 | 8 | 8 | 49 | 33 | 16 | 36 | |
| 4 | Lehel SC | 30 | 13 | 10 | 7 | 30 | 20 | 10 | 36 | |
| 5 | KISTEXT SK | 30 | 10 | 12 | 8 | 38 | 30 | 8 | 32 | |
| 6 | Debreceni EAC | 30 | 12 | 7 | 11 | 52 | 46 | 6 | 31 | |
| 7 | Budafoki MTE Kinizsi | 30 | 10 | 10 | 10 | 45 | 37 | 8 | 30 | |
| 8 | MGM Debrecen | 30 | 10 | 10 | 10 | 33 | 42 | -9 | 30 | |
| 9 | Szolnoki MÁV SE | 30 | 9 | 11 | 10 | 45 | 41 | 4 | 29 | |
| 10 | Szegedi VSE | 30 | 10 | 8 | 12 | 48 | 45 | 3 | 28 | |
| 11 | Gyulai MEDOSZ SE | 30 | 10 | 7 | 13 | 42 | 49 | -7 | 27 | |
| 12 | Középületépítő SE | 30 | 9 | 9 | 12 | 30 | 43 | -13 | 27 | Relegation to Megyei Bajnokság I |
| 13 | Szarvasi Spartacus | 30 | 7 | 12 | 11 | 34 | 44 | -10 | 26 | |
| 14 | Vecsési Vizép | 30 | 7 | 10 | 13 | 31 | 46 | -15 | 24 | Relegation to Megyei Bajnokság I |
| 15 | Honvéd Bocskai SE | 30 | 9 | 6 | 15 | 50 | 65 | -15 | 24 | Relegation to Megyei Bajnokság I |
| 16 | Kiskunfélegyházi Vasas | 30 | 6 | 5 | 19 | 30 | 74 | -44 | 17 | Relegation to Megyei Bajnokság I |

== See also ==
- 1970–71 Magyar Kupa
- 1970–71 Nemzeti Bajnokság I
- 1970–71 Nemzeti Bajnokság II
