= 1970–71 Nemzeti Bajnokság II =

Nemzeti Bajnokság II
- Season: 1970–71
- Champions: Vörös Meteor Egyetértés SK
- Promoted: Vörös Meteor Egyetértés SK (winners); Egri Dózsa SC (runners-up)
- Relegated: BVSC; Székesfehérvári MÁV Előre SC; BKV Előre SC

The 1970–71 Nemzeti Bajnokság II was the 73rd season of the Nemzeti Bajnokság II, the second tier of the Hungarian football league.

== League table ==
Extra points were awarded to the teams according to their position in the 1970 season.

Pos	Team	Pld	W	D	L	GF	GA	GD	Pts	Promotion or relegation
1	Vörös Meteor Egyetértés SK	34	18	13	3	47	20	+27	57	Promotion to Nemzeti Bajnokság I
2	Egri Dózsa SC	34	19	8	7	52	23	+29	51	Promotion to Nemzeti Bajnokság I
3	Oroszlányi Bányász SK	34	18	6	10	58	39	+19	49	
4	Kecskeméti Dózsa	34	13	14	7	40	29	+11	47	
5	Győri MÁV Dunántúli AC	34	13	12	9	35	26	+9	44	
6	Békéscsabai Előre Spartacus SC	34	13	10	11	40	37	+3	42	
7	Zalaegerszegi TE	34	12	11	11	39	33	+6	40	
8	Pécsi Bányász	34	8	14	12	33	51	−18	39	
9	Debreceni VSC	34	13	10	11	44	37	+7	38	
10	FŐSPED Szállítók SE	34	9	10	15	30	42	−12	37	
11	Várpalotai Bányász SK	34	9	17	8	43	33	+10	36	
12	Budapesti Spartacus SC	34	8	12	14	32	41	−9	36	
13	Szolnoki MTE	34	10	11	13	38	42	−4	35	
14	Ganz-MÁVAG SE	34	7	16	11	37	51	−14	34	
15	Ózdi Kohász SE	34	10	9	15	34	48	−14	32	
16	BVSC	34	10	9	15	41	55	−14	30	Relegation to Nemzeti Bajnokság III
17	Székesfehérvári MÁV Előre SC	34	7	12	15	26	40	−14	28	Relegation to Nemzeti Bajnokság III
18	BKV Előre SC	34	6	12	16	20	42	−22	27	Relegation to Nemzeti Bajnokság III

== See also ==
- 1970 Magyar Kupa
- 1970–71 Nemzeti Bajnokság I
- 1970–71 Nemzeti Bajnokság III
