= 1972–73 Nemzeti Bajnokság III =

Nemzeti Bajnokság III
- Season: 1972–73
- Champions: Olajbányász SE (West); Kossuth KFSE (North); Budafoki MTE Kinizsi (East)
- Promoted: Olajbányász SE (West); Kossuth KFSE (North); Budafoki MTE Kinizsi (East)

The 1972–73 Nemzeti Bajnokság III season was the 1st edition of the Nemzeti Bajnokság III.

== League tables ==
=== Western group ===
Pos	Teams	Pld	W	D	L	GF	GA	GD	Pts	Promotion or relegation
1	Olajbányász SE	28	18	5	5	57	26	31	41	Promotion to Nemzeti Bajnokság II
2	Győri Dózsa SK	28	16	4	8	48	26	22	36	
3	Pécsi VSK	28	14	7	7	35	24	11	35	
4	Kaposvári Rákóczi SC	28	13	7	8	42	37	5	33	
5	NIKE Fűzfői AK	28	14	3	11	59	42	17	31	
6	Győri Elektromos	28	12	7	9	47	39	8	31	
7	Honvéd Táncsics SE	28	13	4	11	40	33	7	30	
8	Bakony Vegyész TC	28	11	7	10	31	34	-3	29	
9	Székesfehérvári MÁV Előre SC	28	12	2	14	32	33	-1	26	
10	Sabaria Cipőgyár SE 1	28	8	8	12	23	37	-14	24	
11	KOMÉP Tatabánya	28	10	4	14	24	38	-14	24	
12	Pécsi Bányász SC	28	9	5	14	33	38	-5	23	Relegation to Megyei Bajnokság I
13	Körmendi MTE	28	8	7	13	31	49	-18	23	
14	Pápai Textiles SE	28	8	6	14	26	37	-11	22	Relegation to Megyei Bajnokság I
15	Zalaegerszegi Dózsa SE	28	2	8	18	21	56	-35	12	Relegation to Megyei Bajnokság I
16	Pécsi Ércbányász SC 2	0	0	0	0	0	0	0	0	Relegation to Megyei Bajnokság I

Notes

1. 10 points deducted
2. points were deleted

=== Northern group ===
Pos	Teams	Pld	W	D	L	GF	GA	GD	Pts	Promotion or relegation
1	Kossuth KFSE	30	18	6	6	44	19	25	42	Promotion to Nemzeti Bajnokság II
2	Kazincbarcikai Vegyész SE	30	16	6	8	48	32	16	38	
3	Budapesti VSC	30	15	7	8	50	29	21	37	
4	Váci Híradás SE	30	14	8	8	42	28	14	36	
5	Leninvárosi MTK	30	13	8	9	40	28	12	34	
6	Sátoraljaújhelyi Spartacus	30	12	9	9	28	26	2	33	
7	Rudabányai Ércbányász	30	11	10	9	37	34	3	32	
8	Gyöngyösi Spartacus	30	10	11	9	34	31	3	31	
9	Vasas Izzó	30	11	9	10	41	39	2	31	
10	Nagybátonyi Bányász SC	30	10	10	10	39	42	-3	30	
11	Ózdi Kohász SE	30	9	12	9	36	42	-6	30	
12	Kisterenyei Bányász	30	10	8	12	37	41	-4	28	
13	Nyíregyházi Spartacus SC	30	9	9	12	35	40	-5	27	
14	Esztergomi Vasas	30	4	10	16	20	46	-26	18	Relegation to Megyei Bajnokság I
15	KELTEX SE	30	3	11	16	27	56	-29	17	Relegation to Megyei Bajnokság I
16	Törekvés SE	30	3	10	17	21	46	-25	16	Relegation to Megyei Bajnokság I

=== Eastern group ===
Pos	Teams	Pld	W	D	L	GF	GA	GD	Pts	Promotion or relegation
1	Budafoki MTE Kinizsi	30	19	5	6	68	36	32	43	Promotion to Nemzeti Bajnokság II
2	FŐSPED Szállítók SE	30	15	10	5	42	21	21	40	
3	Szegedi Dózsa	30	16	6	8	57	31	26	38	
4	Budapesti Építők SC	30	14	9	7	42	28	14	37	
5	Szegedi VSE	30	12	11	7	39	28	11	35	
6	III. kerületi TTVE	30	11	11	8	43	41	2	33	
7	MGM Debrecen	30	12	9	9	38	40	-2	33	
8	Ceglédi VSE	30	9	11	10	37	42	-5	29	
9	Debreceni EAC	30	9	10	11	40	41	-1	28	
10	Láng Vasas SK	30	8	11	11	32	39	-7	27	
11	Kiskunhalasi MEDOSZ	30	11	5	14	30	46	-16	27	
12	Hajdúböszörményi Bocskai	30	9	8	13	27	41	-14	26	
13	Békéscsabai VTSK	30	8	9	13	39	42	-3	25	
14	Szolnoki MÁV SE	30	8	8	14	33	44	-11	24	
15	KISTEXT SK	30	6	11	13	31	41	-10	23	Relegation to Megyei Bajnokság I
16	Gyulai MEDOSZ	30	2	8	20	23	60	-37	12	Relegation to Megyei Bajnokság I

== See also ==
- 1972–73 Magyar Kupa
- 1972–73 Nemzeti Bajnokság I
- 1972–73 Nemzeti Bajnokság II
