= 1968 Nemzeti Bajnokság III =

Nemzeti Bajnokság III
- Season: 1968
- Champions: Zalaegerszegi TE (West); Székesfehérvári MÁV Előre SC (Centre); Békéscsabai Előre SC (East)
- Promoted: Zalaegerszegi TE (West); Székesfehérvári MÁV Előre SC (Centre); Békéscsabai Előre SC (East)

The 1968 Nemzeti Bajnokság III season was the 1st edition of the Nemzeti Bajnokság III.

== League tables ==
=== Western group ===
Pos	Teams	Pld	W	D	L	GF	GA	GD	Pts	Promotion or relegation
1	Zalaegerszegi TE	30	18	8	4	67	26	41	44	Promotion to Nemzeti Bajnokság II
2	MÁV DAC	30	20	4	6	70	37	33	44	
3	Dorogi Bányász SC	30	17	5	8	76	29	47	39	
4	Pécsi Ércbányász SC	30	16	6	8	57	33	24	38	
5	Pápai Textiles SE	30	13	6	11	40	37	3	32	
6	Siófoki Bányász SK	30	11	9	10	44	50	-6	31	
7	Honvéd Táncsics SE	30	11	8	11	39	39	0	30	
8	Pécsi VSK	30	12	6	12	40	41	-1	30	
9	Veszprémi Vegyész SC	30	10	9	11	40	42	-2	29	
10	Nagykanizsai Olajbányász SE	30	12	4	14	42	53	-11	28	
11	Szombathelyi Cipőgyár SE	30	10	7	13	39	43	-4	27	
12	Kaposvári Kinizsi	30	10	7	13	35	44	-9	27	
13	Máza-Szászvári Bányász	30	9	9	12	37	49	-12	27	
14	Zalaegerszegi Dózsa SE	30	6	6	18	37	67	-30	27	Relegation to Megyei Bajnokság I
15	Nagykanizsai VTE	30	5	8	17	25	57	-32	18	Relegation to Megyei Bajnokság I
16	Mosoni Vasas SE	30	6	6	18	26	67	-41	18	Relegation to Megyei Bajnokság I

=== Central group ===
Pos	Teams	Pld	W	D	L	GF	GA	GD	Pts	Promotion or relegation
1	Székesfehérvári MÁV Előre SC	30	18	6	6	69	32	37	42	Promotion to Nemzeti Bajnokság II
2	Salgótarjáni Kohász SE	30	16	7	7	53	36	17	39	
3	Borsodi Bányász	30	14	10	6	40	20	20	38	
4	Kazincbarcikai MTK	30	14	7	9	47	32	15	35	
5	Esztergomi Vasas SC	30	12	8	10	48	37	11	32	
6	Almásfüzitői Timföld SC	30	12	8	10	40	32	8	32	
7	Honvéd Papp József SE	30	11	8	11	52	46	6	30	
8	Kossuth KFSE	30	11	8	11	50	45	5	30	
9	Volán SC	30	10	9	11	33	31	2	29	
10	Erzsébeti Vasas TK	30	13	3	14	44	46	-2	29	
11	Ormósbányai Bányász	30	13	3	14	37	51	-14	29	
12	Budapesti EAC	30	10	8	12	53	55	-2	28	
13	Kisterenyei Bányász SE	30	10	8	12	33	46	-13	28	
14	III. kerületi TTVE	30	9	6	15	33	50	-17	24	Relegation to Megyei Bajnokság I
15	Tűzoltó Dózsa	30	8	7	15	32	50	-18	23	Relegation to Megyei Bajnokság I
16	Fővárosi Autóbusz	30	5	2	23	27	82	-55	12	Relegation to Megyei Bajnokság I

=== Eastern group ===
Pos	Teams	Pld	W	D	L	GF	GA	GD	Pts	Promotion or relegation
1	Békéscsabai Előre SC	30	18	6	6	53	19	34	42	Promotion to Nemzeti Bajnokság II
2	Szolnoki MÁV SE	30	18	3	9	51	31	20	39	
3	Ceglédi VSE	30	13	11	6	54	42	12	37	
4	Debreceni VSC	30	15	6	9	50	40	10	36	
5	KISTEXT SK	30	13	9	8	61	44	17	35	
6	Pénzügyőr SE	30	14	5	11	51	38	13	33	
7	Szegedi Dózsa SE	30	11	8	11	36	39	-3	30	
8	MGM Debrecen	30	10	9	11	32	32	0	29	
9	Kiskunfélegyházi Vasas TK	30	9	9	12	40	41	-1	27	
10	Jászberényi Lehel SC	30	9	9	12	49	60	-11	27	
11	Kecskeméti TE	30	9	9	12	39	51	-12	27	
12	Szegedi VSE	30	8	11	11	27	39	-12	27	
13	Gyulai MEDOSZ	30	9	8	13	32	45	-13	26	
14	Gázművek MTE	30	7	11	12	49	65	-16	25	Relegation to Megyei Bajnokság I
15	Kelenföldi Goldberger SE	30	6	10	14	35	57	-22	22	Relegation to Megyei Bajnokság I
16	Debreceni Elektromos Vasas	30	5	8	17	39	55	-16	18	Relegation to Megyei Bajnokság I

== See also ==
- 1968 Magyar Kupa
- 1968 Nemzeti Bajnokság I
- 1968 Nemzeti Bajnokság II
