= 1970 Nemzeti Bajnokság III =

Nemzeti Bajnokság III
- Season: 1970
- Champions: Pécsi Ércbányász SC (West); Volán SC (North); Szolnoki MÁV SE (East)

The 1970 Nemzeti Bajnokság III season was the 1st edition of the Nemzeti Bajnokság III.

== League tables ==
=== Western group ===
Pos	Teams	Pld	W	D	L	GF	GA	GD	Pts	Promotion or relegation
1	Pécsi Ércbányász SC	15	11	3	1	44	8	36	25	No promotion or relegation
2	Szekszárdi Dózsa SE	15	10	2	3	23	9	14	22	No promotion or relegation
3	Bakony Vegyész TC	15	9	2	4	18	8	10	20	No promotion or relegation
4	Győri Dózsa SK	15	6	5	4	16	12	4	17	No promotion or relegation
5	Honvéd Táncsics SE	15	7	2	6	30	23	7	16	No promotion or relegation
6	Kaposvári Rákóczi SC	15	5	5	5	21	20	1	15	No promotion or relegation
7	Máza-Szászvári Bányász	15	5	5	5	17	18	-1	15	No promotion or relegation
8	Dorogi Bányász SC	15	4	6	5	17	18	-1	14	No promotion or relegation
9	Pápai Textiles SE	15	5	4	6	19	22	-3	14	No promotion or relegation
10	NIKE Fűzfői AK	15	5	4	6	14	17	-3	14	No promotion or relegation
11	Bauxitbányász SE	15	5	4	6	20	27	-7	14	No promotion or relegation
12	Almásfüzitői Timföldgyári SC	15	5	4	6	17	23	-6	14	No promotion or relegation
13	Zalaegerszegi Dózsa	15	4	4	7	14	24	-10	12	No promotion or relegation
14	Ajkai Bányász SK	15	3	5	7	15	33	-18	11	No promotion or relegation
15	Savaria Cipőgyár SE	15	3	4	8	16	24	-8	10	No promotion or relegation
16	Pécsi BTC	15	2	3	10	11	26	-15	7	No promotion or relegation

=== Northern group ===
Pos	Teams	Pld	W	D	L	GF	GA	GD	Pts	Promotion or relegation
1	Volán SC	15	14	1	0	42	8	34	29	No promotion or relegation
2	Kazincbarcikai Vegyész SE	15	10	1	4	34	13	21	21	No promotion or relegation
3	Salgótarjáni Kohász SE	15	9	3	3	25	19	6	21	No promotion or relegation
4	Leninvárosi MTK	15	9	0	6	29	23	6	18	No promotion or relegation
5	Sátoraljaújhelyi Spartacus	15	6	5	4	20	14	6	17	No promotion or relegation
6	Miskolci VSC	15	7	2	6	26	18	8	16	No promotion or relegation
7	Kisterenyei Bányász	15	5	6	4	17	20	-3	16	No promotion or relegation
8	Vasas Izzó SK	15	4	7	4	19	23	-4	15	No promotion or relegation
9	Vasas Ikarus SK	15	5	4	6	19	23	-4	14	No promotion or relegation
10	Nyíregyházi Spartacus	15	3	8	4	16	21	-5	14	No promotion or relegation
11	Nagybátonyi Bányász SC	15	5	3	7	20	25	-5	13	No promotion or relegation
12	Kossuth KFSE	15	4	4	7	18	22	-4	12	No promotion or relegation
13	Esztergomi Vasas	15	5	2	8	20	26	-6	12	No promotion or relegation
14	Borsodi Bányász	15	2	5	8	11	22	-11	9	No promotion or relegation
15	Budapesti EAC	15	2	3	10	10	35	-25	7	No promotion or relegation
16	KELTEX SE	15	2	2	11	13	27	-14	6	No promotion or relegation

=== Eastern group ===
Pos	Teams	Pld	W	D	L	GF	GA	GD	Pts	Promotion or relegation
1	Szolnoki MÁV SE	15	10	4	1	27	9	18	24	No promotion or relegation
2	Pénzügyőr SE	15	8	4	3	26	11	15	20	No promotion or relegation
3	Ceglédi VSE	15	7	3	5	26	16	10	17	No promotion or relegation
4	Szegedi Dózsa	15	7	3	5	16	10	6	17	No promotion or relegation
5	Középítők SE	15	7	3	5	25	20	5	17	No promotion or relegation
6	Szegedi VSE	15	7	3	5	18	18	0	17	No promotion or relegation
7	Szarvasi Spartacus	15	6	4	5	18	18	0	16	No promotion or relegation
8	KISTEXT SK	15	6	3	6	30	25	5	15	No promotion or relegation
9	Debreceni EAC	15	4	6	5	21	22	-1	14	No promotion or relegation
10	Budafoki MTE	15	4	6	5	16	17	-1	14	No promotion or relegation
11	Jászberényi Lehel SC	15	6	2	7	18	21	-3	14	No promotion or relegation
12	Kiskunfélegyházi Vasas	15	4	5	6	14	26	-12	13	No promotion or relegation
13	Honvéd Bocskai SE	15	5	2	8	19	24	-5	12	No promotion or relegation
14	Vecsési Vizép SK	15	4	3	8	17	27	-10	11	No promotion or relegation
15	MGM Debrecen	15	2	7	6	15	27	-12	11	No promotion or relegation
16	Gyulai MEDOSZ	15	3	2	10	11	26	-15	8	No promotion or relegation

== See also ==
- 1970 Magyar Kupa
- 1970 Nemzeti Bajnokság I
- 1970 Nemzeti Bajnokság II
