= 1990–91 Nemzeti Bajnokság II =

Nemzeti Bajnokság II
- Season: 1990–91
- Champions: Szombathelyi Haladás (West); Budapesti VSC (East)
- Promoted: Szombathelyi Haladás (West); Zalaegerszegi TE (West); Budapesti VSC (East); Diósgyőri VTK
- Relegated: Komlói Bányász SK (West); FC Ajka (West); Debreceni MTE (East); Kecskeméti TE (East); Metripond

The 1990–91 Nemzeti Bajnokság II was the 93rd season of the Nemzeti Bajnokság II, the second tier of the Hungarian football league.

== League table ==
=== Western group ===
Pos	Team	Pld	W	D	L	GF	GA	GD	Pts	Promotion or relegation
1	Haladás VSE	30	18	7	5	58	26	+32	43	Promotion to Nemzeti Bajnokság I
2	Zalaegerszegi TE	30	17	8	5	53	26	+27	42	Promotion to Nemzeti Bajnokság I
3	Dunaferr SE	30	16	9	5	48	27	+21	41	
4	III. Kerületi TTVE	30	14	12	4	23	13	+10	40	
5	Nagykanizsai Olajbányász SE	30	11	10	9	42	35	+7	32	
6	Oroszlányi Bányász SE	30	10	10	10	21	27	−6	30	
7	Dorogi Bányász SC	30	11	6	13	38	32	+6	28	
8	Paksi Atomerőmű SE	30	10	8	12	35	34	+1	28	
9	Mohácsi Új Barázda TSZ SE	30	8	11	11	20	26	−6	27	
10	Sabaria-Tipo SE	30	8	10	12	29	33	−4	26	
11	BKV Előre SC	30	9	8	13	30	39	−9	26	
12	Soproni LC	30	8	10	12	33	43	−10	26	
13	Szekszárdi Dózsa SE	30	7	11	12	33	42	−9	25	
14	Komlói Bányász SK	30	9	5	16	30	45	−15	23	Relegation to Nemzeti Bajnokság III
15	Budafoki MTE-Törley	30	8	6	16	32	59	−27	22	
16	Ajka Hungalu SK	30	6	9	15	20	38	−18	21	Relegation to Nemzeti Bajnokság III

=== Eastern group ===
Pos	Team	Pld	W	D	L	GF	GA	GD	Pts	Promotion or relegation
1	BVSC-Mávtransped	30	18	9	3	45	24	+21	45	Promotion to Nemzeti Bajnokság I
2	Diósgyőri VTK	30	17	10	3	56	27	+29	44	Promotion to Nemzeti Bajnokság I
3	Csepel SC	30	18	5	7	43	29	+14	41	
4	Nyíregyházi VSSC	30	14	9	7	42	21	+21	37	
5	Kazincbarcikai Vegyész	30	16	3	11	59	42	+17	35	
6	Kabai Egyetértés	30	12	9	9	41	26	+15	33	
7	Bajai SK	30	12	9	9	29	24	+5	33	
8	Eger SE	30	11	7	12	38	36	+2	29	
9	Salgótarján	30	8	10	12	39	38	+1	26	
10	Kecskeméti SC	30	6	13	11	32	43	−11	25	
11	Debreceni MTE	30	7	11	12	24	37	−13	25	Relegation to Nemzeti Bajnokság III
12	Szarvasi VSSC	30	8	8	14	34	48	−14	24	
13	Hatvani DEKO SE	30	9	5	16	33	40	−7	23	
14	Szolnoki MÁV MTE	30	8	7	15	29	49	−20	23	
15	Kecskeméti TE	30	8	6	16	27	57	−30	22	Relegation to Nemzeti Bajnokság III
16	Hódmezővásárhelyi Metripond SE	30	5	5	20	22	52	−30	15	Relegation to Nemzeti Bajnokság III

== See also ==
- 1990–91 Magyar Kupa
- 1990–91 Nemzeti Bajnokság I
