= 1954 Nemzeti Bajnokság II =

Nemzeti Bajnokság II
- Season: 1954
- Champions: Kőbányai Dózsa (West); Budapesti Vörös Meteor (Central); Ózdi Vasas (East); Légierő SE (South)
- Promoted: Légierő SE (South)
- Relegated: Several

The 1954 Nemzeti Bajnokság II was the 55th season of the Nemzeti Bajnokság II, the second tier of the Hungarian football league.

== League table ==
=== Western group ===
Pos	Team	Pld	W	D	L	GF	GA	GD	Pts	Promotion or relegation
1	Kőbányai Dózsa (Note: On 25 January 1955, merger with Pécsi Dózsába.)	30	18	10	2	72	24	+48	46	
2	Pécsi Lokomotív (Note: New name: Pécsi Törekvés SK.)	30	19	8	3	83	32	+51	46	
3	Pécsi Bányász (Note: Competed with the rights of Pécsújhegyi Bányász.)	30	15	6	9	72	43	+29	36	
4	Nagykanizsai Bányász	30	14	6	10	47	31	+16	34	
5	Komlói Bányász SK	30	13	7	10	64	54	+10	33	
6	Várpalotai Bányász SK	30	13	7	10	36	38	−2	33	
7	Győri Lokomotív (Note: New name: Győri Törekvés SK.)	30	13	5	12	57	57	0	31	
8	Soproni Lokomotív (Note: New name: Soproni Törekvés SK.)	30	12	6	12	51	48	+3	30	
9	Székesfehérvári Honvéd	30	11	7	12	42	50	−8	29	Relegation to Nemzeti Bajnokság III
10	Szombathelyi Vörös Lobogó	30	9	11	10	46	54	−8	29	Relegation to Nemzeti Bajnokság III
11	Pécsi Dózsa (Note: On 25 January 1955 merged with Kőbányai Dózsa as Pécsi Dózsa and promoted to the 1955 Nemzeti Bajnokság I.)	30	8	10	12	41	48	−7	26	Promotion to Nemzeti Bajnokság I
12	Csillaghegyi Vörös Lobogó	30	12	2	16	48	65	−17	26	Relegation to Nemzeti Bajnokság III
13	Székesfehérvári Építők	30	9	7	14	48	59	−11	25	Relegation to Nemzeti Bajnokság III
14	Pápai Vörös Lobogó	30	9	5	16	44	57	−13	23	Relegation to Nemzeti Bajnokság III
15	Tatabányai Építők	30	7	6	17	43	75	−32	20	Relegation to Nemzeti Bajnokság III
16	Pécsi Vörös Lobogó	30	4	3	23	26	85	−59	11	Relegation to Nemzeti Bajnokság III

=== Central group ===
Pos	Team	Pld	W	D	L	GF	GA	GD	Pts	Relegation
1	Budapesti Vörös Meteor	30	23	4	3	102	29	+73	50	
2	Tatabányai Bányász	30	21	6	3	90	27	+63	48	
3	Budapesti Gyárépítők	30	17	5	8	65	37	+28	39	
4	Pénzügyőrök	30	15	8	7	55	38	+17	38	
5	Kinizsi Dohánygyár	30	16	5	9	46	39	+7	37	
6	Budapesti Spartacus	30	16	4	10	51	34	+17	36	
7	Váci Vörös Lobogó	30	14	8	8	47	35	+12	36	
8	Vasas Ganzvagon	30	11	9	10	47	39	+8	31	Relegation to Nemzeti Bajnokság III
9	Vörös Lobogó Duna-cipőgyár	30	12	5	13	57	56	+1	29	Relegation to Nemzeti Bajnokság III
10	Budapesti Haladás	30	11	5	14	47	56	−9	27	Relegation to Nemzeti Bajnokság III
11	Vasas-MÁVAG	30	6	11	13	46	72	−26	23	Relegation to Nemzeti Bajnokság III
12	Pesterzsébeti Vasas	30	7	8	15	39	60	−21	22	Relegation to Nemzeti Bajnokság III
13	Szikra Kénsavgyár	30	8	5	17	32	69	−37	21	Relegation to Nemzeti Bajnokság III
14	Kinizsi Sörgyár	30	7	5	18	36	58	−22	19	Relegation to Nemzeti Bajnokság III
15	Szikra Gázművek	30	5	3	22	35	85	−50	13	Relegation to Nemzeti Bajnokság III
16	Esztergomi Vasas	30	3	5	22	29	90	−61	11	Relegation to Nemzeti Bajnokság III

=== Eastern group ===
Pos	Team	Pld	W	D	L	GF	GA	GD	Pts	Relegation
1	Ózdi Vasas	30	25	1	4	103	23	+80	51	
2	Nyíregyházi Építők	30	17	4	9	49	39	+10	38	
3	Gödöllői Dózsa	30	16	6	8	60	54	+6	38	
4	Miskolci Lokomotív	30	15	6	9	58	42	+16	36	
5	Debreceni Lokomotív	30	15	5	10	76	50	+26	35	
6	Salgótarjáni Vasas	30	15	5	10	65	49	+16	35	
7	Perecesi Bányász	30	16	2	12	60	49	+11	34	
8	Nagybátonyi Bányász SC	30	15	4	11	55	47	+8	34	Relegation to Nemzeti Bajnokság III
9	Debreceni Honvéd	30	11	10	9	42	45	−3	32	Relegation to Nemzeti Bajnokság III
10	Egri Fáklya	30	10	9	11	31	33	−2	29	Relegation to Nemzeti Bajnokság III
11	Sajószentpéteri Bányász	30	12	2	16	46	58	−12	26	Relegation to Nemzeti Bajnokság III
12	Miskolci Honvéd SE	30	10	5	15	44	60	−16	25	Relegation to Nemzeti Bajnokság III
13	Kisterenyei Bányász	30	9	4	17	37	71	−34	22	Relegation to Nemzeti Bajnokság III
14	Miskolci Építők	30	7	6	17	38	60	−22	20	Relegation to Nemzeti Bajnokság III
15	Budapesti Lokomotív	30	3	9	18	33	74	−41	15	
16	Budapesti Postás SE	30	3	4	23	32	75	−43	10	Relegation to Nemzeti Bajnokság III

=== Southern group ===
Pos	Team	Pld	W	D	L	GF	GA	GD	Pts	Promotion or relegation
1	Légierő SE	30	20	5	5	77	28	+49	45	Promotion to Nemzeti Bajnokság I
2	Békéscsabai Építők	30	14	9	7	49	35	+14	37	
3	Budapesti Szikra	30	16	5	9	56	43	+13	37	
4	Vasas Dinamó	30	16	4	10	68	39	+29	36	
5	Budapesti Előre	30	15	6	9	57	39	+18	36	
6	Kecskeméti Honvéd	30	14	5	11	63	51	+12	33	
7	Ceglédi Lokomotív	30	14	4	12	57	48	+9	32	
8	Szolnoki Lokomotív	30	13	6	11	51	46	+5	32	Relegation to Nemzeti Bajnokság III
9	Orosházi Kinizsi	30	14	4	12	40	46	−6	32	Relegation to Nemzeti Bajnokság III
10	Kőbányai Lokomotív	30	12	4	14	42	46	−4	28	Relegation to Nemzeti Bajnokság III
11	Kecskeméti Kinizsi	30	13	2	15	52	58	−6	28	Relegation to Nemzeti Bajnokság III
12	Gyulai Építők	30	10	7	13	42	55	−13	27	Relegation to Nemzeti Bajnokság III
13	Szegedi Lokomotív	30	8	6	16	38	57	−19	22	Relegation to Nemzeti Bajnokság III
14	Vörös Lobogó SorTex	30	8	3	19	46	65	−19	19	Relegation to Nemzeti Bajnokság III
15	Vasas Generátor	30	8	3	19	39	90	−51	19	Relegation to Nemzeti Bajnokság III
16	Szegedi Petőfi	30	6	5	19	47	78	−31	17	Relegation to Nemzeti Bajnokság III

== Promotion play-off ==
Pos	Team	Pld	W	D	L	GF	GA	GD	Pts
1	Kőbányai Dózsa	3	2	1	0	4	1	+3	5
2	Légierő SE (Szolnok)	3	1	2	0	3	0	+3	4
3	Budapesti Vörös Meteor	3	1	1	1	1	1	0	3
4	Ózdi Vasas	3	0	0	3	1	7	−6	0

== See also ==
- 1954 Nemzeti Bajnokság I
