= 1960–61 OB I bajnoksag season =

Hungarian ice hockey season

The 1960–61 OB I bajnokság season was the 24th season of the OB I bajnokság, the top level of ice hockey in Hungary. Six teams participated in the league, and Ferencvarosi TC won the championship.

== Regular season ==
	Club	GP	W	T	L	Goals	Pts
1.	Ferencvárosi TC	15	11	2	2	110:54	24
2.	Vörös Meteor Budapest	15	11	1	3	75:44	23
3.	Újpesti Dózsa SC	15	10	2	3	122:47	22
4.	BVSC Budapest	15	6	0	9	104:74	12
5.	Építõk Budapest	15	3	2	10	43:82	8
6.	Postás Budapest	15	0	1	14	40:193	1
