= 1971–72 Nemzeti Bajnokság II =

Nemzeti Bajnokság II
- Season: 1971–72
- Champions: Szegedi EOL
- Promoted: Szegedi EOL (winners); Zalaegerszegi TE (runners-up)
- Relegated: Pécsi Bányász SC; Ózdi Kohász SE; FŐSPED Szállítók SE

The 1971–72 Nemzeti Bajnokság II was the 74th season of the Nemzeti Bajnokság II, the second tier of the Hungarian football league.

== League table ==
Pos	Team	Pld	W	D	L	GF	GA	GD	Pts	Promotion or relegation
1	Szegedi EOL	34	21	8	5	75	38	+37	50	Promotion to Nemzeti Bajnokság I
2	Zalaegerszegi TE	34	21	7	6	62	26	+36	49	Promotion to Nemzeti Bajnokság I
3	Debreceni Vasutas SC	34	17	9	8	42	32	+10	43	
4	MÁV DAC	34	15	12	7	59	39	+20	42	
5	Budapesti Spartacus SC	34	13	13	8	46	38	+8	39	
6	Dunaújvárosi Kohász SE	34	13	12	9	38	33	+5	38	
7	Békéscsabai ESSC	34	12	13	9	45	40	+5	37	
8	Kecskeméti Dózsa SC	34	11	11	12	54	52	+2	33	
9	Volán SC	34	11	11	12	48	54	−6	33	
10	Szolnoki MTE	34	10	12	12	47	50	−3	32	
11	Várpalotai Bányász SK	34	10	12	12	35	43	−8	32	
12	Dorogi AC	34	9	13	12	34	36	−2	31	
13	Pénzügyőr SE	34	8	14	12	36	46	−10	30	
14	Ganz-MÁVAG SE	34	10	9	15	37	41	−4	29	
15	Oroszlányi Bányász SK	34	9	11	14	50	58	−8	29	
16	Pécsi Bányász SC	34	8	7	19	40	63	−23	23	Relegation to Nemzeti Bajnokság III
17	Ózdi Kohász SE	34	8	7	19	31	61	−30	23	Relegation to Nemzeti Bajnokság III
18	FŐSPED Szállítók SE	34	6	7	21	33	62	−29	19	Relegation to Nemzeti Bajnokság III

== See also ==
- 1971–72 Magyar Kupa
- 1971–72 Nemzeti Bajnokság I
- 1971–72 Nemzeti Bajnokság III
