= 1953–54 OB I bajnoksag season =

Hungarian ice hockey season

The 1953–54 OB I bajnokság season was the 17th season of the OB I bajnokság, the top level of ice hockey in Hungary. Seven teams participated in the league, and Postas Budapest won the championship.

== Regular season ==
	Club	GP	W	T	L	Goals	Pts
1.	Postás Budapest	12	11	1	0	115:24	23
2.	Vörös Meteor Budapest	12	10	1	1	96:14	21
3.	Kinizsi SE Budapest	12	8	0	4	90:36	16
4.	Építõk Budapest	12	6	0	6	68:53	12
5.	Szikra Budapest	12	4	0	8	48:86	8
6.	Postás Keleti	12	1	1	10	23:85	3
7.	Gyõri Vasas	12	0	1	11	15:157	1
