= 1959–60 OB I bajnoksag season =

Hungarian ice hockey season

The 1959–60 OB I bajnokság season was the 23rd season of the OB I bajnokság, the top level of ice hockey in Hungary. Five teams participated in the league, and Ujpesti Dozsa SC won the championship.

== Regular season ==
	Club	GP	W	T	L	Goals	Pts
1.	Újpesti Dózsa SC	12	9	2	1	76:34	20
2.	Vörös Meteor Budapest	12	6	2	4	48:38	14
3.	BVSC Budapest	12	4	3	5	43:45	11
4.	Ferencvárosi TC	12	4	3	5	51:54	11
5.	Építõk Budapest	12	1	2	9	23:70	4
