= 1977–78 Nemzeti Bajnokság III =

Nemzeti Bajnokság III
- Season: 1977–78
- Champions: Pécsi VSK (West); GANZ MÁVAG SE (Center); Ózdi Kohász SE (East)

The 1977–78 Nemzeti Bajnokság III season was the 1st edition of the Nemzeti Bajnokság III.

== League tables ==
=== Western group ===
Pos	Teams	Pld	W	D	L	GF	GA	GD	Pts	Promotion or relegation
1	Pécsi VSK	38	22	7	9	66	28	38	51	Promotion to play-offs
2	Ajkai Alumínium	38	20	9	9	68	36	32	49	Promotion to play-offs
3	Bauxitbányász SE	38	18	13	7	68	39	29	49	Promotion to play-offs
4	Oroszlányi Bányász SC	38	19	8	11	65	53	12	46	Promotion to play-offs
5	MÁV Nagykanizsai TE	38	14	16	8	47	43	4	44	Promotion to play-offs
6	Honvéd Rákóczi SE	38	16	10	12	47	28	19	42	Promotion to play-offs
7	Bábolnai SE	38	15	12	11	58	41	17	42	Promotion to play-offs
8	Péti MTE	38	15	12	11	49	38	11	42	Promotion to play-offs
9	KOMÉP SC	38	13	16	9	53	43	10	42	Promotion to play-offs
10	Répcelaki Bányász	38	18	6	14	55	54	1	42	Promotion to play-offs
11	Véméndi TSZ SK	38	14	12	12	58	49	9	40	Relegation to Megyei Bajnokság I
12	Bakony Vegyész TC	38	14	12	12	48	44	4	40	Promotion to play-offs
13	Soproni Textiles	38	16	7	15	58	64	-6	39	Promotion to play-offs
14	Sabaria SE	38	15	8	15	45	46	-1	38	Promotion to play-offs
15	Sellyei SK	38	12	11	15	39	50	-11	35	Relegation to Megyei Bajnokság I
16	Siófoki Bányász FC	38	9	10	19	39	46	-7	28	Relegation to Megyei Bajnokság I
17	Keszthelyi Haladás SC	38	9	9	20	51	84	-33	27	Relegation to Megyei Bajnokság I
18	Honvéd Kiss János SE	38	8	6	24	34	74	-40	22	Relegation to Megyei Bajnokság I
19	Soproni KSE	38	5	11	22	41	82	-41	21	Relegation to Megyei Bajnokság I
20	Latex Kőszegi SE	38	6	9	23	35	82	-47	21	Relegation to Megyei Bajnokság I

=== Central group ===
Pos	Teams	Pld	W	D	L	GF	GA	GD	Pts	Promotion or relegation
1	Ganz-MÁVAG	38	21	8	9	89	49	40	50	Promotion to play-offs
2	Építők SC	38	19	12	7	75	41	34	50	Promotion to play-offs
3	Kecskeméti SC	38	20	9	9	79	41	38	49	Promotion to play-offs
4	Balassagyarmati SE	38	18	12	8	59	35	24	48	Promotion to play-offs
5	Pénzügyőr SE	38	17	13	8	61	39	22	47	Promotion to play-offs
6	22. sz. Volán SE	38	19	9	10	58	42	16	47	Promotion to play-offs
7	Bp. Spartacus	38	17	10	11	55	46	9	44	Promotion to play-offs
8	Gyöngyösi Spartacus	38	18	7	13	63	53	10	43	Promotion to play-offs
9	Perbáli TSZ SK	38	15	12	11	51	39	12	42	Relegation to Megyei Bajnokság I
10	Honvéd Bem József SE	38	15	12	11	47	39	8	42	Promotion to play-offs
11	Dunakeszi VSE	38	16	9	13	52	51	1	41	Promotion to play-offs
12	ESMTK	38	16	5	17	67	66	1	37	Relegation to Megyei Bajnokság I
13	Kecskeméti TE 1	38	18	8	12	58	49	9	34	Relegation to Megyei Bajnokság I
14	Dunaújvárosi Építők	38	14	6	18	61	65	-4	34	Promotion to play-offs
15	Vasas Ikarus SK	38	10	10	18	41	56	-15	30	Promotion to play-offs
16	ÉGSZÖV MEDOSZ	38	9	10	19	43	59	-16	28	Relegation to Megyei Bajnokság I
17	Ceglédi VSE	38	9	8	21	35	77	-42	26	Relegation to Megyei Bajnokság I
18	AURAS SE	38	6	10	22	30	78	-48	22	Relegation to Megyei Bajnokság I
19	Láng Vasas SK	38	7	5	26	31	75	-44	19	Relegation to Megyei Bajnokság I
20	Enyingi Medosz	38	5	7	26	38	93	-55	17	Relegation to Megyei Bajnokság I

Notes:

1. 10 points deducted due to attempt of bribery

=== Eastern group ===
Pos	Teams	Pld	W	D	L	GF	GA	GD	Pts	Promotion or relegation
1	Ózdi Kohász SE	38	20	13	5	73	31	42	53	Promotion to play-offs
2	Miskolci VSC	38	23	6	9	87	44	43	52	Promotion to play-offs
3	Szarvasi Főiskola Spartacus	38	23	6	9	84	45	39	52	Promotion to play-offs
4	Honvéd Papp József SE	38	16	14	8	71	42	29	46	Promotion to play-offs
5	Szegedi Dózsa	38	16	14	8	67	49	18	46	Promotion to play-offs
6	Honvéd Szabó Lajos SE	38	18	8	12	61	44	17	44	Promotion to play-offs
7	Nyíregyházi Vasutas Spartacus	38	14	15	9	48	33	15	43	Promotion to play-offs
8	HÓDGÉP Metripond SE	38	15	13	10	66	52	14	43	Promotion to play-offs
9	Debreceni MTE	38	17	8	13	64	46	18	42	Promotion to play-offs
10	Gyulai SE	38	16	9	13	56	57	-1	41	Promotion to play-offs
11	Borsodi Bányász	38	17	6	15	60	71	-11	40	Promotion to play-offs
12	Lehel SC	38	14	11	13	53	61	-8	39	Promotion to play-offs
13	Leninvárosi MTK	38	15	8	15	61	51	10	38	Promotion to play-offs
14	Szolnoki MÁV	38	9	15	14	63	78	-15	33	Promotion to play-offs
15	Kisvárdai SE	38	10	13	15	47	62	-15	33	Promotion to play-offs
16	Recski Ércbányász	38	10	10	18	45	68	-23	30	Relegation to Megyei Bajnokság I
17	Sátoraljaújhelyi Spartacus Medosz MÁV	38	7	10	21	42	84	-42	24	Relegation to Megyei Bajnokság I
18	Hajdúszoboszlói Bocskai	38	5	13	20	36	65	-29	23	Relegation to Megyei Bajnokság I
19	Szegedi VSE	38	5	12	21	36	75	-39	22	Relegation to Megyei Bajnokság I
20	Salgótarjáni Síküveggyár	38	4	6	26	32	94	-62	16	Relegation to Megyei Bajnokság I

== Promotion play-offs ==
=== Western group ===
==== Round 1 ====
Véméndi TSZ SK - Honvéd Kiss J. SE (Kapoly) 2:1 (1:1), 0:1 (0:0)

Sabaria SE - Siófoki Bányász SE 0:0, 0:0 (11-esek)

Keszthelyi Haladás - Honvéd Táncsics SE (Kaposvár) 3:1 (1:0), 0:1 (0:1)

Soproni Textiles SE bye

Bakony Vegyész TC bye

==== Round 2 ====
Sabaria SE - Véméndi TSZ SK 0:1 (0:0), 3:0 (1:0)

MÁV Dunántúli AC - Keszthelyi Haladás 2:0 (2:0), 2:0 (1:0)

Bakony Vegyész - Kecskeméti TE 1:0 (1:0), 2:0 (0:0)

Soproni Textiles SE - Körmendi Dózsa FMTE 4:0 (2:0), 2:2 (0:1)

=== Central group ===
==== Round 1 ====
ÉGSZÖV MEDOSZ	0:1 (0:0)	2:1 (1:0)	Április 4. Vasas
Kecskeméti TE	1:0 (0:0)	1:1 (0:0)	Mohácsi MTE
Vasas Ikarus	1:2 (0:1)	3:2 (2:1)	Honvéd Szondi SE (Székesfehérvár)
Dunaújvárosi Építők SK	3:1 (2:0)	0:1 (0:1)	Paksi SE
Dunakeszi VSE	1:1 (1:0)	4:2 (2:2)	Erzsébeti Spartacus MTK
Ceglédi VSE	bye		

==== Round 2 ====
Dunakeszi VSE	1:0 (1:0)	0:0	ÉGSZÖV MEDOSZ
Dunaújvárosi Építők	3:0 (2:0)	2:2 (1:1)	Ceglédi VSE
Vasas Ikarus	4:0 (2:0)	0:3 (0:2)	Várpalotai Bányász SK
Bakony Vegyész	1:0 (1:0)	2:0 (0:0)	Kecskeméti TE

=== Eastern group ===
==== Round 1 ====
Szolnoki MÁV SE - Honvéd Kun Béla SE (Kiskunfélegyháza) 0:0, 2:1 (2:0)

Kisvárdai SE - Debreceni Kinizsi 3:0 (2:0), 0:0

Edelényi Bányász - Nyírbátori Báthory SC 5:0 (1:0), 0:1 (0:0)

Lehel SC - Hajdúszoboszlói Bocskai 0:0, 2:1 (0:1)

Borsodi Bányász - Bélapátfalvi Építők 2:2 (1:1), 3:0 )1:0)

Nagybátonyi Bányász - Recski Ércbányász 3:2 (0:0), 1:2 (0:1)

Leninvárosi MTK erőnyerő

Sátoraljaújhelyi Spartacus MEDOSZ MÁV erőnyerő

==== Round 2 ====
Leninvárosi MTK - Nagybátonyi Bányász 2:1 (1:0), 1:1 (1:0)

Edelényi Bányász - Borsodi Bányász 1:1 (0:0), 3:1 (1:0)

Szolnoki MÁV SE - Szentesi Vízmű 0:1 (0:1), 2:0 (0:0)

Lehel SC - Jászberényi Vasas 2:0 (1:0), 3:0 (0:0)

Kisvárdai SE - Sátoraljaújhelyi Spartacus MEDOSZ MÁV 2:1 (2:0), 2:0 (1:0)

== See also ==
- 1981–82 Magyar Kupa
- 1981–82 Nemzeti Bajnokság I
- 1981–82 Nemzeti Bajnokság II
