= 1956–57 OB I bajnoksag season =

Hungarian ice hockey season

The 1956–57 OB I bajnokság season was the 20th season of the OB I bajnokság, the top level of ice hockey in Hungary. Five teams participated in the league, and Voros Meteor Budapest won the championship.

== Regular season ==
	Club	GP	W	T	L	Goals	Pts
1.	Vörös Meteor Budapest	4	4	0	0	18:4	8
2.	BVSC Budapest	4	3	0	1	15:7	6
3.	Újpesti Dózsa SC	4	2	0	2	19:12	4
4.	Ferencvárosi TC	4	1	0	3	15:22	2
5.	Építõk Budapest	4	0	0	4	7:29	0
