= 1962–63 OB I bajnoksag season =

Hungarian ice hockey season

The 1962–63 OB I bajnokság season was the 26th season of the OB I bajnokság, the top level of ice hockey in Hungary. Six teams participated in the league, and Voros Meteor Budapest won the championship.

== Regular season ==
	Club	GP	W	T	L	Goals	Pts
1.	Vörös Meteor Budapest	15	11	2	2	79:28	24
2.	Újpesti Dózsa SC	15	11	1	3	120:39	23
3.	BVSC Budapest	15	10	1	4	59:36	21
4.	Ferencvárosi TC	15	8	0	7	72:53	16
5.	Építõk Budapest	15	3	0	12	45:79	6
6.	Postás Budapest	15	0	0	15	22:162	0
