= 1955–56 OB I bajnoksag season =

Hungarian ice hockey season

The 1955–56 OB I bajnokság season was the 19th season of the OB I bajnokság, the top level of ice hockey in Hungary. Six teams participated in the league, and Kinizsi SE Budapest won the championship.

== Regular season ==
	Club	GP	W	T	L	Goals	Pts
1.	Kinizsi SE Budapest	10	9	0	1	59:20	18
2.	Vörös Meteor Budapest	10	6	1	3	51:23	13
3.	Budapesti Dózsa	10	5	1	4	49:30	11
4.	Törekvés Budapest	10	5	1	4	35:29	11
5.	Építõk Budapest	10	2	2	6	27:46	6
6.	Szikra Budapest	10	0	1	9	13:86	1
