= 1961–62 OB I bajnoksag season =

Hungarian ice hockey season

The 1961–62 OB I bajnokság season was the 25th season of the OB I bajnokság, the top level of ice hockey in Hungary. Six teams participated in the league, and Ferencvarosi TC won the championship.

== Regular season ==
	Club	GP	W	T	L	Goals	Pts
1.	Ferencvárosi TC	15	12	2	1	103:48	26
2.	Újpesti Dózsa SC	15	10	3	2	113:49	23
3.	BVSC Budapest	15	8	1	6	57:38	17
4.	Vörös Meteor Budapest	15	7	1	7	77:52	15
5.	Építõk Budapest	15	3	1	11	49:87	7
6.	Postás Budapest	15	1	0	14	32:157	2
