= 1957–58 OB I bajnoksag season =

Hungarian ice hockey season

The 1957–58 OB I bajnokság season was the 21st season of the OB I bajnokság, the top level of ice hockey in Hungary. Five teams participated in the league, and Ujpesti Dozsa SC won the championship.

== Standings ==
| | Club | GP | W | T | L | Goals | Pts |
|---|---|---|---|---|---|---|---|
| 1. | Újpesti Dózsa SC | 8 | 7 | 1 | 0 | 47:17 | 15 |
| 2. | Vörös Meteor Budapest | 8 | 2 | 4 | 2 | 17:16 | 8 |
| 3. | BVSC Budapest | 8 | 3 | 2 | 3 | 17:25 | 8 |
| 4. | Ferencvárosi TC | 8 | 2 | 3 | 3 | 23:22 | 7 |
| 5. | Építõk Budapest | 8 | 1 | 0 | 7 | 15:39 | 2 |
