= 1969–70 OB I bajnoksag season =

Hungarian ice hockey season

The 1969–70 OB I bajnokság season was the 33rd season of the OB I bajnokság, the top level of ice hockey in Hungary. Six teams participated in the league, and Ujpesti Dozsa SC won the championship.

== Regular season ==
	Club	GP	W	T	L	Goals	Pts
1.	Újpesti Dózsa SC	30	26	0	4	197:75	52
2.	Ferencvárosi TC	30	24	1	5	220:82	49
3.	Budapesti Vasutas SC	30	17	3	10	181:80	37
4.	Elõre Budapest	30	11	2	17	109:156	24
5.	Építõk Budapest	30	8	0	22	67:163	16
6.	Vörös Meteor Budapest	30	1	0	29	51:269	2
