= 1958–59 OB I bajnoksag season =

Hungarian ice hockey season

The 1958–59 OB I bajnokság season was the 22nd season of the OB I bajnokság, the top level of ice hockey in Hungary. Five teams participated in the league, and Voros Meteor Budapest won the championship.

== Regular season ==
	Club	GP	W	T	L	Goals	Pts
1.	Újpesti Dózsa SC	8	5	0	3	56:25	10
2.	Ferencvárosi TC	8	5	0	3	35:21	10
3.	Vörös Meteor Budapest	8	5	0	3	33:25	10
4.	BVSC Budapest	8	5	0	3	37:29	10
5.	Építõk Budapest	8	0	0	8	15:76	0

=== 1st-4th place ===
	Club	GP	W	T	L	Goals	Pts
1.	Vörös Meteor Budapest	3	2	0	1	10:10	4
2.	Ferencvárosi TC	3	1	1	1	9:9	3
3.	BVSC Budapest	3	1	1	1	6:8	3
4.	Újpesti Dózsa SC	3	1	0	2	10:8	2
