= 1989–90 Nemzeti Bajnokság III =

Nemzeti Bajnokság III
- Season: 1989–90
- Champions: Kecskeméti TE (Alföld); Sabaria SE (Bakony); Paksi Atomerőmű SE (Dráva); BKV Előre SC (Duna); Hatvani KVSC-Deko (Mátra); Kabai Egyetértés SE (Tisza)
- Promoted: Kecskeméti TE (Alföld); Sabaria SE (Bakony); Paksi Atomerőmű SE (Dráva); BKV Előre SC (Duna); Hatvani KVSC-Deko (Mátra); Kabai Egyetértés SE (Tisza)

The 1989–90 Nemzeti Bajnokság III season was the 8th edition of the Nemzeti Bajnokság III.

== League tables ==
=== Alföld group ===
Pos	Team	Pld	W	D	L	GF	GA	GD	Pts	Promotion or relegation
1	Kecskeméti TE	30	19	3	8	55	31	+24	60	Promotion to Nemzeti Bajnokság II
2	Honvéd Bem József SE	30	18	5	7	58	32	+26	59	
3	Miskei TSZ SK	30	15	9	6	52	28	+24	54	
4	Rákosmenti TE	30	16	4	10	63	37	+26	52	
5	Kiskőrösi Petőfi SK	30	15	2	13	65	42	+23	47	
6	Dabasi SE	30	12	7	11	45	48	−3	43	
7	Csongrádi VSE	30	12	7	11	28	33	−5	43	
8	Orosházi MTK	30	12	6	12	35	35	0	42	
9	Mezőhegyesi SE	30	12	5	13	38	50	−12	41	
10	Mezőkovácsházi TE	30	11	7	12	45	42	+3	40	
11	Gyulai SE	30	10	9	11	44	45	−1	39	
12	Malév SC	30	12	3	15	44	54	−10	39	
13	Nagyszénási SE	30	12	3	15	35	47	−12	39	
14	Tápéi SE	30	9	9	12	44	61	−17	36	Relegation to Megyei Bajnokság I
15	Szentesi SE	30	8	5	17	36	51	−15	29	
16	Kiskunhalasi AC	30	2	6	22	21	72	−51	12	Relegation to Megyei Bajnokság I

=== Bakony group ===
Pos	Team	Pld	W	D	L	GF	GA	GD	Pts	Promotion or relegation
1	Sabaria SE	30	22	3	5	72	20	+52	69	Promotion to Nemzeti Bajnokság II
2	Ajkai Bányász SK	30	18	8	4	66	21	+45	62	
3	Győri Dózsa SE	30	18	7	5	43	14	+29	61	
4	Motim TE	30	14	7	9	45	28	+17	49	
5	Betka-MÁV DAC	30	13	9	8	49	40	+9	48	
6	MÁV Nagykanizsai TE	30	11	7	12	38	44	−6	40	
7	Nike Fűzfői AK	30	11	7	12	33	42	−9	40	
8	Honvéd Katona József SE	30	10	9	11	37	35	+2	39	
9	Pápai SE	30	10	7	13	33	45	−12	37	
10	Celldömölki VSE	30	8	12	10	38	41	−3	36	
11	Petőháza	30	9	9	12	36	41	−5	36	
12	Körmendi FC	30	8	12	10	42	54	−12	36	
13	Répcelaki Bányász	30	9	8	13	42	44	−2	35	
14	Lenti TE	30	9	4	17	26	52	−26	31	
15	Soproni Postás	30	6	9	15	35	64	−29	27	
16	Badacsonytomaj	30	2	6	22	22	72	−50	12	Relegation to Megyei Bajnokság I

=== Dráva group ===
Pos	Team	Pld	W	D	L	GF	GA	GD	Pts	Promotion or relegation
1	Paksi Atomerőmű SE	30	25	2	3	85	13	+72	77	Promotion to Nemzeti Bajnokság II
2	Kaposvári Rákóczi FC	30	23	1	6	57	25	+32	70	
3	Kaposvári Honvéd SE	30	12	12	6	38	20	+18	48	
4	Bólyi MEDOSZ SE	30	13	8	9	50	38	+12	47	
5	Boglárlellei SE	30	14	3	13	31	46	−15	45	
6	Siklósi SE	30	14	2	14	53	44	+9	44	
7	Sombereki SE	30	11	9	10	43	38	+5	42	
8	Marcali VSE	30	11	8	11	29	41	−12	41	
9	Kaposvári Építők SC	30	10	10	10	41	35	+6	40	
10	Dombóvári Vasas SC	30	10	10	10	36	35	+1	40	
11	Csurgói Spartacus	30	10	7	13	37	42	−5	37	
12	Mázaszászvári Bányász	30	10	6	14	31	41	−10	36	
13	Nagymányoki Brikett	30	7	10	13	36	45	−9	31	Relegation to Megyei Bajnokság I
14	Szigetvári SE	30	8	6	16	34	50	−16	30	
15	Bonyhádi MSC	30	6	6	18	39	62	−23	24	Relegation to Megyei Bajnokság I
16	Nagykanizsai Volán Dózsa	30	4	4	22	33	98	−65	16	Relegation to Megyei Bajnokság I

=== Duna group ===
Pos	Team	Pld	W	D	L	GF	GA	GD	Pts	Promotion or relegation
1	BKV Előre SC	30	20	7	3	70	25	+45	67	Promotion to Nemzeti Bajnokság II
2	Erzsébeti SMTK	30	19	6	5	54	23	+31	63	
3	Dömsödi SE	30	16	8	6	45	27	+18	56	
4	Dunai Kőolaj SK	30	16	7	7	45	30	+15	55	
5	Érdi VSE	30	15	7	8	51	33	+18	52	
6	Pénzügyőr SE	30	14	9	7	37	27	+10	51	
7	Honvéd Budai SE	30	12	13	5	40	30	+10	49	
8	Esztergomi Vasas SC	30	13	8	9	43	34	+9	47	
9	Péti Munkás TE	30	12	8	10	46	35	+11	44	
10	Dunakeszi Vasutas SE	30	9	8	13	41	47	−6	35	
11	Peremartoni SC	30	10	5	15	40	51	−11	35	
12	Várpalotai Bányász SK	30	6	8	16	26	41	−15	26	
13	Tatai Honvéd AC	30	5	9	16	24	47	−23	24	
14	Sárisápi Bányász SE	30	4	11	15	28	52	−24	23	
15	Magyar Kábel SC	30	4	5	21	16	63	−47	17	Relegation to Megyei Bajnokság I
16	Ercsi Kinizsi SE	30	2	7	21	27	68	−41	13	

=== Mátra group ===
Pos	Team	Pld	W	D	L	GF	GA	GD	Pts	Promotion or relegation
1	Hatvani KVSC-Deko	30	20	5	5	62	24	+38	65	Promotion to Nemzeti Bajnokság II
2	Gödöllői SC	30	18	6	6	62	31	+31	60	
3	Salgótarjáni Kohász SE	30	17	8	5	56	29	+27	59	
4	Jászberényi SE-Vasas	30	14	6	10	55	37	+18	48	
5	Salgótarjáni BTC	30	14	5	11	40	30	+10	47	
6	Bagi SE	30	13	7	10	52	41	+11	46	
7	Gyöngyösi AK	30	10	14	6	40	27	+13	44	
8	Volán Rákóczi	30	12	8	10	48	36	+12	44	
9	Romhányi KSE	30	13	5	12	55	44	+11	44	
10	Törökszentmiklósi FC	30	13	5	12	48	54	−6	44	
11	Balassagyarmati HVSE	30	11	5	14	30	45	−15	38	
12	Honvéd Gáspár György SE	30	11	4	15	31	42	−11	37	
13	Apci Vasas	30	10	6	14	45	46	−1	36	
14	Nézsa SE	30	9	4	17	44	73	−29	31	
15	Szolnoki Vegyiművek SE	30	5	5	20	29	72	−43	20	Relegation to Megyei Bajnokság I
16	Nagybátonyi Bányász SC	30	2	3	25	21	87	−66	9	Relegation to Megyei Bajnokság I

=== Tisza group ===
Pos	Team	Pld	W	D	L	GF	GA	GD	Pts	Promotion
1	Kabai Egyetértés SE	30	18	10	2	65	26	+39	64	Promotion to Nemzeti Bajnokság II
2	Ózdi Kohász SE	30	18	5	7	45	25	+20	59	
3	Tiszavasvári Lombik SE	30	16	7	7	60	29	+31	55	
4	Balmazújvárosi Lenin TSz SE	30	15	10	5	54	25	+29	55	
5	Borsodi Építők Volán SC	30	14	8	8	50	23	+27	50	
6	Rakamazi Spartacus SE	30	13	8	9	48	31	+17	47	
7	Mádi Bányász SE	30	11	11	8	42	36	+6	44	
8	Hajdúböszörményi Bocskai SE	30	11	7	12	35	35	0	40	
9	Edelényi Bányász SE	30	9	12	9	38	32	+6	39	
10	Kisvárdai SE	30	10	8	12	36	34	+2	38	
11	Mátészalkai MTK	30	9	9	12	24	40	−16	36	
12	Olefin SC	30	9	7	14	51	47	+4	34	
13	Hajdúnánási Bocskai SE	30	8	10	12	39	40	−1	34	
14	Sajóbábonyi Vegyész SE (Note: replaced Borsodi Bányász)	30	10	4	16	32	47	−15	34	
15	Hajdúszoboszlói Bocskai SE	30	5	4	21	31	74	−43	19	
16	Szeghalmi SC	30	2	4	24	18	124	−106	8 (Note: 2 points deducted)	

== See also ==
- 1989–90 Magyar Kupa
- 1989–90 Nemzeti Bajnokság I
- 1989–90 Nemzeti Bajnokság II
