= 1950–51 OB I bajnoksag season =

Hungarian ice hockey season

The 1950–51 OB I bajnokság season was the 14th season of the OB I bajnokság, the top level of ice hockey in Hungary. Eight teams participated in the league, and Kinizsi SE Budapest won the championship.

== Regular season ==
	Club	GP	W	T	L	Goals	Pts
1.	Kinizsi SE Budapest	7	7	0	0	85:14	14
2.	Vörös Meteor Budapest	7	6	0	1	57:9	12
3.	Vörös Lobogó Budapest	7	5	0	2	83:17	10
4.	Építõk Budapest	7	4	0	3	41:32	8
5.	Postás Budapest	7	3	0	4	29:23	6
6.	Szikra Budapest	7	2	0	5	17:58	4
7.	Vörös Meteor II	7	1	0	6	13:71	2
8.	Kispesti Postás	7	0	0	7	7:108	0
