= 1951–52 OB I bajnoksag season =

Hungarian ice hockey season

The 1951–52 OB I bajnokság season was the 15th season of the OB I bajnokság, the top level of ice hockey in Hungary. Six teams participated in the league, and Voros Meteor Budapest won the championship.

== Regular season ==
	Club	GP	W	T	L	Goals	Pts
1.	Vörös Meteor Budapest	10	7	2	1	52:14	16
2.	Postás Közhír	10	6	3	1	52:12	15
3.	Kinizsi SE Budapest	10	6	1	3	46:21	13
4.	Építõk Budapest	10	5	2	3	32:28	12
5.	Postás Budapest	10	1	0	9	10:58	2
6.	Szikra Budapest	10	1	0	9	9:68	2
