= 1954–55 OB I bajnoksag season =

Hungarian ice hockey season

The 1954–55 OB I bajnokság season was the 18th season of the OB I bajnokság, the top level of ice hockey in Hungary. Six teams participated in the league, and Kinzsi SE Budapest won the championship.

== Regular season ==
	Club	GP	W	T	L	Goals	Pts
1.	Kinizsi SE Budapest	10	6	3	1	60:25	15
2.	Postás Budapest	10	7	1	2	68:21	15
3.	Vörös Meteor Budapest	10	6	2	2	66:21	14
4.	Építõk Budapest	10	5	2	3	35:24	12
5.	Szikra Budapest	10	2	0	8	27:53	4
6.	Gyõri Vasas	10	0	0	10	4:116	0

=== 1st place game ===
- Kinizsi SE Budapest - Postás Budapest 4:2
