= 1968–69 OB I bajnoksag season =

Hungarian ice hockey season

The 1968–69 OB I bajnokság season was the 32nd season of the OB I bajnokság, the top level of ice hockey in Hungary. Eight teams participated in the league, and Ujpesti Dozsa SC won the championship.

== Regular season ==
| | Club | GP | W | T | L | Goals | Pts |
|---|---|---|---|---|---|---|---|
| 1. | Újpesti Dózsa SC | 28 | 25 | 2 | 1 | 222:61 | 52 |
| 2. | BVSC Budapest | 28 | 22 | 3 | 3 | 192:48 | 47 |
| 3. | Ferencvárosi TC | 28 | 20 | 2 | 6 | 201:85 | 42 |
| 4. | Hungarian Juniors | 28 | 10 | 4 | 14 | 92:175 | 24 |
| 5. | Vörös Meteor Budapest | 28 | 9 | 5 | 14 | 90:126 | 23 |
| 6. | Építõk Budapest | 28 | 9 | 0 | 19 | 86:152 | 18 |
| 7. | Elõre Budapest | 28 | 5 | 4 | 19 | 93:144 | 14 |
| 8. | Postás Budapest | 28 | 2 | 0 | 26 | 43:228 | 4 |
