= 1969 Nemzeti Bajnokság II =

Nemzeti Bajnokság II
- Season: 1969
- Champions: Videoton SC
- Promoted: Videoton SC (winners); Szegedi EOL (runners-up)
- Relegated: Győri Dózsa SE; Miskolci VSC; Nagybátonyi Bányász SC

The 1969 Nemzeti Bajnokság II was the 71st season of the Nemzeti Bajnokság II, the second tier of the Hungarian football league.

== League table ==
Pos	Team	Pld	W	D	L	GF	GA	GD	Pts	Promotion or relegation
1	Videoton SC	34	24	3	7	92	46	+46	51	Promotion to Nemzeti Bajnokság I
2	Szegedi EOL (Note: SZEOL were awarded 2 points after the match Kecskemét-SZEOL that ended with a 0-0 draw.)	34	19	8	7	64	41	+23	46	Promotion to Nemzeti Bajnokság I
3	Zalaegerszegi TE	34	15	10	9	63	37	+26	40	
4	Pécsi Bányász	34	15	9	10	51	40	+11	39	
5	Békéscsabai Előre SC	34	15	8	11	49	41	+8	38	
6	Várpalotai Bányász SK	34	16	5	13	46	39	+7	37	
7	Budapesti Spartacus SC	34	12	11	11	59	51	+8	35	
8	Oroszlányi Bányász SK	34	14	7	13	52	50	+2	35	
9	Kecskeméti Dózsa	34	13	8	13	41	37	+4	34	
10	Szolnoki MTE	34	10	13	11	37	44	−7	33	
11	FŐSPED Szállítók SE	34	11	10	13	52	55	−3	32	
12	Székesfehérvári MÁV Előre SC	34	12	7	15	37	44	−7	31	
13	Ganz-MÁVAG SE	34	11	9	14	35	43	−8	31	
14	Ózdi Kohász SE	34	11	8	15	39	43	−4	30	
15	BKV Előre SC	34	9	12	13	33	39	−6	30	
16	Győri Dózsa SE	34	8	12	14	40	56	−16	28	Relegation to Nemzeti Bajnokság III
17	Miskolci VSC	34	7	8	19	26	63	−37	22	Relegation to Nemzeti Bajnokság III
18	Nagybátonyi Bányász SC	34	8	4	22	30	77	−47	20	Relegation to Nemzeti Bajnokság III

== See also ==
- 1969 Magyar Kupa
- 1969 Nemzeti Bajnokság I
- 1969 Nemzeti Bajnokság III
