= 1973–74 Nemzeti Bajnokság II =

Nemzeti Bajnokság II
- Season: 1973–74
- Champions: Diósgyőri VTK
- Promoted: Diósgyőri VTK (winners); Békéscsaba 1912 Előre (runners-up)
- Relegated: Kecskeméti SC; Pénzügyőr SE

The 1973–74 Nemzeti Bajnokság II was the 76th season of the Nemzeti Bajnokság II, the second tier of the Hungarian football league.

== League table ==
Pos	Team	Pld	W	D	L	GF	GA	GD	Pts	Promotion or relegation
1	Diósgyőri VTK	34	19	9	6	66	25	+41	47	Promotion to Nemzeti Bajnokság I
2	Békéscsabai ESSC	34	18	10	6	43	25	+18	46	Promotion to Nemzeti Bajnokság I
3	Komlói Bányász SK	34	18	7	9	41	25	+16	43	
4	Szolnoki MTE	34	15	9	10	46	36	+10	39	
5	MÁV DAC	34	13	11	10	44	35	+9	37	
6	Dunaújvárosi Kohász SE	34	12	12	10	48	44	+4	36	
7	Nagykanizsai Olajbányász SE	34	12	10	12	37	44	−7	34	
8	Kossuth KFSE	34	12	9	13	41	43	−2	33	
9	Budafoki MTE	34	11	11	12	40	47	−7	33	
10	Szekszárdi Dózsa	34	11	10	13	21	24	−3	32	
11	Egri Dózsa	34	11	9	14	44	51	−7	31	
12	Ganz Mávag	34	10	11	13	30	41	−11	31	
13	Oroszlányi Bányász SK	34	11	8	15	34	40	−6	30	
14	Debreceni VSC	34	7	16	11	30	37	−7	30	
15	Budapesti Spartacus SC	34	11	8	15	40	48	−8	30	
16	Kecskeméti SC	34	9	12	13	41	52	−11	30	Relegation to Nemzeti Bajnokság III
17	Pénzügyőr	34	11	7	16	46	58	−12	29	Relegation to Nemzeti Bajnokság III
18	Várpalotai Bányász SK	34	6	9	19	25	42	−17	21	

== Relegation play-offs ==
Pos	Team	Pld	W	D	L	GF	GA	GD	Pts
1	Várpalotai Bányász SK	2	2	0	0	5	2	+3	4
2	Pénzügyőr SE	1	0	0	1	1	2	−1	0
3	Kecskeméti SC	1	0	0	1	1	3	−2	0

== See also ==
- 1973–74 Magyar Kupa
- 1973–74 Nemzeti Bajnokság I
