= Kőbányai Dózsa SE =

Hungarian football club

- Full name: Kőbányai Dózsa SE
- Founded: 1930
Home colours	Away colours

Kőbányai Dózsa Sport Egyesület was a football club from the town of Kőbánya, Budapest, Hungary.

== History ==
The club was formed as Fűzfői Bástya in Balatonfűzfő. Later the club was moved to Veszprém and in 1953 the club was moved to Kőbánya, Budapest.

Kőbánya won the 1954 Nemzeti Bajnokság II season. The coach was László Fenyvesi and the team included Zsámboki, Forgács, Orosz, Polgár, Lung, Beliczky, Urbán, Pozsgai, Gulyás, Hentes, Fazekas, Rendek, and Pleck. Although the club won the promotion playoff, it was merged with Pécsi Dózsa, as Pécsi MFC, on 25 January 1955.

== Name changes ==
- Fűzfői Bástya: ? – 1951
- move to Veszprém in 1951
- Veszprémi Bástya: 1951 – 1953
- move to Budapest in 1953
- Kőbányai Bástya: 1953 – 1953
- Kőbányai Dózsa SE: 1953 – 1955
- On 25 January 1955, merger with Pécsi Dózsába

== Honours ==
=== League ===
- Nemzeti Bajnokság II:
  - Winner (1): 1954
