= 1970–71 Nemzeti Bajnokság I =

Nemzeti Bajnokság I
- Season: 1970–71

Final standings of the 1970–71 Hungarian League season

== Final standings ==
Extra points were awarded to the teams according to their position in the 1970 Spring Championship. The winner of each group received 8 points, whilst the remaining teams got 7-1 points according their standing.

Pos	Team	Pld	W	D	L	GF	GA	GD	BP	Pts	Qualification or relegation
1	Újpesti Dózsa (C)	30	18	7	5	71	29	+42	8	51	Qualification for European Cup first round
2	Ferencváros	30	16	9	5	52	26	+26	8	49	Qualification for UEFA Cup first round
3	Vasas	30	19	3	8	61	25	+36	6	47	Qualification for UEFA Cup first round
4	Budapest Honvéd	30	14	8	8	54	37	+17	7	43	
5	MTK Budapest	30	10	13	7	46	35	+11	7	40	
6	Csepel	30	9	14	7	35	27	+8	6	38	
7	Salgótarján	30	14	6	10	46	46	0	2	36	
8	Tatabányai Bányász	30	12	6	12	47	35	+12	4	34	
9	Rába ETO Győr	30	13	6	11	37	34	+3	1	33	
10	Videoton	30	9	12	9	29	33	−4	3	33	
11	Pécsi Dózsa	30	8	12	10	28	34	−6	5	33	
12	Diósgyőr	30	10	7	13	24	46	−22	5	32	
13	Haladás	30	9	7	14	40	52	−12	3	28	
14	Komlói Bányász	30	7	10	13	35	53	−18	2	26	Qualification for Cup Winners' Cup first round
15	Dunaújvárosi Kohász (R)	30	3	7	20	23	69	−46	4	17	Relegation to Nemzeti Bajnokság II
16	SZEOL (R)	30	3	5	22	28	75	−47	1	12	Relegation to Nemzeti Bajnokság II

Source: rsssf.com
(C) Champions; (R) Relegated

== Results ==
Home \ Away	CSE	DIÓ	DUN	FTC	HAL	HON	KOM	MTK	PÉC	GYŐ	SAL	SZE	TAT	ÚJP	VAS	VID
Csepel		1–1	3–0	0–0	0–0	2–1	2–0	1–1	0–1	2–1	2–2	5–0	0–1	1–1	0–1	4–0
Diósgyőr	0–0		1–0	1–1	1–0	3–1	1–1	1–0	2–0	1–0	0–0	2–2	1–0	0–1	0–1	2–2
Dunaújvárosi Kohász	1–1	0–1		1–3	0–3	0–1	2–1	2–1	2–2	2–3	0–0	2–4	1–3	0–0	0–2	1–0
Ferencváros	1–1	2–0	2–0		3–0	4–2	3–0	0–1	3–1	1–2	0–1	4–0	3–0	2–2	1–0	2–0
Haladás	1–1	3–2	5–1	1–0		2–0	2–0	2–2	0–0	2–1	1–2	1–0	4–2	0–0	2–3	1–1
Budapest Honvéd	1–1	2–0	3–0	1–1	3–0		4–1	1–3	0–0	4–0	5–4	2–0	3–1	0–0	1–1	2–1
Komlói Bányász	1–2	1–0	2–2	2–2	3–1	0–2		1–1	1–1	1–1	2–2	4–1	2–2	0–6	0–1	0–0
MTK Budapest	1–1	4–1	2–2	1–1	3–3	2–2	0–1		1–1	1–1	3–0	2–0	1–0	0–1	2–1	2–1
Pécsi Dózsa	2–2	0–1	3–0	0–0	4–1	0–0	0–2	0–0		1–0	0–0	2–1	0–0	1–2	3–1	1–0
Rába ETO Győr	1–0	3–0	2–0	1–1	2–1	3–0	1–0	1–1	0–1		3–0	2–0	1–0	2–1	1–2	0–0
Salgótarján	1–2	4–0	3–1	0–1	4–1	3–1	3–2	1–0	3–2	3–0		1–0	3–1	2–1	1–0	1–2
SZEOL	0–1	0–1	2–1	3–5	3–0	0–6	1–1	2–5	0–0	1–2	1–1		1–3	3–4	0–2	1–1
Tatabányai Bányász	2–0	4–0	1–0	1–2	2–0	2–2	1–2	3–0	4–0	2–0	4–0	4–1		2–2	0–0	1–1
Újpesti Dózsa	1–0	5–1	8–0	0–1	4–2	3–2	3–0	3–2	5–1	1–0	5–0	5–1	1–0		3–1	1–1
Vasas	4–0	6–0	6–1	2–0	3–0	0–1	6–1	0–3	2–1	3–1	4–1	5–0	2–0	2–1		0–1
Videoton	0–0	2–0	1–1	2–3	2–1	0–1	0–3	1–1	1–0	2–2	2–0	1–0	2–1	2–1	0–0	

Source: rsssf.com
Legend: Blue = home team win; Yellow = draw; Red = away team win.

== Statistical leaders ==
=== Top goalscorers ===
Rank	Scorer	Club	Goals
1	(Hungary) Mihály Kozma	Budapest Honvéd	25
2	(Hungary) Ferenc Bene	Újpesti Dózsa	24
3	(Hungary) László Branikovits	Ferencvárosi TC	17
3	(Hungary) Tibor Juhász	Komlói Bányász	17
5	(Hungary) Antal Dunai	Újpesti Dózsa	15
6	(Hungary) Kálmán Tóth	Tatabányai Bányász	14
7	(Hungary) László Fazekas	Újpesti Dózsa	13
8	(Hungary) Lajos Puskás	Vasas SC	11
9	(Hungary) Ferenc Horváth	Salgótarjáni BTC	10
9	(Hungary) János Máté	Pécsi Dózsa SC	10
9	(Hungary) János Stolcz	Rába Vasas ETO	10

== Attendances ==
#	Club	Average
1	Ferencváros	27,500
2	Vasas	14,375
3	Újpest	13,000
4	Diósgyör	11,500
5	Budapest Honvéd	9,125
6	Fehérvár	8,625
7	Tatabánya Bányász	7,875
8	Haladás	6,875
9	MTK	6,250
10	Csepel	6,250
11	SZEOL	5,313
12	Pécs	4,938
13	Salgótarján	4,625
14	Dunaújváros	4,438
15	Komlói Bányász	4,375
16	Győr	3,625
