= Szolnoki Légierő SK =

Hungarian football club

- Full name: Szolnoki Légierő Sport Klub
- Founded: 1951
- Dissolved: 1957
- Ground: Véső utca pálya
Home colours

Szolnoki Légierő Sport Klub was a Hungarian football club from the town of Szolnok, Hungary.

== History ==
Szolnoki Légierő Sport Klub debuted in the 1955 season of the Hungarian League and finished fourteenth.

== Name Changes ==
- 1951–1953: Mátyásföldi Honvéd Iljusin SK
- 1953–1957: Légierő SK
- 1954: moved to Szolnok
- 1957: merger with Vasas Ikarus and Mátyásföldi SC as Mátyásföldi-Ikarus
