= 1971–72 Magyar Kupa =

Tournament details
- Country: Hungary

Final positions
- Champions: Ferencvárosi TC
- Runners-up: Tatabányai Bányász SC

The 1971–72 Magyar Kupa (English: Hungarian Cup) was the 32nd season of Hungary's annual knock-out cup football competition.

== Final ==
1 May 1972
17:00 (UTC+2)

| Ferencvárosi TC | 2–1 | Tatabányai Bányász SC |
|---|---|---|
| Vépi 18'; Albert 84' | Report | Kőműves 47' |

Megyeri úti Stadium, Budapest
Attendance: 8,000
Referee: József Katona (Hungary)

== See also ==
- 1971–72 Nemzeti Bajnokság I
