= 1955 Nemzeti Bajnokság I =

Nemzeti Bajnokság I
- Season: 1955
- Champions: Budapest Honvéd FC

Statistics of Nemzeti Bajnokság I in the 1955 season.

== Overview ==
It was contested by 14 teams, and Budapest Honvéd FC won the championship.

== League standings ==
Pos	Team	Pld	W	D	L	GF	GA	GR	Pts	Qualification or relegation
1	Budapest Honvéd FC (C)	26	20	5	1	99	47	2.106	45	
2	Budapesti Vörös Lobogó	26	18	5	3	71	29	2.448	41	Qualification for the European Cup
3	Bp Kinizsi	26	15	7	4	64	27	2.370	37	
4	Vasas SC	26	16	4	6	62	39	1.590	36	
5	Dorogi Bányász	26	9	11	6	39	35	1.114	29	
6	Salgótarjáni BTC	26	6	12	8	31	51	0.608	24	
7	Pécsi Dózsa	26	8	7	11	29	39	0.744	23	
8	Bp. Dózsa	26	7	8	11	45	44	1.023	22	
9	Csepel SC	26	7	8	11	34	42	0.810	22	
10	Szombathelyi Törekvés	26	9	4	13	41	57	0.719	22	
11	Győri Vasas	26	7	7	12	44	57	0.772	21	
12	Diósgyőri VTK	26	6	7	13	40	53	0.755	19	
13	ÚTE Izzó	26	4	5	17	24	60	0.400	13	
14	Szolnoki Légierő SK	26	3	4	19	17	60	0.283	10	

Source: rsssf.com
(C) Champions

== Results ==
Home \ Away	CSE	DIÓ	DOR	DÓZ	GYŐ	HON	KIN	PÉC	SAL	SZO	TÖR	ÚTE	VAS	VÖR
Csepel		1–1	0–0	0–0	3–1	2–4	1–0	2–2	0–0	1–0	0–1	1–0	2–3	1–2
Diósgyőr	1–1		2–3	1–4	3–1	3–5	1–4	2–2	3–3	0–2	2–2	0–2	1–2	1–2
Dorogi Bányász	2–0	2–4		1–0	1–1	1–3	0–0	0–0	1–2	1–0	3–1	2–1	4–5	1–1
Budapesti Dózsa	3–3	0–0	0–1		1–1	3–7	2–3	1–2	1–0	0–2	2–3	2–2	0–0	2–2
Győri Vasas	1–3	5–1	2–2	1–4		3–7	1–1	2–2	1–1	0–2	5–1	5–2	0–1	3–2
Budapest Honvéd	3–2	2–1	1–1	6–4	3–2		0–0	0–2	5–1	2–1	4–3	6–1	3–1	5–2
Budapesti Kinizsi	4–1	2–0	3–1	0–4	6–1	4–4		5–0	1–1	7–0	3–0	3–0	1–2	1–3
Pécsi Dózsa	1–0	2–3	1–1	1–0	1–2	0–5	0–1		2–4	0–0	3–0	1–2	1–2	0–1
Salgótarjáni	2–2	1–3	1–3	0–0	1–1	3–5	1–6	0–0		2–0	2–1	1–1	2–1	1–1
Szolnoki Légierő	1–5	1–2	1–4	0–3	1–3	1–7	0–2	0–1	0–0		0–1	0–0	0–3	0–2
Törekvés	0–1	1–1	2–2	2–4	1–0	0–4	3–5	2–0	3–0	2–2		2–1	1–3	2–0
ÚTE Izzó	1–0	0–3	0–0	1–3	0–2	2–4	1–1	0–1	0–1	1–0	2–6		0–4	0–5
Vasas	6–1	2–1	2–2	3–2	2–0	1–1	0–1	3–4	1–1	3–0	5–1	4–2		2–3
Vörös Lobogó	3–1	1–0	2–0	2–0	5–0	3–3	0–0	1–0	9–0	8–3	3–0	3–2	5–1	

Source: rsssf.com
Legend: Blue = home team win; Yellow = draw; Red = away team win.

== Statistical leaders ==
=== Top goalscorers ===
Rank	Scorer	Club	Goals
1	(Hungary) Zoltán Czibor	Budapest Honvéd	20
1	(Hungary) Ferenc Machos	Budapest Honvéd	20
3	(Hungary) Ferenc Puskás	Budapest Honvéd	18
4	(Hungary) Sándor Kocsis	Budapest Honvéd	17
4	(Hungary) Ferenc Szusza	Budapesti Dózsa	17
6	(Hungary) Lajos Csordás	Vasas SC	16
6	(Hungary) Nándor Hidegkuti	Vörös Lobogó	16
6	(Hungary) Péter Palotás	Vörös Lobogó	16
9	(Hungary) László Koós	Győri Vasas	14
9	(Hungary) Pál Orosz	Budapesti Kinizsi	14

== Attendances ==
#	Football club	Home games	Average attendance
1	Kinizsi	13	45,615
2	Budapest Honvéd	13	40,077
3	Budapesti Dózsa	13	25,000
4	Vörös Lobogó	13	22,538
5	Vasas SC	13	21,000
6	Pécsi Dózsa	13	16,077
7	ÚTE Izzó	13	15,346
8	DVTK	13	13,615
9	Csepel SC	13	9,423
10	Szombathelyi Törekvés	13	8,000
11	Győri Vasas	13	7,231
12	Szolnoki Légierő SK	13	6,000
13	Salgótarjáni BTC	13	5,962
14	Dorogi Bányász	13	4,615
