= 1970 Nemzeti Bajnokság II =

Nemzeti Bajnokság II
- Season: 1970
- Champions: Pécsi Bányász SC (Group A); FŐSPED Szállítók SE (Group B)
- Promoted: None
- Relegated: None

The 1970 Nemzeti Bajnokság II was the 72nd season of the Nemzeti Bajnokság II, the second tier of the Hungarian football league.

== League table ==
=== Group A ===
Pos	Team	Pld	W	D	L	GF	GA	GD	Pts
1	Pécsi Bányász	16	9	3	4	19	9	+10	21
2	Egyetértés SC	16	9	2	5	23	15	+8	20
3	Oroszlányi Bányász SK	16	8	4	4	22	16	+6	20
4	Győri MÁV DAC	16	5	8	3	17	10	+7	18
5	Zalaegerszegi TE	16	8	2	6	22	21	+1	18
6	Ganz-MÁVAG SE	16	5	5	6	20	20	0	15
7	BKV Előre SC	16	5	4	7	12	16	−4	14
8	Székesfehérvári MÁV Előre SC	16	4	2	10	17	28	−11	10
9	Várpalotai Bányász SK	16	2	4	10	10	27	−17	8

=== Group B ===
Pos	Team	Pld	W	D	L	GF	GA	GD	Pts
1	FŐSPED Szállítók SE	16	9	1	6	26	24	+2	19
2	Budapesti Spartacus SC	16	7	4	5	23	16	+7	18
3	Kecskeméti Dózsa	16	7	4	5	28	22	+6	18
4	Békéscsabai Előre	16	9	0	7	26	23	+3	18
5	Egri Dózsa	16	8	2	6	24	25	−1	18
6	Szolnoki MTE	16	5	5	6	22	22	0	15
7	Ózdi Kohász SE	16	6	3	7	23	26	−3	15
8	Debreceni VSC	16	4	5	7	19	22	−3	13
9	Budapesti VSC	16	2	6	8	22	33	−11	10

== Play-offs ==
Final: FŐSPED Szállítók SE - Pécsi Bányász SC 3–2, 2–2

3. place: Budapesti Spartacus - Egyetértés SC 2–1, 3–1

5, place: Kecskeméti Dózsa - Oroszlányi Bányász 1–4, 4–0

7. place: Békéscsabai Előre - Győri MÁV DAC 1–0, 2–2

9. place: Zalaegerszegi TE - Egri Dózsa 1–0, 2–1

11. place: Ganz-MÁVAG SE - Szolnoki MTE 2–0, 1–1

13. place: BKV Előre SC - Ózdi Kohász SE 1–0, 1–1

15. place: Székesfehérvári MÁV Előre - Debreceni VSC 4–1, 2–0

17. place: Budapesti VSC - Várpalotai Bányász 1–4, 4–1

== See also ==
- 1970 Magyar Kupa
- 1970 Nemzeti Bajnokság I
- 1970 Nemzeti Bajnokság III
