= Kabai Meteorit SE =

Hungarian football club

Kabai Meteorit Sport Egyesület
- Full name: Kabai Meteorit SE
- Founded: 1905
Home colours

Kabai Meteorit Sport Egyesület is a professional football club based in Kaba, Hajdú–Bihar County, Hungary.

== History ==
Kabai Meteorit SE won the Dráva group of the 1989–90 Nemzeti Bajnokság III season as Kabai Egyetértés SE and gained promotion to the second division.

== Name changes ==
- Kabai MTE: ? – 1948
- Kabai EPOSz SE: 1948 – 1950
- Kabai Mélyfúró: 1950 – 1955
- Kabai Bányász: 1955 – 1956
- Kabai Traktor: 1957 – 1962
- Kabai MEDOSZ SE: 1962 – 1975
- Kabai SE: 1975 – ?
- Kabai Egyetértés SE: ? – 1994
- Kabai Cukor FC: 1994 – 1995
- Kabai Meteorit SE: 1995 – present

== Honours ==
=== League ===
- Nemzeti Bajnokság III:
  - Winners (1): 1989–90

== Seasons ==
The table below shows the seasons of Kabai Meteorit SE. As of 27 October 2026.

Season	Tier	Club's name	Position	Pts
1945–46	3	Kabai MTE	0 / 6	
1946–47	4	Kabai MTE	3 / 12	24
1947–48	4	Kabai MTE	4 / 14	35
1948–49	4	Kabai EPOSz SE	13 / 16	15
1949–50	5	Kabai EPOSz SE	10 / 10	
1951	4	Kabai Mélyfúró	6 / 6	0
1952	4	Kabai Mélyfúró	0 / 5	
1954	4	Kabai Mélyfúró	1 / 12	36
1955	4	Kabai Bányász	3 / 12	24
1956	4	Kaba	0 / 12	
1957	4	Kaba	1 / 6	16
1957–58	4	Kabai Traktor	8 / 17	35
1958–59	4	Kabai Traktor	12 / 16	25
1959–60	4	Kabai Traktor	13 / 17	21
1960–61	4	Kabai Traktor	7 / 18	32
1961–62	4	Kabai Traktor	14 / 18	22
1962–63	5	Kabai MEDOSZ	1 / 13	42
1963	5	Kabai MEDOSZ	10 / 18	16
1964	5	Kabai MEDOSZ	14 / 16	22
1966	5	Kabai MEDOSZ	4 / 19	38
1967	5	Kabai MEDOSZ SE	8 / 16	27
1968	5	Kabai MEDOSZ	7 / 16	32
1969	5	Kabai MEDOSZ	12 / 16	24
1970	5	Kaba	6 / 8	12
1970–71	5	Kabai MEDOSZ	11 / 16	26
1971–72	5	Kabai MEDOSZ	13 / 16	25
1972–73	5	Kabai MEDOSZ	11 / 16	22
1973–74	5	Kabai MEDOSZ	10 / 16	22
1974–75	4	Kabai MEDOSZ	13 / 16	18
1975–76	4	Kabai SE	10 / 17	24
1976–77	4	Kabai SE	8 / 18	33
1977–78	4	Kabai SE	13 / 18	30
1978–79	3	Kabai SE	15 / 18	21
1979–80	3	Kabai SE	17 / 18	15
1980–81	4	Kaba	2 / 9	23
1981–82	5	Kaba	1 / 9	27
1982–83	4	Kabai Egyetértés SE	3 / 16	41
1983–84	4	Kabai Egyetértés SE	4 / 16	36
1984–85	4	Kabai Egyetértés SE	7 / 16	35
1985–86	4	Kabai Egyetértés SE	1 / 16	44
1986–87	3	Kabai Egyetértés SE	9 / 16	30
1987–88	3	Kabai Egyetértés SE	7 / 16	31
1988–89	3	Kabai Egyetértés SE	6 / 16	49
1989–90	3	Kabai Egyetértés SE	1 / 16	64
1990–91	2	Kabai Egyetértés	6 / 16	33
1991–92	2	Kabai Egyetértés SE	3 / 16	40
1992–93	2	Kabai Egyetértés SE	5 / 16	33
1993–94	2	Kabai Cukor FC	10 / 16	31
1994–95	2	Kabai Cukor FC	8 / 16	46
1995–96	4	Kabai Meteorit SE	4 / 16	52
1996–97	4	Kaba	5 / 18	52
1997–98	5	Kabai Meteorit	10 / 16	37
1998–99	5	Kaba	1 / 16	68
1999–2000	4	Kaba	14 / 16	21
2000–01	5	Kabai Meteorit	17 / 18	8
2001–02	5	Kabai Meteorit	12 / 16	25
2002–03	5	Kabai Meteorit	7 / 16	38
2003–04	5	Kabai Meteorit	13 / 16	27
2004–05	5	Kabai Meteorit	5 / 16	55
2005–06	4	Kabai Meteorit SE	4 / 16	55
2006–07	4	Kabai Meteorit SE	6 / 16	50
2007–08	4	Kabai Meteorit SE	7 / 18	56
2008–09	4	Kabai Meteorit SE	3 / 18	69
2009–10	4	Kabai Meteorit SE	6 / 16	51
2010–11	4	Kabai Meteorit SE	6 / 16	50
2011–12	4	Kabai Meteorit SE	14 / 16	28
2012–13	4	Kabai Meteorit SE	16 / 16	23
2013–14	5	Kabai Meteorit SE	5 / 16	53
2014–15	5	Kabai Meteorit SE	5 / 16	60
2015–16	5	Kabai Meteorit SE	1 / 15	63
2016–17	4	Kabai Meteorit SE	10 / 16	36
2017–18	4	Kabai Meteorit SE	12 / 16	21
2018–19	4	Kabai Meteorit SE	16 / 16	16
2019–20	4	Kabai Meteorit SE	6 / 16	32
2020–21	4	Kabai Meteorit SE	8 / 16	46
2021–22	4	Kabai Meteorit SE	5 / 16	54
2022–23	4	Kabai Meteorit SE	11 / 16	38
2023–24	5	Kabai Meteorit SE	1 / 11	52
2024–25	4	Kabai Meteorit SE	10 / 16	36
2025–26	4	Kabai Meteorit SE	12 / 16	30
