= 1972–73 Nemzeti Bajnokság II =

Nemzeti Bajnokság II
- Season: 1972–73
- Champions: Haladás VSE
- Promoted: Haladás VSE (winners); Dorogi FC (runners-up)
- Relegated: Volán SC; BKV Előre SC; Miskolci VSC

The 1972–73 Nemzeti Bajnokság II was the 75th season of the Nemzeti Bajnokság II, the second tier of the Hungarian football league.

== League table ==
| Pos | Team | Pld | W | D | L | GF | GA | GD | Pts | Promotion or relegation |
|---|---|---|---|---|---|---|---|---|---|---|
| 1 | Haladás VSE | 34 | 18 | 10 | 6 | 67 | 31 | +36 | 46 | Promotion to Nemzeti Bajnokság I |
| 2 | Dorogi AC | 34 | 18 | 8 | 8 | 57 | 42 | +15 | 44 | Promotion to Nemzeti Bajnokság I |
| 3 | MÁV DAC | 34 | 16 | 11 | 7 | 43 | 29 | +14 | 43 | |
| 4 | Békéscsabai ESSC | 34 | 17 | 7 | 10 | 47 | 37 | +10 | 41 | |
| 5 | Szolnoki MTE | 34 | 17 | 3 | 14 | 53 | 43 | +10 | 37 | |
| 6 | Dunaújvárosi Kohász SE | 34 | 14 | 9 | 11 | 44 | 36 | +8 | 37 | |
| 7 | Kecskeméti SC | 34 | 14 | 7 | 13 | 54 | 45 | +9 | 35 | |
| 8 | Várpalotai Bányász SK | 34 | 15 | 5 | 14 | 39 | 38 | +1 | 35 | |
| 9 | Oroszlányi Bányász SK | 34 | 11 | 11 | 12 | 43 | 39 | +4 | 33 | |
| 10 | Ganz-MÁVAG SE | 34 | 11 | 10 | 13 | 48 | 41 | +7 | 32 | |
| 11 | Pénzügyőr SE | 34 | 11 | 10 | 13 | 37 | 41 | −4 | 32 | |
| 12 | Szekszárdi Dózsa SE | 34 | 9 | 13 | 12 | 39 | 50 | −11 | 31 | |
| 13 | Egri Dózsa | 34 | 9 | 12 | 13 | 36 | 46 | −10 | 30 | |
| 14 | Debreceni VSC | 34 | 10 | 10 | 14 | 31 | 42 | −11 | 30 | |
| 15 | Budapesti Spartacus SC | 34 | 10 | 10 | 14 | 47 | 60 | −13 | 30 | |
| 16 | Volán SC | 34 | 11 | 5 | 18 | 41 | 57 | −16 | 27 | Relegation to Nemzeti Bajnokság III |
| 17 | BKV Előre SC | 34 | 8 | 10 | 16 | 26 | 47 | −21 | 26 | Relegation to Nemzeti Bajnokság III |
| 18 | Miskolci VSC | 34 | 7 | 9 | 18 | 28 | 56 | −28 | 23 | Relegation to Nemzeti Bajnokság III |

== See also ==
- 1972–73 Magyar Kupa
- 1972–73 Nemzeti Bajnokság I
