= Szentendrei Honvéd SE =

Hungarian football club

- Full name: Szentendrei Honvéd SE
- Founded: 1917
- Dissolved: 1994
Home colours

Szentendrei Honvéd SE is a defunct professional football club based in Szentendre, Pest County Hungary.

== History ==
Szentendrei Honvéd SE was established in 1917.

Between 1967 and 1979, László Budai managed the team.

== Name changes ==
- ? – 1959: Szentendrei Honvéd
- 1959 – 1963: Szentendrei Honvéd Szalvai SE
- 1963: merger with Békéscsabai Honvéd
- 1964: reestablished
- 1964 – 1967: Szentendrei Honvéd ETI
- 1967: Honvéd Bajcsy-Zsilinszky SE
- 1967: received the football department of Honvéd ETI SE
- 1967 – 1968: Zalka FSE
- 1968 – 1994: Honvéd Kossuth Lajos Főiskolai SE

== Honours ==
- Nemzeti Bajnokság III
  - Winners (1): 1972–73

== Seasons ==
The table below shows the seasons of Szentendrei Honvéd SE.

Season	Tier	Club's name	Position	Pts
1952	3	Szentendrei Honvéd	4 / 14	35
1953	3	Szentendrei Honvéd	2 / 16	46
1954	3	Szentendrei Honvéd	1 / 16	52
1955	3	Szentendrei Honvéd	7 / 14	28
1956	3	Szentendrei Honvéd	2 / 14	37
1957	3	Szentendrei Honvéd	4 / 11	23
1957–58	3	Szentendrei Honvéd	13 / 18	26
1958–59	4	Szentendrei Honvéd	3 / 16	35
1959–60	4	Honvéd Szalvai SE	1 / 16	51
1960–61	3	Szentendrei Honvéd	3 / 16	36
1961–62	3	Szentendrei Honvéd	2 / 16	37
1962–63	3	Szentendrei Honvéd	13 / 16	25
1964	7	Szentendrei Honvéd ETI	2 / 12	35
1965	7	Szentendrei Honvéd ETI	1 / 11	30
1966	6	Szentendrei Honvéd ETI	10 / 14	22
1967	6	Honvéd Bajcsy-Zsilinszky SE	3 / 14	33
1968	3	Kossuth KFSE	8 / 16	30
1969	3	Kossuth KFSE	3 / 16	38
1970	3	Kossuth KFSE	12 / 16	12
1970–71	3	Kossuth KFSE	10 / 16	30
1971–72	3	Kossuth KFSE	7 / 16	30
1972–73	3	Kossuth KFSE	1 / 16	42
1973–74	2	Kossuth KFSE	8 / 18	33
1974–75	2	Kossuth KFSE	14 / 20	35
1975–76	2	Kossuth KFSE	8 / 20	42
1976–77	2	Kossuth KFSE	13 / 20	33
1977–78	2	Kossuth Katonai FSE	17 / 20	30
1978–79	2	Kossuth KFSE	5 / 19	42
1979–80	2	Kossuth KFSE	8 / 20	38
1980–81	2	Kossuth Katonai FSE	9 / 20	39
1981–82	2	Kossuth KFSE	12 / 16	26
1982–83	3	Kossuth KFSE	6 / 18	34
1983–84	3	Kossuth KFSE	14 / 18	30
1984–85	3	Kossuth KFSE	16 / 18	26
1985–86	6	Kossuth KFSE	6 / 16	35
1986–87	6	Kossuth KFSE	10 / 14	25
1990–91	7	Honvéd Kossuth KFSE	11 / 13	4
1993–94	6	Kossuth KFSE	8 / 10	0
