= 1971–72 Nemzeti Bajnokság I =

Nemzeti Bajnokság I
- Season: 1971–72

Final standings of the 1971–72 Hungarian League season.

== Final standings ==
Pos	Team	Pld	W	D	L	GF	GA	GD	Pts	Qualification or relegation
1	Újpesti Dózsa (C)	30	20	6	4	78	30	+48	46	Qualification for European Cup first round
2	Budapest Honvéd	30	16	7	7	51	26	+25	39	Qualification for UEFA Cup first round
3	Salgótarján	30	15	9	6	51	39	+12	39	Qualification for UEFA Cup first round
4	Tatabányai Bányász	30	13	11	6	44	32	+12	37	
5	Ferencváros (Note: 2 points deducted)	30	14	8	8	59	36	+23	34	Qualification for Cup Winners' Cup first round
6	Vasas	30	12	8	10	51	46	+5	32	
7	Videoton	30	13	5	12	47	43	+4	31	
8	Komlói Bányász	30	10	11	9	38	47	−9	31	
9	Csepel	30	11	8	11	35	38	−3	30	
10	Rába ETO Győr	30	7	12	11	36	51	−15	26	
11	Pécsi Dózsa	30	6	13	11	22	28	−6	25	
12	Diósgyőr	30	9	6	15	32	46	−14	24	
13	MTK Budapest	30	8	8	14	37	41	−4	22	
14	Egyetértés VM	30	5	13	12	26	35	−9	21	
15	Egri Dózsa (R)	30	6	8	16	32	65	−33	20	Relegation to Nemzeti Bajnokság II
16	Haladás (R)	30	4	5	21	27	63	−36	13	Relegation to Nemzeti Bajnokság II

Source: rsssf.com
(C) Champions; (R) Relegated

== Results ==
Home \ Away	CSE	DIÓ	EGR	EGY	FTC	HAL	HON	KOM	MTK	PÉC	GYŐ	SAL	TAT	ÚJP	VAS	VID
Csepel		2–1	1–0	0–0	1–1	1–0	3–1	2–1	0–0	0–1	2–1	0–1	2–1	0–2	3–0	3–1
Diósgyőr	2–1		3–1	0–1	2–2	2–0	0–2	3–1	4–1	1–0	1–0	1–1	1–2	1–1	1–3	1–3
Egri Dózsa	2–2	1–1		0–0	0–1	3–2	0–4	1–1	1–1	1–0	1–1	1–1	2–3	1–3	3–1	2–0
Egyetértés VM	1–1	1–0	0–0		– (Note: The matches Egyetértés VM – Ferencváros and MTK Budapest – Egyetértés VM declared lost for both teams with score 0–0.)	1–1	1–2	3–0	2–0	0–0	1–1	2–1	0–0	1–2	0–3	0–0
Ferencváros	2–2	0–1	6–1	3–1		3–1	4–2	5–0	1–0	2–1	4–0	0–0	2–1	1–2	2–5	6–2
Haladás	1–3	2–0	0–1	1–0	0–2		2–1	2–3	3–0	0–2	3–3	1–1	1–2	2–4	2–2	0–1
Budapest Honvéd	3–0	3–0	3–2	4–0	2–1	4–0		0–0	1–0	2–0	0–1	1–1	1–0	1–0	5–2	1–0
Komlói Bányász	1–0	3–1	4–1	2–2	1–0	2–0	0–0		1–1	1–1	4–1	0–2	1–1	2–1	2–2	1–0
MTK Budapest	3–1	0–0	2–0	–	2–2	6–0	1–4	0–1		1–0	5–0	0–2	0–0	0–1	1–4	1–0
Pécsi Dózsa	3–1	2–0	0–2	1–1	3–1	1–0	0–0	0–0	0–0		0–0	0–0	1–1	1–1	1–2	1–1
Rába ETO Győr	0–0	2–3	3–1	2–2	1–1	2–0	0–0	1–1	2–1	3–3		0–1	1–1	1–3	0–1	2–1
Salgótarján	3–2	3–0	3–0	1–0	1–1	3–0	3–1	5–1	1–3	2–0	0–2		3–2	2–2	1–1	2–1
Tatabányai Bányász	0–0	4–1	2–1	3–2	0–0	1–1	2–1	2–1	2–0	1–0	0–0	4–1		1–0	1–1	4–1
Újpesti Dózsa	4–1	2–1	5–1	3–1	0–2	3–0	1–1	7–1	6–3	0–0	8–1	6–1	2–2		1–0	3–0
Vasas	0–1	0–0	4–2	3–2	0–1	5–2	1–1	1–1	1–4	3–0	1–4	0–1	3–1	0–2		1–0
Videoton	2–0	2–0	8–0	1–1	4–3	1–0	1–0	2–1	1–1	1–0	2–1	7–4	2–0	1–3	1–1	

Source: rsssf.com
Legend: Blue = home team win; Yellow = draw; Red = away team win.

== Statistical leaders ==
=== Top goalscorers ===
Rank	Scorer	Club	Goals
1	(Hungary) Ferenc Bene	Újpesti Dózsa	29
2	(Hungary) László Fazekas	Újpesti Dózsa	21
3	(Hungary) Mihály Kozma	Budapest Honvéd	17
3	(Hungary) Antal Dunai	Újpesti Dózsa	16
4	(Hungary) Flórián Albert	Ferencvárosi TC	15
4	(Hungary) László Branikovits	Ferencvárosi TC	15
6	(Hungary) István Szőke	Ferencvárosi TC	14
6	(Hungary) Béla Várady	Vasas SC	14
8	(Hungary) László Takács	Tatabányai Bányász	13
9	(Hungary) Lajos Kocsis	Budapest Honvéd	12

== Attendances ==
Average home league attendance top 3:

#	Club	Average
1	Ferencváros	11,733
2	Újpest	8,733
3	Egri Dózsa	7,813
