= Pécsi Ércbányász SC =

Hungarian football club

- Full name: Pécsi Ércbányász Sport Club
- Founded: 1956
- Dissolved: 1973
Home colours

Pécsi Ércbányász SC is a defunct professional football club based in Pécs, Hungary.

== History ==
Pécsi Ércbányász SC was funded in 1956 in Pécs as legal successor of Bauxit Bányász SK.

Pécsi Ércbányász SC won the 1970 Nemzeti Bajnokság III season, at that time called Nemzeti Bajnokság II.

On 15 February 1972, Pécsi Építők, Pécsi Bányász SC, Pécsi Dózsa and Pécsi Helyiipar merged as Pécsi MSC.

== Name changes ==
- Pécsi Urán SC: 1956 – 1964
- Pécsi Ércbányász SC: 1964 – 1973.02.15
- On 15 February 1973: Merger with Pécsi Építők, Pécsi Bányász SC, Pécsi Dózsa and Pécsi Helyiipar as Pécsi MSC

== Honours ==
=== League ===
- Nemzeti Bajnokság III:
  - Winners (1): 1970

== Seasons ==
The table below shows the seasons of Pécsi Ércbányász SC.

| Season | Tier | Club's name | Position | Pts |
|---|---|---|---|---|
| 1957 | 4 | Pécsi Urán SC | 9 / 11 | 11 |
| 1957–58 | 5 | Pécsi Urán SC | 2 / 13 | 36 |
| 1958–59 | 5 | Pécsi Urán SC | 4 / 16 | 41 |
| 1959–60 | 4 | Pécsi Urán SC | 12 / 16 | 19 |
| 1960–61 | 4 | Pécsi Urán SC | 10 / 16 | 21 |
| 1961–62 | 4 | Pécsi Urán SC | 4 / 16 | 40 |
| 1962–63 | 4 | Pécsi Urán SC | 2 / 17 | 44 |
| 1963 | 5 | Pécsi Urán SC | 1 / 8 | 23 |
| 1964 | 5 | Pécsi Ércbányász | 1 / 16 | 55 |
| 1965 | 4 | Pécsi Ércbányász | 7 / 16 | 33 |
| 1966 | 4 | Pécsi Ércbányász | 3 / 16 | 41 |
| 1967 | 3 | Pécsi Ércbányász | 11 / 16 | 28 |
| 1968 | 3 | Pécsi Ércbányász | 4 / 16 | 38 |
| 1969 | 3 | Pécsi Ércbányász SE | 4 / 16 | 33 |
| 1970 | 3 | Pécsi Ércbányász | 1 / 16 | 25 |
| 1970–71 | 3 | Pécsi Ércbányász | 3 / 16 | 39 |
| 1971–72 | 3 | Pécsi Ércbányász | 5 / 16 | 32 |
| 1972–73 | 3 | Pécsi Ércbányász | 0 / 16 | |
