= Szekszárdi Dózsa SE =

Hungarian football club

- Full name: Szekszárdi Dózsa Sport Egyesület
- Founded: 1950
- Ground: Szekszárdi Városi Stadion
- Capacity: 7,500
Home colours

Szekszárdi Dózsa Sport Egyesület is a defunct professional football club based in Szekszárd, Tolna County, Hungary.

== History ==
Szekszárdi Dózsa SE won the 1971–72 Nemzeti Bajnokság II season.

== Name changes ==
- Szekszárdi Dózsa: 1950 - 1956
- 1957: merger with Szekszárdi Petőfi SK
- Szekszárdi SC: 1957 - 1958
- 1958: leaving Szekszárdi Petőfi SK
- Szekszárdi Dózsa: 1958 - 1993

== Seasons ==
The highest league that Szekszárdi Dózsa SE have ever played was the third division.

Season	Championship	Tier	Club's name	Position	Pts
1991/1992	Nemzeti Bajnokság II, Nyugati csoport	2	Szekszárdi Dózsa SE	11 / 16	29
1990/1991	Nemzeti Bajnokság II, Nyugati csoport	2	Szekszárdi Dózsa SE	13 / 16	25
1989/1990	Nemzeti Bajnokság II, Nyugati csoport	2	Szekszárdi Dózsa SE	5 / 16	46
1988/1989	Nemzeti Bajnokság II, Nyugati csoport	2	Szekszárdi Dózsa	11 / 16	39
1987/1988	Nemzeti Bajnokság II	2	Szekszárdi Dózsa	20 / 20	22
1986/1987	Nemzeti Bajnokság II	2	Szekszárdi Dózsa	12 / 20	34
1985/1986	Nemzeti Bajnokság II	2	Szekszárdi Dózsa	14 / 20	36
1984/1985	Nemzeti Bajnokság II	2	Szekszárdi Dózsa	14 / 20	33
1983/1984	Nemzeti Bajnokság II	2	Szekszárdi Dózsa SE	17 / 20	33
1982/1983	Nemzeti Bajnokság II	2	Szekszárdi Dózsa SE	15 / 20	36
1981/1982	Nemzeti Bajnokság II, Nyugati csoport	2	Szekszárdi Dózsa SC	3 / 16	41
1980/1981	Nemzeti Bajnokság II, Nyugati csoport	2	Szekszárdi Dózsa SC	12 / 20	36
1979/1980	Nemzeti Bajnokság II, Nyugati csoport	2	Szekszárdi Dózsa SC	6 / 20	42
1978/1979	Nemzeti Bajnokság II, Nyugati csoport	2	Szekszárdi Dózsa	7 / 20	40
1977/1978	Nemzeti Bajnokság II	2	Szekszárdi Dózsa SC	18 / 20	27
1976/1977	Nemzeti Bajnokság II	2	Szekszárdi Dózsa	11 / 20	36
1975/1976	Nemzeti Bajnokság II	2	Szekszárdi Dózsa SC	13 / 20	33
1974/1975	Nemzeti Bajnokság II	2	Szekszárdi Dózsa	10 / 20	39
1973/1974	Nemzeti Bajnokság I/B	2	Szekszárdi Dózsa	10 / 18	32
1972/1973	Nemzeti Bajnokság I/B	2	Szekszárdi Dózsa	12 / 18	31
1971/1972	Nemzeti Bajnokság II, Nyugati csoport	3	Szekszárdi Dózsa	1 / 16	46
1970/1971	Nemzeti Bajnokság II, Nyugati csoport	3	Szekszárdi Dózsa	2 / 16	41
1970 tavasz	Nemzeti Bajnokság II, Nyugati csoport	3	Szekszárdi Dózsa	2 / 16	22
1969	Nemzeti Bajnokság II, Nyugati csoport	3	Szekszárdi Dózsa	6 / 16	30
1968	Nemzeti Bajnokság III, Délnyugati-csoport	4	Szekszárdi Dózsa	1 / 16	45
1967	Nemzeti Bajnokság III, Délnyugati-csoport	4	Szekszárdi Dózsa	3 / 16	38
1966	Nemzeti Bajnokság III, Délnyugati csoport	4	Szekszárdi Dózsa	8 / 16	30
1965	Nemzeti Bajnokság III, Délnyugati csoport	4	Szekszárdi Dózsa	12 / 16	26
1964	Nemzeti Bajnokság III, Délnyugati csoport	4	Szekszárdi Dózsa	6 / 16	32
1963 ősz	Nemzeti Bajnokság III, Délnyugati csoport	4	Szekszárdi Dózsa	9 / 16	13
1962/1963	Nemzeti Bajnokság III, Délnyugati csoport	3	Szekszárdi Dózsa	5 / 16	31
1961/1962	Nemzeti Bajnokság III, Délnyugati-csoport	3	Szekszárdi Dózsa	8 / 16	29
1960/1961	Tolna megye, I. osztály	4	Szekszárdi Dózsa	2 / 16	42
1959/1960	Tolna megye, I. osztály	4	Szekszárdi Dózsa	5 / 16	40
1958/1959	Tolna megye, Szekszárdi járás, Déli csoport	5	Szekszárdi Dózsa	1 / 9	18
1957/1958	Nemzeti Bajnokság II, Nyugati csoport	2	Szekszárdi SC	19 / 19	13
1957 tavasz	Megyei bajnokok tornája, I. csoport	2	Szekszárdi SC	8 / 8	8
1956	Tolna megye, I. osztály	3	Szekszárdi Dózsa	10 / 14	21
1955	Tolna megye, I. osztály	3	Szekszárdi Dózsa	9 / 14	25
1954	Tolna megye	3	Szekszárdi Dózsa	9 / 14	21
1953	Tolna megye	3	Szekszárdi Dózsa	2 / 14	40
1952	Tolna megye	3	Szekszárdi Dózsa	1 / 14	41
1951	Tolna megye, Járási A, Tolnai csoport	4	Szekszárdi Dózsa	1 / 7	12
1951	Tolna megye, Sárközi csoport - Alapszakasz	4	Szekszárdi Dózsa	0 / 10	
