= Debreceni MTE =

Hungarian football club

- Full name: Debreceni Munkás Testedző Egyesület
- Founded: 1910
- Dissolved: 1991
- Ground: Oláh Gábor utcai Stadion
Home colours

Debreceni Munkás Testedző Egyesület is a defunct professional football club based in Debrecen, Hajdú–Bihar County, Hungary.

== History ==
Soccer in Debrecen hit rock bottom in the late 1960s, when the city wasn't represented by a single team in the top two divisions. In 1968, DVSC faced off against MGM Vasas and Debreceni Elektromoss in the third division in what were considered local derbies. Perhaps the term “derby” doesn't really apply to these matches. Then Loki returned to the second division—known at the time as NBI/B—and struggled there for a long time to reach the top flight. In the 1970s, it unexpectedly gained a local rival when the local party committee forced the clubs—composed of workers from the Rolling Bearing Factory, the Construction Company, and the Electric Works—to merge. DMTE, formed from MGM Vasas, the Construction Workers’ Club, and the Electrical Workers’ Club, set a goal of reaching the NB I within 10 years. It planned to do so sooner than DVSC, which had been absent from that division since 1964.

Debreceni MTE finished in the second position in the north-eastern group of the 1974–75 Nemzeti Bajnokság III season. Although the club finished in the 9th position of the 1977–78 Nemzeti Bajnokság III season, DMTE gained promotion to the second division.

== Name changes ==
- Debreceni Munkás Testedző Egyesület: 1910 – 1948
- 1921: Debreceni Nyomdászok SC joined Debreceni MTE
- 1948: merger with Debreceni KASE
- Debreceni Dolgozók Sportegyesülete: 1948 – 1949
- Debreceni Szabadság Munkás Testedző Egyesület: 1949 – 1950
- 1950: dissolved; the rights were transferred to Debreceni Honvéd
- 1957: reestablished
- Debreceni Munkás Testedző Egyesület: 1957 – 1958
- 1958: dissolved
- 1973: merger with MGM Debrecen, Debreceni Építők and Titász Elektromos as DMTE
- Debreceni Munkás Testedző Egyesület: 1973 – 1979
- 1979: merger with Debreceni VSC
- 1989: DMVSC split
- 1989: the club receives the license to play in the second division from Debreceni USE
- Debreceni Munkás Testedző Egyesület: 1989 – 1991
- 1991: dissolved

== Honours ==
- Nemzeti Bajnokság III:
  - Winners (1): 1957–58

== Seasons ==
The table below shows Debreceni Munkás Testedző Egyesület's seasons.

Season	Tier	Club's name	Position	Pts
1911–12	2	Debreceni MTE	5 / 7	9
1912–13	2	Debreceni MTE	7 / 9	
1922–23	2	Debreceni MTE	9 / 9	0
1923–24	3	Debreceni MTE	1 / 4	
1924–25	3	Debreceni MTE	1 / 6	
1925–26	3	Debreceni MTE	1 / 5	15
1926–27	3	Debreceni MTE	1 / 5	4
1927–28	2	Debreceni MTE	8 / 10	10
1928–29	2	Debreceni MTE	11 / 11	8
1929–30	2	Debreceni MTE	10 / 11	3
1930–31	2	Debreceni MTE	10 / 14	19
1931–32	2	Debreceni MTE	7 / 12	19
1932–33	2	Debreceni MTE	10 / 13	18
1933–34	3	Debreceni MTE	1 / 11	28
1934–35	2	Debreceni MTE	12 / 13	14
1935–36	3	Debreceni MTE	2 / 7	18
1936–37	3	Debreceni MTE	4 / 8	17
1937–38	3	Debreceni MTE	2 / 9	24
1938–39	3	Debreceni MTE	11 / 13	13
1939–40	3	Debreceni MTE	2 / 11	33
1940–41	4	Debreceni MTE	9 / 10	5
1941–42	4	Debreceni MTE	9 / 11	10
1942–43	4	Debreceni MTE	6 / 12	
1943–44	4	Debreceni MTE	1 / 12	40
1944–45	2	Debreceni MTE	7 / 13	-
1944–45	3	Debreceni MTE	0 / 10	
1945	2	Debreceni MTE	0 / 6	
1945–46	2	Debreceni MTE	4 / 12	29
1946–47	3	Debreceni MTE	8 / 11	17
1946–47	2	Debreceni MTE	14 / 14	3
1947–48	3	Debreceni MTE	5 / 13	29
1948–49	2	Debreceni SzMTE (Debreceni DSE)	14 / 16	21
1957	4	Debreceni MTE	3 / 6	13
1957–58	4	Debreceni Munkás TE	14 / 17	22
1973–74	3	Debreceni MTE	11 / 16	26
1974–75	3	Debreceni MTE	2 / 20	49
1975–76	3	Debreceni MTE	3 / 20	48
1976–77	3	Debreceni MTE	2 / 20	53
1977–78	3	Debreceni MTE	9 / 20	42
1978–79	2	Debreceni MTE	7 / 20	43
1989–90	2	Debreceni MTE	8 / 16	39
1990–91	2	Debreceni MTE	11 / 16	25
