= Pécsi Bányász SC =

Hungarian football club

- Full name: Pécsi Bányász Sport Club
- Founded: 1922
Home colours	Away colours

Pécsi Bányász Sport Club was a football club from the town of Pécs, Hungary.

== History ==
Pécsi Bányász won the 1970 Nemzeti Bajnokság II season. Despite its second league title, the club was not promoted to the first tier since lost the promotion playoff against FŐSPED Szállítók.

== Name changes ==
- Pécsi Duna Gőzhajózási Társaság Villamostelepi Atlétikai Club: 1922 – 1943
- Déldunántúli Villamos Atlétikai Club: 1943 – 1947
- Pécsi Dinamó Villamostelepi AC: 1946 – 1947
- Pécsi MESzHART Dinamó: 1947 – 1951
- Pécsújhegyi Bányász: 1951 – 1954
- Pécsi Bányász: 1954 – 1955
- Pécsújhegyi Bányász: 1955 – 1956
- Pécsi DVAC: 1956 – 1957
- Pécsújhegyi Bányász: 1957 – 1958
- Pécsi Bányász SK: 1958 – 28 November 1968
- Mecseki Szénbányák Pécsi Bányász Sportköre: 28 November 1968 – 1973

== Honours ==
=== League ===
- Nemzeti Bajnokság II:
  - Winners (1): 1970
  - Runners-up (2): 1946–47, 1950
  - Third place (2): 1944–45, 1954
