= Sabaria SE =

Hungarian football club

- Full name: Sabaria SE
- Founded: 1957
- Dissolved: 1993
Home colours

Sabaria SE is a defunct professional football club based in Szombathely, Vas County, Hungary.

== History ==
Sabaria SE rose to prominence around the turn of the 1970s and 1980s. The team—which wore red, white, and blue—had essentially nothing to do with the Sabaria FC of fifty years earlier. That is to say, it was, in a sense: Sabaria SE was formed in 1975 through the merger of Szombathelyi SE Dózsa (from which the later SzAK split off even before World War I) and Savaria Cipőgyár SE, and it hosted its opponents partly at the Városliget Sports Complex until its dissolution in 1993.

Sabaria won the Bakony group of the 1989–90 Nemzeti Bajnokság III and were promoted to the second division. The team spent three consecutive years in the second division, as Sabaria-Tipo SE. Finally, in the 1992–93 Nemzeti Bajnokság II, Sabaria finished in the eight position. However, this position did not mean relegation the club dissolved.

== Name changes ==
- Szombathelyi Cipőgyár: ? – 1969
- Savaria Cipőgyár SE: 1969 – 1975
- 1975: merger with Szombathelyi SE Dózsa
- Sabaria SE: 1975 – 1990
- Sabaria Tipo SE: 1990 – 1993

== Honours ==
- Nemzeti Bajnokság III:
  - Winners (1): 1989–90

== Seasons ==
The highest league that Sabaria SE have ever played was the second tier.

| Season | Tier | Club's name | Position | Pts |
|---|---|---|---|---|
| 1992–93 | 2 | Sabaria-Tipo SE | 8 / 16 | 33 |
| 1991–92 | 2 | Sabaria-Tipo SE | 5 / 16 | 34 |
| 1990–91 | 2 | Sabaria-Tipo SE | 10 / 16 | 26 |
| 1989–90 | 3 | Sabaria SE | 1 / 16 | 69 |
| 1988–89 | 3 | Sabaria SE | 3 / 16 | 60 |
| 1987–88 | 3 | Sabaria SE | 9 / 18 | 33 |
| 1986–87 | 3 | Sabaria SE | 7 / 18 | 39 |
| 1985–86 | 3 | Sabaria SE | 8 / 18 | 34 |
| 1984–85 | 3 | Sabaria SE | 2 / 18 | 53 |
| 1983–84 | 3 | Sabaria SE | 2 / 18 | 49 |
| 1982–83 | 3 | Sabaria SE | 4 / 18 | 37 |
| 1981–82 | 2 | Sabaria SE | 8 / 16 | 33 |
| 1980–81 | 2 | Sabaria SE | 4 / 20 | 47 |
| 1979–80 | 2 | Sabaria SE | 7 / 20 | 42 |
| 1978–79 | 2 | Sabaria SE | 6 / 20 | 40 |
| 1977–78 | 3 | Sabaria SE | 14 / 20 | 38 |
| 1976–77 | 3 | Sabaria SE | 4 / 20 | 47 |
| 1975–76 | 3 | Sabaria SE | 14 / 19 | 33 |
| 1974–75 | 3 | Sabaria SE | 4 / 20 | 41 |
| 1973–74 | 3 | Sabaria Cipőgyár | 12 / 16 | 28 |
| 1972–73 | 3 | Sabaria Cipőgyár | 10 / 16 | 24 |
| 1971–72 | 3 | Savaria Cipőgyár | 4 / 16 | 34 |
| 1970–71 | 3 | Savaria Cipőgyár | 7 / 16 | 32 |
| 1970 tavasz | 3 | Savaria Cipőgyár | 15 / 16 | 10 |
| 1969 | 3 | Savaria Cipőgyár | 2 / 16 | 41 |
| 1968 | 3 | Szombathelyi Cipőgyár | 11 / 16 | 27 |
| 1967 | 3 | Szombathelyi Cipőgyár | 5 / 16 | 33 |
| 1966 | 4 | Szombathelyi Cipőgyár | 3 / 16 | 40 |
| 1965 | 4 | Szombathelyi Cipőgyár | 6 / 16 | 33 |
| 1964 | 4 | Szombathelyi Cipőgyár | 7 / 17 | 29 |
| 1963 ősz | 4 | Szombathelyi Cipőgyár | 9 / 16 | 15 |
| 1962–63 | 3 | Szombathelyi Cipőgyár | 7 / 16 | 28 |
| 1961–62 | 3 | Szombathelyi Cipőgyár | 9 / 16 | 29 |
| 1960–61 | 3 | Szombathelyi Cipőgyár | 12 / 16 | 25 |
| 1959–60 | 3 | Szombathelyi Cipőgyári SE | 5 / 17 | 35 |
| 1958–59 | 4 | Szombathelyi Cipőgyár | 1 / 16 | 50 |
| 1957–58 | 4 | Szombathelyi Cipőgyár | 1 / 16 | 52 |
