= Vörös Meteor Egyetértés SK =

Hungarian football club

- Full name: Vörös Meteor Egyetértés Sport Klub
- Founded: 1907
- Dissolved: 1975
- Ground: Szőnyi úti Stadion
Home colours	Away colours

Vörös Meteor Egyetértés SK was a Hungarian football club from Budapest.

== History ==
Vörös Meteor Egyetértés SK debuted in the 1921–22 season of the Hungarian League and finished twelfths.

== Name Changes ==
- 1907–?: Egyetértés Sport Club
- ?–1940: Egyetértés AC
- ? – 1940
- 1945–1951: Egyetértés Sport Club
- 1951–1952: Vörös Meteor Egyetértés SK
- 1952: merger with Vörös Meteor Nemzeti Bank SK
- 1953: reestablished
- 1953–1956: Vörös Meteor Vendéglátóipari SC
- 1956–1971: Egyetértés Sport Club
- 1972–1975: Vörös Meteor Egyetértés Sport Klub
- 1975: merger with MTK Budapest FC

== Honours ==
- Nemzeti Bajnokság II
  - Winners (4): 1954, 1963, 1967, 1970–71

== Seasons ==
The table below shows the seasons of Vörös Meteor Egyetértés SK.

Season	Tier	Club's name	Position	Pts
1908–09	3	Egyetértés SC	7 / 10	18
1909–10	3	Egyetértés SC	4 / 10	25
1919–20	3	Egyetértés SC	14 / 15	2
1925–26	4	Egyetértés SC	2 / 14	41
1926–27	3	Egyetértés SC	2 / 16	48
1927–28	3	Egyetértés SC	4 / 17	40
1928–29	3	Egyetértés SC	9 / 16	30
1929–30	3	Egyetértés SC	11 / 15	23
1930–31	3	Egyetértés SC	13 / 14	10
1931–32	3	Egyetértés SC	14 / 14	11
1945	2	Vendéglátóip. Munkások SC	8 / 12	15
1945–46	2	Egyetértés SC	12 / 14	5
1946–47	4	Egyetértés SC	9 / 14	23
1947–48	4	Egyetértés SC	1 / 15	45
1948–49	4	Egyetértés SC	6 / 15	26
1949–50	4	Egyetértés SC	10 / 16	27
1950	4	Egyetértés SC	9 / 16	17
1951	3	Vörös Meteor Egyetértés	7 / 12	21
1955	3	Vörös Meteor Vendéglátó	6 / 16	30
1956	3	Vörös Meteor Vendéglátó	1 / 16	47
1957	2	Egyetértés SC	5 / 6	5
1957–58	2	Egyetértés SC	10 / 19	37
1958–59	2	Egyetértés SC	7 / 16	31
1959–60	2	VM Egyetértés	4 / 16	34
1960–61	2	VM Egyetértés	8 / 16	29
1961–62	2	VM Egyetértés	6 / 16	34
1962–63	2	VM Egyetértés	5 / 16	31
1963	2	VM Egyetértés	1 / 16	23
1964	2	VM Egyetértés	12 / 16	28
1965	2	VM Egyetértés	4 / 16	38
1966	2	VM Egyetértés	12 / 16	27
1967	2	Egyetértés SC	1 / 18	46
1968	1	Egyetértés SC	9 / 16	26
1969	1	Egyetértés SC	15 / 16	21
1970	2	Egyetértés SC	2 / 9	20
1970–71	2	Vörös Meteor Egyetértés SK	1 / 18	57
1971–72	1	Vörös Meteor Egyetértés SK	14 / 16	21
1972–73	1	Vörös Meteor Egyetértés SK	13 / 16	24
1973–74	1	Vörös Meteor Egyetértés SK	14 / 16	23
1974–75	1	Vörös Meteor Egyetértés SK	0 / 16	

== Managers ==
- (Hungary) Károly Lakat
