= 1989–90 Nemzeti Bajnokság II =

Nemzeti Bajnokság II
- Season: 1989–90
- Champions: Volán FC (West); Szeged SC (East)
- Promoted: Volán FC (West); Szeged SC (East)
- Relegated: Keszthelyi Haladás SE (West); Tapolcai Bauxitbányász (West); Paksi SE (West); Debreceni Kinizsi SE (East); Mezőtúri Honvéd SE (East); Szegedi Dózsa SE (East)

The 1989–90 Nemzeti Bajnokság II was the 92nd season of the Nemzeti Bajnokság II, the second tier of the Hungarian football league.

== League table ==
=== Western group ===
Pos	Team	Pld	W	D	L	GF	GA	GD	Pts	Promotion or relegation
1	Volán SC	30	19	8	3	65	25	+40	65	Promotion to Nemzeti Bajnokság I
2	Dunaferr SE	30	17	6	7	49	34	+15	57	
3	Oroszlányi Bányász SK	30	16	7	7	44	27	+17	55	
4	Zalaegerszegi TE	30	15	5	10	52	40	+12	50	
5	Szekszárdi Dózsa SE	30	13	7	10	41	31	+10	46	
6	Komlói Bányász SK	30	11	11	8	33	31	+2	44	
7	Soproni SE	30	13	4	13	48	44	+4	43	
8	III. Kerületi TTVE	30	10	12	8	31	24	+7	42	
9	Dorogi Bányász SC	30	10	11	9	38	33	+5	41	
10	Mohácsi Új Barázda TSZ SE	30	12	5	13	37	38	−1	41	
11	Nagykanizsai Olajbányász SE	30	10	8	12	39	45	−6	38	
12	Ajkai Hungalu SK	30	7	12	11	32	32	0	33	
13	Budafoki MTE-Törley	30	8	8	14	26	48	−22	32	
14	Keszthelyi ATE Haladás SC	30	5	12	13	26	43	−17	27	Relegation to Nemzeti Bajnokság III
15	Tapolcai Bauxitbányász SE	30	5	7	18	24	59	−35	22	Relegation to Nemzeti Bajnokság III
16	Paksi SE	30	3	9	18	28	59	−31	18	Relegation to Nemzeti Bajnokság III

=== Eastern group ===
Pos	Team	Pld	W	D	L	GF	GA	GD	Pts	Promotion or relegation
1	Szeged SC	30	18	7	5	52	24	+28	61	Promotion to Nemzeti Bajnokság I
2	Kazincbarcikai Vegyész SE	30	15	7	8	41	30	+11	52	
3	Budapesti VSC	30	13	9	8	38	30	+8	48	
4	Eger SE	30	14	5	11	45	41	+4	47	
5	Diósgyőri VTK	30	12	10	8	43	35	+8	46	
6	Nyíregyházi VSSC	30	12	7	11	30	27	+3	43	
7	Szarvasi Vasas Spartacus SE	30	11	10	9	36	34	+2	43	
8	Debreceni MTE	30	9	12	9	40	36	+4	39	
9	Salgótarjáni Síküveg SE	30	10	9	11	43	42	+1	39	
10	Kecskeméti SC	30	10	9	11	36	39	−3	39	
11	Szolnoki MÁV MTE	30	10	9	11	39	46	−7	39	
12	Metripond SE	30	10	8	12	42	37	+5	38	
13	Bajai SK	30	10	8	12	33	38	−5	38	
14	Debreceni Kinizsi SE	30	9	10	11	34	35	−1	37	Relegation
15	Mezőtúri Honvéd SE	30	5	10	15	20	42	−22	25	Relegation
16	Szegedi Dózsa SE	30	3	8	19	23	59	−36	17	Relegation

== See also ==
- 1989–90 Magyar Kupa
- 1989–90 Nemzeti Bajnokság I
