= 1987–88 Nemzeti Bajnokság II =

Nemzeti Bajnokság II
- Season: 1987–88
- Champions: FC Veszprém
- Promoted: FC Veszprém (winners); Dunaújváros FC (1952) (runners-up)
- Relegated: FC Ajka; Salgótarjáni BTC; Szekszárdi UFC

The 1987–88 Nemzeti Bajnokság II was the 90th season of the Nemzeti Bajnokság II, the second tier of the Hungarian football league.

== League table ==
| Pos | Team | Pld | W | D | L | GF | GA | GD | Pts | Promotion or relegation |
|---|---|---|---|---|---|---|---|---|---|---|
| 1 | Veszprém SE | 38 | 21 | 7 | 10 | 49 | 28 | +21 | 49 | Promotion to Nemzeti Bajnokság I |
| 2 | Dunaújvárosi Kohász | 38 | 18 | 12 | 8 | 62 | 38 | +24 | 48 | Promotion to Nemzeti Bajnokság I |
| 3 | Szeged SC | 38 | 16 | 13 | 9 | 58 | 35 | +23 | 45 | |
| 4 | Szolnoki MÁV MTE | 38 | 19 | 6 | 13 | 61 | 52 | +9 | 44 | |
| 5 | Ózdi Kohász | 38 | 14 | 15 | 9 | 42 | 35 | +7 | 43 | |
| 6 | Komlói Bányász SK | 38 | 16 | 10 | 12 | 54 | 42 | +12 | 42 | |
| 7 | Volán SC | 38 | 16 | 9 | 13 | 61 | 51 | +10 | 41 | |
| 8 | Csepel SC | 38 | 17 | 7 | 14 | 54 | 54 | 0 | 41 | |
| 9 | Metripond SE | 38 | 15 | 11 | 12 | 52 | 52 | 0 | 41 | |
| 10 | Nyíregyházi VSSC | 38 | 15 | 9 | 14 | 50 | 51 | −1 | 39 | |
| 11 | Diósgyőri VTK | 38 | 16 | 6 | 16 | 43 | 52 | −9 | 38 | |
| 12 | Kecskeméti SC | 38 | 16 | 5 | 17 | 63 | 63 | 0 | 37 | |
| 13 | Eger SE | 38 | 12 | 13 | 13 | 44 | 54 | −10 | 37 | |
| 14 | Nagykanizsai Olajbányász SE | 38 | 12 | 10 | 16 | 47 | 52 | −5 | 34 | |
| 15 | III. Kerületi TTVE | 38 | 10 | 14 | 14 | 44 | 58 | −14 | 34 | |
| 16 | Építők SC | 38 | 13 | 7 | 18 | 48 | 53 | −5 | 33 | |
| 17 | Kazincbarcikai Vegyész SE | 38 | 10 | 12 | 16 | 37 | 45 | −8 | 32 | |
| 18 | Ajkai Hungalu SC | 38 | 9 | 13 | 16 | 33 | 48 | −15 | 31 | Relegation to Nemzeti Bajnokság III |
| 19 | Salgótarjáni BTC | 38 | 9 | 11 | 18 | 40 | 51 | −11 | 29 | Relegation to Nemzeti Bajnokság III |
| 20 | Szekszárdi Dózsa | 38 | 7 | 8 | 23 | 34 | 62 | −28 | 22 | Relegation to Nemzeti Bajnokság III |

== See also ==
- 1987–88 Magyar Kupa
- 1987–88 Nemzeti Bajnokság I
- 1987–88 Nemzeti Bajnokság III
