= 1987–88 Nemzeti Bajnokság III =

Nemzeti Bajnokság III
- Season: 1987–88
- Champions: Soproni SE (Bakony); Mohácsi Új Barázda TSZ SE (Dráva); Oroszlányi Bányász SK (Duna); Szarvasi Vasas (Kőrös); Hatvan KVSC (Mátra); Jászberényi Lehel SE (Tisza)
- Promoted: Soproni SE (Bakony); Tapolca Bauxitbányász SE (Bakony); Keszthelyi Haladás SC (Bakony); Mohácsi Új Barázda TSZ SE (Dráva); Csurgói Spartacus (Dráva); Oroszlányi Bányász SK (Duna); Dorogi Bányász SC (Duna); Szarvasi Vasas (Kőrös); Bajai SK (Kőrös); Hatvan KVSC (Mátra); Budapesti VSC (Mátra); Jászberényi Lehel SE (Tisza); Debreceni Universitas SE (Tisza); Debreceni Kinizsi SE (Tisza)

The 1987–88 Nemzeti Bajnokság III season was the 6th edition of the Nemzeti Bajnokság III.

== League tables ==
=== Bakony group ===
| Pos | Teams | Pld | W | D | L | GF | GA | GD | Pts | Promotion or relegation |
|---|---|---|---|---|---|---|---|---|---|---|
| 1 | Soproni SE | 34 | 25 | 6 | 3 | 82 | 26 | 56 | 56 | Promotion to Nemzeti Bajnokság II |
| 2 | Tapolcai Bauxitbányász SE | 34 | 22 | 9 | 3 | 60 | 16 | 44 | 53 | Promotion to Nemzeti Bajnokság II |
| 3 | Keszthelyi Haladás SC | 34 | 23 | 6 | 5 | 79 | 22 | 57 | 52 | Promotion to Nemzeti Bajnokság II |
| 4 | Ajkai Bányász | 34 | 14 | 13 | 7 | 46 | 40 | 6 | 41 | |
| 5 | MÁV DAC | 34 | 14 | 12 | 8 | 64 | 38 | 26 | 40 | |
| 6 | Honvéd Katona József SE | 34 | 16 | 7 | 11 | 56 | 41 | 15 | 39 | |
| 7 | MOTIM TE | 34 | 15 | 8 | 11 | 50 | 43 | 7 | 38 | |
| 8 | Sárvári Kinizsi | 34 | 12 | 9 | 13 | 62 | 63 | -1 | 33 | |
| 9 | Sabaria SE | 34 | 11 | 11 | 12 | 40 | 48 | -8 | 33 | |
| 10 | Peremartoni SC | 34 | 12 | 7 | 15 | 54 | 57 | -3 | 31 | |
| 11 | Péti MTE | 34 | 11 | 8 | 15 | 50 | 45 | 5 | 30 | |
| 12 | Szentgotthárdi MSE | 34 | 10 | 8 | 16 | 37 | 62 | -25 | 28 | |
| 13 | Pápai SE | 34 | 11 | 6 | 17 | 35 | 63 | -28 | 28 | |
| 14 | Petőházi Cukorgyári SE | 34 | 8 | 11 | 15 | 42 | 53 | -11 | 27 | |
| 15 | Répcelaki Bányász | 34 | 8 | 10 | 16 | 37 | 49 | -12 | 26 | |
| 16 | Zala Volán MTE | 34 | 8 | 9 | 17 | 43 | 59 | -16 | 25 | |
| 17 | Soproni Postás | 34 | 11 | 3 | 20 | 39 | 74 | -35 | 25 | Relegation to Megyei Bajnokság I |
| 18 | LATEX Kőszegi SE | 34 | 1 | 5 | 28 | 25 | 102 | -77 | 7 | Relegation to Megyei Bajnokság I |

=== Dráva group ===
| Pos | Teams | Pld | W | D | L | GF | GA | GD | Pts | Promotion or relegation |
|---|---|---|---|---|---|---|---|---|---|---|
| 1 | Mohácsi Új Barázda TSZ SE | 30 | 19 | 6 | 5 | 62 | 18 | 44 | 44 | Promotion to Nemzeti Bajnokság II |
| 2 | Csurgói Spartacus | 30 | 16 | 9 | 5 | 55 | 27 | 28 | 41 | Promotion to Nemzeti Bajnokság II |
| 3 | Paksi SE | 30 | 15 | 9 | 6 | 43 | 23 | 20 | 39 | |
| 4 | Honvéd Táncsics SE | 30 | 12 | 10 | 8 | 39 | 31 | 8 | 34 | |
| 5 | Paksi Atomerőmű SE | 30 | 13 | 8 | 9 | 36 | 33 | 3 | 34 | |
| 6 | MÁV Nagykanizsai TE | 30 | 9 | 13 | 8 | 25 | 25 | 0 | 31 | |
| 7 | Marcali Városi SE | 30 | 9 | 13 | 8 | 31 | 33 | -2 | 31 | |
| 8 | Dombovári VMSE | 30 | 11 | 8 | 11 | 35 | 34 | 1 | 30 | |
| 9 | Bólyi MEDOSZ SE | 30 | 9 | 9 | 12 | 37 | 37 | 0 | 27 | |
| 10 | Mázaszászvári Bányász | 30 | 10 | 7 | 13 | 44 | 52 | -8 | 27 | |
| 11 | Siklósi Tenkes SE | 30 | 9 | 8 | 13 | 34 | 38 | -4 | 26 | |
| 12 | Dombóvári Vasas | 30 | 9 | 8 | 13 | 37 | 50 | -13 | 26 | |
| 13 | Bonyhádi MSC | 30 | 8 | 8 | 14 | 48 | 51 | -3 | 24 | |
| 14 | Sellyei SK | 30 | 8 | 7 | 15 | 37 | 63 | -26 | 23 | |
| 15 | Pécsi BTC 1 | 30 | 8 | 7 | 15 | 33 | 63 | -30 | 21 | Relegation to Megyei Bajnokság I |
| 16 | Pécsi VSK | 30 | 6 | 8 | 16 | 28 | 46 | -18 | 20 | Relegation to Megyei Bajnokság I |

=== Duna group ===
| Pos | Teams | Pld | W | D | L | GF | GA | GD | Pts | Promotion or relegation |
|---|---|---|---|---|---|---|---|---|---|---|
| 1 | Oroszlányi Bányász SK | 32 | 27 | 3 | 2 | 76 | 23 | 53 | 57 | Promotion to Nemzeti Bajnokság II |
| 2 | Dorogi Bányász SC | 32 | 24 | 3 | 5 | 79 | 19 | 60 | 51 | Promotion to Nemzeti Bajnokság II |
| 3 | Esztergomi Vasas SC | 32 | 19 | 7 | 6 | 64 | 35 | 29 | 45 | |
| 4 | Erzsébeti SMTK | 32 | 18 | 7 | 7 | 61 | 29 | 32 | 43 | |
| 5 | Budafoki MTE | 32 | 17 | 6 | 9 | 51 | 29 | 22 | 40 | |
| 6 | Rákosmenti TK | 32 | 15 | 6 | 11 | 67 | 47 | 20 | 36 | |
| 7 | Várpalotai Bányász SK | 32 | 13 | 7 | 12 | 55 | 54 | 1 | 33 | |
| 8 | Duna Kőolaj SK | 32 | 11 | 10 | 11 | 43 | 46 | -3 | 32 | |
| 9 | Pénzügyőr SE | 32 | 10 | 11 | 11 | 34 | 44 | -10 | 31 | |
| 10 | BKV Előre SC | 32 | 10 | 8 | 14 | 50 | 53 | -3 | 28 | |
| 11 | Ráckeve SE | 32 | 11 | 5 | 16 | 52 | 69 | -17 | 27 | |
| 12 | Érdi VSE | 32 | 8 | 9 | 15 | 37 | 54 | -17 | 25 | |
| 13 | Honvéd Osztapenko SE | 32 | 9 | 6 | 17 | 54 | 63 | -9 | 24 | |
| 14 | Dunakeszi Vasutas SE | 32 | 7 | 8 | 17 | 29 | 41 | -12 | 22 | |
| 15 | Sárisápi Bányász SE | 32 | 8 | 6 | 18 | 33 | 67 | -34 | 22 | |
| 16 | Kartali MEDOSZ SE | 32 | 7 | 7 | 18 | 42 | 72 | -30 | 21 | |
| 17 | Székesfehérvári MÁV Előre SC | 32 | 2 | 3 | 27 | 31 | 113 | -82 | 7 | Relegation to Megyei Bajnokság I |
| - | Budapesti Építők SC 1 | 0 | 0 | 0 | 0 | 0 | 0 | 0 | 0 | Relegation to Megyei Bajnokság I |

=== Kőrös group ===
| Pos | Teams | Pld | W | D | L | GF | GA | GD | Pts | Promotion or relegation |
|---|---|---|---|---|---|---|---|---|---|---|
| 1 | Szarvasi Vasas | 30 | 25 | 4 | 1 | 68 | 21 | 47 | 54 | Promotion to Nemzeti Bajnokság II |
| 2 | Bajai SK | 30 | 19 | 8 | 3 | 71 | 26 | 45 | 46 | Promotion to Nemzeti Bajnokság II |
| 3 | Miskei TSZ SK | 30 | 19 | 5 | 6 | 65 | 26 | 39 | 43 | |
| 4 | Honvéd Szabó Lajos SE | 30 | 15 | 6 | 9 | 42 | 41 | 1 | 36 | |
| 5 | Gyulai SE | 30 | 14 | 7 | 9 | 52 | 40 | 12 | 35 | |
| 6 | Szegedi Dózsa SC | 30 | 12 | 10 | 8 | 52 | 40 | 12 | 34 | |
| 7 | Orosházi MTK | 30 | 13 | 7 | 10 | 57 | 49 | 8 | 33 | |
| 8 | Csongrádi SC | 30 | 12 | 7 | 11 | 43 | 38 | 5 | 31 | |
| 9 | Honvéd Kun Béla SE | 30 | 11 | 6 | 13 | 39 | 46 | -7 | 28 | |
| 10 | Kecskeméti TE | 30 | 12 | 3 | 15 | 45 | 47 | -2 | 27 | |
| 11 | Szentesi Vízmű SK | 30 | 7 | 9 | 14 | 24 | 38 | -14 | 23 | |
| 12 | Mezőkovácsházi TE | 30 | 5 | 12 | 13 | 35 | 46 | -11 | 22 | |
| 13 | Soltvadkerti TE | 30 | 5 | 11 | 14 | 34 | 53 | -19 | 21 | |
| 14 | Békési SE | 30 | 7 | 6 | 17 | 23 | 52 | -29 | 20 | |
| 15 | Kalocsai SE | 30 | 7 | 4 | 19 | 24 | 49 | -25 | 18 | Relegation to Megyei Bajnokság I |
| 16 | Tisza Cipő SE | 30 | 1 | 7 | 22 | 18 | 80 | -62 | 9 | Relegation to Megyei Bajnokság I |

=== Mátra group ===
| Pos | Teams | Pld | W | D | L | GF | GA | GD | Pts | Promotion or relegation |
|---|---|---|---|---|---|---|---|---|---|---|
| 1 | Hatvan KVSC | 30 | 16 | 11 | 3 | 60 | 31 | 29 | 43 | Promotion to Nemzeti Bajnokság II |
| 2 | Budapesti VSC | 30 | 17 | 6 | 7 | 55 | 32 | 23 | 40 | Promotion to Nemzeti Bajnokság II |
| 3 | Gyöngyösi SE | 30 | 12 | 13 | 5 | 35 | 22 | 13 | 37 | |
| 4 | Honvéd Köteles Jenő SE | 30 | 12 | 11 | 7 | 43 | 36 | 7 | 35 | |
| 5 | Bélapátfalvai Építők | 30 | 14 | 6 | 10 | 57 | 47 | 10 | 34 | |
| 6 | Borsodi Bányász | 30 | 11 | 12 | 7 | 36 | 28 | 8 | 34 | |
| 7 | Romhányi Kerámia | 30 | 10 | 12 | 8 | 38 | 39 | -1 | 32 | |
| 8 | Mádi Ércbányász | 30 | 9 | 12 | 9 | 37 | 30 | 7 | 30 | |
| 9 | Salgótarjáni Síküveggyár | 30 | 10 | 10 | 10 | 53 | 53 | 0 | 30 | |
| 10 | Recski Ércbányász | 30 | 9 | 9 | 12 | 40 | 49 | -9 | 27 | |
| 11 | Edelényi Bányász | 30 | 9 | 8 | 13 | 50 | 52 | -2 | 26 | |
| 12 | Nagybátonyi Bányász SC | 30 | 6 | 14 | 10 | 30 | 37 | -7 | 26 | |
| 13 | Balassagyarmati HVSE | 30 | 8 | 10 | 12 | 38 | 47 | -9 | 26 | |
| 14 | Hevesi SE | 30 | 7 | 9 | 14 | 29 | 54 | -25 | 23 | |
| 15 | Honvéd Papp József SE | 30 | 5 | 12 | 13 | 26 | 42 | -16 | 22 | Relegation to Megyei Bajnokság I |
| 16 | Sajóbábonyi Vegyész | 30 | 5 | 5 | 20 | 29 | 57 | -28 | 15 | Relegation to Megyei Bajnokság I |

=== Tisza group ===
| Pos | Teams | Pld | W | D | L | GF | GA | GD | Pts | Promotion or relegation |
|---|---|---|---|---|---|---|---|---|---|---|
| 1 | Jászberényi Lehel SE | 30 | 18 | 8 | 4 | 48 | 21 | 27 | 44 | Promotion to Nemzeti Bajnokság II |
| 2 | Debreceni Universitas SE | 30 | 18 | 8 | 4 | 56 | 32 | 24 | 44 | Promotion to Nemzeti Bajnokság II |
| 3 | Debreceni Kinizsi SE | 30 | 17 | 9 | 4 | 65 | 34 | 31 | 43 | Promotion to Nemzeti Bajnokság II |
| 4 | Hajdúböszörményi Bocskai SE | 30 | 16 | 7 | 7 | 48 | 30 | 18 | 39 | |
| 5 | Olefin SC | 30 | 14 | 10 | 6 | 58 | 40 | 18 | 38 | |
| 6 | Rakamazi Spartacus SE | 30 | 14 | 7 | 9 | 69 | 38 | 31 | 35 | |
| 7 | Kabai Egyetértés SE | 30 | 11 | 9 | 10 | 36 | 33 | 3 | 31 | |
| 8 | Balmazújvárosi Lenin TSz SE | 30 | 8 | 13 | 9 | 35 | 42 | -7 | 29 | |
| 9 | Kisvárdai SE | 30 | 11 | 6 | 13 | 41 | 38 | 3 | 28 | |
| 10 | Volán Rákóczi SE | 30 | 11 | 5 | 14 | 55 | 42 | 13 | 27 | |
| 11 | Törökszentmiklósi SE | 30 | 10 | 6 | 14 | 34 | 44 | -10 | 26 | |
| 12 | Honvéd Asztalos János SE | 30 | 9 | 7 | 14 | 37 | 55 | -18 | 25 | |
| 13 | Szeghalmi SC | 30 | 8 | 8 | 14 | 49 | 59 | -10 | 24 | |
| 14 | Berettyóújfalui SE | 30 | 4 | 10 | 16 | 36 | 64 | -28 | 18 | |
| 15 | Püspökladányi MÁV | 30 | 6 | 5 | 19 | 24 | 58 | -34 | 17 | Relegation to Megyei Bajnokság I |
| 16 | Karcagi SE | 30 | 3 | 6 | 21 | 17 | 78 | -61 | 12 | Relegation to Megyei Bajnokság I |

== Promotion playoffs ==
Group A

| | | Pld | W | D | L | GF | GA | Pts | Promotion |
|---|---|---|---|---|---|---|---|---|---|
| 1. | Debreceni Kinizsi SE | 4 | 2 | 2 | 0 | 6 | 2 | 6 | Promotion to Nemzeti Bajnokság II |
| 2. | Salgótarjáni BTC | 4 | 1 | 2 | 1 | 5 | 4 | 4 | |
| 3. | Gyöngyösi SE | 4 | 0 | 2 | 2 | 3 | 8 | 2 | |

Group B

1. Szekszárdi Dózsa 4 3 – 1 15-4 6

------------------------------------------

2. Esztergomi SZIM Vasas 4 2 – 2 12-10 4

3. Miskei TSZ 4 1 – 3 4-17 2

Group C

1. Keszthelyi ATE Haladás 4 3 – 1 10- 2 6

------------------------------------------------------------------------

2. Ajkai Hungalu SK 4 3 – 1 7- 4 6

3. Paksi SE 4 – – 4 2-13 –

== See also ==
- 1987–88 Magyar Kupa
- 1987–88 Nemzeti Bajnokság I
- 1987–88 Nemzeti Bajnokság II
