= 1986–87 Nemzeti Bajnokság III =

Nemzeti Bajnokság III
- Season: 1986–87
- Champions: Ajkai Hungalu SK (Bakony); Mohácsi TSz SE (Dráva); III. Kerületi TTVE (Duna); Kecskeméti SC (Kőrös); Kazincbarcikai Vegyész SE (Mátra); Debreceni Kinizsi SE (Tisza)
- Promoted: Ajkai Hungalu SK (Bakony); III. Kerületi TTVE (Duna); Kecskeméti SC (Kőrös); Kazincbarcikai Vegyész SE (Mátra)

The 1986–87 Nemzeti Bajnokság III season was the 5th edition of the Nemzeti Bajnokság III. The winners of the six groups played promotion play-off matches.

== League tables ==
=== Bakony group ===
Pos	Teams	Pld	W	D	L	GF	GA	GD	Pts	Promotion or relegation
1	Ajkai Hungalu SK	34	25	6	3	67	17	50	56	Advance to play-offs
2	Ajkai Bányász	34	21	5	8	53	34	19	47	
3	Soproni SE	34	18	10	6	82	29	53	46	
4	Tapolcai Bauxitbányász SE	34	16	10	8	58	33	25	42	
5	MÁV DAC	34	15	9	10	64	43	21	39	
6	Péti MTE	34	15	9	10	49	30	19	39	
7	Sabaria SE	34	15	9	10	42	34	8	39	
8	Honvéd Katona József SE	34	15	8	11	51	43	8	38	
9	MOTIM TE	34	14	9	11	44	40	4	37	
10	Répcelaki Bányász SE	34	12	11	11	34	38	-4	35	
11	Sárvári Kinizsi	34	12	8	14	55	58	-3	32	
12	Pápai SE	34	7	16	11	32	46	-14	30	
13	Szentgotthárdi MSE	34	10	10	14	41	57	-16	30	
14	Soproni Postás SK	34	11	7	16	49	58	-9	29	
15	Győri Dózsa SK	34	10	9	15	33	45	-12	29	
16	Celldömölki VMSE	34	7	9	18	43	68	-25	23	
17	Lenti TE	34	2	8	24	27	86	-59	12	
18	Kapuvár SE	34	2	5	27	27	92	-65	9	

=== Dráva group ===
Pos	Teams	Pld	W	D	L	GF	GA	GD	Pts	Promotion or relegation
1	Mohácsi TSz SE	30	17	11	2	45	9	36	45	Advance to play-offs
2	Marcali VSE	30	13	10	7	47	28	19	36	
3	Paksi SE	30	13	10	7	39	31	8	36	
4	MÁV Nagykanizsa TE	30	12	8	10	40	32	8	32	
5	Pécsi VSK	30	9	14	7	41	34	7	32	
6	Bólyi MEDOSZ SE	30	9	14	7	35	33	2	32	
7	Sellyei SK	30	10	10	10	46	43	3	30	
8	Dombóvári VMSE	30	8	14	8	34	33	1	30	
9	Siklósi Tenkes SE	30	7	16	7	32	35	-3	30	
10	Mázaszászvári Bányász	30	9	12	9	35	41	-6	30	
11	Bonyhádi MSC	30	10	9	11	38	33	5	29	
12	Dombóvári Vasas	30	11	7	12	44	47	-3	29	
13	Honvéd Táncsics SE	30	9	10	11	23	28	-5	28	
14	Nagyatádi VSE	30	7	14	9	25	38	-13	28	Relegation to Megyei Bajnokság I
15	Szigetvár	30	6	6	18	28	47	-19	18	Relegation to Megyei Bajnokság I
16	Kisdorogi MEDOSZ SE	30	5	5	20	24	64	-40	15	Relegation to Megyei Bajnokság I

=== Duna group ===
Pos	Teams	Pld	W	D	L	GF	GA	GD	Pts	Promotion or relegation
1	III. Kerületi TTVE	34	20	11	3	70	33	37	51	Advance to play-offs
2	ESMTK	34	19	10	5	53	35	18	48	
3	Dorogi Bányász SC	34	18	9	7	56	27	29	45	
4	Oroszlányi Bányász SK	34	16	11	7	67	30	37	43	
5	Esztergomi MIM Vasas	34	13	15	6	49	30	19	41	
6	BKV Előre SC	34	15	9	10	47	48	-1	39	
7	Ráckevei Aranykalász TSZ SK	34	12	11	11	46	43	3	35	
8	Budapesti VSC	34	11	12	11	43	35	8	34	
9	Kartali MEDOSZ	34	13	7	14	46	46	0	33	
10	Pénzügyőr SE	34	10	13	11	39	47	-8	33	
11	Várpalotai Bányász SK	34	11	10	13	54	49	5	32	
12	Érdi VSE	34	10	11	13	50	59	-9	31	
13	Honvéd Osztapenko SE	34	7	16	11	38	40	-2	30	
14	Dunai Kőolaj SK	34	11	8	15	46	55	-9	30	
15	Dömsödi Dózsa TSz	34	8	12	14	35	58	-23	28	
16	Vasas Ikarus SK	34	7	13	14	43	53	-10	27	Relegation to Megyei Bajnokság I
17	Magyar Viscosa SE	34	5	9	20	34	78	-44	19	Relegation to Megyei Bajnokság I
18	Honvéd Rákóczi SE	34	4	5	25	31	81	-50	13	Relegation to Megyei Bajnokság I

=== Kőrös group ===
Pos	Teams	Pld	W	D	L	GF	GA	GD	Pts	Promotion or relegation
1	Kecskeméti SC	30	24	5	1	65	14	51	53	Advance to play-offs
2	Építők SC	30	16	6	8	49	27	22	38	
3	Miskei TSZ SK	30	15	7	8	43	33	10	37	
4	Honvéd Kun Béla SE	30	15	6	9	43	32	11	36	
5	Orosházi MTK	30	14	6	10	37	25	12	34	
6	Kecskeméti TE	30	12	8	10	46	35	11	32	
7	Soltvadkerti TE	30	12	8	10	41	44	-3	32	
8	Mezőkovácsházi TE	30	9	12	9	41	44	-3	30	
9	Csongrádi SC	30	9	11	10	29	35	-6	29	
10	Gyulai SE	30	9	10	11	50	44	6	28	
11	Szentesi Vízmű SK	30	9	8	13	36	35	1	26	
12	Honvéd Köteles Jenő SE	30	10	6	14	37	41	-4	26	
13	Békési SE	30	8	8	14	37	48	-11	24	
14	Szegedi VSE	30	8	8	14	27	38	-11	24	Relegation to Megyei Bajnokság I
15	Lajosmizse	30	6	6	18	31	70	-39	18	Relegation to Megyei Bajnokság I
16	Makó	30	3	7	20	28	75	-47	13	Relegation to Megyei Bajnokság I

=== Mátra group ===
Pos	Teams	Pld	W	D	L	GF	GA	GD	Pts	Promotion or relegation
1	Kazincbarcikai Vegyész SE	30	21	4	5	63	20	43	46	Advance to play-offs
2	Honvéd Papp József SE	30	13	11	6	39	27	12	37	
3	Salgótarjáni Síküveg	30	15	6	9	41	34	7	36	
4	Recski Ércbányász	30	13	9	8	47	41	6	35	
5	Edelényi Bányász	30	13	8	9	51	45	6	34	
6	Bélapátfalvai Építők	30	13	7	10	48	35	13	33	
7	Borsodi Bányász SE	30	12	8	10	47	46	1	32	
8	Gyöngyösi SE	30	12	7	11	42	31	11	31	
9	Nagybátonyi Bányász SC	30	10	11	9	35	27	8	31	
10	Romhányi Kerámia SE 1	30	11	10	9	35	28	7	30	
11	Hatvani KVSC	30	11	8	11	33	31	2	30	
12	Sajóbábonyi Vegyész SE	30	9	11	10	40	43	-3	29	
13	Olefin SC	30	10	6	14	43	49	-6	26	
14	Salgótarjáni Kohász SE	30	8	7	15	33	53	-20	23	Relegation to Megyei Bajnokság I
15	Borsodi Építők Volán SC	30	6	6	18	29	52	-23	18	
16	Apc	30	2	3	25	17	81	-64	7	Relegation to Megyei Bajnokság I

Notes

1. 2 points deducted

=== Tisza group ===
Pos	Teams	Pld	W	D	L	GF	GA	GD	Pts	Promotion or relegation
1	Debreceni Kinizsi SE	30	21	6	3	72	20	52	48	Advance to play-offs
2	Honvéd Szabó Lajos SE	30	16	6	8	64	26	38	38	
3	Jászberényi Lehel SE	30	14	10	6	32	25	7	38	
4	Debreceni Universitas SE	30	15	7	8	48	31	17	37	
5	Balmazújvárosi Lenin TSz SE	30	14	9	7	43	30	13	37	
6	Honvéd Asztalos János SE	30	11	11	8	36	30	6	33	
7	Hajdúböszörményi Bocskai SE	30	10	11	9	37	30	7	31	
8	Volán Rákóczi SE	30	11	8	11	40	39	1	30	
9	Kabai Egyetértés SE	30	10	10	10	23	26	-3	30	
10	Püspökladányi MÁV Egyetértés SE	30	10	9	11	31	35	-4	29	
11	Rakamazi Spartacus SE	30	9	8	13	41	48	-7	26	
12	Karcagi SE	30	9	7	14	28	47	-19	25	
13	Tisza Cipő SE	30	6	13	11	33	56	-23	25	
14	Hajdúszoboszlói Bocskai SE	30	8	7	15	38	55	-17	23	
15	Nyíregyházi Volán Dózsa	30	8	5	17	31	51	-20	21	
16	Mátészalkai MTK	30	1	7	22	20	68	-48	9	

== Promotion play-offs ==
=== Group A ===
Pos	Team	Pld	W	D	L	GF	GA	GD	Pts	
1	Ajkai Hungalu SE	4	2	0	1	6	4	2	4	Promotion to Nemzeti Bajnokság II
2	III. Kerületi TTVE	4	2	0	2	6	5	1	4	Promotion to Nemzeti Bajnokság II
3	Mohácsi TSZ SE	4	2	0	2	4	7	-3	4	

==== Matches ====
Team	Match 1	Match 2	Team
III. Kerületi TTVE	1–2	2–0	Ajka Hungalu SE
Mohácsi TSZ SE	2–1	1–2	III. Kerületi TTVE
Ajkai Hungalu SE	4–0	0–1	Mohácsi TSZ SE

=== Group B ===
Pos	Team	Pld	W	D	L	GF	GA	GD	Pts	
1	Kazincbarcikai Vegyész SE	4	2	1	1	5	4	1	5	Promotion to Nemzeti Bajnokság II
2	Kecskeméti SC	4	1	2	1	4	4	0	4	Promotion to Nemzeti Bajnokság II
3	Debreceni Kinizsi SE	4	1	1	2	5	6	-1	3	

==== Matches ====
Team	Match 1	Match 2	Team
Kazincbarcikai Vegyész SE	1–0	1–0	Kecskeméti SC
Debreceni Kinizsi SE	3–1	0–2	Kazincbarcikai Vegyész SE
Kecskeméti SC	3–2	0–0	Debreceni Kinizsi SE

== See also ==
- 1986–87 Magyar Kupa
- 1986–87 Nemzeti Bajnokság I
- 1986–87 Nemzeti Bajnokság II
