= 1994–95 Nemzeti Bajnokság II =

Nemzeti Bajnokság II
- Season: 1994–95
- Champions: Szombathelyi Haladás (West); MTK Budapest FC (East)
- Promoted: Szombathelyi Haladás (West); MTK Budapest FC (East)
- Relegated: Baja (West); ESMTK (West); Pécsi VSK (West); Beremendi Építők SK (West); Balmazújvárosi FC (East); Hódmezővásárhelyi FC (East); Szarvas (East); Miksolci VSC

The 1994–95 Nemzeti Bajnokság II was the 97th season of the Nemzeti Bajnokság II, the second tier of the Hungarian football league.

== League table ==
=== Western group ===
Pos	Team	Pld	W	D	L	GF	GA	GD	Pts	Promotion or relegation
1	Haladás VSE	30	20	2	8	56	25	+31	62	Promotion to Nemzeti Bajnokság I
2	BKV Előre SC	30	18	6	6	60	34	+26	60	
3	Siófoki Bányász FC	30	16	9	5	46	22	+24	57	
4	Budafoki LC	30	15	9	6	47	38	+9	54	
5	Veszprém FC	30	13	10	7	38	28	+10	49	
6	Paksi ASE	30	14	5	11	35	30	+5	47	
7	Mohácsi FC	30	12	9	9	36	26	+10	45	
8	Dunaferr SE	30	11	10	9	28	25	+3	43	
9	Keszthelyi Haladás HSE	30	10	10	10	48	40	+8	40	
10	Százhalombatta FC	30	10	8	12	42	51	−9	38	
11	MATÁV SC Sopron	30	10	5	15	40	46	−6	35	
12	Tatabányai SC	30	9	5	16	33	48	−15	32	
13	Bajai FC (Note: Due to financial problems will play in the Nemzeti Bajnokság III next season.)	30	9	5	16	31	56	−25	32	Relegation to Nemzeti Bajnokság III
14	ESMTK-Hungaplast	30	7	6	17	24	54	−30	27	Relegation to Nemzeti Bajnokság III
15	Pécsi VSK	30	2	7	21	21	57	−36	13	Relegation to Nemzeti Bajnokság III
16	Beremendi Építők SK	30	9	4	17	41	46	−5	4 (Note: 27 points deducted)	Relegation to Nemzeti Bajnokság III

=== Eastern group ===
Pos	Team	Pld	W	D	L	GF	GA	GD	Pts	Promotion or relegation
1	MTK Budapest	30	24	3	3	74	21	+53	75	Promotion to Nemzeti Bajnokság I
2	Salgótarjáni BTC	30	16	5	9	60	41	+19	53	
3	Kazincbarcikai SC	30	15	4	11	49	45	+4	49	
4	Tiszakécske FC	30	13	9	8	45	22	+23	48	
5	III. Kerületi TVE	30	14	6	10	55	41	+14	48	
6	Nyíregyházi FC	30	14	6	10	40	34	+6	48	
7	Diósgyőri FC	30	12	10	8	47	33	+14	46	
8	Kabai Cukor FC	30	13	7	10	43	32	+11	46	
9	Tiszavasvári Alkaloida SE	30	12	7	11	49	46	+3	43	
10	FC Hatvan	30	10	10	10	32	38	−6	40	
11	Hajdúnánási FC	30	10	8	12	27	38	−11	38	
12	Gödöllő-Verzál LC	30	9	8	13	32	43	−11	35	
13	Balmazújvárosi SC	30	9	6	15	41	54	−13	33	Relegation to Nemzeti Bajnokság III
14	Hódmezővásárhelyi LC-West Radial	30	7	7	16	34	64	−30	28	Relegation to Nemzeti Bajnokság III
15	Szarvasi Vasas SSE	30	6	9	15	25	45	−20	27	Relegation to Nemzeti Bajnokság III
16	Miskolci VSC	30	2	3	25	19	75	−56	6 (Note: 3 points were deducted due to the illegal play of Kobolák.)	Relegation to Nemzeti Bajnokság III

== See also ==
- 1994–95 Magyar Kupa
- 1994–95 Nemzeti Bajnokság I
