= 1986–87 Nemzeti Bajnokság II =

Nemzeti Bajnokság II
- Season: 1986–87
- Champions: Kaposvári Rákóczi FC
- Promoted: Kaposvári Rákóczi FC (winners); Váci Izzó(runners-up)
- Relegated: Keszthelyi Haladás; Bajai SK; Budafoki MTE; Szarvasi Vasas

The 1986–87 Nemzeti Bajnokság II was the 89th season of the Nemzeti Bajnokság II, the second tier of the Hungarian football league.

== League table ==
| Pos | Team | Pld | W | D | L | GF | GA | GD | Pts | Promotion or relegation |
|---|---|---|---|---|---|---|---|---|---|---|
| 1 | Kaposvári Rákóczi SC | 38 | 21 | 10 | 7 | 52 | 35 | +17 | 52 | Promotion to Nemzeti Bajnokság I |
| 2 | Váci Izzó MTE | 38 | 21 | 9 | 8 | 56 | 32 | +24 | 51 | Promotion to Nemzeti Bajnokság I |
| 3 | Volán SC | 38 | 20 | 6 | 12 | 67 | 50 | +17 | 46 | |
| 4 | Csepel SC | 38 | 18 | 10 | 10 | 52 | 36 | +16 | 46 | |
| 5 | Komlói Bányász SK | 38 | 18 | 5 | 15 | 64 | 56 | +8 | 41 | |
| 6 | Szegedi EOL Délép SE | 38 | 15 | 10 | 13 | 59 | 46 | +13 | 40 | |
| 7 | Szolnoki MÁV MTE | 38 | 14 | 11 | 13 | 44 | 38 | +6 | 39 | |
| 8 | Hódmezővásárhelyi Metripond | 38 | 15 | 8 | 15 | 58 | 43 | +15 | 38 | |
| 9 | Veszprémi SE | 38 | 14 | 10 | 14 | 41 | 44 | −3 | 38 | |
| 10 | Salgótarjáni BTC | 38 | 10 | 16 | 12 | 36 | 41 | −5 | 36 | |
| 11 | Ganz Mávag SE | 38 | 13 | 10 | 15 | 43 | 51 | −8 | 36 | |
| 12 | Szekszárdi Dózsa | 38 | 12 | 10 | 16 | 51 | 59 | −8 | 34 | |
| 13 | Diósgyőri VTK | 38 | 9 | 16 | 13 | 38 | 51 | −13 | 34 | |
| 14 | Nagykanizsai Olajbányász SE | 38 | 9 | 16 | 13 | 42 | 58 | −16 | 34 | |
| 15 | Nyíregyházi VSSC | 38 | 17 | 9 | 12 | 57 | 53 | +4 | 33 (Note: 10 points deducted) | |
| 16 | Ózdi Kohász SE | 38 | 12 | 9 | 17 | 46 | 49 | −3 | 33 | |
| 17 | Keszthelyi Haladás SC | 38 | 10 | 13 | 15 | 32 | 40 | −8 | 33 | Relegation to Nemzeti Bajnokság III |
| 18 | Bajai SK | 38 | 13 | 7 | 18 | 38 | 48 | −10 | 33 | Relegation to Nemzeti Bajnokság III |
| 19 | Budafoki MTE | 38 | 11 | 8 | 19 | 42 | 60 | −18 | 30 | Relegation to Nemzeti Bajnokság III |
| 20 | Szarvasi Vasas | 38 | 8 | 7 | 23 | 40 | 68 | −28 | 23 | Relegation to Nemzeti Bajnokság III |

== See also ==
- 1986–87 Magyar Kupa
- 1986–87 Nemzeti Bajnokság I
