= 1992–93 Nemzeti Bajnokság III =

Nemzeti Bajnokság III
- Season: 1992–93
- Champions: Tiszakécske LC (Alföld); Keszthelyi Haladás SE (Bakony); Beremendi Építők SK (Dráva); Százhalombatta FC (Duna); Rákospalotai EAC (Mátra); Balmazújvárosi SC (Tisza)
- Promoted: Tiszakécske LC (Alföld); Keszthelyi Haladás SE (Bakony); Beremendi Építők SK (Dráva); Százhalombatta FC (Duna); Rákospalotai EAC (Mátra); Balmazújvárosi SC (Tisza)

The 1992–93 Nemzeti Bajnokság III season was the 12th edition of the Nemzeti Bajnokság III.

== League tables ==
=== Alföld group ===
Pos	Team	Pld	W	D	L	GF	GA	GD	Pts	Promotion or relegation
1	Tiszakécske LC	30	23	5	2	69	21	+48	51	Promotion to Nemzeti Bajnokság II
2	Kecskeméti SC	30	16	7	7	47	26	+21	39	
3	Hódmezővásárhelyi LC	30	17	5	8	49	29	+20	39	
4	Szegedi Dózsa SC	30	12	12	6	50	32	+18	36	
5	Mezőkovácsházi TE	30	13	9	8	49	46	+3	35	
6	Makó FC	30	14	7	9	56	42	+14	33 (Note: 2 points deducted)	
7	Szegedi VSE	30	12	9	9	46	34	+12	33	
8	Gyulai FC	30	12	7	11	32	33	−1	31	
9	Orosházi MTK	30	11	8	11	36	37	−1	30	
10	Kecskeméti TE	30	9	8	13	36	42	−6	26	
11	Miske TSZ SK	30	9	9	12	38	44	−6	25 (Note: 2 points deducted)	Relegation to Megyei Bajnokság I
12	Gyomaendrődi BSE	30	7	11	12	33	39	−6	25	
13	Ceglédi Kossuth Honvéd SE	30	6	12	12	31	42	−11	24	
14	Nagyszénási SE	30	6	7	17	30	66	−36	19	Relegation to Megyei Bajnokság I
15	Kiskundorozsmai ESK	30	5	7	18	26	72	−46	17	Relegation to Megyei Bajnokság I
16	Dabas-Sári FC	30	5	4	21	32	55	−23	8 (Note: 6 points deducted)	Relegation to Megyei Bajnokság I

=== Bakony group ===
Pos	Team	Pld	W	D	L	GF	GA	GD	Pts	Promotion or relegation
1	Keszthelyi Haladás SE	28	17	6	5	60	31	+29	40	Promotion to Nemzeti Bajnokság II
2	Linde SE Répcelak	28	15	7	6	52	27	+25	37	
3	Soproni Távközlési SE	28	15	7	6	61	40	+21	37	
4	Balatonfüredi SC	28	14	7	7	43	25	+18	35	
5	MOTIM TE	28	14	6	8	62	34	+28	34	
6	Hévízi SK	28	13	5	10	48	33	+15	31	
7	Betka-MÁV DAC	28	9	10	9	31	37	−6	28	
8	Győri Dózsa SE	28	10	7	11	40	48	−8	27	
9	Körmendi FC	28	9	8	11	37	36	+1	26	
10	Ajkai Bányász SE	28	10	5	13	46	51	−5	25	
11	Tapolcai Bauxit Ifjúsági SE	28	9	5	14	32	50	−18	23	
12	Szentgotthárdi MSE	28	9	4	15	38	61	−23	22	
13	Peremarton SC	28	9	3	16	57	73	−16	21	
14	Sárvári Kinizsi SE	28	7	4	17	26	54	−28	18	Relegation to Megyei Bajnokság I
15	Herendi Porcelán SC	28	4	8	16	28	61	−33	16	Relegation to Megyei Bajnokság I
16	Hegyeshalmi VSE (Note: withdrew)	0	0	0	0	0	0	0	0	Relegation to Megyei Bajnokság I

=== Dráva group ===
Pos	Team	Pld	W	D	L	GF	GA	GD	Pts	Promotion or relegation
1	Beremendi Építők SK	30	20	9	1	61	24	+37	49	Promotion to Nemzeti Bajnokság II
2	Komlói Bányász SK	30	15	10	5	60	28	+32	40	
3	Pécsi VSK	30	14	9	7	47	34	+13	37	
4	Bólyi SE	30	11	13	6	43	35	+8	35	
5	Kaposvári Honvéd SE	30	9	13	8	34	37	−3	31	
6	Nagyatádi VSE	30	11	8	11	54	45	+9	30	
7	Letenye SE	30	11	7	12	47	51	−4	29	
8	Kisdorogi MEDOSZ SE	30	11	7	12	42	46	−4	29	
9	Fonyódi Petőfi SE	30	10	9	11	35	46	−11	29	
10	Paksi SE	30	9	9	12	43	41	+2	27	
11	Bonyhádi SE	30	9	9	12	42	41	+1	27	
12	Marcali VSE	30	8	10	12	38	37	+1	26	
13	Gerjeni MEDOSZ SE	30	10	6	14	44	60	−16	26	
14	Barcsi SC	30	8	9	13	36	49	−13	25	
15	Kaposvári Gazdász SE	30	9	6	15	33	58	−25	24	Relegation to Megyei Bajnokság I
16	Balatonlellei SE	30	4	8	18	33	60	−27	16	Relegation to Megyei Bajnokság I

=== Duna group ===
Pos	Team	Pld	W	D	L	GF	GA	GD	Pts	Promotion or relegation
1	Százhalombatta FC	30	22	7	1	77	19	+58	51	Promotion to Nemzeti Bajnokság II
2	Érdi VSE	30	17	7	6	47	30	+17	41	
3	Dunavarsány KSK	30	12	10	8	51	35	+16	34	
4	Szentendrei Petőfi HSE	30	13	8	9	49	46	+3	34	
5	Lajoskomáromi Szövetkezet SE	30	13	7	10	54	65	−11	33	
6	Honvéd Szondi Velence SE	30	10	11	9	44	43	+1	31	
7	MALÉV SC-Rodexco	30	10	10	10	51	45	+6	30	
8	Esztergomi MIM Vasas SE	30	10	9	11	49	49	0	29	
9	Ercsi Kinizsi SK	30	10	8	12	44	41	+3	28	
10	EAC Rádiótaxi (Note: In the autumn, Ludens AFC played instead of EAC-Rádiótaxi)	30	7	14	9	32	41	−9	28	
11	Szigetszentmiklósi TK	30	11	5	14	47	52	−5	27	
12	Rákosmenti TK	30	10	6	14	47	52	−5	26	
13	Dömsödi VSE	30	9	7	14	40	56	−16	25	
14	Dreher Sörgyár SE	30	6	11	13	36	44	−8	23	Relegation to Megyei Bajnokság I
15	Solymári SE	30	8	7	15	33	51	−18	23	
16	Magyar Viscosa SE	30	4	9	17	28	60	−32	17	Relegation to Megyei Bajnokság I

=== Mátra group ===
Pos	Team	Pld	W	D	L	GF	GA	GD	Pts	Promotion or relegation
1	Rákospalotai EAC	30	18	5	7	58	29	+29	41	Promotion to Nemzeti Bajnokság II
2	Gyöngyösi SE	30	17	6	7	60	32	+28	40	
3	Jászberényi SE	30	17	5	8	57	25	+32	39	
4	Karcag Épkar VSE	30	17	5	8	61	33	+28	39	
5	Szolnoki MÁV MTE	30	16	6	8	48	27	+21	38	
6	Füzesabony SC	30	14	9	7	40	30	+10	37	
7	Dunakeszi VSE	30	14	8	8	52	27	+25	36	
8	Balassagyarmati LC	30	14	4	12	40	36	+4	32	
9	Monori SE	30	11	8	11	38	35	+3	30	
10	Pásztói FC	30	9	10	11	38	39	−1	28	
11	Szolnoki Cukor FC	30	9	8	13	39	40	−1	26	
12	Herédi SE	30	10	5	15	40	53	−13	25	
13	Törökszentmiklósi SE	30	9	5	16	46	66	−20	23	
14	Jászapáti Szövetkezeti SE	30	6	8	16	20	61	−41	20	Relegation to Megyei Bajnokság I
15	Salgótarjáni Kohász SE	30	5	6	19	30	76	−46	16	Relegation to Megyei Bajnokság I
16	Rákóczifalvai SE	30	2	4	24	28	86	−58	8	Relegation to Megyei Bajnokság I

=== Tisza group ===
Pos	Team	Pld	W	D	L	GF	GA	GD	Pts	Promotion or relegation
1	Balmazújvárosi SC	30	20	9	1	73	29	+44	49	Promotion to Nemzeti Bajnokság II
2	Rakamazi Spartacus SE	30	15	8	7	45	35	+10	38	
3	Kisvárdai SE	30	15	7	8	53	35	+18	37	
4	Mátészalkai MTK	30	14	7	9	52	38	+14	35	
5	Szerencs-Hegyalja SE	30	12	9	9	43	29	+14	33	
6	Nagykálló SE	30	9	14	7	35	31	+4	32	
7	Borsodi Építők Volán SC	30	12	8	10	38	37	+1	32	
8	Edelényi VSE	30	9	13	8	35	28	+7	31	
9	Hajdúszoboszlói VSE	30	10	10	10	42	39	+3	30	
10	Ózdi Kohász SE	30	9	11	10	43	45	−2	29	
11	Olefin SC	30	9	10	11	37	54	−17	28	
12	Miskolci VSC	30	9	8	13	39	57	−18	26	
13	Derecske SSE	30	9	7	14	35	53	−18	25	
14	Abaújszántó KSE	30	8	6	16	47	57	−10	22	Relegation to Megyei Bajnokság I
15	Sajóbábonyi Vegyész SE	30	6	5	19	26	52	−26	17	Relegation to Megyei Bajnokság I
16	Bélapátfalvai Építők SE	30	5	6	19	35	59	−24	16	Relegation to Megyei Bajnokság I

== See also ==
- 1992–93 Magyar Kupa
- 1992–93 Nemzeti Bajnokság I
- 1992–93 Nemzeti Bajnokság II
