= 1988–89 Nemzeti Bajnokság III =

Nemzeti Bajnokság III
- Season: 1988–89
- Champions: Szegedi Dózsa SC (Alföld); Ajkai Hungalu (Bakony); Paksi SE (Dráva); Budafoki MTE-Törley (Duna); Salgótarjáni Síküveggyár (Mátra); Mezőtúri Honvéd SE (Tisza)
- Promoted: Szegedi Dózsa SC (Alföld); Ajkai Hungalu (Bakony); Paksi SE (Dráva); Budafoki MTE-Törley (Duna); Salgótarjáni Síküveggyár (Mátra); Mezőtúri Honvéd SE (Tisza)

The 1988–89 Nemzeti Bajnokság III season was the 7th edition of the Nemzeti Bajnokság III. In this season, if a match ended with a draw, penalty shootouts were performed. Teams that won on penalties received 2 points, while the losing teams received 1 point. Kőrös group was renamed as Alföld group (derives from Great Hungarian Plain).

== League tables ==
=== Alföld group ===
Pos	Team	Pld	W	PKW	PKL	L	GF	GA	GD	Pts	Promotion or relegation
1	Szegedi Dózsa SC	30	20	3	5	2	58	19	+39	71	Promotion to Nemzeti Bajnokság II
2	Gyulai SE	30	17	4	2	7	54	32	+22	61	
3	Pénzügyőr SE	30	14	6	3	7	45	27	+18	57	
4	Honvéd Osztapenko SE	30	16	3	3	8	51	38	+13	57	
5	Miskei TSZ SK	30	14	3	3	10	48	33	+15	51	
6	Szentesi Vízmű SK	30	10	7	5	8	36	36	0	49	
7	Csongrádi SC	30	11	4	5	10	38	30	+8	46	
8	Kiskőrös	30	12	0	6	12	49	41	+8	42	
9	Kecskeméti TE	30	10	3	5	12	43	37	+6	41	
10	Mezőkovácsháza	30	10	3	5	12	41	43	−2	41	
11	Mezőhegyes	30	9	3	8	10	30	37	−7	41	
12	Orosházi MTK	30	9	4	4	13	45	42	+3	39	
13	Honvéd Kun Béla SE	30	5	8	2	15	28	44	−16	33	Relegation to Megyei Bajnokság I
14	Békési SE	30	8	3	3	16	32	54	−22	33	Relegation to Megyei Bajnokság I
15	Soltvadkert	30	6	4	3	17	31	71	−40	29	Relegation to Megyei Bajnokság I
16	Szegedi VSE	30	6	5	1	18	32	77	−45	29	Relegation to Megyei Bajnokság I

=== Bakony group ===
Pos	Team	Pld	W	PKW	PKL	L	GF	GA	GD	Pts	Promotion or relegation
1	Ajkai Hungalu	30	21	2	4	3	53	11	+42	71	Promotion to Nemzeti Bajnokság II
2	Ajkai Bányász	30	20	4	3	3	54	19	+35	71	
3	Sabaria SE	30	16	3	6	5	56	25	+31	60	
4	Peremartoni SC	30	12	5	3	10	49	36	+13	49	
5	Motim TE	30	11	6	3	10	37	30	+7	48	
6	Honvéd Katona József SE	30	13	3	2	12	37	42	−5	47	
7	Pápai SE	30	12	3	2	13	28	43	−15	44	
8	Petőházi Cukorgyári SE	30	9	4	8	9	34	32	+2	43	
9	Győri Dózsa SK	30	9	5	5	11	40	32	+8	42	
10	Répcelaki Bányász	30	12	1	4	13	39	47	−8	42	
11	NIKE Fűzfői AK	30	9	6	2	13	30	41	−11	41	
12	MÁV DAC (Győr)	30	9	4	5	12	37	43	−6	40	
13	Celldömölki VMSE	30	9	2	3	16	30	49	−19	34	
14	Szentgotthárdi MSE	30	8	4	2	16	32	58	−26	34	Relegation to Megyei Bajnokság I
15	Sárvári Kinizsi	30	7	4	1	18	33	56	−23	30	Relegation to Megyei Bajnokság I
16	Zala Volán MTE	30	4	3	6	17	24	49	−25	24	Relegation to Megyei Bajnokság I

=== Dráva group ===
Pos	Team	Pld	W	PKW	PKL	L	GF	GA	GD	Pts	Promotion or relegation
1	Paksi SE	30	24	1	1	4	64	17	+47	75	Promotion to Nemzeti Bajnokság II
2	Paksi Atomerőmű SE	30	20	3	5	2	58	15	+43	71	
3	Bólyi Medosz SE	30	16	4	5	5	54	27	+27	61	
4	Kaposvári Honvéd SE	30	15	4	4	7	49	30	+19	57	
5	Mázaszászvár	30	14	6	1	9	54	37	+17	55	
6	Bonyhádi SE	30	14	2	2	12	47	39	+8	48	
7	Siklósi Tenkes SE	30	14	2	2	12	45	47	−2	48	
8	Szigetvári SE	30	11	3	6	10	43	48	−5	45	
9	Marcali VSE	30	10	4	5	11	42	42	0	43	
10	Nagykanizsai Volán Dózsa	30	8	7	3	12	36	35	+1	41	
11	MÁV Nagykanizsai TE	30	9	3	5	13	38	36	+2	38	
12	Dombóvári Vasas	30	8	3	4	15	27	39	−12	34	
13	Boglárlelle SE	30	6	6	4	14	35	56	−21	34	
14	Dunaföldvári SE	30	7	2	4	17	42	60	−18	29	Relegation to Megyei Bajnokság I
15	Dombóvári VMSE	30	7	2	1	20	33	57	−24	26	Relegation to Megyei Bajnokság I
16	Sellyei SK	30	3	2	2	23	28	110	−82	15	Relegation to Megyei Bajnokság I

=== Duna group ===
Pos	Team	Pld	W	PKW	PKL	L	GF	GA	GD	Pts	Promotion or relegation
1	Budafoki MTE-Törley	28	15	2	8	3	55	30	+25	57	Promotion to Nemzeti Bajnokság II
2	Dömsödi Dózsa TSz SK	28	14	4	5	5	48	38	+10	55	
3	Péti MTE	28	12	5	4	7	55	41	+14	50	
4	Várpalotai Bányász SK	28	13	3	5	7	51	40	+11	50	
5	Dunai Kőolaj	28	13	2	6	7	40	33	+7	49	
6	Dunakeszi VSE	28	13	1	5	9	46	39	+7	46	
7	Érdi Városi SE	28	10	7	2	9	47	42	+5	46	
8	Rákosmenti TK	28	11	4	3	10	41	37	+4	44	
9	Gödöllői SC	28	11	3	3	11	42	38	+4	42	
10	Sárisápi Bányász	28	8	7	4	9	39	39	0	42	
11	BKV Előre	28	9	6	3	10	39	45	−6	42	
12	Magyar Kábel SC	28	5	10	3	10	21	25	−4	38	
13	Esztergomi MIM Vasas	28	8	2	4	14	37	50	−13	32	
14	Magyar Viscosa SE	28	5	2	2	19	22	44	−22	21	Relegation to Megyei Bajnokság I
15	Sárbogárdi Videoton	28	3	2	3	20	24	66	−42	16	Relegation to Megyei Bajnokság I
16	Erzsébeti SMTK (Note: withdrew?)	0	0	0	0	0	0	0	0	0	

=== Mátra group ===
Pos	Team	Pld	W	PKW	PKL	L	GF	GA	GD	Pts	Promotion or relegation
1	Salgótarjáni Síküveggyár	30	18	5	3	4	62	28	+34	67	Promotion to Nemzeti Bajnokság II
2	Honvéd Köteles Jenő SE	30	16	6	4	4	77	42	+35	64	
3	Salgótarjáni BTC	30	19	2	2	7	60	28	+32	63	
4	Mádi Bányász	30	17	1	3	9	54	35	+19	56	
5	Borsodi Bányász	30	11	6	4	9	40	34	+6	49	
6	Romhányi Kerámia SE	30	8	9	5	8	32	30	+2	47	
7	Balassagyarmati HVSE	30	12	4	3	11	36	41	−5	47	
8	Salgótarjáni Kohász	30	9	8	1	12	34	38	−4	44	
9	Apci Vasas	30	10	4	5	11	36	39	−3	43	
10	Edelényi Bányász	30	12	2	3	13	35	39	−4	43	
11	Bagi SE	30	10	3	4	13	41	43	−2	40	
12	Gyöngyösi SE	30	9	4	5	12	32	36	−4	40	
13	Nagybátonyi Bányász SC	30	7	4	9	10	40	48	−8	38	
14	Bélapátfalva	30	8	2	5	15	35	61	−26	33	Relegation to Megyei Bajnokság I
15	Recski Ércbányász	30	4	4	5	17	31	56	−25	25	Relegation to Megyei Bajnokság I
16	Hevesi SE	30	3	3	6	18	20	67	−47	21	Relegation to Megyei Bajnokság I

=== Tisza group ===
Pos	Team	Pld	W	PKW	PKL	L	GF	GA	GD	Pts	Promotion or relegation
1	Mezőtúri Honvéd SE	30	20	4	3	3	66	20	+46	71	Promotion to Nemzeti Bajnokság II
2	Rakamazi Spartacus SE	30	20	2	2	6	63	22	+41	66	
3	Tiszavasvári Lombik SE	30	18	5	2	5	64	29	+35	66	
4	Volán Rákóczi SE	30	17	3	5	5	52	24	+28	62	
5	Balmazújvárosi Lenin TSz SE	30	12	5	4	9	38	35	+3	50	
6	Kabai Egyetértés SE	30	13	4	2	11	38	33	+5	49	
7	Olefin SC	30	13	3	3	11	38	35	+3	48	
8	Hajdúböszörményi Bocskai SE	30	13	3	3	11	36	37	−1	48	
9	Törökszentmiklósi SE	30	12	3	2	13	44	35	+9	44	
10	Hajdúnánási Bocskai SE	30	11	2	7	10	39	41	−2	44	
11	Kisvárdai SE	30	9	6	3	12	47	46	+1	42	
12	Szeghalmi SC	30	11	1	2	16	39	65	−26	37	
13	Honvéd Asztalos János SE	30	4	5	7	14	24	45	−21	29	Relegation to Megyei Bajnokság I
14	Mezőcsáti Vörös Meteor	30	7	1	2	20	32	64	−32	25	Relegation to Megyei Bajnokság I
15	Jászkiséri TSz SE	30	6	2	1	21	20	75	−55	23	Relegation to Megyei Bajnokság I
16	Berettyóújfalu SE	30	2	3	4	21	28	62	−34	16	Relegation to Megyei Bajnokság I

== See also ==
- 1988–89 Magyar Kupa
- 1988–89 Nemzeti Bajnokság I
- 1988–89 Nemzeti Bajnokság II
