= Mohácsi FC =

Hungarian football club

- Full name: Mohácsi Futball Cub
- Founded: 1985
- Dissolved: 1996
Home colours

Mohácsi Football Club is a defunct professional football club based in Mohács, Baranya County Hungary.

== History ==
Mohács won the 1987–88 Nemzeti Bajnokság III season as Mohácsi Új Barázda TSZ SE. Following their promotion to the second division, the club spent eight consecutive seasons in the Nemzeti Bajnokság II. However, in the 1995–96 Nemzeti Bajnokság II season, Mohács finished in the 15th position and were relegated.

== Name changes ==
- – divestiture from Mohácsi TE
- 1985 – 1992: Mohácsi Új Barázda TSZ SE
- 1992 – 1996: Mohácsi Futball Club

== Honours ==
=== League ===
- Nemzeti Bajnokság III:
  - Winners (2): 1986–87, 1987–88

== Seasons ==
The table below shows the seasons of Mohácsi FC.

Season	Tier	Club's name	Position	Pts
1985–86	3	Mohácsi TSZ SE	2 / 16	45
1986–87	3	Mohácsi TSz SE	1 / 16	45
1987–88	3	Mohácsi Új Barázda TSZ SE	1 / 16	44
1988–89	2	Mohácsi TSZ SE	8 / 16	44
1989–90	2	Mohácsi Új Barázda TSZ SE	10 / 16	41
1990–91	2	Mohácsi Új Barázda TSZ SE	9 / 16	27
1991–92	2	Mohácsi TSZ SE	13 / 16	23
1992–93	2	Mohácsi FC	10 / 16	28
1993–94	2	Mohácsi FC	10 / 16	27
1994–95	2	Mohácsi FC	7 / 16	45
1995–96	2	Mohácsi FC	15 / 16	20
