= 1995–96 Nemzeti Bajnokság II =

Nemzeti Bajnokság II
- Season: 1995–96
- Champions: Siófok (West); III. Kerület (East)
- Promoted: Siófok (West); III. Kerület (East)
- Relegated: Mohácsi FC (West); Keszthelyi Haladás SC (West); Gödöllő-Naszálytej LC (East); Hódmezővásárhelyi Astra VFC (East)

The 1995–96 Nemzeti Bajnokság II was the 98th season of the Nemzeti Bajnokság II, the second tier of the Hungarian football league.

== League table ==
=== Western group ===
Pos	Team	Pld	W	D	L	GF	GA	GD	Pts	Promotion or relegation
1	Siófoki Bányász FC	30	19	8	3	63	25	+38	65	Promotion to Nemzeti Bajnokság I
2	Matáv SC Sopron	30	17	8	5	46	25	+21	59	
3	Rákóczi-Kaposcukor FC	30	17	7	6	44	19	+25	58	
4	Nagykanizsai Olajbányász SE	30	15	9	6	56	40	+16	54	
5	Dunaferr SE	30	13	12	5	52	36	+16	51	
6	BKV Előre SC	30	13	9	8	60	42	+18	48	
7	Paksi ASE	30	14	6	10	47	33	+14	48	
8	EMDSZ-Soproni LC	30	13	9	8	44	33	+11	48	
9	Százhalombattai FC	30	10	9	11	42	44	−2	39	
10	Balatonfüredi SC	30	9	7	14	35	47	−12	34	
11	Érdi VSE	30	9	6	15	35	43	−8	33	
12	Budafoki LC	30	9	5	16	43	54	−11	32	
13	Veszprém FC	30	7	7	16	32	59	−27	28	
14	Tatabányai FC	30	4	10	16	26	55	−29	22	
15	Mohácsi FC	30	4	8	18	28	68	−40	20	Relegation to Nemzeti Bajnokság III
16	Keszthelyi Haladás SC	30	5	4	21	32	62	−30	16 (Note: 3 points deducted due to late pay for Szilveszter Lázár.)	Relegation to Nemzeti Bajnokság III

=== Eastern group ===
Pos	Team	Pld	W	D	L	GF	GA	GD	Pts	Promotion or relegation
1	III. Kerületi TVE	30	20	6	4	66	21	+45	63 (Note: 3 points deducted due to the illegal play of György Perger in the match III.Ker TVE - Eger.)	Promotion to Nemzeti Bajnokság I
2	Tiszakécske FC	30	18	6	6	53	28	+25	60	
3	Diósgyőri FC	30	16	10	4	60	25	+35	58	
4	Kabai Cukor FC - Hajdúszoboszló	30	17	6	7	56	33	+23	57	
5	Kecskeméti TE	30	17	5	8	44	35	+9	56	
6	Tiszavasvári Alkaloida SE	30	14	8	8	44	31	+13	50	
7	Salgótarjáni Barátság TC	30	12	10	8	41	27	+14	46	
8	Nyíregyházi FC	30	13	4	13	47	42	+5	43	
9	Hajdúnánási FC	30	11	9	10	36	29	+7	42	
10	FC Hatvan	30	9	7	14	34	43	−9	34	
11	FC Eger-Egertej	30	7	11	12	38	41	−3	32	
12	FC Sényő	30	7	8	15	33	61	−28	29	
13	Kazincbarcikai SC	30	6	10	14	33	39	−6	28	
14	Kecskeméti SC-RSC	30	7	6	17	30	43	−13	27	
15	Gödöllő-Naszálytej LC	30	6	8	16	24	52	−28	26	Relegation to Nemzeti Bajnokság III
16	Hódmezővásárhelyi Astra VFC	30	2	2	26	13	102	−89	5 (Note: 3 points deducted due to the illegal play of Zoltán Győri in the match FC Eger - Hódmezővásárhely.)	Relegation to Nemzeti Bajnokság III

== Promotion play-off ==
Tiszakécskei FC – Pécsi MFC 0–0

Pécsi MFC – Tiszakécskei FC 0–0 (5–3 pen.)

Fehérvár Parmalat'96 FC – Diósgyőri FC 2–1 / 0–1

Diósgyőri FC - Fehérvár Parmalat'96 FC 2–2 / 2–1, 2–1, 2–2

== See also ==
- 1995–96 Magyar Kupa
- 1995–96 Nemzeti Bajnokság I
- 1995–96 Nemzeti Bajnokság III
