= Dániel Horváth =

Hungarian footballer

Personal information
- Full name: Dániel Márk Horváth
- Date of birth: 5 March 1996 (age 30)
- Place of birth: Győr, Hungary
- Height: 1.88 m (6 ft 2 in)
- Position: Goalkeeper

Team information
- Current team: Ajka
- Number: 31

Senior career*
Years	Team	Apps	(Gls)
2015–2017	Győri ETO FC	2	(0)
2017	→ Kozármisleny (loan)	12	(0)
2017–2018	Csákvár	10	(0)
2018–	Ajka	154	(0)

International career^{‡}
2013	Hungary U18	1	(0)
2014	Hungary U19	1	(0)
2017	Hungary U21	2	(0)
- * Club domestic league appearances and goals as of 31 May 2026 ‡ National team caps and goals as of 26 November 2017

Dániel Márk Horváth (born 5 March 1996) is a Hungarian footballer who plays for Ajka.

== International career ==
He was also part of the Hungarian U-20 team at the 2015 FIFA U-20 World Cup.
