= Beremendi SE =

Hungarian football club

- Full name: Beremendi Sportegyesület
- Founded: 1925
- Dissolved: 2017
Home colours

Beremendi Sportegyesület is a defunct professional football club based in Beremend, Baranya County, Hungary.

== History ==
Beremendi SE won the Dráva group of the 1992–93 Nemzeti Bajnokság III season and gained promotion to the second division.

== Name changes ==
- Beremendi SE: ? – 1951
- Beremendi Építők Sportkör: 1951 – ?
- Beremendi Építők Sportkör-Sport 36: ? – 2017
- 2017: dissolved

== Honours ==
=== League ===
- Nemzeti Bajnokság III:
  - Winners (1): 1992–93

== Seasons ==
As of July 1 2017.

Season	Tier	Club's name	Position	Pts
1935–36	3	Beremendi SE	0 / 9	
1948–49	5	Beremendi SE	2 / 11	29
1949–50	5	Beremendi SE	3 / 10	14
1950	5	Beremendi SE	5 / 12	12
1951	4	Beremendi Építők	1 / 10	17
1952	4	Beremendi Építők	1 / 10	
1953	3	Beremend	13 / 14	8
1954	4	Beremend	0 / 14	
1955	4	Beremendi Építők	4 / 10	18
1956	4	Beremendi Építők	0 / 13	
1957	4	Beremendi Építők	2 / 9	22
1957–58	5	Beremendi Építők	7 / 13	25
1958–59	5	Beremendi Éptők	2 / 10	25
1959–60	5	Beremendi Építők	1 / 8	20
1960–61	4	Beremendi Építők	13 / 16	21
1961–62	4	Beremend	15 / 16	10
1962–63	5	Beremend	7 / 14	23
1963	6	Beremend	4 / 14	16
1964	5	Beremend	16 / 16	14
1965	6	Beremend	4 / 10	24
1966	6	Beremend	1 / 1	
1967	5	Beremend	8 / 14	18
1968	5	Beremend	14 / 16	23
1969	5	Beremend	8 / 16	30
1970	5	Beremend	8 / 8	11
1970–71	5	Beremendi Építők	16 / 18	13
1971–72	5	Beremendi Építők	14 / 18	19
1972–73	5	Beremendi Építők	7 / 17	37
1973–74	5	Beremendi Építők	11 / 16	23
1974–75	4	Beremendi Építők	7 / 16	32
1975–76	4	Beremend	11 / 16	27
1976–77	4	Beremendi Építők	3 / 16	38
1977–78	4	Beremendi Építők	11 / 18	33
1978–79	3	Beremend	5 / 18	37
1979–80	3	Beremendi Építők	11 / 18	33
1980–81	3	Beremendi Építők	8 / 18	39
1981–82	4	Beremendi Építők SK	11 / 16	22
1982–83	4	Beremend	10 / 18	33
1983–84	4	Beremendi Építők	7 / 18	38
1984–85	4	Beremend	8 / 18	32
1985–86	4	Beremend	7 / 19	38
1986–87	4	Beremend	4 / 18	42
1987–88	4	Beremend	6 / 16	33
1988–89	4	Beremend	13 / 16	23
1989–90	4	Beremend	6 / 16	44
1990–91	4	Beremend	6 / 16	33
1991–92	4	Beremend	1 / 18	57
1992–93	3	Beremendi Építők SK	1 / 16	49
1993–94	2	Beremendi Építők SK	11 / 16	26
1994–95	2	Beremendi Építők SK	16 / 16	4
1995–96	3	Beremend	3 / 16	59
1996–97	3	Beremendi Építők	4 / 16	58
1997–98	3	Beremend	3 / 16	51
1998–99	3	Beremendi Építők SK	6 / 16	42
1999–2000	3	Beremendi Építők	8 / 16	35
2000	3	Beremendi Építők	6 / 8	14
2000–01	4	Beremendi Építők	3 / 11	39
2001–02	4	Beremendi Építők SK	9 / 14	31
2002–03	4	Beremendi Építők SK	9 / 16	36
2003–04	4	Beremendi Építők SK	3 / 16	60
2004–05	4	Beremend	3 / 15	47
2005–06	3	Beremendi Építők SK	10 / 16	34
2006–07	3	Beremendi Építők SK	13 / 14	23
2007–08	3	Beremendi ÉSK	12 / 18	40
2008–09	3	Beremendi Építők SK	12 / 16	31
2009–10	4	Beremendi ÉSK	8 / 16	41
2010–11	4	Beremendi Építők SK	6 / 16	54
2011–12	4	Beremendi Építők SK	8 / 16	47
2012–13	4	Beremendi Építők SK	11 / 16	34
2013–14	4	Beremend Építők SK-Sport 36	5 / 16	54
2014–15	4	Beremendi Építők SK-Sport 36	9 / 16	34
2015–16	4	Beremendi Építők SK-Sport 36	14 / 16	20
2016–17	4	Beremendi Építők SK-Sport 36	7 / 14	39
