= 1988–89 Nemzeti Bajnokság II =

Nemzeti Bajnokság II
- Season: 1988–89
- Champions: Csepel SC (West); Debreceni VSC (East)
- Promoted: Csepel SC (West); Debreceni VSC (East)
- Relegated: Kaposvári Rákóczi FC (West); Erzsébeti Spartacus MTK LE (West); Csurgó (West); Ózdi Kohász SE (East); FC Hatvan (East); Jászberényi FC (East)

The 1988–89 Nemzeti Bajnokság II was the 91st season of Hungary's second-tier football league. The competition was contested by 32 teams, divided into Western and Eastern groups of 16 teams each. Csepel SC won the Western group, while Debreceni VSC finished first in the Eastern group; both clubs earned promotion to the Nemzeti Bajnokság I for the following season. At the end of the season, several teams were relegated to the third tier of Hungarian football.

== League table ==
=== Western group ===
| Pos | Team | Pld | W | PKW | PKL | L | GF | GA | GD | Pts | Promotion or relegation |
|---|---|---|---|---|---|---|---|---|---|---|---|
| 1 | Csepel SC | 30 | 18 | 3 | 2 | 7 | 52 | 31 | +21 | 62 | Promotion to Nemzeti Bajnokság I |
| 2 | Oroszlányi Bányász SK | 30 | 13 | 10 | 3 | 4 | 35 | 28 | +7 | 62 | |
| 3 | Nagykanizsai Olajbányász SE | 30 | 16 | 5 | 2 | 7 | 54 | 35 | +19 | 60 | |
| 4 | Volán SC | 30 | 14 | 3 | 2 | 11 | 45 | 35 | +10 | 52 (Note: 2 bonus points?) | |
| 5 | Komlói Bányász SK | 30 | 10 | 8 | 4 | 8 | 36 | 33 | +3 | 50 | |
| 6 | Budapesti VSC | 30 | 12 | 4 | 6 | 8 | 33 | 30 | +3 | 50 | |
| 7 | Keszthelyi Haladás SE | 30 | 10 | 7 | 1 | 12 | 27 | 27 | 0 | 45 | |
| 8 | Mohácsi TSZ SE | 30 | 11 | 1 | 9 | 9 | 35 | 30 | +5 | 44 | |
| 9 | Soproni SE | 30 | 9 | 7 | 2 | 12 | 37 | 41 | −4 | 43 | |
| 10 | Dorogi Bányász | 30 | 8 | 4 | 9 | 9 | 40 | 42 | −2 | 41 | |
| 11 | Szekszárdi Dózsa | 30 | 9 | 4 | 4 | 13 | 31 | 42 | −11 | 39 | |
| 12 | III. Kerületi TTVE | 30 | 10 | 3 | 2 | 15 | 27 | 40 | −13 | 38 | |
| 13 | Tapolca Bauxitbányász SE | 30 | 9 | 2 | 6 | 13 | 32 | 35 | −3 | 37 | |
| 14 | Kaposvári Rákóczi FC | 30 | 9 | 2 | 4 | 15 | 33 | 37 | −4 | 35 | Relegation to Nemzeti Bajnokság III |
| 15 | Erzsébeti SMTK | 30 | 8 | 3 | 5 | 14 | 38 | 48 | −10 | 35 | Relegation to Nemzeti Bajnokság III |
| 16 | Csurgói Spartacus | 30 | 7 | 1 | 6 | 16 | 30 | 51 | −21 | 29 | Relegation to Nemzeti Bajnokság III |

=== Eastern group ===
| Pos | Team | Pld | W | PKW | PKL | L | GF | GA | GD | Pts | Promotion or relegation |
|---|---|---|---|---|---|---|---|---|---|---|---|
| 1 | Debreceni MVSC | 30 | 20 | 4 | 2 | 4 | 54 | 18 | +36 | 70 | Promotion to Nemzeti Bajnokság I |
| 2 | Szeged SC | 30 | 17 | 5 | 1 | 7 | 40 | 21 | +19 | 62 | |
| 3 | Szarvasi Vasas Spartacus SE | 30 | 14 | 5 | 4 | 7 | 39 | 25 | +14 | 56 | |
| 4 | Hódgép-Metripond SE | 30 | 15 | 3 | 3 | 9 | 44 | 36 | +8 | 54 | |
| 5 | Debreceni Kinizsi SE | 30 | 11 | 7 | 4 | 8 | 39 | 30 | +9 | 51 | |
| 6 | Eger SE | 30 | 11 | 4 | 6 | 9 | 40 | 44 | −4 | 47 | |
| 7 | Szolnoki MÁV MTE | 30 | 10 | 4 | 6 | 10 | 45 | 45 | 0 | 44 | |
| 8 | Diósgyőri Vasgyárak TK | 30 | 10 | 5 | 4 | 11 | 30 | 35 | −5 | 44 | |
| 9 | Kazincbarcikai Vegyész SE | 30 | 9 | 7 | 3 | 11 | 33 | 43 | −10 | 44 | |
| 10 | Kecskeméti SC | 30 | 12 | 1 | 4 | 13 | 37 | 30 | +7 | 42 | |
| 11 | Nyíregyházi VSSC | 30 | 12 | 1 | 4 | 13 | 38 | 34 | +4 | 42 | |
| 12 | Debreceni Universitas SE | 30 | 10 | 4 | 4 | 12 | 30 | 35 | −5 | 42 | |
| 13 | Bajai SK | 30 | 9 | 3 | 5 | 13 | 32 | 47 | −15 | 38 | |
| 14 | Ózdi Kohász SE | 30 | 7 | 3 | 6 | 14 | 26 | 31 | −5 | 33 | Relegation to Nemzeti Bajnokság III |
| 15 | Hatvani KVSC | 30 | 5 | 4 | 4 | 17 | 20 | 44 | −24 | 27 | Relegation to Nemzeti Bajnokság III |
| 16 | Jászberényi Lehel SC | 30 | 4 | 4 | 4 | 18 | 26 | 55 | −29 | 24 | Relegation to Nemzeti Bajnokság III |

== See also ==
- 1988–89 Magyar Kupa
- 1988–89 Nemzeti Bajnokság I
