= Várpalotai Bányász SK =

Hungarian football club

- Full name: Várpalotai Bányász Sport Kör
- Founded: 1927
- Ground: Bányász Stadion
- League: Megyei Bajnokság I
- Website: https://vbsklsz.hu/
Home colours

Várpalotai Bányász Sport Kör is a professional football club based in Várpalota, Veszprém County, Hungary, that competes in the Megyei Bajnokság I, the fourth tier of Hungarian football.

== History ==
The club was founded in 1927 under the name Várpalota Union Athletic Association. Mihály Homoki became the association’s first president. That same fall, the team registered with the Western Transdanubia district of the Hungarian Youth Soccer Association (MIL), and soon after was promoted to Division II of the Western Transdanubia Soccer Association. However, it was not until nearly 10 years later, in 1936–37, that the team advanced to Division I. In the 1939–40 season, the Palota team was placed in the third division of the newly introduced National Championship, NB III.

The mine and its social organization, the “Jó Szerencsét Kör” (Good Luck Circle), played an important role in the life of the soccer club and its players. From 1946 onward, the team operated under the name Várpalota Workers’ Athletic Association. During the 1948–49 season, the outstanding coach Gedeon Lukács (formerly a coach for Italian teams and the champion Csepel) successfully led the team, which was promoted to NB II. The team won the championship with a 13-point lead and 136 goals scored!

VMTE, playing in green and white, hosted Fradi—whose lineup included Csanádi and Czibor, among others—and defeated them 6–4, as well as the Hungarian national team. The national team ultimately won 9–2 in Várpalota, but for the sake of accuracy, let’s list who played on that team: Henni, Rudas, Balogh II (Bagoly), Bozsik, Börzsei (Szücs), Lakat (Zakariás), Budai, Kocsis (Szusza), Deák, Puskás, and Czibor.

By 1952, the team was already competing under the name Várpalotai Bányász Sport Kör, and the club colors had changed to red and black. On May 15, 1963, the field—which remains the home of VBSK to this day and was equipped with, among other things, an electronic scoreboard—was inaugurated with a match against the Hungarian national team. Four years later, the team bid farewell to the third division, and Bányász, having been promoted to NB I/B, was already making plans for NB I. However, a stint in the top division never materialized; the mines were scaled back, and during the years of political transition, most of them were shut down. The same thing happened in Várpalota; as a result, the team began its decline and found itself in the third division in 1983, and nine years later, it was playing in the county’s first division.

== Name changes ==
- 1927 – 1942: Várpalotai Unió Testedző Egylet
- 1942 – 1945: Várpalotai Bányász SE
- 1945 – 1949: Várpalotai Munkás Testedző Egylet
- 1949 – 1951: Várpalotai Tárna
- 1951 – 1957: Várpalotai Bányász SK
- 1957 – 1957: Várpalotai Testedzők Egyesülete
- 1957 – 1957: Várpalotai Bányász TE
- 1957 – 2010: Várpalotai Bányász SK
- 2010 – 2013: Várpalotai Bányász Sport Kör
- 2013 – 2019: Várpalotai Bányász Sport Kör
- 2019 – 2021: ADA-BAU-Várpalotai Bányász Sport Kör
- 2021 – present: Várpalotai Bányász Sport Kör

== Honours ==
=== League ===
- Nemzeti Bajnokság III:
  - Winners (1): 1948–49

== Seasons ==
The table below shows the seasons of Várpalota Bányász SK.

| Season | Tier | Club's name | Position | Pts |
|---|---|---|---|---|
| 1930–31 | 3 | Várpalotai Unió TE | 4 / 8 | 13 |
| 1931–32 | 3 | Várpalotai Unió TE | 6 / 8 | 9 |
| 1932–33 | 3 | Várpalotai Unió TE | 2 / 7 | 20 |
| 1933–34 | 3 | Várpalotai Unió | 2 / 11 | 31 |
| 1934–35 | 3 | Várpalotai Unió | 2 / 11 | 36 |
| 1935–36 | 3 | Várpalotai Unió | 0 / 10 | |
| 1936–37 | 3 | Várpalotai Unió TE | 1 / 11 | 34 |
| 1937–38 | 2 | Várpalotai Unió TE | 10 / 14 | 23 |
| 1938–39 | 3 | Várpalotai Unió TE | 10 / 14 | 22 |
| 1939–40 | 3 | Várpalotai Unió TE | 13 / 14 | 17 |
| 1940–41 | 4 | Várpalotai Unió TE | 9 / 14 | 24 |
| 1941–42 | 4 | Várpalotai Unió TE | 2 / 14 | 34 |
| 1942–43 | 3 | Várpalotai Unió | 7 / 14 | 25 |
| 1943–44 | 3 | Várpalotai Bányász SE | 7 / 16 | 31 |
| 1944–45 | 2 | Várpalotai BSE | 11 / 16 | 6 |
| 1944–45 | 3 | Várpalotai Unió TE | 0 / 14 | |
| 1945–46 | 2 | Várpalotai MTE | 4 / 10 | 23 |
| 1946–47 | 3 | Várpalotai MTE | 7 / 12 | 21 |
| 1947–48 | 3 | Várpalotai MTE | 2 / 16 | 43 |
| 1948–49 | 3 | Várpalotai MTE | 1 / 16 | 53 |
| 1949–50 | 2 | Várpalotai Tárna | 15 / 16 | 21 |
| 1950 | 3 | Várpalotai Tárna | 3 / 16 | 23 |
| 1951 | 3 | Várpalotai Bányász SK | 1 / 14 | 43 |
| 1952 | 2 | Várpalotai Bányász SK | 5 / 18 | 39 |
| 1953 | 2 | Várpalotai Bányász SK | 7 / 16 | 31 |
| 1954 | 2 | Várpalotai Bányász SK | 6 / 16 | 33 |
| 1955 | 2 | Várpalotai Bányász SK | 15 / 16 | 22 |
| 1956 | 3 | Várpalotai Bányász SK | 5 / 14 | 37 |
| 1957 | 3 | Várpalotai Bányász SK | 3 / 10 | 25 |
| 1957–58 | 3 | Várpalotai Bányász SK | 6 / 16 | 33 |
| 1958–59 | 3 | Várpalotai Bányász SK | 8 / 16 | 33 |
| 1959–60 | 3 | Várpalotai Bányász SK | 4 / 17 | 35 |
| 1960–61 | 3 | Várpalotai Bányász SK | 6 / 16 | 34 |
| 1961–62 | 3 | Várpalotai Bányász SK | 10 / 16 | 27 |
| 1962–63 | 3 | Várpalotai Bányász SK | 5 / 16 | 38 |
| 1963 | 4 | Várpalotai Bányász SK | 6 / 16 | 18 |
| 1964 | 4 | Várpalotai Bányász SK | 1 / 17 | 41 |
| 1965 | 3 | Várpalotai Bányász SK | 2 / 18 | 43 |
| 1966 | 3 | Várpalotai Bányász SK | 1 / 18 | 51 |
| 1967 | 2 | Várpalotai Bányász SK | 9 / 18 | 33 |
| 1968 | 2 | Várpalotai Bányász SK | 11 / 18 | 33 |
| 1969 | 2 | Várpalotai Bányász SK | 6 / 18 | 37 |
| 1970 | 2 | Várpalotai Bányász SK | 9 / 9 | 8 |
| 1970–71 | 2 | Várpalotai Bányász SK | 11 / 18 | 36 |
| 1971–72 | 2 | Várpalotai Bányász SK | 11 / 18 | 32 |
| 1972–73 | 2 | Várpalotai Bányász SK | 8 / 18 | 35 |
| 1973–74 | 2 | Várpalotai Bányász SK | 18 / 18 | 21 |
| 1974–75 | 2 | Várpalotai Bányász SK | 11 / 20 | 37 |
| 1975–76 | 2 | Várpalotai Bányász SK | 15 / 20 | 33 |
| 1976–77 | 2 | Várpalotai Bányász SK | 14 / 20 | 33 |
| 1977–78 | 2 | Várpalotai Bányász SK | 19 / 20 | 24 |
| 1978–79 | 3 | Várpalotai Bányász SK | 1 / 16 | 49 |
| 1979–80 | 2 | Várpalotai Bányász SK | 15 / 20 | 33 |
| 1980–81 | 2 | Várpalotai Bányász SK | 15 / 20 | 34 |
| 1981–82 | 2 | Várpalotai Bányász SK | 15 / 16 | 15 |
| 1982–83 | 3 | Várpalotai Bányász SK | 10 / 18 | 33 |
| 1983–84 | 3 | Várpalotai Bányász SK | 17 / 18 | 23 |
| 1984–85 | 4 | Várpalotai Bányász SK | 1 / 16 | 54 |
| 1985–86 | 3 | Várpalotai Bányász SK | 9 / 18 | 33 |
| 1986–87 | 3 | Várpalotai Bányász SK | 11 / 18 | 32 |
| 1987–88 | 3 | Várpalotai Bányász SK | 7 / 18 | 33 |
| 1988–89 | 3 | Várpalotai Bányász SK | 4 / 16 | 50 |
| 1989–90 | 3 | Várpalotai Bányász SK | 12 / 16 | 26 |
| 1990–91 | 3 | Várpalotai Bányász SK | 10 / 16 | 27 |
| 1991–92 | 3 | Várpalotai Bányász SK | 15 / 16 | 17 |
| 1992–93 | 4 | Várpalotai Bányász SK | 2 / 16 | 48 |
| 1993–94 | 4 | Várpalotai Bányász SK | 2 / 16 | 48 |
| 1994–95 | 4 | Várpalotai Bányász SK | 3 / 16 | 56 |
| 1995–96 | 4 | Várpalotai Bányász SK | 7 / 18 | 59 |
| 1996–97 | 4 | Várpalotai Bányász SK | 3 / 18 | 64 |
| 1997–98 | 5 | Várpalotai Bányász SK | 7 / 16 | 52 |
| 1998–99 | 5 | Várpalotai Bányász SK | 10 / 16 | 38 |
| 1999–00 | 5 | Várpalotai Bányász SK | 9 / 16 | 47 |
| 2000–01 | 5 | Várpalotai Bányász SK | 7 / 16 | 38 |
| 2001–02 | 5 | Várpalotai Bányász SK | 7 / 16 | 42 |
| 2002–03 | 5 | Várpalotai Bányász SK | 13 / 17 | 35 |
| 2003–04 | 5 | Várpalotai Bányász SK | 2 / 16 | 59 |
| 2004–05 | 5 | Várpalotai Bányász SK | 6 / 16 | 53 |
| 2005–06 | 4 | Várpalotai Bányász SK | 4 / 16 | 50 |
| 2006–07 | 4 | Várpalotai Bányász SK | 7 / 16 | 42 |
| 2007–08 | 4 | Várpalotai Bányász SK | 7 / 16 | 42 |
| 2008–09 | 4 | Várpalotai Bányász SK | 1 / 16 | 74 |
| 2009–10 | 3 | Várpalotai Bányász SK | 14 / 14 | 7 |
| 2010–11 | 3 | morello.hu-Várpalotai BSK | 15 / 16 | 14 |
| 2011–12 | 3 | Morello.hu-Várpalotai BSK | 14 / 15 | 19 |
| 2012–13 | 4 | Várpalotai BSK | 12 / 16 | 34 |
| 2013–14 | 4 | Várpalotai BSK | 12 / 16 | 30 |
| 2014–15 | 4 | Várpalotai Bányász SK | 12 / 16 | 34 |
| 2015–16 | 4 | Várpalotai Bányász SK | 7 / 18 | 51 |
| 2016–17 | 4 | Várpalotai Bányász SK | 6 / 16 | 50 |
| 2017–18 | 4 | Várpalotai Bányász SK | 6 / 16 | 44 |
| 2018–19 | 4 | Várpalotai Bányász SK | 11 / 16 | 31 |
| 2019–20 | 4 | ADA-BAU-Várpalotai Bányász SK | 8 / 16 | 24 |
| 2020–21 | 4 | ADA-BAU-Várpalotai Bányász SK | 12 / 15 | 21 |
| 2021–22 | 4 | Várpalotai Bányász SK | 13 / 16 | 28 |
| 2022–23 | 4 | Várpalotai Bányász SK | 11 / 16 | 34 |
| 2023–24 | 4 | Várpalotai Bányász SK | 16 / 16 | 17 |
| 2024–25 | 4 | Várpalotai Bányász SK | 10 / 15 | 27 |
| 2025–26 | 4 | Várpalotai Bányász SK | 6 / 13 | 40 |
