= FC Ajka =

Hungarian football club

Ajka
- Full name: Futball Club Ajka
- Founded: 1923; 103 years ago
- Ground: Városi Stadion; Ajka, Hungary
- Capacity: 5,000
- Chairman: Gyula Geri
- Manager: Gyula Jeney
- League: NB II
- 2025–26: NB II, 12th of 18
- Website: https://fcajka.hu/
| Home colours | Away colours |

FC Ajka is a Hungarian football club located in Ajka, Hungary. It currently plays in Hungarian National Championship II. The team's colors are white and green.

== History ==
FC Ajka's predecessor, Ajkai Sportegyesület (ASE), was founded in 1923. The club was primarily made up of young people working in factories who started playing soccer.

In the early days, ASE did not have its own pitch, so they rented one from the glass factory.

The team took its first steps in the county, then from 1948 they played in Nemzeti Bajnokság III. That year, the new sports complex was inaugurated on Sport Street, where the team still plays today.

Thanks to its many successes, the team quickly gained a large fan base. In a town with a population of 9,000 at the time, 2,000 people attended the matches.

In the 1950s, the team moved between the Megyei Bajnokság I and Nemzeti Bajnokság III.

The year 1968 brought significant changes in the life of the team. The Timföldgyár és Alumínium kohó (Aluminium Smelter) took over the team, which also resulted in a name change. The team continued to play under the name Ajkai Alumínium SK. All this brought dynamic development. The following year, the team won the championship, achieving a unique result. They won the championship with a huge 12-point lead.

From 1970, the club played continuously for nine seasons in Nemzeti Bajnokság III. Under the coaching of József Gróf, Rezső Lipták, and then Lajos Csabai, Alumínium developed into a stable mid-table team and then a top team. Players in the mid-70s were Goda (Nagylaki)-Kovács, Varró, Dalnoki, Zsidó, Duralla, György, Németh A., Nemes, Brezánszky, Haraszti, Turi, Király, Csikhon, Nagy, Halter.

In 1977-78 season, the team finished in an excellent second place, earning them a spot in Nemzeti Bajnokság II under the leadership of coach György Magyar. With the exception of the 1979-80 Nemzeti Bajnokság II season, when they finished in fourth place, the team was a stable member of the middle of the pack under the leadership of Ferenc Szigeti and then László Dalnoki. During this period, the following players were on the team: Horváth, Bujtor, Hollenczer, Czibik, Haraszti, Kocsis, Gőcze Turi, Menyhárt, Vajda, and Udvardi.

After being relegated in 1982, they spent four seasons in the third division. At that time, the coaches were Gyula Halter, Rezső Lipták, László Baki, and Róbert Glázer.

In 1987, another name change took place. The new name was Ajka Hungalu SK.

In 1987, under the leadership of Miklós Szőke, the team managed to get promoted again in the qualifying matches. Unfortunately, the team was unable to take root in the higher division, so it fluctuated between the second and third divisions. In 1988-89, it was promoted with Rezső Szabó, and the following year, after a change of coach, it managed to stay up with László Somodi, but in 1991, it was relegated again. In 1992, the team was promoted with László Dalnoki, in 1993 with Dalnoki, and then with László Csörnyei, who replaced him, the team was relegated.

However, the history of Hungalu SK only lasted until 1993. At that time, the team was relegated from Nemzeti Bajnokság II and the association dissolved its football department.

The city leadership was willing to help if Hungalu merged with Ajkai Bányász, which had been dissolved that same year. With no other option available, the merger went ahead. In August 1993, Ajkai Labdarúgó Club was founded. Everyone hoped that after 40 years of hostility, the merger would bring results. Unfortunately, this was not the case. Many players left ALC, which was relegated from the Bakony group. Thus, after falling into the county championship, the city found itself without a team in the national championship for the first time since 1962.

Between 1994 and 1998, the team, which had undergone another name change and was now called Ajkai SE, competed in the county championship, mainly with young players from Ajka. Attila Kovács, Géza Czibik, and then Attila Kovács again were the coaches. In 1997-98, under the leadership of János Szécsi, the team became undefeated champions in the Veszprém County First Division. After promotion to Nemzeti Bajnokság III, ASE finished fourth in the fourth division under the leadership of József Fördős with the following players: Grőber I., Garai, Nagy P., Ritter, Csörnyei L., Orbán T., Kasler, Gersics, Szőllősi, Rózsás, Csörnyei Z., Horváth L., Király Z., Pék, Bőke, Márton, Kiss, Dragodán, Somlai, Németi, Zsidó, Kozma, Korpos, Vasáros, and Németh K.

The following year, they achieved a valuable second place behind Pápa.

In the fall of 2000, under the leadership of János Szécsi, they won the qualifying championship and qualified for the Nemzeti Bajnokság II.

In the summer of 2001, the football department split from Ajka SE and continued to operate independently under the name FC Ajka. Attila Kovács was in charge of training in Nemzeti Bajnokság II. The player roster also underwent significant changes. Despite this, FC Ajka was unable to gain a foothold in the higher division.

In the 2002-03 Nemzeti Bajnokság III season, there were three coaches: Attila Kovács, Mihály Nagy, Péter Jákli. After finishing fourth in the fall, changes were made on the bench after the second round in the spring. At the end of the championship, the team climbed to third place.

In 2003-04 season, with a weakened squad, the team achieved its minimum goal of 5th place, still under the leadership of Péter Jákli.

The following year, the clear goal was to win the championship, which they managed to do. FC Ajka finished first, undefeated and with a 19-point lead, and then defeated former NB-II team Veszprém in the qualifiers to return to Nemzeti Bajnokság II. 2,000 fans celebrated in the stands.

Then the usual Ajka story continued. That is, after one year, relegation followed again. At the beginning of preparations for the spring season, Péter Jákli was replaced on the bench by the experienced István Mihalecz. However, he was also unable to keep the team in the league.

In the summer of 2006, FC Ajka strengthened its squad with several experienced players in the hope of winning another championship title. Breaking the "record" set two years earlier, they finished at the top of the NB-III Bakony group with a 20-point lead. Péter Jákli, then Imre Szabó in the spring. The members of the championship team: Csepregi, Varga T. Zsidó, Pálfi, Márton, Szőllőskei, Garai, Pákai, Csörnyei Z. Hauser, Giron, Balla, Badics, Cserna, Kalcsó, Kovács G. Czafit, Cseke, Purt, Varga I. Pothárn, Búzási, Fehér K. Grőber Á.

In 2007, the team were promoted to Nemzeti Bajnokág II.

The team managed to achieve its goal. Led by Imre Szabó, they got off to a great start to the season, securing 9 points in their first three matches and laying the foundations for their subsequent survival. Unfortunately, this was followed by five defeats, but by the end of the autumn season, the team had managed to pull itself together and was eight points clear of the relegation zone going into the spring. The team's performance continued to fluctuate in the second half of the season, but they never once found themselves in the relegation zone. Thus, after many years, the rollercoaster ride came to an end, and in 2008, FC Ajka was able to prepare for the second division once again.

The 2007-08 Nemzeti Bajnokság II team included Tamás Szép, Ádám Grőber, Tamás Giron, Bálint Badics, Zoltán Béres, Szabolcs Pothárn, Gábor Kovács, László Szilágyi, Balázs Fonnyadt, Zoltán Csörnyei, István Varga, Kornél Fehér, Péter Szöllőskei, Gergő Pákai, Zsolt Gunther, József Németh, Attila Lakatos, Gábor Búzási, Tibor Purt. The coaches were Imre Szabó, Péter Jákli, and Sándor Dávid. After the last league match, Imre Szabó announced that he would not continue his work in Ajka.

The revamped and strengthened squad began the 2008-2009 league season under the leadership of Tamás Horváth. The team earned 7 points in the first 3 rounds against Gyirmót, Pápa, and Tatabánya. However, in the next 4 rounds, the team only managed to draw once.

After this, a new coach was hired. Tamás Horváth was replaced on the bench by Tamás Artner, with whom FC Ajka finished the autumn season in ninth place. The team found success in the Spring, remaining unbeaten in 12 matches after the third round and winning the last five league games to finish the championship in sixth place.

The 2008-2009 NB-II team: Tibor Jánosa, Ádám Grőber, Bálint Badics, Péter Pávlicz, Szabolcs Pothárn, Gábor Subicz, Gergő Pákai, Ádám Hornyák, Kornél Fehér, András Kaj, Péter Szőllőskei, János Imre, Levente Szabó, Attila Manganelli, Zsolt Gunther, Róbert Gyűrűsi, Zoltán Csörnyei, Péter Mihalecz, Gábor Hujber, Gábor Kovács, Arnold Bakos.

Coach: Tamás Artner. Field coach: Péter Jákli. Goalkeeper coach: Sándor Dávid.

FC Ajka started the next season with the same staff, signing one experienced player (László Hegyi) and several young players (Ádám Horváth, Bálint Gaál, Norbert Major).

The board set a target of 4th-8th place for the team, which it confidently achieved. (Meanwhile, including the previous championship, it went undefeated in 16 league matches.) In the fall, it was in 6th place with 24 points.

After a calm winter preparation, the spring season was similarly successful. We scored 23 points. The total of 47 points meant 4th place in the league table.

Péter Mihalecz became the top scorer in the NB-II Western group with 19 goals.

Those who achieved this result in the 2009-2010 season: Tibor Jánosa, Ádám Grőber, Szabolcs Pothárn, Gábor Subicz, Gergő Pákai, András Kaj, László Hegyi, Levente Szabó, Attila Manganelli, Zsolt Gunther, Róbert Gyűrűsi, Zoltán Csörnyei, Péter Mihalecz, Ádám Horváth, Bálint Gaál, Norbert Major, Gábor Kovács, Arnold Bakos.

Coach: Tamás Artner. Field coach: Péter Jákli. Goalkeeper coach: Sándor Dávid.

The 2010-2011 season saw a continuation of the excellent performances of previous years.

The coaching staff remained unchanged. As in previous years, there were only minor changes in the team's lineup. András Kaj, Zoltán Csörnyei, and Arnold Bakos left the team. Since his return in 1998, Zoltán Csörnyei ended his career at FC Ajka as the team's most successful player, with only minor interruptions, but he remained with the club as a youth coach.

Péter Péter arrived from Zalaegerszeg, Norbert Páli from Hévíz, Krisztián Kottán from Pécs, Márk Sallér from Siófok, and Márton Balogh and Balázs Pavlitzky from our own youth academy.

As in previous years, the goal was to finish in 4th-8th place.

The team performed well throughout the fall, earning 25 points, and thus entered the spring season in 5th place, where it earned 21 points, finishing the championship in 6th place with 46 points, 13 wins, 7 draws, and 10 losses.

Following the tradition of previous years, Péter Mihalecz once again won the title of top scorer in the Western group with 19 goals!

2011-2012: The core of the team continued to play together, but there were significant changes in the squad. Ádám Grőber, Norbert Páli, Krisztián Kottán, László Hegyi, and Róbert Gyűrűsi, while Bálint Sásdi, Roland Szalai, József Pados, Zsolt Kovács from Szombathely, Attila Tróbert, and Ádám Vittman from Zalaegerszeg joined the team.

In the winter, there was a change in the head coach position. Tamás Artner returned to Szombathely to become the head coach of Haladás, which plays in NB-I. From September 2008 to the end of 2011, he worked extremely successfully in Ajka for three and a half years. Under his leadership, FC Ajka enjoyed one of the most successful periods in its history. Based on the decision of the board, Péter Jákli, the previous assistant coach, continued his work at the helm of the team. There were minor changes in the squad. József Pados and Ádám Vittman left, while Roland Domján arrived from Pápa and Attila Horváth from Siófok.

Spring did not start well. The team had one win, one draw, and three losses. Then the team's performance improved, and by the end of the championship, it had achieved the expected results. In the spring, it scored 24 points and once again took 4th place with 50 points!

The players who achieved this result in the 2011-2012 season were: Tibor Jánosa, Bálint Sásdi, Márton Balogh, Márk Sallér, Gábor Subicz, Gergő Pákai, Levente Szabó, Zsolt Gunther, Péter Mihalecz, Bálint Gaál, Norbert Major, Péter Péter, Szabolcs Kovács, Zsolt Kovács, Balázs Pavlitzky, Roland Szalai, Attila Tróbert, Attila Horváth, Roland Domján.

In the 8th round of the 2018–19 Magyar Kupa season Ajka eliminated 2018–19 Nemzeti Bajnokság I club MTK Budapest. However, in the round of 16th Ajka were eliminated by Debreceni VSC on 3–4 aggregate.

On 13 February 2026, former resident Gyula Geri passed away.

== Honours ==
- Nemzeti Bajnokság III:
  - Winners (6): 1986–87, 1988–89, 1990–91, 1991–92, 2006–07, 2018–19

== Players ==
=== Current squad ===
As of 12 February 2026

Note: Flags indicate national team as defined under FIFA eligibility rules; some limited exceptions apply. Players may hold more than one non-FIFA nationality.

| No. | Pos. | Nation | Player |
|---|---|---|---|
| 5 | DF | HUN | Zoltán Kenderes |
| 6 | MF | HUN | Krisztián Kirchner |
| 7 | FW | HUN | Gábor Makrai (on loan from Kazincbarcika) |
| 8 | MF | HUN | Barnabás Mohos |
| 9 | FW | HUN | Máté Szabó (on loan from Kazincbarcika) |
| 10 | FW | HUN | Dominik Cipf |
| 11 | MF | HUN | Áron Kopácsi |
| 13 | MF | HUN | Bence Csanádi |
| 14 | DF | HUN | Nikolasz Kovács |
| 17 | FW | HUN | Tamás Tóth (on loan from Fehérvár) |
| 18 | FW | HUN | Viktor Sejben |
| 19 | MF | HUN | Zoltán Csizmadia |
| 20 | DF | HUN | Gergely Tóth |
| 22 | GK | HUN | Mátyás Király |

| No. | Pos. | Nation | Player |
|---|---|---|---|
| 24 | DF | HUN | Zsombor Csörnyei |
| 29 | DF | HUN | Benjámin Bacsa |
| 30 | FW | HUN | Levente Doncsecz |
| 31 | GK | HUN | Dániel Horváth |
| 32 | FW | HUN | Richárd Jelena (on loan from Kozármisleny) |
| 34 | DF | HUN | Zsolt Tar |
| 38 | DF | HUN | Kristóf Lichy (on loan from Debrecen II) |
| 44 | DF | HUN | Barnabás Mészáros |
| 63 | FW | HUN | István Katona |
| 68 | DF | HUN | Nikolasz Nagy |
| 71 | FW | HUN | Dominik Csóka |
| 80 | DF | HUN | Máté Papp |
| 97 | GK | HUN | István Szabados |
| 99 | DF | HUN | Zétény Garai |

=== Out on loan ===
Note: Flags indicate national team as defined under FIFA eligibility rules; some limited exceptions apply. Players may hold more than one non-FIFA nationality.

| No. | Pos. | Nation | Player |
|---|---|---|---|
| 2 | DF | HUN | Zalán Gregor (at Pécs until 30 June 2026) |

== Seasons ==
=== League positions ===
As of 19 July 2025

- In 1997–98 the fifth tier league called Reg.I.
- Between 1998–99 and 1999–2000, 2002–03 and 2004–05 and the fourth tier league called NB III.
- Between 2000–01 and 2001–02 the third tier league called NB II.

=== List of seasons ===
As of 15 October 2026.

| Season | Tier | Club's name | Position | Pts |
|---|---|---|---|---|
| 1951 | 3 | Ajka Vasas | 5 / 14 | 29 |
| 1952 | 3 | Ajkai Vasas | 3 / 14 | 34 |
| 1953 | 3 | Ajkai Szikra | 6 / 16 | 33 |
| 1954 | 3 | Ajkai Szikra | 5 / 16 | 41 |
| 1955 | 3 | Ajkai Szikra | 7 / 16 | 29 |
| 1956 | 3 | Ajkai Szikra | 8 / 14 | 19 |
| 1964 | 5 | Ajkai SE | 7 / 18 | 29 |
| 1965 | 5 | Ajkai SE | 12 / 18 | 27 |
| 1966 | 5 | Ajkai SE | 6 / 15 | 32 |
| 1967 | 5 | Ajkai SE | 3 / 16 | 32 |
| 1968 | 5 | Ajkai Aluminium SK | 2 / 14 | 38 |
| 1969 | 5 | Ajkai Aluminium SK | 1 / 14 | 42 |
| 1945–46 | 3 | Ajkai SE | 2 / 8 | |
| 1946–47 | 4 | Ajkai SE | 10 / 14 | 24 |
| 1947–48 | 4 | Ajkai SE | 4 / 12 | 28 |
| 1948–49 | 3 | Ajkai SE | 11 / 16 | 25 |
| 1949–50 | 3 | Ajkai Dolgozók SE | 7 / 16 | 31 |
| 1950 | 3 | Ajkai DSE | 16 / 17 | 7 |
| 1957 | 3 | Ajkai SE | 5 / 10 | 21 |
| 1957–58 | 4 | Ajkai SE | 1 / 18 | 57 |
| 1958–59 | 4 | Ajkai SE | 8 / 16 | 29 |
| 1959–60 | 4 | Ajkai SE | 4 / 17 | 37 |
| 1960–61 | 4 | Ajkai SE | 2 / 18 | 43 |
| 1961–62 | 4 | Ajkai SE | 3 / 16 | 42 |
| 1962–63 | 4 | Ajkai SE | 2 / 16 | 47 |
| 1963 | 5 | Ajkai SE | 8 / 18 | 20 |
| 1970 | 4 | Ajkai Alumínium SK | 12 / 16 | 14 |
| 1970–71 | 4 | Ajkai Alumínium SK | 9 / 16 | 29 |
| 1971–72 | 4 | Ajkai Alumínium | 4 / 16 | 35 |
| 1972–73 | 4 | Ajkai Alumínium | 3 / 16 | 47 |
| 1973–74 | 4 | Ajkai Alumínium SK | 1 / 16 | 47 |
| 1974–75 | 3 | Ajkai Alumínium SK | 11 / 20 | 35 |
| 1975–76 | 3 | Ajkai Alumínium SK | 3 / 19 | 44 |
| 1976–77 | 3 | Ajkai Alumínium SK | 9 / 20 | 42 |
| 1977–78 | 3 | Ajkai Alumínium | 2 / 20 | 49 |
| 1978–79 | 2 | Ajkai Alumínium | 13 / 20 | 35 |
| 1979–80 | 2 | Ajkai Aluminium SK | 4 / 20 | 45 |
| 1980–81 | 2 | Ajkai Aluminium SK | 14 / 20 | 35 |
| 1981–82 | 2 | Ajkai Aluminium SK | 12 / 16 | 22 |
| 1982–83 | 3 | Ajkai Alumínium SK | 8 / 18 | 35 |
| 1983–84 | 3 | Ajkai Aluminium SK | 6 / 18 | 37 |
| 1984–85 | 3 | Ajkai Aluminium | 8 / 18 | 34 |
| 1985–86 | 3 | Ajkai Alumínium SK | 4 / 18 | 44 |
| 1986–87 | 3 | Ajkai Hungalu SK | 1 / 18 | 56 |
| 1987–88 | 2 | Ajkai Hungalu SC | 18 / 20 | 31 |
| 1988–89 | 3 | Ajkai Hungalu | 1 / 16 | 71 |
| 1989–90 | 2 | Ajkai Hungalu SK | 12 / 16 | 33 |
| 1990–91 | 2 | Ajka Hungalu SK | 16 / 16 | 21 |
| 1991–92 | 3 | Ajkai Hungalu | 1 / 16 | 49 |
| 1992–93 | 2 | Ajka Hungalu SE | 16 / 16 | 14 |
| 1993–94 | 3 | Ajkai LC | 16 / 16 | 10 |
| 1994–95 | 4 | Ajkai SE | 5 / 16 | 51 |
| 1995–96 | 4 | Ajkai SE | 6 / 18 | 60 |
| 1996–97 | 4 | Ajka SE | 2 / 18 | 64 |
| 1997–98 | 5 | Ajka SE | 1 / 16 | 82 |
| 1998–99 | 4 | Ajkai SE | 4 / 16 | 51 |
| 1999–00 | 4 | Ajkai SE | 2 / 16 | 63 |
| 2000 | 3 | Ajka SE | 1 / 8 | 34 |
| 2000–01 | 3 | Ajka SE | 11 / 12 | 19 |
| 2001–02 | 3 | FC Ajka | 12 / 13 | 21 |
| 2002–03 | 4 | FC Ajka | 3 / 16 | 56 |
| 2003–04 | 4 | Ajka | 5 / 16 | 52 |
| 2004–05 | 4 | Ajka FC | 1 / 14 | 68 |
| 2005–06 | 2 | Ajka FC | 16 / 16 | 25 |
| 2006–07 | 3 | FC Ajka | 1 / 14 | 71 |
| 2007–08 | 2 | FC Ajka | 12 / 16 | 33 |
| 2008–09 | 2 | FC Ajka | 6 / 16 | 49 |
| 2009–10 | 2 | FC Ajka | 4 / 15 | 47 |
| 2010–11 | 2 | FC Ajka | 6 / 16 | 46 |
| 2011–12 | 2 | FC Ajka | 4 / 16 | 50 |
| 2012–13 | 2 | FC Ajka | 5 / 16 | 51 |
| 2013–14 | 2 | FC Ajka | 7 / 16 | 43 |
| 2014–15 | 2 | FC Ajka | 11 / 16 | 32 |
| 2015–16 | 2 | FC Ajka | 16 / 16 | 20 |
| 2016–17 | 3 | FC Ajka | 4 / 18 | 59 |
| 2017–18 | 3 | FC Ajka | 2 / 16 | 64 |
| 2018–19 | 3 | FC Ajka | 1 / 16 | 71 |
| 2019–20 | 2 | FC Ajka | 9 / 20 | 35 |
| 2020–21 | 2 | FC Ajka | 5 / 20 | 62 |
| 2021–22 | 2 | FC Ajka | 9 / 20 | 51 |
| 2022–23 | 2 | FC Ajka | 3 / 20 | 68 |
| 2023–24 | 2 | FC Ajka | 11 / 18 | 43 |
| 2024–25 | 2 | FC Ajka | 13 / 16 | 35 |
| 2025–26 | 2 | FC Ajka | 12 / 16 | 33 |
