= Debreceni Kinizsi SE =

Hungarian football club

- Full name: Debreceni Kinizsi Sportegyesület
- Founded: 1928
- Dissolved: 2001
Home colours

Debreceni Kinizsi SE is a defunct professional football club based in Debrecen, Hajdú–Bihar County, Hungary.

== History ==
Debreceni Kinizsi SE won the 1986–87 Nemzeti Bajnokság III season; however, they did not gain promotion to the second division since they lost the promotion playoff match against Kazincbarcikai Vegyész SE and Kecskeméti SC. In the 1987–88 Nemzeti Bajnokság III, Kinizsi finished in the third position and gained a place in the promotion playoffs. Kinizsi finihed in the first position and gained promotion to the second division.

== Name changes ==
- MOVE Debreceni Dohánygyári Dal és Sport Egyesület: ? – ?
- Debreceni Dohánygyári FC: ? – 1935
- Debreceni Dohánygyári SE: 1935 – 1948
- Debreceni Lendület SE: 1948 – 1950
- Debreceni ÉDOSz: 1950 – 1951
- 1950: fusion with Debreceni Barnevál SE and Kinizsi function as the second team of Barnevál SE
- Debreceni Kinizsi SK: 1951 – ?
- Debreceni Kinizsi SE: ? – 2000
- Debreceni FSE: 2000 – 2001

== Honours ==
=== League ===
- Nemzeti Bajnokság III:
  - Winners (1): 1986–87

== Seasons ==
The table below shows Debreceni Kinizsi SE's seasons.

Season	Tier	Club's name	Position	Pts
1933–34	3	Debreceni Dohánygyár FC	3 / 11	23
1934–35	3	Debreceni Dohánygyári FC	2 / 8	22
1935–36	2	Debreceni Dohánygyári SE	14 / 14	6
1938–39	4	Debreceni Dohánygyári SE	6 / 9	15
1939–40	3	Debreceni Dohánygyári SE	7 / 11	18
1946–47	4	Debreceni Dohánygyári SE	1 / 12	31
1947–48	3	Debreceni Dohánygyári SE	10 / 13	21
1948–49	3	Debreceni Lendület ESE	8 / 16	28
1949–50	3	Debreceni Lendület SE	8 / 16	29
1950	3	Debreceni ÉDOSz	8 / 17	15
1951	3	Debreceni Kinizsi	8 / 14	28
1952	3	Debreceni Kinizsi	9 / 14	24
1953	3	Debreceni Kinizsi	6 / 12	24
1954	3	Debreceni Kinizsi	10 / 16	25
1955	3	Debreceni Kinizsi	5 / 16	37
1956	3	Debreceni Kinizsi	6 / 16	36
1957	3	Debreceni Kinizsi	1 / 6	15
1957–58	3	Debreceni Kinizsi	5 / 16	33
1958–59	3	Debreceni Kinizsi	8 / 16	30
1959–60	3	Debreceni Kinizsi	5 / 17	33
1960–61	3	Debreceni Kinizsi	6 / 16	32
1961–62	3	Debreceni Kinizsi	14 / 16	26
1962–63	4	Debreceni Kinizsi	2 / 18	47
1963	5	Debreceni Kinizsi	3 / 18	24
1964	5	Debreceni Kinizsi	1 / 16	51
1965	4	Debreceni Kinizsi	2 / 16	40
1966	4	Debreceni Kinizsi	7 / 16	30
1967	4	Debreceni Kinizsi	10 / 16	28
1968	4	Debreceni Kinizsi	9 / 16	30
1969	4	Debreceni Kinizsi	15 / 16	21
1970	5	Debreceni Kinizsi	1 / 8	21
1970–71	5	Debreceni Kinizsi	3 / 16	39
1971–72	5	Debreceni Kinizsi	3 / 16	36
1972–73	5	Debreceni Kinizsi	1 / 16	39
1973–74	4	Debreceni Kinizsi	11 / 16	18
1974–75	4	Debreceni Kinizsi	2 / 16	44
1975–76	4	Debreceni Kinizsi	2 / 17	57
1976–77	4	Debreceni Kinizsi SK	2 / 18	54
1977–78	4	Debreceni Kinizsi SE	1 / 18	60
1978–79	3	Debreceni Kinizsi	1 / 18	51
1979–80	2	Debreceni Kinizsi SK	15 / 20	36
1980–81	2	Debreceni Kinizsi	9 / 20	40
1981–82	2	Debreceni Kinizsi	4 / 16	36
1982–83	2	Debreceni Kinizsi SK	14 / 20	36
1983–84	2	Debreceni Kinizsi SK	10 / 20	37
1984–85	2	Debreceni Kinizsi	6 / 20	43
1985–86	2	Debreceni Kinizsi	19 / 20	28
1986–87	3	Debreceni Kinizsi	1 / 16	48
1987–88	3	Debreceni Kinizsi	3 / 16	43
1988–89	2	Debreceni Kinizsi	5 / 16	51
1989–90	2	Debreceni Kinizsi SE	14 / 16	37
1990–91	3	Debreceni Kinizsi	8 / 16	34
1991–92	3	Debreceni Kinizsi	15 / 16	14
1992–93	4	Debreceni Kinizsi	7 / 16	30
1993–94	4	Debreceni Kinizsi	5 / 18	43
1994–95	4	Debreceni Kinizsi SE	8 / 17	39
1995–96	4	Debreceni Kinizsi SE	5 / 16	52
1996–97	4	Debreceni Kinizsi	13 / 18	32
1997–98	5	Debreceni Kinizsi	14 / 16	28
1998–99	5	Debreceni Kinizsi	3 / 16	59
1999–2000	5	Debreceni Kinizsi	1 / 16	70
2000	3	Debreceni FSE	7 / 8	-3
2000–01	4	Debreceni FSE	11 / 11	
