= 1987–88 Nemzeti Bajnokság I =

Nemzeti Bajnokság I
- Season: 1987–88
- Champions: Budapest Honvéd
- Relegated: Debreceni MVSC; Kaposvár
- European Cup: Budapest Honvéd
- UEFA Cup: Tatabánya; Újpesti Dózsa
- Cup Winners' Cup: Békéscsaba
- Matches: 240
- Goals: 621 (2.59 per match)
- Top goalscorer: Béla Melis (19)

Statistics of Nemzeti Bajnokság I for the 1987–88 season.

== Overview ==
It was contested by 16 teams, and Budapest Honvéd FC won the championship under headcoach Bertalan Bicskei. The 19th district team went undefeated at home throughout the entire campaign, only conceding 2 goals at the Bozsik Stadion. In March Tatabánya defeated Honvéd 1–0 at the Bányász (miner) Stadion, blowing the title-race wide open. Tatabánya would win 5 out of their next 7 encounters, but a 4-week winless streak at the end of the season destroyed their momentum. Honvéd confirmed their championship status on the 1st of June, obliterating Kaposvár Rákóczi 5-1. Kálmán Kovács scored four goals during the game.

== Match-fixing Scandal ==
In October 1988, news emerged of suspicious game results regarding the 1987/88 season. This was the second match-fixing related scandal in the Hungarian top-flight, the first one having happened in 1984. The legitimacy of the results of some teams having to fight relegation, such as that of Debreceni VSC, Fehérvár and Zalaegerszeg have been called into question.

47 people were called in to questioning about DVSC's results. Although no serious prison sentences were given out to any of the players placed under suspicion, the scandal still casts a large shadow over the perception of football and the fairness of it in the country in the 1980s.

== League standings ==
Pos	Team	Pld	W	D	L	GF	GA	GD	Pts	Qualification or relegation
1	Budapest Honvéd (C)	30	17	7	6	48	23	+25	41	Qualification for European Cup first round
2	Tatabánya	30	13	11	6	58	35	+23	37	Qualification for UEFA Cup first round
3	Újpesti Dózsa	30	12	13	5	48	29	+19	37	Qualification for UEFA Cup first round
4	Győr	30	14	7	9	49	43	+6	35	
5	Ferencváros	30	12	9	9	47	32	+15	33	
6	MTK-VM	30	14	4	12	53	50	+3	32	
7	Haladás	30	9	13	8	39	37	+2	31	
8	Pécs	30	11	9	10	31	34	−3	31	
9	Vasas	30	9	11	10	33	37	−4	29	
10	Váci Izzó	30	9	10	11	34	34	0	28	
11	Videoton	30	6	15	9	28	32	−4	27	
12	Siofoki Bányász	30	9	9	12	39	50	−11	27	
13	Békéscsaba	30	8	11	11	30	42	−12	27	Qualification for Cup Winners' Cup first round
14	Zalaegerszeg	30	7	11	12	26	32	−6	25	
15	Debreceni MVSC (R)	30	8	7	15	33	48	−15	23	Relegation to Nemzeti Bajnokság II
16	Kaposvár (R)	30	4	9	17	25	63	−38	17	Relegation to Nemzeti Bajnokság II

Source: rsssf.com
(C) Champions; (R) Relegated

== Results ==
Home \ Away	BÉK	DEB	FTC	GYŐ	HAL	HON	KAP	MTK	PÉC	SIÓ	TAT	ÚJP	VAS	VÁC	VID	ZTE
Békéscsaba		1–1	1–1	2–0	1–1	1–0	2–1	0–1	1–0	3–2	0–5	2–1	0–1	3–0	1–1	0–0
Debreceni MVSC	0–2		2–2	1–3	1–1	1–2	0–1	2–1	1–1	1–2	0–3	1–1	2–1	4–1	2–0	1–0
Ferencváros	3–1	2–0		5–2	1–0	1–1	3–0	2–0	0–1	1–0	1–1	0–0	3–3	1–1	3–0	1–3
Győr	3–3	2–1	2–0		4–0	4–2	1–0	3–3	1–1	2–0	1–0	1–1	2–0	3–2	1–0	1–3
Haladás	3–0	2–0	0–0	2–2		0–0	4–0	2–0	4–1	1–1	1–1	0–3	2–2	1–0	1–2	1–1
Budapest Honvéd	2–0	0–0	2–0	1–0	3–0		5–1	2–0	3–0	0–0	3–1	0–0	4–0	2–0	2–0	1–0
Kaposvár	2–2	0–3	1–0	1–2	1–1	0–2		0–7	3–0	0–0	2–2	0–0	0–0	3–3	3–1	0–2
MTK-VM	2–0	1–0	3–1	2–2	3–2	4–3	4–0		3–1	2–1	1–6	2–0	1–2	2–3	1–1	1–0
Pécs	2–0	0–3	1–0	2–0	2–1	3–0	2–1	3–0		0–0	2–1	0–1	1–2	1–0	0–0	1–1
Siofoki Bányász	2–1	3–1	1–5	2–1	3–3	0–0	3–1	1–3	1–1		2–2	2–1	1–0	0–1	2–1	2–1
Tatabánya	2–1	7–1	0–2	3–1	3–0	1–0	4–0	4–3	2–2	3–1		2–2	0–0	0–4	1–1	0–0
Újpesti Dózsa	4–0	2–1	1–4	3–1	0–0	3–1	1–1	4–0	1–0	4–2	1–1		2–2	1–0	0–0	4–0
Vasas	1–1	0–1	1–0	0–1	0–1	2–4	4–2	1–0	1–1	3–0	0–1	3–5		1–1	1–0	1–0
Váci Izzó	1–1	3–0	2–1	0–1	0–0	1–1	2–1	0–1	3–1	1–1	1–2	1–0	0–0		0–1	2–0
Videoton	0–0	2–0	2–2	2–2	2–4	0–1	0–0	1–1	0–0	4–3	2–0	1–1	0–0	0–0		4–0
Zalaegerszeg	0–0	2–2	0–2	1–0	0–1	0–1	3–0	3–1	0–1	3–1	0–0	1–1	1–1	1–1	0–0	

Source: rsssf.com
Legend: Blue = home team win; Yellow = draw; Red = away team win.

== Statistical leaders ==
=== Top goalscorers ===
Rank	Scorer	Club	Goals
1	(Hungary) Béla Melis	Debreceni MVSC	19
2	(Hungary) György Szeibert	MTK-VM	18
3	(Hungary) Kálmán Kovács	Budapest Honvéd	17
4	(Hungary) Pál Fischer	Ferencvárosi TC	15
5	(Hungary) József Kiprich	Tatabányai Bányász	14
5	(Hungary) Gyula Plotár	Tatabányai Bányász	14
7	(Hungary) Béla Illés	Haladás VSE	12
7	(Hungary) László Szabadi	Vasas SC	12
9	(Hungary) Gábor Pölöskei	MTK-VM	11
9	(Hungary) Péter Rubold	Győri ETO FC	11
9	(Hungary) István Vincze	Tatabányai Bányász	11

== Attendances ==
Average home league attendance top 3:

#	Club	Average
1	Ferencváros	17,933
2	Győr	11,000
3	Budapest Honvéd	9,867
