= Szarvasi FC =

Hungarian football club

- Full name: Szarvasi Football Club
- Founded: 1905; 121 years ago
- Ground: Erzsébetligeti Sporttelep
- Website: https://szarvasifc.hu/
Home colours	Away colours

Szarvasi Football Club is a professional football club based in Szarvas, Békés County, Hungary, that competes in the Békés county league.

== History ==
Szarvas won the Kőrös group of the 1985–86 Nemzeti Bajnokság III season; therefore, qualified for the second division. Szarvas finished in the last position of the 1986–87 Nemzeti Bajnokság II season and therefore they were releagted to the third division.

Szarvas repeated their triumph by winning the Kőrös group of the 1987–88 Nemzeti Bajnokság III season.

== Name changes ==
- 1905–?: Juventus SC
- ?-1923: Szarvasi Iparosok és Munkások Testedző Köre
- 1923: merger with MOVE Szarvasi Torna and Atlétikai Club
- 1923–1942: Szarvasi Turul Sport Egyesület
- 1942–1945: Szarvasi MOVE Turul Sport Egyesület
- 1945–1948: Szarvasi SE
- 1948: merger with Szarvasi MaDISz and Szarvasi Barátság SE
- 1948–1949: Szarvasi EPOSz
- 1949–1950: Szarvasi Vasas
- 1950–1951: Szarvasi SzSE
- 1951–1952: Szarvasi Vasas SK
- 1952–1957: Szarvasi Traktor
- 1957-1957: Szarvasi Hunyadi
- 1957–1958: Szarvasi MEDOSZ SE
- 1958–1962: Szarvasi SC
- 1962: merger with Szarvasi Spartacus SK
- 1962–1971: Szarvasi Spartacus SC
- 1971: merger with Szarvasi Főiskola
- 1971–1985: Szarvasi Főiskola Spartacus Sport Club
- 1985–1995: Szarvasi Vasas Spartacus SE
- 1995–2018: Szarvasi Football Club
- 2019– present: Szarvasi Football Club 1905

== Honours ==
- Nemzeti Bajnokság III:
  - Winners (2): 1985–86, 1987–88
