= Szegedi Dózsa SC =

Hungarian football club

- Full name: Szegedi Dózsa Sport Club
- Founded: 1950
- Dissolved: 1994
- Ground: Dózsa Sporttelep
Home colours

Szegedi Dózsa Sport Club is a defunct professional football club based in Szeged, Hungary.

== History ==
=== The History of Szegedi Dózsa (1912–1950) ===
The history of Szegedi Dózsa dates back to 1912 through its legal predecessor, the SZTK (Szeged Physical Exercise Society), which was founded that year. The book *History of Hungarian Sports Clubs*, published in 1942, states that the sports field was already located on Hunyadi Square at that time, with a capacity of 3,500. At that time, in addition to soccer, the club also operated sections for track and field, boxing, fencing, tennis, and shooting. In the summer of 1949, the Szeged Police team took the place of the SZTK soccer team and competed in the District First Division, where it immediately won the championship title.

=== Szegedi Dózsa: From Its Founding to Its Dissolution (1950–1994) ===
Then, in 1950, Szeged Dózsa SE was founded (the impetus for this came from the founding of Budapest Dózsa (Újpest FC) on March 31, 1950, as Dózsa clubs began to spring up one after another in the provinces from that point on), and Szeged Rendőr merged with Dózsa. The founding members of Dózsa were: István Révész, Mihály Madarász, Mihály Temesvári, János Lovasi, Béla Simándi, and Vince Gyurkó. Like the other Dózsa teams, the club’s colors were purple and white.

Since Szegedi Rendőr had won the 1949–50 District Division I championship, Szegedi Dózsa was able to begin its campaign in Nemzeti Bajnokság III. It is worth noting that the coach of the championship team at that time was György Kalmár, who, a few years earlier, had won a bronze medal in Nemzeti Bajnokság I and the title of national top scorer while playing for Szeged AK, founded in 1899. He retired from professional soccer in 1942 and began his coaching career shortly thereafter.

Returning to Dózsa, the July 4, 1950, issue of the daily newspaper *Délmagyarország* reported on Szegedi Dózsa’s debut match, which was a friendly: Szegedi Dózsa – Szolnoki Dózsa 9–0 (3–0). The team’s first league match (Nemzeti Bajnokság III Szeged-Kiskunhalas group), played at Hunyadi Square against SZTE Szentes (2–1), drew a crowd of 3,000 spectators. Unfortunately, due to reorganization, Dózsa was only able to spend half a season in NB III, as the league was temporarily suspended in 1951. Yet the team was performing very well at the time; after half a season, Dózsa—coached by György Kalmár—was in second place, just one point behind Kiskunfélegyháza.

From that point on, until 1966, the team competed with varying degrees of success in the county league (the county leagues were first established in 1951). The two most notable achievements of this period were when Szegedi Dózsa advanced to the national finals of the Magyar Kupa as one of the top 64 teams. On both occasions, an Nemzeti Bajnokság I team stood in the team’s way in the match to advance to the round of 32: in 1951 Szegedi Dózsa lost to Szegedi Honvéd SE 0–7, and in 1955, Szegedi Dózsa lost to Szolnoki Légierő SE 1–2.

In 1966, the team successfully moved up a division to NB III; in fact, this promotion provided such momentum that by 1967 the team had already won the championship in the Southeast Group of NB III with confidence, finishing 7 points ahead of second-place Mezőberényi Spartacus. The following year, a seventh-place finish in the Eastern Group of NB II was a fantastic achievement for a newcomer. Spurred by these successes, improvements were initiated on the field, and it was decided to convert the cinder-surfaced field on Hunyadi Square to a grass surface. Work began immediately after the final league match, so in 1969, during Dózsa’s first home game of the new NB II season—a 1-1 draw against DVSC—the teams were already able to take the field on a grass surface. Following a weaker performance in 1969 (12th place), the half-season championship in 1970 brought another great success, as the team finished in 4th place; in fact, that year, for the first time in its history, it qualified among the top 32 teams in the MNK, but they narrowly missed advancing to the round of 16, as they could only manage a 0–0 draw against the lower-division team Bajai Vasas MTE. The team’s momentum continued, as they won the bronze medal in the Eastern Group during the 1970–71 season, finishing behind Pénzügyőr SE and Ceglédi VSE—a feat they repeated in 1972–73 (interestingly, György Kalmár was once again the coach at that time).

Then, in 1974, the MLSZ drastically reduced the number of teams in the NB, replacing the previous system of NB I, NB I B, NB II, and NB III with the NB I, NB II, and NB III divisions; as a result, Dózsa remained in the third tier, though it was no longer called NB II. The team competed continuously in the third division until 1978, continuing to achieve considerable success both in the league (1975–76: 3rd place, 1976–77: 2nd place) and in the cup (February 1975, reaching the top 32: Szegedi Dózsa – Diósgyőri VTK 0–2; November 1975, reached the round of 32: Szegedi Dózsa – Szolnoki MTE 0–0, Szolnok advanced on penalty kicks; 1977, reached the round of 32: Szegedi Dózsa – Békéscsabai Előre Spartacus 1–1, Békéscsaba advanced on penalty kicks).

Although our team finished only in 5th place in the Nemzeti Bajnokság III Eastern Group during the 1977–78 season, thanks to further reorganizations (NB II was expanded to three groups), Szegedi Dózsa was promoted to the second tier of Hungarian soccer for the first time in its history. Their debut in the 1978–79 second division (Central Group) was anything but a failure, as Szegedi Dózsa fought until the very end for promotion to NB I. But let’s not get ahead of ourselves: in the first round, for example, the team faced its big-city rival, Szegedi EOL AK—which had just been relegated from NB I—and the match, played in front of 3,000 spectators at the SZEOL Stadium, ended in a 2–2 draw. In the rematch in February 1979 at the Dózsa Stadium, in front of 5,500 spectators, the team achieved even greater success, defeating SZEOL 2–1. Incidentally, the record attendance was set on April 8, 1979, during a match against Volán SC—which had been promoted to NB I ahead of Szegedi Dózsa— when 7,000 spectators watched as Lajos Kun (who later became truly famous playing for SZEOL and Szeged SC) scored two goals to help Dózsa secure a 2–2 draw. By the end of the season, the team finished in second place, so the dream of reaching NB I did not come true (36 matches, 15 wins, 16 draws, 5 losses). This season, Szegedi EOL AK finished a disappointing 6th (it was the first time in the club’s history that it failed to immediately return to the top flight after being relegated from NB I, even though the public was once again expecting promotion), so at that time, Dózsa was Szeged’s most successful team—which is quite a statement, because neither before nor since has Szeged’s “main team” ever been anything other than the legal successors of Szegedi AK, founded in 1899. László Mező, in his book *Mesél a Hunyadi Tér* (*Tales of Hunyadi Square*), writes the following about this:

"The greatest achievement during Szegedi Dózsa’s existence was this silver medal, which the team won in the second tier of Hungarian soccer! For a long time, we were also in contention for the league title. The city’s representative team, SZEOL AK, finished only in 6th place behind us... Perhaps if our team had received at least as much support as they did, the dream of reaching NB I wouldn’t have remained just a dream...”

Unfortunately, the team was unable to repeat the previous year’s outstanding performance, finishing only in 12th place. They did, however, manage to defeat SZEOL AK—which had by then fallen behind Dózsa (though it still held third place)—at home (2–0). The following season (1980–81) brought a similar result (10th place), and even against Szegedi EOL AK—which had won the Central Group by a landslide—the team could only manage a draw, falling just one point short (2–2 at the SZEOL Stadium in front of 6,000 fans). Subsequently, the structure of the Hungarian second division underwent further changes; the three-group NB II, established in 1978, was reduced back to two groups, so the rules for the 1981–82 season stipulated that only the top five teams in each group could remain in NB II. Unfortunately, Szegedi Dózsa was far from achieving this goal that year, finishing in 14th place; thus, after four years in NB II, the club bid farewell to the Hungarian second division for a time.

At that time, few could have imagined that after a few years in NB III (Körös Group), the team would be saying goodbye to the third division as well (1985–86). The only highlight from this period was the reach the quarter-finals of the 1984–85 Magyar Kupa finals—and rightly so, as this was the best cup performance in the club’s history. The results in the national finals were as follows: Mélykút – Szegedi Dózsa 2–3, Szegedi Dózsa – Metripond SE Hódmezővásárhely 2–2 (Szeged advanced on penalty kicks), Szegedi Dózsa – Szegedi EOL AK 3–2, Balmazújvárosi FC – Szegedi Dózsa 1–3, Szegedi Dózsa – Tatabányai Bányász 1–5.

Following their relegation from NB III, the club enjoyed one final period of success: first, they won the 1986–87 county championship by a landslide, and then, two years later, (1988–89) they won the Körös Group of NB III with similarly impressive dominance, thus finding themselves back in the second tier of Hungarian soccer for the 1989–90 season following their 1982 relegation. This time, however, they were unable to hold their ground in this division, as Szegedi Dózsa finished in last place by a wide margin. Interestingly, this was the last time two teams from Szeged faced each other in the Hungarian second division (Szeged SC, which finished in first place and was promoted to NB I, defeated Dózsa in both the home and away matches).

The changes following the transition to a democratic system caused a crisis in all of the country’s Dózsa teams. These clubs either ceased to exist, changed their names, or merged with another team. This was also the case in Szeged, where, after being relegated from Nemzeti Bajnokság II, the team continued to compete in the Körös group of NB III for a few years, only to be dissolved midway through the 1994–95 season and merged into Szeged FC—which was also struggling and had recently been relegated from NB II (the successor to SZEOL AK and later Szeged SC), and Szentesi FC took Dózsa’s vacant spot after the 16th round.

=== Life After the Dózsa Stadium in Szeged (1994–Present) ===
The stands at the Hunyadi Square field were demolished (the photos show what it looked like in its heyday); after that, the field lay unused for a while, until the early 2000s, when a team called Rendőr TE was formed. The team currently competes in the 3rd division of the county league and uses the field.

== Name changes ==
- Szegedi Dózsa SK: 1950 – 1965
- Szeged-Rókusi Dózsa: 1965 – ?
- Szegedi Dózsa SE: ? – ?
- Szegedi Dózsa FC: ? – ?
- Szegedi Dózsa SC: ? – 1994

== Honours ==
=== League ===
- Nemzeti Bajnokság III:
  - Winners (1): 1988–89

== Seasons ==
The table below shows the seasons of Szegedi Dózsa SC.

| Season | Tier | Club's name | Position | Pts |
|---|---|---|---|---|
| 1949–50 | 4 | Szegedi Dózsa | 1 / 16 | 51 |
| 1950 | 3 | Szegedi Dózsa | 2 / 16 | 26 |
| 1951 | 3 | Szegedi Dózsa | 6 / 15 | 38 |
| 1952 | 3 | Szegedi Dózsa | 3 / 14 | 41 |
| 1953 | 3 | Szegedi Dózsa | 1 / 14 | 44 |
| 1954 | 3 | Szegedi Dózsa | 5 / 16 | 28 |
| 1955 | 3 | Szegedi Dózsa | 4 / 16 | 43 |
| 1956 | 3 | Szegedi Dózsa | 6 / 16 | 37 |
| 1957 | 3 | Szegedi Dózsa | 8 / 10 | 12 |
| 1957–58 | 4 | Szegedi Dózsa | 5 / 16 | 41 |
| 1958–59 | 4 | Szegedi Dózsa | 2 / 16 | 42 |
| 1959–60 | 4 | Szegedi Dózsa | 6 / 17 | 34 |
| 1960–61 | 4 | Szegedi Dózsa | 4 / 18 | 41 |
| 1961–62 | 4 | Szegedi Dózsa | 3 / 16 | 40 |
| 1962–63 | 4 | Szegedi Dózsa | 9 / 17 | 26 |
| 1963 | 5 | Szegedi Dózsa | 3 / 18 | 23 |
| 1964 | 5 | Szegedi Dózsa | 3 / 18 | 39 |
| 1965 | 5 | Szeged-Rókusi Dózsa | 3 / 17 | 41 |
| 1966 | 5 | Szegedi Dózsa | 2 / 16 | 37 |
| 1967 | 4 | Szegedi Dózsa | 1 / 16 | 44 |
| 1968 | 3 | Szegedi Dózsa | 7 / 16 | 30 |
| 1969 | 3 | Szegedi Dózsa | 12 / 16 | 27 |
| 1970 | 3 | Szegedi Dózsa | 4 / 16 | 17 |
| 1970–71 | 3 | Szegedi Dózsa | 3 / 16 | 36 |
| 1971–72 | 3 | Szegedi Dózsa | 7 / 16 | 29 |
| 1972–73 | 3 | Szegedi Dózsa | 3 / 16 | 38 |
| 1973–74 | 3 | Szegedi Dózsa | 4 / 16 | 36 |
| 1974–75 | 3 | Szegedi Dózsa | 7 / 20 | 40 |
| 1975–76 | 3 | Szegedi Dózsa | 3 / 20 | 47 |
| 1976–77 | 3 | Szegedi Dózsa | 2 / 20 | 51 |
| 1977–78 | 3 | Szegedi Dózsa | 5 / 20 | 46 |
| 1978–79 | 2 | Szegedi Dózsa | 2 / 19 | 46 |
| 1979–80 | 2 | Szegedi Dózsa | 12 / 20 | 35 |
| 1980–81 | 2 | Szegedi Dózsa | 10 / 20 | 36 |
| 1981–82 | 2 | Szegedi Dózsa | 14 / 16 | 21 |
| 1982–83 | 3 | Szegedi Dózsa | 11 / 16 | 24 |
| 1983–84 | 3 | Szegedi Dózsa SE | 8 / 16 | 32 |
| 1984–85 | 3 | Szegedi Dózsa | 6 / 16 | 33 |
| 1985–86 | 3 | Szegedi Dózsa | 14 / 16 | 24 |
| 1986–87 | 4 | Szegedi Dózsa | 1 / 16 | 51 |
| 1987–88 | 3 | Szegedi Dózsa | 6 / 16 | 34 |
| 1988–89 | 3 | Szegedi Dózsa | 1 / 16 | 71 |
| 1989–90 | 2 | Szegedi Dózsa SE | 16 / 16 | 17 |
| 1990–91 | 3 | Szegedi Dózsa SC | 3 / 16 | 37 |
| 1991–92 | 3 | Szegedi Dózsa SC | 12 / 16 | 27 |
| 1992–93 | 3 | Szegedi Dózsa SC | 4 / 16 | 36 |
| 1993–94 | 3 | Szegedi Dózsa SC | 8 / 16 | 30 |
