= Keszthelyi Haladás SC =

Hungarian football club

- Full name: Keszthelyi Haladás SC
- Founded: 1902
- Website: https://khsc2024.bfw.hu/
Home colours

Keszthelyi Haladás SC is a defunct professional football club based in Keszthely, Zala County, Hungary.

== History ==
Keszthelyi Haladás SC won the Bakony group of the 1992–93 Nemzeti Bajnokság III and gained promotion to the second division. The club spent three consecutive seasons in the second tier. However, in the 1995–96 Nemzeti Bajnokság II season the club finished 16th position and thus were relegated.

== Name changes ==
- Keszthelyi Törekvés SE: ? – ?
- Keszthelyi Gazdasági Akadémiai Atlétikai Club: ? – ?
- Keszthelyi Levente Egyesület: ? – 1944
- Keszthelyi Vasutas SE: 1945 – 1946
- Balaton MÁV SE: 1946 – 1947
- 1947: merger with Keszthelyi Barátság
- Keszthelyi Törekvés SE: 1947 – 1948
- Keszthelyi Szakszervezeti Törekvés SE: 1948 – 1950
- Keszthelyi Törekvés SE: 1950 – 1951
- Keszthelyi Petőfi SK: 1951 – 1954
- 1954: merger with Keszthelyi Lokomotív
- Keszthelyi Előre: 1954 – 1955
- Keszthelyi Törekvés: 1955 – 1957
- 1957: merger whit Keszthelyi Spartacus, Keszthelyi Fáklya, Keszthelyi Haladás, Keszthelyi Traktor and Keszthelyi Törekvés
- Keszthelyi MÁV Haladás: 1957 – 1959
- Keszthelyi Előre Petőfi SK: 1959 – ?
- Keszthelyi Haladás SC: ? – 1993
- Keszthelyi Honvéd Haladás SE: 1993 – 1995
- 1995: dissolved
- 2010: reestablished
- Keszthelyi Haladás SC: 2010 – 2013
- 2020: merger with Haladás-FC Keszthely
- Keszthelyi Haladás SC: 2020 –

== Honours ==
=== League ===
- Nemzeti Bajnokság III:
  - Winners (1): 1992–93

== Seasons ==
The table below shows the seasons of Keszthelyi Haladás SC.

Season	Tier	Club's name	Position	Pts
1933–34	3	Keszthelyi Törekvés SE	6 / 10	15
1934–35	3	Keszthelyi Törekvés SE	3 / 12	33
1935–36	3	Keszthelyi TSE	6 / 11	22
1936–37	3	Keszthelyi TSE	6 / 12	19
1943–44	5	Keszthelyi LE	3 / 6	14
1946–47	5	Balaton MÁV SE (Keszthely)	3 / 10	23
1947–48	5	Keszthelyi Törekvés	1 / 12	33
1947–48	4	Balaton MÁV SE (Keszthely)	10 / 12	15
1948–49	4	Keszthelyi SzTSE	5 / 15	25
1949–50	4	Keszthelyi Szakszervezeti Törekvés SE	15 / 16	15
1950	4	Keszthelyi Törekvés SE	0 / 16	
1951	4	Keszthelyi Petőfi	1 / 7	
1952	3	Keszthelyi Petőfi	9 / 14	23
1953	3	Keszthelyi Petőfi SE	12 / 16	27
1954	3	Keszthelyi [Petőfi] Előre	10 / 16	22
1955	3	Keszthelyi [Előre] Törekvés	9 / 16	23
1956	3	Keszthelyi Törekvés	7 / 14	27
1957	3	Keszthelyi MÁV Haladás	2 / 6	16
1957–58	3	Keszthelyi MÁV Haladás	16 / 16	16
1958–59	4	Keszthelyi Előre Petőfi	2 / 16	40
1959–60	4	Keszthelyi Előre Petőfi SK	1 / 17	45
1960–61	3	Keszthelyi Előre Petőfi SK	8 / 16	31
1961–62	3	Keszthelyi Előre Petőfi	4 / 16	40
1962–63	3	Keszthelyi Haladás Petőfi	9 / 16	28
1963	4	Keszthelyi Haladás	4 / 16	19
1964	4	Keszthelyi Haladás	10 / 17	26
1965	4	Keszthelyi Haladás	10 / 16	28
1966	4	Keszthelyi Haladás	10 / 16	26
1967	4	Keszthelyi Haladás Petőfi	3 / 16	37
1968	4	Keszthelyi Haladás	6 / 16	33
1969	4	Keszthelyi Haladás	2 / 17	44
1970	4	Keszthelyi Haladás	4 / 16	18
1970–71	4	Keszthelyi Haladás	8 / 16	30
1971–72	4	Keszthelyi Haladás	14 / 16	22
1972–73	5	Keszthelyi Haladás SC	2 / 16	36
1973–74	5	Keszthelyi Haladás SC	4 / 16	35
1974–75	4	Keszthelyi Haladás SC	4 / 16	41
1975–76	4	Keszthelyi Haladás SC	8 / 16	31
1976–77	4	Keszthelyi Haladás SC	1 / 16	47
1977–78	3	Keszthelyi Haladás	17 / 20	27
1978–79	3	Keszthelyi Haladás SC	4 / 16	40
1979–80	3	Keszthelyi Haladás	1 / 18	54
1980–81	2	Keszthelyi Haladás SC	3 / 20	49
1981–82	2	Keszthelyi Haladás SE	4 / 16	39
1982–83	2	Keszthelyi Haladás SC	11 / 20	37
1983–84	2	Keszthelyi Haladás SC	13 / 20	35
1984–85	2	Keszthelyi Haladás	15 / 20	32
1985–86	2	Keszthelyi Haladás	6 / 20	39
1986–87	2	Keszthelyi Haladás	17 / 20	33
1987–88	3	Keszthelyi Haladás SC	3 / 18	52
1988–89	2	Keszthelyi Haladás SE	7 / 16	45
1989–90	2	Keszthelyi ATE Haladás SC	14 / 16	27
1990–91	3	Keszthely	2 / 16	42
1991–92	3	Keszthely	2 / 16	44
1992–93	3	Keszthelyi Haladás SE	1 / 16	40
1993–94	2	Keszthelyi Honvéd Haladás SE	5 / 16	34
1994–95	2	Keszthelyi Haladás HSE	9 / 16	40
1995–96	2	Keszthelyi Haladás	16 / 16	16
1996–97	-	-	-	-
1997–98	-	-	-	-
1998–99	-	-	-	-
1999–00	-	-	-	-
2000–01	-	-	-	-
2001–02	-	-	-	-
2002–03	-	-	-	-
2003–04	-	-	-	-
2004–05	-	-	-	-
2005–06	-	-	-	-
2006–07	-	-	-	-
2007–08	-	-	-	-
2008–09	-	-	-	-
2009–10	-	-	-	-
2010–11	-	-	-	-
2011–12	6	Keszthelyi Haladás SC	2 / 16	74
2012–13	6	Keszthelyi Haladás SC	14 / 16	23
2013–14	-	-	-	-
2014–15	-	-	-	-
2015–16	-	-	-	-
2016–17	-	-	-	-
2017–18	-	-	-	-
2018–19	-	-	-	-
2019–20	-	-	-	-
2020–21	6	Keszthelyi Haladás SC	1 / 15	70
2021–22	5	Keszthelyi Haladás SC	12 / 16	33
2022–23	5	Keszthelyi Haladás SC	10 / 14	29
2023–24	5	Keszthelyi Haladás SC	7 / 13	26
2024–25	5	Keszthelyi Haladás SC	12 / 15	26
2025–26	5	Keszthelyi Haladás SC	3 / 14	45
