= 1964 Nemzeti Bajnokság III =

Nemzeti Bajnokság III
- Season: 1964
- Champions: III. Kerületi TTVE (West); Jászberényi Lehel SC (East)
- Promoted: III. Kerületi TTVE (West); Jászberényi Lehel SC (East)

The 1964 Nemzeti Bajnokság III season was the 14th edition of the Nemzeti Bajnokság III.

== League tables ==
=== Western group ===
Pos	Teams	Pld	W	D	L	GF	GA	GD	Pts	Promotion or relegation
1	III. Kerületi TTVE	34	23	4	7	76	44	32	50	Promotion to Nemzeti Bajnokság II
2	Pécsi Bányász SC	34	19	10	5	65	33	32	48	
3	Kaposvári Honvéd SE	34	14	45	5	47	33	14	43	
4	Pécsi VSK	34	16	7	11	60	40	20	39	
5	Budai Spartacus SC	34	17	5	12	49	38	11	39	
6	Pécsi BTC	34	16	6	12	42	46	-4	38	
7	Győri Dózsa	34	14	8	12	48	36	12	36	
8	Pápai Textiles	34	16	4	14	44	45	-1	36	
9	Zalaegerszegi Dózsa	34	11	12	11	40	46	-6	34	
10	Veszprémi Haladás-Petőfi	34	13	5	16	51	48	3	31	
11	Zalaegerszegi TE	34	12	6	16	58	67	-9	30	
12	Mosonmagyaróvári TE	34	11	8	15	51	60	-9	30	
13	Székesfehérvári MÁV Előre SC	34	11	8	15	41	53	-12	30	
14	Esztergomi Vasas	34	10	8	16	49	55	-6	28	
15	Fővárosi Autóbusz SK	34	10	8	16	32	59	-27	28	
16	Erzsébeti Vasas TK	34	10	7	17	34	46	-12	27	Relegation to Megyei Bajnokság I
17	Vörös Csillag Traktorgyár	34	10	5	19	55	67	-12	25	Relegation to Megyei Bajnokság I
18	Kőbányai Lombik TK	34	7	6	21	29	55	-26	20	Relegation to Megyei Bajnokság I

=== Eastern group ===
Pos	Teams	Pld	W	D	L	GF	GA	GD	Pts	Promotion or relegation
1	Jászberényi Lehel	34	21	7	6	48	25	23	49	Promotion to Nemzeti Bajnokság II
2	Egri Dózsa SC	34	21	6	7	68	32	36	48	
3	Kecskeméti Dózsa	34	19	6	9	54	28	26	44	
4	Budapesti Spartacus SC	34	16	8	10	60	36	24	40	
5	Szolnoki MTE	34	16	7	11	54	43	11	39	
6	Budapesti Előre SC	34	15	8	11	43	33	10	38	
7	Szolnoki MÁV SE	34	14	8	12	51	45	6	36	
8	Békéscsabai Előre	34	13	8	13	50	66	-16	34	
9	Szegedi VSE	34	12	9	13	62	54	8	33	
10	Nagybátonyi Bányász SC	34	12	7	15	40	35	5	31	
11	Gyulai MEDOSZ SE	34	11	9	14	49	46	3	31	
12	Kisterenyei Bányász	34	10	10	14	44	64	-20	30	
13	Vasas Izzó SK	34	11	7	16	43	52	-9	29	
14	KISTEXT SK	34	9	11	14	44	54	-10	29	
15	Miskolci Bányász	34	11	7	16	45	57	-12	29	
16	Baglyasaljai Bányász	34	9	7	18	26	60	-34	25	Relegation to Megyei Bajnokság I
17	Debreceni Dózsa	34	6	12	16	33	54	-21	24	Relegation to Megyei Bajnokság I
18	Nyíregyházi MSE	34	8	7	19	36	66	-30	23	Relegation to Megyei Bajnokság I

== See also ==
- 1964 Magyar Kupa
- 1964 Nemzeti Bajnokság I
- 1964 Nemzeti Bajnokság II
