= 1958–59 Nemzeti Bajnokság III =

Nemzeti Bajnokság III
- Season: 1958–59
- Champions: Pápai Textiles SE (Northwest); Kaposvári MTE (Southwest); Nagybátonyi Bányász SC (North); Erzsébeti Vasas TK (North-centre); Diósgyőri Bányász SC (Northeast); Orosházi Kinizsi SE (Southeast)
- Promoted: Kaposvári MTE (Southwest); Nagybátonyi Bányász SC (North); Erzsébeti Vasas TK (North-centre); Diósgyőri Bányász SC (Northeast); Orosházi Kinizsi SE (Southeast)

The 1958–59 Nemzeti Bajnokság III season was the 9th edition of the Nemzeti Bajnokság III.

== League tables ==
=== Northwestern group ===
| Pos | Teams | Pld | W | D | L | GF | GA | GD | Pts | Promotion or relegation |
|---|---|---|---|---|---|---|---|---|---|---|
| 1 | Pápai Textiles SE | 30 | 19 | 4 | 7 | 63 | 39 | 24 | 42 | |
| 2 | Kapuvári SE | 30 | 18 | 3 | 9 | 65 | 41 | 24 | 39 | |
| 3 | Soproni VSE | 30 | 15 | 9 | 6 | 57 | 36 | 21 | 39 | |
| 4 | GANZ-MÁVAG SK | 30 | 17 | 4 | 9 | 67 | 38 | 29 | 38 | |
| 5 | Almásfüzitői Olajmunkás | 30 | 14 | 7 | 9 | 44 | 38 | 6 | 35 | |
| 6 | Szombathelyi Vasas | 30 | 15 | 4 | 11 | 49 | 42 | 7 | 34 | |
| 7 | Szombathelyi Pamutipar | 30 | 13 | 7 | 10 | 58 | 42 | 16 | 33 | |
| 8 | Várpalotai Bányász SK | 30 | 14 | 5 | 11 | 43 | 41 | 2 | 33 | |
| 9 | Veszprémi Vasas TC | 30 | 9 | 11 | 10 | 55 | 46 | 9 | 29 | |
| 10 | Törekvés SE | 30 | 11 | 7 | 12 | 40 | 53 | -13 | 29 | |
| 11 | Vasas Ikarus SK | 30 | 12 | 4 | 14 | 47 | 49 | -2 | 28 | |
| 12 | Soproni SOTEX | 30 | 10 | 7 | 13 | 42 | 43 | -1 | 27 | Relegation to Megyei Bajnokság I |
| 13 | Zalaegerszegi Dózsa | 30 | 10 | 7 | 13 | 40 | 47 | -7 | 27 | Relegation to Megyei Bajnokság I |
| 14 | Veszprémi Haladás | 30 | 10 | 4 | 16 | 39 | 68 | -29 | 24 | Relegation to Megyei Bajnokság I |
| 15 | Bp. Vörös Meteor | 30 | 6 | 3 | 21 | 29 | 63 | -34 | 15 | Relegation to Megyei Bajnokság I |
| 16 | Celldömölki VESE | 30 | 2 | 4 | 24 | 26 | 78 | -52 | 8 | Relegation to Megyei Bajnokság I |

=== Southwestern group ===
| Pos | Teams | Pld | W | D | L | GF | GA | GD | Pts | Promotion or relegation |
|---|---|---|---|---|---|---|---|---|---|---|
| 1 | Kaposvári MTE | 30 | 21 | 5 | 4 | 82 | 32 | 50 | 47 | Promotion to Nemzeti Bajnokság II |
| 2 | Pécsi Bányász | 30 | 17 | 7 | 6 | 79 | 38 | 41 | 41 | |
| 3 | Bajai Épitők | 30 | 19 | 3 | 8 | 66 | 37 | 29 | 41 | |
| 4 | Bajai Bácska Posztó | 30 | 17 | 4 | 9 | 56 | 35 | 21 | 38 | |
| 5 | Pécsi Vasas | 30 | 17 | 4 | 9 | 56 | 38 | 18 | 38 | |
| 6 | Bázakerettyei Bányász | 30 | 15 | 4 | 11 | 65 | 51 | 14 | 34 | |
| 7 | Pécsi BTC | 30 | 13 | 8 | 9 | 45 | 39 | 6 | 34 | |
| 8 | Nagykanizsai Bányász | 30 | 12 | 6 | 12 | 60 | 51 | 9 | 30 | |
| 9 | Szekszárdi Petőfi | 30 | 13 | 4 | 13 | 52 | 51 | 1 | 30 | |
| 10 | Bonyhádi Vasas SK | 30 | 10 | 8 | 12 | 37 | 54 | -17 | 28 | |
| 11 | Székesfehérvári MÁV Előre SC | 30 | 9 | 8 | 13 | 49 | 44 | 5 | 26 | |
| 12 | Bácsalmási Petőfi | 30 | 12 | 2 | 16 | 56 | 75 | -19 | 26 | |
| 13 | Simontornyai BTC | 30 | 9 | 7 | 14 | 39 | 58 | -19 | 25 | Relegation to Megyei Bajnokság I |
| 14 | Nagyatádi Kinizsi | 30 | 7 | 3 | 20 | 24 | 52 | -28 | 17 | Relegation to Megyei Bajnokság I |
| 15 | Balinkai Bányász | 30 | 5 | 3 | 22 | 30 | 81 | -51 | 13 | Relegation to Megyei Bajnokság I |
| 16 | Dombóvári VSE | 30 | 4 | 4 | 22 | 28 | 88 | -60 | 12 | Relegation to Megyei Bajnokság I |

=== Northern group ===
| Pos | Teams | Pld | W | D | L | GF | GA | GD | Pts | Promotion or relegation |
|---|---|---|---|---|---|---|---|---|---|---|
| 1 | Nagybátonyi Bányász SC | 30 | 19 | 6 | 5 | 65 | 34 | 31 | 44 | Promotion to Nemzeti Bajnokság II |
| 2 | Vasas Dinamó | 30 | 16 | 7 | 7 | 56 | 34 | 22 | 39 | |
| 3 | Baglyasaljai Bányász | 30 | 14 | 8 | 10 | 37 | 30 | 7 | 34 | |
| 4 | Gázművek MTE | 30 | 15 | 4 | 11 | 57 | 51 | 6 | 34 | |
| 5 | Kisterenyei Bányász | 30 | 12 | 8 | 10 | 47 | 40 | 7 | 32 | |
| 6 | Egercsehi Bányász | 30 | 12 | 8 | 10 | 42 | 36 | 6 | 32 | |
| 7 | Goldberger SE | 30 | 12 | 7 | 11 | 62 | 46 | 16 | 31 | |
| 8 | Eger SC | 30 | 12 | 6 | 12 | 54 | 46 | 8 | 30 | |
| 9 | Putnoki Bányász | 30 | 11 | 8 | 11 | 40 | 50 | -10 | 30 | |
| 10 | Ganzvagon | 30 | 12 | 5 | 13 | 59 | 54 | 5 | 29 | |
| 11 | Kőbányai Lombik | 30 | 10 | 7 | 13 | 50 | 52 | -2 | 27 | |
| 12 | Budapesti Petőfi | 30 | 11 | 5 | 14 | 50 | 56 | -6 | 27 | |
| 13 | Petőfibányai Bányász | 30 | 10 | 5 | 15 | 35 | 57 | -22 | 25 | |
| 14 | TRANSVILL | 30 | 10 | 4 | 16 | 52 | 70 | -18 | 24 | Relegation to Megyei Bajnokság I |
| 15 | Kazincbarcikai MTK | 30 | 9 | 4 | 17 | 45 | 63 | -18 | 22 | Relegation to Megyei Bajnokság I |
| 16 | Mezőkövesdi MTK | 30 | 5 | 10 | 15 | 29 | 61 | -32 | 20 | Relegation to Megyei Bajnokság I |

=== Northcentral group ===
| Pos | Teams | Pld | W | D | L | GF | GA | GD | Pts | Promotion or relegation |
|---|---|---|---|---|---|---|---|---|---|---|
| 1 | Erzsébeti Vasas TK | 30 | 23 | 4 | 3 | 79 | 17 | 62 | 50 | Promotion to Nemzeti Bajnokság II |
| 2 | Elektromos | 30 | 17 | 7 | 6 | 72 | 28 | 44 | 41 | |
| 3 | Vörös Csillag Traktorgyár SK | 30 | 17 | 5 | 8 | 64 | 37 | 27 | 39 | |
| 4 | Hatvani VSE | 30 | 14 | 8 | 8 | 49 | 41 | 8 | 36 | |
| 5 | Nyergesújfalui Viscosa | 30 | 13 | 9 | 8 | 52 | 33 | 19 | 35 | |
| 6 | Tokodi Bányász | 30 | 14 | 6 | 10 | 41 | 40 | 1 | 34 | |
| 7 | Kerámia | 30 | 12 | 8 | 10 | 48 | 40 | 8 | 32 | |
| 8 | Annavölgyi Bányász | 30 | 11 | 8 | 11 | 52 | 56 | -4 | 30 | |
| 9 | III. kerületi TTVE | 30 | 9 | 10 | 11 | 36 | 41 | -5 | 28 | |
| 10 | Autótaxi | 30 | 10 | 8 | 12 | 37 | 53 | -16 | 28 | |
| 11 | Pilisi Bányász | 30 | 10 | 7 | 13 | 38 | 44 | -6 | 27 | |
| 12 | Budapesti Helyiipar | 30 | 9 | 8 | 13 | 35 | 51 | -16 | 26 | |
| 13 | Péceli MÁV | 30 | 9 | 7 | 14 | 37 | 51 | -14 | 25 | Relegation to Megyei Bajnokság I |
| 14 | Esztergomi Vasas | 30 | 6 | 7 | 17 | 22 | 55 | -33 | 19 | Relegation to Megyei Bajnokság I |
| 15 | Magyar Pamut SC | 30 | 6 | 6 | 18 | 29 | 66 | -37 | 18 | Relegation to Megyei Bajnokság I |
| 16 | Budapest-Rákosfalvai ESC | 30 | 4 | 4 | 22 | 31 | 69 | -38 | 12 | Relegation to Megyei Bajnokság I |

=== Northeastern group ===
| Pos | Teams | Pld | W | D | L | GF | GA | GD | Pts | Promotion or relegation |
|---|---|---|---|---|---|---|---|---|---|---|
| 1 | Diósgyőri Bányász SC | 30 | 18 | 7 | 5 | 63 | 30 | 33 | 43 | Promotion to Nemzeti Bajnokság II |
| 2 | Martfűi MSE | 30 | 18 | 4 | 8 | 54 | 27 | 27 | 40 | |
| 3 | Debreceni EAC | 30 | 16 | 6 | 8 | 47 | 29 | 18 | 38 | |
| 4 | Nyiregyházi Spartacus | 30 | 15 | 7 | 8 | 48 | 26 | 22 | 37 | |
| 5 | Debreceni Gördülőcsapágy | 30 | 11 | 13 | 6 | 34 | 27 | 7 | 35 | |
| 6 | Perecesi Bányász | 30 | 9 | 14 | 7 | 45 | 41 | 4 | 32 | |
| 7 | Szolnoki MTE | 30 | 13 | 4 | 13 | 52 | 49 | 3 | 30 | |
| 8 | Debreceni Kinizsi | 30 | 12 | 6 | 12 | 51 | 60 | -9 | 30 | |
| 9 | Debreceni Honvéd | 30 | 11 | 6 | 13 | 49 | 41 | 8 | 28 | |
| 10 | Tiszalöki Vörös Meteor Építők | 30 | 9 | 9 | 12 | 33 | 42 | -9 | 27 | |
| 11 | Ormosbányai Bányász | 30 | 10 | 6 | 14 | 38 | 44 | -6 | 26 | |
| 12 | Kisvárdai Vasas | 30 | 10 | 6 | 14 | 29 | 44 | -15 | 26 | Relegation to Megyei Bajnokság I |
| 13 | Szolnoki Kinizsi | 30 | 10 | 5 | 15 | 43 | 54 | -11 | 25 | Relegation to Megyei Bajnokság I |
| 14 | Debreceni Épitők | 30 | 9 | 6 | 15 | 35 | 55 | -20 | 24 | Relegation to Megyei Bajnokság I |
| 15 | Nyiregyházi SZSE 1 | 30 | 8 | 5 | 17 | 23 | 37 | -14 | 19 | |
| 16 | Nyírbátori Spartacus | 30 | 6 | 6 | 18 | 25 | 63 | -38 | 18 | Relegation to Megyei Bajnokság I |

=== Southeastern group ===
| Pos | Teams | Pld | W | D | L | GF | GA | GD | Pts | Promotion or relegation |
|---|---|---|---|---|---|---|---|---|---|---|
| 1 | Orosházi Kinizsi SK | 30 | 14 | 12 | 4 | 38 | 23 | 15 | 40 | Promotion to Nemzeti Bajnokság II |
| 2 | Kecskeméti TE | 30 | 14 | 8 | 8 | 52 | 23 | 29 | 36 | |
| 3 | Makói Vasas | 30 | 16 | 3 | 11 | 62 | 29 | 33 | 35 | |
| 4 | Kiskunhalasi Medosz | 30 | 16 | 3 | 11 | 55 | 42 | 13 | 35 | |
| 5 | Békéscsabai Építők Előre | 30 | 12 | 9 | 9 | 51 | 43 | 8 | 33 | |
| 6 | Szegedi Épitők | 30 | 14 | 4 | 12 | 66 | 56 | 10 | 32 | |
| 7 | Mezőkovácsházi Petőfi | 30 | 13 | 6 | 11 | 44 | 45 | -1 | 32 | |
| 8 | Szegedi Spartacus | 30 | 12 | 7 | 11 | 37 | 37 | 0 | 31 | |
| 9 | Békéscsabai MÁV Bocskai | 30 | 12 | 6 | 12 | 41 | 41 | 0 | 30 | |
| 10 | Gyulai MEDOSZ | 30 | 9 | 11 | 10 | 46 | 45 | 1 | 29 | |
| 11 | Nagykőrösi Kinizsi | 30 | 11 | 5 | 14 | 58 | 55 | 3 | 27 | |
| 12 | MÁV Hódmezővásárhelyi MTE | 30 | 10 | 7 | 13 | 38 | 54 | -16 | 27 | |
| 13 | Kiskunfélegyházi Építők | 30 | 11 | 4 | 15 | 55 | 57 | -2 | 26 | Relegation to Megyei Bajnokság I |
| 14 | Békéscsabai Agyagipar | 30 | 9 | 7 | 14 | 38 | 50 | -12 | 25 | Relegation to Megyei Bajnokság I |
| 15 | Mezőhegyesi MEDOSZ | 30 | 6 | 9 | 15 | 33 | 66 | -33 | 21 | Relegation to Megyei Bajnokság I |
| 16 | Hódmezővásárhelyi Dózsa | 30 | 7 | 7 | 16 | 32 | 80 | -48 | 21 | Relegation to Megyei Bajnokság I |

== See also ==
- 1958–59 Magyar Kupa
- 1958–59 Nemzeti Bajnokság I
- 1958–59 Nemzeti Bajnokság II
