= 1960–61 Nemzeti Bajnokság II =

Nemzeti Bajnokság II
- Season: 1960–61
- Champions: Komlói Bányász SK (West); Ózdi Kohász SE (East)
- Promoted: Komlói Bányász SK (West); Ózdi Kohász SE (East)
- Relegated: Pécsi BTC (West); Elektromos SE (West); Vác Vasas (West); Szegedi VSE (East); Diósgyőri Bányász SC (East); Jászberényi Vasas (East)

The 1960–61 Nemzeti Bajnokság II was the 62nd season of the Nemzeti Bajnokság II, the second tier of the Hungarian football league.

== League table ==
=== Western group ===
Pos	Team	Pld	W	D	L	GF	GA	GD	Pts	Promotion or relegation
1	Komlói Bányász SK	30	20	7	3	77	23	+54	47	Promotion to Nemzeti Bajnokság I
2	Szombathelyi Haladás	30	16	5	9	53	31	+22	37	
3	FŐSPED Szállítók SE	30	12	11	7	46	40	+6	35	
4	Budafoki MTE Kinizsi	30	12	9	9	38	31	+7	33	
4?	Láng Vasas SK	30	11	9	10	38	30	+8	31	
6	Sztálinvárosi Kohász SE	30	13	5	12	44	41	+3	31	
7	Mosonmagyaróvár TE	30	11	9	10	43	45	−2	31	
8	Zalaegerszegi TE	30	14	2	14	40	40	0	30	
9	Székesfehérvári VT Vasas	30	10	9	11	50	43	+7	29	
10	Oroszlányi Bányász SK	30	10	9	11	36	35	+1	29	
11	Budai Spartacus SC	30	11	6	13	42	50	−8	28	
12	Erzsébeti Vasas TK	30	8	11	11	36	43	−7	27	
13	Kőbányai Lombik TK	30	8	10	12	32	42	−10	26	
14	Pécsi BTC	30	8	8	14	38	55	−17	24	Relegation to Nemzeti Bajnokság III
15	Elektromos SE	30	11	2	17	38	76	−38	24	Relegation to Nemzeti Bajnokság III
16	Vác Vasas	30	7	4	19	36	62	−26	18	Relegation to Nemzeti Bajnokság III

=== Eastern group ===
Pos	Team	Pld	W	D	L	GF	GA	GD	Pts	Promotion or relegation
1	Ózdi Kohász SE	30	18	6	6	54	32	+22	42	Promotion to Nemzeti Bajnokság I
2	Szolnoki MÁV SE	30	16	8	6	61	33	+28	40	
3	Ganz-MÁVAG SE	30	14	11	5	49	22	+27	39	
4	Budapesti Vasutas SC	30	18	3	9	55	30	+25	39	
5	Kecskeméti Dózsa	30	11	10	9	39	36	+3	32	
6	Miskolci VSC	30	12	7	11	42	38	+4	31	
7	Budapesti Előre SC	30	12	6	12	49	39	+10	30	
8	VM Egyetértés	30	9	11	10	36	37	−1	29	
9	Pénzügyőr SE	30	9	11	10	35	43	−8	29	
10	Nyíregyházi Spartacus	30	9	9	12	18	29	−11	27	
11	Borsodi Bányász SK	30	9	8	13	27	35	−8	26	
12	Ceglédi VSE	30	6	13	11	27	59	−32	25	
13	Budapesti Spartacus SC	30	8	8	14	35	43	−8	24	
14	Szegedi VSE	30	9	6	15	36	45	−9	24	Relegation to Nemzeti Bajnokság III
15	Diósgyőri Bányász SC	30	6	10	14	30	45	−15	22	Relegation to Nemzeti Bajnokság III
16	Jászberényi Vasas SC	30	8	5	17	32	59	−27	21	Relegation to Nemzeti Bajnokság III

== See also ==
- 1960–61 Magyar Kupa
- 1960–61 Nemzeti Bajnokság I
