= 1957–58 Nemzeti Bajnokság III =

Nemzeti Bajnokság III
- Season: 1957–58
- Champions: Pápai Textiles SE (West); Bajai Bácska Posztó SE (Southwest); Diósgyőri Bányász SC (North); Nyergesújfalui Viscosa SE (Central Danubia); Kecskeméti TE (South); Elektromos Művek TE (Northern Budapest); Erzsébeti Munkás TK (Southern Budapest); Debreceni GÖCS Vasas (East); Szolnoki Munkás TE (Southeast)
- Promoted: No promotion

The 1957–58 Nemzeti Bajnokság III season was the 8th edition of the Nemzeti Bajnokság III.

== League tables ==
=== Western group ===
Pos	Teams	Pld	W	D	L	GF	GA	GD	Pts	Promotion or relegation
1	Pápai Textiles SE	30	17	6	7	63	31	32	40	
2	Szombathelyi Vasas SC	30	14	7	9	59	34	25	35	
3	Kapuvári SE	30	13	9	8	64	42	22	35	
4	Bázakerettyei Bányász	30	14	6	10	49	44	5	34	
5	Veszprémi Vasas TC	30	14	5	11	63	49	14	33	
6	Várpalotai Bányász SK	30	13	7	10	50	40	10	33	
7	Soproni SOTEX SE	30	14	5	11	50	45	5	33	
8	Celldömölki Vasutas Egyetértés SE	30	13	6	11	42	47	-5	32	
9	Almásfüzitői Olajmunkás	30	14	3	13	43	40	3	31	Relegation to Megyei Bajnokság I
10	Pápai MÁV Petőfi	30	12	6	12	54	50	4	30	Relegation to Megyei Bajnokság I
11	Mosonmagyaróvári Hubertus	30	12	6	12	45	47	-2	30	Relegation to Megyei Bajnokság I
12	Komáromi MÁV Textiles	30	9	11	10	47	44	3	29	Relegation to Megyei Bajnokság I
13	Szombathelyi SE	30	9	6	15	36	54	-18	24	Relegation to Megyei Bajnokság I
14	Sárvári Kinizsi SK	30	9	5	16	40	60	-20	23	Relegation to Megyei Bajnokság I
15	Mosoni Vasas	30	9	4	17	48	78	-30	22	Relegation to Megyei Bajnokság I
16	Keszthelyi MÁV Haladás	30	6	4	20	26	74	-48	16	Relegation to Megyei Bajnokság I

=== Southwestern group ===
Pos	Teams	Pld	W	D	L	GF	GA	GD	Pts	Promotion or relegation
1	Bajai Bácska	30	25	3	2	79	28	51	53	
2	Pécsi Bőrgyári TC	30	15	8	7	56	32	24	38	
3	Pécsi Vasas	30	17	4	9	58	38	20	38	
4	Dombóvári Vasutas SE	30	15	7	8	65	48	17	37	
5	Pécsújhelyi Bányász	30	15	4	11	54	37	17	34	
6	Simontornyai Bőrgyári TC	30	13	5	12	57	52	5	31	
7	Bonyhádi Munkás TE	30	12	7	11	53	50	3	31	
8	Nagyatádi Kinizsi SK	30	11	8	11	55	54	1	30	
9	Nagykanizsai Vasutas TE	30	11	7	12	57	51	6	29	Relegation to Megyei Bajnokság I
10	Nagykanizsai TE Építők	30	8	13	9	45	60	-15	29	Relegation to Megyei Bajnokság I
11	Tolnai SE	30	12	4	14	49	51	-2	28	Relegation to Megyei Bajnokság I
12	Csurgói Petőfi SK	30	11	4	15	39	59	-20	26	Relegation to Megyei Bajnokság I
13	Kaposvári Dózsa SC	30	7	6	17	33	53	-20	20	Relegation to Megyei Bajnokság I
14	Mohácsi TE	30	7	6	17	36	58	-22	20	Relegation to Megyei Bajnokság I
15	Szigetvári Zrínyi Miklós SE	30	7	5	18	39	81	-42	19	Relegation to Megyei Bajnokság I
16	Kaposvári Textiles	30	6	5	19	35	58	-23	17	Relegation to Megyei Bajnokság I

=== Northern group ===
Pos	Teams	Pld	W	D	L	GF	GA	GD	Pts	Promotion or relegation
1	Diósgyőri Bányász SC	30	17	10	3	40	17	23	44	
2	Ormosbányai Bányász	30	17	7	6	59	35	24	41	
3	Petőfibányai Bányász	30	14	9	7	50	33	17	37	
4	Egercsehi Bányász	30	15	6	9	37	29	8	36	
5	Kisterenyei Bányász	30	14	3	13	59	39	20	31	
6	Mezőkövesdi MTK	30	10	11	9	40	40	0	31	
7	Putnoki Bányász	30	12	4	14	44	37	7	28	
8	Kazincbarcikai MTK	30	10	7	13	43	43	0	27	
9	MÁV Sátoraljaújhelyi AC	30	13	1	16	49	61	-12	27	Relegation to Megyei Bajnokság I
10	Rózsaszentmártoni Bányász SE	30	9	8	13	30	33	-3	26	Relegation to Megyei Bajnokság I
11	Zagyvapálfalvai SE	30	11	4	15	43	52	-9	26	Relegation to Megyei Bajnokság I
12	Salgótarjáni Tűzhelygyár	30	10	6	14	42	57	-15	26	Relegation to Megyei Bajnokság I
13	Borsodnádasdi Vasas	30	10	6	14	40	55	-15	26	Relegation to Megyei Bajnokság I
14	Miskolci Drótgyár	30	10	6	14	37	53	-16	26	Relegation to Megyei Bajnokság I
15	Pásztói Petőfi	30	7	11	12	24	38	-14	25	Relegation to Megyei Bajnokság I
16	Diósgyőri SC	30	7	9	14	34	49	-15	23	Relegation to Megyei Bajnokság I

=== Central Danube group ===
Pos	Teams	Pld	W	D	L	GF	GA	GD	Pts	Promotion or relegation
1	Nyergesújfalui Viscosa SE	34	23	6	5	97	29	68	52	
2	Esztergomi Vasas SC	34	20	8	6	67	32	35	48	
3	Péceli MÁV AC	34	17	13	4	78	28	50	47	
4	Tokodi Bányász SK	34	19	7	8	73	41	32	45	
5	Nagykőrösi Kinizsi SK	34	16	10	8	82	47	35	42	
6	Annavölgyi Bányász SC	34	17	6	11	66	55	11	40	
7	Székesfehérvári MÁV Előre SC	34	18	3	13	84	55	29	39	
8	Pilisi Bányász	34	14	8	12	64	51	13	36	
9	Balinkai Bányász	34	15	5	14	58	64	-6	35	Relegation to Megyei Bajnokság I
10	Martonvásári MEDOSZ	34	14	6	14	38	50	-12	34	Relegation to Megyei Bajnokság I
11	Székesfehérvári Petőfi	34	13	7	14	60	50	10	33	Relegation to Megyei Bajnokság I
12	Váci Vasutas SE	34	13	5	16	63	62	1	31	Relegation to Megyei Bajnokság I
13	Szentendrei Honvéd SE	34	11	4	19	46	75	-29	26	Relegation to Megyei Bajnokság I
14	Pilisi Kinizsi SK	34	11	4	19	48	81	-33	26	Relegation to Megyei Bajnokság I
15	Gödöllői Dózsa SC	34	8	7	19	51	84	-33	23	Relegation to Megyei Bajnokság I
16	Székesfehérvári Honvéd	34	10	1	23	40	98	-58	21	Relegation to Megyei Bajnokság I
17	Adonyi Petőfi SK	34	7	4	23	41	85	-44	18	Relegation to Megyei Bajnokság I
18	Ercsi Kinizsi	34	5	6	23	30	99	-69	16	Relegation to Megyei Bajnokság I

=== Southern gtoup ===
Pos	Teams	Pld	W	D	L	GF	GA	GD	Pts	Promotion or relegation
1	Kecskeméti TE	30	18	9	3	59	21	38	45	
2	Bácsalmási Petőfi	30	19	4	7	69	47	22	42	
3	Kiskunfélegyházi Építők	30	16	8	6	60	32	28	40	
4	MÁV Hódmezővásárhelyi MTE	30	12	11	7	42	43	-1	35	
5	Szegedi Építők	30	14	6	10	61	42	19	34	
6	Kiskunhalasi Kinizsi	30	13	7	10	49	36	13	33	
7	Szegedi Spartacus-Vasas	30	12	7	11	56	35	21	31	
8	Hódmezővásárhelyi Dózsa	30	11	9	10	46	38	8	31	
9	Kiskunfélegyházi Honvéd	30	11	9	10	46	43	3	31	Relegation to Megyei Bajnokság I
10	Kecskeméti Építők	30	10	8	12	44	47	-3	28	Relegation to Megyei Bajnokság I
11	Szentesi Kinizsi	30	9	10	11	38	52	-14	28	Relegation to Megyei Bajnokság I
12	Csongrádi AK	30	9	5	16	34	45	-11	23	Relegation to Megyei Bajnokság I
13	Dorozsmai SK	30	7	9	14	44	60	-16	23	Relegation to Megyei Bajnokság I
14	Szőregi Rákóczi	30	9	5	16	44	65	-21	23	Relegation to Megyei Bajnokság I
15	Hódmezővásárhelyi Vasas	30	5	8	17	35	69	-34	18	Relegation to Megyei Bajnokság I
16	Nagylak-Csanádpalota	30	6	3	21	25	77	-52	15	Relegation to Megyei Bajnokság I

=== Northern Budapest group ===
Pos	Teams	Pld	W	D	L	GF	GA	GD	Pts	Promotion or relegation
1	Elektromos Művek TE	30	19	8	3	85	35	50	46	
2	Budapest-Rákosfalvi EMERGÉ SC	30	20	3	7	67	38	29	43	
3	TRANSVILL SK	30	15	9	6	61	44	17	39	
4	Vasas Ikarus SK	30	17	4	9	72	40	32	38	
5	Magyar Pamut SC	30	15	7	8	57	36	21	37	
6	III. kerületi TVE	30	12	11	7	36	35	1	35	
7	Zuglói Helyiipari SC	30	13	6	11	38	34	4	32	
8	Autótaxi Munkás SC	30	10	10	10	35	38	-3	30	
9	Magyar Acél SE	30	11	8	11	35	42	-7	30	Relegation to Megyei Bajnokság I
10	Kinizsi Dohánygyár	30	9	10	11	35	41	-6	28	Relegation to Megyei Bajnokság I
11	Vasas Generátor SC	30	10	6	14	39	51	-12	26	Relegation to Megyei Bajnokság I
12	Csillaghegyi MTE	30	11	2	17	33	44	-11	24	Relegation to Megyei Bajnokság I
13	Duna-cipőgyári SK	30	6	11	13	43	52	-9	23	Relegation to Megyei Bajnokság I
14	Bőrellátó SC	30	6	7	17	48	71	-23	19	Relegation to Megyei Bajnokság I
15	Statisztika VTSE	30	6	4	20	37	76	-39	16	Relegation to Megyei Bajnokság I
16	Duclos Bányagépgyár SK	30	3	8	19	34	78	-44	14	Relegation to Megyei Bajnokság I

=== Southern Budapest group ===
Pos	Teams	Pld	W	D	L	GF	GA	GD	Pts	Promotion or relegation
1	Erzsébeti Munkás TK	30	28	1	1	74	18	56	57	
2	Törekvés SE	30	22	4	4	50	21	29	48	
3	Vörös Csillag Traktorgyár SK	30	21	1	8	73	40	33	43	
4	Ganzvagon TE	30	17	4	9	54	36	18	38	
5	ATRA Vasas SK	30	15	4	11	63	26	37	34	
6	Goldberger SE	30	14	3	13	51	46	5	31	
7	Soroksár AC	30	14	3	13	54	56	-2	31	
8	Kerámia SC	30	12	6	12	56	45	11	30	
9	Újlaki FC	30	11	8	11	53	52	1	30	Relegation to Megyei Bajnokság I
10	Kőbányai Drasche SE	30	10	7	13	35	51	-16	27	Relegation to Megyei Bajnokság I
11	Rákoscsabai TK	30	8	10	12	43	55	-12	26	Relegation to Megyei Bajnokság I
12	Lőrinci Fonó DSE	30	9	6	15	37	48	-11	24	Relegation to Megyei Bajnokság I
13	Ganz Villamossági SK	30	9	3	18	30	62	-32	21	Relegation to Megyei Bajnokság I
14	Kőbányai Dózsa SK	30	7	3	20	48	67	-19	17	Relegation to Megyei Bajnokság I
15	Húsos SC	30	2	9	19	32	64	-32	13	Relegation to Megyei Bajnokság I
16	Budapesti Csokoládégyár SK	30	3	4	23	24	90	-66	10	Relegation to Megyei Bajnokság I

=== Eastern group ===
Pos	Teams	Pld	W	D	L	GF	GA	GD	Pts	Promotion or relegation
1	Debreceni GÖCS Vasas	30	17	7	6	57	24	33	41	
2	Nyíregyházi SZSE	30	15	8	7	42	26	16	38	
3	Kisvárdai SE	30	16	6	8	44	30	14	38	
4	Tiszalöki Építők	30	14	7	9	48	39	9	35	
5	Debreceni Kinizsi	30	13	7	10	42	33	9	33	
6	Debreceni Egyetemi AC	30	12	7	11	36	26	10	31	
7	Debreceni Építők	30	11	9	10	36	34	2	31	
8	Nyírbátori Spartacus	30	11	7	12	34	40	-6	29	
9	Nagyhalászi Textiles	30	12	4	14	42	44	-2	28	Relegation to Megyei Bajnokság I
10	Hajdúszoboszlói Spartacus SE	30	9	10	11	34	38	-4	28	Relegation to Megyei Bajnokság I
11	Balkányi MEDOSZ	30	11	6	13	33	44	-11	28	Relegation to Megyei Bajnokság I
12	Püspökladányi MÁV	30	13	2	15	37	52	-15	28	Relegation to Megyei Bajnokság I
13	Debreceni MÁV TK	30	8	11	11	49	46	3	27	Relegation to Megyei Bajnokság I
14	Mátészalkai TK	30	10	6	14	33	46	-13	26	Relegation to Megyei Bajnokság I
15	Nagykállói MEDOSZ	30	9	8	13	36	53	-17	26	Relegation to Megyei Bajnokság I
16	Debreceni Vörös Meteor	30	3	7	20	22	50	-28	13	Relegation to Megyei Bajnokság I

=== Southeastern group ===
Pos	Teams	Pld	W	D	L	GF	GA	GD	Pts	Promotion or relegation
1	Szolnoki Munkás TE	30	21	7	2	73	20	53	49	
2	Martfűi MSE	30	17	7	6	44	28	16	41	
3	Orosházi Kinizsi SE	30	14	11	5	62	28	34	39	
4	Mezőhegyesi MEDOSZ	30	15	5	10	46	41	5	35	
5	Békéscsabai MÁV Bocskai	30	14	5	11	56	47	9	33	
6	Békéscsabai Agyagipar Építők	30	12	9	9	44	38	6	33	
7	Mezőkovácsházi Petőfi	30	11	7	12	61	45	16	29	
8	Szolnoki Kinizsi	30	12	5	13	50	60	-10	29	
9	Jászapáti Vasutas SE	30	10	8	12	46	47	-1	28	Relegation to Megyei Bajnokság I
10	Szarvasi MEDOSZ SE	30	10	8	12	47	53	-6	28	Relegation to Megyei Bajnokság I
11	Tiszakécske SK	30	10	8	12	38	51	-13	28	Relegation to Megyei Bajnokság I
12	Mezőtúri Honvéd	30	11	5	14	28	42	-14	27	Relegation to Megyei Bajnokság I
13	Gyulai TE	30	9	7	14	51	60	-9	25	Relegation to Megyei Bajnokság I
14	Törökszentmiklósi Vasas	30	9	5	16	44	51	-7	23	Relegation to Megyei Bajnokság I
15	Szolnoki Vasutas SE	30	5	9	16	39	63	-24	19	Relegation to Megyei Bajnokság I
16	Tótkomlósi MTK	30	5	4	21	30	85	-55	14	Relegation to Megyei Bajnokság I

== See also ==
- 1957–58 Magyar Kupa
- 1957–58 Nemzeti Bajnokság I
- 1957–58 Nemzeti Bajnokság II
