= 1957–58 Nemzeti Bajnokság II =

Nemzeti Bajnokság II
- Season: 1957–58
- Champions: Győri Vasas ETO (West); Budapesti VSC (South); Miskolci VSC (East)
- Promoted: Győri Vasas ETO (West); Budapesti VSC (South); Miskolci VSC (East)

The 1957–58 Nemzeti Bajnokság II was the 59th season of the Nemzeti Bajnokság II, the second tier of the Hungarian football league.

== League table ==
=== Western group ===
Pos	Team	Pld	W	D	L	GF	GA	GD	Pts	Promotion or relegation
1	Győri Vasas ETO	36	28	6	2	118	29	+89	62	Promotion to Nemzeti Bajnokság I
2	Sztálinvárosi Vasas	36	24	7	5	104	42	+62	55	
3	Láng-gépgyár SK	36	19	12	5	69	34	+35	50	
4	Pécsi VSK	36	17	10	9	59	38	+21	44	
5	Budafoki MTE-Kinizsi	36	20	4	12	60	50	+10	44	
6	Székesfehérvári Vasas SC	36	17	7	12	51	40	+11	41	
7	Zalaegerszegi TE	36	13	15	8	52	41	+11	41	
8	Oroszlányi Bányász SK	36	17	5	14	60	58	+2	39	
9	Kaposvári Kinizsi	36	15	8	13	68	56	+12	38	
10	Mosonmagyaróvári TE	36	15	6	15	53	47	+6	36	
11	Délbudai Spartacus SC	36	10	15	11	41	48	−7	35	
12	Pécsbányatelepi Bányász SC	36	10	11	15	49	58	−9	31	Relegation to Nemzeti Bajnokság III
13	Soproni VSE	36	13	4	19	69	79	−10	30	Relegation to Nemzeti Bajnokság III
14	Kaposvári MTE	36	12	6	18	64	78	−14	30	Relegation to Nemzeti Bajnokság III
15	Szombathelyi Pamutipar SC	36	11	8	17	41	63	−22	30	Relegation to Nemzeti Bajnokság III
16	Veszprémi Haladás-Petőfi SC	36	10	6	20	50	67	−17	26	Relegation to Nemzeti Bajnokság III
17	Nagykanizsai Bányász SC	36	8	7	21	34	87	−53	23	Relegation to Nemzeti Bajnokság III
18	Zalaegerszegi Dózsa	36	5	6	25	29	80	−51	16	Relegation to Nemzeti Bajnokság III
19	Szekszárdi SC	36	5	3	28	39	115	−76	13	Relegation to Nemzeti Bajnokság III

=== Southern group ===
Pos	Team	Pld	W	D	L	GF	GA	GD	Pts	Promotion or relegation
1	Budapesti VSC	36	23	5	8	72	30	+42	51	Promotion to Nemzeti Bajnokság I
2	Ujpesti Tungsram TE	36	18	13	5	59	35	+24	49	
3	KISTEXT SK	36	21	5	10	106	42	+64	47	
4	Kecskeméti Dózsa SC	36	18	6	12	65	47	+18	42	
5	Szolnoki MÁV SE	36	16	8	12	59	42	+17	40	
6	Pénzügyőrök SE	36	14	12	10	55	46	+9	40	
7	Ceglédi Vasutas SE	36	14	11	11	48	59	−11	39	
8	Jászberényi Vasas	36	13	10	13	43	35	+8	36	
9	Váci Petőfi SE	36	13	9	14	52	58	−6	35	
10	Szegedi VSE	36	14	5	17	42	46	−4	33	
11	Gázművek MTE	36	12	9	15	45	58	−13	33	Relegation to Nemzeti Bajnokság III
12	Gyulai MEDOSZ	36	12	9	15	37	59	−22	33	Relegation to Nemzeti Bajnokság III
13	Makói Vasas	36	12	7	17	48	59	−11	31	Relegation to Nemzeti Bajnokság III
14	Békéscsabai Előre Építők SK	36	12	7	17	52	65	−13	31	Relegation to Nemzeti Bajnokság III
15	Kőbányai Lombik TK	36	11	9	16	44	60	−16	31	Relegation to Nemzeti Bajnokság III
16	Budapesti Vörös Meteor	36	12	6	18	42	60	−18	30	Relegation to Nemzeti Bajnokság III
17	Villamosforgó és Kábelgyár SE	36	10	9	17	54	61	−7	29	Relegation to Nemzeti Bajnokság III
18	Bajai Építők	36	10	9	17	39	66	−27	29	Relegation to Nemzeti Bajnokság III
19	Budapesti Petőfi SC	36	11	3	22	45	79	−34	25	Relegation to Nemzeti Bajnokság III

=== Eastern group ===
Pos	Team	Pld	W	D	L	GF	GA	GD	Pts	Promotion or relegation
1	Miskolci VSC	36	22	10	4	63	21	+42	54	Promotion to Nemzeti Bajnokság I
2	Debreceni VSC	36	22	7	7	69	18	+51	51	
3	Budapesti Spartacus SC	36	20	9	7	72	36	+36	49	
4	Budapesti Előre SC	36	15	13	8	49	33	+16	43	
5	Bükkaljai Bányász	36	16	9	11	51	52	−1	41	
6	Szállítók SE	36	16	8	12	63	36	+27	40	
7	Miskolci MTE	36	15	10	11	52	39	+13	40	
8	Salgótarjáni SE	36	14	11	11	53	47	+6	39	
9	Csepel Autó SK	36	15	7	14	53	51	+2	37	
10	Egyetértés SC	36	15	7	14	48	53	−5	37	
11	Ózd Vasas TK	36	13	10	13	50	44	+6	36	
12	Nagybátonyi Bányász	36	10	15	11	57	54	+3	35	Relegation to Nemzeti Bajnokság III
13	Egri SC	36	13	8	15	48	61	−13	34	Relegation to Nemzeti Bajnokság III
14	Baglyasaljai Bányász SE	36	12	8	16	39	61	−22	32	Relegation to Nemzeti Bajnokság III
15	Nyíregyházi Építők	36	9	13	14	36	44	−8	31	Relegation to Nemzeti Bajnokság III
16	Hatvani Vasutas SE	36	10	7	19	43	67	−24	27	Relegation to Nemzeti Bajnokság III
17	MÁVAG SK	36	9	7	20	49	66	−17	25	Relegation to Nemzeti Bajnokság III
18	Debreceni Honvéd SE	36	3	13	20	26	79	−53	19	Relegation to Nemzeti Bajnokság III
19	Perecesi TK	36	5	4	27	34	93	−59	14	Relegation to Nemzeti Bajnokság III

== See also ==
- 1955–58 Magyar Kupa
- 1957–58 Nemzeti Bajnokság I
