= 1983–84 Nemzeti Bajnokság III =

Nemzeti Bajnokság III
- Season: 1983–84
- Champions: Tapolcai Bauxitbányász SE (Bakony); Kaposvári Rákóczi SC (Dráva); Dunaújvárosi Kohász SE (Duna); DÉLÉP SC (Kőrös); Váci Izzó MTE (Mátra); Jászberényi Lehel SE (Tisza)
- Promoted: Tapolcai Bauxitbányász SE (Bakony); Dunaújvárosi Kohász SE (Duna); Váci Izzó MTE (Mátra)

The 1983–84 Nemzeti Bajnokság III season was the 3rd edition of the Nemzeti Bajnokság III.

== League tables ==
=== Bakony group ===
Pos	Teams	Pld	W	D	L	GF	GA	GD	Pts	Promotion or relegation
1	Tapolcai Bauxitbányász SE	34	23	6	5	70	32	38	52	Advance to play-offs
2	Sabaria SE	34	20	9	5	65	29	36	49	
3	Ajkai Bányász SK	34	20	8	6	50	29	21	48	
4	Honvéd Katona SE	34	16	8	10	48	37	11	40	
5	Zirc-Dudari Bányász	34	14	11	9	46	37	9	39	
6	Ajkai Aluminium SK	34	14	9	11	67	52	15	37	
7	MOTIM TE	34	15	6	13	46	36	10	36	
8	Győri Dózsa SK	34	10	15	9	51	48	3	35	
9	Nike-Fűzfői AK	34	14	7	13	40	38	2	35	
10	Kapuvári SE	34	15	5	14	59	48	11	35	
11	Sárvári Kinizsi SE	34	13	6	15	49	45	4	32	
12	Péti MTE	34	11	9	14	43	45	-2	31	
13	Soproni Postás SK	34	10	10	14	45	51	-6	30	
14	MÁV DAC	34	8	13	13	50	52	-2	29	
15	MÁV Nagykanizsai TE	34	10	8	16	32	49	-17	28	
16	Répcelaki Bányász SE	34	9	8	17	36	66	-30	26	Relegation to Megyei Bajnokság I
17	Várpalotai Bányász SK	34	9	5	20	32	55	-23	23	Relegation to Megyei Bajnokság I
18	Kőszegi LATEX SE	34	0	7	27	25	105	-80	7	Relegation to Megyei Bajnokság I

=== Dráva group ===
Pos	Teams	Pld	W	D	L	GF	GA	GD	Pts	Promotion or relegation
1	Kaposvári Rákóczi SC	30	22	6	6	62	24	38	46	Advance to play-offs
2	Mohácsi TE	30	15	14	1	56	20	36	44	
3	Siklós	30	14	8	8	47	27	20	36	
4	Bonyhádi MSC	30	14	7	9	46	36	10	35	
5	Komlói Bányász SK	30	13	9	8	41	27	14	35	
6	Nagyatádi VSE	30	11	12	7	40	33	7	34	
7	Kisdorogi MEDOSZ SE	30	13	8	9	50	32	18	34	
8	Mázaszászvári Bányász	30	12	9	9	42	28	14	33	
9	Szigetvár	30	11	7	12	35	38	-3	29	
10	Sellyei SK	30	9	9	12	27	38	-11	27	
11	Bólyi MEDOSZ SE	30	7	13	10	35	41	-6	27	
12	Pécsi VSK	30	8	11	11	37	46	-9	27	
13	Honvéd Táncsics SE	30	10	6	14	35	45	-10	26	
14	Boglárlellei SE	30	9	5	16	46	63	-17	23	Relegation to Megyei Bajnokság I
15	Pécsi BTC	30	7	4	19	30	61	-31	18	Relegation to Megyei Bajnokság I
16	Nagymányoki Brikett SE	30	1	4	25	9	79	0	6	Relegation to Megyei Bajnokság I

=== Duna group ===
Pos	Teams	Pld	W	D	L	GF	GA	GD	Pts	Promotion or relegation
1	Dunaújvárosi Kohász SE	34	24	5	5	88	22	66	53	Advance to play-offs
2	Oroszlányi Bányász SK	34	20	9	5	90	32	58	49	
3	Ráckevei Aranykalász TSZ SK	34	18	12	4	60	34	26	48	
4	Dorogi AC	34	16	9	9	55	47	8	41	
5	Építők SC	34	16	8	10	51	34	17	40	
6	Dömsödi Dózsa TSZ SE	34	14	11	9	57	36	21	39	
7	Budafoki MTE	34	15	9	10	52	35	17	39	
8	Érdi VSE	34	13	12	9	63	43	20	38	
9	Esztergomi Vasas	34	15	8	11	58	34	24	38	
10	Pénzügyőr SE	34	13	11	10	54	40	14	37	
11	Vasas Ikarus SK	34	12	12	10	52	52	0	36	
12	Honvéd Rákóczi SE	34	11	13	10	42	47	-5	35	
13	Magyar Viscosa SE	34	11	10	13	41	46	-5	32	
14	Kossuth KFSE	34	10	10	14	48	52	-4	30	
15	Testnevelési Főiskola SE	34	8	9	17	42	64	-22	25	Relegation to Megyei Bajnokság I
16	Székesfehérvári MÁV Előre SC	34	8	1	25	34	84	-50	17	Relegation to Megyei Bajnokság I
17	Szigetszentmiklósi TK	34	3	3	28	27	112	-85	9	Relegation to Megyei Bajnokság I
18	Székesfehérvári Ikarus	34	3	0	31	30	130	-100	6	Relegation to Megyei Bajnokság I

=== Kőrös group ===
Pos	Teams	Pld	W	D	L	GF	GA	GD	Pts	Promotion or relegation
1	DÉLÉP SC	30	19	5	6	49	23	26	43	Advance to play-offs
2	BKV Előre SC	30	17	8	5	65	23	42	42	
3	Gyulai SE	30	16	9	5	61	45	16	41	
4	Békési SE	30	15	9	6	42	30	12	39	
5	Orosházi MTK	30	12	11	7	35	25	10	35	
6	Lajosmizsei KSK	30	11	12	7	39	36	3	34	
7	Szarvasi Főiskola Spartacus SC	30	13	8	9	53	30	23	34	
8	Szegedi Dózsa SE	30	10	12	8	48	38	10	32	
9	Kecskeméti TE	30	10	9	11	50	59	-9	29	
10	Honvéd Kun Béla SE	30	9	10	11	39	37	2	28	
11	Szegedi VSE	30	7	10	13	32	46	-14	24	
12	Nagyszénási TSZSE	30	8	7	15	29	56	-27	23	
13	Tisza Cipő SE	30	5	12	13	32	46	-14	22	
14	Szentesi Vízmű SK	30	7	7	16	25	43	-18	21	Relegation to Megyei Bajnokság I
15	Kiskunhalasi AC MEDOSZ	30	5	7	18	30	60	-30	17	Relegation to Megyei Bajnokság I
16	Határőr Dózsa SE	30	5	6	19	31	63	-32	16	Relegation to Megyei Bajnokság I

=== Mátra group ===
Pos	Teams	Pld	W	D	L	GF	GA	GD	Pts	Promotion or relegation
1	Váci Izzó MTE	30	24	4	2	72	9	63	52	Advance to play-offs
2	Honvéd Papp József SE	30	18	6	6	64	39	25	42	
3	Salgótarjáni Síküveg	30	13	9	8	52	37	15	35	
4	Bélapátfalvai Építők	30	10	14	6	35	36	-1	34	
5	Hatvani KVSC	30	12	8	10	48	43	5	32	
6	Borsodi Volán	30	11	10	9	53	46	7	32	
7	Gyöngyösi SE	30	11	8	11	45	41	4	30	
8	Edelényi Bányász	30	10	10	10	35	31	4	30	
9	Budapesti VSC	30	11	6	13	51	43	8	28	
10	Borsodnádasdi Kohász	30	9	10	11	33	50	-17	28	
11	Nagybátonyi Bányász SC	30	11	6	13	45	46	-1	28	
12	Recski Ércbányász	30	11	4	15	37	45	-8	26	
13	Sajóbábonyi Vegyész	30	9	8	13	29	43	-14	26	
14	Borsodi Bányász SE	30	7	11	12	27	34	-7	25	
15	Balassagyarmati SE	30	8	8	14	35	61	-26	24	Relegation to Megyei Bajnokság I
16	Petőfibányai Bányász	30	2	4	24	19	76	-57	8	

=== Tisza group ===
Pos	Teams	Pld	W	D	L	GF	GA	GD	Pts	Promotion or relegation
1	Jászberényi Lehel SE	30	22	3	5	66	20	46	47	Advance to play-offs
2	Olefin SC	30	17	5	8	59	33	26	39	
3	Hajdúböszörményi Bocskai SE	30	15	8	7	50	35	15	38	
4	Rákóczifalvai TSZ SE	30	17	4	9	55	36	19	38	
5	Debreceni Universitas SE	30	13	8	9	48	35	13	34	
6	Püspökladányi MÁV Egyetértés SE	30	13	7	10	45	37	8	33	
7	Balmazújvárosi Lenin TSZ SE	30	13	6	11	40	31	9	32	
8	Honvéd Bem József SE	30	12	5	13	34	42	-8	29	
9	Rakamazi Spartacus SE	30	13	2	15	39	51	-12	28	
10	Mátészalkai MTK	30	12	4	14	30	43	-13	28	
11	Kisvárdai SE	30	10	7	13	32	41	-9	27	
12	Baktalórántházi TSz SE	30	10	7	13	33	40	-7	27	
13	Jászkiséri TSz SE	30	10	6	14	37	44	-7	26	
14	Hajdúszoboszlói Bocskai SE	30	9	7	14	39	49	-10	25	Relegation to Megyei Bajnokság I
15	Tiszavasvári Lombik	30	6	8	16	38	56	-18	20	Relegation to Megyei Bajnokság I
16	Debreceni Volán SC	30	2	5	23	26	78	-52	9	Relegation to Megyei Bajnokság I

== Promotion play-offs ==
Playoff 1
Home	Result	Away
Tapolcai Bauxitbányász SE	3–1	Jászberényi Lehel SE
Jászberényi Lehel SE	2–1	Tapolcai Bauxitbányász SE

Playoff 2
Home	Result	Away
Váci Izzó MTE	4–1	Kaposvári Rákóczi SC
Kaposvári Rákóczi SC	1–0	Váci Izzó MTE

Playoff 3
Home	Result	Away
Délép SC	2–1	Dunaújvárosi Kohász SE
Dunaújvárosi Kohász SE	2–0	Délép SC

== See also ==
- 1983–84 Magyar Kupa
- 1983–84 Nemzeti Bajnokság I
- 1983–84 Nemzeti Bajnokság II
