= 1959–60 Nemzeti Bajnokság III =

Nemzeti Bajnokság III
- Season: 1959–60
- Champions: Ganz-MÁVAG Vasas SE (Northwest); Pécsi BTC (Southwest); Kőbányai Lombik TK (North); Elektromos SE (North-centre); Nyíregyházi Spartacus SK (Northeast); Ceglédi VSE (Southeast)
- Promoted: Ganz-MÁVAG Vasas SE (Northwest); Pécsi BTC (Southwest); Kőbányai Lombik TK (North); Elektromos SE (North-centre); Nyíregyházi Spartacus SK (Northeast); Ceglédi VSE (Southeast)

The 1960–61 Nemzeti Bajnokság III season was the 10th edition of the Nemzeti Bajnokság III.

== League tables ==
=== Northwestern group ===
Pos	Teams	Pld	W	D	L	GF	GA	GD	Pts	Promotion or relegation
1	Ganz-MÁVAG Vasas SE	30	24	4	2	83	18	65	52	Promotion to Nemzeti Bajnokság II
2	Soproni Vasutas SE	30	17	6	7	73	37	36	40	
3	KISTEXT SK	30	16	7	7	72	40	32	39	
4	Várpalotai Bányász SK	30	14	7	9	47	38	9	35	
5	Szombathelyi Cipőgyári SE	30	14	7	9	47	52	-5	35	
6	Győri Dózsa SK	30	15	4	11	56	50	6	34	
7	Szombathelyi Pamutipar SC	30	13	4	13	52	54	-2	30	
8	Soproni SOTEX SE	30	10	9	11	37	39	-2	29	
9	Almásfüzitői Olajmunkás SC	30	11	7	12	29	46	-17	29	
10	Nagykanizsai Bányász SK	30	11	5	14	51	51	0	27	
11	Szombathelyi Vasas SE	30	13	1	16	52	56	-4	27	
12	Kapuvári SE	30	9	9	12	38	41	-3	27	
13	Pápai MÁV Petőfi	30	11	5	14	46	57	-11	27	Relegation to Megyei Bajnokság I
14	Veszprémi Vasas TC	30	9	6	15	37	53	-16	24	Relegation to Megyei Bajnokság I
15	Lovászi Bányász SK	30	4	6	20	25	76	-51	14	Relegation to Megyei Bajnokság I
16	Bázakerettyei Bányász SK	30	4	3	23	35	72	-37	11	Relegation to Megyei Bajnokság I
17	Szombathelyi Haladás II 1	32	17	6	9	91	66	25	40	

Note

1. did not officially participate in the championship; therefore, the results are not included.

=== Southwestern group ===
Pos	Teams	Pld	W	D	L	GF	GA	GD	Pts	Promotion or relegation
1	Pécsi BTC	30	16	8	6	69	39	30	40	Promotion to Nemzeti Bajnokság II
2	Kaposvári Kinizsi SK	30	17	4	9	56	31	25	38	
3	Csepel Autó	30	17	4	9	68	41	27	38	
4	Bajai Építők	30	15	7	8	62	40	22	37	
5	Kiskunhalasi Határőr Dózsa SK	30	15	6	9	59	41	18	36	
6	Bajai Bácska Posztó	30	14	6	10	40	35	5	34	
7	Pécsi Bányász SK	30	13	5	12	64	46	18	31	
8	Kaposvári Dózsa SK	30	13	5	12	49	49	0	31	
9	Székesfehérvári MÁV Előre SC	30	14	2	14	57	51	6	30	
10	Bonyhádi Vasas SK	30	14	2	14	41	52	-11	30	
11	Kiskunhalasi MEDOSZ	30	12	5	13	58	48	10	29	
12	Pécsi Vasas SK	30	10	9	11	50	48	2	29	
13	Szekszárdi Petőfi	30	11	7	12	42	43	-1	29	Relegation to Megyei Bajnokság I
14	Bácsalmási Petőfi SK	30	11	6	13	43	61	-18	28	Relegation to Megyei Bajnokság I
15	Komlói Béta-akna Bányász SK	30	3	5	22	28	81	-53	11	Relegation to Megyei Bajnokság I
16	Dombóvári Spartacus SK	30	3	3	24	26	106	-80	9	Relegation to Megyei Bajnokság I
17	Pécsi Dózsa II. 1	32	21	3	8	106	47	59	45	

Note

1. did not officially participate in the championship; therefore, the results are not included.

=== Northern group ===
Pos	Teams	Pld	W	D	L	GF	GA	GD	Pts	Promotion or relegation
1	Kőbányai Lombik TK	30	19	6	5	66	29	37	44	Promotion to Nemzeti Bajnokság II
2	Salgótarjáni Kohász SE	30	18	5	7	69	32	37	41	
3	Vasas Ikarus SK	30	15	7	8	48	34	14	37	
4	Gázművek MTE	30	14	8	8	71	51	20	36	
5	Baglyasaljai Bányász	30	14	6	10	53	32	21	34	
6	Kisterenyei Bányász	30	11	11	8	36	34	2	33	
7	Gyöngyösi Spartacus SC	30	12	7	11	55	51	4	31	
8	Zagyvapálfalvai Építők SK	30	11	8	11	45	42	3	30	
9	Autótaxi	30	10	9	11	47	47	0	29	
10	Vasas Generátor SK	30	11	7	12	28	37	-9	29	
11	Goldberger SE	30	12	4	14	41	47	-6	28	
12	Vasas Dinamó SK	30	9	9	12	30	52	-22	27	
13	Budatétényi Mechanika	30	8	10	12	37	59	-22	26	Relegation to Megyei Bajnokság I
14	Hatvani Vasutas SE	30	8	9	13	33	58	-25	25	Relegation to Megyei Bajnokság I
15	Petőfibányai Bányász SK	30	4	9	17	24	52	-28	17	Relegation to Megyei Bajnokság I
16	Józsefvárosi Szállítók	30	5	3	22	37	63	-26	13	Relegation to Megyei Bajnokság I
17	Salgótarjáni BTC II. 1	32	22	7	3	84	32	52	51	

Note:

1. did not officially participate in the championship; therefore, the results are not included.

=== Northcentral group ===
Pos	Teams	Pld	W	D	L	GF	GA	GD	Pts	Promotion or relegation
1	Elektromos SE	30	20	5	5	84	35	49	45	Promotion to Nemzeti Bajnokság II
2	Vörös Csillag Traktorgyár SK	30	19	5	6	68	35	33	43	
3	Nyergesújfalui Viscosa SE	30	12	11	7	44	28	16	35	
4	Budapesti Helyiipari SC	30	11	12	7	40	31	9	34	
5	Sárisápi Bányász SK	30	14	4	12	46	39	7	32	
6	Tokodi Bányász SK	30	15	2	13	49	42	7	32	
7	Törekvés SE	30	14	4	12	53	55	-2	32	
8	Újlaki FC	30	12	7	11	48	46	2	31	
9	Annavölgyi Bányász	30	12	7	11	47	49	-2	31	
10	III. kerületi TTVE	30	13	5	12	42	50	-8	31	
11	Pilisi Bányász SK	30	13	4	13	47	42	5	30	
12	Kerámia SC	30	13	2	15	66	43	23	28	
13	Testvériség SE	30	11	4	15	44	46	-2	26	Relegation to Megyei Bajnokság I
14	Budapesti Petőfi	30	10	4	16	49	78	-29	24	Relegation to Megyei Bajnokság I
15	Ercsi Kinizsi	30	6	4	20	39	77	-38	16	Relegation to Megyei Bajnokság I
16	Pilisi Kinizsi SK	30	3	4	23	28	98	-70	10	Relegation to Megyei Bajnokság I

=== Northeastern group ===
Pos	Teams	Pld	W	D	L	GF	GA	GD	Pts	Promotion or relegation
1	Nyíregyházi Spartacus SK	30	19	8	3	66	24	42	46	Promotion to Nemzeti Bajnokság II
2	Egri Vasas	30	14	9	7	44	28	16	37	
3	Debreceni Egyetemi AC	30	13	10	7	48	31	17	36	
4	Egercsehi Bányász SK	30	13	9	8	36	31	5	35	
5	Debreceni Kinizsi	30	12	9	9	42	44	-2	33	
6	Miskolci MTE	30	11	10	9	50	37	13	32	
7	Miskolci Bányász SK	30	13	6	11	50	42	8	32	
8	Somsályi Bányász	30	12	7	11	43	45	-2	31	
9	Tiszalöki Vörös Meteor	30	11	8	11	46	48	-2	30	
10	Debreceni Gördülőcsapágy-gyári Vasas	30	10	8	12	36	39	-3	28	
11	Debreceni Honvéd	30	10	7	13	46	50	-4	27	
12	Püspökladányi MÁV	30	11	4	15	36	45	-9	26	
13	Nyírmadai MEDOSZ	30	10	5	15	42	70	-28	25	Relegation to Megyei Bajnokság I
14	Putnoki Bányász TK	30	9	6	15	35	52	-17	24	Relegation to Megyei Bajnokság I
15	Nyíregyházi SZSE	30	7	6	17	38	51	-13	20	Relegation to Megyei Bajnokság I
16	Ormosbányai Bányász SK	30	6	6	18	39	60	-21	18	Relegation to Megyei Bajnokság I
17	Diósgyőri VTK II. 1	32	17	5	10	98	62	36	39	

Note:

1. did not officially participate in the championship; therefore, the results are not included.

=== Southeastern group ===
Pos	Teams	Pld	W	D	L	GF	GA	GD	Pts	Promotion or relegation
1	Ceglédi VSE	30	17	7	6	55	24	31	41	Promotion to Nemzeti Bajnokság II
2	Szegedi Spartacus-Vasas SC	30	16	7	7	48	33	15	39	
3	Gyulai MEDOSZ	30	15	5	10	56	32	24	35	
4	Békéscsabai Építők	30	13	9	8	57	41	16	35	
5	Törökszentmiklósi Fáklya SK	30	13	8	9	40	46	-6	34	
6	Szolnoki MTE	30	12	8	10	41	31	10	32	
7	Szegedi Építők SK	30	10	10	10	59	52	7	30	
8	Martfűi Tisza Cipőgyári MSE	30	13	4	13	43	39	4	30	
9	Kecskeméti TE	30	11	8	11	35	32	3	30	
10	Szarvasi SC	30	11	8	11	48	52	-4	30	
11	MÁV Hódmezővásárhelyi MTE	30	10	9	11	46	48	-2	29	
12	Makói Vasas	30	7	13	10	43	45	-2	27	
13	Mezőkovácsházi Petőfi TE	30	9	6	15	39	45	-6	24	Relegation to Megyei Bajnokság I
14	Békéscsabai MÁV Bocskai	30	7	9	14	24	49	-25	23	Relegation to Megyei Bajnokság I
15	Nagykőrösi Kinizsi SK	30	7	8	15	32	63	-31	22	Relegation to Megyei Bajnokság I
16	Móravárosi Kinizsi	30	6	7	17	32	66	-34	19	Relegation to Megyei Bajnokság I
17	Szegedi EAC II. 1	32	18	7	7	80	40	40	43	

Note:

1. did not officially participate in the championship; therefore, the results are not included.

== See also ==
- 1959–60 Magyar Kupa
- 1959–60 Nemzeti Bajnokság I
- 1959–60 Nemzeti Bajnokság II
