= 1959–60 Nemzeti Bajnokság II =

Nemzeti Bajnokság II
- Season: 1959–60
- Champions: Győri Vasas ETO (West); Debreceni VSC (East)
- Promoted: Győri Vasas ETO (West); Debreceni VSC (East)
- Relegated: Pécsi VSK (West); Kaposvári MTE (West); Pápai Textiles SE (West); Nagybátonyi Bányász SC (East); Vasas Izzó SC (East); Orosházi Kinizsi SK (East)

The 1960–61 Nemzeti Bajnokság II was the 61st season of the Nemzeti Bajnokság II, the second tier of the Hungarian football league.

== League table ==
=== Western group ===
Pos	Team	Pld	W	D	L	GF	GA	GD	Pts	Promotion or relegation
1	Győri Vasas ETO	30	24	3	3	69	14	+55	51	Promotion to Nemzeti Bajnokság I
2	FŐSPED Szállítók SE	30	16	8	6	52	23	+29	40	
3	Komlói Bányász SK	30	16	6	8	57	34	+23	38	
4	Székesfehérvári Vasas SC	30	16	1	13	63	44	+19	33	
5	Budafoki MTE-Kinizsi SK	30	13	6	11	31	31	0	32	
6	Mosonmagyaróvári TE	30	13	5	12	39	45	−6	31	
7	Láng Vasas SK	30	11	8	11	31	34	−3	30	
8	Budai Spartacus	30	11	6	13	42	47	−5	28	
9	Oroszlányi Bányász SK	30	10	8	12	39	46	−7	28	
10	Erzsébeti Vasas TK	30	11	5	14	34	43	−9	27	
11	Zalaegerszegi TE	30	9	9	12	27	41	−14	27	
12	Sztálinvárosi Kohász SE	30	10	6	14	47	46	+1	26	
13	Váci Petőfi	30	10	6	14	32	42	−10	26	
14	Pécsi Vasutas SK	30	9	8	13	37	51	−14	26	Relegation to Nemzeti Bajnokság III
15	Kaposvári MTE	30	7	5	18	36	61	−25	19	Relegation to Nemzeti Bajnokság III
16	Pápai Textiles	30	6	6	18	21	55	−34	18	Relegation to Nemzeti Bajnokság III

=== Eastern group ===
Pos	Team	Pld	W	D	L	GF	GA	GD	Pts	Promotion or relegation
1	Debreceni VSC	30	16	11	3	60	24	+36	43	Promotion to Nemzeti Bajnokság I
2	Kecskeméti Dózsa SK	30	16	8	6	48	19	+29	40	
3	Szegedi VSE	30	15	6	9	39	30	+9	36	
4	VM Egyetértés	30	15	4	11	36	28	+8	34	
5	Ózdi Kohász SE	30	13	8	9	44	35	+9	34	
6	Pénzügyőrök SE	30	13	6	11	40	33	+7	32	
7	Borsodi Bányász SK	30	13	6	11	34	35	−1	32	
8	Szolnoki MÁV SE	30	11	9	10	42	37	+5	31	
9	Miskolci VSC	30	12	6	12	43	41	+2	30	
10	Jászberényi Vasas SC	30	11	7	12	39	46	−7	29	
11	Diósgyőri Bányász SC	30	11	7	12	32	50	−18	29	
12	Budapesti Előre	30	8	12	10	43	43	0	28	
13	Budapesti Spartacus SC	30	9	4	17	41	49	−8	22	
14	Nagybátonyi Bányász SC	30	8	6	16	29	46	−17	22	Relegation to Nemzeti Bajnokság III
15	Vasas Izzó SC	30	7	5	18	37	63	−26	19	Relegation to Nemzeti Bajnokság III
16	Orosházi Kinizsi SK	30	5	9	16	33	61	−28	19	Relegation to Nemzeti Bajnokság III

== See also ==
- 1959–60 Magyar Kupa
- 1959–60 Nemzeti Bajnokság I
- 1959–60 Nemzeti Bajnokság III
