= 1987–88 OB I bajnoksag season =

Hungarian ice hockey season

The 1987–88 OB I bajnokság season was the 51st season of the OB I bajnokság, the top level of ice hockey in Hungary. Seven teams participated in the league, and Ujpesti Dozsa SC won the championship.

== Regular season ==
	Club	GP	W	T	L	Goals	Pts
1.	Újpesti Dózsa SC	24	21	2	1	241:55	44
2.	Ferencvárosi TC	24	21	0	3	175:53	42
3.	Alba Volán Székesfehérvár	24	12	1	11	110:96	25
4.	Miskolci Kinizsi	24	10	1	13	77:99	20*
5.	Dunaújvárosi Kohász	24	9	1	14	82:170	18*
6.	Jászberényi Lehel SE	24	6	1	17	65:141	13
7.	Liget SE Budapest	24	2	0	22	53:189	3*

== Playoffs ==
=== 5th place ===
- Dunaújvárosi Kohász - Jászberényi Lehel SE 2:7/1:7

=== 3rd place ===
- Alba Volán Székesfehérvár - Miskolci Kinizsi 2:0/6:2

=== Final ===
- Újpesti Dózsa SC - Ferencvárosi TC 2:1 (2:1, 4:5, 7:0)
