= 1965 Nemzeti Bajnokság II =

Nemzeti Bajnokság II
- Season: 1965
- Champions: Dunaújvárosi Kohász SE
- Promoted: Dunaújvárosi Kohász SE (winners); Diósgyőri VTK (runners-up); Szombathelyi Haladás
- Relegated: Lehel SC; III. Kerületi TVE

The 1965 Nemzeti Bajnokság II was the 67th season of the Nemzeti Bajnokság II, the second tier of the Hungarian football league.

== League table ==
Pos	Team	Pld	W	D	L	GF	GA	GD	Pts	Promotion or relegation
1	Dunaújvárosi Kohász SE	30	17	8	5	43	25	+18	42	Promotion to Nemzeti Bajnokság I
2	Diósgyőri VTK	30	15	8	7	38	19	+19	38	Promotion to Nemzeti Bajnokság I
3	Szombathelyi Haladás	30	17	4	9	59	30	+29	38	
4	VM Egyetértés	30	14	10	6	40	33	+7	38	
5	FŐSPED Szállítók SE	30	11	11	8	47	35	+12	33	
6	Miskolci VSC	30	12	9	9	38	33	+5	33	
7	Ganz-MÁVAG SE	30	13	6	11	35	33	+2	32	
8	Budapesti VSC	30	10	9	11	38	34	+4	29	
9	Budafoki MTE-Kinizsi	30	9	10	11	26	23	+3	28	
10	Győri MÁV DAC	30	10	8	12	40	48	−8	28	
11	Nyíregyházi Spartacus	30	12	4	14	28	51	−23	28	
12	Székesfehérvári VT Vasas	30	9	9	12	39	34	+5	27	
13	Oroszlányi Bányász SK	30	10	7	13	37	36	+1	27	
14	Debreceni VSC	30	10	7	13	35	36	−1	27	
15	Lehel SC Jászberény	30	7	4	19	28	64	−36	18	Relegation to Nemzeti Bajnokság III
16	III. kerületi TTVE	30	3	8	19	30	67	−37	14	Relegation to Nemzeti Bajnokság III

== See also ==
- 1965 Magyar Kupa
- 1965 Nemzeti Bajnokság I
