= Diósgyőri Bányász SC =

Hungarian football club

Diósgyőri Bányász Sport Club
- Full name: Diósgyőri Bányász Sport Club
- Founded: 1946
- Dissolved: 1961
Home colours

Diósgyőri Bányász Sport Club is a defunct professional football club based in Miskolc, Hungary.

== History ==
Diósgyőri Bányász Sport Club was estbalished in 1946 as Haricavölgyi TK. Later the club their name to Diósgyőri Tárna. In 1950, the club united with several smaller miner clubs to form Diósgyőri Bányász. The club played their home matches on Levente square.

Diósgyőri Bányász Sport Club won the Northern group of the 1957–58 Nemzeti Bajnokság III. However, the club did not gain promotion to the second division. In the following season, Diósgyőri Bányász won the 1958–59 Nemzeti Bajnokság III season and this time they also gained promotion to the second division. The club spent two consecutive seasons in the second tier. In the 1960–61 Nemzeti Bajnokság II season, they finished in the 15th position and were relegated to the third division.

In 1961, the club merged with Miskolci Bányász.

== Name changes ==
- Haricavölgyi TK: ? - 1949
- 1949: merger with smaller clubs related to mining
- Diósgyőri Tárna: 1949–1951
- Diósgyőri Bányász SK: 1951–1961
- 1961: merger with Miskolci Bányász

== Honours ==
=== League ===
- Nemzeti Bajnokság III:
  - Winners (1): 1957–58, 1958–59

== Seasons ==
The table below shows the seasons of Diósgyőri Bányász SC.

Season	Tier	Club's name	Position	Pts
1946–47	5	Haricavölgyi TK	0 / 10	
1947–48	5	Haricavölgyi TK	0 / 13	
1948–49	5	Haricavölgyi TK	4 / 12	28
1949–50	6	Diósgyőri Tárna	6 / 12	24
1950	5	Diósgyőri Tárna	4 / 14	17
1951	3	Diósgyőri Bányász	7 / 14	28
1952	3	Diósgyőri Bányász	12 / 14	16
1953	3	Diósgyőri Bányász	4 / 14	38
1954	3	Diósgyőri Bányász	1 / 14	46
1955	3	Diósgyőri Bányász	4 / 14	28
1956	3	Diósgyőri Bányász	8 / 16	27
1957	3	Diósgyőri Bányász	1 / 6	16
1957–58	3	Diósgyőri Bányász	1 / 16	44
1958–59	3	Diósgyőri Bányász	1 / 16	43
1959–60	2	Diósgyőri Bányász	11 / 16	29
1960–61	2	Diósgyőri Bányász	15 / 16	22
