= 1964 Nemzeti Bajnokság I =

Annual Hungarian soccer tournament

Nemzeti Bajnokság I
- Season: 1964
- Country: Hungary
- Teams: 14
- Champions: Ferencvárosi TC
- Runner up: Budapesti Honvéd SE
- Relegated: Debreceni VSC; Diósgyőri VTK
- Top goalscorer: Ferenc Bene
- All statistics correct as of 16 August 2026.

The 1964 season was the 62nd completed season of Nemzeti Bajnokság I.

== Overview ==
It was contested by 14 teams, and Ferencvárosi TC won the championship.

== League standings ==
Pos	Team	Pld	W	D	L	GF	GA	GR	Pts
1	Ferencvárosi TC	26	19	3	4	58	27	2.148	41
2	Budapest Honvéd SE	26	17	4	5	62	31	2.000	38
3	Tatabányai Bányász SC	26	13	8	5	49	28	1.750	34
4	Győri Vasas ETO	26	12	9	5	38	25	1.520	33
5	Újpesti Dózsa SC	26	14	5	7	53	38	1.395	33
6	Vasas SC	26	12	7	7	44	31	1.419	31
7	MTK	26	11	5	10	42	47	0.894	27
8	Dorogi Bányász SC	26	7	9	10	31	33	0.939	23
9	Csepel SC	26	9	2	15	30	42	0.714	20
10	Szegedi EAC	26	6	8	12	33	47	0.702	20
11	Pécsi Dózsa SC	26	4	10	12	29	37	0.784	18
12	Komlói Bányász SK	26	5	8	13	20	49	0.408	18
13	Debreceni VSC	26	5	4	17	24	54	0.444	14
14	Diósgyőri VTK	26	4	6	16	14	38	0.368	14

Source: rsssf.com

== Results ==
Home \ Away	CSE	DEB	DIÓ	DOR	FTC	GYŐ	HON	KOM	MTK	PÉC	SZE	TAT	ÚJP	VAS
Csepel		3–0	1–0	3–2	0–2	0–1	1–0	1–1	2–1	0–3	4–2	2–3	1–2	2–0
Debrecen	4–0		1–0	2–3	0–3	0–2	1–3	4–0	1–2	0–2	0–1	1–0	0–3	0–0
Diósgyőr	2–4	0–1		2–1	0–2	0–1	1–1	0–1	0–2	1–0	1–0	1–1	1–0	0–1
Dorogi Bányász	0–0	2–1	0–0		1–2	2–1	1–2	3–1	2–0	3–3	0–0	0–0	2–1	0–2
Ferencváros	3–1	2–0	4–0	3–2		0–0	2–1	2–0	2–0	3–2	3–0	6–1	4–1	0–3
Győr	3–0	2–2	0–0	1–0	2–2		2–2	2–0	3–1	0–0	3–1	0–1	5–1	3–0
Budapest Honvéd	2–1	5–0	2–0	0–0	4–1	0–1		3–0	6–1	7–3	1–0	2–1	3–2	4–3
Komlói Bányász	1–0	1–0	1–1	0–0	0–3	1–0	0–2		2–4	0–0	2–2	0–0	2–2	2–1
MTK Budapest	2–1	2–1	2–0	2–1	1–2	1–1	3–5	3–0		3–2	1–1	0–0	2–1	2–6
Pécsi Dózsa	0–1	1–1	1–1	1–2	1–1	0–1	0–0	1–0	1–1		3–0	0–1	2–2	0–2
Szegedi EAC	2–0	2–2	1–0	2–1	1–2	2–2	1–2	2–2	2–1	0–0		1–2	3–5	2–2
Tatabányai Bányász	2–0	6–1	4–1	1–1	0–1	5–0	2–1	5–1	2–2	5–3	4–2		2–0	0–0
Újpesti Dózsa	2–1	8–1	3–1	1–0	4–2	3–1	3–2	2–0	1–0	1–0	4–2	0–0		1–1
Vasas	2–1	1–0	3–1	2–2	2–1	1–1	1–2	6–2	2–3	1–0	0–1	2–1	0–0	

Source: rsssf.com
Legend: Blue = home team win; Yellow = draw; Red = away team win.

== Statistical leaders ==
=== Top goalscorers ===
Rank	Scorer	Club	Goals
1	(Hungary) Ferenc Bene	Újpesti Dózsa	28
1	(Hungary) Lajos Tichy	Budapest Honvéd	28
3	(Hungary) Flórián Albert	Ferencvárosi TC	20
4	(Hungary) Tibor Csernai	Tatabányai Bányász	19
5	(Hungary) István Kuti	MTK Budapest	17
6	(Hungary) János Farkas	Vasas SC	14
6	(Hungary) Lajos Puskás	Vasas SC	14
8	(Hungary) Tivadar Monostori	Dorogi Bányász	12
8	(Hungary) Antal Szuromi	Dorogi Bányász	12
10	(Hungary) Iván Menczel	Tatabányai Bányász	11

== Attendances ==
No.	Club	Average
1	Ferencváros	43,462
2	MTK	27,929
3	Újpest	27,923
4	Honvéd	24,308
5	Vasas	16,000
6	Csepel	12,538
7	DVTK	11,692
8	Tatabánya Bányász	11,154
9	DVSC	10,923
10	Pécs	9,923
11	ETO	9,423
12	Szeged	7,538
13	Dorog	7,077
14	Komló	5,308

== See also ==
- 1964 Nemzeti Bajnokság II
- 1964 Nemzeti Bajnokság III
