= 1964 Nemzeti Bajnokság II =

Nemzeti Bajnokság II
- Season: 1964
- Champions: Salgótarjáni BTC
- Promoted: Salgótarjáni BTC (winners); Ózdi Kohász SE (runners-up); Oroszlányi Bányász SK
- Relegated: Borsodi Bányász; Láng Vasas SK

The 1964 Nemzeti Bajnokság II was the 66th season of the Nemzeti Bajnokság II, the second tier of the Hungarian football league.

== League table ==
Pos	Team	Pld	W	D	L	GF	GA	GD	Pts	Promotion or relegation
1	Salgótarjáni BTC	30	16	6	8	48	19	+29	38	Promotion to Nemzeti Bajnokság I
2	Ózdi Kohász SE	30	14	9	7	49	36	+13	37	Promotion to Nemzeti Bajnokság I
3	Oroszlányi Bányász SK	30	10	14	6	34	28	+6	34	
4	Szombathelyi Haladás	30	11	11	8	52	38	+14	33	
5	Dunaújvárosi Kohász SE	30	12	8	10	31	28	+3	32	
6	Székesfehérvári VT Vasas	30	8	14	8	38	37	+1	30	
7	Győri MÁV DAC	30	12	6	12	34	39	−5	30	
8	Budapesti VSC	30	10	9	11	32	32	0	29	
9	Nyíregyházi Spartacus	30	13	3	14	33	38	−5	29	
10	Ganz-MÁVAG SE	30	11	6	13	35	42	−7	28	
11	Miskolci VSC	30	10	8	12	31	39	−8	28	
12	VM Egyetértés	30	12	4	14	34	43	−9	28	
13	FŐSPED Szállítók SE	30	9	9	12	37	41	−4	27	
14	Budafoki MTE-Kinizsi	30	10	7	13	31	38	−7	27	
15	Borsodi Bányász SE	30	10	7	13	31	41	−10	27	Relegation to Nemzeti Bajnokság III
16	Láng Vasas SK	30	8	7	15	35	46	−11	23	Relegation to Nemzeti Bajnokság III

== See also ==
- 1964 Magyar Kupa
- 1964 Nemzeti Bajnokság I
