= Tapolcai Bauxitbányász SE =

Hungarian football club

Tapolcai BSE
- Full name: Tapolcai Bauxitbányász Sportegyesület
- Founded: 1947
- Dissolved: 2000
Home colours

Tapolcai Bauxitbányász SE is a defunct professional football club based in Tapolca, Veszprém County, Hungary.

== History ==
Tapolca won the 1983–84 Nemzeti Bajnokság III season and gained promotion to the second division.

== Name changes ==
- Sümegi Bauxit: 1947 – 1949
- Nyirádi Bauxit: 1949 – 1951
- Nyirádi Bányász: 1951 – 1955
- Nyirádi Szikra: 1955 – 1957
- Nyirádi Bányász: 1957
- Bakonyi Bauxit Bánya SK: 1957 – 1968
- Nyirádi Bauxitbányász SE: 1968 – 1969
- 1969: moved to Tapolca
- Tapolcai Bauxitbányász SE: 1969 – ?
- 1978: merger with MÁV Tapolcai IAC
- Tapolcai Bauxit Ifjúsági SE: ? – 1996
- Tapolcai Bauxit SE: 1996 – 2000

== Honours ==
=== League ===
- Nemzeti Bajnokság III:
  - Winners (1): 1983–84

== Seasons ==
The highest league that Tapolcai Bauxitbányász SE have ever played was the third division.

1999–2000	4	Tapolca Bauxit	8 / 16	39
1998–99	4	Tapolca Bauxit-Honvéd	13 / 16	35
1997–98	4	Tapolca	12 / 16	36
1996–97	3	Tapolcai Bauxit SE	13 / 16	30
1995–96	3	Tapolcai Bauxit Ifjúsági SE	10 / 16	37
1994–95	3	Tapolcai Bauxit Ifjúsági SE	5 / 16	45
1993–94	3	Tapolcai Bauxit Ifjúsági SE	5 / 16	36
1992–93	3	Tapolcai Bauxit Ifjúsági SE	11 / 16	23
1991–92	3	Tapolca	6 / 16	37
1990–91	3	Tapolca	9 / 16	31
1989–90	2	Tapolcai Bauxitbányász SE	15 / 16	22
1988–89	2	Tapolca Bauxitbányász SE	13 / 16	37
1987–88	3	Tapolca Bauxitbányász SE	2 / 18	53
1986–87	3	Tapolca Bauxitbányász SE	4 / 18	42
1985–86	3	Tapolca Bauxitbányász SE	6 / 18	40
1984–85	2	Tapolcai Bauxitbányász SE	20 / 20	17
1983–84	3	Tapolcai Bauxitbányász SE	1 / 18	52
1982–83	2	Tapolcai Bauxitbányász SE	19 / 20	29
1981–82	2	Tapolcai Bauxitbányász SE	2 / 16	41
1980–81	2	Tapolcai Bauxitbányász SE	6 / 20	44
1979–80	2	Bauxitbányász SE	12 / 20	33
1978–79	2	Tapolcai Bauxitbányász SE	5 / 20	40
1977–78	3	Bauxitbányász SE	3 / 20	49
1976–77	3	Bauxitbányász SE	8 / 20	42
1975–76	3	Bauxitbányász SE	10 / 19	35
1974–75	3	Bauxitbányász SE	8 / 20	37
1973–74	4	Bauxitbányász SE	3 / 16	40
1972–73	4	Bauxitbányász SE	2 / 16	47
1971–72	3	Tapolcai Bauxitbányász SE	15 / 16	25
1970–71	3	Bauxitbányász SE	5 / 16	34
1970 tavasz	3	Bauxitbányász SE	11 / 16	14
1969	3	Bauxitbányász SE	8 / 16	28
1968	4	Nyirádi Bauxitbányász SE	1 / 16	44
1967	5	Bakonyi Bauxit Bánya SE	1 / 16	45
1966	5	Bakonyi Bauxit Bánya SK	4 / 15	38
1965	5	Bakonyi Bauxit Bánya SK	3 / 18	36
1964	5	Bakonyi Bauxit Bánya SK	4 / 18	41
1963 ősz	5	Bakonyi Bauxit Bánya SK	7 / 18	21
1962–63	4	Bakonyi Bauxit Bánya SK	4 / 16	38
1961–62	4	Bakonyi Bauxit Bánya SK	4 / 16	42
1960–61	4	Bakonyi Bauxit Bánya SK	7 / 18	32
1959–60	4	Bakonyi Bauxit Bánya SK	2 / 17	44
1958–59	4	Bakonyi Bauxit Bánya SK Nyirád	3 / 16	40
1957–58	4	Bakonyi Bauxit Bánya SK	2 / 18	52
1957 tavasz	4	Nyirádi Bányász	2 / 8	14
1955	4	Nyirádi Szikra	5 / 12	29
1954	4	Nyirádi Bányász	4 / 10	23
1953	4	Nyirádi Bányász	2 / 12	34
1952	4	Nyirádi Bányász	0 / 11	
1951	4	Nyirádi Bányász	2 / 7	
1950 ősz	4	Nyirádi Bauxit	0 / 16	
1949–50	5	Nyirádi Bauxit	1 / 10	30
1948–49	5	Nyirádi Bauxit	6 / 9	11
