= Tibor Bodon =

Hungarian footballer (1931–2020)

Personal information
- Date of birth: 18 July 1931
- Place of birth: Salgótarján, Hungary
- Date of death: 26 March 2020 (aged 88)
- Place of death: Salgótarján, Hungary
- Position: Forward

Senior career*
Years	Team	Apps	(Gls)
1954–1964	Salgótarjáni BTC	122	(36)

International career
1958	Hungary	1	(0)
- * Club domestic league appearances and goals

Tibor Bodon (18 July 1931 – 26 March 2020) was a Hungarian football forward who played for Hungary. He also played for Salgótarjáni BTC.

== Personal life ==
Bodon died on 26 March 2020 in Salgótarján at the age of 88.
