= Pápai SE =

Hungarian football club

- Full name: Pápai SE
- Founded: 1930
- Dissolved: 1995
Home colours

Pápai Sportegyesület is a deunct professional football club based in Pápa, Veszprém County, Hungary.

== History ==
To trace the beginnings of Pápai SE's sports history, we must go back more than a hundred years. As early as 1900, we find written records of the activities of sports enthusiasts who had formed clubs.

Around the mid-1920s, soccer enthusiasts also began to make their presence known. These initial steps were followed by more organized efforts to form teams. At that time, the famous defender Zoltán Blum, a native of Pápa, was already playing soccer in the capital on Üllői út. In keeping with the customs of the era, the “footballists” from Pápa sought a patron—or, to use today's term, a sponsor—to help them become an official club.

The citizens of Pápa who wanted to play soccer found their patron in the Perutz brothers. At the turn of the century, the city was undergoing significant industrialization. In 1899, negotiations began between the Hungarian government and the Perutz Brothers company regarding the establishment of a textile factory in Pápa. The Perutz Brothers already had a successful track record spanning several decades in textile manufacturing, primarily in the Czech territories of the Austro-Hungarian Monarchy. The establishment of the factory was registered on March 10, 1901, at the Royal Court of Justice in Veszprém. Although the textile factory's operations came to a complete halt after World War I, they picked up again in the 1920s and were thriving by 1927. In 1928, a soccer team named PFC was formed among the factory workers. In 1930, the Perutz Factory Sports Club and its soccer team were established. By 1935, the team—playing under the name Perutz—was competing in the Transdanubian First Division, and by the early 1940s, it was playing in Nemzeti Bajnokság II.

In the second half of the 1940s, the Pápai Perutz SC soccer team was at the height of its popularity. Alajos Beschoner, an outstanding soccer player, was one of Perutz's greatest figures at that time; under his leadership, Perutz defeated Hungary's B national team 4–2 in 1946. In 1947, Beschoner was invited to join the Hungarian college national team, with which he participated in the World University Games in Paris and remained a key member of the team thereafter. In 1949, this team went on to win the World University Championship, where Gusztáv Sebes served as the national team's head coach and players such as Lantos, Henni, Puskás, and Kocsis played alongside Alajos Beschoner!

That same year, Beschoner was selected for the national team and even scored a header against the Austrian national team in Vienna. In 1950, he was signed by Budapesti Honvéd, but returned to Pápa after half a year.

Although the team's name changed over the following years—Vörös Lobogó, Pápai Textiles SE—thanks to its successes and the love for soccer in Pápa, crowds of fans flocked to the field every Sunday to celebrate their favorite team. The recent past has also brought name changes and reorganizations; Textiles became PSE, and then PELC.

Pápai SE won the western group of the 1957–58 Nemzeti Bajnokság III season. However, they were not promoted to the second division. A year later, Pápa could repeat their success by winning the 1958–59 Nemzeti Bajnokság III season. This time the club also gained promotion to the second division. Nevertheless, their debut ended with a relegation from the second league since Pápa finished in the last position in the western group of the 1959–60 Nemzeti Bajnokság II season. Pápai SE went bankrupt in 1995.

== Name changes ==
- 1922 – 1930: Pápai Football Club
- 1930 – 1950: Pápai Perutz Sport Club
- 1950 – 1951: Pápai Textiles SE
- 1951 – 1957: Pápai Vörös Lobogó SK
- 1957 – 1982: Pápai Textiles SE
- 1982 – 1995: Pápai SE

== Seasons ==
The table belows shows the seasons of Pápai SE.

Season	Tier	Club's name	Position	Pts
1922–23	3	Pápai FC	0 / 7	-
1923–24	3	Pápai FC	5 / 7	7
1924–25	3	Pápai FC	2 / 7	18
1925–26	3	Pápai FC	1 / 10	29
1926–27	3	Pápai FC	7 / 10	15
1927–28	3	Pápai FC	7 / 12	19
1928–29	3	Pápai FC	6 / 9	13
1929–30	3	Pápai FC	5 / 8	11
1930–31	3	Pápai Perutz SC	6 / 8	11
1931–32	3	Pápai Perutz SC	6 / 11	21
1932–33	3	Pápai Perutz SC	5 / 8	15
1933–34	3	Perutz SC	3 / 10	24
1934–35	3	Perutz SC	1 / 12	35
1935–36	2	Pápai Perutz SC	9 / 14	24
1936–37	2	Pápai Perutz	4 / 13	26
1937–38	2	Pápai Perutz SC	3 / 14	36
1938–39	3	Pápai Perutz SC	2 / 14	37
1939–40	3	Pápai Perutz SC	2 / 14	33
1940–41	3	Pápai PSC	6 / 12	22
1941–42	3	Pápai Perutz SC	2 / 12	31
1942–43	2	Pápai PSC	7 / 12	21
1943–44	2	Pápai Perutz SC	7 / 16	31
1944–45	2	Pápai SC	8 / 14	8
1944–45	2	Pápai Perutz SC	0 / 11	
1945–46	2	Pápai Perutz SC	4 / 14	33
1946–47	3	Pápai Perutz SC	1 / 12	39
1947–48	2	Pápai Perutz SC	7 / 14	28
1948–49	2	Perutz Pápa SC	8 / 16	30
1949–50	2	Pápai Perutz SC	3 / 16	42
1950	2	Pápai Textil	3 / 16	19
1951	2	Pápai Vörös Lobogó	4 / 14	28
1952	2	Pápai Vörös Lobogó	3 / 18	41
1953	2	Pápai Vörös Lobogó	3 / 16	38
1954	2	Pápai Vörös Lobogó	14 / 16	23
1955	3	Pápai Vörös Lobogó	2 / 16	48
1956	3	Pápai Vörös Lobogó	2 / 14	42
1957	3	Pápai Textiles	1 / 10	30
1957–58	3	Pápai Textiles SE	1 / 16	40
1958–59	3	Pápai Textiles	1 / 16	42
1959–60	2	Pápai Textiles	16 / 16	18
1960–61	3	Pápai Textiles	3 / 16	37
1961–62	3	Pápai Textiles	2 / 16	43
1962–63	3	Pápai Textiles	3 / 16	41
1963 ősz	3	Pápai Textiles	8 / 18	18
1964	3	Pápai Textiles	8 / 18	36
1965	3	Pápai Textiles SE	13 / 18	30
1966	3	Pápai Textiles	17 / 18	20
1967	3	Pápai Textiles	9 / 16	30
1968	3	Pápai Textiles	5 / 16	32
1969	3	Pápai Textiles SE	5 / 16	31
1970	3	Pápai Textiles SE	9 / 16	14
1970–71	3	Pápai Textiles	6 / 16	34
1971–72	3	Pápai Textiles	6 / 16	32
1972–73	3	Pápai Textiles SE	14 / 16	22
1973–74	4	Pápai Textiles	5 / 16	40
1974–75	3	Pápai Textiles SE	12 / 20	35
1975–76	3	Pápai Textiles	17 / 19	26
1976–77	4	Pápai Textiles SE	3 / 16	41
1977–78	4	Pápai Textiles SE	2 / 16	45
1978–79	3	Pápai Textiles SE	2 / 16	44
1979–80	3	Pápai Textiles SE	7 / 16	33
1980–81	3	Pápai Textiles SE	1 / 18	54
1981–82	3	Pápai Textiles	17 / 18	20
1982–83	4	Pápai SE	5 / 16	33
1983–84	4	Pápai SE	2 / 16	43
1984–85	4	Pápai SE	3 / 16	40
1985–86	4	Pápai SE	1 / 16	53
1986–87	3	Pápai SE	12 / 18	30
1987–88	3	Pápai SE	13 / 18	28
1988–89	3	Pápai SE	7 / 16	44
1989–90	3	Pápai SE	9 / 16	37
1990–91	3	Pápa	16 / 16	18
1991–92	4	Pápai SE	8 / 16	32
1992–93	4	Pápai SE	11 / 16	29
1993–94	4	Pápai SE	7 / 16	33
1994–95	4	Pápai SE	7 / 16	50
