= 1958–59 Nemzeti Bajnokság I =

Nemzeti Bajnokság I
- Season: 1958–59

Statistics of Nemzeti Bajnokság I in the 1958–59 season.

== Overview ==
It was contested by 14 teams, and Csepel SC won the championship.

Location of teams in 1958-59 Nemzeti Bajnokság I

== League standings ==
Pos	Team	Pld	W	D	L	GF	GA	GR	Pts
1	Csepel SC	26	14	6	6	56	25	2.240	34
2	MTK Budapest FC	26	15	4	7	45	26	1.731	34
3	Budapest Honvéd FC	26	13	7	6	46	25	1.840	33
4	Vasas SC	26	12	9	5	30	22	1.364	33
5	Újpesti Dózsa	26	12	7	7	50	38	1.316	31
6	FC Tatabánya	26	12	7	7	39	31	1.258	31
7	Ferencvárosi TC	26	10	8	8	37	37	1.000	28
8	Salgótarjáni BTC	26	8	9	9	30	37	0.811	25
9	Diósgyőri VTK	26	6	10	10	28	35	0.800	22
10	Szombathelyi Haladás	26	8	8	10	26	39	0.667	22 (Note: 2 points deducted?)
11	Dorogi	26	5	11	10	33	40	0.825	21
12	BVSC Budapest	26	6	6	14	26	39	0.667	18
13	Miskolci VSC	26	4	9	13	15	46	0.326	17
14	Győri ETO FC	26	3	7	16	15	36	0.417	13

Source: rsssf.com

== Results ==
Home \ Away	BVS	CSE	DIÓ	DOR	FTC	GYŐ	HAL	HON	MTK	MVS	SAL	TAT	ÚJP	VAS
BVSC		3–2	0–0	0–2	0–0	3–1	4–0	0–1	1–1	1–2	0–1	1–0	1–1	1–2
Csepel	3–0		4–1	2–0	1–1	2–0	3–0	3–2	1–0	8–0	5–1	5–0	3–0	1–2
Diósgyőr	3–0	1–2		1–1	3–2	1–1	0–2	0–2	0–2	0–0	2–0	0–0	1–1	0–1
Dorogi Bányász	2–1	0–2	0–3		2–3	3–1	1–1	2–2	1–3	1–1	1–0	2–2	5–1	2–2
Ferencváros	1–3	1–1	3–1	0–0		0–1	2–0	4–3	0–1	3–0	3–1	1–0	3–4	0–1
Győr	1–0	0–0	4–1	1–1	0–1		1–2	0–0	0–2	0–0	0–1	0–1	0–4	0–1
Haladás	1–1	2–0	2–1	2–1	2–2	1–0		0–3	2–2	3–1	2–4	0–0	1–1	0–2
Budapest Honvéd	0–2	4–1	1–1	2–1	5–1	3–1	1–2		1–1	0–1	1–1	3–0	0–1	4–1
MTK Budapest	4–0	3–2	3–2	1–0	0–1	2–0	1–0	1–1		4–2	2–1	4–0	3–4	0–1
MVSC	0–0	0–0	1–2	2–1	0–0	1–1	3–0	0–3	0–1		0–0	1–2	0–4	0–3
Salgótarján	3–1	1–1	0–0	2–2	0–0	2–0	1–0	0–1	0–1	3–0		1–1	3–2	1–1
Tatabányai Bányász	3–2	1–1	1–2	4–1	5–0	2–1	3–0	1–2	2–1	3–0	1–1		1–1	3–1
Újpesti Dózsa	4–1	2–0	1–1	1–1	2–4	2–1	1–1	0–1	2–1	3–0	6–1	0–2		2–0
Vasas	1–0	0–3	1–1	0–0	1–1	0–0	0–0	0–0	2–1	0–0	4–1	0–1	3–0	

Source: rsssf.com
Legend: Blue = home team win; Yellow = draw; Red = away team win.

== Statistical leaders ==
=== Top goalscorers ===
Rank	Scorer	Club	Goals
1	(Hungary) Róbert Kisuczky	Csepel SC	15
1	(Hungary) Tivadar Monostori	Dorogi FC	15
1	(Hungary) Lajos Tichy	Budapest Honvéd	15
4	(Hungary) Gábor Bukovi	MTK Budapest	12
5	(Hungary) Béla Kuharszki	Újpesti Dózsa	11
5	(Hungary) László Lahos	Tatabányai Bányász	11
7	(Hungary) Tibor Bodon	Salgótarjáni BTC	10
7	(Hungary) Lajos Csordás	Vasas SC	10
7	(Hungary) Zoltán Friedmanszky	Ferencvárosi TC	10
7	(Hungary) Tibor Gondos	Csepel SC	10
7	(Hungary) János Göröcs	Újpesti Dózsa	10
7	(Hungary) László Pál	Szombathelyi Haladás	10
7	(Hungary) Károly Sándor	MTK Budapest	10

== Attendances ==
#	Club	Average
1	Ferencváros	36,308
2	Vasas	25,923
3	Újpest	19,462
4	Budapest Honvéd	19,154
5	MTK	17,769
6	Diósgyőr	13,615
7	Miskolc	11,615
8	Tatabánya	11,192
9	Csepel	10,192
10	Haladás	9,692
11	BVSC	9,346
12	Győr	8,692
13	Salgótarján	5,692
14	Dorog	5,154
