= Orosházi MTK =

Hungarian football club

- Full name: Orosházi Munkás Testedző Kör
- Founded: 1913
- Dissolved: 2003
- Ground: Vásártéri-pálya
- Website: https://omtk.hu/
Home colours

Orosházi Munkás Testedző Kör is a defunct professional football club based in Orosháza, Békés County, Hungary.

== History ==
Orosháza won the southeastern group of the 1958–59 Nemzeti Bajnokság III season as Orosházi Kinizsi. However, their second division membership did not last long since in the 1959–60 Nemzeti Bajnokság II season, Orosháza finished in the 16th position and were relegated to the third division.

== Name changes ==
- Orosházi Munkás Testedző Kör: 1913 - 1948
- 1949: merger with Orosházi Barátsággal and Orosházi MÁV SE
- Orosházi Szakszervezeti MTK: 1949 - 1951
- Orosházi Kinizsi SK: 1951 - 1956
- Orosházi Munkás Testedző Kör: 1956 - 1957
- Orosházi Kinizsi SE: 1957 - 1974
- 1974: merger with Orosházi MEDOSZ
- Orosházi Kinizsi Munkás SE: 1974 - 1975
- 1975: merger with Honvéd Dózsa SE and Orosházi Üveggyári SE
- Orosházi Munkás Testedző Kör: 1975 - 2003

== Seasons ==
The table below shows the seasons of Orosházi MTK.

Season	Tier	Club's name	Position	Pts
1920–21	2	Orosházi MTK	3 / 4	0
1921–22	3	Orosházi MTK	3 / 8	6
1922–23	3	Orosházi MTK	6 / 8	
1923–24	3	Orosházi MTK	1 / 7	
1924–25	2	Orosházi MTK	6 / 13	31
1925–26	2	Orosházi MTK	5 / 8	14
1926–27	2	Orosházi MTK	3 / 8	18
1927–28	2	Orosházi MTK	3 / 11	21
1928–29	2	Orosházi MTK	4 / 10	18
1929–30	2	Orosházi MTK	8 / 12	18
1930–31	2	Orosházi MTK	8 / 12	19
1931–32	2	Orosházi MTK	5 / 14	28
1932–33	2	Orosházi MTK	11 / 14	18
1933–34	2	Orosházi MTK	10 / 14	21
1934–35	2	Orosházi MTK	14 / 14	14
1935–36	3	Orosházi MTK	6 / 9	13
1936–37	3	Orosházi MTK	5 / 9	
1937–38	3	Orosházi MTK	2 / 10	23
1938–39	3	Orosházi MTK	12 / 12	10
1939–40	4	Orosházi MTK	1 / 9	30
1940–41	4	Orosházi MTK	6 / 12	21
1941–42	4	Orosházi MTK	12 / 14	19
1942–43	4	Orosházi MTK	5 / 14	29
1943–44	4	Orosházi MTK	10 / 12	13
1945	2	Orosházi MTK	2 / 7	18
1945–46	2	Orosházi MTK	4 / 17	46
1946–47	3	Orosházi MTK	1 / 14	40
1947–48	2	Orosházi MTK	11 / 14	20
1948–49	2	Orosházi MTK	10 / 16	28
1949–50	2	Orosházi Szakszervezeti MTK	16 / 16	19
1950	3	Orosházi SzMTK	2 / 17	25
1951	3	Orosházi Kinizsi	1 / 12	40
1952	2	Orosházi Kinizsi	9 / 18	33
1953	2	Orosházi Kinizsi	9 / 16	28
1954	2	Orosházi Kinizsi	9 / 16	32
1955	3	Orosházi Kinizsi	1 / 16	48
1956	3	Orosházi Kinizsi	2 / 16	49
1957	3	Orosházi MTK	2 / 7	14
1957–58	3	Orosházi Kinizsi	3 / 16	39
1958–59	3	Orosházi Kinizsi	1 / 16	40
1959–60	2	Orosházi Kinizsi SK	16 / 16	19
1960–61	3	Orosházi Kinizsi	7 / 16	33
1961–62	3	Orosházi Kinizsi	12 / 16	25
1962–63	3	Orosházi Kinizsi	13 / 16	27
1963	4	Orosházi Kinizsi	13 / 16	12
1964	4	Orosházi Kinizsi	10 / 16	27
1965	4	Orosházi Kinizsi	9 / 16	29
1966	4	Orosházi Kinizsi	9 / 16	27
1967	4	Orosházi Kinizsi	7 / 16	30
1968	4	Orosházi Kinizsi	9 / 16	29
1969	4	Orosházi Kinizsi	14 / 16	25
1970	5	Orosházi Kinizsi	1 / 9	26
1970–71	5	Orosházi Kinizsi	6 / 18	40
1971–72	5	Orosházi Kinizsi	1 / 18	50
1972–73	4	Orosházi Kinizsi	3 / 16	39
1973–74	4	Orosházi Kinizsi	7 / 16	34
1974–75	4	Orosházi KMSE	2 / 16	31
1975–76	3	Orosházi MTK	18 / 20	27
1976–77	4	Orosházi MTK	2 / 16	46
1977–78	4	Orosházi MTK	1 / 17	53
1978–79	3	Orosházi MTK	1 / 18	50
1979–80	2	Orosházi MTK	18 / 20	33
1980–81	3	Orosházi MTK	1 / 18	54
1981–82	3	Orosházi MTK	5 / 16	35
1982–83	3	Orosházi MTK	6 / 16	35
1983–84	3	Orosházi MTK	5 / 16	35
1984–85	3	Orosházi MTK	12 / 16	27
1985–86	3	Orosházi MTK	3 / 16	39
1986–87	3	Orosházi MTK	5 / 16	34
1987–88	3	Orosházi MTK	7 / 16	33
1988–89	3	Orosházi MTK	12 / 16	39
1989–90	3	Orosházai MTK	8 / 16	42
1990–91	3	Orosházi MTK	10 / 16	29
1991–92	3	Orosházi MTK	4 / 16	34
1992–93	3	Orosházi MTK	9 / 16	30
1993–94	3	Orosházi MTK	11 / 16	28
1994–95	3	Orosházi MTK	14 / 16	28
1995–96	4	Orosházi MTK	12 / 16	29
1996–97	4	Orosházi MTK	13 / 18	39
1997–98	5	Orosházi MTK	6 / 18	55
1998–99	5	Orosházi MTK	12 / 16	35
1999–00	5	Orosházi MTK	13 / 16	31
2000–01	5	Orosházi MTK	15 / 16	25
2002–03	5	Orosházi MTK	4 / 16	48
