= Miskolci VSC =

Hungarian football club

- Full name: Miskolci Vasutas Sport Club
- Short name: MVSC
- Founded: 1911
- Ground: MVSC Stadium
- Capacity: 8,000
- Chairman: Miklós Illyés
- Manager: Gábor Jóner
- League: Borsod-Abaúj-Zemplén megye I.
Home colours

Miskolci Vasutas Sport Club is a Hungarian football club from the town of Miskolc.

== History ==
Miskolci VSC debuted in the 1958–59 season of the Hungarian League when it finished thirteenth.

== Honours ==
- Nemzeti Bajnokság II:
  - Winners (1): 1957–58
- Nemzeti Bajnokság III:
  - Winners (1): 1993–94

== Name Changes ==
- 1911–1948: Miskolci VSC
- 1925: merger with Miskolci MÁV Altisztköri Sport Club
- 1948–1949: Miskolci Vasutas SE (MVSE)
- 1949–1954: Miskolci Lokomotív SK
- 1954–1956: Miskolci Törekvés
- 1956–1993: Miskolci Vasutas Sport Club
- 1993: merger with Stop FC-Nagycsécs
- 1993–1994: top-Miskolci VFC
- 1994–2009: Miskolci Vasutas Sport Club
- 2009–2011: Miskolci Vasutas Sport Club-MÁV Tiszavas
- 2011–present: Miskolci Vasutas Sport Club-TS Hungaria

== Seasons ==
The table below shows the seasons of Miskolci VSC.

Season	Tier	Club's name	Position	Pts
1912–13	2	Miskolci Vasutas SC	4 / 7	8
1913–14	2	Miskolci Vasutas SC	3 / 8	20
1916–17	2	Miskolci Vasutas SC	4 / 4	-
1917–18	2	Miskolci Vasutas SC	0 / 4	-
1919–20	2	Miskolci Vasutas SC	1 / 7	11
1920–21	2	Miskolci Vasutas SC	1 / 8	22
1921–22	2	Miskolci Vasutas SC	3 / 10	28
1922–23	2	Miskolci Vasutas SC	3 / 7	
1923–24	2	Miskolci Vasutas SC	2 / 8	19
1924–25	2	Miskolci Vasutas SC	2 / 8	23
1925–26	2	Miskolci Vasutas SC	1 / 10	32
1926–27	2	Miskolci Vasutas SC	3 / 8	18
1927–28	2	Miskolci Vasutas SC	2 / 8	22
1928–29	2	Miskolci Vasutas SC	3 / 10	20
1929–30	2	Miskolci VSC	3 / 10	22
1930–31	2	Miskolci Vasutas SC	4 / 10	20
1931–32	2	Miskolci Vasutas SC	6 / 10	16
1932–33	2	Miskolci VSC	6 / 11	
1933–34	2	Miskolci Vasutas SC	5 / 10	18
1934–35	2	Miskolci VSC	6 / 10	17
1935–36	2	Miskolci VSC	6 / 10	15
1936–37	2	Miskolci VSC	11 / 12	14
1937–38	3	Miskolci VSC	2 / 11	31
1938–39	4	Miskolci VSC	1 / 12	24
1939–40	3	Miskolci VSC	1 / 12	40
1940–41	2	Miskolci VSC	8 / 14	26
1941–42	2	Miskolci VSC	4 / 14	30
1942–43	2	Miskolci Vasutas SC	10 / 12	19
1943–44	2	Miskolci Vasutas SC	11 / 14	23
1944–45	2	Miskolci Vasutas SC	4 / 11	8
1944–45	2	Miskolci VSC	0 / 10	
1945	2	Miskolci Vasutas SC	3 / 8	20
1945–46	2	Miskolci VSC	6 / 12	22
1946–47	3	Miskolci VSC	1 / 13	41
1947–48	2	Miskolci Vasutas SC	7 / 13	23
1948–49	2	Miskolci Lokomotiv (Miskolci VSE)	7 / 16	32
1949–50	2	Miskolci Lokomotív	5 / 16	39
1950	2	Miskolci Lokomotív	10 / 16	14
1951	2	Miskolci Lokomotív	7 / 14	26
1952	2	Miskolci Lokomotív	6 / 18	40
1953	2	Miskolci Lokomotív	8 / 16	32
1954	2	Miskolci Lokomotív	4 / 16	36
1955	2	Miskolci Törekvés	9 / 16	28
1956	2	Miskolci VSC	8 / 16	32
1957–58	2	Miskolci VSC	1 / 19	54
1958–59	1	Miskolci VSC	13 / 14	17
1959–60	2	Miskolci VSC	9 / 16	30
1960–61	2	Miskolci VSC	6 / 16	31
1961–62	2	Miskolci VSC	7 / 16	30
1962–63	2	Miskolci VSC	3 / 16	36
1963	2	Miskolci Vasutas SC	13 / 16	12
1964	2	Miskolci VSC	11 / 16	28
1965	2	Miskolci VSC	6 / 16	33
1966	2	Miskolci Vasutas SC	14 / 16	26
1967	2	Miskolci VSC	12 / 18	32
1968	2	Miskolci VSC	14 / 18	31
1969	2	Miskolci VSC	17 / 18	22
1970	3	Miskolci VSC	6 / 16	16
1970–71	3	Miskolci VSC	6 / 16	32
1971–72	3	Miskolci VSC	1 / 16	45
1972–73	2	Miskolci VSC	18 / 18	23
1973–74	3	Miskolci VSC	4 / 16	39
1974–75	3	Miskolci VSC	5 / 20	46
1975–76	3	Miskolci VSC	7 / 20	41
1976–77	3	Miskolci VSC	6 / 20	38
1977–78	3	Miskolci VSC	2 / 20	52
1978–79	2	Miskolci VSC	14 / 20	31
1979–80	2	Miskolci VSC	7 / 20	39
1980–81	2	Miskolci VSC	11 / 20	40
1981–82	2	Miskolci VSC	15 / 16	21
1982–83	3	Miskolci VSC	14 / 16	20
1983–84	4	Miskolci VSC	1 / 14	43
1984–85	3	Miskolci VSC	16 / 16	22
1985–86	4	Miskolci VSC	3 / 16	38
1986–87	4	Miskolci VSC	2 / 16	41
1987–88	4	Miskolci VSC	4 / 16	44
1988–89	4	Miskolci VSC	4 / 16	42
1989–90	4	Miskolci VSC	2 / 16	60
1990–91	4	Miskolci VSC	1 / 16	51
1991–92	3	Miskolci VSC	11 / 16	27
1992–93	3	Miskolci VSC	12 / 16	26
1993–94	3	Stop-Miskolci VFC	1 / 16	38
1994–95	2	Miskolci VSC	16 / 16	6
1995–96	3	Miskolci VSC	12 / 16	37
1996–97	3	Miskolci VSC	13 / 16	32
1997–98	4	Miskolci VSC	2 / 16	53
1998–99	4	Miskolci VSC	2 / 16	62
1999–00	3	Miskolci VSC	16 / 16	
2000–01	5	Miskolci VSC-Siegel	13 / 20	48
2001–02	5	Miskolci VSC	9 / 18	36
2002–03	5	Miskolci VSC	5 / 18	58
2003–04	5	Miskolci VSC	1 / 18	76
2004–05	4	Miskolci VSC	13 / 15	18
2005–06	4	Miskolci VSC	8 / 18	59
2006–07	4	Miskolci VSC	13 / 18	40
2007–08	4	Miskolci VSC	8 / 18	46
2008–09	4	MVSC-Tiszavas	3 / 18	60
2009–10	4	Miskolci VSC-MÁV Tiszavas	13 / 18	43
2010–11	4	Miskolci VSC-TS Hungaria	11 / 18	43
2011–12	4	Miskolci VSC-TS Hungaria	14 / 18	34
2012–13	4	Miskolci VSC-TS Hungária	6 / 16	46
2013–14	4	Miskolci VSC-TS Hungária	11 / 16	33
2014–15	4	Miskolci VSC	11 / 16	27
2015–16	4	Miskolci VSC	12 / 16	25
2016–17	4	Miskolci VSC	16 / 16	8
2017–18	5	Miskolci Vasutas SC	5 / 15	47
2018–19	5	Miskolci Vasutas SC	2 / 15	61
2019–20	4	MVSC-Miskolc	8 / 16	28
2020–21	4	MVSC-Miskolc	9 / 16	45
2021–22	4	MVSC-Miskolc	7 / 16	47
2022–23	4	MVSC-Miskolc	10 / 16	40
2023–24	4	MVSC-Miskolc	3 / 16	51
2024–25	4	MVSC-Miskolc	2 / 16	54
2025–26	4	MVSC-Miskolc	12 / 16	30
