= Kaposvári MTE =

Hungarian football club

- Full name: Kaposvári Munkás Testedző Egyesület
- Founded: 1919
- Ground: Dózsa-pálya
Home colours

Kaposvári Munkás Testedző Egyesület is a defunct professional football club based in Kaposvár, Somogy County, Hungary.

== History ==
Kaposvári MTE won the Southwestern group of the 1958–59 Nemzeti Bajnokság III season.

== Name changes ==
- Kaposvári Munkás Testedző Egyesület: 1919 – 1949
- 1949: merger with Kaposvári Vasutas SE and Kaposvári Rákóczi AC as Kaposvári Dolgozók SK
- 1957: reestablished and replaced Kaposvári Vörös Meteor
- Kaposvári Munkás Testedző Egyesület: 1957 – 1963
- 1963: merger with Kaposvári Vasas

== Honours ==
=== League ===
- Nemzeti Bajnokság III:
  - Winners (1): 1958–59

== Seasons ==
The table below shows the seasons of Kaposvári MTE.

Season	Tier	Club's name	Position	Pts
1945–46	2	Kaposvári MTE	1 / 12	34
1946–47	2	Kaposvári MTE	3 / 14	33
1947–48	2	Kaposvári MTE	12 / 14	20
1948–49	2	Kaposvári MTE	5 / 16	34
1957	2	Kaposvári MTE	4 / 8	14
1957–58	2	Kaposvári MTE	14 / 19	30
1958–59	3	Kaposvári MTE	1 / 16	47
1959–60	2	Kaposvári MTE	15 / 16	19
1960–61	3	Kaposvári MTE	2 / 16	42
1961–62	3	Kaposvári MTE	13 / 16	26
1962–63	4	Kaposvári MTE	4 / 16	36
