= Erzsébeti Spartacus MTK LE =

Hungarian football club

- Full name: Erzsébeti Spartacus Munkás Testgyakorlók Köre Labdarúgó Egyesület
- Short name: ESMTK
- Founded: 1909; 117 years ago
- Ground: Ady Endre utca
- Capacity: 5,000
- Chairman: János Harót
- Manager: Zoltán Turi
- League: NB III; Southeast
- 2023–24: NB III; Southeast, 2nd of 16
- Website: https://esmtk.hu/
Home colours

Erzsébeti Spartacus Munkás Testgyakorlók Köre Labdarúgó Egyesület, commonly known as ESMTK, is a Hungarian football club from the town of Pesterzsébet, Hungary. It currently plays in the Nemzeti Bajnokság III – Southeast, the third tier of Hungarian football.

== History ==
Erzsébeti Spartacus Munkás Testgyakorlók Köre Labdarúgó Egyesület debuted in the 1945 season of the Hungarian League and finished seventh.

== Name changes ==
- 1909–1924: Erzsébetfalvai Munkás Testedző Kör
- 1910: merger with Munkás Testedző Egyesület (MTE) and Erzsébetfalvai Remény SC
- 1913: merger with Erzsébetfalvai FC
- 1924: Erzsébetfalva became city as Pesterzsébet
- 1924–1939: Erzsébeti Munkás Testedző Kör
- 1939: merger with Drasche Grubacs SC
- 1939–1944: Pesterzsébeti MTK
- 1944–1945: Pestszenterzsébeti Kossuth Munkás SE
- 1945: Pesterzsébeti MTK
- 1945–1949: Erzsébeti MTK
- 1949–1956: Pesterzsébeti Vasas SK
- 1952: merger with Ferencvárosi Vasas
- 1956–1958: Erzsébeti Munkás TK
- 1958–1970: Erzsébeti VTK
- 1970–1973: Erzsébeti Munkás TK
- 1973: merger with Erzsébeti Spartacus
- 1973–1991: Erzsébeti Spartacus Munkás TK
- 1991–1992: ESMTK-Bauinvest
- 1992–1995: ESMTK-Hungaplast
- 1995–?: Erzsébeti Spartacus Munkás TK
- ?-?: Erzsébeti Spartacus Munkás TK – Hungaro Casing
- 2007–present: Erzsébeti Spartacus Munkás Testgyakorlók Köre Labdarúgó Egyesület

== Honours ==
=== League ===
- Nemzeti Bajnokság II:
  - Winners (1): 1946–47
- Nemzeti Bajnokság III:
  - Winners (5): 1957–58, 1958–59, 1990–91, 2000–01, 2006–07

== Seasons ==
As of 24 October 2026.

| Season | Tier | Club's name | Position | Pts |
|---|---|---|---|---|
| 1911–12 | 4 | Erzsébetfalvi MTK | 9 / 12 | 11 |
| 1912–13 | 4 | Erzsébetfalvi MTK | 8 / 12 | 18 |
| 1913–14 | 2 | Erzsébetfalvi MTK | 9 / 9 | |
| 1914 | 3 | Erzsébetfalvi MTK | 6 / 6 | 0 |
| 1915 | 3 | Erzsébetfalvi MTK | 4 / 9 | 11 |
| 1916 | 2 | Erzsébetfalvi MTK | 8 / 8 | |
| 1916–17 | 2 | Erzsébetfalvi MTK | 5 / 12 | 11 |
| 1917–18 | 2 | Erzsébetfalvi MTK | 3 / 12 | 27 |
| 1918–19 | 2 | Erzsébetfalvi MTK | 7 / 12 | 19 |
| 1919–20 | 2 | Erzsébetfalvi MTK | 15 / 17 | 21 |
| 1920–21 | 2 | Erzsébetfalvi MTK | 11 / 14 | 18 |
| 1921–22 | 3 | Erzsébetfalvi MTK | 5 / 15 | 37 |
| 1922–23 | 2 | Erzsébetfalvi MTK | 8 / 15 | 26 |
| 1923–24 | 2 | Erzsébeti MTK | 12 / 14 | 19 |
| 1924–25 | 2 | Erzsébeti MTK | 3 / 14 | 26 |
| 1925–26 | 2 | Erzsébeti MTK | 13 / 14 | 16 |
| 1926–27 | 3 | Erzsébeti MTK | 8 / 14 | 28 |
| 1927–28 | 3 | Erzsébeti MTK | 3 / 17 | 45 |
| 1928–29 | 3 | Erzsébeti MTK | 8 / 16 | 34 |
| 1929–30 | 3 | Erzsébeti MTK | 7 / 15 | 30 |
| 1930–31 | 3 | Erzsébeti MTK | 4 / 14 | 31 |
| 1931–32 | 3 | Erzsébeti MTK | 1 / 14 | 41 |
| 1932–33 | 2 | Erzsébeti MTK | 10 / 15 | 24 |
| 1933–34 | 2 | Erzsébeti MTK | 5 / 12 | 23 |
| 1934–35 | 2 | Erzsébeti MTK | 7 / 12 | 19 |
| 1935–36 | 2 | Erzsébeti MTK | 10 / 13 | 23 |
| 1936–37 | 2 | Erzsébeti MTK | 8 / 12 | 20 |
| 1937–38 | 2 | Erzsébeti MTK | 12 / 14 | 19 |
| 1938–39 | 3 | Erzsébeti MTK | 11 / 14 | 19 |
| 1939–40 | 3 | Pesterzsébeti MTK | 5 / 14 | 33 |
| 1940–41 | 3 | Pesterzsébeti MTK | 6 / 10 | 16 |
| 1941–42 | 3 | Pesterzsébeti MTK | 8 / 12 | 16 |
| 1942–43 | 3 | Pesterzsébeti MTK | 6 / 14 | 26 |
| 1943–44 | 3 | Pesterzsébeti Kossuth Munkás SE | 3 / 16 | 42 |
| 1944–45 | 3 | Pesterzsébeti Kossuth | 0 / 12 | |
| 1944–45 | 2 | Pesterzsébeti Kossuth | 4 / 16 | 13 |
| 1945 | 1 | EMTK | 7 / 12 | 21 |
| 1945–46 | 1 | Erzsébeti MTK | 12 / 14 | 20 |
| 1946–47 | 2 | Erzsébeti MTK | 1 / 14 | 45 |
| 1947–48 | 1 | EMTK | 14 / 17 | 22 |
| 1948–49 | 2 | Erzsébeti MTK | 7 / 16 | 30 |
| 1949–50 | 2 | Pesterzsébeti Vasas | 3 / 16 | 36 |
| 1950 | 2 | Pesterzsébeti Vasas | 16 / 16 | 6 |
| 1951 | 3 | Pesterzsébeti Vasas | 2 / 12 | 36 |
| 1952 | 3 | Pesterzsébeti Vasas | 1 / 14 | 47 |
| 1953 | 2 | Pesterzsébeti Vasas | 3 / 16 | 43 |
| 1954 | 2 | Pesterzsébeti Vasas | 12 / 16 | 22 |
| 1955 | 3 | Pesterzsébeti Vasas | 2 / 16 | 52 |
| 1956 | 3 | Pesterzsébeti Vasas | 4 / 14 | 33 |
| 1957 | 3 | Erzsébeti MTK | 1 / 8 | 24 |
| 1957–58 | 3 | Erzsébeti Munkás TK | 1 / 16 | 57 |
| 1958–59 | 3 | Erzsébeti Vasas TK | 1 / 16 | 50 |
| 1959–60 | 2 | Erzsébeti Vasas TK | 10 / 16 | 27 |
| 1960–61 | 2 | Erzsébeti Vasas TK | 12 / 16 | 27 |
| 1961–62 | 2 | Erzsébeti Vasas TK | 9 / 16 | 26 |
| 1962–63 | 2 | Erzsébeti Vasas TK | 13 / 16 | 21 |
| 1963 | 3 | Erzsébeti VTK | 6 / 18 | 20 |
| 1964 | 3 | Erzsébeti Vasas TK | 16 / 18 | 27 |
| 1965 | 4 | Erzsébeti Vasas TK | 2 / 16 | 46 |
| 1966 | 4 | Erzsébeti VTK | 2 / 16 | 43 |
| 1967 | 3 | Erzsébeti Vasas TK | 5 / 16 | 32 |
| 1968 | 3 | Erzsébeti Vasas TK | 10 / 16 | 29 |
| 1969 | 3 | Erzsébeti Vasas TK | 15 / 16 | 22 |
| 1970 | 4 | Erzsébeti MTK | 13 / 16 | 11 |
| 1970–71 | 4 | Erzsébeti MTK | 8 / 16 | 29 |
| 1971–72 | 4 | Erzsébeti MTK | 3 / 16 | 36 |
| 1972–73 | 4 | Erzsébeti Spartacus MTK | 10 / 16 | 27 |
| 1973–74 | 4 | Erzsébeti Spartacus MTK | 2 / 16 | 44 |
| 1974–75 | 3 | ESMTK | 15 / 20 | 33 |
| 1975–76 | 3 | Erzsébeti SMTK | 5 / 20 | 43 |
| 1976–77 | 3 | ESMTK | 5 / 20 | 45 |
| 1977–78 | 3 | ESMTK | 12 / 20 | 37 |
| 1978–79 | 3 | ESMTK | 1 / 20 | 52 |
| 1979–80 | 3 | ESMTK | 9 / 20 | 41 |
| 1980–81 | 3 | ESMTK | 4 / 20 | 50 |
| 1981–82 | 3 | Erzsébeti SMTK | 15 / 18 | 25 |
| 1982–83 | 4 | Erzsébeti SMTK | 3 / 16 | 42 |
| 1983–84 | 4 | ESMTK | 11 / 16 | 26 |
| 1984–85 | 4 | Erzsébeti SMTK | 2 / 16 | 39 |
| 1985–86 | 3 | ESMTK | 12 / 18 | 32 |
| 1986–87 | 3 | ESMTK | 2 / 18 | 48 |
| 1987–88 | 3 | Erzsébeti SMTK | 4 / 18 | 43 |
| 1988–89 | 3 | Erzsébeti SMTK | 0 / 16 | - |
| 1988–89 | 2 | Erzsébeti SMTK | 15 / 16 | 35 |
| 1989–90 | 3 | Erzsébeti SMTK | 2 / 16 | 63 |
| 1990–91 | 3 | Erzsébeti SMTK | 1 / 16 | 45 |
| 1991–92 | 2 | Erzsébeti SMTK-Bauinvest | 10 / 16 | 30 |
| 1992–93 | 2 | ESMTK-Hungaroplast | 11 / 16 | 26 |
| 1993–94 | 2 | ESMTK-Hungaplast | 8 / 16 | 29 |
| 1994–95 | 2 | ESMTK-Hungaplast | 14 / 16 | 27 |
| 1995–96 | 3 | Erzsébeti SMTK | 6 / 16 | 47 |
| 1996–97 | 3 | ESMTK | 7 / 16 | 48 |
| 1997–98 | 4 | ESMTK | 4 / 16 | 61 |
| 1998–99 | 4 | ESMTK | 10 / 16 | 41 |
| 1999–00 | 4 | ESMTK | 3 / 16 | 52 |
| 2000 | 3 | ESMTK | 1 / 8 | 30 |
| 2000–01 | 3 | ESMTK | 1 / 12 | 39 |
| 2001–02 | 2 | ESMTK | 12 / 12 | 16 |
| 2001–02 | 2 | Erzsébeti SMTK | 12 / 12 | 12 |
| 2002–03 | 3 | ESMTK | 4 / 12 | 37 |
| 2002–03 | 3 | ESMTK | 6 / 12 | 45 |
| 2003–04 | 3 | Erzsébeti SMTK | 12 / 16 | 32 |
| 2004–05 | 3 | ESMTK | 13 / 16 | 27 |
| 2005–06 | 2 | ESMTK-Hungaro Casing | 15 / 16 | 11 |
| 2006–07 | 3 | ESMTK LE | 1 / 14 | 59 |
| 2007–08 | 2 | Erzsébeti SMTK | 13 / 16 | 29 |
| 2008–09 | 2 | Erzsébeti SMTK LE | 14 / 16 | 29 |
| 2009–10 | 3 | Erzsébeti SMTK | 3 / 14 | 40 |
| 2010–11 | 3 | Erzsébeti SMTK LE | 4 / 16 | 47 |
| 2011–12 | 3 | Erzsébeti Spartacus MTK LE | 3 / 16 | 61 |
| 2012–13 | 3 | ESMTK | 2 / 15 | 57 |
| 2013–14 | 3 | Erzsébeti SMTK | 10 / 16 | 32 |
| 2014–15 | 3 | ESMTK | 8 / 16 | 45 |
| 2015–16 | 3 | Erzsébeti Spartacus MTK LE | 11 / 17 | 39 |
| 2016–17 | 3 | ESMTK | 10 / 18 | 47 |
| 2017–18 | 3 | Erzsébeti SMTK | 2 / 16 | 50 |
| 2018–19 | 3 | Erzsébeti Spartacus MTK LE | 3 / 16 | 60 |
| 2019–20 | 3 | Erzsébeti Spartacus MTK LE | 5 / 16 | 31 |
| 2020–21 | 3 | Erzsébeti Spartacus MTK LE | 7 / 20 | 57 |
| 2021–22 | 3 | Erzsébeti Spartacus MTK LE | 13 / 20 | 47 |
| 2022–23 | 3 | Erzsébeti Spartacus MTK LE | 3 / 20 | 65 |
| 2023–24 | 3 | Erzsébeti Spartacus MTK LE | 2 / 16 | 65 |
| 2024–25 | 3 | Erzsébeti Spartacus MTK LE | 5 / 16 | 62 |
| 2025–26 | 3 | Erzsébeti Spartacus MTK LE | 2 / 16 | 66 |

== Managers ==
- Zoltán Turi (2011)
