= Jászberényi Lehel SE =

Hungarian football club

- Full name: Jászberényi Lehel Sport Egyesület
- Founded: 10 June 1906
- Dissolved: 2011
- Ground: Jászberényi Városi Stadion, Jászberény
- League: Megyei Bajnokság I
Home colours

Jászberényi Lehel Sport Egyesület is a defunct professional football club based in Jászberény, Jász–Nagykun–Szolnok County, Hungary.

== History ==
Jászberény won the 1964 Nemzeti Bajnokság III season and were promoted to the second division. Jászberény won the Tisza group of the 1983–84 Nemzeti Bajnokság III season. In the 1987–88 Nemzeti Bajnokság III, Jászberény once again finished in the first place of the Tisza group. Jászberény won the 2005–06 Nemzeti Bajnokság III season and were promoted to the second division. In the 2006–07 Nemzeti Bajnokság II season, the club finished in the 13th position. Jászberény spent another two seasons in the second tier.

== Honours ==
=== League ===
- Nemzeti Bajnokság III (level 3)
  - Winners (4): 1964, 1983–84, 1987–88, 2005–06

== Name changes ==
- 1906–?: Jászberényi Lehel Atlétikai Club
- ?–1946: Lehel Tornakör
- 1946–1947: Jászberényi Kinizsi Lehel TK
- 1947–1948: Lehel Tornakör
- 1948–1950: Lehel Munkás Tornakör
- 1950–1951: Jászberényi Szakszervezeti Sport Egylet
- 1951–1953: Jászberényi Építők SE
- 1953: dissolved, it was replaced by Jászberényi Vasas
- 1953: reestablished
- 1953–1954: Jászberényi Fémnyomó Vasas
- 1954–1955: Jászberényi Fémnyomó Lehel Vasas
- 1955: merger with Jászberényi Petőfi
- 1955–1956: Jászberényi Bástya Lehel
- 1956–1957: Jászberényi Fémnyomó Lehel Vasas
- 1957–1983: Lehel SC
- 1983: merger with Jászberényi Vasas SC
- 1983–1989: Jászberényi Lehel SE
- 1989–2008: Jászberényi SE-Vasas
- 2008–2011: Jász Sport FC
- 2011: dissolved

== Seasons ==
The table below shows the seasons of Jászberányi Lehel SC.

Season	Tier	Club's name	Position	Pts
1927–28	2	Jászberényi Lehel AC	7 / 11	11
1928–29	3	Jászberényi Lehel AC	2 / 8	21
1929–30	3	Jászberényi Lehel AC	1 / 8	24
1930–31	2	Jászberényi Lehel AC	9 / 10	13
1931–32	3	Jászberényi Lehel AC	11 / 11	30
1932–33	3	Jászberényi Lehel	3 / 9	20
1933–34	3	Jászberényi Lehel TK	0 / 7	
1934–35	3	Jászberényi Lehel AC	4 / 11	25
1935–36	3	Jászberényi Lehel TK	5 / 13	29
1936–37	3	Jászberényi Lehel	3 / 11	26
1937–38	3	Jászberényi Lehel AC	5 / 9	19
1938–39	4	Jászberényi Lehel TK	4 / 9	12
1939–40	4	Jászberényi Lehel	9 / 9	-
1940–41	4	Lehel TK	4 / 10	21
1941–42	3	Jászberényi Lehel TK	13 / 16	23
1942–43	3	Jászberényi Lehel	3 / 14	30
1943–44	3	Jászberényi Lehel	10 / 14	23
1944–45	2	Jászberényi Lehel	8 / 16	7
1944–45	3	Jászberényi Lehel	0 / 12	
1945	3	Jászberényi Lehel	3 / 4	2
1945–46	2	Jászberényi Lehel	3 / 14	30
1946–47	4	Jászberényi Kinizsi Lehel TK	1 / 14	47
1947–48	3	Jászberényi Lehel TK	4 / 16	39
1948–49	3	Jászberényi Lehel MTK	4 / 16	36
1949–50	3	Jászberényi Lehel	4 / 16	35
1950	3	Jászberényi SzSE	7 / 17	17
1951	3	Jászberényi Építők	1 / 14	41
1952	3	Jászberényi Építők	11 / 14	16
1953	5	Jászberényi Fémnyomó Vasas	1 / 1	
1954	4	Jászberényi Fémnyomó Lehel Vasas	11 / 12	11
1955	3	Jászberényi Bástya Lehel	5 / 17	37
1956	3	Jászberényi Fémnyomó Vasas	7 / 16	31
1957	3	Jászberényi Lehel SC	5 / 7	11
1957–58	4	Jászberényi Lehel	4 / 18	40
1958–59	4	Jászberényi Lehel	3 / 16	43
1959–60	4	Jászberényi Lehel SC	1 / 16	45
1960–61	3	Jászberényi Lehel SC	9 / 16	30
1961–62	3	Jászberényi Lehel	6 / 16	35
1962–63	3	Jászberényi Lehel	3 / 16	34
1963	3	Jászberényi Lehel SC	7 / 18	18
1964	3	Jászberényi Lehel	1 / 18	49
1965	2	Lehel SC Jászberény	15 / 16	18
1966	3	Jászberényi Lehel SC	17 / 18	26
1967	3	Jászberényi Lehel SC	4 / 16	34
1968	3	Jászberényi Lehel SC	10 / 16	27
1969	3	Jászberényi Lehel SC	2 / 16	40
1970	3	Jászberényi Lehel SC	11 / 16	14
1970–71	3	Lehel SC	4 / 16	36
1971–72	3	Lehel SC	15 / 16	23
1972–73	4	Lehel SC	2 / 16	42
1973–74	4	Lehel SC	4 / 16	32
1974–75	3	Lehel SC	7 / 20	44
1975–76	3	Lehel SC	7 / 20	41
1976–77	3	Lehel SC	4 / 20	46
1977–78	3	Lehel SC	12 / 20	39
1978–79	2	Lehel SC	11 / 20	36
1979–80	2	Lehel SC	14 / 20	37
1980–81	2	Lehel SC	15 / 20	34
1981–82	2	Lehel SC	12 / 16	26
1982–83	3	Lehel SC	2 / 16	44
1983–84	3	Jászberényi Lehel SE	1 / 16	47
1984–85	3	Jászberényi Lehel SC	4 / 16	39
1985–86	3	Jászberényi Lehel SC	7 / 16	33
1986–87	3	Jászberényi Lehel SE	3 / 16	38
1987–88	3	Jászberényi Lehel SE	1 / 16	44
1988–89	2	Jászberényi Lehel SC	16 / 16	24
1989–90	3	Jászberény	4 / 16	48
1990–91	3	Jászberény	10 / 16	28
1991–92	3	Jászberény	2 / 16	45
1992–93	3	Jászberényi SE	3 / 16	39
1993–94	3	Jászberényi SE	2 / 16	46
1994–95	3	Jászberényi SE	4 / 16	56
1995–96	3	Jászberényi SE-Vasas	3 / 16	53
1996–97	3	Jászberényi SE	5 / 16	48
1997–98	4	Jászberényi SE-Vasas	2 / 16	72
1998–99	4	Jászberényi SE-Vasas	1 / 16	68
1999–00	3	Jászberény	5 / 16	45
2000	2	Jászberényi SE-Vasas	5 / 7	12
2000–01	3	Jászberény	9 / 12	25
2001–02	3	Jászberényi SE	8 / 13	31
2002–03	4	Jászberényi SE Vasas	3 / 16	64
2003–04	4	Jászberény	14 / 16	33
2004–05	4	Jászberényi SE-Vasas	4 / 14	43
2005–06	3	Jászberényi SE	1 / 16	66
2006–07	2	Jászberényi SE	13 / 16	29
2007–08	2	Jászberényi SE - Vasas	9 / 16	36
2008–09	2	Jászberényi SE	15 / 16	28
2009–10	3	Jászberényi SE	8 / 14	37
2010–11	3	Jász Sport FC	15 / 15	18
