= Kőbányai Lombik TK =

Hungarian football club

- Full name: Kőbányai Lombik TK
- Founded: 1927
Home colours

Kőbányai Lombik Torna Klub is a defunct professional football club based in Kőbánya, Budapest, Hungary.

== History ==
Kőbányai Lombik TK won the norther group of the 1959–60 Nemzeti Bajnokság III season and gained promotion to the second division. The club spent three consecutive years in the second division. Finally, the club were releagted in 1963, when they finished in the 14th position of the 1962–63 Nemzeti Bajnokság II season.

On 12 April 1972, Kőbányai Lombik played a friendly match against Ferencvárosi TC. The match ended with a 9-2 victory for Ferencváros.

== Name changes ==
- Kőbányai Testgyakorlók Köre: 1927 – 1949
- Kőbányai Lombik Torna Klub: 1949 – 1950
- Központi Lombik TK: 1950 – 1951
- 1951: merger with Tipográfia Állami Nyomda
- Budapesti Szikra SK: 1951 – 1956
- 1956: the two clubs separated
- Kőbányai Lombik TK: 1956 – 1985
- Fabulon SC: 1985 – present

== Honours ==
=== League ===
- Nemzeti Bajnokság III:
  - Winners (1): 1959–60

== Seasons ==
The table below shows the seasons of Kőbányai Lombik TK.

Season	Tier	Club's name	Position	Pts
1927–28	5	Kőbányai TK	3 / 14	40
1928–29	5	Kőbányai TK	1 / 12	39
1929–30	4	Kőbányai TK	3 / 12	29
1930–31	4	Kőbányai TK	11 / 15	25
1931–32	4	Kőbányai TK	15 / 16	22
1932–33	4	Kőbányai TK	8 / 16	30
1933–34	4	Kőbányai TK	3 / 13	32
1934–35	4	Kőbányai TK	6 / 11	19
1935–36	4	Kőbányai TK	4 / 13	29
1936–37	4	Kőbányai TK	2 / 15	41
1937–38	3	Kőbányai TK	7 / 14	25
1938–39	4	Kőbányai TK	3 / 14	37
1939–40	3	Kőbányai TK	4 / 14	35
1940–41	3	Kőbányai TK	3 / 12	31
1941–42	3	Kőbányai TK	3 / 16	39
1942–43	2	Kőbányai TK	8 / 14	22
1943–44	3	Kőbányai TK	14 / 15	19
1944–45	2	Kőbányai TK	15 / 16	0
1944–45	3	Kőbányai TK	0 / 13	
1945	2	Kőbányai TK	3 / 12	28
1945–46	2	Kőbányai TK	9 / 14	24
1946–47	3	Kőbányai TK	2 / 14	40
1947–48	3	Kőbányai TK	2 / 16	45
1948–49	3	Kőbányai Lombik TK	8 / 18	38
1949–50	2	Központi Lombik TK	6 / 16	31
1950	2	Központi Lombik TK	12 / 16	10
1951	2	Budapesti Szikra	3 / 14	29
1952	2	Budapesti Szikra	11 / 18	30
1953	2	Budapesti Szikra	7 / 16	30
1954	2	Budapesti Szikra	3 / 16	37
1955	2	Budapesti Szikra	11 / 16	27
1956	2	Kőbányai Lombik TK	12 / 16	26
1957–58	2	Kőbányai Lombik TK	15 / 19	31
1958–59	3	Kőbányai Lombik	11 / 16	27
1959–60	3	Kőbányai Lombik TK	1 / 17	44
1960–61	2	Kőbányai Lombik TK	13 / 16	26
1961–62	2	Kőbányai Lombik TK	13 / 16	23
1962–63	2	Kőbányai Lombik	14 / 16	20
1963	3	Kőbányai Lombik TK	13 / 18	13
1964	3	Kőbányai Lombik TK	18 / 18	20
1965	4	Kőbányai Lombik	16 / 16	16
1966	5	Kőbányai Lombik	2 / 14	33
1967	4	Kőbányai Lombik TK	4 / 16	38
1968	4	Kőbányai Lombik TK	15 / 16	19
1969	5	Kőbányai Lombik TK	9 / 18	35
1970	5	Kőbányai Lombik TK	3 / 16	20
1970–71	5	Kőbányai Lombik TK	6 / 16	34
1971–72	5	Kőbányai Lombik TK	5 / 16	34
1972–73	5	Kőbányai Lombik	8 / 16	25
1973–74	5	Kőbányai Lombik TK	1 / 16	45
1974–75	4	Kőbányai Lombik	14 / 18	30
1976–77	5	Kőbányai Lombik TK	9 / 16	25
1977–78	5	Kőbányai Lombik	3 / 16	39
1978–79	4	Kőbányai Lombik	10 / 16	22
1979–80	4	Kőbányai Lombik	4 / 16	34
1980–81	4	Kőbányai Lombik TK	6 / 16	37
1981–82	5	Kőbányai Lombik TK	8 / 16	32
1982–83	5	Kőbányai Lombik TK	10 / 16	28
1983–84	5	Kőbányai Lombik	7 / 16	29
1984–85	5	Kőbányai Lombik TK	6 / 16	29
1985–86	5	Fabulon SC	2 / 16	43
1986–87	5	Fabulon SC	6 / 16	34
1987–88	5	Fabulon SC	0 / 14	
1988–89	5	Fabulon SC	3 / 15	37
1989–90	5	Fabulon	3 / 16	43
1990–91	5	Fabulon SC	1 / 15	46
1991–92	4	Fabulon	14 / 16	24
1992–93	4	Fabulon SC	9 / 16	24
