= Pécsi BTC =

Hungarian football club

- Full name: Pécsi Bőrgyári Torna Club
- Founded: 1932
- Ground: Bőrgyár pálya
Home colours	Away colours

Pécsi Bőrgyári Torna Club was a football club from the town of Pécs, Hungary.

== History ==
On 29 September 1930, Pécsi Bőrgyári Torna Club was established. Most players of the club worked at the leather factory in Pécs, Pécsi Bőrgyár.

In the 1949–50 Nemzeti Bajnokság II season, the club, as Pécsi Bőripari Dolgozók SE, finished in the second place reaching its best result in its football history.

== Name changes ==
- Pécsi BTC: 1932 - 1950
- Pécsi Bőripari Dolgozók SE: 1950 - 1951
- Pécsi Vörös Lobogó: 1952 - 1956
- Pécsi Bőrgyári Torna Club: 1956 - 1992

== Honours ==
=== League ===
- Nemzeti Bajnokság II:
  - Runners-up (2): 1949–50
  - Third place (1): 1945, 1948–49

== Seasons ==
The table below shows the seasons of Pécsi BTC.

Season	Tier	Club's name	Position	Pts
1933–34	2	Pécsi Bőrgyári TC	8 / 12	21
1934–35	3	Pécsi Bőrgyári TC	1 / 13	43
1935–36	2	Pécsi BTC	10 / 12	16
1936–37	2	Pécsi BTC	5 / 12	25
1937–38	2	Pécsi BTC	7 / 12	22
1938–39	3	Pécsi BTC	3 / 12	28
1939–40	3	Pécsi BTC	3 / 12	31
1940–41	4	Pécsi BTC	2 / 14	37
1941–42	4	Pécsi BTC	5 / 12	21
1942–43	3	Pécsi BTC	3 / 14	32
1943–44	3	Pécsi BTC	7 / 13	25
1944–45	2	Pécsi BTC	7 / 14	6
1944–45	3	Pécsi Bőrgyári TC	0 / 12	
1945	2	Pécsi BTC	3 / 9	11
1945–46	2	Pécsi BTC	3 / 12	35
1946–47	3	Pécsi Bőrgyári TC	1 / 12	40
1947–48	2	Pécsi Bőrgyári TC	9 / 14	25
1948–49	2	Pécsi BTC	3 / 16	39
1949–50	2	Pécsi BTC	2 / 16	43
1950	2	Pécsi Bőripari Dolgozók SE	7 / 16	15
1951	2	Pécsi Vörös Lobogó	6 / 14	26
1952	2	Pécsi Vörös Lobogó	11 / 18	31
1953	2	Pécsi Vörös Lobogó	14 / 16	23
1954	2	Pécsi Vörös Lobogó	16 / 16	11
1955	3	Pécsi Vörös Lobogó	6 / 16	33
1956	3	Pécsi Vörös Lobogó	8 / 16	29
1957	3	Pécsi Bőrgyári TC	2 / 8	20
1957–58	3	Pécsi Bőrgyári TC	2 / 16	38
1958–59	3	Pécsi BTC	7 / 16	34
1959–60	3	Pécsi BTC	1 / 17	40
1960–61	2	Pécsi BTC	14 / 16	24
1961–62	3	Pécsi BTC	2 / 16	42
1962–63	3	Pécsi BTC	1 / 16	47
1963	3	Pécsi BTC	2 / 18	23
1964	3	Pécsi BTC	6 / 18	38
1965	3	Pécsi BTC	18 / 18	20
1966	4	Pécsi BTC	6 / 16	35
1967	4	Pécsi BTC	2 / 16	44
1968	4	Pécsi BTC	2 / 16	39
1969	4	Pécsi BTC	1 / 16	47
1970	3	Pécsi BTC	16 / 16	7
1970–71	3	Pécsi BTC	14 / 16	24
1971–72	4	Pécsi BTC	4 / 16	34
1972–73	4	Pécsi BTC	3 / 17	38
1973–74	4	Pécsi BTC	5 / 16	35
1974–75	4	Pécsi BTC	1 / 16	44
1975–76	3	Pécsi BTC	18 / 20	24
1976–77	4	Pécsi BTC	6 / 16	35
1977–78	4	Pécsi BTC	12 / 18	33
1978–79	3	Pécsi BTC	7 / 18	34
1979–80	3	Pécsi BTC	9 / 18	34
1980–81	3	Pécsi BTC	3 / 18	44
1981–82	3	Pécsi BTC	10 / 16	29
1982–83	3	Pécsi BTC	12 / 16	25
1983–84	3	Pécsi BTC	15 / 16	18
1984–85	4	Pécsi BTC	2 / 18	50
1985–86	4	Pécsi BTC	3 / 19	48
1986–87	4	Pécsi BTC	1 / 18	50
1987–88	3	Pécsi BTC	15 / 16	21
1988–89	4	Pécsi Bőrgyári TC	9 / 16	28
1989–90	4	Pécsi BTC	5 / 16	46
1990–91	4	Pécsi BTC	11 / 16	23
1991–92	4	Pécsi BTC	17 / 18	20
