= 1990–91 Nemzeti Bajnokság III =

Nemzeti Bajnokság III
- Season: 1991–92
- Champions: Miskei TSZ SK (Alföld); Ajkai Bányász SK (Bakony); Paksi SE (Dráva); Erzsébeti Spartacus MTK LE (Duna); Bagi SE (Mátra); Hajdúnánási Bocskai SE (Tisza)
- Promoted: Miskei TSZ SK (Alföld); Ajkai Bányász SK (Bakony); No Team (Dráva); Erzsébeti Spartacus MTK LE (Duna); Bagi SE (Mátra); Hajdúnánási Bocskai SE (Tisza)

The 1990–91 Nemzeti Bajnokság III season was the 9th edition of the Nemzeti Bajnokság III.

== League tables ==
=== Alföld group ===
Pos	Team	Pld	W	D	L	GF	GA	GD	Pts	Promotion or relegation
1	Miskei TSZ SK	30	19	11	0	71	19	+52	49	Promotion to Nemzeti Bajnokság II
2	Kiskőrösi Petőfi LC	30	18	7	5	52	26	+26	43	
3	Szegedi Dózsa SC	30	12	13	5	40	29	+11	37	
4	Ceglédi Honvéd SE	30	15	5	10	47	33	+14	35	
5	Csongrádi VSE	30	12	11	7	44	31	+13	35	
6	Gyulai SE	30	13	9	8	39	32	+7	35	
7	Dömsödi SE	30	12	10	8	47	36	+11	34	
8	Mezőtúri Honvéd SE	30	9	12	9	32	31	+1	30	
9	Dabasi Fehérakác SE	30	11	8	11	42	43	−1	30	
10	Orosházi MTK	30	8	13	9	37	40	−3	29	
11	Kiskundorozsmai ESK	30	10	8	12	33	39	−6	28	
12	Nagyszénási TSZ SK	30	8	10	12	29	34	−5	26	
13	Kiskunfélegyházi Honvéd SE	30	6	8	16	30	68	−38	20	Relegation to Megyei Bajnokság I
14	Mezőkovácsháza MTE	30	6	7	17	32	48	−16	19	
15	Határőr Dózsa SC	30	3	9	18	28	59	−31	15	Relegation to Megyei Bajnokság I
16	Mezőhegyesi SE	30	5	5	20	21	56	−35	15	

=== Bakony group ===
Pos	Team	Pld	W	D	L	GF	GA	GD	Pts	Promotion or relegation
1	Ajkai Bányász SK	30	19	5	6	55	27	+28	43	Promotion to Nemzeti Bajnokság II
2	Keszthelyi Haladás SC	30	17	8	5	68	22	+46	42	
3	Betka-MÁV DAC	30	16	6	8	61	31	+30	38	
4	Motim TE	30	15	6	9	50	38	+12	36	
5	Répcelaki Bányász	30	13	10	7	43	33	+10	36	
6	Győri Dózsa SE	30	10	13	7	31	24	+7	33	
7	Fűzfői AK	30	13	6	11	39	35	+4	32	
8	Herend	30	11	10	9	36	34	+2	32	
9	Tapolca	30	13	5	12	48	41	+7	31	
10	Körmendi FC	30	11	8	11	37	40	−3	30	
11	Zala Volán	30	9	5	16	38	45	−7	23	
12	Hegyeshalom	30	7	9	14	35	54	−19	23	
13	Celldömölk	30	7	7	16	29	48	−19	21	
14	Petőháza	30	7	7	16	25	48	−23	21	
15	Kemenesalja	30	7	7	16	34	65	−31	21	
16	Pápai SE	30	6	6	18	21	65	−44	18	Relegation to Megyei Bajnokság I

=== Dráva group ===
Pos	Team	Pld	W	D	L	GF	GA	GD	Pts	Relegation
1	Paksi SE	28	19	4	5	65	23	+42	42	
2	Kaposvári Rákóczi	28	17	5	6	42	23	+19	39	
3	Pécsi VSK	28	15	8	5	51	16	+35	38	
4	Kaposvári Honvéd SE	28	11	10	7	36	33	+3	32	
5	Marcali	28	12	6	10	42	36	+6	30	
6	Siklós	28	11	8	9	32	29	+3	30	
7	Bólyi Medosz	28	12	5	11	47	35	+12	29	
8	Barcs	28	8	13	7	29	34	−5	29	
9	MÁV Nagykanizsai TE	28	9	8	11	35	39	−4	26	
10	Kisdorog	28	10	6	12	42	47	−5	26	
11	Kaposvári Építők	28	8	8	12	25	38	−13	24	
12	Boglárlelle	28	9	5	14	27	34	−7	23	
13	Somberek	28	8	7	13	35	45	−10	23	Relegation to Megyei Bajnokság I
14	Csurgó	28	5	7	16	23	53	−30	17	Relegation to Megyei Bajnokság I
15	Mázaszászvár	28	5	2	21	22	68	−46	12	Relegation to Megyei Bajnokság I
16	Dombóvári Vasas (Note: withdrew?)	0	0	0	0	0	0	0	0	Relegation to Megyei Bajnokság I

=== Duna group ===
Pos	Team	Pld	W	D	L	GF	GA	GD	Pts	Promotion or relegation
1	Erzsébeti SMTK	30	19	7	4	77	29	+48	45	Promotion to Nemzeti Bajnokság II
2	Pénzügyőr SE	30	16	10	4	42	23	+19	42	
3	Esztergomi Vasas SC	30	16	9	5	45	31	+14	41	
4	Péti Munkás TE	30	15	8	7	49	36	+13	38	
5	Dunai Kőolaj SK	30	15	8	7	54	42	+12	38	
6	Rákosmenti TK	30	15	6	9	50	38	+12	36	
7	Gödöllő LC	30	12	9	9	46	40	+6	33	
8	Hargita FC	30	10	8	12	42	39	+3	28	
9	Honvéd Hargita SE	30	11	5	14	44	43	+1	27	
10	Várpalotai Bányász SK	30	7	13	10	42	49	−7	27	
11	Diadém Dunakeszi Vasutas SE	30	12	3	15	39	52	−13	27	
12	Érdi VSE	30	6	14	10	30	37	−7	26	
13	Honvéd Szondi SE	30	10	5	15	33	42	−9	25	
14	Peremartoni SC	30	8	4	18	55	83	−28	20	Relegation to Megyei Bajnokság I
15	MALÉV SC	30	5	8	17	48	71	−23	18	Relegation to Megyei Bajnokság I
16	Tatai Honvéd AC	30	2	5	23	25	66	−41	9	Relegation to Megyei Bajnokság I

=== Mátra group ===
Pos	Team	Pld	W	D	L	GF	GA	GD	Pts	Promotion or relegation
1	Bagi SE	30	17	11	2	60	24	+36	45	Promotion to Nemzeti Bajnokság II
2	Salgótarjáni Kohász SE	30	18	7	5	48	26	+22	43	
3	Gyöngyösi AK	30	13	12	5	38	20	+18	38	
4	Volán Rákóczi	30	15	4	11	59	45	+14	34	
5	Salgótarjáni BTC	30	12	10	8	36	27	+9	34	
6	Törökszentmiklósi FC	30	14	5	11	57	35	+22	33	
7	Szolnoki Cukorgyár SE	30	11	11	8	41	33	+8	33	
8	Balassagyarmati HVSE	30	12	6	12	46	46	0	30	
9	Bélapátfalva	30	12	6	12	52	56	−4	30	
10	Jászberény	30	13	6	11	54	40	+14	28 (Note: 4 points deducted)	
11	Dány	30	8	9	13	37	44	−7	25	
12	Apci Vasas	30	7	10	13	30	43	−13	24	
13	Nagyréde (Note: merger with Honvéd Gáspár SE)	30	8	8	14	29	48	−19	24	
14	Borsodnádasd	30	8	5	17	27	50	−23	21	
15	Pásztói SE	30	7	7	16	31	62	−31	19 (Note: 2 points deducted)	Relegation to Megyei Bajnokság I
16	Salgó Öblös Faipari SC (Note: in the spring of 1991 it was replaced by Romhány)	30	6	1	23	27	73	−46	11 (Note: 2 points deducted)	Relegation to Megyei Bajnokság I

=== Tisza group ===
Pos	Team	Pld	W	D	L	GF	GA	GD	Pts	Promotion
1	Hajdúnánási Bocskai SE	30	18	6	6	53	30	+23	42	Promotion to Nemzeti Bajnokság II
2	Mátészalkai MTK	30	16	8	6	58	34	+24	40	
3	Ózdi Kohász SE	30	14	12	4	42	18	+24	40	
4	Tiszavasvári Lombik SE	30	15	9	6	48	28	+20	39	
5	Rakamazi Spartacus SE	30	14	8	8	40	26	+14	36	
6	Kisvárdai SE	30	12	11	7	36	27	+9	35	
7	Balmazújvárosi SC (Note: Until 1991, as Balmazújvárosi Lenin TSz SE)	30	14	7	9	45	44	+1	35	
8	Debreceni Kinizsi SE	30	13	8	9	41	33	+8	34	
9	Borsodi Építők Volán SC	30	13	6	11	35	25	+10	32	
10	Edelényi Bányász SE	30	9	9	12	24	29	−5	27	
11	Olefin SC	30	10	6	14	38	35	+3	26	
12	Szerencs-Hegyalja SE (Note: Merger with Mádi Bányás in the winter break)	30	9	7	14	40	42	−2	25	
13	Leveleki Dózsa TSz SE	30	6	9	15	31	53	−22	21	
14	Sajóbábonyi Vegyész SE	30	5	11	14	26	48	−22	21	
15	Hajdúböszörményi Bocskai SE	30	4	6	20	26	62	−36	14	
16	Püspökladányi MÁV Egyetértés SE	30	4	5	21	20	69	−49	13	

== See also ==
- 1990–91 Magyar Kupa
- 1990–91 Nemzeti Bajnokság I
- 1990–91 Nemzeti Bajnokság II
