= 1992–93 Nemzeti Bajnokság II =

Nemzeti Bajnokság II
- Season: 1992–93
- Champions: Szombathelyi Haladás (West); Debreceni VSC (East)
- Promoted: Szombathelyi Haladás (West); FC Sopron (West); Debreceni VSC (East)
- Relegated: Sabaria SE (West); Tatabánya (West); Kaposvár (West); Ajka (West); Eger (East); Salgótarján (East); Bagi FC (East)

The 1992–93 Nemzeti Bajnokság II was the 95th season of the Nemzeti Bajnokság II, the second tier of the Hungarian football league.

== League table ==
=== Western group ===
| Pos | Team | Pld | W | D | L | GF | GA | GD | Pts | Promotion or relegation |
|---|---|---|---|---|---|---|---|---|---|---|
| 1 | Haladás VSE | 30 | 17 | 8 | 5 | 43 | 16 | +27 | 42 | Promotion to Nemzeti Bajnokság I |
| 2 | EMDSZ-Soproni LC | 30 | 14 | 9 | 7 | 46 | 31 | +15 | 37 | Promotion to Nemzeti Bajnokság I |
| 3 | BKV Előre SC | 30 | 13 | 10 | 7 | 44 | 26 | +18 | 36 | |
| 4 | Dorogi Bányász SC | 30 | 11 | 13 | 6 | 42 | 25 | +17 | 36 (Note: 1 bonus point?) | |
| 5 | Dunaferr SE | 30 | 14 | 6 | 10 | 34 | 27 | +7 | 34 | |
| 6 | Zalaegerszegi TE | 30 | 13 | 8 | 9 | 33 | 26 | +7 | 34 | |
| 7 | Szekszárdi Polgári SE | 30 | 12 | 10 | 8 | 30 | 26 | +4 | 34 | |
| 8 | Sabaria-Tipo SE | 30 | 12 | 9 | 9 | 37 | 32 | +5 | 33 | Relegation to Nemzeti Bajnokság III |
| 9 | Nagykanizsai Olajbányász SE | 30 | 12 | 8 | 10 | 37 | 26 | +11 | 32 | |
| 10 | Mohácsi FC | 30 | 11 | 6 | 13 | 31 | 45 | −14 | 28 | |
| 11 | ESMTK-Hungaroplast | 40 | 9 | 18 | 13 | 29 | 48 | −19 | 26 (Note: 10 points deducted?) | |
| 12 | Paksi Atomerőmű SE | 30 | 8 | 9 | 13 | 36 | 45 | −9 | 25 | |
| 13 | Pénzügyőr SE | 30 | 7 | 10 | 13 | 34 | 41 | −7 | 24 | |
| 14 | Tatabányai SC | 30 | 6 | 12 | 12 | 37 | 48 | −11 | 24 | Relegation to Nemzeti Bajnokság III |
| 15 | Kaposvári Rákóczi FC | 30 | 8 | 6 | 16 | 31 | 51 | −20 | 22 | Relegation to Nemzeti Bajnokság III |
| 16 | Ajka Hungalu SE | 30 | 3 | 8 | 19 | 28 | 59 | −31 | 14 | Relegation to Nemzeti Bajnokság III |

=== Eastern group ===
| Pos | Team | Pld | W | D | L | GF | GA | GD | Pts | Promotion or relegation |
|---|---|---|---|---|---|---|---|---|---|---|
| 1 | Debreceni Vasutas SC | 30 | 16 | 9 | 5 | 45 | 20 | +25 | 41 | Promotion to Nemzeti Bajnokság I |
| 2 | FC Hatvan | 30 | 12 | 11 | 7 | 31 | 29 | +2 | 35 | |
| 3 | Tiszavasvári Alkaloida SE | 30 | 12 | 9 | 9 | 42 | 32 | +10 | 33 | |
| 4 | Kiskőrös FC | 30 | 14 | 5 | 11 | 43 | 34 | +9 | 33 | |
| 5 | Kabai Egyetértés SE | 30 | 12 | 9 | 9 | 37 | 30 | +7 | 33 | |
| 6 | Kazincbarcikai SC | 30 | 12 | 8 | 10 | 40 | 28 | +12 | 32 | |
| 7 | Bajai FC | 30 | 14 | 4 | 12 | 37 | 38 | −1 | 32 | |
| 8 | III. Kerületi TVE | 30 | 11 | 9 | 10 | 44 | 37 | +7 | 31 | |
| 9 | Gödöllői LC | 30 | 12 | 7 | 11 | 37 | 33 | +4 | 31 | |
| 10 | Szarvasi Vasas SE | 30 | 10 | 10 | 10 | 35 | 39 | −4 | 30 | |
| 11 | Hajdúnánási FC | 30 | 9 | 11 | 10 | 26 | 27 | −1 | 29 | |
| 12 | Budafoki MTE | 30 | 10 | 9 | 11 | 28 | 35 | −7 | 29 | |
| 13 | Szeged SC | 30 | 10 | 8 | 12 | 39 | 46 | −7 | 28 | |
| 14 | Eger SE | 30 | 10 | 6 | 14 | 43 | 41 | +2 | 26 | Relegation to Nemzeti Bajnokság III |
| 15 | Salgótarjáni BTC | 30 | 7 | 6 | 17 | 35 | 58 | −23 | 20 | Relegation to Nemzeti Bajnokság III |
| 16 | Bagi FC | 30 | 4 | 9 | 17 | 23 | 58 | −35 | 17 | Relegation to Nemzeti Bajnokság III |

== Promotion play-off ==
Play-off 1
| Diósgyőr | 1–0 | EMDSZ-Soproni LC |
| EMDSZ-Soproni LC | 5–0 | Diósgyőr |
Play-off 2
| FC Hatvan (NB II) | 1–2 | Újpesti TE (NB I) |
| Újpesti TE (NB I) | 0–0 | FC Hatvan (NB II) |

== See also ==
- 1992–93 Magyar Kupa
- 1992–93 Nemzeti Bajnokság I
