= 1991–92 Nemzeti Bajnokság III =

Nemzeti Bajnokság III
- Season: 1991–92
- Champions: Kiskőrösi Petőfi LC (Alföld); Ajkai Hungalu (Bakony); Kaposvári Rákóczi (Dráva); Pénzügyőr SE (Duna); Gödöllői SK (Mátra); Salgótarjáni BTC (Mátra); Tiszavasvári Lombik SE (Tisza)

The 1991–92 Nemzeti Bajnokság III season was the 10th edition of the Nemzeti Bajnokság III.

== League tables ==
=== Alföld group ===
Pos	Team	Pld	W	D	L	GF	GA	GD	Pts	Promotion or relegation
1	Kiskőrösi Petőfi LC	30	21	6	3	63	21	+42	48	Promotion to Nemzeti Bajnokság II
2	Kecskeméti TE	30	21	5	4	61	21	+40	47	
3	Hódmezővásárhelyi Metripond SE	30	15	8	7	48	31	+17	38	
4	Orosházi MTK	30	12	10	8	45	24	+21	34	
5	Gyulai SE	30	11	10	9	34	38	−4	32	
6	Makói FC	30	13	6	11	38	49	−11	32	
7	Nagyszénási SE	30	8	14	8	32	31	+1	30	
8	Dabasi SE	30	10	9	11	46	42	+4	29	
9	Ceglédi Honvéd SE	30	9	10	11	38	48	−10	28	
10	Kiskundorozsmai ESK	30	5	17	8	33	36	−3	27	
11	Gyomaendrődi SE	30	10	7	13	34	42	−8	27	
12	Szegedi Dózsa SC	30	8	11	11	31	40	−9	27	
13	Szigetszentmiklósi SE	30	8	10	12	41	46	−5	26	
14	Mezőtúri Spartacus AFC	30	7	6	17	17	38	−21	20	Relegation to Megyei Bajnokság I
15	Fajszi SE	30	6	6	18	26	53	−27	18	
16	Csongrádi VSE	30	4	9	17	22	49	−27	17	

=== Bakony group ===
Pos	Team	Pld	W	D	L	GF	GA	GD	Pts	Promotion or relegation
1	Ajkai Hungalu	30	21	7	2	59	12	+47	49	Promotion to Nemzeti Bajnokság II
2	Keszthelyi Haladás SC	30	19	6	5	63	29	+34	44	
3	Győri Dózsa SE	30	15	8	7	65	26	+39	38	
4	Répcelaki Bányász	30	17	4	9	64	38	+26	38	
5	Betka-MÁV DAC	30	12	13	5	53	25	+28	37	
6	Tapolca	30	15	7	8	42	24	+18	37	
7	Balatonfüred	30	11	14	5	42	30	+12	36	
8	Motim TE	30	14	7	9	66	36	+30	35	
9	Hévíz	30	11	4	15	50	49	+1	26	
10	Herend	30	9	8	13	34	41	−7	26	
11	Hegyeshalom	30	7	10	13	36	49	−13	24	
12	Sárvár	30	9	6	15	34	49	−15	24	
13	Körmend	30	9	6	15	35	63	−28	24	
14	Kapuvár	30	8	4	18	28	59	−31	20	
15	Celldömölk	30	5	5	20	21	73	−52	15	
16	Zala Volán	30	2	3	25	23	112	−89	7	Relegation to Megyei Bajnokság I

=== Dráva group ===
Pos	Team	Pld	W	D	L	GF	GA	GD	Pts	Promotion or relegation
1	Kaposvári Rákóczi FC	30	19	7	4	55	16	+39	45	Promotion to Nemzeti Bajnokság II
2	Pécsi VSK	30	16	9	5	51	28	+23	41	
3	Bolyi Medosz SE	30	17	6	7	44	21	+23	40	
4	Komlói Bányász SK	30	14	8	8	42	23	+19	36	
5	Paksi SE	30	14	6	10	36	32	+4	34	
6	Nagyatádi VSE	30	13	6	11	49	38	+11	32	
7	Kisdorogi Medosz SE	30	11	10	9	41	38	+3	32	
8	Bonyhádi MSC	30	11	9	10	47	31	+16	31	
9	Barcsi SC	30	9	12	9	30	32	−2	30	
10	Kaposvári Építők SC	30	9	10	11	41	43	−2	28	
11	Marcali VSE	30	10	7	13	36	36	0	27	
12	Kaposvári Honvéd SE	30	8	9	13	26	33	−7	25	
13	Balatonlelle SE	30	9	7	14	35	55	−20	25	
14	Pécsi EAC	30	10	5	15	35	56	−21	25	Relegation to Megyei Bajnokság I
15	MÁV Nagykanizsai TE	30	8	3	19	33	65	−32	19	Relegation to Megyei Bajnokság I
16	Siklósi Tenkes SE	30	3	4	23	31	85	−54	10	Relegation to Megyei Bajnokság I

=== Duna group ===
Pos	Team	Pld	W	D	L	GF	GA	GD	Pts	Promotion or relegation
1	Pénzügyőr SE	28	19	5	4	35	10	+25	43	Promotion to Nemzeti Bajnokság II
2	Érdi VSE	28	18	6	4	47	25	+22	42	
3	Honvéd Hargita SE	28	15	6	7	57	37	+20	36	Relegation to Megyei Bajnokság I
4	Százhalombatta FC	28	13	9	6	48	26	+22	35	
5	Esztergomi Vasas	28	14	6	8	51	34	+17	34	
6	Rákosmenti TK	28	12	7	9	45	40	+5	31	
7	Lajoskomáromi SE	28	9	11	8	39	35	+4	29	
8	Dreher Sörgyár SE	28	9	9	10	36	44	−8	27	
9	Monori SE	28	7	9	12	33	43	−10	23	
10	Ludens Atletic FC	28	7	9	12	33	43	−10	23	
11	Honvéd Szondi-Waltham SE	28	6	10	12	22	33	−11	22	Relegation to Megyei Bajnokság I
12	Dömsöd SE	28	7	7	14	28	45	−17	21	
13	Sárisápi Bányász SE	28	6	8	14	25	47	−22	20	Relegation to Megyei Bajnokság I
14	Nike-Fűzfői AK	28	4	9	15	27	40	−13	17	Relegation to Megyei Bajnokság I
15	Várpalotai Bányász SK	28	5	7	16	24	48	−24	17	Relegation to Megyei Bajnokság I
16	Péti Munkás TE (Note: withdrew?)	0	0	0	0	0	0	0	0	Relegation to Megyei Bajnokság I

=== Mátra group ===
Pos	Team	Pld	W	D	L	GF	GA	GD	Pts	Promotion or relegation
1	Gödöllői SK	30	20	6	4	62	21	+41	46	Promotion to Nemzeti Bajnokság II
2	Jászberény	30	19	7	4	82	18	+64	45	
3	Gyöngyösi AK	30	18	5	7	51	24	+27	41	
4	Salgótarjáni BTC	30	16	7	7	50	32	+18	39	Promotion to Nemzeti Bajnokság II
5	Dunakeszi	30	14	7	9	51	37	+14	35	
6	Bélapátfalva	30	14	5	11	48	44	+4	33	
7	Szolnoki Cukor	30	13	4	13	41	36	+5	30	
8	Salgótarjáni Kohász	30	12	6	12	38	44	−6	30	
9	Sajóbábony	30	10	8	12	30	26	+4	28	
10	Heréd	30	10	8	12	31	37	−6	28	
11	Rákóczifalva	30	9	6	15	36	47	−11	24	
12	Törökszentmiklós	30	7	9	14	31	50	−19	23	
13	Balassagyarmati HVSE	30	8	7	15	31	68	−37	23	
14	Nagyréde	30	7	8	15	30	47	−17	22	
15	SVT SC	30	6	9	15	22	49	−27	21	
16	Tarnalelesz	30	4	4	22	26	80	−54	12	Relegation to Megyei Bajnokság I

=== Tisza group ===
Pos	Team	Pld	W	D	L	GF	GA	GD	Pts	Promotion or relegation
1	Tiszavasvári Lombik SE	30	19	8	3	67	26	+41	46	Promotion to Nemzeti Bajnokság II
2	Hajdúszoboszlói VSE	30	17	9	4	52	27	+25	43	
3	Ózdi Kohász SE	30	16	10	4	65	29	+36	42	
4	Rakamazi Spartacus SE	30	14	9	7	45	33	+12	37	
5	Mátészalkai MTK	30	13	8	9	43	28	+15	34	
6	Borsodi Építők Volán SC	30	12	10	8	46	32	+14	34	
7	Edelényi VSE (Note: Until 1992 its name was Edelényi Bányász)	30	12	9	9	28	28	0	33	
8	Karcagi SE	30	10	12	8	44	51	−7	32	
9	Balmazújvárosi SC	30	11	9	10	46	33	+13	31	
10	Kisvárdai SE	30	13	5	12	44	40	+4	31	
11	Miskolci VSC	30	7	13	10	27	39	−12	27	
12	Szerencs-Hegyalja SE	30	6	11	13	32	43	−11	23	
13	Olefin SC	30	8	7	15	29	43	−14	23	
14	Levelek	30	6	6	18	29	74	−45	18	
15	Debreceni Kinizsi SE	30	3	8	19	23	56	−33	14	Relegation to Megyei Bajnokság I
16	Nagyhalász	30	2	8	20	22	60	−38	12	

== See also ==
- 1991–92 Magyar Kupa
- 1991–92 Nemzeti Bajnokság I
- 1991–92 Nemzeti Bajnokság II
