= 1990–91 Nemzeti Bajnokság I =

Nemzeti Bajnokság I
- Season: 1990–91
- Champions: Budapest Honvéd
- Relegated: Szeged SC; Debrecen; Békéscsaba; Volán
- European Cup: Budapest Honvéd
- Cup Winners' Cup: Ferencváros
- UEFA Cup: Pécs; Váci Izzó
- Matches: 240
- Goals: 545 (2.27 per match)
- Top goalscorer: József Gregor (19)

Statistics of Nemzeti Bajnokság I in the 1990–91 season.

== Overview ==
It was contested by 16 teams, and Budapest Honvéd FC won the championship. Honvéd's title came as a surprise as they were forced to play the relegation tiebreaker, beating Kazincbarcika 3–2 on aggregate in the previous season. The arrival of newly appointed coach Mezey György, who had been head coach of the Hungarian national team, proved to be a good effect on the club's performance. The method of awarding the winner of a match 3 points was abolished; this time 2 points were given. Szeged and Bp. Volán won promotion while Debrecen maintained their first division status winning 2–1 on aggregate over Dunaújváros in the relegation tiebreaker.

Honvéd took the first position for the first time in the season after round 2, but were placed 5th the following matchday, as Tatabánya were first place. Ferencváros and Vác both spent a week atop the table, before Honvéd regained their first place after Week 7. The red and blacks would stay top of the league all the way until the end of the season, as the club went on a 14-game unbeaten streak. Honvéd confirmed their championship after Gameday 28, where despite losing 2–1 to 3rd placed Pécs, Ferencváros, who had been applying pressure on their southern rivals throughout the season, also dropped points against Volán FC.

== League standings ==
Pos	Team	Pld	W	D	L	GF	GA	GD	Pts	Qualification or relegation
1	Budapest Honvéd (C)	30	19	7	4	50	20	+30	45	Qualification for European Cup first round
2	Ferencváros	30	15	10	5	47	22	+25	40	Qualification for Cup Winners' Cup first round
3	Pécs	30	15	7	8	32	20	+12	37	Qualification for UEFA Cup First round
4	Váci Izzó	30	14	8	8	35	29	+6	36	Qualification for UEFA Cup First round
5	Veszprém	30	11	12	7	34	25	+9	34	
6	Tatabányai Bányász	30	12	9	9	37	32	+5	33	
7	Siófoki Bányász	30	10	11	9	25	28	−3	31	
8	Videoton	30	11	8	11	39	41	−2	30	
9	Újpest	30	13	4	13	36	39	−3	30	
10	MTK-VM	30	10	6	14	38	39	−1	26	
11	Győr	30	8	10	12	35	41	−6	26	
12	Vasas	30	8	8	14	32	43	−11	24	
13	Szeged SC (R)	30	9	6	15	26	37	−11	24	Qualification for relegation play-offs
14	Debrecen (R)	30	7	8	15	27	40	−13	22	Qualification for relegation play-offs
15	Békéscsaba (R)	30	7	7	16	24	39	−15	21	Relegation to Nemzeti Bajnokság II
16	Volán (R)	30	8	5	17	28	50	−22	21	Relegation to Nemzeti Bajnokság II

Source: rsssf.com
(C) Champions; (R) Relegated

== Results ==
Home \ Away	BÉK	DEB	FTC	GYŐ	HON	MTK	PÉC	SIÓ	SZE	TAT	UTE	VAS	VÁC	VES	VID	VOL
Békéscsaba		3–0	1–1	1–1	0–2	0–0	0–1	2–1	1–2	1–0	3–1	0–1	0–1	2–0	2–4	0–1
Debrecen	2–1		0–2	2–0	0–1	1–7	0–0	1–1	3–1	0–0	0–0	1–0	1–2	2–2	3–0	2–0
Ferencváros	4–0	3–2		1–2	1–1	4–0	1–0	1–0	3–1	1–2	1–0	1–0	0–0	2–2	4–0	1–0
Győr	0–0	1–1	0–1		1–1	3–1	2–1	0–0	2–1	1–1	0–1	4–0	1–1	0–1	3–0	1–1
Budapesti Honvéd	3–0	1–0	2–1	1–2		2–1	1–0	0–1	1–0	1–0	1–0	1–1	3–0	1–1	2–0	4–0
MTK-VM	1–1	1–0	1–0	2–1	2–4		1–2	2–0	2–0	0–1	2–1	1–2	1–2	0–1	1–0	3–0
Pécs	0–2	1–0	1–1	3–0	2–1	2–2		2–1	1–0	1–0	1–0	1–0	0–0	0–0	2–0	1–0
Siófoki Bányász	0–0	2–1	0–0	2–1	1–0	0–0	1–0		0–0	1–1	3–0	1–2	1–0	0–0	3–2	0–0
Szeged SC	2–1	0–0	0–1	4–1	1–3	0–0	0–2	2–0		4–2	0–4	2–1	1–0	0–2	1–0	1–0
Tatabányai Bányász	2–1	3–1	0–0	4–0	0–0	1–1	2–1	0–2	1–0		3–1	2–4	2–0	3–3	0–0	2–1
Újpest	1–0	1–0	0–5	2–2	1–2	3–2	2–1	1–1	1–0	0–1		1–0	0–2	1–0	2–0	3–1
Vasas	1–0	0–0	2–3	2–1	1–1	0–2	1–1	3–0	1–1	1–2	2–5		1–2	0–1	1–1	2–4
Váci Izzó	0–0	2–1	1–1	2–1	2–3	3–2	1–4	0–0	1–0	1–0	0–2	2–0		0–0	2–2	3–1
Veszprém	3–0	0–1	2–1	0–1	0–0	1–0	1–0	4–0	0–0	1–1	2–2	0–1	1–0		2–2	4–3
Videoton	3–0	3–2	1–1	1–1	1–3	3–0	0–0	3–1	1–0	2–1	3–0	1–1	0–2	1–0		4–1
Volán	1–2	2–0	1–1	3–2	0–4	1–0	0–1	0–2	2–2	2–0	1–0	1–1	0–3	1–0	0–1	

Source: rsssf.com
Legend: Blue = home team win; Yellow = draw; Red = away team win.

== Relegation play-offs ==
Team 1	Agg.	Team 2	1st leg	2nd leg
Szegedi Bástya (I)	2–3	Diósgyőr (II)	1–2	1–1
Debrecen (I)	2–3	Zalaegerszeg (II)	1–1	1–2 (a.e.t.)

== Statistical leaders ==
=== Top goalscorers ===
Rank	Scorer	Club	Goals
1	(Hungary) József Gregor	Budapest Honvéd	19
2	(Hungary) Pál Fischer	Ferencvárosi TC	12
3	(Hungary) Dénes Váczi	Tatabányai Bányász	11
4	(Czechoslovakia) Attila Belansky	Pécsi MSC	10
5	(Hungary) Antal Füle	Váci Izzó	9
5	(Hungary) Péter Galaschek	Vasas SC	9
5	(Hungary) István Sallói	Videoton SC	9
5	(Hungary) Tibor Simon	Tatabányai Bányász	9

== Attendances ==
Average home league attendance top 3:

#	Club	Average
1	Ferencváros	13,467
2	Budapest Honvéd	6,967
3	Pécs	6,933
