= Ózd-Sajóvölgye FSE =

Hungarian football club

- Full name: Ózd-Sajóvölgye Focisuli Sportegyesület
- Founded: 2011
- Website: https://www.ozdsvf.hu/
Home colours

Ózd-Sajóvölgye Focisuli Sportegyesület is an association football club from Ózd, Borsod–Abaúj–Zemplén County, Hungary.

== History ==
In the 2024–25 Megyei Bajnokság I, Ózd-Sajövölgye won the Borsod group and entered the promotion play-offs. On 8 June 2025, Ózd beat Hajdúnánás FK 3–0 away. On 15 June, Ózd beat 2–0 Hajdúnánés and were promoted to the third division on 5–0 aggregate.

On 24 June 2026, Ákos Szala was appointed as the coach of the club.

== Honours ==
- Megyei Bajnokság I:
  - Winners (1): 2023–24, 2024–25

== Seasons ==
The table below shows the seasons of Ózd-Sajóvölgye FSE.

Season	Tier	Club's name	Position	Pts
2020–21	5	Ózd-Sajóvölgye	3 / 15	55
2021–22	5	Ózd-SVF SE	1 / 16	79
2022–23	4	Ózd-SVF SE	2 / 16	56
2023–24	4	Ózd-SVF SE	1 / 16	84
2024–25	4	Ózd-SVF SE	1 / 16	65
2025–26	3	Ózd-SVF SE	14 / 16	29

== Managers ==
- Ákos Elek (7 october 2025)
- Ákos Szalai (2026-present)
