= Gödöllői SK =

Hungarian football club

- Full name: Gödöllői Sport Klub
- Founded: 1991
- League: 2026–27 Nemzeti Bajnokság III
- Website: https://godolloisk.hu/
Home colours

Gödöllői Sport Klub is a professional football club based in Gödöllő, Pest County, Hungary, that competes in the Nemzeti Bajnokság III, the third tier of Hungarian football.

== History ==
Today’s Gödöllői SK was founded after the fall of communism as the legal successor to the Gödöllő Power Plant team. In 1992, they won the third division and competed in the second division for four years. Among others, they played against the first teams of MTK and Diósgyőr.

In 1996, a 15th-place finish meant relegation. Based on their on-field performance in the 1996–1997 season, they could have remained in the third division, but due to reorganization, they were relegated one division lower. In the 1999–2000 season, they won the silver medal. In 2000, they still finished third in the regular season, but from that point on, a steady decline and a period of stagnation began; the team fell into a massive slump—or, in other words, hit rock bottom. Perhaps these evocative words do not fully convey the extent of the decline. The fact is that for a very long time, Gödöllő failed to qualify for the main draw of the Magyar Kupa. In 2003, they finished in last place in the fourth division with a disastrous goal difference; we don’t know why they were kept in the league. Gödöllő also very rarely made it into the top 10 during this period. In 2005, due to league reorganization, they spent a year in the third division, from which they were immediately relegated. In 2009, they secured their place in the fourth division a few rounds before the end by earning 3 points on a bye against Kerepes, which had previously withdrawn from the competition. They lost 5–0 to Pilis, 7–2 to Üllő, and, a year later, 6–2 to Nagykőrös. According to former players, the team’s decline was exacerbated by the fact that the owners changed almost every year, a trend reflected in the constant name changes. There was a painter-entrepreneur, a Romani entrepreneur, and for a short time, they even used the name “Naszály Milk.” One bright spot was that in the spring of 2010, they somehow made it into the main draw of the Hungarian Cup, where they defeated Gázművek 5–4 on penalty kicks after a 1–1 draw in regulation and extra time. In the second round, despite leading 2-0 against Kispest II, a certain Richárd Vernes—a very young player at the time—came off the bench as a substitute and almost single-handedly brought the score to 2-2; then, in extra time, Kispest II won 4-2, again led by him. In 2011, they reached the PMK final, where they lost 2-0 to Nagykőrös. This result also earned them a spot in the main draw of the Magyar Kupa. They beat Vasas II 1-0 on an own goal, then lost 2-0 to Kispest II. During those years, the core of the team consisted of: Attila Sipeki (goalkeeper), Milán Hevesi, Gábor Székely, Norbert F. Kerecsényi, Tamás Csernyák, Dávid Smeló, Péter Kővári, Gábor Kiglics, Roland Nagy, Felipe Miranda, and Miklós Kovács.

In the fall of 2012, the team was still struggling. They lost 4–0 to Újlengyel and 6–0 to Törökbálint. The two poor goalies were quickly dropped from the first team. In the spring, however, they came out playing better than they had in a long time. Their biggest win was an 8–2 victory over Alsónémedi, but they also defeated Újlengyel and Verőce 6–2 each. They advanced to the top four teams in the PMK, where they lost 2–0 to Dunaharaszti. In the main draw, they beat Pannonhalma 3-0, then lost to Szeged 2-0. It’s worth noting that Gödöllő has a strong youth team that has been competing in the second division for a very long time. This is where Roland Varga, a member of Győr’s 2013 championship team, began his career, as did Gergő Lovrencsics, who went on to play in the Polish top division and was also a member of the national team.

== Name changes ==
- Gödöllői Labdarúgó Club: 1991 – ?
- Gödöllői FC: ? – 1995
- Gödöllő-Naszálytej LC: 1995 – ?
- Gödöllő-Verzál LC: ? – ?
- Pelikán Gödöllői LC: ? – ?
- Pelikán FC-Gödöllő: ? – ?
- Gödöllői Sport Klub: ? –

== Honours ==
=== League ===
- Nemzeti Bajnokság III:
  - Winners (1): 1991–92

== Seasons ==
The table below shows the seasons of Gödöllői SK.

Season	Tier	Club's name	Position	Pts
1990–91	3	Gödöllő LC	7 / 16	33
1991–92	3	Gödöllő	1 / 16	46
1992–93	2	Gödöllői LC	9 / 16	31
1993–94	2	Gödöllői FC	11 / 16	26
1994–95	2	Gödöllő-Verzál LC	12 / 16	35
1995–96	2	Gödöllő-Naszálytej LC	15 / 16	26
1996–97	3	Gödöllői LC	13 / 16	31
1997–98	4	Gödöllői LC	8 / 16	43
1998–99	4	Gödöllői LC	10 / 16	37
1999–2000	4	Gödöllő	2 / 16	53
2000	3	Gödöllői LC	3 / 8	26
2000–01	4	Gödöllői LC	12 / 12	17
2001–02	4	Pelikán Gödöllői LC	13 / 14	9
2002–03	4	Gödöllő PFC	16 / 16	14
2003–04	4	Gödöllő	12 / 16	34
2004–05	4	Gödöllői SC	12 / 14	24
2005–06	3	Pelikán FC-Gödöllő	16 / 16	16
2006–07	4	Gödöllő	13 / 16	22
2007–08	4	Gödöllői SK	11 / 16	39
2008–09	4	Gödöllői SK	9 / 16	38
2009–10	4	Gödöllői SK	12 / 16	32
2010–11	4	Gödöllői SK	11 / 16	38
2011–12	4	Gödöllői SK	10 / 16	36
2012–13	4	Gödöllői SK	4 / 16	53
2013–14	4	Gödöllői SK	8 / 16	41
2014–15	4	Gödöllői SK	11 / 16	36
2015–16	4	Gödöllői SK	5 / 16	48
2016–17	4	Gödöllői SK	2 / 16	63
2017–18	4	Gödöllői SK	13 / 16	29
2018–19	4	Gödöllői SK	2 / 16	51
2019–20	4	Gödöllői SK	10 / 16	19
2020–21	4	Gödöllői SK	5 / 16	45
2021–22	4	Gödöllői SK	1 / 16	74
2022–23	4	Gödöllői SK	3 / 16	59
2023–24	4	Gödöllői SK	2 / 16	76
2024–25	4	Gödöllői SK	1 / 16	79
2025–26	3	Gödöllői SK	7 / 16	40

== Managers ==
- Tamás Hevesi: 2020–2021
