= 1981–82 Nemzeti Bajnokság III =

Nemzeti Bajnokság III
- Season: 1981–82
- Champions: NIKE Fűzfői AK (Bakony); Siófoki Bányász SK (Dráva); Érdi VSE (Duna); Bajai SK (Kőrös); Nagybátonyi Bányász SC (Mátra); Balmazújvárosi Lenin TSZ SE (Tisza)
- Promoted: Siófoki Bányász SK (Dráva); Bajai SK (Kőrös); Nagybátonyi Bányász SC (Mátra)

The 1981–82 Nemzeti Bajnokság III season was the 1st edition of the Nemzeti Bajnokság III.

== League tables ==
=== Bakony group ===
Pos	Teams	Pld	W	D	L	GF	GA	GD	Pts	Promotion or relegation
1	NIKE Fűzfői AK	34	20	9	5	82	33	49	49	Advance to play-offs
2	MOTIM TE	34	19	10	5	52	28	24	48	
3	Győri Dózsa SE	34	16	12	6	64	39	25	44	
4	Körmendi Dózsa MTE	34	17	7	10	63	42	21	41	
5	Zirc-Dudari Bányász	34	15	10	9	44	37	7	40	
6	Répcelaki Bányász	34	12	14	8	49	38	11	38	
7	Honvéd Katona József SE	34	12	13	9	44	33	11	37	
8	Péti MTE	34	13	11	10	42	38	4	37	
9	Győrszentiváni TSz SK	34	14	8	12	58	43	15	36	
10	Hévízi SK	34	12	12	10	48	49	-1	36	
11	Ajkai Bányász	34	15	6	13	47	49	-2	36	Relegation to Megyei Bajnokság I
12	LATEX Kőszegi SE	34	12	8	14	40	43	-3	32	Relegation to Megyei Bajnokság I
13	Szombathelyi Spartacus Styl	34	9	12	13	39	53	-14	30	Relegation to Megyei Bajnokság I
14	Kapuvári SE	34	8	9	17	38	61	-23	25	Relegation to Megyei Bajnokság I
15	Csornai SE	34	10	4	20	37	64	-27	24	Relegation to Megyei Bajnokság I
16	Zalaegerszegi Dózsa	34	7	9	18	24	56	-32	23	Relegation to Megyei Bajnokság I
17	Pápai Textiles SE	34	7	6	21	45	73	-28	20	Relegation to Megyei Bajnokság I
18	Honvéd Bottyán SE 1	34	6	4	24	30	67	-37	14	Relegation to Megyei Bajnokság I

=== Dráva group ===
Pos	Teams	Pld	W	D	L	GF	GA	GD	Pts	Promotion or relegation
1	Siófoki Bányász	30	23	6	1	82	19	63	52	Advance to play-offs
2	Sellyei SE	30	12	10	8	58	44	14	34	
3	Siklós	30	10	13	7	34	25	9	33	
4	Kisdorogi MEDOSZ	30	11	9	10	47	41	6	31	
5	Paksi SE	30	9	13	8	47	42	5	31	
6	Mázaszászvári Bányász	30	13	5	12	47	43	4	31	
7	Bólyi MEDOSZ	30	11	8	11	37	36	1	30	
8	Bonyhádi MSC	30	9	12	9	34	39	-5	30	
9	Honvéd Táncsics SE	30	10	9	11	32	36	-4	29	
10	Pécsi BTC	30	8	13	9	34	40	-6	29	
11	Honvéd Latinca SE	30	10	8	12	38	40	-2	28	Relegation to Megyei Bajnokság I
12	Bátaszéki SzVSE	30	9	10	11	27	39	-12	28	Relegation to Megyei Bajnokság I
13	Tamási MEDOSZ SE	30	10	5	15	35	38	-3	25	Relegation to Megyei Bajnokság I
14	Honvéd Kiss János SE	30	8	9	13	38	48	-10	25	Relegation to Megyei Bajnokság I
15	Barcsi SC	30	9	7	14	37	57	-20	25	Relegation to Megyei Bajnokság I
16	Pécsi Zsolnay SE	30	7	5	18	19	59	-40	19	Relegation to Megyei Bajnokság I

=== Duna group ===
Pos	Teams	Pld	W	D	L	GF	GA	GD	Pts	Promotion or relegation
1	Érdi VSE	34	21	6	7	63	26	37	48	Advance to play-offs
2	Honvéd Rákóczi SE	34	18	9	7	63	41	22	45	
3	ÉGSZÖV-MEDOSZ SE	34	18	9	7	48	30	18	45	
4	III. Kerületi TTVE	34	18	6	10	61	37	24	42	
5	Dömsöd Dózsa TSZ SE	34	14	13	7	59	48	11	41	
6	Oroszlányi Bányász SK	34	13	15	6	39	28	11	41	
7	Esztergomi MIM Vasas SE	34	14	12	8	57	38	19	40	
8	Vasas Ikarus SK	34	15	10	9	50	37	13	40	
9	Mezőfalvai SE	34	13	11	10	50	50	0	37	
10	Ráckevei Aranykalász TSz SE	34	13	10	11	66	51	15	36	
11	Soroksári VOSE	34	9	16	9	44	40	4	34	Relegation to Megyei Bajnokság I
12	Honvéd Toldi Miklós SE	34	12	8	14	53	54	-1	32	Relegation to Megyei Bajnokság I
13	Mányi TK	34	11	8	15	49	56	-7	30	Relegation to Megyei Bajnokság I
14	Tatai AC	34	8	11	15	34	59	-25	27	Relegation to Megyei Bajnokság I
15	Erzsébeti SMTK	34	7	11	16	49	57	-8	25	Relegation to Megyei Bajnokság I
16	Medicor SC	34	6	11	17	36	65	-29	23	Relegation to Megyei Bajnokság I
17	Dunaújvárosi Építők SK	34	3	8	23	25	75	-50	14	Relegation to Megyei Bajnokság I
18	Honvéd Szondi SE	34	2	8	24	22	76	-54	12	Relegation to Megyei Bajnokság I

=== Kőrös group ===
Pos	Teams	Pld	W	D	L	GF	GA	GD	Pts	Promotion or relegation
1	Bajai SK	30	25	2	3	83	16	67	52	Advance to play-offs
2	Lajosmizse	30	16	11	3	52	28	24	43	
3	Délép SC	30	19	4	7	65	32	33	42	
4	Honvéd Kun Béla SE	30	15	9	6	55	26	29	39	
5	Orosházi MTK	30	13	9	8	53	36	17	35	
6	Hódmezővásárhelyi Porcelán	30	10	11	9	53	53	0	31	
7	Mindszent	30	12	5	13	36	43	-7	29	
8	Füzesgyarmat	30	11	7	12	55	67	-12	29	
9	Kecskeméti TE	30	9	10	11	39	36	3	28	
10	Nagyszénási TSz SK	30	10	7	13	35	38	-3	27	
11	Békéscsabai Agyagipar SK	30	8	10	12	38	50	-12	26	Relegation to Megyei Bajnokság I
12	Jánoshalma	30	9	8	13	32	46	-14	26	Relegation to Megyei Bajnokság I
13	Szentesi Vízmű 1	30	9	4	17	38	62	-24	21	Relegation to Megyei Bajnokság I
14	Szeghalmi SC	30	7	7	16	38	67	-29	21	Relegation to Megyei Bajnokság I
15	Tiszakécske	30	6	7	17	26	44	-18	19	Relegation to Megyei Bajnokság I
16	Szegedi KSZV SE	30	3	5	22	32	86	-54	11	Relegation to Megyei Bajnokság I

=== Mátra group ===
Pos	Teams	Pld	W	D	L	GF	GA	GD	Pts	Promotion or relegation
1	Nagybátonyi Bányász SC	30	18	7	5	69	25	44	43	Advance to play-offs
2	Hatvani KVSC	30	17	9	4	54	21	33	43	
3	Borsod Volán	30	14	8	8	49	34	15	36	
4	Bélapátfalvai Építők	30	15	6	9	44	35	9	36	
5	Edelényi Bányász	30	16	3	11	43	32	11	35	
6	Olefin SC	30	15	4	11	59	30	29	34	
7	Borsodi Bányász SE	30	15	4	11	49	36	13	34	
8	Recski Ércbányász	30	14	4	12	48	36	12	32	
9	Salgótarjáni Síküveggyár	30	11	10	9	48	39	9	32	
10	Borsodnádasd	30	12	8	10	46	39	7	32	
11	Romhányi Építők	30	11	8	11	39	46	-7	30	Relegation to Megyei Bajnokság I
12	Petőfibányai Bányász	30	10	9	11	37	48	-11	29	Relegation to Megyei Bajnokság I
13	Sajóbábonyi Vegyész	30	10	8	12	32	36	-4	28	Relegation to Megyei Bajnokság I
14	Siroki Vasas	30	7	8	15	33	50	-17	22	Relegation to Megyei Bajnokság I
15	Szécsény	30	3	5	22	20	77	-57	11	Relegation to Megyei Bajnokság I
16	Salgótarjáni Ötvözet	30	0	3	27	18	104	-86	3	Relegation to Megyei Bajnokság I

=== Tisza group ===
Pos	Teams	Pld	W	D	L	GF	GA	GD	Pts	Promotion or relegation
1	Balmazújvárosi Lenin TSZ SE	30	15	9	6	69	41	28	39	Advance to play-offs
2	Hajdúböszörményi Bocskai SE	30	16	7	7	50	26	24	39	
3	Hajdúszoboszlói Bocskai SE	30	13	12	5	47	28	19	38	
4	Tiszavasvári Lombik SE	30	14	10	6	42	24	18	38	
5	Rákóczifalvai TSZ SE	30	15	7	8	48	27	21	37	
6	Rakamazi Spartacus SE	30	13	9	8	48	38	10	35	
7	Csengeri TSz SE	30	13	8	9	38	36	2	34	
8	Kisvárdai SE	30	13	6	11	46	38	8	32	
9	Jászkiséri TSz SE	30	11	10	9	40	34	6	32	
10	Hajdú Vasas SE	30	10	12	8	34	36	-2	32	
11	Nagyhalászi Textiles SE	30	12	6	12	50	49	1	30	Relegation to Megyei Bajnokság I
12	Debreceni Volán SC	30	10	5	15	35	43	-8	25	Relegation to Megyei Bajnokság I
13	Törökszentmiklósi SE	30	6	11	13	33	44	-11	23	Relegation to Megyei Bajnokság I
14	Karcagi SE	30	7	6	17	42	71	-29	20	Relegation to Megyei Bajnokság I
15	Mándoki KSE	30	4	11	15	21	41	-20	19	Relegation to Megyei Bajnokság I
16	Kunszentmártoni TE	30	2	3	25	22	89	-67	7	Relegation to Megyei Bajnokság I

== Promotion play-offs ==
Playoff 1
Home	Result	Away
NIKE Fűzfői AK	3–4 (1–0)	Nagybátonyi Bányász SC
Nagybátonyi Bányász SC	3–1 (1–1)	NIKE Fűzfői AK

Playoff 2
Home	Result	Away
Balmazújvárosi TSZ SE	1–1 (0–0)	Siófoki Bányász SK
Siófoki Bányász SK	2–1 (1–0)	Balmazújvárosi TSZ SE

Playoff 3
Home	Result	Away
Bajai SK	4–0 (3–0)	Érdi VSE
Érdi VSE	0–3 (0–0)	Bajai SK

== See also ==
- 1981–82 Magyar Kupa
- 1981–82 Nemzeti Bajnokság I
- 1981–82 Nemzeti Bajnokság II
