= Tiszavasvári SE =

Hungarian football club

- Full name: Tiszavasvári Sportegyesület
- Founded: 1948
- Website: https://www.tiszavasvarisk.hu/
Home colours

Tiszavasvári Sportegyesület is a professional football club based in Tiszavasvári, Szabolcs–Szatmár–Bereg County, Hungary, that competes in the Nemzeti Bajnokság III, the third tier of Hungarian football.

== History ==
Tiszavasvári won the 1991–92 Nemzeti Bajnokság III season and gained promotion to the second division.

== Name changes ==
- Bűdszentmihályi ATE: 1948 – 1949
- Bűdszentmihályi Lombik: 1949 – 1951
- Büdszentmihályi Szikra Alkaloida SK: 1951 – 1952
- 1952: the name of the town was changed to Tiszavasvári
- Tiszavasvári Szikra Alkaloida: 1952 – ?
- Tiszavasvári Traktor: ? – 1957
- Tiszavasvári Lombik SE: 1957 – 1992
- Tiszavasvári Alkaloida SE: 1992 – 1998
- INC Alkaloida SE Tiszavasvári: 1998 – 1999
- Tiszavasvári SE: 1999 – present

== Honours ==
=== League ===
- Nemzeti Bajnokság III:
  - Winners (1): 1991–92

== Seasons ==
The highest league that Tiszavasvári SE have ever played was the second tier.

Season	Tier	Club's name	Position	Pts
2025–26	4	Tiszavasvári SE	15 / 15	17
2024–25	5	Tiszavasvári SE	2 / 13	52
2023–24	5	Tiszavasvári SE	5 / 14	48
2022–23	5	Tiszavasvári SE	4 / 14	38
2021–22	5	Tiszavasvári SE	3 / 14	52
2020–21	5	Tiszavasvári SE	5 / 15	49
2019–20	5	Tiszavasvári SE	6 / 16	27
2018–19	4	Tiszavasvári SE	16 / 16	15
2017–18	4	Tiszavasvári SE	7 / 16	47
2016–17	4	Tiszavasvári SE	3 / 16	45
2015–16	4	Tiszavasvári SE	9 / 16	34
2014–15	4	Tiszavasvári SE	4 / 16	58
2013–14	5	Tiszavasvári SE	1 / 16	82
2012–13	4	Tiszavasvári SE	10 / 16	43
2011–12	4	Tiszavasvári SE	2 / 16	58
2010–11	4	Tiszavasvári SE	11 / 18	45
2009–10	4	Tiszavasvári SE	7 / 18	48
2008–09	4	Tiszavasvári SE	6 / 16	52
2007–08	4	Tiszavasvári SE	6 / 16	42
2006–07	4	Tiszavasvári SE	3 / 16	60
2005–06	4	Tiszavasvári	5 / 16	44
2004–05	5	Tiszavasvári	4 / 16	53
2003–04	5	Tiszavasvári	10 / 16	43
2002–03	5	Tiszavasvári SE	11 / 16	33
2001–02	6	Tiszavasvári SE	1 / 16	58
2000–01	6	Tiszavasvári SE	3 / 16	60
1999–2000	7	Tiszavasvári	1 / 16	77
1998–99	2	ICN Alkaloida SE Tiszavasvári	12 / 20	50
1997–98	2	Tiszavasvári Alkaloida SE	12 / 20	48
1996–97	2	Tiszavasvári Alkaloida SE	7 / 16	44
1995–96	2	Tiszavasvári Alkaloida SE	6 / 16	50
1994–95	2	Tiszavasvári Alkaloida SE	9 / 16	43
1993–94	2	Tiszavasvári Alkaloida SE	7 / 16	33
1992–93	2	Tiszavasvári Alkaloida SE	3 / 16	33
1991–92	3	Tiszavasvári Lombik SE	1 / 16	46
1990–91	3	Tiszavasvári Lombik SE	4 / 16	39
1989–90	3	Tiszavasvári Lombik SE	3 / 16	55
1988–89	3	Tiszavasvári Lombik SE	3 / 16	66
1987–88	4	Tiszavasvári Lombik	1 / 16	48
1986–87	4	Tiszavasvári Lombik SE	9 / 16	27
1985–86	3	Tiszavasvári Lombik SE	15 / 16	20
1984–85	4	Tiszavasvári Lombik	1 / 18	48
1983–84	3	Tiszavasvári Lombik	15 / 16	20
1982–83	3	Tiszavasvári Lombik SE	7 / 16	31
1981–82	3	Tiszavasvári Lombik SE	4 / 16	38
1980–81	3	Tiszavasvári Lombik	3 / 16	38
1979–80	3	Tiszavasvári Lombik	5 / 16	32
1978–79	3	Tiszavasvári Lombik SE	2 / 16	38
1977–78	4	Tiszavasvári Lombik	9 / 16	30
1976–77	4	Tiszavasvári Lombik	3 / 16	35
1975–76	4	Tiszavasvári Lombik	3 / 16	38
1974–75	4	Tiszavasvári Lombik	2 / 16	48
1973–74	4	Tiszavasvári Lombik	7 / 16	30
1972–73	4	Tiszavasvári Lombik	6 / 16	32
1971–72	4	Tiszavasvári Lombik	9 / 16	28
1970–71	5	Tiszavasvári Lombik	1 / 16	46
1970	5	Tiszavasvári Lombik	1 / 8	23
1969	6	Tiszavasvári Lombik SE	1 / 14	44
1968	6	Tiszavasvári	2 / 14	43
1967	6	Tiszavasvári Lombik	5 / 14	29
1966	6	Tiszavasvári Lombik	4 / 14	32
1965	5	Tiszavasvári Lombik	15 / 17	22
1964	5	Tiszavasvári Lombik	10 / 18	30
1963	5	Tiszavasvári Lombik	6 / 18	17
1962–63	4	Tiszavasvári Lombik	11 / 16	23
1961–62	5	Tiszavasvári	1 / 12	35
1960–61	4	Tiszavasvári	17 / 18	17
1959–60	4	Tiszavasvári Lombik	12 / 16	26
1958–59	4	Tiszavasvári Lombik	7 / 16	31
1957–58	4	Tiszavasvári Lombik	6 / 14	26
1956	4	Tiszavasvári Traktor	1 / 14	35
1955	4	Tiszavasvári Szikra	6 / 14	27
1954	3	Tiszavasvári Szikra	10 / 14	19
1953	3	Tiszavasvári Szikra	9 / 14	19
1952	4	Tiszavasvári Szikra Alkaloida	1 / 3	
1951	4	Büdszentmihályi Szikra Alkaloida	0 / 10	
1950	4	Büdszentmihályi Lombik	7 / 14	15
1949–50	4	Büdszentmihályi Lombik	11 / 16	25
1948–49	5	Büdszentmihályi ATE	1 / 8	25
1947–48	4	Büdszentmihályi ATE	11 / 12	13
1946–47	4	Büdszentmihályi ATE	0 / 7	
