= Miskei ALC =

Hungarian football club

- Full name: Miskei Amatőr Labdarúgók Clubja
- Founded: 1953
- Dissolved: 2013
- Ground: Miskei Sportpálya
Home colours

Miskei Amatőr Labdarúgók Clubja is a professional football club based in Miske, Bács-Kiskun County, Hungary.

== History ==
Miskei ALC won the Alföld group of the 1990–91 Nemzeti Bajnokság III season, as Miskei Tsz SK, and gained promotion to the second division. However, Miske finished in the 14th position in the Eastern group of the 1991–92 Nemzeti Bajnokság II season and were relegated.

== Name changes ==
- Miskei Kinizsi: ? – ?
- Miskei TSZ SK: 1974 – ?
- Miskei ALC: ? – ?

== Honours ==
=== League ===
- Nemzeti Bajnokság III:
  - Winners (1): 1990–91

== Seasons ==
The highest league that Miskei ALC have ever played was the second tier.

Season	Tier	Club's name	Position	Pts
2012–13	5	Miskei ALC	3 / 16	51
2011–12	5	Miskei ALC	4 / 16	54
2010–11	6	Miskei ALC	1 / 14	72
2009–10	6	Miskei Amatör LC	6 / 16	56
2008–09	6	Miske	8 / 15	46
2007–08	6	Miskei ALC	7 / 15	38
2006–07	6	Miske	5 / 13	41
2005–06	6	Miske	6 / 11	27
2004–05	7	Miske	6 / 13	35
2003–04	7	Miske	6 / 15	47
2002–03	7	Miske	12 / 16	26
2001–02	7	Miske	4 / 14	51
2000–01	7	Miske	4 / 12	43
1999–2000	7	Miske	10 / 15	21
1998–99	6	Miske	16 / 16	16
1997–98	7	Miske	1 / 12	52
1996–97	6	Miske	5 / 12	43
1995–96	6	Miskei Amatőr LC	8 / 12	28
1994–95	6	Miske	8 / 13	30
1993–94	6	Miske	5 / 13	28
1992–93	3	Miske TSZ SK	11 / 16	25
1991–92	2	Miskei Tsz SK	14 / 16	22
1990–91	3	Miskei TSZ SK	1 / 16	49
1989–90	3	Miskei TSZ SK	3 / 16	54
1988–89	3	Miskei TSZ SK	5 / 16	51
1987–88	3	Miskei TSZ SK	3 / 16	43
1986–87	3	Miskei TSZ SK	3 / 16	37
1985–86	3	Miskei TSZ SK	7 / 16	29
1984–85	3	Miske TSZ SK	3 / 16	37
1983–84	4	Miskei TSz SK	1 / 16	44
1982–83	4	Miske	5 / 16	35
1981–82	4	Miskei TSz SK	4 / 16	39
1980–81	3	Miskei TSz SK	9 / 18	33
1979–80	4	Miske	1 / 16	51
1978–79	4	Miske	1 / 13	45
1977–78	5	Miske	6 / 14	30
1976–77	5	Miske	1 / 16	51
1975–76	6	Miske	2 / 15	42
1974–75	5	Miske	13 / 16	23
1973–74	7	Miske	1 / 11	40
1972–73	7	Miske	4 / 15	30
1971–72	6	Miske	15 / 16	13
1970–71	5	Miske	16 / 16	2
1970	5	Miske	15 / 16	9
1969	6	Miske	1 / 10	27
1968	6	Miske	6 / 14	
1967	6	Miske	7 / 9	10
1966	5	Miske	14 / 14	8
1965	6	Miske	1 / 12	37
1964	6	Miske	5 / 14	33
1963	6	Miske	3 / 8	15
1962–63	5	Miske	11 / 14	12
1961–62	5	Miske	8 / 14	17
1960–61	5	Miske	4 / 12	24
1958–59	5	Miske	4 / 9	12
1957–58	5	Miske	7 / 10	14
1957	5	Miske	2 / 7	18
1956	5	Miske	4 / 11	14
1955	5	Miske	6 / 12	24
1953	4	Miskei Kinizsi	8 / 11	7
