= Bag, Hungary =

Bag
- Flag Coat of arms

- Location of Bag in Hungary
- Coordinates: 47.6357°N 19.4837°E
- Country: Hungary
- Region: Central Hungary
- County: Pest
- Subregion: Aszódi
- Rank: Town

Area
  - Total: 23.55 km^{2} (9.09 sq mi)

Population (2010)
  - Total: 3,974
  - Density: 168.7/km^{2} (437.1/sq mi)
- Time zone: UTC+1 (CET)
  - Summer (DST): UTC+2 (CEST)
- Postal code: 2191
- Area code: +36 28
- Website: http://www.bagfalu.hu/

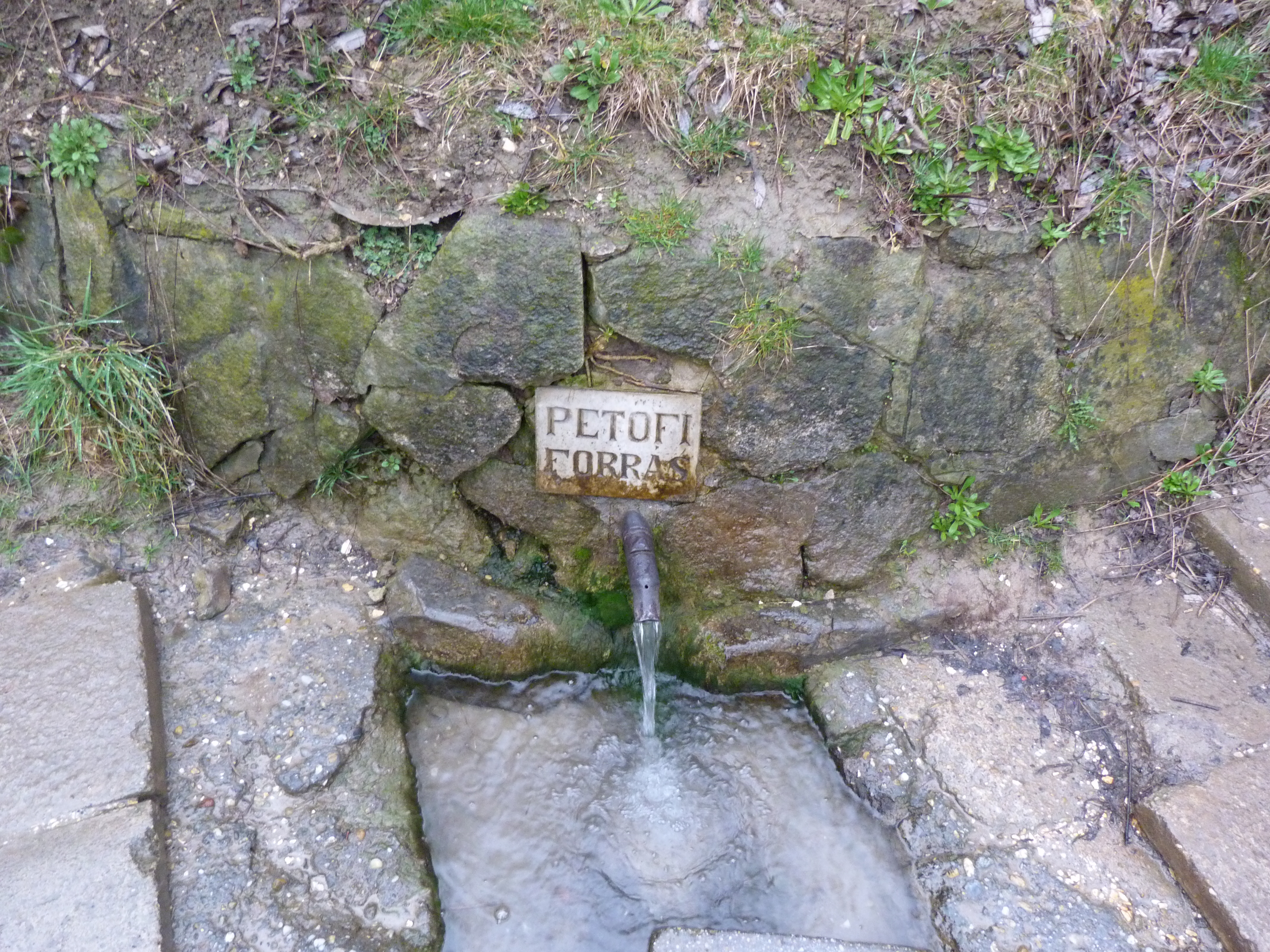
Petőfi well

Bag is a village in Pest County, Hungary.

== Sport ==
- Bagi TC '96, association football team
