= BFC Siófok =

Hungarian football club

Coordinates: 46°54′33.14″N 18°3′41.62″E

- Full name: Bodajk Futball Club Siófok
- Founded: 1921; 105 years ago
- Ground: Révész Géza utcai Stadion, Siófok
- Capacity: 6,500
- Manager: Dragan Vukmir
- League: NB III; Southwest
- 2023–24: NB II, 17th of 18 (relegated)
- Website: https://www.bfc-siofok.hu/
Home colours	Away colours	Third colours

Bodajk FC Siófok, generally shortened to BFC Siófok, is a Hungarian football club based in Siófok, a town on the shores of Lake Balaton.

== History ==
The club was founded in 1921 as Siófok SE.

Siófok won the Dráva group of the 1981–82 Nemzeti Bajnokság III and were advanced to the promotion play-offs. Siófok beat Balmazújvárosi TSZ SE 3-2 on aggregate and they were promoted to the second division.

The word Bodajk in the club's name stems from a merger with Bodajk FC in 2005. The colours of the club are yellow and blue. BFC Siófok plays its home matches in the Révész Géza utcai Stadion which has a capacity of 10,500.

In the Hungarian cup final of 1984, BFC Siófok defeated Rába Vasas ETO Gyõr, 2–1 and thus achieved its only major success.

BFC Siófok has been a member of the first division, the Nemzeti Bajnokság I, from 1985 to 1994, 1996 to 2000, and from 2002 to 2004. After the 2006/07 season, the club was again promoted to the NB I. However, this promotion was aided by the deduction of eight points from main rivals Haladás Szombathely for their use of ineligible players.

== Current squad ==
=== First team squad ===
As of 8 February 2024, according to the club's official website. Note: Flags indicate national team as defined under FIFA eligibility rules; some limited exceptions apply. Players may hold more than one non-FIFA nationality.

No.	Pos.	Nation	Player
3	DF	HUN	Ákos Debreceni (on loan from Paks)
4	DF	HUN	Viktor Vékony
5	DF	HUN	Gábor Vágó
6	DF	UKR	Oleksiy Shvedyuk (on loan from Pécs)
7	DF	HUN	Bence Varga
8	MF	HUN	Marcell Nemes
9	FW	HUN	Csanád Dénes
10	FW	HUN	Dávid László
11	DF	HUN	Gergő Major
14	MF	HUN	Nico György
16	MF	HUN	Zoltán Szedlár
17	FW	ROU	Áron Girsik
18	DF	HUN	Gábor Polényi
18	MF	HUN	Gergő Gyurkits (on loan from Paks)
19	MF	HUN	Bence Kovács
20	MF	HUN	Borisz Tóth (on loan from Diósgyőr)

No.	Pos.	Nation	Player
21	FW	HUN	Tamás Tóth
23	MF	HUN	Patrik Posztobányi (on loan from Puskás Akadémia)
24	FW	HUN	Zsombor Menyhárt
25	FW	HUN	Krisztián Schildkraut
26	GK	HUN	Dániel Winter
27	DF	HUN	Dávid Forgács
29	FW	HUN	Bence Balogh
37	MF	HUN	Miklós Kitl
55	DF	HUN	Zalán Debreceni (on loan from Paks)
61	DF	HUN	Martin Csató
67	FW	HUN	Ádám Kulifay
68	DF	HUN	János Hegedűs (on loan from Paks)
71	GK	HUN	Gergely Hutvágner
73	DF	HUN	Ádám Böndi
81	DF	HUN	Zoltán Varjas
92	FW	HUN	Barnabás Németh (on loan from Nyíregyháza)

=== Out on loan ===
Note: Flags indicate national team as defined under FIFA eligibility rules; some limited exceptions apply. Players may hold more than one non-FIFA nationality.

No.	Pos.	Nation	Player
—	MF	HUN	Dániel Nagy-Kolozsvári (at Eger until 30 June 2024)

== European Cup history ==
=== UEFA Cup Winners' Cup ===
Season	Competition	Round	Country	Club	Home	Away	Aggregate
1984–85	UEFA Cup Winners' Cup	1. Round	(Greece)	AEL	1–1	0–2	1–3

=== UEFA Intertoto Cup ===
Season	Competition	Round	Coun.	Club	Home	Away
1986	UEFA Intertoto Cup	Group 9	(Poland)	Lech Poznan	0–0	1–4
1986	UEFA Intertoto Cup	Group 9	(Austria)	Linzer ASK	0–0	1–1
1986	UEFA Intertoto Cup	Group 9	(Denmark)	Odense BK	0–2	4–5
1989	UEFA Intertoto Cup	Group 7	(Sweden)	Örebro SK	1–3	2–1
1989	UEFA Intertoto Cup	Group 7	(Czechoslovakia)	Slavia Praha	2–1	1–4
1989	UEFA Intertoto Cup	Group 7	(Switzerland)	FC Wettingen	0–3	1–3
1990	UEFA Intertoto Cup	Group 3	(Poland)	Lech Poznan	0–2	1–3
1990	UEFA Intertoto Cup	Group 3	(Israel)	Maccabi Haifa FC	0–0	0–3
1990	UEFA Intertoto Cup	Group 3	(Israel)	Bnei Yehuda FC	3–1	1–0
1991	UEFA Intertoto Cup	Group 6	(Switzerland)	Grasshopper FC	1–1	0–1
1991	UEFA Intertoto Cup	Group 6	(Denmark)	BK Frem	3–3	1–4
1991	UEFA Intertoto Cup	Group 6	(Socialist Federal Republic of Yugoslavia)	NK Olimpija Ljubljana	x-x	x-x
1992	UEFA Intertoto Cup	Group 2	(Czech Republic)	Sparta Praha	1–1	1–2
1992	UEFA Intertoto Cup	Group 2	(Austria)	SK Vorwärts Steyr	2–2	1–3
1992	UEFA Intertoto Cup	Group 2	(Switzerland)	FC Lausanne-Sport	1–0	1–0

== Record by country of opposition ==
- Correct as of 5 July 2010

Country	Pld	W	D	L	GF	GA	GD	Win%
Austria	4	0	3	1	3	5	−2	0.00
Czech Republic	4	1	1	2	5	8	−3	25.00
Denmark	4	0	1	3	8	14	−6	0.00
Greece	2	0	1	1	1	3	−2	0.00
Israel	4	2	1	1	4	4	+0	50.00
Poland	4	0	1	3	2	9	−7	0.00
Sweden	2	1	0	1	3	4	−1	50.00
Switzerland	6	2	1	3	4	8	−4	33.33
Totals	30	6	9	15	30	55	–25	20.00

P – Played; W – Won; D – Drawn; L – Lost

== Honours ==
- Magyar Kupa:
  - Winners (1): 1983–84
- Nemzeti Bajnokság II:
  - Winners (4): 1995–96, 2001–02, 2006–07, 2009–10
- Nemzeti Bajnokság III:
  - Winners (1): 1981–82
- Best Place in Nemzeti Bajnokság I: 4th place (1991–92, 2003–04)

== Name changes ==
- 1921–1956: Siófok SE
- 1956–1998: Siófok Bányász SK
- 1998–1999: Siófoki FC
- 1999: Balaton TV-Siófok FC
- 1999–2003: Siófoki FC
- 2003–2004: Balaton FC
- 2004–2005: Siófoki Bányász SE
- 2005–2006: Bodajk FC Siófok
- 2006–present: BFC Siófok

== First Division placings ==
Beginning in 1986, Siófok has participated in Hungary's top league for 17 seasons, in which they have finished in the top half only six times. Their best finish was 4th place in 1992 and 2004.

Year	MP	W	D	L	GF–GA	Dif.	Pts	Finish
1985–86	30	8	8	14	28–46	−18	24	14th place
1986–87	30	9	9	12	36–41	−5	27	13th place
1987–88	30	9	9	12	39–50	−11	27	12th place
1988–89	30	8	4/6	12	34–41	−7	38	12th place
1989–90	30	10	9	11	31–34	−3	39	7th place
1990–91	30	10	11	9	25–28	−3	31	7th place
1991–92	30	15	6	9	46–34	+12	36	4th place
1992–93	30	11	7	12	36–39	−3	29	8th place
1993–94	30	6	10	14	33–49	−16	22	14th place: Relegated
1996–97	34	10	10	14	36–53	−17	40	12th place
1997–98	34	11	8	15	38–43	−5	41	12th place
1998–99	34	7	9	18	32–49	−17	30	15th place
1999–00	32	7	7	18	26–51	−25	25	15th place: Relegated
2002–03	32	12	11	9	45–43	+2	47	5th place
2003–04	32	14	8	10	34–24	+10	50	4th place
2007–08	30	6	9	15	33–46	−13	27	14th place
2008–09	30	8	2	20	30–56	−26	26	15th place: Relegated
2010–11	30	8	10	12	29–41	−12	34	14th place
TOTALS	558	169	153	236	611–768	-157	593	

=== Season to season ===
Season	Division	Place	Hungarian Cup
1985–86	1ª	14th	
1986–87	1ª	13th	
1987–88	1ª	12th	
1988–89	1ª	12th	
1989–90	1ª	7th	
1990–91	1ª	7th	
1991–92	1ª	4th	
1992–93	1ª	8th	Round of 32
1993–94	1ª	13th	Semi-final
1994–95	2ª	3rd	—
1995–96	2ª	1st	—
1996–97	1ª	12th	Round of 32
1997–98	1ª	12th	Quarter-final

Season	Division	Place	Hungarian Cup
1998–99	1ª	15th	Round of 32
1999–00	1ª	15th	Round of 16
2000–01	2ª	8th	Round of 16
2001–02	2ª	1st	Round of 16
2002–03	1ª	5th	Quarter-final
2003–04	1ª	4th	Round of 32
2004–05	2ª	9th	Quarter-final
2005–06	2ª	7th	Round 2
2006–07	2ª	1st	Round 3
2007–08	1ª	14th	—
2008–09	1ª	15th	Semi-final
2009–10	2ª	1st	Round 3
2010–11	1ª	14th	Quarter-final

See Category:BFC Siófok players.

== Managers ==
- (Hungary) János Csank (2002 – May 3)
- (Hungary) Aurél Csertői (July 2003 – June 2004)
- (Hungary) Gábor Hartyáni (June 2005)
- (Hungary) Antal Botos (July 2006 – October 2007)
- (Hungary) Barnabás Tornyi (October 2007 – January 2008)
- (Italy) Aldo Dolcetti (January 2008 – June 2008)
- (Hungary) Lajos Détári (July 2008 – November 2008)
- (Hungary) Zoltán Aczél (January 2009 – June 2009)
- (Hungary) Károly Horváth (January 2010 – June 2010)
- (Hungary) István Mihalecz (July 2010 – June 2012) (Horváth had no UEFA pro licence until 2012, so Mihalecz acted as head coach.)
- (Hungary) Károly Horváth (July 2012–)
