= Péter Galaschek =

Hungarian footballer (born 1968)

Personal information
- Date of birth: 25 March 1968 (age 58)
- Place of birth: Budapest, Hungary
- Height: 1.81 m (5 ft 11 in)
- Position: Defender

Senior career*
Years	Team	Apps	(Gls)
1986–2000	Vasas SC		
2000	Rákospalotai EAC		
2001	Újpest FC		
2002	Pécsi MFC		
- * Club domestic league appearances and goals

Péter Galaschek (born 25 March 1968) is a Hungarian former professional footballer who played as a defender.
