= Fűzfői AK =

Hungarian football club

- Full name: Fűzfői Atlétikai Klub
- Founded: 1928; 98 years ago
- Ground: Városi Stadion
- Website: https://fuzfoak.hu/
Home colours	Away colours

Fűzfői Atlétikai Klub is a professional football club based in Balatonfűzfő, Veszprém County, Hungary, that competes in the Bács-Kiskun county league.

== History ==
Fűzfő won the 1981–82 Nemzeti Bajnokság III; however, they lost to Nagybátonyi Bányász 7-4 on aggregate and therefore they were not promoted to the second division.

== Name changes ==
- 1928–?: Fűzfői Atlétikai Klub
- ?–1949: Fűzfői MTE
- 1949–1951: Fűzfői Lombik
- 1949: merger with Fűzfői Honpapír
- 1951–1956: Fűzfői Szikra SE
- 1956–1969: Fűzfői Atlétikai Klub
- 1969–1996: NIKE Fűzfői AK
- 1996–present: Fűzfői Atlétikai Klub

== Honours ==
- Nemzeti Bajnokság III:
  - Winners (2): 1975–76, 1981–82

== Seasons ==
The table below shows the seasons of Fűzfői AK.

Season	Tier	Club's name	Position	Pts
1930–31	3	Fűzfői AK	3 / 8	14
1931–32	3	Fűzfői AK	4 / 8	12
1932–33	3	Fűzfői AK	3 / 7	17
1933–34	3	Fűzfői AK	3 / 11	28
1934–35	3	Fűzfői AK	3 / 11	34
1935–36	3	Fűzfői AK	1 / 10	
1936–37	2	Fűzfői AK	11 / 13	20
1937–38	2	Fűzfői AK	9 / 14	23
1938–39	3	Fűzfői AK	6 / 14	28
1939–40	3	Fűzfői AK	4 / 14	31
1940–41	4	Fűzfői AK	2 / 14	33
1941–42	4	Fűzfői AK	5 / 14	33
1942–43	4	Fűzfői AK	3 / 10	24
1943–44	4	Fűzfői AK	6 / 12	23
1944–45	3	Fűzfői AK	0 / 11	
1945–46	3	Fűzfői MTE	1 / 8	
1946–47	3	Fűzfői MTE	12 / 12	12
1947–48	3	Fűzfői MTE	14 / 16	17
1948–49	3	Fűzfői MTE	9 / 16	30
1949–50	3	Fűzfői Lombik	3 / 16	34
1950	2	Fűzfői Lombik	16 / 16	6
1951	3	Fűzfői Szikra	8 / 14	24
1952	3	Fűzfői Szikra	8 / 14	24
1953	3	Fűzfői Szikra	9 / 16	30
1954	3	Fűzfői Szikra SE	1 / 16	48
1955	3	Fűzfői Szikra SE	5 / 16	35
1956	3	Fűzfői Szikra SE	3 / 14	41
1957	3	Fűzfői AK	6 / 10	16
1957–58	4	Fűzfői AK	4 / 18	49
1958–59	4	Fűzfői AK	5 / 16	34
1959–60	4	Fűzfői AK	9 / 17	32
1960–61	4	Fűzfői AK	3 / 18	40
1961–62	4	Fűzfői AK	7 / 16	33
1962–63	4	Fűzfői AK	3 / 16	46
1963	5	Fűzfői AK	4 / 18	23
1964	5	Fűzfői AK	2 / 18	49
1965	5	Fűzfői AK	1 / 18	44
1966	4	Fűzfői AK	1 / 16	45
1967	3	Fűzfői AK	14 / 16	27
1968	4	Fűzfői AK	1 / 16	45
1969	3	NIKE Fűzfői AK	9 / 16	28
1970	3	NIKE Fűzfői AK	10 / 16	14
1970–71	3	NIKE Fűzfői AK	11 / 16	27
1971–72	3	NIKE Fűzfői AK	2 / 16	36
1972–73	3	NIKE Fűzfői AK	5 / 16	31
1973–74	3	NIKE Fűzfői AK	2 / 16	43
1974–75	3	NIKE Fűzfői AK	6 / 20	38
1975–76	3	NIKE Fűzfői AK	1 / 19	58
1976–77	2	NIKE Fűzfői AK	16 / 20	32
1977–78	2	NIKE Fűzfői AK	15 / 20	33
1978–79	2	NIKE Fűzfői AK	18 / 20	30
1979–80	3	NIKE Fűzfői AK	1 / 16	53
1980–81	2	NIKE Fűzfői SE	19 / 20	23
1981–82	3	NIKE Fűzfői AK	1 / 18	49
1982–83	3	NIKE Fűzfői AK	5 / 18	37
1983–84	3	Nike-Fűzfői AK	9 / 18	35
1984–85	3	NIKE Fűzfői AK	9 / 18	31
1985–86	3	NIKE Fűzfői AK	17 / 18	17
1986–87	4	NIKE Fűzfői AK	2 / 16	48
1987–88	4	NIKE Fűzfői AK	1 / 16	53
1988–89	3	NIKE Fűzfői AK	11 / 16	41
1989–90	3	Nike Fűzfői AK	7 / 16	40
1990–91	3	Fűzfő	7 / 16	32
1991–92	3	Nike-Fűzfői AK	14 / 16	17
1992–93	4	NIKE Fűzfői AK	3 / 16	47
1993–94	4	Fűzfői AK	8 / 16	31
1994–95	4	NIKE Fűzfői AK	9 / 16	31
1995–96	4	Nitrokémia Fűzfői AK	12 / 18	37
1996–97	4	Fűzfői AK	6 / 18	48
1997–98	5	Fűzfői AK	12 / 16	28
1998–99	5	Fűzfői AK	8 / 16	39
1999–00	5	Fűzfői AK	14 / 16	25
2000–01	5	Fűzfői AK	11 / 16	34
2001–02	5	Fűzfői AK	15 / 16	16
2004–05	7	Balatonfűzfő	2 / 13	58
2005–06	5	Fűzfői AK	4 / 14	52
2006–07	5	Fűzfői AK	10 / 13	22
2007–08	5	Fűzfői AK	11 / 15	25
2008–09	5	Fűzfői AK	9 / 13	24
2009–10	5	Fűzfői AK	9 / 12	24
2010–11	5	Fűzfői AK	1 / 11	46
2011–12	4	Fűzfői AK	9 / 15	37
2012–13	4	Fűzfői AK	8 / 16	42
2013–14	4	Fűzfői AK	3 / 16	57
2014–15	4	Fűzfői AK	2 / 16	61
2015–16	4	Fűzfői AK	12 / 18	43
2016–17	4	Fűzfői AK	3 / 16	58
2017–18	4	Fűzfői AK	5 / 16	45
2018–19	4	Fűzfői AK	12 / 16	30
2019–20	4	Fűzfői AK	6 / 16	36
2020–21	4	Fűzfői AK	6 / 15	51
2021–22	4	Fűzfői AK	9 / 16	45
2022–23	4	Fűzfői AK	13 / 16	19
2023–24	4	Fűzfői AK	2 / 16	70
2024–25	4	Fűzfői AK	15 / 15	
