= 1991–92 Nemzeti Bajnokság II =

Nemzeti Bajnokság II
- Season: 1991–92
- Champions: Csepel SC (West); Békéscsaba 1912 Előre (East)
- Promoted: Csepel SC (West); Békéscsaba 1912 Előre (East); Nyíregyháza Spartacus FC (East)
- Relegated: FC Ajka (West); Rákospalota (West); Oroszlányi Bányász SE (West); Kecskeméti SC (East); Miskei TSZ SK (East); Szolnok (East)

The 1991–92 Nemzeti Bajnokság II was the 94th season of the Nemzeti Bajnokság II, the second tier of the Hungarian football league.

== League table ==
=== Western group ===
Pos	Team	Pld	W	D	L	GF	GA	GD	Pts	Promotion or relegation
1	Csepel SC	30	17	8	5	57	21	+36	42	Promotion to Nemzeti Bajnokság I
2	BKV Előre SC	30	14	9	7	40	23	+17	37	
3	Dorogi Bányász SC	30	13	10	7	34	20	+14	36	
4	Dunaferr SE	30	15	5	10	43	38	+5	35	
5	Sabaria-Tipo SE	30	12	10	8	29	24	+5	34	
6	Soproni LC	30	12	8	10	38	31	+7	32	
7	Paksi Atomerőmű SE	30	13	6	11	44	40	+4	32	
8	III. Kerületi TVE	30	11	9	10	26	25	+1	31	
9	Nagykanizsai Olajbányász SE	30	10	10	10	47	44	+3	30	
10	Erzsébeti SMTK	30	13	4	13	42	46	−4	30	
11	Szekszárdi Dózsa SE	30	9	11	10	31	34	−3	29	
12	Bajai FC	30	10	7	13	28	32	−4	27	
13	Mohácsi TSZ SE	30	4	15	11	24	32	−8	23	
14	Ajkai Bányász SE	30	9	5	16	32	46	−14	23	Relegation to Nemzeti Bajnokság III
15	Rákospalotai EAC	30	6	8	16	28	53	−25	20	Relegation to Nemzeti Bajnokság III
16	Oroszlányi Bányász SE	30	5	9	16	25	59	−34	19	Relegation to Nemzeti Bajnokság III

=== Eastern group ===
Pos	Team	Pld	W	D	L	GF	GA	GD	Pts	Promotion or relegation
1	Békéscsabai Előre FC	30	20	5	5	62	22	+40	45	Promotion to Nemzeti Bajnokság I
2	Nyíregyházi VSSC	30	18	6	6	46	25	+21	42	Promotion to Nemzeti Bajnokság I
3	Kabai Egyetértés SE	30	18	4	8	57	33	+24	40	
4	Szeged SC	30	14	9	7	46	22	+24	37	
5	Debreceni VSC	30	12	12	6	51	22	+29	36	
6	Hatvani KVSC-DEKO	30	11	12	7	33	21	+12	34	
7	Szarvasi Vasas SSE	30	12	9	9	36	35	+1	33	
8	Bagi FC	30	12	6	12	41	40	+1	30	
9	Eger SE	30	9	10	11	34	45	−11	28	
10	Budafoki MTE-Törley	30	10	7	13	37	47	−10	27	
11	Kazincbarcikai Vegyész SE	30	11	4	15	31	41	−10	26	
12	Salgótarjáni SE	30	9	6	15	29	42	−13	24	
13	Hajdúnánási FC	30	7	10	13	25	41	−16	24	
14	Miskei TSZ SK	30	6	10	14	27	48	−21	22	Relegation to Nemzeti Bajnokság III
15	Kecskeméti SC	30	5	7	18	24	57	−33	17	Relegation to Nemzeti Bajnokság III
16	Szolnoki MÁV MTE	30	5	5	20	18	56	−38	15	Relegation to Nemzeti Bajnokság III

== Promotion play-offs ==
=== Play-off 1 ===
Nyíregyházi VSC - Haladás VSE: 1-0

Haladás VSE - Nyíregyházi VSC 1-0 (penalties 3-5)

=== Play-off 2 ===
Diósgyőri FC - BKV Előre SC 2-1

BKV Előre - Diósgyőri FC 0-1

== See also ==
- 1991–92 Magyar Kupa
- 1991–92 Nemzeti Bajnokság I
