= József Gregor =

Hungarian footballer (born 1963)

Personal information
- Date of birth: 16 November 1963 (age 62)
- Place of birth: Budapest, Hungary
- Position: Striker

Senior career*
Years	Team	Apps	(Gls)
1982–1988	Építők SC		
1988–1991	Budapest Honvéd FC	84	(31)
1991–1992	Siófoki Bányász	27	(7)
1992–1994	Ferencvárosi TC	42	(11)
2008–2013	Magyar Viscosa Nyergesújfalu	8	(3)

International career
1988–1991	Hungary	6	(0)
- * Club domestic league appearances and goals

József Gregor (born 30 November 1963) is a retired Hungarian football striker. He became Nemzeti Bajnokság I top goalscorer in 1990–91 and was capped for Hungary.
