= 2024–25 Megyei Bajnokság I =

Megyei Bajnokság I
- Season: 2024–25
- Top goalscorer: Czeglédi (Zsámbék), 37 goals

The 2024–25 Megyei Bajnokság I includes the championships of 20 counties in Hungary. It is the fourth tier of the Hungarian football league system.

Ten teams promoted to 2025–26 Nemzeti Bajnokság III: Békéscsaba II and Zsámbék without Promotion play-offs, and the following eight teams in the Promotion play-offs: Tarpa, Perutz, Karancslapujtő, Ózd, Gödöllő, Szeged II, Balatonlelle and Dunaújváros.

== Teams ==
The following teams have changed division since the 2023–24 season.

County	To Megyei Bajnokság I		From Megyei Bajnokság I				Ref.
County	Relegated from Nemzeti Bajnokság III	Promoted from Megyei Bajnokság II	Promoted to Nemzeti Bajnokság III	Relegated to		Dissolved	
County	Relegated from Nemzeti Bajnokság III	Promoted from Megyei Bajnokság II	Promoted to Nemzeti Bajnokság III	Megyei Bajnokság II	Megyei Bajnokság III	Dissolved	
Bács-Kiskun	—N/a	Solt	—N/a				
Baranya	Mohács	Harkány	—N/a		Pécsvárad	—N/a	
Békés	Füzesgyarmat	Kondoros; Dévaványa; Békés	Gyula	—N/a	Medgyesbodzás	—N/a	
Borsod-Abaúj-Zemplén	—N/a	Mályi; Szerencs	—N/a	Bőcs; Sárospatak	—N/a		
Budapest	Rákospalota	Budai; Flotta 2001	Csepel TC	Pestszentimre; Szent István	—N/a		
Csongrád-Csanád	Szeged II	Sándorfalva; Deszk	Szegedi VSE	Ásotthalom; FK Szeged	—N/a		
Fejér	Dunaújváros	Adony	Főnix	Mány-Bicske II	Tordas	—N/a	
Győr-Moson-Sopron	Csorna	Győrszentiván; Fertőszentmiklós	—N/a		Lipót	—N/a	
Hajdú-Bihar	—N/a	Bocskai; Kaba; Téglás	—N/a	Nagyrábé	—N/a		
Heves	Gyöngyös	Vámosgyörk	Füzesabony	Bélapát; Petőfibánya	—N/a	Eger II	
Jász-Nagykun-Szolnok	—N/a	Jászapáti; Tiszaszentimre	Tiszaföldvár	Kunhegyes	—N/a		
Komárom-Esztergom	—N/a						
Nógrád	—N/a	Vizslás; Balassagyarmat; Szügy	—N/a	Építők	Érsekvadkert	Palotás	
Pest	Cegléd	Pomáz; Diósd	Dunaharaszti	Veresegyház; Felsőpakony	—N/a		
Somogy	—N/a	Kaposmérő	—N/a	Öreglak; Segesd	—N/a		
Szabolcs-Szatmár-Bereg	—N/a	Gergelyiugornya; Baktalórántháza; Nyírvasvári	Mátészalka; Nyíregyháza II	Kállósemjén	—N/a	Nyírbéltek	
Tolna	TBA						
Vas	—N/a			Nádasd; Bük	Táplán	Haladás II	
Veszprém	—N/a			Magyarpolány	—N/a		
Zala	Zalaegerszeg II	—N/a		Murakeresztúr	—N/a		

== Tables ==
=== Bács-Kiskun ===
Pos	Team	Pld	W	D	L	GF	GA	GD	Pts	Promotion or relegation
1	Tiszakécske II (Note: Note: The Promotion play-offs was theoretically announced for the county champions, but there were champion teams that did not agree to participate in Nemzeti Bajnokság III. In such cases, the right was transferred to the second or third place team – in the first division of Budapest to the second-placed Csepel UFC, in Heves county to the bronze medalist Gyöngyös – and there were two counties (Bács-Kiskun: Tiszakécske II, Győr-Moson-Sopron: Koroncó) from which no club participated in the qualifier.) (C)	30	19	6	5	84	38	+46	63	
2	Harta	30	18	6	6	74	40	+34	60	
3	Kunbaja	30	17	9	4	50	18	+32	60	
4	Lajosmizse	30	17	8	5	60	30	+30	59	
5	Baja	30	14	10	6	52	27	+25	52	
6	Jánoshalma	30	13	7	10	69	51	+18	46	
7	Solt	30	13	7	10	55	37	+18	46	
8	Soltvadkert	30	11	12	7	56	45	+11	45	
9	Kalocsa	30	12	8	10	59	52	+7	44	
10	Kiskunfélegyháza	30	12	6	12	66	45	+21	42	
11	Kecel	30	12	5	13	53	51	+2	41	
12	Kiskőrös	30	11	7	12	45	50	−5	40	
13	Kecskeméti LC	30	8	4	18	27	52	−25	28	
14	Hírös-Ép	30	6	8	16	38	56	−18	26	
15	Bácsalmás (R)	30	2	2	26	16	114	−98	8	Relegation to Megyei Bajnokság II
16	Akasztó (R)	30	1	3	26	25	123	−98	6	Relegation to Megyei Bajnokság II

Updated to match(es) played on 25 May 2025. Source: Hungarian Football Federation
(C) Champions; (R) Relegated

=== Baranya ===
Pos	Team	Pld	W	D	L	GF	GA	GD	Pts	Promotion or relegation
1	Mohács (C)	24	16	5	3	58	20	+38	53	Qualification for promotion play-offs
2	Komlói Bányász	24	13	7	4	59	36	+23	46	
3	Nagykozár	24	13	2	9	42	35	+7	41	
4	Pécsi EAC II	24	11	6	7	49	37	+12	39	
5	Villány (Note: 4 penalty point deducted from Villány)	24	11	5	8	43	41	+2	34	
6	Bóly	24	9	2	13	30	46	−16	29	
7	Harkány	24	6	6	12	32	48	−16	24	
8	Siklós	24	6	1	17	34	55	−21	19	
9	Pécsi VSK (R)	24	4	4	16	17	46	−29	16	Relegation to Megyei Bajnokság II

Updated to match(es) played on 31 May 2025. Source: Hungarian Football Federation
(C) Champions; (R) Relegated

=== Békés ===
Pos	Team	Pld	W	D	L	GF	GA	GD	Pts	Promotion or relegation
1	Békéscsaba II (C)	22	18	2	2	93	23	+70	56	Qualification for promotion play-offs
2	OMTK-ULE	22	17	3	2	61	23	+38	54	
3	Szarvas	22	14	5	3	68	27	+41	47	
4	Kondoros	22	13	5	4	48	30	+18	44	
5	Jamina	22	7	9	6	32	26	+6	30	
6	Mezőhegyes	22	7	4	11	45	48	−3	25	
7	Szeghalom	22	6	5	11	51	59	−8	23	
8	Dévaványa	22	6	5	11	41	58	−17	23	
9	Nagyszénás	22	5	3	14	28	48	−20	18	
10	Gyomaendrőd	22	4	5	13	25	67	−42	17	
11	Békés (R)	22	4	4	14	24	65	−41	16	Relegation to Megyei Bajnokság II
12	Füzesgyarmat (R)	22	4	4	14	23	65	−42	16	Relegation to Megyei Bajnokság II

Updated to match(es) played on 19 April 2025. Source: Hungarian Football Federation
(C) Champions; (R) Relegated

=== Borsod-Abaúj-Zemplén ===
Pos	Team	Pld	W	D	L	GF	GA	GD	Pts	Promotion or relegation
1	Ózd-Sajóvölgye FSE (C)	26	20	5	1	95	22	+73	65	Qualification for promotion play-offs
2	Miskolc	26	17	3	6	74	45	+29	54	
3	Emőd	26	15	7	4	64	37	+27	52	
4	Mezőkeresztes	26	15	5	6	57	43	+14	50	
5	Sajóbábony (Note: 1 penalty point deducted from Sajóbábony)	26	14	5	7	56	34	+22	46	
6	Parasznya	26	11	3	12	40	43	−3	36	
7	Tállya	26	10	6	10	45	45	0	36	
8	Felsőzsolca	26	8	9	9	51	52	−1	33	
9	Gesztely	26	10	2	14	57	67	−10	32	
10	Alsózsolca	26	8	7	11	39	51	−12	31	
11	Edelény	26	7	7	12	42	50	−8	28	
12	Bánhorváti	26	4	6	16	30	55	−25	18	
13	Szirmabesenyő	26	4	3	19	31	78	−47	15	
14	Szerencs (Note: Szerencs was relegated) (R)	26	4	2	20	29	88	−59	14	Relegation to Megyei Bajnokság II
15	Hidasnémeti (Note: Competition Committee decision: Hidasnémeti disqualified, results cancelled.) (E)	0	0	0	0	0	0	0	0	Relegation to Megyei Bajnokság II
16	Mályi (Note: Competition Committee decision: Mályi disqualified, results cancelled.) (E)	0	0	0	0	0	0	0	0	Relegation to Megyei Bajnokság II

Updated to match(es) played on 31 May 2025. Source: Hungarian Football Federation
(C) Champions; (E) Eliminated; (R) Relegated

=== Budapest ===
Pos	Team	Pld	W	D	L	GF	GA	GD	Pts	Promotion or relegation
1	Unione FC (Note: Note: The Promotion play-offs was theoretically announced for the county champions, but there were champion teams that did not agree to participate in Nemzeti Bajnokság III. In such cases, the right was transferred to the second or third place team – in the first division of Budapest to the second-placed Csepel UFC, in Heves county to the bronze medalist Gyöngyös – and there were two counties (Bács-Kiskun: Tiszakécske II, Győr-Moson-Sopron: Koroncó) from which no club participated in the qualifier.) (C)	30	21	5	4	95	24	+71	68	
2	Csepel UFC	30	18	6	6	61	35	+26	60	Qualification for promotion play-offs
3	Budafok II	30	18	6	6	52	29	+23	60	
4	SZAC	30	16	7	7	53	34	+19	55	
5	Szabadkikötő	30	15	6	9	70	49	+21	51	
6	Rákospalota	30	15	5	10	62	39	+23	50	
7	Testnevelési Főiskola	30	12	9	9	54	41	+13	45	
8	Flotta 2001	30	11	11	8	40	43	−3	44	
9	Fővárosi Vízművek	30	13	7	10	59	66	−7	46	
10	43. Sz. Építők	30	11	7	12	48	47	+1	40	
11	Testvériség	30	9	7	14	49	58	−9	34	
12	Issimo	30	8	9	13	41	46	−5	33	
13	Ludovika	30	9	4	17	35	64	−29	31	
14	II. Kerület UFC	30	8	7	15	43	51	−8	31	
15	Gázgyár (R)	30	2	5	23	29	76	−47	11	Relegation to Megyei Bajnokság II
16	Budai FC (R)	30	3	1	26	14	103	−89	10	Relegation to Megyei Bajnokság II

Updated to match(es) played on 24 May 2025. Source: Hungarian Football Federation
(C) Champions; (R) Relegated

=== Csongrád-Csanád ===
==== Regular stage ====
Pos	Team	Pld	W	D	L	GF	GA	GD	Pts	Qualification
1	Szeged II	22	20	2	0	96	16	+80	62	Qualification for promotion group
2	Sándorfalva	22	14	6	2	55	21	+34	48	Qualification for promotion group
3	Makó	22	12	5	5	42	20	+22	41	Qualification for promotion group
4	Algyő	22	11	6	5	44	20	+24	39	Qualification for promotion group
5	Tiszasziget	22	10	8	4	62	33	+29	38	Qualification for promotion group
6	Kiskundorozsma	22	10	2	10	40	38	+2	32	Qualification for promotion group
7	Szentes	22	9	3	10	31	53	−22	30	Qualification for relegation group
8	Mórahalom	22	7	4	11	35	41	−6	25	Qualification for relegation group
9	Deszk	22	7	2	13	33	52	−19	23	Qualification for relegation group
10	Bordány	22	5	3	14	32	69	−37	18	Qualification for relegation group
11	Hódmezővásárhely II	22	3	1	18	21	72	−51	10	Qualification for relegation group
12	Balástya	22	2	2	18	13	69	−56	8	Qualification for relegation group

Updated to match(es) played on 22 March 2025. Source: Hungarian Football Federation

==== Promotion group ====
Pos	Team	Pld	W	D	L	GF	GA	GD	Pts	Qualification
1	Szeged II (C)	32	29	2	1	121	22	+99	89	Qualification for promotion play-offs
2	Sándorfalva	32	20	8	4	74	29	+45	68	
3	Algyő	32	15	8	9	56	35	+21	53	
4	Makó	32	15	7	10	61	44	+17	52	
5	Tiszasziget	32	11	12	9	75	53	+22	45	
6	Kiskundorozsma	32	11	4	17	48	61	−13	37	

Updated to match(es) played on 31 May 2025. Source: Hungarian Football Federation
(C) Champions

==== Relegation group ====
Pos	Team	Pld	W	D	L	GF	GA	GD	Pts	Qualification
1	Szentes	32	14	5	13	57	72	−15	47	
2	Mórahalom	32	11	9	12	60	55	+5	42	
3	Bordány	32	11	5	16	57	81	−24	38	
4	Deszk	32	11	2	19	57	69	−12	35	
5	Hódmezővásárhely II	32	7	2	23	43	111	−68	23	
6	Balástya (R)	32	3	4	25	20	97	−77	13	Relegation to Megyei Bajnokság II

Updated to match(es) played on 31 May 2025. Source: Hungarian Football Federation
(R) Relegated

=== Fejér ===
Pos	Team	Pld	W	D	L	GF	GA	GD	Pts	Promotion or relegation
1	Dunaújváros (C)	26	23	2	1	99	14	+85	71	Qualification for promotion play-offs
2	Mór	26	20	1	5	95	25	+70	61	
3	Sárbogárd	26	20	1	5	96	27	+69	61	
4	Sárosd	26	16	1	9	69	35	+34	49	
5	Lajoskomárom	26	14	4	8	61	38	+23	46	
6	Kápolnásnyék	26	13	4	9	57	40	+17	43	
7	Martonvásár	26	12	4	10	50	45	+5	40	
8	Csór	26	11	4	11	70	51	+19	37	
9	Ercsi Kinizsi	26	8	5	13	60	56	+4	29	
10	Mezőfalva	26	8	4	14	50	62	−12	28	
11	Adony	26	8	4	14	35	65	−30	28	
12	Maroshegy	26	7	4	15	50	51	−1	25	
13	Bodajk (R)	26	2	0	24	22	136	−114	6	Relegation to Megyei Bajnokság II
14	Enying (R)	26	1	0	25	10	179	−169	3	Relegation to Megyei Bajnokság II

Updated to match(es) played on 31 May 2025. Source: Hungarian Football Federation
(C) Champions; (R) Relegated

=== Győr-Moson-Sopron ===
Pos	Team	Pld	W	D	L	GF	GA	GD	Pts	Promotion or relegation
1	Koroncó (Note: Note: The Promotion play-offs was theoretically announced for the county champions, but there were champion teams that did not agree to participate in Nemzeti Bajnokság III. In such cases, the right was transferred to the second or third place team – in the first division of Budapest to the second-placed Csepel UFC, in Heves county to the bronze medalist Gyöngyös – and there were two counties (Bács-Kiskun: Tiszakécske II, Győr-Moson-Sopron: Koroncó) from which no club participated in the qualifier.) (C)	30	25	3	2	123	33	+90	78	
2	Kapuvár	30	25	2	3	97	22	+75	77	
3	Mezőörs	30	22	5	3	106	32	+74	71	
4	Csorna	30	19	3	8	93	33	+60	60	
5	Győrújbarát	30	18	3	9	66	40	+26	57	
6	Vitnyéd	30	14	6	10	63	59	+4	48	
7	Bácsa	30	13	7	10	60	47	+13	46	
8	Hegykő	30	13	3	14	42	47	−5	42	
9	Gönyű	30	12	2	16	53	81	−28	38	
10	Nádorváros	30	10	6	14	48	68	−20	36	
11	Abda	30	10	5	15	53	61	−8	35	
12	Mosonmagyaróvár II	30	8	3	19	44	67	−23	27	
13	Ménfőcsanak	30	8	1	21	40	82	−42	25	
14	Győrújfalu	30	6	2	22	35	105	−70	20	
15	Fertőszentmiklós (R)	30	3	7	20	22	70	−48	16	Relegation to Megyei Bajnokság II
16	Győrszentiván (R)	30	4	2	24	19	117	−98	14	Relegation to Megyei Bajnokság II

Updated to match(es) played on 31 May 2025. Source: Hungarian Football Federation
(C) Champions; (R) Relegated

=== Hajdú-Bihar ===
Pos	Team	Pld	W	D	L	GF	GA	GD	Pts	Promotion or relegation
1	Hajdúnánás (C)	30	23	4	3	102	28	+74	73	Qualification for promotion play-offs
2	Hajdúszoboszló	30	23	3	4	91	26	+65	72	
3	Hajdúsámson	30	21	3	6	92	29	+63	66	
4	Monostorpályi	30	18	7	5	72	31	+41	61	
5	Sárrétudvari	30	15	4	11	61	50	+11	49	
6	Berettyóújfalu	30	13	10	7	51	34	+17	49	
7	Balmazújváros	30	15	3	12	59	48	+11	48	
8	Bestrong (Debrecen)	30	12	3	15	49	46	+3	39	
9	DEAC II	30	12	3	15	67	70	−3	39	
10	Kaba (Note: 1 penalty point deducted from Kaba)	30	12	1	17	47	60	−13	36	
11	Létavértes (Note: 5 penalty point deducted from Létavértes)	30	11	5	14	60	64	−4	33	
12	Nyíradony	30	9	5	16	33	63	−30	32	
13	Bocskai (Vámospércs)	30	8	6	16	51	78	−27	30	
14	Hajdúböszörmény	30	7	6	17	36	73	−37	27	
15	Egyek (R)	30	2	8	20	32	101	−69	14	Relegation to Megyei Bajnokság II
16	Téglás (R)	30	1	5	24	22	124	−102	8	Relegation to Megyei Bajnokság II

Updated to match(es) played on 31 May 2025. Source: Hungarian Football Federation
(C) Champions; (R) Relegated

=== Heves ===
Pos	Team	Pld	W	D	L	GF	GA	GD	Pts	Promotion or relegation
1	Lőrinci (C)	30	24	1	5	103	28	+75	73	Qualification for promotion play-offs
2	Egerszalók	30	20	6	4	82	33	+49	66	
3	Gyöngyös	30	20	4	6	89	36	+53	64	
4	Heves	30	18	4	8	83	43	+40	58	
5	Gyöngyöshalász	30	18	2	10	64	41	+23	56	
6	Andornaktálya	30	13	4	13	57	52	+5	43	
7	Maklár	30	7	9	14	64	70	−6	30	
8	Heréd (Note: 3 penalty point deducted from Heréd)	30	8	5	17	54	80	−26	26	
9	Besenyőtelek	30	8	2	20	42	86	−44	26	
10	Energia	30	7	3	20	45	71	−26	24	
11	Vámosgyörk (Note: 5 penalty point deducted from Vámosgyörk) (R)	30	1	2	27	30	173	−143	0	Relegation to Megyei Bajnokság II

Updated to match(es) played on 31 May 2025. Source: Hungarian Football Federation
(C) Champions; (R) Relegated

=== Jász-Nagykun-Szolnok ===
Pos	Team	Pld	W	D	L	GF	GA	GD	Pts	Promotion or relegation
1	Törökszentmiklós (C)	30	24	5	1	123	23	+100	77	Qualification for promotion play-offs
2	Mezőtúr	30	24	1	5	111	25	+86	73	
3	Jászfényszaru	30	20	2	8	108	35	+73	62	
4	Rákóczifalva	30	19	4	7	77	49	+28	61	
5	Kenderes	30	18	3	9	94	44	+50	57	
6	Szajol	30	17	5	8	83	50	+33	56	
7	Jászberény	30	17	4	9	81	40	+41	55	
8	Kisújszállás	30	16	3	11	67	57	+10	51	
9	Jánoshida	30	14	3	13	59	62	−3	45	
10	Lurkó Focimánia	30	9	5	16	37	62	−25	32	
11	Tószeg	30	9	5	16	49	78	−29	32	
12	Cserkeszőlő	30	7	5	18	40	89	−49	26	
13	Tiszaszentimre	30	5	5	20	42	109	−67	20	
14	Jászapáti	30	4	8	18	31	95	−64	20	
15	Tiszagyenda	30	2	5	23	25	108	−83	11	
16	Kunszentmárton (R)	30	2	3	25	29	130	−101	9	Relegation to Megyei Bajnokság II

Updated to match(es) played on 31 May 2025. Source: Hungarian Football Federation
(C) Champions; (R) Relegated

=== Komárom-Esztergom ===
Pos	Team	Pld	W	D	L	GF	GA	GD	Pts	Promotion or relegation
1	Zsámbék (C)	24	19	4	1	112	12	+100	61	Qualification for promotion play-offs
2	Tata	24	18	4	2	143	21	+122	58	
3	Koppánymonostor	24	17	3	4	101	24	+77	54	
4	Sárisáp	24	16	6	2	81	25	+56	54	
5	Nyergesújfalu	24	16	3	5	74	34	+40	51	
6	Vértessomló	24	11	4	9	61	56	+5	37	
7	Tát	24	8	7	9	40	46	−6	31	
8	Bábolna	24	7	6	11	58	46	+12	27	
9	Lábatlan	24	7	2	15	39	77	−38	23	
10	Kecskéd	24	4	5	15	31	82	−51	17	
11	Esztergom	24	3	2	19	23	111	−88	11	
12	Vértesszőlős	24	3	1	20	21	113	−92	10	
13	Almásfüzitő (R)	24	2	3	19	24	161	−137	9	Relegation to Megyei Bajnokság II

Updated to match(es) played on 31 May 2025. Source: Hungarian Football Federation
(C) Champions; (R) Relegated

=== Nógrád ===
Pos	Team	Pld	W	D	L	GF	GA	GD	Pts	Promotion or relegation
1	Karancslapujtő (C)	22	20	1	1	94	15	+79	61	Qualification for promotion play-offs
2	Vizslás	22	17	1	4	61	25	+36	52	
3	Mohora	22	14	1	7	58	30	+28	43	
4	Pásztó	22	13	2	7	62	33	+29	41	
5	Bánk-Dalnoki Akadémia (Note: 4 penalty point deducted from Bánk-Dalnoki Akadémia)	22	12	2	8	61	43	+18	34	
6	Szügy	22	10	3	9	43	40	+3	33	
7	Diósjenő	22	9	0	13	43	48	−5	27	
8	Bátonyterenye	22	7	5	10	23	40	−17	26	
9	Héhalom (Note: 1 penalty point deducted from Héhalom)	22	7	3	12	34	54	−20	23	
10	Berkenye	22	5	4	13	42	59	−17	19	
11	Szécsény	22	3	1	18	22	74	−52	10	
12	Balassagyarmat (R)	22	3	1	18	24	106	−82	10	Relegation to Megyei Bajnokság II
13	Szendehely (Note: Szendehely was eliminated) (E)	0	0	0	0	0	0	0	0	

Updated to match(es) played on 31 May 2025. Source: Hungarian Football Federation
(C) Champions; (E) Eliminated; (R) Relegated

=== Pest ===
Pos	Team	Pld	W	D	L	GF	GA	GD	Pts	Promotion or relegation
1	Gödöllő (C)	30	25	4	1	85	22	+63	79	Qualification for promotion play-offs
2	Dunavarsány	30	23	4	3	80	25	+55	73	
3	Pilis	30	22	2	6	74	26	+48	68	
4	Perbál (Note: 3 penalty point deducted from Perbál)	30	17	6	7	55	39	+16	54	
5	Cegléd	30	15	4	11	61	29	+32	49	
6	Biatorbágy	30	14	5	11	55	44	+11	47	
7	Cso-Ki Sport	30	13	8	9	55	46	+9	47	
8	Vecsés	30	13	6	11	54	34	+20	45	
9	Dunakeszi	30	13	5	12	66	57	+9	44	
10	Vác	30	13	3	14	81	52	+29	42	
11	Bugyi	30	11	8	11	44	38	+6	41	
12	Pomáz	30	11	1	18	41	63	−22	34	
13	Budakalász	30	5	6	19	29	65	−36	21	
14	Diósd (Note: 5 penalty point deducted from Diósd)	30	6	5	19	31	64	−33	18	
15	Nagykáta (R)	30	2	5	23	24	84	−60	11	Relegation to Megyei Bajnokság II
16	Örkény (R)	30	0	2	28	8	155	−147	2	Relegation to Megyei Bajnokság II

Updated to match(es) played on 31 May 2025. Source: Hungarian Football Federation
(C) Champions; (R) Relegated

=== Somogy ===
Pos	Team	Pld	W	D	L	GF	GA	GD	Pts	Promotion or relegation
1	Balatonlelle (C)	28	23	2	3	96	18	+78	71	Qualification for promotion play-offs
2	Nagyatád	28	21	4	3	83	21	+62	67	
3	Toponár	28	17	5	6	61	36	+25	56	
4	Juta	28	16	5	7	71	48	+23	53	
5	Nagybajom	28	16	4	8	74	37	+37	52	
6	Marcali	28	16	2	10	66	40	+26	50	
7	Somogysárd	28	15	2	11	64	47	+17	47	
8	Kadarkút	28	14	4	10	56	45	+11	46	
9	Kaposmérő	28	10	5	13	49	53	−4	35	
10	Balatoni Vasas	28	10	4	14	53	42	+11	34	
11	Csurgó	28	9	4	15	33	60	−27	31	
12	Barcs	28	9	1	18	48	76	−28	28	
13	Tab	28	5	2	21	30	87	−57	17	
14	Kaposfüred	28	3	2	23	22	108	−86	11	
15	Balatonkeresztúr (R)	28	3	0	25	25	113	−88	9	Relegation to Megyei Bajnokság II

Updated to match(es) played on 31 May 2025. Source: Hungarian Football Federation
(C) Champions; (R) Relegated

=== Szabolcs-Szatmár-Bereg ===
Pos	Team	Pld	W	D	L	GF	GA	GD	Pts	Promotion or relegation
1	Tarpa (C)	28	22	3	3	89	15	+74	69	Qualification for promotion play-offs
2	Újfehértó	28	15	8	5	72	53	+19	53	
3	Ibrány	28	15	7	6	58	38	+20	52	
4	Mándok	28	15	6	7	66	31	+35	51	
5	Csenger	28	14	6	8	66	59	+7	48	
6	Nagyecsed	28	12	7	9	47	33	+14	43	
7	Nyírmeggyes	28	12	7	9	59	48	+11	43	
8	Nyírbátor	28	11	7	10	59	44	+15	40	
9	Nagykálló	28	11	6	11	36	39	−3	39	
10	Agnis-Gergelyiugornya	28	10	4	14	35	63	−28	34	
11	Kótaj	28	8	7	13	37	53	−16	31	
12	Kemecse	28	6	6	16	32	66	−34	24	
13	Baktalórántháza	28	5	8	15	27	61	−34	23	
14	Austria J.-Vásárosnamény (R)	28	4	6	18	28	68	−40	18	Relegation to Megyei Bajnokság II
15	Nyírvasvári (R)	28	1	10	17	27	67	−40	13	Relegation to Megyei Bajnokság II

Updated to match(es) played on 31 May 2025. Source: Hungarian Football Federation
(C) Champions; (R) Relegated

=== Tolna ===
Pos	Team	Pld	W	D	L	GF	GA	GD	Pts	Promotion or relegation
1	Dombóvár (C)	24	22	2	0	101	19	+82	68	Qualification for promotion play-offs
2	Bölcske	24	15	1	8	77	30	+47	46	
3	Bátaszék	24	14	3	7	61	36	+25	45	
4	Kakasd	24	10	6	8	48	49	−1	36	
5	Bonyhád	24	8	1	15	37	79	−42	25	
6	Holler	24	5	3	16	41	79	−38	18	
7	Teveli Medosz (R)	24	1	2	21	28	101	−73	5	Relegation to Megyei Bajnokság II

Updated to match(es) played on 24 May 2025. Source: Hungarian Football Federation
(C) Champions; (R) Relegated

=== Vas ===
Pos	Team	Pld	W	D	L	GF	GA	GD	Pts	Promotion or relegation
1	ISA Haladás (C)	24	21	2	1	76	15	+61	65	Qualification for promotion play-offs
2	Sárvár	24	16	4	4	73	29	+44	52	
3	Király	24	15	4	5	76	27	+49	49	
4	Szentgotthárd	24	14	6	4	46	23	+23	48	
5	Söpte	24	11	8	5	46	25	+21	41	
6	Szarvaskend	24	12	2	10	52	36	+16	38	
7	Vép	24	8	7	9	47	49	−2	31	
8	Csákánydoroszló	24	8	3	13	39	69	−30	27	
9	Celldömölk	24	7	6	11	30	46	−16	27	
10	Körmend	24	5	5	14	31	61	−30	20	
11	Csepreg	24	5	3	16	15	36	−21	18	
12	Vasvár (R)	24	3	4	17	22	71	−49	13	Relegation to Megyei Bajnokság II
13	Rábapaty (R)	24	4	0	20	18	84	−66	12	Relegation to Megyei Bajnokság II

Updated to match(es) played on 31 May 2025. Source: Hungarian Football Federation
(C) Champions; (R) Relegated

=== Veszprém ===
Pos	Team	Pld	W	D	L	GF	GA	GD	Pts	Promotion or relegation
1	Pápa (C)	26	23	2	1	113	24	+89	71	Qualification for promotion play-offs
2	Úrkút	26	19	4	3	100	28	+72	61	
3	Balatonalmádi	26	19	3	4	78	27	+51	60	
4	Balatonfüredi USC	26	16	5	5	75	34	+41	53	
5	Zirc	26	14	4	8	46	42	+4	46	
6	Tihany	26	15	0	11	83	45	+38	45	
7	Ajka (Note: 4 penalty point deducted from Ajka)	26	13	3	10	46	34	+12	38	
8	Sümeg	26	10	4	12	51	51	0	34	
9	Csetény	26	10	3	13	48	60	−12	33	
10	Várpalota	26	8	3	15	50	72	−22	27	
11	Devecser (Note: 1 penalty point deducted from Devecser)	26	6	3	17	43	92	−49	20	
12	Szentantalfa	26	4	2	20	28	82	−54	14	
13	Pét	26	4	1	21	22	102	−80	13	
14	RAC (Veszprém)	26	2	1	23	23	113	−90	7	
15	Fűzfő (Note: Fűzfő was eliminated) (E)	0	0	0	0	0	0	0	0	Relegation to Megyei Bajnokság II

Updated to match(es) played on 31 May 2025. Source: Hungarian Football Federation
(C) Champions; (E) Eliminated

=== Zala ===
Pos	Team	Pld	W	D	L	GF	GA	GD	Pts	Promotion or relegation
1	Zalaegerszeg II (C)	26	22	1	3	100	11	+89	67	Qualification for promotion play-offs
2	Csesztreg	26	18	3	5	84	38	+46	57	
3	Szepetnek	26	16	4	6	51	37	+14	52	
4	Hévíz	26	16	2	8	62	29	+33	50	
5	Technoroll Teskánd	26	15	5	6	74	38	+36	50	
6	ZVFC Zalaszentgrót	26	13	6	7	55	39	+16	45	
7	Clean Medic Zalalövő (Note: 4 penalty point deducted from Clean Medic Zalalövő)	26	12	9	5	54	34	+20	41	
8	Magnetic Andráshida TE	26	11	2	13	48	42	+6	35	
9	Lenti	26	8	3	15	41	53	−12	27	
10	Semjénháza	26	7	5	14	23	61	−38	26	
11	Zalakomár-Zalakaros (Note: 1 penalty point deducted from Zalakomár-Zalakaros)	26	6	5	15	38	64	−26	22	
12	Kinizsi SK Gyenesdiás	26	5	6	15	32	105	−73	21	
13	Tarr Andráshida SC	26	4	3	19	49	101	−52	15	
14	Kiskanizsai Sáskák (R)	26	1	2	23	20	79	−59	5	Relegation to Megyei Bajnokság II

Updated to match(es) played on 31 May 2025. Source: Hungarian Football Federation
(C) Champions; (R) Relegated

== Promotion play-offs ==
Ten places are up for grabs in 2025–26 Nemzeti Bajnokság III, and eighteen regional I division champions were interested in the draw. Sixteen teams are playing in the Promotion play-offs, while two teams do not have to play, as they have already won the right to start in Nemzeti Bajnokság III as force winners. Luck favored the teams from Békéscsaba II and Zsámbék, as they were the ones who already advanced to the third division as force winners.

Location of Promotion play-offs teams in 2024–25 Megyei Bajnokság I

Team 1	Agg.	Team 2	1st leg	2nd leg
Dombóvár	1–3	Tarpa	0–3	1–0
Perutz	3–0	Törökszentmiklós	3–0	0–0
Karancslapujtő	4–2	ZTE II	2–0	2–2
Hajdúnánás	0–5	Ózd	0–3	0–2
Gödöllő	4–0	Mohács	1–0	3–0
Gyöngyös	1–10	Szeged II	0–3	1–7
Csepel UFC	2–3	Balatonlelle	2–1	0–2
Dunaújváros	4–2	Haladás	2–1	2–1

=== Dombóvár–Tarpa ===
8 June 2025 First leg	Dombóvár	0–3	Tarpa	Dombóvár
17:00 CEST		Report	Kuchynskyi 21'; Makshaiev 25'; Gál 29'	Stadium: Ujvári Kálmán Sporttelep; Referee: Péter Zierkelbach; Assistant referees: Gábor Máyer, András Perák

15 June 2025 Second leg	Tarpa	0–1 (3–1 agg.)	Dombóvár	Tarpa
17:00 CEST		Report	Lódri 71'	Stadium: Tarpa Sportcentrum; Referee: Tamás Takács; Assistant referees: Pál Vrbovszki, István László

=== Perutz–Törökszentmiklós ===
8 June 2025 First leg	Perutz	3–0	Törökszentmiklós	Pápa
16:00 CEST	K. Nagy 20' (pen.); D. Nagy 49' (pen.), 83'	Report		Stadium: Perutz Stadion; Referee: Ákos Gaál; Assistant referees: Dominik Dobos, Csaba Tóth

15 June 2025 Second leg	Törökszentmiklós	0–0 (0–3 agg.)	Perutz	Törökszentmiklós
16:00 CEST		Report		Stadium: Törökszentmiklósi FC Sporttelep; Referee: Tamás Tóth; Assistant referees: Márton Végh

=== Karancslapujtő–ZTE II ===
8 June 2025 First leg	Karancslapujtő	2–0	ZTE II	Karancslapujtő
16:00 CEST	Bonivárt 48'; Budveszel 57'	Report		Stadium: Karancslapujtői Sporttelep; Referee: Barnabás Drabon; Assistant referees: János Imrő ifj., Viktor Frank

15 June 2025 Second leg	ZTE II	2–2 (2–4 agg.)	Karancslapujtő	Zalaegerszeg
17:00 CEST	Molnár 64'; Király 67'	Report	Pál 57'; Budveszel 61'	Stadium: ZTE Training Center; Referee: Flórián Holczbauer; Assistant referees: Tamás Keszthelyi, Patrik Sáfárik

Note: On June 25, 2025, Karancslapujtő announced that despite winning NB III membership in the promotions play-off, they would not start competing in the third division in the 2025/26 season.

=== Hajdúnánás–Ózd ===
8 June 2025 First leg	Hajdúnánás FK	0–3	Ózd-Sajóvölgye FSE	Hajdúnánás
17:30 CEST		Report	Pataki 11'; Fercsák 45'; Szemere 60'	Stadium: Hajdúnánási Sporttelep; Referee: Attila Nagy; Assistant referees: Dávid Dobos, Norbert Szilágyi

15 June 2025 Second leg	Ózd	2–0 (5–0 agg.)	Hajdúnánás	Ózd
17:00 CEST	Horváth 2'; Komáromi 90'	Report		Stadium: Városi Stadion; Referee: Csaba Sándor; Assistant referees: Zsolt Szilágyi, Bálint Juhász

=== Gödöllő–Mohács ===
8 June 2025 First leg	Gödöllő	1–0	Mohács	Gödöllő
17:30 CEST	Koziorowski 24'	Report		Stadium: Szűcs Lajos Sportcentrum; Referee: Szabolcs Kakuk; Assistant referees: István László, Pál Vrbovszki

15 June 2025 Second leg	Mohács	0–3 (0–4 agg.)	Gödöllő	Mohács
17:00 CEST		Report	Koziorowski 26'; Mertse 79', 89'	Stadium: Újvárosi Stadion; Referee: János Dobai; Assistant referees: Richárd Szabó, Bence Balogh

=== Gyöngyös–Szeged II ===
8 June 2025 First leg	Gyöngyös	0–3	Szeged II	Gyöngyös
17:30 CEST		Report	D. Nagy 47', 69', 74'	Stadium: Kömley Károly Sporttelep; Referee: Tamás Ujhelyi; Assistant referees: Levente Balla, Balázs Elek

15 June 2025 Second leg	Szeged II	7–1 (10–1 agg.)	Gyöngyös	Szeged
17:00 CEST	Dudás 7'; Bakó 10'; Pataki 24', 41', 44'; Maronyai 34'; D. Nagy 64'	Report	Szentannai 82'	Stadium: Szent Gellért Fórum; Referee: Dávid Hajdú; Assistant referees: Dávid Dobos, Donát Pálinkás

=== Csepel–Balatonlelle ===
8 June 2025 First leg	Csepel UFC	2–1	Balatonlelle	Csepel
17:30 CEST	Pásztor 37'; Mészáros 90+2'	Report	Orsós 55'	Stadium: USE Sporttelep; Referee: Patrik Fehérvári; Assistant referees: Szabin Topálszki, Márk Nagy

15 June 2025 Second leg	Balatonlelle	2–0 (3–2 agg.)	Csepel UFC	Balatonlelle
17:00 CEST	Borbély 21'; Fazekas 39'	Report		Stadium: Balatonlelle Sporttelep; Referee: Ádám Papp; Assistant referees: Kristóf Halmai, Dominik Dobos

=== Dunaújváros–Haladás ===
8 June 2025 First leg	Dunaújváros	2–1	ISA Haladás	Dunaújváros
17:30 CEST	Szepessy 69'; Á. Tóth 79'	Report	Fehér 25'	Stadium: Dunaújvárosi Stadion; Referee: András Gáspár; Assistant referees: Tamás Keszthelyi, Tamás Vargha

15 June 2025 Second leg	ISA Haladás	1–2 (2–4 agg.)	Dunaújváros	Szombathely
17:00 CEST	Krone 74'	Report	Á. Tóth 9'; Gránicz 66'	Stadium: Illés Akadémia Sporttelep; Referee: Ákos Takács; Assistant referees: Richárd Urbán, Miklós Turi

== Season statistics ==
After the Regular season, the Promotion play-offs matches do not include.

=== Top goalscorers ===
Since the number of rounds in each county is not the same, the order is determined by the average number of goals.

As of match played 31 May 2025

Rank	Player	Club	County	Goals	Round	Average (Goals/Round)	Ref.
1	Ádám Czeglédi	Zsámbék	Komárom-Esztergom	37	24	1.54	
2	Bence Szita	Mohora	Nógrád	31	22	1.41	
3	Bence Reizinger	Sárbogárd	Fejér	36	26	1.38	
4	Krisztián Kollega	Juta	Somogy	36	28	1.28	
5	Krisztián Nagy	Perutz	Veszprém	32	26	1.23	
6	Imre Bajnók	Kenderes	Jász-Nagykun-Szolnok	36	30	1.20	
6	Gábor Ivacs	Harta	Bács-Kiskun	36	30	1.20	
6	Lajos Tóth	Hajdúszoboszló	Hajdú-Bihar	36	30	1.20	
9	Dávid Nagy	Ibrány	Szabolcs-Szatmár-Bereg	31	28	1.11	
10	Mátyás Simon	Lőrinci	Heves	33	30	1.10	
10	Zsolt Szabó	Koroncó	Győr-Moson-Sopron	33	30	1.10	
12	Roland Pataki	Ózd-Sajóvölgye	Borsod-Abaúj-Zemplén	28	26	1.07	
13	György Kamarás	Pilis	Pest	30	30	1.00	
14	Martin Őri	Csesztreg	Zala	25	26	0.96	
15	Máté Isaszegi	OMTK ULE 1913	Békés	19	22	0.86	
16	Bence Bunevácz	Dombóvár	Tolna	19	24	0.79	
16	Gergő Czöndör	Király SE	Vas	20	24	0.79	
18	Dáneil Udvardi	PTE PEAC II	Baranya	20	27	0.74	
19	Tamás Kulcsár	Unione FC	Budapest	21	30	0.70	
20	Ádám Molnár	Kiskundorozsma	Csongrád-Csanád	21	32	0.66	

== See also ==
- 2024–25 Magyar Kupa
- 2024–25 Nemzeti Bajnokság I
- 2024–25 Nemzeti Bajnokság II
- 2024–25 Nemzeti Bajnokság III
