= Bagi TC '96 =

Hungarian football club

- Full name: Bagi Torna Club '96
- Founded: 1926
- Website: bagitc.hupont.hu
Home colours

Bagi Torna Club '96 is a professional football club based in Bag, Pest County, Hungary.

== History ==
Bagi FC won the Mátra group of the 1990–91 Nemzeti Bajnokság III season, and gained promotion to the second division. The club spent two consecutive seasons in the second division until they were relegated.

== Name changes ==
- Bagi MOVE: ? – 1945
- Bagi MaDISz: 1945 – 1948
- 1948: merger with Bagi Barátság
- Bagi EPOSz: 1948 – 1950
- Bagi DISz: 1950 – 1951
- Bagi SK: 1951 – ?
- Bagi Vörös Csillag TSz SK: ? – ?
- Bagi Sportegyesület: ? – 1991
- Bagi FC: 1992 – ?
- Bagi TC' 96: ? –

== Honours ==
=== League ===
- Nemzeti Bajnokság III:
  - Winners (1): 1990–91

== Seasons ==
As of 16 October 2026.

Season	Tier	Club's name	Position	Pts
1941–42	5	Bagi MOVE SE	2 / 13	37
1942–43	5	Bagi MOVE	1 / 7	23
1943–44	4	Bagi MOVE	4 / 12	27
1944–45	3	Bagi MOVE	0 / 12	
1946–47	5	Bagi MaDISz	1 / 11	
1947–48	4	Bagi MaDISz	0 / 14	
1948–49	4	Bagi EPOSz	12 / 16	24
1949–50	5	Bagi EPOSz	3 / 13	34
1950	5	Bagi DISz	7 / 12	11
1951	4	Bag	0 / 8	
1952	4	Bagi SK	1 / 14	
1953	3	Bagi SK	6 / 16	33
1954	3	Bagi SK	10 / 16	27
1955	4	Bagi Vörös Meteor	2 / 14	35
1956	4	Bag	0 / 9	
1957	4	Bag	6 / 10	14
1957–58	5	Bag	5 / 16	39
1958–59	5	Bag	3 / 8	19
1959–60	5	Bag	3 / 8	15
1960–61	5	Bag	1 / 10	30
1961–62	4	Bag	6 / 17	33
1962–63	4	Bag	12 / 16	26
1963	5	Bagi TSz SK	2 / 16	21
1964	5	Bag	2 / 16	44
1965	5	Bagi Vörös Csillag TSz SE	3 / 16	37
1966	5	Bagi Vörös Csillag Tsz SK	1 / 16	39
1967	4	Bagi TSz SK	12 / 16	29
1968	4	Bagi TSZ SK	4 / 16	35
1969	4	Bagi TSZ SK	16 / 16	10
1970	5	Bagi TSz SK	7 / 8	10
1970–71	5	Bagi TSz SK	15 / 16	24
1971–72	6	Bag	2 / 16	38
1972–73	6	Bag	3 / 16	35
1973–74	6	Bag	1 / 16	39
1974–75	5	Bag	10 / 14	26
1975–76	5	Bag	4 / 14	32
1976–77	5	Bag	12 / 14	17
1977–78	6	Bag	1 / 8	44
1978–79	4	Bag	8 / 14	28
1979–80	4	Bag	9 / 18	29
1980–81	4	Bag	3 / 17	45
1981–82	5	Bag	4 / 14	33
1982–83	5	Bagi KSK	1 / 14	41
1983–84	4	Bagi TSz SK	5 / 16	35
1984–85	4	Bagi TSz SK	6 / 16	35
1985–86	4	Bag	10 / 16	28
1986–87	4	Bag	5 / 16	33
1987–88	4	Bag	2 / 16	43
1988–89	3	Bagi SE	11 / 16	40
1989–90	3	Bagi SE	6 / 16	46
1990–91	3	Bagi SE	1 / 16	45
1991–92	2	Bagi FC	8 / 16	30
1992–93	2	Bagi FC	16 / 16	17
1993–94	3	Bagi FC	15 / 16	21
1994–95	4	Bagi FC	16 / 16	19
1996–97	6	Bag	1 / 10	47
1997–98	6	Bag	8 / 16	38
1998–99	6	Bag	1 / 16	75
1999–00	5	Bag	5 / 18	54
2000–01	5	Bag	3 / 18	81
2001–02	5	Bag	2 / 16	65
2002–03	5	Bag	2 / 16	66
2003–04	5	Bag	2 / 16	68
2004–05	5	Bag	2 / 16	75
2005–06	4	Bagi TC '96	4 / 16	57
2006–07	4	Bagi TC '96	2 / 16	65
2007–08	4	Bagi TC '96	6 / 16	50
2008–09	4	Bagi TC '96	12 / 16	35
2009–10	4	Bag TC '96	8 / 16	38
2010–11	4	Bag TC '96	9 / 16	43
2011–12	4	Bagi TC '96	7 / 16	39
2012–13	5	Bag TC '96	2 / 16	68
2013–14	5	Bagi TC '96	3 / 15	56
2014–15	5	Bagi TC '96	8 / 15	45
2015–16	5	Bagi TC '96	1 / 16	74
2016–17	5	Bagi TC '96	5 / 16	41
2017–18	5	Bagi TC '96	4 / 16	54
2018–19	5	Bagi TC '96	6 / 16	44
2019–20	5	Bagi TC '96	7 / 16	20
2020–21	5	Bagi TC '96	10 / 16	36
2021–22	5	Bagi TC '96	9 / 16	36
2022–23	5	Bagi TC '96	9 / 16	40
2023–24	5	Bagi TC '96	10 / 16	32
2024–25	5	Bagi TC '96	12 / 16	31
2025–26	5	Bagi TC '96	13 / 16	26
