= Hajdúnánás FK =

Hungarian football club

Hajdúnánás Futball Klub
- Full name: Hajdúnánás Futball Klub
- Founded: 1946
- Website: https://nanasfk.hu/
Home colours

Hajdúnánás Futball Klub is a professional football club based in Hajdúnánás, Hajdú–Bihar County, Hungary.

== History ==
Hajdúnánás FK won the Tisza group of the 1990–91 Nemzeti Bajnokság III season, as Hajdúnánási Bocskai SE, and gained promotion to the second division.

Ferenc Vígh was appointed as the sports leader.

== Name changes ==
- Hajdúnánási TK: 1946 – 1948
- Hajdúnánási DTE: 1948 – 1949
- Hajdúnánási EPOSz: 1949 – 1950
- Hajdúnánási ÉDOSz: 1950 – 1951
- Hajdúnánási Kinizsi: 1951 – 1953
- Hajdúnánási Traktor: 1953 – 1957
- Hajdúnánási Bocskai: 1957 – 1958
- Hajdúnánási Spartacus: 1958 – 1967 ősz
- Hajdúnánási Szellőző Vasas SE: 1967 ősz – 1974
- Hajdúnánási SC: 1974 – 1979
- 1979: merger with Hajdúnánási Dózsa TSz SK
- Hajdúnánási Dózsa TSz SE: 1980 – ?
- Hajdúnánási Bocskai SE: 1983 – ?
- FK Hajdúnánás-Tedej: ? – 1998
- FK Hajdúnánás-Nánás Gabona: 1998 – ?
- Hajdúnánási Futball Klub: ? – 2008
- Hajdúnánás Góliát Bútor FK: 2008.07.?? – ?
- Hajdúnánás-Flexo 2000 FK: ? – 2022
- Hajdúnánás Futball Klub: 2022 – present

== Honours ==
=== League ===
- Nemzeti Bajnokság III:
  - Winners (1): 1990–91

== Seasons ==
The table below shows the seasons of Hajdúnánás FK.

As of 27 October 2026.

Season	Tier	Club's name	Position	Pts
1946–47	4	Hajdúnánási TK	0 / 7	
1947–48	4	Hajdúnánási TK	5 / 12	25
1948–49	4	Hajdúnánási DTE	1 / 16	43
1949–50	3	Hajdúnánási EPOSz	11 / 16	26
1950	3	Hajdúnánási ÉDOSz	16 / 17	3
1951	3	Hajdúnánási Kinizsi	7 / 14	28
1952	3	Hajdúnánási Kinizsi	7 / 14	26
1953	3	Hajdúnánási Traktor	3 / 12	31
1954	3	Hajdúnánási Traktor	14 / 16	18
1955	4	Hajdúnánási Traktor	1 / 10	31
1956	3	Hajdúnánási Traktor	11 / 16	28
1957	3	Hajdúnánási Bocskai	5 / 6	5
1957–58	4	Hajdúnánási Bocskai	10 / 17	32
1958–59	4	Hajdúnánási Spartacus	4 / 16	37
1959–60	4	Hajdúnánási Spartacus	4 / 17	37
1960–61	4	Hajdúnánási Spartacus	4 / 18	42
1961–62	4	Hajdúnánási Spartacus	3 / 18	39
1962–63	4	Hajdúnánási Spartacus	7 / 18	32
1963	5	Hajdúnánási Spartacus	11 / 18	15
1964	5	Hajdúnánási Spartacus	10 / 16	26
1965	5	Hajdúnánási Spartacus	10 / 16	27
1966	5	Hajdúnánási Spartacus	11 / 19	26
1967	5	Hajdúnánási Szellőző	9 / 16	27
1968	5	Hajdúnánási Szellőző	15 / 16	18
1969	6	Hajdúnánási Szellőző	2 / 9	24
1970	6	Hajdúnánás	4 / 8	15
1970–71	6	Hajdúnánási Szellőző	1 / 18	49
1971–72	5	Hajdúnánási Szellőző	7 / 16	34
1972–73	5	Hajdúnánási Szellőző	15 / 16	17
1973–74	5	Hajdúnánási SC	13 / 16	16
1974–75	4	Hajdúnánási SC	9 / 16	25
1975–76	4	Hajdúnánási SC	6 / 17	37
1976–77	4	Hajdúnánási SC	7 / 18	34
1977–78	4	Hajdúnánási SC	11 / 18	31
1978–79	3	Hajdúnánási SC	11 / 18	33
1979–80	3	Hajdúnánási SC	10 / 18	30
1980–81	3	Hajdúnánási Dózsa TSz SE	12 / 18	25
1981–82	4	Hajdúnánási Dózsa TSz SE	5 / 16	35
1982–83	4	Hajdúnánási Dózsa TSZ SE	9 / 16	29
1983–84	4	Hajdúnánási Bocskai SE	11 / 16	28
1984–85	4	Hajdúnánási Bocskai SE	14 / 16	21
1985–86	4	Hajdúnánási Bocskai SE	12 / 16	23
1986–87	4	Hajdúnánási Bocskai SE	3 / 16	38
1987–88	4	Hajdúnánási Bocskai SE	1 / 16	44
1988–89	3	Hajdúnánási Bocskai SE	10 / 16	44
1989–90	3	Hajdúnánási Bocskai SE	13 / 16	34
1990–91	3	Hajdúnánási Bocskai SE	1 / 16	42
1991–92	2	Hajdúnánási FC	13 / 16	24
1992–93	2	Hajdúnánási FC	11 / 16	29
1993–94	2	Hajdúnánási FC	9 / 16	31
1994–95	2	Hajdúnánási FC	11 / 16	38
1995–96	2	Hajdúnánási FC	9 / 16	42
1996–97	2	Hajdúnánási FC-Tedej	13 / 16	23
1997–98	3	Hajdúnánás	16 / 16	21
1998–99	4	FK Hajdúnánás-Nánás Gabona	15 / 16	26
1999–2000	4	Hajdúnánás	9 / 16	49
2000	3	Hajdúnánás	3 / 8	25
2000–01	4	Hajdúnánás	3 / 11	39
2001–02	4	FK Hajdúnánás-Stadimix FC	13 / 14	26
2002–03	4	Hajdúnánás	15 / 16	31
2003–04	4	Hajdúnánás	8 / 15	33
2004–05	4	Hajdúnánás	6 / 15	44
2005–06	3	Hajdúnánás FK	7 / 16	45
2006–07	3	Hajdúnánás FK	8 / 14	34
2007–08	3	Hajdúnánás FK	14 / 16	26
2008–09	4	Hajdúnánás Góliát Bútor FK	14 / 18	34
2009–10	4	Hajdúnánás Góliát Bútor FK	14 / 16	30
2010–11	4	Hajdúnánás GB FK	11 / 16	34
2011–12	4	Hajdúnánás Góliát Bútor FK	8 / 16	41
2012–13	4	Hajdúnánás Goliát Bútor FK	3 / 16	51
2013–14	4	Hajdúnánás GB. FK	9 / 16	41
2014–15	4	Hajdúnánás-Flexo 2000 FK	6 / 16	40
2015–16	4	Hajdúnánás GB. FK	4 / 16	56
2016–17	4	Hajdúnánás GB. FK	5 / 16	51
2017–18	4	Hajdúnánás-Flexo 2000 FK	4 / 16	63
2018–19	4	Hajdúnánás-Flexo 2000 FK	5 / 16	51
2019–20	4	Hajdúnánás-Flexo 2000 FK	9 / 16	26
2020–21	4	Hajdúnánás-Flexo 2000 FK	11 / 16	39
2021–22	4	Hajdúnánás-Flexo 2000 FK	8 / 16	43
2022–23	4	Hajdúnánás FK	3 / 16	65
2023–24	4	Hajdúnánás FK	4 / 14	54
2024–25	4	Hajdúnánás FK	1 / 16	73
2025–26	4	Hajdúnánás FK	1 / 16	83
