= 2005–06 Nemzeti Bajnokság III =

Nemzeti Bajnokság III
- Season: 2005–06
- Champions: Békéscsaba 1912 Előre (Alföld); Elekthermax Vasas SE (Bakony); Szentlõrinc-Ormánság Takarékszövetkezet SE (Dráva); Budaörsi SC (Duna); Jászberényi SE (Mátra); Tuzsér Erdért SE (Tisza)
- Promoted: Békéscsaba 1912 Előre (Alföld); ~~Elekthermax Vasas SE~~ (Bakony); Szentlõrinc-Ormánság Takarékszövetkezet SE (Dráva); Budaörsi SC (Duna); Jászberényi SE (Mátra); Tuzsér Erdért SE (Tisza)

The 2005–06 Nemzeti Bajnokság III season was the 24th edition of the Nemzeti Bajnokság III.

== League table ==
=== Alföld group ===
Pos	Team	Pld	W	D	L	GF	GA	GD	Pts	Promotion or relegation
1	Békéscsabai 1912 Előre SE	28	18	6	4	52	20	+32	60	Promotion to Nemzeti Bajnokság II
2	Algyő SK	28	16	4	8	47	31	+16	52	
3	Szolnoki Spartacus-Rákóczifalva SE	28	14	6	8	57	40	+17	48	
4	Kiskunhalas	28	14	5	9	47	34	+13	47	Relegation to Megyei Bajnokság I
5	Monori SE	28	13	7	8	45	34	+11	46	
6	Túrkeve-Veteriner	28	12	6	10	35	33	+2	42	
7	Gyulai Termál FC	28	13	2	13	43	46	−3	41	
8	FC Dabas	28	12	4	12	54	47	+7	40	
9	Hódmezővásárhely FC	28	12	4	12	36	42	−6	40	
10	Ceglédi VSE	28	10	8	10	38	36	+2	38	
11	MAFC Mezőtúr	28	10	4	14	42	51	−9	34	
12	Örkény SE	28	9	6	13	28	39	−11	33	
13	Szarvasi FC	28	8	5	15	39	62	−23	29	
14	Tápiógyörgye	28	6	6	16	34	55	−21	24	Relegation to Megyei Bajnokság I
15	KÖVITE-Plusz Sarkadkeresztúr	28	4	5	19	28	55	−27	17	Relegation to Megyei Bajnokság I

=== Bakony group ===
Pos	Team	Pld	W	D	L	GF	GA	GD	Pts	Promotion or relegation
1	Elekthermax Vasas SE (Pápa)	30	17	8	5	42	21	+21	59	Promotion to Nemzeti Bajnokság II
2	Sárvári FC	30	17	6	7	53	27	+26	57	
3	Fermat-Csesztreg	30	17	5	8	54	28	+26	56	
4	Csornai SE	30	15	6	9	56	37	+19	51	
5	Répcelaki SE	30	12	13	5	55	32	+23	49	
6	FC Keszthely	30	15	4	11	46	33	+13	49	
7	Büki TK	30	13	9	8	41	33	+8	48	
8	Marcali VFC	30	11	11	8	33	27	+6	44	
9	Andráshida SC	30	10	13	7	32	23	+9	43	
10	Sümegi VSE	30	9	11	10	32	32	0	28	
11	Soproni VSE-GYSEV	30	11	4	15	34	32	+2	37	
12	Balatonfüredi FC	30	9	8	13	54	62	−8	35	Relegation to Megyei Bajnokság I
13	TIAC-Honvéd VSE	30	9	6	15	26	44	−18	33	
14	Kapuvári SE	30	8	7	15	30	42	−12	31	Relegation to Megyei Bajnokság I
15	Jánossomorja	30	5	5	20	31	58	−27	20	Relegation to Megyei Bajnokság I
16	Ikarus-Maroshegy-Dunafém SE	30	2	4	24	25	113	−88	10	Relegation to Megyei Bajnokság I

=== Dráva group ===
Pos	Team	Pld	W	D	L	GF	GA	GD	Pts	Promotion or relegation
1	Szentlõrinc-Ormánság Takarékszövetkezet SE	30	22	8	0	73	16	+57	74	Promotion to Nemzeti Bajnokság II
2	Komlói Bányász SK	30	18	8	4	63	23	+40	62	
3	Tamási SE	30	18	3	9	66	44	+22	57	
4	Bonyhád VLC	30	15	9	6	44	27	+17	54	
5	Dombóvári FC-Rutin	30	14	11	5	50	34	+16	53	
6	Mohács TE	30	13	4	13	42	48	−6	43	
7	Kozármisleny SE	30	12	6	12	49	49	0	42	
8	Nagyatádi VSE	30	11	7	12	50	46	+4	40	
9	Bólyi SE	30	10	6	14	30	40	−10	36	
10	Beremendi Építők SK	30	10	4	16	28	41	−13	34	
11	Balatonboglári SC	30	8	9	13	36	47	−11	33	
12	Bajai LSE	30	10	2	18	43	63	−20	32	
13	Pécsi VSK	30	9	4	17	40	61	−21	31	
14	Siklós FC	30	7	6	17	32	56	−24	27	
15	Szekszárdi UFC	30	6	8	16	31	53	−22	26	Relegation to Megyei Bajnokság I
16	Dunaszentgyörgy SE	30	5	9	16	34	63	−29	24	Relegation to Megyei Bajnokság I

=== Duna group ===
Pos	Team	Pld	W	D	L	GF	GA	GD	Pts	Promotion or relegation
1	Budaörs SC	34	24	4	6	87	35	+52	76	Promotion to Nemzeti Bajnokság II
2	Százhalombattai LK	34	24	3	7	99	45	+54	75	
3	Móri SE	34	21	4	9	72	44	+28	67	
4	Tököl KSK	34	17	10	7	67	41	+26	61	
5	Dunakeszi Vasutas SE	34	16	10	8	64	36	+28	58	
6	Pénzügyőr SE	34	18	4	12	67	53	+14	58	
7	Taksony SE	34	17	7	10	81	82	−1	58	
8	III. Kerületi TUE	34	16	5	13	66	50	+16	53	
9	Enyingi VSE	34	17	3	14	53	50	+3	53 (Note: 1 point deducted)	
10	Budapesti Erőmű SE	34	13	7	14	59	58	+1	46	
11	Fóti SE	34	11	8	15	52	64	−12	41	Relegation to Megyei Bajnokság I
12	Szigetszentmiklósi TK	34	10	8	16	50	57	−7	38	
13	Rákosszentmihályi AFC	34	10	8	16	41	59	−18	38	
14	Rákosmenti Rojik FC	34	7	8	19	43	77	−34	29	Relegation to Megyei Bajnokság I
15	Dorogi FC	34	7	7	20	46	89	−43	28	Relegation to Megyei Bajnokság I
16	Szomor-Zsámbék FC	34	8	3	23	41	64	−23	27	Relegation to Megyei Bajnokság I
17	Bábolna SE	34	9	7	18	50	76	−26	23 (Note: 11 points deducted)	Relegation to Megyei Bajnokság I
18	Rákosmenti TK	34	5	6	23	34	92	−58	21	Relegation to Megyei Bajnokság I

=== Mátra group ===
Pos	Team	Pld	W	D	L	GF	GA	GD	Pts	Promotion or relegation
1	Jászberényi SE	30	19	9	2	73	29	+44	66	Promotion to Nemzeti Bajnokság II
2	Magyargéc SE 1	30	17	5	8	59	36	+23	56	
3	Tura VSK	30	16	6	8	72	22	+50	54	
4	Veresegyház VSK	30	15	9	6	58	32	+26	54	
5	Mezőkövesdi SE	30	15	7	8	58	37	+21	52	
6	Putnoki VFC	30	15	7	8	58	37	+21	52	
7	Gyöngyösi AK	30	15	6	9	51	35	+16	51	
8	Szőlőskert-Nagyréde SC	30	14	6	10	45	43	+2	48	
10	Nógrád Volán-Baglyasalja SE	30	12	7	11	54	43	+11	43	
10	Ózdi FC	30	13	4	13	49	52	−3	43	
11	Kisbágyon-Karton SE	30	9	8	13	39	56	−17	35	Relegation to Megyei Bajnokság I
12	Kistarcsai PFK	30	8	9	13	48	59	−11	33	Relegation to Megyei Bajnokság I
13	Gyöngyöshalász SE	30	7	5	18	30	56	−26	26	Relegation to Megyei Bajnokság I
14	Nagykáta SE	30	6	5	19	42	97	−55	23	Relegation to Megyei Bajnokság I
15	Salgótarjáni BTC	30	4	5	21	20	70	−50	17	Relegation to Megyei Bajnokság I
16	Pelikán FC-Gödöllő	30	4	4	22	29	81	−52	16	Relegation to Megyei Bajnokság I

=== Tisza group ===
Pos	Team	Pld	W	D	L	GF	GA	GD	Pts	Promotion or relegation
1	Tuzsér Erdért SE	30	22	3	5	83	25	+58	69	Promotion to Nemzeti Bajnokság II
2	Létavértes SC '97	30	21	4	5	69	15	+54	67	
3	Rakamazi Spartacus SE	30	20	5	5	78	34	+44	65	
4	Balkányi SE	30	19	7	4	70	29	+41	64	
5	Ibrány VSE	30	17	5	8	61	34	+27	56	
6	Volán-Sényő FC	30	15	5	10	58	41	+17	50	
7	Hajdúnánás FK	30	13	6	11	39	33	+6	45	
8	Hajdúböszörményi TE	30	12	5	13	53	47	+6	41	
9	Berettyóújfalui SE	30	11	8	11	58	58	0	41	
10	Balmazújvárosi FC	30	12	1	17	41	62	−21	37	
11	Nyíradonyi VVTK	30	9	7	14	47	53	−6	34	
12	Mátészalka FC	30	9	7	14	36	59	−23	34	
13	Mádi FC	30	9	4	17	33	59	−26	31	Relegation to Megyei Bajnokság I
14	Sátoraljaújhelyi TKSE	30	8	1	21	53	98	−45	25	
15	Szirmabesenyői SK	30	3	4	23	33	101	−68	13	Relegation to Megyei Bajnokság I
16	II. Rákóczi Ferenc SE Szakoly	30	2	4	24	35	99	−64	10	Relegation to Megyei Bajnokság I

== See also ==
- 2005–06 Magyar Kupa
- 2005–06 Nemzeti Bajnokság I
- 2005–06 Nemzeti Bajnokság II
