= 2010–11 Nemzeti Bajnokság III =

Nemzeti Bajnokság III
- Season: 2010–11
- Champions: Tököl VSK (Alföld); Soproni VSE (Bakony); Paksi FC II (Dráva); Dunaújváros PASE (Duna); Egri FC (Mátra); Nagyecsed Rákóczi SE (Tisza)
- Promoted: Soproni VSE (Bakony); Paksi FC II II (Dráva); Dunaújváros PASE II (Duna); Egri FC (Mátra)

The 2010–11 Nemzeti Bajnokság III season was the 30th edition of the Nemzeti Bajnokság III.

== League tables ==
=== Alföld group ===
Pos	Team	Pld	W	D	L	GF	GA	GD	Pts	Relegation
1	Tököl VSK	28	16	8	4	52	23	+29	56	
2	KITE-Szeged	28	17	4	7	57	26	+31	55	
3	Újbuda TC	28	16	5	7	56	35	+21	53	
4	Várfürdő-Gyulai Termál FC	28	15	7	6	48	27	+21	52	
5	Szolnoki MÁV FC II	28	14	7	7	51	30	+21	49	
6	Csepel FC	28	13	8	7	55	32	+23	47	
7	FC Dabas	28	11	12	5	44	28	+16	45	
8	Tisza Volán SC	28	11	9	8	40	35	+5	42	
9	Kecskeméti TE II	28	11	7	10	53	43	+10	40	
10	Hódmezővásárhelyi FC	28	11	6	11	46	37	+9	39	
11	Jánoshidai SE	28	8	1	19	40	80	−40	23 (Note: 2 points deducted)	
12	Szarvasi FC	28	6	5	17	43	72	−29	23	
13	Szolnoki Spartacus	28	6	4	18	42	75	−33	21 (Note: 1 point deducted)	Relegation to Megyei Bajnokság I
14	Szabadkígyósi SzSC	28	3	7	18	28	75	−47	16	Relegation to Megyei Bajnokság I
15	Jász Sport FC	28	4	6	18	28	65	−37	18 (Note: withdrew and excluded)	Relegation to Megyei Bajnokság I

=== Bakony group ===
Pos	Team	Pld	W	D	L	GF	GA	GD	Pts	Promotion or relegation
1	Soproni Vasutas SE	30	22	5	3	80	19	+61	71	Promotion to Nemzeti Bajnokság II
2	Lombard Pápa Termál FC II	30	19	8	3	58	21	+37	65	
3	Hévíz FC	30	19	6	5	55	22	+33	63	
4	Mosonmagyaróvári TE 1904	30	15	8	7	51	45	+6	53	
5	Szombathelyi Haladás II	30	15	7	8	63	24	+39	52	
6	Balatonfüredi FC	30	14	8	8	42	21	+21	50	
7	Sárvári FC	30	14	6	10	47	36	+11	48	
8	Zalaegerszegi TE FC II	30	13	6	11	52	43	+9	45	
9	Csornai SE	30	11	4	15	37	49	−12	37	
10	Lipót SE-Pékség	30	9	7	14	39	45	−6	34	Relegation to Megyei Bajnokság I
11	Répcelak SE	30	9	7	14	41	50	−9	34	
12	Büki TK	30	9	5	16	24	41	−17	32	Relegation to Megyei Bajnokság I
13	Badacsonytomaj-Tapolca FC	30	8	8	14	42	62	−20	32	
14	Celldömölki VSE	30	8	7	15	41	52	−11	31	Relegation to Megyei Bajnokság I
15	Várpalotai BSK	30	3	5	22	23	71	−48	14	
16	Kőszegi SK	30	3	1	26	21	115	−94	10	Relegation to Megyei Bajnokság I

=== Dráva group ===
Pos	Team	Pld	W	D	L	GF	GA	GD	Pts	Promotion or relegation
1	Paksi FC II	30	24	3	3	82	21	+61	75	Promotion to Nemzeti Bajnokság II
2	Szentlőrinc SE	30	21	4	5	72	23	+49	67	
3	Kaposvári Rákóczi FC II	30	15	5	10	49	33	+16	50	
4	Balatonlelle SE	30	15	5	10	38	40	−2	50	
5	Nagyatádi FC	30	13	9	8	49	35	+14	48	
6	Dombóvári FC-Rutin	30	12	8	10	45	44	+1	44	
7	Nagykanizsai TE 1866-Horváth Méh	30	13	3	14	48	40	+8	42	
8	Bölcskei SE	30	12	5	13	54	55	−1	41	
9	BFC Siófok II	30	12	5	13	43	53	−10	41	
10	Tolle UFC Szekszárd	30	11	7	12	36	44	−8	40	
11	Bonyhád VLC	30	12	3	15	35	43	−8	39	
12	Pogány-PMFC	30	9	7	14	45	60	−15	34	Relegation to Megyei Bajnokság I
13	Bólyi SE	30	10	3	17	41	55	−14	33	Relegation to Megyei Bajnokság I
14	Bogád SE	30	7	6	17	41	69	−28	27	Relegation to Megyei Bajnokság I
15	Mohácsi TE	30	6	6	18	38	67	−29	24	
16	Komlói Bányász SK	30	5	7	18	32	66	−34	22	

=== Duna group ===
Pos	Team	Pld	W	D	L	GF	GA	GD	Pts	Promotion or relegation
1	Dunaújváros-Pálhalmai Agrospeciál SE	30	18	7	5	46	21	+25	61	Promotion to Nemzeti Bajnokság II
2	Maglódi TC	30	16	6	8	46	31	+15	54	
3	Dunaharaszti MTK	30	13	11	6	46	30	+16	50	
4	Erzsébeti SMTK LE	30	14	5	11	53	38	+15	47	
5	Bicskei TC	30	13	7	10	50	41	+9	46	
6	Törökbálinti TC	30	12	9	9	43	46	−3	45	
7	Pénzügyőr SE	30	11	11	8	49	44	+5	44	
8	Móri SE	30	9	16	5	45	32	+13	43	
9	Százhalombattai LK	30	11	9	10	54	55	−1	42	
10	Érdi VSE	30	10	12	8	47	42	+5	42	
11	Soroksár SC	30	10	8	12	35	38	−3	38	
12	Viadukt SE Biatorbágy	30	10	7	13	33	42	−9	37	
13	Budafoki LC	30	8	10	12	33	48	−15	34	
14	Sárisápi Bányász SE (Note: the rights were transferred to Tatabányai ASK, and the club played in Megyei Bajnsokág III)	30	9	4	17	41	56	−15	31	Relegation to Megyei Bajnokság I
15	Dorogi FC	30	6	6	18	33	58	−25	24	
16	Zsámbéki SK	30	3	6	21	22	54	−32	15	Relegation to Megyei Bajnokság I

=== Mátra group ===
Pos	Team	Pld	W	D	L	GF	GA	GD	Pts	Promotion or relegation
1	Egri FC	30	24	4	2	85	32	+53	76	Promotion to Nemzeti Bajnokság II
2	Balmazújvárosi FC (Note: Balmazújváros qualified for the Nemzeti Bajnokság II thanks to the rights of Bőcs Sport)	30	19	4	7	74	29	+45	61	Relegation to Megyei Bajnokság I
3	Vasas SC II	30	18	4	8	66	37	+29	58	
4	FC Tiszaújváros	30	17	7	6	64	35	+29	58	
5	Putnok VSE	30	15	8	7	52	37	+15	53	
6	Rákosmenti KSK-Rojik	30	12	6	12	38	38	0	42	
7	Salgótarjáni BTC	30	10	10	10	43	39	+4	40	
8	Tura VSK-BioTech USA	30	11	5	14	45	52	−7	38	
9	Gyöngyösi AK-Ytong	30	10	8	12	42	44	−2	38	
10	Monori SE	30	9	9	12	39	44	−5	36	
11	Felsőtárkány SC	30	8	8	14	38	50	−12	32	
12	Hevesi LSC	30	10	4	16	46	60	−14	31 (Note: 3 points deducted)	Relegation to Megyei Bajnokság I
13	Ózdi FC	30	8	6	16	45	70	−25	30	
14	Dunakeszi Vasutas SE	30	7	8	15	40	69	−29	29	
15	Balassagyarmati VSE	30	6	6	18	20	55	−35	24	
16	Rákosszentmihályi AFC	30	5	5	20	30	76	−46	20	

=== Tisza group ===
Pos	Team	Pld	W	D	L	GF	GA	GD	Pts	Relegation
1	Nagyecsed Rákóczi SE	30	19	7	4	71	31	+40	64	
2	Cigánd SE	30	19	5	6	66	34	+32	62	
3	Tiszakanyár SE	30	19	4	7	77	40	+37	61	
4	Kemecse SE	30	18	4	8	74	38	+36	58	
5	Újfehértó SE-Nagykálló	30	15	13	2	55	25	+30	58	Relegation to Megyei Bajnokság I
6	Baktalórántháza VSE	30	16	5	9	60	39	+21	53	
7	Kótaj SE	30	12	6	12	39	48	−9	42	
8	Püspökladányi LE	30	14	4	12	53	38	+15	40 (Note: 6 points deducted)	Relegation to Megyei Bajnokság I
9	Tuzsér SE	30	12	4	14	42	58	−16	40	
10	Létavértes SC '97	30	10	8	12	47	40	+7	38	
11	Hajdúszoboszlói SE	30	10	8	12	34	38	−4	38	
12	Ibrány SE	30	10	6	14	34	45	−11	36	
13	Tiszalöki VSE	30	8	6	16	34	49	−15	30	
14	Nyírmadai ISE	30	5	5	20	35	87	−52	20	Relegation to Megyei Bajnokság I
15	Balkányi SE	30	4	4	22	26	77	−51	16	Relegation to Megyei Bajnokság I
16	Berettyóújfalui SE	30	4	1	25	15	75	−60	13	Relegation to Megyei Bajnokság I

== See also ==
- 2010–11 Magyar Kupa
- 2010–11 Nemzeti Bajnokság I
- 2010–11 Nemzeti Bajnokság II
