= 2007–08 Nemzeti Bajnokság III =

Nemzeti Bajnokság III
- Season: 2007–08
- Champions: Békéscsaba 1912 Előre (Alföld); Zalaegerszegi TE FC II (Bakony); Szentlőrinc SE (Dráva); Százhalombattai LK (Duna); MTK Budapest FC II (Mátra); Debreceni VSC-DEAC (Tisza)
- Promoted: Békéscsaba 1912 Előre (Alföld); Bajai LSE (Alföld); Zalaegerszegi TE FC II (Bakony); Győri ETO FC II (Bakony); Százhalombattai LK (Duna); MTK Budapest FC II (Mátra); Debreceni VSC-DEAC (Tisza)

The 2007–08 Nemzeti Bajnokság III season was the 27th edition of the Nemzeti Bajnokság III.

== League table ==
=== Alföld group ===
Pos	Team	Pld	W	D	L	GF	GA	GD	Pts	Promotion or relegation
1	Békéscsaba 1912 Előre SE	30	19	6	5	80	31	+49	63	Promotion to Nemzeti Bajnokság II
2	Bajai LSE	30	19	2	9	71	46	+25	59	Promotion to Nemzeti Bajnokság II
3	Szigetszentmiklósi TK	30	17	3	10	60	38	+22	54	
4	Monori SE	30	16	6	8	60	42	+18	54	
5	Budapest Honvéd FC II	30	15	7	8	75	38	+37	52	
6	Gyulai Termál FC	30	14	9	7	46	41	+5	51	
7	Tisza Volán SC	30	15	5	10	76	54	+22	50	
8	FC Dabas	30	13	4	13	60	41	+19	43	
9	Vasas SC II	30	12	5	13	43	42	+1	41	
10	Algyő SK	30	11	6	13	35	46	−11	39	
11	Hódmezővásárhely FC	30	11	5	14	44	58	−14	38	
12	Szolnoki Spartacus	30	11	4	15	42	56	−14	37	
13	Kiskunfélegyházi Honvéd TK	30	9	8	13	40	63	−23	35	
14	Rákospalotai EAC II	30	5	7	18	38	94	−56	22	Relegation to Megyei Bajnokság I
15	Csongrád TSE	30	5	6	19	31	63	−32	21	Relegation to Megyei Bajnokság I
16	Örkény SE	30	4	5	21	38	86	−48	17	Relegation to Megyei Bajnokság I

=== Bakony group ===
Pos	Team	Pld	W	D	L	GF	GA	GD	Pts	Promotion or relegation
1	Zalaegerszegi TE FC II	34	28	3	3	85	15	+70	87	Promotion to Nemzeti Bajnokság II
2	Győri ETO FC II	34	26	7	1	102	17	+85	85	Promotion to Nemzeti Bajnokság II
3	Hévíz FC	34	21	9	4	71	34	+37	72	
4	Sárvári FC	34	20	7	7	70	30	+40	63 (Note: 4 points deducted)	
5	Lami-Véd Bük TK	34	19	4	11	73	42	+31	61	
6	Csornai SE	34	17	5	12	55	48	+7	56	
7	Femat Csesztreg SE	34	16	5	13	70	43	+27	53	
8	Soproni VSE-GYSEV	34	16	4	14	62	54	+8	52	
9	Celldömölki VSE	34	14	7	13	59	55	+4	49	
10	Tapolca	34	12	13	9	46	37	+9	49	
11	Veszprém FC	34	14	7	13	65	43	+22	47 (Note: 2 points deducted)	
12	Andráshida LSC (Note: due to financial reasons Andráshida participated in the Megyei Bajnokság I)	34	11	10	13	48	41	+7	43	Relegation to Megyei Bajnokság I
13	Répcelaki SE	34	11	5	18	39	58	−19	38	
14	SAB Vép - Dominó Trans	34	8	5	21	39	94	−55	29	
15	Kapuvári SE	34	8	4	22	38	89	−51	28	Relegation to Megyei Bajnokság I
16	FC Keszthely	34	3	3	28	23	126	−103	12	Relegation to Megyei Bajnokság I
17	Márkó SE (Note: results were deleted)	0	0	0	0	0	0	0	0	Relegation to Megyei Bajnokság I
18	FC Sopron II (Note: results were deleted)	0	0	0	0	0	0	0	0	Relegation to Megyei Bajnokság I

=== Dráva group ===
Pos	Team	Pld	W	D	L	GF	GA	GD	Pts	Relegation
1	Szentlőrinci SE	34	26	5	3	89	24	+65	83	
2	Balatonlelle SE	34	21	6	7	62	29	+33	66 (Note: 3 points deducted)	
3	Bogád SE	34	18	8	8	58	45	+13	62	
4	Paksi FC II	34	17	8	9	76	46	+30	59	
5	Kaposvári Rákóczi FC II	34	16	9	9	71	41	+30	57	
6	Szekszárdi UFC	34	16	8	10	56	43	+13	56	
7	Pécsváradi Spartacus	34	17	4	13	74	60	+14	55	
8	Bonyhád VLC	34	16	7	11	63	57	+6	55	
9	Marcali VFC	34	15	7	12	61	53	+8	52	
10	Nagyatádi FC	34	14	9	11	74	50	+24	51	
11	Dombóvári FC-Rutin	34	14	7	13	52	43	+9	49	
12	Beremendi ÉSK	34	12	4	18	47	67	−20	40	
13	Mohácsi TE	34	10	7	17	49	53	−4	37	
14	NTE 1866	34	10	7	17	51	63	−12	37	
15	Pécsi VSK Fürge Nyuszi	34	8	8	18	35	66	−31	32	
16	Csurgói TK	34	8	6	20	40	81	−41	30	Relegation to Megyei Bajnokság I
17	Tamási FC	34	5	4	25	46	115	−69	16 (Note: 3 points deducted)	Relegation to Megyei Bajnokság I
18	Bólyi SE	34	3	6	25	38	106	−68	15	Relegation to Megyei Bajnokság I

=== Duna group ===
Pos	Team	Pld	W	D	L	GF	GA	GD	Pts	Promotion or relegation
1	Százhalombattai LK	30	20	8	2	67	21	+46	68	Promotion to Nemzeti Bajnokság II
2	Lindab-Törökbálinti TC	30	16	7	7	58	32	+26	55	
3	FC Fehérvár II	30	17	3	10	51	34	+17	54	
4	Pénzügyőr SE	30	17	3	10	53	46	+7	54	
5	BFC Siófok II	30	13	8	9	58	37	+21	47	
6	Móri SE	30	13	7	10	61	37	+24	46	
7	III. Kerületi TUE	30	13	7	10	53	39	+14	46	
8	Csepel FC	30	10	13	7	38	29	+9	43	
9	Tatai HAC	30	12	6	12	31	40	−9	42	Relegation to Megyei Bajnokság I
10	Martonvásári SK	30	11	8	11	48	53	−5	41	Relegation to Megyei Bajnokság I
11	FC Tatabánya-Auto Trader II	30	11	6	13	47	59	−12	39	Relegation to Megyei Bajnokság I
12	Budafoki LC	30	11	5	14	46	55	−9	38	
13	Sárisáp-SIKÉR SE	30	8	11	11	35	39	−4	35	
14	Dorogi FC	30	7	4	19	24	65	−41	25	
15	Bp. Erőmű SE	30	4	7	19	26	57	−31	19	Relegation to Megyei Bajnokság I
16	Budakalászi MSE	30	2	7	21	24	77	−53	13	Relegation to Megyei Bajnokság I

=== Mátra group ===
Pos	Team	Pld	W	D	L	GF	GA	GD	Pts	Promotion or relegation
1	MTK Budapest FC II	30	26	1	3	92	26	+66	79	Promotion to Nemzeti Bajnokság II
2	Tura VSK	30	21	3	6	72	33	+39	66	
3	Putnok VSE	30	13	7	10	63	50	+13	46	
4	Veresegyház VSK	30	13	7	10	43	40	+3	46	
5	Rákosszentmihályi AFC	30	12	8	10	40	38	+2	44	
6	Egri FC	30	11	8	11	40	45	−5	41	
7	Gyöngyösi AK-YTONG	30	12	4	14	42	44	−2	40	
8	Salgótarján-Baglyasalja FC	30	11	7	12	48	44	+4	40	
9	Tiszafüredi VSE	30	10	8	12	53	50	+3	38	
10	Balassagyarmati VSE-Nógrád Volán	30	10	8	12	35	48	−13	38	
11	Jászapáti VSE	30	11	4	15	44	57	−13	37	
12	Ózdi FC	30	11	4	15	43	68	−25	37	
13	Újpest FC II	30	9	7	14	39	44	−5	34	
14	Maglódi KSK	30	9	5	16	39	60	−21	32	
15	Dunakeszi Vasutas SE	30	9	4	17	36	48	−12	31	Relegation to Megyei Bajnokság I
16	Felsőzsolca VSC	30	6	7	17	33	67	−34	25	Relegation to Megyei Bajnokság I

=== Tisza group ===
Pos	Team	Pld	W	D	L	GF	GA	GD	Pts	Promotion or relegation
1	Debreceni VSC-DEAC	30	25	2	3	91	25	+66	77	Promotion to Nemzeti Bajnokság II
2	Várda SE	30	18	6	6	65	30	+35	60	
3	Nyírmadai ISE	30	18	5	7	69	38	+31	59	
4	Diósgyőri VTK II	30	18	4	8	62	28	+34	58	
5	Hajdúböszörményi TE	30	16	8	6	50	29	+21	56	
6	Nagyecsed Rákóczi SE	30	15	8	7	53	32	+21	53	
7	Nyíregyháza Spartacus FC II	30	14	8	8	42	30	+12	50	
8	Balmazújvárosi FC	30	13	9	8	53	45	+8	48	
9	Ibrány SE	30	11	4	15	43	47	−4	37	
10	Volán-Sényő SC	30	10	7	13	44	57	−13	37	
11	Berettyóújfalu SE	30	7	8	15	43	57	−14	29	
12	Létavértes SC '97	30	8	5	17	48	60	−12	28 (Note: 1 point deducted)	
13	Balkányi SE	30	8	4	18	29	75	−46	28	
14	Hajdúnánás FK	30	7	5	18	25	51	−26	26	Relegation to Megyei Bajnokság I
15	Mátészalka FC	30	5	3	22	28	71	−43	18	Relegation to Megyei Bajnokság I
16	Nyíradony VVTK	30	1	6	23	26	96	−70	9	Relegation to Megyei Bajnokság I

== See also ==
- 2007–08 Magyar Kupa
- 2007–08 Nemzeti Bajnokság I
- 2007–08 Nemzeti Bajnokság II
