= 2006–07 Nemzeti Bajnokság III =

Nemzeti Bajnokság III
- Season: 2006–07
- Champions: Ceglédi VSE (Alföld); FC Ajka (Bakony); Kozármisleny SE (Dráva); VSK Tököl (Duna); Erzsébeti Spartacus MTK LE (Mátra); Balkányi SE (Tisza)
- Promoted: Ceglédi VSE (Alföld); FC Ajka (Bakony); Kozármisleny SE (Dráva); Komlói Bányász SK (Dráva); VSK Tököl (Duna); Erzsébeti Spartacus MTK LE (Mátra); Mezőkövesdi SE (Mátra)

The 2006–07 Nemzeti Bajnokság III season was the 26th edition of the Nemzeti Bajnokság III.

== League table ==
=== Alföld group ===
Pos	Team	Pld	W	D	L	GF	GA	GD	Pts	Promotion or relegation
1	Ceglédi VSE	26	17	6	3	52	26	+26	57	Promoted to Nemzeti Bajnokság II
2	Hódmezővásárhely FC	26	16	3	7	62	26	+36	51	
3	Örkény SE	26	15	4	7	36	28	+8	49	
4	Monori SE	26	14	4	8	56	38	+18	46	
5	Algyő SK	26	13	6	7	54	29	+25	45	
6	Szolnoki Spartacus	26	13	4	9	49	39	+10	43	
7	Kiskunfélegyházi Honvéd TK	26	12	5	9	40	28	+12	41	
8	Gyulai Termál FC	26	12	4	10	44	44	0	40	
9	Mezőtúri AFC	26	12	2	12	49	50	−1	38	Relegation to Megyei Bajnokság I
10	Bajai LSE	26	8	2	16	44	53	−9	26	
11	Túrkevei VSE	26	7	5	14	31	51	−20	26	Relegation to Megyei Bajnokság I
12	Újszászi VVSE	26	6	6	14	36	56	−20	24	Relegation to Megyei Bajnokság I
13	Csongrád TSE	26	5	3	18	33	66	−33	18	
14	Szarvasi FC	26	3	4	19	22	74	−52	13	Relegation to Megyei Bajnokság I

=== Bakony group ===
Pos	Team	Pld	W	D	L	GF	GA	GD	Pts	Promotion or relegation
1	FC Ajka	26	23	2	1	79	23	+56	71	Promoted to Nemzeti Bajnokság II
2	RECOP Andráshida SC	26	15	6	5	55	24	+31	51	
3	Sárvári FC	26	15	4	7	61	27	+34	49	
4	Soproni VSE	26	14	7	5	49	26	+23	49	
5	ELMAX-Vasas SE Pápa	26	13	7	6	53	28	+25	46	Relegation to Megyei Bajnokság I
6	FEMAT-Csesztreg SE	26	12	6	8	53	39	+14	42	
7	Lami-Véd Bük TK	26	9	6	11	37	38	−1	33	
8	Répcelaki SE	26	8	9	9	20	24	−4	33	
9	Taplocai IAC-Honvéd VSE	26	8	8	10	28	31	−3	32	
10	Kapuvári SE	26	7	9	10	28	45	−17	30	
11	Csornai SE	26	6	7	13	38	43	−5	25	
12	FC Keszthely	26	6	5	15	27	65	−38	23	
13	Jánossomorja SE	26	3	3	20	17	61	−44	12	Relegation to Megyei Bajnokság I
14	Sümeg VSE	26	2	3	21	20	91	−71	9	Relegation to Megyei Bajnokság I

=== Dráva group ===
Pos	Team	Pld	W	D	L	GF	GA	GD	Pts	Promotion or relegation
1	Kozármisleny SE	26	19	3	4	55	22	+33	60	Promoted to Nemzeti Bajnokság II
2	Komlói Bányász SK	26	18	2	6	61	25	+36	56	Promoted to Nemzeti Bajnokság II
3	Szentlőrinc SE	26	17	5	4	66	16	+50	56	
4	Marcali VFC	26	15	3	8	48	30	+18	48	
5	Nagyatád FC	26	14	6	6	46	28	+18	48	
6	Bogád SE	26	9	7	10	29	30	−1	34	
7	Bonyhád VLC	26	9	6	11	38	48	−10	33	
8	Bólyi SE	26	10	2	14	29	46	−17	32	
9	Csurgói TK	26	9	4	13	34	46	−12	31	
10	Mohács TE	26	9	3	14	34	49	−15	30	
11	Pécsi VSK	26	8	3	15	41	51	−10	27	
12	Dombóvár FC	26	8	3	15	26	45	−19	27	
13	Beremendi Építők SK	26	7	2	17	34	62	−28	23	
14	Siklós FC	26	3	5	18	18	61	−43	14	Relegation to Megyei Bajnokság I

=== Duna group ===
Pos	Team	Pld	W	D	L	GF	GA	GD	Pts	Promotion or relegation
1	VSK Tököl	26	17	5	4	47	23	+24	56	Promoted to Nemzeti Bajnokság II
2	Pénzügyőr SE	26	15	7	4	56	34	+22	52	
3	Százhalombatta VUK SE	26	14	6	6	59	26	+33	48	
4	Martonvásári SK	26	14	4	8	51	39	+12	45 (Note: 1 point deducted)	
5	Tamási SE	26	12	5	9	54	52	+2	40 (Note: 1 point deducted)	
6	Dorogi FC	26	11	4	11	45	43	+2	37	
7	Szigetszentmiklósi TK	26	11	5	10	48	39	+9	34 (Note: 4 points deducted)	
8	Móri SE	26	9	5	12	47	48	−1	32	
9	Tatai HAC	26	9	5	12	31	42	−11	32	
10	III. Kerületi TUE	26	8	6	12	41	48	−7	30	
11	Budapesti Erőmű SE	26	7	9	10	25	38	−13	30	
12	Budakalászi MSE	26	8	3	15	35	58	−23	27	Relegation to Megyei Bajnokság I
13	Taksony SE	26	6	7	13	40	47	−7	25	Relegation to Megyei Bajnokság I
14	Enyingi VSE (Note: withdrew)	0	0	0	0	0	0	0	0	Relegation to Megyei Bajnokság I

=== Mátra group ===
Pos	Team	Pld	W	D	L	GF	GA	GD	Pts	Promotion or relegation
1	ESMTK LE	26	18	5	3	66	25	+41	59	Promoted to Nemzeti Bajnokság II
2	Putnok VSE	26	18	4	4	73	34	+39	58	
3	Mezőkövesdi SE	26	14	9	3	53	28	+25	51	Promoted to Nemzeti Bajnokság II
4	Tura VSK	26	14	4	8	67	41	+26	46	
5	Gyöngyösi AK	26	11	8	7	48	36	+12	41	
6	Dabas FC	26	12	2	12	48	44	+4	38	
7	Dunakeszi VSE	26	11	5	10	43	41	+2	38	
8	Ózdi FC	26	9	7	10	37	41	−4	34	
9	Balassagyarmati VSE-Nógrád Volán	26	8	9	9	34	37	−3	33	
10	Veresegyház VSK	26	9	2	15	42	48	−6	29	
11	Maglód KSK	26	8	2	16	39	57	−18	26	
12	Rákosszentmihályi AFC	26	6	6	14	27	42	−15	24	
13	Felsőzsolca VSC	26	6	3	17	38	69	−31	21	
14	Nagykáta SE	26	3	4	19	23	95	−72	13	Relegation to Megyei Bajnokság I

=== Tisza group ===
Pos	Team	Pld	W	D	L	GF	GA	GD	Pts	Relegation
1	Balkányi SE	26	20	3	3	76	19	+57	63	
2	Nyírmadai ISE	26	19	3	4	54	23	+31	60	
3	Ibrány VSE	26	16	7	3	62	23	+39	55	
4	Létavértes '97 SC	26	14	6	6	62	27	+35	48	
5	Balmazújvárosi FC	26	11	5	10	45	47	−2	38	
6	Mátészalka FC	26	9	8	9	37	40	−3	35	
7	Hajdúböszörményi TE	26	9	7	10	41	54	−13	34	
8	Hajdúnánás FK	26	9	7	10	27	40	−13	34	
9	Volán-Sényő SC	26	9	5	12	41	46	−5	32	
10	Rakamazi Spartacus SE	26	9	3	14	46	49	−3	30	Relegation to Megyei Bajnokság I
11	Berettyóújfalui SE	26	6	10	10	35	47	−12	28	
12	Nyíradony VVTK	26	4	7	15	24	53	−29	19	
13	Sátoraljaújhelyi TKSE	26	4	4	18	34	83	−49	16	Relegation to Megyei Bajnokság I
14	Hajdúszoboszlói SE	26	1	9	16	19	52	−33	12	Relegation to Megyei Bajnokság I

== See also ==
- 2006–07 Magyar Kupa
- 2006–07 Nemzeti Bajnokság I
- 2006–07 Nemzeti Bajnokság II
