= FC Pápa =

Hungarian football club

- Full name: Futball Club Pápa
- Founded: 1953
- Dissolved: 2007
- Ground: Vasas pálya
Home colours

Futball Club Pápa (or Elekthermax Vasas SE Pápa) is a deunct professional football club based in Pápa, Veszprém County, Hungary.

== History ==
FC Pápa won the Bakony group of the 2005–06 Nemzeti Bajnokság III season. However, they did not gain promotion to the second division.

== Ground ==
The owner maintained the field, though no official soccer matches were played at the stadium afterward. However, sporting life continued on the small cinder fields; amateur teams, as well as matches in the city's small-field league, regularly made use of the fields, which are now overgrown with weeds. For a time, a flea market was also held on the clay courts, and in 2017, a show jumping competition was organized on the center court. This was perhaps the last sporting event at the stadium for which the bleachers were used.

== Name changes ==
- Pápai Vasas SE: 1953 - 1990
- Elekthermax Vasas SE Pápa: 1990 - 1994
- FC Pápa: 1994 - 1995
- Elekthermax Vasas SE Pápa: 1995 - 2007

== Honours ==
=== League ===
- Nemzeti Bajnokság III:
  - Winners (1): 2005–06

== Seasons ==
The table below shows the seasons of FC Pápa.

Season	Tier	Club's name	Position	Pts
1954	4	Pápai Vasas	3 / 10	24
1957	4	Pápai Vasas	0 / 8	22
1957–58	4	Pápai Vasas SE	7 / 16	31
1958–59	4	Pápai Vasas	7 / 16	32
1959–60	4	Pápai Vasas SK	8 / 17	26
1960–61	4	Pápai Vasas	4 / 17	36
1961–62	4	Pápai Vasas	7 / 17	32
1962–63	4	Pápai Vasas	6 / 17	33
1963	5	Pápai Vasas	2 / 8	20
1964	5	Pápai Vasas	1 / 16	43
1965	4	Pápai Vasas	9 / 16	29
1966	4	Pápai Vasas	13 / 16	23
1967	4	Pápai Vasas	9 / 16	28
1968	4	Pápai Vasas	11 / 16	28
1969	4	Pápai Vasas	13 / 16	29
1970	4	Pápai Vasas	10 / 16	14
1970–71	4	Pápai Vasas	12 / 16	27
1971–72	4	Pápai Vasas	7 / 16	32
1972–73	4	Pápai Vasas	8 / 16	30
1973–74	4	Pápai Vasas	11 / 16	28
1974–75	4	Pápai Vasas SE	2 / 16	47
1975–76	4	Pápai Vasas SE	3 / 16	41
1976–77	4	Pápai Vasas SE	2 / 16	52
1977–78	4	Pápai Vasas SE	4 / 16	40
1978–79	3	Pápai Vasas SE	5 / 16	39
1979–80	3	Pápai Vasas SE	10 / 16	25
1980–81	3	Pápai Vasas SE	5 / 18	42
1981–82	4	Pápai Vasas SE	4 / 16	40
1982–83	4	Pápai Vasas SE	10 / 16	24
1983–84	4	Pápai Vasas SE	1 / 16	50
1984–85	3	Pápai Vasas	16 / 18	21
1985–86	4	Pápai Vasas SE	4 / 16	38
1986–87	4	Pápai Vasas SE	4 / 16	41
1987–88	4	Pápai Vasas SE	2 / 16	44
1988–89	4	Pápai Vasas SE	2 / 14	38
1989–90	4	Elekthermax Vasas SE	5 / 16	50
1990–91	4	Elekthermax Vasas SE	5 / 16	33
1991–92	4	Elekthermax Vasas SE	3 / 16	41
1992–93	4	ELMAX Vasas Pápa	1 / 16	48
1993–94	3	ELMAX Vasas SE Pápa	15 / 16	16
1994–95	4	FC Pápa	15 / 16	17
1995–96	5	ELMAX Vasas Pápa	13 / 14	23
1996–97	6	ELMAX Vasas SE Pápa	2 / 9	36
1997–98	7	Elmax Vasas Pápa	1 / 8	38
1998–99	6	Elmax Vasas	1 / 14	61
1999–00	5	Elekthermax Vasas SE	1 / 16	62
2000	3	Elmax Vasas Pápa	6 / 8	16
2000–01	4	Elmax Vasas Pápa	11 / 11	12
2001–02	4	Elmax VSE Pápa	14 / 14	13
2002–03	5	Elekthermax Vasas SE	1 / 17	81
2003–04	4	ELMAX-Pápa	8 / 16	48
2004–05	4	Elekthermax Pápa	4 / 14	45
2005–06	3	Elekthermax Vasas SE (Pápa)	1 / 16	59
2006–07	3	ELMAX-Vasas SE Pápa	5 / 14	46
