= 2006–07 Nemzeti Bajnokság II =

Nemzeti Bajnokság II
- Season: 2006–07
- Champions: Siófok (West); Nyíregyháza (East)
- Promoted: Siófok (West); Nyíregyháza (East)
- Relegated: Celldömölk (West); Hévíz (West); Balatonlelle (West); Békéscsaba (East); Jászapáti (East); Budafok (East)
- All statistics correct as of 15 July 2008.

The 2006–07 Nemzeti Bajnokság II was Hungary's 109th season of the Nemzeti Bajnokság II, the second tier of the Hungarian football league system.

== League table ==
=== Western group ===
Pos	Team	Pld	W	D	L	GF	GA	GD	Pts	Promotion or relegation
1	Siófok (P)	30	19	5	6	59	24	+35	62	Promotion to Nemzeti Bajnokság I
2	Haladás	30	21	5	4	66	25	+41	60 (Note: 8 points deducted)	
3	Felcsút	30	18	6	6	52	25	+27	60	
4	Barcs	30	18	5	7	49	30	+19	59	
5	Pápa	30	14	9	7	42	24	+18	51	
6	Dunaújváros	30	15	1	14	51	46	+5	46	
7	Gyirmót	30	16	5	9	58	40	+18	44 (Note: 9 points deducted)	
8	Mosonmagyaróvár	30	12	4	14	45	63	−18	40	
9	Soroksár	30	11	6	13	35	30	+5	39	
10	Kaposvölgye	30	11	6	13	37	48	−11	39	
11	Integrál-DAC	30	10	9	11	53	48	+5	39	
12	BKV Előre	30	10	8	12	41	48	−7	38	
13	Budaörs	30	8	7	15	32	51	−19	31	
14	Celldömölk (R)	30	5	6	19	22	57	−35	21	Relegation to Nemzeti Bajnokság III
15	Hévíz (R)	30	5	3	22	23	49	−26	18	Relegation to Nemzeti Bajnokság III
16	Balatonlelle (R)	30	2	5	23	24	81	−57	11	Relegation to Nemzeti Bajnokság III

Source: Hungarian Football Federation (in Hungarian), Soccerway
Rules for classification: 1) Points; 2) Matches won; 3) Goal difference; 4) Goals scored; 5) Head-to-head points; 6) Head-to-head goal difference; 7) Head-to-head away goals scored; 8) Fair play ranking; 9) Drawing of lots.
(P) Promoted; (R) Relegated

=== Eastern group ===
Pos	Team	Pld	W	D	L	GF	GA	GD	Pts	Promotion or relegation
1	Nyíregyháza (P)	30	20	9	1	67	24	+43	69	Promotion to Nemzeti Bajnokság I
2	Ferencváros	30	18	11	1	70	21	+49	65	
3	Orosháza	30	16	7	7	58	40	+18	55	
4	Szolnok	30	13	10	7	45	35	+10	49	
5	Bőcs	30	12	10	8	37	37	0	46	
6	Tuzsér SE	30	13	6	11	40	47	−7	45	
7	Vecsés	30	11	9	10	49	43	+6	42	
8	Kecskemét	30	10	10	10	46	46	0	40	
9	Karcag SE	30	9	10	11	31	39	−8	37	
10	Baktalórántháza	30	8	9	13	33	44	−11	33	
11	Makó	30	9	8	13	30	45	−15	32 (Note: 3 points deducted)	
12	Kazincbarcika	30	6	14	10	41	45	−4	32	
13	Jászberény	30	9	2	19	40	55	−15	29	
14	Békéscsaba (R)	30	8	4	18	33	48	−15	28	Relegation to Nemzeti Bajnokság III
15	Jászapáti (R)	30	7	6	17	26	48	−22	27	Relegation to Nemzeti Bajnokság III
16	Budafok (R)	30	6	5	19	31	60	−29	23	Relegation to Nemzeti Bajnokság III

Source: Hungarian Football Federation (in Hungarian), Soccerway
Rules for classification: 1) Points; 2) Matches won; 3) Goal difference; 4) Goals scored; 5) Head-to-head points; 6) Head-to-head goal difference; 7) Head-to-head away goals scored; 8) Fair play ranking; 9) Drawing of lots.
(P) Promoted; (R) Relegated

== See also ==
- 2006–07 Magyar Kupa
- 2006–07 Nemzeti Bajnokság I
- 2006–07 Nemzeti Bajnokság III
