= Tuzsér =

Coordinates: 48°21′N 22°08′E

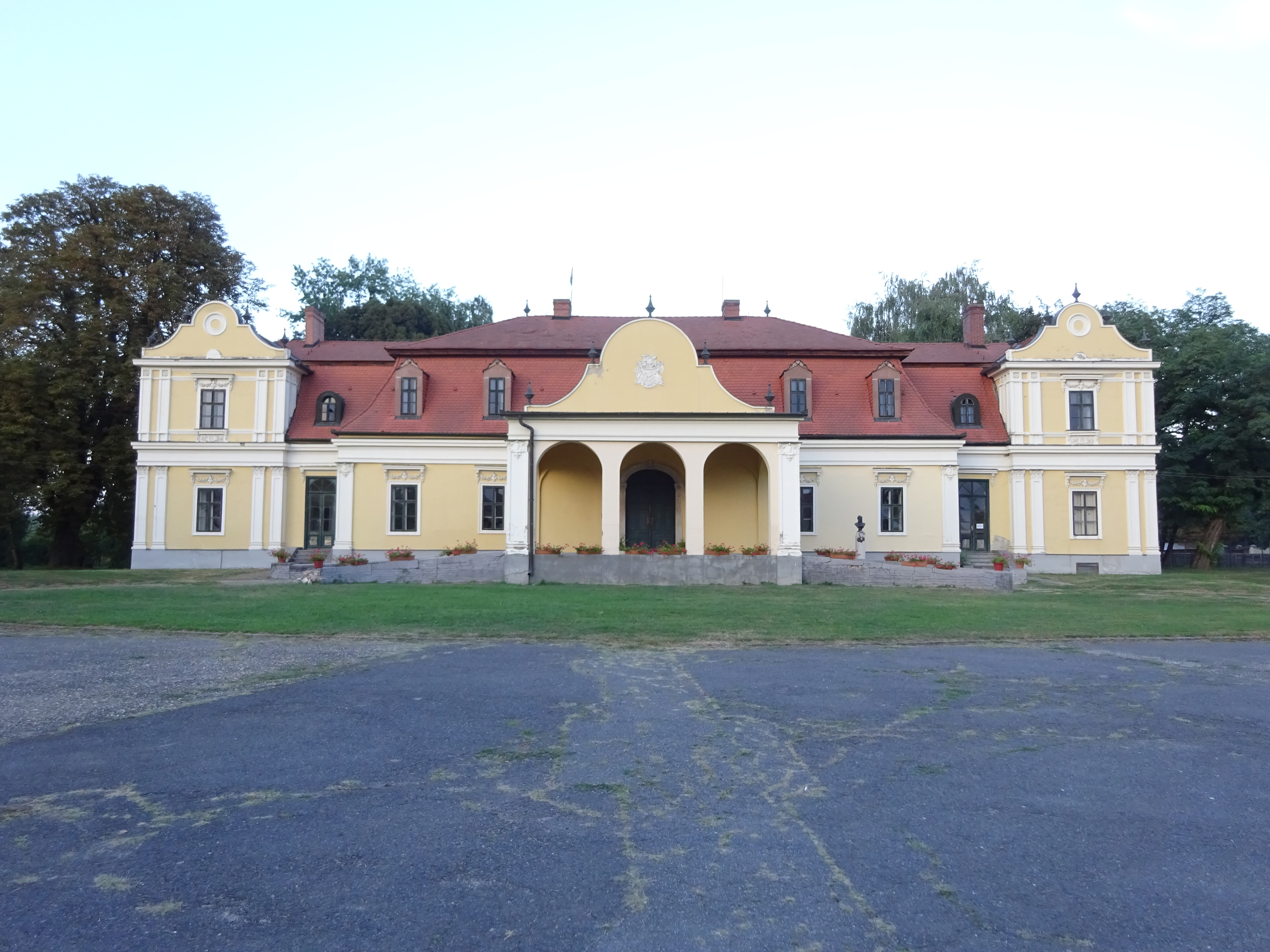
- Interactive map of Tuzsér
- Country: Hungary
- County: Szabolcs-Szatmár-Bereg

Area
  - Total: 15.51 km^{2} (5.99 sq mi)

Population (2001)
  - Total: 3,373
  - Density: 217.47/km^{2} (563.2/sq mi)
- Time zone: UTC+1 (CET)
  - Summer (DST): UTC+2 (CEST)
- Postal code: 4623
- Area code: 45

Location of Szabolcs-Szatmar-Bereg county in Hungary

Tuzsér is a village in Szabolcs-Szatmár-Bereg county, in the Northern Great Plain region of eastern Hungary.

== Geography ==
It covers an area of 15.51 km^{2} (6 sq mi) and has a population of 3205 according to the 2022 census.

== Sport ==
- Tuzsér SE, association football club
