= Rákosszentmihályi AFC =

Hungarian football club

- Full name: Rákosszentmihályi Atlétikai és Football Club
- Founded: 1913
- Ground: Pirosrózsa utcai sportpálya
- Capacity: 550
- League: BLASZ I
Home colours

Rákosszentmihályi Atlétikai és Football Club is a professional football club based in Rákosszentmihály, Budapest, Hungary, that competes in the Nemzeti Bajnokság III, the third tier of Hungarian football.

== History ==
Rákosszentmihályi AFC reached the 6th round of the 2017–18 Magyar Kupa.

== Name changes ==
- 1913–1920: Rákosszentmihályi AFC
- 1920: merger with a Rákosszentmihályi SC-vel, Rákosszentmihályi TK néven
- 1924: reestablished
- 1929: merger with Corvin Sashalmi TC
- 1924–1936: Rákosszentmihályi AFC
- 1936: merger with MOVE
- 1936–1941: MOVE Rákosszentmihályi Athletikai és Football Club
- 1941–1945: MOVE Rákosszentmihályi Társadalmi és Sport Egyesület
- 1945–present: Rákosszentmihályi Atlétikai és Football Club

== Current squad ==
Note: Flags indicate national team as defined under FIFA eligibility rules; some limited exceptions apply. Players may hold more than one non-FIFA nationality.

No.	Pos.	Nation	Player
1	GK	HUN	Máté Téglás
2	DF	HUN	Tamás Ébenhardt
3	DF	HUN	Pál Etler
5	MF	HUN	Máté Balatoni
6	MF	HUN	István Vörös
7	MF	HUN	Márk Szalay
8	DF	HUN	Talán Tóth
15	MF	HUN	Csongor Gálosi
16	GK	HUN	Bálint Filipánics
18	FW	HUN	Alexander Pendl
19	FW	HUN	Gábor Janta

== Managers ==
- Pál Eitler (2025-present)

== Seasons ==
As of 20 October 2026.

Season	Tier	Club's name	Position	Pts
1915	4	Rákosszentmihályi AFC	2 / 7	9
1916	2	Rákosszentmihályi AFC	4 / 10	7
1916–17	3	Rákosszentmihályi AFC	7 / 14	12
1917–18	3	Rákosszentmihályi AFC	7 / 10	10
1918–19	3	Rákosszentmihályi AFC	3 / 12	12
1919–20	3	Rákosszentmihályi AFC	3 / 15	38
1920–21	3	Rákosszentmihályi AFC	8 / 11	2
1925–26	3	Rákosszentmihályi AFC	3 / 12	28
1926–27	4	Rákosszentmihályi AFC	4 / 14	34
1927–28	4	Rákosszentmihályi AFC	6 / 16	37
1928–29	4	Rákosszentmihályi AFC	3 / 16	40
1929–30	4	Rákosszentmihályi AFC	7 / 12	19
1930–31	4	Rákosszentmihályi AFC	5 / 15	34
1931–32	4	Rákosszentmihályi AFC	12 / 16	26
1932–33	4	Rákosszentmihályi AFC	15 / 16	19
1933–34	4	Rákosszentmihályi AFC	5 / 11	21
1934–35	4	Rákosszentmihályi AFC	13 / 13	15
1935–36	5	Rákosszentmihályi AFC	10 / 12	16
1936–37	5	Rákosszentmihályi AFC	2 / 13	35
1937–38	4	Rákosszentmihályi AFC	5 / 14	32
1938–39	3	MOVE Rákosszentmihályi AFC	5 / 14	29
1938–39	5	Rákosszentmihályi AFC	14 / 14	7
1939–40	3	MOVE Rákosszentmihályi AFC	3 / 15	39
1940–41	4	MOVE Rákosszentmihályi TSE	1 / 12	35
1941–42	3	MOVE Rákosszentmihályi TSE	10 / 16	26
1942–43	3	MOVE Rákosszentmihályi TSE	4 / 14	30
1943–44	3	MOVE Rákosszentmihályi TSE	12 / 16	20
1944–45	2	MOVE Rákosszentmihályi TSE	15 / 16	2
1944–45	3	MOVE Rákosszentmihályi TSE	0 / 14	
1992–93	6	Rákosszentmihályi AFC	4 / 11	13
1993–94	5	Rákosszentmihályi AFC	5 / 16	34
1994–95	5	Rákosszentmihályi AFC	1 / 16	76
1995–96	4	Rákosszentmihályi AFC	3 / 16	60
1996–97	4	Rákosszentmihályi AFC	1 / 16	74
1997–98	4	Rákosszentmihályi AFC	9 / 16	42
1998–99	4	Rákosszentmihályi AFC	3 / 16	55
1999–00	4	Rákosszentmihályi AFC	9 / 16	40
2000	3	Rákosszentmihályi AFC	7 / 8	11
2000–01	4	Rákosszentmihályi AFC	4 / 10	35
2001–02	4	Rákosszentmihályi AFC	12 / 16	34
2002–03	4	Rákosszentmihályi AFC	12 / 16	34
2003–04	4	Rákosszentmihályi AFC	10 / 16	36
2004–05	4	Rákosszentmihályi AFC	3 / 15	55
2005–06	3	Rákosszentmihályi AFC	13 / 18	38
2006–07	3	Rákosszentmihályi AFC	12 / 14	24
2007–08	3	Rákosszentmihályi AFC	5 / 16	44
2008–09	3	Rákosszentmihályi AFC	12 / 16	34
2009–10	3	Rákosszentmihályi AFC	13 / 14	19
2010–11	3	Rákosszentmihályi AFC	16 / 16	20
2011–12	3	Rákosszentmihályi AFC	11 / 16	33
2012–13	3	Rákosszentmihályi AFC	15 / 15	8
2013–14	4	Rákosszentmihályi AFC	3 / 16	59
2014–15	4	Rákosszentmihályi AFC	8 / 16	42
2015–16	4	Rákosszentmihályi AFC	7 / 16	49
2016–17	4	Rákosszentmihályi AFC	5 / 16	50
2017–18	4	Rákosszentmihályi AFC	12 / 16	28
2018–19	4	Rákosszentmihályi AFC	15 / 16	13
2019–20	5	Rákosszentmihályi AFC	1 / 16	41
2020–21	4	Rákosszentmihályi AFC	15 / 16	17
2021–22	5	Rákosszentmihályi AFC	6 / 14	39
2022–23	5	Rákosszentmihályi AFC	9 / 14	26
2023–24	5	Rákosszentmihályi AFC	10 / 14	27
2024–25	6	Rákosszentmihályi AFC	6 / 14	44
2025–26	6	Rákosszentmihályi AFC	2 / 14	62
