= VSK Tököl =

Hungarian football club

- Full name: Városi Sportkör Tököl
- Founded: 1922
- Ground: Sport utca
- Capacity: 1,500
- League: Megyei Bajnokság I
Home colours

Városi Sportkör Tököl is a football club based in Tököl, Pest County, Hungary, that competes in the Megyei Bajnokság I, the fourth tier of Hungarian football.

== History ==
Városi Sportkör Tököl won the Duna group of the 2006-07 Nemzeti Bajnokság III season and were promoted to the second division. In the 2007–08 Nemzeti Bajnokság II season, Tököl finished in the 12th position and avoided relegation. However, in the subsequent season, in 2008–09 Nemzeti Bajnokság II, Tököl finished in the 16th position and were relegated to the third division.

Tököli VSK won the Alföld group of the 2010–11 Nemzeti Bajnokság III season; however, they were not promoted to the second tier.

== Name changes ==
- ?-1945: Tököli LE
- 1945-1949: Tököli SE
- 1949-1951: Tököl
- 1951-?: Tököli SK
- ?-?: Tököli KSK
- ?-?: Tököli SK
- ?-present: Városi Sportkör Tököl

== Honours ==
=== League ===
- Nemzeti Bajnokság III:
  - Winners (2): 2006–07, 2010–11

== Seasons ==
The highest league that VSK Tököl have ever played was the second division.

Season	Tier	Club's name	Position	Pts
2025/2026	5	VSK Tököl	10 / 16	43
2024/2025	5	VSK Tököl	12 / 16	28
2023/2024	6	VSK Tököl	1 / 14	65
2022/2023	4	VSK Tököl	11 / 16	29
2021/2022	4	Tököl VSK	10 / 16	35
2020/2021	4	Tököl VSK	13 / 16	29
2019/2020	4	Tököl VSK	11 / 16	19
2018/2019	4	Tököl VSK	10 / 16	36
2017/2018	4	Tököl VSK	11 / 16	31
2016/2017	4	Tököl VSK	12 / 16	32
2015/2016	4	Tököl VSK	8 / 16	43
2014/2015	3	Tököl VSK	15 / 16	6
2013/2014	3	Tököli VSK	15 / 16	18
2012/2013	3	Tököl VSK	5 / 14	45
2011/2012	3	Tököl VSK	7 / 16	45
2010/2011	3	Tököl VSK	1 / 15	56
2009/2010	3	Tököl VSK	5 / 14	46
2008/2009	2	Tököl VSK	16 / 16	15
2007/2008	2	Tököl VSK	12 / 16	32
2006/2007	3	Tököl	1 / 14	56
2005/2006	3	Tököl KSK	4 / 18	61
2004/2005	5	Tököl	1 / 16	75
2003/2004	5	Tököl	3 / 16	66
2002/2003	5	Tököl	4 / 16	52
2001/2002	5	Tököl	8 / 16	34
2000/2001	5	Tököl	7 / 18	52
1999/2000	5	Tököl	9 / 18	47
1998/1999	5	Tököl	6 / 18	54
1997/1998	6	Tököl	1 / 16	78
1996/1997	5	Tököl	4 / 16	52
1995/1996	6	Tököl	1 / 14	69
1994/1995	6	Tököl	3 / 15	59
1993/1994	5	Tököl	14 / 16	22
1992/1993	5	Tököl	8 / 16	31
1991/1992	5	Tököl	3 / 16	35
1990/1991	5	Tököl	11 / 16	27
1989/1990	5	Tököl	3 / 14	31
1988/1989	6	Tököl	1 / 12	19
1987/1988	5	Tököli KSK	12 / 14	17
1986/1987	6	Tököl	1 / 12	36
1985/1986	6	Tököl	2 / 11	18
1984/1985	6	Tököl	8 / 10	9
1983/1984	5	Tököl	13 / 14	11
1982/1983	6	Tököl	1 / 8	39
1980/1981	4	Tököl	0 / 14	
1979/1980	4	Tököl	9 / 16	29
1977/1978	5	Tököl	0 / 12	
1976/1977	5	Tököl	11 / 14	19
1975/1976	5	Tököl	0 / 14	
1974/1975	5	Tököl	0 / 14	
1973/1974	7	Tököl	5 / 13	35
1972/1973	6	Tököl	15 / 16	11
1971/1972	5	Tököli SK	16 / 16	19
1970/1971	5	Tököli SK	10 / 16	27
1970	5	Tököli SK	5 / 8	12
1969	5	Tököli SK	7 / 16	32
1968	5	Tököli SK	9 / 16	31
1967	4	Tököli SK	16 / 16	14
1966	4	Tököl SK	15 / 16	17
1965	4	Tököl SK	11 / 16	26
1964	5	Tököli SK	1 / 16	48
1963	5	Tököli KSK	4 / 16	17
1962/1963	4	Tököl	4 / 16	33
1961/1962	5	Tököli KSK	1 / 14	36
1960/1961	5	Tököl	2 / 10	29
1959/1960	5	Tököl	2 / 13	38
1958/1959	4	Tököli KSK	16 / 16	16
1957/1958	4	Tököli KSK	11 / 16	28
1957	4	Tököl	1 / 10	23
1952	4	Tököli KSK	0 / 14	
1951	4	Tököl	0 / 10	
1950	5	Tököl	2 / 9	12
1949/1950	5	Tököl	8 / 11	18
1947/1948	5	Tököli SE	0 / 14	
1946/1947	5	Tököli SE	0 / 12	
1943/1944	5	Tököli LE	3 / 5	9
