= 2000–01 Nemzeti Bajnokság III =

Nemzeti Bajnokság III
- Season: 2000–01
- Champions: Büki TK (West); Erzsébeti Spartacus MTK LE (Center); Eger FC (East)
- Promoted: Büki TK (West); Erzsébeti Spartacus MTK LE (Center)

The 2000–01 Nemzeti Bajnokság III season was the 19th edition of the Nemzeti Bajnokság III.

== League tables ==
=== Western group ===
Pos	Team	Pld	W	D	L	GF	GA	GD	Pts	Promotion or relegation
1	Büki TK	22	16	3	3	54	20	+34	51	Promotion to Nemzeti Bajnokság II
2	Pécsi VSK	22	14	4	4	33	15	+18	46	
3	MTE-Motim	22	12	3	7	39	24	+15	39	
4	Veszprém LC	22	10	5	7	33	26	+7	35	
5	Balatonlelle SE	22	10	4	8	30	34	−4	34	
6	Komlói Bányász SK	22	8	5	9	32	33	−1	29	
7	Petőházi SE	22	7	6	9	33	31	+2	27	
8	Tapolca-Honvéd	22	7	6	9	33	37	−4	27	
9	Bonyhád-Agraco FC	22	7	5	10	27	33	−6	26	
10	Tatai HAC	22	6	5	11	33	37	−4	23	
11	Ajka SE	22	5	4	13	33	45	−12	19	
12	Lenti TE	22	3	4	15	17	62	−45	13	Relegation to Megyei Bajnokság I

=== Central group ===
Pos	Team	Pld	W	D	L	GF	GA	GD	Pts	Promotion or relegation
1	Erzsébeti Spartacus MTK	20	12	3	5	38	22	+16	39	Promotion to Nemzeti Bajnokság II
2	Diego FC Dabas	20	11	3	6	45	26	+19	36	
3	Balassagyarmati SE-Nógrád Volán	20	10	5	5	29	17	+12	35	
4	Budafoki LC	20	11	2	7	38	32	+6	35	
5	Kistarcsai PFK	20	10	3	7	42	36	+6	33	
6	Szigetszentmiklósi TK	20	8	5	7	34	33	+1	29	
7	Budakalász	20	7	4	9	32	36	−4	25	
8	Kiskőrös FC	20	7	2	11	27	39	−12	23	Relegation to Megyei Bajnokság I
9	Bajai LSE	20	6	4	10	30	49	−19	22	
10	Kiskunhalasi FC	20	6	3	11	28	32	−4	21	
11	Pilisvörösvár LSE	20	2	6	12	18	39	−21	12	
12	TFC-Cegléd (Note: withdrew)	0	0	0	0	0	0	0	0	

=== Eastern group ===
Pos	Team	Pld	W	D	L	GF	GA	GD	Pts
1	Eger FC	20	11	5	4	34	18	+16	38
2	Diósgyőri VTK	20	10	6	4	32	17	+15	36
3	Orosháza-Csorvás	20	11	2	7	34	25	+9	35
4	Gyulai Termál FC	20	10	4	6	37	25	+12	34
5	FC Tiszaújváros	20	9	3	8	29	20	+9	30
6	Kisléta-Mátészalka	20	7	8	5	27	26	+1	29
7	Demecser FC	20	7	6	7	23	19	+4	27
8	Baktalórántháza VSE	20	8	2	10	30	37	−7	26
9	Jászberény	20	7	4	9	30	23	+7	25
10	Makó FC	20	4	6	10	18	35	−17	18
11	Abony SE	20	2	2	16	14	63	−49	8
12	Kisvárda (Note: withdrew)	0	0	0	0	0	0	0	0

== See also ==
- 2000–01 Magyar Kupa
- 2000–01 Nemzeti Bajnokság I
- 2000–01 Nemzeti Bajnokság II
