= 2000–01 Nemzeti Bajnokság I =

Nemzeti Bajnokság I
- Season: 2000–01
- Dates: 22 July 2000 – 23 June 2001
- Champions: Ferencváros
- Relegated: Haladás; Nyíregyháza; Pécs; Nagykanizsa; Tatabánya
- Champions League: Ferencváros
- UEFA Cup: Dunaferr; Debrecen
- Matches: 244
- Goals: 750 (3.07 per match)
- Top goalscorer: Péter Kabát (24)
- Biggest home win: MTK 6–0 Nagykanizsa
- Biggest away win: Nagykanizsa 0–5 MTK
- Highest scoring: Újpest 8–3 Debrecen

The 2000–01 Nemzeti Bajnokság I, also known as NB I, was the 99th season of top-tier football in Hungary. The league was officially named Borsodi Liga for sponsoring reasons since April 2001. The season started on 22 July 2000 and ended on 23 June 2001.

== Overview ==
It was contested by 12 teams, and Ferencvárosi TC won the championship in a reduced 1st division. Guided by former Headcoach of the Hungarian national team, János Csank, Ferencváros lost only two games during the season, and finished two points above defending champions Dunaferr. Dunaferr started off their title-defense struggling, suffering a 4–1 loss against MTK on opening day, and losing to Ferencváros, DVSC and Kispest within a 4-week period.

Prior to the last day of the season, FTC and Dunaferr were separated by just two points. Both teams won their respective games, with Ferencváros winning 2–0 at Debrecen, and Dunaferr trashing Lombard-Pápa 2-5. The title went to Ferencváros, despite winning one fewer game than runners-up Dunaferr.

Although Debreceni VSC finished in the relegation zone, they were allowed to stay members of the top-flight, as the promoted team of BKV Előre withdrew from the 1st division.

== First stage ==
=== Group A ===
==== League standings ====
Pos	Team	Pld	W	D	L	GF	GA	GD	Pts	Qualification or relegation
1	Tatabánya	14	8	5	1	29	18	+11	29	Qualification for second stage
2	Dunaferr	14	8	5	1	37	20	+17	29	Qualification for second stage
3	Ferencváros	14	6	3	5	23	21	+2	21	Qualification for second stage
4	Sopron	14	6	2	6	21	23	−2	20	Qualification for second stage
5	Győr	14	5	3	6	21	23	−2	18	Qualification for second stage
6	Kispest Honvéd	14	3	6	5	18	20	−2	15	Qualification for second stage
7	Haladás (R)	14	3	4	7	14	24	−10	13	Relegation to Nemzeti Bajnokság II
8	Nyíregyháza (R)	14	3	0	11	10	24	−14	9	Relegation to Nemzeti Bajnokság II

Source: rsssf.com
(R) Relegated

==== Results ====
Home \ Away	DUN	FTC	GYŐ	HAL	HON	NYÍ	SOP	TAT
Dunaferr		5–2	2–1	4–0	5–3	3–0	4–1	2–5
Ferencvárosi	1–1		1–3	4–0	2–2	2–0	2–1	2–2
Győr	1–1	0–3		2–2	2–1	2–0	0–2	3–2
Haladás	1–1	3–0	0–3		1–1	1–0	3–0	1–1
Kispest Honvéd	1–1	1–2	2–0	2–0		2–0	1–1	1–1
Nyíregyháza	2–5	0–1	2–0	1–0	3–1		1–2	0–2
Sopron	1–2	2–1	2–1	3–1	0–0	2–1		3–4
Tatabánya	1–1	1–0	3–3	2–1	2–0	1–0	2–1	

Source: rsssf.com
Legend: Blue = home team win; Yellow = draw; Red = away team win.

=== Group B ===
==== League standings ====
Pos	Team	Pld	W	D	L	GF	GA	GD	Pts	Qualification or relegation
1	MTK Hungária	14	8	3	3	32	13	+19	27	Qualification for second stage
2	Újpest	14	7	4	3	33	19	+14	25	Qualification for second stage
3	Vasas	14	7	4	3	24	11	+13	25	Qualification for second stage
4	Debrecen	14	7	2	5	27	20	+7	23	Qualification for second stage
5	Videoton	14	6	3	5	21	22	−1	21	Qualification for second stage
6	Zalaegerszeg	14	3	7	4	12	22	−10	16	Qualification for second stage
7	Pécs (R)	14	2	3	9	13	24	−11	9	Relegation to Nemzeti Bajnokság II
8	Nagykanizsa (R)	14	2	2	10	12	43	−31	8	Relegation to Nemzeti Bajnokság II

Source: rsssf.com
(R) Relegated

==== Results ====
Home \ Away	DEB	MTK	NAG	PÉC	VAS	VID	UTE	ZTE
Debrecen		2–2	3–0	2–0	0–1	3–1	2–0	4–1
MTK Hungária	2–1		6–0	1–0	1–2	2–3	2–1	0–0
Nagykanizsa	1–3	0–5		3–1	0–4	1–0	2–4	0–0
Pécs	1–0	0–3	5–1		1–3	0–2	1–1	0–1
Vasas	3–1	0–0	4–0	2–0		2–2	1–2	0–0
Videoton	0–3	1–3	2–0	3–2	1–0		1–4	1–1
Újpest	8–3	1–4	4–2	1–1	0–0	0–0		5–0
Zalaegerszeg	0–0	2–1	2–2	1–1	3–2	1–4	0–2	

Source: rsssf.com
Legend: Blue = home team win; Yellow = draw; Red = away team win.

== Second stage ==
=== League standings ===
Pos	Team	Pld	W	D	L	GF	GA	GD	BP	Pts	Qualification or relegation
1	Ferencváros (C)	22	12	8	2	36	14	+22	4	48	Qualification for Champions League second qualifying round
2	Dunaferr	22	13	2	7	40	35	+5	5	46	Qualification for UEFA Cup qualifying round
3	Vasas	22	10	6	6	42	33	+9	4	40	
4	Újpest	22	10	5	7	40	37	+3	5	40	
5	Győr	22	11	5	6	34	32	+2	2	40	
6	MTK Hungária	22	8	5	9	31	22	+9	6	35	
7	Kispest Honvéd	22	9	6	7	33	31	+2	1	34	
8	Videoton	22	9	2	11	37	34	+3	2	31	
9	Sopron	22	7	6	9	26	30	−4	3	30	
10	Zalaegerszeg	22	7	7	8	33	36	−3	1	29	
11	Debrecen	22	6	3	13	31	44	−13	3	24	Qualification for UEFA Cup qualifying round (Note: Debreceni VSC were stayed in league for the next season due to the withdrawal of BKV Előre. Also they won the 2000–01 Hungarian Cup and thereby qualified for the qualifying round of the UEFA Cup.)
12	Tatabánya (R)	22	1	3	18	20	55	−35	6	12	Relegation to Nemzeti Bajnokság II

Source: rsssf.com
(C) Champions; (R) Relegated

=== Results ===
Home \ Away	DEB	DUN	FTC	GYŐ	HON	MTK	SOP	TAT	VAS	VID	UTE	ZTE
Debrecen		2–0	0–2	3–2	2–4	0–4	3–1	2–1	1–2	1–1	3–4	2–1
Dunaferr	2–1		0–0	4–1	0–3	1–2	1–0	3–2	2–2	1–0	2–1	2–1
Ferencváros	2–1	2–0		2–0	1–2	0–0	1–0	0–0	2–0	5–0	2–2	3–2
Győr	2–2	1–3	0–0		3–2	1–0	4–2	3–2	1–0	2–1	2–1	1–1
Kispest Honvéd	0–0	3–4	0–0	0–0		1–0	2–1	3–1	2–2	1–0	2–3	1–1
MTK Hungária	0–1	4–1	5–2	1–2	1–1		0–0	1–0	1–0	2–1	1–2	0–1
Sopron	2–1	1–2	2–3	0–2	2–1	0–0		2–0	1–0	3–2	2–1	0–0
Tatabánya	3–2	2–5	0–5	0–2	0–1	1–5	2–2		1–4	1–3	0–2	1–3
Vasas	2–1	3–2	0–3	1–0	3–1	2–2	1–1	2–0		0–2	6–2	6–3
Videoton	3–1	1–2	0–0	4–1	4–1	1–0	1–2	1–0	2–3		4–0	2–1
Újpest	3–0	3–2	0–1	1–1	0–1	2–1	2–1	1–1	1–1	5–3		3–0
Zalaegerszeg	3–2	0–1	0–0	2–3	3–1	2–1	1–1	3–2	2–2	2–1	1–1	

Source: rsssf.com
Legend: Blue = home team win; Yellow = draw; Red = away team win.

== Statistical leaders ==
=== Top goalscorers ===
Rank	Scorer	Club	Goals
1	(Hungary) Péter Kabát	Vasas SC	24
2	(Hungary) Attila Tököli	Dunaferr SE	22
3	(Hungary) Béla Illés	MTK Hungária	21
4	(Hungary) Zsombor Kerekes	Debreceni VSC	19
5	(Hungary) Krisztián Kenesei	MTK Hungária	18
6	(Hungary) Péter Horváth	Ferencvárosi TC	16

== Attendances ==
#	Club	Average
1	Ferencváros	7,967
2	Zalaegerszeg	7,250
3	Győr	4,667
4	Debrecen	4,583
5	Dunaújváros	4,083
6	Sopron	4,028
7	Vasas	3,583
8	Kispest Honvéd	3,194
9	Újpest	3,113
10	Fehérvár	3,111
11	Szombathelyi Haladás	3,083
12	Tatabánya Bányász	2,978
13	MTK	2,806
14	Nyíregyháza Spartacus	2,576
15	Nagykanizsa	1,311
16	Pécs	1,156

== See also ==
- 2000–01 Magyar Kupa
- 2000–01 Nemzeti Bajnokság II
- 2000–01 Nemzeti Bajnokság III
