= 1996–97 Nemzeti Bajnokság III =

Nemzeti Bajnokság III
- Season: 1996–97
- Champions: Kiskőrösi FC (Alföld); Büki TK (Bakony); Komlói Bányász SK (Dráva); Dorogi SE (Duna); Dunakeszi VSE (Mátra); Tiszaújvárosi SC (Tisza)
- Promoted: Komlói Bányász SK (Dráva); Dorog SE (Duna); Tiszaújvárosi SC (Tisza)

The 1996–97 Nemzeti Bajnokság III season was the 16th edition of the Nemzeti Bajnokság III.

== League tables ==
=== Alföld group ===
Pos	Team	Pld	W	D	L	GF	GA	GD	Pts	Qualification
1	Kiskőrös FC	26	19	3	4	55	21	+34	60	Advanced to play-offs
2	Kiskunfélegyházai TK	26	16	4	6	50	29	+21	52	
3	Kalocsai FC	26	13	10	3	54	28	+26	49	
4	Szegedi EAC	26	15	3	8	47	27	+20	48	
5	Mélykúti SE	26	14	6	6	42	29	+13	48	
6	Gyula-Kanton FC	26	14	4	8	52	29	+23	46	
7	Békési FC	26	10	6	10	50	44	+6	36	
8	Bajai LSE	26	10	5	11	35	33	+2	35	
9	Makó FC	26	10	3	13	47	45	+2	33	
10	Hódmezővásárhely	26	12	1	13	49	43	+6	31 (Note: 6 points deducted)	
11	Tótkomlósi TC	26	6	6	14	35	58	−23	24	
12	Szarvasi FC	26	5	6	15	45	55	−10	21	
13	Mezőberény FC	26	4	6	16	20	43	−23	18	
14	Szegedi VSE	26	2	1	23	16	113	−97	7	
15	Csont FC (Note: Excluded)	0	0	0	0	0	0	0	0	
16	Kunbaja (Note: Withdrew)	0	0	0	0	0	0	0	0	

=== Bakony group ===
Pos	Team	Pld	W	D	L	GF	GA	GD	Pts	Qualification
1	Büki TK-Gyógyfürdő Rt.	30	21	5	4	62	18	+44	68	Advanced to play-offs
2	MOTIM TE	30	19	4	7	52	33	+19	61	
3	Hévíz SK	30	17	6	7	64	37	+27	57	
4	Sárvári FC	30	16	8	6	47	25	+22	56	
5	Royal Speed-Zalaapáti SE	30	16	7	7	58	34	+24	55	
6	Petőházi Cukorgyári SE	30	16	7	7	47	25	+22	55	
7	Csornai SE	30	15	6	9	51	39	+12	51	
8	Lenti TE-Honvéd Bottyán SE	30	8	15	7	40	34	+6	39	
9	Soproni VSE	30	10	7	13	49	57	−8	37	
10	Körmend-Pumtex	30	10	7	13	35	49	−14	37	
11	Szentgotthárdi MSE	30	10	4	16	49	52	−3	34	
12	Linde SE Répcelak	30	8	8	14	38	55	−17	32	
13	Tapolcai Bauxit SE	30	8	6	16	30	62	−32	30	
14	Győr-Ménfőcsanak	30	9	2	19	31	53	−22	29	
15	Pápai ELC	30	5	5	20	39	68	−29	20	
16	Betka- MÁV DAC	30	1	5	24	18	69	−51	8	

=== Dráva group ===
Pos	Team	Pld	W	D	L	GF	GA	GD	Pts	Relegation
1	Komlói Bányász SK	30	19	8	3	56	21	+35	65	
2	Györkönyi SE	30	17	10	3	76	26	+50	58 (Note: 3 points deducted)	
3	Dunaszentgyörgy-Limex SE	30	16	10	4	58	29	+29	58	
4	Beremendi Építők	30	17	7	6	54	29	+25	58	
5	Balatonlelle	30	15	5	10	45	26	+19	50	
6	Pécsi Postás	30	10	12	8	41	38	+3	42	
7	Paksi SE	30	11	8	11	53	38	+15	41	
8	UFC Szekszárd	30	10	9	11	52	42	+10	39	
9	Pécsi VSK	30	10	9	11	49	46	+3	39	
10	Felsőszentmártoni Zrínyi SE (Note: due to financial reasons the club started the next season in Megyei Bajnokság I)	30	10	8	12	34	41	−7	38	Relegation to Megyei Bajnokság I
11	Bonyhádi FC	30	9	5	16	27	58	−31	32	
12	Marcali VSE	30	8	7	15	48	65	−17	31	
13	Dunaszekcsői SE	30	9	4	17	37	74	−37	31	
14	Bátaszéki SE	30	7	8	15	30	52	−22	29	
15	Gerjeni Medosz SE	30	6	6	18	33	71	−38	24	Relegation to Megyei Bajnokság I
16	Kaposfüredi VSC	30	5	6	19	27	64	−37	21	

=== Duna group ===
Pos	Team	Pld	W	D	L	GF	GA	GD	Pts	QP
1	Dorogi SE	30	19	7	4	50	16	+34	70 (Note: 6 bonus points?)	Advanced to play-offs Promotion to Nemzeti Bajnokság II
2	Komáromi FC	30	18	8	4	69	32	+37	62	
3	Csákvár FC	30	18	7	5	69	29	+40	61	
4	Elektromos	30	17	6	7	50	35	+15	57	
5	Győri Dózsa-Horváth Gumi	30	16	6	8	52	33	+19	54	
6	Pénzügyőr SE	30	16	4	10	49	34	+15	52	
7	ESMTK	30	13	9	8	46	46	0	48	
8	Taksony-Desta SE	30	13	6	11	39	31	+8	45	
9	LRI-Malév	30	10	7	13	36	42	−6	37	
10	Kistarcsai SC	30	10	5	15	32	37	−5	35	
11	Adonyi Petőfi	30	7	9	14	30	49	−19	30	
12	Velencei SE	30	7	8	15	39	65	−26	29	
13	Szigetszentmiklósi TK	30	11	6	13	42	48	−6	27 (Note: 12 points deducted)	
14	Dömsödi SE	30	6	4	20	34	65	−31	22	
15	Tihanyi Petőfi	30	5	6	19	30	64	−34	21	
16	Magyar Viscosa Nyergesújfalu	30	2	6	22	14	55	−41	12	

=== Mátra group ===
Pos	Team	Pld	W	D	L	GF	GA	GD	Pts	Qualification
1	Dunakeszi VSE	30	22	4	4	73	20	+53	70	Advanced to play-offs
2	Rákospalotai EAC	30	20	4	6	63	26	+37	64	
3	Füzesabony	30	19	4	7	55	31	+24	61	
4	Palotás SE	30	16	6	8	58	35	+23	54	
5	Jászberényi SE	30	14	6	10	41	29	+12	48	
6	Besenyőtelek	30	13	8	9	47	33	+14	47	
7	Újszász KSK	30	12	8	10	48	33	+15	44	
8	Monor-Ecker Likőrgyár	30	11	8	11	52	43	+9	41	
9	Selypi Kinizsi	30	12	5	13	58	56	+2	41	
10	Pásztó-Hasznos FC	30	10	10	10	26	31	−5	40	
11	Szécsényi VSE	30	9	8	13	33	48	−15	35	
12	Multi Rocco	30	9	6	15	28	49	−21	33	
13	Gödöllői LC	30	8	7	15	45	52	−7	31	
14	Dreher Sörgyár SE	30	7	4	19	37	62	−25	25	
15	Gyöngyösi AK	30	6	5	19	28	71	−43	23	
16	Kisújszállási SE	30	5	1	24	22	95	−73	16	

=== Tisza group ===
Pos	Team	Pld	W	D	L	GF	GA	GD	Pts	QP
1	Tiszaújvárosi SC	30	19	7	4	60	27	+33	64	Advanced to play-offs Promotion to Nemzeti Bajnokság II
2	Demecseri Kinizsi	30	19	6	5	54	28	+26	63	
3	Nyírbátori FC	30	14	9	7	48	30	+18	51	
4	Borsod Volán	30	14	8	8	39	35	+4	50	
5	Mezőkövesdi SE	30	15	4	11	52	40	+12	49	
6	Baktalórántházi SE	30	14	5	11	63	37	+26	47	
7	Ózdi FC	30	15	2	13	35	40	−5	47	
8	Kisvárda SE	30	12	7	11	48	35	+13	43	
9	Rakamazi Spartacus	30	11	10	9	34	33	+1	43	
10	Mádi KSE	30	11	5	14	47	39	+8	38	
11	Balmazújvárosi FC	30	7	13	10	39	45	−6	34	
12	Karcag-Joma SE	30	9	7	14	49	58	−9	34	
13	Miskolci VSC	30	8	8	14	38	37	+1	32	
14	Nagykállói SE	30	6	11	13	29	42	−13	29	
15	Szikszó-SZATEV	30	5	12	13	31	47	−16	27	
16	Mátészalkai MTK	30	2	4	24	18	111	−93	10	

== Promotion play-off ==
Team 1	Match 1	Match 2	Team 2
Komlói Bányász SK (promoted)	2–0	2–4	Büki TK
Dunakeszi VSE	1–1	0–0	Dorogi SE (promoted)
Kiskőrösi FC	0–1	1–2	Tiszaújvárosi SC (promoted)

== See also ==
- 1996–97 Magyar Kupa
- 1996–97 Nemzeti Bajnokság I
- 1996–97 Nemzeti Bajnokság II
