= 2007–08 Nemzeti Bajnokság II =

Nemzeti Bajnokság II
- Season: 2007–08
- Champions: Szombathely (West); Kecskemét (East)
- Promoted: Szombathely (West); Kecskemét (East)
- Relegated: Komlói Bányász (West); Soroksár (West); Mosonmagyaróvár (West); Orosháza (East); Tuzsér (East); Mezőkövesd (East)
- All statistics correct as of 15 July 2008.

The 2007–08 Nemzeti Bajnokság II was Hungary's the 110th season of the Nemzeti Bajnokság II, the second tier of the Hungarian football league system.

== League table ==
=== Western group ===
| Pos | Team | Pld | W | D | L | GF | GA | GD | Pts | Promotion or relegation |
|---|---|---|---|---|---|---|---|---|---|---|
| 1 | Haladás (P) | 30 | 21 | 8 | 1 | 68 | 19 | +49 | 71 | Promotion to Nemzeti Bajnokság I |
| 2 | Felcsút | 30 | 20 | 6 | 4 | 61 | 25 | +36 | 66 | |
| 3 | Gyirmót | 30 | 17 | 7 | 6 | 66 | 38 | +28 | 58 | |
| 4 | Pápa | 30 | 15 | 11 | 4 | 40 | 26 | +14 | 56 | |
| 5 | Integrál-DAC | 30 | 15 | 4 | 11 | 56 | 43 | +13 | 49 | |
| 6 | Pécs | 30 | 14 | 6 | 10 | 46 | 34 | +12 | 48 | |
| 7 | Kozármisleny | 30 | 8 | 16 | 6 | 31 | 29 | +2 | 40 | |
| 8 | Budaörs | 30 | 9 | 12 | 9 | 47 | 44 | +3 | 39 | |
| 9 | Dunaújváros | 30 | 11 | 5 | 14 | 39 | 47 | −8 | 38 | |
| 10 | Barcs | 30 | 10 | 7 | 13 | 38 | 43 | −5 | 37 | |
| 11 | Kaposvölgye | 30 | 8 | 10 | 12 | 45 | 44 | +1 | 34 | |
| 12 | Ajka | 30 | 8 | 9 | 13 | 52 | 52 | 0 | 33 | |
| 13 | Erzsébeti Spartacus | 30 | 8 | 5 | 17 | 36 | 60 | −24 | 29 | |
| 14 | Komlói Bányász (R) | 30 | 6 | 8 | 16 | 28 | 64 | −36 | 26 | Relegation to Nemzeti Bajnokság III |
| 15 | Soroksár (R) | 30 | 3 | 8 | 19 | 22 | 50 | −28 | 17 | Relegation to Nemzeti Bajnokság III |
| 16 | Mosonmagyaróvár (R) | 30 | 3 | 6 | 21 | 18 | 75 | −57 | 15 | Relegation to Nemzeti Bajnokság III |

Source: Hungarian Football Federation (in Hungarian), Soccerway
Rules for classification: 1) Points; 2) Matches won; 3) Goal difference; 4) Goals scored; 5) Head-to-head points; 6) Head-to-head goal difference; 7) Head-to-head away goals scored; 8) Fair play ranking; 9) Drawing of lots.
(P) Promoted; (R) Relegated

=== Eastern group ===
| Pos | Team | Pld | W | D | L | GF | GA | GD | Pts | Promotion or relegation |
|---|---|---|---|---|---|---|---|---|---|---|
| 1 | Kecskemét (P) | 30 | 24 | 3 | 3 | 74 | 23 | +51 | 75 | Promotion to Nemzeti Bajnokság I |
| 2 | Szolnok | 30 | 20 | 3 | 7 | 52 | 29 | +23 | 63 | |
| 3 | Ferencváros | 30 | 18 | 8 | 4 | 65 | 35 | +30 | 62 | |
| 4 | Makó | 30 | 13 | 11 | 6 | 52 | 34 | +18 | 50 | |
| 5 | Vác | 30 | 13 | 6 | 11 | 57 | 45 | +12 | 45 | |
| 6 | Vecsés | 30 | 12 | 9 | 9 | 43 | 42 | +1 | 45 | |
| 7 | Kazincbarcika | 30 | 11 | 11 | 8 | 43 | 41 | +2 | 44 | |
| 8 | Bőcs | 30 | 11 | 9 | 10 | 47 | 42 | +5 | 42 | |
| 9 | Jászberény | 30 | 9 | 9 | 12 | 28 | 36 | −8 | 36 | |
| 10 | Cegléd | 30 | 10 | 5 | 15 | 33 | 53 | −20 | 35 | |
| 11 | Baktalórántháza | 30 | 8 | 10 | 12 | 31 | 43 | −12 | 34 | |
| 12 | Tököl | 30 | 9 | 5 | 16 | 28 | 52 | −24 | 32 | |
| 13 | BKV | 30 | 8 | 5 | 17 | 43 | 49 | −6 | 29 | |
| 14 | Orosháza (R) | 30 | 7 | 8 | 15 | 41 | 56 | −15 | 29 | Relegation to Nemzeti Bajnokság III |
| 15 | Tuzsér Erdért SE (R) | 30 | 6 | 5 | 19 | 29 | 59 | −30 | 23 | Relegation to Nemzeti Bajnokság III |
| 16 | Mezőkövesd (R) | 30 | 4 | 7 | 19 | 26 | 51 | −25 | 19 | Relegation to Nemzeti Bajnokság III |

Source: Hungarian Football Federation (in Hungarian), Soccerway
Rules for classification: 1) Points; 2) Matches won; 3) Goal difference; 4) Goals scored; 5) Head-to-head points; 6) Head-to-head goal difference; 7) Head-to-head away goals scored; 8) Fair play ranking; 9) Drawing of lots.
(P) Promoted; (R) Relegated

== See also ==
- 2007–08 Magyar Kupa
- 2007–08 Nemzeti Bajnokság I
- 2007–08 Nemzeti Bajnokság III
