= Balkány SE =

Hungarian football club

Balkányi Sport Egyesület
- Full name: Balkány SE
- Founded: 1905
- Ground: Sport utca
- League: Megyei Bajnokság I
- Website: https://balkanyise.hu/
Home colours

Balkányi Sport Egyesület is a professional football club based in Balkány, Szabolcs–Szatmár–Bereg County, Hungary.

== History ==
Balkány SE won the Tisza group of the 2006–07 Nemzeti Bajnokság III season; however, did not gain promotion to the second division.

== Name changes ==
- Balkányi SE: ? – ?
- Balkányi Törekvés SE: ? – ?
- Balkányi MSE: ? – 1949
- Balkányi TSE: 1949 – 1950
- Balkányi EPOSz: 1950 – 1950
- Balkányi Állami Gazdaság DSE: 1950 – 1951
- Balkányi ÁGSK: 1951 – 1953
- Balkányi Traktor: 1953 – 1957
- Balkányi Hunyadi: 1957 – 1957
- Balkányi MEDOSZ: 1957 – ?
- Balkányi Sport Egyesület: ? – 2015
- Cellspan-Balkányi Sport Egyesület: 2015 – 2018
- Balkányi Sport Egyesület: 2018 – present

== Honours ==
=== League ===
- Nemzeti Bajnokság III:
  - Winners (1): 2006–07

== Seasons ==
As of 18 October 2026.

Season	Tier	Club's name	Position	Pts
1945	2	Balkányi Törekvés	0 / 7	
1945–46	3	Balkányi Törekvés	5 / 8	13
1946–47	3	Balkányi Törekvés SE	4 / 11	24
1947–48	3	Balkányi Törekvés SE	3 / 13	33
1948–49	3	Balkányi TSE (Balkányi MSE)	12 / 16	22
1949–50	3	Balkányi ÁGDSE (Balkányi EPOSz)	10 / 16	27
1950	3	Balkányi ÁGDSE	6 / 17	15
1951	3	Balkányi ÁGSK	9 / 14	25
1952	3	Balkányi ÁGSK	8 / 14	26
1953	3	Balkányi Traktor	8 / 14	26
1954	3	Balkányi Traktor	4 / 13	30
1955	3	Balkányi Traktor	7 / 16	31
1956	3	Balkányi Traktor	3 / 16	32
1957	3	Balkányi Hunyadi	3 / 6	11
1957–58	3	Balkányi MEDOSZ	11 / 16	28
1958–59	4	Balkányi MEDOSz	5 / 16	38
1959–60	4	Balkányi MEDOSZ	8 / 16	33
1960–61	4	Balkányi MEDOSZ	5 / 18	36
1961–62	4	Balkányi MEDOSZ	6 / 16	29
1962–63	4	Balkányi MEDOSZ	9 / 16	26
1963	5	Balkányi MEDOSZ	7 / 18	16
1964	5	Balkányi MEDOSZ SE	6 / 18	35
1965	5	Balkányi MEDOSZ	2 / 17	35
1966	5	Balkányi MEDOSZ	8 / 18	34
1967	5	Balkányi MEDOSZ	15 / 16	19
1968	6	Balkány	1 / 14	43
1969	5	Balkányi MEDOSZ	13 / 16	26
1970	5	Balkányi MEDOSZ	4 / 8	14
1970–71	5	Balkányi MEDOSZ	10 / 16	26
1971–72	5	Balkányi MEDOSZ	8 / 16	30
1972–73	5	Balkányi MEDOSZ	14 / 16	24
1973–74	5	Balkányi MEDOSZ	13 / 16	27
1974–75	5	Balkányi MEDOSZ	4 / 16	32
1975–76	5	Balkányi MEDOSZ	6 / 16	33
1976–77	5	Balkányi MEDOSZ	2 / 16	39
1977–78	4	Balkányi MEDOSZ	13 / 16	26
1978–79	3	Balkányi MEDOSZ	12 / 16	26
1979–80	3	Balkányi MEDOSZ	8 / 16	30
1980–81	3	Balkányi MEDOSZ	16 / 16	18
1981–82	5	Balkány	2 / 16	47
1982–83	5	Balkány	2 / 15	44
1983–84	5	Balkányi MEDOSZ SE	1 / 13	36
1984–85	5	Balkány	2 / 14	37
1985–86	5	Balkány	8 / 16	29
1986–87	5	Balkány	4 / 16	38
1987–88	5	Balkányi MEDOSZ SE	16 / 16	16
1988–89	6	Balkány	1 / 12	36
1989–90	6	Balkány	1 / 11	45
1990–91	6	Balkány	2 / 12	40
1991–92	6	Balkány	3 / 17	33
1992–93	6	Balkány	3 / 12	33
1993–94	6	Balkány	2 / 14	45
1994–95	5	Balkány	6 / 14	35
1995–96	5	Balkány	6 / 14	37
1996–97	5	Balkányi MEDOSZ SE	7 / 16	44
1997–98	6	Balkány	11 / 16	38
1998–99	6	Balkányi MEDOSZ SE	12 / 16	32
1999–00	6	Balkány SE	4 / 16	53
2000–01	6	Balkány	2 / 16	64
2001–02	6	Balkány	6 / 16	51
2002–03	6	Balkány SE	6 / 14	43
2003–04	6	Balkány	1 / 16	80
2004–05	5	Balkány	1 / 16	61
2005–06	3	Balkányi SE	4 / 16	64
2006–07	3	Balkányi SE	1 / 14	63
2007–08	3	Balkányi SE	13 / 16	28
2008–09	3	Balkányi SE	13 / 16	33
2009–10	3	Balkányi SE	8 / 14	34
2010–11	3	Balkányi SE	15 / 16	16
2011–12	4	Balkányi SE	12 / 16	33
2012–13	4	Balkányi SE	8 / 16	47
2013–14	4	Balkányi SE	3 / 16	59
2014–15	4	Balkányi SE	15 / 16	15
2015–16	5	Cellspan-Balkány SE	1 / 16	88
2016–17	4	Balkányi SE	1 / 16	69
2017–18	4	Cellspan-Balkány SE	6 / 16	47
2018–19	4	Balkányi SE	8 / 16	41
2019–20	4	Balkány SE	10 / 16	24
2020–21	4	Balkány SE	12 / 16	29
2021–22	4	Balkány SE	7 / 16	44
2022–23	4	Balkány SE	14 / 16	24
2023–24	5	Balkány SE	9 / 14	32
2024–25	5	Balkány SE	11 / 13	18
2025–26	5	Balkány SE	9 / 11	12
