= Dunakeszi VSE =

Hungarian football club

- Full name: Dunakeszi Városi Sportegyesület
- Founded: 1949
- Ground: Kinizsi Sportpálya
- League: Megyei Bajnokság I
- Website: https://vsdunakeszi.hu/
Home colours

Dunakeszi Városi Sportegyesület is a professional football club based in Dunakeszi, Pest County, Hungary, that competes in the Megyei Bajnokság I, the fourth tier of Hungarian football.

== History ==
The team was founded in 1926 and, until the communist takeover in 1948, competed under the name Dunakeszi Magyarság, by which it became widely known. From 1948 on, it was registered as Dunakeszi Vasutas, but the name “Magyarság” remained in common usage and briefly returned as the official name.

The early years brought unexpected successes: first a third-division championship title (1928), followed by two second-division silver medals (1929, 1930), a second-division bronze medal (1932), and finally two second-division gold medals (1931, 1933) were added to the club's list of honors. In 1931, Dunakeszi won the lower division championship ahead of four teams from Vác, and then went on to defeat Rákoscsaba and Szolnoki MÁV in the district championship playoffs. In the national semifinals, they were ultimately defeated by Tatabánya (4–1). In 1933, they once again competed in the national amateur championship, but were eliminated in the quarterfinals by Pécsi VSK (3–0).

Until 1938, they were a mid-table team in the second division, but then they were relegated to the third division for two years. From there, after winning a silver medal, they eventually returned to the second division by winning the championship (1940).

During the war years, they won three bronze medals, but as a result of reorganizations, they were forced to drop back to the third division again in 1946. In the following years, they were considered a team hovering between the second and third divisions; this period came to an end when the team was nationalized: the Ministry of Metallurgy and Mechanical Engineering took over management of the team from MÁV. Around this time, the Hungarian national team also paid a visit to Dunakeszi: the national team scored 11 goals against the Dunakeszi team (April 26, 1950). From that point on, they rapidly plummeted down the ranks: by 1955, they had been relegated to the fourth division. Although they did finish third twice in that division, position, but in 1958 they were relegated to the fifth division after all. There, they won a league title (1960), but were unable to secure promotion, having failed in three promotion playoffs between 1958 and 1961. In fact, as a result of league reorganizations, Vasutas found itself in the sixth division in 1963. During these years, they often competed against their city rival, Dunakeszi Kinizsi, for lower-division league titles and medals. In 1964, they claimed the top spot in the sixth division, earning promotion back to the fifth division. From there, they managed to move up again in 1968 by winning a league title. They won two bronze medals there, and then secured their place in the third division with another league title in 1973. Aside from one third-place finish, they were generally a mid-table team; however, thanks to league reorganization, an 11th-place finish in 1978 was enough to earn promotion to the second division. They spent two years there, with little success. They faced teams such as BVSC, BKV, Kecskemét, Pénzügyőr, and Dunaújváros, but were unable to keep up with the pace, so in the fall of 1980, they found themselves back in the third division.

They moved back and forth between the third and fourth divisions in line with the reorganization, with two fourth-division gold medals from 1984 and 1987 being particularly noteworthy achievements. Following that last victory, they stabilized their position in the middle of the third division standings; then, in the mid-1990s, they won a silver medal, and in 1997, they also claimed the league title. They faced Dorog in the promotion playoff; the match in Dunakeszi ended 1–1, while no goals were scored in the miners’ town, so Dunakeszi did not advance to the second division. In the fall of 1997, they hosted Haladás in the Hungarian Cup, and although they led 1-0 at halftime, the visitors ultimately prevailed (2-1). In the fall of 1998, they defeated Tiszaújváros 1–0 in the round of 32 of the cup, but lost to top-division Vác 2–1 in the quarterfinals. In 1999, a promotion playoff was no longer necessary: winning the Mátra Group again secured promotion to the second division. Vasutas spent one year in the second division, then known as NB I; they finished in 9th place in the 20-team league, yet they were still relegated to the fourth division. They faced Videoton, Kecskemét, REAC, BVSC, BKV, the 3rd District, Kaposvár, Békéscsaba, Szolnok, Szeged, and Sopron, and not only did they defeat more than one of these teams, but they also finished ahead of some of them in the standings. They drew with Videoton, Sopron, and Kaposvár, but defeated Pécs and Kecskemét, and beat Csepel in both home and away matches. They also recorded a few high-scoring victories (3–0 against Tiszaújváros, 4–0 against Érd). They slipped back a bit toward the end of the season but still finished in the middle of the pack.

From that point on, they became regular participants in NB III, a league that was first classified as the fourth division and then, starting in 2005, as the third division. They were forced to spend a year in the county's top division, but immediately returned with a league title (2009). That same year, they also reached the final of the Pest County Super Cup: Verőce-Dunakeszi Vasutas 3–2.

In 2005, in the Hungarian Cup national bracket, they hosted Vasas in the round of 64 and lost 2–1. In the final years of the team's existence, it once again competed in the lower ranks of NB III, but was unable to come close to medal positions; in fact, they were kept in the league on several occasions despite being in the relegation zone. The most interesting situation arose in 2010: RAFC and Ózd were tied at 19 points after the final round, while Dunakeszi had 18 points. However, Vasutas still had a postponed match against Gyöngyös. RAFC and Ózd nevertheless declared themselves safe from relegation, with both clubs even publishing the information on their own websites. The situation was ultimately resolved so that all three teams could retain their NB III status.

Imre Lebonicki and György Katona—who later played for the national team—both started their careers in Dunakeszi, as did Tamás Egerszegi today. Imre Bíró and András Telek also played here at some point during their careers. In the fall of 2011, Dunakeszi did not even field a team against Letkés, which was competing three divisions below them in the PMK. On August 8, 2012, the Budapest Regional Court issued a final ruling ordering the compulsory liquidation of the club.

Dunakeszi won the 1996–97 Nemzeti Bajnokság III season. However, the club lost the promotion play-off against Dorogi FC on away goals (1-1 and 0-0); therefore, the club was not promoted to the second division.

In the 1998–99 Nemzeti Bajnokság III season, Dunakeszi finished in the first place and were promoted to the second division.

Dunakeszi finished in the ninth position in the 1999–2000 Nemzeti Bajnokság II season (at that time it was called Nemzeti Bajnokság I). However, the club was relegated to the third tier.

== Name changes ==
- 1914–1950: Alagi Sport Club:
- In 1950, Alagot was annexed by Dunakeszi
- 1950–1951: Dunakeszi ÉDOSz
- In 1951 merged with Dunakeszi SE
- 1951–1970: Dunakeszi Kinizsi SK
- 1970–1998: Dunakeszi SE
- 1998–?: Dunakeszi Kinizsi SE
- ?–2013: Dunakeszi Kinizsi FC
- 2013 gave the rights to Vác FC and participated with the rights of Vácrátóti KSE
- 2013–2016: Dunakeszi Kinizsi Utánpótlás Sportegyesület
- 2016–present: Városi Sportegyesület Dunakeszi

== Honours ==
=== League ===
- Nemzeti Bajnokság III:
  - Winners (2): 1996–97, 1998–99

== Seasons ==
The highest league that Dunakeszi VSE have ever played was the second division.

| Season | Tier | Club's name | Position | Pts |
|---|---|---|---|---|
| 1927–28 | 3 | Dunakeszi Magyarság SE | 1 / 9 | 23 |
| 1928–29 | 2 | Dunakeszi Magyarság SE | 2 / 12 | 34 |
| 1929–30 | 2 | Dunakeszi Magyarság SE | 2 / 10 | 25 |
| 1930–31 | 2 | Dunakeszi Magyarság SE | 1 / 10 | 33 |
| 1931–32 | 2 | Dunakeszi Magyarság SE | 3 / 11 | 27 |
| 1932–33 | 2 | Dunakeszi Magyarság | 1 / 14 | 41 |
| 1933–34 | 2 | Dunakeszi Magyarság SE | 6 / 12 | 21 |
| 1934–35 | 2 | Dunakeszi Magyarság | 4 / 12 | 31 |
| 1935–36 | 2 | Dunakeszi Magyarság | 6 / 12 | 23 |
| 1936–37 | 2 | Dunakeszi Magyarság SE | 4 / 12 | 29 |
| 1937–38 | 2 | Dunakeszi Magyarság SE | 7 / 12 | 22 |
| 1938–39 | 3 | Dunakeszi Magyarság | 2 / 12 | 32 |
| 1939–40 | 3 | Dunakeszi Magyarság | 1 / 12 | 39 |
| 1940–41 | 2 | Dunakeszi Magyarság SE | 6 / 14 | 26 |
| 1941–42 | 2 | Dunakeszi Magyarság SE | 5 / 14 | 31 |
| 1942–43 | 2 | Dunakeszi Magyarság | 7 / 14 | 23 |
| 1943–44 | 2 | Dunakeszi Magyarság | 5 / 14 | 28 |
| 1944–45 | 2 | Dunakeszi Magyarság | 3 / 16 | 15 |
| 1944–45 | 2 | Dunakeszi Magyarság | 0 / 11 | |
| 1945 | 2 | Dunakeszi MÁV Magyarság | 3 / 12 | 32 |
| 1945–46 | 2 | Dunakeszi Magyarság | 3 / 14 | 35 |
| 1946–47 | 3 | Dunakeszi Magyarság | 2 / 16 | 32 |
| 1947–48 | 2 | Dunakeszi Magyarság | 9 / 14 | 27 |
| 1948–49 | 2 | Dunakeszi VSE | 16 / 16 | 18 |
| 1949–50 | 3 | Dunakeszi Vasutas SK | 2 / 16 | 44 |
| 1950 | 2 | Dunakeszi VSK | 14 / 16 | 11 |
| 1951 | 3 | Dunakeszi Lokomotív | 1 / 14 | 40 |
| 1952 | 2 | Dunakeszi Vagongyári Vasas | 17 / 18 | 17 |
| 1953 | 3 | Dunakeszi Vasas | 9 / 16 | 26 |
| 1954 | 3 | Dunakeszi Vasas | 15 / 16 | 15 |
| 1955 | 4 | Dunakeszi Vasas | 3 / 14 | 34 |
| 1956 | 4 | Dunakeszi VSE | 0 / 9 | |
| 1957 | 4 | Dunakeszi Vasas | 3 / 9 | 17 |
| 1957–58 | 4 | Dunakeszi Magyarság | 13 / 16 | 24 |
| 1958–59 | 5 | Dunakeszi Magyarság | 3 / 13 | 26 |
| 1959–60 | 5 | Dunakeszi Magyarság | 2 / 13 | 38 |
| 1960–61 | 5 | Dunakeszi Vasutas SE | 1 / 14 | 42 |
| 1961–62 | 5 | Dunakeszi Vasutas | 4 / 13 | 29 |
| 1962–63 | 5 | Dunakeszi VSE | 2 / 14 | 37 |
| 1963 | 6 | Dunakeszi VSE | 4 / 14 | 15 |
| 1964 | 6 | Dunakeszi Vasutas | 1 / 14 | 43 |
| 1965 | 5 | Dunakeszi Vasutas SE | 9 / 16 | 29 |
| 1966 | 5 | Dunakeszi Vasutas SE | 15 / 16 | 21 |
| 1967 | 6 | Dunakeszi VSE | 1 / 14 | 38 |
| 1968 | 5 | Dunakeszi Vasutas SE | 1 / 16 | 47 |
| 1969 | 4 | Dunakeszi VSE | 5 / 16 | 33 |
| 1970 | 4 | Dunakeszi VSE | 4 / 16 | 19 |
| 1970–71 | 4 | Dunakeszi VSE | 3 / 16 | 35 |
| 1971–72 | 4 | Dunakeszi VSE | 3 / 16 | 37 |
| 1972–73 | 4 | Dunakeszi VSE | 1 / 16 | 47 |
| 1973–74 | 3 | Dunakeszi VSE | 8 / 16 | 30 |
| 1974–75 | 3 | Dunakeszi VSE | 7 / 20 | 37 |
| 1975–76 | 3 | Dunakeszi VSE | 9 / 19 | 36 |
| 1976–77 | 3 | Dunakeszi VSE | 3 / 20 | 47 |
| 1977–78 | 3 | Dunakeszi VSE | 11 / 20 | 41 |
| 1978–79 | 2 | Dunakeszi VSE | 17 / 19 | 26 |
| 1979–80 | 2 | Dunakeszi VSE | 18 / 20 | 31 |
| 1980–81 | 3 | Dunakeszi Vasutas SE | 7 / 18 | 37 |
| 1981–82 | 4 | Dunakeszi Vasutas SE | 1 / 16 | 45 |
| 1982–83 | 3 | Dunakeszi VSE | 16 / 18 | 23 |
| 1983–84 | 4 | Dunakeszi VSE | 10 / 16 | 29 |
| 1984–85 | 4 | Dunakeszi VSE | 4 / 16 | 44 |
| 1985–86 | 4 | Dunakeszi VSE | 5 / 16 | 34 |
| 1986–87 | 4 | Dunakeszi VSE | 1 / 16 | 44 |
| 1987–88 | 3 | Dunakeszi Vasutas SE | 14 / 18 | 22 |
| 1988–89 | 3 | Dunakeszi VSE | 6 / 16 | 46 |
| 1989–90 | 3 | Dunakeszi Vasutas SE | 10 / 16 | 35 |
| 1990–91 | 3 | Diadém Dunakeszi Vasutas SE | 11 / 16 | 27 |
| 1991–92 | 3 | Dunakeszi | 5 / 16 | 35 |
| 1992–93 | 3 | Dunakeszi VSE | 7 / 16 | 36 |
| 1993–94 | 3 | Dunakeszi VSE | 5 / 16 | 34 |
| 1994–95 | 3 | Dunakeszi VSE | 2 / 16 | 61 |
| 1995–96 | 3 | Dunakeszi VSE | 6 / 16 | 46 |
| 1996–97 | 3 | Dunakeszi VSE | 1 / 16 | 70 |
| 1997–98 | 3 | Dunakeszi VSE | 3 / 16 | 48 |
| 1998–99 | 3 | Dunakeszi MÁV Adtrans | 1 / 16 | 55 |
| 1999–00 | 2 | ADtranz Dunakeszi VSE | 9 / 20 | 58 |
| 2000–01 | 4 | Dunakeszi | 5 / 12 | 35 |
| 2001–02 | 4 | Dunakeszi VSE | 11 / 16 | 36 |
| 2002–03 | 4 | Dunakeszi VSE | 5 / 16 | 46 |
| 2003–04 | 4 | Dunakeszi | 7 / 16 | 45 |
| 2004–05 | 4 | Dunakeszi | 6 / 15 | 47 |
| 2005–06 | 3 | Dunakeszi Vasutas SE | 5 / 18 | 58 |
| 2006–07 | 3 | Dunakeszi VSE | 7 / 14 | 38 |
| 2007–08 | 3 | Dunakeszi Vasutas SE | 15 / 16 | 31 |
| 2008–09 | 4 | Dunakeszi Vasutas SE | 1 / 16 | 69 |
| 2009–10 | 3 | Dunakeszi Vasutas SE | 14 / 14 | 18 |
| 2010–11 | 3 | Dunakeszi Vasutas SE | 14 / 16 | 29 |
| 2011–12 | 3 | Dunakeszi Vasutas SE | 7 / 15 | 44 |
