= Tuzsér SE =

Hungarian football club

- Full name: Tuzsér Sportegyesület
- Founded: 1948
- Ground: Lónyay Kastélykerti pálya
Home colours

Tuzsér Sportegyesület is a professional football club based in Tuzsér, Szabolcs–Szatmár–Bereg County, Hungary.

== History ==
Tuzsér SE was founded in 1948 and, until the 1960s, competed primarily in district leagues.

The small team’s “rise” truly began after the establishment of the Erdért company, which became a significant financial backer. From the 1960s through the late 1980s, the team primarily competed in the county’s first division (Megyei Bajnokság I), though it also made several appearances in Nemzeti Bajnokság III.

The club’s most renowned players emerged in the 1960s and 1970s—to name a few: Béla Hegedűs played for Vasas SC, Sándor Márta for Tatabánya SC, and Gyula Maczkó for DMVSC in the top division. During the so-called “golden age,” the team was renamed Tuzsér Erdért-Medosz SE.

The club experienced its greatest crisis from the late 1980s through 1997, when the team competed in the county’s second division. At that time, financial support came almost exclusively from the local government. During this period, the team’s name reverted to Tuzsér Sports Club.

Starting in 1997, the club began to thrive once more. In 1997, the green-and-white team advanced to the county’s first division through a promotion playoff, and in 2001, it reached the Nemzeti Bajnokság III. In the 2003–04 Magyar Kupa, Tuzsér SE reached the quarterfinals, and a year later, the club celebrated their first Nemzeti Bajnokság III championship title. Despite this, the team was unable to advance to the second division because it lost the promotion playoff to Putnok VSE. It’s worth noting that the winner of that matchup also did not compete in the second division later on, citing financial reasons.

== Name changes ==
- Tuzséri MSE: ? - 1947
- Tuzséri FM SE: 1947 - 1948
- Tuzséri FSz SE: 1948 - ?
- Tuzsér Sportegyesület: ? - 1961
- Tuzséri ERDÉRT MEDOSZ SE: 1961 - ?
- Tuzséri ERDÉRT SE: ? - 1997
- Tuzsér Sportegyesület: 1997 -

== Honours ==
=== League ===
- Nemzeti Bajnokság III:
  - Winners (1): 2005–06

== Seasons ==
The table below shows the seasons of Tuzsér SE.

Season	Tier	Club's name	Position	Pts
1946–47	4	Tuzséri MSE	5 / 6	6
1947–48	4	Tuzséri FMSE	7 / 11	10
1948–49	4	Tuzséri FSz SE	13 / 14	17
1949–50	5	Tuzséri FSz SE	6 / 7	-
1957–58	5	Tuzséri KISz	4 / 12	25
1958–59	5	Tuzsér	1 / 12	6
1959–60	5	Tuzsér	12 / 14	20
1961–62	5	Tuzsér	4 / 12	23
1962–63	5	Tuzsér	4 / 16	33
1963	6	Tuzsér	9 / 11	3
1964	6	Tuzsér	3 / 16	37
1965	6	Tuzséri Erdért MEDOSZ	2 / 16	41
1966	6	Tuzsér	1 / 14	39
1967	5	Tuzséri Erdért MEDOSZ	7 / 16	33
1968	5	Tuzséri Erdért MEDOSZ	1 / 16	42
1969	4	Tuzséri MEDOSZ	7 / 16	32
1970	4	Tuzséri MEDOSZ	4 / 16	20
1970–71	4	Tuzséri MEDOSZ	14 / 16	24
1971–72	4	Tuzséri MEDOSZ	10 / 16	28
1972–73	4	Tuzséri MEDOSZ	13 / 16	25
1973–74	4	Tuzséri MEDOSZ	6 / 16	30
1974–75	3	Tuzséri Medosz Erdért	19 / 20	20
1975–76	4	Tuzséri Erdért MEDOSZ	12 / 16	27
1976–77	4	Tuzséri Erdért MEDOSZ	6 / 16	34
1977–78	4	Tuzséri MEDOSZ	5 / 16	33
1978–79	3	Tuzséri Erdért MEDOSZ	6 / 16	32
1979–80	3	Tuzséri ERDÉRT MEDOSZ	1 / 16	39
1980–81	3	Tuzséri Erdért MEDOSZ SE	7 / 16	33
1981–82	4	Tuzséri Erdért MEDOSZ SE	7 / 18	38
1982–83	4	Tuzséri Erdért MEDOSZ SE	4 / 18	38
1983–84	4	Tuzséri Erdért MEDOSZ SE	11 / 18	32
1984–85	4	Tuzséri Erdért MEDOSZ SE	13 / 18	29
1985–86	4	Tuzséri Erdért MEDOSZ SE	5 / 16	32
1986–87	4	Tuzséri Erdért MEDOSZ SE	8 / 16	27
1987–88	4	Tuzséri Erdért MEDOSZ SE	13 / 16	23
1988–89	4	Tuzséri Erdért MEDOSZ SE	12 / 16	26
1989–90	4	Tuzséri Erdért MEDOSZ SE	16 / 16	20
1990–91	5	Tuzséri Erdért MEDOSZ SE	10 / 16	28
1991–92	5	Tuzséri Erdért MEDOSZ SE	11 / 16	29
1992–93	5	Tuzséri Erdért MEDOSZ SE	6 / 16	34
1993–94	5	Tuzséri Erdért MEDOSZ SE	9 / 16	29
1994–95	5	Tuzsér	7 / 14	33
1995–96	5	Tuzsér	5 / 14	45
1996–97	5	Tuzséri SE	2 / 16	56
1997–98	5	Tuzséri SE	9 / 16	39
1998–99	5	Tuzséri SE	6 / 16	45
1999–00	5	Tuzséri SE	7 / 16	43
2000–01	5	Tuzsér SE	2 / 16	55
2001–02	4	Tuzséri SE	3 / 14	47
2002–03	4	Tuzsér	4 / 16	52
2003–04	4	Tuzsér	3 / 15	54
2004–05	4	Tuzsér Erdért SE	1 / 15	65
2005–06	3	Tuzsér Erdért SE	1 / 16	69
2006–07	2	Tuzsér SE	6 / 16	45
2007–08	2	Tuzsér Erdért SE	15 / 16	23
2008–09	3	Tuzsér SE	12 / 16	34
2009–10	3	Tuzsér SE	10 / 14	33
2010–11	3	Tuzsér SE	9 / 16	40
2011–12	3	Tuzsér SE	15 / 16	17
2012–13	4	Tuzsér SE	4 / 16	50
2013–14	4	Tuzsér SE	7 / 16	52
2014–15	4	Tuzsér SE	1 / 16	66
2015–16	4	Tuzsér SE	6 / 16	44
2016–17	4	Tuzsér SE	13 / 16	32
2017–18	4	Tuzsér SE	12 / 16	33
2018–19	6	Tuzsér SE	1 / 14	65
2019–20	5	Tuzsér SE	8 / 16	20
2020–21	5	Tuzsér SE	7 / 16	47
2021–22	5	Tuzsér SE	7 / 14	34
2022–23	5	Tuzsér SE	11 / 14	19
2023–24	5	Tuzsér SE	11 / 14	24
2024–25	5	Tuzsér SE	3 / 13	46
2025–26	5	Tuzsér SE	6 / 11	20
