= Büki TK =

Hungarian football club

Büki Testedzők Köre
- Full name: Büki Testedzők Köre
- Founded: 1949
- Ground: Büki Sportközpont
- League: Megyei Bajnokság I
- Website: https://bukitk.hu/hu/
Home colours

Büki Testedzők Köre is a professional football club based in Bük, Vas County, Hungary, that competes in the Megyei Bajnokság I, the fourthtier of Hungarian football.

== Name changes ==
- Büki TKE: ? - 1949
- Büki Szakszervezeti TK: 1949 - 1950
- Büki Vasutas SK: 1950 - 1951
- Büki Lokomotív SK: 1951 - 1952
- Büki Községi SK: 1952 - 1953
- Büki Lokomotív SK: 1953 - 1955
- Büki Törekvés: 1955 - 1956
- Büki Traktor SK: 1956 - ?
- Büki TK-Gyógyfürdő Hunguest Hotels: ? - ?
- Lami-Véd Büki Testedzők Köre: 1 January 2007 - 2008
- Büki Testedzők Köre: 2008 -

== Honours ==
=== League ===
- Nemzeti Bajnokság III:
  - Winners (2): 1996–97, 2000–01

== Seasons ==
As of 20 October 2026.

Season	Tier	Club's name	Position	Pts
1946–47	5	Büki TKE	8 / 13	19
1947–48	5	Büki TKE	12 / 14	16
1948–49	5	Büki TKE	0 / 12	
1949–50	5	Büki Szakszervezeti TK	0 / 11	
1950	5	Büki VSK	0 / 10	
1951	4	Büki Lokomotív	0 / 15	
1952	4	Büki Községi SK	11 / 11	11
1953	4	Büki Lokomotív	8 / 11	4
1954	4	Büki Lokomotív	3 / 12	20
1955	4	Büki Törekvés	4 / 14	35
1956	4	Büki TK	7 / 14	24
1957–58	5	Bük	2 / 9	23
1958–59	5	Bük	1 / 10	6
1959–60	5	Bük	2 / 10	25
1960–61	5	Bük	2 / 13	30
1961–62	5	Bük	3 / 8	8
1962–63	5	Bük	8 / 10	
1964	7	Bük	1 / 6	13
1965	6	Bük	6 / 11	20
1966	6	Bük	10 / 14	22
1967	6	Bük	4 / 13	31
1968	6	Bük	6 / 13	25
1969	6	Bük	2 / 14	19
1970	6	Bük	2 / 13	18
1970–71	6	Bük	3 / 14	38
1971–72	6	Bük	8 / 13	21
1972–73	6	Bük	7 / 14	17
1973–74	6	Büki KSK	1 / 14	40
1974–75	5	Bük	1 / 14	44
1975–76	4	Büki KSK	5 / 16	36
1976–77	4	Büki KSK	7 / 16	36
1977–78	4	Büki KSK	12 / 16	26
1978–79	3	Bük	14 / 16	24
1979–80	4	Büki KSK	1 / 14	45
1980–81	3	Büki KSK	10 / 18	32
1981–82	4	Büki KSK	14 / 16	22
1982–83	4	Bük	13 / 16	24
1983–84	4	Bük	15 / 16	11
1984–85	5	Bük	6 / 16	37
1985–86	5	Bük	5 / 14	32
1986–87	5	Bük	2 / 14	26
1987–88	5	Bük	4 / 14	31
1988–89	5	Bük	13 / 14	19
1990–91	5	Bük	10 / 16	26
1991–92	5	Bük	11 / 16	25
1992–93	5	Bük	1 / 16	43
1993–94	4	Bük	2 / 16	51
1994–95	4	Büki TK	1 / 16	76
1995–96	3	Büki TK-Győgyfürdő Rt.	5 / 16	47
1996–97	3	Büki TK-Gyógyfürdő Rt.	1 / 16	68
1997–98	3	Büki TK	12 / 16	37
1998–99	3	Büki TK-Gyógyfürdő Rt.-HH	13 / 16	28
1999–00	3	Büki TK	7 / 16	39
2000	3	Büki TK	1 / 8	31
2000–01	3	Büki TK	1 / 12	51
2001–02	2	Büki TK-Bükfürdő	10 / 12	44
2001–02	2	BTK Bükfürdő	7 / 12	30
2002–03	2	Büki TK-Bükfürdő-HH	3 / 20	60
2003–04	5	Büki TK	13 / 18	39
2004–05	5	Büki TK	1 / 16	75
2005–06	3	Büki TK	7 / 16	48
2006–07	3	Lami-Véd Bük TK	7 / 14	33
2007–08	3	Lami-Véd Bük TK	5 / 18	61
2008–09	3	Büki TK	12 / 16	32
2009–10	3	Büki TK	14 / 14	11
2010–11	3	Büki TK	12 / 16	32
2011–12	4	Büki TK	2 / 16	57
2012–13	4	Büki TK	11 / 16	43
2013–14	4	Büki TK	15 / 16	23
2014–15	4	Büki TK	15 / 16	14
2015–16	5	Büki TK	5 / 14	41
2016–17	5	Büki TK	2 / 12	58
2017–18	5	Büki TK	3 / 10	53
2018–19	5	Büki TK	1 / 16	76
2019–20	4	Büki TK	9 / 16	25
2020–21	4	Büki TK	11 / 17	40
2021–22	4	Büki TK	7 / 16	44
2022–23	4	Büki TK	16 / 16	4
2023–24	4	Büki TK	16 / 16	8
2024–25	5	Büki TK	15 / 16	16
2025–26	5	Büki TK	13 / 15	19
