= Ibrány SE =

Hungarian football club

- Full name: Ibrány Sportegyesület
- Founded: 1949; 76 years ago
- Ground: Vicze János Városi Sportpálya
Home colours	Away colours

Ibrány Sportegyesület is a professional football club based in Ibrány, Szabolcs-Szatmár-Bereg County, Hungary. The club competes in the Szabolcs-Szatmár-Bereg county league.

== Name changes ==
- ?-1948: Ibrányi SE
- 1948–1950: Ibrányi EPOSz
- 1950–1951: Ibrányi DISz
- 1951–?: Ibrányi SK
- ?-?: Ibrányi TSZ
- ?-?: Ibrány Sportegyesület
