= 1948–49 Nemzeti Bajnokság III =

Nemzeti Bajnokság III
- Season: 1948–49
- Champions: Dohánygyári Lendület (Bíró-Dezső); Kisvárdai ÖSE (Debrecen-Nyíregyháza); Soproni FAC (Győr-Szombathely); Magyar Pamut SC (Lénárt); Sajószentpéteri BTK (Miskolc-Salgótarján); Kaposvári Rákóczi AC (Pécs-Kaposvár); Várpalotai MTE (Pestvidék-Szekesfehérvár); Kiskunhalasi VSE (Szeged-Kiskunhalas); Ceglédi VAOSZ (Szolnok-Békéscsaba)
- Promoted: Dohánygyári Lendület (Bíró-Dezső); Kisvárdai ÖSE (Debrecen-Nyíregyháza); Soproni FAC (Győr-Szombathely); Magyar Pamut SC (Lénárt); Kerámia SE (Lénárt); Sajószentpéteri BTK (Miskolc-Salgótarján); Kaposvári Rákóczi AC (Pécs-Kaposvár); Várpalotai MTE (Pestvidék-Szekesfehérvár); Tokodi Üveggyári SC (Pestvidék-Szekesfehérvár); Kiskunhalasi VSE (Szeged-Kiskunhalas); Ceglédi VAOSZ (Szolnok-Békéscsaba)

The 1948–49 Nemzeti Bajnokság III season was the 5th edition of the Nemzeti Bajnokság III. This year, the MLSz once again organized the NB III championship with 7 provincial groups and 2 Budapest groups. Each provincial group consisted of 16 teams. The first-place team advanced to NB II, while the last-place team was relegated.

== League tables ==
This year, the Hungarian Football Federation (MLSz) once again organized the NB III championship with 7 regional groups and 2 Budapest groups. Each regional group consisted of 16 teams. Each of the Budapest groups consisted of 18 teams.

=== Bíró Dezső group ===
Pos	Team	Pld	W	D	L	GF	GA	GD	Pts	Promotion or relegation
1	Dohánygyári Lendület	34	25	4	5	93	33	+60	54	Promoted to Nemzeti Bajnokság II
2	Húsos SC	34	23	6	5	88	39	+49	50 (Note: 2 points deducted?)	Promoted to Nemzeti Bajnokság II
3	Szentlőrinci Tégla FC (Note: formerly Szentlőrinci FC)	34	18	10	6	78	42	+36	46	
4	Csepeli Papír (Note: formerly Neményi Paper Mill)	34	18	7	9	92	57	+35	43	
5	OTI SE (TASE) (Note: previously, Zugló-Herminamezei AC merged into TASE, which became OTI; its new name is Meteor OTI)	34	18	7	9	78	49	+29	43	
6	Pénzügyi KaSE (Note: formerly KaSE, later renamed Pénzügyi DSE)	34	17	9	8	77	52	+25	43	
7	Kelenvölgyi SC (Note: new name: Kelenvölgyi PaSe NV)	34	15	9	10	72	66	+6	39	
8	Kőbányai Lombik TK (Note: Formerly Kőbányai TK; the MLSz, as the central association of the chemical industry union, assigned it to one of the vacant spots in NB II)	34	14	10	10	65	57	+8	38	Promoted to Nemzeti Bajnokság II
9	Nagytétényi MSE	34	16	3	15	69	65	+4	35	
10	Chinoin SC	34	13	6	15	69	82	−13	32	
11	Budapest-Rákosfalvai MTE	34	13	4	17	71	93	−22	30	
12	Pestújhelyi MSC (Note: Formerly Pestújhelyi SC)	34	11	7	16	51	62	−11	29	
13	Hungária SC	34	10	8	16	60	78	−18	28	
14	Tipográfia NyTE	34	9	8	17	45	78	−33	26	
15	Vívó és Atlétikai Club (VAC)	34	9	5	20	55	109	−54	23	Relegation to Megyei Bajnokság I
16	Tudományegyetemi MEFESz (Note: Formerly BEAC, which then merged with the Technical University’s MEFESz under the name Bp. MEFESz; did not get relegated!)	34	9	3	22	65	91	−26	21	
17	MOSzK (Note: Formed through the merger of Hangya AE, Mezőközpont, and Futura TK; withdrew on April 29, 1949, and was subsequently renamed Termékforgalmi SE)	34	6	3	25	34	49	−15	15	Relegation to Megyei Bajnokság I
18	Sashalmi MTK (Sashalmi TK)	34	6	3	25	33	93	−60	15	Relegation to Megyei Bajnokság I

Rules for classification: The top two teams from each group advanced to NB II, while the bottom four teams from each group were relegated. (The MEFESz team from the University of Science was subsequently assigned to one of the spots vacated by the mergers.)

=== Debrecen-Nyíregyháza group ===
Pos	Team	Pld	W	D	L	GF	GA	GD	Pts	Promotion or relegation
1	Kisvárdai ÖSE (Note: Formed in the summer of 1948 through the merger of Kisvárda MSE and Kisvárda Iparos SE; its new name was Kisvárda Vasas)	28	22	1	5	95	34	+61	45	Promoted to Nemzeti Bajnokság II
2	Nyírbátori SzIT SE (Note: formerly Nyírbátor SE)	28	18	4	6	64	40	+24	40	
3	Debreceni Postás	28	15	7	6	67	40	+27	37	
4	Karcagi SzTE (Note: formerly Karcag MÁV MTE)	28	13	5	10	62	50	+12	31	
5	Tiszalöki SE (Note: formerly Tiszalök BSE)	28	14	3	11	74	63	+11	31	
6	Berettyóújfalui DSE (Note: formerly Berettyóújfalu SE)	28	13	4	11	59	59	0	30	
7	Nagykállói DSE (Note: formerly Nagykálló SE)	28	11	7	10	47	46	+1	29	
8	Debreceni Lendület ESE (Note: formerly Debrecen Dohánygyári SE)	28	11	6	11	54	50	+4	28	
9	Püspökladányi Vasutas SK (Note: formerly Püspökladány MÁV)	28	11	4	13	39	35	+4	26	
10	Nyírmadai Ifjúsági SE (Note: formerly Nyírmada SE; renamed Nyírmada ÁGDSE)	28	10	6	12	43	61	−18	26	
11	Debreceni VAOSZ SE (Note: Replaced by Debreceni Előre)	28	9	4	15	47	67	−20	22	
12	Balkányi TSE (Balkányi MSE) (Note: New name: Balkányi ÁGDSE)	28	7	8	13	45	73	−28	22	
13	Fehérgyarmati DSE (Note: New name: Fehérgyarmati SzDSE)	28	6	9	13	46	61	−15	21	
14	Mándoki EPOSz (Note: Formerly Mándoki SE, then Mándoki DSE)	28	6	4	18	53	87	−34	16	
15	Záhonyi VSE	28	5	6	17	39	68	−29	16	
16	Kunmadarasi SE (Note: Withdrew.)	0	0	0	0	0	0	0	0	Relegation to Megyei Bajnokság I

Rules for classification: The first-place finisher advanced to NB II. Only Kunmadarasi ESE, which withdrew from the championship during the season, was eliminated.

=== Győr-Szombathely group ===
Pos	Team	Pld	W	D	L	GF	GA	GD	Pts	Promotion
1	Soproni FAC (Note: New name: Szakmaközi SFAC)	30	22	2	6	109	51	+58	46	Promoted to Nemzeti Bajnokság II
2	Veszprémi Vasas TC	30	20	3	7	66	52	+14	43	
3	Kapuvári SzSE (Kapuvári SE)	30	16	5	9	66	41	+25	37	
4	Szombathelyi Textil (Note: Merged with the Szombathely Leather Factory and Szombathely AK to form Szombathelyi SzMTE)	30	16	3	11	60	41	+19	35	
5	Hubertus SE	30	16	3	11	73	58	+15	35	
6	Soproni SOTEX SE	30	15	3	12	67	66	+1	33	
7	Lovászi MAORT (Note: Formerly Lovászi Olaj SE; new name: Lovászi Lombik MAORT SE)	30	13	6	11	60	42	+18	32	
8	Kühne SE	30	14	3	13	61	57	+4	31	
9	Bánhidai VSE (Bánhidai SE) (Note: New name: Bánhidai Erőmű SE)	30	13	3	14	51	81	−30	29	
10	Zalaegerszegi Vasutas SE (Note: Merged with the Zalaegerszeg Post Office under the name Zalaegerszegi MTE)	30	13	2	15	75	53	+22	28	
11	Ajkai SE (Note: New name: Ajkai Dolgozók SK)	30	11	3	16	63	66	−3	25	
12	Celldömölki VSE (Note: New name: Celldömölki Vasutas SK)	30	12	1	17	57	68	−11	25	
13	Győri II. ker. MTE (Note: On August 30, 1948, merged with the Győr textile factories to form Győri KTSE, then reverted to II. ker. MTE)	30	11	3	16	51	66	−15	25	
14	Szombathelyi Bőrgyár (Note: Merged with Szombathelyi Textiles under the name Szombathelyi SzMTE)	30	9	6	15	45	68	−23	24	
15	Veszprémi Vasutas SE (Note: In August 1949, Veszprémi Vasas TC and Veszprémi Vasutas merged under the name Veszprémi Dolgozók SE)	30	8	2	20	53	87	−34	18	
16	Zalaegerszegi Postás (Note: Merged with Zalaegerszegi VSE under the name Zalaegerszegi MTE)	30	6	2	22	35	95	−60	14	

Rules for classification: The first-place team in each group was promoted to NB II. No teams were relegated due to the mergers.

=== Lénárt group ===
Pos	Team	Pld	W	D	L	GF	GA	GD	Pts	Promotion or relegation
1	Magyar Pamut SC	30	20	8	2	99	34	+65	48	Promoted to Nemzeti Bajnokság II
2	Kerámia SE	30	21	1	8	83	43	+40	43	Promoted to Nemzeti Bajnokság II
3	Magyar Posztógyári SE (Note: Formed through the merger of Csepeli Posztó and Csepeli SE under the name Magyar Posztó SE)	30	16	9	5	74	33	+41	41	
4	Nemzeti Bank (Note: Formerly the Banknote Printing Works; later renamed Meteor National Bank)	30	16	8	6	92	50	+42	40	
5	Ganzhajó	30	15	6	9	65	49	+16	36	
6	Budakalászi MSE (Note: Renamed Budakalászi Textil)	30	13	7	10	73	56	+17	33	
7	Hutter Olaj SE	30	13	4	13	71	61	+10	30	
8	Jacquard SC	30	12	6	12	51	46	+5	30	
9	Csillaghegyi MTE (Note: Renamed Csillaghegyi Textil)	30	13	2	15	57	65	−8	28	
10	Budapest SE (Note: Formerly Házinyomda)	30	11	4	15	59	74	−15	26	
11	Ferencvárosi Vasutas SK	30	10	6	14	53	78	−25	26	
12	Emergé SC	30	11	3	16	54	68	−14	25	
13	Szabadkikötő SE	30	7	6	17	46	78	−32	20	
14	Testvériség SE (Note: Renamed Rákospalotai Vasutas SK)	30	8	4	18	43	76	−33	20	
15	WM KaSE	30	8	2	20	55	107	−52	18	Relegation to Megyei Bajnokság I
16	Rákospalotai EAC (Note: Renamed Rákospalotai Szakmaközi AC)	30	6	4	20	38	95	−57	16	Relegation to Megyei Bajnokság I
17	Hitelbank SE (Note: Deleted; dissolved as a result of nationalization)	0	0	0	0	0	0	0	0	Relegation to Megyei Bajnokság I
18	Philips (Note: Deleted)	0	0	0	0	0	0	0	0	Relegation to Megyei Bajnokság I

Rules for classification: The top two teams from each group advanced to NB II, while the bottom four teams from each group were relegated.

=== Miskolc-Salgótarján group ===
Pos	Team	Pld	W	D	L	GF	GA	GD	Pts	Promotion or relegation
1	Sajószentpéteri BTK (Note: New name: Sajószentpéteri Tárna)	30	23	1	6	89	32	+57	47	Promoted to Nemzeti Bajnokság II
2	Zagyvapálfalvai SE (Note: August 24, 1948: Merger of Zagyv. KÜSE and PBSE under the name Zagyvapálfalvai SE)	30	21	2	7	77	34	+43	44	
3	Borsodnádasdi Lemezgyári Vasas SK (Note: Formerly Borsodnádasdi LASE)	30	20	4	6	70	44	+26	44	
4	Balassagyarmati MTE (Note: Formerly Balassagyarmati MÁV SE; new name: Balassagyarmati Szakmaközi SE)	30	15	4	11	70	53	+17	34	
5	Gyöngyösi SE (Note: New name: Gyöngyösi SzSE)	30	14	4	12	69	59	+10	32	
6	Selypi Petőfi (Note: New name: Selypi ÉDOSz)	30	14	3	13	51	48	+3	31	
7	Sárospataki TC (Note: New name: Sárospataki DSK)	30	12	5	13	59	56	+3	29	
8	Egri SzTK	30	12	5	13	47	49	−2	29	
9	Mezőkövesdi MTK (Note: New name: Mezőkövesdi SzTK)	30	12	3	15	69	73	−4	27	
10	Mátravidéki Erőmű Lőrinci SE	30	12	2	16	49	59	−10	26	
11	Salgóbányai Tárna (Note: Formerly Salgóbányai FC)	30	11	2	17	42	88	−46	24	
12	Bánszállási Tárna (Note: Formerly Bánszállási SzIT)	30	8	7	15	62	73	−11	23	
13	Kisterenyei Tárna (Note: Formerly Kisterenyei BSE)	30	11	1	18	51	67	−16	23	
14	Rózsaszentmártoni Bányász SE(RTK)	30	9	5	16	35	55	−20	23	
15	Baglyasaljai SE (Note: New name: Baglyasaljai Tárna)	30	9	4	17	27	67	−40	22	Relegation to Megyei Bajnokság I
16	Putnoki Bányász TK (PSE) (Note: New name: Putnoki Tárna)	30	8	6	16	50	60	−10	20 (Note: 2 points deducted)	Relegation to Megyei Bajnokság I

Rules for classification: The first-place team advanced to NB II, while the bottom two teams were relegated.

=== Pécs-Kaposvár group ===
Pos	Team	Pld	W	D	L	GF	GA	GD	Pts	Promotion or relegation
1	Kaposvári Rákóczi AC (Note: 49.08.31. Merger of Kaposvári MTE, Vasutas, and Rákóczi AC under the name Kaposvári Dolgozók SK)	30	21	7	2	118	29	+89	49	Promoted to Nemzeti Bajnokság II
2	Dombóvári VSE	30	19	7	4	104	45	+59	45	
3	Komlói SE (Note: New name: Komlói Szakszervezeti SE)	30	19	5	6	115	49	+66	43	
4	Szászvári SzIT SE (Note: New name: Szászvári Tárna)	30	17	6	7	77	44	+33	40	
5	Pécsbányatelepi Munkás SE (Note: New name: Pécsbányatelepi Tárna)	30	16	7	7	80	57	+23	39	
6	Pécsi Postás SE	30	17	4	9	64	39	+25	38	
7	Simontornyai BTC	30	15	3	12	69	57	+12	33	
8	Barcsi Szakmaközi SE (Note: Formerly Barcsi Vasutas SC; new name: Barcsi SzMSE)	30	13	7	10	64	56	+8	33	
9	PAC Közüzem (Pécsi AC) (Note: Formed through the merger of Pécsi AC Bajcsy-Zsilinszkij and Pécsi Közüzemi SE; new name: Pécsi KaSE)	30	11	3	16	42	70	−28	25	
10	Nagyatádi MTE (Nagyatádi MSE)	30	10	5	15	60	105	−45	25	
11	Zrínyi Miklós Szigetvári AK	30	11	2	17	37	59	−22	24	
12	Szekszárdi Törekvés SzSE (Note: Formerly Szekszárdi TVSE; new name: Szekszárdi Törekvés MSE)	30	10	3	17	45	78	−33	23	
13	Kaposvári VSE (Note: August 31, 1949: Merger of Kaposvári MTE, Vasutas, and Rákóczi AC under the name Kaposvári Dolgozók SK)	30	8	5	17	51	76	−25	21	
14	Bátaszéki VSE	30	6	8	16	62	102	−40	20	
15	Pécsi MEFESZ(PEAC)	30	6	4	20	41	88	−47	16	
16	Paksi DSE (Note: formerly Paksi SE, removed from the league at the end of the season)	30	1	4	25	32	107	−75	4 (Note: 2 points deducted)	Relegation to Megyei Bajnokság I

Rules for classification: Due to the merger of the Kaposvár clubs, the first-place team did not advance to NB II.

=== Pestvidék-Székesfehérvár group ===
Pos	Team	Pld	W	D	L	GF	GA	GD	Pts	Promotion or relegation
1	Várpalotai MTE (Note: New name: Várpalota Tárna)	30	26	1	3	130	45	+85	53	Promoted to Nemzeti Bajnokság II
2	Tokodi Üveggyári SC	30	18	4	8	85	47	+38	40	Promoted to Nemzeti Bajnokság II
3	Fehérvári DSE (Note: Merger of ARAK, Szfv. TC, Szfv. Leather Factory, and Szfv. Hunting Ammunition Factory; new name: Szfv. DSE)	30	15	6	9	76	62	+14	36	
4	Siófoki SE (Note: New name: Siófok Workers’ SE)	30	15	5	10	68	47	+21	35	
5	Pilisi EPOSz (Note: Formerly Pilis MÁV; new name: Pilis SzDSE)	30	15	4	11	68	55	+13	34	
6	Esztergomi VSE (Note: New name: Esztergom SzDSE)	30	14	5	11	73	64	+9	33	
7	Tatabányai ISE (Felsőgallai IMÁV) (Note: Formerly Felsőgalla Industrial Complex MÁV; new name: Tatabánya MÉMOSz)	30	15	1	14	78	67	+11	31	
8	Péti MTE (Péti KSE) (Note: New name: Péti Lombik)	30	12	6	12	73	64	+9	30	
9	Fűzfői MTE (Note: New name: Fűzfő Lombik)	30	13	4	13	77	70	+7	30	
10	Vecsési MTK (Note: New name: Vecsés SzMTK)	30	12	4	14	72	78	−6	28	
11	Fóti SE (Note: New name: Fót MSE)	30	12	4	14	59	79	−20	28	
12	Rákoscsabai MTK (Note: New name: Rákoscsaba Postás)	30	11	4	15	54	71	−17	26	
13	Gödöllői TK (Gödöllői SE) (Note: Formerly Gödöllői SE; new name: Gödöllői SzTK)	30	9	6	15	55	84	−29	24	
14	Monori SE (Note: New name: Monori SzSE)	30	11	2	17	61	96	−35	24	
15	Balatonfüredi TIMSE (BHMSE) (Note: New name: Balatonfüredi Vasas Hajógyári SK)	30	8	4	18	53	81	−28	20	Relegation to Megyei Bajnokság I
16	Váci Vasutas SE	30	3	2	25	48	120	−72	8	Relegation to Megyei Bajnokság I

Rules for classification: The result of the Fót-FDSE match (1–0) was annulled, and the 2 points were awarded to FDSE because an ineligible player appeared on Fót’s roster. The top two teams in each group were promoted to NB II, while the bottom two teams were relegated.

=== Szeged-Kiskunhalas group ===
Pos	Team	Pld	W	D	L	GF	GA	GD	Pts	Promotion or relegation
1	Kiskunhalasi VSE	30	20	6	4	100	42	+58	46	Promoted to Nemzeti Bajnokság II
2	Kiskunfélegyházi MTK (Note: Formed through the merger of Kiskunfélegyházi TK and Kiskunfélegyházi Vasutas SE)	30	17	7	6	94	45	+49	41	
3	Móravárosi ÉDOSz (Note: Formerly Móravárosi TE)	30	18	5	7	86	68	+18	41	
4	Bajai SzAK (Note: Formerly Bajai MTE)	30	17	6	7	75	48	+27	40	
5	Szegedi Postás SE	30	16	3	11	63	46	+17	35	
6	Hódmezővásárhelyi MTE (Note: Merged with Hódmezővásárhelyi TVE under the name Hódmezővásárhelyi SzMTE)	30	14	6	10	52	43	+9	34	
7	Szegedi Honvéd TK	30	14	5	11	72	55	+17	33	
8	Szentesi MTE (Note: New name: Szentesi SzTE)	30	14	5	11	59	65	−6	33	
9	Szőregi Rákóczi SE (Note: New name: Szőregi EPOSz)	30	12	8	10	61	48	+13	32	
10	Bácsalmási SE (Note: New name: Bácsalmási SzSE)	30	11	10	9	56	53	+3	32	
11	Makói SzSE (Note: Formerly Makói MTE)	30	12	3	15	39	58	−19	27	
12	Jánoshalmi SE (Note: New name: Jánoshalmi SzSE)	30	10	3	17	45	74	−29	23	
13	Kisteleki TE (Note: New name: Kistelek SzTE)	30	7	6	17	51	68	−17	20	
14	Szentesi Vasutas SE (Note: Formerly Szentes MÁV; new name: Szentes VSK)	30	8	4	18	38	57	−19	20	
15	Hódmezővásárhelyi TVE (Note: Merged with Hódmezővásárhely MTE under the name Hódmezővásárhely SzMTE)	30	5	7	18	30	53	−23	17	
16	Kiskunhalasi AC (Note: Merged with Kiskunhalas Schneider TE under the name Kiskunhalas ÉDOSz)	30	2	2	26	32	130	−98	6	Relegation to Megyei Bajnokság I

Rules for classification: The result of the HTVE-Móraváros match (3–2) was annulled, and the two points were awarded to Móraváros because HTVE played while under suspension.

The match between Kistelek and Jánoshalma scheduled for June 3 was canceled by JSE. The association required Jánoshalma to play the match on the 10th. The Jánoshalma team did not show up for the match on the 10th either, so Kistelek was awarded the two points with a 0–0 result.

The first-place team advanced to NB II, while the last-place team was relegated.

=== Szolnok-Békéscsaba group ===
Pos	Team	Pld	W	D	L	GF	GA	GD	Pts	Promotion or relegation
1	Ceglédi VAOSZ (Note: formerly Ceglédi Kossuth Iparos SE; new name: Ceglédi SzSE)	30	24	3	3	78	21	+57	51	Promoted to Nemzeti Bajnokság II
2	Martfűi Cikta (Note: new name: Martfűi BDSE)	30	22	4	4	114	30	+84	48	
3	Sarkadi MSE (Note: new name: Sarkadi SzMSE)	30	17	3	10	75	62	+13	37	
4	Jászberényi Lehel MTK	30	16	4	10	69	39	+30	36	
5	Gyulai SE (Note: formed through the merger of Gyulai AC and Gyulai TE; new name: Gyulai SzSE)	30	15	4	11	73	56	+17	34	
6	Kisújszállási VSE (Note: formerly Kisújszállási MÁV; new name: Kisújszállási VSK)	30	13	4	13	52	53	−1	30	
7	Békéscsabai VSE (Note: Formerly Békéscsaba MÁV SE)	30	12	6	12	42	44	−2	30	
8	Szarvasi EPOSz (Note: Formerly Szarvas SE; new name: Szarvas Vasas)	30	13	4	13	59	65	−6	30	
9	Nagykőrösi MSE	30	13	3	14	68	58	+10	29	
10	Tótkomlósi MTK (Note: New name: Tótkomlós SzMTK)	30	11	5	14	61	79	−18	27	
11	Békéscsabai Agyagipar SK (Note: Formerly Békéscsaba SUK MaDISz)	30	12	3	15	57	75	−18	27	
12	Mezőtúri AFC (Note: New name: Mezőtúr SzSE)	30	12	3	15	63	88	−25	27	
13	Békési MSE (Note: New name: Békés SzMSE)	30	10	6	14	33	65	−32	26	
14	Alberti-Irsai EPOSz (Note: New name: Albert-Irsai DSE)	30	9	3	18	56	69	−13	21	
15	Mezőkovácsházi TE (Note: New name: Mezőkovácsházi EPOSz)	30	7	7	16	41	67	−26	21	
16	Endrődi MTK (Note: Formerly Endrődi BSE)	30	2	2	26	23	93	−70	6	Relegation to Megyei Bajnokság I

Rules for classification: The NB III committee awarded the two points from the Tótkomlós-Jászberény match—which was abandoned with the score tied at 2–2—to Jászberény, as it found the Tótkomlós team at fault for the match’s abandonment. The two points from the Endrőd-Szarvas match, which ended 3–2, were awarded to Szarvas with a 0–0 goal difference.

== See also ==
- 1948–49 Magyar Kupa
- 1948–49 Nemzeti Bajnokság I
- 1948–49 Nemzeti Bajnokság II
