= 1949–50 Nemzeti Bajnokság III =

Nemzeti Bajnokság III
- Season: 1949–50
- Champions: Magyar Posztógyári SE (Bíró-Dezső); Nyíregyházi Elektromos (Debrecen-Nyíregyháza); Szombathelyi Szakszervezeti MTE (Győr-Szombathely); Csepeli Papír SC (Lénárt); Egri Erdőgazdasági SzTK (Miskolc-Salgótarján); Komlói Tárna SE (Pécs-Kaposvár); Ceglédi VSK (Pestvidék-Szekesfehérvár); Szegedi Honvéd SE (Szeged-Kiskunhalas); Gyulai SzSE (Szolnok-Békéscsaba)
- Promoted: Magyar Posztógyári SE (Bíró-Dezső); Dunakeszi VSK (Bíró-Dezső); Csillaghegyi Textil (Bíró-Dezső); Szombathelyi Szakszervezeti MTE (Győr-Szombathely); Csepeli Papír SC (Lénárt); Újlaki FC (Lénárt); Egri Erdőgazdasági SzTK (Miskolc-Salgótarján); Komlói Tárna SE (Pécs-Kaposvár); Ceglédi VSK (Pestvidék-Szekesfehérvár); Tatabányai ISE MÉMOSZ (Pestvidék-Szekesfehérvár); Fűzfői Lombik (Pestvidék-Szekesfehérvár); Székesfehérvári MDSE (Pestvidék-Szekesfehérvár); Szegedi Honvéd SE (Szeged-Kiskunhalas); Gyulai SzSE (Szolnok-Békéscsaba)

The 1949–50 Nemzeti Bajnokság III season was the 6th edition of the Nemzeti Bajnokság III.

== League tables ==
=== Bíró Dezső group ===
Pos	Team	Pld	W	D	L	GF	GA	GD	Pts	Promotion or relegation
1	Magyar Posztógyári SE	30	22	2	6	89	32	+57	46	Promoted to Nemzeti Bajnokság II
2	Dunakeszi Vasutas SK	30	19	6	5	88	40	+48	44	Promoted to Nemzeti Bajnokság II
3	Láng Gépgyár SK (Note: formerly Láng SK)	30	16	9	5	67	47	+20	41	
4	Ganzhajó (Note: new name: Vasas Ganz-hajó)	30	18	5	7	58	43	+15	41	
5	Budakalászi Textilgyári SE (Note: formerly Budakalászi MSE)	30	17	4	9	63	46	+17	38	
6	Hutter Olaj SC (Note: new name: Rákospalotai Növényolaj)	30	14	8	8	77	58	+19	36	
7	Budapest SE	30	13	7	10	49	55	−6	33	
8	Meteor Nemzeti Bank (Note: formerly Nemzeti Bank)	30	12	5	13	64	71	−7	29	
9	Szabadkikötő SE	30	9	9	12	50	59	−9	27	
10	Hungária Jacquard SE	30	10	6	14	55	48	+7	26	
11	Egyenruházat NV SE (Note: formerly Erzsébeti TC, then Egyenruházati KTSz)	30	8	9	13	50	67	−17	25	
12	Csillaghegyi Textil (Note: formerly Csillaghegyi MTE, then renamed Csillaghegyi Szakmaközi MTE; promoted to NB II by a decision of the MLSz Executive Committee)	30	11	2	17	57	65	−8	24	Promoted to Nemzeti Bajnokság II
13	Hofherr SC	30	8	6	16	55	64	−9	22	
14	Rákospalotai Vasutas SK (Note: formerly Testvériség SE)	30	8	4	18	37	66	−29	20	
15	Budapesti MEFESZ (Note: A merger of the University of Science MEFESz and the Technical University MEFESz; new name: Budapest DISz FSE)	30	7	3	20	39	77	−38	17	
16	Ferencvárosi Vasutas SK	30	3	5	22	39	99	−60	11	Relegation to Megyei Bajnokság I

Notes:

Notes: The top two teams advanced to NB II, while the last-place team was relegated to BLASz Division I.

=== Debrecen-Nyíregyháza group ===
Pos	Team	Pld	W	D	L	GF	GA	GD	Pts	Promotion or relegation
1	Nyíregyházi Elektromos (Note: formerly Nyíregyházi Szabolcs DSE)	30	24	5	1	92	27	+65	53	Promoted to Nemzeti Bajnokság II
2	Püspökladányi VSK (Note: transferred to the Szolnok-Békéscsaba group)	30	18	3	9	66	49	+17	39	
3	Nagykállói DSE	30	15	8	7	60	48	+12	38	
4	Debreceni Postás SE	30	16	5	9	73	51	+22	37	
5	Fehérgyarmati SzDSE (Note: formerly Fehérgyarmati DSE)	30	15	5	10	62	50	+12	35	
6	Debreceni Előre (Note: Replaced Debrecen VAOSz SE)	30	16	2	12	83	72	+11	34	
7	Nyírbátori SzIT SE (Note: Formerly Nyírbátor SE; new name: Nyírbátor ÉDOSz)	30	15	3	12	63	43	+20	33	
8	Debreceni Lendület SE (Note: New name: Debrecen ÉDOSz)	30	11	7	12	73	68	+5	29	
9	Mándoki EPOSz (Note: New name: Mándok DISz)	30	12	3	15	54	71	−17	27	
10	Balkányi ÁGDSE (Balkányi EPOSz) (Note: Formerly Balkány TSE)	30	12	3	15	40	59	−19	27	
11	Hajdúnánási EPOSz (Note: Formerly Hajdúnánás DTE)	30	11	4	15	53	60	−7	26	
12	Nyírmadai ÁGDSE (Note: Formerly Nyírmada Youth SE)	30	8	10	12	55	66	−11	26	
13	Tiszalöki ÖMTE (Tiszalöki MTE) (Note: formerly Tiszalök SE, now Tiszamenti Vízműépítők)	30	7	7	16	47	66	−19	21	
14	Berettyóújfalui DSE	30	8	4	18	48	59	−11	20	
15	Záhonyi Vasutas SK (Note: formerly Záhonyi Vasutas SE)	30	7	4	19	40	66	−26	18	Relegation to Megyei Bajnokság I
16	Dombrádi ÉDOSz (Note: formerly Dombrád Tisza SE)	30	8	1	21	43	97	−54	17	Relegation to Megyei Bajnokság I

Notes:

Notes: The Mándok–Berettyóújfalu match was canceled; Mándok was awarded the two points with a 0–0 result.

=== Győr-Szombathely group ===
Pos	Team	Pld	W	D	L	GF	GA	GD	Pts	Promotion or relegation
1	Szombathelyi Szakszervezeti MTE (Note: Formerly Szombathelyi Textil; on August 23, 1949, it merged with Szombathelyi AK and the Szombathely Leather Factory)	30	19	5	6	69	27	+42	43	Promoted to Nemzeti Bajnokság II
2	Kőszegi Nemez Posztó SE	30	15	7	8	60	34	+26	37	
3	Szombathelyi Postás	30	15	6	9	78	63	+15	36	
4	Győri Szakmaközi MTE (Note: July 9, 1949: Merger of MTE (District II) and Hutter Újtelepi TE (Győr))	30	14	6	10	52	50	+2	34	
5	Zalaegerszegi MTE (Note: Formed through the merger of Zalaegerszegi VSE and Zalaegerszegi Postás)	30	13	6	11	57	57	0	32	
6	Soproni Sotex SE	30	13	5	12	52	39	+13	31	
7	Ajkai Dolgozók SE (Note: Formerly Ajkai SE)	30	12	7	11	58	48	+10	31	
8	Győri Vörös Fonal (Note: Assigned to NB III on an exceptional basis by decision of the Hungarian Football Association (MLSz))	30	13	5	12	52	50	+2	31	
9	Mosonmagyaróvári Hubertus SE (Note: New name: Mosonmagyaróvári Vasas Hubertus)	30	12	7	11	47	53	−6	31	
10	Veszprémi Dolgozók SE (Note: Formed in August 1949 through the merger of Veszprémi Vasas TC and Veszprémi Vasutas)	30	11	8	11	55	63	−8	30	
11	Bánhidai Erőmű (Note: Formerly Bánhidai SE)	30	10	8	12	30	39	−9	28	
12	Kapuvári SzSE (Note: Formerly Kapuvári SE)	30	11	4	15	46	51	−5	26	
13	Pápai SzMTE (Note: Formerly Pápai MTE)	30	10	4	16	51	67	−16	24	
14	Mosoni Kühne SE (Note: New name: Mosoni Vasas Kühne)	30	8	6	16	43	61	−18	22	
15	Celldömölki Vasutas SK	30	8	6	16	42	66	−24	22	
16	Lovászi Lombik MAORT SE (Note: Formerly Lovászi MAORT SE)	30	9	4	17	57	81	−24	22	Relegation to Megyei Bajnokság I

Notes:

Notes: The champion was promoted to NB II, while the last-place team was relegated to the West Transdanubian ALSz First Division.

=== Lénárt group ===
Pos	Team	Pld	W	D	L	GF	GA	GD	Pts	Promotion or relegation
1	Csepeli Papír SC	30	24	3	3	80	34	+46	51	Promoted to Nemzeti Bajnokság II
2	Újlaki FC (Note: New name: Óbudai Építők)	30	18	5	7	60	28	+32	41	Promoted to Nemzeti Bajnokság II
3	Törekvés SE	30	16	7	7	65	37	+28	39	
4	Meteor OTI (Note: Formerly OTI, then renamed Meteor SzTK)	30	14	10	6	61	46	+15	38	
5	Pénzügyi DSE (Pénzügyi KaSE) (Note: New name: Pénzügyőrök SE)	30	16	3	11	68	58	+10	35	
6	EMERGÉ SC	30	14	6	10	67	67	0	34	
7	Budapest-Rákosfalvai MTE (Note: July 21, 1950: New name: Budapest-Rákosfalvi Lombik SE)	30	14	3	13	81	63	+18	31	
8	Nagytétényi TE (Note: Formerly Nagytétényi SC)	30	12	5	13	63	61	+2	29	
9	Szentlőrinci Téglagyári FC	30	11	7	12	57	58	−1	29	
10	Vecsési SzMTK (Note: Formerly Vecsési MTK)	30	10	8	12	48	56	−8	28	
11	Kelenvölgyi PaSeNV BLC (Note: Formerly Kelenvölgyi SC; it was scheduled to compete in BLASz Division II, but Standard competed in its place)	30	10	7	13	43	60	−17	27	
12	Tipográfia NyTE (Note: August 15, 1950: Merger of Tipográfia NyTE and Állami Nyomda under the name Tipográfia Állami Nyomda)	30	9	9	12	39	67	−28	27	
13	Generátor SE (Note: Formerly Oetl SC)	30	10	5	15	49	61	−12	25	
14	Hungária SC	30	7	6	17	47	87	−40	20	
15	Chinoin Lombik SE (Note: Former Chinoin SC)	30	4	7	19	31	62	−31	15	Relegation to Megyei Bajnokság I
16	Pestújhelyi MSC (Note: Withdrew; on April 18, 1950, merged with Autótaxi SC to form Autótaxi MSC)	30	3	5	22	21	35	−14	11	

Notes:

Notes: The top two finishers advanced to NB II, while 15th-place Chinoin Lombik SE was relegated to the BLASz First Division.

=== Miskolc-Salgótarján group ===
Pos	Team	Pld	W	D	L	GF	GA	GD	Pts	Promotion or relegation
1	Egri Erdőgazdasági SzTK (Note: Before March 11, 1950: Eger Trade Union Sports Club)	30	21	5	4	108	30	+78	47	Promoted to Nemzeti Bajnokság II
2	Selypi ÉDOSZ (Note: Formerly Selyp Petőfi MTE)	30	19	5	6	86	41	+45	43	
3	Szerencsi ÉDOSz (Note: Formerly Szerencs Sugar and Chocolate Factory SE)	30	17	5	8	69	39	+30	39	
4	Gyöngyösi Szakmaközi SE (Note: Formerly Gyöngyös SE)	30	17	4	9	67	50	+17	38	
5	Borsodnádasdi Lemezgyári Vasas SK	30	16	3	11	71	61	+10	35	
6	Mátravidéki Erőművek Lőrinci SE	30	15	3	12	57	64	−7	33	
7	Kisterenyei Tárna	30	12	7	11	68	65	+3	31	
8	Diósgyőri Lombik (Note: Formerly Diósgyőr Paper SE)	30	14	2	14	73	55	+18	30	
9	Nagybátonyi Tárna (Note: Formerly Nagybátony OSE)	30	12	6	12	60	66	−6	30	
10	Bánszállási Tárna	30	13	1	16	54	54	0	27	
11	Mezőkövesdi SzTK	30	10	7	13	75	82	−7	27	
12	Zagyvapálfalvai MÉMOSZ (Note: Formerly Zagyvapálfalvi SE; new name: Zagyvapálfalvi Építők)	30	10	7	13	58	71	−13	27	
13	Balassagyarmati Szakmaközi SE (Note: Formed through the merger of Balassagyarmati MTE and Balassagyarmati MÁV)	30	9	4	17	48	78	−30	22	
14	Salgóbányai Tárna	30	8	6	16	44	77	−33	22	
15	Rózsaszentmártoni Tárna (Rózsaszentmártoni BSE) (Note: Merged into Petőfibányai Tárna and competed as its second team the following year)	30	7	6	17	31	74	−43	20	Relegation to Megyei Bajnokság I
16	Sárospataki DSK (Note: Formerly Sárospataki TC)	30	4	1	25	22	84	−62	9	Relegation to Megyei Bajnokság I

Notes:

Notes: First-place Egri EszTK was promoted to NB II, while the bottom two teams were relegated to the Northwest Hungarian and North Hungarian LASz leagues, respectively.

=== Pécs-Kaposvár group ===
Pos	Team	Pld	W	D	L	GF	GA	GD	Pts	Promotion or relegation
1	Komlói Tárna SE (Note: Former Komló Trade Union SE)	28	24	3	1	114	39	+75	51	Promoted to Nemzeti Bajnokság II
2	Dombóvári Vasutas SK	28	20	3	5	72	35	+37	43	
3	Pécsbányatelepi Tárna (Note: Former Pécsbányatelep Workers’ SE)	28	19	2	7	88	46	+42	40	
4	Szászvári Tárna (Note: Former Szászvár SzIT)	28	16	4	8	72	36	+36	36	
5	Simontornyai BTC	28	11	6	11	68	44	+24	28	
6	Pécsi KaSE (Note: Former Pécs AC Közüzem, now known as Pécs Dózsa)	28	12	4	12	68	53	+15	28	
7	Nagyatádi MTE	28	12	3	13	51	74	−23	27	
8	Barcsi SzMSE (Note: Former Barcs SzSE, now known as Barcs SzMTE)	28	11	3	14	60	49	+11	25	
9	Nagymányoki Tárna (Note: Former Nagymányok Torpedo SE)	28	10	4	14	47	39	+8	24	
10	Marcali DSK (Note: Former Marcali PSE)	28	9	5	14	67	95	−28	23	
11	ZM Szigetvári AK	34	10	9	15	38	70	−32	23 (Note: 6 points deducted?)	
12	Bátaszéki VSK	28	10	2	16	56	91	−35	22	
13	Pécsi Erdőgazdaság NVSE (Note: Former Csányoszrói Dendra)	28	9	3	16	41	72	−31	21	
14	Pécsi Postás	28	6	5	17	44	66	−22	17	
15	Szekszárdi Törekvés MSE (Note: Former Szekszárdi Törekvés SzSE)	28	4	4	20	37	114	−77	12	Relegation to Megyei Bajnokság I
16	Pécsi MEFESz (Note: Pécsi MEFESz withdrew)	0	0	0	0	0	0	0	0	Relegation to Megyei Bajnokság I

Notes:

Notes: The champion was promoted to NB II, while 15th-place Szekszárdi Törekvés MSE was relegated to the Southwest Hungarian LASz.

=== Pestvidék-Székesfehérvár group ===
Pos	Team	Pld	W	D	L	GF	GA	GD	Pts	Promotion or relegation
1	Ceglédi VSK (Note: Formerly Ceglédi VSE)	30	21	4	5	90	31	+59	46	Promoted to Nemzeti Bajnokság II
2	Tatabányai ISE MÉMOSZ (Note: Formerly Tatabányai Ipartelepek SE)	30	17	4	9	97	54	+43	38	Promoted to Nemzeti Bajnokság II
3	Fűzfői Lombik (Note: Formerly Fűzfői MTE)	30	15	4	11	72	57	+15	34	Promoted to Nemzeti Bajnokság II
4	Kisgyóni Tárna (Note: Formerly Kisgyóni BSE)	30	15	3	12	50	51	−1	33	
5	Székesfehérvári MDSE (Note: Formerly Fehérvári DSE; promoted to NB II by a decision of the MLSz Executive Committee)	30	15	2	13	84	64	+20	32	Promoted to Nemzeti Bajnokság II
6	Siófoki DSE (Note: Formerly Siófoki SE; new name: Siófoki Építők)	30	14	3	13	71	45	+26	31	
7	Rákosmenti Lombik (Note: formerly Magyar Vegyiművek RMTE)	30	13	5	12	58	67	−9	31	
8	Péti Lombik (Péti MTE)	30	13	4	13	67	64	+3	30	
9	Rákoscsabai Postás (Note: formerly Rákoscsaba MTK)	30	12	6	12	44	57	−13	30	
10	Gödöllői SzTK (Note: formerly Gödöllő TK)	30	13	2	15	37	50	−13	28	
11	Alberti-Irsai DSE (Note: formerly Albert-Irsai EPOSz, later renamed Irsa-Ceglédbercel DSE)	30	11	5	14	44	59	−15	27	
12	Monori SzSE (Note: formerly Monor SE)	30	11	5	14	55	70	−15	27	
13	Esztergomi SzDSE (Note: formerly Esztergom MVSE, now known as Esztergom DSE)	30	10	6	14	56	65	−9	26	
14	Komáromi DSK (Note: formerly Komáromi Vasutas SE)	30	12	2	16	62	73	−11	26	
15	Pilisi SzDSE (Note: formerly Pilisi EPOSz)	30	11	1	18	38	65	−27	23	Relegation to Megyei Bajnokság I
16	Fóti MSE (Note: formerly Fóti SE)	30	7	4	19	41	94	−53	18	Relegation to Megyei Bajnokság I

=== Szeged-Kiskunhalas group ===
Pos	Team	Pld	W	D	L	GF	GA	GD	Pts	Promotion or relegation
1	Szegedi Honvéd SE (Note: formerly Honvéd TK (Szeged))	30	21	3	6	105	34	+71	45	Promoted to Nemzeti Bajnokság II
2	Móravárosi ÉDOSz (Note: new name: Szegedi ÉDOSz)	30	18	5	7	79	55	+24	41	
3	Bajai SzAK	30	17	5	8	71	52	+19	39	
4	Kiskunfélegyházi SzTK (Kiskunfélegyházi MTK)	30	15	8	7	100	44	+56	38	
5	Dorozsmai KMTE	30	17	4	9	79	70	+9	38	
6	Szőregi EPOSz (Note: formerly, then renamed: Szőregi Rákóczi)	30	12	9	9	52	53	−1	33	
7	Bácsalmási Szakszervezeti SE (Note: formerly Bácsalmási SE)	30	14	3	13	68	57	+11	31	
8	Kiskőrösi Petőfi	30	12	5	13	65	65	0	29	
9	Szegedi Postás	30	11	6	13	53	60	−7	28	
9	Szentesi SzTE (Note: formerly Szentesi MTE)	30	12	4	14	53	60	−7	28	
11	Kisteleki SzTE (Kisteleki TE)	30	9	10	11	51	63	−12	28	
12	Hódmezővásárhelyi SzMTE (Note: formed from the merger of Hódmezővásárhelyi MTE and Hódmezővásárhelyi TVE)	30	9	8	13	63	53	+10	26	
13	Csongrádi SzTK (Note: formed from the merger of Csongrádi MTK and Csongrádi Tisza)	30	10	3	17	69	71	−2	23	
14	Jánoshalmai SzSE (Note: formerly Jánoshalmi SE)	30	8	6	16	31	83	−52	22	
15	Szentesi VSK (Note: formerly Szentesi VSE)	30	6	7	17	40	87	−47	19	Relegation to Megyei Bajnokság I
16	Makói SzSE (Note: Merged into Makói Vasutas SK)	30	3	6	21	23	95	−72	12	Relegation to Megyei Bajnokság I

Notes:

Notes: The group leader, Szegedi Honvéd SE, was promoted to NB II; the 15th-place team was relegated to the South Hungarian LASz First Division; the last-place team was dissolved through a merger.

=== Szolnok-Békéscsaba group ===
Pos	Team	Pld	W	D	L	GF	GA	GD	Pts	Promotion or relegation
1	Gyulai SzSE (Note: formerly Gyulai SE)	30	21	4	5	77	32	+45	46	Promoted to Nemzeti Bajnokság II
2	Sarkadi SzMSE (Note: formerly Sarkadi MSE)	30	19	4	7	68	30	+38	42	
3	Mezőtúri SzSE (Note: formerly Mezőtúri AFC)	30	16	4	10	114	69	+45	36	
4	Jászberényi Lehel (Note: new name: Jászberényi SzSE)	30	16	3	11	73	42	+31	35	
5	Abonyi MTE	30	14	6	10	68	65	+3	34	
6	Martfúi BDSE (Note: formerly Martfűi Cikta)	30	12	8	10	57	47	+10	32	
7	Karcagi SzTE	30	14	3	13	45	49	−4	31	
8	Tótkomlósi SzMTK (Note: formerly Tótkomlósi MTK, new name: Tótkomlósi DISz)	30	14	3	13	53	63	−10	31	
9	Nagykőrösi MSE (Note: new name: Nagykőrösi SzMSE)	30	12	3	15	49	59	−10	27	
10	Békéscsabai VSK	30	12	3	15	59	71	−12	27	
11	Mezőkovácsházi EPOSz TE (Note: formerly Mezőkovácsházi TE, new name: Mezőkovácsházi ÉDOSz)	30	12	2	16	54	65	−11	26	
12	Szarvasi Vasas (Note: formerly Szarvasi EPOSz, new name: Szarvasi SzSE)	30	11	4	15	55	69	−14	26	
13	Gyomai MTK (Note: formerly Gyomai EPOSz MTK, new name: Gyomai DISz)	30	10	6	14	46	65	−19	26	
14	Békési SzMSE (Note: formerly Békési MSE)	30	10	6	14	35	70	−35	24 (Note: 2 points deducted)	
15	Békéscsabai Agyagipar	30	8	4	18	46	53	−7	20	Relegation to Megyei Bajnokság I
16	Kisújszállási VSK	30	4	7	19	42	92	−50	15	Relegation to Megyei Bajnokság I

Notes:

Notes:

- The results of missing matches not listed in the source table have been added to the final standings.
- The group winner, Gyulai SzSE, was promoted to NB II, while the bottom two teams were relegated to the Southeast Hungarian and Central Hungarian LASz Division I, respectively.

== See also ==
- 1949–50 Magyar Kupa
- 1949–50 Nemzeti Bajnokság I
- 1949–50 Nemzeti Bajnokság II
