= 1950 Nemzeti Bajnokság II =

Nemzeti Bajnokság II
- Season: 1950
- Champions: Tatabányai Építők SK (West); Sorokosári Tetxil (Central); Sajószentpéteri Tárna (East); Szegedi Honvéd SE (South)
- Promoted: Soroksári Textil (Central); Szegedi Honvéd SE (South)
- Relegated: Székesfehérvári Építők (West); Győri VSK (West); Kaposvári ÉDOSz (West); Fűzfői Lombik (West); Viscosa Nyergesújfalu (Central); Magyar Posztó SE (Central); Magyar Acél SE (Central); Pesterzsébeti Vasas (Central); Kistext SE (East); Dunakeszi VSK (East); Nyíregyházi Lokomotív (East); Sátoraljaújhelyi Építők (East); Kiskunhalasi VSK (South); Ceglédi VSK (South); Szegedi Textil (South); Phöbus SE (South)

The 1950 Nemzeti Bajnokság II was the 51st season of the Nemzeti Bajnokság II, the second tier of the Hungarian football league.

== League table ==
=== Western group ===
Pos	Team	Pld	W	D	L	GF	GA	GD	Pts	Relegation
1	Tatabányai Építők SK (Note: Formerly known as Tatabányai MÉMOSz.)	15	10	3	2	26	12	+14	23	
2	Pécsi MESzHART Dinamó (Note: New name: Pécsújhegyi Bányász.)	15	10	2	3	37	18	+19	22	
3	Pápai Textil (Note: Formerly known as Pápai Perutz SC, new name Pápai Vörös Lobogó.)	15	9	1	5	36	23	+13	19	
4	Olajmunkás SE (Nagykanizsa) (Note: New name: Nagykanizsai Bányász.)	15	5	7	3	18	12	+6	17	
5	Szombathelyi SzMTE (Note: New name: Szombathelyi Vörös Lobogó.)	15	6	4	5	18	27	−9	16	
6	X. kerületi ÉDOSz (Note: Formerly known as Kőbányai Sörgyári DSE, new name: Kinizsi Sörgyár.)	15	6	3	6	24	20	+4	15	
7	Pécsi Bőripari Dolgozók SE (Note: Formerly known as Pécsi Bőrgyári TC, new name: Pécsi Vörös Lobogó.)	15	5	5	5	25	28	−3	15	
8	Soproni Lokomotív	15	6	2	7	30	23	+7	14	
9	Pécsi Lokomotív	15	5	4	6	21	17	+4	14	
10	ÉDOSz Lendület (Note: Formerly known as Bp. Lendület, new name: Kinizsi Dohánygyár.)	15	7	0	8	25	23	+2	14	
11	Nagykanizsai VSK (Note: New name: Nagykanizsai Lokomotív.)	15	5	4	6	30	31	−1	14	
12	Komlói SzSE (Note: New name: Komlói Bányász.)	15	4	6	5	21	29	−8	14	
13	Székesfehérvári Építők (Note: Formerly known as Székesfehérvári MDSE, were promoted to Nemzeti Bajnokság II thanks to the decision of the Hungarian Football Federation, continued in the Fejér county league.)	15	4	5	6	15	18	−3	13	Relegation to Megyei Bajnokság I
14	Győri VSK (Note: New name: Győri Lokomotív, continued in the Győr-Sopron league.)	15	4	5	6	25	35	−10	13	Relegation to Megyei Bajnokság I
15	Kaposvári ÉDOSz (Note: Formerly known as Kaposvári DSK, new name: Kaposvári Kinizsi, continued in the Somogy county league.)	15	5	1	9	28	30	−2	11	Relegation to Megyei Bajnokság I
16	Fűzfői Lombik (Note: New name: Fűzfői Szikra, continued in the Veszprém county league.)	15	1	4	10	14	47	−33	6	Relegation to Megyei Bajnokság I

=== Central group ===
Pos	Team	Pld	W	D	L	GF	GA	GD	Pts	Promotion or relegation
1	Soroksári Textil SK (Note: New name: Vörös Lobogó Sortex.)	15	8	5	2	26	13	+13	21	Promotion to Nemzeti Bajnokság I
2	Építők KSE (Note: Fások SE and MÉMOSz SE merged as Építők Központi SE, new name Bp. Építők.)	15	10	1	4	31	22	+9	21	
3	Magyar Pamut SC (Note: New name: Vörös Lobogó Magyar Pamut.)	15	8	4	3	25	24	+1	20	
4	Budapesti Gyárépítők MTE (Note: On 11 August 1950 Budafoki MTE and Bp. Gyárépítők merged as Bp. Gyárépítők.)	15	8	1	6	37	19	+18	17	
5	Ganz Vasas (Note: Formerly known as Ganz TE, new name Vasas Ganzvagon.)	15	7	3	5	32	33	−1	17	
6	III. ker. Textilmunkás (Note: New name III. ker. Vörös Lobogó.)	15	6	4	5	21	18	+3	16	
7	Elektromos Munkás SE (Note: New name Vasas Elektromos.)	15	7	2	6	34	30	+4	16	
8	Fővárosi Gázművek Lombik SE (Note: New name Szikra Gázművek.)	15	5	5	5	25	25	0	15	
9	Óbudai Építők (Note: Formerly known as Újlaki FC.)	15	6	2	7	18	16	+2	14	
10	Csepeli Papírgyári Lombik (Note: Formerly known as Csepeli Papír, new name Csepeli Szikra.)	15	6	2	7	23	24	−1	14	
11	Vörös Meteor (Note: Since the team belonged to Trade Union could participate in NBII instead of Péceli AC, new name: Vörös Meteor Nemzeti Bank.)	15	5	4	6	22	24	−2	14	
12	Váci Dolgozók TK (Note: New name Váci Vörös Lobogó.)	15	5	3	7	33	32	+1	13	
13	Viscosa Nyergesújfalu (Note: New name Nyergesújfalusi Szikra, relegated to Komárom county league I.)	15	5	3	7	21	23	−2	13	Relegation to Megyei Bajnokság I
14	Magyar Posztógyári SE (Note: New name VL Magyar Posztó, relegated to Budapest county league I.)	15	4	4	7	19	32	−13	12	Relegation to Megyei Bajnokság I
15	Magyar Acél SE (Note: New name Vasas Magyar Acél, relegated to Budapest county league I.)	15	3	5	7	17	31	−14	11	Relegation to Megyei Bajnokság I
16	Pesterzsébeti Vasas (Note: Relegated to Budapest county league I.)	15	2	2	11	19	37	−18	6	Relegation to Megyei Bajnokság I

=== Eastern group ===
Pos	Team	Pld	W	D	L	GF	GA	GD	Pts	Relegation
1	Sajószentpéteri Tárna (Note: New name Sajószentpéteri Bányász.)	15	11	3	1	44	17	+27	25	
2	Csillaghegyi Textil (Note: Were promoted thanks to the decision of the Hungarian Football Federation, new name Csillaghegyi Vörös Lobogó.)	15	9	3	3	39	21	+18	21	
3	Perecesi Tárna (Note: New name Perecesi Bányász.)	15	10	1	4	37	20	+17	21	
4	Kerámia SE (Note: New name Vasas Kerámia.)	15	8	1	6	39	20	+19	17	
5	Ózdi Vasas (Note: Formerly known as Ózdi Vasas SzIT TK.)	15	7	3	5	33	22	+11	17	
6	Salgótarjáni Vasas	15	7	2	6	36	30	+6	16	
7	Debreceni Lokomotív	15	6	3	6	25	28	−3	15	
8	Nyíregyházi Elektromos (Note: New name Nyíregyházi Vasas Elektromos.)	15	6	3	6	19	27	−8	15	
9	Miskolci Építők (Note: Formerly known as Miskolci MNVTE.)	15	6	2	7	30	32	−2	14	
10	Miskolci Lokomotív	15	5	4	6	28	31	−3	14	
11	Hatvani VSK (Note: New name Hatvani Lokomotív.)	15	5	4	6	32	36	−4	14	
12	Egri ESzTK (Note: New name Egri Fáklya.)	15	6	2	7	24	32	−8	14	
13	Kistext SE (Note: New name Vörös Lobogó Kistext, a Budapest-bajnokság I. osztályába került.)	15	5	2	8	29	36	−7	12	Relegation to Megyei Bajnokság I
14	Dunakeszi VSK (Note: New name Dunakeszi Lokomotív, relegated to Pest county league Northern group.)	15	4	3	8	29	31	−2	11	Relegation to Megyei Bajnokság I
15	Nyíregyházi Lokomotív (Note: Relegated to Szabolcs-Szatmár county league I.)	15	3	1	11	17	39	−22	7	Relegation to Megyei Bajnokság I
16	Sátoraljaújhelyi Építők (Note: Formerly known as Sátoraljaújh. Magasépítő NVTK, új neve Sátoraljaújhelyi Petőfi, a Borsod-Abaúj-Zemplén megyei bajnokságba került.)	15	3	1	11	23	62	−39	7	Relegation to Megyei Bajnokság I

=== Southern group ===
Pos	Team	Pld	W	D	L	GF	GA	GD	Pts	Promotion or relegation
1	Szegedi Honvéd SE	14	9	4	1	28	13	+15	22	Promotion to Nemzeti Bajnokság I
2	Szolnoki Lokomotív	14	9	3	2	25	12	+13	21	
3	Budapesti Lokomotív	14	8	3	3	29	11	+18	19	
4	Kelenföldi Textil (Note: Formerly known as Goldberger SE, new name Vörös Lobogó Keltex.)	14	7	4	3	24	16	+8	18	
5	Szolnoki SzMTE (Note: In June 1948 the fusion was terminated, played as Szolnoki Papirgyári Szikra in the NBII.)	14	6	4	4	21	17	+4	16	
6	Kecskeméti SzTE (Note: New name Kecskeméti Kinizsi.)	14	5	4	5	25	25	0	14	
7	Békéscsabai SzSE (Note: New name Békéscsabai Építők.)	14	6	2	6	25	27	−2	14	
8	Ceglédi SzSE (Note: On 10 March 1951 merged with Ceglédi VSK as Ceglédi Lokomotív.)	14	6	1	7	30	22	+8	13	
9	Szegedi Lokomotív	14	5	3	6	19	20	−1	13	
10	Gyulai SzSE (Note: The match against Ceglédi VSK was annulled, new name: Gyulai Építők.)	14	4	5	5	17	18	−1	13	
11	MÁVAG (Note: New name Vasas MÁVAG.)	14	3	6	5	12	17	−5	12	
12	Központi Lombik TK (Note: New name Bp. Szikra.)	14	3	4	7	15	17	−2	10	
13	Kiskunhalasi VSK (Note: New name Kiskunhalasi Lokomotív, relegated to Bács-Kiskun county league.)	14	3	3	8	18	41	−23	9	Relegation to Megyei Bajnokság I
14	Ceglédi VSK (Note: A Gyulai SzSE elleni mérkőzésének erdményét megsemmisítették, egyik csapat sem kapott pontot; 1951. 03.10. fúzió a Ceglédi SzSE-vel Ceglédi Lokomotív.)	14	2	4	8	20	26	−6	8	Relegation to Megyei Bajnokság I
15	Szegedi Textil (Note: New name Szegedi VL Kender, relegated to Csongrád county.)	14	0	4	10	15	41	−26	4	Relegation to Megyei Bajnokság I
16	Phöbus SE (Note: Merger with Elektromos MSE-be, no team competed instead of them.)	0	0	0	0	0	0	0	0	Relegation to Megyei Bajnokság I

== Promotion playoff ==
Pos	Team	Pld	W	D	L	GF	GA	GD	Pts
1	Soroksári Textil	3	2	1	0	5	2	+3	5
2	Szegedi Honvéd SE	3	2	1	0	8	4	+4	5
3	Tatabányai Építők SK	3	1	0	2	6	5	+1	2
4	Sajószentpéteri Tárna	3	0	0	3	3	11	−8	0

== See also ==
- 1950 Magyar Kupa
- 1950 Nemzeti Bajnokság I
