= 1953 Nemzeti Bajnokság II =

Nemzeti Bajnokság II
- Season: 1953
- Champions: Pécsi Lokomotív (West); Szikra Gázművek (Central); Diósgyőri Vasas (East); Vasas Izzó (South)
- Promoted: Diósgyőri Vasas (East); Vasas Izzó (South)
- Relegated: Several

The 1953 Nemzeti Bajnokság II was the 54th season of the Nemzeti Bajnokság II, the second tier of the Hungarian football league.

== League table ==
=== Western group ===
Pos	Team	Pld	W	D	L	GF	GA	GD	Pts	Relegation
1	Pécsi Lokomotív	30	18	3	9	71	33	+38	39	
2	Komlói Bányász	30	18	3	9	74	43	+31	39	
3	Pápai Vörös Lobogó	30	16	6	8	61	39	+22	38	
4	Kőbányai Dózsa	30	17	3	10	72	37	+35	37	
5	Pécsi Dózsa	30	15	6	9	58	41	+17	36	
6	Csillaghegyi Vörös Lobogó	30	15	6	9	47	38	+9	36	
7	Várpalotai Bányász SK	30	12	7	11	43	41	+2	31	
8	Pécsújhegyi Bányász	30	13	3	14	64	75	−11	29	
9	Győri Lokomotív	30	12	4	14	50	55	−5	28	
10	Nagykanizsai Bányász	30	11	6	13	43	48	−5	28	
11	Szombathelyi Honvéd	30	10	7	13	58	63	−5	27	
12	Szombathelyi Vörös Lobogó	30	9	6	15	43	62	−19	24	
13	Tatabányai Építők	30	10	4	16	45	69	−24	24	
14	Pécsi Vörös Lobogó	30	9	5	16	36	66	−30	23	
15	Zalaegerszegi Vörös Meteor	30	7	8	15	32	57	−25	22	Relegation to Nemzeti Bajnokság III
16	Pécsbányatelepi Bányász	30	8	3	19	47	77	−30	19	Relegation to Nemzeti Bajnokság III

=== Central group ===
Pos	Team	Pld	W	D	L	GF	GA	GD	Pts	Relegation
1	Szikra Gázművek	30	21	4	5	67	27	+40	46	
2	Tatabányai Bányász	30	19	6	5	61	24	+37	44	
3	Pesterzsébeti Vasas	30	18	7	5	56	33	+23	43	
4	Kinizsi Dohánygyár	30	15	7	8	56	36	+20	37	
5	Váci Vörös Lobogó	30	13	6	11	45	45	0	32	
6	Szikra Kénsavgyár	30	9	10	11	58	59	−1	28	
7	Budapesti Vörös Meteor	30	10	7	13	58	60	−2	27	
8	Budapesti Gyárépítők	30	10	7	13	45	53	−8	27	
9	Vörös Lobogó Duna-cipőgyár	30	10	7	13	42	52	−10	27	
10	Budapesti Haladás	30	11	4	15	39	42	−3	26	
11	Kinizsi Sörgyár	30	10	6	14	35	49	−14	26	
12	Vasas Ganzvagon	30	9	7	14	40	53	−13	25	
13	Esztergomi Vasas	30	9	7	14	32	47	−15	25	
14	Vasas MÁVAG	30	7	9	14	47	61	−14	23	
15	Csepeli Szikra	30	9	5	16	31	50	−19	23	Relegation to Nemzeti Bajnokság III
16	Budapesti Építők	30	8	5	17	41	62	−21	21	Relegation to Nemzeti Bajnokság III

=== Eastern group ===
Pos	Team	Pld	W	D	L	GF	GA	GD	Pts	Promotion or relegation
1	Diósgyőri Vasas	30	22	5	3	113	30	+83	49	Promotion to Nemzeti Bajnokság I
2	Miskolci Honvéd	30	18	5	7	70	35	+35	41	
3	Ózdi Vasas	30	14	10	6	61	33	+28	38	
4	Perecesi Bányász	30	16	5	9	73	44	+29	37	
5	Debreceni Lokomotív	30	15	7	8	49	46	+3	37	
6	Debreceni Honvéd	30	14	6	10	64	47	+17	34	
7	Egri Fáklya	30	13	8	9	67	58	+9	34	
8	Miskolci Lokomotív	30	11	10	9	57	52	+5	32	
9	Nyíregyházi Építők	30	11	7	12	44	41	+3	29	
10	Budapesti Lokomotív	30	12	4	14	54	50	+4	28	
11	Sajószentpéteri Bányász	30	9	10	11	46	58	−12	28	
12	Salgótarjáni Vasas	30	10	7	13	53	57	−4	27	
13	Miskolci Építők	30	9	4	17	50	73	−23	22	
14	Nagybátonyi Bányász	30	7	5	18	45	95	−50	19	
15	Gyöngyösi Építők	30	6	7	17	34	75	−41	19	Relegation to Nemzeti Bajnokság III
16	Lőrinci Vasas	30	2	2	26	31	117	−86	6	Relegation to Nemzeti Bajnokság III

=== Southern group ===
Pos	Team	Pld	W	D	L	GF	GA	GD	Pts	Promotion or relegation
1	Vasas Izzó	30	20	8	2	67	28	+39	48	Promotion to Nemzeti Bajnokság I
2	Légierő SK	30	19	6	5	63	23	+40	44	
3	Budapesti Előre	30	14	9	7	52	37	+15	37	
4	Békéscsabai Építők	30	15	3	12	41	41	0	33	
5	Vasas Dinamó	30	10	11	9	41	44	−3	31	
6	Szegedi Petőfi	30	10	10	10	47	46	+1	30	
7	Budapesti Szikra	30	12	6	12	39	40	−1	30	
8	Szolnoki Lokomotív	30	9	10	11	45	47	−2	28	
9	Orosházi Kinizsi	30	10	8	12	39	42	−3	28	
10	Kecskeméti Kinizsi	30	10	8	12	35	43	−8	28	
11	Kőbányai Lokomotív	30	8	10	12	36	40	−4	26	
12	Ceglédi Lokomotív	30	9	8	13	34	53	−19	26	
13	Szegedi Lokomotív	30	10	5	15	39	53	−14	25	
14	Gyulai Építők	30	9	6	15	42	43	−1	24	
15	Kiskunfélegyházi Vasas	30	7	8	15	43	52	−9	22	Relegation to Nemzeti Bajnokság III
16	Makói Vasas	30	5	10	15	30	61	−31	20	Relegation to Nemzeti Bajnokság III

== Promotion playoff ==
Pos	Team	Pld	W	D	L	GF	GA	GD	Pts
1	Diósgyőri Vasas	3	3	0	0	8	2	+6	6
2	Vasas Izzó	3	2	0	1	6	2	+4	4
3	Szikra Gázművek	3	1	0	2	4	8	−4	2
4	Pécsi Lokomotív	3	0	0	3	2	8	−6	0

== See also ==
- 1953 Nemzeti Bajnokság I
