= 1952 Nemzeti Bajnokság II =

Nemzeti Bajnokság II
- Season: 1952
- Champions: Vörös Lobogó Sor tex (West); Sztálin Vasmű Építók (Central); Miskolci Honvéd (East); Vasas Izzó (South)
- Promoted: Vörös Lobogó Sor tex (West); Sztálin Vasmű Építók (Central)
- Relegated: Székesfehérvári Építók (West); Kaposvári Vasas (West); Soproni Lokomotív (West); Nagykanizsai Lokomotív (West); Vörös Lobogó Textilfestó (Central; Vasas Elektromos (Central; Előre Autótaxi (Central); Vasas Beloianiszgyár (Central); Debreceni Dózsa (East); Sátoraljaújhelyi Petőfi (East); Dunakeszi Vagongyár Vasas (East); Hatvani Lokomotív (East); Vörös Lobogó Keltex (South); Pénzügyőrök SE (South); Vörös Lobogó Kistext (South); Szolnoki Szikra (South)

The 1952 Nemzeti Bajnokság II was the 53rd season of the Nemzeti Bajnokság II, the second tier of the Hungarian football league.

== League table ==
=== Western group ===
| Pos | Team | Pld | W | D | L | GF | GA | GD | Pts | Promotion or relegation |
|---|---|---|---|---|---|---|---|---|---|---|
| 1 | Vörös Lobogó SorTex | 34 | 27 | 3 | 4 | 74 | 20 | +54 | 57 | Promotion to Nemzeti Bajnokság I |
| 2 | Tatabányai Bányász | 34 | 21 | 9 | 4 | 87 | 32 | +55 | 51 | |
| 3 | Pápai Vörös Lobogó | 34 | 18 | 5 | 11 | 60 | 49 | +11 | 41 | |
| 4 | Szombathelyi Vörös Lobogó | 34 | 18 | 4 | 12 | 72 | 72 | 0 | 40 | |
| 5 | Várpalotai Bányász SK | 34 | 15 | 9 | 10 | 46 | 36 | +10 | 39 | |
| 6 | Komlói Bányász | 34 | 18 | 2 | 14 | 69 | 54 | +15 | 38 | |
| 7 | Nagykanizsai Bányász | 34 | 16 | 4 | 14 | 57 | 49 | +8 | 36 | |
| 8 | Pécsújhegyi Bányász | 34 | 13 | 9 | 12 | 70 | 57 | +13 | 35 | |
| 9 | Győri Lokomotív | 34 | 15 | 4 | 15 | 60 | 57 | +3 | 34 | |
| 10 | Veszprémi Bástya (Note: From 26 February 1953, Kőbányai Bástya, and then from 27 August 1953, Kőbányai Dózsa.) | 34 | 14 | 6 | 14 | 61 | 63 | −2 | 34 | |
| 11 | Pécsi Vörös Lobogó | 34 | 13 | 5 | 16 | 58 | 63 | −5 | 31 | |
| 12 | Pécsbányatelepi Bányász | 34 | 12 | 6 | 16 | 53 | 66 | −13 | 30 | |
| 13 | Zalaegerszegi Vörös Meteor | 34 | 12 | 6 | 16 | 51 | 73 | −22 | 30 | |
| 14 | Tatabányai Építők | 34 | 12 | 4 | 18 | 55 | 68 | −13 | 28 | |
| 15 | Székesfehérvári Építők | 34 | 10 | 6 | 18 | 58 | 74 | −16 | 26 | Relegation to Nemzeti Bajnokság III |
| 16 | Kaposvári Vasas | 34 | 10 | 5 | 19 | 51 | 80 | −29 | 25 | Relegation to Nemzeti Bajnokság III |
| 17 | Soproni Lokomotív | 34 | 6 | 7 | 21 | 48 | 75 | −27 | 19 | Relegation to Nemzeti Bajnokság III |
| 18 | Nagykanizsai Lokomotív | 34 | 5 | 8 | 21 | 43 | 85 | −42 | 18 | Relegation to Nemzeti Bajnokság III |

=== Central group ===
| Pos | Team | Pld | W | D | L | GF | GA | GD | Pts | Promotion or relegation |
|---|---|---|---|---|---|---|---|---|---|---|
| 1 | Sztálin Vasmű Építők (Note: The former Dunai Vasmű Építők.) | 34 | 32 | 2 | 0 | 145 | 31 | +114 | 66 | Promotion to Nemzeti Bajnokság I |
| 2 | Szikra Gázművek | 34 | 21 | 7 | 6 | 73 | 45 | +28 | 49 | |
| 3 | Csillaghegyi Vörös Lobogó | 34 | 18 | 8 | 8 | 71 | 39 | +32 | 44 | |
| 4 | Budapesti Gyárépítők | 34 | 18 | 4 | 12 | 64 | 55 | +9 | 40 | |
| 5 | Váci Vörös Lobogó | 34 | 15 | 7 | 12 | 60 | 48 | +12 | 37 | |
| 6 | Szikra Hungária Kénsavgyár (Note: New name is Szikra Kénsavgyár.) | 34 | 16 | 4 | 14 | 63 | 70 | −7 | 36 | |
| 7 | Vasas Ganzvagon | 34 | 13 | 9 | 12 | 54 | 50 | +4 | 35 | |
| 8 | Vasas MÁVAG | 34 | 9 | 15 | 10 | 35 | 44 | −9 | 33 | |
| 9 | Kinizsi Dohánygyár | 34 | 12 | 7 | 15 | 58 | 52 | +6 | 31 | |
| 10 | Kinizsi Sörgyár | 34 | 11 | 8 | 15 | 54 | 59 | −5 | 30 | |
| 11 | Csepeli Szikra | 34 | 10 | 10 | 14 | 33 | 38 | −5 | 30 | |
| 12 | Vörös Lobogó Textilfestő (Note: The former III. ker. Vörös Lobogó; the match between Autótaxi and VL Textilfestő was annulled, none of the teams received points. The VL Textilfestő was excluded from the competition due to match fixing, then it was relegated to the Budapest-bajnokság I.) | 34 | 9 | 12 | 13 | 56 | 66 | −10 | 30 | Relegation to Nemzeti Bajnokság III |
| 13 | Vörös Lobogó Duna-cipőgyár (Note: The former IV. ker. Vörös Lobogó.) | 34 | 10 | 10 | 14 | 35 | 48 | −13 | 30 | |
| 14 | Budapesti Vörös Meteor (Note: The former Vörös Meteor Nemzeti Bank, and then Vörös Meteor Egyetértés MNB.) | 34 | 11 | 7 | 16 | 50 | 74 | −24 | 29 | |
| 15 | Vasas Elektromos | 34 | 9 | 10 | 15 | 43 | 53 | −10 | 28 | Relegation to Nemzeti Bajnokság III |
| 16 | Előre Autótaxi (Note: The match between Előre Autótaxi and VL Textilfestő was annulled. None of the teams received points.) | 34 | 8 | 11 | 15 | 42 | 52 | −10 | 27 | Relegation to Nemzeti Bajnokság III |
| 17 | Vasas Beloiannisz-gyár (Note: Former Vasas Standard.) | 34 | 5 | 9 | 20 | 39 | 89 | −50 | 19 | Relegation to Nemzeti Bajnokság III |
| 18 | Budapesti Haladás (Note: Was not relegated, replaced VL Textilfestő.) | 34 | 5 | 6 | 23 | 43 | 105 | −62 | 16 | |

=== Eastern group ===
| Pos | Team | Pld | W | D | L | GF | GA | GD | Pts | Relegation |
|---|---|---|---|---|---|---|---|---|---|---|
| 1 | Miskolci Honvéd | 34 | 22 | 7 | 5 | 100 | 41 | +59 | 51 | |
| 2 | Ózdi Vasas | 34 | 22 | 7 | 5 | 74 | 33 | +41 | 51 | |
| 3 | Budapesti Lokomotív | 34 | 22 | 5 | 7 | 88 | 51 | +37 | 49 | |
| 4 | Debreceni Honvéd | 34 | 20 | 5 | 9 | 90 | 51 | +39 | 45 | |
| 5 | Sajószentpéteri Bányász | 34 | 18 | 5 | 11 | 64 | 57 | +7 | 41 | |
| 6 | Miskolci Lokomotív | 34 | 17 | 6 | 11 | 70 | 50 | +20 | 40 | |
| 7 | Vasas BVK (Note: New name from 5 February 1953 Vasas Dinamó.) | 34 | 13 | 12 | 9 | 44 | 40 | +4 | 38 | |
| 8 | Miskolci Építők | 34 | 12 | 13 | 9 | 44 | 37 | +7 | 37 | |
| 9 | Perecesi Bányász | 34 | 15 | 4 | 15 | 57 | 61 | −4 | 34 | |
| 10 | Nyíregyházi Építők (Note: Merger with Nyíregyházi Vasas Elektromost in November 1951.) | 34 | 13 | 7 | 14 | 62 | 71 | −9 | 33 | |
| 11 | Salgótarjáni Vasas | 34 | 11 | 9 | 14 | 60 | 63 | −3 | 31 | |
| 12 | Egri Fáklya | 34 | 12 | 7 | 15 | 57 | 67 | −10 | 31 | |
| 13 | Debreceni Lokomotív | 34 | 12 | 5 | 17 | 55 | 69 | −14 | 29 | |
| 14 | Gyöngyösi Építők | 34 | 11 | 6 | 17 | 56 | 62 | −6 | 28 | |
| 15 | Debreceni Dózsa | 34 | 9 | 4 | 21 | 58 | 68 | −10 | 22 | Relegation to Nemzeti Bajnokság III |
| 16 | Sátoraljaújhelyi Petőfi | 34 | 4 | 10 | 20 | 37 | 95 | −58 | 18 | Relegation to Nemzeti Bajnokság III |
| 17 | Dunakeszi Vagongyári Vasas (Note: Former Dunakeszi Lokomotív, new name Dunakeszi Vasas.) | 34 | 6 | 5 | 23 | 43 | 94 | −51 | 17 | Relegation to Nemzeti Bajnokság III |
| 18 | Hatvani Lokomotív | 34 | 5 | 7 | 22 | 26 | 75 | −49 | 17 | Relegation to Nemzeti Bajnokság III |

=== Southern group ===
| Pos | Team | Pld | W | D | L | GF | GA | GD | Pts | Relegation |
|---|---|---|---|---|---|---|---|---|---|---|
| 1 | Vasas Izzó | 34 | 25 | 6 | 3 | 107 | 25 | +82 | 56 | |
| 2 | Szegedi Petőfi | 34 | 21 | 7 | 6 | 66 | 27 | +39 | 49 | |
| 3 | Békéscsabai Építők | 34 | 19 | 10 | 5 | 69 | 35 | +34 | 48 | |
| 4 | Budapesti Előre | 34 | 20 | 4 | 10 | 84 | 48 | +36 | 44 | |
| 5 | Gyulai Építők | 34 | 18 | 5 | 11 | 70 | 52 | +18 | 41 | |
| 6 | Szolnoki Lokomotív | 34 | 12 | 12 | 10 | 53 | 39 | +14 | 36 | |
| 7 | Kecskeméti Kinizsi | 34 | 15 | 5 | 14 | 44 | 60 | −16 | 35 | |
| 8 | Ceglédi Lokomotív | 34 | 13 | 8 | 13 | 48 | 53 | −5 | 34 | |
| 9 | Orosházi Kinizsi | 34 | 13 | 7 | 14 | 47 | 60 | −13 | 33 | |
| 10 | Kőbányai Lokomotív | 34 | 12 | 9 | 13 | 44 | 61 | −17 | 33 | |
| 11 | Budapesti Szikra | 34 | 12 | 6 | 16 | 45 | 72 | −27 | 30 | |
| 12 | Budapesti Építők | 34 | 8 | 13 | 13 | 54 | 58 | −4 | 29 | |
| 13 | Kiskunfélegyházi Vasas | 34 | 12 | 4 | 18 | 50 | 71 | −21 | 28 | |
| 14 | Szegedi Lokomotív | 34 | 10 | 8 | 16 | 30 | 51 | −21 | 28 | |
| 15 | Vörös Lobogó Keltex | 34 | 9 | 7 | 18 | 39 | 54 | −15 | 25 | Relegation to Nemzeti Bajnokság III |
| 16 | Pénzügyőrök SE | 34 | 8 | 7 | 19 | 41 | 62 | −21 | 23 | Relegation to Nemzeti Bajnokság III |
| 17 | Vörös Lobogó Kistext | 34 | 6 | 8 | 20 | 41 | 69 | −28 | 20 | Relegation to Nemzeti Bajnokság III |
| 18 | Szolnoki Szikra (Note: Former Szolnoki Papírgyári Szikra.) | 34 | 5 | 10 | 19 | 27 | 62 | −35 | 20 | Relegation to Nemzeti Bajnokság III |

== Promotion playoffs ==
| Pos | Team | Pld | W | D | L | GF | GA | GD | Pts |
|---|---|---|---|---|---|---|---|---|---|
| 1 | Sztálin Vasmű Építők | 3 | 1 | 2 | 0 | 6 | 5 | +1 | 4 |
| 2 | Vörös Lobogó Sortex | 3 | 1 | 1 | 1 | 7 | 4 | +3 | 3 |
| 3 | Vasas Izzó | 3 | 1 | 1 | 1 | 5 | 5 | 0 | 3 |
| 4 | Miskolci Honvéd | 3 | 0 | 2 | 1 | 4 | 8 | −4 | 2 |

== See also ==
- 1951–52 Magyar Kupa
- 1952 Nemzeti Bajnokság I
