= 1949–50 Nemzeti Bajnokság II =

Nemzeti Bajnokság II
- Season: 1949–50
- Champions: Tatabányai Tárna (West); Bőripari Dolgozók SE (Central); Diósgyőri Vasas (East); Szegedi Szakszevezeti MTE (South)
- Promoted: Tatabányai Tárna (West); Bőripari Dolgozók SE (Central); Diósgyőri Vasas (East); Szegedi Szakszevezeti MTE (South)

The 1949–50 Nemzeti Bajnokság II was the 50th season of the Nemzeti Bajnokság II, the second tier of the Hungarian football league.

== League table ==
=== Western group ===
Pos	Team	Pld	W	D	L	GF	GA	GD	Pts	Promotion or relegation
1	Tatabányai Tárna (Note: Formerly known as Tatabányai SC.)	30	23	2	5	87	30	+57	48	Promotion to Nemzeti Bajnokság I
2	Pécsi BTC (Note: New name Pécsi Bőripari Dolgozók SE.)	30	21	1	8	72	45	+27	43	
3	Pápai Perutz SC (Note: New name Pápai Textil.)	30	19	4	7	67	36	+31	42	
4	Pécsi MESZHART Dinamó	30	18	2	10	79	50	+29	38	
5	Budapesti Lendület (Note: On 26 January 1950, Dohánygyári Lendület, Óbudai Lendület, Beváltó Lendület, Központi Lendület merged as Bp. Lendület néven, later as ÉDOSz Lendület.)	30	15	3	12	63	63	0	33	
6	Kaposvári DSK (Note: On 31 August 1949, Kaposvári MTE, Kaposvári Vasutas, Kaposvári Rákóczi AC merged as Kaposvári Dolgozók SK.)	30	13	6	11	62	55	+7	32	
7	Kőbányai Sörgyári DSE (Note: Formerly known as Kőbányai Polgári Sör SE, merged with Dreher SE, new name X.ker. ÉDOSz.)	30	13	4	13	51	53	−2	30	
8	Győri Vasutas SK	30	12	5	13	48	53	−5	29	
9	Pécsi Lokomotív	30	13	2	15	67	63	+4	28	
10	Magyar Pamut SC	30	12	2	16	66	63	+3	26	
11	Soproni Lokomotív (Note: Formerly known as Soproni Vasutas SE.)	30	7	10	13	52	64	−12	24	
12	Postás SE (Note: Merger with Szentlőrinci AC, new name from February 1950 Postás SE néven.)	30	9	5	16	42	62	−20	23	
13	Nagykanizsai Vasutas SK (Note: Formerly known as Nagykanizsai Vasutas TE.)	30	10	3	17	46	82	−36	23	
14	Székesfehérvári Lokomotív	30	8	6	16	51	81	−30	22	Relegation
15	Várpalotai Tárna (Note: Formerly known as Várpalotai Tárna.)	30	8	5	17	48	67	−19	21	Relegation
16	Szakmaközi Soproni FAC (Note: Formerly known as Soproni FAC, On 9 August 1950, merger with Soproni Selyemipar as Soproni Dolgozók Sport Egylete.)	30	7	4	19	54	88	−34	18	Relegation

=== Central group ===
Pos	Team	Pld	W	D	L	GF	GA	GD	Pts	Promotion or relegation
1	Bőripari Dolgozók SE (Note: Wolfner SE were created through the merger of UMTE and Pannónia-UTSE.)	30	24	1	5	86	34	+52	49	Promotion to Nemzeti Bajnokság I
2	Budafoki MTE (Note: On 11 August 1950, merger with Bp. Gyárépítőkkel.)	30	20	5	5	82	40	+42	45	
3	Pesterzsébeti Vasas (Note: Formerly known as Erzsébeti MTK.)	30	15	6	9	48	44	+4	36	
4	Péceli SzIT AC (Note: Formerly known as Péceli AC, later Péceli MÁV AC. In autumn 1950, it was replaced by Vörös Meteor SE and participated in the Nemzeti Bajnokság III as Péceli SzSE néven.)	30	14	7	9	66	50	+16	35	
5	Fővárosi Gázművek Lombik SE (Note: Formerly known as Gázgyár.)	30	12	9	9	63	51	+12	33	
6	Goldberger SE (Note: New name Kelenföldi Textil (Keltex).)	30	12	7	11	58	48	+10	31	
7	Ganz TE (Note: New name Ganz Vasas.)	30	12	7	11	48	48	0	31	
8	III. ker. Textilmunkás (Note: Formerly known as III. ker. TVE.)	30	13	3	14	51	53	−2	29	
9	Magyar Viscosa SE	30	12	4	14	47	53	−6	28	
10	Elektromos MSE	30	11	6	13	61	70	−9	28	
11	Magyar Acél SE	30	9	8	13	47	62	−15	26	
12	Váci DTK	30	10	5	15	50	66	−16	25	
13	Fások SE (Note: Merger with Ferencvárosi SE and Fások SC and fusion with MÉMOSz as Építők Központi SE.)	30	10	4	16	58	62	−4	24	Relegation
14	ÉDOSz Húsos (Note: Formerly known as Húsos SC.)	30	7	7	16	43	61	−18	21	Relegation
15	Tokodi ÜMSE (Note: Formerly known as Tokodi Üveggyári SC.)	30	8	4	18	46	74	−28	20	Relegation
16	Autótaxi MSC (Note: On 18 April 1950, Autótaxi SC and Pestújhelyi MSC merged as Autótaxi MSC.)	30	7	5	18	55	93	−38	19	Relegation

=== Eastern group ===
Pos	Team	Pld	W	D	L	GF	GA	GD	Pts	Promotion or relegation
1	Diósgyőri Vasas (Note: Formerly known as Diósgyőri VTK.)	30	20	4	6	80	37	+43	44	Promotion to Nemzeti Bajnokság I
2	Kerámia SE	30	19	4	7	68	46	+22	42	
3	Ózdi Vasas SzIT TK (Note: New name Ózdi Vasas.)	30	17	7	6	65	32	+33	41	
4	Miskolci MNVTE	30	17	7	6	82	54	+28	41	
5	Miskolci Lokomotív	30	17	5	8	77	41	+36	39	
6	Sajószentpéteri Tárna (Note: Formerly known as Sajószentpéteri BTK.)	30	15	6	9	54	39	+15	36	
7	Kistext SE	30	16	3	11	61	36	+25	35	
8	Perecesi Tárna TK (Note: Formerly known as Perecesi TK, new name Perecesi Tárna.)	30	14	6	10	64	50	+14	34	
9	Nyíregyházi Lokomotív (Nyíregyházi VSK) (Note: Formerly known as Nyíregyházi Vasutas SE.)	30	11	7	12	63	61	+2	29	
10	Sátoraljaújhelyi MNVTK (Sátoraljaújhelyi TK) (Note: Formerly known as Sátoraljaújhelyi TK, new name Sátoraljaújhelyi TK.)	30	11	4	15	80	65	+15	26	
11	Salgótarjáni Vasas	30	9	6	15	46	60	−14	24	
12	MÁVAG	30	8	7	15	45	77	−32	23	
13	Hatvani Vasutas SK (Note: Formerly known as Hatvani Vasutas SE.)	30	6	7	17	42	68	−26	19	
14	Mátészalkai DTK	30	6	5	19	47	84	−37	17	Relegation
15	Debreceni Honvéd (Note: Adopted the department of Debreceni SzMTE.)	30	7	3	20	34	81	−47	17	Relegation
16	Kisvárdai Vasas (Note: Formerly known as Kisvárdai Össz-szakszervezeti SE.)	30	4	6	20	33	110	−77	14	Relegation

=== Southern group ===
Pos	Team	Pld	W	D	L	GF	GA	GD	Pts	Promotion or relegation
1	Szegedi Szakszervezeti MTE (Note: Merger with Szeged AK and Szegedi MTE.)	30	21	5	4	93	30	+63	47	Promotion to Nemzeti Bajnokság I
2	Szolnoki Lokomotív	30	19	8	3	78	29	+49	46	
3	Budapesti Lokomotív	30	18	7	5	79	35	+44	43	
4	Békéscsabai Szakszervezeti SE	30	15	6	9	69	54	+15	36	
5	Kecskeméti Szakszervezeti TE (Note: Merger with Kecskeméti AC and Kecskeméti MTE.)	30	15	3	12	45	52	−7	33	
6	Központi Lombik TK	30	11	9	10	42	47	−5	31	
7	Ceglédi Szakszervezeti SE (Note: Formerly known as Ceglédi VAOSz.)	30	12	6	12	55	47	+8	30	
8	Szegedi Lokomotív	30	10	8	12	31	32	−1	28	
9	Szolnoki Szakmaközi MTE (Note: Formerly known as Szolnoki MTE.)	30	10	7	13	49	56	−7	27	
10	MÉMOSZ SE (Note: Merger with Fások SE as Építők Központi SE.)	30	11	4	15	47	61	−14	26	
11	Szegedi Textil (Note: Formerly known as Újszegedi TC.)	30	11	4	15	52	68	−16	26	
12	Kiskunhalasi VSK	30	10	4	16	52	81	−29	24	
13	Phöbus SE (Note: Joined Elektromos MSE.)	30	8	7	15	32	53	−21	23	
14	Makó Vasas SE (Makói Vasutas SK)	30	7	7	16	43	73	−30	21	Relegation
15	Magyar Textil SE	30	8	4	18	48	72	−24	20	Relegation
16	Orosházi Szakszervezeti MTK	30	7	5	18	38	63	−25	19	Relegation

== See also ==
- 1949–50 Nemzeti Bajnokság I
