= Duna SK =

Hungarian football club

- Founded: 1949
- Ground: Duna-Cipő Pálya, Budapest
- Capacity: 1,000
- League: BLSZ III

Duna SK is a Hungarian football club from Budapest.

== History ==
Under the name Bőripari DSE, Duna SK debuted in the 1950 season of the Hungarian League and finished fifteenth.

== Name changes ==
- 1949–1951: Bőripari Dolgozók Sport Egyesülete
- 1951–1952: IV. ker. Vörös Lobogó SK
- 1952–1957: Vörös Lobogó Duna-cipőgyár
- 1996– : Duna SK

== Honours ==
=== League ===
- Nemzeti Bajnokság II:
  - Winners (1): 1949–50

== Seasons ==
The table below shows Duna SK's seasons.

Season	Tier	Club's name	Position	Pts
1949–50	2	Bőripari Dolgozók SE	1 / 16	49
1950	1	Bőripari DSE	15 / 16	7
1951	2	IV. kerületi Vörös Lobogó	4 / 14	29
1952	2	Vörös Lobogó Duna-cipőgyár	13 / 18	30
1953	2	Vörös Lobogó Duna-cipőgyár	9 / 16	27
1954	2	Vörös Lobogó Duna-cipőgyár	9 / 16	29
1955	3	Vörös Lobogó Duna-cipő	3 / 16	44
1956	3	Vörös Lobogó Duna-cipőgyár	5 / 14	29
1957	3	Duna-cipőgyár SK	2 / 8	18
1957–58	3	Duna-cipőgyári SK	13 / 16	23
1958–59	4	Duna Cipőgyár	11 / 16	22
1959–60	4	Újpesti Bőr	16 / 16	12
1960–61	5	Újpesti Bőripar	4 / 16	37
1961–62	5	Duna Cipőgyár	1 / 16	52
1962–63	4	Duna Cipő	7 / 16	31
1963	5	Duna Cipőgyár	6 / 16	17
1964	5	Duna Cipőgyár	8 / 16	29
1965	5	Duna Cipő	3 / 14	33
1966	5	Duna Cipő	6 / 14	26
1967	5	Duna Cipőgyár	7 / 16	32
1968	5	Duna Cipő	12 / 18	35
1969	5	Duna Cipőgyár SK	14 / 18	29
1970	5	Duna Cipőgyár	1 / 16	24
1970–71	5	Duna Cipőgyár SE	4 / 16	40
1971–72	5	Duna Cipőgyár	8 / 16	31
1972–73	5	Duna Cipőgyár	6 / 16	33
1973–74	5	Duna Cipő	3 / 16	36
1974–75	5	Duna Cipőgyár	12 / 16	26
1975–76	5	Duna Cipőgyár	10 / 16	29
1976–77	5	Duna Cipőgyár SK	10 / 16	28
1977–78	5	Duna Cipőgyár	13 / 16	25
1978–79	4	Duna Cipőgyár	8 / 16	22
1979–80	4	Duna Cipőgyár	15 / 16	18
1980–81	5	Duna Cipő SK	12 / 15	21
1981–82	6	Duna Cipő	8 / 16	28
1985–86	5	Duna Cipő SK	6 / 16	34
1986–87	5	Duna Cipő SK	8 / 16	28
1988–89	5	Duna Cipő	9 / 16	29
1989–90	5	Duna Cipő	10 / 16	37
1990–91	5	Duna Cipő	13 / 16	22
1991–92	5	Duna Cipő SK	9 / 16	28
1992–93	5	Duna Cipő SK	10 / 16	27
1993–94	5	Duna Cipő SK	3 / 16	36
1994–95	5	Duna Cipő SK	3 / 16	62
1995–96	5	Duna Cipő SK	3 / 16	50
1996–97	5	Duna SK	5 / 14	49
1997–98	6	Duna SK	5 / 16	61
1998–99	6	Duna SK	3 / 16	64
1999–00	6	Duna SK	10 / 16	34
2000–01	6	Duna SK	7 / 16	43
2001–02	6	Duna SK	2 / 16	69
2002–03	5	Duna SK	11 / 16	35
2003–04	5	Duna SK	9 / 16	37
2004–05	5	Duna SK	12 / 16	33
2005–06	4	Duna SK	9 / 16	37
2006–07	4	Duna SK	10 / 18	46
2007–08	4	Duna SK	14 / 18	39
2008–09	5	Duna SK	9 / 16	40
2009–10	5	Duna SK	13 / 16	28
2010–11	5	Duna SK	5 / 16	46
2011–12	5	Duna SK	13 / 16	28
2012–13	5	Duna SK	14 / 16	19
2013–14	6	Duna SK	4 / 14	50
2014–15	6	Duna SK	9 / 14	35
2015–16	6	Duna SK	4 / 14	51
2016–17	6	Duna SK	3 / 14	56
2017–18	6	Duna SK	10 / 14	30
2018–19	6	Duna SK	4 / 14	51
2019–20	6	Duna SK	9 / 14	18
2020–21	6	Duna SK	4 / 14	51
2021–22	5	Duna SK	7 / 14	39
2022–23	5	Duna SK	14 / 14	11
2023–24	6	Duna SK	15 / 16	15
2024–25	7	Duna SK	2 / 12	56
2025–26	6	Duna SK	14 / 14	13
