= Kiskunhalasi VSE =

Hungarian football club

- Full name: Kiskunhalasi Vasutas Sport Egyesület
Home colours

Kiskunhalasi Vasutas Sport Egyesület is a defunct professional football club based in Kiskunhalas, Hungary.

== History ==
Kiskunhalasi VSE won the 1948–49 Nemzeti Bajnokság III season and gained promotion to the second division. The club spent two consecutive seasons in the second division. In the 1949–50 Nemzeti Bajnokság II, Kiskunhalas finished in the 12th position and remained in the second division. However, in the 1950 Nemzeti Bajnokság II season, Kiskunhalas finished in the 13th position and were relegated to the fourth division.

== Name changes ==
- Kiskunhalasi Vasutas Sport Egyesület: ? – 1949
- Kiskunhalasi Vasutas SK: 1949 – 1951
- Kiskunhalasi Lokomotív SK: 1951 – 1955
- Kiskunhalasi Törekvés: 1955 – 1957
- 1957: merger with Kiskunhalasi Spartacus
- Kiskunhalasi MÁV: 1957 – 1957
- 1957: merger with Kiskunhalasi Dózsa
- Kiskunhalasi MÁV Határőrök MTC: 1957 – 1957
- 1957: split
- Kiskunhalasi MÁV SK: 1957 – ?

== Honours ==
=== League ===
- Nemzeti Bajnokság III:
  - Winners (1): 1948–49

== Seasons ==
The highest league that Kiskunhalasi VSE have ever played was the second division.

Season	Tier	Club's name	Position	Pts
1975–76	6	Kiskunhalasi MÁV	0 / 18	
1974–75	5	Kiskunhalasi MÁV SK	14 / 16	22
1973–74	6	Kiskunhalasi MÁV	6 / 16	33
1972–73	6	Kiskunhalasi MÁV	9 / 16	29
1971–72	6	Kiskunhalasi MÁV	3 / 16	35
1970–71	5	Kiskunhalasi MÁV	12 / 16	28
1970	5	Kiskunhalasi MÁV SE	8 / 16	14
1969	5	Kiskunhalasi MÁV	11 / 16	26
1968	5	Kiskunhalasi MÁV	7 / 18	36
1967	4	Kiskunhalasi MÁV	16 / 16	17
1966	5	Kiskunhalasi MÁV	1 / 14	39
1965	5	Kiskunhalasi MÁV	11 / 14	16
1964	5	Kiskunhalasi MÁV	15 / 16	15
1963	5	Kiskunhalasi MÁV	14 / 14	6
1962–63	4	Kiskunhalasi MÁV	8 / 16	27
1961–62	4	Kiskunhalasi MÁV	2 / 17	40
1960–61	4	Kiskunhalasi MÁV	2 / 16	45
1959–60	4	Kiskunhalasi MÁV	5 / 16	35
1958–59	4	Kiskunhalasi MÁV	3 / 16	38
1957–58	4	Kiskunhalasi MÁV	2 / 16	43
1957	4	Kiskunhalasi MÁV	0 / 10	
1956	3	Kiskunhalasi Törekvés	16 / 16	11
1955	3	Kiskunhalasi Törekvés	14 / 14	11
1954	3	Kiskunhalasi Lokomotív	6 / 14	26
1953	3	Kiskunhalasi Lokomotív	3 / 12	33
1952	3	Kiskunhalasi Lokomotív	6 / 14	32
1951	3	Kiskunhalasi Lokomotív	5 / 12	26
1950	2	Kiskunhalasi VSK	13 / 16	9
1949–50	2	Kiskunhalasi VSK	12 / 16	24
1948–49	3	Kiskunhalasi VSE	1 / 16	46
1947–48	3	Kiskunhalasi VSE	1 / 14	40
1946–47	3	Kiskunhalasi VSE	5 / 14	27
1945–46	3	Kiskunhalasi VSE	1 / 8	23
1945	3	Kiskunhalasi Vasutas SE	1 / 7	
1928–29	3	Kiskunhalasi Vasutas SE	0 / 8	-
