= Magyar Posztógyári SE =

Hungarian football club

- Full name: Magyar Posztógyári SE
- Founded: 1931
- Dissolved: 1982
- Ground: Posztó Edzőpálya
Home colours

Magyar Posztógyári SE is a defunct professional football club based in Csepel, Budapest, Hungary.

== History ==
The Hungarian Cloth Factory, one of the most significant plants in the Hungarian wool industry, was founded in 1920 by the Weiss family and the Pesti Magyar Kereskedelmi Bank. The factory began production using the former equipment of the Losonc Cloth Factory, including a spinning mill, a dyeing plant, and a finishing plant; it then expanded in the 1920s by putting into operation looms dismantled from the factories in Bratislava and Banská Bystrica. In 1933, the spinning mill was spun off as the Csepel Comb Spinning Mill, but in terms of production, it continued to meet the needs of the parent company; its independence was dissolved after World War II, in 1945.

As part of the Weiss Group, the company was placed under state administration in 1946; it was then nationalized in 1948 and split into two separate entities. The newly established Hungarian Cloth Factory and the Csepel Combing Mill were transferred at that time from the jurisdiction of the Heavy Industry Center to that of the Ministry of Light Industry, and in 1950 they were merged to form the Hungarian Cloth Factory National Corporation. In 1963, its defined scope of operations was “the production of wool, man-made fiber, and synthetic combed slivers; combed wool, man-made fiber, and synthetic yarns, as well as carded wool yarns; and combed and carded wool fabrics.” Although the factory endeavored to keep pace with changing market demands in the 1970s and 1980s, its privatization was unsuccessful, and it was liquidated in 1996.

The soccer team of the sports club, founded in 1930, began competing in the Company Championship; however, in 1931–32, it withdrew from the company league and continued playing in Division V of the Budapest Sub-Association. Although the factory club was known primarily for its boxers rather than its soccer players, by the end of the 1930s the soccer team had also advanced to the Amateur First Division, and between 1942 and 1944 they were members of NB III. They began the postwar period in BLASZ Division II, gradually working their way up to NB III in 1948 and, in the fall of 1950—the pinnacle of the team’s league performance—to NB II.

Magyar Posztó won the Bíró Dezső group of the 1949–50 Nemzeti Bajnokság III season and gained promotion to the second division. However, Magyar Posztó could spend only one season at the second level and were relegated back to the third division after finishing in the 14th position of the 1950 Nemzeti Bajnokság II season.

The club’s management, which had once seen better days, did not give up on its dreams of reaching the NB, but its desperate pursuit of results did not pay off.

Magyar Posztó never made it back to the NB league. In the 1976–77 season, the team withdrew from the BLSZ Second Division championship, and there are no records of its participation in senior league play after that. In the late 1970s, Csepel’s youngest age group, the “preparatory” team—led by András Szekeres, the former three-time champion Csepel goalkeeper (who served as the national team coach of Togo in 1975–76)—held its training sessions on the team’s field.

== Name changes ==
- Magyar Posztógyári Sport Egyesület: 1930 – 1945
- Csepeli MaDISz: 1945 – 1946
- Csepeli Posztó: 1946 – 1948
- 1948: merger with Csepeli Barátság
- Magyar Posztó SE: 1948 – 1951
- Vörös Lobogó Magyar Posztó SK: 1951 – 1957
- Magyar Posztó SE: 1957 – ?

== Honours ==
=== League ===
- Nemzeti Bajnokság III:
  - Winners (1): 1949–50

== Seasons ==
The highest league that Magyar Posztógyári SE have ever played was the third division.

Season	Tier	Club's name	Position	Pts
1931–32	6	Magyar Posztógyári SE	8 / 9	11
1932–33	6	Magyar Posztó SE	6 / 11	17
1933–34	5	Magyar Posztó SE	6 / 13	27
1934–35	5	Magyar Posztó SE	4 / 12	33
1935–36	4	Magyar Posztó SE	7 / 13	24
1936–37	4	Magyar Posztó SE	3 / 15	40
1937–38	3	Magyar Posztó SE	4 / 14	33
1938–39	3	Magyar Posztó SE	9 / 14	21
1939–40	3	Magyar Posztó	6 / 14	32
1940–41	4	Magyar Posztó SE	13 / 13	13
1941–42	4	Magyar Posztó SE	6 / 14	29
1942–43	3	Magyar Posztó SE	11 / 14	22
1943–44	3	Magyar Posztó SE	9 / 16	28
1944–45	3	Magyar Posztógyári SE	0 / 12	
1945–46	3	Csepeli MaDISz	1 / 14	45
1946–47	3	Csepeli Posztó	4 / 15	40
1947–48	3	Csepeli Posztó	4 / 16	41
1948–49	3	Magyar Posztó SE	3 / 18	41
1949–50	3	Magyar Posztó SE	1 / 16	46
1950	2	Magyar Posztó SE	14 / 16	12
1951	3	Vörös Lobogó Magyar Posztó	3 / 12	29
1952	3	Vörös Lobogó Magyar Posztó	12 / 14	19
1953	3	Vörös Lobogó Magyar Posztó	16 / 16	11
1954	4	Vörös Lobogó Magyar Posztó	1 / 15	42
1955	3	Magyar Posztó	13 / 16	20
1956	4	Magyar Posztó SE	2 / 16	45
1957–58	4	Magyar Posztó SE	6 / 20	42
1958–59	4	Magyar Posztó	3 / 16	37
1959–60	4	Magyar Posztó SE	3 / 16	41
1960–61	4	Magyar Posztógyári SE	2 / 16	42
1961–62	4	Magyar Posztó SE	15 / 16	21
1962–63	4	Magyar Posztó SE	14 / 16	18
1963	5	Magyar Posztó SE	2 / 16	20
1964	5	Magyar Posztó SE	13 / 16	27
1965	6	Magyar Posztó	1 / 14	40
1966	5	Magyar Posztó SE	14 / 14	13
1967	6	Magyar Posztó SE	6 / 14	28
1968	6	Magyar Posztógyári SE	4 / 16	39
1969	6	Magyar Posztó SE	7 / 16	30
1970	6	Magyar Posztó SE	4 / 16	19
1970–71	6	Magyar Posztó SE	10 / 16	31
1971–72	6	Magyar Posztó SE	4 / 16	34
1972–73	6	Magyar Posztó SE	2 / 16	44
1973–74	5	Magyar Posztó SE	8 / 16	30
1974–75	5	Magyar Posztó SE	5 / 16	31
1976–77	5	Magyar Posztó SE	0 / 16	
1977–78	6	Magyar Posztó	12 / 16	23
1978–79	5	Magyar Posztó	15 / 16	11
1979–80	6	Magyar Posztó	4 / 13	26
1980–81	6	Magyar Posztó	0 / 12	
1981–82	7	Magyar Posztógyári SE	2 / 16	39
