= Borsodi Bányász SE =

Hungarian football club

- Full name: Borsodi Bányász Sport Egyesület
- Founded: 1920
- Dissolved: 1989
Home colours

Borsodi Bányász Sport Egyesület is a defunct professional football club based in Sajószentpéter, Borsod–Abaúj–Zemplén County, Hungary.

== History ==
Borsodi Bányász SE won the Miskolc-Salgótarján group the 1948–49 Nemzeti Bajnokság III season and gained promotion to the second division, as Sajószentpéteri BTK. Borsodi Bányász SE spent six consecutive years in the second division; however, they finished in 11th position in the 1954 Nemzeti Bajnokság II season and were relegated to the third division.

== Name changes ==
- Sajószentpéteri Bányatelepi Torna Kör: 1920 – 1949
- Sajószentpéteri Tárna: 1949 – 1951
- Sajószentpéteri Bányász Sport Kör: 1951 – 1954
- Bükkaljai Bányász Sport Kör: 1954 – 1958
- Borsodi Bányász Sport Kör: 1958 – 1978
- 1978: merger with Edelényi Bányász
- Borsodi Bányász Sport Egyesület: 1978 – 1989
- 1979: split with Edelényi Bányász

== Honours ==
=== League ===
- Nemzeti Bajnokság III:
  - Winners (1): 1948–49

== Seasons ==
The table below shows the seasons of Borsodi Bányász SE.

Season	Tier	Club's name	Position	Pts
1926–27	3	Sajószentpéteri BTK	3 / 5	8
1927–28	3	Sajószentpéteri BTK	0 / 8	-
1928–29	3	Sajószentpéteri Bányatelepi TK	4 / 6	8
1937–38	3	Sajószentpéteri BTK	7 / 11	19
1938–39	4	Sajószentpéteri BTK	4 / 9	14
1939–40	4	Sajószentpéteri BTK	5 / 13	31
1940–41	4	Sajószentpéteri BTK	9 / 10	12
1941–42	4	Sajószentpéteri BTK	5 / 12	26
1942–43	4	Sajószentpéteri BTK	6 / 9	9
1943–44	4	Sajószentpéteri BTK	12 / 15	24
1945	3	Sajószentpéteri BTK	1 / 6	
1945	3	Sajószentpéteri BTK	9 / 10	
1945–46	2	Sajószentpéteri BTK	7 / 12	19
1946–47	3	Sajószentpéteri BTK	4 / 13	30
1947–48	3	Sajószentpéteri BTK	4 / 14	36
1948–49	3	Sajószentpéteri BTK	1 / 16	47
1949–50	2	Sajószentpéteri Tárna	6 / 16	36
1950	2	Sajószentpéteri Tárna	1 / 16	25
1951	2	Sajószentpéteri Bányász	10 / 14	21
1952	2	Sajószentpéteri Bányász	5 / 18	41
1953	2	Sajószentpéteri Bányász	11 / 16	28
1954	2	Sajószentpéteri Bányász	11 / 16	26
1955	3	Bükkaljai Bányász	1 / 12	35
1956	3	Bükkaljai Bányász	1 / 12	34
1957	2	Bükkaljai Bányász	3 / 6	13
1957–58	2	Bükkaljai Bányász	5 / 19	41
1958–59	2	Borsodi Bányász	3 / 16	34
1959–60	2	Borsodi Bányász SK	7 / 16	32
1960–61	2	Borsodi Bányász	11 / 16	26
1961–62	2	Borsodi Bányász	11 / 16	29
1962–63	2	Borsodi Bányász SK	6 / 16	31
1963	2	Borsodi Bányász	7 / 16	15
1964	2	Borsodi Bányász	15 / 16	27
1965	3	Borsodi Bányász	5 / 18	40
1966	3	Borsodi Bányász	7 / 18	34
1967	3	Borsodi Bányász	7 / 16	30
1968	3	Borsodi Bányász	3 / 16	38
1969	3	Borsodi Bányász	12 / 16	27
1970	3	Borsodi Bányász	14 / 16	9
1970–71	3	Borsodi Bányász	16 / 16	13
1971–72	4	Borsodi Bányász	5 / 16	37
1972–73	4	Borsodi Bányász	2 / 16	38
1973–74	4	Borsodi Bányász	2 / 16	39
1974–75	3	Borsodi Bányász	14 / 20	36
1975–76	3	Borsodi Bányász	13 / 20	38
1976–77	3	Borsodi Bányász	13 / 20	32
1977–78	3	Borsodi Bányász	11 / 20	40
1978–79	2	Borsodi Bányász	19 / 20	22
1979–80	3	Borsodi Bányász	2 / 18	51
1980–81	3	Borsodi Bányász	2 / 18	48
1981–82	3	Borsodi Bányász	7 / 16	34
1982–83	3	Borsodi Bányász	7 / 16	31
1983–84	3	Borsodi Bányász	14 / 16	25
1984–85	4	Borsodi Bányász	1 / 16	46
1985–86	3	Borsodi Bányász	11 / 17	30
1986–87	3	Borsodi Bányász	7 / 16	32
1987–88	3	Borsodi Bányász	6 / 16	34
1988–89	3	Borsodi Bányász	5 / 16	49
