= 1950 Nemzeti Bajnokság I =

Season of the Hungarian National Championship

Nemzeti Bajnokság I
- Season: 1950
- Champions: Budapest Honvéd FC

Statistics of Nemzeti Bajnokság I in the 1950 season.

== Overview ==
It was contested by 16 teams, and Budapest Honvéd FC won the championship.

== League standings ==
| Pos | Team | Pld | W | D | L | GF | GA | GR | Pts |
|---|---|---|---|---|---|---|---|---|---|
| 1 | Budapest Honvéd FC | 15 | 13 | 1 | 1 | 67 | 16 | 4.188 | 27 |
| 2 | Textiles | 15 | 11 | 2 | 2 | 54 | 25 | 2.160 | 24 |
| 3 | Bp. Dózsa | 15 | 9 | 3 | 3 | 37 | 23 | 1.609 | 21 |
| 4 | Csepel SC | 15 | 8 | 2 | 5 | 33 | 21 | 1.571 | 18 |
| 5 | Dorog | 15 | 8 | 2 | 5 | 36 | 32 | 1.125 | 18 |
| 6 | Vasas SC | 15 | 8 | 1 | 6 | 30 | 23 | 1.304 | 17 |
| 7 | Salgótarjáni BTC | 15 | 6 | 4 | 5 | 27 | 26 | 1.038 | 16 |
| 8 | Diósgyőri VTK | 15 | 5 | 6 | 4 | 21 | 23 | 0.913 | 16 |
| 9 | Győri ETO FC | 15 | 6 | 1 | 8 | 28 | 28 | 1.000 | 13 |
| 10 | ÉDOSZ | 15 | 5 | 2 | 8 | 25 | 30 | 0.833 | 12 |
| 11 | Szombathelyi Haladás | 15 | 3 | 6 | 6 | 16 | 26 | 0.615 | 12 |
| 12 | Szegedi MTE | 15 | 4 | 4 | 7 | 22 | 44 | 0.500 | 12 |
| 13 | Budapesti Postás SE | 15 | 4 | 3 | 8 | 18 | 28 | 0.643 | 11 |
| 14 | Budapesti Előre | 15 | 4 | 2 | 9 | 26 | 41 | 0.634 | 10 |
| 15 | Bőripari DSE | 15 | 2 | 3 | 10 | 22 | 51 | 0.431 | 7 |
| 16 | FC Tatabánya | 15 | 1 | 4 | 10 | 17 | 42 | 0.405 | 6 |

Source: rsssf.com

== Results ==
| Home \ Away | BŐR | CSE | DIÓ | DOR | DÓZ | ÉDO | ELŐ | GYŐ | HON | LOK | POS | SAL | SZE | TAT | TEX | VAS |
|---|---|---|---|---|---|---|---|---|---|---|---|---|---|---|---|---|
| Bőripari | | 0–4 | 0–1 | | 1–5 | 1–4 | 1–1 | 2–1 | 0–4 | 2–4 | 0–0 | 1–6 | 3–3 | 3–1 | 4–6 | 2–7 |
| Csepel | | | | | | 4–1 | 1–3 | | | | | 4–1 | | | | |
| Diósgyőr | | 0–3 | | | 1–0 | 0–3 | 4–2 | | | 0–0 | 1–1 | 4–4 | 3–1 | 1–2 | 2–4 | |
| Dorog | 4–2 | 3–1 | 1–1 | | 3–3 | 3–0 | 5–2 | 1–2 | 1–10 | 3–0 | 2–1 | 0–3 | 5–0 | 2–1 | 2–4 | 1–2 |
| Budapesti Dózsa | | 1–4 | | | | 1–0 | 4–1 | | | 5–3 | 2–1 | 2–0 | 2–2 | 3–1 | 3–2 | |
| ÉDOSZ | | | | | | | 2–3 | | | | | | | | | |
| Budapesti Előre | | | | | | | | | | | | | | | | |
| Győri Vasas | | 1–4 | 0–1 | | 2–2 | 1–2 | 4–2 | | 2–1 | 1–0 | 4–0 | 0–3 | 1–3 | 6–1 | 1–3 | |
| Budapest Honvéd | | 5–0 | 2–2 | | 2–0 | 4–2 | 4–2 | | | 5–0 | 2–1 | 6–0 | 7–2 | 4–1 | 6–3 | |
| Lokomotiv Szombathely | | 0–0 | | | | 2–1 | 2–4 | | | | 2–3 | 0–0 | 1–1 | 1–1 | 0–0 | |
| Postás | | 1–0 | | | | 1–1 | 2–0 | | | | | 1–3 | 2–3 | 2–1 | 1–2 | |
| Salgótarján | | | | | | 1–3 | 1–0 | | | | | | | | | |
| Szegedi MTE | | 0–4 | | | | 0–2 | 2–2 | | | | | 2–0 | | 2–1 | 1–6 | |
| Tatabánya | | 1–1 | | | | 1–1 | 2–3 | | | | | 2–2 | | | 1–10 | |
| Textiles | | 4–2 | | | | 3–1 | 5–0 | | | | | 1–1 | | | | |
| Vasas | | 0–1 | 0–0 | | 0–4 | 5–2 | 2–1 | 3–2 | 0–5 | 0–1 | 5–1 | 0–2 | 5–0 | 1–0 | 0–1 | |

Source: rsssf.com
Legend: Blue = home team win; Yellow = draw; Red = away team win.

== Statistical leaders ==
=== Top goalscorers ===
| Rank | Scorer | Club | Goals |
|---|---|---|---|
| 1 | (Hungary) Ferenc Puskás | Budapest Honvéd | 25 |
| 2 | (Hungary) Sándor Kocsis | Budapest Honvéd | 24 |
| 3 | (Hungary) Péter Palotás | Budapesti Textiles | 17 |
| 4 | (Hungary) Ferenc Deák | Budapesti Dózsa | 12 |
| 4 | (Hungary) Nándor Hidegkuti | Budapesti Textiles | 12 |
| 4 | (Hungary) József Molnár | Dorogi Tárna | 12 |
| 7 | (Hungary) Mihály Keszthelyi | Csepeli Munkás | 10 |
| 8 | (Hungary) László Budai | Budapest Honvéd | 8 |
| 8 | (Hungary) Egresi Béla | Budapesti Dózsa | 8 |
| 8 | (Hungary) László Ladányi | Szegedi MTE | 8 |

== See also ==
- 1950 Nemzeti Bajnokság II
