= Csepeli Papír SC =

Hungarian football club

- Full name: Csepeli Papír Sport Club
- Founded: 1945
- Dissolved: 1986
Home colours

Csepeli Papír Sport Club is a defunct professional football club based in Csepel, Budapest, Hungary.

== Background ==
The predecessor of the Csepel Paper Mill, the Neményi Brothers General Partnership, was founded in 1908 at the Közműhelytelep in Pestszenterzsébet. In 1923, József Neményi moved the small factory, which specialized in the production of corrugated and patterned paper, to Csepel, and in 1924, the Neményi Brothers Paper Mill Corporation began operations. At that time, the factory employed about 25 workers and produced packaging, writing, and corrugated paper.

Between 1924 and 1938, a total of six paper machines were commissioned. Among these, Paper Machine No. 4—manufactured by Voith and installed in 1933—stood out as it represented world-class technology; however, it was removed after 1945 as reparations. In 1933, the factory also established a wood-grinding plant to reduce its dependence on imports. That same year—as a result of intense competition emerging in the paper industry—the company was forced to form a cartel with Austrian firms and the First Hungarian Cardboard Factory Joint-Stock Company.

In 1942, after the Hungarian General Credit Bank became a shareholder, a syndicate was formed under the company's management. The factory sustained significant damage during the bombings of 1944, particularly the corrugated paper plant and the pulp mill, which was still under construction at the time and was not completed until 1948. In 1945, the Csepel Paper Mill was the first in Hungary to produce rotary paper.

Following nationalization in 1948, the factory expanded: a technical school for the paper industry, its own thermal power plant, and a machine manufacturing plant were established, and the production of packaging paper and soda ash bags developed significantly. In 1959, the first domestically manufactured paper machine began operation here. In 1963, the factory was incorporated into the Paper Industry Company.

Today, the factory is operated by Dunapack Kft.

== History ==
Csepeli Papír SC won the Lénárt group of the 1949–50 Nemzeti Bajnokság III season, as Csepeli Papír.

== Name changes ==
- Neményi Papírgyár SE: 1945 – 1948
- Csepeli Papír SC: 1948 – 1950
- Csepeli Papírgyári Lombik: 1950 – 1951
- Csepeli Szikra SK: 1951 – 1957
- Csepeli Papírgyár SE: 1957 – 1986

== Honours ==
=== League ===
- Nemzeti Bajnokság III:
  - Winners (1): 1949–50

== Seasons ==
The table below shows Csepeli Papír SC's seasons.

Season	Tier	Club's name	Position	Pts
1945–46	4	Neményi Papirgyár SE	1 / 12	37
1946–47	4	Neményi-papírgyár	2 / 13	36
1947–48	3	Neményi-papírgyár	4 / 16	43
1948–49	3	Csepeli Papír	4 / 18	43
1949–50	3	Csepeli Papír	1 / 16	51
1950	2	Csepeli Papírgyári Lombik	10 / 16	14
1951	2	Csepeli Szikra	10 / 14	20
1952	2	Csepeli Szikra	11 / 18	30
1953	2	Csepeli Szikra	15 / 16	23
1954	3	Csepeli Szikra	3 / 16	40
1955	3	Csepeli Szikra	5 / 16	40
1956	3	Csepeli Szikra	11 / 14	20
1957	3	Csepeli Papír	6 / 8	11
1957–58	4	Csepeli Papírgyár SE	3 / 20	44
1958–59	4	Csepeli Papír	8 / 16	28
1959–60	4	Csepeli Papír	13 / 16	26
1960–61	4	Csepeli Papírgyár	15 / 16	19
1961–62	5	Csepeli Papírgyár	1 / 16	53
1962–63	4	Csepeli Papír	6 / 16	32
1963	5	Csepeli Papírgyári SE	3 / 16	22
1964	5	Csepeli Papírgyár	4 / 16	43
1965	5	Csepeli Papírgyár	4 / 14	33
1966	5	Csepeli Papír	7 / 14	27
1967	5	Csepeli Papírgyár SE	4 / 16	36
1968	5	Csepeli Papír	9 / 18	35
1969	5	Csepeli Papír	7 / 18	37
1970	5	Csepeli Papírgyár	4 / 16	18
1970–71	5	Csepeli Papírgyár SC	2 / 16	41
1971–72	4	Csepeli Papírgyár	5 / 16	33
1972–73	4	Csepeli Papírgyár	14 / 16	24
1973–74	4	Csepeli Papírgyár	16 / 16	8
1974–75	5	Csepeli Papírgyár SC	9 / 16	30
1976–77	4	Csepeli Papírgyári SE	14 / 18	31
1977–78	5	Csepeli Papír	8 / 16	26
1978–79	4	Csepeli Papírgyár	8 / 16	26
1979–80	4	Csepeli Papírgyár	15 / 16	17
1980–81	5	Csepeli Papír	12 / 16	14
1981–82	6	Csepeli Papír	12 / 16	25
1983–84	5	Csepeli Papírgyár	14 / 16	20
1984–85	5	Csepeli Papírgyár	10 / 16	24
1985–86	5	Csepeli Papírgyár	15 / 16	15
