= Gázművek SE =

Hungarian football club

- Full name: Gázművek Sport Egyesület
- Founded: 1932
- Ground: Sujtás utcai pálya (1956–)
Home colours	Away colours

Gázművek Sport Egyesület is an association football club from the town of Óbuda, Hungary.

== History ==
Gázművek SE won the 1953 Nemzeti Bajnokság II season as Szikra Gázűvek.

== Grounds ==
- Fehér úti Sporttelep: (1935–1936)
- Sujtás utcai sportpálya: (1936–1942)
- Millenáris: (1942)
- Népfürdő utcai Stadion: (1943–1945)
- Sujtás utcai sportpálya: (1945–1946)
- Hévízi úti Stadion: (1946–1956)
- Sujtás utcai sportpálya: (1956–)

== Name changes ==
- Gázművek Sport Egyesület: 1921–1932(?)
- Gázgyári MTE: 1932(?)–1944
- 1944-ben merger with Elektromos SE
- 1945: reestablished
- Gázgyári MTE: 1944–1949
- 1946 merger with Óbudai Barátság SE
- Fővárosi Gázművek Lombik SE: 1949–1951
- Szikra Gázművek SK: 1951–1957
- Gázművek MTE: 1957–2005
- 2005 merger with Multi-Rocco FC
- Multi-Rocco Gázművek: 2005–2006
- Gázművek Munkás Testedző Egyesület: 2006–2012
- Atlétikai Sportegyesület Rómaifürdő-Gázművek Munkás Testedző Egyesület: 2012–2013
- Atlétikai Sportegyesület Rómaifürdő Gázgyár: 2013–February 2024
- 2024 merger with UDSE
- UDSE-Gázgyár: February 2024–June 2024
- BVB Akadémia Gázgyár: June 2024–

== Honours ==
=== League ===
- Nemzeti Bajnokság II:
  - Winners (1): 1953
  - Runners-up (1): 1952
  - Third place (2): 1951, 1954

== Seasons ==
The table below shows the seasons of Gázművek SE.

Season	Tier	Club's name	Position	Pts
1935–36	6	Gázgyár	2 / 11	36
1936–37	5	Gázgyár	3 / 12	35
1937–38	5	Gázgyár	1 / 14	41
1938–39	5	Gázgyár	6 / 14	31
1939–40	4	Gázgyár	3 / 14	37
1940–41	4	Gázgyár	1 / 13	35
1941–42	3	Gázgyár	4 / 12	27
1942–43	2	Gázgyár	4 / 14	32
1943–44	2	Gázgyár	7 / 14	26
1945–46	3	Gázgyár MTE	8 / 12	18
1946–47	3	Gázgyár	1 / 15	46
1947–48	2	Gázgyár	4 / 14	35
1948–49	2	Gázgyár	3 / 16	42
1949–50	2	Fővárosi Gázművek Lombik SE	5 / 16	33
1950	2	Fővárosi Gázművek Lombik SE	8 / 16	15
1951	2	Szikra Gázművek	5 / 14	28
1952	2	Szikra Gázművek	2 / 18	49
1953	2	Szikra Gázművek	1 / 16	46
1954	2	Szikra Gázművek	15 / 16	13
1955	3	Szikra Gázművek	1 / 16	50
1956	2	Gázgyár	15 / 16	13
1957–58	2	Gázművek MTE	11 / 19	33
1958–59	3	Gázművek MTE	4 / 16	34
1959–60	3	Gázművek MTE	4 / 17	36
1960–61	3	Gázművek MTE	5 / 16	32
1961–62	3	Gázművek MTE	14 / 16	24
1962–63	4	Gázművek	2 / 16	44
1963	5	Gázművek	1 / 16	25
1964	5	Gázművek	1 / 16	49
1965	4	Gázművek MTE	7 / 16	32
1966	4	Gázművek MTE	10 / 16	29
1967	4	Gázművek MTE	1 / 16	43
1968	3	Gázművek MTE	14 / 16	25
1969	4	Gázművek MTE	10 / 16	30
1970	4	Gázművek MTE	7 / 16	16
1970–71	4	Gázművek MTE	14 / 16	28
1971–72	4	Gázművek MTE	8 / 16	31
1972–73	4	Gázművek MTE	13 / 16	26
1973–74	4	Gázművek MTE	13 / 16	20
1974–75	5	Gázművek	10 / 16	28
1975–76	5	Gázművek MTE	12 / 16	25
1976–77	5	Gázművek MTE	3 / 16	38
1977–78	5	Gázművek MTE	4 / 16	36
1978–79	4	Gázművek MTE	4 / 16	33
1979–80	4	Gázművek MTE	6 / 16	31
1980–81	4	Gázművek MTE	2 / 16	45
1981–82	4	Gázművek MTE	10 / 16	27
1982–83	4	Gázművek MTE	16 / 16	15
1983–84	5	Gázművek MTE	15 / 16	23
1984–85	5	Gázművek MTE	1 / 16	48
1985–86	4	Gázművek MTE	9 / 16	27
1986–87	4	Gázművek MTE	14 / 16	22
1987–88	4	Gázművek MTE	14 / 16	17
1988–89	4	Gázművek MTE	6 / 16	32
1989–90	4	Gázművek MTE	10 / 16	36
1990–91	4	Gázművek MTE	15 / 16	24
1991–92	5	Gázművek MTE	1 / 16	54
1992–93	4	Gázművek MTE	5 / 16	33
1993–94	4	Gázművek MTE	3 / 16	40
1994–95	4	Gázművek MTE	2 / 16	71
1995–96	4	Gázművek MTE	2 / 16	65
1996–97	4	Gázművek MTE	2 / 16	68
1997–98	4	Gázművek MTE	5 / 16	59
1998–99	4	Gázművek MTE	13 / 16	32
1999–00	4	Gázművek MTE	6 / 16	47
2000	3	Gázművek MTE	6 / 8	13
2000–01	4	Gázművek MTE	6 / 10	30
2001–02	4	Gázművek MTE	9 / 16	37
2002–03	4	Gázművek MTE	5 / 16	44
2003–04	4	Gázművek MTE	13 / 16	34
2004–05	6	Gázművek MTE	5 / 16	58
2005–06	4	Gázművek MTE	5 / 16	43
2006–07	4	Gázművek MTE	7 / 18	51
2007–08	4	Gázművek MTE	3 / 18	67
2008–09	4	Gázművek MTE	2 / 16	62
2009–10	4	Gázművek MTE	4 / 16	56
2010–11	4	Gázművek MTE	1 / 16	72
2011–12	3	Gázművek MTE	16 / 16	5
2012–13	4	ASR-Gázművek MTE	13 / 16	35
2013–14	5	ASR Gázgyár	4 / 16	60
2014–15	5	ASR Gázgyár	2 / 16	69
2015–16	4	ASR Gázgyár	1 / 16	73
2016–17	4	ASR Gázgyár	3 / 16	54
2017–18	4	ASR-Gázgyár	4 / 16	54
2018–19	4	ASR Gázgyár	7 / 16	47
2019–20	4	ASR Gázgyár	13 / 16	14
2020–21	4	ASR Gázgyár	12 / 16	34
2021–22	4	ASR Gázgyár	11 / 16	30
2022–23	4	ASR Gázgyár	7 / 16	41
2023–24	4	UDSE-Gázgyár	13 / 16	26
2024–25	4	UDSE Gázgyár	15 / 16	11
2025–26	6	UDSE-Gázgyár	13 / 14	13
