= Magyar Pamut SC =

Hungarian football club

- Full name: Magyar Pamut SC
- Founded: 1927
- Dissolved: 1992
Home colours

Magyar Pamut Sport Club was aprofessional football club based in Budapest, Hungary.

== History ==
The club, founded in 1927, used a color scheme that was highly unusual in soccer—one reminiscent of Palermo, Italy. According to the legend, during the club’s early years of hardship, Róbert Szurday, the company’s director, managed to procure a set of uniforms from somewhere for the cotton industry association—which had originally been committed to Vasas’s red-and-blue colors—but when it turned out that the appearance of the donated uniforms didn’t match their vision, practicality prevailed: they hastily changed the club’s colors rather than go to the trouble of ordering new jerseys.

In contrast to 1947, when Magyar Pamut played a friendly match against the Hungarian national team—featuring Ferenc Rudas, Mihály Nagymarosi, Ferenc Szusza, and Ferenc Puskás (losing 5–0 at the Megyeri út stadium)— the club competed in NB II until 1951—and even won a bronze medal in the second division in 1950—but in later years it had to adapt to the rough-and-tumble realities of the lower leagues.

Over the past forty years, the team’s best finish in Budapest’s First Division was a sixth-place finish in 1969, in a league whose roster alone is like a trip back in time: Csillaghegyi MTE, XV. District Növényolaj, Sashalmi Electronic Measuring Instruments Factory, Rákoskeresztúr MTE, Tools and Machine Parts, Honvéd Ságvári SE, Karhatalmi Dózsa, Budapest Red Meteor, Hungarian Crane and Shipyard, Chinoin, Óbuda Goldberger, Újpest Thread Factory, Duna Shoe Factory, Óbuda Cotton Industry, Zugló Porcelain, Budapest Waterworks, Aluminum. Those were different times; the capital’s soccer scene was buzzing, sports complexes in Újpest were practically side by side, and the legend of Budapest’s championships grew every weekend on Blaha Lujza Street with another colorful episode. Take, for example, the story of János Balogh, the soccer-hating cashier, immortalized by Zoltán Kőrösi—the writer who passed away in 2016—in his short story *Magyar Pamut* (*Hungarian Cotton*), which offers a glimpse into the life of a family living next to the soccer field.

The Magyar Pamut soccer team disbanded at the end of the 1991–1992 season, following the closure of the factory. However, at the initiative of former center-half Károly Varga, members of the squad have been gathering every year.

== Name changes ==
- ? – 1951: Magyar Pamutipari Sport Club
- 1951 – 1957: Vörös Lobogó Magyar Pamut SK
- 1957 – 1992: Magyar Pamut SC

== Honours ==
=== League ===
- Nemzeti Bajnokság III:
  - Winners (1): 1948–49

== Seasons ==
The table shows the seasons of Magyar Pamut SC.

Season	Tier	Club's name	Position	Pts
1930–31	5	Magyar Pamutipari SC	3 / 14	36
1931–32	5	Magyar Pamutipari SC	1 / 12	35
1932–33	4	Magyar Pamutipari SC	2 / 16	45
1933–34	3	Magyar Pamutipari SC	1 / 14	34
1934–35	2	Magyar Pamutipari SC	5 / 12	23
1935–36	2	Magyar Pamut SC	5 / 13	27
1936–37	2	Magyar Pamut SC	3 / 13	32
1937–38	2	Magyar Pamutipar SC	10 / 14	22
1938–39	3	Magyar Pamutipar	6 / 15	29
1939–40	3	Magyar Pamut SC	4 / 13	30
1940–41	3	Magyar Pamut SC	7 / 12	23
1941–42	3	Magyar Pamut SC	3 / 16	40
1942–43	2	Magyar Pamut SC	9 / 12	21
1943–44	2	Magyar Pamut SC	15 / 16	17
1944–45	2	Magyar Pamutipari SC	9 / 16	8
1944–45	2	Magyar Pamutipari SC	0 / 12	
1945	2	Magyar Pamutipari SC	8 / 12	20
1945–46	2	Magyar Pamut SC	8 / 14	26
1946–47	3	Magyar Pamut SC	2 / 15	41
1947–48	3	Magyar Pamutipari SC	2 / 16	48
1948–49	3	Magyar Pamut SC	1 / 18	48
1949–50	2	Magyar Pamut SC	10 / 16	26
1950	2	Magyar Pamut SC	3 / 16	20
1951	2	Vörös Lobogó Magyar Pamut	14 / 14	16
1952	3	Vörös Lobogó Magyar Pamut	10 / 14	21
1953	3	Vörös Lobogó Magyar Pamut	11 / 16	27
1954	3	Vörös Lobogó Magyar Pamut	11 / 16	24
1955	3	Vörös Lobogó Magyar Pamut	11 / 16	23
1956	3	Vörös Lobogó Magyar Pamut	4 / 14	31
1957	3	Magyar Pamut SC	3 / 8	14
1957–58	3	Magyar Pamut SC	5 / 16	37
1958–59	3	Magyar Pamut SC	15 / 16	18
1959–60	4	Magyar Pamut SC	3 / 16	42
1960–61	4	Magyar Pamutipari SC	5 / 16	36
1961–62	4	Magyar Pamutipari SC	7 / 16	33
1962–63	4	Magyar Pamut SC	9 / 16	30
1963	5	Magyar Pamut	2 / 16	21
1964	5	Magyar Pamut SC	9 / 16	28
1965	5	Magyar Pamut SC	4 / 14	32
1966	5	Magyar Pamut SC	5 / 14	30
1967	5	Magyar Pamutipar SC	11 / 16	27
1968	5	Magyar Pamut SC	8 / 18	39
1969	5	Magyar Pamutipari SC	6 / 18	39
1970	5	Magyar Pamutipar SC	9 / 16	13
1970–71	5	Magyar Pamut SC	14 / 16	23
1971–72	5	Magyar Pamutipari SC	15 / 16	17
1972–73	6	Magyar Pamut	10 / 16	25
1973–74	6	Magyar Pamut	6 / 15	32
1974–75	6	Magyar Pamut SC	0 / 16	
1977–78	6	Magyar Pamut	12 / 16	24
1978–79	5	Magyar Pamut	10 / 16	25
1979–80	5	Magyar Pamut	5 / 16	34
1980–81	5	Magyar Pamut SC	4 / 15	39
1981–82	6	Magyar Pamut	1 / 16	48
1982–83	5	Magyar Pamut SC	9 / 16	28
1983–84	5	Magyar Pamut SC	13 / 16	27
1984–85	5	Magyar Pamut SC	15 / 16	19
1988–89	5	Magyar Pamut	16 / 16	17
1990–91	5	Magyar Pamut SC	8 / 16	28
1991–92	5	Magyar Pamut SC	10 / 16	26
