= Csillaghegyi MTE =

Hungarian football club

- Full name: Csillaghegyi Munkás Torna Egylet
- Founded: 1904
- Website: http://www.csillaghegyimte.hu/index.html
| Home colours | Away colours |

Csillaghegyi Munkás Torna Egylet is a football club from the town of Budapest, Hungary.

== History ==
Csillaghegy finished in the second position in the 1950 Nemzeti Bajnokság II season.

In the 1970, Péter Esterházy, the Hungarian writer, also played for the club.

== Grounds ==
- Márton út
- Hévízi úti stadion

== Name changes ==
- Csillaghegyi Football Club: 1904 - 1920
- MOVE Csillaghegyi Football Club: 1920 - 1923
- Csillaghegyi Football Club: 1923 - 1924
- MOVE Csillaghegyi Football Club: 1924 - 1931
- on 30 August 1931 merger with Kissingtelepi TC
- MOVE Csillaghegy-Kissingtelepi AC: 1931 - 1940
- MOVE Csillaghegyi TSE: 1940 - 1945
- Csillaghegyi Munkás Torna Egylet: 1945 - 1949
- Csillaghegyi Szakmaközi MTE. 1949 - 1950
- Csillaghegyi Textil: 1950 - 1951
- in 1950 fusion with Csillaghegyi SzSE
- Csillaghegyi Vörös Lobogó SK: 1951 - 1957
- Csillaghegyi Munkás Torna Egylet: 1957 - 2011
- 2011-ben megvették a megszűnt, Rákosmenti Rojik FC játékjogát
- Csillaghegyi MTE - FC Rojik Kft.: 2011 - 2013
- Csillaghegyi Munkás Torna Egylet: 2013 -

== Honours ==
=== League ===
- Nemzeti Bajnokság II:
  - Runners-up (1): 1950
  - Third place (2): 1951, 1952

== Management ==
- Imre Boldizsár (president)

== Seasons ==
The table below shows the seasons of Csillaghegyi MTE.

| Season | Tier | Club's name | Position | Pts |
|---|---|---|---|---|
| 1923–24 | 3 | Csillaghegyi FC | 2 / 7 | 17 |
| 1924–25 | 2 | MOVE Csillaghegyi FC | 10 / 10 | 3 |
| 1924–25 | 5 | MOVE Csillaghegyi FC | 1 / 4 | 9 |
| 1925–26 | 3 | Csillaghegyi MOVE FC | 3 / 10 | 18 |
| 1926–27 | 2 | Csillaghegyi MOVE FC | 3 / 7 | 12 |
| 1927–28 | 5 | Csillaghegyi MOVE FC | 0 / 9 | |
| 1927–28 | 2 | Csillaghegyi MOVE FC | 8 / 11 | 16 |
| 1928–29 | 2 | MOVE Csillaghegyi FC | 10 / 12 | 13 |
| 1928–29 | 2 | Csillaghegyi MOVE FC | 9 / 12 | 19 |
| 1929–30 | 2 | Csillaghegyi MOVE FC | 8 / 10 | 14 |
| 1931–32 | 2 | Csillaghegyi-Kissingtelepi AC | 8 / 11 | 15 |
| 1932–33 | 3 | Csillaghegy-Kissingtelepi AC | 1 / 8 | 21 |
| 1933–34 | 2 | Csillaghegy-Kissingtelepi AC | 8 / 12 | 18 |
| 1934–35 | 2 | Csillaghegy-Kissingtelepi AC | 12 / 12 | 3 |
| 1937–38 | 6 | Csillaghegyi TSE | 4 / 14 | 36 |
| 1938–39 | 3 | B. Csillaghegyi TSE | 10 / 14 | 21 |
| 1938–39 | 6 | Csillaghegy | 2 / 13 | 38 |
| 1939–40 | 3 | MOVE Csillaghegyi KAC | 1 / 14 | 42 |
| 1940–41 | 3 | MOVE Csillaghegyi TSE | 10 / 12 | 13 |
| 1941–42 | 3 | Csillaghegyi MOVE | 12 / 16 | 25 |
| 1942–43 | 3 | Csillaghegyi MOVE | 12 / 14 | 18 |
| 1943–44 | 3 | MOVE Csillaghegyi TSE | 10 / 16 | 23 |
| 1943–44 | 4 | MOVE Csillaghegy | 10 / 10 | 10 |
| 1944–45 | 2 | MOVE Csillaghegyi TSE | 12 / 16 | 5 |
| 1944–45 | 3 | MOVE Csillaghegyi TSE | 0 / 12 | |
| 1945 | 2 | Csillaghegyi MTE | 7 / 12 | 24 |
| 1945–46 | 2 | Csillaghegyi MTE | 0 / 12 | |
| 1946–47 | 3 | Csillaghegyi MTE | 3 / 16 | 27 |
| 1947–48 | 3 | Csillaghegyi MTE | 5 / 16 | 37 |
| 1948–49 | 3 | Csillaghegyi MTE | 9 / 18 | 28 |
| 1949–50 | 3 | Csillaghegyi Textil | 12 / 16 | 24 |
| 1950 | 2 | Csillaghegyi Textil | 2 / 16 | 21 |
| 1951 | 2 | Csillaghegyi Vörös Lobogó | 3 / 14 | 31 |
| 1952 | 2 | Csillaghegyi Vörös Lobogó | 3 / 18 | 44 |
| 1953 | 2 | Csillaghegyi Vörös Lobogó | 6 / 16 | 36 |
| 1954 | 2 | Csillaghegyi Vörös Lobogó | 12 / 16 | 26 |
| 1955 | 3 | Csillaghegy | 8 / 16 | 32 |
| 1956 | 3 | Csillaghegyi Vörös Lobogó | 2 / 14 | 35 |
| 1957 | 3 | Csillaghegyi MTE | 3 / 8 | 16 |
| 1957–58 | 3 | Csillaghegyi MTE | 12 / 16 | 24 |
| 1958–59 | 4 | Csillaghegy | 2 / 16 | 45 |
| 1959–60 | 4 | Csillaghegyi MTE | 7 / 16 | 33 |
| 1960–61 | 4 | Csillaghegyi MTE | 1 / 16 | 43 |
| 1961–62 | 3 | Csillaghegyi MTE | 16 / 16 | 16 |
| 1962–63 | 4 | Csillaghegyi MTE | 9 / 16 | 28 |
| 1963 | 5 | Csillaghegy | 2 / 16 | 19 |
| 1964 | 5 | Csillaghegy | 6 / 16 | 33 |
| 1965 | 5 | Csillaghegy | 8 / 14 | 23 |
| 1966 | 5 | Csillaghegyi MTE | 13 / 14 | 18 |
| 1967 | 5 | Csillaghegyi MTE | 12 / 16 | 28 |
| 1968 | 5 | Csillaghegyi MTE | 11 / 18 | 35 |
| 1969 | 5 | Csillaghegyi MTE | 1 / 18 | 48 |
| 1970 | 4 | Csillaghegyi MTE | 11 / 16 | 13 |
| 1970–71 | 4 | Csillaghegyi MTE | 16 / 16 | 17 |
| 1971–72 | 5 | Csillaghegyi MTE | 9 / 16 | 29 |
| 1972–73 | 5 | Csillaghegy | 10 / 16 | 26 |
| 1973–74 | 5 | Csillaghegyi MTE | 7 / 16 | 32 |
| 1974–75 | 5 | Csillaghegy | 13 / 16 | 26 |
| 1977–78 | 6 | Csillaghegy | 4 / 16 | 38 |
| 1978–79 | 5 | Csillaghegy | 4 / 16 | 34 |
| 1979–80 | 5 | Csillaghegy | 10 / 16 | 29 |
| 1980–81 | 5 | Csillaghegyi MTE | 2 / 15 | 43 |
| 1981–82 | 5 | Csillaghegy | 14 / 16 | 20 |
| 1982–83 | 5 | Csillaghegy | 13 / 16 | 24 |
| 1983–84 | 5 | Csillaghegyi MTE | 6 / 16 | 34 |
| 1984–85 | 5 | Csillaghegyi MTE | 12 / 16 | 23 |
| 1985–86 | 5 | Csillaghegyi MTE | 14 / 16 | 21 |
| 1990–91 | 6 | Csillaghegy | 1 / 16 | 51 |
| 1991–92 | 5 | Csillaghegyi MTE | 7 / 16 | 33 |
| 1992–93 | 5 | Csillaghegyi MTE | 5 / 16 | 34 |
| 1993–94 | 5 | Csillaghegyi MTE | 12 / 16 | 22 |
| 1994–95 | 5 | Csillaghegyi MTE | 11 / 16 | 35 |
| 1995–96 | 5 | Csillaghegyi MTE | 9 / 16 | 25 |
| 1996–97 | 5 | Csillaghegyi MTE | 11 / 14 | 22 |
| 1997–98 | 6 | Csillaghegyi MTE | 7 / 16 | 54 |
| 1998–99 | 6 | Csillaghegyi MTE | 2 / 16 | 65 |
| 1999–00 | 5 | Csillaghegyi MTE | 14 / 16 | 29 |
| 2000–01 | 6 | Csillaghegyi MTE | 2 / 16 | 68 |
| 2001–02 | 5 | Csillaghegyi MTE | 15 / 16 | 20 |
| 2002–03 | 6 | Csillaghegyi MTE | 2 / 16 | 63 |
| 2003–04 | 6 | Csillaghegyi MTE | 1 / 16 | 73 |
| 2004–05 | 5 | Csillaghegyi MTE | 5 / 16 | 47 |
| 2005–06 | 4 | Csillaghegyi MTE | 6 / 16 | 42 |
| 2006–07 | 4 | Csillaghegyi MTE | 11 / 18 | 45 |
| 2007–08 | 4 | Csillaghegyi MTE 1904 | 1 / 18 | 72 |
| 2008–09 | 3 | Csillaghegyi MTE | 16 / 16 | 14 |
| 2009–10 | 4 | Csillaghegyi MTE | 16 / 16 | 12 |
| 2010–11 | 5 | Csillaghegyi MTE | 12 / 16 | 36 |
| 2011–12 | 4 | CSMTE- FC Rojik KFT | 15 / 16 | 23 |
| 2012–13 | 5 | CSMTE- FC Rojik KFT | 4 / 16 | 55 |
| 2013–14 | 5 | Csillaghegyi MTE | 5 / 16 | 50 |
| 2014–15 | 5 | Csillaghegyi MTE | 11 / 16 | 35 |
| 2015–16 | 5 | Csillaghegyi MTE | 11 / 16 | 32 |
| 2016–17 | 5 | Csillaghegyi MTE | 16 / 16 | 21 |
| 2017–18 | 6 | Csillaghegyi MTE | 2 / 14 | 49 |
| 2018–19 | 6 | Csillaghegyi MTE | 3 / 14 | 56 |
| 2019–20 | 6 | Csillaghegyi MTE | 2 / 14 | 38 |
| 2020–21 | 6 | Csillaghegyi MTE | 5 / 14 | 43 |
| 2021–22 | 5 | Csillaghegyi MTE | 14 / 14 | 1 |
| 2022–23 | 6 | Csillaghegyi MTE | 8 / 14 | 28 |
| 2023–24 | 6 | Csillaghegyi MTE | 14 / 16 | 22 |
| 2024–25 | 6 | Csillaghegyi MTE | 12 / 13 | 19 |
| 2025–26 | 6 | Csillaghegyi MTE | 13 / 14 | 17 |

== Managers ==
- Sándor Pintér
