= Szombathelyi Pamut SE =

Hungarian football club

- Full name: Szombathelyi Pamut SE
- Founded: 1951
- Ground: Pamut-pálya
Home colours

Szombathelyi Pamut SE is a defunct professional football club based in Szombathely, Vas County, Hungary.

== Background ==
The club was financed by the cotton factory, Pamutgyár, that was established in 1900. The founders were Móric Doctor and Ede Doctor. The factory was socilized in 1948 at the start of the Communism in Hungary.

== History ==
Szombathelyi Pamut SE won the 1949–50 Nemzeti Bajnokság III season, as Szombathelyi Szakszervezeti MTE.

== Name changes ==
- 1949: merger with Szombathelyi AK, Szombathelyi Bőrgyár and Szombathelyi Textil SE
- Szombathelyi Szakszervezeti MTE: 1949 - 1951
- 1951: the united teams were disbanded
- Szombathelyi Vörös Lobogó Pamut SK: 1951 - 1956
- Szombathelyi Pamutipari SK: 1956 - 1981
- Latex Pamut SE: 1981 - ?
- Latex-Pamut Formen 2000 SE: ? - 1996
- Szombathelyi Latex Pamut SE: 1996 - 1997
- 1997: merger with Csempeszkopács SE

== Honours ==
- Nemzeti Bajnokság III:
  - Winners (1): 1950

== Seasons ==
The table below shows the seasons of Szombathelyi Pamut SE.

Season	Tier	Club's name	Position	Pts
1949–50	3	Szombathelyi Szakszervezeti MTE	1 / 16	43
1950	2	Szombathelyi SzMTE	5 / 16	16
1951	2	Szombathelyi Vörös Lobogó	12 / 14	19
1952	2	Szombathelyi Vörös Lobogó	4 / 18	40
1953	2	Szombathelyi Vörös Lobogó	12 / 16	24
1954	2	Szombathelyi Vörös Lobogó	10 / 16	29
1955	3	Szombathelyi Vörös Lobogó	2 / 14	36
1956	3	Szombathelyi Pamutipar	1 / 14	47
1957	2	Szombathelyi Pamutipar	5 / 8	14
1957–58	2	Szombathelyi Pamutipar SC	15 / 19	30
1958–59	3	Szombathelyi Pamutipar	7 / 16	33
1959–60	3	Szombathelyi Pamutipar SC	7 / 17	30
1960–61	3	Szombathelyi Pamutipar	11 / 16	26
1961–62	3	Szombathelyi Pamutipar	12 / 16	23
1962–63	3	Szombathelyi Pamutipar	15 / 16	17
1963	4	Szombathelyi Pamutipar	12 / 16	14
1964	4	Szombathelyi Pamutipar	11 / 17	26
1965	4	Szombathelyi Pamutipar	11 / 16	28
1966	4	Szombathelyi Pamutipar	16 / 16	18
1967	5	Szombathelyi Pamut	4 / 14	31
1968	5	Szombathelyi Pamut	3 / 14	35
1969	5	Szombathelyi Pamutipar	3 / 14	34
1970	5	Szombathelyi Pamutipar	7 / 14	15
1970–71	5	Szombathelyi Pamutipar	2 / 14	35
1971–72	5	Szombathelyi Pamutipar	10 / 14	24
1972–73	5	Szombathelyi Pamutipar	10 / 18	24
1973–74	5	Szombathelyi Pamutipar	9 / 15	27
1974–75	4	Szombathelyi Pamutipar	5 / 16	36
1975–76	4	Szombathelyi Pamutipar	3 / 16	41
1976–77	4	Szombathelyi Pamut	1 / 16	45
1977–78	4	Szombathelyi Pamutipar	5 / 16	35
1978–79	3	Szombathelyi Pamutipar	7 / 16	28
1979–80	3	Szombathelyi Pamut	5 / 16	33
1980–81	3	Szombathelyi Pamut	14 / 18	23
1981–82	4	Latex Pamut SE	10 / 16	24
1982–83	4	Szombathelyi Pamut	14 / 16	20
1986–87	6	Szombathelyi Pamut	2 / 12	36
1987–88	5	Szombathelyi Latex Pamut	8 / 14	21
1988–89	5	Latex Pamut	1 / 14	39
1989–90	4	Latex Pamut	14 / 16	27
1990–91	4	LTV Pamut	4 / 16	38
1991–92	4	LTV Pamut	10 / 16	31
1992–93	4	Latex Pamut	14 / 16	25
1993–94	5	Szombathelyi LTV Pamut	7 / 16	33
1994–95	5	Pamut Formen	2 / 17	63
1995–96	4	Latex-Pamut Formen 2000 SE	9 / 16	38
1996–97	4	Szombathelyi Latex Pamut SE	8 / 18	45
