= List of Országos Bajnokság I (men's water polo) clubs =

The following is a list of clubs who have played in the OB I water polo league at any time since its formation in 1904. OB I teams playing in the 2014-15 season are highlighted in green.

No.	Club	City	Number of seasons	Winners	Seasons in the OB I
1.	Ferencváros	Budapest	105	21	1904, 1905, 1909, 1910, 1911, 1912, 1913, 1918, 1919, 1920, 1921, 1922, 1923, 1924, 1925, 1926, 1927, 1928, 1929, 1930, 1931, 1932, 1933, 1934, 1935, 1936, 1937, 1938, 1939, 1940, 1941, 1942, 1943, 1944, 1945, 1946, 1947, 1948, 1949, 1950, 1951, 1952, 1953, 1954, 1955, 1956, 1957, 1958, 1959, 1960, 1961, 1962, 1963, 1964, 1965, 1966, 1967, 1968, 1969, 1970, 1971, 1972, 1973, 1974, 1975, 1976, 1977, 1978, 1979, 1980, 1981, 1982, 1983, 1984, 1984–85, 1985–86, 1986–87, 1987–88, 1988–89, 1989–90, 1990–91, 1991–92, 1992–93, 1993–94, 1994–95, 1995–96, 1996–97, 1997–98, 1998–99, 1999–00, 2000–01, 2001–02, 2002–03, 2003–04, 2004–05, 2005–06, 2006–07, 2007–08, 2008–09, 2009–10, 2010–11, 2011–12, 2012–13, 2013–14, 2014–15
2.	Újpest	Budapest	87	26	1925, 1926, 1927, 1928, 1929, 1930, 1931, 1932, 1933, 1934, 1935, 1936, 1937, 1938, 1939, 1940, 1941, 1942, 1943, 1944, 1945, 1946, 1947, 1948, 1949, 1950, 1951, 1952, 1953, 1954, 1955, 1956, 1957, 1958, 1959, 1960, 1961, 1962, 1963, 1964, 1965, 1966, 1967, 1968, 1969, 1970, 1971, 1972, 1973, 1974, 1975, 1976, 1977, 1978, 1979, 1980, 1981, 1982, 1983, 1984, 1984–85, 1985–86, 1986–87, 1987–88, 1988–89, 1989–90, 1990–91, 1991–92, 1992–93, 1993–94, 1994–95, 1995–96, 1996–97, 1997–98, 1998–99, 1999–00, 2000–01, 2001–02, 2002–03, 2003–04, 2004–05, 2005–06, 2006–07, 2007–08, 2008–09, 2009–10, 2010–11, R, D
3.	Eger	Eger	79	3	1929, 1930, 1931, 1932, 1933, 1934, 1935, R, 1938, 1939, 1940, R, 1945, 1946, 1947, 1948, 1949, 1950, 1951, 1952, 1953, 1954, 1955, 1956, 1957, R, 1959, 1960, 1961, 1962, 1963, 1964, 1965, 1966, 1967, 1968, 1969, 1970, 1971, 1972, 1973, 1974, 1975, 1976, 1977, 1978, R, 1980, 1981, 1982, 1983, 1984, 1984–85, 1985–86, 1986–87, 1987–88, 1988–89, 1989–90, 1990–91, 1991–92, 1992–93, 1993–94, 1994–95, 1995–96, 1996–97, 1997–98, 1998–99, 1999–00, 2000–01, 2001–02, 2002–03, 2003–04, 2004–05, 2005–06, 2006–07, 2007–08, 2008–09, 2009–10, 2010–11, 2011–12, 2012–13, 2013–14, 2014–15
4.	Vasas	Budapest	68	18	1945, 1946, 1947, 1948, 1949, 1950, 1951, 1952, 1953, 1954, 1955, 1956, 1957, 1958, 1959, 1960, 1961, 1962, 1963, 1964, R, 1968, 1969, 1970, 1971, 1972, 1973, 1974, 1975, 1976, 1977, 1978, 1979, 1980, 1981, 1982, 1983, 1984, 1984–85, 1985–86, 1986–87, 1987–88, 1988–89, 1989–90, 1990–91, 1991–92, 1992–93, 1993–94, 1994–95, 1995–96, 1996–97, 1997–98, 1998–99, 1999–00, 2000–01, 2001–02, 2002–03, 2003–04, 2004–05, 2005–06, 2006–07, 2007–08, 2008–09, 2009–10, 2010–11, 2011–12, 2012–13, 2013–14, 2014–15
5.	BVSC	Budapest	65	7	1950, 1951, 1952, 1953, 1954, 1955, 1956, 1957, 1958, 1959, 1960, 1961, 1962, 1963, 1964, 1965, 1966, 1967, 1968, 1969, 1970, R, 1972, 1973, 1974, 1975, 1976, 1977, 1978, 1979, 1980, 1981, 1982, 1983, 1984, 1984–85, 1985–86, 1986–87, 1987–88, 1988–89, 1989–90, 1990–91, 1991–92, 1992–93, 1993–94, 1994–95, 1995–96, 1996–97, 1997–98, 1998–99, 1999–00, 2000–01, 2001–02, 2002–03, 2003–04, 2004–05, 2005–06, 2006–07, 2007–08, 2008–09, 2009–10, 2010–11, 2011–12, 2012–13, 2013–14, 2014–15
5.	Szolnok	Szolnok	65	6	1950, 1951, 1952, 1953, 1954, 1955, 1956, 1957, 1958, 1959, 1960, 1961, 1962, 1963, 1964, 1965, 1966, 1967, 1968, 1969, 1970, 1971, 1972, R, 1974, 1975, 1976, 1977, 1978, 1979, 1980, 1981, 1982, 1983, 1984, 1984–85, 1985–86, 1986–87, 1987–88, 1988–89, 1989–90, 1990–91, 1991–92, 1992–93, 1993–94, 1994–95, 1995–96, 1996–97, 1997–98, 1998–99, 1999–00, 2000–01, 2001–02, 2002–03, 2003–04, 2004–05, 2005–06, 2006–07, 2007–08, 2008–09, 2009–10, 2010–11, 2011–12, 2012–13, 2013–14, 2014–15
7.	Honvéd	Budapest	55	6	1950, 1951, 1952, 1953, 1954, 1955, 1956, 1957, 1958, 1959, 1960, 1961, 1962, 1963, 1964, 1965, 1966, 1967, 1968, 1969, 1970, 1971, 1972, 1973, 1974, 1975, 1976, 1977, R, 1979, 1980, 1981, 1982, 1983, 1984, 1984–85, 1985–86, 1986–87, 1987–88, 1988–89, R, 1998–99, 1999–00, 2000–01, 2001–02, 2002–03, 2003–04, 2004–05, 2005–06, 2006–07, 2007–08, 2008–09, 2009–10, 2010–11, 2011–12, 2012–13, 2013–14, 2014–15
8.	OSC	Budapest	50	7	1964, 1965, 1966, 1967, 1968, 1969, 1970, 1971, 1972, 1973, 1974, 1975, 1976, 1977, 1978, 1979, 1980, 1981, 1982, 1983, 1984, 1984–85, 1985–86, 1986–87, 1987–88, 1988–89, 1989–90, 1990–91, 1991–92, 1992–93, 1993–94, R, 1995–96, 1996–97, 1997–98, 1998–99, R, 2000–01, 2001–02, 2002–03, 2003–04, 2004–05, 2005–06, 2006–07, 2007–08, 2008–09, 2009–10, 2010–11, 2011–12, 2012–13, 2013–14, 2014–15
9.	Szentes	Szentes	46	0	1948, 1949, R, 1960, R, 1962, R, 1973, 1974, 1975, 1976, 1977, 1978, 1979, 1980, 1981, 1982, R, 1984, 1984–85, 1985–86, 1986–87, 1987–88, 1988–89, 1989–90, 1990–91, 1991–92, 1992–93, 1993–94, 1994–95, 1995–96, 1996–97, 1997–98, 1998–99, 1999–00, 2000–01, 2001–02, 2002–03, 2003–04, 2004–05, 2005–06, 2006–07, 2007–08, 2008–09, 2009–10, 2010–11, 2011–12, 2012–13, 2013–14, 2014–15
10.	Bp. Spartacus	Budapest	42	0	1956, 1957, 1958, 1959, 1960, 1961, 1962, 1963, 1964, 1965, 1966, 1967, 1968, 1969, 1970, 1971, 1972, 1973, 1974, 1975, 1976, 1977, 1978, 1979, 1980, 1981, 1982, 1983, 1984, 1984–85, 1985–86, 1986–87, 1987–88, 1988–89, 1989–90, 1990–91, 1991–92, 1993–94, 1994–95, 1995–96, 1996–97, 1997–98, R, D
11.	MTK	Budapest	36	0	1911, 1912, 1917, R, 1926, 1927, 1928, 1929, 1930, 1931, 1932, 1933, 1934, 1935, 1936, 1937, 1938, 1939, 1940, 1941, R, 1945, 1946, 1947, 1948, 1949, 1950, 1951, 1952, 1953, 1954, 1955, 1956, 1957, 1958, R, 1960, 1961, R, 1969, R, (BVLSZ)
12.	Tatabányai SC	Tatabánya	26	0	1934, R, 1940, 1941, 1942, 1943, 1944, 1945, 1946, R, 1949, 1950, R, 1952, R, 1971, R, 1978, 1979, 1980, 1981, 1982, 1983, 1984, 1984–85, 1985–86, 1986–87, 1987–88, 1988–89, 1989–90, 1990–91, R, 2001–02, R, (OB I/B)
13.	III. Kerületi TVE	Budapest	24	3	1919, 1920, 1921, 1922, 1923, 1924, 1925, 1926, 1927, 1928, 1929, 1930, 1931, 1932, 1933, 1934, 1935, 1936, 1937, 1938, 1939, 1940, 1941, R, 1949, R, D
14.	Magyar AC	Budapest	23	2	1921, 1922, 1923, 1924, 1925, 1926, 1927, 1928, 1929, 1930, 1931, 1932, 1933, 1934, 1935, 1936, 1937, 1938, 1939, 1940, 1941, 1942, 1943, 1944, R, D
15.	Vasas Izzó	Budapest	22	0	1953, 1954, R, 1960, 1961, 1962, 1963, R, 1965, 1966, 1967, R, 1970, 1971, 1972, 1973, 1974, 1975, 1976, 1977, 1978, 1979, 1980, 1981, 1982, R, D
16.	Szeged	Szeged	21	0	1993–94, 1994–95, 1995–96, 1996–97, 1997–98, 1998–99, R, 2000–01, 2001–02, 2002–03, 2003–04, 2004–05, 2005–06, 2006–07, 2007–08, 2008–09, 2009–10, 2010–11, 2011–12, 2012–13, 2013–14, 2014–15
17.	Nemzeti SC	Budapest	20	0	1919, 1920, 1921, 1922, 1923, 1924, 1925, 1926, 1927, 1928, 1929, R, 1931, R, 1939, 1940, 1941, 1942, R, 1946, 1947, 1948, 1949, R, D
17.	Szegedi EOL SC	Szeged	20	0	1974, 1975, 1976, 1977, 1978, 1979, 1980, 1981, 1982, 1983, 1984, 1984–85, 1985–86, 1986–87, 1987–88, 1988–89, 1989–90, 1990–91, 1991–92, 1992–93, R, D
19.	Műegyetemi AFC	Budapest	18	1	1913, 1917, 1918, 1919, 1920, 1921, 1922, 1923, 1924, 1925, R, 1943, 1944, R, 1946, 1947, 1948, R, 1997–98, 1998–99, R, 2000–01, R, (OB I/B)
20.	MMÚE	Budapest	17	4	1905, 1906, 1907, 1908, 1909, R, 1924, R, 1927, R, 1930, R, 1933, R, 1937, R, 1942, 1943, 1944, 1945, 1946, 1947, R, D
21.	Csepel SC	Budapest	16	0	1943, 1944, 1945, R, 1946, 1947, R, 1951, R, 1954, 1955, 1956, R, 1961, R, 1963, 1964, 1965, 1966, 1967, 1968, R, D
21.	Tungsram SC	Budapest	16	0	1958, 1959, R, 1983, 1984, 1984–85, 1985–86, 1986–87, 1987–88, 1988–89, 1989–90, 1990–91, 1991–92, 1992–93, 1993–94, 1994–95, 1995–96, R, D
23.	KSI SE	Budapest	14	0	1983, R, 1984–85, R, 1988–89, R, 1991–92, 1992–93, 1993–94, 1994–95, 1995–96, 1996–97, R, 1999–00, 2000–01, 2001–02, R, 2013–14, 2014–15
24.	Szegedi ÚE	Szeged	12	0	1929, 1930, 1931, 1932, 1933, 1934, 1935, 1936, 1937, 1938, 1939, R, 1944, R, (OB II)
25.	BEAC	Budapest	11	0	1935, 1936, 1937, 1938, 1939, 1940, 1941, 1942, 1943, R, 1998–99, 1999–00, R, (BVLSZ)
26.	Pécsi VSK	Pécs	10	0	2005–06, 2006–07, 2007–08, 2008–09, 2009–10, 2010–11, 2011–12, 2012–13, 2013–14, 2014–15
27.	BSE	Budapest	9	1	1936, 1937, 1938, 1939, 1940, 1941, 1942, 1943, 1944, R, D
28.	BKV Előre SC	Budapest	8	0	1929, 1930, 1931, 1932, 1947, R, 1949, 1950, 1951, R, D
28.	Vörös Meteor	Budapest	8	0	1952, R, 1954, 1955, R, 1957, 1958, 1959, 1960, 1961, R, D
30.	Hódmezővásárhely	Hódmezővásárhely	5	0	1981, R, 1984, R, 1994–95, 1996–97, 1997–98, R, (OB I/B)
30.	Kecskeméti VSC	Kecskemét	5	0	1985–86, 1986–87, 1987–88, R, 2001–02, 2002–03, R, (OB I/B)
30.	Debrecen	Debrecen	5	0	2010–11, 2011–12, 2012–13, 2013–14, 2014–15
33.	Kaposvár	Kaposvár	4	0	2011–12, 2012–13, 2013–14, 2014–15
34.	Balatoni ÚE	Siófok	3	2	1904, 1905, 1906, R, D
34.	Óbuda TE	Budapest	3	0	1905, R, 1928, R, 1942, R, D
34.	Vívó és Atlétikai Club	Budapest	3	0	1923, 1924, 1925, R, D
34.	Volán SC	Budapest	3	0	1980, R, 1982, 1983, R, D
34.	Ceglédi VSE	Cegléd	3	0	1992–93, R, 2002–03, 2003–04, R, (OB I/B)
34.	Neptun VSC	Budapest	3	0	2004–05, 2005–06, 2006–07, R, (OB I/B)
40.	Gamma SE	Budafok	2	0	1904, R, 1944, R, D
40.	BBTE	Budapest	2	0	1932, 1933, R, D
40.	Erzsébeti TC	Pesterzsébet	2	0	1942, 1943, R, D
40.	Marosvásárhelyi SE (now in Romania)	Marosvásárhely	2	0	1943, 1944, R, D
40.	Tipográfia NyTE	Budapest	2	0	1946, 1947, R, D
40.	Szegedi MTE	Szeged	2	0	1947, 1948, R, D
40.	Szegedi Dózsa	Szeged	2	0	1953, 1954, R, D
40.	Szent István University	Gödöllő	2	0	2003–04, 2004–05, R, (OB II)
40.	Fehérvár Póló SE	Székesfehérvár	2	0	2007–08, 2008–09, R, (OB II)
49.	Postatakarékpénztár SE	Budapest	1	0	1904, D
49.	Szegedi VSE	Szeged	1	0	1941, R, (OB I/B)
49.	Közalkalmazottak SE	Budapest	1	0	1948, R, D
49.	Angyalföldi Sportiskola DSE	Budapest	1	0	2010–11, R, (OB I/B)
49.	Eszterházy Károly College	Eger	1	0	2012–13, R, (OB I/B)
49.	YBL Waterpolo Club	Budapest	1	0	2013–14, R, (OB I/B)
49.	UVSE	Budapest	1	0	2014–15

== See also ==
- Országos Bajnokság I
- The bolded teams are currently playing in the 2014-15 season of the Hungarian League.
- **R** = Relegated from the OB I
- **D** = Dissolved
- List of Nemzeti Bajnokság I clubs (football)
- List of Nemzeti Bajnokság I (men's handball) clubs
