= Újpesti TE =

Sports club in Budapest, Hungary

- Full name: Újpesti Torna Egylet
- Nickname: Lilák (Purples); Dózsa
- Short name: UTE
- Founded: 16 June 1885; 141 years ago
- Colours: Purple and white
- Chairman: István Őze
- Website: Újpesti TE

Újpesti Torna Egylet (Újpesti TE or UTE) is a Hungarian sports society, based in Újpest, Budapest. The club, which was founded in 1885, includes sports sections that represent the club at ice hockey, men's water polo, women's volleyball, athletics, wrestling, judo, mud wrestling, flatwater canoeing/kayaking, karate, youth football, boxing, modern pentathlon, shooting, gymnastics, triathlon, swimming, and fencing. There is a leisure section and a section for the club's fans called 'circle of friends' (baráti kör).

The football team Újpest FC is also a part of the Újpesti TE family.

== Departments ==
=== Team sports ===
- Football:
  - men's football (since 1885)
  - women's football
- Ice hockey:
  - men's ice hockey (since 1930)
  - women's ice hockey
- Volleyball:
  - women's volleyball (1948–1990, since 1950)
- Curling

=== Individual sports ===
- Athletics (since 1903)
- Boxing (since 1926)
- Canoeing (since 1951)
- Gymnastics
- Fencing (since 1922)
- Footgolf
- Judo
- Karate
- Modern pentathlon (since 1962)
- Shooting
- Swimming (since 1910)
- Skating
- Taekwondo (since 2005)
- Triathlon (since 1991)
- Wrestling
- E-sports

=== Dissolved departments ===
- Water polo:
  - men's water polo (1891–2011)
- Volleyball:
  - men's volleyball
- Handball:
  - men's handball
  - women's handball

== Supporters and rivalries ==
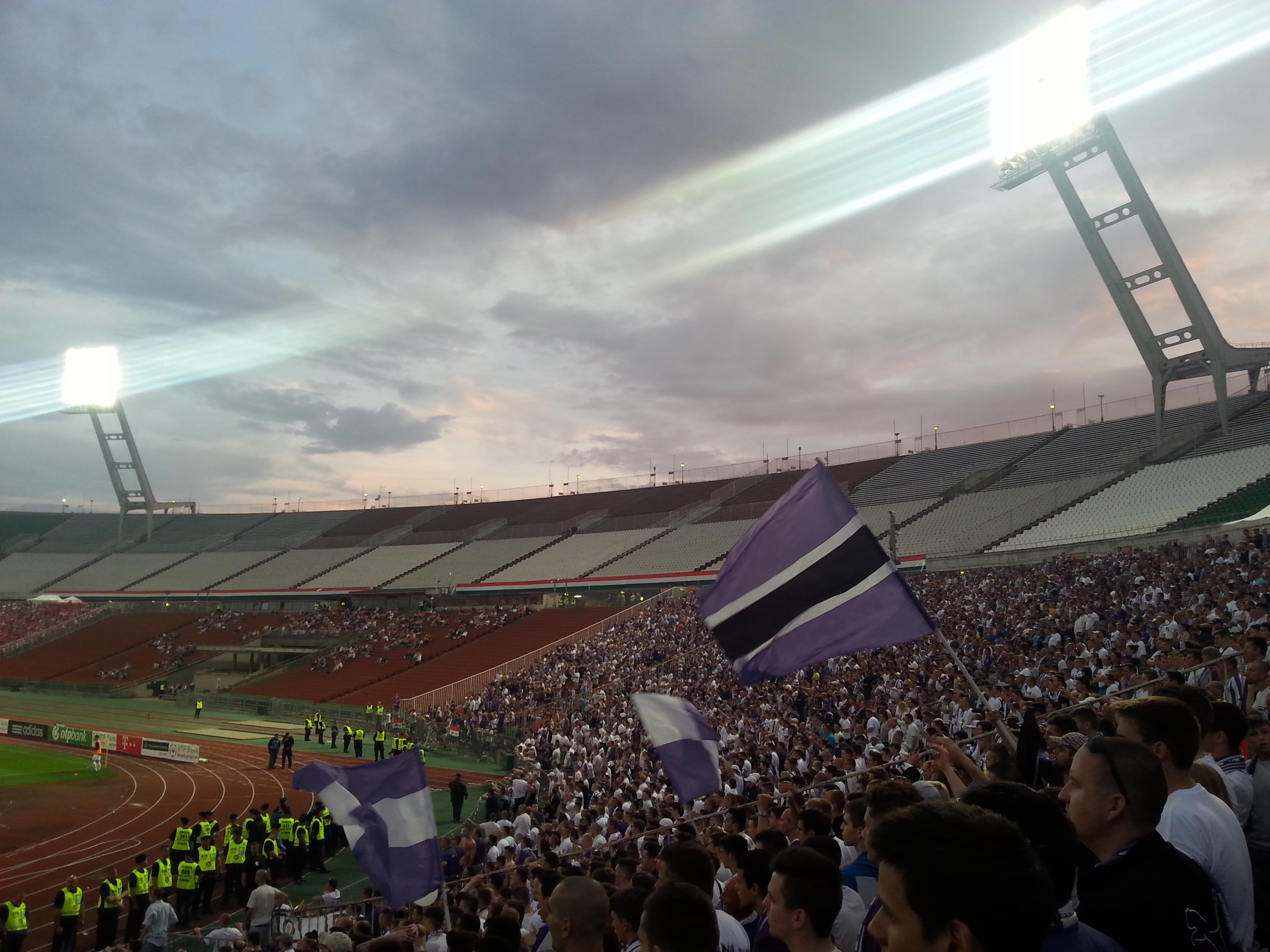
Újpest supporters in the Ferenc Puskás Stadium on 25 May 2014

=== Supporters ===
Supporters of Újpest are mainly from the fourth district of Budapest, the eponymous Újpest. Due to the success in the 1970s, the club gained supporters from all over Budapest and the country.

==== Notable supporters ====
- Zoltán Zana ("Ganxta Zolee"), rapper and actor
- Henrik Havas, journalist and television personality)
- György Gyula Zagyva, politician
- András Stohl, actor and television personality
- Zsolt Wintermantel, politician and former mayor of Újpest)
- Attila Széki ("Curtis"), rapper and former footballer
- Péter Majoros ("Majka"), rapper and television personality

=== Rivalries ===
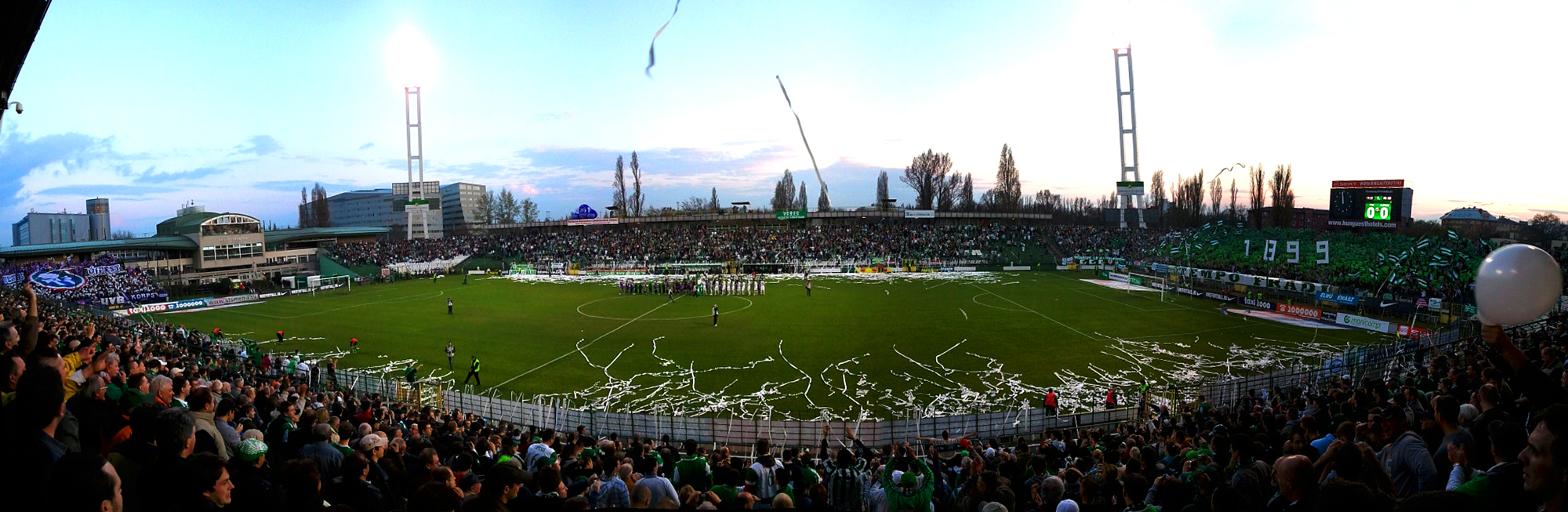
Ferencváros-Újpest derby at the Albert Stadion on 1 April 2011

Újpest are in rivalry with several teams from Budapest including Ferencváros, MTK Budapest, Budapest Honvéd and several provincial clubs such as Debrecen and Diósgyőr. Since Újpest have been the third most successful club of the Hungarian Football history by winning 20 Hungarian League titles and 9 Hungarian Cup titles and the most successful Hungarian club in the European football competitions in the 1970s every club in the Hungarian League wants to defeat them.

The rivalry with Ferencváros dates back to 1930s when Újpest won their first Hungarian League title. Since then the fixture between the two teams attracts the most spectators in the domestic league. The matches between the two team often ends in violence which causes big trouble for the Hungarian football. The proposal of personal registration was refused by both clubs.

== Honours ==
=== Active departments ===
==== Football (men's) ====
- Hungarian Championship
  - Winners (20): 1929–30, 1930–31, 1932–33, 1934–35, 1938–39, 1945, 1945–46, 1946–47, 1959–60, 1969, 1970, 1970–71, 1971–72, 1972–73, 1973–74, 1974–75, 1977–78, 1978–79, 1989–90, 1997–98
- Hungarian Second League:
  - Winners (2): 1904, 1911–12
- Hungarian Cup
  - Winners (11): 1969, 1970, 1974–75, 1981–82, 1982–83, 1986–87, 1991–92, 2001–02, 2013–14, 2017–18, 2020–21
- Hungarian Super Cup (defunct)
  - Winners (3): 1992, 2002, 2014
- Mitropa Cup (defunct)
  - Winners (2): 1929, 1939
- Coupe des Nations (defunct, predecessor of Champions League)
  - Winner (1): 1930
- Joan Gamper Trophy:
  - Winner (1): 1970
- Trofeo Colombino: (defunct)
  - Winner (1): 1971

==== Ice hockey (men's) ====
- Hungarian Championship:
  - Winners (13): 1957–58, 1959–60, 1964–65, 1965–66, 1967–68, 1968–69, 1969–70, 1981–82, 1982–83, 1984–85, 1985–86, 1986–87, 1987–88
- Hungarian Cup:
  - Winners (9): 1964–65, 1965–66, 1969–70, 1970–71, 1971–72, 1984–85, 1985–86, 1987–88, 1989–90
- Peace Cup:
  - Winners (5): 1957, 1958, 1959, 1961, 1962

==== Volleyball (women's) ====
- Hungarian Championship
  - Winners (10): 1962–63, 1964, 1965, 1966, 1967, 1968, 1970, 1985–86, 1986–87, 1989–90
- Hungarian Cup
  - Winners (12): 1961–62, 1962–63, 1964, 1965, 1966, 1967, 1968, 1974, 1975, 1983–84, 1985–86, 1986–87

=== Inactive departments ===
==== Water polo (men's) ====
- Hungarian Championship
  - Winners (26) (record): 1930, 1931, 1932, 1933, 1934, 1935, 1936, 1937, 1938, 1939, 1941, 1942, 1945, 1946, 1948, 1950, 1951, 1952, 1955, 1960, 1967, 1985–86, 1990–91, 1992–93, 1993–94, 1994–95
- Hungarian Cup
  - Winners (19): 1929, 1931, 1932, 1933, 1934, 1935, 1936, 1938, 1939, 1944, 1948, 1951, 1952, 1955, 1960, 1963, 1975, 1990–91, 1992–93
- LEN Champions League (as European Cup)
  - Winner (1): 1993–94
- LEN Euro Cup (as LEN Trophy)
  - Winners (3): 1992–93, 1996–97, 1998–99
- LEN Super Cup
  - Winner (1): 1994

==== Volleyball (men's) ====
- Hungarian Championship
  - Winners (13): 1955, 1957, 1957–58, 1958–59, 1959–60, 1960–61, 1961–62, 1962–63, 1971, 1972, 1975, 1989–90, 1990–91
- Hungarian Cup
  - Winners (8): 1952, 1955, 1957, 1961–62, 1964, 1973, 1975, 1988–89

==== Handball (men's) ====
- Hungarian Championship
  - Winners (2): 1953, 1958
- Hungarian Cup
  - Winners (2): 1951, 1956

=== International honours ===
season	men's football	men's water polo	women's volleyball	men's volleyball
1929	Mitropa Cup Winners			
1930	Coupe des Nations Winners			
1939	Mitropa Cup Winners			
1961–62	Cup Winners' Cup Semi-finals			
1966–67	Mitropa Cup Final			
1968–69	Inter-Cities Fairs Cup Final			
1973–74	European Cup Semi-finals			
1974–75				Cup Winners' Cup Fourth place
1976–77			Cup Winners' Cup Third place	
1985–86			Cup Winners' Cup Third place	
1986–87		European Cup Semi-finals		
1992–93		LEN Cup Winners		
1993–94		European Cup Winners		
1994–95		European Cup Final		
1995–96		European Cup Final		
1996–97		LEN Cup Winners		
1998–99		LEN Cup Winners		

== Notable former players ==
=== Olympic champions ===
- István Barta, water polo
- Olivér Halassy water polo
- Endre Kabos fencing (sabre)
- János Németh water polo
- Mihály Bozsi, water polo
- Károly Kárpáti, wrestling
- György Kutasi water polo
- Miklós Szilvásy, wrestling
- Dezső Gyarmati, water polo
- Dezső Lemhényi water polo
- Miklós Martin water polo
- György Vízvári water polo
- János Urányi, canoe sprint
- László Fábián, canoe sprint
- Ágnes Keleti, gymnastics
- Mihály Mayer, water polo
- Imre Polyák, wrestling (Greco-Roman)
- Paula Marosi, fencing (foil)
- Ildikó Rejtő, fencing (foil)
- Ferenc Bene, football
- Zoltán Dömötör, water polo
- Gyula Zsivótzky, athletics (hammer throw)
- Antal Dunai, football
- László Fazekas, football
- László Nagy, football
- Ernő Noskó, football
- Tibor Cservenyák, water polo
- László Sárosi, water polo
- Norbert Növényi, wrestling (Greco-Roman)
- Tamás Darnyi, swimming
- Attila Mizsér, pentathlon
- Bence Szabó, fencing (sabre)
- László Csongrádi, fencing (sabre)
- Péter Farkas, wrestling (Greco-Roman)
- Kinga Czigány, canoe sprint
- Éva Dónusz, canoe sprint
- Erika Mészáros, canoe sprint
- Krisztián Berki, gymnastics (pommel horse)
- Danuta Kozák, canoe sprint
- Sándor Tótka, canoe sprint

== Presidents ==
List of the presidents of the Újpesti TE:

- 1885–1887: János Goll
- 1887–1892: Lajos Mády
- 1892–1897: Béla Csepcsányi
- 1897–:
- –1903:
- 1903–1905: Arnold Kada
- 1905–: Mór Oszmann
- 1909–: Samu Blum
- 1910–: Lehel Héderváry
- 1914–: Ödön Kálmán
- 1919–1925: János Szücs
- 1925–1942: Lipót Aschner
