= Ferencvárosi TC (men's water polo) =

Water polo club in Budapest, Hungary

FTC Telekom
- Full name: Ferencvárosi Torna Club
- Nickname: Zöld Sasok (The Green Eagles); Fradi
- Short name: FTC
- Founded: 1904; 122 years ago (parent club in 1899)
- League: Országos Bajnokság I
- Based in: Budapest, Hungary
- Arena: Népliget; Komjádi Béla Sportuszoda
- Colors: Green and white
- President: József Farkas
- Head coach: Balázs Nyéki
- Championships: 3 Champions League; 2 Euro Cup; 4 Cup Winners' Cup; 4 LEN Super Cup; 26 Hungarian Championships; 23 Hungarian Cups; 1 Hungarian Super Cups
- 2023–24: Országos Bajnokság I, 1st of 14 (champions)
- Website: fradi.hu

Ferencvárosi Torna Club is a professional water polo club from Budapest, Hungary. The team competes in the Országos Bajnokság I.

== Naming history ==
- Ferencvárosi Torna Club (FTC): (1899 – 1949)
- ÉDOSZ SE: (1950 – 1956)
- Budapesti Kinizsi (Bp. Kinizsi): (1951 – 1956)
- Ferencvárosi TC: (1957–1988/89)
- FTC-Törley: (1989/90 – 1992/93) - the first naming sponsor of FTC
- Ferencvárosi TC: (1993/94)
- FTC-Vitasport: (1994/95 – 1995/96)
- FTC-Vitalin: (1996/97 – 1998/99)
- FTC-Thomas Jeans: (1999/00)
- FTC-Mirato: (2000/01)
- FTC-VMAX: (2001/02 – 2002/03)
- Jégcsillag-FTC: (2003/04)
- Betonút-FTC: (2004/05 – 2005/06)
- FTC-Aprilia: (2006/07 – 2008/09)
- FTC-Fisher Klíma: (2008/09 – 2011/12)
- Széchenyi Bank-FTC: (2012/13 – 2013/14)
- Ferencvárosi TC: (2014/15)
- FTC-PQS Waterpolo: (2015/16 – 2019/20)
- FTC-Telekom (2020/21 – ... )

== Honours ==
=== Domestic competitions ===
- Országos Bajnokság I (National Championship of Hungary)

Champions (26): 1910, 1911, 1912, 1913, 1918, 1919, 1920, 1921, 1922, 1925, 1926, 1927, 1944, 1956, 1962, 1963, 1965, 1968, 1987–88, 1989–90, 1999–00, 2017–18, 2018–19, 2021–22, 2022–23, 2023–24
Runners-up (13): 1909, 1923, 1924, 1928, 1949, 1955, 1960, 1961, 1964, 1966, 1969, 1974, 1998–99
Third place (21): 1941, 1943, 1945, 1947, 1951*, 1957, 1967, 1970, 1971, 1972, 1973, 1975, 1977, 1978, 1979, 1984, 1988–89, 1994–95, 1996–97, 1997–98, 2020–21

- Magyar Kupa (National Cup of Hungary)

Winners (23): 1923, 1924, 1926, 1949, 1957, 1962, 1964, 1965, 1967, 1969, 1973, 1976, 1977, 1978, 1988–89, 1989–90, 1996, 2018, 2019, 2020, 2021, 2022, 2023
Finalist (15): 1925, 1927, 1942, 1943, 1944, 1946, 1951, 1963, 1971, 1972, 1979, 1990–91, 1997, 1998–99, 2001–02

=== European competitions ===
- LEN Champions League

Winners (3): 2018–19, 2023–24, 2024–25
Runners-up (1): 2020–21
Semi-finalist (2): 1988–89, 2021–22

- LEN Euro Cup

Winners (2): 2016–17, 2017–18

- LEN Cup Winners' Cup

Winners (4) – record: 1974–75, 1977–78, 1979–80, 1997–98

- LEN Super Cup

Winners (4): 1978, 1980, 2018, 2019

== Current squad ==
Season 2023-24

№	Nat.	Player	Birth Date	
1	(Hungary)	Dániel Szakonyi	March 1, 1994 (age 32)	Goalkeeper
2	(Serbia)	Dušan Mandić	June 16, 1994 (age 32)	
3	(Hungary)	Zoltán Pohl	March 27, 1995 (age 31)	
5	(Greece)	Stylianos Argyropoulos	August 2, 1996 (age 30)	
6	(Italy)	Edoardo di Somma	September 30, 1996 (age 29)	
7	(Hungary)	Gergő Fekete	June 24, 2000 (age 26)	
8	(Hungary)	Vendel Vigvári	September 10, 2001 (age 25)	
9	(Hungary)	Toni Német	January 14, 1994 (age 32)	
10	(Hungary)	Dénes Varga	March 29, 1987 (age 39)	
11	(Hungary)	Szilárd Jansik	April 6, 1994 (age 32)	
12	(Italy)	Luca Damonte	April 3, 1992 (age 34)	
13	(Hungary)	Ádám Nagy	May 19, 1998 (age 28)	
14	(Hungary)	Soma Vogel	July 7, 1997 (age 29)	Goalkeeper

=== Staff ===
Technical Staff
Section Chairman	(Hungary) Tamás Ambrus (posthumous)
Section leader	(Hungary) Viktor Paján
Technical Manager	(Hungary) Norbert Katona
Head Coach	(Hungary) Balázs Nyéki
Technical Director	(Hungary) György Gerendás

== Recent seasons ==
As of 7 May 2025.

Season	Tier	League	Pos.	Domestic cup	European competitions	
1984–85	1	OB I	7th	Fourth place		
1985–86	1	OB I	6th	Third place		
1986–87	1	OB I	9th	Round of 16		
1987–88	1	OB I	1st	Quarterfinalist		
1988–89	1	OB I	3rd	Champion	1 European Cup	SF
1989–90	1	OB I	1st	Champion	2 Cup Winners' Cup	
1990–91	1	OB I	4th	Runner-up		
1991–92	1	OB I	4th	Semifinalist		
1992–93	1	OB I	6th			
1993–94	1	OB I	4th			
1994–95	1	OB I	3rd			
1995–96	1	OB I	5th			
1996–97	1	OB I	3rd	Champion	3 LEN Cup	SF
1997–98	1	OB I	3rd	Runner-up	2 Cup Winners' Cup	C
1998–99	1	OB I	2nd	Runner-up		
1999–00	1	OB I	1st		2 Cup Winners' Cup	
2000–01	1	OB I	4th		1 Champions League	PR
2001–02	1	OB I	4th	Runner-up	3 LEN Cup	QF
2002–03	1	OB I	4th			
2003–04	1	OB I	4th	did not held	2 LEN Cup	QF
2004–05	1	OB I	5th		1 Euroleague	QR2
2004–05	1	OB I	5th		2 LEN Cup	
2005–06	1	OB I	6th		2 LEN Cup	QF
2006–07	1	OB I	6th			
2007–08	1	OB I	6th	Semifinalist		
2008–09	1	OB I	4th	Quarterfinalist		
2009–10	1	OB I	4th	Preliminary round	2 LEN Cup	QF
2010–11	1	OB I	6th	Semifinalist	2 LEN Cup	QF
2011–12	1	OB I	7th	Quarterfinalist		
2012–13	1	OB I	12th	Quarterfinalist		
2013–14	1	OB I	9th	Preliminary round		
2014–15	1	OB I	4th	Quarterfinalist		
2015–16	1	OB I	4th	Quarterfinalist	2 Euro Cup	QR2
2016–17	1	OB I	4th	Quarterfinalist	2 Euro Cup	C
2017–18	1	OB I	1st	Semifinalist	LEN Super Cup	F
2017–18	1	OB I	1st	Semifinalist	2 Euro Cup	C
2018–19	1	OB I	1st	Champion	LEN Super Cup	C
2018–19	1	OB I	1st	Champion	1 Champions League	C
2019–20	1	OB I	1st^{1}	Champion	LEN Super Cup	C
2019–20	1	OB I	1st^{1}	Champion	1 Champions League	—^{1}
2020–21	1	OB I	3rd	Champion	1 Champions League	F
2021–22	1	OB I	1st	Champion	1 Champions League	3rd
2022–23	1	OB I	1st	Champion	1 Champions League	F
2023–24	1	OB I	1st	Champion	1 Champions League	C
2024–25	1	OB I	1st	Champion	Super Cup	C
2024–25	1	OB I	1st	Champion	1 Champions League	C

^1 Cancelled due to the COVID-19 pandemic in Hungary.

=== In European competition ===
- Participations in Champions League (Champions Cup, Euroleague): 10x
- Participations in Euro Cup (LEN Cup): 11x
- Participations in Cup Winners' Cup: 5x

Season	Competition	Round	Club	Home	Away	Aggregate
1965-66	Champions Cup	Quarter-final round	(Italy) Pro Recco	1-1		3rd place
1965-66	Champions Cup	Quarter-final round	(Soviet Union) CSKA Moscow	3-4		3rd place
1965-66	Champions Cup	Quarter-final round	(Spain) Barcelona	7-1		3rd place
1968-69	Champions Cup	Quarter-final round	(Socialist Federal Republic of Yugoslavia) HAVK Mladost	7-8		3rd place
1968-69	Champions Cup	Quarter-final round	(Socialist Federal Republic of Yugoslavia) Partizan	2-11		3rd place
1968-69	Champions Cup	Quarter-final round	(France) Marseille	6-1		3rd place
1974-75	Cup Winners' Cup; Champion	Finals	(Netherlands) Zian			
1977-78	Cup Winners' Cup; Champion	Finals	(Socialist Federal Republic of Yugoslavia) Primorac Kotor			
1978-79	Cup Winners' Cup; Finalist	Finals	(Socialist Federal Republic of Yugoslavia) Korčula			
1979-80	Cup Winners' Cup; Champion	Finals	(Socialist Federal Republic of Yugoslavia) POŠK			
1988-89	Champions Cup	Quarter-finals	(Italy) Posillipo	14-13	9-7	23–20
1988-89	Champions Cup	Semi-finals	(Spain) Catalunya	6-5	7-9	13–14
1996-97	LEN Cup; Finalist	Finals	(Hungary) Újpest	11-12 (aet)	8-10	19–22
1997-98	Cup Winners' Cup; Champion	Finals	(Greece) Olympiacos			
2000-01	Champions League	Preliminary round Red Group	(Federal Republic of Yugoslavia) Bečej	4-10	6-11	3rd place
2000-01	Champions League	Preliminary round Red Group	(Greece) Olympiacos	7-9	8-6	3rd place
2000-01	Champions League	Preliminary round Red Group	(France) Olympic Nice	6-4	9-11	3rd place
2001-02	LEN Cup	Quarter-finals	(Federal Republic of Yugoslavia) Partizan	3-8	4-5	7–13
2003-04	LEN Cup	Round of 16	(Hungary) Szeged	7-10	10-6	17–16
2003-04	LEN Cup	Quarter-finals	(Greece) Vouliagmeni	7-5	5-8	12–13
2004-05	Euroleague	elimination in Second qualifying round				
2004-05	LEN Cup					
2005-06	LEN Cup	Round of 16	(Germany) ASC Duisburg	10-7	12-14	22–21
2005-06	LEN Cup	Quarter-finals	(Greece) Panionios	8-4	8-10	16–14
2005-06	LEN Cup	Semi-finals	(Russia) Sintez Kazan	9-10	6-12	15–22
2009-10	LEN Cup	Round of 16	(Hungary) Szeged	10-9	7-7	17–16
2009-10	LEN Cup	Quarter-finals	(Italy) Savona	7-8	8-10	15–18
2010-11	LEN Cup	Round of 16	(Montenegro) Akademija Cattaro	11-5	4-6	15–11
2010-11	LEN Cup	Quarter-finals	(Italy) Savona	5-10	5-10	10–20
2015-16	Euro Cup	elimination in Second qualifying round				
2016-17	Euro Cup; Champion	Quarter-finals	(Croatia) Primorje Rijeka	12-8	13-9	25–17
2016-17	Euro Cup; Champion	Semi-finals	(Montenegro) Jadran Herceg Novi	6-4	11-12	17–16
2016-17	Euro Cup; Champion	Finals	(Romania) CSM Oradea	12-6	7-7	19–13
2017-18	Euro Cup; Champion	Quarter-finals	(Russia) Sintez Kazan	12-9	16-8	28–17
2017-18	Euro Cup; Champion	Semi-finals	(Hungary) Miskolc	13-9	13-8	26–17
2017-18	Euro Cup; Champion	Finals	(Italy) Sport Management	9-8	8-5	17–13
2018-19	Champions League; Champion	Preliminary round (Group A)	(Italy) Pro Recco	7-13	6-9	4th place
2018-19	Champions League; Champion	Preliminary round (Group A)	(Spain) Barceloneta	8-9	5-8	4th place
2018-19	Champions League; Champion	Preliminary round (Group A)	(Hungary) Eger	16-9	12-9	4th place
2018-19	Champions League; Champion	Preliminary round (Group A)	(Russia) Dynamo Moscow	13-6	13-11	4th place
2018-19	Champions League; Champion	Preliminary round (Group A)	(Romania) Steaua București	12-4	9-6	4th place
2018-19	Champions League; Champion	Preliminary round (Group A)	(Serbia) Crvena zvezda	17-9	15-6	4th place
2018-19	Champions League; Champion	Preliminary round (Group A)	(Italy) Brescia	8-8	5-10	4th place
2018-19	Champions League; Champion	Quarter-final (F8)	(Croatia) Jug Dubrovnik	10–9		
2018-19	Champions League; Champion	Semi-final (F8)	(Spain) Barceloneta	9–7		
2018-19	Champions League; Champion	Final (F8)	(Greece) Olympiacos	10–10 (4-3 p)		
2019-20	Champions League	Preliminary round (Group B)	(Croatia) HAVK Mladost	14-5	9-6	Cancelled
2019-20	Champions League	Preliminary round (Group B)	(Italy) Pro Recco	(canc.)	13-13	Cancelled
2019-20	Champions League	Preliminary round (Group B)	(Spain) Terrassa	17-11	(canc.)	Cancelled
2019-20	Champions League	Preliminary round (Group B)	(Hungary) Orvosegyetem SC	8-11	10-10	Cancelled
2019-20	Champions League	Preliminary round (Group B)	(Germany) Waspo Hannover	15-12	(canc.)	Cancelled
2019-20	Champions League	Preliminary round (Group B)	(France) Marseille	13-7	(canc.)	Cancelled
2019-20	Champions League	Preliminary round (Group B)	(Georgia (country)) Dinamo Tbilisi	(canc.)	15-10	Cancelled
2020-21	Champions League; Finalist	Preliminary round (Group B)	(Spain) Barceloneta	11-10	8-7	1st place
2020-21	Champions League; Finalist	Preliminary round (Group B)	(Italy) Brescia	7-10	6-9	1st place
2020-21	Champions League; Finalist	Preliminary round (Group B)	(Germany) Waspo Hannover	13-9	19-6	1st place
2020-21	Champions League; Finalist	Preliminary round (Group B)	(Georgia (country)) Dinamo Tbilisi	15-11	11-4	1st place
2020-21	Champions League; Finalist	Preliminary round (Group B)	(Montenegro) Jadran Herceg Novi	12-5	11-2	1st place
2020-21	Champions League; Finalist	Quarter-final (F8)	(France) Marseille	14–6		
2020-21	Champions League; Finalist	Semi-final (F8)	(Italy) Brescia	14–12		
2020-21	Champions League; Finalist	Final (F8)	(Italy) Pro Recco	6–9		
2021-22	Champions League; Third place	Preliminary round (Group A)	(Italy) Brescia		8-8	2nd place
2021-22	Champions League; Third place	Preliminary round (Group A)	(Serbia) Novi Beograd	11-10		2nd place
2021-22	Champions League; Third place	Preliminary round (Group A)	(Greece) Olympiacos	9-9		2nd place
2021-22	Champions League; Third place	Preliminary round (Group A)	(Spain) Barceloneta	7-17	12-12	2nd place
2021-22	Champions League; Third place	Preliminary round (Group A)	(Croatia) Jadran Split	14-8	7-9	2nd place
2021-22	Champions League; Third place	Preliminary round (Group A)	(Serbia) Radnički Kragujevac		11-11	2nd place
2021-22	Champions League; Third place	Preliminary round (Group A)	(Georgia (country)) Dinamo Tbilisi	16-10	14-7	2nd place
2021-22	Champions League; Third place	Quarter-final (F8)	(Croatia) Jug AO Dubrovnik	14–13		
2021-22	Champions League; Third place	Semi-final (F8)	(Italy) Pro Recco	7–10		
2021-22	Champions League; Third place	Third place (F8)	(Italy) AN Brescia	14–12		
2022-23	Champions League	Preliminary round (Group B)	(Italy) Brescia	10-6	4-8	3rd place
2022-23	Champions League	Preliminary round (Group B)	(Serbia) Novi Beograd	14-12	13-14	3rd place
2022-23	Champions League	Preliminary round (Group B)	(Croatia) Jug AO Dubrovnik	9-7	12-12	3rd place
2022-23	Champions League	Preliminary round (Group B)	(Spain) Astrapool Sabadell	10-12	10-7	3rd place
2022-23	Champions League	Preliminary round (Group B)	(Hungary) Genesys OSC-Budapest	12-11	16-12	3rd place
2022-23	Champions League	Preliminary round (Group B)	(France) CN Marseille	9-8	7-13	3rd place
2022-23	Champions League	Preliminary round (Group B)	(Germany) Spandau 04 Berlin	12-8	10-11	3rd place
2022-23	Champions League	Quarter-final (F8)	(Italy) Pro Recco	4–8		
2022-23	Champions League	5th–8th place semifinals	(Italy) AN Brescia	9–8		
2022-23	Champions League	Fifth place	(Greece) Olympiacos	4–9		
2023-24	Champions League; Champion	Main round (Group C)	(Croatia) Jadran Split	13-11	20-17	1st place
2023-24	Champions League; Champion	Main round (Group C)	(Serbia) Crvena zvezda	20-6	16-6	1st place
2023-24	Champions League; Champion	Main round (Group C)	(Montenegro) Jadran Herceg Novi	9-7	17-10	1st place
2023-24	Champions League; Champion	Quarter-finals round (Group B)	(Greece) Olympiacos Piraeus	11-9	8-10	1st place
2023-24	Champions League; Champion	Quarter-finals round (Group B)	(Spain) Zodiac Atlètic-Barceloneta	13-11	10-8	1st place
2023-24	Champions League; Champion	Quarter-finals round (Group B)	(Italy) AN Brescia	9-8	11-9	1st place
2023-24	Champions League; Champion	Semi-final (F4)	(Serbia) Novi Beograd	18–17 (5-4 p)		
2023-24	Champions League; Champion	Final (F4)	(Italy) Pro Recco	12–11		
2024–25	Champions League; Champion	Main round (Group B)	(Croatia) Jadran Split	18-9	12-10	1st place
2024–25	Champions League; Champion	Main round (Group B)	(Serbia) Radnički Kragujevac	16-4	12-5	1st place
2024–25	Champions League; Champion	Main round (Group B)	(Georgia (country)) Dinamo Tbilisi	16-7	18-7	1st place
2024–25	Champions League; Champion	Quarter-finals round (Group B)	(Spain) Zodiac Atlètic-Barceloneta	18-10	12-13 (3-4 p)	1st place
2024–25	Champions League; Champion	Quarter-finals round (Group B)	(Italy) RN Savona	15-11	17-9	1st place
2024–25	Champions League; Champion	Quarter-finals round (Group B)	(Romania) CSM Oradea	20-10	18-7	1st place
2024–25	Champions League; Champion	Semi-final (F4)	(France) CN Marseille	14–11		
2024–25	Champions League; Champion	Final (F4)	(Serbia) Novi Beograd	13–11		

== Notable former players ==
=== Olympic champions ===
- György Kárpáti – 24 years (1945-1969) 1952 Helsinki, 1956 Melbourne, 1964 Tokyo
- László Felkai – 19 years (1950-1969) 1964 Tokyo
- György Gerendás – 18 years (1959-1977) 1976 Montreal
- István Molnár – 12 years (1932-1944) 1936 Berlin
- Miklós Ambrus – 12 years (1953-1956, 1959-1968) 1964 Tokyo
- Norbert Hosnyánszky – 9 years (1994-2003) 2008 Beijing
- Alajos Keserű – 8 years (1920-1928) 1932 Los Angeles
- József Vértesy – 8 years (1920-1928) 1932 Los Angeles
- Bulcsú Székely – 8 years (1996-2001, 2002-2004, 2011–2012) 2000 Sydney
- Dr. István Szívós – 7 years (1960-1967) 1976 Montreal
- Barnabás Steinmetz – 7 years (1993-1995, 1996-2000, 2009–2010) 2000 Sydney, 2004 Athens
- Dezső Gyarmati – 6 years (1960-1966) 1952 Helsinki, 1956 Melbourne, 1964 Tokyo
- Károly Szittya – 5 years (1949-1954) 1952 Helsinki
- Antal Bolvári – 5 years (1964-1969) 1952 Helsinki, 1956 Melbourne
- János Németh – 4 years (1941-1945) 1932 Los Angeles
- Dezső Fábián – 4 years (1948-1952) 1952 Helsinki
- Ádám Steinmetz – 4 years (1996-2000) 2004 Sydney
- Zoltán Kósz – 3 years (1998-2001) 2000 Sydney
- (Serbia) Stefan Mitrović – 3 years (2016–2019) 2016 Rio de Janeiro
- László Jeney – 2 years (1956-1958) 1952 Helsinki, 1956 Melbourne
- Rajmund Fodor – 2 years (1996-1997, 1998-1999) 2000 Sydney, 2004 Athens
- Zsolt Varga – 2 years (2010-2012) 2000 Sydney
- Norbert Madaras – 2 years (2016–2018) 2004 Athens, 2008 Beijing
- Dániel Varga – 2 years (2016–2018) 2008 Beijing
- (Serbia) Slobodan Nikić – 2 years (2017–2019) 2016 Rio de Janeiro
- (Serbia) Nikola Jakšić – 2 years (2017–____) 2016 Rio de Janeiro
- Dénes Varga – 2 years (2017–____) 2008 Beijing
- Tamás Kásás – 1 year (1994-1995) 2000 Sydney, 2004 Athens, 2008 Beijing
- Gergely Kiss – 1 year (1996-1997) 2000 Sydney, 2004 Athens, 2008 Beijing
- Zoltán Szécsi – 1 year (2005-2006) 2000 Sydney, 2004 Athens, 2008 Beijing
- (Serbia) Branislav Mitrović – 1 year (2010-2011) 2016 Rio de Janeiro
- Tamás Varga – 1 year (2010-2011) 2004 Athens, 2008 Beijing
- (Serbia) Gojko Pijetlović – 1 year (2012-2013) 2016 Rio de Janeiro
- Kálmán Markovits – junior years 1952 Helsinki, 1956 Melbourne

== Former coaches ==
- (Hungary) Dezső Fábián (1960–66)
- (Hungary) Dezső Gyarmati (1967–69)
- (Hungary) Mihály Mayer (1975–80)
- (Hungary) László Felkai (1981–82)
- (Hungary) István Szívós (1983–90)
- (Hungary) Mihály Mayer (1990–92) 2x
- (Hungary) Zoltán Kásás (1992–94)
- (Hungary) Péter Wolf (1994–95)
- (Hungary) Zoltán Kásás (1995) 2x
- (Hungary) Gábor Godova
- (Hungary) Lajos Vad ( –2001)
- (Hungary) András Gyöngyösi (2001–03)
- (Hungary) Gábor Csapó (2003–04)
- (Hungary) Attila Bíró
- (Hungary) József Somossy (2006–09)
- (Hungary) Gábor Godova (2009–10) 2x
- (Hungary) Tamás Ambrus (2010–13)
- (Hungary) Zsolt Varga (2013– present)
