= Vasas SC (men's water polo) =

Water polo club in Budapest, Hungary

A-Híd VasasPlaket
- Full name: Vasas Sport Club
- Short name: Vasas
- Founded: 1945; 81 years ago (parent club in 1911)
- League: Országos Bajnokság I
- Based in: Budapest, Hungary
- Arena: Komjádi Béla Sportuszoda
- Colors: Red and blue
- President: László Markovits
- Head coach: Slobodan Nikić
- Championships: 2 European Cup; 3 Cup Winners' Cup; 1 LEN Super Cup; 18 Hungarian Championships; 15 Hungarian Cups; 2 Hungarian Super Cups
- 2021–22: Országos Bajnokság I, 3rd of 14
- Website: vasassc.hu

The Vasas SC water polo team is a department of the Budapest-based sports association Vasas SC. One of the most successful teams in the country, they have won the Hungarian Championship 17 times and the Hungarian Cup 15 times. The club also had major successes on continental level as they won the LEN Euroleague (formerly European Champions Cup), Europe's premier water polo competition two times and took the LEN Cup Winners' Cup title on three occasions as well.

Starting from the 2010–11 season, the club is officially known as TEVA-Vasas-UNIQA due to sponsorship reasons.

== Naming history ==
- Vasas Sport Club (Vasas SC): (1945 – 1949)
- Budapesti Vasas (Bp. Vasas): (1950 – 1956)
- Vasas SC: (1957 – 1990/91)
- Vasas SC-Plaket: (1991/92 – 2001/02) - the first naming sponsor of Vasas
- Vasas-Plaket-Euroleasing: (2002/03 – 2003/04)
- TEVA-VasasPlaket: (2004/05 – 2009/10)
- TEVA-Vasas-UNIQA: (2010/11 – 2011/12)
- TEVA-Vasas: (2012/13)
- LACTIV-VasasPlaket: (2013/14)
- VasasPlaket: (2014/15 – 2019/20)
- A-Híd VasasPlaket: (2020/21 – ... )

== Honours ==
=== Domestic competitions ===
- Országos Bajnokság I (National Championship of Hungary)

Champions (18): 1947, 1949, 1953, 1975, 1976, 1977, 1979, 1980, 1981, 1982, 1983, 1984, 1988–89, 2006–07, 2007–08, 2008–09, 2009–10, 2011–12
Runners-up (18): 1945, 1950, 1951, 1952, 1984–85, 1989–90, 1991–92, 1993–94, 1994–95, 1995–96, 1996–97, 1997–98, 2001–02, 2002–03, 2003–04, 2004–05, 2005–06, 2010–11
Third place (6): 1946, 1956, 1974, 1985–86, 1992–93, 2000–01

- Magyar Kupa (National Cup of Hungary)

Winners (15): 1947, 1961, 1971, 1981, 1983, 1984, 1991–92, 1993–94, 1995–96, 1997, 2000–01, 2001–02, 2004, 2005, 2009
Finalist (9): 1975, 1985, 1992–93, 1994–95, 1996, 1999–00, 2002–03, 2006, 2008

- Szuperkupa (Super Cup of Hungary); Championship vs. Cup winner

Winners (): 2001, 2006

=== European competitions ===
- LEN Champions League (Champions Cup)

Winners (2): 1979–80, 1984–85

- LEN Euro Cup

Winners (1): 2022–23

- LEN Cup Winners' Cup

Winners (3): 1985–86, 1994–95, 2001–02

- LEN Super Cup

Winners (1): 1985

== Current squad ==
Season 2022–23

№	Player	Birth Date	Position	L/R
1	(Serbia) (Hungary) Branislav Mitrović	January 30, 1985 (age 41)	Goalkeeper	
2	(Montenegro) Draško Brguljan	December 27, 1984 (age 41)	Guard / Wing	
3	(Hungary) Lóránd Zerinváry	August 17, 1998 (age 27)		
4	(Serbia) Sava Ranđelović	July 17, 1993 (age 32)	Guard	R
5	(Hungary) Ákos Konarik	March 29, 2001 (age 25)		
6	(Hungary) Tamás Mezei	September 24, 1990 (age 35)	Centre Forward	L
7	(Hungary) Domonkos Sélley-Rauscher	June 17, 1997 (age 29)	Wing / Centre Back	
8	(Russia) Ivan Nagaev	November 30, 1993 (age 32)		L
9	(Hungary) Balázs Erdélyi	February 16, 1990 (age 36)	Wing	
10	(Hungary) Bence Bátori (c)	December 28, 1991 (age 34)	Wing	R
11	(Hungary) Krisztián Bedő	May 4, 1993 (age 33)	Centre Forward	R
12	(Hungary) Tamás Sedlmayer	January 6, 1995 (age 31)		
13	(Hungary) Roland Simon	September 1, 1992 (age 33)		
14	(Hungary) Márton Mizsei	November 1, 1999 (age 26)	Goalkeeper	
	(Hungary) Lőrinc Gábor	January 25, 2002 (age 24)	Centre Forward	
	(Hungary) Gergő Herczeg	July 6, 2004 (age 21)		

=== Staff ===
Technical staff

- Head Coach: (Serbia) Slobodan Nikić
- Assistant and Goalkeeping Coach: (Hungary) Csaba Mátéfalvy
- Club Doctor: (Hungary) Dr. Attila Szűcs
- Masseur: (Hungary) Ákos Horváth
- Fitness Coach: (Hungary) Marcell Fridvalszki
- Video Analyst: (Hungary) Balázs Búza
- Team Manager: (Hungary) Szabolcs Tóth

Management

- Department Leader: (Hungary) Zoltán Apáthy

=== Transfers ===
Transfers for the 2022–23 season

Joining

- (Hungary) Ákos Konarik from (Hungary) Szolnok
- (Russia) Ivan Nagaev from (Germany) Waspo Hannover
- (Hungary) Domonkos Sélley-Rauscher from (Hungary) Miskolc
- (Hungary) Lőrinc Gábor from (Hungary) Ferencváros

Leaving

- (Hungary) Kristóf Szatmári to (Hungary) Kaposvár
- (Hungary) Viktor Vadovics to (Hungary) Ferencváros
- (Hungary) Bence Magyar to (Hungary) Cegléd
- (Hungary) Balázs Sipos to

== Recent seasons ==
As of 5 January 2023.

Season	Tier	League	Pos.	Domestic cup	European competitions	
1984–85	1	OB I	2nd	Champion	1 European Cup	C
1985–86	1	OB I	3rd	Runner-up	LEN Super Cup	C
1985–86	1	OB I	3rd	Runner-up	2 Cup Winners' Cup	C
1986–87	1	OB I	6th	Round of 16	LEN Super Cup	F
1987–88	1	OB I	5th	Third place		
1988–89	1	OB I	1st	Quarterfinalist		
1989–90	1	OB I	2nd	Quarterfinalist	1 European Cup	SF
1990–91	1	OB I	5th	Round of 16		
1991–92	1	OB I	2nd	Champion		
1992–93	1	OB I	3rd	Runner-up	2 Cup Winners' Cup	
1993–94	1	OB I	2nd	Champion		
1994–95	1	OB I	2nd	Runner-up	2 Cup Winners' Cup	C
1995–96	1	OB I	2nd	Champion	LEN Super Cup	F
1996–97	1	OB I	2nd	Runner-up	2 Cup Winners' Cup	
1997–98	1	OB I	2nd	Champion	3 LEN Cup	SF
1998–99	1	OB I	4th		2 Cup Winners' Cup	
1999–00	1	OB I	4th	Runner-up	3 LEN Cup	SF
2000–01	1	OB I	3rd	Champion	3 LEN Cup	SF
2001–02	1	OB I	2nd	Champion	2 Cup Winners' Cup	C
2002–03	1	OB I	2nd	Runner-up	2 Cup Winners' Cup	F
2003–04	1	OB I	2nd	did not held	1 Euroleague	QF
2004–05	1	OB I	2nd	Champion	1 Euroleague	QF
2005–06	1	OB I	2nd	Champion	1 Euroleague	QF
2006–07	1	OB I	1st	Runner-up	1 Euroleague	QF
2007–08	1	OB I	1st	Quarterfinalist	1 Euroleague	3rd
2008–09	1	OB I	1st	Runner-up	1 Euroleague	QF
2009–10	1	OB I	1st	Champion	1 Euroleague	PR
2010–11	1	OB I	2nd	Quarterfinalist	1 Euroleague	MR
2011–12	1	OB I	1st	Quarterfinalist	1 Champions League	4th
2012–13	1	OB I	4th	Semifinalist		
2013–14	1	OB I	5th	Semifinalist		
2014–15	1	OB I	8th	Quarterfinalist		
2015–16	1	OB I	7th	Preliminary round		
2016–17	1	OB I	8th	Preliminary round		
2017–18	1	OB I	12th	Quarterfinalist		
2018–19	1	OB I	15th	Preliminary round		
2019–20	1	OB I	11th^{1}	Preliminary round		
2020–21	1	OB I	5th	Third place		
2021–22	1	OB I	3rd	Semifinalist	2 Euro Cup	QR2
2022–23	1	OB I		Semifinalist	1 Champions League	QR3
2022–23	1	OB I		Semifinalist	2 Euro Cup	

^1 Cancelled due to the COVID-19 pandemic in Hungary.

=== In European competition ===
- Participations in Champions League (Champions Cup, Euroleague): 19x
- Participations in Euro Cup (LEN Cup): 3x
- Participations in Cup Winners' Cup: 7x

Season	Competition	Round	Club	Home	Away	Aggregate
1975-76	European Cup; Finalist	Semi-final round	(Socialist Federal Republic of Yugoslavia) Partizan	7-7		2nd place
1975-76	European Cup; Finalist	Semi-final round	(Czechoslovakia) Košice	9-2		2nd place
1975-76	European Cup; Finalist	Semi-final round	(Turkey) Galatasaray	14-4		2nd place
1975-76	European Cup; Finalist	Final round	(Italy) Canottieri Napoli	11-10		2nd place
1975-76	European Cup; Finalist	Final round	(Socialist Federal Republic of Yugoslavia) Partizan	5–6		2nd place
1975-76	European Cup; Finalist	Final round	(Netherlands) De Robben	10-6		2nd place
1976-77	European Cup	Semi-final round	(Soviet Union) CSKA Moscow	5-7		3rd place
1976-77	European Cup	Semi-final round	(Socialist Federal Republic of Yugoslavia) Partizan	7-6		3rd place
1976-77	European Cup	Semi-final round	(Italy) Florentia	5-5		3rd place
1977-78	European Cup	Semi-final round	(Soviet Union) CSKA Moscow	5-5		3rd place
1977-78	European Cup	Semi-final round	(Italy) Canottieri Napoli	4-5		3rd place
1977-78	European Cup	Semi-final round	(Netherlands) Alphen	8-3		3rd place
1979-80	European Cup; Champion	Semi-final round	(Spain) Montjuïc	10-5		1st place
1979-80	European Cup; Champion	Semi-final round	(Czechoslovakia) Košice	5-4		1st place
1979-80	European Cup; Champion	Semi-final round	(Greece) Ethnikos	7-4		1st place
1979-80	European Cup; Champion	Final round	(West Germany) Spandau 04	4-4		1st place
1979-80	European Cup; Champion	Final round	(Spain) Montjuïc	8-6		1st place
1979-80	European Cup; Champion	Final round	(Socialist Federal Republic of Yugoslavia) Partizan	9-7		1st place
1980-81	European Cup; Third place	Semi-final round	(Socialist Federal Republic of Yugoslavia) Jug Dubrovnik	6-7		2nd place
1980-81	European Cup; Third place	Semi-final round	(Spain) Barcelona	7-5		2nd place
1980-81	European Cup; Third place	Semi-final round	(France) Marseille	7-2		2nd place
1980-81	European Cup; Third place	Final round	(Socialist Federal Republic of Yugoslavia) Jug Dubrovnik	2-8		3rd place
1980-81	European Cup; Third place	Final round	(West Germany) Spandau 04	8-2		3rd place
1980-81	European Cup; Third place	Final round	(Greece) Ethnikos	4-4		3rd place
1981-82	European Cup; Third place	Semi-final round	(Netherlands) Alphen	10-10		1st place
1981-82	European Cup; Third place	Semi-final round	(Socialist Federal Republic of Yugoslavia) Jug Dubrovnik	12-6		1st place
1981-82	European Cup; Third place	Semi-final round	(Greece) Ethnikos	11-8		1st place
1981-82	European Cup; Third place	Final round	(West Germany) Spandau 04	11-11		3rd place
1981-82	European Cup; Third place	Final round	(Spain) Barcelona	12-15		3rd place
1981-82	European Cup; Third place	Final round	(Netherlands) Alphen	11-7		3rd place
1982-83	European Cup	Quarter-final round	(Italy) Pro Recco	8-12		2nd place
1982-83	European Cup	Quarter-final round	(Netherlands) De Robben	9-7		2nd place
1982-83	European Cup	Quarter-final round	(France) Marseille	14-11		2nd place
1982-83	European Cup	Semi-finals	(West Germany) Spandau 04	10-11	10-12	20–23
1983-84	European Cup	Quarter-final round	(West Germany) Spandau 04	11-14		3rd place
1983-84	European Cup	Quarter-final round	(Italy) Pro Recco	9-10		3rd place
1983-84	European Cup	Quarter-final round	(Turkey) Istanbul YiK	19-8		3rd place
1984-85	European Cup; Champion	Quarter-final round	(Socialist Federal Republic of Yugoslavia) Partizan	8-12		2nd place
1984-85	European Cup; Champion	Quarter-final round	(Turkey) Istanbul YiK	17-8		2nd place
1984-85	European Cup; Champion	Semi-finals	(West Germany) Spandau 04	10-9	8-8	18–17
1984-85	European Cup; Champion	Finals	(Soviet Union) CSKA Moscow	10-5	11-11	21–16
1985-86	Cup Winners' Cup; Champion	Finals	(Romania) Dinamo București			
1989-90	European Cup	Quarter-finals	(Spain) Catalunya	6-6	6-5	12–11
1989-90	European Cup	Semi-finals	(Socialist Federal Republic of Yugoslavia) HAVK Mladost	7-9	4-10	11–19
1994-95	Cup Winners' Cup; Champion	Finals	(Italy) Pescara			
1997-98	LEN Cup	Semi-finals	(Croatia) Jadran Split			
1999-00	LEN Cup	Quarter-finals	(Hungary) Eger	8-4	7-6	15–10
1999-00	LEN Cup	Semi-finals	(Italy) Pescara		3-9	–
2000-01	LEN Cup	Quarter-finals	(Spain) Barcelona	6-5	7-7	13–12
2000-01	LEN Cup	Semi-finals	(Croatia) HAVK Mladost	7-12	4-11	11–23
2001-02	Cup Winners' Cup; Champion	Quarter-finals	(Germany) Cannstatt	9-7	11-10	20–17
2001-02	Cup Winners' Cup; Champion	Semi-finals	(Greece) Vouliagmeni	10-8	7-7	17–15
2001-02	Cup Winners' Cup; Champion	Finals	(Croatia) HAVK Mladost	6-3	5-7	11–10
2002-03	Cup Winners' Cup; Finalist	Quarter-finals	(Federal Republic of Yugoslavia) Jadran Herceg Novi	5-5	5-4	10–9
2002-03	Cup Winners' Cup; Finalist	Semi-finals	(Spain) Sabadell	9-6	4-6	13–12
2002-03	Cup Winners' Cup; Finalist	Finals	(Italy) Posillipo	10-10	3-4	13–14
2003-04	Euroleague	Preliminary round (Group B)	(Greece) Olympiacos	8-8	8-4	1st place
2003-04	Euroleague	Preliminary round (Group B)	(Spain) Barceloneta	7-6	4-7	1st place
2003-04	Euroleague	Preliminary round (Group B)	(Serbia and Montenegro) Partizan	9-7	8-5	1st place
2003-04	Euroleague	Quarter-finals	(Hungary) Bp. Honvéd	6-7	8-8	14–15
2004-05	Euroleague	Preliminary round (Group A)	(Croatia) Jug Dubrovnik	8-8	10-12	2nd place
2004-05	Euroleague	Preliminary round (Group A)	(France) Olympic Nice	10-9	6-5	2nd place
2004-05	Euroleague	Preliminary round (Group A)	(Serbia and Montenegro) Niš	11-6	7-6	2nd place
2004-05	Euroleague	Quarter-finals	(Italy) Pro Recco	6-10	8-9	14–19
2005-06	Euroleague	Preliminary round (Group B)	(Croatia) Jug Dubrovnik	10-6	9-13	2nd place
2005-06	Euroleague	Preliminary round (Group B)	(France) Marseille	12-10	9-13	2nd place
2005-06	Euroleague	Preliminary round (Group B)	(Greece) Olympiacos	9-9	8-7	2nd place
2005-06	Euroleague	Quarter-finals	(Italy) Savona	6-5	16-18	22–23
2006-07	Euroleague	Preliminary round (Group C)	(Italy) Pro Recco	8-9	10-11	2nd place
2006-07	Euroleague	Preliminary round (Group C)	(Russia) Šturm 2002	13-9	11-10	2nd place
2006-07	Euroleague	Preliminary round (Group C)	(Hungary) Eger	12-6	7-8	2nd place
2006-07	Euroleague	Quarter-finals	(Croatia) Jug Dubrovnik	11-10	7-9	18–19
2007-08	Euroleague; Third place	Preliminary round (Group C)	(Croatia) Jug Dubrovnik	11-8	7-8	1st place
2007-08	Euroleague; Third place	Preliminary round (Group C)	(Hungary) Bp. Honvéd	8-8	6-5	1st place
2007-08	Euroleague; Third place	Preliminary round (Group C)	(Greece) Panionios	13-8	10-8	1st place
2007-08	Euroleague; Third place	Quarter-finals	(Montenegro) Primorac Kotor	6-7	8-6	14–13
2007-08	Euroleague; Third place	Semi-final (F4)	(Croatia) Jug Dubrovnik	6–11		
2007-08	Euroleague; Third place	Bronze match (F4)	(Croatia) HAVK Mladost	8–6		
2008-09	Euroleague	Preliminary round (Group D)	(Serbia) Partizan	7-8	7-9	2nd place
2008-09	Euroleague	Preliminary round (Group D)	(Hungary) Eger	11-10	9-7	2nd place
2008-09	Euroleague	Preliminary round (Group D)	(France) Marseille	16-6	10-6	2nd place
2008-09	Euroleague	Quarter-finals	(Italy) Pro Recco	8-11	10-9	18–20
2009-10	Euroleague	Preliminary round (Group B)	(Croatia) Jug Dubrovnik	11-8	11-11	3rd place
2009-10	Euroleague	Preliminary round (Group B)	(Greece) Panionios	14-7	10-11	3rd place
2009-10	Euroleague	Preliminary round (Group B)	(Montenegro) Primorac Kotor	5-8	7-9	3rd place
2010-11	Euroleague	Preliminary round (Group A)	(Montenegro) Jadran Herceg Novi	8-12	10-11	2nd place
2010-11	Euroleague	Preliminary round (Group A)	(Montenegro) Primorac Kotor	7-6	9-8	2nd place
2010-11	Euroleague	Preliminary round (Group A)	(Hungary) Szeged	11-10	9-9	2nd place
2010-11	Euroleague	Main round (Group B)	(Italy) Pro Recco	7-9	6-12	4th place
2010-11	Euroleague	Main round (Group B)	(Croatia) HAVK Mladost	8-9	7-8	4th place
2010-11	Euroleague	Main round (Group B)	(Croatia) Primorje Rijeka	12-12	6-13	4th place
2011-12	Champions League; Fourth place	Preliminary round (Group C)	(Serbia) Partizan	10-10	5-9	2nd place
2011-12	Champions League; Fourth place	Preliminary round (Group C)	(Hungary) Eger	13-9	8-5	2nd place
2011-12	Champions League; Fourth place	Preliminary round (Group C)	(Hungary) Szeged	12-9	12-12	2nd place
2011-12	Champions League; Fourth place	Quarter-finals	(Croatia) Jug Dubrovnik	16-9	8-12	24–21
2011-12	Champions League; Fourth place	Semi Final (F4)	(Italy) Pro Recco	5–12		
2011-12	Champions League; Fourth place	Bronze match (F4)	(Croatia) HAVK Mladost	7–11		
2021-22	Euro Cup	elimination in Second qualifying round				
2022-23	Champions League	elimination in Third qualifying round				
2022-23	Euro Cup	Round of 16	(Serbia) Crvena zvezda	15-10	11-7	18–17
2022-23	Euro Cup	Quarter-finals	(Serbia) Šabac	-	-	–

== Notable former players ==
=== Olympic champions ===
- (Hungary) Jenő Brandi (1945–1949)
- (Hungary) Antal Bolvári (1962–1963)
- (Hungary) Mihály Bozsi (1948)
- (Hungary) Gábor Csapó (1973–1984)
- (Hungary) Tamás Faragó (1969–1984)
- (Hungary) Norbert Hosnyánszky (2006–2007, 2008–2010)
- (Hungary) László Jeney (1945–1955)
- (Hungary) Tamás Kásás (2003–2004)
- (Hungary) György Kenéz (1974–1985)
- (Hungary) Gábor Kis (2008–2010)
- (Hungary) Gergely Kiss (2010–2012)
- (Hungary) Zoltán Kósz (1976–1997, 2001–2004)
- (Hungary) Norbert Madaras (2001–2004)
- (Hungary) Kálmán Markovits (1950–1962)
- (Hungary) István Molnár (1945–1947)
- (Hungary) Péter Rusorán (1969–1972)
- (Hungary) Ádám Steinmetz (2000–2008, 2011–2018)
- (Hungary) Barnabás Steinmetz (2003–2009, 2010–2012)
- (Hungary) Bulcsú Székely (2001–2002)
- (Hungary) István Szívós (1945–1946, 1949–1956)
- (Hungary) Attila Vári (1994–2002)
- (Hungary) Dániel Varga (2001–2010)
- (Hungary) Dénes Varga (2005–2010)
- (Hungary) Tamás Varga (1994–1996, 2000–2004)
- (Croatia) Miho Bošković (2010–2012)
- (Serbia) (Hungary) Branislav Mitrović (2020–)
- (Serbia) Slobodan Nikić (2019–2020)
- (Serbia) Sava Ranđelović (2020–)

== Former coaches ==
- (Hungary) Mihály Bozsi (1947–1956)
- (Hungary) István Szívós (1957–1959)
- (Hungary) Mihály Bozsi (1962–1965) 2x
- (Hungary) Dezső Gyarmati (1971–1972)
- (Hungary) Péter Rusorán (1973–1976)
- (Hungary) Péter Rusorán (1979–1981) 2x
- (Hungary) Péter Rusorán (1983–1986) 3x
- (Hungary) Dezső Gyarmati (1988) 2x
- (Hungary) György Kenéz (1988–1990)
- (Hungary) Gábor Csapó (1992–1993)
- (Hungary) Tamás Faragó (1995–2000)
- (Hungary) József Somossy (2000–2003)
- (Hungary) Zoltán Kásás (2003–2004)
- (Hungary) László Földi (2004– present)
