= Egri VK =

Tigra-ZF-Eger
- Full name: Egri Vízilabda Klub
- Founded: 24 September 1910; 115 years ago
- League: Országos Bajnokság I
- Based in: Eger, Hungary
- Arena: Bitskey Aladár Uszoda (Capacity: 1,500)
- Colors: Blue and white
- President: Zoltán Szécsi
- Manager: Péter Biros
- Championships: 3 Hungarian Championships; 4 Hungarian Cups
- 2021–22: Országos Bajnokság I, 10th of 14
- Website: egrivizilabda.hu

Egri Vízilabda Klub (English: Water Polo Club of Eger) is a Hungarian water polo club based in Eger. One of the dominant teams in the country since the late 2000s, Eger won the national championship in 2011,2013,2014 and came in second in 2012. They also collected the gold medal in the Hungarian cup in 1972 and 2007. Beside the domestic successes they also finished runners-up in the LEN Cup in 2008.

Starting from summer 2010 the club is known as ZF Eger after its main sponsor ZF Friedrichshafen.

== Naming history ==
- Egri TE: (1910 – 1943)
  - MOVE Egri SE: (1920 – 1945)
- Egri Barátság SE: (1945 – 1947)
- Egri SZTK: (1948 – 1949)
- Egri ÁVESZ: (1950)
- Egri Fáklya SK: (1951 – 1954)
- Egri Bástya SE: (1955 – 1956)
- Eger SE: (1957)
- Egri SC: (1958 – 1959)
- Egri Vasas SK: (1960)
- Egri Dózsa SC: (1961 – 1976)
- Eger SE: (1977 – 1992/93)
- ÚVK-Eger: (1993/94)
- ÚVMK Eger: (1993/94 – 1995/96)
- ÚVMK Eger-Egervin: (1996/97 – 1998/99)
- ÚVMK BauSystem-Eger: (1999/00)
- UPC-Egri VK: (2000/01)
- Egri VK: (2001/02 – 2002/03)
- ZF Hungária Egri VK: (2002/03 – 2003/04)
- Brendon-ZF-Eger: (2004/05)
- Brendon-Fenstherm-ZF-Eger: (2005/06 – 2007/08)
- Brendon-UPC-ZF-Egri VK: (2007/08)
- ZF-Eger: (2008/09 – 2019/20)
- Tigra-ZF-Eger: (2020/21 – ... )

== Honours ==
=== Domestic competitions ===
- Országos Bajnokság I (National Championship of Hungary)

Champions (3): 2010–11, 2012–13, 2013–14
Runners-up (6): 2007–08, 2008–09, 2009–10, 2011–12, 2015–16, 2016–17
Third place (6): 1964, 1969, 2005–06, 2006–07, 2014–15, 2017–18

- Magyar Kupa (National Cup of Hungary)

Winners (4): 1972, 2007, 2008, 2015
Finalist (6): 1970, 2004, 2005, 2009, 2010, 2016

=== European competitions ===
- LEN Champions League

Fourth place (1): 2016–17

- LEN Euro Cup

Runners-up (1): 2007–08

== Current squad ==
Season 2020–21

№	Nat.	Player	Birth Date	Position	L/R
4	(Hungary)	Dominik Kürti	February 10, 1999 (age 27)		
6	(Hungary)	Bálint Lőrincz	March 10, 1994 (age 32)		
7	(Hungary)	Ádám Decker	February 29, 1984 (age 42)	Guard	R
8	(Hungary)	Gergő Kovács	September 2, 1995 (age 30)		
11	(Hungary)	Krisztián Bedő	May 4, 1993 (age 33)	Centre forward	
13	(Hungary)	Barnabás Biros	June 5, 1997 (age 29)		
14	(Hungary)	Boldizsár Csiszár	March 3, 1997 (age 29)	Goalkeeper	
	(Hungary)	Márton Magyar	September 9, 1999 (age 26)		

=== Staff ===
Technical Staff
Chairman	(Hungary) Attila Bárány
Executive Director	(Hungary) dr. Gábor Seress
President of Society	(Germany) dr. Ulrich Diller
Head coach	(Hungary) Norbert Dabrowski
Assistant coach	(Hungary) Márton Petrovai

=== Transfers (2017-18) ===
Source: vizipolo.hu

In:

- (Serbia) (Hungary) Marko Avramović (from Ferencváros)
- (Serbia) Strahinja Rašović (from Barceloneta)
- (Greece) Angelos Vlachopoulos (from Posillipo)

Out:

- (Serbia) Miloš Ćuk (from Szolnoki Dózsa)
- (Hungary) Balázs Erdélyi (to Orvosegyetem)
- (Serbia) Boris Vapenski (to Ortigia)

== Recent seasons ==
As of 6 January 2023.

Season	Tier	League	Pos.	Domestic cup	European competitions	
1984–85	1	OB I	5th	Round of 16		
1985–86	1	OB I	5th	Quarterfinalist		
1986–87	1	OB I	7th	Round of 16		
1987–88	1	OB I	11th	Round of 16		
1988–89	1	OB I	9th	Round of 16		
1989–90	1	OB I	9th	Quarterfinalist		
1990–91	1	OB I	7th	Round of 16		
1991–92	1	OB I	8th	Semifinalist		
1992–93	1	OB I	9th			
1993–94	1	OB I	8th			
1994–95	1	OB I	9th			
1995–96	1	OB I	10th			
1996–97	1	OB I	7th			
1997–98	1	OB I	9th			
1998–99	1	OB I	6th			
1999–00	1	OB I	7th		3 LEN Cup	QF
2000–01	1	OB I	7th	Round of 16		
2001–02	1	OB I	9th	Quarterfinalist		
2002–03	1	OB I	8th	Round of 16		
2003–04	1	OB I	7th	did not held		
2004–05	1	OB I	4th	Runner-up		
2005–06	1	OB I	3rd	Runner-up	2 LEN Cup	QF
2006–07	1	OB I	3rd		1 Euroleague	PR
2007–08	1	OB I	2nd	Champion	1 Euroleague	QR2
2007–08	1	OB I	2nd	Champion	2 LEN Cup	F
2008–09	1	OB I	2nd	Champion	1 Euroleague	PR
2009–10	1	OB I	2nd	Runner-up	1 Euroleague	QF
2010–11	1	OB I	1st	Runner-up	1 Euroleague	PR
2011–12	1	OB I	2nd	Semifinalist	1 Champions League	PR
2012–13	1	OB I	1st	Quarterfinalist	1 Champions League	R16
2013–14	1	OB I	1st	Quarterfinalist	1 Champions League	PR
2014–15	1	OB I	3rd	Semifinalist	1 Champions League	5th
2015–16	1	OB I	2nd	Champion	1 Champions League	6th
2016–17	1	OB I	2nd	Runner-up	1 Champions League	4th
2017–18	1	OB I	3rd	Semifinalist	1 Champions League	6th
2018–19	1	OB I	4th	Quarterfinalist	1 Champions League	PR
2019–20	1	OB I	4th^{1}	Quarterfinalist	2 Euro Cup	SF^{1}
2020–21	1	OB I	8th	Preliminary round		
2021–22	1	OB I	10th	Quarterfinalist		
2022–23	1	OB I	7th	Quarterfinalist		
2023–24	1	OB I		Quarterfinalist		

^1 Cancelled due to the COVID-19 pandemic.

=== In European competition ===
- Participations in Champions League (Champions Cup, Euroleague): 13x
- Participations in Euro Cup (LEN Cup): 3x

Season	Competition	Round	Club	Home	Away	Aggregate
1999-00	LEN Cup	Quarter-finals	(Hungary) Vasas	6-7	4-8	10–15
2005-06	LEN Cup	Round of 16	(Russia) Spartak Volgograd	12-8	8-9	20–17
2005-06	LEN Cup	Quarter-finals	(Italy) Leonessa	10-8	7-10	17–18
2006-07	Euroleague	Preliminary round (Group C)	(Italy) Pro Recco	10-10	5-10	3rd place
2006-07	Euroleague	Preliminary round (Group C)	(Russia) Šturm 2002	14-13	11-11	3rd place
2006-07	Euroleague	Preliminary round (Group C)	(Hungary) Vasas	8-7	6-12	3rd place
2007-08	Euroleague	elimination in Second qualifying round				
2007-08	LEN Cup; Finalist	Round of 16	(Romania) CSM Oradea	14-9	12-14	26–23
2007-08	LEN Cup; Finalist	Quarter-finals	(Hungary) Szeged	5-1	8-11	13–12
2007-08	LEN Cup; Finalist	Semi-finals	(Montenegro) Budva	11-9	9-9	20–18
2007-08	LEN Cup; Finalist	Finals	(Russia) Šturm 2002	6-8	7-12	13–20
2008-09	Euroleague	Preliminary round (Group D)	(Serbia) Partizan	7-7	9-11	3rd place
2008-09	Euroleague	Preliminary round (Group D)	(Hungary) Vasas	7-9	10-11	3rd place
2008-09	Euroleague	Preliminary round (Group D)	(France) Marseille	9-9	9-9	3rd place
2009-10	Euroleague	Preliminary round (Group D)	(Italy) Pro Recco	7-11	8-8	2nd place
2009-10	Euroleague	Preliminary round (Group D)	(Russia) Šturm 2002	10-7	5-5	2nd place
2009-10	Euroleague	Preliminary round (Group D)	(Russia) Sintez Kazan	11-8	6-8	2nd place
2009-10	Euroleague	Quarter-finals	(Serbia) Partizan	4-12	5-10	9–22
2010-11	Euroleague	Preliminary round (Group D)	(Croatia) Jug Dubrovnik	9-10	10-15	4th place
2010-11	Euroleague	Preliminary round (Group D)	(Spain) Barceloneta	8-10	9-10	4th place
2010-11	Euroleague	Preliminary round (Group D)	(Croatia) Primorje Rijeka	6-11	4-7	4th place
2011-12	Champions League	Preliminary round (Group C)	(Serbia) Partizan	12-8	6-9	4th place
2011-12	Champions League	Preliminary round (Group C)	(Hungary) Vasas	5-8	9-13	4th place
2011-12	Champions League	Preliminary round (Group C)	(Hungary) Szeged	9-10	3-6	4th place
2012-13	Champions League	Preliminary round (Group A)	(Netherlands) Schuurman	13-4	17-6	3rd place
2012-13	Champions League	Preliminary round (Group A)	(Greece) Vouliagmeni	10-9	8-11	3rd place
2012-13	Champions League	Preliminary round (Group A)	(Russia) Spartak Volgograd	8-6	7-10	3rd place
2012-13	Champions League	Preliminary round (Group A)	(Germany) Waspo Hannover	16-5	13-4	3rd place
2012-13	Champions League	Preliminary round (Group A)	(Georgia (country)) Ligamus Tbilisi	27-5	12-4	3rd place
2012-13	Champions League	Round of 16	(Serbia) Crvena zvezda	8-8	6-13	14–21
2013-14	Champions League	Preliminary round (Group A)	(Spain) Barceloneta	5-11	5-9	6th place
2013-14	Champions League	Preliminary round (Group A)	(Croatia) Jug Dubrovnik	8-10	11-16	6th place
2013-14	Champions League	Preliminary round (Group A)	(Greece) Olympiacos	12-11	5-13	6th place
2013-14	Champions League	Preliminary round (Group A)	(Croatia) Primorje Rijeka	6-11	7-20	6th place
2013-14	Champions League	Preliminary round (Group A)	(Italy) Pro Recco	7-8	9-14	6th place
2014-15	Champions League; Fifth place	Preliminary round (Group A)	(Spain) Barceloneta	11-6	7-7	2nd place
2014-15	Champions League; Fifth place	Preliminary round (Group A)	(Italy) Brescia	10-5	7-3	2nd place
2014-15	Champions League; Fifth place	Preliminary round (Group A)	(Greece) Olympiacos	10-9	6-8	2nd place
2014-15	Champions League; Fifth place	Preliminary round (Group A)	(Italy) Pro Recco	4-12	9-11	2nd place
2014-15	Champions League; Fifth place	Preliminary round (Group A)	(Serbia) Radnički Kragujevac	7-6	11-12	2nd place
2014-15	Champions League; Fifth place	Quarter-final (F6)	(Croatia) Jug Dubrovnik	8–10		
2014-15	Champions League; Fifth place	5th-6th placement (F6)	(Hungary) Szolnok	8–7		
2015-16	Champions League; Sixth place	Preliminary round (Group A)	(Spain) Barceloneta	6-5	6-6	2nd place
2015-16	Champions League; Sixth place	Preliminary round (Group A)	(Greece) Olympiacos	8-8	7-8	2nd place
2015-16	Champions League; Sixth place	Preliminary round (Group A)	(Germany) Spandau 04	10-7	15-8	2nd place
2015-16	Champions League; Sixth place	Preliminary round (Group A)	(Croatia) Primorje Rijeka	12-12	7-8	2nd place
2015-16	Champions League; Sixth place	Preliminary round (Group A)	(Montenegro) Jadran Herceg Novi	8-7	11-11	2nd place
2015-16	Champions League; Sixth place	Quarter-final (F6)	(Croatia) Jug Dubrovnik	6–8		
2015-16	Champions League; Sixth place	5th-6th placement (F6)	(Spain) Barceloneta	6–10		
2016-17	Champions League; Fourth place	Preliminary round (Group A)	(Croatia) Jug Dubrovnik	6-5	6-10	2nd place
2016-17	Champions League; Fourth place	Preliminary round (Group A)	(Italy) Pro Recco	7-11	4-9	2nd place
2016-17	Champions League; Fourth place	Preliminary round (Group A)	(Spain) Barceloneta	10-9	6-10	2nd place
2016-17	Champions League; Fourth place	Preliminary round (Group A)	(Serbia) Partizan	8-4	9-8	2nd place
2016-17	Champions League; Fourth place	Preliminary round (Group A)	(Germany) Waspo Hannover	10-7	12-11	2nd place
2016-17	Champions League; Fourth place	Quarter-final (F6)	(Italy) Brescia	6–4		
2016-17	Champions League; Fourth place	Semi-final (F6)	(Hungary) Szolnok	5–7		
2016-17	Champions League; Fourth place	Bronze match (F6)	(Italy) Pro Recco	6–15		
2017-18	Champions League; Sixth place	Preliminary round (Group B)	(Romania) Steaua București	12-9	8-3	2nd place
2017-18	Champions League; Sixth place	Preliminary round (Group B)	(Spain) Sabadell	14-5	15-7	2nd place
2017-18	Champions League; Sixth place	Preliminary round (Group B)	(Montenegro) Jadran Herceg Novi	8-4	4-4	2nd place
2017-18	Champions League; Sixth place	Preliminary round (Group B)	(Netherlands) Alphen	15-4	14-4	2nd place
2017-18	Champions League; Sixth place	Preliminary round (Group B)	(Italy) Pro Recco	4-6	6-14	2nd place
2017-18	Champions League; Sixth place	Preliminary round (Group B)	(Germany) Spandau 04	8-4	9-10	2nd place
2017-18	Champions League; Sixth place	Preliminary round (Group B)	(Hungary) Szolnok	6-3	11-10	2nd place
2017-18	Champions League; Sixth place	Quarter-final (F8)	(Spain) Barceloneta	4–9		
2017-18	Champions League; Sixth place	5th-8th semifinal (F8)	(Germany) Spandau 04	10–6		
2017-18	Champions League; Sixth place	5th-6th placement (F6)	(Hungary) Szolnok	6–10		
2018-19	Champions League	Preliminary round (Group A)	(Italy) Pro Recco	7-16	7-17	6th place
2018-19	Champions League	Preliminary round (Group A)	(Spain) Barceloneta	10-16	7-12	6th place
2018-19	Champions League	Preliminary round (Group A)	(Russia) Dynamo Moscow	12-10	13-15	6th place
2018-19	Champions League	Preliminary round (Group A)	(Romania) Steaua București	13-9	13-11	6th place
2018-19	Champions League	Preliminary round (Group A)	(Serbia) Crvena zvezda	17-11	13-12	6th place
2018-19	Champions League	Preliminary round (Group A)	(Hungary) Ferencváros	9-12	9-16	6th place
2018-19	Champions League	Preliminary round (Group A)	(Italy) Brescia	8-11	6-11	6th place
2019-20	Euro Cup	Quarter-finals	(France) Strasbourg	12-8	6-10	18–18 (4–3 p)
2019-20	Euro Cup	Semi-finals	(Italy) Brescia	(canc.)	3-6	Cancelled

== Notable former players ==
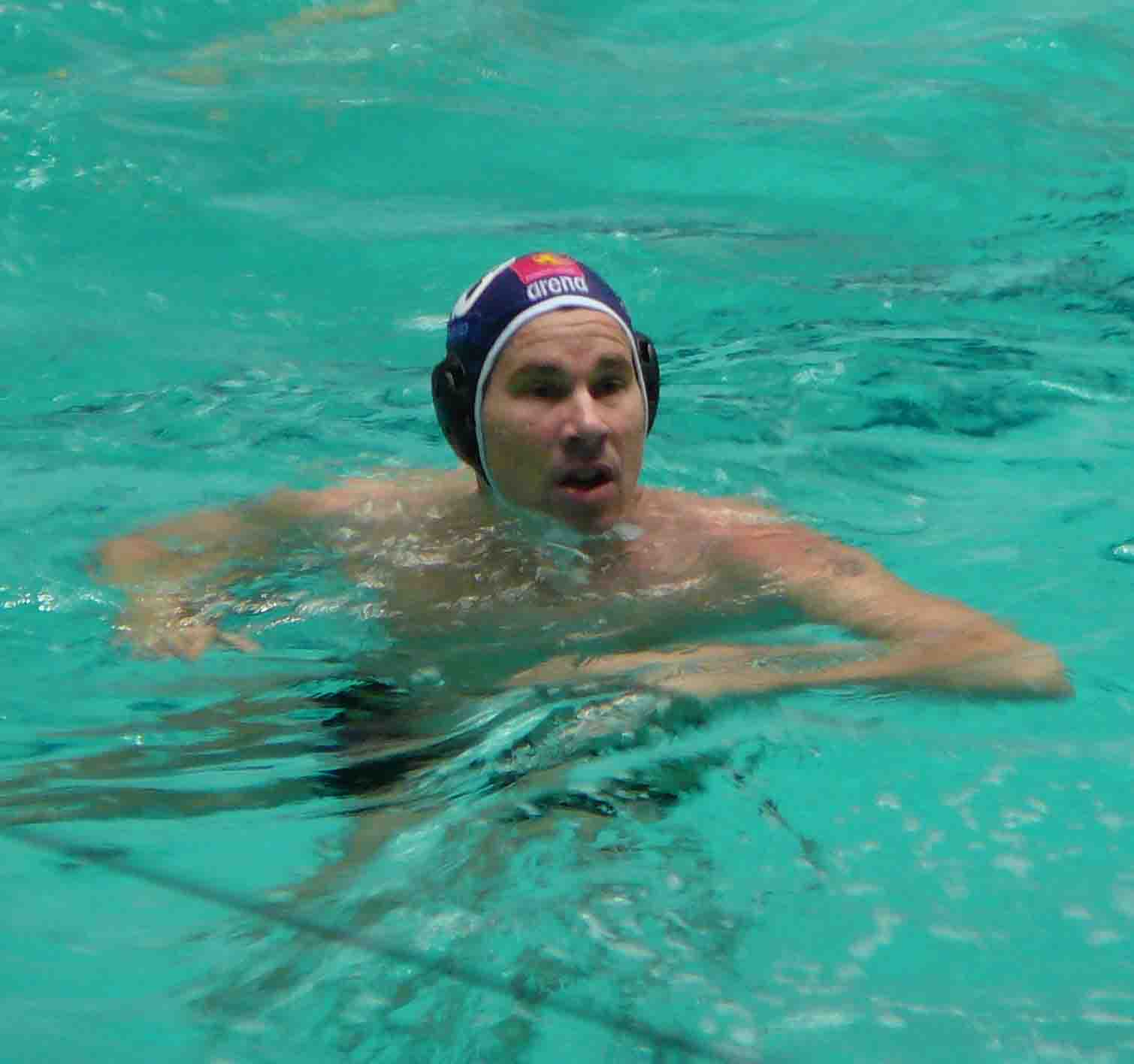
Péter Biros

=== Olympic champions ===
- Dénes Pócsik – 24 years (1954-1978) 1964 Tokyo
- András Bodnár – 9 years (1952-1961) 1964 Tokyo
- Péter Biros – 9 years (2007-2016) 2000 Sydney, 2004 Athens, 2008 Beijing
- Zoltán Szécsi - 7 years (2004-2005, 2007-2013) 2000 Sydney, 2004 Athens, 2008 Beijing
- István Hevesi – 6 years (1945-1951) 1956 Melbourne
- Norbert Hosnyánszky – 6 years (2010-2012, 2014- ____) 2008 Beijing
- Gábor Kis – 5 years (2004-2008, 2010-2011) 2008 Beijing
- (Serbia) Branislav Mitrović – 4 years (2014-____) 2016 Rio de Janeiro
- (Serbia) Miloš Ćuk – 3 years (2014-2017) 2016 Rio de Janeiro
- Miklós Ambrus – 2 years (1950-1952) 1964 Tokyo
- Tamás Märcz – 1 year (2006-2007) 2000 Sydney
- Norbert Madaras – junior years 2004 Athens, 2008 Beijing

== Former coaches ==
- (Hungary) György Gerendás (2004–2014)
- (Hungary) Norbert Dabrowski (2014– present)
