= 1990–91 OB I bajnoksag season =

Hungarian ice hockey season

The 1990–91 OB I bajnokság season was the 54th season of the OB I bajnokság, the top level of ice hockey in Hungary. Eight teams participated in the league, and Ferencvarosi TC won the championship.

== Regular season ==
=== Final round ===
	Club	GP	W	T	L	Goals	Pts
1.	Ferencvárosi TC	18	16	1	1	196:48	33
2.	Lehel SE Jászberény	18	14	2	2	138:58	30
3.	Újpesti Dózsa SC	18	12	1	5	154:75	25
4.	Alba Volán Székesfehérvár	18	7	1	10	103:136	15

=== Qualification round ===
	Club	GP	W	T	L	Goals	Pts
5.	Miskolci HC	18	10	1	7	102:90	21
6.	Nepstadion NSzE Budapest	18	5	1	12	83:147	11
7.	Újpesti Dózsa SC II	18	2	1	15	74:161	5
8.	Sziketherm HK Dunaújváros	18	2	0	16	64:199	4

== Playoffs ==
=== 7th place ===
- Újpesti Dózsa SC II - Sziketherm HK Dunaújváros 2:0 (4:3, 5:3)

=== 5th place ===
- Miskolci HC - Nepstadion NSzE Budapest 2:0 (7:3, 8:4)

=== 3rd place ===
- Újpesti Dózsa SC - Alba Volán Székesfehérvár 3:0 (6:3, 10:2, 9:3)

=== Final ===
- Ferencvárosi TC - Lehel SE Jászberény 4:2 (0:3, 18:3, 3:2, 2:6, 7:2, 3:2)
