= Budapesti VSC (men's water polo) =

Hungarian water polo team

BVSC-Zugló
- Full name: Budapesti Vasutas Sport Club
- Nickname: Vasutasok (The Railwaymen)
- Short name: BVSC
- Founded: 1949; 77 years ago (parent club in 1911)
- League: Országos Bajnokság I
- Based in: Budapest, Hungary
- Arena: Szőnyi úti uszoda
- Colors: Blue and yellow
- President: Ágnes Zsoldos
- Head coach: Dániel Varga
- Championships: 7 Hungarian Championships; 5 Hungarian Cups; 1 Hungarian Super Cup
- 2021–22: Országos Bajnokság I, 6th of 14
- Website: bvscvizilabda.hu

Budapesti Vasutas Sport Club is a water polo club from Budapest, Hungary. The team competes in the Országos Bajnokság I.

== Naming history ==
- Budapesti Lokomotív (Bp. Lokomotív): (1949 –1954)
- Bp. Törekvés: (1955 – 1956)
- Budapesti Vasutas Sport Club (BVSC): (1957 – 1991/92)
- BVSC-Schiller Opel: (1991/92 – 1992/93) - the first naming sponsor
- BVSC-Westel: (1992/93 – 1997/98)
- BVSC-Brendon: (1997/98 – 2003/04)
- BVSC-Turbo: (2003/04 – 2004/05)
- BVSC: (2004/05 – 2007/08)
- BVSC-Atlantis Casino: (2007/08 – 2008/09)
- BVSC-Zugló: (2008/09 – 2013/14)
- BVSC-Wáberer Hungária-Zugló: (2013/14 – 2015/16)
- BVSC-Zugló: (2015/16)
- MKB-Euroleasing-BVSC-Zugló: (2016/17 – 2017/18)
- BVSC-Zugló: (2018/19 – ... )

== Honours ==
=== Domestic competitions ===
- Országos Bajnokság I (National Championship of Hungary)

Champions (7): 1966, 1984–85, 1986–87, 1995–96, 1996–97, 1997–98, 1998–99
Runners-up (9): 1962, 1981, 1982, 1983, 1984, 1985–86, 1992–93, 1999–00, 2000–01
Third place (6): 1958, 1980, 1993–94, 2001–02, 2002–03, 2003–04

- Magyar Kupa (National Cup of Hungary)

Winners (5): 1982, 1986–87, 1994–95, 1999–00, 2002–03
Finalist (4): 1958, 1959, 1983, 1984

- Szuperkupa (Super Cup of Hungary); Championship vs. Cup winner

Winners (): 2003

=== European competitions ===
- LEN Champions League (Champions Cup)

Runners-up (1): 1985–86

- LEN Euro Cup

Semi-finalist (1): 2001–02

- LEN Cup Winners' Cup

Runners-up (2): 1983–84, 1995–96

== Current squad ==
Season 2017–18

№	Nat.	Player	Birth Date	Position	L/R
1	(Hungary)	Zsolt Györke	March 12, 1986 (age 40)	Goalkeeper	
2	(Hungary)	Károly Czigány	October 31, 1984 (age 41)		
3	(Hungary)	Miklós Csapó	January 21, 1993 (age 33)		
4	(Hungary)	Bence Szabó	February 29, 1996 (age 30)		
5	(Hungary)	Kristóf Várnai	August 15, 1995 (age 30)		
6	(Hungary)	Béla Török	March 23, 1990 (age 36)		
7	(Hungary)	Krisztián Létay (c)	February 9, 1983 (age 43)		
8	(Hungary)	Ferenc Ambrus	December 9, 1986 (age 39)		
9	(Hungary)	Péter Kovács	May 16, 1991 (age 35)		
10	(Hungary)	Mátyás Pásztor	February 20, 1987 (age 39)		
11	(Hungary)	Csaba Mészáros	October 5, 1994 (age 31)		
12	(Hungary)	Péter Sugár	March 20, 1999 (age 27)		
13	(Hungary)	Norbert Mátyok	June 15, 1996 (age 30)		
14	(Hungary)	Dániel Szakonyi	March 1, 1994 (age 32)	Goalkeeper	

=== Staff ===
Technical Staff
Section Chairman	(Hungary) Ágnes Zsoldos
Section leader	(Hungary) Csaba Mészáros
Head coach	(Hungary) Levente Szűcs

== Recent seasons ==
As of 2 September 2023.

Season	Tier	League	Pos.	Domestic cup	European competitions	
1984–85	1	OB I	1st	Runner-up		
1985–86	1	OB I	2nd	Quarterfinalist	1 European Cup	F
1986–87	1	OB I	1st	Champion		
1987–88	1	OB I	9th	Fourth place	1 European Cup	QF
1988–89	1	OB I	12th	Round of 16		
1989–90	1	OB I	10th	Semifinalist		
1990–91	1	OB I	8th	Round of 16		
1991–92	1	OB I	6th	Round of 16		
1992–93	1	OB I	2nd			
1993–94	1	OB I	3rd			
1994–95	1	OB I	5th	Champion		
1995–96	1	OB I	1st		2 Cup Winners' Cup	F
1996–97	1	OB I	1st		1 Champions League	PR
1997–98	1	OB I	1st		1 Champions League	PR
1998–99	1	OB I	1st		1 Champions League	PR
1999–00	1	OB I	2nd	Champion	1 Champions League	3rd
2000–01	1	OB I	2nd	Semifinalist	2 Cup Winners' Cup	SF
2001–02	1	OB I	3rd	Round of 16	3 LEN Cup	SF
2002–03	1	OB I	3rd	Champion	3 LEN Cup	QR
2003–04	1	OB I	3rd	did not held	1 Euroleague	PR
2004–05	1	OB I	8th			
2005–06	1	OB I	10th			
2006–07	1	OB I	8th			
2007–08	1	OB I	9th			
2008–09	1	OB I	8th			
2009–10	1	OB I	7th	Quarterfinalist		
2010–11	1	OB I	9th	Quarterfinalist		
2011–12	1	OB I	11th	Quarterfinalist		
2012–13	1	OB I	7th	Preliminary round		
2013–14	1	OB I	7th	Preliminary round		
2014–15	1	OB I	9th	Quarterfinalist		
2015–16	1	OB I	5th	Preliminary round		
2016–17	1	OB I	6th	Preliminary round	2 Euro Cup	QF
2017–18	1	OB I	5th	Preliminary round		
2018–19	1	OB I	6th	Preliminary round	2 Euro Cup	QR2
2019–20	1	OB I	10th^{1}	Preliminary round		
2020–21	1	OB I	4th	Fourth place		
2021–22	1	OB I	6th	Quarterfinalist	2 Euro Cup	QF
2022–23	1	OB I	5th	Quarterfinalist	2 Euro Cup	QR2
2023–24	1	OB I		Quarterfinalist	2 Euro Cup	

^1 Cancelled due to the COVID-19 pandemic.

=== In European competition ===
- Participations in Champions League (European Cup, Euroleague): 8x
- Participations in Euro Cup (LEN Cup): 5x
- Participations in Cup Winners' Cup: 1x

Season	Competition	Round	Club	Home	Away	Aggregate
1966-67	European Cup	Quarter-final round	(Italy) Pro Recco	2-3		3rd place
1966-67	European Cup	Quarter-final round	(East Germany) Dinamo Magdeburg	5-5		3rd place
1966-67	European Cup	Quarter-final round	(Sweden) Tunafors Eskilstuna	3-1		3rd place
1983-84	Cup Winners' Cup; Finalist	Finals	(Socialist Federal Republic of Yugoslavia) POŠK			
1985-86	European Cup; Finalist	Quarter-final round	(West Germany) Spandau 04	4-11		2nd place
1985-86	European Cup; Finalist	Quarter-final round	(Netherlands) Alphen	10-3		2nd place
1985-86	European Cup; Finalist	Quarter-final round	(Italy) Posillipo	9-8		2nd place
1985-86	European Cup; Finalist	Semi-finals	(Socialist Federal Republic of Yugoslavia) Jug Dubrovnik	10-7	6-6	16–13
1985-86	European Cup; Finalist	Finals	(West Germany) Spandau 04	9-7	4-7	13–14
1987-88	European Cup	Quarter-finals	(West Germany) Spandau 04	9-7	8-13	17–20
1995-96	Cup Winners' Cup; Finalist	Finals	(Italy) Racing Roma			
1996-97	Champions League	Preliminary round Blue Group	(Spain) Barcelona	7-9	8-9	3rd place
1996-97	Champions League	Preliminary round Blue Group	(Croatia) HAVK Mladost	9-12	6-8	3rd place
1996-97	Champions League	Preliminary round Blue Group	(Slovakia) NCHZ Nováky	11-10	10-9	3rd place
1997-98	Champions League	Preliminary round Blue Group	(Federal Republic of Yugoslavia) Bečej	13-14	4-8	4th place
1997-98	Champions League	Preliminary round Blue Group	(Croatia) HAVK Mladost	8-7	8-9	4th place
1997-98	Champions League	Preliminary round Blue Group	(Russia) Spartak Volgograd	8-8	5-8	4th place
1998-99	Champions League	Preliminary round Blue Group	(Federal Republic of Yugoslavia) Bečej	7-7	6-9	3rd place
1998-99	Champions League	Preliminary round Blue Group	(Italy) Posillipo	7-6	8-9	3rd place
1998-99	Champions League	Preliminary round Blue Group	(Greece) Vouliagmeni	11-5	7-9	3rd place
1999-00	Champions League; Third place	Preliminary round Blue Group	(Croatia) POŠK	6-5	6-6	1st place
1999-00	Champions League; Third place	Preliminary round Blue Group	(Greece) Olympiacos	6-6	9-9	1st place
1999-00	Champions League; Third place	Preliminary round Blue Group	(France) Olympic Nice	9-4	5-4	1st place
1999-00	Champions League; Third place	Semi-final (F4)	(Croatia) HAVK Mladost	4–6		
1999-00	Champions League; Third place	Bronze match (F4)	(Croatia) POŠK	13–7		
2000-01	Cup Winners' Cup	Quarter-finals	(Croatia) POŠK	8-6	10-4	18–10
2000-01	Cup Winners' Cup	Semi-finals	(Spain) Barceloneta	10-7	8-12	18–19
2001-02	LEN Cup	Quarter-finals	(Spain) Real Canoe	11-9	7-8	18–17
2001-02	LEN Cup	Semi-finals	(Italy) Leonessa	10-10	6-9	16–19
2002-03	LEN Cup	elimination in qualifying round				
2003-04	Euroleague	Preliminary round (Group C)	(Croatia) HAVK Mladost	8-7	11-13	3rd place
2003-04	Euroleague	Preliminary round (Group C)	(France) Olympic Nice	11-8	8-8	3rd place
2003-04	Euroleague	Preliminary round (Group C)	(Serbia and Montenegro) Primorac Kotor	8-9	1-8	3rd place
2016-17	Euro Cup	Quarter-finals	(Italy) Sport Management	13-14	6-11	19–25
2018-19	Euro Cup	elimination in Second qualifying round				
2021-22	Euro Cup	Quarter-finals	(Spain) Barcelona	9-12	6-6	15–18
2022-23	Euro Cup	elimination in Second qualifying round				

== Notable former players ==
=== Olympic champions ===
- György Horkai – 15 years (1970-1985) 1976 Montreal
- Ferenc Konrád – 9 years (1956-1965) 1976 Montreal
- Zoltán Szécsi – 9 years (1995-2004) 2000 Sydney, 2004 Athens, 2008 Beijing
- János Konrád – 7 years (1956-1963) 1964 Tokyo
- Zsolt Varga – 7 years (1990-1997) 2000 Sydney
- Tamás Märcz – 7 years (1993-2000) 2000 Sydney
- Gábor Kis – 7 years (1997-2004) 2008 Beijing
- György Gerendás – 4 years (1983-1987) 1976 Montreal
- Gergely Kiss – 4 years (1986-1990) 2000 Sydney, 2004 Athens, 2008 Beijing
- Tamás Faragó – 3 years (1965-1968) 1976 Montreal
- Norbert Madaras – ? years ( -2001) 2004 Athens, 2008 Beijing
- Norbert Hosnyánszky – half year (1994) 2008 Beijing

== Former coaches ==
- (Hungary) Károly Laky
- (Hungary) Dezső Gyarmati (1981–1988)
- (Hungary) Tamás Faragó (1990–1992)
- (Hungary) György Gerendás (1992–2004)
- (Hungary) Balázs Vincze ( –2010)
- (Hungary) Norbert Dabrowski (2010–2013)
- (Hungary) Tamás Märcz (2013–2016)
- (Hungary) Levente Szűcs (2017– present)
