= 1986–87 Országos Bajnokság I (men's water polo) =

Water polo league season

OB I
- Season: 1986-87
- Champions: BVSC
- European Cup: BVSC

1986–87 Országos Bajnokság I (men's water polo) was the 81st water polo championship in Hungary. Fourteen teams played each other twice for the title.

== Final list ==
#	Team	M	W	D	L	G+	G−	P	Notes
1.	BVSC	26	19	3	4	268	219	41	1987-88 European Cup quarter final
2.	Szolnoki Vízügy	26	18	3	5	248	201	39	
3.	Bp. Spartacus	26	17	2	7	249	216	36	
4.	Tungsram SC	26	16	3	7	256	216	35	
5.	Szeged SC	26	14	6	6	242	229	34	
6.	Vasas SC	26	13	2	11	289	250	28	
7.	Eger SE	26	11	5	10	232	245	27	
8.	Tatabányai Bányász	26	11	5	10	261	253	27	
9.	Ferencvárosi TC	26	11	4	11	270	257	26	
10.	Újpesti Dózsa	26	11	2	13	254	244	24	
11.	Szentesi Vízmű	26	8	3	15	252	286	19	
12.	Bp. Honvéd	26	6	2	18	215	248	14	
13.	OSC	26	6	1	19	221	267	13	
14.	Kecskeméti VSC	26	0	1	25	198	324	1	

* M: Matches W: Win D: Drawn L: Lost G+: Goals earned G−: Goals got P: Point

1986-87 OB I
Champions
BVSC
3rd Title

== Season statistics ==
Location of teams in 2014-15 Országos Bajnokság I

=== Number of teams by counties ===
	County (megye)	No. teams	Teams
1	Budapest	7	BVSC, FTC, Honvéd, KSI, OSC, UVSE and Vasas
2	Csongrád	2	Szeged and Szentes
3	Baranya	1	PVSK
3	Hajdú-Bihar	1	Debrecen
3	Heves	1	Eger
3	Jász-Nagykun-Szolnok	1	Szolnok
3	Somogy	1	Kaposvár

== Sources ==
- Gyarmati Dezső: Aranykor (Hérodotosz Könyvkiadó és Értékesítő Bt., Budapest, 2002.)
- A magyar sport évkönyve 1987
