= 1996–97 Országos Bajnokság I (men's water polo) =

Water polo league season

OB I
- Season: 1996–97
- Champions: BVSC

1996–97 Országos Bajnokság I (men's water polo) was the 91st water polo championship in Hungary.

== First stage ==
#	Team	M	W	D	L	G+	G−	P	Comments
1.	BVSC-Westel	22	18	2	2	296	176	56	
2.	Ferencvárosi TC-Vitalin	22	18	2	2	277	121	56	
3.	Vasas SC-Plaket	22	17	4	1	242	122	53	deducted 2 points
4.	Újpesti TE-Office & Home	22	14	3	5	240	160	45	
5.	Heliomed-Szegedi VE	22	10	5	7	207	178	35	
6.	Bp. Spartacus	22	10	5	7	212	179	35	
7.	ÚVMK Eger-Egervin	22	8	1	13	204	231	25	
8.	Kontavill-Szentesi VK	22	6	4	12	165	186	22	
9.	Szolnoki MTE	22	5	4	13	181	260	19	
10.	OSC	22	5	2	15	145	210	17	
11.	Hódmezővásárhelyi VSC	22	3	2	17	138	291	11	
12.	Csanádi Árpád KSI	22	1	0	21	128	321	3	

Championship Playoff

Pld - Played; W - Won; L - Lost; PF - Points for; PA - Points against; Diff - Difference; Pts - Points.

== Championship Playoff ==
Quarterfinals
1	BVSC-Westel	11	14
8	Kontavill-Szentesi VK	4	6
4	Újpesti TE-Office & Home	7	5	9
5	Heliomed-Szegedi VE	4	8	3
3	Vasas SC-Plaket	8	9
6	Bp. Spartacus	7	5
2	Ferencvárosi TC-Vitalin	16	17
7	ÚVMK Eger-Egervin	6	9

Semifinals
1	BVSC-Westel	9	11
4	Újpesti TE-Office & Home	7	9
3	Vasas SC-Plaket	10	9
2	Ferencvárosi TC-Vitalin	9	8

Final
1	BVSC-Westel	12	12
3	Vasas SC-Plaket	10	11

OB I 1996–97
Champions

BVSC
5th Title

== Sources ==
- Gyarmati Dezső: Aranykor (Hérodotosz Könyvkiadó és Értékesítő Bt., Budapest, 2002.)
