= 1910 Országos Bajnokság I (men's water polo) =

Water polo league season

OB I
- Season: 1910
- Champions: Ferencváros

1910 Országos Bajnokság I (men's water polo) was the seventh water polo championship in Hungary. There were two teams who played one match for the title.

== Final list ==
| # | Team | M | W | D | L | G+ | G− | P |
|---|---|---|---|---|---|---|---|---|
| 1. | Ferencvárosi TC | 1 | 1 | 0 | 0 | 6 | 1 | 2 |
| 2. | MUE | 1 | 0 | 0 | 1 | 1 | 6 | 0 |

* M: Matches W: Win D: Drawn L: Lost G+: Goals earned G−: Goals got P: Point

OB I 1910
Champions

Ferencváros
1st Title

== Sources ==
- Gyarmati Dezső: Aranykor (Hérodotosz Könyvkiadó és Értékesítő Bt., Budapest, 2002.)
