= 1940 Országos Bajnokság I (men's water polo) =

Water polo league season

OB I
- Season: 1940
- Champions: BSE

1940 Országos Bajnokság I (men's water polo) was the 34th water polo championship in Hungary. There were ten teams who played one-round match for the title.

== Final list ==
#	Team	M	W	D	L	G+	G−	P
1.	BSE	9	9	0	0	50	17	18
2.	Újpesti TE	9	8	0	1	62	5	16
3.	MAC	9	7	0	2	52	10	14
4.	Ferencvárosi TC	9	6	0	3	29	23	12
5.	MTK	9	3	1	5	19	31	7
6.	BEAC	9	3	1	5	20	38	7
7.	MOVE Eger SE	9	2	2	5	13	25	6
8.	III. ker. TVE	9	3	0	6	15	43	6
9.	Tatabányai SC	9	2	0	7	15	40	4
10.	Nemzeti SC	9	0	0	9	10	53	0

* M: Matches W: Win D: Drawn L: Lost G+: Goals earned G−: Goals got P: Point

OB I 1940
Champions

BSE
1st Title

== Sources ==
- Gyarmati Dezső: Aranykor (Hérodotosz Könyvkiadó és Értékesítő Bt., Budapest, 2002.)
