= 1939 Országos Bajnokság I (men's water polo) =

Water polo league season

OB I
- Season: 1939
- Champions: Újpest

1939 Országos Bajnokság I (men's water polo) was the 33rd water polo championship in Hungary. There were ten teams who played one-round match for the title.

== Final list ==
#	Team	M	W	D	L	G+	G−	P	Comments
1.	Újpesti TE	8	8	0	0	50	6	16	
2.	MTK	8	7	0	1	41	13	14	
3.	MAC	8	6	0	2	25	14	12	
4.	BSE	8	4	1	3	22	24	9	
5.	Nemzeti SC	8	3	0	5	14	32	6	
6.	BEAC	8	2	1	5	18	23	5	
7.	Ferencvárosi TC	8	1	2	5	17	33	4	
8.	MOVE Eger SE	8	2	0	6	8	22	4	
9.	III. ker. TVE	8	1	0	7	11	39	2	
10.	Szegedi UE	-	-	-	-	-	-	-	deleted

* M: Matches W: Win D: Drawn L: Lost G+: Goals earned G−: Goals got P: Point

OB I 1939
Champions

Újpest
10th Title

== 2. Class ==
1. Tatabányai SC, 2. NTE, 3. ETE, 4. Szegedi VSE.

== Sources ==
- Gyarmati Dezső: Aranykor (Hérodotosz Könyvkiadó és Értékesítő Bt., Budapest, 2002.)
- Magyar Sport Almanach 1937-1939
