= 1997–98 Országos Bajnokság I (men's water polo) =

Water polo league season

OB I
- Season: 1997–98
- Champions: BVSC

1997–98 Országos Bajnokság I (men's water polo) was the 92nd water polo championship in Hungary.

== First stage ==
#	Team	M	W	D	L	G+	G−	P
1.	BVSC-Westel	22	19	3	0	286	159	41
2.	Vasas SC-Plaket	22	18	4	0	236	139	40
3.	Ferencvárosi TC-Vitalin	22	14	5	3	207	127	33
4.	Újpesti TE-Office & Home	22	15	0	7	191	116	30
5.	Tabán Trafik-Szegedi VE	22	13	3	6	180	156	29
6.	Bp. Spartacus	22	13	3	6	192	129	29
7.	Szolnoki MTE	22	6	3	13	149	201	15
8.	Kontavill-Szentesi VK	22	5	2	15	159	197	12
9.	ÚVMK Eger-Egervin	22	5	2	15	150	210	12
10.	MAFC	22	5	1	16	119	206	11
11.	OSC	22	3	3	16	133	227	9
12.	Hódmezővásárhelyi VSC	22	1	1	20	107	242	3

Championship Playoff

Pld - Played; W - Won; L - Lost; PF - Points for; PA - Points against; Diff - Difference; Pts - Points.

== Championship Playoff ==
Quarterfinals
1	BVSC-Westel	17	17
8	Kontavill-Szentesi VK	1	6
4	Újpesti TE-Office & Home	9	8	15
5	Tabán Trafik-Szegedi VE	5	9	14
3	Ferencvárosi TC-Vitalin	8	6	5	7
6	Bp. Spartacus	7	5	6	3
2	Vasas SC-Plaket	15	15
7	Szolnoki MTE	4	8

Semifinals
1	BVSC-Westel	7	8
4	Újpesti TE-Office & Home	6	2
3	Ferencvárosi TC-Vitalin	7	7	10	7	10	11
2	Vasas SC-Plaket	4	8	7	8	9	12

Final
1	BVSC-Westel	10	7
2	Vasas SC-Plaket	9	6

OB I 1997–98
Champions

BVSC
6th Title

== Sources ==
- Gyarmati Dezső: Aranykor (Hérodotosz Könyvkiadó és Értékesítő Bt., Budapest, 2002.)
