= 1982 Országos Bajnokság I (men's water polo) =

Water polo league season

OB I
- Season: 1982
- Champions: Vasas

1982 Országos Bajnokság I (men's water polo) was the 76th water polo championship in Hungary. There were fourteen teams who played in the two round match for the title.

== Final list ==
#	Team	M	W	D	L	G+	G−	P
1.	Vasas SC	26	23	2	1	359	223	48
2.	BVSC	26	19	3	4	296	226	41
3.	Bp. Honvéd	26	18	2	6	286	252	38
4.	Újpesti Dózsa	26	15	3	8	245	218	33
5.	Szolnoki Vízügy	26	14	4	8	261	247	32
6.	Tatabányai Bányász	26	11	7	8	242	237	29
7.	Vasas Izzó	26	13	2	11	269	249	28
8.	Medicor-OSC	26	11	2	13	249	260	24
9.	Szegedi EOL AK	26	10	2	14	226	255	22
10.	Ferencvárosi TC	26	9	2	15	249	261	20
11.	Eger SE	26	6	2	18	250	301	14
12.	Bp. Spartacus	26	5	2	19	230	284	12
13.	Volán SC	26	5	2	19	224	317	12
14.	Szentesi Vízmű	26	5	1	20	223	279	11

* M: Matches W: Win D: Drawn L: Lost G+: Goals earned G−: Goals got P: Point

OB I 1982
Champions

Vasas
10th Title

== Sources ==
- Gyarmati Dezső: Aranykor (Hérodotosz Könyvkiadó és Értékesítő Bt., Budapest, 2002.)
