= 1934 Országos Bajnokság I (men's water polo) =

Water polo league season

OB I
- Season: 1934
- Champions: Újpest

1934 Országos Bajnokság I (men's water polo) was the 28th water polo championship in Hungary. There were eight teams who played one-round match for the title.

== Final list ==
| # | Team | M | W | D | L | G+ | G− | P |
|---|---|---|---|---|---|---|---|---|
| 1. | Újpesti TE | 7 | 6 | 0 | 1 | 39 | 8 | 12 |
| 2. | III. ker. TVE | 7 | 5 | 1 | 1 | 17 | 9 | 11 |
| 3. | MTK | 7 | 5 | 0 | 2 | 23 | 15 | 10 |
| 4. | MAC | 7 | 4 | 1 | 2 | 19 | 11 | 9 |
| 5. | Ferencvárosi TC | 7 | 2 | 2 | 3 | 23 | 25 | 6 |
| 6. | Szegedi UE | 7 | 3 | 0 | 4 | 25 | 23 | 6 |
| 7. | MOVE Eger SE | 7 | 1 | 0 | 6 | 9 | 31 | 2 |
| 8. | Tatabányai SC | 7 | 0 | 0 | 7 | 7 | 40 | 0 |

* M: Matches W: Win D: Drawn L: Lost G+: Goals earned G−: Goals got P: Point

OB I 1934
Champions

Újpest
5th Title

== Sources ==
- Gyarmati Dezső: Aranykor (Hérodotosz Könyvkiadó és Értékesítő Bt., Budapest, 2002.)
- Magyar Sport Almanach 1931-1934
