= 1992–93 Országos Bajnokság I (men's water polo) =

Water polo league season

OB I
- Season: 1992–93
- Champions: Újpest

1992–93 Országos Bajnokság I (men's water polo) was the 87th water polo championship in Hungary.

== First stage ==
#	Team	M	W	D	L	G+	G−	P
1.	Újpesti TE	22	17	2	3	252	176	36
2.	BVSC-Schiller Opel	22	15	3	4	252	188	33
3.	Vasas SC-Plaket	22	13	3	6	240	199	29
4.	Tungsram SC	22	12	5	5	226	184	29
5.	Szeged SC	22	13	3	6	202	170	29
6.	Ferencvárosi TC-Törley	22	10	3	9	192	172	23
7.	Szentesi SC	22	8	5	9	188	202	21
8.	Elektrosoft SE Szolnok	22	9	2	11	200	216	20
9.	Eger SE	22	8	2	12	202	210	18
10.	Csanádi Árpád KSI	22	5	0	17	163	242	10
11.	OSC	22	3	3	16	167	227	9
12.	Ceglédi VSE	22	3	1	18	172	262	7

Championship Playoff

Pld - Played; W - Won; L - Lost; PF - Points for; PA - Points against; Diff - Difference; Pts - Points.

== Championship Playoff ==
Semifinals
1	Újpesti TE	8	9
4	Tungsram SC	6	7
2	BVSC-Schiller Opel	12	9
3	Vasas SC-Plaket	11	8

Final
1	Újpesti TE	10	11
2	BVSC-Schiller Opel	9	3

== Final standing ==
Qualified for the 1993–94 LEN European Cup
Qualified for the 1993–94 LEN Cup Winners' Cup
Relegation to the 1993–94 OB I/B

Rank	Team
1st place, gold medalist(s)	Újpesti TE
2nd place, silver medalist(s)	BVSC-Schiller Opel
3rd place, bronze medalist(s)	Vasas-Plaket
4	Tungsram SC
5	Szeged SC
6	Ferencvárosi TC-Törley
7	Szentesi SC
8	Elektrosoft SE Szolnok
9	Eger SC
10	Csanádi Árpád KSI
11	OSC
12	Ceglédi VSE

1992–93 OB I Champions

Újpesti TE
24th Title

Head coach
István Kovács

== Sources ==
- Gyarmati Dezső: Aranykor (Hérodotosz Könyvkiadó és Értékesítő Bt., Budapest, 2002.)
