= 1933 Országos Bajnokság I (men's water polo) =

Water polo league season

OB I
- Season: 1933
- Champions: Újpest

1933 Országos Bajnokság I (men's water polo) was the 27th water polo championship in Hungary. There were nine teams who played one-round match for the title.

== Final list ==
#	Team	M	W	D	L	G+	G−	P
1.	Újpesti TE	8	6	2	0	58	13	14
2.	MAC	8	6	1	1	40	17	13
3.	MTK	8	6	0	2	37	15	12
4.	III. ker. TVE	8	5	2	1	21	11	12
5.	Ferencvárosi TC	8	3	1	4	19	33	7
6.	Szegedi UE	8	3	0	5	19	28	6
7.	MOVE Eger SE	8	3	0	5	19	28	6
8.	BBTE	8	1	0	7	8	38	2
9.	MUE	8	0	0	8	3	41	0

* M: Matches W: Win D: Drawn L: Lost G+: Goals earned G−: Goals got P: Point

OB I 1933
Champions

Újpest
4th Title

== Sources ==
- Gyarmati Dezső: Aranykor (Hérodotosz Könyvkiadó és Értékesítő Bt., Budapest, 2002.)
- Magyar Sport Almanach 1931-1934
