= 1938 Országos Bajnokság I (men's water polo) =

Water polo league season

OB I
- Season: 1938
- Champions: Újpest

1938 Országos Bajnokság I (men's water polo) was the 32nd water polo championship in Hungary. There were nine teams who played one round match for the title.

== Final list ==
| # | Team | M | W | D | L | G+ | G− | P |
|---|---|---|---|---|---|---|---|---|
| 1. | Újpesti TE | 8 | 7 | 1 | 0 | 38 | 11 | 15 |
| 2. | MTK | 8 | 6 | 1 | 1 | 41 | 12 | 13 |
| 3. | MAC | 8 | 5 | 2 | 1 | 20 | 9 | 12 |
| 4. | BSE | 8 | 3 | 4 | 1 | 33 | 22 | 10 |
| 5. | Ferencvárosi TC | 8 | 2 | 2 | 4 | 22 | 28 | 6 |
| 6. | Szegedi UE | 8 | 1 | 3 | 4 | 14 | 28 | 5 |
| 7. | BEAC | 8 | 1 | 2 | 5 | 13 | 32 | 4 |
| 8. | MOVE Eger SE | 8 | 1 | 2 | 5 | 9 | 36 | 4 |
| 9. | III. ker. TVE | 8 | 1 | 1 | 6 | 18 | 30 | 3 |

* M: Matches W: Win D: Drawn L: Lost G+: Goals earned G−: Goals got P: Point

OB I 1938
Champions

Újpest
9th Title

== 2. Class ==
1. NSC, 2. Szegedi VSE, 3. NTE, 4. Tatabányai SC.
