= 1993–94 Országos Bajnokság I (men's water polo) =

Water polo league season

OB I
- Season: 1993–94
- Champions: Újpest

1993–94 Országos Bajnokság I (men's water polo) was the 88th water polo championship in Hungary.

== First stage ==
#	Team	M	W	D	L	G+	G−	P
1.	Vasas SC-Plaket	22	17	2	3	247	163	36
2.	Újpesti TE-Primavera	22	15	6	1	236	157	36
3.	BVSC-Westel	22	15	3	4	257	188	33
4.	Ferencvárosi TC	22	15	2	5	237	177	32
5.	Elektrosoft SE Szolnok	22	12	5	5	225	196	29
6.	Szegedi VE	22	14	1	7	199	182	29
7.	Tungsram SC	22	10	2	10	205	185	22
8.	ÚVK Eger	22	8	2	12	195	202	18
9.	Kontavill-Szentesi SC	22	8	1	13	197	215	17
10.	Csanádi Árpád KSI	22	3	0	19	149	260	6
11.	Bp. Spartacus-Tribu	22	2	1	19	159	247	5
12.	OSC	22	0	1	21	163	299	1

Championship Playoff

Pld - Played; W - Won; L - Lost; PF - Points for; PA - Points against; Diff - Difference; Pts - Points.

== Championship Playoff ==
Quarterfinals
3	BVSC-Westel	10	11
6	Szegedi VE	9	6
4	Ferencvárosi TC	12	4
5	Elektrosoft SE Szolnok	5	3

Semifinals
2	Újpesti TE-Primavera	11	14
3	BVSC-Westel	9	9
1	Vasas SC-Plaket	10	8	14
4	Ferencvárosi TC	9	9	11

Final
2	Újpesti TE-Primavera	8	10
1	Vasas SC-Plaket	7	9

== Final standing ==
Qualified for the 1994–95 LEN European Cup
Qualified for the 1994–95 LEN Cup Winners' Cup
Relegation to the 1994–95 OB I/B

Rank	Team
1st place, gold medalist(s)	Újpesti TE-Primavera
2nd place, silver medalist(s)	Vasas-Plaket
3rd place, bronze medalist(s)	BVSC-Westel
4	Ferencvárosi TC
5	Elektrosoft SE Szolnok
6	Szegedi VE
7	Tungsram SC
8	ÚVK Eger
9	Kontavill-Szentesi SC
10	Csanádi Árpád KSI
11	Bp. Spartacus-Tribu
12	OSC

1993–94 OB I Champions

Újpesti TE-Primavera
25th Title

Head coach
István Kovács

== Sources ==
- Gyarmati Dezső: Aranykor (Hérodotosz Könyvkiadó és Értékesítő Bt., Budapest, 2002.)
