= 1983 Országos Bajnokság I (men's water polo) =

Water polo league season

OB I
- Season: 1983
- Champions: Vasas

1983 Országos Bajnokság I (men's water polo) was the 77th water polo championship in Hungary. There were fourteen teams who played two round match for the title.

== Final list ==
#	Team	M	W	D	L	G+	G−	P	Comments
1.	Vasas SC	24	24	0	0	344	211	48	
2.	BVSC	24	20	1	3	281	188	41	
3.	Szolnoki Vízügy	24	13	5	6	245	245	31	
4.	Bp. Honvéd	24	13	4	7	237	215	30	
5.	Újpesti Dózsa	24	11	3	10	220	207	25	
6.	Tungsram SC	24	9	5	10	240	241	23	
7.	Bp. Spartacus	24	8	5	11	232	253	21	
8.	Tatabányai Bányász	24	9	3	12	197	214	21	
9.	Eger SE	24	8	5	11	207	246	21	
10.	Szegedi EOL AK	24	7	2	15	203	235	16	
11.	Ferencvárosi TC	24	4	5	15	213	248	13	
12.	Medicor-OSC	24	3	5	16	205	241	11	
13.	KSI	24	4	3	17	215	295	11	
	Volán SC	-	-	-	-	-	-	-	deleted

* M: Matches W: Win D: Drawn L: Lost G+: Goals earned G−: Goals got P: Point

OB I 1983
Champions

Vasas
11th Title

== Sources ==
- Gyarmati Dezső: Aranykor (Hérodotosz Könyvkiadó és Értékesítő Bt., Budapest, 2002.)
