= 1937 Országos Bajnokság I (men's water polo) =

Water polo league season

OB I
- Season: 1937
- Champions: Újpest

1937 Országos Bajnokság I (men's water polo) was the 31st water polo championship in Hungary. There were nine teams who played one-round match for the title.

== Final list ==
#	Team	M	W	D	L	G+	G−	P
1.	Újpesti TE	8	7	0	1	45	15	14
2.	III. ker. TVE	8	6	1	1	26	14	13
3.	MTK	8	6	0	2	37	12	12
4.	MAC	8	5	1	2	37	13	11
5.	BSE	8	4	0	4	35	23	8
6.	Ferencvárosi TC	8	3	0	5	22	37	6
7.	Szegedi UE	8	2	0	6	15	36	4
8.	BEAC	8	1	1	6	20	37	3
9.	MUE	8	0	1	7	9	59	1

* M: Matches W: Win D: Drawn L: Lost G+: Goals earned G−: Goals got P: Point

OB I 1937
Champions

Újpest
8th Title

== 2. Class ==
1. MOVE Eger SE, 2. BBTE, 3. Tatabányai SC, 4. NSC.

== Sources ==
- Gyarmati Dezső: Aranykor (Hérodotosz Könyvkiadó és Értékesítő Bt., Budapest, 2002.)
- Magyar Sport Almanach 1937-1939
