= 1966 Országos Bajnokság I (men's water polo) =

Water polo league season

OB I
- Season: 1966
- Champions: BVSC

1966 Országos Bajnokság I (men's water polo) was the 60th water polo championship in Hungary. There were ten teams who played three-round match for the title.

== Final list ==
#	Team	M	W	D	L	G+	G−	P
1.	BVSC	27	18	6	3	159	106	42
2.	Ferencvárosi TC	27	16	7	4	152	96	39
3.	Újpesti Dózsa	27	16	7	4	144	94	39
4.	Csepel Autó	27	10	14	3	133	116	34
5.	Bp. Honvéd	27	11	9	7	135	111	31
6.	Szolnoki Dózsa	27	11	9	7	145	128	31
7.	Egri Dózsa	27	9	7	11	118	124	25
8.	OSC	27	3	6	18	97	126	12
9.	Vasas Izzó	27	5	2	20	94	173	12
10.	Budai Spartacus	27	2	1	24	125	228	5

* M: Matches W: Win D: Drawn L: Lost G+: Goals earned G−: Goals got P: Point

OB I 1966
Champions

BVSC
1st Title

== Sources ==
- Gyarmati Dezső: Aranykor (Hérodotosz Könyvkiadó és Értékesítő Bt., Budapest, 2002.)
