= 1930 Országos Bajnokság I (men's water polo) =

Water polo league season

OB I
- Season: 1930
- Champions: Újpest

1930 Országos Bajnokság I (men's water polo) was the 24th water polo championship in Hungary. There were nine teams who played one-round match for the title.

== Final list ==
#	Team	M	W	D	L	G+	G−	P
1.	Újpesti TE	8	7	0	1	65	15	14
2.	MAC	8	7	0	1	42	11	14
3.	III. ker. TVE	8	5	1	2	42	14	11
4.	MTK	8	5	1	2	34	15	11
5.	MOVE Eger SE	8	5	0	3	36	18	10
6.	Szegedi UE	8	3	0	5	22	35	6
7.	Ferencvárosi TC	8	1	1	6	7	39	3
8.	BSZKRT SE	8	1	0	7	6	50	2
9.	MUE	8	0	1	7	10	67	1

* M: Matches W: Win D: Drawn L: Lost G+: Goals earned G−: Goals got P: Point

OB I 1930
Champions

Újpest
1st Title

== 2. Class ==
Eastern Division: 1. NSC 10, 2. Orosházi TK 8, 3. Egri TE 6, 4. Debreceni EAC 4, 5. Postás SE 2, 6. Debreceni UE 0 points.

Western Division: 1. Pécsi AC 7, 2. Tatabányai SC 6, 3. MAFC 5, 4. Kaposvári Turul 2, 5. Pannonia UE Sopron 0 points.

Final: NSC-PAC 6:5

== Sources ==
- Gyarmati Dezső: Aranykor (Hérodotosz Könyvkiadó és Értékesítő Bt., Budapest, 2002.)
- Sport-évkönyv 1930
