= 1975 Országos Bajnokság I (men's water polo) =

Water polo league season

OB I
- Season: 1975
- Champions: Vasas

1975 Országos Bajnokság I (men's water polo) was the 69th water polo championship in Hungary. There were twelve teams who played two-round match for the title.

== Final list ==
#	Team	M	W	D	L	G+	G−	P
1.	Vasas SC	22	16	5	1	103	74	37
2.	OSC	22	12	9	1	119	90	33
3.	Ferencvárosi TC	22	13	4	5	104	87	30
4.	Újpesti Dózsa	22	10	6	6	92	77	26
5.	BVSC	22	10	5	7	97	86	25
6.	Bp. Honvéd	22	9	4	9	100	98	22
7.	Bp. Spartacus	22	7	8	7	86	88	22
8.	Szentesi Vízmű	22	3	10	9	84	94	16
9.	Szegedi EOL SC	22	3	9	10	68	89	15
10.	Szolnoki Vízügy-Dózsa	22	3	8	11	99	119	14
11.	Egri Dózsa	22	4	5	13	98	125	13
12.	Vasas Izzó	22	2	7	13	72	95	11

* M: Matches W: Win D: Drawn L: Lost G+: Goals earned G−: Goals got P: Point

OB I 1975
Champions

Vasas
4th Title

== Sources ==
- Gyarmati Dezső: Aranykor (Hérodotosz Könyvkiadó és Értékesítő Bt., Budapest, 2002.)
