= 1942 Országos Bajnokság I (men's water polo) =

Water polo league season

OB I
- Season: 1942
- Champions: Újpest

1942 Országos Bajnokság I (men's water polo) was the 36th water polo championship in Hungary. There were ten teams who played one-round match for the title.

== Final list ==
#	Team	M	W	D	L	G+	G−	P	Comments
1.	Újpesti TE	8	8	0	0	51	5	16	
2.	BSE	8	7	0	1	43	11	14	
3.	MAC	8	6	0	2	37	7	12	
4.	Ferencvárosi TC	8	5	0	3	43	22	10	
5.	Tatabányai SC	8	4	0	4	29	33	8	
6.	BEAC	8	3	0	5	16	27	6	
7.	MUE	8	1	0	7	12	34	2	
8.	Árpád MOVE Óbudai TE	8	0	1	7	7	56	1	
9.	Erzsébeti TC	8	1	1	6	6	49	1	deducted 2 points
10.	Nemzeti SC	-	-	-	-	-	-	-	deleted

* M: Matches W: Win D: Drawn L: Lost G+: Goals earned G−: Goals got P: Point

OB I 1942
Champions

Újpest
12th Title

== Sources ==
- Gyarmati Dezső: Aranykor (Hérodotosz Könyvkiadó és Értékesítő Bt., Budapest, 2002.)
