= 1995–96 Országos Bajnokság I (men's water polo) =

OB I
- Season: 1995–96
- Champions: BVSC

1995–96 Országos Bajnokság I (men's water polo) was the 90th water polo championship in Hungary.

== First stage ==
#	Team	M	W	D	L	G+	G−	P
1.	Vasas SC-Plaket	22	18	3	1	276	150	39
2.	Újpesti TE-Office & Home	22	18	1	3	295	176	37
3.	Ferencvárosi TC-Vitasport	22	16	2	4	226	194	34
4.	BVSC-Westel	22	14	1	7	266	179	29
5.	Szegedi VE	22	13	3	6	204	169	29
6.	Kordax Budapest SC (Tungsram SC)	22	13	2	7	181	150	28
7.	Kontavill-Szentesi SC	22	7	4	11	187	197	18
8.	Bp. Spartacus	22	6	3	13	170	238	15
9.	Szolnoki VSE	22	5	4	13	188	215	14
10.	ÚVMK Eger	22	3	5	14	193	243	11
11.	OSC	22	3	0	19	153	243	6
12.	Csanádi Árpád KSI	22	1	2	19	124	310	4

Championship Playoff

Pld - Played; W - Won; L - Lost; PF - Points for; PA - Points against; Diff - Difference; Pts - Points.

== Championship Playoff ==
Quarterfinals
3	Ferencvárosi TC-Vitasport	7	11	-
6	Kordax Budapest SC	10	9	-
4	BVSC-Westel	7	13	-
5	Szegedi VE	11	6	-

Semifinals
1	Vasas SC-Plaket	12	9	-
6	Kordax Budapest SC	9	10	-
2	Újpesti TE-Office & Home	12	5	-
4	BVSC-Westel	13	5	-

Final
1	Vasas SC-Plaket	6	8	-
4	BVSC-Westel	4	11	-

OB I 1995–96
Champions

BVSC
4th Title

== Sources ==
- Gyarmati Dezső: Aranykor (Hérodotosz Könyvkiadó és Értékesítő Bt., Budapest, 2002.)
