= 1932 Országos Bajnokság I (men's water polo) =

Water polo league season

OB I
- Season: 1932
- Champions: Újpest

1932 Országos Bajnokság I (men's water polo) was the 26th water polo championship in Hungary. There were nine teams whose divided into two groups because of the Olympics. Group A played for the championship, here were five teams who played one-round match for the title. Group B played avoid relegation, here were four teams who played two-round match. At the end of the regular season the Group A 5th place team and the Group B 1st team played placement match for fifth place.

== Final list ==
=== Group A ===
#	Team	M	W	D	L	G+	G−	P
1.	Újpesti TE	4	3	0	1	13	9	6
2.	MAC	4	2	1	1	11	8	5
3.	III. ker. TVE	4	2	1	1	8	6	5
4.	MTK	4	2	0	2	11	12	4
5.	MOVE Eger SE	4	0	0	4	4	12	0

* M: Matches W: Win D: Drawn L: Lost G+: Goals earned G−: Goals got P: Point

OB I 1932
Champions

Újpest
3rd Title

=== Group B ===
#	Team	M	W	D	L	G+	G−	P
1.	Szegedi UE	6	4	1	0	14	7	9
2.	Ferencvárosi TC	6	3	1	2	19	12	7
3.	BBTE	6	1	2	3	14	19	4
4.	BSZKRT SE	6	2	0	4	12	21	4

== Placement match ==
Fifth place game: MOVE Eger SE–Szegedi UE 4:2

== Sources ==
- Gyarmati Dezső: Aranykor (Hérodotosz Könyvkiadó és Értékesítő Bt., Budapest, 2002.)
- Magyar Sport Almanach 1931-1934
