= 1949 Országos Bajnokság I (men's water polo) =

Water polo league season

OB I
- Season: 1949
- Champions: Vasas

1949 Országos Bajnokság I (men's water polo) was the 43rd water polo championship in Hungary. There were ten teams who played one-round match for the title.

== Final list ==
#	Team	M	W	D	L	G+	G−	P
1.	Vasas SC	9	8	0	1	52	7	16
2.	Ferencvárosi TC	9	7	2	0	58	9	16
3.	Újpesti TE	9	7	1	1	51	10	15
4.	III. ker. TVE	9	5	1	3	29	14	11
5.	MTK	9	4	2	3	31	18	10
6.	Előre SE	9	4	1	4	25	22	9
7.	Egri SZTK	9	3	1	5	25	27	7
8.	Tatabányai SC	9	2	0	7	24	39	4
9.	Nemzeti SC	9	0	1	8	7	61	1
10.	Szentesi VSE	9	0	1	8	4	99	1

* M: Matches W: Win D: Drawn L: Lost G+: Goals earned G−: Goals got P: Point

OB I 1949
Champions

Vasas
2nd Title

== 2. Class ==
1. Bp. Lokomotív 10, 2. Csepeli MTK 8, 3. MTE 6, 4. KaSE 4, 5. BRE 2, 6. OTI 0 point.

== Sources ==
- Gyarmati Dezső: Aranykor (Hérodotosz Könyvkiadó és Értékesítő Bt., Budapest, 2002.)
