= Mihály Bozsi =

Hungarian water polo player (1911–1984)

Personal information
- Born: 2 March 1911 Budapest, Austria-Hungary
- Died: 5 May 1984 (aged 73) Budapest, Hungary

Sport
- Sport: Water polo
Medal record
Representing Hungary
Olympic Games
Gold medal – first place	1936 Berlin	Team competition

Mihály Bozsi (2 March 1911 – 5 May 1984) was a Hungarian water polo player who competed in the 1936 Summer Olympics. He was born and died in Budapest.

Bozsi was part of the Hungarian team which won the gold medal. He played six matches including the final.

== See also ==
- Hungary men's Olympic water polo team records and statistics
- List of Olympic champions in men's water polo
- List of Olympic medalists in water polo (men)
