= 1935 Országos Bajnokság I (men's water polo) =

Water polo league season

OB I
- Season: 1935
- Champions: Újpest

1935 Országos Bajnokság I (men's water polo) was the 29th water polo championship in Hungary. There were eight teams who played one-round match for the title.

== Final list ==
#	Team	M	W	D	L	G+	G−	P
1.	Újpesti TE	7	6	0	1	39	8	12
2.	MAC	7	5	0	2	17	9	10
3.	MTK	7	4	1	2	23	15	9
4.	III. ker. TVE	7	3	2	2	19	11	8
5.	BEAC	7	3	1	3	23	25	7
6.	Szegedi UE	7	3	0	4	25	23	6
7.	Ferencvárosi TC	7	2	0	5	9	31	4
8.	MOVE Eger SE	7	0	0	7	7	40	0

* M: Matches W: Win D: Drawn L: Lost G+: Goals earned G−: Goals got P: Point

OB I 1935
Champions

Újpest
6th Title

== 2. Class ==
Budapest: 1. BSE 16, 2. NSC 10, 3. MUE 7, 4. BBTE 7, 5. VAC 0 point.

Eastern Division: Szolnoki MÁV 10, 2. Orosházi UE 9, 3. Egri TE 5, 4. Jászapáti Összetartás SE 0 point.

Western Division: 1. Tatabányai SC 6, 2. Győri UE 5, 3. Pécsi AC 1 point.

Final: 1. BSE, 2. Tatabányai SC, 3. Szolnoki MÁV.

== Sources ==
- Gyarmati Dezső: Aranykor (Hérodotosz Könyvkiadó és Értékesítő Bt., Budapest, 2002.)
- Magyar Sport Almanach 1935
