= 1984–85 Országos Bajnokság I (men's water polo) =

Water polo league season

OB I
- Season: 1984–85
- Champions: BVSC (2nd title)
- Relegated: KSI SE

1984–85 Országos Bajnokság I (men's water polo) was the 79th water polo championship in Hungary. There were fourteen teams who played two-round match for the title.

== Final list ==
#	Team	M	W	D	L	G+	G−	P
1.	BVSC	26	20	3	3	265	206	43
2.	Vasas SC	26	20	1	5	306	219	41
3.	Szolnoki Vízügy	26	15	5	6	255	227	35
4.	Újpesti Dózsa	26	15	3	8	251	218	33
5.	Eger SE	26	15	1	10	241	233	31
6.	Tungsram SC	26	14	3	9	255	234	31
7.	Ferencvárosi TC	26	14	3	9	259	245	31
8.	Bp. Honvéd	26	11	6	9	238	224	28
9.	Szentesi Vízmű	26	9	3	14	246	244	21
10.	Tatabányai Bányász	26	9	3	14	219	241	21
11.	Bp. Spartacus	26	7	3	16	250	278	17
12.	Medicor-OSC	26	5	6	15	228	249	16
13.	Szegedi EOL AK	26	7	1	18	244	291	15
14.	KSI	26	0	1	25	202	350	1

* M: Matches W: Win D: Drawn L: Lost G+: Goals earned G−: Goals got P: Point

OB I 1984–85
Champions

BVSC
2nd Title

== Sources ==
- Gyarmati Dezső: Aranykor (Hérodotosz Könyvkiadó és Értékesítő Bt., Budapest, 2002.)
