= 2008 Magyar Kupa (men's water polo) =

Water polo tournament season

Tournament details
- Country: Hungary
- Teams: 15

Final positions
- Champions: ZF-Eger
- Runners-up: TEVA-VasasPlaket

The 2008 Magyar Kupa was the 82nd edition of the Magyar Kupa.

== Quarter-finals ==
Quarter-final matches were played on 27 and 28 September 2008.

Team 1	Agg.	Team 2	1st leg	2nd leg
ZF-Eger (I)	33–20	Bodrogi Bau-Szentesi VK (I)	20–11	13–9
TEVA-VasasPlaket (I)	21–17	Aprilia FTC-Fisher Klíma (I)	8–7	13–10
UNIQA-UTE (I)	16–15	Szeged Beton VE (I)	7–8	9–7
Domino-Honvéd (I)	25–16	Pécsi Vízmű PVSK-Füszért (I)	14–9	11–7

== Final four ==
The final four will be held on 29 and 30 November 2008 at the Bitskey Aladár Uszoda in Eger.

Semifinals
29 November, 17:30
UNIQA-UTE	6
ZF-Eger	13
29 November, 19:00
TEVA-VasasPlaket (a.e.t.)	10
Domino Honvéd	9

Final
30 November, 12:30
ZF-Eger (a.e.t.)	9
TEVA-VasasPlaket	8

=== Semi-finals ===
29 November; 17:30	Report	UNIQA-UTE	6–13	ZF-Eger	Bitskey Aladár uszoda, Eger; Referees: dr. Fekete, Petik
29 November; 17:30	Report	Score by quarters: 1–3, 2–4, 1–2, 2–4			Bitskey Aladár uszoda, Eger; Referees: dr. Fekete, Petik
29 November; 17:30	Report	Létay, Suti 2	Goals	Bárány, Varga II 3	Bitskey Aladár uszoda, Eger; Referees: dr. Fekete, Petik

29 November; 19:00	Report	TEVA-VasasPlaket	10–9 (OT)	Domino Honvéd	Bitskey Aladár uszoda, Eger; Referees: ifj. Juhász, Kun
29 November; 19:00	Report	Score by quarters: 3–2, 2–1, 2–0, 1–5 OT: 1–0, 1–1			Bitskey Aladár uszoda, Eger; Referees: ifj. Juhász, Kun
29 November; 19:00	Report	three players 2	Goals	Szívós 3	Bitskey Aladár uszoda, Eger; Referees: ifj. Juhász, Kun

=== Final ===
30 November; 12:30	Report	ZF-Eger	9–8 (OT)	TEVA-VasasPlaket	Bitskey Aladár uszoda, Eger; Referees: Kiszelly, Székely
30 November; 12:30	Report	Score by quarters: 3–2, 2–1, 1–3, 1–1 OT: 2–0, 0–1			Bitskey Aladár uszoda, Eger; Referees: Kiszelly, Székely
30 November; 12:30	Report	three players 2	Goals	Dé. Varga 5	Bitskey Aladár uszoda, Eger; Referees: Kiszelly, Székely

2008 Magyar Kupa
Winner
ZF-Eger
3rd Title

1 Zoltán Szécsi, 2 Ádám Decker, 3 Balázs Erdélyi, 4 Balázs Nyéki, 5 Attila Bárány, 6 Csaba Kiss, 7 Gábor Hegedűs, 8 Zsolt Varga, 9 Aaron Feltham, 10 Szabolcs Binder, 11 Erik Bundschuch, 12 Balázs Hárai, 13 Péter Biros (c), 14 Attila Decker
Head coach
György Gerendás

== See also ==
- 2008–09 Országos Bajnokság I
