= 2012 Magyar Kupa (men's water polo) =

Water polo tournament season

Tournament details
- Country: Hungary
- Teams: 17

Final positions
- Champions: A-HÍD Szeged
- Runner-up: Szolnoki Dózsa-KÖZGÉP

The 2012 Magyar Kupa, known as (Hungarian: Theodora Férfi Magyar Kupa for sponsorship reasons), is the 86th edition of the tournament.

== Quarter-finals ==
Quarter-final matches were played on 29 and 30 September 2012.

| Team 1 | Agg. | Team 2 | 1st leg | 2nd leg |
|---|---|---|---|---|
| ZF-Eger (I) | 13–14 | Szolnoki Dózsa-KÖZGÉP (I) | 8–9 | 5–5 |
| TEVA-Vasas (I) | 18–13 | Grupama Honvéd (I) | 11–5 | 7–8 |
| Széchenyi Bank-FTC (I) | 8–19 | A-HÍD Szeged (I) | 5–8 | 3–11 |
| Debrecen (I) | w/o | Valdor Szentes (I) | – | – |

== Final four ==
The final four will be held on 10 and 11 November 2012 at the Komjádi Béla Sportuszoda in Budapest.

Semifinals
10 November, 16:30
Debrecen | 3
Szolnoki Dózsa-KÖZGÉP | 5
10 November, 18:15
A-HÍD Szeged | 10
TEVA-Vasas | 9

Final
11 November, 12:20
Szolnoki Dózsa-KÖZGÉP | 8
A-HÍD Szeged (a.e.t.) | 9

=== Semi-finals ===
| 10 November; 16:30 | Report | Debrecen | 3–5 | Szolnoki Dózsa-KÖZGÉP | Komjádi Béla Sportuszoda, Budapest; Referees: Székely, Kun |
| 10 November; 16:30 | Report | Score by quarters: 3–2, 0–0, 0–3, 0–0 | | | Komjádi Béla Sportuszoda, Budapest; Referees: Székely, Kun |
| 10 November; 16:30 | Report | three players 1 | Goals | Pásztor 3 | Komjádi Béla Sportuszoda, Budapest; Referees: Székely, Kun |

| 10 November; 18:15 | Report | A-HÍD Szeged | 10–9 | TEVA-Vasas | Komjádi Béla Sportuszoda, Budapest; Referees: Németh, Vojvoda |
| 10 November; 18:15 | Report | Score by quarters: 3–3, 2–3, 2–2, 3–1 | | | Komjádi Béla Sportuszoda, Budapest; Referees: Németh, Vojvoda |
| 10 November; 18:15 | Report | Szívós 4 | Goals | Vámos 4 | Komjádi Béla Sportuszoda, Budapest; Referees: Németh, Vojvoda |

=== Final ===
| 11 November; 12:20 | Report | Szolnoki Dózsa-KÖZGÉP | 8–9 | A-HÍD Szeged | Komjádi Béla Sportuszoda, Budapest; Referees: Vogel, ifj. Juhász |
| 11 November; 12:20 | Report | Score by quarters: 1–2, 3–3, 2–1, 1–1 OT: 1–1, 0–1 | | | Komjádi Béla Sportuszoda, Budapest; Referees: Vogel, ifj. Juhász |
| 11 November; 12:20 | Report | three players 2 | Goals | dr. Molnár 3 | Komjádi Béla Sportuszoda, Budapest; Referees: Vogel, ifj. Juhász |

2012 Magyar Kupa
Winner

A-HÍD Szeged
2nd Title

1 László Baksa, 2 Ádám Decker, 3 Aljoša Kunac, 4 Péter Varga, 5 Joseph Kayes, 6 Csaba Kiss, 7 Gábor Hegedűs, 8 Márton Szívós, 9 dr. Tamás Molnár, 10 Zsolt Juhász, 11 Aaron Younger, 12 Balázs Somogyi, 13 Béla Török, 14 Dávid Molnár
Head coach
dr. Balázs Vincze

== See also ==
- 2012–13 Országos Bajnokság I
