= 2019 Magyar Kupa (men's water polo) =

Water polo tournament season

Hungarian Cup
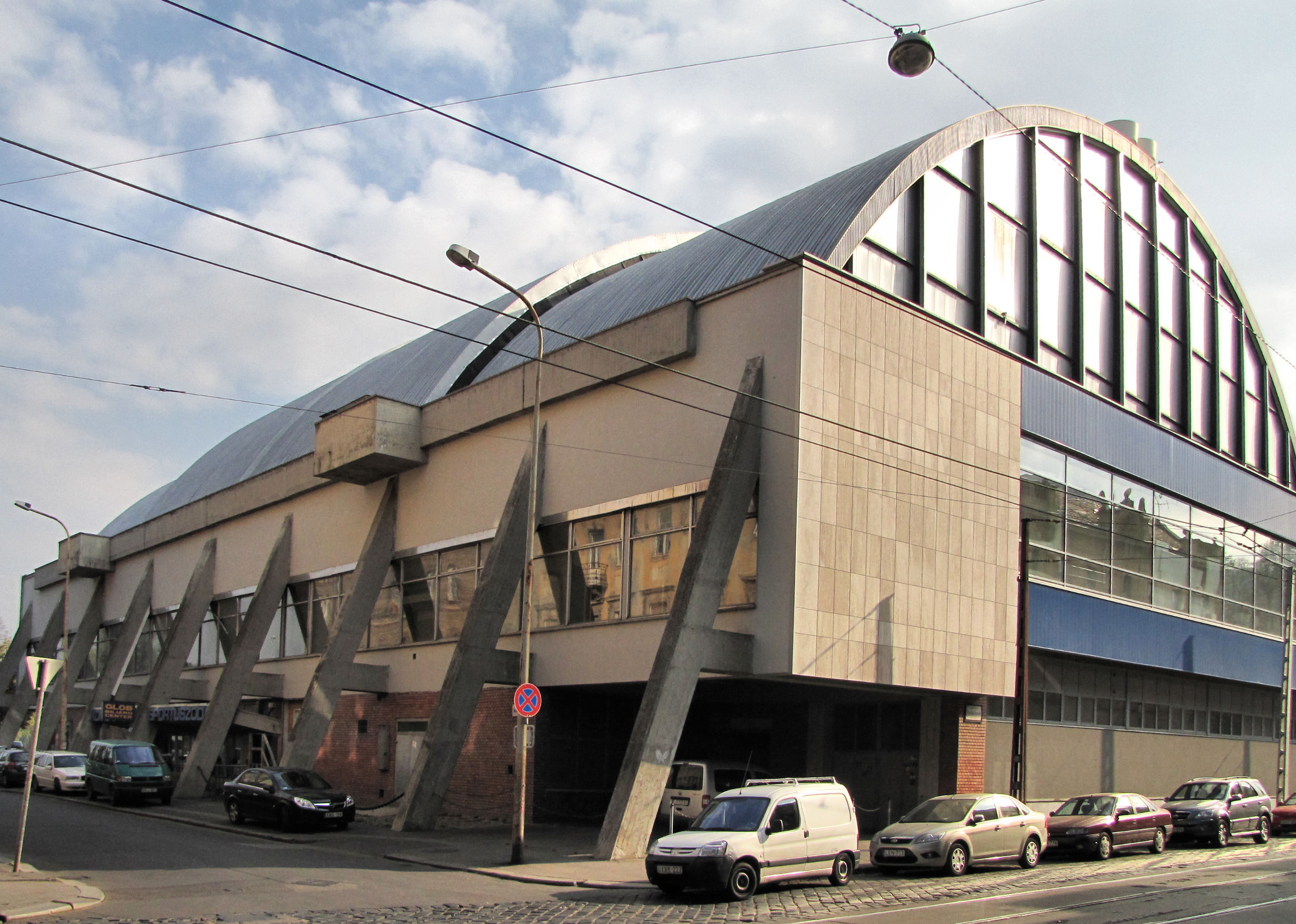
- The Császár-Komjádi Swimming Stadium hosted the Final4.

Tournament details
- Country: Hungary
- Date: 1 September – 8 December
- Teams: 17

Final positions
- Champions: Ferencváros (19th title)
- Runner-up: OSC

Tournament statistics
- Top goal scorer(s): (Hungary) Gyula Tóth (13 goals)

The 2019 Magyar Kupa (known as the BENU Férfi Magyar Kupa for sponsorship reasons), was the 93rd edition of the tournament.

== Participating clubs ==
The following 17 teams qualified for the competition:

Országos Bajnokság I 15 clubs of the 2018–19 season
| Ferencváros; OSC; Szolnok; Eger | Miskolc; BVSC; Bp. Honvéd; Debrecen | Szentes; Pécsi VSK; Tatabánya; AVUS | UVSE; Kaposvár; Vasas |
Országos Bajnokság I/B the first and second club of the 2017–18 season
| Szeged | Kanizsa | | |

== Schedule ==
The rounds of the 2019 competition are scheduled as follows:

| Round | Draw date and time | Matches |
|---|---|---|
| Preliminary round | 12 August 2019 | 1–2 September 2019 |
| Quarter-finals | 30 September 2019 | 25–26 October 2019 |
| Final four | ? November 2019 | 7–8 December 2019 |

== Preliminary round ==
The preliminary round ties were scheduled for 1–2 September 2019.

=== Group A ===
Tournament was played at Városi Sportuszoda, Szentes.

| Team | Pld | W | D | L | GF | GA | GD | Pts |
|---|---|---|---|---|---|---|---|---|
| UVSE Hunguest Hotels | 3 | 2 | 1 | 0 | 31 | 25 | +6 | 7 |
| Metalcom-Szentes | 3 | 1 | 2 | 0 | 32 | 29 | +3 | 5 |
| BVSC-Zugló MKB Euroleasing | 3 | 1 | 1 | 1 | 24 | 25 | −1 | 4 |
| AVUS Szombathely | 3 | 0 | 0 | 3 | 29 | 37 | −8 | 0 |

=== Group B ===
Tournament was played at Abay Nemes Oszkár Sportuszoda, Pécs.

| Team | Pld | W | D | L | GF | GA | GD | Pts |
|---|---|---|---|---|---|---|---|---|
| PVSK-Mecsek Füszért | 3 | 3 | 0 | 0 | 36 | 21 | +15 | 9 |
| Tatabányai VSE | 3 | 2 | 0 | 1 | 28 | 26 | +2 | 6 |
| Debrecen | 3 | 1 | 0 | 2 | 26 | 32 | −6 | 3 |
| Kanizsa VSE | 3 | 0 | 0 | 3 | 20 | 31 | −11 | 0 |

=== Group C ===
Tournament was played at Csik Ferenc Versenyuszoda, Kaposvár.

| Team | Pld | W | D | L | GF | GA | GD | Pts |
|---|---|---|---|---|---|---|---|---|
| Budapesti Honvéd SE | 3 | 2 | 1 | 0 | 43 | 32 | +11 | 7 |
| Kaposvári VK | 3 | 1 | 1 | 1 | 37 | 40 | −3 | 4 |
| VasasPlaket | 3 | 0 | 3 | 0 | 36 | 36 | 0 | 3 |
| Szegedi VE | 3 | 0 | 1 | 2 | 35 | 43 | −8 | 1 |

== Quarter-finals ==
The quarter-final matches were played on 25 and 26 October 2019.

| Team 1 | Agg. | Team 2 | 1st leg | 2nd leg |
|---|---|---|---|---|
| Szolnoki Dózsa (I) | 21–19 | ZF-Eger (I) | 11–11 | 10–8 |
| FTC-Telekom (I) | 32–16 | UVSE Hunguest Hotels (I) | 16–8 | 16–8 |
| PVSK-Mecsek Füszért (I) | 25–35 | PannErgy-Miskolci VLC (I) | 12–16 | 9–19 |
| Budapesti Honvéd SE (I) | 10–30 | A-HÍD OSC Újbuda (I) | 5–14 | 5–16 |

== Final four ==
The final four was held on 7 and 8 December 2019 at the Császár-Komjádi Swimming Stadium in Budapest, II. ker.

Semi-finals
7 December, 19:00
A-HÍD OSC Újbuda | 11
PannErgy-Miskolci VLC | 9
7 December, 17:30
FTC-Telekom | 13
Szolnoki Dózsa | 8

Final
8 December, 16:00
A-HÍD OSC Újbuda | 7
FTC-Telekom | 8

=== Semi-finals ===
| 7 December 2019; 19:00 (CET) | Report | A-HÍD OSC Újbuda | 11–9 | PannErgy-Miskolci VLC | Komjádi Béla Sportuszoda, Budapest; Attendance: 800; Referees: Marjay, Vogel |
| 7 December 2019; 19:00 (CET) | Report | Score by quarters: 3–1, 3–3, 3–1, 2–4 | | | Komjádi Béla Sportuszoda, Budapest; Attendance: 800; Referees: Marjay, Vogel |
| 7 December 2019; 19:00 (CET) | Report | Erdélyi, Manhercz 3 | Goals | Nagy, Mišić 3 | Komjádi Béla Sportuszoda, Budapest; Attendance: 800; Referees: Marjay, Vogel |

| 7 December 2019; 17:30 (CET) | Report | FTC-Telekom | 13–8 | Szolnoki Dózsa | Komjádi Béla Sportuszoda, Budapest; Attendance: 1,000; Referees: Kun, Tóth |
| 7 December 2019; 17:30 (CET) | Report | Score by quarters: 5–0, 3–1, 1–4, 4–3 | | | Komjádi Béla Sportuszoda, Budapest; Attendance: 1,000; Referees: Kun, Tóth |
| 7 December 2019; 17:30 (CET) | Report | Varga, Fountoulis 3 | Goals | Várnai, Subotić 2 | Komjádi Béla Sportuszoda, Budapest; Attendance: 1,000; Referees: Kun, Tóth |

=== Final ===
| 8 December 2019; 16:00 (CET) | Report | A-HÍD OSC Újbuda | 7–8 | FTC-Telekom | Komjádi Béla Sportuszoda, Budapest; Attendance: 1,400; Referees: Rubos, Füzesi |
| 8 December 2019; 16:00 (CET) | Report | Score by quarters: 3–2, 2–1, 1–2, 1–3 | | | Komjádi Béla Sportuszoda, Budapest; Attendance: 1,400; Referees: Rubos, Füzesi |
| 8 December 2019; 16:00 (CET) | Report | Hárai, Manhercz 2 | Goals | Jakšić 3 | Komjádi Béla Sportuszoda, Budapest; Attendance: 1,400; Referees: Rubos, Füzesi |

==== Final standings ====
| | Team |
|---|---|
| | FTC-Telekom Waterpolo |
| Silver medal | A-HÍD OSC Újbuda |
| Bronze medal | PannErgy-Miskolci VLC |
| Bronze medal | Szolnoki Dózsa |

2019 Magyar Kupa
Winner

Ferencvároi TC
19th title

Gárdonyi – S. Mitrović, Dé. Varga (c), Sedlmayer, Mezei, Vámos, Jakšić
Reserves: Younger, Német, Kállay, Sz. Jansik, Gór-Nagy, Pohl, Vogel (goalkeeper)
Head coach: Zsolt Varga, Technical Director: György Gerendás

== See also ==
- 2019–20 Országos Bajnokság I (National Championship of Hungary)
- 2019 Szuperkupa (Super Cup of Hungary)
