= 2018 Magyar Kupa (men's water polo) =

Water polo tournament season

Hungarian Cup
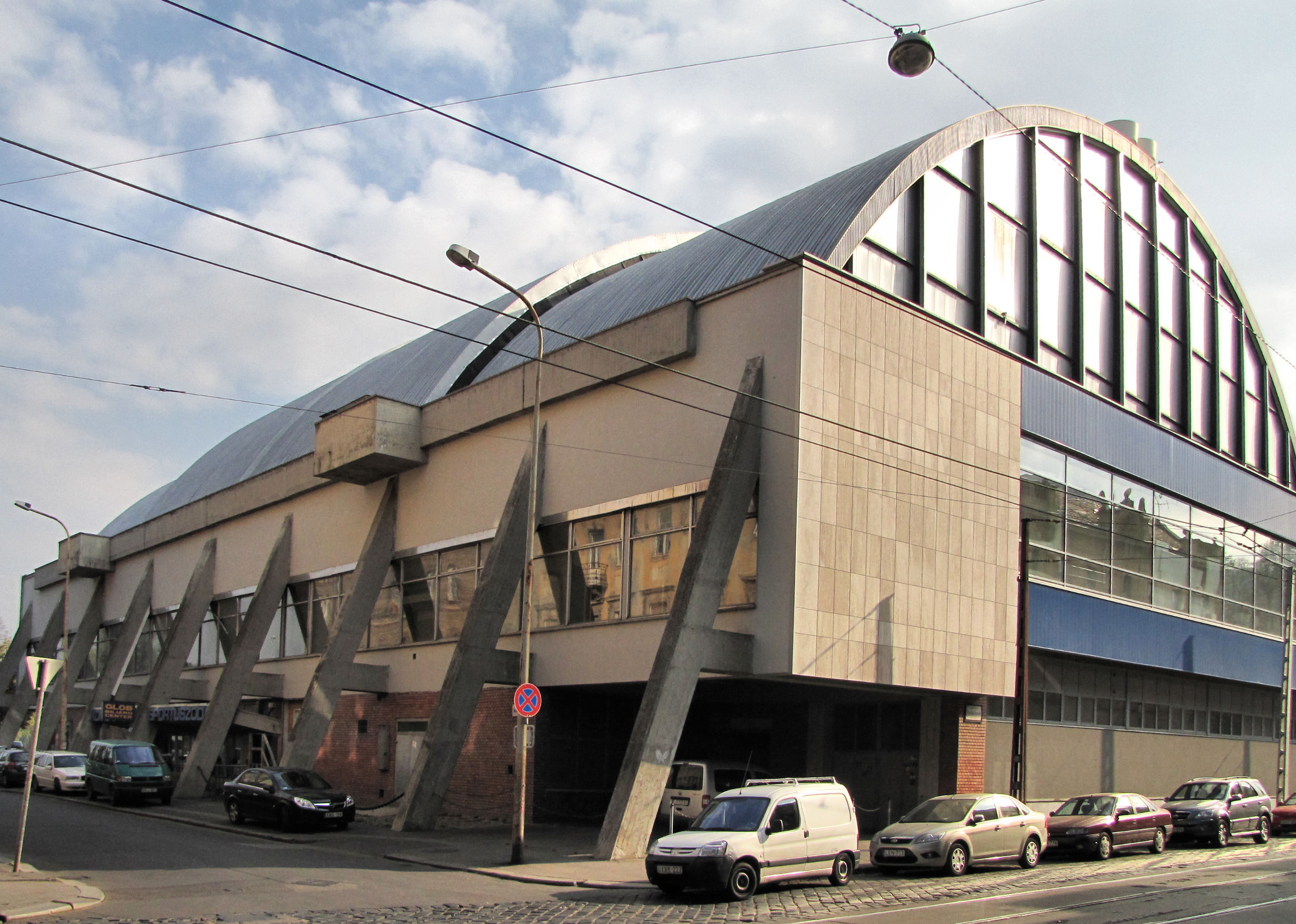
- The Császár-Komjádi Swimming Stadium hosted the Final4.

Tournament details
- Country: Hungary
- Date: 26 October – 16 December
- Teams: 17

Final positions
- Champions: Ferencváros (18th title)
- Runners-up: Miskolc

Tournament statistics
- Top goal scorer(s): (Hungary) Dénes Varga (23 goals)

The 2018 Magyar Kupa (known as the BENU Férfi Magyar Kupa for sponsorship reasons), was the 92nd edition of the tournament.

== Participating clubs ==
The following 17 teams qualified for the competition:

Országos Bajnokság I the 16 clubs of the 2017–18 season
Ferencváros; Szolnok; Eger; OSC	BVSC; Miskolc; Bp. Honvéd; Debrecen	Kaposvár; Pécsi VSK; Szentes; Vasas	AVUS; Tatabánya; UVSE; Szeged
Országos Bajnokság I/B the first club of the 2017–18 season
KSI			

== Schedule ==
The rounds of the 2018 competition are scheduled as follows:

Round	Draw date and time	Matches
Preliminary round	17 October 2018	27–28 October 2018
Quarter-finals	5 November 2018	17–18 November 2018
Final four	26 November 2018	15–16 December 2018

== Preliminary round ==
The preliminary round ties were scheduled for 26–28 October 2018.

Number of teams per tier entering this round
Országos Bajnokság I	Országos Bajnokság I/B	Total
16 / 16	1 / 19	17 / 17

=== Group A ===
Tournament was played at Abay Nemes Oszkár Sportuszoda, Pécs.

Team	Pld	W	D	L	GF	GA	GD	Pts
A-HÍD OSC Újbuda	3	3	0	0	51	18	+33	9
BVSC-Zugló MKB Euroleasing	3	2	0	1	28	24	+4	6
PVSK-Mecsek Füszért	3	1	0	2	25	32	−7	3
UVSE	3	0	0	3	15	45	−30	0

=== Group B ===
Tournament was played at Tiszaligeti uszoda (Vizilabda Aréna), Szolnok.

Team	Pld	W	D	L	GF	GA	GD	Pts
Szolnoki Dózsa	3	3	0	0	31	15	+16	9
Budapesti Honvéd SE	3	2	0	1	34	27	+7	6
Kaposvári VK	3	1	0	2	27	38	−11	3
VasasPlaket	3	0	0	3	16	28	−12	0

=== Group C ===
Tournament was played at Bitskey Aladár uszoda, Eger.

Team	Pld	W	D	L	GF	GA	GD	Pts
ZF-Eger	4	4	0	0	64	31	+33	12
Debrecen	4	2	1	1	44	41	+3	7
AVUS	4	2	0	2	40	42	−2	6
Metalcom-Szentes	4	1	1	2	41	49	−8	4
KSI SE	4	0	0	4	27	53	−26	0

=== Group D ===
Tournament was played at Szegedi Sportuszoda, Szeged.

Team	Pld	W	D	L	GF	GA	GD	Pts
FTC-Telekom	3	3	0	0	46	22	+24	9
PannErgy-Miskolci VLC	3	2	0	3	40	29	+11	6
Szegedi VE	3	1	0	2	21	38	−17	3
Tatabányai VSE	3	0	0	3	22	40	−18	0

== Quarter-finals ==
The quarter-final matches were played on 17 and 18 November 2018.

Team 1	Agg.	Team 2	1st leg	2nd leg
Budapesti Honvéd SE (I)	12–19	BVSC-Zugló MKB Euroleasing (I)	5–11	7–8
Debrecen (I)	10–26	PannErgy-Miskolci VLC (I)	5–12	5–14
Szolnoki Dózsa (I)	11–19	A-HÍD OSC Újbuda (I)	4–12	7–7
ZF-Eger (I)	17–27	FTC-Telekom (I)	9–12	8–15

== Final four ==
The final four was held on 15 and 16 December 2018 at the Császár-Komjádi Swimming Stadium in Budapest, II. ker.

Semi-finals
15 December, 14:00
A-HÍD OSC Újbuda	7
FTC-Telekom	11
15 December, 15:45
BVSC-Zugló MKB Euroleasing	8
PannErgy-Miskolci VLC	9

Final
16 December, 16:00
FTC-Telekom	10
PannErgy-Miskolci VLC	4

=== Semi-finals ===
15 December 2018; 14:00 (CET)	Report	A-HÍD OSC Újbuda	7–11	FTC-Telekom	Komjádi Béla Sportuszoda, Budapest; Attendance: 1,200; Referees: Fodor, Petik
15 December 2018; 14:00 (CET)	Report	Score by quarters: 3–2, 1–5, 2–3, 1–1			Komjádi Béla Sportuszoda, Budapest; Attendance: 1,200; Referees: Fodor, Petik
15 December 2018; 14:00 (CET)	Report	Manhercz, Ranđelović 2	Goals	Dé. Varga 5	Komjádi Béla Sportuszoda, Budapest; Attendance: 1,200; Referees: Fodor, Petik

15 December 2018; 15:45 (CET)	Report	BVSC-Zugló MKB Euroleasing	8–9	PannErgy-Miskolci VLC	Komjádi Béla Sportuszoda, Budapest; Attendance: 800; Referees: Vogel, Marnitz
15 December 2018; 15:45 (CET)	Report	Score by quarters: 2–2, 3–3, 2–3, 1–1			Komjádi Béla Sportuszoda, Budapest; Attendance: 800; Referees: Vogel, Marnitz
15 December 2018; 15:45 (CET)	Report	Török, Létay 2	Goals	Stojanović 4	Komjádi Béla Sportuszoda, Budapest; Attendance: 800; Referees: Vogel, Marnitz

=== Final ===
16 December 2018; 16:00 (CET)	Report	FTC-Telekom	10–4	PannErgy-Miskolci VLC	Komjádi Béla Sportuszoda, Budapest; Attendance: 1,400; Referees: Kun, Csanádi
16 December 2018; 16:00 (CET)	Report	Score by quarters: 4–2, 2–1, 2–1, 2–0			Komjádi Béla Sportuszoda, Budapest; Attendance: 1,400; Referees: Kun, Csanádi
16 December 2018; 16:00 (CET)	Report	Dé. Varga 4	Goals	Bowen 2	Komjádi Béla Sportuszoda, Budapest; Attendance: 1,400; Referees: Kun, Csanádi

==== Final standings ====
	Team
	FTC-Telekom Waterpolo
Silver medal	PannErgy-Miskolci VLC
Bronze medal	A-HÍD OSC Újbuda
Bronze medal	BVSC-Zugló MKB Euroleasing

2018 Magyar Kupa
Winner

Ferencvároi TC
18th title

Gárdonyi – S. Mitrović, Dé. Varga (c), Sedlmayer, Mezei, Vámos, Jakšić
Reserves: Younger, Német, Kállay, Sz. Jansik, Gór-Nagy, Pohl, Vogel (goalkeeper)
Head coach: Zsolt Varga, Technical Director: György Gerendás

== See also ==
- 2018–19 Országos Bajnokság I (National Championship of Hungary)
- 2018 Szuperkupa (Super Cup of Hungary)
