= 2011 Magyar Kupa (men's water polo) =

Water polo tournament season

Tournament details
- Country: Hungary
- Teams: 16

Final positions
- Champions: Szeged Beton VE
- Runners-up: Grupama Honvéd

Tournament statistics
- Top goal scorer(s): (Hungary) dr. Tamás Molnár (19 goals)

The 2011 Magyar Kupa, known as (Hungarian: Theodora Férfi Magyar Kupa for sponsorship reasons), is the 85th edition of the tournament.

== Quarter-finals ==
Quarter-final matches were played on 4 and 5 November 2011.

Team 1	Agg.	Team 2	1st leg	2nd leg
BVSC-Zugló (I)	16–27	ZF-Eger (I)	6–15	10–12
Grupama Honvéd (I)	15–14	TEVA-VasasPlaket (I)	8–5	7–9
PVSK-Füszért (I)	11–31	Szolnoki Dózsa-KÖZGÉP (I)	7–13	4–18
Szeged Beton VE (I)	32–14	FTC-Fisher Klíma (I)	13–5	19–9

== Final four ==
The final four will be held on 12 and 13 November 2011 at the Szőnyi úti uszoda in Budapest.

Semifinals
12 November, 15:15
ZF-Eger	8
Grupama Honvéd (a.e.t.)	9
12 November, 16:45
Szolnoki Dózsa-KÖZGÉP	4
Szeged Beton VE	8

Final
13 November, 11:40
Grupama Honvéd	8
Szeged Beton VE	9

=== Semi-finals ===
12 November; 15:15	Report	ZF-Eger	8–9 (OT)	Grupama Honvéd	Szőnyi úti uszoda, Budapest; Referees: Székely, Dodog
12 November; 15:15	Report	Score by quarters: 2–3, 3–1, 2–2, 1–2 OT: 0–1, 0–0			Szőnyi úti uszoda, Budapest; Referees: Székely, Dodog
12 November; 15:15	Report	Varga II, Seman 2	Goals	Salamon 5	Szőnyi úti uszoda, Budapest; Referees: Székely, Dodog

12 November; 16:45	Report	Szolnoki Dózsa-KÖZGÉP	4–8	Szeged Beton VE	Szőnyi úti uszoda, Budapest; Referees: Németh, Vojvoda
12 November; 16:45	Report	Score by quarters: 2–3, 2–2, 0–1, 0–2			Szőnyi úti uszoda, Budapest; Referees: Németh, Vojvoda
12 November; 16:45	Report	four players 1	Goals	Kiss 3	Szőnyi úti uszoda, Budapest; Referees: Németh, Vojvoda

=== Final ===
13 November; 11:40	Report	Grupama Honvéd	8–9	Szeged Beton VE	Szőnyi úti uszoda, Budapest; Referees: Vogel, ifj. Juhász
13 November; 11:40	Report	Score by quarters: 1–1, 3–2, 3–3, 1–3			Szőnyi úti uszoda, Budapest; Referees: Vogel, ifj. Juhász
13 November; 11:40	Report	three players 2	Goals	Younger 2	Szőnyi úti uszoda, Budapest; Referees: Vogel, ifj. Juhász

2011 Magyar Kupa
Winner

Szeged Beton VE
1st Title

1 László Baksa, 2 Béla Török, 3 Gábor Turzai, 4 Péter Varga, 5 Joseph Kayes, 6 Csaba Kiss, 7 Gábor Hegedűs, 8 Aljoša Kunac, 9 dr. Tamás Molnár, 10 Zsolt Juhász, 11 Aaron Younger, 12 Balázs Somogyi, 13 Gergő Bálint, 14 Dávid Molnár
Head coach
dr. Balázs Vincze

== See also ==
- 2011–12 Országos Bajnokság I
