= 2013 Magyar Kupa (men's water polo) =

Water polo tournament season

Tournament details
- Country: Hungary
- Teams: 15

Final positions
- Champions: Diapolo Szeged
- Runner-up: Szolnoki Dózsa-KÖZGÉP

The 2013 Magyar Kupa, known as (Hungarian: Theodora Férfi Magyar Kupa for sponsorship reasons), is the 87th edition of the tournament.

== Quarter-finals ==
Quarter-final matches were played on 14 and 15 September 2013.

Team 1	Agg.	Team 2	1st leg	2nd leg
Széchenyi Bank-FTC (I)	19–23	TEVA-Vasas (I)	9–9	10–14
RacioNet Honvéd (I)	11–15	Kaposvár (I)	9–9	2–6
Debrecen (I)	11–25	Szolnoki Dózsa-KÖZGÉP (I)	6–15	5–10
ZF-Eger (I)	17–19	Diapolo Szeged (I)	11–10	6–9

== Final four ==
The final four will be held on 16 and 17 November 2013 at the Vizilabda Aréna (Tiszaligeti uszoda) in Szolnok.

Semifinals
16 November, 14:45
Diapolo Szeged	15
Kaposvár	4
16 November, 16:30
Szolnoki Dózsa-KÖZGÉP	11
TEVA-Vasas	8

Final
17 November, 16:15
Diapolo Szeged	9
Szolnoki Dózsa-KÖZGÉP	5

=== Semi-finals ===
16 November; 14:45	Report	Diapolo Szeged	15–4	Kaposvár	Tiszaligeti uszoda, Szolnok; Referees: Marjay, Dodog
16 November; 14:45	Report	Score by quarters: 4–1, 4–2, 2–0, 5–1			Tiszaligeti uszoda, Szolnok; Referees: Marjay, Dodog
16 November; 14:45	Report	M. Tóth 5	Goals	four players 1	Tiszaligeti uszoda, Szolnok; Referees: Marjay, Dodog

16 November; 16:30	Report	Szolnoki Dózsa-KÖZGÉP	11–8	TEVA-Vasas	Tiszaligeti uszoda, Szolnok; Referees: Vogel, Németh
16 November; 16:30	Report	Score by quarters: 3–1, 3–2, 1–1, 4–4			Tiszaligeti uszoda, Szolnok; Referees: Vogel, Németh
16 November; 16:30	Report	Vámos 3	Goals	Csapó, Brguljan 4	Tiszaligeti uszoda, Szolnok; Referees: Vogel, Németh

=== Final ===
17 November; 16:15	Report	Diapolo Szeged	9–5	Szolnoki Dózsa-KÖZGÉP	Tiszaligeti uszoda, Szolnok; Attendance: 1,000; Referees: Székely, dr. Marosvári
17 November; 16:15	Report	Score by quarters: 5–1, 2–1, 1–1, 1–2			Tiszaligeti uszoda, Szolnok; Attendance: 1,000; Referees: Székely, dr. Marosvári
17 November; 16:15	Report	Cs. Kiss, Szívós 3	Goals	Vámos 2	Tiszaligeti uszoda, Szolnok; Attendance: 1,000; Referees: Székely, dr. Marosvári

2013 Magyar Kupa
Winner

Diapolo Szeged
3rd Title

1 Viktor Nagy, 2 Ádám Decker, 3 Szilárd Jansik, 4 Dániel Sánta, 5 Márk Vincze, 6 Csaba Kiss, 7 Gábor Hegedűs, 8 Márton Szívós, 9 dr. Tamás Molnár, 10 Zsolt Juhász, 11 Aljoša Kunac, 12 Márton Tóth, 13 Lukáš Seman, 14 Dávid Molnár
Head coach
dr. Balázs Vincze

== See also ==
- 2013–14 Országos Bajnokság I
