= 2015 Magyar Kupa (men's water polo) =

Water polo tournament season

Hungarian Cup

Tournament details
- Country: Hungary
- Teams: 19

Final positions
- Champions: ZF-Eger (4th title)
- Runners-up: Szolnoki Dózsa-KÖZGÉP

Tournament statistics
- Top goal scorer(s): (Serbia) Stefan Mitrović (19 goals)

The 2015 Magyar Kupa, known as (Hungarian: BENU Férfi Magyar Kupa) for sponsorship reasons, is the 89th edition of the tournament.

== Schedule ==
The rounds of the 2015–16 competition are scheduled as follows:

Round	Draw date and time	Matches
Preliminary round	17 August 2015, 12:00 CEST	31 October–1 November 2015
Quarter-finals	2 November 2016, 12:00 CET	21–22 November 2015
Final four	23 November 2015, 12:00 CET	12–13 December 2015 at Bitskey Aladár Uszoda, Eger

== Matches ==
A total of 63 matches will take place, starting with Preliminary round on 31 October 2015 and culminating with the final on 13 December 2015 at the Bitskey Aladár Uszoda in Eger.

=== Preliminary round ===
The first round ties are scheduled for 31 October – 1 November 2015.

Pot 1 Team Szolnoki Dózsa-KÖZGÉP A-HÍD OSC Újbuda ZF-Eger FTC-PQS Waterpolo	Pot 2 Team Szeged Diapolo RacioNet Honvéd Kaposvári Vizilabda Klub VasasPlaket	Pot 3 Team BVSC-Wáberer Hungária-Zugló Debrecen Valdor Szentes UVSE-Hunguest Hotels	Pot 4 Team KSI SE PVSK-Mecsek Füszért PannErgy-MVLC EBP Tatabánya	Pot 5 Team YBL Waterpolo Club Kanizsa Vízilabda SE Ceglédi VSE

==== Group A ====
Tournament will be played in Nagykanizsa.

Team	Pld	W	D	L	GF	GA	Pts
A-HÍD OSC Újbuda	4	4	0	0	87	25	12
Debrecen	4	3	0	1	54	44	9
VasasPlaket	4	2	0	2	45	51	6
EBP Tatabánya	4	1	0	3	33	63	3
Kanizsa Vízilabda SE	4	0	0	4	37	73	0

==== Group B ====
Tournament will be played in Pécs.

Team	Pld	W	D	L	GF	GA	Pts
FTC-PQS Waterpolo	3	3	0	0	35	23	9
Szeged Diapolo	3	2	0	1	38	29	6
UVSE-Hunguest Hotels	3	1	0	2	24	34	3
PVSK-Mecsek Füszért	3	0	0	3	20	31	0

==== Group C ====
Tournament will be played in Miskolc.

Team	Pld	W	D	L	GF	GA	Pts
ZF-Eger	4	4	0	0	74	29	12
RacioNet Honvéd	4	3	0	1	59	35	9
BVSC-Wáberer Hungária-Zugló	4	2	0	2	49	33	6
PannErgy-MVLC	4	1	0	3	40	46	3
Ceglédi VSE	4	0	0	4	21	100	0

==== Group D ====
Tournament will be played in Szentes.

Team	Pld	W	D	L	GF	GA	Pts
Szolnoki Dózsa-KÖZGÉP	4	4	0	0	82	16	12
Kaposvár	4	3	0	1	41	46	9
Valdor Szentes	4	2	0	2	32	45	6
KSI SE	4	1	0	3	33	48	3
YBL Waterpolo Club	4	0	0	4	24	57	0

=== Quarter-finals ===
Quarter-final matches were played on 21 and 22 November 2015.

Team 1	Agg.	Team 2	1st leg	2nd leg
Szeged Diapolo (I)	22–19	Kaposvár (I)	10–10	12–9
ZF-Eger (I)	21–18	FTC-PQS Waterpolo (I)	8–9	13–9
RacioNet Honvéd (I)	11–16	A-HÍD OSC Újbuda (I)	6–6	5–10
Debrecen (I)	14–27	Szolnoki Dózsa-KÖZGÉP (I)	5–13	9–14

== Final four ==
The final four will be held on 12 and 13 December 2015 at the Bitskey Aladár Uszoda in Eger.

Semi-finals
12 December, 12:00
Szolnoki Dózsa-KÖZGÉP	9
Szeged Diapolo	5
12 December, 13:30
A-HÍD OSC Újbuda	4
ZF-Eger	5

Final
13 December, 16:30
Szolnoki Dózsa-KÖZGÉP	8 (4)
ZF-Eger (pen.)	8 (5)

=== Semi-finals ===
12 December 2015; 12:00 (CET)	Report	Szolnoki Dózsa-KÖZGÉP	9–5	Szeged Diapolo	Bitskey Aladár uszoda, Eger; Referees: dr. Marosvári, Németh
12 December 2015; 12:00 (CET)	Report	Score by quarters: 2–1, 4–2, 0–2, 3–0			Bitskey Aladár uszoda, Eger; Referees: dr. Marosvári, Németh
12 December 2015; 12:00 (CET)	Report	Younger 2	Goals	five players 1	Bitskey Aladár uszoda, Eger; Referees: dr. Marosvári, Németh

12 December 2015; 13:30 (CET)	Report	A-HÍD OSC Újbuda	4–5	ZF-Eger	Bitskey Aladár uszoda, Eger; Referees: dr. Molnár, Csanádi
12 December 2015; 13:30 (CET)	Report	Score by quarters: 1–4, 0–0, 2–0, 1–1			Bitskey Aladár uszoda, Eger; Referees: dr. Molnár, Csanádi
12 December 2015; 13:30 (CET)	Report	Bátori 2	Goals	Biros 2	Bitskey Aladár uszoda, Eger; Referees: dr. Molnár, Csanádi

=== Final ===
13 December 2015; 16:30 (CET)	Report	Szolnoki Dózsa-KÖZGÉP	8–8 ^{(4–5 PSO)} (PSO)	ZF-Eger	Bitskey Aladár uszoda, Eger; Attendance: 1,800; Referees: Székely, Kun
13 December 2015; 16:30 (CET)	Report	Score by quarters: 2–2, 1–2, 3–1, 2–3 PSO: 4–5			Bitskey Aladár uszoda, Eger; Attendance: 1,800; Referees: Székely, Kun
13 December 2015; 16:30 (CET)	Report	Dé. Varga 4	Goals	Ćuk 3	Bitskey Aladár uszoda, Eger; Attendance: 1,800; Referees: Székely, Kun

2015 Magyar Kupa
Winner

ZF-Eger
4th title

1 Branislav Mitrović, 2 Dániel Angyal, 3 Barnabás Biros, 4 Uroš Čučković, 5 Norbert Hosnyánszky, 6 Bálint Lőrincz, 7 Miloš Ćuk, 8 Márton Szívós, 9 Balázs Erdélyi, 10 Boris Vapenski, 11 Krisztián Bedő, 12 Benedek Fejes, 13 Péter Biros (c), 14 Kristóf Csoma
Head coach
Norbert Dabrowski

==== Final standings ====
	Team
	ZF-Eger
Silver medal	Szolnoki Dózsa-KÖZGÉP
Bronze medal	A-HÍD OSC Újbuda
Bronze medal	Szeged Diapolo

== See also ==
- 2015–16 Országos Bajnokság I
