= 2014–15 Országos Bajnokság I (men's water polo) =

Water polo league season

OB I
- Season: 2014–15
- Champions: Szolnoki Dózsa-KÖZGÉP (7th title)
- Relegated: No team relegated
- Champions League: Szolnoki Dózsa-KÖZGÉP; A-HÍD OSC Újbuda; ZF-Eger
- Euro Cup: Ferencvárosi TC
- Matches: 182
- Goals: 3,507 (19.27 per match)
- Top goalscorer: Mátyás Pásztor (75 goals)

The 2014–15 Országos Bajnokság I (known as the E.ON férfi OB I for sponsorship reasons) is the 109th season of the Országos Bajnokság I, Hungary's premier Water polo league.

== Team information ==
Location of teams in 2014-15 Országos Bajnokság I
Budapest OB I waterpolo teams

The following 14 clubs compete in the OB I during the 2014–15 season:

OB I
Team	City	Pool	Founded	Colours
BVSC	Budapest	Szőnyi úti uszoda	1911	
Debrecen	Debrecen	Debreceni Sportuszoda	2006	
Eger	Eger	Bitskey Aladár uszoda	1910	
FTC	Budapest	Népligeti uszoda	1899	
Honvéd	Budapest	Kőér utcai uszoda	1950	
Kaposvár	Kaposvár	Kaposvári Városi Fürdő	1999	
KSI	Budapest	Széchy Tamás uszoda	1963	
OSC	Budapest	Nyéki Imre uszoda	1957	
PVSK	Pécs	Abay Nemes Oszkár Sportuszoda	1997	
Szeged	Szeged	Szegedi Sportuszoda	1993	
Szentes	Szentes	Szentesi uszoda	1934	
Szolnok	Szolnok	Tiszaligeti uszoda	1921	
UVSE	Budapest	Hajós Alfréd Sportuszoda	2008	
Vasas	Budapest	Komjádi Béla Sportuszoda	1945	

== Regular season ==
=== Standings ===
	Team	Pld	W	D	L	GF	GA	Diff	Pts	Head-to-head
1	Szolnoki Dózsa-KÖZGÉP	26	25	1	0	389	161	+228	76	
2	A-HÍD OSC Újbuda	26	23	0	3	324	206	+118	69	
3	ZF-Eger	26	21	2	3	336	159	+177	65	
4	Ferencvárosi TC	26	16	2	8	245	239	+6	50	
5	Tiszavirág Szeged Diapolo	26	16	1	9	281	267	+14	49	
6	RacioNet Honvéd	26	15	2	9	232	198	+34	47	
7	BVSC-Wáberer Hungária-Zugló	26	12	1	13	221	241	−20	37	
8	VasasPlaket	26	10	1	15	231	258	−27	31	
9	Debrecen	26	8	1	17	200	299	−99	25	
10	Kaposvár	26	8	0	18	197	247	−50	24	
11	Valdor Szentes	26	6	0	20	235	319	−84	18	
12	KSI SE	26	5	2	19	211	304	−93	17	KSI 10–10 UVSE; UVSE 11–15 KSI
13	UVSE-Hunguest Hotels	26	5	2	19	207	299	−92	17	KSI 10–10 UVSE; UVSE 11–15 KSI
14	PVSK-Mecsek Füszért	26	4	1	21	198	310	−112	13	

Championship Playoff
7th – 10th Placement
Relegation Playout

Pld - Played; W - Won; D - Drawn; L - Lost; GF - Goals for; GA - Goals against; Diff - Difference; Pts - Points.

==== Schedule and results ====
1. round ( 2014.10.08 )
KSI – Debrecen	7–9
FTC – BVSC	7–5
PVSK – Szeged	7–11
OSC – Honvéd	8–6
Kaposvár – Eger	3–8
Szentes – Szolnok	9–17
UVSE – Vasas	10–11

2. round ( 2014.10.11 )
FTC – Debrecen	11–9
PVSK – KSI	13–13
BVSC – OSC	7–9
Kaposvár – Szeged	13–12
Honvéd – Szentes	9–6
UVSE – Eger	7–7
Szolnok – Vasas	14–3

3. round ( 2014.10.18 )
Debrecen – PVSK	6–8
FTC – OSC	7–13
KSI – Kaposvár	7–10
BVSC – Szentes	10–9
Szeged – UVSE	16–10
Honvéd – Vasas	12–6
Eger – Szolnok	9–10

4. round ( 2014.10.25 )
OSC – Debrecen	16–6
Kaposvár – PVSK	8–5
Szentes – FTC	9–12
UVSE – KSI	11–15
Vasas – BVSC	9–12
Szolnok – Szeged	19–7
Eger – Honvéd	10–7

5. round ( 2014.10.31 )
Debrecen – UVSE	8–7
Szentes – Vasas	5–13
Kaposvár – Szolnok	7–8
OSC – Eger	5–8
PVSK – Honvéd	11–12
FTC – Szeged	10–9
KSI – BVSC	8–14

6. round ( 2014.11.05 )
Vasas – Debrecen	10–9
Szolnok – UVSE	18–5
Eger – Szentes	19–4
Honvéd – Kaposvár	6–5
Szeged – OSC	6–13
BVSC – PVSK	8–9
KSI – FTC	5–9

7. round ( 2014.11.15 )
Debrecen – Szolnok	8–18
Vasas – Eger	6–12
UVSE – Honvéd	6–11
Szentes – Szeged	11–12
Kaposvár – BVSC	7–5
OSC – KSI	18–11
PVSK – FTC	5–7

8. round ( 2014.11.22 )
Eger – Debrecen	16–2
Honvéd – Szolnok	5–14
Szeged – Vasas	15–10
BVSC – UVSE	3–5
KSI – Szentes	16–7
FTC – Kaposvár	11–9
PVSK – OSC	10–14

9. round ( 2014.11.25 )
Debrecen – Kaposvár	6–5
OSC – Szentes	25–13
PVSK – UVSE	7–9
FTC – Vasas	9–8
KSI – Szolnok	5–9
BVSC – Eger	4–11
Szeged – Honvéd	11–12

10. round ( 2014.12.13 )
Szentes – Debrecen	9–10
UVSE – Kaposvár	6–5
Vasas – OSC	9–10
Szolnok – PVSK	20–6
Eger – FTC	17–8
Honvéd – KSI	14–9
Szeged – BVSC	8–9

11. round ( 2014.12.20 )
Debrecen – Honvéd	4–13
Eger – Szeged	15–6
Szolnok – BVSC	11–6
Vasas – KSI	13–7
UVSE – FTC	11–12
Szentes – PVSK	11–10
Kaposvár – OSC	8–12

12. round ( 2015.01.10 )
Szeged – Debrecen	9–7
BVSC – Honvéd	5–9
KSI – Eger	3–13
Szolnok – FTC	18–3
PVSK – Vasas	11–10
OSC – UVSE	20–10
Kaposvár – Szentes	13–12

13. round ( 2015.01.17 )
Debrecen – BVSC	7–8
Szeged – KSI	14–8
Honvéd – FTC	10–10
Eger – PVSK	16–7
Szolnok – OSC	11–7
Vasas – Kaposvár	10–8
UVSE – Szentes	6–10

14. round ( 2015.01.24 )
Debrecen – KSI	12–8
BVSC – FTC	8–7
Szeged – PVSK	16–6
Honvéd – OSC	8–9
Eger – Kaposvár	19–2
Szolnok – Szentes	16–7
Vasas – UVSE	10–9

15. round ( 2015.01.31 )
Debrecen – FTC	9–14
KSI – PVSK	11–6
OSC – BVSC	13–8
Szeged – Kaposvár	11–10
Szentes – Honvéd	9–14
Eger – UVSE	17–5
Vasas – Szolnok	5–16

16. round ( 2015.02.04 )
PVSK – Debrecen	10–8
OSC – FTC	9–8
Kaposvár – KSI	7–8
Szentes – BVSC	9–10
UVSE – Szeged	12–15
Vasas – Honvéd	7–7
Szolnok – Eger	10–10

17. round ( 2015.02.07 )
Debrecen – OSC	4–16
PVSK – Kaposvár	9–10
FTC – Szentes	11–6
KSI – UVSE	10–10
BVSC – Vasas	11–10
Szeged – Szolnok	7–16
Honvéd – Eger	8–10

18. round ( 2015.02.21 )
UVSE – Debrecen	9–10
Vasas – Szentes	15–11
Szolnok – Kaposvár	14–3
Eger – OSC	4–5
Honvéd – PVSK	13–6
Szeged – FTC	8–8
BVSC – KSI	11–5

19. round ( 2015.02.25 )
Debrecen – Vasas	7–6
UVSE – Szolnok	9–17
Szentes – Eger	9–14
Kaposvár – Honvéd	0–5
OSC – Szeged	16–9
PVSK – BVSC	9–14
FTC – KSI	15–7

20. round ( 2015.02.28 )
Szolnok – Debrecen	22–6
Eger – Vasas	12–5
Honvéd – UVSE	8–6
Szeged – Szentes	14–9
BVSC – Kaposvár	12–7
KSI – OSC	10–13
FTC – PVSK	10–9

21. round ( 2015.03.07 )
Debrecen – Eger	10–20
Szolnok – Honvéd	11–1
Vasas – Szeged	6–9
UVSE – BVSC	9–8
Szentes – KSI	13–8
Kaposvár – FTC	6–11
OSC – PVSK	18–7

22. round ( 2015.03.11 )
Kaposvár – Debrecen	9–7
Szentes – OSC	7–13
UVSE – PVSK	8–7
Vasas – FTC	6–10
Szolnok – KSI	18–4
Eger – BVSC	15–5
Honvéd – Szeged	8–10

23. round ( 2015.03.14 )
Debrecen – Szentes	9–8
Kaposvár – UVSE	14–7
OSC – Vasas	10–3
PVSK – Szolnok	3–17
FTC – Eger	7–13
KSI – Honvéd	6–5
BVSC – Szeged	7–8

24. round ( 2015.03.21 )
Honvéd – Debrecen	13–8
Szeged – Eger	12–10
BVSC – Szolnok	10–20
KSI – Vasas	7–11
FTC – UVSE	18–7
PVSK – Szentes	5–11
OSC – Kaposvár	11–10

25. round ( 2015.03.28 )
Debrecen – Szeged	6–14
Honvéd – BVSC	7–8
Eger – KSI	17–4
FTC – Szolnok	7–14
Vasas – PVSK	15–7
UVSE – OSC	5–12
Szentes – Kaposvár	11–10

26. round ( 2015.04.04 )
BVSC – Debrecen	13–13
KSI – Szeged	9–12
FTC – Honvéd	3–9
PVSK – Eger	5–14
OSC – Szolnok	9–11
Kaposvár – Vasas	8–14
Szentes – UVSE	10–8

== Championship playoff ==
Teams in bold won the playoff series. Numbers to the left of each team indicate the team's original playoff seeding. Numbers to the right indicate the score of each playoff game.

Quarterfinals
4	**Ferencvárosi TC**	**10**	**10**
5	Tiszavirág Szeged Diapolo	9	8
3	**ZF-Eger**	7	**5**	**13**
6	RacioNet Honvéd	**9**	4	8

Semifinals
1	**Szolnoki Dózsa-KÖZGÉP**	**13**	**9**
4	Ferencvárosi TC	8	7
2	**A-HÍD OSC Újbuda**	**13**	**11**
3	ZF-Eger	11	10

**Final**
1	**Szolnoki Dózsa-KÖZGÉP**	**13**	**12**	**13**
2	A-HÍD OSC Újbuda	9	5	7
Third place
3	**ZF-Eger**	**20**	**12**
4	Ferencvárosi TC	8	7

=== Quarterfinals ===
==== 1st leg ====
10 April; 18:30 (UTC+2)	Report	**Ferencvárosi TC**	**10**–9	Tiszavirág Szeged Diapolo	Népligeti uszoda, Budapest; Referees: Horváth, dr. Marosvári
10 April; 18:30 (UTC+2)	Report	Score by quarters: 2–2, **3**–2, 2–2, 3–3			Népligeti uszoda, Budapest; Referees: Horváth, dr. Marosvári
10 April; 18:30 (UTC+2)	Report	Marnitz 3	**Goals**	Varga II, K. Manhercz 3	Népligeti uszoda, Budapest; Referees: Horváth, dr. Marosvári

11 April; 19:00 (UTC+2)	Report	ZF-Eger	7–**9**	**RacioNet Honvéd**	Bitskey Aladár uszoda, Eger; Referees: Marjay, Csizmadia
11 April; 19:00 (UTC+2)	Report	Score by quarters: **4**–1, 2–2, 0–**5**, 1–1			Bitskey Aladár uszoda, Eger; Referees: Marjay, Csizmadia
11 April; 19:00 (UTC+2)	Report	Bedő 2	**Goals**	Illés, Fazekas 3	Bitskey Aladár uszoda, Eger; Referees: Marjay, Csizmadia

==== 2nd leg ====
21 April; 18:15 (UTC+2)	Report	Tiszavirág Szeged Diapolo	8–**10**	**Ferencvárosi TC**	Szegedi Sportuszoda, Szeged; Referees: Petik, Molnár
21 April; 18:15 (UTC+2)	Report	Score by quarters: 1–**3**, 0–**2**, **3**–2, **4**–3			Szegedi Sportuszoda, Szeged; Referees: Petik, Molnár
21 April; 18:15 (UTC+2)	Report	Kiss, Varga II 2	**Goals**	Ernyey 2	Szegedi Sportuszoda, Szeged; Referees: Petik, Molnár

Ferencvárosi TC won series 2–0 and advanced to Semifinals.

22 April; 18:30 (UTC+2)	Report	RacioNet Honvéd	4–**5**	**ZF-Eger**	Kőér utcai uszoda, Budapest; Referees: Horváth, dr. Molnár
22 April; 18:30 (UTC+2)	Report	Score by quarters: 1–1, 2–**4**, 0–0, **1**–0			Kőér utcai uszoda, Budapest; Referees: Horváth, dr. Molnár
22 April; 18:30 (UTC+2)	Report	Fülöp 2	**Goals**	Erdélyi 2	Kőér utcai uszoda, Budapest; Referees: Horváth, dr. Molnár

==== 3rd leg ====
25 April; 15:30 (UTC+2)	Report	**ZF-Eger**	**13**–8	RacioNet Honvéd	Bitskey Aladár uszoda, Eger; Referees: Molnár, Németh
25 April; 15:30 (UTC+2)	Report	Score by quarters: **4**–1, **3**–0, 2–2, 4–**5**			Bitskey Aladár uszoda, Eger; Referees: Molnár, Németh
25 April; 15:30 (UTC+2)	Report	Hosnyánszky 4	**Goals**	Fazekas 4	Bitskey Aladár uszoda, Eger; Referees: Molnár, Németh

ZF-Eger won series 2–1 and advanced to Semifinals.

=== Semifinals ===
==== 1st leg ====
29 April; 18:30 (UTC+2)	Report	**Szolnoki Dózsa-KÖZGÉP**	**13**–8	Ferencvárosi TC	Tiszaligeti uszoda, Szolnok; Referees: dr. Molnár, Kun
29 April; 18:30 (UTC+2)	Report	Score by quarters: **3**–1, **5**–3, 2–**3**, **3**–1			Tiszaligeti uszoda, Szolnok; Referees: dr. Molnár, Kun
29 April; 18:30 (UTC+2)	Report	Aleksić, Mitrović, Madaras 3	**Goals**	Nyéki 3	Tiszaligeti uszoda, Szolnok; Referees: dr. Molnár, Kun

29 April; 19:00 (UTC+2)	Report	**A-HÍD OSC Újbuda**	**13**–11	ZF-Eger	Nyéki Imre uszoda, Budapest; Referees: Horváth, Petik
29 April; 19:00 (UTC+2)	Report	Score by quarters: 2–**3**, 6–6, **3**–2, **2**–0			Nyéki Imre uszoda, Budapest; Referees: Horváth, Petik
29 April; 19:00 (UTC+2)	Report	Gór-Nagy 3	**Goals**	Erdélyi 3	Nyéki Imre uszoda, Budapest; Referees: Horváth, Petik

==== 2nd leg ====
6 May; 18:15 (UTC+2)	Report	ZF-Eger	10–**11**	**A-HÍD OSC Újbuda**	Bitskey Aladár uszoda, Eger; Referees: Kun, Molnár
6 May; 18:15 (UTC+2)	Report	Score by quarters: 3–**4**, 2–2, 2–**4**, **3**–1			Bitskey Aladár uszoda, Eger; Referees: Kun, Molnár
6 May; 18:15 (UTC+2)	Report	Erdélyi 4	**Goals**	Salamon 3	Bitskey Aladár uszoda, Eger; Referees: Kun, Molnár

A-HÍD OSC Újbuda won series 2–0 and advanced to the Final.

6 May; 19:00 (UTC+2)	Report	Ferencvárosi TC	7–**9**	**Szolnoki Dózsa-KÖZGÉP**	Népligeti uszoda, Budapest; Referees: dr. Marosvári, Székely
6 May; 19:00 (UTC+2)	Report	Score by quarters: 2–2, 1–1, 0–**4**, **4**–2			Népligeti uszoda, Budapest; Referees: dr. Marosvári, Székely
6 May; 19:00 (UTC+2)	Report	Kolozsi 2	**Goals**	Varga Dé. 3	Népligeti uszoda, Budapest; Referees: dr. Marosvári, Székely

Szolnoki Dózsa-KÖZGÉP won series 2–0 and advanced to the Final.

=== Final ===
- **1st leg**

12 May; 19:15 (UTC+2)	Report	**Szolnoki Dózsa-KÖZGÉP**	**13**–9	A-HÍD OSC Újbuda	Tiszaligeti uszoda, Szolnok; Attendance: 1,000; Referees: Horváth, Molnár
12 May; 19:15 (UTC+2)	Report	Score by quarters: **4**–3, **3**–0, 3–3, 3–3			Tiszaligeti uszoda, Szolnok; Attendance: 1,000; Referees: Horváth, Molnár
12 May; 19:15 (UTC+2)	Report	Aleksić, Mitrović 3	**Goals**	Bátori, Kayes 2	Tiszaligeti uszoda, Szolnok; Attendance: 1,000; Referees: Horváth, Molnár

- **2nd leg**

15 May; 20:00 (UTC+2)	Report	A-HÍD OSC Újbuda	5–**12**	**Szolnoki Dózsa-KÖZGÉP**	Nyéki Imre uszoda, Budapest; Attendance: 1,000; Referees: dr. Marosvári, Németh
15 May; 20:00 (UTC+2)	Report	Score by quarters: 2–**4**, 0–**4**, 2–**3**, 1–1			Nyéki Imre uszoda, Budapest; Attendance: 1,000; Referees: dr. Marosvári, Németh
15 May; 20:00 (UTC+2)	Report	Decker, Salamon 2	**Goals**	Varga Dé. 4	Nyéki Imre uszoda, Budapest; Attendance: 1,000; Referees: dr. Marosvári, Németh

- **3rd leg**

18 May; 19:00 (UTC+2)	Report	**Szolnoki Dózsa-KÖZGÉP**	**13**–7	A-HÍD OSC Újbuda	Tiszaligeti uszoda, Szolnok; Attendance: 1,100; Referees: dr. Molnár, Kun
18 May; 19:00 (UTC+2)	Report	Score by quarters: 1–1, 4–4, **2**–0, **6**–2			Tiszaligeti uszoda, Szolnok; Attendance: 1,100; Referees: dr. Molnár, Kun
18 May; 19:00 (UTC+2)	Report	Tóth 4	**Goals**	Hegedűs, Kayes 2	Tiszaligeti uszoda, Szolnok; Attendance: 1,100; Referees: dr. Molnár, Kun

Szolnoki Dózsa-KÖZGÉP won Championship final series 3–0.

2014–15 OB I
Winner

**Szolnoki Dózsa-KÖZGÉP**
**7th** Title

1 Viktor Nagy, 2 Živko Gocić, 3 Norbert Madaras, 4 Márton Vámos, 5 Zoltán Hangay, 6 Tamás Mezei, 7 Milan Aleksić, 8 Márton Tóth, 9 Dániel Varga (c), 10 Dénes Varga, 11 Gábor Kis, 12 Stefan Mitrović, 13 Dávid Jansik, 14 Attila Decker
Head coach: ifj. Sándor Cseh

== 7th – 10th placement ==
Teams in bold won the playoff series. Numbers to the left of each team indicate the team's original playoff seeding. Numbers to the right indicate the score of each playoff game.

7th–10th placement semifinals
8	**VasasPlaket**	**12**	**12**
9	Debrecen	10	10
7	BVSC-Wáberer Hungária-Zugló	8^{2}	9^{3}
10	**Kaposvár**	**8^{4}**	**9^{4}**

7th place match
8	VasasPlaket	7^{2}	9^{5}
10	**Kaposvár**	**7^{3}**	**9^{6}**
9th place match
7	**BVSC-Wáberer Hungária-Zugló**	**12**	**10**
9	Debrecen	9	7

== Relegation playout ==
Teams in bold won the playoff series. Numbers to the left of each team indicate the team's original playoff seeding. Numbers to the right indicate the score of each playoff game.

11th–14th placement semifinals
11	**Valdor Szentes**	**12**	**11**
14	PVSK-Mecsek Füszért	7	8
12	KSI SE	**9^{5}**	9	4
13	**UVSE-Hunguest Hotels**	9^{4}	**11**	**14**

11th place match
11	**Valdor Szentes**	**11**	**15**
13	UVSE-Hunguest Hotels	6	8
Relegation play-offs
12	**KSI SE**	**15**	**9**
14	PVSK-Mecsek Füszért	11	8

== Season statistics ==
=== Top goalscorers ===
Updated to games played on 19 May 2015.

Rank	Player	Team	Goals
1	(Hungary) **Mátyás Pásztor**	BVSC	**75**
2	(Hungary) Dénes Varga	Szolnok	71
3	(Hungary) László Weszelovszky	Szentes	66
3	(Hungary) Bence Bátori	OSC	66
5	(Serbia) Milan Aleksić	Szolnok	62
5	(Hungary) Zsolt Varga	Szeged	62
7	(Serbia) Miloš Ćuk	Eger	56
7	(Hungary) Tamás Gyárfás	Vasas	56
9	(Serbia) Stefan Mitrović	Szolnok	53
9	(Hungary) Norbert Madaras	Szolnok	53
9	(Hungary) Zoltán Péter Dávid	UVSE	53

=== Top assists ===
Updated to games played on 19 May 2015.

Rank	Player	Team	Assists
1	(Hungary) **András Krizsán**	PVSK	**59**
2	(Hungary) Roland Zsolt Simon	Honvéd	58
3	(Hungary) Dániel Angyal	Eger	57
3	(Hungary) Erik Bundschuch	OSC	57
5	(Hungary) Péter Tiba	UVSE	56
6	(Hungary) Adrián Simon	Honvéd	55
7	(Hungary) Máté Süveges	Debrecen	54
7	(Hungary) Bálint Takács	Vasas	54
9	(Hungary) Dávid Hőna	Vasas	53
10	(Hungary) Zsolt Varga	Szeged	49

=== MVP ===
Updated to games played on 4 April 2015.

Rank	Player	Team	Rating
1	(Hungary) **Dénes Varga**	Szolnok	**69.5**
2	(Hungary) Mátyás Pásztor	BVSC	66.1
3	(Hungary) Norbert Madaras	Szolnok	65.6
4	(Serbia) Stefan Mitrović	Szolnok	59.8
5	(Serbia) Milan Aleksić	Szolnok	58.1
6	(Hungary) Krisztián Bedő	Eger	58.0
7	(Hungary) Viktor Vörös	Szentes	57.5
8	(Hungary) Dániel Varga	Szolnok	56.6
9	(Hungary) Balázs Hárai	Eger	54.5
10	(Hungary) Balázs Erdélyi	Eger	52.8

=== Number of teams by counties ===
	County (megye)	No. teams	Teams
1	Budapest	7	BVSC, FTC, Honvéd, KSI, OSC, UVSE and Vasas
2	Csongrád	2	Szeged and Szentes
3	Baranya	1	PVSK
3	Hajdú-Bihar	1	Debrecen
3	Heves	1	Eger
3	Jász-Nagykun-Szolnok	1	Szolnok
3	Somogy	1	Kaposvár

== Final standing ==
Qualified for the 2015-16 LEN Champions League
Qualified for the 2015-16 LEN Euro Cup

Rank	Team
1st place, gold medalist(s)	**Szolnoki Dózsa-KÖZGÉP**
2nd place, silver medalist(s)	A-HÍD OSC Újbuda
3rd place, bronze medalist(s)	ZF-Eger
4	Ferencvárosi TC
5	Tiszavirág Szeged Diapolo
6	RacioNet Honvéd
7	Kaposvár
8	VasasPlaket
9	BVSC-Wáberer Hungária-Zugló
10	Debrecen
11	Valdor Szentes
12	UVSE-Hunguest Hotels
13	KSI SE
14	PVSK-Mecsek Füszért
