= 2023 Magyar Kupa (men's water polo) =

Men's water polo tournament

2023 BENU Magyar Kupa
Tournament details
- Country: Hungary
- City: Budapest
- Venue(s): Alfréd Hajós National Swimming Stadium
- Dates: 2–3 September 2023
- Teams: 14
- Defending champions: FTC-Telekom

Final positions
- Champions: FTC-Telekom (23rd title)
- Runner-up: A-Híd VasasPlaket
- Semifinalists: Genesys OSC-Újbuda; Endo Plus Service-Honvéd

Tournament statistics
- Scoring leader(s): Strahinja Rašović (18 goals)
- Sponsored name, referring to BENU.

The 2023 Magyar Kupa (English: Hungarian Cup) is the 97th season of Hungary's annual knock-out cup water polo competition. The title holders were FTC-Telekom by winning the 2022 Magyar Kupa Final.

All times are in Central European Summer Time (UTC+02:00).

== Format ==
- The matches were played on a 25 × 20 m pool.

Round		Number of fixtures	Clubs	New entries this round	Leagues entering at this round (tier)
Qualification round		18	12 → 6	12	Országos Bajnokság I (1st): 12 teams
Quarter-finals		4	8 → 4	2	Országos Bajnokság I (1st): 2 teams
Final four	Semi-finals	2	4 → 2	none	none
Final four	Final	1	2 → 1	none	none

== Teams ==
Tier	League	No	Teams
1	OB I	14	Ferencváros, OSC, Honvéd, Vasas, BVSC, Szolnok, Eger, Miskolc, Szeged, UVSE, PVSK, Kaposvár, Szentes, KSI

== Schedule ==
The rounds of the 2023 competition are scheduled as follows:

Round	Matches
Qualification round	18–19 August 2023
Quarterfinals	25 and 27 August 2023
Final four	2–3 September 2023

== Qualification round ==
The qualification round ties were scheduled for 18–19 August 2023.

=== Group A ===
Tournament was played at Városi Fürdő, Kaposvár.

Pos	Team	Pld	W	D	L	GF	GA	GD	Pts	Qualification	HON	KAP	UVS	MIS
1	Endo Plus Service-Honvéd	3	3	0	0	45	23	+22	9	Quarterfinals	—	13–5	13–11	—
2	Kaposvár (H)	3	2	0	1	34	37	−3	6	Quarterfinals	—	—	—	14–13
3	UVSE	3	0	1	2	32	38	−6	1		—	11–15	—	10–10
4	PannErgy-MVLC Miskolc	3	0	1	2	30	43	−13	1		7–19	—	—	—

Source: Hungarian Water Polo Federaration
(H) Hosts

=== Group B ===
Tournament was played at Bitskey Aladár Uszoda, Eger.

Pos	Team	Pld	W	D	L	GF	GA	GD	Pts	Qualification	BVS	EGE	SZG	KSI
1	BVSC-Zugló	3	3	0	0	50	21	+29	9	Quarterfinals	—	—	16–6	21–7
2	Tigra-ZF-Eger (H)	3	2	0	1	32	33	−1	6	Quarterfinals	8–13	—	—	—
3	Szeged	3	1	0	2	40	37	+3	3		—	10–11	—	24–10
4	KSI SE	3	0	0	3	27	58	−31	0		—	10–13	—	—

Source: Hungarian Water Polo Federaration
(H) Hosts

=== Group C ===
Tournament was played at Dr. Rébeli-Szabó József Sportuszoda, Szentes.

Pos	Team	Pld	W	D	L	GF	GA	GD	Pts	Qualification	VAS	SZO	SZN	PVS
1	A-Híd VasasPlaket	3	3	0	0	39	25	+14	9	Quarterfinals	—	—	12–6	14–8
2	Szolnoki Dózsa-Praktiker	3	2	0	1	38	31	+7	6	Quarterfinals	11–13	—	—	—
3	Metalcom Szentes (H)	3	1	0	2	31	38	−7	3		—	9–11	—	—
4	PVSK-Mecsek Füszért	3	0	0	3	32	46	−14	0		—	9–16	15–16	—

Source: Hungarian Water Polo Federaration
(H) Hosts

== Quarterfinals ==
The quarter-final matches were played on 25 and 27 August 2023.

Team 1	Agg.	Team 2	1st leg	2nd leg
Endo Plus Service-Honvéd	30–19	Tigra-ZF-Eger	17–7	13–12
A-Híd VasasPlaket	44–20	Kaposvár	21–11	23–9
Genesys OSC-Újbuda	27–20	Szolnoki Dózsa-Praktiker	9–9	18–11
FTC-Telekom	39–25	BVSC-Zugló	24–16	15–9

== Final four ==
The final four was held on 2–3 September 2023 at the Alfréd Hajós National Swimming Stadium in Budapest.

Semifinals
2 September, 17:30
A-Híd VasasPlaket	14
Genesys OSC-Újbuda	13
2 September, 19:00
Endo Plus Service-Honvéd	6
FTC-Telekom	9

Final
3 September, 18:30
A-Híd VasasPlaket	6
FTC-Telekom	11

=== Semifinals ===
2 September 2023; 17:30	Report	A-Híd VasasPlaket	14–13	Genesys OSC-Újbuda	Alfréd Hajós National Swimming Stadium, Budapest; Attendance: 1,800; Referees: Csanádi, Kollár
2 September 2023; 17:30	Report	Score by quarters: 4–3, 0–1, 5–6, 5–3			Alfréd Hajós National Swimming Stadium, Budapest; Attendance: 1,800; Referees: Csanádi, Kollár
2 September 2023; 17:30	Report	Rašović 4	Goals	Baksa 4	Alfréd Hajós National Swimming Stadium, Budapest; Attendance: 1,800; Referees: Csanádi, Kollár

2 September 2023; 19:00	Report	Endo Plus Service-Honvéd	6–9	FTC-Telekom	Alfréd Hajós National Swimming Stadium, Budapest; Attendance: 2,200; Referees: Petik, Rubos
2 September 2023; 19:00	Report	Score by quarters: 2–2, 2–3, 2–3, 0–1			Alfréd Hajós National Swimming Stadium, Budapest; Attendance: 2,200; Referees: Petik, Rubos
2 September 2023; 19:00	Report	Zs. Ekler 3	Goals	three players 2	Alfréd Hajós National Swimming Stadium, Budapest; Attendance: 2,200; Referees: Petik, Rubos

=== Final ===
3 September 2023; 18:30	Report	A-Híd VasasPlaket	6–11	FTC-Telekom	Alfréd Hajós National Swimming Stadium, Budapest; Attendance: 2,500; Referees: Kovács Cs., Kun
3 September 2023; 18:30	Report	Score by quarters: 1–3, 2–1, 0–4, 3–3			Alfréd Hajós National Swimming Stadium, Budapest; Attendance: 2,500; Referees: Kovács Cs., Kun
3 September 2023; 18:30	Report	Dedović 2	Goals	three players 2	Alfréd Hajós National Swimming Stadium, Budapest; Attendance: 2,500; Referees: Kovács Cs., Kun

==== Final standings ====
	Team
	FTC-Telekom
Silver medal	A-Híd VasasPlaket
Bronze medal	Genesys OSC-Újbuda
Bronze medal	Endo Plus Service-Honvéd

2023 Magyar Kupa champions
FTC-Telekom
23rd title

== See also ==
- 2023–24 Országos Bajnokság I
