= Debreceni Cívis Póló Vízilabda SE =

Hungarian water polo club

Debreceni Vízilabda Sport Egyesület
- Founded: 2006; 20 years ago
- League: Országos Bajnokság I/B
- Based in: Debrecen, Hungary
- Arena: Debrecen Swimming Pool Complex (Capacity: 2,000)
- Colors: Red and white
- President: István Becsky
- Head coach: Kálmán Kádár
- 2021–22: Országos Bajnokság I, 14th of 14 (relegated)
- Website: dvse.hu

Debreceni Vízilabda Sport Egyesület is a Hungarian water polo club from Debrecen, that plays in the OB I, the top-level league of water polo in Hungary. Founded in 2006, the team first entered the domestic competition system in 2007, playing in the third division. They won promotion to the second-tier championship in 2010, but, after received an invitation from the Hungarian Waterpolo Federation to join the expanding OB I, Debrecen jumped another level and began the 2010–11 season in the top division.

== Naming history ==
- Debreceni Cívis Póló Vízilabda SE: (2006/07 – 2009/10)
- Debrecen Fujitsu: (2010/11)
- Debreceni VSE: (2011/12 – 2020/21)
- DVSE-Master Good: (2021/22)

== Honours ==
=== European competitions ===
- LEN Euro Cup

Semi-finalist (1): 2012–13

== Current squad ==
Season 2016–2017

No.	Nat.	Player	Birth Date	Position	L/R
1	(Hungary)	Márton Lévai	April 29, 1992 (age 34)	Goalkeeper	
2	(Hungary)	Gergő Smitula	April 2, 1996 (age 30)	Centre Forward / Guard	R
3	(Hungary)	Márk Kállay (c)	February 8, 1986 (age 40)	Wing	L
4	(Slovakia)	Lukáš Ďurík	December 2, 1992 (age 33)	Centre Forward	
5	(Hungary)	Péter Tóth	April 18, 1992 (age 34)	Wing	
6	(Hungary)	Tamás Kuncz	May 4, 1986 (age 40)	Guard	R
7	(Hungary)	Tamás Somlai	March 25, 1993 (age 33)	Wing	L
8	(Hungary)	Máté Müller	January 8, 1992 (age 34)	Wing	R
9	(Hungary)	Máté Süveges	October 31, 1983 (age 42)	Centre Forward	R
	(Hungary)	Gábor Katona	September 10, 2000 (age 25)	Centre Forward	
10	(Hungary)	Szabolcs Szőke	September 1, 1989 (age 36)	Wing / Centre Back	R
11	(Spain)	Sergi Mora	July 5, 1982 (age 43)	Centre Back	R
12	(Hungary)	Gergő Fekete	June 24, 2000 (age 25)		
13	(Italy)	Tommaso Busilacchi	November 3, 1994 (age 31)	Centre Forward	
14	(Hungary)	Roland Kaszanyi	October 14, 1997 (age 28)	Goalkeeper	

=== Staff ===
Technical Staff
Chairman	(Hungary) István Becsky
Head coach	(Hungary) Péter Komlósi
Assistant coach	(Hungary) István Kis
Masseur	(Hungary) Zoltán Bihari
Club doctor	(Hungary) dr. Márton Fésűs

=== Transfers (2016-17) ===
Source: vizipolo.hu

In:

- (Hungary) Tamás Somlai (from Miskolci VLC)
- (Hungary) Péter Tóth (from Pécsi VSK)
- (Italy) Tommaso Busilacchi (from Sport Management)
- (Slovakia) Lukáš Ďurík (from Barcelona)

Out:

- (Hungary) Gergely Pataki (to Kaposvár)
- (Hungary) Árpád Babay (to Vasas)
- (Hungary) Márton Halek (to Miskolci VLC)
- (Hungary) Attila Kincses (to Miskolci VLC)
- (Hungary) Gergely Hoppál (to Tatabányai Vízmű)

== Recent seasons ==
As of 11 August 2022.

Season	Tier	League	Pos.	Domestic cup	European competitions	
2008–09	3	OB II	7th			
2009–10	3	OB II	3rd^{1}			
2010–11	1	OB I	8th			
2011–12	1	OB I	5th			
2012–13	1	OB I	5th	Semifinalist	2 Euro Cup	SF
2013–14	1	OB I	6th	Quarterfinalist		
2014–15	1	OB I	10th	Preliminary round		
2015–16	1	OB I	9th	Quarterfinalist		
2016–17	1	OB I	11th	Preliminary round		
2017–18	1	OB I	8th	Preliminary round		
2018–19	1	OB I	8th	Preliminary round		
2019–20	1	OB I	15th^{2}	Preliminary round		
2020–21	1	OB I	14th	Preliminary round		
2021–22	1	OB I	14th	Preliminary round		
2022–23	2	OB I/B				

^1 Promoted to OB I due MVLSZ decision.
^2 Cancelled due to the COVID-19 pandemic in Hungary.

=== In European competition ===
- Participations in Euro Cup: 1x

Season	Competition	Round	Club	Home	Away	Aggregate
2012-13	Euro Cup	Quarter-finals	(Russia) Dynamo Moscow	13-9	8-5	21–14
2012-13	Euro Cup	Semi-finals	(Serbia) Radnički Kragujevac	10-12	6-9	16–21

== Notable former players ==
=== Olympic champions ===
- Tamás Varga – 4 years (2011-2015) 2004 Athens, 2008 Beijing
- (Serbia) Branislav Mitrović – 3 years (2011-2014) 2016 Rio de Janeiro

== Former coaches ==
- (Hungary) András Gyöngyösi (2009–2013)
- (Hungary) Tamás Varga (2013–2016)
- (Hungary) Péter Komlósi (2017– present)
