= Attila Decker =

Hungarian water polo player

Personal information
- Nickname: Deki
- Nationality: Hungarian
- Born: 25 August 1987 (age 39) Budapest, Hungary
- Height: 1.97 m (6 ft 6 in)

Sport
- Sport: Water polo
- Handedness: Right
- Position: Goalkeeper

Youth career
- Years: Team
- 1997–: BVSC

Senior clubs
- Years: Team
- –2005: BVSC
- 2005–2008: Eger
- 2008–2009: BVSC
- 2009–2010: Ferencváros
- 2010–2011: Debrecen
- 2011–2016: Szolnok
- 2016–2023: Bp. Honvéd
National team
- Years: Team
- 2012–: Hungary
Medal record
Representing Hungary
Men's water polo
World Championships
Gold medal – first place	2013 Barcelona	Team
Silver medal – second place	2017 Budapest	Team
European Championship
Silver medal – second place	2014 Budapest	Team
- Updated on 2 August 2023

Attila Decker (born 25 August 1987) is a Hungarian male water polo player. He is part of the Hungary men's national water polo team. He won a gold medal at the 2013 World Championships. He is the younger brother of Ádám Decker water polo player.

== Honours ==
=== National ===
- World Championships: Gold medal - 2013; Silver medal - 2017
- European Championship: Gold medal - 2020; Silver medal - 2014; Bronze medal - 2008, 2016
- FINA World Cup: Silver medal - 2014
- FINA World League: Silver medal - 2013, 2014

=== Club ===
Eger (Brendon-Fenstherm-ZF-Eger)

- Hungarian Cup (1x): 2007
- LEN Cup runners-up: 2007–08

Szolnok (Szolnoki Dózsa-KÖZGÉP)

- Hungarian Championship (2x): 2014–15, 2015–16
- Hungarian Cup (1x): 2014

== See also ==
- Hungary men's Olympic water polo team records and statistics
- List of men's Olympic water polo tournament goalkeepers
- List of world champions in men's water polo
- List of World Aquatics Championships medalists in water polo
