= 2012–13 Országos Bajnokság I (men's water polo) =

Water polo league season

OB I
- Season: 2012–13
- Champions: Eger
- Relegated: -
- Champions League: Eger; Szolnok
- LEN Trophy: Szeged; Vasas

The 2012–13 Országos Bajnokság I is the 107th season of the Országos Bajnokság I, Hungary's premier Water polo league.

== Team information ==
Location of teams in the 2012–13 Országos Bajnokság I

Team	Location	Swimming Pool	Capacity
BVSC	Budapest	BVSC Sportuszoda	
Debreceni VSE	Debrecen	Debrecen Swimming Pool Complex	2,000
Eger	Eger	Aladár Bistkey Swimming Pool	3,000
EKF-Eger	Eger	Aladár Bistkey Swimming Pool	3,000
Ferencváros	Budapest	Népliget Sportuszoda	300
Honvéd	Budapest	Kőér Street Swimming Pool	700
Junior álogatott	Budapest	Alfréd Hajós National Swimming Stadium	
Kaposvári VK	Kaposvár	Virágfürdő	
Orvosegyetem SC	Budapest	Alfréd Hajós National Swimming Stadium	
Pécsi VSK	Pécs	Abay Nemes Oszkár Sportuszoda	
Szeged Beton	Szeged	Városi Sportuszoda	800
Szentesi VK	Szentes	Szentesi Üdülőközpon	
Szolnoki Dózsa	Szolnok	Tiszaligeti Uszoda	500
Vasas	Budapest	Komjádi Swimming Pool	1,800

== Regular season ==
=== Standings ===
	Team	Pld	W	D	L	GF	GA	Diff	Pts
1	A-HÍD Szeged	26	24	1	1	321	190	+131	73
2	ZF-Eger	26	23	2	1	318	149	169	71
3	TEVA-Vasas	26	22	3	1	278	171	+107	69
4	Szolnoki Dózsa-Közgép	26	19	1	6	307	154	+153	58
5	Debrecen	26	16	2	8	261	208	+53	50
6	Grupama-Honvéd	26	14	1	11	209	206	+3	43
7	BVSC-Zugló	26	14	0	12	230	222	+8	42
8	Valdor-Szentes	26	11	0	15	232	276	−44	33
9	Orvosegyetem SC	26	9	3	14	209	261	−52	30
10	EKF-EgerFood-Imo	26	5	2	19	171	269	−98	17
11	Junior válogatott	26	5	2	19	226	312	−86	17
12	Ferencváros	26	4	2	20	173	267	−94	14
13	Pécsi VSK	26	4	0	22	210	322	−112	12
14	Kaposvár	26	2	1	23	175	313	−138	7

1 to 8 Playoff
9 to 14 Playoff

Pld - Played; W - Won; L - Lost; PF - Points for; PA - Points against; Diff - Difference; Pts - Points.

=== Results ===
In the table below the home teams are listed on the left and the away teams along the top.

	BVSC	DVSE	EGER	EKF	FTC	HON	JUN	KAP	OSC	PVSK	SZEG	SZEN	SZOL	VAS
BVSC-Zugló		9–15	4–9	13–2	11–9	10–9	12–8	12–4	8–6	13–11	10–13	9–5	5–6	5–10
Debrecen	14–10		3–9	13–6	11–6	6–9	14–7	14–7	10–10	15–6	9–10	16–7	5–5	5–10
ZF-Eger	8–1	12–7		15–8	16–4	15–3	15–7	15–4	22–3	20–6	11–8	20–6	7–6	7–7
EKF-EgerFood-Imo	7–6	9–12	7–13		5–5	10–11	7–7	5–8	6–8	10–8	8–13	6–7	3–13	8–14
Ferencváros	7–11	8–15	6–9	6–8		6–10	6–12	10–6	4–7	11–8	3–17	7–11	4–9	7–10
Grupama-Honvéd	10–6	2–4	6–7	8–3	8–6		10–5	12–4	10–6	11–6	5–9	14–8	5–11	3–8
Junior válogatott	8–9	11–16	7–15	6–8	8–10	13–5		14–11	8–9	11–8	10–18	8–14	4–17	11–20
Kaposvár	8–16	7–10	5–13	5–8	7–7	9–11	7–9		7–12	14–9	7–14	7–9	6–17	5–11
Orvosegyetem SC	6–10	6–9	6–14	11–8	4–7	9–9	10–10	13–4		14–7	7–19	14–13	5–13	6–9
Pécsi VSK	7–9	5–12	2–9	11–9	12–9	8–13	10–9	12–11	10–13		11–13	9–11	6–17	7–9
A-HÍD Szeged	14–10	11–6	9–7	15–7	11–5	7–6	17–9	17–7	12–5	13–6		13–8	6–4	9–9
Valdor-Szentes	6–7	8–9	7–12	11–7	11–10	6–9	12–9	14–6	7–6	15–11	8–15		7–13	6–11
Szolnoki Dózsa-Közgép	12–7	6–5	10–11	19–3	18–6	12–4	14–5	18–5	14–7	19–7	5–7	15–8		6–7
TEVA-Vasas	8–7	12–6	7–7	11–3	12–4	12–6	18–10	11–4	11–6	12–7	7–11	13–7	9–8	

- ^{*}match awarded

== 1 to 8 Playoff ==
Quarterfinals
1	A-HÍD Szeged	14	17
8	Valdor-Szentes	7	5
4	Szolnoki Dózsa-Közgép	12	8
5	Debrecen	6	4
3	TEVA-Vasas	8	9
6	Grupama-Honvéd	7	7
2	ZF-Eger	16	13
7	BVSC-Zugló	5	8

Semifinals
1	A-HÍD Szeged	9	8
4	Szolnoki Dózsa-Közgép	11	11
3	TEVA-Vasas	10	6
2	ZF-Eger	13	8

Final
4	Szolnoki Dózsa-Közgép	7	6	9
2	ZF-Eger	9	7	10
Third place
1	A-HÍD Szeged	9	9
3	TEVA-Vasas	8	8

=== Quarter-finals ===
==== 1st leg ====
April 19; 19:00 (UTC+2)	Report	A-HÍD Szeged	14–7	Valdor-Szentes	Szegedi Sportuszoda, Szeged; Referees: László Bors, István Vojvoda
April 19; 19:00 (UTC+2)	Report	Score by quarters: 2–0, 6–2, 4–2, 2–3			Szegedi Sportuszoda, Szeged; Referees: László Bors, István Vojvoda
April 19; 19:00 (UTC+2)	Report	Molnár, Kayes 3	Goals	Tóth 3	Szegedi Sportuszoda, Szeged; Referees: László Bors, István Vojvoda

April 20; 18:00 (UTC+2)	Report	ZF-Eger	16–5	BVSC-Zugló	Bitskey Aladár Sportuszoda, Eger; Referees: Csaba Horváth, Szabolcs Dodog
April 20; 18:00 (UTC+2)	Report	Score by quarters: 3–1, 3–1, 5–2, 5–1			Bitskey Aladár Sportuszoda, Eger; Referees: Csaba Horváth, Szabolcs Dodog
April 20; 18:00 (UTC+2)	Report	Varga 3	Goals	five players 1	Bitskey Aladár Sportuszoda, Eger; Referees: Csaba Horváth, Szabolcs Dodog

April 20; 19:30 (UTC+2)	Report	TEVA-Vasas	8–7	Grupama-Honvéd	Komjádi Béla Sportuszoda, Budapest; Referees: András Németh, dr. Balázs Fekete
April 20; 19:30 (UTC+2)	Report	Score by quarters: 2–1, 3–2, 1–3, 2–1			Komjádi Béla Sportuszoda, Budapest; Referees: András Németh, dr. Balázs Fekete
April 20; 19:30 (UTC+2)	Report	Brguljan 3	Goals	Fülöp 4	Komjádi Béla Sportuszoda, Budapest; Referees: András Németh, dr. Balázs Fekete

April 20; 14:15 (UTC+2)	Report	Szolnoki Dózsa-Közgép	12–6	Debrecen	Tiszaligeti uszoda, Szolnok; Referees: Zsolt Füzesi, Balázs Székely
April 20; 14:15 (UTC+2)	Report	Score by quarters: 1–2, 3–2, 4–1, 4–1			Tiszaligeti uszoda, Szolnok; Referees: Zsolt Füzesi, Balázs Székely
April 20; 14:15 (UTC+2)	Report	Aleksić 3	Goals	Letica 2	Tiszaligeti uszoda, Szolnok; Referees: Zsolt Füzesi, Balázs Székely

==== 2nd leg ====
April 20; 11:00 (UTC+2)	Report	Valdor-Szentes	5–17	A-HÍD Szeged	Szentesi uszoda, Szentes; Referees: Zsolt Csanádi, Miklós Marnitz
April 20; 11:00 (UTC+2)	Report	Score by quarters: 1–4, 2–3, 2–5, 0–5			Szentesi uszoda, Szentes; Referees: Zsolt Csanádi, Miklós Marnitz
April 20; 11:00 (UTC+2)	Report	Bálint, Szabó 2	Goals	Szivós 7	Szentesi uszoda, Szentes; Referees: Zsolt Csanádi, Miklós Marnitz

A-HÍD Szeged won series 2–0 and advanced to Semifinals.

April 24; 19:45 (UTC+2)	Report	BVSC-Zugló	8–13	ZF-Eger	Szőnyi úti uszoda, Budapest; Referees: Károly Rubos, dr. Balázs Fekete
April 24; 19:45 (UTC+2)	Report	Score by quarters: 1–4, 2–2, 2–4, 3–3			Szőnyi úti uszoda, Budapest; Referees: Károly Rubos, dr. Balázs Fekete
April 24; 19:45 (UTC+2)	Report	Létay 3	Goals	four players 2	Szőnyi úti uszoda, Budapest; Referees: Károly Rubos, dr. Balázs Fekete

ZF-Eger won series 2–0 and advanced to Semifinals.

April 24; 20:00 (UTC+2)	Report	Grupama-Honvéd	7–9	TEVA-Vasas	Kőér utcai uszoda, Budapest; Referees: Balázs Székely, Gábor Vogel
April 24; 20:00 (UTC+2)	Report	Score by quarters: 2–1, 3–2, 1–3, 2–1			Kőér utcai uszoda, Budapest; Referees: Balázs Székely, Gábor Vogel
April 24; 20:00 (UTC+2)	Report	Fülöp 2	Goals	Vámos 4	Kőér utcai uszoda, Budapest; Referees: Balázs Székely, Gábor Vogel

TEVA-Vasas won series 2–0 and advanced to Semifinals.

April 24; 19:30 (UTC+2)	Report	Debrecen	4–8	Szolnoki Dózsa-Közgép	Debreceni uszoda, Debrecen; Referees: ifj. György Juhász, György Kun
April 24; 19:30 (UTC+2)	Report	Score by quarters: 0–2, 2–2, 1–3, 1–1			Debreceni uszoda, Debrecen; Referees: ifj. György Juhász, György Kun
April 24; 19:30 (UTC+2)	Report	Vindisch 2	Goals	Aleksić 3	Debreceni uszoda, Debrecen; Referees: ifj. György Juhász, György Kun

Szolnoki Dózsa-Közgép won series 2–0 and advanced to Semifinals.

=== Semifinals ===
==== 1st leg ====
May 5; 11:00 (UTC+2)	Report	A-HÍD Szeged	9–11	Szolnoki Dózsa-Közgép	Szegedi Sportuszoda, Szeged; Referees: ifj. György Juhász, Balázs Székely
May 5; 11:00 (UTC+2)	Report	Score by quarters: 3–4, 2–3, 1–1, 3–3			Szegedi Sportuszoda, Szeged; Referees: ifj. György Juhász, Balázs Székely
May 5; 11:00 (UTC+2)	Report	Kayes 3	Goals	Aleksić 3	Szegedi Sportuszoda, Szeged; Referees: ifj. György Juhász, Balázs Székely

May 4; 17:15 (UTC+2)	Report	ZF-Eger	13–10	TEVA-Vasas	Bitskey Aladár Sportuszoda, Eger; Referees: András Németh, István Vojvoda
May 4; 17:15 (UTC+2)	Report	Score by quarters: 2–3, 5–2, 4–3, 2–2			Bitskey Aladár Sportuszoda, Eger; Referees: András Németh, István Vojvoda
May 4; 17:15 (UTC+2)	Report	Biros 4	Goals	Katonás, Steinmetz Á. 3	Bitskey Aladár Sportuszoda, Eger; Referees: András Németh, István Vojvoda

==== 2nd leg ====
May 8; 18:30 (UTC+2)	Report	Szolnoki Dózsa-Közgép	11–8	A-HÍD Szeged	Tiszaligeti uszoda, Szolnok; Referees: András Németh, György Kun
May 8; 18:30 (UTC+2)	Report	Score by quarters: 2–1, 2–3, 4–3, 3–1			Tiszaligeti uszoda, Szolnok; Referees: András Németh, György Kun
May 8; 18:30 (UTC+2)	Report	Nyéki, Aleksić 4	Goals	Szívós, Kayes 2	Tiszaligeti uszoda, Szolnok; Referees: András Németh, György Kun

Szolnoki Dózsa-Közgép won series 2–0 and advanced to Final.

May 7; 19:00 (UTC+2)	Report	TEVA-Vasas	6–8	ZF-Eger	Komjádi Béla Sportuszoda, Budapest; Referees: ifj. György Juhász, Balázs Székely
May 7; 19:00 (UTC+2)	Report	Score by quarters: 2–2, 1–5, 2–0, 1–1			Komjádi Béla Sportuszoda, Budapest; Referees: ifj. György Juhász, Balázs Székely
May 7; 19:00 (UTC+2)	Report	Katonás 3	Goals	Biros 2	Komjádi Béla Sportuszoda, Budapest; Referees: ifj. György Juhász, Balázs Székely

ZF-Eger won series 2–0 and advanced to Final.

=== Final ===
==== 1st leg ====
May 15; 18:00 (UTC+2)	Report	ZF-Eger	9–7 (OT)	Szolnoki Dózsa-Közgép	Bitskey Aladár Sportuszoda, Eger; Referees: András Németh, Csaba Horváth
May 15; 18:00 (UTC+2)	Report	Score by quarters: 3–1, 2–1, 1–3, 1–2 OT: 1–0, 1–0			Bitskey Aladár Sportuszoda, Eger; Referees: András Németh, Csaba Horváth
May 15; 18:00 (UTC+2)	Report	Bátori 3	Goals	Kis G. 2	Bitskey Aladár Sportuszoda, Eger; Referees: András Németh, Csaba Horváth

==== 2nd leg ====
May 18; 16:15 (UTC+2)	Report	Szolnoki Dózsa-Közgép	6–7	ZF-Eger	Tiszaligeti uszoda, Szolnok; Referees: Balázs Székely, ifj. György Juhász
May 18; 16:15 (UTC+2)	Report	Score by quarters: 3–2, 0–1, 1–3, 2–1			Tiszaligeti uszoda, Szolnok; Referees: Balázs Székely, ifj. György Juhász
May 18; 16:15 (UTC+2)	Report	Aleksić 3	Goals	Salamon 4	Tiszaligeti uszoda, Szolnok; Referees: Balázs Székely, ifj. György Juhász

==== 3rd leg ====
May 21; 18:30 (UTC+2)	Report	ZF-Eger	10–9	Szolnoki Dózsa-Közgép	Bitskey Aladár Sportuszoda, Eger; Referees: András Németh, György Kun
May 21; 18:30 (UTC+2)	Report	Score by quarters: 1–3, 4–1, 4–2, 1–3			Bitskey Aladár Sportuszoda, Eger; Referees: András Németh, György Kun
May 21; 18:30 (UTC+2)	Report	Bátori 3	Goals	Nyéki, Hosnyánszky, Gocić 2	Bitskey Aladár Sportuszoda, Eger; Referees: András Németh, György Kun

ZF-Eger won Championship final series 3–0.

== Final standing ==
Qualified for the 2013–14 LEN Champions League
Qualified for the 2013–14 LEN Euro Cup
Relegation to the 2013–14 OB I/B

Rank	Team
1st place, gold medalist(s)	ZF-Eger
2nd place, silver medalist(s)	Szolnoki Dózsa-KÖZGÉP
3rd place, bronze medalist(s)	A-HÍD Szeged
4	TEVA-Vasas
5	Debrecen
6	Grupama Honvéd
7	BVSC-Zugló
8	Szentes
9	Orvosegyetem SC
10	Hungary national junior water polo team
11	EKF-EgerFood-Imola
12	Széchenyi Bank-FTC
13	PVSK-Fűszért
14	Kaposvár

2012–13 OB I Champions
ZF-Eger
2nd Title

1 Zoltán Szécsi, 2 Willem Wouter Gerritse, 3 Bence Bátori, 4 Kevin Graham
5 Ferenc Salamon, 6 Gábor Kovács, 7 Tamás Mezei, 8 Zsolt Varga
9 Lukaš Seman, 10 Miklós Gór-Nagy, 11 Bálint Lőrincz
12 Erik Bundschuch, 13 Péter Biros (c), 14 Dávid Bisztritsányi
Head coach
György Gerendás
