= 2011–12 Országos Bajnokság I (men's water polo) =

Water polo season

OB I
- Season: 2011–12
- Champions: Vasas SC
- Relegated: PVSK-Füszért
- Top goalscorer: Weszelovky László (Szentesi VK)

The 2011–12 Országos Bajnokság I is the 106th season of the Országos Bajnokság I, Hungary's premier Water polo league.

== Teams ==
Location of teams in 2011–12 Nemzeti Bajnokság I

Club	City	Pool
BVSC-Zugló	Budapest	BVSC Sportuszoda
Debreceni Cívis Póló Vízilabda SE	Debrecen	Debrecen Swimming Pool Complex
FTC-Fischer Klíma	Budapest	Népliget Sportuszoda
Groupama Honvéd	Budapest	Kőér Street Swimming Pool
Kaposvári VK	Kaposvár	Kaposvári Sportuszoda
Kalo-Méh CS&K Szentesi VK	Szentes	Szentesi Üdülőközpont
Orvosegyetem SC	Budapest	Alfréd Hajós National Swimming Stadium
PVSK-Füszért	Pécs	Abay Nemes Oszkár Sportuszoda
A-Híd Szeged Beton VE	Szeged	Tiszaligeti Sportuszoda
Szolnoki Vízilabda SC	Szolnoki Dózsa-KÖZGÉP	Újszegedi Sportuszoda
TEVA-Vasas-UNIQA	Budapest	Komjádi Swimming Pool
ZF-Eger	Eger	Aladár Bistkey Swimming Pool

== Final standing ==
Qualified for the 2012–13 LEN Champions League
Qualified for the 2012–13 LEN Euro Cup

Rank	Team
1st place, gold medalist(s)	TEVA-Vasas-UNIQA
2nd place, silver medalist(s)	ZF-Eger
3rd place, bronze medalist(s)	A-Híd Szeged Beton
4	Grupama Honvéd
5	Debreceni VSE
6	Szolnoki Dózsa-KÖZGÉP
7	FTC-Fisher Klíma
8	Kalo-Méh CS&K Szentes
9	Kaposvár
10	Orvosegyetem SC
11	BVSC-Zugló
12	PVSK-Füszért

2011–12 OB I Champions
TEVA-Vasas-UNIQA
18th Title

1 Viktor Nagy, 2 Ádám Decker, 3 Miho Bošković, 4 Gergely Katonás
5 Tibor Fazekas, 6 Viktor Vörös, 7 Gergely Kiss, 8 Márton Vámos
9 Draško Brguljan, 10 Bence Fülöp, 11 Barnabás Steinmetz (c)
12 Bálint Takács, 13 Ádám Steinmetz, 14 Botond Barabás
Head coach
László Földi
