= 2014 Magyar Kupa (men's water polo) =

Water polo tournament season

Hungarian Cup

Tournament details
- Country: Hungary
- Teams: 16

Final positions
- Champions: Szolnoki Dózsa-KÖZGÉP (4th title)
- Runners-up: A-HÍD OSC Újbuda

Tournament statistics
- Top goal scorer(s): (Hungary) Dénes Varga (14 goals)

The 2014 Magyar Kupa, known as (Hungarian: Theodora Férfi Magyar Kupa for sponsorship reasons), is the 88th edition of the tournament.

== Quarter-finals ==
Quarter-final matches were played on 8 and 9 November 2014.

Team 1	Agg.	Team 2	1st leg	2nd leg
ZF-Eger (I)	27–18	VasasPlaket (I)	11–4	16–14
RacioNet Honvéd (I)	17–15	Ferencvárosi TC (I)	12–7	5–8
Tiszavirág Szeged Diapolo (I)	15–22	Szolnoki Dózsa-KÖZGÉP (I)	7–10	8–12
A-HÍD OSC Újbuda (I)	25–17	BVSC-Wáberer Hungária-Zugló (I)	14–8	11–9

== Final four ==
The final four will be held on 5 and 7 December 2014 at the Városi Sportuszoda in Szentes.

Semifinals
5 December, 17:45
RacioNet Honvéd	1
A-HÍD OSC Újbuda	8
5 December, 19:35
ZF-Eger	5
Szolnoki Dózsa-KÖZGÉP	6

Final
7 December, 19:00
A-HÍD OSC Újbuda	7
Szolnoki Dózsa-KÖZGÉP	10

=== Semi-finals ===
5 December 2014; 17:45 (CET)	Report	RacioNet Honvéd	1–8	A-HÍD OSC Újbuda	Városi sportuszoda, Szentes; Referees: Petik, Csizmadia
5 December 2014; 17:45 (CET)	Report	Score by quarters: 0–2, 0–0, 1–4, 0–2			Városi sportuszoda, Szentes; Referees: Petik, Csizmadia
5 December 2014; 17:45 (CET)	Report	Fazekas 1	Goals	Bátori, Kayes 2	Városi sportuszoda, Szentes; Referees: Petik, Csizmadia

5 December 2014; 19:35 (CET)	Report	ZF-Eger	5–6	Szolnoki Dózsa-KÖZGÉP	Városi sportuszoda, Szentes; Referees: Dodog, Németh
5 December 2014; 19:35 (CET)	Report	Score by quarters: 0–0, 0–2, 2–3, 3–1			Városi sportuszoda, Szentes; Referees: Dodog, Németh
5 December 2014; 19:35 (CET)	Report	Mi. Ćuk, Szívós 2	Goals	three players 2	Városi sportuszoda, Szentes; Referees: Dodog, Németh

=== Final ===
7 December 2014; 19:00 (CET)	Report	A-HÍD OSC Újbuda	7–10	Szolnoki Dózsa-KÖZGÉP	Városi sportuszoda, Szolnok; Attendance: 600; Referees: Kun, Székely
7 December 2014; 19:00 (CET)	Report	Score by quarters: 2–1, 0–2, 2–2, 3–5			Városi sportuszoda, Szolnok; Attendance: 600; Referees: Kun, Székely
7 December 2014; 19:00 (CET)	Report	Salamon, Kayes 2	Goals	four players 2	Városi sportuszoda, Szolnok; Attendance: 600; Referees: Kun, Székely

2014 Magyar Kupa
Winner

Szolnoki Dózsa-KÖZGÉP
4th title

1 Viktor Nagy, 2 Živko Gocić, 3 Norbert Madaras, 4 Márton Vámos, 5 Zoltán Hangay, 6 Tamás Mezei, 7 Milan Aleksić, 8 Márton Tóth, 9 Dániel Varga (c), 10 Dénes Varga, 11 Gábor Kis, 12 Stefan Mitrović, 13 Dávid Jansik, 14 Attila Decker
Head coach
ifj. Sándor Cseh

==== Final standings ====
	Team
	Szolnoki Dózsa-KÖZGÉP
Silver medal	A-HÍD OSC Újbuda
Bronze medal	ZF-Eger
Bronze medal	RacioNet Honvéd

== See also ==
- 2014–15 Országos Bajnokság I
