= 2007–08 Országos Bajnokság I (men's water polo) =

Water polo league season

OB I
- Season: 2007–08
- Champions: Vasas
- Euroleague: Vasas; Eger; Honvéd
- LEN Cup: Szeged; Újpest

2007–08 Országos Bajnokság I (men's water polo) was the 102nd water polo championship in Hungary.

== First stage ==
#	Team	M	W	D	L	G+	G−	P
1.	Domino-Bp. Honvéd	22	20	0	2	332	155	40
2.	Brendon-UPC-ZF-Egri VK	22	20	0	2	272	163	40
3.	Szeged-Beton VE	22	19	0	3	243	141	38
4.	TEVA-Vasas SC-Plaket	22	17	0	5	276	153	34
5.	Uniqa-Újpesti TE	22	12	1	9	205	208	25
6.	Ferencvárosi TC-Aprilia	22	11	1	10	207	186	23
7.	Pécsi VSK-Fűszért-Aquaprofit	22	8	1	13	202	228	17
8.	Pendola-Szentesi VK-Elektroglob	22	4	4	14	160	266	12
9.	Szolnoki Főiskola VSC	22	4	2	16	191	260	10
10.	OSC-Opus Via	22	3	3	16	170	253	9
11.	BVSC	22	4	1	17	155	244	9
12.	Androbau-Fehérvár Póló SE	22	3	1	18	140	296	7

Championship Playoff
European competition Playoff
Relegation Playoff

Pld - Played; W - Won; L - Lost; PF - Points for; PA - Points against; Diff - Difference; Pts - Points.

== Championship Playoff ==
Semifinals
1	Domino-Bp. Honvéd	9	8	11	11	9
4	TEVA-Vasas SC-Plaket	15	14	7	10	10
2	Brendon-UPC-ZF-Egri VK	9	7	9
3	Szeged-Beton VE	5	2	8

Final
4	TEVA-Vasas SC-Plaket	10	11	10	7
2	Brendon-UPC-ZF-Egri VK	11	7	7	6
Third place
1	Domino-Bp. Honvéd	13	12	–	–
3	Szeged-Beton VE	10	6	–	–

== European competition Playoff ==
Placement Semifinals
5	Uniqa-Újpesti TE	10	7	14
8	Pendola-Szentesi VK-Elektroglob	9	8	5
6	Ferencvárosi TC-Aprilia	8	10	12	8	13
7	Pécsi VSK-Fűszért-Aquaprofit	9	8	13	6	10

Fifth place
5	Uniqa-Újpesti TE	11	8	9	–	–
6	Ferencvárosi TC-Aprilia	9	10	6	–	–
Seventh place
8	Pendola-Szentesi VK-Elektroglob	10	9	–	–
7	Pécsi VSK-Fűszért-Aquaprofit	11	13	–	–

== Relegation Playoff ==
Placement Semifinals
9	Szolnoki Főiskola VSC	12	8	8	6
12	Androbau-Fehérvár Póló SE	15	10	7	7
10	OSC-Opus Via	5	4	5	6
11	BVSC	6	3	6	7

Ninth place
12	Androbau-Fehérvár Póló SE	9	9	10	–	–
11	BVSC	10	7	11	–	–
Relegation play-offs
9	Szolnoki Főiskola VSC	7	7	–	–
10	OSC-Opus Via	9	11	–	–

== Final standing ==
Qualified for the 2008–09 LEN Euroleague
Qualified for the 2008–09 LEN Cup

Rank	Team
1st place, gold medalist(s)	TEVA-VasasPlaket
2nd place, silver medalist(s)	Brendon-Fenstherm-ZF-Eger
3rd place, bronze medalist(s)	Domino-Honvéd
4	Szeged-Beton VE
5	Uniqa-Újpesti TE
6	Ferencvárosi TC-Aprilia
7	Pécsi VSK-Fűszért-Aquaprofit
8	Pendola-Szentesi VK-Elektroglob
9	BVSC
10	Androbau-Fehérvár Póló SE
11	OSC-Opus Via
12	Szolnoki Főiskola VSC

2007–08 OB I Champions
TEVA-VasasPlaket
15th Title

1 Viktor Nagy, 2 Bálint Takács, 3 Attila Kincses, 4 Gergely Katonás
5 Zoltán Mátyás, 6 Dávid Heinrich, 7 Róbert Kovács Csatlós, 8 Márton Tóth
9 Dénes Varga, 10 Dániel Varga, 11 Barnabás Steinmetz
12 Ádám Steinmetz, 13 Dávid Hőna, 14 György Jónás
Head coach
László Földi

== Sources ==
- Magyar sportévkönyv 2009
