= 2007 Magyar Kupa (men's water polo) =

Water polo tournament season

Tournament details
- Country: Hungary

Final positions
- Champions: Brendon-UPC-ZF-Eger
- Runner-up: Domino Honvéd

The 2007 Magyar Kupa, known as (Hungarian: vodafone Férfi Magyar Kupa for sponsorship reasons), is the 81st edition of the tournament.

== Final four ==
The final four was held on 29 and 30 December 2007 at the Szőnyi úti uszoda in Budapest.

Semifinals
29 December
Domino Honvéd	15
UNIQA-UTE	4
29 December
Brendon-UPC-ZF-Eger	8
FTC-Aprilia	6

Final
30 December
Domino Honvéd	6
Brendon-UPC-ZF-Eger	12

== Semi-finals ==
29 December	[ Report]	Domino Honvéd	15–4	UNIQA-UTE	Szőnyi úti uszoda, Budapest; Referees: Z. Székely, Gy. Kun
29 December	[ Report]	Score by quarters: 3–1, 4–1, 3–2, 5–0			Szőnyi úti uszoda, Budapest; Referees: Z. Székely, Gy. Kun
29 December	[ Report]	three players 3	Goals	Borsós 2	Szőnyi úti uszoda, Budapest; Referees: Z. Székely, Gy. Kun

29 December	[ Report]	Brendon-UPC-ZF-Eger	8–6	FTC-Aprilia	Szőnyi úti uszoda, Budapest; Referees: B. Fekete, B. Székely
29 December	[ Report]	Score by quarters: 1–2, 3–2, 1–1, 3–1			Szőnyi úti uszoda, Budapest; Referees: B. Fekete, B. Székely
29 December	[ Report]	Zs. Varga II 3	Goals	Persely, Kállay 2	Szőnyi úti uszoda, Budapest; Referees: B. Fekete, B. Székely

== Final ==
30 December	[ Report]	Domino Honvéd	6–12	Brendon-UPC-ZF-Eger	Szőnyi úti uszoda, Budapest; Referees: Kiszelly, Székely
30 December	[ Report]	Score by quarters: 3–2, 2–1, 1–3, 1–1 OT: 2–0, 0–1			Szőnyi úti uszoda, Budapest; Referees: Kiszelly, Székely
30 December	[ Report]	three players 2	Goals	Dé. Varga 5	Szőnyi úti uszoda, Budapest; Referees: Kiszelly, Székely

2007 Magyar Kupa
Winner
Brendon-UPC-ZF-Eger
2nd Title

== See also ==
- 2007–08 Országos Bajnokság I
