= Magyar Kupa (men's water polo) =

Water polo tournament

- Founded: 1923
- Region: Hungary
- Number of teams: 17 (2016-17)
- Current champions: Ferencváros (23rd title)
- Most successful club(s): Ferencváros (23 titles)
- Website: waterpolo.hu
- 2024

The Hungarian Cup (Hungarian: Magyar Kupa) is the Hungarian cup competition for water polo. It has been incepted by the Hungarian Water Polo Federation, the Magyar Vízilabda Szövetség in 1923, nineteen years after the commencement of the Hungarian League, the Országos Bajnokság.

Most successful participant in the Magya Kupa has been the Ferencváros with 23 titles, followed by the local rivals from Újpest with 19 cups. The current holders are Ferencváros.

== Winners ==
In 1923 the final was played only in the following year. In 1939 the Magyar AC, before the final came back, many of its players were disqualified or injured or busy at work. In 1996 they played two series (in March and December). Previous cup winners are:

- 1923: Ferencváros
- 1924: Ferencváros
- 1925: III. Kerületi TVE
- 1926: Ferencváros
- 1927: III. Kerületi TVE
- 1928: MTK Budapest
- 1929: Újpest
- 1930: III. Kerületi TVE
- 1931: Újpest
- 1932: Újpest
- 1933: Újpest
- 1934: Újpest
- 1935: Újpest
- 1936: Újpest
- 1937: MTK Budapest
- 1938: Újpest
- 1939: Újpest
- 1940: Magyar AC
- 1941: Budapest SE
- 1942: Budapest SE
- 1943: Magyar AC
- 1944: Újpest
- 1945: Not Played
- 1946: MTK Budapest
- 1947: Vasas
- 1948: Újpest
- 1949: Ferencváros
- 1950: Not Played
- 1951: Újpest
- 1952: Újpest
- 1953: Bp. Honvéd
- 1954: Bp. Honvéd
- 1955: Újpest
- 1956: Not Played
- 1957: Ferencváros
- 1958: Bp. Honvéd
- 1959: Bp. Honvéd
- 1960: Újpest
- 1961: Vasas
- 1962: Ferencváros
- 1963: Újpest
- 1964: Ferencváros
- 1965: Ferencváros
- 1966: Szolnok
- 1967: Ferencváros
- 1968: Szolnok
- 1969: Ferencváros
- 1970: OSC
- 1971: Vasas
- 1972: Eger
- 1973: Ferencváros
- 1974: OSC
- 1975: Újpest
- 1976: Ferencváros
- 1977: Ferencváros
- 1978: Ferencváros
- 1979: Bp. Honvéd
- 1980: Szentes
- 1981: Vasas
- 1982: BVSC
- 1983: Vasas
- 1984: Vasas
- 1985: Szolnok
- 1986/87: BVSC
- 1987/88: Bp. Spartacus
- 1988/89: Ferencváros
- 1989/90: Ferencváros
- 1990/91: Újpest
- 1991/92: Vasas
- 1992/93: Újpest
- 1993/94: Vasas
- 1994/95: BVSC
- 1995/96: Vasas
- 1996 dec.: Ferencváros
- 1997: Vasas
- 1998/99: Bp. Honvéd
- 1999/00: BVSC
- 2000/01: Vasas
- 2001/02: Vasas
- 2002/03: BVSC
- 2004: Vasas
- 2005: Vasas
- 2006: Bp. Honvéd
- 2007: Eger
- 2008: Eger
- 2009: Vasas
- 2010: Bp. Honvéd
- 2011: Szeged
- 2012: Szeged
- 2013: Szeged
- 2014: Szolnok
- 2015: Eger
- 2016: Szolnok
- 2017: Szolnok
- 2018: Ferencváros
- 2019: Ferencváros
- 2020: Ferencváros
- 2021: Ferencváros
- 2022: Ferencváros
- 2023: Ferencváros

=== Finals ===
The following table contains all the finals from the sixty years long history of the Magyar Kupa. In some occasions, there was not held a final match but a final tournament. In these cases, the team with the most total points have been crowned as cup winners.

Key
(R)	Replay
aet	Match went to extra time
p	Match decided by a penalty shootout after extra time
‡	Winning team won the Double

Finals of Hungarian Cup
No.	Season	Winners	Score	Runners-up	Pool	Date of final(s)
1st	1923	Ferencváros	2–1	III. Kerületi TVE	Csillaghegy Bath, Békásmegyer	9 June 1924
2nd	1924	Ferencváros	4−0	Magyar AC	Császár Bath, Budapest	8 September 1924
3rd	1925	III. Kerületi TVE	4−2	Ferencváros	Császár Bath, Budapest	29 August 1925
4th	1926	Ferencváros	4−1	MTK Budapest	Császár Bath, Budapest	25 September 1926
5th	1927	III. Kerületi TVE	6−1	Ferencváros	Császár Bath, Budapest	21 August 1927
6th	1928	MTK Budapest	6−2	III. Kerületi TVE	Császár Bath, Budapest	20 August 1928
7th	1929	Újpest	8−3	MTK Budapest	Császár Bath, Budapest	4 August 1929
8th	1930	III. Kerületi TVE	5−3	Magyar AC	Császár Bath, Budapest	7 September 1930
9th	1931	Újpest	7−1	MTK Budapest	National Swimming Stadium, Budapest	2 February 1931
10th	1932	Újpest	5−3	Magyar AC	National Swimming Stadium, Budapest	25 December 1932
11th	1933	Újpest	9−6 (aet)	MTK Budapest	National Swimming Stadium, Budapest	10 December 1933
12th	1934	Újpest	3−2	Magyar AC	Császár Bath, Budapest	1 July 1934
13th	1935	Újpest	4−3 (aet)	Magyar AC	National Swimming Stadium, Budapest	2 November 1935
14th	1936	Újpest	4−3	Magyar AC	National Swimming Stadium, Budapest	20 December 1936
15th	1937	MTK Budapest	4−3 (aet)	Magyar AC	National Swimming Stadium, Budapest	19 December 1937
16th	1938	Újpest	4−3	Magyar AC	National Swimming Stadium, Budapest	21 December 1938
17th	1939	Újpest	^{1}	Magyar AC	National Swimming Stadium, Budapest	17 December 1939
18th	1940	Magyar AC (7p)	5 roundmatches	Budapest SE (7p)	National Swimming Stadium, Budapest	22 December 1940
19th	1941	Budapest SE (7p)	5 roundmatches	Magyar AC (7p)	National Swimming Stadium, Budapest	21 December 1941
20th	1942	Budapest SE	2−0	Ferencváros	National Swimming Stadium, Budapest	16 August 1942
21st	1943	Magyar AC	5−2	Ferencváros	National Swimming Stadium, Budapest	22 August 1943
22nd	1944	Újpest	5−3	Ferencváros	National Swimming Stadium, Budapest	15 August 1944
No Competitions Held
23rd	1946	MTK Budapest	4−2	Ferencváros	National Swimming Stadium, Budapest	20 August 1946
24th	1947	Vasas	3−2	Újpest	National Swimming Stadium, Budapest	17 August 1947
25th	1948	Újpest	4−3	Vasas	National Swimming Stadium, Budapest	21 November 1948
26th	1949	Ferencváros	4−3	Vasas	National Swimming Stadium, Budapest	19 August 1949
No Competitions Held
27th	1951	Újpest	6−2	Ferenváros	National Swimming Stadium, Budapest	21 December 1951
28th	1952	Újpest	4−2	MTK Budapest	National Swimming Stadium, Budapest	21 December 1952
29th	1953	Bp. Honvéd	7−1	Vasas Ganzhajó	National Swimming Stadium, Budapest	20 December 1953
30th	1954	Bp. Honvéd	2−1	Szolnok	National Swimming Stadium, Budapest	19 December 1954
31st	1955	Újpest	5−4	Bp. Honvéd	National Swimming Stadium, Budapest	27 November 1955
No Competitions Held
32nd	1957	Ferencváros (5p)	4 roundmatches	Bp. Honvéd (4p)	National Swimming Stadium, Budapest	15 December 1957
33rd	1958	Bp. Honvéd	4−3	BVSC	National Swimming Stadium, Budapest	21 December 1958
34th	1959	Bp. Honvéd	4−3	BVSC	National Swimming Stadium, Budapest	20 December 1959
35th	1960	Újpest	4−3	Bp. Honvéd	National Swimming Stadium, Budapest	18 December 1960
36th	1961	Vasas	2−1	Bp. Honvéd	National Swimming Stadium, Budapest	17 December 1961
37th	1962	Ferencváros (6p)	4 roundmatches	Újpest (4p)	National Swimming Stadium, Budapest	16 December 1962
38th	1963	Újpest (5p)	4 roundmatches	Ferencváros (4p)	National Swimming Stadium, Budapest	19 December 1963
39th	1964	Ferencváros (6p)	4 roundmatches	Bp. Honvéd (4p)	National Swimming Stadium, Budapest	20 December 1964
40th	1965	Ferencváros (6p)	4 roundmatches	Bp. Honvéd (4p)	National Swimming Stadium, Budapest	12 December 1965
41st	1966	Szolnok	2−1	Bp. Honvéd	National Swimming Stadium, Budapest	15 October 1966
42nd	1967	Ferencváros (6p)	4 roundmatches	Bp. Spartacus (3p)	National Swimming Stadium, Budapest	26 November 1967
43rd	1968	Szolnok (6p)	4 roundmatches	OSC (4p)	National Swimming Stadium, Budapest	8 December 1968
44th	1969	Ferencváros (6p)	4 roundmatches	Újpest (2p)	National Swimming Stadium, Budapest	14 December 1969
45th	1970	OSC	4−3	Eger	National Swimming Stadium, Budapest	19 December 1970
46th	1971	Vasas	4−3	Ferencváros	National Swimming Stadium, Budapest	20 August 1971
47th	1972	Eger	7−6	Ferencváros	Bitskey Aladár Swimming Pool, Eger	1 October 1972
48th	1973	Ferencváros	4−1	OSC	National Swimming Stadium, Budapest	4 November 1973
49th	1974	OSC (6p)	4 roundmatches	Újpest (2p)	National Swimming Stadium, Budapest	20 October 1974
50th	1975	Újpest (6p)	4 roundmatches	Vasas (4p)	National Swimming Stadium, Budapest	12 October 1975
51st	1976	Ferencváros (8p)	6 roundmatches	Újpest (6p)	Császár-Komjádi Swimming Pool, Budapest	12 December 1976
52nd	1977	Ferencváros (10p)	6 roundmatches	BVSC (6p)	Császár-Komjádi Swimming Pool, Budapest	25–27 November 1977
53rd	1978	Ferencváros	7−6 (aet)	Bp. Spartacus	Császár-Komjádi Swimming Pool, Budapest	26 November 1978
54th	1979	Bp. Honvéd	7−6 (p)	Ferencváros	Császár-Komjádi Swimming Pool, Budapest	25 November 1979
55th	1980	Szentes	6−5	Szegedi EOL	Császár-Komjádi Swimming Pool, Budapest	23 November 1980
56th	1981	Vasas	13−10	Orvosegyetem	Császár-Komjádi Swimming Pool, Budapest	22 November 1981
57th	1982	BVSC	9−7	Bp. Honvéd	Császár-Komjádi Swimming Pool, Budapest	15 December 1982
58th	1983	Vasas	9−8	BVSC	Császár-Komjádi Swimming Pool, Budapest	10 December 1983
59th	1984	Vasas	14−11	BVSC	Császár-Komjádi Swimming Pool, Budapest	9 December 1984
60th	1985	Szolnok	9−7	Vasas	Császár-Komjádi Swimming Pool, Budapest	8 December 1985
61st	1986–87	BVSC	10−9	Bp. Spartacus	Császár-Komjádi Swimming Pool, Budapest	22 March 1987
62nd	1987–88	Bp. Spartacus	12−10	Tungsram	Császár-Komjádi Swimming Pool, Budapest	13 March 1988
63rd	1988–89	Ferencváros	14−10	Tatabánya	Császár-Komjádi Swimming Pool, Budapest	5 March 1989
64th	1989–90	Ferencváros	8−5	Újpest	Császár-Komjádi Swimming Pool, Budapest	15 March 1990
65th	1990–91	Újpest	32–25; 16–9 / 16–16	Ferencváros	Császár-Komjádi Swimming Pool, Budapest	13 March 1991; 15 March 1991
66th	1991–92	Vasas	24–23; 11–13 / 13–10	Újpest	Császár-Komjádi Swimming Pool, Budapest	13 March 1992; 14 March 1992
67th	1992–93	Újpest	19–18; 10–7 / 9–11	Vasas	Alfréd Hajós National Swimming Stadium, Budapest; Császár-Komjádi Swimming Pool, Budapest	13 March 1993; 15 March 1993
68th	1993–94	Vasas	15–14; 5–6 / 10–8	Újpest	Császár-Komjádi Swimming Pool, Budapest	12 March 1994; 14 March 1994
69th	1994–95	BVSC	17–16; 13–8 / 4–8	Vasas	Szőnyi str. Swimming Pool, Budapest; Császár-Komjádi Swimming Pool, Budapest	9 March 1995; 15 March 1995
70th	1995–96	Vasas	10−8	Újpest	Császár-Komjádi Swimming Pool, Budapest	15 March 1996
71st	1996 dec.	Ferencváros	16–14; 7–6 / 9–8	Vasas	Császár-Komjádi Swimming Pool, Budapest	20 December 1996; 22 December 1996
72nd	1997	Vasas	6−4	Ferencváros	Császár-Komjádi Swimming Pool, Budapest	26 October 1997
73rd	1998–99	Bp. Honvéd	14–13; 7–6 / 7–7	Ferencváros	Kőér str. Swimming Pool, Budapest; Császár-Komjádi Swimming Pool, Budapest	11 March 1999; 12 March 1999
74th	1999–00	BVSC	8−6	Vasas	Császár-Komjádi Swimming Pool, Budapest	14 March 2000
75th	2000–01	Vasas	7−5	Szeged	Bitskey Aladár Swimming Pool, Eger	18 March 2001
76th	2001–02	Vasas	9−8 (aet)	Ferencváros	Szőnyi str. Swimming Poll, Budapest	17 March 2002
77th	2002–03	BVSC	7−6	Vasas	Császár-Komjádi Swimming Pool, Budapest	8 March 2003
78th	2004	Vasas	7−5	Eger	Bitskey Aladár Swimming Pool, Eger	10 October 2004
79th	2005	Vasas	13−12	Eger	Császár-Komjádi Swimming Pool, Budapest	25 September 2005
80th	2006	Bp. Honvéd	11−7	Vasas	Debrecen Swimming Pool Complex, Debrecen	15 October 2006
81st	2007	Eger	12−6	Bp. Honvéd	Szőnyi str. Swimming Pool, Budapest	30 December 2007
82nd	2008	Eger	9−8 (aet)	Vasas	Bitskey Aladár Swimming Pool, Eger	30 November 2008
83rd	2009	Vasas	14−13 (aet)	Eger	Szőnyi str. Swimming Pool, Budapest	22 November 2009
84th	2010	Bp. Honvéd	9−6	Eger	Szőnyi str. Swimming Pool, Budapest	30 November 2010
85th	2011	Szeged	9−8	Bp. Honvéd	Szőnyi str. Swimming Pool, Budapest	13 November 2011
86th	2012	Szeged	9−8 (aet)	Szolnok	Császár-Komjádi Swimming Pool, Budapest	11 November 2012
87th	2013	Szeged	9−5	Szolnok	Vizilabda Aréna, Szolnok	17 November 2013
88th	2014	Szolnok	10−7	OSC	Municipal Swimming Pool, Szentes	7 December 2014
89th	2015	Eger	8−8 (5-4 p)	Szolnok	Bitskey Aladár Swimming Pool, Eger	13 December 2015
90th	2016	Szolnok	10−4	Eger	Tüskecsarnok Swimming Pool, Budapest	18 December 2016
91st	2017	Szolnok	13−4	OSC	Császár-Komjádi Swimming Pool, Budapest	4 December 2017
92nd	2018	Ferencváros	13−4	Miskolc	Császár-Komjádi Swimming Pool, Budapest	16 December 2018
93rd	2019	Ferencváros	8−7	OSC	Császár-Komjádi Swimming Pool, Budapest	8 December 2019
94th	2020	Ferencváros	13−13 (6-5 p)	Szolnok	Alfréd Hajós National Swimming Stadium, Budapest	27 September 2020
95th	2021	Ferencváros	12−9	Szolnok	Lővér Swimming Pool, Sopron	11 December 2021

Notes

- Note 1: Újpest did not play

== Performances ==
=== By club ===
The performance of various clubs is shown in the following table:

Club	Titles	Runners-up	Winning years
Ferencváros (Note: Includes Bp. Kinizsi.)	**23**	15	1923, 1924, 1926, 1949, 1957, 1962, 1964, 1965, 1967, 1969, 1973, 1976, 1977, 1978, 1988–89, 1989–90, 1996 dec., 2018, 2019, 2020, 2021, 2022, 2023
Újpest (Note: Includes Bp. Dózsa and Újpesti Dózsa.)	**19**	9	1929, 1931, 1932, 1933, 1934, 1935, 1936, 1938, 1939, 1944, 1948, 1951, 1952, 1955, 1960, 1963, 1975, 1990–91, 1992–93
Vasas	**15**	11	1947, 1961, 1971, 1981, 1983, 1984, 1991–92, 1993–94, 1995–96, 1997, 2000–01, 2001–02, 2004, 2005, 2009
Bp. Honvéd (Note: Includes Honvéd-Spartacus VE.)	**8**	9	1953, 1954, 1958, 1959, 1979, 1998–99, 2006, 2010
Szolnok (Note: Includes Szolnoki Dózsa and Szolnoki Vízügy.)	**6**	4	1966, 1968, 1985, 2014, 2016, 2017
BVSC	**5**	5	1982, 1986–87, 1994–95, 1999–00, 2002–03
Eger (Note: Includes Egri Dózsa and ZF-Eger.)	**4**	6	1972, 2007, 2008, 2015
MTK Budapest (Note: Includes Bp. Bástya.)	**3**	5	1928, 1937, 1946
III. Kerületi TVE	**3**	2	1925, 1927, 1930
Szeged	**3**	1	2011, 2012, 2013
Magyar AC	**2**	10	1940, 1943
OSC	**2**	5	1970, 1974
Budapest SE	**2**	1	1941, 1942
Bp. Spartacus	**1**	3	1987–88
Szentes (Note: Includes Szentesi Vízügy.)	**1**	0	1980
Vasas Ganzhajó	–	1	-
Szegedi EOL	–	1	-
Tungsram	–	1	-
Tatabánya (Note: Includes Tatabányai Bányász.)	–	1	-

=== By county ===
County	Titles	Winning clubs
Budapest	83	**Ferencváros** (23), Újpest (19), **Vasas** (15), **Honvéd** (8), **BVSC** (5), III. Kerületi TVE (3), MTK (3), BSE (2), MAC (2), **OSC** (2), Spartacus (1)
Jász-Nagykun-Szolnok	6	**Szolnok** (6)
Csongrád	4	Szeged (3), **Szentes** (1)
Heves	4	**Eger** (4)

- The bolded teams are currently playing in the 2018-19 season of the Hungarian League.

== Statistics ==
=== Records in the Final ===
- Most wins: 23
  - Ferencváros (1923, 1924, 1926, 1949, 1957, 1962, 1964, 1965, 1967, 1969, 1973, 1976, 1977, 1978, 1988–89, 1989–90, 1996, 2018, 2019, 2020, 2021, 2022, 2023)
- Most consecutive titles: 6
  - Újpest (1931, 1932, 1933, 1934, 1935, 1936)
  - Ferencváros (2018, 2019, 2020, 2021, 2022, 2023)
- Most consecutive appearances: 8
  - Magyar AC (1934, 1935, 1936, 1937, 1938, 1939, 1940, 1941 - winning one)
- Most appearances: 38
  - Ferencváros (1923, 1924, 1925, 1926, 1927, 1942, 1943, 1944, 1946, 1949, 1951, 1957, 1962, 1963, 1964, 1965, 1967, 1969, 1971, 1972, 1973, 1976, 1977, 1978, 1979, 1989, 1990, 1991, 1996 dec., 1997, 1999, 2002, 2018, 2019, 2020, 2021, 2022, 2023)
- Biggest win:
  - Szolnok 13–4 OSC (2017)
- Most goals in a final: 27
  - Vasas 14–13 (a.e.t.) Eger (2009)
- Most goals by a losing side: 13
  - Vasas 14–13 (a.e.t.) Eger (2009)
- Most defeats in a final: 15
  - Ferencváros (1925, 1927, 1942, 1943, 1944, 1946, 1951, 1963, 1971, 1972, 1979, 1991, 1997, 1999, 2002)

=== Finals venues and host cities ===
Host cities of the Magyar Kupa
- In the list below are included all the stadiums, inclusive the stadiums from finals with 2 legs.

Matches played	City	Pool	Last final
41	Budapest	Hajós Alfréd Nemzeti Sportuszoda ^{1}	1993
40	Budapest	Császár-Komjádi Béla Sportuszoda ^{2}	2017
6	Budapest	Szőnyi úti uszoda	2011
5	Eger	Bitskey Aladár uszoda	2015
1	Békásmegyer	Csillaghegyi strandfürdő	1923
1	Budapest	Kőér utcai uszoda	1999
1	Budapest	Tüskecsarnok uszoda	2016
1	Debrecen	Debreceni Sportuszoda	2006
1	Szolnok	Tiszaligeti uszoda	2013
1	Szentes	Városi Sportuszoda (Szentes)	2014

Notes:

- Note 1: Formerly known as Nemzeti Sportuszoda.
- Note 2: Formerly known as Császár fürdő.

== Sponsorship ==
Period	Sponsor	Name
2009 – 2014	Theodora	Theodora férfi Magyar kupa
2015 –	BENU	BENU férfi Magyar kupa

== See also ==
- Országos Bajnokság I (National Championship of Hungary)
