= Aljoša Kunac =

Croatian water polo player

Personal information
- Born: 18 August 1980 (age 45) Split, Yugoslavia

Sport
- Sport: Water polo
Medal record
Representing Croatia
World Championship
Gold medal – first place	2007 Melbourne	Team competition

Aljoša Kunac (born 18 August 1980) is a Croatian water polo player who competed in the 2008 Summer Olympics.

== See also ==
- List of world champions in men's water polo
- List of World Aquatics Championships medalists in water polo
