= Balázs Vincze =

Hungarian water polo player

Personal information
- Nationality: Hungarian
- Born: 27 June 1967 (age 59) Budapest, Hungary

Sport
- Sport: Water polo
Medal record
Representing Hungary
World Championships
Silver medal – second place	1998 Perth	Team competition
Bronze medal – third place	1986 Madrid	Team competition
European Championships
Gold medal – first place	1997 Seville	Team competition
Gold medal – first place	1999 Florence	Team competition
Silver medal – second place	1993 Sheffield	Team competition
Silver medal – second place	1995 Vienna	Team competition

Balázs Vincze (born 27 June 1967) is a Hungarian water polo player. He competed at the 1988 Summer Olympics, the 1992 Summer Olympics and the 1996 Summer Olympics.

== See also ==
- List of World Aquatics Championships medalists in water polo
