= Balázs Erdélyi =

Hungarian water polo player

Personal information
- Nickname: Bazsi
- Nationality: Hungarian
- Born: 16 February 1990 (age 36) Eger, Hungary
- Height: 1.96 m (6 ft 5 in)
- Weight: 94 kg (207 lb)

Sport
- Sport: Water polo
- Handedness: Right
- Position: Wing
- Current club: Savona

Youth career
- Years: Team
- –: Eger

Senior clubs
- Years: Team
- –2010: Eger
- 2010–2014: Pacific Tigers
- 2014–2017: Eger
- 2017–2021: OSC-Újbuda
- 2021–2023: Vasas
- 2023–present: Savona
National team
- Years: Team
- 2015–: Hungary
Medal record
Men's water polo
Representing Hungary
Olympic Games
Bronze medal – third place	2020 Tokyo	Team
World Championships
Silver medal – second place	2017 Budapest	Team
European Championship
Gold medal – first place	2020 Budapest
Silver medal – second place	2014 Budapest
Bronze medal – third place	2016 Belgrade
Universiade
Gold medal – first place	2013 Kazan	Team
- Updated on 2 August 2023

Balázs Erdélyi (born 16 February 1990) is a water polo player from Hungary. He was part of the Hungarian team at the 2016 Summer Olympics, where the team was eliminated in the quarterfinals. He was also part of the Hungarian team at the 2020 Tokyo Olympics where he won a bronze medal.

Erdélyi played college water polo at the University of the Pacific, where he won back-to-back Cutino Awards (best player in college water polo) and helped Pacific establish itself as a top-tier program.

== See also ==
- Hungary men's Olympic water polo team records and statistics
- List of World Aquatics Championships medalists in water polo
