= Ádám Decker =

Hungarian water polo player

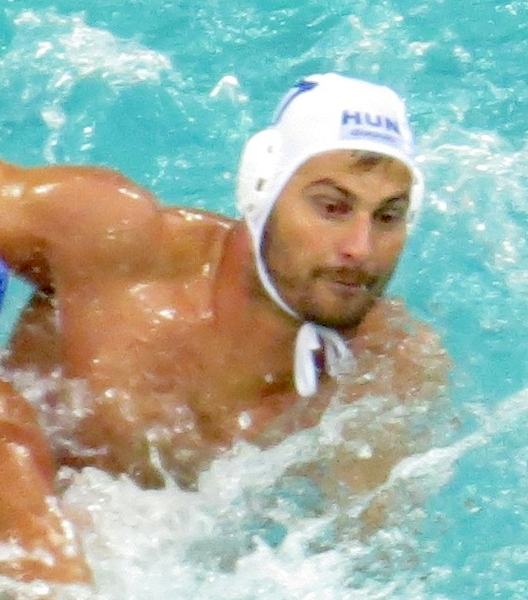
- Ádám Decker at the 2016 Olympics

Personal information
- Nationality: Hungarian
- Born: 29 February 1984 (age 42) Budapest, Hungary
- Height: 203 cm (80 in)

Sport
- Sport: Water polo
- Handedness: Right

Youth career
- Years: Team
- 1992–: BVSC

Senior clubs
- Years: Team
- –2004: BVSC
- 2004–2009: Eger
- 2009–2012: Vasas
- 2012–2014: Szeged
- 2014–2016: OSC-Újbuda
- 2016–2020: Eger
- 2020–2022: Bp. Honvéd
National team
Years	Team	Apps
2012–2017	Hungary	101
Medal record
Representing Hungary
Men's water polo
World Championships
Gold medal – first place	2013 Barcelona	Team
Silver medal – second place	2017 Budapest	Team
European Championship
Silver medal – second place	2014 Budapest
Bronze medal – third place	2016 Belgrade
- Updated on 2 August 2023

Ádám Decker (born 29 February 1984) is a Hungarian male water polo player. He is part of the Hungary men's national water polo team. He won a gold medal at the 2013 World Championships. He is the older brother of Attila Decker water polo player.

== See also ==
- List of world champions in men's water polo
- List of World Aquatics Championships medalists in water polo
