= Joe Kayes =

New Zealand-Australian water polo player

Personal information
- Born: 3 January 1991 (age 35) New Zealand

Sport
- Sport: Water polo

Joseph Henry Kayes (born 3 January 1991) is a professional water polo player.

He is of Samoan descent through his mother, as both his maternal grandparents were born in Samoa.

Kayes played for the NZ Senior Men's Water Polo team in 2008. In 2009, he went to Perth where he played for the Fremantle Mariners Men's Water Polo team which won the Australian National League.

In October 2009, he was playing water polo as a full professional at the Szeged club in Hungary where he stayed for four seasons. He was mentored as a Centre Forward by Tamas Molnar, a three time Olympic gold medal winner for Hungary. Joe won 2 Hungarian Cup Gold medals with Szeged along with 3 bronze medals in the Hungarian National League.

In 2014, he played again for Fremantle Mariners in Australia. 2014/2015 – he now plays for OSC in Budapest, once again in the Hungarian National League.

In 2015, he obtained Australian citizenship and was then approved to play for Australia men's national water polo team at the 2016 Summer Olympics.
