= Pécsi VSK (men's water polo) =

Polo Club

PVSK-Mecsek Füszért
- Full name: Pécsi Vasutas Sportkör
- Founded: 1926; 100 years ago (parent club in 1919)
- League: Országos Bajnokság I
- Based in: Pécs, Hungary
- Arena: Abay Nemes Oszkár Sportuszoda
- Colors: Black and white
- President: István Czerpán
- Head coach: Attila Petik
- 2021–22: Országos Bajnokság I, 8th of 14
- Website: pecsivizilabda.hu

Pécsi Vasutas Sportkör is a water polo club from Pécs, Hungary. The team competes in the Országos Bajnokság I.

== Team ==
Squad for the 2015–16 season
#	Name	Position	Date of birth
1	(Hungary) Zsolt Györke		12 March 1986 (age 40)
	(Hungary) Ferenc Ambrus		9 December 1986 (age 39)
	(Hungary) Miklós Csapó		21 January 1993 (age 33)
	(Hungary) Károly Czigány		31 October 1984 (age 41)
	(Hungary) Péter Kovács		16 May 1991 (age 35)
	(Hungary) Krisztián Létay		9 February 1983 (age 43)
	(Hungary) Norbert Mátyók		15 June 1996 (age 30)
	(Hungary) Álmos Dániel Nagy		16 May 1996 (age 30)
	(Hungary) Sándor Nagy		2 November 1986 (age 39)
10	(Hungary) Mátyás Pásztor		20 February 1987 (age 39)
11	(Hungary) Bence Szabó	Center	29 February 1996 (age 30)
12	(Hungary) Bendegúz Szabó		12 May 1994 (age 32)
13	(Hungary) Béla Török		23 March 1990 (age 36)
14	(Hungary) Dániel Szakonyi		1 March 1994 (age 32)
Coach : (Hungary) Gergely Lukács

=== Squad changes for the 2015-16 season ===
==== In ====
- (Hungary) Erik Csacsovszky (from Honvéd)
- (Hungary) László Surányi (from Kaposvár)
- (Hungary) Patrik Macsi (from UVSE)
- (Serbia) Zlatko Rakonjac (from Szentes)
- (Serbia) Ivan Basara (from Radnički Kragujevac)

==== Out ====
Squad for the 2013–14 season

Νο.	Player	Position
1	(Hungary) Ferenc Baráth	Goalkeeper
2	(Hungary) Tamás Somogyi	Guard
3	(Hungary) Tamás Kuncz	
4	(Hungary) Richárd Besenyei	
5	(Hungary) Gergely Hoppál	
6	(Hungary) Zoltán Ágnes	
7	(Hungary) Gergely Pataki	
8	(Hungary) Károly Czigány	
9	(Hungary) Károly Kráczky	
10	(Hungary) Müller Máté	
11	(Hungary) András Krizsán	
12	(Hungary) Alex Csacsovszky	
13	(Italy) Domenico De Blasio	
14	(Hungary) Bernát Tihanyi	Goalkeeper
Coach (Hungary) Attila Petik

== Recent seasons ==
As of 23 May 2018.

=== Rankings in OB I ===
P.	06	07	08	09	10	11	12	13	14	15	16	17	18	19
1														
2														
3														
4														
5		5												
6														
7			7	7		7								
8														
9	9				9									9
10									10				10	
11														
12							12					12		
13								13						
14										14	14			

=== In European competition ===
- Participations in Euro Cup (LEN Cup): 1x

Season	Competition	Round	Club	Home	Away	Aggregate
2007-08	LEN Cup	elimination in Second qualifying round				

== Notable former players ==
=== Olympic champions ===
- Zoltán Kósz (2004–2007) - 3 year 2000 Sydney
- Attila Vári (2009–2011) - 2 year 2000 Sydney, 2004 Athens

== Coaches ==
- (Hungary) Tamás Ambrus (2004 – 2010)
- (Hungary) Attila Petik (2010 – 2013)
- (Hungary) Miklós Bereczki (2013 – 2015)
- (Hungary) Gergely Lukács (2015 – present)
