= Kaposvári VK =

- Full name: Kaposvári Vizilabda Klub
- Founded: 1999; 27 years ago
- League: Országos Bajnokság I
- Based in: Kaposvár, Hungary
- Arena: Virágfürdő
- Colors: Brown and orange
- President: Pál Dobos
- Head coach: László Surányi
- 2021–22: Országos Bajnokság I, 9th of 14
- Website: kapospolo.hu

Kaposvári Vizilabda Klub is a water polo club from Kaposvár, Hungary. The team competes in the Országos Bajnokság I.

== Team ==
Squad for the 2020–21 season
#	Name	Position	Date of birth
2	(Hungary) Sámuel Palotás		29 May 1996 (age 30)
3	(Hungary) Olivér Kovács		4 December 1981 (age 44)
4	(Hungary) Szabolcs Józsa		15 March 1996 (age 30)
5	(Hungary) József Berta		12 February 1994 (age 32)
6	(Hungary) Ádám Győrbíró		23 June 1996 (age 29)
7	(Serbia) Nikola Nikolov		7 February 1994 (age 32)
8	(Hungary) Dávid Dobos		29 August 1996 (age 29)
9	(Serbia) Mihailo Parezanović		5 March 1992 (age 34)
10	(Hungary) Ferenc Vindisch		28 February 1979 (age 47)
11	(Hungary) Norbert Juhász-Szelei		9 March 1992 (age 34)
12	(Hungary) Máté Sántavy		20 March 1989 (age 37)
13	(Slovakia) (Hungary) Krisztián Polovic		19 March 1992 (age 34)
14	(Hungary) Balázs Krémer	Goalkeeper	11 August 1995 (age 30)
Coach : (Hungary) Szilveszter Fekete

=== Technical staff ===
- (Hungary) Head Coach: Szilveszter Fekete

=== Squad changes for the 2015-16 season ===
In

- (Slovakia) (Hungary) Krisztián Polovic ( from PVSK )
- (Serbia) Nikola Nikolov ( from (France) Pays d'Aix )
- (Hungary) Norbert Juhász-Szelei ( from Vasas )

Out

- (Hungary) Zoltán Ágner ( to Fehérvár Póló )
- (Canada) (Hungary) Gros Ronen ( to MVLC )
- (Australia) Jeremy Davie ( to (Australia) )
- (Canada) Oliver Vikalo ( to (Canada) )
- (Hungary) László Surányi ( to PVSK )

== Recent seasons ==
As of 23 May 2018.

=== Rankings in OB I ===
P.	12	13	14	15	16	17	18	19
7				7				
8			8					
9	9						9	
10						10		
11					11			
12								
13								
14		14						14

== Notable former players ==
- Zoltán Szécsi ( 2000 Sydney, 2004 Athens, 2008 Beijing ) 13-
