= Szentesi VK =

Hungarian water polo club

- Founded: 1934
- League: Hungarian First League
- Based in: Szentes
- Arena: Szentesi Üdülőközpont, Szentes
- Colors
- Championships: Women: 1 European Cup; 11 Hungarian Leagues
- Website: szentesivk.hu

Szentesi Vízilabda Klub, a.k.a. Hungerit-Metalcom Szentesi for sponsorship reasons, is a Hungarian water polo club from Szentes. Founded in 1934, it is best known for its women's team, which won the 1993 European Cup and subsequently won a record seven national championships in a row.

== Titles ==
- LEN Women's Champions' Cup
  - Winner (1): 1993
- Hungarian First League
  - Winner (11) - record: 1987, 1990, 1992, 1994, 1995, 1996, 1997, 1998, 1999, 2000, 2014
- Danube League
  - Winner (2): 2019, 2022
