= Miklós Ambrus =

Hungarian water polo player (1933–2019)

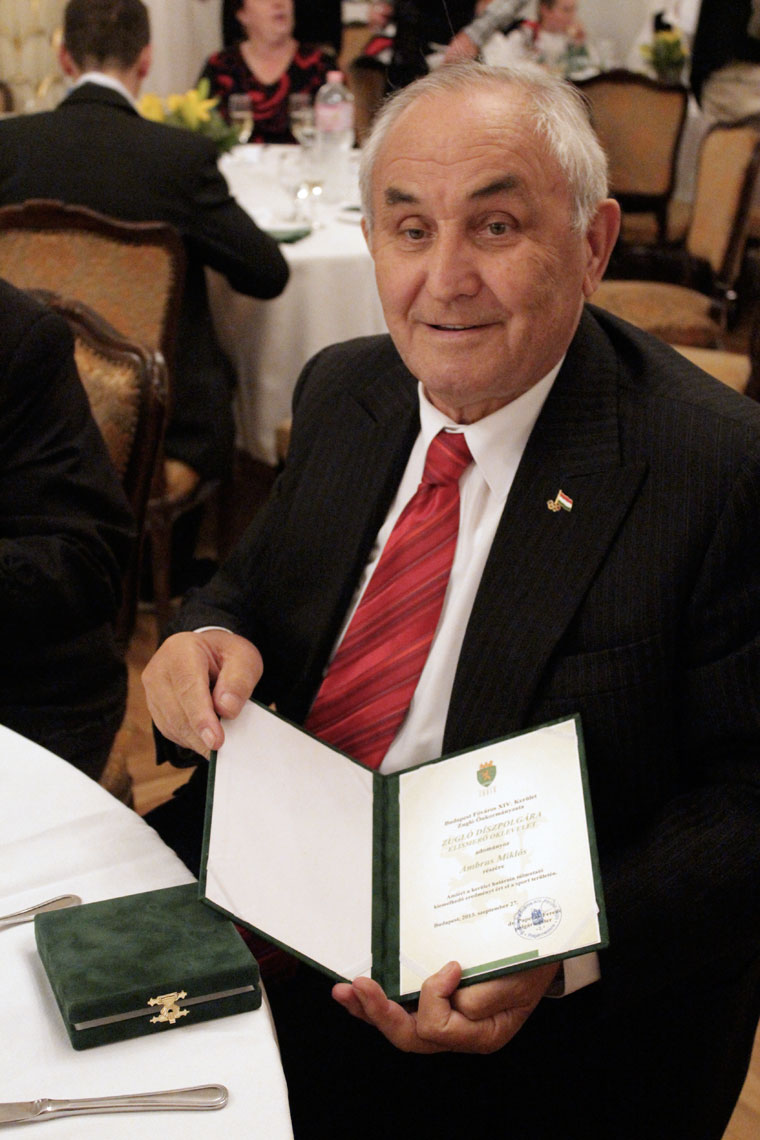
- Miklós Ambrus in 2013

Personal information
- Born: 31 May 1933 Eger, Hungary
- Died: 3 August 2019 (aged 86) Budapest
- Height: 185 cm (6 ft 1 in)
- Weight: 90 kg (198 lb)

Sport
- Sport: Water polo
- Club: Ferencvárosi TC
Medal record
Representing Hungary
Olympic Games
Gold medal – first place	1964 Tokyo	Team competition
European Championship
Gold medal – first place	1962 Leipzig	Team competition
Summer Universiade
Bronze medal – third place	1961 Sofia	Team competition

Miklós Ambrus (31 May 1933 – 3 August 2019) was a Hungarian water polo player, born in Eger who competed in the 1964 Summer Olympics.

== Honours ==
=== National team ===
Olympic Games: 1 time present at the Olympic Games

- 1964 Tokyo

European Championship:

- 1962 Leipzig

Universiade:

- 1961 Sofia

55 present in the national team of Hungary

=== Club ===
Egeri Fáklya - As player of Eger (1950–1953)

Bp. Kinizsi / Ferencváros - As player of FTC (1953–1956 and 1959–1968)

- OB I (5x): 1956, 1962, 1963, 1965, 1968
- Magyar Kupa (4x): 1962, 1964, 1965, 1967

Melbourne Swimming Club - As player of Melbourne SC (1956–1958)

== See also ==
- Hungary men's Olympic water polo team records and statistics
- List of Olympic champions in men's water polo
- List of Olympic medalists in water polo (men)
- List of men's Olympic water polo tournament goalkeepers
