= László Felkai =

Hungarian water polo player

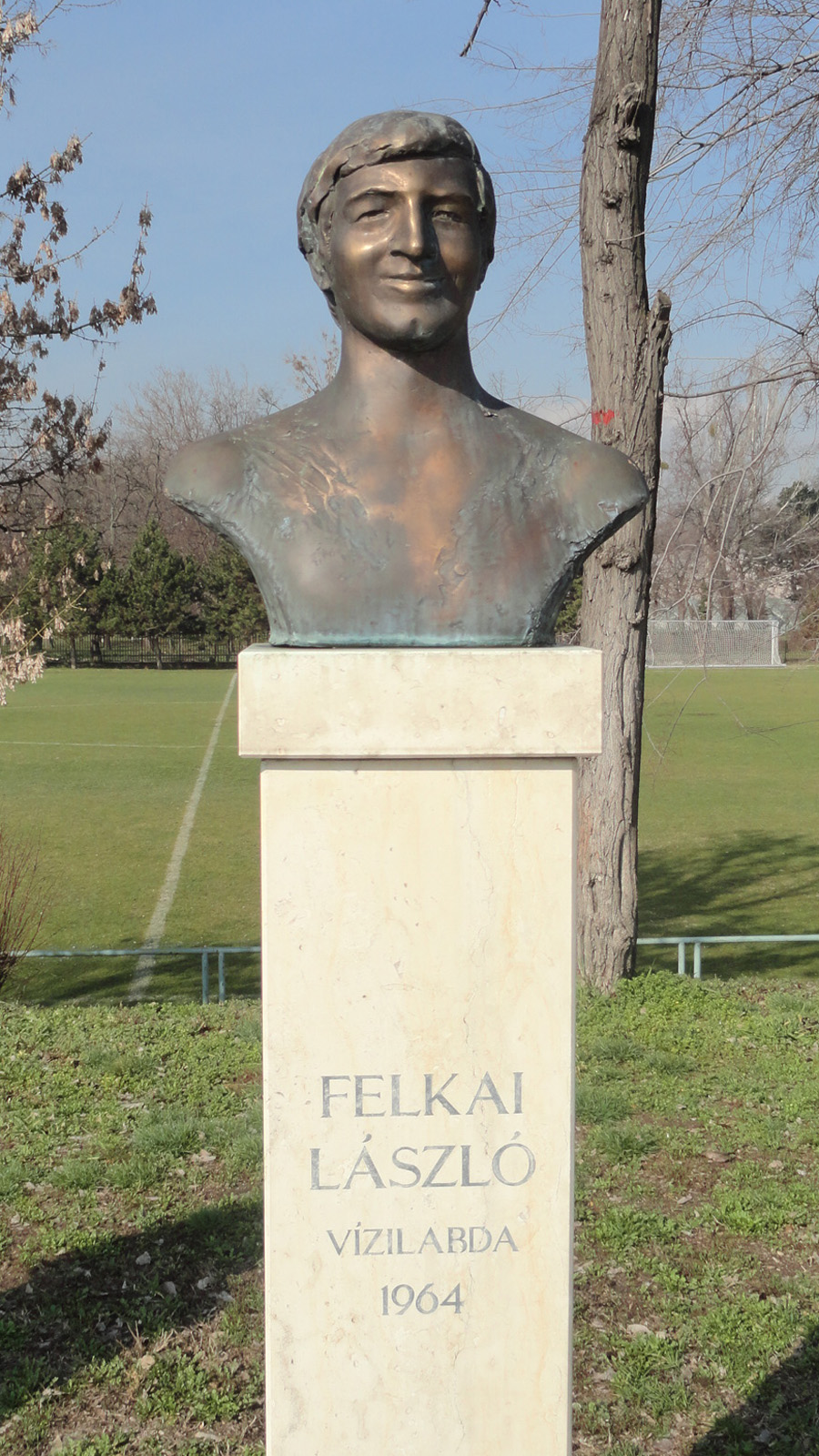
- Felkai László.

Personal information
- Born: 1 March 1941 Budapest, Hungary
- Died: 10 April 2014 (aged 73) Budapest, Hungary
- Height: 180 cm (5 ft 11 in)
- Weight: 76 kg (168 lb)

Sport
- Sport: Water polo
- Club: Ferencvárosi TC
Medal record
Men's Water Polo
Representing Hungary
Olympic Games
Bronze medal – third place	1960 Rome	Team competition
Gold medal – first place	1964 Tokyo	Team competition
Bronze medal – third place	1968 Mexico City	Team competition

László Felkai (1 March 1941 – 10 April 2014) was a Hungarian water polo player and breaststroke swimmer who competed in the 1960 Summer Olympics, in the 1964 Summer Olympics, and in the 1968 Summer Olympics.

He was born in Budapest.

Felkai was part of the Hungarian water polo team which won the bronze medal in the 1960 tournament. He played three matches and scored four goals. He also participated in the 200 metre breaststroke competition but was eliminated in the first round.

Four years later he was a member of the Hungarian team which won the gold medal in the 1964 Olympic tournament. He played all six matches and scored six goals.

At the 1968 Games he won his second bronze medal with the Hungarian team. He played all eight matches and scored 24 goals.

== Honours ==
=== National team ===
Olympic Games: 3 time present at the Olympic Games

- 1964 Tokyo
- 1960 Rome, 1968 Mexico City

European Championship:

- 1962 Leipzig

Universiade:

- 1963 Porto Alegre, 1965 Budapest; 1959 Turin; 1961 Sofia

120 present in the national team of Hungary

=== Club ===
Bp. Kinizsi / Ferencváros - As player of FTC ( –1970)

- OB I (4x): 1962, 1963, 1965, 1968
- Magyar Kupa (5x): 1962, 1964, 1965, 1967, 1969

Bp. Spartacus - As player of Spartacus (1970–1977)

=== Individual ===
- Hungarian Water Polo Player of the Year: 1964, 1968

== See also ==
- Hungary men's Olympic water polo team records and statistics
- List of Olympic champions in men's water polo
- List of Olympic medalists in water polo (men)
- List of men's Olympic water polo tournament top goalscorers
