= Újpesti TE (men's water polo) =

Water polo club in Budapest, Hungary

Újpesti Torna Egylet
- Founded: 1891; 135 years ago (parent club in 1885)
- Dissolved: 2011; 15 years ago
- Based in: Budapest, Hungary
- Colors: Purple and white

Újpesti Torna Egylet vízilabda szakosztály (English: Újpesti Torna Egylet waterpolo department) was a Hungarian water polo club from Újpest, Budapest, that is part of Újpesti TE sport society. The club was founded in 1885, while the waterpolo department (together with the swimming department) was created in 1911. During its history, the club have won 26 national championship titles, more than any other teams.

== Naming history ==
- Újpesti Torna Egylet (UTE): ( ... –1949)
- Budapesti Dózsa (Bp. Dózsa): (1950 – 1956)
- Újpesti Dózsa: (1957 – 1989/90)
- Újpesti TE: (1990/91 – 1992/93)
- UTE-Primavera: (1993/94) - the first naming sponsor
- UTE-Office & Home: (1994/95 – 1997/98)
- UTE-Taxi2000: (1998/99)
- UTE-Santal-Taxi2000: (1999/00)
- UTE-Humet: (2000/01 – 2001/02)
- UTE-Taxi2000: (2002/03 – 2003/04)
- UTE-VB Leasing: (2004/05 – 2005/06)
- UTE-Óbuda-Újlak: (2006/07)
- Uniqa-UTE: (2007/08 – 2009/10)
- Újpesti TE: (2010/11)

== Honours ==
=== Domestic competitions ===
- Országos Bajnokság I (National Championship of Hungary)

Champions (26) – record: 1930, 1931, 1932, 1933, 1934, 1935, 1936, 1937, 1938, 1939, 1941, 1942, 1945, 1946, 1948, 1950, 1951, 1952, 1955, 1960, 1967, 1985–86, 1990–91, 1992–93, 1993–94, 1994–95
Runners-up (16): 1929, 1940, 1944, 1947, 1953, 1954, 1956, 1958, 1959, 1965, 1971, 1972, 1973, 1976, 1978, 1988–89
Third place (7): 1928, 1949, 1961, 1963, 1966, 1991–92, 1995–96

- Magyar Kupa (National Cup of Hungary)

Winners (17) – record: 1929, 1931, 1932, 1933, 1934, 1935, 1936, 1938, 1939, 1944, 1948, 1951, 1952, 1955, 1960, 1963, 1975, 1990–91, 1992–93
Finalist (15): 1947, 1962, 1969, 1974, 1976, 1989–90, 1991–92, 1993–94, 1995–96

=== European competitions ===
- LEN Champions League (Champions Cup)

Winners (1): 1993–94

- LEN Euro Cup

Winners (3): 1992–93, 1996–97, 1998–99

- LEN Super Cup

Winners (1): 1994

== Recent seasons ==
As of 17 August 2022.

=== In European competition ===
- Participations in Champions League (European Cup, Euroleague): x
- Participations in Euro Cup: x
- Participations in Cup Winners' Cup: x

Season	Competition	Round	Club	Home	Away	Aggregate
1986-87	European Cup	Quarter-final round	(Socialist Federal Republic of Yugoslavia) Primorac Kotor	5-7		2nd place
1986-87	European Cup	Quarter-final round	(Czechoslovakia) Košice	8-5		2nd place
1986-87	European Cup	Quarter-final round	(Romania) Crișul Oradea	6-3		2nd place
1986-87	European Cup	Semi-finals	(Soviet Union) Dynamo Moscow	7-10	8-13	15–23
1992-93	LEN Cup; Champion	Finals	(Italy) Pro Recco	12-7	16-13	28–20
1993-94	European Cup; Champion	Quarter-finals	(Croatia) HAVK Mladost	6-6	14-12	20–18
1993-94	European Cup; Champion	Semi-final	(Italy) Posillipo	13-9	11-11	24–20
1993-94	European Cup; Champion	Final	(Spain) Catalunya	10-6	11-11	21–17
1994-95	European Cup; Finalist	Quarter-finals	(Greece) Ethnikos	13-5	12-8	25–13
1994-95	European Cup; Finalist	Semi-final	(Germany) Spandau 04	8-4	9-5	17–9
1994-95	European Cup; Finalist	Final	(Spain) Catalunya	7-8	6-7	13–15
1995-96	European Cup; Finalist	Quarter-finals	(Russia) Dynamo Moscow	16-10	7-9	23–19
1995-96	European Cup; Finalist	Semi-final	(Italy) Posillipo	11-7	11-11	22–18
1995-96	European Cup; Finalist	Final	(Croatia) HAVK Mladost	4-7	6-6	10–13
1996-97	LEN Cup; Champion	Finals	(Hungary) Ferencváros	10-8	12-11 (aet)	22–19
1998-99	LEN Cup; Champion	Finals	(Greece) Patras	12-7	9-10	21–17

== Notable former players ==
- Olivér Halassy ( 1932 Los Angeles, 1936 Berlin )
- János Németh ( 1932 Los Angeles, 1936 Berlin )
- Mihály Bozsi ( 1936 Berlin )
- István Barta ( 1932 Los Angeles )
- Károly Szittya ( 1952 Helsinki )
- György Kutasi ( 1936 Berlin )
- Alajos Keserű ( 1932 Los Angeles )
- Miklós Sárkány ( 1932 Los Angeles, 1936 Berlin )
- Dezső Lemhényi ( 1952 Helsinki )
- Dezső Fábián ( 1952 Helsinki )
- Mihály Mayer ( 1956 Melbourne, 1964 Tokyo )
- Dezső Gyarmati ( 1952 Helsinki, 1956 Melbourne, 1964 Tokyo )
- György Vízvári ( 1952 Helsinki )
- Miklós Martin ( 1952 Helsinki )
- Zoltán Dömötör ( 1964 Tokyo )
- Ottó Boros ( 1956 Melbourne, 1964 Tokyo )
- László Sárosi ( 1976 Montreal )
- Gábor Csapó ( 1976 Montreal )
- Tibor Cservenyák ( 1976 Montreal )
- Tibor Benedek ( 2000 Sydney, 2004 Athens, 2008 Beijing )
- Tamás Kásás ( 2000 Sydney, 2004 Athens, 2008 Beijing )
- Péter Biros ( 2000 Sydney, 2004 Athens, 2008 Beijing )
- Gergely Kiss ( 2000 Sydney, 2004 Athens, 2008 Beijing )
- Tamás Molnár ( 2000 Sydney, 2004 Athens, 2008 Beijing )
- Dániel Varga ( 2008 Beijing )
- Dénes Varga ( 2008 Beijing )
- Bulcsú Székely ( 2000 Sydney )
- Tamás Varga ( 2004 Athens, 2008 Beijing )

- Tamás Dala
- Kálmán Kislégi
- Balázs Vincze
- Nikolaos Kotsidis

== See also ==
- UVSE
