= 2000–01 Országos Bajnokság I (men's water polo) =

Water polo league season

OB I
- Season: 2000–01
- Champions: Honvéd

2000–01 Országos Bajnokság I (men's water polo) was the 95th water polo championship in Hungary.

== First stage ==
#	Team	M	W	D	L	G+	G−	P	Comments
1.	Bp. Honvéd-Domino	11	10	0	1	126	66	20	
2.	BVSC-Brendon	11	9	1	1	119	72	19	
3.	Vasas SC-Plaket	11	9	0	2	137	81	18	
4.	Ferencvárosi TC-Mirato	11	6	2	3	122	92	14	
5.	Újpesti TE-Humet	11	4	4	3	82	74	12	
6.	Tabán Trafik-Szegedi VE	11	5	2	4	84	81	12	
7.	UPC-Egri VK	11	4	3	4	84	91	11	
8.	Csanádi Árpád KSI	11	2	3	6	67	109	7	
9.	Kontavill-Szentesi VK	11	3	1	7	63	87	7	
10.	OSC-British Knights	11	3	0	8	80	119	6	
11.	Szolnoki VSC	11	1	1	9	68	114	3	
12.	MAFC-P&P	11	0	3	8	61	107	1	deducted 2 points

Championship Round
Relegation Round

Pld - Played; W - Won; L - Lost; PF - Points for; PA - Points against; Diff - Difference; Pts - Points.

== Second stage ==
=== Championship Round ===
#	Team	M	W	D	L	G+	G−	P
1.	Bp. Honvéd-Domino	21	16	2	3	207	137	34
2.	BVSC-Brendon	21	15	3	3	200	139	33
3.	Vasas SC-Plaket	21	14	2	5	218	152	30
4.	Ferencvárosi TC-Mirato	21	9	4	8	197	166	22
5.	Újpesti TE-Humet	21	5	9	7	130	131	19
6.	Tabán Trafik-Szegedi VE	21	7	3	11	147	170	12

Championship Round

Pld - Played; W - Won; L - Lost; PF - Points for; PA - Points against; Diff - Difference; Pts - Points.

=== Relegation Round ===
#	Team	M	W	D	L	G+	G−	P	Comments
7.	UPC-Egri VK	21	11	4	6	177	161	26	
8.	Kontavill-Szentesi VK	21	12	1	8	176	167	25	
9.	Csanádi Árpád KSI	21	6	6	9	154	203	18	
10.	OSC-British Knights	21	7	1	13	170	215	15	
11.	Szolnoki VSC	21	4	2	15	154	199	10	
12.	MAFC-P&P	21	0	3	18	130	220	1	deducted 2 points

Relegation

Pld - Played; W - Won; L - Lost; PF - Points for; PA - Points against; Diff - Difference; Pts - Points.

== Championship Playoff ==
Semifinals								Final
1	Bp. Honvéd-Domino	12	11	8	8	11
4	Ferencvárosi TC-Mirato	5	10	9	9	8		1	Bp. Honvéd-Domino	10	11	12	12	-	-
2	BVSC-Brendon	6	5	12	6	14	10	2	BVSC-Brendon	12	9	8	11	-	-
3	Vasas SC-Plaket	5	13	11	7	8	9

== Final standing ==
Qualified for the 2001–02 LEN Champions League
Qualified for the 2001–02 LEN Cup Winners' Cup
Qualified for the 2001–02 LEN Cup
Relegation to the 2001–02 OB I/B

Rank	Team
1st place, gold medalist(s)	Honvéd-Domino
2nd place, silver medalist(s)	BVSC-Brendon
3rd place, bronze medalist(s)	Vasas-Plaket
4	FTC-Mirato
5	Újpesti TE-Humet
6	Tabán Trafik-Szegedi VE
7	UPC-Egri VK
8	Kontavill-Szentesi VK
9	Csanádi Árpád KSI
10	OSC-British Knights
11	Szolnoki VSC
12	MAFC-P&P

2000–01 OB I Champions

Honvéd-Domino
1st Title

Attila Bárány, Miklós Bereczki, Gábor Gombos, Gábor Jäger, Olivér Kovács
Dániel Ofner, Balázs Pelle, Imre Péter, Sándor Sugár, Márton Szívós
Attila Takács, Zoltán Tory, Imre Tóth, Zsolt Varga
Head coach
István Kovács

== Sources ==
- Magyar sportévkönyv 2002
