= 1989–90 Országos Bajnokság I (men's water polo) =

Water polo league season

OB I
- Season: 1989–90
- Champions: Ferencváros

1989–90 Országos Bajnokság I (men's water polo) was the 84th water polo championship in Hungary.

== First stage ==
#	Team	M	W	D	L	G+	G−	P
1.	Ferencvárosi TC-Törley	22	16	3	3	261	190	35
2.	Vasas SC	22	12	6	4	223	200	30
3.	Szeged SC	22	11	6	5	168	168	28
4.	Tungsram SC	22	12	3	7	216	200	27
5.	Újpesti Dózsa	22	9	7	6	214	187	25
6.	Szentesi Vízmű	22	9	5	8	231	243	23
7.	Szolnoki Vízügy	22	8	4	10	189	206	20
8.	Bp. Spartacus	22	6	6	10	228	224	18
9.	Eger SE	22	7	4	11	205	206	18
10.	BVSC	22	7	2	13	176	205	16
11.	OSC	22	5	4	13	190	209	14
12.	Tatabányai Bányász	22	2	6	14	163	216	10

Championship Playoff

Pld - Played; W - Won; L - Lost; PF - Points for; PA - Points against; Diff - Difference; Pts - Points.

== Championship Playoff ==
Semifinals
1	Ferencvárosi TC-Törley	9	14	23
4	Tungsram SC	7	10	17
2	Vasas SC	9	10	19
3	Szeged SC	5	7	12

Final
1	Ferencvárosi TC-Törley	10	10	20
2	Vasas SC	8	8	16

== Final standing ==
Qualified for the 1990–91 LEN Champions League
Qualified for the 1990–91 LEN Cup Winners' Cup

Rank	Team
1st place, gold medalist(s)	Ferencvárosi TC-Törley
2nd place, silver medalist(s)	Vasas SC
3rd place, bronze medalist(s)	Szeged SC
4	Tungsram SC
5	Újpesti Dózsa
6	Szentesi Vízmű
7	Szolnoki Vízügy
8	Bp. Spartacus
9	Eger SE
10	BVSC
11	OSC
12	Tatabányai Bányász

1989–90 OB I Champions
Ferencvárosi TC-Törley
20th Title

1 Tamás Ambrus, 2 Molnár, 3 Zoltán Rázga, 4 Róbert Loványi
5 András Gyöngyösi, 6 Zoltán Fazekas, 7 Lajos Vad, 8 Gusztáv Varga
9 Attila Attila, 10 Attila Attila, 11 István Dóczi
12 Zsolt Csizmadia, 13 Ferenc Szakonyi
Head coach
Dr. István Szívós

== Sources ==
- Gyarmati Dezső: Aranykor (Hérodotosz Könyvkiadó és Értékesítő Bt., Budapest, 2002.)
