= 1999–2000 Országos Bajnokság I (men's water polo) =

Water polo league season

OB I
- Season: 1999–2000
- Champions: Ferencváros

1999–2000 Országos Bajnokság I (men's water polo) was the 94th water polo championship in Hungary.

== First stage ==
#	Team	M	W	D	L	G+	G−	P	Comments
1.	BVSC-Brendon	18	16	1	1	201	110	33	
2.	Ferencvárosi TC-Thomas Jeans	18	15	1	2	173	104	31	
3.	Bp. Honvéd-Domino	18	13	0	5	196	132	26	
4.	Vasas SC-Plaket	18	12	2	4	177	137	26	
5.	Újpesti TE-Santal-Taxi2000	18	8	4	6	155	135	20	
6.	Kontavill-Szentesi VK	18	6	1	11	126	167	13	
7.	ÚVMK BauSystem-Eger	18	5	3	10	128	149	13	
8.	Csanádi Árpád KSI	18	3	1	14	116	181	7	
9.	Szolnoki VSC	18	3	1	14	120	200	7	
10.	BEAC	18	1	2	15	111	188	2	deducted 2 points

Championship Playoff

Pld - Played; W - Won; L - Lost; PF - Points for; PA - Points against; Diff - Difference; Pts - Points.

== Championship Playoff ==
Semifinals
1	BVSC-Brendon	11	4	9
4	Vasas SC-Plaket	7	9	6
2	Ferencvárosi TC-Thomas Jeans	9	10	9	8	6
3	Bp. Honvéd-Domino	12	11	8	7	3

Final
1	BVSC-Brendon	11	5	8	10
2	Ferencvárosi TC-Thomas Jeans	4	6	9	11

== Final standing ==
Qualified for the 2000–01 LEN Champions League
Qualified for the 2000–01 LEN Cup Winners' Cup
Qualified for the 2000–01 LEN Cup
Relegation to the 2000–01 OB I/B

Rank	Team
1st place, gold medalist(s)	Ferencvárosi TC-Thomas Jeans
2nd place, silver medalist(s)	BVSC-Brendon
3rd place, bronze medalist(s)	Domino-Bp. Honvéd
3rd place, bronze medalist(s)	Vasas SC-Plaket
5	Újpesti TE-Santal-Taxi2000
6	Kontavill-Szentesi VK
7	ÚVMK BauSystem-Eger
8	Csanádi Árpád KSI
9	Szolnoki VSC
10	BEAC

1999–00 OB I Champions
Ferencvárosi TC-Thomas Jeans
21st Title

Zoltán Kósz, Bulcsú Székely, Attila Takács, Márk Matajsz,
Csaba Kiss, Máté Hesz, Péter Tiba, Balázs Nyéki, Zsolt Vogel,
Ádám Steinmetz, Attila Takács, Tamás Haufe, Norbert Hosnyánszky
Head coach
Lajos Vad

== Sources ==
- Gyarmati Dezső: Aranykor (Hérodotosz Könyvkiadó és Értékesítő Bt., Budapest, 2002.)
