= 1987–88 Országos Bajnokság I (men's water polo) =

Water polo league season

OB I
- Season: 1987–88
- Champions: Ferencváros

1987–88 Országos Bajnokság I (men's water polo) was the 82nd water polo championship in Hungary.

== First stage ==
| # | Team | M | W | D | L | G+ | G− | P |
|---|---|---|---|---|---|---|---|---|
| 1. | Ferencvárosi TC | 26 | 18 | 3 | 5 | 286 | 236 | 39 |
| 2. | Szolnoki Vízügy | 26 | 16 | 6 | 4 | 285 | 225 | 38 |
| 3. | Tungsram SC | 26 | 15 | 4 | 7 | 271 | 231 | 34 |
| 4. | Újpesti Dózsa | 26 | 16 | 2 | 8 | 250 | 195 | 34 |
| 5. | Vasas SC | 26 | 14 | 5 | 7 | 293 | 252 | 33 |
| 6. | Szeged SC | 26 | 15 | 3 | 8 | 255 | 240 | 33 |
| 7. | Bp. Spartacus | 26 | 14 | 1 | 11 | 256 | 250 | 29 |
| 8. | Szentesi Vízmű | 26 | 13 | 2 | 11 | 284 | 279 | 28 |
| 9. | BVSC | 26 | 12 | 2 | 12 | 257 | 262 | 26 |
| 10. | Tatabányai Bányász | 26 | 10 | 3 | 13 | 266 | 248 | 23 |
| 11. | Eger SE | 26 | 7 | 4 | 15 | 232 | 253 | 18 |
| 12. | Bp. Honvéd | 26 | 7 | 3 | 16 | 228 | 240 | 17 |
| 13. | OSC | 26 | 6 | 0 | 20 | 220 | 286 | 12 |
| 14. | Kecskeméti VSC | 26 | 0 | 0 | 26 | 184 | 370 | 0 |

| Championship Playoff |

Pld - Played; W - Won; L - Lost; PF - Points for; PA - Points against; Diff - Difference; Pts - Points.

== Championship Playoff ==
Semifinals
1 | Ferencvárosi TC | 9 | 9 | 18
4 | Újpesti Dózsa | 8 | 9 | 17
2 | Szolnoki Vízügy | 7 | 11 | 18
3 | Tungsram SC | 8 | 11 | 19

Final
1 | Ferencvárosi TC | 8 | 12 | 20
3 | Tungsram SC | 8 | 6 | 14

=== Third place ===
| Team 1 | Agg. | Team 2 | 1st leg | 2nd leg |
|---|---|---|---|---|
| Újpesti Dózsa | 15–16 | Szolnoki Vízügy | 10–9 | 5–7 |

OB I 1987–88
Champions

Ferencváros
19th Title

== Sources ==
- Gyarmati Dezső: Aranykor (Hérodotosz Könyvkiadó és Értékesítő Bt., Budapest, 2002.)
