= 1957 Országos Bajnokság I (men's water polo) =

Water polo league season

OB I
- Season: 1957
- Champions: Szolnok

1957 Országos Bajnokság I (men's water polo) was the 51st water polo championship in Hungary. There were ten teams who played one-round match for the title.

== Final list ==
#	Team	M	W	D	L	G+	G−	Diff	Pts	Notes
1st place, gold medalist(s)	Szolnoki Dózsa	9	9	0	0	41	16	+25	18	Champion
2nd place, silver medalist(s)	Bp. Vörös Meteor	9	7	0	2	30	14	+16	14	
3rd place, bronze medalist(s)	Ferencvárosi TC	9	7	0	2	29	20	+9	14	
4	Bp. Honvéd	9	4	2	3	39	33	+6	10	
5	BVSC	9	5	0	4	39	34	+5	10	
6	Vasas SC	9	4	1	4	25	25	0	8	deducted 1 point
7	Újpesti Dózsa	9	2	1	6	38	38	0	5	
8.	Bp. Spartacus	9	1	2	6	23	37	−14	4	
9.	MTK	9	1	1	7	17	33	−16	3	
10.	Eger SE	9	1	1	7	24	55	−31	3	Relegated to Országos Bajnokság II

*M - Matches; W - Win; D - Drawn; L - Lost G+ - Goals earned; G− - Goals got; Diff - Difference; P - Point

1957 OB I Champions

Szolnoki Dózsa
2nd Title

Dr. Ottó Boros, István Brinza, Dr. Ferenc Hasznos, György Hegmann, Tivadar Kanizsa, József Kelemen, István Koncz, Ferenc Kuczora, István Pintér
Head coach: István Goór

== 2. Class ==
1. Újpesti Tungsram SE 29, 2. BVTSE 27, 3. Tatabányai Bányász 21(1), 4. Szolnoki Honvéd 21, 5. Szentes 17, 6. Csepel Autó 15, 7. Kistext 14, 8. Bp. Gyárépítők 13, 9. Tipográfia 12, 10. Óbudai Hajógyár 9(1) point. In parentheses were the conclusion penalty points.

== Sources ==
- Gyarmati Dezső: Aranykor (Hérodotosz Könyvkiadó és Értékesítő Bt., Budapest, 2002.)
