= 1984 Országos Bajnokság I (men's water polo) =

Water polo league season

OB I
- Season: 1984
- Champions: Vasas (12th title)
- Relegated: Hódmezővásárhelyi VSE

1984 Országos Bajnokság I (men's water polo) was the 78th water polo championship in Hungary.

== First stage ==
=== Group I ===
#	Team	M	W	D	L	G+	G−	P
1.	Vasas SC	12	11	1	0	167	107	23
2.	Bp. Spartacus	12	6	1	5	116	122	13
3.	Eger SE	12	4	4	4	107	112	12
4.	Tungsram SC	12	5	1	6	109	125	11
5.	Szentesi Vízmű	12	3	4	5	112	114	10
6.	Bp. Honvéd	12	3	2	7	108	122	8
7.	Medicor-OSC	12	3	1	8	102	119	7

=== Group II ===
#	Team	M	W	D	L	G+	G−	P
1.	BVSC	12	11	0	1	149	94	22
2.	Ferencvárosi TC	12	9	0	3	123	106	18
3.	Szolnoki Vízügy	12	6	1	5	118	102	13
4.	Újpesti Dózsa	12	5	2	5	110	102	11
5.	Tatabányai Bányász	12	6	0	6	124	122	12
6.	Szegedi EOL AK	12	2	1	9	115	131	5
7.	Hódmezővásárhelyi VSE	12	1	0	11	98	181	2

Championship Playoff
Relegation Playoff

Pld - Played; W - Won; L - Lost; PF - Points for; PA - Points against; Diff - Difference; Pts - Points.

== Final round ==
=== Semifinals ===
Team 1	Agg.	Team 2	1st leg	2nd leg
Vasas SC	22–20	Ferencvárosi TC	9–10	13–10
BVSC	28–14	Bp. Spartacus	13–4	15–10

==== Final ====
Team 1	Agg.	Team 2	1st leg	2nd leg
Vasas SC	20–14	BVSC	12–9	8–5

OB I 1984
Champions

Vasas
12th Title

==== 3rd Place ====
Team 1	Agg.	Team 2	1st leg	2nd leg
Ferencvárosi TC	28–19	Bp. Spartacus	17–13	9–6

=== 5th Place ===
Team 1	Agg.	Team 2	1st leg	2nd leg
Szolnoki Vízügy	20–16	Eger SE	11–8	9–8

=== 7th Place ===
Team 1	Agg.	Team 2	1st leg	2nd leg
Tungsram SC	22–18	Újpesti Dózsa	13–6	9–9

=== 9th Place ===
Team 1	Agg.	Team 2	1st leg	2nd leg
Tatabányai Bányász	25–22	Szentesi Vízmű	11–14	14–8

=== 11.-14. Place ===
Team 1	Agg.	Team 2	1st leg	2nd leg
Medicor-OSC	18–15	Szegedi EOL AK	9–8	7–7
Honvéd	30–20	Hódmezővásárhelyi VSE	15–10	15–7

==== 11th Place ====
Team 1	Agg.	Team 2	1st leg	2nd leg
Honvéd	22–22 (p)	Medicor-OSC	9–13	13–9

==== 13th Place ====
Team 1	Agg.	Team 2	1st leg	2nd leg
Szegedi EOL AK	35–24	Hódmezővásárhelyi VSE	21–10	14–14

== Sources ==
- Gyarmati Dezső: Aranykor (Hérodotosz Könyvkiadó és Értékesítő Bt., Budapest, 2002.)
