= 1998–99 Országos Bajnokság I (men's water polo) =

Water polo league season

OB I
- Season: 1998–99
- Champions: BVSC

1998–99 Országos Bajnokság I (men's water polo) was the 93rd water polo championship in Hungary.

== First stage ==
#	Team	M	W	D	L	G+	G−	P
1.	Ferencvárosi TC-Vitalin	22	18	3	1	227	116	39
2.	BVSC-Brendon	22	18	1	3	264	148	37
3.	Honvéd-Spartacus VE	22	16	3	3	213	144	35
4.	Vasas SC-Plaket	22	15	3	4	188	142	33
5.	Újpesti TE-Taxi2000	22	15	3	4	233	122	33
6.	ÚVMK Eger-Egervin	22	9	2	11	176	193	20
7.	Kontavill-Szentesi VK	22	7	4	11	147	185	18
8.	Szolnoki VSC	22	7	2	13	168	198	16
9.	ELTE-BEAC-Intruder	22	6	2	14	129	214	14
10.	Tabán Trafik-Szegedi VE	22	4	2	16	131	181	10
11.	OSC	22	2	1	19	105	231	5
12.	MAFC-P&P	22	1	2	19	120	227	4

Championship Playoff
Relegation Playoff
Relegation

Pld - Played; W - Won; L - Lost; PF - Points for; PA - Points against; Diff - Difference; Pts - Points.

== Championship Playoff ==
Semifinals
1	Ferencvárosi TC-Vitalin	8	8	7	10
4	Vasas SC-Plaket	4	7	8	6
2	BVSC-Brendon	11	11
3	Honvéd-Spartacus VE	6	10

Final
1	Ferencvárosi TC-Vitalin	8	6	7	8
2	BVSC-Brendon	7	7	8	10

== Final standing ==
Qualified for the 1999–00 LEN Champions League
Qualified for the 1999–00 LEN Cup Winners' Cup
Qualified for the 1999–00 LEN Cup
relegation play-off
Relegation to the 1999–00 OB I/B

Rank	Team
1st place, gold medalist(s)	BVSC-Brendon
2nd place, silver medalist(s)	Ferencvárosi TC-Vitalin
3rd place, bronze medalist(s)	Honvéd-Spartacus VE
3rd place, bronze medalist(s)	Vasas-Plaket
5	Újpesti TE-Taxi2000
6	ÚVMK Eger-Egervin
7	Kontavill-Szentesi VK
8	Szolnoki VSC
9	ELTE-BEAC-Intruder
10	Tabán Trafik-Szegedi VE
11	OSC
12	MAFC-P&P

1998–99 OB I Champions
BVSC-Brendon
7th Title

Gábor Kis, Tamás Märcz, Zoltán Szécsi
Head coach
György Gerendás

=== Play-off ===
Tabán Trafik-Szegedi VE – OSC 10–6, 3–7, 9–8, 4–6, 10–3

ELTE-BEAC-Intruder – Tabán Trafik-Szegedi VE 10–5, 8–4, 9–8

== Sources ==
- Gyarmati Dezső: Aranykor (Hérodotosz Könyvkiadó és Értékesítő Bt., Budapest, 2002.)
