= 2010–11 Országos Bajnokság I (men's water polo) =

Water polo league season

OB I
- Season: 2010–11
- Champions: Eger
- Champions League: Eger; Vasas; Szeged
- LEN Cup: Honvéd; Szolnok

2010–11 Országos Bajnokság I (men's water polo) was the 105th water polo championship in Hungary.

== First stage ==
#	Team	M	Gy	D	V	G+	G−	P
1.	ZF-Egri VK	24	22	2	0	290	159	68
2.	Szeged-Beton VE	24	20	1	3	299	166	61
3.	TEVA-Vasas-Uniqa	24	20	1	3	295	146	61
4.	Grupama Honvéd	24	19	1	4	306	157	51
5.	Szolnoki Főiskola-Közgép	24	15	1	8	273	177	46
6.	FTC-Fischer Klíma	24	15	0	9	249	194	45
7.	PVSK-Füszért	24	9	1	14	196	222	28
8.	Debrecen Fujitsu	24	7	2	15	173	229	23
9.	BVSC-Zugló	24	7	1	16	219	273	22
10.	Orvosegyetem SC	24	7	1	16	188	266	22
11.	Bodrogi Bau-Szentesi VK	24	6	0	18	175	294	18
12.	Angyalföldi Sportiskola DE	24	2	1	21	160	323	7
13.	Újpesti TE	24	1	0	23	155	372	3

Championship Playoff
European competition Playoff
Relegation Playoff

Pld - Played; W - Won; L - Lost; G+ - Points for; G− - Points against; Diff - Difference; P - Points.

== Championship Playoff ==
#	Team	M	W	D	L	G+	G−	P
1.	ZF-Egri VK	6	5	1	0	50	38	84
2.	TEVA-Vasas-Uniqa	6	2	2	2	48	47	69
3.	Szeged-Beton VE	6	0	3	3	48	57	64
4.	Grupama Honvéd	6	1	2	3	45	49	63

Final
Third place

Pld - Played; W - Won; L - Lost; G+ - Points for; G− - Points against; Diff - Difference; P - Points.

=== Third place ===
Team 1	Agg.	Team 2	1st leg	2nd leg
Grupama Honvéd	9–14	Szeged-Beton VE	6–10	3–4

=== Final ===
Team 1	Agg.	Team 2	1st leg	2nd leg
TEVA-Vasas-Uniqa	14–15	ZF-Egri VK	8–7	6–8

== European competition Playoff ==
#	Team	M	W	D	L	G+	G−	P
5.	Szolnoki Főiskola-Közgép	6	5	1	0	67	31	62
6.	FTC-Fischer Klíma	6	4	0	2	49	46	57
7.	PVSK-Füszért	6	1	0	5	41	59	31
8.	Debrecen Fujitsu	6	1	1	4	30	51	27

Fifth place

Pld - Played; W - Won; L - Lost; G+ - Points for; G− - Points against; Diff - Difference; P - Points.

=== Fifth place ===
Team 1	Agg.	Team 2	1st leg	2nd leg
FTC-Fischer Klíma	14–17	Szolnoki Főiskola-Közgép	7–10	7–7

== Relegation Playoff ==
#	Team	M	W	D	L	G+	G−	P
9.	BVSC-Zugló	8	7	0	1	93	60	21
10.	Orvosegyetem SC	8	4	2	2	98	86	14
11.	Bodrogi Bau-Szentesi VK	8	4	1	3	82	81	13
12.	Angyalföldi Sportiskola DE	8	2	2	4	79	86	8
13.	Újpesti TE	8	0	1	7	71	110	1

Relegation

Pld - Played; W - Won; L - Lost; G+ - Points for; G− - Points against; Diff - Difference; P - Points.

== Final standing ==
Qualified for the 2011–12 LEN Champions League
Qualified for the 2011–12 LEN Euro Cup
Relegation to the 2011–12 OB I/B

Rank	Team
1st place, gold medalist(s)	ZF-Eger
2nd place, silver medalist(s)	TEVA-Vasas-UNIQA
3rd place, bronze medalist(s)	Szeged-Beton VE
4	Grupama Honvéd
5	Szolnoki Főiskola-Közgép
6	FTC-Fisher Klíma
7	PVSK-Fűszért
8	Debrecen-Fujitsu
9	BVSC-Atlantis Casino
10	Orvosegyetem SC
11	Bodrogi Bau-Szentesi VK
12	Angyalföldi Sportiskola DSE
13	Újpesti TE

2010–11 OB I Champions
ZF-Eger
1st Title

1 Zoltán Szécsi, 2 Máté Sántavy, 3 Márton Petrovai, 4 Kevin Graham
5 Norbert Hosnyánszky, 6 Gábor Kovács, 7 Gábor Hegedűs, 8 Zsolt Varga
9 Kotsidis Nikolaos, 10 Szabolcs Binder, 11 Gábor Kis
12 Erik Bundschuch, 13 Péter Biros (c), 14 Olivér Nébald
Head coach
György Gerendás

== Sources ==
- Magyar sportévkönyv 2012
