= 1981 Országos Bajnokság I (men's water polo) =

Water polo league season

OB I
- Season: 1981
- Champions: Vasas

1981 Országos Bajnokság I (men's water polo) was the 75th water polo championship in Hungary. There were fourteen teams who played two-round match for the title.

== Final list ==
#	Team	M	W	D	L	G+	G−	P
1.	Vasas SC	26	22	2	2	311	201	46
2.	BVSC	26	18	6	2	299	221	42
3.	Medicor-OSC	26	15	6	5	238	214	36
4.	Újpesti Dózsa	26	13	7	6	231	208	33
5.	Ferencvárosi TC	26	12	7	7	263	229	31
6.	Vasas Izzó	26	12	7	7	250	234	31
7.	Tatabányai Bányász	26	12	3	11	216	225	27
8.	Eger SE	26	10	4	12	225	249	24
9.	Szolnoki Vízügy	26	10	4	12	238	236	24
10.	Bp. Honvéd	26	7	5	14	230	240	19
11.	Szentesi Vízmű	26	6	4	16	225	262	16
12.	Bp. Spartacus	26	5	5	16	185	239	15
13.	Szegedi EOL AK	26	4	3	19	194	238	11
14.	Hódmezővásárhelyi VSE	26	2	5	19	203	312	9

* M: Matches W: Win D: Drawn L: Lost G+: Goals earned G−: Goals got P: Point

OB I 1981
Champions

Vasas
9th Title

== Sources ==
- Gyarmati Dezső: Aranykor (Hérodotosz Könyvkiadó és Értékesítő Bt., Budapest, 2002.)
