= 1985–86 Országos Bajnokság I (men's water polo) =

Water polo league season

OB I
- Season: 1985-86
- Champions: Újpesti Dózsa
- European Cup: Újpesti Dózsa

1985–86 Országos Bajnokság I (men's water polo) was the 80th water polo championship in Hungary. There were fourteen teams who played two round match for the title.

== Final list ==
| # | Team | M | W | D | L | G+ | G− | P | Notes |
|---|---|---|---|---|---|---|---|---|---|
| 1. | Újpesti Dózsa | 26 | 18 | 7 | 1 | 268 | 190 | 43 | 1986-87 European Cup quarter final |
| 2. | BVSC | 26 | 18 | 4 | 4 | 244 | 185 | 40 | |
| 3. | Vasas SC | 26 | 17 | 4 | 5 | 257 | 186 | 38 | |
| 4. | Szolnoki Vízügy | 26 | 15 | 7 | 4 | 253 | 201 | 37 | |
| 5. | Eger SE | 26 | 16 | 3 | 7 | 215 | 215 | 35 | |
| 6. | Ferencvárosi TC | 26 | 13 | 7 | 6 | 280 | 251 | 33 | |
| 7. | Tungsram SC | 26 | 14 | 3 | 9 | 249 | 237 | 31 | |
| 8. | Tatabányai Bányász | 26 | 10 | 6 | 10 | 210 | 224 | 26 | |
| 9. | Bp. Honvéd | 26 | 7 | 4 | 15 | 223 | 230 | 18 | |
| 10. | Medicor-OSC | 26 | 7 | 2 | 17 | 234 | 275 | 16 | |
| 11. | Bp. Spartacus | 26 | 6 | 4 | 16 | 199 | 237 | 16 | |
| 12. | Szegedi EOL-DÉLÉP SE | 26 | 5 | 6 | 15 | 213 | 239 | 16 | |
| 13. | Szentesi Vízmű | 26 | 4 | 2 | 20 | 219 | 293 | 10 | |
| 14. | Kecskeméti VSC | 26 | 2 | 1 | 21 | 186 | 287 | 5 | |

* M: Matches W: Win D: Drawn L: Lost G+: Goals earned G−: Goals got P: Point

1985-86 OB I
Champions
Újpest
22nd Title

== Sources ==
- Gyarmati Dezső: Aranykor (Hérodotosz Könyvkiadó és Értékesítő Bt., Budapest, 2002.)
- A magyar sport évkönyve 1986
