= 1923 Országos Bajnokság I (men's water polo) =

Water polo league season

OB I
- Season: 1923
- Champions: III. Kerületi TVE

1923 Országos Bajnokság I (men's water polo) was the 17th water polo championship in Hungary. There were six teams who played one round match for the title.

== Final list ==
#	Team	M	W	D	L	G+	G−	P
1.	III. ker. TVE	5	5	0	0	51	8	10
2.	Ferencvárosi TC	5	4	0	1	37	12	8
3.	MAC	5	3	0	2	7	12	6
4.	Vívó és Atlétikai Club	5	2	0	3	9	29	4
5.	MAFC	5	1	0	4	4	32	2
6.	Nemzeti SC	5	0	0	5	1	16	0

* M: Matches W: Win D: Drawn L: Lost G+: Goals earned G−: Goals got P: Point

OB I 1923
Champions

III. Kerületi TVE
1st Title

== Sources ==
- Gyarmati Dezső: Aranykor (Hérodotosz Könyvkiadó és Értékesítő Bt., Budapest, 2002.)
