= 1908 Országos Bajnokság I (men's water polo) =

Water polo league season

OB I
- Season: 1908
- Champions: Magyar ÚE

1908 Országos Bajnokság I (men's water polo) was the fifth waterpolo championship in Hungary. There was only one participant, who thus won the champion without any match.

OB I 1908
Champions

Magyar ÚE
3rd Title

== Sources ==
- Gyarmati Dezső: Aranykor (Hérodotosz Könyvkiadó és Értékesítő Bt., Budapest, 2002.)
