= 1991–92 Országos Bajnokság I (men's water polo) =

Water polo league season

OB I
- Season: 1991–92
- Champions: Tungsram SC

1991–92 Országos Bajnokság I (men's water polo) was the 86th water polo championship in Hungary.

== First stage ==
#	Csapat	M	Gy	D	V	G+	G−	P
1.	Tungsram SC	22	20	2	0	323	240	42
2.	Vasas SC-Plaket	22	15	5	2	324	233	35
3.	Újpesti TE	22	14	1	7	297	232	29
4.	Ferencvárosi TC-Törley	22	12	4	6	300	256	28
5.	Szolnoki Vízügy-RC Cola	22	12	0	10	263	248	24
6.	BVSC	22	10	2	10	262	274	22
7.	Szentesi SC	22	9	2	11	245	244	20
8.	Eger SE	22	8	3	11	264	270	19
9.	Szeged SC	22	8	2	12	246	251	18
10.	OSC-Boniper	22	7	0	15	259	304	14
11.	KSI	22	4	1	17	188	329	9
12.	Bp. Spartacus	22	2	0	20	235	325	4

Championship Playoff

Pld - Played; W - Won; L - Lost; PF - Points for; PA - Points against; Diff - Difference; Pts - Points.

== Championship Playoff ==
Semifinals
1	Tungsram SC	16	16
4	Ferencvárosi TC-Törley	10	13
2	Vasas SC-Plaket	13	16	11
3	Újpesti TE	9	17	10

Final
1	Tungsram SC	15	21
2	Vasas SC-Plaket	12	20

OB I 1991–92
Champions

Tungsram SC
1st Title

== Sources ==
- Gyarmati Dezső: Aranykor (Hérodotosz Könyvkiadó és Értékesítő Bt., Budapest, 2002.)
