= 1943 Országos Bajnokság I (men's water polo) =

37th water polo championship in Hungary

OB I
- Season: 1943
- Champions: Magyar AC

1943 Országos Bajnokság I (men's water polo) was the 37th water polo championship in Hungary. There were eleven teams who played one-round match for the title.

== Final list ==
#	Team	M	W	D	L	G+	G−	P	Comments
1.	MAC	9	8	1	0	42	12	17	
2.	BSE	9	7	1	1	71	9	15	
3.	Ferencvárosi TC	9	7	1	1	52	24	15	
4.	Újpesti TE	9	4	1	4	35	25	9	
5.	Tatabányai SC	9	3	1	5	20	38	7	
6.	MAFC	9	3	1	5	13	33	7	
7.	Weiss Manfréd TK	9	3	0	6	16	35	6	
8.	Marosvásárhelyi SE	9	2	2	5	18	46	6	
9.	MUE	9	2	1	6	11	33	5	
10.	BEAC	9	1	1	7	12	35	3	
11.	Erzsébeti TC	-	-	-	-	-	-	-	deleted

* M: Matches W: Win D: Drawn L: Lost G+: Goals earned G−: Goals got P: Point

OB I 1943
Champions

Magyar AC
2nd Title

== Sources ==
- Gyarmati Dezső: Aranykor (Hérodotosz Könyvkiadó és Értékesítő Bt., Budapest, 2002.)
