= 1974 Országos Bajnokság I (men's water polo) =

Water polo league season

OB I
- Season: 1974
- Champions: Orvosegyetem

1974 Országos Bajnokság I (men's water polo) was the 68th water polo championship in Hungary. There were twelve teams who played two-round match for the title.

== Final list ==
#	Team	M	W	D	L	G+	G−	P
1.	OSC	22	15	5	2	120	79	35
2.	Ferencvárosi TC	22	14	4	4	104	77	32
3.	Vasas SC	22	12	7	3	88	78	31
4.	Egri Dózsa	22	11	6	5	111	99	28
5.	Újpesti Dózsa	22	10	8	4	90	70	28
6.	Bp. Honvéd	22	11	6	5	84	74	28
7.	Szolnoki Vízügy-Dózsa	22	7	6	9	107	102	20
8.	Bp. Spartacus	22	8	3	11	79	86	19
9.	BVSC	22	6	5	11	78	86	17
10.	Vasas Izzó	22	4	6	12	87	110	14
11.	Szegedi EOL SC	22	1	7	14	84	110	9
12.	Szentesi Vízmű	22	0	3	19	85	146	3

* M: Matches W: Win D: Drawn L: Lost G+: Goals earned G−: Goals got P: Point

OB I 1974
Champions

Orvosegyetem
6th Title

== Sources ==
- Gyarmati Dezső: Aranykor (Hérodotosz Könyvkiadó és Értékesítő Bt., Budapest, 2002.)
