= 1907 Országos Bajnokság I (men's water polo) =

Water polo league season

OB I
- Season: 1907
- Champions: Magyar ÚE

1907 Országos Bajnokság I (men's water polo) was the fourth waterpolo championship in Hungary. There was only one participant, who thus won the champion without any match.

At the end of the year Magyar Úszó Egylet was established and from this time this Union was responsible for organising the championships.

OB I 1907
Champions

Magyar ÚE
2nd Title

== Sources ==
- Gyarmati Dezső: Aranykor (Hérodotosz Könyvkiadó és Értékesítő Bt., Budapest, 2002.)
