= 1980 Országos Bajnokság I (men's water polo) =

Water polo league season

OB I
- Season: 1980
- Champions: Vasas

1980 Országos Bajnokság I (men's water polo) was the 74th water polo championship in Hungary. There were fourteen teams who played two-round match for the title.

== Final list ==
#	Team	M	W	D	L	G+	G−	P
1.	Vasas SC	26	21	2	3	206	137	44
2.	Medicor-OSC	26	14	7	5	150	119	35
3.	BVSC	26	16	3	7	162	140	35
4.	Újpesti Dózsa	26	15	5	6	153	128	35
5.	Bp. Honvéd	26	13	5	8	162	141	31
6.	Ferencvárosi TC	26	12	4	10	159	161	28
7.	Szolnoki Vízügy	26	10	7	9	160	144	27
8.	Szentesi Vízmű	26	11	5	10	137	143	27
9.	Szegedi EOL AK	26	10	5	11	127	137	25
10.	Tatabányai Bányász	26	7	9	10	135	147	23
11.	Eger SE	26	7	7	12	139	154	21
12.	Bp. Spartacus	26	7	5	14	132	149	19
13.	Vasas Izzó	26	6	2	18	152	170	14
14.	Volán SC	26	0	0	26	97	201	0

* M: Matches W: Win D: Drawn L: Lost G+: Goals earned G−: Goals got P: Point

OB I 1980
Champions

Vasas
8th Title

== Sources ==
- Gyarmati Dezső: Aranykor (Hérodotosz Könyvkiadó és Értékesítő Bt., Budapest, 2002.)
