= 1936 Országos Bajnokság I (men's water polo) =

Water polo league season

OB I
- Season: 1936
- Champions: Újpest

1936 Országos Bajnokság I (men's water polo) was the 30th water polo championship in Hungary. There were eight teams who played one-round match for the title.

== Final list ==
#	Team	M	W	D	L	G+	G−	P
1.	Újpesti TE	7	6	1	0	38	12	13
2.	MAC	7	6	0	1	28	9	12
3.	III. ker. TVE	7	5	0	2	19	9	10
4.	MTK	7	4	1	2	24	16	9
5.	Szegedi UE	7	2	0	5	17	32	4
6.	Ferencvárosi TC	7	1	1	5	17	34	3
7.	BEAC	7	1	1	5	15	35	3
8.	BSE	7	1	0	6	16	27	2

* M: Matches W: Win D: Drawn L: Lost G+: Goals earned G−: Goals got P: Point

OB I 1936
Champions

Újpest
7th Title

== 2. Class ==
Budapest: 1. MUE 10, 2. NSC 9, 3. VAC 5, 4. MAFC 0 point.

Eastern Division: 1. MOVE Eger SE 10, 2. Orosházi UE 8, 3. Kecskeméti AC 6, 4. Szolnoki MÁV 4, 5. Egri TE 2, 6. Jászapáti Összetartás SE 0 point.

Western Division: 1. Győri ETO, 2. Tatabányai SC.

Final: MUE–Győri ETO 2:0, 0:0.

== Sources ==
- Gyarmati Dezső: Aranykor (Hérodotosz Könyvkiadó és Értékesítő Bt., Budapest, 2002.)
- Magyar Sport Almanach 1936
