= 1946 Országos Bajnokság I (men's water polo) =

Water polo league season

OB I
- Season: 1946
- Champions: Újpest

1946 Országos Bajnokság I (men's water polo) was the 40th water polo championship in Hungary. There were eleven teams who played one-round match for the title.

== Final list ==
#	Team	M	W	D	L	G+	G−	P	Comments
1.	Újpesti TE	9	8	1	0	55	5	17	
2.	MTK	9	8	0	1	56	14	16	
3.	Vasas SC	9	5	3	1	63	15	13	
4.	Ferencvárosi TC	9	5	2	2	59	15	12	
5.	MAFC	9	5	2	2	26	7	12	
6.	Egri Barátság	9	3	0	6	16	43	6	
7.	Nemzeti SC	9	3	0	6	15	38	6	
8.	Csepeli MTK	9	2	1	6	19	45	5	
9.	MMUE	9	1	1	7	17	64	3	
10.	Tipográfia NYTE	9	0	0	9	2	82	0	
11.	Tatabányai SC	-	-	-	-	-	-	-	deleted

* M: Matches W: Win D: Drawn L: Lost G+: Goals earned G−: Goals got P: Point

OB I 1946
Champions

Újpest
14th Title

== Sources ==
- Gyarmati Dezső: Aranykor (Hérodotosz Könyvkiadó és Értékesítő Bt., Budapest, 2002.)
