= 1955 Országos Bajnokság I (men's water polo) =

Water polo league season

OB I
- Season: 1955
- Champions: Újpest

1955 Országos Bajnokság I (men's water polo) was the 49th water polo championship in Hungary. There were ten teams who played two-round match for the title.

== Final list ==
| # | Team | M | W | D | L | G+ | G− | P | Comments |
|---|---|---|---|---|---|---|---|---|---|
| 1. | Bp. Dózsa (Újpest) | 18 | 13 | 4 | 1 | 85 | 40 | 30 | |
| 2. | Bp. Kinizsi (Ferencváros) | 18 | 13 | 3 | 2 | 75 | 38 | 29 | |
| 3. | Bp. Honvéd | 18 | 12 | 4 | 2 | 75 | 30 | 28 | |
| 4. | Szolnoki Dózsa | 18 | 11 | 6 | 1 | 67 | 31 | 28 | |
| 5. | Bp. Vasas | 18 | 9 | 4 | 5 | 80 | 58 | 22 | |
| 6. | Bp. Vörös Lobogó (MTK) | 18 | 5 | 1 | 12 | 35 | 61 | 11 | |
| 7. | Vasas Gheorghiu Dej Hajógyár | 18 | 3 | 3 | 12 | 43 | 67 | 9 | |
| 8. | Bp. Törekvés (BVSC) | 18 | 3 | 3 | 12 | 50 | 70 | 8 | deducted 1 point |
| 9. | Egri Bástya | 18 | 3 | 2 | 13 | 45 | 100 | 8 | |
| 10. | Bp. Vörös Meteor | 18 | 2 | 2 | 14 | 30 | 90 | 6 | |

* M: Matches W: Win D: Drawn L: Lost G+: Goals earned G−: Goals got P: Point

OB I 1955
Champions

Újpest
19th Title

== 2. Class ==
North: 1. Bp. Szikra 24, 2. Tatabányai Bányász 14, 3. Vasas Izzó 13, 4. VL Kistext 12, 5. Csepeli Vasas 9, Esztergomi Dózsa 9, Vasas MÁVAG 2(1) point. In parentheses were the conclusion penalty points.

South: 1. Bp. Spartacus 23, 2. Vasas Csepel Autó 19, 3. Bp. Bástya VTSK 17, 4. VL Hazai Fésűs 10, 5. Szegedi Bástya 8, 6. Szegedi Dózsa 4(1), 7. Törekvés Főposta 1(1) point. In parentheses were the conclusion penalty points.

Final: Bp. Spartacus-Bp. Szikra 7:3 and 2:1

== Sources ==
- Gyarmati Dezső: Aranykor (Hérodotosz Könyvkiadó és Értékesítő Bt., Budapest, 2002.)
