= 1931 Országos Bajnokság I (men's water polo) =

Water polo league season

OB I
- Season: 1931
- Champions: Újpest

1931 Országos Bajnokság I (men's water polo) was the 25th water polo championship in Hungary. There were nine teams who played one round match for the title.

== Final list ==
#	Team	M	W	D	L	G+	G−	P
1.	Újpesti TE	8	8	0	0	61	13	16
2.	III. ker. TVE	8	7	0	1	32	5	14
3.	MAC	8	5	1	2	48	15	11
4.	MOVE Eger SE	8	5	0	3	25	15	10
5.	MTK	8	4	1	3	30	16	9
6.	Szegedi UE	8	2	1	5	19	29	5
7.	Ferencvárosi TC	8	2	1	5	18	34	5
8.	BSZKRT SE	8	1	0	7	6	45	2
9.	Nemzeti SC	8	0	0	8	7	74	0

* M: Matches W: Win D: Drawn L: Lost G+: Goals earned G−: Goals got P: Point

OB I 1931
Champions

Újpest
2nd Title

== See also ==
- History of water polo

== Sources ==
- Gyarmati Dezső: Aranykor (Hérodotosz Könyvkiadó és Értékesítő Bt., Budapest, 2002.)
- Magyar Sport Almanach 1931-1934
