= 1905 Országos Bajnokság I (men's water polo) =

Results of a sports competition

OB I
- Season: 1905
- Champions: Balaton ÚE

1905 Országos Bajnokság I (men's water polo) was the second waterpolo championship in Hungary. There were one round of matches with four teams.

== Final list ==
#	Team	M	W	D	L	G+	G−	P
1.	Balaton ÚE	3	2	1	0	12	7	5
2.	Óbudai TE	3	2	0	1	11	12	4
3.	MÚE	3	1	1	1	23	11	3
4.	Ferencvárosi TC	3	0	0	3	4	20	0

* M: Matches W: Win D: Drawn L: Lost G+: Goals earned G−: Goals got P: Point

OB I 1905
Champions

Balaton ÚE
2nd Title

== Sources ==
- Gyarmati Dezső: Aranykor (Hérodotosz Könyvkiadó és Értékesítő Bt., Budapest, 2002.)
