= 1979 Országos Bajnokság I (men's water polo) =

Water polo league season

OB I
- Season: 1979
- Champions: Vasas

1979 Országos Bajnokság I (men's water polo) was the 73rd water polo championship in Hungary. There were twelve teams who played two-round match for the title.

== Final list ==
| # | Team | M | W | D | L | G+ | G− | P | Comments |
|---|---|---|---|---|---|---|---|---|---|
| 1. | Vasas SC | 22 | 15 | 6 | 1 | 137 | 93 | 36 | |
| 2. | Medicor-OSC | 22 | 16 | 4 | 2 | 122 | 80 | 36 | |
| 3. | Ferencvárosi TC | 22 | 15 | 3 | 4 | 128 | 93 | 33 | |
| 4. | BVSC | 22 | 12 | 4 | 6 | 139 | 122 | 28 | |
| 5. | Újpesti Dózsa | 22 | 8 | 9 | 5 | 109 | 95 | 23 | deducted 2 points |
| 6. | Bp. Honvéd | 22 | 6 | 7 | 9 | 110 | 123 | 19 | |
| 7. | Vasas Izzó | 22 | 6 | 4 | 12 | 128 | 147 | 16 | |
| 8. | Szegedi EOL AK | 22 | 3 | 9 | 10 | 88 | 113 | 15 | |
| 9. | Bp. Spartacus | 22 | 5 | 5 | 12 | 84 | 105 | 15 | |
| 10. | Szentesi Vízmű | 22 | 4 | 6 | 12 | 103 | 128 | 14 | |
| 11. | Szolnoki Vízügy | 22 | 4 | 4 | 14 | 101 | 122 | 12 | |
| 12. | Tatabányai Bányász | 22 | 3 | 5 | 14 | 84 | 112 | 11 | |

* M: Matches W: Win D: Drawn L: Lost G+: Goals earned G−: Goals got P: Point

OB I 1979
Champions

Vasas
7th Title

== Sources ==
- Gyarmati Dezső: Aranykor (Hérodotosz Könyvkiadó és Értékesítő Bt., Budapest, 2002.)
