= 1977 Országos Bajnokság I (men's water polo) =

Water polo league season

OB I
- Season: 1977
- Champions: Vasas

1977 Országos Bajnokság I (men's water polo) was the 71st water polo championship in Hungary. There were twelve teams who played two-round match for the title.

== Final list ==
#	Team	M	W	D	L	G+	G−	P	Comments
1.	Vasas SC	22	18	2	2	130	71	38	
2.	OSC	22	18	0	4	119	69	36	
3.	Ferencvárosi TC	22	17	1	4	126	90	35	
4.	BVSC	22	15	2	5	125	103	32	
5.	Bp. Spartacus	22	10	4	8	126	115	24	
6.	Újpesti Dózsa	22	9	5	8	103	96	23	
7.	Szolnoki Vízügy	22	3	9	10	100	123	15	
8.	Vasas Izzó	22	4	6	12	87	101	14	
9.	Szentesi Vízmű	22	5	4	13	83	112	13	deducted 1 point
10.	Eger SE	22	3	7	12	93	131	13	
11.	Szegedi EOL AK	22	3	5	14	86	125	10	deducted 1 point
12.	Bp. Honvéd	22	3	3	16	78	120	9	

* M: Matches W: Win D: Drawn L: Lost G+: Goals earned G−: Goals got P: Point

OB I 1977
Champions

Vasas
6th Title

== Sources ==
- Gyarmati Dezső: Aranykor (Hérodotosz Könyvkiadó és Értékesítő Bt., Budapest, 2002.)
