= 1945 Országos Bajnokság I (men's water polo) =

Water polo league season

OB I
- Season: 1945
- Champions: Újpest

1945 Országos Bajnokság I (men's water polo) was the 39th water polo championship in Hungary. There were eight teams who played one-round match for the title.

== Final list ==
#	Team	M	W	D	L	G+	G−	P	Comments
1.	Újpesti TE	5	5	0	0	21	10	10	
2.	Vasas SC	5	4	0	1	28	13	8	
3.	Ferencvárosi TC	5	3	0	2	15	8	6	
4.	MMUE	5	2	0	3	16	25	4	
5.	MTK	5	1	0	4	11	22	2	
6.	Csepeli MTK	5	0	0	5	7	20	0	
–	Egri Barátság	-	-	-	-	-	-	-	deleted
–	Tatabányai SC	-	-	-	-	-	-	-	deleted

* M: Matches W: Win D: Drawn L: Lost G+: Goals earned G−: Goals got P: Point

OB I 1945
Champions

Újpest
13th Title

== 2. Class ==
1. NSC 14, 2. Tipográfia 11, 3. KaSE 10, 4. MTE 8, 5. Postás 6 point.

== Sources ==
- Gyarmati Dezső: Aranykor (Hérodotosz Könyvkiadó és Értékesítő Bt., Budapest, 2002.)
