= 1922 Országos Bajnokság I (men's water polo) =

Water polo league season

OB I
- Season: 1922
- Champions: Ferencváros

1922 Országos Bajnokság I (men's water polo) was the 16th water polo championship in Hungary. There were five teams who played one round match for the title.

== Final list ==
#	Csapat	M	W	D	L	G+	G−	P
1.	Ferencvárosi TC	4	4	0	0	21	6	8
2.	III. ker. TVE	4	3	0	1	24	7	6
3.	MAC	4	2	0	2	9	15	4
4.	MAFC	4	1	0	3	4	10	2
5.	Nemzeti SC	4	0	0	4	2	22	0

* M: Matches W: Win D: Drawn L: Lost G+: Goals earned G−: Goals got P: Point

OB I 1922
Champions

Ferencváros
9th Title

== Sources ==
- Gyarmati Dezső: Aranykor (Hérodotosz Könyvkiadó és Értékesítő Bt., Budapest, 2002.)
