= 1941 Országos Bajnokság I (men's water polo) =

Water polo league season

OB I
- Season: 1941
- Champions: Újpest

1941 Országos Bajnokság I (men's water polo) was the 35th water polo championship in Hungary. There were ten teams who played one-round match for the title.

== Final list ==
#	Team	M	W	D	L	G+	G−	P
1.	Újpesti TE	9	7	2	0	55	7	16
2.	MAC	9	7	1	1	36	6	15
3.	Ferencvárosi TC	9	6	3	0	41	12	15
4.	BSE	9	6	2	1	55	8	14
5.	III. ker. TVE	9	4	1	4	13	27	9
6.	Tatabányai SC	9	3	0	6	23	42	6
7.	Nemzeti SC	9	3	0	6	9	42	6
8.	MTK	9	2	0	7	15	43	4
9.	BEAC	9	1	1	7	14	39	3
10.	Szegedi VSE	9	1	0	8	16	51	2

* M: Matches W: Win D: Drawn L: Lost G+: Goals earned G−: Goals got P: Point

OB I 1941
Champions

Újpest
11th Title

== Sources ==
- Gyarmati Dezső: Aranykor (Hérodotosz Könyvkiadó és Értékesítő Bt., Budapest, 2002.)
