= 1906 Országos Bajnokság I (men's water polo) =

Water polo league season

OB I
- Season: 1906
- Champions: Magyar ÚE

1906 Országos Bajnokság I (men's water polo) was the third waterpolo championship in Hungary. There was one match with two teams.

== Final list ==
#	Team	M	W	D	L	G+	G−	P
1.	MÚE	1	1	0	0	3	1	2
2.	Balaton ÚE	1	0	0	1	1	3	0

* M: Matches W: Win D: Drawn L: Lost G+: Goals earned G−: Goals got P: Point

OB I 1906
Champions

Magyar ÚE
1st Title

== Sources ==
- Gyarmati Dezső: Aranykor (Hérodotosz Könyvkiadó és Értékesítő Bt., Budapest, 2002.)
