= 1964 Országos Bajnokság I (men's water polo) =

Water polo league season

OB I
- Season: 1964
- Champions: Szolnok

1964 Országos Bajnokság I (men's water polo) was the 58th water polo championship in Hungary. There were ten teams who played two-round match for the title.

== Final list ==
#	Team	M	W	D	L	G+	G−	P
1.	Szolnoki Dózsa	18	15	2	1	90	56	32
2.	Ferencvárosi TC	18	13	3	2	76	46	29
3.	Egri Dózsa	18	11	2	5	69	61	24
4.	BVSC	18	9	3	6	77	60	21
5.	Bp. Honvéd	18	10	1	7	69	68	21
6.	Csepel Autó	18	5	6	7	51	44	17
7.	Újpesti Dózsa	18	5	6	7	60	52	16
8.	Bp. Spartacus	18	3	4	11	60	75	11
9.	OSC	18	1	6	11	55	78	8
10.	Vasas SC	18	0	1	17	53	120	1

* M: Matches W: Win D: Drawn L: Lost G+: Goals earned G−: Goals got P: Point

OB I 1964
Champions

Szolnok
6th Title

== Sources ==
- Gyarmati Dezső: Aranykor (Hérodotosz Könyvkiadó és Értékesítő Bt., Budapest, 2002.)
