= 1994–95 Országos Bajnokság I (men's water polo) =

Water polo league season

OB I
- Season: 1994–95
- Champions: Újpest

1994–95 Országos Bajnokság I (men's water polo) was the 89th water polo championship in Hungary.

== First stage ==
#	Team	M	W	D	L	G+	G−	P
1.	Vasas SC-Plaket	22	20	1	1	269	133	41
2.	Újpesti TE-Office & Home	22	18	1	3	266	154	37
3.	BVSC-Westel	22	16	2	4	260	184	34
4.	Tungsram SC	22	15	1	6	204	165	31
5.	Ferencvárosi TC-Vitasport	22	12	3	7	244	198	27
6.	Szegedi VE	22	11	4	7	184	166	26
7.	Kontavill-Szentesi SC	22	10	3	9	198	203	23
8.	Bp. Spartacus	22	7	2	13	177	201	16
9.	ÚVMK Eger	22	6	3	13	214	229	15
10.	Szolnoki VSE	22	1	4	17	172	229	6
11.	Csanádi Árpád KSI	22	2	1	19	138	293	5
12.	Alucon-Plettac-Hódmezővásárhelyi VSC	22	1	1	20	145	316	3

Championship Playoff

Pld - Played; W - Won; L - Lost; PF - Points for; PA - Points against; Diff - Difference; Pts - Points.

== Championship Playoff ==
Quarterfinals
3	BVSC-Westel	10	9	7
6	Szegedi VE	6	10	8
4	Tungsram SC	10	9
5	Ferencvárosi TC-Vitasport	11	10

Semifinals
1	Vasas SC-Plaket	6	8
6	Szegedi VE	5	6
2	Újpesti TE-Office & Home	6	9	13
5	Ferencvárosi TC-Vitasport	8	4	8

Final
1	Vasas SC-Plaket	6	5
2	Újpesti TE-Office & Home	9	7

OB I 1994–95
Champions

Újpest
26th Title

== Sources ==
- Gyarmati Dezső: Aranykor (Hérodotosz Könyvkiadó és Értékesítő Bt., Budapest, 2002.)
