= 1924 Országos Bajnokság I (men's water polo) =

Water polo league season

OB I
- Season: 1924
- Champions: III. Kerületi TVE

1924 Országos Bajnokság I (men's water polo) was the 18th water polo championship in Hungary. There were seven teams who played one-round match for the title.

== Final list ==
| # | Team | M | W | D | L | G+ | G− | P |
|---|---|---|---|---|---|---|---|---|
| 1. | III. ker. TVE | 6 | 6 | 0 | 0 | 52 | 5 | 12 |
| 2. | Ferencvárosi TC | 6 | 4 | 1 | 1 | 44 | 6 | 9 |
| 3. | MAC | 6 | 4 | 1 | 1 | 23 | 5 | 9 |
| 4. | Nemzeti SC | 6 | 3 | 0 | 3 | 20 | 26 | 6 |
| 5. | Vívó és Atlétikai Club | 6 | 2 | 0 | 4 | 10 | 39 | 4 |
| 6. | MAFC | 6 | 4 | 0 | 5 | 6 | 40 | 2 |
| 7. | MUE | 6 | 0 | 0 | 6 | 5 | 39 | 0 |

* M: Matches W: Win D: Drawn L: Lost G+: Goals earned G−: Goals got P: Point

OB I 1924
Champions

III. Kerületi TVE
2nd Title

== 2. Class ==
1. UTE 4, 2. MTK 2, 3. BEAC 0 pont.

== Sources ==
- Gyarmati Dezső: Aranykor (Hérodotosz Könyvkiadó és Értékesítő Bt., Budapest, 2002.)
- Sport-évkönyv 1924
- Sporthírlap 1924.09.15.
