= 1960 Országos Bajnokság I (men's water polo) =

Water polo league season

OB I
- Season: 1960
- Champions: Újpest

1960 Országos Bajnokság I (men's water polo) was the 54th water polo championship in Hungary. There were twelve teams who played one-round match for the title.

== Final list ==
#	Team	Pld	W	D	L	G+	G−	Pts	Notes
1.	Újpesti Dózsa	11	9	2	0	58	16	20	Champion
2.	Ferencvárosi TC	11	9	2	0	44	14	20	
3.	Szolnoki Dózsa	11	8	2	1	50	19	18	
4.	Egri Vasas	11	4	3	4	44	44	11	
5.	Bp. Honvéd	11	4	2	5	37	33	10	
6.	Vasas SC	11	4	2	5	44	43	10	
7.	Vasas Izzó	11	3	3	5	28	42	9	
8.	Bp. Vörös Meteor	11	3	3	5	39	59	9	
9.	BVSC	11	2	4	5	43	52	8	
10.	MTK	11	3	1	7	34	50	7	
11.	Bp. Spartacus	11	2	1	8	35	58	5	
12.	Szentesi Kinizsi	11	2	1	8	34	60	5	Relegated to Országos Bajnokság II

* M: Matches W: Win D: Drawn L: Lost G+: Goals earned G−: Goals got P: Point

1960 OB I Champions
Újpesti Dózsa
20th Title

Zoltán Dömötör, Mihály Mayer
Head coach:

== Sources ==
- Gyarmati Dezső: Aranykor (Hérodotosz Könyvkiadó és Értékesítő Bt., Budapest, 2002.)
