= 1952 Országos Bajnokság I (men's water polo) =

Water polo league season

OB I
- Season: 1952
- Champions: Újpest

1952 Országos Bajnokság I (men's water polo) was the 46th water polo championship in Hungary. There were ten teams who played one-round match for the title.

== Final list ==
#	Team	M	W	D	L	G+	G−	P
1.	Bp. Dózsa (Újpest)	9	7	2	0	49	10	16
2.	Bp. Vasas	9	7	0	2	50	20	14
3.	Bp. Bástya (MTK)	9	4	4	1	30	16	12
4.	Bp. Honvéd	9	4	3	2	41	12	11
5.	Bp. Kinizsi (Ferencváros)	9	5	1	3	35	22	11
6.	Szolnoki Dózsa	9	3	4	2	26	13	10
7.	Egri Fáklya	9	4	0	5	28	26	8
8.	Bp. Lokomotív	9	2	2	5	31	58	6
9.	Tatabányai Bányász	9	1	0	8	19	83	2
10.	Bp. Vörös Meteor	9	0	0	9	10	59	0

* M: Matches W: Win D: Drawn L: Lost G+: Goals earned G−: Goals got P: Point

OB I 1952
Champions

Újpest
18th Title

== 2. Class ==
Qualification-Relegation play-offs: 1. Vasas Izzó 11, 2. Szegedi Dózsa 10, 3. Vasas Csepel Autó 9, 4. Miskolci Bástya 6, 5. Győri Vasas 2, 6. Székesfehérvári Dózsa 2, 7. Tolnai Vörös Lobogó 2 point.

Budapest: 1. Vasas Izzó 27, 2. Csepeli Vasas 27, 3. Bp. Előre 20, 4. Vasas MÁVAG 20, 5. Vasas Beloiannisz-gyár 20, 6. III. ker. Vörös Lobogó 15, 7. Előre MÁVAUT 8, 8. Bp. Szikra 7, 9. Bp. Építők 0 point.

== Sources ==
- Gyarmati Dezső: Aranykor (Hérodotosz Könyvkiadó és Értékesítő Bt., Budapest, 2002.)
