= 1918 Országos Bajnokság I (men's water polo) =

Water polo league season

OB I
- Season: 1918
- Champions: Ferencváros

1918 Országos Bajnokság I (men's water polo) was the 12th water polo championship in Hungary. There were two teams who played one match for the title.

== Final list ==
#	Team	M	W	D	L	G+	G−	P
1.	Ferencvárosi TC	1	1	0	0	7	1	2
2.	MAFC	1	0	0	1	1	7	0

* M: Matches W: Win D: Drawn L: Lost G+: Goals earned G−: Goals got P: Point

OB I 1918
Champions

Ferencváros
5th Title

== Sources ==
- Gyarmati Dezső: Aranykor (Hérodotosz Könyvkiadó és Értékesítő Bt., Budapest, 2002.)
