= 1990–91 Országos Bajnokság I (men's water polo) =

Water polo league season

OB I
- Season: 1990–91
- Champions: Újpest

1990–91 Országos Bajnokság I (men's water polo) was the 85th water polo championship in Hungary.

== First stage ==
#	Team	M	W	D	L	G+	G−	P
1.	Újpesti TE	22	22	0	0	324	201	44
2.	Szentesi SC	22	16	1	5	326	261	33
3.	Tungsram SC	22	16	1	5	325	222	33
4.	Ferencvárosi TC-Törley	22	13	4	5	331	271	30
5.	Vasas SC	22	11	3	8	298	279	25
6.	Szeged SC	22	10	1	11	286	262	21
7.	Eger SE	22	8	3	11	263	283	19
8.	BVSC	22	8	3	11	251	270	19
9.	Szolnoki Vízügy	22	7	3	12	272	286	17
10.	OSC-Boniper	22	7	1	14	266	296	15
11.	Bp. Spartacus	22	4	0	18	275	360	8
12.	Tatabányai Bányász	22	0	0	22	227	453	0

Championship Playoff

Pld - Played; W - Won; L - Lost; PF - Points for; PA - Points against; Diff - Difference; Pts - Points.

== Championship Playoff ==
Semifinals
1	Újpesti TE	11	7	10
4	Ferencvárosi TC-Törley	13	5	6
2	Szentesi SC	13	12	12
3	Tungsram SC	12	16	11

Final
1	Újpesti TE	18	14
2	Szentesi SC	13	13

OB I 1990–91
Champions

Újpest
23rd Title

== Sources ==
- Gyarmati Dezső: Aranykor (Hérodotosz Könyvkiadó és Értékesítő Bt., Budapest, 2002.)
