= 1967 Országos Bajnokság I (men's water polo) =

Water polo league season

OB I
- Season: 1967
- Champions: Újpest

1967 Országos Bajnokság I (men's water polo) was the 61st water polo championship in Hungary. There were twelve teams who played two-round match for the title.

== Final list ==
#	Team	M	W	D	L	G+	G−	P
1.	Újpesti Dózsa	18	15	3	0	90	60	33
2.	Bp. Honvéd	18	13	2	3	85	59	28
3.	Ferencvárosi TC	18	12	3	3	86	67	27
4.	OSC	18	9	4	5	97	77	22
5.	Csepel Autó	18	9	2	7	80	73	20
6.	Szolnoki Dózsa	18	6	4	8	85	84	16
7.	Bp. Spartacus	18	5	3	10	60	68	13
8.	Egri Dózsa	18	3	4	11	72	95	10
9.	BVSC	18	2	3	13	65	101	7
10.	Vasas Izzó	18	1	2	15	53	89	4

* M: Matches W: Win D: Drawn L: Lost G+: Goals earned G−: Goals got P: Point

OB I 1967
Champions

Újpest
21st Title

== Sources ==
- Gyarmati Dezső: Aranykor (Hérodotosz Könyvkiadó és Értékesítő Bt., Budapest, 2002.)
