= 1951 Országos Bajnokság I (men's water polo) =

Water polo league season

OB I
- Season: 1951
- Champions: Újpest

1951 Országos Bajnokság I (men's water polo) was the 45th water polo championship in Hungary. There were ten teams who played two-round match for the title.

== Final list ==
#	Csapat	M	Gy	D	V	G+	G−	P
1.	Bp. Dózsa (Újpest)	18	16	2	0	114	33	34
2.	Bp. Vasas	18	16	1	1	101	38	33
3.	Bp. Kinizsi (Ferencváros)	18	10	2	6	92	54	22
4.	Szolnoki Dózsa	18	8	4	6	66	65	20
5.	Egri Fáklya	18	9	0	9	82	61	18
6.	Bp. Honvéd	18	7	3	8	66	50	17
7.	Bp. Bástya (MTK)	18	6	3	9	52	54	15
8.	Bp. Lokomotív	18	6	2	10	62	85	14
9.	Bp. Előre	18	2	2	14	26	126	6
10.	Csepeli Vasas	18	0	1	17	27	122	1

* M: Matches W: Win D: Drawn L: Lost G+: Goals earned G−: Goals got P: Point

OB I 1951
Champions

Újpest
17th Title

== 2. Class ==
Qualification-Relegation play-offs: 1. Bp. Vörös Meteor 9, 2. Tatabányai Bányász 8, 3. Vasas Csepel Autó 6, 4. Szegedi Petőfi 5, 5. Tolnai Vörös Lobogó 2, 6. Miskolci Bástya 0 point.

Budapest: 1. Bp. Vörös Meteor 23, 2. Vasas MÁVAG 13, 3. Előre MÁVAUT 12, 4. Bp. Vörös Lobogó 11 (2), 5. Szikra Tipográfia 8 (2), 6. Bp. Haladás 8 (2), 7. Gyárépítés 1 point (2). In parentheses number of matches is missed.

== Sources ==
- Gyarmati Dezső: Aranykor (Hérodotosz Könyvkiadó és Értékesítő Bt., Budapest, 2002.)
