= 1919 Országos Bajnokság I (men's water polo) =

OB I
- Season: 1918
- Champions: Ferencváros

1919 Országos Bajnokság I (men's water polo) was the 13th water polo championship in Hungary. There were four teams who played one-round match for the title.

== Final list ==
#	Team	M	W	D	L	G+	G−	P
1.	Ferencvárosi TC	3	3	0	0	16	5	6
2.	MAFC	3	2	0	1	7	5	4
3.	III. ker. TVE	3	1	0	2	10	13	2
4.	Nemzeti SC	3	0	0	3	2	12	0

* M: Matches W: Win D: Drawn L: Lost G+: Goals earned G−: Goals got P: Point

OB I 1919
Champions

Ferencváros
6th Title

== Sources ==
- Gyarmati Dezső: Aranykor (Hérodotosz Könyvkiadó és Értékesítő Bt., Budapest, 2002.)
