= 1921 Országos Bajnokság I (men's water polo) =

Water polo league season

OB I
- Season: 1921
- Champions: Ferencváros

1921 Országos Bajnokság I (men's water polo) was the 15th water polo championship in Hungary. There were five teams who played one round match for the title.

== Final list ==
#	Team	M	W	D	L	G+	G−	P
1.	Ferencvárosi TC	4	4	0	0	25	3	8
2.	III. ker. TVE	4	3	0	1	11	7	6
3.	MAC	4	2	0	2	17	7	4
4.	MAFC	4	1	0	3	12	13	2
5.	Nemzeti SC	4	0	0	4	1	36	0

* M: Matches W: Win D: Drawn L: Lost G+: Goals earned G−: Goals got P: Point

OB I 1921
Champions

Ferencváros
8th Title

== Sources ==
- Gyarmati Dezső: Aranykor (Hérodotosz Könyvkiadó és Értékesítő Bt., Budapest, 2002.)
