= 1904 Országos Bajnokság I (men's water polo) =

Water polo league season

OB I
- Season: 1904
- Champions: Balaton ÚE

1904 Országos Bajnokság I (men's water polo) was the first water polo championship hold in Hungary. It was organised by the swimming division of the Hungarian Athletes' Association. There were four participating teams in the championship. There was only one round. All the matches were held in Császárfüddő during the first three weekends of September.

Best team of the previous years, MUE did not take part in the championship, because some swimmers were not satisfied with the leadership in connection with the Olympics held in St. Louis.

== Final list ==
| # | Team | M | W | D | L | G+ | G− | P |
|---|---|---|---|---|---|---|---|---|
| 1. | Balaton ÚE | 3 | 3 | 0 | 0 | 17 | 0 | 6 |
| 2. | Postatakarékpénztár SE | 3 | 2 | 0 | 1 | 11 | 6 | 4 |
| 3. | Budafok-Kistétény SE | 3 | 1 | 0 | 2 | 5 | 14 | 2 |
| 4. | Ferencvárosi TC | 3 | 0 | 0 | 3 | 3 | 16 | 0 |

* M: Matches W: Win D: Drawn L: Lost G+: Goals earned G−: Goals got P: Point

OB I 1904
Champions

Balaton ÚE
1st Title

== Sources ==
- Gyarmati Dezső: Aranykor (Hérodotosz Könyvkiadó és Értékesítő Bt., Budapest, 2002.)
