= 1961 Országos Bajnokság I (men's water polo) =

Water polo league season

OB I
- Season: 1961
- Champions: Szolnok

1961 Országos Bajnokság I (men's water polo) was the 55th water polo championship in Hungary. There were twelve teams who played two-round match for the title.

== Final list ==
#	Team	M	W	D	L	G+	G−	Pts	Notes
1.	Szolnoki Dózsa	22	19	1	2	130	59	39	Champion
2.	Ferencvárosi TC	22	18	3	1	109	54	39	
3.	Újpesti Dózsa	22	16	4	2	119	56	36	
4.	Bp. Honvéd	22	13	4	5	104	62	30	
5.	BVSC	22	11	3	8	94	79	25	
6.	20px Egri Dózsa	22	11	2	9	123	95	24	
7.	Vasas SC	22	8	4	10	103	93	20	
8.	Vasas Izzó	22	9	2	11	93	102	20	
9.	Bp. Spartacus	22	9	1	12	91	114	19	
10.	Csepel Autó	22	2	2	18	52	126	6	Relegated to Országos Bajnokság II
11.	MTK	22	2	1	19	69	142	5	Relegated to Országos Bajnokság II
12.	Bp. Vörös Meteor	22	0	1	21	34	137	1	Relegated to Országos Bajnokság II

* M: Matches W: Win D: Drawn L: Lost G+: Goals earned G−: Goals got P: Point

1961 OB I Champions

Szolnoki Dózsa
5th Title

== Sources ==
- Gyarmati Dezső: Aranykor (Hérodotosz Könyvkiadó és Értékesítő Bt., Budapest, 2002.)
