= 1917 Országos Bajnokság I (men's water polo) =

Water polo league season

OB I
- Season: 1917
- Champions: Műegyetemi AFC

1917 Országos Bajnokság I (men's water polo) was the 11th water polo championship in Hungary. There were two teams who played one match for the title.

== Final list ==
#	Team	M	W	D	L	G+	G−	P
1.	MAFC	1	1	0	0	12	1	2
2.	MTK	1	0	0	1	1	12	0

* M: Matches W: Win D: Drawn L: Lost G+: Goals earned G−: Goals got P: Point

OB I 1917
Champions

Műegyetemi AFC
1st Title

== Sources ==
- Gyarmati Dezső: Aranykor (Hérodotosz Könyvkiadó és Értékesítő Bt., Budapest, 2002.)
