= 1925 Országos Bajnokság I (men's water polo) =

Water polo league season

OB I
- Season: 1925
- Champions: Ferencváros

1925 Országos Bajnokság I (men's water polo) was the 19th water polo championship in Hungary. There were seven teams who played one round match for the title.

== Final list ==
#	Team	M	W	D	L	G+	G−	P
1.	Ferencvárosi TC	6	6	0	0	54	7	12
2.	III. ker. TVE	6	5	0	1	24	8	10
3.	Nemzeti SC	6	3	1	2	30	21	7
4.	MAC	6	2	2	2	15	15	6
5.	Vívó és Atlétikai Club	6	2	0	4	14	36	4
6.	Újpesti TE	6	1	1	4	10	28	3
7.	MAFC	6	0	0	6	3	35	0

* M: Matches W: Win D: Drawn L: Lost G+: Goals earned G−: Goals got P: Point

OB I 1925
Champions

Ferencváros
10th Title

== 2. Class ==
1. MTK 4, 2. MUE 2, 3. MTE 0 pont.

== Sources ==
- Gyarmati Dezső: Aranykor (Hérodotosz Könyvkiadó és Értékesítő Bt., Budapest, 2002.)
- Sport-évkönyv 1925
