= 1959 Országos Bajnokság I (men's water polo) =

Water polo league season

OB I
- Season: 1959
- Champions: Szolnok

1959 Országos Bajnokság I (men's water polo) was the 53rd water polo championship in Hungary. There were ten teams who played two-round match for the title.

== Final list ==
#	Team	M	W	D	L	G+	G−	Diff	Pts	Notes
1st place, gold medalist(s)	Szolnoki Dózsa	18	15	2	1	84	39	+45	32	Champion
2nd place, silver medalist(s)	Újpesti Dózsa	18	15	2	1	79	43	+36	32	
3rd place, bronze medalist(s)	Bp. Honvéd	18	11	3	4	66	48	+18	25	
4	BVSC	18	9	3	6	87	74	+13	21	
5	Ferencvárosi TC	18	4	9	5	53	60	−7	17	
6	Újpesti Tungsram TE	18	5	4	9	58	77	−19	14	
7	Vasas SC	18	4	5	9	77	82	−5	13	
8	Bp. Spartacus	18	3	6	9	56	69	−13	12	
9	Egri SC	18	3	3	12	78	100	−22	9	
10	Bp. Vörös Meteor	18	1	3	14	42	88	−46	5	Relegated to Országos Bajnokság II

* M: Matches W: Win D: Drawn L: Lost G+: Goals earned G−: Goals got P: Point

1959 OB I Champions

Szolnoki Dózsa
4th Title

Dr. Ottó Boros, István Brinza, György Hegmann, Tivadar Kanizsa, József Kelemen, István Koncz, Ferenc Kuczora, István Pintér, Kázmér Szegedi Varga
Head coach: István Goór

== 2. Class ==
1. Szentes 26, 2. MTK 25, 3. Csepel Autó 23, 4. Tatabánya 20, 5. Budai Spartacus 16, 6. Bp. VTSK 11, 7. Bp. Építők 9, 8. Hódmezővásárhelyi MTE 8, 9. Szolnoki Honvéd 6 point. SZEAC were deleted.

== Sources ==
- Gyarmati Dezső: Aranykor (Hérodotosz Könyvkiadó és Értékesítő Bt., Budapest, 2002.)
