= 1926 Országos Bajnokság I (men's water polo) =

Water polo league season

OB I
- Season: 1926
- Champions: Ferencváros

1926 Országos Bajnokság I (men's water polo) was the 20th water polo championship in Hungary. There were six teams who played one round match for the title.

== Final list ==
#	Team	M	W	D	L	G+	G−	P
1.	Ferencvárosi TC	5	5	0	0	34	3	10
2.	III. ker. TVE	5	4	0	1	22	10	8
3.	MTK	5	3	0	2	11	16	6
4.	Nemzeti SC	5	2	0	3	13	19	4
5.	MAC	5	1	0	4	6	21	2
6.	Újpesti TE	5	0	0	5	4	21	0

* M: Matches W: Win D: Drawn L: Lost G+: Goals earned G−: Goals got P: Point

OB I 1926
Champions

Ferencváros
11th Title

== 2. Class ==
1. MUE 12, 2. BSZKRT SE 10, 3. OTE 8, 4. BEAC 6, 5. Bankszövetség 4, 6. Postás 2, 7. BAK 0 points.

== Countryside ==
1. MOVE Eger SE, 2. Szegedi UE, 3. Bajai SE, 4. Tatatóvárosi AC

== Sources ==
- Gyarmati Dezső: Aranykor (Hérodotosz Könyvkiadó és Értékesítő Bt., Budapest, 2002.)
- Sport-évkönyv 1926
- Nemzeti Spoert 1926. 08. 02
