= 1948 Országos Bajnokság I (men's water polo) =

Water polo league season

OB I
- Season: 1948
- Champions: Újpest

1948 Országos Bajnokság I (men's water polo) was the 42nd water polo championship in Hungary. Ten teams played one-round match for the title.

== Final list ==
#	Team	M	W	D	L	G+	G−	P
1.	Újpesti TE	9	9	0	0	45	10	18
2.	MAFC	9	8	0	1	33	10	16
3.	MTK	9	6	1	2	43	19	13
4.	Ferencvárosi TC	9	5	1	3	40	15	11
5.	Vasas SC	9	4	2	3	34	18	10
6.	Egri SZTK	9	4	1	4	34	14	9
7.	Nemzeti SC	9	2	1	6	11	30	5
8.	Szentesi MÁV	9	2	0	7	14	41	4
9.	Közalkalmazottak SE	9	1	1	7	11	63	3
10.	Szegedi MTE	9	0	1	8	9	54	1

* M: Matches W: Win D: Drawn L: Lost G+: Goals earned G−: Goals got P: Point

OB I 1948
Champions

Újpest
15th Title

== 2. Class ==
1. Csepeli MTK 20, 2. Előre 19 (1), 3. MTE 18, 4. Neményi 15, 5. BEAC 14 (2), III. ker. TVE 10 (1), BRE 9, TASE 9, Postás 4 (1), MÁVAG 4 (1), VAC 2 (1), Tipográfia 0 point. In parentheses number of matches is missed.

== Sources ==
- Gyarmati Dezső: Aranykor (Hérodotosz Könyvkiadó és Értékesítő Bt., Budapest, 2002.)
