= 1950 Országos Bajnokság I (men's water polo) =

Water polo league season

OB I
- Season: 1950
- Champions: Újpest

1950 Országos Bajnokság I (men's water polo) was the 44th water polo championship in Hungary. There were ten teams who played two-round match for the title.

== Final list ==
#	Team	M	W	D	L	G+	G−	P
1.	Bp. Dózsa (Újpest)	18	17	0	1	133	42	34
2.	Bp. Vasas	18	15	1	2	140	57	31
3.	Bp. Honvéd	18	10	1	7	82	72	21
4.	ÉDOSZ SE (Ferencváros)	18	10	0	8	110	82	20
5.	Egri ÁVESZ	18	9	2	7	84	78	20
6.	Szolnoki MTE	18	6	3	9	59	99	15
7.	Bp. Lokomotív	18	5	3	10	79	109	13
8.	Textiles SE (MTK)	18	5	2	11	48	87	12
9.	Bp. Előre	18	2	3	13	48	89	7
10.	Tatabányai Tárna	18	2	3	13	70	138	7

* M: Matches W: Win D: Drawn L: Lost G+: Goals earned G−: Goals got P: Point

OB I 1950
Champions

Újpest
16th Title

== Sources ==
- Gyarmati Dezső: Aranykor (Hérodotosz Könyvkiadó és Értékesítő Bt., Budapest, 2002.)
