= 1988–89 Országos Bajnokság I (men's water polo) =

Water polo league season

OB I
- Season: 1988–89
- Champions: Vasas SC

1988–89 Országos Bajnokság I (men's water polo) was the 83rd water polo championship in Hungary.

== First stage ==
#	Team	M	W	D	L	G+	G−	P	Comments
1.	Vasas SC	26	21	4	1	335	243	46	
2.	Újpesti Dózsa	26	18	2	6	269	210	38	
3.	Ferencvárosi TC	26	16	6	4	321	255	38	
4.	Szolnoki Vízügy	26	16	5	5	284	256	37	
5.	Szentesi Vízmű	26	15	3	8	309	281	33	
6.	Tatabányai Bányász	26	12	2	12	222	243	26	
7.	Szeged SC	26	12	3	11	206	211	25	deducted 2 points
8.	Bp. Spartacus	26	11	2	13	305	284	24	
9.	Eger SE	26	11	2	13	246	256	24	
10.	OSC	26	8	4	14	234	242	20	
11.	Tungsram SC	26	8	2	16	276	286	18	
12.	BVSC	26	7	3	16	253	270	17	
13.	Bp. Honvéd	26	6	2	18	215	292	14	
14.	KSI	26	1	0	25	249	395	2	

Championship Playoff

Pld - Played; W - Won; L - Lost; PF - Points for; PA - Points against; Diff - Difference; Pts - Points.

== Championship Playoff ==
Semifinals
1	Vasas SC	12	8	10
4	Szolnoki Vízügy	9	11	6
2	Újpesti Dózsa	16	9	12
3	Ferencvárosi TC	17	8	9

Final
1	Vasas SC	14	13
2	Újpesti Dózsa	9	12
Third place
4	Szolnoki Vízügy	13	16	11
3	Ferencvárosi TC	19	9	15

OB I 1988–89
Champions

Vasas
13th Title

== Sources ==
- Gyarmati Dezső: Aranykor (Hérodotosz Könyvkiadó és Értékesítő Bt., Budapest, 2002.)
