= 1969 Országos Bajnokság I (men's water polo) =

Water polo league season

OB I
- Season: 1969
- Champions: Orvosegyetem

1969 Országos Bajnokság I (men's water polo) was the 63rd water polo championship in Hungary. There were ten teams who played two-round match for the title.

== Final list ==
| # | Team | M | W | D | L | G+ | G− | P |
|---|---|---|---|---|---|---|---|---|
| 1. | OSC | 18 | 13 | 5 | 0 | 100 | 56 | 31 |
| 2. | Ferencvárosi TC | 18 | 13 | 2 | 3 | 110 | 76 | 28 |
| 3. | Egri Dózsa | 18 | 10 | 5 | 3 | 95 | 75 | 25 |
| 4. | Szolnoki Dózsa | 18 | 11 | 2 | 5 | 92 | 80 | 24 |
| 5. | Bp. Honvéd | 18 | 8 | 3 | 7 | 82 | 81 | 19 |
| 6. | Újpesti Dózsa | 18 | 6 | 5 | 7 | 65 | 62 | 17 |
| 7. | Vasas SC | 18 | 5 | 3 | 10 | 79 | 87 | 13 |
| 8. | BVSC | 18 | 4 | 4 | 10 | 70 | 82 | 12 |
| 9. | Bp. Spartacus | 18 | 4 | 3 | 11 | 79 | 95 | 11 |
| 10. | MTK | 18 | 0 | 0 | 18 | 61 | 139 | 0 |

* M: Matches W: Win D: Drawn L: Lost G+: Goals earned G−: Goals got P: Point

OB I 1969
Champions

Orvosegyetem
1st Title

== Sources ==
- Gyarmati Dezső: Aranykor (Hérodotosz Könyvkiadó és Értékesítő Bt., Budapest, 2002.)
