= 1970 Országos Bajnokság I (men's water polo) =

64th water polo championship in Hungary

OB I
- Season: 1970
- Champions: Orvosegyetem

1970 Országos Bajnokság I (men's water polo) was the 64th water polo championship in Hungary. There were ten teams who played a two-round match for the title.

== Final list ==
| # | Team | M | W | D | L | G+ | G− | P |
|---|---|---|---|---|---|---|---|---|
| 1. | OSC | 18 | 18 | 0 | 0 | 104 | 46 | 36 |
| 2. | Szolnoki Dózsa | 18 | 9 | 7 | 2 | 84 | 70 | 25 |
| 3. | Ferencvárosi TC | 18 | 9 | 4 | 5 | 64 | 55 | 22 |
| 4. | Újpesti Dózsa | 18 | 7 | 6 | 5 | 70 | 61 | 20 |
| 5. | Egri Dózsa | 18 | 6 | 5 | 7 | 79 | 81 | 17 |
| 6. | Bp. Spartacus | 18 | 5 | 5 | 8 | 69 | 87 | 15 |
| 7. | Vasas Izzó | 18 | 6 | 2 | 10 | 74 | 86 | 14 |
| 8. | Vasas SC | 18 | 4 | 3 | 11 | 62 | 73 | 11 |
| 9. | Bp. Honvéd | 18 | 2 | 6 | 10 | 68 | 90 | 10 |
| 10. | BVSC | 18 | 3 | 4 | 11 | 62 | 87 | 10 |

* M: Matches W: Win D: Drawn L: Lost G+: Goals earned G−: Goals got P: Point

OB I 1970
Champions

Orvosegyetem
2nd Title

== Sources ==
- Gyarmati Dezső: Aranykor (Hérodotosz Könyvkiadó és Értékesítő Bt., Budapest, 2002.)
