= 1958 Országos Bajnokság I (men's water polo) =

52nd Hungarian water polo championship

OB I
- Season: 1958
- Champions: Szolnok

1958 Országos Bajnokság I (men's water polo) was the 52nd water polo championship in Hungary. There were ten teams who played two-round match for the title.

== Final list ==
| # | Team | M | W | D | L | G+ | G− | Diff | Pts | Notes |
|---|---|---|---|---|---|---|---|---|---|---|
| 1st place, gold medalist(s) | Szolnoki Dózsa | 18 | 12 | 6 | 0 | 87 | 32 | +55 | 30 | Champion |
| 2nd place, silver medalist(s) | Újpesti Dózsa | 18 | 11 | 5 | 2 | 70 | 41 | +29 | 27 | |
| 3rd place, bronze medalist(s) | BVSC | 18 | 11 | 3 | 4 | 86 | 75 | +11 | 25 | |
| 4 | Vasas SC | 18 | 9 | 6 | 3 | 87 | 60 | +27 | 24 | |
| 5 | Ferencvárosi TC | 18 | 10 | 4 | 4 | 73 | 57 | +16 | 24 | |
| 6 | Bp. Honvéd | 18 | 8 | 4 | 6 | 58 | 59 | −1 | 20 | |
| 7 | Újpesti Tungsram TE | 18 | 6 | 1 | 11 | 44 | 56 | −12 | 13 | |
| 8 | Bp. Spartacus | 18 | 4 | 3 | 11 | 49 | 66 | −17 | 11 | |
| 9 | Bp. Vörös Meteor | 18 | 2 | 2 | 14 | 42 | 94 | −52 | 6 | |
| 10 | MTK | 18 | 0 | 0 | 18 | 38 | 94 | −56 | 0 | Relegated to Országos Bajnokság II |

* M: Matches W: Win D: Drawn L: Lost G+: Goals earned G−: Goals got P: Point

1958 OB I Champions

Szolnoki Dózsa
3rd Title

Dr. Ottó Boros, István Brinza, Dr. Ferenc Hasznos, György Hegmann, Tivadar Kanizsa, József Kelemen, István Koncz, Ferenc Kuczora, István Pintér, Kázmér Szegedi Varga
Head coach: István Goór

== Sources ==
- Gyarmati Dezső: Aranykor (Hérodotosz Könyvkiadó és Értékesítő Bt., Budapest, 2002.)
