= 1927 Országos Bajnokság I (men's water polo) =

Water polo league season

OB I
- Season: 1927
- Champions: Ferencváros

1927 Országos Bajnokság I (men's water polo) was the 21st water polo championship in Hungary. There were seven teams who played one-round match for the title.

== Final list ==
#	Team	M	W	D	L	G+	G−	P
1.	Ferencvárosi TC	6	6	0	0	40	11	12
2.	III. ker. TVE	6	5	0	1	43	10	10
3.	MTK	6	3	0	2	24	14	8
4.	Újpesti TE	6	2	0	3	28	19	6
5.	MAC	6	2	0	4	14	25	4
6.	Nemzeti SC	6	1	0	5	13	43	2
7.	MUE	6	0	0	6	6	46	0

* M: Matches W: Win D: Drawn L: Lost G+: Goals earned G−: Goals got P: Point

OB I 1927
Champions

Ferencváros
12th Title

== 2. Class ==
1. OTE 8, 2. BSZKRT SE 4, 3. BEAC 4 pont, Postás and VAC cancelled their participation.

== Countryside ==
1. MOVE Eger SE, 2. Szegedi UE, 3. Pannonia UE Sopron, 4. Tatatóvárosi AC.

== Sources ==
- Gyarmati Dezső: Aranykor (Hérodotosz Könyvkiadó és Értékesítő Bt., Budapest, 2002.)
- Sport-évkönyv 1927
