= 1920 Országos Bajnokság I (men's water polo) =

Water polo league season

OB I
- Season: 1920
- Champions: Ferencváros

1920 Országos Bajnokság I (men's water polo) was the 14th water polo championship in Hungary. There were four teams who played one round match for the title.

== Final list ==
#	Team	M	W	D	L	G+	G−	P
1.	Ferencvárosi TC	3	3	0	0	10	2	6
2.	III. ker. TVE	3	2	0	1	7	4	4
3.	MAFC	3	1	0	2	6	7	2
4.	Nemzeti SC	3	0	0	3	0	10	0

* M: Matches W: Win D: Drawn L: Lost G+: Goals earned G−: Goals got P: Point

OB I 1920
Champions

Ferencváros
7th Title

== Sources ==
- Gyarmati Dezső: Aranykor (Hérodotosz Könyvkiadó és Értékesítő Bt., Budapest, 2002.)
