= 1953 Országos Bajnokság I (men's water polo) =

Water polo league season

OB I
- Season: 1953
- Champions: Vasas

1953 Országos Bajnokság I (men's water polo) was the 47th water polo championship in Hungary. There were ten teams who played two-round match for the title.

== Final list ==
#	Team	M	W	D	L	G+	G−	P
1.	Bp. Vasas	18	13	5	0	79	35	31
2.	Bp. Dózsa (Újpest)	18	12	3	3	82	40	27
3.	Bp. Vörös Lobogó (MTK)	18	12	3	3	60	34	27
4.	Szolnoki Dózsa	18	11	3	4	67	35	25
5.	Bp. Honvéd	18	8	6	4	76	40	22
6.	Bp. Kinizsi (Ferencváros)	18	8	1	9	74	62	17
7.	Egri Fáklya	18	5	4	9	58	73	14
8.	Szegedi Dózsa	18	1	4	13	33	76	6
9.	Vasas Izzó	18	2	2	14	32	115	6
10.	Bp. Lokomotív (BVSC)	18	1	3	14	34	85	5

* M: Matches W: Win D: Drawn L: Lost G+: Goals earned G−: Goals got P: Point

OB I 1953
Champions

Vasas
3rd Title

== 2. Class ==
Budapest: 1. Vasas GD Hajógyár 33, 2. Fáklya Opera 33, 3. Bp. Szikra 20, 4. III. ker. Vörös Lobogó 20, 5. Bp. Haladás 18, 6. Bp. Előre 15, 7. Vasas MÁVAG 13, 8. Csepeli Vasas 13, 9. Előre MÁVAUT 8, 10. Bp. Vörös Meteor 7 point.

== Sources ==
- Gyarmati Dezső: Aranykor (Hérodotosz Könyvkiadó és Értékesítő Bt., Budapest, 2002.)
