= 1944 Országos Bajnokság I (men's water polo) =

Water polo league season

OB I
- Season: 1944
- Champions: Ferencváros

1944 Országos Bajnokság I (men's water polo) was the 38th water polo championship in Hungary. There were eleven teams who played one-round match for the title.

== Final list ==
#	Team	M	W	D	L	G+	G−	P
1.	Ferencvárosi TC	10	8	2	0	37	10	18
2.	Újpesti TE	10	8	1	1	71	9	17
3.	BSE	10	8	1	1	36	12	17
4.	MAC	10	8	0	2	47	9	16
5.	MAFC	10	6	0	4	32	14	12
6.	Csepeli GyTK	10	3	1	6	22	41	7
7.	Szegedi UE	10	3	1	6	15	39	7
8.	Tatabányai SC	10	3	0	7	20	35	6
9.	MUE	10	3	0	7	22	52	6
10.	Gamma SE	10	2	0	8	12	53	4
11.	Marosvásárhelyi SE	10	0	0	10	2	42	0

* M: Matches W: Win D: Drawn L: Lost G+: Goals earned G−: Goals got P: Point

OB I 1944
Champions

Ferencváros
13th Title

== Sources ==
- Gyarmati Dezső: Aranykor (Hérodotosz Könyvkiadó és Értékesítő Bt., Budapest, 2002.)
