= 1978 Országos Bajnokság I (men's water polo) =

Water polo league season

OB I
- Season: 1978
- Champions: Orvosegyetem

1978 Országos Bajnokság I (men's water polo) was the 72nd water polo championship in Hungary. There were twelve teams who played two-round match for the title.

== Final list ==
#	Team	M	W	D	L	G+	G−	P
1.	OSC	22	18	3	1	134	80	39
2.	Újpesti Dózsa	22	15	3	4	123	95	33
3.	Ferencvárosi TC	22	12	6	4	134	112	30
4.	BVSC	22	12	4	6	138	119	28
5.	Vasas SC	22	12	4	6	124	106	28
6.	Vasas Izzó	22	7	5	10	111	114	19
7.	Bp. Spartacus	22	8	3	11	91	101	19
8.	Szolnoki Vízügy	22	7	2	13	106	131	16
9.	Szentesi Vízmű	22	6	2	14	98	130	14
10.	Szegedi EOL AK	22	4	5	13	83	103	13
11.	Tatabányai Bányász	22	5	3	14	78	107	13
12.	Eger SE	22	5	2	15	91	113	12

* M: Matches W: Win D: Drawn L: Lost G+: Goals earned G−: Goals got P: Point

OB I 1978
Champions

Orvosegyetem
7th Title

== Sources ==
- Gyarmati Dezső: Aranykor (Hérodotosz Könyvkiadó és Értékesítő Bt., Budapest, 2002.)
