= 1947 Országos Bajnokság I (men's water polo) =

Water polo league season

OB I
- Season: 1947
- Champions: Vasas

1947 Országos Bajnokság I (men's water polo) was the 41st water polo championship in Hungary. There were twelve teams who played one-round match for the title.

== Final list ==
| # | Team | M | W | D | L | G+ | G− | P |
|---|---|---|---|---|---|---|---|---|
| 1. | Vasas SC | 11 | 10 | 0 | 1 | 81 | 18 | 20 |
| 2. | Újpesti TE | 11 | 9 | 1 | 1 | 80 | 12 | 19 |
| 3. | Ferencvárosi TC | 11 | 8 | 2 | 1 | 61 | 15 | 18 |
| 4. | MTK | 11 | 7 | 1 | 3 | 76 | 28 | 15 |
| 5. | MAFC | 11 | 4 | 4 | 3 | 29 | 17 | 12 |
| 6. | Nemzeti SC | 11 | 5 | 1 | 5 | 36 | 36 | 11 |
| 7. | Egri Barátság | 11 | 5 | 1 | 5 | 34 | 32 | 11 |
| 8. | MMUE | 11 | 4 | 2 | 5 | 37 | 28 | 10 |
| 9. | Szegedi MTE | 11 | 4 | 1 | 6 | 34 | 48 | 9 |
| 10. | Előre SE | 11 | 2 | 1 | 8 | 19 | 39 | 5 |
| 11. | Csepeli MTK | 11 | 1 | 0 | 10 | 9 | 82 | 2 |
| 12. | Tipográfia NYTE | 11 | 0 | 0 | 11 | 2 | 133 | 0 |

* M: Matches W: Win D: Drawn L: Lost G+: Goals earned G−: Goals got P: Point

OB I 1947
Champions

Vasas
1st Title

== 2. Class ==
1. KaSE 14, 2. Neményi MADISZ 13, 3. MTE 13, 4. Tatabányai SC 12, 5. BEAC 6, 6. Cegléd 6, 7. Postás 4, 8. VAC 2, 9. MÁVAG 0 point. A BEAC-Postás match result was fail.

== Sources ==
- Gyarmati Dezső: Aranykor (Hérodotosz Könyvkiadó és Értékesítő Bt., Budapest, 2002.)
