= 1929 Országos Bajnokság I (men's water polo) =

Water polo league season

OB I
- Season: 1929
- Champions: Magyar AC

1929 Országos Bajnokság I (men's water polo) was the 23rd water polo championship in Hungary. There were nine teams who played one round match for the title. It was the first time when teams from outside Budapest also participated in the championship. From this season it is called National Championship.

== Final list ==
| # | Team | M | W | D | L | G+ | G− | P |
|---|---|---|---|---|---|---|---|---|
| 1. | MAC | 8 | 6 | 1 | 1 | 29 | 7 | 13 |
| 2. | Újpesti TE | 8 | 5 | 3 | 0 | 53 | 13 | 13 |
| 3. | III. ker. TVE | 8 | 5 | 2 | 1 | 36 | 10 | 12 |
| 4. | MTK | 8 | 4 | 3 | 1 | 35 | 13 | 11 |
| 5. | MOVE Eger SE | 8 | 5 | 1 | 2 | 23 | 15 | 11 |
| 6. | Szegedi UE | 8 | 3 | 0 | 5 | 15 | 36 | 6 |
| 7. | Ferencvárosi TC | 8 | 2 | 0 | 6 | 20 | 29 | 4 |
| 8. | BSZKRT SE | 8 | 1 | 0 | 7 | 11 | 43 | 2 |
| 9. | Nemzeti SC | 8 | 0 | 0 | 8 | 3 | 59 | 0 |

* M: Matches W: Win D: Drawn L: Lost G+: Goals earned G−: Goals got P: Point

OB I 1929
Champions

Magyar AC
1st Title

== 2. Class ==
1. MUE 8, 2. Tatabányai SC 6, 3. Orosházi TK 4, 4. BSE 0^{(2)}, 5. Tatatóvárosi AC 0 pont. Penalty points are in brackets.

== Sources ==
- Gyarmati Dezső: Aranykor (Hérodotosz Könyvkiadó és Értékesítő Bt., Budapest, 2002.)
- Sport-évkönyv 1929
