= András Gyöngyösi =

Hungarian water polo player

Personal information
- Nationality: Hungarian
- Born: 23 January 1968 (age 57); Budapest, Hungary

Sport
- Sport: Water polo

András Gyöngyösi (born 23 January 1968) is a Hungarian water polo player. He competed at the 1988 Summer Olympics, the 1992 Summer Olympics and the 1996 Summer Olympics.
