= 1976 Országos Bajnokság I (men's water polo) =

Water polo league season

OB I
- Season: 1976
- Champions: Vasas

1976 Országos Bajnokság I (men's water polo) was the 70th water polo championship in Hungary. There were twelve teams who played two-round match for the title.

== Final list ==
#	Team	M	W	D	L	G+	G−	P
1.	Vasas SC	22	19	3	0	125	63	41
2.	Újpesti Dózsa	22	17	2	3	116	76	36
3.	OSC	22	15	4	3	134	94	34
4.	Ferencvárosi TC	22	10	5	7	94	86	25
5.	Bp. Spartacus	22	10	4	8	97	88	24
6.	Bp. Honvéd	22	10	2	10	86	95	22
7.	Vasas Izzó	22	6	5	11	86	93	17
8.	BVSC	22	7	3	12	97	98	17
9.	Szentesi Vízmű	22	4	7	11	98	123	15
10.	Szolnoki Vízügy-Dózsa	22	4	5	13	80	118	13
11.	Szegedi EOL SC	22	4	5	13	76	115	13
12.	Egri Dózsa	22	1	5	16	90	130	7

* M: Matches W: Win D: Drawn L: Lost G+: Goals earned G−: Goals got P: Point

OB I 1976
Champions

Vasas
5th Title

== Sources ==
- Gyarmati Dezső: Aranykor (Hérodotosz Könyvkiadó és Értékesítő Bt., Budapest, 2002.)
