= 1971 Országos Bajnokság I (men's water polo) =

Water polo league season

OB I
- Season: 1971
- Champions: Orvosegyetem

1971 Országos Bajnokság I (men's water polo) was the 65th water polo championship in Hungary. There were ten teams who played two-round match for the title.

== Final list ==
#	Team	M	W	D	L	G+	G−	P
1.	OSC	18	11	7	0	95	68	29
2.	Újpesti Dózsa	18	10	6	2	83	63	26
3.	Ferencvárosi TC	18	10	3	5	81	65	23
4.	Vasas SC	18	5	9	4	78	75	19
5.	Bp. Spartacus	18	5	8	5	55	56	18
6.	Vasas Izzó	18	6	6	6	77	78	18
7.	Bp. Honvéd	18	5	6	7	84	83	16
8.	Szolnoki Dózsa	18	5	5	8	75	80	15
9.	Egri Dózsa	18	5	4	9	90	93	14
10.	Tatabányai Bányász	18	0	2	16	68	125	2

* M: Matches W: Win D: Drawn L: Lost G+: Goals earned G−: Goals got P: Point

OB I 1971
Champions

Orvosegyetem
3rd Title

== Sources ==
- Gyarmati Dezső: Aranykor (Hérodotosz Könyvkiadó és Értékesítő Bt., Budapest, 2002.)
