= Imre Péter =

Hungarian water polo player

Personal information
- Nationality: Hungarian
- Born: 1 April 1970 (age 56) Budapest, Hungary

Sport
- Sport: Water polo
Medal record
Representing Hungary
World Championships
Bronze medal – third place	1991 Perth	Team competition
European Championships
Silver medal – second place	1993 Sheffield	Team competition

Imre Péter (born 1 April 1970) is a Hungarian water polo player. He competed in the men's tournament at the 1992 Summer Olympics.

== See also ==
- List of World Aquatics Championships medalists in water polo
