= 1962 Országos Bajnokság I (men's water polo) =

Water polo league season

OB I
- Season: 1962
- Champions: Ferencváros

1962 Országos Bajnokság I (men's water polo) was the 56th water polo championship in Hungary. There were ten teams who played two-round match for the title.

== Final list ==
#	Team	M	W	D	L	G+	G−	Pts	Notes
1.	Ferencvárosi TC	18	13	5	0	77	45	31	Champion
2.	BVSC	18	9	8	1	74	51	26	
3.	Szolnoki Dózsa	18	12	1	5	73	44	25	
4.	Újpesti Dózsa	18	8	5	5	73	60	24	
5.	Bp. Honvéd	18	7	3	8	73	66	17	
6.	20px Egri Dózsa	18	7	3	8	85	85	17	
7.	Vasas SC	18	5	3	10	68	85	13	
8.	Vasas Izzó	18	3	6	9	72	94	12	
9.	Bp. Spartacus	18	4	1	13	71	84	9	
10.	Szentesi Kinizsi	18	4	1	13	59	111	9	Relegated to Országos Bajnokság II

* M: Matches W: Win D: Drawn L: Lost G+: Goals earned G−: Goals got P: Point

1962 OB I Champions
Ferencvárosi TC
15th Title

== Sources ==
- Gyarmati Dezső: Aranykor (Hérodotosz Könyvkiadó és Értékesítő Bt., Budapest, 2002.)
