= 1928 Országos Bajnokság I (men's water polo) =

Water polo league season

OB I
- Season: 1928
- Champions: III. Kerületi TVE

1928 Országos Bajnokság I (men's water polo) was the 22nd water polo championship in Hungary. There were seven teams who played one round match for the title.

== Final list ==
#	Team	M	W	D	L	G+	G−	P
1.	III. ker. TVE	6	5	0	1	38	6	10
2.	Ferencvárosi TC	6	4	1	1	30	8	9
3.	Újpesti TE	6	4	0	2	33	14	8
4.	MAC	6	3	1	2	21	10	7
5.	MTK	6	3	0	3	21	12	6
6.	Nemzeti SC	6	1	0	5	8	35	2
7.	Óbudai TE	6	0	0	6	4	70	0

* M: Matches W: Win D: Drawn L: Lost G+: Goals earned G−: Goals got P: Point

OB I 1928
Champions

III. Kerületi TVE
3rd Title

== 2. Class ==
1. OTE 8, 2. BSZKRT SE 4, 3. BEAC 4 pont, Postás and VAC cancelled their participation.

== Countryside ==
1. Szegedi UE, 2. MOVE Eger SE, 3. Orosházi TK, 4. Tatabányai SC.

== Sources ==
- Gyarmati Dezső: Aranykor (Hérodotosz Könyvkiadó és Értékesítő Bt., Budapest, 2002.)
- Sport-évkönyv 1928
