= 1972 Országos Bajnokság I (men's water polo) =

Water polo league season

OB I
- Season: 1972
- Champions: Orvosegyetem

1972 Országos Bajnokság I (men's water polo) was the 66th water polo championship in Hungary. There were ten teams who played two-round match for the title.

== Final list ==
#	Team	M	W	D	L	G+	G−	P
1.	OSC	18	13	3	2	101	73	29
2.	Újpesti Dózsa	18	12	2	4	93	80	26
3.	Ferencvárosi TC	18	11	3	4	82	66	25
4.	Vasas SC	18	7	7	4	75	67	21
5.	Vasas Izzó	18	7	5	6	72	68	19
6.	Bp. Honvéd	18	5	6	7	90	95	16
7.	Egri Dózsa	18	5	5	8	86	94	15
8.	Bp. Spartacus	18	3	6	9	58	77	12
9.	BVSC	18	4	3	11	71	92	11
10.	Szolnoki Dózsa	18	0	8	10	76	90	8

* M: Matches W: Win D: Drawn L: Lost G+: Goals earned G−: Goals got P: Point

OB I 1972
Champions

Orvosegyetem
4th Title

== Sources ==
- Gyarmati Dezső: Aranykor (Hérodotosz Könyvkiadó és Értékesítő Bt., Budapest, 2002.)
