= 1954 Országos Bajnokság I (men's water polo) =

Water polo league season

OB I
- Season: 1954
- Champions: Szolnok

1954 Országos Bajnokság I (men's water polo) was the 48th water polo championship in Hungary. There were twelve teams who played one-round match for the title.

== Final list ==
#	Team	M	W	D	L	G+	G−	P
1.	Szolnoki Dózsa	11	9	2	0	41	20	20
2.	Bp. Dózsa (Újpest)	11	9	1	1	71	26	19
3.	Bp. Honvéd	11	9	1	1	44	22	19
4.	Bp. Vasas	11	8	0	3	57	26	16
5.	Bp. Vörös Lobogó (MTK)	11	6	2	3	36	28	14
6.	Bp. Lokomotív (BVSC)	11	5	2	4	40	32	12
7.	Bp. Kinizsi (Ferencváros)	11	5	1	5	32	32	11
8.	Vasas Gheorghiu Dej Hajógyár	11	3	1	7	30	47	7
9.	Egri Fáklya	11	3	1	7	29	58	7
10.	Fáklya Opera	11	1	1	9	29	60	3
11.	Vasas Izzó	11	0	2	9	19	55	2
12.	Szegedi Dózsa	11	1	0	10	20	63	2

* M: Matches W: Win D: Drawn L: Lost G+: Goals earned G−: Goals got P: Point

OB I 1954
Champions

Szolnok
1st Title

== Sources ==
- Gyarmati Dezső: Aranykor (Hérodotosz Könyvkiadó és Értékesítő Bt., Budapest, 2002.)
