= 1973 Országos Bajnokság I (men's water polo) =

Water polo league season

OB I
- Season: 1973
- Champions: Orvosegyetem

1973 Országos Bajnokság I (men's water polo) was the 67th water polo championship in Hungary. There were ten teams who played two-round match for the title.

== Final list ==
#	Team	M	W	D	L	G+	G−	P
1.	OSC	18	12	6	0	100	66	30
2.	Újpesti Dózsa	18	8	7	3	81	66	23
3.	Ferencvárosi TC	18	9	4	5	75	70	22
4.	Egri Dózsa	18	7	5	6	106	91	19
5.	Vasas SC	18	7	5	6	85	76	19
6.	BVSC	18	8	2	8	81	82	18
7.	Vasas Izzó	18	5	7	6	75	79	17
8.	Bp. Spartacus	18	5	7	6	64	65	17
9.	Bp. Honvéd	18	4	3	11	66	89	11
10.	Szentesi Vízmű	18	1	2	15	68	117	4

* M: Matches W: Win D: Drawn L: Lost G+: Goals earned G−: Goals got P: Point

OB I 1973
Champions

Orvosegyetem
5th Title

== Sources ==
- Gyarmati Dezső: Aranykor (Hérodotosz Könyvkiadó és Értékesítő Bt., Budapest, 2002.)
