= Attila Takács =

Hungarian gymnast (1929–2011)

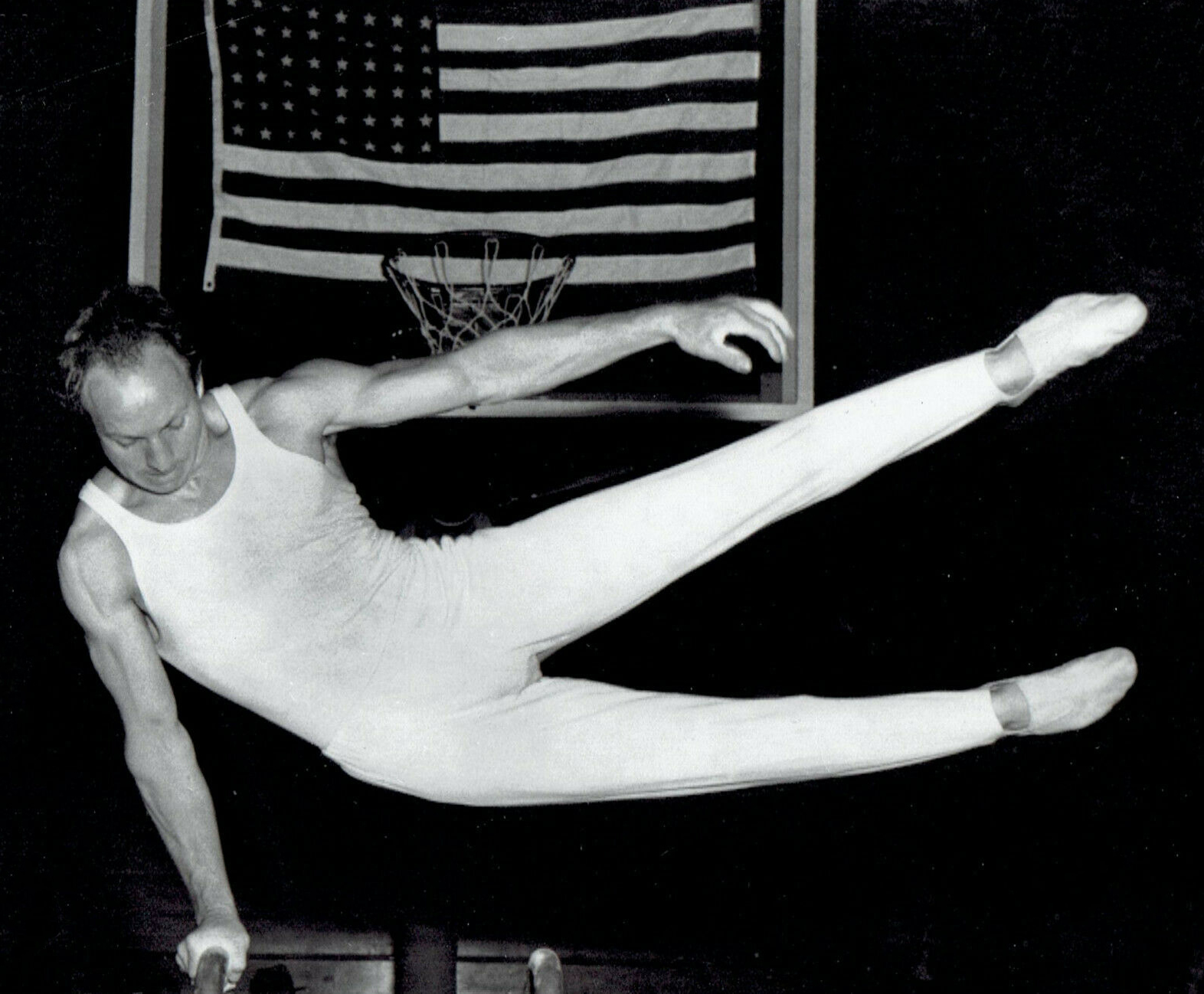
- Takács touring the U.S. in 1957

Personal information
- Alternative name: Attila Takach
- Born: 19 January 1929 Budapest, Hungary
- Died: 24 February 2011 (aged 82) Los Gatos, California, U.S.

Gymnastics career
- Discipline: Men's artistic gymnastics
- Country represented: Hungary
- Club: Budapesti Honvéd Sportegyesület

Attila Takács (later Takach; 19 January 1929 – 24 February 2011) was a Hungarian gymnast. He competed in all artistic gymnastics events at the 1956 Summer Olympics with the best result of 11th place on the vault.

After the 1956 Olympics Takács, together with his fiancée Magda, defected to the United States, in response to the Soviet suppression of the Hungarian Revolution of 1956. They lived near Los Angeles, where Takács studied electrical engineering at the University of Southern California. He then worked for the aerospace industry, before moving to the Silicon Valley in the mid-1970s, where he was involved in the development of recording media such as LaserDisc.
