= 1968 Országos Bajnokság I (men's water polo) =

Water polo league season

OB I
- Season: 1968
- Champions: Ferencváros

1968 Országos Bajnokság I (men's water polo) was the 62nd water polo championship in Hungary. There were ten teams who played two-round match for the title.

== Final list ==
#	Team	M	W	D	L	G+	G−	P	Megjegyzés
1.	Ferencvárosi TC	16	13	2	1	89	41	28	
2.	OSC	16	10	4	2	90	60	24	
3.	Bp. Honvéd	16	7	7	2	72	60	21	
4.	Szolnoki Dózsa	16	6	6	4	86	87	18	
5.	Bp. Spartacus	16	5	6	5	66	67	16	
6.	Újpesti Dózsa	16	5	5	6	76	72	15	
7.	Egri Dózsa	16	3	5	8	71	86	11	
8.	BVSC	16	4	1	11	56	86	9	
9.	Vasas SC	16	0	2	14	48	95	2	
	Csepel Autó	-	-	-	-	-	-	-	deleted

* M: Matches W: Win D: Drawn L: Lost G+: Goals earned G−: Goals got P: Point

OB I 1968
Champions

Ferencváros
18th Title

== Sources ==
- Gyarmati Dezső: Aranykor (Hérodotosz Könyvkiadó és Értékesítő Bt., Budapest, 2002.)
