= 1956 Országos Bajnokság I (men's water polo) =

Water polo league season

OB I
- Season: 1956
- Champions: Ferencváros

1956 Országos Bajnokság I (men's water polo) was the 50th water polo championship in Hungary. There were ten teams who played one-round match for the title.

== Final list ==
#	Team	M	W	D	L	G+	G−	P
1.	Bp. Kinizsi (Ferencváros)	9	7	1	1	48	16	15
2.	Bp. Dózsa (Újpest)	9	7	1	1	48	18	15
3.	Bp. Vasas	9	6	2	1	39	21	14
4.	Bp. Honvéd	9	4	5	0	41	19	13
5.	Szolnoki Dózsa	9	3	3	3	29	22	9
6.	Bp. Vörös Lobogó (MTK)	9	2	4	3	26	28	8
7.	Bp. Törekvés (BVSC)	9	3	1	5	40	38	7
8.	Bp. Spartacus	9	3	0	6	27	42	6
9.	Vasas Gheorghiu Dej Hajógyár	9	1	1	7	20	61	3
10.	Egri Bástya	9	0	0	9	9	62	0

* M: Matches W: Win D: Drawn L: Lost G+: Goals earned G−: Goals got P: Point

OB I 1956
Champions

Ferencváros
14th Title

== Sources ==
- Gyarmati Dezső: Aranykor (Hérodotosz Könyvkiadó és Értékesítő Bt., Budapest, 2002.)
