= 1963 Országos Bajnokság I (men's water polo) =

Water polo league season

OB I
- Season: 1963
- Champions: Ferencváros

1963 Országos Bajnokság I (men's water polo) was the 57th water polo championship in Hungary. There were ten teams who played two-round match for the title.

== Final list ==
#	Team	M	W	D	L	G+	G−	Pts	Notes
1.	Ferencvárosi TC	18	14	3	1	72	41	31	Champion
2.	Szolnoki Dózsa	18	12	3	3	78	52	27	
3.	Újpesti Dózsa	18	10	3	5	63	44	23	
4.	BVSC	18	8	4	6	63	49	20	
5.	Bp. Honvéd	18	8	4	6	65	54	20	
6.	Csepel Autó	18	6	4	8	54	60	16	
7.	20px Egri Dózsa	18	6	3	9	54	72	15	
8.	Bp. Spartacus	18	5	4	9	50	56	14	
9.	Vasas SC	18	3	5	10	51	77	11	
10.	Vasas Izzó	18	0	3	15	48	93	3	Relegated to Országos Bajnokság II

* M: Matches W: Win D: Drawn L: Lost G+: Goals earned G−: Goals got P: Point

1963 OB I Champions
Ferencváros
16th Title

== Sources ==
- Gyarmati Dezső: Aranykor (Hérodotosz Könyvkiadó és Értékesítő Bt., Budapest, 2002.)
