= Országos Bajnokság I (men's water polo) =

Water polo league

- Sport: Water Polo
- Founded: 1904; 122 years ago
- No. of teams: 14
- Country: Hungary
- Confederation: LEN (Europe)
- Most recent champion: Ferencváros (28th title) (2025–26)
- Most titles: Ferencváros (28 titles)
- Broadcaster: M4 Sport
- Relegation to: Országos Bajnokság I/B
- Domestic cup: Magyar Kupa
- International cups: LEN Champions League; LEN Euro Cup
- Website: waterpolo.hu

Országos Bajnokság I (English: Nationwide Championship I, commonly abbreviated OB I) is the highest level water polo league for men in Hungary, that is administered and supervised by the Hungarian Water Polo Federation. Since 2009, after signed a four-year sponsorship contract with telecommunications company Vodafone, the competition is officially known as Vodafone OB I.

== Current teams ==
Location of teams in 2022-23 Országos Bajnokság I

The following 14 clubs compete in the OB I during the 2022–23 season:

| Team | Home city | Pool | Colours |
|---|---|---|---|
| BVSC | Budapest (XIV. ker) | Szőnyi úti Uszoda | |
| Eger | Eger | Bitskey Aladár Uszoda | |
| Ferencváros | Budapest (IX. ker) | FTC uszoda, Népliget | |
| Bp. Honvéd | Budapest (XIX. ker) | Kőér utcai Uszoda | |
| Kaposvár | Kaposvár | Csík Ferenc Sportuszoda | |
| KSI | Budapest | Széchy Tamás Uszoda | |
| Miskolc | Miskolc | Kemény Dénes Sportuszoda | |
| OSC | Budapest (XI. ker) | Nyéki Imre Uszoda | |
| PVSK | Pécs | Abay Nemes Oszkár Sportuszoda | |
| Szeged | Szeged | Tiszavirág Sportuszoda | |
| Szentes | Szentes | Dr. Rébeli Szabó József Sportuszoda | |
| Szolnok | Szolnok | Tiszaligeti Uszoda | |
| UVSE | Budapest (IV. ker) | Komjádi Béla Sportuszoda | |
| Vasas | Budapest (XIII. ker) | Komjádi Béla Sportuszoda | |

== Previous winners ==
- 1904: Balaton
- 1905: Balaton (2)
- 1906: Magyar Úszó Egylet
- 1907: Magyar Úszó Egylet (2)
- 1908: Magyar Úszó Egylet (3)
- 1909: Magyar Úszó Egylet (4)
- 1910: Ferencváros
- 1911: Ferencváros (2)
- 1912: Ferencváros (3)
- 1913: Ferencváros (4)
- 1914-16 – Not held due to WW I
- 1917: MAFC
- 1918: Ferencváros (5)
- 1919: Ferencváros (6)
- 1920: Ferencváros (7)
- 1921: Ferencváros (8)
- 1922: Ferencváros (9)
- 1923: III. Kerület
- 1924: III. Kerület (2)
- 1925: Ferencváros (10)
- 1926: Ferencváros (11)
- 1927: Ferencváros (12)
- 1928: III. Kerület (3)
- 1929: MAC
- 1930: Újpest
- 1931: Újpest (2)
- 1932: Újpest (3)
- 1933: Újpest (4)
- 1934: Újpest (5)
- 1935: Újpest (6)
- 1936: Újpest (7)
- 1937: Újpest (8)
- 1938: Újpest (9)
- 1939: Újpest (10)
- 1940: BSE
- 1941: Újpest (11)
- 1942: Újpest (12)
- 1943: MAC (2)
- 1944: Ferencváros (13)
- 1945: Újpest (13)
- 1946: Újpest (14)
- 1947: Vasas
- 1948: Újpest (15)
- 1949: Vasas (2)
- 1950: Újpest (16)
- 1951: Újpest (17)
- 1952: Újpest (18)
- 1953: Vasas (3)
- 1954: Szolnok
- 1955: Újpest (19)
- 1956: Ferencváros (14)
- 1957: Szolnok (2)
- 1958: Szolnok (3)
- 1959: Szolnok (4)
- 1960: Újpest (20)
- 1961: Szolnok (5)
- 1962: Ferencváros (15)
- 1963: Ferencváros (16)
- 1964: Szolnok (6)
- 1965: Ferencváros (17)
- 1966: BVSC
- 1967: Újpest (21)
- 1968: Ferencváros (18)
- 1969: OSC
- 1970: OSC (2)
- 1971: OSC (3)
- 1972: OSC (4)
- 1973: OSC (5)
- 1974: OSC (6)
- 1975: Vasas (4)
- 1976: Vasas (5)
- 1977: Vasas (6)
- 1978: OSC (7)
- 1979: Vasas (7)
- 1980: Vasas (8)
- 1981: Vasas (9)
- 1982: Vasas (10)
- 1983: Vasas (11)
- 1984: Vasas (12)
- 1984/85: BVSC (2)
- 1985/86: Újpest (22)
- 1986/87: BVSC (3)
- 1987/88: Ferencváros (19)
- 1988/89: Vasas (13)
- 1989/90: Ferencváros (20)
- 1990/91: Újpest (23)
- 1991/92: Tungsram
- 1992/93: Újpest (24)
- 1993/94: Újpest (25)
- 1994/95: Újpest (26)
- 1995/96: BVSC (4)
- 1996/97: BVSC (5)
- 1997/98: BVSC (6)
- 1998/99: BVSC (7)
- 1999/00: Ferencváros (21)
- 2000/01: Bp. Honvéd
- 2001/02: Bp. Honvéd (2)
- 2002/03: Bp. Honvéd (3)
- 2003/04: Bp. Honvéd (4)
- 2004/05: Bp. Honvéd (5)
- 2005/06: Bp. Honvéd (6)
- 2006/07: Vasas (14)
- 2007/08: Vasas (15)
- 2008/09: Vasas (16)
- 2009/10: Vasas (17)
- 2010/11: Eger
- 2011/12: Vasas (18)
- 2012/13: Eger (2)
- 2013/14: Eger (3)
- 2014/15: Szolnok (7)
- 2015/16: Szolnok (8)
- 2016/17: Szolnok (9)
- 2017/18: Ferencváros (22)
- 2018/19: Ferencváros (23)
- 2019/20 – Canceled due to COVID-19 pandemic
- 2020/21: Szolnok (10)
- 2021/22: Ferencváros (24)
- 2022/23: Ferencváros (25)
- 2023/24: Ferencváros (26)
- 2024/25: Ferencváros (27)
- 2025/26: Ferencváros (28)

=== Notes ===
- 1914–16: Cancelled due to war.
- 2019–20: Canceled due to COVID-19 pandemic.

=== Name changes ===
- Budapesti Honvéd SE (Bp. Honvéd): 1949 Budapesti Honvéd SE, 1999 Honvéd-Spartacus, 2000 Honvéd Domino, 2001 Domino-BHSE, 2007 Domino-Honvéd, 2010 Grupama Honvéd, 2013 Racionet Honvéd, 2018 Bp. Honvéd
- Ferencvárosi TC (FTC): (1904 Ferencvárosi TC, 1950 EDOSZ, 1951 Bp. Kinizsi, 1957 Ferencváros, 1989 FTC-Törley, 1993 Ferencváros, 1994 FTC-Vitasport, 1996 FTC-Vitalin, 1999 FTC-Thomas Jeans, 2000 FTC-Mirato, 2001 FTC-VMAX, 2003 Jégcsillag-FTC, 2004 Betonút-FTC, 2006 FTC-Aprilia, 2008 FTC-Fisher Klíma, 2012 Széchenyi Bank-FTC, 2014 Ferencváros, 2015 FTC-PQS Waterpolo, 2018 FTC-Telekom Waterpolo)
- Újpesti TE (UTE): 1891 Újpesti TE, 1950 Bp. Dózsa, 1957 Újpesti Dózsa, 1990 Újpest, 1993 UTE-Primavera, 1994 UTE-Office & Home, 1998 UTE-Taxi2000, 1999 UTE-Santal-Taxi2000, 2000 UTE-Humet, 2002 UTE-Taxi2000, 2004 UTE-VB Leasing, 2006 UTE-Óbuda-Újlak, 2007 Uniqa-UTE, 2010 Újpest)

== Performances ==
=== By club ===
| Club | Winners | Runners-up | Third place | Winning years |
|---|---|---|---|---|
| **Ferencváros** | **28** | 13 | 21 | 1910, 1911, 1912, 1913, 1918, 1919, 1920, 1921, 1922, 1925, 1927, 1944, 1953, 1956, 1962, 1963, 1965, 1968, 1988, 1990, 2000, 2018, 2019, 2022, 2023, 2024, 2025, 2026 |
| Újpest | **26** | 16 | 7 | 1930, 1931, 1932, 1933, 1934, 1935, 1936, 1937, 1938, 1939, 1941, 1942, 1945, 1946, 1948, 1950, 1951, 1952, 1955, 1960, 1967, 1986, 1991, 1993, 1994, 1995 |
| **Vasas** | **18** | 20 | 5 | 1947, 1949, 1953, 1975, 1976, 1977, 1979, 1980, 1981, 1982, 1983, 1984, 1989, 2007, 2008, 2009, 2010, 2012 |
| **Szolnok** | **10** | 6 | 6 | 1954, 1957, 1958, 1959, 1961, 1964, 2015, 2016, 2017, 2021 |
| **BVSC** | **7** | 9 | 8 | 1966, 1985, 1987, 1996, 1997, 1998, 1999 |
| **OSC** | **7** | 7 | 5 | 1969, 1970, 1971, 1972, 1973, 1974, 1978 |
| **Bp. Honvéd** | **6** | 3 | 11 | 2001, 2002, 2003, 2004, 2005, 2006 |
| Magyar Úszó Egylet | **4** | 1 | 1 | 1906, 1907, 1908, 1909 |
| III. Kerületi TVE | **3** | 9 | 5 | 1923, 1924, 1928 |
| **Eger** | **3** | 6 | 6 | 2011, 2013, 2014 |
| Magyar AC | **2** | 6 | 9 | 1929, 1943 |
| Balaton | **2** | 1 | - | 1904, 1905 |
| MAFC | **1** | 4 | - | 1917 |
| BSE | **1** | 2 | 1 | 1940 |
| Tungsram | **1** | 1 | 1 | 1992 |
| MTK Budapest | - | 6 | 9 | - |
| Postatakarékpénztár | - | 1 | - | - |
| Óbudai TE | - | 1 | - | - |
| Vörös Meteor | - | 1 | - | - |
| **Szentes** | - | 1 | - | - |
| **Szeged** | - | - | 7 | - |
| Budafok-Kistétény | - | - | 1 | - |
| Nemzeti SC | - | - | 1 | - |
| Bp. Spartacus | - | - | 1 | - |

- The bolded teams are currently playing in the 2021-22 season of the Hungarian League.

== Most seasons ==
The number of seasons that each team (in alphabetical order) has played in the top division from 1904 until 2021–22. A total of 61 teams had competed in at least one season at the top division. Ferencváros is the only teams to have played in the top division in every season since the league's inception in its modern form.

- 111: **Ferencváros**
- 87: Újpest
- 85: **Eger**
- 74: **Vasas**
- 71: **BVSC**, **Szolnok**
- 61: **Bp. Honvéd**
- 56: **OSC**
- 52: **Szentes**
- 44: **Szeged**
- 42: Bp. Spartacus
- 38: Tungsram
- 36: MTK Budapest
- 31: Tatabánya
- 24: III. Kerületi TVE
- 23: MAC
- 20: Nemzeti SC
- 18: MAFC, KSI
- 17: Magyar Úszó Egylet
- 16: Csepel, **Pécsi VSK**
- 12: Szegedi Úszó Egylet
- 11: BEAC, **Debrecen**
- 10: **Kaposvár**
- 9: BSE
- 8: BKV Előre, Bp. Vörös Meteor, **UVSE**
- 7: **Miskolc**
- 5: Hódmezővásárhely, Kecskemét
- 3: Balatoni Úszó Egylet, Óbuda TE, Vívó és Atlétikai Club, Volán, Cegléd, Neptun VSC, AVUS
- 2: Gamma SE, BBTE, Erzsébeti TC, Marosvásárhelyi SE, Tipográfia NyTE, Szegedi MTE, Szegedi Dózsa, Szent István University, Fehérvár Póló SE
- 1: Postatakarékpénztár, Szegedi VSE, Közalkalmazottak SE, Angyalföldi Sportiskola DSE, Eszterházy Károly University, YBL Waterpolo Club

The teams in Bold participate in the 2021–22 OB I.

== Format ==
As we can see from the chart the number of teams in the Hungarian First Division changed a lot and continuously. The league started in 1904 with four teams and with the formation of teams the league expanded continuously. Currently, there are 14 teams in the first division.

| Season | Number of teams |
|---|---|
| from 1904 to 1905 | 4 teams |
| in 1906 | 2 teams |
| from 1907 to 1908 | 1 team |
| from 1909 to 1918 | 2 teams |
| from 1919 to 1920 | 4 teams |
| from 1921 to 1922 | 5 teams |
| in 1923 | 6 teams |
| from 1924 to 1925 | 7 teams |
| in 1926 | 6 teams |
| from 1927 to 1928 | 7 teams |
| from 1929 to 1933 | 9 teams |
| from 1934 to 1936 | 8 teams |
| from 1937 to 1938 | 9 teams |
| from 1939 to 1942 | 10 teams |
| from 1943 to 1944 | 11 teams |
| in 1945 | 8 teams |
| in 1946 | 11 teams |
| in 1947 | 12 teams |
| from 1948 to 1953 | 10 teams |
| in 1954 | 12 teams |
| from 1955 to 1959 | 10 teams |
| from 1960 to 1961 | 12 teams |
| from 1962 to 1973 | 10 teams |
| from 1974 to 1979 | 12 teams |
| from 1980 to 1988–89 | 14 teams |
| from 1996-97 to 1998–99 | 12 teams |
| in 1999–00 | 10 teams |
| in 2000–01 | 12 teams |
| in 2001–02 | 13 teams |
| from 2002-03 to 2008–09 | 12 teams |
| in 2009–10 | 11 teams |
| in 2010–11 | 13 teams |
| in 2011–12 | 12 teams |
| from 2012–13 to 2014–15 | 14 teams |
| from 2015–16 to 2020–21 | 16 teams |
| from 2021–22 to present | 14 teams |

== Hungarian clubs in European competitions ==
| | Champions League | | | | Euro Cup | | | | Cup Winners' Cup (defunct) | | | |
| | C | Winning year(s) | RU | SF | C | Winning year(s) | RU | SF | C | Winning year(s) | RU | SF |
|---|---|---|---|---|---|---|---|---|---|---|---|---|
| Ferencváros | 3 | 2019, 2024, 2025 | 1 | 2 | 2 | 2017, 2018 | 2 | 1 | 4 | 1975, 1978, 1980, 1998 | 1 | |
| Orvosegyetem | 2 | 1973, 1979 | 2 | 1 | 0 | | 1 | 0 | 0 | | 1 | |
| Vasas | 2 | 1980, 1985 | 1 | 6 | 1 | 2023 | 0 | 3 | 3 | 1986, 1995, 2002 | 1 | |
| Honvéd | 1 | 2004 | 3 | 0 | 0 | | 0 | 1 | 0 | | 1 | |
| Újpest | 1 | 1994 | 2 | 1 | 3 | 1993, 1997, 1999 | 0 | 0 | 0 | | 0 | |
| Szolnok | 1 | 2017 | 0 | 1 | 1 | 2021 | 0 | 1 | 0 | | 0 | 0 |
| Budapesti VSC | 0 | | 1 | 1 | 0 | | 0 | 2 | 0 | | 2 | |
| Szeged | 0 | | 0 | 0 | 1 | 2009 | 1 | 2 | 0 | | 0 | 0 |
| Eger | 0 | | 0 | 1 | 0 | | 1 | 0 | 0 | | 0 | 0 |
| Debrecen | 0 | | 0 | 0 | 0 | | 0 | 1 | 0 | | 0 | 0 |
| Bp. Spartacus | 0 | | 0 | 0 | 0 | | 0 | 0 | 0 | | 1 | |
| TOTAL | 10 title | | 10 | 11 | 7 title | | 5 | 10 | 7 title | | 7 | |

== See also ==
- Magyar Kupa (National Cup of Hungary)
- Hungary men's national water polo team
