= 1965 Országos Bajnokság I (men's water polo) =

Water polo league season

OB I
- Season: 1965
- Champions: Ferencváros

1965 Országos Bajnokság I (men's water polo) was the 59th water polo championship in Hungary. There were ten teams who played two-round match for the title.

== Final list ==
#	Team	M	W	D	L	G+	G−	P
1.	Ferencvárosi TC	18	12	6	0	69	45	36
2.	Újpesti Dózsa	18	11	4	3	64	56	26
3.	Bp. Honvéd	18	7	9	2	72	54	23
4.	Szolnoki Dózsa	18	8	4	6	61	53	20
5.	Csepel Autó	18	7	6	5	59	59	20
6.	BVSC	18	3	11	4	43	48	17
7.	Egri Dózsa	18	5	6	7	70	74	16
8.	Vasas Izzó	18	4	3	11	44	57	11
9.	OSC	18	1	7	10	52	66	9
10.	Bp. Spartacus	18	2	4	12	47	69	8

* M: Matches W: Win D: Drawn L: Lost G+: Goals earned G−: Goals got P: Point

OB I 1965
Champions

Ferencváros
17th Title

== Sources ==
- Gyarmati Dezső: Aranykor (Hérodotosz Könyvkiadó és Értékesítő Bt., Budapest, 2002.)
