= 2020–21 Országos Bajnokság I (men's water polo) =

Water polo season

E.ON Férfi OB I Bajnokság^{1}
- Season: 2020–21
- Duration: August 29, 2020 – May 1, 2021 (Regular season)
- Teams: 16
- TV partner: M4 Sport

Statistical leaders
- Points: Mátyás Pásztor(90 goals)

Records
- Biggest home win: OSC 25–6 Szentes (4 November 2020)
- Biggest away win: Debrecen 1–19 OSC (27 October 2020)
- Winning streak: 16 games Szolnok
- Losing streak: 14 games Tatabánya
- All statistics correct as of March 31, 2021.^{1} Sponsored league name, referring to E.ON.

The 2020–21 Országos Bajnokság I (also known as the E.ON Férfi OB I Bajnokság for sponsorship reasons, OB I in short), is going to be the 115th season of top-tier water polo in Hungary.

== Team information ==
Location of teams in 2020-21 Országos Bajnokság I
Budapest OB I waterpolo teams

The following 16 clubs compete in the OB I during the 2020–21 season:

Team	Home city	Pool	Colours
BVSC	Budapest (XIV. ker)	Szőnyi úti Uszoda	
Debrecen	Debrecen	Debreceni Sportuszoda	
Eger	Eger	Bitskey Aladár Uszoda	
FTC	Budapest (IX. ker)	FTC uszoda, Népliget	
Honvéd	Budapest (XIX. ker)	Kőér utcai Uszoda	
Kaposvár	Kaposvár	Csík Ferenc Sportuszoda	
KSI	Budapest	Széchy Tamás Uszoda	
Miskolc	Miskolc	Kemény Dénes Sportuszoda	
OSC	Budapest (XI. ker)	Nyéki Imre Uszoda	
PVSK	Pécs	Abay Nemes Oszkár Sportuszoda	
Szeged	Szeged	Tiszavirág Sportuszoda	
Szentes	Szentes	Dr. Rébeli Szabó József Sportuszoda	
Szolnok	Szolnok	Tiszaligeti Uszoda	
Tatabánya	Tatabánya	Tatabányai Sportuszoda	
UVSE	Budapest (IV. ker)	Komjádi Béla Sportuszoda	
Vasas	Budapest (XIII. ker)	Komjádi Béla Sportuszoda	

=== Personnel and sponsors ===
Team	Head coach	Captain	Cap manufacturer	Cap sponsors
BVSC	(Hungary) Kristóf Kemény	(Hungary) Mátyás Pásztor	Diapolo	MKB-Euroleasing
Debrecen	(Serbia) Miroslav Bajin	(Hungary) Máté Süveges	Diapolo	none
Eger	(Hungary) Márton Petrovai	(Hungary) Máté Sántavy	Diapolo	Tigra, ZF
FTC	(Hungary) Zsolt Varga	(Hungary) Dénes Varga	Diapolo	Telekom, MVM
Honvéd	(Hungary) Márton Szívós		Arena	none
Kaposvár	(Hungary) László Surányi	(Hungary) Ferenc Vindisch	Seles	none
KSI	(Hungary) Dániel Horváth		Diapolo	none
Miskolc	(Hungary) István Kis	(Slovakia) Lukáš Seman	Diapolo	PannErgy
OSC	(Hungary) Dániel Varga	(Hungary) Balázs Erdélyi	Diapolo	MOL
PVSK	(Hungary) Viktor Török		Diapolo	none
Szeged	(Hungary) Zoltán Szabó	(Hungary) Csaba Kiss	Diapolo	none
Szentes	(Hungary) Csaba Pellei	(Hungary) Balázs Somogyi	Yordo	metALCOM
Szolnok	(Serbia) Živko Gocić	(Hungary) Dániel Angyal	Arena	none
Tatabánya	(Hungary) Tamás Zantleitner	(Hungary) Márton Keresztúri	Arena	none
UVSE	(Hungary) Balázs Vincze	(Hungary) Balázs Korényi	Diapolo	none
Vasas	(Hungary) Lajos Vad	(Hungary) Bence Bátori	Diapolo	A-Híd, Plaket

== Regular season ==
=== Standings ===
Pos	Team	Pld	W	D	L	GF	GA	GD	Pts	Qualification or relegation
1	Szolnoki Dózsa	30	27	2	1	470	239	+231	83	Qualification for the Play-off round
2	OSC Újbuda	30	25	3	2	437	229	+208	78 (Note: OSC are ranked ahead of Ferencváros on head-to-head points: OSC 9–7 Ferencváros, Ferencváros 12–16 OSC.)	Qualification for the Play-off round
3	FTC-Telekom Waterpolo	30	26	0	4	441	233	+208	78	Qualification for the Play-off round
4	BVSC-Zugló MKB-Euroleasing	30	23	2	5	431	264	+167	71	Qualification for the Play-off round
5	A-HÍD VasasPlaket	30	22	1	7	342	215	+127	67	
6	Budapesti Honvéd SE	30	15	3	12	322	302	+20	48	
7	UVSE Hunguest Hotels	30	13	5	12	283	318	−35	44	
8	Tigra-ZF-Eger	30	13	4	13	303	328	−25	43	
9	PannErgy-MVLC Miskolc	30	11	5	14	288	325	−37	38	
10	PVSK Mecsek Füszért	30	9	5	16	279	333	−54	32 (Note: PVSK are ahead of Szentes on head-to-head goal difference: PVSK 10–6 Szentes, Szentes 6–5 PVSK.)	
11	Metalcom Szentes	30	10	2	18	252	367	−115	32	
12	Kaposvári VK	30	10	1	19	290	393	−103	31	
13	Szegedi VE	30	7	3	20	256	337	−81	24	
14	Debrecen	30	4	1	25	239	415	−176	13	Qualification for the relegation play-offs
15	Tatabányai VSE	30	3	1	26	213	403	−190	10	Relegation to the Országos Bajnokság I/B
16	KSI SE	30	2	2	26	281	426	−145	8	Relegation to the Országos Bajnokság I/B

Updated to match(es) played on 14 March 2021. Source: Hungarian Water Polo Federation (in Hungarian), FlashScore
Rules for classification: 1) Points; 2) Head-to-head points; 3) Head-to-head goal difference; 4) Goal difference according to the overall result; 5) Goals scored; 6) Draw (Note: Head-to-head record is used only after all the matches between the teams in question have been played)

=== Schedule and results ===
In the table below the home teams are listed on the left and the away teams along the top.

Home \ Away	BVSC	DVSE	EGER	FTC	BHSE	KAP	KSI	MIS	OSC	PVSK	SZEG	SZEN	SZOL	TVSE	UVSE	VAS
BVSC	—	18–8	7–3	11–10	13–9	18–7	19–6	21–12	11–12	13–8	19–9	23–11	8–8	21–7	21–8	10–7
Debrecen	13–20	—	10–15	6–14	10–15	11–13	13–12	8–12	1–19	7–12	9–9	10–9	7–15	7–10	4–8	1–19
Eger	6–11	17–10	—	14–16	13–17	9–4	14–13	10–10	11–16	18–11	10–9	5–3	12–19	14–4	9–13	6–8
FTC	13–9	23–7	16–8	—	13–5	13–9	17–9	18–10	12–16	15–4	16–6	18–9	14–15	23–7	14–8	18–8
Bp. Honvéd	10–18	12–9	11–8	7–12	—	15–6	17–8	9–10	5–11	7–12	20–2	11–9	6–15	15–6	8–9	7–6
Kaposvár	12–19	14–13	10–15	8–17	7–18	—	16–15	17–10	6–15	13–11	14–12	14–15	7–18	10–9	11–12	9–10
KSI	10–20	11–12	10–13	7–17	12–15	9–10	—	0–5 (Note: The KSI v Miskolc match was awarded as a 5–0 win to Miskolc.)	5–17	9–9	8–10	9–13	5–15	14–12	11–11	9–15
Miskolc	8–11	16–10	9–9	4–17	6–7	13–12	15–10	—	8–15	12–9	8–8	11–11	10–11	14–5	11–11	3–9
OSC	10–9	18–9	14–5	9–7	10–10	10–5	21–8	16–6	—	14–6	19–10	25–6	15–15	17–6	14–10	8–8
PVSK	12–12	16–5	8–9	5–14	9–9	16–9	18–13	10–9	6–12	—	9–7	10–6	11–22	11–10	7–9	10–16
Szeged	5–8	10–6	11–12	8–9	8–9	8–9	15–10	6–17	7–15	8–8	—	11–5	6–16	11–9	13–10	7–9
Szentes	6–13	9–10	7–7	6–21	13–9	9–8	11–9	9–14	6–20	6–5	6–5	—	4–15	16–10	9–7	7–16
Szolnok	13–12	18–5	23–6	7–11	18–8	16–8	17–9	19–4	10–7	18–7	13–5	16–9	—	17–5	14–8	17–8
Tatabánya	4–18	6–4	9–9	3–10	7–13	6–7	9–11	8–14	3–18	9–8	10–14	10–11	5–20	—	9–13	1–9
UVSE	10–13	13–9	8–11	3–15	10–10	9–9	15–10	7–3	7–16	8–8	15–8	9–8	8–19	11–8	—	9–7
Vasas	7–5	12–5	11–5	5–8	12–8	22–6	15–9	12–4	11–8	14–3	9–8	16–3	9–11	23–6	9–4	—

Updated to match(es) played on 2 April 2021. Source: Hungarian Water Polo Federation (in Hungarian), FlashScore
Legend: Blue = home team win; Yellow = draw; Red = away team win.
For upcoming matches, an "a" indicates there is an article about the rivalry between the two participants.

== Play-off ==
=== Semi-finals ===
Team 1	Points	Team 2	Regular season		Game 1	Game 2	Game 3
Szolnoki Dózsa (1)	7–1	(4) BVSC-Zugló MKB-Euroleasing	13−12	8−8	11−7	／	
OSC Újbuda (2)	6–3	(3) FTC-Telekom Waterpolo	9−7	16−12	2-7	−	

=== Matches ===
5 May 2021; 18:00	Report	Szolnoki Dózsa	11–7	BVSC-Zugló MKB-Euroleasing	Tiszaligeti uszoda, Szolnok; Referees: Tóth, ifj. Kenéz
5 May 2021; 18:00	Report	Score by quarters: 2–2, 4–1, 4–2, 1–2			Tiszaligeti uszoda, Szolnok; Referees: Tóth, ifj. Kenéz
5 May 2021; 18:00	Report	three players 2	Goals	Pásztor 3	Tiszaligeti uszoda, Szolnok; Referees: Tóth, ifj. Kenéz

Szolnoki Dózsa won the series 7–1 with points ratio, and advanced to the Finals.

5 May 2021; 19:30	Report	OSC Újbuda	2–7	FTC-Telekom Waterpolo	Nyéki Imre uszoda, Budapest; Referees: Kun, Marjay
5 May 2021; 19:30	Report	Score by quarters: 0–2, 1–3, 0–1, 1–1			Nyéki Imre uszoda, Budapest; Referees: Kun, Marjay
5 May 2021; 19:30	Report	Hárai, Salamon 1	Goals	Varga 2	Nyéki Imre uszoda, Budapest; Referees: Kun, Marjay
