= 2022–23 Országos Bajnokság I (men's water polo) =

Water polo season

E.ON Férfi OB I Bajnokság^{1}
- Season: 2022–23
- Duration: October 8, 2022 – March 26, 2022 (Regular season)
- Teams: 14
- TV partner(s): M4 Sport

Regular season
- Top seed: FTC Telekom
- Promoted: KSI

Finals
- Champions: FTC Telekom (25th title)
- Runners-up: Genesys OSC-Újbuda
- Third place: Endo Plus Service-Honvéd
- Fourth place: A-Híd VasasPlaket
- ^{1} Sponsored league name, referring to E.ON.

The 2022–23 Országos Bajnokság I (also known as the E.ON Férfi OB I Bajnokság for sponsorship reasons, OB I in short), is going to be the 117th season of top-tier water polo in Hungary. A total of fourteen teams contest this season's league, which began on 8 October 2022 and will conclude on 18 May 2023.

FTC-Telekom won their twenty-fifth title.

== Teams ==
Location of teams in '2022–23 Országos Bajnokság I
Budapest OB I waterpolo teams

The following 14 clubs compete in the OB I during the 2022–23 season:

Team	Home city	Pool	Colours	2021–22
BVSC	Budapest (XIV. ker)	Szőnyi úti Uszoda		6th
Eger	Eger	Bitskey Aladár Uszoda		10th
Ferencváros	Budapest (IX. ker)	FTC uszoda, Népliget; Komjádi Béla Sportuszoda		1st
Honvéd	Budapest (XIX. ker)	Kőér utcai Uszoda		5th
Kaposvár	Kaposvár	Csík Ferenc Sportuszoda		9th
KSI	Budapest	Komjádi Béla Sportuszoda		1st (OB I/B)
Miskolc	Miskolc	Kemény Dénes Sportuszoda		11th
OSC	Budapest (XI. ker)	Nyéki Imre Uszoda		2nd
PVSK	Pécs	Abay Nemes Oszkár Sportuszoda		8th
Szeged	Szeged	Tiszavirág Sportuszoda		7th
Szentes	Szentes	Dr. Rébeli Szabó József Sportuszoda		13th
Szolnok	Szolnok	Vízilabda Aréna		4th
UVSE	Budapest	Komjádi Béla Sportuszoda		12th
Vasas	Budapest (XIII. ker)	Komjádi Béla Sportuszoda		3rd

== Final standings ==
Qualified for the 2023–24 LEN Champions League
Qualified for the 2023–24 LEN Euro Cup
Relegated to Országos Bajnokság I/B

Rank	Team
1st place, gold medalist(s)	FTC Telekom (C)
2nd place, silver medalist(s)	Genesys OSC-Újbuda
3rd place, bronze medalist(s)	Endo Plus Service-Honvéd
4	A-Híd VasasPlaket
5	BVSC-Zugló
6	Szolnoki Dózsa
7	Tigra-ZF-Eger
8	PannErgy-MVLC Miskolc
9	Szegedi VE
10	UVSE
11	PVSK-Mecsek Füszért
12	Kaposvári VK
13	Metalcom Szentes
14	KSI

Sources: MVLSZ
(C) Champion; (O) Play-off winner; (R) Relegated

2022–23 Országos Bajnokság I
Champion
FTC Telekom
25th title

Roster
Luca Damonte, Szabolcs Dubinák, Gergő Fekete, Lőrinc Gábor, Sándor Gál, Szilárd Jansik, Gergely Klár, Daniil Merkulov, Erik Molnár, Toni Német, Balázs Nyíri, Zoltán Pohl, Márk Spitz, Dániel Szakonyi, Nemanja Ubović, Dénes Varga (c), Vincze Varga, Márton Vámos, Vendel Vigvári
Head coach
Zsolt Varga

== See also ==
- 2022 Magyar Kupa
