= 2017–18 Országos Bajnokság I (men's water polo) =

Water polo league season

e·on férfi OB I
- Season: 2017–18
- Champions: FTC-PQS Waterpolo (22nd title)
- Relegated: ContiTech Szeged
- Champions League: FTC-PQS Waterpolo; Szolnoki Dózsa; ZF-Eger
- Euro Cup: A-HÍD OSC Újbuda; MKB Euroleasing-BVSC-Zugló
- Top goalscorer: Alex Bowen (66 goals)

The 2017–18 Országos Bajnokság I (known as the e·on férfi OB I osztályú Országos Bajnokság for sponsorship reasons) was the 112th season of the Országos Bajnokság I, Hungary's premier Water polo league.

== Teams ==
Location of teams in 2017-18 Országos Bajnokság I
Budapest OB I waterpolo teams

The following 16 clubs compete in the OB I during the 2017–18 season:

OB I
Team	City	Pool	Founded	Colours
AVUS	Szombathely	Szombathelyi Városi Uszoda	2010	
BVSC	Budapest (XIV. ker)	Szőnyi úti uszoda	1911	
Debrecen	Debrecen	Debreceni Sportuszoda	2006	
Eger	Eger	Bitskey Aladár uszoda	1910	
FTC	Budapest (IX. ker)	Népligeti uszoda	1899	
Honvéd	Budapest (XIX. ker)	Kőér utcai uszoda	1950	
Kaposvár	Kaposvár	Virágfürdő	1999	
Miskolc	Miskolc	Kemény Dénes Sportuszoda	2012	
OSC	Budapest (XI. ker)	Nyéki Imre uszoda	1957	
PVSK	Pécs	Abay Nemes Oszkár Sportuszoda	1997	
Szeged	Szeged	Szegedi Sportuszoda	1993	
Szentes	Szentes	Dr. Rébeli Szabó József Sportuszoda	1934	
Szolnok	Szolnok	Tiszaligeti uszoda	1921	
TVSE	Tatabánya	Tatabányai Sportuszoda	1992	
UVSE	Budapest (IV. ker)	Hajós Alfréd Sportuszoda	2008	
Vasas	Budapest (XIII. ker)	Komjádi Béla Sportuszoda	1945	

=== Head coaches ===
Team	Head coach
AVUS	(Hungary) Márk Matajsz
BVSC	(Hungary) Levente Szűcs
Debrecen	(Hungary) Péter Komlósi
Eger	(Hungary) Norbert Dabrowski
FTC	(Hungary) Zsolt Varga
Honvéd	(Hungary) Lajos Vad
Kaposvár	(Hungary) Zoltán Szécsi (until 16 October 2017) (Hungary) József Berta (from 21 October 2017)
MVLC	(Hungary) dr. József Sike
OSC	(Hungary) Attila Petik (until 3 February 2018) (Hungary) László Tóth (from 4 February 2018)
PVSK	(Hungary) Gergely Lukács
Szeged	(Hungary) Péter Varga
Szentes	(Hungary) Csaba Pellei
Szolnok	(Hungary) ifj. Sándor Cseh
Tatabánya	(Hungary) Tamás Zantleitner
UVSE	(Hungary) Zsolt Németh
Vasas	(Hungary) László Földi

== Regular season ==
=== Group A ===
Pos	Team	Pld	W	D	L	GF	GA	GD	Pts	Qualification
1	Szolnoki Dózsa	14	13	0	1	225	89	+136	39 (Note: SZOL - FTC: 11–13; FTC - SZOL: 8–11)	Qualification for the Championship round
2	FTC-PQS Waterpolo	14	13	0	1	234	91	+143	39	Qualification for the Championship round
3	MKB Euroleasing-BVSC-Zugló	14	8	1	5	146	123	+23	25	Qualification for the Championship round
4	Debreceni VSE	14	5	2	7	135	159	−24	17	Qualification for the Championship round
5	Kaposvári VK	14	5	1	8	105	157	−52	16	Qualification for the Relegation round
6	VasasPlaket	14	4	3	7	107	152	−45	15	Qualification for the Relegation round
7	AVUS Szombathely	14	3	0	11	114	192	−78	9	Qualification for the Relegation round
8	UVSE	14	1	1	12	86	189	−103	4	Qualification for the Relegation round

==== Schedule and results ====
In the table below the home teams are listed on the left and the away teams along the top.

Home \ Away	AVUS	BVSC	DVSE	FTC	KAP	SZOL	UVSE	VAS
AVUS Szombathely		7–14	11–13	8–21	10–8	3–23	9–4	10–12
BVSC-Zugló	10–8		10–11	3–13	10–6	9–10	14–8	9–8
Debreceni VSE	16–10	8–12		6–22	7–9	7–16	13–5	10–10
Ferencvárosi TC	18–5	10–7	15–9		23–6	8–11	19–7	18–3
Kaposvári VK	11–6	7–13	9–9	7–17		5–15	13–5	8–7
Szolnoki Dózsa	20–8	13–9	19–7	11–13	18–2		17–6	20–3
UVSE	9–11	8–20	4–13	4–20	7–11	1–13		10–10
Vasas SC	13–8	6–6	7–6	4–17	10–3	8–19	6–8	

Legend: Blue = home team win; Yellow = draw; Red = away team win.

=== Group B ===
Pos	Team	Pld	W	D	L	GF	GA	GD	Pts	Qualification
1	ZF-Eger	14	13	1	0	175	77	+98	40	Qualification for the Championship round
2	A-HÍD OSC Újbuda	14	11	0	3	153	83	+70	33	Qualification for the Championship round
3	PannErgy-Miskolci VLC	14	8	2	4	138	97	+41	26	Qualification for the Championship round
4	RacioNet Honvéd	14	7	2	5	125	117	+8	23	Qualification for the Championship round
5	PVSK-Mecsek Füszért	14	5	2	7	114	118	−4	17	Qualification for the Relegation round
6	Metalcom Szentes	14	4	1	9	105	141	−36	13	Qualification for the Relegation round
7	Tatabányai VSE	14	3	2	9	93	133	−40	11	Qualification for the Relegation round
8	ContiTech Szeged	14	0	0	14	60	197	−137	0	Qualification for the Relegation round

==== Schedule and results ====
In the table below the home teams are listed on the left and the away teams along the top.

Home \ Away	BHSE	EGER	MVLC	OSC	PVSK	SZEG	SZEN	TVSE
Bp. Honvéd SE		3–12	9–9	12–6	9–9	15–5	11–6	9–5
Egri VK	17–4		8–4	8–7	14–7	20–4	17–8	15–5
Miskolci VLC	11–6	8–8		7–10	10–6	18–2	12–5	13–9
Orvosegyetem SC	9–4	8–9	8–4		10–6	15–1	13–4	15–3
Pécsi VSK	9–5	5–12	8–9	6–13		11–5	8–3	6–4
Szegedi VE	3–20	4–16	5–18	4–13	4–14		5–9	5–7
Szentesi VK	8–9	4–6	7–12	10–14	11–10	12–7		8–8
Tatabányai VSE	8–9	6–13	6–3	5–12	9–9	9–6	9–10	

Legend: Blue = home team win; Yellow = draw; Red = away team win.

== Second round ==
=== Championship round ===
The top four teams, from two groups advance from the regular season. Teams start the Championship round with their points from the Regular season.

Pos	Team	Pld	W	D	L	GF	GA	GD	Pts	Qualification
1	FTC-PQS Waterpolo	22	21	0	1	331	148	+183	63	Qualification to 1st – 4th Placement matches
2	Szolnoki Dózsa	22	20	0	2	335	146	+189	60	Qualification to 1st – 4th Placement matches
3	ZF-Eger	22	18	1	3	268	155	+113	55	Qualification to 1st – 4th Placement matches
4	A-HÍD OSC Újbuda	22	15	0	7	220	157	+63	45	Qualification to 1st – 4th Placement matches
5	MKB Euroleasing-BVSC-Zugló	22	11	1	10	217	210	+7	34	Qualification to 5th – 8th Placement matches
6	PannErgy-Miskolci VLC	22	10	2	10	232	194	+38	32	Qualification to 5th – 8th Placement matches
7	RacioNet Honvéd	22	9	2	11	183	212	−29	29	Qualification to 5th – 8th Placement matches
8	Debreceni VSE	22	6	2	14	201	270	−69	20	Qualification to 5th – 8th Placement matches

==== Schedule and results ====
Key numbers for pairing determination (number marks position after 14 games)

Rounds
15th	16th	17th	18th	19th	20th	21st	22nd
A1 - B4; B1 - A4; A2 - B3; B2 - A3	A1 - B2; B1 - A2; B4 - A3; A4 - B3	B3 - A1; A3 - B1; A2 - B4; B2 - A4	A1 - B1; A2 - B2; B3 - A3; B4 - A4	B4 - A1; A4 - B1; B3 - A2; A3 - B2	B2 - A1; A2 - B1; A3 - B4; B3 - A4	A1 - B3; B1 - A3; B4 - A2; A4 - B2	B1 - A1; B2 - A2; A3 - B3; A4 - B4

In the table below the home teams are listed on the left and the away teams along the top.

Home \ Away	BHSE	BVSC	DVSE	EGER	FTC	MVLC	OSC	SZOL
Bp. Honvéd SE		10–9	12–3		7–17			3–16
BVSC-Zugló	10–7			7–13		11–10	7–11	
Debreceni VSE	12–9			10–16		10–21	9–10	
Egri VK		14–9	16–8		10–11			8–7
Ferencvárosi TC	14–3			10–9		14–10	12–5	
Miskolci VLC		11–12	15–10		7–9			8–16
Orvosegyetem SC		11–6	12–4		6–10			8–15
Szolnoki Dózsa	14–7			16–7		15–12	11–4	

Legend: Blue = home team win; Yellow = draw; Red = away team win.

=== Relegation round ===
The bottom four teams, from two groups advance from the regular season. Teams start the Relegation round with their points from the Regular season.

Pos	Team	Pld	W	D	L	GF	GA	GD	Pts	Qualification
9	PVSK-Mecsek Füszért	22	11	3	8	198	184	+14	36	Qualification to 9th – 12th Placement matches
10	Kaposvári VK	22	10	4	8	188	221	−33	34	Qualification to 9th – 12th Placement matches
11	VasasPlaket	22	9	4	9	184	209	−25	31	Qualification to 9th – 12th Placement matches
12	Metalcom Szentes	22	7	3	12	168	203	−35	24 (Note: SZEN - AVUS: 9–4; AVUS - SZEN: 11–6)	Qualification to 9th – 12th Placement matches
13	AVUS Szombathely	22	8	0	14	194	272	−78	24	Qualification to 13th – 16th Placement matches
14	Tatabányai VSE	22	5	3	14	165	211	−46	18	Qualification to 13th – 16th Placement matches
15	UVSE	22	3	1	18	148	258	−110	10	Qualification to 13th – 16th Placement matches
16	ContiTech Szeged	22	0	0	22	111	293	−182	0	Qualification to 13th – 16th Placement matches

==== Schedule and results ====
In the table below the home teams are listed on the left and the away teams along the top.

Home \ Away	AVUS	KAP	PVSK	SZEG	SZEN	TVSE	UVSE	VAS
AVUS Szombathely			6–14	13–11	11–6	15–14		
Kaposvári VK			11–9	11–5	9–9	13–8		
Pécsi VSK	11–9	5–5					13–6	8–7
Szegedi VE	8–13	11–15					7–11	5–10
Szentesi VK	9–4	7–9					9–7	10–10
Tatabányai VSE	7–9	10–10					9–6	8–9
UVSE			11–12	14–2	3–8	4–9		
Vasas SC			11–12	9–2	9–5	12–7		

Legend: Blue = home team win; Yellow = draw; Red = away team win.

== Final round ==
=== 1st – 4th placement matches ===
Semi-finals

Team 1	Points	Team 2	Games in the season		Game 1	Game 2	Game 3
FTC-PQS Waterpolo (1)	9–0	A-HÍD OSC Újbuda (4)	12-5	10-6	8-4	—	—
Szolnoki Dózsa (2)	9–6	ZF-Eger (3)	16-7	7-8	13-14 (p)	12-6	9-4

Game 1

25 April 2018; 19:30 (CEST)	Report	FTC-PQS Waterpolo	8–4	A-HÍD OSC Újbuda	Komjádi Béla Sportuszoda, Budapest; Referees: Molnár, Rubos
25 April 2018; 19:30 (CEST)	Report	Score by quarters: 3-1, 3-0, 0-2, 2-1			Komjádi Béla Sportuszoda, Budapest; Referees: Molnár, Rubos
25 April 2018; 19:30 (CEST)	Report	Vámos, Jakšić 2	Goals	Kovács, Burián 2	Komjádi Béla Sportuszoda, Budapest; Referees: Molnár, Rubos

FTC-PQS Waterpolo won the series 9–0 with points ratio, and advanced to the Finals.

25 April 2018; 16:00 (CEST)	Report	Szolnoki Dózsa	3–3 ^{(10–11 PSO)} (PSO)	ZF-Eger	Tiszaligeti uszoda, Szolnok; Referees: Petik, Dodog
25 April 2018; 16:00 (CEST)	Report	Score by quarters: 0-0, 1-0, 1-1, 1-2 PSO: 10–11			Tiszaligeti uszoda, Szolnok; Referees: Petik, Dodog
25 April 2018; 16:00 (CEST)	Report	Prlainović 4	Goals	Rašović 4	Tiszaligeti uszoda, Szolnok; Referees: Petik, Dodog

Game 2

2 May 2018; 19:00 (CEST)	Report	ZF-Eger	6–12	Szolnoki Dózsa	Bitskey Aladár uszoda, Eger; Referees: Székely, Németh
2 May 2018; 19:00 (CEST)	Report	Score by quarters: 1-3, 2-3, 3-3, 0-3			Bitskey Aladár uszoda, Eger; Referees: Székely, Németh
2 May 2018; 19:00 (CEST)	Report	Hosnyánszky, Rašović 2	Goals	Kis, Prlainović 3	Bitskey Aladár uszoda, Eger; Referees: Székely, Németh

Game 3

5 May 2018; 16:00 (CEST)	Report	Szolnoki Dózsa	9–4	ZF-Eger	Tiszaligeti uszoda, Szolnok; Referees: Rubos, Csanádi
5 May 2018; 16:00 (CEST)	Report	Score by quarters: 1-0, 3-2, 4-1, 1-1			Tiszaligeti uszoda, Szolnok; Referees: Rubos, Csanádi
5 May 2018; 16:00 (CEST)	Report	Kis, Prlainović 2	Goals	four players 1	Tiszaligeti uszoda, Szolnok; Referees: Rubos, Csanádi

Szolnoki Dózsa won the series 9–6 with points ratio, and advanced to the Finals.

==== Finals ====
Higher ranked team hosted Game 1 and Game 3 plus Game 5 if necessary. The lower ranked hosted Game 2 plus Game 4 if necessary.

Team 1	Agg.	Team 2	Game 1	Game 2	Game 3	Game 4	Game 5
FTC-PQS Waterpolo	3–2	Szolnoki Dózsa	12-9	14-9	6-14	7-8	8-7

13 May 2018; 17:45 (CEST)	Report	FTC-PQS Waterpolo	12–9	Szolnoki Dózsa	Komjádi Béla Sportuszoda, Budapest; Attendance: 1,600; Referees: dr. Marosvári, Csanádi
13 May 2018; 17:45 (CEST)	Report	Score by quarters: 2-3, 3-2, 4-2, 3-2			Komjádi Béla Sportuszoda, Budapest; Attendance: 1,600; Referees: dr. Marosvári, Csanádi
13 May 2018; 17:45 (CEST)	Report	Dé. Varga 4	Goals	Prlainović 3	Komjádi Béla Sportuszoda, Budapest; Attendance: 1,600; Referees: dr. Marosvári, Csanádi

16 May 2018; 19:00 (CEST)	Report	Szolnoki Dózsa	9–14	FTC-PQS Waterpolo	Tiszaligeti uszoda, Szolnok; Attendance: 1,100; Referees: Mucskai, Németh
16 May 2018; 19:00 (CEST)	Report	Score by quarters: 2-4, 3-4, 1-3, 3-3			Tiszaligeti uszoda, Szolnok; Attendance: 1,100; Referees: Mucskai, Németh
16 May 2018; 19:00 (CEST)	Report	Younger 3	Goals	Dé. Varga 4	Tiszaligeti uszoda, Szolnok; Attendance: 1,100; Referees: Mucskai, Németh

19 May 2018; 15:00 (CEST)	Report	FTC-PQS Waterpolo	6–14	Szolnoki Dózsa	Komjádi Béla Sportuszoda, Budapest; Attendance: 1,600; Referees: Molnár, Székely
19 May 2018; 15:00 (CEST)	Report	Score by quarters: 1-4, 2-3, 2-3, 1-4			Komjádi Béla Sportuszoda, Budapest; Attendance: 1,600; Referees: Molnár, Székely
19 May 2018; 15:00 (CEST)	Report	Vámos 3	Goals	Zalánki, Younger 4	Komjádi Béla Sportuszoda, Budapest; Attendance: 1,600; Referees: Molnár, Székely

23 May 2018; 18:15 (CEST)	Report	Szolnoki Dózsa	8–7	FTC-PQS Waterpolo	Tiszaligeti uszoda, Szolnok; Attendance: 1,100; Referees: Molnár, Németh
23 May 2018; 18:15 (CEST)	Report	Score by quarters: 2-0, 3-2, 2-3, 1-2			Tiszaligeti uszoda, Szolnok; Attendance: 1,100; Referees: Molnár, Németh
23 May 2018; 18:15 (CEST)	Report	Mezei 2	Goals	Vámos 3	Tiszaligeti uszoda, Szolnok; Attendance: 1,100; Referees: Molnár, Németh

26 May 2018; 17:00 (CEST)	Report	FTC-PQS Waterpolo	8–7	Szolnoki Dózsa	Komjádi Béla Sportuszoda, Budapest; Attendance: 1,600; Referees: Székely, Csanádi
26 May 2018; 17:00 (CEST)	Report	Score by quarters: 3-4, 3-2, 1-0, 1-1			Komjádi Béla Sportuszoda, Budapest; Attendance: 1,600; Referees: Székely, Csanádi
26 May 2018; 17:00 (CEST)	Report	Dá. Varga 3	Goals	Prlainović 2	Komjádi Béla Sportuszoda, Budapest; Attendance: 1,600; Referees: Székely, Csanádi

FTC-PQS Waterpolo won the Final series 3–2.

2017–18 Országos Bajnokság I
Champion

22nd title

==== Third place ====
Higher ranked team hosted Game 1 plus Game 3 if necessary. The lower ranked hosted Game 2.

Team 1	Agg.	Team 2	Game 1	Game 2	Game 3
ZF-Eger	2–0	A-HÍD OSC Újbuda	11-5	9-7	—

12 May 2018; 19:00 (CEST)	Report	ZF-Eger	11–5	A-HÍD OSC Újbuda	Bitskey Aladár uszoda, Eger; Referees: Petik, Rubos
12 May 2018; 19:00 (CEST)	Report	Score by quarters: 2-0, 3-3, 4-1, 2-1			Bitskey Aladár uszoda, Eger; Referees: Petik, Rubos
12 May 2018; 19:00 (CEST)	Report	Rašović 5	Goals	Burián 2	Bitskey Aladár uszoda, Eger; Referees: Petik, Rubos

16 May 2018; 18:00 (CEST)	Report	A-HÍD OSC Újbuda	7–9	ZF-Eger	Nyéki Imre uszoda, Budapest; Referees: Marnitz, Dodog
16 May 2018; 18:00 (CEST)	Report	Score by quarters: 1-3, 1-4, 1-2, 4-0			Nyéki Imre uszoda, Budapest; Referees: Marnitz, Dodog
16 May 2018; 18:00 (CEST)	Report	Brguljan 2	Goals	Rašović 4	Nyéki Imre uszoda, Budapest; Referees: Marnitz, Dodog

ZF-Eger won the Third place.

=== 5th – 8th Placement matches ===
Team 1	Points	Team 2	Games in the season		Game 1	Game 2	Game 3
MKB Euroleasing-BVSC-Zugló (5)	9–3	Debreceni VSE (8)	10-11	12-8	10-4	10-9	—
PannErgy-Miskolci VLC (6)	7–1	RacioNet Honvéd (7)	11-6	9-9	8-3	—	—

Fifth place game (European competition play-off)

Higher ranked team hosted Game 1 plus Game 3 if necessary. The lower ranked hosted Game 2.

Team 1	Agg.	Team 2	Game 1	Game 2	Game 3
MKB Euroleasing-BVSC-Zugló	2–1	PannErgy-Miskolci VLC	9-8	10-12	14-13 (p)

Seventh place game

Higher ranked team hosted Game 1 plus Game 3 if necessary. The lower ranked hosted Game 2.

Team 1	Agg.	Team 2	Game 1	Game 2	Game 3
RacioNet Honvéd	2–0	Debreceni VSE	10-9	13-12	—

=== 9th – 12th Placement matches ===
Team 1	Points	Team 2	Games in the season		Game 1	Game 2	Game 3
PVSK-Mecsek Füszért (9)	9–6	Metalcom Szentes (12)	8-3	10-11	11-6	2-16	7-5
Kaposvári VK (10)	9–6	VasasPlaket (11)	8-7	3-10	14-13	7-8	11-4

Ninth place game

Higher ranked team hosted Game 1 plus Game 3 if necessary. The lower ranked hosted Game 2.

Team 1	Agg.	Team 2	Game 1	Game 2	Game 3
PVSK-Mecsek Füszért	1–2	Kaposvári VK	13-9	7-6	6-10

Eleventh place game

Higher ranked team hosted Game 1 plus Game 3 if necessary. The lower ranked hosted Game 2.

Team 1	Agg.	Team 2	Game 1	Game 2	Game 3
VasasPlaket	1–2	Metalcom Szentes	8-7	3-11	9-10

=== 13th – 16th Placement matches ===
Team 1	Points	Team 2	Games in the season		Game 1	Game 2	Game 3
AVUS Szombathely (13)	9–0	ContiTech Szeged (16)	13-11	13-8	12-7	—	—
Tatabányai VSE (14)	9–0	UVSE (15)	9-6	9-4	7-6	—	—

Thirteenth place game

Higher ranked team hosted Game 1 plus Game 3 if necessary. The lower ranked hosted Game 2.

Team 1	Agg.	Team 2	Game 1	Game 2	Game 3
AVUS Szombathely	2–0	Tatabányai VSE	11-6	14-11	—

Fifteenth place game (Relegation play-out)

Higher ranked team hosted Game 1 plus Game 3 if necessary. The lower ranked hosted Game 2.

Team 1	Agg.	Team 2	Game 1	Game 2	Game 3
UVSE	2–0	ContiTech Szeged	11-5	13-6	—

== Season statistics ==
=== Top goalscorers ===
As of 27 May 2018.

Rank	Player	Team	Goals
1	(United States) Alex Bowen	MVLC	66
2	(Hungary) Márton Vámos	FTC	62
3	(Serbia) Strahinja Rašović	Eger	61
4	(Hungary) Dénes Varga	FTC	60
5	(Serbia) Andrija Prlainović	Szolnok	56
6	(Hungary) Gergő Zalánki	Szolnok	54
7	(Australia) Aaron Younger	Szolnok	52
8	(Greece) Angelos Vlachopoulos	Eger	49
9	(Hungary) Márton Nagy	Szentes	48
9	(Hungary) Mátyás Pásztor	BVSC	48

=== Points classification ===
As of 27 May 2018.

Rank	Player	Team	Rating
1	(Hungary) Márton Vámos	FTC	75.0
2	(United States) Alex Bowen	MVLC	68.4
3	(Serbia) Strahinja Rašović	Eger	68.3
4	(Hungary) Dénes Varga	FTC	64.2
5	(Montenegro) Saša Mišić	MVLC	64.0
6	(Greece) Angelos Vlachopoulos	Eger	63.9
7	(Hungary) Gergő Zalánki	Szolnok	61.3
8	(Hungary) Alex Csacsovszky	PVSK	60.2
9	(Hungary) Tamás Mezei	Szolnok	55.4
10	(Hungary) Gábor Kis	Szolnok	55.3

=== Top exclusions ===
As of 27 May 2018.

Rank	Player	Team	Fouls
1	(Serbia) Dimitrije Obradović	DVSE	57
2	(Hungary) Bálint Takács	Vasas	55
3	(Hungary) Zsombor Horváth	PVSK	53
3	(Hungary) Dávid Jansik	Szolnok	53
3	(Hungary) Szilárd Jansik	FTC	53
3	(Hungary) Kristóf Takács	AVUS	53
7	(Slovakia) (Hungary) Erik Bundschuch	OSC	52
7	(Hungary) Tibor Kókai	Szentes	52
9	(Hungary) Dávid Hőna	Vasas	50
9	(Hungary) Máté Sántavy	Kaposvár	50

=== Discipline ===
As of 16 May 2017.

- Most goals conceded (club): 23
  - Szolnoki Dózsa-KÖZGÉP vs. Debreceni VSE / Round 5, (Group A)
- Most goals conceded: 30
  - Szolnoki Dózsa-KÖZGÉP 23–7 Debreceni VSE / Round 5, (Group A)
- Fewest goals conceded (club): 3
  - KSI SE vs. Szentesi VK / Round 4, (Group A)
- Fewest goals conceded: 8
  - EBP Tatabánya 4–4 RacioNet Honvéd / Round 14, (Group B)
- Attendance:
  - Highest: 1,224 ZF-Eger vs. Szolnoki Dózsa-KÖZGÉP / Final (1,3)
  - Lowest: 50 KSI SE vs. Debreceni VSE and Szentesi VK

=== Number of teams by counties ===
Pos.	County (megye)	№ of teams	Teams
1	Budapest (capital)	6	BVSC, FTC, Honvéd, OSC, UVSE and Vasas
2	Csongrád	2	Szegedi VE and Szentesi VK
3	Baranya	1	Pécsi VSK
3	Borsod-Abaúj-Zemplén	1	Miskolci VLC
3	Hajdú-Bihar	1	Debreceni VSE
3	Heves	1	Egri VK
3	Jász-Nagykun-Szolnok	1	Szolnoki Dózsa
3	Komárom-Esztergom	1	Tatabányai VSE
3	Somogy	1	Kaposvári VK
3	Vas	1	AVUS Szombathely

== Final standing ==
Pos	Team	Qualification or Relegation
1st place, gold medalist(s)	FTC-PQS Waterpolo	Qualification to Champions League preliminary round
2nd place, silver medalist(s)	Szolnoki Dózsa	Qualification to Champions League second qualifying round
3rd place, bronze medalist(s)	ZF-Eger	Qualification to Champions League first qualifying round
4	A-HÍD OSC Újbuda	Qualification to Euro Cup first qualifying round
5	MKB Euroleasing-BVSC-Zugló	Qualification to Euro Cup first qualifying round
6	PannErgy-Miskolci VLC	
7	RacioNet Honvéd	
8	Debreceni VSE	
9	Kaposvári VK	
10	PVSK-Mecsek Füszért	
11	Metalcom Szentes	
12	VasasPlaket	
13	AVUS Szombathely	
14	Tatabányai VSE	
15	UVSE	
16	ContiTech Szeged	Relegation to Országos Bajnokság I/B

=== Awards ===
- Best Goalkeeper:
- Best Field player:

== See also ==
- 2017 Magyar Kupa (National Cup of Hungary)
- 2017 Szuperkupa (Super Cup of Hungary)
