= 2016–17 Országos Bajnokság I (men's water polo) =

Water polo league season

e·on férfi OB I
- Season: 2016–17
- Champions: Szolnoki Dózsa-KÖZGÉP (9th title)
- Relegated: KSI SE
- Champions League: Szolnoki Dózsa-KÖZGÉP; ZF-Eger; A-HÍD OSC Újbuda
- Euro Cup: FTC-PQS Waterpolo; PannErgy-Miskolci VLC
- Top goalscorer: Dénes Varga (87 goals)

The 2016–17 Országos Bajnokság I (known as the e·on férfi OB I osztályú Országos Bajnokság for sponsorship reasons) was the 111th season of the Országos Bajnokság I, Hungary's premier Water polo league.

== Team information ==
Location of teams in 2016-17 Országos Bajnokság I
Budapest OB I waterpolo teams

The following 16 clubs compete in the OB I during the 2016–17 season:

OB I
Team	City	Pool	Founded	Colours
BVSC	Budapest (XIV. ker)	Szőnyi úti uszoda	1911	
Debrecen	Debrecen	Debreceni Sportuszoda	2006	
Eger	Eger	Bitskey Aladár uszoda	1910	
FTC	Budapest (IX. ker)	Népligeti uszoda	1899	
Honvéd	Budapest (XIX. ker)	Kőér utcai uszoda	1950	
Kaposvár	Kaposvár	Virágfürdő	1999	
KSI	Budapest	Széchy Tamás uszoda	1963	
Miskolc	Miskolc	Kemény Dénes Sportuszoda	2012	
OSC	Budapest (XI. ker)	Nyéki Imre uszoda	1957	
PVSK	Pécs	Abay Nemes Oszkár Sportuszoda	1997	
Szeged	Szeged	Szegedi Sportuszoda	1993	
Szentes	Szentes	Dr. Rébeli Szabó József Sportuszoda	1934	
Szolnok	Szolnok	Tiszaligeti uszoda	1921	
TVSE	Tatabánya	Tatabányai Sportuszoda	1992	
UVSE	Budapest (IV. ker)	Hajós Alfréd Sportuszoda	2008	
Vasas	Budapest (XIII. ker)	Komjádi Béla Sportuszoda	1945	

=== Head coaches ===
Team	Head coach
BVSC	(Hungary) Tamás Märcz (until 1 January 2017) (Hungary) Levente Szűcs (from 5 January 2017)
Debrecen	(Hungary) Péter Komlósi
Eger	(Hungary) Norbert Dabrowski
FTC	(Hungary) Zsolt Varga
Honvéd	(Hungary) Lajos Vad
Kaposvár	(Hungary) Zoltán Szécsi
KSI	(Hungary) János Horváth
MVLC	(Hungary) dr. József Sike
OSC	(Hungary) dr. Balázs Vincze (until 30 March 2017) (Hungary) László Tóth (from 1 April 2017)
PVSK	(Hungary) Gergely Lukács
Szeged	(Hungary) Péter Varga
Szentes	(Hungary) Csaba Pellei
Szolnok	(Hungary) ifj. Sándor Cseh
Tatabánya	(Hungary) Tamás Zantleitner
UVSE	(Hungary) Zsolt Németh
Vasas	(Hungary) László Földi

== Regular season ==
=== Group A ===
	Team	Pld	W	D	L	GF	GA	Diff	Pts	Qualification
1	Szolnoki Dózsa-KÖZGÉP	14	13	0	1	214	91	+123	39	Qualification to Championship round
2	A-HÍD OSC Újbuda	14	11	2	1	191	117	+74	35	Qualification to Championship round
3	ContiTech-Szeged Diapolo	14	7	5	2	148	110	+38	26	Qualification to Championship round
4	VasasPlaket	14	7	1	6	135	143	−8	22	Qualification to Championship round
5	PVSK-Mecsek Füszért	14	6	2	6	125	149	−24	20	Qualification to Relegation round
6	Debreceni VSE	14	4	1	9	119	159	−40	13	Qualification to Relegation round
7	Metalcom-Szentes	14	2	1	11	89	162	−73	7	Qualification to Relegation round
8	KSI SE	14	0	0	14	86	176	−90	0	Qualification to Relegation round

Pld - Played; W - Won; D - Drawn; L - Lost; GF - Goals for; GA - Goals against; Diff - Difference; Pts - Points.

==== Schedule and results ====
Results: waterpolo.hu

1. round ( 2016.09.27. – 09.28. )
Szeged – Szentes	15-7
Szolnok – KSI	16-6
OSC – PVSK	15-5
Vasas – DVSE	11-10

2. round ( 2016.10.05. )
Szolnok – OSC (M4 Sport)	11-14
KSI – DVSE	7-12
Szentes – Vasas	6-11
PVSK – Szeged	5-13

3. round ( 2016.10.08. )
Szentes – DVSE	7-9
Vasas – PVSK	14-13
Szeged – Szolnok	6-11
OSC – KSI	15-7

4. round ( 2016.10.19. )
KSI – Szentes	3-7
Szolnok – Vasas	14-3
OSC – Szeged (M4 Sport)	11-11
PVSK – DVSE	8-8

5. round ( 2016.10.22. )
DVSE – Szolnok	7-23
Vasas – OSC	7-10
Szentes – PVSK	7-11
Szeged – KSI	15-5

6. round ( 2016.11.02. )
Szeged – Vasas	11-11
Szolnok – Szentes	20-6
KSI – PVSK	10-14
OSC – DVSE	14-12

7. round ( 2016.11.05. )
Szentes – OSC	5-16
DVSE – Szeged	5-9
Vasas – KSI	10-6
PVSK – Szolnok	8-15

8. round ( 2016.11.19. )
KSI – Szolnok	4-16
DVSE – Vasas (M4 Sport)	7-8
Szentes – Szeged	5-5
PVSK – OSC	9-10

9. round ( 2016.11.23. – 12.10. )
OSC – Szolnok	7-11
Szeged – PVSK	11-11
DVSE – KSI	12-9
Vasas – Szentes	12-7

10. round ( 2017.01.14. )
KSI – OSC	4-17
Szolnok – Szeged	11-8
DVSE – Szentes	14-6
PVSK – Vasas (M4 Sport)	11-7

11. round ( 2017.01.21. )
DVSE – PVSK	6-8
Vasas – Szolnok	9-12
Szeged – OSC	10-10
Szentes – KSI	7-6

12. round ( 2017.01.28. )
KSI – Szeged	7-11
Szolnok – DVSE	19-4
PVSK – Szentes	9-8
OSC – Vasas (M4 Sport)	16-11

13. round ( 2017.02.01. )
DVSE – OSC	7-19
Szentes – Szolnok	4-14
PVSK – KSI	8-4
Vasas – Szeged	5-12

14. round ( 2017.02.04. )
KSI – Vasas	8-16
Szolnok – PVSK	21-5
Szeged – DVSE	11-6
OSC – Szentes	17-7

=== Group B ===
	Team	Pld	W	D	L	GF	GA	Diff	Pts	Qualification	Head-to-head
1	ZF-Eger	14	13	1	0	179	99	+80	40	Qualification to Championship round	
2	FTC-PQS Waterpolo	14	10	3	1	163	97	+66	33	Qualification to Championship round	
3	PannErgy-Miskolci VLC	14	8	3	3	135	122	+13	27	Qualification to Championship round	
4	MKB-Euroleasing-BVSC-Zugló	14	6	2	6	112	120	−8	20	Qualification to Championship round	BVSC - BHSE: 8–9; BHSE - BVSC: 7–9
5	RacioNet Honvéd	14	6	2	6	125	118	+7	20	Qualification to Relegation round	BVSC - BHSE: 8–9; BHSE - BVSC: 7–9
6	Kaposvári VK	14	3	0	11	120	164	−44	9	Qualification to Relegation round	
7	UVSE	14	2	1	11	117	174	−57	7	Qualification to Relegation round	
8	EBP Tatabánya	14	1	2	11	105	162	−57	5	Qualification to Relegation round	

Pld - Played; W - Won; D - Drawn; L - Lost; GF - Goals for; GA - Goals against; Diff - Difference; Pts - Points.

==== Schedule and results ====
Results: waterpolo.hu

1. round ( 2016.09.27. – 09.28. )
Honvéd – MVLC (M4 Sport)	11-11
FTC – UVSE	10-5
BVSC – Kaposvár	12-10
Eger – Tatabánya	15-6

2. round ( 2016.10.05. )
Tatabánya – MVLC	5-11
Eger – FTC (M4 Sport)	10-10
Kaposvár – Honvéd	10-11
UVSE – BVSC	4-7

3. round ( 2016.10.08. )
MVLC – Kaposvár	12-8
BVSC – Eger (M4 Sport)	7-11
FTC – Tatabánya	18-4
Honvéd – UVSE	17-6

4. round ( 2016.10.19. )
Tatabánya – Kaposvár	8-6
Eger – Honvéd	11-7
FTC – BVSC	11-6
UVSE – MVLC	12-13

5. round ( 2016.10.22. )
Kaposvár – UVSE	12-8
BVSC – Tatabánya	8-7
MVLC – Eger	7-10
Honvéd – FTC	8-12

6. round ( 2016.11.02. )
FTC – MVLC	12-4
Tatabánya – UVSE	11-11
BVSC – Honvéd	8-9
Eger – Kaposvár	13-5

7. round ( 2016.11.05. )
Kaposvár – FTC	9-15
Honvéd – Tatabánya	9-7
UVSE – Eger	8-17
MVLC – BVSC	5-5

8. round ( 2016.11.19. )
UVSE – FTC	5-16
Tatabánya – Eger	9-15
Kaposvár – BVSC	7-6
MVLC – Honvéd	9-7

9. round ( 2016.11.23. – 12.10. )
FTC – Eger (M4 Sport)	7-13
MVLC – Tatabánya	12-9
Honvéd – Kaposvár	12-5
BVSC – UVSE	13-12

10. round ( 2017.01.14. )
Tatabánya – FTC	4-9
Kaposvár – MVLC	7-13
Eger – BVSC	10-7
UVSE – Honvéd	7-12

11. round ( 2017.01.21. )
MVLC – UVSE	13-7
Kaposvár – Tatabánya	17-11
BVSC – FTC	6-6
Honvéd – Eger	5-8

12. round ( 2017.01.28. )
Tatabánya – BVSC	11-12
FTC – Honvéd	11-6
Eger – MVLC	16-8
UVSE – Kaposvár	12-6

13. round ( 2017.02.01. )
Kaposvár – Eger	8-12
MVLC – FTC	7-7
UVSE – Tatabánya	15-9
Honvéd – BVSC	7-9

14. round ( 2017.02.04. )
Tatabánya – Honvéd	4-4
BVSC – MVLC	6-10
Eger – UVSE	18-5
FTC – Kaposvár	19-10

== Second round ==
=== Championship round ===
The top four teams, from two groups advance from the regular season. Teams start the Championship round with their points from the Regular season. Key numbers for pairing determination (number marks position after 14 games):

	Team	Pld	W	D	L	GF	GA	Diff	Pts	Qualification
1	ZF-Eger	22	20	1	1	95	63	+32	61	Qualification to 1st – 4th Placement matches
2	Szolnoki Dózsa-KÖZGÉP	22	20	0	2	108	47	+61	60	Qualification to 1st – 4th Placement matches
3	A-HÍD OSC Újbuda	22	16	2	4	76	73	+3	50	Qualification to 1st – 4th Placement matches
4	FTC-PQS Waterpolo	22	13	4	5	71	78	−7	43	Qualification to 1st – 4th Placement matches
5	PannErgy-Miskolci VLC	22	10	4	8	78	101	−23	34	Qualification to 5th – 8th Placement matches
6	MKB-Euroleasing-BVSC-Zugló	22	10	3	9	74	86	−12	33	Qualification to 5th – 8th Placement matches
7	ContiTech-Szeged Diapolo	22	7	7	8	78	101	−23	28	Qualification to 5th – 8th Placement matches
8	VasasPlaket	22	8	2	12	66	97	−31	26	Qualification to 5th – 8th Placement matches

Pld - Played; W - Won; D - Drawn; L - Lost; GF - Goals for; GA - Goals against; Diff - Difference; Pts - Points.

==== Schedule and results ====
Results: waterpolo.hu

1. round ( 2017.02.22. )
Szolnok – BVSC	17-5
FTC – Szeged	10-10
OSC – MVLC	10-7
Eger – Vasas	15-3

2. round ( 2017.02.25. )
BVSC – Szeged	13-9
Szolnok – FTC	14-2
Vasas – MVLC	7-8
OSC – Eger	6-9

3. round ( 2017.03.04. )
Szeged – Eger	13-16
MVLC – Szolnok	6-17
FTC – Vasas	13-8
OSC – BVSC	9-8

4. round ( 2017.03.08. )
FTC – OSC (M4 Sport)	8-9
Szolnok – Eger (M4 Sport)	11-7
MVLC – Szeged	17-11
BVSC – Vasas	14-8

5. round ( 2017.03.18. )
Szeged – FTC (M4 Sport)	7-9
BVSC – Szolnok	5-16
Vasas – Eger	10-14
MVLC – OSC	9-14

6. round ( 2017.03.25. )
Eger – OSC (M4 Sport)	10-6
FTC – Szolnok	6-13
MVLC – Vasas	11-15
Szeged – BVSC	7-8

7. round ( 2017.03.29. )
Szolnok – MVLC	15-8
Eger – Szeged	16-9
Vasas – FTC	6-13
BVSC – OSC	12-11

8. round ( 2017.04.01. )
Vasas – BVSC	9-9
Szeged – MVLC	12-12
Eger – Szolnok	8-5
OSC – FTC	11-10

=== Relegation round ===
The bottom four teams, from two groups advance from the regular season. Teams start the Relegation round with their points from the Regular season.

	Team	Pld	W	D	L	GF	GA	Diff	Pts	Qualification
9	RacioNet Honvéd	22	13	3	6	97	68	+29	42	Qualification to 9th – 12th Placement matches
10	PVSK-Mecsek Füszért	22	9	3	10	71	69	+2	30	Qualification to 9th – 12th Placement matches
11	Kaposvári VK	22	9	2	11	97	75	+22	29	Qualification to 9th – 12th Placement matches
12	Debreceni VSE	22	7	3	12	93	82	+11	24	Qualification to 9th – 12th Placement matches
13	UVSE	22	7	1	14	81	77	+4	22	Qualification to 13th – 16th Placement matches
14	EBP Tatabánya	22	4	2	16	72	78	−6	14	Qualification to 13th – 16th Placement matches
15	Metalcom-Szentes	22	3	1	18	68	96	−28	10	Qualification to 13th – 16th Placement matches
16	KSI SE	22	1	0	21	66	100	−34	3	Qualification to 13th – 16th Placement matches

Pld - Played; W - Won; D - Drawn; L - Lost; GF - Goals for; GA - Goals against; Diff - Difference; Pts - Points.

==== Schedule and results ====
Results: waterpolo.hu

1. round ( 2017.02.22. )
DVSE – UVSE	17-9
PVSK – Tatabánya	11-6
Kaposvár – Szentes	11-5
Honvéd – KSI	11-9

2. round ( 2017.02.25. )
Tatabánya – Szentes	15-13
Honvéd – DVSE	11-10
KSI – UVSE	6-15
PVSK – Kaposvár	12-13

3. round ( 2017.03.04. )
Tatabánya – DVSE	11-10
Kaposvár – KSI	12-8
UVSE – PVSK	5-9
Szentes – Honvéd	8-14

4. round ( 2017.03.08. )
PVSK – Honvéd	10-12
DVSE – Kaposvár	14-14
KSI – Tatabánya	8-12
UVSE – Szentes	11-9

5. round ( 2017.03.18. )
KSI – Honvéd	7-14
Tatabánya – PVSK	7-9
Szentes – Kaposvár	7-12
UVSE – DVSE	6-11

6. round ( 2017.03.25. )
DVSE – Honvéd	13-13
Kaposvár – PVSK	8-8
Szentes – Tatabánya	8-6
UVSE – KSI	12-6

7. round ( 2017.03.29. )
PVSK – UVSE	7-10
Honvéd – Szentes	14-6
DVSE – Tatabánya	10-8
KSI – Kaposvár	13-17

8. round ( 2017.04.01. )
Tatabánya – KSI	7-9
Kaposvár – DVSE	10-8
Szentes – UVSE	12-13
Honvéd – PVSK	8-5

== Final round ==
=== 1st – 4th Placement matches ===
Team 1	Points	Team 2	Games in the season		Game 1	Game 2	Game 3
ZF-Eger (1)	7–1	FTC-PQS Waterpolo (4)	10-10	7-13	10-7	—	—
Szolnoki Dózsa-KÖZGÉP (2)	9–6	A-HÍD OSC Újbuda (3)	11-14	11-7	13-10	6-7	10-9

Game 1

15 April 2017; 20:00 (CEST)	Report	ZF-Eger	10–7	FTC-PQS Waterpolo	Bitskey Aladár uszoda, Eger; Referees: Rubos, Petrovics
15 April 2017; 20:00 (CEST)	Report	Score by quarters: 1-2, 3-1, 3-2, 3-2			Bitskey Aladár uszoda, Eger; Referees: Rubos, Petrovics
15 April 2017; 20:00 (CEST)	Report	Decker, Hárai, Ćuk 2	Goals	Nyéki, Mitrović 2	Bitskey Aladár uszoda, Eger; Referees: Rubos, Petrovics

ZF-Eger won the series 7–1 with points ratio, and advanced to the Final.

16 April 2017; 18:00 (CEST)	Report	Szolnoki Dózsa-KÖZGÉP	13–10	A-HÍD OSC Újbuda	Tiszaligeti uszoda, Szolnok; Referees: Marnitz, Dodog
16 April 2017; 18:00 (CEST)	Report	Score by quarters: 2-3, 4-3, 3-2, 4-2			Tiszaligeti uszoda, Szolnok; Referees: Marnitz, Dodog
16 April 2017; 18:00 (CEST)	Report	Prlainović 4	Goals	Zalánki, Salamon 3	Tiszaligeti uszoda, Szolnok; Referees: Marnitz, Dodog

Game 2

19 April 2017; 20:00 (CEST)	Report	A-HÍD OSC Újbuda	7–6	Szolnoki Dózsa-KÖZGÉP	Nyéki Imre uszoda, Budapest; Referees: Molnár, Petik
19 April 2017; 20:00 (CEST)	Report	Score by quarters: 2-1, 1-1, 3-2, 1-2			Nyéki Imre uszoda, Budapest; Referees: Molnár, Petik
19 April 2017; 20:00 (CEST)	Report	Salamon 2	Goals	Prlainović 3	Nyéki Imre uszoda, Budapest; Referees: Molnár, Petik

Game 3

22 April 2017; 18:00 (CEST)	Report	Szolnoki Dózsa-KÖZGÉP	10–9	A-HÍD OSC Újbuda	Tiszaligeti uszoda, Szolnok; Referees: Székely, Benczur
22 April 2017; 18:00 (CEST)	Report	Score by quarters: 2-3, 3-3, 1-1, 4-2			Tiszaligeti uszoda, Szolnok; Referees: Székely, Benczur
22 April 2017; 18:00 (CEST)	Report	Vámos 4	Goals	Salamon 3	Tiszaligeti uszoda, Szolnok; Referees: Székely, Benczur

Szolnoki Dózsa-KÖZGÉP won the series 9–6 with points ratio, and advanced to the Final.

==== Final ====
Higher ranked team hosted Game 1 and Game 3 plus Game 5 if necessary. The lower ranked hosted Game 2 plus Game 4 if necessary.

Team 1	Agg.	Team 2	Game 1	Game 2	Game 3	Game 4	Game 5
ZF-Eger	0–3	Szolnoki Dózsa-KÖZGÉP	7-13	6-9	3-8	—	—

1 May 2017; 17:30 (CEST)	Report	ZF-Eger	7–13	Szolnoki Dózsa-KÖZGÉP	Bitskey Aladár uszoda, Eger; Attendance: 1,224; Referees: Molnár, Bene
1 May 2017; 17:30 (CEST)	Report	Score by quarters: 1-2, 2-1, 3-5, 1-5			Bitskey Aladár uszoda, Eger; Attendance: 1,224; Referees: Molnár, Bene
1 May 2017; 17:30 (CEST)	Report	Čučković 2	Goals	Varga 5	Bitskey Aladár uszoda, Eger; Attendance: 1,224; Referees: Molnár, Bene

5 May 2017; 19:00 (CEST)	Report	Szolnoki Dózsa-KÖZGÉP	9–6	ZF-Eger	Tiszaligeti uszoda, Szolnok; Attendance: 1,100; Referees: Petik, Dodog
5 May 2017; 19:00 (CEST)	Report	Score by quarters: 1-3, 3-0, 2-2, 3-1			Tiszaligeti uszoda, Szolnok; Attendance: 1,100; Referees: Petik, Dodog
5 May 2017; 19:00 (CEST)	Report	Vámos 3	Goals	Kovács 3	Tiszaligeti uszoda, Szolnok; Attendance: 1,100; Referees: Petik, Dodog

10 May 2017; 18:00 (CEST)	Report	ZF-Eger	3–8	Szolnoki Dózsa-KÖZGÉP	Bitskey Aladár uszoda, Eger; Attendance: 1,224; Referees: Székely, Berki
10 May 2017; 18:00 (CEST)	Report	Score by quarters: 1-3, 2-3, 0-1, 0-1			Bitskey Aladár uszoda, Eger; Attendance: 1,224; Referees: Székely, Berki
10 May 2017; 18:00 (CEST)	Report	Decker, Hárai, Biros 1	Goals	Prlainović 4	Bitskey Aladár uszoda, Eger; Attendance: 1,224; Referees: Székely, Berki

Szolnoki Dózsa-KÖZGÉP won the Final series 3–0.

2016–17 Országos Bajnokság I
Champion

9th title

==== Third place ====
Higher ranked team hosted Game 1 plus Game 3 if necessary. The lower ranked hosted Game 2.

Team 1	Agg.	Team 2	Game 1	Game 2	Game 3
A-HÍD OSC Újbuda	2–0	FTC-PQS Waterpolo	9-7	11-7	—

29 April 2017; 19:00 (CEST)	Report	A-HÍD OSC Újbuda	9–7	FTC-PQS Waterpolo	Nyéki Imre uszoda, Budapest; Referees: Fodor, Marnitz
29 April 2017; 19:00 (CEST)	Report	Score by quarters: 2-3, 2-1, 4-3, 1-0			Nyéki Imre uszoda, Budapest; Referees: Fodor, Marnitz
29 April 2017; 19:00 (CEST)	Report	Zalánki, Salamon 3	Goals	Varga, Mitrović, Madaras 2	Nyéki Imre uszoda, Budapest; Referees: Fodor, Marnitz

6 May 2017; 18:00 (CEST)	Report	FTC-PQS Waterpolo	7–11	A-HÍD OSC Újbuda	Népligeti uszoda, Budapest; Referees: Kun, Marjay
6 May 2017; 18:00 (CEST)	Report	Score by quarters: 1-4, 2-4, 2-2, 2-1			Népligeti uszoda, Budapest; Referees: Kun, Marjay
6 May 2017; 18:00 (CEST)	Report	Madaras 3	Goals	four players 2	Népligeti uszoda, Budapest; Referees: Kun, Marjay

A-HÍD OSC Újbuda won the Third place.

=== 5th – 8th Placement matches ===
Team 1	Points	Team 2	Games in the season		Game 1	Game 2	Game 3
PannErgy-Miskolci VLC (5)	9–3	VasasPlaket (8)	11-15	8-7	12-8	16-13	—
MKB-Euroleasing-BVSC-Zugló (6)	9–0	ContiTech-Szeged Diapolo (7)	13-9	8-7	14-9	—	—

Fifth place game

Higher ranked team hosted Game 1 plus Game 3 if necessary. The lower ranked hosted Game 2.

Team 1	Agg.	Team 2	Game 1	Game 2	Game 3
PannErgy-Miskolci VLC	2–1	MKB-Euroleasing-BVSC-Zugló	8-6	7-8	11-6

Seventh place game

Higher ranked team hosted Game 1 plus Game 3 if necessary. The lower ranked hosted Game 2.

Team 1	Agg.	Team 2	Game 1	Game 2	Game 3
ContiTech-Szeged Diapolo	2–0	VasasPlaket	11-7	10-9	—

=== 9th – 12th Placement matches ===
Team 1	Points	Team 2	Games in the season		Game 1	Game 2	Game 3
RacioNet Honvéd (9)	7–4	Debreceni VSE (12)	11-10	13-13	11-12	11-10	—
PVSK-Mecsek Füszért (10)	1–7	Kaposvári VK (11)	12-13	8-8	7-11	—	—

Ninth place game

Higher ranked team hosted Game 1 plus Game 3 if necessary. The lower ranked hosted Game 2.

Team 1	Agg.	Team 2	Game 1	Game 2	Game 3
RacioNet Honvéd	2–0	Kaposvári VK	9-5	11-7	—

Eleventh place game

Higher ranked team hosted Game 1 plus Game 3 if necessary. The lower ranked hosted Game 2.

Team 1	Agg.	Team 2	Game 1	Game 2	Game 3
PVSK-Mecsek Füszért	0–2	Debreceni VSE	10-11	13-12 (p)	—

=== 13th – 16th Placement matches ===
Team 1	Points	Team 2	Games in the season		Game 1	Game 2	Game 3
UVSE (13)	9–0	KSI SE (16)	12-6	15-6	10-7	—	—
EBP Tatabánya (14)	9–6	Metalcom-Szentes (15)	15-13	6-8	13-11 (p)	11-13	6-5

Thirteenth place game

Higher ranked team hosted Game 1 plus Game 3 if necessary. The lower ranked hosted Game 2.

Team 1	Agg.	Team 2	Game 1	Game 2	Game 3
UVSE	2–0	EBP Tatabánya	14-11	8-7	—

Fifteenth place game

Higher ranked team hosted Game 1 plus Game 3 if necessary. The lower ranked hosted Game 2.

Team 1	Agg.	Team 2	Game 1	Game 2	Game 3
Metalcom-Szentes	2–0	KSI SE	12-7	13-9	—

== Season statistics ==
=== Top goalscorers ===
As of matches played on 16 May 2017.

Rank	Player	Team	Goals
1	(Hungary) Dénes Varga	Szolnok	87
2	(Hungary) Márton Szívós	Honvéd	70
3	(United States) Alex Bowen	MVLC	67
4	(Montenegro) Saša Mišić	MVLC	59
5	(Hungary) Krisztián Manhercz	Szeged	53
5	(Hungary) Tamás Gyárfás	Honvéd	53
7	(Hungary) Dániel Francsics	Tatabánya	52
8	(Serbia) Andrija Prlainović	Szolnok	49
9	(Hungary) Ferenc Salamon	OSC	48
10	(Hungary) Márton Vámos	Szolnok	45

=== Top exclusions ===
As of matches played on 16 May 2017.

Rank	Player	Team	Fouls
1	(Slovakia) Kristián Polovic	Kaposvár	56
2	(Hungary) Dávid Jansik	Szolnok	55
2	(Hungary) András Krizsán	PVSK	55
4	(Hungary) Dénes Dorián Lukács	MVLC	54
4	(Netherlands) Sebastiaan van Mil	Szentes	54
6	(Slovakia) (Hungary) Erik Bundschuch	OSC	53
7	(Hungary) Gyula Kiss	Tatabánya	52
8	(Hungary) Miklós Gór-Nagy	OSC	51
8	(Hungary) Adrián Simon	Honvéd	51
8	(Hungary) Bálint Takács	Vasas	51

=== Most valuable player ===
As of matches played on 16 May 2017.

Rank	Player	Team	Rating
1	(Montenegro) Saša Mišić	MVLC	97.2
2	(Hungary) Dénes Varga	Szolnok	85.8
3	(Hungary) Márton Szívós	Honvéd	77.5
4	(Slovakia) Lukáš Ďurík	DVSE	58.3
5	(Hungary) Balázs Máthé	Tatabánya	51.9
6	(United States) Alex Bowen	MVLC	50.3
7	(Hungary) Ferenc Vindisch	Kaposvár	49.3
8	(Hungary) dr. Ádám Steinmetz	Vasas	49.0
9	(Serbia) Miloš Vukićević	Szeged	47.6
10	(Serbia) Andrija Prlainović	Szolnok	47.1

=== Discipline ===
As of 16 May 2017.

- Most goals conceded (club): 23
  - Szolnoki Dózsa-KÖZGÉP vs. Debreceni VSE / Round 5, (Group A)
- Most goals conceded: 30
  - Szolnoki Dózsa-KÖZGÉP 23–7 Debreceni VSE / Round 5, (Group A)
- Fewest goals conceded (club): 3
  - KSI SE vs. Szentesi VK / Round 4, (Group A)
- Fewest goals conceded: 8
  - EBP Tatabánya 4–4 RacioNet Honvéd / Round 14, (Group B)
- Attendance:
  - Highest: 1,224 ZF-Eger vs. Szolnoki Dózsa-KÖZGÉP / Final (1,3)
  - Lowest: 50 KSI SE vs. Debreceni VSE and Szentesi VK

== Final standing ==
Pos	Team	Qualification or Relegation
1st place, gold medalist(s)	Szolnoki Dózsa-KÖZGÉP	Qualification to Champions League preliminary round
2nd place, silver medalist(s)	ZF-Eger	Qualification to Champions League second qualifying round
3rd place, bronze medalist(s)	A-HÍD OSC Újbuda	Qualification to Champions League first qualifying round
4	FTC-PQS Waterpolo	Qualification to Euro Cup first qualifying round
5	PannErgy-Miskolci VLC	Qualification to Euro Cup first qualifying round
6	MKB-Euroleasing-BVSC-Zugló	
7	ContiTech-Szeged Diapolo	
8	VasasPlaket	
9	RacioNet Honvéd	
10	Kaposvári VK	
11	Debreceni VSE	
12	PVSK-Mecsek Füszért	
13	UVSE	
14	EBP Tatabánya	
15	Metalcom-Szentes	
16	KSI SE	Relegation to Országos Bajnokság I/B

=== Awards ===
- Best Goalkeeper: (Hungary) Viktor Nagy (Szolnoki Dózsa-KÖZGÉP)
- Best Field player: (Hungary) Márton Vámos (Szolnoki Dózsa-KÖZGÉP)

== Number of teams by counties ==
Pos.	County (megye)	No. of teams	Teams
1	Budapest (capital)	7	BVSC, FTC, Honvéd, KSI, OSC, UVSE and Vasas
2	Csongrád	2	Szegedi VE and Szentesi VK
3	Baranya	1	PVSK
3	Borsod-Abaúj-Zemplén	1	MVLC
3	Hajdú-Bihar	1	DVSE
3	Heves	1	Egri VK
3	Jász-Nagykun-Szolnok	1	Szolnoki Dózsa
3	Komárom-Esztergom	1	Tatabányai VSE
3	Somogy	1	Kaposvári VK

== See also ==
- 2016 Magyar Kupa
