= 2021–22 Országos Bajnokság I (men's water polo) =

Water polo season

E.ON Férfi OB I Bajnokság^{1}
- Season: 2021–22
- Duration: September 8, 2021 – March 26, 2022 (Regular season)
- Teams: 14
- TV partner: M4 Sport

Regular season
- Top seed: FTC Telekom
- Relegated: DVSE-Master Good

Finals
- Champions: FTC Telekom (24th title)
- Runners-up: Genesys OSC-Újbuda
- Third place: A-Híd VasasPlaket
- Fourth place: Szolnoki Dózsa
- ^{1} Sponsored league name, referring to E.ON.

The 2021–22 Országos Bajnokság I (also known as the E.ON Férfi OB I Bajnokság for sponsorship reasons, OB I in short), is going to be the 116th season of top-tier water polo in Hungary. A total of fourteen teams contest this season's league, which began on 8 September 2021 and will conclude on 18 May 2022.

FTC-Telekom won their twenty-fourth title.

== Teams ==
Location of teams in 2021–22 Országos Bajnokság I
Budapest OB I waterpolo teams

The following 14 clubs compete in the OB I during the 2021–22 season:

Team	Home city	Pool	Colours	2020–21
BVSC	Budapest (XIV. ker)	Szőnyi úti Uszoda		4th
Debrecen	Debrecen	Debreceni Sportuszoda		14th
Eger	Eger	Bitskey Aladár Uszoda		8th
Ferencváros	Budapest (IX. ker)	FTC uszoda, Népliget		3rd
Bp. Honvéd	Budapest (XIX. ker)	Kőér utcai Uszoda		6th
Kaposvár	Kaposvár	Csík Ferenc Sportuszoda		12th
Miskolc	Miskolc	Kemény Dénes Sportuszoda		9th
OSC	Budapest (XI. ker)	Nyéki Imre Uszoda		2nd
PVSK	Pécs	Abay Nemes Oszkár Sportuszoda		10th
Szeged	Szeged	Tiszavirág Sportuszoda		13th
Szentes	Szentes	Dr. Rébeli Szabó József Sportuszoda		11th
Szolnok	Szolnok	Vízilabda Aréna		1st
UVSE	Budapest (IV. ker)	Komjádi Béla Sportuszoda		7th
Vasas	Budapest (XIII. ker)	Komjádi Béla Sportuszoda		5th

=== Personnel and sponsors ===
Team	Head coach	Captain	Cap manufacturer	Cap sponsors
BVSC	(Hungary) Kristóf Kemény	(Hungary) Mátyás Pásztor	Diapolo	none
Debrecen	(Hungary) Máté Süveges		Diapolo	none
Eger	(Hungary) Márton Petrovai	(Hungary) Máté Sántavy	Diapolo	Tigra, ZF
Ferencváros	(Hungary) Zsolt Varga	(Hungary) Dénes Varga	Diapolo	Telekom, MVM
Bp. Honvéd	(Hungary) Márton Szívós	(Hungary) Norbert Hosnyánszky	Arena	none
Kaposvár	(Hungary) László Surányi	(Hungary) Ferenc Vindisch	Seles	none
Miskolc	(Hungary) István Kis	(Slovakia) Lukáš Seman	Diapolo	PannErgy
OSC	(Hungary) Dániel Varga	(Hungary) Balázs Hárai	Diapolo	MOL
PVSK	(Hungary) Viktor Török		Diapolo	none
Szeged	(Hungary) Zoltán Szabó	(Hungary) Csaba Kiss	Diapolo	none
Szentes	(Hungary) Csaba Pellei	(Hungary) Balázs Somogyi	Yordo	metALCOM
Szolnok	(Serbia) Živko Gocić	(Hungary) Dániel Angyal	Arena	none
UVSE	(Hungary) Balázs Vincze	(Hungary) Balázs Korényi	Diapolo	none
Vasas	(Serbia) Slobodan Nikić	(Hungary) Bence Bátori	Diapolo	A-Híd, Plaket

=== Managerial changes ===
Team	Outgoing manager	Manner of departure	Date of vacancy	Position in table	Replaced by	Date of appointment	Ref.
Debrecen	(Serbia) Miroslav Bajin	Signed by Vojvodina	21 June 2021	Pre-season	(Hungary) Máté Süveges	21 June 2021	
Vasas	(Hungary) Lajos Vad	Sacked	12 October 2021	5th	(Serbia) Slobodan Nikić	29 October 2021	

== Regular season ==
=== Standings ===
Pos	Team	Pld	W	D	L	GF	GA	GD	Pts	Qualification or relegation
1	FTC Telekom	26	23	2	1	352	215	+137	71	Qualification for the championship play-offs
2	Szolnoki Dózsa	26	21	2	3	350	204	+146	65	Qualification for the championship play-offs
3	Genesys OSC-Újbuda	26	20	4	2	360	216	+144	64	Qualification for the championship play-offs
4	A-Híd VasasPlaket	26	19	3	4	287	193	+94	60	Qualification for the championship play-offs
5	BVSC-Zugló	26	15	3	8	303	246	+57	48	Qualification for the 5th–8th placement matches
6	Budapesti Honvéd SE	26	14	3	9	272	239	+33	45	Qualification for the 5th–8th placement matches
7	Szegedi VE	26	10	1	15	227	263	−36	31	Qualification for the 5th–8th placement matches
8	PVSK-Mecsek Füszért	26	9	3	14	222	285	−63	30	Qualification for the 5th–8th placement matches
9	Tigra-ZF-Eger	26	9	1	16	276	322	−46	28	Qualification for the 9th–12th placement matches
10	Kaposvári VK	26	7	4	15	263	319	−56	25	Qualification for the 9th–12th placement matches
11	UVSE-Hunguest Hotels, Tungsram	26	7	2	17	230	324	−94	23	Qualification for the 9th–12th placement matches
12	PannErgy-MVLC Miskolc	26	6	3	17	248	329	−81	21	Qualification for the 9th–12th placement matches
13	Metalcom Szentes	26	2	3	21	214	335	−121	9 (Note: Szentes were ranked ahead of Debrecen on head-to-head results: 21–20.)	Qualification for the Relegation play-offs
14	DVSE-Master Good	26	3	0	23	216	330	−114	9	Relegation to the Országos Bajnokság I/B

Source: Hungarian Water Polo Federation (in Hungarian)
Rules for classification: 1) Points; 2) Head-to-head points; 3) Head-to-head goal difference; 4) Goal difference according to the overall result; 5) Goals scored; 6) Draw (Note: Head-to-head record is used only after all the matches between the teams in question have been played)

=== Schedule and results ===
In the table below the home teams are listed on the left and the away teams along the top.

Home \ Away	BVSC	DVSE	EGER	FTC	BHSE	KAP	MIS	OSC	PVSK	SZEG	SZEN	SZOL	UVSE	VAS
BVSC	—	14–8	15–5	11–14	11–10	11–13	13–8	9–16	13–7	14–7	12–7	5–13	15–6	11–8
Debrecen	9–12	—	9–8	8–16	11–12	14–13	11–12	7–19	5–7	3–9	13–9	6–13	11–13	6–10
Eger	8–19	17–2	—	9–14	13–15	10–7	18–13	7–17	14–6	15–11	11–10	8–13	20–16	9–17
Ferencváros	7–6	19–11	17–11	—	6–5	22–10	15–9	7–6	23–7	13–9	13–6	10–7	14–8	11–5
Bp. Honvéd	10–10	13–6	12–7	7–14	—	12–11	14–9	8–8	6–7	7–5	13–11	7–10	18–9	7–8
Kaposvár	9–15	11–9	10–8	8–16	8–12	—	13–13	7–16	14–12	10–8	17–6	7–15	12–12	8–11
Miskolc	8–13	15–12	13–12	10–11	8–12	12–12	—	7–21	7–8	6–9	7–7	4–18	12–7	10–17
OSC	16–11	11–7	17–9	10–10	13–6	17–11	20–7	—	16–11	16–8	23–13	11–11	14–7	11–11
PVSK	10–10	14–9	8–10	5–16	12–10	13–9	13–9	7–12	—	6–10	12–9	5–11	10–9	6–9
Szeged	9–10	9–7	11–11	8–12	6–11	10–8	8–11	7–14	10–7	—	13–6	8–13	9–6	9–10
Szentes	13–10	12–7	12–15	12–21	4–12	7–7	9–10	5–9	9–9	7–11	—	6–17	10–13	5–15
Szolnok	11–11	15–9	13–6	11–10	16–10	15–9	15–11	8–9	17–7	21–5	20–9	—	19–8	9–8
UVSE	4–15	12–8	10–7	7–12	7–14	15–10	9–8	7–12	8–8	9–14	13–7	6–14	—	3–13
Vasas	10–7	15–8	15–8	9–9	9–9	8–9	12–9	8–6	10–5	10–4	12–3	9–5	18–6	—

Source: Hungarian Water Polo Federation (in Hungarian), FlashScore
Legend: Blue = home team win; Yellow = draw; Red = away team win.
For upcoming matches, an "a" indicates there is an article about the rivalry between the two participants.

== Play-offs ==
=== Championship play-offs ===
==== Semi-finals ====
Team 1	Points	Team 2	Regular season		Game 1	Game 2	Game 3
FTC Telekom (1)	7–1	(4) A-Híd VasasPlaket	15–9	9–9	15–14 (p)	–	–
Szolnoki Dózsa (2)	1–7	(3) Genesys OSC-Újbuda	8–9	11–11	9–13	–	–

FTC Telekom v A-Híd VasasPlaket

3 April 2022; 19:00	Report	FTC Telekom	9–9 ^{(6–5 PSO)} (PSO)	A-Híd VasasPlaket	Komjádi Béla Sportuszoda, Budapest; Attendance: 1,500; Referees: Rubos, Marjay
3 April 2022; 19:00	Report	Score by quarters: 3–0, 0–3, 4–3, 2–3 PSO: 6–5			Komjádi Béla Sportuszoda, Budapest; Attendance: 1,500; Referees: Rubos, Marjay
3 April 2022; 19:00	Report	Vámos 5	Goals	Bátori 4	Komjádi Béla Sportuszoda, Budapest; Attendance: 1,500; Referees: Rubos, Marjay

FTC Telekom won the series 7–1 with points ratio, and advanced to the Finals.

Szolnoki Dózsa v Genesys OSC-Újbuda

2 April 2022; 18:30	Report	Szolnoki Dózsa	9–13	Genesys OSC-Újbuda	Vízilabda Aréna, Szolnok; Attendance: 700; Referees: Tóth, Csanádi
2 April 2022; 18:30	Report	Score by quarters: 0–3, 5–3, 3–5, 1–2			Vízilabda Aréna, Szolnok; Attendance: 700; Referees: Tóth, Csanádi
2 April 2022; 18:30	Report	three players 2	Goals	Vi. Vigvári 4	Vízilabda Aréna, Szolnok; Attendance: 700; Referees: Tóth, Csanádi

Genesys OSC-Újbuda won the series 7–1 with points ratio, and advanced to the Finals.

==== Finals ====
The Finals series were played best-of-three format, with the higher seeded team playing the first and third (if it was necessary) game at home.

Team 1	Series	Team 2	Game 1	Game 2	Game 3
FTC Telekom	2–0	Genesys OSC-Újbuda	18–9	15–7	–

Game 1

6 May 2022; 19:00	Report	FTC Telekom	18–9	Genesys OSC-Újbuda	Komjádi Béla Sportuszoda, Budapest; Attendance: 2,000; Referees: Csanádi, Kun
6 May 2022; 19:00	Report	Score by quarters: 3–1, 6–4, 5–3, 4–1			Komjádi Béla Sportuszoda, Budapest; Attendance: 2,000; Referees: Csanádi, Kun
6 May 2022; 19:00	Report	Ve. Vigvári, Jansik 5	Goals	Sziládi, Salamon 3	Komjádi Béla Sportuszoda, Budapest; Attendance: 2,000; Referees: Csanádi, Kun

Game 2

18 May 2022; 18:30	Report	Genesys OSC-Újbuda	7–15	FTC Telekom	Nyéki Imre uszoda, Budapest; Attendance: 1,200; Referees: Tóth, Kovács Cs.
18 May 2022; 18:30	Report	Score by quarters: 4–6, 0–3, 2–4, 1–2			Nyéki Imre uszoda, Budapest; Attendance: 1,200; Referees: Tóth, Kovács Cs.
18 May 2022; 18:30	Report	Manhercz, Burián 2	Goals	Fekete, Damonte 3	Nyéki Imre uszoda, Budapest; Attendance: 1,200; Referees: Tóth, Kovács Cs.

FTC-Telekom Waterpolo won the Final series 2–0.

==== Third place series ====
The Third place series were played best-of-three format, with the higher seeded team playing the first and third (if it was necessary) game at home.

Team 1	Series	Team 2	Game 1	Game 2	Game 3
Szolnoki Dózsa	0–2	A-Híd VasasPlaket	6–15	8–15	–

Game 1

7 May 2022; 18:00	Report	Szolnoki Dózsa	6–15	A-Híd VasasPlaket	Vízilabda Aréna, Szolnok; Attendance: 250; Referees: Petik, Rubos
7 May 2022; 18:00	Report	Score by quarters: 1–2, 1–6, 2–5, 2–2			Vízilabda Aréna, Szolnok; Attendance: 250; Referees: Petik, Rubos
7 May 2022; 18:00	Report	Szeghalmi, Konarik 2	Goals	three players 3	Vízilabda Aréna, Szolnok; Attendance: 250; Referees: Petik, Rubos

Game 2

14 May 2022; 19:30	Report	A-Híd VasasPlaket	15–8	Szolnoki Dózsa	Komjádi Béla Sportuszoda, Budapest; Attendance: 800; Referees: Kollár, Kenéz
14 May 2022; 19:30	Report	Score by quarters: 3–1, 5–2, 4–1, 3–4			Komjádi Béla Sportuszoda, Budapest; Attendance: 800; Referees: Kollár, Kenéz
14 May 2022; 19:30	Report	three players 4	Goals	Angyal 3	Komjádi Béla Sportuszoda, Budapest; Attendance: 800; Referees: Kollár, Kenéz

A-Híd VasasPlaket won the Third place series 2–0.

=== 5th–8th Placement matches ===
==== 5–8th place semi-finals ====
Team 1	Points	Team 2	Regular season		Game 1	Game 2	Game 3
BVSC-Zugló (5)	7–1	(8) PVSK-Mecsek Füszért	13–7	10–10	17–5	–	–
Budapesti Honvéd SE (6)	9–0	(7) Szegedi VE	7–5	11–6	12–11	–	–

==== Fifth place series ====
Team 1	Points	Team 2	Regular season		Game 1	Game 2	Game 3
BVSC-Zugló	4–7	Budapesti Honvéd SE	11–10	10–10	11–13 (p)	9−10	–

==== Seventh place series ====
Team 1	Points	Team 2	Regular season		Game 1	Game 2	Game 3
Szegedi VE	9–0	PVSK-Mecsek Füszért	10–7	10–6	12–10 (p)	–	–

=== 9th–12th Placement matches ===
==== 9–12th place semi-finals ====
Team 1	Points	Team 2	Regular season		Game 1	Game 2	Game 3
Tigra-ZF-Eger (9)	9–6	(12) PannErgy-MVLC Miskolc	18–13	12–13	17–9	12–13	15–11
Kaposvári VK (10)	7–4	(11) UVSE-Hunguest Hotels, Tungsram	12–12	10–15	14–9	11–5	–

==== Ninth place series ====
Team 1	Points	Team 2	Regular season		Game 1	Game 2	Game 3
Tigra-ZF-Eger	3–9	Kaposvári VK	10–7	8–10	8–9	10–16	–

==== Eleventh place series ====
Team 1	Points	Team 2	Regular season		Game 1	Game 2	Game 3
UVSE-Hunguest Hotels, Tungsram	3–9	PannErgy-MVLC Miskolc	9–8	7–12	10–11	13–14 (p)	–

=== Promotion/relegation play-offs ===
The Promotion/relegation play-offs series were played best-of-three format, with the higher seeded team (13th placed in OB I regular season) playing the first and third (if it was necessary) game at home.

Team 1	Series	Team 2	Game 1	Game 2	Game 3
Metalcom Szentes (I)	2–0	(I/B) Kanizsa VSE	14–7	22–14	–

Metalcom Szentes won the 2–0 on series and therefore both clubs remain in their respective leagues.

== Final standings ==
Qualified for the 2022–23 LEN Champions League
Qualified for the 2022–23 LEN Euro Cup
Relegated to Országos Bajnokság I/B

Rank	Team
1st place, gold medalist(s)	FTC Telekom (C)
2nd place, silver medalist(s)	Genesys OSC-Újbuda
3rd place, bronze medalist(s)	A-Híd VasasPlaket
4	Szolnoki Dózsa
5	Budapesti Honvéd SE
6	BVSC-Zugló
7	Szegedi VE
8	PVSK-Mecsek Füszért
9	Kaposvári VK
10	Tigra-ZF-Eger
11	PannErgy-MVLC Miskolc
12	UVSE-Hunguest Hotels, Tungsram
13	Metalcom Szentes (O)
14	DVSE-Master Good (R)

Sources: MVLSZ
(C) Champion; (O) Play-off winner; (R) Relegated

2021–22 Országos Bajnokság I
Champion

24th title

Roster
Luca Damonte, Szabolcs Dubinák, Gergő Fekete, Lőrinc Gábor, Sándor Gál, Szilárd Jansik, Gergely Klár, Daniil Merkulov, Erik Molnár, Toni Német, Balázs Nyíri, Zoltán Pohl, Márk Spitz, Dániel Szakonyi, Nemanja Ubović, Dénes Varga (c), Vincze Varga, Márton Vámos, Vendel Vigvári
Head coach
Zsolt Varga

== Statistics ==
=== Top goalscorers ===
Rank	Player	Club	Goals	Shots	%
1	(Hungary) Dániel Angyal	Szolnok	75	152	49
2	(Hungary) Bence Bátori	Vasas	73	140	52
3	(Hungary) Krisztián Manhercz	OSC	65	149	44
4	(Hungary) Gergely Burián	OSC	62	150	41
5	(Hungary) Barnabás Biros	Miskolc	62	177	35
6	(Hungary) Norbert Hosnyánszky	Bp. Honvéd	61	158	39
7	(Montenegro) Nikola Murišić	Eger	60	112	54
8	(Hungary) Mátyás Pásztor	BVSC	58	160	36
9	(Hungary) Benedek Baksa	Eger	58	164	35
10	(Hungary) Vendel Vigvári	Ferencváros	55	107	51

== See also ==
- 2021 Magyar Kupa
