= 2018–19 Országos Bajnokság I (men's water polo) =

Water polo league season

e·on férfi OB I
- Season: 2018–19
- Champions: FTC-Telekom Waterpolo (23rd title)
- Relegated: KSI SE
- Champions League: FTC-Telekom Waterpolo; A-HÍD OSC Újbuda; Szolnoki Dózsa
- cEuro Cup: ZF-Eger; PannErgy-Miskolci VLC
- Top goalscorer: Marcell Kolozsi (55 goals)

The 2018–19 Országos Bajnokság I (known as the e·on férfi OB I osztályú Országos Bajnokság for sponsorship reasons) was the 113th season of the Országos Bajnokság I, Hungary's premier Water polo league.

== Team information ==
Location of teams in 2018-19 Országos Bajnokság I
Budapest OB I waterpolo teams

The following 16 clubs compete in the OB I during the 2018–19 season:

OB I
Team	City	Pool	Founded	Colours
AVUS	Szombathely	Szombathelyi Városi Uszoda	2010	
BVSC	Budapest (XIV. ker)	Szőnyi úti uszoda	1911	
Debrecen	Debrecen	Debreceni Sportuszoda	2006	
Eger	Eger	Bitskey Aladár uszoda	1910	
FTC	Budapest (IX. ker)	Népligeti uszoda	1899	
Honvéd	Budapest (XIX. ker)	Kőér utcai uszoda	1950	
Kaposvár	Kaposvár	Virágfürdő	1999	
KSI	Budapest	Széchy Tamás uszoda	1963	
Miskolc	Miskolc	Kemény Dénes Sportuszoda	2012	
OSC	Budapest (XI. ker)	Nyéki Imre uszoda	1957	
PVSK	Pécs	Abay Nemes Oszkár Sportuszoda	1997	
Szentes	Szentes	Dr. Rébeli Szabó József Sportuszoda	1934	
Szolnok	Szolnok	Tiszaligeti uszoda	1921	
TVSE	Tatabánya	Tatabányai Sportuszoda	1992	
UVSE	Budapest (IV. ker)	Hajós Alfréd Sportuszoda	2008	
Vasas	Budapest (XIII. ker)	Komjádi Béla Sportuszoda	1945	

=== Head coaches ===
Team	Head coach
AVUS	(Hungary) Márk Matajsz
BVSC	(Hungary) Levente Szűcs
Debrecen	(Serbia) Miroslav Bajin
Eger	(Hungary) Norbert Dabrowski
FTC	(Hungary) Zsolt Varga
Honvéd	(Hungary) András Merész
Kaposvár	(Hungary) József Berta
KSI	(Hungary) János Horváth
Miskolc	(Hungary) dr. József Sike
OSC	(Hungary) Lajos Vad
PVSK	(Hungary) Gergely Lukács
Szentes	(Hungary) Csaba Pellei
Szolnok	(Serbia) Živko Gocić
Tatabánya	(Hungary) Tamás Zantleitner
UVSE	(Hungary) Tibor Benedek
Vasas	(Hungary) László Földi (until 12 February 2019) (Hungary) Máté Bóbis (from 13 February 2019)

== Regular season ==
=== Group A ===
Pos	Team	Pld	W	D	L	GF	GA	GD	Pts	Qualification
1	FTC-Telekom Waterpolo	14	14	0	0	195	87	+108	42	Qualification for the Championship round
2	ZF-Eger	14	11	1	2	167	105	+62	34	Qualification for the Championship round
3	BVSC-Zugló MKB Euroleasing	14	6	3	5	137	128	+9	21	Qualification for the Championship round
4	Budapesti Honvéd SE	14	6	2	6	124	122	+2	20	Qualification for the Championship round
5	PVSK-Mecsek Füszért	24	6	1	17	125	133	−8	19	Qualification for the Relegation round
6	Metalcom Szentes	14	5	2	7	107	137	−30	17	Qualification for the Relegation round
7	AVUS Szombathely	14	3	1	10	113	161	−48	10	Qualification for the Relegation round
8	KSI SE	14	0	0	14	83	178	−95	0	Qualification for the Relegation round

==== Schedule and results ====
In the table below the home teams are listed on the left and the away teams along the top.

Home \ Away	AVUS	BHSE	BVSC	EGER	FTC	KSI	PVSK	SZEN
AVUS Szombathely		9–11	6–10	7–16	6–17	14–4	10–7	5–5
Bp. Honvéd SE	8–5		7–7	8–10	8–17	10–5	10–9	10–5
BVSC-Zugló	15–8	8–8		8–12	6–11	13–11	11–12	9–4
Egri VK	14–8	11–10	11–11		5–9	12–4	11–3	13–8
Ferencvárosi TC	16–6	13–4	14–6	13–8		17–6	15–9	16–5
KSI SE	9–13	5–14	5–12	5–15	6–13		4–12	7–10
Pécsi VSK	18–7	8–7	10–9	4–13	5–14	13–6		8–8
Szentesi VK	11–9	10–9	9–12	7–16	7–10	10–6	8–7	

Legend: Blue = home team win; Yellow = draw; Red = away team win.

=== Group B ===
Pos	Team	Pld	W	D	L	GF	GA	GD	Pts	Qualification
1	A-HÍD OSC Újbuda	14	14	0	0	207	82	+125	42	Qualification for the Championship round
2	Szolnoki Dózsa	14	11	0	3	166	89	+77	33	Qualification for the Championship round
3	PannErgy-Miskolci VLC	14	10	0	4	169	116	+53	30	Qualification for the Championship round
4	Debreceni VSE	14	6	0	8	129	154	−25	18	Qualification for the Championship round
5	Tatabányai VSE	14	4	1	9	95	139	−44	13	Qualification for the Relegation round
6	UVSE Hunguest Hotels	14	4	0	10	98	158	−60	12	Qualification for the Relegation round
7	VasasPlaket	14	3	2	9	107	160	−53	11	Qualification for the Relegation round
8	Kaposvári VK	14	2	1	11	95	168	−73	7	Qualification for the Relegation round

==== Schedule and results ====
In the table below the home teams are listed on the left and the away teams along the top.

Home \ Away	DVSE	KAP	MVLC	OSC	SZOL	TVSE	UVSE	VAS
Debreceni VSE		13–11	8–14	9–11	10–8	16–13	8–7	13–10
Kaposvári VK	8–11		4–14	4–17	4–12	8–9	8–7	7–7
Miskolci VLC	12–8	14–9		9–12	10–12	13–5	14–7	11–10
Orvosegyetem SC	16–6	21–3	14–11		8–7	14–3	12–3	18–6
Szolnoki Dózsa	17–5	13–2	11–8	8–10		9–4	17–8	16–6
Tatabányai VSE	8–7	7–4	5–11	4–15	4–11		9–10	10–6
UVSE	9–6	11–8	5–16	3–22	7–13	8–7		8–11
Vasas SC	10–9	12–15	6–12	6–17	3–12	7–7	7–5	

Legend: Blue = home team win; Yellow = draw; Red = away team win.

== Second round ==
=== Championship round ===
The top four teams, from two groups advance from the regular season. Teams start the Championship round with their points from the Regular season.

Pos	Team	Pld	W	D	L	GF	GA	GD	Pts	Qualification
1	FTC-Telekom Waterpolo	22	21	0	1	294	134	+160	63 (Note: FTC - OSC: 7–9; OSC - FTC: 8–13)	Qualification to 1st – 4th Placement matches
2	A-HÍD OSC Újbuda	22	21	0	1	294	153	+141	63	Qualification to 1st – 4th Placement matches
3	Szolnoki Dózsa	22	16	1	5	257	159	+98	49	Qualification to 1st – 4th Placement matches
4	ZF-Eger	22	14	2	6	237	186	+51	44	Qualification to 1st – 4th Placement matches
5	PannErgy-Miskolci VLC	22	12	2	8	244	189	+55	38	Qualification to 5th – 8th Placement matches
6	Budapesti Honvéd SE	22	8	3	11	175	203	−28	27	Qualification to 5th – 8th Placement matches
7	BVSC-Zugló MKB Euroleasing	22	7	4	11	211	221	−10	25	Qualification to 5th – 8th Placement matches
8	Debreceni VSE	22	8	0	14	197	253	−56	24	Qualification to 5th – 8th Placement matches

==== Schedule and results ====
Key numbers for pairing determination (number marks position after 14 games)

Rounds
15th	16th	17th	18th	19th	20th	21st	22nd
A1 - B4; B1 - A4; A2 - B3; B2 - A3	A1 - B2; B1 - A2; B4 - A3; A4 - B3	B3 - A1; A3 - B1; A2 - B4; B2 - A4	A1 - B1; A2 - B2; B3 - A3; B4 - A4	B4 - A1; A4 - B1; B3 - A2; A3 - B2	B2 - A1; A2 - B1; A3 - B4; B3 - A4	A1 - B3; B1 - A3; B4 - A2; A4 - B2	B1 - A1; B2 - A2; A3 - B3; A4 - B4

In the table below the home teams are listed on the left and the away teams along the top.

Home \ Away	BHSE	BVSC	DVSE	EGER	FTC	MVLC	OSC	SZOL
Bp. Honvéd SE			5–4			7–13	2–11	7–7
BVSC-Zugló			12–6			12–12	3–12	14–15
Debreceni VSE	13–12	9–6		11–12	9–16			
Egri VK			14–9			11–10	7–8	6–10
Ferencvárosi TC			22–7			10–7	7–9	10–8
Miskolci VLC	6–7	10–8		6–6	11–12			
Orvosegyetem SC	10–5	17–10		12–5	8–13			
Szolnoki Dózsa	17–6	12–9		15–9	7–9			

Legend: Blue = home team win; Yellow = draw; Red = away team win.

=== Relegation round ===
The bottom four teams, from two groups advance from the regular season. Teams start the Relegation round with their points from the Regular season.

Pos	Team	Pld	W	D	L	GF	GA	GD	Pts	Qualification
9	Metalcom Szentes	22	11	2	9	179	196	−17	35	Qualification to 9th – 12th Placement matches
10	PVSK-Mecsek Füszért	22	9	3	10	198	199	−1	30	Qualification to 9th – 12th Placement matches
11	Tatabányai VSE	22	9	2	11	168	207	−39	29	Qualification to 9th – 12th Placement matches
12	AVUS Szombathely	22	7	3	12	195	238	−43	24	Qualification to 9th – 12th Placement matches
13	UVSE Hunguest Hotels	22	7	2	13	171	229	−58	23	Qualification to 13th – 16th Placement matches
14	VasasPlaket	22	6	2	14	176	231	−55	20	Qualification to 13th – 16th Placement matches
15	Kaposvári VK	22	5	2	15	168	246	−78	17	Qualification to 13th – 16th Placement matches
16	KSI SE	22	1	0	21	144	264	−120	3	Qualification to 13th – 16th Placement matches

==== Schedule and results ====
In the table below the home teams are listed on the left and the away teams along the top.

Home \ Away	AVUS	KAP	KSI	PVSK	SZEN	TVSE	UVSE	VAS
AVUS Szombathely		14–10				8–10	11–11	14–13
Kaposvári VK	9–11		10–5	11–11	7–5			
KSI SE		12–14				10–8	5–10	8–12
Pécsi VSK		7–4				11–11	11–6	11–6
Szentesi VK		13–8				11–10	12–9	10–8
Tatabányai VSE	9–7		9–8	9–8	7–5			
UVSE	9–9		13–8	10–9	5–6			
Vasas SC	6–8		10–5	9–5	5–10			

Legend: Blue = home team win; Yellow = draw; Red = away team win.

== Final round ==
=== 1st – 4th Placement matches ===
Semi-finals

Team 1	Points	Team 2	Games in the season		Game 1	Game 2	Game 3
FTC-Telekom (1)	9–0	(4) ZF-Eger	13-8	9-5	11-9	／	／
A-HÍD OSC Újbuda (2)	9–0	(3) Szolnoki Dózsa	8-7	10-8	11-10	／	／

Game 1

1 May 2019; 20:15 (CEST)	Report	FTC-Telekom Waterpolo	11–9	ZF-Eger	Komjádi Béla Sportuszoda, Budapest; Attendance: 800; Referees: Rubos, Füzesi
1 May 2019; 20:15 (CEST)	Report	Score by quarters: 4-4, 3-0, 1-5, 3-0			Komjádi Béla Sportuszoda, Budapest; Attendance: 800; Referees: Rubos, Füzesi
1 May 2019; 20:15 (CEST)	Report	Kállay, Mitrović, Jakšić 2	Goals	Hosnyánszky 3	Komjádi Béla Sportuszoda, Budapest; Attendance: 800; Referees: Rubos, Füzesi

FTC-Telekom Waterpolo won the series 9–0 with points ratio, and advanced to the Finals.

1 May 2019; 19:00 (CEST)	Report	A-HÍD OSC Újbuda	11–10	Szolnoki Dózsa	Nyéki Imre uszoda, Budapest; Attendance: 800; Referees: Tóth, Homonnai
1 May 2019; 19:00 (CEST)	Report	Score by quarters: 2-2, 1-1, 3-3, 5-4			Nyéki Imre uszoda, Budapest; Attendance: 800; Referees: Tóth, Homonnai
1 May 2019; 19:00 (CEST)	Report	Hárai, Brguljan 3	Goals	four players 2	Nyéki Imre uszoda, Budapest; Attendance: 800; Referees: Tóth, Homonnai

A-HÍD OSC Újbuda won the series 9–0 with points ratio, and advanced to the Finals.

==== Finals ====
Higher ranked team hosted Game 1 and Game 3 plus Game 5 if necessary. The lower ranked hosted Game 2 plus Game 4 if necessary.

Team 1	Agg.	Team 2	Game 1	Game 2	Game 3	Game 4	Game 5
FTC-Telekom	3–0	A-HÍD OSC Újbuda	8-6	15-10	12-9 (p)	／	／

10 May 2019; 20:15 (CEST)	Report	FTC-Telekom Waterpolo	8–6	A-HÍD OSC Újbuda	Komjádi Béla Sportuszoda, Budapest; Attendance: 1,200; Referees: Tóth, Füzesi
10 May 2019; 20:15 (CEST)	Report	Score by quarters: 1-1, 3-2, 2-2, 2-1			Komjádi Béla Sportuszoda, Budapest; Attendance: 1,200; Referees: Tóth, Füzesi
10 May 2019; 20:15 (CEST)	Report	Vámos 3	Goals	Erdélyi 2	Komjádi Béla Sportuszoda, Budapest; Attendance: 1,200; Referees: Tóth, Füzesi

18 May 2019; 13:45 (CEST)	Report	A-HÍD OSC Újbuda	10–15	FTC-Telekom Waterpolo	Nyéki Imre uszoda, Budapest; Attendance: 850; Referees: Rubos, Homonnai
18 May 2019; 13:45 (CEST)	Report	Score by quarters: 2-5, 2-3, 3-1, 3-6			Nyéki Imre uszoda, Budapest; Attendance: 850; Referees: Rubos, Homonnai
18 May 2019; 13:45 (CEST)	Report	Ukropina 4	Goals	six players 2	Nyéki Imre uszoda, Budapest; Attendance: 850; Referees: Rubos, Homonnai

22 May 2019; 19:00 (CEST)	Report	FTC-Telekom Waterpolo	8–8 ^{(4–1 PSO)} (PSO)	A-HÍD OSC Újbuda	Komjádi Béla Sportuszoda, Budapest; Attendance: 1,600; Referees: Marjay, Kun
22 May 2019; 19:00 (CEST)	Report	Score by quarters: 1-2, 3-3, 2-1, 2-2 PSO: 4–1			Komjádi Béla Sportuszoda, Budapest; Attendance: 1,600; Referees: Marjay, Kun
22 May 2019; 19:00 (CEST)	Report	Varga 5	Goals	Manhercz 3	Komjádi Béla Sportuszoda, Budapest; Attendance: 1,600; Referees: Marjay, Kun

FTC-Telekom Waterpolo won the Final series 3–0.

2018–19 Országos Bajnokság I
Champion

23rd title

==== Third place ====
Higher ranked team hosted Game 1 plus Game 3 if necessary. The lower ranked hosted Game 2.

Team 1	Agg.	Team 2	Game 1	Game 2	Game 3
Szolnoki Dózsa	2–0	ZF-Eger	10-7	13-7	／

12 May 2019; 18:00 (CEST)	Report	Szolnoki Dózsa	10–7	ZF-Eger	Tiszaligeti uszoda, Szolnok; Attendance: 500; Referees: Homonnai, Várkonyi
12 May 2019; 18:00 (CEST)	Report	Score by quarters: 3-3, 1-1, 2-2, 4-1			Tiszaligeti uszoda, Szolnok; Attendance: 500; Referees: Homonnai, Várkonyi
12 May 2019; 18:00 (CEST)	Report	Bátori, Aleksić, Prlainović 2	Goals	Vlachopoulos 4	Tiszaligeti uszoda, Szolnok; Attendance: 500; Referees: Homonnai, Várkonyi

17 May 2019; 19:00 (CEST)	Report	ZF-Eger	7–13	Szolnoki Dózsa	Bitskey Aladár uszoda, Eger; Attendance: 900; Referees: Vogel, Marnitz
17 May 2019; 19:00 (CEST)	Report	Score by quarters: 1-2, 3-3, 1-4, 2-4			Bitskey Aladár uszoda, Eger; Attendance: 900; Referees: Vogel, Marnitz
17 May 2019; 19:00 (CEST)	Report	Vlachopoulos 4	Goals	Prlainović 4	Bitskey Aladár uszoda, Eger; Attendance: 900; Referees: Vogel, Marnitz

Szolnoki Dózsa won the Third place.

=== 5th – 8th Placement matches ===
Team 1	Points	Team 2	Games in the season		Game 1	Game 2	Game 3
PannErgy-Miskolci VLC (5)	9–0	(8) Debreceni VSE	12-8	14-8	14-7	／	／
Budapesti Honvéd SE (6)	5–8	(7) BVSC-Zugló MKB Euroleasing	7-7	8-8	8-11	12-10	5-7

Fifth place game (European competition play-off)

Higher ranked team hosted Game 1 plus Game 3 if necessary. The lower ranked hosted Game 2.

Team 1	Agg.	Team 2	Game 1	Game 2	Game 3
PannErgy-Miskolci VLC	2–1	BVSC-Zugló MKB Euroleasing	11-6	9-8	6-2

Seventh place game

Higher ranked team hosted Game 1 plus Game 3 if necessary. The lower ranked hosted Game 2.

Team 1	Agg.	Team 2	Game 1	Game 2	Game 3
Budapesti Honvéd SE	2–1	Debreceni VSE	14-13	12-13 (p)	13-9

=== 9th – 12th Placement matches ===
Team 1	Points	Team 2	Games in the season		Game 1	Game 2	Game 3
Metalcom Szentes (9)	7–1	(12) AVUS Szombathely	11-9	5-5	12-11	／	／
PVSK-Mecsek Füszért (10)	7–4	(11) Tatabányai VSE	11-11	8-9	11-8	7-5	／

Ninth place game

Higher ranked team hosted Game 1 plus Game 3 if necessary. The lower ranked hosted Game 2.

Team 1	Agg.	Team 2	Game 1	Game 2	Game 3
Metalcom Szentes	0–2	PVSK-Mecsek Füszért	10-12	6-7	／

Eleventh place game

Higher ranked team hosted Game 1 plus Game 3 if necessary. The lower ranked hosted Game 2.

Team 1	Agg.	Team 2	Game 1	Game 2	Game 3
Tatabányai VSE	2–1	AVUS Szombathely	11-10	8-10	11-9

=== 13th – 16th Placement matches ===
Team 1	Points	Team 2	Games in the season		Game 1	Game 2	Game 3
UVSE Hunguest Hotels (13)	9–0	(16) KSI SE	13-8	10-5	12-5	／	／
VasasPlaket (14)	4–7	(15) Kaposvári VK	12-15	7-7	12-7	7-8	／

Thirteenth place game

Higher ranked team hosted Game 1 plus Game 3 if necessary. The lower ranked hosted Game 2.

Team 1	Agg.	Team 2	Game 1	Game 2	Game 3
UVSE Hunguest Hotels	2–0	Kaposvári VK	12-4	9-8	／

Fifteenth place game (Relegation play-out)

Higher ranked team hosted Game 1 plus Game 3 if necessary. The lower ranked hosted Game 2.

Team 1	Agg.	Team 2	Game 1	Game 2	Game 3
VasasPlaket	2–0	KSI SE	8-5	11-10	／

== Season statistics ==
=== Top goalscorers ===
As of 24 May 2019.

Rank	Player	Team	Goals
1	(Hungary) Marcell Kolozsi	Tatabánya	55
2	(Hungary) Mátyás Pásztor	BVSC	52
2	(Serbia) Ognjen Stojanović	MVLC	52
4	(Hungary) Márton Nagy	Szentes	51
5	(United States) Alex Bowen	MVLC	50
5	(Greece) Angelos Vlachopoulos	Eger	50
7	(Hungary) Botond Bóbis	KSI	49
7	(Serbia) Ivan Basara	AVUS	49
9	(Serbia) Zlatko Rakonjać	PVSK	48
9	(Hungary) Benedek Baksa	UVSE	47

=== Points classification ===
As of 27 May 2019.

Rank	Player	Team	Rating
1	(Montenegro) Saša Mišić	MVLC	66.1
2	(Hungary) Balázs Szirányi	Honvéd	60.0
3	(Greece) Angelos Vlachopoulos	Eger	59.5
4	(Hungary) Viktor Vadovics	MVLC	53.0
5	(Slovakia) Lukáš Ďurík	DVSE	52.3
6	(Hungary) Viktor Vörös	Szentes	52.0
7	(Australia) Aaron Younger	FTC	51.9
8	(Montenegro) Nikola Murišić	Eger	49.7
9	(Hungary) Norbert Hosnyánszky	Eger	48.9
10	(Serbia) Ognjen Stojanović	MVLC	48.6

== Final standing ==
Pos	Team	Qualification or Relegation
1st place, gold medalist(s)	FTC-Telekom Waterpolo	Qualification to Champions League preliminary round
2nd place, silver medalist(s)	A-HÍD OSC Újbuda	Qualification to Champions League second qualifying round
3rd place, bronze medalist(s)	Szolnoki Dózsa	Qualification to Champions League preliminary round*
4	ZF-Eger	Qualification to Euro Cup first qualifying round
5	PannErgy-Miskolci VLC	Qualification to Euro Cup first qualifying round
6	BVSC-Zugló MKB Euroleasing	
7	Budapesti Honvéd SE	
8	Debreceni VSE	
9	Metalcom Szentes	
10	PVSK-Mecsek Füszért	
11	Tatabányai VSE	
12	AVUS Szombathely	
13	UVSE Hunguest Hotels	
14	Kaposvári VK	
15	VasasPlaket	Qualification to relegation play-out
16	KSI SE	Relegation to Országos Bajnokság I/B

== Relegation play-out ==
Higher ranked team hosted Game 1 plus Game 3 if necessary. The lower ranked hosted Game 2.

Team 1	Agg.	Team 2	Game 1	Game 2	Game 3
VasasPlaket (I)	2–0	(I/B) Kanizsa VSE	14-8	13-7	／

VasasPlaket won the 2–0 on series and therefore both clubs remain in their respective leagues.

== See also ==
- 2018 Magyar Kupa (National Cup of Hungary)
- 2018 Szuperkupa (Super Cup of Hungary)
