= Szilárd Jansik =

Hungarian water polo player

Jansik Szilárd
Personal information
- Nationality: Hungarian
- Born: 6 April 1994 (age 32) Cegléd, Hungary
- Height: 193 cm (76 in)
- Weight: 95 kg (209 lb)

Sport
- Sport: Water polo
- Handedness: Right
- Current club: Ferencváros

Senior clubs
- Years: Team
- –2013: KSI
- 2012–2013: Hungary junior
- 2013–2014: Szeged
- 2014–present: Ferencváros
National team
- Years: Team
- –: Hungary
Medal record
Men's water polo
Representing Hungary
Olympic Games
Bronze medal – third place	2020 Tokyo	Team
World Championships
Gold medal – first place	2023 Fukuoka	Team
World Cup
Silver medal – second place	2026 Sydney
European Championship
Silver medal – second place	2022 Split
Silver medal – second place	2026 Belgrade
- Updated on 1 August 2023

Szilárd Jansik (born 6 April 1994) is a Hungarian professional water polo player for Ferencváros, and the captain of the Hungarian national team. He competed in the 2020 Summer Olympics and the 2024 Summer Olympics.

== Achievements ==
- Országos Bajnokság:
  - (gold) 2018, 2019, 2022, 2023
- Magyar Kupa:
  - (gold) 2021, 2022, 2023
- LEN Champions League:
  - (gold) 2019, 2024
- LEN Euro Cup:
  - (gold) 2017, 2018
- LEN Super Cup:
  - (gold) 2018, 2019

== Individual awards ==
- Hungarian Water Polo Player of the Year: 2022
- Most Valuable Player of the European Championship: 2022
