= Tatabányai Vízmű SE =

Hungarian water polo club

Tatabányai Vízmű Sportegyesület
- Founded: 1910
- League: OB I
- Based in: Tatabánya, Hungary
- Arena: Tatabányai Sportuszoda
- Colors
- President: Zoltán Kovácshegyi
- Head coach: Tamás Zantleitner
- Website: tatabanyavizilabda.hu

Tatabányai Vízmű Sportegyesület is a water polo club from Tatabánya, Hungary. The team competes in the Országos Bajnokság I.

== Current team ==
Season 2016–2017

| No. | Nat. | Player | Birth |
Goalkeeper (kapus)
| 1 | (Hungary) | **Gábor Jászberényi** |
| 14 | (Hungary) | István Csongár | 14 December 1992 (age 33) |

Bold: senior national team possess

Squad for the 2015–16 season
| # | Name | Position | Date of birth |
|---|---|---|---|
| 1 | (Serbia) Stefan Živojinović | Goalkeeper | 8 July 1988 (age 37) |
| 2 | (Hungary) András Garancsy | | 20 November 1995 (age 30) |
| 3 | (Hungary) Máthé Balázs | | 27 March 1986 (age 40) |
| 4 | (Hungary) Attila Salamon | | 7 March 1994 (age 32) |
| 5 | (Hungary) Dániel Francsics | | 20 November 1993 (age 32) |
| 6 | (Hungary) Tamás Békés | | 29 September 1979 (age 46) |
| 7 | (Hungary) Gergely Dobay | | 21 July 1992 (age 33) |
| 8 | (Hungary) Áron Regős | | 6 April 1975 (age 51) |
| 9 | (Hungary) Máté Mocsári | | 15 May 1992 (age 34) |
| 10 | (Hungary) Szabolcs Kiss | | 24 July 1979 (age 46) |
| 11 | (Hungary) Balázs Sebestyén | | 22 March 1998 (age 28) |
| 12 | (Hungary) Károly Práczky | | 2 September 1994 (age 31) |
| 13 | (Hungary) Roland Tatár | | 4 February 1991 (age 35) |
Coach : (Hungary) Tamás Zantleitner

=== Technical staff ===
- (Hungary) Head coach: Tamás Zantleitner

=== Squad changes for the 2015-16 season ===
In

- (Hungary) Dániel Francsics ( from PVSK )
- (Hungary) Károly Práczky ( from PVSK )
- (Hungary) László Jakab ( from MVLC )
- (Hungary) Attila Salamon ( from MVLC )
- (Hungary) Roland Tatár ( from BVSC )
- (Hungary) Áron Regős ( from Ferencváros )
- (Serbia) Stefan Živojinović ( from (Serbia) Radnički )
- (Hungary) Máthé Balázs ( from )

Out

== Recent seasons ==
As of 18 May 2018.

=== Rankings in OB I ===
| P. | 16 | 17 | 18 | 19 |
|---|---|---|---|---|
| 1 | | | | |
| 2 | | | | |
| 3 | | | | |
| 4 | | | | |
| 5 | | | | |
| 6 | | | | |
| 7 | | | | |
| 8 | | | | |
| 9 | | | | |
| 10 | | | | |
| 11 | | | | |
| 12 | | | | |
| 13 | | | | |
| 14 | | 14 | 14 | |
| 15 | 15 | | | |

== Coaches ==
- (Hungary) Tamás Zantleitner (2015 – present)
