= 2021 Magyar Kupa (men's water polo) =

2021 BENU Magyar Kupa
Tournament details
- Country: Hungary
- City: Sopron
- Venue(s): Lőver Pool
- Dates: 10–11 December 2021
- Teams: 16
- Defending champions: FTC-Telekom

Final positions
- Champions: FTC-Telekom (21st title)
- Runner-up: Szolnoki Dózsa
- Semifinalists: A-Híd VasasPlaket; OSC-Újbuda

Tournament statistics
- Scoring leader(s): Márton Vámos (15 goals)
- Sponsored name, referring to BENU.

The 2021 Magyar Kupa (English: Hungarian Cup) is the 95th season of Hungary's annual knock-out cup water polo competition. The title holders were FTC-Telekom by winning the 2020 Magyar Kupa Final.

== Final four ==
The final four was held on 10–11 December 2021 at the Lőver Pool in Sopron.

Semifinals
10 December, 18:00
FTC-Telekom	14
A-Híd VasasPlaket	10
10 December, 20:00
OSC Újbuda	11
Szolnoki Dózsa	15

Final
11 December, 14:00
FTC-Telekom	12
Szolnoki Dózsa	9

10 December 2021; 18:00	Report	FTC-Telekom	14–10	A-Híd VasasPlaket	Lőver Pool, Sopron; Referees: Csanádi, Kenéz
10 December 2021; 18:00	Report	Score by quarters: 2–3, 4–2, 4–2, 4–3			Lőver Pool, Sopron; Referees: Csanádi, Kenéz
10 December 2021; 18:00	Report	Pohl, Vámos 3	Goals	Bedő 3	Lőver Pool, Sopron; Referees: Csanádi, Kenéz

9 December 2022; 20:00	Report	OSC Újbuda	11–15	Szolnoki Dózsa	Lőver Pool, Sopron; Referees: Tóth, Kovács Cs.
9 December 2022; 20:00	Report	Score by quarters: 3–2, 1–5, 6–4, 1–4			Lőver Pool, Sopron; Referees: Tóth, Kovács Cs.
9 December 2022; 20:00	Report	three players 2	Goals	Nagy 5	Lőver Pool, Sopron; Referees: Tóth, Kovács Cs.

=== Final ===
11 December 2021; 14:00	Report	FTC-Telekom	12–9	Szolnoki Dózsa	Lőver Pool, Sopron; Referees: Kun, Marjay
11 December 2021; 14:00	Report	Score by quarters: 3–3, 3–2, 1–2, 5–2			Lőver Pool, Sopron; Referees: Kun, Marjay
11 December 2021; 14:00	Report	Vámos 3	Goals	Schmölcz, Zović 2	Lőver Pool, Sopron; Referees: Kun, Marjay

==== Final standings ====
	Team
	FTC-Telekom
Silver medal	Szolnoki Dózsa
Bronze medal	A-Híd VasasPlaket
Bronze medal	OSC Újbuda

2021 Magyar Kupa champions
FTC-Telekom
21st title

== See also ==
- 2021–22 Országos Bajnokság I
