= Diapolo =

Hungarian clothing company

Diapolo Hungária Kft.
- Company type: Private
- Industry: Textiles, Apparel
- Founded: 1997; 29 years ago
- Headquarters: Budapest, Hungary
- Area served: Europe, Worldwide
- Key people: Zoltán Megyesi, (CEO)
- Products: Swimwear, Sportswear
- Website: www.diapolo.eu

Diapolo is a Hungarian clothing company specializing in swimwear for water polo, swimming and recreation for men and women. The name is a combination of the words diablo (meaning devil in Spanish) and polo (as in water polo). Their "dp" logo also feature a pair of devil horns and a pitchfork.

== History ==
Diapolo is established by Hungarian businessman dr. Zoltán Megyesi. The company was founded in 1997.

== Water polo sponsorships ==
Teams using Diapolo equipment are;

National teams

- France men's and women's team
- (Georgia (country)) Georgia men's and women's team
- Greece men's team
- Costa Rica men's team - from 2021
- Hungarian Water Polo Federation (Hungary men's and women's team) - from 2013
- Slovakia men's team

Club teams

- (Croatia) Jug Dubrovnik
- (Denmark) FREM
- (Germany) ASV Aachen (swimming)
- (Germany) Poseidon Hamburg (swimming)
- (Germany) Laatzen (swimming)
- (Germany) LSN (swimming)
- (Germany) Leimen-Mannheim
- (Germany) OSC Potsdam
- (Germany) Waspo Hannover
- (Germany) White Sharks Hannover
- (Hungary) AVUS Szombathely
- (Hungary) Debreceni VSE
- (Hungary) BVSC-Zugló
- (Hungary) Ferencváros - from 2018/19
- (Hungary) Bp. Honvéd
- (Hungary) KSI
- (Hungary) Miskolci VLC
- (Hungary) OSC Újbuda
- (Hungary) Pécsi VSK
- (Hungary) Szegedi VE
- (Hungary) UVSE
- (Hungary) Vasas
- (United States) Colorado
- (Austria) Wiener Sport-Club (water polo)

== See also ==
- List of swimwear brands
