= Márton Vámos =

Hungarian water polo player

Personal information
- Nationality: Hungarian
- Born: 24 June 1992 (age 34) Budapest, Hungary
- Height: 1.99 m (6 ft 6 in)

Sport
- Sport: Water polo
- Handedness: Left
- Position: Right Wing/ Right Drive
- Current club: Ferencváros

Youth career
- Years: Team
- –: KSI

Senior clubs
- Years: Team
- –2010: KSI
- 2010–2013: Vasas
- 2013–2017: Szolnok
- 2017–2022: Ferencváros
- 2022–2024: Olympiacos
- 2024–: Ferencváros
National team
- Years: Team
- 2009–: Hungary
Medal record
Men's water polo
Representing Hungary
Olympic Games
Bronze medal – third place	2020 Tokyo	Team
World Championships
Gold medal – first place	2013 Barcelona	Team
Gold medal – first place	2023 Fukuoka	Team
Silver medal – second place	2017 Budapest	Team
Silver medal – second place	2025 Singapore	Team
European Championships
Gold medal – first place	2020 Budapest
Silver medal – second place	2014 Budapest
Bronze medal – third place	2016 Belgrade
FINA World League
Silver medal – second place	2014 Dubai
Silver medal – second place	2018 Budapest
World Cup
Gold medal – first place	2018 Berlin
Silver medal – second place	2014 Kazakhstan

Márton György Vámos (born 24 June 1992) is a Hungarian water polo player. He was part of the Hungarian team at the 2015 World Aquatics Championships.

== Honours ==
=== National ===
- World Championships: Gold medal - 2013; 2023; Silver medal - 2017
- European Championship: Silver medal - 2014; Bronze medal - 2016
- FINA World League: Silver medal - 2014; 2018

=== Club ===
Vasas

- Hungarian Championship : 2011–12

Szolnok

- LEN Champions League: 2016–17
- LEN Super Cup: 2017
- Hungarian Championship: 2014–15, 2015–16, 2016–17
- Hungarian Cup: 2014, 2016
- Hungarian Super Cup: 2017

Ferencváros

- LEN Champions League: 2018–19; runners-up: 2020–21
- LEN Euro Cup: 2017–18
- LEN Super Cup: 2018, 2019
- Hungarian Championship: 2017–18, 2018–19, 2021–22
- Hungarian Cup: 2018, 2019, 2020, 2021

Olympiacos

- Greek Championship: 2022–23
- Greek Cup: 2022–23, 2023–24

== Awards ==
- Swimming World Magazine's man water polo ''World Player of the Year " award: 2017
- Member of the World Team by total-waterpolo: 2017
- LEN Champions League Right Winger of the Year: 2016–17, 2018–19
- Hungarian Water Polo Player of the Year: 2017
- World Championship MVP: 2017 Budapest
- 2017 World Championship Team of the Tournament
- Hungarian Championship MVP: 2017–18
- Hungarian Championship Right Wing of the Year: 2011–12, 2014–15, 2015–16, 2016–17, 2017–18, 2018–19, 2021–22
- Greek Championship Right Wing of the Year: 2022–23
- World League MVP: 2018 Budapest
- Youth World Championship MVP: 2011 Volos
- Szalay Iván díj (2010)

== See also ==
- List of world champions in men's water polo
- List of World Aquatics Championships medalists in water polo

Awards
Preceded by (Serbia) Duško Pijetlović	Most Valuable Player of Water Polo World Championship; 2017	Succeeded by (Italy) Francesco Di Fulvio
Preceded by (Serbia) Filip Filipović	Swimming World Magazine; Water Polo Player of the Year; 2017	Succeeded by (Montenegro) Aleksandar Ivović
