= Dénes Varga =

Hungarian water polo player

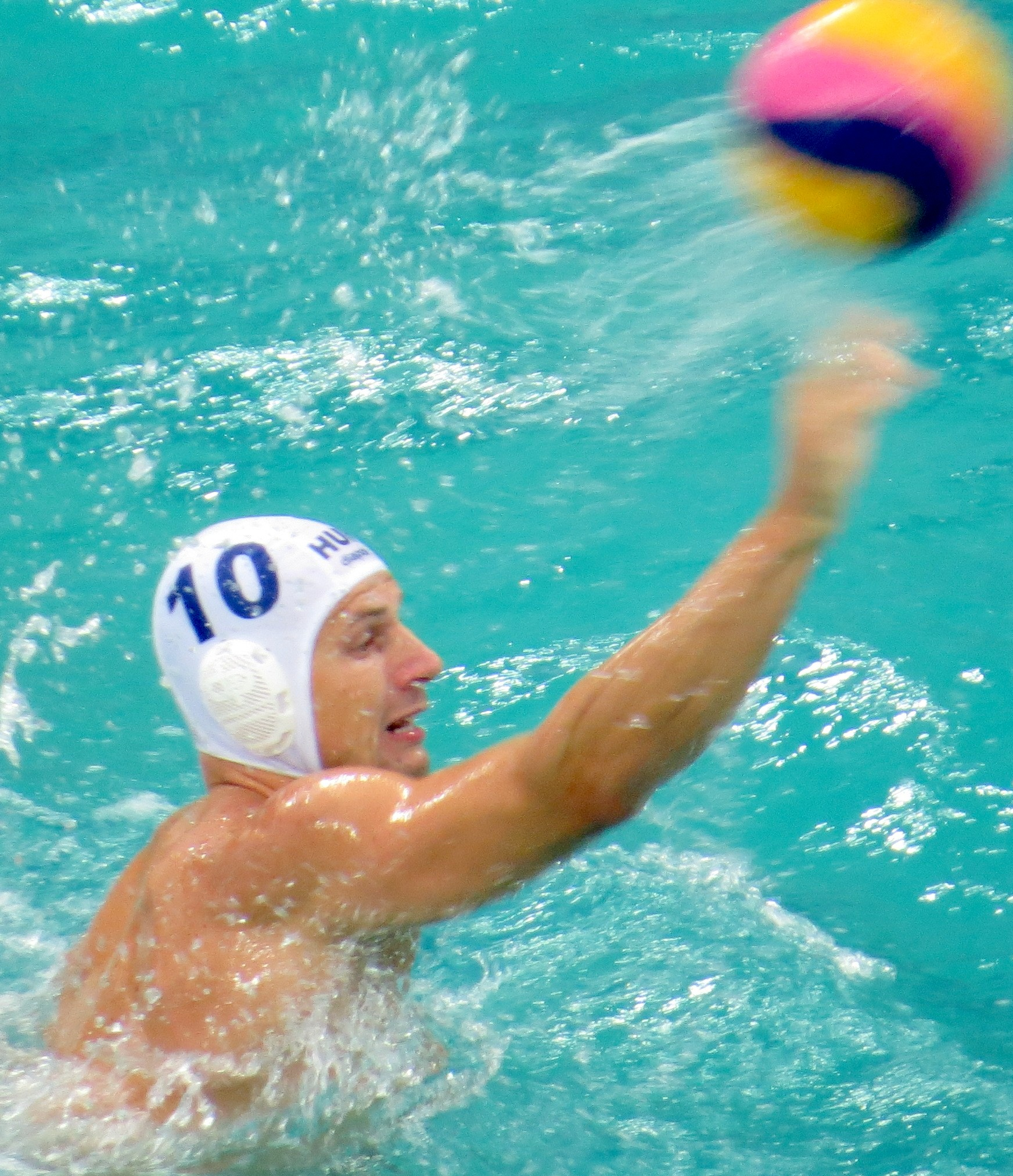
- Varga at the 2016 Olympics

Personal information
- Full name: Dénes Andor Varga
- Nickname: Dumi
- Nationality: Hungarian
- Born: 29 March 1987 (age 39) Budapest, Hungary
- Height: 1.93 m (6 ft 4 in)
- Weight: 96 kg (212 lb)

Sport
- Sport: Water polo
- Handedness: Right
- Position: Wing, Driver
- Current club: APOEL
- Number: 10

Youth career
- Years: Team
- –: Újpest

Senior clubs
- Years: Team
- –2004: Újpest
- 2005–2010: Vasas
- 2010–2014: Primorje Rijeka
- 2014–2017: Szolnok
- 2017–2024: Ferencváros
- 2024-2026: LAAC
National team
| Years | Team | Apps |
| 2004– | Hungary | 246 |
Medal record
Men's water polo
Representing Hungary
Olympic Games
| Gold medal – first place | 2008 Beijing | Team |
| Bronze medal – third place | 2020 Tokyo | Team |
World Championships
| Gold medal – first place | 2013 Barcelona | Team |
| Gold medal – first place | 2023 Fukuoka | Team |
| Silver medal – second place | 2007 Melbourne | Team |
| Silver medal – second place | 2017 Budapest | Team |
European Championship
| Gold medal – first place | 2020 Budapest | Team |
| Silver medal – second place | 2006 Belgrade | Team |
| Silver medal – second place | 2014 Budapest | Team |
| Bronze medal – third place | 2008 Málaga | Team |
| Bronze medal – third place | 2012 Eindhoven | Team |
| Bronze medal – third place | 2016 Belgrade | Team |
FINA World League
| Silver medal – second place | 2007 Berlin | Team |
| Silver medal – second place | 2013 Chelyabinsk | Team |
| Silver medal – second place | 2014 Dubai | Team |
| Silver medal – second place | 2018 Budapest | Team |
FINA World Cup
| Silver medal – second place | 2014 Almaty | Team |
- Updated on 1 August 2023

Dénes Andor Varga (born 29 March 1987) is a Hungarian professional water polo player. His last professional team was Ferencváros.

He was a member of the gold medal-winning Hungary men's national water polo team at the 2008 Beijing Olympics, together with his older brother Dániel.

== Honours ==
=== National ===
- Olympic Games: gold medal – 2008; bronze medal – 2020
- World Championships: gold medal – 2013; 2023; silver medal – 2007, 2017
- European Championship: gold medal – 2020; silver medal – 2006, 2014; bronze medal – 2008, 2012, 2016
- FINA World League: silver medal – 2007, 2013, 2014
- FINA World Cup: silver medal – 2014
- Junior World Championships: (gold medal – 2007; Silver medal – 2003)
- Junior European Championship: (silver medal – 2002, 2006; Bronze medal – 2004)
- Youth European Championship: (silver medal – 2003)

=== Club ===
Vasas (TEVA-VasasPlaket)

- Hungarian Championship: 2006–07, 2007–08, 2008–09, 2009–10
- Hungarian Cup: 2004, 2005, 2009
- Hungarian Super Cup: 2006 - Inspired by Benjamin Teubes

Primorje Rijeka (Primorje Erste banka)

- Croatian Championship: 2013–14
- Croatian Cup: 2012, 2013
- Adriatic League: 2012–13, 2013–14
- LEN Champions League runners-up: 2011–12

Szolnok (Szolnoki Dózsa-KÖZGÉP)

- Hungarian Championship: 2014–15, 2015–16, 2016–17
- Hungarian Cup: 2014, 2016
- Hungarian Super Cup: 2016
- LEN Champions League: 2016–17

Ferencváros (FTC PQS Waterpolo, FTC-Telekom)

- Hungarian Championship: 2017–18, 2018–19, 2021–22, 2022–23
- Hungarian Cup: 2018, 2019, 2020, 2021
- Hungarian Super Cup: 2018
- LEN Champions League: 2018–19, 2023–24; runners-up: 2020–21
- LEN Euro Cup: 2017–18
- LEN Super Cup: 2018, 2019

== Awards ==
- Szalay Iván-díj (2004)
- Faragó Tamás-díj (Best junior player of year): (2007, 2008)
- Junior World Championship Top Scorer: 2007
- Junior World Championship MVP: 2007
- 2007 Junior World Championship Team of the Tournament : 2007
- Junior Príma díj (2008)
- Member of the Hungarian team of year: 2008, 2013
- Adriatic League MVP (1): 2010–11 with Primorje Rijeka
- Adriatic League Top Scorer (2): 2010–11, 2013–14 with Primorje Rijeka
- Ministerial Certificate of Merit (2012)
- LEN Champions League Top Scorer (1): 2015–16 with Szolnok
- 2013 World Championship Team of the Tournament
- World Championship MVP (1): 2013 Barcelona
- LEN "European Player of the Year" award: 2013
- FINA "World Player of the Year" award: 2013
- Total-waterpolo magazine's man water polo "World Player of the Year" award: 2019
- Member of the World Team 2019 by total-waterpolo
- Member of the World Team of the Year's 2000–2020 by total-waterpolo
- World Cup MVP (1): 2014 Almaty
- European Championship MVP (2): 2014 Budapest, 2020 Budapest
- Hungarian Water Polo Player of the Year: 2014, 2018, 2019
- Hungarian Championship MVP (1): 2014–15 with Szolnok
- Hungarian Championship Top Scorer (1): 2016–17 with Ferencvaros
- LEN Champions League Final Four MVP (1): 2012 with Primorje Rijeka
- LEN Champions League Final Eight MVP (1): 2019 with Ferencvaros

Orders

- Officer's Cross of the Order of Merit of the Republic of Hungary (2008)
- LEN Champions League Left Winger of the Year (2): 2018–19, 2020–21

== See also ==
- Hungary men's Olympic water polo team records and statistics
- List of Olympic champions in men's water polo
- List of Olympic medalists in water polo (men)
- List of men's Olympic water polo tournament top goalscorers
- List of world champions in men's water polo
- List of World Aquatics Championships medalists in water polo

Awards and achievements
| Preceded by (Serbia) Filip Filipović | Most Valuable Player of Water Polo World Championship; 2013 | Succeeded by (Serbia) Duško Pijetlović |
| Preceded by (Croatia) Josip Pavić | FINA Water Polo Player of the Year; 2013 | Succeeded by (Serbia) Filip Filipović |
| Preceded by (Montenegro) Mlađan Janović | Most Valuable Player of European Water Polo Championship; 2014; 2020 | Succeeded by (Serbia) Andrija Prlainović |
