= Miskolci VLC =

Hungarian water polo club

PannErgy-MVLC Miskolc
- Full name: Miskolci Vizilabda Club
- Short name: MVLC, Miskolc
- Founded: 27 April 2012; 14 years ago
- League: Országos Bajnokság I
- Based in: Miskolc, Hungary
- Arena: Kemény Dénes Sportuszoda
- Colors: Red and white
- President: András Bachner
- Head coach: Kristóf Kemény
- 2021–22: Országos Bajnokság I, 11th of 14
- Website: mvlc.hu

Miskolci Vizilabda Club is a water polo club from Miskolc, Hungary. The team competes in the Országos Bajnokság I.

== Current squad ==
Season 2022–23

No.	Nat.	Player	Birth Date	Position	L/R
1	(Hungary)	Moravcsik Martin	December 28, 1996 (age 29)	Goalkeeper	
2	(Hungary)	Balázs Gergő Smitula	April 2, 1996 (age 30)	Centre back	R
3	(Hungary)	Oltean Sebastian Stefan	September 3, 2001 (age 24)	Driver	R
4	(Hungary)	Robert Krasznai Bendegúz	March 19, 2002 (age 24)	Driver	R
5	(Hungary)	Balázs Boldizsár Molnár	July 8, 2004 (age 21)	Driver	R
6	(Hungary)	Imre Norbert Nagy	February 1, 2003 (age 23)	Centre forward	R
7	(Hungary)	Gergely Molnár	March 22, 2001 (age 25)	Driver	R
8	(Hungary)	Marcell Böröczky	May 16, 2002 (age 24)	Driver	L
9	(Hungary)	Tamás Tanzer	March 12, 1999 (age 27)	Centre back	R
10	(Hungary)	Ádám Várkonyi	March 29, 2002 (age 24)	Driver	R
11	(Brazil)	Gomes Lacerda Felipe Henrique	July 7, 2002 (age 23)	Driver	R
12	(Montenegro)	Nikola Brkić	September 1, 1998 (age 27)	Driver	R
13	(Hungary)	Levente Stefanidesz	September 1, 1997 (age 28)	Deiver	R
14	(Hungary)	Zsombor Bogos	January 19, 2001 (age 25)	Goalkeeper	
	(Serbia)	Nikolov Nikola	February 7, 1994 (age 32)	Centre forward	R
	(Montenegro)	Stefan Porobic	January 18, 1996 (age 30)	Driver	R

=== Staff ===
Technical Staff
Chairman	(Hungary) András Bachner
Manager	(Hungary) Gyula Takács
Head Coach	(Hungary) Vidumansky Ladislav

=== Transfers (2022-23) ===
In:

- (Montenegro) Nikola Brkić (from ANO Glyfada)
- (Montenegro) Stefan Porobić (from VK Valis Valjevo)
- (Serbia) Nikolov Nikola (from VK Vojvodina)

Out:

- (Slovakia) Lukáš Seman (to VK Crvena zvezda)

== Keret ==
2018–19-es szezon

№	Nemzetiség	Játékos	Születési idő	Poszt	L/R
1	(Hungary)	Kristóf Csoma	January 26, 1992 (age 34)	Kapus	
2	(Montenegro)	Sasa Misić	March 27, 1987 (age 39)	Center	
3	(Serbia)	Miloš Miličić	May 10, 1991 (age 35)		
4	(United States)	Alex Bowen	September 4, 1993 (age 32)		
5	(Hungary)	Viktor Vadovics	June 24, 1998 (age 27)		
6	(Hungary)	Ádám Nagy	May 19, 1998 (age 28)	Bekk	
7	(Hungary)	Olivér Hornyák	April 7, 1996 (age 30)		
8	(Hungary)	Botond Vismeg	March 14, 2003 (age 23)		
9	(Hungary)	Zsombor Vismeg	October 29, 2000 (age 25)		
10	(Hungary)	Sisán Balázs	September 12, 2000 (age 25)		
11	(Hungary)	Lőrincz Bálint	March 10, 1994 (age 32)		
12	(Hungary)	Krisztián Bedő	May 4, 1993 (age 33)	Center	
13	(Hungary)	Szőke Szabolcs	September 1, 1989 (age 36)		
14	(Hungary)	Mizsei Márton	November 1, 1999 (age 26)	Kapus	
15	(Hungary)	Ognjen Stojanović	April 27, 1996 (age 30)		
16	(Hungary)	Bojan Banićević	September 3, 1993 (age 32)		

Szakmai stáb
Vezetőedző	(Hungary) Dr. Sike József
Másodedző	(Hungary) ??

=== Átigazolások (2018-19) ===
Érkezők:

- (Hungary) Lőrincz Bálint (ZF-Eger-től)
- (Hungary) Bedő Krisztián (ZF-Eger-től)
- (Serbia) Ognjen Stojanović (VK Crvena zvezda-tól)
- (Montenegro) Bojan Banićević (PVK Jadran Herceg Novi-tól)
- (Hungary) Szőke Szabolcs (Debreceni VSE-től)
- (Hungary) Mizsei Márton (BVSC-Zugló II-től)

Távozók:

- (Belarus) Kuzmenko Aleksey (Metalcom Szentes-hez)
- (Hungary) Lukács Dénes Dorián (ZF-Eger-hez)
- (Hungary) Sánta Dániel (ZF-Eger-hez)
- (Hungary) Jakab Dániel (PVSK-Mecsek Füszért-hez)
- (Hungary) Berta József (Kaposvári VK-hoz)
- (Hungary) Halek Márton (VasasPlaket-hez)
- (Hungary) Kósik Soma (Debreceni VSE-hez)

Season 2017–18

No.	Nat.	Player	Birth Date	Position	L/R
1	(Hungary)	Kristóf Csoma	January 26, 1992 (age 34)	Goalkeeper	
2	(Belarus)	Aleksey Kuzmeno	August 20, 1985 (age 40)		
3	(Hungary)	Farkas Dőry	September 11, 1993 (age 32)		
4	(Hungary)	Olivér Hornyák	April 7, 1996 (age 30)		
5	(Hungary)	József Berta	February 12, 1994 (age 32)		
6	(United States)	Alex Bowen	September 4, 1993 (age 32)	Wing	R
7	(Hungary)	Ádám Nagy	May 19, 1998 (age 28)		
8	(Hungary)	Dániel Sánta	March 20, 1994 (age 32)		
9	(Hungary)	Dániel Jakab	October 24, 1989 (age 36)		
10	(Montenegro) (Hungary)	Saša Mišić	March 27, 1987 (age 39)	Centre forward	R
11	(Serbia)	Miloš Miličić	May 10, 1991 (age 35)		
12	(Hungary)	Márton Halek	October 9, 1990 (age 35)		
13	(Hungary)	Dénes Dorián Lukács	June 17, 1997 (age 29)		
14	(Hungary)	Soma Kósik	February 16, 1994 (age 32)	Goalkeeper	
	(Hungary)	Dávid Szedmák	January 8, 1995 (age 31)		
	(Hungary)	Viktor Vadovics	June 24, 1998 (age 27)		

=== Staff ===
Technical Staff
Chairman	(Hungary) András Bachner
Manager	(Hungary) Gyula Takács
Head Coach	(Hungary) dr. József Sike

=== Transfers (2017-18) ===
Source: vizipolo.hu

In:

- (Hungary) József Berta (from Kaposvár)
- (Hungary) Farkas Dőry (from Ferencváros)
- (Belarus) Aleksey Kuzmeno (from Kinef Kirishi)
- (Hungary) Ádám Nagy (from Orvosegyetem)
- (Hungary) Dániel Sánta (from Szeged)

Out:

- (Hungary) Ábel Lukács (to Kaposvár)
- (Hungary) Levente Miklós (to Vasas)
- (Romania) (Hungary) Roland Szabó (to )

== Recent seasons ==
As of 20 May 2018.

=== Rankings in OB I ===
P.	16	17	18	19	20
5		5		5	
6			6		
7					
8					
9					
10	10				

=== In European competition ===
- Participations in Euro Cup: 2x

Season	Competition	Round	Club	Home	Away	Aggregate
2017-18	Euro Cup	Quarter-finals	(Russia) Spartak Volgograd	12–8	7–10	19–18
2017-18	Euro Cup	Semi-finals	(Hungary) Ferencváros	8–13	9–13	17–26
2019-20	Euro Cup	Quarter-finals	(Italy) Brescia	10–11	10–17	20–28

== Coaches ==
- (Hungary) József Sike (2015 – present)
