= Saša Mišić (water polo) =

Montenegrin water polo player

Personal information
- Born: 27 March 1987 (age 39)
- Height: 198 cm (6 ft 6 in)
- Weight: 109 kg (240 lb)

Sport
- Sport: Water polo
Medal record
Representing Montenegro
World Championships
Silver medal – second place	2013 Barcelona	team
European Championship
Silver medal – second place	2016 Belgrade	team
Representing North Macedonia
Universiade
Bronze medal – third place	2011 Shenzhen	Team

Saša Mišič (Serbian Cyrillic: Саша Мишич; born 27 March 1987) is a water polo player from Montenegro. He was part of the Montenegrin team at the 2016 Summer Olympics, where the team finished in fourth place.

== See also ==
- List of World Aquatics Championships medalists in water polo
