= Mátyás Pásztor =

Hungarian water polo player

Personal information
- Nationality: Hungarian
- Born: 20 February 1987 (age 39) Cegléd, Hungary
- Height: 190 cm (75 in)

Sport
- Sport: Water polo
- Handedness: Right
- Position: Centre
- Current club: Szolnok

Youth career
- Years: Team
- –: Cegléd

Senior clubs
- Years: Team
- –2006: BVSC-Zugló
- 2006–2014: Szolnok
- 2014–2022: BVSC-Zugló
- 2022–present: Szolnok
National team
- Years: Team
- 2009–: Hungary
Medal record
Men's water polo
Representing Hungary
Olympic Games
Bronze medal – third place	2020 Tokyo	Team
- Updated on 2 August 2023

Mátyás Pásztor (born 20 February 1987) is a Hungarian water polo player. He competed in the 2020 Summer Olympics.
