= Alex Bowen (water polo) =

American water polo player (born 1993)

Personal information
- Full name: Alexander Brant Bowen
- Born: September 4, 1993 (age 33) San Diego, California, U.S.
- Height: 196 cm (6 ft 5 in)
- Weight: 102 kg (225 lb)
- Spouse: Hilary Hansen (m. 2024)

Sport
- Sport: Water polo
- Position: Attacker, Utility position
- University team: Stanford Cardinal
- Club: San Diego Shores; New York Athletic Club
- Coached by: D. Dettamanti (Stanford); John Vargas (Stanford); Dejan Udovičić (2016-2024 Olympics)
Medal record
Men's water polo
Representing the United States
Olympic Games
Bronze medal – third place	2024 Paris	Team
World Cup
Bronze medal – third place	2023 Los Angeles	Team competition
Pan American Games
Gold medal – first place	2019 Lima	Team competition
Gold medal – first place	2023 Santiago	Team competition

Alexander Brant "Alex" Bowen (born September 4, 1993) is an American water polo player who competed for Stanford University and participated in water polo with three successive U.S. Water Polo teams from 2016-2024, winning a team bronze medal at the 2024 Paris Olympics.

== Early life ==
Bowen was born September 4, 1993, in San Diego, to Rod and Barbara Bowen and attended Santana High School, in Santee, California, graduating in 2011. He was the older of two male siblings, with a younger brother Eric. He first took up water polo at the age of six, as his father Rod was a water polo coach and acted as a mentor, driving him to early practices and meets. By nine, he was playing with the Jr. Olympic team, and was an All-American in the Junior Olympics from 2008-11. Beginning with a smaller club, he soon trained and competed with the San Diego Shores Water Polo Club where he was instrumental in leading the team in 2010 to a third-place finish at the Junior Olympics and a 2011 Junior Olympics fourth-place finish.

For his High School team, Bowen competed in both swimming and water polo, as a Junior captaining the water polo team, and as a senior captaining the swim team. During the High School water polo season which he played from August-November, he led Santana High to the 2007 and 2008 Grossmont North League titles, and then in 2009 and 2010, led Santana to Grossmont Valley League titles. A prolific scorer in his High School career, he led Santana to a record 547 goals for the CIF San Diego Section and as a High School Senior was a CIF San Diego Section Player of the Year.

== Stanford University ==
At Stanford University, his clear first choice in Water Polo programs, he competed and trained from 2001-2004, placing third in all-time goals with 253. A prolific shooter, Bowen was listed as a Utility player in his Stanford Bio, allowing him to play multiple field positions on offense including wing, point or driver, and attack the defense from many angles. During his Stanford collegiate career, where he trained around 5 hours daily split between a morning and afternoon practice, he was coached through 2001 by Dante Dettamanti and by John Vargas from 2002–2004. Bowen majored in product design at Stanford, returning to graduate in 2015.

During his collegiate career, Bowen had the eighth most career goals in the history of the Mountain Pacific Sports Federation. He graduated Stanford as their first four-time Association of Collegiate Water Polo Coaches (ACWPC) First Team All-American receiving the honor in each of his four years at Stanford. As a Senior, he was a Peter J. Cutino Award finalist.

== Olympics 2016-2024 ==
He competed in the men's water polo tournament at the 2016 Olympics in Rio, as well as at the 2020 Tokyo Olympics and the 2024 Paris Olympics. He was coached by Head U.S. Olympic water polo coaches Dejan Udovičić at the 2016 Rio, 2020 Tokyo, and 2024 Paris Olympics.

At the 2016 Olympics in Rio de Janeiro, the U.S. Men's team finished 10th overall, again under U.S. Head Olympic Coach Dejan Udovičić, with Serbia taking the Gold and Croatia the silver.

At the 2020 Tokyo Olympics, the U.S. team improved to a sixth place overall finish, again under U.S. Head Olympic Coach Dejan Udovičić, with Serbia taking the gold, Greece taking the silver, and Hungary taking the bronze.

In the 2024 Paris Olympics, Bowen was part of the U.S. team that won the team bronze medal. Serbia, a pre-Olympic favorite, performed well in the semi-finals, defeating the U.S. team 10-6, leading to a match with Croatia in the final, where Serbia took the gold in a 13-11 gold medal win. In America's bronze medal match, the U.S. team defeated Hungary in a penalty shootout, making it to the podium for the bronze medal for the first time since the team won silver at the 2008 Beijing Games.

=== International competition highlights ===
In the Summer Pan American games, Bowen was on the U.S. National team that won team gold medals at both the 2015 Pan American Games in Toronto, Canada and the 2019 Pan American Games in Lima, Peru. In 2023, he earned another team gold medal at the Pan American games in Santiago, Chile.

=== Professional play ===
From 2016-2020 prior to the 2024 Olympics, Bowen played with European professional teams to maintain his competitiveness and conditioning. He played with teams that included Steaua Bucharest, Partizan in Serbia, three years with Miskolc in Hungary from 2016-2019, and later Mladost Zagreb from 2019-2020. He has more recently played with France's Noisy‑le‑Sec team.

=== Marriage ===
On Saturday, August 31, 2024, Bowen married Hilary Renee Hansen at Christ Church in Coronado, California. The couple began dating in July, 2021, and Bowen proposed to Hansen in November 2022 in Paris. The couple were introduced by Hansen's cousin Jess Smith, a water polo team mate of Bowen, who played for Pepperdine University and was a member of the U.S. National Water Polo team that won a silver medal at the 2008 Beijing Olympics. Bowen's bride-to-be Hilary Hansen was a former High School water polo player.
