= 2013–14 Országos Bajnokság I (men's water polo) =

Water polo league season

OB I
- Season: 2013–14
- Champions: Eger (3rd title)
- Relegated: YBL
- Champions League: Eger; Szolnok; Orvosegyetem SC
- Euro Cup: Honvéd; Vasas
- Top goalscorer: Stefan Mitrović (86 goals)
- Biggest home win: Eger 24–5 YBL
- Biggest away win: YBL 8–21 Honvéd; YBL 6–19 Debrecen; YBL 9–22 Eger; YBL 6–19 BVSC; KSI 9–22 Szeged
- Highest scoring: FTC 22–21 KSI

The 2013–14 Országos Bajnokság I is the 108th season of the Országos Bajnokság I, Hungary's premier Water polo league.

== Team information ==
Locations of the 2013–14 Országos Bajnokság I
Budapest OB I waterpolo teams

The following 14 clubs compete in the OB I during the 2013–14 season:

OB I
| Team | City | Pool | Founded | Colours |
| BVSC-Zugló | Budapest | Szőnyi úti uszoda | 1911 | |
| Debrecen | Debrecen | Debreceni Sportuszoda | 2006 | |
| Eger | Eger | Bitskey Aladár uszoda | 1910 | |
| Ferencváros | Budapest | Népligeti uszoda | 1899 | |
| Honvéd | Budapest | Kőér utcai uszoda | 1950 | |
| Kaposvár | Kaposvár | Kaposvári Városi Fürdő | 1999 | |
| KSI | Budapest | Széchy Tamás uszoda | 1963 | |
| Orvosegyetem | Budapest | Nyéki Imre uszoda | 1957 | |
| PVSK | Pécs | Abay Nemes Oszkár Sportuszoda | 1919 | |
| Szeged | Szeged | Szegedi Sportuszoda | 1993 | |
| Szentes | Szentes | Szentesi uszoda | 1934 | |
| Szolnok | Szolnok | Tiszaligeti uszoda | 1921 | |
| Vasas | Budapest | Komjádi Béla Sportuszoda | 1945 | |
| YBL | Budapest | MOM Sportuszoda | 1980 | |

== Regular season ==
=== Standings ===
| | Team | Pld | W | D | L | GF | GA | Diff | Pts |
|---|---|---|---|---|---|---|---|---|---|
| 1 | Szolnoki Dózsa-KÖZGÉP | 26 | 24 | 0 | 2 | 355 | 195 | +160 | 72 |
| 2 | ZF-Eger | 26 | 23 | 1 | 2 | 372 | 192 | +180 | 70 |
| 3 | Diapolo Szeged | 26 | 21 | 1 | 4 | 322 | 210 | +112 | 64 |
| 4 | RacioNet Honvéd | 26 | 18 | 2 | 6 | 296 | 221 | +75 | 56 |
| 5 | LACTIV-VasasPlaket | 26 | 14 | 3 | 9 | 259 | 219 | +40 | 45 |
| 6 | Debrecen | 26 | 13 | 3 | 10 | 274 | 241 | +33 | 42 |
| 7 | BVSC-Zugló | 26 | 13 | 2 | 11 | 282 | 258 | +24 | 41 |
| 8 | Kaposvár | 26 | 12 | 1 | 13 | 247 | 270 | −23 | 37 |
| 9 | Széchenyi Bank-FTC | 26 | 10 | 1 | 15 | 233 | 253 | −20 | 31 |
| 10 | PVSK-Füszért | 26 | 7 | 2 | 17 | 217 | 278 | −61 | 23 |
| 11 | KSI SE | 26 | 6 | 2 | 18 | 246 | 350 | −104 | 20 |
| 12 | Valdor Szentes | 26 | 5 | 1 | 20 | 211 | 310 | −99 | 16 |
| 13 | OSC-Újbuda | 26 | 5 | 1 | 20 | 244 | 307 | −63 | 16 |
| 14 | YBL Waterpolo Club | 26 | 0 | 1 | 25 | 199 | 453 | −254 | 1 |

| Championship Playoff |
| European competition Playoff |
| Relegation Playoff |

Pld - Played; W - Won; L - Lost; PF - Points for; PA - Points against; Diff - Difference; Pts - Points.

=== Schedule and results ===
1. round
| KSI – BVSC-Zugló | 16–14 |
| Kaposvár – Szolnok | 9–13 |
| Ferencváros – Eger | 10–13 |
| Szentes – Debrecen | 10–10 |
| PVSK – Szeged | 8–8 |
| Orvosegyetem – Vasas | 11–14 |
| YBL – Honvéd | 8–21 |

2. round
| Kaposvár – Honvéd | 7–10 |
| BVSC-Zugló – Szentes | 11–7 |
| Eger – KSI | 20–5 |
| Debrecen – Szolnok | 4–5 |
| PVSK – Orvosegyetem | 7–9 |
| YBL – Szeged | 11–22 |
| Ferencváros – Vasas | 6–6 |

3. round
| Szeged – Kaposvár | 19–5 |
| BVSC-Zugló – Szolnok | 8–14 |
| Vasas – PVSK | 10–11 |
| Ferencváros – KSI | 10–11 |
| Eger – Szentes | 16–6 |
| Honvéd – Debrecen | 10–7 |
| Orvosegyetem – YBL | 17–9 |

4. round
| Eger – Szolnok | 13–9 |
| KSI – Vasas | 7–11 |
| Kaposvár – Orvosegyetem | 14–7 |
| Szentes – Ferencváros | 4–13 |
| YBL – PVSK | 5–17 |
| Debrecen – Szeged | 7–13 |
| Honvéd – BVSC-Zugló | 11–8 |

5. round
| Honvéd – KSI | 12–7 |
| Ferencváros – Szeged | 6–8 |
| YBL – Debrecen | 6–19 |
| PVSK – BVSC-Zugló | 10–12 |
| Vasas – Kaposvár | 8–9 |
| Orvosegyetem – Eger | 8–12 |
| Szolnok – Szentes | 21–5 |

6. round
| Honvéd – Szentes | 17–8 |
| Szeged – KSI | 17–4 |
| BVSC-Zugló – YBL | 16–7 |
| Debrecen – Kaposvár | 13–9 |
| Eger – PVSK | 16–6 |
| Szolnok – Vasas | 9–8 |
| Orvosegyetem – Ferencváros | 9–11 |

7. round
| Szolnok – Honvéd | 14–11 |
| KSI – Orvosegyetem | 9–11 |
| Szeged – Szentes | 22–10 |
| Kaposvár – BVSC-Zugló | 8–16 |
| YBL – Eger | 9–22 |
| PVSK – Ferencváros | 9–8 |
| Vasas – Debrecen | 12–8 |

8. round
| BVSC-Zugló – Debrecen | 11–14 |
| Honvéd – Vasas | 10–10 |
| Szeged – Szolnok | 6–8 |
| Kaposvár – Eger | 9–14 |
| Ferencváros – YBL | 19–8 |
| PVSK – KSI | 11–10 |
| Orvosegyetem – Szentes | 9–12 |

9. round
| Szeged – BVSC-Zugló | 9–7 |
| KSI – Szentes | 10–8 |
| Vasas – YBL | 14–5 |
| Ferencváros – Szolnok | 6–13 |
| PVSK – Kaposvár | 7–13 |
| Eger – Honvéd | 12–10 |
| Orvosegyetem – Debrecen | 7–10 |

10. round
| Szolnok – KSI | 17–9 |
| Kaposvár – YBL | 18–5 |
| BVSC-Zugló – Orvosegyetem | 9–7 |
| Vasas – Szentes | 10–5 |
| Debrecen – PVSK | 15–9 |
| Honvéd – Ferencváros | 12–10 |
| Szeged – Eger | 7–13 |

11. round
| Szolnok – Orvosegyetem | 14–7 |
| Szentes – PVSK | 5–8 |
| YBL – KSI | 8–14 |
| Kaposvár – Ferencváros | 12–8 |
| Vasas – BVSC-Zugló | 11–10 |
| Honvéd – Szeged | 13–12 |
| Debrecen – Eger | 5–12 |

12. round
| Szentes – YBL | 15–10 |
| KSI – Kaposvár | 11–18 |
| Ferencváros – Debrecen | 7–9 |
| Szeged – Vasas | 8–6 |
| Eger – BVSC-Zugló | 19–5 |
| PVSK – Szolnok | 10–16 |
| Orvosegyetem – Honvéd | 6–13 |

13. round
| Szolnok – YBL | 22–4 |
| Szeged – Orvosegyetem | 15–9 |
| Kaposvár – Szentes | 9–4 |
| Ferencváros – BVSC-Zugló | 7–12 |
| Vasas – Eger | 8–8 |
| Honvéd – PVSK | 15–8 |
| Debrecen – KSI | 18–10 |

14. round
| Honvéd – YBL | 16–8 |
| Debrecen – Szentes | 12–5 |
| Szolnok – Kaposvár | 16–6 |
| Szeged – PVSK | 15–9 |
| BVSC-Zugló – KSI | 12–10 |
| Vasas – Orvosegyetem | 16–9 |
| Eger – Ferencváros | 17–6 |

15. round
| Orvosegyetem – PVSK | 10–7 |
| KSI – Eger | 7–13 |
| Szentes – BVSC-Zugló | 8–11 |
| Honvéd – Kaposvár | 14–9 |
| Szolnok – Debrecen | 20–8 |
| Szeged – YBL | 19–9 |
| Vasas – Ferencváros | 10–7 |

16. round
| KSI – Ferencváros | 6–13 |
| YBL – Orvosegyetem | 6–17 |
| Szentes – Eger | 5–17 |
| Kaposvár – Szeged | 5–9 |
| Szolnok – BVSC-Zugló | 9–7 |
| Debrecen – Honvéd | 5–7 |
| PVSK – Vasas | 9–13 |

17. round
| PVSK – YBL | 16–9 |
| Ferencváros – Szentes | 13–12 |
| Orvosegyetem – Kaposvár | 7–9 |
| BVSC-Zugló – Honvéd | 14–11 |
| Vasas – KSI | 10–8 |
| Szeged – Debrecen | 12–9 |
| Szolnok – Eger | 8–6 |

18. round
| Kaposvár – Vasas | 5–9 |
| Szentes – Szolnok | 8–16 |
| Debrecen – YBL | 19–8 |
| KSI – Honvéd | 8–13 |
| BVSC-Zugló – PVSK | 14–5 |
| Szeged – Ferencváros | 11–6 |
| Eger – Orvosegyetem | 24–12 |

19. round
| Kaposvár – Debrecen | 8–8 |
| Szentes – Honvéd | 7–10 |
| YBL – BVSC-Zugló | 6–19 |
| KSI – Szeged | 9–22 |
| PVSK – Eger | 7–10 |
| Ferencváros – Orvosegyetem | 6–4 |
| Vasas – Szolnok | 7–12 |

20. round
| Debrecen – Vasas | 10–9 |
| Honvéd – Szolnok | 8–9 |
| BVSC-Zugló – Kaposvár | 6–8 |
| Orvosegyetem – KSI | 14–15 |
| Ferencváros – PVSK | 8–7 |
| Szentes – Szeged | 10–13 |
| Eger – YBL | 24–5 |

21. round
| Debrecen – BVSC-Zugló | 10–10 |
| Szolnok – Szeged | 8–9 |
| Eger – Kaposvár | 21–4 |
| Szentes – Orvosegyetem | 8–5 |
| YBL – Ferencváros | 9–14 |
| KSI – PVSK | 8–8 |
| Vasas – Honvéd | 4–11 |

22. round
| YBL – Vasas | 5–16 |
| Szentes – KSI | 11–12 |
| Kaposvár – PVSK | 5–7 |
| Szolnok – Ferencváros | 16–7 |
| Debrecen – Orvosegyetem | 13–7 |
| Honvéd – Eger | 5–8 |
| BVSC-Zugló – Szeged | 9–7 |

23. round
| YBL – Kaposvár | 11–16 |
| KSI – Szolnok | 8–19 |
| PVSK – Debrecen | 4–9 |
| Ferencváros – Honvéd | 8–10 |
| Orvosegyetem – BVSC-Zugló | 14–14 |
| Szentes – Vasas | 7–8 |
| Eger – Szeged | 7–9 |

24. round
| BVSC-Zugló – Vasas | 7–13 |
| Orvosegyetem – Szolnok | 12–15 |
| Ferencváros – Kaposvár | 13–11 |
| PVSK – Szentes | 7–13 |
| KSI – YBL | 12–12 |
| Szeged – Honvéd | 7–6 |
| Eger – Debrecen | 11–9 |

25. round
| BVSC-Zugló – Eger | 11–12 |
| Honvéd – Orvosegyetem | 12–9 |
| Debrecen – Ferencváros | 5–6 |
| Szolnok – PVSK | 14–3 |
| Kaposvár – KSI | 11–7 |
| YBL – Szentes | 10–11 |
| Vasas – Szeged | 9–10 |

26. round
| Orvosegyetem – Szeged | 7–13 |
| BVSC-Zugló – Ferencváros | 9–5 |
| PVSK – Honvéd | 7–8 |
| KSI – Debrecen | 13–17 |
| YBL – Szolnok | 6–18 |
| Szentes – Kaposvár | 7–10 |
| Eger – Vasas | 12–7 |

== Championship Playoff ==
Teams in bold won the playoff series. Numbers to the left of each team indicate the team's original playoff seeding. Numbers to the right indicate the score of each playoff game.

Semifinals
1 | **Szolnoki Dózsa-KÖZGÉP** | **12** | **10** | **16**
4 | RacioNet Honvéd | 6 | 5 | 9
2 | **ZF-Eger** | **14** | **10** | **11**
3 | Diapolo Szeged | 8 | 8 | 5

Final
1 | Szolnoki Dózsa-KÖZGÉP | 8 | **11** | 6 | 11
2 | **ZF-Eger** | **10** | 5 | **8** | **14**
Third place
3 | **Diapolo Szeged** | **7** | 8 | **11** | – | –
4 | RacioNet Honvéd | 6 | **13** | 7 | – | –

=== Semifinals ===
==== 1st leg ====
| 18 April; 18:45 (UTC+2) | Report | **Szolnoki Dózsa-KÖZGÉP** | **12**–6 | RacioNet Honvéd | Tiszaligeti uszoda, Szolnok; Referees: Rajmund Fodor, dr. Balázs Fekete |
| 18 April; 18:45 (UTC+2) | Report | Score by quarters: 3–1, 2–1, 6–2, 1–2 | | | Tiszaligeti uszoda, Szolnok; Referees: Rajmund Fodor, dr. Balázs Fekete |
| 18 April; 18:45 (UTC+2) | Report | four players 2 | **Goals** | Kiss, Illés 2 | Tiszaligeti uszoda, Szolnok; Referees: Rajmund Fodor, dr. Balázs Fekete |

| 19 April; 18:00 (UTC+2) | Report | **ZF-Eger** | **14**–8 | Diapolo Szeged | Bitskey Aladár uszoda, Eger; Referees: Dániel Homonnai, Zsolt Marjay |
| 19 April; 18:00 (UTC+2) | Report | Score by quarters: 4–4, 4–2, 3–0, 3–2 | | | Bitskey Aladár uszoda, Eger; Referees: Dániel Homonnai, Zsolt Marjay |
| 19 April; 18:00 (UTC+2) | Report | Gór-Nagy 4 | **Goals** | Molnár, Kunac 2 | Bitskey Aladár uszoda, Eger; Referees: Dániel Homonnai, Zsolt Marjay |

==== 2nd leg ====
| 23 April; 18:00 (UTC+2) | Report | RacioNet Honvéd | 5–**10** | **Szolnoki Dózsa-KÖZGÉP** | Kőér utcai uszoda, Budapest; Referees: Péter Molnár, Miklós Marnitz |
| 23 April; 18:00 (UTC+2) | Report | Score by quarters: 0–2, 2–2, 2–4, 1–2 | | | Kőér utcai uszoda, Budapest; Referees: Péter Molnár, Miklós Marnitz |
| 23 April; 18:00 (UTC+2) | Report | Kiss, Kovács 2 | **Goals** | Aleksić 4 | Kőér utcai uszoda, Budapest; Referees: Péter Molnár, Miklós Marnitz |

| 23 April; 18:30 (UTC+2) | Report | Diapolo Szeged | 8–**10** | **ZF-Eger** | Szegedi Sportuszoda, Szeged; Referees: Zsolt Csizmadia, András Petik |
| 23 April; 18:30 (UTC+2) | Report | Score by quarters: 2–3, 2–2, 4–3, 0–2 | | | Szegedi Sportuszoda, Szeged; Referees: Zsolt Csizmadia, András Petik |
| 23 April; 18:30 (UTC+2) | Report | Hegedűs 3 | **Goals** | Bátori, Graham, Gór-Nagy 2 | Szegedi Sportuszoda, Szeged; Referees: Zsolt Csizmadia, András Petik |

==== 3rd leg ====
| 25 April; 16:00 (UTC+2) | Report | **Szolnoki Dózsa-KÖZGÉP** | **16**–9 | RacioNet Honvéd | Tiszaligeti uszoda, Szolnok; Referees: Szabolcs Dodog, dr. Balázs Fekete |
| 25 April; 16:00 (UTC+2) | Report | Score by quarters: 4–2, 5–3, 4–3, 3–1 | | | Tiszaligeti uszoda, Szolnok; Referees: Szabolcs Dodog, dr. Balázs Fekete |
| 25 April; 16:00 (UTC+2) | Report | Aleksić 6 | **Goals** | Fülöp 5 | Tiszaligeti uszoda, Szolnok; Referees: Szabolcs Dodog, dr. Balázs Fekete |

Szolnoki Dózsa-KÖZGÉP won series 3–0 and advanced to Final.

| 25 April; 17:45 (UTC+2) | Report | **ZF-Eger** | **11**–5 | Diapolo Szeged | Bitskey Aladár uszoda, Eger; Referees: Zsolt Csanádi, Balázs Székely |
| 25 April; 17:45 (UTC+2) | Report | Score by quarters: 2–4, 4–1, 3–0, 2–0 | | | Bitskey Aladár uszoda, Eger; Referees: Zsolt Csanádi, Balázs Székely |
| 25 April; 17:45 (UTC+2) | Report | four players 2 | **Goals** | Tóth, Kunac 2 | Bitskey Aladár uszoda, Eger; Referees: Zsolt Csanádi, Balázs Székely |

ZF-Eger won series 3–0 and advanced to Final.

=== Final ===
==== 1st leg ====
| 9 May; 18:30 (UTC+2) | Report | Szolnoki Dózsa-KÖZGÉP | 8–**10** | **ZF-Eger** | Tiszaligeti uszoda, Szolnok; Attendance: 1,000; Referees: Balázs Székely, Rajmund Fodor |
| 9 May; 18:30 (UTC+2) | Report | Score by quarters: 2–2, 2–2, 2–2, 2–4 | | | Tiszaligeti uszoda, Szolnok; Attendance: 1,000; Referees: Balázs Székely, Rajmund Fodor |
| 9 May; 18:30 (UTC+2) | Report | Aleksić 4 | **Goals** | Bátori, Biros, Kovács 2 | Tiszaligeti uszoda, Szolnok; Attendance: 1,000; Referees: Balázs Székely, Rajmund Fodor |

==== 2nd leg ====
| 12 May; 19:30 (UTC+2) | Report | ZF-Eger | 5–**11** | **Szolnoki Dózsa-KÖZGÉP** | Bitskey Aladár uszoda, Eger; Attendance: 2,500; Referees: András Petik, Péter Molnár |
| 12 May; 19:30 (UTC+2) | Report | Score by quarters: 2–5, 2–2, 1–2, 0–2 | | | Bitskey Aladár uszoda, Eger; Attendance: 2,500; Referees: András Petik, Péter Molnár |
| 12 May; 19:30 (UTC+2) | Report | Varga 2 | **Goals** | Aleksić 3 | Bitskey Aladár uszoda, Eger; Attendance: 2,500; Referees: András Petik, Péter Molnár |

==== 3rd leg ====
| 15 May; 19:15 (UTC+2) | Report | Szolnoki Dózsa-KÖZGÉP | 6–**8** | **ZF-Eger** | Tiszaligeti uszoda, Szolnok; Attendance: 1,100; Referees: Szabolcs Dodog, Balázs Székely |
| 15 May; 19:15 (UTC+2) | Report | Score by quarters: 3–2, 1–0, 2–4, 0–2 | | | Tiszaligeti uszoda, Szolnok; Attendance: 1,100; Referees: Szabolcs Dodog, Balázs Székely |
| 15 May; 19:15 (UTC+2) | Report | Hosnyánszky, Aleksić 2 | **Goals** | Biros 3 | Tiszaligeti uszoda, Szolnok; Attendance: 1,100; Referees: Szabolcs Dodog, Balázs Székely |

==== 4th leg ====
| 19 May; 19:15 (UTC+2) | Report | **ZF-Eger** | **14**–11 | Szolnoki Dózsa-KÖZGÉP | Bitskey Aladár uszoda, Eger; Attendance: 3,000; Referees: András Németh, Rajmund Fodor |
| 19 May; 19:15 (UTC+2) | Report | Score by quarters: 3–4, 2–4, 5–0, 4–3 | | | Bitskey Aladár uszoda, Eger; Attendance: 3,000; Referees: András Németh, Rajmund Fodor |
| 19 May; 19:15 (UTC+2) | Report | Biros, Hárai 3 | **Goals** | Hosnyánszky 4 | Bitskey Aladár uszoda, Eger; Attendance: 3,000; Referees: András Németh, Rajmund Fodor |

ZF-Eger won Championship final series 3–1.

=== Third Place ===
| 10 May; 17:30 (UTC+2) | Report | **Diapolo Szeged** | **7**–6 | RacioNet Honvéd | Szegedi Sportuszoda, Szeged; Referees: Zsolt Csizmadia, dr. Balázs Fekete |
| 10 May; 17:30 (UTC+2) | Report | Score by quarters: 1–0, 4–1, 1–3, 1–2 | | | Szegedi Sportuszoda, Szeged; Referees: Zsolt Csizmadia, dr. Balázs Fekete |
| 10 May; 17:30 (UTC+2) | Report | seven players 1 | **Goals** | Fülöp 2 | Szegedi Sportuszoda, Szeged; Referees: Zsolt Csizmadia, dr. Balázs Fekete |

| 14 May; 18:00 (UTC+2) | Report | **RacioNet Honvéd** | **13**–8 | Diapolo Szeged | Kőér utcai uszoda, Budapest; Referees: Péter Molnár, András Petik |
| 14 May; 18:00 (UTC+2) | Report | Score by quarters: 3–4, 1–2, 4–1, 5–1 | | | Kőér utcai uszoda, Budapest; Referees: Péter Molnár, András Petik |
| 14 May; 18:00 (UTC+2) | Report | Szőke, Takei 3 | **Goals** | Jansik 3 | Kőér utcai uszoda, Budapest; Referees: Péter Molnár, András Petik |

| 17 May; 17:00 (UTC+2) | Report | **Diapolo Szeged** | **11**–7 | RacioNet Honvéd | Szegedi Sportuszoda, Szeged; Referees: Balázs Székely, Rajmund Fodor |
| 17 May; 17:00 (UTC+2) | Report | Score by quarters: 4–1, 2–2, 4–3, 1–1 | | | Szegedi Sportuszoda, Szeged; Referees: Balázs Székely, Rajmund Fodor |
| 17 May; 17:00 (UTC+2) | Report | Tóth 4 | **Goals** | Kiss 2 | Szegedi Sportuszoda, Szeged; Referees: Balázs Székely, Rajmund Fodor |

Diapolo Szeged won series 2–1 and won the Third Place

== European competition Playoff ==
5-8. Placement
5 | LACTIV-VasasPlaket | 12 | 12
8 | Kaposvár | 5 | 7
6 | Debrecen | 9 | 7 | 12
7 | BVSC-Zugló | 7 | 11 | 6

Fifth place
5 | LACTIV-VasasPlaket | 12 | 5 | 11
6 | Debrecen | 9 | 9 | 8
Seventh place
7 | BVSC-Zugló | 11 | 7 | 12
8 | Kaposvár | 7 | 11 | 9

=== 5-8. Placement ===
==== 1st leg ====
| 19 April; 20:30 (UTC+2) | Report | LACTIV-VasasPlaket | 12–5 | Kaposvár | Komjádi Béla Sportuszoda, Budapest; Referees: Zsolt Csizmadia, Gábor Vogel |
| 19 April; 20:30 (UTC+2) | Report | Score by quarters: 3–1, 4–2, 3–1, 2–1 | | | Komjádi Béla Sportuszoda, Budapest; Referees: Zsolt Csizmadia, Gábor Vogel |
| 19 April; 20:30 (UTC+2) | Report | Angyal 3 | Goals | Ronen 2 | Komjádi Béla Sportuszoda, Budapest; Referees: Zsolt Csizmadia, Gábor Vogel |

| 20 April; 18:00 (UTC+2) | Report | Debrecen | 9–7 | BVSC-Zugló | Debreceni Sportuszoda, Debrecen; Referees: Szabolcs Dodog, András Petik |
| 20 April; 18:00 (UTC+2) | Report | Score by quarters: 2–2, 2–1, 2–2, 3–2 | | | Debreceni Sportuszoda, Debrecen; Referees: Szabolcs Dodog, András Petik |
| 20 April; 18:00 (UTC+2) | Report | Marnitz, Kállay 2 | Goals | Nyéki 2 | Debreceni Sportuszoda, Debrecen; Referees: Szabolcs Dodog, András Petik |

==== 2nd leg ====
| 22 April; 19:30 (UTC+2) | Report | Kaposvár | 7–12 | LACTIV-VasasPlaket | Városi Fürdő, Kaposvár; Referees: Dániel Homonnai, dr. Balázs Fekete |
| 22 April; 19:30 (UTC+2) | Report | Score by quarters: 1–2, 2–4, 2–3, 2–3 | | | Városi Fürdő, Kaposvár; Referees: Dániel Homonnai, dr. Balázs Fekete |
| 22 April; 19:30 (UTC+2) | Report | seven players 1 | Goals | Manhercz 3 | Városi Fürdő, Kaposvár; Referees: Dániel Homonnai, dr. Balázs Fekete |

LACTIV-VasasPlaket won series 2–0 and advanced to Fifth placement matches.

| 23 April; 20:00 (UTC+2) | Report | BVSC-Zugló | 11–7 | Debrecen | Szőnyi úti uszoda, Budapest; Referees: András Németh, Balázs Székely |
| 23 April; 20:00 (UTC+2) | Report | Score by quarters: 4–1, 2–0, 2–3, 3–3 | | | Szőnyi úti uszoda, Budapest; Referees: András Németh, Balázs Székely |
| 23 April; 20:00 (UTC+2) | Report | Létay 5 | Goals | Marnitz 4 | Szőnyi úti uszoda, Budapest; Referees: András Németh, Balázs Székely |

==== 3rd leg ====
| 26 April; 16:30 (UTC+2) | Report | Debrecen | 12–6 | BVSC-Zugló | Debreceni Sportuszoda, Debrecen; Referees: dr. Tamás Molnár, Zsolt Marjay |
| 26 April; 16:30 (UTC+2) | Report | Score by quarters: 2–2, 5–2, 3–0, 2–2 | | | Debreceni Sportuszoda, Debrecen; Referees: dr. Tamás Molnár, Zsolt Marjay |
| 26 April; 16:30 (UTC+2) | Report | Kállay 3 | Goals | Szabó 3 | Debreceni Sportuszoda, Debrecen; Referees: dr. Tamás Molnár, Zsolt Marjay |

Debrecen won series 2–1 and advanced to Fifth placement matches.

=== 5th Place ===
| 3 May; 19:00 (UTC+2) | Report | LACTIV-VasasPlaket | 12–9 | Debrecen | Komjádi Béla Sportuszoda, Budapest; Referees: Rajmund Fodor, Ándrás Németh |
| 3 May; 19:00 (UTC+2) | Report | Score by quarters: 4–2, 4–3, 3–2, 1–2 | | | Komjádi Béla Sportuszoda, Budapest; Referees: Rajmund Fodor, Ándrás Németh |
| 3 May; 19:00 (UTC+2) | Report | Csapó, Katonás 3 | Goals | Marnitz, Weszelovszky, Kállay 2 | Komjádi Béla Sportuszoda, Budapest; Referees: Rajmund Fodor, Ándrás Németh |

| 6 May; 17:30 (UTC+2) | Report | Debrecen | 9–5 | LACTIV-VasasPlaket | Debreceni Sportuszoda, Debrecen; Referees: dr. Tamás Molnár, Gábor Vogel |
| 6 May; 17:30 (UTC+2) | Report | Score by quarters: 3–1, 2–2, 2–2, 2–0 | | | Debreceni Sportuszoda, Debrecen; Referees: dr. Tamás Molnár, Gábor Vogel |
| 6 May; 17:30 (UTC+2) | Report | Marnitz 3 | Goals | five players 1 | Debreceni Sportuszoda, Debrecen; Referees: dr. Tamás Molnár, Gábor Vogel |

| 9 May; 19:30 (UTC+2) | Report | LACTIV-VasasPlaket | 11–8 | Debrecen | Komjádi Béla Sportuszoda, Budapest; Referees: András Petik, Zsolt Marjay |
| 9 May; 19:30 (UTC+2) | Report | Score by quarters: 3–3, 4–2, 2–1, 2–2 | | | Komjádi Béla Sportuszoda, Budapest; Referees: András Petik, Zsolt Marjay |
| 9 May; 19:30 (UTC+2) | Report | Brguljan 3 | Goals | Halek, Marnitz 2 | Komjádi Béla Sportuszoda, Budapest; Referees: András Petik, Zsolt Marjay |

LACTIV-VasasPlaket won series 2–1 and won 5th Place.

=== 7th Place ===
| 4 May; 12:00 (UTC+2) | Report | BVSC-Zugló | 11–7 | Kaposvár | Szőnyi úti uszoda, Budapest; Referees: Zsolt Marjay, dr. Balázs Fekete |
| 4 May; 12:00 (UTC+2) | Report | Score by quarters: 4–2, 2–0, 2–3, 3–2 | | | Szőnyi úti uszoda, Budapest; Referees: Zsolt Marjay, dr. Balázs Fekete |
| 4 May; 12:00 (UTC+2) | Report | Létay 3 | Goals | Berta, Juhász-Szelei 2 | Szőnyi úti uszoda, Budapest; Referees: Zsolt Marjay, dr. Balázs Fekete |

| 7 May; 11:00 (UTC+2) | Report | Kaposvár | 11–7 | BVSC-Zugló | Városi Fürdő, Kaposvár; Referees: Rajmund Fodor, dr. Attila Marosvári |
| 7 May; 11:00 (UTC+2) | Report | Score by quarters: 2–1, 3–2, 4–1, 2–3 | | | Városi Fürdő, Kaposvár; Referees: Rajmund Fodor, dr. Attila Marosvári |
| 7 May; 11:00 (UTC+2) | Report | Surányi 3 | Goals | Borsós, Létay 2 | Városi Fürdő, Kaposvár; Referees: Rajmund Fodor, dr. Attila Marosvári |

| 10 May; 10:00 (UTC+2) | Report | BVSC-Zugló | 12–9 | Kaposvár | Szőnyi úti uszoda, Budapest; Referees: Csaba Horváth, Péter Mucskai |
| 10 May; 10:00 (UTC+2) | Report | Score by quarters: 3–1, 2–1, 3–3, 4–4 | | | Szőnyi úti uszoda, Budapest; Referees: Csaba Horváth, Péter Mucskai |
| 10 May; 10:00 (UTC+2) | Report | Létay 4 | Goals | Surányi 5 | Szőnyi úti uszoda, Budapest; Referees: Csaba Horváth, Péter Mucskai |

BVSC-Zugló won series 2–1 and won 7th Place.

== Relegation Playoff ==
Relegation Semifinals
11 | KSI SE | 7 | 12
14 | YBL Waterpolo Club | 5 | 10
12 | Valdor Szentes | 7 | 13
13 | OSC-Újbuda | 12 | 14

9-12. Placement
9 | Széchenyi Bank-FTC | 22 | 15
11 | KSI SE | 21 | 14
10 | PVSK-Füszért | 8 | 14
13 | OSC-Újbuda | 7 | 10

Ninth place
9 | Széchenyi Bank-FTC | 7 | 13 | 10
10 | PVSK-Füszért | 6 | 14 | 7

=== Relegation Semifinals ===
==== 1st leg ====
| 19 April; 11:00 (UTC+2) | Report | KSI SE | 7–5 | YBL Waterpolo Club | Széchy Tamás uszoda, Budapest; Referees: dr. Attila Marosvári, Antal Pásztor |
| 19 April; 11:00 (UTC+2) | Report | Score by quarters: 4–1, 2–0, 0–4, 1–0 | | | Széchy Tamás uszoda, Budapest; Referees: dr. Attila Marosvári, Antal Pásztor |
| 19 April; 11:00 (UTC+2) | Report | Kalanovics 3 | Goals | Major 2 | Széchy Tamás uszoda, Budapest; Referees: dr. Attila Marosvári, Antal Pásztor |

| 19 April; 18:00 (UTC+2) | Report | Valdor Szentes | 7–12 | OSC-Újbuda | Szentesi uszoda, Szentes; Referees: Miklós Marnitz, Balázs Székely |
| 19 April; 18:00 (UTC+2) | Report | Score by quarters: 3–2, 0–2, 2–4, 2–4 | | | Szentesi uszoda, Szentes; Referees: Miklós Marnitz, Balázs Székely |
| 19 April; 18:00 (UTC+2) | Report | Kistamás, Kolarik 2 | Goals | Baches Delgado 4 | Szentesi uszoda, Szentes; Referees: Miklós Marnitz, Balázs Székely |

==== 2nd leg ====
| 22 April; 18:00 (UTC+2) | Report | YBL Waterpolo Club | 10–12 | KSI SE | MOM Sportuszoda, Budapest; Referees: Rajmund Fodor, Gábor Vogel |
| 22 April; 18:00 (UTC+2) | Report | Score by quarters: 2–3, 2–2, 4–3, 2–4 | | | MOM Sportuszoda, Budapest; Referees: Rajmund Fodor, Gábor Vogel |
| 22 April; 18:00 (UTC+2) | Report | Major 3 | Goals | Fejős, Miklós 3 | MOM Sportuszoda, Budapest; Referees: Rajmund Fodor, Gábor Vogel |

KSI SE won series 2–0 and advanced to Placement Semifinal matches.

| 23 April; 20:30 (UTC+2) | Report | OSC-Újbuda | 14–13 (OT) | Valdor Szentes | Nyéki Imre uszoda, Budapest; Referees: Zsolt Marjay, Zsolt Füzesi |
| 23 April; 20:30 (UTC+2) | Report | Score by quarters: 2–1, 3–1, 3–2, 1–5 OT: 5–4 | | | Nyéki Imre uszoda, Budapest; Referees: Zsolt Marjay, Zsolt Füzesi |
| 23 April; 20:30 (UTC+2) | Report | Baches Delgado 5 | Goals | Kistamás, Szabó I., Nagy 3 | Nyéki Imre uszoda, Budapest; Referees: Zsolt Marjay, Zsolt Füzesi |

OSC-Újbuda won series 2–0 and advanced to Placement Semifinal matches.

=== 9-12. Placement ===
==== 1st leg ====
| 29 April; 19:30 (UTC+2) | Report | Széchenyi Bank-FTC | 22–21 (OT) | KSI SE | Népligeti uszoda, Budapest; Referees: Dániel Homonnai, György Kun |
| 29 April; 19:30 (UTC+2) | Report | Score by quarters: 5–4, 2–2, 2–2, 1–2 OT: 0–0, 0–0 pen. 12–11 | | | Népligeti uszoda, Budapest; Referees: Dániel Homonnai, György Kun |
| 29 April; 19:30 (UTC+2) | Report | Tyler 8 | Goals | Kovács 5 | Népligeti uszoda, Budapest; Referees: Dániel Homonnai, György Kun |

| 3 May; 19:00 (UTC+2) | Report | PVSK-Füszért | 8–7 | OSC-Újbuda | Abay Nemes Oszkár Sportuszoda, Pécs; Referees: Zsolt Csizmadia, Balázs Székely |
| 3 May; 19:00 (UTC+2) | Report | Score by quarters: 2–1, 0–1, 1–2, 5–3 | | | Abay Nemes Oszkár Sportuszoda, Pécs; Referees: Zsolt Csizmadia, Balázs Székely |
| 3 May; 19:00 (UTC+2) | Report | Bereczki, Müller 2 | Goals | Cseh, Baches Delgado 2 | Abay Nemes Oszkár Sportuszoda, Pécs; Referees: Zsolt Csizmadia, Balázs Székely |

==== 2nd leg ====
| 3 May; 11:00 (UTC+2) | Report | KSI SE | 14–15 (OT) | Széchenyi Bank-FTC | Széchy Tamás uszoda, Budapest; Referees: András Petik, Péter Mucskai |
| 3 May; 11:00 (UTC+2) | Report | Score by quarters: 2–3, 2–1, 2–3, 2–1 OT: 0–0, 0–0 pen. 6–7 | | | Széchy Tamás uszoda, Budapest; Referees: András Petik, Péter Mucskai |
| 3 May; 11:00 (UTC+2) | Report | Kalanovics 4 | Goals | Ernyey 6 | Széchy Tamás uszoda, Budapest; Referees: András Petik, Péter Mucskai |

Széchenyi Bank-FTC won series 2–0 and advanced to Ninth placement matches.

| 7 May; 20:30 (UTC+2) | Report | OSC-Újbuda | 10–14 | PVSK-Füszért | Nyéki Imre uszoda, Budapest; Referees: Zsolt Marjay, András Petik |
| 7 May; 20:30 (UTC+2) | Report | Score by quarters: 3–4, 2–2, 2–2, 3–6 | | | Nyéki Imre uszoda, Budapest; Referees: Zsolt Marjay, András Petik |
| 7 May; 20:30 (UTC+2) | Report | Baches Delgado 3 | Goals | Ágnes, Müller 3 | Nyéki Imre uszoda, Budapest; Referees: Zsolt Marjay, András Petik |

PVSK-Füszért won series 2–0 and advanced to Ninth placement matches.

=== 9th Place ===
| 12 May; 19:30 (UTC+2) | Report | Széchenyi Bank-FTC | 7–6 | PVSK-Füszért | Népligeti uszoda, Budapest; Referees: dr. Tamás Molnár, Balázs Székely |
| 12 May; 19:30 (UTC+2) | Report | Score by quarters: 1–2, 2–1, 2–1, 2–2 | | | Népligeti uszoda, Budapest; Referees: dr. Tamás Molnár, Balázs Székely |
| 12 May; 19:30 (UTC+2) | Report | Tyler 5 | Goals | De Blasio 2 | Népligeti uszoda, Budapest; Referees: dr. Tamás Molnár, Balázs Székely |

| 15 May; 19:00 (UTC+2) | Report | PVSK-Füszért | 14–13 | Széchenyi Bank-FTC | Abay Nemes Oszkár Sportuszoda, Pécs; Referees: Zsolt Csizmadia, Zsolt Marjay |
| 15 May; 19:00 (UTC+2) | Report | Score by quarters: 4–3, 5–2, 4–5, 1–3 | | | Abay Nemes Oszkár Sportuszoda, Pécs; Referees: Zsolt Csizmadia, Zsolt Marjay |
| 15 May; 19:00 (UTC+2) | Report | Csacsovszky, Hoppál, Müller 3 | Goals | Tyler 4 | Abay Nemes Oszkár Sportuszoda, Pécs; Referees: Zsolt Csizmadia, Zsolt Marjay |

| 18 May; 11:30 (UTC+2) | Report | Széchenyi Bank-FTC | 10–7 | PVSK-Füszért | Népligeti uszoda, Budapest; Referees: György Kun, András Németh |
| 18 May; 11:30 (UTC+2) | Report | Score by quarters: 5–1, 2–3, 2–2, 1–1 | | | Népligeti uszoda, Budapest; Referees: György Kun, András Németh |
| 18 May; 11:30 (UTC+2) | Report | Francsics 3 | Goals | Hoppál, Ágnes 2 | Népligeti uszoda, Budapest; Referees: György Kun, András Németh |

Széchenyi Bank-FTC won series 2–1 and won 9th Place.

=== 11th Place ===
| 13 May; 18:30 (UTC+2) | Report | KSI SE | 12–4 | OSC-Újbuda | Széchy Tamás uszoda, Budapest; Referees: István Vojvoda, György Kun |
| 13 May; 18:30 (UTC+2) | Report | Score by quarters: 3–1, 2–1, 4–0, 3–2 | | | Széchy Tamás uszoda, Budapest; Referees: István Vojvoda, György Kun |
| 13 May; 18:30 (UTC+2) | Report | Kalanovics 4 | Goals | Császár 2 | Széchy Tamás uszoda, Budapest; Referees: István Vojvoda, György Kun |

| 16 May; 20:00 (UTC+2) | Report | OSC-Újbuda | 18–13 | KSI SE | Nyéki Imre uszoda, Budapest; Referees: Zsolt Csanádi, dr. Balázs Fekete |
| 16 May; 20:00 (UTC+2) | Report | Score by quarters: 4–1, 4–3, 4–6, 6–3 | | | Nyéki Imre uszoda, Budapest; Referees: Zsolt Csanádi, dr. Balázs Fekete |
| 16 May; 20:00 (UTC+2) | Report | Regős 6 | Goals | Kalanovics 3 | Nyéki Imre uszoda, Budapest; Referees: Zsolt Csanádi, dr. Balázs Fekete |

| 19 May; 18:30 (UTC+2) | Report | KSI SE | 6–9 | OSC-Újbuda | Széchy Tamás uszoda, Budapest; Referees: Zsolt Marjay, György Kun |
| 19 May; 18:30 (UTC+2) | Report | Score by quarters: 3–2, 1–1, 0–5, 2–1 | | | Széchy Tamás uszoda, Budapest; Referees: Zsolt Marjay, György Kun |
| 19 May; 18:30 (UTC+2) | Report | Kovács 3 | Goals | Császár 3 | Széchy Tamás uszoda, Budapest; Referees: Zsolt Marjay, György Kun |

OSC-Újbuda won series 2–1 and won 11th Place.

=== 13th Place ===
| 3 May; 18:00 (UTC+2) | Report | Valdor Szentes | 20–10 | YBL Waterpolo Club | Szentesi uszoda, Szentes; Referees: Károly Rubos, Miklós Marnitz |
| 3 May; 18:00 (UTC+2) | Report | Score by quarters: 4–2, 4–2, 5–1, 7–5 | | | Szentesi uszoda, Szentes; Referees: Károly Rubos, Miklós Marnitz |
| 3 May; 18:00 (UTC+2) | Report | Pellei 4 | Goals | Major 3 | Szentesi uszoda, Szentes; Referees: Károly Rubos, Miklós Marnitz |

| 6 May; 18:45 (UTC+2) | Report | YBL Waterpolo Club | 5–13 | Valdor Szentes | MOM Sportuszoda, Budapest; Referees: Péter Molnár, László Bors |
| 6 May; 18:45 (UTC+2) | Report | Score by quarters: 0–3, 2–5, 0–3, 3–2 | | | MOM Sportuszoda, Budapest; Referees: Péter Molnár, László Bors |
| 6 May; 18:45 (UTC+2) | Report | five players 1 | Goals | Kolarik 3 | MOM Sportuszoda, Budapest; Referees: Péter Molnár, László Bors |

Valdor Szentes won series 2–0 and won 13th Place.

== Season statistics ==
=== Top goalscorers ===
Sources: official website

| # | Player | Goals | Team |
|---|---|---|---|
| 1 | (Serbia) Stefan Mitrović | 86 | Szolnok |
| 2 | (Hungary) Krisztián Létay | 76 | BVSC |
| 3 | (Hungary) Bence Bátori | 74 | Eger |
| 4 | (Japan) Koji Takei | 67 | Honvéd |
| 5 | (Canada) Martin Tyler | 66 | FTC |
| 6 | (Hungary) Márton Szivós | 65 | Szeged |
| 7 | (Hungary) Gergely Kiss | 63 | Honvéd |
| 8 | (Hungary) Balázs Nyéki | 62 | BVSC |
| 9 | (Hungary) Gergő Kovács | 61 | KSI |
| 10 | (Hungary) Gergő Marnitz | 60 | Debrecen |

=== Top assists ===
Sources: official website

| # | Player | Assists | Team |
|---|---|---|---|
| 1 | (Hungary) Dániel Németh | 64 | Szentes |
| 2 | (Hungary) Zoltán Mátyás | 63 | Honvéd |
| 3 | (Hungary) Adrián Simon | 62 | OSC |
| 4 | (Hungary) Erik Bundschuch | 61 | Eger |
| 5 | (Hungary) Bendegúz Szabó | 60 | BVSC |
| 6 | (Hungary) Dávid Jansik | 59 | Szolnok |
| 7 | (Hungary) Bálint Takács | 56 | Vasas |
| 8 | (Hungary) Dávid Hőna | 50 | Vasas |
| 8 | (Canada) Martin Tyler | 50 | FTC |
| 10 | (Hungary) Ádám Decker | 49 | Szeged |

== Final standing ==
| Qualified for the 2014–15 LEN Champions League |
| relegation play-off |
| Relegation to the 2014–15 OB I/B |

| Rank | Team |
|---|---|
| 1st place, gold medalist(s) | ZF-Eger |
| 2nd place, silver medalist(s) | Szolnoki Dózsa-KÖZGÉP |
| 3rd place, bronze medalist(s) | Diapolo Szeged |
| 4 | RacioNet Honvéd |
| 5 | LACTIV-VasasPlaket |
| 6 | Debrecen |
| 7 | BVSC-Zugló |
| 8 | Kaposvár |
| 9 | Széchenyi Bank-FTC |
| 10 | PVSK-Füszért |
| 11 | OSC-Újbuda^{1} |
| 12 | KSI SE |
| 13 | Valdor Szentes |
| 14 | YBL Waterpolo Club |

2013–14 OB I Champions
ZF-Eger
3rd Title

1 Dávid Bisztritsányi, 2 Máté Sántavy, 3 Bence Bátori, 4 Kevin Graham
5 Ferenc Salamon (water polo, born 1988), 6 Gábor Kovács, 7 Krisztián Bedő, 8 Zsolt Varga
9 Gergő Zalánki, 10 Miklós Gór-Nagy, 11 Erik Bundschuch
12 Balázs Hárai, 13 Péter Biros (c), 14 Marcell Meixner
Head coach
Norbert Dabrowski

^{1} Originally, Diapolo Szeged qualified for the qualifying round I as they won the third place in 2013–14 OB I championship, the LEN Champions League spot was passed to OSC-Újbuda.

=== Play-off ===
The overall winner will play in 2014–15 OB I and the loser one in OB I/B.

| 1 July; 18:00 (UTC+2) | Report | Valdor Szentes | 6–4 | PannErgy-MVLC | Szentesi uszoda, Szentes; Referees: Péter Molnár, Gábor Vogel |
| 1 July; 18:00 (UTC+2) | Report | Score by quarters: 2–1, 1–0, 1–1, 2–2 | | | Szentesi uszoda, Szentes; Referees: Péter Molnár, Gábor Vogel |
| 1 July; 18:00 (UTC+2) | Report | six players 1 | Goals | Bánhidy 2 | Szentesi uszoda, Szentes; Referees: Péter Molnár, Gábor Vogel |

| 3 July; 19:15 (UTC+2) | Report | PannErgy-MVLC | 10–17 | Valdor Szentes | Kemény Dénes Sportuszoda, Miskolc; Referees: Balázs Székely, Péter Mucskai |
| 3 July; 19:15 (UTC+2) | Report | Score by quarters: 1–2, 3–4, 3–7, 3–4 | | | Kemény Dénes Sportuszoda, Miskolc; Referees: Balázs Székely, Péter Mucskai |
| 3 July; 19:15 (UTC+2) | Report | Jakab 3 | Goals | Kistamás, Kolarik 4 | Kemény Dénes Sportuszoda, Miskolc; Referees: Balázs Székely, Péter Mucskai |

Valdor Szentes won series 2–0 and will play in 2014–15 OB I.
