= 2005–06 Országos Bajnokság I (men's water polo) =

Water polo league season

OB I
- Season: 2005–06
- Champions: Honvéd
- Euroleague: Honvéd; Vasas; Eger
- LEN Cup: Szeged; Újpest

2005–06 Országos Bajnokság I (men's water polo) was the 100th water polo championship in Hungary.

== First stage ==
#	Team	M	W	D	L	G+	G−	P
1.	Domino-Bp. Honvéd	22	21	0	1	362	160	42
2.	TEVA-Vasas SC-Plaket	22	19	1	2	287	159	39
3.	Brendon-Fenstherm-ZF-Egri VK	22	18	1	3	316	203	37
4.	Szeged-Beton VE	22	12	4	6	233	178	28
5.	Újpesti TE-VB Leasing	22	13	2	7	254	195	28
6.	Betonút-Ferencvárosi TC	22	11	1	10	243	183	23
7.	Szolnoki VSC	22	7	4	11	200	237	18
8.	Szentesi VK	22	8	1	13	178	227	17
9.	Pécsi VSK-Fűszért	22	7	0	15	185	239	14
10.	BVSC	22	6	0	16	191	253	12
11.	OSC-Kaposvár	22	2	2	18	167	318	6
12.	Neptun VSC	22	0	0	22	132	396	0

Championship Playoff
European competition Playoff
Relegation Playoff

Pld - Played; W - Won; L - Lost; PF - Points for; PA - Points against; Diff - Difference; Pts - Points.

== Championship Playoff ==
Semifinals
1	Domino-Bp. Honvéd	10	11
4	Szeged-Beton VE	3	5
2	TEVA-Vasas SC-Plaket	8	7	14	8
3	Brendon-Fenstherm-ZF-Egri VK	6	9	10	5

Final
1	Domino-Bp. Honvéd	8	8	15	9	8
2	TEVA-Vasas SC-Plaket	10	9	5	8	6
Third place
4	Szeged-Beton VE	6	6	10	-	-
3	Brendon-Fenstherm-ZF-Egri VK	10	5	14	-	-

OB I 2005–06
Champions

Honvéd
6th Title

István Gergely, Bulcsú Székely, Olivér Kovács, Márton Szivós, Rajmund Fodor,
Attila Bárány, Gergely Kiss, Tibor Benedek, Tamás Molnár, Attila Vári,
Viktor Paján, Balázs Hárai, Péter Biros, Zsolt Györke
Coach: István Kovács

== European competition Playoff ==
Placement Semifinals
5	Újpesti TE-VB Leasing	12	8
8	Szentesi VK	4	5
6	Betonút-Ferencvárosi TC	10	11	13
7	Szolnoki VSC	9	13	8

Fifth place
5	Újpesti TE-VB Leasing	13	15
6	Betonút-Ferencvárosi TC	8	7
Seventh place
8	Szentesi VK	9	8
7	Szolnoki VSC	13	12

== Relegation Playoff ==
Placement Semifinals
9	Pécsi VSK-Fűszért	23	10
12	Neptun VSC	12	9
10	BVSC	11	10
11	OSC-Kaposvár	8	7

Ninth place
9	Pécsi VSK-Fűszért	12	6	14
10	BVSC	7	7	11
Relegation play-offs
12	Neptun VSC	7	4
11	OSC-Kaposvár	15	9

== Sources ==
- Magyar sportévkönyv 2007
