= 2002–03 Országos Bajnokság I (men's water polo) =

Water polo league season

OB I
- Season: 2002–03
- Champions: Honvéd
- Euroleague: Honvéd; Vasas; BVSC

2002–03 Országos Bajnokság I (men's water polo) was the 97th water polo championship in Hungary.

== First stage ==
#	Team	M	W	D	L	G+	G−	P
1.	Domino-Bp. Honvéd	22	18	3	1	260	110	39
2.	Vasas SC-Plaket-Euroleasing	22	18	3	1	256	101	39
3.	BVSC-Brendon	22	16	4	2	227	131	36
4.	Ferencvárosi TC-VMAX	22	14	3	5	196	111	31
5.	Újpesti TE-Taxi2000	22	13	3	6	194	165	29
6.	Szeged-Beton VE	22	14	0	8	185	144	28
7.	OSC-British Knights	22	7	1	14	147	218	15
8.	ZF Hungária-Egri VK	22	6	1	15	124	207	13
9.	Kontavill-Szentesi VK	22	5	2	15	134	196	12
10.	Szolnoki VSC	22	5	2	15	134	196	12
11.	Ceglédi VSE-Geosaurus	22	2	2	18	101	214	6
12.	Kecskeméti VSC	22	1	2	19	112	260	4

Championship Playoff
Relegation

Pld - Played; W - Won; L - Lost; PF - Points for; PA - Points against; Diff - Difference; Pts - Points.

== Championship Playoff ==
Semifinals
1	Domino-BHSE	8	11	9	9
4	FTC-VMAX	4	13	5	8
2	Vasas-Plaket-Euroleasing	11	5	12	7	6
3	BVSC-Brendon	9	8	11	10	5

Final
1	Domino-BHSE	13	6	13	9
2	Vasas-Plaket-Euroleasing	10	7	10	7

=== Final ===
- 1st leg

17 April :	Report	Domino-BHSE	13–10	Vasas-Plaket-Euroleasing	Kőér utca, Budapest; Attendance: 1,800; Referees: Bátori, Z. Székely
17 April :	Report	Score by quarters: 6–4, 1–3, 3–2, 3–1			Kőér utca, Budapest; Attendance: 1,800; Referees: Bátori, Z. Székely
17 April :	Report	Biros 4	Goals	D. Varga, Madaras 2	Kőér utca, Budapest; Attendance: 1,800; Referees: Bátori, Z. Székely

- 2nd leg

22 April :	Report	Vasas-Plaket-Euroleasing	7–6	Domino-BHSE	"Komjádi Béla", Budapest
22 April :	Report	Score by quarters: 3–2, 2–1, 1–1, 1–2			"Komjádi Béla", Budapest
22 April :	Report	Á. Steinmetz, Madaras 2	Goals	T. Molnár 3	"Komjádi Béla", Budapest

== Final standing ==
Qualified for the 2003–04 LEN Euroleague
Qualified for the 2003–04 LEN Cup
Relegation to the 2003–04 OB I/B

Rank	Team
1st place, gold medalist(s)	Domino-BHSE
2nd place, silver medalist(s)	Vasas-Plaket-Euroleasing
3rd place, bronze medalist(s)	BVSC-Brendon
4	FTC-VMAX
5	UTE-Taxi 2000
6	Szeged-Beton VE
7	OSC-British Knights
8	ZF Hungária-Egri VK
9	Kontavill-Szentesi VK
10	Ceglédi VSE-Geosaurus
11	Szolnoki VSC
12	Kecskeméti VSC

2002–03 OB I Champions

Domino-BHSE
3rd Title

Attila Bárány, Miklós Bereczki, Péter Biros, Rajmund Fodor, Ottó Frikk
István Gergely, Gergely Kiss, Olivér Kovács, Zoltán Kovács
Tamás Molnár, Sándor Sugár, Márton Szívós
Imre Tóth, Attila Vári
Head coach
István Kovács

== Sources ==
- Magyar sportévkönyv 2004
