= 2010 Magyar Kupa (men's water polo) =

Water polo tournament season

Tournament details
- Country: Hungary
- Teams: 16

Final positions
- Champions: Grupama Honvéd
- Runners-up: ZF-Eger

Tournament statistics
- Top goal scorer(s): (Hungary) László Weszelovszky (21 goals)

The 2010 Magyar Kupa, known as (Hungarian: Theodora Férfi Magyar Kupa) for sponsorship reasons, is the 84th edition of the tournament.

== Quarter-finals ==
Quarter-final matches were played on 16 and 17 October 2010.

Team 1	Agg.	Team 2	1st leg	2nd leg
Pécsi Vízmű PVSK-Füszért (I)	13–22	ZF-Eger (I)	9–13	4–9
Szolnoki Főiskola-KÖZGÉP VSC (I)	16–17	Szeged Beton VE (I)	9–8	7–9
TEVA-VasasPlaket (I)	15–16	Grupama Honvéd (I)	5–5	10–11
FTC-Fisher Klíma (I)	30–17	BVSC-Zugló (I)	15–7	15–10

== Final four ==
The final four will be held on 20 and 21 November 2010 at the Szőnyi úti uszoda in Budapest.

Semifinals
20 November, 17:00
FTC-Fisher Klíma	7
Grupama Honvéd	9
20 November, 18:30
ZF-Eger	9
Szeged Beton VE	3

Final
21 November, 17:00
Grupama Honvéd	9
ZF-Eger	6

=== Semi-finals ===
20 November; 17:00	Report	FTC-Fisher Klíma	7–9	Grupama Honvéd	Szőnyi úti uszoda, Budapest; Referees: dr. Fekete, Marjay
20 November; 17:00	Report	Score by quarters: 1–1, 1–3, 3–3, 2–2			Szőnyi úti uszoda, Budapest; Referees: dr. Fekete, Marjay
20 November; 17:00	Report	Czigány, Weszelovszky 2	Goals	Bátori 4	Szőnyi úti uszoda, Budapest; Referees: dr. Fekete, Marjay

20 November; 18:30	Report	ZF-Eger	9–3	Szeged Beton VE	Szőnyi úti uszoda, Budapest; Referees: Horváth, Petik
20 November; 18:30	Report	Score by quarters: 2–0, 0–0, 2–1, 5–2			Szőnyi úti uszoda, Budapest; Referees: Horváth, Petik
20 November; 18:30	Report	Hosnyánszky, Graham 2	Goals	Török 2	Szőnyi úti uszoda, Budapest; Referees: Horváth, Petik

=== Final ===
21 November; 17:00	Report	Grupama Honvéd	9–6	ZF-Eger	Szőnyi úti uszoda, Budapest; Referees: ifj. Juhász, Kun
21 November; 17:00	Report	Score by quarters: 3–2, 2–2, 2–1, 2–1			Szőnyi úti uszoda, Budapest; Referees: ifj. Juhász, Kun
21 November; 17:00	Report	Szívós 3	Goals	Biros 3	Szőnyi úti uszoda, Budapest; Referees: ifj. Juhász, Kun

2010 Magyar Kupa
Winner

Grupama Honvéd
8th Title

1 István Gergely, 2 Bulcsú Székely, 3 Zoltán Vereczkey, 4 Zoltán Mátyás, 5 Ferenc Salamon, 6 Bence Bátori, 7 Dávid Jansik, 8 Márton Szívós, 9 Márton Tóth, 10 Miklós Gór-Nagy, 11 Dániel Angyal, 12 Balázs Hárai, 13 dr. László Hangody, 14 Márton Lévai
Head coach
Lajos Vad

== See also ==
- 2010–11 Országos Bajnokság I
