= Márton Szívós =

Hungarian water polo player

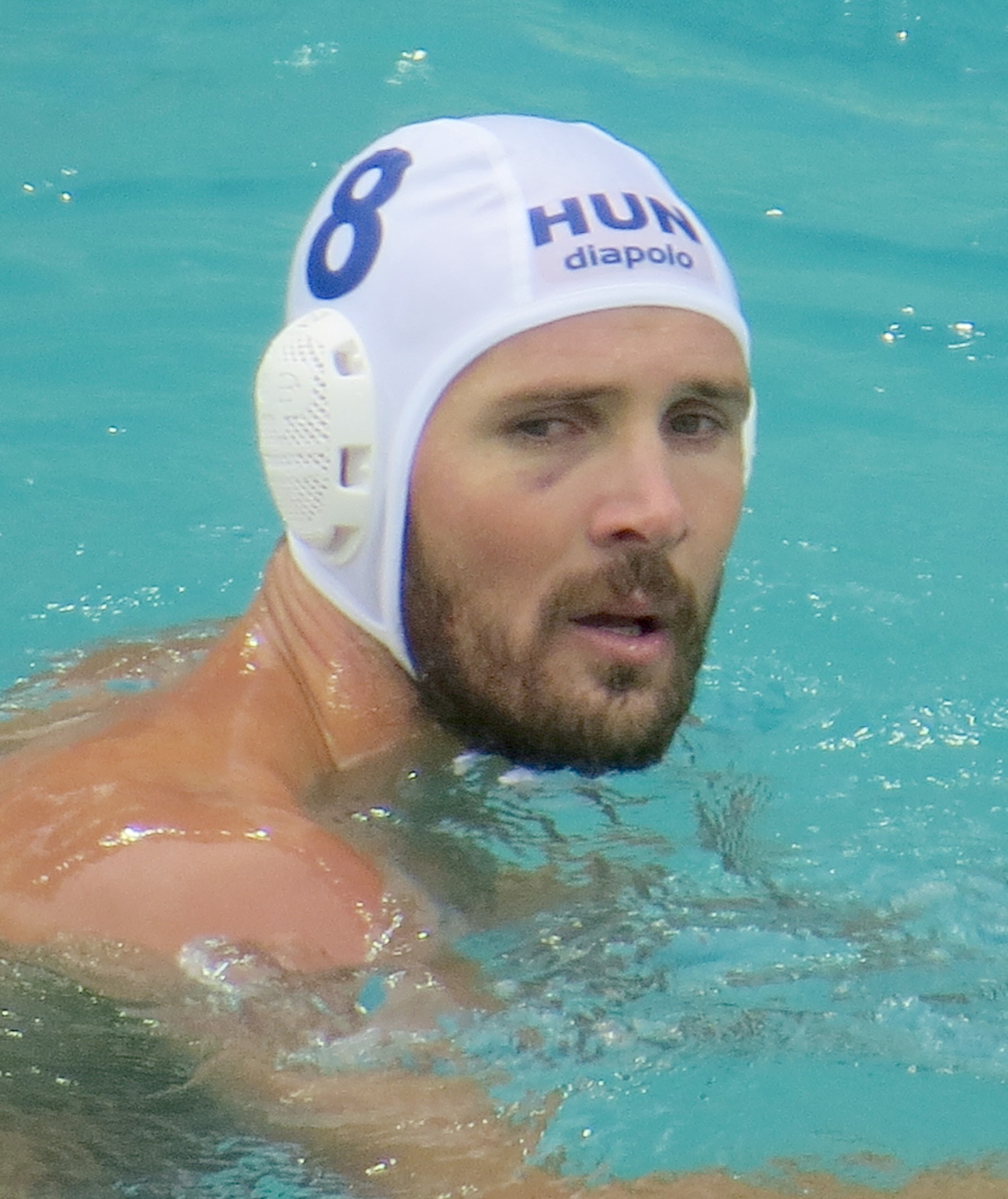
- Szívós at the 2016 Olympics

Personal information
- Nickname: Marci
- Nationality: Hungarian
- Born: 19 August 1981 (age 45) Budapest, Hungary
- Height: 1.93 m (6 ft 4 in)

Sport
- Sport: Water polo
- Handedness: Right
- Position: Wing
- Current club: Bp. Honvéd (head coach)

Youth career
- Years: Team
- 1990–: KSI

Senior clubs
- Years: Team
- –2000: KSI
- 2000–2005: Bp. Honvéd
- 2005–2006: Pro Recco
- 2006–2012: Bp. Honvéd
- 2012–2014: Szeged
- 2014–2016: Eger
- 2016–2020: Bp. Honvéd
National team
- Years: Team
- 2003–2016: Hungary

Teams coached
- 2020–present: Bp. Honvéd
Medal record
Representing Hungary
Men's water polo
World Championships
Gold medal – first place	2013 Barcelona	Team
Silver medal – second place	2005 Montréal	Team
Silver medal – second place	2007 Montréal	Team
European Championships
Silver medal – second place	2006 Belgrade	Team
Bronze medal – third place	2012 Eindhoven	Team
Silver medal – second place	2014 Budapest	Team
Summer Universiade
Gold medal – first place	2003 Daegu	Team
- Updated on 2 August 2023

Márton Szivós (born 19 August 1981) is a Hungarian water polo player. He is part of the national team since 2003 and competed at the 2012 and 2016 Olympics. He is a son of István Szívós, Jr. and a grandson of István Szívós, both of whom won Olympic gold medals in water polo.

Szivós served in Hungarian Army. In 2012 he received a Silver Cross of the Order of Merit of the Republic of Hungary. In April 2014 he suffered chest pains during a local match. He was taken to a hospital, where he was diagnosed as having suffered a heart attack and underwent surgery.

== Honours ==
=== National ===
- World Championships: Gold medal - 2013; Silver medal - 2005, 2007
- European Championship: Silver medal - 2006, 2014; Bronze medal - 2012
- FINA World League: Gold medal - 2004; Silver medal - 2005, 2013, 2014
- FINA World Cup: Silver medal - 2006
- Universiade: (Gold medal - 2003)
- Junior World Championships: (Bronze medal - 2001)
- Youth European Championship: (Gold medal - 1997; Bronze medal - 1999)

=== Club ===
Bp. Honvéd (Domino-BHSE)

- Hungarian Championship (5x): 2000–01, 2001–02, 2002–03, 2003–04, 2004–05
- LEN Euroleague (1x): 2003–04
- LEN Super Cup (1x): 2004

Pro Recco

- Italian Championship (1x): 2005–06
- Italian Cup (1x): 2005–06
- LEN Euroleague runners-up: 2005–06

Bp. Honvéd (Domino-Honvéd, Grupama Honvéd)

- Hungarian Cup (2x): 2006, 2010

Szeged (A-HÍD Szeged, Diapolo Szeged)

- Hungarian Cup (2x): 2012, 2013

Eger (ZF-Eger)

- Hungarian Cup (1x): 2015

== Awards ==
- LEN Champions League Final Four MVP: 2005–06 with Pro Recco
- Faragó-díj (2000)
- Golden Waterpolo wandering Award (2009)
- National Defence awards (2012)

Orders

- Silver Cross of the Cross of Merit of Hungary (2012)

== See also ==
- List of world champions in men's water polo
- List of World Aquatics Championships medalists in water polo
