= István Gergely =

Hungarian water polo player (born 1976)

Personal information
- Nationality: Hungarian, Slovakia
- Born: 20 August 1976 (age 50) Dunajská Streda, Czechoslovakia
- Height: 2.01 m (6 ft 7 in)

Sport
- Sport: Water polo
- Handedness: Right
- Position: Goalkeeper
- Current club: Bp. Honvéd (president)

Youth career
- Years: Team
- –: KVP Komárno

Senior clubs
- Years: Team
- –1994: KVP Komárno
- 1994–1997: Slávia UK Bratislava
- 1997–1999: NCHZ Nováky
- 1999–2000: Cagliari
- 2000–2002: CN Terrassa
- 2002–2014: RacioNet Honvéd
National team
Years	Team	Apps
1993–2002	Slovakia	130
2002–2011	Hungary	

Teams coached
- 2013–2016: Hungary (goalkeeping)
- 2017–: Bp. Honvéd (president)
Medal record
Men's water polo
Representing Hungary
Olympic Games
Gold medal – first place	2004 Athens	Team competition
Gold medal – first place	2008 Beijing	Team competition
World Championships
Gold medal – first place	2003 Barcelona	Team competition
Silver medal – second place	2005 Montréal	Team competition

István Gergely (Hungarian: Gergely István; born 20 August 1976 in Dunajská Streda, Czechoslovakia) is a Hungarian water polo player who was born in Czechslovakia. He was a member of the gold medal-winning Hungary national team at the 2004 and 2008 Olympics. He also represented Slovakia national team at the 2000 Olympics.

== Honours ==
=== National ===
- Olympic Games:
  - gold medal – 2004, 2008
- World Championships:
  - gold medal – 2003
  - silver medal – 2005
- FINA World League:
  - gold medal – 2003, 2004
  - silver medal – 2005

=== Club ===
- Euroleague champion: 2004 (Budapesti Honvéd SE)
- LEN Super Cup winner: 2004 (Budapesti Honvéd SE)
- Hungarian championship (OB I): 2003, 2004, 2005, 2006 (Budapesti Honvéd SE)
- Hungarian Cup (Magyar Kupa): 2006, 2010 (Budapesti Honvéd SE)

== Awards ==
- Member of the Hungarian team of the year: 2003, 2004, 2008

Orders

- Officer's Cross of the Order of Merit of the Republic of Hungary (2004)
- Commander's Cross of the Order of Merit of the Republic of Hungary (2008)

== See also ==
- Hungary men's Olympic water polo team records and statistics
- List of Olympic champions in men's water polo
- List of Olympic medalists in water polo (men)
- List of men's Olympic water polo tournament goalkeepers
- List of world champions in men's water polo
- List of World Aquatics Championships medalists in water polo
