= 2001–02 Országos Bajnokság I (men's water polo) =

Water polo league season

OB I
- Season: 2001–02
- Champions: Honvéd

2001–02 Országos Bajnokság I (men's water polo) was the 96th water polo championship in Hungary.

== First stage ==
#	Team	M	W	D	L	G+	G−	P
1.	Domino-Bp. Honvéd	12	12	0	0	184	69	24
2.	Vasas SC-Plaket	12	11	0	1	154	61	22
3.	BVSC-Brendon	12	10	0	2	134	81	20
4.	Ferencvárosi TC-VMAX	12	8	1	3	108	73	17
5.	Újpesti TE-Humet	12	7	1	4	114	85	15
6.	Tabán Trafik-Szegedi VE	12	6	1	5	99	89	13
7.	OSC-British Knights	12	6	0	6	95	103	12
8.	Kontavill-Szentesi VK	12	5	1	6	99	111	11
9.	UPC-Egri VK	12	5	0	7	84	95	10
10.	Szolnoki VSC	12	3	0	8	93	131	6
11.	Kecskeméti VSC	12	1	1	10	60	133	3
12.	Csanádi Árpád KSI	12	0	2	10	60	137	2
13.	Tatabányai SC	12	0	1	11	59	175	1

Championship Round
Relegation Round

Pld - Played; W - Won; L - Lost; PF - Points for; PA - Points against; Diff - Difference; Pts - Points.

== Second stage ==
=== Championship Round ===
#	Team	M	W	D	L	G+	G−	P
1.	Domino-Bp. Honvéd	26	22	2	2	358	176	46
2.	Vasas SC-Plaket	26	21	2	3	282	140	44
3.	BVSC-Brendon	26	18	2	6	251	170	38
4.	Ferencvárosi TC-VMAX	26	18	1	7	240	172	37
5.	Újpesti TE-Humet	26	11	2	13	208	210	24
6.	Tabán Trafik-Szegedi VE	26	11	2	13	185	212	24
7.	OSC-British Knights	26	8	2	16	184	244	18
8.	Kontavill-Szentesi VK	26	6	3	17	190	259	15

Championship Round

Pld - Played; W - Won; L - Lost; PF - Points for; PA - Points against; Diff - Difference; Pts - Points.

=== Relegation Round ===
#	Team	M	W	D	L	G+	G−	P
9.	UPC-Egri VK	24	14	1	9	187	166	29
10.	Szolnoki VSC	24	12	1	11	210	212	25
11.	Kecskeméti VSC	24	4	3	17	135	223	11
12.	Csanádi Árpád KSI	24	4	2	18	142	234	10
13.	Tatabányai SC	24	2	3	19	144	298	7

Relegation

Pld - Played; W - Won; L - Lost; PF - Points for; PA - Points against; Diff - Difference; Pts - Points.

== Championship Playoff ==
Semifinals								Final
1	Bp. Honvéd-Domino	10	9
4	Ferencvárosi TC-VMAX	9	5					1	Bp. Honvéd-Domino	7	6	7	10	11	-	-
2	Vasas SC-Plaket	8	9	8	9	9	7	2	Vasas SC-Plaket	9	10	5	9	9	-	-
3	BVSC-Brendon	9	6	6	5	10	5

== Final standing ==
Qualified for the 2002–03 LEN Champions League
Qualified for the 2002–03 LEN Cup Winners' Cup
Qualified for the 2002–03 LEN Cup
Relegation to the 2002–03 OB I/B

Rank	Team
1st place, gold medalist(s)	Domino-BHSE
2nd place, silver medalist(s)	Vasas-Plaket
3rd place, bronze medalist(s)	BVSC-Brendon
4	FTC-VMAX
5	Tabán Trafik-Szegedi VE
6	UTE-Taxi 2000
7	OSC-British Knights
8	Kontavill-Szentesi VK
9	UPC-Egri VK
10	Szolnoki VSC
11	Kecskeméti VSC
12	Csanádi Árpád KSI
13	Tatabányai VSE

2001–02 OB I Champions

Domino-BHSE
2nd Title

Attila Bárány, Miklós Bereczki, Péter Biros, Gábor Gombos, Gábor Jäger
Gergely Kiss, Olivér Kovács, Zoltán Kovács, Balázs Pelle
Tamás Molnár, Sándor Sugár, Márton Szívós
Attila Takács, Imre Tóth
Head coach
István Kovács

== Sources ==
- Magyar sportévkönyv 2003
