= Ádám Steinmetz =

Hungarian water polo player

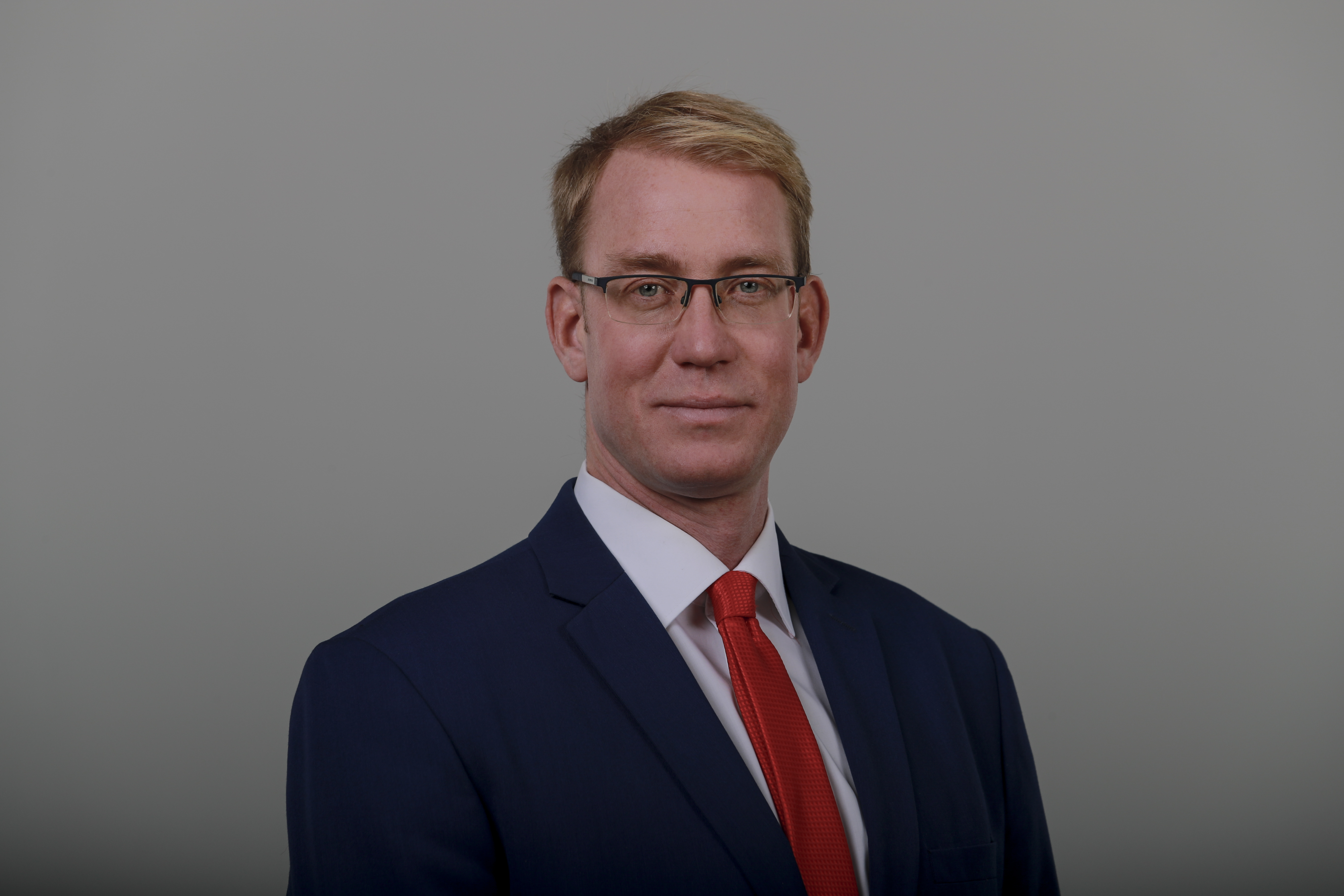

Personal information
- Nickname: Ádi
- Nationality: Hungarian
- Born: 11 August 1980 (age 46) Budapest, Hungary
- Height: 1.94 m (6 ft 4 1/2 in)

Sport
- Sport: Water polo
- Handedness: Right
- Position: Centre forward

Youth career
- Years: Team
- –: KSI

Senior clubs
- Years: Team
- –1996: KSI
- 1996–2000: FTC-Thomas Jeans
- 2000–2008: TEVA-VasasPlaket
- 2008–2011: Primorac Kotor
- 2011–2018: VasasPlaket
National team
- Years: Team
- –: Hungary
Medal record
Men's water polo
Representing Hungary
Olympic Games
Gold medal – first place	2004 Athens	Team competition
World Championships
Silver medal – second place	2005 Montréal	Team competition
European Championship
Bronze medal – third place	2012 Eindhoven	Team competition

Ádám Steinmetz (born 11 August 1980 in Budapest) is a Hungarian water polo player, Olympic champion, and politician, who played for Hungarian Championship outfit Vasas SC. He has a brother, Barnabás Steinmetz, who is also a water polo player and two-time Olympic gold medalist. Between 2018 and 2022, he was a member of the National Assembly, in the parliamentary group of Jobbik.

== Honours ==
=== National ===
- Olympic Games: Gold medal - 2004
- World Championships: Silver medal - 2005
- European Championship: Silver medal - 2006; Bronze medal - 2003, 2012
- Universiade: (Gold medal - 2003; Bronze medal - 1999, 2001)
- Junior World Championships: (Silver medal - 1997)
- Junior European Championship: (Silver medal - 1996)
- Youth European Championship: (Silver medal - 1995)

=== Club ===
- Euroleague Winners (1): (2009 - with Primorac Kotor)
- Cup Winners' Cup Winners (2): (1998 - with FTC; 2002 - with Vasas)
- LEN Super Cup Winner (1): (2009 - with Primorac Kotor)
- Hungarian Championship (OB I): 4x (2000 - with FTC; 2007, 2008, 2012 - with Vasas)
- Hungarian Cup (Magyar Kupa): 5x (1996 - with FTC; 2001, 2002, 2004, 2005 - with Vasas)
- Montenegrin Cup (Kup Crne Gore): 1x (2010 - with Primorac Kotor)

== Awards ==
- Masterly youth athlete: 1997, 1998
- Member of the Hungarian team of year: 2004
- Perpetual Champion of Vasas SC (2005)
- Ministerial Certificate of Merit (2012)

Orders

- Officer's Cross of the Order of Merit of the Republic of Hungary (2004)

== See also ==
- Hungary men's Olympic water polo team records and statistics
- List of Olympic champions in men's water polo
- List of Olympic medalists in water polo (men)
- List of World Aquatics Championships medalists in water polo
