= Tibor Benedek =

Hungarian water polo player and coach (1972–2020)

Personal information
- Born: 12 July 1972 Budapest, Hungary
- Died: 18 June 2020 (aged 47) Budapest, Hungary
- Height: 1.90 m (6 ft 3 in)

Sport
- Sport: Water polo
- Handedness: Left
- Position: Wing

Youth career
- Years: Team
- 1980–: KSI

Senior clubs
- Years: Team
- –1989: KSI
- 1989–1996: UTE-Office & Home
- 1996–2001: INA Assitalia Roma
- 2001–2004: Pro Recco
- 2004–2007: Domino-BHSE
- 2006: → Sliema (Summer League)
- 2007–2012: Pro Recco
National team
Years	Team	Apps
1990–2008	Hungary	384

Teams coached
- 2010–2012: Hungary (assistant)
- 2013–2016: Hungary
- 2018–2020: UVSE-Hunguest Hotels
Medal record
Men's water polo
Representing Hungary
Olympic Games
Gold medal – first place	2000 Sydney	Team competition
Gold medal – first place	2004 Athens	Team competition
Gold medal – first place	2008 Beijing	Team competition
World Championships
Gold medal – first place	2003 Barcelona	Team competition
Silver medal – second place	1998 Perth	Team competition
Silver medal – second place	2007 Melbourne	Team competition
Bronze medal – third place	1991 Perth	Team competition
European Championship
Gold medal – first place	1997 Sevilla	Team competition
Silver medal – second place	1993 Sheffield	Team competition
Silver medal – second place	1995 Vienna	Team competition
Silver medal – second place	2006 Belgrade	Team competition
Bronze medal – third place	2001 Budapest	Team competition
Bronze medal – third place	2003 Kranj	Team competition
Bronze medal – third place	2008 Málaga	Team competition
FINA World Cup
Gold medal – first place	1995 Atlanta	Team competition
Silver medal – second place	1993 Athens	Team competition
Silver medal – second place	2002 Belgrade	Team competition
Bronze medal – third place	1997 Athens	Team competition

Tibor Benedek (12 July 1972 – 18 June 2020) was a Hungarian professional water polo player and coach, widely regarded as one of the greatest players of all time. He played on the gold medal squads at the 2000 Summer Olympics, 2004 Summer Olympics and 2008 Summer Olympics. Benedek also competed at the 1992 and 1996 Summer Olympics, where the Hungarian team placed 6th and 4th, respectively.

Benedek was the head coach of Hungary men's national water polo team between 2013 and 2016.

Benedek was named Hungarian Water Polo Player of the Year in 1992, 1993 and 1994. He made his debut for the national side in 1990. His father, Miklós Benedek, was an actor.

Widely regarded as one of the greatest water polo players of all time, Benedek ranks second on the all-time scoring list in Olympic history, with 65 goals. He was the joint top goalscorer at the 1992 Barcelona Olympics, with 22 goals, and the top goalscorer at the 1996 Atlanta Olympics, with 19 goals. Benedek is the ninth player to compete in water polo at five Olympics, and one of ten male athletes who won three Olympic gold medals in water polo. In 2016, he was inducted in the International Swimming Hall of Fame.

Tibor Benedek died on 18 June 2020 due to pancreatic cancer. His death was announced by the Hungarian Water Polo Federation.

== Honours ==
=== As player ===
==== National ====
- Olympic Games: Gold medal – 2000, 2004, 2008
- World Championships: Gold medal – 2003; Silver medal – 1998, 2007; Bronze medal – 1991
- European Championship: Gold medal – 1997; Silver medal – 1993, 1995; Bronze medal – 2001, 2003, 2008
- FINA World League: Gold medal – 2003, 2004; Silver medal – 2007; Bronze medal – 2002
- FINA World Cup: Gold medal – 1995; Silver medal – 1993, 2002; Bronze medal – 1997

384 present in the national team of Hungary

- Junior World Championships: (Bronze medal – 1991)
- Junior European Championship: (Bronze medal – 1990)
- Youth European Championship: (Gold medal – 1989)

==== Club ====
Újpest (UTE-Primavera, UTE-Office & Home)

- Hungarian Championship (4x): 1990–91, 1992–93, 1993–94, 1994–95
- Hungarian Cup (2x): 1990–91, 1992–93
- European Cup (1x): 1993–94
- LEN Cup (1x): 1992–93
- LEN Super Cup (1x): 1994

Racing Roma (INA Assitalia Roma)

- Italian Championship (1x): 1998–99
- LEN Cup Winners' Cup runners-up: 1996–97

Pro Recco

- Italian Championship (1x): 2001–02
- LEN Euroleague (1x): 2002–03

Bp. Honvéd (Domino-BHSE)

- Hungarian Championship (3x): 2004–05, 2005–06
- Hungarian Cup (1x): 2006
- Hungarian Super Cup (1x): 2005

Pro Recco (Ferla Pro Recco)

- Italian Championship (5x): 2007–08, 2008–09, 2009–10, 2010–11, 2011–12
- Italian Cup (4x): 2007–08, 2008–09, 2009–10, 2010–11
- LEN Champions League (3x): 2007–08, 2009–10, 2011–12
- LEN Super Cup (3x): 2007, 2008, 2010
- Adriatic League (1x): 2011–12

=== As head coach ===
Hungary (2013–2016)

- World Championships: Gold medal – 2013
- European Championship: Silver medal – 2014; Bronze medal – 2016
- FINA World League: Silver medal – 2013, 2014
- FINA World Cup: Silver medal – 2014

== Awards ==
- Total-waterpolo magazine's man water polo "World Player of the Year's2000–20" award
- Member of the Best Team of the Year's in the World by total-waterpolo 2000–20
- Masterly youth athlete: 1991
- Hungarian Water Polo Player of the Year: 1992, 1993, 1994, 2002
- Member of the Hungarian team of year: 1993, 1997, 2000, 2003, 2004, 2008
- Honorary Citizen of Budapest (2008)
- Hungarian head coach of the Year: 2013
- Member of International Swimming Hall of Fame (2016)

Orders

- Officer's Cross of the Order of Merit of the Republic of Hungary (2000)
- Commander's Cross of the Order of Merit of the Republic of Hungary (2004)
- Commander's Cross of the Order of Merit of the Republic of Hungary with the Star (2008)

== See also ==
- Hungary men's Olympic water polo team records and statistics
- List of athletes with the most appearances at Olympic Games
- List of players who have appeared in multiple men's Olympic water polo tournaments
- List of multiple Olympic gold medalists in one event
- List of Olympic champions in men's water polo
- List of Olympic medalists in water polo (men)
- List of men's Olympic water polo tournament top goalscorers
- List of world champions in men's water polo
- List of World Aquatics Championships medalists in water polo
- List of members of the International Swimming Hall of Fame
