= Tamás Molnár =

Hungarian water polo player

Personal information
- Nickname: Papesz
- Nationality: Hungarian
- Born: 2 August 1975 (age 51) Szeged, Hungary
- Height: 1.92 m (6 ft 3 1/2 in)

Sport
- Sport: Water polo
- Handedness: Right
- Position: Centre forward

Youth career
- Years: Team
- –: Szeged

Senior clubs
- Years: Team
- –1998: Tabán Trafik-Szeged
- 1998–1999: UTE-Taxi 2000
- 1999–2000: Jug Dubrovnik
- 2000–2001: NIS Naftagas-Bečej
- 2001–2009: Domino-Honvéd
- 2009–2014: Diapolo Szeged
- 2010–2014: → Neptunes (Summer League)
National team
- Years: Team
- 1995–2008: Hungary
Medal record
Men's water polo
Representing Hungary
Olympic Games
Gold medal – first place	2000 Sydney	Team competition
Gold medal – first place	2004 Athens	Team competition
Gold medal – first place	2008 Beijing	Team competition
World Championships
Gold medal – first place	2003 Barcelona	Team competition
Silver medal – second place	2005 Montréal	Team competition
Silver medal – second place	2007 Melbourne	Team competition
FINA World League
Gold medal – first place	2003 New York	Team competition
Silver medal – second place	2007 Berlin	Team competition
FINA World Cup
Silver medal – second place	2002 Belgrade	Team competition
Silver medal – second place	2006 Budapest	Team competition

Tamás Molnár (born 2 August 1975) is a Hungarian former water polo player, who played on the gold medal squads at the 2000 Summer Olympics, 2004 Summer Olympics and 2008 Summer Olympics. He is one of ten male athletes who won three Olympic gold medals in water polo. He made his debut for the national team in 1997, and was named Hungarian Water Polo Player of the Year in 1998.

He won the Malta Waterpolo Summer League title with Neptunes Emirates (St. Julians, MALTA) in 2010-14. With this he earned a national record of winning 5 leagues in succession for the club previously unachieved by any other team, making him one of the most successful foreign players for the club as well as to play in the country in the sports local history.

== Honours ==
=== National ===
- Olympic Games: Gold medal - 2000, 2004, 2008
- World Championships: Gold medal - 2003; Silver medal - 1998, 2005, 2007
- European Championship: Gold medal - 1997, 1999; Silver medal - 2006; Bronze medal - 2001, 2003, 2008
- FINA World League: Gold medal - 2003, 2004; Bronze medal - 2002
- FINA World Cup: Gold medal - 1999; Silver medal - 2002, 2006; Bronze medal - 1997
- Universiade: (Silver medal - 1995)
- Junior World Championships: (Gold medal - 1995)
- Junior European Championship: (Gold medal - 1992, 1994)

=== Club ===
Újpest (UTE-Taxi 2000)

- LEN Cup (1x): 1998–99

Jug Dubrovnik

- Croatian Championship (1x): 1999–2000
- LEN Cup (1x): 1999–2000

Bečej

- FR Yugoslav Championship (1x): 2000–01
- FR Yugoslav Cup (1x): 2000–01

Bp. Honvéd (Domino-BHSE)

- Hungarian Championship (5x): 2001–02, 2002–03, 2003–04, 2004–05, 2005–06
- Hungarian Cup (1x): 2006
- Hungarian Super Cup (1x): 2005
- LEN Euroleague (1x): 2003–04
- LEN Super Cup (1x): 2004

Szeged (A-HÍD Szeged, Diapolo Szeged)

- Hungarian Cup (3x): 2011, 2012, 2013

Neptunes - only in Summer League

- Maltese Summer League (5x): 2010, 2011, 2012, 2013, 2014
- Maltese Knockout title (3x): 2011, 2012, 2014
- Maltese President's Cup (3x): 2011, 2013, 2014

=== Individual ===
- OB I top scorer (Hungarian Championship): 2009–10

== Awards ==
- Masterly youth athlete: 1995
- Member of the Hungarian team of year: 1997, 1999, 2000, 2003, 2004, 2008
- Hungarian Water Polo Player of the Year: 1998
- Honorary Citizen of Budapest (2008)
- Member of International Swimming Hall of Fame (2015)

Orders

- Officer's Cross of the Order of Merit of the Republic of Hungary (2000)
- Commander's Cross of the Order of Merit of the Republic of Hungary (2004)
- Commander's Cross of the Order of Merit of the Republic of Hungary with the Star (2008)

== See also ==
- Hungary men's Olympic water polo team records and statistics
- List of multiple Olympic gold medalists in one event
- List of Olympic champions in men's water polo
- List of Olympic medalists in water polo (men)
- List of world champions in men's water polo
- List of World Aquatics Championships medalists in water polo
- List of members of the International Swimming Hall of Fame
