= Dániel Angyal =

Hungarian water polo player

Personal information
- Full name: Dániel Angyal
- Nationality: Hungarian
- Born: 29 March 1992 (age 34) Budapest, Hungary
- Height: 203 cm (80 in)
- Weight: 104 kg (229 lb)

Sport
- Sport: Water polo
- Handedness: Right
- Position: Driver
- Current club: Marseille

Youth career
- Years: Team
- –: KSI

Senior clubs
- Years: Team
- –2010: KSI
- 2010–2012: Bp. Honvéd
- 2012–2014: Vasas
- 2014–2018: Eger
- 2018–2022: Szolnok
- 2022–2023: OSC-Újbuda
- 2023–present: Marseille
National team
Years	Team	Apps	(Gls)
2016–	Hungary	159	(104)
Medal record
Men's water polo
Representing Hungary
Olympic Games
Bronze medal – third place	2020 Tokyo	Team
World Championships
Gold medal – first place	2023 Fukuoka	Team
Silver medal – second place	2025 Singapore	Team
European Championship
Silver medal – second place	2022 Split
Silver medal – second place	2026 Belgrade

Dániel Angyal (born 29 March 1992) is a Hungarian water polo player. He competed in the 2020 Summer Olympics.
