= Szegedi VE =

Water polo club in Hungary

- Full name: Szegedi Vízilabda Egyesület
- Founded: 1925; 101 years ago
- League: Országos Bajnokság I
- Based in: Szeged, Hungary
- Arena: Tiszavirág Sportuszoda (Capacity: 1,169)
- Colors: Blue, black and white
- President: Dr. Tamás Molnár
- Head coach: Csaba Kiss
- Championships: 1 Euro Cup; 3 Hungarian Cups
- 2021–22: Országos Bajnokság I, 7th of 14
- Website: szve.hu

Szegedi Vízilabda Egyesület is a water polo club from Szeged, Hungary. The team competes in the Országos Bajnokság I.

== Naming history ==
- Szegedi EOL AK: (... – 1984/85)
- Szegedi EOL-DÉLÉP SE: (1985/86) - Merged with DÉLÉP SC
- Szeged SC: (1986/87 – 1992/93)
- Szegedi VE: (1993/94 – 1995/96)
- Heliomed-Szegedi VE: (1996/97)
- Tabán Trafik-Szegedi VE (1997/98 – 2002/03)
- Szeged-Beton VE: (2002/03 – 2010/11)
- A-Híd Szeged Beton: (2011/12)
- A-Híd Szeged: (2012/13)
- Diapolo Szeged: (2013/14)
- Tiszavirág Szeged Diapolo: (2014/15)
- ContiTech-Szeged Diapolo: (2015/16 – 2016/17)
- ContiTech-Szeged: (2017/18)
- Szegedi VE: (2018/19 – ... )

== Honours ==
=== Domestic competitions ===
- Országos Bajnokság I (National Championship of Hungary)

Third place (7): 1989–90*, 2004–05, 2009–10, 2010–11, 2011–12, 2012–13, 2013–14

- Magyar Kupa (National Cup of Hungary)

Winners (3): 2011, 2012, 2013
Finalist (2): 1980, 2000–01

=== European competitions ===
- LEN Champions League

Quarter-finalist (2): 2011–12, 2012–13

- LEN Euro Cup

Winners (1): 2008–09

== Current squad ==
Season 2020–2021

No.	Nat.	Player	Birth Date	Position	L/R
1	(Hungary)	Marcell Meixner	May 24, 1991 (age 35)	Goalkeeper	
2	(Hungary)	Dániel Sánta	March 20, 1994 (age 32)	Centre forward	
3	(Hungary)	Frank Pellei	March 21, 1996 (age 30)		
	(Hungary)	Bence Zsigri	March 4, 1995 (age 31)		
4	(Hungary)	Tamás Sedlmayer	January 6, 1995 (age 31)		
5	(Hungary)	Gergely Palotás	February 17, 1993 (age 33)	Left side	R
6	(Hungary)	Csaba Kiss (c)	June 6, 1978 (age 48)	Wing	
7	(Serbia)	Miloš Vukićević	April 15, 1988 (age 38)	Centre forward	
8	(Serbia)	Ivan Basara	October 25, 1988 (age 37)		
10	(Hungary)	Ádám Manhercz	November 17, 1993 (age 32)	Left wing	R
11	(Hungary)	Márton Chilkó	July 18, 1990 (age 35)	Right sing	
12	(Hungary)	Sándor Illés	January 22, 1992 (age 34)		
13	(Hungary)	Márton Nagy	December 22, 1992 (age 33)		
14	(Hungary)	Dávid Molnár	March 16, 1993 (age 33)	Goalkeeper	
	(Hungary)	Zoltán Berkó	April 26, 1997 (age 29)		
	(Hungary)	Bence Mikházi	October 6, 1996 (age 29)		

=== Staff ===
Technical Staff
Chairman	(Hungary) dr. Tamás Molnár
Head Coach	(Hungary) Péter Varga
Coach	(Hungary) dr. Ferenc Bóka

=== Transfers (2016-17) ===
Source: vizipolo.hu

In:

- (Hungary) Sándor Illés (from Bp. Honvéd)
- (Serbia) Ivan Basara (from Pécsi VSK)
- (Serbia) Miloš Vukićević (from Partizan)

Out:

- (Croatia) Aljoša Kunac (to POŠK Split)
- (Hungary) Zsolt Varga (to Kaposvár)
- (Slovakia) Lukáš Seman (to OSC)

== Recent seasons ==
As of 11 August 2022.

Season	Tier	League	Pos.	Domestic cup	European competitions	
1984–85	1	OB I	13th	Round of 16		
1985–86	1	OB I	12th	Round of 16		
1986–87	1	OB I	5th	Quarterfinalist		
1987–88	1	OB I	6th	Round of 16		
1988–89	1	OB I	7th	Quarterfinalist		
1989–90	1	OB I	3rd	Round of 16		
1990–91	1	OB I	6th	Quarterfinalist		
1991–92	1	OB I	9th	Round of 16		
1992–93	1	OB I	5th			
1993–94	1	OB I	6th			
1994–95	1	OB I	4th			
1995–96	1	OB I	6th		3 LEN Cup	F
1996–97	1	OB I	5th			
1997–98	1	OB I	5th			
1998–99	1	OB I	10th			
1999–00	2	OB I/B		Quarterfinalist		
2000–01	1	OB I	6th	Runner-up		
2001–02	1	OB I	6th			
2002–03	1	OB I	6th	Semifinalist	3 LEN Cup	
2003–04	1	OB I	6th	did not held	2 LEN Cup	R16
2004–05	1	OB I	3rd			
2005–06	1	OB I	4th		1 Euroleague	QR2
2005–06	1	OB I	4th		2 LEN Cup	R16
2006–07	1	OB I	4th		2 LEN Cup	R16
2007–08	1	OB I	4th		2 LEN Cup	QF
2008–09	1	OB I	5th	Quarterfinalist	2 LEN Cup	C
2009–10	1	OB I	3rd	Semifinalist	LEN Super Cup	F
2009–10	1	OB I	3rd	Semifinalist	2 LEN Cup	R16
2010–11	1	OB I	3rd	Semifinalist	1 Euroleague	PR
2011–12	1	OB I	3rd	Champion	1 Champions League	QF
2012–13	1	OB I	3rd	Champion	1 Champions League	QF
2013–14	1	OB I	3rd	Champion		
2014–15	1	OB I	5th	Quarterfinalist		
2015–16	1	OB I	6th	Semifinalist	2 Euro Cup	SF
2016–17	1	OB I	7th	Quarterfinalist		
2017–18	1	OB I	16th	Preliminary round		
2018–19	2	OB I/B	1st	Preliminary round		
2019–20	1	OB I	13th^{1}	Preliminary round		
2020–21	1	OB I	13th	Preliminary round		
2021–22	1	OB I	7th	Quarterfinalist		
2022–23	1	OB I				

^1 Cancelled due to the COVID-19 pandemic in Hungary.

=== In European competition ===
- Participations in Champions League (Euroleague): 4x
- Participations in Euro Cup (LEN Cup): 9x

Season	Competition	Round	Club	Home	Away	Aggregate
1995-96	LEN Cup; Finalist	Finals	(Italy) Pescara			20–28
2002-03	LEN Cup					
2003-04	LEN Cup	Round of 16	(Hungary) Ferencváros	6-10	10-7	16–17
2005-06	Euroleague	elimination in Second qualifying round				
2005-06	LEN Cup	Round of 16	(Russia) Dynamo Moscow	4-8	3-10	7–18
2006-07	LEN Cup	Round of 16	(Italy) Nervi	8-6	4-9	12–15
2007-08	LEN Cup	Round of 16	(Italy) Catania	12-9	7-8	19–17
2007-08	LEN Cup	Quarter-finals	(Hungary) Eger	11-8	1-5	12–13
2008-09	LEN Cup; Champion	Round of 16	(Montenegro) Akademija Cattaro	8-5	4-5	12–10
2008-09	LEN Cup; Champion	Quarter-finals	(Serbia) Vojvodina	9-8	10-10	19–18
2008-09	LEN Cup; Champion	Semi-finals	(Russia) Sintez Kazan	8-5	10-10	18–15
2008-09	LEN Cup; Champion	Finals	(Greece) Panionios	12-10	6-8	18–18 (5–3 p)
2009-10	LEN Cup	Round of 16	(Hungary) Ferencváros	7-7	9-10	16–17
2010-11	Euroleague	Preliminary round (Group A)	(Montenegro) Jadran Herceg Novi	7–9	10–13	4th place
2010-11	Euroleague	Preliminary round (Group A)	(Hungary) Vasas	9–9	10–11	4th place
2010-11	Euroleague	Preliminary round (Group A)	(Montenegro) Primorac Kotor	7–13	9–9	4th place
2011-12	Champions League	Preliminary round (Group C)	(Serbia) Partizan	9–8	9–8	1st place
2011-12	Champions League	Preliminary round (Group C)	(Hungary) Eger	6–3	10–9	1st place
2011-12	Champions League	Preliminary round (Group C)	(Hungary) Vasas	12–12	9–12	1st place
2011-12	Champions League	Quarter-finals	(Croatia) HAVK Mladost	7-10	6-8	13–18
2012-13	Champions League	Preliminary round (Group D)	(Serbia) Partizan	8–7	6–8	1st place
2012-13	Champions League	Preliminary round (Group D)	(Germany) Spandau 04	8–5	11–7	1st place
2012-13	Champions League	Preliminary round (Group D)	(Romania) CSM Oradea	17–8	14–9	1st place
2012-13	Champions League	Preliminary round (Group D)	(Turkey) Galatasaray	11–8	6–4	1st place
2012-13	Champions League	Round of 16	(France) Montpellier	18-7	9-6	27–13
2012-13	Champions League	Quarter-finals	(Serbia) Crvena zvezda	5-7	11-10	16–17
2015-16	Euro Cup					
2015-16	Euro Cup	Quarter-finals	(Germany) Waspo Hannover	9-3	8-13	17–16
2015-16	Euro Cup	Semi-finals	(Italy) AN Brescia	10-15	8-9	18–24

== Notable former players ==
=== Olympic champions ===
- Rajmund Fodor (1986–1996) - 8 year 2000 Sydney, 2004 Athens
- Tamás Molnár ( –1998, 2009–2014) - 12 year 2000 Sydney, 2004 Athens, 2008 Beijing
- Barnabás Steinmetz (1995–96) - 1 year 2000 Sydney, 2004 Athens
- Norbert Hosnyánszky (2005–2006) - 1 year 2008 Beijing
- Tamás Varga (2007–2009) - 2 year 2004 Athens, 2008 Beijing
