= Bulcsú Székely =

Hungarian water polo player

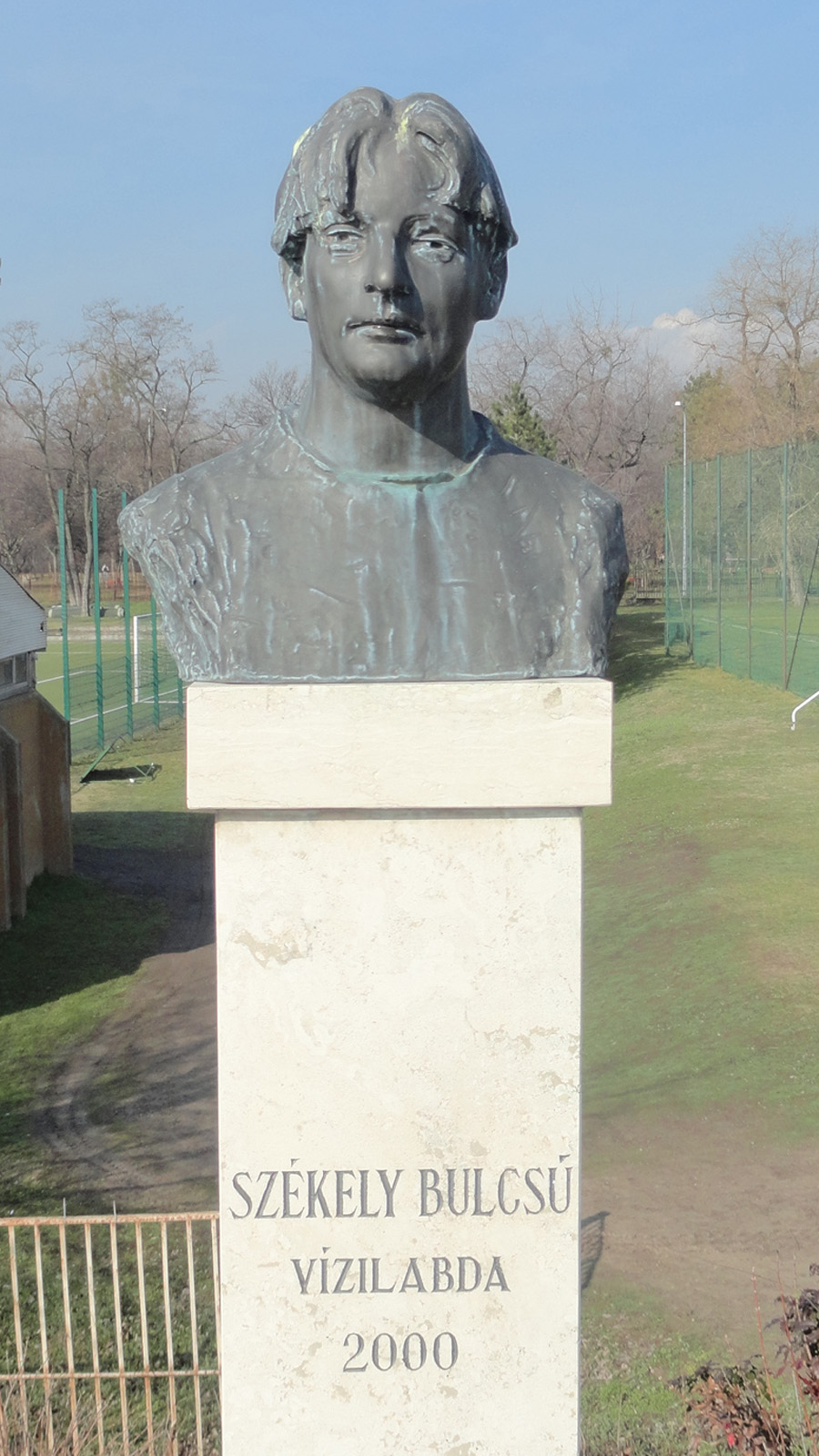

Personal information
- Nickname: Csucsu
- Born: 2 June 1976 (age 50) Budapest, Hungary
- Height: 1.80 m (5 ft 11 in)

Sport
- Sport: Water polo

Youth career
- Years: Team
- –: OSC
- –: KSI

Senior clubs
- Years: Team
- –1994: KSI
- 1994–1995: Tunsgram
- 1995–1996: Kordax BSC
- 1996–2001: FTC-Mirato
- 2001–2002: Vasas-Plaket
- 2002–2004: Jégcsillag-FTC
- 2004–2005: Panionios
- 2005–2006: UTE-VB Leasing
- 2006–2011: Groupama Honvéd
- 2011–2012: FTC-Fisher Klíma
National team
- Years: Team
- 1997–2002: Hungary

Teams coached
- 2010–2011: Hungary junior
- 2011: Hungary Universiade
- –: KSI SE (youth)
Medal record
Men's water polo
Representing Hungary
Olympic Games
Gold medal – first place	2000 Sydney	Team competition

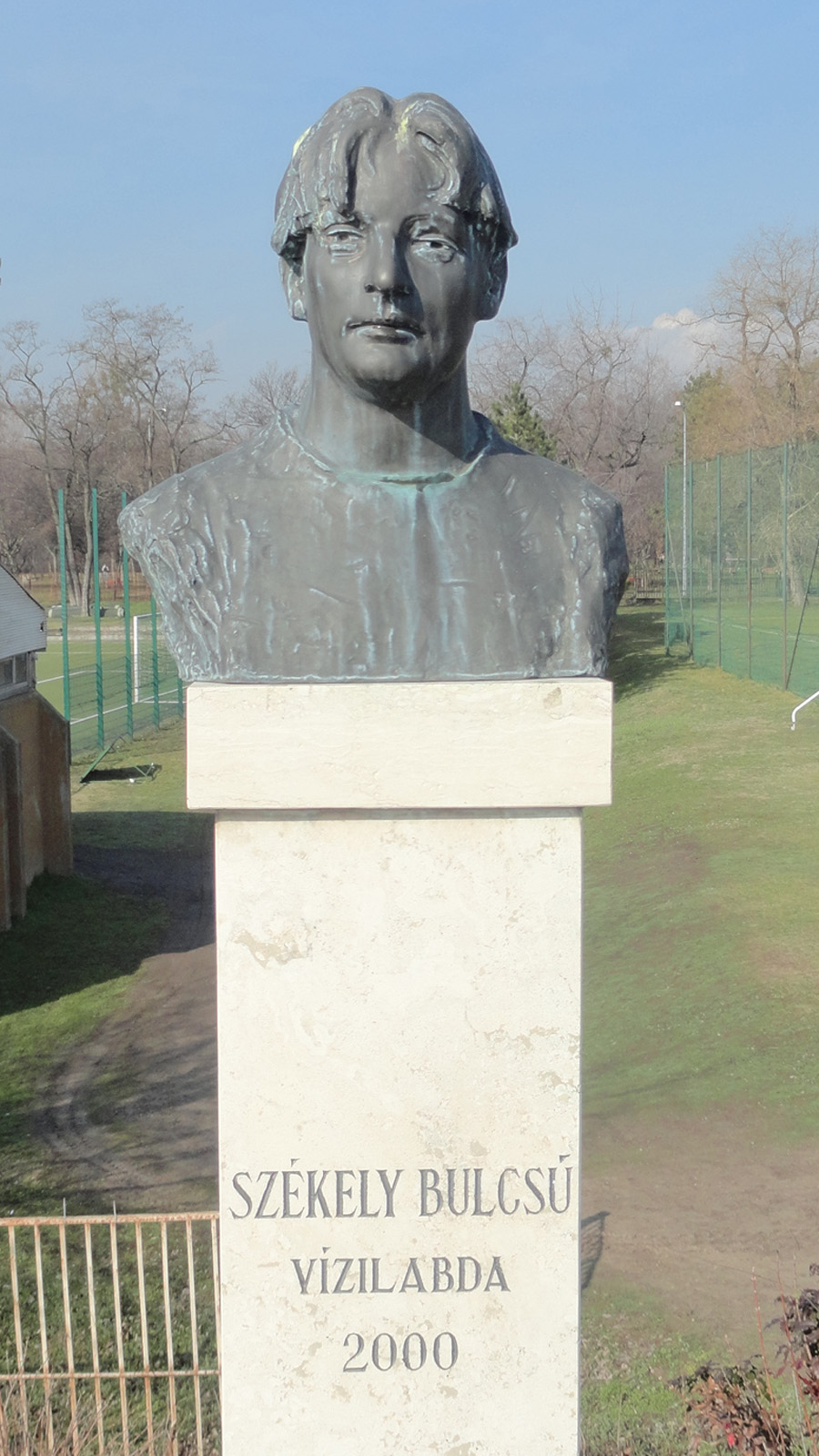
Bust of Bulcsú Székely

Bulcsú Székely (born 2 June 1976) is a Hungarian water polo player who played on the gold medal squad at the 2000 Summer Olympics.

== Honours ==
=== National ===
- Olympic Games: gold medal – 2000
- European Championship: gold medal – 1997, 1999; bronze medal – 2001
- FINA World League: bronze medal – 2002
- Universiade: (gold medal - 2003; bronze medal – 1999)
- Junior World Championships: (gold medal – 1995)
- Junior European Championship: (gold medal – 1994)

=== Club ===
European competitions:

- Cup Winners' Cup winners (2): (1998 – with FTC; 2002 – with Vasas)

Domestic competitions:

- Hungarian Championship (OB I): 1x (2000 – with FTC)
- Hungarian Cup (Magyar Kupa): 4x (1996 (2) – with FTC; 2002 - with Vasas; 2006, 2010 – with Bp. Honvéd)
- Hungarian SuperCup (Szuperkupa): 1x (2001 – with Vasas)

== Awards ==
- Masterly youth athlete: 1995
- Member of the Hungarian team of year: 1997, 1999, 2000
- Csanádi-díj: 2001

Orders

- Officer's Cross of the Order of Merit of the Republic of Hungary (2000)

== See also ==
- Hungary men's Olympic water polo team records and statistics
- List of Olympic champions in men's water polo
- List of Olympic medalists in water polo (men)
