= Balázs Hárai =

Hungarian water polo player

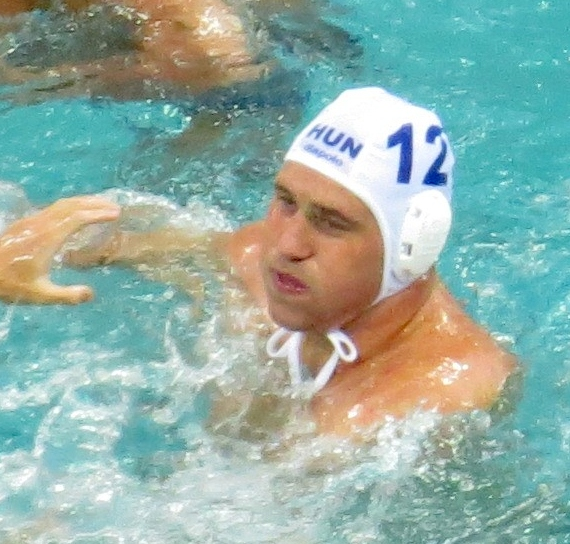
- Hárai at the 2016 Summer Olympics

Personal information
- Nickname: Pufi
- Nationality: Hungarian
- Born: 5 April 1987 (age 39) Budapest, Hungary
- Height: 202 cm (80 in)
- Weight: 110 kg (243 lb)

Sport
- Sport: Water polo
- Handedness: Right
- Position: Centre Forward
- Current club: Kaposvár

Youth career
- Years: Team
- –: BVSC

Senior clubs
- Years: Team
- –2006: KSI
- 2004–2008: Bp. Honvéd
- 2008–2010: Eger
- 2010–2012: Bp. Honvéd
- 2012–2013: Vasas
- 2013–2018: Eger
- 2018–2024: OSC-Újbuda
- 2024-: Kaposvár
National team
- Years: Team
- 2012–: Hungary
Medal record
Men's water polo
Representing Hungary
Olympic Games
Bronze medal – third place	2020 Tokyo	Team
World Championships
Gold medal – first place	2013 Barcelona	Team
Silver medal – second place	2017 Budapest	Team
European Championships
Gold medal – first place	2020 Budapest
Silver medal – second place	2014 Budapest
Bronze medal – third place	2012 Eindhoven
Bronze medal – third place	2016 Belgrade
FINA World Cup
Silver medal – second place	2014 Almaty
- Updated on 2 August 2023

Balázs Hárai (born 5 April 1987) is a Hungarian water polo center forward. He competed at the 2012 and 2016 Olympics and won a gold medal at the 2013 World Championships.

== Honours ==
=== National ===
- Olympic Games: Bronze medal - 2020
- World Championships: Gold medal - 2013; Silver medal - 2017
- European Championship: Gold medal - 2020; Silver medal - 2014; Bronze medal - 2012, 2016
- FINA World League: Silver medal - 2013, 2014
- FINA World Cup: Silver medal - 2014
- Junior World Championships: (gold medal - 2007)

=== Club ===
- Hungarian Championship (OB I): 2x (2005, 2006 - with Bp. Honvéd)
- Hungarian Cup (Magyar Kupa): 4x (2006, 2010 - with Bp. Honvéd; 2008, 2009 - with Eger)

== Awards ==
- Szalay Iván Award (2005)
- Junior Príma Award (2011)
- Silver Cross of the Cross of Merit of Hungary (2012)
- Hungarian Water Polo Player of the Year: 2015, 2016

== See also ==
- List of world champions in men's water polo
- List of World Aquatics Championships medalists in water polo
