= Barnabás Steinmetz =

Hungarian water polo player

Personal information
- Nicknames: Börni, Séma, néger, Janikám
- Nationality: Hungarian
- Born: 6 October 1975 (age 51) Budapest, Hungary
- Height: 1.94 m (6 ft 4 1/2 in)

Sport
- Sport: Water polo
- Handedness: Right
- Position: Guard
- Current club: Austria (head coach); Bp. Honvéd (assistant)

Youth career
- Years: Team
- –: KSI

Senior clubs
- Years: Team
- –1993: KSI
- 1993–1995: FTC-Vitasport
- 1995–1996: Szeged
- 1996–2000: FTC-Thomas Jeans
- 2000–2003: Posillipo
- 2003–2009: TEVA-VasasPlaket
- 2009–2010: Ferencváros
- 2010–2012: TEVA-Vasas-UNIQA
- 2012–2017: RacioNet Honvéd
National team
- Years: Team
- 1993–2006: Hungary

Teams coached
- 2015–: Austria
- 2015–: Austria junior (youth)
- 2017–: Bp. Honvéd (assistant)
Medal record
Men's water polo
Representing Hungary
Olympic Games
Gold medal – first place	2000 Sydney	Team competition
Gold medal – first place	2004 Athens	Team competition
World Championships
Gold medal – first place	2003 Barcelona	Team competition
FINA World Cup
Gold medal – first place	1999 Sydney	Team competition
Silver medal – second place	2002 Belgrade	Team competition

Barnabás Steinmetz (born 6 October 1975 in Budapest) is a Hungarian water polo player who played on the gold medal squads at the 2000 Summer Olympics and 2004 Summer Olympics. He is nicknamed Barney and Sema, and made his debut for the national team in 1993, at an international tournament in Moscow, Russia. He is currently the player of Vasas SC.

== Honours ==
=== National ===
- Olympic Games: Gold medal - 2000, 2004
- World Championships: Gold medal - 2003; Silver medal - 1998
- European Championship: Gold medal - 1997, 1999; Silver medal - 1993; bronze medal - 2001, 2003
- Universiade: (silver medal - 1995)
- Junior World Championships: (gold medal - 1995; bronze medal - 1993)
- Junior European Championship: (gold medal - 1992, 1994)

=== Club ===
- Cup Winners' Cup Winners (2): (1998 - with FTC; 2003 - with Posillipo)
- Hungarian Championship (OB I): 5x (2000 - with FTC; 2007, 2008, 2009, 2012 - with Vasas)
- Hungarian Cup (Magyar Kupa): 3x (1996 (2) - with FTC; 2004, 2005 - with Vasas)
- Italian Championship (Serie A1): 1x (2001 - with Posillipo)

== Awards ==
- Member of the Hungarian team of year: 1993, 1997, 1999, 2000, 2003, 2004
- Masterly youth athlete: 1995, 1996
- Papp László Budapest Sportíj (2014)

Orders

- Officer's Cross of the Order of Merit of the Republic of Hungary (2000)
- Commander's Cross of the Order of Merit of the Republic of Hungary (2004)

== See also ==
- Hungary men's Olympic water polo team records and statistics
- List of Olympic champions in men's water polo
- List of Olympic medalists in water polo (men)
- List of world champions in men's water polo
- List of World Aquatics Championships medalists in water polo
