= Attila Vári =

Hungarian water polo player

Personal information
- Nickname: Doki
- Nationality: Hungarian
- Born: 26 February 1976 (age 50) Budapest, Hungary
- Height: 2.01 m (6 ft 7 in)

Sport
- Sport: Water polo
- Handedness: Right
- Position: Centre back

Youth career
- Years: Team
- 1987–: KSI

Senior clubs
- Years: Team
- –1994: KSI
- 1994–2002: Vasas-Plaket
- 2002–2009: Domino-Honvéd
- 2009–2011: PVSK-Füszért
National team
- Years: Team
- 1995–2006: Hungary
Medal record
Men's water polo
Representing Hungary
Olympic Games
Gold medal – first place	2000 Sydney	Team competition
Gold medal – first place	2004 Athens	Team competition
World Championships
Gold medal – first place	2003 Barcelona	Team competition
Silver medal – second place	2005 Montréal	Team competition
FINA World Cup
Gold medal – first place	1999 Sydney	Team competition
Silver medal – second place	2002 Belgrade	Team competition

Attila Vári (born 26 February 1976 in Budapest), nicknamed Doki, is a Hungarian water polo player, who played on the gold medal squads at the 2000 Summer Olympics and 2004 Summer Olympics.

Vári began his athletic career with modern pentathlon but later switched to water polo. He made his debut for the Hungarian national team in 1997.

Vári was elected into the presidium of the Hungarian Olympic Committee (MOB) in May 2017. He was elected President of the Hungarian Water Polo Federation (MVLSZ) in September 2018, replacing Dénes Kemény. The ruling party Fidesz–KDNP nominated Vári as their candidate for the position of Mayor of Pécs in the 2019 Hungarian local elections, but was defeated by the opposition's joint candidate Attila Péterffy.

== Honours ==
=== National ===
- Olympic Games: gold medal – 2000, 2004
- World Championships: gold medal – 2003; silver medal – 1998, 2005
- European Championship: gold medal – 1997, 1999; bronze medal – 2001, 2003
- FINA World League: gold medal – 2003, 2004; silver medal – 2005; bronze medal – 2002
- FINA World Cup: gold medal – 1999; silver medal – 2002; bronze medal – 1997
- Universiade: (silver medal – 1995)
- Junior World Championships: (gold medal – 1995)
- Junior European Championship: (gold medal – 1994)

=== Club ===
- Euroleague Winners (1): (2004 – with Bp. Honvéd)
- Cup Winners' Cup Winners (2): (1995, 2002 – with Vasas)
- LEN Super Cup Winner (1): (2004 – with Bp. Honvéd)
- Hungarian Championship (OB I): 4x (2003, 2004, 2005, 2006 – with Bp. Honvéd)
- Hungarian Cup (Magyar Kupa): 4x (1996 (1), 1997, 2001, 2002 – with Vasas)
- Hungarian SuperCup (Szuperkupa): 1x (2001 – with Vasas)

== Awards ==
- Masterly youth athlete: 1995
- Member of the Hungarian team of year: 1997, 1999, 2000, 2003, 2004
- Hungarian Water Polo Player of the Year: 2000
- Csanádi-díj: 2001

Orders

- Officer's Cross of the Order of Merit of the Republic of Hungary (2000)
- Commander's Cross of the Order of Merit of the Republic of Hungary (2004)

== See also ==
- Hungary men's Olympic water polo team records and statistics
- List of Olympic champions in men's water polo
- List of Olympic medalists in water polo (men)
- List of world champions in men's water polo
- List of World Aquatics Championships medalists in water polo
