= Imre Tóth (water polo) =

Hungarian water polo player

Personal information
- Nationality: Hungarian
- Born: 3 November 1963 (age 62) Budapest, Hungary

Sport
- Sport: Water polo
Medal record
Representing Hungary
World Championships
Bronze medal – third place	1991 Perth	Team competition
European Championships
Silver medal – second place	1983 Rome	Team competition

Imre Tóth (born 3 November 1963) is a Hungarian water polo player. He competed at the 1988 Summer Olympics and the 1992 Summer Olympics.

== See also ==
- List of World Aquatics Championships medalists in water polo
