= 2003–04 Országos Bajnokság I (men's water polo) =

Water polo league season

OB I
- Season: 2003–04
- Champions: Honvéd
- Euroleague: Honvéd; Vasas; Ferencváros

2003–04 Országos Bajnokság I (men's water polo) was the 98th water polo championship in Hungary.

== First stage ==
#	Team	M	W	D	L	G+	G−	P
1.	Vasas SC-Plaket-Euroleasing	22	22	0	0	285	97	44
2.	Domino-Bp. Honvéd	22	20	0	2	300	119	40
3.	BVSC-Brendon	22	17	0	5	214	112	34
4.	Jégcsillag-Ferencvárosi TC	22	15	1	6	224	138	31
5.	Újpesti TE-Taxi2000	22	12	4	6	198	169	28
6.	Szeged-Beton VE	22	11	1	10	147	198	23
7.	ZF Hungária-Egri VK	22	7	4	11	135	182	18
8.	OSC-British Knights	22	6	4	12	153	208	16
9.	Legrand-Szentesi VK	22	4	2	16	145	221	10
10.	Szent István Egyetem	22	3	2	17	128	260	8
11.	Szolnoki VSC	22	3	2	17	142	239	8
12.	Ceglédi VSE-Geosaurus	22	1	2	19	112	240	4

Championship Playoff
European competition Playoff
Relegation Playoff

Pld - Played; W - Won; L - Lost; PF - Points for; PA - Points against; Diff - Difference; Pts - Points.

== Championship Playoff ==
Semifinals
1	Vasas SC-Plaket-Euroleasing	9	11
4	Jégcsillag-Ferencvárosi TC	7	3
2	Domino-Bp. Honvéd	10	6
3	BVSC-Brendon	5	5

Final
1	Vasas SC-Plaket-Euroleasing	7	12	5	8
2	Domino-Bp. Honvéd	8	8	6	9
Third place
4	Jégcsillag-Ferencvárosi TC	5	6
3	BVSC-Brendon	6	8

OB I 2003–04
Champions

Honvéd
4th Title

== European competition Playoff ==
Placement Semifinals
5	Újpesti TE-Taxi2000	13	10
8	OSC-British Knights	8	9
6	Szeged-Beton VE	11	7	7
7	ZF Hungária-Egri VK	8	8	5

Fifth place
5	Újpesti TE-Taxi2000	12	7	9
6	Szeged-Beton VE	11	8	4
Seventh place
8	OSC-British Knights	6	5	4
7	ZF Hungária-Egri VK	5	7	7

== Relegation Playoff ==
Placement Semifinals
9	Legrand-Szentesi VK	11	10
12	Ceglédi VSE-Geosaurus	4	7
10	Szent István University	4	4
11	Szolnoki VSC	11	11

Ninth place
9	Legrand-Szentesi VK	14	8	9
11	Szolnoki VSC	11	11	6
Relegation play-offs
12	Ceglédi VSE-Geosaurus	10	12	6
10	Szent István University	11	10	7

== Sources ==
- Magyar sportévkönyv 2005
