= Hungarian University of Agriculture and Life Sciences =

University in Gödöllő, Hungary

Coordinates: 47.5938°N 19.3612°E

- Type: Public university Polytechnic university
- Established: 1787; 239 years ago
- Affiliations: IAU, EUA, EQUIS, ERASMUS
- Rector: Dr. Csaba Gyuricza
- Academic staff: 1,313
- Students: 12,444
- Location: Budapest, Gödöllő, Hungary
- Campus: urban
- Website: http://sziu.hu/

University rankings

Regional – Overall
- QS Emerging Europe and Central Asia: 110 (2022)

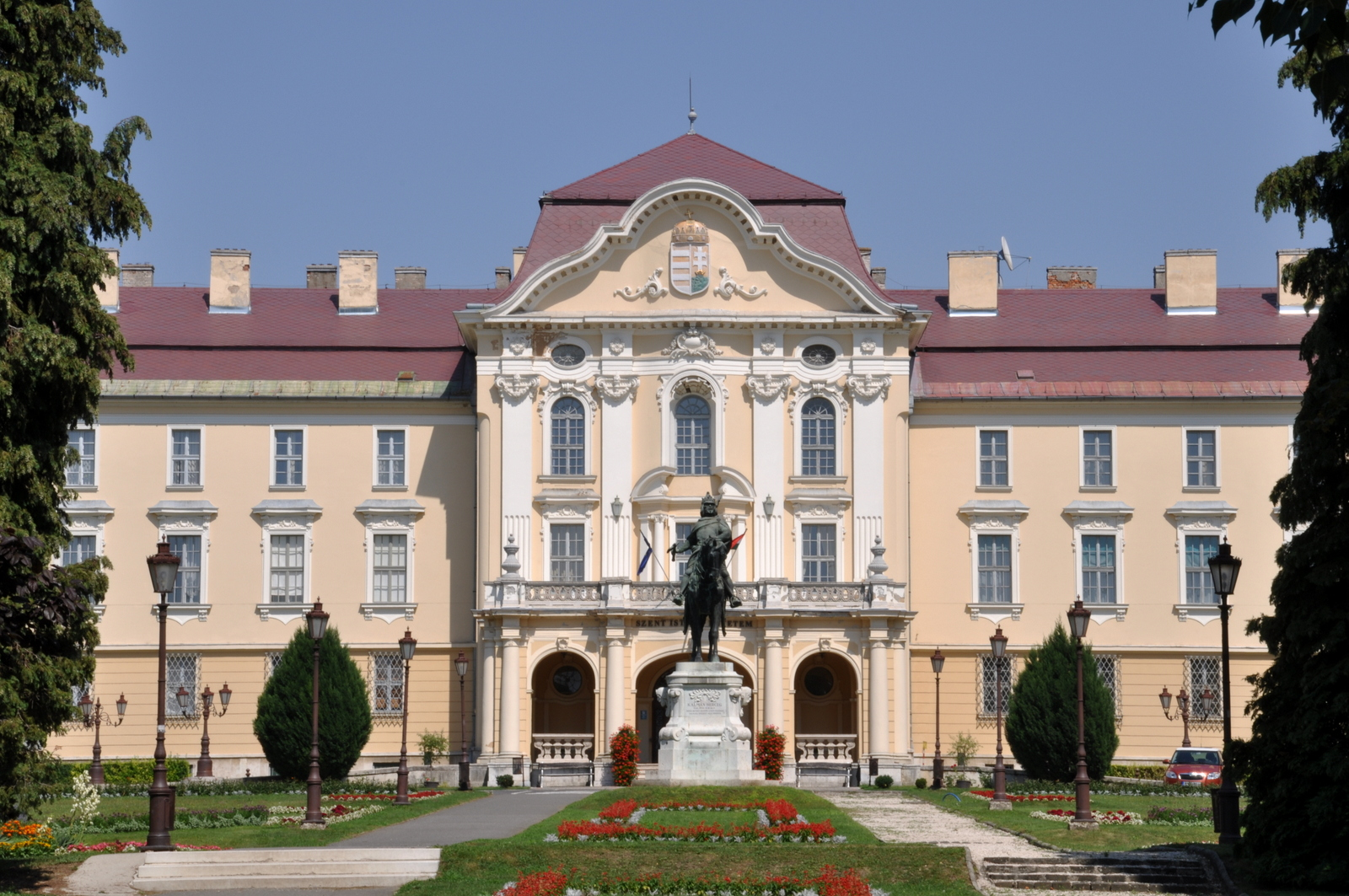
The facade of the main campus of the Hungarian University of Agriculture and Life Sciences in Gödöllő.

The Hungarian University of Agriculture and Life Sciences is a university of technology in Hungary. Its headquarters and main campus are located about 30 kilometres from the capital, Budapest, in the Central Hungarian town of Gödöllő. Other campuses are based in Budapest, Békéscsaba, Gyula, Jászberény and Szarvas.

The university was established in 2000 from the merge of several previously independent institutions—the oldest of these being the former University of Veterinary Medicine Budapest, founded in 1787. (Note: In 2016, the University of Veterinary Medicine Budapest regained its independence thus it is no longer part of the SZIU.) The Szent István University is named after Hungarian King Stephen I (the Saint). The current rector of the university is Dr. János Tőzsér.

== Change of structure ==
On 1 February 2021 the university structure changed. The new name

- Hungarian University of Agriculture and Life Sciences

There are now no faculties.

The structure consists of

- Campuses

Budai Campus (Budapest);
Georgikon (Keszthely);
Szent István (Gödöllő);
Károly Róbert (Gyöngyös);
Kaposvár

- Institutes

=== Faculties before 2021 ===
- Faculty of Agricultural and Environmental Sciences
- Faculty of Agricultural and Economics Studies
- Faculty of Economics and Social Sciences
- Faculty of Food Science
- Faculty of Horticultural Science
- Faculty of Landscape Architecture and Urbanism
- Faculty of Mechanical Engineering
- Ybl Miklós Faculty of Architecture and Civil Engineering
