= Rajmund Fodor =

Hungarian water polo player

Personal information
- Nationality: Hungarian
- Born: 21 February 1976 (age 50) Szeged, Hungary

Sport
- Sport: Water polo
- Handedness: Right
- Current club: Kaposvár (tech. director)

Youth career
- Years: Team
- 1986–: Szeged

Senior clubs
- Years: Team
- –1996: Szeged
- 1996–1997: FTC-Vitalin
- 1997–1998: Florentia
- 1998–1999: FTC-Vitalin
- 1999–2002: Florentia
- 2002–2008: Domino-Honvéd
- 2008–2009: Nervi
- 2008–2011: → Sliema (Summer League)
- 2009–2010: Bogliasco
- 2010–2012: Al-Ittihad
- 2012–2014: UVSE-Hunguest Hotels
National team
- Years: Team
- 1993–2007: Hungary

Teams coached
- 2014–2019: Vasas (youth)
- 2020–: Kaposvár (tech. director)
Medal record
Men's water polo
Representing Hungary
Olympic Games
Gold medal – first place	2000 Sydney	Team competition
Gold medal – first place	2004 Athens	Team competition
World Championships
Gold medal – first place	2003 Barcelona	Team competition
Silver medal – second place	2005 Montréal	Team competition
Silver medal – second place	2007 Melbourne	Team competition
FINA World Cup
Gold medal – first place	1999 Sydney	Team competition
Silver medal – second place	2002 Belgrade	Team competition
Silver medal – second place	2006 Budapest	Team competition
FINA World League
Silver medal – second place	2007 Berlin	Team competition

Rajmund Fodor (born 21 February 1976 in Szeged) is a Hungarian water polo player, who played on the gold medal squads at the 2000 Summer Olympics and 2004 Summer Olympics. He is nicknamed Rajmi, and made his debut for the national team in 1993. He studied at Radnóti Miklós High School in Szeged.

He is married and he has a daughter: Nadine (born 2 September 2005).

== Honours ==
=== National ===
- Olympic Games: Gold medal - 2000, 2004
- World Championships: Gold medal - 2003; Silver medal - 1998, 2005, 2007
- European Championship: Gold medal - 1997, 1999; Silver medal - 1993, 1995, 2006; Bronze medal - 2001, 2003
- FINA World League: Gold medal - 2003, 2004; Silver medal - 2007; Bronze medal - 2002
- FINA World Cup: Gold medal - 1995, 1999; Silver medal - 1993, 2002, 2006; Bronze medal - 1997
- Junior World Championships: (Gold medal - 1995; Bronze medal - 1991, 1993)
- Junior European Championship: (Gold medal - 1992, 1994)

=== Club ===
- Cup Winners' Cup Winners (1): (2001 - with Florentia)
- Hungarian Championship (OB I): 4x (2003, 2004, 2005, 2006 - with Bp. Honvéd)
- Hungarian Cup (Magyar Kupa): 2x (1996 (2) - with FTC; 2006 - with Bp. Honvéd)
- Saudi-Arabian Championship: 1x (2011 - with Al-Ittihad)

== Awards ==
- Masterly youth athlete: 1993, 1994, 1995
- Member of the Hungarian team of year: 1993, 1997, 1999, 2000, 2003, 2004

Orders

- Officer's Cross of the Order of Merit of the Republic of Hungary (2000)
- Commander's Cross of the Order of Merit of the Republic of Hungary (2004)

== See also ==
- Hungary men's Olympic water polo team records and statistics
- List of Olympic champions in men's water polo
- List of Olympic medalists in water polo (men)
- List of world champions in men's water polo
- List of World Aquatics Championships medalists in water polo
