= Water polo at the 2003 Summer Universiade =

Water polo at the XXII Summer Universiade

Medalists
1st place, gold medalist(s)		Hungary
2nd place, silver medalist(s)		Serbia and Montenegro
3rd place, bronze medalist(s)		Australia

Water polo events were contested at the 2003 Summer Universiade in Daegu, South Korea.

Event	Gold	Silver	Bronze
Men's	Hungary (HUN)	Serbia and Montenegro (SCG)	Australia (AUS)
