= 2004–05 Országos Bajnokság I (men's water polo) =

Polo championship

OB I
- Season: 2004–2005
- Champions: Honvéd
- Euroleague: Honvéd; Vasas; Szeged
- LEN Cup: Eger; Ferencváros

2004–05 Országos Bajnokság I (men's water polo) was the 99th water polo championship in Hungary.

== First stage ==
| # | Team | M | W | D | L | G+ | G− | P |
|---|---|---|---|---|---|---|---|---|
| 1. | Domino-Bp. Honvéd | 22 | 21 | 0 | 1 | 306 | 110 | 42 |
| 2. | TEVA-Vasas SC-Plaket | 22 | 19 | 0 | 3 | 234 | 120 | 38 |
| 3. | Brendon-ZF-Egri VK | 22 | 19 | 0 | 3 | 236 | 119 | 38 |
| 4. | Szeged-Beton VE | 22 | 14 | 1 | 7 | 173 | 139 | 29 |
| 5. | Betonút-Ferencvárosi TC | 22 | 14 | 0 | 8 | 195 | 123 | 28 |
| 6. | Újpesti TE-VB Leasing | 22 | 13 | 0 | 9 | 188 | 181 | 26 |
| 7. | Legrand-Szentesi VK | 22 | 8 | 1 | 13 | 166 | 205 | 17 |
| 8. | BVSC-Turbo | 22 | 7 | 1 | 14 | 169 | 196 | 15 |
| 9. | OSC-British Knights | 22 | 6 | 2 | 14 | 139 | 227 | 14 |
| 10. | Szolnoki VSC | 22 | 5 | 3 | 14 | 140 | 206 | 13 |
| 11. | Neptun VSC | 22 | 2 | 0 | 20 | 107 | 260 | 4 |
| 12. | Szent István Egyetem | 22 | 0 | 0 | 22 | 93 | 260 | 0 |

| Championship Playoff |
| European competition Playoff |
| Relegation Playoff |

Pld - Played; W - Won; L - Lost; PF - Points for; PA - Points against; Diff - Difference; Pts - Points.

== Championship Playoff ==
Semifinals
1 | Domino-Bp. Honvéd | 6 | 10
4 | Szeged-Beton VE | 3 | 5
2 | TEVA-Vasas SC-Plaket | 9 | 6 | 8 | 7 | 9
3 | Brendon-ZF-Egri VK | 6 | 9 | 3 | 8 | 7

Final
1 | Domino-Bp. Honvéd | 12 | 6 | 11
2 | TEVA-Vasas SC-Plaket | 5 | 5 | 4
Third place
4 | Szeged-Beton VE | 8 | 10 | - | - | -
3 | Brendon-ZF-Egri VK | 12 | 5 | - | - | -

OB I 2004–05
Champions

Honvéd
5th Title

== European competition Playoff ==
Placement Semifinals
5 | Betonút-Ferencvárosi TC | 6 | 7
8 | BVSC-Turbo | 4 | 4
6 | Újpesti TE-VB Leasing | 14 | 4 | 8
7 | Legrand-Szentesi VK | 13 | 5 | 7

Fifth place
5 | Betonút-Ferencvárosi TC | 10 | 9
6 | Újpesti TE-VB Leasing | 5 | 8
Seventh place
8 | BVSC-Turbo | 4 | 8
7 | Legrand-Szentesi VK | 11 | 9

== Relegation Playoff ==
Placement Semifinals
9 | OSC-British Knights | 12 | 6
12 | Szent István University | 11 | 5
10 | Szolnoki VSC | 15 | 8
11 | Neptun VSC | 7 | 5

Ninth place
9 | OSC-British Knights | 4 | 8
10 | Szolnoki VSC | 5 | 11
Relegation play-offs
12 | Szent István University | 1 | 5
11 | Neptun VSC | 8 | 8

== Sources ==
- Magyar sportévkönyv 2006
