= Budapesti Honvéd SE (men's water polo) =

Hungarian water polo team

- Full name: Budapesti Honvéd Sportegyesület
- Short name: BHSE
- Founded: 1949; 77 years ago
- League: Országos Bajnokság I
- Based in: Budapest, Hungary
- Arena: Kőér utcai sportuszoda (Capacity: 700)
- Colors: Red and white
- President: Lajos Fodor
- Head coach: Márton Szívós
- Championships: 1 Champions League; 1 LEN Super Cup; 6 Hungarian Championships; 8 Hungarian Cups; 1 Hungarian Super Cup
- 2021–22: Országos Bajnokság I, 5th of 14
- Website: honved-vizilabda.hu

Budapesti Honvéd Sport Egyesület is a Hungarian water polo club that is part of the Budapest-based multi-sports club with the same name. Founded in 1950, they won six Hungarian championships and eight Hungarian cup titles.

In 2004, beside the domestic league success the team also collected the most prestigious continental cup, the LEN Euroleague, and later triumphed over LEN Cup winners CN Barcelona with a scoreline of 10–9 to win the LEN European Supercup.

Since 1 July 2010 the club is officially known as Groupama Honvéd, following the club has agreed on a sponsorship deal with international insurance company Groupama.

== Naming history ==
- Budapesti Honvéd Sport Egyesület (BHSE): (1949 – 1990)
- In 1990 the water polo section was defunct.
- Honvéd-Spartacus VE: (1998/99) - Merged with Budapesti Spartacus SC
- Bp. Honvéd-Domino: (1999/00 – 2000/01) - the first naming sponsor
- Domino-BHSE: (2001/02 – 2006/07)
- Domino Honvéd: (2007/08 – 2009/10)
- Groupama Honvéd: (2010/11 – 2012/13)
- RacioNet Honvéd: (2013/14 – 2017/18)
- Budapesti Honvéd SE: (2018/19 – ... )

== Honours ==
=== Domestic competitions ===
- Országos Bajnokság I (National Championship of Hungary)

Champions (6): 2000–01, 2001–02, 2002–03, 2003–04, 2004–05, 2005–06
Runners-up (2): 1967, 2006–07
Third place (11): 1950, 1954, 1955, 1959, 1965, 1968, 1982, 1998–99*, 1999–00, 2007–08, 2008–09

- Magyar Kupa (National Cup of Hungary)

Winners (8): 1953, 1954, 1958, 1959, 1979, 1998–99, 2006, 2010
Finalist (8): 1955, 1957, 1960, 1961, 1964, 1965, 1966, 2011

- Szuperkupa (Super Cup of Hungary); Championship vs. Cup winner

Winners (): 2005

=== European competitions ===
- LEN Champions League (Euroleague)

Winners (1): 2003–04

- LEN Euro Cup

Semi-finalist (1): 2010–11

- LEN Cup Winners' Cup

Runners-up (1): 1980–81

- LEN Super Cup

Winners (1): 2004

== Current squad ==
Season 2020–2021

№	Nat.	Player	Birth Date	Position	L/R
1	(Hungary)	Attila Decker	August 25, 1987 (age 39)	Goalkeeper	
2	(Hungary)	Bálint Kiss	April 12, 1996 (age 30)		
3	(Hungary)	Tamás Gyárfás	August 24, 1994 (age 32)		
4	(Hungary)	Tibor Fazekas	July 22, 1992 (age 34)	Wing	R
5	(Hungary)	Bendegúz Tóth	February 6, 1993 (age 33)		
6	(Hungary)	Róbert Fejős	March 22, 1994 (age 32)		
9	(Hungary)	Roland Zsolt Simon	September 1, 1992 (age 34)		
10	(Hungary)	Balázs Kalanovics	June 1, 1995 (age 31)		
11	(Hungary)	Pál Irmes	January 1, 1997 (age 29)		
12	(Hungary)	Adrián Simon	August 24, 1986 (age 40)		
14	(Croatia)	Borna Duvnjak-Starčević	January 21, 1996 (age 30)	Goalkeeper	
	(Hungary)	Norbert Hosnyánszky	March 4, 1984 (age 42)	Centre Back	R

=== Technical staff ===
- (Hungary) Technical Director: István Vincze
- (Hungary) Head Coach: Márton Szívós
- (Hungary) Youth Coach: Imre Tóth
- (Hungary) Team Doctor: Antal Gábor, MD
- (Hungary) Physiotherapist: Tamás Klenyán

== Recent seasons ==
As of 14 December 2024.

League		Domestic cup	European competitions	
Season	Pos.	Domestic cup	European competitions	
1998–99	Third place	Champions		
1999–00	Third place	Quarter-finalist	2 Cup Winners' Cup	Semi-finalist
2000–01	Champions	Quarter-finalist		
2001–02	Champions	Semi-finalist	1 Champions League	Runners-up
2002–03	Champions	Semi-finalist	1 Champions League	Runners-up
2003–04	Champions	did not held	1 Euroleague	Champions
2004–05	Champions		LEN Super Cup	Champions
2004–05	Champions		1 Euroleague	Runners-up
2005–06	Champions		1 Euroleague	Quarter-finalist
2006–07	Runners-up	Champions	1 Euroleague	Quarter-finalist
2007–08	Third place	Finalist	1 Euroleague	Preliminary round
2008–09	Third place		1 Euroleague	Qualifying round
2008–09	Third place		2 LEN Cup	Quarterfinalist
2009–10	5th place	Semi-finalist	1 Euroleague	Preliminary round
2010–11	4th place	Champion	2 LEN Cup	Semi-finalist
2011–12	4th place	Finalist	2 Euro Cup	Round of 16
2012–13	6th place	Quarter-finalist		
2013–14	4th place	Quarter-finalist		
2014–15	6th place	Semi-finalist		
2015–16	8th place	Quarter-finalist		
2016–17	9th place	Semi-finalist		
2017–18	7th place	Quarter-finalist		
2018–19	7th place	Quarter-finalist		
2019–20	6th place^{1}	Quarter-finalist		
2020–21	6th place	Preliminary round		
2021–22	5th place	Round of 16		
2022–23	Third place	Semi-finalist	2 Euro Cup	Quarter-finalist
2023–24	5th place	Semi-finalist	1 Champions League	Qualifying round
2023–24	5th place	Semi-finalist	2 Euro Cup	Group stage
2024–25		3-4th place	2 Euro Cup	Group stage

^1 Cancelled due to the COVID-19 pandemic in Hungary.

=== In European competition ===
- Participations in Champions League (Champions Cup, Euroleague): 9x
- Participations in Euro Cup (LEN Cup): 5x
- Participations in Cup Winners' Cup: 2x

Season	Competition	Round	Club	Home	Away	Aggregate
1980–81	Cup Winners' Cup; Finalist	Finals	(Soviet Union) CSKA Moscow			
1999–2000	Cup Winners' Cup	Quarter-finals	(Croatia) Bellevue Dubrovnik	6-4	6-6	12–10
1999–2000	Cup Winners' Cup	Semi-finals	(Italy) Florentia			
2001–02	Champions League; Finalist	Preliminary round Red Group	(Federal Republic of Yugoslavia) Bečej	12-7	11-8	2nd place
2001–02	Champions League; Finalist	Preliminary round Red Group	(Russia) Dynamo Moscow	13-4	9-10	2nd place
2001–02	Champions League; Finalist	Preliminary round Red Group	(Croatia) Jug Dubrovnik	10-7	6-9	2nd place
2001–02	Champions League; Finalist	Semi-final (F4)	(Italy) Posillipo	9–8		
2001–02	Champions League; Finalist	Final (F4)	(Greece) Olympiacos	7–9		
2002–03	Champions League; Finalist	Preliminary round Red Group	(Croatia) HAVK Mladost	11-11	11-10	1st place
2002–03	Champions League; Finalist	Preliminary round Red Group	(Greece) Olympiacos	6-4	12-7	1st place
2002–03	Champions League; Finalist	Preliminary round Red Group	(France) Olympic Nice	8-5	10-7	1st place
2002–03	Champions League; Finalist	Semi-final (F4)	(Germany) Spandau 04	11–6		
2002–03	Champions League; Finalist	Final (F4)	(Italy) Pro Recco	4–9		
2003–04	Euroleague; Champion	Preliminary round (Group D)	(Serbia and Montenegro) Jadran Herceg Novi	6-6	5-6	2nd place
2003–04	Euroleague; Champion	Preliminary round (Group D)	(Croatia) Jug Dubrovnik	8-5	11-12	2nd place
2003–04	Euroleague; Champion	Preliminary round (Group D)	(Russia) Spartak Volgograd	13-11	4-4	2nd place
2003–04	Euroleague; Champion	Quarter-finals	(Hungary) Vasas	8-8	7-6	15–14
2003–04	Euroleague; Champion	Semi-final (F4)	(Croatia) Primorje Rijeka	7–6		
2003–04	Euroleague; Champion	Final (F4)	(Serbia and Montenegro) Jadran Herceg Novi	7–6		
2004–05	Euroleague; Finalist	Preliminary round (Group D)	(Greece) Olympiacos	11-4	7-4	2nd place
2004–05	Euroleague; Finalist	Preliminary round (Group D)	(Russia) Shturm Ruza	12-8	15-11	2nd place
2004–05	Euroleague; Finalist	Preliminary round (Group D)	(Italy) Leonessa	12-8	3-7	2nd place
2004–05	Euroleague; Finalist	Quarter-finals	(Russia) Spartak Volgograd	13-6	12-8	25–14
2004–05	Euroleague; Finalist	Semi-final (F4)	(Croatia) Jug Dubrovnik	10–9 (aet)		
2004–05	Euroleague; Finalist	Final (F4)	(Italy) Posillipo	8–9 (aet)		
2005–06	Euroleague	Preliminary round (Group A)	(Germany) Spandau 04	16-8	13-7	2nd place
2005–06	Euroleague	Preliminary round (Group A)	(Italy) Posillipo	14-9	8-9	2nd place
2005–06	Euroleague	Preliminary round (Group A)	(Croatia) HAVK Mladost	12-10	10-13	2nd place
2005–06	Euroleague	Quarter-finals	(Italy) Pro Recco	7-12	8-11	15–23
2006–07	Euroleague	Preliminary round (Group D)	(Spain) Barceloneta	12-8	13-14	1st place
2006–07	Euroleague	Preliminary round (Group D)	(Italy) Posillipo	15-7	13-10	1st place
2006–07	Euroleague	Preliminary round (Group D)	(Greece) Panionios	13-11	15-3	1st place
2006–07	Euroleague	Quarter-finals	(Greece) Olympiacos	9-11	9-11	18–22
2007–08	Euroleague	Preliminary round (Group C)	(Croatia) Jug Dubrovnik	11-10	5-10	3rd place
2007–08	Euroleague	Preliminary round (Group C)	(Hungary) Vasas	5-6	8-8	3rd place
2007–08	Euroleague	Preliminary round (Group C)	(Greece) Panionios	9-4	12-8	3rd place
2008–09	Euroleague	elimination in Second qualifying round				
2008-09	LEN Cup	Round of 16	(Greece) Vouliagmeni	12-3	12-8	24–11
2008-09	LEN Cup	Quarter-finals	(Russia) Sintez Kazan	7-7	8-9	15–16
2009–10	Euroleague	Preliminary round (Group C)	(Greece) Olympiacos	12-10	6-10	4th place
2009–10	Euroleague	Preliminary round (Group C)	(Serbia) Partizan	6-9	7-12	4th place
2009–10	Euroleague	Preliminary round (Group C)	(Montenegro) Budva	6-10	6-14	4th place
2010–11	LEN Cup	Round of 16	(Slovakia) Hornets Košice	14-8	2-5	16–13
2010–11	LEN Cup	Quarter-finals	(Romania) CSM Oradea	12-9	11-12	23–21
2010–11	LEN Cup	Semi-finals	(Greece) Panionios	12-9	6-11	18–20
2011–12	Euro Cup	Round of 16	(Italy) Savona	12-10	10-14	22–24
2022–23	Euro Cup	Round of 16	(Hungary) Szolnok	13-11	5-8	18–19
2023–24	Champions League	elimination in Qualification round				
2023–24	Euro Cup	Group stage (Group B)	(Hungary) Vasas	3-11	16-19*	3rd place
2023–24	Euro Cup	Group stage (Group B)	(Italy) Savona	5-6	7-14	3rd place
2023–24	Euro Cup	Group stage (Group B)	(Greece) Apollon Smyrnis	12-11	11-10	3rd place
2024–25	Euro Cup	Group stage (Group B)	(Serbia) Šabac	10-12	8-12	4th place
2024–25	Euro Cup	Group stage (Group B)	(Spain) Barcelona	13-12	9-10	4th place
2024–25	Euro Cup	Group stage (Group B)	(Greece) Panathinaikos	11-12	11-14	4th place

== Notable former players ==
=== Olympic champions ===
- Gergely Kiss – 13 years (2001-2008, 2012-____) 2000 Sydney, 2004 Athens, 2008 Beijing
- István Gergely – 12 years (2002-2014) 2004 Athens, 2008 Beijing
- István Hevesi – 8 years (1952-1960) 1956 Melbourne
- Tamás Molnár – 8 years (2001-2009) 2000 Sydney, 2004 Athens, 2008 Beijing
- Attila Vári – 7 years (2002-2009) 2000 Sydney, 2004 Athens
- Péter Biros – 6 years (2001-2007) 2000 Sydney, 2004 Athens, 2008 Beijing
- Rajmund Fodor – 6 years (2002-2008) 2000 Sydney, 2004 Athens
- János Konrád – 5 years (1964-1969) 1964 Tokyo
- Bulcsú Székely – 5 years (2006-2011) 2000 Sydney
- Antal Bolvári – 4 years (1952-1956) 1952 Helsinki, 1956 Melbourne
- György Gerendás – 4 years (1978-1982) 1976 Montreal
- Barnabás Steinmetz – 4 years (2012-2016) 2000 Sydney, 2004 Athens
- Tibor Benedek – 3 years (2004-2007) 2000 Sydney, 2004 Athens, 2008 Beijing
- Dezső Lemhényi – 2 years (1950-1951) 1952 Helsinki
- László Jeney – 2 years (1959–1960) 1952 Helsinki, 1956 Melbourne
- Attila Sudár – 1 year (1982) 1976 Montreal

== Former coaches ==
- (Hungary) Jenő Brandi (1950–1975)
- (Hungary) Kálmán Markovits (1976–1978)
- (Hungary) Antal Bolvári (1979–1988)
- (Hungary) István Kovács (1998–2008)
- (Hungary) Lajos Vad (2008– present)
