= KSI SE (men's water polo) =

Központi Sport- és Ifjúsági Egyesület
- Founded: 1963
- League: OB I
- Based in: Budapest, Hungary
- Arena: Széchy Tamás uszoda
- Colors
- President: Dr. István Szívós
- Head coach: János Horváth
- Website: ksipolo.hu

Központi Sport- és Ifjúsági SE is a water polo club from Budapest, Hungary. The team competes in the Országos Bajnokság I.

== Team ==
=== Current squad ===
Squad for the 2013–14 season

Νο.	Player	Position
1	(Hungary) Gergely Kardos	Goalkeeper
2	(Hungary) Bulcsú Székely	Guard
3	(Hungary) Dávid Szedmák	
4	(Hungary) Barnabás Albert	
5	(Hungary) Dr. György Hangody	
6	(Hungary) Róbert Fejős	
7	(Hungary) Hulmann Kristóf	
8	(Hungary) Norbert Kerschbaum	
9	(Hungary) Márk Marnitz	
10	(Hungary) Martin Márkus	
11	(Hungary) Edgár Haraszin	
12	(Hungary) Dr. László Hangody	
13	(Hungary) András Hangody	
14	(Hungary) István Kardos	Goalkeeper
Coach (Hungary) János Horváth

== Notable former players ==
- Attila Sudár
- György Kenéz
- Tibor Benedek
- Zsolt Varga
- Tamás Märcz
- Attila Vári
- Barnabás Steinmetz
- Tamás Kásás
- Ádám Steinmetz
