= 2018 Szuperkupa (men's water polo) =

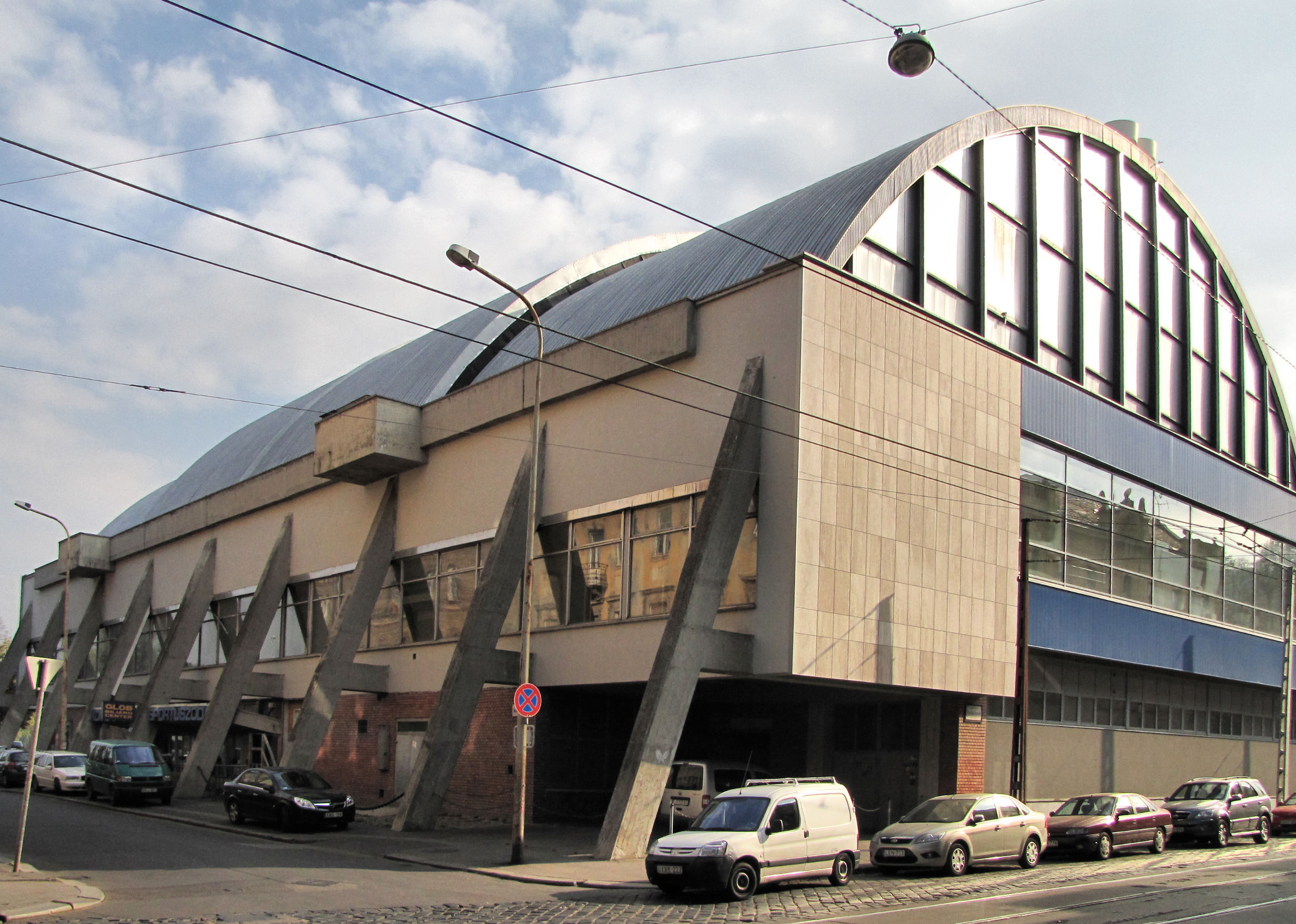
- The Császár-Komjádi Swimming Stadium in Budapest was held the match
Ferencváros	Szolnok
Országos Bajnokság I	Magyar Kupa
14	9
- Date: 22 December 2018
- Venue: Császár-Komjádi Swimming Stadium, Budapest

The 2018 Szuperkupa (known as the TippMix Férfi Szuperkupa for sponsorship reasons). It was played on 22 December 2018 in Budapest, Hungary. With Ferencvárosi TC winning both the 2017–18 Országos Bajnokság I championship and the 2017 Magyar Kupa cup winners Szolnoki Dózsa.

== Teams ==
Team	Qualification
Ferencváros	Winners of the 2017–18 Országos Bajnokság I
Szolnok	Winners of the 2017 Magyar Kupa

=== Squads ===
FTC-Telekom Waterpolo
№	Nat.	Player	Birth Date	Position	L/R
1	(Hungary)	András Gárdonyi	February 6, 1986	Goalkeeper	L
2	(Hungary)	Tamás Sedlmayer	January 6, 1995	Wing / centre back	R
3	(Hungary)	Márk Kállay	February 8, 1986	Left wing	R
4	(Hungary)	Zoltán Pohl	March 27, 1995	Guard	R
5	(Hungary)	Márton Vámos	June 24, 1992	Centre back / wing	L
6	(Hungary)	Tamás Mezei	September 14, 1990	Centre forward	L
7	(Hungary)	Toni Német	January 14, 1994	Centre forward	R
8	(Serbia)	Nikola Jakšić	January 17, 1997	Guard	R
9	(Australia) (Hungary)	Aaron Younger	September 25, 1991	Guard / centre back	R
10	(Hungary)	Dénes Varga (c)	March 29, 1987	Centre back	R
11	(Hungary)	Szilárd Jansik	April 6, 1994	Guard	R
12	(Serbia)	Stefan Mitrović	March 29, 1988	Centre back	R
13	(Hungary)	Miklós Gór-Nagy	January 8, 1983	Centre back / Guard	R
14	(Hungary)	Soma Vogel	July 7, 1997	Goalkeeper	R

Head coach: Zsolt Varga; Technical Director: György Gerendás

Szolnoki Dózsa
№	Nat.	Player	Birth Date	Position	L/R
1	(Hungary)	Viktor Nagy	July 24, 1984	Goalkeeper	R
2	(Hungary)	Dániel Angyal	March 22, 1992	Guard	R
3	(Hungary)	Bence Bátori	December 28, 1991	Wing	R
4	(Hungary)	Gergő Zalánki	February 26, 1995	Centre back	L
5	(Hungary)	Kristóf Szatmári	January 6, 1997		R
6	(Hungary)	Zsombor Szeghalmi	September 4, 2002	Centre back	L
7	(Serbia) (Hungary)	Milan Aleksić	May 13, 1986	Guard	L
8	(Serbia)	Viktor Rašović	August 13, 1993	Guard	R
9	(Serbia)	Andrija Prlainović	April 28, 1988	Centre back / wing	R
10	(Serbia)	Đorđe Lazić	May 19, 1996		R
11	(Hungary)	Gábor Kis (c)	September 27, 1982	Centre forward	R
12	(Hungary)	András Teleki	July 15, 1998		R
13	(Hungary)	Dávid Jansik	February 28, 1991	Guard	R
14	(Hungary)	Gergely Kardos	September 1, 1995	Goalkeeper	R

Head coach: Živko Gocić; Technical Director: István Kovács

== Match ==
22 December 2018; 20:30 (CET)	Report	FTC-Telekom	14–9	Szolnoki Dózsa	Komjádi Béla Sportuszoda, Budapest; Attendance: 1,200; Referees: Kun, Petik
22 December 2018; 20:30 (CET)	Report	Score by quarters: 4–2, 5–4, 2–1, 3–2			Komjádi Béla Sportuszoda, Budapest; Attendance: 1,200; Referees: Kun, Petik
22 December 2018; 20:30 (CET)	Report	Dé. Varga 4	Goals	Prlainović 3	Komjádi Béla Sportuszoda, Budapest; Attendance: 1,200; Referees: Kun, Petik

== See also ==
- 2018–19 Országos Bajnokság I (National Championship of Hungary)
- 2018 Magyar Kupa (National Cup of Hungary)
