= 2017 Szuperkupa (men's water polo) =

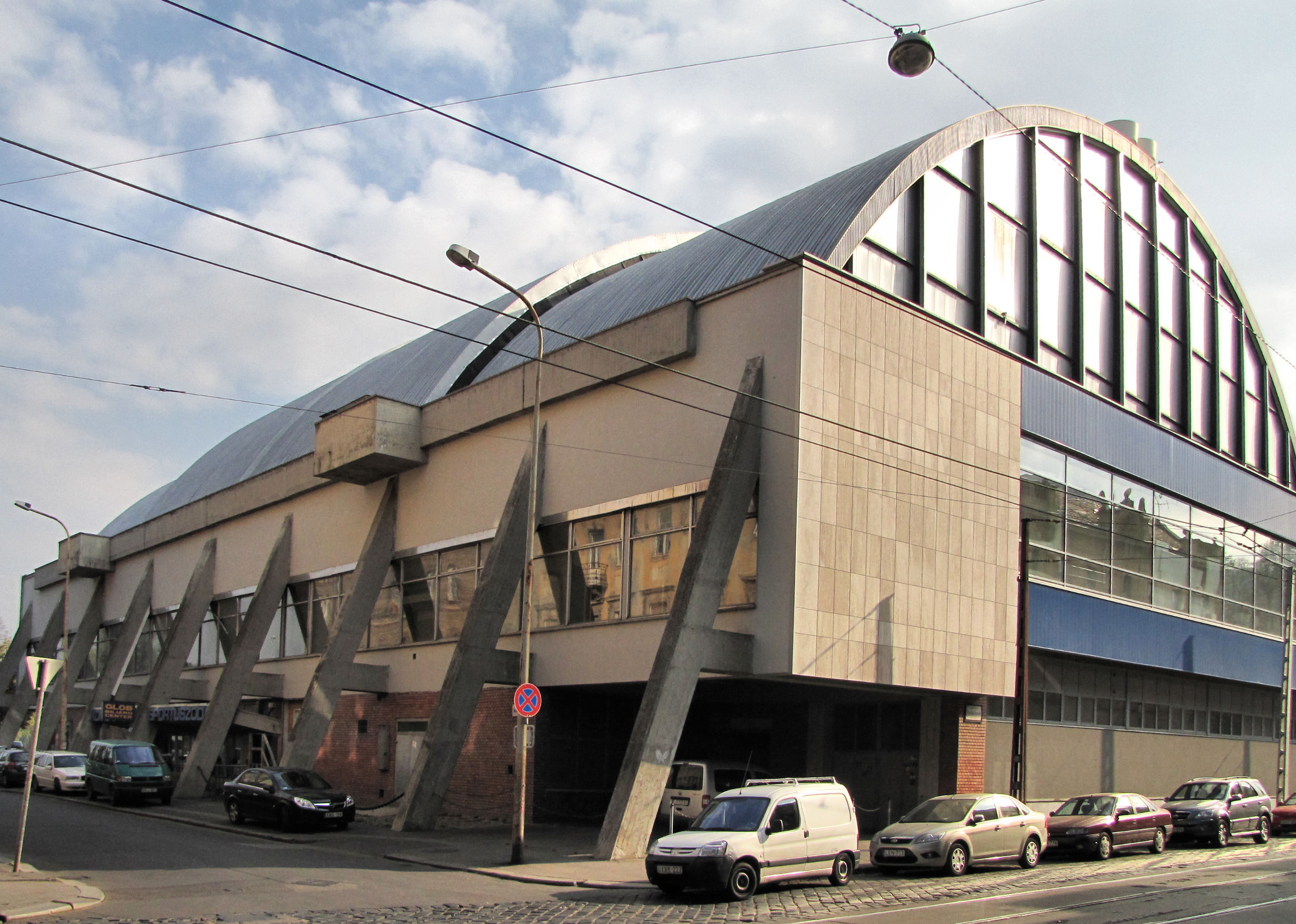
- The Császár-Komjádi Swimming Stadium in Budapest held the match
Szolnok	Eger
Országos Bajnokság I	Magyar Kupa
7	4
- Date: 22 December 2017
- Venue: Császár-Komjádi Swimming Stadium, Budapest

The 2017 Szuperkupa (known as the TippMix Férfi Szuper Kupa for sponsorship reasons) was played on 22 December 2017 in Budapest, Hungary. With Szolnoki Dózsa winning both the 2016–17 Országos Bajnokság I championship and the 2016 Magyar Kupa, the game was played between Szolnoki Dózsa and the 2016 Magyar Kupa runners-up, Egri VK.

== Teams ==
Team	Qualification
Szolnok	Winners of the 2016–17 Országos Bajnokság I
Eger	Runners-up of the 2016 Magyar Kupa

=== Squads ===
Szolnoki Dózsa
No.	Nat.	Player	Birth Date	Position	L/R
1	(Hungary)	Viktor Nagy	July 24, 1984	Goalkeeper	R
2	(Serbia) (Hungary)	Živko Gocić (c)	August 22, 1982	Guard	R
3	(Hungary)	Bence Bátori	December 28, 1991	Wing	R
4	(Hungary)	Gergő Zalánki	February 26, 1995	Centre back	L
5	(Hungary)	Zoltán Hangay	October 17, 1988	Wing	
6	(Hungary)	Tamás Mezei	September 24, 1990	Centre forward	L
7	(Serbia)	Milan Aleksić	May 13, 1986	Guard	L
8	(Australia)	Aaron Younger	September 25, 1991	Guard	R
9	(Serbia)	Andrija Prlainović	April 28, 1988	Centre back / wing	R
10	(Serbia) (Hungary)	Miloš Ćuk	December 21, 1990	Wing	R
11	(Hungary)	Gábor Kis	September 27, 1982	Centre forward	R
12	(Hungary)	Bence Fülöp	April 9, 1991	Guard	
13	(Hungary)	Dávid Jansik	February 28, 1991	Guard	
14	(Hungary)	Gergely Kardos	September 1, 1995	Goalkeeper	

Head coach: Sándor Cseh, Jr.

ZF-Eger
No.	Nat.	Player	Birth Date	Position	L/R
1	(Serbia) (Hungary)	Branislav Mitrović (c)	January 30, 1985	Goalkeeper	R
2	(Hungary)	Dániel Angyal	March 29, 1992	Guard	R
3	(Serbia)	Strahinja Rašović	March 9, 1993	Guard	R
4	(Serbia) (Hungary)	Marko Avramović	August 24, 1986		R
5	(Hungary)	Norbert Hosnyánszky	March 4, 1984	Centre back	R
6	(Hungary)	Bálint Lőrincz	March 10, 1994		R
7	(Hungary)	Ádám Decker	February 29, 1984	Guard	R
8	(Hungary)	Gergő Kovács	September 2, 1995		R
9	(Montenegro)	Uroš Čučković	April 25, 1990	Guard	R
10	(Greece)	Angelos Vlachopoulos	September 28, 1991		R
11	(Hungary)	Krisztián Bedő	May 4, 1993	Centre forward	R
12	(Hungary)	Balázs Hárai	April 5, 1987	Centre forward	R
13	(Hungary)	András Sári	August 7, 2001		R
14	(Hungary)	Boldizsár Csiszár	March 3, 1997	Goalkeeper	R

Head coach: Norbert Dabrowski

== Match ==
22 December 2017; 18:00 (CET)	Report	Szolnoki Dózsa	7–4	ZF-Eger	Komjádi Béla Sportuszoda, Budapest; Attendance: 800; Referees: Németh, Mucskai
22 December 2017; 18:00 (CET)	Report	Score by quarters: 3–1, 0–0, 3–2, 1–1			Komjádi Béla Sportuszoda, Budapest; Attendance: 800; Referees: Németh, Mucskai
22 December 2017; 18:00 (CET)	Report	Zalánki, Prlainović 2	Goals	Rašović 2	Komjádi Béla Sportuszoda, Budapest; Attendance: 800; Referees: Németh, Mucskai

2017 Szuperkupa
Winner

Szolnoki Dózsa
2nd title

V. Nagy – Gocić (c), Bátori, Zalánki, Mezei, Prlainović, D. Jansik
Reserves: Hangay, Aleksić, Younger, Ćuk, G. Kis, Fülöp, G. Kardos (goalkeeper)
Head coach: Sándor Cseh, Technical Director: István Kovács

== See also ==
- 2017–18 Országos Bajnokság I (National Championship of Hungary)
- 2017 Magyar Kupa (National Cup of Hungary)
