= 2017 LEN Super Cup =

Water polo match

| Szolnok | Ferencváros |
| (Hungary) | (Hungary) |
| 6 | 6 |
- Szolnok won 4–2 on penalties
- Date: 4 November 2017
- Venue: Császár-Komjádi Swimming Stadium, Budapest
- Attendance: 1,500

The 2017 LEN Super Cup was the 36th edition of the LEN Super Cup, an annual water polo match organised by LEN and contested by the reigning champions of the two main European club competitions, the LEN Champions League and the LEN Euro Cup. The match was played Szolnok, the winners of the 2016–17 LEN Champions League, and Ferencváros, the winners of the 2016–17 LEN Euro Cup.

It was played at the Császár-Komjádi Swimming Stadium in Budapest, Hungary, on 4 November 2017.

== Teams ==
| Team | Qualification | Previous participation (bold indicates winners) |
|---|---|---|
| (Hungary) Szolnok | Winners of the 2016–17 LEN Champions League | never played |
| (Hungary) Ferencváros | Winners of the 2016–17 LEN Euro Cup | **1978**, **1980** |

This was the second overall all-Hungarian Super Cup.

=== Squads ===
Szolnoki Dózsa
| № | **Nat.** | **Player** | **Birth Date** | **Position** | **L/R** |
| 1 | (Hungary) | Viktor Nagy | July 24, 1984 | Goalkeeper | R |
| 2 | (Serbia) (Hungary) | Živko Gocić (c) | August 22, 1982 | Guard | R |
| 3 | (Hungary) | Bence Bátori | December 28, 1991 | Wing | R |
| 4 | (Hungary) | Gergő Zalánki | February 26, 1995 | Centre back | L |
| 5 | (Hungary) | Dávid Jansik | February 28, 1991 | Guard | |
| 6 | (Hungary) | Tamás Mezei | September 24, 1990 | Centre forward | L |
| 7 | (Serbia) | Milan Aleksić | May 13, 1986 | Guard | L |
| 8 | (Australia) | Aaron Younger | September 25, 1991 | Guard | R |
| 9 | (Serbia) | Andrija Prlainović | April 28, 1988 | Centre back / wing | R |
| 10 | (Serbia) (Hungary) | Miloš Ćuk | December 21, 1990 | Wing | R |
| 11 | (Hungary) | Gábor Kis | September 27, 1982 | Centre forward | R |
| 12 | (Hungary) | Bence Fülöp | April 9, 1991 | Guard | |
| 13 | (Hungary) | Gergely Kardos | September 1, 1995 | Goalkeeper | |

Head coach: Sándor Cseh

FTC-PQS Waterpolo
| № | **Nat.** | **Player** | **Birth Date** | **Position** | **L/R** |
| 1 | (Hungary) | András Gárdonyi | February 6, 1986 | Goalkeeper | |
| 2 | (Hungary) | Tamás Sedlmayer | January 6, 1995 | Wing / centre back | |
| 3 | (Hungary) | Norbert Madaras (c) | December 1, 1979 | Wing / centre back | L |
| 4 | (Hungary) | Toni Német | January 14, 1994 | Centre forward | |
| 5 | (Hungary) | Márton Vámos | June 24, 1992 | Centre back / wing | L |
| 6 | (Hungary) (Spain) | Balázs Szirányi | January 10, 1983 | Centre forward | R |
| 7 | (Serbia) | Slobodan Nikić | January 25, 1983 | Centre forward | R |
| 8 | (Serbia) | Nikola Jakšić | January 17, 1997 | Guard | R |
| 9 | (Hungary) | Dániel Varga | September 25, 1983 | Guard / centre back | R |
| 10 | (Hungary) | Dénes Varga | March 29, 1987 | Centre back | R |
| 11 | (Hungary) | Szilárd Jansik | April 6, 1994 | Guard | |
| 12 | (Serbia) | Stefan Mitrović | March 29, 1988 | Centre back | R |
| 13 | (Hungary) | Soma Vogel | July 7, 1997 | Goalkeeper | |

Head coach: Zsolt Varga

== Match ==
| 4 November 2017; 17:45 (CET) | Report | Szolnoki Dózsa | 6–6 ^{(4–2 PSO)} (PSO) | FTC-PQS Waterpolo | Császár-Komjádi Swimming Stadium, Budapest; Referees: Stavridis (GRE), Alexandrescu (ROU) |
| 4 November 2017; 17:45 (CET) | Report | Score by quarters: 3–1, 2–3, 0–0, 1–2 PSO: 4–2 | | | Császár-Komjádi Swimming Stadium, Budapest; Referees: Stavridis (GRE), Alexandrescu (ROU) |
| 4 November 2017; 17:45 (CET) | Report | Younger 3 | Goals | Dé. Varga, Mitrović 3 | Császár-Komjádi Swimming Stadium, Budapest; Referees: Stavridis (GRE), Alexandrescu (ROU) |

== See also ==
- 2017 Women's LEN Super Cup
