= 2009 Magyar Kupa (men's water polo) =

Water polo tournament season

Tournament details
- Country: Hungary
- Teams: 16

Final positions
- Champions: TEVA-VasasPlaket
- Runner-up: ZF-Eger

Tournament statistics
- Top goal scorer(s): (Hungary) Dénes Varga (23 goals)

The 2009 Magyar Kupa, known as (Hungarian: Theodora Férfi Magyar Kupa) for sponsorship reasons, is the 83rd edition of the tournament.

== Quarter-finals ==
Quarter-final matches were played on 3 and 4 October 2009.

Team 1	Agg.	Team 2	1st leg	2nd leg
Szolnoki Főiskola-KÖZGÉP VSC (I)	14–21	Domino-Honvéd (I)	5–9	9–12
UNIQA-UTE (I)	15–23	ZF-Eger (I)	7–14	8–9
Szeged Beton VE (I)	22–14	BVSC-Zugló (I)	10–8	12–6
Pécsi Vízmű PVSK-Füszért (I)	10–24	TEVA-VasasPlaket (I)	3–13	7–11

== Final four ==
The final four will be held on 21 and 22 November 2009 at the Szőnyi úti uszoda in Budapest.

Semifinals
21 November, 12:30
TEVA-VasasPlaket	17
Szeged Beton VE	13
21 November, 14:15
ZF-Eger	11
Domino Honvéd	7

Final
22 November, 12:15
TEVA-VasasPlaket (a.e.t.)	14
ZF-Eger	13

=== Semi-finals ===
21 November; 12:30	Report	TEVA-VasasPlaket	17–13	Szeged Beton VE	Szőnyi úti uszoda, Budapest; Referees: Kiszelly, Petik
21 November; 12:30	Report	Score by quarters: 4–2, 6–1, 4–5, 3–5			Szőnyi úti uszoda, Budapest; Referees: Kiszelly, Petik
21 November; 12:30	Report	G. Kis 4	Goals	dr. Molnár 4	Szőnyi úti uszoda, Budapest; Referees: Kiszelly, Petik

21 November; 14:15	Report	ZF-Eger	11–7	Domino Honvéd	Szőnyi úti uszoda, Budapest; Referees: Horváth, Székely
21 November; 14:15	Report	Score by quarters: 1–2, 3–1, 4–2, 3–2			Szőnyi úti uszoda, Budapest; Referees: Horváth, Székely
21 November; 14:15	Report	four players 2	Goals	Bátori, Marnitz 2	Szőnyi úti uszoda, Budapest; Referees: Horváth, Székely

=== Final ===
22 November; 12:15	Report	TEVA-VasasPlaket	14–13	ZF-Eger	Szőnyi úti uszoda, Budapest; Referees: Németh, Székely
22 November; 12:15	Report	Score by quarters: 4–4, 3–3, 2–2, 3–3 OT: 1–1, 1–0			Szőnyi úti uszoda, Budapest; Referees: Németh, Székely
22 November; 12:15	Report	Dé. Varga 5	Goals	Biros 4	Szőnyi úti uszoda, Budapest; Referees: Németh, Székely

2009 Magyar Kupa
Winner
TEVA-VasasPlaket
15th Title

1 Viktor Nagy, 2 Ádám Decker, 3 Bence Fülöp, 4 Gergely Katonás, 5 Norbert Hosnyánszky, 6 Viktor Vörös, 7 Róbert Kovács Csatlós, 8 Krisztián Létay, 9 Dániel Varga, 10 Dénes Varga, 11 Gábor Kis, 12 Bálint Takács, 13 Dávid Hőna, 14 György Jónás
Head coach
László Földi

== See also ==
- 2009–10 Országos Bajnokság I
