= 2017 Magyar Kupa (men's water polo) =

Water polo tournament season

Hungarian Cup

Tournament details
- Country: Hungary
- Date: 23 September – 3 December 2017
- Teams: 17

Final positions
- Champions: Szolnoki Dózsa (6th title)
- Runners-up: A-HÍD OSC Újbuda

Tournament statistics
- Top goal scorer(s): (Serbia) Andrija Prlainović (23 goals)

The 2017 Magyar Kupa (known as the BENU Férfi Magyar Kupa for sponsorship reasons) was the 91st edition of the tournament.

== Schedule ==
The rounds of the 2017 competition were scheduled as follows:

Round	Draw date and time	Matches
Preliminary round	24 August 2017	23–24 September 2017
Quarter-finals	2 October 2017	25–26 November 2017
Final four	27 November 2017	2–3 December 2017

== Preliminary round ==
The first round ties were scheduled for 23 and 24 September 2017.

Number of teams per tier entering this round
Országos Bajnokság I	Országos Bajnokság I/B	Total
16 / 16	1 / 19	17 / 17

=== Group A ===
The tournament was played at Kemény Dénes Sportuszoda, Miskolc.

Team	Pld	W	D	L	GF	GA	GD	Pts
ZF-Eger	4	4	0	0	64	17	+47	12
PannErgy-Miskolci VLC	4	3	0	1	39	26	+13	9
PVSK-Mecsek Füszért	4	2	0	2	28	38	−10	6
Metalcom-Szentes	4	0	1	3	24	48	−24	1
Tatabányai VSE	4	0	1	3	23	49	−26	1

=== Group B ===
The tournament was played at Tiszaligeti uszoda (Vizilabda Aréna), Szolnok.

Team	Pld	W	D	L	GF	GA	GD	Pts
Szolnoki Dózsa	3	3	0	0	57	18	+39	9
VasasPlaket	3	2	0	1	35	31	+4	6
KSI SE	3	1	0	2	28	48	−20	3
UVSE	3	0	0	3	22	45	−23	0

=== Group C ===
The tournament was played at Kőér utcai uszoda, Budapest.

Team	Pld	W	D	L	GF	GA	GD	Pts
A-HÍD OSC Újbuda	3	3	0	0	31	19	+12	9
RacioNet Honvéd	3	1	1	1	21	25	−4	4
Debreceni VSE	3	0	2	1	22	26	−4	2
MKB-Euroleasing-BVSC-Zugló	3	0	1	2	24	28	−4	1

=== Group D ===
The tournament was played at Virágfürdő, Kaposvár.

Team	Pld	W	D	L	GF	GA	GD	Pts
FTC-PQS Waterpolo	3	3	0	0	53	9	+44	9
Kaposvári VK	3	2	0	3	24	26	−1	6
ContiTech-Szeged	3	0	1	2	18	39	−21	1
AVUS	3	0	1	2	18	40	−22	1

== Quarter-finals ==
Quarter-final matches were played on 25 and 26 November 2017.

Team 1	Agg.	Team 2	1st leg	2nd leg
RacioNet Honvéd (I)	9–32	Szolnoki Dózsa (I)	3–11	6–21
FTC-PQS Waterpolo (I)	25–15	PannErgy-Miskolci VLC (I)	12–9	13–6
VasasPlaket (I)	10–34	A-HÍD OSC Újbuda (I)	7–15	3–19
Kaposvári VK (I)	16–37	ZF-Eger (I)	11–16	5–21

== Final four ==
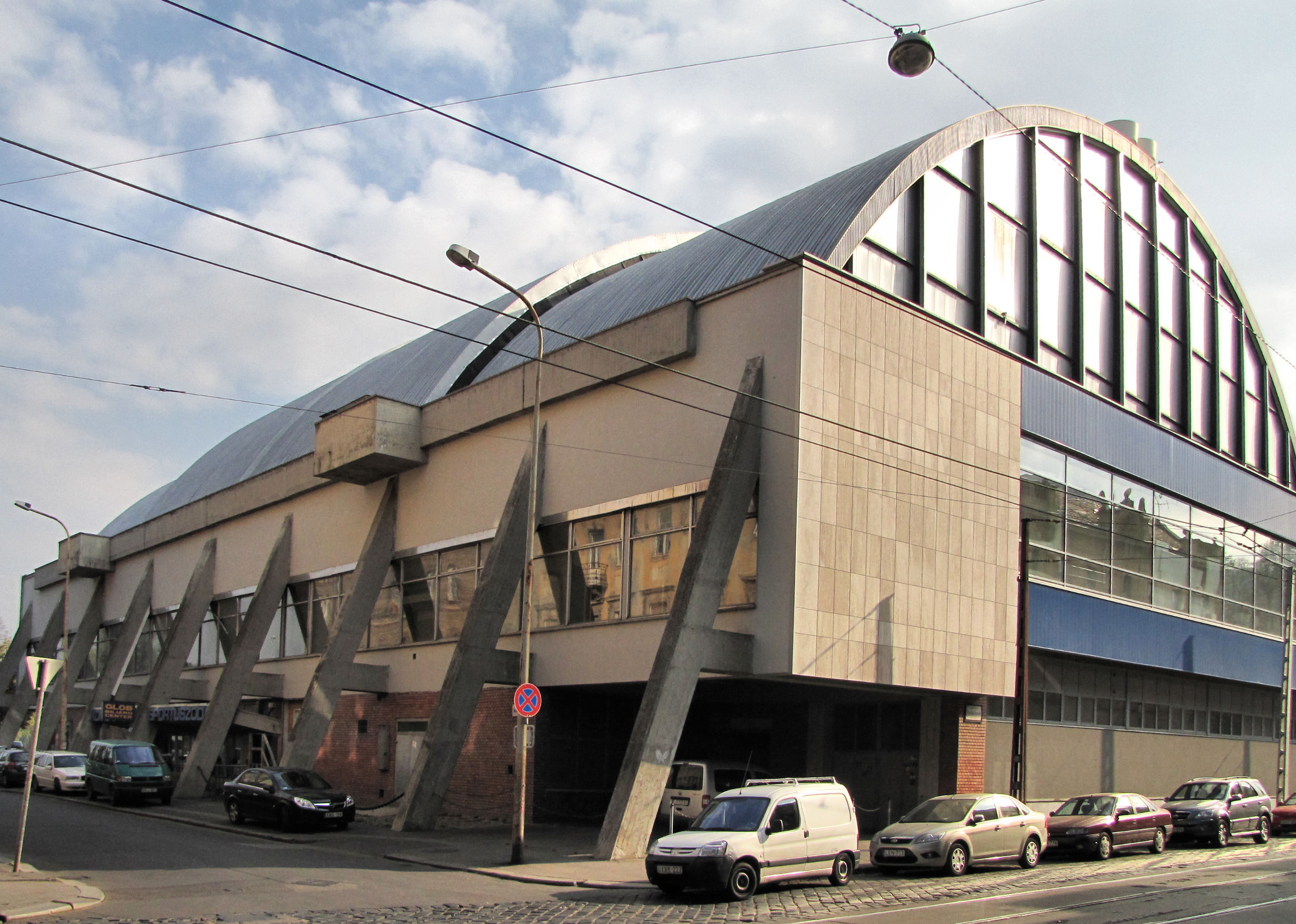
Császár-Komjádi Swimming Stadium, Budapest

The final four was held on 2 and 3 December 2017 at the Császár-Komjádi Swimming Stadium in the II. ker, Budapest.

Semi-finals
2 December, 16:00
ZF-Eger	7
A-HÍD OSC Újbuda	10
2 December, 17:45
Szolnoki Dózsa (pen.)	7 (6)
FTC-PQS Waterpolo	7 (5)

Final
3 December, 17:45
A-HÍD OSC Újbuda	4
Szolnoki Dózsa	13

=== Semi-finals ===
2 December 2017; 16:00 (CET)	Report	ZF-Eger	7–10	A-HÍD OSC Újbuda	Komjádi Béla Sportuszoda, Budapest; Attendance: 600; Referees: Molnár, Mucskai
2 December 2017; 16:00 (CET)	Report	Score by quarters: 2–3, 1–3, 4–3, 0–1			Komjádi Béla Sportuszoda, Budapest; Attendance: 600; Referees: Molnár, Mucskai
2 December 2017; 16:00 (CET)	Report	Angyal, Kovács 2	Goals	Erdélyi, Ubović 3	Komjádi Béla Sportuszoda, Budapest; Attendance: 600; Referees: Molnár, Mucskai

2 December 2017; 17:45 (CET)	Report	Szolnoki Dózsa	7–7 ^{(6–5 PSO)} (PSO)	FTC-PQS Waterpolo	Komjádi Béla Sportuszoda, Budapest; Attendance: 900; Referees: Petik, Rubos
2 December 2017; 17:45 (CET)	Report	Score by quarters: 2–2, 3–1, 0–3, 2–1 PSO: 6–5			Komjádi Béla Sportuszoda, Budapest; Attendance: 900; Referees: Petik, Rubos
2 December 2017; 17:45 (CET)	Report	Prlainović 5	Goals	Dé. Varga, Mitrović 3	Komjádi Béla Sportuszoda, Budapest; Attendance: 900; Referees: Petik, Rubos

=== Final ===
3 December 2017; 17:45 (CET)	Report	A-HÍD OSC Újbuda	4–13	Szolnoki Dózsa	Komjádi Béla Sportuszoda, Budapest; Attendance: 1,000; Referees: Székely, Németh
3 December 2017; 17:45 (CET)	Report	Score by quarters: 1–4, 0–3, 1–3, 2–3			Komjádi Béla Sportuszoda, Budapest; Attendance: 1,000; Referees: Székely, Németh
3 December 2017; 17:45 (CET)	Report	Tóth 3	Goals	Bátori, Zalánki, Prlainović 3	Komjádi Béla Sportuszoda, Budapest; Attendance: 1,000; Referees: Székely, Németh

2017 Magyar Kupa
Winner

Szolnoki Dózsa
6th title

V. Nagy – Gocić (c), Bátori, Zalánki, Mezei, Prlainović, D. Jansik
Reserves: Hangay, Aleksić, Younger, Ćuk, G. Kis, Fülöp, G. Kardos (goalkeeper)
Head coach: Sándor Cseh, Technical Director: István Kovács

==== Final standings ====
	Team
	Szolnoki Dózsa
Silver medal	A-HÍD OSC Újbuda
Bronze medal	FTC-PQS Waterpolo
Bronze medal	ZF-Eger

== See also ==
- 2017–18 Országos Bajnokság I (National Championship of Hungary)
- 2017 Szuperkupa (Super Cup of Hungary)
