= 2016–17 LEN Champions League =

Water polo sports season

- League: LEN Champions League
- Sport: Water Polo
- Duration: 30 September 2016 to 27 May 2017
- Teams: 12 (preliminary round); 31 (total)
- Season MVP: (Spain) Felipe Perrone (Jug Dubrovnik)
- Top scorer: (Spain) Felipe Perrone 42 goals (Jug Dubrovnik)

Final Six
- Finals champions: (Hungary) Szolnok (1st title)
- Runners-up: (Croatia) Jug
- Finals MVP: (Serbia) Andrija Prlainovic (Szolnok)

Champions League seasons
- ← 2015–16 2017–18 →

The 2016–17 LEN Champions League was the 54th edition of LEN's premier competition for men's water polo clubs. It ran from 30 September 2016 to 27 May 2017.

== Team allocation ==
8 teams are directly qualified for the preliminary round.

Preliminary round
(Croatia) Jug^{TH}	(Germany) Spandau 04	(Hungary) Szolnok	(Serbia) Partizan
(Spain) Atlètic-Barceloneta	(Greece) Olympiacos	(Italy) Pro Recco	(France) Olympic Nice
Qualification round II
(Croatia) Primorje	(Germany) Duisburg	(Hungary) Eger	(Serbia) Crvena zvezda
(Spain) Sabadell	(Greece) Vouliagmeni	(Italy) Brescia	(France) Marseille
Qualification round I
(Croatia) Mornar	(Russia) Sintez Kazan	(Montenegro) Jadran	(Germany) Waspo 98 Hannover
(Italy) Verona	(Hungary) Orvosegyetem	(Portugal) Portuense	(Malta) Valletta
(Netherlands) Utrecht	(Romania) Oradea	(Turkey) Galatasaray	(Poland) Arkonia Szczecin
(Netherlands) Barendrecht	(Romania) Steaua București	(Turkey) Enkaspor	

=== Round and draw dates ===
The schedule of the competition is as follows.

Phase	Round	First leg	Second leg
Qualifying	Qualification round I	30 September–2 October 2016	
Qualifying	Qualification round II	14–16 October 2016	
Qualifying	Qualification round III (play-off round)	26 October 2016	9 November 2016
Preliminary round	Matchday 1	30 November 2016	
Preliminary round	Matchday 2	10 December 2016	
Preliminary round	Matchday 3	21 December 2016	
Preliminary round	Matchday 4	18 January 2017	
Preliminary round	Matchday 5	8 February 2017	
Preliminary round	Matchday 6	18 February 2017	
Preliminary round	Matchday 7	1 March 2017	
Preliminary round	Matchday 8	22 March 2017	
Preliminary round	Matchday 9	5 April 2017	
Preliminary round	Matchday 10	26 April 2017	
Final 6	Quarter-finals	25 May 2017	
Final 6	Semi-finals	26 May 2017	
Final 6	Final	27 May 2017	

== Qualifying rounds ==
=== Qualification I ===
Fifteen teams take part in the Qualification round I. They were drawn into three groups of four teams and one group of three teams, whose played on 30 September−2 October 2016. Top 2 teams of each group advance to qualification round II.

==== Group A ====
Tournament was played in Oradea, Romania.

Pos	Team	Pld	W	D	L	GF	GA	GD	Pts	Qualification	(Romania) ORA	(Croatia) MOR	(Netherlands) UTR	(Turkey) GAL
1	(Romania) Oradea (H)	3	3	0	0	35	18	+17	9	Round II	—	10–6	11–5	14–7
2	(Croatia) Mornar	3	2	0	1	32	23	+9	6	Round II	—	—	—	13–7
3	(Netherlands) Utrecht	3	1	0	2	20	31	−11	3		—	6–13	—	—
4	(Turkey) Galatasaray	3	0	0	3	21	36	−15	0		—	—	7–9	—

Source: LEN
(H) Hosts

==== Group B ====
Tournament was played in Budapest, Hungary.

Pos	Team	Pld	W	D	L	GF	GA	GD	Pts	Qualification	(Hungary) ORV	(Germany) WAS	(Netherlands) BAR
1	(Hungary) Orvosegyetem (H)	2	2	0	0	32	17	+15	6	Round II	—	12–11	20–6
2	(Germany) Waspo 98 Hannover	2	1	0	1	30	17	+13	3	Round II	—	—	—
3	(Netherlands) Barendrecht	2	0	0	2	11	39	−28	0		—	5–19	—

Source: LEN
(H) Hosts

==== Group C ====
Tournament was played in Porto, Portugal.

Pos	Team	Pld	W	D	L	GF	GA	GD	Pts	Qualification	(Italy) VER	(Russia) SIN	(Turkey) ENK	(Portugal) POR
1	(Italy) Verona	3	2	1	0	59	17	+42	7	Round II	—	10–10	—	—
2	(Russia) Sintez Kazan	3	2	1	0	44	15	+29	7	Round II	—	—	14–3	—
3	(Turkey) Enkaspor	3	1	0	2	17	41	−24	3		6–21	—	—	—
4	(Portugal) Portuense (H)	3	0	0	3	9	56	−47	0		1–28	2–20	6–8	—

Source: LEN
(H) Hosts

==== Group D ====
Tournament was played in Valletta, Malta.

Pos	Team	Pld	W	D	L	GF	GA	GD	Pts	Qualification	(Montenegro) JAD	(Romania) STE	(Malta) VAL	(Poland) ARK
1	(Montenegro) Jadran	3	3	0	0	57	11	+46	9	Round II	—	9–7	—	23–3
2	(Romania) Steaua București	3	2	0	1	43	18	+25	6	Round II	—	—	19–6	—
3	(Malta) Valletta (H)	3	1	0	2	19	46	−27	3		1–25	—	—	—
4	(Poland) Arkonia Szczecin	3	0	0	3	8	52	−44	0		—	3–17	2–12	—

Source: LEN
(H) Hosts

=== Qualification II ===
Sixteen teams take part in the Qualification round II. Eight teams from first round and eight teams with wild cards. They were drawn into four groups of four teams, whose played on 14−16 October 2016. Top 2 teams of each group advance to qualification round III.

==== Group E ====
Tournament was played in Eger, Hungary.

Pos	Team	Pld	W	D	L	GF	GA	GD	Pts	Qualification	(Italy) VER	(Hungary) EGE	(France) MAR	(Croatia) MOR
1	(Italy) Verona	3	3	0	0	45	24	+21	9	Round III	—	—	18–9	17–6
2	(Hungary) Eger (H)	3	2	0	1	42	23	+19	6	Round III	9–10	—	18–5	15–8
3	(France) Marseille	3	1	0	2	27	47	−20	3		—	—	—	13–11
4	(Croatia) Mornar	3	0	0	3	25	45	−20	0		—	—	—	—

Source: LEN
(H) Hosts

==== Group F ====
Tournament was played in Brescia, Italy.

Pos	Team	Pld	W	D	L	GF	GA	GD	Pts	Qualification	(Italy) BRE	(Hungary) ORV	(Russia) SIN	(Serbia) CZB
1	(Italy) Brescia (H)	3	2	1	0	35	27	+8	7	Round III	—	11–11	15–11	9–5
2	(Hungary) Orvosegyetem	3	1	2	0	30	29	+1	5	Round III	—	—	11–11	—
3	(Russia) Sintez Kazan	3	1	1	1	33	30	+3	4		—	—	—	11–4
4	(Serbia) Crvena zvezda	3	0	0	3	16	28	−12	0		—	7–8	—	—

Source: LEN
(H) Hosts

==== Group G ====
Tournament was played in Herceg Novi, Montenegro.

Pos	Team	Pld	W	D	L	GF	GA	GD	Pts	Qualification	(Germany) WAS	(Montenegro) JAD	(Greece) VOU	(Germany) DUI
1	(Germany) Waspo 98 Hannover	3	2	0	1	26	22	+4	6 (Note: Waspo Hannover 18–17, Jadran 15–14, Vouliagmeni 17–19)	Round III	—	—	—	8–5
2	(Montenegro) Jadran (H)	3	2	0	1	27	18	+9	6	Round III	6–8	—	9–6	12–4
3	(Greece) Vouliagmeni	3	2	0	1	32	28	+4	6		11–10	—	—	—
4	(Germany) Duisburg	3	0	0	3	18	35	−17	0		—	—	9–15	—

Source: LEN
(H) Hosts

==== Group H ====
Tournament was played in Rijeka, Croatia.

Pos	Team	Pld	W	D	L	GF	GA	GD	Pts	Qualification	(Croatia) PRI	(Romania) ORA	(Spain) SAB	(Romania) STE
1	(Croatia) Primorje (H)	3	2	0	1	24	28	−4	6 (Note: Primorje–Oradea 9–7)	Round III	—	9–7	5–12	10–9
2	(Romania) Oradea	3	2	0	1	29	25	+4	6	Round III	—	—	—	—
3	(Spain) Sabadell	3	1	1	1	28	25	+3	4		—	6–10	—	—
4	(Romania) Steaua București	3	0	1	2	29	32	−3	1		—	10–12	10–10	—

Source: LEN
(H) Hosts

=== Qualification III ===
Eight teams take part in the Qualification round III. These teams played against each other over two legs on a home-and-away basis. The mechanism of the draws for each round was as follow:

- In the draw for the Qualification round III, the four group winners were seeded, and the four group runners-up were unseeded. The seeded teams were drawn against the unseeded teams. Teams from the same group could not be drawn against each other.

Key to colors
Seeded in qualification round III draw
Unseeded in qualification round III draw

Group	Winners	Runners-up
E	(Italy) Verona	(Hungary) Eger
F	(Italy) Brescia	(Hungary) Orvosegyetem
G	(Germany) Waspo 98 Hannover	(Montenegro) Jadran
H	(Croatia) Primorje	(Romania) Oradea

- 1st leg: 26 October 2016
- 2nd leg: 9 November 2016

Team 1	Agg.	Team 2	1st leg	2nd leg
Waspo 98 Hannover (Germany)	23–18	(Romania) Oradea	12–7	11–11
Brescia (Italy)	22–16	(Montenegro) Jadran	14–5	8–11
Primorje (Croatia)	11–23	(Hungary) Eger	6–12	5–11
Orvosegyetem (Hungary)	21–19	(Italy) Verona	10–6	11–13

== Preliminary round ==
Location of teams of the 2016–17 LEN Champions League group stage.
Red: Group A; Blue: Group B.

The regular season was played between 30 November 2016 and 26 April 2017. If teams are level on record at the end of the preliminary round, tiebreakers are applied in the following order:

1. Head-to-head record.
2. Head-to-head point differential.
3. Point differential during the Regular Season.
4. Points scored during the regular season.
5. Sum of quotients of points scored and points allowed in each Regular Season match.

In each group, teams played against each other home-and-away in a round-robin format. The matchdays were 30 November, 10 December, 21 December 2016 and 18 January, 8 February, 18 February, 1 March, 22 March, 5 April, 26 April 2017. The top three teams advanced to the final six.

The Final Six (quarterfinals, semifinals, third place game and final) were played in Budapest, Hungary from 25 to 27 May 2017.

=== Group A ===
Pos	Team	Pld	W	D	L	PF	PA	PD	Pts	Qualification	(Hungary) SZO	(Greece) OLY	(Italy) BRE	(Hungary) ORV	(Germany) SPA	(France) NIC
1	(Hungary) Szolnok	10	9	1	0	101	62	+39	28	Semifinals	—	5–5	8–4	10–8	12–7	17–4
2	(Greece) Olympiacos	10	7	1	2	90	63	+27	22	Quarterfinals	4–6	—	8–4	7–4	10–8	15–2
3	(Italy) Brescia	10	5	2	3	91	78	+13	17	Quarterfinals	9–10	13–10	—	6–6	9–6	13–4
4	(Hungary) Orvosegyetem	10	3	3	4	79	74	+5	12		8–9	7–8	7–7	—	5–5	11–9
5	(Germany) Spandau 04	10	2	1	7	75	95	−20	7		8–12	6–11	10–14	6–10	—	11–6
6	(France) Olympic Nice	10	0	0	10	60	124	−64	0		5–12	8–12	9–12	7–13	6–8	—

Source: LEN

=== Group B ===
Pos	Team	Pld	W	D	L	PF	PA	PD	Pts	Qualification	(Italy) PRO	(Hungary) EGE	(Croatia) JUG	(Spain) BAR	(Serbia) PAR	(Germany) WAS
1	(Italy) Pro Recco	10	10	0	0	116	63	+53	30	Semifinals	—	9–4	9–5	8–6	12–7	18–8
2	(Hungary) Eger	10	6	0	4	78	84	−6	18	Quarterfinals	7–11	—	6–5	10–9	8–4	10–7
3	(Croatia) Jug	10	5	2	3	115	92	+23	17	Quarterfinals	8–11	10–6	—	11–10	21–9	15–15
4	(Spain) Atlètic-Barceloneta	10	4	2	4	89	81	+8	14		6–11	10–6	7–7	—	12–5	12–10
5	(Serbia) Partizan	10	1	1	8	76	124	−48	4		5–17	8–9	9–16	4–8	—	13–9
6	(Germany) Waspo 98 Hannover	10	0	3	7	98	128	−30	3		7–10	11–12	10–17	9–9	12–12	—

Source: LEN

== Final Six ==
Danube Arena, Budapest, Hungary

Quarterfinals; 25 May 2017
B2	(Hungary) Eger	6
A3	(Italy) Brescia	4
A2	(Greece) Olympiacos	8
B3	(Croatia) Jug	11

Semifinals; 26 May 2017
A1	(Hungary) Szolnok	7
B2	(Hungary) Eger	5
B1	(Italy) Pro Recco	9
B3	(Croatia) Jug	10
5th place
A3	(Italy) Brescia	8
A2	(Greece) Olympiacos	5

Final; 27 May 2017
A1	(Hungary) Szolnok	10
B3	(Croatia) Jug	5
Third place
B2	(Hungary) Eger	6
B1	(Italy) Pro Recco	15

=== Quarterfinals ===
25 May 2017; 19:00	Report	Olympiacos (Greece)	8–11	(Croatia) Jug	Danube Arena, Budapest; Referees: (Spain) Xavier Buch (Russia) Sergey Naumov
25 May 2017; 19:00	Report	Score by quarters: 1–3, 1–4, 5–3, 1–1			Danube Arena, Budapest; Referees: (Spain) Xavier Buch (Russia) Sergey Naumov
25 May 2017; 19:00	Report	Genidounias 4	Goals	four players 2	Danube Arena, Budapest; Referees: (Spain) Xavier Buch (Russia) Sergey Naumov

25 May 2017; 20:30	Report	Eger (Hungary)	6–4	(Italy) Brescia	Danube Arena, Budapest; Referees: (Serbia) Vojin Putnikovic (Israel) Matan Schwartz
25 May 2017; 20:30	Report	Score by quarters: 2–2, 1–1, 1–1, 2–0			Danube Arena, Budapest; Referees: (Serbia) Vojin Putnikovic (Israel) Matan Schwartz
25 May 2017; 20:30	Report	Hárai 3	Goals	Nora 2	Danube Arena, Budapest; Referees: (Serbia) Vojin Putnikovic (Israel) Matan Schwartz

=== 5th place ===
26 May 2017; 17:30	Report	Olympiacos (Greece)	5–8	(Italy) Brescia	Danube Arena, Budapest; Referees: (Russia) Sergey Naumov (Israel) Matan Schwartz
26 May 2017; 17:30	Report	Score by quarters: 2–2, 0–3, 1–1, 2–2			Danube Arena, Budapest; Referees: (Russia) Sergey Naumov (Israel) Matan Schwartz
26 May 2017; 17:30	Report	Fountoulis 2	Goals	three players 2	Danube Arena, Budapest; Referees: (Russia) Sergey Naumov (Israel) Matan Schwartz

=== Semifinals ===
26 May 2017; 19:00	Report	Jug (Croatia)	10–9	(Italy) Pro Recco	Danube Arena, Budapest; Referees: (Romania) Adrian Tiberiu Alexandrescu (Spain) Xavier Buch
26 May 2017; 19:00	Report	Score by quarters: 4–2, 2–2, 3–4, 1–1			Danube Arena, Budapest; Referees: (Romania) Adrian Tiberiu Alexandrescu (Spain) Xavier Buch
26 May 2017; 19:00	Report	Lončar, García 2	Goals	Filipović 4	Danube Arena, Budapest; Referees: (Romania) Adrian Tiberiu Alexandrescu (Spain) Xavier Buch

26 May 2017; 20:30	Report	Eger (Hungary)	5–7	(Hungary) Szolnok	Danube Arena, Budapest; Referees: (Slovenia) Boris Margeta (Serbia) Vojin Putnikovic
26 May 2017; 20:30	Report	Score by quarters: 2–1, 0–2, 1–2, 2–2			Danube Arena, Budapest; Referees: (Slovenia) Boris Margeta (Serbia) Vojin Putnikovic
26 May 2017; 20:30	Report	five players 1	Goals	Younger, Prlainović 3	Danube Arena, Budapest; Referees: (Slovenia) Boris Margeta (Serbia) Vojin Putnikovic

=== Third place ===
27 May 2017; 15:15	Report	Pro Recco (Italy)	15–6	(Hungary) Eger	Danube Arena, Budapest; Referees: (Spain) Xavier Buch (Russia) Sergey Naumov
27 May 2017; 15:15	Report	Score by quarters: 3–1, 4–1, 3–2, 5–2			Danube Arena, Budapest; Referees: (Spain) Xavier Buch (Russia) Sergey Naumov
27 May 2017; 15:15	Report	Ivović 4	Goals	Vapenski 2	Danube Arena, Budapest; Referees: (Spain) Xavier Buch (Russia) Sergey Naumov

=== Final ===
27 May 2017; 16:45	Report	Jug (Croatia)	5–10	(Hungary) Szolnok	Danube Arena, Budapest; Referees: (Romania) Adrian Tiberiu Alexandrescu (Slovenia) Boris Margeta
27 May 2017; 16:45	Report	Score by quarters: 2–1, 2–5, 1–2, 0–2			Danube Arena, Budapest; Referees: (Romania) Adrian Tiberiu Alexandrescu (Slovenia) Boris Margeta
27 May 2017; 16:45	Report	Marković 2	Goals	Aleksić, Prlainović 3	Danube Arena, Budapest; Referees: (Romania) Adrian Tiberiu Alexandrescu (Slovenia) Boris Margeta

2016–17 LEN Champions League
Champions

Szolnok
1st title

Viktor Nagy, Márton Vámos, Živko Gocić, Tamás Mezei, Aaron Younger, Dénes Varga, Milan Aleksić, Andrija Prlainović, Ugo Crousillat, Gábor Kis, David Jansik, Peter Kotlar, Patrik Bagi, Zlotan Hangay, Istvan Kardos, Zsombor Szeghalmi, Tamas Bodoroczki, Kristof Szatmari, Bence Fulop,

Head coach
Sándor Cseh

=== Final standings ===
	Team
	(Hungary) Szolnok
Silver medal	(Croatia) Jug
Bronze medal	(Italy) Pro Recco
	(Hungary) Eger
	(Italy) Brescia
	(Greece) Olympiacos

=== Awards ===
Player of the Season	Top Scorer	Player of the final Six	Goalkeeper of the final Six
(Spain) Felipe Perrone (Jug)	(Spain) Felipe Perrone (Jug) 42 goals	(Serbia) Andrija Prlainovic (Szolnok)	(Hungary) Viktor Nagy (Szolnok)

Total 7 of the Season
LW	(Serbia) Andrija Prlainović (Szolnok)	CF	(Croatia) Luka Lončar (Jug)	RW	(Hungary) Márton Vámos (Szolnok)
LD	(Spain) Felipe Perrone (Jug)	CB	(Montenegro) Aleksandar Ivović (Pro Recco)	RD	(Serbia) Filip Filipović (Pro Recco)
GK	(Croatia) Marko Bijač (Jug)				

== See also ==
- 2016–17 LEN Euro Cup
- 2017 LEN Super Cup
