= 2008–09 Országos Bajnokság I (men's water polo) =

Water polo league season

OB I
- Season: 2008–09
- Champions: Vasas (16th title)
- Euroleague: TEVA-VasasPlaket; ZF-Eger; DOMINO Honvéd
- LEN Cup: Aprilia FTC-Fisher Klíma; Szeged Beton
- Top goalscorer: Márton Szívós (83 goals)

2008–09 Országos Bajnokság I (men's water polo) (known as the Vodafone férfi OB I osztályú Országos Bajnokság for sponsorship reasons) was the 103rd water polo championship in Hungary.

== First stage ==
#	Team	M	Gy	D	V	G+	G−	P
1.	TEVA-VasasPlaket	22	21	1	0	282	141	64
2.	DOMINO Honvéd	22	17	2	3	253	174	53
3.	ZF-Eger	22	17	0	5	271	164	51
4.	Aprilia FTC-Fisher Klíma	22	16	1	5	223	150	49
5.	Szeged Beton VE	22	13	3	6	220	165	42
6.	Pécsi Vízmű PVSK-Fűszért	22	11	2	9	190	186	35
7.	UNIQA-UTE	22	8	3	11	223	225	27
8.	BVSC-Atlantis Casino	22	8	0	14	190	226	24
9.	OSC-Opus Via	22	4	2	16	162	261	14
10.	Szolnoki Főiskola-KÖZGÉP	22	3	4	15	165	228	13
11.	Bodrogi Bau-Szentesi VK	22	2	2	18	148	286	8
12.	Androbau Fehérvár Póló SE	22	1	2	19	141	262	5

Championship Playoff
European competition Playoff
Relegation Playoff

Pld - Played; W - Won; L - Lost; G+ - Points for; G− - Points against; Diff - Difference; P - Points.

== Championship Playoff ==
Semifinals
1	TEVA-VasasPlaket	8	13
4	Aprilia FTC-Fisher Klíma	5	7
2	DOMINO Honvéd	5	10	4
3	ZF-Eger	10	7	10

Final
1	TEVA-VasasPlaket	7	10	8	10
3	ZF-Eger	8	9	7	8
Third place
2	DOMINO Honvéd	11	10
4	Aprilia FTC-Fisher Klíma	6	7

=== Final ===
- 1st leg

22 May; 19:30	Report	TEVA-VasasPlaket	7–8	ZF-Eger	Komjádi Béla Sportuszoda, Budapest; Referees: Kiszelly, ifj. Juhász
22 May; 19:30	Report	Score by quarters: 2–3, 2–1, 1–1, 2–3			Komjádi Béla Sportuszoda, Budapest; Referees: Kiszelly, ifj. Juhász
22 May; 19:30	Report	Kovács Cs. 3	Goals	Biros, Varga II 3	Komjádi Béla Sportuszoda, Budapest; Referees: Kiszelly, ifj. Juhász

- 2nd leg

24 May; 17:15	Report	ZF-Eger	9–10	TEVA-VasasPlaket	Bitskey Aladár uszoda, Eger; Referees: Petik, Székely
24 May; 17:15	Report	Score by quarters: 3–4, 3–3, 2–2, 1–1			Bitskey Aladár uszoda, Eger; Referees: Petik, Székely
24 May; 17:15	Report	Hegedűs, Cs. Kiss, Nyéki 2	Goals	Dá. Varga 5	Bitskey Aladár uszoda, Eger; Referees: Petik, Székely

- 3rd leg

27 May; 19:00	Report	TEVA-VasasPlaket	8–7	ZF-Eger	Komjádi Béla Sportuszoda, Budapest; Referees: Németh, dr. Fekete
27 May; 19:00	Report	Score by quarters: 1–4, 2–0, 3–2, 2–1			Komjádi Béla Sportuszoda, Budapest; Referees: Németh, dr. Fekete
27 May; 19:00	Report	G. Kis, M. Tóth 2	Goals	Biros 2	Komjádi Béla Sportuszoda, Budapest; Referees: Németh, dr. Fekete

- 4th leg

29 May; 19:30	Report	ZF-Eger	8–10	TEVA-VasasPlaket	Bitskey Aladár uszoda, Eger; Referees: Kiszelly, ifj. Juhász
29 May; 19:30	Report	Score by quarters: 2–2, 4–4, 0–2, 2–2			Bitskey Aladár uszoda, Eger; Referees: Kiszelly, ifj. Juhász
29 May; 19:30	Report	Feltham, Biros, Hegedűs 2	Goals	Dé. Varga 5	Bitskey Aladár uszoda, Eger; Referees: Kiszelly, ifj. Juhász

TEVA-VasasPlaket won the FINAL series 3–1.

2008–09 OB I
Winner
TEVA-VasasPlaket
16th Title

1 Viktor Nagy, 2 Bálint Takács, 3 Márk Kállay, 4 Gergely Katonás, 5 Norbert Hosnyánszky, 6 Viktor Vörös, 7 Róbert Kovács Csatlós, 8 Márton Tóth, 9 Dénes Varga, 10 Dániel Varga, 11 Barnabás Steinmetz, 12 Gábor Kis, 13 Dávid Hőna, 14 György Jónás
Head coach: László Földi

== European competition Playoff ==
#	Team	M	W	D	L	G+	G−	P	BP
5.	Szeged-Beton VE	6	6	0	0	68	46	30	12
6.	Uniqa-Újpesti TE	6	3	1	2	54	52	16	6
7.	Pécsi Vízmű-Pécsi VSK-Fűszért	6	2	0	4	61	63	15	9
8.	BVSC-Atlantis Casino	6	0	1	5	54	76	4	3

LEN Cup qualification

Pld - Played; W - Won; L - Lost; G+ - Points for; G− - Points against; Diff - Difference; P - Points; BP - Bonus Points.

== Relegation Playoff ==
#	Team	M	W	D	L	G+	G−	P	BP
9.	OSC-Opus Via	6	3	2	1	66	54	23	12
10.	Szolnoki Főiskola VSC-Közgép	6	4	0	2	52	48	21	9
11.	Bodrogi Bau-Szentesi VK	6	2	1	3	51	60	13	6
12.	Androbau-Fehérvár Póló SE	6	1	1	4	54	61	7	3

Relegation

Pld - Played; W - Won; L - Lost; G+ - Points for; G− - Points against; Diff - Difference; P - Points; Bp - Bonus Points.

== Final standing ==
Qualified for the 2009–10 LEN Euroleague
Qualified for the 2009–10 LEN Cup
Relegation to the 2009–10 OB I/B

Rank	Team
1st place, gold medalist(s)	TEVA-VasasPlaket
2nd place, silver medalist(s)	ZF-Eger
3rd place, bronze medalist(s)	Domino-Honvéd
4	Ferencvárosi TC-Aprilia-Fisher Klíma
5	Szeged-Beton VE
6	Uniqa-Újpesti TE
7	Pécsi Vízmű-Pécsi VSK-Fűszért
8	BVSC-Atlantis Casino
9	OSC-Opus Via
10	Szolnoki Főiskola VSC-Közgép
11	Bodrogi Bau-Szentesi VK
12	Androbau-Fehérvár Póló SE

== Sources ==
- Magyar sportévkönyv 2010
