= 2016 Magyar Kupa (men's water polo) =

Water polo tournament season

Hungarian Cup

Tournament details
- Country: Hungary
- Teams: 18

Final positions
- Champions: Szolnoki Dózsa-KÖZGÉP (5th title)
- Runners-up: ZF-Eger

Tournament statistics
- Top goal scorer(s): (Hungary) Márton Vámos (20 goals)

The 2016 Magyar Kupa, known as (Hungarian: BENU Férfi Magyar Kupa) for sponsorship reasons, is the 90th edition of the tournament.

== Schedule ==
The rounds of the 2016–17 competition are scheduled as follows:

Round	Draw date and time	Matches
Preliminary round	22 August 2016, 12:00 CEST	23, 24 September 2016
Quarter-finals	7 November 2016, 12:00 CET	2, 4 December 2016
Final four	5 December 2016, 12:00 CET	17–18 December 2016

== Matches ==
=== Preliminary round ===
The first round ties are scheduled for 23, 24 September 2016.

Number of teams per tier entering this round
Országos Bajnokság I	Országos Bajnokság I/B	Total
16 / 16	2 / 20	18 / 18

==== Group A ====
Tournament will be played at Kemény Dénes Sportuszoda, Miskolc.

Team	Pld	W	D	L	GF	GA	GD	Pts
ZF-Eger	4	4	0	0	64	30	+34	12
PannErgy-Miskolci VLC	4	3	0	1	47	30	+17	9
VasasPlaket	4	2	0	2	49	49	0	6
Kaposvári VK	4	1	0	3	35	40	−5	3
UVSE Margitsziget (UVSE II.)	4	0	0	4	29	75	−46	0

==== Group B ====
Tournament will be played at Kanizsa Uszoda és Strandfürdő, Nagykanizsa.

Team	Pld	W	D	L	GF	GA	GD	Pts
Szolnoki Dózsa-KÖZGÉP	4	4	0	0	79	25	+54	12
RacioNet Honvéd	4	3	0	1	58	38	+20	9
UVSE	4	2	0	2	46	53	−7	6
EBP Tatabánya	4	1	0	2	40	43	−3	3
Kanizsa VSE	4	0	0	4	20	84	−64	0

==== Group C ====
Tournament will be played at Abay Nemes Oszkár Sportuszoda, Pécs.

Team	Pld	W	D	L	GF	GA	GD	Pts
A-HÍD OSC Újbuda	3	3	0	0	47	19	+28	9
ContiTech-Szeged Diapolo	3	2	0	1	35	32	+3	6
KSI SE	3	1	0	2	22	44	−22	3
PVSK-Mecsek Füszért	3	0	0	3	40	46	−9	0

==== Group D ====
Tournament will be played at Szőnyi úti uszoda, Budapest.

Team	Pld	W	D	L	GF	GA	GD	Pts
FTC-PQS Waterpolo	3	3	0	0	50	15	+35	9
BVSC-Zugló	3	1	1	1	28	26	+2	4
Debreceni VSE	3	1	1	1	24	29	−5	4
Metalcom-Szentes	3	0	0	3	15	47	−32	0

=== Quarter-finals ===
Quarter-final matches were played on 26 November and 3 December 2016.

Team 1	Agg.	Team 2	1st leg	2nd leg
A-HÍD OSC Újbuda (I)	21–13	BVSC-Zugló (I)	13–8	8–5
ContiTech-Szeged Diapolo (I)	16–18	RacioNet Honvéd (I)	8–9	8–9
ZF-Eger (I)	26–18	PannErgy-Miskolci VLC (I)	16–7	10–11
Szolnoki Dózsa-KÖZGÉP (I)	21–14	FTC-PQS Waterpolo (I)	14–7	7–7

== Final four ==
The final four will be held on 17 and 18 December 2016 at the Tüskecsarnok Uszoda in Budapest, XI. ker.

Semi-finals
17 December, 16:00
A-HÍD OSC Újbuda	6
ZF-Eger	9
17 December, 17:45
Szolnoki Dózsa-KÖZGÉP	11
RacioNet Honvéd	5

Final
18 December, 18:00
ZF-Eger	4
Szolnoki Dózsa-KÖZGÉP	10

=== Semi-finals ===
17 December 2016; 16:00 (CET)	Report	A-HÍD OSC Újbuda	6–9	ZF-Eger	Tüskecsarnok uszoda, Budapest; Referees: Németh, Mucskai
17 December 2016; 16:00 (CET)	Report	Score by quarters: 0-3, 2-2, 3-2, 1-2			Tüskecsarnok uszoda, Budapest; Referees: Németh, Mucskai
17 December 2016; 16:00 (CET)	Report	Brguljan 2	Goals	Erdélyi 3	Tüskecsarnok uszoda, Budapest; Referees: Németh, Mucskai

17 December 2016; 17:45 (CET)	Report	Szolnoki Dózsa-KÖZGÉP	11–5	RacioNet Honvéd	Tüskecsarnok uszoda, Budapest; Referees: Székely, dr. Marosvári
17 December 2016; 17:45 (CET)	Report	Score by quarters: 4-2, 3-3, 2-0, 2-0			Tüskecsarnok uszoda, Budapest; Referees: Székely, dr. Marosvári
17 December 2016; 17:45 (CET)	Report	Fülöp 3	Goals	Fejős 3	Tüskecsarnok uszoda, Budapest; Referees: Székely, dr. Marosvári

=== Final ===
18 December 2016; 18:00 (CET)	Report	ZF-Eger	4–10	Szolnoki Dózsa-KÖZGÉP	Tüskecsarnok uszoda, Budapest; Attendance: 800; Referees: dr. Molnár T., Molnár P.
18 December 2016; 18:00 (CET)	Report	Score by quarters: 0-1, 3-4, 1-2, 0-3			Tüskecsarnok uszoda, Budapest; Attendance: 800; Referees: dr. Molnár T., Molnár P.
18 December 2016; 18:00 (CET)	Report	four players 1	Goals	Aleksić 3	Tüskecsarnok uszoda, Budapest; Attendance: 800; Referees: dr. Molnár T., Molnár P.

2016 Magyar Kupa
Winner

Szolnoki Dózsa-KÖZGÉP
5th title

V. Nagy – Gocić (c), Vámos, Mezei, Prlainović, Dénes Varga, D. Jansik
Reserves: Szatmári, Z. Hangay, Aleksić, Younger, G. Kis, Fülöp, G. Kardos (goalkeeper)
Head coach
ifj. Sándor Cseh

==== Final standings ====
	Team
	Szolnoki Dózsa-KÖZGÉP
Silver medal	ZF-Eger
Bronze medal	RacioNet Honvéd
Bronze medal	A-HÍD OSC Újbuda

== See also ==
- 2016–17 Országos Bajnokság I
