= Viktor Nagy =

Hungarian water polo goalkeeper

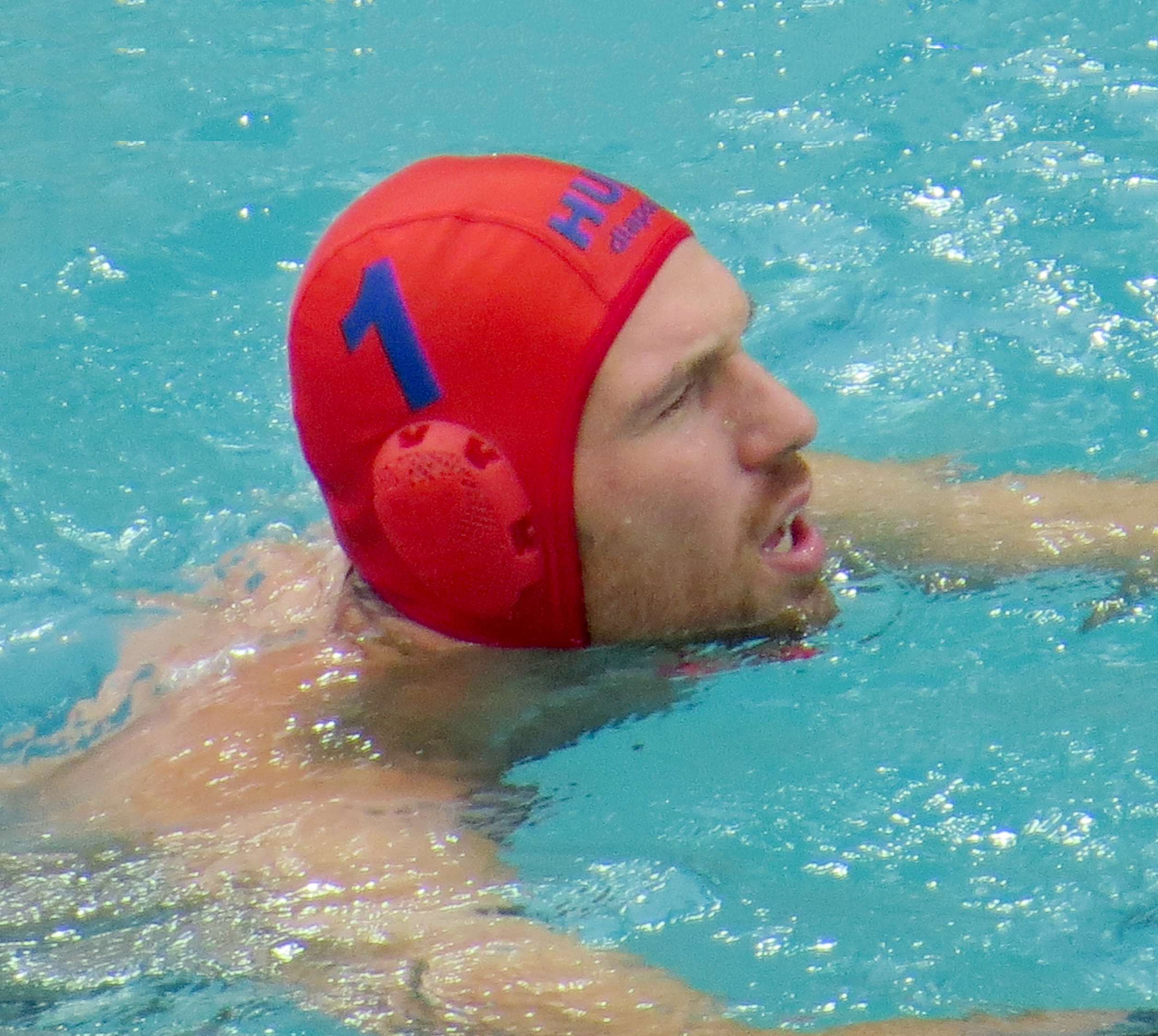
- Nagy at the 2016 Summer Olympics

Personal information
- Nickname: Vik
- Nationality: Hungarian
- Born: 24 July 1984 (age 42) Budapest, Hungary
- Height: 1.98 m (6 ft 6 in)
- Weight: 96 kg (212 lb)

Sport
- Sport: Water polo
- Handedness: Right
- Position: Goalkeeper

Youth career
- Years: Team
- –: BVSC

Senior clubs
- Years: Team
- –2004: BVSC
- 2004–2013: Vasas
- 2013–2014: Szeged
- 2014–2021: Szolnok
National team
- Years: Team
- 2006–2021: Hungary
Medal record
Men's water polo
Representing Hungary
Olympic Games
Bronze medal – third place	2020 Tokyo	Team
World Championship
Gold medal – first place	2013 Barcelona	Team
Silver medal – second place	2007 Melbourne	Team
Silver medal – second place	2017 Budapest	Team
European Championship
Gold medal – first place	2020 Budapest	Team
Silver medal – second place	2014 Budapest	Team
Bronze medal – third place	2008 Málaga	Team
Bronze medal – third place	2016 Belgrade	Team
FINA World League
Silver medal – second place	2007 Berlin	Team
Silver medal – second place	2013 Chelyabinsk	Team
Silver medal – second place	2014 Dubai	Team
Silver medal – second place	2018 Budapest	Team
World Cup
Gold medal – first place	2018 Berlin	Team
Silver medal – second place	2014 Kazakhstan	Team
Silver medal – second place	2006 Budapest	Team
- Updated on 2 August 2023

Viktor Nagy (born 24 July 1984) is a Hungarian water polo goalkeeper. He took up the sport at the age of 10 at the Szolnoki Dózsa in Budapest, and made his first appearance for the Hungarian national team in 2006. He won the world title in 2013 and competed at the 2012, 2016, and 2020 Summer Olympics

He is currently the assistant water polo coach at Santa Clara University.

== Personal life ==
Nagy is the brother of racing driver Dániel Nagy and a great-grandson of painter Tivadar Csontváry Kosztka. He is married to Blanka. They have a son, Samuel, and a daughter, Olivia. He is right-handed.

== Honors ==
=== Olympics ===
- 2020 Tokyo Olympics: Bronze medal, Hungary
- 2016 Rio de Janeiro Olympics
- 2012 London Olympics

=== National ===
- World Championships: Gold medal - 2013; Silver medal - 2007
- European Championship: Gold medal - 2020; Silver medal - 2014; Bronze medal - 2008, 2016
- FINA World League: Silver medal - 2007, 2013, 2014, 2018

=== Club ===
BVSC (BVSC-Brendon)

- Hungarian Cup: 2002–03
- Hungarian Super Cup: 2003

Vasas (TEVA-VasasPlaket, TEVA-Vasas-UNIQA, TEVA-Vasas)

- Hungarian Championship: 2006–07, 2007–08, 2008–09, 2009–10, 2011–12
- Hungarian Cup: 2004, 2005, 2009
- Hungarian Super Cup: 2006

Szeged (Diapolo Szeged)

- Hungarian Championship: 2012–13

Szolnok (Szolnoki Dózsa-KÖZGÉP)

- LEN Champions League: 2016–17
- LEN Euro Cup: 2020–21
- LEN Super Cup: 2017
- Hungarian Championship: 2014–15, 2015–16, 2016–17, 2020–21
- Hungarian Cup: 2014, 2016, 2017
- Hungarian Super Cup: 2016, 2017

== Awards ==
- Steinmetz János-vándordíj (Best Goalkeeper in OB I): 2007, 2008, 2010, 2012, 2015
- Swimming World Magazine's man water polo ''World Player of the Year "award: 2013
- Best Goalkeeper of 2013 World Championship
- Best Goalkeeper of 2016 European Championship
- Best Goalkeeper of 2018 World League
- 2013 World Championship Team of the Tournament
- 2017 World Championship Team of the Tournament
- Bes Goalkeeper of 2016–17 Final Six LEN Champions League

Orders

- Silver Cross of the Cross of Merit of Hungary (2012)

== See also ==
- Hungary men's Olympic water polo team records and statistics
- List of men's Olympic water polo tournament goalkeepers
- List of world champions in men's water polo
- List of World Aquatics Championships medalists in water polo
