= Szolnoki Vízilabda SC =

Water polo club

Szolnoki Dózsa
- Full name: Szolnoki Vízilabda Sport Club
- Founded: 1921; 105 years ago
- League: Országos Bajnokság I
- Based in: Szolnok, Hungary
- Arena: Vizilabda Aréna (Capacity: 1,100)
- Colors: Blue and white
- President: Zoltán Mohi
- Head coach: Zoltán Hangay
- Manager: István Kovács
- Championships: 1 Champions League; 1 Euro Cup; 1 LEN Super Cup; 10 Hungarian Championships; 6 Hungarian Cups; 2 Hungarian Super Cups
- 2021–22: Országos Bajnokság I, 4th of 14
- Website: vizilabda-szolnok.hu

Szolnoki Vízilabda Sport Club is a professional water polo team based in Szolnok, Hungary. Founded in 1921, it plays in OB I, the top division championship in the country, which they won on nine occasions.

The club produced several of the most successful Hungarian water polo players, including Olympic champions Ottó Boros, István Hasznos, Tivadar Kanizsa and European champion István Pintér.

== Naming history ==
- Szolnoki MÁV: (1921 – 1950)
- Szolnoki Dózsa: (1950 – 1973)
- Vízügy-Dózsa: (1973 – 1976)
- Szolnoki Vízügy SE: (1977 – 1990/91)
- Szolnoki Vízügy-RC Cola: (1991/92) - the first naming sponsor
- Elektrosoft SE Szolnok: (1992/93 – 1993/94)
- Szolnoki VSE: (1994/95 – 1995/96)
- Szolnoki MTE: (1996/97 – 1997/98)
- Szolnoki VSC: (1998/99 – 2005/06)
- Szolnoki Főiskola VSC: (2006/07 – 2007/08)
- Szolnoki Főiskola-KÖZGÉP: (2008/09 – 2010/11)
- Szolnoki Dózsa-KÖZGÉP: (2011/12 – 2016/17)
- Szolnoki Dózsa: (2017/18 – ... )

== Honours ==
=== Domestic competitions ===
- Országos Bajnokság I (National Championship of Hungary)

Champions (10): 1954, 1957, 1958, 1959, 1961, 1964, 2014–15, 2015–16, 2016–17, 2020–21
Runners-up (6): 1963, 1970, 1986–87, 2012–13, 2013–14, 2017–18
Third place (6): 1960, 1962, 1983, 1984–85, 1987–88, 2018–19

- Magyar Kupa (National Cup of Hungary)

Winners (6): 1966, 1968, 1985, 2014, 2016, 2017
Finalist (4): 1954, 2012, 2013, 2015, 2020

- Szuperkupa (Super Cup of Hungary)

Winners (2): 2016, 2017

=== European competitions ===
- LEN Champions League

Winners (1): 2016–17

- LEN Euro Cup

Winners (1): 2020–21
Quarter-finalist (1): 2012–13

- LEN Super Cup

Winners (1): 2017

== Current squad ==
Season 2022–23

| No. | Player | Birth Date | Position | L/R |
| 1 | (Hungary) Ottó Józsa | July 19, 1995 (age 31) | Goalkeeper | |
| 2 | (Hungary) Dávid Belényesi | April 21, 2003 (age 23) | | |
| 3 | (Hungary) Zsombor Szeghalmi | September 4, 2002 (age 23) | | |
| 4 | (Hungary) Norman Schmölcz | January 29, 2000 (age 26) | | |
| 5 | (Hungary) Attila Pető | February 11, 2003 (age 23) | | |
| 6 | (Hungary) György Ágh | September 16, 1999 (age 26) | Centre forward | |
| 7 | (Hungary) Dávid Jansik | February 28, 1991 (age 35) | Guard | |
| 8 | (Hungary) Gergő Kovács | September 2, 1995 (age 30) | | |
| 9 | (Hungary) Zsombor Vismeg | March 14, 2003 (age 23) | | |
| 10 | (Hungary) Mátyás Pásztor | February 20, 1987 (age 39) | | |
| 11 | (Hungary) Bertold Vámosi | June 17, 2001 (age 25) | Centre forward | |
| 12 | (Hungary) András Teleki | July 15, 1998 (age 28) | | |
| 13 | (Hungary) Donát Simon | July 9, 2005 (age 21) | | |
| 14 | (Hungary) Márk Bányai | December 8, 1999 (age 26) | Goalkeeper | |

=== Staff ===
Technical staff

- Head Coach: (Hungary) Zoltán Hangay
- Assistant Coach: (Hungary) Róbert Hangay
- Fitness Coach: (Hungary) Gergő Vincze

Management

- Technical Director: (Hungary) István Kovács
- Club Director: (Hungary) Beáta Ujszászi

=== Transfers (2017-18) ===
Source: vizipolo.hu

In:

- (Hungary) Bence Bátori (from Orvosegyetem)
- (Serbia) Miloš Ćuk (from Eger)
- (Hungary) Gergő Zalánki (from Orvosegyetem)

Out:

- (France) Ugo Crousillat (to Pays d'Aix)
- (Hungary) Dénes Varga (to Ferencváros)
- (Hungary) Márton Vámos (to Ferencváros)

== Recent seasons ==
As of 2 September 2023.

| Season | Tier | League | Pos. | Domestic cup | European competitions | |
|---|---|---|---|---|---|---|
| 1984–85 | 1 | OB I | 3rd | Round of 16 | | |
| 1985–86 | 1 | OB I | 4th | Champion | | |
| 1986–87 | 1 | OB I | 2nd | Quarterfinalist | 2 Cup Winners' Cup | |
| 1987–88 | 1 | OB I | 3rd | Round of 16 | | |
| 1988–89 | 1 | OB I | 4th | Third place | | |
| 1989–90 | 1 | OB I | 7th | Round of 16 | | |
| 1990–91 | 1 | OB I | 9th | Quarterfinalist | | |
| 1991–92 | 1 | OB I | 5th | Quarterfinalist | | |
| 1992–93 | 1 | OB I | 8th | | | |
| 1993–94 | 1 | OB I | 5th | | | |
| 1994–95 | 1 | OB I | 10th | | | |
| 1995–96 | 1 | OB I | 9th | | | |
| 1996–97 | 1 | OB I | 9th | | | |
| 1997–98 | 1 | OB I | 7th | | | |
| 1998–99 | 1 | OB I | 8th | | | |
| 1999–00 | 1 | OB I | 9th | | | |
| 2000–01 | 1 | OB I | 11th | | | |
| 2001–02 | 1 | OB I | 10th | Round of 16 | | |
| 2002–03 | 1 | OB I | 11th | Quarterfinalist | | |
| 2003–04 | 1 | OB I | 10th | did not held | | |
| 2004–05 | 1 | OB I | 9th | | | |
| 2005–06 | 1 | OB I | 7th | | | |
| 2006–07 | 1 | OB I | 9th | | | |
| 2007–08 | 1 | OB I | 12th^{1} | | | |
| 2008–09 | 1 | OB I | 10th | | | |
| 2009–10 | 1 | OB I | 6th | Quarterfinalist | | |
| 2010–11 | 1 | OB I | 5th | Quarterfinalist | | |
| 2011–12 | 1 | OB I | 6th | Semifinalist | 2 Euro Cup | SF |
| 2012–13 | 1 | OB I | 2nd | Runner-up | 2 Euro Cup | QF |
| 2013–14 | 1 | OB I | 2nd | Runner-up | 1 Champions League | QR3 |
| 2014–15 | 1 | OB I | 1st | Champion | 1 Champions League | 6th |
| 2015–16 | 1 | OB I | 1st | Runner-up | 1 Champions League | 3rd |
| 2016–17 | 1 | OB I | 1st | Champion | 1 Champions League | C |
| 2017–18 | 1 | OB I | 2nd | Champion | LEN Super Cup | C |
| 2017–18 | 1 | OB I | 2nd | Champion | 1 Champions League | 5th |
| 2018–19 | 1 | OB I | 3rd | Quarterfinalist | 1 Champions League | PR |
| 2019–20 | 1 | OB I | 3rd^{2} | Semifinalist | 1 Champions League | —^{2} |
| 2020–21 | 1 | OB I | 1st | Runner-up | 1 Champions League | QR |
| 2020–21 | 1 | OB I | 1st | Runner-up | 2 Euro Cup | C |
| 2021–22 | 1 | OB I | 4th | Runner-up | LEN Super Cup | F |
| 2021–22 | 1 | OB I | 4th | Runner-up | 1 Champions League | QR3 |
| 2021–22 | 1 | OB I | 4th | Runner-up | 2 Euro Cup | QF |
| 2022–23 | 1 | OB I | 6th | Quarterfinalist | 2 Euro Cup | QF |
| 2023–24 | 1 | OB I | | Quarterfinalist | 2 Euro Cup | |

^1 Remained in the league due to the resignation of other teams to play in the league.
^2 Cancelled due to the COVID-19 pandemic.

=== In European competition ===
- Participations in Champions League (European Cup, Euroleague): 8x
- Participations in Euro Cup (LEN Cup): 3x
- Participations in Cup Winners' Cup: 1x

| Season | Competition | Round | Club | Home | Away | Aggregate |
|---|---|---|---|---|---|---|
| 1964-65 | European Cup | Semi-final round | (Soviet Union) CSKA Moscow | 2-5 | | 4th place |
| 1964-65 | European Cup | Semi-final round | (Romania) Dinamo București | 3-5 | | 4th place |
| 1964-65 | European Cup | Semi-final round | (East Germany) Dinamo Magdeburg | 2-5 | | 4th place |
| 1986-87 | Cup Winners' Cup | | | | | |
| 2011-12 | Euro Cup | Round of 16 | (Russia) Shturm Ruza | 13-13 | 5-7 | 18–20 |
| 2011-12 | Euro Cup | Quarter-finals | (Russia) Sintez Kazan | 11-7 | 6-5 | 17–12 |
| 2011-12 | Euro Cup | Semi-finals | (Spain) Sabadell | 10-10 | 8-9 | 18–19 |
| 2012-13 | Euro Cup | Quarter-finals | (Italy) Florentia | 10-9 | 6-8 | 16–17 |
| 2013-14 | Champions League | elimination in Third qualifying round | | | | |
| 2014-15 | Champions League; Sixth place | Preliminary round (Group B) | (Croatia) Jug Dubrovnik | 8-7 | 9-11 | 2nd place |
| 2014-15 | Champions League; Sixth place | Preliminary round (Group B) | (Serbia) Partizan | 12-7 | 13-7 | 2nd place |
| 2014-15 | Champions League; Sixth place | Preliminary round (Group B) | (Turkey) Galatasaray | 15-11 | 17-12 | 2nd place |
| 2014-15 | Champions League; Sixth place | Preliminary round (Group B) | (Germany) Spandau 04 | 11-7 | 17-7 | 2nd place |
| 2014-15 | Champions League; Sixth place | Preliminary round (Group B) | (Croatia) Primorje Rijeka | 13-12 | 7-9 | 2nd place |
| 2014-15 | Champions League; Sixth place | Quarter-final (F6) | (Spain) Barceloneta | 6–6 (3–4 p) | | |
| 2014-15 | Champions League; Sixth place | 5th-6th placement (F6) | (Hungary) Eger | 7–8 | | |
| 2015-16 | Champions League; Third place | Preliminary round (Group B) | (Italy) Pro Recco | 12-11 | 11-14 | 2nd place |
| 2015-16 | Champions League; Third place | Preliminary round (Group B) | (Serbia) Partizan | 12-9 | 14-9 | 2nd place |
| 2015-16 | Champions League; Third place | Preliminary round (Group B) | (Croatia) Jug Dubrovnik | 13-10 | 9-10 | 2nd place |
| 2015-16 | Champions League; Third place | Preliminary round (Group B) | (Turkey) Galatasaray | 16-7 | 14-7 | 2nd place |
| 2015-16 | Champions League; Third place | Preliminary round (Group B) | (Hungary) OSC | 8-7 | 12-6 | 2nd place |
| 2015-16 | Champions League; Third place | Quarter-final (F6) | (Spain) Barceloneta | 7–5 | | |
| 2015-16 | Champions League; Third place | Semi-final (F6) | (Greece) Olympiacos | 7–8 | | |
| 2015-16 | Champions League; Third place | Bronze match (F6) | (Italy) Pro Recco | 11–7 | | |
| 2016-17 | Champions League; Champion | Preliminary round (Group A) | (Greece) Olympiacos | 5-5 | 6-4 | 1st place |
| 2016-17 | Champions League; Champion | Preliminary round (Group A) | (Germany) Spandau 04 | 12-7 | 12-8 | 1st place |
| 2016-17 | Champions League; Champion | Preliminary round (Group A) | (France) Olympic Nice | 17-4 | 12-5 | 1st place |
| 2016-17 | Champions League; Champion | Preliminary round (Group A) | (Hungary) OSC | 10-8 | 9-8 | 1st place |
| 2016-17 | Champions League; Champion | Preliminary round (Group A) | (Italy) Brescia | 8-4 | 10-9 | 1st place |
| 2016-17 | Champions League; Champion | Semi-final (F6) | (Hungary) Eger | 7–5 | | |
| 2016-17 | Champions League; Champion | Final (F6) | (Croatia) Jug Dubrovnik | 10–5 | | |
| 2017-18 | Champions League; Fifth place | Preliminary round (Group B) | (Romania) Steaua București | 15-3 | 17-9 | 3rd place |
| 2017-18 | Champions League; Fifth place | Preliminary round (Group B) | (Hungary) Eger | 10-11 | 3-6 | 3rd place |
| 2017-18 | Champions League; Fifth place | Preliminary round (Group B) | (Spain) Sabadell | 14-4 | 16-5 | 3rd place |
| 2017-18 | Champions League; Fifth place | Preliminary round (Group B) | (Montenegro) Jadran Herceg Novi | 13-10 | 14-6 | 3rd place |
| 2017-18 | Champions League; Fifth place | Preliminary round (Group B) | (Netherlands) Alphen | 17-4 | 17-6 | 3rd place |
| 2017-18 | Champions League; Fifth place | Preliminary round (Group B) | (Italy) Pro Recco | 10-9 | 5-8 | 3rd place |
| 2017-18 | Champions League; Fifth place | Preliminary round (Group B) | (Germany) Spandau 04 | 9-8 | 9-10 | 3rd place |
| 2017-18 | Champions League; Fifth place | Quarter-final (F8) | (Croatia) Jug Dubrovnik | 8–9 | | |
| 2017-18 | Champions League; Fifth place | 5th-8th semifinal (F8) | (Italy) Brescia | 8–7 | | |
| 2017-18 | Champions League; Fifth place | 5th-6th placement (F6) | (Hungary) Eger | 10–6 | | |
| 2018-19 | Champions League | Preliminary round (Group B) | (Greece) Olympiacos | 9-9 | 10-11 | 4th place |
| 2018-19 | Champions League | Preliminary round (Group B) | (Croatia) Jug Dubrovnik | 10-7 | 7-8 | 4th place |
| 2018-19 | Champions League | Preliminary round (Group B) | (Germany) Spandau 04 | 14-6 | 9-9 | 4th place |
| 2018-19 | Champions League | Preliminary round (Group B) | (Germany) Waspo Hannover | 10-10 | 13-9 | 4th place |
| 2018-19 | Champions League | Preliminary round (Group B) | (Croatia) HAVK Mladost | 11-8 | 11-8 | 4th place |
| 2018-19 | Champions League | Preliminary round (Group B) | (Croatia) Jadran Split | 10-9 | 10-15 | 4th place |
| 2018-19 | Champions League | Preliminary round (Group B) | (Italy) Sport Management | 6-6 | 5-7 | 4th place |
| 2019-20 | Champions League | Preliminary round (Group A) | (Spain) Barceloneta | (canc.) | 10-14 | Cancelled |
| 2019-20 | Champions League | Preliminary round (Group A) | (Greece) Olympiacos | 7-8 | (canc.) | Cancelled |
| 2019-20 | Champions League | Preliminary round (Group A) | (Montenegro) Jadran Herceg Novi | (canc.) | 14-12 | Cancelled |
| 2019-20 | Champions League | Preliminary round (Group A) | (Croatia) Jadran Split | 5-4 | 14-10 | Cancelled |
| 2019-20 | Champions League | Preliminary round (Group A) | (Germany) Spandau 04 | 7-8 | 14-10 | Cancelled |
| 2019-20 | Champions League | Preliminary round (Group A) | (Croatia) Jug Dubrovnik | 12-16 | 11-14 | Cancelled |
| 2019-20 | Champions League | Preliminary round (Group A) | (Russia) Sintez Kazan | 13-10 | (canc.) | Cancelled |
| 2020-21 | Champions League | elimination in Qualifying round | | | | |
| 2020-21 | Euro Cup; Champion | Round of 16 | (Montenegro) Primorac Kotor | 17-16 | 18-8 | 35–24 |
| 2020-21 | Euro Cup; Champion | Quarter-finals | (Serbia) Radnički Kragujevac | 10-10 | 14-12 | 24–22 |
| 2020-21 | Euro Cup; Champion | Semi-finals | (Serbia) Crvena zvezda | 15-8 | 20-12 | 35–20 |
| 2020-21 | Euro Cup; Champion | Finals | (Hungary) Orvosegyetem SC | 14-11 | 8-11 | 22–22 (3–0 p) |
| 2021-22 | Champions League | elimination in Third qualifying round | | | | |
| 2021-22 | Euro Cup | Quarter-finals | (Italy) Ortigia | 10-15 | 4-9 | 14–24 |
| 2022-23 | Euro Cup | Round of 16 | (Hungary) Bp. Honvéd | 8-5 | 11-13 | 19–18 |
| 2022-23 | Euro Cup | Quarter-finals | (Italy) Trieste | 12-13 | 10-11 | 22–24 |

== Notable former players ==
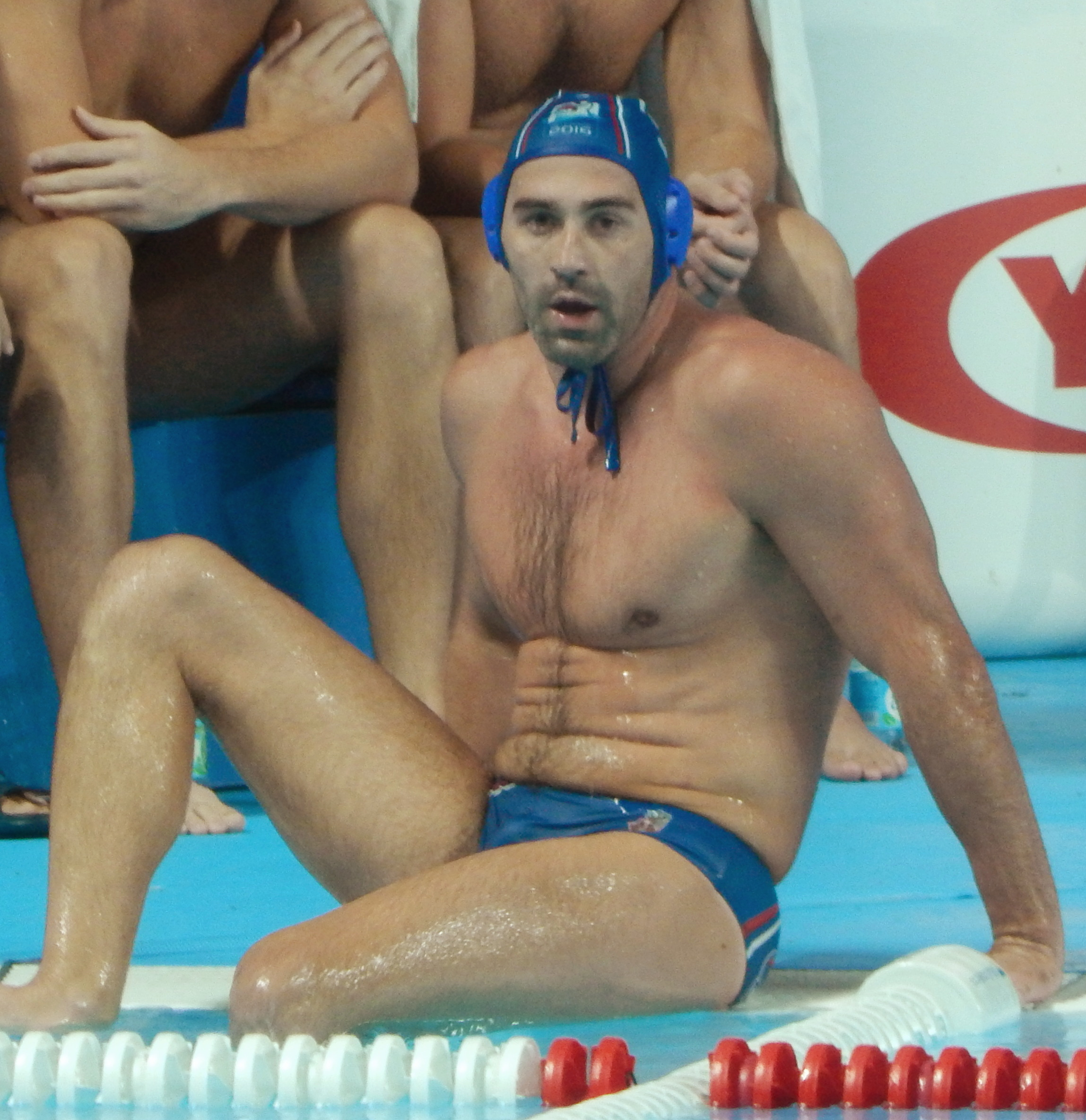
Živko Gocić

=== Olympic champions ===
- (Hungary) Ottó Boros (1948–1950, 1952–1964)
- (Hungary) Tibor Cservenyák (1958–1972)
- (Hungary) István Hasznos (1934–1943, 1947–1961)
- (Hungary) Norbert Hosnyánszky (2014–2016)
- (Hungary) Tivadar Kanizsa (1954–1964)
- (Hungary) Gábor Kis (2011–2019)
- (Hungary) Norbert Madaras (2014–2016)
- (Hungary) Dániel Varga (2014–2016)
- (Hungary) Dénes Varga (2014–2017)
- (Hungary) Tamás Varga (junior years)
- (Serbia) Milan Aleksić (2012–2019)
- (Serbia) Miloš Ćuk (2017–2018)
- (Serbia) Filip Filipović (2020–2021)
- (Serbia) (Hungary) Živko Gocić (2011–2018)
- (Serbia) Stefan Mitrović (2013–2016)
- (Serbia) Duško Pijetlović (2019–2021)
- (Serbia) Andrija Prlainović (2016–2019)

== Former coaches ==
- (Hungary) József Vértesy
- (Hungary) Miklós Czapkó ( –1965)
- (Hungary) Tivadar Kanizsa (1966–75)
- (Hungary) Mihály Mayer (1987–90)
- (Hungary) Péter Wolf (1993–94)
- (Hungary) Zoltán Mohi (1999–00)
- (Hungary) Lajos Urbán (2001–03)
- (Hungary) Dénes Lukács (2003– )
- (Hungary) Sándor Cseh ( –2012)
- (Hungary) István Kovács (2012–14)
- (Hungary) Sándor Cseh (2014–18) 2x
- (Serbia) (Hungary) Živko Gocić (2018– present)
