= Aaron Younger =

Australian water polo player (born 1991)

Personal information
- Full name: Aaron Younger
- Nationality: Australian
- Born: 25 September 1991 (age 35) Attadale, Western Australia
- Height: 6 ft (1.8 m)

Sport
- Sport: Water polo
National team
- Years: Team
- –: Australia

Aaron Younger (born 25 September 1991) is an Australian professional water polo player.

He was born in Attadale, Western Australia and is 6 feet 4 inches (193 cm) tall. He made his debut for the Australian national team in 2009, that year, he was also part of the Australian Universities team that won the World University Games. In 2010, he signed for the Hungarian team Szeged.

At the 2012 Summer Olympics, he competed for the Australia men's national water polo team in the men's event - he was the youngest player on the team. He also competed at the 2016 Summer Olympics, scoring seven goals in five games. In 2015, he signed for another Hungarian team, Szolnok, before moving to Ferencváros in 2018. At the 2018 FINA Men's Water Polo World Cup, Aaron Younger was nominated best player of the tournament.

Younger was picked to captain the Australian team in the men's water polo tournament at the 2020 Summer Olympics. The team finished joint fourth on points in their pool but their inferior goal average meant they finished fifth overall and out of medal contention. They were able to upset Croatia in a group stage match 11–8.

He currently plays for Italian club Pro Recco. He has also represented Australia at five World Championships. Original, he focussed on swimming but switched to water polo at the age of 10. He has a Bachelor of Commerce from Curtin University and an MBA from the University of New South Wales.

In the summer of 2023, he joined Maltese team San Giljan ASC to take part in the Maltese Waterpolo Summer League alongside Croatia star Maro Jokovic

== Honours ==
=== Club ===
Szolnok

- LEN Champions League winner: 2016–17
- LEN Super Cup winner: 2017
- Hungarian Championship winner: 2015–16, 2016–17
- Hungarian Cup winner: 2016–17, 2017–18
- Hungarian Super Cup winner: 2017

Ferencvaros

- LEN Champions League winner: 2018–19
- LEN Super Cup winner: 2018, 2019
- Hungarian Championship: 2018–19
- Hungarian Cup: 2018–19, 2019–20
- Hungarian Super Cup: 2018

Pro Recco

- LEN Champions League winner: 2020–21, 2021-2022, 2022-23, 2021–22
- LEN Super Cup winner: 2021, 2022 and 2023
- Serie A winner: 2021–22, 2022-23, 2023-24, 2024-25
- Coppa Italia winner: 2020–21, 2021–22, 2022-23, 2024-25
- LEN Cup winner: 2024-25

=== Australian Team ===
- World Cup Silver (c)2018
- World League Bronze (c) 2018

== Awards ==
- 2015 World Championship Team of the Tournament
- World Cup MVP: 2018 Berlin
- LEN Champions League Defender of the Year: 2023–24
- LEN Champions League First and only player to ever win 4 consecutive champions league trophies (5 total)
- LEN Champions League First and only player to ever win 6 LEN super cup trophies in a row
