= 2009–10 Országos Bajnokság I (men's water polo) =

Water polo league season

OB I
- Season: 2009–10
- Champions: Vasas (17th title)
- Euroleague: TEVA-VasasPlaket; ZF-Eger; Szeged Beton
- LEN Cup: FTC-Fisher Klíma; Domino Honvéd
- Top goalscorer: dr. Tamás Molnár (69 goals)

2009–10 Országos Bajnokság I (men's water polo) (known as the Vodafone férfi OB I osztályú Országos Bajnokság for sponsorship reasons) was the 104th water polo championship in Hungary.

== First stage ==
#	Team	M	Gy	D	V	G+	G−	P
1.	ZF-Egri VK	20	17	1	2	221	141	52
2.	TEVA-Vasas SC-Plaket	20	16	1	3	273	126	49
3.	Szeged-Beton VE	20	14	3	3	204	139	45
4.	Ferencvárosi TC	20	13	1	6	182	155	40
5.	Domino-Bp. Honvéd	20	12	2	6	199	145	38
6.	Szolnoki Főiskola VSC-Közgép	20	9	4	7	179	161	31
7.	BVSC-Zugló	20	7	1	12	161	219	22
8.	Uniqa-Újpesti TE	20	5	1	14	131	202	16
9.	Pécsi Vízmű-Pécsi VSK	20	3	3	14	157	222	12
10.	OSC	20	3	2	15	147	233	11
11.	Szentesi VK	20	1	1	18	125	236	4

Championship Playoff
European competition Playoff
Relegation Playoff

Pld - Played; W - Won; L - Lost; G+ - Points for; G− - Points against; Diff - Difference; P - Points.

== Championship Playoff ==
Semifinals
1	ZF-Eger	11	5	8
4	FTC-Fisher Klíma	6	7	5
2	TEVA-VasasPlaket	7	10	15
3	Szeged Beton	5	3	13

Final
1	ZF-Eger	12 (p)	2	6	12	9
2	TEVA-VasasPlaket	11	6	7	11	10
Third place
3	Szeged Beton	6	11	7
4	FTC-Fisher Klíma	4	12	5

== European competition Playoff ==
#	Team	M	W	D	L	G+	G−	P	BP
5.	Domino-Bp. Honvéd	6	6	0	0	68	37	30	18
6.	Szolnoki Főiskola VSC-Közgép	6	3	2	1	51	38	19	11
7.	BVSC-Zugló	6	1	1	4	47	62	10	4
8.	Uniqa-Újpesti TE	6	1	0	5	46	75	6	3

LEN Cup qualification

Pld - Played; W - Won; L - Lost; G+ - Points for; G− - Points against; Diff - Difference; P - Points; BP - Bonus Points.

== Relegation Playoff ==
#	Team	M	W	D	L	G+	G−	P	BP
9.	Pécsi Vízmű-Pécsi VSK	4	2	1	1	43	37	19	7
10.	OSC	4	2	2	0	41	31	17	8
11.	Szentesi VK	4	0	1	3	31	47	7	1

Relegation

Pld - Played; W - Won; L - Lost; G+ - Points for; G− - Points against; Diff - Difference; P - Points; Bp - Bonus Points.

== Final standing ==
Qualified for the 2010–11 LEN Euroleague
Qualified for the 2010–11 LEN Cup

Rank	Team
1st place, gold medalist(s)	TEVA-VasasPlaket
2nd place, silver medalist(s)	ZF-Eger
3rd place, bronze medalist(s)	Szeged-Beton VE
4	Ferencvárosi TC
5	Domino-Honvéd
6	Szolnoki Főiskola VSC-Közgép
7	BVSC-Zugló
8	Uniqa-Újpesti TE
9	Pécsi Vízmű-Pécsi VSK
10	OSC-Opus Via
11	Szentesi VK

2009–10 OB I Champions
TEVA-VasasPlaket
17th Title

1 Viktor Nagy, 2 Ádám Decker, 3 Bence Fülöp, 4 Gergely Katonás
5 Norbert Hosnyánszky, 6 Viktor Vörös, 7 Róbert Kovács Csatlós, 8 Krisztián Létay
9 Dénes Varga, 10 Dániel Varga, 11 Gábor Kis
12 Bálint Takács, 13 Dávid Hőna, 14 György Jónás
Head coach
László Földi

== Sources ==
- Magyar sportévkönyv 2011
