= 2006–07 Országos Bajnokság I (men's water polo) =

Water polo league season in Hungary

OB I
- Season: 2006–07
- Champions: Vasas
- Euroleague: Vasas; Honvéd; Eger
- LEN Cup: Szeged; Pécsi VSK

2006–07 Országos Bajnokság I (men's water polo) was the 101st water polo championship in Hungary.

== First stage ==
#	Team	M	W	D	L	G+	G−	P	Comments
1.	Domino-Bp. Honvéd	22	20	1	1	368	196	41	
2.	TEVA-Vasas SC-Plaket	22	18	3	1	316	148	39	
3.	Szeged-Beton VE	22	17	1	4	243	145	35	
4.	Brendon-Fenstherm-ZF-Egri VK	22	16	2	4	280	161	34	
5.	Pécsi VSK-Fűszért	22	11	1	10	225	208	23	
6.	Ferencvárosi TC-Aprilia	22	10	2	10	230	215	22	
7.	BVSC	22	10	1	11	226	263	21	
8.	Újpesti TE-Óbuda-Újlak	22	9	3	10	210	217	21	
9.	Szolnoki Főiskola VSC	22	5	1	16	183	264	10	deducted 1 point
10.	OSC-Opus Via	22	4	1	17	175	265	9	
11.	Legrand-Szentesi VK	22	4	0	18	142	268	8	
12.	Neptun VSC	22	0	0	22	152	390	0	

Championship Playoff
European competition Playoff
Relegation Playoff

Pld - Played; W - Won; L - Lost; PF - Points for; PA - Points against; Diff - Difference; Pts - Points.

== Championship Playoff ==
Semifinals
1	Domino-Bp. Honvéd	12	8	18
4	Brendon-Fenstherm-ZF-Egri VK	11	9	9
2	TEVA-Vasas SC-Plaket	8	6	13	5
3	Szeged-Beton VE	6	7	5	3

Final
1	Domino-Bp. Honvéd	6	8	12	9
2	TEVA-Vasas SC-Plaket	7	11	6	10
Third place
4	Brendon-Fenstherm-ZF-Egri VK	11	10	-	-
3	Szeged-Beton VE	8	7	-	-

== European competition Playoff ==
Placement Semifinals								Fifth place
5	Pécsi VSK-Fűszért	11	10	14	11	5	8
8	Újpesti TE-Óbuda-Újlak	10	11	13	7	7	6	5	Pécsi VSK-Fűszért	8	11	-	-	-	-
6	Ferencvárosi TC-Aprilia	8	6	9				6	Ferencvárosi TC-Aprilia	7	10	-	-	-	-
7	BVSC	6	7	8

=== Seventh place ===
Team 1	Agg.	Team 2	1st leg	2nd leg
BVSC	16–20	Újpesti TE-Óbuda-Újlak	11–12	5–8

== Relegation Playoff ==
Placement Semifinals
9	Szolnoki Főiskola VSC	22	15
12	Neptun VSC	9	8
10	OSC-Opus Via	11	9	13	5	8
11	Legrand-Szentesi VK	8	10	12	9	5

Ninth place
9	Szolnoki Főiskola VSC	11	14	-	-
10	OSC-Opus Via	9	13	-	-
Relegation play-offs
12	Neptun VSC	5	9	-	-
11	Legrand-Szentesi VK	17	15	-	-

== Final standing ==
Qualified for the 2007–08 LEN Euroleague
Qualified for the 2007–08 LEN Cup
Relegation to the 2007–08 OB I/B

Rank	Team
1st place, gold medalist(s)	TEVA-VasasPlaket
2nd place, silver medalist(s)	Domino-BHSE
3rd place, bronze medalist(s)	Brendon-Fenstherm-ZF-Eger
4	Szeged-Beton VE
5	Pécsi VSK-Fűszért
6	Ferencvárosi TC-Aprilia
7	Újpesti TE-Óbuda-Újlak
8	BVSC
9	Szolnoki Főiskola VSC
10	OSC-Opus Via
11	Legrand-Szentesi VK
12	Neptun VSC

2006–07 OB I Champions
TEVA-VasasPlaket
14th Title

1 Viktor Nagy, 2 Norbert Hosnyánszky, 3 Attila Kincses, 4 Zoltán Kelemen
5 Zoltán Mátyás, 6 Dávid Heinrich, 7 Róbert Kovács Csatlós, 8 Márton Tóth
9 Dénes Varga, 10 Dániel Varga, 11 Barnabás Steinmetz
12 Ádám Steinmetz, 13 Tamás Kuncz, 14 György Jónás
Head coach
László Földi

== Sources ==
- Magyar sportévkönyv 2008
