= Zoltán Mohi =

Hungarian water polo player

Personal information
- Nationality: Hungarian
- Born: 6 June 1967 (age 57); Szolnok, Hungary

Sport
- Sport: Water polo

Zoltán Mohi (born 6 June 1967) is a Hungarian water polo player. He competed in the men's tournament at the 1988 Summer Olympics.
