= Živko Gocić =

Serbian water polo player

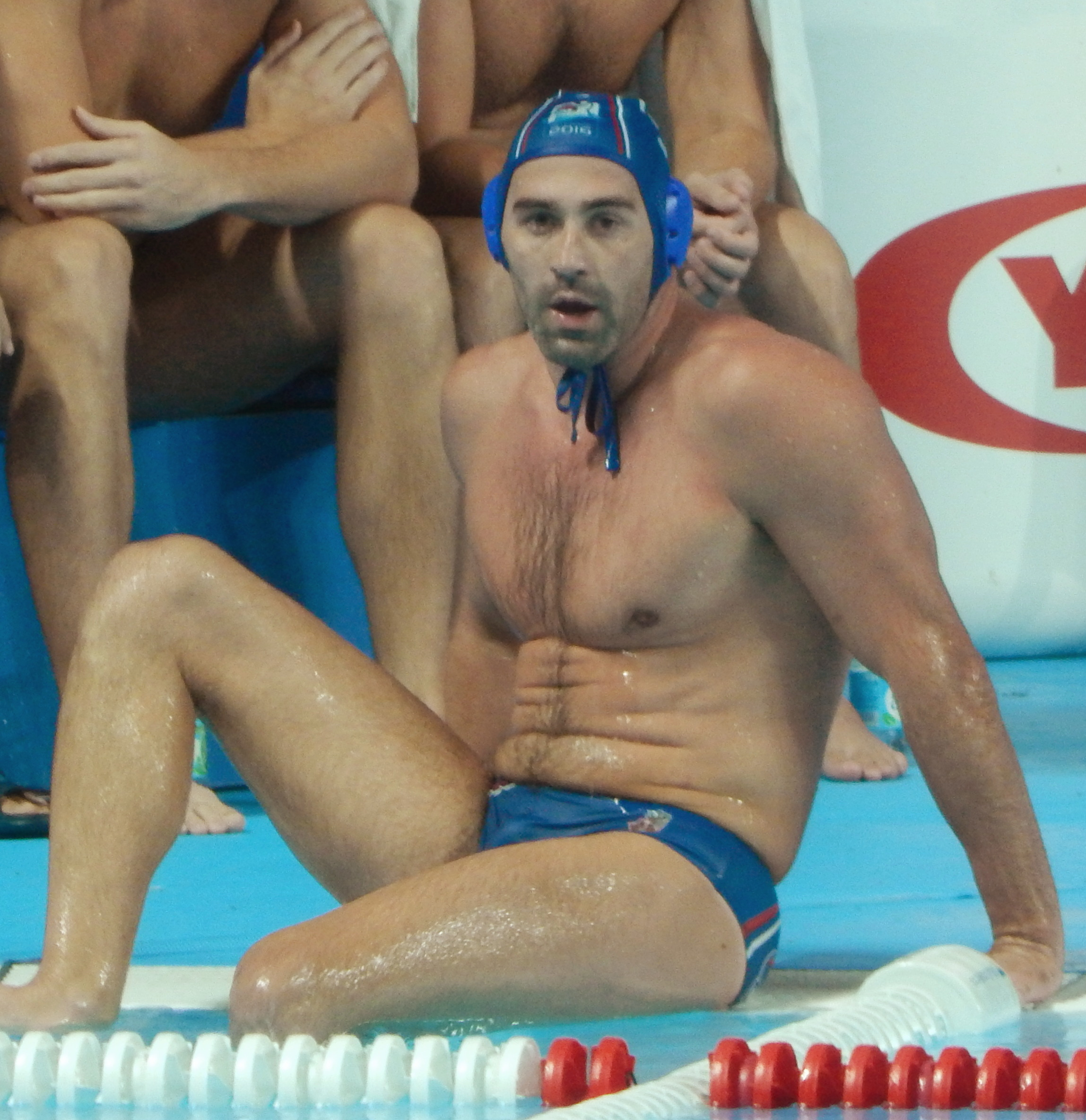
- Gocić at the 2015 World Championships

Personal information
- Nickname: Žile
- Nationality: Serbian
- Born: 22 August 1982 (age 44) Belgrade, SR Serbia, SFR Yugoslavia
- Height: 1.93 m (6 ft 4 in)
- Weight: 107 kg (236 lb)

Sport
- Sport: Water polo
- Handedness: Right
- Position: Guard

Youth career
- Years: Team
- 1990–1998: Partizan

Senior clubs
- Years: Team
- 1998–2003: Partizan
- 2003–2004: Nais
- 2004–2005: Ortigia
- 2005–2007: Dynamo Moscow
- 2007–2010: Partizan
- 2010–2011: Latina
- 2011–2018: Szolnok
National team
Years	Team	Apps	(Gls)
2003–2006	Serbia and Montenegro	?	(?)
2006–2016	Serbia	332	(193)

Teams coached
- 2018–2022: Szolnok
- 2022–2025: Novi Beograd
- 2025–present: Partizan (consultant)
Medal record
Men's water polo
Representing Serbia
Olympic Games
Gold medal – first place	2016 Rio de Janeiro	Team
Bronze medal – third place	2008 Beijing	Team
Bronze medal – third place	2012 London	Team
World Championship
Gold medal – first place	2009 Rome
Gold medal – first place	2015 Kazan
Silver medal – second place	2011 Shanghai
European Championship
Gold medal – first place	2003 Kranj
Gold medal – first place	2006 Belgrade
Gold medal – first place	2012 Eindhoven
Gold medal – first place	2014 Budapest
Gold medal – first place	2016 Belgrade
Bronze medal – third place	2010 Zagreb
FINA World League
Gold medal – first place	2005 Belgrade
Gold medal – first place	2006 Athens
Gold medal – first place	2007 Berlin
Gold medal – first place	2008 Genoa
Gold medal – first place	2010 Niš
Gold medal – first place	2011 Firenze
Gold medal – first place	2013 Chelyabinsk
Gold medal – first place	2014 Dubai
Gold medal – first place	2015 Bergamo
Gold medal – first place	2016 Huizhou
Bronze medal – third place	2009 Podgorica
FINA World Cup
Gold medal – first place	2006 Budapest
Gold medal – first place	2010 Oradea
Mediterranean Games
Gold medal – first place	2009 Pescara

Živko Gocić (Serbian Cyrillic: Живко Гоцић; born 22 August 1982) is a former Serbian water polo player. He was a member of the Serbian teams that won bronze medals at the 2008 and 2012 Olympics and a gold medal in 2016. He also held the world title in 2009 and 2015 and the European title in 2003, 2006, 2012, 2014 and 2016. In December 2013 he became captain of the national team.

== Club career ==
=== Szolnoki Dózsa-KÖZGÉP ===
On 27 September 2011, Gocić scored a goal in the first round of the Vodafone OB-1, in the 9–7 away win against Szentesi VK. Gocić scored his second goal of the Vodafone OB-1 season in the third round easy 12–5 away win against Orvosegyetem SC. Gocić scored his third goal of the Vodafone OB-1 season in the fourth round 10–9 away win against BVSC- Zugló. Gocić scored his fourth goal in the 10–9 Vodafone OB-1 fifth round home defeat to ZF-Eger. Gocić scored his fifth goal of the Vodafone OB-1 season in the sixth round 16–7 easy away win against FTC Fisher Klíma. Gocić scored his sixth goal of the Vodafone OB-1 season in the eight round 13–6 away win against Groupama Honvéd. Gocić scored his seventh goal of the Vodafone OB-1 season in the 7–6 ninth round home defeat to TEVA-VasasUNIQA. Živko Gocić scored two goals in the 9–4 Vodafone OB-1 home win against Debrecen Fujitsu.

== National career ==
Gocić scored his first goal at the European Championship on 17 January against Germany in a second game which the Serbs won by 13–12. On 19 January, in a third game of the tournament, he scored his second goal in a difficult 15–12 victory against the defending European champions Croatia. On 21 January in the fourth match, Gocić scored his third goal of the tournament for his national team in a routine victory against Romania 14–5. On 23 January, in the last round of group A, which Serbia lost to Montenegro with 11–7, Gocić scored two goals. On 29 January, Gocić won the European Championship with his national team beating in the final Montenegro by 9–8.

== Honours ==
=== Player ===
Partizan

- FR Yugoslav League: 2001–02
- FR Yugoslav Cup: 2001–02
- Serbian League: 2007–08, 2008–09, 2009–10
- Serbian Cup: 2007–08, 2008–09, 2009–10
- Euro Interliga: 2009–10

Szolnok

- Champions League: 2016–17
- European Super Cup: 2017
- Hungarian League: 2014–15, 2015–16, 2016–17
- Hungarian Cup: 2013–14, 2015–16, 2016–17

=== Manager ===
Szolnok

- Euro Cup: 2020–21
- Hungarian League: 2020–21

Novi Beograd

- Serbian League: 2022–23, 2023–24
- Serbian Cup: 2023–24, 2024–25
- Regional League: 2023–24

== See also ==
- Serbia men's Olympic water polo team records and statistics
- List of Olympic champions in men's water polo
- List of Olympic medalists in water polo (men)
- List of world champions in men's water polo
- List of World Aquatics Championships medalists in water polo

Sporting positions
Preceded by Vanja Udovičić	Serbia captain 2013–2016	Succeeded by Filip Filipović
