= István Hasznos =

Hungarian water polo player

Personal information
- Born: December 8, 1924 Szolnok, Hungary
- Died: May 7, 1998 (aged 73) Szolnok, Hungary

Sport
- Sport: Water polo
Medal record
Representing Hungary
Olympic Games
Gold medal – first place	1952 Helsinki	Team competition

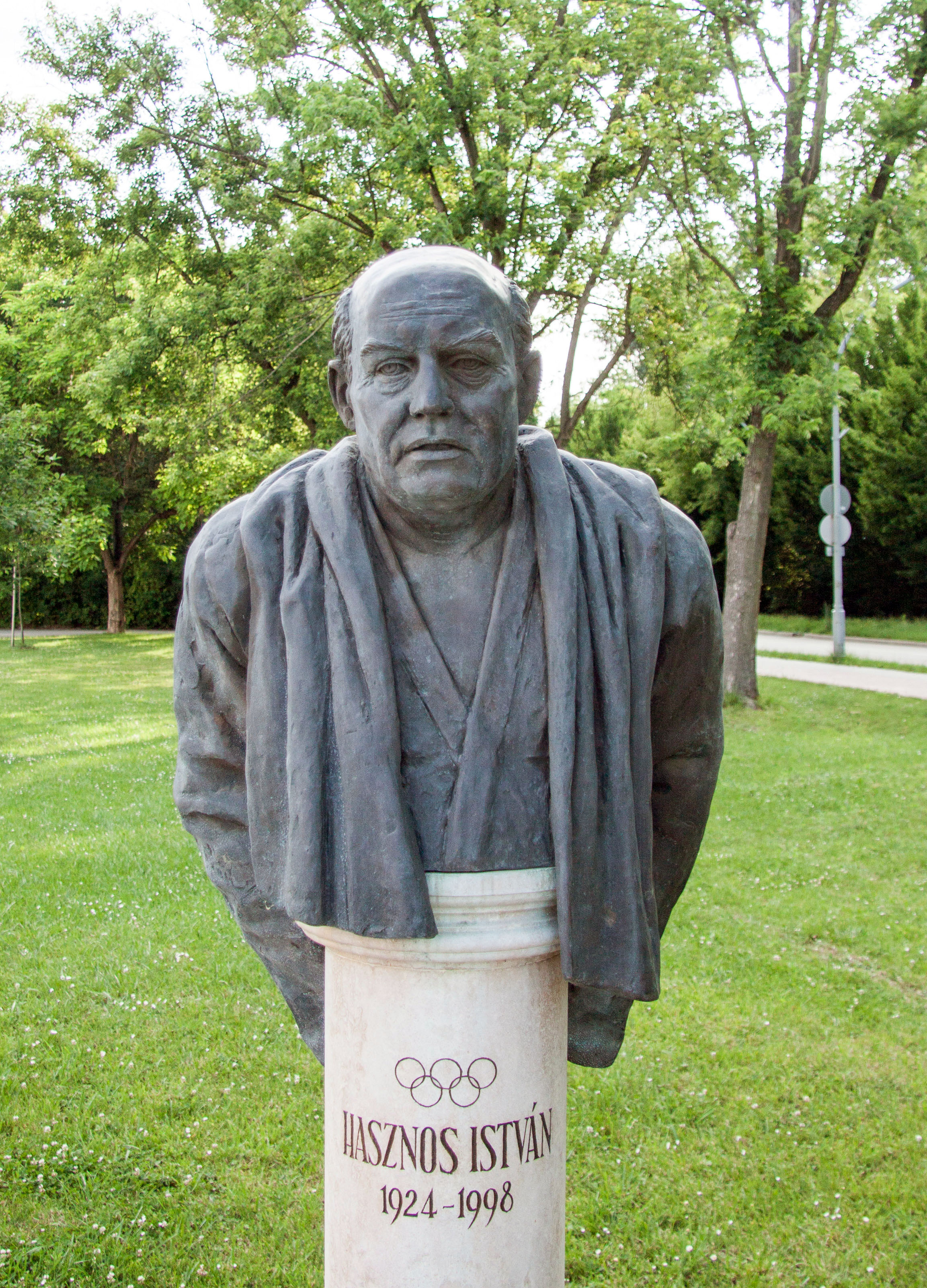
Bust of Istaván Hasznos.

István Hasznos (8 December 1924 – 7 May 1998) was a Hungarian water polo player who competed in the 1952 Summer Olympics.

Hasznos was part of the Hungarian team which won the gold medal in the 1952 tournament. He played two matches and scored seven goals.

== See also ==
- Hungary men's Olympic water polo team records and statistics
- List of Olympic champions in men's water polo
- List of Olympic medalists in water polo (men)
