= Milan Aleksić =

Serbian water polo player

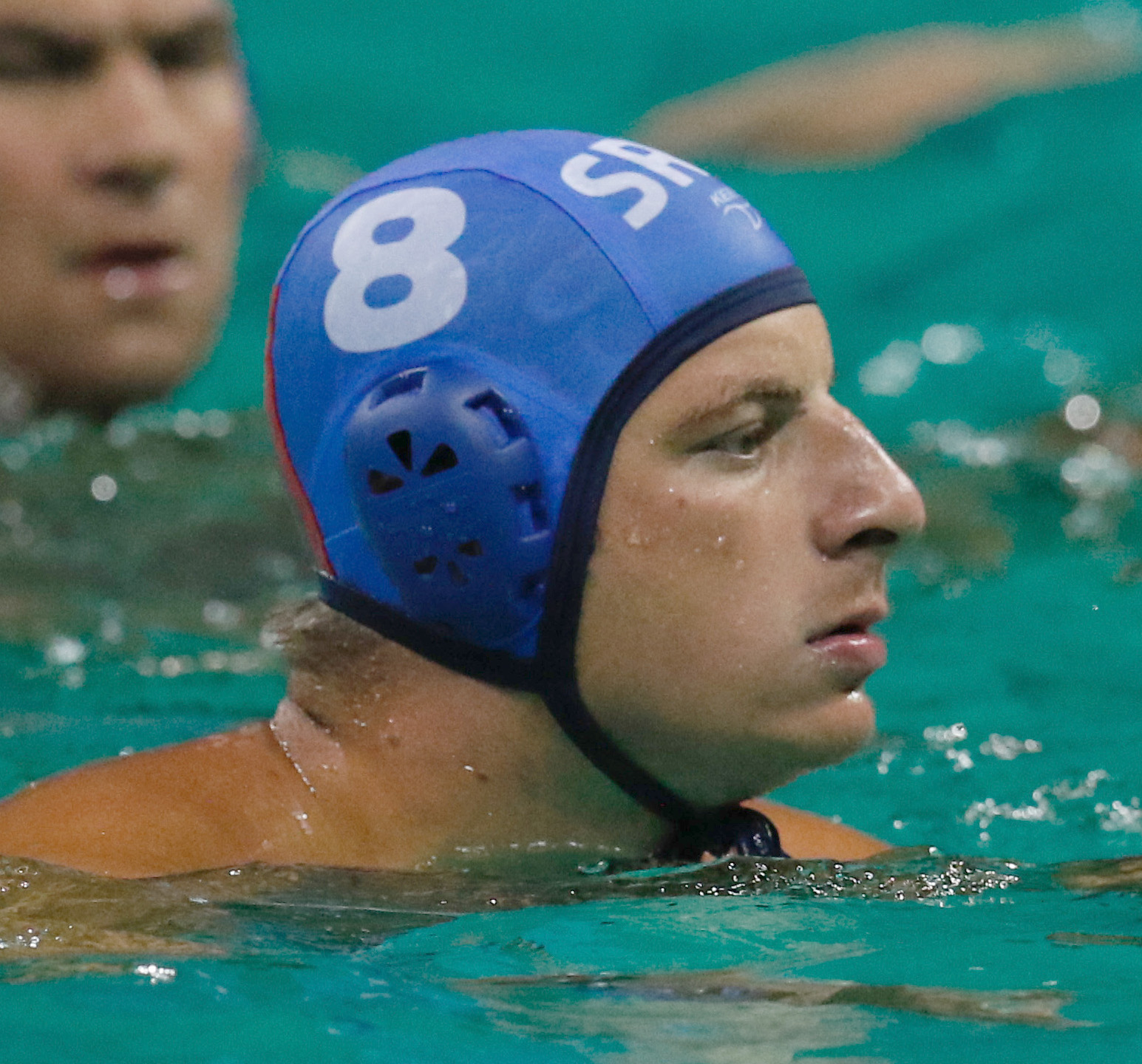
- Aleksić at the 2016 Summer Olympics

Personal information
- Nationality: Serbian
- Born: 13 May 1986 (age 40) Belgrade, SR Serbia, SFR Yugoslavia
- Height: 1.93 m (6 ft 4 in)
- Weight: 96 kg (212 lb)

Sport
- Sport: Water polo
- Position: Center Back
- Current club: Partizan

Senior clubs
- Years: Team
- 2003–2012: Partizan
- 2012–2019: Szolnoki
- 2019–2021: Barceloneta
- 2021–: Partizan
Medal record
Men's water polo
Representing Serbia
Olympic Games
Gold medal – first place	2016 Rio de Janeiro	Team
Gold medal – first place	2020 Tokyo	Team
Bronze medal – third place	2012 London	Team
World Championship
Gold medal – first place	2009 Rome	Team
Gold medal – first place	2015 Kazan	Team
Silver medal – second place	2011 Shanghai	Team
Bronze medal – third place	2017 Budapest	Team
European Championship
Gold medal – first place	2012 Eindhoven
Gold medal – first place	2014 Budapest
Gold medal – first place	2016 Belgrade
Gold medal – first place	2018 Barcelona
Bronze medal – third place	2010 Zagreb
FINA World Cup
Gold medal – first place	2010 Oradea
FINA World League
Gold medal – first place	2007 Berlin
Gold medal – first place	2010 Niš
Gold medal – first place	2011 Firenze
Gold medal – first place	2013 Chelyabinsk
Gold medal – first place	2015 Bergamo
Gold medal – first place	2016 Huizhou
Gold medal – first place	2017 Ruza
Gold medal – first place	2019 Belgrade
Bronze medal – third place	2009 Podgorica
Mediterranean Games
Gold medal – first place	2009 Pescara
Gold medal – first place	2018 Tarragona
Representing Serbia and Montenegro
Universiade
Gold medal – first place	2005 İzmir

Milan Aleksić (Serbian Cyrillic: Милан Алексић; born 13 May 1986) is a Serbian water polo center back who plays for Partizan and the Serbia men's national water polo team. He is a 2016 and 2020 Olympic champion and a 2012 Olympic bronze medalist. He also held the world title in 2009 and 2015 and European title in 2012, 2014 and 2016. His most notable achievements in a club competition are the LEN Euroleague and the LEN Supercup which he won in 2011 with Partizan Raiffeisen.

== Club career ==
=== Partizan Raiffeisen ===
On 22 October 2011 Aleksić scored a goal in the first round of the Euroleague Group, in an 8–9 loss to Szeged Beton VE. On 9 November Aleksić scored his second goal of the tournament in the second round of the Euroleague Group in the 10–10 tie against TEVA-Vasas-UNIQA. On 26 November Aleksić scored his third goal of the tournament in a 9–6 Euroleague third round win over ZF Eger in Belgrade. Aleksić scored two goals on 14 December in the fourth round of the Euroleague, in the 12–8 second defeat to ZF Eger. On 8 February Milan Aleksić scored two goals for Partizan in the fifth round of the Euroleague Group in which his team won without much problem 9–5 against TEVA-Vasas-UNIQA. On 26 February Aleksić scored his last goal in the final round of the Euroleague Group, in which his team lost by 9–8 to Szeged Beton VE and dropped out of the competition. On 1 March he scored a goal against VK Vojvodina in a 10–9 win in the "A League" fourth round.

== National career ==
Aleksić scored his first goal at the European Championship on 17 January 2012 against Germany in Serbia's second game which the Serbs won by 13–12. On 19 January 2012, in their third game of the tournament, Aleksić scored his second goal in a difficult 15–12 victory against the defending European champions, Croatia.

100th match for the Serbia national team

On 23 January, Aleksić played his 100th official match for his national team in the last round of group A scoring a goal, in which Serbia lost to Montenegro with 11–7.

On 27 January Aleksić scored two goals in a semifinal 12–8 victory over Italy. Milan Aleksić won the 2012 European Championship with Serbia on 29 January. He scored a goal in the final against Montenegro which his national team won by 9–8. This was his first gold medal at the European Championships.

At the 2012 Summer Olympics, Aleksić was part of the Serbian team that won the bronze medal.

At the 2016 Summer Olympics, Aleksić was part of the Serbian team that won the gold medal.

At the 2020 Summer Olympics, Aleksić was part of the Serbian team that won the gold medal.

== Honours ==
=== Club ===
VK Partizan

- LEN Champions League: 2010–11
- Serbian Championship: 2006–07, 2007–08, 2008–09, 2009–10, 2010–11
- Serbian Cup: 2006–07, 2007–08, 2008–09, 2009–10, 2010–11, 2011–12
- LEN Super Cup: 2011
- Eurointer League : 2010, 2011

Szolnok

- LEN Champions League: 2016–17
- LEN Super Cup: 2017
- Hungarian Championship: 2014–15, 2015–16, 2016–17
- Hungarian Cup: 2014, 2016, 2017
- Hungarian Super Cup: 2016, 2017

CN Atlètic-Barceloneta

- Spanish Championship: 2019–20, 2020–21
- Copa del Rey: 2019–20, 2020–21

== See also ==
- Serbia men's Olympic water polo team records and statistics
- List of Olympic champions in men's water polo
- List of Olympic medalists in water polo (men)
- List of world champions in men's water polo
- List of World Aquatics Championships medalists in water polo
