= 2020–21 LEN Euro Cup =

- League: LEN Euro Cup
- Sport: Water Polo
- Duration: 13 November 2020 – 8 May 2021
- Number of teams: 30 (from 13 countries)
- Finals champions: (Hungary) Szolnok (1st title)
- Runners-up: (Hungary) OSC Budapest

Euro Cup seasons
- ← 2019–20 2021–22 →

The 2020–21 LEN Euro Cup was the 29th edition of the second-tier European tournament for men's water polo clubs.

== Teams ==
The labels in the parentheses show how each team qualified for the place of its starting round: The labels in the parentheses show how each team qualified for the place of its starting round:

- CL: Transferred from the LEN Champions League
  - Q: Losers from the qualifying round

Qualification round
(France) Pays d’Aix Natation (CL Q)	(Spain) CN Barcelona (CL Q)	(Serbia) Novi Beograd	(Russia) Sintez Kazan (CL Q)
(France) Tourcoing (CL Q)	(Spain) CN Terrassa (CL Q)	(Serbia) Crvena zvezda	(Russia) Dynamo Moscow
(France) Noisy-le-Sec	(Spain) CN Sabadell	(Croatia) Mladost Zagreb (CL Q)	(Italy) RN Savona
(France) Strasbourg	(Spain) CE Mediterrani	(Croatia) Jadran Split (CL Q)	(Montenegro) Primorac Kotor (CL Q)
(Hungary) OSC Budapest (CL Q)	(Greece) Vouliagmeni (CL Q)	(Germany) OSC Potsdam	(Slovenia) Triglav Kranj
(Hungary) Szolnok (CL Q)	(Greece) Apollon Smyrni	(Germany) SV Ludwigsburg	(Switzerland) Carouge Natation
(Hungary) ZF Eger	(Greece) Panionios	(Romania) Steaua Bucharest (CL Q)	
(Hungary) BVSC-Zugló	(Serbia) Radnički Kragujevac (CL Q)	(Romania) Digi Oradea (CL Q)	

== Schedule ==
The schedule of the competition is as follows.

Phase	Round	First leg	Second leg
Qualifying	Qualification round I	13–15 November 2020	
Qualifying	Qualification round II	4–6 December 2020	
Knockout phase	Eight-finals	27 February 2021	6 March 2021
Knockout phase	Quarterfinals	17 March 2021	24 March 2021
Knockout phase	Semifinals	3 April 2021	10 April 2021
Knockout phase	Final	24 April 2021	8 May 2021

== Qualification round ==
The qualification round is scheduled for 4–6 December 2020.

=== Group A ===
Pos	Team	Pld	W	D	L	GF	GA	GD	Pts	Qualification	(France) ENT	(Spain) CNB	(Greece) PAN	(Hungary) ZUG
1	(France) Tourcoing	3	2	1	0	42	21	+21	7	Knockout phase	—	—	20–9	10–0
2	(Spain) CN Barcelona (H)	3	2	1	0	37	17	+20	7	Knockout phase	12–12	—	15–5	10–0
3	(Greece) Panionios	3	1	0	2	24	35	−11	3		—	—	—	—
4	(Hungary) BVSC-Zugló	3	0	0	3	0	30	−30	0	Disqualified	—	—	0–10	—

Source: LEN
(H) Hosts

=== Group B ===
Pos	Team	Pld	W	D	L	GF	GA	GD	Pts	Qualification	(Spain) CNS	(Russia) DYN	(Croatia) JST	(Romania) STE
1	(Spain) CN Sabadell (H)	3	3	0	0	32	24	+8	9	Knockout phase	—	12–7	9–8	11–9
2	(Russia) Dynamo Moscow	3	2	0	1	28	31	−3	6	Knockout phase	—	—	—	9–8
3	(Croatia) Jadran Split	3	1	0	2	33	32	+1	3		—	11–12	—	—
4	(Romania) Steaua Bucharest	3	0	0	3	28	34	−6	0		—	—	11–14	—

Source: LEN
(H) Hosts

=== Group C ===
Pos	Team	Pld	W	D	L	GF	GA	GD	Pts	Qualification	(Hungary) OSC	(Serbia) CZB	(France) NLS	(Slovenia) TRI
1	(Hungary) OSC Budapest	3	3	0	0	50	17	+33	9	Knockout phase	—	15–5	—	21–5
2	(Serbia) Crvena zvezda	3	2	0	1	37	34	+3	6	Knockout phase	—	—	13–12	19–7
3	(France) Noisy-le-Sec	3	1	0	2	39	36	+3	3		7–14	—	—	20–9
4	(Slovenia) Triglav Kranj (H)	3	0	0	3	21	60	−39	0		—	—	—	—

Source: LEN
(H) Hosts

=== Group D ===
Pos	Team	Pld	W	D	L	GF	GA	GD	Pts	Qualification	(Greece) NCV	(France) AIX	(Germany) LUD	(Switzerland) CAR
1	(Greece) Vouliagmeni	3	3	0	0	54	22	+32	9	Knockout phase	—	—	21–6	—
2	(France) Pays d’Aix Natation (H)	3	2	0	1	41	21	+20	6	Knockout phase	11–12	—	14–5	16–4
3	(Germany) SV Ludwigsburg	3	1	0	2	28	41	−13	3		—	—	—	—
4	(Switzerland) Carouge Natation	3	0	0	3	15	54	−39	0		5–21	—	6–17	—

Source: LEN
(H) Hosts

=== Group E ===
Pos	Team	Pld	W	D	L	GF	GA	GD	Pts	Qualification	(Serbia) RKG	(Spain) CEM	(Italy) RNS	(Germany) POT
1	(Serbia) Radnički Kragujevac	3	3	0	0	42	23	+19	9	Knockout phase	—	—	—	15–7
2	(Spain) CE Mediterrani	3	2	0	1	35	31	+4	6	Knockout phase	9–13	—	—	—
3	(Italy) RN Savona (H)	3	1	0	2	30	34	−4	3		7–14	11–12	—	12–8
4	(Germany) OSC Potsdam	3	0	0	3	22	41	−19	0		—	7–14		—

Source: LEN
(H) Hosts

=== Group F ===
Pos	Team	Pld	W	D	L	GF	GA	GD	Pts	Qualification	(Croatia) MZG	(Montenegro) PRI	(Hungary) ZFE
1	(Croatia) Mladost Zagreb (H)	2	2	0	0	26	15	+11	6	Knockout phase	—	13–8	13–7
2	(Montenegro) Primorac Kotor	2	1	0	1	23	22	+1	3	Knockout phase	—	—	—
3	(Hungary) ZF Eger	2	0	0	2	16	28	−12	0		—	9–15	—

Source: LEN
(H) Hosts

=== Group G ===
Pos	Team	Pld	W	D	L	GF	GA	GD	Pts	Qualification	(Hungary) SZO	(France) STR	(Greece) APO	(Spain) CNT
1	(Hungary) Szolnok (H)	3	3	0	0	48	30	+18	9	Knockout phase	—	15–5	13–11	20–14
2	(France) Strasbourg	3	2	0	1	23	31	−8	6	Knockout phase	—	—	8–7	—
3	(Greece) Apollon Smyrni	3	1	0	2	32	34	−2	3		—	—	—	14–13
4	(Spain) CN Terrassa	3	0	0	3	36	44	−8	0		—	9–10	—	—

Source: LEN
(H) Hosts

=== Group F ===
Pos	Team	Pld	W	D	L	GF	GA	GD	Pts	Qualification	(Russia) SIN	(Serbia) NBG	(Romania) ORA
1	(Russia) Sintez Kazan	2	2	0	0	24	17	+7	6	Knockout phase	—	—	—
2	(Serbia) Novi Beograd (H)	2	1	0	1	22	20	+2	3	Knockout phase	10–11	—	12–9
3	(Romania) Digi Oradea	2	0	0	2	16	25	−9	0		7–13	—	—

Source: LEN
(H) Hosts

== Knockout phase ==
Bracket

Eight-finals
(Russia) Sintez Kazan	12	6	18
(Russia) Dynamo Moscow	14	9	23
(France) Tourcoing	9	6	15
(Serbia) Crvena zvezda	12	7	19
(Serbia) Radnički Kragujevac (w/o)	11	11
(France) Strasbourg	10	10
(Montenegro) Primorac Kotor	8	16	24
(Hungary) Szolnok	18	17	35
(France) Pays d’Aix Natation	6	9	15
(Hungary) OSC Budapest	22	20	42
(Spain) Sabadell	9	17	26
(Spain) Mediterrani	9	6	15
(Spain) Barcelona	9	6	15
(Croatia) Mladost Zagreb	11	7	18
(Serbia) Novi Beograd	7	8	15
(Greece) Vouliagmeni	7	9	16

Quarter-finals
(Russia) Dynamo Moscow	8	9	17
(Serbia) Crvena zvezda	11	9	20
(Serbia) Radnički Kragujevac	12	10	22
(Hungary) Szolnok	14	10	24
(Hungary) OSC Budapest	17	10	27
(Spain) Sabadell	11	12	23
(Croatia) Mladost Zagreb	11	10	21 (8)
(Greece) Vouliagmeni (p)	10	11	21 (9)

Semi-finals
(Serbia) Crvena zvezda	12	8	20
(Hungary) Szolnok	20	15	35
(Hungary) OSC Budapest	10	11	21
(Greece) Vouliagmeni	7	9	16

Finals
(Hungary) Szolnok	14	8	22 (3)
(Hungary) OSC Budapest	11	11	22 (0)

=== Eight Finals ===
Team 1	Agg.	Team 2	1st leg	2nd leg
Radnički Kragujevac (Serbia)	11–10 (Note: Strasbourg could not play for the first leg due to a player testing positive to COVID-19. However, the primary reason for the suspension was a mistake made a few days earlier. Strasbourg did not undergo the mandatory PCR test two days before entering the hotel (the first testing had to be done 72 hours before the match, on Wednesday). As a result, it was decided that the match should be played on one leg, at Serbia, on the original date of the second leg.)	(France) Strasbourg	11–10	Suspended
Pays d’Aix Natation (France)	15–42	(Hungary) OSC Budapest	6–22	9–20
Tourcoing (France)	15–19	(Serbia) Crvena zvezda	9–12	6–7
Primorac Kotor (Montenegro)	24–35	(Hungary) Szolnok	8–18	16–17
Sabadell (Spain)	26–15	(Spain) Mediterrani	9–9	17–6
Novi Beograd (Serbia)	15–16	(Greece) Vouliagmeni	7–7	8–9
Sintez Kazan (Russia)	18–23	(Russia) Dynamo Moscow	12–14	6–9
Barcelona (Spain)	15–18	(Croatia) Mladost Zagreb	9–11	6–7

=== Quarter-finals ===
Team 1	Agg.	Team 2	1st leg	2nd leg
Dynamo Moscow (Russia)	17–20	(Serbia) Crvena zvezda	8–11	9–9
Radnički Kragujevac (Serbia)	22–24	(Hungary) Szolnok	12–14	10–10
Mladost Zagreb (Croatia)	21–21(8–9 p)	(Greece) Vouliagmeni	11–10	10–11
OSC Budapest (Hungary)	27–23	(Spain) Sabadell	17–11	10–12

=== Semi-finals ===
Team 1	Agg.	Team 2	1st leg	2nd leg
OSC Budapest (Hungary)	21–16	(Greece) Vouliagmeni	10–7	11–9
Crvena zvezda (Serbia)	20–35	(Hungary) Szolnok	12–20	8–15

=== Finals ===
Team 1	Agg.	Team 2	1st leg	2nd leg
Szolnok (Hungary)	22–22(0–3 p)	(Hungary) OSC Budapest	14–11	8–11

2020–21 LEN Euro Cup
Champions

Szolnok
1st Cup

== See also ==
- 2020–21 LEN Champions League
