= Gergő Zalánki =

Hungarian water polo player

Personal information
- Nationality: Hungarian
- Born: 26 February 1995 (age 31) Eger, Hungary
- Height: 1.92 m (6 ft 4 in)
- Weight: 85 kg (187 lb)

Sport
- Sport: Water polo
- Handedness: Left
- Position: Driver
- Current club: Olympiacos

Youth career
- Years: Team
- –: Eger

Senior clubs
- Years: Team
- –2016: Eger
- 2016–2017: OSC-Újbuda
- 2017–2019: Szolnok
- 2019–2021: Ferencváros
- 2021–2024: Pro Recco
- 2024–2026: Olympiacos
- 2026: Pro Recco
National team
- Years: Team
- 2015–: Hungary
Medal record
Men's water polo
Representing Hungary
Olympic Games
| Bronze medal – third place | 2020 Tokyo | Team |
World Championships
| Gold medal – first place | 2023 Fukuoka | Team |
| Silver medal – second place | 2017 Budapest | Team |
FINA World League
| Silver medal – second place | 2018 Budapest |
FINA World Cup
| Gold medal – first place | 2018 Berlin |
| Silver medal – second place | 2026 Sydney |
European Championship
| Gold medal – first place | 2020 Budapest |
| Silver medal – second place | 2022 Split |
| Bronze medal – third place | 2016 Belgrade |
Universiade
| Gold medal – first place | 2015 Gwangju | Team |
- Updated on 1 August 2023

Gergő Zalánki (born 26 February 1995) is a Hungarian professional water polo player. He was part of the national team of Hungary at the 2016 Summer Olympics.

== Honours ==
=== Club ===
Eger

- Hungarian Championship: 2013–14
- Hungarian Cup: 2015–16

Szolnok

- Hungarian Championship: 2017–18
- Hungarian Super Cup: 2017

Ferencváros

- LEN Champions League; runners-up: 2020–21
- Hungarian Cup: 2019–20, 2020–21
- LEN Super Cup: 2019

Pro Recco

- LEN Champions League: 2021–22, 2022–23; runners-up: 2023–24
- LEN Super Cup: 2021, 2022, 2023
- Serie A1: 2021–22, 2022–23, 2023–24
- Coppa Italia: 2021–22, 2022–23

Olympiacos

- Greek Championship: 2024–25
- Greek Cup: 2024–25, 2025–26

=== Individual ===
- FINA "World Player of the Year" award: 2023
- Total-Waterpolo-World Magazine's man water polo "World Player of the Year" award: 2023
- Swimming World Magazine's man water polo ''World Player of the Year " award: 2023
- LEN "European Player of the Year" award: 2023
- Member of the World Team by total-waterpolo: 2022, 2023
- LEN Champions League MVP: 2022–23
- LEN Champions League Final Eight MVP: 2023
- LEN Champions League Top Scorer: 2021–22
- LEN Champions League Right Winger of the Year: 2020–21, 2021–22, 2022–23, 2024–25
- World Championship MVP: 2023
- World Championship Team of the Tournament: 2019, 2023, 2024, 2025
- Serie A1 MVP: 2022–23, 2023–24
- Serie A1 Right Winger of the Year: 2021–22, 2022–23, 2023–24
- Hungarian Championship Top Scorer: 2019–20, 2020–21
- Hungarian Championship Right Winger of the Year: 2016–17, 2017–18, 2018–19, 2020–21
- Greek Championship MVP: 2024–25
- Greek Championship Right Winger of the Year: 2024–25

== Personal life ==
He is married to Fruzsina, and their son, Zénó was born in 2022.

== See also ==
- List of World Aquatics Championships medalists in water polo
