= István Kovács (water polo) =

Hungarian water polo player and coach

Personal information
- Born: 28 February 1957 (age 69) Budapest, Hungary

Sport
- Country: Hungary
- Sport: Water polo

István Kovács (born 28 February 1957 in Budapest, Hungary) is a Hungarian water polo player and coach. He was the head coach of the Romania men's national water polo team at the 2012 Summer Olympics in London, where his team finished tenth in the end.
