= Tamás Mezei (water polo) =

Hungarian water polo player

Personal information
- Nickname: Schultz
- Nationality: Hungarian
- Born: 14 September 1990 (age 36) Budapest, Hungary
- Height: 196 cm (77 in)

Sport
- Sport: Water polo
- Handedness: Left
- Position: Cenre Forward
- Current club: Vasas

Youth career
- Years: Team
- –: KSI

Senior clubs
- Years: Team
- –2010: Bp. Honvéd
- 2010–2011: Szolnok
- 2011–2013: Eger
- 2013–2014: BVSC-Zugló
- 2014–2018: Szolnok
- 2018–2021: Ferencváros
- 2021–present: Vasas
National team
- Years: Team
- 2014–: Hungary
Medal record
Men's water polo
Representing Hungary
Olympic Games
Bronze medal – third place	2020 Tokyo	Team
Universiade
Gold medal – first place	2013 Kazan	Team
- Updated on 8 August 2023

Tamás Mezei (born 14 September 1990) is a Hungarian water polo player. He competed in the 2020 Summer Olympics.
