= Gábor Kis =

Hungarian water polo player

Personal information
- Nickname: Kicsi
- Nationality: Hungarian
- Born: 27 September 1982 (age 44) Budapest, Hungary
- Height: 1.94 m (6 ft 4 1/2 in)

Sport
- Sport: Water polo
- Handedness: Right
- Position: Centre forward
- Current club: Invictus (tech. director)

Youth career
- Years: Team
- 1990–1996: Bp. Spartacus
- 1996–: BVSC

Senior clubs
- Years: Team
- –2004: BVSC-Brendon
- 2004–2008: Brendon-Fenstherm-ZF-Eger
- 2008–2010: TEVA-VasasPlaket
- 2010–2011: ZF-Eger
- 2011–2019: Szolnoki Dózsa
National team
- Years: Team
- 2002–2016: Hungary

Teams coached
- 2019–: Invictus (tech. director)
Medal record
Men's Water Polo
Representing Hungary
Olympic Games
Gold medal – first place	2008 Beijing	Team competition
World Championships
Silver medal – second place	2007 Melbourne	Team competition
European Championship
Silver medal – second place	2006 Belgrade	Team competition
Bronze medal – third place	2008 Málaga	Team competition
Bronze medal – third place	2016 Belgrade	Team competition

Gábor Kis (born 27 September 1982 in Budapest) is a Hungarian water polo player. He was a member of the gold medal-winning Hungary men's national water polo team at the 2008 Beijing Olympics.

== Honours ==
=== National ===
- Olympic Games: Gold medal - 2008
- World Championships: Silver medal - 2007
- European Championship: Silver medal - 2006; Bronze medal - 2008, 2016
- FINA World League: Silver medal - 2007
- FINA World Cup: Silver medal - 2006

145 present in the national team of Hungary.

- Junior World Championships: (Bronze medal - 2001)
- Youth European Championship: (Bronze medal - 1999)

=== Club ===
- Champions League Winners (1): (2017 - with Szolnok)
- Hungarian Championship (OB I): 6x (2009, 2010 - with Vasas; 2011 - with Eger; 2015, 2016, 2017 - with Szolnok)
- Hungarian Cup (Magyar Kupa): 4x (2007 - with Eger; 2009 - with Vasas; 2014, 2016 - with Szolnok)

== Awards ==
- Szalay Iván-díj (2000)
- MVP in Hungarian SuperCup: (2001)
- Best Eger Player of the Year - UPC Award: (2005)

Orders

- Officer's Cross of the Order of Merit of the Republic of Hungary (2008)

== See also ==
- Hungary men's Olympic water polo team records and statistics
- List of Olympic champions in men's water polo
- List of Olympic medalists in water polo (men)
- List of World Aquatics Championships medalists in water polo
