= List of minor planets: 631001–632000 =

The following is a partial list of minor planets, running from minor-planet number 631001 through 632000, inclusive. The primary data for this and other partial lists is based on JPL's "Small-Body Orbital Elements" and data available from the Minor Planet Center. Critical list information is also provided by the MPC, unless otherwise specified from Lowell Observatory. A detailed description of the table's columns and additional sources are given on the main page including a complete list of every page in this series, and a statistical break-up on the dynamical classification of minor planets.

Also see the summary list of all named bodies in numerical and alphabetical order, and the corresponding naming citations for the number range of this particular list. New namings may only be added to this list after official publication, as the preannouncement of names is condemned by the Working Group for Small Bodies Nomenclature of the International Astronomical Union.

Near-Earth obj.	MBA (inner)	MBA (outer)	Centaur
Mars-crosser	MBA (middle)	Jupiter trojan	Trans-Neptunian obj.
Unclassified

== 631001–631100 ==
Designation			Discovery			Properties		Ref
Permanent	Provisional	Named after	Date	Site	Discoverer(s)	Category	Diam.	Ref
631001	2006 SN_{444}	—	September 18, 2006	Kitt Peak	Spacewatch	·	2.1 km	MPC · JPL
631002	2006 SY_{445}	—	September 17, 2006	Kitt Peak	Spacewatch	·	2.4 km	MPC · JPL
631003	2006 SP_{446}	—	September 19, 2006	Kitt Peak	Spacewatch	·	2.8 km	MPC · JPL
631004	2006 SO_{448}	—	September 17, 2006	Kitt Peak	Spacewatch	·	1.2 km	MPC · JPL
631005	2006 SL_{450}	—	September 16, 2006	Kitt Peak	Spacewatch	MIS	2.0 km	MPC · JPL
631006	2006 SF_{454}	—	September 27, 2006	Kitt Peak	Spacewatch	·	1.2 km	MPC · JPL
631007	2006 SW_{454}	—	September 17, 2006	Kitt Peak	Spacewatch	·	990 m	MPC · JPL
631008	2006 SL_{456}	—	September 26, 2006	Kitt Peak	Spacewatch	·	2.5 km	MPC · JPL
631009	2006 SZ_{462}	—	September 26, 2006	Mount Lemmon	Mount Lemmon Survey	·	1.7 km	MPC · JPL
631010	2006 TS_{1}	—	October 1, 2006	Kitt Peak	Spacewatch	·	2.7 km	MPC · JPL
631011	2006 TP_{2}	—	October 2, 2006	Mount Lemmon	Mount Lemmon Survey	VER	2.7 km	MPC · JPL
631012	2006 TQ_{2}	—	October 2, 2006	Mount Lemmon	Mount Lemmon Survey	(5)	1.2 km	MPC · JPL
631013	2006 TB_{5}	—	September 17, 2006	Kitt Peak	Spacewatch	HNS	910 m	MPC · JPL
631014	2006 TY_{28}	—	October 12, 2006	Kitt Peak	Spacewatch	THM	2.1 km	MPC · JPL
631015	2006 TK_{34}	—	September 28, 2006	Mount Lemmon	Mount Lemmon Survey	·	1.4 km	MPC · JPL
631016	2006 TR_{42}	—	October 12, 2006	Kitt Peak	Spacewatch	·	870 m	MPC · JPL
631017	2006 TG_{49}	—	October 12, 2006	Palomar	NEAT	·	2.8 km	MPC · JPL
631018	2006 TD_{56}	—	September 29, 2000	Kitt Peak	Spacewatch	VER	2.4 km	MPC · JPL
631019	2006 TM_{58}	—	October 11, 2006	Mauna Kea	D. D. Balam	·	2.3 km	MPC · JPL
631020	2006 TT_{62}	—	November 21, 2003	Kitt Peak	Spacewatch	·	970 m	MPC · JPL
631021	2006 TB_{66}	—	August 27, 2006	Lulin	LUSS	·	2.8 km	MPC · JPL
631022	2006 TG_{66}	—	September 18, 2006	Catalina	CSS	·	800 m	MPC · JPL
631023	2006 TU_{68}	—	September 18, 2006	Kitt Peak	Spacewatch	·	3.8 km	MPC · JPL
631024	2006 TN_{70}	—	October 12, 2006	Palomar	NEAT	·	1.6 km	MPC · JPL
631025	2006 TA_{82}	—	September 22, 2006	Anderson Mesa	LONEOS	·	1.5 km	MPC · JPL
631026	2006 TZ_{97}	—	October 11, 2006	Kitt Peak	Spacewatch	HNS	950 m	MPC · JPL
631027	2006 TL_{112}	—	October 1, 2006	Apache Point	SDSS Collaboration	ADE	1.5 km	MPC · JPL
631028	2006 TT_{116}	—	November 16, 2006	Catalina	CSS	EUN	1.3 km	MPC · JPL
631029	2006 TW_{116}	—	October 3, 2006	Apache Point	SDSS Collaboration	(5)	1.2 km	MPC · JPL
631030	2006 TQ_{118}	—	October 11, 2006	Palomar	NEAT	WIT	1.2 km	MPC · JPL
631031	2006 TE_{119}	—	October 11, 2006	Apache Point	SDSS Collaboration	HYG	2.5 km	MPC · JPL
631032	2006 TF_{119}	—	October 11, 2006	Apache Point	SDSS Collaboration	·	2.1 km	MPC · JPL
631033	2006 TH_{120}	—	October 1, 2006	Apache Point	SDSS Collaboration	EOS	1.7 km	MPC · JPL
631034	2006 TY_{135}	—	September 28, 2006	Kitt Peak	Spacewatch	·	1.3 km	MPC · JPL
631035	2006 TJ_{137}	—	October 4, 2006	Mount Lemmon	Mount Lemmon Survey	·	660 m	MPC · JPL
631036	2006 TB_{139}	—	April 15, 2004	Siding Spring	SSS	·	3.0 km	MPC · JPL
631037	2006 TZ_{139}	—	October 3, 2006	Mount Lemmon	Mount Lemmon Survey	·	3.0 km	MPC · JPL
631038	2006 TF_{141}	—	October 13, 2006	Kitt Peak	Spacewatch	·	2.2 km	MPC · JPL
631039	2006 TY_{141}	—	October 2, 2006	Mount Lemmon	Mount Lemmon Survey	·	1.0 km	MPC · JPL
631040	2006 TU_{142}	—	September 15, 2017	Haleakala	Pan-STARRS 1	HYG	1.8 km	MPC · JPL
631041	2006 TC_{143}	—	October 2, 2006	Mount Lemmon	Mount Lemmon Survey	·	2.4 km	MPC · JPL
631042	2006 TF_{143}	—	September 28, 2006	Kitt Peak	Spacewatch	·	2.2 km	MPC · JPL
631043	2006 UT_{2}	—	October 16, 2006	Catalina	CSS	V	640 m	MPC · JPL
631044	2006 UJ_{11}	—	September 30, 2006	Mount Lemmon	Mount Lemmon Survey	·	1.6 km	MPC · JPL
631045	2006 UZ_{17}	—	October 16, 2006	Bergisch Gladbach	W. Bickel	VER	2.3 km	MPC · JPL
631046	2006 UN_{21}	—	April 24, 2003	Kitt Peak	Spacewatch	TIR	2.4 km	MPC · JPL
631047	2006 UA_{29}	—	September 26, 2006	Mount Lemmon	Mount Lemmon Survey	(12739)	1.6 km	MPC · JPL
631048	2006 UR_{49}	—	September 30, 2006	Kitt Peak	Spacewatch	·	1.3 km	MPC · JPL
631049	2006 US_{56}	—	January 26, 2003	Kitt Peak	Spacewatch	EOS	1.9 km	MPC · JPL
631050	2006 UZ_{60}	—	October 19, 2006	Mount Lemmon	Mount Lemmon Survey	·	3.4 km	MPC · JPL
631051	2006 UN_{75}	—	September 18, 2006	Kitt Peak	Spacewatch	·	1.5 km	MPC · JPL
631052	2006 UW_{91}	—	September 20, 2006	Kitt Peak	Spacewatch	·	1.2 km	MPC · JPL
631053	2006 UA_{94}	—	October 2, 2006	Mount Lemmon	Mount Lemmon Survey	·	1.5 km	MPC · JPL
631054	2006 UD_{97}	—	October 18, 2006	Kitt Peak	Spacewatch	·	1.7 km	MPC · JPL
631055	2006 UQ_{98}	—	October 18, 2006	Kitt Peak	Spacewatch	·	2.4 km	MPC · JPL
631056	2006 UO_{100}	—	October 18, 2006	Kitt Peak	Spacewatch	·	2.5 km	MPC · JPL
631057	2006 UM_{103}	—	April 14, 2005	Kitt Peak	Spacewatch	·	1.5 km	MPC · JPL
631058	2006 UL_{107}	—	October 18, 2006	Kitt Peak	Spacewatch	V	520 m	MPC · JPL
631059	2006 UX_{107}	—	October 18, 2006	Kitt Peak	Spacewatch	·	2.9 km	MPC · JPL
631060	2006 UZ_{108}	—	October 18, 2006	Kitt Peak	Spacewatch	EUN	1.1 km	MPC · JPL
631061	2006 UP_{110}	—	September 17, 2006	Catalina	CSS	MAR	990 m	MPC · JPL
631062	2006 UV_{124}	—	September 17, 2006	Kitt Peak	Spacewatch	·	2.4 km	MPC · JPL
631063	2006 UF_{127}	—	October 19, 2006	Kitt Peak	Spacewatch	·	690 m	MPC · JPL
631064	2006 UN_{129}	—	September 25, 2006	Mount Lemmon	Mount Lemmon Survey	·	2.5 km	MPC · JPL
631065	2006 UO_{129}	—	October 19, 2006	Kitt Peak	Spacewatch	·	2.4 km	MPC · JPL
631066	2006 UO_{145}	—	October 20, 2006	Kitt Peak	Spacewatch	·	2.6 km	MPC · JPL
631067	2006 UV_{145}	—	October 20, 2006	Kitt Peak	Spacewatch	·	3.0 km	MPC · JPL
631068	2006 UH_{150}	—	October 20, 2006	Mount Lemmon	Mount Lemmon Survey	·	2.8 km	MPC · JPL
631069	2006 UZ_{152}	—	October 21, 2006	Kitt Peak	Spacewatch	·	2.7 km	MPC · JPL
631070	2006 UX_{159}	—	October 21, 2006	Mount Lemmon	Mount Lemmon Survey	KOR	1.3 km	MPC · JPL
631071	2006 UG_{160}	—	October 21, 2006	Mount Lemmon	Mount Lemmon Survey	·	900 m	MPC · JPL
631072	2006 UL_{162}	—	October 21, 2006	Mount Lemmon	Mount Lemmon Survey	·	520 m	MPC · JPL
631073	2006 UV_{163}	—	June 4, 2005	Kitt Peak	Spacewatch	HYG	2.8 km	MPC · JPL
631074	2006 UQ_{170}	—	October 21, 2006	Mount Lemmon	Mount Lemmon Survey	·	2.3 km	MPC · JPL
631075	2006 UU_{175}	—	September 20, 2006	Palomar	NEAT	·	2.9 km	MPC · JPL
631076	2006 UG_{179}	—	October 16, 2006	Catalina	CSS	EUN	1.0 km	MPC · JPL
631077	2006 UA_{180}	—	October 12, 2006	Palomar	NEAT	·	4.0 km	MPC · JPL
631078	2006 UJ_{181}	—	October 16, 2006	Catalina	CSS	·	780 m	MPC · JPL
631079	2006 UG_{183}	—	September 16, 2006	Catalina	CSS	·	2.4 km	MPC · JPL
631080	2006 UT_{192}	—	October 19, 2006	Catalina	CSS	EUN	1.3 km	MPC · JPL
631081	2006 UF_{206}	—	April 10, 2005	Mount Lemmon	Mount Lemmon Survey	·	650 m	MPC · JPL
631082	2006 US_{207}	—	October 23, 2006	Kitt Peak	Spacewatch	·	1.2 km	MPC · JPL
631083	2006 UG_{208}	—	October 23, 2006	Kitt Peak	Spacewatch	·	610 m	MPC · JPL
631084	2006 UD_{210}	—	October 23, 2006	Kitt Peak	Spacewatch	·	1.7 km	MPC · JPL
631085	2006 UV_{216}	—	October 23, 2006	Mauna Kea	D. D. Balam	EOS	1.7 km	MPC · JPL
631086	2006 UH_{226}	—	September 19, 2006	Kitt Peak	Spacewatch	·	2.9 km	MPC · JPL
631087	2006 UD_{228}	—	October 20, 2006	Mount Lemmon	Mount Lemmon Survey	·	2.8 km	MPC · JPL
631088	2006 UV_{238}	—	October 19, 2006	Kitt Peak	Spacewatch	·	1.5 km	MPC · JPL
631089	2006 UU_{257}	—	September 25, 2006	Mount Lemmon	Mount Lemmon Survey	·	730 m	MPC · JPL
631090	2006 UH_{259}	—	October 28, 2006	Mount Lemmon	Mount Lemmon Survey	·	680 m	MPC · JPL
631091	2006 UL_{259}	—	October 20, 2006	Kitt Peak	Spacewatch	·	1.1 km	MPC · JPL
631092	2006 UH_{262}	—	September 21, 2001	Apache Point	SDSS Collaboration	·	1.6 km	MPC · JPL
631093	2006 UY_{272}	—	October 23, 2006	Kitt Peak	Spacewatch	·	2.9 km	MPC · JPL
631094	2006 UG_{284}	—	October 28, 2006	Kitt Peak	Spacewatch	THM	2.8 km	MPC · JPL
631095	2006 UL_{284}	—	September 26, 2006	Mount Lemmon	Mount Lemmon Survey	·	2.8 km	MPC · JPL
631096	2006 UM_{290}	—	October 31, 2006	Mauna Kea	D. D. Balam	·	2.5 km	MPC · JPL
631097	2006 UR_{293}	—	October 19, 2006	Kitt Peak	Deep Ecliptic Survey	·	2.4 km	MPC · JPL
631098	2006 UY_{301}	—	March 11, 2005	Kitt Peak	Deep Ecliptic Survey	·	740 m	MPC · JPL
631099	2006 UG_{305}	—	October 19, 2006	Kitt Peak	Deep Ecliptic Survey	·	1.5 km	MPC · JPL
631100	2006 UD_{308}	—	October 19, 2006	Kitt Peak	Deep Ecliptic Survey	·	1.9 km	MPC · JPL

== 631101–631200 ==
back to top

Designation			Discovery			Properties		Ref
Permanent	Provisional	Named after	Date	Site	Discoverer(s)	Category	Diam.	Ref
631101	2006 UA_{321}	—	November 24, 2006	Mount Lemmon	Mount Lemmon Survey	·	780 m	MPC · JPL
631102	2006 UA_{322}	—	September 25, 2006	Mount Lemmon	Mount Lemmon Survey	·	2.7 km	MPC · JPL
631103	2006 US_{330}	—	October 28, 2006	Catalina	CSS	·	2.9 km	MPC · JPL
631104	2006 UU_{330}	—	October 16, 2006	Apache Point	SDSS Collaboration	·	2.3 km	MPC · JPL
631105	2006 UV_{342}	—	November 1, 2006	Kitt Peak	Spacewatch	·	1.2 km	MPC · JPL
631106	2006 UY_{342}	—	November 12, 2006	Mount Lemmon	Mount Lemmon Survey	·	2.4 km	MPC · JPL
631107	2006 UH_{350}	—	February 24, 2008	Mount Lemmon	Mount Lemmon Survey	·	1.1 km	MPC · JPL
631108	2006 UG_{352}	—	October 26, 2006	Mauna Kea	P. A. Wiegert	·	1.4 km	MPC · JPL
631109	2006 UQ_{357}	—	October 27, 2006	Mount Lemmon	Mount Lemmon Survey	·	1.5 km	MPC · JPL
631110	2006 UX_{357}	—	October 6, 2012	Mount Lemmon	Mount Lemmon Survey	·	2.7 km	MPC · JPL
631111	2006 UB_{358}	—	September 15, 2006	Kitt Peak	Spacewatch	·	1.9 km	MPC · JPL
631112	2006 UM_{363}	—	July 31, 2005	Palomar	NEAT	·	3.3 km	MPC · JPL
631113	2006 UQ_{363}	—	October 16, 2006	Catalina	CSS	·	1.7 km	MPC · JPL
631114	2006 UX_{365}	—	October 19, 2006	Catalina	CSS	·	3.1 km	MPC · JPL
631115	2006 UH_{366}	—	October 19, 2006	Kitt Peak	Spacewatch	·	990 m	MPC · JPL
631116	2006 UL_{366}	—	October 13, 2006	Kitt Peak	Spacewatch	·	3.0 km	MPC · JPL
631117	2006 UO_{366}	—	October 18, 2006	Kitt Peak	Spacewatch	·	4.0 km	MPC · JPL
631118	2006 UR_{366}	—	February 2, 2014	Mount Lemmon	Mount Lemmon Survey	·	2.9 km	MPC · JPL
631119	2006 US_{366}	—	April 27, 2012	Haleakala	Pan-STARRS 1	·	640 m	MPC · JPL
631120	2006 UD_{368}	—	October 23, 2006	Kitt Peak	Spacewatch	·	2.7 km	MPC · JPL
631121	2006 UW_{368}	—	October 19, 2006	Kitt Peak	Spacewatch	·	1.9 km	MPC · JPL
631122	2006 US_{372}	—	December 6, 2012	Kitt Peak	Spacewatch	·	2.6 km	MPC · JPL
631123	2006 UT_{372}	—	October 22, 2006	Kitt Peak	Spacewatch	·	1.3 km	MPC · JPL
631124	2006 UK_{373}	—	July 1, 2014	Haleakala	Pan-STARRS 1	WIT	810 m	MPC · JPL
631125	2006 UC_{374}	—	October 17, 2012	Haleakala	Pan-STARRS 1	VER	2.4 km	MPC · JPL
631126	2006 UQ_{375}	—	November 4, 2012	Mount Lemmon	Mount Lemmon Survey	·	2.2 km	MPC · JPL
631127	2006 UR_{377}	—	October 21, 2006	Mount Lemmon	Mount Lemmon Survey	·	1.1 km	MPC · JPL
631128	2006 UF_{380}	—	October 9, 2015	Haleakala	Pan-STARRS 1	·	1.2 km	MPC · JPL
631129	2006 UY_{381}	—	October 22, 2006	Kitt Peak	Spacewatch	·	980 m	MPC · JPL
631130	2006 UR_{382}	—	October 31, 2006	Mount Lemmon	Mount Lemmon Survey	·	2.1 km	MPC · JPL
631131	2006 UF_{384}	—	October 17, 2006	Mount Lemmon	Mount Lemmon Survey	·	2.4 km	MPC · JPL
631132	2006 UO_{384}	—	October 19, 2006	Kitt Peak	Spacewatch	·	2.9 km	MPC · JPL
631133	2006 UP_{384}	—	October 21, 2006	Mount Lemmon	Mount Lemmon Survey	PHO	930 m	MPC · JPL
631134	2006 UQ_{384}	—	October 19, 2006	Mount Lemmon	Mount Lemmon Survey	·	1.2 km	MPC · JPL
631135	2006 UB_{387}	—	October 20, 2006	Kitt Peak	Spacewatch	·	2.3 km	MPC · JPL
631136	2006 UM_{389}	—	October 21, 2006	Mount Lemmon	Mount Lemmon Survey	·	2.7 km	MPC · JPL
631137	2006 VC_{9}	—	October 12, 2006	Kitt Peak	Spacewatch	·	2.8 km	MPC · JPL
631138	2006 VF_{11}	—	November 11, 2006	Mount Lemmon	Mount Lemmon Survey	·	2.9 km	MPC · JPL
631139	2006 VY_{14}	—	November 9, 2006	Kitt Peak	Spacewatch	·	1.8 km	MPC · JPL
631140	2006 VR_{21}	—	September 30, 2006	Mount Lemmon	Mount Lemmon Survey	·	1.4 km	MPC · JPL
631141	2006 VB_{24}	—	November 10, 2006	Kitt Peak	Spacewatch	·	1.5 km	MPC · JPL
631142	2006 VB_{26}	—	March 23, 2003	Kitt Peak	Spacewatch	·	3.0 km	MPC · JPL
631143	2006 VK_{39}	—	October 21, 2006	Kitt Peak	Spacewatch	·	650 m	MPC · JPL
631144	2006 VO_{40}	—	October 17, 2006	Mount Lemmon	Mount Lemmon Survey	·	2.6 km	MPC · JPL
631145	2006 VC_{47}	—	November 9, 2006	Kitt Peak	Spacewatch	·	1.3 km	MPC · JPL
631146	2006 VE_{52}	—	November 11, 2006	Kitt Peak	Spacewatch	·	3.4 km	MPC · JPL
631147	2006 VH_{63}	—	November 11, 2006	Kitt Peak	Spacewatch	·	690 m	MPC · JPL
631148	2006 VX_{75}	—	October 27, 2006	Mount Lemmon	Mount Lemmon Survey	TIR	4.3 km	MPC · JPL
631149	2006 VX_{82}	—	October 31, 2006	Mount Lemmon	Mount Lemmon Survey	·	1.6 km	MPC · JPL
631150	2006 VE_{88}	—	November 14, 2006	Mount Lemmon	Mount Lemmon Survey	HYG	2.4 km	MPC · JPL
631151	2006 VQ_{88}	—	October 23, 2006	Kitt Peak	Spacewatch	·	2.4 km	MPC · JPL
631152	2006 VO_{89}	—	November 1, 2006	Mount Lemmon	Mount Lemmon Survey	·	2.8 km	MPC · JPL
631153	2006 VQ_{100}	—	November 1, 2006	Catalina	CSS	·	770 m	MPC · JPL
631154	2006 VR_{103}	—	November 12, 2006	Lulin	LUSS	·	1.3 km	MPC · JPL
631155	2006 VB_{106}	—	November 13, 2006	Mount Lemmon	Mount Lemmon Survey	·	1.8 km	MPC · JPL
631156	2006 VS_{107}	—	April 12, 2004	Anderson Mesa	LONEOS	HNS	1.4 km	MPC · JPL
631157	2006 VS_{122}	—	October 20, 2006	Mount Lemmon	Mount Lemmon Survey	·	2.9 km	MPC · JPL
631158	2006 VQ_{126}	—	October 26, 2006	Lulin	LUSS	·	1.2 km	MPC · JPL
631159	2006 VX_{128}	—	July 8, 2005	Kitt Peak	Spacewatch	·	1.8 km	MPC · JPL
631160	2006 VF_{132}	—	November 15, 2006	Kitt Peak	Spacewatch	·	1.2 km	MPC · JPL
631161	2006 VQ_{134}	—	November 15, 2006	Catalina	CSS	·	1.8 km	MPC · JPL
631162	2006 VE_{144}	—	November 15, 2006	Kitt Peak	Spacewatch	·	1.1 km	MPC · JPL
631163	2006 VS_{148}	—	November 2, 2006	Mount Lemmon	Mount Lemmon Survey	·	720 m	MPC · JPL
631164	2006 VE_{156}	—	November 12, 2006	Mount Lemmon	Mount Lemmon Survey	·	1.0 km	MPC · JPL
631165	2006 VB_{173}	—	November 1, 2006	Kitt Peak	Spacewatch	·	1.0 km	MPC · JPL
631166	2006 VG_{173}	—	November 11, 2006	Kitt Peak	Spacewatch	GEF	1.2 km	MPC · JPL
631167	2006 VD_{175}	—	November 1, 2006	Mount Lemmon	Mount Lemmon Survey	EUN	1.1 km	MPC · JPL
631168	2006 VM_{175}	—	November 11, 2006	Mount Lemmon	Mount Lemmon Survey	MAR	910 m	MPC · JPL
631169	2006 VR_{176}	—	November 16, 2006	Mount Lemmon	Mount Lemmon Survey	·	1.0 km	MPC · JPL
631170	2006 VS_{176}	—	November 13, 2006	Catalina	CSS	LUT	4.2 km	MPC · JPL
631171	2006 VR_{177}	—	December 8, 2010	Mount Lemmon	Mount Lemmon Survey	V	590 m	MPC · JPL
631172	2006 VW_{178}	—	November 2, 2006	Mount Lemmon	Mount Lemmon Survey	URS	3.2 km	MPC · JPL
631173	2006 VX_{178}	—	May 7, 2014	Haleakala	Pan-STARRS 1	JUN	960 m	MPC · JPL
631174	2006 VF_{179}	—	October 15, 2017	Mount Lemmon	Mount Lemmon Survey	·	2.6 km	MPC · JPL
631175	2006 VQ_{179}	—	October 12, 2006	Kitt Peak	Spacewatch	HYG	2.5 km	MPC · JPL
631176	2006 VT_{180}	—	April 1, 2015	Haleakala	Pan-STARRS 1	·	590 m	MPC · JPL
631177	2006 VW_{181}	—	November 11, 2006	Mount Lemmon	Mount Lemmon Survey	·	1.4 km	MPC · JPL
631178	2006 VR_{183}	—	November 1, 2006	Kitt Peak	Spacewatch	·	2.9 km	MPC · JPL
631179	2006 WB_{9}	—	November 16, 2006	Kitt Peak	Spacewatch	EOS	1.8 km	MPC · JPL
631180	2006 WP_{13}	—	April 20, 2004	Kitt Peak	Spacewatch	AGN	1.4 km	MPC · JPL
631181	2006 WY_{15}	—	August 9, 2005	Cerro Tololo	Deep Ecliptic Survey	·	2.9 km	MPC · JPL
631182	2006 WQ_{18}	—	November 17, 2006	Mount Lemmon	Mount Lemmon Survey	·	2.3 km	MPC · JPL
631183	2006 WR_{18}	—	November 2, 2006	Kitt Peak	Spacewatch	·	2.1 km	MPC · JPL
631184	2006 WU_{20}	—	November 17, 2006	Mount Lemmon	Mount Lemmon Survey	·	2.6 km	MPC · JPL
631185	2006 WY_{21}	—	November 17, 2006	Mount Lemmon	Mount Lemmon Survey	·	1.4 km	MPC · JPL
631186	2006 WJ_{24}	—	November 17, 2006	Mount Lemmon	Mount Lemmon Survey	VER	1.9 km	MPC · JPL
631187	2006 WF_{34}	—	November 12, 2006	Mount Lemmon	Mount Lemmon Survey	·	2.8 km	MPC · JPL
631188	2006 WR_{40}	—	November 16, 2006	Kitt Peak	Spacewatch	·	3.0 km	MPC · JPL
631189	2006 WF_{41}	—	November 16, 2006	Kitt Peak	Spacewatch	·	3.8 km	MPC · JPL
631190	2006 WX_{41}	—	November 16, 2006	Mount Lemmon	Mount Lemmon Survey	·	680 m	MPC · JPL
631191	2006 WV_{63}	—	November 17, 2006	Mount Lemmon	Mount Lemmon Survey	·	1.2 km	MPC · JPL
631192	2006 WC_{65}	—	November 17, 2006	Mount Lemmon	Mount Lemmon Survey	·	4.2 km	MPC · JPL
631193	2006 WQ_{66}	—	November 17, 2006	Mount Lemmon	Mount Lemmon Survey	·	1.2 km	MPC · JPL
631194	2006 WH_{67}	—	November 17, 2006	Mount Lemmon	Mount Lemmon Survey	·	700 m	MPC · JPL
631195	2006 WB_{74}	—	November 18, 2006	Kitt Peak	Spacewatch	·	2.2 km	MPC · JPL
631196	2006 WK_{75}	—	November 18, 2006	Kitt Peak	Spacewatch	·	690 m	MPC · JPL
631197	2006 WP_{75}	—	November 18, 2006	Kitt Peak	Spacewatch	·	2.4 km	MPC · JPL
631198	2006 WS_{75}	—	November 18, 2006	Kitt Peak	Spacewatch	VER	2.5 km	MPC · JPL
631199	2006 WE_{76}	—	November 18, 2006	Kitt Peak	Spacewatch	ADE	1.8 km	MPC · JPL
631200	2006 WF_{77}	—	September 28, 2006	Mount Lemmon	Mount Lemmon Survey	VER	2.9 km	MPC · JPL

== 631201–631300 ==
back to top

Designation			Discovery			Properties		Ref
Permanent	Provisional	Named after	Date	Site	Discoverer(s)	Category	Diam.	Ref
631201	2006 WN_{78}	—	October 20, 2006	Mount Lemmon	Mount Lemmon Survey	·	1.9 km	MPC · JPL
631202 Aquarellia	2006 WW_{83}	Aquarellia	November 17, 2006	Nogales	J.-C. Merlin	·	1.2 km	MPC · JPL
631203	2006 WL_{85}	—	November 18, 2006	Kitt Peak	Spacewatch	·	1.1 km	MPC · JPL
631204	2006 WT_{90}	—	November 19, 2006	Kitt Peak	Spacewatch	·	2.2 km	MPC · JPL
631205	2006 WJ_{96}	—	October 28, 2006	Mount Lemmon	Mount Lemmon Survey	HYG	3.1 km	MPC · JPL
631206	2006 WE_{98}	—	November 11, 2006	Mount Lemmon	Mount Lemmon Survey	·	1.6 km	MPC · JPL
631207	2006 WJ_{101}	—	September 27, 2006	Mount Lemmon	Mount Lemmon Survey	·	1.6 km	MPC · JPL
631208	2006 WC_{112}	—	November 19, 2006	Kitt Peak	Spacewatch	MIS	2.0 km	MPC · JPL
631209	2006 WU_{114}	—	November 20, 2006	Kitt Peak	Spacewatch	·	2.9 km	MPC · JPL
631210	2006 WD_{118}	—	November 20, 2006	Kitt Peak	Spacewatch	·	2.5 km	MPC · JPL
631211	2006 WL_{124}	—	November 22, 2006	Mount Lemmon	Mount Lemmon Survey	WIT	760 m	MPC · JPL
631212	2006 WM_{129}	—	November 23, 2006	Kitt Peak	Spacewatch	·	1.9 km	MPC · JPL
631213	2006 WP_{129}	—	November 13, 2006	Catalina	CSS	·	2.6 km	MPC · JPL
631214	2006 WL_{136}	—	November 19, 2006	Kitt Peak	Spacewatch	·	2.3 km	MPC · JPL
631215	2006 WF_{138}	—	November 19, 2006	Catalina	CSS	EOS	2.6 km	MPC · JPL
631216	2006 WH_{142}	—	November 20, 2006	Kitt Peak	Spacewatch	·	1.6 km	MPC · JPL
631217	2006 WZ_{142}	—	November 20, 2006	Kitt Peak	Spacewatch	V	530 m	MPC · JPL
631218	2006 WC_{143}	—	November 20, 2006	Kitt Peak	Spacewatch	EUN	1.1 km	MPC · JPL
631219	2006 WW_{144}	—	October 23, 2006	Mount Lemmon	Mount Lemmon Survey	·	1.7 km	MPC · JPL
631220	2006 WF_{146}	—	November 20, 2006	Kitt Peak	Spacewatch	·	1.4 km	MPC · JPL
631221	2006 WX_{147}	—	November 20, 2006	Kitt Peak	Spacewatch	·	1.7 km	MPC · JPL
631222	2006 WN_{150}	—	August 10, 2001	Palomar	NEAT	·	1.8 km	MPC · JPL
631223	2006 WC_{151}	—	October 17, 2006	Kitt Peak	Spacewatch	·	1.4 km	MPC · JPL
631224	2006 WF_{167}	—	November 15, 2006	Kitt Peak	Spacewatch	·	1.6 km	MPC · JPL
631225	2006 WT_{171}	—	November 23, 2006	Kitt Peak	Spacewatch	·	1.4 km	MPC · JPL
631226	2006 WF_{173}	—	November 23, 2006	Kitt Peak	Spacewatch	·	1.5 km	MPC · JPL
631227	2006 WJ_{173}	—	November 23, 2006	Mount Lemmon	Mount Lemmon Survey	·	1.1 km	MPC · JPL
631228	2006 WS_{182}	—	November 24, 2006	Kitt Peak	Spacewatch	·	1.2 km	MPC · JPL
631229	2006 WP_{204}	—	September 17, 2006	Kitt Peak	Spacewatch	(5)	910 m	MPC · JPL
631230	2006 WE_{209}	—	November 21, 2006	Mount Lemmon	Mount Lemmon Survey	·	1.0 km	MPC · JPL
631231	2006 WO_{209}	—	November 28, 2006	Mount Lemmon	Mount Lemmon Survey	·	1.2 km	MPC · JPL
631232	2006 WS_{209}	—	September 29, 2011	Mount Lemmon	Mount Lemmon Survey	·	3.3 km	MPC · JPL
631233	2006 WX_{209}	—	January 20, 2013	Catalina	CSS	·	3.6 km	MPC · JPL
631234	2006 WY_{209}	—	September 24, 2011	Haleakala	Pan-STARRS 1	·	3.0 km	MPC · JPL
631235	2006 WV_{210}	—	October 3, 2014	Mount Lemmon	Mount Lemmon Survey	EUN	1.3 km	MPC · JPL
631236	2006 WW_{210}	—	March 28, 2015	Haleakala	Pan-STARRS 1	·	2.9 km	MPC · JPL
631237	2006 WZ_{210}	—	October 23, 2006	Mount Lemmon	Mount Lemmon Survey	·	750 m	MPC · JPL
631238	2006 WK_{211}	—	November 16, 2006	Kitt Peak	Spacewatch	·	2.8 km	MPC · JPL
631239	2006 WA_{213}	—	September 4, 2011	Haleakala	Pan-STARRS 1	·	2.4 km	MPC · JPL
631240	2006 WH_{213}	—	September 26, 2017	Haleakala	Pan-STARRS 1	·	2.4 km	MPC · JPL
631241	2006 WC_{214}	—	February 28, 2008	Kitt Peak	Spacewatch	·	1.4 km	MPC · JPL
631242	2006 WM_{217}	—	September 4, 2011	Haleakala	Pan-STARRS 1	·	2.7 km	MPC · JPL
631243	2006 WA_{218}	—	January 13, 2008	Kitt Peak	Spacewatch	·	2.1 km	MPC · JPL
631244	2006 WC_{218}	—	December 11, 2012	Mount Lemmon	Mount Lemmon Survey	·	2.5 km	MPC · JPL
631245	2006 WS_{218}	—	November 26, 2012	Mount Lemmon	Mount Lemmon Survey	·	3.3 km	MPC · JPL
631246	2006 WZ_{218}	—	July 1, 2014	Haleakala	Pan-STARRS 1	·	1.9 km	MPC · JPL
631247	2006 WK_{219}	—	July 25, 2014	Haleakala	Pan-STARRS 1	·	1.3 km	MPC · JPL
631248	2006 WJ_{220}	—	September 16, 2010	Kitt Peak	Spacewatch	·	1.2 km	MPC · JPL
631249	2006 WA_{223}	—	October 18, 2011	Mount Lemmon	Mount Lemmon Survey	VER	2.2 km	MPC · JPL
631250	2006 WD_{223}	—	February 10, 2008	Mount Lemmon	Mount Lemmon Survey	·	660 m	MPC · JPL
631251	2006 WY_{223}	—	April 14, 2015	Kitt Peak	Spacewatch	·	2.5 km	MPC · JPL
631252	2006 WB_{228}	—	August 28, 2014	Haleakala	Pan-STARRS 1	·	1.3 km	MPC · JPL
631253	2006 WM_{229}	—	November 11, 2006	Mount Lemmon	Mount Lemmon Survey	·	3.2 km	MPC · JPL
631254	2006 WP_{230}	—	November 27, 2006	Kitt Peak	Spacewatch	·	2.6 km	MPC · JPL
631255	2006 XQ_{1}	—	December 11, 2006	7300	W. K. Y. Yeung	·	1.5 km	MPC · JPL
631256	2006 XZ_{10}	—	December 9, 2006	Kitt Peak	Spacewatch	TIR	2.7 km	MPC · JPL
631257	2006 XW_{11}	—	December 10, 2006	Kitt Peak	Spacewatch	·	1.1 km	MPC · JPL
631258	2006 XQ_{12}	—	November 20, 2006	Kitt Peak	Spacewatch	·	1.3 km	MPC · JPL
631259	2006 XD_{24}	—	November 22, 2006	Mount Lemmon	Mount Lemmon Survey	·	750 m	MPC · JPL
631260	2006 XP_{24}	—	August 5, 2002	Palomar	NEAT	·	840 m	MPC · JPL
631261	2006 XA_{25}	—	February 6, 2003	Palomar	NEAT	·	2.1 km	MPC · JPL
631262	2006 XN_{27}	—	November 19, 2006	Kitt Peak	Spacewatch	·	1.6 km	MPC · JPL
631263	2006 XH_{35}	—	November 15, 2006	Mount Lemmon	Mount Lemmon Survey	·	1.7 km	MPC · JPL
631264	2006 XM_{50}	—	December 13, 2006	Mount Lemmon	Mount Lemmon Survey	·	3.5 km	MPC · JPL
631265	2006 XH_{51}	—	December 13, 2006	Kitt Peak	Spacewatch	V	530 m	MPC · JPL
631266	2006 XW_{54}	—	June 14, 2005	Mount Lemmon	Mount Lemmon Survey	·	1.7 km	MPC · JPL
631267	2006 XS_{60}	—	October 25, 2001	Apache Point	SDSS Collaboration	·	1.6 km	MPC · JPL
631268	2006 XP_{67}	—	December 13, 2006	Mauna Kea	D. D. Balam, K. M. Perrett	·	1.7 km	MPC · JPL
631269	2006 XK_{72}	—	December 13, 2006	Kitt Peak	Spacewatch	·	2.1 km	MPC · JPL
631270	2006 XX_{74}	—	March 31, 2008	Mount Lemmon	Mount Lemmon Survey	VER	3.0 km	MPC · JPL
631271	2006 XC_{75}	—	August 17, 2009	Kitt Peak	Spacewatch	·	1.1 km	MPC · JPL
631272	2006 XG_{75}	—	December 13, 2006	Kitt Peak	Spacewatch	GEF	1.2 km	MPC · JPL
631273	2006 XK_{75}	—	October 23, 2011	Mount Lemmon	Mount Lemmon Survey	·	3.0 km	MPC · JPL
631274	2006 XJ_{78}	—	December 10, 2006	Kitt Peak	Spacewatch	·	1.3 km	MPC · JPL
631275	2006 XW_{82}	—	December 13, 2006	Kitt Peak	Spacewatch	·	530 m	MPC · JPL
631276	2006 YV_{17}	—	January 27, 2003	Palomar	NEAT	·	1.6 km	MPC · JPL
631277	2006 YQ_{22}	—	November 15, 2006	Mount Lemmon	Mount Lemmon Survey	(21344)	1.6 km	MPC · JPL
631278	2006 YG_{23}	—	December 1, 2006	Mount Lemmon	Mount Lemmon Survey	·	2.1 km	MPC · JPL
631279	2006 YS_{27}	—	December 21, 2006	Kitt Peak	Spacewatch	·	530 m	MPC · JPL
631280	2006 YV_{27}	—	December 21, 2006	Kitt Peak	Spacewatch	·	1.2 km	MPC · JPL
631281	2006 YW_{27}	—	December 21, 2006	Kitt Peak	Spacewatch	HOF	2.3 km	MPC · JPL
631282	2006 YS_{29}	—	December 21, 2006	Kitt Peak	Spacewatch	·	2.2 km	MPC · JPL
631283	2006 YY_{32}	—	August 27, 2005	Palomar	NEAT	NEM	2.3 km	MPC · JPL
631284	2006 YY_{33}	—	November 25, 2006	Mount Lemmon	Mount Lemmon Survey	·	1.7 km	MPC · JPL
631285	2006 YG_{36}	—	December 21, 2006	Kitt Peak	Spacewatch	·	1.5 km	MPC · JPL
631286	2006 YH_{37}	—	December 21, 2006	Kitt Peak	Spacewatch	GEF	1.2 km	MPC · JPL
631287	2006 YS_{39}	—	December 22, 2006	Kitt Peak	Spacewatch	·	910 m	MPC · JPL
631288	2006 YB_{43}	—	December 24, 2006	Kitt Peak	Spacewatch	ADE	2.2 km	MPC · JPL
631289	2006 YA_{47}	—	June 17, 2005	Mount Lemmon	Mount Lemmon Survey	·	1.7 km	MPC · JPL
631290	2006 YW_{54}	—	December 21, 2006	Kitt Peak	L. H. Wasserman, M. W. Buie	·	2.2 km	MPC · JPL
631291	2006 YY_{54}	—	November 25, 2006	Kitt Peak	Spacewatch	·	2.9 km	MPC · JPL
631292	2006 YU_{56}	—	December 21, 2006	Kitt Peak	L. H. Wasserman, M. W. Buie	·	1.2 km	MPC · JPL
631293	2006 YN_{57}	—	September 29, 2009	Mount Lemmon	Mount Lemmon Survey	·	1.1 km	MPC · JPL
631294	2006 YQ_{57}	—	December 22, 2012	Piszkéstető	K. Sárneczky, Hodosan, G.	T_{j} (2.99)	3.4 km	MPC · JPL
631295	2006 YD_{58}	—	November 25, 2006	Kitt Peak	Spacewatch	·	2.9 km	MPC · JPL
631296	2006 YM_{58}	—	March 31, 2008	Mount Lemmon	Mount Lemmon Survey	DOR	2.3 km	MPC · JPL
631297	2006 YN_{58}	—	November 2, 2010	Mount Lemmon	Mount Lemmon Survey	WIT	800 m	MPC · JPL
631298	2006 YZ_{58}	—	December 16, 2006	Kitt Peak	Spacewatch	·	3.1 km	MPC · JPL
631299	2006 YJ_{60}	—	July 31, 2005	Palomar	NEAT	·	1.7 km	MPC · JPL
631300	2006 YB_{62}	—	December 21, 2006	Kitt Peak	Spacewatch	·	1.8 km	MPC · JPL

== 631301–631400 ==
back to top

Designation			Discovery			Properties		Ref
Permanent	Provisional	Named after	Date	Site	Discoverer(s)	Category	Diam.	Ref
631301	2006 YD_{66}	—	December 27, 2006	Mount Lemmon	Mount Lemmon Survey	·	1.5 km	MPC · JPL
631302	2006 YF_{66}	—	February 21, 2012	Mount Lemmon	Mount Lemmon Survey	MRX	830 m	MPC · JPL
631303	2006 YE_{67}	—	December 16, 2006	Kitt Peak	Spacewatch	NYS	640 m	MPC · JPL
631304	2006 YQ_{69}	—	December 27, 2006	Mount Lemmon	Mount Lemmon Survey	·	660 m	MPC · JPL
631305	2007 AX_{5}	—	January 8, 2007	Mount Lemmon	Mount Lemmon Survey	·	1.4 km	MPC · JPL
631306	2007 AS_{15}	—	January 10, 2007	Mount Lemmon	Mount Lemmon Survey	·	1.6 km	MPC · JPL
631307	2007 AT_{16}	—	January 15, 2007	Catalina	CSS	·	1.3 km	MPC · JPL
631308	2007 AF_{20}	—	January 10, 2007	Kitt Peak	Spacewatch	WIT	860 m	MPC · JPL
631309	2007 AK_{32}	—	August 3, 2016	Haleakala	Pan-STARRS 1	·	760 m	MPC · JPL
631310	2007 AH_{34}	—	January 8, 2007	Mount Lemmon	Mount Lemmon Survey	·	1.2 km	MPC · JPL
631311	2007 AZ_{34}	—	January 10, 2007	Mount Lemmon	Mount Lemmon Survey	·	970 m	MPC · JPL
631312	2007 AF_{35}	—	January 10, 2007	Kitt Peak	Spacewatch	·	1.3 km	MPC · JPL
631313	2007 AC_{36}	—	January 9, 2007	Mount Lemmon	Mount Lemmon Survey	·	750 m	MPC · JPL
631314	2007 BO_{1}	—	December 21, 2006	Palomar	NEAT	·	2.5 km	MPC · JPL
631315	2007 BR_{6}	—	November 17, 2006	Mount Lemmon	Mount Lemmon Survey	·	2.4 km	MPC · JPL
631316	2007 BF_{13}	—	January 17, 2007	Kitt Peak	Spacewatch	·	670 m	MPC · JPL
631317	2007 BQ_{13}	—	January 17, 2007	Kitt Peak	Spacewatch	·	2.0 km	MPC · JPL
631318	2007 BM_{21}	—	January 24, 2007	Kitt Peak	Spacewatch	·	2.1 km	MPC · JPL
631319	2007 BT_{28}	—	January 17, 2007	Mount Lemmon	Mount Lemmon Survey	·	1.9 km	MPC · JPL
631320	2007 BZ_{32}	—	January 24, 2007	Mount Lemmon	Mount Lemmon Survey	·	1.5 km	MPC · JPL
631321	2007 BZ_{33}	—	January 24, 2007	Mount Lemmon	Mount Lemmon Survey	NEM	1.6 km	MPC · JPL
631322	2007 BM_{54}	—	January 24, 2007	Kitt Peak	Spacewatch	·	830 m	MPC · JPL
631323	2007 BX_{54}	—	January 24, 2007	Mount Lemmon	Mount Lemmon Survey	EUN	1.3 km	MPC · JPL
631324	2007 BU_{60}	—	October 23, 2006	Kitt Peak	Spacewatch	·	3.0 km	MPC · JPL
631325	2007 BO_{65}	—	January 27, 2007	Mount Lemmon	Mount Lemmon Survey	·	940 m	MPC · JPL
631326	2007 BQ_{66}	—	January 27, 2007	Mount Lemmon	Mount Lemmon Survey	·	1.7 km	MPC · JPL
631327	2007 BH_{76}	—	December 13, 2006	Mount Lemmon	Mount Lemmon Survey	NEM	1.8 km	MPC · JPL
631328	2007 BZ_{76}	—	January 17, 2007	Palomar	NEAT	·	1.7 km	MPC · JPL
631329	2007 BP_{83}	—	April 8, 2008	Mount Lemmon	Mount Lemmon Survey	·	1.4 km	MPC · JPL
631330	2007 BH_{86}	—	January 19, 2007	Mauna Kea	P. A. Wiegert	·	1.2 km	MPC · JPL
631331	2007 BB_{96}	—	January 19, 2007	Mauna Kea	P. A. Wiegert	·	1.7 km	MPC · JPL
631332	2007 BV_{98}	—	February 6, 2007	Mount Lemmon	Mount Lemmon Survey	NEM	1.9 km	MPC · JPL
631333	2007 BE_{101}	—	December 23, 2006	Mount Lemmon	Mount Lemmon Survey	·	1.9 km	MPC · JPL
631334	2007 BR_{101}	—	April 24, 2003	Kitt Peak	Spacewatch	·	3.9 km	MPC · JPL
631335	2007 BD_{103}	—	January 27, 2007	Mount Lemmon	Mount Lemmon Survey	AGN	980 m	MPC · JPL
631336	2007 BP_{103}	—	January 24, 2007	Catalina	CSS	·	980 m	MPC · JPL
631337	2007 BT_{103}	—	January 27, 2007	Mount Lemmon	Mount Lemmon Survey	PAD	1.5 km	MPC · JPL
631338	2007 BR_{104}	—	November 3, 2010	Mount Lemmon	Mount Lemmon Survey	·	1.8 km	MPC · JPL
631339	2007 BD_{109}	—	December 3, 2015	Mount Lemmon	Mount Lemmon Survey	·	2.0 km	MPC · JPL
631340	2007 BL_{115}	—	January 27, 2007	Mount Lemmon	Mount Lemmon Survey	·	940 m	MPC · JPL
631341	2007 CE_{4}	—	February 6, 2007	Kitt Peak	Spacewatch	HNS	1.3 km	MPC · JPL
631342	2007 CE_{38}	—	January 27, 2007	Mount Lemmon	Mount Lemmon Survey	·	1.5 km	MPC · JPL
631343	2007 CK_{43}	—	November 1, 2006	Mount Lemmon	Mount Lemmon Survey	DOR	2.2 km	MPC · JPL
631344	2007 CC_{45}	—	November 24, 2002	Palomar	NEAT	·	1.1 km	MPC · JPL
631345	2007 CT_{49}	—	February 10, 2007	Mount Lemmon	Mount Lemmon Survey	·	1.5 km	MPC · JPL
631346	2007 CN_{61}	—	February 15, 2007	Palomar	NEAT	·	1.6 km	MPC · JPL
631347	2007 CZ_{66}	—	February 13, 2007	Mount Lemmon	Mount Lemmon Survey	·	1.6 km	MPC · JPL
631348	2007 CH_{70}	—	February 16, 2007	Mount Lemmon	Mount Lemmon Survey	HOF	2.1 km	MPC · JPL
631349	2007 CF_{80}	—	February 10, 2007	Mount Lemmon	Mount Lemmon Survey	GEF	1.1 km	MPC · JPL
631350	2007 CB_{85}	—	February 8, 2007	Kitt Peak	Spacewatch	·	1.1 km	MPC · JPL
631351	2007 DR_{12}	—	October 29, 2005	Catalina	CSS	·	3.7 km	MPC · JPL
631352	2007 DM_{23}	—	February 17, 2007	Kitt Peak	Spacewatch	·	1.8 km	MPC · JPL
631353	2007 DF_{29}	—	February 17, 2007	Socorro	LINEAR	·	1.5 km	MPC · JPL
631354	2007 DM_{30}	—	February 17, 2007	Kitt Peak	Spacewatch	·	1.6 km	MPC · JPL
631355	2007 DP_{39}	—	April 19, 1994	Kitt Peak	Spacewatch	·	2.0 km	MPC · JPL
631356	2007 DJ_{40}	—	February 19, 2007	Mount Lemmon	Mount Lemmon Survey	·	3.3 km	MPC · JPL
631357	2007 DB_{44}	—	February 17, 2007	Mount Lemmon	Mount Lemmon Survey	V	580 m	MPC · JPL
631358	2007 DN_{57}	—	August 31, 2005	Kitt Peak	Spacewatch	·	1.1 km	MPC · JPL
631359	2007 DO_{57}	—	February 21, 2007	Mount Lemmon	Mount Lemmon Survey	·	730 m	MPC · JPL
631360	2007 DD_{58}	—	February 21, 2007	Mount Lemmon	Mount Lemmon Survey	·	1.9 km	MPC · JPL
631361	2007 DZ_{58}	—	January 28, 2007	Mount Lemmon	Mount Lemmon Survey	·	1.8 km	MPC · JPL
631362	2007 DJ_{69}	—	February 21, 2007	Kitt Peak	Spacewatch	·	1.5 km	MPC · JPL
631363	2007 DA_{70}	—	February 21, 2007	Kitt Peak	Spacewatch	·	1.6 km	MPC · JPL
631364	2007 DD_{71}	—	February 21, 2007	Kitt Peak	Spacewatch	HOF	2.1 km	MPC · JPL
631365	2007 DT_{78}	—	February 23, 2007	Kitt Peak	Spacewatch	·	1.8 km	MPC · JPL
631366	2007 DX_{83}	—	February 25, 2007	Mount Lemmon	Mount Lemmon Survey	·	900 m	MPC · JPL
631367	2007 DV_{84}	—	February 21, 2007	Charleston	R. Holmes	·	1.5 km	MPC · JPL
631368	2007 DW_{87}	—	February 23, 2007	Kitt Peak	Spacewatch	·	1.5 km	MPC · JPL
631369	2007 DJ_{88}	—	January 28, 2007	Mount Lemmon	Mount Lemmon Survey	·	950 m	MPC · JPL
631370	2007 DT_{94}	—	February 23, 2007	Kitt Peak	Spacewatch	·	1.2 km	MPC · JPL
631371	2007 DW_{94}	—	February 23, 2007	Kitt Peak	Spacewatch	L5	8.3 km	MPC · JPL
631372	2007 DK_{103}	—	February 25, 2007	Kitt Peak	Spacewatch	·	1.4 km	MPC · JPL
631373	2007 DP_{109}	—	February 17, 2007	Goodricke-Pigott	R. A. Tucker	·	2.3 km	MPC · JPL
631374	2007 DZ_{114}	—	April 13, 2012	Haleakala	Pan-STARRS 1	AGN	910 m	MPC · JPL
631375	2007 DM_{118}	—	September 7, 2000	Kitt Peak	Spacewatch	·	1.7 km	MPC · JPL
631376	2007 DT_{118}	—	February 23, 2007	Kitt Peak	Spacewatch	·	1.8 km	MPC · JPL
631377	2007 DB_{120}	—	February 25, 2007	Kitt Peak	Spacewatch	·	1.2 km	MPC · JPL
631378	2007 DF_{120}	—	February 21, 2007	Mount Lemmon	Mount Lemmon Survey	·	1.2 km	MPC · JPL
631379	2007 DT_{120}	—	October 11, 2012	Mount Lemmon	Mount Lemmon Survey	V	600 m	MPC · JPL
631380	2007 DS_{125}	—	February 16, 2007	Mount Lemmon	Mount Lemmon Survey	·	740 m	MPC · JPL
631381	2007 DG_{127}	—	February 25, 2007	Kitt Peak	Spacewatch	AGN	890 m	MPC · JPL
631382	2007 DY_{128}	—	February 25, 2007	Mount Lemmon	Mount Lemmon Survey	·	1.9 km	MPC · JPL
631383	2007 DT_{129}	—	February 26, 2007	Mount Lemmon	Mount Lemmon Survey	·	1.7 km	MPC · JPL
631384	2007 DT_{130}	—	February 25, 2007	Mount Lemmon	Mount Lemmon Survey	·	1.7 km	MPC · JPL
631385	2007 EW_{8}	—	August 28, 2001	Kitt Peak	Spacewatch	·	1.2 km	MPC · JPL
631386	2007 ET_{14}	—	October 29, 2005	Kitt Peak	Spacewatch	HOF	2.2 km	MPC · JPL
631387	2007 EK_{15}	—	February 23, 2007	Mount Lemmon	Mount Lemmon Survey	HOF	2.7 km	MPC · JPL
631388	2007 EL_{15}	—	January 21, 2002	Kitt Peak	Spacewatch	·	1.7 km	MPC · JPL
631389	2007 EH_{20}	—	March 10, 2007	Mount Lemmon	Mount Lemmon Survey	AGN	1.0 km	MPC · JPL
631390	2007 EK_{20}	—	July 17, 2004	Campo Imperatore	CINEOS	·	2.2 km	MPC · JPL
631391	2007 EC_{24}	—	March 10, 2007	Mount Lemmon	Mount Lemmon Survey	·	990 m	MPC · JPL
631392	2007 EE_{24}	—	March 10, 2007	Mount Lemmon	Mount Lemmon Survey	·	1.1 km	MPC · JPL
631393	2007 ER_{27}	—	March 9, 2007	Kitt Peak	Spacewatch	AGN	1.0 km	MPC · JPL
631394	2007 EC_{28}	—	March 9, 2007	Catalina	CSS	·	750 m	MPC · JPL
631395	2007 EO_{33}	—	March 10, 2007	Mount Lemmon	Mount Lemmon Survey	HOF	2.1 km	MPC · JPL
631396	2007 EB_{38}	—	March 11, 2007	Mount Lemmon	Mount Lemmon Survey	·	1.7 km	MPC · JPL
631397	2007 ES_{44}	—	February 23, 2007	Kitt Peak	Spacewatch	·	2.2 km	MPC · JPL
631398	2007 EL_{55}	—	March 12, 2007	Mount Lemmon	Mount Lemmon Survey	L5	7.5 km	MPC · JPL
631399	2007 EP_{59}	—	February 21, 2007	Mount Lemmon	Mount Lemmon Survey	NYS	1.2 km	MPC · JPL
631400	2007 ER_{67}	—	February 17, 2007	Kitt Peak	Spacewatch	·	1.1 km	MPC · JPL

== 631401–631500 ==
back to top

Designation			Discovery			Properties		Ref
Permanent	Provisional	Named after	Date	Site	Discoverer(s)	Category	Diam.	Ref
631401	2007 EL_{77}	—	January 29, 2003	Apache Point	SDSS Collaboration	V	670 m	MPC · JPL
631402	2007 EW_{77}	—	September 18, 1998	Kitt Peak	Spacewatch	·	1.1 km	MPC · JPL
631403	2007 ET_{80}	—	December 21, 2006	Kitt Peak	L. H. Wasserman, M. W. Buie	·	1.3 km	MPC · JPL
631404	2007 EW_{83}	—	March 12, 2007	Mount Lemmon	Mount Lemmon Survey	AGN	920 m	MPC · JPL
631405	2007 EM_{86}	—	March 20, 2002	Socorro	LINEAR	H	550 m	MPC · JPL
631406	2007 ET_{86}	—	October 11, 2005	Anderson Mesa	LONEOS	·	1.5 km	MPC · JPL
631407	2007 EB_{92}	—	March 10, 2007	Kitt Peak	Spacewatch	·	1.5 km	MPC · JPL
631408	2007 EG_{100}	—	March 11, 2007	Kitt Peak	Spacewatch	·	560 m	MPC · JPL
631409	2007 EA_{103}	—	February 21, 2007	Kitt Peak	Spacewatch	·	3.8 km	MPC · JPL
631410	2007 ED_{103}	—	March 11, 2007	Mount Lemmon	Mount Lemmon Survey	PAD	1.1 km	MPC · JPL
631411	2007 EH_{103}	—	February 23, 2007	Mount Lemmon	Mount Lemmon Survey	·	2.8 km	MPC · JPL
631412	2007 EU_{106}	—	March 11, 2007	Kitt Peak	Spacewatch	·	970 m	MPC · JPL
631413	2007 ES_{119}	—	March 13, 2007	Mount Lemmon	Mount Lemmon Survey	·	2.1 km	MPC · JPL
631414	2007 EA_{123}	—	April 11, 2003	Kitt Peak	Spacewatch	·	1.9 km	MPC · JPL
631415	2007 ER_{128}	—	August 23, 2004	Kitt Peak	Spacewatch	·	1.9 km	MPC · JPL
631416	2007 ET_{128}	—	March 9, 2007	Mount Lemmon	Mount Lemmon Survey	·	1.4 km	MPC · JPL
631417	2007 EG_{129}	—	September 21, 2001	Kitt Peak	Spacewatch	(5)	930 m	MPC · JPL
631418	2007 EA_{133}	—	March 9, 2007	Mount Lemmon	Mount Lemmon Survey	·	1.5 km	MPC · JPL
631419	2007 EN_{140}	—	February 22, 2007	Kitt Peak	Spacewatch	PAD	1.5 km	MPC · JPL
631420	2007 ES_{148}	—	December 27, 2005	Kitt Peak	Spacewatch	·	1.9 km	MPC · JPL
631421	2007 EM_{152}	—	December 1, 2005	Mount Lemmon	Mount Lemmon Survey	·	2.0 km	MPC · JPL
631422	2007 ER_{152}	—	March 12, 2007	Mount Lemmon	Mount Lemmon Survey	·	2.2 km	MPC · JPL
631423	2007 EY_{159}	—	March 14, 2007	Mount Lemmon	Mount Lemmon Survey	·	1.2 km	MPC · JPL
631424	2007 EG_{162}	—	March 15, 2007	Mount Lemmon	Mount Lemmon Survey	·	3.1 km	MPC · JPL
631425	2007 EL_{173}	—	March 14, 2007	Kitt Peak	Spacewatch	·	2.3 km	MPC · JPL
631426	2007 EK_{178}	—	December 2, 2005	Kitt Peak	Spacewatch	·	1.0 km	MPC · JPL
631427	2007 EV_{183}	—	March 12, 2007	Mount Lemmon	Mount Lemmon Survey	HOF	2.3 km	MPC · JPL
631428	2007 ED_{184}	—	March 12, 2007	Mount Lemmon	Mount Lemmon Survey	·	2.0 km	MPC · JPL
631429	2007 EP_{186}	—	March 15, 2007	Mount Lemmon	Mount Lemmon Survey	·	1.6 km	MPC · JPL
631430	2007 EE_{187}	—	October 27, 2005	Mount Lemmon	Mount Lemmon Survey	·	1.9 km	MPC · JPL
631431	2007 EG_{190}	—	March 13, 2007	Mount Lemmon	Mount Lemmon Survey	·	1.6 km	MPC · JPL
631432	2007 EP_{192}	—	March 14, 2007	Catalina	CSS	·	2.6 km	MPC · JPL
631433	2007 ED_{194}	—	March 14, 2007	Kitt Peak	Spacewatch	·	1.1 km	MPC · JPL
631434	2007 EG_{205}	—	September 14, 1998	Kitt Peak	Spacewatch	·	3.6 km	MPC · JPL
631435	2007 EH_{206}	—	March 12, 2007	Mount Lemmon	Mount Lemmon Survey	·	2.0 km	MPC · JPL
631436	2007 EF_{208}	—	March 14, 2007	Mount Lemmon	Mount Lemmon Survey	MRX	980 m	MPC · JPL
631437	2007 EQ_{212}	—	February 23, 2007	Kitt Peak	Spacewatch	·	4.3 km	MPC · JPL
631438	2007 ES_{225}	—	May 23, 2001	Cerro Tololo	Deep Ecliptic Survey	L5	7.8 km	MPC · JPL
631439	2007 ES_{227}	—	August 27, 2009	Kitt Peak	Spacewatch	·	1.7 km	MPC · JPL
631440	2007 EY_{227}	—	December 11, 2014	Mount Lemmon	Mount Lemmon Survey	·	1.9 km	MPC · JPL
631441	2007 EB_{228}	—	March 9, 2007	Kitt Peak	Spacewatch	·	1 km	MPC · JPL
631442	2007 EF_{228}	—	March 9, 2007	Kitt Peak	Spacewatch	·	1.2 km	MPC · JPL
631443	2007 ER_{231}	—	March 2, 2016	Mount Lemmon	Mount Lemmon Survey	·	1.8 km	MPC · JPL
631444	2007 EY_{235}	—	January 17, 2016	La Palma	La Palma	·	1.6 km	MPC · JPL
631445	2007 EZ_{235}	—	September 6, 2008	Mount Lemmon	Mount Lemmon Survey	MAS	660 m	MPC · JPL
631446	2007 EW_{236}	—	February 28, 2012	Haleakala	Pan-STARRS 1	·	1.6 km	MPC · JPL
631447	2007 EK_{238}	—	March 13, 2007	Mount Lemmon	Mount Lemmon Survey	WIT	820 m	MPC · JPL
631448	2007 EQ_{241}	—	March 11, 2007	Kitt Peak	Spacewatch	·	1.8 km	MPC · JPL
631449	2007 EN_{243}	—	March 15, 2007	Kitt Peak	Spacewatch	·	1 km	MPC · JPL
631450	2007 FC_{8}	—	October 7, 2004	Kitt Peak	Spacewatch	·	1.8 km	MPC · JPL
631451	2007 FL_{10}	—	March 16, 2007	Kitt Peak	Spacewatch	·	1.2 km	MPC · JPL
631452	2007 FM_{12}	—	March 18, 2007	Kitt Peak	Spacewatch	·	1.5 km	MPC · JPL
631453	2007 FV_{13}	—	March 19, 2007	Mount Lemmon	Mount Lemmon Survey	L5	6.9 km	MPC · JPL
631454	2007 FT_{17}	—	March 20, 2007	Mount Lemmon	Mount Lemmon Survey	·	1.5 km	MPC · JPL
631455	2007 FO_{18}	—	January 17, 2007	Palomar	NEAT	·	1.1 km	MPC · JPL
631456	2007 FE_{40}	—	March 19, 2007	Mount Lemmon	Mount Lemmon Survey	·	1.7 km	MPC · JPL
631457	2007 FY_{41}	—	March 26, 2007	Mount Lemmon	Mount Lemmon Survey	·	1.6 km	MPC · JPL
631458	2007 FA_{49}	—	March 26, 2007	Mount Lemmon	Mount Lemmon Survey	·	800 m	MPC · JPL
631459	2007 FB_{51}	—	March 18, 2007	Kitt Peak	Spacewatch	·	1.2 km	MPC · JPL
631460	2007 FJ_{54}	—	March 16, 2007	Kitt Peak	Spacewatch	L5	6.5 km	MPC · JPL
631461	2007 FL_{56}	—	February 13, 2011	Mount Lemmon	Mount Lemmon Survey	·	1.8 km	MPC · JPL
631462	2007 FR_{56}	—	November 8, 2009	Kitt Peak	Spacewatch	·	2.3 km	MPC · JPL
631463	2007 FV_{59}	—	March 20, 2007	Kitt Peak	Spacewatch	·	1.5 km	MPC · JPL
631464	2007 GV_{3}	—	April 11, 2007	Tiki	Teamo, N., S. F. Hönig	DOR	2.3 km	MPC · JPL
631465	2007 GE_{23}	—	April 11, 2007	Mount Lemmon	Mount Lemmon Survey	·	1.8 km	MPC · JPL
631466	2007 GA_{26}	—	December 7, 2005	Kitt Peak	Spacewatch	HOF	2.3 km	MPC · JPL
631467	2007 GX_{28}	—	April 8, 2007	Bergisch Gladbach	W. Bickel	HOF	2.4 km	MPC · JPL
631468	2007 GR_{29}	—	April 11, 2007	Siding Spring	SSS	·	2.8 km	MPC · JPL
631469	2007 GP_{34}	—	March 11, 2007	Kitt Peak	Spacewatch	MAS	620 m	MPC · JPL
631470	2007 GQ_{34}	—	April 14, 2007	Kitt Peak	Spacewatch	·	1.7 km	MPC · JPL
631471	2007 GL_{39}	—	April 14, 2007	Kitt Peak	Spacewatch	V	680 m	MPC · JPL
631472	2007 GJ_{50}	—	March 18, 2007	Kitt Peak	Spacewatch	·	2.6 km	MPC · JPL
631473	2007 GG_{55}	—	April 15, 2007	Kitt Peak	Spacewatch	·	2.3 km	MPC · JPL
631474	2007 GD_{62}	—	April 15, 2007	Kitt Peak	Spacewatch	·	1.7 km	MPC · JPL
631475	2007 GH_{74}	—	March 26, 2007	Mount Lemmon	Mount Lemmon Survey	·	2.3 km	MPC · JPL
631476	2007 GZ_{75}	—	March 26, 2007	Kitt Peak	Spacewatch	·	1.8 km	MPC · JPL
631477	2007 GY_{78}	—	April 7, 2007	Mount Lemmon	Mount Lemmon Survey	MAS	640 m	MPC · JPL
631478	2007 GF_{79}	—	March 7, 2016	Haleakala	Pan-STARRS 1	·	1.8 km	MPC · JPL
631479	2007 HT_{9}	—	April 18, 2007	Mount Lemmon	Mount Lemmon Survey	L5	6.7 km	MPC · JPL
631480	2007 HR_{13}	—	April 11, 2007	Mount Lemmon	Mount Lemmon Survey	AGN	1.1 km	MPC · JPL
631481	2007 HE_{19}	—	September 18, 2001	Kitt Peak	Spacewatch	·	830 m	MPC · JPL
631482	2007 HS_{19}	—	April 14, 2007	Kitt Peak	Spacewatch	·	2.3 km	MPC · JPL
631483	2007 HH_{31}	—	September 11, 2004	Kitt Peak	Spacewatch	MAS	730 m	MPC · JPL
631484	2007 HU_{40}	—	April 8, 2002	Kitt Peak	Spacewatch	·	2.1 km	MPC · JPL
631485	2007 HY_{41}	—	October 12, 2005	Kitt Peak	Spacewatch	MAS	710 m	MPC · JPL
631486	2007 HD_{45}	—	September 4, 2000	Kitt Peak	Spacewatch	PHO	830 m	MPC · JPL
631487	2007 HF_{53}	—	September 18, 2003	Kitt Peak	Spacewatch	·	2.7 km	MPC · JPL
631488	2007 HD_{63}	—	March 26, 2003	Kitt Peak	Spacewatch	·	1.2 km	MPC · JPL
631489	2007 HW_{64}	—	April 22, 2007	Mount Lemmon	Mount Lemmon Survey	·	1.9 km	MPC · JPL
631490	2007 HZ_{64}	—	April 22, 2007	Mount Lemmon	Mount Lemmon Survey	·	1.7 km	MPC · JPL
631491	2007 HK_{74}	—	September 20, 2003	Anderson Mesa	LONEOS	·	2.9 km	MPC · JPL
631492	2007 HE_{77}	—	January 7, 2006	Mount Lemmon	Mount Lemmon Survey	·	2.4 km	MPC · JPL
631493	2007 HN_{78}	—	January 9, 2002	Kitt Peak	Spacewatch	·	1.7 km	MPC · JPL
631494	2007 HV_{84}	—	January 5, 2006	Mount Lemmon	Mount Lemmon Survey	·	860 m	MPC · JPL
631495	2007 HA_{91}	—	April 18, 2007	Kitt Peak	Spacewatch	·	2.1 km	MPC · JPL
631496	2007 HU_{92}	—	April 23, 2007	Kitt Peak	Spacewatch	·	1.6 km	MPC · JPL
631497	2007 HD_{99}	—	April 25, 2007	Kitt Peak	Spacewatch	EOS	2.1 km	MPC · JPL
631498	2007 HY_{100}	—	September 27, 2009	Kitt Peak	Spacewatch	·	1.5 km	MPC · JPL
631499	2007 HZ_{100}	—	February 25, 2011	Mount Lemmon	Mount Lemmon Survey	KOR	1.2 km	MPC · JPL
631500	2007 HX_{102}	—	April 24, 2007	Mount Lemmon	Mount Lemmon Survey	·	1.6 km	MPC · JPL

== 631501–631600 ==
back to top

Designation			Discovery			Properties		Ref
Permanent	Provisional	Named after	Date	Site	Discoverer(s)	Category	Diam.	Ref
631501	2007 HL_{104}	—	October 17, 2010	Mount Lemmon	Mount Lemmon Survey	·	3.2 km	MPC · JPL
631502	2007 HT_{104}	—	April 25, 2007	Kitt Peak	Spacewatch	·	2.2 km	MPC · JPL
631503	2007 HA_{105}	—	March 13, 2011	Kitt Peak	Spacewatch	·	1.4 km	MPC · JPL
631504	2007 HR_{105}	—	August 18, 2009	Kitt Peak	Spacewatch	·	1.7 km	MPC · JPL
631505	2007 HZ_{105}	—	May 28, 2012	Mount Lemmon	Mount Lemmon Survey	AGN	1.1 km	MPC · JPL
631506	2007 HF_{106}	—	February 12, 2011	Mount Lemmon	Mount Lemmon Survey	·	1.7 km	MPC · JPL
631507	2007 HM_{107}	—	April 19, 2007	Kitt Peak	Spacewatch	·	1.2 km	MPC · JPL
631508	2007 HZ_{113}	—	April 19, 2007	Kitt Peak	Spacewatch	KOR	1.3 km	MPC · JPL
631509	2007 HC_{117}	—	April 22, 2007	Kitt Peak	Spacewatch	KOR	1.1 km	MPC · JPL
631510	2007 HD_{117}	—	April 18, 2007	Mount Lemmon	Mount Lemmon Survey	·	880 m	MPC · JPL
631511	2007 JP_{6}	—	April 19, 2002	Kitt Peak	Spacewatch	KOR	1.3 km	MPC · JPL
631512	2007 JR_{7}	—	April 18, 2007	Kitt Peak	Spacewatch	·	2.2 km	MPC · JPL
631513	2007 JZ_{9}	—	March 13, 2007	Mount Lemmon	Mount Lemmon Survey	L5	9.5 km	MPC · JPL
631514	2007 JN_{20}	—	April 22, 2007	Kitt Peak	Spacewatch	(2076)	690 m	MPC · JPL
631515	2007 JD_{30}	—	May 11, 2007	Mount Lemmon	Mount Lemmon Survey	·	1.2 km	MPC · JPL
631516	2007 JM_{34}	—	April 20, 2007	Kitt Peak	Spacewatch	·	1.8 km	MPC · JPL
631517	2007 JQ_{35}	—	April 22, 2007	Kitt Peak	Spacewatch	·	2.0 km	MPC · JPL
631518	2007 JY_{37}	—	May 12, 2007	Mount Lemmon	Mount Lemmon Survey	·	940 m	MPC · JPL
631519	2007 JH_{38}	—	April 20, 2007	Kitt Peak	Spacewatch	HOF	2.5 km	MPC · JPL
631520	2007 JR_{39}	—	February 26, 2007	Mount Lemmon	Mount Lemmon Survey	·	1.1 km	MPC · JPL
631521	2007 JS_{39}	—	May 11, 2007	Siding Spring	SSS	EUN	1.8 km	MPC · JPL
631522	2007 JU_{48}	—	October 10, 2010	Mount Lemmon	Mount Lemmon Survey	SYL	4.3 km	MPC · JPL
631523	2007 JB_{49}	—	September 9, 2008	Mount Lemmon	Mount Lemmon Survey	·	1.7 km	MPC · JPL
631524	2007 JQ_{49}	—	September 3, 2008	Kitt Peak	Spacewatch	·	1.1 km	MPC · JPL
631525	2007 KF	—	May 16, 2007	Wrightwood	J. W. Young	·	1.4 km	MPC · JPL
631526	2007 KJ_{11}	—	November 8, 2009	Mount Lemmon	Mount Lemmon Survey	·	2.3 km	MPC · JPL
631527	2007 KL_{11}	—	March 11, 2011	Catalina	CSS	·	1.9 km	MPC · JPL
631528	2007 LB_{23}	—	June 13, 2007	Kitt Peak	Spacewatch	MRX	1.4 km	MPC · JPL
631529	2007 LF_{27}	—	June 12, 2007	Kitt Peak	Spacewatch	PHO	780 m	MPC · JPL
631530	2007 LW_{29}	—	January 30, 2006	Kitt Peak	Spacewatch	·	1.5 km	MPC · JPL
631531	2007 LV_{31}	—	June 15, 2007	Kitt Peak	Spacewatch	·	1.1 km	MPC · JPL
631532	2007 LL_{38}	—	November 23, 2009	Mount Lemmon	Mount Lemmon Survey	(16286)	1.9 km	MPC · JPL
631533	2007 MZ	—	February 4, 2006	Mount Lemmon	Mount Lemmon Survey	·	1.9 km	MPC · JPL
631534	2007 MJ_{18}	—	December 5, 1999	Kitt Peak	Spacewatch	·	1.6 km	MPC · JPL
631535	2007 MJ_{22}	—	June 22, 2007	Kitt Peak	Spacewatch	3:2	5.0 km	MPC · JPL
631536	2007 MA_{28}	—	October 4, 2013	Mount Lemmon	Mount Lemmon Survey	·	1.8 km	MPC · JPL
631537	2007 MQ_{29}	—	January 20, 2015	Haleakala	Pan-STARRS 1	·	1.9 km	MPC · JPL
631538	2007 MO_{30}	—	June 21, 2007	Mount Lemmon	Mount Lemmon Survey	·	3.1 km	MPC · JPL
631539	2007 NQ_{7}	—	December 21, 2008	Catalina	CSS	EUN	1.7 km	MPC · JPL
631540	2007 OM_{6}	—	July 15, 2007	Siding Spring	SSS	·	1.3 km	MPC · JPL
631541	2007 OU_{11}	—	October 11, 2012	Mount Lemmon	Mount Lemmon Survey	·	2.3 km	MPC · JPL
631542	2007 PK_{1}	—	January 14, 2011	Kitt Peak	Spacewatch	·	2.9 km	MPC · JPL
631543	2007 PV_{4}	—	August 9, 2007	Kitt Peak	Spacewatch	·	1.7 km	MPC · JPL
631544	2007 PZ_{12}	—	September 27, 2003	Anderson Mesa	LONEOS	·	2.2 km	MPC · JPL
631545	2007 PN_{28}	—	August 14, 2007	San Marcello	San Marcello	·	2.4 km	MPC · JPL
631546	2007 PA_{33}	—	November 8, 2010	Mount Lemmon	Mount Lemmon Survey	L4	6.2 km	MPC · JPL
631547	2007 PU_{49}	—	August 10, 2007	Kitt Peak	Spacewatch	·	1.6 km	MPC · JPL
631548	2007 PJ_{51}	—	August 10, 2007	Kitt Peak	Spacewatch	·	1.6 km	MPC · JPL
631549	2007 PV_{51}	—	November 6, 2008	Kitt Peak	Spacewatch	·	1.8 km	MPC · JPL
631550	2007 PJ_{52}	—	August 10, 2007	Kitt Peak	Spacewatch	·	1.6 km	MPC · JPL
631551	2007 PH_{53}	—	October 25, 2008	Kitt Peak	Spacewatch	·	1.8 km	MPC · JPL
631552	2007 PZ_{53}	—	August 10, 2007	Kitt Peak	Spacewatch	·	1.4 km	MPC · JPL
631553	2007 PT_{54}	—	August 10, 2007	Kitt Peak	Spacewatch	·	930 m	MPC · JPL
631554	2007 QU_{2}	—	August 22, 2007	Eskridge	G. Hug	·	1.7 km	MPC · JPL
631555	2007 QL_{3}	—	August 18, 2007	Gaisberg	Gierlinger, R.	·	1.9 km	MPC · JPL
631556	2007 QM_{19}	—	August 23, 2007	Kitt Peak	Spacewatch	·	2.1 km	MPC · JPL
631557	2007 RW_{1}	—	September 1, 2007	Siding Spring	K. Sárneczky, L. Kiss	·	2.5 km	MPC · JPL
631558	2007 RS_{5}	—	September 5, 2007	Dauban	C. Rinner, Kugel, F.	EOS	2.0 km	MPC · JPL
631559	2007 RZ_{13}	—	September 10, 2007	Mount Lemmon	Mount Lemmon Survey	·	2.5 km	MPC · JPL
631560	2007 RQ_{14}	—	September 11, 2007	Remanzacco	Remanzacco	·	1.2 km	MPC · JPL
631561	2007 RP_{18}	—	May 7, 2006	Mount Lemmon	Mount Lemmon Survey	·	2.9 km	MPC · JPL
631562	2007 RF_{25}	—	September 4, 2007	Mount Lemmon	Mount Lemmon Survey	·	1.9 km	MPC · JPL
631563	2007 RO_{26}	—	September 4, 2007	Mount Lemmon	Mount Lemmon Survey	·	2.9 km	MPC · JPL
631564	2007 RF_{44}	—	September 9, 2007	Kitt Peak	Spacewatch	·	2.3 km	MPC · JPL
631565	2007 RC_{50}	—	September 9, 2007	Mount Lemmon	Mount Lemmon Survey	·	1.6 km	MPC · JPL
631566	2007 RT_{50}	—	November 20, 2003	Kitt Peak	Spacewatch	·	1.4 km	MPC · JPL
631567	2007 RK_{53}	—	September 9, 2007	Kitt Peak	Spacewatch	·	580 m	MPC · JPL
631568	2007 RT_{56}	—	September 9, 2007	Kitt Peak	Spacewatch	·	1.6 km	MPC · JPL
631569	2007 RX_{58}	—	September 10, 2007	Kitt Peak	Spacewatch	·	2.4 km	MPC · JPL
631570	2007 RB_{64}	—	February 2, 2001	Kitt Peak	Spacewatch	L4	7.7 km	MPC · JPL
631571	2007 RX_{70}	—	September 10, 2007	Kitt Peak	Spacewatch	·	1.3 km	MPC · JPL
631572	2007 RG_{71}	—	September 10, 2007	Kitt Peak	Spacewatch	EUN	1.1 km	MPC · JPL
631573	2007 RV_{75}	—	May 24, 2006	Kitt Peak	Spacewatch	THM	2.2 km	MPC · JPL
631574	2007 RO_{80}	—	September 10, 2007	Mount Lemmon	Mount Lemmon Survey	EOS	1.4 km	MPC · JPL
631575	2007 RD_{82}	—	January 31, 2006	Kitt Peak	Spacewatch	·	790 m	MPC · JPL
631576	2007 RN_{90}	—	September 10, 2007	Mount Lemmon	Mount Lemmon Survey	·	1.2 km	MPC · JPL
631577	2007 RV_{90}	—	September 10, 2007	Mount Lemmon	Mount Lemmon Survey	·	2.9 km	MPC · JPL
631578	2007 RN_{100}	—	September 11, 2007	Mount Lemmon	Mount Lemmon Survey	·	770 m	MPC · JPL
631579	2007 RP_{105}	—	September 11, 2007	Mount Lemmon	Mount Lemmon Survey	·	1.9 km	MPC · JPL
631580	2007 RU_{108}	—	September 11, 2007	Kitt Peak	Spacewatch	·	2.4 km	MPC · JPL
631581	2007 RK_{110}	—	September 11, 2007	Mount Lemmon	Mount Lemmon Survey	EOS	2.1 km	MPC · JPL
631582	2007 RM_{110}	—	September 11, 2007	Mount Lemmon	Mount Lemmon Survey	·	490 m	MPC · JPL
631583	2007 RD_{127}	—	October 4, 2003	Kitt Peak	Spacewatch	·	1.4 km	MPC · JPL
631584	2007 RO_{127}	—	February 27, 2006	Mount Lemmon	Mount Lemmon Survey	NYS	1.2 km	MPC · JPL
631585	2007 RV_{127}	—	September 12, 2007	Mount Lemmon	Mount Lemmon Survey	·	1.8 km	MPC · JPL
631586	2007 RS_{128}	—	September 12, 2007	Mount Lemmon	Mount Lemmon Survey	·	1.7 km	MPC · JPL
631587	2007 RO_{135}	—	September 13, 2007	Kitt Peak	Spacewatch	·	2.1 km	MPC · JPL
631588	2007 RU_{135}	—	September 13, 2007	Bergisch Gladbach	W. Bickel	EOS	1.9 km	MPC · JPL
631589	2007 RA_{144}	—	November 5, 2004	Palomar	NEAT	·	650 m	MPC · JPL
631590	2007 RJ_{147}	—	September 11, 2007	XuYi	PMO NEO Survey Program	·	1.5 km	MPC · JPL
631591	2007 RA_{150}	—	September 8, 2007	Bergisch Gladbach	W. Bickel	·	2.0 km	MPC · JPL
631592	2007 RE_{159}	—	August 24, 2007	Kitt Peak	Spacewatch	·	2.0 km	MPC · JPL
631593	2007 RQ_{159}	—	August 24, 2007	Kitt Peak	Spacewatch	AGN	1.6 km	MPC · JPL
631594	2007 RA_{160}	—	September 12, 2007	Mount Lemmon	Mount Lemmon Survey	·	1.3 km	MPC · JPL
631595	2007 RF_{161}	—	September 13, 2007	Mount Lemmon	Mount Lemmon Survey	·	1.4 km	MPC · JPL
631596	2007 RT_{164}	—	July 18, 2007	Mount Lemmon	Mount Lemmon Survey	·	1.5 km	MPC · JPL
631597	2007 RU_{164}	—	September 10, 2007	Kitt Peak	Spacewatch	·	3.2 km	MPC · JPL
631598	2007 RN_{170}	—	September 10, 2007	Kitt Peak	Spacewatch	·	640 m	MPC · JPL
631599	2007 RH_{177}	—	September 10, 2007	Mount Lemmon	Mount Lemmon Survey	·	2.3 km	MPC · JPL
631600	2007 RX_{184}	—	August 1, 2000	Cerro Tololo	Deep Ecliptic Survey	·	780 m	MPC · JPL

== 631601–631700 ==
back to top

Designation			Discovery			Properties		Ref
Permanent	Provisional	Named after	Date	Site	Discoverer(s)	Category	Diam.	Ref
631601	2007 RO_{191}	—	September 11, 2007	Kitt Peak	Spacewatch	THM	2.1 km	MPC · JPL
631602	2007 RN_{194}	—	April 1, 2005	Kitt Peak	Spacewatch	·	2.9 km	MPC · JPL
631603	2007 RO_{194}	—	September 12, 2007	Kitt Peak	Spacewatch	·	1.6 km	MPC · JPL
631604	2007 RH_{195}	—	September 12, 2007	Kitt Peak	Spacewatch	HYG	2.7 km	MPC · JPL
631605	2007 RD_{199}	—	September 13, 2007	Kitt Peak	Spacewatch	KON	2.2 km	MPC · JPL
631606	2007 RU_{203}	—	March 16, 2005	Mount Lemmon	Mount Lemmon Survey	·	3.0 km	MPC · JPL
631607	2007 RO_{208}	—	September 10, 2007	Kitt Peak	Spacewatch	EOS	1.6 km	MPC · JPL
631608	2007 RC_{214}	—	September 18, 2003	Kitt Peak	Spacewatch	·	1.7 km	MPC · JPL
631609	2007 RM_{214}	—	September 12, 2007	Kitt Peak	Spacewatch	MAR	820 m	MPC · JPL
631610	2007 RT_{219}	—	September 14, 2007	Catalina	CSS	EOS	2.2 km	MPC · JPL
631611	2007 RH_{225}	—	September 10, 2007	Kitt Peak	Spacewatch	·	3.0 km	MPC · JPL
631612	2007 RR_{228}	—	September 11, 2007	Mount Lemmon	Mount Lemmon Survey	·	1.5 km	MPC · JPL
631613	2007 RT_{231}	—	September 11, 2007	Mount Lemmon	Mount Lemmon Survey	·	1.5 km	MPC · JPL
631614	2007 RT_{248}	—	September 13, 2007	Mount Lemmon	Mount Lemmon Survey	·	2.5 km	MPC · JPL
631615	2007 RM_{251}	—	September 13, 2007	Kitt Peak	Spacewatch	·	2.4 km	MPC · JPL
631616	2007 RA_{254}	—	March 5, 2006	Anderson Mesa	LONEOS	V	830 m	MPC · JPL
631617	2007 RP_{254}	—	March 3, 2005	Catalina	CSS	·	3.4 km	MPC · JPL
631618	2007 RA_{261}	—	September 14, 2007	Kitt Peak	Spacewatch	·	2.7 km	MPC · JPL
631619	2007 RV_{266}	—	September 15, 2007	Mount Lemmon	Mount Lemmon Survey	·	930 m	MPC · JPL
631620	2007 RK_{274}	—	September 5, 2007	Mauna Kea	D. D. Balam, K. M. Perrett	·	2.0 km	MPC · JPL
631621	2007 RZ_{277}	—	April 12, 2002	Palomar	NEAT	EUN	1.5 km	MPC · JPL
631622	2007 RA_{317}	—	September 10, 2007	Mount Lemmon	Mount Lemmon Survey	EOS	1.9 km	MPC · JPL
631623	2007 RM_{318}	—	September 11, 2007	Kitt Peak	Spacewatch	·	590 m	MPC · JPL
631624	2007 RV_{320}	—	September 15, 2007	Kitt Peak	Spacewatch	·	2.7 km	MPC · JPL
631625	2007 RS_{327}	—	September 11, 2007	Mount Lemmon	Mount Lemmon Survey	·	3.0 km	MPC · JPL
631626 Benedektibor	2007 RP_{329}	Benedektibor	March 28, 2003	Piszkéstető	K. Sárneczky	L4	8.7 km	MPC · JPL
631627	2007 RY_{332}	—	September 10, 2007	Kitt Peak	Spacewatch	MAS	740 m	MPC · JPL
631628	2007 RD_{333}	—	August 14, 2012	Haleakala	Pan-STARRS 1	·	2.6 km	MPC · JPL
631629	2007 RN_{333}	—	May 6, 2011	Mount Lemmon	Mount Lemmon Survey	·	2.8 km	MPC · JPL
631630	2007 RP_{333}	—	August 12, 2007	XuYi	PMO NEO Survey Program	·	1.1 km	MPC · JPL
631631	2007 RT_{333}	—	January 29, 2009	Mount Lemmon	Mount Lemmon Survey	·	1.0 km	MPC · JPL
631632	2007 RM_{334}	—	September 12, 2007	Mount Lemmon	Mount Lemmon Survey	·	1.4 km	MPC · JPL
631633	2007 RQ_{334}	—	November 11, 2013	Mount Lemmon	Mount Lemmon Survey	·	2.4 km	MPC · JPL
631634	2007 RT_{334}	—	January 26, 2015	Haleakala	Pan-STARRS 1	EOS	1.5 km	MPC · JPL
631635	2007 RR_{336}	—	September 13, 2007	Kitt Peak	Spacewatch	·	1.4 km	MPC · JPL
631636	2007 RE_{339}	—	December 4, 2008	Kitt Peak	Spacewatch	·	2.3 km	MPC · JPL
631637	2007 RA_{340}	—	September 14, 2007	Mount Lemmon	Mount Lemmon Survey	·	2.5 km	MPC · JPL
631638	2007 RB_{340}	—	September 14, 2007	Catalina	CSS	·	1.2 km	MPC · JPL
631639	2007 RF_{340}	—	July 24, 2015	Haleakala	Pan-STARRS 1	·	1.2 km	MPC · JPL
631640	2007 RQ_{341}	—	November 28, 2013	Mount Lemmon	Mount Lemmon Survey	·	1.8 km	MPC · JPL
631641	2007 RM_{342}	—	May 21, 2011	Mount Lemmon	Mount Lemmon Survey	·	2.1 km	MPC · JPL
631642	2007 RD_{344}	—	November 1, 2008	Mount Lemmon	Mount Lemmon Survey	EOS	1.4 km	MPC · JPL
631643	2007 RV_{351}	—	September 14, 2007	Mount Lemmon	Mount Lemmon Survey	·	1.7 km	MPC · JPL
631644	2007 RJ_{353}	—	September 13, 2007	Mount Lemmon	Mount Lemmon Survey	·	1.6 km	MPC · JPL
631645	2007 RN_{354}	—	September 11, 2007	Mount Lemmon	Mount Lemmon Survey	·	2.6 km	MPC · JPL
631646	2007 RU_{354}	—	September 14, 2007	Mount Lemmon	Mount Lemmon Survey	TEL	930 m	MPC · JPL
631647	2007 RY_{358}	—	September 12, 2007	Mount Lemmon	Mount Lemmon Survey	·	2.3 km	MPC · JPL
631648	2007 RH_{364}	—	September 13, 2007	Mount Lemmon	Mount Lemmon Survey	·	1.3 km	MPC · JPL
631649	2007 RX_{367}	—	September 10, 2007	Kitt Peak	Spacewatch	·	1.5 km	MPC · JPL
631650	2007 RE_{375}	—	September 12, 2007	Mount Lemmon	Mount Lemmon Survey	·	2.0 km	MPC · JPL
631651	2007 SK_{8}	—	September 18, 2007	Kitt Peak	Spacewatch	·	750 m	MPC · JPL
631652	2007 SR_{8}	—	September 18, 2007	Kitt Peak	Spacewatch	·	2.2 km	MPC · JPL
631653	2007 SU_{12}	—	September 19, 2007	Kitt Peak	Spacewatch	·	2.5 km	MPC · JPL
631654	2007 SU_{14}	—	October 3, 2003	Kitt Peak	Spacewatch	·	1.7 km	MPC · JPL
631655	2007 SJ_{26}	—	September 9, 2007	Kitt Peak	Spacewatch	·	2.0 km	MPC · JPL
631656	2007 ST_{29}	—	September 13, 2007	Mount Lemmon	Mount Lemmon Survey	·	1.4 km	MPC · JPL
631657	2007 TX_{1}	—	March 16, 2005	Mount Lemmon	Mount Lemmon Survey	·	1.9 km	MPC · JPL
631658	2007 TH_{2}	—	February 27, 2006	Kitt Peak	Spacewatch	·	760 m	MPC · JPL
631659	2007 TL_{6}	—	September 11, 2007	Catalina	CSS	·	3.6 km	MPC · JPL
631660	2007 TQ_{20}	—	October 7, 2007	Mount Lemmon	Mount Lemmon Survey	EUN	1.3 km	MPC · JPL
631661	2007 TQ_{21}	—	November 1, 2002	Palomar	NEAT	EOS	2.3 km	MPC · JPL
631662	2007 TU_{29}	—	October 4, 2007	Kitt Peak	Spacewatch	·	2.8 km	MPC · JPL
631663	2007 TA_{36}	—	October 10, 2007	Kitt Peak	Spacewatch	·	2.5 km	MPC · JPL
631664	2007 TB_{37}	—	September 4, 2007	Mount Lemmon	Mount Lemmon Survey	MAS	640 m	MPC · JPL
631665	2007 TC_{54}	—	October 4, 2007	Kitt Peak	Spacewatch	·	2.2 km	MPC · JPL
631666	2007 TJ_{57}	—	October 4, 2007	Kitt Peak	Spacewatch	·	3.1 km	MPC · JPL
631667	2007 TC_{88}	—	October 8, 2007	Mount Lemmon	Mount Lemmon Survey	KOR	1.6 km	MPC · JPL
631668	2007 TG_{90}	—	October 8, 2007	Mount Lemmon	Mount Lemmon Survey	·	2.4 km	MPC · JPL
631669	2007 TS_{91}	—	October 4, 2007	Kitt Peak	Spacewatch	·	1.8 km	MPC · JPL
631670	2007 TH_{93}	—	October 6, 2007	Kitt Peak	Spacewatch	·	3.1 km	MPC · JPL
631671	2007 TV_{101}	—	October 8, 2007	Mount Lemmon	Mount Lemmon Survey	·	2.7 km	MPC · JPL
631672	2007 TU_{110}	—	September 10, 2007	Mount Lemmon	Mount Lemmon Survey	·	2.3 km	MPC · JPL
631673	2007 TX_{110}	—	August 23, 2007	Kitt Peak	Spacewatch	·	2.7 km	MPC · JPL
631674	2007 TA_{116}	—	October 8, 2007	Mount Lemmon	Mount Lemmon Survey	·	1.1 km	MPC · JPL
631675	2007 TF_{117}	—	October 9, 2007	Kitt Peak	Spacewatch	·	2.4 km	MPC · JPL
631676	2007 TV_{117}	—	May 23, 2001	Cerro Tololo	Deep Ecliptic Survey	HYG	2.2 km	MPC · JPL
631677	2007 TG_{133}	—	October 7, 2007	Mount Lemmon	Mount Lemmon Survey	·	2.8 km	MPC · JPL
631678	2007 TT_{142}	—	October 14, 2007	Dauban	Kugel, C. R. F.	·	2.8 km	MPC · JPL
631679	2007 TH_{166}	—	October 10, 2007	Catalina	CSS	·	3.3 km	MPC · JPL
631680	2007 TF_{168}	—	October 9, 2007	Črni Vrh	Matičič, S.	·	2.9 km	MPC · JPL
631681	2007 TY_{175}	—	May 8, 2006	Mount Lemmon	Mount Lemmon Survey	THM	2.2 km	MPC · JPL
631682	2007 TN_{188}	—	March 17, 2005	Kitt Peak	Spacewatch	·	3.1 km	MPC · JPL
631683	2007 TH_{189}	—	October 4, 2007	Mount Lemmon	Mount Lemmon Survey	·	710 m	MPC · JPL
631684	2007 TL_{192}	—	February 14, 2004	Palomar	NEAT	EOS	2.3 km	MPC · JPL
631685	2007 TY_{205}	—	February 17, 2015	Haleakala	Pan-STARRS 1	VER	2.2 km	MPC · JPL
631686	2007 TV_{207}	—	September 11, 2007	Mount Lemmon	Mount Lemmon Survey	·	2.3 km	MPC · JPL
631687	2007 TO_{212}	—	September 25, 2007	Mount Lemmon	Mount Lemmon Survey	·	2.5 km	MPC · JPL
631688	2007 TF_{227}	—	October 8, 2007	Kitt Peak	Spacewatch	·	2.8 km	MPC · JPL
631689	2007 TW_{229}	—	October 8, 2007	Kitt Peak	Spacewatch	KOR	1.4 km	MPC · JPL
631690	2007 TC_{236}	—	October 9, 2007	Mount Lemmon	Mount Lemmon Survey	·	2.9 km	MPC · JPL
631691	2007 TF_{238}	—	October 10, 2007	Kitt Peak	Spacewatch	·	1.2 km	MPC · JPL
631692	2007 TB_{251}	—	October 11, 2007	Mount Lemmon	Mount Lemmon Survey	EOS	2.0 km	MPC · JPL
631693	2007 TS_{252}	—	September 11, 2007	Mount Lemmon	Mount Lemmon Survey	·	1.7 km	MPC · JPL
631694	2007 TN_{253}	—	October 8, 2007	Mount Lemmon	Mount Lemmon Survey	·	1.1 km	MPC · JPL
631695	2007 TS_{256}	—	October 10, 2007	Kitt Peak	Spacewatch	·	1.7 km	MPC · JPL
631696	2007 TD_{259}	—	September 14, 2007	Mount Lemmon	Mount Lemmon Survey	·	2.7 km	MPC · JPL
631697	2007 TH_{259}	—	October 10, 2007	Mount Lemmon	Mount Lemmon Survey	·	2.8 km	MPC · JPL
631698	2007 TV_{260}	—	October 6, 2007	Kitt Peak	Spacewatch	THM	2.3 km	MPC · JPL
631699	2007 TO_{263}	—	October 11, 2007	Kitt Peak	Spacewatch	EOS	1.9 km	MPC · JPL
631700	2007 TZ_{263}	—	October 11, 2007	Kitt Peak	Spacewatch	EOS	1.5 km	MPC · JPL

== 631701–631800 ==
back to top

Designation			Discovery			Properties		Ref
Permanent	Provisional	Named after	Date	Site	Discoverer(s)	Category	Diam.	Ref
631701	2007 TL_{265}	—	October 11, 2007	Kitt Peak	Spacewatch	·	2.4 km	MPC · JPL
631702	2007 TT_{267}	—	October 9, 2007	Kitt Peak	Spacewatch	TIR	2.6 km	MPC · JPL
631703	2007 TE_{272}	—	October 9, 2007	Kitt Peak	Spacewatch	·	800 m	MPC · JPL
631704	2007 TL_{277}	—	October 11, 2007	Mount Lemmon	Mount Lemmon Survey	TIR	2.7 km	MPC · JPL
631705	2007 TD_{279}	—	October 3, 1999	Kitt Peak	Spacewatch	·	970 m	MPC · JPL
631706	2007 TA_{296}	—	October 10, 2007	Mount Lemmon	Mount Lemmon Survey	·	2.5 km	MPC · JPL
631707	2007 TY_{297}	—	October 11, 2007	Mount Lemmon	Mount Lemmon Survey	·	3.0 km	MPC · JPL
631708	2007 TH_{304}	—	October 12, 2007	Mount Lemmon	Mount Lemmon Survey	·	2.3 km	MPC · JPL
631709	2007 TD_{308}	—	September 14, 2007	Mount Lemmon	Mount Lemmon Survey	·	2.5 km	MPC · JPL
631710	2007 TP_{311}	—	September 14, 2007	Mount Lemmon	Mount Lemmon Survey	·	2.8 km	MPC · JPL
631711	2007 TW_{312}	—	October 11, 2007	Mount Lemmon	Mount Lemmon Survey	EMA	2.3 km	MPC · JPL
631712	2007 TN_{314}	—	October 11, 2007	Mount Lemmon	Mount Lemmon Survey	·	1.0 km	MPC · JPL
631713	2007 TS_{324}	—	October 11, 2007	Kitt Peak	Spacewatch	·	2.1 km	MPC · JPL
631714	2007 TV_{327}	—	October 11, 2007	Kitt Peak	Spacewatch	·	2.9 km	MPC · JPL
631715	2007 TN_{336}	—	September 15, 2007	Mount Lemmon	Mount Lemmon Survey	·	1.6 km	MPC · JPL
631716	2007 TU_{336}	—	February 2, 2006	Kitt Peak	Spacewatch	·	840 m	MPC · JPL
631717	2007 TX_{338}	—	October 15, 2007	Kitt Peak	Spacewatch	EOS	1.8 km	MPC · JPL
631718	2007 TH_{339}	—	September 11, 2007	Mount Lemmon	Mount Lemmon Survey	·	1.9 km	MPC · JPL
631719	2007 TK_{340}	—	September 20, 2007	Kitt Peak	Spacewatch	·	1.9 km	MPC · JPL
631720	2007 TP_{342}	—	February 4, 2000	Kitt Peak	Spacewatch	·	1.6 km	MPC · JPL
631721	2007 TR_{349}	—	October 15, 2007	Mount Lemmon	Mount Lemmon Survey	·	3.9 km	MPC · JPL
631722	2007 TQ_{359}	—	March 10, 2005	Mount Lemmon	Mount Lemmon Survey	EOS	1.9 km	MPC · JPL
631723	2007 TZ_{366}	—	October 9, 2007	Kitt Peak	Spacewatch	·	2.5 km	MPC · JPL
631724	2007 TL_{370}	—	October 12, 2007	Mount Lemmon	Mount Lemmon Survey	·	2.1 km	MPC · JPL
631725	2007 TM_{371}	—	September 3, 2002	Palomar	NEAT	·	4.5 km	MPC · JPL
631726	2007 TN_{378}	—	October 12, 2007	Mount Lemmon	Mount Lemmon Survey	·	3.1 km	MPC · JPL
631727	2007 TR_{378}	—	October 12, 2007	Mount Lemmon	Mount Lemmon Survey	·	2.6 km	MPC · JPL
631728	2007 TT_{378}	—	September 12, 2007	Kitt Peak	Spacewatch	·	1.9 km	MPC · JPL
631729	2007 TY_{378}	—	July 24, 2003	Palomar	NEAT	NYS	1.1 km	MPC · JPL
631730	2007 TA_{380}	—	October 8, 2007	Catalina	CSS	·	2.8 km	MPC · JPL
631731	2007 TE_{384}	—	October 14, 2007	Mount Lemmon	Mount Lemmon Survey	·	2.5 km	MPC · JPL
631732	2007 TY_{393}	—	September 15, 2007	Mount Lemmon	Mount Lemmon Survey	·	2.3 km	MPC · JPL
631733	2007 TV_{396}	—	October 15, 2007	Kitt Peak	Spacewatch	EOS	2.1 km	MPC · JPL
631734	2007 TD_{397}	—	January 31, 2004	Apache Point	SDSS	·	4.1 km	MPC · JPL
631735	2007 TS_{401}	—	October 15, 2007	Mount Lemmon	Mount Lemmon Survey	·	960 m	MPC · JPL
631736	2007 TU_{401}	—	October 15, 2007	Mount Lemmon	Mount Lemmon Survey	·	2.1 km	MPC · JPL
631737	2007 TS_{402}	—	October 15, 2007	Mount Lemmon	Mount Lemmon Survey	·	1.5 km	MPC · JPL
631738	2007 TX_{404}	—	August 25, 2001	Kitt Peak	Spacewatch	·	2.2 km	MPC · JPL
631739	2007 TP_{408}	—	October 15, 2007	Kitt Peak	Spacewatch	·	870 m	MPC · JPL
631740	2007 TX_{409}	—	October 15, 2007	Altschwendt	W. Ries	·	1.6 km	MPC · JPL
631741	2007 TU_{413}	—	February 29, 2004	Kitt Peak	Spacewatch	·	3.5 km	MPC · JPL
631742	2007 TG_{420}	—	October 9, 2007	Catalina	CSS	·	2.9 km	MPC · JPL
631743	2007 TT_{421}	—	May 6, 2006	Kitt Peak	Spacewatch	·	3.2 km	MPC · JPL
631744	2007 TZ_{434}	—	March 15, 2004	Kitt Peak	Spacewatch	·	2.3 km	MPC · JPL
631745	2007 TN_{437}	—	December 20, 2004	Mount Lemmon	Mount Lemmon Survey	·	1.5 km	MPC · JPL
631746	2007 TO_{438}	—	October 10, 2007	Kitt Peak	Spacewatch	·	2.2 km	MPC · JPL
631747	2007 TQ_{438}	—	October 10, 2007	Kitt Peak	Spacewatch	EOS	1.8 km	MPC · JPL
631748	2007 TG_{439}	—	October 12, 2007	Mount Lemmon	Mount Lemmon Survey	EOS	2.3 km	MPC · JPL
631749	2007 TE_{442}	—	October 10, 2007	Catalina	CSS	·	3.1 km	MPC · JPL
631750	2007 TH_{452}	—	September 10, 2007	Mount Lemmon	Mount Lemmon Survey	·	2.2 km	MPC · JPL
631751	2007 TP_{453}	—	September 30, 2002	Haleakala	NEAT	BRA	2.4 km	MPC · JPL
631752	2007 TQ_{454}	—	September 9, 2007	Kitt Peak	Spacewatch	·	2.2 km	MPC · JPL
631753	2007 TY_{454}	—	October 9, 2007	Kitt Peak	Spacewatch	L4	8.9 km	MPC · JPL
631754	2007 TP_{456}	—	August 24, 2007	Kitt Peak	Spacewatch	·	2.8 km	MPC · JPL
631755	2007 TC_{460}	—	October 12, 2007	Mount Lemmon	Mount Lemmon Survey	EOS	1.8 km	MPC · JPL
631756	2007 TJ_{460}	—	September 8, 2011	Kitt Peak	Spacewatch	EUN	1.1 km	MPC · JPL
631757	2007 TX_{460}	—	October 12, 2007	Kitt Peak	Spacewatch	·	610 m	MPC · JPL
631758	2007 TW_{461}	—	October 9, 2007	Kitt Peak	Spacewatch	·	2.0 km	MPC · JPL
631759	2007 TQ_{462}	—	October 8, 2007	Kitt Peak	Spacewatch	EUN	1.0 km	MPC · JPL
631760	2007 TA_{466}	—	March 11, 2011	Mount Lemmon	Mount Lemmon Survey	·	1.9 km	MPC · JPL
631761	2007 TC_{466}	—	April 9, 2010	Mount Lemmon	Mount Lemmon Survey	EOS	1.8 km	MPC · JPL
631762	2007 TH_{466}	—	October 9, 2007	Kitt Peak	Spacewatch	·	2.7 km	MPC · JPL
631763	2007 TO_{466}	—	February 18, 2010	Mount Lemmon	Mount Lemmon Survey	·	2.9 km	MPC · JPL
631764	2007 TP_{466}	—	August 10, 2007	Kitt Peak	Spacewatch	·	2.1 km	MPC · JPL
631765	2007 TW_{466}	—	February 18, 2015	Mount Lemmon	Mount Lemmon Survey	EOS	1.9 km	MPC · JPL
631766	2007 TX_{466}	—	October 8, 2007	Kitt Peak	Spacewatch	·	2.5 km	MPC · JPL
631767	2007 TB_{467}	—	November 2, 2013	Mount Lemmon	Mount Lemmon Survey	·	1.9 km	MPC · JPL
631768	2007 TH_{467}	—	October 10, 2007	Catalina	CSS	·	2.4 km	MPC · JPL
631769	2007 TB_{469}	—	May 6, 2011	Mount Lemmon	Mount Lemmon Survey	EOS	1.5 km	MPC · JPL
631770	2007 TF_{469}	—	May 21, 2014	Haleakala	Pan-STARRS 1	·	900 m	MPC · JPL
631771	2007 TE_{471}	—	October 4, 2007	Mount Lemmon	Mount Lemmon Survey	·	1.8 km	MPC · JPL
631772	2007 TV_{473}	—	October 13, 2007	Mount Lemmon	Mount Lemmon Survey	·	1.7 km	MPC · JPL
631773	2007 TJ_{474}	—	October 4, 2007	Kitt Peak	Spacewatch	·	1.9 km	MPC · JPL
631774	2007 TM_{474}	—	January 23, 2015	Haleakala	Pan-STARRS 1	·	1.7 km	MPC · JPL
631775	2007 TO_{477}	—	December 30, 2008	Mount Lemmon	Mount Lemmon Survey	VER	2.1 km	MPC · JPL
631776	2007 TR_{477}	—	February 15, 2010	Kitt Peak	Spacewatch	·	1.8 km	MPC · JPL
631777	2007 TU_{477}	—	October 12, 1996	Kitt Peak	Spacewatch	·	2.0 km	MPC · JPL
631778	2007 TT_{480}	—	October 13, 2007	Mount Lemmon	Mount Lemmon Survey	EOS	1.7 km	MPC · JPL
631779	2007 TX_{480}	—	October 10, 2007	Kitt Peak	Spacewatch	·	2.4 km	MPC · JPL
631780	2007 TS_{483}	—	October 15, 2007	Mount Lemmon	Mount Lemmon Survey	VER	2.4 km	MPC · JPL
631781	2007 TF_{485}	—	October 12, 2007	Kitt Peak	Spacewatch	·	2.1 km	MPC · JPL
631782	2007 TM_{485}	—	October 15, 2007	Kitt Peak	Spacewatch	·	2.2 km	MPC · JPL
631783	2007 TZ_{485}	—	October 9, 2007	Kitt Peak	Spacewatch	·	2.0 km	MPC · JPL
631784	2007 TS_{490}	—	October 9, 2007	Mount Lemmon	Mount Lemmon Survey	·	830 m	MPC · JPL
631785	2007 UO_{5}	—	October 11, 2007	Kitt Peak	Spacewatch	THM	2.2 km	MPC · JPL
631786	2007 UF_{23}	—	October 8, 2007	Mount Lemmon	Mount Lemmon Survey	·	2.9 km	MPC · JPL
631787	2007 UW_{26}	—	October 16, 2007	Mount Lemmon	Mount Lemmon Survey	3:2 · SHU	4.8 km	MPC · JPL
631788	2007 UO_{27}	—	March 3, 2005	Catalina	CSS	EUN	1.3 km	MPC · JPL
631789	2007 UU_{27}	—	October 16, 2007	Mount Lemmon	Mount Lemmon Survey	·	3.0 km	MPC · JPL
631790	2007 UT_{30}	—	October 19, 2007	Catalina	CSS	·	2.8 km	MPC · JPL
631791	2007 UB_{32}	—	October 19, 2007	Mount Lemmon	Mount Lemmon Survey	·	3.0 km	MPC · JPL
631792	2007 UD_{40}	—	May 8, 2005	Kitt Peak	Spacewatch	·	3.3 km	MPC · JPL
631793	2007 UF_{40}	—	October 20, 2007	Mount Lemmon	Mount Lemmon Survey	·	2.2 km	MPC · JPL
631794	2007 UE_{43}	—	October 6, 2007	Kitt Peak	Spacewatch	·	900 m	MPC · JPL
631795	2007 UM_{45}	—	October 19, 2007	Kitt Peak	Spacewatch	·	3.3 km	MPC · JPL
631796	2007 UJ_{50}	—	October 24, 2007	Mount Lemmon	Mount Lemmon Survey	·	1.8 km	MPC · JPL
631797	2007 UE_{53}	—	October 30, 2007	Kitt Peak	Spacewatch	·	990 m	MPC · JPL
631798	2007 UR_{59}	—	October 30, 2007	Mount Lemmon	Mount Lemmon Survey	·	1.2 km	MPC · JPL
631799	2007 UG_{61}	—	October 8, 2007	Kitt Peak	Spacewatch	·	2.7 km	MPC · JPL
631800	2007 UP_{61}	—	May 4, 2005	Mount Lemmon	Mount Lemmon Survey	·	3.1 km	MPC · JPL

== 631801–631900 ==
back to top

Designation			Discovery			Properties		Ref
Permanent	Provisional	Named after	Date	Site	Discoverer(s)	Category	Diam.	Ref
631801	2007 UR_{61}	—	March 12, 2005	Kitt Peak	Deep Ecliptic Survey	EOS	1.9 km	MPC · JPL
631802	2007 UQ_{63}	—	October 30, 2007	Mount Lemmon	Mount Lemmon Survey	·	2.1 km	MPC · JPL
631803	2007 US_{68}	—	October 30, 2007	Mount Lemmon	Mount Lemmon Survey	·	500 m	MPC · JPL
631804	2007 UW_{68}	—	October 30, 2007	Mount Lemmon	Mount Lemmon Survey	·	2.2 km	MPC · JPL
631805	2007 UX_{70}	—	October 30, 2007	Mount Lemmon	Mount Lemmon Survey	·	860 m	MPC · JPL
631806	2007 UT_{72}	—	October 9, 2007	Kitt Peak	Spacewatch	·	2.6 km	MPC · JPL
631807	2007 UL_{75}	—	October 31, 2007	Mount Lemmon	Mount Lemmon Survey	·	1.1 km	MPC · JPL
631808	2007 UG_{76}	—	October 11, 2007	Kitt Peak	Spacewatch	·	2.3 km	MPC · JPL
631809	2007 UF_{77}	—	June 27, 2005	Mount Lemmon	Mount Lemmon Survey	·	3.2 km	MPC · JPL
631810	2007 UL_{81}	—	October 19, 2007	Mount Lemmon	Mount Lemmon Survey	EOS	2.0 km	MPC · JPL
631811	2007 UT_{91}	—	October 30, 2007	Mount Lemmon	Mount Lemmon Survey	(22805)	3.2 km	MPC · JPL
631812	2007 UK_{92}	—	October 21, 2007	Kitt Peak	Spacewatch	EOS	1.6 km	MPC · JPL
631813	2007 UK_{94}	—	October 31, 2007	Mount Lemmon	Mount Lemmon Survey	·	2.7 km	MPC · JPL
631814	2007 UD_{97}	—	September 9, 2007	Mount Lemmon	Mount Lemmon Survey	THM	1.9 km	MPC · JPL
631815	2007 UF_{107}	—	May 3, 2006	Mount Lemmon	Mount Lemmon Survey	·	700 m	MPC · JPL
631816	2007 UW_{108}	—	October 30, 2007	Kitt Peak	Spacewatch	EOS	1.5 km	MPC · JPL
631817	2007 UZ_{122}	—	October 7, 2007	Mount Lemmon	Mount Lemmon Survey	·	2.3 km	MPC · JPL
631818	2007 UY_{124}	—	November 29, 2013	Mount Lemmon	Mount Lemmon Survey	·	2.2 km	MPC · JPL
631819	2007 UN_{126}	—	October 19, 2007	Mount Lemmon	Mount Lemmon Survey	·	1.3 km	MPC · JPL
631820	2007 US_{129}	—	October 16, 2007	Kitt Peak	Spacewatch	·	770 m	MPC · JPL
631821	2007 UK_{131}	—	September 20, 2001	Kitt Peak	Spacewatch	·	2.1 km	MPC · JPL
631822	2007 UA_{138}	—	October 19, 2007	Kitt Peak	Spacewatch	·	2.1 km	MPC · JPL
631823	2007 UO_{142}	—	October 20, 2007	Mount Lemmon	Mount Lemmon Survey	·	400 m	MPC · JPL
631824	2007 UM_{144}	—	September 21, 2003	Kitt Peak	Spacewatch	·	1.2 km	MPC · JPL
631825	2007 UA_{146}	—	August 27, 2012	Haleakala	Pan-STARRS 1	·	2.8 km	MPC · JPL
631826	2007 UH_{146}	—	May 25, 2011	Kitt Peak	Spacewatch	·	1.9 km	MPC · JPL
631827	2007 UD_{148}	—	October 19, 2007	Kitt Peak	Spacewatch	·	900 m	MPC · JPL
631828	2007 UF_{148}	—	October 21, 2007	Mount Lemmon	Mount Lemmon Survey	·	2.7 km	MPC · JPL
631829	2007 UJ_{148}	—	February 11, 2015	Mount Lemmon	Mount Lemmon Survey	EOS	1.7 km	MPC · JPL
631830	2007 UQ_{148}	—	October 19, 2007	Kitt Peak	Spacewatch	·	600 m	MPC · JPL
631831	2007 UD_{149}	—	October 24, 2007	Mount Lemmon	Mount Lemmon Survey	·	2.8 km	MPC · JPL
631832	2007 UM_{149}	—	October 19, 2007	Catalina	CSS	·	2.4 km	MPC · JPL
631833	2007 UO_{149}	—	June 6, 2011	Mount Lemmon	Mount Lemmon Survey	EOS	1.5 km	MPC · JPL
631834	2007 US_{149}	—	October 16, 2007	Kitt Peak	Spacewatch	·	2.5 km	MPC · JPL
631835	2007 UF_{153}	—	April 25, 2014	Mount Lemmon	Mount Lemmon Survey	·	860 m	MPC · JPL
631836	2007 UY_{153}	—	July 5, 2006	Lulin	LUSS	·	3.3 km	MPC · JPL
631837	2007 UG_{155}	—	October 20, 2007	Kitt Peak	Spacewatch	EOS	1.6 km	MPC · JPL
631838	2007 UQ_{155}	—	October 16, 2007	Kitt Peak	Spacewatch	VER	2.6 km	MPC · JPL
631839	2007 UL_{159}	—	October 19, 2007	Kitt Peak	Spacewatch	·	1.9 km	MPC · JPL
631840	2007 UE_{161}	—	October 20, 2007	Mount Lemmon	Mount Lemmon Survey	·	2.1 km	MPC · JPL
631841	2007 UR_{161}	—	October 20, 2007	Mount Lemmon	Mount Lemmon Survey	·	1.8 km	MPC · JPL
631842	2007 UD_{162}	—	October 16, 2007	Mount Lemmon	Mount Lemmon Survey	·	2.3 km	MPC · JPL
631843	2007 UZ_{165}	—	October 20, 2007	Kitt Peak	Spacewatch	HYG	2.0 km	MPC · JPL
631844	2007 VE_{5}	—	November 3, 2007	Dauban	Kugel, C. R. F.	EOS	1.9 km	MPC · JPL
631845	2007 VF_{13}	—	November 1, 2007	Mount Lemmon	Mount Lemmon Survey	KOR	1.2 km	MPC · JPL
631846	2007 VJ_{14}	—	October 18, 2007	Kitt Peak	Spacewatch	THM	1.9 km	MPC · JPL
631847	2007 VH_{23}	—	November 2, 2007	Mount Lemmon	Mount Lemmon Survey	·	1.2 km	MPC · JPL
631848	2007 VT_{27}	—	October 8, 2007	Mount Lemmon	Mount Lemmon Survey	·	1.9 km	MPC · JPL
631849	2007 VD_{29}	—	November 3, 2007	Mount Lemmon	Mount Lemmon Survey	·	2.9 km	MPC · JPL
631850	2007 VR_{31}	—	November 2, 2007	Kitt Peak	Spacewatch	EOS	1.8 km	MPC · JPL
631851	2007 VR_{36}	—	November 2, 2007	Mount Lemmon	Mount Lemmon Survey	THM	1.9 km	MPC · JPL
631852	2007 VF_{42}	—	October 12, 2007	Mount Lemmon	Mount Lemmon Survey	·	1.1 km	MPC · JPL
631853	2007 VJ_{44}	—	November 1, 2007	Kitt Peak	Spacewatch	·	2.9 km	MPC · JPL
631854	2007 VC_{51}	—	November 1, 2007	Kitt Peak	Spacewatch	·	1.2 km	MPC · JPL
631855	2007 VD_{52}	—	November 1, 2007	Kitt Peak	Spacewatch	·	2.0 km	MPC · JPL
631856	2007 VQ_{52}	—	October 25, 2001	Apache Point	SDSS Collaboration	·	2.7 km	MPC · JPL
631857	2007 VU_{53}	—	November 1, 2007	Kitt Peak	Spacewatch	·	2.7 km	MPC · JPL
631858	2007 VW_{59}	—	November 2, 2007	Mount Lemmon	Mount Lemmon Survey	·	2.4 km	MPC · JPL
631859	2007 VR_{68}	—	March 8, 2005	Kitt Peak	Spacewatch	·	1.3 km	MPC · JPL
631860	2007 VB_{69}	—	August 28, 1995	Kitt Peak	Spacewatch	·	1.3 km	MPC · JPL
631861	2007 VK_{69}	—	November 4, 2007	Mount Lemmon	Mount Lemmon Survey	·	3.0 km	MPC · JPL
631862	2007 VE_{71}	—	November 4, 2007	Kitt Peak	Spacewatch	·	820 m	MPC · JPL
631863	2007 VK_{73}	—	November 2, 2007	Kitt Peak	Spacewatch	(11882)	1.8 km	MPC · JPL
631864	2007 VP_{74}	—	September 12, 2007	Mount Lemmon	Mount Lemmon Survey	·	1.8 km	MPC · JPL
631865	2007 VJ_{85}	—	November 24, 2003	Anderson Mesa	LONEOS	·	1.8 km	MPC · JPL
631866	2007 VK_{99}	—	November 2, 2007	Kitt Peak	Spacewatch	·	1.6 km	MPC · JPL
631867	2007 VQ_{102}	—	March 17, 2004	Kitt Peak	Spacewatch	·	3.6 km	MPC · JPL
631868	2007 VY_{104}	—	November 3, 2007	Kitt Peak	Spacewatch	·	1.2 km	MPC · JPL
631869	2007 VQ_{106}	—	November 3, 2007	Kitt Peak	Spacewatch	·	2.7 km	MPC · JPL
631870	2007 VF_{108}	—	August 3, 2002	Palomar	NEAT	·	1.6 km	MPC · JPL
631871	2007 VX_{113}	—	November 3, 2007	Kitt Peak	Spacewatch	·	2.3 km	MPC · JPL
631872	2007 VW_{128}	—	November 1, 2007	Mount Lemmon	Mount Lemmon Survey	EOS	1.4 km	MPC · JPL
631873	2007 VE_{130}	—	November 1, 2007	Mount Lemmon	Mount Lemmon Survey	KON	1.7 km	MPC · JPL
631874	2007 VB_{132}	—	November 5, 1996	Kitt Peak	Spacewatch	·	2.8 km	MPC · JPL
631875	2007 VD_{136}	—	October 16, 2007	Kitt Peak	Spacewatch	·	2.4 km	MPC · JPL
631876	2007 VK_{137}	—	November 5, 2007	Mount Lemmon	Mount Lemmon Survey	·	2.4 km	MPC · JPL
631877	2007 VA_{150}	—	November 7, 2007	Mount Lemmon	Mount Lemmon Survey	·	2.6 km	MPC · JPL
631878	2007 VY_{151}	—	November 2, 2007	Mount Lemmon	Mount Lemmon Survey	·	2.6 km	MPC · JPL
631879	2007 VF_{169}	—	November 12, 2001	Apache Point	SDSS Collaboration	·	3.7 km	MPC · JPL
631880	2007 VN_{171}	—	November 5, 2007	Kitt Peak	Spacewatch	·	2.4 km	MPC · JPL
631881	2007 VO_{176}	—	September 13, 2007	Mount Lemmon	Mount Lemmon Survey	·	1.5 km	MPC · JPL
631882	2007 VM_{178}	—	October 8, 2007	Kitt Peak	Spacewatch	EOS	1.9 km	MPC · JPL
631883	2007 VG_{182}	—	November 8, 2007	Mount Lemmon	Mount Lemmon Survey	·	2.2 km	MPC · JPL
631884	2007 VL_{195}	—	September 28, 2003	Kitt Peak	Spacewatch	·	1.4 km	MPC · JPL
631885	2007 VK_{197}	—	November 8, 2007	Kitt Peak	Spacewatch	·	1.6 km	MPC · JPL
631886	2007 VM_{200}	—	October 16, 2007	Kitt Peak	Spacewatch	·	2.2 km	MPC · JPL
631887	2007 VP_{200}	—	November 9, 2007	Mount Lemmon	Mount Lemmon Survey	·	2.2 km	MPC · JPL
631888	2007 VY_{203}	—	November 1, 2007	Kitt Peak	Spacewatch	·	2.3 km	MPC · JPL
631889	2007 VL_{208}	—	September 12, 2001	Kitt Peak	Spacewatch	THM	2.4 km	MPC · JPL
631890	2007 VM_{208}	—	November 11, 2007	Mount Lemmon	Mount Lemmon Survey	·	1.1 km	MPC · JPL
631891	2007 VJ_{214}	—	November 1, 2007	Kitt Peak	Spacewatch	·	2.4 km	MPC · JPL
631892	2007 VO_{217}	—	November 9, 2007	Kitt Peak	Spacewatch	·	990 m	MPC · JPL
631893	2007 VX_{219}	—	November 9, 2007	Kitt Peak	Spacewatch	·	1.9 km	MPC · JPL
631894	2007 VF_{221}	—	October 20, 2007	Mount Lemmon	Mount Lemmon Survey	·	650 m	MPC · JPL
631895	2007 VU_{222}	—	November 7, 2007	Mount Lemmon	Mount Lemmon Survey	EOS	1.6 km	MPC · JPL
631896	2007 VJ_{224}	—	November 8, 2007	Catalina	CSS	·	1.2 km	MPC · JPL
631897	2007 VZ_{224}	—	November 9, 2007	Mount Lemmon	Mount Lemmon Survey	EOS	1.8 km	MPC · JPL
631898	2007 VB_{226}	—	October 10, 2007	Kitt Peak	Spacewatch	·	2.1 km	MPC · JPL
631899	2007 VZ_{227}	—	October 12, 2007	Mount Lemmon	Mount Lemmon Survey	·	1.2 km	MPC · JPL
631900	2007 VC_{229}	—	November 7, 2007	Kitt Peak	Spacewatch	·	2.1 km	MPC · JPL

== 631901–632000 ==
back to top

Designation			Discovery			Properties		Ref
Permanent	Provisional	Named after	Date	Site	Discoverer(s)	Category	Diam.	Ref
631901	2007 VA_{232}	—	November 7, 2007	Kitt Peak	Spacewatch	·	2.8 km	MPC · JPL
631902	2007 VT_{234}	—	November 9, 2007	Kitt Peak	Spacewatch	EOS	1.8 km	MPC · JPL
631903	2007 VZ_{240}	—	August 11, 1997	Kitt Peak	Spacewatch	KOR	1.5 km	MPC · JPL
631904	2007 VD_{244}	—	October 20, 2007	Mount Lemmon	Mount Lemmon Survey	·	1.6 km	MPC · JPL
631905	2007 VS_{248}	—	November 14, 2007	Mount Lemmon	Mount Lemmon Survey	·	1.2 km	MPC · JPL
631906	2007 VJ_{258}	—	November 2, 2007	Mount Lemmon	Mount Lemmon Survey	VER	2.5 km	MPC · JPL
631907	2007 VO_{262}	—	November 13, 2007	Mount Lemmon	Mount Lemmon Survey	·	2.4 km	MPC · JPL
631908	2007 VV_{263}	—	February 14, 2005	La Silla	A. Boattini	·	3.3 km	MPC · JPL
631909	2007 VG_{264}	—	October 16, 2007	Mount Lemmon	Mount Lemmon Survey	·	2.7 km	MPC · JPL
631910	2007 VU_{273}	—	November 12, 2007	Mount Lemmon	Mount Lemmon Survey	VER	2.1 km	MPC · JPL
631911	2007 VN_{275}	—	November 5, 2007	Mount Lemmon	Mount Lemmon Survey	·	2.6 km	MPC · JPL
631912	2007 VN_{278}	—	November 7, 2007	Mount Lemmon	Mount Lemmon Survey	·	990 m	MPC · JPL
631913	2007 VT_{278}	—	October 14, 2007	Mount Lemmon	Mount Lemmon Survey	·	1.1 km	MPC · JPL
631914	2007 VH_{279}	—	November 14, 2007	Kitt Peak	Spacewatch	·	2.2 km	MPC · JPL
631915	2007 VO_{285}	—	November 14, 2007	Kitt Peak	Spacewatch	·	940 m	MPC · JPL
631916	2007 VO_{287}	—	November 2, 2007	Kitt Peak	Spacewatch	EOS	1.5 km	MPC · JPL
631917	2007 VE_{290}	—	November 14, 2007	Kitt Peak	Spacewatch	EUN	940 m	MPC · JPL
631918	2007 VD_{296}	—	November 2, 2007	Mount Lemmon	Mount Lemmon Survey	BRG	1.9 km	MPC · JPL
631919	2007 VK_{314}	—	November 2, 2007	Mount Lemmon	Mount Lemmon Survey	·	3.1 km	MPC · JPL
631920	2007 VS_{316}	—	October 21, 2003	Palomar	NEAT	·	1.3 km	MPC · JPL
631921	2007 VY_{322}	—	November 2, 2007	Mount Lemmon	Mount Lemmon Survey	·	3.8 km	MPC · JPL
631922	2007 VR_{324}	—	November 8, 2007	Kitt Peak	Spacewatch	PHO	990 m	MPC · JPL
631923	2007 VK_{336}	—	October 9, 2007	Kitt Peak	Spacewatch	MAR	910 m	MPC · JPL
631924	2007 VX_{339}	—	November 13, 2007	Kitt Peak	Spacewatch	·	910 m	MPC · JPL
631925	2007 VN_{340}	—	November 3, 2007	Mount Lemmon	Mount Lemmon Survey	·	3.0 km	MPC · JPL
631926	2007 VW_{340}	—	November 5, 2007	Mount Lemmon	Mount Lemmon Survey	EOS	1.5 km	MPC · JPL
631927	2007 VV_{342}	—	January 1, 2014	Kitt Peak	Spacewatch	·	2.8 km	MPC · JPL
631928	2007 VX_{342}	—	November 11, 2007	Mount Lemmon	Mount Lemmon Survey	·	2.6 km	MPC · JPL
631929	2007 VC_{343}	—	August 2, 2011	Haleakala	Pan-STARRS 1	·	2.3 km	MPC · JPL
631930	2007 VD_{343}	—	January 2, 2009	Kitt Peak	Spacewatch	·	2.4 km	MPC · JPL
631931	2007 VH_{343}	—	October 22, 2012	Kitt Peak	Spacewatch	·	1.9 km	MPC · JPL
631932	2007 VR_{343}	—	October 17, 2012	Mount Lemmon	Mount Lemmon Survey	·	2.8 km	MPC · JPL
631933	2007 VF_{344}	—	November 9, 2007	Kitt Peak	Spacewatch	·	2.6 km	MPC · JPL
631934	2007 VA_{345}	—	January 17, 2015	Haleakala	Pan-STARRS 1	·	2.6 km	MPC · JPL
631935	2007 VF_{348}	—	December 22, 2012	Haleakala	Pan-STARRS 1	·	1.5 km	MPC · JPL
631936	2007 VH_{348}	—	November 3, 2007	Mount Lemmon	Mount Lemmon Survey	·	3.3 km	MPC · JPL
631937	2007 VJ_{348}	—	November 10, 2007	XuYi	PMO NEO Survey Program	LIX	3.2 km	MPC · JPL
631938	2007 VC_{349}	—	February 3, 2009	Mount Lemmon	Mount Lemmon Survey	EOS	1.9 km	MPC · JPL
631939	2007 VF_{349}	—	November 9, 2007	Mount Lemmon	Mount Lemmon Survey	MAR	1.1 km	MPC · JPL
631940	2007 VN_{349}	—	December 11, 2013	Mount Lemmon	Mount Lemmon Survey	EOS	1.9 km	MPC · JPL
631941	2007 VX_{349}	—	February 13, 2015	Mount Lemmon	Mount Lemmon Survey	VER	2.4 km	MPC · JPL
631942	2007 VD_{351}	—	September 22, 2012	Mount Lemmon	Mount Lemmon Survey	·	1.6 km	MPC · JPL
631943	2007 VR_{351}	—	August 13, 2006	Palomar	NEAT	·	2.7 km	MPC · JPL
631944	2007 VS_{352}	—	November 28, 2013	Mount Lemmon	Mount Lemmon Survey	·	2.1 km	MPC · JPL
631945	2007 VV_{352}	—	July 25, 2017	Haleakala	Pan-STARRS 1	·	1.9 km	MPC · JPL
631946	2007 VX_{352}	—	March 4, 2016	Haleakala	Pan-STARRS 1	VER	2.7 km	MPC · JPL
631947	2007 VB_{359}	—	November 1, 2008	Mount Lemmon	Mount Lemmon Survey	·	3.7 km	MPC · JPL
631948	2007 VL_{359}	—	January 22, 2015	Haleakala	Pan-STARRS 1	·	2.1 km	MPC · JPL
631949	2007 VZ_{363}	—	November 9, 2007	Kitt Peak	Spacewatch	·	3.2 km	MPC · JPL
631950	2007 VA_{364}	—	November 5, 2007	Kitt Peak	Spacewatch	·	3.3 km	MPC · JPL
631951	2007 VD_{364}	—	November 3, 2007	Kitt Peak	Spacewatch	·	2.4 km	MPC · JPL
631952	2007 VC_{374}	—	November 7, 2007	Mount Lemmon	Mount Lemmon Survey	EUN	1.2 km	MPC · JPL
631953	2007 VN_{374}	—	November 2, 2007	Mount Lemmon	Mount Lemmon Survey	·	2.9 km	MPC · JPL
631954	2007 VG_{375}	—	November 8, 2007	Mount Lemmon	Mount Lemmon Survey	·	2.9 km	MPC · JPL
631955	2007 VX_{376}	—	November 7, 2007	Mount Lemmon	Mount Lemmon Survey	·	2.1 km	MPC · JPL
631956	2007 VJ_{379}	—	November 13, 2007	Kitt Peak	Spacewatch	KOR	1.3 km	MPC · JPL
631957	2007 VN_{382}	—	November 2, 2007	Kitt Peak	Spacewatch	·	2.4 km	MPC · JPL
631958	2007 WN_{1}	—	November 17, 2007	Saint-Sulpice	B. Christophe	·	2.4 km	MPC · JPL
631959	2007 WH_{3}	—	August 28, 1995	Kitt Peak	Spacewatch	·	3.1 km	MPC · JPL
631960	2007 WD_{10}	—	November 17, 2007	Mount Lemmon	Mount Lemmon Survey	·	1.0 km	MPC · JPL
631961	2007 WN_{10}	—	October 9, 2007	Kitt Peak	Spacewatch	·	2.6 km	MPC · JPL
631962	2007 WV_{13}	—	November 4, 2007	Mount Lemmon	Mount Lemmon Survey	·	3.0 km	MPC · JPL
631963	2007 WS_{17}	—	December 17, 2003	Kitt Peak	Spacewatch	MAR	1.2 km	MPC · JPL
631964	2007 WE_{18}	—	November 18, 2007	Mount Lemmon	Mount Lemmon Survey	·	2.4 km	MPC · JPL
631965	2007 WE_{28}	—	November 18, 2007	Mount Lemmon	Mount Lemmon Survey	·	2.9 km	MPC · JPL
631966	2007 WM_{29}	—	November 2, 2007	Kitt Peak	Spacewatch	·	2.7 km	MPC · JPL
631967	2007 WN_{29}	—	November 19, 2007	Kitt Peak	Spacewatch	·	2.4 km	MPC · JPL
631968	2007 WQ_{29}	—	November 19, 2007	Kitt Peak	Spacewatch	·	3.0 km	MPC · JPL
631969	2007 WG_{30}	—	November 2, 2007	Kitt Peak	Spacewatch	·	490 m	MPC · JPL
631970	2007 WT_{32}	—	November 19, 2007	Mount Lemmon	Mount Lemmon Survey	·	2.8 km	MPC · JPL
631971	2007 WT_{37}	—	November 8, 2007	Kitt Peak	Spacewatch	·	2.6 km	MPC · JPL
631972	2007 WZ_{44}	—	November 20, 2007	Mount Lemmon	Mount Lemmon Survey	·	2.2 km	MPC · JPL
631973	2007 WH_{45}	—	August 29, 2006	Catalina	CSS	·	3.3 km	MPC · JPL
631974	2007 WX_{47}	—	November 20, 2007	Mount Lemmon	Mount Lemmon Survey	·	2.3 km	MPC · JPL
631975	2007 WC_{48}	—	October 21, 2007	Mount Lemmon	Mount Lemmon Survey	·	2.3 km	MPC · JPL
631976	2007 WP_{50}	—	November 11, 2001	Apache Point	SDSS Collaboration	·	2.9 km	MPC · JPL
631977	2007 WX_{53}	—	October 23, 2003	Kitt Peak	Spacewatch	·	1.1 km	MPC · JPL
631978	2007 WK_{57}	—	October 20, 2007	Mount Lemmon	Mount Lemmon Survey	·	1.2 km	MPC · JPL
631979	2007 WH_{61}	—	March 11, 2005	Mount Lemmon	Mount Lemmon Survey	·	1.1 km	MPC · JPL
631980	2007 WJ_{64}	—	October 12, 2007	Mount Lemmon	Mount Lemmon Survey	·	2.6 km	MPC · JPL
631981	2007 WS_{65}	—	August 25, 2012	Kitt Peak	Spacewatch	·	2.5 km	MPC · JPL
631982	2007 WX_{65}	—	October 21, 2012	Haleakala	Pan-STARRS 1	·	1.7 km	MPC · JPL
631983	2007 WH_{66}	—	October 18, 2012	Haleakala	Pan-STARRS 1	·	2.4 km	MPC · JPL
631984	2007 WX_{66}	—	November 4, 2007	Kitt Peak	Spacewatch	·	1.0 km	MPC · JPL
631985	2007 WK_{68}	—	November 18, 2007	Mount Lemmon	Mount Lemmon Survey	·	2.7 km	MPC · JPL
631986	2007 WJ_{69}	—	October 16, 2012	Mount Lemmon	Mount Lemmon Survey	EOS	1.5 km	MPC · JPL
631987	2007 WM_{69}	—	March 24, 2015	Haleakala	Pan-STARRS 1	·	1.7 km	MPC · JPL
631988	2007 WG_{70}	—	November 19, 2007	Kitt Peak	Spacewatch	·	1.6 km	MPC · JPL
631989	2007 WV_{70}	—	July 28, 2011	Haleakala	Pan-STARRS 1	·	2.7 km	MPC · JPL
631990	2007 WX_{70}	—	February 22, 2009	Kitt Peak	Spacewatch	·	940 m	MPC · JPL
631991	2007 WX_{71}	—	November 19, 2007	Kitt Peak	Spacewatch	·	2.4 km	MPC · JPL
631992	2007 WK_{72}	—	November 18, 2007	Mount Lemmon	Mount Lemmon Survey	·	2.7 km	MPC · JPL
631993	2007 WQ_{75}	—	November 20, 2007	Mount Lemmon	Mount Lemmon Survey	VER	2.1 km	MPC · JPL
631994	2007 XJ_{5}	—	December 4, 2007	Kitt Peak	Spacewatch	MAR	780 m	MPC · JPL
631995	2007 XB_{13}	—	November 1, 2007	Kitt Peak	Spacewatch	VER	2.9 km	MPC · JPL
631996	2007 XY_{23}	—	December 3, 2007	Kitt Peak	Spacewatch	·	3.6 km	MPC · JPL
631997	2007 XK_{27}	—	December 14, 2007	Kitt Peak	Spacewatch	·	2.9 km	MPC · JPL
631998	2007 XA_{32}	—	December 15, 2007	Mount Lemmon	Mount Lemmon Survey	·	1.1 km	MPC · JPL
631999	2007 XJ_{37}	—	December 13, 2007	Socorro	LINEAR	HNS	1.5 km	MPC · JPL
632000	2007 XL_{38}	—	December 13, 2007	Socorro	LINEAR	·	2.8 km	MPC · JPL

back to top

== Meaning of names ==
As minor planet discoveries are confirmed, they are given a permanent number by the IAU's Minor Planet Center (MPC), and the discoverers can then submit names for them, following the IAU's naming conventions. The list below concerns those minor planets in the specified number-range that have received names, and explains the meanings of those names.

Official naming citations of newly named small Solar System bodies are approved and published in a bulletin by IAU's Working Group for Small Bodies Nomenclature (WGSBN). Before May 2021, citations were published in MPC's Minor Planet Circulars for many decades. Recent citations can also be found on the JPL Small-Body Database (SBDB). Until his death in 2016, German astronomer Lutz D. Schmadel compiled these citations into the Dictionary of Minor Planet Names (DMP) and regularly updated the collection.

Based on Paul Herget's The Names of the Minor Planets, Schmadel also researched the unclear origin of numerous asteroids, most of which had been named prior to World War II. This article incorporates text from this source, which is in the public domain: SBDB New namings may only be added to this list below after official publication as the preannouncement of names is condemned. The WGSBN publishes a comprehensive guideline for the naming rules of non-cometary small Solar System bodies.

Named minor planet	Provisional	This minor planet was named for...	Ref · Catalog
631202 Aquarellia	2006 WW_{83}	Michel Deconinck, Belgian astronomy enthusiast known as Aquarellia, his artist name.	IAU · 631202
631626 Benedektibor	2007 RP_{329}	Tibor Benedek, Hungarian Olympic, European and World champion water polo player.	IAU · 631626
