= 2019–20 LEN Euro Cup =

2019−20 LEN Euro Cup
- League: LEN Euro Cup
- Sport: Water Polo
- Duration: 13 September 2019 – 9 May 2020
- Games: 50
- Teams: 20 (from 12 countries)

Euro Cup seasons
- ← 2018–19 2020−21 →

The 2019–20 LEN Euro Cup was the 28th edition of the second-tier European tournament for water polo clubs. It ran from 13 September 2019 to 9 May 2020.

== Overview ==
=== Calendar ===
The calendar of the competition was announced on 3 August 2019.

Phase	Round	First leg	Second leg
Qualifying phase	Qualification round I	13–15 September 2019	
Qualifying phase	Qualification round II	27–29 September 2019	
Knockout stage	Quarterfinals	30 October 2019	9 November 2019
Knockout stage	Semifinals	22 February 2020	4 March 2020
Knockout stage	Final	22 April 2020	9 May 2020

=== Participating teams ===
16 teams participated at the QR1 with half of them advancing to QR2. The four teams eliminated from the Champions League QR3 joined the qualified teams in the Quarterfinals.

Qualification round I
(Belgium) AZSC Antwerp	(Spain) CN Mataró	(Hungary) Egri VK	(Malta) Valletta WPC
(Croatia) VK Mornar	(Spain) CE Mediterrani	(Hungary) MVLC Miskolc	(Russia) Shturm 2002
(Croatia) VK Solaris	(France) Montpellier	(Italy) CC Ortigia	(Serbia) VK Radnički Kragujevac
(Cyprus) APOEL Nicosia	(France) CN Noisy-le-Sec	(Italy) CN Posillipo	(Serbia) VK Partizan
Quarter Finals
(Italy) AN Brescia (CL Q3)	(Greece) NC Vouliagmeni (CL Q3)	(Romania) CSM Oradea (CL Q3)	(France) Team Strasbourg (CL Q3)

== Qualifying phase ==
=== Qualification round I ===
==== Pools composition ====
The draw was held on 4 August 2019. The cities selected to host the groups were Eger (Hungary), Split (Croatia), Syracuse (Italy) and Valletta (Malta).

Group A	Group B	Group C	Group D
(Belgium) AZSC Antwerp	(Hungary) Egri VK (H)	(France) CN Noisy-le-Sec	(Cyprus) APOEL Nicosia
(Spain) CE Mediterrani	(Russia) Shturm 2002	(Italy) CN Posillipo	(Italy) CC Ortigia (H)
(Spain) CN Mataró	(Serbia) VK Radnički Kragujevac	(Hungary) MVLC Miskolc	(France) Montpellier
(Croatia) VK Mornar (H)	(Croatia) VK Solaris	(Malta) Valletta WPC (H)	(Serbia) VK Partizan

==== Group A ====
Team	Pts	Pld	W	D	L	GF	GA	GD	Qualification
(Spain) CE Mediterrani	9	3	3	0	0	40	21	+19	QR2
(Spain) CN Mataró	6	3	2	0	1	39	23	+16	QR2
(Croatia) VK Mornar	3	3	1	0	2	29	24	+5	
(Belgium) AZSC Antwerp	0	3	0	0	0	20	60	-40	

13 Sep 2019; 19:00	Report	AZSC Antwerp (Belgium)	6–19	(Spain) CE Mediterrani	Bazeni Poljud (Split); Referees: Vogel (HUN), Stavridis (GRE)
13 Sep 2019; 19:00	Report	Score by quarters: 2–5, 0–3, 3–7, 1–4			Bazeni Poljud (Split); Referees: Vogel (HUN), Stavridis (GRE)
13 Sep 2019; 19:00	Report	2: Bus, Poelmans, Opacak	Goals	4: Vujović; 3: Gorria Puga, Stevenson	Bazeni Poljud (Split); Referees: Vogel (HUN), Stavridis (GRE)

13 Sep 2019; 20:30	Report	VK Mornar (Croatia)	5–7	(Spain) CN Mataró	Bazeni Poljud (Split); Referees: Rovida (ITA), Margeta (SLO)
13 Sep 2019; 20:30	Report	Score by quarters: 1–2, 2–0, 1–3, 1–2			Bazeni Poljud (Split); Referees: Rovida (ITA), Margeta (SLO)
13 Sep 2019; 20:30	Report	2: Ban; 1: D. Akrap, Buzdovačić, Jerković	Goals	3: de Freitas; 2: Bertran	Bazeni Poljud (Split); Referees: Rovida (ITA), Margeta (SLO)

14 Sep 2019; 18:30	Report	CE Mediterrani (Spain)	11–9	(Spain) CN Mataró	Bazeni Poljud (Split); Referees: Margeta (SLO), Vogel (HUN)
14 Sep 2019; 18:30	Report	Score by quarters: 3–2, 4–0, 2–3, 2–4			Bazeni Poljud (Split); Referees: Margeta (SLO), Vogel (HUN)
14 Sep 2019; 18:30	Report	4: Minguell; 2: Gorria Puga, Stevenson	Goals	3: Veich; 2: Codina	Bazeni Poljud (Split); Referees: Margeta (SLO), Vogel (HUN)

14 Sep 2019; 20:00	Report	VK Mornar (Croatia)	18–7	(Belgium) AZSC Antwerp	Bazeni Poljud (Split); Referees: Stavridis (GRE), Rovida (ITA)
14 Sep 2019; 20:00	Report	Score by quarters: 4–0, 5–1, 6–5, 3–1			Bazeni Poljud (Split); Referees: Stavridis (GRE), Rovida (ITA)
14 Sep 2019; 20:00	Report	3: Kreković, Ćalić; 2: Solje, D. Akrap, Rako, Bušelić	Goals	3: Opacak; 2: Van Hoey	Bazeni Poljud (Split); Referees: Stavridis (GRE), Rovida (ITA)

15 Sep 2019; 10:30	Report	CN Mataró (Spain)	23–7	(Belgium) AZSC Antwerp	Bazeni Poljud (Split); Referees: Vogel (HUN), Rovida (ITA)
15 Sep 2019; 10:30	Report	Score by quarters: 7–2, 7–2, 4–1, 5–2			Bazeni Poljud (Split); Referees: Vogel (HUN), Rovida (ITA)
15 Sep 2019; 10:30	Report	6: de Freitas; 4: Bertran, Codina	Goals	2: Van Hoey, Poelmans, Opacak; 1: Maksymiuk	Bazeni Poljud (Split); Referees: Vogel (HUN), Rovida (ITA)

15 Sep 2019; 12:00	Report	VK Mornar (Croatia)	6–10	(Spain) CE Mediterrani	Bazeni Poljud (Split); Referees: Stavridis (GRE), Margeta (SLO)
15 Sep 2019; 12:00	Report	Score by quarters: 1–4, 1–3, 1–1, 3–2			Bazeni Poljud (Split); Referees: Stavridis (GRE), Margeta (SLO)
15 Sep 2019; 12:00	Report	2: Krolo; 1: R. Akrap, Ćalić, D. Akrap, Jerković	Goals	3: Urzáinqui; 2: Gorria Puga, Roca Barceló	Bazeni Poljud (Split); Referees: Stavridis (GRE), Margeta (SLO)

==== Group B ====
Team	Pts	Pld	W	D	L	GF	GA	GD	Qualification
(Hungary) Egri VK	9	3	3	0	0	44	19	+25	QR2
(Croatia) VK Solaris	6	3	2	0	1	32	30	+2	QR2
(Serbia) VK Radnički Kragujevac	3	3	1	0	2	23	27	-4	
(Russia) Shturm 2002	0	3	0	0	3	22	45	-23	

13 Sep 2019; 18:30	Report	Egri VK (Hungary)	14–6	(Croatia) VK Solaris	Bitskey Aladár Uszoda (Eger); Referees: Dervieux (FRA), Castagnola (ITA)
13 Sep 2019; 18:30	Report	Score by quarters: 1–1, 5–1, 4–1, 4–3			Bitskey Aladár Uszoda (Eger); Referees: Dervieux (FRA), Castagnola (ITA)
13 Sep 2019; 18:30	Report	4: Gyárfás; 3: Rašović, Hosnyánszky	Goals	2: Strkalj, Bulat; 1: Herceg, Kovačić	Bitskey Aladár Uszoda (Eger); Referees: Dervieux (FRA), Castagnola (ITA)

13 Sep 2019; 20:15	Report	VK Radnički Kragujevac (Serbia)	9–7	(Russia) Shturm 2002	Bitskey Aladár Uszoda (Eger); Referees: Koryzna (POL), Teixido (ESP)
13 Sep 2019; 20:15	Report	Score by quarters: 4–1, 2–4, 2–1, 1–1			Bitskey Aladár Uszoda (Eger); Referees: Koryzna (POL), Teixido (ESP)
13 Sep 2019; 20:15	Report	2: Janković, Toholj, Dino; 1: Branković, Frolov, Lobov	Goals	2: Kovalenko, Rulhov; 1: Kuzmenkov, Pronin, Fedotov	Bitskey Aladár Uszoda (Eger); Referees: Koryzna (POL), Teixido (ESP)

14 Sep 2019; 18:30	Report	Egri VK (Hungary)	19–7	(Russia) Shturm 2002	Bitskey Aladár Uszoda (Eger); Referees: Teixido (ESP), Castagnola (ITA)
14 Sep 2019; 18:30	Report	Score by quarters: 6–0, 5–3, 3–1, 5–3			Bitskey Aladár Uszoda (Eger); Referees: Teixido (ESP), Castagnola (ITA)
14 Sep 2019; 18:30	Report	4: Rašović, Hosnyánszky; 3: Murišić, Vlachopoulos	Goals	2: Mano, Maksim; 1: Bukov, Pronin, Fedotov	Bitskey Aladár Uszoda (Eger); Referees: Teixido (ESP), Castagnola (ITA)

14 Sep 2019; 20:15	Report	VK Solaris (Croatia)	9–8	(Serbia) VK Radnički Kragujevac	Bitskey Aladár Uszoda (Eger); Referees: Dervieux (FRA), Koryzna (POL)
14 Sep 2019; 20:15	Report	Score by quarters: 2–2, 2–2, 3–2, 2–2			Bitskey Aladár Uszoda (Eger); Referees: Dervieux (FRA), Koryzna (POL)
14 Sep 2019; 20:15	Report	3: Herceg, Vlahović; 1: Mudražija, Koprčina, Kovačić	Goals	2: Frolov, Lukić; 1: Branković, Toholj, Lobov, Dino	Bitskey Aladár Uszoda (Eger); Referees: Dervieux (FRA), Koryzna (POL)

15 Sep 2019; 09:45	Report	Shturm 2002 (Russia)	8–17	(Croatia) VK Solaris	Bitskey Aladár Uszoda (Eger); Referees: Teixido (ESP), Dervieux (FRA)
15 Sep 2019; 09:45	Report	Score by quarters: 2–5, 2–5, 1–3, 3–4			Bitskey Aladár Uszoda (Eger); Referees: Teixido (ESP), Dervieux (FRA)
15 Sep 2019; 09:45	Report	3: Emelianov; 2: Fedotov	Goals	4: Strkalj; 3: Sabioni	Bitskey Aladár Uszoda (Eger); Referees: Teixido (ESP), Dervieux (FRA)

15 Sep 2019; 11:30	Report	Egri VK (Hungary)	11–6	(Serbia) VK Radnički Kragujevac	Bitskey Aladár Uszoda (Eger); Referees: Castagnola (ITA), Koryzna (POL)
15 Sep 2019; 11:30	Report	Score by quarters: 1–0, 1–1, 4–2, 5–3			Bitskey Aladár Uszoda (Eger); Referees: Castagnola (ITA), Koryzna (POL)
15 Sep 2019; 11:30	Report	3: Rašović; 2: Gyárfás, Vlachopoulos	Goals	2: Janković, Frolov, Dino	Bitskey Aladár Uszoda (Eger); Referees: Castagnola (ITA), Koryzna (POL)

==== Group C ====
Team	Pts	Pld	W	D	L	GF	GA	GD	Qualification
(Hungary) MVLC Miskolc	9	3	3	0	0	47	27	+20	QR2
(France) CN Noisy-le-Sec	6	3	2	0	1	39	32	+7	QR2
(Italy) CN Posillipo	3	3	1	0	2	28	36	-8	
(Malta) Valletta WPC	0	3	0	0	3	27	46	-19	

13 Sep 2019; 18:00	Report	CN Noisy-le-Sec (France)	10–15	(Hungary) MVLC Miskolc	National Swimming Pool (Valletta); Referees: Boudramis (GRE), Tiozzo (CRO)
13 Sep 2019; 18:00	Report	Score by quarters: 2–1, 3–5, 2–4, 3–5			National Swimming Pool (Valletta); Referees: Boudramis (GRE), Tiozzo (CRO)
13 Sep 2019; 18:00	Report	3: Petković; 2: Marzouki, Pešterić	Goals	4: Nagy; 3: Miličić	National Swimming Pool (Valletta); Referees: Boudramis (GRE), Tiozzo (CRO)

13 Sep 2019; 19:15	Report	Valletta WPC (Malta)	8–13	(Italy) CN Posillipo	National Swimming Pool (Valletta); Referees: Santos (POR), Jimenez (ESP)
13 Sep 2019; 19:15	Report	Score by quarters: 2–3, 1–3, 2–3, 3–4			National Swimming Pool (Valletta); Referees: Santos (POR), Jimenez (ESP)
13 Sep 2019; 19:15	Report	3: Gabarretta, J. Camileri; 1: N. Zammit, Muscat	Goals	2: M. Di Martire, Mattiello, Parrella; G. Di Martire, Ricci	National Swimming Pool (Valletta); Referees: Santos (POR), Jimenez (ESP)

14 Sep 2019; 17:00	Report	MVLC Miskolc (Hungary)	15–8	(Italy) CN Posillipo	National Swimming Pool (Valletta); Referees: Jimenez (ESP), Boudramis (GRE)
14 Sep 2019; 17:00	Report	Score by quarters: 3–1, 4–4, 6–3, 2–0			National Swimming Pool (Valletta); Referees: Jimenez (ESP), Boudramis (GRE)
14 Sep 2019; 17:00	Report	4: Nagy; 2: Kriještorac, Vadovics, Bedő, Stojanović	Goals	3: M. Di Martire; 2: Marziali, G. Di Martire	National Swimming Pool (Valletta); Referees: Jimenez (ESP), Boudramis (GRE)

14 Sep 2019; 18:15	Report	CN Noisy-le-Sec (France)	16–10	(Malta) Valletta WPC	National Swimming Pool (Valletta); Referees: Tiozzo (CRO), Santos (POR)
14 Sep 2019; 18:15	Report	Score by quarters: 1–1, 5–2, 5–3, 5–4			National Swimming Pool (Valletta); Referees: Tiozzo (CRO), Santos (POR)
14 Sep 2019; 18:15	Report	6: Petković; 3: Marzouki	Goals	3: J. Camileri; 1: D. Zammit	National Swimming Pool (Valletta); Referees: Tiozzo (CRO), Santos (POR)

15 Sep 2019; 09:00	Report	CN Posillipo (Italy)	7–13	(France) CN Noisy-le-Sec	National Swimming Pool (Valletta); Referees: Santos (POR), Tiozzo (CRO)
15 Sep 2019; 09:00	Report	Score by quarters: 2–3, 3–3, 1–3, 1–4			National Swimming Pool (Valletta); Referees: Santos (POR), Tiozzo (CRO)
15 Sep 2019; 09:00	Report	3: G. Di Martire; 2: M. Di Martire	Goals	3: Pliskevich, Marzouki; 2: Petković	National Swimming Pool (Valletta); Referees: Santos (POR), Tiozzo (CRO)

15 Sep 2019; 10:15	Report	Valletta WPC (Malta)	9–17	(Hungary) MVLC Miskolc	National Swimming Pool (Valletta); Referees: Boudramis (GRE), Jimenez (ESP)
15 Sep 2019; 10:15	Report	Score by quarters: 4–2, 2–6, 2–5, 1–4			National Swimming Pool (Valletta); Referees: Boudramis (GRE), Jimenez (ESP)
15 Sep 2019; 10:15	Report	3: J. Camileri; 2: D. Zammit	Goals	3: Baničević, Vadovics, Mišić, Stojanović; 2: Lőrincz	National Swimming Pool (Valletta); Referees: Boudramis (GRE), Jimenez (ESP)

==== Group D ====
Team	Pts	Pld	W	D	L	GF	GA	GD	Qualification
(France) Montpellier	9	3	3	0	0	41	26	+15	QR2
(Italy) CC Ortigia	6	3	2	0	1	45	21	+24	QR2
(Serbia) VK Partizan	3	3	1	0	2	49	35	+14	
(Cyprus) APOEL Nicosia	0	3	0	0	3	20	73	-53	

13 Sep 2019; 18:00	Report	VK Partizan (Serbia)	30–9	(Cyprus) APOEL Nicosia	Piscina Paolo Caldarella (Syracuse); Referees: Peris (CRO), Naumov (RUS)
13 Sep 2019; 18:00	Report	Score by quarters: 7–2, 6–3, 8–3, 9–1			Piscina Paolo Caldarella (Syracuse); Referees: Peris (CRO), Naumov (RUS)
13 Sep 2019; 18:00	Report	5: Radulović, Mitrović, Smiljević; 4: Barać	Goals	6: Chatzitheodoru; 2: Prodromou	Piscina Paolo Caldarella (Syracuse); Referees: Peris (CRO), Naumov (RUS)

13 Sep 2019; 19:30	Report	Montpellier (France)	9–8	(Italy) CC Ortigia	Piscina Paolo Caldarella (Syracuse); Referees: Kun (HUN), Zwart (NED)
13 Sep 2019; 19:30	Report	Score by quarters: 2–0, 1–2, 3–3, 3–3			Piscina Paolo Caldarella (Syracuse); Referees: Kun (HUN), Zwart (NED)
13 Sep 2019; 19:30	Report	3: Ivanković; 2: Kalinić	Goals	2: Giacoppo, Gallo, Vidović; 1: Cassia, Rossi	Piscina Paolo Caldarella (Syracuse); Referees: Kun (HUN), Zwart (NED)

14 Sep 2019; 18:00	Report	APOEL Nicosia (Cyprus)	8–18	(France) Montpellier	Piscina Paolo Caldarella (Syracuse); Referees: Zwart (NED), Peris (CRO)
14 Sep 2019; 18:00	Report	Score by quarters: 0–4, 2–3, 3–6, 3–5			Piscina Paolo Caldarella (Syracuse); Referees: Zwart (NED), Peris (CRO)
14 Sep 2019; 18:00	Report	3: Nicolau; 2: Chatzitheodoru, Prodromou	Goals	3: Piot, Mustur; 2: Vilcot, Delaš, Kalinić, I. Živković	Piscina Paolo Caldarella (Syracuse); Referees: Zwart (NED), Peris (CRO)

14 Sep 2019; 19:30	Report	CC Ortigia (Italy)	12–9	(Serbia) VK Partizan	Piscina Paolo Caldarella (Syracuse); Referees: Kun (HUN), Naumov (RUS)
14 Sep 2019; 19:30	Report	Score by quarters: 3–1, 4–2, 1–3, 4–3			Piscina Paolo Caldarella (Syracuse); Referees: Kun (HUN), Naumov (RUS)
14 Sep 2019; 19:30	Report	4: Gallo; 3: Vidović	Goals	3: Radanović, Smiljević; 2: Vicković	Piscina Paolo Caldarella (Syracuse); Referees: Kun (HUN), Naumov (RUS)

15 Sep 2019; 10:30	Report	Montpellier (France)	14–10	(Serbia) VK Partizan	Piscina Paolo Caldarella (Syracuse); Referees: Kun (HUN), Peris (CRO)
15 Sep 2019; 10:30	Report	Score by quarters: 3–2, 4–4, 5–4, 2–0			Piscina Paolo Caldarella (Syracuse); Referees: Kun (HUN), Peris (CRO)
15 Sep 2019; 10:30	Report	4: Ivanković; 3: Kalinić	Goals	4: Barac; 2: Vicković, Smiljević	Piscina Paolo Caldarella (Syracuse); Referees: Kun (HUN), Peris (CRO)

15 Sep 2019; 12:00	Report	CC Ortigia (Italy)	25–3	(Cyprus) APOEL Nicosia	Piscina Paolo Caldarella (Syracuse); Referees: Naumov (RUS), Zwart (NED)
15 Sep 2019; 12:00	Report	Score by quarters: 6–1, 8–1, 5–0, 6–1			Piscina Paolo Caldarella (Syracuse); Referees: Naumov (RUS), Zwart (NED)
15 Sep 2019; 12:00	Report	3: Cassia, Di Luciano, Giacoppo, Gallo, Condemi	Goals	1: Chatzitheodoru, Nikolau, Prodromou	Piscina Paolo Caldarella (Syracuse); Referees: Naumov (RUS), Zwart (NED)

=== Qualification round II ===
==== Pools composition ====
The draw for this stage of the competition was held at LEN headquarters in Nyon (Switzerland) on 17 September 2019. The hosts of the two groups were Mataró (Spain) and Šibenik (Croatia).

Group E	Group F
(Italy) CC Ortigia	(Spain) CN Mataró (H)
(Spain) CE Mediterrani	(France) CN Noisy-le-Sec
(Hungary) MVLC Miskolc	(Hungary) Egri VK
(Croatia) VK Solaris (H)	(France) Montpellier

==== Group E ====
Team	Pts	Pld	W	D	L	GF	GA	GD	Qualification
(Hungary) MVLC Miskolc	9	3	3	0	0	38	28	+10	Quarterfinals
(Italy) CC Ortigia	6	3	2	0	1	35	29	+6	Quarterfinals
(Spain) CE Mediterrani	1	3	0	1	2	27	35	-8	
(Croatia) VK Solaris	1	3	0	1	2	23	31	-8	

27 Sep 2019; 18:45	Report	VK Solaris (Croatia)	10–12	(Italy) CC Ortigia	Bazeni Crnica (Šibenik); Referees: Schwartz (ISR), Shopp (GER)
27 Sep 2019; 18:45	Report	Score by quarters: 2–3, 3–2, 1–4, 4–3			Bazeni Crnica (Šibenik); Referees: Schwartz (ISR), Shopp (GER)
27 Sep 2019; 18:45	Report	3: Herceg, Vlahović; 2: Koprčina	Goals	5: Gallo; 3: Rossi	Bazeni Crnica (Šibenik); Referees: Schwartz (ISR), Shopp (GER)

27 Sep 2019; 20:30	Report	CE Mediterrani (Spain)	12–15	(Hungary) MVLC Miskolc	Bazeni Crnica (Šibenik); Referees: Birakis (GRE), de Jong (NED)
27 Sep 2019; 20:30	Report	Score by quarters: 6–4, 3–2, 1–3, 2–6			Bazeni Crnica (Šibenik); Referees: Birakis (GRE), de Jong (NED)
27 Sep 2019; 20:30	Report	3: Minguell, Roca; 2: Galeev, Stevenson	Goals	7: Manzi; 2: Nagy, Lőrincz, Stojanović	Bazeni Crnica (Šibenik); Referees: Birakis (GRE), de Jong (NED)

28 Sep 2019; 18:45	Report	VK Solaris (Croatia)	5–11	(Hungary) MVLC Miskolc	Bazeni Crnica (Šibenik); Referees: de Jong (NED), Birakis (GRE)
28 Sep 2019; 18:45	Report	Score by quarters: 0–3, 1–4, 3–3, 1–1			Bazeni Crnica (Šibenik); Referees: de Jong (NED), Birakis (GRE)
28 Sep 2019; 18:45	Report	1: Erak, Štrkalj, Herceg, Vlahović, Sabioni	Goals	4: Mišić; 3: Stojanović	Bazeni Crnica (Šibenik); Referees: de Jong (NED), Birakis (GRE)

28 Sep 2019; 20:30	Report	CC Ortigia (Italy)	12–7	(Spain) CE Mediterrani	Bazeni Crnica (Šibenik); Referees: Shopp (GER), Schwartz (ISR)
28 Sep 2019; 20:30	Report	Score by quarters: 4–0, 3–2, 4–1, 1–4			Bazeni Crnica (Šibenik); Referees: Shopp (GER), Schwartz (ISR)
28 Sep 2019; 20:30	Report	6: Giacoppo; 2: Di Luciano, Napolitano	Goals	3: Frigola, Pérez; 1: Gorria	Bazeni Crnica (Šibenik); Referees: Shopp (GER), Schwartz (ISR)

29 Sep 2019; 09:45	Report	MVLC Miskolc (Hungary)	12–11	(Italy) CC Ortigia	Bazeni Crnica (Šibenik); Referees: Schwartz (ISR), Shopp (GER)
29 Sep 2019; 09:45	Report	Score by quarters: 2–4, 4–2, 3–4, 3–1			Bazeni Crnica (Šibenik); Referees: Schwartz (ISR), Shopp (GER)
29 Sep 2019; 09:45	Report	4: Nagy; 2: Vadovics, Lőrincz, Mišić	Goals	3: Napolitano; 2: Giacoppo, Vidović	Bazeni Crnica (Šibenik); Referees: Schwartz (ISR), Shopp (GER)

29 Sep 2019; 11:30	Report	VK Solaris (Croatia)	8–8	(Spain) CE Mediterrani	Bazeni Crnica (Šibenik); Referees: Birakis (GRE), de Jong (NED)
29 Sep 2019; 11:30	Report	Score by quarters: 1–2, 2–3, 4–3, 1–0			Bazeni Crnica (Šibenik); Referees: Birakis (GRE), de Jong (NED)
29 Sep 2019; 11:30	Report	3: Koprčina; 2: Vlahović	Goals	4: Minguell; 1: Gorria, Vujović, García U., Stevenson	Bazeni Crnica (Šibenik); Referees: Birakis (GRE), de Jong (NED)

==== Group F ====
Team	Pts	Pld	W	D	L	GF	GA	GD	Qualification
(Hungary) Egri VK	9	3	3	0	0	41	20	+21	Quarterfinals
(Spain) CN Mataró	6	3	2	0	1	26	27	-1	Quarterfinals
(France) Montpellier	3	3	1	0	2	23	32	-9	
(France) CN Noisy-le-Sec	0	3	0	0	3	25	36	-11	

27 Sep 2019; 16:00	Report	Egri VK (Hungary)	14–7	(France) CN Noisy-le-Sec	Piscina Joan Serra (Mataró); Referees: Petronilli (ITA), Milović (SRB)
27 Sep 2019; 16:00	Report	Score by quarters: 3–2, 3–3, 5–2, 3–0			Piscina Joan Serra (Mataró); Referees: Petronilli (ITA), Milović (SRB)
27 Sep 2019; 16:00	Report	4: Rašović, Hosnyánszky; 2: Baksa, Murisić	Goals	3: Pešterić; 2: Peisson	Piscina Joan Serra (Mataró); Referees: Petronilli (ITA), Milović (SRB)

27 Sep 2019; 17:30	Report	CN Mataró (Spain)	8–6	(France) Montpellier	Piscina Joan Serra (Mataró); Referees: Štampalija (CRO), Türkkan (TUR)
27 Sep 2019; 17:30	Report	Score by quarters: 1–1, 1–1, 1–2, 5–2			Piscina Joan Serra (Mataró); Referees: Štampalija (CRO), Türkkan (TUR)
27 Sep 2019; 17:30	Report	3: Yañez; 2: Bertran, Codina	Goals	3: Mustur; 1: Ivanković, Kalinić, Živković	Piscina Joan Serra (Mataró); Referees: Štampalija (CRO), Türkkan (TUR)

28 Sep 2019; 16:00	Report	Montpellier (France)	5–16	(Hungary) Egri VK	Piscina Joan Serra (Mataró); Referees: Türkkan (TUR), Petronilli (ITA)
28 Sep 2019; 16:00	Report	Score by quarters: 2–5, 1–4, 2–3, 0–4			Piscina Joan Serra (Mataró); Referees: Türkkan (TUR), Petronilli (ITA)
28 Sep 2019; 16:00	Report	2: Ivanković, Živković; 1: Mustur	Goals	3: Hosnyánszky, Vlachopoulos, Magyar; 2: Baksa	Piscina Joan Serra (Mataró); Referees: Türkkan (TUR), Petronilli (ITA)

28 Sep 2019; 17:30	Report	CN Mataró (Spain)	10–9	(France) CN Noisy-le-Sec	Piscina Joan Serra (Mataró); Referees: Štampalija (CRO), Milović (SRB)
28 Sep 2019; 17:30	Report	Score by quarters: 2–3, 4–2, 3–2, 1–2			Piscina Joan Serra (Mataró); Referees: Štampalija (CRO), Milović (SRB)
28 Sep 2019; 17:30	Report	4: Minguez; 2: Bertran	Goals	2: Petković, Marzouki, Pešterić; 1: Pliskevich, Kolarik, Peisson	Piscina Joan Serra (Mataró); Referees: Štampalija (CRO), Milović (SRB)

29 Sep 2019; 11:00	Report	CN Noisy-le-Sec (France)	9–12	(France) Montpellier	Piscina Joan Serra (Mataró); Referees: Štampalija (CRO), Petronilli (ITA)
29 Sep 2019; 11:00	Report	Score by quarters: 3–3, 1–3, 4–1, 1–5			Piscina Joan Serra (Mataró); Referees: Štampalija (CRO), Petronilli (ITA)
29 Sep 2019; 11:00	Report	2: Kolarik, Petković, Marzouki; 1: Pliskevich, Sterling, Peisson	Goals	4: Živković; 2: Ivanković, Kalinić	Piscina Joan Serra (Mataró); Referees: Štampalija (CRO), Petronilli (ITA)

29 Sep 2019; 12:30	Report	CN Mataró (Spain)	8–12	(Hungary) Egri VK	Piscina Joan Serra (Mataró); Referees: Türkkan (TUR), Milović (SRB)
29 Sep 2019; 12:30	Report	Score by quarters: 2–2, 0–3, 4–3, 2–4			Piscina Joan Serra (Mataró); Referees: Türkkan (TUR), Milović (SRB)
29 Sep 2019; 12:30	Report	2: Fernández, Yañez; 1: Cobalan, Bertran, Barbena, de Freitas	Goals	3: Vlachopoulos; 2: Baksa, Murisić, Magyar	Piscina Joan Serra (Mataró); Referees: Türkkan (TUR), Milović (SRB)

== Knockout stage ==
=== Quarterfinals ===
The draw was held in Nyon (Switzerland), at LEN offices, on 1 October 2019.

Team 1	Agg.	Team 2	1st leg	2nd leg
AN Brescia (Italy)	28–20	(Hungary) MVLC Miskolc	17–10	11–10
CSM Oradea (Romania)	20–19	(Spain) CN Mataró	12–9	8–10
CC Ortigia (Italy)	16–15	(Greece) NC Vouliagmeni	9–9	7–6
Egri VK (Hungary)	22–21 (p)	(France) Team Strasbourg	12–8	10–13 (p)

==== First leg ====
30 Oct 2019; 15:00	Report	CC Ortigia (Italy)	9–9	(Greece) NC Vouliagmeni	Piscina Paolo Caldarella (Syracuse); Referees: Bura (CRO), Dervieux (FRA)
30 Oct 2019; 15:00	Report	Score by quarters: 2–3, 3–2, 1–3, 3–1			Piscina Paolo Caldarella (Syracuse); Referees: Bura (CRO), Dervieux (FRA)
30 Oct 2019; 15:00	Report	3: Gallo, Rossi; 2: Giacoppo	Goals	3: Pontikeas; 2: Kalogeropoulos	Piscina Paolo Caldarella (Syracuse); Referees: Bura (CRO), Dervieux (FRA)

30 Oct 2019; 18:00	Report	CSM Oradea (Romania)	12–9	(Spain) CN Mataró	Bazinul Olimpic Ioan Alexandrescu (Oradea); Referees: Berishvili (GEO), Mišković (MNE)
30 Oct 2019; 18:00	Report	Score by quarters: 2–3, 2–2, 5–1, 3–3			Bazinul Olimpic Ioan Alexandrescu (Oradea); Referees: Berishvili (GEO), Mišković (MNE)
30 Oct 2019; 18:00	Report	4: Inada; 3: Georgescu	Goals	5: Yañez; 2: de Freitas	Bazinul Olimpic Ioan Alexandrescu (Oradea); Referees: Berishvili (GEO), Mišković (MNE)

30 Oct 2019; 18:00	Report	Egri VK (Hungary)	12–8	(France) Team Strasbourg	Bitskey Aladár Uszoda (Eger); Referees: Putniković (SRB), Dutilh-Dumas (NED)
30 Oct 2019; 18:00	Report	Score by quarters: 3–1, 2–4, 4–3, 3–0			Bitskey Aladár Uszoda (Eger); Referees: Putniković (SRB), Dutilh-Dumas (NED)
30 Oct 2019; 18:00	Report	4: Rašović; 3: Hosnyánszky, Murišić	Goals	4: Marković	Bitskey Aladár Uszoda (Eger); Referees: Putniković (SRB), Dutilh-Dumas (NED)

30 Oct 2019; 20:30	Report	AN Brescia (Italy)	17–10	(Hungary) MVLC Miskolc	Centro Natatorio di Mompiano (Brescia); Referees: Shopp (GER), Stavdridis (GRE)
30 Oct 2019; 20:30	Report	Score by quarters: 4–1, 4–2, 6–3, 3–4			Centro Natatorio di Mompiano (Brescia); Referees: Shopp (GER), Stavdridis (GRE)
30 Oct 2019; 20:30	Report	6: Cannella; 3: C. Presciutti	Goals	3: Nagy; 2: Vadovics	Centro Natatorio di Mompiano (Brescia); Referees: Shopp (GER), Stavdridis (GRE)

==== Second leg ====
9 Nov 2019; 12:00	Report	CN Mataró (Spain)	10–8	(Romania) CSM Oradea	Piscina Joan Serra (Mataró); Referees: Spanoudis (GRE), Dervieux (FRA)
9 Nov 2019; 12:00	Report	Score by quarters: 3–1, 3–2, 2–3, 2–2			Piscina Joan Serra (Mataró); Referees: Spanoudis (GRE), Dervieux (FRA)
9 Nov 2019; 12:00	Report	3: de Freitas	Goals	2: Dragomirescu, Popoviciu	Piscina Joan Serra (Mataró); Referees: Spanoudis (GRE), Dervieux (FRA)

9 Nov 2019; 15:00	Report	NC Vouliagmeni (Greece)	6–7	(Italy) CC Ortigia	Vouliagmeni Nautical Club (Vouliagmeni); Referees: Kun (HUN), Putniković (SRB)
9 Nov 2019; 15:00	Report	Score by quarters: 3–3, 2–2, 0–0, 1–2			Vouliagmeni Nautical Club (Vouliagmeni); Referees: Kun (HUN), Putniković (SRB)
9 Nov 2019; 15:00	Report	2: Gkiouvetsis	Goals	2: Vidović, Napolitano	Vouliagmeni Nautical Club (Vouliagmeni); Referees: Kun (HUN), Putniković (SRB)

9 Nov 2019; 19:00	Report	MVLC Miskolc (Hungary)	10–11	(Italy) AN Brescia	Kemény Dénes Városi Sportuszoda (Miskolc); Referees: Buch (ESP), Birakis (GRE)
9 Nov 2019; 19:00	Report	Score by quarters: 2–2, 1–1, 3–5, 4–3			Kemény Dénes Városi Sportuszoda (Miskolc); Referees: Buch (ESP), Birakis (GRE)
9 Nov 2019; 19:00	Report	3: Vadovics; 2: Kriještorac, Stojanović	Goals	5: Cannella; 2: Alesiani, Nikolaidis	Kemény Dénes Városi Sportuszoda (Miskolc); Referees: Buch (ESP), Birakis (GRE)

9 Nov 2019; 20:30	Report	Team Strasbourg (France)	10–6 ^{(13–10 PSO)} (PSO)	(Hungary) Egri VK	Piscine de la Kibitzenau (Strasbourg); Referees: Stavridis (GRE), Franulović (CRO)
9 Nov 2019; 20:30	Report	Score by quarters: 2–2, 3–0, 3–3, 2–1 PSO: 3–4			Piscine de la Kibitzenau (Strasbourg); Referees: Stavridis (GRE), Franulović (CRO)
9 Nov 2019; 20:30	Report	3: Bratić; 2: Babić, Marković	Goals	2: Rašović	Piscine de la Kibitzenau (Strasbourg); Referees: Stavridis (GRE), Franulović (CRO)

=== Semifinals ===
The draw for the semifinals took place on 12 November 2019.

Team 1	Agg.	Team 2	1st leg	2nd leg
AN Brescia (Italy)	–	(Hungary) Egri VK	6–3	TBD^{1}
CSM Oradea (Romania)	12–23	(Italy) CC Ortigia	4–10	8–13

==== First leg ====
22 Feb 2020; 19:00 (UTC+1)	Report	AN Brescia (Italy)	6–3	(Hungary) Egri VK	Centro Natatorio di Mompiano (Brescia); Referees: Savinović (CRO), Naumov (RUS)
22 Feb 2020; 19:00 (UTC+1)	Report	Score by quarters: 0–1, 2–0, 0–0, 4–2			Centro Natatorio di Mompiano (Brescia); Referees: Savinović (CRO), Naumov (RUS)
22 Feb 2020; 19:00 (UTC+1)	Report	2: Cannella, Nikolaidis; 1: Alesiani, Buha	Goals	2: Murisić; 1: Hosnyánszky	Centro Natatorio di Mompiano (Brescia); Referees: Savinović (CRO), Naumov (RUS)

22 Feb 2020; 18:00 (UTC+2)	Report	CSM Oradea (Romania)	4–10	(Italy) CC Ortigia	Bazinul Olimpic Ioan Alexandrescu (Oradea); Referees: Margeta (SLO), Vogel (HUN)
22 Feb 2020; 18:00 (UTC+2)	Report	Score by quarters: 1–1, 1–4, 1–4, 1–1			Bazinul Olimpic Ioan Alexandrescu (Oradea); Referees: Margeta (SLO), Vogel (HUN)
22 Feb 2020; 18:00 (UTC+2)	Report	2: Inaba; 1: Colodrovschi, Remeș	Goals	3: Napolitano; 2: Gallo	Bazinul Olimpic Ioan Alexandrescu (Oradea); Referees: Margeta (SLO), Vogel (HUN)

==== Second leg ====
4 Mar 2020; 20:00 (UTC+1)	Report	CC Ortigia (Italy)	13–8	(Romania) CSM Oradea	Piscina di Nesima (Catania)^{2} Referees: Naumov (RUS), Ortega (ESP)
4 Mar 2020; 20:00 (UTC+1)	Report	Score by quarters: 2–0, 5–2, 2–2, 4–4			Piscina di Nesima (Catania)^{2} Referees: Naumov (RUS), Ortega (ESP)
4 Mar 2020; 20:00 (UTC+1)	Report	4: Gallo; 3: Giacoppo	Goals	2: Popoviciu, Colodrovschi; 1: four players	Piscina di Nesima (Catania)^{2} Referees: Naumov (RUS), Ortega (ESP)

TBD^{1}	Report	Egri VK (Hungary)	–	(Italy) AN Brescia	Bitskey Aladár Uszoda (Eger)

^{1}The second leg of the game was originally scheduled for 4 March 2020 but it was postponed because Hungarian pools were in lockdown due to the coronavirus pandemic.
^{2}Ortigia played the home game in the near Catania due to the impossibility of Syracuse's "Paolo Caldarella" swimming pool to host international evening matches during winter time.

== See also ==
- 2019–20 LEN Champions League
- 2019 LEN Super Cup
