= Kreković =

Kreković is a Croatian surname that may refer to the following notable people:

- Joško Kreković (born 1969), Croatian former water polo player and coach
- Karlo Kreković (born 1999), Croatian water polo player, son of Joško
- Kristian Kreković (1901–1985), Croatian painter
- Leon Kreković (born 2000), Croatian football forward
