= Golfo Paradiso =

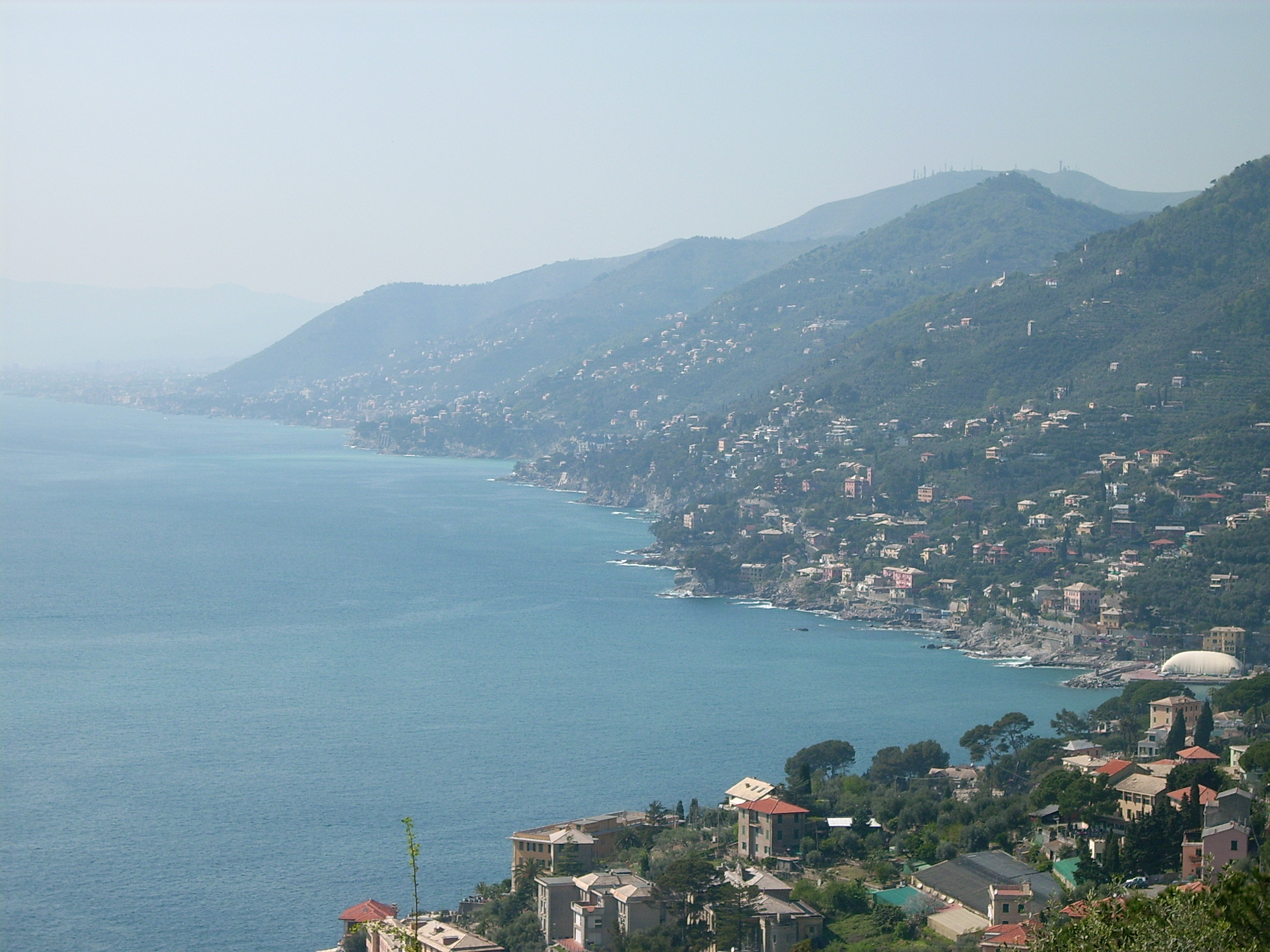
- View of Golfo Paradiso
- Interactive map of Golfo Paradiso
- Location: Ligurian Sea
- Coordinates: 44.36°N 9.08°E
- Type: Gulf
- Basin countries: Italy
- Settlements: Bogliasco, Pieve Ligure, Sori, Recco, Camogli

Golfo Paradiso (English: Paradise Gulf) is a gulf on the Ligurian Sea in the Liguria region of northwestern Italy. It lies along the Italian Riviera between Genoa and the Portofino.
