= Bogliasco =

Bogliasco Boggiasco
- Comune
- Comune di Bogliasco
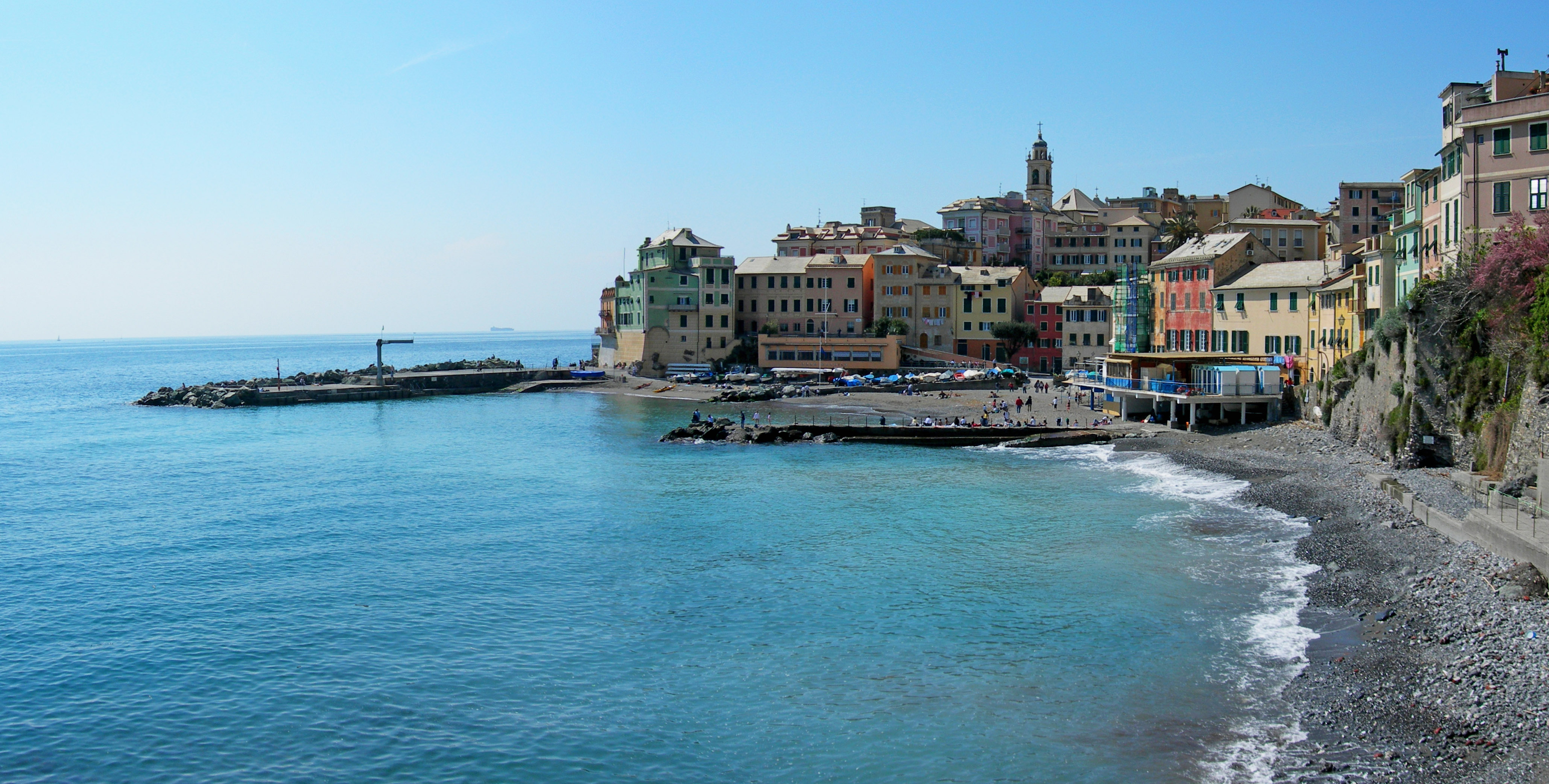

- Coat of arms

- Location within Italy Location within Liguria
- Coordinates: 44°23′N 9°4′E
- Country: Italy
- Region: Liguria
- Metropolitan city: Genoa (GE)
- Frazioni: Poggio, San Bernardo, Sessarego

Government
  - Mayor: Luca Pastorino

Area
  - Total: 4.42 km^{2} (1.71 sq mi)
- Elevation: 25 m (82 ft)

Population (30 April 2017)
  - Total: 4,475
  - Density: 1,010/km^{2} (2,620/sq mi)
- Demonym: Bogliaschini
- Time zone: UTC+1 (CET)
  - Summer (DST): UTC+2 (CEST)
- Postal code: 16031
- Dialing code: 010
- Patron saint: Madonna del Carmine
- Saint day: July 16
- Website: Official website

Bogliasco (Ligurian: Boggiasco) is a comune (municipality) in the Metropolitan City of Genoa in the Italian region Liguria, located about 11 kilometres (7 mi) southeast of Genoa. Together with the comuni of Camogli, Recco, Pieve Ligure and Sori, it is part of the so-called Golfo Paradiso. Economy is mostly based on tourism; agriculture include production of olives.

Bogliasco borders the following municipalities: Genoa, Pieve Ligure, and Sori.

== History ==
As archaeological findings proved, the area of Bogliasco was inhabited since Paleolithic and Mesolithic times. The evidence of the Roman presence was found on the slopes of Mount Cordona, finds dating back to the Roman imperial era have been found, confirming the hypothesis that even then the path that from Fontanabuona Valley headed towards the Riviera was used as a transit place by Roman legions. Another testimony of the Roman presence can be found in the so-called "Roman" bridge which crosses the stream almost at its outfall. The current construction dates back to the 13th century AD, but radical restructuring was carried out in the 17th century.

After the fall of the Western Roman Empire and the Byzantine and Lombard domination, Liguria was conquered by Charlemagne; the burgh of Bogliasco fell under the Republic of Genoa after the year 1182, suffering numerous raids from Saracen pirates. The town was destroyed by Venetian galleys in 1432.

After the French domination, Bogliasco, together with the whole Liguria, was annexed to the Kingdom of Sardinia, and then to the newly unified Kingdom of Italy in 1861.

== Main sights ==
- Church of Natività di Maria Santissima, dating from the 12th century but rebuilt in 1731–37 by architect Antonio Maria Ricca.
- Church of the Brethren of Santa Chiara, from 1403.
- Church of N.S. della Neve e dell'Ascensione di Gesù Cristo, in the frazione of Sassarego (dating from the early 17th century). It has some paintings from the 18th century by the Genoese school.
- Church of San Bernardo, in the eponymous frazione.
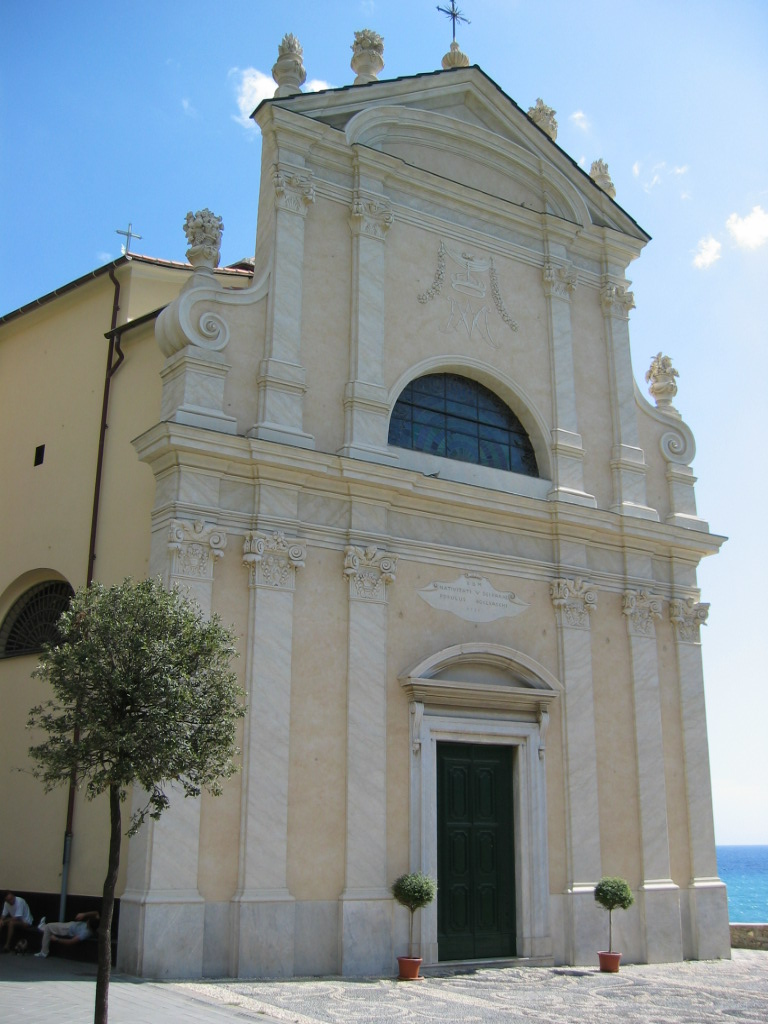
Church of Natività di Maria Santissima

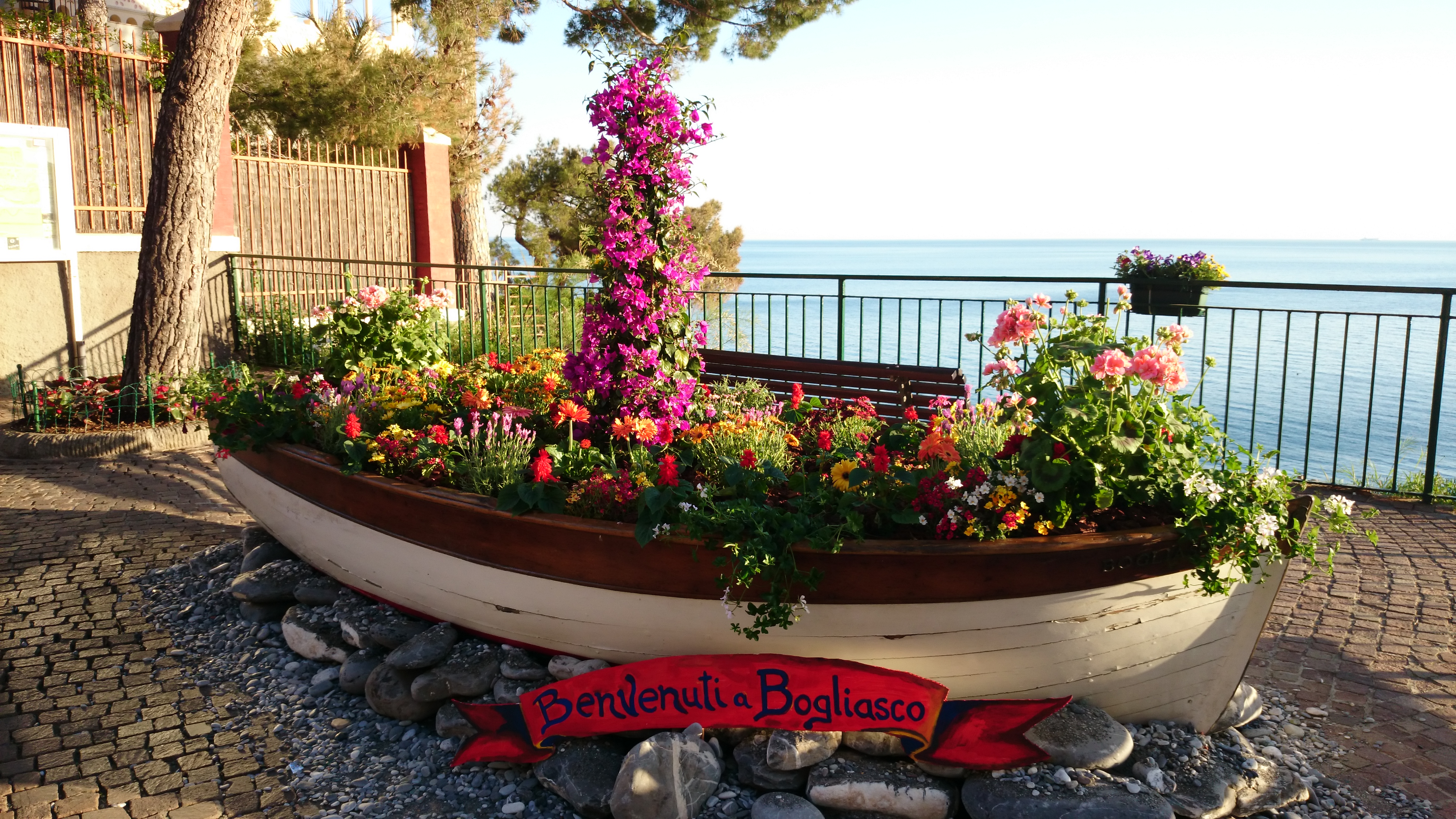
Bogliasco belvedere Euroflora 2018

== Transport ==
Bogliasco has a railway station on the line Pisa-La Spezia-Genoa; nearby there is a gate on the A12 Motorway connecting Rome to Genoa. The other main road is the modern Via Aurelia.
