= Szolnoki =

Szolnoki is a surname. Notable people with the surname include:

- Mária Szolnoki (born 1947), Hungarian fencer
- Olivér Szolnoki (born 1997), Hungarian pool player
- Roland Szolnoki (born 1992), Hungarian football player

== See also ==
- Szolnoki MÁV FC, Hungarian football club, from the city of Szolnok
- Szolnoki Olajbányász, professional basketball team based in Szolnok, Hungary
- 2019–20 Szolnoki Vízilabda SC season, Szolnoki Dózsa's 99th year in existence as a water polo club
- Szolnoki Vízilabda SC, professional water polo team based Szolnok, Hungary
- Szolnoki Légierő SK, Hungarian football club from the town of Szolnok, Hungary
- Szolnok
