= Karlo Erak =

Croatian water polo player

Personal information
- Nationality: Croatian
- Born: 19 April 1995 (age 31) Šibenik, Croatia
- Height: 6 ft 1 in (1.85 m)
- Weight: 205 lb (93 kg)

Sport
- Country: Croatia
- Sport: Water polo
- Club: VK Solaris

Karlo Erak (born April 19, 1995) is a Croatian professional water polo player. He is a former player of VK Solaris. He is 6 ft 1 in (1.85 m) tall and weighs 205 lb (93 kg). His brother, Vice Erak, is also water polo player.
