= Sori, Liguria =

Sori Söi
- Comune
- Comune di Sori
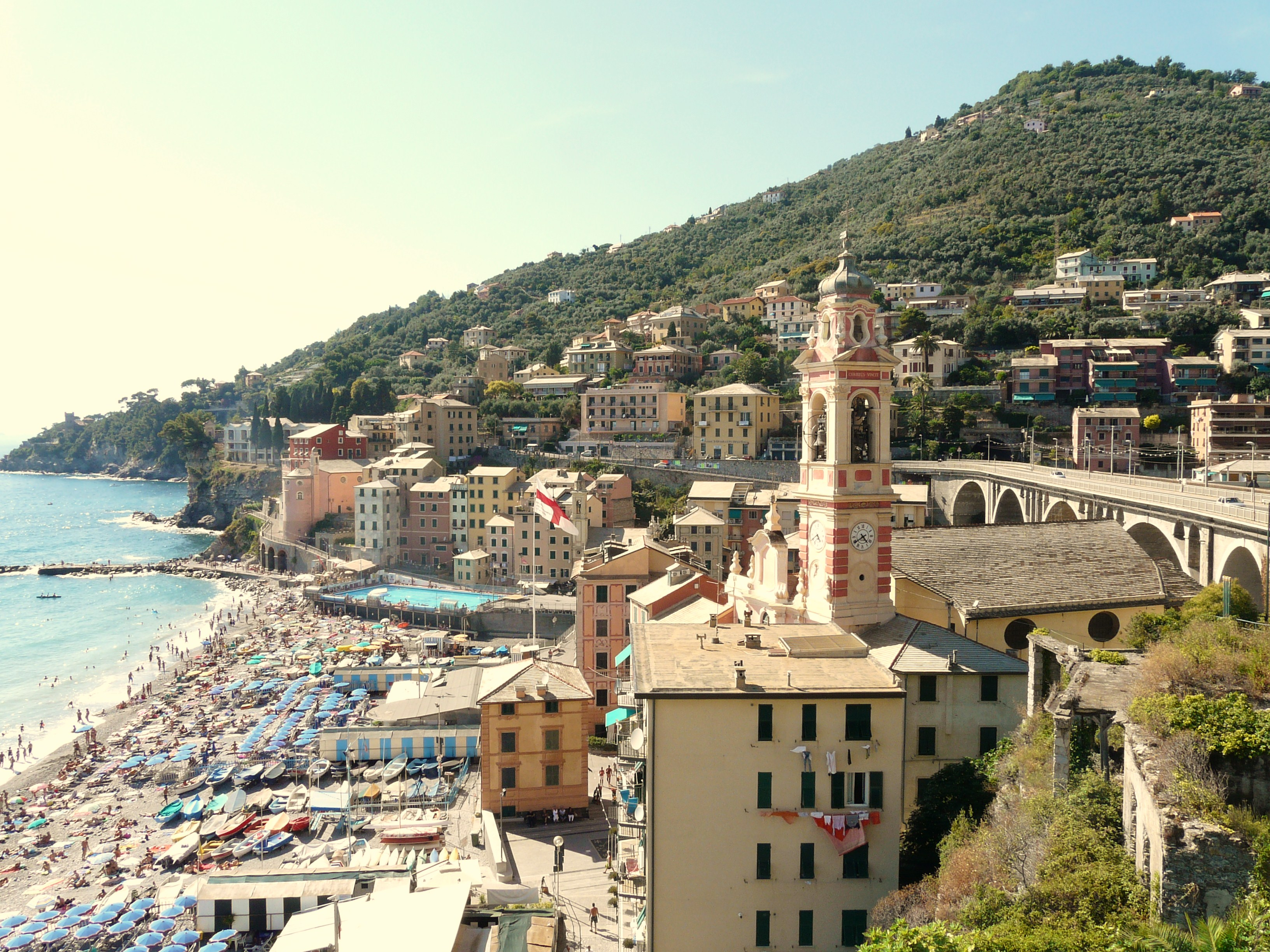

- Flag Coat of arms

- Location within Italy Location within Liguria
- Coordinates: 44°22′22″N 9°6′16″E
- Country: Italy
- Region: Liguria
- Metropolitan city: Genoa (GE)
- Frazioni: Canepa, Capreno, Lago, Levà, Polanesi, San Bartolomeo di Busonengo, Sant’Apollinare, Sussisa, Teriasca

Government
  - Mayor: Mario Reffo

Area
  - Total: 13.07 km^{2} (5.05 sq mi)
- Elevation: 14 m (46 ft)

Population (31 May 2022)
  - Total: 4,003
  - Density: 306.3/km^{2} (793.2/sq mi)
- Demonym: Soresi
- Time zone: UTC+1 (CET)
  - Summer (DST): UTC+2 (CEST)
- Postal code: 16031
- Dialing code: 0185
- Patron saint: Santa Margherita d'Antiochia
- Saint day: July 20
- Website: Official website

Sori (Ligurian: Söi) is a comune (municipality) in the Metropolitan City of Genoa in the Italian region Liguria, located about 17 kilometres (11 mi) southeast of Genoa. Together with Camogli, Pieve Ligure, Bogliasco, and Recco, it is part of the so-called Golfo Paradiso in the Riviera di Levante. Its economy is based on tourism and production of olives.

The municipality of Sori contains the frazioni (subdivisions, mainly villages and hamlets) Canepa, Capreno, Lago, Levà, Polanesi, San Bartolomeo di Busonengo, Sant’Apollinare, Sussisa, and Teriasca.

Sori borders the following municipalities: Avegno, Bargagli, Bogliasco, Genoa, Lumarzo, Pieve Ligure, Recco, and Uscio.

== History ==
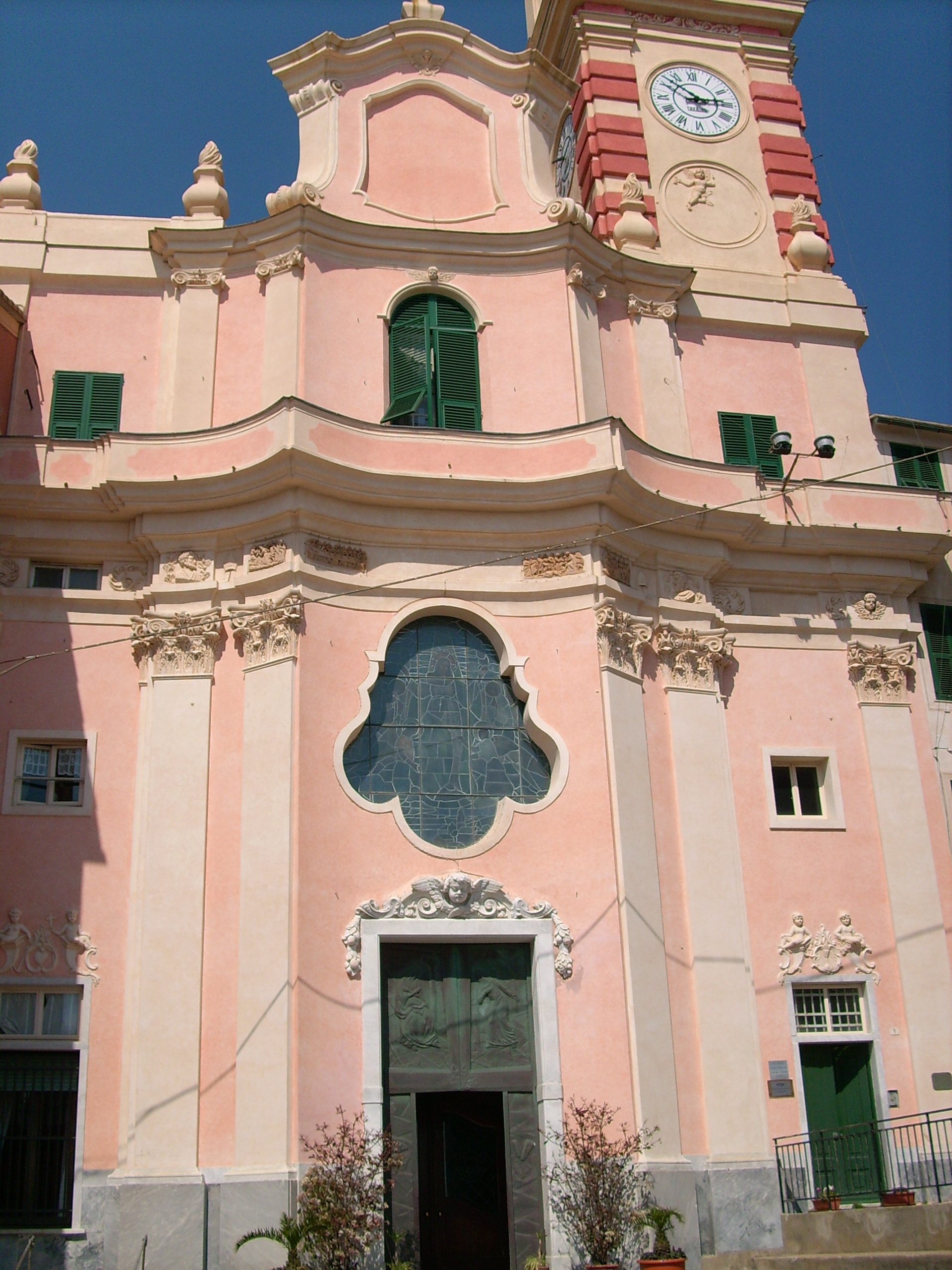
Church of Santa Margherita

According to some theories, Sori was founded by Greek immigrants around the 7th century BC. Most likely, the small port was also used by the Romans, although the first mention of the town dates to the early Middle Ages, when it was a possession of the bishops of Milan; later, it was part of the Republic of Genoa.

In 1584, the town was sacked and ravaged by 1500 pirates from North Africa. After the French domination in 1815, Sori became part of the Kingdom of Sardinia and, from 1861, was part of the unified Kingdom of Italy.
