= Mulinetti =

- Neighbourhood
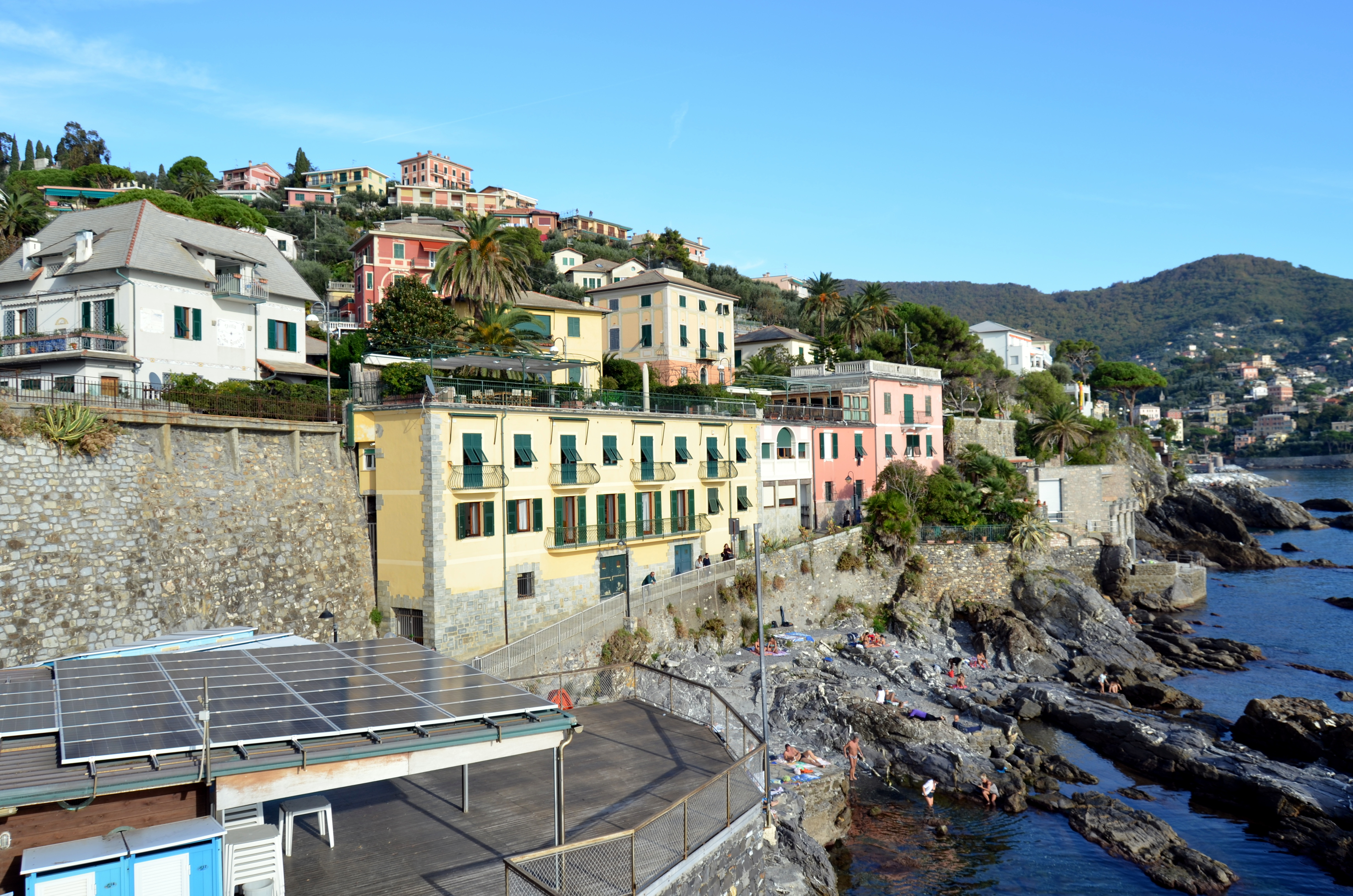
- Mulinetti as seen from the sea shore
- Interactive map of Mulinetti
- Coordinates: 44.3629122°N 9.1300051°E
- Country: Italy
- Region: Liguria
- Province: Genoa
- Comune: Recco
- Elevation: 5 m (16 ft)
- Highest elevation: 436 m (1,430 ft)
- Lowest elevation: 0 m (0 ft)
- Demonym: mulinettesi
- Time zone: UTC+1
  - Summer (DST): UTC+2
- Postal code: 16036
- Area code: 0185

Mulinetti is a neighbourhood and frazione in the commune of Recco in the province of Genova in Liguria, Italy. Mulinetti is located to the west of the town adjacent to the border with Sori. It is considered the wealthy hamlet of Recco as there are many small villas with spectacular sea views. Besides the elegance of its residential buildings, it is also known abroad for its beautiful pebble beach. Situated on the slopes of the Megli hill, Mulinetti is the site of two oil mills for the mostly non-commercial production of olive oil.

Mulinetti is mostly a group of villas located upon a cliffside with a large, lush forest located further up the cliff. Mulinetti has been labelled as a "peaceful oasis where travellers can immerse themselves in the azure blue of the sea and the emerald green of the pines, breathing in a fragrant sea scent while sunbathing close to the water’s edge. During winter the place lacks any tourism and becomes a calm, quaint community".

== Geography ==
=== Physical Geography ===
Mulinetti is located on the coast of the Ligurian Riviera in the Metropolitan City of Genoa between Genoa and Rapallo. Mulinetti is on the slopes of Poggio Montone and Monte Castelletto.

=== Anthropic Geography ===
Via Aurelia runs along the coastline directly through Mulinetti the section through the east of the frazione is named Via Cavour while the west is named Via Christopher Colombo.

== History ==
The place was likely founded in the Middle Ages, when the first settlements of Benedictine monks were formed along the Ligurian Riviera, who spread the cultivation of olive oil and vines; the place name evokes the presence of two hydraulic mills, located in the valley of the Sonega river, used to drive the millstones and the presses of the oil mills; the latter are still present but are powered by electricity.

== Architecture ==
=== Religious Architecture ===
Mulinetti is home to a chapel built in the early 1960s, the church of All Saints has a gabled façade, with two projecting side covers that allow the entrance to open into a canopy. Internally, it is a hall with a flat-ended presbytery. Between 1958 and 1960 the property was founded and construction began shortly after. The church was built by engineer Gianfranco Gozzi. The roofs are pitched and covered with Marseille tiles while the floors are covered with regular tiles.

In addition in the vicinity of Mulinetti there's another church the Church of San Martino which is located atop the road "via Polanesi" and officially is within the hamlet of Polenesi.

== Real Estate ==
Mulinetti is home to a variety of housing developments, houses are sold frequently in the area with a large range of prices from as little as 100,000 Euros to over 5 million.
