= Štrkalj =

Štrkalj is a surname. Notable people with the surname include:

- Nikola Štrkalj (born 1998), Croatian water polo player
- Tomislav Štrkalj (born 1996), Croatian footballer
