= Renato Vrbičić =

Croatian water polo player

Personal information
- Nationality: Croatia
- Born: 21 November 1970 Šibenik, SR Croatia, SFR Yugoslavia
- Died: 12 June 2018 (aged 47) Šibenik, Croatia

Sport
- Sport: Water polo

Senior clubs
- Years: Team
- 1987–1990 1991–1992 1992–1995 1995 1995–1997 1997–2000 2000–2001 2001–2002 2002–2003 2003–2004 2004–2005: VK Šibenik; Jadran Split; VK Šibenik; Mladost Zagreb; VK Šibenik; Mladost Zagreb; Jadran Split; Mladost Zagreb; Catania; Civitavecchia; VK Šibenik NCP
National team
- Years: Team
- 1996: Croatia

Teams coached
- –: VK Adriatic (assistant)
- –: Croatia (juniors; assistant)
- 2015–2018: VK Solaris
Medal record
Representing Croatia
Men's water polo
Olympic Games
Silver medal – second place	1996 Atlanta	Team

Renato Vrbičić (21 November 1970 – 12 June 2018) was a Croatian professional water polo player and coach who was a member of the senior Croatia national team, that won the silver medal at the 1996 Summer Olympics held in Atlanta.

He died in a sleep at his home in Šibenik on 12 June 2018, due to a heart attack. He was buried in his hometown on 14 June 2018.

== Playing career ==
As a player, Vrbičić spent most of his career with hometown club VK Šibenik. He was a part of the senior Croatia national team at the 1996 Summer Olympics held in Atlanta, where they have won the silver medal.

== Coaching career ==
After he finished his playing career, Vrbičić worked as an assistant coach of the junior men's Croatia national team and as assistant coach to his former teammate Denis Šupe at VK Adriatic bench.

In 2015, Vrbičić was appointed as the head coach of the newly formed VK Solaris. In June 2018, following his death, Joško Kreković replaced him.

== See also ==
- List of Olympic medalists in water polo (men)
