= Ivan Jukić =

Ivan Jukić may refer to:

- Ivan Jukić (footballer)
- Ivan Jukić (rower)
- Ivan Jukić (water polo)
- Ivan Franjo Jukić (1818–1857), Bosnian writer and Franciscan frier
