= 2019–20 Szolnoki Vízilabda SC season =

Szolnoki Dózsa
2019–20 season
- Chairman: Zoltán Mohi
- Manager: Živko Gocić

The 2019–20 season will be Szolnoki Dózsa's 99th year in existence as a water polo club.

== Competitions ==
=== Overview ===
Win Draw Loss

Competition	First match	Last match	Starting round	Final position	Record							
Competition	First match	Last match	Starting round	Final position	Pld	W	D	L	GF	GA	GD	Win %
Országos Bajnokság I	4 September 2019		Matchday 1		10	7	2	1	321	257	+64	70.00
Magyar Kupa	25 October 2019	7 December 2019	Quarter-finals	Final four	3	1	1	1	29	32	−3	33.33
LEN Champions League	8 October 2019		Preliminary round		6	2	1	3	167	180	−13	33.33
Total					19	10	4	5	517	469	+48	52.63

Last updated: 3 February 2020
Source: Competitions

=== Hungarian Cup ===
==== Quarter-finals ====
25 October 2019; 19:00	Report	Szolnoki Dózsa	11–11	ZF-Eger	Tiszaligeti Pool, Szolnok; Referees: Berki, Csizmadia
25 October 2019; 19:00	Report	Score by quarters: 3–2, 3–4, 2–3, 3–2			Tiszaligeti Pool, Szolnok; Referees: Berki, Csizmadia
25 October 2019; 19:00	Report	Drašović 5	Goals	Gyárfás 5	Tiszaligeti Pool, Szolnok; Referees: Berki, Csizmadia

26 October 2019; 16:00	Report	ZF-Eger	8–10	Szolnoki Dózsa	Aladár Bitskey Swimming Pool, Eger; Referees: Homonnai, Kun
26 October 2019; 16:00	Report	Score by quarters: 0–3, 3–3, 2–2, 3–2			Aladár Bitskey Swimming Pool, Eger; Referees: Homonnai, Kun
26 October 2019; 16:00	Report	Hosnyánszky 3	Goals	Bátori, Subotić 2	Aladár Bitskey Swimming Pool, Eger; Referees: Homonnai, Kun

Szolnoki Dózsa won, 21–19 on aggregate.

==== Final four ====
The final four was held on 7 and 8 December 2019 at the Császár-Komjádi Swimming Stadium in Budapest, II. ker.

Semi-finals
7 December, 19:00
A-HÍD OSC Újbuda	11
PannErgy-Miskolci VLC	9
7 December, 17:30
FTC-Telekom	13
Szolnoki Dózsa	8

Final
8 December, 16:00
A-HÍD OSC Újbuda	7
FTC-Telekom	8

Semi-final

7 December 2019; 17:30	Report	FTC-Telekom	13–8	Szolnoki Dózsa	Császár-Komjádi Swimming Pool, Budapest; Referees: Kun, Tóth
7 December 2019; 17:30	Report	Score by quarters: 5–0, 3–1, 1–4, 4–3			Császár-Komjádi Swimming Pool, Budapest; Referees: Kun, Tóth
7 December 2019; 17:30	Report	Varga, Fountoulis 3	Goals	Várnai, Subotić 2	Császár-Komjádi Swimming Pool, Budapest; Referees: Kun, Tóth

=== LEN Champions League ===
==== Preliminary round ====
Pos	Team	Pld	W	D	L	GF	GA	GD	Pts	Qualification	(Spain) BAR	(Greece) OLY	(Croatia) JUG	(Hungary) SZO	(Montenegro) JHN	(Germany) S04	(Croatia) JST	(Russia) SIN
1	(Spain) CNA Barceloneta	8	6	1	1	111	85	+26	19	Final 8	—	11–11	9 May	14–10	4 Mar	20 May	16–12	11 Apr
2	(Greece) Olympiacos	8	6	1	1	82	67	+15	19	Final 8	22 Feb	—	6–5	11 Apr	8–7	13–8	20 May	10–8
3	(Croatia) Jug Dubrovnik	8	6	0	2	100	75	+25	18	Final 8	15–13	13–9	—	14–11	20 May	12–7	11 Apr	18–10
4	(Hungary) Szolnok	8	4	0	4	81	80	+1	12	Final 8	22 Apr	7–8	22 Feb	—	9 May	7–8	5–4	13–10
5	(Montenegro) Jadran Herceg Novi	8	3	1	4	86	82	+4	10		12–13	22 Apr	7–12	12–14	—	11 Apr	22 Feb	12–9
6	(Germany) Spandau 04	8	2	2	4	74	89	−15	8		8–11	4 Mar	22 Apr	10–14	9–9	—	9 May	22 Feb
7	(Croatia) Jadran Split	8	1	1	6	70	102	−32	4		5–13	8–17	12–11	4 Mar	6–12	12–12	—	22 Apr
8	(Russia) Sintez Kazan	8	1	0	7	87	111	−24	3		12–20	9 May	4 Mar	20 May	11–15	11–12	16–11	—

Updated to match(es) played on unknown. Source: LEN

===== Matches =====
8 October 2019; 19:00	Report	Szolnoki Dózsa	13–10	(Russia) Sintez Kazan	Tiszaligeti Pool, Szolnok; Referees: Boudramis (GRE), Colombo (ITA)
8 October 2019; 19:00	Report	Score by quarters: 3–3, 4–3, 3–2, 3–2			Tiszaligeti Pool, Szolnok; Referees: Boudramis (GRE), Colombo (ITA)
8 October 2019; 19:00	Report	Subotić 3	Goals	Lazarev, Lisunov 2	Tiszaligeti Pool, Szolnok; Referees: Boudramis (GRE), Colombo (ITA)

18 October 2019; 18:00	Report	Jadran Carine (Montenegro)	12–14	Szolnoki Dózsa	Institute Igalo Pool, Herceg Novi; Referees: Alexandrescu (ROU), Putniković (SRB)
18 October 2019; 18:00	Report	Score by quarters: 3–4, 4–4, 1–4, 4–2			Institute Igalo Pool, Herceg Novi; Referees: Alexandrescu (ROU), Putniković (SRB)
18 October 2019; 18:00	Report	Radović 3	Goals	Subotić 4	Institute Igalo Pool, Herceg Novi; Referees: Alexandrescu (ROU), Putniković (SRB)

29 October 2019; 18:00	Report	Zodiac CNAB (Spain)	14–10	Szolnoki Dózsa	Sant Sebastià Pool, Barcelona; Referees: Margeta (SLO), De Jong (NED)
29 October 2019; 18:00	Report	Score by quarters: 3–4, 5–2, 2–2, 4–2			Sant Sebastià Pool, Barcelona; Referees: Margeta (SLO), De Jong (NED)
29 October 2019; 18:00	Report	Granados 5	Goals	three players 2	Sant Sebastià Pool, Barcelona; Referees: Margeta (SLO), De Jong (NED)

8 November 2019; 19:00	Report	Szolnoki Dózsa	7–8	(Greece) Olympiacos Piraeus	Tiszaligeti Pool, Szolnok; Referees: Gomez (ESP), Periš (CRO)
8 November 2019; 19:00	Report	Score by quarters: 2–3, 3–3, 1–2, 1–0			Tiszaligeti Pool, Szolnok; Referees: Gomez (ESP), Periš (CRO)
8 November 2019; 19:00	Report	Drašović 3	Goals	Mylonakis, Mitrović 2	Tiszaligeti Pool, Szolnok; Referees: Gomez (ESP), Periš (CRO)

19 November 2019; 19:00	Report	Szolnoki Dózsa	5–4	(Croatia) Jadran Split	Tiszaligeti Pool, Szolnok; Referees: Gomez (GER), Teixido (ESP)
19 November 2019; 19:00	Report	Score by quarters: 1–0, 2–1, 2-1, 0–2			Tiszaligeti Pool, Szolnok; Referees: Gomez (GER), Teixido (ESP)
19 November 2019; 19:00	Report	Anygal 2	Goals	Butić 4	Tiszaligeti Pool, Szolnok; Referees: Gomez (GER), Teixido (ESP)
