= Toni Šparada =

Croatian water polo player

Personal information
- Nationality: Croatian
- Born: 25 August 2000 (age 25) Šibenik, Croatia
- Height: 1.90 m (6 ft 3 in)
- Weight: 91 kg (201 lb)

Sport
- Country: Croatia
- Sport: Water polo
- Club: VK Solaris

Toni Šparada (born 25 August 2000) is a Croatian professional water polo player. He is currently playing for VK Solaris. He is 6 ft 3 in (1.90 m) tall and weighs 201 lb (91 kg). His brother, Marin Šparada, is also water polo player.
