= Marin Šparada =

Croatian water polo player

Personal information
- Nationality: Croatian
- Born: 6 September 1996 (age 29) Šibenik, Croatia
- Height: 1.98 m (6 ft 6 in)
- Weight: 102 kg (225 lb)

Sport
- Country: Croatia
- Sport: Water polo
- Club: VK Solaris

Marin Šparada (born 6 September 1996) is a Croatian professional water polo player. He is currently playing for VK Solaris. He is 6 ft 6 in (1.98 m) tall and weighs 225 lb (102 kg). His brother, Toni Šparada, is also water polo player.
