= VK Šibenik =

Former water polo club in Šibenik, Croatia

Vaterpolski klub Šibenik
- Full name: Vaterpolski klub Šibenik
- Founded: 6 August 1924; 102 years ago
- Dissolved: August 2015; 11 years ago
- Team history: PSK Krka (1924–1953); VK Solaris (1953–2006); VK Šibenik (2006–2015)
- Based in: Šibenik, Croatia
- Arena: Bazen Solaris (1953–2002; capacity: 200); Bazen Crnica (2006–2015; capacity: 400)
- Colours

Vaterpolski klub Šibenik (English: Šibenik Water Polo Club), commonly known as VK Šibenik or simply Šibenik, was a men's professional water polo club from the town on the Croatian coast called Šibenik. Club offices were on address Prilaz tvornici BB.

== History ==
The club was part of the Croatian First League for many years. Until 2002 the club played their home matches on the pool in Solaris (10 km from Šibenik) but then the pool was closed and there was a big break which took a part on the club. Finally, in fall 2006 the new pool in Crnica was built and the club started to advance. With the arrival of new sponsors Nautical Center Prgin the club changed its name to Šibenik NCP. Club was dissolved in August 2015 and by merging VK Adriatic and VK Šibenik, a new water polo club VK Solaris was founded.

== Honours ==
Although it never won a championship, the club was a tough rival to all other clubs. Also, many players from Šibenik were in national teams or they were in state champions.

The best success accomplished in the 2006–07 season when it secured second place in the LEN Euro Cup and third one in the Croatian Championship, leading by coach Ivica Tucak, present-day Croatia men's national water polo team head coach.

Also, one of the biggest successes include winning the second place in the 1986–87 Yugoslav Water Polo Championship season while in the 2008–09 season the club played LEN Euroleague, the strongest water polo competition under the auspices of LEN.

== Notable players ==
- (Croatia) Siniša Belamarić
- (Croatia) Perica Bukić
- (Croatia) Andrija Komadina
- (United States) Merrill Moses
- (Croatia) Mile Nakić
- (Croatia) Antonio Petković
- (Croatia) Ivica Tucak
- (Croatia) Renato Vrbičić

== Notable coaches ==
- (Croatia) Danko Jerković
- (Croatia) Mile Nakić
- (Croatia) Toni Petrić
- (Croatia) Ivica Tucak
- (Croatia) Renato Vrbičić
