= Ferdinand Bušelić =

Croatian water polo player

Personal information
- Nationality: Croatian
- Born: 25 January 1998 (age 28) Split, Croatia
- Height: 1.95 m (6 ft 5 in)
- Weight: 90 kg (198 lb)

Sport
- Country: Croatia
- Sport: Water polo
- Club: VK Solaris

Ferdinand Bušelić (born 25 January 1998) is a Croatian water polo player. He is currently playing for VK Solaris. He is 6 ft 5 in (1.95 m) tall and weighs 198 lb (90 kg).
