= 2019–20 LEN Champions League =

Water polo sports season

- League: LEN Champions League
- Sport: Water Polo
- Duration: 30 August 2019 – 4 March 2020 (canc.)
- Number of teams: 32 (from 14 countries)

Final Eight

Champions League seasons
- ← 2018–19 2020–21 →

The 2019–20 LEN Champions League was the 57th edition of LEN's premier competition for men's water polo clubs. The season started on 30 September 2019 and played its last games on 4 March 2020 due to the COVID-19 pandemic.

== Teams ==
Preliminary round
| (Croatia) Jug Dubrovnik | (Germany) Spandau 04 | (Hungary) Ferencváros |
| (Croatia) Mladost Zagreb | (Germany) Waspo 98 Hannover | (Italy) Pro Recco |
| (France) CN Marseille | (Greece) Olympiacos | (Montenegro) Jadran Herceg Novi |
| (Georgia (country)) Dinamo Tbilisi | (Hungary) Szolnok | (Spain) CNA Barceloneta |

Qualification round II
| (Croatia) Jadran Split | (Germany) OSC Potsdam | (Italy) AN Brescia |
| (France) Strasbourg | (Greece) NC Vouliagmeni | (Spain) CN Terrassa |
| (Georgia (country)) Locomotive Tbilisi | (Hungary) OSC Budapest | |

Qualification round I
| (Bosnia and Herzegovina) Banja Luka | (Romania) Steaua Bucharest | (Serbia) Crvena zvezda |
| (France) Paix d’Aix Natation | (Russia) Dynamo Moscow | (Spain) CN Barcelona |
| (Greece) Apollon Smyrni | (Russia) Sintez Kazan | (Turkey) Galatasaray |
| (Romania) Oradea | (Serbia) Šabac | (Turkey) Enka |

== Schedule ==
The schedule of the competition is as follows.

| Phase | Round | 1st leg | 2nd leg |
|---|---|---|---|
| Qualifying rounds | Qualification round I | 30 August–1 September 2019 | |
| Qualifying rounds | Qualification round II | 13–15 September 2019 | |
| Qualifying rounds | Qualification round III | 21 September 2019 | 25 September 2019 |
| Preliminary round | Round 1 | 8/9 October 2019 | |
| Preliminary round | Round 2 | 18/19 October 2019 | |
| Preliminary round | Round 3 | 29/30 October 2019 | |
| Preliminary round | Round 4 | 8/9 November 2019 | |
| Preliminary round | Round 5 | 19/20 November 2019 | |
| Preliminary round | Round 6 | 3/4 December 2019 | |
| Preliminary round | Round 7 | 13/14 December 2019 | |
| Preliminary round | Round 8 | 4/5 February 2020 | |
| Preliminary round | Round 9 | 21/22 February 2020 | |
| Preliminary round | Round 10 | 3/4 March 2020 | |
| Preliminary round | Round 11 | 13/14 March 2020 | |
| Preliminary round | Round 12 | 21/22 April 2020 | |
| Preliminary round | Round 13 | 8/9 May 2020 | |
| Preliminary round | Round 14 | 19/20 May 2020 | |
| Final 8 | Quarterfinals | 5 June 2020 | |
| Final 8 | Semifinals | 6 June 2020 | |
| Final 8 | Final | 7 June 2020 | |

== Qualifying rounds ==
=== Qualification round I ===
==== Group A ====
| Pos | Team | Pld | W | D | L | GF | GA | GD | Pts | Qualification | (Serbia) CZB | (Serbia) ŠAB | (Russia) DYN | (Romania) ORA | (Greece) APO | (Turkey) GSK |
|---|---|---|---|---|---|---|---|---|---|---|---|---|---|---|---|---|
| 1 | (Serbia) Crvena zvezda | 5 | 5 | 0 | 0 | 54 | 35 | +19 | 15 | Round II | — | — | 12–10 | 7–6 | 11–7 | 13–2 |
| 2 | (Serbia) Šabac (H) | 5 | 4 | 0 | 1 | 53 | 42 | +11 | 12 | Round II | 10–11 | — | 9–8 | 10–8 | 10–9 | 14–6 |
| 3 | (Russia) Dynamo Moscow | 5 | 3 | 0 | 2 | 54 | 50 | +4 | 9 | Round II | — | — | — | — | 16–15 | 11–6 |
| 4 | (Romania) Oradea | 5 | 2 | 0 | 3 | 42 | 37 | +5 | 6 | Round II | — | — | 8–9 | — | 7–6 | — |
| 5 | (Greece) Apollon Smyrni | 5 | 1 | 0 | 4 | 54 | 52 | +2 | 3 | | — | — | — | — | — | 17–8 |
| 6 | (Turkey) Galatasaray | 6 | 0 | 0 | 6 | 27 | 68 | −41 | 0 | | — | — | — | 5–13 | — | — |

Source: LEN
(H) Hosts

==== Group B ====
| Pos | Team | Pld | W | D | L | GF | GA | GD | Pts | Qualification | (Spain) CNB | (Russia) SIN | (France) AIX | (Romania) STE | (Turkey) ESK | (Bosnia and Herzegovina) BAN |
|---|---|---|---|---|---|---|---|---|---|---|---|---|---|---|---|---|
| 1 | (Spain) CN Barcelona (H) | 5 | 4 | 0 | 1 | 73 | 39 | +34 | 12 | Round II | — | — | — | — | — | — |
| 2 | (Russia) Sintez Kazan | 5 | 4 | 0 | 1 | 92 | 43 | +49 | 12 | Round II | 9–11 | — | — | — | — | 39–1 |
| 3 | (France) Pays d’Aix Natation | 5 | 3 | 0 | 2 | 78 | 38 | +40 | 9 | Round II | 11–12 | 10–12 | — | 8–4 | 11–8 | 38–2 |
| 4 | (Romania) Steaua Bucharest | 5 | 3 | 0 | 2 | 64 | 40 | +24 | 9 | Round II | 8–7 | 9–17 | — | — | 12–7 | 31–1 |
| 5 | (Turkey) Enka | 5 | 1 | 0 | 4 | 57 | 54 | +3 | 3 | | 9–14 | 12–15 | — | — | — | — |
| 6 | (Bosnia and Herzegovina) Banja Luka | 5 | 0 | 0 | 5 | 8 | 158 | −150 | 0 | | 2–29 | — | — | — | 2–21 | — |

Source: LEN
(H) Hosts

=== Qualification round II ===
==== Group A ====
| Pos | Team | Pld | W | D | L | GF | GA | GD | Pts | Qualification | (Italy) BRE | (Romania) ORA | (Spain) CNB | (Georgia (country)) LTB |
|---|---|---|---|---|---|---|---|---|---|---|---|---|---|---|
| 1 | (Italy) AN Brescia | 3 | 3 | 0 | 0 | 46 | 11 | +35 | 9 | Round III | — | — | 12–6 | — |
| 2 | (Romania) Oradea (H) | 3 | 2 | 0 | 1 | 38 | 30 | +8 | 6 | Round III | 4–16 | — | 9–8 | 25–6 |
| 3 | (Spain) CN Barcelona | 3 | 1 | 0 | 2 | 39 | 27 | +12 | 3 | | — | — | — | 25–6 |
| 4 | (Georgia (country)) Locomotive Tbilisi | 3 | 0 | 0 | 3 | 13 | 68 | −55 | 0 | | 1–18 | — | — | — |

Source: LEN
(H) Hosts

==== Group B ====
| Pos | Team | Pld | W | D | L | GF | GA | GD | Pts | Qualification | (Hungary) OSC | (Russia) SIN | (Russia) DYN | (Germany) POT |
|---|---|---|---|---|---|---|---|---|---|---|---|---|---|---|
| 1 | (Hungary) OSC Budapest (H) | 3 | 3 | 0 | 0 | 54 | 17 | +37 | 9 | Round III | — | 14–6 | — | 26–4 |
| 2 | (Russia) Sintez Kazan | 3 | 2 | 0 | 1 | 42 | 33 | +9 | 6 | Round III | — | — | — | — |
| 3 | (Russia) Dynamo Moscow | 3 | 1 | 0 | 2 | 35 | 37 | −2 | 3 | | 7–14 | 11–14 | — | — |
| 4 | (Germany) OSC Potsdam | 3 | 0 | 0 | 3 | 21 | 65 | −44 | 0 | | — | 8–22 | 9–17 | — |

Source: LEN
(H) Hosts

==== Group C ====
| Pos | Team | Pld | W | D | L | GF | GA | GD | Pts | Qualification | (Spain) CNT | (France) STR | (Romania) STE | (Serbia) ŠAB |
|---|---|---|---|---|---|---|---|---|---|---|---|---|---|---|
| 1 | (Spain) CN Terrassa (H) | 3 | 3 | 0 | 0 | 39 | 20 | +19 | 9 | Round III | — | 13–6 | 12–9 | 12–5 |
| 2 | (France) Strasbourg | 3 | 2 | 0 | 1 | 27 | 29 | −2 | 6 | Round III | — | — | 9–7 | — |
| 3 | (Romania) Steaua Bucharest | 3 | 1 | 0 | 2 | 33 | 34 | −1 | 3 | | — | — | — | 17–13 |
| 4 | (Serbia) Šabac | 3 | 0 | 0 | 3 | 27 | 41 | −14 | 0 | | — | 9–12 | — | — |

Source: LEN
(H) Hosts

==== Group D ====
| Pos | Team | Pld | W | D | L | GF | GA | GD | Pts | Qualification | (Croatia) JST | (Greece) NCV | (France) AIX | (Serbia) CZB |
|---|---|---|---|---|---|---|---|---|---|---|---|---|---|---|
| 1 | (Croatia) Jadran Split | 3 | 3 | 0 | 0 | 40 | 27 | +13 | 9 | Round III | — | — | 16–9 | — |
| 2 | (Greece) NC Vouliagmeni | 3 | 2 | 0 | 1 | 30 | 23 | +7 | 6 | Round III | 9–10 | — | — | — |
| 3 | (France) Pays d’Aix Natation | 3 | 1 | 0 | 2 | 32 | 37 | −5 | 3 | | — | 10–13 | — | — |
| 4 | (Serbia) Crvena zvezda (H) | 3 | 0 | 0 | 3 | 20 | 35 | −15 | 0 | | 9–14 | 3–8 | 8–13 | — |

Source: LEN
(H) Hosts

=== Qualification round III ===
| Team 1 | Agg. | Team 2 | 1st leg | 2nd leg |
|---|---|---|---|---|
| Jadran Split (Croatia) | 29–12 | (France) Strasbourg | 13–5 | 16–7 |
| AN Brescia (Italy) | 20–22 | (Russia) Sintez Kazan | 13–12 | 7–10 |
| CN Terrassa (Spain) | 16–12 | (Romania) Oradea | 10–7 | 6–5 |
| OSC Budapest (Hungary) | 18–9 | (Greece) NC Vouliagmeni | 11–3 | 7–6 |

== Preliminary round ==
Location of teams of the 2019–20 LEN Champions League preliminary round.

The draw for the 2019–20 LEN Champions League preliminary round has been conducted in Barcelona. In the regular season, teams will play against each other home-and-away in a round-robin format. The top four teams in group A and the top three teams in group B will advance to the Final 8. Also, Pro Recco will participate in the Final 8 as the host of tournament. The matchdays will be from 8 October 2019 to 20 May 2020. Teams are ranked according to points (3 points for a win, 1 point for a draw, 0 points for a loss), and if tied on points, the following tiebreaking criteria are applied, in the order given, to determine the rankings:

- Points in head-to-head matches among tied teams;
- Goal difference in head-to-head matches among tied teams;
- Goals scored in head-to-head matches among tied teams;
- Goal difference in all group matches;
- Goals scored in all group matches.

Key to colors
| Advance to the Final 8 | Home team win | Tie | Away team win |

=== Group A ===
| Pos | Team | Pld | W | D | L | GF | GA | GD | Pts | (Spain) BAR | (Croatia) JUG | (Greece) OLY | (Montenegro) JHN | (Hungary) SZO | (Germany) S04 | (Croatia) JST | (Russia) SIN |
|---|---|---|---|---|---|---|---|---|---|---|---|---|---|---|---|---|---|
| 1 | (Spain) CNA Barceloneta | 10 | 8 | 1 | 1 | 138 | 100 | +38 | 25 | — | (canc.) | 11–11 | 12–6 | 14–10 | (canc.) | 16–12 | (canc.) |
| 2 | (Croatia) Jug Dubrovnik | 10 | 8 | 0 | 2 | 130 | 97 | +33 | 24 | 15–13 | — | 13–9 | (canc.) | 14–11 | 12–7 | (canc.) | 18–10 |
| 3 | (Greece) Olympiacos | 10 | 7 | 1 | 2 | 102 | 89 | +13 | 22 | 9–15 | 6–5 | — | 8–7 | (canc.) | 13–8 | (canc.) | 10–8 |
| 4 | (Montenegro) Jadran Herceg Novi | 10 | 4 | 1 | 5 | 106 | 105 | +1 | 13 | 12–13 | 7–12 | (canc.) | — | 12–14 | (canc.) | 14–11 | 12–9 |
| 5 | (Hungary) Szolnok | 10 | 4 | 0 | 6 | 102 | 109 | −7 | 12 | (canc.) | 12–16 | 7–8 | (canc.) | — | 7–8 | 5–4 | 13–10 |
| 6 | (Germany) Spandau 04 | 10 | 3 | 2 | 5 | 96 | 108 | −12 | 11 | 8–11 | (canc.) | 7–11 | 9–9 | 10–14 | — | (canc.) | 15–8 |
| 7 | (Croatia) Jadran Split | 10 | 2 | 1 | 7 | 94 | 125 | −31 | 7 | 5–13 | 12–11 | 8–17 | 6–12 | 13–9 | 12–12 | — | (canc.) |
| 8 | (Russia) Sintez Kazan | 10 | 1 | 0 | 9 | 105 | 140 | −35 | 3 | 12–20 | 10–14 | (canc.) | 11–15 | (canc.) | 11–12 | 16–11 | — |

Updated to match(es) played on 4 March 2020. Source: LEN

=== Group B ===
| Pos | Team | Pld | W | D | L | GF | GA | GD | Pts | (Hungary) OSC | (Italy) REC | (Hungary) FTC | (Croatia) MLA | (Spain) CNT | (France) CNM | (Germany) HAN | (Georgia (country)) DTB |
|---|---|---|---|---|---|---|---|---|---|---|---|---|---|---|---|---|---|
| 1 | (Hungary) OSC Budapest | 10 | 7 | 1 | 2 | 135 | 96 | +39 | 22 | — | 10–14 | 10–10 | 13–10 | 21–4 | 10–13 | 19–10 | (canc.) |
| 2 | (Italy) Pro Recco | 9 | 6 | 2 | 1 | 133 | 85 | +48 | 20 | 9–12 | — | 13–13 | (canc.) | 15–5 | (canc.) | (canc.) | 24–9 |
| 3 | (Hungary) Ferencváros | 9 | 6 | 2 | 1 | 114 | 85 | +29 | 20 | 8–11 | 3 Mar (Note: Match postponed because of the coronavirus outbreak in various European countries. The new dates shall be decided after consulting with the clubs.) | — | 14–5 | 17–11 | 13–7 | 15–12 | (canc.) |
| 4 | (Croatia) Mladost Zagreb | 10 | 6 | 1 | 3 | 126 | 116 | +10 | 19 | (canc.) | 11–11 | 6–9 | — | (canc.) | 12–11 | 15–13 | 21–11 |
| 5 | (Spain) CN Terrassa | 10 | 4 | 1 | 5 | 91 | 125 | −34 | 13 | 10–15 | (canc.) | (canc.) | 11–14 | — | 11–11 | 11–10 | 9–5 |
| 6 | (France) CN Marseille | 10 | 3 | 1 | 6 | 108 | 112 | −4 | 10 | (canc.) | 9–13 | (canc.) | 11–14 | 9–10 | — | 8–7 | 17–7 |
| 7 | (Germany) Waspo 98 Hannover | 10 | 2 | 0 | 8 | 114 | 140 | −26 | 6 | (canc.) | 13–21 | (canc.) | 12–18 | 8–9 | (canc.) | — | 18–14 |
| 8 | (Georgia (country)) Dinamo Tbilisi | 10 | 1 | 0 | 9 | 92 | 154 | −62 | 3 | 8–14 | 3–13 | 10–15 | (canc.) | (canc.) | 15–12 | 10–11 | — |

Updated to match(es) played on 3 March 2020. Source: LEN

== Final 8 ==
5–7 June 2020, Recco, Italy.

Location of the 2019–20 LEN Champions League Final 8

=== Qualified teams ===
| Group | Winners | Runners-up | Third | Fourth |
|---|---|---|---|---|
| A | | | | |
| B | | | | |

=== Bracket ===
Quarterfinals
5 June
5 June
5 June
5 June

Semifinals
6 June
6 June

Final
7 June
Third place game
7 June

5th–8th place bracket

5th–8th place semifinals
6 June
6 June

Fifth place game
7 June
Seventh place game
7 June

=== Quarterfinals ===
| 5 June 2020 | Cancelled | – | Recco |

| 5 June 2020 | Cancelled | – | Recco |

| 5 June 2020 | Cancelled | – | Recco |

| 5 June 2020 | Cancelled | – | Recco |

=== 5th–8th place semifinals ===
| 6 June 2020 | Cancelled | – | Recco |

| 6 June 2020 | Cancelled | – | Recco |

=== Semifinals ===
| 6 June 2020 | Cancelled | – | Recco |

| 6 June 2020 | Cancelled | – | Recco |

=== Seventh place game ===
| 7 June 2020 | Cancelled | – | Recco |

=== Fifth place game ===
| 7 June 2020 | Cancelled | – | Recco |

=== Third place game ===
| 7 June 2020 | Cancelled | – | Recco |

=== Final ===
| 7 June 2020 | Cancelled | – | Recco |

=== Final ranking ===
| | Team |
|---|---|
| Silver medal | |
| Bronze medal | |
| 4 | |
| 5 | |
| 6 | |
| 7 | |
| 8 | |

== See also ==
- 2019–20 LEN Euro Cup
- 2019 LEN Super Cup
