= Ivan Malenica (water polo) =

Croatian water polo player

Personal information
- Nationality: Croatian
- Born: 6 July 1999 (age 26) Šibenik, Croatia
- Height: 1.92 m (6 ft 4 in)
- Weight: 80 kg (176 lb)

Sport
- Country: Croatia
- Sport: Water polo
- Club: VK Solaris

Ivan Malenica (born 6 July 1999) is a Croatian water polo player. He is currently playing for VK Solaris. He is 6 ft 4 in (1.92 m) tall and weighs 176 lb (80 kg).
