= Andrija Komadina =

Croatian water polo player

Personal information
- Nationality: Croatia
- Born: 23 November 1977 (age 48) Šibenik, SR Croatia, SFR Yugoslavia
- Height: 1.96 m (6 ft 5 in)
- Weight: 110 kg (240 lb)

Sport
- Sport: Water polo
- Position: Defender

Senior clubs
- Years: Team
- –: VK Šibenik
- –: Mladost Zagreb
- –: Jug Dubrovnik
- 2015–2019: Olympiacos
- –: VK Solaris
National team
- Years: Team
- –: Croatia

Andrija Komadina (born 23 November 1977) is a Croatian former professional water polo player. He was a member of the Croatia men's national water polo team, played as a defender. He was a part of the Croatian team that won the fourth place at the 2005 World Championship and the fourth plaće at the 2006 World Cup. On club level, he played most notably for VK Šibenik, HAVK Mladost, VK Jug Dubrovnik and VK Solaris in Croatia, as well as for Olympiacos in Greece. As a member of Jug Dubrovnik, he won the 2005–06 LEN Euroleague and as a member of Olympiacos from 2006 to 2011 he won 5 Greek Championships (2007–2011), 5 Greek Cups (2007–2011) and the fourth place in the Final Four of the 2006–07 LEN Euroleague. He is currently the president of VK Vodice. He is 6 ft 5 in (1.96 m) tall and weighs 240 lb (110 kg).
