= Mathieu Peisson =

French water polo player (born 1982)

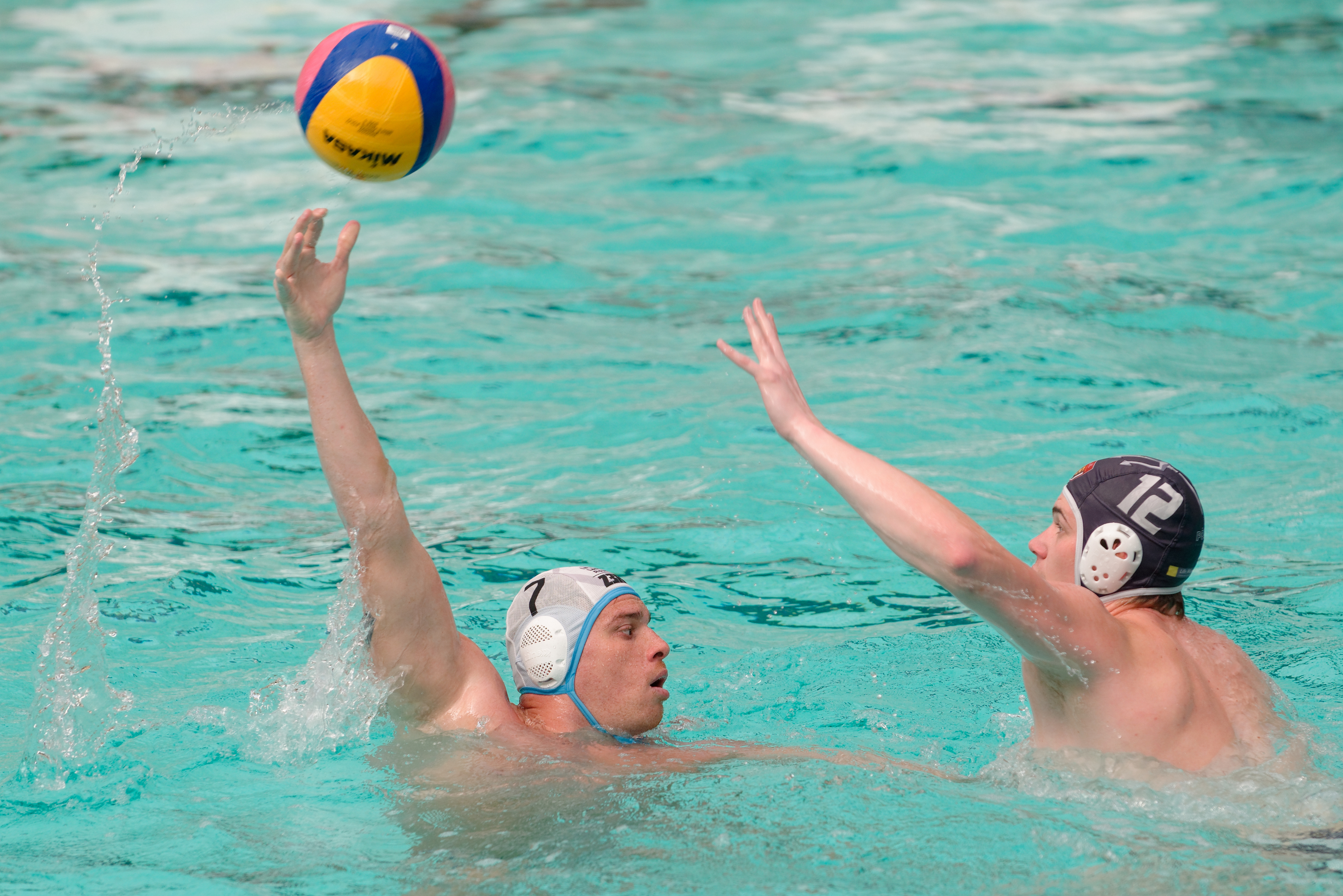
- Peisson (left) in 2014

Personal information
- Full name: Mathieu René Peisson
- Born: 29 September 1982 (age 44) Sète, Hérault, France
- Height: 185 cm (6 ft 1 in)
- Weight: 105 kg (231 lb)

Sport
- Country: France
- Sport: Water polo
- Club: Cercle des Nageurs Noiséens

Mathieu René Peisson (born 29 September 1982) is a water polo player from France. He was part of the French team at the 2016 Summer Olympics, where the team was eliminated in the group stage.
