= Ivan Jukić (water polo) =

Croatian water polo player

Personal information
- Nationality: Croatian
- Born: 26 December 1991 (age 34) Šibenik, Croatia
- Height: 1.89 m (6 ft 2 in)
- Weight: 82 kg (181 lb)

Sport
- Country: Croatia
- Sport: Water polo
- Club: VK Solaris

Ivan Jukić (born 26 December 1991) is a Croatian water polo player. He is currently playing for VK Solaris. He is 6 ft 2 in (1.89 m) tall and weighs 181 lb (82 kg).
