= Massimo Giacoppo =

Italian water polo player

Personal information
- Nationality: Italian
- Born: 10 May 1983 (age 43) Messina, Italy
- Height: 1.84 m (6 ft 1/2 in)
- Weight: 92 kg (203 lb)

Sport
- Country: Italy
- Sport: Water Polo
- Club: Pro Recco
Medal record
Men's Water polo
Olympic Games
Silver medal – second place	2012 London	Team
European Championships
Silver medal – second place	2010 Zagreb	Team
Bronze medal – third place	2014 Budapest	Team
World League
Silver medal – second place	2011 Florence	Team

Massimo Giacoppo (born 10 May 1983) is an Italian water polo player, part of the Italian team that won the silver medal at the 2012 Summer Olympics.

== Achievements ==
Year	Competition	Venue	Position	Event	Notes
2010	European Water Polo Championship	(Croatia) Zagreb	1st	Team competition	

== See also ==
- List of Olympic medalists in water polo (men)
