= Valletta United W.P.C. =

Water polo club from Valletta, Malta

Coordinates: 35°54′03″N 14°30′38″E

Valletta United W.P.C
- Founded: 1903
- League: Maltese Waterpolo Premier League
- Based in: Valletta
- Arena: Marsamxett, Valletta
- Colors: Blue and Yellow
- President: Victor Spiteri
- Head coach: Joseph Cremona
- Championships: 11 - 1926, 1950, 1951, 1955, 1956, 1970, 1971, 1973, 1980, 1985, 1990

Valletta United Water Polo Club is a Water Polo club from Valletta, Malta, and was founded in 1903. The club competes in the Maltese Waterpolo Premier League.

For sponsorship reasons, the club was known as Valletta Videoslots between 2018 and 2020.

The club is currently known as Valletta IZIBET, for sponsorship reasons.

The Club has won 11 Water Polo Premier Divisions (1926, 1950, 1951, 1955, 1956, 1970, 1971, 1973, 1980, 1985, 1990) and 7 Premier KOs, in addition to 2 First Division (2013, 2020) and 2 First Division KOs (2013, 2020).

== Premises ==
The club's premises, on Valletta's Marsamxett side, were left in ruins for a long period of time, with letters appearing in newspapers from 2010. Things seemed to have remained the same till 8 years later, when Nationalist Party Member of Parliament Claudio Grech created awareness about the state of the club's premises. Around a month later, the club was given title of the land from the Government of Malta and announced a €2.5 million investment to revamp the club's premises and facilities.

== Current squad ==
As at October 2024:

- (Malta) Benjamin Busuttil
- (Malta) Andrew Bugeja
- (Malta) Max Zammit
- (Malta) Sebastian Busuttil
- (Malta) Matthew Chircop
- (Malta) Matthew Mifsud
- (Malta) Kieyan Borg
- (Malta) Kyle Cremona
- (Malta) Ken Erdogan
- (Malta) Mark Amir Carani
- (Malta) Jacob Sciberras
- (Russia) Ivan Nagaev
- (Malta) Zak Cutajar Licari

Head coach: Joseph Cremona
