= Mateo Sabioni =

Croatian water polo player

Personal information
- Nationality: Croatian
- Born: 2 July 2001 (age 24) Šibenik, Croatia
- Height: 1.90 m (6 ft 3 in)
- Weight: 87 kg (192 lb)

Sport
- Country: Croatia
- Sport: Water polo
- Club: VK Solaris

Mateo Sabioni (born 2 July 2001) is a Croatian water polo player. He is currently playing for VK Solaris. He is 6 ft 3 in (1.90 m) tall and weighs 192 lb (87 kg).
