= Eugen Koprčina =

Croatian water polo player

Personal information
- Nationality: Croatian
- Born: 10 September 1996 (age 29) Biograd na Moru, Croatia
- Height: 1.87 m (6 ft 2 in)
- Weight: 83 kg (183 lb)

Sport
- Country: Croatia
- Sport: Water polo
- Club: VK Solaris

Eugen Koprčina (born 10 September 1996) is a Croatian water polo player. He is currently playing for VK Solaris. He is 6 ft 2 in (1.88 m) tall and weighs 183 lb (83 kg).
