= Domagoj Bulat =

Croatian water polo player

Personal information
- Nationality: Croatian
- Born: 17 January 1996 (age 30) Šibenik, Croatia
- Height: 1.88 m (6 ft 2 in)
- Weight: 98 kg (216 lb)

Sport
- Country: Croatia
- Sport: Water polo
- Club: VK Solaris

Domagoj Bulat (born 17 January 1996) is a Croatian water polo player. He is currently playing for VK Solaris. He is 6 ft 2 in (1.88 m) tall and weighs 216 lb (98 kg).
