= Karlo Kreković =

Croatian water polo player

Personal information
- Nationality: Croatian
- Born: 27 January 1999 (age 27) Split, Croatia
- Height: 1.94 m (6 ft 4 in)
- Weight: 96 kg (212 lb)

Sport
- Country: Croatia
- Sport: Water polo
- Club: Montpellier

Karlo Kreković (born 27 January 1999) is a Croatian water polo player. He is currently playing for Montpellier. He is 6 ft 4 in (1.94 m) tall and weighs 212 lb (96 kg). His father Joško Kreković is a head coach of his son's water polo team.
