= Andrija Vlahović =

Croatian water polo player

Personal information
- Nationality: Croatian
- Born: 23 September 1991 (age 33); Šibenik, Croatia
- Height: 1.94 m (6 ft 4 in)
- Weight: 98 kg (216 lb)

Sport
- Country: Croatia
- Sport: Water polo
- Club: VK Solaris

Andrija Vlahović (born 23 September 1991) is a Croatian water polo player. He is currently playing for VK Solaris. He is 6 ft 4 in (1.94 m) tall and weighs 216 lb (98 kg).
