= Vice Erak =

Croatian water polo player (born 2001)

Personal information
- Nationality: Croatian
- Born: 12 January 2001 (age 25) Šibenik, Croatia
- Height: 1.96 m (6 ft 5 in)
- Weight: 94 kg (207 lb)

Sport
- Country: Croatia
- Sport: Water polo
- Club: VK Solaris

Vice Erak (born 12 January 2001) is a Croatian professional water polo player. He is currently playing for VK Solaris. He is 6 ft 5 in (1.96 m) tall and weighs 207 lb (94 kg). His brother, Karlo Erak, is also water polo player.
