= Nikola Štrkalj =

Croatian water polo player

Personal information
- Nationality: Croatian
- Born: 4 February 1998 (age 28) Šibenik, Croatia
- Height: 2.03 m (6 ft 8 in)
- Weight: 105 kg (231 lb)

Sport
- Country: Croatia
- Sport: Water polo
- Club: VK Solaris

Nikola Štrkalj (born 4 February 1998) is a Croatian water polo player. He is currently playing for VK Solaris. He is 6 ft 8 in (2.03 m) tall and weighs 231 lb (105 kg).
