= Joško Kreković =

Croatian water polo player

Personal information
- Born: 17 April 1969 (age 57) Split, SR Croatia, SFR Yugoslavia

Sport
- Sport: Water polo

Senior clubs
- Years: Team
- –: Jadran Split

Teams coached
- 2018–2020: VK Solaris
Medal record
Men's water polo
Representing Croatia
Olympic Games
Silver medal – second place	1996 Atlanta	Team

Joško Kreković (born 17 April 1969) is a Croatian former water polo player and current coach, who was a member of the Croatia national team that won the silver medal at the 1996 Summer Olympics in Atlanta. He currently serves as a head coach of the junior Croatia national team.

His son Karlo Kreković is also a professional water polo player.

== See also ==
- List of Olympic medalists in water polo (men)
