= Pieve Ligure =

Pieve Ligure A Ceive
- Comune
- Comune di Pieve Ligure
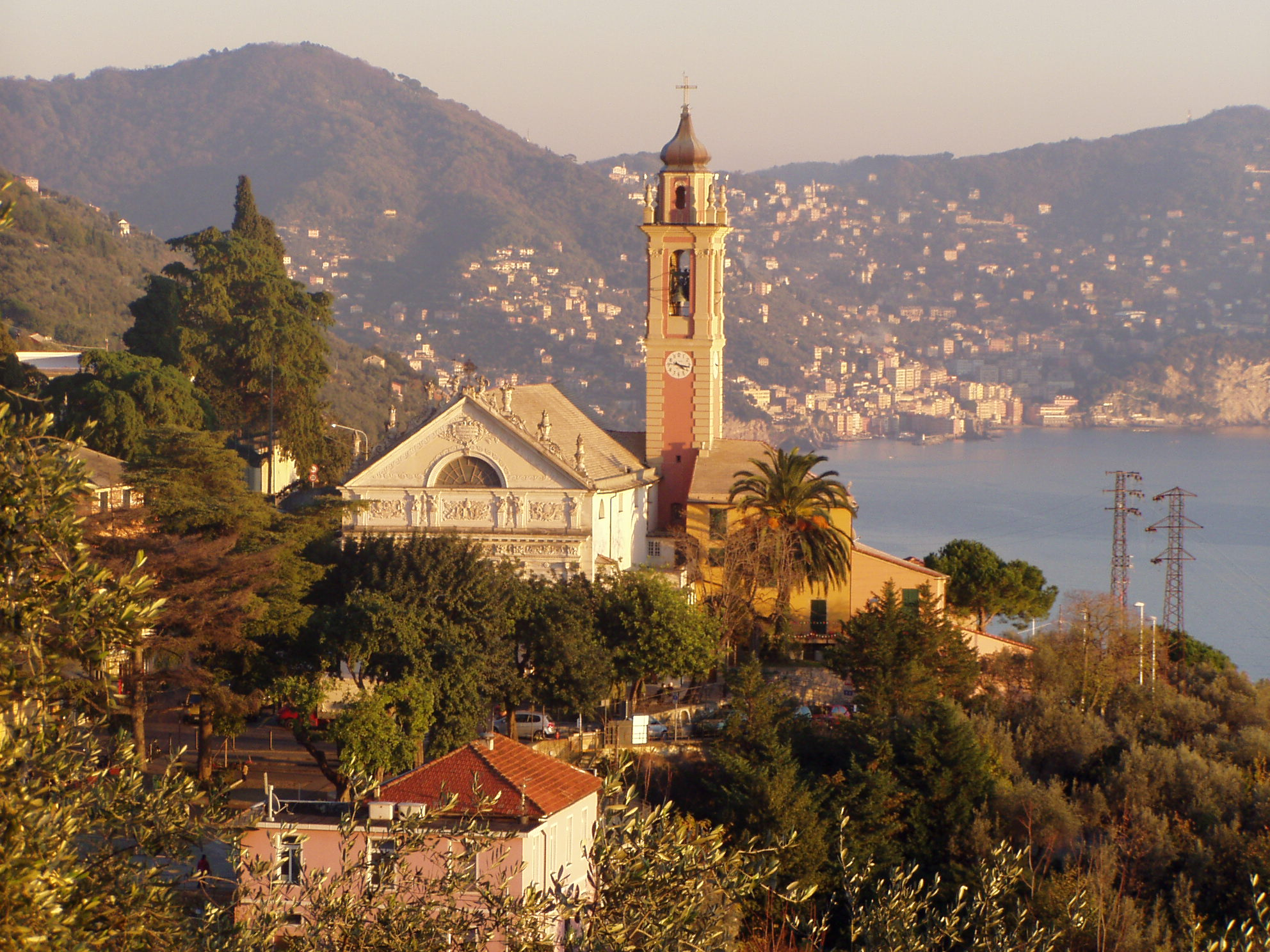

- Coat of arms

- Location within Italy Location within Liguria
- Coordinates: 44°22′N 9°5′E
- Country: Italy
- Region: Liguria
- Metropolitan city: Genoa (GE)
- Frazioni: Corsanego

Government
  - Mayor: Paola Negro

Area
  - Total: 3.56 km^{2} (1.37 sq mi)
- Elevation: 168 m (551 ft)

Population (31 May 2022)
  - Total: 2,404
  - Density: 675/km^{2} (1,750/sq mi)
- Demonym: Pievesi
- Time zone: UTC+1 (CET)
  - Summer (DST): UTC+2 (CEST)
- Postal code: 16030
- Dialing code: 010
- Website: Official website

Pieve Ligure (Ligurian: A Ceive, locally A Céie) is a comune (municipality) in the Metropolitan City of Genoa in the Italian region Liguria, located about 13 kilometres (8 mi) southeast of Genoa.

The pieve of St. Michael Archangel, from which the town takes its name, has been rebuilt in Baroque style in the 18th century and houses works by Perin del Vaga e Luigi Morgari. The other main church is the Oratory of St. Anthony Abbot (early 15th century). The Castello Cirla originated as a medieval Saracen tower, although it was turned into a private residence in 1909.
