= Recco =

- Comune
- Città di Recco
- Aerial view, 2026

- Flag Coat of arms

- Location within Italy Location within Liguria
- Coordinates: 44°22′N 9°9′E
- Country: Italy
- Region: Liguria
- Metropolitan city: Genoa (GE)
- Frazioni: Megli, Polanesi, San Rocco, Mulinetti

Government
  - Mayor: Carlo Gandolfo (Fratelli d'Italia)

Area
  - Total: 9.77 km^{2} (3.77 sq mi)
- Elevation: 5 m (16 ft)

Population (31 May 2022)
  - Total: 9,442
  - Density: 966/km^{2} (2,500/sq mi)
- Demonym: Recchesi or Recchelini
- Time zone: UTC+1 (CET)
  - Summer (DST): UTC+2 (CEST)
- Postal code: 16036
- Dialing code: 0185
- Patron saint: San Giovanni Bono
- Saint day: 10 January and 8 September
- Website: Official website

Recco (Latin: Ricina / Recina) is a comune in the Metropolitan City of Genoa, region of Liguria, Italy.

Recco is home to the September 8 fireworks festival honoring the Virgin Mary. The town is also known for being home to the most successful waterpolo team in Italy, and among the best in Europe, Pro Recco.

== History ==
Historically, Recco was populated by the Casmoriti, part of the Ligurian family. Later, it was conquered by the Romans who founded this ancient town, and gave the town the name of Recina or Ricina. At one point in time, it served as a Roman castrum (camp) on the Via Aurelia.

In 1943, during World War II, Recco was heavily bombed by the Allies, destroying the railway and severely damaging the town and about 80% of the town's infrastructure. "The town of Recco in Genoa province, a target because of its viaduct, had lost 90 percent of its buildings and 127 inhabitants" It was rebuilt in the late forties and early 1950s.

== Sport ==
The city is home to the water polo team Pro Recco, winner of winner of 37 championships (the first in 1959, the last in 2025) in the Italian Serie A1, 18 Italian Cups, 11 LEN Champions League Cups and 9 LEN Super Cups. It is also the only Italian team for five times to have won the grand slam (Championship, Italian Cup, Champions Cup, European Super Cup).

== Cuisine ==
Recco is known for its focaccia con il formaggio (focaccia with cheese) which is made with stracchino. The consortium that dictates the official recipe of the focaccia, supposedly the result of a Saracen attack in the 13th century, has obtained the European Union PGI status for the recipe.

== Twin towns ==
- Ponte di Legno, Italy
