= VK Solaris =

Croatian water polo club

- Full name: Vaterpolski klub Solaris
- Nickname: Sunčani (The Sunny Ones)
- Founded: 2015; 11 years ago
- League: Croatian League
- Team history: VK Solaris (2015–present)
- Based in: Šibenik, Croatia
- Arena: Bazen Crnica (Capacity: 400)
- Colours: Blue and Orange
- President: Tomislav Jukić
- Head coach: Antonio Petković

Vaterpolski klub Solaris (English: Solaris Water Polo Club), commonly referred to as VK Solaris or simply Solaris, is a men's professional water polo club based in Šibenik, Croatia. As of 2026–27 season, it competes in the Croatian First League.

== History ==
The club was founded in the summer 2015 by merging former clubs VK Šibenik and VK Adriatic for the need to become a strong water polo club in Šibenik. After some problems, the merge finally came in August 2015, and the newly formed VK Solaris takes over Adriatic's place and organization, and relies on the Šibenik's tradition.

In May 2019, the club came fifth in the Croatian First League championship, defeating POŠK by a scoreline of 20–14 on aggregate (14–5, 6–9). Winning the fifth place, Solaris secured its place in the following season of LEN Europa Cup.

== Players ==
=== Current squad ===
Season 2020/21

№	Nat.	Player	Pos.
1	(Croatia)	Marin Šparada	GK, C
2	(Croatia)	Ivan Malenica
3	(Croatia)	Vice Erak
4	(Croatia)	Nikola Štrkalj
5	(Croatia)	Domagoj Bulat
6	(Croatia)	Branimir Herceg
8	(Croatia)	Roko Pelicarić
9	(Croatia)	Nino Mudražija
11	(Croatia)	Eugen Koprčina
13	(Croatia)	Ivan Jukić
—	(Croatia)	Toni Šparada
—	(Croatia)	Mateo Sabioni
—	(Croatia)	Roko Golubović
—	(Croatia)	Lucian Štrkalj
—	(Croatia)	Paško Brajković
—	(Croatia)	Ante Ljubičić
—	(Croatia)	Ivan Ibrahimpašić

== Personnel ==
Staff	Job title
(Croatia) Slaven Bogut	President
(Croatia) Tomislav Ninić	Executive vice president
(Croatia) Tomislav Perak	Vice president
(Croatia) Tomislav Jukić	Vice president
(Croatia) Katarina Šupe	Secretary
(Croatia) Jakša Knežević	Director
(Croatia) Jure Marelja	Head coach
(Croatia) Edi Brkić	Assistant coach
(Croatia) Denis Šupe	Coordinator for children

== Honours ==
=== Domestic ===
- Croatian First League fifth place: 2018–19
- Croatian First League fourth place: 2019–20

=== Regional ===
- Regional League A2 runner-up: 2018–19, 2019–20 (Promotion to Regional League)

== Notable players ==
- (Croatia) Andrija Komadina
- (Croatia) Andrija Vlahović

== Notable coaches ==
- (Croatia) Joško Kreković
- (Croatia) Renato Vrbičić
